= List of Inverness Caledonian Thistle F.C. records and statistics =

Inverness Caledonian Thistle are a Scottish professional association football club based in Inverness. They have played at their home ground, the Caledonian Stadium, since 1996, prior to that they played at Telford Street Park, as well as a brief spell at Pittodrie in Aberdeen whilst the Caledonian Stadium was being refurbished following their promotion to the Scottish Premier League in 2004. Inverness CT joined the Scottish Football League in 1994, and the Scottish Premier League in 2004 as well being a founding member of the Scottish Premiership in 2013.

The club's record appearance maker is Ross Tokely, who made 545 appearances between 1996 and 2012. Billy Mckay is the club's record goalscorer, scoring 120 goals in major competitions during his 3 spells with Inverness CT, passing previous record holder, Dennis Wyness' 100 goal milestone, in a 3–2 loss to Airdrieonians in July 2023.

These lists encompass the major honours won by Inverness CT, records set by the club, their managers and their players. The player records section includes details of the club's leading goalscorers and those who have made most appearances in first-team competitions. It also records notable achievements by Inverness CT players both domestically and on the international stage, and the highest transfer fees paid and received by the club. Attendance records at the Caledonian Stadium are also included in the list, as well as record wins and defeats.

== Honours ==
Inverness' first domestic final came in the 1999 Scottish Challenge Cup final, in a hard-fought 4–4 draw with Alloa Athletic, before losing 5–4 on penalties. In 2003, Inverness won their first piece of national silverware, beating a newly formed Airdrie United 2–0 in the 2003 Challenge Cup final, before going on to finish as runners up to Dundee in the 2009 final. In 2014, Inverness made their first appearance in a major national final, the 2014 League Cup final, after beating Hearts in dramatic fashion in the Semi-Final, they saw Aberdeen to a 0–0 draw after extra time, before losing 4–2 on penalties. Another final wasn't far away, though, as Inverness reached their first Scottish Cup final the following year, beating Falkirk 2–1, with a late goal from James Vincent securing the win, and Inverness' first major trophy. After the club was relegated to the Championship in 2017, the club immediately bounced back to claim the 2018 Challenge Cup with a 1–0 win over Dumbarton, as well as sharing the 2020 edition of the trophy with Raith Rovers, due to the COVID-19 pandemic cancelling the final.

In 2023, despite the club being in dire straits in the Championship, Inverness reached their second Scottish Cup final, losing 3–1 to Celtic.

=== National ===
==== League ====
- Scottish First Division/Scottish Championship (Second Tier)
  - Winners (2): 2003–04, 2009–10
    - Runners-up (1): 2019–20
- Scottish Second Division/League One (Third Tier)
  - Winners (1): 2025–26
    - Runners-up (1): 1998–99
- Scottish Third Division (Fourth Tier)
  - Winners (1): 1996–97

==== Scottish Cup ====
- Winners (1): 2014–15
  - Runners-up (1): 2022–23

==== Scottish League Cup ====
- Runners-up (1): 2013–14

==== Scottish Challenge Cup ====
- Winners (3): 2003–04, 2017–18, 2019–20
  - Runners-up (3): 1999–00, 2009–10, 2025–26

=== Regional (Reserves) ===
- North Caledonian Football League (2): 1994–95, 1997–98
- North of Scotland Cup (4): 1999–00, 2007–08, 2009–10, 2011–12
- Inverness Cup (8): 1995–96, 1997–98, 1998–99, 1999–00, 2001–02, 2004–05, 2009–10, 2023–24
- Football Times Cup (1): 1998–99

=== Other cups ===
- Chic Allan Memorial Cup (2): 1994–95, 1998–99
- PCT Cup (1): 1998–99

== Player records ==
=== Appearances ===
Ross Tokely is the club's all-time record appearance holder with 545 appearances in all competitions, including playoffs and Challenge Cups.

- Most appearances in all competitions: Ross Tokely, 545.
- Most League appearances: Ross Tokely, 456.
- Most Scottish Cup appearances: Ross Tokely, 42.
- Most League Cup appearances: Ross Tokely, 32
- Most European appearances: 12 Players, 2
- Youngest first-team player: Jamie Carnihan, 16 years, 78 days (against Raith Rovers on 30 November 2021)
- Oldest first-team player: Jim Calder, 41 years, 16 days (against Alloa Athletic on 14 August 2001)

=== Top 50 most appearances ===
Competitive, professional matches only, up to the end of the 2025/26 season.

#	Name	Years	League	Scottish Cup	League Cup	Europe	Total
1	(Scotland) Ross Tokely	1996–2012	456	42	32	-	530
2	Aaron Doran	2011–2024	303	35	31	2	371
3	(Scotland) Grant Munro	1998–2011	312	25	19	-	356
4	Billy Mckay	2011–2015 2017 2021–2026	300	25	26	-	351
5	Russell Duncan	2001–2011	289	29	21	-	339
6	Roy McBain	2000–2011	285	26	20	-	331
7	Barry Wilson	1996–2000 2003–2008	253	18	20	-	291
8	Danny Devine	2013–2016 2020–	237	22	22	2	283
9	Mark Ridgers	2017–2024	214	22	23	-	259
10	(Canada) Richard Hastings	1994–2001 2004–2009	221	17	15	-	253
11	Stuart Golabek	1999–2007 2009–2011	211	17	18	-	246
12	Dennis Wyness	1999–2003 2005–2008	199	20	16	-	235
13	Gary Warren	2012–2018	181	20	14	2	217
14	Ross Draper	2012–2017	170	17	18	2	207
15	Richie Foran	2009–2016	174	18	10	2	204
16=	Bobby Mann	1999–2004	171	18	12	-	201
16=	Liam Polworth	2011–2019	166	17	18	-	201
17	Carl Tremarco	2013–2020	165	15	18	-	198
18	Mark Brown	2002–2007	170	16	11	-	197
19	(Scotland) Jim Calder	1994–2002	167	19	4	-	194
20	Josh Meekings	2011–2017	163	16	11	2	192
21	Greg Tansey	2011–2012 2014–2017	162	17	10	2	191
22	Stuart McCaffrey	2000–2008	162	17	11	-	190
23	Charlie Christie	1994–2004	158	17	13	-	188
24	Graeme Shinnie	2009–2015 2026–	156	18	12	-	186
25	David Raven	2012–2018	153	15	15	2	185
26	Ryan Esson	2008–2017	163	10	8	-	181
27	Nick Ross	2010–2015	149	13	9	-	171
28	Barry Robson	1997–2003	135	14	11	-	160
29=	David Proctor	2003–2006 2007–2012	139	12	8	-	159
29=	Richie Hart	2002–2008	142	8	9	-	159
30	Brad McKay	2016–2021	124	16	14	-	154
31	(England) David Carson	2019–2024	124	14	15	-	153
32	Shane Sutherland	2010–2013 2020–2023	131	9	12	-	152
33=	Ian Black	2004–2009	132	7	5	-	144
33=	(Scotland) Cameron Harper	2018–2024	116	11	17	-	144
34	Iain Vigurs	2006–2009 2015–2018	113	10	13	-	136
35	Graham Bayne	2004–2008	119	7	7	-	133
36=	(Scotland) Iain Stewart	1995–2000	115	11	6	-	132
36=	Sean Welsh	2018–2024	109	17	6	-	132
37	Paul Sheerin	1998–2001	115	9	6	-	130
38	Mike Teasdale	1995–2002	107	9	10	-	126
39	(Scotland) Joe Chalmers	2017–2019 2025–	98	11	12	-	121
40	Paul Ritchie	2001–2004	99	13	8	-	120
41	Adam Rooney	2008–2011	103	8	6	-	117
42	Mark McCulloch	1997–2000	100	9	5	-	114
43	Darren Dods	2004–2007	100	9	3	-	112
44	Martin Bavidge	1998–2002	96	7	8	-	111
45=	Mike Noble	1994–1997	95	9	5	-	109
45=	Danny Williams	2013–2016	89	14	4	2	109
46	(Scotland) Roddy MacGregor	2018–2024 2026–	77	11	18	-	106
47=	(Scotland) Robbie Deas	2020–2023	84	7	2	-	103
47=	(Scotland) Dean Brill	2013–2016	86	10	7	-	103
47=	(Scotland) Wallace Duffy	2020–2024	83	8	12	-	103
48	James Vincent	2013–2016 2019–2021	82	9	11	-	102
49	Liam Keogh	2002–2007	86	8	6	-	100
50	(England) Luis Longstaff	2023–	83	5	10	-	98

=== Top 10 non-UK appearances ===
Competitive, professional matches only, up to the end of the 2025/26 season.

# (non UK)	# (Exc ROI)	Name	Years	League	Scottish Cup	League Cup	Europe	Total
1	x	Aaron Doran	2011–2024	303	35	31	2	371
2	1	Richard Hastings	1994–2001; 2004–2009	221	17	15	0	253
3	x	Richie Foran	2009–2016	174	18	10	2	204
4	x	(Republic of Ireland) Adam Rooney	2008–2011	103	8	6	0	117
5	x	Jonny Hayes	2009–2012	85	6	5	0	96
6	2	Charlie Trafford	2017–2020	70	10	6	0	86
7	x	Jake Mulraney	2016–2018	52	2	8	0	62
8	3	Nikolay Todorov	2019–2021	48	4	8	0	60
9	x	(Republic of Ireland) Zak Delaney	2022–2024	37	5	8	0	50
10	4	Dani Sánchez	2009–2011	41	4	1	0	48
11	5	Davide Xausa	1999–2001	41	4	2	0	47
12	6	(France) Kenny Gillet	2010–2012	38	2	1	0	41
13	7	(France) Grégory Tadé	2011–2012	36	3	1	0	40
14=	8=	(Latvia) Nauris Bulvītis	2009–2010	32	2	3	0	37
14=	8=	(Romania) Marius Niculae	2007–2008	35	1	1	0	37
15=	9=	(France) Lionel Djebi-Zadi	2008–2010	27	4	4	0	35
15=	9=	(Spain) Juanjo	2004–2005	31	2	2	0	35
16	10	(Zambia) Chanka Zimba	2025–2026	32	2	0	0	34

=== Goalscorers ===
Dennis Wyness was Inverness's all-time leading goalscorer with 101 goals across two spells in all competitions including playoffs and Challenge Cups. Billy Mckay became the second player to surpass the 100 goal mark in all competitions, with a brace in a 3–0 win over Falkirk in the 2023 Scottish Cup Semi Final, equalling Wyness's record in a 2–1 away defeat to Dumbarton in the League Cup, before taking the record a week later in a 3–2 home loss to Airdrieonians. On 2 August 2025, in a 3–0 away win at Kelty Hearts, Billy Mckay became the first player in the clubs history to hit the 100 league goal milestone.

- Most goals scored: Billy Mckay, 125.
- Most goals scored in League: Billy Mckay, 105.
- Most goals scored in Scottish Cup: Billy Mckay, 13.
- Most goals scored in Scottish League Cup: Dennis Wyness, 8.
- Most goals scored in Europe: N/A.
- Most goals scored in a season: Iain Stewart, 29, 1996–97.
- Most league goals in a season: Iain Stewart, 27, 1996–97.

=== Top 50 goalscorers ===
Competitive, professional matches only, as of match played 20 November 2026.

#	Name	Years	League	Scottish Cup	League Cup	Europe	Total
1	(Northern Ireland) Billy Mckay	2011–2015 2017, 2021–2026	105	13	7	-	125
2	(Scotland) Dennis Wyness	1999–2003 2005–2008	81	11	8	-	100
3	(Scotland) Iain Stewart	1995–2000	70	6	1	-	77
4	(Scotland) Barry Wilson	1996–2000 2003–2008	60	3	5	-	68
5	(Scotland) Paul Richie	2001–2004	46	7	5	-	58
6	(Republic of Ireland) Aaron Doran	2011–2024	38	11	6	-	55
7	(Republic of Ireland) Adam Rooney	2008–2011	44	5	4	-	53
8	(Republic of Ireland) Richie Foran	2009–2016	39	4	0	-	43
9	(Scotland) Paul Sheerin	1998–2001	36	3	2	-	41
10	(Scotland) Ross Tokely	1996–2012	30	1	3	-	34
11=	(Scotland) Charlie Christie	1994–2004	32	0	1	-	33
11=	(Scotland) Brian Thomson	1996–1998	25	4	4		33
12=	(Scotland) Craig Dargo	2005–2007	26	4	1	-	31
12=	(England) Greg Tansey	2011–2012 2014–2017	25	4	2	-	31
13	(Scotland) Barry Robson	1997–2003	17	7	2	-	26
14	(Republic of Ireland) Jonny Hayes	2009–2012	23	2	0	-	25
15=	(Scotland) Scott McLean	1996–1999	21	0	3	-	24
15=	(Scotland) Andrew Shinnie	2011–2013	19	1	4	-	24
15=	(Scotland) Alfie Bavidge	2025 2025–2026 2026–	22	0	2	-	24
15=	(Scotland) Iain Vigurs	2007–2009 2015–2018	16	3	5	-	24
16=	(Scotland) Alan Hercher	1994–1997	20	2	1	-	23
16=	(Scotland) Jordan White	2018–2020	14	7	2	-	23
17=	(Scotland) Shane Sutherland	2010–2013 2020–2023	16	1	3	-	20
17=	(Canada) Davide Xausa	1999–2001	17	2	1	-	20
18=	(Scotland) Graham Bayne	2004–2008	15	1	3	-	19
18=	(Scotland) Roy McBain	2000–2011	15	3	1	-	19
18=	(Scotland) Duncan Shearer	1997–2002	17	1	1	-	19
18=	(England) Miles Storey	2015–2016 2019–2021	17	1	1	-	19
18=	(England) Gary Warren	2012–2018	13	1	5	-	19
19	(England) George Oakley	2017–2019 2022–2023	13	1	4	-	18
20=	(Scotland) Martin Bavidge	1998–2002	16	0	1	-	17
20=	(Bulgaria) Nikolay Todorov	2019–2021	12	3	2	-	17
20=	(Scotland) Tom Walsh	2018–2020 2021–2023	13	2	2	-	17
20=	(Scotland) Bobby Mann	1999–2004	14	2	1	-	17
21=	(Scotland) Liam Polworth	2010–2019	15	1	0	-	16
21=	(England) Ross Draper	2012–2017	14	0	2	-	16
21=	(Scotland) Sean Welsh	2018–2024	12	4	0	-	16
21=	(Scotland) Daniel MacKay	2017–2021 2022–2023 2026–	10	4	2	-	16
21=	(Scotland) Grant Munro	1998–2011	12	0	4	-	16
22=	(England) Carl Tremarco	2013–2020	10	1	3	-	14
22=	(Scotland) Nick Ross	2009–2015	11	2	1	-	14
22=	(Scotland) Alfie Stewart	2025 2025–2026 2026–	12	0	2	-	14
22=	(Scotland) Richie Hart	2002–2008	12	0	2	-	14
23=	(England) Paul Cherry	1996–1999	12	0	1	-	13
23=	(England) Nathan Austin	2018–2019	10	0	3	-	13
23=	(England) Nathan Shaw	2022–2024	13	0	0	-	13
24=	(Scotland) Don Cowie	2007–2009	12	0	0	-	12
24=	(Zambia) Chanka Zimba	2025–2026	11	1	0	-	12
24=	(Northern Ireland) Danny Devine	2013–2016 2020–	9	2	1	-	12
24=	(Scotland) Craig Brewster	2004–2006 2007–2008	11	1	0	-	12
25=	(Scotland) Mike Teasdale	1995–2002	10	0	1	-	11
25=	(Scotland) Cameron Harper	2018–2024	9	0	2	-	11
25=	(Scotland) James Keatings	2019–2021	8	1	2	-	11
25=	(Scotland) Ryan Christie	2012–2015 2015–2016	11	0	0	-	11
25=	(Scotland) Steve Hislop	2002–2006	11	0	0	-	11
25=	(Scotland) David Bagan	2000–2003	10	1	0	-	11
25=	(Scotland) Keith Bray	2022–2025	10	0	1	-	11
25=	(England) Luis Longstaff	2023–	7	0	4	-	11
25=	(Scotland) Russell Duncan	2001–2011	9	1	1	-	11
26=	(Tanzania) Eric Odhiambo	2009–2011	10	0	0	-	10
26=	(Wales) Marley Watkins	2013–2015	8	2	0	-	10
26=	(Scotland) Dougie Imrie	2008–2010	7	1	2	-	10
26=	(Romania) Marius Niculae	2007–2008	8	0	2	-	10
26=	(Scotland) Paul Allan	2024–	9	0	1	-	10
26=	(Scotland) Davie Ross	1996–1998	9	1	0	-	10
27=	(France) Grégory Tadé	2011–2012	9	0	0	-	9
27=	(Scotland) John Rankin	2006–2008	9	0	0	-	9
27=	(Scotland) Shaun Rooney	2018–2020	8	1	0	-	9
27=	(Canada) David Wotherspoon	2023–2024; 2025–	7	1	1	-	9
27=	(Scotland) Graeme Shinnie	2009–2015 2026–	7	1	1	-	9
27=	(Scotland) Mark McCulloch	1997–2000	8	1	0	-	9
28=	(England) Alex Fisher	2016–2017	8	0	0	-	8
28=	(Scotland) Ian Black	2004–2009	8	0	0	-	8
28=	(Scotland) David Proctor	2003–2006 2007–2012	8	0	0	-	8
28=	(Scotland) Brad McKay	2016–2021	7	1	0	-	8
29=	(Spain) Dani Sánchez	2009–2011	5	1	1	-	7
29=	(Spain) Juanjo	2004–2006	7	0	0	-	7
29=	(Scotland) Stuart McCaffrey	2000–2008	6	1	0	-	7
29=	(England) Austin Samuels	2021–2024	6	0	1	-	7
29=	(Scotland) Calum MacLeod	2022–	6	0	1	-	7
29=	(Scotland) Roddy MacGregor	2018–2024 2026–	4	0	3	-	7
29=	(Scotland) Scott Allardice	2020–2023	7	0	0	-	7
30=	(England) Connor Bell	2017–2018	6	0	0	-	6
30=	(Guinea) Lonsana Doumbouya	2016–2017	5	1	0	-	6
30=	(Nigeria) Edward Ofere	2015	5	1	0	-	6
30=	(Scotland) Reece McAlear	2021–2022	6	0	0	-	6
30=	(England) Danny Williams	2013–2016	4	2	0	-	6
30=	(Scotland) Adam Mackinnon	2024–	5	0	1	-	6
31–50	50+ Players						

=== Top 10 non-UK goalscorers ===
Competitive, professional matches only, as of match played 14 April 2026.

# (non UK)	# (exc ROI)	Name	Years	League	Scottish Cup	League Cup	Europe	Total
1	x	(Republic of Ireland) Aaron Doran	2011–2024	38	11	6	-	55
2	x	(Republic of Ireland) Adam Rooney	2008–2011	44	5	4	-	53
3	x	(Republic of Ireland) Richie Foran	2009–2016	39	4	0	-	43
4	x	(Republic of Ireland) Jonny Hayes	2009–2012	23	2	0	-	25
5	1	(Canada) Davide Xausa	1999–2001	17	2	1	-	20
6	2	(Bulgaria) Nikolay Todorov	2019–2021	12	3	2	-	17
7	3	(Zambia) Chanka Zimba	2025–2026	11	1	0	-	12
8=	4=	(Romania) Marius Niculae	2007–2008	8	0	2	-	10
8=	4=	(Tanzania) Eric Odhiambo	2009–2011	10	0	0	-	10
9=	5=	(France) Grégory Tadé	2011–2012	9	0	0	-	9
9=	5=	(Canada) David Wotherspoon	2023–2024; 2025–	7	1	1	-	9
10=	6=	(Spain) Juanjo	2004–2006	7	0	0	-	7
10=	6=	(Spain) Dani Sánchez	2009–2011	5	1	1	-	7
11=	7=	(Guinea) Lonsana Doumbouya	2016–2017	5	1	0	-	6
11=	7=	(Nigeria) Edward Ofere	2015	5	1	0	-	6
12	8	(Portugal) Filipe Morais	2009	3	2	0	-	5
13	9	(Latvia) Nauris Bulvītis	2009–2010	2	1	1	-	4
14	10	(Finland) Markus Paatelainen	2007–2008	3	0	0	-	3

=== Goalkeeper Clean-Sheets ===
Competitive matches only, as of clean sheet on 20 November 2026

#	Player	Years	League	Scottish Cup	League Cup	Europe	Total
1	(Scotland) Mark Ridgers	2017–2024	77	5	4	-	86
2	(Scotland) Mark Brown	2002–2007	54	6	3	-	63
3	(Scotland) Jim Calder	1994–2002	44	3	1	-	48
4	(Scotland) Ryan Esson	2008–2022	39	3	3	-	45
5	(Scotland) Ross Munro	2025–	31	1	2	-	34
6	(England) Dean Brill	2013–2016	28	3	1	-	32
7=	(Wales) Owain Fôn Williams	2015–2019	12	2	2	1	17
7=	(Scotland) Les Fridge	1998–2002	16	0	1	-	17
8	(The Gambia) Musa Dibaga	2024–2025	13	0	0	-	13
9	(Scotland) Michael Fraser	2002–2009	10	2	0	-	12
10=	(Scotland) Cammy Mackay	2015–2024	3	2	3	-	8
10=	(Spain) Antonio Reguero	2012–2013	7	0	1	-	8
11=	(Scotland) Mark McRitchie	1994–1996	5	0	1	-	6
11=	(Scotland) Nicky Walker	2001–2002	5	1	0	-	6
12	(Northern Ireland) Jonny Tuffey	2010–2012	3	1	1	-	5
13	(Republic of Ireland) Marcus Gill	2025	2	0	0	-	2
14=	(Scotland) Kyle Allison	2009–2010	0	0	1	-	1
14=	(Scotland) Jack Newman	2024	0	0	1	-	1
14=	(Scotland) Don MacMillan	1996–1997	1	0	0	-	1
14=	(Poland) Zbigniew Małkowski	2007–2008	0	0	1	-	1

=== International caps ===
- First capped: Richard Hastings for Canada in 1998.
- First capped for Scotland: Andrew Shinnie in 2012.
- Most caps as an Inverness CT player: Richard Hastings - 38 caps for Canada.
- Most goals as an Inverness CT player: Richard Hastings and Marius Niculae - 1 goal for Canada and Romania, respectively
- First Inverness CT player to play at a World Cup: N/A

Score for capped country listed first

Player	Country	First Cap	Last Cap
Richard Hastings	Canada	1–0 vs. (North Macedonia) Macedonia, 18 May 1998	2–2 vs. Costa Rica, 11 July 2009
Davide Xausa	Canada	0–2 vs. Saudi Arabia, 9 July 1999	1–0 vs. Panama, 9 October 2000
Henri Anier	Estonia	0–0 vs. Cyprus, 25 March 2017	2–1 vs. Latvia, 12 June 2017
Lonsana Doumbouya	Guinea	1–2 vs. (Democratic Republic of the Congo) DR Congo, 13 November 2016	
Pāvels Mihadjuks	Latvia	4–0 vs. Luxembourg, 28 March 2009	2–0 vs. Luxembourg, 1 April 2009
Billy Mckay	Northern Ireland	0–0 vs. Malta, 6 February 2013	0–2 vs. Romania, 14 November 2014
Jonathan Tuffey	Northern Ireland	1–1 vs. Morocco, 17 November 2010	0–2 vs. Wales, 27 May 2011
Marius Niculae	Romania	3–0 vs. Russia, 26 March 2008	0–2 vs. Netherlands, 17 June 2008
Andrew Shinnie	Scotland	2–1 vs. Luxembourg, 14 November 2012	
Owain Fôn Williams	Wales	2–3 vs. Netherlands, 13 November 2015	
Owain Tudur Jones	Wales	1–2 vs. Australia, 10 August 2011	
Chanka Zimba	Zambia	0–5 vs. Argentina, 31 March 2026	

=== Transfers ===
==== Record Fee Paid ====
Player	From	Fee	Date
(Scotland) John Rankin	(Scotland) Ross County	£87,000	July 2006
(Scotland) Dougie Imrie	(Scotland) Clyde	£65,000	January 2008
(Republic of Ireland) Adam Rooney	(England) Stoke City	£56,000	July 2008
(Scotland) Miller Keir	(Scotland) Turriff United	£30,000	July 2026
(Scotland) Martin Glancy	(Scotland) Dumbarton	£26,000	February 1999

==== Record Fee Received ====
Player	To	Fee	Date
(Scotland) Ryan Christie	(Scotland) Celtic	£595,000	September 2015
(Romania) Marius Niculae	(Romania) Dinamo București	£525,000	July 2008
(Scotland) Craig Brewster	(Scotland) Dundee United	£350,000	January 2006
(Scotland) Daniel MacKay	(Scotland) Hibernian	£203,000	July 2021
(Northern Ireland) Billy Mckay	(England) Wigan Athletic	£175,000	January 2015
(Scotland) John Rankin	(Scotland) Hibernian	£110,000	January 2008
(Scotland) Barry Wilson	(Scotland) Livingston	£115,000	July 2000
(England) Ross Draper	(Scotland) Ross County	£100,000	August 2017
(Scotland) Don Cowie	(England) Watford	£60,000	February 2009
(Scotland) Barry Robson	(Scotland) Dundee United	£53,000	May 2003

=== Hat-tricks ===
All recorded hat-tricks in all professional competitions since 1994–95

No.	Player	Competition	H/A	Score	Opponent	Date
1	(Scotland) Alan Hercher	Scottish Third Division	H	5–2	Arbroath	13 August 1994
2	(Scotland) Charlie Christie	Scottish Third Division	A	0–5	Alloa Athletic	23 September 1995
3	(Scotland) Iain Stewart	Scottish Third Division	H	6–1	Albion Rovers	21 October 1995
4	(Scotland) Iain Stewart	Scottish Third Division	A	1–5	East Stirlingshire	20 January 1996
5	(Scotland) Iain Stewart	Scottish Third Division	H	3–2	Montrose	5 April 1997
6	(Scotland) Brian Thomson	Scottish League Cup	H	5–1	Stenhousemuir	2 August 1997
7	(Scotland) Iain Stewart	Scottish Second Division	A	1–5	East Fife	25 October 1997
8	(Scotland) Paul Sheerin	Scottish Challenge Cup Final	N	4–4	Alloa Athletic	21 November 1999
9	(Canada) Davide Xausa	Scottish First Division	H	4–1	Livingston	18 March 2000
10	(Scotland) Dennis Wyness	Scottish First Division	H	7–3	Ayr United	2 December 2000
11	(Scotland) Dennis Wyness	Scottish First Division	H	4–2	Morton	13 March 2001
12	(Scotland) Dennis Wyness	Scottish First Division	H	5–1	Arbroath	8 September 2001
13	(Scotland) Dennis Wyness^{4}	Scottish First Division	H	5–2	Raith Rovers	19 September 2001
14	(Scotland) Paul Ritchie	Scottish First Division	H	4–2	St Mirren	2 March 2002
15	(Scotland) Dennis Wyness	Scottish First Division	A	0–6	Alloa Athletic	19 October 2002
16	(Scotland) Paul Ritchie	Scottish First Division	A	0–6	Alloa Athletic	19 October 2002
17	(Scotland) Paul Ritchie	Scottish First Division	H	5–3	Queen of the South	16 November 2002
18	(Scotland) Paul Ritchie	Scottish First Division	H	3–1	St Mirren	1 March 2003
19	(Scotland) Paul Ritchie	Scottish First Division	A	1–5	Alloa Athletic	16 April 2003
20	(Scotland) Paul Ritchie	Scottish Cup	H	5–1	Brechin City	10 January 2004
21	(Republic of Ireland) Richie Foran	Scottish First Division	A	1–5	Ayr United	24 October 2009
22	(Republic of Ireland) Adam Rooney	Scottish First Division	H	4–1	Morton	31 October 2009
23	(Republic of Ireland) Adam Rooney	Scottish First Division	H	3–1	Queen of the South	9 March 2010
24	(Republic of Ireland) Adam Rooney	Scottish Premier League	H	4–2	Hibernian	20 November 2010
25	(Scotland) Andrew Shinnie	Scottish Premier League	A	3–6	Kilmarnock	5 November 2011
26	(Northern Ireland) Billy Mckay	Scottish Premier League	A	4–4	Dundee United	15 December 2012
27	(Northern Ireland) Billy Mckay	Scottish Premier League	H	4–3	Motherwell	4 May 2013
28	(Scotland) Iain Vigurs	Scottish League Cup	A	1–5	Dunfermline Athletic	26 July 2016
29	(England) Scott Boden	Scottish League Cup	H	7–0	Arbroath	30 July 2016
30	(England) Nathan Austin	Scottish Championship	H	5–1	Dumbarton	14 April 2018
31	(Scotland) Jordan White	Scottish Cup	H	6–1	Edinburgh City	4 December 2018
32	(Northern Ireland) Billy Mckay	Scottish Challenge Cup	A	2–4	Elgin City	9 October 2021
33	(Northern Ireland) Billy Mckay	Scottish Championship	H	6–1	Cove Rangers	2 January 2023
34	(Wales) Alex Samuel	Scottish Championship	A	2–3	Raith Rovers	27 January 2024
35	(Scotland) Keith Bray	Scottish League One	A	0–3	Cove Rangers	5 April 2025
36	(Zambia) Chanka Zimba	Scottish Challenge Cup	H	4–1	Aberdeen 'B'	26 August 2025
37	(Zambia) Chanka Zimba	Scottish Challenge Cup	H	6–0	Dundee United 'B'	11 November 2025
38	(Scotland) Alfie Bavidge^{4}	Scottish Challenge Cup	A	0–9	Dumbarton	16 December 2025

== Club records ==
=== Matches ===
==== Firsts ====
- First match: vs. RAF Kinloss, Drew 1–1, Friendly, RAF Kinloss, (A), 20 July 1994.
- First League Match: vs. Arbroath, Won 5–2, Scottish Third Division, Telford Street Park, (H), 13 August 1994.
- First Scottish Cup Match: vs. Queen of the South, Lost 2–1, Scottish Cup, Telford Street Park, (H), 17 December 1994.
- First League Cup Match: vs. East Stirlingshire, Won 2–0, Scottish League Cup, Firs Park, (A), 9 August 1994.
- First Challenge Cup Match: vs. Dundee, Lost 4–3 on penalties, Scottish Challenge Cup, Telford Street Park, (H), 28 September 1994.
- First European Match: vs. Astra Giurgiu, Lost 1–0, UEFA Europa League 2nd Qualifying Round, Caledonian Stadium, (H), 16 July 2015.

==== Wins ====
- Record win (all competitions):
  - 9–0 against Dumbarton in Scottish Challenge Cup at Dumbarton Football Stadium on 16 December 2025.
- Record League win:
  - Home: 5–0 against St Mirren on 6 May 2000; Raith Rovers on 12 January 2001; Arbroath on 21 September 2001; Brechin City on 29 November 2003; Greenock Morton on 30 August 2019, and 6–1 against Albion Rovers on 21 October 1995; Gretna on 3 May 2008; and Cove Rangers on 2 January 2023.
  - Away: 7–0 against Ayr United in Scottish First Division at Somerset Park on 24 April 2010.
- Record Scottish Cup win:
  - Home: 8–1 against Annan Athletic in 3rd round on 24 January 1998.
  - Away: 6–1 against Stirling Albion in 3rd round at Forthbank Stadium on 6 January 2007.
- Record League Cup win:
  - Home: 7–0 against Arbroath in Group Stage on 30 July 2016.
  - Away: 5–1 against Dunfermline Athletic in Group Stage at East End Park on 26 July 2016, and 6–2 against East Kilbride in Group Stage at K-Park Training Academy on 22 July 2025.
- Record Challenge Cup win:
  - Home: 6–0 against Dundee 'B' in League Phase on 23 September 2025, and Dundee United 'B' in League Phase on 11 November 2025.
  - Away: 9–0 against Dumbarton in Second Round at Dumbarton Football Stadium on 16 December 2025.
- Record European win:
  - Home: N/A
  - Away: N/A

==== Defeats ====
- Record defeat (all competitions):
  - 0–6 against Airdrieonians in Scottish First Division at Excelsior Stadium on 22 September 2001.
  - 0–6 against Celtic in Scottish League Cup at Celtic Park on 22 September 2010.
  - 0–6 against Celtic in Scottish Premiership at Celtic Park on 27 April 2014.
  - 0–6 against Celtic in Scottish Cup at Celtic Park on 11 February 2017.
  - 0–6 against Dundee in Scottish League Cup at Glebe Park on 27 July 2024.
- Record League defeat:
  - Home: 0–4 against Queen's Park on 20 August 1994; Forfar Athletic on 3 May 1997; Partick Thistle on 13 December 2014; Celtic on 1 March 2017, and 1–5 against Airdrieonians on 15 April 2000; Ross County on 25 Feb 2003; and Motherwell on 18 November 2012.
  - Away: 0–6 against Airdrieonians at Excelsior Stadium on 22 September 2001, and Celtic at Celtic Park on 27 April 2014.
- Record Scottish Cup defeat:
  - Home: 0–5 against Dundee United in Quarter Final on 9 March 2014.
  - Away: 0–6 against Celtic in Fifth round at Celtic Park on 11 February 2017.
- Record League Cup defeat:
  - Home: 0–3 against Aberdeen in 2nd round on 8 August 1998.
  - Away: 0–6 against Celtic in 3rd round at Celtic Park on 22 September 2010, and Dundee in Group Stage at Glebe Park on 27 July 2024.
- Record Challenge Cup defeat:
  - Home: 0–3 against Arbroath in 1st round on 2 August 2016.
  - Away: 1–4 against Raith Rovers in Final at Firhill Stadium on 5 April 2026.
- Record European defeat:
  - Home: 0–1 against Astra Giurgiu in UEFA Europa League Second Qualifying Round on 16 July 2015.
  - Away: N/A

=== League Breakdown ===
Scottish Premier League/Scottish Premiership (Tier One)

- Most points in a season: 65, in 2014–15
- Fewest points in a season: 34, in 2016–17
- Most goals scored in a season: 64, in 2012–13
- Fewest goals scored in a season: 37, in 2008–09
- Most goals conceded in a season: 71, in 2016–17
- Fewest goals conceded in a season: 38, in 2005–06
- Best goal difference: +13, in 2005–06
- Worst goal difference: –27, in 2016–17
- First season in division: 2004–05 Scottish Premier League
- Latest season in division: 2016–17 Scottish Premiership

Scottish First Division/Scottish Championship (Tier Two)

- Most points in a season: 73, in 2009–10
- Fewest points in a season: 36, in 2020–21*; 42, in 2023–24^{†}
- Most goals scored in a season: 74, in 2002–03
- Fewest goals scored in a season: 36, in 2020–21*; 41, in 2023–24^{†}
- Most goals conceded in a season: 55, in 1999–2000
- Fewest goals conceded in a season: 31, in 2020–21*; 32, in 2009–10^{†}
- Best goal difference: +40, in 2009–10
- Worst goal difference: +1, in 2023–24
- First season in division: 1999–2000 Scottish First Division
- Latest season in division: 2026–27 Scottish Championship

*Season curtailed due to COVID-19 Pandemic ^{†}Full 36-game season

Scottish Second Division/Scottish League One (Tier Three)

- Most points in a season: 72, in 1998–99
- Fewest points in a season: 43, in 2024–25*; 49, in 1997–98
- Most goals scored in a season: 80, in 1998–99
- Fewest goals scored in a season: 45, in 2024–25
- Most goals conceded in a season: 56, in 1998–99
- Fewest goals conceded in a season: 24, in 2025–26
- Best goal difference: +36, in 2025–26
- Worst goal difference: +7, in 2024–25
- First season in division: 1997–98 Scottish Second Division
- Latest season in division: 2025–26 Scottish League One

*15 point deduction for entering administration.

Scottish Third Division/Scottish League Two (Tier Four)

- Most points in a season: 76, in 1996–97
- Fewest points in a season: 45, in 1994–95
- Most goals scored in a season: 70, in 1996–97
- Fewest goals scored in a season: 48, in 1994–95
- Most goals conceded in a season: 61, in 1994–95
- Fewest goals conceded in a season: 37, in 1996–97
- Best goal difference: +33, in 1996–97
- Worst goal difference: –13, in 1994–95
- First season in division: 1994–95 Scottish Third Division
- Latest season in division: 1996–97 Scottish Third Division

== Attendances ==
At Telford Street Park

- Highest attendance: 4,931 v Ross County, Scottish Third Division, 23 January 1996.
- Lowest attendance: 491 v Albion Rovers, Scottish Third Division, 11 April 1995.

At Caledonian Stadium

- Highest attendance: 7,753 v Rangers, Scottish Premier League, 20 January 2008.*
- Lowest attendance: 300 v Raith Rovers, Scottish Championship, 21 November 2020; and Dundee, Scottish Championship 12 December 2020.
- Lowest attendance (excluding capacity limits): 390 v. Dundee United 'B', Scottish Challenge Cup League Phase, 11 November 2025.

*During the COVID-19 pandemic, where fans were not permitted inside stadia, Inverness and Hearts fans virtually sold out the stadium for the match between the two on 26 February 2021, with the final count being 11,356. Though not an official attendance, it is the largest number of tickets sold for a home match involving the club.

At Pittodrie Stadium

- Highest attendance: 9,530 v Aberdeen, Scottish Premier League, 16 October 2004.
- Lowest attendance: 1,125 v Dundee United, Scottish Premier League, 23 November 2004.

(Groundshare whilst the Caledonian Stadium was being redeveloped to meet SPL Capacity requirements)

At Tannadice Park*

- 11,296 v Rangers, 1995–96 Scottish Cup Quarter Final, 9 March 1996.

*One-off, as Telford Street was deemed unsuitable for a Scottish Cup Quarter Final.

Record attendance involving the club: 47,247 against Celtic, 2023 Scottish Cup Final, Hampden Park, 3 June 2023.

== Best and Worst Finishes ==
Scottish Premier League/Premiership (Tier 1)

- Highest finish: 3rd in 2014–15.
- Lowest finish: 12th in 2008–09 and 2016–17.

Scottish First Division/Championship (Tier 2)

- Highest finish: 1st in 2003–04 and 2009–10.
- Lowest finish: 9th in 2023–24.

Scottish Second Division/League One (Tier 3)

- Highest finish: 1st in 2025–26.
- Lowest finish: 7th in 2024–25.

Scottish Third Division/League Two (Tier 4)

- Highest finish: 1st in 1996–97.
- Lowest finish: 6th in 1994–95.

Scottish Cup

- Best finish: Winners in 2014–15.
- Worst finish: First round in 1994–95.

Scottish League Cup

- Best finish: Finalists in 2013–14.
- Worst finish: First round; 1995–96 and 2003–04, and Group Stage; 2017–18 to 2021–22 and 2023–24 to 2025–26.

Scottish Challenge Cup

- Best finish: Winners in 2003–04, 2017–18 and 2019–20.
- Worst finish: First round in 1995–96, 1997–98, 2002–03 and 2018–19.

UEFA Europa League

- Best and Worst finish: 2nd Qualifying round in 2015–16.

== Managers ==
This list is of every individual who has managed Inverness, either permanently or as a caretaker role, as well as their honours.

† indicates caretaker managers

^{2}, ^{3}, etc. indicate multiple managerial spells

Name	From	To	Played	Won	Drawn	Lost	Win%	Honours	Departure Reason
(Ukraine) Sergei Baltacha	1994	1995	40	13	10	17	32.50		Resigned
(Scotland) Steve Paterson	1995	2002	329	147	92	90	44.68	1996–97 Scottish Third Division 1999–2000 Scottish Challenge Cup Runner Up	Appointed by Aberdeen
(Scotland) Graeme Bennett † & (Scotland) John Docherty †	2002		2	0	2	0	0.00		Interim
(Scotland) John Robertson	2002	2004	84	44	13	27	52.38	2003–04 Scottish First Division 2003–04 Scottish Challenge Cup Winner	Appointed by Heart of Midlothian
(Scotland) Donald Park †	2004		3	0	2	1	0.00		Interim
(Scotland) Craig Brewster	2004	2006	50	17	18	15	34.00		Player Manager, appointed by Dundee United
(Scotland) Charlie Christie	2006	2007	67	24	18	15	42.10		Resigned
(Scotland) Donald Park ^{2}†	2007		2	1	0	1	50.00		Interim
(Scotland) Craig Brewster ^{2}	2007	2009	64	22	7	35	34.38		Sacked
(Scotland) John Docherty ^{2}†	2009		1	0	0	1	0.00		Interim
(England) Terry Butcher	2009	2013	209	87	58	64	41.68	2009–10 Scottish First Division 2009–10 Scottish Challenge Cup Runner Up	Appointed by Hibernian
(Scotland) Duncan Shearer † & (Scotland) Scott Kellacher †	2013		2	2	0	0	100.00		Interim
(Scotland) John Hughes	2013	2016	122	50	31	41	41.30	2013–14 Scottish League Cup Runner Up 2014–15 Scottish Cup Winner	Resigned
(Republic of Ireland) Richie Foran	2016	2017	45	13	11	21	24.44		Sacked
(Scotland) John Robertson ^{2}	2017	2021	173	65	34	38	47.45	2017–18 Scottish Challenge Cup Winner 2019–20 Scottish Challenge Cup Winner	Compassionate Leave, delegated to Sporting director
(Scotland) Neil McCann †	2021		16	6	6	4	37.50		Interim
(Scotland) Billy Dodds	2021	2023	108	44	31	33	40.74	2022–23 Scottish Cup Runner Up	Sacked
(Scotland) John Robertson ^{3}† & (Scotland) Charlie Christie ^{2}†	2023		1	0	0	1	0.00		Interim
(Scotland) Duncan Ferguson	2023	2024	53	17	16	20	32.07		Sacked after club entered administration.
(Scotland) Scott Kellacher ^{2}	2024	Present	10	5	1	4	50.00	2025–26 Scottish Challenge Cup Runner Up 2025–26 Scottish League One	
