= List of Inverness Caledonian Thistle F.C. players =

This is a list of footballers notable for their contributions to Inverness Caledonian Thistle, from the formation of the club in 1994 to present. It generally includes only players who made more than 100 league appearances for the club, but some players with fewer than 100 appearances are also included. This includes players who represented their national team while with the club, and players who have set a club record, such as most appearances, most goals or biggest transfer fee.

== Notable players ==
Players who represented their country while at the club.
Club record holder.

Bold type indicates that the player currently plays for the club.

Updated 28 May 2022

Name	Nationality	Position (Note: For a full description of positions see Association football positions.)	Inverness CT career	League appearances	League goals	Notes
Henri Anier	Estonia	FW	2017	13	0	
Graham Bayne	Scotland	FW	2004–2008	119	15	(Note: Some sources credit Bayne with scoring 16 goals due to a dubious goal scored against Dundee in October 2004.)
Ian Black	Scotland	MF	2004–2009	132	8	
Mark Brown	Scotland	GK	2002–2007	170	0	
Jim Calder	Scotland	GK	1994–2002	167	0	
David Carson	England	DF	2019–2024	102	2	
Charlie Christie	Scotland	MF	1994–2004	257	32	
Ryan Christie	Scotland	MF	2012–2015	63	10	(Note: Christie holds the record for highest transfer fee received by the club.)
**Daniel Devine**	Northern Ireland	DF	2013–	119	2	
Darren Dods	Scotland	DF	2004–2007	100	7	
Aaron Doran	Republic of Ireland	MF	2011–	259	35	
Lonsana Doumbouya	Guinea	FW	2016–2017	19	5	
Ross Draper	England	MF	2012–2017	170	14	
Russell Duncan	Scotland	MF	2001–2011	289	9	
Ryan Esson	Scotland	GK	2008–2018	163	0	
Owain Fôn Williams	Wales	GK	2015–2019	71	0	
Richie Foran	Republic of Ireland	MF	2009–2016	168	38	
Stuart Golabek	Scotland	DF	1999–2011	211	4	
Richie Hart	Scotland	MF	2002–2008	142	12	
Richard Hastings	Canada	DF	1994–2009	313	3	
Bobby Mann	Scotland	DF	1999–2004	171	15	
Roy McBain	Scotland	MF	2000–2011	285	15	
Stuart McCaffrey	Scotland	DF	2000–2008	163	6	
Mark McCulloch	Scotland	DF	1997–2000	100	8	
**Billy McKay**	Northern Ireland	FW	2011–	167	67	
Brad McKay	Scotland	DF	2016–2021	124	7	
Josh Meekings	England	DF	2011–2017	163	6	
Pāvels Mihadjuks	Latvia	DF	2009	12	1	
Grant Munro	Scotland	DF	1999–2011	314	13	
Marius Niculae	Romania	FW	2007–2008	35	8	
Liam Polworth	Scotland	MF	2010–2019	166	15	
David Proctor	Scotland	DF	2003–2012	139	11	
John Rankin	Scotland	MF	2006–2008	49	9	(Note: Rankin holds the record for highest transfer fee paid by the club.)
David Raven	England	DF	2012–2018	153	3	
Mark Ridgers	Scotland	GK	2017–2024	147	0	
Paul Ritchie	Scotland	FW	2001–2004	103	47	
Barry Robson	Scotland	MF	1997–2003	135	17	
Adam Rooney	Republic of Ireland	FW	2008–2011	103	44	
Nick Ross	Scotland	MF	2009–2015	149	11	
Paul Sheerin	Scotland	MF	1998–2001	115	36	
Andrew Shinnie	Scotland	MF	2011–2013	57	19	
Graeme Shinnie	Scotland	DF	2009–2015	156	6	
Iain Stewart	Scotland	FW	1995–2001	117	70	(Note: Stewart holds the club record for most goals scored in a single season.)
Shane Sutherland	Scotland	FW	2010–2023	131	16	
Greg Tansey	England	MF	2011–2017	182	25	
Mike Teasdale	Scotland	DF	1995–2002	182	16	
Ross Tokely	Scotland	DF	1996–2012	456	30	(Note: Tokely holds the club record for appearances.)
Carl Tremarco	England	DF	2013–2020	165	10	
Owain Tudur Jones	Wales	MF	2011–2013	48	2	
Jonathan Tuffey	Northern Ireland	GK	2010–2012	8	0	
Iain Vigurs	Scotland	MF	2007–2018	113	16	
Gary Warren	England	DF	2012–2018	181	13	
Sean Welsh	Scotland	MF	2018–2024	100	12	
Barry Wilson	Scotland	MF	1996–2008	253	60	
Dennis Wyness	Scotland	FW	1999–2008	199	81	(Note: Wyness holds the club record for most goals scored.)
Davide Xausa	Canada	FW	1999–2001	41	17	

== Key to positions ==
- GK — Goalkeeper
- DF — Defender
- MF — Midfielder
- FW — Forward
