= 1999–2000 Inverness Caledonian Thistle F.C. season =

Scottish football club season

Inverness Caledonian Thistle F.C.
1999–2000 season
- Manager: Steve Paterson
- Scottish First Division: 6th
- Scottish Cup: 4th Round
- Scottish League Cup: 3rd Round
- Scottish Challenge Cup: Finalists
- Top goalscorer: League: Barry Wilson (13); All: Paul Sheerin (17)
- Highest home attendance: 6,290 vs. Aberdeen, 20 February 2000
- Lowest home attendance: 635 vs. Clydebank, 14 September 1999

Inverness Caledonian Thistle F.C. in their sixth season in the Scottish Football League competed in the Scottish First Division, Scottish League Cup, the Scottish Challenge Cup, the Scottish Challenge Cup where they made their first major final against Second Division team Alloa Athletic where they lost on a penalty shoot-out after a 4–4 draw and Scottish Cup where they famously beat Scottish Premier League team Celtic 3–1 in the 3rd Round in season 1999–2000.

== Results ==
=== Scottish First Division ===
Match Day	Date	Opponent	H/A	Score	ICT Scorer(s)	Attendance
1	7 August	Dunfermline Athletic	A	0–4		4,677
2	14 August	Falkirk	H	2–3	Sheerin, Tokely	3,022
3	21 August	St Mirren	A	2–3	Sheerin, Teasdale	3,040
4	28 August	Ayr United	A	0–1		2,157
5	4 September	Greenock Morton	H	1–1	Glancy	2,414
6	11 September	Clydebank	H	1–0	Sheerin	1,697
7	18 September	Livingston	A	2–2	Bavidge, Sheerin	2,584
8	25 September	Raith Rovers	H	0–2		2,961
9	2 October	Airdrieonians	A	1–1	Glancy	2,097
10	16 October	Falkirk	A	2–0	Wyness, McLean	2,403
11	23 October	Dunfermline Athletic	H	1–1	Bavidge	3,006
12	30 October	Clydebank	A	3–0	Sheerin, Teasdale, Wilson	220
13	6 November	Livingston	H	2–0	Golabek, McLean	2,474
14	12 November	Greenock Morton	A	1–5	Tokely	812
15	27 November	Airdrieonians	H	2–0	Wilson, Xausa	2,022
16	30 November	Ayr United	H	1–1	Christie	1,073
17	4 December	Raith Rovers	A	2–4	Sheerin, Bavidge	1,971
18	11 December	St Mirren	H	1–1	Wilson	2,893
19	18 December	Dunfermline Athletic	H	0–1		3,775
20	27 December	Clydebank	H	4–1	Sheerin (2), Wilson (2)	1,640
21	3 January	Livingston	A	1–1	Wilson	2,656
22	8 January	Greenock Morton	H	6–2	Wilson (2), Byers, Bavidge, Sheerin, Tokely	1,524
23	22 January	Raith Rovers	H	1–1	Glancy	2,302
24	5 February	Airdrieonians	A	4–1	Wyness, Sheerin, Xausa, Wilson	1,597
25	12 February	St Mirren	A	0–2		3,742
26	26 February	Falkirk	H	0–3		2,727
27	4 March	Clydebank	A	1–0	Wyness	168
28	7 March	Ayr United	A	3–1	Wilson, Sheerin, Xausa	1,274
29	18 March	Livingston	H	4–1	Xausa (3), Wyness	2,206
30	25 March	Ayr United	H	1–1	Wilson	1,790
31	1 April	Greenock Morton	A	2–0	Wyness, Xausa	567
32	8 April	Raith Rovers	A	0–2		2,538
33	15 April	Airdrieonians	H	1–5	Wyness	1,404
34	22 April	Dunfermline Athletic	A	1–2	Xausa	2,677
35	29 April	Falkirk	A	2–2	Xausa, Wilson	4,449
36	6 May	St Mirren	H	5–0	McCulloch (2), Xausa, Wilson, Bavidge	3,218

==== Final League table ====
Pos	Team	Pld	W	D	L	GF	GA	GD	Pts
4	Livingston	36	19	7	10	60	45	+15	64
5	Raith Rovers	36	17	8	11	55	40	+15	59
6	Inverness CT	36	13	10	13	60	55	+5	49
7	Ayr United	36	10	8	18	42	52	−10	38
8	Morton	36	10	6	20	45	61	−16	36

Source: "1999-2000 First Division - SPFL Archive". SPFL.
Rules for classification: 1) points; 2) goal difference; 3) number of goals scored.

=== Scottish League Cup ===
Round	Date	Opponent	H/A	Score	ICT Scorer(s)	Attendance
R1	31 July	Stenhousemuir	A	3–1	McLean, Wilson	528
R2	17 August	St Mirren	H	2–0 (aet)	Sheerin, Byers	1,238
R3	12 October	Motherwell	H	0–1		2,195

=== Scottish Challenge Cup ===
Round	Date	Opponent	H/A	Score	ICT Scorer(s)	Attendance
R1	10 August	St Mirren	H	1–0	Teasdale	1,343
R2	24 August	Hamilton Academical	A	3–0	Stewart (2), McLean	298
QF	14 September	Clydebank	H	2–0	Glancy, Robson	635
SF	28 September	Livingston	H	1–0	Sheerin	1,025
Final	21 November	Alloa Athletic	N	4–4 (aet, Alloa won 5–4 on penalties)	Sheerin (3), Wilson	4,047

=== Scottish Cup ===
Round	Date	Opponent	H/A	Score	ICT Scorer(s)	Attendance
R3	8 February	Celtic	A	3–1	Wilson, Moravcik (own goal), Sheerin	34,389
R4	20 February	Aberdeen	H	1–1	Mann	6,290
R4 R	29 February	Aberdeen	A	0–1		18,451

== Hat-tricks ==
Player	Competition	Score	Opponent	Date
(Scotland) Paul Sheerin	Scottish Challenge Cup Final	4–4	Alloa Athletic	21 November 1999
(Canada) Davide Xausa	Scottish First Division	4–1	Livingston	18 March 2000
