= 1998–99 Inverness Caledonian Thistle F.C. season =

Scottish football club season

Inverness Caledonian Thistle F.C.
1998–99 season
- Manager: Steve Paterson
- Scottish Second Division: 2nd
- Scottish Cup: 2nd Round
- Scottish League Cup: 2nd Round
- Top goalscorer: League: Scott McLean (19); All: Scott McLean (20)
- Highest home attendance: 5,164 vs. Aberdeen, 8 August 1998
- Lowest home attendance: 1,323 vs. Alloa Athletic, 16 December 1998

Inverness Caledonian Thistle F.C. competed in the Scottish Second Division in season 1998–99 and the Scottish League Cup and Scottish Cup.

== Results ==
=== Scottish Second Division ===
Match Day	Date	Opponent	H/A	Score	ICT Scorer(s)	Attendance
1	4 August	Partick Thistle	A	1–0	Wilson	1,998
2	15 August	Livingston	H	2–1	Shearer, Wilson	1,897
3	22 August	Alloa Athletic	A	1–1	Tokely	616
4	29 August	East Fife	A	5–1	Sheerin, Shearer, Cherry, Bavidge, Teasdale	599
5	5 September	Arbroath	H	2–1	Crawford (own goal), Shearer	1,842
6	12 September	Queen of the South	H	3–2	Sheerin, McLean, Wilson	1,912
7	19 September	Stirling Albion	A	0–1		916
8	26 September	Clyde	A	1–2	Cherry	978
9	3 October	Forfar Athletic	H	2–2	McLean, Wilson	1,925
10	10 October	Livingston	A	1–2	McLean	4,100
11	17 October	Partick Thistle	H	3–2	McLean (2), Sheerin	2,598
12	24 October	East Fife	H	4–2	Shearer, Christie, Sheerin, McLean	1,547
13	31 October	Arbroath	A	1–0	Cherry	934
14	7 November	Stirling Albion	H	3–1	McLean (2), Wilson	2,026
15	14 November	Queen of the South	A	2–2	Sheerin, McLean	1,021
16	21 November	Clyde	H	1–1	Wilson	2,268
17	28 November	Forfar Athletic	A	2–2	Shearer, McLean	510
18	16 December	Alloa Athletic	H	3–2	Robertson, McCulloch, McLean	1,323
19	19 December	Partick Thistle	A	1–2	Wilson	2,141
20	27 December	East Fife	A	2–3	Teasdale, McLean	994
21	9 January	Arbroath	H	2–0	Wilson, Sheerin	1,795
22	16 January	Clyde	A	1–1	Glancy	1,105
23	30 January	Forfar Athletic	H	2–0	Wilson, Christie	2,018
24	6 February	Stirling Albion	A	5–1	Glancy (2), Sheerin, McCulloch, Teasdale	890
25	13 February	Queen of the South	H	1–0	Rowe (own goal)	2,204
26	20 February	Alloa Athletic	A	4-1	Shearer (2), Wilson, Christie	595
27	27 February	Livingston	H	3–1	McLean, Wilson, Shearer	3,279
28	6 March	Arbroath	A	1–3	McLean	705
29	13 March	East Fife	H	4–0	McLean, Wilson, Sheerin, Teasdale	1,797
30	20 March	Forfar Athletic	A	3–0	McLean (2), Sheerin	304
31	3 April	Clyde	H	3–0	Wilson, Sheerin, Shearer	3,019
32	10 April	Stirling Albion	H	2–2	Shearer (2)	1,778
33	17 April	Queen of the South	A	1–1	Wilson	1,214
34	24 April	Partick Thistle	H	3–2	McLean (2), McCulloch	3,246
35	1 May	Livingston	A	3–4	McCulloch, Christie, Stewart	6,013
36	8 May	Alloa Athletic	H	2-1	Stewart	2,662

==== Final League table ====
Pos	Team	Pld	W	D	L	GF	GA	GD	Pts	Promotion or relegation
1	Livingston (C, P)	36	22	11	3	64	35	+29	77	Promotion to the First Division
2	Inverness CT (P)	36	21	9	6	80	48	+32	72	Promotion to the First Division
3	Clyde	36	15	8	13	46	42	+4	53	
4	Queen of the South	36	13	9	14	50	45	+5	48	
5	Alloa Athletic	36	13	7	16	65	56	+9	46	

Source: "1998-1999 Second Division - SPFL Archive". SPFL.
Rules for classification: 1) points; 2) goal difference; 3) number of goals scored.
(C) Champions; (P) Promoted

=== Scottish League Cup ===
Round	Date	Opponent	H/A	Score	ICT Scorer(s)	Attendance
R1	1 August	Queen of the South	A	4–1	Sheerin, McLean, Shearer, Cherry	1,227
R2	8 August	Aberdeen	H	0-3		5,164

=== Scottish Cup ===
Round	Date	Opponent	H/A	Score	ICT Scorer(s)	Attendance
R2	2 January	Livingston	H	1–2	McManus (own goal)	3,367
