= 2000–01 Inverness Caledonian Thistle F.C. season =

Scottish football club season

Inverness Caledonian Thistle F.C.
2000–01 season
- Manager: Steve Paterson
- Scottish First Division: 4th
- Scottish Cup: 4th Round
- Scottish League Cup: 2nd Round
- Scottish Challenge Cup: 2nd Round
- Top goalscorer: League: Dennis Wyness (25); All: Dennis Wyness (26)
- Highest home attendance: 5,294 vs. Kilmarnock, 17 February 2001
- Lowest home attendance: 664 vs. Stranraer, 2 September 2000

Inverness Caledonian Thistle F.C. in their seventh season in the Scottish Football League competed in the Scottish First Division, Scottish League Cup, Scottish Challenge Cup and the Scottish Cup in season 2000–01.

== Results ==
=== Scottish First Division ===
Match Day	Date	Opponent	H/A	Score	ICT Scorer(s)	Attendance
1	5 August	Airdrieonians	H	2-0	Tokely 14, Xausa 83	2,366
2	12 August	Livingston	A	1–3	Stewart 75	3,838
3	19 August	Falkirk	A	2–3	Bavidge 53, 79	2,132
4	26 August	Raith Rovers	A	1–4	Stewart 59	1,615
5	9 September	Clyde	H	1–2	Bagan 16	1,484
6	16 September	Ross County	H	0–1		4,823
7	23 September	Alloa Athletic	A	4–1	Robson 14, Sheerin 39, Xausa 74, Bavidge 84	584
8	30 September	Ayr United	A	3–3	Xausa 62, Sheerin 85, Mann 89	2,070
9	7 October	Greenock Morton	H	4–0	McBain 32, Bavidge 44, 77, Bagan 81	1,479
10	14 October	Airdrieonians	A	2–1	Sheerin 61, Xausa 86	1,555
11	21 October	Livingston	H	2–2	McBain 54, Sheerin 83	2,147
12	28 October	Raith Rovers	H	1–2	Sheerin 79	1,723
13	4 November	Clyde	A	1–1	Wyness 6	935
14	11 November	Alloa Athletic	H	2–1	Teasdale 32, Sheerin 79	1,384
15	18 November	Ross County	A	3–0	Wyness 36, 72, Teasdale 56	5,761
16	25 November	Greenock Morton	A	0–2		708
17	2 December	Ayr United	H	7–3	Teasdale 8, Sheerin (pen) 17, Wyness 42, 79, 86, Bagan 58, 73	1,513
18	9 December	Falkirk	A	2-2	Wyness 66, Sheerin 82	2,136
19	16 December	Airdrieonians	H	4–0	Bagan 7, Christie 42, Xausa 62, Wyness 72	1,570
20	23 December	Clyde	H	2–2	Bagan 45, Xausa 79	1,588
21	2 January	Ross County	H	3–3	Sheerin 12, Wyness 89, 90	5,291
22	6 January	Alloa Athletic	A	1–1	Xausa 25	744
23	13 January	Ayr United	A	1–1	Wyness 21	2,534
24	3 February	Falkirk	H	1–1	Wyness 67	1,913
25	10 March	Raith Rovers	A	1–1	Wyness 51	1,342
26	13 March	Greenock Morton	H	4-2	Wyness 3, 50, 56 Bagan 28	1,016
27	17 March	Alloa Athletic	H	2–0	Wyness 51 Robson 86	1,613
28	23 March	Raith Rovers	H	2–0	Wyness 53, 80	1,299
29	27 March	Clyde	A	2–2	Bagan 11 Wyness 53	657
30	31 March	Ross County	A	1–0	McBain 39	5,876
31	3 April	Livingston	A	1–4	Wyness 78	2,136
32	7 April	Greenock Morton	A	3–0	Christie 17 Wyness 77 MacDonald 88	931
33	14 April	Ayr United	H	1–0	Mann 81	2,269
34	21 April	Airdrieonians	A	1–1	Wyness 71	805
35	28 April	Livingston	H	2-3	Sheerin (pen) 17, (pen) 90	2,824
36	5 May	Falkirk	A	1–2	Wyness 71	2,230

==== Final League table ====
Pos	Team	Pld	W	D	L	GF	GA	GD	Pts
2	Ayr United	36	19	12	5	73	41	+32	69
3	Falkirk	36	16	8	12	57	59	−2	56
4	Inverness CT	36	14	12	10	71	54	+17	54
5	Clyde	36	11	14	11	44	46	−2	47
6	Ross County	36	11	10	15	48	52	−4	43

Source: "2000-2001 First Division - SPFL Archive". SPFL.
Rules for classification: 1) points; 2) goal difference; 3) number of goals scored.

=== Scottish League Cup ===
Round	Date	Opponent	H/A	Score	ICT Scorer(s)	Attendance
R1	8 August	Peterhead	A	3–2	Stewart 16 Xausa 43 Mann 77	1,001
R2	22 August	Airdrieonians	H	0-2		867

=== Scottish Challenge Cup ===
Round	Date	Opponent	H/A	Score	ICT Scorer(s)	Attendance
R1	15 August	Alloa Athletic	A	3–2	Stewart 53, 82 Bavidge 85	597
R2	2 September	Stranraer	H	1–2	Bavidge 57	664

=== Scottish Cup ===
Round	Date	Opponent	H/A	Score	ICT Scorer(s)	Attendance
R3	27 January	Ayr United	A	4–3	Sheerin 54 Mann 60 Xausa 68 Wyness 72	2,258
R4	17 February	Kilmarnock	H	1–1	Robson 89	5,294
R4 R	6 March	Kilmarnock	A	1–2	Xausa 51	6,528

== Hat-tricks ==
Player	Competition	Score	Opponent	Date
(Scotland) Dennis Wyness	Scottish First Division	7–3	Ayr United	2 December 2000
(Scotland) Dennis Wyness	Scottish First Division	4–2	Morton	13 March 2001
