= 2004–05 Inverness Caledonian Thistle F.C. season =

Scottish football club season

Inverness Caledonian Thistle F.C.
2004–05 season
- Manager: John Robertson (to November); Craig Brewster (from November)
- Scottish Premier League: 8th
- Scottish Cup: Fourth round
- Scottish League Cup: Third round
- Top goalscorer: League: Barry Wilson (9); All: Barry Wilson (9))
- Highest home attendance: 9,530 vs. Aberdeen, 16 October 2004 (Pittodrie Stadium); 6,092 vs. Celtic, 16 March 2005 (Caledonian Stadium)
- Lowest home attendance: 1,125 vs. Dundee United, 23 November 2004 (Pittodrie Stadium); 1,464 vs. Motherwell, 22 September 2004 (Caledonian Stadium)

Inverness Caledonian Thistle F.C. in their 11th season in Scottish football competed in the Scottish Premier League, Scottish League Cup and the Scottish Cup in season 2004–05.

== Results ==
=== Scottish Premier League ===
Match Day	Date	Opponent	H/A	Score	ICT Scorer(s)	Attendance
1	7 August	Livingston	A	0–3		3,310
2	15 August	Dunfermline Athletic	H	2–0	Golabek, Carricondo	1,972
3	22 August	Celtic	H	1–3	Wilson	8,736
4	28 August	Dundee United	A	1–2	Wilson	6,017
5	11 September	Hibernian	H	1–2	Wilson	2,011
6	19 September	Rangers	A	0–1		47,063
7	25 September	Heart of Midlothian	A	0–1		10,340
8	3 October	Motherwell	H	1–1	McCaffrey	1,438
9	16 October	Aberdeen	H	1–3	McBain	9,530
10	23 October	Kilmarnock	A	2–2	Wilson, Fox	4,721
11	27 October	Dundee	H	2–1	Bayne (2)	1,254
12	30 October	Livingston	H	2–0	Bayne, Wilson	1,279
13	6 November	Dunfermline Athletic	A	1–1	Fox	4,921
14	13 November	Celtic	A	0–3		56,594
15	23 November	Dundee United	H	1–1	Carricondo	1,125
16	27 November	Hibernian	A	1–2	Carricondo	9,728
17	5 December	Rangers	H	1–1	Bayne	6,543
18	11 December	Heart of Midlothian	H	1–1	Carricondo	2,011
19	18 December	Motherwell	A	2–1	Hart, Bayne	4,267
20	27 December	Aberdeen	A	0–0		18,250
21	3 January	Kilmarnock	H	0–2		1,346
22	15 January	Dundee	A	1–3	Brewster	5,567
23	22 January	Livingston	A	4–1	Hart, Duncan, Bayne, Carricondo	4,106
24	29 January	Dunfermline Athletic	H	2–0	Wilson, Brewster	5,449
25	19 February	Dundee United	A	1–1	Wilson	6,110
26	2 March	Hibernian	H	3–0	Carricondo, Brewster, Wilson,	4,443
27	5 March	Rangers	A	1–1	Prunty	49,345
28	12 March	Heart of Midlothian	A	2–0	Dods, Wilson	9,822
29	16 March	Celtic	H	0–2		7,045
30	2 April	Aberdeen	H	0–1		7,026
31	9 April	Kilmarnock	A	1–0	Wilson	4,862
32	12 April	Motherwell	H	1–0	Bayne	3,746
33	16 April	Dundee	H	3–2	McBain, Prunty, Brewster	4.786
34	23 April	Dunfermline Athletic	A	0–0		4,481
35	30 April	Kilmarnock	H	1–2	Tokely	3,108
36	7 May	Livingston	H	0–1		3,021
37	14 May	Dundee	A	1–1	Fox	6,691
38	21 May	Dundee United	H	0–1		5,479

==== Final League table ====
Pos	Team	Pld	W	D	L	GF	GA	GD	Pts	Qualification or relegation (Note: Teams played each other three times (33 matches), before the league split into two groups (the top six and the bottom six) for the last five matches.)
6	Motherwell	38	13	9	16	46	49	−3	48	
7	Kilmarnock	38	15	4	19	49	55	−6	49	
8	Inverness Caledonian Thistle	38	11	11	16	41	47	−6	44	
9	Dundee United	38	8	12	18	41	59	−18	36	Qualification for the UEFA Cup second qualifying round (Note: As Celtic, the 2004–05 Scottish Cup winners, qualified for the UEFA Champions League via their league position, the place in the UEFA Cup was passed onto Dundee United, the cup runners-up.)
10	Livingston	38	9	8	21	34	61	−27	35	

Source: Scottish Professional Football League
Rules for classification: 1) Points; 2) Goal difference; 3) Goals scored

=== Scottish League Cup ===
Round	Date	Opponent	H/A	Score	ICT Scorer(s)	Attendance
R2	24 August	Ross County	A	1–0	Tokely	3,315
R3	22 September	Motherwell	H	1–3	Tokely	1,464

=== Scottish Cup ===
Round	Date	Opponent	H/A	Score	ICT Scorer(s)	Attendance
R3	8 January	St Johnstone	H	1–0	Golabek	2,021
R4	5 February	Aberdeen	A	1–2	Brewster	10,595
