= 2005–06 Inverness Caledonian Thistle F.C. season =

Scottish football club season

Inverness Caledonian Thistle F.C.
2005–06 season
- Manager: Craig Brewster (to January); Charlie Christie (from January)
- Scottish Premier League: 7th
- Scottish Cup: 4th Round
- Scottish League Cup: 4th Round
- Top goalscorer: League: Craig Dargo (17); All: Craig Dargo (20)
- Highest home attendance: 7,512 vs. Rangers, 6 August 2005
- Lowest home attendance: 917 vs. Alloa Athletic, 24 August 2005

Inverness Caledonian Thistle F.C. in their 12th season in Scottish football competing in the Scottish Premier League, Scottish League Cup and the Scottish Cup in season 2005–06.

== Results ==
=== Scottish Premier League ===
| Match Day | Date | Opponent | H/A | Score | ICT Scorer(s) | Attendance |
|---|---|---|---|---|---|---|
| 1 | 30 July | Falkirk | A | 2–0 | Brewster (2) | 4,561 |
| 2 | 6 August | Rangers | H | 0–1 | | 7,512 |
| 3 | 13 August | Dunfermline Athletic | A | 1–0 | Fox | 5,005 |
| 4 | 20 August | Kilmarnock | H | 2–2 | Brewster (2) | 4,119 |
| 5 | 28 August | Dundee United | A | 1–1 | Brewster | 6,718 |
| 6 | 10 September | Motherwell | H | 1–2 | Brewster | 4,018 |
| 7 | 17 September | Heart of Midlothian | H | 0–1 | | 6,704 |
| 8 | 24 September | Celtic | A | 1–2 | Wyness | 57,247 |
| 9 | 2 October | Hibernian | A | 2–1 | Proctor, Wyness | 11,683 |
| 10 | 15 October | Aberdeen | H | 1–1 | Bayne | 6,809 |
| 11 | 22 October | Livingston | A | 1–1 | Morgan | 3,372 |
| 12 | 26 October | Falkirk | H | 0–3 | | 3,660 |
| 13 | 29 October | Rangers | A | 1–1 | Dargo | 47,867 |
| 14 | 5 November | Dunfermline Athletic | H | 2–1 | Black, Proctor | 3,728 |
| 15 | 19 November | Kilmarnock | A | 2–2 | Bayne, Dargo | 4,708 |
| 16 | 26 November | Dundee United | H | 1–1 | Tokely | 3,239 |
| 17 | 3 December | Motherwell | A | 2–0 | Dargo (2) | 4,103 |
| 18 | 10 December | Heart of Midlothian | A | 0–0 | | 16,373 |
| 19 | 18 December | Celtic | H | 1–1 | Dargo | 7,382 |
| 20 | 26 December | Hibernian | H | 2–0 | Dargo (2) | 7,017 |
| 21 | 31 December | Aberdeen | A | 0–0 | | 12,266 |
| 22 | 14 January | Livingston | H | 3–0 | Dargo (2), Wyness | 3,604 |
| 23 | 21 January | Falkirk | A | 4–1 | Wilson, Wyness, Dargo, Tokely | 4,772 |
| 24 | 29 January | Rangers | H | 2–3 | Dargo, Wyness | 7,380 |
| 25 | 8 February | Dunfermline Athletic | A | 2–2 | Dargo, Wyness | 3,355 |
| 26 | 11 February | Kilmarnock | H | 3–3 | Wyness, Dargo, Proctor | 3,618 |
| 27 | 18 February | Dundee United | A | 4–2 | Dods, Wyness, Dargo, Morgan | 6,419 |
| 28 | 4 March | Motherwell | H | 0–1 | | 3,183 |
| 29 | 11 March | Heart of Midlothian | H | 0–0 | | 5,027 |
| 30 | 22 March | Celtic | A | 1–2 | Hart | 57,541 |
| 31 | 25 March | Hibernian | A | 2–0 | Dods, Wilson | 12,745 |
| 32 | 1 April | Aberdeen | H | 0–1 | | 7,368 |
| 33 | 8 April | Livingston | A | 1–2 | Tokely | 2,688 |
| 34 | 15 April | Motherwell | A | 1–0 | Dargo | 3,438 |
| 35 | 22 April | Dundee United | H | 1–0 | Dargo | 3,609 |
| 36 | 29 April | Livingston | A | 1–0 | Wilson | 2,278 |
| 37 | 3 May | Falkirk | H | 2–0 | Duncan, Dargo | 3,121 |
| 38 | 6 May | Dunfermline Athletic | A | 1–0 | Morgan | 5,354 |

==== Final League table ====
| Pos | Team | Pld | W | D | L | GF | GA | GD | Pts | Qualification or relegation (Note: Teams played each other three times (33 matches), before the league split into two groups (the top six and the bottom six) for the last five matches.) |
|---|---|---|---|---|---|---|---|---|---|---|
| 5 | Kilmarnock | 38 | 15 | 10 | 13 | 63 | 64 | −1 | 55 | |
| 6 | Aberdeen | 38 | 13 | 15 | 10 | 46 | 40 | +6 | 54 | |
| 7 | Inverness Caledonian Thistle | 38 | 15 | 13 | 10 | 51 | 38 | +13 | 58 | |
| 8 | Motherwell | 38 | 13 | 10 | 15 | 55 | 61 | −6 | 49 | |
| 9 | Dundee United | 38 | 7 | 12 | 19 | 41 | 66 | −25 | 33 | |

Source: Scottish Professional Football League
Rules for classification: 1) Points; 2) Goal difference; 3) Goals scored

=== Scottish League Cup ===
| Round | Date | Opponent | H/A | Score | ICT Scorer(s) | Attendance |
|---|---|---|---|---|---|---|
| R2 | 24 August | Alloa Athletic | H | 6–1 | Wilson, Hart, McBain, Duncan, Munro, Wyness | 917 |
| R3 | 20 September | Dundee United | H | 2–0 | Fox, Wilson | 1,919 |
| R4 | 8 November | Livingston | A | 1–3 | Dargo | 1,521 |

=== Scottish Cup ===
| Round | Date | Opponent | H/A | Score | ICT Scorer(s) | Attendance |
|---|---|---|---|---|---|---|
| R3 | 7 January | Ayr United | H | 1–1 | McAllister | 2,126 |
| R3 R | 16 January | Ayr United | A | 2–0 | Dargo, Wyness | 2,774 |
| R4 | 4 February | Partick Thistle | H | 2–2 | McBain, Dargo | 3,286 |
| R4 R | 15 February | Partick Thistle | A | 1–1 (aet, Partick Thistle won 4–2 on penalties) | Wyness | 3,166 |
