= North derby =

Football rivalry in Scotland

North Derby
- Teams: Aberdeen and Inverness Caledonian Thistle
- First meeting: Inverness CT 0–3 Aberdeen (8 August 1998)
- Latest meeting: Aberdeen 1–0 Inverness CT (4 April 2017)

Statistics
- Most wins: Aberdeen (24)
- Top scorer: (Northern Ireland) Billy Mckay Inverness CT, 6 goals
- Largest victory: Aberdeen 4–1 Inverness CT (31 October 2007)
- Smallest victory: 1–0, (12 times). Aberdeen x10 Inverness CT x2
- Largest goal scoring: Inverness CT 3–4 Aberdeen (29 March 2008) and (21 December 2013)
- Longest win streak: Aberdeen, 4 games. (21 October 2007 to 29 March 2008) and (27 September 2014 to 25 April 2015)
- Longest unbeaten streak: Aberdeen, 17 games. (8 August 1998 to 29 March 2008)
- Current win streak: Aberdeen, 2 games. (19 November 2016 to present)
- Current unbeaten streak: Aberdeen, 3 games. (10 September 2016 to present)
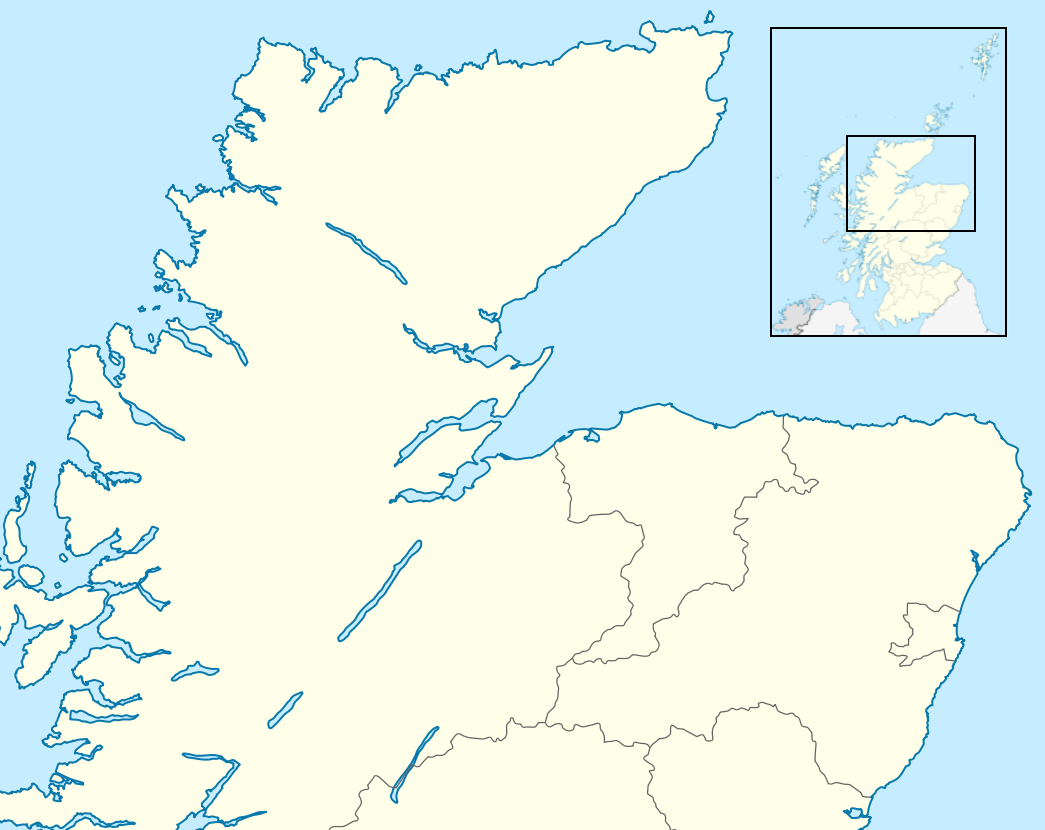

The term North derby is sometimes used to emphasise their relative geographical proximity, when matches are played between Scottish football clubs Aberdeen and Inverness Caledonian Thistle. The clubs first met in a Scottish League Cup tie played on 8 August 1998. Inverness first entered the Scottish Football League in 1994 alongside fellow Highland side Ross County, forming the Highland derby. However, Inverness progressed over the next 10 years to form a rivalry with Aberdeen, after winning promotion to the Scottish Premier League in 2004.

The match is considered to be a derby despite the fact that the two cities are over 100 miles apart. Aberdeen have no immediate rival geographically, although they have a longstanding rivalry with Rangers and another with Dundee United, who have frequently competed with them for Scottish major trophies.

Before Ross County were promoted to the SPL in 2012, the lack of an alternative derby opponent for both clubs led to the development of the rivalry. Due to the redevelopment of the Caledonian Stadium to meet SPL standard, Inverness had to share Pittodrie Stadium with Aberdeen during the first half of the 2004–05 league season.

Initially, the match has also been given an edge by Aberdeen enjoying a long unbeaten record against Inverness, partly thanks to a remarkable number of very late goals. This record was finally ended on the opening day of the 2008–09 league season when Inverness won 2–0 at Pittodrie. Other notable matches between the two clubs include a Scottish Cup tie in 2000. Aberdeen beat Inverness after a replay in the round after Inverness had caused a great shock by beating Celtic.

The clubs met on 16 March 2014 in their most high-profile game to date, the 2014 Scottish League Cup final, with Aberdeen winning on penalties after a 0–0 draw (aet).

== Matches played ==
Season	Date	Venue	Competition	Score	Home scorer(s)	Away scorer(s)	Attendance	Report
1998–99	08.08.1998	Caledonian Stadium	League Cup	0–3		Dodds (1, 66, 70)	5,164	Sunday Mirror
1999–00	20.02.2000	Caledonian Stadium	Scottish Cup	1–1	Mann (50)	Guntveit (81)	6,290	BBC Sport
1999–00	29.02.2000	Pittodrie	Scottish Cup	1–0	Stavrum (75)		18,451	Sporting Life
2004–05	16.10.2004	Pittodrie	SPL	1–3	McBain (36)	Adams (28, 64 pen.), Mackie (90 pen.)	9,530	BBC Sport
2004–05	27.12.2004	Pittodrie	SPL	0–0			18,250	BBC Sport
2004–05	05.02.2005	Pittodrie	Scottish Cup	2–1	Mackie (15, 34)	Brewster (24)	10,595	BBC Sport
2004–05	02.04.2005	Caledonian Stadium	SPL	0–1		Whelan (38)	7,026	BBC Sport
2005–06	15.10.2005	Caledonian Stadium	SPL	1–1	Bayne (73)	J. Smith (55)	6,809	BBC Sport
2005–06	31.12.2005	Pittodrie	SPL	0–0			12,266	BBC Sport
2005–06	01.04.2006	Caledonian Stadium	SPL	0–1		Lovell (83)	7,368	BBC Sport
2006–07	05.08.2006	Pittodrie	SPL	1–1	Crawford (29)	Wilson (89)	11,955	BBC Sport
2006–07	06.11.2006	Caledonian Stadium	SPL	1–1	Bayne (78)	Lovell (90)	5,744	BBC Sport
2006–07	13.01.2007	Pittodrie	SPL	1–1	Lovell (90)	Rankin (86)	10,300	BBC Sport
2007–08	21.10.2007	Caledonian Stadium	SPL	1–2	Wyness (58)	Young (8), Tokely (68 o.g.)	6,023	BBC Sport
2007–08	31.10.2007	Pittodrie	League Cup	4–1	Nicholson (10 pen., 21 pen., 78), Miller (45)	Bayne (68)	7,270	BBC Sport
2007–08	02.01.2008	Pittodrie	SPL	1–0	Nicholson (83 pen.)		13,372	BBC Sport
2007–08	29.03.2008	Caledonian Stadium	SPL	3–4	Bus (21 o.g.), Duncan (40), McBain (57)	Aluko (7), Nicholson (45), Miller (53), Maguire (90)	5,655	BBC Sport
2008–09	29.08.2008	Pittodrie	SPL	0–2		Barrowman (27), McBain (90)	12,659	BBC Sport
2008–09	20.12.2008	Caledonian Stadium	SPL	0–3		Mulgrew (6), McDonald (51), Mackie (56)	5,862	BBC Sport
2008–09	11.04.2009	Pittodrie	SPL	1–0	McDonald (79)		11,114	BBC Sport
2010–11	02.10.2010	Caledonian Stadium	SPL	2–0	Hayes (19), Rooney (61)		6,144	BBC Sport
2010–11	09.11.2010	Pittodrie	SPL	1–2	Velicka (49)	Rooney (34 pen.), Munro (81)	5,917	BBC Sport
2010–11	26.01.2011	Caledonian Stadium	SPL	0–2		Jack (44), Blackman (49)	4,468	BBC Sport
2010–11	30.04.2011	Pittodrie	SPL	1–0	Pawlett (75)		6,280	BBC Sport
2011–12	20.08.2011	Pittodrie	SPL	2–1	Milsom (12), Vernon (27)	Foran (79)	7,989	BBC Sport
2011–12	24.12.2011	Caledonian Stadium	SPL	2–1	Golobart (64), Tade (69)	Fallon (76)	5,888	BBC Sport
2011–12	24.03.2012	Pittodrie	SPL	0–1		Tade (10)	8,939	BBC Sport
2011–12	21.04.2012	Caledonian Stadium	SPL	0–2		Golobart (46 o.g.), Gillet (89 o.g.)	3,487	BBC Sport
2012–13	15.09.2012	Caledonian Stadium	SPL	1–1	Foran (67 pen.)	Smith (84)	4,499	BBC Report
2012–13	27.11.2012	Pittodrie	SPL	2–3	Magennis (45, 50)	McKay (36, 82), Warren (58)	9,193	BBC Report
2012–13	19.01.2013	Caledonian Stadium	SPL	3–0	Shinnie (53), McKay (61, 78)		4,734	BBC Report
2013–14	21.09.2013	Pittodrie	Premiership	1–0	Vernon (81)		11,251	BBC Report
2013–14	21.12.2013	Caledonian Stadium	Premiership	3–4	McKay (47, 57), Shinnie (90)	Robson (22 pen., 32), Pawlett (37), McGinn (44)	4,810	BBC Report
2013–14	18.01.2014	Pittodrie	Premiership	0–1		Williams (22)	12,021	BBC Report
2013–14	16.03.2014	Celtic Park	League Cup	0–0 (Note: After Extra Time; Aberdeen won 4–2 on penalties.)			51,143	BBC Report
2013–14	18.04.2014	Caledonian Stadium	Premiership	0–0			4,224	BBC Report
2014–15	27.09.2014	Pittodrie	Premiership	3–2	Rooney (24), Logan (40), Hayes (59)	Meekings (16), Watkins (50)	11,414	BBC Report
2014–15	28.12.2014	Caledonian Stadium	Premiership	0–1		Pawlett (12)	6,614	BBC Report
2014–15	08.04.2015	Pittodrie	Premiership	1–0	Taylor (47)		11,319	BBC Report
2014–15	25.04.2015	Caledonian Stadium	Premiership	1–2	Ofere (48)	Raven (69 o.g.), McGinn (74)	4,530	BBC Report
2015–16	26.09.2015	Caledonian Stadium	Premiership	2–1	Storey (8), Christie (29)	Taylor (35)	6,410	BBC Report
2015–16	26.12.2015	Pittodrie	Premiership	2–2	Polworth (41), Tansey (47 pen.)	McGinn (73), Rooney (90 pen.)	15,142	BBC Report
2015–16	15.02.2016	Caledonian Stadium	Premiership	3–1	Vigurs (18), Tansey (51 pen.), Tremarco (65)	Rooney (7)	4,544	BBC Report
2016–17	10.09.2016	Pittodrie	Premiership	1–1	McGinn (51)	Vigurs (68)	11,356	BBC Report
2016–17	19.11.2016	Caledonian Stadium	Premiership	1–3	Doumbouya (15)	McLean (28, 89), Rooney (33 pen.)	4,867	BBC report
2016–17	04.04.2017	Pittodrie	Premiership	1–0	Warren (22 o.g.)		11,507	BBC report

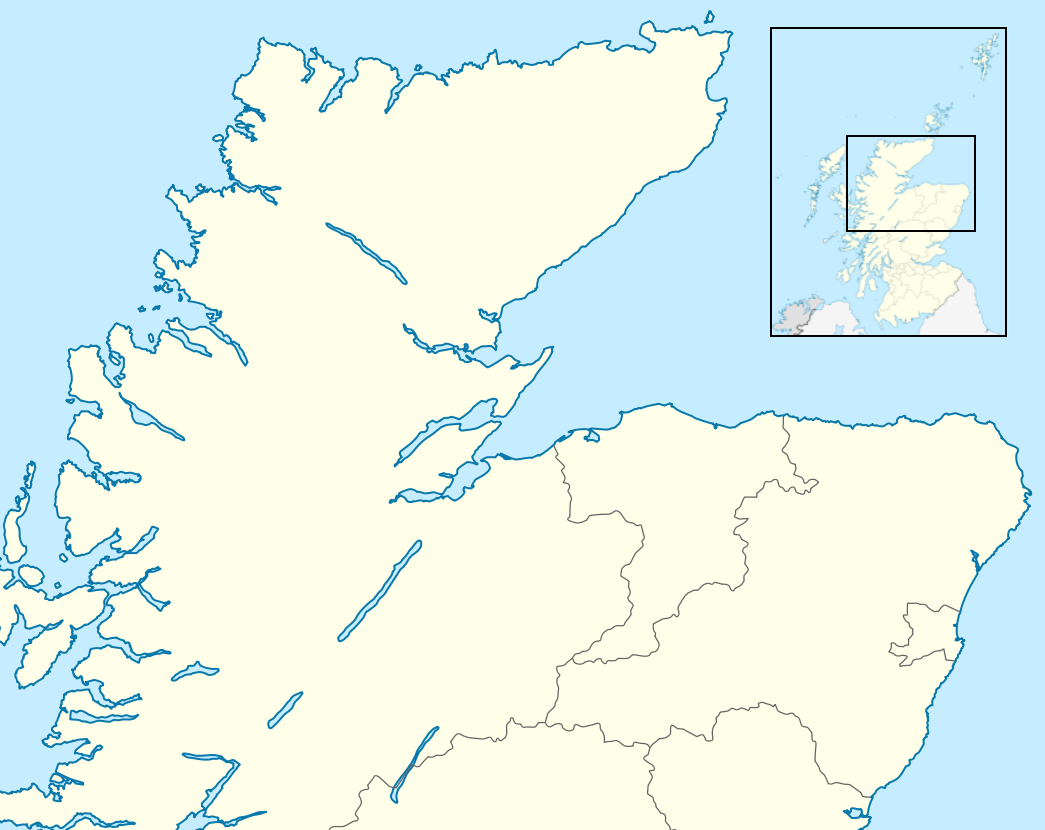
Locations of teams in the derby

== Head-to-head summary ==
As of 4 April 2017

Competition	Aberdeen wins	Draws	Inverness CT wins	Aberdeen goals	Inverness CT goals
SPL / Premiership	20	10	10	53	42
Scottish Cup	2	1	0	4	2
League Cup	2	1	0	7	1
Overall	24	12	10	64	45

== Goalscorer records ==
Players with 3 or more goals in the North derby.

As of 4 April 2017

Scorer	Team(s)	League	Scottish Cup	League Cup	Total
(Northern Ireland) Billy McKay	Inverness Caledonian Thistle	6	–	–	6
(Republic of Ireland) Adam Rooney	Aberdeen; Inverness Caledonian Thistle	4; 2	– –	– –	6
(Scotland) Barry Nicholson	Aberdeen	2	–	3	5
(Northern Ireland) Niall McGinn	Aberdeen	4	–	–	4
(Scotland) Darren Mackie	Aberdeen	2	2	–	4
(England) Steve Lovell	Aberdeen	3	–	–	3
(Scotland) Roy McBain	Inverness Caledonian Thistle	3	–	–	3
(Scotland) Peter Pawlett	Aberdeen	3	–	–	3
(Scotland) Graham Bayne	Inverness Caledonian Thistle	2	–	1	3
(Scotland) Billy Dodds	Aberdeen	-	–	3	3
