= North East derby =

The North East derby is a football fixture which can relate to the following:

- Tees–Wear derby between Middlesbrough F.C. and Sunderland A.F.C. in England
- Tyne–Tees derby between Newcastle United and Middlesbrough F.C. in England
- Tyne–Wear derby between Newcastle United and Sunderland A.F.C. in England
- North derby between Aberdeen F.C. and Inverness Caledonian Thistle in Scotland
