= Stuart McCaffrey =

Scottish footballer

Personal information
- Full name: Stuart Muir McCaffrey
- Date of birth: 30 May 1979 (age 47)
- Place of birth: Glasgow, Scotland
- Position: Defender

Senior career*
Years	Team	Apps	(Gls)
1996–1998	Hibernian	2	(0)
1998–2001	Aberdeen	0	(0)
2000	→ Inverness Caledonian Thistle (loan)	11	(0)
2001	→ Inverness Caledonian Thistle (loan)	20	(0)
2001–2008	Inverness Caledonian Thistle	132	(6)
2008	→ St Johnstone (loan)	1	(1)
2008–2010	St Johnstone	36	(3)
2010–2012	Greenock Morton	40	(0)
Total		242	(10)
- * Club domestic league appearances and goals

Stuart McCaffrey (born 30 May 1979) is a Scottish former professional footballer who played as a defender.

== Playing career ==
McCaffrey began his career as a trainee with Hibernian, before signing for Aberdeen in July 1998. Failing to break into the Aberdeen first team, he signed on loan for Inverness Caledonian Thistle in September 2000. This was followed by a permanent contract.

McCaffrey made more than 150 appearances for Inverness, and has scored five goals. He was part of the Inverness defence, playing alongside the likes of Bobby Mann, Stuart Golabek, Ross Tokely, Grant Munro and Darren Dods. McCaffrey joined St Johnstone on a six-month loan on 31 December 2007, and made the move permanent in April 2008.

McCaffrey has Scottish Challenge Cup and Scottish Football League First Division winner's medals, both won whilst playing for Inverness. He has become a regular in the heart of the St Johnstone defence, and has also scored a few goals. Unfortunately, he also scored an own goal in a Scottish Cup tie against Rangers, when he diverted a cross ball past Alan Main.

After being restricted to 12 appearances for Saints during the 2009–10 season due to injuries, McCaffrey signed for Greenock Morton on a free transfer in July 2010.

Following a tear of his Plantar fascia mid-season, in May he announced that he would be taking a break from football but had not yet planned to retire.

== Coaching career ==
McCaffrey was working towards his B licence.

== Personal life ==
McCaffrey is married. His wife Rachel (who is a teacher at Loudoun Academy) gave birth to their daughter Martha on 4 September 2011.
