= Les Fridge =

Scottish footballer

Personal information
- Full name: Leslie Francis Fridge
- Date of birth: 27 August 1968 (age 58)
- Place of birth: Inverness, Scotland
- Height: 5 ft 11 in (1.80 m)
- Position: Goalkeeper

Senior career*
Years	Team	Apps	(Gls)
1985	Inverness Thistle	1	(0)
1985–1987	Chelsea	1	(0)
1987–1993	St Mirren	70	(0)
1987	→ Stirling Albion (loan)	1	(0)
1988	→ Arbroath (loan)	3	(0)
1993–1995	Clyde	68	(0)
1995–1996	Raith Rovers	1	(0)
1996–1997	Dundalk	35	(0)
1997–2002	Inverness Caledonian Thistle	63	(0)
2002–2003	Ross County	2	(0)
Total		245	(0)

International career
1989	Scotland U21	2	(0)

Managerial career
- 2004–2016: Nairn County
- * Club domestic league appearances and goals

Leslie Francis Fridge (born 27 August 1968) is a Scottish former football goalkeeper. He was formerly manager at Nairn County.

== Career ==
A product of the Scottish Highland Football League, Fridge began his senior career with his home town club, Inverness Thistle of the Scottish Highland Football League, and as a 16-year-old played for Inverness Thistle, in goal, in the 1984-85 Scottish Cup against Celtic in a Fourth Round tie at Celtic Park in a 6–0 defeat.

He transferred early in his senior career, to Chelsea in April 1985. He played regularly for the Juniors in 1985–86. A goalkeeper with a good physique, he made his first-team debut for Chelsea in the last game of the 1985–86 season at home to Watford. Chelsea lost 5–1. This game was his first and his last game for Chelsea.

He returned to Scotland and spent six years with St Mirren, including loans to Stirling Albion and Arbroath before having spells with Clyde and Raith Rovers. This was followed by a season playing for Dundalk in Ireland.

After much travelling Fridge soon returned home to sign for Inverness Caledonian Thistle. He spent four years with Caley but struggled to be regular choice at the Caledonian Stadium with the likes of Jim Calder and Nicky Walker to contend with. In 2002, he signed for near neighbours Ross County.

Fridge retired in 2003, and in 2004 became manager of nearby Nairn County of the Highland Football League. After twelve years and 477 games as manager, he left the club in 2016. He was also briefly a coach for Caley Thistle's youth teams.
