= Davide Xausa =

Canadian former soccer player (born 1976)

Personal information
- Full name: Davide Antonio Xausa
- Date of birth: 10 March 1976 (age 50)
- Place of birth: Vancouver, British Columbia, Canada
- Position: Forward

Youth career
- 1994–1997: University of Portland

Senior career*
Years	Team	Apps	(Gls)
1996–1997	St. Catharines Wolves		
1998	Stoke City	1	(0)
1997–1998	St Johnstone	1	(0)
1998–1999	Dordrecht '90	12	(2)
1999–2001	Inverness Caledonian Thistle	41	(17)
2001–2003	Livingston	68	(15)
2004	Falkirk	13	(0)
2004–2005	Vancouver Whitecaps	26	(6)
2008–2012	Vancouver Columbus		
Total		162	(40)

International career
1999–2003	Canada	32	(2)
Medal record
Representing Canada
Men's soccer
CONCACAF Gold Cup
Winner	2000 United States
Third place	2002 United States
- * Club domestic league appearances and goals

Davide Antonio Xausa (born 10 March 1976) is a Canadian former soccer player.

== Club career ==
Xausa started his career with Metro Ford Wolves before accepting a scholarship with the University of Portland where he was a 3 time All American, four-time WCC 1st team pick and three-time All Far West Region 1st team. After spending three years at the University of Portland, Xausa was chosen to be part of the 1996 Canadian Olympic team. During that qualification Xausa led the Canadian team to final playoff against Australia for a qualification spot. The attempt was unsuccessful but as a result of his play he relocated to Stoke-on-Trent, England in January 1998 to play for Port Vale on trial. Unable to secure a contract he was asked to join their rivals Stoke City the following month. Xausa signed a six-month contract and but he only played once, away at Bury in 1997–98, as then manager Chris Kamara, was sacked for a poor run of form. Xausa's contract expired and he was offered a two-year contract, moving north to Scotland to sign with St Johnstone. Due to injuries and lack of first team action, Xausa made a move the Netherlands to sign with Eerste Divisie side Dordrecht '90. Xausa was part of the successful division playoff with Dordrecht and enjoyed a fruitful spell with the club.

Xausa was offered a return to the United Kingdom in late 1999 and settled in Scotland with Inverness Caledonian Thistle. He played over sixty games for the club, maintaining a respectable goals tally before he was sold to first division rivals Livingston in March 2001, after he turned down the chance of a trial with Aberdeen. He was cup-tied for Livi's appearance in the semi-finals of the 2000–01 Scottish Cup. Staying with Livingston for two years he made 68 league appearances. During that time the club enjoyed the most successful spell with the team finishing third in the SPL and Xausa starting over 20 games. He struck a formidable partnership with a Spaniard, David Fernandez, and the two became a dangerous combination. Xausa was also part of the UEFA Cup qualification and scored in the homeleg of the second round against Austrian powerhouse Sturm Graz. After another management shift at Livingston in August 2003 he joined Falkirk. He scored his first and what turned out to be only goal for Falkirk in the Scottish Cup against Ayr United but left the club of his own accord in February 2004 to return to his native Canada to play for the Vancouver Whitecaps.

== International career ==
Xausa earned his first cap for Canada on 27 April 1999 against Northern Ireland. In all he played 32 full international games and scored 2 goals – one against Guatemala in a friendly on 29 May 1999 and the other one in the Open Canada Cup against Ecuador on 6 June 1999, which Canada lost 2–1.

In 2000, he was part of Canada's squad that won their first CONCACAF Gold Cup alongside fellow Inverness Caledonian Thistle team-mate, Richard Hastings. He played two games in the 2001 FIFA Confederations Cup. His last national team game was on 18 January 2003 against the United States.

== Post-playing career ==
Following his retirement from playing football, Xausa became CEO and President of Velofix Holdings Ltd in North America.

== Career statistics ==
=== Club ===
Club	Season	League			FA Cup		League Cup		Other^{[A]}		Total	
Club	Season	Division	Apps	Goals	Apps	Goals	Apps	Goals	Apps	Goals	Apps	Goals
Stoke City	1997–98	First Division	1	0	0	0	0	0	0	0	1	0
St Johnstone	1997–98	Scottish Premier Division	1	0	0	0	0	0	0	0	1	0
Dordrecht '90	1998–99	Eerste Divisie	12	2	0	0	0	0	0	0	12	2
Inverness Caledonian Thistle	1999–2000	Scottish First Division	19	11	1	0	1	0	0	0	21	11
Inverness Caledonian Thistle	2000–01	Scottish First Division	21	7	3	2	2	1	0	0	26	10
Livingston	2000–01	Scottish First Division	9	4	0	0	0	0	0	0	9	4
Livingston	2001–02	Scottish Premier League	28	7	0	0	2	0	0	0	30	7
Livingston	2002–03	Scottish Premier League	30	4	1	0	2	0	2	1	35	5
Livingston	2003–04	Scottish Premier League	1	0	0	0	0	0	0	0	1	0
Falkirk	2003–04	Scottish First Division	13	0	2	1	1	0	0	0	16	1
Vancouver Whitecaps	2004	USL A-League	25	6	0	0	0	0	0	0	25	6
Vancouver Whitecaps	2005	USL First Division	3	0	0	0	0	0	0	0	3	0
Career total			163	41	7	3	8	1	2	1	180	46

A. The "Other" column constitutes appearances and goals in the UEFA cup.

=== International ===
National team	Year	Apps	Goals
Canada
Canada	1999	7	2
Canada	2000	14	0
Canada	2001	5	0
Canada	2002	5	0
Canada	2003	1	0
Total		32	2

== Honours ==
Livingston

- Scottish First Division: 2000–01

Canada

- CONCACAF Gold Cup: 2000; 3rd place, 2002
