= 2003–04 Scottish First Division =

Scottish First Division
- Season: 2003–04
- Champions: Inverness Caledonian Thistle
- Promoted: Inverness Caledonian Thistle
- Relegated: Ayr United; Brechin City
- Top goalscorer: Ian Harty (15)

The 2003–04 Scottish Football League First Division was won by Inverness Caledonian Thistle who were promoted to the Scottish Premier League. Ayr United and Brechin City were relegated to the Second Division.

== League table ==
Pos	Team	Pld	W	D	L	GF	GA	GD	Pts	Promotion or relegation
1	Inverness CT (C, P)	36	21	7	8	67	33	+34	70	Promotion to the Premier League
2	Clyde	36	20	9	7	64	40	+24	69	
3	St Johnstone	36	15	12	9	59	45	+14	57	
4	Falkirk	36	15	10	11	43	37	+6	55	
5	Queen of the South	36	15	9	12	46	48	−2	54	
6	Ross County	36	12	13	11	49	41	+8	49	
7	St Mirren	36	9	14	13	39	46	−7	41	
8	Raith Rovers	36	8	10	18	37	57	−20	34	
9	Ayr United (R)	36	6	13	17	37	58	−21	31	Relegation to the Second Division
10	Brechin City (R)	36	6	9	21	37	73	−36	27	Relegation to the Second Division

Source: "2003-2004 First Division - SPFL Archive". SPFL.
Rules for classification: 1) points; 2) goal difference; 3) number of goals scored.
(C) Champions; (P) Promoted; (R) Relegated

== Top scorers ==
Player	Club	Goals
(Scotland) Ian Harty	Clyde	15
(Scotland) Paul Ritchie	Inverness CT	14
(Scotland) David Bingham	Inverness CT	13
(Scotland) Alex Burke	Queen of the South	13
(England) John Sutton	Raith Rovers	13
(Scotland) Pat Keogh	Clyde	12
(England) Sean O'Connor	Queen of the South	12
(Scotland) Barry Wilson	Inverness CT	11
(Finland) Mixu Paatelainen	St Johnstone	11
(Scotland) Andy Smith	Clyde	10
(Scotland) David Winters	Ross County	10

== Attendances ==
The average attendances for Scottish First Division clubs for season 2003/04 are shown below:

Club	Average
Inverness CT	3,203
St Mirren	2,784
St Johnstone	2,634
Falkirk	2,631
Ross County	2,375
Queen of the South	2,360
Raith Rovers	2,191
Ayr United	1,706
Clyde	1,672
Brechin City	813
