= Mark McCulloch =

Scottish footballer

Personal information
- Date of birth: 19 May 1975 (age 51)
- Place of birth: Inverness, Scotland
- Position: Defender

Senior career*
| Years | Team | Apps | (Gls) |
| 1993–1994 | Clachnacuddin | 0 | (0) |
| 1994–1997 | Dunfermline Athletic | 16 | (0) |
| 1997–2000 | Inverness Caledonian Thistle | 100 | (8) |
| 2000–2001 | Livingston | 35 | (5) |
| 2001–2002 | Partick Thistle | 14 | (1) |
| 2002–2009 | Ross County | 226 | (4) |
| 2009–2014 | Forfar | 149 | (1) |
| 2016-2017 | Rosyth | | |
- * Club domestic league appearances and goals

Mark McCulloch (born 19 May 1975) is a Scottish retired professional footballer, who played for Dunfermline Athletic, Inverness Caledonian Thistle, Livingston, Partick Thistle, Ross County and Forfar Athletic. McCulloch mainly played as a full-back, but was also used as a midfielder.

== Career ==
McCulloch started his career with Highland Football League side Clachnacuddin before moving to Dunfermline Athletic in 1994. After 3 seasons with the Pars, he returned to the Highlands and signed for his home-town team Inverness Caledonian Thistle. McCulloch captained the Inverness side that won a famous cup tie against Celtic, 3–1 at Celtic Park in February 2000. He was one of three Caley Thistle players that joined Livingston in one season in 2001, the others being Barry Wilson and Davide Xausa.

McCulloch was part of the Livingston team that was promoted to the Scottish Premier League, although he left the club before they played in the top division. He was also part of the Partick Thistle side that won promotion to the SPL the following season, but again he was transferred out of the club before playing any matches in the top tier.

He joined Ross County in 2002 and served the club for seven seasons, before moving in 2009 to Forfar Athletic, where he was captain. He retired in the summer of 2014 after failing to recover from a knee injury suffered in a cup tie against Dundee in August 2013.

McCulloch came out of retirement in 2016 to Rosyth, but hung up his boots again in 2017.

== Honours ==
Ross County

- Scottish Challenge Cup: 2006–07
