= Jim Calder (footballer) =

Scottish footballer

Personal information
- Full name: James Evan Calder
- Date of birth: 29 July 1960 (age 66)
- Place of birth: Grantown on Spey, Scotland
- Positions: Goalkeeper; centre-forward

Senior career*
Years	Team	Apps	(Gls)
1977–1994	Inverness Thistle	0	(0)
1994–2002	Inverness Caledonian Thistle	167	(0)
2002–2005	Nairn County	51	(0)
2005–2006	Clachnacuddin	?	(?)
2006	Rothes	?	(?)
2006	Forres Mechanics	?	(?)
2006–2007	Inverurie Loco Works	?	(?)
2007	Peterhead	1	(0)
2007–?	Inverurie Loco Works	?	(?)
- * Club domestic league appearances and goals as of 19:30, 19 October 2008 (UTC)

Jim Calder (born 29 July 1960) is a Scottish retired professional footballer. Calder played as a striker until he received a knee ligament injury at the age of 26. He then played as a goalkeeper, a highly unusual change given the specialist nature of that position.

Best known for his time with Inverness Caledonian Thistle, where he played from the club's formation in 1994 until 2002. Calder had been inherited from the squad of Inverness Thistle, who had merged with local rivals Caledonian to form the new club. Calder's goalkeeping antics and spectacular saves made him a firm favourite with Caley fans. His best match was probably in 2000 when he turned out a man of the match performance in Caley Thistle's famous 3–1 Scottish Cup victory over Celtic. Two seasons later Jim left Caley Thistle after the club signed Mark Brown.

Jim then signed for Nairn County, playing 51 times for the club. After leaving County in 2005, he took up short-term contracts at several Highland League clubs, including Clach, Rothes and Forres Mechanics. As late as 2007 the 46-year-old Calder even made an appearance in the Scottish Football League for Peterhead. He has also returned to Caley Thistle to coach their youth teams.
