= Richard Hastings =

Canadian soccer player (born 1977)

Personal information
- Full name: Richard Corey Hastings
- Date of birth: 18 May 1977 (age 49)
- Place of birth: Prince George, British Columbia, Canada
- Height: 1.83 m (6 ft 0 in)
- Position: Left back

Senior career*
| Years | Team | Apps | (Gls) |
| 1993–1994 | Nairn County | 16 | (0) |
| 1994–2001 | Inverness Caledonian Thistle | 180 | (2) |
| 2001–2002 | Ross County | 28 | (0) |
| 2002–2003 | Grazer AK | 9 | (0) |
| 2003–2004 | MVV Maastricht | 17 | (1) |
| 2004–2009 | Inverness Caledonian Thistle | 133 | (1) |
| 2009–2010 | Hamilton Academical | 17 | (0) |
| 2012–2013 | Brora Rangers | 5 | (0) |
| Total | | 384 | (4) |

International career^{‡}
| 1998–2010 | Canada | 59 | (1) |

Managerial career
- 2021–2023: Inverurie Loco Works
- 2024: Rothes
Medal record
Representing Canada
Men's soccer
CONCACAF Gold Cup
| Winner | 2000 United States |
| Third place | 2002 United States |
- * Club domestic league appearances and goals as of 6 June 2013 ‡ National team caps and goals as of 29 May 2010

Richard Cory Hastings (born 18 May 1977) is a former Canadian soccer player and former manager of Highland League side Inverurie Loco Works.

He played for Inverness Caledonian Thistle, Ross County, Grazer AK, MVV Maastricht, Hamilton Academical and Brora Rangers.

Hastings played 59 times for the Canada national team. Hastings was a member of the Canada side which won the 2000 CONCACAF Gold Cup, and later represented his country at the 2001 Confederations Cup, the 2002 CONCACAF Gold Cup, 2005 CONCACAF Gold Cup, 2007 CONCACAF Gold Cup and the 2009 CONCACAF Gold Cup.

Richard's nephew, Gabriel, signed for Caley Thistle as a youth team player on 14 May 2018.

== Club career ==
Hastings was born in Prince George, British Columbia, Canada. Hastings spent his early years in Vancouver. When he was 7 years old, he and his English parents moved to Middlesbrough, England. He went to Millburn Academy in Inverness.

Hastings began his career as a teenager with Nairn County before signing for Inverness Caledonian Thistle, for whom he made 106 appearances as a defender. During this spell in Inverness, he was an important player for the team and became Caley Thistle's first full-time player. A constant member of the squad that won promotion to the Scottish First Division, Hastings was also part of the team that beat Celtic in the Scottish Cup in 2000.

In 2001, Richie Hastings joined Ross County, before spells at Grazer AK and Maastricht. In 2004, he returned to Caley Thistle. He was the only international-capped player at Inverness Caledonian Thistle after the departure of Marius Niculae. In his second spell at Caley Thistle, he scored twice: against Dunfermline in the league and Morton in the Scottish League Cup.

Hastings was released from his contract with Hamilton at the end of the 2009–10 season. On 11 February 2011, Hastings announced his retirement as a player. The announcement was not surprising, as the 33-year-old had been without a club since the end of the 2009–10 season.

In 2012, Hastings came out of retirement and signed for Highland League side Brora Rangers.

== International career ==
Hastings played at the 1997 FIFA World Youth Championship in Malaysia, alongside Paul Stalteri and Jason Bent.

He made his senior debut for Canada in a May 1998 friendly match against Macedonia and, up to 22 November 2009, has earned a total of 57 caps, scoring 1 goal. He has represented Canada in 10 FIFA World Cup qualification matches. Hastings' only international goal was the golden goal in Canada's 2–1 win over Mexico in the quarter-final of the 2000 CONCACAF Gold Cup, a tournament Canada went on to win. Hastings was named Rookie of the Tournament.

He was also in the squad for the 2007 CONCACAF Gold Cup, playing in a central-defence position and was also named in the "Team of the Tournament" line-up. He was also selected in the 2009 Canadian Gold Cup roster.

Hastings last appearance in the Canada jersey was in a friendly on 29 May 2010 against Venezuela; the game ended as a 1–1 away draw.

=== International goals ===
Scores and results list Canada's goal tally first.

| # | Date | Venue | Opponent | Score | Result | Competition |
|---|---|---|---|---|---|---|
| 1 | 20 February 2000 | Qualcomm Stadium, San Diego, United States | Mexico | 2–1 | 2–1 | 2000 CONCACAF Gold Cup |

== Managerial career ==
Hastings was named the manager for Inverurie Loco Works in the Highland Football League in 2021. He left Inverurie in January 2023. Following his departure from Inverurie, he was named the manager for Rothes in 2024. After an eight month spell with Rothes, he left the club.

== Honours ==
=== Player ===
Canada

- CONCACAF Gold Cup: 2000; 3rd place, 2002

Canada U-20

- CONCACAF U-20 Championship: 1996

=== Individual ===
- CONCACAF Gold Cup All-Tournament team: 2007
