= Scott McLean (footballer, born 1976) =

Scottish footballer

Personal information
- Full name: Scott James McLean
- Date of birth: 17 June 1976 (age 50)
- Place of birth: East Kilbride, Scotland
- Position: Striker

Youth career
- 1992–1995: East Kilbride Thistle

Senior career*
Years	Team	Apps	(Gls)
1995–1996	St Johnstone	11	(0)
1996–1999	Inverness Caledonian Thistle	48	(32)
1999	→ Queen of the South (loan)	3	(0)
1999–2003	Partick Thistle	80	(38)
2003	St Mirren	3	(1)
2003–2005	Stirling Albion	49	(30)
2005–2006	Stranraer	3	(0)
Total		197	(101)
- * Club domestic league appearances and goals as of 2 May 2007

Scott James McLean (born 17 June 1976 in East Kilbride, South Lanarkshire) is a former Scottish professional footballer.

A striker, McLean began his career with St Johnstone in 1995. He remained at McDiarmid Park for just a year, making six league appearances. In 1996, he joined Inverness Caledonian Thistle. In three years with the Highland club he made 48 appearances, scoring 32 goals. After a loan period at Queen of the South in 1999, he joined Partick Thistle. He went on to make 80 league appearances for the Jags and scored 38 goals in the process.

In 2002, he signed for St Mirren, but remained with the club for just six months before moving to Stirling Albion. He scored 30 goals for Albion in 49 appearances. His most recent club, for the 2005-06 season, was Stranraer.

McLean won the Scottish Third Division, Second Division and First Division trophies and also scored in the four top leagues during his career and was named PFA Second Division Player of the Year in 2002 while with Partick Thistle. He later owned a building company.
