= Martin Glancy =

Scottish footballer

Personal information
- Full name: Martin Paul Glancy
- Date of birth: 24 March 1976 (age 50)
- Place of birth: Glasgow, Scotland
- Position: Forward

Senior career*
Years	Team	Apps	(Gls)
1995–1999	Dumbarton	64	(9)
1998–2001	Inverness Caledonian Thistle	31	(6)
2000–2001	Clydebank	21	(3)
2001–2002	Berwick Rangers	9	(1)
2001–2002	Queen of the South	3	(0)
2001–2002	Stranraer	6	(0)
2002–2004	Airdrie United	46	(5)
2002–2004	Stirling Albion	26	(3)
2005-2006	Bathgate Thistle		
- * Club domestic league appearances and goals

Martin Paul Glancy (born 24 March 1976) is a Scottish former footballer who played for Dumbarton, Inverness Caledonian Thistle, Clydebank, Berwick Rangers, Queen of the South, Stranraer, Airdrie United and Stirling Albion.
