= Stuart Golabek =

Scottish footballer

Personal information
- Full name: Stuart Golabek
- Date of birth: 5 November 1974 (age 51)
- Place of birth: Inverness, Scotland
- Position: Centre back

Senior career*
Years	Team	Apps	(Gls)
1994–1995	Clachnacuddin		
1995–1999	Ross County	85	(8)
1999–2007	Inverness Caledonian Thistle	185	(4)
2007	→ Livingston (loan)	10	(1)
2007–2009	Ross County	41	(2)
2009–2011	Inverness Caledonian Thistle	26	(0)
2011–2014	Brora Rangers	63	(3)
- * Club domestic league appearances and goals as of 00:46, 8 February 2013 (UTC)

Stuart Golabek (born 5 November 1974 in Inverness) is a Scottish retired professional footballer who last played for Highland League side Brora Rangers.

== Career ==
Golabek began his career with Highland League side Clachnacuddin, before moving to Ross County, where he played for nearly four years, before joining Inverness Caledonian Thistle in June 1999.

He quickly made a name for himself as a strong, hard-tackling defender and soon became an important member of the first team. In his first season with Inverness, Golabek was a member of the team that famously beat Celtic in the Scottish Cup on 8 February 2000. In the seasons that followed, Golabek continued to work hard in the Inverness defence, and when Bobby Mann left the club in the summer of 2004, Golabek was made team captain.

The highlights of Stuart Golabek's career include two wins against Celtic in the Scottish Cup, winning the Scottish Challenge Cup in 2003 and winning the First Division in 2004 and 2010, all with Caley.

By January 2007, he made only two league appearances in the 2006–07 season and was going to be transferred to Peterhead on loan until the end of the season. However, this fell through and he went to Livingston on loan instead.

On 30 May 2007, it was announced that Golabek had joined Ross County on a free transfer. He became new manager Dick Campbell's first signing.

Golabek returned to Inverness in 2009, signing a one-year contract. He signed a contract extension to play in the Scottish Premier League for the 2010–11 season.

=== Brora Rangers ===
On 22 May 2011, it was announced that Golabek was due to return to the Highland League by joining Brora Rangers. He retired from playing in 2014.
