= Roy McBain =

Scottish footballer and coach

Personal information
- Full name: Roy Adam McBain
- Date of birth: 7 November 1974 (age 51)
- Place of birth: Aberdeen, Scotland
- Position: Midfielder

Team information
- Current team: Banks o' Dee (co-manager)

Senior career*
Years	Team	Apps	(Gls)
1993–1994	Dundee United	1	(0)
1994–1996	Dundee	6	(0)
1996–2000	Ross County	121	(14)
2000–2011	Inverness Caledonian Thistle	285	(15)
2011	Brechin City (loan)	11	(0)
2011–2012	Peterhead	27	(2)
2012–2017	Cove Rangers	55	(10)
- * Club domestic league appearances and goals as of 01:35, 6 October 2020 (UTC)

Roy Adam McBain (born 7 November 1974) is a Scottish football player and coach who works at Turriff United in the Highland League as a player/assistant manager.

== Career ==
McBain began his career with Dundee United, making a single appearance early in the 1993–94 season. Released at the end of the season, McBain moved 'across the road' to First Division First Division neighbours Dundee, where he spent two seasons with the Dens Park side. In 1996, McBain moved to Third Division side Ross County, where he won promotion at the third attempt after finishing within a point of automatic promotion in his first two years at Dingwall. The title win in the 1998–99 season, saw McBain again narrowly miss out on promotion as Ross County finished two points outside of the promotion spots.

Nevertheless, McBain moved back to the First Division with Inverness Caledonian Thistle, tasting another championship and promotion in the 2003–04 season. A first-team regular with Inverness, McBain was given a new two-year contract in April 2005, and another in late 2006. In August 2010, Roy McBain played in his testimonial match. The game was between an Inverness select side and a legends team, which included Bobby Mann and Paul Sheerin. Inverness won the game 4–1. After a loan spell at Brechin City in 2011, McBain joined Peterhead in the same year.

McBain then signed for Cove Rangers in 2012. As of April 2019, McBain was working for Cove as a first team coach.

== Career statistics ==
Club	Season	League		Cup		League Cup		Other		Total	
Club	Season	Apps	Goals	Apps	Goals	Apps	Goals	Apps	Goals	Apps	Goals
Dundee United	1993–94	1	0	-	-	-	-	-	-	1	0
Dundee United	Total	1	0	0	0	0	0	0	0	1	0
Dundee	1995–96	6	0	N/A		N/A		N/A		6	0
Dundee	Total	6	0	0	0	0	0	0	0	6	0
Ross County	1996–97	27	4	N/A		N/A		N/A		27	4
Ross County	1997–98	33	4	5	0	2	0	-	-	40	4
Ross County	1998–99	33	5	3	1	4	1	-	-	40	7
Ross County	1999–00	28	1	2	0	2	0	3	0	35	1
Ross County	Total	121	14	10	1	8	1	3	0	142	16
Inverness Caledonian Thistle	2000–01	31	3	3	0	2	0	2	0	38	3
Inverness Caledonian Thistle	2001–02	33	2	4	0	4	0	1	0	42	0
Inverness Caledonian Thistle	2002–03	34	0	4	0	3	0	-	-	41	0
Inverness Caledonian Thistle	2003–04	32	3	5	1	1	0	5	0	43	4
Inverness Caledonian Thistle	2004–05	36	2	2	0	2	0	-	-	40	2
Inverness Caledonian Thistle	2005–06	18	0	2	1	1	1	-	-	21	2
Inverness Caledonian Thistle	2006–07	32	1	3	1	2	0	-	-	37	2
Inverness Caledonian Thistle	2007–08	33	3	1	0	2	0	-	-	36	3
Inverness Caledonian Thistle	2008–09	22	1	2	0	1	0	-	-	25	1
Inverness Caledonian Thistle	Total	271	15	26	3	18	1	8	0	323	19
Career total		399	29	36	4	26	2	11	0	472	35

== Honours ==
=== Ross County ===
- Scottish Third Division: 1

1998–99

=== Inverness Caledonian Thistle ===
- Scottish First Division: 1

2003–04, 2009–10
