= Martin Bavidge =

Scottish footballer

Personal information
- Full name: Martin Bavidge
- Date of birth: 30 April 1980 (age 46)
- Place of birth: Aberdeen, Scotland
- Position: Striker

Youth career
- –1998: Forres Mechanics

Senior career*
Years	Team	Apps	(Gls)
1998–2002	Inverness Caledonian Thistle	96	(16)
2002–2003	Forfar Athletic	36	(15)
2003–2013	Peterhead	298	(98)
2013–2017	Inverurie Loco Works		
- * Club domestic league appearances and goals as of 27 August 2017

Martin Bavidge (born 30 April 1980) is a Scottish retired professional footballer. He played as a forward.

Bavidge started his career with Forres Mechanics in the Highland Football League before going on to play for Inverness Caledonian Thistle, Forfar Athletic, Peterhead and Inverurie Loco Works.

Bavidge has worked in the oil industry since 2003. He missed a Scottish Cup replay against Raith Rovers in December 2009, due to having to travel to Texas to satisfy work commitments. Raith won the game 4–1.

On Tuesday 18 September 2012, Peterhead played at home to Aberdeen in a testimonial match for Bavidge to celebrate ten years of good service to the Balmoor side. The Dons won the game 4–0.

Martin is the father of professional footballer Alfie Bavidge; his own father Mitch also played at a high level, mainly in the Highland League.
