= Mike Teasdale =

Scottish footballer

Personal information
- Date of birth: 28 July 1969 (age 56)
- Place of birth: Elgin, Scotland
- Position: Midfielder

Senior career*
Years	Team	Apps	(Gls)
1993–1996	Dundee	23	(1)
1995–2002	Inverness Caledonian Thistle	182	(16)
2002–2004	Elgin City	32	(4)
- * Club domestic league appearances and goals

Mike Teasdale (born 28 July 1969) is a Scottish former footballer, who played for Elgin City, Dundee and Inverness Caledonian Thistle.

== Personal life ==
Teasdale's son, Joseph, plays in the Aberdeen Academy, and is currently on loan at Scottish League One side, Kelty Hearts.
