= Dennis Wyness =

Scottish footballer

Personal information
- Date of birth: 22 March 1977 (age 49)
- Place of birth: Dunbeg, Scotland
- Position: Striker

Senior career*
Years	Team	Apps	(Gls)
1996–2000	Aberdeen	23	(2)
1999	→ Inverness Caledonian Thistle (loan)	12	(0)
2000–2003	Inverness Caledonian Thistle	116	(67)
2003–2006	Heart of Midlothian	57	(11)
2005–2006	→ Inverness Caledonian Thistle (loan)	27	(8)
2006–2008	Inverness Caledonian Thistle	44	(6)
2008–2010	St Mirren	31	(2)
2009–2010	→ Queen of the South (loan)	7	(2)
2010	Dumbarton	17	(5)
2010–2012	Peterhead	56	(9)
2012–2015	Elgin City	67	(14)
2015–2016	Buckie Thistle		
2016–2018	Huntly		
- * Club domestic league appearances and goals

Dennis Wyness (born 22 March 1977) is a Scottish retired footballer. He played either as an attacking midfielder or as a striker.

He has previously played for Aberdeen, Inverness Caledonian Thistle, Hearts, St Mirren, Queen of the South, Dumbarton, Peterhead, Elgin City and Huntly.

Notably, Wyness scored over 100 goals for Inverness during two spells with the club.

== Career ==
Wyness began his career at Aberdeen, where he originally played as a midfielder. He was used sparingly as a squad player by several managers, until Ebbe Skovdahl allowed him to go on loan to Inverness Caledonian Thistle in 1999, where he played as a midfielder, then as a striker. Wyness signed a permanent contract for Caley Thistle in January 2000. However, during his first twelve months at the club he struggled to make an impact, and was eventually transfer-listed by then-manager Steve Paterson. This provided Wyness with a huge incentive to fight his way back into the team and he responded to his transfer listing by beginning to score goals almost immediately. He was eventually taken off the transfer list in December 2000, and soon became a firm favourite of the Caley Thistle supporters.

=== Caley Thistle ===
Wyness was Caley Thistle's top scorer of season 2000–01, with 24 league goals. The following season, he netted 18 times in the league and, in season 2001–02, established a strike partnership with Paul Ritchie which resulted in 37 league goals between the two of them that season. In March 2003 he also scored the only goal of the game as Caley Thistle once again sent Celtic crashing out of the Scottish Cup.

=== Heart of Midlothian ===
Wyness's excellent performances in front of goal earned him a move to Heart of Midlothian in the summer of 2003. Wyness found it hard to break into the Hearts team and was only occasionally used by Levein. He fared better under Craig Levein's successor, John Robertson, who had also managed him at Caley Thistle, but when Robertson was replaced by George Burley in 2005 Wyness once again found himself out of favour. He returned on loan to Caley Thistle and he signed a pre-contract agreement in January 2006 to rejoin the Inverness club on a permanent basis. In late May 2006, once his Hearts contract expired, he signed a two-year deal with Caley Thistle.

=== Record ===
Wyness holds the Inverness Caledonian Thistle scoring record, with a total of 101 goals which stands until Billy McKay scored his 102nd against Airdrie on 26, July 2023. He netted his 100th goal for Inverness against his first club, Aberdeen.

=== St. Mirren ===
In May 2008, Wyness agreed a two-year deal to join St Mirren. Wyness scored the first goal for the Buddies at their new ground named St. Mirren Park, in a match against Kilmarnock.

=== Queen of the South ===
On 25 September 2009 Dumfries club Queen of the South announced Wyness had joined on a three-month loan deal. Wyness netted a debut goal a day later in the 4–1 win away to Dunfermline Athletic that put Queens top of the table. Wyness returned to St. Mirren after making seven appearances and scoring two goals for Queens.

=== Recent career ===
On 25 January 2010, St. Mirren announced Wyness was free to find himself another club, and he was later released from his contract. Wyness then signed for Second Division club Dumbarton until the end of the 2009–10 season.

Wyness then signed for Peterhead for the 2010–11 season.

Wyness signed for Elgin City during the 2012 summer transfer window. He scored his first goal for the club in an incredible 7–5 home loss in the first round of the 2012–13 Ramsden's Cup against Arbroath.

After Elgin, he went on to play for Buckie Thistle in the 2015/16 season, and then signed for Huntly F.C. in 2016.
