= Paul Sheerin =

Scottish footballer (born 1974)

Personal information
- Full name: Paul George Sheerin
- Date of birth: 28 August 1974 (age 52)
- Place of birth: Edinburgh, Scotland
- Position: Midfielder

Team information
- Current team: Rangers (assistant manager)

Youth career
- Whitehill Welfare
- Celtic

Senior career*
Years	Team	Apps	(Gls)
1991–1992	Alloa Athletic	9	(0)
1992–1997	Southampton	0	(0)
1997	Östersunds FK	18	(3)
1997–1998	Alloa Athletic	3	(1)
1998–2001	Inverness Caledonian Thistle	115	(36)
2001–2002	Ayr United	53	(8)
2002–2004	Aberdeen	47	(9)
2004–2010	St Johnstone	187	(32)
2010–2014	Arbroath	129	(17)
Total		561	(106)

International career
1995	Scotland U21	1	(0)

Managerial career
- 2010–2014: Arbroath
- 2021: Aberdeen (interim)
- 2021: Falkirk
- * Club domestic league appearances and goals

Paul George Sheerin (born 28 August 1974) is a Scottish former football player and coach who is the assistant manager of Rangers.

Sheerin played as a midfielder for Alloa Athletic, Southampton, Östersunds FK, Inverness Caledonian Thistle, Ayr United, Aberdeen, St Johnstone and Arbroath.

While continuing as a player, he was appointed manager of Arbroath in May 2010. He held this post until June 2014, when he returned to Aberdeen as a youth team coach. Sheerin became manager of Falkirk in May 2021, but was sacked later that year. Latterly he was first-team coach at Kilmarnock, before joining Hearts in the same role in May 2025.

== Playing career ==
Sheerin signed as a professional for Alloa from junior side Whitehill Welfare, although he had been on the books of Celtic as a schoolboy. He signed for Southampton in October 1992 and, while at The Dell, he played under several managers, including Ian Branfoot, Alan Ball and Graeme Souness; however, he failed to break through and left in December 1997 without having made a first-team appearance. During his time at Southampton, he earned international recognition after playing for Scotland Under-21 in a 1–0 win over San Marino in November 1995.

After a summer playing in Sweden with Östersunds FK, he had a brief period back at his former club Alloa, before joining Inverness Caledonian Thistle in January 1998. His stint at Caley Thistle lasted to the end of the 2000–01 season, in which period he made 136 appearances, scoring 45 goals. He then had spells at Ayr United and Aberdeen, where he finished as the top scorer in the 2002–03 season. After leaving Aberdeen, Sheerin joined St Johnstone on the eve of the 2004–05 season on a free transfer, signing a two-year contract. On 15 November 2006, Sheerin was awarded the Scottish Football League "Player of the Month" award for October. He scored as St Johnstone won the 2007 Scottish Challenge Cup Final against Dunfermline Athletic. In May 2008, Sheerin had his contract extended with St Johnstone by another year.

== Coaching career ==
While still playing for the St Johnstone first team, Sheerin coached their under-17 team that won the SFL Under-17 Youth Division in 2008–09.

=== Arbroath manager ===
On 27 May 2010, Sheerin was confirmed as the new player/manager of Arbroath. He guided them to the Third Division championship in his first season in charge, the club's first national trophy win in their 133-year history. He agreed a new contract with Arbroath at the end of the 2010–11 season. The club was relegated after finishing bottom in the 2013–14 Scottish League One.

=== Aberdeen ===
After the end of the season, Sheerin left Arbroath and became the manager of Aberdeen's under-20 team. Aberdeen won the Development League title in his first season in 2014–15. The under-20 team also reached the Scottish Youth Cup final in 2017–18, but lost 3–1 to Hibernian.

Following the departure of Derek McInnes on 8 March 2021, Sheerin was appointed interim manager at Aberdeen. Sheerin took charge of one game, a 1–0 defeat against Dundee United, before the club appointed Stephen Glass as the new manager.

=== Falkirk manager ===
On 28 May 2021, Sheerin was named as the new head coach of Scottish League One side Falkirk. He was sacked by the club after a 6–0 defeat by Queen's Park which left them in fifth place, three points outside of the promotion play-off positions. Soon after leaving Falkirk, Sheerin took up a coaching position with Derek McInnes at Kilmarnock in January 2022. Sheerin became Kilmarnock assistant manager in June 2023, after Tony Docherty had left the club to become Dundee manager.

== Managerial statistics ==
As of match played 4 December 2021

Managerial record by team and tenure
Team	Nat	From	To	Record								Ref
Team	Nat	From	To	G	W	D	L	GF	GA	GD	Win %	Ref
Arbroath	(Scotland)	27 May 2010	20 May 2014	167	66	35	66	287	293	−6	39.52	
Aberdeen (interim)	(Scotland)	8 March 2021	12 April 2021	3	2	0	1	2	1	+1	66.67	
Falkirk	(Scotland)	28 May 2021	5 December 2021	23	8	4	11	31	37	−6	34.78	
Total				193	76	39	78	320	331	−11	39.38	—

== Honours ==
=== Player ===
St Johnstone

- Scottish First Division: 2008–09
- Scottish Challenge Cup: 2007–08

Arbroath

- Scottish Third Division: 2010–11

=== Manager ===
St Johnstone U-17

- SFL Under-17 Youth Division: 2008–09

Arbroath

- Scottish Third Division: 2010–11

Aberdeen U-20

- SPFL Development League: 2014–15
