= Ross Tokely =

Scottish footballer

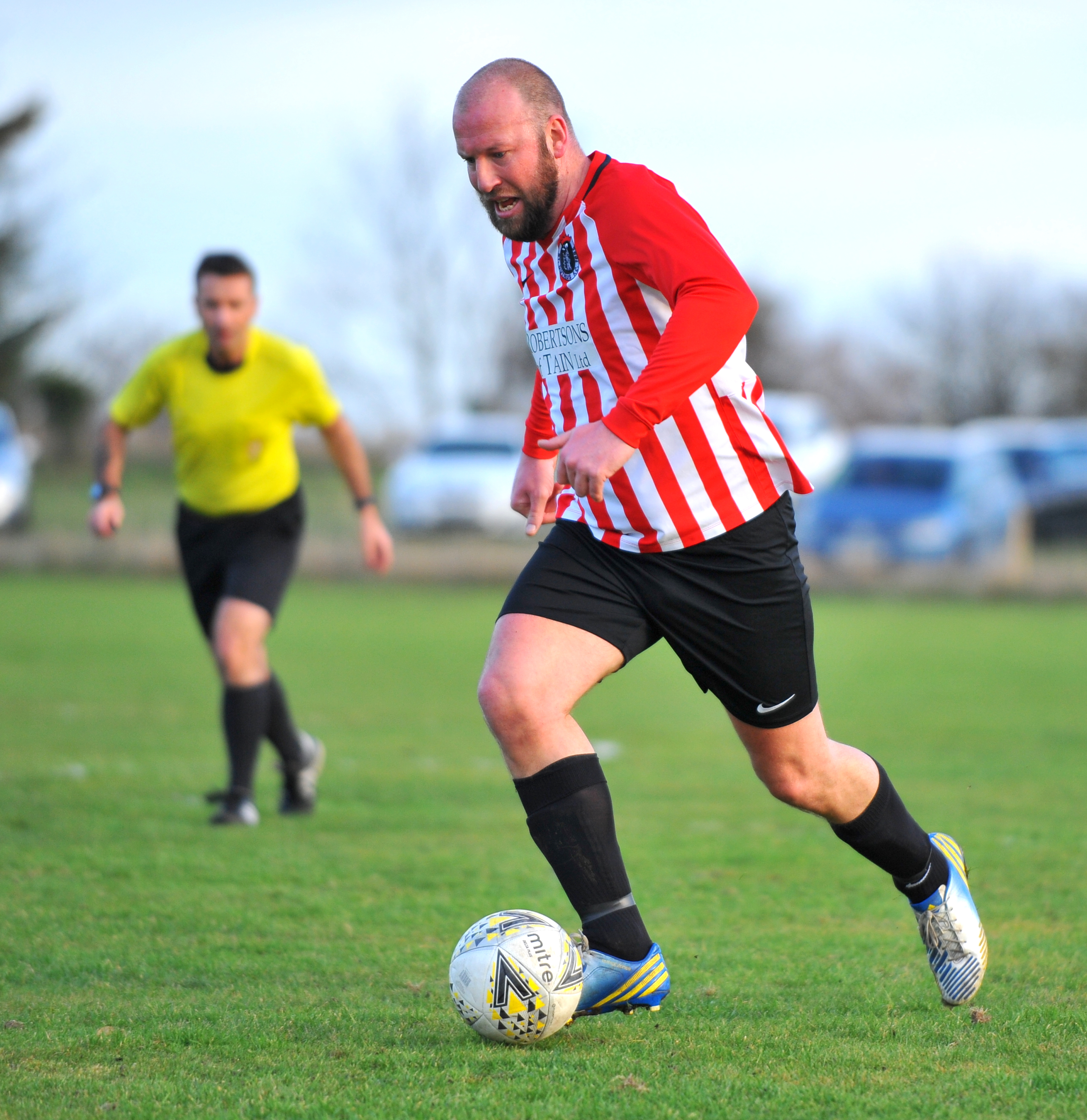
- Tokely playing for St Duthus in 2019

Personal information
- Full name: Ross Norman Tokely
- Date of birth: 8 March 1979 (age 47)
- Place of birth: Aberdeen, Scotland
- Position: Defender

Youth career
- 1995–1996: Huntly

Senior career*
| Years | Team | Apps | (Gls) |
| 1996–2012 | Inverness Caledonian Thistle | 593 | (30) |
| 2012–2013 | Ross County | 17 | (0) |
| 2013–2018 | Brora Rangers | 40 | (7) |
| 2018–2022 | St Duthus | 19 | (2) |
| 2022–2024 | Nairn County | 51 | (7) |
| Total | | 720 | (46) |

Managerial career
- 2016–2018: Brora Rangers
- 2024–2025: Nairn County
- * Club domestic league appearances and goals

Ross Tokely (born 8 March 1979) is a Scottish football coach and former professional player who played for Inverness Caledonian Thistle, Ross County, Brora Rangers, and Nairn County, he was previously the manager Nairn County, and is currently coaching with Inverness Caledonian Thistles youth Academy.

Tokely joined Inverness from Highland League club Huntly in 1996 and remained at the club until June 2012, for a total of 16 seasons at the Inverness club. Tokely was ICT's longest serving player and currently holds their appearance record. He also holds the distinction of having played and scored in every division of Scottish league football, from Third Division to the SPL, for Inverness.

== Playing career ==
=== Inverness ===
Tokely was born in Aberdeen. He was signed to Inverness Caledonian Thistle by manager Steve Paterson and made his first appearance in the side that won the Third Division title in 1997. Tokely gradually established himself in the side, usually playing at right back, although he has sometimes played in central defence or as a holding midfielder.

Tokely retained his place in the team as Inverness progressed through the Third Division and Second Division to the First Division.

Tokely also had more positive successes during this period, notably a fantastic goal against his boyhood heroes Hearts in the 2002 Scottish Cup. Tokely hit a 20-yard shot into the top corner at Tynecastle as Inverness defeated another SPL club in the cup, having won 3–1 at Celtic Park in 2000. Tokely also scored the winning penalty in a shoot-out against Dunfermline Athletic in the following season's League Cup.

Tokely was part of the squad that won promotion to the SPL in 2004, by winning the First Division title. As Inverness moved into the SPL, he retained his spot in the side, being awarded the number 2 jersey. After 10 years of service to the club, Tokely was awarded a testimonial match against Sheffield United.

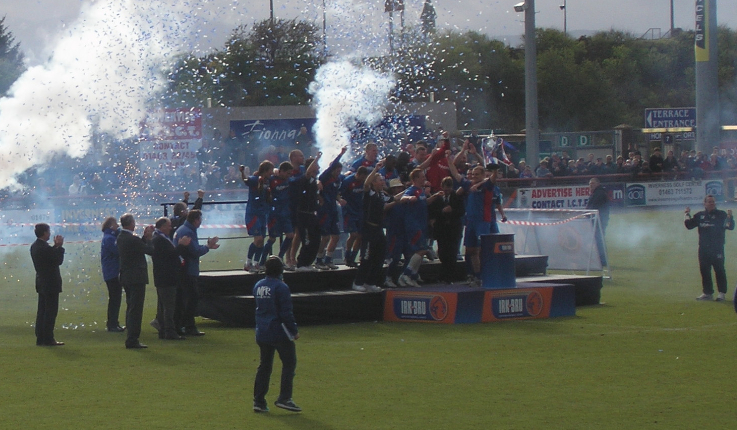
Tokely on stage as the Inverness team celebrate winning the First Division title in May 2010 at the Caledonian Stadium

Throughout their five-year stint in the top league, Tokely was an established player in the side. His longest spell out of the team came in 2007, when he missed a month of first team action after being sent off for an off the ball punch on Motherwell player Steven McGarry. As the Highland club unsuccessfully battled against relegation in 2009, manager Terry Butcher joked that he wanted his side to achieve more league points than Tokely's total of disciplinary points. Tokely racked up further disciplinary points as he was sent off for a professional foul on the final day of the season against Falkirk. Inverness went on to lose the decisive match 1–0, and were consequently relegated.

Nonetheless, Tokely retained his place in the Inverness side after their drop back down to the First Division, helping the club gain promotion straight back to the SPL in 2010. He was made captain of the team for his 500th appearance for Inverness, a 1–0 win against Airdrie United. Tokely agreed a new contract with Inverness in June 2010, despite receiving offers from overseas. In May 2012, he rejected a contract offer from Inverness and ended his 16-year career with the club.

=== Ross County ===
On 7 June 2012, Tokely signed for Ross County on a one-year contract.

=== Brora Rangers ===
Tokely joined Brora Rangers as a player/coach in January 2013. On Saturday 5 October Brora drew 1–1 with league rivals Cove Rangers, but went on to beat them 3–0 away from home in the Scottish Cup, flying high in the Highland League, Brora were favourites to beat Clyde in the 2nd round but lost 2–1 at Broadwood.

In 2013–14 Brora won the Highland League for the first time in their history - by twenty-clear-points. They also won the North Of Scotland Cup for the fourth time when they beat Elgin City in the 2014–15 final.

On 26 July 2014, Brora knocked Stenhousemuir out of the Challenge Cup after extra-time 3–1 courtesy of an Alex Sutherland hat-trick, before being beaten by East Fife in the second round 3–1.

=== St Duthus ===
Midway through the 2018–19 season, Tokely made a return to senior football when he joined North Caledonian League club St Duthus. During his time with the Tain based club, he won two cup medals, the Football Times Cup in 2020, and the North Caledonian Cup in 2022.

=== Nairn County ===
After starting the 2022–23 season with St Duthus, Tokely was released to sign for Nairn County on 24 October 2022. He was criticised for violent behaviour during a friendly match in July 2023. Tokely decided to end his playing career at the end of 2023–24.

== Coaching career ==
Tokely was appointed Brora Rangers manager in December 2016. Brora knocked SPFL clubs Stranraer and East Fife out of the 2017–18 Scottish Cup, before eventually losing to Premiership club Kilmarnock in the fifth round. They had poorer results in the 2017–18 Highland Football League, however, and Tokely left the club near the end of the season.

Tokely returned to Inverness to become their Under 16 Youth Team coach.

On 26 April 2024, Tokely was appointed as manager of Highland Football League club Nairn County. In January 2025, Tokely stepped down from the role.

== Honours ==
Inverness Caledonian Thistle

- Scottish First Division: 2003–04, 2009–10
- Scottish Third Division: 1996–97
- Scottish Challenge Cup: 2003–04

Brora Rangers

- Highland League: 2013–14, 2014–2015
- North Of Scotland Cup: 2013–14, 2014–15

St Duthus

- Football Times Cup: 2019-20
- North Caledonian Cup: 2021-22

Nairn County

- North Of Scotland Cup: 2023–24
