= Bobby Mann =

Scottish footballer

Personal information
- Full name: Robert Alexander Mann
- Date of birth: 11 January 1974 (age 52)
- Place of birth: Dundee, Scotland
- Position: Defender

Youth career
- 1991–1992: St Johnstone

Senior career*
Years	Team	Apps	(Gls)
1992–1999	Forfar Athletic	230	(25)
1999–2004	Inverness Caledonian Thistle	171	(14)
2004–2007	Dundee	81	(4)
2007–2011	Peterhead	58	(14)
2011–2012	Formartine United		
- * Club domestic league appearances and goals as of 6 October 2020

Robert Alexander Mann (born 11 January 1974) is a Scottish former professional footballer who last played for Formartine United.

During his youth career, Mann played for St Columba U9s, West Park U10s, Fairmuir u11s to U15s and Dundee United Social Club U16s.

Mann, a defender, started his career with St Johnstone in 1991 before joining Forfar Athletic a year later. He remained with Forfar for 7 years before moving to Inverness Caledonian Thistle in 1999. He was part of the Inverness team who famously defeated Celtic in the Scottish Cup in February 2000 and he helped them reach the Scottish Premier League for the first time in season 2003–04.

Despite having reached the Premier League with Inverness, he joined fellow Premier League club Dundee. In his first season at Dens Park, Dundee were relegated to the First Division. Although he was appointed club captain, Mann became an increasingly peripheral figure for the Dark Blues during the 2006–07 season. He reached an agreement to leave Dens Park and was re-united with former boss Steve Paterson on 31 January 2007, after signing with Scottish 2nd Division side Peterhead. Mann was once again re-united with Paterson when he left Peterhead and signed for Scottish Highland League side Formartine United F.C as player/assistant manager to Paterson.

Ian McCall once said of Bobby Mann, after missing out on his signing when manager of Dundee United, "Bobby Mann is without a doubt the best distributor of a ball from defence, bar none".

Current status: Bobby is currently a taxi driver in the City of Dundee
