= Barry Wilson (footballer) =

Scottish footballer and manager

Personal information
- Full name: Barry John Wilson
- Date of birth: 16 February 1972 (age 54)
- Place of birth: Kirkcaldy, Scotland
- Position: Midfielder

Senior career*
Years	Team	Apps	(Gls)
1992	Southampton	0	(0)
1992–1994	Ross County	3	(1)
1994–1996	Raith Rovers	39	(5)
1996–2000	Inverness Caledonian Thistle	83	(28)
2000–2003	Livingston	101	(25)
2003–2008	Inverness Caledonian Thistle	170	(32)
2008	→ St Johnstone (loan)	6	(1)
2008–2010	Queen of the South	28	(5)
2010	Peterhead	16	(5)
2010–2012	Elgin City	28	(4)
2013	Wick Academy	4	(0)
Total		478	(106)

Managerial career
- 2012–2014: Wick Academy
- 2014: Elgin City
- * Club domestic league appearances and goals as of 6 April 2013 (UTC)

Barry John Wilson (born 16 February 1972 in Kirkcaldy) is a Scottish football coach and former player.

== Playing career ==
Wilson began his career in the Highland League at Ross County, where his father, Bobby Wilson, was manager. After a spell at Southampton, where he failed to break into the first team, he returned to Ross County before moving to Raith Rovers in 1994. He was a member of the Raith squad that played in the 1995–96 UEFA Cup. In July 1996 Wilson signed for Inverness Caledonian Thistle and helped them to the Scottish Third Division title in 1996–97. In the following few seasons Wilson established himself as a firm favourite of the Caley Thistle fans, with his extraordinarily quick runs down the right wing and his ability to both create and score goals.

During season 1999–00, Caley Thistle's then-manager Steve Paterson decided to move Wilson up front as a striker, which proved an extremely successful tactic, with Wilson scoring a number of goals that season. In the summer of 2000, Wilson was sold to Livingston, with whom he won the Scottish First Division title and was promoted to the SPL.

After three years at Livingston, Wilson returned to Caley Thistle in August 2003, under the management of John Robertson. Since then he has once again proved a valuable asset to the team.

Wilson holds Scottish First Division winner's medals, won with Caley Thistle, Livingston and Raith Rovers, a Scottish Third Division winner's medal, won with Caley Thistle and a Challenge Cup winner's medal, also won with Caley Thistle. His most historic achievement was in scoring the last senior Scottish goal of the old millennium (against Clydebank, 27 December 1999) and the first of the new millennium (against Livingston, 3 January 2000). He is also famous for scoring the opening goal when Caley Thistle beat Celtic 3–1 at Parkhead in the Scottish Cup on 8 February 2000.

Wilson joined St Johnstone on a one-month emergency loan in March 2008. He scored his first and only goal for St Johnstone in a 2–1 loss against Clyde. He returned to Caley Thistle after his loan spell with St Johnstone to win himself a new contract and went on to produce some outstanding performances in the closing games. This resulted in Craig Brewster awarding Wilson with a new 6-month contract. In December 2008, it was announced that Caley Thistle would not be offering Wilson a new contract and thus he would be free to move on when his current contract expired.

Wilson joined Dumfries club Queen of the South on 30 December 2008, after being released a month early from his Inverness contract He made his debut on 3 January 2009 in a Scottish Football League First Division match away to Morton. On 8 December 2009 the Queens website announced Wilson would be leaving in the January transfer window to return to Inverness where his home is. Manager Gordon Chisholm said of Wilson, "He's netted a lot of valuable goals for us and his experience has been a great asset". He had a short spell at Peterhead before joining Elgin City prior to the 2010–11 season in a player-coach role.

== Managerial career ==
Wilson was appointed manager of Highland League side Wick Academy on 23 October 2012, taking over from former Raith teammate Davie Kirkwood. His first game in charge came against Keith and saw his team run out 5–1 winners, sending them top of the Highland League. Wilson appeared as a substitute on 27 February 2013 during Wick's 4–0 victory over title rivals Clachnacuddin to bring them back to the top of the Highland League. Wilson signed a new contract with Wick Academy in March 2013.

Queen of the South offered Wilson their vacant managers position in June 2013, but after discussions Wilson turned down their offer to stay at Wick. Wilson was appointed manager of Elgin City in January 2014. He resigned from that position in November 2014, after losing a Scottish Cup tie against junior club Bo'ness.

In July 2018, Wilson returned to Inverness Caledonian Thistle as a coach, working with both the first team and the under-18 squad. He later became assistant manager, working along with Billy Dodds, until he was sacked by Inverness in September 2023.

== Managerial statistics ==
As of 17 November 2014

Team	Nat	From	To	Competitive Record							
Team	Nat	From	To	G	W	D	L	GF	GA	GD	Win %
Wick Academy	(Scotland)	October 2012	January 2014	52	32	4	16	154	77	+77	61.54
Elgin City	(Scotland)	January 2014	November 2014	33	6	9	18	46	69	−23	18.18
Total				85	38	13	34	200	136	+64	44.71

== Honours ==
Raith Rovers

- Scottish First Division: 1995–96

Inverness Caledonian Thistle

- Scottish Third Division: 1996–97
- Scottish Second Division promotion: 1997–98
- Scottish Challenge Cup: 2003–04
- Scottish First Division: 2003–04

Livingston

- Scottish First Division: 2000–01
