= 1996–97 Inverness Caledonian Thistle F.C. season =

Scottish football club season

Inverness Caledonian Thistle F.C.
1996-97 season
- Manager: Steve Paterson
- Scottish Third Division: 1st - Champions
- Scottish Cup: 3rd Round
- Scottish League Cup: 1st Round
- Scottish Challenge Cup: 2nd Round
- Top goalscorer: League: Iain Stewart (27); All: Iain Stewart (29)
- Highest home attendance: 5,525 vs. Ross County, 15 March 1997 (Caledonian Stadium); 2,086 vs. Arbroath, 5 October 1996 (Telford Street Park)
- Lowest home attendance: 1,316 vs. East Stirlingshire, 14 September 1996 (Telford Street Park); 1,397 vs. Alloa Athletic, 1 March 1997 (Caledonian Stadium)

Inverness Caledonian Thistle F.C. competed in the Scottish Third Division in season 1996–97 and the Scottish League Cup, the Scottish Challenge Cup and Scottish Cup.

== Results ==
=== Friendlies ===
20 July 1996 Friendly (Buchan Cup)	Fraserburgh	2–3	Inverness Caledonian Thistle
15:00

21 July 1996 Friendly (Buchan Cup)	St. Johnstone F.C.	1–0	Inverness Caledonian Thistle
15:00

26 July 1996 Friendly	Inverness Caledonian Thistle	2–0	Queen of the South
19:30

29 July 1996 Friendly	Inverness Caledonian Thistle	0–0	Hamilton Academical
19:30

20 October 1996 Friendly	Inverness Caledonian Thistle	0–3	Highland League Select
15:00

6 November 1996 Friendly	Inverness Caledonian Thistle	6–2	Inverness & District Select
19:30				Attendance: 921

14 May 1997 Friendly	Inverness Caledonian Thistle	3–2	Aberdeen
19:30				Attendance: 2163

=== Scottish Third Division ===
Match Day	Date	Opponent	H/A	Score	ICT Scorer(s)	Attendance
1	17 August	Cowdenbeath	H	1–3	Thomson	1,524
2	24 August	Forfar Athletic	A	1–3	Thomson	427
3	31 August	Alloa Athletic	H	1–0	Teasdale	1,685
4	7 September	Albion Rovers	A	0–0		845
5	14 September	East Stirlingshire	H	2–0	Hercher, Noble	1,316
6	21 September	Queen's Park	H	2–2	Stewart, Christie	1,452
7	28 September	Ross County	A	3–1	Stewart (2), Thomson	3,519
8	5 October	Arbroath	H	2–0	Thomson, Stewart	2,086
9	12 October	Montrose	A	2–2	Stewart, Ross	643
10	19 October	Cowdenbeath	A	4–3	Thomson (2), Hercher, Stewart	321
11	26 October	Forfar Athletic	A	0–2		454
12	2 November	East Stirlingshire	A	0–0		398
13	9 November	Albion Rovers	H	1–1	Stewart	3,734
14	16 November	Ross County	H	2–0	Stewart (2)	4,562
15	23 November	Queen's Park	A	3–2	McLean, Wilson, Christie	786
16	30 November	Arbroath	A	4–1	Wilson, Addicoat, Stewart, Christie	457
17	14 December	Montrose	H	2–0	Stewart, McLean	2,477
18	21 December	Cowdenbeath	H	2–1	Stewart (2)	2,188
19	18 January	Arbroath	H	4–1	Hercher (2), McLean, Ross	1,742
20	22 January	Queen's Park	H	1–0	Stewart	1,432
21	1 February	Montrose	A	2–0	McLean, Stewart,	520
22	8 February	East Stirlingshire	H	3–2	Stewart, Wilson, McLean	1,642
23	12 February	Ross County	A	3–0	McLean (2), Wilson	4,482
24	15 February	Albion Rovers	A	3–0	Teasdale, Tokely, Stewart	608
25	22 February	Forfar Athletic	H	1–1	Stewart	2,507
26	1 March	Alloa Athletic	H	3-1	Stewart (2), Ross	1,397
27	8 March	Queen's Park	A	2–1	Stewart, Tokely	857
28	11 March	Alloa Athletic	A	2–0	McLean, Noble	441
29	15 March	Ross County	H	3–0	Stewart (2), Thomson	5,525
30	22 March	Arbroath	A	0–0		570
31	5 April	Montrose	H	3–2	Stewart (3)	3,026
32	12 April	Albion Rovers	H	4–1	Thomson (2), Wilson, De Barros	2,960
33	19 April	East Stirlingshire	A	3–0	Stewart, Ross, Thomson	404
34	26 April	Cowdenbeath	A	1–2	Cherry	282
35	3 May	Forfar Athletic	H	0–4		3,852
36	10 May	Alloa Athletic	A	0-1		507

==== Final League table ====
Pos	Team	Pld	W	D	L	GF	GA	GD	Pts	Promotion
1	Inverness Caledonian Thistle (C, P)	36	23	7	6	70	37	+33	76	Promotion to the Second Division
2	Forfar Athletic (P)	36	19	10	7	74	45	+29	67	Promotion to the Second Division
3	Ross County	36	20	7	9	58	41	+17	67	
4	Alloa Athletic	36	16	7	13	50	47	+3	55	
5	Albion Rovers	36	13	10	13	50	47	+3	49	

Source: Soccerway
Rules for classification: 1) points; 2) goal difference; 3) number of goals scored.
(C) Champions; (P) Promoted

=== Scottish League Cup ===
Round	Date	Opponent	H/A	Score	ICT Scorer(s)	Attendance
R1	5 August	Clyde	A	0-1 (aet)		899

=== Scottish Challenge Cup ===
Round	Date	Opponent	H/A	Score	ICT Scorer(s)	Attendance
R1	10 August	Livingston	A	2–1	Thomson, Cherry	1,335
R2	27 August	Stirling Albion	A	1–3	Stewart	838

=== Scottish Cup ===
Round	Date	Opponent	H/A	Score	ICT Scorer(s)	Attendance
R2	13 January	Stranraer	A	1–1	McLean	577
R2 R	15 January	Stranraer	H	0–0 (aet) (ICT won 4–3 on penalties)		1,407
R3	25 January	Hamilton Academical	H	1–3	Stewart	3,310

== Hat-tricks ==
Player	Competition	Score	Opponent	Date
(Scotland) Iain Stewart	Scottish Third Division	3–2	Montrose	5 April 1997
