= List of Inverness Caledonian Thistle F.C. seasons =

This is a list of seasons played by Inverness Caledonian Thistle Football Club in Scottish football from their formation in 1994, following the merger of Caledonian and Inverness Thistle.

== Seasons ==
Season	League	Tier	League									Scottish Cup	League Cup	Challenge Cup (Note: Scottish Premiership clubs are not eligible.)	Europe	Top league goalscorer		Average attendance
Season	League	Tier	Pld	W	D	L	GF	GA	GD	Pts	Pos	Scottish Cup	League Cup	Challenge Cup	Europe	Player	Goals	Average attendance
1994–95	SFL 3	4	36	12	9	15	48	61	−13	45	6th/10	R1	R2	R2	DNP	Charlie Christie; Alan Hercher	6	1,276
1995–96	SFL 3	4	36	15	12	9	64	38	+26	57	3rd/10	QF	R1	R1	DNP	Iain Stewart	24	1,579
1996–97	SFL 3	4	36	23	7	6	70	37	+33	76	1st/10 ↑	R3	R1	R2	DNP	Iain Stewart	27	2,495
1997–98	SFL 2	3	36	13	10	13	65	51	+14	49	5th/10	R4	R2	R1	DNP	Iain Stewart	16	1,762
1998–99	SFL 2	3	36	21	9	6	80	56	+32	72	2nd/10↑	R2	R2	NH	DNP	Scott McLean	19	2,119
1999–00	SFL 1	2	36	13	10	13	60	55	+5	49	6th/10	R4	R3	F	DNP	Barry Wilson	13	2,282
2000–01	SFL 1	2	36	14	12	10	71	54	+17	54	4th/10	R4	R2	R2	DNP	Dennis Wyness	25	2,133
2001–02	SFL 1	2	36	13	9	14	60	51	+9	48	6th/10	QF	QF	R2	DNP	Dennis Wyness	18	2,045
2002–03	SFL 1	2	36	20	5	11	74	45	+29	65	4th/10	SF	R3	R1	DNP	Dennis Wyness	19	2,181
2003–04	SFL 1	2	36	21	7	8	67	33	+34	70	1st/10↑	SF	R1	Winners	DNP	Paul Ritchie	14	2,374
2004–05	SPL	1	38	11	11	16	41	47	−6	44	8th/12	R4	R3	NE	DNP	Barry Wilson	10	4,067
2005–06	SPL	1	38	15	13	10	51	38	+13	58	7th/12	R4	QF	NE	DNP	Craig Dargo	17	5,061
2006–07	SPL	1	38	11	13	14	42	48	−6	46	8th/12	QF	R3	NE	DNP	Craig Dargo	10	4,814
2007–08	SPL	1	38	13	4	21	51	62	−11	43	9th/12	R4	QF	NE	DNP	Don Cowie	9	4,753
2008–09	SPL	1	38	10	7	21	37	58	−21	37	12th/12↓	QF	QF	NE	DNP	Adam Rooney	5	4,457
2009–10	SFL 1	2	36	21	10	5	72	32	+40	73	1st/10↑	R5	R3	F	DNP	Adam Rooney	24	3,509
2010–11	SPL	1	38	14	11	13	52	44	+8	53	7th/12	QF	R3	NE	DNP	Adam Rooney	15	4,526
2011–12	SPL	1	38	10	9	19	42	60	−18	39	10th/12	R5	R2	NE	DNP	Grégory Tadé	9	4,023
2012–13	SPL	1	38	13	15	10	64	60	+4	54	4th/12	R5	SF	NE	DNP	Billy McKay	23	4,038
2013–14	Premiership	1	38	16	9	13	44	44	0	57	5th/12	QF	F	NE	DNP	Billy McKay	18	3,558
2014–15	Premiership	1	38	19	8	11	52	42	+10	65	3rd/12	Winners	R2	NE	DNP	Billy McKay	10	3,733
2015–16	Premiership	1	38	14	10	14	54	48	+6	52	7th/12	QF	QF	NE	UEL 2Q	Miles Storey	11	3,754
2016–17	Premiership	1	38	7	13	18	44	71	−27	34	12th/12↓	R5	R2	R1 (U20s)	DNP	Alex Fisher	8	3,946
2017–18	Championship	2	36	16	9	11	53	37	+16	57	5th/10	R4	GRP	Winners	DNP	George Oakley; Iain Vigurs	8	2,395
2018–19	Championship	2	36	14	14	8	48	40	+8	56	3rd/10	SF	GRP	R1	DNP	Jordan White	7	2,548
2019–20	Championship	2	27	14	3	10	39	32	+7	45	2nd/10^{1}	QF	GRP	Shared	DNP	Jordan White	7	1,962
2020–21	Championship	2	27	8	12	7	36	31	+6	36	5th/10	R4	GRP	NH	DNP	Nikolay Todorov	9	46
2021–22	Championship	2	36	16	11	9	53	34	+19	59	3rd/10	R3	GRP	QF	DNP	Shane Sutherland	10	1,914
2022–23	Championship	2	36	15	10	11	52	47	+5	55	6th/10	F	R2	R4	DNP	Billy Mckay	14	2,277
2023–24	Championship	2	36	10	12	14	41	40	+1	42	9th/10 ↓	R5	GRP	R3	DNP	Billy Mckay	8	2,289
2024–25	League One	3	36	16	10	10	45	38	+7	41*	7th/10	R3	GRP	R4	DNP	Keith Bray	10	1,694
2025–26	League One	3	36	21	11	4	60	24	+36	69**	1st/10 ↑	R4	GRP	F	DNP	Chanka Zimba	11	2,306
2026–27	Championship	2	36								/10				DNP			
Total (after season 2025–26)			1,158	469	315	374	1,702	1,458	+273	1,700								

== Key ==
Winners	Runners-up	Promoted	Relegated	Abandoned

- Pld = Played
- W = Games won
- D = Games drawn
- L = Games lost
- GF = Goals for
- GA = Goals against
- GD = Goal difference
- Pts = Points
- P = Final position

- NE = Not Eligible
- NH = Not Held
- DNP = Did Not Participate
- 1Q = First Qualifying Round
- 2Q = Second Qualifying Round
- 3Q = Third Qualifying Round
- POR = Play-Off Round
- GRP = Group Stage

- R1 = Round 1
- R2 = Round 2
- R3 = Round 3
- R4 = Round 4
- R5 = Round 5
- QF = Quarter-finals
- SF = Semi-finals
- F = Final

- Premiership = Scottish Premiership
- Championship = Scottish Championship
- League One = Scottish League One
- SPL = Scottish Premier League
- SFL 1 = Scottish First Division
- SFL 2 = Scottish Second Division
- SFL 3 = Scottish Third Division
- ^{1} = Decided on a Points Per Game system, finished on 1.67 PPG
- * = After 15 point deduction due to entering administration
- ** = After 5 point deduction for prior season's administration
