= 1997–98 Inverness Caledonian Thistle F.C. season =

Scottish football club season

Inverness Caledonian Thistle F.C.
1997-98 season
- Manager: Steve Paterson
- Scottish Second Division: 5th
- Scottish Cup: 4th Round
- Scottish League Cup: 2nd Round
- Scottish Challenge Cup: 1st Round
- Top goalscorer: League: Iain Stewart (16); All: Iain Stewart; Brian Thomson (20)
- Highest home attendance: 5,821 vs. Dundee United, 18 February 1998
- Lowest home attendance: 944 vs. Queen of the South, 13 August 1997

Inverness Caledonian Thistle F.C. competed in the Scottish Second Division in season 1997–98 and the Scottish League Cup, the Scottish Challenge Cup and Scottish Cup.

== Results ==
=== Friendlies ===
19 July 1997 Friendly	Wick Academy	5–0	Inverness Caledonian Thistle
15:00				Attendance: 150

20 July 1997 Friendly	Inverness Caledonian Thistle	1–3	Dunfermline Athletic
15:00				Attendance: 753

21 July 1997 Friendly	Lewis & Harris Select (B)	4–0	Inverness Caledonian Thistle
19:30				Attendance: 250

22 July 1997 Friendly	Lewis & Harris Select (A)	7–1	Inverness Caledonian Thistle
19:30				Attendance: 550

23 July 1997 Friendly	Deveronvale	2–2	Inverness Caledonian Thistle
19:30				Attendance: 150

25 July 1997 Friendly	Inverness Caledonian Thistle	3–1	Huntly
19:30				Attendance: 253

28 July 1997 Testimonial/Alan Hercher	Inverness Caledonian Thistle	1–3	St. Johnstone
19:30				Attendance: 1204

7 October 1997 Friendly	Inverness Caledonian Thistle	3–4	Rangers
19:30				Attendance: 4336

17 May 1998 Friendly/Cerebral Palsy Benefit	Inverness Caledonian Thistle	0–0	Chic Charnley Select
15:00

7 April 1998 Testimonial/Charlie Christie	Inverness Caledonian Thistle	3–3	Celtic
19:30				Attendance: 1565

=== Scottish Second Division ===
Match Day	Date	Opponent	H/A	Score	ICT Scorer(s)	Attendance
1	6 August	Livingston	H	1–1	Thomson	2,232
2	16 August	Brechin City	A	2–2	Thomson, Stewart	459
3	23 August	East Fife	H	0–1		1,746
4	30 August	Albion Rovers	A	2–3	Thomson, Addicoat	442
5	13 September	Stranraer	H	2–2	Shearer, Stewart	1,571
6	20 September	Queen of the South	A	1–2	Wilson	1,145
7	27 September	Clyde	H	1–2	McCulloch	1,751
8	4 October	Forfar Athletic	A	1–2	Stewart	531
9	18 October	Clydebank	H	0–0		1,542
10	25 October	East Fife	A	5–1	Stewart (3), Shearer, Cherry	772
11	1 November	Brechin City	H	0–0		1,905
12	8 November	Stenhousemuir	H	4–1	Thomson, Wilson, Addicoat, Stewart	1,669
13	15 November	Stranraer	A	1–2	Thomson	644
14	22 November	Clyde	A	3–4	Thomson, Cherry, Stewart	953
15	29 November	Queen of the South	H	2–1	Stewart (2)	1,820
16	13 December	Clydebank	A	1–1	Ross	326
17	20 December	Forfar Athletic	H	2–2	Cherry (2)	1,521
18	27 December	East Fife	H	4–0	Cherry, Robson, Teasdale, Wilson	2,134
19	17 January	Clyde	H	5–1	Stewart (2), Thomson, Wilson, Robertson	1,505
20	31 January	Queen of the South	A	0–1		1,322
21	7 February	Clydebank	H	3–2	Shearer (2), Thomson	1,863
22	21 February	Livingston	H	2–2	Shearer, McCulloch	2,197
23	25 February	Brechin City	A	1–3	Cherry	388
24	28 February	Stenhousemuir	A	3–0	Robson, Thomson, Cherry	643
25	3 March	Livingston	A	2–2	Robson, Wilson	751
26	7 March	Stranraer	H	1-2	Cherry	1,582
27	10 March	Forfar Athletic	A	2–1	Sheerin (2)	432
28	14 March	Clyde	A	6–1	Thomson (2), Wilson, Sheerin, McLean, Stewart	766
29	21 March	Queen of the South	H	0–2		1,989
30	28 March	Clydebank	A	0–1		344
31	4 April	Forfar Athletic	H	0–0		1,315
32	11 April	Stenhousemuir	H	2–1	Teasdale (2)	1,414
33	18 April	Stranraer	A	1–3	Stewart	667
34	25 April	East Fife	A	1–0	Thomson	650
35	2 May	Brechin City	H	2–1	Thomson, Stewart	1,955
36	9 May	Livingston	A	2-1	Stewart, Sheerin	2,812

==== Final League table ====
Pos	Team	Pld	W	D	L	GF	GA	GD	Pts
3	Livingston	36	16	11	9	56	40	+16	59
4	Queen of the South	36	15	9	12	57	51	+6	54
5	Inverness CT	36	13	10	13	65	51	+14	49
6	East Fife	36	14	6	16	51	59	−8	48
7	Forfar Athletic	36	12	10	14	51	61	−10	46

Source: "1997-1998 Second Division - SPFL Archive". SPFL (in Malay).
Rules for classification: 1) points; 2) goal difference; 3) number of goals scored.

=== Scottish League Cup ===
Round	Date	Opponent	H/A	Score	ICT Scorer(s)	Attendance
R1	2 August	Stenhousemuir	H	5–1	Thomson (3), Christie, Wilson	1,715
R2	9 August	Motherwell	A	2–2 (aet, Motherwell won 4–1 on penalties)	Thomson (3), Addicoat	4,247

=== Scottish Challenge Cup ===
Round	Date	Opponent	H/A	Score	ICT Scorer(s)	Attendance
R1	13 August	Queen of the South	H	0–2		944

=== Scottish Cup ===
Round	Date	Opponent	H/A	Score	ICT Scorer(s)	Attendance
R1	6 December	Whitehill Welfare	H	3–1	Stewart, Wilson	1,173
R2	3 January	Queen's Park	H	2–0	Robson, Stewart	1,281
R3	24 January	Annan Athletic	H	8-1	Wilson (2), Thomson (2), Stewart, Robson, Leslie (own goal), Shearer	3,310
R4	14 February	Dundee United	A	1-1	Sheerin	8,770
R4 R	24 January	Dundee United	H	2-3	Thomson, McCulloch	5,821

=== Inverness Cup ===
14 October 1997 Inverness Cup Final (1996/97)	Inverness Caledonian Thistle	2–0	Ross County
19:30

18 November 1997 Inverness Cup R1	Inverness Caledonian Thistle	7–2	Lossiemouth
19:30

9 December 1997 Inverness Cup Semi-final	Forres Mechanics	1–6	Inverness Caledonian Thistle
19:30

6 January 1998 Inverness Cup Final	Inverness Caledonian Thistle	2–1	Clachnacuddin
19:30

=== North Cup ===
14 March 1998 North Cup R1	Inverness Caledonian Thistle	1–1	Forres Mechanics
15:00				Attendance: 766

21 March 1998 North Cup R1 (replay)	Forres Mechanics	1–2	Inverness Caledonian Thistle
15:00

28 March 1998 North Cup R2	Inverness Caledonian Thistle	2–1	Clachnacuddin
15:00

== Hat-tricks ==
Player	Competition	Score	Opponent	Date
(Scotland) Brian Thomson	Scottish League Cup	5–1	Stenhousemuir	2 August 1997
(Scotland) Iain Stewart	Scottish Second Division	1–5	East Fife	25 October 1997
