= 1995–96 Caledonian Thistle F.C. season =

Scottish football club season

Caledonian Thistle F.C.
1995-96 season
- Manager: Steve Paterson
- Scottish Third Division: 3rd
- Scottish Cup: Quarter-final
- Scottish League Cup: 1st Round
- Scottish Challenge Cup: 1st Round
- Top goalscorer: League: Iain Stewart (24); All: Iain Stewart (25)
- Highest home attendance: 11,296 vs. Rangers, 9 March 1996 (Tannadice Park); 4,931 vs. Ross County, 23 January 1996 (Telford Street Park)
- Lowest home attendance: 673 vs. Albion Rovers, 20 April 1996

Caledonian Thistle F.C. competed in the Scottish Third Division in season 1995–96 and the Scottish League Cup, the Scottish Challenge Cup and Scottish Cup.

== Results ==
=== Friendlies ===
23 July 1995 Friendly	Lossiemouth	3–2	Caledonian Thistle
15:00

26 July 1995 Friendly	Buckie Thistle	1–5	Caledonian Thistle
15:00

28 July 1995 Friendly	Caledonian Thistle	2–0	Motherwell
15:00

29 July 1995 Friendly	Inverurie Locos	2–1	Caledonian Thistle
15:00				Attendance: 1143

30 July 1995 Friendly	Huntly	2–0	Caledonian Thistle
19:30

=== Scottish Third Division ===
Match Day	Date	Opponent	H/A	Score	ICT Scorer(s)	Attendance
1	12 August	Livingston	H	0–3		1,576
2	26 August	Brechin City	H	1–2	Stewart	1,029
3	2 September	Albion Rovers	A	2–2	Hercher (2)	284
4	9 September	Queen's Park	H	3–1	Stewart, Green, Hercher	1,141
5	16 September	Arbroath	A	1–2	Stewart	587
6	23 September	Alloa Athletic	A	5–0	Christie (3), Stewart (2)	387
7	30 September	Ross County	H	1–1	Hercher	3,625
8	7 October	East Stirlingshire	A	5–0	Stewart (2), Brennan, Ross, Mitchell	381
9	14 October	Cowdenbeath	H	3–2	Hercher, Hastings, Stewart	1,378
10	21 October	Albion Rovers	H	6–1	Stewart (3), Mitchell (2), Ross	1,167
11	28 October	Brechin City	A	0–0		374
12	4 November	Arbroath	H	5–1	Christie (2), Stewart (2), Hastings	1,525
13	11 November	Queen's Park	A	3–0	Stewart (2), Hercher	597
14	18 November	Ross County	A	0–2		4,288
15	25 November	Alloa Athletic	H	1–1	Christie	1,181
16	2 December	East Stirlingshire	H	1–1	Ross	1,142
17	16 December	Cowdenbeath	A	0–0		230
18	13 January	Alloa Athletic	A	2–0	Thomson, Christie	410
19	17 January	Livingston	A	2–0	Christie, Teasdale	2,326
20	20 January	East Stirlingshire	A	5–1	Stewart (3), Scott, Ross	353
21	23 January	Ross County	H	1–1	Stewart	4,931
22	3 February	Cowdenbeath	A	1–2	Stewart	229
23	21 February	Arbroath	A	2–1	Stewart, Scott	726
24	24 February	Brechin City	H	0–1		2,343
25	28 February	Albion Rovers	A	2–0	Stewart, Hercher	368
26	2 March	Livingston	A	2–2	Sinclair (own goal), Teasdale	2,152
27	5 March	Queen's Park	H	1–1	Hercher	1,245
28	12 March	Alloa Athletic	H	0–0		1,162
29	16 March	Ross County	A	1–2	McAllister	3,670
30	23 March	Arbroath	H	1–1	Hercher	1,105
31	30 March	Queen's Park	A	2–1	Stewart, Christie	575
32	6 April	East Stirlingshire	H	0–3		965
33	13 April	Cowdenbeath	H	2–0	Christie, Thomson	721
34	20 April	Albion Rovers	H	1–1	Christie	673
35	27 April	Brechin City	A	1–0	Hercher	756
36	4 May	Livingston	H	1–2	Stewart	1,403

==== Final League table ====
Pos	Team	Pld	W	D	L	GF	GA	GD	Pts	Promotion
1	Livingston (C, P)	36	21	9	6	51	24	+27	72	Promotion to the Second Division
2	Brechin City (P)	36	18	9	9	41	21	+20	63	Promotion to the Second Division
3	Caledonian Thistle	36	15	12	9	64	38	+26	57	
4	Ross County	36	12	17	7	56	39	+17	53	
5	Arbroath	36	13	13	10	41	41	0	52	

Source: Soccerway
Rules for classification: 1) points; 2) goal difference; 3) number of goals scored.
(C) Champions; (P) Promoted

=== Scottish League Cup ===
Round	Date	Opponent	H/A	Score	ICT Scorer(s)	Attendance
R1	5 August	Berwick Rangers	A	1–1 (aet, Berwick won 5–3 on penalties)	Graham (own goal)	482

=== Scottish Challenge Cup ===
Round	Date	Opponent	H/A	Score	ICT Scorer(s)	Attendance
R1	22 August	Alloa Athletic	H	1–2	Macmillan	878

=== Scottish Cup ===
Round	Date	Opponent	H/A	Score	ICT Scorer(s)	Attendance
R2	6 January	Livingston	H	3–2	Ross, Teasdale, Hercher	1,845
R3	27 January	East Fife	H	1–1	Stewart	2,320
R3 R	12 February	East Fife	A	1–1 (aet, ICT won 3–1 on penalties)	Hercher	1,345
R4	17 February	Stenhousemuir	A	0-1	Thomson	2,300
QF	9 March	Rangers	H	0–3		11,296

== Hat-tricks ==
Player	Competition	Score	Opponent	Date
(Scotland) Charlie Christie	Scottish Third Division	0–5	Alloa Athletic	23 September 1995
(Scotland) Iain Stewart	Scottish Third Division	6–1	Albion Rovers	21 October 1995
(Scotland) Iain Stewart	Scottish Third Division	1–5	East Stirlingshire	20 January 1996
