= 1994–95 Caledonian Thistle F.C. season =

Scottish football club season

Caledonian Thistle F.C.
1994–95 season
- Manager: Sergei Pavlovich Baltacha
- Third Division: Sixth place
- Challenge Cup: First round, lost to Dundee
- League Cup: Second round, lost to Dundee
- Scottish Cup: First round, lost to Queen of the South
- Top goalscorer: League: Charlie Christie (6); Alan Hercher (6); All: Alan Hercher (7)
- Highest home attendance: 3,562 vs. Ross County, 6 May 1995
- Lowest home attendance: 491 vs. Albion Rovers, 11 April 1995

Caledonian Thistle F.C. made their Scottish Football League debut in the Scottish Third Division in season 1994–95. They also competed in the Scottish League Cup, the Scottish Challenge Cup and Scottish Cup.

== Results ==
=== Friendlies ===
30 July 1994 Friendly	Caledonian Thistle	0–3	St Mirren
15:00				Attendance: 850

3 August 1994 Friendly	Caledonian Thistle	0–2	Bolton Wanderers
15:00				Attendance: 850

6 August 1994 Friendly	Caledonian Thistle	0–0	Brechin City
15:00				Attendance: 850

17 September 1994 Friendly	Caledonian Thistle	1–4	Celtic
15:00				Attendance: 1143

8 May 1995 Friendly	Caledonian Thistle	2–2	Highland League Select
19:30

=== Scottish Third Division ===
Match Day	Date	Opponent	H/A	Score	ICT Scorer(s)	Attendance
1	13 August	Arbroath	H	5–2	Hercher (3), McKenzie, Robertson	1,700
2	20 August	Queen's Park	H	0–4		1,500
3	27 August	Ross County	A	3–1	McLeod, Somerville (own goals), Robertson	3,157
4	3 September	Albion Rovers	A	1–0	MacMillan	539
5	10 September	Forfar Athletic	H	3–1	Bennett (2), McKenzie	1,800
6	24 September	Alloa Athletic	A	1–1	Scott	596
7	1 October	East Stirlingshire	H	3–3	Noble, McAllister, Robertson	1,400
8	8 October	Cowdenbeath	H	0–3		1,400
9	15 October	Montrose	A	1–3	MacMillan	768
10	22 October	Arbroath	A	2–1	McCraw (2)	592
11	29 October	Ross County	H	0–0		2,440
12	5 November	Queen's Park	A	2–0	Robertson, McKenzie	742
13	12 November	Forfar Athletic	A	1–2	McAllister	647
14	19 November	Albion Rovers	H	2–1	Christie (2)	1,100
15	26 November	Alloa Athletic	H	2–2	Christie, Andrew	1,150
16	3 December	East Stirlingshire	A	0–2		508
17	26 December	Cowdenbeath	A	1–1	Andrew	461
18	2 January	Ross County	A	1–3	Andrew	2,749
19	14 January	Arbroath	H	1–1	Brennan	1,060
20	21 January	Queen's Park	A	1–4	MacDonald	506
21	4 February	Forfar Athletic	H	1–1	Scott	700
22	11 February	Albion Rovers	A	2–1	MacMillan, Lisle	274
23	14 February	Montrose	H	0–4		850
24	18 February	Alloa Athletic	A	0–1		386
25	25 February	East Stirlingshire	H	3–3	Christie (2), McKenzie	844
26	4 March	Cowdenbeath	H	3–1	McAllister, MacMillan, Mitchell	680
27	11 March	Montrose	A	1–0	Robertson	781
28	18 March	Forfar Athletic	A	1–4	Scott	538
29	1 April	East Stirlingshire	A	0–1		394
30	8 April	Alloa Athletic	H	0–1		913
31	11 April	Albion Rovers	H	0–2		491
32	15 April	Cowdenbeath	A	3–1	Bennett, Scott, Hercher	220
33	22 April	Montrose	H	0–3		942
34	29 April	Arbroath	A	0–2		515
35	6 May	Ross County	H	3–0	MacMillan, Hercher, Christie	3,562
36	13 May	Queen's Park	H	1–1	Hercher	640

==== Final League table ====
Pos	Team	Pld	W	D	L	GF	GA	GD	Pts
4	East Stirlingshire	36	18	5	13	61	50	+11	59
5	Alloa Athletic	36	15	9	12	50	45	+5	54
6	Caledonian Thistle	36	12	9	15	48	61	−13	45
7	Arbroath	36	13	5	18	51	62	−11	44
8	Queen's Park	36	12	6	18	46	57	−11	42

Source: Soccerway
Rules for classification: 1) points; 2) goal difference; 3) number of goals scored.

=== Scottish League Cup ===
Round	Date	Opponent	H/A	Score	ICT Scorer(s)	Attendance
R1	9 August	East Stirlingshire	A	2–0	Robertson, Hercher	899
R2	17 August	Dundee	A	0–3		3,112

=== Scottish Challenge Cup ===
Round	Date	Opponent	H/A	Score	ICT Scorer(s)	Attendance
R1	28 September	Dundee	H	1–1 (aet, Dundee won 4–3 on penalties)	McDonald	2,000

=== Scottish Cup ===
Round	Date	Opponent	H/A	Score	ICT Scorer(s)	Attendance
R1	17 December	Queen of the South	H	1–2	McAllister	1,100

== Hat-tricks ==
Player	Competition	Score	Opponent	Date
(Scotland) Alan Hercher	Scottish Third Division	5–2	Arbroath	13 August 1994
