= Alan Savage =

Alan Savage may refer to:

- Alan Savage (novelist), pseudonym of the British writer Christopher Robin Nicole
- Alan Savage (football chairman), chairman of Scottish Premier League team Inverness Caledonian Thistle, 2006–2008, 2024–present
