= 1951–52 Dundee United F.C. season =

Dundee United
1951–52 season
- Chairman: J. Johnston-Grant
- Manager: Willie MacFadyen
- Stadium: Tannadice Park
- Scottish Second Division: 4th W16 D5 L9 F75 A60 P37
- Scottish Cup: Round 3
- League Cup: Group stage
- Supplementary Cup: Round 1

The 1951–52 season was the 44th year of football played by Dundee United, and covers the period from 1 July 1951 to 30 June 1952. United finished in fifteenth place in the Second Division.

== Match results ==
Dundee United played a total of 41 competitive matches during the 1951–52 season.

=== Legend ===
Win
Draw
Loss

All results are written with Dundee United's score first. Own goals in italics

=== Division B ===
Date	Opponent	Venue	Result	Attendance	Scorers
8 September 1951	Alloa Athletic	H	4–1	7,500	
15 September 1951	Queen's Park	A	2–1	5,391	
22 September 1951	St Johnstone	H	4–3	12,000	
29 September 1951	Cowdenbeath	A	0–0	3,500	
6 October 1951	Hamilton Academical	H	3–2	10,000	
13 October 1951	Forfar Athletic	A	3–3	5,000	
20 October 1951	Ayr United	A	0–2	6,500	
27 October 1951	Clyde	H	3–5	9,000	
3 November 1951	Falkirk	A	0–6	8,000	
10 November 1951	Kilmarnock	H	1–0	2,200	
17 November 1951	Stenhousemuir	A	2–6	1,000	
24 November 1951	Dunfermline Athletic	H	2–1	8,000	
1 December 1951	Arbroath	A	3–1	2,400	
8 December 1951	Albion Rovers	A	0–3	1,500	
15 December 1951	Dumbarton	H	4–1	8,000	
22 December 1951	Alloa Athletic	A	3–2	3,500	
29 December 1951	Queen's Park	H	5–0	8,500	
1 January 1952	St Johnstone	A	1–4	8,000	
2 January 1952	Cowdenbeath	H	5–1	9,000	
5 January 1952	Hamilton Academical	A	1–1	4,000	
12 January 1952	Forfar Athletic	H	8–1	10,000	
19 January 1952	Ayr United	H	2–2	18,000	
16 February 1952	Kilmarnock	A	6–2	10,116	
1 March 1952	Dunfermline Athletic	A	2–1	4,500	
5 March 1952	Stenhousemuir	H	3–0	3,000	
8 March 1952	Arbroath	H	3–1	6,500	
11 March 1952	Clyde	A	0–3	4,000	
15 March 1952	Albion Rovers	H	0–0	6,500	
22 March 1952	Dumbarton	A	1–2	2,000	
14 April 1952	Falkirk	H	2–3	6,000	

=== Scottish Cup ===
Date	Rd	Opponent	Venue	Result	Attendance	Scorers
26 January 1952	R1	Inverness Caledonian	A	3–3	7,000	
30 January 1952	R1 R	Inverness Caledonian	H	4–0	8,500	
9 February 1952	R2	Leith Athletic	A	4–1	9,250	
23 February 1952	R3	Aberdeen	H	2–2	26,407	
27 February 1952	R3 R	Aberdeen	A	2–3	27,000	

=== League Cup ===
Date	Rd	Opponent	Venue	Result	Attendance	Scorers
11 August 1951	G6	Cowdenbeath	H	1–1	11,000	
15 August 1951	G6	Stenhousemuir	A	1–1	1,500	
18 August 1951	G6	Falkirk	A	0–3	7,000	
25 August 1951	G6	Cowdenbeath	A	0–2	3,000	
29 August 1951	G6	Stenhousemuir	H	4–2	10,000	
1 September 1951	G6	Falkirk	H	0–1	10,000	

=== Supplementary Cup ===
Date	Rd	Opponent	Venue	Result	Attendance	Scorers
29 March 1952	R1	Dumbarton	A	0–1		

== See also ==
- 1951–52 in Scottish football
