= Stuart Garden =

Scottish footballer and coach

Personal information
- Full name: Stuart Robertson Garden
- Date of birth: 10 February 1972 (age 54)
- Place of birth: Dundee, Scotland
- Height: 6 ft 0 in (1.83 m)
- Position: Goalkeeper

Youth career
- Dundee North End

Senior career*
Years	Team	Apps	(Gls)
1993–1995	Dundee United	0	(0)
1995–1999	Brechin City	93	(0)
1999–2001	Forfar Athletic	68	(0)
2001–2004	Notts County	52	(0)
2004–2006	Ross County	41	(0)
2011–2012	Montrose	0	(0)

Managerial career
- 2012–2014: Montrose
- * Club domestic league appearances and goals

Stuart Robertson Garden (born 10 February 1972 in Dundee) is a Scottish football player and coach. He played as a goalkeeper for Dundee United, Brechin City, Forfar Athletic, Notts County and Ross County.

Garden was appointed Montrose manager in May 2012, after Ray Farningham left the club. Garden left Montrose by mutual consent in April 2014, after a defeat by Peterhead meant that the club could no longer qualify for the end of season promotion play-offs.

Garden joined Airdrie in October 2014 to work as a goalkeeping coach. He joined Dundee United in the same role in October 2015, and departed in May 2018. Hibernian appointed Garden in July 2022 to a goalkeeper coaching position, which he left in September 2023. He joined Inverness Caledonian Thistle in June 2024 but left in October that year after the club had entered administration.

== Managerial statistics ==
As of 06:12, 1 November 2014 (UTC)

Team	Nat	From	To	Record				
Team	Nat	From	To	G	W	D	L	Win %
Montrose	(Scotland)	May 2012	April 2014	77	26	20	31	33.77

== Honours ==
=== Personal ===
- Scottish Football League Third Division - Manager of the Month, November 2012
