= Frank Gilfeather =

Scottish journalist and broadcaster

Frank Gilfeather (born 30 December 1945, Lochee, Dundee, Scotland) is a Scottish journalist and broadcaster.

Gilfeather, a former Scottish amateur boxing champion from Dundee, moved to Aberdeen in April 1969 and began work on the Press & Journal and the Evening Express as a general news reporter. Later, when personnel was allocated to each paper, he was a news reporter on the P&J for some years before moving to the evening newspaper's sports desk as chief sportswriter and deputy sports editor.

His broadcasting career began in 1980 with the launch of the Grampian Television (now STV North) regional news programme, North Tonight. Gilfeather joined the programme as a sports correspondent, although he later worked on news coverage. As well as reporting for North Tonight, Gilfeather fronted the North Tonight spin-off Summer at Six and local quiz show Top Club which ran for nine years. He also worked on general election coverage for ITN and has been featured in out-takes on LWT's It'll be Alright on the Night.

Gilfeather also fronted STV and Grampian TV's shinty highlights coverage between the mid-1980s and early-1990s, for which the shinty matches were simiculast on both channels throughout this time.

Gilfeather is a freelance journalist and broadcaster and writes for several national newspapers, including The Times, the Daily Record, The Herald and the Sunday Herald. He wrote a weekly current affairs column for the Evening Express from 2001. In October 2021 Gilfeather ceased to write for the Evening Express because he had refused to retract misogynistic comments made in his column; he had said that women did not take responsibility for preventing their drinks from being spiked and subsequently being assaulted.

He covers football for Soccer Saturday on Sky Sports.

His play The Harp and the Violet, based upon a real-life incident in Dundee in May 1941, was given its first performance at Dundee Repertory Theatre in November 1991. It was directed by Robert Robertson and designed by Monika Nisbet. The cast included Martin McCardie [Frank McGarrity], Carol Brannan [Bridget McGarrity], Frank Ellis [L/Cpl. Bert Leitch] and Martyn James [Gino Esposito].

In November 2009, his first book - Confessions of a Highland Hero - a ghost-written autobiography of Steve Paterson, the former Inverness Caledonian Thistle and Aberdeen football manager - was published by Birlinn.

In 2010, Birlinn published Gilfeather's second book - Ross County: From Highland League To Hampden. The book charted the Highland League side's history and the Scottish Cup run of 2009–10, during which they dumped Celtic and Hibs out of the competition before falling to Dundee United in the final.
