= Scott Kellacher =

Scottish footballer and manager

Personal information
- Full name: Scott Mackenzie Kellacher
- Date of birth: 5 December 1980 (age 45)
- Place of birth: Inverness, Scotland

Team information
- Current team: Inverness Caledonian Thistle (Head Coach)

Youth career
- –1997: Celtic Boys Club

Senior career*
Years	Team	Apps	(Gls)
1997–1999	Celtic	0	(0)
1999	→ Inverness Caledonian Thistle (loan)	0	(0)
1999–2000	Inverness Caledonian Thistle	0	(0)
2000–2008	Nairn County	101	(45)
2007	→ Elgin City (loan)	1	(0)
2008–2010	Clachnacuddin		

Managerial career
- 2013: Inverness Caledonian Thistle (interim)
- 2024–: Inverness Caledonian Thistle
- * Club domestic league appearances and goals

Scott Mackenzie Kellacher (born 5 December 1980) is a Scottish former footballer and is currently the manager of Scottish Championship side Inverness Caledonian Thistle.

== Personal life and playing career ==
Kellacher was born in Inverness on 5 December 1980. In the 1990s, Kellacher joined Celtic Boys Club before being promoted to the senior team in 1997, where he failed to make an appearance, before joining hometown team, Inverness Caledonian Thistle in 1999, initially on loan before joining permanently in the summer window on a 1-year deal. Failing to break into the first team at Inverness, Kellagher joined Highland League side Nairn County, where he stayed until 2007 when he joined Third Division side, Elgin City for a brief loan spell where he made 1 substitute appearance, before returning to Nairn for another year. In 2008, Kellacher returned to Inverness, this time for Clachnacuddin, where he stayed for 2 years before officially hanging up his boots in 2010.

In 2021, Kellacher was hospitalised after contracting both COVID-19 and viral encephalitis, requiring him to be placed on oxygen for several days.

== Managerial career ==
Kellacher started his managerial career whilst he was still playing for Nairn County, managing Inverness Caledonian Thistle's Under 20s side, from 2006 to 2009, when he was briefly made redundant when Inverness were relegated from the Premier League, before rejoining the role following their promotion in 2010, and remaining with the club until he was promoted to the role of assistant manager in 2018, where he served beside John Robertson, Neil McCann, Billy Dodds, and Duncan Ferguson.

In October 2024, following Inverness going into administration and the sacking of Duncan Ferguson, Kellacher was given the role as head coach, with club record goalscorer, captain, and reserves coach, Billy Mckay being given the assistant manager role. His first game in charge, coming less than 3 days after his appointment, was a 3–1 away loss to Dumbarton. On 9 November 2024, Kellacher secured his first win as Inverness boss, with a 2–1 win away to Cove Rangers, bringing Inverness back into positive points following their 15-point deduction for entering administration. After taking 7 points out of possible 9 against Kelty Hearts, Cove and Alloa Athletic in November, Kellacher won the League One manager of the month award.

After winning four of their opening five league games the following season and climbing up to 4th in the table despite a five point deduction, Kellacher won the League One manager of the month award for August. In October, Kellacher followed this up with September's League One manager of the month award, with a 100% record for the month, and having conceded only 3 goals across all competitions. After missing out on October's award to Stenhousemuir's Gary Naysmith, Kellacher picked up Manager of the Month award for November, his third title of the season, having gone unbeaten winning 10 of a possible 12 points.

=== Managerial record ===
As of match played 20 November 2026

Team	From	To	Record				
Team	From	To	G	W	D	L	Win %
Inverness Caledonian Thistle	23 October 2024	Present	101	55	24	22	54.46
Total			101	55	24	22	54.46

== Honours ==
=== Manager ===
Inverness Caledonian Thistle

- Scottish League One: 2025–26
- Scottish Challenge Cup runner-up: 2025–26
