= Top Club =

Scottish TV game show (1971–1998)

- Also known as: Top Team
- Genre: Game show (regional)
- Presented by: Jimmy Spankie (1971–1983); Jimmy Mack (1984); Frank Gilfeather (1989–1998)
- Country of origin: Scotland

Production
- Running time: 30 minutes
- Production company: Grampian Television

Original release
- Network: Grampian Television
- Release: 29 July 1971 – 15 July 1998

Top Club is a Scottish regional television game show produced by Grampian Television (now STV North) between 1971 and 1998.

== History ==
Top Club was an annual tournament of general knowledge quiz games involving clubs and organisations from the Northern Scotland region. The programme was the most watched regional light entertainment programme on the ITV network, winning audience shares of up to 46%.

Initially broadcast until 1974 as Top Team, the programme was axed in 1984 before being revived in 1989 with new presenter Frank Gilfeather, who continued until the series was axed for a second time in 1998. Future UK cabinet minister Michael Gove appeared on the show in 1990 as part of a team of journalists who were on strike at the time.
