= 1997–98 Scottish Second Division =

Scottish Second Division
- Season: 1997–98
- Champions: Stranraer
- Promoted: Stranraer; Clydebank
- Relegated: Stenhousemuir; Brechin City

The 1997–98 Scottish Second Division was won by Stranraer who, along with second placed Clydebank, were promoted to the First Division. Stenhousemuir and Brechin City were relegated to the Third Division.

== Table ==
Pos	Team	Pld	W	D	L	GF	GA	GD	Pts	Promotion or relegation
1	Stranraer (C, P)	36	18	7	11	62	44	+18	61	Promotion to the First Division
2	Clydebank (P)	36	16	12	8	48	31	+17	60	Promotion to the First Division
3	Livingston	36	16	11	9	56	40	+16	59	
4	Queen of the South	36	15	9	12	57	51	+6	54	
5	Inverness CT	36	13	10	13	65	51	+14	49	
6	East Fife	36	14	6	16	51	59	−8	48	
7	Forfar Athletic	36	12	10	14	51	61	−10	46	
8	Clyde	36	10	12	14	40	53	−13	42	
9	Stenhousemuir (R)	36	10	10	16	44	53	−9	40	Relegation to the Third Division
10	Brechin City (R)	36	7	11	18	42	73	−31	32	Relegation to the Third Division

Source: "1997-1998 Second Division - SPFL Archive". SPFL (in Malay).
Rules for classification: 1) points; 2) goal difference; 3) number of goals scored.
(C) Champions; (P) Promoted; (R) Relegated

== Top scorers ==
P	Name	Goals
1	(Scotland) Iain Stewart (Inverness CT)	16
2	(Scotland) Graham Harvey (Livingston)	15
=	(Scotland) Ian Little (Stenhousemuir)	15
4	(Scotland) Martin McLauchan (Forfar Athletic)	14
5	(Scotland) Colin McDonald (Clydebank)	13
=	(Scotland) B Thomson (Inverness CT)	13
7	(Australia) Ben Honeyman (Forfar Athletic)	12
8	(Scotland) Tommy Bryce (Queen of the South)	11
=	(Scotland) Matthew Dyer (East Fife)	11
=	(Scotland) Gordon Young (Stranraer)	11
