= Graeme Bennett =

Scottish former football midfielder (born 1965)

Personal information
- Date of birth: May 7, 1965 (age 61)

Graeme Bennett (born 7 May 1965) is a Scottish former football midfielder. Now retired, he held the position of Director of football at Inverness Caledonian Thistle F.C.

As a player the combative Bennett made his Scottish Football League debut for the newly created Inverness club in their first season in existence. He eventually left the club to become player-manager of Clachnacuddin F.C. and concentrate on his double glazing firm but soon returned in the director's role. Although overseeing a fairly regular turnover of men in the managerial role, Bennett has been constant in the director's role since the days of Steve Paterson.

Bennett also held the position of vice-chairman of the club. Following the club's relegation in 2009 his director of football role became unsalaried as the club made a series a cost-cutting measures.
