= Paul Cherry =

English footballer (born 1964)

Personal information
- Full name: Paul Robert Cherry
- Date of birth: 14 October 1964 (age 62)
- Place of birth: Derby, England
- Position: Midfielder

Youth career
- ?–1983: Salvesen Boys Club

Senior career*
Years	Team	Apps	(Gls)
1983–1986	Hearts	8	(0)
1986–1988	Cowdenbeath	70	(13)
1988–1996	St Johnstone	213	(12)
1996–1999	Inverness Caledonian Thistle	89	(12)
1999–?	Newburgh		
Total		380	(37)
- * Club domestic league appearances and goals

Paul Robert Cherry (born 14 October 1964) is an Anglo-Scottish former professional footballer who played as a midfielder. Born in England, he grew up in Edinburgh and played the entirety of his career in Scotland.

== Career ==
Cherry began his career at Hearts in 1983. Three years later, after making only a handful of appearances for the Jambos, he moved to Cowdenbeath. The deal did not involve a cash transaction but witnessed the Blue Brazil relinquish their rights to a future sell-on fee for Craig Levein, whom they had sold to Hearts in 1983.

After making 70 appearances and scoring 13 goals for Cowden, Cherry signed for Alex Totten's St Johnstone. He remained at Muirton Park, firstly, and then McDiarmid Park, for eight years, clocking up over 200 league appearances. He played under two other managers during his time in Perth - John McClelland and Paul Sturrock.

In 1996, Cherry joined Inverness Caledonian Thistle, where he saw out the remainder of his professional career.

He moved into junior football in 1999 with Newburgh.

== Post-retirement ==
Cherry set up the Scottish subsidiary of Stellar Group, a sports management consultancy, with fellow ex-Saint Allan Preston. Stellar Scotland's first major move was assisting in the transfer of John Hartson from Coventry City to Celtic in 2001.

Cherry later formed Independent Financial Services Company, which was based in Perth. The business was sold to Stubbs Insurance Services in 2008.

In 2005, Cherry and his wife Nicola set up the Spanish Estate Agency Chersun, which is based in Murcia, Spain.
