= Mark McAllister =

Scottish footballer

Personal information
- Date of birth: 13 February 1971 (age 55)
- Place of birth: Inverness, Scotland
- Position: Defender

Senior career*
Years	Team	Apps	(Gls)
1988–1994	Caledonian	138	(9)
1994–1996	Inverness Caledonian Thistle	61	(6)
1995	→ Bolton Wanderers (loan)	1	(0)
1996–1998	Dulwich Hamlet	38	(4)
1998–1999	Fisher Athletic	35	(2)
Total		273	(21)
- * Club domestic league appearances and goals

Mark McAllister (born 13 February 1971 in Inverness) is a former professional footballer who played for Inverness Caledonian Thistle in the Scottish League.

== Early career ==
McAllister is the son of former Press and Journal editor Bill McAllister. He began his career playing in the Highland League for Caledonian in 1988 at the age of 17. As a left back, McAllister was known for his forward runs and combative tackling as well as scoring important goals and spent a short spell at Reading under manager Ian Branfoot.

== Inverness Caledonian Thistle ==
In 1994, when Caledonian and Inverness Thistle merged to form Inverness Caledonian Thistle, McAllister was automatically transferred to the new club from Caledonian. Initially he played as a left wing-back before adopting a central defender role under the management of former Soviet Union and Dynamo Kiev player Sergei Baltacha.

McAllister made 138 appearances for Inverness Caledonian and scored 9 goals.

During the club's inaugural season, McAllister made 39 out of a possible 40 appearances and was presented with both the Supporters Player of the Year and the Players' Player of the Year trophies. In the club's second season, under the management of former Manchester United player, Steve Paterson, McAllister became the first Inverness Caledonian Thistle player to achieve 50 first team appearances in the Scottish League

McAllister also holds the accolade of scoring the club's first ever Scottish Cup goal against Queen of the South on 17 December 1994 at Telford Street Park.

Following a spell at Bolton Wanderers, McAllister returned to Inverness Caledonian Thistle to continue his career in Scotland.

In 1996, McAllister relocated to London and continued his playing career with Dulwich Hamlet in the Premier Division of the Isthmian League for 2 seasons, followed by Fisher Athletic for one year in the Southern League Premier Division.

McAllister retired at the end of the 2000 season.

== Honours ==
- Inverness Cup winners medal 1988-89
- Scottish Qualifying Cup winners medal 1991-92
- North of Scotland League Cup winners medal 1993-94
