= Inverness Cup =

- Founded: 1895
- Region: Inverness FA
- Current champions: Inverness CT (8th title) (2023–24)
- Most championships: Inverness Thistle; Caledonian (19 titles each)

The Inverness Cup is a football competition for teams around Inverness in the Scottish Highlands. Originally, it was contested by the four Inverness based teams: Caledonian, Citadel, Clachnacuddin and Thistle, but became an invitational tournament to increase the number of clubs competing.

Interest in the tournament eventually diminished, with competition from the Highland League Cup and North of Scotland Cup, along with fixture congestion for Inverness CT, Ross County and Elgin City, who were now playing in the SPFL.

Although the competition was never formally discontinued, it hadn't been contested since 2005–06, other than a one-off revival between Clachnacuddin and Inverness Caledonian Thistle in the 2023–24 season

== Winners ==
Season	Winner
1895–96	Caledonian
1896–97	Caledonian
1897–98	Clachnacuddin
1898–99	Caledonian
1899–1900	Caledonian
1900–01	Clachnacuddin
1901–02	Caledonian
1902–03	Inverness Citadel
1903–04	Clachnacuddin
1904–05	Clachnacuddin
1905–06	Inverness Thistle
1906–07	Clachnacuddin
1907–08	Caledonian
1908–09	Inverness Thistle
1909–10	Clachnacuddin
1910–11	Caledonian
1911–12	Caledonian
1912–13	Caledonian
1913–14	Caledonian
1914–15	No Competition
1915–16	No Competition
1916–17	No Competition
1917–18	No Competition
1918–19	No Competition
1919–20	Clachnacuddin
1920–21	Caledonian
1921–22	Clachnacuddin
1922–23	Caledonian
1923–24	Clachnacuddin
1924–25	Inverness Thistle
1925–26	Caledonian
1926–27	Inverness Thistle
1927–28	Inverness Thistle
1928–29	Clachnacuddin
1929–30	Clachnacuddin
1930–31	Ross County
1931–32	Inverness Citadel
1932–33	Inverness Thistle
1933–34	Inverness Thistle
1934–35	Inverness Thistle
1935–36	Inverness Thistle
1936–37	Clachnacuddin
1937–38	Elgin City
1938–39	Inverness Thistle
1939–40	No Competition
1940–41	No Competition
1941–42	No Competition
1942–43	No Competition
1943–44	No Competition
1944–45	No Competition
1945–46	No Competition
1946–47	No Competition
1947–48	No Competition
1948–49	No Competition
1949–50	No Competition
1950–51	No Competition
1951–52	Clachnacuddin
1952–53	Clachnacuddin
1953–54	Inverness Thistle
1954–55	No Competition
1955–56	No Competition
1956–57	No Competition
1957–58	No Competition
1958–59	No Competition
1959–60	Ross County
1960–61	No Competition
1961–62	No Competition
1962–63	No Competition
1963–64	Caledonian
1964–65	Ross County
1965–66	No Competition
1966–67	Ross County
1967–68	No Competition
1968–69	No Competition
1969–70	No Competition
1970–71	Elgin City
1971–72	No Competition
1972–73	No Competition
1973–74	Inverness Thistle
1974–75	No Competition
1975–76	Inverness Thistle
1976–77	Caledonian
1977–78	Nairn County
1978–79	Ross County
1979–80	Ross County
1980–81	Inverness Thistle
1981–82	Inverness Thistle
1982–83	Caledonian
1983–84	Inverness Thistle
1984–85	Caledonian
1985–86	Forres Mechanics
1986–87	Caledonian
1987–88	Inverness Thistle
1988–89	Caledonian
1989–90	Forres Mechanics
1990–91	Inverness Thistle
1991–92	Ross County
1992–93	Ross County
1993–94	Inverness Thistle
1994–95	Brora Rangers
1995–96	Inverness Caledonian Thistle
1996–97	Inverness Caledonian Thistle
1997–98	Inverness Caledonian Thistle
1998–99	Inverness Caledonian Thistle
1999–2000	Inverness Caledonian Thistle
2000–01	Ross County
2001–02	Inverness Caledonian Thistle
2002–03	Ross County
2003–04	Ross County
2004–05	Inverness Caledonian Thistle
2005–06	Forres Mechanics
2006–07	Competition unfinished
2007–08	No Competition
2008–09	No Competition
2009–10	No Competition
2010–11	No Competition
2011–12	No Competition
2012–13	No Competition
2013–14	No Competition
2014–15	No Competition
2015–16	No Competition
2016–17	No Competition
2017–18	No Competition
2018–19	No Competition
2019–20	No Competition
2020–21	No Competition
2021–22	No Competition
2022–23	No Competition
2023–24	Inverness Caledonian Thistle
2024–25	No Competition
2025–26	No Competition

Club	Wins	Last win
Inverness Thistle	19	1993–94
Caledonian	19	1988–89
Clachnacuddin	14	1952–53
Ross County	11	2003–04
Inverness Caledonian Thistle	8	2023–24
Forres Mechanics	3	2005–06
Elgin City	2	1970–71
Inverness Citadel	2	1931–32
Brora Rangers	1	1994–95
Nairn County	1	1977–78
