= Charlie Christie =

Scottish footballer and coach

Personal information
- Date of birth: 30 March 1966 (age 60)
- Place of birth: Inverness, Scotland
- Positions: Striker; midfielder

Senior career*
| Years | Team | Apps | (Gls) |
| 1983–1985 | Caledonian | | |
| 1985–1987 | Inverness Thistle | | |
| 1987–1989 | Celtic | 0 | (0) |
| 1989–1994 | Caledonian | | |
| 1994–2004 | Inverness Caledonian Thistle | 257 | (32) |
| Total | | 257+ | (32+) |

Managerial career
- 2006–2007: Inverness Caledonian Thistle
- 2023: Inverness Caledonian Thistle (interim)
- * Club domestic league appearances and goals

Charlie Christie (born 30 March 1966) is a Scottish former professional football player and coach who played as a striker and latterly as a midfielder. He played for Inverness Caledonian Thistle throughout the club's first ten years of existence (1994–2004) which saw three promotions from the old Third Division, to the Scottish Premier League, making over 250 appearances, later managed the club from January 2006 until August 2007 and one game in September 2023 as interim manager after Billy Dodds was sacked. He also played in the Scottish Highland Football League for Caledonian and Inverness Thistle before those clubs merged to become Caledonian Thistle, and was a reserve player at Celtic.

Charlie is the father of Ryan, who also played for Inverness Caledonian Thistle, and plays for Bournemouth and Scotland.

== Playing career ==
Born in Inverness in 1966, Christie began his professional football career in 1983, playing for Caledonian in the Scottish Highland Football League. In 1985 he was transferred to local rivals Inverness Thistle. In September 1987 he signed for Celtic, where he made 56 appearances and scored 25 goals for the reserve team. He was unable to break into the Celtic first team, partly due to the performances of Frank McAvennie, who played in the same striker position. Christie rejoined Caledonian in 1989, in the combined role of player and commercial manager.

In 1994, when Inverness Thistle and Caledonian merged to form Inverness Caledonian Thistle, Christie joined the new club, where he combined his playing role with running the Centenary Club lottery. Initially he played as a striker, before eventually moving back to a midfield role. He was the only player to play for Caley Thistle during all of the club's first ten seasons and played in many of the club's most memorable games during this period, including the 3-1 Scottish Cup defeat of Celtic on 8 February 2000, his performance in this game earning him the sponsor's Man of the Match award.

During later seasons, Christie combined his playing career with a role as a club coach. He retired from playing in May 2004, having made a total of 314 appearances and scoring 34 goals.

== Coaching and management career ==
After retiring as a player, Christie continued in his role as a youth development coach at Caley Thistle. In November 2004, when then-manager John Robertson left Caley Thistle to become manager of Hearts, Christie assisted the club's Director of football Graeme Bennett in managing the team until a replacement could be found. When Craig Brewster joined as player-manager Christie was made first team coach and continued in this role until January 2006.

When Brewster left the club on 13 January 2006, Christie was appointed caretaker manager. On 27 January 2006 he was given the manager's job on a permanent basis, with Donald Park as his assistant. Christie made Ross County midfielder John Rankin his first signing as Caley Thistle manager with a fee of £65,000 paid to their Highland neighbours. The deal also smashed Caley Thistle's previous record transfer fee paid to Highland League Club, Lossiemouth FC. of £35,000 for striker Ian Stewart. Christie remained in the job for nearly nineteen months before his resignation in August 2007.

Christie has been involved in Inverness Caledonian Thistle's academy since 2009, taking on the role as head of youth development.

In August 2024, following the sacking of CEO Scot Gardiner, Christie was named as Interim CEO by club benefactor, Alan Savage, whilst finances were levelled out and a suitable investor was found to take over the club.

== Honours ==
Caledonian

- Highland League: 1983–84
- North of Scotland Cup: 1983–84, 1993–94

Inverness Caledonian Thistle

- Scottish Third Division: 1996-97
- Scottish Challenge Cup: 2003-04
- Scottish First Division: 2003-04
