= Alan Savage (football chairman) =

Scottish businessman

Alan Savage (born July 1950) is an English businessman and football executive, best known for his tenure as chairman of Inverness Caledonian Thistle from 2006 until 2008. He is also chairman of Orion Group, an Inverness-based engineering recruitment business.

== Business and football ==
Alan Savage is originally from Manchester and in 1980 moved from Warrington to Scotland, to Ardersier near Inverness. He and his wife Linda founded the company Orion Group. It was founded in 1987 and by 2008 had a turnover of £287 million.

Savage served as chairman of Inverness Caledonian Thistle F.C. from 2006 until 2008, when he resigned due to being unable to commit sufficient time to the club. Savage provided the finance necessary to sign Romanian international Marius Niculae, and Savage's departure meant that Inverness could no longer afford the player.

In 2024, Savage announced he would help finance ailing Scottish League One side, Inverness Caledonian Thistle's Youth Academy, saying the club was fighting a slow slide towards Administration. In August 2024, Savage took charge of the club in its entirety. He had over £1 Million worth of debts written off, before opening the club to bidders for a financial takeover.

In October 2024 the club set up the crowdfunding page "Save ICT Fund" which needed £200,000 in two weeks and 1.4 million to last the rest of the season. The club only recorded £87,000 and went into administration on 22 October, becoming the first side to enter administration in the SPFL era. Savage said he was confident the club could avoid relegation to League Two. On 5 June 2025, with the club safe from relegation, it was announced that Alan Savage had acquired the necessary shares to take Inverness out of Administration and secure the club's future.

== Politics and charity ==
In December 2013 Savage donated £150,000 to the anti-Scottish independence group Better Together, stating that "My support for the Better Together campaign is stronger than ever following the publication of a White Paper that does nothing to convince me that independence would be a force for good for Scotland, Scottish people, the Scottish business community and the rest of our friends in the UK." This brings his total donations to £250,000.

On 7 March 2014 it was announced that multi-million pound plans to expand the Highland Hospice in Inverness had been given a massive boost by the businessman who lost his wife to cancer.

The chairman of Inverness's Orion Group, announced his company was donating £1.25 million towards the £4.5 million Project Build Appeal, the largest single donation in the hospice's 25-year history.

== Personal life ==
Savage lost his wife Linda to cancer at 53. After her death he raised money for Marie Curie Cancer Care, taking part in a six-day, 310-mile challenge cycle ride from Prague to Warsaw collecting £20,000 in sponsorship which his firm matched.
