= 1996–97 Scottish Third Division =

Scottish Third Division
- Season: 1996–97
- Champions: Inverness Caledonian Thistle
- Promoted: Inverness Caledonian Thistle; Forfar Athletic
- Relegated: n/a
- Matches: 180
- Goals: 499 (2.77 per match)
- Highest scoring: (8 goals); Ross County 4–4 Montrose (7 December 1996); Forfar Athletic 5–3 Montrose (15 March 1997)
- Longest winning run: 11 games Inverness Caledonian Thistle
- Longest unbeaten run: 22 games Inverness Caledonian Thistle
- Longest winless run: 15 games Cowdenbeath; Montrose
- Longest losing run: 6 games Cowdenbeath; Montrose

The 1996–97 Scottish Football League Third Division was the 3rd season in the format of ten teams in the fourth-tier of Scottish football. The season started on 17 August 1996 and ended on 10 May 1997. Inverness Caledonian Thistle finished top and were promoted alongside runners-up Forfar Athletic. Arbroath finished bottom.

== Teams for 1996–97 ==
Location of teams in 1996–97 Scottish Third Division

Livingston as champions of the previous season were directly promoted to the 1996–97 Scottish Second Division alongside runners-up Brechin City, both spending only one season in the bottom tier of the Scottish Football League. They were replaced by Forfar Athletic and Montrose who finished second bottom and bottom of the 1994–95 Scottish Second Division respectively and relegated straight back down to the Third Division after only a year in the Second Division. During the change of season Caledonian Thistle changed their name to Inverness Caledonian Thistle for the 1996–97 season.

=== Overview ===
Relegated from Second Division to the Third Division

- Forfar Athletic
- Montrose

Promoted from Third Division to the Second Division

- Livingston
- Brechin City

== Stadia and locations ==
Team	Location	Stadium
Albion Rovers	Coatbridge	Cliftonhill
Alloa Athletic	Alloa	Recreation Park
Arbroath	Arbroath	Gayfield Park
Cowdenbeath	Cowdenbeath	Central Park
East Stirlingshire	Falkirk	Firs Park
Forfar Athletic	Forfar	Station Park
Inverness Caledonian Thistle	Inverness	Caledonian Stadium
Montrose	Montrose	Links Park
Queen's Park	Glasgow	Hampden Park
Ross County	Dingwall	Victoria Park

== Table ==
Pos	Team	Pld	W	D	L	GF	GA	GD	Pts	Promotion
1	Inverness Caledonian Thistle (C, P)	36	23	7	6	70	37	+33	76	Promotion to the Second Division
2	Forfar Athletic (P)	36	19	10	7	74	45	+29	67	Promotion to the Second Division
3	Ross County	36	20	7	9	58	41	+17	67	
4	Alloa Athletic	36	16	7	13	50	47	+3	55	
5	Albion Rovers	36	13	10	13	50	47	+3	49	
6	Montrose	36	12	7	17	46	62	−16	43	
7	Cowdenbeath	36	10	9	17	38	51	−13	39	
8	Queen's Park	36	9	9	18	46	59	−13	36	
9	East Stirlingshire	36	8	9	19	36	58	−22	33	
10	Arbroath	36	6	13	17	31	52	−21	31	

Source: Soccerway
Rules for classification: 1) points; 2) goal difference; 3) number of goals scored.
(C) Champions; (P) Promoted
