= Steve Paterson =

Scottish footballer and manager

Personal information
- Full name: Steven William Paterson
- Date of birth: 8 April 1958 (age 68)
- Place of birth: Elgin, Moray, Scotland
- Positions: Defender; striker

Senior career*
Years	Team	Apps	(Gls)
?–1975	Nairn County		
1975–1980	Manchester United	6	(0)
1980	Sheffield United	0	(0)
- Buckie Thistle
- Hong Kong Rangers
- Sydney Olympic
- Yomiuri

Managerial career
- 1988–1990: Elgin City
- 1990–1995: Huntly
- 1995–2002: Inverness Caledonian Thistle
- 2002–2004: Aberdeen
- 2004–2006: Forres Mechanics
- 2006–2008: Peterhead
- 2010–2011: Huntly
- 2011–2015: Formartine United
- 2016–2017: Dufftown
- * Club domestic league appearances and goals

Steven William Paterson (born 8 April 1958) is a Scottish football manager and former player.

Nicknamed "Pele", after six first team games for Manchester United, his career was curtailed due an injury in a pre-season game after transferring to Sheffield United. Despite this and problems as well as a long-term gambling and alcohol addiction, he did have a footballing career with spells in Hong Kong, Australia and Japan where in 1983 he was the first overseas player to play there.

Paterson has had more success as a manager, winning several competitions in the Highland League with several clubs and his 7-year spell at Inverness Caledonian Thistle leading them from the Scottish Third Division to the Scottish First Division and a cup upset over Celtic.

He has also published an autobiography "Confessions of a Highland Hero" ghost-written by Frank Gilfeather which documents his career and battles with gambling and alcohol addictions which were brought to media attention during his ill-fated spell at Aberdeen.

In addition to his football career, Paterson is also a qualified social worker.

== Playing career ==
During his professional playing career, Paterson played as a central defender and joined Manchester United from Highland League club Nairn County in July 1975. He made a total of six league appearances (and 10 overall in all competitions) for the Red Devils over five seasons. He signed for Sheffield United in a £60,000 deal but an ankle injury sustained in pre-season training forced Paterson to retire. Paterson made his comeback as a player in July 1981 with Highland League club Buckie Thistle. He turned down Dundee United to join Peterhead. He had a spell playing for Hong Kong Rangers before again returning to his roots with Highland League club Nairn County in August 1982. The following February, he rejoined former boss Tommy Docherty at Sydney Olympic and then moved on to become the first European to play in Japan in December 1983. He won cups and titles with Yomiuri before his playing career was again cut short by persistent injury problems.

Paterson was a Scotland youth internationalist. He debuted for the under-18s against England at Old Trafford at 15 years old.

== Managerial career ==
=== Elgin City ===
His management career began in 1988 in the Highland League with Elgin City. Primarily a player-manager in his first season, Paterson had a successful stint at Borough Briggs winning the Highland League, the North of Scotland Cup twice and the Northern version of the Scottish Qualifying Cup. He left the club in 1990 due to a contract disagreement with regards to wages.

=== Huntly ===
He immediately moved on to Highland League rivals Huntly and his managerial success continued over the next five years. He won the Highland League twice and a host of other silverware including the Aberdeenshire Cup, the Northern version of the Scottish Qualifying Cup and the Highland League Cup. He also masterminded a Scottish Cup upset at Scottish Third Division club Dumbarton.

=== Inverness Caledonian Thistle ===
In the summer of 1995 he joined Inverness Caledonian Thistle, who were playing in the Scottish Third Division at that time. Paterson spent seven and a half years at Caley Thistle, their longest-serving manager to date. During this time, he took the club from the Third Division to the First Division and presided over the team's famous victories against Celtic (resulting in the well-known newspaper headline "Super Caley Go Ballistic, Celtic Are Atrocious") and Hearts in the Scottish Cup.

In November 2002, Paterson was strongly linked with the vacant manager's job at Dundee United, but he stayed at Caley Thistle for another month.

=== Aberdeen ===
He was offered the manager's position at Aberdeen and became the club's new boss on 11 December 2002. This move was not without controversy, as Paterson and his assistant Duncan Shearer were each supposed to have agreed a five-year contract with Caley Thistle not long before their departure to the Dons.

Paterson's tenure with Aberdeen was marred by his abuse of alcohol. In March 2003 he failed to attend a home game against Dundee due to being too hungover, after binge drinking the night before the match.

Paterson and Shearer left Aberdeen in the summer of 2004, after a campaign in which the club came dangerously close to being relegated. He did however win a couple of Aberdeenshire Cup titles during his tenure.

=== Forres Mechanics ===
In the same year he returned to the Highland League with Forres Mechanics where they returned to successful ways winning both the North of Scotland Cup and Inverness Cup.

=== Peterhead ===
On 30 October 2006, he returned to the Scottish Football League when he was announced as the new manager of Peterhead, a position from which he was eventually dismissed on 10 January 2008.

=== Return to Huntly ===
In 2010, he returned to the Highland League with a second spell at Christie Park but his return was brief and not as successful as his first.

=== Formartine United ===
In March 2011, Paterson left his post at Huntly to take up the managers post at Formartine United. He added to his trophy haul with success in the Aberdeenshire Cup in 2013– 14.

Also that season, United became the first Highland League club to win a Scottish Challenge Cup match in July 2013. They dispatched two SPFL teams East Stirling and Elgin City to reach the quarter finals

Paterson left Formartine United in summer 2015.

=== Dufftown ===
On 9 December 2015, it was announced that Paterson had agreed to become manager of North Region junior side Dufftown.

== Personal life ==
In March 2003, Paterson revealed he had an alcohol problem, after missing Aberdeen's 3–3 home draw with Dundee due to being too hungover to attend. In October 2008 it was reported that Paterson had lost £1 million from betting. Paterson's biography "Confessions of a Highland Hero" co-written with former Grampian Television presenter Frank Gilfeather was published in November 2009, and was serialised in the Daily Record.

== Managerial statistics ==
As of 10 May 2015

Team	Nat	From	To	Record				
Team	Nat	From	To	G	W	D	L	Win %
Inverness Caledonian Thistle	(Scotland)	August 1995	December 2002	329	147	92	90	44.68
Aberdeen	(Scotland)	December 2002	May 2004	68	23	13	32	33.82
Peterhead	(Scotland)	October 2006	January 2008	51	17	10	24	33.33

- Scottish Football League statistics only.

== Honours ==
=== Player ===
Yomiuri

- Japan Soccer League: 1984
- Emperor's Cup: 1984
- Xerox Super Cup: 1984

=== Manager ===
Elgin City

- Highland League: 1989–90
- Qualifying Cup North: 1989–90
- North of Scotland Cup: 1989–90

Huntly

- Highland League: 1993–94, 1994–95
- Highland League Cup: 1992–93, 1993–94
- Aberdeenshire Cup: 1993–94, 1994–95
- Qualifying Cup North: 1992–93, 1994–95

Inverness CT

- Scottish Second Division: Promoted 1998–99
- Scottish Third Division: 1996–97
- North of Scotland Cup: 1999–2000
- Inverness Cup: 1996–97, 1997–98, 1998–99, 1999–2000, 2001–02

Forres Mechanics

- North of Scotland Cup: 2004–05
- Inverness Cup: 2005–06

Formartine United

- Aberdeenshire Cup: 2013–14

Individual

- SFL Third Division Manager of the Year: 1996–97
