= Davie Ross (Scottish footballer) =

Scottish footballer (born 1951)

Personal information
- Date of birth: 2 May 1951 (age 75)
- Place of birth: Kennoway, Scotland
- Position: Left winger

Senior career*
Years	Team	Apps	(Gls)
–1969	Kennoway United		
- → Forfar Athletic (loan)
1969–1976	Cowdenbeath	223	(48)
1976–1978	St Johnstone	57	(1)
1978–1980	Forfar Athletic	24	(0)
- * Club domestic league appearances and goals

Davie Ross (born 2 May 1951) is a Scottish retired semi-professional footballer who played as a left winger in the Scottish Football League for Cowdenbeath, St Johnstone and Forfar Athletic.

== Career statistics ==
Appearances and goals by club, season and competition
Club	Season	League			FA Cup		League Cup		Total	
Club	Season	Division	Apps	Goals	Apps	Goals	Apps	Goals	Apps	Goals
Forfar Athletic	1978–79	Scottish Second Division	10	0	—		—		10	0
Forfar Athletic	1979–80	Scottish Second Division	14	0	0	0	3	0	17	0
Career total			24	0	0	0	3	0	27	0

== Honours ==
Cowdenbeath

- Scottish League Second Division: 1969–70

Individual

- Cowdenbeath Hall of Fame
