= Brian Thomson (footballer) =

Scottish footballer

Personal information
- Full name: Brian Lamont Thomson
- Date of birth: 1 March 1959 (age 67)
- Place of birth: Paisley, Renfrewshire, Scotland
- Position: Winger

Senior career*
Years	Team	Apps	(Gls)
1975–1976	Morecambe		
1976–1979	West Ham United	0	(0)
1979–1982	Mansfield Town	63	(1)
1982	Corby Town		
1983	King's Lynn		
1984	Boston United		
Total		63	(1)
- * Club domestic league appearances and goals

Brian Lamont Thomson (born 1 March 1959) is a Scottish former professional footballer who played in the Football League for Mansfield Town.
