= Telford Street Park =

Stadium in Highland, Scotland

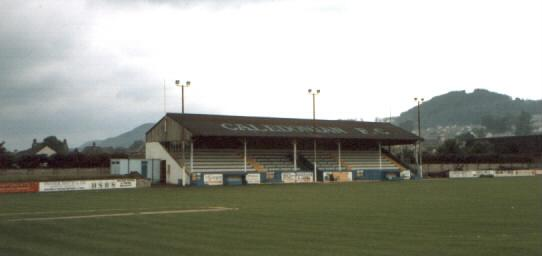

- Location within Inverness area
- Full name: Telford Street Park
- Location: Inverness; Scotland
- Coordinates: 57.4819°N 4.2468°W
- Owner: Caledonian F.C.
- Capacity: 5000 (550 seated)
- Surface: Grass

Construction
- Built: 1926
- Demolished: 1996

Tenants
- Caledonian 1926–1994; Caledonian Thistle 1994–1996

Telford Street Park was a football ground in Inverness, Scotland. It was the home ground of Caledonian F.C. and latterly Caledonian Thistle F.C.

== History ==
Caledonian played at the eponymous Caledonian Park until the mid-1920s, when Telford Street Park was built. A fire destroyed the original stand in 1950, and a new one was built.

A merger between the three Inverness clubs (Caledonian, Clachnacuddin and Thistle), who all played in the Highland Football League, had long been mooted. The proposal gained momentum in 1993, when the Scottish Football League (SFL) announced it would expand its membership by two clubs and would look more favourably on a joint Inverness bid than if each individual club applied. At the same time, Caledonian had received an offer of £750,000 from Texas Homecare for Telford Street Park. The club wanted to replace their ground with a new all-seater stadium that would require government funding, but the authorities indicated their preference for a facility to be used by a merged club.

Despite clear opposition from most of the supporters, the directors of Caledonian and Thistle pressed ahead with a merger proposal. The new club, which was initially called Caledonian Thistle, gained SFL membership in 1994 and played its home games at Telford Street Park. As part of its SFL membership bid, Caledonian Thistle had pledged to find a new ground by August 1995. The league granted an extension to August 1996, as the proposed new site required £900,000 of funding from Inverness District Council. The club threatened to resign from the SFL if the funding was not provided, but it was authorised by a 14-12 majority in December 1995. The new Caledonian Stadium was opened in 1996 and Telford Street Park was demolished to make way for a retail park.

== See also ==
- Stadium relocations in Scottish football
