= Inverness Caledonian Thistle F.C. =

Association football club in Scotland

Inverness Caledonian Thistle
- Full name: Inverness Caledonian Thistle Football Club
- Nicknames: Caley Thistle; Caley Jags; The Pride of the Highlands
- Short name: Inverness CT; ICTFC
- Founded: July 1994; 32 years ago as Caledonian Thistle Football Club
- Ground: Caledonian Stadium
- Capacity: 7,512 (seated)
- Owner: Alan Savage
- Chairman: Alan Savage
- Head coach: Scott Kellacher
- League: Scottish Championship
- 2025–26: Scottish League One, 1st of 10 (promoted)
- Website: ictfc.com
Home colours	Away colours

Inverness Caledonian Thistle Football Club, commonly known as Caley Thistle, Inverness CT or just Inverness, is a professional football club based in Inverness, Scotland. The team competes in the Scottish Championship, the second tier of the Scottish Professional Football League, and plays its home games at Caledonian Stadium.

Inverness Caledonian Thistle won the Scottish Cup in 2015, were runners-up in 2023 and were also runners-up in the Scottish League Cup in 2014. They have also won the Scottish Challenge Cup three times and the Scottish Football League First Division twice. Its highest Premiership position is third in 2014–15.

== History ==
=== Formation and early years ===
Prior to 1994, there were six football clubs in Inverness competing in the Highland League: Clachnacuddin, Caledonian, Inverness Celtic, Inverness Citadel, Inverness Thistle and Inverness Union. Inverness Union, who competed in the Highland League in the late 19th Century, merged with Inverness Thistle in either 1895 or 1899. Inverness Celtic folded in 1898, and Citadel folded in 1937.

The clubs had won a number of local titles, and Inverness Thistle narrowly missed out on being elected into the Scottish League in 1973. In 1993, the Scottish Football League announced a reconstruction of the league setup to 4 leagues of 10 teams, with a new Third Division being created as a result. This, and the fact road links to Inverness had been vastly improved, now meant that competing in national competitions was more possible, and teams would be less reluctant to vote for teams in the Far North of Scotland to join the Football League.

Caledonian Thistle F.C. was formed in July 1994 from the merger of Caledonian and Inverness Thistle (both formed in 1885), with an objective of taking up one of the two available places in the Scottish League. The merger was opposed by some supporters of both clubs, with Caledonian fans staging a number of protests, but the merger went through and the new club was selected to the Scottish Third Division along with fellow Highland team, Ross County.

Following a set of pre-season friendlies against St. Mirren, Bolton Wanderers and Brechin City, Caledonian Thistle started their inaugural season on 9 August 1994, with a 2–0 away win over East Stirlingshire in the League Cup, with goals from Wilson Robertson and Alan Hercher. Caley Thistle kicked off their league campaign against Arbroath on 13 August 1994, which ended in a 5–2 win at Telford Street Park, the former home ground of Caledonian. Alan Hercher scored Caledonian Thistle's first league goal, and went on to complete a hat-trick. The club eventually finished sixth in the Third Division, and followed this up with a third-place finish in 1995–96. Before the start of the 1996–97 season the club changed its name to Inverness Caledonian Thistle Football Club. Part of the application to join the Scottish League was a commitment to move to a new stadium and, a year later than originally planned, Caley moved to the newly built Caledonian Park in November 1996. With a new name and new stadium, the club finished 1996–97 as Third Division champions, earning promotion to the Second Division. The club spent two seasons in the Second Division. After a closely fought campaign, they finished runners-up to Livingston in 1998–99, securing promotion to the First Division.

=== First Division and "Going Ballistic" (1999–2004) ===
The club first came to national prominence after their Scottish Cup victories over Celtic in 2000 and 2003: winning 3–1 at Celtic Park, resulting in the headline "Super Caley Go Ballistic Celtic Are Atrocious" in The Sun which is now framed in the foyer of Caledonian Stadium, and 1–0 in Inverness, courtesy of Dennis Wyness. Inverness also knocked other SPL teams out of cup competitions, including Motherwell and Hearts. Over the first ten years of their existence the club had been responsible for a total of 12 'shocks' and as a result had gained themselves a reputation as being "giant killers". On 25 February 2007, Inverness's run of cup victories over Celtic came to an end following two goals in the last two minutes of their fifth round tie at Caledonian Stadium. Having led 1–0 for the majority of the game thanks to a Graham Bayne goal, Steven Pressley equalised before Kenny Miller netted the winner in stoppage time. However, another victory against Celtic occurred on 16 December 2007, this time in the league, when the team came from being 2–0 down to win 3–2, with goals scored by John Rankin, David Proctor and Don Cowie.

Season 2003–2004 could be regarded as the club's most successful up to that point. In November 2003, they defeated Airdrie United 2–0 with goals from Steve Hislop and David Bingham to win the Scottish Challenge Cup, and also reached the Scottish Cup semi-final, losing a replay 3–2 to Dunfermline Athletic after a 1–1 draw at Hampden Park. However, the greatest achievement was on the final day of the season, when Inverness defeated St Johnstone 3–1, with goals from Paul Ritchie, David Bingham and Barry Wilson and, as a result, pipped Clyde to the First Division title. This made the club eligible for promotion to the Scottish Premier League (SPL). However, SPL rules at that time stated that all member clubs must have a stadium with a minimum capacity of 10,000 seats. Caledonian Stadium did not meet this criterion, leaving the club's Board with a dilemma: either to remain in the First Division (like Falkirk the previous season) or to groundshare with Aberdeen, over 100 miles (160 km) away. After consulting with supporters, the Board decided the 'sacrifice' of one season in Aberdeen would be an acceptable compromise to ensure Premier League participation for the club.

=== 2001 Name Change Ballot ===
Inverness Caledonian Thistle Name Change Ballot
- 27 January 2001
- Votes counted: 100%
- Outcome: Name remains Inverness Caledonian Thistle

Results
Choice	Votes	%
Yes	412	27.86%
No	1,067	72.14%
Total votes	1,479	100.00%

Results
I would like our name to change to Inverness City F.C.	27.86%
I wish our name to remain Inverness Caledonian Thistle F.C.	72.14%

In late January 2001, following Inverness' Scottish Cup match against Ayr United, in which Caley Thistle overturned a 0–3 deficit to win 4–3, fans were asked to fill in a voting card on whether the club should change their name to reflect Inverness's recently granted city status. However, the name change was overwhelmingly rejected by the fans in attendance by 412 to 1,067, mostly on the grounds of the amount of success they had under the Inverness Caledonian Thistle name, namely it being just shy of a year since they had beaten Celtic in the Scottish Cup. The name Inverness City was registered by the club, seemingly in case of a change of heart within the voters, however it was soon dropped when Inverness CT won the Scottish First Division in 2004, and were promoted to the Scottish Premier League. With the name now free to use, in 2006 now defunct local amateur side Inverness City were born, and competed in the lower echelons of the Scottish Football Tier System, playing in the North Caledonian Football League and later the North Junior Superleague, before folding in 2019 due to lack of a home ground.

=== Scottish Premier League (2004–2009) ===
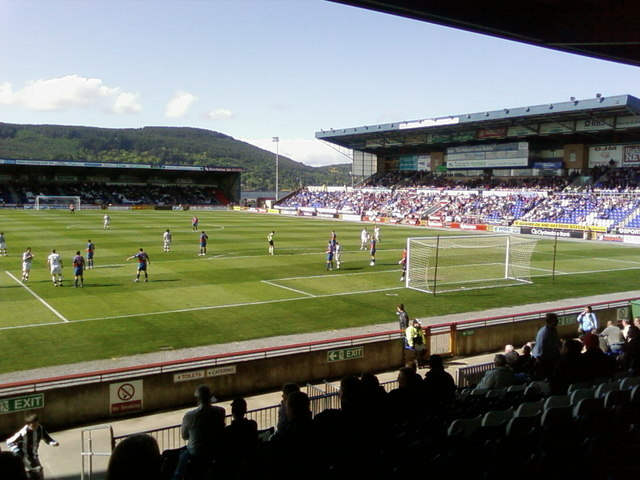
Inverness playing St Mirren in May 2008 at the Caledonian Stadium.

A change in SPL rules during the 2004–05 season reduced the stadium seating requirement to 6,000 seats for SPL membership. The Caledonian Stadium was rendered a valid SPL venue after a rapid ground expansion, with two new stands added. The stadium was renamed as the Tulloch Caledonian Stadium in honour of the local building firm that completed the work in only 47 working days. The chairman of Tulloch, David Sutherland, was also chairman of the club at the time and remains a major shareholder. The club returned to playing in Inverness, defeating Dunfermline 2–0 in their first SPL game in their own ground on 29 January 2005, thanks to goals from Barry Wilson and then player-manager Craig Brewster.

A significant event in the club's history was the signing of Romanian international Marius Niculae. Niculae was involved in the club's 2007–08 campaign and played at UEFA Euro 2008, before leaving for Dinamo București. He later became involved in a dispute with the club over a share of the transfer fee that was not paid to him when he left. As a result, Inverness were ordered by FIFA to pay £133,000 to the player. The club appealed the decision to the Court of Arbitration for Sport, and in November 2011, the club won their appeal.

During season 2008–09 season, the team incurred a number of bad results and struggled near the bottom of the SPL. Eventually, manager Craig Brewster was sacked after a run of seven consecutive defeats, ending with a 1–0 loss to Hamilton Academical. This was the first time the club had sacked a manager, and the fans had previously voiced concern about Brewster's ability. Brewster was replaced by former England international Terry Butcher, who was unable to prevent the club's relegation, despite an initial improvement in results. Inverness Caledonian Thistle's tenure in the SPL eventually ended in May 2009 after suffering a 1–0 home defeat to Falkirk. Their final total of 37 points is the (equal) highest ever for a team finishing bottom of the top-tier in Scottish football.

=== Return to the First Division (2009–2010) ===
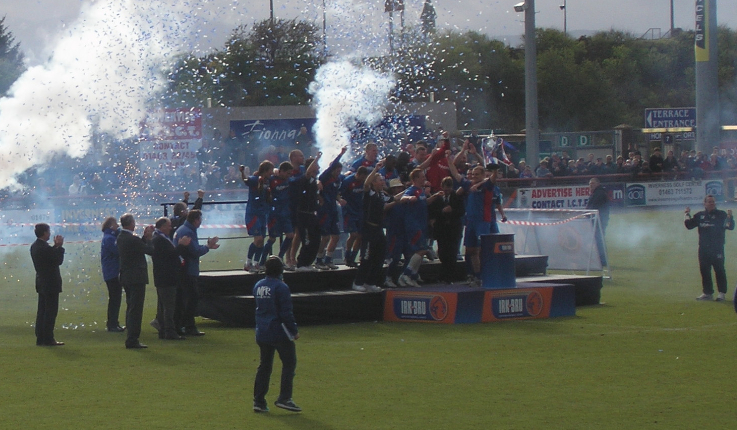
The team celebrating winning the First Division title in May 2010 at the Caledonian Stadium.

After a slow start to their first season back in the First Division, which looked set to be won at a canter by runaway leaders Dundee who were 15 points ahead in January, Inverness put together a run of form which saw them go on a 21-match unbeaten run. On 21 April 2010, Inverness secured promotion back to the SPL with two games to spare after Dundee lost to Raith Rovers. Inverness became the first team in ten years to secure an immediate return to the SPL. The team went on to celebrate their promotion with a 7–0 win at Ayr United, their biggest ever away win. On the final day of the season, Inverness beat Dundee 1–0, winning the league by 12 points.

=== Return to the SPL / Premiership (2010–2017) ===
Having won the 2009–10 First Division title in their first year back in the division since 2003–04, Inverness competed in the top tier of Scottish football from 2010 to 2017. In 2013–14, the club reached their first major final – the Scottish League Cup – losing on penalties to Aberdeen. They then beat Falkirk in the final of the Scottish Cup in 2015. That same season, Inverness secured entry to European competition for the first time, with a best-ever third-place finish in the Premiership.

As part of the push for promotion in the 2009–10 season, Inverness went on an unbeaten away run in the league that continued through the entire 2010 calendar year, culminating in a 1–1 draw against Hearts at Tynecastle on 18 December. This extraordinary sequence ended in defeat at St Johnstone on 2 January 2011 when the Perth side won by a single goal. At the split, Inverness narrowly missed out on a top six spot, eventually finishing in a club record-equalling 7th place. However, two years later, they would finish even higher.

During the 2012–13 season, a 3–0 win over Hibernian on 8 December 2012 saw them rise to second place in the SPL (behind Celtic), their then, highest ever league position.

Continued good form over the course of the season consolidated the club's position in the top-half of the table. Victory over Highland derby rivals Ross County on 16 March elevated Inverness Caledonian Thistle onto an almost unassailable points-total in their quest for a maiden 'top-6' finish. This achievement was confirmed the following day as the club benefited from a favourable result in the Sunday SPL fixture. This guarantee of a 'top-6' place ensured that the 2012–13 Scottish Premier League season would see Inverness Caledonian Thistle's record, their then, highest ever finishing league position.

Ultimately, Inverness Caledonian Thistle finished in 4th place, narrowly missing Europa League qualification on the final day of the season, succumbing to a 1–0 defeat from local rivals Ross County.

Inverness Caledonian Thistle began the inaugural season (2013–14 Scottish Premiership) of the revamped SPFL Scottish Premiership with a 3–0 win over St Mirren. This result saw the club take pole-position in the league table. They remained top of the league until the 9th game of the season when they dropped to 2nd place following a loss at St Johnstone.

On 11 November 2013, Hibernian reached a compensation deal with Inverness for Terry Butcher to move to the club, alongside assistant manager Maurice Malpas.

After an extensive recruitment process, on 4 December 2013, John Hughes was unveiled as the new manager of the club. In January 2014, Russell Latapy was appointed as Hughes' assistant manager.

In February 2014, Inverness defeated Hearts in the Scottish League Cup semi-final. Inverness struck first with Greg Tansey firing the Highland side into the lead. Jamie Hamill then scored 2 goals in 2 minutes and gave Hearts hope of reaching their second League Cup Final in two years. Just when Inverness were on the brink of defeat, Nick Ross equalised in the 94th minute and sent the game to extra time. After no goals being scored in extra time, Inverness clinched the win on penalties.

On 25 February, Inverness beat Ross County in Dingwall in the Highland Derby. The 3–0 win was the first time they had won a Highland Derby in Dingwall in the League since March 2003. They also won the next derby 2–1 on 4 April. The game was also played in Dingwall.

On 16 March, Inverness and Aberdeen faced each other in the 2014 Scottish League Cup Final at Celtic Park in Glasgow. After tense 120 minutes the two teams lined up for a penalty shoot-out. Inverness missed their first 2 penalties with Billy Mckay's penalty saved and Greg Tansey firing over the bar. Despite Nick Ross and Aaron Doran scoring their penalties Aberdeen won 4–2.

Inverness finished the season with a 2–0 win over St Johnstone thanks to second half goals from Ryan Christie and Greg Tansey.

Between May and September 2014, Inverness kept a series of consecutive clean sheets, enabling them to achieve a club record of 616 minutes without conceding a goal.

Further success followed that season, with a 1–0 victory away to Dundee, scored by Eddie Ofere, confirming a record third-place league finish for the club. This also guaranteed Inverness qualifying for European football for the first time – competing in the 2015–16 UEFA Europa League.

=== Scottish Cup victory and European qualification (2014–2015) ===
Inverness Caledonian Thistle capped an extraordinary 2014–15 season by winning the Scottish Cup Final against Falkirk at Hampden Park. This result came after they had defeated Celtic in a tense semi-final.
As of 2025, the Scottish Cup win is the club's only major national trophy. It entitled Inverness Caledonian Thistle to enter the 2015–16 UEFA Europa League in the Second qualifying round. The club were drawn against Romanian outfit FC Astra Giurgiu. An estimated 500 fans followed the team to Romania, watching the team grind out a 0–0 draw. However this was not enough to set up a tie against West Ham United in the next round, as the Romanians had narrowly beaten the Highlanders 1–0 in the first leg in Inverness.

=== Relegation and the Scottish Championship (2017–2024) ===
League performance since 1994

The team failed to carry the form from the previous season due to the loss of key players such as Marley Watkins, Graeme Shinnie and Edward Ofere. Furthermore, an approach from Dundee United to bring John Hughes to the Tangerines in October was rejected by Inverness, leaving Hughes frustrated.
The club's defence of the Scottish Cup began by beating Stirling Albion after a replay. In the following round, a Jordan Roberts goal against Motherwell set-up a tie against Hibernian. Inverness lost a replay to the Edinburgh club, who eventually went on to win the competition. Hughes left at the end of the season after mutually terminating his contract, citing a collapse in relations with the board.

Club captain Richie Foran was appointed as his successor, despite having no previous managerial experience. The club started the season scoring fifteen goals in four League Cup group games. They also recorded a 2–2 draw in the league against Celtic, the only club to take a point off the Glaswegians for close to a year. However, this good form dropped off, and Inverness did not win a league game from October until February – when a last-minute overhead kick from Billy Mckay lead to a 2–1 win over Rangers.

Inverness were relegated to the Scottish Championship on the final day of the 2016–17 season, despite recording a 3–2 victory over Motherwell. After Foran was sacked from his position, former manager John Robertson was appointed as his successor on 14 June 2017.

Inverness reached the 2017–18 Scottish Challenge Cup Final, after a 3–2 win over Northern Irish invitee side Crusaders at home, meaning the club's would make their fourth cup final appearance, and John Robertson's second challenge cup final at the club. Inverness went on to lift the cup on 24 March 2018, with Carl Tremarco scoring the only goal of the game seconds before the game was due to go into added time. Robertson became the first manager in the cup's history to lift the trophy twice with the same club.

This cup win kick-started an unbeaten run of 13 games as Inverness went from lingering around the lower echelons of the table to mid-table. However, despite a late push, an injury-time equaliser in the final home game of the season against Dunfermline meant the club narrowly missed out on the promotion play-offs by just two points, finishing in 5th place despite winning 3–0 away to Greenock Morton on the final day, which would've confirmed a play-off slot had Dunfermlne either drawn or lost to Dumbarton.

In August 2018, the club was saddened to learn of the death of ex-player Alan Hercher at 52 years of age. He was the club's first captain, goalscorer and hat-trick scorer – in their first league game against Arbroath. In tribute, a minute's silence was held at Inverness' first home game of the 2018–19 Scottish Championship season against Ayr United which ended in a 0–0 draw.

In the new year, Inverness were doing better than they had the previous season, sitting in the play-off spots despite drawing nearly every game. The club beat rivals Ross County to progress into the quarter-finals of the Scottish Cup, and reached the semi-final after a last gasp winner from Aaron Doran against Dundee United. This was the 4th semi-final appearance for the club, after appearances in 2002–03, 2003–04 and 2014–15. They played Heart of Midlothian in the semi-final, but were defeated 3–0.

By the end of the season, Inverness had secured a play-off spot, after leapfrogging Ayr United into 3rd place. In the quarter-finals, Inverness defeated Ayr, winning 3–1 in the first leg, and drawing 1–1 in the second, securing a comfortable 4–2 aggregate win. But they lost to Dundee United in the semi-finals. In the first leg, at home, they lost 1–0 while down to 10 men after Liam Polworth was handed a straight red for an apparent high foot on Mark Connolly while making a clearance. In the away leg at Tannadice, Dundee United were awarded and scored a controversial penalty just before half time. The penalty was conceded by a Brad McKay handball, after it deflected off his heel. There was more controversy just after half time, when the referee did not see a handball, and John Robertson was sent to the stands for flicking a water-bottle in aggravation near the 4th official. Inverness lost 3–0, making 4–0 on aggregate. After the match, Robertson stated in an interview with the BBC on what punishments he would receive from the SFA for his actions:

"I don't care. They [the SFA] can ban me for as long as they want. I'm going to start speaking out now because I've had enough of it."

July 2019 saw the beginning of the 25th anniversary celebrations: a new 3rd kit was announced as well as a special friendly game. The League Cup campaign was poor: an 11–10 loss on penalties to Peterhead was followed by wins over Raith Rovers and Cove Rangers, but for the third year on the trot the club failed to progress to the next round. The league, like the League Cup, started off disappointingly, with to a 4–1 defeat by Dundee United at Tannadice Park. However, the following weekend they won 2–1 at home against Arbroath. The game came one year after the death of the club's first captain, Alan Hercher, who scored a hat-trick against the same opposition in the first (home) game of the club's existence, almost 25 years before. This game saw the debut of the anniversary kit.

By the end of February, the club was close to securing a second-place finish, and potentially even winning title ahead of Dundee United, who were dropping crucial points. However, for the first time since the Second World War, the league was postponed: due to the coronavirus pandemic with the SPFL shut down all football in Scotland from the Premiership to local leagues. It was decided to finish the season as it stood, and to do away with the play-offs. This was met with controversy, as Inverness, Partick and Dundee planned on voting against this decision; however, Dundee changed their vote at the last minute, leading to the league standings being finalised. Had Dundee also voted no, the SPFL proposition would have failed and the playoffs would have taken place. Following this outcome, a league reconstruction proposal was made, which would have seen Inverness go up with Dundee United to form a 14 team Scottish Premiership, resulting in Partick being spared relegation into League One. However, as of 22 July 2020, the talks collapsed, with Hearts and Partick taking the matter to court and subsequently to an SFA tribunal.

In the 2020–21 season, Inverness finished in 5th place, narrowly missing out on the promotion play-offs despite spending the early part of the season in the relegation zone. On 30 April 2021, it was announced that the previous season's Challenge Cup Final would not take place and instead the cup would be shared between Inverness and fellow finalists Raith Rovers.

In May 2021, John Robertson took up the role of the club's Sporting Director. The following month, Billy Dodds was appointed as manager.

In the 2021–22 season, Inverness finished in fourth place, despite going through an 11-game winless spell between December and early March, and ultimately made it to the Premiership play-off final, but they were beaten 6–2 on aggregate by St Johnstone.

At the start of the 2022–23 season, Inverness brought in five new signings and a season-long loan. Daniel MacKay was loaned back to his boyhood club from Hibernian. The other signings were Max Ram, Steven Boyd, Zak Delaney, Nathan Shaw and the return of George Oakley.

In July 2022, Inverness made it out of the League Cup group stages for the first time since 2016, before being beaten 4–0 in the following round by Motherwell.

The club finished sixth in the Championship that season despite an eight game winless streak from October until the end of 2022.

=== Second Scottish Cup final ===
In April 2023, Inverness clinched a place in the Scottish Cup final for the second time in eight years, beating Falkirk 3–0. Billy Mckay scored a brace and Daniel MacKay netted the other. It was the first Inverness match that involved the use of VAR, which gave Inverness their opening goal from a penalty, after a Falkirk handball. In the final, Inverness played a treble-chasing Celtic. Despite Daniel MacKay scoring in the 85th minute, Inverness lost to Celtic by 3–1.

=== Relegation to League One, Administration, Alan Savage takeover and promotion back to the Championship (2024–2026) ===
Inverness began the 2023–24 season in terrible form, losing eight of their opening ten games of the season in all competitions, resulting in manager Billy Dodds being sacked. Dodds was replaced with former Everton coach and Forest Green Rovers manager Duncan Ferguson.

Following Ferguson's arrival results picked up slightly, but despite a January squad overhaul the club continued fighting relegation. Inverness finished the season in 9th place in the Scottish Championship, entering the relegation play offs. After beating Montrose 1–0 on aggregate in the semi-finals, Inverness lost 5–3 on aggregate to Hamilton Academical in the final, meaning Inverness were relegated to Scottish League One, the first time the club has played in the third tier since 1999.

Following relegation, the club announced it was remaining full time, in addition to a highly controversial move of training facilities 136-miles south to Kelty Hearts' New Central Park. However, the move to Kelty was reversed following the resignation of Chairman Ross Morrison, with the club continuing to train at Fort George. On 13 August 2024, with the club on the brink of administration, they were briefly saved by local businessman and former chairman Alan Savage, who subsequently relieved Scot Gardiner as CEO, cancelled a controversial takeover proposal by Ketan Makwana's Seventy7 Ventures, and cleared debts owed by the club to various sources, including shirt manufacturers Puma. However, despite the efforts to stabilise the club, it was revealed in October that the club was looking likely to head into administration, with £200,000 needed by October 16 to keep the club solvent until the end of the month, and £1.2m to make it to the end of the season.

Despite holding talks with multiple potential investors, most notably Anders Holch Povlsen, the owner of Danish football club FC Midtjylland, it was announced on 18 October 2024 that Inverness would be appointing administrators, becoming the first football club in Scotland to do so since Heart of Midlothian in 2013, the first in-season points deduction in Scottish football since Dunfermline in 2012–13 and the first team to enter administration in the SPFL era. On 22 October 2024 it was confirmed the club had officially entered administration, incurring an immediate 15 point deduction. The following day it was confirmed by the club that manager Duncan Ferguson, assistant manager Gary Bollan and goalkeeping coach Stuart Garden had left the club with immediate effect, with first team coach Scott Kellacher placed in charge of the side, with all time club top goalscorer Billy Mckay filling the role of assistant. On 24 October, despite it being announced that backroom staff were safe from redundancies, Adam Brooks, Cameron Ferguson, Wallace Duffy and Flynn Duffy were released from their contracts by the administrators, as well as Jack Newman's loan from Dundee United being terminated.

On 4 November 2024, the club announced that they had received expressions of interest from 20 potential buyers.

On 17 March 2025, it was revealed that no offers to purchase the club were made before the deadline on 6 March, with loan debts and ownership issues of the surrounding land cited, and that liquidation would be almost inevitable by the end of the season should shareholders not be able to sort the outlying issues.

On 10 April 2025, the administrators announced that Alan Savage was the preferred bidder for the club, on the agreement that he would become 100% shareholder and long-term debts were written off.

On 26 April 2025, Inverness overcame their 15 point deduction to secure safety with a 3–0 win over league champions, Arbroath, and a 2–0 win over Montrose the following week to ultimately finish 7th. Had Inverness not received a points deduction, the club would have finished as runner up in the league, 6 points behind champions, Arbroath.

On 5 June 2025, it was officially announced that the club had been taken out of administration after all shareholders transferred their shares to Alan Savage.

In March 2026, it was announced that Inverness had entered into an official partnership with USL League Two side Lorain County Leviathan from Avon, Ohio, in order to boost brand exposure in the United States.

On 2 May 2026, The club achieved their return to the Championship despite their five point penalty for entering administration the previous season by beating Hamilton Academical 2–1 in front of 5,029 fans, the largest attendance at a home game since May 2017.

== Kit history ==
List of manufacturers and sponsors
Season	Manufacturer	Shirt Sponsor
1994–1995	(England) Matchwinner	(Scotland) Scottish Citylink
1995–1998	(France) Le Coq Sportif	(Scotland) Scottish Citylink
1998–1999	(France) Le Coq Sportif	(Scotland) ScotRail
1999–2001	(Italy) Erreà	(Scotland) ScotRail
2001–2003	(Italy) Erreà	(Japan) Sharp
2003–2004	(Italy) Erreà	(Scotland) Inverness Medical
2004–2007	(Italy) Erreà	(United States) OneTouch
2007–2010	(Italy) Erreà	(England) Flybe
2010–2014	(Italy) Erreà	(Scotland) Orion Group
2014–2015	(Italy) Erreà	(United States) Subway
2015–2016	(England) Carbrini	(United States) Subway
2016–2017	(England) Carbrini	(Scotland) McEwan Fraser Legal
2017–2020	(Italy) Erreà	(Scotland) McEwan Fraser Legal
2020–2025	(Germany) Puma	(Scotland) Intelligent Land Investments
2025–2026	(Germany) Puma	(Scotland) Craig Wood Solicitors
2026–	(Italy) Macron	(England) BetGoodwin

In 2017 Inverness cut ties with Carbrini due to delays in manufacturing of replica kits, which angered many fans who had ordered their kits which took months to arrive at their homes. The kits were only available at JD Sports Stores, and did not become available to buy until a month into the 2016–17 season. Inverness partnered up with longtime supplier Errea in May 2017 in time for the 2017–18 season.

In August 2019 a 3rd Kit, which was given a limited release of less than 300, was launched. The kit featured 4 vertical stripes of red, black, white and blue, a silver crest, and the names of all the players who were with the team in the 1994–95 season, as well as featuring the anniversary logo used to promote the occasion and a one-off 25th anniversary sponsor.

In May 2020, it was revealed that the club's contract with Erreà had run out as well as potentially the sponsorship by McEwan Fraser Legal. In the club's fan podcast, The Wyness Shuffle, it was revealed by club chairman Ross Morrison that Inverness had signed a deal with German sports manufacturers Puma and further details would be disclosed by the club at a later date.

In October 2024, following the administration event, it was announced that the club were trying to get their deal with Puma torn up, due to previous CEO Scot Gardiner penning a deal which meant the club were paying over £100,000 per season on a 4 year deal with the manufacturer.

In August 2025 it was announced that the club had agreed a two year deal with Craig Wood Solicitors to be the clubs shirt sponsors for the 2025–26 and 2026–27 seasons.

In April 2026, it was revealed by the club that they had entered a deal with Macron to become the club’s official kit supplier starting from the 2026–27 season.

== Rivalries ==
=== Ross County ===
Inverness have had a long-standing rivalry with local club Ross County, who are situated a few miles north of Inverness in Dingwall. The rivalry began when both teams were elected to the SFL in the 1994–95 Season. They contest the Highland derby. Inverness are the dominant team within the derby with 27 wins to County's 17.

=== Clachnacuddin ===
Inverness also has a long-lasting rivalry with Clachnacuddin, which goes back to before Caledonian and Inverness Thistle merged. All three teams were founding members of the Highland League, and all their grounds were close together in Inverness. This led to the City Derby. Though this rivalry is on a lesser scale than it was before the election of Inverness to the SFL, it still exists through pre-season friendlies. Inverness has 17 wins in this fixture, and Clach only two.

=== Aberdeen ===
A lesser derby fixture is the North derby between Inverness and Aberdeen, which is still regarded as a derby even though the clubs are over 100 miles apart. The rivalry started when Inverness were ground sharing with Aberdeen at Pittodrie Stadium in 2004 when Inverness first gained promotion to the top flight, and their ground was being improved to the standards required to be a SPL team.

By far the biggest game between the two was the 2014 Scottish League Cup Final at Celtic Park, where Inverness held Aberdeen to a 0–0 draw, but ultimately lost 4–2 on penalties. Aberdeen are the dominant team in the derby with 24 wins to 10.

== Stadium ==
The Highland Council contributed £900,000 towards the development of Caledonian Stadium. The stadium is situated beside the Moray Firth, in the shadow of the Kessock Bridge. Its construction was promised in their election to the Scottish Football League. The former ground of Caledonian, Telford Street, was used until the new stadium was complete. The stadium has 4 stands – The North Stand, The Jock McDonald Main Stand, The South Stand, and the small West Stand. Away supporters are housed in the South Stand, which can hold around 2200 supporters, as well as being given the West Stand and uncovered section of the Main Stand if demand is exceeded, however, if demand is not met, away supporters may be given the uncovered section in the Main Stand. The North and South stands were constructed in 2005 in order to meet SPL requirements. The West Stand was constructed in 2007, holding around 400. It was intended to be used as a singing section, however, the stand remained unused on most match days, outwith of large away allocations, until early 2022, when a new group called Section 94 made use of it as a singing section. As part of stadium renovations, the seats were removed and the stand was re-opened as an uncovered stand. The stadium has a Sports Bar, which in 2024 began to be ran by the ICT Supporters Trust, who staff the bar and donate the bar takings to the club.

In 2019, the stadium was gifted back to the club, and its original name of Caledonian Stadium returned. It was renamed to the Sarens PSG Stadium in 2025 as a part of a sponsorship deal.

=== Attendance ===
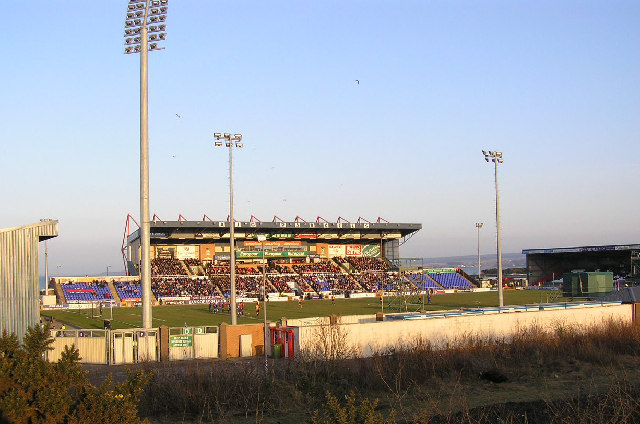
Tulloch Caledonian Stadium

The club's highest 'home' (league) attendance actually occurred while they were groundsharing with Aberdeen at Pittodrie. With Inverness fans in the traditional home end, and Aberdeen fans filling the away end, a record attendance of 9,530 was set on 16 October 2004. This record may stand for some time, as the crowd that day was bigger than the current capacity of Caledonian Stadium.

The club's highest cup attendance was also recorded in a venue other than their home ground. A crowd of 11,296 watched Inverness play Rangers on 9 March 1996 at Tannadice in Dundee. The game had been switched to Dundee as the club's home ground (Telford Street Park at that time) was deemed unsuitable for the Scottish Cup quarter-final tie.

The highest attendance recorded at the Caledonian Stadium is 7,753 set on 20 January 2008 against Rangers.

In February 2021, the attendance record was beaten, albeit unofficially, by a joint effort between Inverness and Heart of Midlothian as a thanks for Inverness helping Hearts when they fell into administration in 2013. This generated revenue of over £10,000. Following this the club introduced a limited run of Matchday programmes for the game. The club stated they were going to use the revenue from the ticket and programme sales to buy a new cover for the pitch after the club's start in 2021 was plagued by postponements due to rain and heavy snow. Towards the end of the match, which ended 1–1, it was announced that 11,356 tickets had been sold. At the time, matches were being played behind closed doors due to the Coronavirus pandemic.

== Players ==
=== Current squad ===
As of 18 September 2026

Note: Flags indicate national team as defined under FIFA eligibility rules; some limited exceptions apply. Players may hold more than one non-FIFA nationality.

No.	Pos.	Nation	Player
1	GK	SCO	Ross Munro
2	MF	SCO	Calum MacLeod
3	DF	FRA	Noa Boutin
4	MF	SCO	Graeme Shinnie
5	DF	ENG	Remi Savage
6	DF	NIR	Danny Devine (captain)
7	MF	SCO	Paul Allan
8	MF	SCO	Adam Mackinnon
9	FW	ENG	Layton Stewart
10	MF	CAN	David Wotherspoon
11	MF	ENG	Luis Longstaff

No.	Pos.	Nation	Player
12	MF	SCO	Daniel MacKay
15	DF	SCO	Kerr Smith
16	MF	SCO	Ryan Duncan
17	MF	ENG	Liam Sole
19	FW	WAL	Morgan Bates (on loan from Swansea City)
20	FW	ENG	Junior Osong
21	GK	SCO	Logan Ross
26	MF	SCO	Roddy MacGregor
35	MF	SCO	Alfie Stewart (on loan from Aberdeen)
36	FW	SCO	Alfie Bavidge (on loan from Aberdeen)

=== On loan ===
Note: Flags indicate national team as defined under FIFA eligibility rules; some limited exceptions apply. Players may hold more than one non-FIFA nationality.

No.	Pos.	Nation	Player
—	GK	POL	Szymon Rebilas (co-operation loan with Rothes)
—	DF	SCO	James Clark (co-operation loan with Brora Rangers)
—	DF	SCO	Archie Kerr (on loan at Nairn County)
—	DF	SCO	Ellis Leighton (on loan at Forres Mechanics)
—	MF	SCO	Joe Chalmers (on loan at Cove Rangers)
—	MF	SCO	Kenzie Harkness (on loan at Forres Mechanics)
—	MF	SCO	Shae Keogh (on loan at Clachnacuddin)

No.	Pos.	Nation	Player
—	MF	SCO	Dylan MacKay (on loan at Inverness Athletic)
—	MF	SCO	Jake Rodgers (co-operation loan with Brora Rangers)
—	MF	SCO	Sam Thompson (on loan at Clachnacuddin)
—	FW	SCO	Ben Corner (on loan at Strathspey Thistle)
—	FW	SCO	Miller Keir (on loan at Cove Rangers)
—	FW	SCO	Sam Reid (on loan at Forres Mechanics)

== Personnel ==
=== Club staff ===
Position	Name
Head coach	Scott Kellacher
Assistant head coach	Billy Mckay
First team coach	Josh Meekings
Goalkeeping coach	Vacant
Head of youth	Ross Jack
Academy coach	Gordon Nicolson
Physiotherapist	David Proctor
Sports therapist	Natalie Bodiam
Groundsman	Dale Stephen
Kitman	Jack Davis

=== Board of directors ===
Position	Name
Chairman	Alan Savage
CEO	Charlie Christie
Director	Graeme Bennett
Director	George Moodie
Director	Dawn Savage
Supporter liaison officer	Scott Young
Honorary club president	Roddy Ross

== Notable players ==
Players who have played at international level whilst contracted to Inverness CT and years contracted to club:

(Players in Bold are currently contracted to the club)

=== Senior caps ===
- Richard Hastings (Canada) 1994–2001; 2004–2009
- Davide Xausa (Canada) 1999–2001
- Henri Anier (Estonia) 2017
- Lonsana Doumbouya (Guinea) 2016–2017
- Pāvels Mihadjuks (Latvia) 2009
- Billy Mckay (Northern Ireland) 2011–2015; 2017; 2021–2026
- Jonathan Tuffey (Northern Ireland) 2010–2012
- Marius Niculae (Romania) 2007–2008
- Andrew Shinnie (Scotland) 2011–2013
- Owain Fôn Williams (Wales) 2015–2019
- Owain Tudur Jones (Wales) 2011–2013
- Chanka Zimba (Zambia) 2025–2026

=== Youth caps ===
- Calum Ferguson (Canada U-18 & Canada U-20) 2013–2016
- Bajram Fetai (Denmark U-20) 2005
- Aaron Doran (Republic of Ireland U-21) 2011–2024
- Adam Evans (Republic of Ireland U-19) 2013–2014
- Jake Mulraney (Republic of Ireland U-21) 2016–2018
- Conor Pepper (Republic of Ireland U-19) 2012–2014
- Adam Rooney (Republic of Ireland U-21) 2008–2011
- Gil Blumstein (Israel U-21) 2010–2011
- Ian Black (Scotland B) 2004–2009
- Mark Brown (Scotland B) 2002–2007
- Ryan Christie (Scotland U-21) 2013–2015
- Craig Dargo (Scotland B) 2005–2007
- Robbie Deas (Scotland U-21) 2020–2023
- Jamie Duff (Scotland U-21) 2008–2010
- Cameron Harper (Scotland U-21) 2017–2024
- Kai Kennedy (Scotland U-19) 2020–2021
- Alex MacDonald (Scotland U-21) 2011
- **Daniel MacKay** (Scotland U-19 & Scotland U-21) 2017–2021; 2022–2023; **2026–**
- **Roddy MacGregor** (Scotland U-21) 2018–2024; **2026–**
- **Calum MacLeod** (Scotland U-21) **2022–**
- Rory McAllister (Scotland U-20 & Scotland U-21) 2005–2009
- Jamie McCart (Scotland U-21) 2017; 2018–2020
- Tom Parratt (Scotland U-19) 2005–2006
- Liam Polworth (Scotland U-17 & Scotland U-21) 2011–2019
- Bryan Prunty (Scotland U-21) 2004–2005
- Nick Ross (Scotland U-21) 2009–2015
- **Graeme Shinnie** (Scotland U-21) 2009–2015; **2026–**
- **Alfie Stewart** (Scotland U-21) 2025; 2025–2026; **2026–**
- Iain Vigurs (Scotland U-19) 2006–2009; 2015–2018
- Sam Pearson (Wales U-21) 2022

== Managers ==
List of Inverness Caledonian Thistle managers and head coaches:

As of 14 December 2025

Name	From	Until	Played	Won	Drawn	Lost	Win %	Honours / Notes
(Ukraine) Sergei Baltacha	1994	1995	40	13	10	17	32.50	Player/Manager of Caledonian F.C. prior to merger.
(Scotland) Steve Paterson	1995	2002	329	147	92	90	44.68	Longest serving manager of Inverness CT. 1996–97 Scottish Third Division winner. 1998–99 Scottish Second Division runner-up securing promotion. 1999–2000 Scottish Challenge Cup finalist.
(Scotland) John Robertson	2002	2004	84	44	13	27	52.38	2003–04 Scottish First Division winner. 2003–04 Scottish Challenge Cup winner.
(Scotland) Craig Brewster	2004	2006	50	17	18	15	34.00	
(Scotland) Charlie Christie	2006	2007	67	24	18	15	35.82	
(Scotland) Craig Brewster	2007	2009	64	22	7	35	34.38	Second spell.
(England) Terry Butcher	2009	2013	209	87	58	64	41.63	2009–10 Scottish First Division winner. 2009–10 Scottish Challenge Cup runner-up.
(Scotland) John Hughes	2013	2016	122	50	31	41	41.30	2013–14 Scottish League Cup runner-up. 2014–15 Scottish Cup winner.
(Republic of Ireland) Richie Foran	2016	2017	45	11	14	20	24.44	
(Scotland) John Robertson	2017	2021	137	65	34	38	47.45	Second spell. 2017–18 Scottish Challenge Cup winner. 2019–20 Scottish Challenge Cup winner (shared with Raith Rovers).
(Scotland) Billy Dodds	2021	2023	110	48	25	37	43.64	2022–23 Scottish Cup runner-up.
(Scotland) Duncan Ferguson	2023	2024	53	17	20	16	32.08	
(Scotland) Scott Kellacher	2024	Present	54	35	6	13	64.81	2025–26 Scottish Challenge Cup runner-up. 2025–26 Scottish League One winner.

=== Managerial history ===
Sergei Baltacha had been manager of Caledonian prior to the merger and he carried on as Caledonian Thistle manager after the merger in 1994. He remained in charge for only one season, leaving in 1995 to be closer to his family in Perth. Baltacha was replaced by Huntly manager Steve Paterson, who to date is the club's longest-serving manager. During his seven and a half years as manager, from the summer of 1995 to December 2002, Paterson succeeded in taking the club to the Scottish Football League First Division. He also steered ICT to their famous 3–1 Scottish Cup victory against Celtic in 2000. In November 2002, Paterson was strongly linked to the vacant manager's position at Dundee United. However, he chose to stay with Inverness for another month, after which he left, along with assistant Duncan Shearer, to become manager of Aberdeen.

The club also had a director of football, with former player Graeme Bennett appointed while Steve Paterson was manager. Paterson was replaced by former Hearts player John Robertson, whose two-year reign as manager was an exceptionally successful period. Under Robertson, Inverness won the 2003–04 Scottish Challenge Cup, gained another Scottish Cup victory over Celtic, this time 1–0 thanks to a goal on the stroke of half time by club record scorer Dennis Wyness and won the First Division Championship, taking the club into the SPL. Robertson eventually left to become Hearts manager and was replaced by Dunfermline's Craig Brewster as player-manager. Brewster succeeded in keeping the club in the SPL. He also introduced new training regimes to increase player fitness and was successful in steering the club to good results against a number of established Premier League sides, including Rangers, Celtic, Motherwell, Hearts and Hibs. After a period at the club of just over thirteen months he left to become the new Dundee United manager after the sacking of Gordon Chisholm.

Former player Charlie Christie was appointed manager on 27 January 2006, after a successful spell as caretaker manager following the departure of Brewster, during which time Inverness achieved three wins out of three games played, including a record victory for the club in the SPL as they beat Falkirk 4–1 away from home. He resigned on 19 August 2007 due to the pressures of the job, and because he believed it to be the correct decision for him and his family. He has now resumed his former role, running the club's Centenary Club lottery. A short time after Christie resigned, Craig Brewster was reappointed. This was a controversial decision by the club, as Brewster had left to manage Dundee United only 18 months previously. He was eventually sacked in January 2009, after a run of seven league defeats.

Brewster's successor, the former England international Terry Butcher was appointed on 27 January 2009, along with Maurice Malpas as his assistant. Terry Butcher managed in over 200 matches for the club, the 100th taking place on Friday 6 October 2012, in the 3–1 win over Ross County in the first SPL Highland derby. In November 2013, after nearly five years at Inverness, Hibernian reached a compensation deal with the club for Terry Butcher to move to Easter Road alongside assistant manager Maurice Malpas.

After an extensive recruitment process, on 4 December 2013, John Hughes was unveiled as the new manager of the club. Hughes left Caledonian Thistle on 20 May 2016, citing frustrations with his player budget and the club's failure to retain players.

Long-term player Richie Foran was announced as the new Inverness manager on 30 May 2016, also announcing his player retirement. Foran was in charge of Caley Thistle for just under one-year before being sacked on 29 May 2017. During his time in charge, the club finished in last position in the Scottish Premiership, suffering relegation to the Scottish Championship on the final day of the season despite a 3–2 win over Motherwell. The club needed a win from Dundee over Hamilton Academical, to secure play-offs, which unfortunately did not come as Dundee succumbed to a 4–0 defeat.

A few weeks after the sacking of Foran, former manager John Robertson, who brought the club into the Premiership for the first time in their history in 2004, returned to manage the club in a bid to get them back to top flight. Doing this, he became the second former manager to return to managing the club, after Craig Brewster left in 2006 and came back for a second spell in 2007. Robertson's attempt to return to the top flight immediately was halted by Dunfermline Athletic after a late goal stopped any chances of Inverness making the play-offs, and took the season, like the previous year, to the last day, where Dumbarton were playing Dunfermline Athletic, and Inverness were away to Greenock Morton. To secure a play-off spot, Dunfermline had to lose and Inverness had to win. Inverness did their part with a 3–0 win, but Dumbarton lost 4–0 after going down to 10 men against the Pars.

The following season did not start out successful, with 9 draws in their first 12 games, which also included failing to defend the Challenge Cup title after being defeated 2–1 by Dunfermline. However results soon picked up and by May, Inverness captured a play-off spot; they also enjoyed a strong cup run with a 6–1 win over Edinburgh City, a 4–0 win over East Kilbride, a 5–4 penalty win over Ross County and a 2–1 win over Dundee United before heading to Hampden where they were beaten 3–0 by Hearts in the semi-final. The play-offs started well, however after beating Ayr United 4–2 on aggregate hopes were shattered with a controversial 4–0 loss to Dundee United in the semi-final.

The 2019–20 season started off, again, with an early League Cup exit. Come March, the club were doing well in the Challenge Cup and league. However, the season was abruptly cut short due to the COVID-19 pandemic. This meant that the season of every league from the Championship down was to be abandoned with the league tables being recognised as the final positions, however, the play-offs would not take place, resulting in Inverness being set for a 4th consecutive season in the Championship, and Dundee United, being promoted to the Premiership. This was officially confirmed on 9 May 2020, after the SPFL announced there would be no league reconstruction as there was not enough support from Premiership sides. Inverness finished their season on 10 March with a 3–1 home win over Queen of the South. On 10 May, a strongly worded statement was released by the club, which agreed with multiple other clubs statements of the SPFL bullying clubs during the Season Ending Vote, and that officials were turning a blind eye to all reported cases.

In early 2021, John Robertson left on compassionate leave due to a death in his family, and was subsequently replaced by interim manager Neil McCann, who took Inverness out of the relegation playoff zone into the top half and competing for promotion playoffs.

Ahead of the 2021–22 season, it was announced that Robertson would not be returning to a management role, instead dropping to a Director of Football role, nor would McCann take charge, turning down the opportunity, and it was announced that former Rangers and Scotland international Billy Dodds would take charge. In his first season, he took Inverness on a 7 game unbeaten run, and won Manager of the Month for September, before going on an 11 game winless run through Christmas and into the New Year. Despite this, Inverness managed to avoid dropping out of the playoff positions at any point during the season, and lost 6–2 on aggregate in the Premiership Playoff final against St Johnstone. The 2022–23 season started very much the same, with Inverness only losing twice in 10 league games between August and October, before going on an 8 game winless run over the festive period. Inverness ultimately finished 6th, but despite that, managed to go on a cup run that led them all the way to their second ever Scottish Cup final, which they lost 3–1 to Celtic.

During the 2023–24 season, Dodds was relieved of his duties after only claiming 1 point from the opening 6 fixtures which left Inverness rooted to the bottom of the table, before Everton legend Duncan Ferguson was announced as manager, briefly getting Inverness away from the relegation zone. However the club ended up embroiled in an unsuccessful relegation battle as they lost 5–3 to Hamilton Academical over two legs of the playoff final, dropping into the third tier for the first time since the 1998–99 season.

On October 22 2024 the club entered administration, leading to the departure of Duncan Ferguson, his assistant Gary Bollan and goalkeeping coach Stuart Garden the following day. Coach Scott Kellacher was appointed as manager.

== Mascots ==
In recent years, the club have embraced the trend of adopting an official mascot. These have included:

- ICaT – a play on the initials 'ICT', ICaT was designed from the winning drawing in a competition amongst Inverness school children.
- Sub Man – a Submarine sandwich in a Superhero costume was retired after Subway cancelled their sponsorship.
- Nessie (and Nessa) – a 'Nessie' costume wearing the club's home kit. This creation was rebranded as Lionel Nessi, in reference to international footballer Lionel Messi, and debuted at the 2018 Scottish Challenge Cup Final. In September 2025, Nessi was replaced by a new Nessie, and a female counterpart, Nessa, sporting the club's home and away kits, respectively.

== Honours ==
=== League ===
- Scottish First Division / Championship (second tier):
  - Winners (2): 2003–04, 2009–10
  - Runners up (1): 2019–20
- Scottish Second Division / League One (third tier):
  - Winners (1): 2025–26
  - Runners up (1): 1998–99
- Scottish Third Division (fourth tier):
  - Winners (1): 1996–97
- North Caledonian League (reserve team):
  - Winners (2): 1994–95, 1997–98

=== Cup ===
- Scottish Cup:
  - Winners (1): 2014–15
  - Runners up (1): 2022–23
- Scottish League Cup:
  - Runners up (1): 2013–14
- Scottish Challenge Cup:
  - Winners (3): 2003–04, 2017–18, 2019–20*
  - Runners up (3): 1999–00, 2009–10, 2025–26
- Inverness Cup:
  - Winners (8): 1995–96, 1996–97, 1997–98, 1998–99, 1999–00, 2001–02, 2004–05, 2023–24
- North of Scotland Cup:
  - Winners (4): 1999–00, 2007–08, 2009–10, 2011–12
- Chic Allan Cup:
  - Winners (2): 1994–95, 1998–99
- Football Times Cup:
  - Winners (1): 1998–99
- PCT Cup:
  - Winners (1): 1998–99

*Shared with Raith Rovers

== Records ==
=== Attendance ===
All competitions

At Telford Street Park

- Highest attendance: 4,931 v Ross County, 23 January 1996.
- Lowest attendance: 491 v Albion Rovers, 11 April 1995.
- Highest average attendance: 1,579, 1995–96
- Lowest average attendance: 1,276, 1994–95

At Caledonian Stadium*

- Highest attendance: 7,753 v Rangers, 20 January 2008.
- Lowest attendance: 300 v Raith Rovers, 21 November 2020; and Dundee, 12 December 2020.
- Highest average attendance: 5,061, 2005–06
- Lowest average attendance: 1,694, 2024–25

*During the COVID-19 pandemic, where fans were not permitted inside stadia, Inverness and Hearts fans virtually sold out the stadium for the match between the two on 26 February 2021, with the final count being 11,356. Though not an official attendance, it is the largest number of tickets sold for a home match involving the club.

At Pittodrie Stadium

- Highest attendance: 9,530 v Aberdeen, 16 October 2004.
- Lowest attendance: 1,125 v Dundee United, 23 November 2004.

At Tannadice Park*

- 11,296 v Rangers, 1995–96 Scottish Cup Quarter Final, 9 March 1996.

*One-off, as Telford Street was deemed unsuitable for a Scottish Cup Quarter Final.

=== Players ===
- All-time top scorer: Billy Mckay, 114 goals.
- All-time most appearances: Ross Tokely, 456 appearances.
- Longest spell at club: Ross Tokely, 1996–2012, 17 years.
- Highest transfer sum paid: John Rankin from Ross County, £65,000, July 2006.
- Highest transfer sum received: Ryan Christie to Celtic, £500,000, September 2015.
- Most goals in a single season: Iain Stewart, 27 Goals, 1996–97.
- Most goals in a match: Billy Mckay, 5 goals, v Arbroath. 23 July 2013. (Friendly).
- Fastest goal: Max Anderson, 19 secs, v Partick Thistle, 23 December 2023. (Scottish Championship).
- Fastest hat-trick: Alex Samuel, 9 mins, v Raith Rovers, 27 January 2024. (Scottish Championship).
- Youngest player: Daniel MacKay, 16 years, 2 months and 20 days v Peterhead, 7 October 2017. (Scottish Challenge Cup)
- Oldest player: Jim Calder, 41 years, 8 months and 29 days, v Partick Thistle, 27 April 2002. (Scottish First Division)
- Youngest goalscorer: Daniel MacKay, 16 years, 2 months and 20 days v Peterhead, 7 October 2017. (Scottish Challenge Cup)
- Oldest goalscorer: Craig Brewster, 40 years, 9 months and 9 days, v Heart of Midlothian, 22 September 2007. (Scottish Premier League)
- Most international caps: Richard Hastings for Canada, 59.

=== Overall ===
- Biggest home victory: 8–1 v Annan Athletic, 24 January 1998 (Scottish Cup)
- Biggest away victory: 0–9 v Dumbarton, 16 December 2025 (Scottish Challenge Cup)
- Biggest home defeat: 0–5 v Dundee United, 9 March 2014 (Scottish Cup)
- Biggest away defeat: 6–0 v Airdrie, 22 September 2001 (First Division); 6–0 v Celtic, 22 September 2010 (League Cup); 6–0 v Celtic, 27 April 2014 (Premiership) and 6–0 v Celtic, 11 February 2017 (Scottish Cup) 6–0 v Dundee, 27 July 2024 (League Cup)
- Goal milestones: The club's 1000th goal was scored on Saturday 9 February 2008 by club captain at the time, Grant Munro in a 1–1 draw away to St Mirren.
- Clean sheet record: 708 minutes – between 23 September and 25 November 2017.
- Longest winning streak (league): 11 games – between 16 November 1996 and 15 February 1997.
- Longest unbeaten streak (league): 25 games – between 17 March 2018 and 1 December 2018.
- Longest losing streak (league): 8 games – between 29 November 2008 and 24 January 2009.
- Longest winless streak (league): 14 games – between 29 October 2016 and 18 February 2017.

=== League ===
- Record home victory: 6–1 v Albion Rovers (1995–96), Gretna (2007–08), and Cove Rangers (2022–23); and 5–0 v St Mirren (1999–2000), Raith Rovers (2000–01), Arbroath (2001–02), Brechin City (2003–04) and Greenock Morton (2019–20)
- Record away victory: 0–7 v Ayr United (2009–10)
- Record home defeat: 1–5 v Airdrieonians (1999–2000), Ross County (2002–03), and Motherwell (2012–13); and 0–4 v Queen's Park (1994–95) and Montrose (1994–95)
- Record away defeat: 6–0 v Airdrieonians (2001–02) and Celtic (2013–14)
- Highest all-time finish: 3rd, Scottish Premiership (2014–15)
- Lowest all-time finish: 6th, Scottish Third Division (1994–95)
- First season in top flight: 2004–05 Scottish Premier League
- Last season in top flight: 2016–17 Scottish Premiership

=== Europa League ===
- Best run: Second Qualifying Round: 2015–16 (lost 0–1 on aggregate to Astra Giurgiu).
- Worst run: Second Qualifying Round: 2015–16 (lost 0–1 on aggregate to Astra Giurgiu).
- Biggest victory: N/A
- Biggest defeat: 0–1 v Astra Giurgiu, 16 July 2015.

=== Scottish Cup ===
- Best run: Winners: 2014–15 (won 2–1 against Falkirk).
- Worst run: First round: 1994–95 (lost 1–2 at home to Queen of the South).
- Record victory: 8–1 v Annan Athletic, 1997–98, 24 January 1998.
- Record defeat: 6–0 v Celtic, 2016–17, 11 February 2017.

=== Scottish League Cup ===
- Best run: Final: 2013–14 (lost 2–4 on penalties after 0–0 draw (aet), to Aberdeen).
- Worst run: First round/Group Stage; (8): 1995–96 (lost 3–5 on penalties after 1–1 draw (aet), (1–1 after 90 mins) away to Berwick Rangers), 2003–04 (lost 1–2 at home to Queen's Park), 2017–18, 2018–19, 2019–20, 2020–21, 2021–22, 2023–24, 2024–25.
- Record victory: 7–0 v Arbroath, 2016–17, 30 July 2016.
- Record defeat: 6–0 v Celtic, 2010–11, 22 September 2010 and 6–0 v Dundee, 2024–25, 27 July 2024.

=== Scottish Challenge Cup ===
- Best run: Winners; (3): 2003–04 (won 2–0 against Airdrieonians), 2017–18 (won 1–0 against Dumbarton) and 2019–20 (shared with Raith Rovers).
- Worst run: First round; (4): 1995–96 (lost 1–2 away to Alloa Athletic), 1997–98 (lost 0–2 at home to Queen of the South), 2002–03 (lost 0–1 away to Berwick Rangers) and 2018–19 (lost 1–2 at home to Dunfermline Athletic).
- Record victory: 0–9 v Dumbarton, 2025–26, 16 December 2025.
- Record defeat: 3–0 v Arbroath, 2016–17, 2 August 2016. (U20s Squad)

=== Miscellaneous ===
- Last SFL goal of the old millennium and first SFL goal of the new millennium: Barry Wilson against Clydebank (27 December 1999) and Livingston (3 January 2000) respectively.
- Longest name in professional football in the United Kingdom.

== European record ==
Venue	Wins	Draw	Loss	Goals for	Goals against
Home	0	0	1	0	1
Neutral	0	0	0	0	0
Away	0	1	0	0	0

=== Matches ===
Season	Competition	Round	Club	Home	Away	Aggregate
2015–16	UEFA Europa League	2Q	(Romania) Astra Giurgiu	0–1	0–0	0–1

Notes

- 2Q: Second qualifying round
