= Iain Stewart (footballer) =

Scottish footballer and manager

Iain Stewart (born 23 October 1969) is a Scottish former football player and manager.
