= 2003 Scottish Challenge Cup final =

- Event: 2003–04 Scottish Challenge Cup
| Inverness Caledonian Thistle | Airdrie United |
| 2 | 0 |
- Date: 26 October 2003
- Venue: McDiarmid Park, Perth
- Referee: Willie Young
- Attendance: 5,428

The 2003 Scottish Challenge Cup final was played on 26 October 2003, at McDiarmid Park in Perth and was the 13th staging of the final in the history of the tournament. It was played between Inverness Caledonian Thistle of the First Division and Airdrie United of the Second Division. Inverness Caledonian Thistle emerged winners after defeating Airdrie United 2–0 to win the competition for the first time.

== Route to the final ==
=== Inverness Caledonian Thistle ===
| Round | Opposition | Score |
|---|---|---|
| First round | Gretna (a) | 5–0 |
| Second round | Peterhead (a) | 2–1 |
| Quarter-final | Ross County (h) | 1–0 |
| Semi-final | Raith Rovers (a) | 4–0 |

The first round draw saw Inverness Caledonian Thistle travel to Raydale Park to face Gretna with Caley Thistle emerging 5–0 victors. The second round was another away game with Peterhead providing the opposition, Inverness won 2–1 to progress to the quarter-finals. A home game at the Caledonian Stadium against rivals Ross County was the reward for reaching the quarter-finals, with the home side edging out the opposition to win 1–0. The semi-final draw paired the club with Raith Rovers away from home at Stark's Park. Inverness Caledonian Thistle triumphed to win 4–0 and book a place in the Scottish Challenge Cup final for the second time after losing the 1999 final to Alloa Athletic.

=== Airdrie United ===
| Round | Opposition | Score |
|---|---|---|
| First round | Montrose (h) | 2–0 |
| Second round | Greenock Morton (a) | 2–1 |
| Quarter-final | Forfar Athletic (a) | 2–0 |
| Semi-final | Brechin City (a) | 2–1 (a.e.t.) |

Airdrie United were drawn against Montrose at home in the first round and produced a 2–0 victory over the club. The second round saw United drawn against Greenock Morton away from home at Cappielow and produced 2–1 win to progress to the quarter-finals. Another away game awaited Airdrie United in the quarter-finals as they were drawn against Forfar Athletic which saw the club produce a 2–0 win and a second clean sheet of the tournament to progress to the semi-finals. The opposition provided was Brechin City at Glebe Park, again away from home with Airdrie United emerging 2–1 winners after extra time. Airdrie United reached the Scottish Challenge Cup final for the first time in the club's history.

== Pre-match ==
=== Analysis ===
Inverness Caledonian Thistle scored a total of twelve goals in the rounds preceding the final whilst conceding only one goal in the process. Compared with Airdrie United who scored eight goals in total and conceded two, although only managing two clean sheets compared to Inverness Caledonian Thistle's three. Both teams played three games away from their respective homes of Caledonian Stadium and New Broomfield, whilst only playing one home game each. Inverness Caledonian Thistle reached the Scottish Challenge Cup final for the second time in its history after losing on penalties in the 1999 final to Alloa Athletic after a 4–4 draw after extra time, whereas it was Airdrie United's first time in the final under their new identity.

== Match details ==
26 October 2003
15:00

| Inverness Caledonian Thistle | 2 – 0 | Airdrie United |
|---|---|---|
| Bingham 79'; Hislop 89' | Report |

McDiarmid Park, Perth
Attendance: 5,428
Referee: Willie Young

INVERNESS CALEDONIAN THISTLE:
| GK | 1 | (Scotland) Mark Brown |
| DF | 2 | (Scotland) Ross Tokely |
| DF | 3 | (Scotland) Stuart Golabek |
| DF | 4 | (Scotland) Bobby Mann (c) |
| DF | 5 | (Scotland) Stuart McCaffrey |
| MF | 6 | (Scotland) Russell Duncan |
| MF | 7 | (Scotland) Barry Wilson |
| MF | 8 | (Scotland) Richie Hart | (substituted off) 86' |
| FW | 9 | (Scotland) Paul Ritchie | (substituted off) 58' |
| MF | 10 | (Scotland) Roy McBain |
| FW | 11 | (Scotland) David Bingham | (substituted off) 90' |
Substitutes:
| DF | 12 | (Scotland) Grant Munro |
| MF | 14 | (Scotland) Darran Thomson | (substituted in) 90' |
| FW | 15 | (Scotland) Steven Hislop | (substituted in) 58' |
| FW | 16 | (Scotland) Liam Keogh | (substituted in) 86' |
| GK | 17 | (Scotland) Michael Fraser |
Manager:
(Scotland) John Robertson

AIRDRIE UNITED:
| GK | 1 | (Scotland) Mark McGeown |
| DF | 2 | (Scotland) Stephen Docherty (c) | (substituted off) 64' |
| DF | 3 | (Scotland) Sandy Stewart |
| DF | 4 | (Scotland) Scott Wilson | (substituted off) 73' |
| DF | 5 | (Scotland) Allan McManus |
| MF | 6 | (Scotland) Willie Wilson |
| FW | 7 | (France) Jerome Vareille | (substituted off) 83' |
| MF | 8 | (Scotland) Marvyn Wilson |
| FW | 9 | (Scotland) Mark Roberts |
| MF | 10 | (Scotland) David Dunn |
| MF | 11 | (Scotland) Alan Gow |
Substitutes:
| FW | 12 | (Scotland) Paul Ronald | (substituted in) 73' |
| DF | 14 | (Benin) Felicien Singbo | (substituted in) 64' |
| MF | 15 | (Scotland) Stephen McKeown | (substituted in) 83' |
| FW | 16 | (Scotland) Martin Glancy |
| GK | 17 | (Scotland) Lee Hollis |
Manager:
(Scotland) Sandy Stewart

MATCH RULES

- 90 minutes
- 30 minutes of extra time if necessary
- Penalty shootout if scores still level
- Five named substitutes
- Maximum of 3 substitutions
