= 2011–12 Arbroath F.C. season =

Arbroath
2011–12 season
- Chairman: John Christison
- Manager: Paul Sheerin
- Stadium: Gayfield Park
- Scottish Second Division: Second place
- Challenge Cup: Round one
- League Cup: Round one
- Scottish Cup: Round four
- Top goalscorer: League: Steven Doris (21); All: Steven Doris (21)
- Highest home attendance: 1,125 vs. Cowdenbeath, 18 February 2012
- Lowest home attendance: 572 vs. Stenhousemuir, 29 October 2011

The 2011–12 season was Arbroath's first season back in the Scottish Second Division, having been promoted from the Scottish Third Division at the end of the 2010–11 season. Arbroath also competed in the Challenge Cup, League Cup and the Scottish Cup.

== Summary ==
Arbroath finished second in the Second Division, entering the play-offs losing 2–1 to Dumbarton on aggregate in the semi-final and remained in the Second Division. They reached the first round of the Challenge Cup, the first round of the League Cup and the fourth round of the Scottish Cup, losing 4–0 to Scottish Premier League side Rangers.

== Results and fixtures ==
Win Draw Loss Postponed

=== Second Division ===
6 August 2011 Second Division	Arbroath	6–2	Albion Rovers	Gayfield Park
15:00	Sheerin 7' (pen.), 58' (pen.); Sibanda 29'; Malcolm 46'; McAnespie 51'; Bryce 80'	BBC Report	Boyle 31', 37' Gaston (red card) Grant Fahey (red card)	Attendance: 661; Referee: Beaton

13 August 2011 Second Division	Stenhousemuir	2–0	Arbroath	Ochilview Park
	Ferguson 13'; Rodgers 56'	BBC Report		Attendance: 492; Referee: Hilland

20 August 2011 Second Division	Arbroath	3–0	East Fife	Gayfield Park
	Swankie 28'; Doris 69', 81' (pen.); Sheerin 56'	BBC Report		Attendance: 723; Referee: McKendrick

27 August 2011 Second Division	Arbroath	4–2	Stirling Albion	Gayfield Park
	McPherson 30' (og.); Doris 51' (pen.); Sheerin 56'; Swankie 65'	BBC Report	Cook 38'; Dillon 49'; Thom (red card)	Attendance: 670; Referee: Clancy

10 September 2011 Second Division	Dumbarton	3–4	Arbroath	Strathclyde Homes Stadium
15:00	Prunty 5'; Gilhaney 17'; Nicholl 38'	BBC Report	Sibanda 14'; Swankie 27' (46); Doris 68' (pen.)	Attendance: 640; Referee: Finnie

17 September 2011 Second Division	Arbroath	3–1	Airdrie United	Gayfield Park
	McAnespie 6'; Doris 63'; Swankie 90'	BBC Sport	Owens 65'	Attendance: 761; Referee: Colvin

24 September 2011 Second Division	Brechin City	2–3	Arbroath	Glebe Park
	Buist 29'; McManus 82' (pen.)	BBC Report	Sibanda 36'; Doris 78' (pen.); Swankie 88'	Attendance: 911; Referee: Hilland

1 October 2011 Second Division	Arbroath	1–1	Cowdenbeath	Gayfield Park
	Falkingham 58'	BBC Report	O'Brien 19'	Attendance: 857; Referee: McDermott

15 October 2011 Second Division	Forfar Athletic	1–1	Arbroath	Station Park
15:00	Bolochoweckyj (yellow card) 35' (red card); Shaughnessy 82'	BBC Report	Sibanda 12'	Attendance: 908; Referee: Roache

22 October 2011 Second Division	Albion Rovers	1–0	Arbroath	Cliftonhill
	Gemmell 13'	BBC Report		Attendance: 338; Referee: Beaton

29 October 2011 Second Division	Arbroath	1–0	Stenhousemuir	Gayfield Park
	Doris 84' (pen.)	BBC Report	McCluskey (red card) 82'	Attendance: 572; Referee: Salmond

5 November 2011 Second Division	Arbroath	4–3	Dumbarton	Gayfield Park
	McAnespie 21'; Malcolm 23'; Swankie 26'; Doris 79'	BBC Report	McNiff 51', 83'; Agnew 65'	Attendance: 723; Referee: Northcroft

12 November 2011 Second Division	Stirling Albion	0–1	Arbroath	Doubletree Dunblane Stadium
		BBC Report	Malcolm 90'	Attendance: 573; Referee: Allan

26 November 2011 Second Division	Airdrie United	3–3	Arbroath	Excelsior Stadium
	Lovering 6' (Penalty); Donnelly 68', 71'	BBC Report	Swankie 2'; Doris 42' (Penalty); Falkingham 56'	Attendance: 687; Referee: Richmond

3 December 2011 Second Division	Arbroath	1–1	Brechin City	Gayfield Park
15:00	Falkingham 63'	SFL Report	McManus 90'	Attendance: 1,104; Referee: Hilland

10 December 2011 Second Division	Cowdenbeath	0–0	Arbroath	Central Park
		SFL Report		Attendance: 437; Referee: Winter

17 December 2011 Second Division	Arbroath	P–P	Forfar Athletic	Gayfield Park

26 December 2011 Second Division	Arbroath	P–P	Stirling Albion	Gayfield Park
15:00		SFL Report		Referee: McDermott

2 January 2012 Second Division	Dumbarton	3–2	Arbroath	Strathclyde Homes Stadium
15:00	Prunty 20'; Lithgow 84'; Walker 90'	SFL Report	Doris 26'; Falkingham 32'	Attendance: 585; Referee: Roache

14 January 2012 Second Division	East Fife	2–2	Arbroath	Bayview Stadium
15:00	Cook 6'; Hislop 52'	SFL Report	Malcolm 31'; Swankie 78'	Attendance: 617; Referee: Hilland

21 January 2012 Second Division	Arbroath	6–1	Albion Rovers	Gayfield Park
15:00	Sibanda 5'; Swankie 28', 56'; Falkingham 34'; Sheerin 85'; Samuel 90'	SFL Report	Gemmell 24'	Attendance: 616; Referee: Clancy

28 January 2012 Second Division	Brechin City	P–P	Arbroath	Glebe Park
15:00

1 February 2012 Second Division	Arbroath	2–0	Stirling Albion	Gayfield Park
19:45	Doris 9'; Sheerin 45'	SFL Report		Attendance: 901; Referee: Charleston

4 February 2012 Second Division	Arbroath	P–P	Airdrie United	Gayfield Park
15:00

11 February 2012 Second Division	Forfar Athletic	2–4	Arbroath	Station Park
15:00	Fotheringham 80', 89'	SFL Report	Malcolm 17'; Samuel 41'; Sibanda 75'; Sheerin 82'	Attendance: 794; Referee: McKendrick

14 February 2012 Second Division	Brechin City	1–1	Arbroath	Glebe Park
15:00	McLean 81'	SFL Report	Doris 71'	Attendance: 703; Referee: Beaton

18 February 2012 Second Division	Arbroath	1–1	Cowdenbeath	Gayfield Park
15:00	Innes 42'	SFL Report	McKenzie 60'; Linton (red card) 43'	Attendance: 1,125; Referee: Roache

22 February 2012 Second Division	Arbroath	4–1	Forfar Athletic	Gayfield Park
19:45	Samuel 20'; Doris 44', 45', 72'	SFL Report	Coyne 13'	Attendance: 789; Referee: Conroy

25 February 2012 Second Division	Stenhousemuir	1–3	Arbroath	Ochilview Park
15:00	Kean 70'	SFL Report	Doris 9'; Falkingham 37', 88'	Referee: Madden

29 February 2012 Second Division	Arbroath	2–2	Airdrie United	Gayfield Park
19:45	Gibson 9', 42'	SFL Report	Holmes 49'; Boyle 78'	Attendance: 728; Referee: Colvin

3 March 2012 Second Division	Arbroath	2–2	East Fife	Gayfield Park
15:00	Caddis 6', 15'	SFL Report	Sloan 28'; Hislop 43'; White (yellow card) 95' (red card)	Attendance: 842; Referee: Tumilty

10 March 2012 Second Division	Arbroath	2–0	Dumbarton	Gayfield Park
15:00	Innes 24'; Doris 27'	SFL Report		Attendance: 842; Referee: Northcroft

17 March 2012 Second Division	Stirling Albion	1–1	Arbroath	Doubletree Dunblane Stadium
15:00	Davidson 20'	SFL Report	Falkingham 89'	Attendance: 537; Referee: McLean

24 March 2012 Second Division	Airdrie United	2–0	Arbroath	Excelsior Stadium
15:00	Lovering 73'; McLaren 90'	SFL Report		Attendance: 689; Referee: Hilland

31 March 2012 Second Division	Arbroath	2–3	Brechin City	Gayfield Park
15:00	Doris 21' (pen.); Gibson (red card) 85'	SFL Report	McKenzie 6'; McManus 14', 65'	Attendance: 917; Referee: Somers

7 April 2012 Second Division	Cowdenbeath	2–3	Arbroath	Central Park
15:00	McKenzie 5', 47' (Penalty); Adamson (yellow card) 24' (red card)	SFL Report	Doris 25', 75'; McAnespie 29'	Attendance: 671; Referee: Salmond

14 April 2012 Second Division	Arbroath	0–1	Forfar Athletic	Gayfield Park
15:00		SFL Report	Ross 60'	Attendance: 998; Referee: Allan

21 April 2012 Second Division	Albion Rovers	1–1	Arbroath	Cliftonhill
15:00	Love 49'	SFL Report	Sibanda 72'	Attendance: 407; Referee: Robertson

28 April 2012 Second Division	Arbroath	0–2	Stenhousemuir	Gayfield Park
15:00		SFL Report	Anderson 11'; Rodgers 20'	Attendance: 643; Referee: Northcroft

5 May 2012 Second Division	East Fife	1–3	Arbroath	Bayview Stadium
15:00	Muir 90'	SFL Report	Samuel 8'; Caddis 29'; Sibanda 72'	Attendance: 597; Referee: O'Reilly

=== First Division play-offs ===
9 May 2012 Play-offs SF R1	Dumbarton	2–1	Arbroath	Dumbarton Football Stadium
19:30	Wallace 16'; Prunty 61'	SFL Report	Malcolm 6'	Attendance: 911; Referee: Charleston

12 May 2012 Play-offs SF R2	Arbroath	0–0 (2–1 agg.)	Dumbarton	Gayfield Park
15:00		SFL Report		Attendance: 1,454; Referee: Thomson

=== Scottish Cup ===
19 November 2011 Scottish Cup round 3	Keith	0–1	Arbroath	Kynoch Park
	Niddrie (yellow card) 95' (red card)	BBC Report	Sheerin 94' (Penalty)	Attendance: 350; Referee: Somers

8 January 2012 Scottish Cup round 4	Arbroath	0–4	Rangers	Gayfield Park
12:45		BBC Report	Healy 17'; Wedderburn 22' (Own Goal); Jelavić 59'; Kerkar 77'	Referee: Murray

=== Challenge Cup ===
23 July 2011 Challenge Cup Rd 1	Arbroath	1–2 (a.e.t.)	Dundee	Gayfield Park
	Elfverson 77'	BBC Report	Milne 79'; O'Donnell 92'	Attendance: 1,761; Referee: Charleston

=== League Cup ===
30 July 2011 Scottish League Cup Rd 1	Livingston	6–0 (a.e.t.)	Arbroath	Almondvale Stadium
	Boulding 2'; Russell 7' (22); Jacobs 33'; Talbot 66'; McNulty 72'	BBC Report	Doris (red card)	Attendance: 804; Referee: Allan

=== Squad ===
Last updated 13 May 2012

No.	Pos	Nat	Player	Total		Second Division		Scottish Cup		League Cup		Other^{[a]}	
No.	Pos	Nat	Player	Apps	Goals	Apps	Goals	Apps	Goals	Apps	Goals	Apps	Goals
	GK	(Scotland) SCO	Darren Hill	41	0	35	0	2	0	1	0	3	0
	GK	(Scotland) SCO	Michael White	1	0	1	0	0	0	0	0	0	0
	DF	(Scotland) SCO	Mark Baxter	35	0	29	0	2	0	1	0	3	0
	DF	(Australia) AUS	Beau Busch	22	0	20	0	1	0	0	0	1	0
	DF	(Scotland) SCO	Graham Girvan	7	0	6	0	0	0	1	0	0	0
	DF	(Scotland) SCO	Stuart Malcolm	36	6	31	5	1	0	1	0	3	1
	DF	(Scotland) SCO	Kieran McAnespie	31	4	25	4	2	0	1	0	3	0
	DF	(Scotland) SCO	Craig Wedderburn	30	0	27	0	2	0	1	0	0	0
	DF	(Scotland) SCO	Connaire Connelly	1	0	1	0	0	0	0	0	0	0
	DF	(Scotland) SCO	Chris Innes	14	2	12	2	0	0	0	0	2	0
	MF	(Iran) IRN	Pedram Ardalany	10	0	10	0	0	0	0	0	0	0
	MF	(England) ENG	Josh Falkingham	41	8	35	8	2	0	1	0	3	0
	MF	(Scotland) SCO	Keith Gibson	33	2	27	2	2	0	1	0	3	0
	MF	(Scotland) SCO	Brian Kerr	41	0	35	0	2	0	1	0	3	0
	MF	(Scotland) SCO	Paul Sheerin	33	7	29	6	2	1	0	0	2	0
	MF	(Scotland) SCO	Martin Strachan	3	0	1	0	0	0	1	0	1	0
	MF	(Scotland) SCO	Kevin Brown	9	0	9	0	0	0	0	0	0	0
	MF	(Scotland) SCO	Carlo Monti	2	0	2	0	0	0	0	0	0	0
	MF	(Scotland) SCO	Liam Caddis	23	3	20	3	1	0	0	0	2	0
	MF	(Scotland) SCO	Connor Birse	3	0	2	0	0	0	0	0	1	0
	FW	(Scotland) SCO	Lee Bryce	14	1	10	1	2	0	1	0	1	0
	FW	(Scotland) SCO	Steven Doris	39	21	33	21	2	0	1	0	3	0
	FW	(Scotland) SCO	Jordan Elfverson	8	1	5	0	1	0	1	0	1	1
	FW	(Scotland) SCO	Jake Mair	3	0	3	0	0	0	0	0	0	0
	FW	(Scotland) SCO	Lee Sibanda	39	8	34	8	2	0	1	0	2	0
	FW	(Scotland) SCO	Gavin Swankie	38	11	34	11	2	0	0	0	2	0
	FW	(Trinidad and Tobago) TRI	Collin Samuel	15	4	13	4	0	0	0	0	2	0
	FW	(Scotland) SCO	Kieran McWalter	1	0	1	0	0	0	0	0	0	0
	FW	(Scotland) SCO	Dale Robertson	1	0	1	0	0	0	0	0	0	0

a. Includes other competitive competitions, including the play-offs and the 2011–12 Scottish Challenge Cup.

=== Disciplinary record ===
Includes all competitive matches.

Last updated 13 May 2012

Nation	Position	Name	Second Division		Scottish Cup		League Cup		Other		Total	
Nation	Position	Name	Booked	Sent off (straight red)	Booked	Sent off (straight red)	Booked	Sent off (straight red)	Booked	Sent off (straight red)	Booked	Sent off (straight red)
(Scotland)	GK	Darren Hill	0	0	0	0	0	0	1	0	1	0
(Scotland)	GK	Michael White	0	0	0	0	0	0	0	0	0	0
(Scotland)	DF	Mark Baxter	3	0	1	0	0	0	0	0	4	0
(Australia)	DF	Beau Busch	1	0	0	0	0	0	0	0	1	0
(Scotland)	DF	Graham Girvan	2	0	0	0	0	0	0	0	2	0
(Scotland)	DF	Stuart Malcolm	10	0	1	0	0	0	1	0	12	0
(Scotland)	DF	Kieran McAnespie	4	0	0	0	0	0	1	0	5	0
(Scotland)	DF	Craig Wedderburn	6	0	0	0	0	0	0	0	6	0
(Scotland)	DF	Connaire Connelly	0	0	0	0	0	0	0	0	0	0
(Scotland)	DF	Chris Innes	2	0	0	0	0	0	1	0	3	0
(Scotland)	MF	Pedram Ardallany	2	0	0	0	0	0	0	0	2	0
(Scotland)	MF	Josh Falkingham	8	0	0	0	0	0	0	0	8	0
(Scotland)	MF	Keith Gibson	3	1	0	0	0	0	0	0	3	1
(Scotland)	MF	Brian Kerr	3	0	0	0	0	0	0	0	3	0
(Scotland)	MF	Paul Sheerin	4	0	0	0	1	0	1	0	6	0
(Scotland)	MF	Martin Strachan	0	0	0	0	0	0	0	0	0	0
(Scotland)	MF	Kevin Brown	0	0	0	0	0	0	0	0	0	0
(Scotland)	MF	Liam Caddis	2	0	0	0	0	0	0	0	2	0
(Scotland)	MF	Connor Birse	0	0	0	0	0	0	0	0	0	0
(Scotland)	FW	Lee Bryce	1	0	1	0	0	0	0	0	2	0
(Scotland)	FW	Steven Doris	4	0	0	0	0	0	0	1	4	1
(Scotland)	FW	Jordan Elfverson	1	0	0	0	0	0	0	0	1	0
(Scotland)	FW	Jake Mair	1	0	0	0	0	0	0	0	1	0
(Scotland)	FW	Lee Sibanda	6	0	0	0	1	0	1	0	8	0
(Scotland)	FW	Gavin Swankie	4	0	0	0	0	0	0	0	4	0
(Trinidad and Tobago)	FW	Collin Samuel	0	0	0	0	0	0	0	0	0	0
(Scotland)	FW	Kieran McWalter	0	0	0	0	0	0	0	0	0	0
(Scotland)	FW	Dale Robertson	0	0	0	0	0	0	0	0	0	0

=== Awards ===
Last updated 28 March 2012

Nation	Name	Award	Month
(Scotland)	Paul Sheerin	Second Division Manager of the Month	August
(Scotland)	Steven Doris	Player of the Month	February

== Team statistics ==
=== League table ===
Pos	Team	Pld	W	D	L	GF	GA	GD	Pts	Promotion, qualification or relegation
1	Cowdenbeath (C, P)	36	20	11	5	68	29	+39	71	Promotion to the First Division
2	Arbroath	36	17	12	7	76	51	+25	63	Qualification for the First Division play-offs
3	Dumbarton (O, P)	36	17	7	12	61	61	0	58 (Note: Dumbarton won the First Division play-off final, and were promoted to the First Division.)	Qualification for the First Division play-offs
4	Airdrie United (P)	36	14	10	12	68	60	+8	52 (Note: Airdrie United lost the final of the First Division playoffs to Dumbarton. However following the demotion of Rangers to the third division prior to the beginning of the 2012-13 season, Dundee were promoted from the First Division to the SPL, and Airdrie United were promoted to the First Division to take their place. Stranraer were promoted from the Third to the Second Division to take the place of Airdrie United)	Qualification for the First Division play-offs
5	Stenhousemuir	36	15	6	15	54	49	+5	51	

Source: SPFL Archive
Rules for classification: 1) points; 2) goal difference; 3) number of goals scored.
(C) Champions; (O) Play-off winners; (P) Promoted

== Transfers ==
=== Players in ===
Player	From	Fee
(Scotland) Craig Wedderburn	(Scotland) Raith Rovers	Free
(Scotland) Lee Bryce	(Scotland) Raith Rovers	Free
(Scotland) Brian Kerr	Unattached	Free
(Scotland) Michael White	(Scotland) Dumbarton	Free
(Scotland) Graham Girvan	(Scotland) Clyde	Free
(Australia) Beau Busch	(Australia) Manly United	Free
(Scotland) Mark Baxter	(Scotland) Arbroath	Free
(Scotland) Jordan Elfverson	(Scotland) Dundee United	Free
(Scotland) Kevin Brown	(Iceland) BÍ/Bolungarvík	Free
(Iran) Pedram Ardalany	(Scotland) Arthurlie	Free
(Scotland) Liam Caddis	(Scotland) St Johnstone	Loan
(Trinidad and Tobago) Collin Samuel	(England) Luton Town	Free
(Scotland) Chris Innes	(Scotland) Inverness Caledonian Thistle	Free

=== Players out ===
Player	To	Fee
(Scotland) Ross Chisholm	(Scotland) Dundee	Free
(Scotland) David Dimilta	(Scotland) Montrose	Free
(Scotland) Jordyn Sheerin	(Scotland) East Stirlingshire	Free
(Scotland) Alan Rattray	(Scotland) Peterhead	Free
(Scotland) David McGowan	(Scotland) Montrose	Free
(Scotland) Kevin McMullan	(Scotland) St Andrews	Free
(Scotland) Adam Strachan	(Scotland) Clydebank	Free
(Scotland) Patrick Deane	(Scotland) Jeanfield Swifts	Free
(Northern Ireland) Danny Griffin	Free agent	Free
(Scotland) Jay Shields	(Scotland) Bo'ness United	Free
(Scotland) Darran Thomson	(Scotland) Spartans	Free
(Scotland) Kevin Brown	(Scotland) Montrose	Loan
(Scotland) Lee Bryce	Free agent	Free
(Scotland) Pedram Ardalany	(Scotland) Arthurlie	Free
(Scotland) Graham Girvan	(Scotland) Petershill	Loan
