= 2003–04 Inverness Caledonian Thistle F.C. season =

Scottish football club season

Inverness Caledonian Thistle F.C.
2003-04 season
- Manager: John Robertson
- Scottish First Division: 1st - Winners
- Scottish Cup: Semi-final
- Scottish League Cup: 1st Round
- Scottish Challenge Cup: Winners
- Top goalscorer: League: Paul Ritchie (14); All: Paul Ritchie (23)
- Highest home attendance: 6,092 vs. St Johnstone, 15 May 2004
- Lowest home attendance: 667 vs. Queen's Park, 2 September 2003

Inverness Caledonian Thistle F.C. in their tenth season in the Scottish Football League competed in the Scottish First Division, Scottish League Cup, Scottish Challenge Cup and the Scottish Cup in season 2003–04. They won their first major trophy when they won the Challenge Cup beating Airdrie United in the final 2–0 with goals from Steve Hislop and David Bingham, and at the end of the season, they won the First Division Championship, securing promotion to the Scottish Premier League. However, SPL rules at that time stated that all member clubs must have a stadium with a minimum capacity of 10,000 seats. Caledonian Stadium did not and this left the club's board with a dilemma: either to stay in the First Division like Falkirk the previous season or to groundshare with Aberdeen's Pittodrie Stadium, over 100 miles (160 km) away. After consulting with supporters, the board decided the sacrifice of one season in Aberdeen would be worthwhile for Premier League football.

== Results ==
=== Scottish First Division ===
Match Day	Date	Opponent	H/A	Score	ICT Scorer(s)	Attendance
1	3 August	Falkirk	A	1-2	McCaffrey	2,596
2	16 August	Clyde	H	0–0		1,839
3	23 August	St Johnstone	A	2–1	Bingham, Hislop	3,031
4	30 August	Ross County	A	1–1	Mann	5,020
5	13 September	Ayr United	A	1–0	Ritchie	1,476
6	20 September	Brechin City	A	2–0	McBain, Ritchie	652
7	27 September	St Mirren	H	2–0	Ritchie, McCaffrey	1,896
8	4 October	Raith Rovers	H	2–1	Tokely, McCaffrey	1,707
9	18 October	Queen of the South	A	2–3	Ritchie, Bingham	3,547
10	1 November	Falkirk	H	1–2	Hughes (own goal)	2,223
11	5 November	Clyde	A	0–1		765
12	8 November	Ayr United	A	3–0	Golabek, Hart, Hislop	1,464
13	14 November	Ross County	H	3–3	Bingham, Hislop, Wilson	3,523
14	22 November	St Mirren	A	4–0	Bingham (2), McBain (2)	2,204
15	29 November	Brechin City	H	5–0	Tokely (2), Hislop, Keogh, Wilson	1,393
16	6 December	Queen of the South	H	4–1	Hislop (2), McCaffrey, Wilson	1,745
17	13 December	Raith Rovers	A	3–1	Munro, Bingham, Ritchie	1,432
18	27 December	St Johnstone	H	1-0	Wilson	2,949
19	3 January	Ross County	A	0-1		6,120
20	17 January	Ayr United	H	2–1	Ritchie, Bingham	1,443
21	24 January	Brechin City	A	4–2	Thomson, Ritchie, Bingham, Duncan	667
22	31 January	St Mirren	H	1–1	Bingham	1,913
23	14 February	Raith Rovers	H	3–0	Bingham, Keogh, Wilson	1,879
24	21 February	Queen of the South	A	1–2	Ritchie	2,021
25	2 March	Falkirk	A	1–2	Ritchie	2,268
26	13 March	St Johnstone	A	2-3	Ritchie (2)	2,913
27	16 March	Clyde	H	3–1	Ritchie, Bingham, Wilson	2,645
28	20 March	Ayr United	A	1–1	Wilson	1,207
29	27 March	Ross County	H	1–0	Wilson	4,019
30	3 April	St Mirren	A	0–0	Robson	2,272
31	13 April	Brechin City	H	1–0	Robson	1,248
32	17 April	Queen of the South	H	4–1	Hislop, Bingham, Wilson	6,755
33	24 April	Raith Rovers	A	1–0	Ritchie	1.748
34	1 May	Falkirk	H	0–0		8,750
35	8 May	Clyde	A	2–1	Keogh, Hislop	4,850
36	15 May	St Johnstone	H	3-1	Bingham, Wilson, Ritchie	6,092

==== Final League table ====
Pos	Team	Pld	W	D	L	GF	GA	GD	Pts	Promotion or relegation
1	Inverness CT (C, P)	36	21	7	8	67	33	+34	70	Promotion to the Premier League
2	Clyde	36	20	9	7	64	40	+24	69	
3	St Johnstone	36	15	12	9	59	45	+14	57	
4	Falkirk	36	15	10	11	43	37	+6	55	
5	Queen of the South	36	15	9	12	46	48	−2	54	

Source: "2003-2004 First Division - SPFL Archive". SPFL.
Rules for classification: 1) points; 2) goal difference; 3) number of goals scored.
(C) Champions; (P) Promoted

=== Scottish League Cup ===
Round	Date	Opponent	H/A	Score	ICT Scorer(s)	Attendance
R1	2 September	Queen's Park	H	1–2	Ritchie	968

=== Scottish Challenge Cup ===
Round	Date	Opponent	H/A	Score	ICT Scorer(s)	Attendance
R1	2 August	Gretna	A	5–0	Hart (2), Bingham, Hislop, Ritchie	528
R2	12 August	Peterhead	A	2–1	Hislop (2)	886
QF	26 August	Ross County	H	1–0	Hislop	2,631
SF	16 September	Raith Rovers	A	4–0	Wilson (2), Ritchie (2)	2,110
Final	20 April	Airdrie United	N	2–0	Bingham, Hislop	5,428

=== Scottish Cup ===
Round	Date	Opponent	H/A	Score	ICT Scorer(s)	Attendance
R3	10 January	Brechin City	H	5–1	Ritchie (3), Bingham, McBain	1,412
R4	7 February	St Mirren	A	1–0	Thomson	3,589
QF	6 March	Motherwell	A	1–0	Wilson	7,930
SF	10 April	Dunfermline Athletic	N	1–1	Ritchie	13,225
SF R	20 April	Dunfermline Athletic	N	2–3	Ritchie, Bingham	5,728

== Hat-tricks ==
Player	Competition	Score	Opponent	Date
(Scotland) Paul Ritchie	Scottish Cup	5–1	Brechin City	10 January 2004
