= Michael Fraser (footballer) =

Scottish footballer

Personal information
- Full name: Michael Alan Fraser
- Date of birth: 8 October 1983 (age 43)
- Place of birth: Inverness, Scotland
- Position: Goalkeeper

Senior career*
Years	Team	Apps	(Gls)
2002–2009	Inverness Caledonian Thistle	73	(0)
2009–2010	Motherwell	5	(0)
2010	Montrose	1	(0)
2010–2011	Birkirkara	15	(0)
2011–2014	Ross County	70	(0)
2014–2015	Elgin City	16	(0)
Total		180	(0)
- * Club domestic league appearances and goals

Michael Alan Fraser (born 8 October 1983) is a Scottish former football goalkeeper who is the Goalkeeping coach for Inverness Caledonian Thistle. During his career he played for Inverness Caledonian Thistle, Motherwell, Montrose, Birkirkara, Ross County and Elgin City.

== Club career ==
Fraser was born in Inverness, and signed for Inverness Caledonian Thistle in 2002. He was previously a talented shinty player with Glenurquhart Shinty Club but gave up the sport to pursue his professional ambitions. His first team breakthrough came when Mark Brown signed for Celtic in January 2007. Fraser made a memorable save in a 3–2 home win over Celtic the following season and was first-choice at Inverness until he conceded five goals against Rangers on 1 November 2008, after which he was dropped in favour of Ryan Esson.

Fraser signed a pre-contract with Motherwell on 19 January 2009, and joined the club in the summer. He made his Motherwell debut in the UEFA Europa League qualifying defeat against Llanelli but rarely featured for Motherwell due to the arrival of John Ruddy on loan from Everton. The following season new signing Darren Randolph took the position of first-choice goalkeeper during Motherwell's pre-season and UEFA Europa League matches, again confining Fraser to the bench. On 31 August 2010, Fraser was released by Motherwell as he did not feature in the clubs plans.

Fraser appeared as a trialist for Third Division team Montrose in a match against Albion Rovers. However, Fraser left the club only a few days after in search of full-time football, something that Montrose could not provide, despite being willing to sign the player permanently. On 11 October 2010, Fraser was registered with Maltese Premier League champions, Birkirkara. He left the club at the end of the season.

On 10 June 2011, Fraser returned to Scotland and joined Ross County of the First Division. In his first season at the club, he played in every league match as Ross County won the First Division and were promoted to the Scottish Premier League for the first time. It was confirmed on 21 May 2013, that Fraser had been handed a contract extension as a reward for the fifth-placed finish in the SPL. Fraser was released by the club in May 2014.

On 17 June 2014, Fraser signed a one-year contract with Elgin City.

In April 2015, Fraser retired from football and returned to playing shinty for Glenurquhart Shinty Club.

== Career statistics ==
As of 31 July 2015

Club	Season	League		Cup		League Cup		Other^{[A]}		Total	
Club	Season	Apps	Goals	Apps	Goals	Apps	Goals	Apps	Goals	Apps	Goals
Inverness	2002–03	0	0	0	0	0	0	0	0	0	0
Inverness	2003–04	0	0	0	0	0	0	0	0	0	0
Inverness	2004–05	2	0	0	0	0	0	0	0	2	0
Inverness	2005–06	1	0	0	0	0	0	0	0	1	0
Inverness	2006–07	16	0	2	0	0	0	0	0	18	0
Inverness	2007–08	36	0	1	0	2	0	0	0	39	0
Inverness	2008–09	18	0	1	0	0	0	0	0	19	0
Inverness	Total	73	0	4	0	2	0	0	0	79	0
Motherwell	2009–10	5	0	0	0	0	0	4	0	9	0
Motherwell	2010–11	0	0	0	0	0	0	0	0	0	0
Motherwell	Total	5	0	0	0	0	0	4	0	9	0
Montrose	2010–11	1	0	0	0	0	0	0	0	1	0
Birkirkara	2010–11	15	0	1	0	0	0	0	0	16	1
Ross County	2011–12	36	0	3	0	3	0	1	0	43	0
Ross County	2012–13	24	0	0	0	0	0	0	0	24	0
Ross County	2013–14	10	0	0	0	0	0	0	0	10	0
Ross County	Total	70	0	3	0	3	0	1	0	77	0
Elgin City	2014–15	16	0	4	0	1	0	1	0	22	0
Total		180	0	12	0	6	0	6	0	204	0

A. Other includes Scottish Challenge Cup and Europa League.
