= 2003–04 in Scottish football =

Football in Scotland
- Season: 2003–04

2003–04 in Scottish football

Premier League champions
- Celtic

First Division champions
- Inverness CT

Second Division champions
- Airdrie United

Third Division champions
- Stranraer

Scottish Cup winners
- Celtic

League Cup winners
- Livingston

Challenge Cup winners
- Inverness CT

Junior Cup winners
- Carnoustie Panmure

Teams in Europe
- Celtic, Dundee, Heart of Midlothian, Rangers

Scotland national team
- UEFA Euro 2004 qualifying

The 2003–04 season was the 107th season of competitive football in Scotland.

== League Competitions ==
=== Scottish Premier League ===
The 2003–04 Scottish Premier League season was won by Celtic with 98 points, 17 points ahead of closest challengers Rangers. Both Rangers and Celtic therefore gained the two UEFA Champions League places and Hearts got the UEFA Europa League place having finished third. Partick Thistle were relegated to the Scottish First Division, this however was decided by a tribunal as at the time Inverness's stadium did not meet the criteria for the SPL, as with Falkirk the previous season, however unlike Falkirk the SPL decided that Inverness were allowed to share a ground with Aberdeen.

Pos	Team	Pld	W	D	L	GF	GA	GD	Pts	Qualification or relegation (Note: Teams played each other three times (33 matches), before the league split into two groups (the top six and the bottom six) for the last five matches.)
1	Celtic (C)	38	31	5	2	105	25	+80	98	Qualification for the Champions League group stage
2	Rangers	38	25	6	7	76	33	+43	81	Qualification for the Champions League third qualifying round
3	Heart of Midlothian	38	19	11	8	56	40	+16	68	Qualification for the UEFA Cup first round (Note: As Celtic, the 2003–04 Scottish Cup winners, qualified for the UEFA Champions League via their league position, the place in the UEFA Cup was passed onto Dunfermline Athletic, the cup runners-up.)
4	Dunfermline Athletic	38	14	11	13	45	52	−7	53	Qualification for the UEFA Cup first round
5	Dundee United	38	13	10	15	47	60	−13	49	
6	Motherwell	38	12	10	16	42	49	−7	46	
7	Dundee	38	12	10	16	48	57	−9	46	
8	Hibernian	38	11	11	16	41	60	−19	44	Qualification for the UEFA Intertoto Cup second round (Note: Hibernian qualified for the 2004 UEFA Intertoto Cup as the highest placed team to apply to participate in the competition.)
9	Livingston	38	10	13	15	48	57	−9	43	
10	Kilmarnock	38	12	6	20	51	74	−23	42	
11	Aberdeen	38	9	7	22	39	63	−24	34	
12	Partick Thistle (R)	38	6	8	24	39	67	−28	26	Relegation to the Scottish First Division

Source: Scottish Professional Football League
Rules for classification: 1) Points; 2) Goal difference; 3) Goals scored
(C) Champions; (R) Relegated

=== Scottish First Division ===
Pos	Team	Pld	W	D	L	GF	GA	GD	Pts	Promotion or relegation
1	Inverness CT (C, P)	36	21	7	8	67	33	+34	70	Promotion to the Premier League
2	Clyde	36	20	9	7	64	40	+24	69	
3	St Johnstone	36	15	12	9	59	45	+14	57	
4	Falkirk	36	15	10	11	43	37	+6	55	
5	Queen of the South	36	15	9	12	46	48	−2	54	
6	Ross County	36	12	13	11	49	41	+8	49	
7	St Mirren	36	9	14	13	39	46	−7	41	
8	Raith Rovers	36	8	10	18	37	57	−20	34	
9	Ayr United (R)	36	6	13	17	37	58	−21	31	Relegation to the Second Division
10	Brechin City (R)	36	6	9	21	37	73	−36	27	Relegation to the Second Division

Source: "2003-2004 First Division - SPFL Archive". SPFL.
Rules for classification: 1) points; 2) goal difference; 3) number of goals scored.
(C) Champions; (P) Promoted; (R) Relegated

=== Scottish Second Division ===
Pos	Team	Pld	W	D	L	GF	GA	GD	Pts	Promotion or relegation
1	Airdrie United (C, P)	36	20	10	6	64	36	+28	70	Promotion to the First Division
2	Hamilton Academical (P)	36	18	8	10	70	47	+23	62	Promotion to the First Division
3	Dumbarton	36	18	6	12	56	41	+15	60	
4	Greenock Morton	36	16	11	9	66	58	+8	59	
5	Berwick Rangers	36	14	6	16	61	67	−6	48	
6	Forfar Athletic	36	12	11	13	49	57	−8	47	
7	Alloa Athletic	36	12	8	16	55	55	0	44	
8	Arbroath	36	11	10	15	41	57	−16	43	
9	East Fife (R)	36	11	8	17	38	45	−7	41	Relegation to the Third Division
10	Stenhousemuir (R)	36	7	4	25	28	65	−37	25	Relegation to the Third Division

Source: "2003-2004 Second Division - SPFL Archive". SPFL.
Rules for classification: 1) points; 2) goal difference; 3) number of goals scored.
(C) Champions; (P) Promoted; (R) Relegated

=== Scottish Third Division ===
Pos	Team	Pld	W	D	L	GF	GA	GD	Pts	Promotion
1	Stranraer (C, P)	36	24	7	5	87	30	+57	79	Promotion to the Second Division
2	Stirling Albion (P)	36	23	8	5	78	27	+51	77	Promotion to the Second Division
3	Gretna	36	20	8	8	59	39	+20	68	
4	Peterhead	36	18	7	11	67	37	+30	61	
5	Cowdenbeath	36	15	10	11	46	39	+7	55	
6	Montrose	36	12	12	12	52	63	−11	48	
7	Queen's Park	36	10	11	15	41	53	−12	41	
8	Albion Rovers	36	12	4	20	66	75	−9	40	
9	Elgin City	36	6	7	23	48	93	−45	25	
10	East Stirlingshire	36	2	2	32	30	118	−88	8	

Source: "2003-2004 Third Division - SPFL Archive". SPFL.
Rules for classification: 1) points; 2) goal difference; 3) number of goals scored.
(C) Champions; (P) Promoted

== Other honours ==
=== Cup honours ===
Competition	Winner	Score	Runner-up	Report
Scottish Cup 2003–04	Celtic	3 – 1	Dunfermline Athletic	Wikipedia article
League Cup 2003–04	Livingston	2 – 0	Hibernian	Wikipedia article
Challenge Cup 2003–04	Inverness CT	2 – 0	Airdrie United	Wikipedia article
Youth Cup	Kilmarnock	1 – 0	Rangers	
Junior Cup	Carnoustie Panmure	0 – 0 (4 – 1 pen.)	Tayport	

=== Individual honours ===
==== SPFA awards ====
Award	Winner	Club
Players' Player of the Year	(England) Chris Sutton	Celtic
Young Player of the Year	(Scotland) Stephen Pearson	Celtic

==== SFWA awards ====
Award	Winner	Club
Footballer of the Year	(Scotland) Jackie McNamara	Celtic
Young Player of the Year	(Scotland) Craig Gordon	Heart of Midlothian
Manager of the Year	(Northern Ireland) Martin O'Neill	Celtic

== Scottish clubs in Europe ==
=== Summary ===
Club	Competition(s)	Final round	Coef.
Rangers	UEFA Champions League	Group stage	5.50
Celtic	UEFA Champions League; UEFA Europa League	Group stage Quarter-finals	17.00
Heart of Midlothian	UEFA Europa League	Second round	5.00
Dundee	UEFA Europa League	First round	2.00

Average coefficient – 7.375

=== Rangers ===
Date	Venue	Opponents	Score	Rangers scorer(s)	Report
Champions League Third qualifying round
13 August	Ibrox Stadium, Glasgow (H)	(Denmark) FC Copenhagen	1–1	Peter Løvenkrands	BBC Sport
27 August	Parken Stadium, Copenhagen (A)	(Denmark) FC Copenhagen	2–1	Mikel Arteta (pen.), Shota Arveladze	BBC Sport
Champions League Group stage
16 September	Ibrox Stadium, Glasgow (H)	(Germany) VfB Stuttgart	2–1	Christian Nerlinger, Peter Løvenkrands	BBC Sport
1 October	Olympic Stadium (A)	(Greece) Panathinaikos	1–1	Emerson Moisés Costa	BBC Sport
22 October	Ibrox Stadium, Glasgow (H)	(England) Manchester United	0–1		BBC Sport
4 November	Old Trafford, Manchester (A)	(England) Manchester United	0–3		BBC Sport
26 November	Gottlieb-Daimler-Stadion, Stuttgart (A)	(Germany) VfB Stuttgart	0–1		BBC Sport
9 December	Ibrox Stadium, Glasgow (H)	(Greece) Panathinaikos	1–3	Michael Mols	BBC Sport

=== Celtic ===
Date	Venue	Opponents	Score	Celtic scorer(s)	Report
Champions League Second qualifying round
30 July	S.Dariaus ir S.Girėno Stadium, Kaunas (A)	(Lithuania) FBK Kaunas	4–0	Henrik Larsson, Chris Sutton, Shaun Maloney, Liam Miller	BBC Sport
6 August	Celtic Park, Glasgow (H)	(Lithuania) FBK Kaunas	1–0	Darius Gvildys (o.g.)	BBC Sport
Champions League Third qualifying round
13 August	Hidegkuti Nándor, Budapest (A)	(Hungary) MTK Hungária FC	4–0	Henrik Larsson, Didier Agathe, Stilian Petrov, Chris Sutton	BBC Sport
27 August	Celtic Park, Glasgow (H)	(Hungary) MTK Hungária FC	1–0	Chris Sutton	BBC Sport
Champions League Group stage
17 September	Olympic Stadium, Munich (A)	(Germany) Bayern Munich	1–2	Alan Thompson	BBC Sport
30 September	Celtic Park, Glasgow (H)	(France) Lyon	2–0	Liam Miller, Chris Sutton	BBC Sport
21 October	Constant Vanden Stock Stadium, Anderlecht (A)	(Belgium) Anderlecht	0–1		BBC Sport
5 November	Celtic Park, Glasgow (H)	(Belgium) Anderlecht	3–1	Henrik Larsson, Liam Miller, Chris Sutton	BBC Sport
25 November	Celtic Park, Glasgow (H)	(Germany) Bayern Munich	0–0		BBC Sport
10 December	Stade de Gerland, Lyon (A)	(France) Lyon	2–3	John Hartson, Chris Sutton	BBC Sport
UEFA Cup Third round
26 February	Celtic Park, Glasgow (H)	(Czech Republic) FK Teplice	3–0	Henrik Larsson (2), Chris Sutton	BBC Sport
3 March	Na Stínadlech, Teplice (A)	(Czech Republic) FK Teplice	0–1		BBC Sport
UEFA Cup Fourth round
10 March	Celtic Park, Glasgow (H)	(Spain) FC Barcelona	1–0	Alan Thompson	BBC Sport
24 March	Nou Camp, Barcelona (A)	(Spain) FC Barcelona	0–0		BBC Sport
UEFA Cup Quarter-final
8 April	Celtic Park, Glasgow (H)	(Spain) Villarreal	1–1	Henrik Larsson	BBC Sport
14 April	Estadio El Madrigal, Villarreal (A)	(Spain) Villarreal	0–2		BBC Sport

=== Hearts ===
Date	Venue	Opponents	Score	Hearts scorer(s)	Report
UEFA Cup First round
24 September	Tynecastle Stadium, Edinburgh (H)	(Bosnia and Herzegovina) NK Željezničar	2–0	Mark de Vries, Andrew Webster	BBC Sport
15 October	Grbavica Stadium, Sarajevo (A)	(Bosnia and Herzegovina) NK Željezničar	0–0		BBC Sport
UEFA Cup Second round
6 November	Stade Chaban Delmas, Bordeaux (A)	(France) Girondins de Bordeaux	1–0	Mark de Vries	BBC Sport
6 November	Tynecastle Stadium, Edinburgh (H)	(France) Girondins de Bordeaux	0–2		BBC Sport

=== Dundee ===
Date	Venue	Opponents	Score	Dundee scorer(s)	Report
UEFA Cup Qualifying round
14 August	Loro Borici stadium, Albania (A)	(Albania) Vllaznia	2–0	Steve Lovell, Nacho Novo	BBC Sport
28 August	Dens Park, Dundee (H)	(Albania) Vllaznia	4–0	Nacho Novo (2), Juan Sara, Gavin Rae	BBC Sport
UEFA Cup First round
24 September	Dens Park, Dundee (H)	(Italy) Perugia	1–2	Lee Wilkie	BBC Sport
15 October	Stadio Renato Curi, Perugia (A)	(Italy) Perugia	0–1		BBC Sport

== Scotland national team ==
Date	Venue	Opponents	Score	Competition	Scotland scorer(s)	Report
20 August	Ullevaal Stadium, Oslo (A)	Norway	0–0	Friendly		BBC Sport
6 September	Hampden Park, Glasgow (H)	Faroe Islands	3–1	ECQG5	Neil McCann, Paul Dickov, James McFadden	BBC Sport
10 September	Westfalenstadion, Dortmund (A)	Germany	1–2	ECQG5	Neil McCann	BBC Sport
11 October	Hampden Park, Glasgow (H)	Lithuania	1–0	ECQG5	Darren Fletcher	BBC Sport
15 November	Hampden Park, Glasgow (H)	Netherlands	1–0	ECQPO	James McFadden	BBC Sport
19 November	Amsterdam ArenA, Amsterdam (A)	Netherlands	0–6	ECQPO		BBC Sport
18 February	Millennium Stadium, Cardiff (A)	Wales	0–4	Friendly		BBC Sport
31 March	Hampden Park, Glasgow (H)	Romania	1–2	Friendly	James McFadden	BBC Sport
28 April	Parken Stadium, Copenhagen (A)	Denmark	0–1	Friendly		BBC Sport
27 May	A. Le Coq Arena, Tallinn (A)	Estonia	1–0	Friendly	James McFadden	BBC Sport
30 May	Easter Road, Edinburgh (H)	Trinidad and Tobago	4–1	Friendly	Darren Fletcher, Gary Holt, Gary Caldwell, Nigel Quashie	BBC Sport

Key:

- (A) = Away match
- (H) = Home match
- ECQG5 = European Championship Qualifying – Group 5
- EFQPO = European Championship Qualifying – Play-off

== Deaths ==
- 1 February: Ally MacLeod, 72, Scotland national team manager (1977–78).
- 12 February: Leonard Dudman, 70, Falkirk and Forfar Athletic winger.

== See also ==
- 2003–04 Celtic F.C. season
- 2003–04 Dundee United F.C. season
- 2003–04 Rangers F.C. season
