= Mark Brown (footballer, born 1981) =

Scottish footballer

Personal information
- Date of birth: 28 February 1981 (age 45)
- Place of birth: Motherwell, Scotland
- Position: Goalkeeper

Youth career
- 1997–1999: Rangers

Senior career*
Years	Team	Apps	(Gls)
1999–2001	Rangers	4	(0)
2001–2002	Motherwell	19	(0)
2002–2007	Inverness Caledonian Thistle	170	(0)
2007–2010	Celtic	13	(0)
2009–2010	→ Kilmarnock (loan)	14	(0)
2010–2012	Hibernian	33	(0)
2012–2015	Ross County	63	(0)
2015–2017	Dumbarton	22	(0)
Total		338	(0)

International career
2005–2006	Scotland B	2	(0)
- * Club domestic league appearances and goals

Mark Brown (born 28 February 1981) is a Scottish former professional footballer, who played as a goalkeeper.

Brown played for both Old Firm clubs, Rangers and Celtic, and also played for Motherwell, Inverness Caledonian Thistle, Kilmarnock, Hibernian, Ross County and Dumbarton. Brown represented Scotland B twice, during his time with Inverness.

== Club career ==
=== Early career ===
Brown, a goalkeeper, started his career with Rangers, where he made just five first team appearances as a young player, before moving on to Motherwell. Brown made 19 appearances with Motherwell before the club's financial difficulties forced them into administration; Brown was one of 19 players released by the club to lessen its wage bill.

=== Inverness CT ===
Brown earned a contract with Inverness Caledonian Thistle in the summer of 2002 after impressing then-manager Steve Paterson, and quickly became an indispensable member of the first team squad. Brown also played international football for Scotland B.

After joining Inverness, Brown's reputation as a talented goalkeeper grew, helped by his performances for the club in the Scottish First Division, the Scottish Cup and the SPL. The highlights of his career include a Scottish Cup Player of the Round award in March 2003, after his performance in goal helped Inverness to a 1–0 quarter-final win against Celtic.

=== Celtic ===
With Brown's contract due to expire in the summer of 2007, Inverness Caledonian Thistle accepted an undisclosed "six figure" transfer fee from Celtic for the goalkeeper's services in January, rather than risk him leaving on a free transfer at the end of the season. The player joins the list of players to have crossed the Old Firm divide and play for both teams. Brown largely served Celtic as a back-up to Artur Boruc, making only 13 league appearances for the club. The signings of Dominic Cervi and Łukasz Załuska pushed Brown down Celtic's selection order.

Hibernian expressed interest in signing Brown during the summer of 2009, but Celtic rejected this approach as they wanted a transfer fee for his services. Brown was then loaned instead to fellow SPL side Kilmarnock in September 2009, until January 2010. Kilmarnock required cover for the injured Alan Combe; Brown played in 14 league matches for the Ayrshire side.

=== Hibernian ===
Celtic released Brown in January 2010, which allowed him to sign for Hibernian. Brown competed with Graeme Smith and Graham Stack for the Hibernian goalkeeping position, an area which manager John Hughes said had caused him "concern". Brown did not play for Hibs during the rest of the 2009–10 season, partly due to injury. He had to wait until a 3–0 defeat by Rangers on 22 August to make his debut for Hibs, 204 days after he signed for the club.

Brown kept his place in the Hibs team until January 2011, when new manager Colin Calderwood decided to give opportunities to his other goalkeepers under a rotation policy. Brown played less often during the 2011–12 season, featuring only in Scottish League Cup ties during the early part of the season. He played in four games during January after Stack was injured, but he was dropped after a 4–0 defeat against Rangers. Stack was then injured during the Scottish Cup semi-final victory against Aberdeen, allowing Brown to play for the rest of the season.

Despite a poor performance in the 2012 Scottish Cup Final defeat by Hearts, his agent Kevin Drinkell said that Hibs wanted to agree a new contract with Brown. Later in the close season, however, Hibs signed Ben Williams as first choice goalkeeper and gave a new contract to Calum Antell. Brown then went on trial with Southend United.

=== Ross County ===
Brown signed for Ross County in August 2012 and made his debut the same month in a Scottish League Cup 4–1 defeat to Raith Rovers. He signed a new contract with Ross County in June 2013. After playing 30 times during the 2013–14 season, Brown signed a new one-year contract on 19 May 2014, the new deal also including taking up the position of the club's goalkeeping coach. At the end of the 2014–15 season, Brown was released by Ross County.

=== Dumbarton ===
In June 2015, after leaving Ross County the previous month, Brown signed a two-year deal with Scottish Championship side Dumbarton. He left the club and retired from the game in March 2017 after making 32 appearances over almost two seasons, to take up a role with the Police.

== Career statistics ==
As of 7 January 2017

Club	Season	League		National Cup		League Cup		Europe		Other (Note: Includes other competitive competitions, including the Scottish Challenge Cup.)		Total	
Club	Season	Apps	Goals	Apps	Goals	Apps	Goals	Apps	Goals	Apps	Goals	Apps	Goals
Rangers	1999–2000	1	0	0	0	1	0	0	0	0	0	2	0
Rangers	2000–01	3	0	0	0	0	0	0	0	0	0	3	0
Rangers	Total	4	0	0	0	1	0	0	0	0	0	5	0
Motherwell	2001–02	19	0	0	0	1	0	0	0	0	0	20	0
Inverness	2002–03	36	0	4	0	3	0	0	0	1	0	44	0
Inverness	2003–04	36	0	5	0	1	0	0	0	5	0	47	0
Inverness	2004–05	38	0	2	0	2	0	0	0	0	0	42	0
Inverness	2005–06	37	0	4	0	3	0	0	0	0	0	44	0
Inverness	2006–07	23	0	1	0	2	0	0	0	0	0	26	0
Inverness	Total	170	0	16	0	11	0	0	0	6	0	203	0
Celtic	2006–07	1	0	0	0	0	0	0	0	0	0	1	0
Celtic	2007–08	8	0	0	0	0	0	1	0	0	0	9	0
Celtic	2008–09	4	0	0	0	0	0	0	0	0	0	4	0
Celtic	Total	13	0	0	0	0	0	1	0	0	0	14	0
Kilmarnock (loan)	2009–10	14	0	0	0	1	0	0	0	0	0	15	0
Hibernian	2010–11	26	0	1	0	1	0	0	0	0	0	28	0
Hibernian	2011–12	7	0	3	0	3	0	0	0	0	0	13	0
Hibernian	Total	33	0	4	0	4	0	0	0	0	0	41	0
Ross County	2012–13	13	0	2	0	1	0	0	0	0	0	16	0
Ross County	2013–14	28	0	1	0	1	0	0	0	0	0	30	0
Ross County	2014–15	22	0	1	0	2	0	0	0	0	0	25	0
Ross County	Total	63	0	4	0	4	0	0	0	0	0	71	0
Dumbarton	2015–16	21	0	3	0	1	0	0	0	2	0	27	0
Dumbarton	2016–17	1	0	0	0	4	0	0	0	0	0	5	0
Dumbarton	Total	22	0	3	0	5	0	0	0	2	0	32	0
Career total		338	0	27	0	27	0	1	0	8	0	401	0

== International career ==
Brown's impressive form for Inverness Caledonian Thistle earned him a call-up to the Scotland "B" squad, where he played part of the second half in a friendly against Austria in April 2005 and the first half against Turkey in March 2006.

== Honours ==
Inverness CT

- Scottish First Division: 2003–04
- Scottish Challenge Cup: 2003–04

Celtic

- Scottish Premier League (2): 2006–07, 2007–08
- Scottish League Cup (1): 2008–09

== See also ==
- Played for Celtic and Rangers
