= 2002–03 Inverness Caledonian Thistle F.C. season =

Scottish football club season

Inverness Caledonian Thistle F.C.
2002–03 season
- Manager: Steve Paterson (to December); John Robertson (from December)
- Scottish First Division: 4th
- Scottish Cup: Semi-final
- Scottish League Cup: 3rd Round
- Scottish Challenge Cup: 1st Round
- Top goalscorer: League: Dennis Wyness (19); All: Dennis Wyness (27)
- Highest home attendance: 6,050 vs. Celtic, 23 March 2003
- Lowest home attendance: 667 vs. Dumbarton, 10 September 2002

Inverness Caledonian Thistle F.C. in their ninth season in the Scottish Football League competed in the Scottish First Division, Scottish League Cup, Scottish Challenge Cup and the Scottish Cup in season 2002–03.

== Results ==
=== Scottish First Division ===
Match Day	Date	Opponent	H/A	Score	ICT Scorer(s)	Attendance
1	3 August	Alloa Athletic	H	0-0		1,623
2	10 August	St Johnstone	A	0–1		3,772
3	17 August	Falkirk	H	1–2	Tokely	2,267
4	24 August	Ross County	H	2–0	Wyness (2)	3,699
5	31 August	St Mirren	A	4–0	Robson (2), Hart, Christie	2,605
6	14 September	Queen of the South	A	3–1	Wyness (2), Mann	1,611
7	21 September	Arbroath	H	5–0	Tokely (2), Hart, Wyness, Ritchie	1,685
8	28 September	Clyde	A	0–3		936
9	5 October	Ayr United	H	2–0	Ritchie, Wyness	1,803
10	19 October	Alloa Athletic	A	6–0	Wyness (3), Ritchie (3)	531
11	26 October	St Johnstone	H	2–1	Wyness, Hart	2,541
12	2 November	St Mirren	H	4–1	Wyness (2), Hart, Robson	2,023
13	9 November	Ross County	A	2–0	Robson, McCulloch (own goal)	5,449
14	16 November	Queen of the South	H	5–3	Ritchie (3), Robson (2)	1,855
15	23 November	Arbroath	A	2–1	Wyness, Hart	653
16	30 November	Clyde	H	1–0	Robson	2,829
17	7 December	Ayr United	A	3–3	Mann, Ritchie, Wyness	1,663
18	14 December	Falkirk	A	1-1	MacKenzie (own goal)	4,691
19	21 December	Alloa Athletic	H	1-1	Mann	1,639
20	28 December	St Mirren	A	4–1	Wyness, Tokely, Stewart, Ritchie	3,054
21	18 January	Ayr United	H	0–1		2,021
22	8 February	Falkirk	H	3–4	Robson, Wyness, Ritchie	3,322
23	15 February	St Johnstone	A	0–2		2,613
24	25 February	Ross County	H	1–5	Wyness	3,443
25	1 March	St Mirren	H	3–1	Ritchie (3)	1,973
26	4 March	Arbroath	H	2-0	Hart, Low	1,396
27	8 March	Ross County	A	2–0	Hart, Robson	4,621
28	11 March	Queen of the South	A	0–0		1,405
29	15 March	Arbroath	A	3–1	Wyness (2), Hislop	539
30	18 March	Clyde	A	1–4	Robson	703
31	5 April	Queen of the South	H	1–0	Tokely	1,656
32	12 April	Clyde	H	1–2	Hislop	1,682
33	26 April	Alloa Athletic	A	5–1	Ritchie (3), Mann, Golabek	485
34	29 April	Ayr United	A	0–1		1,114
35	3 May	St Johnstone	H	1–2	Hart	1,814
36	10 May	Falkirk	A	3-2	Nicholls (own goal), Mann, Christie	7,300

==== Final League table ====
Pos	Team	Pld	W	D	L	GF	GA	GD	Pts
2	Clyde	36	21	9	6	66	37	+29	72
3	St Johnstone	36	20	7	9	49	29	+20	67
4	Inverness CT	36	20	5	11	74	45	+29	65
5	Queen of the South	36	12	12	12	45	48	−3	48
6	Ayr United	36	12	9	15	34	44	−10	45

Source: "2002-2003 First Division - SPFL Archive". SPFL.
Rules for classification: 1) points; 2) goal difference; 3) number of goals scored.

=== Scottish League Cup ===
Round	Date	Opponent	H/A	Score	ICT Scorer(s)	Attendance
R1	10 September	Dumbarton	H	2–0	Wyness, Ritchie	667
R2	24 September	St Mirren	H	3–1	Wyness (2), Hart	1,194
R3	23 October	Celtic	A	2-4	Ritchie, Wyness	32,122

=== Scottish Challenge Cup ===
Round	Date	Opponent	H/A	Score	ICT Scorer(s)	Attendance
R1	6 August	Berwick Rangers	A	0–1		338

=== Scottish Cup ===
Round	Date	Opponent	H/A	Score	ICT Scorer(s)	Attendance
R3	25 January	Raith Rovers	H	2–0	Robson, Wyness	2,146
R4	22 February	Hamilton Academical	H	6–1	Wyness (2), Robson (2), Ritchie, McCaffrey	1,917
QF	23 March	Celtic	H	1–0	Wyness	6,050
SF	20 April	Dundee	N	0–1		14,429

== Hat-tricks ==
Player	Competition	Score	Opponent	Date
(Scotland) Dennis Wyness	Scottish First Division	0–6	Alloa Athletic	19 October 2002
(Scotland) Paul Ritchie	Scottish First Division	0–6	Alloa Athletic	19 October 2002
(Scotland) Paul Ritchie	Scottish First Division	5–3	Queen of the South	16 November 2002
(Scotland) Paul Ritchie	Scottish First Division	3–1	St Mirren	1 March 2003
(Scotland) Paul Ritchie	Scottish First Division	1–5	Alloa Athletic	26 April 2003
