= David Bingham (Scottish footballer) =

Scottish footballer and coach

Personal information
- Full name: David Thomas Bingham
- Date of birth: 3 September 1970 (age 56)
- Place of birth: Dunfermline, Scotland
- Position: Forward

Youth career
- Oakley United

Senior career*
| Years | Team | Apps | (Gls) |
| 1989–1992 | St Johnstone | 17 | (3) |
| 1992–1995 | Forfar Athletic | 99 | (44) |
| 1995–1998 | Dunfermline Athletic | 62 | (9) |
| 1998–2003 | Livingston | 164 | (50) |
| 2003–2004 | Inverness Caledonian Thistle | 33 | (13) |
| 2004–2008 | Gretna | 57 | (28) |
| 2007 | → Stirling Albion (loan) | 9 | (0) |
| 2007 | → Queen of the South (loan) | 15 | (0) |
| 2008 | → Cowdenbeath (loan) | 8 | (0) |
| Total | | 464 | (147) |

Managerial career
- 2008–2011: Tynecastle
- 2011–2014: Preston Athletic
- 2016–2017: Whitehill Welfare
- * Club domestic league appearances and goals

David Thomas Bingham (born 3 September 1970) is a Scottish football coach and former footballer.

== Career ==
=== Youth career ===
David played for under-12s Oakley United B.C.(Fife), under-13–14 Salveson B.C.(Edinburgh), under-15–16 Crossford B.C. (Fife) and under-18–21 Inverkeithing B.C. (Fife).

=== Playing ===
Bingham began his career at St Johnstone in 1991 before moving to Scottish Second Division side Forfar Athletic in 1992. He played in just under 100 matches for the club, helping the side to win the Scottish Third Division in 1995. His performances attracted the attention of Dunfermline Athletic, and he was soon signed by then manager Bert Paton for £100,000. After 3 years with the Pars, Bingham moved to up-and-coming side Livingston in 1998. He scored 50 goals in 148 first team appearances for the Livi Lions, enjoying a great 2001–02 season, when he scored a bagful of goals in their first season in the Scottish Premier League. In 2003, he moved to Inverness Caledonian Thistle, where he won the First Division title in his first season at the club. Instead of staying in the Scottish Premier League with Caley Thistle, he decided to drop down to the Third Division with Gretna, scoring 30 goals in 54 league games helping his side to race up the divisions in consecutive seasons. Bingham then joined Queen of the South on a six-month loan deal in July 2007, and returned to Gretna in December 2007, before being loaned out to Cowdenbeath in January 2008. Due to Gretna's financial difficulties towards the end of the 2007–08 season, Bingham was released from his contract along with all other staff members at the club.

=== Coaching ===
Bingham unsuccessfully applied to be manager with Berwick Rangers and Forfar Athletic in 2008, and became coach of the Dunfermline Athletic under-14 side. In August 2008, he became player-coach at East of Scotland League First Division side Tynecastle. In 2011, he became the manager of Preston Athletic. Bingham helped save coach Stevie Adamson's life when he collapsed with a heart attack after training in December 2014. He resigned from this position in September 2014.

On 31 March 2016, Bingham became assistant manager of Lowland League club Whitehill Welfare. After Steve Hislop resigned from his post, Bingham was appointed manager on 18 November 2016. He was fired by Whitehill at the end of the 2016/17 season.

== Honours ==
Forfar Athletic

- Scottish Third Division: 1994–95

Dunfermline Athletic

- Scottish First Division: 1995–96

Livingston

- Scottish First Division: 2000–01

Inverness CT

- Scottish First Division: 2003–04
- Scottish Challenge Cup: 2003–04

Gretna

- Scottish Third Division: 2004–05

Individual

- SFL Player of the Year: 2000–01
- SPFA 1st Division Player of the Year: 2000–01
- SPFA 2nd Division Player of the Year: 1998–99
- SPFA 3rd Division Player of the Year: 1994–95, 2004–05
