= 2003–04 Scottish Challenge Cup =

2003–04 Challenge Cup
Tournament details
- Country: Scotland
- Teams: 30

Final positions
- Champions: Inverness Caledonian Thistle
- Runners-up: Airdrie United

Tournament statistics
- Matches played: 29
- Goals scored: 99 (3.41 per match)

The 2003–04 Scottish Challenge Cup was the 13th season of the competition, competed for by all 30 members of the Scottish Football League. The defending champions were Queen of the South, who defeated Brechin City 2–0 in the 2002 final. Queen of the South were eliminated in the first round after 2–1 defeat against Stranraer.

The final was played on 26 October 2003, between Inverness Caledonian Thistle and Airdrie United at McDiarmid Park, Perth. Inverness Caledonian Thistle won 2–0, to claim their first 'major' cup.

== Schedule ==
Round	First match date	Fixtures	Clubs
First round	Saturday 2 August 2003	14	30 → 16
Second round	Tuesday 12 August 2003	8	16 → 8
Quarter-finals	Tuesday 26 August 2003	4	8 → 4
Semi-finals	Tue/Wed 16/17 September 2003	2	4 → 2
Final	Sunday 26 October 2003	1	2 → 1

== First round ==
Berwick Rangers and Dumbarton received random byes into the second round.

2 August 2003	Airdrie United	2–0	Montrose	New Broomfield, Airdrie
15:00		Report		Attendance: 1,151

2 August 2003	Albion Rovers	1–0	East Fife	Cliftonhill, Coatbridge
15:00		Report		Attendance: 219

2 August 2003	Alloa Athletic	1–2	Clyde	Recreation Park, Alloa
15:00		Report		Attendance: 633

2 August 2003	Ayr United	1 – 2 (a.e.t.)	Stirling Albion	Somerset Park, Ayr
15:00		Report		Attendance: 1,115

2 August 2003	Brechin City	1–0	Falkirk	Glebe Park, Brechin
15:00		Report		Attendance: 938

2 August 2003	Cowdenbeath	1–2	Ross County	Central Park, Cowdenbeath
15:00		Report		Attendance: 325

2 August 2003	East Stirlingshire	2–5	Raith Rovers	Firs Park, Falkirk
15:00		Report		Attendance: 556

2 August 2003	Forfar Athletic	4–0	Elgin City	Station Park, Forfar
15:00		Report		Attendance: 444

2 August 2003	Gretna	0–5	Inverness Caledonian Thistle	Raydale Park, Gretna
15:00		Report		Attendance: 528

2 August 2003	Hamilton Academical	2 – 3 (a.e.t.)	St Johnstone	New Douglas Park Hamilton
15:00		Report		Attendance: 1,097

2 August 2003	Greenock Morton	4–3	Arbroath	Cappielow, Greenock
15:00		Report		Attendance: 2,227

2 August 2003	St Mirren	3 – 2 (a.e.t.)	Queen's Park	St Mirren Park, Paisley
15:00		Report		Attendance: 1,800

2 August 2003	Stenhousemuir	0–3	Peterhead	Ochilview Park, Stenhousemuir
15:00		Report		Attendance: 423

2 August 2003	Stranraer	2–1	Queen of the South	Stair Park, Stranraer
15:00		Report		Attendance: 875

Source: ESPN Soccernet

== Second round ==
12 August 2003	Brechin City	3–1	Stirling Albion	Glebe Park, Brechin
19:30		Report		Attendance: 246

12 August 2003	Clyde	0–1	St Johnstone	Broadwood Stadium, Cumbernauld
19:30		Report		Attendance: 1,521

12 August 2003	Forfar Athletic	4 – 2 (a.e.t.)	Albion Rovers	Station Park, Forfar
19:30		Report		Attendance: 423

12 August 2003	Greenock Morton	1–2	Airdrie United	Cappielow, Greenock
19:30		Report		Attendance: 3,317

12 August 2003	Ross County	5–0	Dumbarton	Victoria Park, Dingwall
19:30		Report		Attendance: 861

12 August 2003	Peterhead	1–2	Inverness Caledonian Thistle	Balmoor, Peterhead
19:45		Report		Attendance: 886

12 August 2003	Raith Rovers	2–0	Stranraer	Stark's Park, Kirkcaldy
19:45		Report		Attendance: 1,396

12 August 2003	St Mirren	2–1	Berwick Rangers	St Mirren Park, Paisley
19:45		Report		Attendance: 1,547

Source: ESPN Soccernet

== Quarter-finals ==
26 August 2003
19:30

Inverness Caledonian Thistle	1–0	Ross County
Hislop 49'	Report

Caledonian Stadium, Inverness
Attendance: 2,631
Referee: W Young

26 August 2003
19:45

Forfar Athletic	0–2	Airdrie United
Byers (red card) 85'	Report	Wilson 55'; Dunn 74'

Station Park, Forfar
Attendance: 752
Referee: J Rowbotham

26 August 2003
19:45

Raith Rovers	3–2	St Mirren
Prest 27', 62'; Ellis 33' (o.g.)	Report	Russell 40'; O'Neill 74'

Stark's Park, Kirkcaldy
Attendance: 1,949
Referee: D McDonald

26 August 2003
19:45

St Johnstone	1–2	Brechin City
Forsyth 90'	Report	Jablonski 3'; Fotheringham 34' (pen.)

McDiarmid Park, Perth
Attendance: 1,919
Referee: K Clarke

== Semi-finals ==
16 September 2003
19:45

Raith Rovers	0–4	Inverness Caledonian Thistle
	Report	Wilson 28', 81'; Ritchie 30', 43'

Stark's Park, Kirkcaldy
Attendance: 2,110
Referee: K Clark

17 September 2003
19:45

Brechin City	1 – 2 (a.e.t.)	Airdrie United
White 15'	Report	Dunn 35'; Gow 112'; Vareille (red card) 45'

Glebe Park, Brechin
Attendance: 803
Referee: D McDonald

== Final ==
26 October 2003
15:00

Inverness Caledonian Thistle	2–0	Airdrie United
Bingham 79'; Hislop 89'	Report

McDiarmid Park, Perth
Attendance: 5,428
Referee: W Young
