= 2014–15 St Johnstone F.C. season =

St Johnstone
2014–15 season
- Chairman: Steve Brown
- Manager: Tommy Wright
- Stadium: McDiarmid Park
- Premiership: 4th
- Scottish Cup: Fifth round lost to Queen of the South
- League Cup: Quarter-finals lost to Rangers
- Europa League: Third qualifying round lost to Spartak Trnava
- Top goalscorer: League: Brian Graham; Michael O'Halloran (9 each); All: Brian Graham; Michael O'Halloran (10 each)
- Highest home attendance: 8,486 vs FC Luzern; UEFA Europa League; 24 July 2014
- Lowest home attendance: 2,383 vs Ross County; Scottish Cup; 29 November 2014
Home colours	Away colours

The 2014–15 season was St Johnstone's sixth-consecutive season in the top flight of Scottish football and their second in the newly established Scottish Premiership. St Johnstone also competed in the League Cup, the Scottish Cup and the Europa League. They also went into the season the holders of the Scottish Cup, having won it for the first time in their history the previous year.

== Summary ==
St Johnstone kept manager Tommy Wright for the season with Callum Davidson assistant. They went into the 2014–15 Season as Scottish Cup holders after winning it for the first time in their history the previous year. However, they were unable to retain the trophy after losing to Queen of the South in the Fifth Round.

== Results and fixtures ==
Win Draw Loss Postponed

=== Pre-season/friendlies ===
9 July 2014 Friendly	East Fife	0–4	St Johnstone	Bayview Stadium, Levenmouth, Methil
		saints	O'Halloran; May; MacLean; Kane

12 July 2014 Friendly	Raith Rovers	1–1	St Johnstone	Stark's Park, Kirkcaldy
	Nadé	saints	Wotherspoon	Attendance: 1,103

19 July 2014 Friendly	St Johnstone	0–0	York City (England)	McDiarmid Park, Perth
		saints		Attendance: 994

3 August 2014 Steven Anderson Testimonial	St Johnstone	0–4	Heart of Midlothian	McDiarmid Park, Perth
15:00		saints Hearts Report	Sow 31'; Holt 33'; Oliver 54', 67'	Attendance: 2,182; Referee: Don Robertson

=== Scottish Premiership ===
10 August 2014 1	Ross County	1–2	St Johnstone	Victoria Park, Dingwall
15:00	Jervis 55'	BBC saints	O'Halloran 31'; MacLean 48'	Attendance: 3,287; Referee: Kevin Clancy

13 August 2014 2	St Johnstone	0–3	Celtic	McDiarmid Park, Perth
19:45		BBC saints	Stokes 55'; Bitton 76' (pen.); McGregor 83'	Attendance: 6,890; Referee: John Beaton

16 August 2014 3	Hamilton Academical	1–0	St Johnstone	New Douglas Park, Hamilton
15:00	MacKinnon 16'	BBC saints		Attendance: 1,577; Referee: Bobby Madden

23 August 2014 4	St Johnstone	1–0	Aberdeen	McDiarmid Park, Perth
15:00	MacLean 80'	BBC saints		Attendance: 6,377; Referee: Craig Thomson

30 August 2014 5	Motherwell	0–1	St Johnstone	Fir Park, Motherwell
15:00		BBC saints	Graham 86'	Attendance: 3,700; Referee: Alan Muir

13 September 2014 6	St Johnstone	0–1	Dundee	McDiarmid Park, Perth
15:00		BBC saints	Harkins 28'	Attendance: 6,562; Referee: Willie Collum

20 September 2014 7	Inverness Caledonian Thistle	2–1	St Johnstone	Caledonian Stadium, Inverness
15:00	Watkins 61'; Christie 66'	BBC saints	Graham 78'	Attendance: 2,770; Referee: Calum Murray

27 September 2014 8	Dundee United	2–0	St Johnstone	Tannadice Park, Dundee
15:00	Erskine 23'; Paton 72'	BBC saints		Attendance: 7,161; Referee: Bobby Madden

4 October 2014 9	St Johnstone	1–2	St Mirren	McDiarmid Park, Perth
15:00	Anderson 68'	BBC saints	Naismith 28'; Drury 87'	Attendance: 3,400; Referee: Don Robertson

18 October 2014 10	St Johnstone	1–2	Kilmarnock	McDiarmid Park, Perth
15:00	Murray Davidson 10'	BBC saints	Magennis 19', 22'	Attendance: 3,115; Referee: Craig Thomson

25 October 2014 11	Partick Thistle	0–0	St Johnstone	Firhill Stadium, Glasgow
15:00		BBC saints		Attendance: 3,090; Referee: Calum Murray

31 October 2014 12	St Johnstone	2–1	Motherwell	McDiarmid Park, Perth
19:45	O'Halloran 40', 80'	BBC saints	Ainsworth 13'	Attendance: 2,531; Referee: Kevin Clancy

8 November 2014 13	Dundee	1–1	St Johnstone	Dens Park, Dundee
15:00	Clarkson 41'	BBC saints	Graham 53' (pen.)	Attendance: 6,931; Referee: Bobby Madden

22 November 2014 14	St Johnstone	2–1	Ross County	McDiarmid Park, Perth
15:00	McFadden 39'; O'Halloran 73'	BBC saints	Jervis 75'	Attendance: 2,776; Referee: Steven McLean

6 December 2014 15	St Mirren	0–1	St Johnstone	St Mirren Park, Paisley
15:00		BBC saints	O'Halloran 8'	Attendance: 2,720; Referee: Kevin Clancy

13 December 2014 16	Kilmarnock	0–1	St Johnstone	Rugby Park, Kilmarnock
15:00		BBC saints	Graham 82' (pen.)	Attendance: 3,220; Referee: Don Robertson

20 December 2014 17	St Johnstone	1–0	Inverness Caledonian Thistle	McDiarmid Park, Perth
15:00	Graham 62' (pen.)	BBC saints	Draper (red card) 67'	Attendance: 2,891; Referee: Brian Colvin

27 December 2014 18	St Johnstone	2–1	Dundee United	McDiarmid Park, Perth
15:00	O'Halloran 76'; Millar 86'	BBC saints	Butcher 43'	Attendance: 7,384; Referee: Alan Muir

1 January 2015 19	Aberdeen	2–0	St Johnstone	Pittodrie Stadium, Aberdeen
15:00	Goodwillie 6'; Smith 93'	BBC saints		Attendance: 15,263; Referee: Craig Thomson

4 January 2015 20	St Johnstone	0–1	Hamilton Academical	McDiarmid Park, Perth
15:00	McFadden (yellow card) 41' (yellow-red card) 84'	BBC saints	Andreu 34'	Attendance: 3,202; Referee: Andrew Dallas

17 January 2015 21	St Johnstone	2–0	Partick Thistle	McDiarmid Park, Perth
15:00	Mackay 4'; Anderson 49'	BBC saints		Attendance: 2,994; Referee: Greg Aitken

20 January 2015 22	Inverness Caledonian Thistle	2–0	St Johnstone	Caledonian Stadium, Inverness
19:45	Billy McKay 34'; Marley Watkins 41'	BBC saints		Attendance: 3,161; Referee: Kevin Clancy

23 January 2015 23	St Johnstone	1–1	Aberdeen	McDiarmid Park, Perth
19:45	Lappin 30'	BBC saints	Rooney 57'	Attendance: 4,845; Referee: Bobby Madden

31 January 2015 24	Motherwell	1–1	St Johnstone	Fir Park, Motherwell
15:00	Laing (red card) 25'; Sutton 75'	BBC saints	Davidson 8'	Attendance: 3,449; Referee: Willie Collum

14 February 2015 25	St Johnstone	1–2	Celtic	McDiarmid Park, Perth
	O'Halloran 72'	BBC saints	Griffiths 1'; Johansen 52'	Attendance: 6,727; Referee: Kevin Clancy

21 February 2015 26	Dundee United	0–2	St Johnstone	Tannadice Park, Dundee
15:00		BBC saints	O'Halloran 9', 44'	Attendance: 7,623; Referee: Willie Collum

28 February 2015 27	St Johnstone	0–0	Kilmarnock	McDiarmid Park, Perth
15:00		BBC saints		Attendance: 3,170; Referee: Euan Anderson

4 March 2015 28	Celtic	0–1	St Johnstone	Celtic Park, Glasgow
19:45		BBC saints	Swanson 54'	Attendance: 41,849; Referee: Calum Murray

14 March 2015 29	Partick Thistle	3–0	St Johnstone	Firhill Stadium, Glasgow
15:00	Doolan 3'; Balatoni 9'; Bannigan 65'	BBC		Attendance: 3,196; Referee: Willie Collum

21 March 2015 30	St Johnstone	2–0	St Mirren	McDiarmid Park, Perth
15:00	Graham 33'; Anderson 62'	BBC		Attendance: 3,166; Referee: John Beaton

4 April 2015 31	Hamilton Academical	1–1	St Johnstone	New Douglas Park, Hamilton
15:00	Crawford 7'; Canning (red card) 58'	BBC	Graham 72'	Attendance: 2,032; Referee: Greg Aitken

7 April 2015 32	Ross County	1–0	St Johnstone	Victoria Park, Dingwall
19:45	Boyce 84'	BBC		Attendance: 3,319; Referee: Kevin Clancy

11 April 2015 33	St Johnstone	1–0	Dundee	McDiarmid Park, Perth
15:00	Graham 26'	BBC		Attendance: 6,386; Referee: Steven McLean

25 April 2015 34	Dundee	0–2	St Johnstone	Dens Park, Dundee
15:00	Stewart (yellow card) 40' (yellow-red card) 63'	BBC	Swanson 53'; Davidson 67' (o.g.)	Attendance: 6,530; Referee: Craig Thomson

2 May 2015 35	St Johnstone	1–1	Inverness Caledonian Thistle	McDiarmid Park, Perth
15:00	Graham 82'	BBC	Doran 55'; Raven (yellow card) 45' (yellow-red card) 85'	Attendance: 2,986; Referee: Andrew Dallas

9 May 2015 36	St Johnstone	1–1	Dundee United	McDiarmid Park, Perth
15:00	Davidson 77'	BBC	Rankin 68'	Attendance: 4,862; Referee: Kevin Clancy

15 May 2015 37	St Johnstone	0–0	Celtic	McDiarmid Park, Perth
19:45		BBC		Attendance: 6,984; Referee: Crawford Allan

24 May 2015 38	Aberdeen	1–0	St Johnstone	Pittodrie Stadium, Aberdeen
12:30		BBC	Chris Kane 70'	Attendance: 16,389; Referee: Willie Collum

=== UEFA Europa League ===
==== Qualifying phase ====
17 July 2014 Second qualifying round	Luzern (Switzerland)	1–1	St Johnstone	Lucerne, Switzerland
18:30 BST	Schneuwly 67'	BBC saints	MacLean 47'	Stadium: Swissporarena; Attendance: 8,902; Referee: Benoît Bastien (France)

24 July 2014 Second qualifying round	St Johnstone	1–1 (a.e.t.) (2–2 agg.) (5–4 p)	(Switzerland) Luzern	Perth, Scotland
19:45 BST	May 22' (pen.)	BBC saints	Schneuwly 60'	Stadium: McDiarmid Park; Attendance: 8,486; Referee: Jonathan Lardot (Belgium)
	Penalties
	MacLean (penalty scored); Caddis (penalty scored); Mackay (penalty scored); May (penalty scored); Scobbie (penalty scored)		(penalty scored) Freuler; (penalty missed) Schneuwly; (penalty scored) Thiesson; (penalty scored) Wiss; (penalty scored) Winter

31 July 2014 Third qualifying round	St Johnstone	1–2	(Slovakia) Spartak Trnava	Perth, Scotland
19:45 BST	Mackay 90+3'	BBC saints	Schranz 34', 63'	Stadium: McDiarmid Park; Attendance: 7,001; Referee: Mattias Gestranius (Finland)

7 August 2014 Third qualifying round	Spartak Trnava (Slovakia)	1–1 (3–2 agg.)	St Johnstone	Zlaté Moravce, Slovakia
18:30 BST	Mikovič 82'	BBC saints	May 42'	Stadium: Štadión FC ViOn; Attendance: 3,884; Referee: Javier Estrada Fernández (Spain)

=== Scottish League Cup ===
23 September 2014 Third Round	Kilmarnock	0–1	St Johnstone	Rugby Park, Kilmarnock
19:45	Eremenko (yellow card) 71' (red card)	BBC saints	Graham 78'	Attendance: 2,550; Referee: Steven McLean

28 October 2014 Quarter-Final	Rangers	1–0	St Johnstone	Ibrox Stadium, Glasgow
19:15	Macleod 86'	BBC saints		Attendance: 13,023; Referee: McLean

=== Scottish Cup ===
29 November 2014 Fourth Round	St Johnstone	2–1	Ross County	McDiarmid Park, Perth
15:00	O'Halloran 7'; McFadden 12'	BBC saints	Jervis 63'	Attendance: 2,383; Referee: John Beaton

7 February 2015 Fifth Round	Queen of the South	2–0	St Johnstone	Palmerston Park, Dumfries
15:00	Lyle 48'; Reilly 90'	BBC saints		Attendance: 3,043; Referee: Steven McLean

== Squad statistics ==
During the 2014–15 season, St Johnstone have used twenty three different players in competitive games. The table below shows the number of appearances and goals scored by each player.

=== Appearances ===
Includes all competitive matches. Alan Mannus is the only player to have played every minute of every game in this season

As of match played 24 May 2015

No.	Pos	Nat	Player	Total		Premiership		Europa League		League Cup		Scottish Cup	
No.	Pos	Nat	Player	Apps	Goals	Apps	Goals	Apps	Goals	Apps	Goals	Apps	Goals
1	GK	(Northern Ireland) NIR	Alan Mannus	46	0	38	0	4	0	2	0	2	0
2	DF	(Scotland) SCO	Dave Mackay	42	2	34	1	4	1	2	0	2	0
3	DF	(Scotland) SCO	Tam Scobbie	24	0	17+3	0	1+2	0	0	0	1	0
4	DF	(Scotland) SCO	Simon Lappin	31	1	19+8	1	0	0	2	0	2	0
5	DF	(Scotland) SCO	Frazer Wright	29	0	23+1	0	3	0	1	0	1	0
6	DF	(Scotland) SCO	Steven Anderson	41	3	37	3	0	0	2	0	2	0
7	MF	(Scotland) SCO	Chris Millar	38	1	31	1	4	0	2	0	1	0
9	FW	(Scotland) SCO	Steve MacLean	28	3	23+1	2	4	1	0	0	0	0
10	MF	(Scotland) SCO	David Wotherspoon	42	0	30+5	0	4	0	0+1	0	1+1	0
11	MF	(Scotland) SCO	Danny Swanson	12	2	8+3	2	0	0	0	0	1	0
14	FW	(Scotland) SCO	Brian Graham	27	10	16+7	9	0	0	2	1	1+1	0
16	MF	(Scotland) SCO	Liam Caddis	20	0	5+10	0	2+1	0	0+2	0	0	0
17	FW	(Scotland) SCO	James McFadden	20	2	8+9	1	0	0	0+1	0	2	1
18	MF	(Scotland) SCO	Murray Davidson	27	3	17+6	3	0	0	2	0	1+1	0
19	DF	(Scotland) SCO	Gary Miller	25	0	8+11	0	4	0	1	0	0+1	0
20	MF	(Scotland) SCO	Scott Brown	12	0	7+2	0	3	0	0	0	0	0
22	MF	(England) ENG	Lee Croft	34	0	17+10	0	3+1	0	2	0	1	0
24	DF	(Scotland) SCO	Brian Easton	40	0	31+1	0	4	0	2	0	2	0
25	FW	(Scotland) SCO	Chris Kane	17	1	4+11	1	0+1	0	0	0	1	0
29	FW	(Scotland) SCO	Michael O'Halloran	46	10	29+9	9	3+1	0	2	0	1+1	1
Players who left the club during the 2014–15 season
8	MF	(Scotland) SCO	Gary McDonald	19	0	10+6	0	1+1	0	0+1	0	0	0
11	FW	(England) ENG	Adam Morgan	5	0	1+4	0	0	0	0	0	0	0
17	FW	(Scotland) SCO	Stevie May	2	2	0	0	2	2	0	0	0	0

=== Goal scorers ===
As of 24 May 2015

Ranking	Nation	Number	Name	Scottish Premiership	Europa League	League Cup	Scottish Cup	Total
1	(Scotland)	14	Brian Graham	9	0	1	0	10
1	(Scotland)	29	Michael O'Halloran	9	0	0	1	10
3	(Scotland)	6	Steven Anderson	3	0	0	0	3
3	(Scotland)	9	Steve MacLean	2	1	0	0	3
3	(Scotland)	18	Murray Davidson	3	0	0	0	3
5	(Scotland)	2	Dave Mackay	1	1	0	0	2
5	(Scotland)	11	Danny Swanson	2	0	0	0	2
5	(Scotland)	17	Stevie May	0	2	0	0	2
5	(Scotland)	17	James McFadden	1	0	0	1	2
10	(Scotland)	4	Simon Lappin	1	0	0	0	1
10	(Scotland)	7	Chris Millar	1	0	0	0	1
10	(Scotland)	25	Chris Kane	1	0	0	0	1
			Own goal	1	0	0	0	1
			Totals	34	4	1	2	41

=== Disciplinary record ===
Includes all competitive matches.
Last updated 24 May 2015

Number	Nation	Position	Name	Premiership		Europa League		League Cup		Scottish Cup		Total	
Number	Nation	Position	Name	Booked	Sent off (straight red)	Booked	Sent off (straight red)	Booked	Sent off (straight red)	Booked	Sent off (straight red)	Booked	Sent off (straight red)
2	(Scotland)	DF	Dave Mackay	5	1	1	0	0	0	0	0	6	1
3	(Scotland)	DF	Tam Scobbie	2	0	1	0	0	0	0	0	3	0
4	(Scotland)	DF	Simon Lappin	6	0	0	0	0	0	0	0	6	0
5	(Scotland)	DF	Frazer Wright	1	0	2	0	0	0	1	0	4	0
6	(Scotland)	DF	Steven Anderson	7	0	0	0	1	0	0	0	8	0
7	(Scotland)	MF	Chris Millar	4	0	0	0	0	0	0	0	4	0
8	(Scotland)	MF	Gary McDonald	2	0	0	0	0	0	0	0	2	0
9	(Scotland)	FW	Steve MacLean	6	0	0	0	0	0	0	0	6	0
10	(Scotland)	MF	David Wotherspoon	9	0	2	0	0	0	0	0	11	0
11	(Scotland)	MF	Danny Swanson	4	0	0	0	0	0	0	0	4	0
14	(Scotland)	MF	Brian Graham	4	0	0	0	0	0	0	0	4	0
16	(Scotland)	MF	Liam Caddis	0	0	1	0	0	0	0	0	1	0
17	(Scotland)	FW	James McFadden	3	1	0	0	0	0	1	0	4	1
18	(Scotland)	MF	Murray Davidson	5	0	0	0	1	0	1	0	7	0
19	(Scotland)	DF	Gary Miller	3	0	1	0	0	0	0	0	4	0
22	(England)	MF	Lee Croft	3	0	1	0	0	0	0	0	4	0
24	(Scotland)	DF	Brian Easton	3	0	1	0	1	0	0	0	5	0
25	(Scotland)	FW	Chris Kane	1	0	1	0	0	0	0	0	2	0
29	(Scotland)	FW	Michael O'Halloran	1	0	0	0	1	0	0	0	2	0
			Totals	69	2	11	0	4	0	3	0	87	2

== Team statistics ==
=== League table ===
Pos	Team	Pld	W	D	L	GF	GA	GD	Pts	Qualification or relegation
2	Aberdeen	38	23	6	9	57	33	+24	75	Qualification for the Europa League first qualifying round
3	Inverness Caledonian Thistle	38	19	8	11	52	42	+10	65	Qualification for the Europa League second qualifying round (Note: Inverness Caledonian Thistle qualified for the second qualifying round of the UEFA Europa League by winning the 2014–15 Scottish Cup.)
4	St Johnstone	38	16	9	13	34	34	0	57	Qualification for the Europa League first qualifying round
5	Dundee United	38	17	5	16	58	56	+2	56	
6	Dundee (Note: Teams in the bottom six at the time of the split (33 games) cannot pass teams in the top six)	38	11	12	15	46	57	−11	45	

Source: SPFL
Rules for classification: 1) points; 2) goal difference; 3) number of goals scored

=== Results by opponent ===
St Johnstone score first

Team	Results				Points
Team	1	2	3	4	Points
Aberdeen	1–0	0–2	1–1	1–0	7
Celtic	0–3	1–2	1–0	0–0	4
Dundee	0–1	1–1	1–0	2–0	7
Dundee United	0–2	2–1	2–0	1–1	7
Hamilton Academical	0–1	0–1	1–1	X	1
Inverness C.T.	1–2	1–0	0–2	1–1	4
Kilmarnock	1–2	1–0	0–0	X	4
Motherwell	1–0	2–1	1–1	X	7
Partick Thistle	0–0	2–0	0–3	X	4
Ross County	2–1	2–1	0–1	X	6
St Mirren	1–2	1–0	2–0	X	6

Source: 2014–15 Scottish Premier League Results Table

== Transfers ==
=== Players in ===
Date	Player	From	Fee
8 August 2014	(England) Adam Morgan	(England) Yeovil Town	Loan
21 August 2014	(Scotland) Simon Lappin	(Wales) Cardiff City	Free
28 August 2014	(Scotland) Brian Graham	(Scotland) Dundee United	Loan
1 October 2014	(Scotland) James McFadden	(Scotland) Motherwell	Free
2 February 2015	(Scotland) Danny Swanson	(England) Coventry City	Loan

=== Players out ===
Date	Player	To	Fee
22 May 2014	(Republic of Ireland) Tim Clancy	Released	Free
13 June 2014	(Scotland) Scott Gray	(Scotland) Airdrieonians	Free
30 June 2014	(Scotland) Chris Iwelumo	(England) Chester	Free
25 July 2014	(Scotland) Zander Clark	(England) Queen of the South	Loan
31 July 2014	(Netherlands) Nigel Hasselbaink	(Greece) Veria	Free
9 August 2014	(Scotland) Stevie May	(England) Sheffield Wednesday	£800,000
15 August 2014	(Republic of Ireland) Patrick Cregg	(Republic of Ireland) Shamrock Rovers	Free
29 August 2014	(Scotland) Chris Kane	(Scotland) Dumbarton	Loan
22 January 2015	(Scotland) Dylan Easton	(Scotland) Dumbarton	Loan
12 February 2015	(Scotland) Gary McDonald	(Scotland) Peterhead	Free
