= Pedram Ardalany =

Iranian footballer

Personal information
- Full name: Pedram Ardalany
- Date of birth: 6 August 1989 (age 37)
- Place of birth: Tehran, Iran
- Height: 5 ft 11 in (1.80 m)
- Position: Midfielder

Youth career
- –: Saipa

Senior career*
Years	Team	Apps	(Gls)
2007–2009	Partick Thistle	1	(0)
2009–2011	Arthurlie		
2011–2012	Arbroath	10	(0)
2012–2015	Arthurlie		
2016–2018	Esteghlal Ahvaz	10	(0)
2018–2019	Cumbernauld Colts		
- * Club domestic league appearances and goals as of 12 February 2016

Pedram Ardalany (Persian: پدرام اردلانی; born 6 August 1989) is an Iranian footballer who last played as a midfielder for Cumbernauld Colts.

== Career ==
Ardalany signed a 2-year deal with Partick Thistle F.C. on 2 November 2007, in a contract that will keep him at Firhill Stadium until 31 May 2009.

Ardalany made his début for Partick Thistle on 8 April 2008, coming on as a second-half substitute in a 1–0 win over Stirling Albion.

Ardalany was released by Partick in January 2009. On 10 February 2009, he signed with junior club side Arthurlie F.C. until the end of the season, however he remained in Barrhead until 2011.

After leaving Arthurlie, Ardalany signed a short-term deal with Arbroath, before returning to Arthurlie in February 2012.

Ardalany returned to Scotland in 2018, after a spell with Iranian team Esteghlal Ahvaz.
