= 2004–05 Scottish Third Division =

Scottish Third Division
- Season: 2004–05
- Champions: Gretna
- Promoted: Gretna; Peterhead

The 2004–05 Scottish Third Division was won by Gretna who, along with Peterhead, gained promotion to the Second Division. East Stirlingshire finished bottom.

Location of teams in 2004–05 Scottish Third Division

== Table ==
Pos	Team	Pld	W	D	L	GF	GA	GD	Pts	Promotion
1	Gretna (C, P)	36	32	2	2	130	29	+101	98	Promotion to the Second Division
2	Peterhead (P)	36	23	9	4	81	38	+43	78	Promotion to the Second Division
3	Cowdenbeath	36	14	9	13	54	61	−7	51	
4	Queen's Park	36	13	9	14	51	50	+1	48	
5	Montrose	36	13	7	16	47	53	−6	46	
6	Elgin City	36	12	7	17	39	61	−22	43	
7	Stenhousemuir	36	10	12	14	58	58	0	42	
8	East Fife	36	10	8	18	40	56	−16	38	
9	Albion Rovers	36	8	10	18	40	78	−38	34	
10	East Stirlingshire	36	5	7	24	32	88	−56	22	

Source: "2004-2005 Third Division - SPFL Archive". SPFL.
Rules for classification: 1) points; 2) goal difference; 3) number of goals scored.
(C) Champions; (P) Promoted

== Top scorers ==
Rank	Scorer	Goals	Team
1	(Scotland) Kenny Deuchar	38	Gretna
2	(Scotland) David Bingham	27	Gretna
3	(Scotland) Scott Michie	21	Peterhead
4	(Scotland) Paul McGrillen	18	Stenhousemuir
5	(Scotland) Craig Smart	14	Montrose
5	(Scotland) Frankie Carrol	14	Queen's Park
7	(Scotland) Martin Bavidge	13	Peterhead
8	(England) Gavin Skelton	12	Gretna
8	(Scotland) Darren Gribben	12	Cowdenbeath
10	(Scotland) Joseph Savage	9	Stenhousemuir
10	(Scotland) Steven Nicholas	9	East Fife
10	(Scotland) William Martin	9	Elgin City

== Attendance ==
The average attendance for Scottish Third Division clubs for the 2004/05 season are shown below:

Team	Average
Gretna	895
East Fife	663
Peterhead	640
Queen's Park	593
Elgin City	455
Stenhousemuir	432
Montrose	390
Albion Rovers	322
East Stirlingshire	293
Cowdenbeath	262
