= Anthony Low (footballer) =

Scottish footballer (born 1983)

Personal information
- Date of birth: 18 August 1983 (age 43)
- Place of birth: Glasgow, Scotland
- Height: 1.73 m (5 ft 8 in)
- Position: Midfielder

Youth career
- 2000–2002: Inverness Caledonian Thistle

Senior career*
| Years | Team | Apps | (Gls) |
| 2001–2002 | → Brora Rangers (loan) | | |
| 2002–2004 | Inverness Caledonian Thistle | 16 | (1) |
| 2003–2004 | → Albion Rovers (loan) | | |
| 2004–2005 | Clachnacuddin | | |
| 2005–2006 | Nairn County | | |
| 2006–2007 | Peterhead | | |
| 2007–2008 | Buckie Thistle | | |
| 2008–2009 | Elgin City | 6 | (0) |
| 2009–2012 | Nairn County | | |
| 2014 | Peterhead | | |
- * Club domestic league appearances and goals

Anthony Low (born 18 August 1983) is a Scottish former footballer who played as a midfielder for Inverness Caledonian Thistle, Brora Rangers, Albion Rovers, Clachnacuddin, Buckie Thistle, Elgin City, Nairn County and Peterhead.

== Career ==
=== Brora Rangers (loan) ===
Before Low joined the Inverness first team, Low went out on loan to local Highland League side, Brora Rangers, finishing the season in 8th place.

=== Inverness Caledonian Thistle ===
Low joined Scottish First Division side Inverness Caledonian Thistle in 2002, making his professional debut in a Challenge Cup loss against Berwick Rangers, before making his league debut in a 2–1 home loss to Falkirk on 17 August. Anthony scored his first, and only, goal in a 2–0 home win against Arbroath.

The following season, he made only one appearance, a 1–1 league draw away to Highland Derby rivals, Ross County on 30 August.

=== Albion Rovers (loan) ===
On deadline day in August 2003, Anthony was brought to Third Division side, Albion Rovers on loan. He left the club at the end of the season and rejoining, now Scottish Premier League side, Inverness.

=== Highland League ===
In 2004, Anthony left Inverness Caledonian Thistle after being deemed surplus to requirement, and joined fellow Invernessians and Highland League Champions, Clachnacuddin. However, after a year long spell, he left, and joined Nairn County, on a year long deal, where he won the North of Scotland Cup. In 2006, he briefly joined Second Division side, Peterhead, before leaving a year later and playing for a year at Buckie Thistle winning the Aberdeenshire Shield. In 2008, he returned to the SFL, this time joining Elgin City in the Third Division, where he made six appearances. In 2009 he returned to Nairn County, where he played for four years, winning the Highland League Cup. At the end of the 2011–12 season, Low took a break from football, before returning to the game for one more year at his former side, Peterhead.

== Honours ==
Inverness Caledonian Thistle

- Inverness Cup: 2001–02
- Scottish First Division: 2003–04

Nairn County

- North of Scotland Cup: 2005–06
- Highland League Cup: 2010–11

Buckie Thistle

- Aberdeenshire Shield: 2007–08
