= Beau Busch =

Australian soccer player (born 1984)

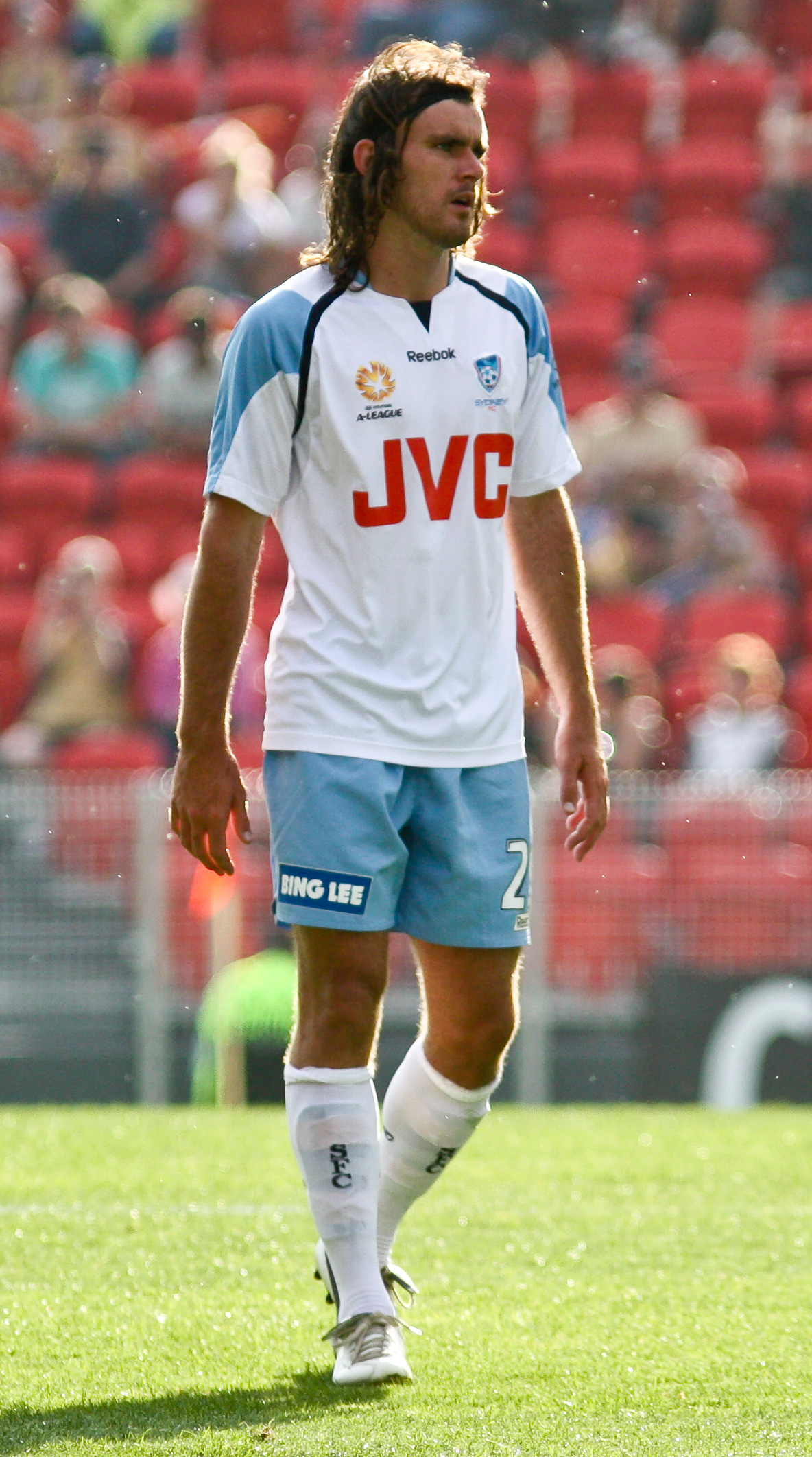
- Busch playing for Sydney FC in 2008

Personal information
- Full name: Beau Busch
- Date of birth: 16 March 1984 (age 42)
- Place of birth: Newcastle, Australia
- Height: 1.80 m (5 ft 11 in)
- Positions: Centre back; right back

Youth career
- Kahibah Rams

Senior career*
Years	Team	Apps	(Gls)
2003–2004	Hamilton Olympic		
2005–2007	Broadmeadow Magic		
2008–2009	Manly United	19	(2)
2008	→ Newcastle Jets (loan)	0	(0)
2008–2009	→ Sydney FC (loan)	10	(0)
2009–2010	North Queensland Fury	8	(0)
2010–2011	Manly United	12	(0)
2011–2012	Arbroath	21	(0)
- * Club domestic league appearances and goals as of 23 May 2012

Beau Busch (born 16 March 1984) is an Australian former footballer and, since July 2020, the co-Chief Executive of Professional Footballers Australia (PFA), alongside Kate Gill.

== Club career ==
Busch trialled with the Newcastle Jets during the 2008 pre-season. On 25 October 2008, Busch made his debut for Sydney FC against Melbourne Victory as a short-term injury replacement. Busch's stellar performances for the North Queensland Fury gave him cult status amongst Fury fans, with the forming of the Busch supporter group the Beau Bro's. The Beau Bro's signature chant is to the tune of the Kasabian track Vlad the Impailer with 'Beau Busch' replacing the lyrics 'get loose'. On 25 June 2011, Busch moved to Scottish club Arbroath. He retired from professional football in 2012.

== Post-playing career ==
Busch returned to Australia in 2013 to take up a position with Professional Footballers Australia as their Media & Communications Manager. He subsequently worked as Head of Player Relations before being named co-Chief Executive in 2020.
