= 2006–07 Inverness Caledonian Thistle F.C. season =

Scottish football club season

Inverness Caledonian Thistle F.C.
2006–07 season
- Manager: Charlie Christie
- Scottish Premier League: 8th
- Scottish Cup: Quarter-final
- Scottish League Cup: 3rd Round
- Top goalscorer: League: Craig Dargo (10); All: Craig Dargo (12)
- Highest home attendance: 7,522 vs. Rangers, 27 December 2006
- Lowest home attendance: 1,085 vs. Dumbarton, 23 August 2006

Inverness Caledonian Thistle F.C. in their 13th season in Scottish football competing in the Scottish Premier League, Scottish League Cup and the Scottish Cup in season 2006–07.

== Results ==
=== Scottish Premier League ===
| Match Day | Date | Opponent | H/A | Score | ICT Scorer(s) | Attendance |
|---|---|---|---|---|---|---|
| 1 | 29 July | St Mirren | H | 1-2 | Dargo | 4,561 |
| 2 | 5 August | Aberdeen | A | 1–1 | Wilson | 7,512 |
| 3 | 12 August | Hibernian | H | 0–0 | | 5,005 |
| 4 | 20 August | Celtic | H | 1–1 | Munro | 7,332 |
| 5 | 26 August | Heart of Midlothian | A | 1–4 | Bayne | 15,912 |
| 6 | 9 September | Motherwell | A | 4–1 | Tokely, Dargo, Munro, McAllister | 4,091 |
| 7 | 16 September | Dundee United | H | 0–0 | | 3,586 |
| 8 | 23 September | Kilmarnock | A | 1–1 | Dargo | 4,809 |
| 9 | 30 September | Dunfermline Athletic | H | 1–0 | Tokely | 3,517 |
| 10 | 14 October | Rangers | A | 1–0 | Bayne | 49,494 |
| 11 | 21 October | Falkirk | H | 3–2 | Rankin (2), Dargo | 3,749 |
| 12 | 28 October | St Mirren | A | 1–1 | Dargo | 4,432 |
| 13 | 6 November | Aberdeen | H | 1–1 | Bayne | 5,744 |
| 14 | 11 November | Hibernian | A | 0–2 | | 12,868 |
| 15 | 18 November | Celtic | A | 0–3 | | 56,637 |
| 16 | 25 November | Heart of Midlothian | H | 0–0 | | 5,603 |
| 17 | 2 December | Motherwell | H | 0–1 | | 3,668 |
| 18 | 9 December | Dundee United | A | 1-3 | Wilson | 5,294 |
| 19 | 16 December | Kilmarnock | H | 3-4 | Dods (2), Dargo | 3,728 |
| 20 | 23 December | Dunfermline Athletic | A | 0–0 | | 4,216 |
| 21 | 27 December | Rangers | H | 2–1 | Dods, Rankin | 7,522 |
| 22 | 30 December | Falkirk | A | 1–3 | Rankin | 4,516 |
| 23 | 1 January | St Mirren | H | 2–1 | Bayne, Wyness | 4,246 |
| 24 | 13 January | Aberdeen | A | 1–1 | Rankin | 10,300 |
| 25 | 21 January | Hibernian | H | 3–0 | Dargo, McBain, Wilson | 4,577 |
| 26 | 28 January | Celtic | H | 1-2 | Bayne | 7,484 |
| 27 | 10 February | Heart of Midlothian | A | 0–1 | | 16,631 |
| 28 | 17 February | Motherwell | A | 0–1 | | 4,258 |
| 29 | 3 March | Dundee United | H | 1–0 | Wilson | 3,901 |
| 30 | 10 March | Kilmarnock | A | 2–3 | Paatelainen, Dods | 7,630 |
| 31 | 17 March | Dunfermline Athletic | H | 1–3 | Paatelainen | 4,447 |
| 32 | 31 March | Rangers | A | 1–1 | Dargo | 50,278 |
| 33 | 7 April | Falkirk | A | 1–1 | Rankin | 4,435 |
| 34 | 21 April | Motherwell | H | 2–0 | Dargo (2) | 3,804 |
| 35 | 28 April | Dundee United | A | 1–1 | Bayne | 5,273 |
| 36 | 5 May | Falkirk | A | 0-1 | | 3,129 |
| 37 | 12 May | Dunfermline Athletic | H | 2–1 | Hastings, McAllister | 6,464 |
| 38 | 19 May | St Mirren | A | 1-0 | McCaffrey | 4,834 |

==== Final League table ====
| Pos | Team | Pld | W | D | L | GF | GA | GD | Pts | Qualification or relegation (Note: Teams played each other three times (33 matches), before the league split into two groups (the top six and the bottom six) for the last five matches.) |
|---|---|---|---|---|---|---|---|---|---|---|
| 6 | Hibernian | 38 | 13 | 10 | 15 | 56 | 46 | +10 | 49 | |
| 7 | Falkirk | 38 | 15 | 5 | 18 | 49 | 47 | +2 | 50 | |
| 8 | Inverness Caledonian Thistle | 38 | 11 | 13 | 14 | 42 | 48 | −6 | 46 | |
| 9 | Dundee United | 38 | 10 | 12 | 16 | 40 | 59 | −19 | 42 | |
| 10 | Motherwell | 38 | 10 | 8 | 20 | 41 | 61 | −20 | 38 | |

Source: Scottish Professional Football League
Rules for classification: 1) Points; 2) Goal difference; 3) Goals scored

=== Scottish League Cup ===
| Round | Date | Opponent | H/A | Score | ICT Scorer(s) | Attendance |
|---|---|---|---|---|---|---|
| R2 | 23 August | Dumbarton | H | 3–1 | Wyness, Bayne, McAllister | 1,085 |
| R3 | 19 September | Falkirk | H | 0–1 | | 1,198 |

=== Scottish Cup ===
| Round | Date | Opponent | H/A | Score | ICT Scorer(s) | Attendance |
|---|---|---|---|---|---|---|
| R3 | 6 January | Stirling Albion | A | 6–1 | Dargo (2), Wyness, McBain, | 1,521 |
| R4 | 3 February | Dundee United | H | 1–0 | Duncan | 3,402 |
| QF | 25 February | Celtic | H | 1–2 | Bayne | 7,119 |
