= Liam Keogh =

Scottish footballer (born 1981)

Personal information
- Date of birth: 6 September 1981 (age 45)
- Place of birth: Aberdeen, Scotland
- Position: Midfielder

Senior career*
Years	Team	Apps	(Gls)
1997–2002	Celtic	0	(0)
2001	→ Forfar Athletic (loan)	13	(3)
2002	St Mirren	1	(0)
2002–2007	Inverness Caledonian Thistle	86	(3)
2007	Peterhead	14	(0)
2008–2009	Elgin City	5	(0)
Total		119	(6)
- * Club domestic league appearances and goals

Liam Keogh (born 6 September 1981) is a Scottish former professional footballer, who played as a midfielder.

He began his career as a junior with Celtic in September 1997, but never appeared in the Celtic first team. He made his league debut on loan to Forfar Athletic in March 2001, scoring 3 times in 13 games during his loan spell.

Keogh left Celtic to join St Mirren on a free transfer in March 2002. In August 2002, after just one appearance, as a substitute, for St Mirren he joined Inverness Caledonian Thistle.

In January 2007, with his contract due to expire at the end of the season, he was signed by Peterhead. He then played for Elgin City for one season.

He is the father of current Inverness Caledonian Thistle midfielder, Shae Keogh.
