= Darran Thomson =

Scottish footballer

Personal information
- Date of birth: 31 January 1984 (age 42)
- Place of birth: Edinburgh, Scotland
- Position: Midfielder

Youth career
- –2002: Hibernian

Senior career*
Years	Team	Apps	(Gls)
2002–2003	Hibernian	2	(0)
2003–2004	Inverness Caledonian Thistle	22	(1)
2004–2005	Elgin City	3	(0)
2005	Albion Rovers	3	(0)
2005–2006	Alloa Athletic	9	(1)
2006	Cowdenbeath	10	(0)
2006–2010	Bonnyrigg Rose		
2010–2011	Arbroath	6	(0)
2011–2012	Spartans	0	(0)
2012–	Vale of Leithen	6	(0)
- * Club domestic league appearances and goals as of 23 September 2011

Darran Thomson (born 31 January 1984) is a Scottish footballer.

Thomson played in two games for Hibernian in the Scottish Premier League towards the end of the 2002–03 season as he attempted to earn a new contract from manager Bobby Williamson. Thomson was one of a group of young players, including Scott Brown, Derek Riordan and Steven Whittaker, who were given a chance in the Hibs first team at that time.

Thomson left Hibs in the 2003 close season, however, for the security of a two-year contract offer from First Division club Inverness Caledonian Thistle. Despite playing in the side that gained promotion to the Scottish Premier League and won the Challenge Cup in the 2003–04 season, Thomson was eventually released by Inverness towards the end of that contract. After short stints with several lower division Scottish Football League clubs, Thomson moved into junior football with Bonnyrigg Rose.

In October 2010, Thomson returned to the SFL to sign for Arbroath.
