= Paul Ritchie (footballer, born 1969) =

Scottish footballer

Personal information
- Full name: Paul Michael Ritchie
- Date of birth: 25 January 1969 (age 57)
- Place of birth: St Andrews, Scotland
- Position: Striker

Youth career
- 1986–1987: Kirkcaldy YMCA

Senior career*
Years	Team	Apps	(Gls)
1987–1988	Dundee	0	(0)
1988	→ Brechin City (loan)	8	(3)
1988–1992	Brechin City	118	(42)
1992–1995	Dundee	57	(8)
1993	→ Gillingham (loan)	6	(3)
1994	→ Portadown (loan)	5	(2)
1994–1995	→ Gillingham (loan)	5	(1)
1995	Derry City	0	(0)
1995–1996	Happy Valley	18	(16)
1996–1998	Hamilton Academical	65	(38)
1998–2000	Yee Hope	40	(30)
2000–2001	Happy Valley	21	(15)
2001–2004	Inverness Caledonian Thistle	103	(47)
2004–2006	Brechin City	53	(15)
2006	Partick Thistle	11	(1)
2006–2007	East Fife	23	(5)
Total		449	(163)
- * Club domestic league appearances and goals

Paul Michael Ritchie (born 25 January 1969) is a Scottish former football player who played for several clubs in Scotland, England, Northern Ireland and Hong Kong over a 20-year career.

He was voted Scottish PFA Second Division Player of the Year and won the Daily Record Golden Shot award (first player to reach 30 goals in the SFL) in 1996–97.

Preceded by Paul Wood	Hong Kong First Division League top scorer 1998–99	Succeeded by Leandro
Preceded by Leandro	Hong Kong First Division League top scorer 2000–01	Succeeded by Cornelius Udebuluzor
