= Steve Hislop (footballer) =

Scottish footballer

Personal information
- Full name: Steven James Hislop
- Date of birth: 14 June 1978 (age 48)
- Place of birth: Edinburgh, Scotland
- Position: Striker

Youth career
- Easthouses U21

Senior career*
Years	Team	Apps	(Gls)
2000–2001	East Stirlingshire	36	(15)
2001–2003	Ross County	47	(17)
2003–2005	Inverness Caledonian Thistle	48	(11)
2005–2006	Gillingham	8	(0)
2006–2007	Livingston	23	(1)
2007–2009	Raith Rovers	55	(15)
2009–2010	Arbroath	22	(6)
2010–2012	East Fife	50	(7)
2012–2014	Bo'ness United		
2014–2015	Bonnyrigg Rose Athletic		

Managerial career
- 2015–2016: Arbroath (assistant)
- 2016: Whitehill Welfare
- 2016–2017: Linlithgow Rose (assistant)
- 2017–2020: Broxburn Athletic (assistant)
- 2022–2023: Tranent Juniors (assistant)
- * Club domestic league appearances and goals

Steven James Hislop (born 14 June 1978) is a Scottish former footballer. He played in the Scottish Premier League for Inverness Caledonian Thistle and Livingston.

== Career ==
=== Playing ===
Hislop began his professional career with East Stirlingshire at the age of 22 before moving to full-time football with Ross County a year later. A move to Inverness Caledonian Thistle in early 2003 saw Hislop win the Scottish Challenge Cup and the Scottish Football League First Division title. He had a short spell in England with Gillingham before returning to Scotland with Livingston in January 2006.

Hislop went on to play for Raith Rovers where he won a Scottish Football League Second Division title before turning part-time with Arbroath and East Fife while opening in business as an optician.

Hislop joined Junior club Bo'ness United in June 2012 and moved on to Bonnyrigg Rose Athletic in the summer of 2014 where he assumed a player/coach role.

In 2013, he represented the Scotland Junior International Team at the Junior International Quadrangular Tournament scoring a hat trick in 6–0 against The Isle of Man.

=== Coaching ===
After retiring from football, Hislop took up the role of assistant manager at Arbroath, working alongside Todd Lumsden. On 31 March 2016, Hislop became manager of Whitehill Welfare in the Lowland Football League, however, in November 2016, after just seven months with the club, Hislop resigned from his position as manager to take up the role of assistant manager to Todd Lumsden at Linlithgow Rose. Hislop and manager Lumsden were fired on 2 May 2017.

On 1 September 2022, Hislop was appointed assistant manager of Colin Nish at Tranent Juniors.
