= 2004–05 Dumbarton F.C. season =

Dumbarton
2004-05 season
- Manager: Brian Fairlie/Paul Martin
- Stadium: Strathclyde Homes Stadium, Dumbarton
- Scottish League Division 2: 7th
- Scottish Cup: First Round
- Scottish League Cup: Second Round
- Bell's Challenge Cup: First Round
- Top goalscorer: League: Iain Russell (11); All: Iain Russell (13)
- Highest home attendance: 1,446
- Lowest home attendance: 522
- Average home league attendance: 900

Season 2004–05 was the 121st football season in which Dumbarton competed at a Scottish national level, entering the Scottish Football League for the 99th time, the Scottish Cup for the 110th time, the Scottish League Cup for the 58th time and the Scottish Challenge Cup for the 14th time.

== Overview ==
The near miss in gaining promotion the previous season had ensured that there was considerable confidence in the team going into season 2004-05 to make that further step. However, despite a successful opening spell, results were not as good as anticipated, and in December Brian Fairlie would make way for Paul Martin in the manager's seat. There was to be no great resurgence in results and in the end a disappointing 7th place was achieved.

In the Scottish Cup, after defeating Cowdenbeath in the first round, it would be Berwick Rangers that would advance from the second round tie, after a drawn match.

In the League Cup, Ross County would prove to be too strong in the first round.

Finally, in the Scottish Challenge Cup, it was another first round exit, this time to Stirling Albion.

Locally, in the Stirlingshire Cup, Dumbarton won one and lost one of their opening group ties, and would take no further part in the competition.

== Results & fixtures ==
Win Draw Loss

=== Scottish Second Division ===
7 August 2004 Scottish Second Division	Dumbarton	1–0	Ayr United	Dumbarton Football Stadium
	Dillon 18'	BBC Report		Attendance: 1,016; Referee: C Melville

14 August 2004 Scottish Second Division	Arbroath	0–2	Dumbarton	Gayfield Park
		BBC Report	Russell 8', 83'	Attendance: 505; Referee: C Conroy

21 August 2004 Scottish Second Division	Dumbarton	0–3	Morton	Dumbarton Football Stadium
		BBC Report	Walker, J 32'; Weatherston 67'; Greacen 84'	Attendance: 1,505; Referee: I Frickleton

28 August 2004 Scottish Second Division	Dumbarton	0–1	Forfar Athletic	Dumbarton Football Stadium
		BBC Report	Tosh 54'	Attendance: 723; Referee: E Smith

4 September 2004 Scottish Second Division	Berwick Rangers	0–4	Dumbarton	Shielfield Park
		BBC Report	Annand 30', 45', 49'; Donald 74'	Attendance: 412; Referee: C Murray

11 September 2004 Scottish Second Division	Dumbarton	1–3	Stranraer	Dumbarton Football Stadium
	Annand 48'	BBC Report	Finlayson 2'; Guy 79' (pen.); Graham 85'	Attendance: 851; Referee: C Boyle

18 September 2004 Scottish Second Division	Alloa Athletic	3–2	Dumbarton	Recreation Park, Alloa
	McMillan 75'; Bolochoweckjy 80'; Walker 89'	BBC Report	Rodgers 11'; Russell 57'	Attendance: 505; Referee: A Freeland

25 September 2004 Scottish Second Division	Dumbarton	1–1	Stirling Albion	Dumbarton Football Stadium
	Russell 30'	BBC Report	Glancy 46'	Attendance: 982; Referee: A Hunter

2 October 2004 Scottish Second Division	Brechin City	4–0	Dumbarton	Glebe Park, Brechin
	White 51'; Ritchie 69', 81', 85'	BBC Report		Attendance: 503; Referee: C Mackay

16 October 2004 Scottish Second Division	Dumbarton	1–3	Arbroath	Dumbarton Football Stadium
	McEwan 77' (pen.)	BBC Report	Swankie 29', 66'; McMullen 42'	Attendance: 772; Referee: M Tumilty

23 October 2004 Scottish Second Division	Ayr United	0–1	Dumbarton	Somerset Park
		BBC Report	Rodgers 88'	Attendance: 1,533

30 October 2004 Scottish Second Division	Forfar Athletic	0–2	Dumbarton	Station Park, Forfar
		BBC Report	Dunn 58', 72'	Attendance: 486; Referee: C Hardie

6 November 2004 Scottish Second Division	Dumbarton	3–1	Berwick Rangers	Dumbarton Football Stadium
	Boyle 22'; Rodgers 33'; Holmes 66'	BBC Report	Gordon 56'	Attendance: 790; Referee: M Sproule

13 November 2004 Scottish Second Division	Stranraer	1–0	Dumbarton	Stair Park
	Guy 52' (pen.)	BBC Report		Attendance: 557

30 November 2004 Scottish Second Division	Dumbarton	0–1	Alloa Athletic	Dumbarton Football Stadium
		BBC Report	Hill 74'	Attendance: 522; Referee: E Smith

4 December 2004 Scottish Second Division	Stirling Albion	1–0	Dumbarton	Forthbank Stadium
	Gethins 51'	BBC Report		Attendance: 688

27 December 2004 Scottish Second Division	Dumbarton	1–1	Ayr United	Dumbarton Football Stadium
	Russell 7'	BBC Report	Connolly 9'	Attendance: 1,118; Referee: M Sproule

1 January 2005 Scottish Second Division	Morton	3–0	Dumbarton	Cappielow
	Weatherston 24' (pen.); McCluskey 54'; Templeman 63'	BBC Report		Attendance: 2,746; Referee: B Winter

3 January 2005 Scottish Second Division	Dumbarton	1–1	Forfar Athletic	Dumbarton Football Stadium
	Rodgers 66'	BBC Report	Tosh 57'	Attendance: 714; Referee: C Richmond

15 January 2005 Scottish Second Division	Berwick Rangers	0–3	Dumbarton	Shielfield Park
		BBC Report	Dillon 38'; Rodgers 58'; Annand 67'	Attendance: 322; Referee: M Tumilty

29 January 2005 Scottish Second Division	Alloa Athletic	4–2	Dumbarton	Recreation Park, Alloa
	Ross 7'; Quitongo 10'; Brown 23'; Ferguson 27'	BBC Report	McKinstrey 58'; Rodgers 82'	Attendance: 608; Referee: I Frickleton

5 February 2005 Scottish Second Division	Dumbarton	0–2	Stirling Albion	Dumbarton Football Stadium
		BBC Report	Dunn 16', 41'	Attendance: 965; Referee: C Hardie

12 February 2005 Scottish Second Division	Brechin City	0–2	Dumbarton	Glebe Park, Brechin
		BBC Report	Annand 20'; McKinstrey 36'	Attendance: 595; Referee: C Melville

19 February 2005 Scottish Second Division	Dumbarton	3–0	Morton	Dumbarton Football Stadium
	Ronald 24'; Russell 42', 67'	BBC Report		Attendance: 1,446; Referee: C Boyle

26 February 2005 Scottish Second Division	Dumbarton	2–1	Arbroath	Gayfield Park
	Swankie 28'; Henslee 77'	BBC Report	Annand 78'	Attendance: 502; Referee: J Downie

1 March 2005 Scottish Second Division	Dumbarton	1–1	Brechin City	Dumbarton Football Stadium
	McEwan 21' (pen.)	BBC Report	Callagan 2'	Attendance: 554; Referee: J Downie

5 March 2005 Scottish Second Division	Dumbarton	1–1	Berwick Rangers	Dumbarton Football Stadium
	McEwan 88' (pen.)	BBC Report	Smith 87'	Attendance: 690; Referee: A Hunter

12 March 2005 Scottish Second Division	Forfar Athletic	6-0	Dumbarton	Station Park, Forfar
	Shields 40', 45', 57'; King 51'; McClune 64'; Tosh 72'	BBC Report		Attendance: 443; Referee: S MacDonald

19 March 2005 Scottish Second Division	Stranraer	2–1	Dumbarton	Stair Park
	Moore 21'; McManus 28'	BBC Report	McEwan 89' (pen.)	Attendance: 455; Referee: W Young

26 March 2005 Scottish Second Division	Dumbarton	1–1	Stranraer	Dumbarton Football Stadium
	Russell		Goal	Attendance: 848

2 April 2005 Scottish Second Division	Dumbarton	3–2	Alloa Athletic	Dumbarton Football Stadium
	Russell 34', 58', 87'	BBC Report	Brown 1'; Hamilton 57'	Attendance: 787; Referee: C Murray

9 April 2005 Scottish Second Division	Dumbarton	1–1	Brechin City	Dumbarton Football Stadium
	Dillon 53'	BBC Report	Sharp 71'	Attendance: 773; Referee: I Frickleton

16 April 2005 Scottish Second Division	Stirling Albion	3–0	Dumbarton	Forthbank Stadium
	Wilson 19'; MacDonald 45'; Nugent 90'	BBC Report		Attendance: 705; Referee: D Somers

23 April 2005 Scottish Second Division	Morton	0–0	Dumbarton	Cappielow
		BBC Report		Attendance: 3,229; Referee: H Dallas

30 April 2005 Scottish Second Division	Dumbarton	3–0	Arbroath	Dumbarton Football Stadium
	Boyle 69'; Dillon 78'; Gemmell 82'	BBC Report		Attendance: 1,197; Referee: M Sproule

7 May 2005 Scottish Second Division	Ayr United	1–1	Dumbarton	Somerset Park
	Smyth 76'	BBC Report	Gemmell 19'	Attendance: 1,277; Referee: A Hunter

=== Bell's League Challenge Cup ===
31 July 2004 Scottish Challenge Cup round 1	Dumbarton	1–2	Stirling Albion	Dumbarton Football Stadium
	Bonar 5'	BBC report	McLean 45', 47'	Attendance: 709

=== CIS League Cup ===
10 August 2004 Scottish League Cup round 1	Dumbarton	1–3	Ross County	Dumbarton Football Stadium
	Russell	BBC Report	Burke	Attendance: 437

=== Scottish Cup ===
27 November 2004 Scottish Cup round 1	Cowdenbeath	2–3	Dumbarton	Central Park, Cowdenbeath
	Gribben 32'; Buchanan 90'	BBC Report	McEwan 38' (pen.); Dunn 50'; Russell 80'	Attendance: 279; Referee: J Downie

11 December 2004 Scottish Cup round 2	Dumbarton	1–1	Berwick Rangers	Dumbarton Football Stadium
	Dillon 37'	BBC Report	McNicholl 6'	Attendance: 622; Referee: M Tumilty

18 December 2004 Scottish Cup round 2R	Berwick Rangers	3–1	Dumbarton	Shielfield Park
	Clark 30'; Connelly 73'; Hutchison 89'	BBC Report	Annand 24'	Attendance: 318; Referee: M Tumilty

=== Stirlingshire Cup ===
3 August 2004 Group stage	Dumbarton	1–2	Falkirk	Dumbarton Football Stadium
	McEwan		Latapy 29'; Motinho 64'	Attendance: 403; Referee: C Melville

17 August 2004 Group stage	East Stirlingshire	0–3	Dumbarton	Firs Park
			Rodgers; Herd; Russell	Attendance: 162

=== Pre-season and mid-season friendlies ===
17 July 2004 Friendly	Royal Navy XI	1–1	Dumbarton
	Goal		Russell

17 July 2004 Friendly	(England) Billingham Town	1–2	Dumbarton	Billingham
	Goal		Ronald; Russell

20 July 2004 Friendly	Dumbarton	2–1	St Mirren	Dumbarton Football Stadium
	Ronald; Russell		Goal

24 July 2004 Friendly	Dumbarton	0–4	(England) Macclesfield Town	Dumbarton Football Stadium
			Parkin 9'; Whittaker 34', 64'; Mills 62'	Attendance: 389; Referee: C Hardie

27 July 2004 Friendly	Pollok	3–0	Dumbarton	Newlandsfield Park
	Goal			Attendance: 250

25 January 2005 Friendly	Dumbarton	2–1	St Mirren	Dumbarton Football Stadium
	Gemmell; Holmes		Goal

== League table ==
Pos	Team	Pld	W	D	L	GF	GA	GD	Pts	Promotion or relegation
5	Forfar Athletic	36	13	8	15	51	45	+6	47	
6	Alloa Athletic	36	12	10	14	66	68	−2	46	
7	Dumbarton	36	11	9	16	43	53	−10	42	
8	Ayr United	36	11	9	16	39	54	−15	42	
9	Arbroath (R)	36	10	8	18	49	73	−24	38	Relegation to the Third Division

Source: "2004-2005 Second Division - SPFL Archive". SPFL (in Malay).
Rules for classification: 1) points; 2) goal difference; 3) number of goals scored.
(R) Relegated

== Player statistics ==
=== Squad ===
No.	Pos	Nat	Player	Total		Second Division		League Cup		Challenge Cup		Scottish Cup	
No.	Pos	Nat	Player	Apps	Goals	Apps	Goals	Apps	Goals	Apps	Goals	Apps	Goals
	GK	(Scotland) SCO	Stephen Grindlay	35	0	30+0	0	1+0	0	1+0	0	3+0	0
	GK	(Scotland) SCO	John Wight	6	0	6+0	0	0+0	0	0+0	0	0+0	0
	DF	(Scotland) SCO	Derek Allan	6	0	4+1	0	0+0	0	1+0	0	0+0	0
	DF	(Scotland) SCO	Karl Anderson	1	0	1+0	0	0+0	0	0+0	0	0+0	0
	DF	(Scotland) SCO	Craig Brittain	38	0	32+1	0	1+0	0	1+0	0	3+0	0
	DF	(Scotland) SCO	Mark Dempsie	14	0	14+0	0	0+0	0	0+0	0	0+0	0
	DF	(Scotland) SCO	Ian Dobbins	30	0	24+2	0	1+0	0	0+0	0	3+0	0
	DF	(Scotland) SCO	Craig McEwan	36	5	31+0	4	1+0	0	1+0	0	3+0	1
	DF	(Scotland) SCO	James McKinstry	37	2	28+4	2	1+0	0	1+0	0	3+0	0
	DF	(Scotland) SCO	Robert Walker	16	0	16+0	0	0+0	0	0+0	0	0+0	0
	MF	(Scotland) SCO	James Allan	12	0	10+2	0	0+0	0	0+0	0	0+0	0
	MF	(Scotland) SCO	Steven Bonar	22	1	15+2	0	1+0	0	1+0	1	3+0	0
	MF	(Scotland) SCO	Chris Boyle	26	2	18+4	2	0+1	0	0+0	0	1+2	0
	MF	(Scotland) SCO	Mark Bradley	17	0	3+12	0	0+0	0	0+1	0	0+1	0
	MF	(Scotland) SCO	John Dillon	36	5	26+5	4	1+0	0	1+0	0	3+0	1
	MF	(Scotland) SCO	Barry Donald	28	1	19+4	1	1+0	0	1+0	0	3+0	0
	MF	(Scotland) SCO	Robert Dunn	16	3	8+6	2	0+0	0	0+1	0	1+0	1
	MF	(Scotland) SCO	Graeme Holmes	12	1	8+4	1	0+0	0	0+0	0	0+0	0
	MF	(Scotland) SCO	Chris McGroarty	7	0	4+2	0	0+0	0	0+0	0	0+1	0
	FW	(Scotland) SCO	Eddie Annand	31	8	22+6	7	0+0	0	0+0	0	2+1	1
	FW	(Scotland) SCO	Ryan Borris	17	0	7+9	0	0+0	0	0+0	0	1+0	0
	FW	(Scotland) SCO	John Gemmell	16	2	8+8	2	0+0	0	0+0	0	0+0	0
	FW	(Scotland) SCO	Gordon Herd	4	0	2+1	0	0+0	0	0+1	0	0+0	0
	FW	(Scotland) SCO	Andy Rodgers	36	6	17+14	6	1+0	0	1+0	0	0+3	0
	FW	(Scotland) SCO	Paul Ronald	27	1	18+5	1	1+0	0	1+0	0	2+0	0
	FW	(Scotland) SCO	Iain Russell	37	13	25+7	11	1+0	1	1+0	0	2+1	1

=== Transfers ===
==== Players in ====
Player	From	Date
(Scotland) Derek Allan	(Scotland) Queen of the South	24 May 2004
(Scotland) Ryan Borris	(Scotland) St Peters Juv	7 Jun 2004
(Scotland) Robert Dunn	(Scotland) St Mirren	7 Jun 2004
(Scotland) Graeme Holmes	(Scotland) Dundee United (loan)	27 Aug 2004
(Scotland) Eddie Annand	(Scotland) St Mirren	28 Aug 2004
(Scotland) Karl Anderson	(Scotland) St Mirren	1 Sep 2004
(Scotland) Chris McGroarty	(Scotland) Airdrie United	23 Sep 2004
(Scotland) James Allan	(Scotland) Stirling Albion	22 Jan 2005
(Scotland) John Gemmell	(Scotland) Partick Thistle	26 Jan 2005
(Scotland) Robert Walker	(Scotland) Hamilton	30 Jan 2005
(Scotland) Mark Dempsie	(Scotland) St Mirren	9 Feb 2005

==== Players out ====
Player	To	Date
(Scotland) Neil Collins	(England) Sunderland	12 Aug 2004
(Scotland) Chris McGroarty		31 Dec 2004
(Scotland) Steven Bonar	(Scotland) Forfar Athletic	15 Jan 2005
(Scotland) Robert Dunn	(Scotland) Stirling Albion	21 Jan 2005
(Scotland) Derek Allan		24 Jan 2005
(Scotland) Steve Renicks	(Scotland) Bellshill Athletic	
(Scotland) Gordon Herd	(Scotland) Berwick Rangers	
(Norway) Bjorn Skjelbred	(Norway) FK Eik Tønsberg	
(Scotland) Steve Laidler	(England) Farnborough Town	

== Trivia ==
- The League match against Morton on 19 February marked Stephen Grindlay's 100th appearance for Dumbarton in all national competitions - the 127th Dumbarton player to reach this milestone.
- The League match against Arbroath on 26 February marked John Dillon's 200th appearance for Dumbarton in all national competitions - the 29th Dumbarton player to break the 'double century'.

== See also ==
- 2004–05 in Scottish football
