= 1992–93 Southampton F.C. season =

Southampton F.C.
1992–93 season
- Chairman: Guy Askham
- Manager: Ian Branfoot
- Stadium: The Dell
- FA Premier League: 18th
- FA Cup: Third round
- League Cup: Third round
- Top goalscorer: League: Matt Le Tissier (15); All: Matt Le Tissier (18)
- Highest home attendance: 19,654 v Tottenham Hotspur (15 August 1992)
- Lowest home attendance: 6,764 v Gillingham (7 October 1992)
- Average home league attendance: 15,148
- Biggest win: 3–0 v Gillingham (7 October 1992); 3–0 v Norwich City (10 February 1993)
- Biggest defeat: 2–5 v Sheffield Wednesday (12 April 1993)
Home colours	Away colours	Third colours

The 1992–93 Southampton F.C. season was the club's 92nd season of competitive football, their 23rd in the top flight of English football, and their first in the FA Premier League following its replacement of the First Division as the top flight. After a poor first season with manager Ian Branfoot in which the club finished 16th in the final year of the old First Division, the Saints faired even worse in the inaugural Premier League campaign, finishing 18th and avoiding relegation by a single point. Outside the league, the club were knocked out of both the FA Cup and the League Cup in only the third round.

After a final season in which he finished as the club's top scorer, striker Alan Shearer joined Blackburn Rovers, who had been newly promoted to the top flight, for a British record fee of £3.6 million. Neil Ruddock, Jon Gittens and Barry Horne also left in the summer, with Branfoot signing David Speedie, Kerry Dixon, Ken Monkou and Perry Groves to replace them. Southampton's inaugural FA Premier League campaign started in much the same form as their final First Division season had gone, with the club sitting in or just above the relegation zone for much of the first half of the year. A stronger run of form after Christmas saw the Saints climb as high as ninth in the table, which ultimately saved them from the drop ahead of six defeats from their last eight games.

In the FA Cup, Southampton were eliminated in the third round by Nottingham Forest, another club who were struggling against the risk of relegation from the FA Premier League (they would ultimately drop to the First Division, after finishing bottom of the league table). In the League Cup, the Saints beat fourth-flight side Gillingham in the second round (winning the second leg 3–0 after a goalless draw), before facing elimination at the hands of Crystal Palace who, like Nottingham Forest, would later be relegated from the FA Premier League. Along with the club's worst top-flight league finish since their relegation in 1973–74, this marked Southampton's worst FA Cup performance since 1988–89 and their worst League Cup performance since 1987–88.

Southampton used 25 players during the 1992–93 season and had 12 different goalscorers. Following Shearer's departure, Matt Le Tissier returned to his spot as the club's top scorer, with 18 goals across all competitions. Iain Dowie was second on 12 goals. Tim Flowers made the most appearances during the season, as the only player to feature in all 46 matches; Le Tissier followed on 44 appearances. The goalkeeper was also named Southampton F.C. Player of the Season, following Peter Shilton to become only the second player to win the award on two occasions. The average league attendance at The Dell during 1992–93 was 15,148. The highest attendance was 19,654 against Tottenham Hotspur in August and the lowest was 6,764 against Gillingham in October.

== Background and transfers ==
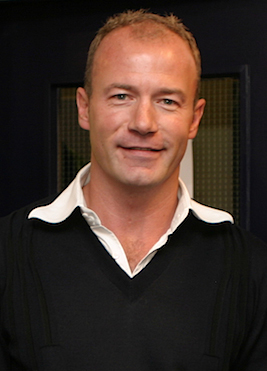
Alan Shearer became the most expensive player in British football when Blackburn Rovers paid Southampton £3.6 million for the striker in July 1992.

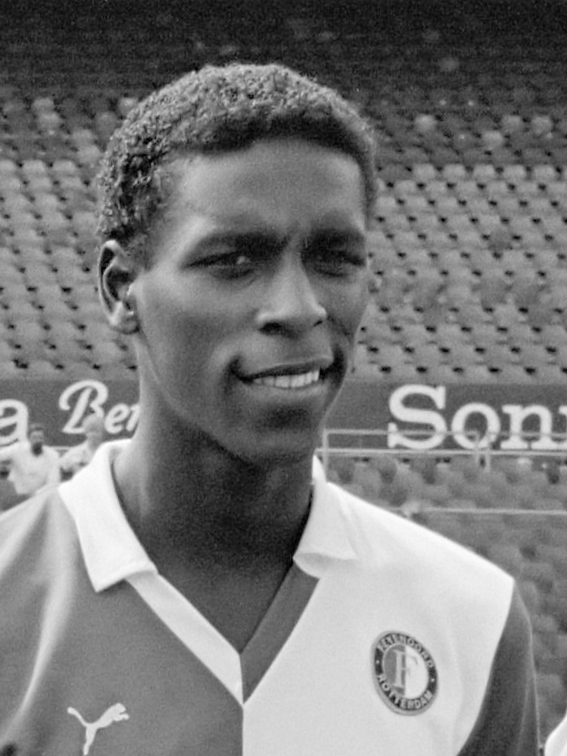
Southampton signed Dutch international centre-back Ken Monkou from Chelsea in August.

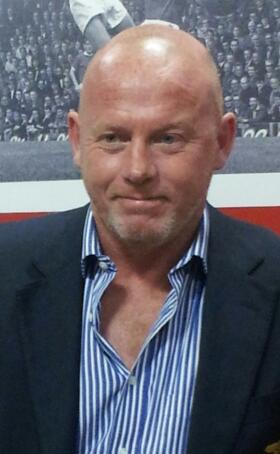
Winger Perry Groves joined from Arsenal for £750,000 a few days after Monkou's arrival.

Ahead of the 1992–93 season, Southampton received numerous offers for striker Alan Shearer, who had finished the last year as the club's top scorer and recently made his debut (and scored) for the England national team. Despite interest from Manchester United, he opted to move to Blackburn Rovers (who had been recently promoted to the FA Premier League) in July for a fee of £3.6 million, surpassing Liverpool's purchase of Dean Saunders a year earlier for £2.9 million. Saints manager Ian Branfoot wanted to sign Mike Newell in part-exchange for Shearer, but instead saw the arrival of David Speedie for an additional £400,000; Speedie himself was described as "reluctant" to move, claiming in later years that he felt "forced" into the transfer. Shearer has cited Blackburn's management team – including former England under-21 coach Ray Harford – as his main reason for joining.

Also leaving in the summer were centre-back Neil Ruddock, who was signed by Tottenham Hotspur for a tribunal-determined fee of £750,000; midfielder Barry Horne, who moved to Everton for £675,000; and Jon Gittens, who made his loan move to Middlesbrough permanent in a £350,000 deal. Branfoot's first signing of the 1992–93 transfer window was striker Kerry Dixon, who joined from Chelsea for a fee of £575,000, reuniting with former teammate Speedie when he joined the following week. In August, the manager signed another Chelsea player, Dutch international centre-back Ken Monkou, for whom they paid £750,000. The final addition of the summer came in the form of Arsenal winger Perry Groves, who joined a few days after Monkou for the same fee, despite "nursing an Achilles problem" which would ultimately end his professional playing career within a year.

Despite only joining in the summer, Speedie was put up for transfer by Southampton during the early stages of the season, after reportedly falling out with Branfoot, as well as teammates including Glenn Cockerill and Terry Hurlock. He subsequently spent short periods out on loan at Birmingham City and West Bromwich Albion, before finishing the season with West Ham United and helping the Hammers win promotion to the top flight. Dixon was also loaned out towards the end of the season, joining Luton Town in February 1993 and making the deal permanent early the next season. Other loan deals included defender Kevin Moore spending a month at Bristol Rovers in late-1992, midfielder David Lee joining Bolton Wanderers for a month in November, before joining permanently in December, and striker Paul Moody moving to Reading over the Christmas period. Alloa Athletic midfielder Paul Sheerin, Halesowen Town striker Frankie Bennett and Ayr United defender Derek Allan all joined Southampton during the course of the 1992–93 season for small fees.

Players transferred in

Name	Nationality	Pos.	Club	Date	Fee	Ref.
Kerry Dixon	England	FW	(England) Chelsea	19 July 1992	£575,000	
David Speedie	Scotland	FW	(England) Blackburn Rovers	27 July 1992	£400,000	
Ken Monkou	Netherlands	DF	(England) Chelsea	21 August 1992	£750,000	
Perry Groves	England	MF	(England) Arsenal	24 August 1992	£750,000	
Paul Sheerin	Scotland	MF	(Scotland) Alloa Athletic	1 October 1992	£65,000	
Frankie Bennett	England	FW	(England) Halesowen Town	24 February 1993	£5,000	
Derek Allan	Scotland	DF	(Scotland) Ayr United	16 March 1993	£75,000	

Players transferred out

Name	Nationality	Pos.	Club	Date	Fee	Ref.
Barry Horne	Wales	MF	(England) Everton	1 July 1992	£675,000	
Jon Gittens	England	MF	(England) Middlesbrough	27 July 1992	£350,000	
Alan Shearer	England	FW	(England) Blackburn Rovers	27 July 1992	£3,600,000	
Neil Ruddock	England	DF	(England) Tottenham Hotspur	29 July 1992	£750,000	
David Lee	England	MF	(England) Bolton Wanderers	December 1992	Unknown	

Players loaned out

Name	Nationality	Pos.	Club	Date from	Date to	Ref.
Kevin Moore	England	DF	(England) Bristol Rovers	October 1992	November 1992	
David Lee	England	MF	(England) Bolton Wanderers	November 1992	December 1992	
David Speedie	Scotland	FW	(England) Birmingham City	November 1992	December 1992	
Paul Moody	England	FW	(England) Reading	December 1992	January 1993	
David Speedie	Scotland	FW	(England) West Bromwich Albion	January 1993	February 1993	
Kerry Dixon	England	FW	(England) Luton Town	February 1993	End of season	
David Speedie	Scotland	FW	(England) West Ham United	March 1993	End of season	

== Pre-season friendlies ==
Ahead of the 1992–93 league campaign, Southampton played ten pre-season friendlies. The first two, which took place in May just after the end of the previous season, saw Southampton travel to Grand Cayman to compete in the Hampsteads International Cup alongside two national sides: Jamaica and the Cayman Islands. The Saints beat Jamaica 2–0 in the first game and drew 1–1 with the Cayman Islands in the second. After the summer break, in July the club faced Scottish First Division side Ayr United, which they lost 1–0. Later in the month, the Saints completed a tour of Sweden which included six friendlies in nine days: an 8–1 win over Trollhättan, a 2–1 win over Västra Frölunda, a 12–0 win over Värnamo (in which new signing Kerry Dixon scored five goals and Neil Maddison added a hat-trick), a 6–0 win over Gällstads, a 5–2 win over Vinninga, and a 5–1 win over Yngsjö. Back in the UK, Southampton beat Second Division side Swansea City 3–2 at Vetch Field eight days before the start of the league season.

May 1992 Hampsteads International Cup	Jamaica	0–2	Southampton	Grand Cayman
			Adams; Banger

May 1992 Hampsteads International Cup	Cayman Islands	1–1	Southampton	Grand Cayman
			Moody

21 July 1992 Friendly	Ayr United	1–0	Southampton	Ayr, Scotland
				Stadium: Somerset Park

27 July 1992 Friendly	Trollhättan	1–8	Southampton	Trollhättan, Sweden
			Adams; Cockerill; Dixon; Hall; Le Tissier; Moore; Speedie; Widdrington

28 July 1992 Friendly	Västra Frölunda	1–2	Southampton	Gothenburg, Sweden
			Le Tissier; Speedie

30 July 1992 Friendly	Värnamo	0–12	Southampton	Värnamo, Sweden
			Banger; Dixon; Dowie; Lee; Le Tissier; Maddison	Stadium: Finnvedsvallen

1 August 1992 Friendly	Gällstads	0–6	Southampton	Gällstad, Sweden
			Adams; Cockerill; Dowie; Le Tissier; Speedie

3 August 1992 Friendly	Vinninga	2–5	Southampton	Vinninga, Sweden
			Adams; Bound; Dixon; Le Tissier; Speedie

4 August 1992 Friendly	Yngsjö	1–5	Southampton	Yngsjö, Sweden
			Adams; Dodd; Speedie

7 August 1992 Friendly	Swansea City	2–3	Southampton	Swansea, Wales
			Dixon; Le Tissier	Stadium: Vetch Field

== FA Premier League ==
The 1992–93 season saw the introduction of the FA Premier League, which replaced the First Division of the English Football League as the top flight of football in England. The league was created primarily to allow clubs in the top flight to secure broadcasting deals independently of the Football League, in order to maximise revenue for the clubs and attract more talent to the division. The inaugural outing of the new league featured 22 clubs determined by the results of the previous season (19 First Division clubs and three promoted from the Second Division), with Southampton one of the founding members.

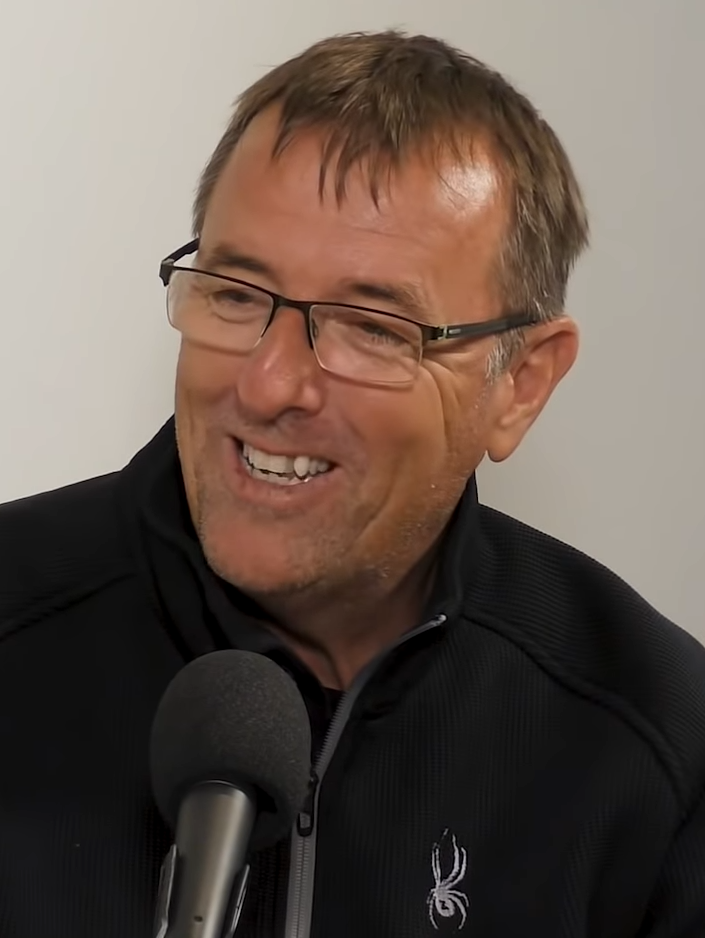
Matt Le Tissier scored 15 of Southampton's 54 league goals in 1992–93, finishing as their top scorer for the third time.

The season started poorly for Southampton. A goalless draw with Tottenham Hotspur on the opening day was followed by a 3–1 loss at Queens Park Rangers during which Micky Adams was sent off, although the left-back was involved more positively three days later when he scored the visitors' goal in a 1–1 draw at Aston Villa. After a late 1–0 loss at Manchester United courtesy of a penultimate-minute goal from new signing Dion Dublin, the Saints picked up their first win of the season at home to Middlesbrough, who had been recently promoted to the FA Premier League after finishing as runners-up in the Second Division; all three goals in the 2–1 affair were scored in the last 15 minutes of the game, with a Matt Le Tissier penalty and a Nicky Banger header securing the hosts' first victory of the campaign. 1–1 draws with FA Cup champions Liverpool and league champions Leeds United (featuring debut goals for Kerry Dixon and Perry Groves, respectively) flanked two more defeats, against league leaders Norwich City and Queens Park Rangers.

Following the Leeds game, Southampton sat 20th in the FA Premier League table, in the first of three relegation spots. The team's second win of the season came against Crystal Palace the next week, with Iain Dowie scoring both of the visitors' goals either side of half-time. The next week's 2–0 loss at Sheffield United marked the final appearance of summer signing David Speedie, who had fallen out with Branfoot and other players, and was subsequently loaned out to various clubs during the rest of the season. Following a 2–2 draw at home to Wimbledon and a 1–0 loss at Manchester City, the Saints started a six-game unbeaten run with a 1–0 win over strugglers Oldham Athletic, marking their best run of results of the whole season. The spell included a 2–1 win over bottom-placed Nottingham Forest and a 2–0 defeat of title hopefuls Arsenal.

After climbing as high as 13th in the table following the win over Arsenal, a run of three defeats and two draws over Christmas and new year saw them drop back down to 19th, just above the relegation zone. In January, the club picked up key wins over Crystal Palace and Aston Villa, the latter of whom were second in the table before the game. February brought a pair of wins over Norwich City, who were still challenging for the title, and Liverpool, which was followed by a narrow defeat at league leaders Manchester United. A run of four games unbeaten from late-February to mid-March saw the club climb into the top half of the table for the first time during the season, peaking at ninth following a hard-fought 4–3 win over Ipswich Town in which Le Tissier scored the winner in the last minute of the game, after a goal for each side within the closing ten minutes.

The victory over Ipswich was Southampton's penultimate win of the season, as they lost six of their last eight games and started to drop back towards the bottom of the league table again. The spell started with a closely-fought 4–3 defeat at Arsenal, who were occupying a mid-table spot at the time, which was followed by a 2–1 home loss to relegation-threatened Nottingham Forest in which Le Tissier missed a penalty for the first time on his 21st attempt. Another loss to mid-table side Coventry City was followed by the club's last win of the season, a 1–0 edging of Chelsea after which they remained 14th in the table. Sheffield Wednesday dealt Southampton their heaviest defeat of the season two days after the Chelsea game, thrashing the visiting Saints 5–2, before the Saints finished their debut FA Premier League campaign with a goalless draw at home to Everton, a 1–0 defeat at home to Manchester City, and a 4–3 loss at Oldham Athletic. The final game of the season gave the Latics a win which secured their FA Premier League status, as they equalled Crystal Palace's points tally and had a superior goal difference, while also featuring Le Tissier's second away hat-trick and first from open play.

Southampton's 18th-place finish in the inaugural FA Premier League was the club's lowest finishing position in the top flight since they were last relegated from the First Division in the 1973–74 season.

=== List of match results ===
15 August 1992 1	Southampton	0–0	Tottenham Hotspur	Southampton
				Stadium: The Dell; Attendance: 19,654; Referee: Vic Callow

19 August 1992 2	Queens Park Rangers	3–1	Southampton	London
	Ferdinand 58', 86'; Bardsley 70'		Le Tissier 31'	Stadium: Loftus Road; Attendance: 10,925; Referee: Ray Bigger

22 August 1992 3	Aston Villa	1–1	Southampton	Birmingham
	Atkinson 64'		Adams 79'	Stadium: Villa Park; Attendance: 17,894; Referee: Kelvin Morton

24 August 1992 4	Southampton	0–1	Manchester United	Southampton
			Dublin 89'	Stadium: The Dell; Attendance: 15,623; Referee: Ray Lewis

29 August 1992 5	Southampton	2–1	Middlesbrough	Southampton
	Le Tissier 80' (pen.); Banger 83'		Wilkinson 75'	Stadium: The Dell; Attendance: 13,003; Referee: Rodger Gifford

1 September 1992 6	Liverpool	1–1	Southampton	Liverpool
	Wright 60'		Dixon 51'	Stadium: Anfield; Attendance: 30,024; Referee: Robbie Hart

5 September 1992 7	Norwich City	1–0	Southampton	Norwich
	Robins 87'			Stadium: Carrow Road; Attendance: 12,452; Referee: Keith Hackett

12 September 1992 8	Southampton	1–2	Queens Park Rangers	Southampton
	Le Tissier 11'		Sinton 53'; Channing 56'	Stadium: The Dell; Attendance: 14,125; Referee: Alan Gunn

19 September 1992 9	Southampton	1–1	Leeds United	Southampton
	Groves 43'		Speed 83'	Stadium: The Dell; Attendance: 16,229; Referee: Alf Buksh

26 September 1992 10	Crystal Palace	1–2	Southampton	London
	Young 54'		Dowie 44', 88'	Stadium: Selhurst Park; Attendance: 13,829; Referee: Jim Borrett

3 October 1992 11	Sheffield United	2–0	Southampton	Sheffield
	Whitehouse 4'; Littlejohn 26'			Stadium: Bramall Lane; Attendance: 15,842; Referee: Ken Redfern

17 October 1992 12	Southampton	2–2	Wimbledon	Southampton
	Dowie 57'; Groves 83'		Cotterill 50', 67'	Stadium: The Dell; Attendance: 11,221; Referee: Keren Barratt

24 October 1992 13	Manchester City	1–0	Southampton	Manchester
	Sheron 74'			Stadium: Maine Road; Attendance: 20,089; Referee: Philip Don

31 October 1992 14	Southampton	1–0	Oldham Athletic	Southampton
	Hall 58'			Stadium: The Dell; Attendance: 10,827; Referee: Paul Durkin

7 November 1992 15	Ipswich Town	0–0	Southampton	Ipswich
				Stadium: Portman Road; Attendance: 15,722; Referee: Roger Dilkes

22 November 1992 16	Southampton	1–1	Blackburn Rovers	Southampton
	Le Tissier 22'		Moran 38'	Stadium: The Dell; Attendance: 16,626; Referee: Martin Bodenham

28 November 1992 17	Nottingham Forest	1–2	Southampton	Nottingham
	Clough 43'		Le Tissier 21'; Adams 63'	Stadium: City Ground; Attendance: 19,942; Referee: David Elleray

5 December 1992 18	Southampton	2–0	Arsenal	Southampton
	Maddison 16'; Dowie 53'			Stadium: The Dell; Attendance: 17,286; Referee: John Key

12 December 1992 19	Southampton	2–2	Coventry City	Southampton
	Maddison 9'; Dowie 61'		Quinn 6', 25'	Stadium: The Dell; Attendance: 12,306; Referee: Bob Nixon

19 December 1992 20	Everton	2–1	Southampton	Liverpool
	Beardsley 11' (pen.); Rideout 36'		Le Tissier 5'	Stadium: Goodison Park; Attendance: 14,051; Referee: Mike Peck

26 December 1992 21	Chelsea	1–1	Southampton	London
	Newton 89'		Dowie 2'	Stadium: Stamford Bridge; Attendance: 18,344; Referee: Alan Gunn

28 December 1992 22	Southampton	1–2	Sheffield Wednesday	Southampton
	Monkou 80'		Sheridan 12' (pen.); Hirst 63'	Stadium: The Dell; Attendance: 17,426; Referee: Roger Milford

9 January 1993 23	Leeds United	2–1	Southampton	Leeds
	Fairclough 50'; Speed 72'		Dixon 19'	Stadium: Elland Road; Attendance: 26,071; Referee: Ron Groves

16 January 1993 24	Southampton	1–0	Crystal Palace	Southampton
	Maddison 50'			Stadium: The Dell; Attendance: 13,397; Referee: Philip Don

26 January 1993 25	Middlesbrough	2–1	Southampton	Middlesbrough
	Mohan 24'; Wilkinson 71'		Le Tissier 58'	Stadium: Ayresome Park; Attendance: 13,918; Referee: Peter Foakes

30 January 1993 26	Southampton	2–0	Aston Villa	Southampton
	Banger 39'; Dowie 63'			Stadium: The Dell; Attendance: 19,087; Referee: Philip Wright

7 February 1993 27	Tottenham Hotspur	4–2	Southampton	London
	Sheringham 54', 59'; Barmby 56'; Anderton 57'		Dowie 21'; Hall 66'	Stadium: White Hart Lane; Attendance: 20,098; Referee: Ken Redfern

10 February 1993 28	Southampton	3–0	Norwich City	Southampton
	Hall 9'; Adams 25'; Banger 79'			Stadium: The Dell; Attendance: 12,969; Referee: Joe Worrall

13 February 1993 29	Southampton	2–1	Liverpool	Southampton
	Maddison 23'; Banger 73'		Hutchison 60'	Stadium: The Dell; Attendance: 17,216; Referee: Alf Buksh

20 February 1993 30	Manchester United	2–1	Southampton	Manchester
	Giggs 82', 83'		Banger 77'	Stadium: Old Trafford; Attendance: 36,257; Referee: Ray Lewis

27 February 1993 31	Southampton	3–2	Sheffield United	Southampton
	Moore 2'; Kenna 5'; Dowie 39'		Gayle 37'; Bryson 83'	Stadium: The Dell; Attendance: 13,814; Referee: Jim Borrett

6 March 1993 32	Wimbledon	1–2	Southampton	London
	Holdsworth 22'		Le Tissier 33'; Moore 73'	Stadium: Selhurst Park; Attendance: 4,534; Referee: Alan Gunn

9 March 1993 33	Blackburn Rovers	0–0	Southampton	Blackburn
				Stadium: Ewood Park; Attendance: 13,556; Referee: Stephen Lodge

13 March 1993 34	Southampton	4–3	Ipswich Town	Southampton
	Hall 17'; Le Tissier 65' (pen.), 90'; Kenna 84'		Linighan 13'; Goddard 35'; Kiwomya 87'	Stadium: The Dell; Attendance: 15,428; Referee: David Elleray

20 March 1993 35	Arsenal	4–3	Southampton	London
	Linighan 15'; Merson 16'; Carter 20', 79'		Dowie 4'; Adams 30'; Le Tissier 50'	Stadium: Arsenal Stadium; Attendance: 24,149; Referee: Keren Barratt

24 March 1993 36	Southampton	1–2	Nottingham Forest	Southampton
	Le Tissier 72'		Clough 5'; Keane 45'	Stadium: The Dell; Attendance: 18,005; Referee: Mike Reed

3 April 1993 37	Coventry City	2–0	Southampton	Coventry
	Quinn 7' (pen.); Williams 80'			Stadium: Highfield Road; Attendance: 10,463; Referee: Keith Cooper

10 April 1993 38	Southampton	1–0	Chelsea	Southampton
	Banger 49'			Stadium: The Dell; Attendance: 15,135; Referee: Keith Burge

12 April 1993 39	Sheffield Wednesday	5–2	Southampton	Sheffield
	Bright 37'; Bart-Williams 43', 71', 80'; King 50'		Dodd 68'; Dowie 86'	Stadium: Hillsborough Stadium; Attendance: 26,183; Referee: Kelvin Morton

17 April 1993 40	Southampton	0–0	Everton	Southampton
				Stadium: The Dell; Attendance: 16,911; Referee: Martin Bodenham

1 May 1993 41	Southampton	0–1	Manchester City	Southampton
			White 41'	Stadium: The Dell; Attendance: 11,830; Referee: T. Lloyd

8 May 1993 42	Oldham Athletic	4–3	Southampton	Oldham
	Pointon 29'; Olney 44'; Ritchie 54'; Halle 63'		Le Tissier 34', 66', 84'	Stadium: Boundary Park; Attendance: 14,597; Referee: Howard King

=== Final league table ===
Pos	Team	Pld	W	D	L	GF	GA	GD	Pts	Qualification or relegation
16	Ipswich Town	42	12	16	14	50	55	−5	52	
17	Leeds United	42	12	15	15	57	62	−5	51	
18	Southampton	42	13	11	18	54	61	−7	50	
19	Oldham Athletic	42	13	10	19	63	74	−11	49	
20	Crystal Palace (R)	42	11	16	15	48	61	−13	49	Relegation to Football League First Division

Source: RSSSF
Rules for classification: 1) points; 2) goal difference; 3) number of goals scored.
(R) Relegated

=== Results by matchday ===
Round	1	2	3	4	5	6	7	8	9	10	11	12	13	14	15	16	17	18	19	20	21	22	23	24	25	26	27	28	29	30	31	32	33	34	35	36	37	38	39	40	41	42
Ground	H	A	A	H	H	A	A	H	H	A	A	H	A	H	A	H	A	H	H	A	A	H	A	H	A	H	A	H	H	A	H	A	A	H	A	H	A	H	A	H	H	A
Result	D	L	D	L	W	D	L	L	D	W	L	D	L	W	D	D	W	W	D	L	D	L	L	W	L	W	L	W	W	L	W	W	D	W	L	L	L	W	L	D	L	L
Position	13	17	17	20	17	17	18	19	20	15	18	18	19	19	19	17	16	13	15	16	15	17	19	17	17	15	17	14	12	14	12	11	11	9	10	13	14	14	14	14	15	18

Source: 11v11.com
A = Away; H = Home; W = Win; D = Draw; L = Loss

== FA Cup ==
Southampton entered the 1992–93 FA Cup in the third round against Nottingham Forest, another side fighting the risk of relegation from the FA Premier League. The visiting Saints opened the scoring in the 14th minute, when Matt Le Tissier headed in a corner from Micky Adams flicked on by Glenn Cockerill. Forest responded with a run of chances on goal, denied by Southampton goalkeeper Tim Flowers, before they eventually equalised a minute before half-time when Roy Keane headed in from a corner. During stoppage time before the break, the hosts went ahead through Neil Webb. In the second half, Le Tissier came close to equalising on multiple occasions, including hitting the crossbar just a minute after the break, while Kerry Dixon saw his "powerful header" saved by Forest goalkeeper Mark Crossley.

3 January 1993 Round 3	Nottingham Forest	2–1	Southampton	Nottingham
	Keane 44'; Webb 45+2'		Le Tissier 14'	Stadium: City Ground; Attendance: 13,592

== League Cup ==
Southampton entered the 1992–93 League Cup against Third Division side Gillingham. After a goalless first leg at Priestfield Stadium, the Saints overcame the fourth-flight side at home with a 3–0 win – Iain Dowie opened the scoring in the 29th minute with a header, before Matt Le Tissier added a penalty ten minutes after half-time, followed by a chip six minutes later. In the third round, the South Coast club hosted fellow FA Premier League side Crystal Palace, who won the tie 2–0 after a "dreadful" performance by the home side "lacking in passion and purpose".

23 September 1992 Round 2 Leg 1	Gillingham	0–0	Southampton	Gillingham
				Stadium: Priestfield Stadium; Attendance: 7,488

7 October 1992 Round 2 Leg 2	Southampton	3–0 (3–0 agg.)	Gillingham	Southampton
	Dowie 29'; Le Tissier 55' (pen.), 61'			Stadium: The Dell; Attendance: 6,764

28 October 1992 Round 3	Southampton	0–2	Crystal Palace	Southampton
			McGoldrick 10'; Salako 17'	Stadium: The Dell; Attendance: 9,060

== Other matches ==
Outside the league, FA Cup and League Cup, the Southampton first team played five additional matches during the 1992–93 season. The first was a friendly against a team representing Jersey in September 1992, which the Saints won 4–1 (goals included a pair from Nicky Banger). A similar friendly against a team representing Guernsey was played in March 1993, which was also won by Southampton 3–1 (Matt Le Tissier scored twice). The next month, before the last two games of the season, the club played friendlies against Fordingbridge Turks and Grimsby Town. The former was hosted to mark the Turks' 125th anniversary and saw the Saints thrash the non-league side 13–1; Le Tissier scored a hat-trick and later played in goal, with Tim Flowers scoring a "spectacular diving header" during an outfield spell. Seven other players were on the scoresheet. The latter, just over a week later, was a testimonial for retiring player John Cockerill, brother of Saints player Glenn, which saw the FA Premier League side beat the First Division hosts 3–1. The last friendly, which took place in between the penultimate and final games in the league, saw Southampton beat local Second Division side Bournemouth 2–0 at Dean Court for Paul Morrell's testimonial.

15 September 1992 Friendly	Jersey Select XI	1–4	Southampton	St Helier, Jersey
			Banger; Hurlock; Le Tissier	Stadium: Springfield Stadium

15 March 1993 Friendly	Guernsey FA XI	1–3	Southampton	Saint Sampson, Guernsey
			Le Tissier; Maddison	Stadium: Corbet Field

19 April 1993 Friendly	Fordingbridge Turks	1–13	Southampton	Fordingbridge
			Banger; Benali; Cockerill; Dowie; Flowers; Le Tissier; Maddison; Tisdale; Widdrington	Stadium: Recreation Ground

27 April 1993 John Cockerill Testimonial	Grimsby Town	1–3	Southampton	Cleethorpes
			Le Tissier; Maddison	Stadium: Blundell Park

4 May 1993 Paul Morrell Testimonial	Bournemouth	0–2	Southampton	Bournemouth
			Maddison	Stadium: Dean Court

== Player details ==
Southampton used 25 players during the 1992–93 season, 12 of whom scored during the campaign. Six players made their debut appearances for the club, including five of their seven new signings (Derek Allan, Kerry Dixon, Perry Groves, Ken Monkou, and David Speedie) and one player making the step up from youth to the first team (Neal Bartlett). Four of these new signings (Allan, Dixon, Groves, and Speedie) also made their last appearances for the Saints during the campaign, as did striker David Lee, who left the following summer. Goalkeeper Tim Flowers was the only Southampton player to appear in all 46 of the team's matches across all competitions. Matt Le Tissier finished as the club's top scorer in 1992–93 with 15 goals in the league, one in the FA Cup and two in the League Cup; Iain Dowie was the second-highest scorer with 12 goals in all competitions. Flowers won the Southampton F.C. Player of the Season award for a second time (the second player, after fellow goalkeeper Peter Shilton, to do so).

=== Squad statistics ===
Name	Pos.	Nat.	League		FA Cup		League Cup		Total		Discipline	
Name	Pos.	Nat.	Apps.	Goals	Apps.	Goals	Apps.	Goals	Apps.	Goals	Yellow card	Red card
Micky Adams	DF	(England)	38	4	1	0	3	0	42	4	6	1
Derek Allan	DF	(Scotland)	0(1)	0	0	0	0	0	0(1)	0	0	0
Ian Andrews	GK	(England)	0	0	0	0	0	0	0	0	0	0
Nicky Banger	FW	(England)	10(17)	6	0(1)	0	1	0	11(18)	6	0	0
Neal Bartlett	MF	(England)	0(1)	0	0	0	0	0	0(1)	0	0	0
Francis Benali	DF	(England)	31(2)	0	1	0	1(2)	0	33(4)	0	5	1
Frankie Bennett	FW	(England)	0	0	0	0	0	0	0	0	0	0
Matthew Bound	DF	(Wales)	1(2)	0	0	0	0	0	1(2)	0	0	0
Glenn Cockerill	MF	(England)	21(2)	0	1	0	2	0	24(2)	0	2	0
Jason Dodd	DF	(England)	27(3)	1	1	0	3	0	31(3)	1	1	0
Iain Dowie	FW	(Northern Ireland)	34(2)	11	0	0	2	1	36(2)	12	9	0
Tim Flowers	GK	(England)	42	0	1	0	3	0	46	0	1	0
Perry Groves	FW	(England)	13(2)	2	0(1)	0	2	0	15(3)	2	2	0
Richard Hall	DF	(England)	28	4	1	0	1	0	30	4	5	0
David Hughes	MF	(England)	0	0	0	0	0	0	0	0	0	0
Terry Hurlock	MF	(England)	30	0	0	0	3	0	33	0	6	1
Jeff Kenna	DF	(Republic of Ireland)	27(2)	2	1	0	0	0	28(2)	2	0	0
Matt Le Tissier	MF	(England)	40	15	1	1	3	2	44	18	5	0
Neil Maddison	MF	(England)	33(4)	4	1	0	1	0	35(4)	4	0	0
Ken Monkou	DF	(Netherlands)	33	1	1	0	3	0	37	1	4	0
Paul Moody	FW	(England)	2(1)	0	0	0	0	0	2(1)	0	1	0
Kevin Moore	DF	(England)	18	2	0	0	1	0	19	2	3	0
Lee Powell	MF	(Wales)	0(2)	0	0	0	0	0	0(2)	0	0	0
Paul Sheerin	MF	(Scotland)	0	0	0	0	0	0	0	0	0	0
Martin Thomas	MF	(England)	0	0	0	0	0	0	0	0	0	0
Tommy Widdrington	MF	(England)	11(1)	0	0	0	0(1)	0	11(2)	0	3	0
Steve Wood	DF	(England)	4	0	0	0	1	0	5	0	0	0
Squad members who ended the season out on loan
Kerry Dixon	FW	(England)	8(1)	2	1	0	2	0	11(1)	2	0	0
David Speedie	FW	(Scotland)	11	0	0	0	1	0	12	0	1	0
Players with appearances who left before the end of the season
David Lee	FW	(England)	0(1)	0	0	0	0	0	0(1)	0	0	0

=== Most appearances ===
Rank	Name	Pos.	League		FA Cup		League Cup		Total		
Rank	Name	Pos.	Starts	Subs	Starts	Subs	Starts	Subs	Starts	Subs	Total
1	Tim Flowers	GK	42	0	1	0	3	0	46	0	46
2	Matt Le Tissier	MF	40	0	1	0	3	0	44	0	44
3	Micky Adams	DF	38	0	1	0	3	0	42	0	42
4	Neil Maddison	MF	33	4	1	0	1	0	35	4	39
5	Iain Dowie	FW	34	2	0	0	2	0	36	2	38
6	Ken Monkou	DF	33	0	1	0	3	0	37	0	37
6	Francis Benali	DF	31	2	1	0	1	2	33	4	37
8	Jason Dodd	DF	27	3	1	0	3	0	31	3	34
9	Terry Hurlock	MF	30	0	0	0	3	0	33	0	33
10	Richard Hall	DF	28	0	1	0	1	0	30	0	30
10	Jeff Kenna	DF	27	2	1	0	0	0	28	2	30

=== Top goalscorers ===
Rank	Name	Pos.	League		FA Cup		League Cup		Total		
Rank	Name	Pos.	Goals	Apps	Goals	Apps	Goals	Apps	Goals	Apps	GPG
1	Matt Le Tissier	FW	15	40	1	1	2	3	18	44	0.40
2	Iain Dowie	FW	11	36	0	0	1	2	12	38	0.31
3	Nicky Banger	FW	6	27	0	1	0	1	6	29	0.20
4	Richard Hall	DF	4	28	0	1	0	1	4	30	0.13
4	Neil Maddison	MF	4	37	0	1	0	1	4	39	0.10
4	Micky Adams	DF	4	38	0	1	0	3	4	42	0.09
7	Kerry Dixon	FW	2	9	0	1	0	2	2	12	0.16
7	Perry Groves	FW	2	15	0	1	0	2	2	18	0.11
7	Kevin Moore	DF	2	18	0	0	0	1	2	19	0.10
7	Jeff Kenna	DF	2	29	0	1	0	0	2	30	0.06

== Bibliography ==
- Holley, Duncan; Chalk, Gary (2003), Bull, David (ed.), In That Number: A Post-War Chronicle of Southampton FC, Bristol, England: Hagiology Publishing, ISBN 0-9534474-3-X
