= Spiken =

Locality in Sweden

Coordinates: 58°41′N 13°13′E

Spiken is a locality situated in Lidköping Municipality, Västra Götaland County, Sweden. A small fishing village, it consisted mostly of old boathouses until the 1980s when more modern harbor amenities were constructed.

The leading guide to restaurants and hotels in Sweden, the White Guide, has reviewed the local seafood specialist restaurant "Sjöboden".

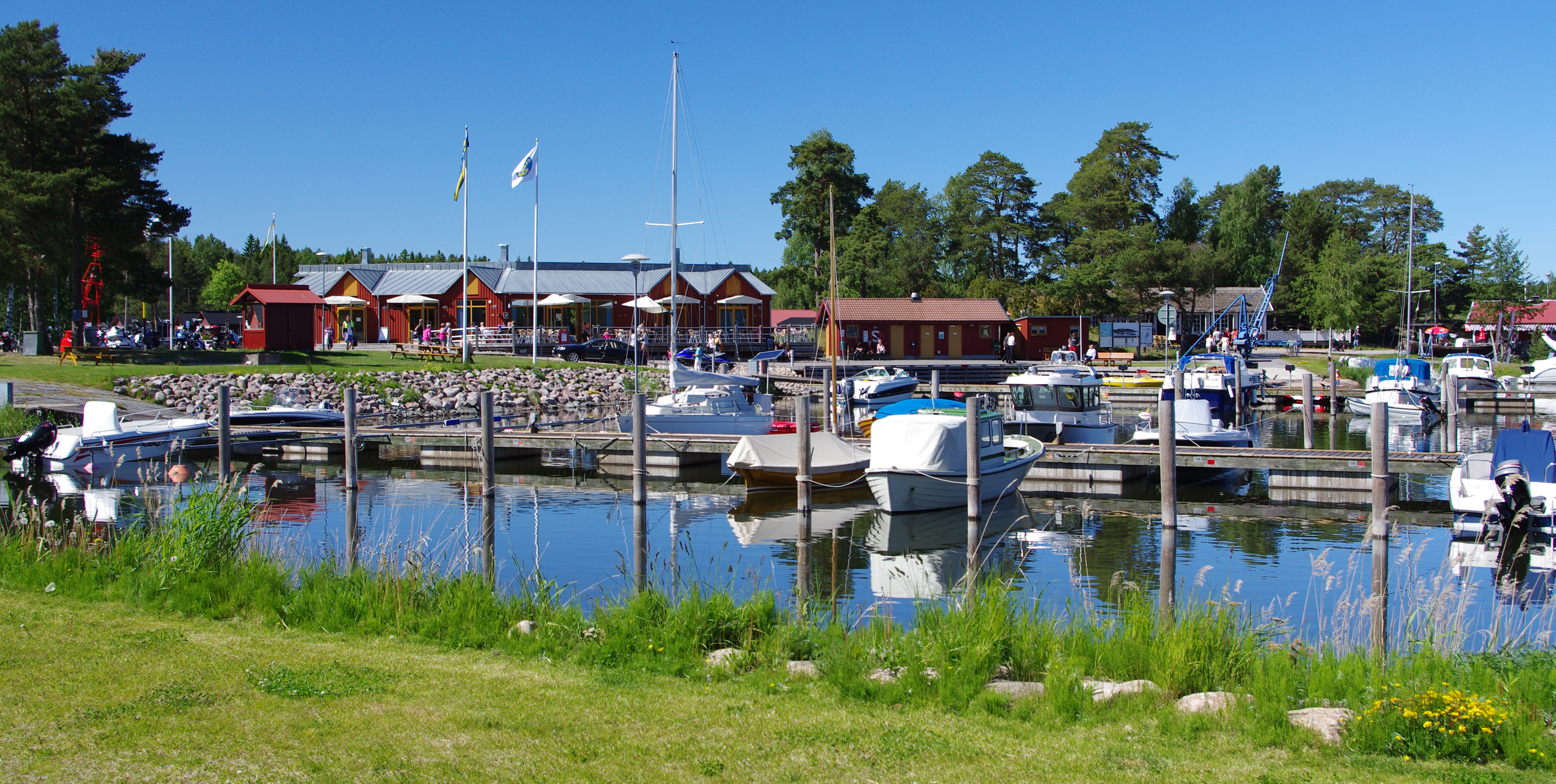
