= Derek Allan =

Scottish footballer (born 1974)

Personal information
- Full name: Derek Thomas Allan
- Date of birth: 24 December 1974 (age 51)
- Place of birth: Irvine, Scotland
- Height: 6 ft 0 in (1.83 m)
- Position: Defender

Team information
- Current team: Greenock Morton (U17 coach)

Senior career*
Years	Team	Apps	(Gls)
1992–1993	Ayr United	5	(0)
1993–1996	Southampton	1	(0)
1996	→ Brighton & Hove Albion (loan)	8	(0)
1996–1999	Brighton & Hove Albion	72	(2)
1999–2001	Kingstonian	60	(4)
2001–2004	Queen of the South	47	(0)
2004–2005	Dumbarton	6	(0)
Total		199	(6)
- * Club domestic league appearances and goals

Derek Thomas Allan (born 24 December 1974) is a Scottish former football defender.

He is currently the coach of Greenock Morton's U17 side.

== Playing career ==
Allan or ("Swan Neck") (Due to his aerial ability) was born in Irvine, Scotland and started his professional career at Ayr United, where he made only five appearances. After just one year at the club he was sold to Southampton of the English Premiership for a fee of £75,000 in March 1993. He also was part of the Scottish Under 21 squad in April 1993 which played Iceland at Rugby Park, Kilmarnock.

Southampton's manager Ian Branfoot saw Allan as "one for the future" but a series of injuries restricted him to just one Premier League appearance when he came on as a late substitute for Matthew Bound in a 1–0 defeat at home to Manchester City on 1 May 1993.

In March 1996 Jimmy Case took him on loan to Brighton & Hove Albion, before making the move permanent. In the three years he spent at Brighton he made 67 league appearances, scoring twice. Allan joined non-league side Kingstonian and was player of the year in the 1999–00 season. Allan had a successful spell at Kingsmeadow, being part of the winning 2000 FA Trophy squad beating Kettering Town 3-2 in a dramatic 2000 Wembley Final, which turned out to be one of the last games ever played at the 'Old Wembley'. 68 appearances in 2 seasons

In July 2001 he was signed by Scottish side Queen of the South where he won the Scottish Second Division Title in May 2002. His stay was again hampered by injuries and he was limited to just 47 league appearances. Allan spent the last season of his career at Dumbarton, before early retirement at the age of just 30.

Derek is now the Elite Youth Coach at Greenock Morton Under 17s and a fully UEFA Qualified 'A' licence Youth Coach.

== Career statistics ==
Appearances and goals by club, season and competition
Club	Season	League			FA Cup		League Cup		Other		Total	
Club	Season	Division	Apps	Goals	Apps	Goals	Apps	Goals	Apps	Goals	Apps	Goals
Ayr United	1992–93	Scottish First Division	5	0	0	0	0	0	—		5	0
Southampton
Southampton	1992–93	Premier League	1	0	0	0	0	0	—		1	0
Southampton	1993–94	Premier League	0	0	0	0	0	0	—		0	0
Southampton	1994–95	Premier League	0	0	0	0	0	0	—		0	0
Southampton	Total		1	0	0	0	0	0	0	0	1	0
Brighton & Hove Albion (loan)	1995–96	Second Division	8	0	0	0	0	0	—		8	0
Brighton & Hove Albion
Brighton & Hove Albion	1996–97	Third Division	31	0	0	0	2	0	1 (Note: Appearances in EFL Trophy)	0	34	0
Brighton & Hove Albion	1997–98	Third Division	19	1	1	0	0	0	1	0	21	1
Brighton & Hove Albion	1998–99	Third Division	22	1	0	0	1	0	1	0	24	1
Brighton & Hove Albion	Total		80	2	1	0	3	0	3	0	87	2
Kingstonian
Kingstonian	1999–2000	Football Conference	29	1	1	0	—		6 (Note: Appearances in FA Trophy (2 appearances) and Conference Cup (4 appearances))	0	36	1
Kingstonian	2000–01	Football Conference	31	3	5	0	—		2 (Note: Appearances in Conference Cup)	0	38	3
Kingstonian	Total		60	4	6	0	0	0	8	0	74	4
Queen of the South
Queen of the South	2001–02	Scottish Second Division	13	0	2 (Note: Scottish Cup)	0	1 (Note: Scottish League Cup)	0	—		16	0
Queen of the South	2002–03	Scottish First Division	18	0	0	0	1	0	—		19	0
Queen of the South	2003–04	Scottish First Division	16	0	0	0	1	0	—		17	0
Queen of the South	Total		47	0	2	0	3	0	0	0	52	0
Dumbarton	2004–05	Scottish Second Division	6	0	0	0	0	0	1 (Note: Appearances in Scottish Challenge Cup)	0	7	0
Career total			199	6	9	0	6	0	12	0	226	6

== Honours ==
=== Club ===
Kingstonian

- FA Trophy: 1999-20

Queen Of The South

- Scottish Second Division: 2001-02
