= Filsbäck =

- Location within Västra Götaland Location within Sweden
- Coordinates: 58°29′30″N 13°14′50″E
- Country: Sweden
- Province: Västergötland
- County: Västra Götaland County
- Municipality: Lidköping Municipality

Area
  - Total: 0.53 km^{2} (0.20 sq mi)

Population (31 December 2010)
  - Total: 615
  - Density: 1,167/km^{2} (3,020/sq mi)
- Time zone: UTC+1 (CET)
  - Summer (DST): UTC+2 (CEST)
- Climate: Dfb

Filsbäck (Swedish pronunciation: [ˈfɪ̌lːsbɛk]) is a locality situated in Lidköping Municipality, Västra Götaland County, Sweden. It had 615 inhabitants in 2010.
