= Saleby, Sweden =

Saleby
- Location within Västra Götaland Location within Sweden
- Coordinates: 58°23′N 13°08′E
- Country: Sweden
- Province: Västergötland
- County: Västra Götaland County
- Municipality: Lidköping Municipality

Area
  - Total: 0.48 km^{2} (0.19 sq mi)

Population (31 December 2010)
  - Total: 232
  - Density: 484/km^{2} (1,250/sq mi)
- Time zone: UTC+1 (CET)
  - Summer (DST): UTC+2 (CEST)
- Climate: Cfb

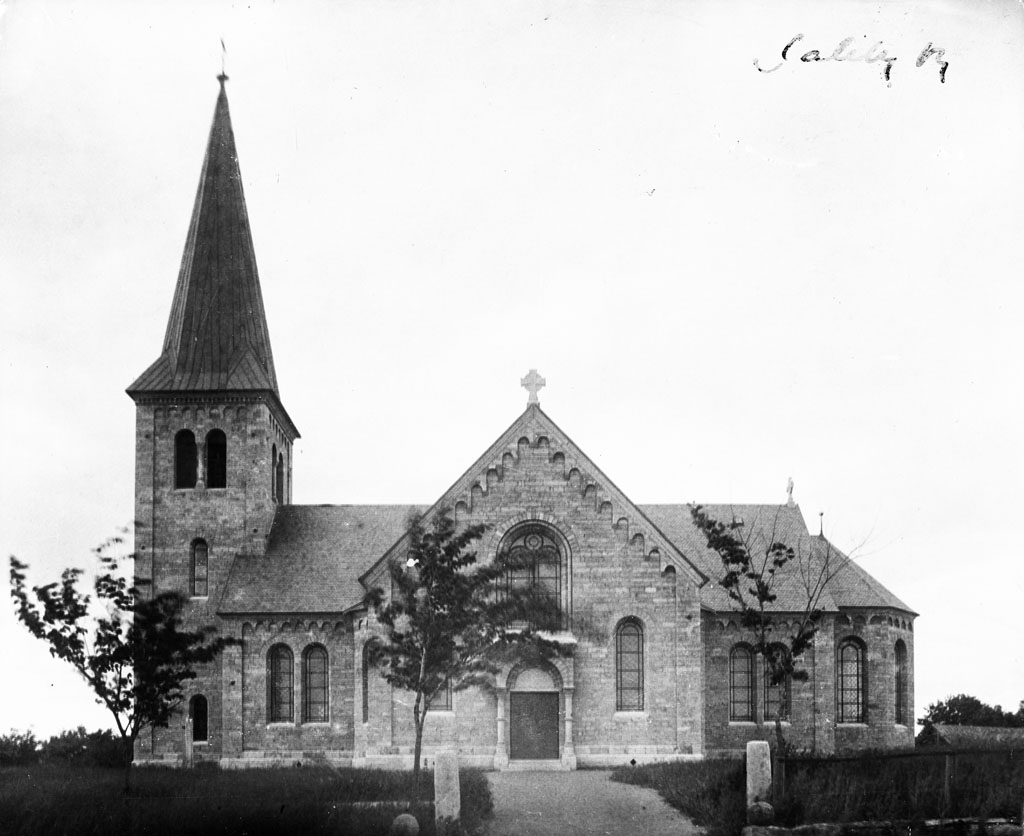
Saleby Church, built in 1893-1894 in Romanesque style. Parish (socken) Saleby Province (landskap) Västergötland Municipality (kommun) Lidköping

Saleby is a locality situated in Lidköping Municipality, Västra Götaland County, Sweden. It had 232 inhabitants in 2010.
