= Tun, Sweden =

Tun
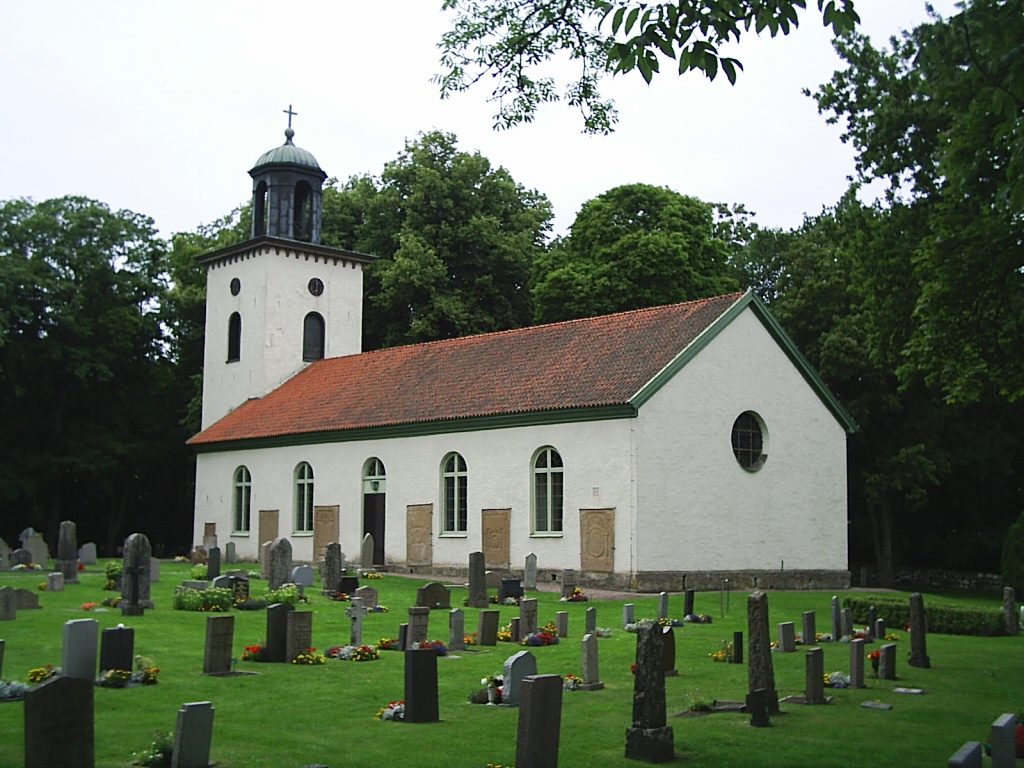
- Tun church

- Location within Västra Götaland Location within Sweden
- Coordinates: 58°26′N 12°44′E
- Country: Sweden
- Province: Västergötland
- County: Västra Götaland County
- Municipality: Lidköping Municipality

Area
  - Total: 0.38 km^{2} (0.15 sq mi)

Population (31 December 2010)
  - Total: 206
  - Density: 542/km^{2} (1,400/sq mi)
- Time zone: UTC+1 (CET)
  - Summer (DST): UTC+2 (CEST)

Tun is a locality situated in Lidköping Municipality, Västra Götaland County, Sweden. It had 206 inhabitants in 2010.
