= Richard Hall (footballer) =

English footballer and coach

Personal information
- Full name: Richard Anthony Hall
- Date of birth: 14 March 1972 (age 54)
- Place of birth: Ipswich, England
- Height: 1.88 m (6 ft 2 in)
- Position: Defender

Team information
- Current team: Colchester United (U23s Lead Coach)

Youth career
- 1987–1988: Ipswich Town
- 1988–1989: Scunthorpe United

Senior career*
Years	Team	Apps	(Gls)
1989–1991	Scunthorpe United	22	(3)
1991–1996	Southampton	126	(12)
1996–1999	West Ham United	7	(0)
Total		155	(15)

International career
1992–1993	England U21	11	(2)

Managerial career
- 2015: Colchester United (caretaker)
- * Club domestic league appearances and goals

Richard Anthony Hall (born 14 March 1972) is an English football coach and former professional footballer, who is an under-23s coach at Colchester United.

As a player, he was defender who played in the Premier League for both Southampton and West Ham United, having previously played in the Football League with Scunthorpe United. He made over 30 appearances for Scunthorpe before being signed by Southampton for £200,000 in February 1991. After five years with the south-coast club and over 120 league appearances, Hall earned a £1.4 million move to West Ham in the summer of 1996. He made just eight appearances for the club before he was forced to retire from injury in 1999. While with Southampton, Hall made eleven appearances for England at under-21 level.

Hall has served as caretaker manager of Colchester United, having previously been assistant to Tony Humes. He has also served as a professional development coach for the club, and prior to joining Colchester, he was under-18 coach for his hometown club Ipswich Town.

== Club career ==
Born in Ipswich, Hall attended Kesgrave High School and was a member of the Ipswich Town youth team. He failed to make an appearance for the first-team, instead moving to Scunthorpe United. Hall spent two years as an apprentice at the club, and a further six months as a professional after signing his first contract. Between 1988 and 1991, Hall made 31 appearances in all competitions, scoring three goals, before earning a £200,000 move to Southampton on 13 February 1991.

Hall made his debut for Southampton on the final day of the 1990–91 season on 11 May 1991 as a substitute for Neil Ruddock in a First Division 1–1 draw. In his five years with the club, Hall made 126 league appearances, scoring 12 goals. He also made 30 cup appearances, scoring a further four goals.

Harry Redknapp signed Hall from Southampton for his West Ham United side in the summer of 1996 for a £1.4 million fee. An injury in pre-season delayed Hall's preparations for the 1996–97 season, eventually making his first-team debut on 9 April 1997 in a 0–0 Premier League draw with Middlesbrough at the Boleyn Ground. He made six further appearances until the end of the season. The following two seasons were blighted by injury, and he made his final appearance for West Ham on 13 January 1999 in a 1–0 away defeat to Swansea City in the FA Cup, coming on as a substitute for Tim Breacker, before retiring in April 1999 at the age of 27.

== International career ==
Hall made his debut for England at under-21 level as a substitute for goalscorer Andy Cole in England's 2–2 draw with Hungary on 12 May 1992 in Vác. He made his first start for Lawrie McMenemy's side on 28 May in England's Toulon Tournament draw with France. He scored his first under-21 goal on 16 February 1993 in his third appearance for the side in a 6–0 win over San Marino at Luton Town's Kenilworth Road stadium in a 1994 European Under-21 Championship qualifier. He also started in a qualifying draw with Turkey on 30 March and in a 3–0 win over the Netherlands on 27 April, before he scored his second and final under-21 goal on 28 May 1993, one year to the day since his first start for the side. He scored in the Young Lions' 4–1 win away in Poland.

Hall made further appearances in England's successful 1993 Toulon Tournament side, starting in a 2–0 win over Portugal and draws against Czech Republic and Brazil in the group stages. He also played in their semi-final 1–0 win over Scotland on 13 June, before playing in the 1–0 final victory over France, which was to be his eleventh and final appearance for the side.

He was also called up to Terry Venables' get-together England squad in April 1995, but ultimately was never capped for the senior side.

== Coaching career ==
Following his retirement from playing, Hall joined his former club Ipswich Town as a part-time member of the coaching staff in 2001. He was named as a full-time first-team coach in July 2006, alongside his academy role. After a restructuring of the academy in March 2009, Hall was made redundant by Ipswich following academy manager Tony Humes out of the club.

Both Humes and Hall joined Colchester United's Academy after leaving Ipswich in 2009. Ahead of the 2010–11 season, Hall was put in charge of the Colchester United reserve team while retaining his first-team and youth-team coaching roles.

With Tony Humes named as Colchester United manager following Joe Dunne's exit on 1 September 2014, Hall was announced as Humes' assistant manager.

Hall was named as caretaker manager at Colchester United alongside John McGreal following Tony Humes dismissal as manager on 26 November 2015. However, following a 5–1 defeat against Burton Albion in his only match in charge, he was replaced by Colchester's under-18s coach Wayne Brown, who was named caretaker manager on 2 December. Despite this change, Hall remained with the club, taking up a one-to-one coaching role within the academy.

== Career statistics ==
=== Club ===
Appearances and goals by club, season and competition
Club	Season	League			FA Cup		League Cup		Other		Total	
Club	Season	Division	Apps	Goals	Apps	Goals	Apps	Goals	Apps	Goals	Apps	Goals
Scunthorpe United
Scunthorpe United	1989–90	Fourth Division	1	0	0	0	0	0	0	0	1	0
Scunthorpe United	1990–91	Fourth Division	21	3	3	0	2	0	4 (Note: Appearances in EFL Trophy)	0	30	3
Scunthorpe United	Total		22	3	3	0	2	0	4	0	31	3
Southampton
Southampton	1990–91	First Division	1	0	0	0	0	0	—		1	0
Southampton	1991–92	First Division	26	3	5	2	4	0	3 (Note: Appearances in Full Members' Cup)	0	38	5
Southampton	1992–93	Premier League	28	4	1	0	1	0	—		30	4
Southampton	1993–94	Premier League	4	0	0	0	1	0	—		5	0
Southampton	1994–95	Premier League	37	4	4	0	2	0	—		43	4
Southampton	1995–96	Premier League	30	1	5	1	4	1	—		39	3
Southampton	Total		126	12	15	3	12	1	3	0	156	16
West Ham United
West Ham United	1996–97	Premier League	7	0	0	0	0	0	—		7	0
West Ham United	1997–98	Premier League	0	0	0	0	0	0	—		0	0
West Ham United	1998–99	Premier League	0	0	1	0	0	0	—		1	0
West Ham United	Total		7	0	1	0	0	0	0	0	8	0
Career total			155	15	19	3	14	1	7	0	195	19

=== Managerial ===
As of 2 December 2015

Managerial record by team and tenure
Team	From	To	Record				
Team	From	To	P	W	D	L	Win %
Colchester United (caretaker)	26 November 2015	2 December 2015	1	0	0	1	0.0
Total			1	0	0	1	0.0

== Honours ==
England U21

- 1993 Toulon Tournament winner
