= Örslösa =

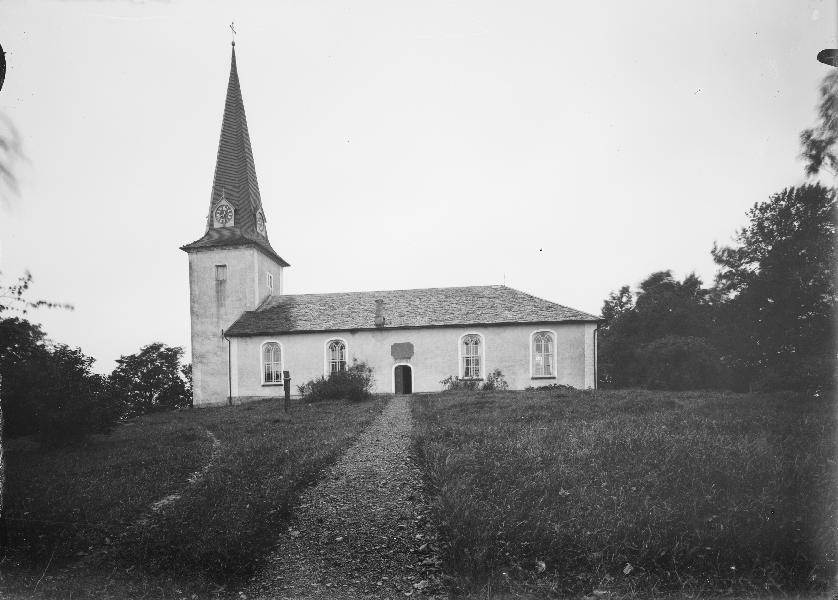
- Örslösa Church

- Location within Västra Götaland Location within Sweden
- Coordinates: 58°30′N 13°00′E
- Country: Sweden
- Province: Västergötland
- County: Västra Götaland County
- Municipality: Lidköping Municipality

Area
  - Total: 0.41 km^{2} (0.16 sq mi)

Population (31 December 2010)
  - Total: 307
  - Density: 753/km^{2} (1,950/sq mi)
- Time zone: UTC+1 (CET)
  - Summer (DST): UTC+2 (CEST)
- Climate: Dfb

Örslösa is a locality situated in Lidköping Municipality, Västra Götaland County, Sweden. It had 307 inhabitants in 2010.
