= Robert Walker (footballer, born 1982) =

Scottish footballer

Personal information
- Date of birth: 16 June 1982 (age 44)
- Place of birth: Glasgow, Scotland
- Position: Defender

Team information
- Current team: Arthurlie

Senior career*
Years	Team	Apps	(Gls)
- Maryhill
2004–05	Hamilton Academical	30	(3)
2005–06	Dumbarton	38	(1)
2006–07	Stranraer	19	(0)
2007–09	Albion Rovers	51	(0)
2009–10	Queen's Park	17	(0)
2010–	Arthurlie		
- * Club domestic league appearances and goals as of 15 May 2011

Robert Walker (born 16 June 1982, in Glasgow) is a Scottish footballer who played as a defender, for junior side Arthurlie.

== Career ==
Walker started his senior career with South Lanarkshire club Hamilton Academical after signing from Glasgow junior side Maryhill, before playing one season for both Dumbarton and Stranraer.

After leaving the Stair Park side, Walker played at Cliftonhill with Albion Rovers for two seasons before going amateur with Queen's Park in 2009.

Walker was released by Queen's Park at the end of the 2009-10 season.

After his release, Walker signed for Barrhead side Arthurlie.
