= Vinninga =

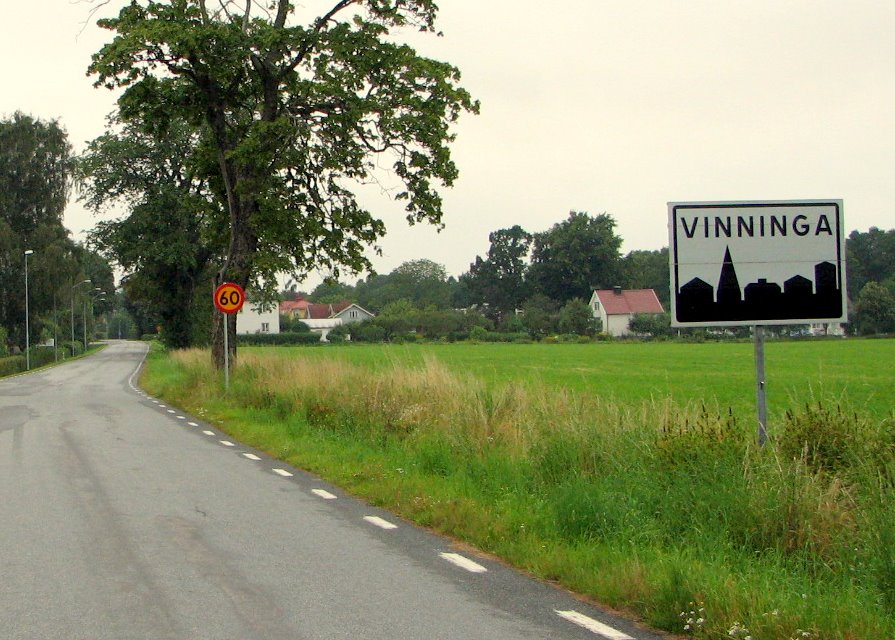

- Location within Västra Götaland Location within Sweden
- Coordinates: 58°27′N 13°16′E
- Country: Sweden
- Province: Västergötland
- County: Västra Götaland County
- Municipality: Lidköping Municipality

Area
  - Total: 0.86 km^{2} (0.33 sq mi)

Population (31 December 2010)
  - Total: 1,078
  - Density: 1,251/km^{2} (3,240/sq mi)
- Time zone: UTC+1 (CET)
  - Summer (DST): UTC+2 (CEST)
- Climate: Dfb

Vinninga is a locality situated in Lidköping Municipality, Västra Götaland County, Sweden. It had 1,078 inhabitants in 2010.
