= Chris McGroarty =

Scottish footballer

Personal information
- Full name: Christopher McGroarty
- Date of birth: 6 February 1981 (age 45)
- Place of birth: Bellshill, Scotland
- Position: Midfielder

Team information
- Current team: Kilsyth Rangers (manager)

Senior career*
Years	Team	Apps	(Gls)
1998–2004	Dunfermline Athletic	91	(1)
2003	→ Clyde (loan)	12	(0)
2004	St Mirren	12	(0)
2004–2005	Dumbarton	6	(0)
2005	East Stirlingshire	12	(2)
2005–2006	Berwick Rangers	33	(5)
2006–2007	Stranraer	9	(0)
2007–2008	Berwick Rangers	29	(0)
2008–2009	Stenhousemuir	25	(0)
2009	Brechin City	2	(0)
2009–2010	Forfar Athletic	1	(0)
2010–2011	Glenrothes		
2011–2014	Forth Wanderers		
2014–	Wishaw Juniors		

Managerial career
- 2013–2014: Forth Wanderers
- 2014–2017: Wishaw Juniors
- 2017–: Kilsyth Rangers
- * Club domestic league appearances and goals as of 10:02, 21 February 2018 (UTC)

Chris McGroarty (born 6 February 1981 in Bellshill) is a Scottish professional footballer who is currently player-manager of Scottish Junior Football Association, West Region side Kilsyth Rangers. He has previously played in the Scottish Premier League for Dunfermline Athletic.

== Career ==
McGroarty began his career with Scottish Premier League side Dunfermline Athletic, making his first team debut in the 1998–99 season. His form earned a call up to the Scotland Under 21 side in 2001 but he was never capped. He was loaned out to Glasgow side Clyde in 2003 before moving to Paisley club St Mirren one month later. At the end of the 2003–04 season, McGroarty was released by St Mirren and was signed by Scottish Second Division side Dumbarton. After only 4 games with Dumbarton, McGroarty was signed by East Stirlingshire on a short-term contract.

At the end of McGroarty's contract with East Stirlingshire, he signed for Berwick Rangers and played 33 matches for them in the 2005–06 season, scoring five goals. He attracted attention from Stranraer and was signed at the start of the 2006–07 season, only to re-join Berwick in January of that season where he played five games. In May 2008, McGroaty was released from his contract with The Wee Gers He subsequently signed for Scottish Third Division side Stenhousemuir a few days later, by doing that he became the first player that manager John Coughlin has signed during his time at three clubs.

McGroarty in July 2009 signed a short-term contract for Second Division side Brechin City before joining Forfar Athletic in October the same year. He then signed for Junior side Glenrothes in 2010, before moving to Forth Wanderers in 2011.

== Management ==
McGroarty was appointed as manager of Forth in May 2013. He joined Wishaw Juniors as manager in October 2014, then moved on to Kilsyth Rangers in August 2017.
