= Lidköping Municipality =

Lidköping Municipality Lidköpings kommun
- Municipality
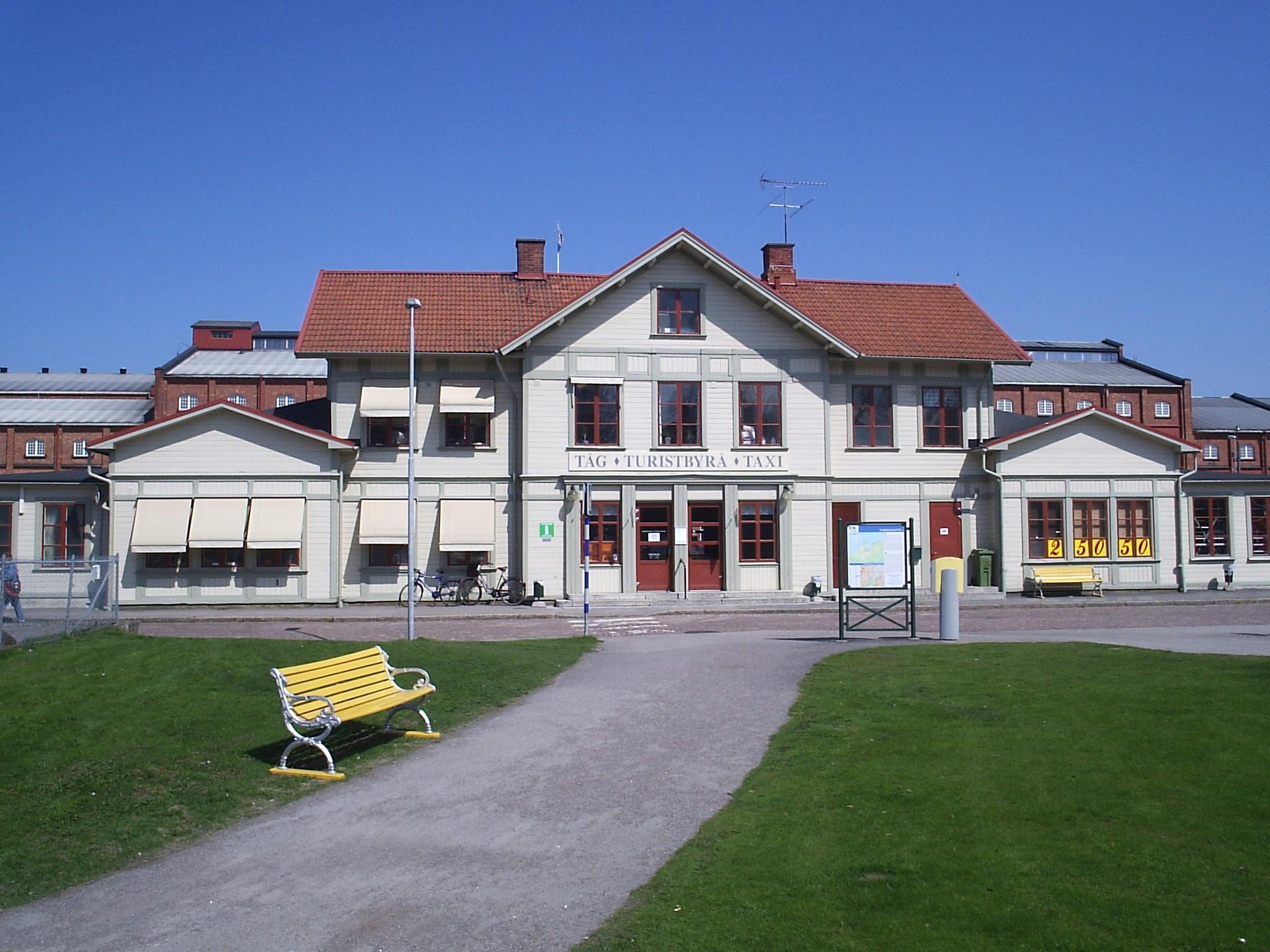
- Lidköping Railway Station

- Coat of arms

- Coordinates: 58°30′N 13°11′E
- Country: Sweden
- County: Västra Götaland County
- Seat: Lidköping

Area
  - Total: 1,372.605625 km^{2} (529.965995 sq mi)
  - Land: 695.605625 km^{2} (268.574833 sq mi)
  - Water: 677 km^{2} (261 sq mi)
- Area as of 1 January 2014.

Population (30 June 2025)
  - Total: 40,489
  - Density: 58.207/km^{2} (150.76/sq mi)
- Time zone: UTC+1 (CET)
  - Summer (DST): UTC+2 (CEST)
- ISO 3166 code: SE
- Province: Västergötland
- Municipal code: 1494
- Website: www.lidkoping.se

Lidköping Municipality (Swedish: Lidköpings kommun) is a municipality in Västra Götaland County in western Sweden. Its seat is located in the city of Lidköping.

Lidköping sometimes refers to itself as "Lidköping by Vänern", possibly to distinguish itself from the namewise (and historically) similar city of Linköping in eastern Sweden.

== Geography ==
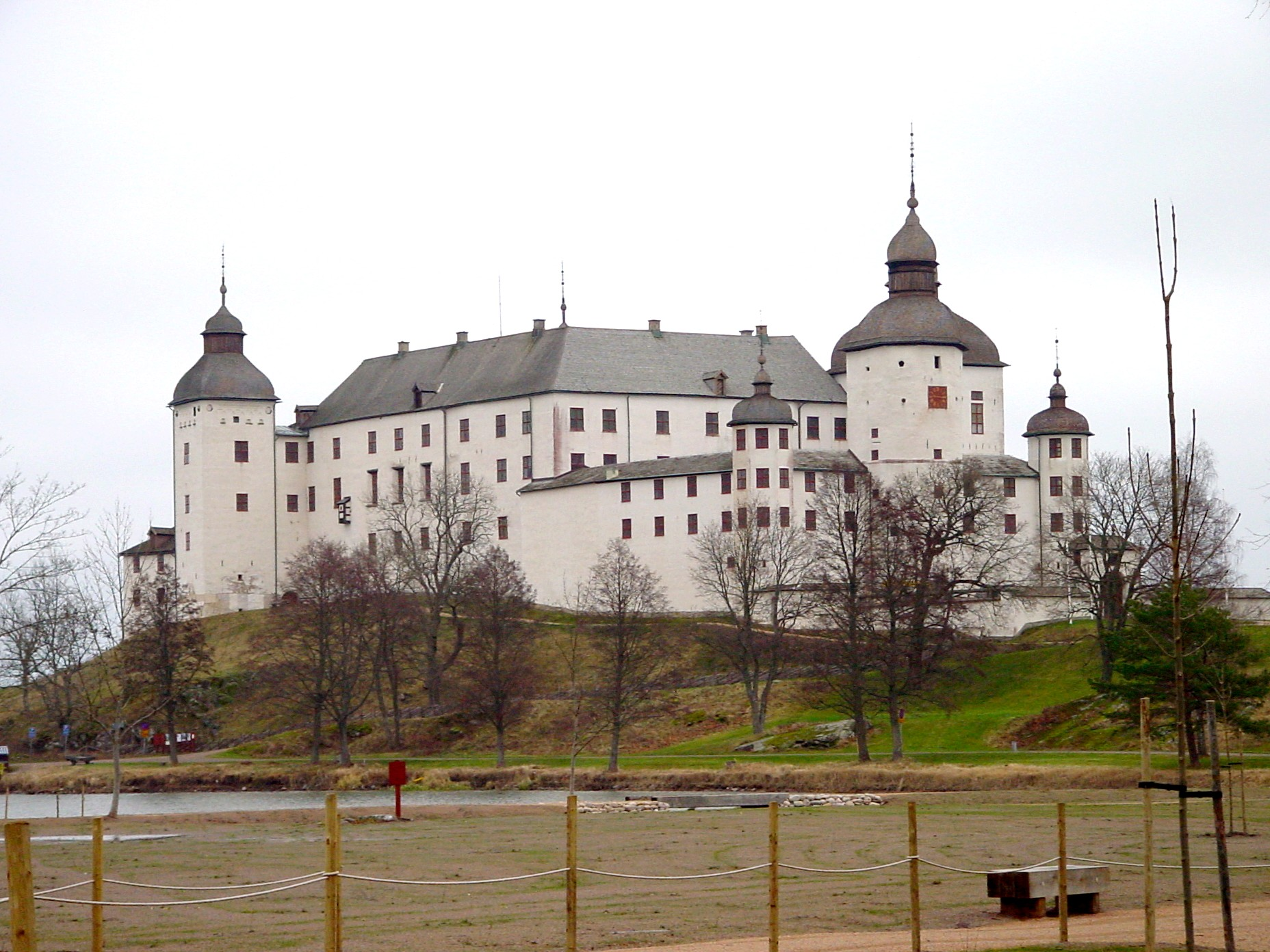
Läckö Castle

Lidköping Municipality is, together with its western neighbor Götene, located on the Läckö-Kinnekulla peninsula. There are several Vänern islands that belong to the municipality. One of them is Läckö, where the Läckö Castle is a notable sight.

== Localities ==
Population numbers of the towns and villages, from SCB, December 31 of noted year.

Year	2002	2003	2004	2005	2010
Lidköping	24,679	24,885	24,960	24,941	25,644
Vinninga	1,079	1,060	1,054	1,064	1,078
Järpås	865	868	876	808	795
Filsbäck	656	656	652	647	615
Örslösa	308	305	310	298	307
Saleby	219	218	217	213	232
Tun	219	210	208	207	206

== Demographics ==
This is a demographic table based on Lidköping Municipality's electoral districts in the 2022 Swedish general election sourced from SVT's election platform, in turn taken from SCB official statistics.

In total there were 40,403 residents, including 31,517 Swedish citizens of voting age. 49.3 % voted for the left coalition and 49.5 % for the right coalition. Indicators are in percentage points except population totals and income.

Location	Residents	Citizen adults	Left vote	Right vote	Employed	Swedish parents	Foreign heritage	Income SEK	Degree
Location			%	%					
Dalängen	2,047	1,477	57.5	40.9	80	79	21	26,421	43
Framnäs	1,743	1,356	57.4	40.5	72	71	29	21,445	32
Fredriksdal	1,771	1,388	51.1	47.4	76	70	30	22,875	28
Gamla stadens C	1,793	1,496	47.4	50.7	77	74	26	24,133	34
Hovby-Majåker	2,062	1,571	53.9	45.6	91	93	7	29,771	50
Järpås	1,326	1,027	42.1	57.3	80	90	10	25,426	23
Lidåker-Ljunghed	1,819	1,467	54.0	44.5	86	87	13	25,252	36
Margretelund N	1,813	1,346	49.9	47.5	67	61	39	20,152	24
Margretelund S	1,853	1,387	56.2	42.5	73	73	27	24,352	29
Nya staden N	1,779	1,482	53.9	45.1	79	83	17	24,443	41
Nya staden S	1,932	1,601	52.1	46.4	75	82	18	24,811	44
Otterstad	1,717	1,418	39.5	59.1	86	95	5	26,322	37
Råda	2,199	1,604	48.2	51.4	90	93	7	29,656	54
Saleby-N Härene	1,975	1,542	46.8	52.6	91	93	7	29,138	45
Stenhammar	2,196	1,650	45.8	53.6	90	95	5	31,474	57
Sunnersberg	1,975	1,468	46.8	52.6	91	93	7	29,138	45
Tofta-Ulriksdal	1,534	1,209	50.1	49.2	90	96	4	29,816	49
Tun-Gillstad	1,591	1,279	45.2	54.0	84	95	5	26,318	38
Vinninga-Filsbäck	2,121	1,641	46.0	52.8	87	93	7	27,933	37
Wennerberg	1,500	1,192	55.1	43.2	82	76	24	25,156	38
Ågårdsområdet	2,059	1,663	49.7	49.3	84	89	11	27,818	46
Örslösa	1,598	1,253	47.4	51.8	88	95	5	26,472	35
Source: SVT

== Symbol ==
Lidköping is developing a profile plan to market itself as "Lidköping by Vänern" and to this end have established the use of a logo depicting its location by Vänern. This logo is used in all official contexts, and also on the road signs when entering Lidköping.

== See also ==
- Köping (concept)
