= 2004–05 Scottish Second Division =

Scottish Second Division
- Season: 2004–05
- Champions: Brechin City
- Promoted: Brechin City; Stranraer
- Relegated: Arbroath; Berwick Rangers
- Top goalscorer: Chris Templeman (21)

The 2004–05 Scottish Second Division was won by Brechin City who, along with second placed Stranraer, gained promotion to the First Division. Arbroath and Berwick Rangers, meanwhile, were relegated to the Third Division.

== Table ==
Pos	Team	Pld	W	D	L	GF	GA	GD	Pts	Promotion or relegation
1	Brechin City (C, P)	36	22	6	8	81	43	+38	72	Promotion to the First Division
2	Stranraer (P)	36	18	9	9	48	41	+7	63	Promotion to the First Division
3	Greenock Morton	36	18	8	10	60	37	+23	62	
4	Stirling Albion	36	14	9	13	56	55	+1	51	
5	Forfar Athletic	36	13	8	15	51	45	+6	47	
6	Alloa Athletic	36	12	10	14	66	68	−2	46	
7	Dumbarton	36	11	9	16	43	53	−10	42	
8	Ayr United	36	11	9	16	39	54	−15	42	
9	Arbroath (R)	36	10	8	18	49	73	−24	38	Relegation to the Third Division
10	Berwick Rangers (R)	36	8	10	18	40	64	−24	34	Relegation to the Third Division

Source: "2004-2005 Second Division - SPFL Archive". SPFL (in Malay).
Rules for classification: 1) points; 2) goal difference; 3) number of goals scored.
(C) Champions; (P) Promoted; (R) Relegated

== Top scorers ==
Scorer	Team	Goals
(Scotland) Chris Templeman	Brechin City / Greenock Morton	21
(Scotland) Paul Shields	Forfar Athletic	20
(Scotland) Steven Hampshire	Brechin City	15
(Scotland) Paul Ritchie	Brechin City	14
(Scotland) David Graham	Stranraer	14
(Scotland) Paul Tosh	Forfar Athletic	13
(Scotland) Greg Henslee	Arbroath	11
(Scotland) Graeme Gibson	Brechin City	11
(Scotland) Iain Russell	Dumbarton	11
(England) Peter Weatherson	Greenock Morton	10
(Scotland) Robert Dunn	Stirling Albion	10
(Scotland) Chris Millar	Greenock Morton	10
(Scotland) Stewart Kean	Ayr United	10

== Attendances ==
The average attendances for Division Two clubs for season 2004–05 are shown below:

Club	Average
Greenock Morton	2,683
Ayr United	1,357
Dumbarton	900
Stirling Albion	835
Stranraer	759
Brechin City	680
Alloa Athletic	601
Forfar Athletic	596
Arbroath	576
Berwick Rangers	421
