= Ian Branfoot =

English footballer and manager

Personal information
- Full name: Ian Grant Branfoot
- Date of birth: 26 January 1947 (age 79)
- Place of birth: Gateshead, England
- Height: 5 ft 10 in (1.78 m)
- Position: Full-back

Youth career
- Gateshead

Senior career*
Years	Team	Apps	(Gls)
1965–1969	Sheffield Wednesday	36	(0)
1969–1973	Doncaster Rovers	156	(5)
1973–1977	Lincoln City	166	(11)
Total		358	(16)

Managerial career
- 1984–1989: Reading
- 1991–1994: Southampton
- 1994–1996: Fulham
- * Club domestic league appearances and goals

Ian Grant Branfoot (born 26 January 1947) is an English former football player and manager.

Born in Gateshead, he played as a full-back, and after starting at Gateshead joined Sheffield Wednesday, making his Football League debut in 1965. After 42 senior appearances for the club he left in 1969–70 for Doncaster Rovers. He made over 150 League appearances for Rovers, and after moving to Lincoln City in 1973–74, he went on to make over 150 league appearances for the Imps as well.

Branfoot was manager of Reading from 31 January 1984 to 23 October 1989. He must rank as one of Reading's most successful managers, leading Reading to promotion from Division 4 to Division 3 in 1984 based on the good work of Maurice Evans, and then promotion from Division 3 to Division 2 as champions in 1986. This last achievement included a record breaking start to the season of 13 straight wins. The club maintained a 13th position the next season but were relegated in 1988. However, in the same season that they won the Full Members Cup beating Luton Town 4–1 at Wembley.

He became manager of Southampton in June 1991, remaining in this position until January 1994. He then managed Fulham between 1994 and 1996. Branfoot later had a spell at Sunderland as academy director and at Leeds United as a scout. He also coached at Winchester College.

== Honours ==
Reading

- Football League Third Division: 1985–86
- Full Members' Cup: 1987–88

Southampton

- Full Members' Cup runner-up: 1991–92
