= 2000–01 Livingston F.C. season =

Livingston
2000–01 season
- Manager: Jim Leishman
- Stadium: Almondvale Stadium
- Scottish First Division: Winners
- Scottish Cup: Semi-final
- League Cup: Third round
- Challenge Cup: Runners-up
- Top goalscorer: League: David Bingham (14); All: David Bingham (20)
Home colours	Away colours

Season 2000-01 saw Livingston compete in the Scottish First Division. They also competed in the Challenge Cup, League Cup and the Scottish Cup.

== Summary ==
During Season 2000-01 Livingston won the Scottish First Division. They reached the final of the Challenge Cup, losing to Airdrieonians, the third round of the League Cup, and the semi-final of the Scottish Cup.

== Results & fixtures ==
Win Draw Loss

=== Scottish First Division ===
5 August 2000 1	Greenock Morton	0 – 2	Livingston	Cappielow
		BBC Report	McCulloch 58'; Bingham 83'	Referee: Jim Fleming

12 August 2000 2	Livingston	3 – 1	Inverness Caledonian Thistle	Almondvale Stadium
	Deas 24'; Crabbe 51'; Wilson 86'	BBC Report	Stewart 75'	Referee: Barry Orr

19 August 2000 3	Clyde	1 – 1	Livingston	Broadwood Stadium
	Kane 70'	BBC Report	Anderson 74'	Referee: Ian Frickleton

26 August 2000 4	Alloa Athletic	0 – 6	Livingston	Recreation Park
		BBC Report	Bingham 35'; McCulloch 53', 78'; Hagen 62'; Fleming 74'; McCormick 83'	Referee: Steve Kaney

9 September 2000 5	Livingston	2 – 0	Ayr United	Almondvale Stadium
	Wilson 5'; Bingham 49'	BBC Report	Hurst (red card) 79'	Referee: Willie Young

16 September 2000 6	Livingston	0 – 4	Raith Rovers	Almondvale Stadium
		BBC Report	Andrews 4', 68'; Burns 15'; Tosh 39'	Referee: J Smith

23 September 2000 7	Airdrieonians	1 – 2	Livingston	Excelsior Stadium
	Prest 47'	BBC Report	Anderson 48'; Bingham 59 pen.' Coughlin (red card) 77'	Referee: John Underhill

30 September 2000 8	Falkirk	3 – 2	Livingston	Brockville Park
	Nicholls 48'; Henry 56'; Craig 67'	BBC Report	Coughlan 17'; Burns 25'; Fleming (red card) 0'	Referee: Garry Mitchell

7 October 2000 9	Livingston	3 – 1	Ross County	Almondvale Stadium
	Keith 39', 55'; Bingham 70 pen.'	BBC Report	Bone 53'; Cunnington (red card) 70'	Referee: David Somers

14 October 2000 10	Livingston	1 – 0	Greenock Morton	Almondvale Stadium
	Bingham 45 pen.'	BBC Report		Attendance: John Rowbotham

21 October 2000 11	Inverness Caledonian Thistle	2 – 2	Livingston	Caledonian Stadium
	McBain 59'; Sheerin 69'	BBC Report	McCulloch 31', 58'	Referee: Alan Gemmill

28 October 2000 12	Livingston	4 – 0	Alloa Athletic	Almondvale Stadium
	Conway 29 o.g.' Bingham 42 pen.', 85 pen.' Burns 75'	BBC Report		Referee: Barry Orr

4 November 2000 13	Ayr United	1 – 1	Livingston	Somerset Park
	Teale 36'; Hughes (yellow card) 86' (red card)	BBC Report	Fleming 34'	Referee: Kevin Toner

11 November 2000 14	Livingston	2 – 2	Airdrieonians	Almondvale Stadium
	Keith 9'; Burns 11'	BBC Report	Taylor 14'; Calderon 66'; Prest (red card) 81'	Referee: Willie Young

25 November 2000 15	Ross County	0 – 2	Livingston	Victoria Park
		BBC Report	Burns 12'; Bingham 81'	Referee: Mike Ritchie

2 December 2000 16	Livingston	4 – 1	Falkirk	Almondvale Stadium
	Wilson 8'; Coughlan 23'; Burns 42'; Bingham 80'	BBC Report	Roberts 90'	Referee: Dougie McDonald

5 December 2000 17	Raith Rovers	1 – 2	Livingston	Stark's Park
	Stein 90'	BBC Report	Bingham 21', 36'	Referee: Michael McCurry

9 December 2000 18	Livingston	2 – 0	Clyde	Almondvale Stadium
	Crabbe 17'; Tosh 66'	BBC Report		Referee: Stuart Dougal

16 December 2000 19	Greenock Morton	1 – 2	Livingston	Cappielow
	Matheson 11'		Britton 70'; Burns 85'	Referee: Colin Hardie

2 January 2001 20	Livingston	2 – 0	Raith Rovers	Almondvale Stadium
	Bingham 5'; Burns 22'	BBC Report		Referee: Bobby Orr

6 January 2001 21	Airdrieonians	1 – 1	Livingston	Excelsior Stadium
	Moreau 77'	BBC Report	Crabbe 44'; Tosh (red card) 64'	Referee: Michael McCurry

13 January 2001 22	Falkirk	1 – 0	Livingston	Brockville Park
	Hutchison 78'	BBC Report	Burns (red card) 29'	Referee: Willie Young

30 January 2001 23	Alloa Athletic	0 – 2	Livingston	Recreation Park
		BBC Report	Wilson 20'; Anderson 52'	Referee: Garry Mitchell

3 February 2001 24	Clyde	0 – 3	Livingston	Broadwood Stadium
	Keogh (red card) 75'	BBC Report	McPhee 18'; Wilson 45 pen.', 85'	Referee: John Fleming

24 February 2001 25	Livingston	1 – 0	Alloa Athletic	Almondvale Stadium
	Bingham 63'			Referee: George Clyde

3 March 2001 26	Ayr United	1 – 1		Somerset Park
	Bradford 90 pen.'	BBC Report	Wilson 16 pen.'	Referee: Stuart Dougal

20 March 2001 27	Livingston	0 – 1	Ayr United	Almondvale Stadium
			Annand 40'	Referee: David Somers

27 March 2001 28	Livingston	1 – 1	Ross County	Almondvale Stadium
	Wilson 32'	BBC Report	Robertson 19'	Referee: J Smith

31 March 2001 29	Raith Rovers	2 – 0	Livingston	Stark's Park
	Jones 19', 74'	BBC Report	Anderson (red card) 33'	Referee: John Underhill

3 April 2001 30	Livingston	4 – 1	Inverness Caledonian Thistle	Almondvale Stadium
	Xausa 20', 75'; Wilson 65 pen.', 88'	BBC Report	Wyness 79'	Referee: Eddie Martindale

7 April 2001 31	Ross County	0 – 1	Livingston	Victoria Park
		BBC Report	Wilson 53'	Referee: Hugh Dallas

21 April 2001 32	Livingston	2 – 0	Greenock Morton	Almondvale Stadium
	Xausa 28'; Fleming 83'	BBC Report		Referee: Brian Cassidy

24 April 2001 33	Livingston	3 – 0	Falkirk	Almondvale Stadium
	Fernández 20'; Wilson 58'; Jackson 77'			Referee: Stuart Dougal

28 April 2001 34	Inverness Caledonian Thistle	2 – 3	Livingston	Caledonian Stadium
	Sheerin 17', 90 pen.'	BBC Report	Fernandez 31'; Wilson 43 pen.' McCaffrey 53 o.g.'	Referee: Steve Kaney

1 May 2001 35	Livingston	5 – 0	Airdrieonians	Almondvale Stadium
	Britton 4', 5', 67'; McPhee 19'; Xausa 45'	BBC Report		Referee: Kenny Clark

5 May 2001 36	Livingston	0 – 2	Clyde	Almondvale Stadium
	Fleming (red card) 83'		Mitchell 30'; Hinds 67'	Referee: Eric Martindale

=== Scottish Challenge Cup ===
15 August 2000 First round	Partick Thistle	0 – 2	Livingston	Firhill Stadium
		BBC Report	Britton 82'; Wilson 90'	Referee: Brian McGarry

29 August 2000 Second round	Ross County	0 – 3	Livingston	Victoria Park
19:30		BBC Report	Bingham 50'; Britton 54', 80'	Referee: Alan Freeland

12 September 2000 Quarter-final	Livingston	3 – 1	Brechin City	Almondvale Stadium
19:30	McCormick 47'; Britton 66'; Keith 85'	BBC Report	Leask 23'	Referee: Eddie Martindale

26 September 2000 Semi-final	Livingston	2 – 1	East Stirlingshire	Almondvale Stadium
19:30	Bingham 21 pen.' Anderson 44'	BBC Report	McKechnie 4'	Referee: Eddie Martindale

19 November 2000 Final	Airdrieonians	2 – 2 (a.e.t.) (3 – 2 p)	Livingston	Broadwood Stadium
19:30	Prest 28'; McGuire 78'	BBC Report	Crabbe 15'; Anderson 50'	Attendance: 5,623; Referee: John Rowbotham

=== Scottish League Cup ===
22 August 2000 Second round	Dumbarton	0 – 4	Livingston	Boghead Park
19:45	Jack (red card) 44'	BBC Report	Hagen 4', 6'; Bingham 7 pen.', 44'	Referee: Kevin Toner

6 September 2000 Third round	Livingston	0 – 2	Heart of Midlothian	Almondvale Stadium
19:45		London Hearts	Cameron 15'; Naysmith 54'	Attendance: 5,549; Referee: Michael McCurry

=== Scottish Cup ===
27 January 2001 Third round	East Fife	1 – 4	Livingston	Bayview Stadium
19:30	Moffat 6'	BBC Report	Tosh (red card) 10'; Bingham 31'; Wilson 45', 75'; Britton 77'	Referee: Kevin Toner

17 February 2001 Fourth round	Livingston	0 – 0	Aberdeen	Almondvale Stadium
15:00		BBC Report		Referee: Kenny Clark

6 March 2001 Fourth round replay	Aberdeen	0 – 1	Livingston	Pittodrie Stadium
19:45		BBC Report	Crabbe 83'	Referee: Bobby Orr

10 March 2001 Quarter-final	Livingston	3 – 1	Peterhead	Almondvale Stadium
15:00	Anderson 19', 34'; Bingham 63'	BBC Report	Johnston 7'	Referee: John Rowbotham

14 April 2001 Semi-final	Hibernian	3 – 0	Livingston	Hampden Park
15:00	O'Neil 2', 76'; Zitelli 69'	BBC Report		Attendance: 24,658; Referee: Willie Young

== Statistics ==
=== League table ===
Pos	Team	Pld	W	D	L	GF	GA	GD	Pts	Promotion or relegation
1	Livingston (C, P)	36	23	7	6	72	31	+41	76	Promotion to the Premier League
2	Ayr United	36	19	12	5	73	41	+32	69	
3	Falkirk	36	16	8	12	57	59	−2	56	
4	Inverness CT	36	14	12	10	71	54	+17	54	
5	Clyde	36	11	14	11	44	46	−2	47	

Source: "2000-2001 First Division - SPFL Archive". SPFL.
Rules for classification: 1) points; 2) goal difference; 3) number of goals scored.
(C) Champions; (P) Promoted
