= 2000 Scottish Challenge Cup final =

- Event: 2000–01 Scottish Challenge Cup
Airdrieonians	Livingston
2	2
- After extra time Airdrieonians won 3–2 on penalties
- Date: 19 November 2000
- Venue: Broadwood Stadium, Cumbernauld
- Referee: John Rowbotham
- Attendance: 5,623

The 2000 Scottish Challenge Cup final was played on 19 November 2000, at Broadwood Stadium in Cumbernauld and was the 10th staging of the final in the history of the tournament. It was played between Airdrieonians and Livingston both of the First Division. Airdrieonians emerged winners after defeating Livingston 3–2 on penalties following a 2–2 draw after extra time.

== Route to the final ==
=== Airdrieonians ===
Round	Opposition	Score
First round	Queen of the South (h)	2–1
Second round	Hamilton Academical (a)	1–0
Quarter-final	Clydebank (h)	1–1 (a.e.t.) (4–3 pens)
Semi-final	Stranraer (a)	4–2

The first round draw brought Queen of the South to face Airdrieonians at the Excelsior Stadium with the home team emerging 2–1 victors. The second round was an away game at Hamilton Academical with Airdrie producing a 1–0 win and only clean sheet of the tournament. A home game against Clydebank was the reward for reaching the quarter-finals with The Diamonds edging the opposition 4–3 on penalties following a 1–1 draw after extra time. The semi-final draw paired the club with Stranraer away from home and Airdrie produced a 4–2 win to progress to the final. Airdrieonians reached the Scottish Challenge Cup final for the second time in its history since winning the 1994 final against Dundee.

=== Livingston ===
Round	Opposition	Score
First round	Partick Thistle (a)	2–0
Second round	Ross County (a)	3–0
Quarter-final	Brechin City (h)	3–1
Semi-final	East Stirlingshire (h)	2–1

Livingston were drawn against Partick Thistle away from home in the first round and produced a 2–0 victory over the club. The second round also saw the West Lothian club drawn away from home against Ross County but produced a 3–0 win and a second consecutive clean sheet. A first home game of the tournament for Livingston was drawn in the quarter-finals against Brechin City which saw the club produce a 3–1 win to progress to the semi-finals. The opposition provided was East Stirlingshire, again at Almondvale and a 2–1 victory saw Livingston reach the Scottish Challenge Cup final for the first time ever.

== Pre-match ==
=== Analysis ===
Airdrieonians and Livingston both played two games at their respective homes of Excelsior Stadium and Almondvale Stadium and two games on the road. In the process Airdrie scored a total of eight goals whilst conceding four, compared with Livingston's ten goals scored and two conceded. Livingston completed two clean sheets over Airdrieonians' one. Airdrie reached the final for the second time after winning the 1994 tournament whilst it was the first time in the final for Livingston.

== Match ==
19 November 2000
15:00

Airdrieonians	2–2 (a.e.t.)	Livingston
Prest 28'; McGuire 78'	Report	Crabbe 15'; Anderson 50'
Penalties
	3–2

Broadwood Stadium, Cumbernauld
Attendance: 5,623
Referee: John Rowbotham

=== Teams ===
AIRDRIEONIANS:
GK	1	(Spain) Javier Sanchez Broto
DF	2	(Republic of Ireland) Paul Armstrong		(substituted off) 105'
DF	3	(Scotland) Austin McCann
DF	4	(Scotland) Darren Brady
DF	5	(Scotland) Eddie Forrest
DF	6	(Scotland) Craig Ireland
FW	7	(Scotland) John Elliot		(substituted off) 69'
MF	8	(France) Fabrice Moreau
FW	9	(Argentina) Martin Prest	Booked
MF	10	(Spain) Antonio Calderón		(substituted off) 108'
MF	11	(Spain) David Fernandez
Substitutes:
MF	12	(Scotland) Scott Boyce
FW	14	(Scotland) David McGuire		(substituted in) 69'
MF	15	(Spain) Jesús García Sanjuán		(substituted in) 108'
DF	16	(Spain) Salvador Capín		(substituted in) 105'
GK	17	(England) Tom Phillips
Manager:
(Scotland) Steve Archibald

LIVINGSTON:
GK	1	(Scotland) Neil Alexander
DF	2	(Scotland) Allan McManus	Booked
MF	3	(Scotland) Derek Fleming
DF	4	(Scotland) John Anderson	Booked
DF	5	(Republic of Ireland) Graham Coughlan
DF	6	(Scotland) Paul Deas
MF	7	(Scotland) Barry Wilson		(substituted off) 106'
MF	8	(Scotland) Mark McCulloch	Booked
FW	9	(Scotland) Marino Keith		(substituted off) 81'
FW	10	(Scotland) Scott Crabbe	Booked
MF	11	(Scotland) David Bingham		(substituted off) 73'
Substitutes:
DF	12	(Scotland) Michael Hart		(substituted in) 106'
FW	14	(Scotland) Brian McPhee		(substituted in) 81'
MF	15	(Scotland) David Hagen		(substituted in) 73'
FW	16	(Scotland) Mark McCormick
GK	17	(Scotland) David McEwan
Manager:
(Scotland) Jim Leishman
