= 2000–01 Scottish Challenge Cup =

2000–01 Bell's Challenge Cup
Tournament details
- Country: Scotland
- Teams: 30

Final positions
- Champions: Airdrieonians
- Runners-up: Livingston

Tournament statistics
- Matches played: 29
- Goals scored: 97 (3.34 per match)

The 2000–01 Scottish Challenge Cup was the tenth season of the competition, which was also known as the Bell's Challenge Cup for sponsorship reasons. It was competed for by the 30 member clubs of the Scottish Football League. The defending champions were Alloa Athletic, who defeated Inverness Caledonian Thistle 5–4 on penalties in the 1999 final; and lost 3–2 to Inverness Caledonian Thistle in the First round.

The final was played on 19 November 2000, between Airdrieonians and Livingston at Broadwood Stadium in Cumbernauld. Airdrieonians won 3–2 on penalties after a 2–2 draw after extra time, to win the tournament for the second time after winning it in 1994.

== Schedule ==
Round	First match date	Fixtures	Clubs
First round	Tuesday 15 August 2000	14	30 → 16
Second round	Tue 29 Aug/Sat 2 September 2000	8	16 → 8
Quarter-finals	Tuesday 12/19 September 2000	4	8 → 4
Semi-finals	Tuesday 26 September 2000	2	4 → 2
Final	Sunday 19 November 2000	1	2 → 1

== First round ==
Hamilton Academical and Stenhousemuir received random byes into the second round.

15 August 2000	Airdrieonians	2 – 1 (a.e.t.)	Queen of the South	New Broomfield, Airdrie
	Calderón 66'; Clark 92'		Atkinson 47'; Hodge (red card) 85'

15 August 2000	Albion Rovers	0–1	Clydebank	Cliftonhill, Coatbridge
			Coyne 34'

15 August 2000	Alloa Athletic	2–3	Inverness Caledonian Thistle	Recreation Park, Alloa
	Hamilton 1', 7'		Stewart 53', 82'; Bavidge 85'

15 August 2000	Brechin City	3–1	Ayr United	Glebe Park, Brechin
	Duffy 23' (o.g.); Sturrock 45'; Grant 79'		McGinlay 50'

15 August 2000	Cowdenbeath	2 – 1 (a.e.t.)	Falkirk	Central Park, Cowdenbeath
	Brown 18'; Juskowiak 113'		Hutchison 5'

15 August 2000	East Stirlingshire	3–0	East Fife	Firs Park, Falkirk
	Hislop 24'; McKechnie 71'; Lynes 83'

15 August 2000	Elgin City	2–4	Dumbarton	Borough Briggs, Elgin
	Green 62', 63'		Flannery 44', 51', 65'; Brown 78'

15 August 2000	Forfar Athletic	1 – 1 (a.e.t.) (2–4 p)	Peterhead	Station Park, Forfar
	McPhee 49'		Clark 14'

15 August 2000	Partick Thistle	0–2	Livingston	Firhill Stadium, Glasgow
			Britton 82'; Wilson 90'

15 August 2000	Queen's Park	2–0	Montrose	Hampden Park, Glasgow
	Gallagher 8', 40' (pen.)

15 August 2000	Raith Rovers	0–4	Greenock Morton	Stark's Park, Kirkcaldy
			Whalen 25', 61'; Matheson 56'; Kerr 81'

15 August 2000	Ross County	2–1	Clyde	Victoria Park, Dingwall
	Bone 16'; Henderson 61'		Cannie 71' (pen.)

15 August 2000	Stirling Albion	2–3	Arbroath	Forthbank Stadium, Stirling
	O'Neill 28'; McAulay 77'; Millar (red card) 55'		Rowe 18'; McGlashan 46', 56' (pen.); King (red card) 76'

15 August 2000	Stranraer	4–2	Berwick Rangers	Stair Park, Stranraer
	Wright 2'; Walker; Geraghty 49'; Harty 56'		McMartin 68'; Oliver 70'

Source: Soccerbase

== Second round ==
29 August 2000	Brechin City	1 – 1 (a.e.t.) (4–2 p)	Queen's Park	Glebe Park, Brechin
	Sturrock 27'		Finlayson 20'

29 August 2000	Cowdenbeath	1–2	Stenhousemuir	Central Park, Cowdenbeath
	McDowell 68'		Gibson 69'; Menelows 72'

29 August 2000	East Stirlingshire	3–2	Greenock Morton	Firs Park, Falkirk
	Gordon 48'; Lynes 62'; Todd 80'		Boukraa 13'; Matheson 81'

29 August 2000	Ross County	0–3	Livingston	Victoria Park, Dingwall
			Bingham 50'; Britton 54', 80'

2 September 2000	Arbroath	2–0	Dumbarton	Gayfield Park, Arbroath
	Mallan 88'; Brownlie 90' (pen.)

2 September 2000	Clydebank	1–0	Peterhead
	McCormick 15'		Cooper (red card) 31'

2 September 2000	Hamilton Academical	0 – 1 (a.e.t.)	Airdrieonians
			Pacífico 97'

2 September 2000	Inverness Caledonian Thistle	1–2	Stranraer	Caledonian Stadium, Inverness
	Bavidge 57'		Rae 35'; Harty 48' (pen.)

Source: Soccerbase

== Quarter-finals ==
12 September 2000

East Stirlingshire	4–0	Stenhousemuir
Ferguson 1'; Hislop 2'; Hislop 3'; Davidson 4' (o.g.)	Report

Firs Park, Falkirk

12 September 2000

Livingston	3–1	Brechin City
McCormick 47'; Britton 66'; Keith 85'	Report	Leask 23'

Almondvale Stadium, Livingston

12 September 2000

Stranraer	3–2	Arbroath
Harty 10', 36'; Geraghty 16'	Report	Mercer 45'; McGlashan 48'

Stair Park, Stranraer

19 September 2000

Airdrieonians	1–1 (a.e.t.)	Clydebank
Prest 55'	Report	Jacquin 65'
Penalties
	4–3

New Broomfield, Airdrie

== Semi-finals ==
26 September 2000

Livingston	2–1	East Stirlingshire
Bingham 21' (pen.); Anderson 44'	Report	McKechnie 4'

Almondvale Stadium, Livingston

26 September 2000

Stranraer	2 – 4 (a.e.t.)	Airdrieonians
Harty 8'; George 20'	Report	Prest 3'; Fernández 10'; Taylor 101'; McKeown 113'

Stair Park, Stranraer

== Final ==
19 November 2000
15:00

Airdrieonians	2–2 (a.e.t.)	Livingston
Prest 28'; McGuire 78'	Report	Crabbe 15'; Anderson 50'
Penalties
	3–2

Broadwood Stadium, Cumbernauld
Attendance: 5,623
Referee: J Rowbotham
