= Andrew Kane =

Andrew Kane may refer to:

- Andrew Gardiner Kane (born 1947), former Unionist politician in Northern Ireland
- Andrew Cane (fl. 1602–1650), also Kayne, Kene, Keine, and other variants, English comic actor
- Andy Kane, "Handy Andy", British TV presenter
- Andy Kane (footballer), Scottish footballer with Clyde, Stranraer and Parramatta Eagles
