= Darren Brady =

Scottish footballer (born 1981)

Personal information
- Full name: Darren Simon Brady
- Date of birth: 4 November 1981 (age 44)
- Place of birth: Glasgow, Scotland
- Height: 5 ft 10 in (1.78 m)
- Position: Midfielder

Youth career
- Clyde Boys Club
- Queen's Park

Senior career*
Years	Team	Apps	(Gls)
1999–2001	Airdrieonians	26	(0)
2001	Dundee United	8	(0)
2001–2003	Livingston	7	(0)
2002–2003	→Raith Rovers (loan)	34	(5)
2003–2005	Raith Rovers	46	(12)
2005–2007	Partick Thistle	72	(19)
2007–2008	Ross County	24	(8)
2008–2011	Forfar Athletic	50	(2)
2011–2013	Pollok		
- * Club domestic league appearances and goals

Darren Simon Brady (born 11 April 1981) is a Scottish retired footballer who played as a midfielder.

== Career ==
Born in Glasgow, Brady started his career with Airdrieonians but left in 2001 after the club went into administration, though prior to it folding altogether. He had trials at Hibernian and Barcelona through Airdrie manager Steve Archibald's connections to those clubs, before joining Dundee United for the remainder of the 2000–01 season along with David McGuire, making eight appearances from the bench.

He then spent two seasons with Livingston but failed to make an impact and played only six times , in the Scottish League Cup, spending the second year on loan at Raith Rovers where he played regularly, working under former Airdrie teammate Antonio Calderón as manager. A permanent move to Raith followed in 2003 and he remained there until January 2005, winning the Scottish Second Division title then being named captain in a struggling team, before moving to Partick Thistle where he experienced a relegation followed by promotion.

Brady transferred to Ross County in July 2007 where he again was part of a side that won the third tier championship, and then on to Forfar Athletic a year later, being signed by the same manager – Dick Campbell – who had brought him to Partick and Ross County. The second of his three seasons at the Angus club was ruined by a cruciate ligament injury to his knee. In July 2011, Junior side Pollok signed the midfielder. After a promising season, Brady was injured early in the 2012–13 season, and on returning, he was unable to replicate his form from before. He came on as a substitute in the last 30 minutes of the Central League Cup Final to help secure Pollok's 3–0 win against Ashfield. Brady later retired after serious knee injury prevented him carrying on playing.

== Personal life ==
Brady's elder brother Garry was also a professional footballer, whose clubs included St Mirren.

== Career statistics ==
Club	Season	League		Cup		Lg Cup		Other		Total	
Club	Season	Apps	Goals	Apps	Goals	Apps	Goals	Apps	Goals	Apps	Goals
Airdrieonians	1998–99	1	0	0	0	0	0	0	0	1	0
Airdrieonians	1999–00	4	0	0	0	0	0	0	0	4	0
Airdrieonians	2000–01	21	0	1	0	2	0	5	0	29	0
Airdrieonians	Total	26	0	1	0	2	0	5	0	34	0
Dundee United	2000–01	1	0	0	0	0	0	0	0	1	0
Livingston	2001–02	0	0	0	0	1	0	0	0	1	0
Livingston	2002–03	0	0	0	0	0	0	0	0	0	0
Livingston	Total	0	0	0	0	1	0	0	0	1	0
Raith Rovers (loan)	2002–03	34	1	3	0	0	0	1	0	38	4
Raith Rovers	2003–04	27	0	1	0	1	0	3	0	38	0
Raith Rovers	2004–05	19	1	1	0	1	0	1	0	22	1
Raith Rovers	Total	80	2	5	0	2	0	5	0	98	5
Partick Thistle	2004–05	11	0	0	0	0	0	0	0	11	0
Partick Thistle	2005–06	31	2	6	0	2	0	7	0	43	2
Partick Thistle	2006–07	30	2	3	0	2	1	1	0	36	3
Partick Thistle	Total	72	4	9	0	4	1	8	0	90	5
Ross County	2007–08	15	1	2	0	1	0	2	0	20	1
Forfar Athletic	2008–09	30	1	2	0	1	0	1	0	34	1
Forfar Athletic	2009–10	5	0	0	0	2	0	2	0	9	0
Forfar Athletic	2010–11	15	1	0	0	0	0	1	0	16	1
Forfar Athletic	Total	50	2	2	0	3	0	4	0	59	2
Career total		244	9	18	0	13	1	24	0	299	10

== Honours ==
Airdrieonians

- Scottish Challenge Cup: 2000–01

Raith Rovers

- Scottish Football League Second Division: 2002–03

Partick Thistle

- Scottish Football League Second Division play-off winners: 2005–06

Ross County

- Scottish Football League Second Division: 2007–08
