= George Tidy =

Scottish footballer (1930–2023)

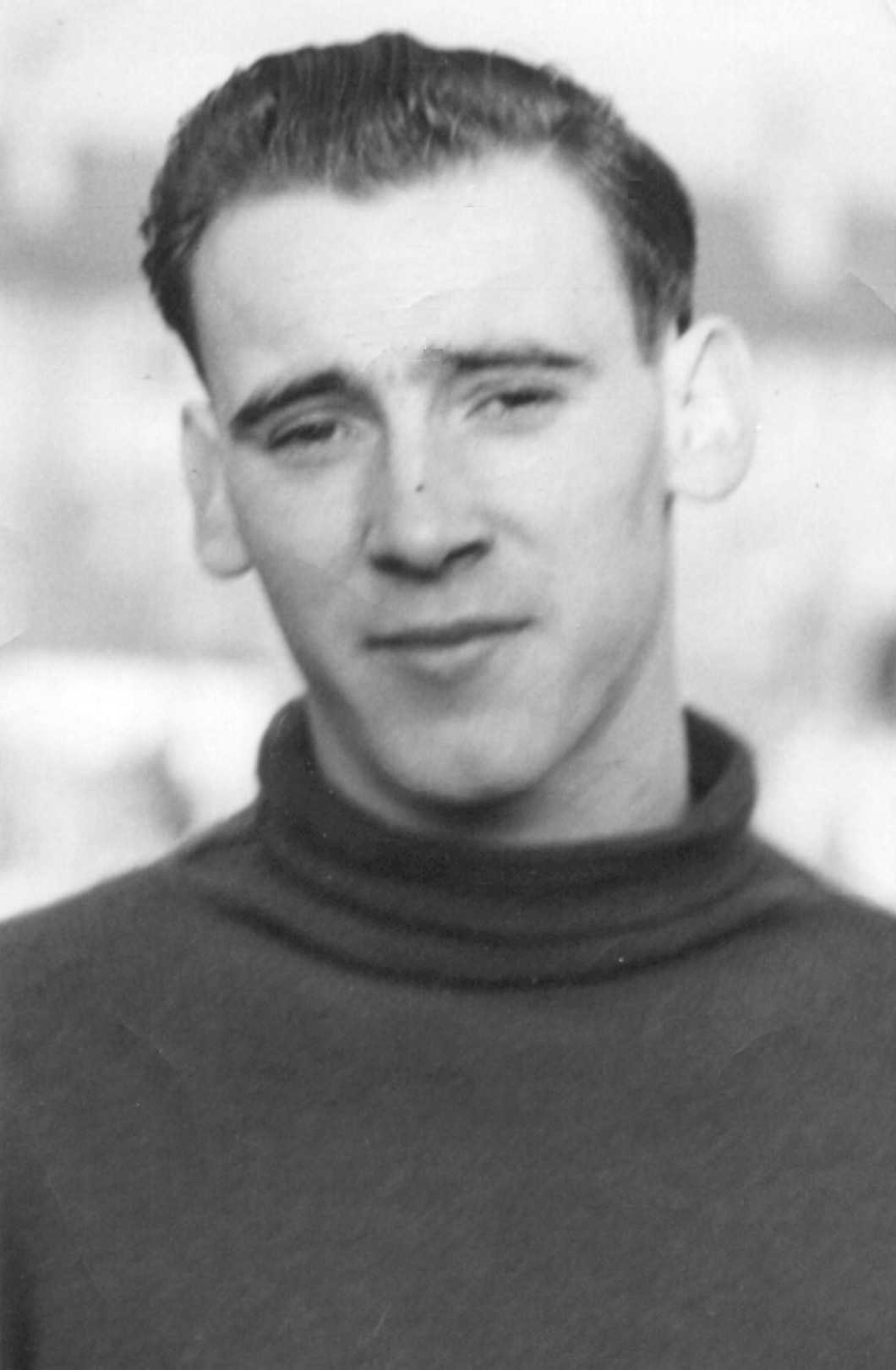
- Tidy in the 1950y

Personal information
- Full name: George Thomas Tidy
- Date of birth: 28 July 1930
- Place of birth: Edinburgh, Scotland
- Date of death: 12 February 2023 (aged 92)
- Place of death: Edinburgh, Scotland

Senior career*
Years	Team	Apps	(Gls)
1946–1949	Royston Rosebery		
1949–1952	Edinburgh City		
1952	Dunfermline Athletic	11	
1952–1955	Brechin City	124	
1956	Arniston Rangers		
1956–1957	Berwick Rangers	15	
1957	Peebles Rovers		
- * Club domestic league appearances and goals

George Thomas Tidy (28 July 1930 – 12 February 2023) was a Scottish footballer who played as a goalkeeper during the 1950s.

Although he initially started as a centre-half with Royston Rosebery in 1946, he played in goal shortly before being transferred to Edinburgh City during the 1949–50 season. He joined Dunfermline Athletic at the start of the 1951–52 season, who at the time were in the Scottish Football League "B" Division. He made eleven first-team appearances; 9 in the league and 2 in the Supplementary Cup before moving on to Brechin City at the start of the 1952–53 season.

Tidy was part of the Brechin City team which won the Scottish Football League "C" Division Championship title in the 1953–54 season and was the youngest member of the team. He was the only member of the Brechin City team to play in all 42 games during the 1952–53 season and all 40 games during the Championship winning season of 1953–54. He was freed at the end of the 1954–55 season and joined junior side Arniston Rangers FC in June 1956. But he returned to Senior football with Berwick Rangers FC in October 1956 making 13 league appearances and 2 in the Scottish Cup before leaving Senior football in August 1957. He then returned to the Junior ranks to complete his playing career with Peebles Rovers FC.

== Honours ==
Brechin City

- Scottish Football League Third Division: 1953–54
