= Stuart Sorbie =

Scottish footballer (born 1963)

Personal information
- Date of birth: 7 September 1963 (age 63)
- Place of birth: Glasgow, Scotland
- Position: Forward

Senior career*
Years	Team	Apps	(Gls)
1983–1988	Alloa	147	(43)
1988–1989	St Johnstone	38	(7)
1989–1990	Raith Rovers	14	(1)
1989–1990	→ Alloa (loan)	9	(2)
1990–1994	Arbroath	149	(49)
1994–1995	Meadowbank Thistle	32	(5)
1995–1996	Livingston	11	(0)
1996–2000	Brechin	118	(23)
2002–2003	East Stirlingshire	2	(0)

Managerial career
- 2004–2005: Arbroath (assistant)
- 2006–2012: Annan (assistant)
- * Club domestic league appearances and goals

Stuart Sorbie (born 7 September 1963) is a Scottish former footballer who played as a forward for Livingston.

== Playing career ==
He started his career with Alloa and scored 43 times in 147 games for the Wasps.

Sorbie's form earned him a move to St Johnstone in 1988. After 38 appearances and 7 goals, the striker departed McDiarmid Park in the summer of 1989.

The striker then signed for Raith Rovers but only made a single goal in 14 appearances at Stark's Park before returning to Alloa on loan for the remainder of the 1989–1990 season.

Following his departure from Raith Rovers, Sorbie signed for Arbroath in 1990. His goal scoring form improved at Gayfield Park as he netted 49 times in 149 appearances over 4 years for the Red Lichties.

In 1994, he signed for Meadowbank Thistle and made 32 appearances, scoring 5 times for the club. He remained at the club as they were named and relocated to Livingston, West Lothian in 1995. He made 11 appearances for the new club without scoring, before departing in 1996.

Sorbie signed for Brechin City in 1996 where he got the regular game time he did not get at his former club. He made 118 appearances and scored 23 times for the City.

== Coaching career ==
He left Brechin in 2000 and took up a coaching role with East Stirlingshire.

In 2004, he was Harry Cairney's assistant at Arbroath.

Sorbie also assisted Cairney at Annan Athletic between 2006 and 2012. He remained at the club when Cairney tendered his resignation on 20 December 2012.
