= Jim Morton (footballer, born 1956) =

Scottish footballer

Personal information
- Full name: James Michael Morton
- Date of birth: 29 October 1956 (age 70)
- Place of birth: Dundee, Scotland
- Position: Midfielder

Youth career
- 1973–1974: Dundee North End Juniors

Senior career*
| Years | Team | Apps | (Gls) |
| 1974–1978 | Brechin City | 124 | (22) |
| 1978–1979 | Berwick Rangers | 54 | (25) |
| 1979–1986 | St. Johnstone | 205 | (47) |
| 1986–1987 | Brisbane Lions | | |
| 1987–1990 | Forfar Athletic | 80 | (6) |
| 1990–1993 | Arbroath | 45 | (9) |
| Total | | 509 | (109) |
- * Club domestic league appearances and goals

James Michael Morton (born 29 October 1956) is a Scottish former footballer who played for several Scottish clubs in the 1970, 80s and 90s. Morton played in over 500 games and scored over 119 goals in all competitions during his career and is perhaps best known for his spell at St Johnstone F.C. where he remains the club's record top midfield goal scorer.

== Career ==
Jim Morton first moved into senior football when he was seventeen, signing for Brechin City F.C. from Dundee North End in 1974. Throughout the next four years he established himself in the Brechin side. Several clubs had shown interest in the young Dundonian, but it was in August 1978 that Berwick Rangers F.C. came in to make a bid for the midfielder. A fee of £10,000 (then a club record) along with Billy Laing moving to Glebe Park was enough to bring Morton to Berwick.

After a promising season's start Berwick Rangers F.C. found themselves sitting off the pace at the top. It was then that the team and Morton recorded a run of seven consecutive wins. Morton scored six goals in four games and Rangers were safe. Morton was the season's top scorer with nineteen goals.

In November 1979 St Johnstone F.C. (Saints) came in with a £30,000 offer, thereby increasing his value threefold in the space of sixteen months. The figure equalled Saints record transfer fee paid. Nicknamed "Silky" at Muirton, Morton became one of the best midfielders ever to have played for the Saints. In 1981–82 he led the club's scoring charts with another nineteen goal haul. He remains to this day the club's record goal scoring midfielder.

After Saints were relegated from the Premier league, Morton accepted an offer from Brisbane Lions, Queensland and left for Australia in 1986. He returned to Scotland late in 1987 and instead of going to Saints he signed for Forfar Athletic F.C. usually playing in his familiar midfield role, but occasionally appearing in the no 3 shirt. Morton played his 100th league encounter in Forfar colours.

After three years at Station Park he opened the final chapter in his playing career when he moved along the road to Arbroath. Morton's final season as senior was 92/93 and decided to retire from the game completely and concentrate on a career in banking.

Despite spending part of his career abroad, Morton still managed over 500 league appearances netting in excess of 100 goals.

Currently residing in East Yorkshire, England.
