= The James Young High School =

Secondary school in Livingston, West Lothian, Scotland

Coordinates: 55.8802°N 3.51537°W

Location
- Quentin Rise; Livingston, West Lothian, EH54 6NE; Scotland

Information
- Type: Secondary school
- Established: 1982
- Local authority: The West Lothian Council
- Head teacher: Patricia Gallagher
- Staff: Over 100
- Gender: Mixed
- Enrolment: 1120
- Houses: Jura, Yell, Harris
- Colour: Purple
- Local authority: West Lothian
- Named after: James Young (Scottish chemist)
- Website: https://jyhs.westlothian.org.uk/

The James Young High School is a secondary school in Dedridge, Livingston, West Lothian, Scotland. The school opened in 1982 and was named after James Young, who patented the process of extracting oil from coal and shale.

James Young High School is a coeducational state school which has over 1100 pupils. The head teacher was Christopher Horne until the 2012–2013 school year when he retired and was replaced by Catrina Hatch. In 2018 she was then replaced by the previous Deputy Head Teacher P Gallagher. She is currently assisted by her Depute Headteachers E Russell, C McTiernan and M Sammons as well as Business Manager A McKeown. There are also 7 PTCs for Curriculum and 4 PTCs for Pupil Support.

The school uniform consists of a white shirt, black trousers, and a solid purple tie for S1-S3 or a black tie with purple and white stripes for S4-S6. The catchment primary schools are: Bankton Primary, Bellsquarry Primary, Dedridge Primary and Williamston Primary.

== Notable alumni ==
- Martin Scott
- Craig Benson
- Derek Fleming
