= John Ritchie (footballer, born 1947) =

Scottish footballer and manager (1947–2018)

Personal information
- Full name: John Brough Ritchie
- Date of birth: 12 June 1947
- Place of birth: Auchterderran, Scotland
- Date of death: 2 June 2018 (aged 70)
- Position: Goalkeeper

Senior career*
Years	Team	Apps	(Gls)
1964–1967	Cowdenbeath	99	(0)
1967–1971	Brechin City	128	(0)
1971–1974	Bradford City	64	(0)
1974–1975	Dundee United	0	(0)
1975–1981	Brechin City	159	(0)
Total		450	(0)

Managerial career
- 1987–1993: Brechin City
- * Club domestic league appearances and goals

John Brough Ritchie (12 June 1947 – 2 June 2018) was a Scottish football player and manager. Ritchie played as a goalkeeper and made almost 300 Scottish Football League (SFL) appearances for Brechin City over two spells, and also played for Cowdenbeath, Dundee United and English club Bradford City. He later managed Brechin between 1987 and 1993, winning the SFL Second Division title in 1990.

== Career ==
Ritchie began his career in the mid-1960s with Cowdenbeath and went on to play over 100 matches for the Central Park side before moving to Brechin City in 1967. After a similar length of time at Glebe Park, Ritchie moved south in the early 1970s to Bradford City, where he averaged around 20 league matches in each of his three seasons. A return to Scotland in 1974 with Dundee United brought no games and Ritchie returned to Brechin shortly afterwards, completing another six years before his retirement in 1981. Overall, Ritchie played in exactly 450 league matches.

Upon retiring, Ritchie stayed with Brechin as a member of the coaching staff, assisting Ian Fleming when the club won Scottish Division Two in the early 1980s and becoming manager later in the same decade. Winning Division Two in the 1989–90 season, Ritchie left in 1993 to take up a coaching position with Hibernian and moved to a similar role with Dunfermline Athletic in 1999. Made redundant from East End Park in April 2004, and later linked with the vacant Arbroath job, Ritchie returned briefly to Glebe Park in 2004–05 in a coaching capacity.

Ritchie was on the coaching staff at Scottish Junior club Thornton Hibs and helped the club to the semi-finals of the Scottish Junior Cup in 2008. He then ran his own coaching school, JR-Coaching. Ritchie died in June 2018, aged 70.
