= Frank Sandeman =

Scottish footballer and manager

Personal information
- Date of birth: 28 August 1936
- Place of birth: Dundee, Scotland
- Date of death: 23 November 2018 (aged 82)
- Place of death: Dundee, Scotland
- Height: 5 ft 5 in (1.65 m)
- Position: Inside forward

Youth career
- Dundee St. Joseph's

Senior career*
Years	Team	Apps	(Gls)
1956–1962	Montrose		
1962–1963	East Stirlingshire		
1963–1965	Heart of Midlothian	5	(0)
1965–1966	Arbroath		
1966–1971	Brechin City		
- Dundee St. Joseph's

Managerial career
- 1970–1971: Brechin City
- * Club domestic league appearances and goals

Frank Sandeman (born 28 August 1936) was a Scottish football player and manager, who played as an inside forward for Heart of Midlothian.
