= Frank Conway =

Scottish footballer (born 1979)

Personal information
- Date of birth: 20 December 1969 (age 56)
- Place of birth: Dundee, Scotland
- Position: Defender

Youth career
- Lochee Harp

Senior career*
Years	Team	Apps	(Gls)
1989–1997	Brechin	200	(7)
1997–1999	Livingston	44	(2)
1999	Airdrieonians	10	(0)
1999–2001	Alloa	35	(3)
2001–2004	Montrose	46	(3)
- Lochee Harp

Managerial career
- Tayport
- Lochee Harp
- * Club domestic league appearances and goals

Frank Conway (born 20 December 1969) is a Scottish former footballer who played as a defender for Airdrieonians and Livingston.

== Career ==
=== Playing career ===
Conway started his career at Lochee Harp before earning a move to Brechin. He went on to make 200 appearances for the City before making a move to Livingston.

He joined Livi at an exciting time after considerable investment was being spent on the playing squad, which saw several seasoned pro's with league experience joining the club, like Allan Moore, Steve Maskrey and Derek Fleming. Conway made 44 appearances and scored 2 goals for Livingston.

Following his departure from Livi, Conway signed for Airdrieonians in 1999. His spell at the Diamonds was a short one, with half of his 10 appearances for the club were coming off the bench. In the winter transfer window, he departed for Alloa.

Conway turned out 35 times for the Wasps, scoring 3 times during his time at Recreation Park.

His last move in professional football was to Montrose in 2001. Conway added some defensive strength to an ambitious Gable Endies side, which included the experienced Ray McKinnon.

Having moved into the junior leagues to rejoin his first club Lochee Harp, Conway retired from playing.

=== Managerial career ===
Conway had spells as manager of Tayport and Lochee Harp. He left the Harp in 2015.
