= 2000–01 Scottish First Division =

Scottish First Division
- Season: 2000–01
- Champions: Livingston
- Promoted: Livingston
- Relegated: Greenock Morton; Alloa Athletic
- Top goalscorer: Dennis Wyness (25)

The 2000–01 Scottish First Division was won by Livingston who were promoted to the Scottish Premier League. Greenock Morton and Alloa Athletic were relegated to the Second Division.

== League table ==
Pos	Team	Pld	W	D	L	GF	GA	GD	Pts	Promotion or relegation
1	Livingston (C, P)	36	23	7	6	72	31	+41	76	Promotion to the Premier League
2	Ayr United	36	19	12	5	73	41	+32	69	
3	Falkirk	36	16	8	12	57	59	−2	56	
4	Inverness CT	36	14	12	10	71	54	+17	54	
5	Clyde	36	11	14	11	44	46	−2	47	
6	Ross County	36	11	10	15	48	52	−4	43	
7	Raith Rovers	36	10	8	18	41	55	−14	38	
8	Airdrieonians	36	8	14	14	49	67	−18	38	
9	Greenock Morton (R)	36	9	8	19	34	61	−27	35	Relegation to the Second Division
10	Alloa Athletic (R)	36	7	11	18	38	61	−23	32	Relegation to the Second Division

Source: "2000-2001 First Division - SPFL Archive". SPFL.
Rules for classification: 1) points; 2) goal difference; 3) number of goals scored.
(C) Champions; (P) Promoted; (R) Relegated

== Attendances ==
The average attendances for Scottish First Division clubs for season 2000/01 are shown below:

Club	Average
Livingston	3,624
Ross County	2,817
Falkirk	2,499
Ayr United	2,411
Inverness CT	2,132
Raith Rovers	1,791
Airdrieonians	1,724
Clyde	1,466
Greenock Morton	1,314
Alloa Athletic	933
