= Sandy Hodge (footballer) =

Scottish footballer (born 1980)

Personal information
- Date of birth: 4 October 1980 (age 46)
- Position: Defender

Youth career
- 1998–1999: Motherwell

Senior career*
Years	Team	Apps	(Gls)
1999–2000	Queen of the South	33	(1)
2000–2003	Stranraer	56	(3)
2003	Queen of the South	0	(0)
2003–2006	Hamilton	77	(1)
2006–2007	Partick Thistle	14	(1)
2006–2007	→ Stranraer (loan)	7	(0)
2007–2008	Alloa	14	(0)
2008–2009	Cowdenbeath	12	(0)
- * Club domestic league appearances and goals

Sandy Hodge (born 4 October 1980) is a Scottish former footballer.

== Career ==
Hodge's career began as a Youth player at Scottish Premier League side Motherwell, but he did not make up a senior appearance during the one season in which he was at the club. He moved to Scottish Football League Second Division side Queen of the South in time for the beginning of the 1999-2000 season, and made his league debut in a defeat against Partick Thistle in August 1999.

The final day of Hodge's 1999-2000 season saw his team fall to a 6–1 away defeat by future club Alloa Athletic, meaning that Queen of the South finished the season in ninth place, while Alloa were promoted to Division One. Halfway through the following season, Hodge moved to Stranraer, for whom he made his debut in November 2000. He played eight further league fixtures during the 2000–01 season and one cup fixture, a defeat by Scottish Premier League champions Celtic.

Stranraer finished in fourth place in the table in the 2000–01 season. The following season they made it through to the third round of the FA Cup, while their Challenge Cup campaign saw them fall at the first hurdle. Hodge scored two of his three goals in this stint for Stranraer during the 2001–02 season.

Queen of the South signed Hodge for a second time on an emergency basis for a single game at the beginning of the 2003–04 season, a Scottish League Challenge Cup match against Stranraer which finished in a 2–1 defeat thanks to two goals from Michael Moore. He then signed for Hamilton Academical. Hamilton's season, despite the team failing badly in 2002–03, went much smoother upon the arrival of some fresh players, as Hamilton were promoted from Division Two at the end of the 2003–04 season, undefeated in their last eight games of the season.

2004–05 was a return to poor form amongst stronger opponents, and Hamilton were to be knocked out of the League Cup in the second round, and it was only thanks to a late charge at the end of the season that they avoided relegation at the expense of Partick Thistle. Hodge left Hamilton halfway through the 2005–06 season, playing his final game in a 5–4 away defeat against Stranraer, on Boxing Day 2005.

Hodge dropped a division, making his debut for Second Division Partick Thistle as a substitute for David Craig in a 6–1 defeat against Gretna in January 2006. Partick finished the 2005–06 season 4th in the Second Division, qualifying for the First Division play-offs, which they won and were promoted to Division 1 in place of Stranraer.

From here on Hodge barely played for Partick, making just nine first-team starts, and leaving the team just prior to the end of the 2006–07 season, having completed a two-month loan to old club Stranraer in their struggle against relegation. Hodge decided to seek the possibility of playing first-team football elsewhere, and signed for Alloa Athletic at the beginning of the 2007–08 season. Hodge made his debut for Alloa against Cowdenbeath as a substitute in a 3–2 victory in September 2007.
