= Scottish Football League First Division =

- Founded: 1975; 1893–1946 (as Division Two); 1946–1956 (as Division B); 1956–1975 (as Division Two)
- Folded: 2013
- Country: Scotland
- Number of clubs: 10
- Level on pyramid: 2
- Promotion to: Scottish Premier League
- Relegation to: Scottish Second Division
- Domestic cup(s): SFA Cup; SFL Cup; SFL Challenge Cup
- Last champions: Partick Thistle (2012–13)
- Most championships: Falkirk (7); St Johnstone (7) (since 1893)
- Website: Official site

The Scottish Football League First Division was the second tier in the Scottish football league system between 1975 and 2013. It was replaced by the Scottish Championship.

== History ==
The First Division was introduced in 1975–76 to replace the old Scottish Football League Division Two, as the top flight of the Scottish Football League was renamed from Division One to Premier Division.

In 1998, the Premier Division clubs broke away from the Scottish Football League to form the Scottish Premier League. The First Division remained the second tier of the Scottish league system, but was now the top tier of the Scottish Football League. In July 2013, the Scottish Football League and Scottish Premier League merged to form the Scottish Professional Football League (SPFL). The SPFL named its second tier as the Scottish Championship, which effectively replaced the First Division.

== Competition ==
From 1994 until 2013, the First Division consisted of ten teams. From 1998, only the winner of the First Division was promoted to the Scottish Premier League (SPL), subject to that club meeting the SPL stadium criteria. From 2007, the bottom club in the First Division was automatically relegated to the Second Division and the second bottom club went into an end of season play-off with the second, third and fourth placed clubs in the Second Division.

The ten teams in the First Division played each other four times with three points for a victory and one point each for a drawn game.

== Winners of the First Division ==
Season	Winner	Runner-up
1998–99	Hibernian	Falkirk
1999–00	St Mirren	Dunfermline Athletic
2000–01	Livingston	Ayr United
2001–02	Partick Thistle	Airdrieonians
2002–03	Falkirk	Clyde
2003–04	Inverness Caledonian Thistle	Clyde
2004–05	Falkirk (2)	St Mirren
2005–06	St Mirren (2)	St Johnstone
2006–07	Gretna	St Johnstone
2007–08	Hamilton Academical	Dundee
2008–09	St Johnstone	Partick Thistle
2009–10	Inverness Caledonian Thistle (2)	Dundee
2010–11	Dunfermline Athletic	Raith Rovers
2011–12	Ross County	Dundee
2012–13	Partick Thistle (2)	Greenock Morton

== See also ==
- Sports league attendances
- Scottish Championship
