= Martín Prest =

Argentine footballer (born 1978)

Personal information
- Full name: Martín Hugo Prest
- Date of birth: November 30, 1978 (age 47)
- Place of birth: Mar del Plata, Argentina
- Height: 1.85 m (6 ft 1 in)
- Position: Striker

Senior career*
Years	Team	Apps	(Gls)
1998–1999	Banfield	-	
1999–2000	Manchego	-	
2000	Dundee	-	
2000–2001	Airdrieonians	18	(4)
2001–2002	Ross County	16	(4)
2002–2004	Raith Rovers	35	(4)
2004	Collado Villalba	0	(0)
2005	L'Escala	0	(0)
2005–2006	Atlètic Ciutadella	0	(0)
2005–2006	Nuorese	4	(1)
2006–2007	Marítimo	1	(0)
2007–2008	Burgos	2	(0)
2008	Dénia		
2008–2011	Pinatar		
2011–2012	Atletico Vieste		

Managerial career
- 2013–: Johor Darul Ta'zim (sporting director)
- * Club domestic league appearances and goals

Martín Prest is a former Argentine football striker. He was born on November 30, 1978, in the city of Mar del Plata in the Buenos Aires Province of Argentina. He last played for Atletico Vieste before retiring.

Prest played for a selection of lower league teams in Scotland and Spain before joining Marítimo in 2006.

Prest is currently the sporting director of the Malaysia Super League club, Johor Darul Ta'zim and has been at the club since 2013.

== Honours ==
Airdrieonians

- Scottish Challenge Cup: 2000–01
