= Mark McCormick (footballer, born 1979) =

Scottish footballer (born 1979)

Personal information
- Date of birth: 11 July 1979 (age 47)
- Place of birth: Bellshill, Scotland
- Position: Midfielder

Team information
- Current team: FK Austria Wien (assistant manager)

Senior career*
Years	Team	Apps	(Gls)
- Harthill Royal
1998–2001	Livingston	65	(11)
2001–2002	Ross County	37	(4)
2002–2004	Berwick Rangers	7	(0)
2005–2010	NYU Violets		
2011	DSG Vienna Internationals		
2011–2012	SV Schwechat		
2014	USC Pilgersdorf		

Managerial career
- 2016: Northern Spirit
- 2016–2017: Northern Tigers
- 2022–: FK Austria Wien (assistant manager)
- * Club domestic league appearances and goals

Mark McCormick (born 11 July 1979) is a Scottish former professional footballer who played as a midfielder for Berwick Rangers and Livingston.

== Club career ==
McCormick started his career with East of Scotland Football League side Harthill Royal before earning a move to then Scottish Football League Second Division side Livingston in 1998. He scored on his league debut for Livi in a 1–1 draw against Stirling Albion.

He signed for Ross County in 2001 and made 37 appearances for the Staggies before leaving for Berwick Rangers in 2002.

His last game for the Wee Gers would also be his last professional game in Scotland. He signed off with an assist in a 1–1 draw against Airdrieonians.

The midfielder had spells playing in USA with NYU Violets and Austria with DSG Vienna Internationals, USC Pilgersdorf and SV Schwechat before retiring in 2014.

== Coaching career ==
McCormick moved into coaching and was appointed as FK Austria Wien U15 assistant manager in 2010, combining this with playing club football at the same time.

In 2015, he was heading abroad again. This time to Australia to become a youth coach at Northern Tigers. He then moved into management with short tints with Western Spirit and Northern Tigers.

McCormick was then appointed as Chief Instructor at Sunderland by then manager Simon Grayson. In what was a turbulent time at the Black Cats which saw a high turnover of managers, McCormick left the club after less than a year and returned to the familiar surroundings of Austria to become U18 assistant manager at FK Austria Wien.

Since then, he has managed the U16 and U18 squads of FK Austria Wien before being appointed first team assistant manager in 2022.
