= David McGuire =

Scottish footballer (born 1980)

Personal information
- Date of birth: 27 September 1980 (age 46)
- Place of birth: Bellshill, Scotland
- Height: 5 ft 7 in (1.70 m)
- Position: Winger

Team information
- Current team: Lanark United

Youth career
- Airdrie Boys Club

Senior career*
| Years | Team | Apps | (Gls) |
| 1999–2001 | Airdrieonians | 35 | (2) |
| 2001 | Dundee United | 0 | (0) |
| 2001–2002 | Livingston | 0 | (0) |
| 2002–2003 | Airdrie United | 18 | (1) |
- Thomas University
- Cumbernauld United
| 2007 | Airdrie United | 6 | (0) |
| 2007–2008 | Cumbernauld United | | |
| 2008– | Lanark United | | |
- * Club domestic league appearances and goals as of 1 July 2007 (UTC)

David McGuire (born 27 September 1980 in Bellshill) is a Scottish footballer who plays for junior club Lanark United. His previous senior clubs include Airdrie United.

== Career ==
In late March 2000, McGuire was - like other players - allowed to leave due to Airdrie's uncertain future and he, along with Darren Brady, signed for Dundee United until the end of the season. The pair saw little action with United, with only Brady making a substitute appearance in the final game of the season and both players moved on to Livingston in the summer. McGuire spent a season at Almondvale before moving to newly formed Airdrie United, where he spent five seasons.

McGuire left the club in the summer of 2007 and moved into junior football.

== Honours ==
Airdrieonians

- Scottish Challenge Cup: 2000–01
