= Andy Kane (footballer) =

Scottish footballer

Personal information
- Full name: Andrew Kane
- Date of birth: 7 December 1976 (age 49)
- Place of birth: Paisley, Scotland
- Height: 6 ft 0 in (1.83 m)
- Position: Striker

Senior career*
Years	Team	Apps	(Gls)
1998–2000	Rutherglen Glencairn		
2000–2002	Clyde	45	(7)
2002–2003	Stranraer	14	(1)
2003	Ryde City	7	(2)
2003–2005	Parramatta Eagles	22	(4)
- * Club domestic league appearances and goals as of 16:47, 8 January 2009 (UTC)

Andrew Kane (born 7 December 1976 in Paisley), is a Scottish football striker. He last played with Parramatta Eagles in 2005.

Kane began his career with junior side Rutherglen Glencairn. He made the step up to the senior game in the summer of 2000, signing for Clyde. He finished top scorer in his first season at Broadwood Stadium, with a tally of 9 goals. Injuries hampered his time at Clyde, and he joined Stranraer in August 2002. He spent a season at Stair Park, before moving to Australia to play with Ryde City then Parramatta Eagles.
