= Derek Fleming =

Scottish footballer (born 1973)

Personal information
- Date of birth: 5 December 1973 (age 52)
- Place of birth: Falkirk, Scotland
- Position: Defender

Senior career*
| Years | Team | Apps | (Gls) |
| ?-1992 | Broxburn Athletic | | |
| 1993–1994 | Meadowbank Thistle | 49 | (3) |
| 1994–1997 | Dunfermline Athletic | 91 | (6) |
| 1997–1998 | Dundee | 18 | (0) |
| 1998 | → Livingston (loan) | 9 | (2) |
| 1998–2001 | Livingston | 68 | (7) |
| 2001–2005 | Partick Thistle | 98 | (9) |
| 2005–2006 | Hamilton Academical | 38 | (2) |
| 2007–2008 | Alloa Athletic | 22 | (0) |
| 2008–2009 | Cowdenbeath | 24 | (0) |
| 2009–2011 | Bo'ness United | | |
| 2011–2015 | Linlithgow Rose | | |
| Total | | 417 | (29) |
- * Club domestic league appearances and goals as of 21:10, 31 March 2009 (UTC)

Derek Adam Fleming (born 5 December 1973 in Falkirk) is a Scottish former football defender.

== Early life ==
He attended The James Young High School in Livingston, West Lothian.

== Playing career ==
Fleming began his career in 1993 with Meadowbank Thistle, where he made a total of 49 appearances before moving to Dunfermline Athletic in 1994. He has also played for Dundee, Livingston, Partick Thistle and Hamilton Academical. In the 2006–2007 season with Hamilton injury restricted him to only 19 first team appearances. He signed for Alloa Athletic under freedom of contract as manager Allan Maitland built a new squad for the 2007–08 season. He was released in May 2008.

Flea was an integral part of the Partick Thistle side that won the first division, playing both in midfield and at left back, he will be best remembered by jags fans as scoring the goal at Love Street that secured promotion to the Scottish Premier League. Flea also broke his leg in the process. Derek is now a player/coach for Linlithgow Rose.
