= Antonio Calderón =

Spanish footballer and manager (born 1967)

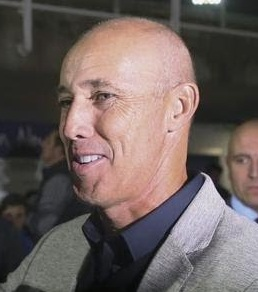
- Calderón as manager of Fuenlabrada in 2017

Personal information
- Full name: Antonio Calderón Burgos
- Date of birth: 2 June 1967 (age 59)
- Place of birth: Cádiz, Spain
- Height: 1.79 m (5 ft 10 in)
- Position: Attacking midfielder

Senior career*
Years	Team	Apps	(Gls)
1986–1989	Cádiz	47	(2)
1989–1991	Mallorca	62	(4)
1991–1996	Rayo Vallecano	175	(27)
1996–2000	Lleida	130	(16)
2000–2001	Airdrie	24	(2)
2001–2002	Kilmarnock	24	(1)
2002–2004	Raith Rovers	50	(3)
Total		512	(55)

International career
1987	Spain U21	1	(0)

Managerial career
- 2002–2004: Raith Rovers
- 2004–2005: Cádiz (youth)
- 2005–2007: Cádiz B
- 2007–2008: Cádiz
- 2008–2010: Huesca
- 2010–2011: Albacete
- 2011–2012: Tenerife
- 2012: Huesca
- 2014: Cádiz
- 2016–2018: Fuenlabrada
- 2018: Nogoom
- 2018–2019: Salamanca
- 2019–2021: Linense
- 2021–2022: Salamanca
- 2022: Deinze (assistant)
- 2022: Deinze (caretaker)
- 2023–2026: Juventud Torremolinos
- * Club domestic league appearances and goals

Antonio Calderón Burgos (born 2 June 1967) is a Spanish former professional footballer who played as an attacking midfielder. He is a current manager.

Over eight seasons, he amassed La Liga totals of 213 games and 18 goals, for Cádiz, Mallorca and Rayo Vallecano. He added 201 appearances in the Segunda División, in a career that lasted 18 years and ended in Scotland.

Calderón started a managerial career in the 2000s, working in both countries and with several teams.

== Playing career ==
Born in Cádiz, Andalusia, Calderón made his senior and La Liga debut with hometown's Cádiz CF, in the 1986–87 season. In 1989, he signed with RCD Mallorca also in the top division, spending two years there.

Calderón then joined Madrid's Rayo Vallecano, helping the team promote from the Segunda División in his debut campaign with a career-best nine goals in 36 games; during his spell with the club, he would experience one relegation and another promotion. He finished his career in Spain with UE Lleida of the second division, eventually amassing totals of 416 matches and 49 goals across the two major tiers of Spanish football.

Aged 33, Calderón moved abroad, playing half a season with Airdrieonians and one and a half with Kilmarnock, his debut for the latter being a start against Dunfermline Athletic (2–1 home win) and his first and only goal occurring in a 3–1 away loss to Rangers. In 2002 he stayed in Scotland, retiring at Raith Rovers where he acted as player-coach.

== Coaching career ==
Calderón continued his coaching career in his country, first briefly managing first professional club Cádiz as it was not finally able to prevent division-two relegation. He then signed with SD Huesca, recently promoted to precisely that league. With him in charge for the full campaign, they finished in a comfortable 11th position.

In 2009–10, Calderón repeated the feat; 13th place, although only two points clear of the relegation zone. In July 2010 he moved to another side in the second tier, Albacete Balompié. In February of the following year, with the Castilla–La Mancha team ranking 19th out of 22, eventually suffering relegation, he was fired.

In July 2011, Calderón signed for CD Tenerife in the third division. On 22 January of the following year, following a 2–3 home defeat against Sporting de Gijón B, he was relieved of his duties, as the Canarians were ultimately not promoted.

For 2012–13, Calderón returned to Huesca which was still in the second tier. He was sacked after a 4–0 loss at UD Las Palmas in December, and the club eventually dropped down to the third division after a five-year stay.

Calderón succeeded Raül Agné at third-tier Cádiz CF in March 2014. After taking them to the playoffs (eliminated by CE L'Hospitalet) his contract was renewed for another year in June. However, he was dismissed as soon as November for a poor run of results.

In October 2016, Calderón was appointed at CF Fuenlabrada of the third league after Josip Višnjić was fired. He again took the team from the Madrid outskirts to the post-season – 2–0 aggregate quarter-final loss to CF Villanovense – and was sacked in January 2018 after a ten-game winless run, despite still being in third place.

Calderon moved to Egyptian Premier League newcomers Nogoom FC in August 2018. He left Giza for personal reasons in September, and in October he was back in his country's third division with Salamanca CF UDS. A day after saving the side from the drop with a 12th-place finish, he resigned in May 2019.

On 16 December 2019, Calderón joined Real Balompédica Linense also in the third tier. He left on a mutual agreement in May 2021, after qualifying them for Primera División RFEF.

== Managerial statistics ==
As of 4 April 2026

Managerial record by team and tenure
Team	Nat	From	To	Record								Ref
Team	Nat	From	To	G	W	D	L	GF	GA	GD	Win %	Ref
Raith Rovers	(Scotland)	3 June 2002	15 June 2004	85	29	23	33	107	114	−7	34.12	
Cádiz B	(Spain)	21 March 2005	10 October 2007	92	39	19	34	124	114	+10	42.39	
Cádiz	(Spain)	10 October 2007	6 April 2008	25	8	8	9	26	25	+1	32.00	
Huesca	(Spain)	27 June 2008	1 July 2010	87	25	31	31	84	91	−7	28.74	
Albacete	(Spain)	1 July 2010	13 February 2011	25	5	8	12	17	30	−13	20.00	
Tenerife	(Spain)	8 July 2011	22 January 2012	22	9	8	5	30	19	+11	40.91	
Huesca	(Spain)	8 August 2012	11 December 2012	19	4	8	7	18	25	−7	21.05	
Cádiz	(Spain)	19 March 2014	24 November 2014	27	14	10	3	49	23	+26	51.85	
Fuenlabrada	(Spain)	25 October 2016	8 April 2018	77	35	22	20	106	71	+35	45.45	
Nogoom	(Egypt)	3 August 2018	14 September 2018	4	1	1	2	5	8	−3	25.00	
Salamanca	(Spain)	7 October 2018	20 May 2019	31	11	11	9	33	27	+6	35.48	
Linense	(Spain)	17 December 2019	17 May 2021	36	15	12	9	38	34	+4	41.67	
Salamanca	(Spain)	7 July 2021	15 February 2022	19	4	6	9	6	14	−8	21.05	
Deinze (caretaker)	(Belgium)	30 September 2022	24 October 2022	4	1	0	3	4	6	−2	25.00	
Juventud Torremolinos	(Spain)	16 March 2023	6 April 2026	110	54	30	26	166	109	+57	49.09	
Total				663	254	197	212	813	710	+103	38.31	—

== Honours ==
Airdrieonians

- Scottish Challenge Cup: 2000–01

Raith Rovers

- Scottish Football League Second Division: 2002–03
- Fife Cup: 2003–04
