= John Anderson (footballer, born 1972) =

Scottish footballer and coach

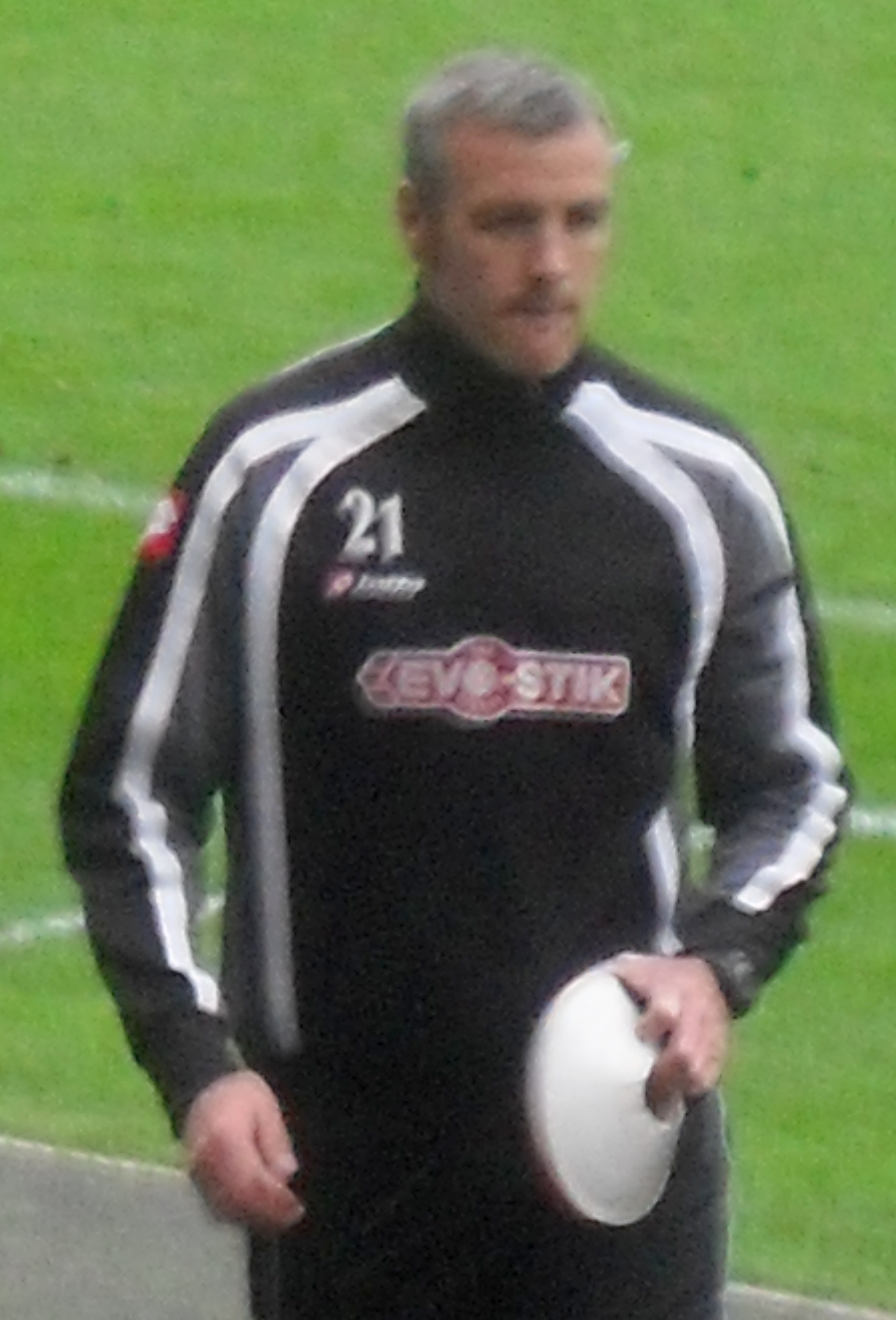
- Anderson pictured in 2011

Personal information
- Full name: John Patton Anderson
- Date of birth: 2 October 1972 (age 54)
- Place of birth: Greenock, Scotland
- Position: Defender

Youth career
- ?–1993: Gourock YAC

Senior career*
Years	Team	Apps	(Gls)
1993–2000	Greenock Morton	205	(28)
2000–2002	Livingston	41	(3)
2002–2003	Hull City	43	(1)
2003–2006	Bristol Rovers	54	(2)
Total		343	(34)

Managerial career
- 2010–2011: North Ferriby United
- * Club domestic league appearances and goals

John Patton Anderson (born 2 October 1972) is a Scottish football coach and former player, who played as a defender. He had been the under-18s manager at Leeds United. He was manager at North Ferriby United between 2010 and 2011.

== Playing career ==
Anderson played the majority of his career in Scotland with Greenock Morton and Livingston, before finishing his career in England with Hull City and Bristol Rovers.

== Coaching career ==
He took over as manager of Northern Premier League Premier Division club North Ferriby United in October 2010, having been assistant manager since 2007. He resigned from this post less than a year later on 11 September 2011, after a turbulent start to the 2011–12 season. After leaving North Ferriby he joined his former club, Hull City, in November 2013 he was appointed as lead youth development coach looking after the U12s to the U16s.

In August 2015, Anderson joined Daral Pugh from Hull City in joining Championship rivals, Leeds United, with Anderson becoming Leeds' under-18's manager.

On 24 June 2016, Anderson left his role as inder-18s manager at Leeds United as part of Leeds' academy re-structuring.
