= Brechin City F.C. =

Association football club in Scotland

Brechin City
- Full name: Brechin City Football Club
- Nicknames: The City; The Hedgemen
- Founded: 1906; 120 years ago
- Ground: Glebe Park, Brechin
- Capacity: 4,123 (1,519 seated)
- Coordinates: 56.735272°N 2.65651°W
- Chairman: Kevin Mackie
- Manager: Andy Kirk
- League: Lowland League East
- 2025–26: Highland League, 2nd of 18
- Website: www.brechincity.com
Home colours	Away colours

Brechin City Football Club is a Scottish football club based in the town (Note: Despite the name of the football club, Brechin is not an official city. Brechin was historically known as a city because it has a cathedral.) of Brechin in Angus. The club was founded in 1906 by players and officials of two local clubs, Brechin Harp and Brechin Hearts. The club currently competes in the Lowland League East after suffering three relegations in four seasons: from the Championship in 2018, League One in 2019, and League Two in 2021 following a 3–1 aggregate play-off defeat by Kelty Hearts.

The club's highest achievements include winning the third tier of Scottish football three times, most recently in 2004–05 as champions of the Second Division. The club has also reached the final of the Scottish Challenge Cup on one occasion, losing 2–0 to Queen of the South in 2002. Brechin's home ground is Glebe Park which can seat around 1,500 spectators in its capacity of 4,123. The ground opened in 1919.

== History ==
=== Early years ===
The club was founded in 1906 by players and officials from two comparatively successful local junior sides – Brechin Harp and Brechin Hearts. A deputation from the Forfarshire Football Association had met with representatives of the local game at the Temperance Hall in City Road and managed to persuade them that Brechin would benefit from having a single senior club. Although Brechin Harp folded with the establishment of the senior side, Brechin Hearts continued as a viable and successful Junior side until the years of the Great War.

The club won its first important local honour, the Forfarshire Cup, in the 1909–10 season with a side that featured nine players from the town. The club moved to their Glebe Park home in 1919, a stadium which currently has a capacity of 4,123 (1,519 seated) and is famous for the hedge that runs alongside one side of the pitch.

=== Joining the league ===
The team was admitted to the Scottish league in 1923 with the formation of the original Third Division. However, City struggled, finishing bottom of the League in that first season. The club failed to make any headway in the doomed division and disappeared from the Scottish League at the end of the 1925–26 season along with most of the other teams in the division.

The club was not away long, as it returned to the League for the 1929–30 season following the departure of Bathgate and Arthurlie the previous season. Once again the club finished rock bottom. The club continued to struggle in the bottom half of the Second Division throughout the 1930s before going into hibernation during the Second World War. Indeed, so poor was the club at times that during the 1937–38 season the club were beaten 10–0 by Cowdenbeath, Albion Rovers and Airdrieonians.

=== Post-war return ===
Brechin City returned to action in the 1946–47 season in the C Division, a competition which did not have full membership of the Scottish Football League and which contained a mix of first teams and reserve sides. The club remained in this set-up until its success in the North-East section (the division having been restructured into two separate competitions) in the 1953–54 season saw it return to full League membership. Their first season back however resulted in another bottom placed finish, although it was not relegated. Despite this shaky return the club enjoyed a halcyon period of sorts in the late 1950s, securing four consecutive top half finishes (without managing to clinch promotion) as well as reaching the semi-finals of the 1957–58 Scottish League Cup.

The 1960s, however, saw the club struggling again, with yet another bottom place its fate for the 1961–62 season and again the following season with a further two wooden spoon efforts before the end of the decade. The unwanted feat of finishing bottom two years in a row was repeated in 1972–73 and 1973–74 as Brechin City continued to be one of the weakest sides in Scottish League football.

=== New Second Division ===
The club finished 17th out of 20 in the 1974–75 season and as such was placed in the new Division Two, which was the third tier of the restructured League. The new set-up suited the club little better as they remained in and around the bottom. However a mid-table 1979–80 season ushered in something of a change in fortune as the club began to challenge for its first promotion as full League members. With both a new stand and floodlighting added to Glebe Park, the club played with a new ambition until finally breaking its duck with a title win in the 1982–83 season. Under the chairmanship of David Will, the then Scottish Football Association vice-president and a future vice-president of FIFA, and the player-management of ex-Dundee stalwart Ian Fleming, the club pipped Meadowbank Thistle to the title by one point.

=== The 1980s ===
Under Will's progressive leadership City found its feet in the First Division and challenged near the top in the 1983–84 season before finishing in a creditable fifth place. However 1986–87 season saw the club narrowly relegated ahead of Queen of the South although undaunted it challenged at the top of the Second Division before winning the title for the second time in 1989–90 season again by one point, this time ahead of Kilmarnock.

=== The 1990s ===
Brechin's return to the First Division was to prove somewhat inauspicious as it was immediately relegated, although 1992–93 season saw it promoted again, this time as runners-up. Again, however, it was relegated immediately and worse was to follow as it suffered consecutive demotions, dropping into the newly created Third Division, the fourth tier of League football. However once again there was an immediate change as the club finished second in this division for the 1995–96 season, ensuring promotion and five changes of division in five frantic seasons. The club was relegated again after two seasons and finished the decade back in the bottom division.

=== The 2000s ===
In the new millennium the club experienced a revival in fortune under Dick Campbell, winning the Third Division in 2001–02 season after a narrow miss the previous season. The push continued the following season as the club finished runners-up to secure a second consecutive promotion with Chris Templeman bagging 21 League goals for the club in a season in which it was also beaten Scottish Challenge Cup finalists. However the First Division proved too much for the part-timers as they were immediately relegated. However the topsy-turvy existence of Brechin City continued as the following season it again won the Second Division title, although success was soured by the departure of Campbell to Partick Thistle. Without Campbell the team struggled even more than before in the First Division and managed only two wins all season on its way to relegation under Ian Campbell, the twin brother of their previous manager. The mood was lifted somewhat by the club's centenary celebrations which included a 2–2 draw in a prestige friendly against English Championship side Ipswich Town at Glebe Park.

The club, led by the management of Michael O'Neill and with the goal threat of Iain Russell, finished fourth in the following season's Second Division and under new arrangements this entitled it to a place in promotion play-offs, although a 6–1 aggregate mauling at the hands of Airdrie United put paid to any hopes of another immediate return to the second tier. 2007–08 proved somewhat disappointing as City missed out on the play-offs by finishing sixth, and on 31 January 2008, was thrown out of the Scottish Cup after fielding two ineligible players in its 2–1 fourth round replay win over Hamilton Academical. Hamilton Academical took their place in the fifth round. 2008–09 proved a season of upheaval as O'Neill left on 15 December 2008 to take charge of Republic of Ireland side Shamrock Rovers, although the experienced Jim Duffy followed him into the hotseat on 9 January 2009 and led the club to third place and a play-off place. Once again however the play-offs did not prove rewarding as Ayr United recorded a 5–2 aggregate win over the club to leave Brechin City in the Second Division for 2009–10. Under Duffy, Brechin made the play-offs again the following season but Duffy resigned after Brechin were beaten 3–0 on aggregate by Cowdenbeath.

=== The 2010s ===
For the 2010–11 season the club appointed Jim Weir as manager, departing Arbroath at short notice after leading them to relegation. That season, Brechin reached the quarter-finals of the Scottish Cup, drawing 2–2 with SPL side St Johnstone at Glebe Park, resulting in a replay which City eventually lost 1–0 after a valiant effort.

On 14 May 2011, Brechin beat Cowdenbeath 4–2 on aggregate, in the 1st Division play-offs semi-final, to set up a final with Ayr United, in which the victors secured First Division football for season 2011–12. In the first leg at Somerset Park the match ended 1–1 however Ayr won the second leg at Glebe Park 2–1 meaning that Brechin stayed in the Second Division.

The club appointed Forfar Athletic defender Darren Dods as player/manager in June 2015. Dods' first season with the club saw Brechin remain rooted to the bottom of League One for the majority of the 2015–16 season, winning just four of their first twenty-six matches. However, a late burst of form saw the club win eight of the final ten games, pushing the side clear of the relegation and play-off positions to finish the season in seventh. Dods' second season was in stark contrast to the first, with Brechin remaining in the top four for most of the season 2016–17. Finishing the season in fourth, the club then went on to win promotion to the Scottish Championship for the first time in 11 years, defeating Raith Rovers and Alloa Athletic in the Championship play-offs.

=== Back to back relegations ===
Brechin's return to the second tier proved short lived; having not won a league match and with four points, the club were relegated on 24 March 2018 following a 2–0 loss to Greenock Morton.

Brechin ended their Championship campaign with a 1–5 loss to Queen of the South at Glebe Park. This meant the club became the first senior Scottish side in 126 years to fail to win a single game in a league season. Brechin ended the 2017–18 season with no wins, four draws, 32 defeats and no away points at all.

Brechin went into the 2018–2019 season as favourites for promotion; however they ended up in yet another relegation battle which resulted in the club finishing bottom of League One and back to back relegations.

The 2019–20 season again turned into a battle to stay off the foot of the table and dodge a play-off that could result in relegation to the Highland League. The club were at the bottom of League Two when the league was suspended due to the COVID-19 pandemic, and avoided the play-offs due to the league eventually being curtailed.

=== Out of the SPFL ===
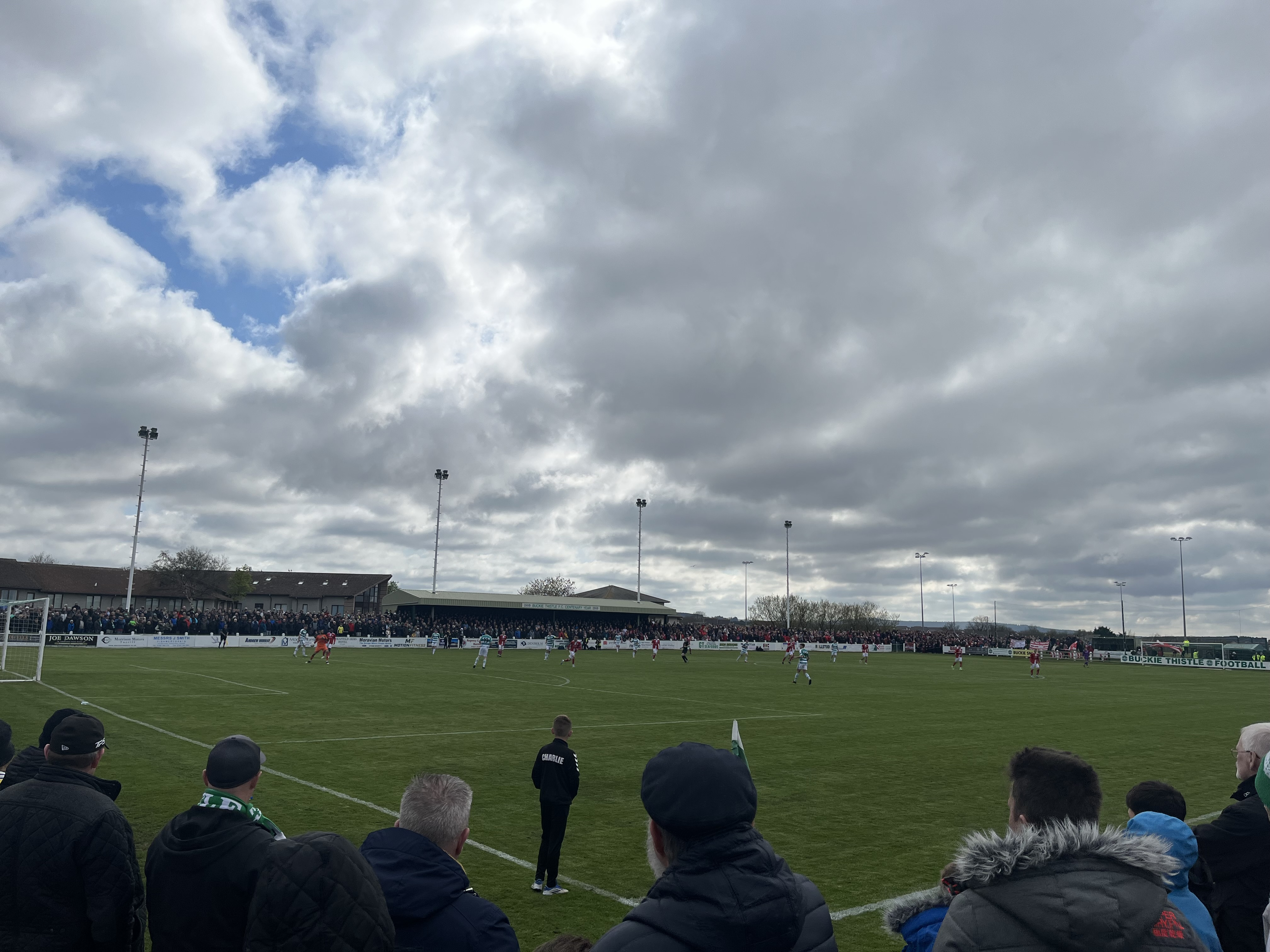
Buckie Thistle F.C. vs Brechin City F.C. in title deciding match at Victoria Park, Buckie 22nd April 2023

On 23 May 2021, Brechin lost 3–1 on aggregate to Lowland League side Kelty Hearts in the relegation playoffs, dropping down to the Highland League, the club's first spell out of the national leagues in 67 years. In June 2021, after the departure of player/manager Michael Paton, the club appointed Andy Kirk to the role of club manager. In the club's first season in the Highland League, they secured a respectable third-place finish.

The following season, they won the title after beating closest challengers, Buckie Thistle, 0–2 on the final day of the campaign.

On 6 May 2023, Brechin were defeated 3–4 on penalties by Lowland League outfit The Spartans in the pyramid play-offs. They headed into the 2nd leg with a 1–0 deficit to turn around, despite winning the game 3–2 and making it 3–3 on aggregate; they fell short in the penalty shootout.

The 2023-24 Season saw Brechin and Buckie Thistle the front runners for the title. The season came down to the final day for the 2nd year in a row. At the end of the campaign, Brechin were beaten to the title by rivals Buckie Thistle on goal difference, after both teams claimed 81 points for the season. Buckie Thistle were due to compete in the pyramid play-offs but were ineligible due to licensing issues.

== Rivalries ==
Brechin share several rivalries with clubs from Angus, such as Arbroath, Forfar Athletic and Montrose, and contests between them are known as Angus derbies.

== Recent managers ==
- Frank Sandeman (1970–1971)
- Bobby Methven (1971–1972)
- Ken Dick (1972–1974)
- Charlie Dunn (1974–1978)
- Ian Stewart (1978–1979)
- Doug Houston (1979–1982)
- Ian Fleming (1982–1987)
- John Ritchie (1987–1993)
- Ian Redford (1993–1994)
- John Young (1994–2000)
- Dick Campbell (2000–2005)
- Ian Campbell (2005–06)
- Michael O'Neill (2006–2008)
- Jim Duffy (2009–2010)
- Jim Weir (2010–2012)
- Ray McKinnon (2012–2015)
- Darren Dods (2015–2018)
- Barry Smith (2018–2019)
- Mark Wilson (2019–2020)
- Michael Paton (2020–2021)
- Andy Kirk (2021–2023)
- Gavin Price (2023–2024)
- Patrick Cregg (2024–2025)
- Ray McKinnon (2025–2026)

== Honours ==
- Second Division
  - Champions: 1982–83, 1989–90, 2004–05
  - Runners-Up: 1992–93, 2002–03
  - Play-off winners: 2016–17
- Third Division
  - Champions: 2001–02
  - Runners-Up: 1995–96
- Highland League
  - Champions: 2022–23
- Challenge Cup
  - Runners-Up: 2002–03
- Forfarshire Cup
  - Champions: 1909–10, 1952–53, 1958–59, 1996–97, 2008–09
- Scottish League Division C
  - Champions: 1953–54
- Scottish Qualifying Cup
  - Champions: 1950–51
- Keith Tournament
  - Champions: 1982–83

== Club records ==
- Record victory: 12–1: vs Thornhill F.C. on 23 January 1925–26
- Biggest loss: 0–10: vs Airdrieonians, Cowdenbeath and Albion Rovers 1937–38
- Biggest home attendance: 8,122: vs Aberdeen on 3 February 1972–73
- Record league appearances: David Watt 459
- Record scorer: Ian (Pink) Campbell 131
- Record for goals in one season: Grady McGrath (29) 2022–23

== Club staff ==
As of 24 May 2025

=== Board of directors ===
- Chairman: Kevin Mackie
- Vice-chairman: Grant Johnson
- Secretary: Gary Robertson
- Treasurer: John Littlewood
- Directors: Kevin Mackie, Grant Johnson, David Hamilton, Paul Ritchie, Peter Carmichael

=== Coaching staff ===
- Manager: Andy Kirk
- Assistant Manager: Paul Watson
- Goalkeeping Coach: Alex Connon
- Physio: Sebastian Panczyk
- Kitman: Willie Christie

== Current squad ==
As of 21 Oct 2026

Note: Flags indicate national team as defined under FIFA eligibility rules; some limited exceptions apply. Players may hold more than one non-FIFA nationality.

No.	Pos.	Nation	Player
1	GK	SCO	Kyle Gourlay
2	DF	SCO	Lewis Martin
3	DF	SCO	Greig Young
4	DF	SCO	Adam Hutchinson
5	DF	SCO	Euan Spark (captain)
6	MF	SCO	Ryan Blair
7	FW	SCO	Mitch Taylor
8	MF	SCO	Kyle Bell
9	FW	SCO	Darren Watson
10	MF	SCO	Fraser Macleod
11	MF	SCO	Kieran Inglis
12	DF	SCO	Ross Milne

No.	Pos.	Nation	Player
15	MF	SCO	Euan Hamilton (on loan from Airdrieonians)
16	MF	NIR	Corey Kirk
17	MF	SCO	Spencer Moreland
18	FW	SCO	Cormac Christie (on loan from Rangers)
19	FW	SCO	Brad Rodden
20	FW	SCO	Dale Hilson
21	GK	SCO	Adam Meek
22	DF	SCO	Brad McKay
—	DF	SCO	Mason Chisholm (on loan from Airdrieonians)
—	DF	SCO	Alfie Joss
—	FW	ENG	Curtis Main

=== On loan ===
Note: Flags indicate national team as defined under FIFA eligibility rules; some limited exceptions apply. Players may hold more than one non-FIFA nationality.

No.	Pos.	Nation	Player
—	MF	SCO	Luke Clark (on loan at Blairgowrie)
—	FW	SCO	Michael McQueen (on loan at Sauchie Juniors)

== Notable players ==
This list contains the players who have made at least 100 League appearances for Brechin City between the 1940s and the 2010s (figures indicate league appearances and goals scored, whilst bold type indicates a player still at the club).

- Bobby Aitken (149/3)
- Ray Allan (129/0)
- Richard Baillie (127/0)
- Kevin Bain (123/24)
- Roddie Black (200/19)
- Ralph Brand Jr. (174/43)
- Alex Brown (120/0)
- Bobby Brown (444/33)
- Harry Cairney (355/3)
- Dick Campbell (157/7)
- Ian Campbell (282/125)
- Graeme Christie (129/7)
- Doug Clark (145/5)
- Frank Conway (200/7)
- Andy Dow (100/7)
- Charlie Dunn (223/22)
- Alex Edmiston (127/0)
- Charlie Elvin (225/19)
- Craig Farnan (102/7)
- Ian Fleming (132/15)
- Graham Gibson (100/18)
- Ralph Gillespie (112/29)
- Steven Hampshire (123/31)
- Bisset Harrier (208/15)
- Hugh Hill (118/4)
- Jimmy Hodge (227/3)
- Andy Jackson (208/68)
- Steve Kerrigan (111/19)
- John Kidd (103/2)
- Charlie King (297/54)
- David Lawrie (166/0)
- Gordon Lees (203/41)
- Ray Lorimer (107/7)
- George Mackie (118/15)
- James McKellar (148/15)
- Duncan MacLeod (124/3)
- Paul McLean (299/21)
- Tom McLevy (236/0)
- Billy McNeill (128/17)
- Marc Millar (123/25)
- Jim Morton (124/22)
- Derek Neilson (244/0)
- Craig Nelson (209/0)
- Archie Paterson (142/1)
- Ian Paterson (256/65)
- Brian Reid (139/37)
- Brian Reid (303/6)
- John Ritchie (287/0)
- Paul Ritchie (179/60)
- Ronnie Robb (136/30)
- Sandy Ross (120/40)
- Frank Sandeman (128/12)
- Doug Scott (414/18)
- John Sime (164/1)
- Greig Smith (103/1)
- Jamie Smith (100/11)
- Peter Smith (141/5)
- Les Sneddon (157/43)
- Stuart Sorbie (118/23)
- Bobby Stewart (113/19)
- Ian Stewart (116/14)
- Clark Sutherland (104/7)
- Chris Templeman (129/55)
- George Tidy (124/0)
- Willie Tocher (159/15)
- Scott Walker (128/0)
- Bobby Warrender (200/83)
- David Watt (459/3)
