= 2007–08 Scottish Cup =

Tournament details
- Country: Scotland
- Teams: 81

Final positions
- Champions: Rangers
- Runners-up: Queen of the South

Tournament statistics
- Matches played: 80
- Goals scored: 344 (4.3 per match)
- Top goal scorer: Kris Boyd (6)

The 2007–08 Scottish Cup was the 123rd season of Scotland's most prestigious football knockout competition. The winners were Rangers, who defeated Queen of the South in the final.

The 2007–08 tournament saw a change in structure with the abolition of the Scottish Qualifying Cup and the admission of 4 members of the Scottish Junior Football Association to the first round.

== Calendar ==
Round	First match date	Fixtures		Clubs
Round	First match date	Original	Replays	Clubs
First Round	29 September 2007	17	2	81 → 64
Second Round	27 October 2007	16	2	64 → 48
Third Round	24 November 2007	16	2	48 → 32
Fourth Round	12 January 2008	16	4	32 → 16
Fifth Round	2 February 2008	8	3	16 → 8
Quarter-finals	10 March 2008	4	3	8 → 4
Semi-finals	12 April 2008	2	0	4 → 2
Final	24 May 2008	1	0	2 → 1

== First round ==
Edinburgh University were given a random bye to the 2nd round. This was because only three Scottish Junior Football Association clubs entered, due to Linlithgow Rose winning both the East League and the Scottish Junior Cup and there being no mechanism allowing for runners-up to enter (the other Juniors to enter were Culter from the North Region and Pollok from the West Region, all progressing to at least the 3rd round).

Keith, Inverurie Loco Works, Annan Athletic and Threave Rovers all received automatic byes into the 2nd round, due to being respectively: Highland Football League winners and runners-up, East of Scotland Football League winners and South of Scotland Football League winners during 2006–07 season.

29 September 2007	Brora Rangers	0–5	Cove Rangers	Dudgeon Park, Brora
15:00			Reid 43'; Watt 45', 63'; Henderson 52'; Whelan 83'	Referee: Roddy Cobb

29 September 2007	Golspie Sutherland	3–1	Preston Athletic	King George V Park, Golspie
15:00	Mackay 38' (pen.); Sutherland 52'; MacLean 59'		Scott 88'	Referee: Graham Fraser

29 September 2007	Coldstream	0–4	Dalbeattie Star	Home Park, Coldstream
15:00			Steel 5'; MacBeth 12'; Parker 30', 87'	Referee: Neil McLennan

29 September 2007	Glasgow University	1–2	Buckie Thistle	Garscube Sports Complex, Glasgow
15:00	Shewan 76' (o.g.)		Bruce 31'; Edmond 38'	Referee: Kevin Clancy

29 September 2007	Wigtown & Bladnoch	3–5	Burntisland Shipyard	Trammondford Park, Wigtown
15:00	White 37' (pen.), 86'; Campbell 40'		Reed 15'; Tillier 17'; Doogan 59' (o.g.); Masson 63'; Gray 67'	Referee: Des Roache

29 September 2007	Civil Service Strollers	1–2	Selkirk	Muirhouse, Edinburgh
15:00	Currie 78'		Livingston 35'; Jackson 62'	Referee: Graham Chambers

29 September 2007	Fort William	0–6	Spartans	Claggan Park, Fort William
15:00			Preston 35', 65'; King 44'; O'Donnell 52'; Beattie 76'; MacLeod 78'	Referee: David Watt

29 September 2007	Newton Stewart	0–6	Linlithgow Rose	Blairmount Park, Newton Stewart
15:00			Carrigan 30' (pen.), 85'; Heard 45', 88'; McArthur 46'; McSween 70'	Referee: Brian Templeton

29 September 2007	Vale of Leithen	3–1	Gala Fairydean	Caddon Park, Innerleithen
15:00	Somerville 6', 21'; Mackale 38'		Greene 78' (pen.)	Referee: Raymond Whyte

29 September 2007	Wick Academy	0–5	Deveronvale	Harmsworth Park, Wick
15:00			McKenzie 17'; Urquart 21'; Ewen 30'; Chisholm 75'; Dolan 83'	Referee: Ross Hamill

29 September 2007	Culter	7–0	Hawick Royal Albert	Crombie Park, Peterculter
15:00	Campbell 8' (o.g.); Mountford 26', 32', 69'; Stewart 30'; Chand 83', 87'			Referee: Alastair Mather

29 September 2007	Rothes	1–4	Nairn County	Mackessack Park, Rothes
15:00	Duncan 76'		Barron 11'; Mackintosh 56'; Finnigan 61'; Main 76'	Referee: Steven George

29 September 2007	St Cuthbert Wanderers	2–6	Pollok	St Mary's Park, Kirkcudbright
15:00	Chambers 64'; McGeown 66' (o.g.)		Downs 8', 52'; Dingwall 16', 87'; McGeown 69'; Waddell 90+2'	Referee: Martin Sproule

29 September 2007	Fraserburgh	1–1	Huntly	Bellslea Park, Fraserburgh
15:00				Referee: Neil Watters

29 September 2007	Girvan	2–0	Forres Mechanics	Hamilton Park, Girvan
15:00	Mitchell 2'; Moffat 71'			Referee: Richard Gough

29 September 2007	Lossiemouth	1–3	Whitehill Welfare	Grant Park, Lossiemouth
15:00	Wood 70'		Calvery 18', 47'; Doig 55'	Referee: Morag Pirie

29 September 2007	Clachnacuddin	2–2	Edinburgh City	Grant Street Park, Inverness
15:00	Duncanson 47'; Lawrie 80' (pen.)		MacNana 22'; Gair 33'	Referee: Matt Northcroft

Source: ESPN Soccernet

=== Replays ===
6 October 2007	Edinburgh City	1–0	Clachnacuddin	Meadowbank Stadium, Edinburgh
15:00	Dougie Gair 43'			Referee: Matt Northcroft

27 October 2007	Huntly	2–0	Fraserburgh	Christie Park, Huntly
15:00	Bruce Cormie 54'; Gary McGowan 63'			Referee: Neil Watters

Source: ESPN Soccernet

== Second round ==
27 October 2007	Whitehill Welfare	6–1	Golspie Sutherland	Ferguson Park, Rosewell, Midlothian
15:00	Swanson 5'; Johnston 6', 36'; Kidd 12'; Doig 51' (pen.); Gormley 52'		Keveran 50'	Attendance: 200; Referee: K Graham

27 October 2007	Buckie Thistle	4–1	Nairn County	Victoria Park, Buckie
15:00	Matheson 10'; Mackinnon 14'; Edmond 77'; Macrae 82'		McDonald 80'	Attendance: 532; Referee: N Watters

27 October 2007	Edinburgh City	1–2	East Stirlingshire	Meadowbank Stadium, Edinburgh
15:00	Gair 58'		Savage 71'; Simpson 83'	Attendance: 188; Referee: F McDermot

27 October 2007	Cove Rangers	3–0	Keith	Allan Park, Aberdeen
15:00	Watson 15', 77'; Coutts 53'			Attendance: 317; Referee: P Rafferty

27 October 2007	Edinburgh University	3–1	Deveronvale	East Peffermill
15:00	Friif 24', 49'; Woods 90'		McKenzie 39'	Attendance: 350; Referee: R Main

27 October 2007	Linlithgow Rose	4–1	Spartans	Prestonfield
15:00	Bradley 22'; Donnolly 60'; Tyrell 78'; Hogg 79'		MacLeod 54' (pen.)	Attendance: 1,600; Referee: S Nicholls

27 October 2007	Montrose	2–2	Pollok	Links Park, Montrose
15:00	Rogers 53'; Baird 70'		Downs 44'; Turnbull 85'	Attendance: 945; Referee: S McLean

27 October 2007	Forfar Athletic	1–1	Dumbarton	Station Park, Forfar
15:00	Chris MacKey 46'		Brian McPhee 52'	Attendance: 382; Referee: J McKendrick

27 October 2007	Inverurie Loco Works	0–2	East Fife	Harlaw Park, Inverurie
15:00			Tweed 55'; Cameron 77'	Attendance: 770; Referee: S McDonald

27 October 2007	Selkirk	0–2	Dalbeattie Star	Yarrow Park, Selkirk
15:00			Redpath 29', 38'	Attendance: 157; Referee: Brian Colvin

27 October 2007	Albion Rovers	8–0	Burntisland Shipyard	Cliftonhill, Coatbridge
15:00	Hunter 6', 22', 44', 47'; Adams 5'; Gemmell 46'; Martin 75'; Walker 88'			Attendance: 265; Referee: G Salmond

27 October 2007	Culter	2–1	Vale of Leithen	Crombie Park, Aberdeen
15:00	Farma 32'; Cadger 86'		Somerville 84'	Attendance: 500; Referee: S Creighton

27 October 2007	Girvan	1–2	Stranraer	Hamilton Park, Girvan
15:00	Mitchell 71'		Tade 41'; Keogh 88' (pen.)	Attendance: 410; Referee: A Boyd

27 October 2007	Arbroath	5–0	Elgin City	Gayfield Park, Arbroath
15:00	Webster 3'; Scott 27', 71'; Watson 51'; Sellars 89'			Attendance: 583; Referee: C Charleston

27 October 2007	Threave Rovers	1–0	Stenhousemuir	Meadow Park, Castle Douglas
15:00	Stenton 19'			Attendance: 300; Referee: T Robertson

27 October 2007	Annan Athletic	2–5	Huntly	Galabank Park, Annan
15:00	Jack 4' (pen.); Hill 45'		Gauld 14', 30'; Cormie 56'; Morrison 66', 72'	Attendance: 243; Referee: G Hilland

Source: ESPN Soccernet

=== Replays ===
3 November 2007	Pollok	0–1	Montrose	Newlandsfield Park, Glasgow
15:00			Dobbins 53'	Attendance: 1,873; Referee: Stevie McLean

6 November 2007	Dumbarton	3–0	Forfar Athletic	Strathclyde Homes Stadium, Dumbarton
19:45	Campbell 21'; Henderson 38'; McFarlane 47'			Attendance: 310; Referee: Euan Norris

Source: ESPN Soccernet

== Third round ==
24 November 2007	Albion Rovers	1–5	East Stirlingshire	Cliftonhill Stadium, Coatbridge
15:00	Gemmell 75'; Donald (red card) 45'		Kelly 20' (pen.); Ure 35'; Savage 45'; Brand 69'; Donaldson 88'	Attendance: 425; Referee: Frank McDermott

24 November 2007	Dumbarton	2–0	Berwick Rangers	Strathclyde Homes Stadium, Dumbarton
15:00	MacFarlane 5'; McPhee 36'			Attendance: 524; Referee: Colin Brown

24 November 2007	Culter	1–3	Huntly	Crombie Park, Peterculter
15:00	Mountford 18'		Cormie 22', 38'; McWilliam 60'	Attendance: 975; Referee: Willie Hornby

24 November 2007	Brechin City	1–1	East Fife	Glebe Park, Brechin
15:00	Callaghan 74' (pen.)		Smart 44'; Fotheringham (yellow card) 66' (yellow-red card) 83'	Attendance: 652; Referee: Scott MacDonald

24 November 2007	Stranraer	0–6	Stirling Albion	Stair Park, Stranraer
15:00	McKinstry (red card) 59'		Aitken 15' (pen.), 81'; McKenna 20'; Cramb 44'; Walker 48', 68'	Attendance: 326; Referee: Stevie O'Reilly

24 November 2007	Clyde	2–0	Montrose	Broadwood Stadium, Cumbernauld
15:00	Arbuckle 8'; Imrie 90'			Attendance: 821; Referee: Craig MacKay

24 November 2007	Cove Rangers	1–0	Edinburgh University	Allan Park, Cove Bay
15:00	McKibben 90'			Attendance: 480; Referee: Thomas Robertson

24 November 2007	Partick Thistle	2–1	Ayr United	Firhill Stadium, Glasgow
15:00	Roberts 45'; Buchanan 56'		Williams 19'	Attendance: 2,260; Referee: Douglas McDonald

24 November 2007	Threave Rovers	0–5	Raith Rovers	Meadow Park, Castle Douglas
15:00			Davidson 29'; Carcary 62', 72'; Hislop 77', 89'	Attendance: 629; Referee: John Underhill

24 November 2007	Greenock Morton	3–2	Buckie Thistle	Cappielow Park, Greenock
15:00	Russell 21'; McLaughlin 23'; Templeman 90'		Macrae 45'; Stewart 68'	Attendance: 1,833; Referee: Stephen Finnie

24 November 2007	Linlithgow Rose	1–0	Dalbeattie Star	Prestonfield, Linlithgow
15:00	McArthur 2'			Attendance: 1,519; Referee: George Salmond

24 November 2007	Arbroath	0–1	Cowdenbeath	Gayfield Park, Arbroath
15:00	Tosh (yellow card) 13' (yellow-red card) 38'		Clarke 5' (pen.)	Attendance: 595; Referee: Alan Freeland

24 November 2007	Ross County	4–0	Whitehill Welfare	Victoria Park, Dingwall
15:00	Shields 16', 56'; Scott 43'; Higgins 88'			Attendance: 1,208; Referee: Craig Charleston

24 November 2007	Livingston	4–0	Alloa Athletic	Almondvale Stadium, Livingston
15:00	Raliukonis 33'; MacKay 57' (pen.), 66'; Jacobs 63'			Attendance: 819; Referee: Iain Brines

24 November 2007	Peterhead	0–5	Queen of the South	Balmoor Stadium, Peterhead
15:00			Dobbie 27', 89'; O'Connor 44', 57'; Burns 90'	Attendance: 695; Referee: Euan Norris

24 November 2007	Airdrie United	1–1	Queen's Park	New Broomfield, Airdrie
15:00	McKeown 57'		Ferry 70'	Attendance: 1,016; Referee: Chris Boyle

Source: ESPN Soccernet

=== Replays ===
24 November 2007	Queen's Park	2–4	Airdrie United	Hampden Park, Glasgow
15:00	Trouten 75'; Ferry 90'		McDonald 15'; Noble 17'; Russell 97'; Watt 109'	Attendance: 579; Referee: Chris Boyle

24 November 2007	East Fife	1–2	Brechin City	Bayview Stadium, Methil
15:00	Cameron 25' (pen.)		Byers 20'; King 83'	Attendance: 659; Referee: Scott MacDonald

Source: ESPN Soccernet

== Fourth round ==
12 January 2008	Celtic	3–0	Stirling Albion	Celtic Park, Glasgow
15:00	Vennegoor of Hesselink 37'; McDonald 70'; Nakamura 75'	Report		Attendance: 27,923; Referee: Euan Norris

12 January 2008	Hamilton Academical	0–0	Brechin City	New Douglas Park, Hamilton
15:00		Report		Attendance: 1,023; Referee: Steven Nicholls

12 January 2008	St Mirren	3–0	Dumbarton	St Mirren Park, Paisley
15:00	Corcoran 17'; Barron 38'; Mehmet 70'	Report		Attendance: 2,828; Referee: Alan Muir

12 January 2008	Falkirk	2–2	Aberdeen	Falkirk Stadium, Falkirk
15:00	Barr 5'; Riera 73'	Report	Smith 4'; Lovell 10'	Attendance: 5,798; Referee: Michael McCurry

12 January 2008	Hibernian	3–0	Inverness Caledonian Thistle	Easter Road, Edinburgh
15:00	Shiels 5', 53', 84'; Morais (yellow card) 36' (yellow-red card) 87'	Report	McGuire (yellow card) 85' (yellow-red card) 88'	Attendance: 12,578; Referee: Steve Conroy

12 January 2008	Heart of Midlothian	2–2	Motherwell	Tynecastle Stadium, Edinburgh
15:00	Česnauskis 10'; Velička 52'	Report	Porter 64', 78'	Attendance: 13,651; Referee: Stuart Dougal

12 January 2008	Queen of the South	4–0	Linlithgow Rose	Palmerston Park, Dumfries
15:00	Dobbie 16'; Thomson 22'; O'Connor 40'; McArthur 72' (o.g.)	Report		Attendance: 3,062; Referee: John Underhill

12 January 2008	Greenock Morton	2–2	Gretna	Cappielow, Greenock
15:00	Finlayson 64'; McAlister 75'	Report	Yantorno 13'; Horwood 49'	Attendance: 2,848; Referee: Kenny Clark

15 January 2008	Huntly	1–3	Dundee	Christie Park, Huntly
19:45	Reid 77'	Report	McDonald 29'; Malone 81'; Daquin 90'	Attendance: 2,113; Referee: Craig MacKay

15 January 2008	Livingston	2–0	Cowdenbeath	Almondvale Stadium, Livingston
19:45	Craig 4'; McMenamin 31'	Report		Attendance: 830; Referee: Alan Freeland

15 January 2008	St Johnstone	3–1	Raith Rovers	McDiarmid Park, Perth
19:45	Jackson 19'; Milne 49'; Sheerin 57' (pen.)	Report	Weir 80'	Attendance: 2,113; Referee: Stephen Finnie

16 January 2008	Clyde	0–1	Dundee United	Broadwood Stadium, Cumbernauld
19:45		Report	Robson 57'	Attendance: 1,550; Referee: Charlie Richmond

22 January 2008	Partick Thistle	2–1	Dunfermline Athletic	Firhill Stadium, Glasgow
19:45	Buchanan 68', 87'	Report	Wilson 49'	Attendance: 2,434; Referee: Scott MacDonald

23 January 2008	Cove Rangers	2–4	Ross County	Allan Park, Aberdeen
19:45	Watt 63', 76' (pen.)	Report	Shields 10'; Dowie 30'; Boyd 33'; Barrowman 40' (pen.)	Attendance: 1,200; Referee: Stevie O'Reilly

23 January 2008	Rangers	6–0	East Stirlingshire	Ibrox Stadium, Glasgow
19:45	McCulloch 25', 50'; Hutton 28'; Boyd 30', 45', 62' (pen.)	Report		Attendance: 34,024; Referee: Crawford Allan

28 January 2008	Airdrie United	0–2	Kilmarnock	New Broomfield, Airdrie
19:45	Smith (yellow card) 78' (yellow-red card) 83'	Report	Hamill 25'; Nish 37' (pen.)	Attendance: 3,258; Referee: Dougie McDonald

Source: ESPN Soccernet

=== Replays ===
22 January 2008	Aberdeen	3–1	Falkirk	Pittodrie Stadium, Aberdeen
19:45	Smith 19', 55' de Visscher 43'	Report	Barrett 61'	Attendance: 8,547; Referee: Iain Brines

28 January 2008	Brechin City	2–1 (a.e.t.)	Hamilton Academical	Glebe Park, Brechin
19:45	King 48'; Byers 112'	Report	McLaughlin 12'	Attendance: 696; Referee: S Nicholls

22 January 2008	Motherwell	1–0	Heart of Midlothian	Fir Park, Motherwell
19:45	McCormack 23' (pen.)			Attendance: 8,300; Referee: Stuart Dougal

28 January 2008	Gretna	0–3	Greenock Morton	Palmerston Park, Dumfries
19:45		Report	Weatherson 67', 70'; Millar 78'	Attendance: 1,167; Referee: Kenny Clark

Source: ESPN Soccernet

== Fifth round ==
2 February 2008
12:00

Kilmarnock	1–5	Celtic
Jamie Hamill 66'		McDonald 22', 67'; Caldwell 52'; Vennegoor of Hesselink 58'; Samaras 85'

Rugby Park, Kilmarnock
Attendance: 6,491
Referee: Iain Brines

2 February 2008
15:00

Aberdeen	1–0	Hamilton Academical
Diamond 62'

Pittodrie Stadium, Aberdeen
Attendance: 6,441
Referee: Dougie McDonald

2 February 2008
15:00

Greenock Morton	0–2	Queen of the South
		O'Connor 46'; Stewart 87'

Cappielow, Greenock
Attendance: 3,506
Referee: Charlie Richmond

2 February 2008
15:00

Livingston	0–0	Partick Thistle

Almondvale Stadium, Livingston
Attendance: 2,110
Referee: Kenny Clark

2 February 2008
15:00

St Mirren	0–0	Dundee United

St Mirren Park, Paisley
Attendance: 3,945
Referee: Michael McCurry

3 February 2008
12:00

Hibernian	0–0	Rangers

Easter Road, Edinburgh
Attendance: 11,513
Referee: Craig Thomson

11 February 2008
19:45

Motherwell	1–2	Dundee
Smith 61'		McHale 49'; Robertson 55'; McDonald (yellow card) 75' (yellow-red card) 83'; MacKenzie (yellow card) 64' (yellow-red card) 88'

Fir Park, Motherwell
Attendance: 5,733
Referee: Eddie Smith

12 February 2008
19:45

Ross County	0–1	St Johnstone
		Craig 14'

Victoria Park, Dingwall
Attendance: 2,385
Referee: William Collum

=== Replays ===
12 February 2008
19:45

Partick Thistle	1–1 (a.e.t.)	Livingston
Twaddle 83'		Dorrans 41'
Penalties
	5–4

Firhill Stadium, Glasgow
Attendance: 2,554
Referee: Kenny Clark

13 February 2008
19:45

Dundee United	0–1	St Mirren
		Dorman 48'

Tannadice Park, Dundee
Attendance: 3,723
Referee: Alan Freeland

9 March 2008
15:00

Rangers	1–0	Hibernian
Burke 38'

Ibrox Stadium, Glasgow
Attendance: 33,837
Referee: Craig Thomson

== Quarter-finals ==
8 March 2008
15:00

Queen of the South	2–0	Dundee
Dobbie 52'; McCann 90'	Report

Palmerston Park, Dumfries
Attendance: 6,278
Referee: Michael McCurry

8 March 2008
15:00

St Johnstone	1–1	St Mirren
Craig 32' (pen.)	Report	Dorman 73'

McDiarmid Park, Perth
Attendance: 6,094
Referee: Douglas McDonald

9 March 2008
12:45

Aberdeen	1–1	Celtic
de Visscher 78'	Report	Vennegoor of Hesselink 90'

Pittodrie Stadium, Aberdeen
Attendance: 10,909
Referee: Charlie Richmond

19 March 2008
19:45

Rangers	1–1	Partick Thistle
Boyd 69'	Report	Gray 67'

Ibrox Stadium, Glasgow
Attendance: 36,724
Referee: Iain Brines

=== Replays ===
18 March 2008
19:45

St Mirren	1–3	St Johnstone
Mehmet 70' (pen.)	Report	Quinn 13'; Jackson 20'; MacDonald 28'

St Mirren Park, Paisley
Attendance: 4,596
Referee: Douglas McDonald

18 March 2008
19:45

Celtic	0–1	Aberdeen
	Report	Mackie 69'

Celtic Park, Glasgow
Attendance: 33,506
Referee: Charlie Richmond

13 April 2008
15:00

Partick Thistle	0–2	Rangers
	Report	Novo 27'; Burke 40'

Firhill Stadium, Glasgow
Attendance: 9,909
Referee: Iain Brines

== Semi-finals ==
12 April 2008
12:15

Queen of the South	4–3	Aberdeen
Tosh 22'; Burns 49'; O'Connor 56'; Stewart 60'	Report	Considine 36', 59'; Nicholson 53'

Hampden Park, Glasgow
Attendance: 24,008
Referee: Kenny Clark

20 April 2008
15:00

St Johnstone	1–1 (a.e.t.)	Rangers
McBreen 93'	Report	Novo 102' (pen.)
Penalties
Sheerin (penalty scored); Craig (penalty scored); Milne (penalty missed); Jackson (penalty scored); Morris (penalty missed)	3–4	(penalty scored) Davis; (penalty scored) Whittaker; (penalty scored) Nacho Novo; (penalty missed) Hemdani; (penalty scored) Cousin

Hampden Park, Glasgow
Attendance: 26,180
Referee: Douglas McDonald

== Final ==
24 May 2008
15:00

Queen of the South	2–3	Rangers
Tosh 50'; Thomson 52'	Report	Boyd 33', 71'; Beasley 43'

Hampden Park, Glasgow
Attendance: 48,821
Referee: Stuart Dougal

== Media coverage ==
- Domestically, both Sky Sports and BBC Sport Scotland broadcast selected live games, with both showing the final. Both also carry highlights of all games in every round.
- BBC Radio Scotland has exclusive domestic radio rights to the tournament.
- Through the SFA's international media partner IMG, the Scottish Cup is broadcast in various territories around the world. In Australia, for example, the Scottish Cup is currently available on Setanta Sports.

These matches were broadcast live on television:

Round	Sky Sports	BBC Scotland
Fourth round	Clyde vs Dundee United	
Fifth round	Hibernian vs Rangers; Dundee United vs St Mirren (Replay)	Kilmarnock vs Celtic
Quarter-finals	Aberdeen vs Celtic; Celtic vs Aberdeen (Replay)	
Semi-finals	Queen of the South vs Aberdeen	St Johnstone vs Rangers
Final	Queen of the South vs Rangers	

== Largest wins ==
A list of the largest wins from the competition.

Score	Home team	Away team	Stage
8-0	Albion Rovers	Burntisland Shipyard	Second Round
7-0	Culter	Hawick Royal Albert	First Round
6-0	Rangers	East Stirlingshire	Fourth Round
0-6	Fort William	Spartans	First Round
0-6	Newton Stewart	Linlithgow Rose	First Round
0-6	Stranraer	Stirling Albion	Third Round
6-1	Whitehill Welfare	Golspie Sutherland	Second Round
5-0	Arbroath	Elgin City	Second Round
0-5	Brora Rangers	Cove Rangers	First Round
0-5	Wick Academy	Deveronvale	First Round
0-5	Threave Rovers	Raith Rovers	Third Round
0-5	Peterhead	Queen of the South	Third Round
