= 2008 Scottish Cup final =

2008 Scottish Cup Final
- Event: 2007–08 Scottish Cup
Queen of the South	Rangers
2	3
- Date: 24 May 2008
- Venue: Hampden Park, Glasgow
- Man of the Match: Kris Boyd
- Referee: Stuart Dougal

The 2008 Scottish Cup Final was a football match which took place at Hampden Park in Glasgow on 24 May 2008. The match was the final of the 123rd Scottish Cup and was contested by Queen of the South and Rangers. Rangers won the match 3–2.

Queen of the South beat Aberdeen 4–3 in their semi-final, Rangers beat St Johnstone 4–3 on penalties after the match had ended 1–1 after extra time.

First Division Queen of the South were contesting a Scottish Cup final for the first time in their history. The final was four weeks after the end of Queens' league season, meaning the First Division side had not played a competitive game in that time. This was Rangers' 50th appearance in the final, winning 31 times and losing 17, with one final (1909) resulting in the cup being withheld It was Rangers' third cup final of the season, having won in the League Cup Final and lost in the UEFA Cup Final.

== Route to the final ==
Queen of the South				Round	Rangers			
Home team	Score	Away team	Scorers	Round	Home team	Score	Away team	Scorers
Peterhead	0 – 5	Queen of the South	Dobbie 27', 89'; O'Connor 44', 57'; Burns 90'	Round Three				
Queen of the South	4 – 0	Linlithgow Rose	Dobbie 16'; Thomson 22'; O'Connor 40'; McArthur 72' (o.g.)	Round Four	Rangers	6 – 0	East Stirlingshire	McCulloch 25', 50'; Hutton 28'; Boyd 30', 45', 62' (pen.)
Greenock Morton	0 – 2	Queen of the South	O'Connor 46'; Stewart 87'	Round Five	Hibernian	0 – 0	Rangers	
Greenock Morton	0 – 2	Queen of the South	O'Connor 46'; Stewart 87'	Replay	Rangers	1 – 0	Hibernian	Burke 88'
Queen of the South	2 – 0	Dundee	Dobbie 52'; McCann 90'	Quarter-finals	Rangers	1 – 1	Partick Thistle	Boyd 69'
Queen of the South	2 – 0	Dundee	Dobbie 52'; McCann 90'	Replay	Partick Thistle	0 – 2	Rangers	Novo 27'; Burke 40'
Queen of the South	4 – 3	Aberdeen	Tosh 22'; Burns 49'; O'Connor 56'; Stewart 60'	Semi-finals	St Johnstone	1 – 1 (a.e.t.) (3 – 4 pen.)	Rangers	Novo 102' (pen.)

== Match ==
=== Team news ===
Queen of the South started with the same team which had beaten Aberdeen in the semi-final with Stephen Dobbie and Sean O'Connor up-front as part of a 4-4-2 formation. The midfield was composed of Paul Burns, Neil MacFarlane, Steve Tosh and Jamie McQuilken. The defence was made up of Ryan McCann (the quarter-final hero with a goal against Dundee from 84 yards meriting an application to the Guinness Book of Records as the longest distance goal from an outfield player) Jim Thomson, Andy Aitken and Robert Harris. Jamie MacDonald started in goal. Sean O'Connor was the only player not from Scotland in the team. The only player to drop out of the squad from the semi-final victory was former Rangers youth Brian Gilmour, with Scott Robertson taking his place on the bench.

Rangers also used a 4–4–2 formation, making four changes from the side who were beaten 2–0 in Aberdeen, with Kris Boyd and Jean-Claude Darcheville up-front. Rangers were without Nacho Novo who was suspended and without Chris Burke and Steven Naismith who were both injured, DaMarcus Beasley had recently returned from injury and was a surprise inclusion and started in midfield with Kevin Thomson, Barry Ferguson and Lee McCulloch. Steven Whittaker, Carlos Cuéllar, David Weir and Saša Papac made up the defence. Neil Alexander was making only his 12th start in goal for rangers. Carlos Cuéllar, Saša Papac, DaMarcus Beasley and Jean-Claude Darcheville were the non-Scots to start, meaning that 17 out of the 22 players that started the match were from Scotland, this was 5 more than the previous year.

=== Match summary ===
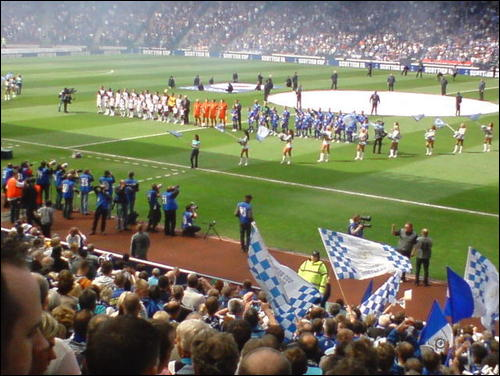
Two teams before the start of the match

Queen of the South were the more dangerous team in the early stages, with problems being caused by Stephen Dobbie and Sean O'Connor. Rangers' best chance came when Boyd passed to Beasley in a good position but his shot went into the side-netting, minutes later and the roles were reversed when Boyd met a Beasley cross eight yards with his head, he could only nod over the net, although should have done better. A disputed foul was awarded against Tosh for a challenge on Beasley 25 yards out. Barry Ferguson tapped the free kick to Boyd who hit the ball into the top left corner, Rangers were 1–0 up after 33 minutes. Queen of the South felt they should have had a penalty when Steven Whittaker pushed Sean O'Connor but the referee did not agree. Rangers doubled their lead three minutes before half time when Carlos Cuellar's header was missed by Jim Thomson and Ryan McCann who collided which allowed Cuellar's header to reach the back post to fall for Beasley, whose shot from 12 yards went under goalkeeper Jamie MacDonald.

Both teams started the second half unchanged. Four minutes after the restart, O'Connor broke clear of Cuellar in the Rangers box and then cut the ball back for Tosh to score using his pelvis. Queens were back in the match. Rangers briefly threatened to restore their advantage, but a Boyd header was held by MacDonald. Papac then fouled McCann 10 yards from the Rangers box. Thomson rose to firmly head home from the Bob Harris free-kick. After 53 minutes the sides were tied at 2–2. Rangers could have restored their lead when Jean-Claude Darcheville passed to Beasley and he then passed to the feet of Ferguson but the skipper shot straight at the keeper. Boyd scored after he rose highest from Beasley's corner to head the ball over the goalkeeper and into the net with 18 minutes to go. Queens never seemed likely to score after that despite making three changes.

=== Post match comments ===
Tosh commented in The Scotsman after the cup final, "We showed what we're capable of in the second half, and when I went into the Rangers dressing room they knew they had been in a game. But I'm still bitterly disappointed." Tosh added, "I thought the free-kick that led to their first goal was very soft and that lots of decisions that were given against us were very easy to give. Sean O'Connor got pushed in the back in the box at the back post and it was as blatant as the nose on my face but that would have been a decision against Rangers in a cup final at the Rangers end and that's just not going to happen."

"The gaffer (Gordon Chisholm) didn't lose his head (at half-time)," said Queens midfielder Jamie McQuilken, "he just said that we never showed up in the first half. He was spot on, but he reminded us of how we got to the final and inspired us to play like that in the second half."

McQuilken added, "We're so disappointed. You don't win anything by giving Rangers a two-goal lead and we don't think we'll ever get a better chance to beat Rangers. After we scored we got an extra spring in our step and they looked worried and tired. They were arguing amongst themselves and I thought 'we've got a right good chance here'. We needed to score in the first five minutes after our second goal when we were on top. But credit to Rangers, you don't get to UEFA Cup finals for nothing."

Chisholm said, "To be honest, I thought we didn't turn up in the first half and that was disappointing. I would say that is the poorest we have played in a long time. In the second half we did much better and it was more like us. There are no excuses but I think four weeks is a hell of a long time to have a break and for the first 45 minutes we looked rusty and we looked as though we didn't have any belief."

=== Match details ===
24 May 2008
15:00

Queen of the South	2–3	Rangers
Tosh 50'; Thomson 52'	Report	Boyd 33', 71'; Beasley 43'

Hampden Park, Glasgow
Attendance: 48,821
Referee: S Dougal

Queen of the South	Rangers

QUEEN OF THE SOUTH:
GK	1	(Scotland) Jamie MacDonald
RB	2	(Scotland) Ryan McCann		(substituted off) 85'
CB	6	(Scotland) Jim Thomson (c)
CB	5	(Scotland) Andy Aitken
LB	3	(Scotland) Robert Harris
RM	11	(Scotland) Paul Burns
CM	4	(Scotland) Neil MacFarlane
CM	8	(Scotland) Steve Tosh	(yellow card) 74'
LM	7	(Scotland) Jamie McQuilken		(substituted off) 75'
ST	10	(Scotland) Stephen Dobbie		(substituted off) 82'
ST	9	(England) Sean O'Connor
Substitutes:
GK	12	(Scotland) Stephen Grindlay
DF	16	(Scotland) Eric Paton
MF	15	(Scotland) John O'Neill		(substituted on) 82'
MF	17	(Scotland) Scott Robertson		(substituted on) 85'
ST	14	(Scotland) John Stewart		(substituted on) 75'
Manager:
(Scotland) Gordon Chisholm

RANGERS :
GK	25	(Scotland) Neil Alexander
RB	28	(Scotland) Steven Whittaker
CB	24	(Spain) Carlos Cuéllar
CB	3	(Scotland) David Weir
LB	5	(Bosnia and Herzegovina) Saša Papac
RM	20	(United States) DaMarcus Beasley		(substituted off) 75'
CM	8	(Scotland) Kevin Thomson
CM	6	(Scotland) Barry Ferguson (c)
LM	27	(Scotland) Lee McCulloch	(yellow card) 4'
ST	9	(Scotland) Kris Boyd
ST	19	(France) Jean-Claude Darcheville		(substituted off) 85'
Substitutes:
GK	16	(Scotland) Graeme Smith
DF	23	(Scotland) Christian Dailly
DF	37	(Scotland) Jordan McMillan
MF	12	(Northern Ireland) Steven Davis		(substituted on) 75'
MF	43	(Scotland) John Fleck		(substituted on) 85'
Manager:
(Scotland) Walter Smith

MATCH OFFICIALS

- Assistant referees:
  - James Bee
  - John Gilmour
- Fourth official: Alan Freeland

MATCH RULES

- 90 minutes
- 30 minutes of extra time if scores are level
- Penalty shootout if scores still level
- Five named substitutes
- Maximum of 3 substitutions

=== Statistics ===
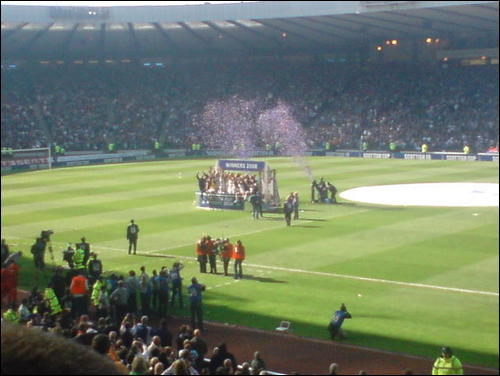
Rangers celebrating their victory

Statistic	Queen of the South	Rangers
Goals scored	2	3
Total shots	4	19
Shots on target	4	12
Ball possession	47%	53%
Corner kicks	4	10
Fouls committed	13	12
Offsides	2	2
Yellow cards	1	1
Red cards	0	0

Source: Guardian report

== Scottish Cup record ==
- John Fleck became the youngest player to play in a Scottish Cup final – 16 years, 274 days – after coming on as a substitute in the 85th minute.

== Media coverage ==
The 2008 Scottish Cup Final between Rangers and Queen of the South was broadcast live in Scotland on BBC One Scotland and in the rest of the UK on Sky Sports Xtra. BBC One Scotland also broadcast highlights later on that night at 23:35 BST.

In North America it was broadcast live on pay-per-view Setanta Premium. In Kenya it was shown live on G Sports 1. In the Czech Republic it was shown live on Sport 1. In Italy it was shown live on Sky Sport 1 and Sky Super Calcio. In Russia it was broadcast live on 7tv. In Bosnia it was shown live on OBN BiH.

The final was also broadcast live on radio by BBC Radio Scotland, BBC Radio nan Gàidheal and BBC Radio 5 Live.
