= Paul Burns (footballer) =

Scottish footballer (born 1984)

Personal information
- Date of birth: 18 May 1984 (age 42)
- Place of birth: Irvine, Scotland
- Position: Right midfielder

Senior career*
| Years | Team | Apps | (Gls) |
| 2002–2011 | Queen of the South | 226 | (25) |
| 2011–2012 | Dunfermline Athletic | 26 | (2) |
| 2012–2015 | Queen of the South | 54 | (3) |
| 2015–2021 | Cumnock Juniors | | |
| Total | | 307 | (30) |

Managerial career
- 2018–2019: Cumnock Juniors
- * Club domestic league appearances and goals

Paul Burns (born 18 May 1984) is a Scottish former professional association footballer who played primarily as a right midfielder.

During his career, Burns played in two spells for Queen of the South punctuated with a season at Dunfermline Athletic. His most prominent moment was scoring for Queens in their 4–3 Scottish Cup semi final victory over Aberdeen in 2008. He left the professional ranks in 2015 at the age of 31 to take a career outside football. He spent the final six years of his career with Scottish Junior Football side Cumnock Juniors, his home-town club.

== Early life ==
Born in the local maternity hospital in Irvine, North Ayrshire, but brought up in Cumnock, he is the grandson of the late Mick Morran, who served Ayrshire Junior side Glenafton Athletic as physiotherapist for thirty-five years.

Burns played for a number of youth teams, including the same Ayr Valspar Boys Club side as Scottish international defender Kirk Broadfoot. It was whilst playing with them that he was spotted by Queen of the South and signed up as a sixteen-year-old.

== Career ==
=== Queen of the South ===
Having signed for Queen of the South youth team in 2000, he was promoted to the senior side on 17 June 2002. Burns made his first team debut in a league match against Arbroath on 18 March 2003, three years after joining the Dumfries side. He came on as an 84-minute substitute for Eric Paton. His first goal came verses Ross County in a 3–0 League Cup victory on 23 September 2003. He became a popular player amongst the fans due to his committed performances and his hard, crowd pleasing tackles.

Early in his spell in Dumfries, Burns was a member of the starting eleven that topped the Scottish First Division, the first time Queens had done so in fifty years, thanks to a 3–2 win over Inverness in October 2003. Burns made his 100th start in a league defeat to Hamilton Academical on 18 August 2007 and was rewarded with a presentation at Palmerston Park before Queens' league match against Livingston a week later.

Burns scored the second goal for Queens in the thrilling 4–3 victory over Aberdeen in the semi-final of the 2008 Scottish Cup. This goal along with others from Steve Tosh, Sean O'Connor and John Stewart ensured Queen of the South played in their first Scottish Cup final on 24 May 2008 at Hampden Park. Burns played in the final as Queens went down 3–2 to Rangers despite a battling second half performance. Queens finished 2007–08 in fourth place in Scottish football's second flight.

In 2008–09 Burns played in both of Queen of the South's UEFA Cup second round qualification games. In the top of table clash at home against Livingston on 4 October, Burns hit the Queens sixth goal of the day. The 6–1 victory saw Queens go top in the First Division for the first time in five years.

Burns signed a contract extension, which will see him at Queens until 31 May 2011, accumulating a total of 11 years spent at Queen of the South. He made his 200th appearance for the side in a Challenge Cup match Dunfermline Athletic on 18 August 2009 with his 200th start coming in the same season against Airdrie United on 12 April 2010. On 4 September 2010 in the 5–0 challenge Cup tie win at Palmerston Park against East Fife Burns scored his first ever hat trick. His 250th appearance came during a 0–0 draw away to Stirling Albion on 25 September 2010. He ended the 2010/11 season with a double in the 3–0 home win against Dundee in the last game of the season in what proved to be his final appearance for Queen of the South. He made a total of 273 appearances (239 starts) for the club scoring 34 goals in the process.

=== Dunfermline Athletic ===
On 31 May 2011 it was announced that Burns had left Queen of the South and joined Dunfermline Athletic on a Bosman free transfer, signing a two-year contract. He made his debut for the club in a Scottish Premier League match against St Mirren on 25 July 2011. Burns scored his first goal for the club against Dundee United on 20 August 2011 in which the Pars won 1–0.

=== Return to Queens ===
Burns returned to Queen of the South after negotiating his release from Dunfermline Athletic on 31 August 2012, signing a one-year deal with the option of another year. Burns was the final player left at the club who featured in the 2008 Scottish Cup Final.

On 13 July 2015 the Queens website announced that Burns would be leaving the club to take up a career outwith the game. Burns farewell appearance for the club was the following evening in a pre-season friendly at home to Kilmarnock. Burns joined the game as a second-half substitute in a 2–2 draw and was given the captain's armband as well as a guard of honour by his teammates when leaving the field after the final whistle. Burns left Queens and senior football at the age of 31.

=== Cumnock Juniors ===
After leaving Queens, Burns signed for his home town club Cumnock Juniors on 24 July 2015. This was announced on their official website on the same day. In December 2018, Paul took over as manager of Cumnock Juniors. Burns spent six season with Cumnock before deciding to retire at the end of the 2020–21 season.

== Career statistics ==
As of 14 June 2021

Appearances and goals by club, season and competition
| Club | Season | League | | | Cup | | League Cup | | Other | | Total | |
| Club | Season | Division | Apps | Goals | Apps | Goals | Apps | Goals | Apps | Goals | Apps | Goals |
|---|---|---|---|---|---|---|---|---|---|---|---|---|
| Queen of the South | 2002–03 | Scottish First Division | 4 | 0 | 0 | 0 | 0 | 0 | 0 | 0 | 4 | 0 |
| Queen of the South | 2003–04 | Scottish First Division | 29 | 0 | 2 | 0 | 3 | 1 | 0 | 0 | 34 | 1 |
| Queen of the South | 2004–05 | Scottish First Division | 23 | 1 | 2 | 0 | 1 | 0 | 2 | 0 | 28 | 1 |
| Queen of the South | 2005–06 | Scottish First Division | 33 | 4 | 2 | 0 | 0 | 0 | 1 | 1 | 36 | 5 |
| Queen of the South | 2006–07 | Scottish First Division | 18 | 0 | 2 | 0 | 2 | 0 | 2 | 0 | 24 | 0 |
| Queen of the South | 2007–08 | Scottish First Division | 28 | 5 | 6 | 2 | 0 | 0 | 0 | 0 | 34 | 7 |
| Queen of the South | 2008–09 | Scottish First Division | 29 | 3 | 1 | 0 | 0 | 0 | 5 | 0 | 35 | 3 |
| Queen of the South | 2009–10 | Scottish First Division | 35 | 6 | 1 | 0 | 3 | 1 | 3 | 0 | 42 | 7 |
| Queen of the South | 2010–11 | Scottish First Division | 27 | 6 | 1 | 0 | 3 | 0 | 5 | 4 | 36 | 10 |
| Queen of the South | Total | | 226 | 25 | 17 | 2 | 12 | 2 | 18 | 5 | 273 | 34 |
| Dunfermline Athletic | 2011–12 | Scottish Premier League | 25 | 2 | 1 | 0 | 2 | 0 | 0 | 0 | 28 | 2 |
| Dunfermline Athletic | 2012–13 | Scottish First Division | 1 | 0 | 0 | 0 | 0 | 0 | 0 | 0 | 1 | 0 |
| Dunfermline Athletic | Total | | 26 | 2 | 1 | 0 | 2 | 0 | 0 | 0 | 29 | 2 |
| Queen of the South | 2012–13 | Scottish Second Division | 25 | 2 | 2 | 0 | 1 | 0 | 0 | 0 | 28 | 2 |
| Queen of the South | 2013–14 | Scottish Championship | 25 | 1 | 2 | 0 | 2 | 0 | 2 | 0 | 31 | 1 |
| Queen of the South | 2014–15 | Scottish Championship | 5 | 0 | 2 | 0 | 0 | 0 | 0 | 0 | 7 | 0 |
| Queen of the South | Total | | 55 | 3 | 6 | 0 | 3 | 0 | 2 | 0 | 66 | 3 |
| Career total | | | 307 | 30 | 24 | 2 | 17 | 2 | 20 | 5 | 368 | 39 |

== Personal life ==
In the summer of 2009, Burns became the first footballer in the United Kingdom to contract swine flu. That same summer a second Queens player, Bob Harris, contracted the virus while on holiday in Ibiza.

== Honours ==
=== Queen of the South ===
- Scottish Second Division winner: 2012–13
- 2008 Scottish Cup runner up
- 2011 Scottish Challenge Cup runner up
