= Jamie McQuilken =

Scottish footballer (born 1974)

Personal information
- Full name: James Charles McQuilken
- Date of birth: 3 October 1974 (age 52)
- Place of birth: Glasgow, Scotland
- Position: Left-back

Senior career*
| Years | Team | Apps | (Gls) |
| 1993–1995 | Celtic | 5 | (0) |
| 1995–1997 | Dundee United | 18 | (0) |
| 1997–1998 | Hibernian | 10 | (0) |
| 1998–2003 | Falkirk | 157 | (6) |
| 2003–2004 | Aberdeen | 7 | (0) |
| 2004–2005 | St Johnstone | 15 | (0) |
| 2005–2007 | Gretna | 57 | (4) |
| 2007–2010 | Queen of the South | 85 | (2) |
| 2011–???? | Cambuslang Rangers | | |

International career
| 1993 | Scotland U21 | 3 | (0) |
- * Club domestic league appearances and goals

James Charles McQuilken (born 3 October 1974) is a Scottish retired professional footballer who last played for Scottish First Division side Queen of the South. He was born in Glasgow and started his career with Celtic. He then moved to Dundee United where he played from November 1995 until October 1996. He joined Hibernian in January 1997 and then moved to Falkirk. He moved from there to Aberdeen and then to St Johnstone. At the beginning of the 2004–5 season he moved to Gretna on a six-month loan that became permanent. He had a heart scare in 2006 and moved to Dumfries Club in January 2007. He then agreed to a one-year contract with The Doonhamers before saying in December 2009 that he was leaving his career for the police. He was back, however, in the 2011/12 season, joining the Cambuslang Rangers.

== Career ==
Born in Glasgow, McQuilken began his career with Celtic and made five league appearances for the club. He moved to Dundee United in November 1995, making his début as a substitute in the 1995 Scottish Challenge Cup Final defeat to Stenhousemuir. The following month, McQuilken made his first start as United recorded their biggest win of the season, beating Dumbarton 8–0 at Tannadice. Used as both a left-back and left midfielder, McQuilken featured fourteen times that season, including both legs of the playoff win over Partick Thistle. The following season, McQuilken was deployed as a left-back for the first six matches before being confined mainly to the bench. Featuring a handful of times more, he played his last game in October 1996 before joining Hibernian in January 1997. Featuring in ten of Hibs' remaining matches that season, McQuilken moved to Falkirk at the start of the 1997–98 season.

At Falkirk, McQuilken became a regular, playing in the majority of matches each season and playing most of the club's title-winning season in 2002–03. McQuilken moved on to Aberdeen in June 2003 but was made available for transfer in January 2004 and within days, McQuilken moved to St Johnstone. At the start of the 2004–05 season, he moved to Gretna on a six-month loan deal which was subsequently made permanent.

After suffering a heart scare in September 2006, McQuilken moved to Dumfries club Queen of the South in January 2007. He played in the club's first ever run to Scottish Cup final in 2008 and in the subsequent UEFA Cup games in the following season. Shortly afterwards, McQuilken agreed a new one-year contract with The Doonhamers. On 8 December 2009 Queens announced McQuilken would be leaving the club in January to start a new career in the Police. Before the 2011–12 season, McQuilken joined junior club Cambuslang Rangers.

== Career statistics ==
| Club | Season | League | | Cup | | Lg Cup | | Other | | Total | |
| Club | Season | Apps | Goals | Apps | Goals | Apps | Goals | Apps | Goals | Apps | Goals |
|---|---|---|---|---|---|---|---|---|---|---|---|
| Celtic | 1993–94 | 0 | 0 | 0 | 0 | 0 | 0 | 0 | 0 | 0 | 0 |
| Celtic | 1994–95 | 5 | 0 | 0 | 0 | 0 | 0 | 0 | 0 | 5 | 0 |
| Total | 5 | 0 | 0 | 0 | 0 | 0 | 0 | 0 | 5 | 0 | 0 |
| Dundee United | 1995–96 | 11 | 0 | 1 | 0 | 0 | 0 | 1 | 0 | 13 | 0 |
| Dundee United | 1996–97 | 9 | 0 | 0 | 0 | 2 | 0 | 0 | 0 | 11 | 0 |
| Dundee United | Total | 20 | 0 | 1 | 0 | 2 | 0 | 1 | 0 | 24 | 0 |
| Hibernian | 1996–97 | 8 | 0 | 1 | 0 | 0 | 0 | 0 | 0 | 9 | 0 |
| Hibernian | 1997–98 | 1 | 0 | 0 | 0 | 0 | 0 | 0 | 0 | 1 | 0 |
| Hibernian | Total | 9 | 0 | 1 | 0 | 0 | 0 | 0 | 0 | 10 | 0 |
| Falkirk | 1998–99 | 22 | 0 | 3 | 0 | 2 | 0 | 0 | 0 | 27 | 0 |
| Falkirk | 1999–00 | 31 | 2 | 4 | 0 | 2 | 0 | 1 | 0 | 38 | 2 |
| Falkirk | 2000–01 | 34 | 0 | 2 | 0 | 2 | 0 | 1 | 0 | 39 | 0 |
| Falkirk | 2001–02 | 35 | 2 | 2 | 0 | 2 | 0 | 2 | 0 | 41 | 2 |
| Falkirk | 2002–03 | 35 | 2 | 3 | 0 | 3 | 0 | 3 | 0 | 44 | 2 |
| Falkirk | Total | 137 | 6 | 14 | 0 | 11 | 0 | 7 | 0 | 169 | 6 |
| Aberdeen | 2003–04 | 7 | 0 | 0 | 0 | 1 | 0 | 0 | 0 | 8 | 0 |
| Aberdeen | Total | 7 | 0 | 0 | 0 | 1 | 0 | 0 | 0 | 8 | 0 |
| St Johnstone | 2003–04 | 15 | 1 | 0 | 0 | 1 | 0 | 0 | 0 | 16 | 1 |
| St Johnstone | Total | 15 | 1 | 1 | 0 | 0 | 0 | 0 | 0 | 16 | 1 |
| Gretna (loan) | 2004–05 | 32 | 2 | 2 | 0 | 0 | 0 | 2 | 0 | 36 | 2 |
| Gretna (loan) | Total | 32 | 2 | 2 | 0 | 0 | 0 | 2 | 0 | 36 | 2 |
| Gretna | 2005–06 | 23 | 2 | 5 | 0 | 2 | 0 | 1 | 0 | 31 | 2 |
| Gretna | 2006–07 | 2 | 0 | 0 | 0 | 0 | 0 | 3 | 0 | 5 | 0 |
| Gretna | Total | 25 | 0 | 5 | 0 | 2 | 0 | 1 | 0 | 36 | 2 |
| Queen of the South | 2006–07 | 15 | 0 | 4 | 0 | 0 | 0 | 0 | 0 | 19 | 0 |
| Queen of the South | 2007–08 | 32 | 1 | 4 | 0 | 1 | 0 | 1 | 0 | 38 | 1 |
| Queen of the South | 2008–09 | 22 | 2 | 1 | 0 | 0 | 0 | 0 | 0 | 23 | 2 |
| Queen of the South | Total | 69 | 3 | 9 | 0 | 1 | 0 | 1 | 0 | 80 | 3 |
| Career total | | 213 | 11 | 9 | 0 | 14 | 1 | 7 | 1 | 243 | 13 |

== Honours ==
Dundee United

- Scottish Challenge Cup runner-up (1): 1995–96

Falkirk

- Scottish First Division winner (1): 2002–03

Queen of the South

- Scottish Cup runner-up (1): 2007–08
