= 2006–07 in Scottish football =

Football in Scotland
- Season: 2006–07

2006–07 in Scottish football

Premier League champions
- Celtic

First Division champions
- Gretna

Second Division champions
- Greenock Morton

Third Division champions
- Berwick Rangers

Scottish Cup winners
- Celtic

League Cup winners
- Hibernian

Challenge Cup winners
- Ross County

Junior Cup winners
- Linlithgow Rose

Teams in Europe
- Celtic, Gretna, Hibernian, Heart of Midlothian, Rangers

Scotland national team
- UEFA Euro 2008 qualifying

The 2006–07 season was the 110th season of competitive football in Scotland.

== Notable events ==
=== 2006 ===
- 9 July: Rangers defender Fernando Ricksen is banned for the club's pre-season trip to South Africa, following an incident on the outbound flight. Manager Paul Le Guen cited "wholly inappropriate and unacceptable" behaviour as the reason for Ricksen's omission. Ricksen later admitted that he fears for his future at Rangers claiming that the club have other motives for wanting him out. He was later loaned to Russian Premier League club Zenit Saint Petersburg.
- 29 July: Scotland under-19s lose 2–1 to Spain in the final of the European Under-19 Football Championship.
- 23 October: In the wake of their 2–0 home defeat to Kilmarnock, Hearts head coach Valdas Ivanauskas is given a two-week leave of absence after discussions with majority shareholder Vladimir Romanov. Ivanauskas cited ill-health as the reason for his temporary departure. Sporting Director, and former coach of Belarus, Eduard Malofeev is appointed for the interim.
- 27 October: Hearts' majority shareholder Vladimir Romanov states that he will sell players if the club fail to beat Dunfermline Athletic in their forthcoming fixture. Club captain Steven Pressley released a statement shortly after expressing the players' discontent at the current situation at the club.
- 14 November: After their 1–1 draw away at Falkirk, Hearts announce that interim head coach Eduard Malofeev is to be replaced by FBK Kaunas manager Eugenijus Riabovas, this is to allow Malofeev to pursue his Uefa coaching Pro-licence.
- 24 November: Valdas Ivanauskas returns as Hearts head-coach.
- 9 December: Hearts part company with captain Steven Pressley.
- 20 December: Dundee part company with striker Andy McLaren after he was given three red cards in a 2–1 defeat to Clyde.

=== 2007 ===
- 1 January: It is reported that Barry Ferguson has been stripped of the captaincy of Rangers and will not play for the club again under Paul Le Guen. Gavin Rae is appointed as the new captain.
- 2 January: Paul Le Guen confirms that Gavin Rae will be the new Rangers captain. With regard to Barry Ferguson he stated "When you have someone you feel undermines you, it becomes harder and harder". Asked whether Ferguson had been placed on the transfer list, Le Guen said "It remains to be seen. My own position, which is precarious, may have an influence on that."
- 4 January: Paul Le Guen leaves Rangers by mutual consent after meeting with Rangers chairman Sir David Murray.
- 8 January: The Scottish Football Association reject an approach from Rangers for manager Walter Smith. A statement from the SFA revealed that Smith had requested to be relieved of his contract, however this was refused following a meeting.
- 10 January: Walter Smith is confirmed as Rangers manager, having resigned from his position as Scotland manager. The SFA release a statement stating that "No agreement has been reached with Mr Smith or Rangers Football Club on any compensation payment" and "In the absence of agreement, proceedings will require to be raised against Mr Smith for breach of contract and Rangers Football Club for inducement to breach the contract."
- 11 January: The SFA agree a compensation package with Rangers over manager Walter Smith's switch to Ibrox.
- 2 March: For the second time of the season, Hearts manager Valdas Ivanauskas is given leave of absence by the club. Sporting Director, and former CSKA Moscow player Anatoly Korobochka is appointed on a temporary basis.
- 18 March: Hibernian win the Scottish League Cup, defeating Kilmarnock 5–1 in the final.
- 7 April: Second Division team Forfar Athletic become the first team in Scotland to confirm their relegation following a 9–1 defeat by Greenock Morton.
- 14 April: Greenock Morton are promoted as champions of the Second Division, despite losing 2–0 to Raith Rovers.
- 21 April: Berwick Rangers are promoted as champions of the Third Division after a 1–0 win over Arbroath.
- 22 April: Celtic are crowned Scottish Premier League champions for the second successive season after defeating Kilmarnock 2–1.
- 28 April: Gretna win promotion to the Premier League as First Division champions after beating Ross County 3–2 at Victoria Park, a result that relegated County to the Second Division.
- 3 May: East Stirlingshire, having finished bottom of the Third Division for the fifth consecutive season, are told they will lose full member status if the club finish bottom again next season.
- 5 May: Rangers ensure second place in the SPL and entry to the UEFA Champions League Second qualifying round after defeating Celtic 2–0 at Ibrox.
- 12 May: Queen's Park gain promotion to the Second Division after defeating East Fife 7–2 on aggregate in the promotion play-off. The Glasgow club swap places with Stranraer who lost to East Fife in the semi-final stage.
- 12 May: Stirling Albion gain promotion to the First Division, and swap places with Airdrie United, after defeating the North Lanarkshire club 5–4 on aggregate in the promotion/relegation play-off match

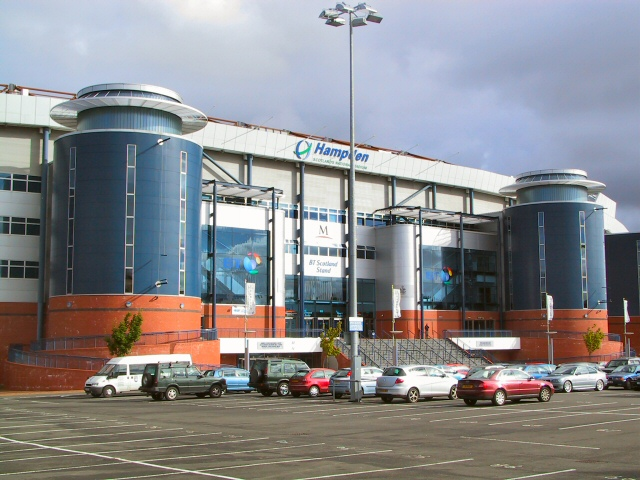
The 2007 UEFA Cup Final was played at Hampden Park, Glasgow.

- 12 May: Dunfermline Athletic are relegated to the First Division. A 2–1 defeat at Inverness, coupled with St Mirren's 3–2 win at Motherwell, meant the Fife club exit the SPL after seven seasons in the top flight.
- 16 May: Sevilla win the UEFA Cup after defeating Espanyol 3–1 on penalties at Hampden Park. The match had finished 2–2 after 90 minutes.
- 20 May: Aberdeen seal a UEFA Cup place for next season after defeating Rangers 2–0 at Pittodrie in the final game of the season.
- 26 May: SPL champions Celtic complete the double after defeating Dunfermline Athletic 1–0 to win the Scottish Cup for the 34th time.

== Major transfer deals ==
=== 2006 ===
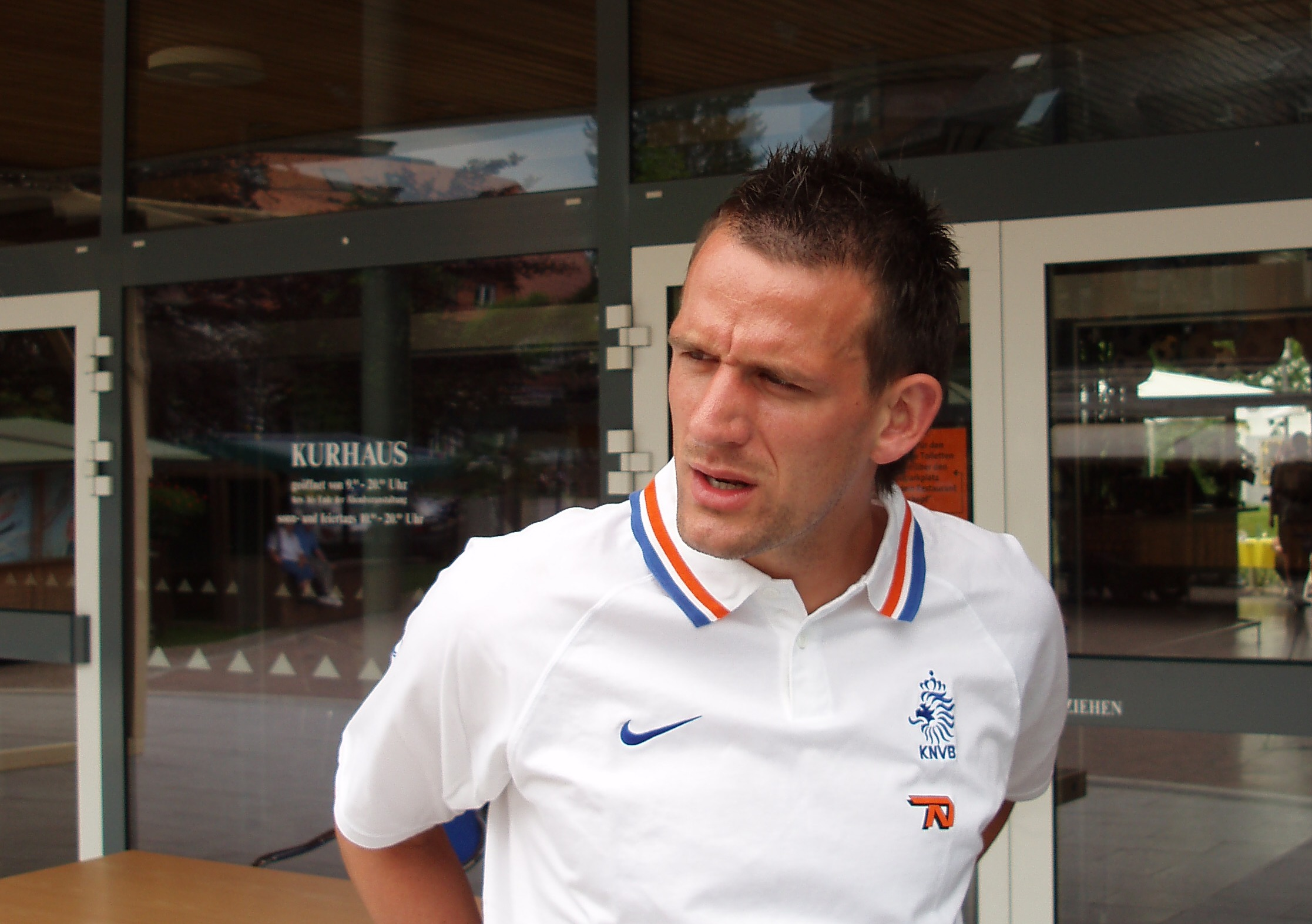
Jan Vennegoor of Hesselink moved from PSV Eindhoven to Celtic for £3.4m

Celtic made preparations for the Champions League with the high-profile signings of Jan Vennegoor of Hesselink from PSV Eindhoven, Jiri Jarosik from Chelsea and Thomas Gravesen from Real Madrid while Stilyan Petrov left to join former boss Martin O'Neill at Aston Villa. Celtic also signed former Rangers striker Kenny Miller on a free transfer from Wolverhampton Wanderers. Rangers, under new manager Paul Le Guen, brought in several players including Jérémy Clément from Paris Saint Germain and Filip Sebo from Austria Vienna while Peter Løvenkrands departed for Schalke 04. Hearts paid £200,000 for PAOK defender Christos Karipidis and sold Rudi Skácel to Southampton after a dispute between the player and the club. Hibs brought in English League Two defenders Rob Jones and Shelton Martis but lost last season's top scorer Derek Riordan who joined Celtic.

==== Domestic ====
- 20 June 2006 – Noel Hunt from Dunfermline Athletic to Dundee United, £50,000
- 23 June 2006 – Derek Riordan from Hibernian to Celtic, Undisclosed (reportedly £150,000)
- 1 July 2006 – Gary Caldwell from Hibernian to Celtic, Bosman
- 11 July 2006 – Ross McCormack from Rangers to Motherwell, Undisclosed
- 13 July 2006 – John Rankin from Ross County to Inverness CT, Undisclosed (reportedly £65,000)
- 11 August 2006 – David Proctor from Inverness CT to Dundee United, £35,000
- 19 August 2006 – David Fernández from Dundee United to Kilmarnock, Free
- 29 August 2006 – Jim Hamilton from Motherwell to Dunfermline Athletic, Undisclosed
- 31 August 2006 – Stephen Crawford from Aberdeen to Dunfermline Athletic, Free
- 31 August 2006 – John Stewart from Aberdeen to Falkirk, £50,000
- 31 August 2006 – Lee Miller from Dundee United to Aberdeen, Free

==== In ====
- 16 May 2006 – Libor Sionko from Austria Vienna to Rangers, Bosman
- 26 May 2006 – Karl Svensson from IFK Göteborg to Rangers, Undisclosed (reportedly £600,000)
- 8 June 2006 – Rob Jones from Grimsby Town to Hibernian, £100,000
- 16 June 2006 – Lionel Letizi from Paris Saint-Germain to Rangers, Free
- 19 June 2006 – Jiri Jarosik from Chelsea to Celtic, Undisclosed (reportedly £2m)
- 1 July 2006 – Kenny Miller from Wolverhampton Wanderers to Celtic, Bosman
- 7 July 2006 – Jérémy Clément from Olympique Lyonnais to Rangers, £1.1m
- 15 July 2006 – Makhtar N'Diaye from Unattached to Rangers, Free
- 28 July 2006 – Mauricio Pinilla from Sporting Lisbon to Heart of Midlothian, Season loan
- 1 August 2006 – Graham Barrett from Unattached to Falkirk, Free
- 1 August 2006 – Colin McMenamin from Shrewsbury Town to Gretna, Free
- 2 August 2006 – Christian Kalvenes from SK Brann to Dundee United, Free
- 2 August 2006 – Joe Hamill from Leicester City to Livingston, Free
- 3 August 2006 – Christos Karipidis from PAOK to Heart of Midlothian, £200,000
- 3 August 2006 – Filip Sebo from Austria Wien to Rangers, £1.8m
- 4 August 2006 – Tiago Costa from Benfica to Heart of Midlothian, Free
- 11 August 2006 – Lee Martin from Manchester United to Rangers, Loan
- 11 August 2006 – Merouane Zemmama from Raja Casablanca to Hibernian, Free
- 14 August 2006 – Shelton Martis from Darlington to Hibernian, Free
- 15 August 2006 – Marius Zaliukas from FBK Kaunas to Heart of Midlothian, Loan
- 16 August 2006 – Phil Bardsley from Manchester United to Rangers, Loan
- 24 August 2006 – Lee Naylor from Wolverhampton Wanderers to Celtic, £600,000 (including Charles Mulgrew in exchange)
- 24 August 2006 – Jan Vennegoor of Hesselink from PSV Eindhoven to Celtic, £3.4m
- 29 August 2006 – Kęstutis Ivaškevičius from FBK Kaunas to Heart of Midlothian, Season loan
- 29 August 2006 – Andrius Velicka from FBK Kaunas to Heart of Midlothian, Season loan
- 29 August 2006 – Anthony Stokes from Arsenal to Falkirk, Loan
- 30 August 2006 – Thomas Gravesen from Real Madrid to Celtic, £2m
- 31 August 2006 – Saša Papac from Austria Wien to Rangers, £450,000
- 10 October 2006 – Lee Wilkie from Unattached to Dundee United, Free

==== Out ====
- 23 May 2006 – Peter Løvenkrands from Rangers to Schalke 04, Bosman
- 2 June 2006 – David McNamee from Livingston to Coventry City, £100,000
- 26 June 2006 – John Hartson from Celtic to West Bromwich Albion, Undisclosed
- 30 June 2006 – Steven Hammell from Motherwell to Southend United, Bosman
- 1 July 2006 – Kevin McNaughton from Aberdeen to Cardiff City, Bosman
- 29 July 2006 – Rudolf Skácel from Heart of Midlothian to Southampton, £1.6m
- 2 August 2006 – Jamie McAllister from Heart of Midlothian to Bristol City, Free
- 2 August 2006 – Chris Hackett from Heart of Midlothian to Millwall, Free
- 7 August 2006 – Adam Virgo from Celtic to Coventry City, Season loan
- 9 August 2006 – Lee Johnson from Heart of Midlothian to Bristol City, Free
- 11 August 2006 – Mohammed Camara from Celtic to Derby County, Free
- 14 August 2006 – Fernando Ricksen from Rangers to Zenit Saint Petersburg, Season loan
- 26 August 2006 – Hamed Namouchi from Rangers to FC Lorient, £500,000
- 30 August 2006 – Stilian Petrov from Celtic to Aston Villa, £6.5m
- 31 August 2006 – Stanislav Varga from Celtic to Sunderland, Undisclosed
- 31 August 2006 – Ross Wallace from Celtic to Sunderland, Undisclosed
- 28 November 2006 – Fernando Ricksen from Rangers to Zenit Saint Petersburg, £1m

=== 2007 ===
Celtic further strengthened their squad with the signings of Paul Hartley from Hearts and Mark Brown from Inverness, while Steven Pressley was also signed after being released by Hearts. Shaun Maloney joined Aston Villa after contract negotiations broke down. New Rangers manager Walter Smith brought in defenders David Weir, Andy Webster and Ugo Ehiogu and spent £2m on Hibs' highly rated midfielder Kevin Thomson. Hearts looked to boost their European qualification hopes with the signing of a further four players on loan from FBK Kaunas as well as Laryea Kingston from Terek Grozny. New Dunfermline boss Stephen Kenny brought in loan signings James O'Brien from Celtic, Adam Hammill from Liverpool and Stephen Glass from Hibs with the club bottom of the SPL.

==== Domestic ====
- 1 January 2007 – Morgaro Gomis from Cowdenbeath to Dundee United, Nominal fee
- 2 January 2007 – Ryan Stevenson from St Johnstone to Ayr United, Undisclosed
- 5 January 2007 – James O'Brien from Celtic to Dunfermline Athletic, Loan
- 6 January 2007 – Stephen Dobbie from St Johnstone to Queen of the South, Undisclosed
- 8 January 2007 – David Templeton from Stenhousemuir to Heart of Midlothian, £30,000
- 11 January 2007 – Markus Paatelainen from Cowdenbeath to Inverness Caledonian Thistle, Undisclosed
- 11 January 2007 – Paul McHale from Clyde to Dundee, Free
- 18 January 2007 – Mark Brown from Inverness Caledonian Thistle to Celtic, Undisclosed
- 19 January 2007 – Derek Carcary from Rangers to Raith Rovers, Free
- 25 January 2007 – Stephen Glass from Hibernian to Dunfermline Athletic, Loan
- 26 January 2007 – Stuart Golabek from Inverness Caledonian Thistle to Livingston, Loan
- 26 January 2007 – Derek Lilley from Morton to St Johnstone, Free
- 26 January 2007 – Jamie Mole from Heart of Midlothian to Livingston, Loan
- 26 January 2007 – Matthew Doherty from Heart of Midlothian to Cowdenbeath, Loan
- 26 January 2007 – Jamie MacDonald from Heart of Midlothian to Queen of the South, Loan
- 27 January 2007 – Willie Gibson from Queen of the South to Kilmarnock, Undisclosed
- 27 January 2007 – Willie Gibson from Kilmarnock to Queen of the South, Loan
- 27 January 2007 – Stevie Murray from Kilmarnock to Queen of the South, Loan
- 27 January 2007 – Jamie Adams from Kilmarnock to Queen of the South, Loan
- 30 January 2007 – Kevin Thomson from Hibernian to Rangers, £2m
- 31 January 2007 – Stephen O'Donnell from Clyde to St Mirren, Undisclosed
- 31 January 2007 – Eddie Malone from Clyde to St Mirren, Undisclosed
- 31 January 2007 – Kyle Macaulay from Aberdeen to Peterhead, Undisclosed
- 31 January 2007 – Paul Hartley from Heart of Midlothian to Celtic, Undisclosed
- 31 January 2007 – Alan Archibald from Dundee United to Partick Thistle, Free
- 31 January 2007 – Robert Snodgrass from Livingston to Stirling Albion, Loan
- 31 January 2007 – Steve Tosh from Gretna to Queen of the South, Free
- 6 March 2007 – Zbigniew Malkowski from Hibernian to Gretna, Loan

==== In ====
- 1 January 2007 – Steven Pressley from Unattached to Celtic, Free
- 1 January 2007 – Craig Brewster from Unattached to Aberdeen, Free
- 1 January 2007 – Dean Holden from Peterborough United to Falkirk, Undisclosed
- 1 January 2007 – Danny Murphy from Cork City to Motherwell, Undisclosed
- 1 January 2007 – Trevor Molloy from St Patrick's Athletic to Motherwell, Undisclosed
- 1 January 2007 – Paul Keegan from St Patrick's Athletic to Motherwell, Undisclosed
- 1 January 2007 – Mark McChrystal from Derry City to Partick Thistle, Undisclosed
- 1 January 2007 – Derek McInnes from Millwall to St Johnstone, Free
- 3 January 2007 – Dumitru Copil from Atletico Arad to Heart of Midlothian, Free
- 5 January 2007 – Andrew Webster from Wigan Athletic to Rangers, Loan
- 5 January 2007 – Jon Daly from Hartlepool United to Dundee United, Undisclosed
- 6 January 2007 – Eduardas Kurskis from FBK Kaunas to Heart of Midlothian, Undisclosed
- 6 January 2007 – Arkadiusz Klimek from FBK Kaunas to Heart of Midlothian, Undisclosed
- 9 January 2007 – Steven Hogg from Shrewsbury Town to Gretna, Loan
- 11 January 2007 – Sean Dillon from Shelbourne to Dundee United, Undisclosed
- 11 January 2007 – Momo Sylla from Leicester City to Kilmarnock, Free
- 11 January 2007 – Kasper Schmeichel from Manchester City to Falkirk, Loan
- 11 January 2007 – Kevin Smith from Sunderland to Dundee, Free
- 13 January 2007 – Bobby Ryan from Shelbourne to Dunfermline Athletic, Undisclosed
- 16 January 2007 – David Weir from Everton to Rangers, Free
- 18 January 2007 – Adam Hammill from Liverpool to Dunfermline Athletic, Loan
- 19 January 2007 – Filipe Morais from Millwall to St Johnstone, Loan
- 25 January 2007 – Ugo Ehiogu from Middlesbrough to Rangers, Free
- 25 January 2007 – Jean-Joël Perrier-Doumbé from Stade Rennais to Celtic, Loan
- 27 January 2007 – Jamie Harris from Shelbourne to Dunfermline Athletic, Free
- 30 January 2007 – Kevin Thomson from Hibernian to Rangers, £2m
- 31 January 2007 – Krisztian Vadocz from Auxerre to Motherwell, Loan
- 31 January 2007 – Linas Pilibaitis from FBK Kaunas to Heart of Midlothian, Loan
- 31 January 2007 – Tomas Kancelskis from FBK Kaunas to Heart of Midlothian, Loan
- 31 January 2007 – Laryea Kingston from Terek Grozny to Heart of Midlothian, Loan
- 6 February 2007 – Thomas Sowunmi from Unattached to Hibernian, Free
- 14 March 2007 – Shana Haji from Real Zaragoza to Hibernian, Free

==== Out ====
- 1 January 2007 – Moses Ashikodi from Rangers to Watford, Nominal fee
- 11 January 2007 – Stephen Pearson from Celtic to Derby County, £750,000
- 11 January 2007 – Julien Rodriguez from Rangers to Olympique de Marseille, Free
- 12 January 2007 – Alan Thompson from Celtic to Leeds United, Loan
- 17 January 2007 – David Marshall from Celtic to Norwich City, Loan
- 22 January 2007 – Oumar Konde from Hibernian to Panionios, Undisclosed
- 23 January 2007 – Dany N'Guessan from Rangers to Lincoln City, Free
- 25 January 2007 – Jérémy Clément from Rangers to Paris Saint-Germain, £1.8m
- 30 January 2007 – Lionel Letizi from Rangers to OGC Nice, Free
- 31 January 2007 – Richie Foran from Motherwell to Southend United, £200,000
- 31 January 2007 – Simon Lappin from St Mirren to Norwich City, £100,000
- 31 January 2007 – Kenny Deuchar from Gretna to Northampton Town, Loan
- 31 January 2007 – Shaun Maloney from Celtic to Aston Villa, £1m

== Managerial changes ==
Team	Outgoing manager	Manner of departure	Date of vacancy	Replaced by	Date of appointment
Motherwell	(England) Terry Butcher	Resigned	17 May 2006	(Scotland) Maurice Malpas	4 August 2006
Dundee	(Republic of Ireland) Alan Kernaghan	Sacked	20 April 2006	(Scotland) Alex Rae	24 May 2006
Raith Rovers	(Scotland) Gordon Dalziel	Mutual consent	1 September 2006	(Scotland) Craig Levein	5 September 2006
Hibernian	(England) Tony Mowbray	Resigned	13 October 2006	(Scotland) John Collins	31 October 2006
Cowdenbeath	(Finland) Mixu Paatelainen	Resigned	21 October 2006	(Scotland) Brian Welsh	30 October 2006
Dunfermline Athletic	(Scotland) Jim Leishman	Resigned	26 October 2006	(Republic of Ireland) Stephen Kenny	18 November 2006
Dundee United	(Scotland) Craig Brewster	Sacked	29 October 2006	(Scotland) Craig Levein	30 October 2006
Raith Rovers	(Scotland) Craig Levein	Resigned	30 October 2006	(Scotland) John McGlynn	20 November 2006
Stenhousemuir	(Scotland) Des McKeown	Resigned	1 November 2006	(Scotland) Campbell Money	10 November 2006
Airdrie United	(Scotland) Sandy Stewart	Sacked	13 November 2006	(Scotland) Kenny Black	17 November 2006
Rangers	(France) Paul Le Guen	Mutual consent	4 January 2007	(Scotland) Walter Smith	10 January 2007
Scotland	(Scotland) Walter Smith	Resigned	10 January 2007	(Scotland) Alex McLeish	29 January 2007
Montrose	(Scotland) David Robertson	Resigned	17 January 2007	(Scotland) Jim Weir	8 February 2007
Ayr United	(Scotland) Bobby Connor	Sacked	26 February 2007	(Scotland) Neil Watt	22 March 2007
Heart of Midlothian	(Lithuania) Valdas Ivanauskas	Mutual consent	20 March 2007	(Ukraine) Anatoly Korobochka	30 July 2007
Partick Thistle	(Scotland) Dick Campbell	Sacked	27 March 2007	(Scotland) Ian McCall	25 May 2007
Livingston	(Scotland) John Robertson	Sacked	15 April 2007	(England) Mark Proctor	23 May 2007
Queen of the South	(Scotland) Ian McCall	Resigned	28 April 2007	(Scotland) Gordon Chisholm	7 May 2007
Ross County	(Scotland) Scott Leitch	Resigned	30 April 2007	(Scotland) Dick Campbell	17 May 2007
Albion Rovers	(Scotland) Jim Chapman	Sacked	7 May 2007	(Scotland) John McCormack	31 May 2007

== League competitions ==
=== Scottish Premier League ===
Pos	Team	Pld	W	D	L	GF	GA	GD	Pts	Qualification or relegation (Note: Teams played each other three times (33 matches), before the league split into two groups (the top six and the bottom six) for the last five matches.)
1	Celtic (C)	38	26	6	6	65	34	+31	84	Qualification for the Champions League third qualifying round
2	Rangers	38	21	9	8	61	32	+29	72	Qualification for the Champions League second qualifying round
3	Aberdeen	38	19	8	11	55	38	+17	65	Qualification for the UEFA Cup first round
4	Heart of Midlothian	38	17	10	11	47	35	+12	61	
5	Kilmarnock	38	16	7	15	47	54	−7	55	
6	Hibernian	38	13	10	15	56	46	+10	49	
7	Falkirk	38	15	5	18	49	47	+2	50	
8	Inverness Caledonian Thistle	38	11	13	14	42	48	−6	46	
9	Dundee United	38	10	12	16	40	59	−19	42	
10	Motherwell	38	10	8	20	41	61	−20	38	
11	St Mirren	38	8	12	18	31	51	−20	36	
12	Dunfermline Athletic (R)	38	8	8	22	26	55	−29	32	Relegation to the Scottish First Division and qualification for UEFA Cup second qualifying round (Note: As Celtic, the Scottish Cup winners, qualified for the Champions League via their league position, the place in the UEFA Cup was passed to Dunfermline Athletic, the cup runner-up.)

Source: Scottish Professional Football League
Rules for classification: 1) Points; 2) Goal difference; 3) Goals scored
(C) Champions; (R) Relegated

=== Scottish First Division ===
Pos	Team	Pld	W	D	L	GF	GA	GD	Pts	Promotion, qualification or relegation
1	Gretna (C, P)	36	19	9	8	70	40	+30	66	Promotion to the Premier League
2	St Johnstone	36	19	8	9	65	42	+23	65	
3	Dundee	36	16	5	15	48	42	+6	53	
4	Hamilton Academical	36	14	11	11	46	47	−1	53	
5	Clyde	36	11	14	11	46	35	+11	47	
6	Livingston	36	11	12	13	41	46	−5	45	
7	Partick Thistle	36	12	9	15	47	63	−16	45	
8	Queen of the South	36	10	11	15	34	54	−20	41	
9	Airdrie United (R)	36	11	7	18	39	50	−11	40	Qualification for the First Division Play-offs
10	Ross County (R)	36	9	10	17	40	57	−17	37	Relegation to the Second Division

Source: "2006-2007 First Division - SPFL Archive". SPFL.
Rules for classification: 1) points; 2) goal difference; 3) number of goals scored.
(C) Champions; (P) Promoted; (R) Relegated

=== Scottish Second Division ===
Pos	Team	Pld	W	D	L	GF	GA	GD	Pts	Promotion, qualification or relegation
1	Greenock Morton (C, P)	36	24	5	7	76	32	+44	77	Promotion to the First Division
2	Stirling Albion (P)	36	21	6	9	67	39	+28	69	Qualification for the First Division Play-offs (Note: The 2nd, 3rd and 4th placed teams will be entered into a play-off with the First Division's 9th placed team. The winning team were awarded a place in the 2007–08 First Division, Airdrie United were relegated and Stirling Albion were promoted.)
3	Raith Rovers	36	18	8	10	50	33	+17	62	Qualification for the First Division Play-offs
4	Brechin City	36	18	6	12	61	45	+16	60	Qualification for the First Division Play-offs
5	Ayr United	36	14	8	14	46	47	−1	50	
6	Cowdenbeath	36	13	6	17	59	56	+3	45	
7	Alloa Athletic	36	11	9	16	47	70	−23	42	
8	Peterhead	36	11	8	17	60	62	−2	41	
9	Stranraer (R)	36	10	9	17	45	74	−29	39	Qualification for the Second Division Play-offs (Note: The 9th placed team were entered into a play-off with the Third Division's 2nd, 3rd and 4th placed teams. The winning team were awarded a place in the 2007–08 Second Division, Stranraer were relegated and Queen's Park were promoted.)
10	Forfar Athletic (R)	36	4	7	25	37	90	−53	19	Relegation to the Third Division

Source: "2006–2007 Second Division - SPFL Archive". SPFL (in Malay).
Rules for classification: 1) points; 2) goal difference; 3) number of goals scored.
(C) Champions; (P) Promoted; (R) Relegated

=== Scottish Third Division ===
Pos	Team	Pld	W	D	L	GF	GA	GD	Pts	Promotion or qualification
1	Berwick Rangers (C, P)	36	24	3	9	51	29	+22	75	Promotion to the Second Division
2	Arbroath	36	22	4	10	61	33	+28	70	Qualification for the Second Division Play-offs (Note: The 2nd, 3rd and 4th placed teams will be entered into a play-off with the Second Division's 9th placed team. The winning team will be awarded a place in the 2007–08 Second Division, Stranraer were relegated and Queen's Park were promoted.)
3	Queen's Park (O, P)	36	21	5	10	57	28	+29	68	Qualification for the Second Division Play-offs
4	East Fife	36	20	7	9	59	37	+22	67	Qualification for the Second Division Play-offs
5	Dumbarton	36	18	5	13	52	37	+15	59	
6	Albion Rovers	36	14	6	16	56	61	−5	48	
7	Stenhousemuir	36	13	5	18	53	63	−10	44	
8	Montrose	36	11	4	21	42	62	−20	37	
9	Elgin City	36	9	2	25	39	69	−30	29	
10	East Stirlingshire	36	6	3	27	27	78	−51	21	

Source: Soccerway
Rules for classification: 1) points; 2) goal difference; 3) number of goals scored.
(C) Champions; (O) Play-off winners; (P) Promoted

== Cup honours ==
Competition	Winner	Score	Runner-up	Report
Scottish Cup 2006–07	Celtic	1 – 0	Dunfermline Athletic	Wikipedia article
League Cup 2006–07	Hibernian	5 – 1	Kilmarnock	Wikipedia article
Challenge Cup 2006–07	Ross County	1 – 1 (a.e.t.) (5 – 4 pen.)	Clyde	Wikipedia article
Youth Cup	Rangers	5 – 0	Celtic	
Junior Cup 2006–07	Linlithgow Rose	2 – 1 (a.e.t.)	Kelty Hearts	The Herald

== Non-league honours ==
=== Senior honours ===
Competition	Winner
Highland League 2006–07	Keith
East of Scotland League	Annan Athletic
South of Scotland League	Threave Rovers

=== Junior honours ===
==== West Region ====
Division	Winner
Premier League	Pollok
Division One	Irvine Meadow XI
Ayrshire League	Kilbirnie Ladeside
Central League Division One	Kirkintilloch Rob Roy
Central League Division Two	Ashfield

==== East Region ====
Division	Winner
Super League	Linlithgow Rose
Premier League	Glenrothes
North Division	Forfar West End
Central Division	Dundonald Bluebell
South Division	Newtongrange Star

==== North Region ====
Division	Winner
Premier League	Culter
Division One	East End
Division Two	Fochabers

== Individual honours ==
=== SPFA awards ===
Award	Winner	Team
Players' Player of the Year	(Japan) Shunsuke Nakamura	Celtic
Young Player of the Year	(Scotland) Steven Naismith	Kilmarnock
Manager of the Year	(Scotland) Gordon Strachan	Celtic

=== SWFA awards ===
Award	Winner	Team
Footballer of the Year	(Japan) Shunsuke Nakamura	Celtic
Young player of the Year	(Scotland) Scott Brown	Hibernian
Manager of the Year	(Scotland) Gordon Strachan	Celtic

== Scottish clubs in Europe ==
=== Summary ===
Club	Competition(s)	Progress	Coef.
Celtic	UEFA Champions League	Round of 16	11.00
Heart of Midlothian	UEFA Champions League; UEFA Cup	Third qualifying round First round	2.50
Rangers	UEFA Cup	Round of 16	13.00
Gretna	UEFA Cup	Second qualifying round	0.50
Hibernian	UEFA Intertoto Cup	Third round	N/A

Average coefficient – 6.750

=== Celtic ===
Date	Venue	Opponents	Score	Celtic scorer(s)	Report
Champions League Group stage
13 September	Old Trafford, Manchester (A)	(England) Manchester United	2–3	Jan Vennegoor of Hesselink, Shunsuke Nakamura	BBC Sport
26 September	Celtic Park, Glasgow (H)	(Denmark) FC Copenhagen	1–0	Kenny Miller (pen.)	BBC Sport
17 October	Celtic Park, Glasgow (H)	(Portugal) Benfica	3–0	Kenny Miller (2), Stephen Pearson	BBC Sport
1 November	Estádio da Luz, Lisbon (A)	(Portugal) Benfica	0–3		BBC Sport
21 November	Celtic Park, Glasgow (H)	(England) Manchester United (H)	1–0	Shunsuke Nakamura	BBC Sport
6 December	Parken Stadium, Copenhagen (A)	(Denmark) FC Copenhagen	1–3	Jiří Jarošík	BBC Sport
Champions League Round of 16
20 February	Celtic Park, Glasgow (H)	(Italy) A.C. Milan	0–0		BBC Sport
7 March	San Siro, Milan (A)	(Italy) A.C. Milan	0–1 (a.e.t.)		BBC Sport

=== Heart of Midlothian ===
Date	Venue	Opponents	Score	Hearts scorer(s)	Report
Champions League Second qualifying round
26 July	Murrayfield Stadium, Edinburgh (H)	(Bosnia and Herzegovina) NK Široki Brijeg	3–0	Branimir Anic (o.g.), Ibrahim Tall, Roman Bednář	BBC Sport
2 August	Pecara Stadium, Široki Brijeg (A)	(Bosnia and Herzegovina) NK Široki Brijeg	0–0		BBC Sport
Champions League Third qualifying round
9 August	Murrayfield Stadium, Edinburgh (H)	(Greece) AEK Athens	1–2	Saulius Mikoliunas	BBC Sport
23 August	Olympic Stadium, Athens (A)	(Greece) AEK Athens	0–3		BBC Sport
UEFA Cup First round
14 September	Murrayfield Stadium, Edinburgh (H)	(Czech Republic) Sparta Prague	0–2		BBC Sport
28 September	AXA Arena, Prague (A)	(Czech Republic) Sparta Prague	0–0		BBC Sport

=== Rangers ===
Date	Venue	Opponents	Score	Rangers scorer(s)	Report
UEFA Cup First round
14 September	Aker stadion, Molde (A)	(Norway) Molde FK	0–0		BBC Sport
28 September	Ibrox Stadium, Glasgow (H)	(Norway) Molde FK	2–0	Thomas Buffel, Barry Ferguson	BBC Sport
UEFA Cup Group stage
19 October	Stadio Armando Picchi, Livorno (A)	(Italy) Livorno	3–2	Charlie Adam, Kris Boyd (pen.), Nacho Novo	BBC Sport
2 November	Ibrox Stadium, Glasgow (H)	(Israel) Maccabi Haifa	2–0	Nacho Novo, Charlie Adam (pen.)	BBC Sport
23 November	Stade de l'Abbé-Deschamps, Auxerre (A)	(France) Auxerre	2–2	Nacho Novo, Kris Boyd	BBC Sport
14 December	Ibrox Stadium, Glasgow (H)	(Serbia and Montenegro) Partizan Belgrade	1–0	Alan Hutton	BBC Sport
UEFA Cup Round of 32
14 February	Bloomfield Stadium, Tel Aviv (A)	(Israel) Hapoel Tel Aviv	1–2	Nacho Novo	BBC Sport
22 February	Ibrox Stadium, Glasgow (H)	(Israel) Hapoel Tel Aviv	4–0	Barry Ferguson (2), Kris Boyd, Charlie Adam	BBC Sport
UEFA Cup Round of 16
8 March	Ibrox Stadium, Glasgow (H)	(Spain) Osasuna	1–1	Brahim Hemdani	BBC Sport
14 March	Estadio Reyno de Navarra, Pamplona (A)	(Spain) Osasuna	0–1		BBC Sport

=== Gretna ===
Date	Venue	Opponents	Score	Gretna scorer(s)	Report
UEFA Cup Second qualifying round
10 August	Fir Park, Motherwell (H)	(Republic of Ireland) Derry City	1–5	Ryan McGuffie	BBC Sport
24 August	Brandywell Stadium, Derry (A)	(Republic of Ireland) Derry City	2–2	David Graham, Ryan Baldacchino	BBC Sport

=== Hibernian ===
Date	Venue	Opponents	Score	Hibernian scorer(s)	Report
UEFA Intertoto Cup Second round
2 July	Easter Road, Edinburgh (H)	(Latvia) Dinaburg	5–0	Chris Killen, Scott Brown, Ivan Sproule, David Murphy, Steven Fletcher	BBC Sport
8 July	Celtnieks Stadium, Daugavpils (A)	(Latvia) Dinaburg	3–0	Amadou Konte (2), Ivan Sproule	BBC Sport
UEFA Intertoto Cup Third round
15 July	Fionia Park, Odense (A)	(Denmark) Odense BK	0–1		BBC Sport
22 July	Easter Road, Edinburgh (H)	(Denmark) Odense BK	2–1	Rob Jones, Paul Dalglish	BBC Sport

== Scotland national team ==
Date	Venue	Opponents	Score	Competition	Scotland scorer(s)	Report
2 September	Celtic Park, Glasgow (H)	Faroe Islands	6–0	ECQ(B)	Darren Fletcher, James McFadden, Kris Boyd (2, 1 pen.), Kenny Miller (pen.), Garry O'Connor	BBC Sport
6 September	S Dariaus ir S.Gireno SC, Kaunas (A)	Lithuania	2–1	ECQ(B)	Christian Dailly, Kenny Miller	BBC Sport
7 October	Hampden Park, Glasgow (H)	France	1–0	ECQ(B)	Gary Caldwell	BBC Sport
11 October	Olympic Stadium, Kyiv (A)	Ukraine	0–2	ECQ(B)		BBC Sport
24 March	Hampden Park, Glasgow (H)	Georgia	2–1	ECQ(B)	Kris Boyd, Craig Beattie	BBC Sport
28 March	Stadio San Nicola, Bari (A)	Italy	0–2	ECQ(B)		BBC Sport
30 May	Gerhard Hanappi Stadium, Vienna (A)	Austria	1–0	Friendly	Garry O'Connor	BBC Sport
6 June	Svangaskard Stadium, Toftir (A)	Faroe Islands	2–0	ECQ(B)	Shaun Maloney, Garry O'Connor	BBC Sport

Key

- (H) = Home match
- (A) = Away match
- ECQ(B) = European Championship qualifying (Group B)

== Deaths ==
- 18 July: Jimmy Leadbetter, 78, Ipswich Town winger.
- 21 July: Bert Slater, 70, Falkirk and Dundee goalkeeper.
- 5 November: Bobby Shearer, 74, Rangers, Hamilton and Scotland defender; Queen of the South manager.
- 13 May: Kai Johansen, 66, Morton and Rangers defender.
