= Gordon Chisholm =

Scottish footballer and manager

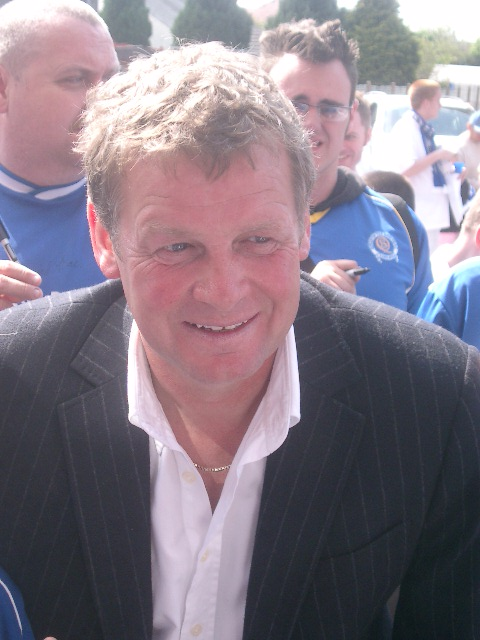
- Chisholm outside Palmerston Park, Dumfries.

Personal information
- Full name: Gordon William Chisholm
- Date of birth: 8 April 1960 (age 66)
- Place of birth: Glasgow, Scotland
- Position: Central defender

Senior career*
Years	Team	Apps	(Gls)
1978–1985	Sunderland	197	(10)
1985–1987	Hibernian	59	(4)
1987–1992	Dundee	155	(15)
1992	Partick Thistle	9	(0)

Managerial career
- 2005–2006: Dundee United
- 2007–2010: Queen of the South
- 2010: Dundee
- * Club domestic league appearances and goals

Gordon William Chisholm (born 8 April 1960 in Glasgow) is a Scottish professional football former player and manager. Chisholm played as a central defender for Sunderland, Hibernian, Dundee and Partick Thistle.

After retiring as a player, Chisholm became a coach, working in some of his roles as assistant to Ian McCall. Chisholm succeeded McCall as manager of Dundee United in 2005, and guided the club to the 2005 Scottish Cup Final, which they lost 1–0 to Celtic. He was sacked the following season, however, and was subsequently appointed manager of Scottish First Division club Queen of the South. Chisholm guided the club to the 2008 Scottish Cup Final, which they lost 3–2 to Rangers. Chisholm left Queens in 2010 to manage Dundee, but was made redundant when the club went into administration in October 2010.

== Playing career ==
=== In England ===
Chisholm started his career at Sunderland where he spent seven years and was a member of the side that reached the final of the Football League Cup in March 1985, where they lost 1–0 to Norwich City. Unfortunately for Chisholm, he deflected Asa Hartford's shot into the net for Norwich's winning goal.

=== In Scotland ===
Chisholm moved back to Scotland later that year, when he joined Hibernian for a £65,000 fee. He scored a goal on his Hibs debut, a Scottish League Cup semi-final win against Rangers. This meant that Chisholm achieved the unusual feat of playing in League Cup Finals in the same calendar year in both England and Scotland. Unfortunately for Chisholm, both finals were lost, as Hibs lost 3–0 to Aberdeen. He later had spells at Dundee and Partick Thistle before retiring in 1992. Chisholm was a "tall, commanding central defender" who "could also play in the holding midfield role".

== Managerial career ==
=== Early managerial career ===
Chisholm had assistant manager roles at Partick Thistle, Clydebank, Ross County, Airdrie, Falkirk and Dundee United, primarily working with Ian McCall.

=== Dundee United ===
Chisholm was appointed as caretaker manager of Dundee United on 14 March 2005, following the sacking of Ian McCall. Chisholm suffered 3–2 defeats against both Celtic and Hibernian in his first two matches in charge. The following week, however, Chisholm's team triumphed over Hibernian, Rangers and Hearts. United then went on to end a run of eight games over three years without a win against neighbours Dundee, with goals by Mark Wilson and Jim McIntyre sealing a 2–1 win. These results meant that Chisholm won the SPL manager of the month award in his first full month in charge of the team (April 2005). Chisholm's team then retained SPL status in dramatic style with a late Barry Robson penalty at Inverness on the final day of the season.

United's victory against Hibs meant that they reached the 2005 Scottish Cup Final, which they lost 1–0 against Celtic. As Celtic had already qualified for the UEFA Champions League, however, United qualified for the UEFA Cup. Chisholm was given the position of manager on a permanent basis on 24 May 2005. Despite spending considerable money on players such as Lee Miller, Dundee United were eliminated in the qualifying stage of the UEFA Cup by Finnish team MyPa. Poor league form and a 3–2 defeat against Aberdeen in the third round of the Scottish Cup, after having led 2–0, led to Chisholm being sacked on 10 January 2006 by Dundee United chairman Eddie Thompson.

=== Queen of the South ===
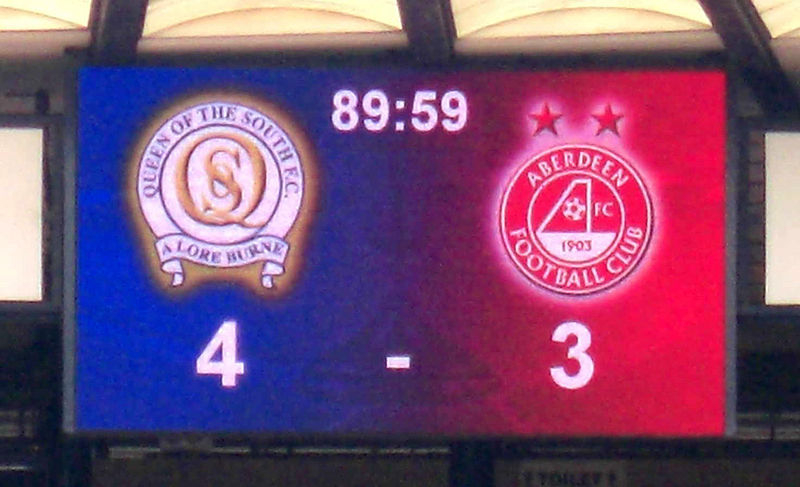
Semi final result on the scoreboard at Hampden Park

Chisholm again became Ian McCall's assistant, this time at Dumfries club Queen of the South, until McCall's departure from the club at the end of the 2006–07 season. Chisholm then accepted the role as manager, appointing Kenny Brannigan as his assistant manager. Chairman Davie Rae also announced that the club would become fully professional that season. In March 2008, Chisholm guided Queens to only their second ever Scottish Cup semi-final appearance with a 2–0 quarter final victory against Dundee, a game notable for a goal from 84 yards by Ryan McCann. Queens followed this with a 4–3 win against Aberdeen in the semi-final, which meant that Chisholm had guided Queens to their first ever Scottish Cup Final appearance. Despite second half Queens goals by Steve Tosh and Jim Thomson, Rangers ran out 3–2 winners in the Final. Queens finished fourth in the Scottish First Division.

As Rangers had already qualified for the 2008–09 UEFA Champions League through their league position, Queens entered the 2008–09 UEFA Cup competition. They were drawn in a qualification round against Danish club FC Nordsjælland. The first leg, hosted at the Excelsior Stadium in Airdrie, was played in a quagmire with the Danes running out 2–1 winners. Queens delivered a stronger performance in the return leg, controlling most of the game but with only one goal to show for their superiority. With a 1–0 victory of no value in an aggregate result due to the away goals rule and Queens pushing all out for the second goal, the Danes took advantage to score two goals in the last five minutes. Chisholm's team selection for the UEFA Cup ties caused some surprise. With Stephen Dobbie the most prolific striker at the club in a generation, Chisholm started with Dobbie on the bench for both ties instead preferring the workmanlike Stewart Kean.

A strong start to the 2008–09 league campaign saw the club sitting top of the table in October. At the same time, Chisholm was linked with the vacant position at Dundee, but Davie Rae refused Chisholm permission to talk to the Dark Blues. This coincided with Queens losing form, as they gained only three draws from the next 12 games placing them only one place above bottom. Their form improved in the latter part of the season and the club finished in mid-table.

The 2009–10 season progressed in a similar fashion to the season before. Queens were top of the table, but poorer results followed that dragged the club into a mid table position. The club also suffered a 4–0 defeat in the Scottish Cup against Airdrie. Chisholm applied for the vacant managerial position at Kilmarnock, but the job was taken by Jimmy Calderwood. Two months later, Chisholm was offered the vacant position at Dundee. Chisholm made the following comments after leaving QoS:

I had an excellent working relationship with Chairman Davie Rae, a person I always had a tremendous respect for. I'll always remember the great support shown by Queens' fans over the past two and a half years and the players themselves have been fantastic and a pleasure to work with. We had some great times getting to the Scottish Cup Final at Hampden and playing in Europe and those memories will live with me for the rest of my life. I'd just like to add a big 'thank you' to all at Queen of the South and wish them all the best for the future. And I genuinely mean that!

=== Dundee ===
Chisholm took the Dundee job while they were top of the First Division, although the club had just sacked Jocky Scott after going four games without a win. Chisholm said ahead of his first game in charge, "It was an opportunity I just couldn't pass by at my time of life, but it will be a strange experience being on opposite sides tomorrow night." Chisholm was the first person to manage both major Dundee clubs. Billy Dodds, who was the Queen of the South strikers coach under Chisholm, joined him at Dens Park as his assistant.

Dundee failed to win promotion at the end of the 2009–10 season and entered administration a few months later. The administrator made Chisholm and Dodds redundant the following day.

=== East Fife ===
After leaving Dundee in October 2010 and spending over a year out of professional football, Chisholm set up an estate agent business with his wife. In March 2012, Chisholm was appointed assistant manager of East Fife by Gordon Durie on a part-time basis. After Durie took ill during a game, Chisholm took control of the team. He resigned from his position at East Fife in October 2012 due to the pressures of combining both tasks and commuting from Lenzie to Methil. Chisholm was then appointed as international development coach with Sunderland.

== Honours ==
Sunderland

- Football League Cup runner-up: 1984–85
