= Stephen Dobbie =

Scottish footballer (born 1982)

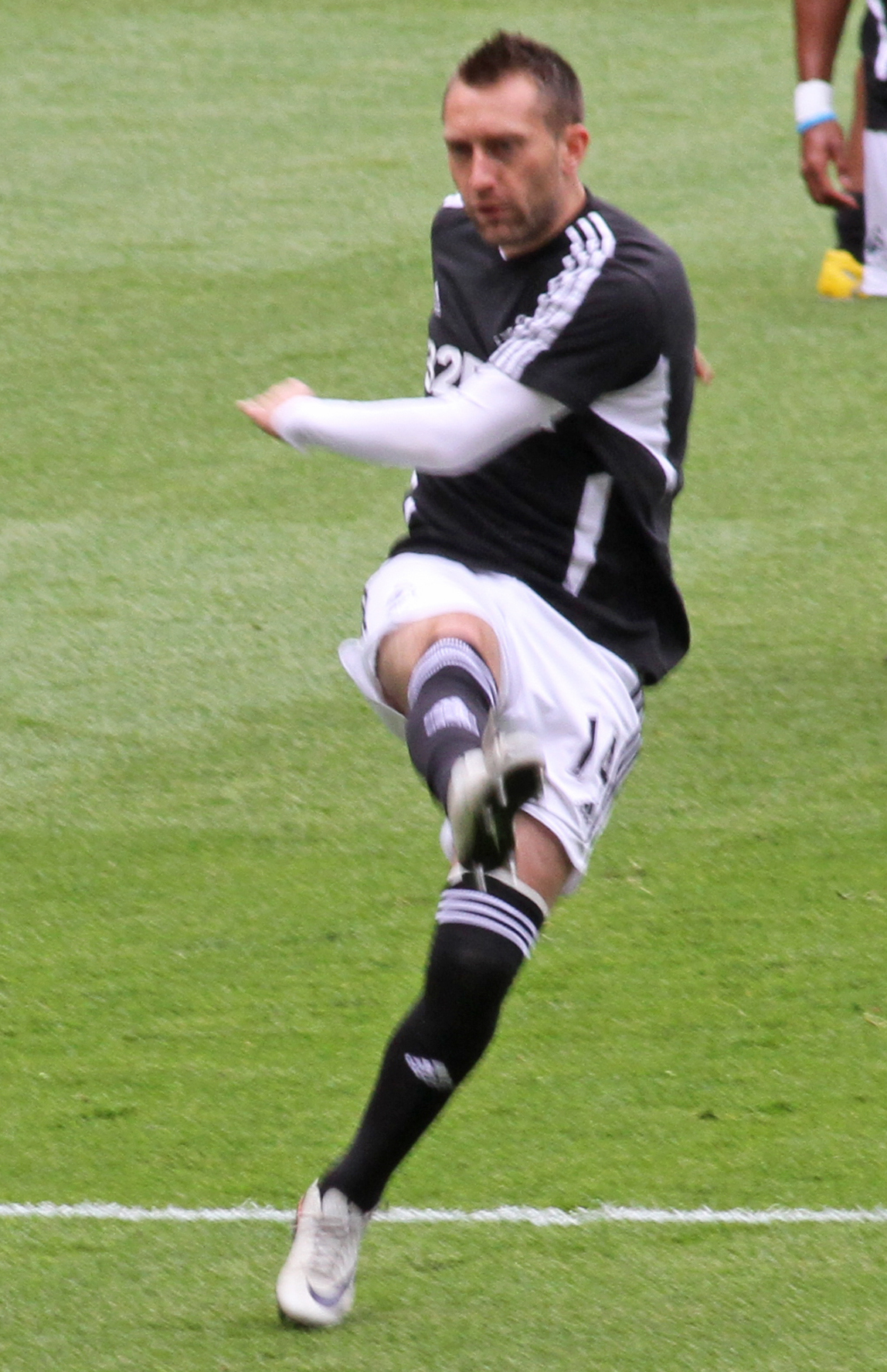
- Dobbie in 2011

Personal information
- Full name: Stephen Dobbie
- Date of birth: 5 December 1982 (age 43)
- Place of birth: Glasgow, Scotland
- Height: 5 ft 8 in (1.73 m)
- Position: Striker

Team information
- Current team: Blackpool (first-team coach)

Youth career
- 2000–2002: Rangers

Senior career*
Years	Team	Apps	(Gls)
2002–2003	Rangers	0	(0)
2002	→ Northern Spirit (loan)	3	(0)
2003–2005	Hibernian	35	(2)
2005	→ St Johnstone (loan)	8	(2)
2005–2007	St Johnstone	20	(1)
2006–2007	→ Dumbarton (loan)	17	(10)
2007–2009	Queen of the South	84	(47)
2009–2012	Swansea City	55	(9)
2010	→ Blackpool (loan)	16	(4)
2012	→ Blackpool (loan)	7	(5)
2012–2013	Brighton & Hove Albion	15	(2)
2013	→ Crystal Palace (loan)	15	(3)
2013–2015	Crystal Palace	1	(0)
2013–2014	→ Blackpool (loan)	15	(2)
2014	→ Blackpool (loan)	12	(2)
2014–2015	→ Fleetwood Town (loan)	27	(4)
2015–2016	Bolton Wanderers	24	(4)
2016–2021	Queen of the South	138	(69)
2021–2022	AFC Fylde	15	(3)
Total		507	(169)

Managerial career
- 2021–2022: AFC Fylde (U18)
- 2023: Blackpool (interim)
- 2025: Blackpool (interim)
- * Club domestic league appearances and goals as of 15:21, 24 May 2022 (UTC)

Stephen Dobbie (born 5 December 1982) is a Scottish former professional footballer. He is currently a first-team coach with Blackpool.

He started his career in the 2002–03 season at Rangers, followed by spells at Hibernian and St Johnstone. His career was revived by a loan spell at Dumbarton in 2006, and he then scored 55 goals in 105 appearances for Queen of the South in his first spell at Palmerston Park, playing in the club's first-ever appearance in the Scottish Cup final in 2008.

Dobbie moved to Swansea City in 2009. The following year, he was loaned to Blackpool, with whom he won promotion to the Premier League via the 2010 play-offs. He achieved the same feat with Swansea, winning promotion to the Premier League via the 2011 play-offs. Dobbie was again loaned to Blackpool in 2012, and played in a third successive play-off final, this time as a runner-up. In 2012, he signed for Brighton & Hove Albion, before joining Crystal Palace, initially on loan, where he helped the Eagles to win promotion in 2013 to the Premier League.

Dobbie had a third spell on loan at Blackpool, and also played for Fleetwood Town and Bolton Wanderers, before returning to Scotland in August 2016 to sign for Queen of the South for a second spell. With the Doonhamers he scored a further 111 goals in 178 appearances. Overall, Dobbie scored 166 goals in 283 appearances. Dobbie is Queen of the South's second-highest goalscorer of all time and the club's record scorer for a single season (43 goals in the 2018–19 season). In 2021, after his release by Queen of the South, he made his return to Lancashire, signing for AFC Fylde in the National League North.

== Club career ==
=== Early career ===
Dobbie was with Hearts at age group level before moving to Rangers when he was twelve years old. At Rangers, he did not break into the first-team squad, despite being a prolific goalscorer in the reserves. In 2002, he was sent out on loan to Australian National Soccer League club Northern Spirit, scoring three goals in three league matches in the 2002–03 season. He was then transferred to Hibernian in 2003, having made no league appearances for the Ibrox club.

=== Hibernian ===
Dobbie debuted for the Hibees on 9 August 2003 as an 85th-minute substitute in a 2–1 win over Dundee United at Tannadice. After five substitute appearances, he had his first start on 23 September 2003, scoring a hat-trick in a 9–0 win over Montrose in the second round of the 2003–04 Scottish League Cup. His league debut arrived four days later in a 2–1 defeat to Celtic at Easter Road and scored his first league goal on 7 December 2003 in a 3–1 defeat to Aberdeen at Pittodrie Stadium.

On 5 February 2004, in the semi-final of that season's Scottish League Cup at Hampden Park against Rangers, Dobbie scored the equalising goal in the 79th minute. The match ended 1–1 after extra time, and Hibs won 4–3 on penalties. Despite this, Dobbie failed to win a regular place in the Hibernian first team as Garry O'Connor and Derek Riordan were preferred to him. He was a 70th-minute substitute in the 2004 Scottish League Cup Final defeat by Livingston; Hibs lost 2–0.

Dobbie made a total of 33 appearances, scoring six goals that season. On 3 July 2004, he made his European debut in the second round of the 2004 UEFA Intertoto Cup, as a 76th-minute substitute in a 1–1 draw with Lithuanian A Lyga club Vėtra at Easter Road. Dobbie then started the 2004–05 season with Hibernian, with seven league appearances and five cup appearances.

=== St Johnstone ===
A lack of opportunities at Hibernian under the management of Tony Mowbray meant that Dobbie was sent out on loan to Scottish First Division club St Johnstone on 26 January 2005. He debuted on 19 March 2005, as a 57th-minute substitute in a 2–0 defeat to Ross County at McDiarmid Park.

He scored his first goal for Saints in a 4–0 win over Partick Thistle at Firhill on 16 April 2005. He had eight appearances for the club that season, scoring two goals. The transfer to the Perth club was made permanent in the 2005 close season, with Dobbie making 27 appearances and scoring five goals in the 2005–06 season.

=== Dumbarton ===
Dobbie struggled to hold down a regular place in the first team, and the following season he was loaned out to Scottish Third Division club Dumbarton, where he found some form, scoring ten goals in seventeen league matches. Dobbie debuted on 19 August 2006 in a single-goal defeat to Queen's Park at Hampden Park.

His first goal arrived in his second match for the club in a 3–1 defeat to Inverness Caledonian Thistle at the Caledonian Stadium in the second round of the Scottish League Cup. Dobbie had 18 appearances on loan at the Sons, scoring eleven goals.

=== Queen of the South (first spell) ===
Dobbie's form at Dumbarton was noticed by Scottish First Division club Queen of the South, who signed him permanently from St Johnstone on 5 January 2007. Dobbie debuted the following day in a 1–1 draw at Dundee in the third round of the 2006–07 Scottish Cup at Dens Park. In the replay, a 3–3 draw at Palmerston ten days later, Dobbie scored his first two goals for the Dumfries club. Queens went on to win the tie 4–2 on penalties. After scoring another brace in a 4–3 home league win over Partick Thistle on 27 January 2007, Dobbie scored once again in the 2–0 fourth round win over Cowdenbeath in the Scottish Cup. Dobbie then grabbed a third brace on 17 February 2007 in a 3–0 win over Airdrie United at the Excelsior Stadium. Dobbie then played in the quarter final of the Scottish Cup as Queens were defeated 2–1 by his former club Hibernian. Dobbie scored 12 goals in 21 appearances that season.

On 19 January 2008, Dobbie scored his first hat-trick for Queen of the South against Greenock Morton in a 3–0 league win at Cappielow. The goals were scored in the 65th, 73rd and 84th minutes.

With Gordon Chisholm appointed manager for the 2007–08 season, Dobbie and Queens embarked on a club history-making Scottish Cup adventure. Dobbie scored a brace in the third round as Queens defeated Peterhead 5–0 at the Balmoor Stadium on 24 November 2007. Dobbie scored another goal in the fourth round 4–0 home win over Linlithgow Rose on 12 January 2008. Queens then defeated Greenock Morton 2–0 in the fifth round on 2 February 2008 at Cappielow.

Dobbie's opening goal in a 2–0 home win of the quarter-final match versus Dundee on 8 March 2008 at Palmerston helped Queens to their first Scottish Cup semi final since 1950. Queens second goal was scored by Ryan McCann with a notably long range shot from 84 yards. Queens then progressed to their first-ever Scottish Cup Final by defeating Aberdeen 4–3 in the semi-final on 12 April 2008. Dobbie started the semi-final at Hampden Park but had to be substituted as half-time approached due to an injury. Despite early second half goals by Steve Tosh and Jim Thomson, Queens were defeated 3–2 by Rangers in the final on 24 May 2008, with Dobbie being substituted in the 82nd minute. Dobbie was Queens' top goalscorer for the 2007–08 season, with 20 goals in a total of 44 games, as the club finished fourth in the First Division.

Dobbie played in Queens 2008–09 UEFA Cup campaign in August 2008, when they lost 4–2 over two legs to Danish Superliga club FC Nordsjælland in the second qualifying round. Despite being the most prolific goalscorer for the Dumfries club since Andy Thomson in the early 1990s, Chisholm elected to leave Dobbie out of the starting line-up for both matches, preferring Stewart Kean.

During the 2008–09 season, Dobbie scored 23 goals in 40 matches, including four in one match in a 7–1 home league win over Clyde on 25 April 2009, with all four goals arriving during a 13-minute spell during the second half, for his second Queens hat-trick. Dobbie won the First Division Player of the Month award for April 2009.

On 6 May 2009, Queens announced Dobbie was moving to Wales to play for Championship club Swansea City. Dobbie said of the move: "I'm sad to leave Queen of the South as I felt I'd struck up a good bond with the fans these past two and a half years. However, it's an offer I just couldn't refuse! I'd like to say a big thank-you to the manager, the players and coaching staff at Palmerston and I'll never forget my time there. If I'm not playing any week don't be surprised to see me in the stand watching Queens in action. Good luck to you all." Dobbie was the first player to transfer between the two clubs since Tommy Lang in 1938.

=== Swansea City ===
On 7 May 2009, Swansea City confirmed that they had agreed personal terms with Dobbie and that he would be moving to the South Wales club, subject to a medical at the Liberty Stadium. On 22 May 2009, Dobbie passed his medical and signed a three-year deal on a free transfer. On 11 August 2009, Dobbie's first two goals for the Swans arrived in a 3–0 win at home to Brighton & Hove Albion in the first round of the 2009–10 League Cup. On 25 August 2009, Dobbie's third goal arrived in the next round of the League Cup in a 2–1 defeat at home to Scunthorpe United. Dobbie had scored three goals in six matches for the Swans and he lost his first-team place due to picking up an injury and played only two more matches in 2009.

=== Blackpool (first loan spell) ===
On 1 February 2010, Dobbie signed on loan for Blackpool until the end of the 2009–10 season with a view to a permanent move after this loan spell.

On 3 February 2010, Dobbie scored his first goal for the Seasiders on his debut in a 3–2 defeat to West Bromwich Albion at Bloomfield Road. On 6 February 2010 in his first full appearance, Dobbie scored in the 89th minute in a 2–1 home defeat to Leicester City. Dobbie scored a crucial goal in the play-off semi-final versus Nottingham Forest and this earned the Tangerines a place in the Wembley final. Dobbie was a second-half substitute in the 3–2 play-off final win versus Cardiff City.

=== Return to Swansea City ===
After his loan spell with Blackpool, Dobbie returned to Swansea City. After Paulo Sousa departed the club to join Leicester City as their new manager, the new Swans manager Brendan Rodgers started playing Dobbie in the first team. With Craig Beattie and Gorka Pintado out injured long term, leaving only Shefki Kuqi to compete with Dobbie for the lone striker role, he was heavily relied on to score goals.

Dobbie scored in a 4–0 home win versus Preston North End on 14 August 2010, his first goal in a year for the Swans and he dedicated his strike to Besian Idrizaj. The following month, Dobbie scored in the 13th minute, to place the Swans 1–0 ahead versus Leeds United but Swansea ended up losing the game 2–1. After Shefki Kuqi was loaned out to Derby County, Dobbie was the only fit and available striker at the Liberty Stadium, whilst Rodgers looked elsewhere for a striker on loan. West Ham striker Frank Nouble arrived at Swansea on a three-month loan deal, as competition for Dobbie up front. Dobbie was dropped to the substitutes bench and was later used and scored to give the Swans a 2–0 lead. On 28 September 2010, his next goal arrived away at Watford that merited the Swans a 3–2 victory.

From October 2010 until January 2011, Dobbie was only used as a substitute and failed to score any goals as he was replaced by Middlesbrough loan signing Marvin Emnes and a returning Craig Beattie. Dobbie was getting fewer chances in the first team when Jermaine Easter joined for a month on loan from Milton Keynes Dons. On 28 December 2010, in a home match versus Barnsley, Dobbie was given a rare starting place, alongside Jermaine Easter. Easter scored the only goal of the match and Dobbie impressed in what seemed to be an attacking midfield role.

After Luke Moore was signed from West Bromwich Albion, Dobbie continued to be an unused substitute. On 22 February 2011, away to Coventry City, Dobbie appeared from the substitute's bench to score the only goal in a 1–0 victory. This was Dobbie's first goal in five months. On 8 March 2011, Dobbie opened the scoring with an early goal at home to Watford, as the match finished in a 1–1 draw. Dobbie scored three goals in the last two games of the season that helped the Swans finish third in the division.

During the first leg of the semi-final play-off match away to Nottingham Forest, left back Neil Taylor was sent off after only one minute of play. Rodgers substituted Dobbie immediately after the sending off that enabled the Swans to have another defender on the pitch. Dobbie scored the second goal in the home leg versus Nottm Forest that helped secure Swansea a place in the final with a 3–1 aggregate win.

Dobbie then played in the play-off final at Wembley, a second successive appearance in the final for Dobbie, as the Swans won 4–2 versus Reading. Dobbie scored the third goal and also set Scott Sinclair up for his goal. Swansea City were the first Welsh club to play in the Premier League since its formation in 1992.

After the Swans were promoted to the Premier League, Dobbie made his league debut for the club in a 4–0 defeat versus Manchester City. Dobbie had seven appearances in the Premier League without scoring a goal. Dobbie twisted his left ankle under a challenge from Kyle Naughton and suffered an injury. Dobbie's injury kept him out of action for a week until he returned to action versus Manchester United. After eight appearances in the Premier League, Dobbie found himself down the pecking order behind strikers Danny Graham, Leroy Lita, Luke Moore and new signing Rory Donnelly. Finding his first-team appearances limited, manager Brendan Rodgers allowed Dobbie to leave on loan after his former club Blackpool had enquired about his availability. Birmingham City also enquired on his availability, although lack of finances meant that the club could only get Dobbie on loan with a view to a permanent deal at the end of his loan spell. However, neither the Blues nor the Seasiders signed him on loan before the close of the transfer window on 31 January 2012. After failing to find a loan deal in the January transfer window, Rodgers understood Dobbie's frustration at his lack of first-team opportunities, although he did not allow Dobbie to leave the club on loan, as he could be required to play in the first team if other players were out injured.

=== Blackpool (second loan spell) ===
On 22 March 2012, it was confirmed that Dobbie had finally sealed a loan deal, returning to Blackpool until the end of that season. On 19 May 2012, Dobbie played in the 2012 Football League Championship play-off final at Wembley for the third successive season.

=== Brighton & Hove Albion ===
On 31 August 2012, Dobbie signed for Brighton & Hove Albion on a three-year contract for an undisclosed fee.

=== Crystal Palace ===
In January 2013, Dobbie joined Crystal Palace on an initial loan deal lasting until the end of the season. Dobbie completed a permanent transfer on 1 July 2013, signing a two-year contract. On 16 July 2014, he scored four goals in a 13–1 pre-season friendly win versus GAK Graz. On 22 May 2015, it was announced that Dobbie would not be offered a new contract by the Eagles at the end of the 2014-15 season.

=== Blackpool (third loan spell) ===
On 17 September 2013, Dobbie returned to Blackpool on a three-month loan deal. Dobbie had a substitute appearance for the Seasiders that night in an away fixture versus Millwall. Dobbie then had his first full appearance for the club versus Leicester City that ended time in a 2–1 defeat despite Dobbie scoring an 89th-minute goal. Three years later, Dobbie played 66 minutes in a 2–2 draw and was substituted in the second half for Ángel Martínez. Dobbie scored two goals in successive matches versus the Brighton and Wigan Athletic during April 2014 to help move the Seasiders above the relegation zone.

=== Fleetwood Town (loan spell) ===
On 7 August 2014, Dobbie joined League One club Fleetwood Town on loan until the end of that season, when he departed the Eagles.

=== Bolton Wanderers ===
On 5 August 2015, Dobbie joined Championship club Bolton Wanderers on a one-year deal and debuted from the bench on 11 August 2015 in a League Cup game versus Burton Albion, which Bolton lost 1–0.

Dobbie scored his first goal for the Trotters on 22 August 2015, when he scored just minutes after coming onto the pitch to snatch a late equaliser versus Nottingham Forest, with the game finishing 1–1. At the end of the 2015–16 season, the club confirmed that he would be leaving when his contract expired at the end of June 2016.

=== Queen of the South (second spell) ===
==== 2016–17 season ====
On 3 August 2016, Dobbie returned to Scotland and signed for Queen of the South once again. After initially signing up until the end of the 2016–17 season, Dobbie then extended his contract on 26 August 2016 up until May 2018. Dobbie was appointed the club's vice-captain on 7 January 2017 and scored 26 goals (19 league and 7 cup) in his first season back in Dumfries.

Dobbie was shortlisted for the PFA Scotland Championship player of the season, but lost out to Hibernian midfielder John McGinn. Dobbie was selected in the PFA Scotland Team of the Year for the Scottish Championship.

==== 2017–18 season ====
On 23 December 2017, Dobbie scored his 100th goal for Queens after only 18 seconds of the match in a 3–2 defeat versus St Mirren at Palmerston Park. Dobbie was only the fifth player in the club's history to reach this milestone, after Jim Patterson, Bobby Black, Derek Lyle and Andy Thomson. On 11 January 2018, Dobbie was presented with the Ladbrokes Scottish Championship Player of the Month award for December 2017.

On 13 January 2018, Dobbie signed an extension to his contract to keep him at Palmerston until May 2019. On 27 January 2018, Dobbie scored his third hat-trick of the season versus Brechin City in a 3–1 victory at Palmerston, having already scored trebles away to both Falkirk (4–1 win on 26 August 2017) and Dunfermline Athletic (5–2 win on 9 December 2017).

On 19 April 2018, Dobbie was nominated for the PFA Scotland's Scottish Championship player of the season, alongside Craig Halkett, Lewis Morgan and Cammy Smith. On 28 April 2018, Dobbie scored his fourth hat-trick of the campaign in the final league match of the 2017–18 season in a 5–1 away win over Brechin City at Glebe Park. Dobbie scored 27 goals (18 league and nine cup) in his second season back in Dumfries.

==== 2018–19 season ====
Dobbie was appointed Queens' new club captain after John Rankin departed to join Clyde during the 2018 close season. On 17 July 2018, Dobbie scored his fifth hat-trick since his return to Queen of the South against Clyde in a 3–0 win in the Scottish League Cup at Palmerston, his first treble of the season. Dobbie's sixth hat-trick since his return to Queen of the South and his second of the season was scored on 25 August 2018 in a 3–0 win away to Falkirk in the Scottish Championship.

On 1 September 2018, Dobbie scored his seventh hat-trick since his return to Palmerston in a 5–0 win at home to Ayr United in the Scottish Championship, his third treble of the season; the first three goals arrived in a ten-minute spell during the first half (12, 20 and 22 minutes), with his second goal being a penalty kick. Dobbie then had a penalty saved in the 31st minute by Ayr goalkeeper Ross Doohan. Dobbie scored his fourth goal of the match in the 84th minute. On 15 September 2018, he played in his 200th match for Queen of the South against Ross County in a goalless draw. At that point his record for Queens included 182 starts and 18 substitute appearances.

On 4 October 2018, Dobbie was presented with the Ladbrokes Scottish Championship Player of the Month award for September 2018. On 6 October 2018, Dobbie scored his eighth hat-trick since his return to Queens at home to Alloa Athletic in the Scottish Championship, his fourth treble of the season; the Wasps had taken a 3–0 lead in the first 25 minutes before Dobbie scored his goals on 36, 43 and 70 minutes. On 9 October 2018, Dobbie signed an extension to his contract to keep him at the Dumfries club until May 2020.

On 29 January 2019, Dobbie scored his ninth hat-trick since his return to Queen of the South, this time in a 3–0 win at home to Scottish Premiership club Dundee, in the fourth round replay of the 2018–19 Scottish Cup, his fifth treble of the season. Dobbie scored his goals after 12, 27 and 74 minutes, the first being a "looping long-range effort" from 25 yards. On 31 January, he was presented with the Scottish Championship Player of the Month award for January 2019. On 10 February, in the next round of the Scottish Cup, he scored an "outrageous" goal from around 30 yards to equalise against Aberdeen at Pittodrie, although this time the top-tier side responded and eventually won 4–1 to eliminate Queen of the South from the competition.

On 24 April 2019, Dobbie was nominated for the PFA Scotland's Championship player of the season, for the third consecutive year, alongside Billy Mckay, Lawrence Shankland and Pavol Šafranko and on 5 May 2019, Dobbie won the individual award and was selected in the Championship Team of the Year for the third successive season. He also won the equivalent individual award presented by the SPFL. Despite Dobbie's personal achievements, Queens finished ninth in the 2018–19 Scottish Championship and entered the play-offs along with Forfar Athletic, Raith Rovers and Montrose from League One.

On 11 May 2019, Dobbie scored his tenth hat-trick since his return to Queen of the South, this time in a 5–0 win at home to Montrose in the Scottish Championship play-off semi-final second leg, his sixth treble of the season. Dobbie scored his goals after 11, 28 and 40 minutes. Dobbie has scored the most goals for Queen of the South in all competitions in a single season in their entire history of 105 years. The previous record of 41 goals was held between Jimmy Rutherford in 1931–32 and Nicky Clark in 2012–13. Dobbie scored 43 goals (21 league and 22 cup) in his third season back in Dumfries.

==== 2019–20 season ====
On 27 July 2019, Dobbie was not in the squad for the final Scottish League Cup Group E match at Cappielow versus Greenock Morton, as he was injured early in the second half in the previous match away to Dumbarton. On 19 October 2019, after a wood carving statue of three club legends, Dobbie alongside Allan Ball and Billy Houliston was unveiled outside the Queens Arena to mark the club's centenary season, Dobbie scored a brace as Queen of the South defeated league leaders Dundee United 4–0 at Palmerston Park. On 21 December 2019, Dobbie extended his contract at Queens until 31 May 2021. Dobbie scored 11 goals (eight league and three cup) in his fourth season back in Dumfries.

==== 2020–21 season ====
On 4 December 2020, on the eve of his 38th birthday, Dobbie captained Queens to a 3–0 defeat at Palmerston versus Inverness Caledonian Thistle in the live Friday night match on BBC Scotland.

On 16 January 2021, Dobbie appeared as a used substitute in the 78th minute, replacing Joe McKee for the final 12 minutes versus Arbroath at Palmerston in a 2–2 draw. Dobbie had been out of action since 19 December 2020 with a hamstring injury whilst playing at Cappielow versus Greenock Morton.

On 28 April 2021, Dobbie announced that he would be leaving Queen of the South after the final league match of the 2020–21 season.

On 30 April 2021, Dobbie played 73 minutes versus Dundee in the 2–0 defeat at Palmerston in his final match for Queen of the South, before being replaced by Niyah Joseph.

Dobbie scored four goals (three league and one cup) in his fifth and final season at Queen of the South.

=== AFC Fylde ===
On 17 June 2021, Dobbie returned to England, signing for National League North side AFC Fylde. On 28 August, Dobbie scored his first goal the Coasters versus Hereford in the 76th minute in a 4–1 away win.

On 12 March 2022, having been out injured since November 2021, Dobbie's introduction for the final nine minutes of the Coasters 1–0 win away to Kidderminster Harriers was his 500th league appearance of his career. On 20 May, Dobbie was released by Fylde, and five days later he announced that he would be ending his 23-year playing career.

== Coaching career ==
In the 2021—22 season, in addition to his playing role for the first team, Dobbie was the manager for AFC Fylde's Under-18 team. During the season he won three trophies and was named as the North-West Youth Alliance Manager of the Season.

On 27 July 2022, Dobbie was appointed Senior Professional Development Phase coach at his former club Blackpool. Following the departure of Mick McCarthy on 8 April 2023 by mutual consent, it was announced that Dobbie would take charge of the first-team until the end of the season. Despite three wins in six games, he could not keep them in the division; Blackpool were relegated to League One after a home defeat to Millwall on 28 April 2023. The appointment of Neil Critchley in May 2023 saw Dobbie return to his previous role with the club's development squad.

On 3 September 2024, incoming head coach Steve Bruce named Dobbie and Richard Keogh as his first-team coaches. After Bruce's sacking, thirteen months later, Dobbie was installed as interim head coach, alongside Steve Banks.

== Personal life ==
Dobbie was born in Glasgow, growing up in Barlanark.

When Dobbie moved from Swansea to Blackpool in February 2010, his wife Susanne was nine months pregnant and already overdue. When Dobbie played in his debut for the Seasiders on 3 February 2010, his wife was five days overdue. Dobbie said: "My wife is in a hotel on the promenade. I've got a house organised which we are about to move into and everything has been a bit rushed. It was a case of a quick pack in Swansea, so the baby will be born in England now, instead of in Wales." A baby boy was born the following weekend.

After Dobbie returned to Queen of the South in 2016, his family remained living in Lytham St Annes, Lancashire, where they had settled while Dobbie played for Blackpool and Fleetwood Town. He then started commuting 133 miles (214 km) to Dumfries several times each week to train and play for Queen of the South.

== Career statistics ==
As of 23 May 2022

Appearances and goals by club, season and competition
Club	Season	League			National Cup		League Cup		Other		Total	
Club	Season	Division	Apps	Goals	Apps	Goals	Apps	Goals	Apps	Goals	Apps	Goals
Northern Spirit (loan)	2001–02	National Soccer League	3	0	—		—		—		3	0
Hibernian	2003–04	Scottish Premier League	28	2	1	0	4	4	—		33	6
Hibernian	2004–05	Scottish Premier League	7	0	0	0	3	1	2	0	12	1
Hibernian	Total		35	2	1	0	7	5	2	0	45	7
St Johnstone (loan)	2004–05	Scottish First Division	8	2	0	0	0	0	0	0	8	2
St Johnstone	2005–06	Scottish First Division	20	1	1	0	2	2	4	2	27	5
St Johnstone	2006–07	Scottish First Division	0	0	0	0	0	0	0	0	0	0
St Johnstone	Total		28	3	1	0	2	2	4	2	35	7
Dumbarton (loan)	2006–07	Scottish Third Division	17	10	0	0	1	1	0	0	18	11
Queen of the South	2006–07	Scottish First Division	15	8	4	3	1	0	1	1	21	12
Queen of the South	2007–08	Scottish First Division	36	16	6	4	1	0	1	0	44	20
Queen of the South	2008–09	Scottish First Division	33	23	1	0	1	0	5	0	40	23
Queen of the South	Total		84	47	11	7	3	0	7	1	105	55
Swansea City	2009–10	Championship	6	0	1	0	2	3	—		9	3
Swansea City	2010–11	Championship	41	9	1	0	3	0	3	2	48	11
Swansea City	2011–12	Premier League	8	0	0	0	1	0	—		9	0
Swansea City	2012–13	Premier League	0	0	0	0	1	0	—		1	0
Swansea City	Total		55	9	2	0	7	3	3	2	67	14
Blackpool (loan)	2009–10	Championship	16	4	0	0	0	0	3	1	19	5
Blackpool (loan)	2011–12	Championship	7	5	0	0	0	0	3	1	10	6
Blackpool (loan)	Total		23	9	0	0	0	0	6	2	29	11
Brighton & Hove Albion	2012–13	Championship	15	2	0	0	0	0	—		15	2
Crystal Palace (loan)	2012–13	Championship	15	3	0	0	0	0	—		15	3
Crystal Palace	2013–14	Premier League	1	0	0	0	1	0	—		2	0
Crystal Palace	2014–15	Premier League	0	0	0	0	0	0	0	0	0	0
Crystal Palace	Total		16	3	0	0	1	0	0	0	17	3
Blackpool (loan)	2013–14	Championship	15	2	0	0	0	0	—		15	2
Blackpool (loan)	2013–14	Championship	12	2	0	0	0	0	—		12	2
Blackpool (loan)	Total		27	4	0	0	0	0	0	0	27	4
Fleetwood Town (loan)	2014–15	League One	27	4	1	0	0	0	1	0	29	4
Bolton Wanderers	2015–16	Championship	24	4	0	0	1	0	—		25	4
Queen of the South	2016–17	Scottish Championship	35	19	1	0	2	1	3	6	41	26
Queen of the South	2017–18	Scottish Championship	31	18	3	1	4	4	4	4	42	27
Queen of the South	2018–19	Scottish Championship	30	21	4	7	5	8	6	7	45	43
Queen of the South	2019–20	Scottish Championship	25	8	1	0	3	2	1	1	30	11
Queen of the South	2020–21	Scottish Championship	17	3	1	0	2	1	0	0	20	4
Queen of the South	Total		138	69	10	8	16	16	14	18	178	111
Queen of the South combined total			222	116	21	15	19	16	21	19	283	166
AFC Fylde	2021–22	National League North	15	3	1	0	0	0	1	0	17	3
Career total			507	169	27	15	38	27	38	25	610	236

== Honours ==
Hibernian

- Scottish League Cup runner-up: 2003–04

Queen of the South

- Scottish Cup runner-up: 2007–08

Blackpool

- Football League Championship play-offs: 2010

Swansea City

- Football League Championship play-offs: 2011

Individual

- PFA Scotland Team of the Year: 2016–17 Scottish Championship, 2017–18 Scottish Championship, 2018–19 Scottish Championship
- Scottish Championship top scorer: 2016–17, 2017–18
