= Sean O'Connor (footballer) =

English footballer

Personal information
- Date of birth: 7 July 1981 (age 45)
- Place of birth: Wolverhampton, England
- Position: Striker

Senior career*
Years	Team	Apps	(Gls)
1999–2000	Hednesford Town	14	(1)
2000–2002	Dundee United	3	(1)
2001	→ Portadown (loan)	7	(2)
2001–2002	→ Greenock Morton (loan)	13	(5)
2002–2004	Queen of the South	55	(19)
2004–2006	Morecambe	16	(3)
2006–2009	Queen of the South	91	(14)
2010	Annan Athletic (trialist)	2	(1)
2010	Queen of the South (trialist)	2	(0)
2010–2011	Queen of the South	9	(0)
2011–2012	Annan Athletic	42	(15)
2012–	Hednesford Town	26	(8)
2013	→ Stafford Rangers (loan)		
- * Club domestic league appearances and goals as of 12:17, 2 March 2013 (UTC)

Sean O'Connor (born 7 July 1981) is an English former professional footballer, who played for Queen of the South, Hednesford Town, and Dundee United.

After starting his career with local side Hednesford Town, O'Connor moved into the Scottish game with Scottish Premier League side Dundee United. From there he had a couple of loan spells, one with Greenock Morton and the other with Northern Irish side Portadown. Upon leaving the Arabs he had a spell with Queen of the South before heading back to England with Morecambe.

Since leaving Morecambe in 2006, O'Connor has spent his time in the Scottish Football League, with Queen of the South again as well as their near neighbours Annan Athletic.

== Early career ==
O'Connor was born in Wolverhampton, West Midlands. He started his career at non-league club Hednesford Town, working his way through the youth system before making his first team debut during the 1998–99 season. His form attracted the attention of a number of clubs, with Dundee United paying £30,000 for him in January 2000, despite O'Connor only playing in 14 matches for Hednesford. His chances at United were limited to only a handful of appearances and he was sent out on loan to gain first team experience elsewhere. After a short spell in Northern Ireland playing for Portadown, he came back to Scotland to have a similar spell with Morton. Before these loan spells he scored his first and only goal for Dundee United in a 3–2 win over Dunfermline.

== Queen of the South (1st & 2nd spells) ==
In March 2002, O'Connor joined Queen of the South from Dundee United on a permanent contract. On 20 April 2002 he scored the third goal in the 3–0 victory that clinched the 2001–02 Scottish Second Division Championship at Station Park versus Forfar Athletic. He was an instant hit with the Queens faithful as he ended his first full season in Dumfries as top goalscorer. Injuries took their toll during his second full season at the club and O'Connor reluctantly rejected the offer of a new contract from Queens due to family reasons, at the end of 2003–04.

O'Connor returned to England at the start of the 2004–05 season and signed a two-year contract with Morecambe, where injuries again restricted his playing time. He scored three league goals in only 16 appearances for the club.

In 2006, O'Connor returned to Queen of the South, joining on a short-term deal, originally to prove his fitness. He played in all six of Queens' games in their run to the 2008 Scottish Cup Final, including the third goal in the 4–3 semi-final victory over Aberdeen at Hampden Park that took the club to their first-ever Scottish Cup Final in their 89-year history. Barry Nicholson of Aberdeen later said that he felt O'Connor was Queens best player on the day.

In the 2008 Scottish Cup Final, as Queens trailed Rangers 2–0 at half time through goals by Kris Boyd and DaMarcus Beasley, O'Connor crossed the ball for Steve Tosh to score Queen of the South's first goal of the match in 50 minutes. The Doonhamers equalised in 52 minutes through club captain Jim Thomson. Kris Boyd scored his 2nd goal of the final and Rangers 3rd in 71 minutes to secure the Scottish Cup for Rangers.

O'Connor scored in the home leg of Queen of the South's UEFA Cup 2nd qualification round match against FC Nordsjælland after 28 minutes. This made O'Connor the first player to score for Queens in a UEFA Cup Competition.

== Retirement and return to football ==
In April 2009 O'Connor announced he would retire the following month after a series of knee injuries, having initially been advised by medical staff to retire several months previously.

After retiring from the game at the end of the 2008–09 season, O'Connor decided to visit his surgeon and got the green light to relaunch his football career. After training with Queen of the South during February 2010, O'Connor returned as a trialist for Annan Athletic versus Elgin City on 6 March 2010. O'Connor played 81 minutes of the 3–3 draw at Galabank.

On 13 March 2010, O'Connor had a second match as a trialist for Annan Athletic versus Forfar Athletic and scored the opening goal in the 5–1 victory at Station Park. O'Connor played 63 minutes of this match.

O'Connor returned to the first team squad at Queen of the South on 18 March 2010. Manager at the time, Gordon Chisholm said, "The 'big man' actually hung up his boots at the end of last season but came out of retirement a month ago and has turned out twice as a trialist for Annan Athletic. Sean's been training with us for the past month and we all know what an asset he can be. He'll be in the squad for Saturday as a trialist but we'll be taking it one match at a time."

The first game of his return was at Somerset Park for Queens on 20 March 2010 versus Ayr United in a 3–0 defeat. O'Connor came on as a second-half substitute after 73 minutes and was immediately handed the captain's armband.

The second game of his return was at Dens Park for Queens on 23 March 2010 versus Dundee in a 1–1 draw. O'Connor came on as a second-half substitute after 67 minutes.

== Queen of the South (3rd spell) ==
O'Connor signed for Queen of the South until the end of season 2009–10 on 25 March 2010 after impressing the new Queens caretaker manager Kenny Brannigan.

He signed a one-year contract with the club on 7 May 2010. However the club announced on 13 January 2011 that O'Connor had left Queens again.

== Annan Athletic ==
O'Connor signed on a free transfer for the Galabank club on 13 January 2011, immediately after leaving Queens.

O'Connor was contracted to Annan Athletic for the 2011–12 season.

== Return to Hednesford Town ==
In the 2012–13 pre-season, O'Connor got in contact with his first club with the aim of training with the squad and getting back to fitness. O'Connor impressed enough during training to be given a number of appearances in Hednesford's pre-season friendlies, with him scoring twice against Heath Hayes and once against Sutton Coldfield Town.

On 6 August 2012, the club confirmed that they had received the international clearance required and O'Connor had signed a one-year contract for the Pitmen. O'Connor was loaned out to Stafford Rangers in March 2013 for four weeks.
