= John Stewart (footballer, born 1985) =

Scottish footballer

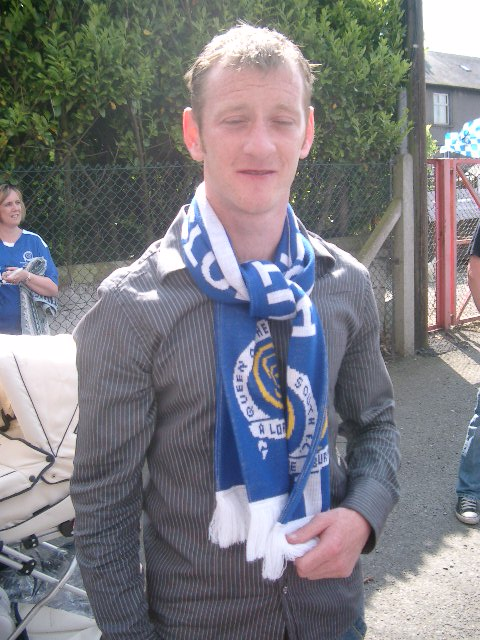
- John Stewart outside Palmerston Park, Dumfries

Personal information
- Full name: John Stewart
- Date of birth: 8 March 1985 (age 41)
- Place of birth: Bellshill, Scotland
- Position: Striker

Senior career*
| Years | Team | Apps | (Gls) |
| 2003–2006 | Aberdeen | 53 | (5) |
| 2006–2009 | Falkirk | 22 | (0) |
| 2007 | → St Johnstone (loan) | 8 | (1) |
| 2008 | → Queen of the South (loan) | 16 | (1) |
| 2009 | Ross County | 11 | (1) |
| 2009–2010 | Peterhead | 7 | (2) |
| 2010–2011 | Clyde | 46 | (12) |
| 2011–2012 | Bo'ness United | 19 | (8) |
| 2012–2013 | Livingston United | | |
- * Club domestic league appearances and goals as of 23:15, 10 November 2012 (UTC)

John Stewart (born 8 March 1985 in Bellshill) is a Scottish footballer who played for Livingston United. His previous clubs include Aberdeen, Falkirk and Clyde

== Playing career ==
Stewart began his career with Aberdeen. He was a regular in Aberdeen's reserve team; however, he found opportunities in the first team hard to come by. During his time with the club, he scored a late winning goal against Celtic in October 2004.

On 31 August 2006, he joined Falkirk for an undisclosed five-figure transfer fee. In July 2007, Stewart was banned from the club's pre-season trip to the Netherlands following a breach of discipline. On 18 July 2007 he was loaned to St Johnstone for six months.

Stewart joined Queen of the South in January 2008 on loan. After coming on as a substitute for the injured Stephen Dobbie, he scored the winning goal in a 4–3 Scottish Cup semi-final victory against Aberdeen, to take Queens to the final for the first time in their 89-year history. He also set up Paul Burns to put Queens 2-1 ahead in the same game. Stewart also scored in an earlier round against Morton and made a late substitute appearance in the final against Rangers.

He joined Ross County on the first day of the January transfer window in 2009. However his contract with County was terminated by the club on the last day of the Summer 2009 transfer window. His only goal for the club was Ross County's 1000th league goal since entering the Scottish Football League. Stewart appeared as a trialist for Peterhead in October 2009, and scored a goal against Clyde, which resulted in him signing a short-term contract with the club. He also scored the only goal in a re-arranged league encounter against Brechin City at Balmoor on 13 October 2009.

Stewart signed for Clyde on a free transfer in January 2010. He scored 12 goals in 49 appearances for Clyde, but he was not offered a new contract and left the club in May 2011. After a season with the Clyde, Stewart joined junior club Bo'ness United in the East Super League. He then joined Livingston United in October 2012.
