= Steve Tosh =

Scottish footballer

Personal information
- Full name: Steven William Tosh
- Date of birth: 27 April 1973 (age 53)
- Place of birth: Kirkcaldy, Scotland
- Position: Midfielder

Youth career
- Glenrothes

Senior career*
Years	Team	Apps	(Gls)
1993–1995	Arbroath	38	(12)
1995–1998	St Johnstone	44	(5)
1998–2000	Raith Rovers	69	(8)
2000–2002	Livingston	55	(3)
2002–2003	Falkirk	16	(1)
2003–2005	Aberdeen	55	(6)
2005–2007	Gretna	60	(20)
2007–2010	Queen of the South	73	(12)
2010	→ Livingston (loan)	15	(2)
2010–2011	Cove Rangers		
- Rosehearty Thistle Sportsmans Club
Total		425	(69)
- * Club domestic league appearances and goals

Steven William Tosh (born 27 April 1973) is a Scottish former professional footballer. A midfielder of many Scottish clubs, Tosh's last club was Cove Rangers.

== Playing career ==
Tosh, who was born in Kirkcaldy, played for Leven Royals then played for Savoy Thistle, Abbey Star, Leven Hibs then Glenrothes Strollers during his youth career. He started his senior career with Arbroath. Tosh signed for Perth side St Johnstone in 1995. Tosh scored 5 goals in 44 league appearances for the club.

Tosh signed for Raith Rovers (his hometown football club) in 1998. Tosh scored eight goals in 69 league appearances for the club. He moved to Livingston in 2000 and scored three goals in 55 league appearances for the club. Tosh signed for Falkirk in 2002 and scored one goal in 16 league appearances for the club.

Tosh signed for Aberdeen in 2003 and scored 6 goals in 55 league appearances for the club. Tosh was a popular figure at Pittodrie after Steve Paterson signed him. Tosh left Aberdeen in the January 2005 transfer window.

Tosh signed for Gretna midway through the 2004–05 season, helping them to win the Scottish Third Division Championship. Tosh was still at the club when they won a second successive league title in season 2005–06, when they won the Scottish Second Division Championship. Tosh was also at the club when they were runners-up in the 2006 Scottish Cup final to Hearts. Tosh scored 20 goals in 60 league appearances for the club. Tosh left Gretna in the January 2007 transfer window, before the demise of the football club at the end of the 2007–08 season.

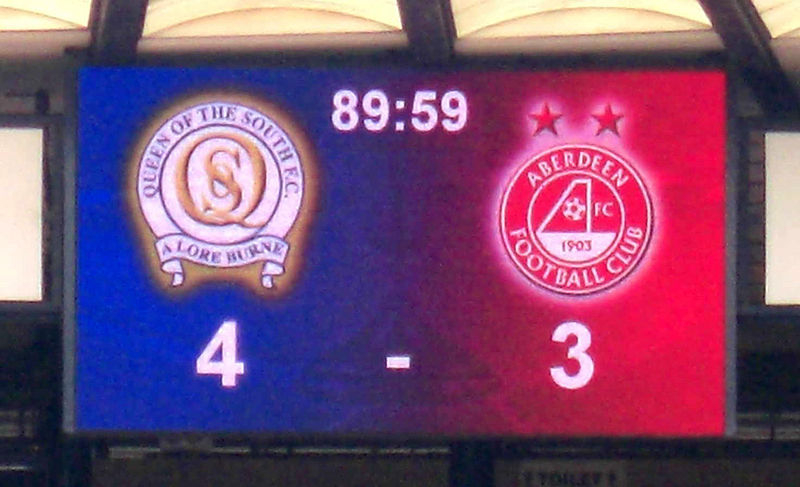
Semi final result on the scoreboard at Hampden Park

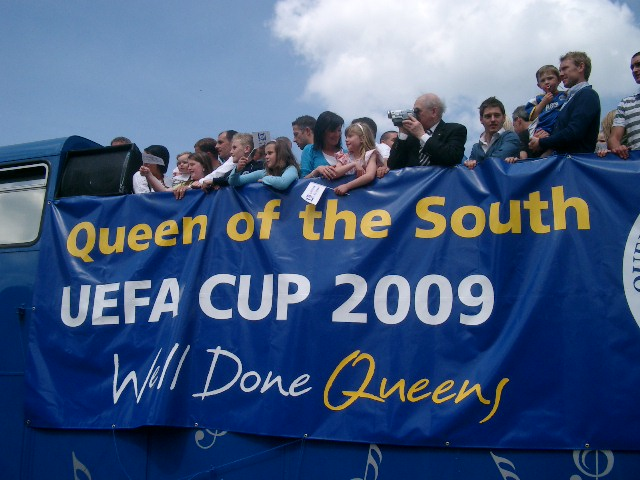
Open top bus for the QoS cup final squad. Tosh is on the right

Tosh signed for Dumfries club Queen of the South at the end of January 2007 on a deal until the end of the 2008–09 season. Set up by Andy Aitken, Tosh scored the opening goal for Queens in their 4–3 victory in the semi-final of the 2007–08 Scottish Cup against Aberdeen.

Steve Tosh scored the first Queen of the South goal in the 2007–08 Scottish Cup final against Rangers to bring the score back to 2–1. Jim Thomson made it 2–2 before Rangers eventually ran out 3–2 winners. Tosh commented in The Scotsman after the cup final with Queens, "We showed what we're capable of in the second half, and when I went into the Rangers dressing room they knew they had been in a game. But I'm still bitterly disappointed, even more devastated than I was with Gretna – I'm getting sick of picking up losers medals and I'd have much preferred us winning a crappy game 1–0." Tosh added, "I thought the free-kick that led to their first goal was very soft and that lots of decisions that were given against us were very easy to give. Sean O'Connor got pushed in the back in the box at the back post and it was as blatant as the nose on my face but that would have been a decision against Rangers in a cup final at the Rangers end and that's just not going to happen."

On 23 September 2009 Tosh played for Queens against Rangers in a League Cup home fixture at Palmerston Park. Midway through the second half Tosh suffered a broken left leg and ligament damage. Queens lost the game 2–1. Tosh underwent surgery two days after the match. It was with Queens that Tosh chalked up the largest league appearances tally of all the clubs he played for in his senior career – 73 league appearances including 12 goals in his three seasons at Palmerston Park.

On 29 January 2010, Queens announced that Tosh had moved to Livingston for the rest of the season in a loan deal, with Joe Hamill moving in the opposite direction. Tosh scored two goals in 15 league appearances for the Almondvale club during his loan spell.

Tosh signed a two-year contract with Cove Rangers, who play in the Highland Football League on 27 July 2010, after leaving Queen of the South at the end of the 2009–10 season. After Cove – Tosh played for Rosehearty Thistle.
