= 2001–02 Aberdeen F.C. season =

Aberdeen
2001–02 season
- Chairman: Stewart Milne
- Manager: Ebbe Skovdahl
- Stadium: Pittodrie Stadium
- SPL: 4th
- Scottish Cup: Quarter-finals
- League Cup: Third round
- Top goalscorer: League: Robbie Winters (13); All: Robbie Winters (14)
- Highest home attendance: 18,838 vs Rangers 28 July 2001
- Lowest home attendance: 8,599 vs Livingston 9 October 2001
- Average home league attendance: 13,970

== Players ==
=== Squad ===
Note: Flags indicate national team as defined under FIFA eligibility rules; some limited exceptions apply. Players may hold more than one non-FIFA nationality.

No.	Pos.	Nation	Player
1	GK	DEN	Peter Kjær
2	DF	SCO	Russell Anderson
3	DF	SCO	Derek Whyte (captain)
4	MF	NOR	Cato Guntveit
5	DF	NOR	Thomas Solberg
6	DF	SCO	Jamie McAllister
7	MF	BEL	Roberto Bisconti
8	MF	SCO	Darren Young (vice-captain)
9	FW	SCO	Robbie Winters
10	MF	SCO	Derek Young
11	FW	MAR	Hicham Zerouali
12	MF	ENG	Ben Thornley
13	GK	SCO	Mark Peat
14	DF	SCO	Phil McGuire

No.	Pos.	Nation	Player
15	DF	SCO	David Lilley
16	MF	MAR	Rachid Belabed
17	DF	SCO	Kevin McNaughton
18	MF	SCO	Chris Clark
19	FW	CIV	Eugène Dadi
20	DF	SCO	Kevin Rutkiewicz
21	FW	ENG	Leon Mike
22	FW	SCO	Darren Mackie
23	GK	SCO	Ryan Esson
24	MF	SCO	Ross O'Donoghue
25	MF	SCO	Fergus Tiernan
27	DF	ISL	Calum Bett
28	FW	SCO	Scott Michie
30	GK	ENG	David Preece

== Statistics ==
=== Top scorers ===
No.	Player	SPL	SC	LC	Total
1.	(Scotland) Robbie Winters	13	1	0	14
2.	(Scotland) Darren Mackie	8	0	1	9
3.	(Morocco) Hicham Zerouali	8	0	0	8
4.	(Ivory Coast) Eugène Dadi	4	0	1	5
=5.	(Scotland) Derek Young	3	1	0	4
=5.	(England) Ben Thornley	3	1	0	4

=== Captains ===
No.	Player	No. games
1.	(Scotland) Derek Whyte	30

== Results and fixtures ==
=== Scottish Premier League ===
Round	Date	Opponent	H/A	Score	Aberdeen Scorer(s)	Attendance	Report
1	28 July	Rangers	H	0–3		18,838	BBC Sport
2	4 August	Heart of Midlothian	A	0–1		12,696	BBC Sport
3	11 August	Hibernian	A	0–2		13,150	AFC Heritage
4	18 August	Motherwell	H	4–2	Thornley, Winters, Mackie, Zerouali	10,988	AFC Heritage
5	25 August	St Johnstone	A	1–1	McGuire	5,459	AFC Heritage
6	8 September	Kilmarnock	H	2–0	Thornley (2)	10,735	AFC Heritage
7	15 September	Dundee United	H	2–1	Winters, Zerouali	12,948	AFC Heritage
8	22 September	Celtic	A	0–2		59,197	AFC Heritage
9	29 September	Dundee	A	4–1	Zerouali (3), Mackie	8,359	AFC Heritage
10	13 October	Livingston	A	2–2	Mackie (2)	6,393	AFC Heritage
11	20 October	Dunfermline Athletic	H	3–2	Winters (2), Solberg	11,195	AFC Heritage
12	27 October	Heart of Midlothian	H	3–2	Dadi, Winters, Derek Young	13,883	AFC Heritage
13	4 November	Rangers	A	0–2		49,379	AFC Heritage
14	10 November	Motherwell	H	1–0	Dadi	11,490	AFC Heritage
15	17 November	Hibernian	H	2–0	Winters, Zerouali	12,511	AFC Heritage
16	24 November	Motherwell	A	2–3	Winters, Zerouali	7,032	AFC Heritage
17	1 December	St Johnstone	H	1–0	Winters	17,369	AFC Heritage
18	8 December	Kilmarnock	A	1–3	Zerouali	7,611	AFC Heritage
19	15 December	Dundee United	A	1–1	Winters	9,129	AFC Heritage
20	22 December	Celtic	H	2–0	Winters, Mackie	18,610	AFC Heritage
21	29 December	Dunfermline Athletic	A	0–1		7,774	AFC Heritage
22	2 January	Livingston	H	0–3		15,709	AFC Heritage
23	12 January	Heart of Midlothian	A	1–3	Bisconti	12,902	AFC Heritage
24	19 January	Rangers	H	0–1		17,846	AFC Heritage
25	23 January	Hibernian	A	4–3	Dadi, Winters, Guntveit, Mackie	10,555	AFC Heritage
26	29 January	Dundee	H	0–0		11,027	AFC Heritage
27	2 February	St Johnstone	A	1–0	Dadi	4,305	AFC Heritage
28	9 February	Kilmarnock	H	1–0	McGuire	13,004	AFC Heritage
29	16 February	Dundee United	H	4–0	Derek Young (2), Winters, Mike	13,612	AFC Heritage
30	2 March	Celtic	A	0–1		59,564	AFC Heritage
31	9 March	Dundee	A	3–2	Darren Young, Anderson, Mackie	8,122	AFC Heritage
32	16 March	Dunfermline Athletic	H	1–0	Mike	13,764	AFC Heritage
33	23 March	Livingston	A	0–0		9,449	AFC Heritage
34	6 April	Dunfermline Athletic	A	0–0		7,339	AFC Heritage
35	13 April	Heart of Midlothian	H	2–3	Rutkiewicz, Winters	12,467	AFC Heritage
36	20 April	Livingston	H	3–0	Mike, McGuire, Mackie	14,109	AFC Heritage
37	27 April	Rangers	A	0–2		48,878	AFC Heritage
38	12 May	Celtic	H	0–1	[Shaun Maloney	15,332	AFC Heritage

==== Final standings ====
Pos	Team	Pld	W	D	L	GF	GA	GD	Pts	Qualification or relegation (Note: Teams played each other three times (33 matches), before the league split into two groups (the top six and the bottom six) for the last five matches.)
2	Rangers	38	25	10	3	82	27	+55	85	Qualification for the UEFA Cup first round
3	Livingston	38	16	10	12	50	47	+3	58	Qualification for the UEFA Cup qualifying round (Note: As both finalists of the 2001–02 Scottish Cup, Rangers and Celtic, qualified for European competition via their league position, the cup berth for 2002–03 UEFA Cup was passed to the next-placed team in the league, fourth-placed Aberdeen.)
4	Aberdeen	38	16	7	15	51	49	+2	55	Qualification for the UEFA Cup qualifying round
5	Heart of Midlothian	38	14	6	18	52	57	−5	48	
6	Dunfermline Athletic	38	12	9	17	41	64	−23	45	

Source: Scottish Professional Football League
Rules for classification: (1) Points; (2) Goal difference; (3) Goals scored

=== Scottish League Cup ===
Round	Date	Opponent	H/A	Score	Aberdeen Scorer(s)	Attendance	Report
R2	25 September	Queen of the South	A	2–1	Dadi, Thornley	3,418	AFC Heritage
R3	9 October	Livingston	H	1–6	Mackie	8,599	AFC Heritage

=== Scottish Cup ===
Round	Date	Opponent	H/A	Score	Aberdeen Scorer(s)	Attendance	Report
R3	8 January	St Johnstone	A	2–0	Darren Young, Thornley	4,070	AFC Heritage
R4	26 January	Livingston	H	2–0	Winters, McAllister	10,261	AFC Heritage
QF	25 February	Celtic	H	0–2		17,082	AFC Heritage

== Squad ==
=== Appearances & Goals ===
No.	Pos	Nat	Player	Total		SPL		Scottish Cup		League Cup	
No.	Pos	Nat	Player	Apps	Goals	Apps	Goals	Apps	Goals	Apps	Goals
1	GK	(Denmark) DEN	Peter Kjær	25	0	23	0	2	0	0	0
2	DF	(Scotland) SCO	Russell Anderson	25	1	24	1	1	0	0	0
3	DF	(Scotland) SCO	Derek Whyte (c)	36	0	31	0	3	0	2	0
4	MF	(Norway) NOR	Cato Guntveit	21	1	19	1	2	0	0	0
5	DF	(Norway) NOR	Thomas Solberg	17	1	15	1	0	0	2	0
6	DF	(Scotland) SCO	Jamie McAllister	33	1	29	0	3	1	1	0
7	MF	(Belgium) BEL	Roberto Bisconti	35	1	31	1	3	0	1	0
8	MF	(Scotland) SCO	Darren Young	37	1	32	1	3	0	2	0
9	FW	(Scotland) SCO	Robbie Winters	38	14	34	13	3	1	1	0
10	MF	(Scotland) SCO	Derek Young	36	4	32	3	3	1	1	0
11	MF	(Morocco) MAR	Hicham Zerouali	21	8	18	8	1	0	2	0
12	MF	(England) ENG	Ben Thornley	28	5	24	3	2	1	2	1
13	GK	(Scotland) SCO	Mark Peat	1	0	1	0	0	0	0	0
14	DF	(Scotland) SCO	Phil McGuire	43	3	38	3	3	0	2	0
15	DF	(Scotland) SCO	David Lilley	0	0	0	0	0	0	0	0
16	MF	(Belgium) BEL	Rachid Belabed	1	0	1	0	0	0	0	0
17	DF	(Scotland) SCO	Kevin McNaughton	39	0	34	0	3	0	2	0
18	MF	(Scotland) SCO	Chris Clark	9	0	8	0	0	0	1	0
19	FW	(Ivory Coast) CIV	Eugène Dadi	33	5	28	4	3	0	2	1
20	DF	(Scotland) SCO	Kevin Rutkiewicz	4	1	4	1	0	0	0	0
21	FW	(England) ENG	Leon Mike	9	3	9	3	0	0	0	0
22	FW	(Scotland) SCO	Darren Mackie	38	9	34	8	2	0	2	1
23	GK	(Scotland) SCO	Ryan Esson	12	0	9	0	1	0	2	0
24	MF	(Scotland) SCO	Ross O'Donoghue	1	0	1	0	0	0	0	0
25	MF	(Scotland) SCO	Fergus Tiernan	25	0	23	0	0	0	2	0
27	MF	(Iceland) ISL	Calum Bett	3	0	3	0	0	0	0	0
28	FW	(Scotland) SCO	Scott Michie	0	0	0	0	0	0	0	0
30	GK	(England) ENG	David Preece	8	0	8	0	0	0	0	0

== Notes and references ==
- Scottish Football League. Bell's Scottish Football League Review 2001/02. PPL Sport & Leisure 2001. ISBN 1-903381-10-X.
- Scottish Football League. Bell's Scottish Football League Review 2002/03. PPL Sport & Leisure 2002. ISBN 1-903381-13-4.
- AFC Heritage Trust
