= 2002–03 Aberdeen F.C. season =

Aberdeen
2002–03 season
- Chairman: Stewart Milne
- Manager: Ebbe Skovdahl (to December); Gardner Speirs (interim); Steve Paterson (from December)
- Stadium: Pittodrie Stadium
- Scottish Premier League: 8th
- Scottish Cup: Fourth round
- Scottish League Cup: Quarter-final
- UEFA Cup: First round
- Top goalscorer: League: Paul Sheerin (8); All: Paul Sheerin (8)
- Highest home attendance: 17,284 vs Celtic 10 August 2002
- Lowest home attendance: 6,068 vs Queen of the South 18 February 2003
- Average home league attendance: 11,744

The 2002–03 season was Aberdeen's 90th season in the top flight of Scottish football. Aberdeen competed in the Scottish Premier League, Scottish League Cup, Scottish Cup and UEFA Cup.

== Scottish Premier League ==
Round	Date	Opponent	H/A	Score	Aberdeen Scorer(s)	Attendance	Report
1	3 August	Hibernian	A	2–1	Mackie, Clark	13,340	AFC Heritage
2	10 August	Celtic	H	0–4		17,284	AFC Heritage
3	18 August	Heart of Midlothian	H	1–1	D'Jaffo	12,825	AFC Heritage
4	25 August	Rangers	A	0–2		42,219	AFC Heritage
5	1 September	Partick Thistle	H	0–1		12,591	AFC Heritage
6	11 September	Dundee United	H	1–2	Mackie	10,724	AFC Heritage
7	14 September	Kilmarnock	A	2–2	D'Jaffo, Darren Young	6,538	AFC Heritage
8	22 September	Livingston	A	2–1	Anderson, McNaughton	7,513	AFC Heritage
9	28 September	Dunfermline Athletic	H	3–1	Billio, D'Jaffo, Derek Young	11,678	AFC Heritage
10	5 October	Motherwell	A	2–1	Derek Young, Deloumeaux	6,104	AFC Heritage
11	19 October	Dundee	H	0–0		14,003	AFC Heritage
12	27 October	Hibernian	H	0–1		12,321	AFC Heritage
13	3 November	Celtic	A	0–7		58,526	AFC Heritage
14	9 November	Heart of Midlothian	A	0–0		11,920	AFC Heritage
15	16 November	Rangers	H	2–2	Mike, Mackie	14,915	AFC Heritage
16	23 November	Partick Thistle	A	1–2	Mike	6,182	AFC Heritage
17	30 November	Dundee United	A	1–1	McGuire	8,261	AFC Heritage
18	3 December	Kilmarnock	H	0–1		8,816	AFC Heritage
19	7 December	Motherwell	H	1–1	Derek Young	9,569	AFC Heritage
20	15 December	Dunfermline Athletic	A	0–3		4,835	AFC Heritage
21	21 December	Livingston	H	0–0		11,253	AFC Heritage
22	26 December	Dundee	A	2–1	McGuire, Smith	8,574	AFC Heritage
23	29 December	Hibernian	A	0–2		11,604	AFC Heritage
24	2 January	Celtic	H	1–1	Anderson	16,331	AFC Heritage
25	28 January	Heart of Midlothian	H	0–1		9,322	AFC Heritage
26	1 February	Rangers	A	1–2	Tosh	49,667	AFC Heritage
27	8 February	Partick Thistle	H	0–1		11,334	AFC Heritage
28	16 February	Dundee United	H	3–0	Sheerin (2), McGuire	9,146	AFC Heritage
29	1 March	Kilmarnock	A	0–2		5,769	AFC Heritage
30	8 March	Motherwell	A	1–0	Sheerin	5,636	AFC Heritage
31	15 March	Dundee	H	3–3	Sheerin (2), McGuire	12,119	AFC Heritage
32	5 April	Livingston	A	2–1	Derek Young, Sheerin	5,731	AFC Heritage
33	12 April	Dunfermline Athletic	H	1–0	Sheerin	10,030	AFC Heritage
34	26 April	Livingston	H	1–0	Hinds	8,912	AFC Heritage
35	3 May	Hibernian	A	1–3	Tiernan	7,904	AFC Heritage
36	10 May	Partick Thistle	H	2–1	Hinds, McGuire	9,960	AFC Heritage
37	17 May	Motherwell	A	3–2	Hinds, Deloumeaux, Sheerin	4,731	AFC Heritage
38	24 May	Dundee United	A	2–0	Mackie, Tosh	8,516	AFC Heritage

=== Final standings ===
Pos	Team	Pld	W	D	L	GF	GA	GD	Pts	Qualification or relegation (Note: Teams played each other three times (33 matches), before the league split into two groups (the top six and the bottom six) for the last five matches.)
6	Dundee	38	10	14	14	50	60	−10	44	Qualification for the UEFA Cup first round (Note: As Rangers, the 2002–03 Scottish Cup winners, qualified for the UEFA Champions League via their league position, the place in the UEFA Cup was passed onto Dundee, the cup runners-up)
7	Hibernian	38	15	6	17	56	64	−8	51	
8	Aberdeen	38	13	10	15	41	54	−13	49	
9	Livingston	38	9	8	21	48	62	−14	35	
10	Partick Thistle	38	8	11	19	37	58	−21	35	

Source: Scottish Professional Football League
Rules for classification: 1) Points; 2) Goal difference; 3) Goals scored

== Scottish League Cup ==
Round	Date	Opponent	H/A	Score	Aberdeen Scorer(s)	Attendance	Report
R3	6 November	Motherwell	H	3–1	Mike, Deloumeaux, Michie	6,557	AFC Heritage
QF	12 November	Heart of Midlothian	H	0–1		7,576	AFC Heritage

== Scottish Cup ==
Round	Date	Opponent	H/A	Score	Aberdeen Scorer(s)	Attendance	Report
R3	25 January	Queen of the South	A	0–0		5,716	AFC Heritage
R3R	18 February	Queen of the South	H	4–1	D'Jaffo (2), Derek Young, Anderson	6,068	AFC Heritage
R4	22 February	Dundee	A	0–2		7,549	AFC Heritage

== UEFA Cup ==
Round	Date	Opponent	H/A	Score	Aberdeen Scorer(s)	Attendance	Report
PR2 L1	15 August	(Moldova) Nistru Otaci	H	1–0	Mackie	9,894	AFC Heritage
PR2 L2	29 August	(Moldova) Nistru Otaci	A	0–0		4,000	AFC Heritage
R1 L1	17 September	(Germany) Hertha Berlin	H	0–0		10,180	AFC Heritage
R1 L2	1 October	(Germany) Hertha Berlin	A	0–1		30,770	AFC Heritage

== Squad ==
Note: Flags indicate national team as defined under FIFA eligibility rules; some limited exceptions apply. Players may hold more than one non-FIFA nationality.

No.	Pos.	Nation	Player
1	GK	DEN	Peter Kjær
2	DF	SCO	Kevin McNaughton
3	DF	SCO	Jamie McAllister
4	MF	SCO	Fergus Tiernan
5	DF	SCO	Russell Anderson (Captain)
6	DF	SCO	Phil McGuire
7	MF	BEL	Roberto Bisconti
8	MF	SCO	Darren Young (Vice-Captain)
9	FW	ENG	Leon Mike
10	MF	SCO	Derek Young
11	FW	SCO	Darren Mackie
12	MF	ENG	Ben Thornley
12	MF	SCO	Steve Tosh
13	GK	SCO	Mark Peat

No.	Pos.	Nation	Player
14	MF	SCO	Chris Clark
15	DF	SCO	Kevin Rutkiewicz
16	MF	IRL	Ross O'Donoghue
18	DF	FRA	Eric Deloumeaux
19	FW	BEN	Laurent D'Jaffo
20	MF	FRA	Nicolas Fabiano
22	FW	SCO	Scott Michie
23	GK	SCO	Ryan Esson
24	DF	SCO	Stephen Payne
25	MF	ITA	Patrizio Billio
26	MF	SCO	Paul Sheerin
27	DF	SCO	Michael Hart
28	FW	ENG	Leigh Hinds

=== Appearances & Goals ===
No.	Pos	Nat	Player	Total		SPL		Scottish Cup		League Cup		UEFA Cup	
No.	Pos	Nat	Player	Apps	Goals	Apps	Goals	Apps	Goals	Apps	Goals	Apps	Goals
1	GK	(Denmark) DEN	Peter Kjær	29	0	23	0	0	0	2	0	4	0
2	DF	(Scotland) SCO	Kevin McNaughton	26	1	22	1	1	0	0	0	3	0
3	DF	(Scotland) SCO	Jamie McAllister	38	0	29	0	3	0	2	0	4	0
4	MF	(Scotland) SCO	Fergus Tiernan	24	1	21	1	0	0	2	0	1	0
5	DF	(Scotland) SCO	Russell Anderson (c)	42	3	33	2	3	1	2	0	4	0
6	DF	(Scotland) SCO	Phil McGuire	45	5	36	5	3	0	2	0	4	0
7	MF	(Belgium) BEL	Roberto Bisconti	17	0	11	0	0	0	2	0	4	0
8	MF	(Scotland) SCO	Darren Young	30	1	24	1	0	0	2	0	4	0
9	FW	(England) ENG	Leon Mike	30	3	24	2	1	0	2	1	3	0
10	MF	(Scotland) SCO	Derek Young	38	5	29	4	3	1	2	0	4	0
11	FW	(Scotland) SCO	Darren Mackie	36	5	30	4	1	0	1	0	4	1
12	MF	(England) ENG	Ben Thornley	7	0	6	0	0	0	1	0	0	0
12	MF	(Scotland) SCO	Steve Tosh	17	2	14	2	3	0	0	0	0	0
13	GK	(Scotland) SCO	Mark Peat	0	0	0	0	0	0	0	0	0	0
14	MF	(Scotland) SCO	Chris Clark	30	1	25	1	3	0	0	0	2	0
15	DF	(Scotland) SCO	Kevin Rutkiewicz	25	0	20	0	2	0	2	0	1	0
16	MF	(Scotland) SCO	Ross O'Donoghue	8	0	5	0	3	0	0	0	0	0
18	DF	(France) FRA	Éric Deloumeaux	40	3	32	2	2	0	2	1	4	0
19	FW	(France) FRA	Laurent D'Jaffo	25	5	18	3	3	2	0	0	4	0
20	MF	(France) FRA	Nicolas Fabiano	17	0	12	0	2	0	1	0	2	0
22	FW	(Scotland) SCO	Scott Michie	24	1	21	0	0	0	2	1	1	0
23	GK	(Scotland) SCO	Ryan Esson	0	0	0	0	0	0	0	0	0	0
24	DF	(Scotland) SCO	Stephen Payne	10	0	8	0	2	0	0	0	0	0
25	MF	(Italy) ITA	Patrizio Billio	12	1	10	1	0	0	1	0	1	0
26	MF	(Scotland) SCO	Paul Sheerin	17	8	14	8	3	0	0	0	0	0
27	DF	(Scotland) SCO	Michael Hart	9	0	8	0	1	0	0	0	0	0
28	FW	(England) ENG	Leigh Hinds	12	3	12	3	0	0	0	0	0	0
30	GK	(England) ENG	David Preece	19	0	16	0	3	0	0	0	0	0
	DF	(Scotland) SCO	Richard Foster	2	0	2	0	0	0	0	0	0	0
	DF	(Scotland) SCO	Scott Morrison	2	0	2	0	0	0	0	0	0	0
	MF	(Scotland) SCO	Scott Muirhead	2	0	2	0	0	0	0	0	0	0
	DF	(Scotland) SCO	Zander Diamond	1	0	1	0	0	0	0	0	0	0
	DF	(Scotland) SCO	Craig Higgins	0	0	0	0	0	0	0	0	0	0
	DF	(Scotland) SCO	Kevin Souter	1	0	1	0	0	0	0	0	0	0
