= 2003–04 Aberdeen F.C. season =

Aberdeen
2003–04 season
- Chairman: Stewart Milne
- Manager: Steve Paterson
- Stadium: Pittodrie Stadium
- Scottish Premier League: 11th
- Scottish Cup: Quarter-final
- Scottish League Cup: Quarter-final
- Top goalscorer: League: Paul Sheerin (8); All: Paul Sheerin (8)
- Highest home attendance: 16,452 vs Celtic 24 January 2004
- Lowest home attendance: 3,631 vs Brechin City 28 October 2003
- Average home league attendance: 9,884

The 2003–04 season was Aberdeen's 91st season in the top flight of Scottish football. Aberdeen competed in the Scottish Premier League, Scottish League Cup, Scottish Cup.

== Squad ==
Note: Flags indicate national team as defined under FIFA eligibility rules; some limited exceptions apply. Players may hold more than one non-FIFA nationality.

No.	Pos.	Nation	Player
1	GK	ENG	David Preece
2	DF	SCO	Michael Hart
5	DF	SCO	Russell Anderson
6	DF	SCO	Phil McGuire
7	FW	ENG	Leigh Hinds
8	MF	SCO	Steve Tosh
9	FW	SCO	Scott Booth
10	MF	SCO	Paul Sheerin
11	FW	SCO	Darren Mackie
14	MF	SCO	Chris Clark
15	DF	SCO	Kevin Rutkiewicz
16	MF	SCO	Fergus Tiernan
17	DF	SCO	Kevin McNaughton
18	DF	SCO	Richard Foster

No.	Pos.	Nation	Player
19	FW	AUS	David Zdrilic
21	FW	SCO	Bryan Prunty
22	DF	SCO	Scott Muirhead
23	GK	SCO	Ryan Esson
24	MF	SCO	Scott Morrison
25	DF	SCO	Duncan Jones
26	MF	SCO	Kevin Souter
27	DF	SCO	Zander Diamond
28	FW	SCO	Stephen Tarditi
29	MF	FIN	Markus Heikkinen
30	DF	SCO	Murray McCulloch
32	FW	SCO	John Stewart
36	DF	SCO	Andrew Considine

== Results ==
=== Scottish Premier League ===
Pos	Team	Pld	W	D	L	GF	GA	GD	Pts	Qualification or relegation (Note: Teams played each other three times (33 matches), before the league split into two groups (the top six and the bottom six) for the last five matches.)
8	Hibernian	38	11	11	16	41	60	−19	44	Qualification for the UEFA Intertoto Cup second round (Note: Hibernian qualified for the 2004 UEFA Intertoto Cup as the highest placed team to apply to participate in the competition.)
9	Livingston	38	10	13	15	48	57	−9	43	
10	Kilmarnock	38	12	6	20	51	74	−23	42	
11	Aberdeen	38	9	7	22	39	63	−24	34	
12	Partick Thistle (R)	38	6	8	24	39	67	−28	26	Relegation to the Scottish First Division

Source: Scottish Professional Football League
Rules for classification: 1) Points; 2) Goal difference; 3) Goals scored
(R) Relegated
Notes:

Round	Date	Opponent	H/A	Score	Aberdeen Scorer(s)	Attendance	Report
1	9 August	Heart of Midlothian	A	0–2		14,260	AFC Heritage
2	16 August	Rangers	H	2–3	Zdrilic, Deloumeaux	16,348	AFC Heritage
3	23 August	Dunfermline Athletic	H	1–2	Zdrilic	10,870	AFC Heritage
4	30 August	Hibernian	A	1–1	Anderson	10,682	AFC Heritage
5	13 September	Partick Thistle	H	2–1	Booth, Anderson	10,597	AFC Heritage
6	20 September	Dundee	A	0–2		7,887	AFC Heritage
7	27 September	Livingston	H	0–3		10,307	AFC Heritage
8	4 October	Kilmarnock	A	3–1	Zdrilic, Tosh, Booth	6,023	AFC Heritage
9	18 October	Dundee United	H	0–1		11,234	AFC Heritage
10	25 October	Celtic	A	0–4		59,598	AFC Heritage
11	1 November	Motherwell	H	0–3		9,895	AFC Heritage
12	9 November	Heart of Midlothian	H	0–1		9,687	AFC Heritage
13	22 November	Rangers	A	0–3		49,962	AFC Heritage
14	29 November	Dunfermline Athletic	A	2–2	Deloumeaux, Booth	5,294	AFC Heritage
15	7 December	Hibernian	A	3–1	Booth (2), Hinds	7,863	AFC Heritage
16	13 December	Partick Thistle	A	3–0	Anderson (2), Clark	5,189	AFC Heritage
17	20 December	Dundee	H	2–2	Anderson, Wilkie	8,261	AFC Heritage
18	27 December	Livingston	A	1–1	Booth	7,115	AFC Heritage
19	3 January	Kilmarnock	H	3–1	Diamond, Tosh, Hinds	11,698	AFC Heritage
20	17 January	Dundee United	A	2–3	Booth, Clark	8,888	AFC Heritage
21	24 January	Celtic	H	1–3	Tosh	16,452	AFC Heritage
22	11 February	Heart of Midlothian	A	0–2		11,236	AFC Heritage
23	14 February	Rangers	H	1–1	Diamond	15,185	AFC Heritage
24	21 February	Dunfermline Athletic	H	2–0	McGuire, Booth	12,035	AFC Heritage
25	24 February	Motherwell	A	0–1		5,225	AFC Heritage
26	28 February	Hibernian	A	1–0	Morrison	10,416	AFC Heritage
27	9 March	Partick Thistle	H	0–0		7,395	AFC Heritage
28	13 March	Dundee	A	1–1	Hinds	6,839	AFC Heritage
29	21 March	Livingston	H	1–2	Hinds	7,477	AFC Heritage
30	27 March	Kilmarnock	A	1–3	Prunty	7,250	AFC Heritage
31	3 April	Dundee United	H	3–0	Hinds, McGuire, Sheerin	8,449	AFC Heritage
32	18 April	Motherwell	H	0–2		7,246	AFC Heritage
33	21 April	Celtic	A	2–1	Prunty, Zdrilic	51,000	AFC Heritage
34	24 April	Livingston	A	0–2		3,133	AFC Heritage
35	1 May	Partick Thistle	A	0–2		2,829	AFC Heritage
36	8 May	Hibernian	H	0–1		6,781	AFC Heritage
37	12 May	Kilmarnock	A	0–4		4,987	AFC Heritage
38	15 May	Dundee	H	1–2	Foster	7,878	AFC Heritage

=== Scottish League Cup ===
Round	Date	Opponent	H/A	Score	Aberdeen Scorer(s)	Attendance	Report
R2	23 September	Dumbarton	H	3–1	Zdrilic (2), Hinds	3,944	AFC Heritage
R3	28 October	Brechin City	H	5–0	Tosh, Booth, Muirhead, Sheerin, Hinds	3,631	AFC Heritage
QF	2 December	Livingston	H	2–3 (aet)	Tosh (2)	6,090	AFC Heritage

=== Scottish Cup ===
Round	Date	Opponent	H/A	Score	Aberdeen Scorer(s)	Attendance	Report
R3	10 January	Dundee	H	0–0		11,012	AFC Heritage
R3R	21 January	Dundee	A	3–2	Clark, Heikkinen, Zdrilic	5,857	AFC Heritage
R4	7 February	Falkirk	A	2–0	Zdrilic, Booth	4,747	AFC Heritage
QF	6 March	Livingston	H	1–1	Muirhead	11,593	AFC Heritage
QFR	18 March	Livingston	A	0–1		4,485	AFC Heritage

== Squad ==
=== Appearances & Goals ===
No.	Pos	Nat	Player	Total		SPL		Scottish Cup		League Cup	
No.	Pos	Nat	Player	Apps	Goals	Apps	Goals	Apps	Goals	Apps	Goals
1	GK	(England) ENG	David Preece	44	0	36	0	5	0	3	0
2	DF	(Scotland) SCO	Michael Hart	14	0	11	0	2	0	1	0
5	DF	(Scotland) SCO	Russell Anderson (c)	32	5	25	5	4	0	3	0
6	DF	(Scotland) SCO	Phil McGuire	21	2	17	2	3	0	1	0
7	FW	(England) ENG	Leigh Hinds	37	7	30	5	5	0	2	2
8	MF	(Scotland) SCO	Steve Tosh	33	6	26	3	4	0	3	3
9	FW	(Scotland) SCO	Scott Booth	26	10	21	8	3	1	2	1
10	MF	(Scotland) SCO	Paul Sheerin	39	2	33	1	3	0	3	1
11	FW	(Scotland) SCO	Darren Mackie	18	0	16	0	0	0	2	0
14	MF	(Scotland) SCO	Chris Clark	30	3	23	2	5	1	2	0
15	DF	(Scotland) SCO	Kevin Rutkiewicz	19	0	16	0	1	0	2	0
16	MF	(Scotland) SCO	Fergus Tiernan	8	0	6	0	1	0	1	0
17	DF	(Scotland) SCO	Kevin McNaughton	21	0	17	0	2	0	2	0
18	DF	(Scotland) SCO	Richard Foster	21	1	18	1	3	0	0	0
19	FW	(Australia) AUS	David Zdrilic	38	8	31	4	5	2	2	2
21	FW	(Scotland) SCO	Bryan Prunty	22	2	18	2	4	0	0	0
22	MF	(Scotland) SCO	Scott Muirhead	40	2	32	0	5	1	3	1
23	GK	(Scotland) SCO	Ryan Esson	2	0	2	0	0	0	0	0
24	DF	(Scotland) SCO	Scott Morrison	32	1	27	1	5	0	0	0
25	DF	(Scotland) SCO	Duncan Jones	0	0	0	0	0	0	0	0
26	MF	(Scotland) SCO	Kevin Souter	3	0	3	0	0	0	0	0
27	DF	(Scotland) SCO	Zander Diamond	26	2	19	2	5	0	2	0
28	FW	(Scotland) SCO	Steven Tarditi	1	0	1	0	0	0	0	0
29	MF	(Finland) FIN	Marcus Heikkinen	46	1	38	0	5	1	3	0
30	DF	(Scotland) SCO	Murray McCulloch	3	0	3	0	0	0	0	0
31	DF	(Scotland) SCO	Craig Higgins	4	0	4	0	0	0	0	0
32	FW	(Scotland) SCO	John Stewart	8	0	8	0	0	0	0	0
33	MF	(Scotland) SCO	Richard Buckley	8	0	8	0	0	0	0	0
34	DF	(Scotland) SCO	David Donald	1	0	1	0	0	0	0	0
36	DF	(Scotland) SCO	Andrew Considine	1	0	1	0	0	0	0	0
38	DF	(Scotland) SCO	Ryan O'Leary	2	0	2	0	0	0	0	0
43	GK	(Scotland) SCO	David Hutton	0	0	0	0	0	0	0	0
95	FW	(England) ENG	Michael Bird	3	0	2	0	0	0	1	0
96	DF	(Scotland) SCO	Jamie McQuilken	8	0	7	0	0	0	1	0
97	DF	(France) FRA	Éric Deloumeaux	14	2	11	2	0	0	3	0
98	DF	(Scotland) SCO	Stephen Payne	0	0	0	0	0	0	0	0
