= Kevin McNaughton =

Scottish footballer (born 1982)

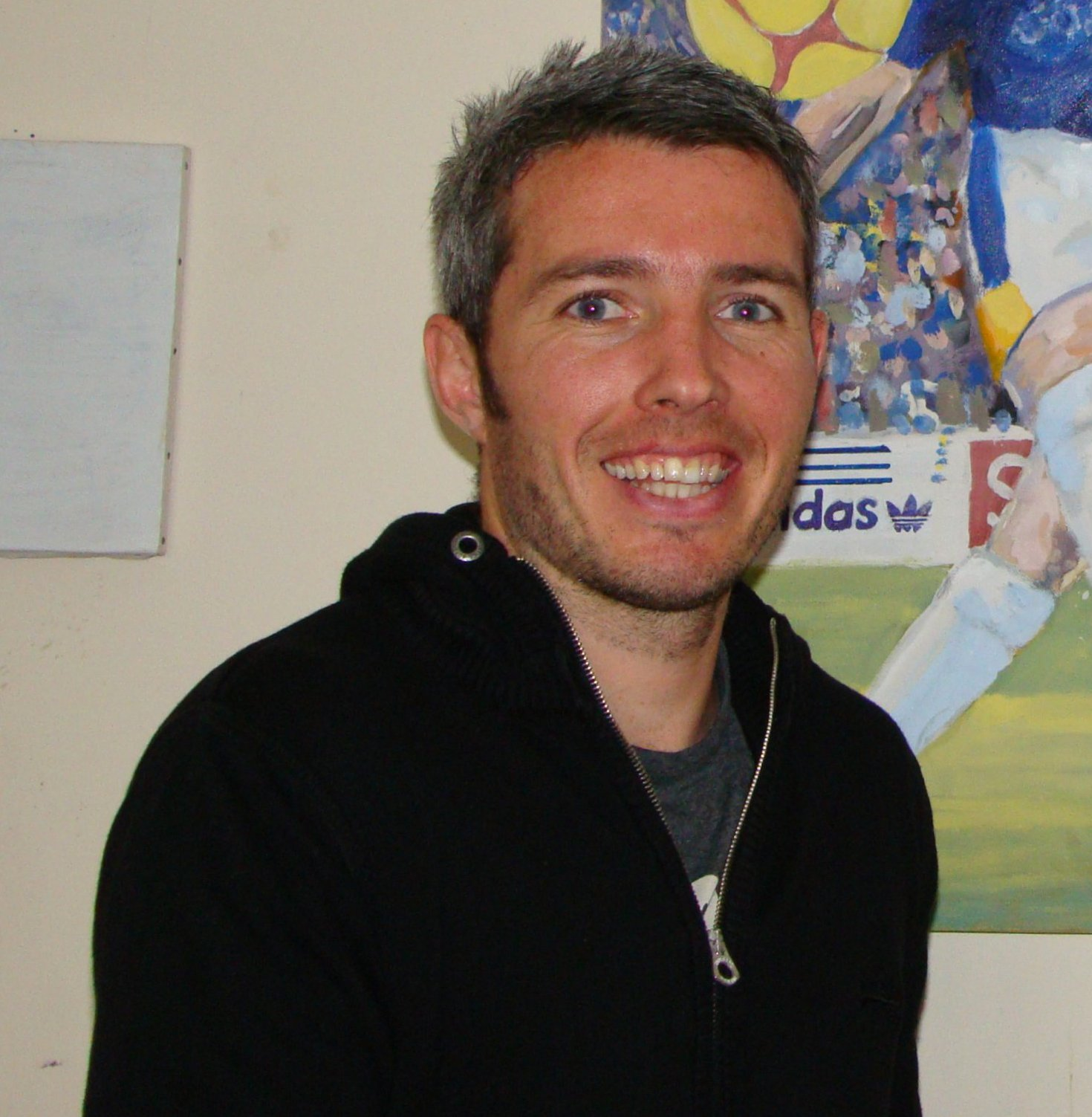
- McNaughton while at Cardiff City in 2011

Personal information
- Full name: Kevin Paul McNaughton
- Date of birth: 28 August 1982 (age 44)
- Place of birth: Dundee, Scotland
- Height: 5 ft 10 in (1.78 m)
- Position: Defender

Team information
- Current team: Dundee North End (co-manager)

Senior career*
Years	Team	Apps	(Gls)
1999–2006	Aberdeen	175	(3)
2006–2015	Cardiff City	254	(1)
2013	→ Bolton Wanderers (loan)	13	(1)
2014–2015	→ Bolton Wanderers (loan)	9	(0)
2015–2016	Wigan Athletic	2	(0)
2016–2017	Inverness Caledonian Thistle	9	(0)
2017–2018	Forfar Athletic	10	(0)
Total		472	(5)

International career
2004	Scotland B	2	(0)
2002–2008	Scotland	4	(0)

Managerial career
- 2022–: Dundee North End (co-manager)
- * Club domestic league appearances and goals

Kevin Paul McNaughton (born 28 August 1982) is a Scottish professional football player and coach who is a co-manager of Midlands Premier League club Dundee North End. A versatile player able to play anywhere in defence, McNaughton was also used in a defensive midfield role. He began his career in the Scottish Premier League, playing for Aberdeen for six years. He joined Cardiff City in 2006, spending nine years at the Welsh side, making over 250 appearances. He had two loan spells at Bolton Wanderers before joining Wigan Athletic on a permanent basis in 2015. He retired from playing football in 2017, after a year with Inverness Caledonian Thistle, but reversed this decision in December 2017 after an injury crisis at Forfar Athletic, where he had joined as a coach the previous month.

== Club career ==
=== Aberdeen ===
Beginning his career in the Scottish Premier League with Aberdeen after coming through the club's youth programme, where he won the Scottish Youth Cup in 2000–01, McNaughton was thrust into the first team at 18, making his debut on 5 October in a 2–1 win over St Mirren, and became a regular for the 2000–01 and 2001–02 seasons in a team containing lots of young players brought through the youth system like Darren Mackie, Russell Anderson and Darren Young. A knee injury sustained in 2002 kept him out for 12 weeks and on his return McNaughton struggled to return to form. It wasn't until new Aberdeen manager Jimmy Calderwood arrived, that he managed to recover his previous form.

During the 2005–06 season, McNaughton was linked with moves to Celtic and Fulham, but nothing came of either and he remained at Pittodrie.

=== Cardiff City ===
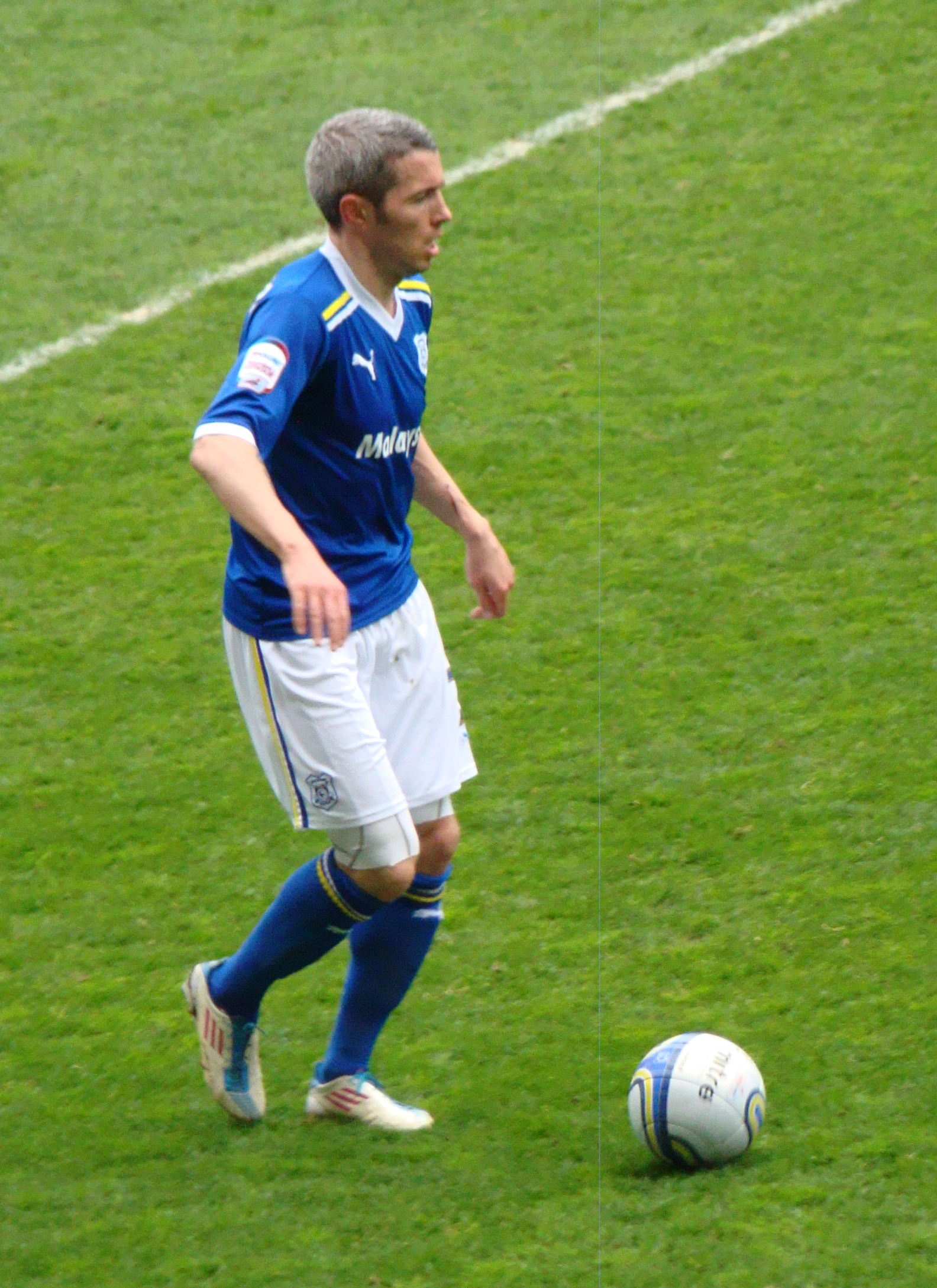
McNaughton playing for Cardiff City in 2012

On 26 May 2006, it was announced that he would be joining Football League Championship side Cardiff City on a free transfer. McNaughton quickly became an important part of manager Dave Jones's plans as he played in the left full-back position, and his form once again earned him a recall to the Scotland national team, although injury robbed him of the chance to take his place in the squad. During his second season at Cardiff, having switched to right-back, McNaughton played in all six matches of the club's run to the 2008 FA Cup Final, including scoring his first goal for the club on 27 January 2008 with a 20-yard volley in a 2–1 victory over Hereford United in the fourth round. His first league goal came just a few months later when he scored on the final day of the season against Barnsley in a 3–0 win.

The start of the 2008–09 season saw McNaughton his 100th appearance for the club when he played against Watford on 21 October.

During a pre-season friendly against Celtic on 22 July 2009 he suffered an ankle injury which kept him out for the opening two months of the season. After appearing for the club's reserve side, he returned to the first team on 17 October 2009 as an unused substitute during a 1–1 draw with Crystal Palace but suffered a recurrence of the injury kept him out until 17 November 2009 when he played 45 minutes of a reserve team game against Hereford United. He returned to the line-up on 21 November 2009 against Barnsley, but was taken off in the 21st minute for Paul Quinn with a back injury. On 23 November McNaughton was sent to have a scan on the back injury, which the club's medical staff believed to have caused the problem and resulted in him being out for two weeks. On 5 December 2009 McNaughton played his first 90 minutes of the season in a 1–0 win over Preston North End. The next season his injury worries ceded and he has played in every league up to and including the game against Barnsley. McNaughton was Cardiff's most consistent defender throughout the 2010–11 season, and won the Player of the Year award.

On 2 May 2011, McNaughton was involved in an incident where he collided with assistant referee Sian Massey. He was later cleared when the FA ruled the incident an accident though it attracted hits and comments on YouTube, with some suggesting the player had deliberately barged into the official. Also McNaughton had captained the side for the first time in their 3–0 loss to Reading in their play-off second leg, on 17 May.

In 2011–12, McNaughton was named as stand-in captain in Mark Hudson's absence starting on 22 November against Coventry City. He went on to make three further appearances as captain, during which time he made his two hundredth league appearance for Cardiff in a 1–0 win over Nottingham Forest on 26 November 2011. He also played a part in the club's League Cup run to their first ever final, which they lost 3–2 on penalties to Liverpool.

McNaughton's 400th league appearance for Cardiff came in a goalless draw at Brighton & Hove Albion on 21 August 2012. McNaughton started over half of City's fixtures in 2012–13, as Cardiff finally achieved promotion to the Premier League. With his contract expiring during the close-season, the club has confirmed that McNaughton has been offered a new deal. On 5 July 2013 it was announced on the official Cardiff City website that McNaughton had signed a new one-year contract extension with the Bluebirds. On 7 March 2014, McNaughton signed a new one-year contract with the Bluebirds.

On 5 May 2015, it was announced after nine years for playing for Cardiff City, McNaughton was to be released at the end of the season upon his contract expiry.

==== Loans to Bolton Wanderers ====
On 27 September 2013, McNaughton joined Bolton on a 28-day emergency loan deal. He made his first appearance for Wanderers four days later in a goalless draw with local rivals Blackpool at Bloomfield Road. After becoming the club's first choice right-back during his stay with Bolton, he scored his first goal for the club in the 1–1 draw with Charlton Athletic on 21 December 2013, this was his first goal in the League since scoring for Cardiff against Barnsley in May 2008.

He returned to Bolton on loan in July 2014.

=== Wigan Athletic ===
On 4 August 2015, McNaughton joined League One side Wigan Athletic on a one-year deal.

=== Inverness Caledonian Thistle ===
McNaughton signed for Inverness Caledonian Thistle during the 2016 close season. In August 2016, McNaughton suffered an achilles injury. He retired from football in July 2017, aged 34.

== International career ==
McNaughton's first call-up for the Scotland squad came in 2002 when he was told by manager Berti Vogts that, at the age of 19, he would earn his first cap in a match against France. However, before the match Vogts told the media in a press conference that McNaughton would not be playing as Vogts deemed he was too nervous, despite not telling McNaughton himself. Instead his first cap came against Nigeria in Scotland's next match.

In his second appearance he was substituted at half-time in a friendly against Denmark. In 2007 McNaughton claimed that Vogts had set his career back by two years with his actions during that time. His move to Cardiff reignited his international career, winning his fourth cap in a match against Czech Republic in May 2008 and being called-up several times.

== Coaching career ==
In November 2017, McNaughton joined Forfar Athletic as first-team coach, later registering himself as a player after an injury crisis at the club. He made his début for Forfar in a 2–0 defeat to Alloa Athletic on 9 December 2017. In August 2017, McNaughton left his playing role at Forfar and signed for SJFA East Super League side, Kirriemuir Thistle, his contract, allowed him to keep his Assistant Manager role at Forfar.

In 2020, McNaughton was working for Dundee as a youth team coach.

In October 2022, McNaughton joined Dundee North End as a player/co-manager alongside Lewis Toshney. Under McNaughton and Toshney, North End won the Quest Engineering Cup in 2023. Going one further the following season, McNaughton and Toshney led the Dokens to the 2023–24 Midlands League title. The title win qualified North End for the 2024–25 Scottish Cup, and led the club in its first ever Scottish Cup campaign to the third round before being defeated in a close-fought match against Scottish Championship side Airdrieonians at a sold-out North End Park.

== Career statistics ==
As of match played on 23 December 2017

Appearances and goals by club, season and competition
Club	Season	League			National cup		League cup		Other		Total	
Club	Season	Division	Apps	Goals	Apps	Goals	Apps	Goals	Apps	Goals	Apps	Goals
Aberdeen	2000–01	Scottish Premier League	33	0	2	0	1	0	2 (Note: Appearances in UEFA Cup)	0	38	0
Aberdeen	2001–02	Scottish Premier League	34	0	3	0	2	0	0	0	39	0
Aberdeen	2002–03	Scottish Premier League	22	1	1	0	0	0	3	0	26	1
Aberdeen	2003–04	Scottish Premier League	17	0	2	0	1	0	0	0	20	0
Aberdeen	2004–05	Scottish Premier League	35	2	3	0	2	0	0	0	40	2
Aberdeen	2005–06	Scottish Premier League	34	0	2	0	2	0	0	0	38	0
Aberdeen	Total		175	3	13	0	7	0	5	0	201	3
Cardiff City	2006–07	Championship	42	0	2	0	0	0	0	0	44	0
Cardiff City	2007–08	Championship	35	1	6	1	2	0	0	0	43	2
Cardiff City	2008–09	Championship	39	0	3	0	2	0	0	0	44	0
Cardiff City	2009–10	Championship	21	0	2	0	0	0	3 (Note: Appearances in Championship play-offs)	0	26	0
Cardiff City	2010–11	Championship	44	0	1	0	0	0	2	0	47	0
Cardiff City	2011–12	Championship	42	0	0	0	5	0	1	0	48	0
Cardiff City	2012–13	Championship	26	0	1	0	0	0	0	0	27	0
Cardiff City	2013–14	Premier League	5	0	2	0	2	0	0	0	9	0
Cardiff City	2014–15	Championship	0	0	0	0	0	0	0	0	0	0
Cardiff City	Total		254	1	17	1	11	0	6	0	288	2
Bolton Wanderers (loan)	2013–14	Championship	13	1	0	0	0	0	0	0	13	1
Bolton Wanderers (loan)	2014–15	Championship	9	0	0	0	0	0	0	0	9	0
Bolton Wanderers (loan)	Total		22	1	0	0	0	0	0	0	22	1
Wigan Athletic	2015–16	League One	2	0	0	0	1	0	0	0	3	0
Inverness Caledonian Thistle	2016–17	Scottish Premiership	9	0	0	0	5	0	—		14	0
Forfar Athletic	2017–18	Scottish League One	3	0	0	0	0	0	—		3	0
Career total			465	5	30	1	24	0	8	0	531	6

== Honours ==
=== Player ===
Cardiff City

- Football League Championship: 2012–13
- FA Cup runner-up: 2007–08
- Football League Cup runner-up: 2011–12

=== Manager ===
Dundee North End

- North-Tayside Inter Regional Cup: 2022–23
- SJFA Midlands League: 2023–24
