= 2004–05 Aberdeen F.C. season =

Aberdeen
2004–05 season
- Chairman: Stewart Milne
- Manager: Jimmy Calderwood
- Stadium: Pittodrie Stadium
- Scottish Premier League: 4th
- Scottish Cup: Quarter-finals
- Scottish League Cup: Fourth round
- Top goalscorer: League: Darren Mackie (10); All: Darren Mackie (11)
- Highest home attendance: 19,028 vs Rangers 7 August 2004
- Lowest home attendance: 4,549 vs Berwick Rangers 24 August 2004
- Average home league attendance: 12,149

The 2004–05 season was Aberdeen's 92nd season in the top flight of Scottish football. Aberdeen competed in the Scottish Premier League, Scottish League Cup, Scottish Cup.

== Scottish Premier League ==
Round	Date	Opponent	H/A	Score	Aberdeen Scorer(s)	Attendance	Report
1	7 August	Rangers	H	0–0		19,028	AFC Heritage
2	14 August	Heart of Midlothian	A	0–0		13,684	AFC Heritage
3	21 August	Dunfermline Athletic	A	1–0	Whelan	8,533	AFC Heritage
4	28 August	Livingston	H	2–0	Craig (2)	13,888	AFC Heritage
5	11 September	Dundee United	A	1–1	Mackie	10,995	AFC Heritage
6	18 September	Kilmarnock	A	1–0	Fowler	6,686	AFC Heritage
7	25 September	Hibernian	H	0–1		12,137	AFC Heritage
8	2 October	Dundee	H	1–1	Heikkinen	11,217	AFC Heritage
9	16 October	Inverness Caledonian Thistle	A	3–1	Adams (2), Mackie	9,530	AFC Heritage
10	23 October	Motherwell	H	2–1	Adams, Serverin	10,737	AFC Heritage
11	27 October	Celtic	A	3–2	Mackie, Pasquinelli, Stewart	57,151	AFC Heritage
12	31 October	Rangers	A	0–5		48,918	AFC Heritage
13	7 November	Heart of Midlothian	H	0–1		13,055	AFC Heritage
14	13 November	Dunfermline Athletic	H	2–1	Tod, Mackie	10,398	AFC Heritage
15	20 November	Livingston	A	2–0	Foster, Mackie	4,569	AFC Heritage
16	27 November	Dundee United	H	1–0	Tosh	12,038	AFC Heritage
17	4 December	Kilmarnock	H	3–2	Pasquinelli (2), Clark	11,139	AFC Heritage
18	11 December	Hibernian	A	1–2	Mackie	13,461	AFC Heritage
19	18 December	Dundee	A	0–1		7,310	AFC Heritage
20	27 December	Inverness Caledonian Thistle	H	0–0		18,250	AFC Heritage
21	3 January	Motherwell	A	0–0		7,948	AFC Heritage
22	16 January	Celtic	H	0–1		17,057	AFC Heritage
23	23 January	Rangers	H	1–2	Mackie	17,495	AFC Heritage
24	29 January	Heart of Midlothian	A	0–1		12,269	AFC Heritage
25	12 February	Dunfermline Athletic	A	1–2	Diamond	5,579	AFC Heritage
26	19 February	Livingston	H	2–0	McNaughton, Whelan	9,214	AFC Heritage
27	2 March	Dundee United	A	2–1	Diamond, Stewart	6,688	AFC Heritage
28	5 March	Kilmarnock	A	1–0	McNaughton	5,181	AFC Heritage
29	12 March	Hibernian	H	3–0	Anderson, Whelan, Mackie	14,465	AFC Heritage
30	19 March	Dundee	H	1–1	Whelan	11,138	AFC Heritage
31	2 April	Inverness Caledonian Thistle	A	1–0	Whelan	7,026	AFC Heritage
32	9 April	Motherwell	H	1–3	Heikkinen	10,443	AFC Heritage
33	16 April	Celtic	A	2–3	Diamond, Mackie	59,998	AFC Heritage
34	23 April	Motherwell	A	1–0	Mackie	5,063	AFC Heritage
35	1 May	Rangers	H	1–3	Clark	17,198	AFC Heritage
36	8 May	Celtic	A	0–2		59,498	AFC Heritage
37	14 May	Hibernian	A	2–1		15,288	AFC Heritage
38	22 May	Heart of Midlothian	H	2–0	Byrne, Adams	16,155	AFC Heritage

== Scottish League Cup ==
Round	Date	Opponent	H/A	Score	Aberdeen Scorer(s)	Attendance	Report
R2	24 August	Berwick Rangers	H	3–0	Diamond, Adams, Craig	4,549	AFC Heritage
R3	22 September	Rangers	H	0–2		14,876	AFC Heritage

== Scottish Cup ==
Round	Date	Opponent	H/A	Score	Aberdeen Scorer(s)	Attendance	Report
R3	8 January	Arbroath	A	2–0	Heiikkinen, Mackie	4,165	AFC Heritage
R4	5 February	Inverness Caledonian Thistle	H	2–1	Mackie (2)	10,595	AFC Heritage
QF	27 February	Dundee United	A	1–4	Byrne	8,661	AFC Heritage

== Squad ==
Note: Flags indicate national team as defined under FIFA eligibility rules; some limited exceptions apply. Players may hold more than one non-FIFA nationality.

No.	Pos.	Nation	Player
1	GK	ENG	David Preece
2	DF	SCO	Phil McGuire
3	DF	SCO	Kevin McNaughton
4	DF	SCO	Russell Anderson (Captain)
5	DF	SCO	Zander Diamond
6	MF	SCO	Scott Severin
7	MF	FIN	Markus Paatelainen
7	MF	SCO	Steve Tosh
8	MF	FIN	Markus Heikkinen
9	FW	SCO	Steven Craig
10	MF	SCO	Derek Adams
11	MF	SCO	Chris Clark
14	FW	SCO	Darren Mackie
15	DF	SCO	Michael Hart

No.	Pos.	Nation	Player
16	MF	SCO	Scott Morrison
17	FW	ISL	Thorarinn Kristjansson
18	DF	SCO	Scott Muirhead
19	FW	SCO	John Stewart
20	GK	SCO	Ryan Esson
21	DF	SCO	Richard Foster
22	MF	SCO	Jamie Winter
23	FW	ENG	Noel Whelan
24	FW	ARG	Fernando Pasquinelli
25	MF	IRL	Gary Dempsey
27	DF	IRL	Richie Byrne
28	FW	FIN	Mikko Paatelainen
29	FW	CZE	Lubomir Blaha
50	GK	SCG	Saša Ilić

=== Appearances & Goals ===
No.	Pos	Nat	Player	Total		SPL		Scottish Cup		League Cup	
No.	Pos	Nat	Player	Apps	Goals	Apps	Goals	Apps	Goals	Apps	Goals
1	GK	(England) ENG	David Preece	19	0	17	0	0	0	2	0
2	DF	(Scotland) SCO	Phil McGuire	34	0	30	0	2	0	2	0
3	DF	(Scotland) SCO	Kevin McNaughton	40	2	35	2	3	0	2	0
4	DF	(Scotland) SCO	Russell Anderson (c)	36	1	31	1	3	0	2	0
5	DF	(Scotland) SCO	Zander Diamond	31	4	29	3	1	0	1	1
6	MF	(Scotland) SCO	Scott Severin	33	1	31	1	0	0	2	0
8	MF	(Finland) FIN	Marcus Heikkinen	34	3	30	2	3	1	1	0
9	FW	(Scotland) SCO	Steven Craig	17	3	14	2	1	0	2	1
10	MF	(Scotland) SCO	Derek Adams	24	5	20	4	2	0	2	1
11	MF	(Scotland) SCO	Chris Clark	34	2	31	2	3	0	0	0
14	FW	(Scotland) SCO	Darren Mackie	38	15	34	12	3	3	1	0
15	DF	(Scotland) SCO	Michael Hart	37	0	32	0	3	0	2	0
16	DF	(Scotland) SCO	Scott Morrison	14	0	11	0	2	0	1	0
17	FW	(Iceland) ISL	Thorarinn Kristjansson	3	0	3	0	0	0	0	0
18	MF	(Scotland) SCO	Scott Muirhead	15	0	14	0	0	0	1	0
19	FW	(Scotland) SCO	John Stewart	29	2	25	2	3	0	1	0
20	GK	(Scotland) SCO	Ryan Esson	26	0	23	0	3	0	0	0
21	DF	(Scotland) SCO	Richard Foster	28	1	26	1	1	0	1	0
22	MF	(Scotland) SCO	Jamie Winter	14	0	12	0	2	0	0	0
23	FW	(England) ENG	Noel Whelan	23	5	20	5	3	0	0	0
24	MF	(Republic of Ireland) IRL	Gary Dempsey	4	0	4	0	0	0	0	0
25	DF	(Scotland) SCO	Andrew Considine	1	0	1	0	0	0	0	0
27	DF	(Republic of Ireland) IRL	Richie Byrne	15	2	13	1	2	1	0	0
29	FW	(Czech Republic) CZE	Lubomír Blaha	8	0	8	0	0	0	0	0
Players who left the club during the season
7	MF	(Scotland) SCO	Steve Tosh	20	1	17	1	1	0	2	0
7	MF	(Finland) FIN	Markus Paatelainen	0	0	0	0	0	0	0	0
17	MF	(Scotland) SCO	Fergus Tiernan	1	0	0	0	0	0	1	0
22	MF	(Scotland) SCO	Richard Buckley	0	0	0	0	0	0	0	0
24	FW	(Argentina) ARG	Fernando Pasquinelli	10	3	10	3	0	0	0	0

Pos	Team	Pld	W	D	L	GF	GA	GD	Pts	Qualification or relegation (Note: Teams played each other three times (33 matches), before the league split into two groups (the top six and the bottom six) for the last five matches.)
2	Celtic	38	30	2	6	85	35	+50	92	Qualification for the Champions League second qualifying round
3	Hibernian	38	18	7	13	64	57	+7	61	Qualification for the UEFA Cup first round
4	Aberdeen	38	18	7	13	44	39	+5	61	
5	Heart of Midlothian	38	13	11	14	43	41	+2	50	
6	Motherwell	38	13	9	16	46	49	−3	48	

Source: Scottish Professional Football League
Rules for classification: 1) Points; 2) Goal difference; 3) Goals scored
