= 2005–06 Aberdeen F.C. season =

Aberdeen
2005–06 season
- Chairman: Stewart Milne
- Manager: Jimmy Calderwood
- Stadium: Pittodrie Stadium
- Scottish Premier League: 6th
- Scottish Cup: Fourth Round
- Scottish League Cup: Quarter-finals
- Top goalscorer: League: Steve Lovell (8); All: Steve Lovell (9)
- Highest home attendance: 18,182 vs Rangers 14 August 2005
- Lowest home attendance: 4,398 vs Berwick Rangers 23 August 2005
- Average home league attendance: 12,795

The 2005–06 season was Aberdeen's 93rd season in the top flight of Scottish football. Aberdeen competed in the Scottish Premier League, Scottish League Cup, Scottish Cup.

== Scottish Premier League ==
Round	Date	Opponent	H/A	Score	Aberdeen Scorer(s)	Attendance	Report
1	30 July	Dundee United	A	1–1	Nicholson	12,404	AFC Heritage
2	6 August	Kilmarnock	H	1–2	Anderson	13,661	AFC Heritage
3	14 August	Rangers	H	3–2	Anderson, Lovell, Smith	18,182	AFC Heritage
4	20 August	Heart of Midlothian	A	0–2		16,139	AFC Heritage
5	27 August	Falkirk	H	3–0	Smith (2), Clark	12,249	AFC Heritage
6	10 September	Celtic	A	0–2		59,607	AFC Heritage
7	17 September	Dunfermline Athletic	A	2–0	Crawford, Severin	6,387	AFC Heritage
8	24 September	Livingston	H	0–0		12,402	AFC Heritage
9	1 October	Motherwell	H	2–2	Mackie (2)	11,448	AFC Heritage
10	15 October	Inverness Caledonian Thistle	A	1–1	Smith	6,809	AFC Heritage
11	22 October	Hibernian	H	0–1		13,375	AFC Heritage
12	25 October	Dundee United	H	2–0	Smith, Crawford	10,720	AFC Heritage
13	29 October	Kilmarnock	A	2–4	Anderson, Crawford	5,798	AFC Heritage
14	5 November	Rangers	A	0–0		49,717	AFC Heritage
15	20 November	Heart of Midlothian	H	1–1	Smith	14,901	AFC Heritage
16	26 November	Falkirk	A	2–1	Clark, Anderson	5,826	AFC Heritage
17	4 December	Celtic	H	1–3	Winter	17,031	AFC Heritage
18	10 December	Dunfermline Athletic	H	0–0		9,881	AFC Heritage
19	17 December	Livingston	A	0–0		3,724	AFC Heritage
20	26 December	Motherwell Thistle	A	1–3	Stewart	6,555	AFC Heritage
21	31 December	Inverness Caledonian Thistle	H	0–0		12,266	AFC Heritage
22	14 January	Hibernian	A	2–1	Crawford, Mackie	14,572	AFC Heritage
23	21 January	Dundee United	A	1–1	Mackie	9,936	AFC Heritage
24	28 January	Kilmarnock	H	2–2	Nicholson, Anderson	10,540	AFC Heritage
25	8 February	Rangers	H	2–0	Smith, Lovell	17,087	AFC Heritage
26	11 February	Heart of Midlothian	A	2–1	Pressley, Clark	16,895	AFC Heritage
27	18 February	Falkirk	H	1–0	Smith	11,538	AFC Heritage
28	4 March	Celtic	A	0–3		60,018	AFC Heritage
29	11 March	Dunfermline Athletic	A	0–1		5,308	AFC Heritage
30	18 March	Livingston	H	3–0	Anderson, Lovell, Snoyl	9,229	AFC Heritage
31	25 March	Motherwell	H	2–2	Lovell (2)	10,212	AFC Heritage
32	1 April	Inverness Caledonian Thistle	A	1–0	Lovell	7,368	AFC Heritage
33	8 April	Hibernian	H	1–0	Severin	14,110	AFC Heritage
34	15 April	Rangers	A	1–1	Severin	48,987	AFC Heritage
35	22 April	Kimarnock	H	0–0		10,634	AFC Heritage
36	29 April	Hibernian	H	4–0	Lovell (2), Crawford, Foster	10,490	AFC Heritage
37	3 May	Heart of Midlothian	A	0–1		17,327	AFC Heritage
38	7 May	Celtic	H	2–2	Stewart (2)	14,597	AFC Heritage

== Scottish League Cup ==
Round	Date	Opponent	H/A	Score	Aberdeen Scorer(s)	Attendance	Report
R2	23 August	Berwick Rangers	H	3–0	Winter, McNicol, Lovell	4,398	AFC Heritage
R3	20 September	Stranraer	A	2–0	Smith, Nicholson	2,200	AFC Heritage
QF	5 November	Motherwell	A	0–1		3,989	AFC Heritage

== Scottish Cup ==
Round	Date	Opponent	H/A	Score	Aberdeen Scorer(s)	Attendance	Report
R3	7 January	Dundee United	A	3–2	Crawford (2), Nicholson	8,218	AFC Heritage
R4	4 February	Heart of Midlothian	A	0–3		17,353	AFC Heritage

== Squad ==
=== Appearances & Goals ===
No.	Pos	Nat	Player	Total		SPL		Scottish Cup		League Cup	
No.	Pos	Nat	Player	Apps	Goals	Apps	Goals	Apps	Goals	Apps	Goals
1	GK	(Scotland) SCO	Ryan Esson	19	0	18	0	0	0	1	0
2	DF	(Scotland) SCO	Michael Hart	4	0	4	0	0	0	0	0
3	DF	(Scotland) SCO	Kevin McNaughton	38	0	34	0	2	0	2	0
4	DF	(Scotland) SCO	Russell Anderson (c)	40	6	36	6	2	0	2	0
5	DF	(Scotland) SCO	Zander Diamond	37	0	33	0	1	0	3	0
6	MF	(Scotland) SCO	Scott Severin	32	3	28	3	1	0	3	0
7	MF	(Scotland) SCO	Jamie Smith	40	9	35	8	2	0	3	1
8	MF	(Scotland) SCO	Barry Nicholson	38	4	33	2	2	1	3	1
9	FW	(England) ENG	Steve Lovell	29	9	27	8	1	0	1	1
10	FW	(Scotland) SCO	Darren Mackie	30	4	28	4	1	0	1	0
11	MF	(Scotland) SCO	Chris Clark	36	2	31	2	2	0	3	0
14	MF	(Republic of Ireland) IRL	Gary Dempsey	28	0	24	0	1	0	3	0
15	MF	(Scotland) SCO	Jamie Winter	8	2	7	1	0	0	1	1
15	MF	(Netherlands) NED	Ferne Snoyl	13	1	12	1	1	0	0	0
16	FW	(Scotland) SCO	John Stewart	20	3	17	3	1	0	2	0
17	DF	(Republic of Ireland) IRL	Richie Byrne	22	0	19	0	1	0	2	0
19	DF	(Scotland) SCO	Richard Foster	28	1	25	1	2	0	1	0
20	GK	(Scotland) SCO	Jamie Langfield	24	0	20	0	2	0	2	0
21	DF	(Scotland) SCO	Andrew Considine	14	0	12	0	1	0	1	0
22	MF	(Scotland) SCO	Kyle Macaulay	6	0	5	0	1	0	0	0
23	FW	(Scotland) SCO	Stevie Crawford	34	7	30	5	2	2	2	0
26	FW	(Scotland) SCO	Chris Maguire	1	0	1	0	0	0	0	0
27	DF	(Scotland) SCO	David Donald	1	0	1	0	0	0	0	0
29	MF	(Scotland) SCO	Neil MacFarlane	6	0	6	0	0	0	0	0
31	DF	(Northern Ireland) NIR	Danny Griffin	12	0	10	0	2	0	0	0
Players who left the club during the season
18	MF	(Scotland) SCO	Scott Muirhead	21	0	18	0	0	0	3	0
24	MF	(Scotland) SCO	Derek Adams	0	0	0	0	0	0	0	0
25	FW	(Scotland) SCO	Steven Craig	4	0	3	0	0	0	1	0
30	GK	(England) ENG	David Preece	0	0	0	0	0	0	0	0

Pos	Team	Pld	W	D	L	GF	GA	GD	Pts	Qualification or relegation (Note: Teams played each other three times (33 matches), before the league split into two groups (the top six and the bottom six) for the last five matches.)
4	Hibernian	38	17	5	16	61	56	+5	56	Qualification for the UEFA Intertoto Cup second round (Note: Hibernian qualified for the 2006 UEFA Intertoto Cup by being the highest place applicant for the competition.)
5	Kilmarnock	38	15	10	13	63	64	−1	55	
6	Aberdeen	38	13	15	10	46	40	+6	54	
7	Inverness Caledonian Thistle	38	15	13	10	51	38	+13	58	
8	Motherwell	38	13	10	15	55	61	−6	49	

Source: Scottish Professional Football League
Rules for classification: 1) Points; 2) Goal difference; 3) Goals scored
