= David Preece (footballer, born 1976) =

English footballer

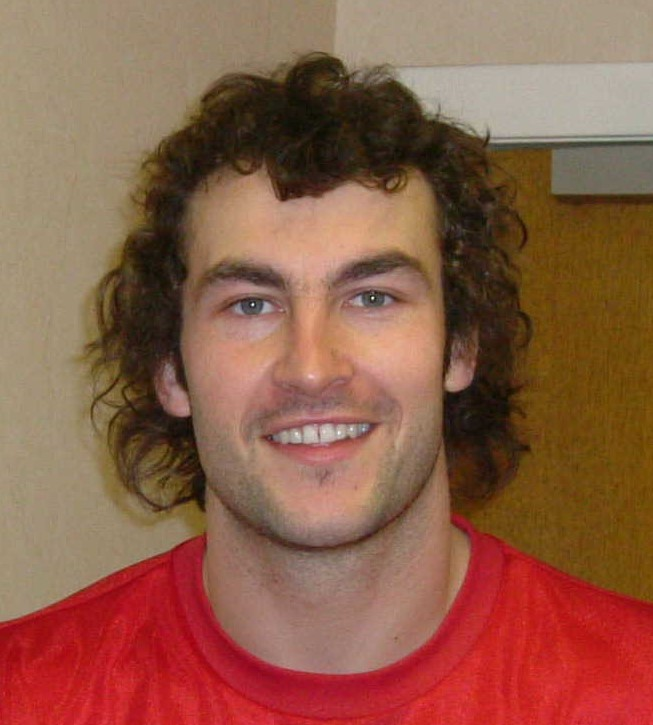
- Preece in 2005

Personal information
- Full name: David Douglas Preece
- Date of birth: 26 August 1976 (age 50)
- Place of birth: Sunderland, England
- Height: 6 ft 2 in (1.88 m)
- Position: Goalkeeper

Team information
- Current team: Lincoln City (goalkeeping coach)

Youth career
- ?–1994: Sunderland

Senior career*
Years	Team	Apps	(Gls)
1994–1997	Sunderland	0	(0)
1997–1999	Darlington	106	(0)
1999–2005	Aberdeen	89	(0)
2005–2008	Silkeborg IF	74	(0)
2008–2009	OB	0	(0)
2009–2012	Barnsley	7	(0)
2012–2013	Lincoln City	8	(0)
2013	→ Keflavík (loan)	0	(0)
2013	Keflavík	9	(0)
2013–2016	Lincoln City	1	(0)
Total		294	(0)
- * Club domestic league appearances and goals

David Douglas Preece (born 26 August 1976) is an English football journalist and commentator and a former professional player and coach who played as a goalkeeper. He is currently the goalkeeping coach for Lincoln City.

He made the majority of his appearances for Darlington, Aberdeen and the Danish club Silkeborg. His final professional appearance came on 2 November 2013 for Lincoln City against Welling United.

== Career ==
=== Early career ===
Preece was born Sunderland, Tyne and Wear. He began his football career in his hometown at Sunderland but failed to make a senior appearance before joining Darlington for free on a two-year deal. At Darlington, Preece made over 100 appearances in two seasons before leaving Darlington to move to Scotland by joining Aberdeen. Since leaving Darlington, the club attempted to re-sign Preece but the move never materialised. At Aberdeen, Preece made over 100 appearances in 6 seasons and faced competition from Jim Leighton, Peter Kjær and Ryan Esson. Up until Kjær's retirement, Preece began to get more playing time and captained the team on several occasions, until the club decided to transfer list Preece along with three other players.

In 2005, Preece left Scotland to move to Denmark by joining Silkeborg IF first and OB second. At Silkeborg, Preece was a first-choice goalkeeper until he left for OB where his first-team opportunities began to decline due to Arkadiusz Onyszko pushing him out of the first team.

=== Barnsley ===
After being released by OB, Preece returned to England by joining Barnsley free on a one-year contract, with the option to extend the contract by a further year, and was expected to compete with Luke Steele. After spending the first half of the season on the bench, Preece's big chance of his first team came when he made his debut for the club (and first team in English football for 10 years) in a 1–0 loss against Watford on 12 September 2009 and continued in goal for three consecutive games until Steele returned. At the end of the season, Preece signed another one-year deal despite being Barnsley's back-up goalkeeper. Preece continued to be a back-up goalkeeper and during the 2011–12 season, Preece suffered a wrist injury while warming up ahead of a match against Southampton, resulting him out of the rest of the season At the end of the season, Preece was released along with six other players, ending a three-year spell at Barnsley.

=== Lincoln City ===
On 5 December 2012, Preece signed non-contract terms with Lincoln City and made his debut in a 4–2 win over Dartford. On 28 December 2012 his contract was made permanent until the end of the season in a player-coach capacity. Preece played a pivotal role in saving Lincoln from relegation.

=== Keflavik ===
In April 2013, Preece joined Icelandic Premier League team Keflavík on a short-term deal following a brief loan. Preece made this decision to ensure he was as fit as possible for the start of the English football league season in August 2013.

=== Return to Lincoln ===
On 8 August 2013, Preece re-signed for Lincoln City on a one-year deal, also becoming the club's first team goalkeeping coach.

== Career statistics ==
Club	Season	League			Scottish Cup		League Cup		Europe		Total	
Club	Season	Division	Apps	Goals	Apps	Goals	Apps	Goals	Apps	Goals	Apps	Goals
Aberdeen	1999-00	SPL	10	0	0	0	2	0	0	0	12	0
Aberdeen	2000-01	SPL	2	0	2	0	0	0	0	0	4	0
Aberdeen	2001-02	SPL	8	0	0	0	0	0	0	0	8	0
Aberdeen	2002-03	SPL	16	0	3	0	0	0	0	0	19	0
Aberdeen	2003-04	SPL	36	0	5	0	3	0	0	0	44	0
Aberdeen	2004-05	SPL	17	0	0	0	2	0	0	0	19	0
Aberdeen	2005-06	SPL	0	0	0	0	0	0	0	0	0	0
Aberdeen	Total		89	0	10	0	7	0	0	0	106	0
