= Zander Diamond =

Scottish footballer

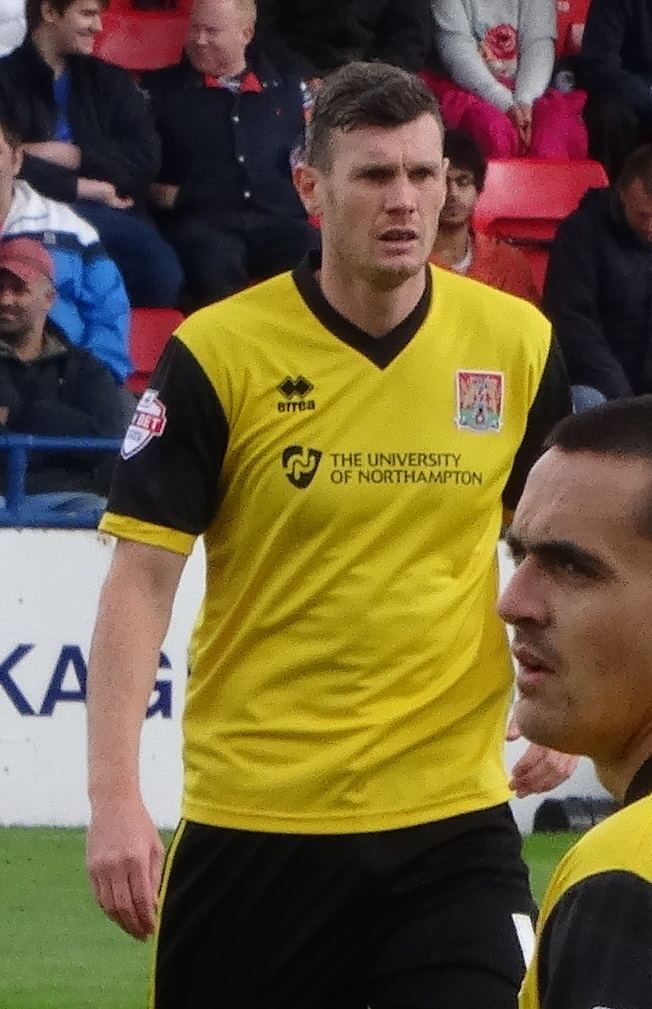
- Diamond with Northampton in 2014

Personal information
- Full name: Alexander Kevin Diamond
- Date of birth: 12 March 1985 (age 41)
- Place of birth: Alexandria, Scotland
- Height: 6 ft 2 in (1.88 m)
- Position: Centre-back

Team information
- Current team: Broomhill (manager)

Youth career
- –2003: Aberdeen

Senior career*
Years	Team	Apps	(Gls)
2003–2011	Aberdeen	205	(16)
2011–2012	Oldham Athletic	23	(2)
2012–2014	Burton Albion	47	(5)
2014	→ Northampton Town (loan)	14	(1)
2014–2017	Northampton Town	113	(2)
2017–2018	Mansfield Town	16	(0)
Total		418	(26)

International career
2004–2006	Scotland U21	11	(1)
2004	Scotland B	1	(0)

Managerial career
- 2024–2025: Broomhill
- * Club domestic league appearances and goals

Alexander Kevin "Zander" Diamond (born 12 March 1985) is a Scottish former professional footballer and current manager of Lowland League club Broomhill.

Diamond played as a centre-back and began his career with Scottish Premier League club Aberdeen, before moving to Oldham Athletic in 2011; he later played for Burton Albion, Northampton Town and Mansfield Town in England. He won eleven caps for Scotland under-21s.

== Club career ==
=== Aberdeen ===
Born in Alexandria and raised in Dumbarton, Diamond graduated from the youth team at Aberdeen in his first full season and made his League debut against Dundee United at Tannadice, coming on as a substitute at half time in 2003–04 season. He made his first start for the club in a Scottish League Cup match against Dumbarton in September 2004. Later in the same season, he scored his first senior goal for the club in a 3–1 win against Kilmarnock at Pittodrie. He won the "Young Player of the Month" award for February.

In the 2005–06 season, Jimmy Calderwood was appointed Aberdeen manager. He quickly signed Diamond to a long-term contract after he played successfully alongside Aberdeen captain Russell Anderson.

However, in season 2007–08, Aberdeen qualified for the UEFA Cup group section after beating Dnipro on away goals. They were drawn in Group B against Panathanaikos, Lokomotiv Moscow, Atlético Madrid and FC Copenhagen. Diamond scored in the 1–1 draw against Lokomotiv Moscow, and Branislav Ivanović scored the equaliser. After qualifying from the group, they faced Bayern Munich in the last 32, drawing 2–2 at Pittodrie in the first leg. They went out on aggregate 7–3 after a 5–1 defeat in the Allianz Arena. On 18 January 2009, he achieved the feat of scoring twice against Celtic in an SPL match at Pittodrie which Aberdeen won 4–2.

Diamond made 249 appearances for Aberdeen over eight seasons, scoring 19 goals.

=== Oldham Athletic ===
Having previously been expected to sign for Hearts before an ankle injury was identified, on 13 July 2011 Diamond signed a one-year contract with Oldham Athletic. His first goal for the club on 30 July 2011 came with a headed goal against Fleetwood Town in a pre–season friendly, which Oldham Athletic won, 1–0. He made his competitive club debut on the first day of the 2011–12 season, starting the Football League match against Sheffield United.

=== Burton Albion ===
On 5 June 2012, Diamond signed with League Two club Burton Albion.

He made his debut against Sheffield United at Bramall Lane in the first round of the League Cup, which Burton won on penalties. Diamond scored his first goal for the club in a 6–2 home win against AFC Wimbledon. After finishing 4th, the highest in the club's history in the Football League, they were beaten in the playoffs by eventual winners Bradford City. On 26 May, Burton called him back to play in their Play-Off Final game against Fleetwood Town. He started on the bench but came on as a sub.

=== Northampton Town ===
On 21 February 2014, Diamond joined League Two side Northampton Town on loan for the remainder of the 2013–14 season. On 7 May 2014, Diamond signed a three-year contract for the Cobblers after a successful loan spell with the club. The move became effective at the start of pre-season, at which time he spoke of his positive experiences in English football and the relative anonymity he enjoyed compared with living in Aberdeen.

He made over 100 league appearances for Northampton, experiencing a promotion as winners of League Two in 2016 and maintaining the club's status in League One in the following season. He was named the club's 'Player of the year' for 2017, but despite this he was one of several players allowed to leave when their contracts expired.

=== Mansfield Town ===
Diamond joined Mansfield Town of EFL League Two on 12 May 2017.

He was transfer-listed by Mansfield at the end of the 2017–18 season. Diamond retired in October 2018 due to injury.

== International career ==
Having earlier appeared for the Under-19s and Under-20s, Diamond captained the Scottish under-21 international side, winning 11 caps and scoring once, between 2004 and 2006. He also appeared once for the B team in December 2004.

== Career statistics ==
As of match played 10 March 2018

Appearances and goals by club, season and competition
Club	Season	League			FA Cup		League Cup		Other		Total	
Club	Season	Division	Apps	Goals	Apps	Goals	Apps	Goals	Apps	Goals	Apps	Goals
Aberdeen	2002–03	Scottish Premier League	1	0	0	0	0	0	0	0	1	0
Aberdeen	2003–04	Scottish Premier League	19	2	5	0	2	0	0	0	26	2
Aberdeen	2004–05	Scottish Premier League	29	3	1	0	1	1	0	0	31	4
Aberdeen	2005–06	Scottish Premier League	33	0	1	0	3	0	0	0	37	0
Aberdeen	2006–07	Scottish Premier League	21	0	0	0	0	0	0	0	21	0
Aberdeen	2007–08	Scottish Premier League	26	3	6	1	2	0	7	1	41	5
Aberdeen	2008–09	Scottish Premier League	28	4	3	0	1	0	0	0	32	4
Aberdeen	2009–10	Scottish Premier League	16	3	2	0	0	0	0	0	18	3
Aberdeen	2010–11	Scottish Premier League	32	1	5	0	4	0	0	0	41	1
Aberdeen	Total		205	16	23	1	13	1	7	1	248	19
Oldham Athletic	2011–12	League One	23	2	4	0	1	0	3	0	31	2
Burton Albion	2012–13	League Two	37	4	2	1	3	0	2	0	44	5
Burton Albion	2013–14	League Two	10	1	3	0	0	0	1	0	11	1
Burton Albion	Total		47	5	5	1	3	0	3	0	55	6
Northampton Town	2013–14	League Two	14	1	0	0	0	0	0	0	14	1
Northampton Town	2014–15	League Two	21	1	0	0	2	0	0	0	23	1
Northampton Town	2015–16	League Two	39	1	3	1	1	0	0	0	42	2
Northampton Town	2016–17	League One	39	0	1	0	3	0	2	0	45	0
Northampton Town	Total		113	3	4	1	6	0	2	0	125	4
Mansfield Town	2017–18	League Two	16	3	2	0	0	0	1	1	0	0
Career total			404	29	38	3	23	1	13	1	478	34

== Honours ==
Northampton Town

- Football League Two: 2015–16
