= Michael Hart (footballer) =

Scottish footballer

Personal information
- Date of birth: 10 February 1980 (age 46)
- Place of birth: Bellshill, Scotland
- Position: Right back

Senior career*
Years	Team	Apps	(Gls)
1997–2001	Aberdeen	16	(0)
2000	→ Livingston (loan)	3	(0)
2000–2001	→ Livingston (loan)	22	(0)
2001–2003	Livingston	32	(0)
2003–2008	Aberdeen	107	(0)
2008–2010	Preston North End	19	(0)
2010–2012	Hibernian	24	(0)
2012	St Johnstone	0	(0)
2012	Airdrie United	9	(0)
2013	Huntly	15	(0)
Total		247	(0)
- * Club domestic league appearances and goals

Michael Hart (born 10 February 1980) is a Scottish retired footballer who played as a right back for Aberdeen, Livingston, Preston North End, Hibernian, St Johnstone, Airdrie United and Huntly.

== Career ==
Hart came through the ranks at Aberdeen and made his debut in a 1–1 draw with Dunfermline Athletic in 1998. He made a total of 19 first team appearances before moving on to Livingston on loan in 2000. His move to Livingston was made permanent in July 2001 and he helped them to a third-place finish in their first season in the SPL, which gave them qualification for the 2002–03 UEFA Cup.

Hart returned to Aberdeen in February 2003 and, after a shaky start, established himself as a fleet-footed, quick tackling right back. He missed most of the 2005–06 season due to a knee injury, featuring in only four matches. He came back into the team for the 2006–07 season and featured in almost every game, helping the club to a third-place finish in the league. In July 2007, Hart was involved in a car crash whilst on tour with Aberdeen in Egypt, along with team-mate Jamie Smith. Neither player was seriously hurt.

In January 2008, Hart signed a pre-contract agreement with Preston North End and was expected to move to Deepdale at the end of the season. However, on 31 January, Preston had an offer thought to be £100,000 accepted for the right-back. Hart then suffered from a succession of injuries, making only 25 appearances for Preston in over two years with the club. Preston manager Darren Ferguson listed Hart for transfer in May 2010.

Hart returned to Scotland in July 2010, with Hibernian, after his contract with Preston was cancelled. Hart's preferred position of right back had been a significant problem for Hibs during the previous season. He had been a target for Hibs manager John Hughes, who had been unable to sign him previously for "different reasons". Shortly after signing, Hart scored his first goal for 12 years and his first ever in club football, in a friendly against ADO Den Haag.

Hart suffered a serious groin injury in a friendly match against Sunderland in August 2011. He made a handful of appearances for Hibs in the 2011–12 season, before he was released from his contract by mutual consent on 31 January 2012.

Hart then signed for St Johnstone on a short-term contract until the end of the 2011–12 season. He joined Airdrie United in July 2012, but left in November the same year to pursue a full-time career outwith football.

Huntly signed Hart on 20 February 2013. But on 20 September 2013 Hart retired from football.

== Career statistics ==
Appearances and goals by club, season and competition
Club	Season	League			National Cup		League Cup		Europe		Other		Total	
Club	Season	Division	Apps	Goals	Apps	Goals	Apps	Goals	Apps	Goals	Apps	Goals	Apps	Goals
Aberdeen	1996–97	Scottish Premier Division	0	0	0	0	0	0	0	0	-	-	0	0
Aberdeen	1997–98	Scottish Premier Division	0	0	0	0	0	0	0	0	-	-	0	0
Aberdeen	1998–99	SPL	13	0	1	0	0	0	0	0	-	-	14	0
Aberdeen	1999–00	SPL	3	0	0	0	2	0	0	0	-	-	5	0
Aberdeen	2000–01	SPL	0	0	0	0	0	0	0	0	-	-	0	0
Aberdeen	Total		16	0	1	0	2	0	0	0	-	-	19	0
Livingston (loan)	1999–00	Scottish First Division	3	0	0	0	0	0	-	-	-	-	3	0
Livingston (loan)	2000–01	Scottish First Division	22	0	0	0	0	0	-	-	2	0	24	0
Livingston	2001–02	SPL	21	0	2	0	2	0	0	0	-	-	25	0
Livingston	2002–03	SPL	11	0	0	0	0	0	2	0	-	-	13	0
Livingston	Total		57	0	2	0	2	0	2	0	2	0	65	0
Aberdeen	2002–03	SPL	8	0	1	0	0	0	0	0	-	-	9	0
Aberdeen	2003–04	SPL	11	0	2	0	1	0	0	0	-	-	14	0
Aberdeen	2004–05	SPL	32	0	3	0	2	0	0	0	-	-	37	0
Aberdeen	2005–06	SPL	4	0	0	0	0	0	0	0	-	-	4	0
Aberdeen	2006–07	SPL	34	0	2	0	0	0	0	0	-	-	36	0
Aberdeen	2007–08	SPL	18	0	0	0	2	0	6	0	-	-	26	0
Aberdeen	Total		107	0	8	0	5	0	6	0	-	-	126	0
Preston North End	2007–08	Championship	2	0	0	0	0	0	-	-	-	-	2	0
Preston North End	2008–09	Championship	6	0	0	0	2	0	-	-	-	-	8	0
Preston North End	2009–10	Championship	11	0	1	0	3	0	-	-	-	-	15	0
Preston North End	Total		19	0	1	0	5	0	-	-	-	-	25	0
Hibernian	2010–11	SPL	18	0	1	0	1	0	2	0	-	-	22	0
Hibernian	2011–12	SPL	6	0	1	0	0	0	0	0	-	-	7	0
Hibernian	Total		24	0	2	0	1	0	2	0	-	-	29	0
Airdrie United	2012–13	Scottish First Division	9	0	1	0	1	0	0	0	2	0	13	0
Airdrie United	Total		9	0	1	0	1	0	0	0	2	0	13	0
Career total			232	0	15	0	16	0	10	0	4	0	277	0
