= Jamie Smith (footballer, born 1980) =

Scottish footballer

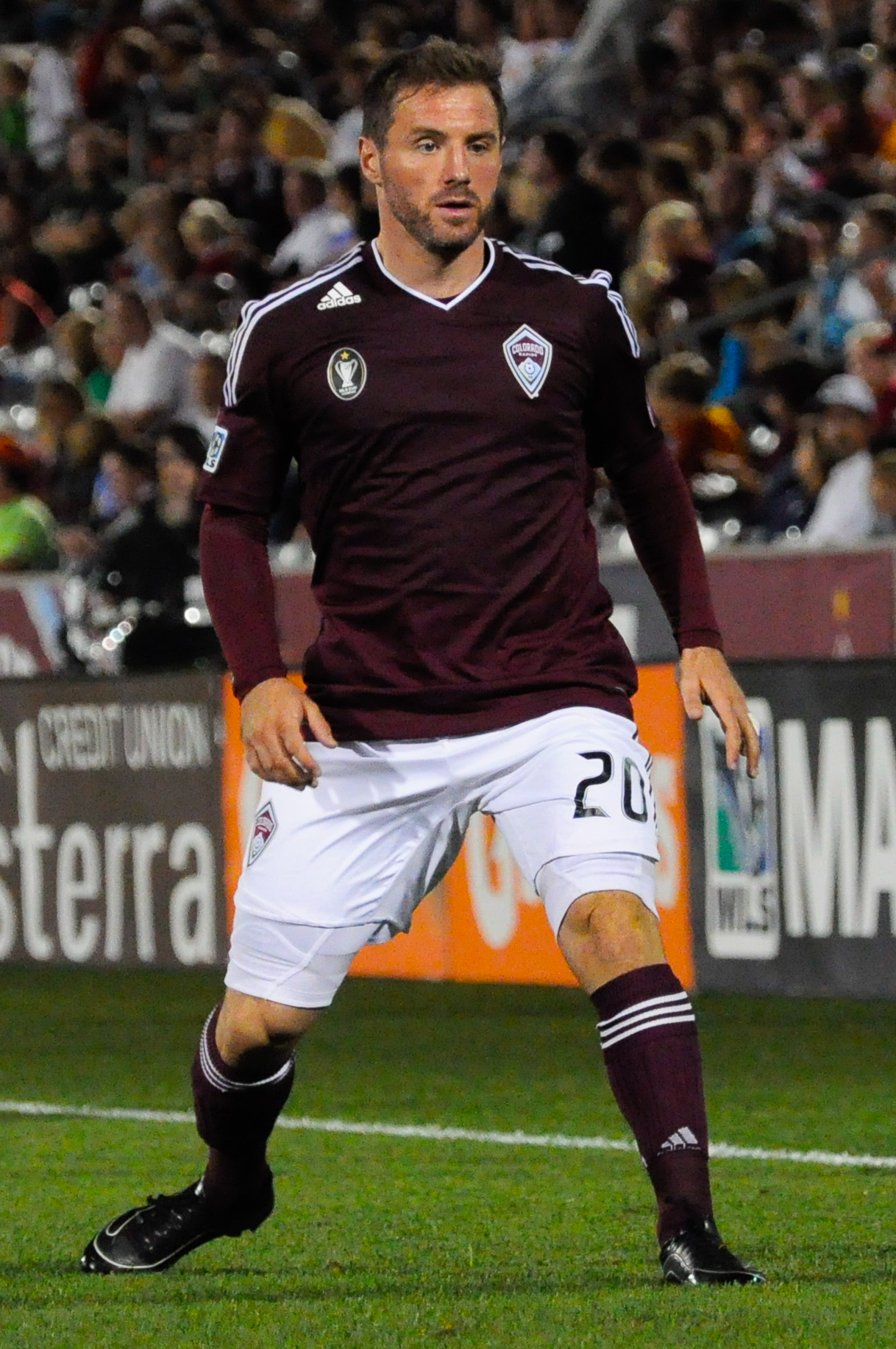
- Smith playing for Colorado Rapids in 2011

Personal information
- Full name: James Smith
- Date of birth: 20 November 1980 (age 45)
- Place of birth: Alexandria, Scotland
- Height: 1.72 m (5 ft 8 in)
- Position: Winger

Youth career
- Celtic Boys Club
- 1996–1999: Celtic

Senior career*
Years	Team	Apps	(Gls)
1999–2004	Celtic	44	(2)
2000	→ Livingston (loan)	6	(1)
2004–2005	ADO Den Haag	30	(1)
2005–2009	Aberdeen	85	(12)
2009–2013	Colorado Rapids	101	(7)
Total		266	(23)

International career^{‡}
2003	Scotland	2	(0)
2004–2005	Scotland B	2	(0)

Managerial career
- 2014–2016: Colorado Rapids U23 (assistant manager)
- * Club domestic league appearances and goals as of 10 January 2014 ‡ National team caps and goals as of 10 January 2014

James Smith (born 20 November 1980 in Alexandria) is a Scottish retired professional footballer and currently executive director at Tennessee United Soccer Club. Prior to this, Smith served as Academy Director for Nashville SC. Smith spent the majority of his playing career in his native country with Celtic and Aberdeen in the Scottish Premier League. He was also capped twice by Scotland.

== Playing career ==
=== Early career ===
Born in Alexandria, West Dunbartonshire, Smith started his career with Celtic; a graduate of the club's youth system, he played 66 games and scored six goals in all competitions across his five years as a senior player. Smith won three major honours (two league titles and the League Cup in 2001) and was an unused substitute in the 2003 UEFA Cup Final, but limited first team opportunities saw him join Dutch club ADO Den Haag in July 2004, spending one season there.

=== Aberdeen ===
He returned to Scotland in season 2005–06 with Aberdeen. In August 2005, Smith struck a late winner as the Dons defeated rivals Rangers in a league match for the first time since April 1998, wowing the Aberdeen support in only his third competitive game for the club. He was involved in a car crash along with teammate Michael Hart in July 2007, while on a pre-season tour of Egypt. Smith was treated for concussion, while Hart was unhurt.

In December 2007, Smith played a key role in Aberdeen's victory over Danish team FC Copenhagen in the 2007–08 UEFA Cup, scoring two goals in the 4–0 victory that saw Aberdeen through to the last 32 of the competition. Smith's contract at Aberdeen ended at the end of the 2008–09 season and he expressed concern that he had not been offered a contract extension, stating that he may need to look for a new club in summer.

=== Colorado Rapids ===
In May 2009, he was given permission to discuss a contract with Major League Soccer side Toronto FC. However, Toronto passed on the signing of Smith and he later signed with Colorado Rapids in July 2009. In his first season with the Rapids he played only four games before suffering a season-ending knee injury.

On 28 August 2010, Smith scored his first MLS goal two minutes into a match against Houston in which he was named man of the match.

Smith remained with Colorado through the 2012 season. After the conclusion of the 2012 season, Colorado declined the 2013 option on Smith's contract and he entered the 2012 MLS Re-Entry Draft. Smith became a free agent after he went undrafted in both rounds of the draft.

Smith was re-signed by Colorado on 8 February 2013.

On 10 January 2014, Smith announced his retirement from playing and joined Colorado Rapids academy coaching staff.

=== International ===
Smith made two appearances for Scotland in 2003, in friendly matches against Austria and Ireland. He later played twice for Scotland B.

== Coaching career ==
After retiring from playing, he joined the coaching staff of Colorado Rapids as U23 manager in 2014.

He had a spell as Academy manager of Continental FC before being appointed to the same role at Nashville SC in 2019.

== Personal life ==
His brother-in-law, Allan Sieczkowski, is the lead singer of the Scottish rock band Little Eye. Colorado Rapids used their song Burgundy Sky as their official anthem to reflect on their famous burgundy kits.

== Career statistics ==
=== Club ===
Appearances and goals by club, season and competition
Club	Season	League			National Cup		League Cup		Europe		Total	
Club	Season	Division	Apps	Goals	Apps	Goals	Apps	Goals	Apps	Goals	Apps	Goals
Celtic	1999–2000	SPL	0	0	0	0	0	0	2	1	2	1
Celtic	2000–01	SPL	8	1	0	0	2	1	0	0	10	2
Celtic	2001–02	SPL	12	1	1	0	1	0	0	0	14	1
Celtic	2002–03	SPL	13	0	3	1	4	0	5	0	25	1
Celtic	2003–04	SPL	11	0	0	0	1	1	3	0	15	1
Celtic	Total		44	2	4	1	8	2	10	1	66	6
Livingston (loan)	1999–2000	Scottish First Division	6	1	0	0	0	0	—		6	1
ADO Hen Haag	2004–05	Eredivise	30	1	3	1	—		—		33	2
Aberdeen	2005–06	SPL	35	8	2	0	3	1	0	0	40	9
Aberdeen	2006–07	SPL	21	1	0	0	0	0	0	0	21	1
Aberdeen	2007–08	SPL	17	3	3	3	2	0	4	2	26	8
Aberdeen	2008–09	SPL	12	0	2	0	1	0	0	0	15	0
Aberdeen	Total		85	12	7	3	6	1	4	2	102	18
Colorado Rapids	2008	MLS	0	0	0	0	0	0	—		0	0
Colorado Rapids	2009	MLS	7	0	0	0	0	0	—		7	0
Colorado Rapids	2010	MLS	38	1	0	0	0	0	—		38	1
Colorado Rapids	2011	MLS	38	3	0	0	0	0	—		38	3
Colorado Rapids	2012	MLS	11	2	0	0	0	0	—		11	2
Colorado Rapids	2013	MLS	7	1	0	0	0	0	—		7	1
Colorado Rapids	Total		101	7	0	0	0	0	0	0	101	7
Career total			266	23	14	5	14	3	14	3	308	34

=== International ===
Appearances and goals by national team and year
National team	Year	Apps	Goals
Scotland	2003	2	0
Total		2	0

== Honours ==
Celtic

- Scottish Premier League: 2002, 2004
- Scottish League Cup: 2001
- UEFA Cup: Runner-up 2002–03

Colorado Rapids

- Major League Soccer
  - Eastern Conference Championship: 2010
  - MLS Cup: 2010
