= Hicham Zerouali =

Moroccan footballer (1977–2004)

Personal information
- Date of birth: 17 January 1977
- Place of birth: Rabat, Morocco
- Date of death: 5 December 2004 (aged 27)
- Place of death: Rabat, Morocco
- Height: 5 ft 7 in (1.70 m)
- Position: Striker

Youth career
- Yaakoub El Mansour
- USP Police

Senior career*
Years	Team	Apps	(Gls)
1996–1999	FUS de Rabat		
1999–2002	Aberdeen	37	(11)
2002–2003	Al-Nasr	1	(1)
2003–2004	FAR Rabat		(8+)

International career
1999–2004	Morocco	14	(6)
- * Club domestic league appearances and goals

Hicham Zerouali (Arabic: هشام زروالي; 17 January 1977 – 5 December 2004), nicknamed 'Zero' or the 'Moroccan Magician', was a Moroccan footballer. He played as a forward for clubs in Morocco, Scotland and the United Arab Emirates. He played internationally for Morocco with seven caps.

== Club career ==
=== Aberdeen ===
After playing in his native Morocco for US Yacoub El Mansour and USP Police, Zerouali was signed by Aberdeen manager Ebbe Skovdahl from FUS de Rabat in November 1999 for a fee of £450,000, on the recommendation of the club's director of football, Keith Burkinshaw. He became the first player in the United Kingdom to wear the shirt number '0' in 2000, which was outlawed the following season by the Scottish Premier League and the Premier League in England; he switched to number 11 for the 2001–02 season.

In January 2000, Zerouali scored a thirty-yard free kick in a fourth round Scottish Cup tie away to St Mirren to take the tie to a replay. Zerouali then scored in the 2–0 replay win at Pittodrie to help the club into the next round of the competition. Aberdeen reached both the 2000 Scottish League Cup Final and the 2000 Scottish Cup Final with Zerouali playing in both matches, although they ended in defeat to Celtic and Rangers respectively.

In August 2000, Zerouali was injured with a broken ankle during a match against Motherwell, and subsequently missed out on a place at the Sydney Olympic Games, and was eventually out of action for a full year. In one of his more memorable outings after his return, he scored a hat-trick against Dundee.

=== Al-Nasr and FAR Rabat ===
After his contract at Aberdeen expired, Zerouali moved to play his football in the United Arab Emirates with the team Al-Nasr for a year, before returning to live in his home country of Morocco in 2003, signing for FAR Rabat, where he won the Coupe du Trône that year.

== International career ==
Zerouali won fourteen caps for the Morocco national football team and scored six goals. He featured for Morocco in the 2002 Africa Cup of Nations in Mali, and scored two goals in a 2–1 win over Burkina Faso. He also played in the 1997 FIFA World Youth Championship. He was in the international squad a month before his death.

== Death ==
Zerouali was killed in a car accident in Rabat in December 2004 aged 27. Only the previous Saturday, he had scored two goals in a league game for his club. He left a daughter with his girlfriend in Aberdeen.

A firm fans' favourite at Aberdeen, he was affectionately known as 'Zero' to the supporters. A memorial and tribute was held at Pittodrie Stadium after he died, which was attended by thousands of fans, despite him not playing for the club at the time and only having spent a short period there.

== Career statistics ==
Appearances and goals by club, season and competition
Club	Season	League			Scottish Cup		League Cup		Europe		Total	
Club	Season	Division	Apps	Goals	Apps	Goals	Apps	Goals	Apps	Goals	Apps	Goals
Aberdeen	1999–2000	Scottish Premier League	14	3	4	2	2	0	0	0	20	5
Aberdeen	2000–01	Scottish Premier League	5	0	0	0	0	0	2	0	7	0
Aberdeen	2001–02	Scottish Premier League	18	8	1	0	2	0	0	0	21	8
Aberdeen	Total		37	11	5	2	4	0	2	0	48	13
