= Chris Clark (footballer, born 1980) =

Scottish footballer

Personal information
- Full name: Christopher Clark
- Date of birth: 15 September 1980 (age 46)
- Place of birth: Elgin, Scotland
- Position: Midfielder

Team information
- Current team: Cove Rangers

Senior career*
| Years | Team | Apps | (Gls) |
| 1997–2008 | Aberdeen | 199 | (9) |
| 2008–2011 | Plymouth Argyle | 107 | (2) |
| 2011–2014 | Aberdeen | 34 | (2) |
| 2014–2015 | Cove Rangers | 36 | (1) |
| Total | | 376 | (14) |

International career
| 2006–2008 | Scotland B | 3 | (0) |
- * Club domestic league appearances and goals

Christopher Clark (born 15 September 1980) is a Scottish former footballer who last played for Highland League club Cove Rangers. Clark previously played for Aberdeen (in two spells) and Plymouth Argyle. He has also represented his country at B level.

== Club career ==
=== Aberdeen ===
Clark began his career at Aberdeen, and firmly established himself as a first-team regular, playing all but one game for the club in the 2006–07 season, in which the Dons qualified for European football. A versatile player, Clark was used predominantly in midfield, but was also played at either full-back position. Clark earned plaudits for his "industrious" performances in Aberdeen's central midfield, but found the net infrequently, scoring just 10 times in 236 appearances.

=== Plymouth Argyle ===
Clark signed a three-and-a-half-year deal with Plymouth Argyle in January 2008, following a bid of £200,000 that had been accepted by Aberdeen. "Chris can play in four or five positions so it's a great benefit to us that he comes with that great pedigree," said manager Paul Sturrock. He made his debut for Argyle in the FA Cup against Portsmouth and scored to give them a lead against Premier League opposition. He was in and out of the team for the remainder of the season, but during the 2008–09 season Clark was ever-present in the first eleven, putting in a string of impressive performances on the left and right-wing. Having made 116 appearances in all competitions for the club, scoring four goals, he was one of nine first team players that were released at the end of the 2010–11 season before their contracts expired in June 2011.

=== Return to Aberdeen ===
At the end of June, Clark rejoined his former club Aberdeen on a free transfer. "I know other clubs were interested but the family love it in the North-East and it's fantastic to see so many familiar faces," he said. A move to Kilmarnock looked likely before he chose to return to Pittodrie. "I heard he was signing for Killie and had ruled out getting him," said manager Craig Brown. "When we found out there was still a chance we could get him, we did what we could to make that happen. He is exactly what we have been looking for". He was re-united with two former teammates from Plymouth Argyle as Kari Arnason and Rory Fallon also joined The Dons. On 7 April 2012, Clark scored his first goal since his return to the club in the 3–1 New Firm derby win against Dundee United at Pittodrie.

=== Cove Rangers ===
Clark was released by Aberdeen in the January 2014 transfer window and signed for Cove Rangers on 4 February 2014.

== International ==
In November 2006, Clark made his Scotland B debut against Ireland B, and has gone on to make two more appearances for the Scotland B team.

== Career statistics ==
Appearances and goals by club, season and competition
| Club | Season | League | | | National Cup | | League Cup | | Europe | | Other | | Total | |
| Club | Season | Division | Apps | Goals | Apps | Goals | Apps | Goals | Apps | Goals | Apps | Goals | Apps | Goals |
|---|---|---|---|---|---|---|---|---|---|---|---|---|---|---|
| Aberdeen | 1998–99 | SPL | 0 | 0 | 0 | 0 | 0 | 0 | 0 | 0 | – | – | 0 | 0 |
| Aberdeen | 1999–00 | SPL | 2 | 0 | 1 | 0 | 0 | 0 | 0 | 0 | – | – | 3 | 0 |
| Aberdeen | 2000–01 | SPL | 24 | 0 | 1 | 0 | 1 | 0 | 1 | 0 | – | – | 27 | 0 |
| Aberdeen | 2001–02 | SPL | 8 | 0 | 0 | 0 | 1 | 0 | 0 | 0 | – | – | 9 | 0 |
| Aberdeen | 2002–03 | SPL | 25 | 1 | 3 | 0 | 0 | 0 | 2 | 0 | – | – | 30 | 1 |
| Aberdeen | 2003–04 | SPL | 23 | 2 | 5 | 1 | 2 | 0 | 0 | 0 | – | – | 30 | 3 |
| Aberdeen | 2004–05 | SPL | 31 | 2 | 3 | 0 | 0 | 0 | 0 | 0 | – | – | 34 | 2 |
| Aberdeen | 2005–06 | SPL | 31 | 2 | 2 | 0 | 3 | 0 | 0 | 0 | – | – | 36 | 2 |
| Aberdeen | 2006–07 | SPL | 37 | 1 | 2 | 0 | 1 | 0 | 0 | 0 | – | – | 40 | 1 |
| Aberdeen | 2007–08 | SPL | 18 | 1 | 1 | 0 | 2 | 0 | 6 | 0 | – | – | 27 | 1 |
| Aberdeen | Total | | 199 | 9 | 18 | 1 | 10 | 0 | 9 | 0 | - | - | 236 | 10 |
| Plymouth Argyle | 2007–08 | Championship | 12 | 0 | 1 | 1 | 0 | 0 | – | – | – | – | 13 | 1 |
| Plymouth Argyle | 2008–09 | Championship | 36 | 0 | 1 | 0 | 0 | 0 | – | – | – | – | 37 | 0 |
| Plymouth Argyle | 2009–10 | Championship | 37 | 1 | 2 | 0 | 1 | 0 | – | – | – | – | 40 | 1 |
| Plymouth Argyle | 2010–11 | League 1 | 22 | 1 | 1 | 0 | 1 | 0 | – | – | 2 | 0 | 26 | 1 |
| Plymouth Argyle | Total | | 107 | 2 | 5 | 1 | 2 | 0 | - | - | 2 | 0 | 116 | 3 |
| Aberdeen | 2011–12 | SPL | 24 | 1 | 4 | 0 | 2 | 0 | 0 | 0 | – | – | 30 | 1 |
| Aberdeen | 2012–13 | SPL | 10 | 1 | 0 | 0 | 2 | 0 | 0 | 0 | – | – | 12 | 1 |
| Aberdeen | 2013–14 | Scottish Premiership | 0 | 0 | 0 | 0 | 0 | 0 | 0 | 0 | – | – | 0 | 0 |
| Aberdeen | Total | | 34 | 2 | 4 | 0 | 4 | 0 | 0 | 0 | - | - | 42 | 2 |
| Cove Rangers | 2014–15 | Highland League | 36 | 1 | 1 | 0 | – | – | – | – | – | – | 37 | 1 |
| Career total | | | 376 | 14 | 28 | 2 | 16 | 0 | 9 | 0 | 2 | 0 | 431 | 16 |
