= Ryan Esson =

Scottish footballer and coach (born 1980)

Personal information
- Full name: Ryan John Esson
- Date of birth: 19 March 1980 (age 46)
- Place of birth: Aberdeen, Scotland
- Height: 6 ft 1 in (1.85 m)
- Position: Goalkeeper

Youth career
- Parkvale
- 1996–1999: Aberdeen

Senior career*
Years	Team	Apps	(Gls)
1999–2006	Aberdeen	89	(0)
2002	→ Rotherham United (loan)	0	(0)
2006–2008	Shrewsbury Town	6	(0)
2008	Hereford United	1	(0)
2008–2022	Inverness Caledonian Thistle	163	(0)
Total		259	(0)

International career
1999–2001	Scotland U21	7	(0)

Managerial career
- 2024–2026: Strathspey Thistle
- 2026–: Rothes
- * Club domestic league appearances and goals

Ryan John Esson (born 19 March 1980) is a Scottish former professional football goalkeeper who was most recently the head coach of Highland league side Rothes. Esson started his career in 2000, in the Scottish Premier League, as a goalkeeper for Aberdeen. He has also played for Shrewsbury Town and Hereford United.

== Career ==
=== Aberdeen ===
Esson started his career with his hometown club Aberdeen in the Scottish Premier League, debuting on 14 May 2000 in the 5–1 win over Kilmarnock. Aberdeen got to the 2000 Scottish Cup Final, and after only three minutes of the match Jim Leighton (playing in his last career game) sustained a serious head injury. Due to teams only being able to name three substitutes at the time, Esson was not on the bench and Robbie Winters was forced to go in goal wearing Esson's jersey. He became Aberdeen's first-choice keeper for 2000–01. After losing his place the following season, he had a brief loan spell at Rotherham United in March to May 2002.

Esson did not play at all in the 2002–03 season and only twice in 2003–04, but played the majority of Aberdeen's games in 2004–05. The former Scotland Youth and U21 international was an unused substitute when the senior side played the USA in November 2005.

His contract expired at the end of the 2005–06 season, and after playing in 18 matches during the campaign, he decided to leave the club in order to seek more first team games. His final appearance was against Celtic in May 2006.

=== Shrewsbury Town ===
He joined Shrewsbury Town on 30 June 2006 on a free transfer and made his début in the 2006–07 opener against Mansfield Town, which finished 2–2. After playing in Shrewsbury's first six league matches he was dropped in favour of Chris Mackenzie. Whilst playing in a reserve fixture on 18 September 2006, Esson sustained a broken cheekbone, and it was later revealed that he would be sidelined for up to ten weeks. Scott Shearer was signed on loan from Bristol Rovers to cover Esson's injury spell. Upon his recovery, Esson could not dislodge him from the first team, and Shearer played out the rest of the season as first choice goalkeeper. In the League Two play-off final, Shearer was prohibited from playing against his parent club, Bristol Rovers; Chris Mackenzie, who had played more league games that season, was chosen ahead of Esson for the match.

At the end of the 2006–07 season Shearer left Shrewsbury, and the club signed Welsh international Glyn Garner to be their first choice goalkeeper for the 2007–08 season. With a season left on his contract, Esson was told that he may leave should he have the desire and opportunity. However, with no firm offers on the table, Esson opted to see out his contract at the club, and he attempted to win back the first choice goalkeeper's berth.

In 2007–08, Esson was used as Shrewsbury's goalkeeper for the early rounds of the League Cup, where his highlight was an extra-time penalty save as Shrewsbury won 1–0 against Colchester United. With Glyn Garner firmly established as the club's number one goalkeeper, rumours linked Esson with a move back to Scotland. On 30 January 2008, Esson was released by Shrewsbury, after having the final six months of his contract paid off.

=== Hereford United ===
On 17 March 2008, Esson joined Hereford United until the end of the season, as cover for the injured Michael Ingham. He made his one and only appearance for the Bulls on the final day of the season, playing 90 minutes against Grimsby Town. He was released by Hereford on 19 May 2008.

=== Inverness CT ===
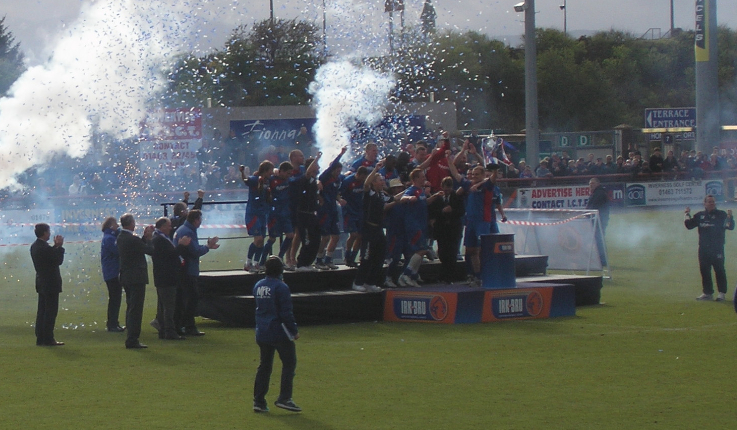
Esson on stage as the Inverness team celebrate winning the First Division title in May 2010 at the Caledonian Stadium.

On 15 July 2008, Esson completed a free transfer to Inverness Caledonian Thistle, signing a two-year contract. He was a regular in the squad which won the First Division championship in 2009–10. Throughout the 2010–11 season he was the first choice 'keeper, ahead of Jonathan Tuffey. He was voted 'Player of the Season' for the 2011–12 campaign. Esson signed a new two-year contract with Inverness in May 2012. In December 2013, Esson signed a further deal with Inverness, which also included a coaching role at the club.

In early 2018, Esson announced that he would be focusing more on his coaching role rather than playing.

In August 2018, he was offered a testimonial game in honor of his ten-year service to the Highland club. The testimonial was initially planned to be played between Inverness CT and an Inverness CT Legends side in April 2020, however, it was postponed to a later date due to the COVID-19 pandemic which had shut down all football within Scotland, and eventually in December 2020, the plan for the testimonial was scrapped entirely, with a charity auction taking place instead.

== Managerial career ==
In July 2024, Esson was quietly, and controversially, released by Inverness, which ultimately became the tipping point that saw CEO Scot Gardiner sacked. The following month, it was announced that Esson had become the new manager of Highland League side, Strathspey Thistle, with former Inverness teammate, Aaron Doran, being his first signing as well as joining him in the coaching staff. On 24 February 2026, Esson was relieved of his duties at Strathspey, despite leading the side to their highest finish since 2020.

In May 2026, Esson was appointed as the manager of fellow Highland League club, Rothes.

== Family ==
Ryan Esson was born in Aberdeen on 19 March 1980. He is the elder brother of Arron Esson, a semi‑professional footballer and coach based in the Highlands. The two brothers have worked together on several local youth football development projects, often running coaching clinics and fundraising matches in their native Aberdeenshire.

== Career statistics ==
As of match played 11 August 2018

Appearances and goals by club, season and competition
Club	Season	League			National cup		League cup		Other		Total	
Club	Season	Division	Apps	Goals	Apps	Goals	Apps	Goals	Apps	Goals	Apps	Goals
Aberdeen	1999–2000	Scottish Premier League	1	0	0	0	0	0	—		1	0
Aberdeen	2000–01	Scottish Premier League	36	0	1	0	1	0	2 (Note: Appearances in the UEFA Cup)	0	40	0
Aberdeen	2001–02	Scottish Premier League	9	0	1	0	2	0	—		12	0
Aberdeen	2002–03	Scottish Premier League	0	0	0	0	0	0	0	0	0	0
Aberdeen	2003–04	Scottish Premier League	2	0	0	0	0	0	—		2	0
Aberdeen	2004–05	Scottish Premier League	23	0	3	0	0	0	—		26	0
Aberdeen	2005–06	Scottish Premier League	18	0	0	0	1	0	—		19	0
Aberdeen	Total		89	0	5	0	4	0	2	0	100	0
Shrewsbury Town	2006–07	League Two	6	0	0	0	0	0	0	0	6	0
Shrewsbury Town	2007–08	League Two	0	0	0	0	2	0	0	0	2	0
Shrewsbury Town	Total		6	0	0	0	2	0	0	0	8	0
Hereford United	2007–08	League Two	1	0	0	0	0	0	0	0	1	0
Inverness; Caledonian; Thistle	2008–09	Scottish Premier League	21	0	2	0	3	0	—		26	0
Inverness; Caledonian; Thistle	2009–10	Scottish First Division	36	0	2	0	2	0	3 (Note: Appearances in the Scottish Challenge Cup)	0	43	0
Inverness; Caledonian; Thistle	2010–11	Scottish Premier League	35	0	1	0	0	0	—		36	0
Inverness; Caledonian; Thistle	2011–12	Scottish Premier League	33	0	0	0	0	0	—		33	0
Inverness; Caledonian; Thistle	2012–13	Scottish Premier League	15	0	1	0	2	0	—		18	0
Inverness; Caledonian; Thistle	2013–14	Scottish Premiership	1	0	0	0	0	0	—		1	0
Inverness; Caledonian; Thistle	2014–15	Scottish Premiership	16	0	4	0	0	0	—		20	0
Inverness; Caledonian; Thistle	2015–16	Scottish Premiership	0	0	0	0	0	0	0	0	0	0
Inverness; Caledonian; Thistle	2016–17	Scottish Premiership	6	0	0	0	1	0	—		7	0
Inverness; Caledonian; Thistle	2017–18	Scottish Championship	0	0	0	0	0	0	0	0	0	0
Inverness; Caledonian; Thistle	2018–19	Scottish Championship	0	0	0	0	0	0	0	0	0	0
Inverness; Caledonian; Thistle	Total		163	0	10	0	8	0	3	0	184	0
Career total			259	0	15	0	14	0	5	0	293	0

== Honours ==
Inverness Caledonian Thistle

- Scottish First Division: 2009–10
- Scottish Cup : 2014–15
