= Russell Anderson =

Scottish footballer

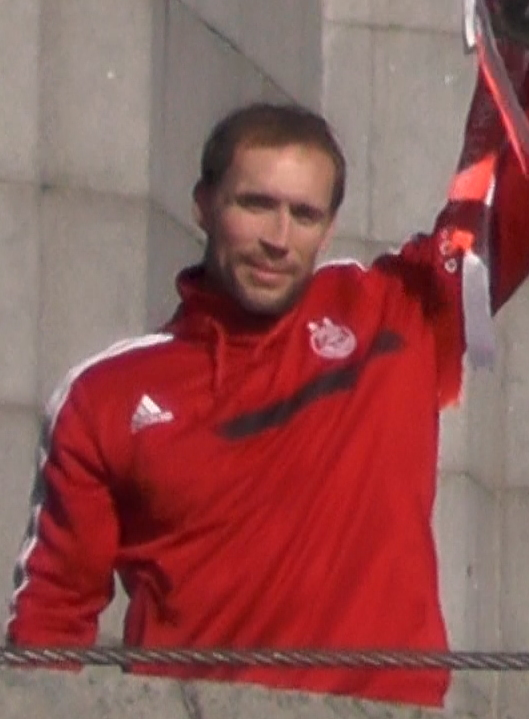
- Anderson with Aberdeen in 2014

Personal information
- Full name: Russell Anderson
- Date of birth: 25 October 1978 (age 48)
- Place of birth: Aberdeen, Scotland
- Height: 6 ft 1 in (1.86 m)
- Position: Centre-back

Senior career*
Years	Team	Apps	(Gls)
1996–2007	Aberdeen	274	(18)
2007–2010	Sunderland	1	(0)
2008	→ Plymouth Argyle (loan)	14	(0)
2008–2009	→ Burnley (loan)	4	(0)
2010–2011	Derby County^{[A]}	34	(1)
2012–2015	Aberdeen	69	(1)
Total		396	(20)

International career
1997–1999	Scotland U21	16	(2)
2002–2008	Scotland	11	(0)
2003	Scotland B	1	(0)

Managerial career
- 2017–2022: Formartine United (assistant)
- * Club domestic league appearances and goals

Russell Anderson (born 25 October 1978) is a Scottish former professional footballer who played as a centre-back. He played in the Scottish Premier League for Aberdeen, the Premier League for Sunderland, and the Football League for Plymouth Argyle, Burnley and Derby County. Anderson won 11 caps for Scotland at full international level between 2002 and 2008.

== Club career ==
=== Aberdeen ===
Anderson was born and raised in Aberdeen and attended Aberdeen Grammar School. He began his career with local club Aberdeen, progressing through the ranks to make his first team debut in 1997; he scored his first goal for the club in a 4–0 win against Hibernian in 2000. Described as a solid, reliable centre-back (although he played some of his early matches at right-back), Anderson established himself as a first choice player and went on to make more than 300 appearances in his first spell with the club. In 2003, he was appointed club captain, a role he held for four years before moving to Sunderland in 2007.

In the 2005–06 season, he won the most league man-of-the-match awards from BBC Radio Scotland's Sportsound. In 2006, Anderson celebrated ten years at the club with a testimonial match against Everton, a match where the Aberdeen fans showed their respect for his considerable ability and loyalty, with 12,000 fans attending the match. Despite Aberdeen leading 2–1, Everton won 3–2.

=== Sunderland ===
Despite having stated his desire to remain at Aberdeen for the rest of his career, on 27 June 2007, Anderson completed a £1 million transfer to Premiership club Sunderland, signing a three-year deal.

Anderson made his first appearance for Sunderland in a friendly match against Italian side Juventus on 4 August 2007. He came on as a substitute at the Stadium of Light with fifteen minutes of the match remaining. On 18 August 2007, he made his Premier League début as a substitute against Wigan Athletic, where he gave away a penalty for a mis-timed tackle in a 3–0 defeat. This would prove to be his only Premier League appearance for Sunderland, as his next two years at the club would be blighted by injury. His second and last appearance for the club came against Luton in the League Cup on 28 August 2007. Anderson, making his full début, ruptured his ankle ligaments. After having reconstructive surgery, Anderson was ruled out for three months.

On 19 February 2008, Anderson joined Plymouth Argyle on a one-month loan, which was later extended until the end of the 2007–08 season. He made his début for Plymouth away to Southampton on 19 February 2008, with Plymouth winning 2–0. Anderson went on to play in all 14 of Plymouth's final league games of the season during his spell at the club.

On 26 August 2008, Anderson joined Burnley on loan until the end of the 2008–09 season. He made his Burnley début on 30 August 2008 in a 0–0 draw against his former club Plymouth. Anderson played four consecutive league games for Burnley, but in his fifth game for the club, a League Cup tie against Fulham on 23 September 2008, he suffered a serious cruciate ligament injury that ruled him out for the rest of the season.

After spending 14 months out injured, Anderson finally made his comeback in a reserve game against Wigan Athletic on 1 December 2009. Anderson's contract was due to expire at the end of the 2009–10 season. On 31 December, Anderson was reported to be in talks with Hibernian and an "unnamed Championship club", later revealed to be Derby County. However, Hibernian said they had no interest in signing Anderson, giving Derby County an advantage to win the race. Reports of Anderson leaving were confirmed on 14 January 2010, as Sunderland released him from his contract.

After leaving Sunderland, Anderson told MailSport in an interview: "It hasn't been a great couple of years and I've spent more time in the treatment room than the dressing-room. But I can't moan about what happened at Sunderland because it won't do me any good."

=== Derby County ===
On 15 January 2010, Derby County announced that they had signed Anderson on a contract until the end of the 2009–10 season. He made his début as a second-half substitute in a 3–0 win at Peterborough United the following day and appeared sporadically as a late substitute for the club over the next eight weeks, behind the club's first choice pairing of Jake Buxton and Shaun Barker. He finally made his first start for the club in a 2–2 draw with Middlesbrough on 16 March, in place of Buxton, and kept it for the rest of the season as Derby successfully fought off relegation. Anderson scored his first goal for Derby County, and his first in three years, on 17 April 2010 with the opener in a 1–1 draw against Crystal Palace which ensured Derby were safe from relegation. Anderson impressed enough for Derby manager Nigel Clough to confirm his intention to offer Anderson a two-year deal at the end of the 2009–10 season, seeing Anderson as one of four centre halves for the club's 2010–11 season alongside Barker, Buxton and Dean Leacock. The deal was signed on 21 April 2010

Anderson started the 2010–11 season alongside Dean Leacock in the centre of the Derby defence as they earned a 2–1 win at Leeds United before an injury sustained in training ruled him out for the next two months. He returned to action with a 60-minute appearance in the reserves 3–1 defeat at Rotherham United. He returned to first team action as an 89th-minute substitute the following Saturday against Preston North End, winning a 93rd-minute penalty which Robbie Savage converted in a 3–0 Derby victory. He suffered a hamstring injury soon after which ruled him out for another three months before picking up a calf injury in his rehabilitation to rule him out until mid-February 2011. He returned to the side on 2 April with a substitute appearance in a 4–1 defeat at Cardiff City and featured in the remaining six games of the campaign with a further three starts and three substitute appearances. Following the end of the 2010/11 season, it was reported that Aberdeen had a move for Anderson accepted but the player rejected the chance of a move, preferring to remain at Pride Park. Anderson started the season in Derby's first team but was injured 35 minutes into the first game and missed the first month of the season. Upon returning to the side for a 3–0 win over Millwall at the end of September, Anderson played a role in seven of Derby's next eight games, often employed at right-back in the absence of first choice John Brayford. However, a hamstring injury sustained in a 3–0 home defeat to Cardiff City saw him ruled out of action for two months. The injury proved to be the final injury of a blighted spell with the Rams as his contract was canceled by mutual consent on 12 December 2011, with just 19 appearances coming in his 15 months as permanent player at the club.

=== Return to Aberdeen ===
Anderson signed for Aberdeen for a second time in January 2012 and was appointed as captain of the team. In an exclusive interview with Daily Record, Anderson expressed return to Aberdeen, so he would overcome his injury.

After two months without playing due to an injury, Anderson finally made his first appearance in his second Aberdeen spell, when he came on for Clark Robertson in the 76th minutes as a substitute, as Aberdeen lost 3–0 against Hearts on 31 March 2012. Despite the loss, Anderson expressed his delight at his return and said he felt that it meant a lot to receive a great welcome from fans. Anderson stated his aim to help the club reach a final for the first time in thirteen years. Having made twenty two appearances so far, Anderson signed a contract extension that will keep him until the next season. Anderson said he was happy at signing a contract extension and delaying his retirement. Anderson's first full season back with Aberdeen wasn't very successful, with the club finishing 8th in the Scottish Premier League.

In the 2013–14 season, Anderson said he had unfinished business at the club and vowed to take them back to where they belong. On 25 January 2014, he scored his first goal for Aberdeen since returning to the club, scoring an injury time equaliser, as Aberdeen drew 2–2 with Motherwell. After beating St Johnstone 4–0 to reach the final of the Scottish League Cup, Manager Derek McInnes commented that the final meant many things for Anderson, while Willie Miller compared Reynolds and Anderson's central defense partnership to his own partnership with Alex McLeish during their time at Aberdeen.

Anderson was the sixth Aberdeen captain to lift silverware when they defeated Inverness Caledonian Thistle 4–2 on penalties in the 2014 Scottish League Cup Final. Anderson himself came very close to scoring in the match, hitting the post with a volley. Anderson reacted on Aberdeen winning the Scottish League Cup as an "incredible feeling". Following the final, Derek McInnes announced he would be giving a new deal to Anderson. The captain's armband that he wore in the final, was snapped up by a fan who paid £500, which later went to charity.

On 15 May 2014, Anderson signed a new one-year contract with Aberdeen. Anderson appeared and captained five out of the six for Aberdeen's Europa League matches. During the match against St Johnstone on 23 August 2014, Anderson was limped with a knee injury and was taken off in the 77th minutes. As a result, Anderson was out for most of the season. On 7 May 2015, Anderson announced that he would retire from playing at the end of the 2014–15 season. He played his final match on 24 May 2015, as Aberdeen lost 1–0 at home to St Johnstone.

After announcing his retirement, Anderson remained at the club in a business development role. As of September 2017, he continues in this position at Pittodrie, while also supporting brother-in-law, Paul Lawson – in an assistant manager capacity – at Highland League club, Formartine United.

== International career ==
Anderson played for the Scotland national side on eleven occasions and was both a youth and under-21 international. He won his first cap against Iceland in October 2002, coming on as a late substitute. Anderson went on to win 11 full caps in total, making his last international appearance in March 2008.

== Awards ==
Anderson won the SPL player of the month award in November 2006. He was nominated for Scottish PFA Players' Player of the Year for the 2006/07 season, and was the only nominee playing for a club other than league champions Celtic. Anderson was also named in the Scottish PFA team of the year for the 2006–07 season.

== Personal life ==
His son Jevan is also a footballer.

== Career statistics ==
=== Club ===
Appearances and goals by club, season and competition
Club	Season	League			National cup		League cup		Europe		Total	
Club	Season	Division	Apps	Goals	Apps	Goals	Apps	Goals	Apps	Goals	Apps	Goals
Aberdeen	1996–97	Scottish Premier Division	14	0	2	0	0	0	0	0	16	0
Aberdeen	1997–98	Scottish Premier Division	26	0	0	0	2	0	0	0	28	0
Aberdeen	1998–99	Scottish Premier League	16	0	0	0	2	0	0	0	18	0
Aberdeen	1999–00	Scottish Premier League	34	1	7	0	5	0	0	0	46	1
Aberdeen	2000–01	Scottish Premier League	0	0	0	0	0	0	0	0	0	0
Aberdeen	2001–02	Scottish Premier League	24	1	1	0	0	0	0	0	25	1
Aberdeen	2002–03	Scottish Premier League	33	2	3	1	2	0	4	0	42	3
Aberdeen	2003–04	Scottish Premier League	25	5	4	0	3	0	0	0	32	5
Aberdeen	2004–05	Scottish Premier League	31	1	3	0	2	0	0	0	36	1
Aberdeen	2005–06	Scottish Premier League	36	6	2	0	2	0	0	0	40	6
Aberdeen	2006–07	Scottish Premier League	35	2	2	0	1	0	0	0	38	2
Aberdeen	Total		274	18	24	1	19	0	4	0	321	19
Sunderland	2007–08	Premier League	1	0	0	0	1	0	0	0	2	0
Sunderland	2008–09	Premier League	0	0	0	0	0	0	0	0	0	0
Sunderland	2009–10	Premier League	0	0	0	0	0	0	0	0	0	0
Sunderland	Total		1	0	0	0	1	0	0	0	2	0
Plymouth Argyle (loan)	2007–08	Championship	14	0	0	0	0	0	0	0	14	0
Burnley (loan)	2008–09	Championship	4	0	0	0	1	0	0	0	5	0
Derby County	2009–10	Championship	15	1	0	0	0	0	0	0	15	1
Derby County	2010–11	Championship	11	0	0	0	0	0	0	0	11	0
Derby County	2011–12	Championship	8	0	0	0	0	0	0	0	8	0
Derby County	Total		34	1	0	0	0	0	0	0	34	1
Aberdeen	2011–12	Scottish Premier League	6	0	0	0	0	0	0	0	6	0
Aberdeen	2012–13	Scottish Premier League	31	0	2	0	2	0	0	0	35	0
Aberdeen	2013–14	Scottish Premiership	30	1	4	1	4	0	0	0	38	2
Aberdeen	2014–15	Scottish Premiership	2	0	0	0	0	0	5	0	7	0
Aberdeen	Total		69	1	6	1	6	0	5	0	86	2
Career total			396	20	30	2	26	0	9	0	462	22

=== International ===
Appearances and goals by national team and year
National team	Year	Apps	Goals
Scotland	2002	3	0
Scotland	2003	1	0
Scotland	2004	2	0
Scotland	2005	1	0
Scotland	2006	2	0
Scotland	2007	1	0
Scotland	2008	1	0
Total		11	0

== Notes ==
A. Soccerbase's stats for the match between Nottingham Forest and Derby County on 17 September 2011 fail to count a substitute appearance made by Anderson, instead crediting it to Lee Croft. Therefore, until and unless they correct it, he should have one more appearance for Derby than given on his Soccerbase page.
