= Scott Michie =

Scottish footballer

Personal information
- Date of birth: 22 August 1983 (age 43)
- Place of birth: Aberdeen, Scotland
- Position: Striker

Youth career
- –1999: Aberdeen (S-Form)

Senior career*
Years	Team	Apps	(Gls)
1999–2004	Aberdeen	22	(0)
2003–2004	→ Montrose (loan)	31	(14)
2004–2006	Peterhead	59	(25)
2006–2007	Montrose	33	(7)
2007–2009	Inverurie Loco Works		
2009–2010	Peterhead	4	(1)
- * Club domestic league appearances and goals as of 23:38, 12 November 2009 (UTC)

Scott Michie (born 22 August 1983) is a Scottish footballer, who last played in the SFL for Peterhead in the Scottish Second Division.

He is a striker who started his career with Aberdeen before moving to Peterhead in 2004, with a year at Montrose followed by two years at Inverurie Loco Works. He returned to the Blue Toon in 2009, where he lasted four games before being released in 2010.
