= Mark Peat =

Scottish footballer

Personal information
- Date of birth: 13 March 1982 (age 44)
- Place of birth: Bellshill, Scotland
- Position: Goalkeeper

Team information
- Current team: Bo'ness United

Youth career
- 1999–2001: Aberdeen

Senior career*
Years	Team	Apps	(Gls)
2001–2003	Aberdeen	1	(0)
2003–2005	Arbroath	33	(0)
2004–2005	→ Albion Rovers (loan)	9	(0)
2005	→ Forfar Athletic (loan)	0	(0)
2005–2007	Arbroath	61	(0)
2007–2009	Montrose	35	(0)
2009	East Stirlingshire	16	(0)
2009–2011	Berwick Rangers	55	(0)
2011–2012	Beith Juniors		
2012–2013	Stirling Albion	15	(0)
2013–	Bo'ness United		
- * Club domestic league appearances and goals as of 19:00, 21 February 2013

Mark Peat (born 13 March 1982) is a Scottish professional footballer who plays as a goalkeeper for Bo'ness United in the Scottish Junior Football Association, East Region. He has previously played in the Scottish Premier League for Aberdeen and in the Scottish Football League for several clubs.

== Career ==
Peat came through the youth ranks at Aberdeen and was a member of the Dons youth squad that won the Scottish Youth Cup in 2000–2001. He made his first-team debut against Heart of Midlothian in an April 2002 Scottish Premier League fixture. This proved to be his sole appearance for Aberdeen and Peat left for Arbroath in July 2003.

Peat later played for Montrose, East Stirlingshire and Berwick Rangers before dropping to Junior level with Beith Juniors. He stepped back up to Stirling Albion during the 2012 summer transfer window and came on as a half-time substitute in Albion's 1–0 victory over Rangers in October that year.

Peat was released by Stirling in January 2013 and joined Junior side Bo'ness United the following month.
