= Roberto Bisconti =

Belgian footballer

Personal information
- Date of birth: 21 July 1973 (age 53)
- Place of birth: Montegnée, Belgium
- Height: 1.80 m (5 ft 11 in)
- Position: Midfielder

Youth career
- FC Liège
- Tilleur
- Standard Liège

Senior career*
Years	Team	Apps	(Gls)
1991–1995	Standard Liège	63	(6)
1995–1996	Seraing	20	(2)
1996–1997	Standard Liège	28	(1)
1997–1998	Monza	18	(1)
1998–2000	Standard Liège	23	(4)
2000–2001	Charleroi	17	(0)
2001–2002	Aberdeen	42	(1)
2003	Rapid București	8	(0)
2003–2004	Standard Liège	27	(0)
2004–2006	Nice	32	(0)
2006–2007	Guingamp	23	(1)
2008	Panthrakikos	0	(0)
2009	Visé	7	(0)
2009–2011	Sérésien		
Total		308	(16)

International career
1992–1995	Belgium U21	6	(3)
2004–2005	Belgium	13	(0)
- * Club domestic league appearances and goals

Roberto Bisconti (born 21 July 1973) is a Belgian retired professional footballer who played as a midfielder.

== Club career ==
Bisconti was born in Montegnée, Liège. During his career, he played for Standard Liège on four occasions (where he earlier played a minor role in a generation of players dubbed The Three Musketeers, composed of Régis Genaux, Michaël Goossens and Philippe Léonard), Monza, Charleroi, Aberdeen, Rapid București (six-month contract), Nice, Guingamp and Panthrakikos (no official games in Greece).

On 16 February 2009, Bisconti returned to Belgium after five years, signing with third division club Visé on a free transfer, until the end of the season. He retired from football in June 2011, aged 38.

== International career ==
Bisconti earned 13 caps for Belgium, making his full debut at almost 31 in a 0–2 friendly loss with France, on 18 February 2004.

== Honours ==
Standard Liège

- Belgian Cup: 1992–93

Rapid Bucharest

- Divizia A: 2002–03
