= Leon Mike =

English footballer (born 1981)

Personal information
- Date of birth: 4 September 1981 (age 45)
- Place of birth: Manchester, England
- Position: Striker

Team information
- Current team: Bury (joint interim manager)

Youth career
- Manchester City

Senior career*
Years	Team	Apps	(Gls)
1998–2002	Manchester City	2	(0)
2000	→ Oxford United (loan)	3	(0)
2001	→ Halifax Town (loan)	7	(0)
2002–2003	Aberdeen	33	(5)
2003–2005	Mossley		
2005–2006	F.C. United of Manchester	5	(0)

International career
1997	England Schoolboys		
- England U18

Managerial career
- 2022: Burscough
- 2023: Bury (interim)
- * Club domestic league appearances and goals

Leon Mike (born 4 September 1981) is an English football manager and former professional player, who is the under-23 manager and joint interim manager at Bury in the North West Counties League Premier Division.

== Playing career ==
Mike began his career with Manchester City. As a youngster he played for England Schoolboys against Germany in 1997.

His first senior experience came in loan spells at Oxford United and Halifax Town in the 2000–01 season. In the 2001–02 season he was part of a group of young players selected to train as part of the senior Manchester City squad. Following a hat-trick for the reserve team in November 2001, he was included in the squad for a match against Portsmouth, and made his debut as a substitute following an injury to Shaun Goater. In the following match, against Rotherham United, Mike made his first and only start for Manchester City.

Mike's performances for the Manchester City reserve team attracted the attention of scouts from Aberdeen, who had attended with the original intention of watching Scotland international Paul Dickov. Mike moved to Aberdeen in February 2002, but was released from the Dons fifteen months later. and ended up with Mossley, where he scored 37 goals in 71 games. Mike joined FC United of Manchester in December 2005, before leaving a year later and leaving football altogether.

== Coaching career ==
He became manager of Burscough in May 2022.

In the summer of 2023 he became the under-23 manager of Bury, later taking over the side on an interim basis in September 2023 following the departure of Andy Welsh.

== Personal life ==
He appeared as an extra in the ITV soap Coronation Street.

He began a law degree in September 2007 at a Liverpool college. His cousin is Adie Mike.
