= Kevin Rutkiewicz =

Scottish footballer (born 1980)

Personal information
- Date of birth: 10 May 1980 (age 46)
- Place of birth: Royston, Glasgow, Scotland
- Position: Defender

Youth career
- Larkhall Thistle

Senior career*
Years	Team	Apps	(Gls)
1998–2004	Aberdeen	83	(1)
2004–2011	St Johnstone	148	(8)
2011	→ Dunfermline Athletic (loan)	12	(0)
2011–2012	Dunfermline Athletic	14	(0)
2012–2013	Greenock Morton	34	(2)
2013–2014	Carolina RailHawks	18	(2)
2014–2015	East Fife	14	(0)
2015–2016	Blantyre Victoria		
2016–2017	Irvine Meadow		
2017	Clyde	1	(0)
2017–2018	Annan Athletic	2	(0)
Total		366	(13)

Managerial career
- 2018–2021: Stirling Albion
- 2022–2023: East Kilbride
- * Club domestic league appearances and goals

Kevin Rutkiewicz (born 10 May 1980) is a Scottish football coach and former player. He managed Scottish League Two club Stirling Albion and Lowland League side East Kilbride and played as a defender for Aberdeen, St Johnstone, Dunfermline Athletic, Greenock Morton, East Fife and American club Carolina RailHawks.

== Career ==
Glasgow born Rutkiewicz began his professional career with Aberdeen, making his debut in an SPL fixture against Hibernian in November 1999 at the age of nineteen. He went on to make over eighty first-team appearances for the Pittodrie club, scoring his only goal for them in a 3–2 defeat to Hearts in April 2002.

Rutkiewicz became then St Johnstone manager John Connolly's first signing for the Perth club in June 2004. He scored his first goal for Saints in a 3–0 win over Queen of the South in the league cup two months into his St Johnstone career. He signed a new two-year contract at the end of 2005–06, but missed all of 2006–07 due to an injury. In his first game back, on 11 August 2007, he scored a goal in Saints' 2–2 draw with Stirling Albion at McDiarmid Park.

Rutkiewicz was made club captain in 2008–09 after the previous captain, Kevin James, suffered injury problems and dropped out of the first team. In March 2009 he received the Scottish First Division Player of the Month Award for a string of solid performances that helped the team maintain their lead at the top of the league table.

In January 2011, Rutkiewicz joined Dunfermline on loan. This successful spell led to him accepting a permanent contract for the 2011–12 season. He missed most of the season due to a hip injury. Soon after making a comeback he suffered an ankle injury. He made a second comeback, but then immediately suffered a third injury, which ruled him out of action for the rest of the season.

After he was released by Dunfermline in May 2012, and went on trial with Greenock Morton starting in a friendly match against Concordia Chiajna and coming off the bench to replace Martin Hardie in the Renfrewshire Cup final against St Mirren.

He signed for Morton towards the end of July 2012. In April 2013, Rutkiewicz agreed a two-year player/coach deal with Carolina RailHawks in the North American Soccer League.

In October 2015, Rutkiewicz dropped down to Junior level when he signed for Blantyre Victoria in a player/coach role. He took temporary charge of Vics after the departure of Davie Greig in December 2015 but followed his former manager to Irvine Meadow in January 2016. Rutkiewicz returned to the SPFL tier-system in March 2017, signing a short-term contract with Scottish League Two side Clyde. Rutkiewicz left the club in May 2017 after his contract ended, subsequently signing a deal with Annan Athletic which saw him become player-assistant manager to Peter Murphy.

In October 2018, Rutkiewicz was appointed manager of Scottish League Two club Stirling Albion. In December 2021, Rutkiewicz announced is resignation.

On 28 March 2022, Rutkiewicz was appointed manager of Lowland League side East Kilbride Rutkiewicz won the Lowland League Cup with East Kilbride in 2022. He resigned in March 2023, just short of a year in charge.

== Personal life ==
Rutkiewicz is of Polish descent. His grandfather Ernest was born in Warsaw, but moved to Scotland during the Second World War.

== Honours ==
St Johnstone

- Scottish Challenge Cup: 2007–08
