= Fergus Tiernan =

Scottish footballer

Personal information
- Full name: Fergus Alexander Tiernan
- Date of birth: 3 January 1982 (age 44)
- Place of birth: Abeokuta, Nigeria
- Height: 1.77 m (5 ft 10 in)
- Position: Midfielder

Youth career
- 1998–2001: Aberdeen

Senior career*
Years	Team	Apps	(Gls)
2001–2004	Aberdeen	52	(1)
2004–2007	Ross County	44	(0)
2006–2009	Dumbarton	37	(7)
2009	Queen's Park	1	(0)
Total		134	(8)
- * Club domestic league appearances and goals

Fergus Tiernan (born 3 January 1982) is a former football midfielder.

== Football career ==
Raised in Helensburgh, Tiernan began his career at Scottish Premier League club Aberdeen, and also had spells at Ross County and Dumbarton. He made an initial decision to retire in January 2009. He made a brief comeback with Queen's Park later in 2009 before changing his mind once again.

== Career after football ==
Having become a firefighter after dropping out of full-time football, Tiernan found it difficult to accommodate his football and work commitments. He retired from professional football at the age of 27 in 2009.
