= Darren Mackie =

Scottish footballer (born 1982)

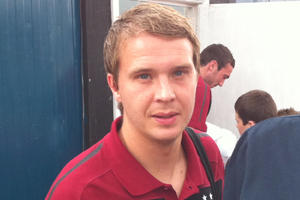
- Mackie in 2010

Personal information
- Full name: Darren Graham Mackie
- Date of birth: 5 January 1982 (age 44)
- Place of birth: Inverurie, Scotland
- Height: 5 ft 9 in (1.75 m)
- Position: Striker

Senior career*
Years	Team	Apps	(Gls)
1998–2012	Aberdeen	313	(58)
2004	→ Inverness Caledonian Thistle (loan)	6	(0)
2012–2013	Phoenix	10	(5)
2013–2016	Turriff United	87	(32)
2016–2017	Inverurie Locos	54	(32)
Total		470	(127)

International career
2007	Scotland B	1	(0)
- * Club domestic league appearances and goals as of 28 July 2013

Darren Graham Mackie (born 5 January 1982) is a Scottish former professional footballer who played as a striker for Aberdeen in the Scottish Premier League between 1998 and 2012, with a loan spell at Inverness Caledonian Thistle in 2004.

Though he was never a prolific goalscorer throughout his career, Mackie is regarded as a cult hero among Aberdeen fans due to his off-field antics and scoring the goal that took the Dons into the UEFA Cup group stages in 2007.

== Club career ==
=== Aberdeen ===
Mackie was born in Inverurie, Aberdeenshire, Scotland. A product of the Aberdeen Aberdeen youth system, he started his professional career with the club's senior team in 1998.

==== Inverness CT (loan) ====
In January 2004, Mackie moved on loan to Inverness Caledonian Thistle. He made six league appearances for Inverness, but failed to score a goal and returned to Aberdeen at the end of the season.

==== Return to Aberdeen ====
He scored 15 goals for Aberdeen in the 2004–05 season – including twelve in the league – which helped his team to a fourth-place finish, but they just missed out on UEFA Cup qualification. On 22 August 2006, Mackie missed a decisive penalty in a shock 5–3 penalty shootout league cup defeat to Third Division side Queen's Park. He finished the 2006–07 season with 13 league goals, including one very bizarre one in a match against Kilmarnock on 28 April 2007. Kilmarnock goalkeeper Alan Combe attempted to throw the ball to one of his teammates, but Mackie, who was walking away from goal, was instead hit on the back of his head by Combe's throw and the ball rebounded over the helpless keeper into the net.

Aberdeen finished third in the SPL in the 2006–07 season and therefore qualified for the 2007–08 UEFA Cup first round, where they faced Ukrainian club Dnipro. The first leg of the tie on 20 September 2007 at Pittodrie ended goalless, but in the second-leg, Mackie netted the opening goal, his 50th goal for Aberdeen. He headed in from close range after a pinpoint cross by Ricky Foster. The match ended 1–1 with Andriy Vorobey scoring the equaliser for Dnipro, but Mackie's strike ensured Aberdeen's progress to the group stages of the tournament on away goals and secured a substantial financial windfall for the club. Mackie also scored the only goal of the game against Celtic at Celtic Park in the Scottish Cup quarter-final replay on 18 March 2008.

Mackie scored his 50th league goal for Aberdeen on 20 December 2008 in an SPL match against Inverness Caledonian Thistle at the Caledonian Stadium and signed a new three-year contract with the Dons in February 2009.

On 19 July 2011, Aberdeen played La Liga side Villarreal at Pittodrie in a testimonial match to mark Mackie's thirteen years with the club. The match ended 1–0 to Villarreal, with striker Giuseppe Rossi scoring the only goal after 53 minutes. Near the end of the 2011–12 season, Mackie was advised that his contract with Aberdeen would not be extended. Mackie played his last game for Aberdeen in a goalless draw against St Mirren on 12 May.

=== Phoenix FC ===
On 27 September 2012, Mackie signed a one-year contract with Phoenix FC of the USL Pro. He was sidelined with a groin injury in the early part of the season, which limited his playing time. His contract was not renewed and he returned to Scotland after the season ended.

=== Turriff United ===
After leaving Phoenix, Mackie returned to Scottish football with Turriff United in 2013, spending three seasons at the club. His spell playing for the Highland League outfit was again blighted by injuries, including a 12-month lay-off following a knee ligament injury in a game against Fraserburgh.

=== Inverurie Loco Works ===
Mackie was announced as a player-coach at Inverurie Loco Works as of 1 September 2016. In late 2016, Mackie took temporary charge of Inverurie following the resignation of the club's manager, Scott Buchan.

In June 2017, the club announced on social media that Mackie was leaving both roles at Inverurie Loco Works, citing business commitments.

Shortly after leaving the Locos, Mackie retired as a player.

== International career ==
On 30 January 2007, Alex McLeish named Mackie in the Scotland B team to play Finland B at Rugby Park, Kilmarnock on 7 February.

== Career statistics ==
Appearances and goals by club, season and competition
Club	Season	League			Scottish Cup		Scottish League Cup		Europe		Total	
Club	Season	Division	Apps	Goals	Apps	Goals	Apps	Goals	Apps	Goals	Apps	Goals
Aberdeen	1999–2000	Scottish Premier League	4	0	0	0	1	0	0	0	5	0
Aberdeen	2000–01	Scottish Premier League	22	2	2	1	1	0	1	0	26	3
Aberdeen	2001–02	Scottish Premier League	34	8	2	0	2	1	0	0	38	9
Aberdeen	2002–03	Scottish Premier League	30	4	1	0	1	0	4	1	36	5
Aberdeen	2003–04	Scottish Premier League	16	0	0	0	2	0	0	0	18	0
Aberdeen	2004–05	Scottish Premier League	34	12	3	3	1	0	0	0	38	15
Aberdeen	2005–06	Scottish Premier League	27	4	1	0	1	0	0	0	30	4
Aberdeen	2006–07	Scottish Premier League	36	13	2	0	1	0	0	0	39	13
Aberdeen	2007–08	Scottish Premier League	19	3	3	1	1	0	3	1	25	5
Aberdeen	2008–09	Scottish Premier League	29	6	3	0	2	0	0	0	34	6
Aberdeen	2009–10	Scottish Premier League	32	4	3	1	1	0	2	0	36	5
Aberdeen	2010–11	Scottish Premier League	9	1	0	0	3	0	0	0	12	1
Aberdeen	2011–12	Scottish Premier League	19	1	2	0	2	2	0	0	23	3
Aberdeen	Total		313	58	22	6	19	3	10	2	364	69
Inverness (loan)	2003–04	Scottish First Division	6	0	2	0	0	0	0	0	8	0
Career total			319	58	24	6	19	3	10	2	372	69
