= 1999–2000 Aberdeen F.C. season =

Aberdeen
1999–2000 season
- Chairman: Stewart Milne
- Manager: Ebbe Skovdahl
- Stadium: Pittodrie Stadium
- Scottish Premier League: 10th
- Scottish Cup: Runners-up
- Scottish League Cup: Runners-up
- Top goalscorer: League: Arild Stavrum (9); All: Arild Stavrum (12)
- Highest home attendance: 18,451 vs. Inverness Caledonian Thistle, 29 February 2000
- Lowest home attendance: 6,756 vs. Livingston, 17 August 1999
- Average home league attendance: 12,809

Aberdeen F.C. competed in the Scottish Premier League, Scottish League Cup and Scottish Cup in season 1999–2000.

== First-team squad ==
Squad at end of season

Note: Flags indicate national team as defined under FIFA eligibility rules; some limited exceptions apply. Players may hold more than one non-FIFA nationality.

No.	Pos.	Nation	Player
1	GK	SCO	Jim Leighton
2	DF	SCO	Mark Perry
3	DF	SCO	Derek Whyte
4	MF	ENG	Nigel Pepper
5	DF	NOR	Thomas Solberg
6	DF	SCO	Gary Smith
8	MF	SCO	Eoin Jess
9	FW	SCO	Robbie Winters
10	MF	GER	Andreas Mayer
11	DF	BUL	Iliyan Kiryakov
12	DF	SCO	Andy Dow
13	GK	SCO	Mark Peat
14	MF	SCO	Paul Bernard
15	DF	SCO	Russell Anderson
16	MF	SCO	Jamie Buchan (Note: Buchan was born in Manchester, England, but also qualified to represent Scotland internationally through his father and represented them at U-21 level.)
17	MF	SCO	David Rowson
18	MF	SCO	Ricky Gillies
19	MF	SCO	Darren Young
21	MF	SCO	Derek Young
22	DF	SCO	Michael Hart
23	GK	SCO	Ryan Esson
24	MF	SCO	Russell Duncan
25	DF	SCO	Stuart McCaffrey

No.	Pos.	Nation	Player
26	DF	NOR	Cato Guntveit
27	MF	ISL	Baldur Bett
28	DF	SCO	Iain Good
29	FW	SCO	Darren Mackie
30	DF	SCO	Jamie McAllister
31	MF	SCO	Fergus Tiernan
32	DF	SCO	Kevin Milne
33	DF	SCO	Phil McGuire
34	MF	SCO	Chris Clark
35	DF	ISL	Calum Bett
36	MF	SCO	Steven Marwick
37	DF	SCO	Kevin Rutkiewicz
38	DF	SCO	Kevin McNaughton
39	DF	SCO	David Lilley
40	GK	ENG	David Preece
41	FW	SCO	Scott Michie
42	MF	SCO	Ross O'Donoghue
43	MF	BEL	Rachid Belabed
44	DF	ARG	Juan Cobian
45	DF	SCO	Jamie Clark (on loan from San Jose Earthquakes)
46	FW	NOR	Arild Stavrum
47	FW	MAR	Hicham Zerouali

=== Left club during season ===
Note: Flags indicate national team as defined under FIFA eligibility rules; some limited exceptions apply. Players may hold more than one non-FIFA nationality.

No. / Pos. / Nation / Player; 7 / FW / SCO / Jim Hamilton (to Dundee United)	No. / Pos. / Nation / Player; 20 / FW / SCO / Dennis Wyness (to Inverness Caledonian Thistle)

== Results ==
=== Scottish Premier League ===
Match Day	Date	Opponent	H/A	Score	Aberdeen Scorer(s)	Attendance
1	1 August	Celtic	H	0–5		16,080
2	7 August	Kilmarnock	A	0–2		8,738
3	14 August	Dundee	H	0–2		8,174
4	22 August	Heart of Midlothian	A	0–3		12,803
5	29 August	St Johnstone	H	0–3		9,600
6	11 September	Rangers	A	0–3		49,226
7	18 September	Dundee United	H	1–2	Dow	11,814
8	2 October	Hibernian	H	2–2	Jess, Gillies	11,786
9	16 October	Celtic	A	0–7		60,033
10	20 October	Motherwell	A	6–5	Winters (3), Bernard, Jess, Dow	5,009
11	23 October	Kilmarnock	H	2–2	Bernard (2)	10,317
12	30 October	Rangers	H	1–5	Solberg	18,846
13	6 November	Dundee United	A	1–3	Solberg	8,170
14	21 November	St Johnstone	A	1–1	Dow	6,279
15	27 November	Hibernian	A	0–2		11,628
16	8 December	Hearts	H	3–1	Guntveit, Jess, Stavrum	10,234
17	11 December	Celtic	H	0–6		16,532
18	27 December	Dundee United	H	3–1	Zerouali, Belabed, Stavrum	16,656
19	22 January	Rangers	A	0–5		50,023
20	26 January	Motherwell	H	1–1	Zerouali	10,053
21	5 February	St Johnstone	H	2–1	Stavrum, Winters	17,568
22	23 February	Dundee	A	3–1	Dow, Stavrum, Bernard	5,784
23	26 February	Hibernian	H	4–0	Stavrum (2), Guntveit, Anderson	12,625
24	4 March	Motherwell	A	0–1		7,528
25	22 March	Heart of Midlothian	A	0–3		13,429
26	25 March	Dundee United	A	1–1	Stavrum	6,723
27	1 April	Rangers	H	1–1	Guntveit	16,521
28	12 April	Kilmarnock	A	0–1		11,525
29	15 April	Hearts	H	1–2	Stavrum	12,626
30	18 April	Dundee	H	0–1		12,403
31	22 April	Motherwell	H	2–1	Dow, Solberg	9,348
32	29 April	Hibernian	A	0–1		9,659
33	2 May	St Johnstone	A	1–2	Winters	4,217
34	6 May	Celtic	A	1–5	Winters	41,786
35	14 May	Kilmarnock	H	5–1	Zerouali, Rowson, Jess, Solberg, Winters	9,375
36	21 May	Dundee	A	2–0	Stavrum, Jess	6,449

==== Final standings ====
Pos	Team	Pld	W	D	L	GF	GA	GD	Pts	Qualification or relegation
6	Hibernian	36	10	11	15	49	61	−12	41	
7	Dundee	36	12	5	19	45	64	−19	41	
8	Dundee United	36	11	6	19	34	57	−23	39	
9	Kilmarnock	36	8	13	15	38	52	−14	37	
10	Aberdeen	36	9	6	21	44	83	−39	33	Qualification for the UEFA Cup qualifying round (Note: Since Rangers, the winners of the 1999–2000 Scottish Cup, already qualified for the UEFA Champions League, Aberdeen, the losing finalist, earned a spot in the 2000–01 UEFA Cup. As the bottom team, Aberdeen were also due to take part in a three-team play-off with Dunfermline Athletic and Falkirk, but as Falkirk's stadium did not meet SPL criteria, the play-off did not take place.)

Updated to match(es) played on end of season. Source: Scottish Professional Football League
Rules for classification: 1) Points; 2) Goal difference; 3) Goals scored

=== Scottish League Cup ===
Round	Date	Opponent	H/A	Score	Aberdeen Scorer(s)	Attendance
R2	17 August	Livingston	H	1–0	Gillies	6,756
R3	12 October	Falkirk	H	1–1 (Aberdeen win 5–3 on penalties)	Lawrie	8,166
QF	1 December	Rangers	H	1–0 (AET)	Dow	12,108
SF	13 February	Dundee United	N	1–0	Stavrum	9,500
Final	19 March	Celtic	N	0–2		50,073

=== Scottish Cup ===
Round	Date	Opponent	H/A	Score	Aberdeen Scorer(s)	Attendance
R3	29 January	St Mirren	A	1–1	Zerouali	7,565
R3R	8 February	St Mirren	H	2–0	Zerouali, Bernard	12,947
R4	20 February	Inverness Caledonian Thistle	A	1–1	Guntveit	6,290
R4R	29 February	Inverness Caledonian Thistle	H	1–0	Stavrum	18,451
QF	12 March	Dundee United	A	1–0	Jess	6,738
SF	9 April	Hibernian	N	2–1	Stavrum, Dow	22,632
Final	27 May	Rangers	N	0–4		50,685

== Squad ==
=== Appearances & Goals ===
No.	Pos	Nat	Player	Total		SPL		Scottish Cup		League Cup	
No.	Pos	Nat	Player	Apps	Goals	Apps	Goals	Apps	Goals	Apps	Goals
1	GK	(Scotland) SCO	Jim Leighton	36	0	26	0	7	0	3	0
2	DF	(Scotland) SCO	Mark Perry	24	0	18	0	3	0	3	0
3	DF	(Scotland) SCO	Derek Whyte (c)	28	0	20	0	5	0	3	0
4	DF	(England) ENG	Nigel Pepper	5	0	4	0	0	0	1	0
5	DF	(Norway) NOR	Thomas Solberg	36	4	26	4	7	0	3	0
6	DF	(Scotland) SCO	Gary Smith	7	0	6	0	0	0	1	0
7	FW	(Scotland) SCO	Jim Hamilton	8	0	7	0	0	0	1	0
8	MF	(Scotland) SCO	Eoin Jess	34	6	26	5	4	1	4	0
9	FW	(Scotland) SCO	Robbie Winters	42	7	33	7	4	0	5	0
10	MF	(Germany) GER	Andreas Mayer	27	0	21	0	3	0	3	0
11	MF	(Bulgaria) BUL	Illian Kiriakov	9	0	8	0	0	0	1	0
12	MF	(Scotland) SCO	Andy Dow	47	7	35	5	7	1	5	1
13	GK	(Scotland) SCO	Mark Peat	0	0	0	0	0	0	0	0
14	MF	(Scotland) SCO	Paul Bernard	35	5	25	4	7	1	3	0
15	DF	(Scotland) SCO	Russell Anderson	46	1	34	1	7	0	5	0
16	DF	(Scotland) SCO	Jamie Buchan	9	0	8	0	0	0	1	0
17	MF	(Scotland) SCO	David Rowson	6	1	5	1	1	0	0	0
18	FW	(Scotland) SCO	Ricky Gillies	12	2	10	1	0	0	2	1
19	MF	(Scotland) SCO	Darren Young	4	0	3	0	1	0	0	0
20	FW	(Scotland) SCO	Dennis Wyness	3	0	3	0	0	0	0	0
21	MF	(Scotland) SCO	Derek Young	16	0	14	0	0	0	2	0
22	DF	(Scotland) SCO	Michael Hart	5	0	3	0	0	0	2	0
23	GK	(Scotland) SCO	Ryan Esson	1	0	1	0	0	0	0	0
24	MF	(Scotland) SCO	Russell Duncan	0	0	0	0	0	0	0	0
25	DF	(Scotland) SCO	Stuart McCaffrey	0	0	0	0	0	0	0	0
26	MF	(Norway) NOR	Cato Guntveit	29	4	20	3	6	1	3	0
27	MF	(Iceland) ISL	Baldur Bett	1	0	1	0	0	0	0	0
28	MF	(Scotland) SCO	Iain Good	0	0	0	0	0	0	0	0
29	FW	(Scotland) SCO	Darren Mackie	5	0	4	0	0	0	1	0
30	DF	(Scotland) SCO	Jamie McAllister	45	0	34	0	7	0	4	0
31	MF	(Scotland) SCO	Fergus Tiernan	0	0	0	0	0	0	0	0
32	MF	(Scotland) SCO	Kevin Milne	0	0	0	0	0	0	0	0
33	DF	(Scotland) SCO	Phil McGuire	3	0	3	0	0	0	0	0
34	MF	(Scotland) SCO	Chris Clark	3	0	2	0	1	0	0	0
35	FW	(Iceland) ISL	Calum Bett	0	0	0	0	0	0	0	0
36	MF	(Scotland) SCO	Steven Marwick	0	0	0	0	0	0	0	0
37	DF	(Scotland) SCO	Kevin Rutkiewicz	15	0	10	0	3	0	2	0
38	DF	(Scotland) SCO	Kevin McNaughton	0	0	0	0	0	0	0	0
39	DF	(Scotland) SCO	David Lilley	19	0	17	0	2	0	0	0
40	GK	(England) ENG	David Preece	12	0	10	0	0	0	2	0
41	FW	(Scotland) SCO	Scott Michie	0	0	0	0	0	0	0	0
42	MF	(Scotland) SCO	Ross O'Donoghue	0	0	0	0	0	0	0	0
43	MF	(Belgium) BEL	Rachid Belabed	31	1	21	1	7	0	3	0
44	DF	(Argentina) ARG	Juan Cobián	4	0	3	0	0	0	1	0
45	DF	(Scotland) SCO	Jamie Clark	0	0	0	0	0	0	0	0
46	FW	(Norway) NOR	Arild Stavrum	32	12	22	9	7	2	3	1
47	MF	(Morocco) MAR	Hicham Zerouali	20	5	14	3	4	2	2	0
