= 2000–01 Aberdeen F.C. season =

Aberdeen
2000–01 season
- Chairman: Stewart Milne
- Manager: Ebbe Skovdahl
- Stadium: Pittodrie Stadium
- Scottish Premier League: 7th
- Scottish Cup: Fourth round
- Scottish League Cup: Third round
- UEFA Cup: Second preliminary round
- Top goalscorer: League: Arild Stavrum (17); All: Arild Stavrum (17)
- Highest home attendance: 18,359 vs. Rangers, 12 November 2000
- Lowest home attendance: 6,756 vs. St Johnstone, 27 March 2001
- Average home league attendance: 13,133
Home colours

Aberdeen F.C. competed in the Scottish Premier League, Scottish League Cup and Scottish Cup in season 2000–01.

== Results ==
=== Scottish Premier League ===
| Match Day | Date | Opponent | H/A | Score | Aberdeen Scorer(s) | Attendance |
|---|---|---|---|---|---|---|
| 1 | 29 July | Dunfermline Athletic | A | 0–0 | | 7,563 |
| 2 | 5 August | St Mirren | H | 2–1 | Stavrum, Perry | 11,996 |
| 3 | 13 August | Heart of Midlothian | H | 1–1 | Derek Young | 11,798 |
| 4 | 19 August | Hibernian | H | 0–2 | | 13,157 |
| 5 | 27 August | Motherwell | A | 1–1 | Winters | 5,541 |
| 6 | 9 September | St Johnstone | H | 1–1 | Winters | 11,026 |
| 7 | 16 September | Kilmarnock | A | 0–1 | | 6,876 |
| 8 | 23 September | Dundee United | A | 5–3 | Winters (3), Jess, Derek Young | 7,699 |
| 9 | 1 October | Celtic | H | 1–1 | Winters | 18,239 |
| 10 | 14 October | Dundee | H | 0–2 | | 16,035 |
| 11 | 21 October | Dunfermline Athletic | H | 0–0 | | 1,933 |
| 12 | 28 October | St Mirren | A | 0–2 | | 5,763 |
| 13 | 4 November | Heart of Midlothian | A | 0–3 | | 12,744 |
| 14 | 12 November | Rangers | H | 1–2 | Stavrum | 18,359 |
| 15 | 18 November | Hibernian | A | 2–0 | Stavrum, Mayer | 10,996 |
| 16 | 25 November | Motherwell | H | 3–3 | Di Rocco (2), Stavrum | 12,243 |
| 17 | 28 November | St Johnstone | A | 0–0 | | 4,896 |
| 18 | 2 December | Kilmarnock | H | 1–2 | Stavrum | 12,573 |
| 19 | 13 December | Rangers | A | 1–3 | Stavrum | 45,285 |
| 20 | 16 December | Celtic | A | 0–6 | | 60,013 |
| 21 | 23 December | Dundee | A | 2–2 | Di Rocco, Stavrum | 9,093 |
| 22 | 26 December | Dunfermline Athletic | A | 2–3 | Rowson, Dow | 7,194 |
| 23 | 2 January | Heart of Midlothian | H | 1–0 | Rowson | 13,522 |
| 24 | 31 January | Rangers | A | 0–1 | | 45,621 |
| 25 | 10 February | Motherwell | A | 1–0 | Derek Young | 6,680 |
| 26 | 21 February | St Mirren | H | 3–0 | Stavrum (3) | 9,946 |
| 27 | 3 March | Kilmarnock | A | 0–0 | | 6,580 |
| 28 | 13 March | Hibernian | H | 1–0 | Guntveit | 9,357 |
| 29 | 17 March | Dundee United | A | 1–1 | Winters | 8,457 |
| 30 | 27 March | St Johnstone | H | 3–3 | Derek Young, Winters, Darren Young | 8,537 |
| 31 | 1 April | Celtic | H | 0–1 | | 16,067 |
| 32 | 4 April | Dundee United | H | 4–1 | Stavrum (3), Derek Young | 9,962 |
| 33 | 7 April | Dundee | H | 0–2 | | 11,400 |
| 34 | 21 April | Dunfermline Athletic | H | 1–0 | Stavrum | 8,613 |
| 35 | 28 April | St Johnstone | A | 3–0 | Mackie (2), Stavrum | 3,611 |
| 36 | 5 May | Motherwell | A | 2–0 | Stavrum, Winters | 3,905 |
| 37 | 12 May | St Mirren | A | 1–2 | Derek Young | 5,780 |
| 38 | 20 May | Dundee United | H | 1–2 | Stavrum | 11,633 |

==== Final standings ====
| Pos | Team | Pld | W | D | L | GF | GA | GD | Pts | Qualification or relegation (Note: Teams played each other three times (33 matches), before the league split into two groups (the top six and the bottom six) for the last five matches.) |
|---|---|---|---|---|---|---|---|---|---|---|
| 5 | Heart of Midlothian | 38 | 14 | 10 | 14 | 56 | 50 | +6 | 52 | |
| 6 | Dundee | 38 | 13 | 8 | 17 | 51 | 49 | +2 | 47 | Qualification for the UEFA Intertoto Cup first round (Note: Dundee qualified for the 2001 UEFA Intertoto Cup as the highest-placed team to apply for a place in the competition.) |
| 7 | Aberdeen | 38 | 11 | 12 | 15 | 45 | 52 | −7 | 45 | |
| 8 | Motherwell | 38 | 12 | 7 | 19 | 42 | 56 | −14 | 43 | |
| 9 | Dunfermline Athletic | 38 | 11 | 9 | 18 | 34 | 54 | −20 | 42 | |

Source: Scottish Professional Football League
Rules for classification: 1) Points; 2) Goal difference; 3) Goals scored

=== Scottish League Cup ===
| Round | Date | Opponent | H/A | Score | Aberdeen Scorer(s) | Attendance |
|---|---|---|---|---|---|---|
| R3 | 6 September | Rangers | A | 2–4 | Winters, Derek Young | 37,029 |

=== Scottish Cup ===
| Round | Date | Opponent | H/A | Score | Aberdeen Scorer(s) | Attendance |
|---|---|---|---|---|---|---|
| R3 | 27 January | Alloa Athletic | A | 3–0 | Rowson, Winters, Mackie | 2,877 |
| R4 | 17 February | Livingston | A | 0–0 | | 6,289 |
| R4R | 6 March | Livingston | H | 0–1 | | 9,959 |

=== UEFA Cup ===
| Round | Date | Opponent | H/A | Score | Aberdeen Scorer(s) | Attendance |
|---|---|---|---|---|---|---|
| PR2 L1 | 10 August | (Republic of Ireland) Bohemian | H | 1–2 | Winters | 13,638 |
| PR2 L2 | 24 August | (Republic of Ireland) Bohemian | A | 1–0 | Morrison | 8,000 |

== Players ==
=== Squad ===
Note: Flags indicate national team as defined under FIFA eligibility rules; some limited exceptions apply. Players may hold more than one non-FIFA nationality.

| No. | Pos. | Nation | Player |
|---|---|---|---|
| 0 | FW | MAR | Hicham Zerouali |
| 1 | GK | SCO | Jim Leighton |
| 2 | DF | SCO | Russell Anderson |
| 3 | DF | SCO | Derek Whyte (captain) |
| 4 | MF | NOR | Cato Guntveit |
| 5 | DF | NOR | Thomas Solberg |
| 6 | DF | SCO | Jamie McAllister |
| 7 | MF | GER | Andreas Mayer |
| 8 | MF | SCO | Eoin Jess |
| 9 | FW | SCO | Robbie Winters |
| 10 | FW | NOR | Arild Stavrum |
| 12 | MF | SCO | Andy Dow |
| 14 | MF | SCO | Paul Bernard |
| 15 | DF | SCO | David Lilley |
| 16 | MF | BEL | Rachid Belabed |
| 17 | MF | SCO | David Rowson |

| No. | Pos. | Nation | Player |
|---|---|---|---|
| 18 | MF | SCO | Chris Clark |
| 19 | MF | SCO | Darren Young |
| 20 | DF | SCO | Kevin Rutkiewicz |
| 21 | MF | SCO | Derek Young |
| 23 | GK | SCO | Ryan Esson |
| 24 | DF | SCO | Phil McGuire |
| 25 | FW | SCO | Darren Mackie |
| 26 | DF | SCO | Mark Perry |
| 27 | DF | ISL | Calum Bett |
| 28 | MF | SCO | Fergus Tiernan |
| 29 | MF | SCO | Ross O'Donoghue |
| 30 | GK | ENG | David Preece |
| 31 | DF | SCO | Kevin McNaughton |
| 32 | MF | SCO | John Inglis |
| 32 | FW | FRA | Alex Di Rocco |

==== Players out on loan ====
Note: Flags indicate national team as defined under FIFA eligibility rules; some limited exceptions apply. Players may hold more than one non-FIFA nationality.

| No. | Pos. | Nation | Player |
|---|---|---|---|
| –– | DF | SCO | Michael Hart (at Livingston) |
| –– | DF | SCO | Stuart McCaffrey (at Inverness Caledonian Thistle) |

| No. | Pos. | Nation | Player |
|---|---|---|---|
| –– | DF | SCO | Russell Duncan (at Forfar Athletic) |

== Squad ==
=== Appearances & Goals ===
| No. | Pos | Nat | Player | Total | | SPL | | Scottish Cup | | League Cup | | UEFA Cup | |
| No. | Pos | Nat | Player | Apps | Goals | Apps | Goals | Apps | Goals | Apps | Goals | Apps | Goals |
|---|---|---|---|---|---|---|---|---|---|---|---|---|---|
| 0 | MF | (Morocco) MAR | Hicham Zerouali | 7 | 0 | 5 | 0 | 0 | 0 | 0 | 0 | 2 | 0 |
| 1 | GK | (Scotland) SCO | Jim Leighton | 0 | 0 | 0 | 0 | 0 | 0 | 0 | 0 | 0 | 0 |
| 2 | DF | (Scotland) SCO | Russell Anderson | 0 | 0 | 0 | 0 | 0 | 0 | 0 | 0 | 0 | 0 |
| 3 | DF | (Scotland) SCO | Derek Whyte (c) | 33 | 0 | 29 | 0 | 2 | 0 | 1 | 0 | 1 | 0 |
| 4 | MF | (Norway) NOR | Cato Guntveit | 34 | 1 | 30 | 1 | 2 | 0 | 1 | 0 | 1 | 0 |
| 5 | DF | (Norway) NOR | Thomas Solberg | 25 | 0 | 22 | 0 | 3 | 0 | 0 | 0 | 0 | 0 |
| 6 | DF | (Scotland) SCO | Jamie McAllister | 28 | 0 | 25 | 0 | 2 | 0 | 1 | 0 | 0 | 0 |
| 7 | MF | (Germany) GER | Andreas Mayer | 7 | 1 | 7 | 1 | 0 | 0 | 0 | 0 | 0 | 0 |
| 8 | MF | (Scotland) SCO | Eoin Jess | 15 | 1 | 14 | 1 | 0 | 0 | 0 | 0 | 1 | 0 |
| 9 | FW | (Scotland) SCO | Robbie Winters | 43 | 12 | 37 | 9 | 3 | 1 | 1 | 1 | 2 | 1 |
| 10 | FW | (Norway) NOR | Arild Stavrum | 35 | 17 | 31 | 17 | 3 | 0 | 0 | 0 | 1 | 0 |
| 12 | MF | (Scotland) SCO | Andy Dow | 19 | 1 | 15 | 1 | 2 | 0 | 0 | 0 | 2 | 0 |
| 14 | MF | (Scotland) SCO | Paul Bernard | 4 | 0 | 3 | 0 | 0 | 0 | 0 | 0 | 1 | 0 |
| 15 | DF | (Scotland) SCO | David Lilley | 9 | 0 | 8 | 0 | 1 | 0 | 0 | 0 | 0 | 0 |
| 16 | MF | (Belgium) BEL | Rachid Belabed | 25 | 0 | 19 | 0 | 3 | 0 | 1 | 0 | 2 | 0 |
| 17 | MF | (Scotland) SCO | David Rowson | 41 | 3 | 35 | 2 | 3 | 1 | 1 | 0 | 2 | 0 |
| 18 | MF | (Scotland) SCO | Chris Clark | 27 | 0 | 24 | 0 | 1 | 0 | 1 | 0 | 1 | 0 |
| 19 | MF | (Scotland) SCO | Darren Young | 37 | 1 | 31 | 1 | 3 | 0 | 1 | 0 | 2 | 0 |
| 20 | DF | (Scotland) SCO | Kevin Rutkiewicz | 4 | 0 | 3 | 0 | 0 | 0 | 0 | 0 | 1 | 0 |
| 21 | MF | (Scotland) SCO | Derek Young | 36 | 7 | 31 | 6 | 3 | 0 | 1 | 1 | 1 | 0 |
| 22 | DF | (Scotland) SCO | Michael Hart | 0 | 0 | 0 | 0 | 0 | 0 | 0 | 0 | 0 | 0 |
| 23 | GK | (Scotland) SCO | Ryan Esson | 40 | 0 | 36 | 0 | 1 | 0 | 1 | 0 | 2 | 0 |
| 24 | DF | (Scotland) SCO | Phil McGuire | 35 | 0 | 29 | 0 | 3 | 0 | 1 | 0 | 2 | 0 |
| 25 | FW | (Scotland) SCO | Darren Mackie | 26 | 3 | 22 | 2 | 2 | 1 | 1 | 0 | 1 | 0 |
| 26 | DF | (Scotland) SCO | Mark Perry | 10 | 1 | 9 | 1 | 0 | 0 | 0 | 0 | 1 | 0 |
| 27 | MF | (Iceland) ISL | Calum Bett | 2 | 0 | 2 | 0 | 0 | 0 | 0 | 0 | 0 | 0 |
| 28 | MF | (Scotland) SCO | Fergus Tiernan | 2 | 0 | 2 | 0 | 0 | 0 | 0 | 0 | 0 | 0 |
| 29 | MF | (Scotland) SCO | Ross O'Donoghue | 2 | 0 | 2 | 0 | 0 | 0 | 0 | 0 | 0 | 0 |
| 30 | GK | (England) ENG | David Preece | 4 | 0 | 2 | 0 | 2 | 0 | 0 | 0 | 0 | 0 |
| 31 | DF | (Scotland) SCO | Kevin McNaughton | 38 | 0 | 33 | 0 | 2 | 0 | 1 | 0 | 2 | 0 |
| 32 | DF | (Scotland) SCO | John Inglis | 0 | 0 | 0 | 0 | 0 | 0 | 0 | 0 | 0 | 0 |
| 32 | FW | (France) FRA | Alex Di Rocco | 10 | 3 | 10 | 3 | 0 | 0 | 0 | 0 | 0 | 0 |
