= 2000 Scottish Cup final =

2000 Scottish Cup Final
- Event: 1999–2000 Scottish Cup
Aberdeen	Rangers
0	4
- Date: 27 May 2000
- Venue: Hampden Park, Glasgow
- Man of the Match: Jörg Albertz
- Referee: Jim McCluskey
- Attendance: 50,865

The 2000 Scottish Cup Final was the final match of the 1999–2000 Scottish Cup. It was played on 27 May 2000 at Hampden Park in Glasgow, Scotland, and was the final of the 115th Scottish Cup. The final was contested by Scottish Premier League clubs Aberdeen and Rangers. Rangers won the match 4–0. The match was the last in the career of Aberdeen goalkeeper Jim Leighton. He was injured after two minutes and was unable to play on. With no goalkeeper on the substitutes bench, striker Robbie Winters played in goal for Aberdeen.

== Route to the final ==
=== Aberdeen ===
As a Scottish Premier League club, Aberdeen started in the third round where they played St. Mirren at home and won 2–0 at Pittodrie Stadium. In the fourth round they were drawn away at Scottish Football League First Division Inverness Caledonian Thistle who had knocked out Old Firm Celtic in the previous round. After a 1–1 draw at Caledonian Stadium, Aberdeen progressed after a 1–0 win at Pittodrie. In the quarter finals they played Dundee United away. At Tannadice Park, Aberdeen won 1–0. In the semi-final at neutral Hampden Park, Aberdeen played Hibernian and won 2–1 to reach the final.

=== Rangers ===
Rangers as a Scottish Premier League club also started in the third round where they were drawn away at St Johnstone and won 2–0 at McDiarmid Park. In the next round they played Greenock Morton away, although the match was moved to Love Street in Paisley on the advice of the police. Rangers won 1–0. In the quarter final they played Heart of Midlothian at home and defeated them 4–1 at Ibrox. In the semi-final at Hampden Park, Rangers defeated Ayr United of the Scottish First Division 7–0. The match was noted for Rangers' Andrei Kanchelskis standing on the football and saluting during the match, which angered Ayr United's manager Gordon Dalziel who felt it was disrespectful.

== Pre-match ==
The clubs share a historic rivalry. Rangers went into the final looking to win a double after having won the 1999–2000 Scottish Premier League. Aberdeen on the other hand had finished bottom of the Scottish Premier League, 57 points behind Rangers. They were reprieved from relegation after Dunfermline Athletic and Falkirk, who had finished as second and third respectively in the Scottish First Division, were denied the opportunity to play-off with Aberdeen due to their stadiums not meeting Scottish Premier League entry criteria.

Before the match, Rangers fans started a growing movement for everyone to wear orange at the final as a tribute to their Dutch manager Dick Advocaat and other Dutch players at the club. The club supported this and produced replica orange Netherlands national football team shirts for fans. Advocaat proposed that Rangers played the final in the orange kit but, after the players were unanimous in their disagreement, the idea was dropped and they played in their regular home kit. Some observers noted the coincidence that orange was also used as a Protestant colour, as the likes of the Orange Order used it, which led to suggestions of underlying meanings in the colour choice. The Rangers fans wore orange during the final, leading commentators to describe Hampden Park as being awash in a "sea of orange". Aberdeen's goalkeeper Jim Leighton, who was retiring after the match, said that he was going to be the last player to leave the pitch to commemorate his career.

== Match ==
Two minutes into the match, Leighton collided with Rangers' Rod Wallace which resulted in Leighton fracturing his jaw and having to be stretchered off. The Aberdeen manager Ebbe Skovdahl had not named a goalkeeper amongst his three substitutes, despite Leighton warning Skovdahl that he felt it was a mistake not to. Robbie Winters, who had been named on the bench, had volunteered weeks prior to play in goal if something like this occurred, was substituted on to replace Leighton. He went on wearing Ryan Esson's goalkeeper's jersey after Esson had changed into his cup final suit to take his seat in the stands after having helped Leighton warm up pre-match. It was noted by the media that Esson's jersey was too large for Winters.

Rangers took the lead in the 35th minute after Giovanni van Bronckhorst put Jörg Albertz's free kick past Winters. Rangers went into half time 1–0 up. In the second half, goals from Tony Vidmar, Billy Dodds and Albertz helped Rangers to a 4–0 victory to win the Scottish Cup for the 29th time. This victory also made Rangers the first club in the world to have won 100 trophies.

=== Details ===
27 May 2000

Aberdeen	0–4	Rangers
	Report Report-2	Van Bronckhorst 36'; Vidmar 47'; Dodds 50'; Albertz 51'

Hampden Park, Glasgow
Attendance: 50,865
Referee: Jim McCluskey

Aberdeen:
GK	1	(Scotland) Jim Leighton	(substituted off) 3'
DF	3	(Scotland) Derek Whyte (c)
DF	5	(Norway) Thomas Solberg
DF	15	(Scotland) Russell Anderson	(substituted off) 41'
DF	30	(Scotland) Jamie McAllister
MF	14	(Scotland) Paul Bernard
MF	12	(Scotland) Andy Dow
MF	17	(Scotland) David Rowson
MF	26	(Norway) Cato Guntveit
FW	8	(Scotland) Eoin Jess
FW	46	(Norway) Arild Stavrum	(substituted off) 68'
Substitutes:
MF		(Belgium) Rachid Belabed	(substituted on) 41'
FW		(Scotland) Robbie Winters	(substituted on) 3'
FW		(Morocco) Hicham Zerouali	(substituted on) 68'
Manager:
(Denmark) Ebbe Skovdahl

Rangers:
GK	1	(Germany) Stefan Klos
DF	2	(United States) Claudio Reyna
DF	3	(Australia) Craig Moore	(substituted off) 71'
DF	4	(Australia) Tony Vidmar
DF	5	(Netherlands) Arthur Numan (c)
MF	7	(Russia) Andrei Kanchelskis
MF	6	(Scotland) Barry Ferguson
MF	8	(Netherlands) Giovanni van Bronckhorst	(substituted off) 73'
MF	11	(Germany) Jörg Albertz
FW	10	(England) Rod Wallace	(substituted off) 66'
FW	9	(Scotland) Billy Dodds
Substitutes:
DF	14	(Italy) Sergio Porrini	(substituted on) 71'
MF	15	(Turkey) Tugay Kerimoğlu	(substituted on) 73'
FW	12	(Scotland) Neil McCann	(substituted on) 66'
Manager:
(Netherlands) Dick Advocaat

== Aftermath ==
Following the final, the Scottish Football Association (SFA) amended their rules for the Scottish Cup stating that clubs could include up to five substitutes on their bench and one of those must be a recognised goalkeeper. This was done to decrease the chances of outfield players having to play as a goalkeeper happening again following a proposal from Partick Thistle which was approved unanimously by the SFA's member clubs. Skovdahl offered Leighton a six-month extension to his contract but he never played again due to the injury that required metal plates inserted into his skull, including not playing at his testimonial match against Middlesbrough.

Despite losing, Aberdeen qualified for the 2000–01 UEFA Cup as Rangers had already earned entry into the 2000–01 UEFA Champions League following winning the 1999–2000 Scottish Premier League. The following year, Aberdeen finished 7th in the Scottish Premier League whilst Rangers finished second behind Celtic. Neither club reached the final of the Scottish Cup the following year.

== See also ==
- Aberdeen F.C.–Rangers F.C. rivalry
