= Super Caley go ballistic, Celtic are atrocious =

Celtic 1–3 Inverness CT
- Event: 1999–2000 Scottish Cup Third round
Celtic	Inverness Caledonian Thistle
1	3
- Date: 8 February 2000
- Venue: Celtic Park, Glasgow
- Man of the Match: Charlie Christie (Inverness CT)
- Referee: Dougie McDonald
- Attendance: 34,389
- Weather: Rain

Super Caley go ballistic, Celtic are atrocious is a memorable headline to a report by the Scottish Sun newspaper editor Paul Hickson on a 1999–2000 Scottish Cup third round tie between Scottish Premier League side Celtic and Scottish First Division side Inverness Caledonian Thistle in February 2000 which resulted in a surprise win for Inverness; the phrase has since been in common use when recalling the match. It is regarded as one of the most memorable upsets in the history of the competition.

== Background ==
Celtic, formed in 1888, form one half of the Old Firm rivalry alongside Rangers; the two are dominant in Scottish football, with Celtic alone having won 36 League titles and 30 Scottish Cup titles by 2000. At the time of the match, Celtic were playing under the management of England and Liverpool legend John Barnes and were out of the race for the Scottish Premier League title. They had been knocked out of the UEFA Cup by French side Olympique Lyonnais in November 1999, with star striker Henrik Larsson breaking a leg in that match which ruled him out for the season. Despite that setback, Celtic boasted a line-up featuring internationals such as veteran Scotland defender Tom Boyd and promising striker Mark Burchill, as well as Australian Mark Viduka, Dutchman Regi Blinker, Norwegian Vidar Riseth, Slovak Ľubomír Moravčík, Israeli Eyal Berkovic, all of whom started the match, while former Arsenal legend Ian Wright was among the substitutes.

Inverness Caledonian Thistle were founded in 1994 out of a merger between Highland League stalwarts, Caledonian and Inverness Thistle, which took place in order to gain election to the Scottish Football League alongside Ross County. Inverness had quickly risen through the leagues at the hands of Steve Paterson, being promoted from the SFA Second Division in 1999, and were in sixth place in the First Division at the time of the match. Their only major international player was local defender Richard Hastings, who went on to help Canada win the 2000 CONCACAF Gold Cup just days after playing at Celtic Park.

== Match ==
The match was initially due to take place on Saturday 29 January, but was called off an hour before kickoff due to storm damage to the roof of the newly built Lisbon Lions Stand – it was rescheduled for 10 days later. Barry Wilson scored the opening goal for Inverness with a 12th-minute header, before the score was levelled soon afterwards by Mark Burchill. In the 24th minute, Inverness retook the lead when an off-target header from Bobby Mann was deflected past goalkeeper Jonathan Gould by Ľubomír Moravčík.

Reports have stated that during the half time interval, Celtic's Mark Viduka threw his boots into the changing room bin and refused to come out for the second half, after an altercation with assistant coach, Eric Black. Viduka was replaced by Ian Wright, in what was the Englishman's penultimate appearance before being transferred to Burnley a fortnight later.

In the 56th minute, Barry Wilson was fouled in the box by Regi Blinker, with Paul Sheerin scoring the subsequent penalty to give the visitors a 3–1 lead which they held until the final whistle.

== Aftermath ==
The shock result made national and international news, with The Sun's headline "Super Caley go Ballistic, Celtic are Atrocious" becoming the most famous; it is still widely regarded as one of the most famous sporting headlines of all time. The phrase, a play on the Mary Poppins song Supercalifragilisticexpialidocious, is still brought up any time the clubs face each other.

Immediately after the match, crowds of Celtic fans gathered outside the main stand of Parkhead calling for the dismissal of head coach John Barnes. Two days later Barnes was sacked, with director of football Kenny Dalglish taking over for the remainder of the season (winning the League Cup) before being replaced by Martin O'Neill, an appointment which heralded a successful period for the club of three league championships and four cup wins in the following five seasons as well as reaching the 2003 UEFA Cup final.

Inverness were given cases of beer by the Celtic officials for the bus journey home, and the money received from the game helped to stabilise the club; they were eventually promoted to the top division in 2004. In the following round of the Scottish Cup, they were drawn at home against eventual finalists Aberdeen, going ahead in the 50th minute through Bobby Mann, before Cato Guntveit equalised in the 80th minute to take the game to a replay at Pittodrie, where Aberdeen won 1–0 courtesy of a goal from Arild Stavrum.

Three years later, both sides met in the 2002–03 Scottish Cup quarter-final, this time at a packed Caledonian Stadium, where Dennis Wyness scored the only goal to give Inverness another unlikely win. Caley went on to lose 1–0 to Dundee at Hampden Park in the semi-finals.
