= 2010–11 Inverness Caledonian Thistle F.C. season =

Scottish football club season

Inverness Caledonian Thistle
2010–11 season
- Chairman: George Fraser
- Manager: Terry Butcher
- Stadium: Caledonian Stadium
- Scottish Premier League: 7th
- Scottish Cup: Quarter-final
- League Cup: Third round
- Top goalscorer: League: Adam Rooney (15); All: Adam Rooney (21)
- Highest home attendance: 7,547 vs. Celtic Scottish Premier League 14 August 2010
- Lowest home attendance: 1,001 vs. Peterhead League Cup 25 August 2010
Home colours	Away colours

For the 2010–11 season, Inverness Caley Thistle compete in the Scottish Premier League, having been promoted as champions of the Scottish First Division in 2009–10. They reached the quarter-finals of the Scottish Cup, and the third round of the League Cup, before being eliminated by Celtic in both competitions.

== Results and fixtures ==
=== Scottish Premier League ===
14 August 2010 SPL	Inverness Caledonian Thistle	0–1	Celtic	Caledonian Stadium
		BBC SPORT	McCourt 56'	Attendance: 7,547; Referee: Murray

22 August 2010 SPL	Dundee United	0–4	Inverness Caledonian Thistle	Tannadice Park
		BBC SPORT	McCann 34'; Rooney 51'; Duncan 53'; Rooney 82' (pen.)	Attendance: 6,575; Referee: Muir

28 August 2010 SPL	Inverness Caledonian Thistle	0–1	Hamilton	Caledonian Stadium
		BBC SPORT	Imrie 1'	Attendance: 3,851; Referee: McKendrick

11 September 2010 SPL	Hibernian	1–1	Inverness Caledonian Thistle	Easter Road
	Riordan 8'	BBC SPORT	Rooney 82' (pen.)	Attendance: 10,358; Referee: Allan

18 September 2010 SPL	Inverness Caledonian Thistle	1–3	Hearts	Caledonian Stadium
	Odhiambo 37'	BBC SPORT	Innes 45' (Og.); Stevenson 55'; Elliot 69'	Attendance: 4,515; Referee: Brines

25 September 2010 SPL	St Mirren	1–2	Inverness Caledonian Thistle	St Mirren Park
	McGowan 77'	BBC SPORT	Odhiambo 45+2' (50)	Attendance: 3,954; Referee: Finnie

2 October 2010 SPL	Inverness Caledonian Thistle	2–0	Aberdeen	Caledonian Stadium
	Hayes 19'; Rooney 61'	BBC SPORT	Paton (yellow card) (red card)	Attendance: 6,414; Referee: Murray

16 October SPL	Inverness Caledonian Thistle	1–1	St Johnstone	Caledonian Stadium
	Hayes 71'	BBC SPORT	Samuel 8'	Attendance: 4,883; Referee: Muir

23 October 2010 SPL	Kilmarnock	1–2	Inverness Caledonian Thistle	Rugby Park
	Miguel 74'	BBC SPORT	Rooney 42' (pen.); Hayes 66'	Attendance: 4,508; Referee: Norris

30 October SPL	Rangers	1–1	Inverness Caledonian Thistle	Ibrox
	Edu 11'	BBC SPORT	Odhiambo 81'	Attendance: 43,697; Referee: Brines

6 November 2010 SPL	Inverness Caledonian Thistle	1–2	Motherwell	Caledonian Stadium
	Duff 75'	BBC SPORT	Gow 33'; Blackman 43'	Attendance: 4,054; Referee: Tumilty

9 November 2010 SPL	Aberdeen	1–2	Inverness Caledonian Thistle	Pittodrie
	Velicka 49'	BBC SPORT	Rooney 34' (pen.); Munro 81'	Attendance: 5,917; Referee: McKendrick

13 November 2010 SPL	Hamilton	1–3	Inverness Caledonian Thistle	New Douglas Park
	Imrie 29'	BBC SPORT	Rooney 34' 59'; Hayes 52'	Attendance: 2,019; Referee: McLean

20 November 2010 SPL	Inverness Caledonian Thistle	4–2	Hibernian	Caledonian Stadium
	Foran 7'; Rooney 51' (pen.) 70' 80'	BBC SPORT	Riordan 66'; Miller 78' (pen.); Hanlon (red card)	Attendance: 4,217; Referee: Conroy

27 November 2010 SPL	Celtic	2–2	Inverness Caledonian Thistle	Celtic Park
	Ki 38'; McCourt 65'	BBC SPORT	Foran 70'; Munro 83'	Attendance: 46,096; Referee: Hamer

11 December 2010 SPL	Inverness Caledonian Thistle	1–1	Rangers	Caledonian Stadium
	Hayes 31'	BBC SPORT	Miller 57'	Attendance: 6,799; Referee: Murray

18 December 2010 SPL	Hearts	1–1	Inverness Caledonian Thistle	Tynecastle Stadium
	Kyle 25' (pen.)	BBC SPORT	Munro 17'	Attendance: 12,994; Referee: Winter

26 December 2010 SPL	Inverness Caledonian Thistle	1–2	St Mirren	Caledonian Stadium
	Cox 8'	BBC SPORT	Thomson 44' 85'	Attendance: 3,819; Referee: Thomson

29 December 2010 SPL	Inverness Caledonian Thistle	1–3	Kilmarnock	Caledonian Stadium
	Foran 71'	BBC SPORT	Bryson 26'; Kelly 68'; Hamill 68'	Attendance: 3,735; Referee: Collum

2 January 2011 SPL	St Johnstone	1–0	Inverness Caledonian Thistle	McDiarmid Park
	Samuel 85'	BBC SPORT		Attendance: 3,126; Referee: Salmond

15 January 2011 SPL	Motherwell	0–0	Inverness Caledonian Thistle	Fir Park
		BBC SPORT		Attendance: 3,728; Referee: Norris

18 January 2011 SPL	Rangers	1–0	Inverness Caledonian Thistle	Ibrox
	Davis 45'	BBC SPORT		Attendance: 41,623; Referee: Thomson

22 January 2011 SPL	Inverness Caledonian Thistle	1–1	Hamilton	Caledonian Stadium
	Sánchez 18'	BBC SPORT	Antoine-Curier 45+1' (pen.)	Attendance: 3,241; Referee: Finnie

26 January 2011 SPL	Inverness Caledonian Thistle	0–2	Aberdeen	Caledonian Stadium
	Munro (red card)	BBC SPORT	Jack 44'; Blackman 49'	Attendance: 4,468; Referee: Conroy

12 February 2011 SPL	St Mirren	3–3	Inverness Caledonian Thistle	St Mirren Park
	Higdon 28' (pen.); Thomson 29'; McGregor 74'	BBC SPORT	Rooney 6' 61'; Doran 33'	Attendance: 3,203; Referee: Madden

19 February 2011 SPL	Inverness Caledonian Thistle	2–0	St Johnstone	Caledonian Stadium
	Tokely 28'; Duncan 62'	BBC SPORT		Attendance: 3,942; Referee: Collum

26 February 2011 SPL	Hibernian	2–0	Inverness Caledonian Thistle	Easter Road
	Booth 58'; Stevenson 89'	BBC SPORT		Attendance: 13,841; Referee: Thomson

1 March 2011 SPL	Inverness Caledonian Thistle	0–2	Dundee United	Caledonian Stadium
		BBC SPORT	Buaben 75'; Robertson 90'	Attendance: 3,392; Referee: McLean

5 March 2011 SPL	Inverness Caledonian Thistle	3–0	Motherwell	Caledonian Stadium
	Sutherland 18'; Foran 64'; MacDonald 72'	BBC SPORT		Attendance: 3,563; Referee: Brines

19 March 2011 SPL	Dundee United	1–0	Inverness Caledonian Thistle	Tannadice
	Swanson 43'	BBC SPORT		Attendance: 6,548; Referee: Salmond

9 April 2011 SPL	Kilmarnock	1–1	Inverness Caledonian Thistle	Rugby Park
	Kelly 13'	BBC SPORT	Hayes 10'	Attendance: 4,518; Referee: McKendrick

16 April 2011 SPL	Inverness Caledonian Thistle	1– 1	Hearts	Caledonian Stadium
	Doran 6'; Tokely (yellow card) 78' (red card)	BBC Sport	Elliot 53'	Attendance: 4,336; Referee: Crawford Allan

25 April 2011 SPL	St Johnstone	0– 3	Inverness Caledonian Thistle	McDiarmid Park
		BBC Sport	Innes 36'; Doran 57'; Foran 70'	Attendance: 2,395; Referee: Bobby Madden

30 April 2011 SPL	Aberdeen	1– 0	Inverness Caledonian Thistle	Pittodrie
	Pawlett 75'	BBC Sport		Attendance: 6,280; Referee: George Salmond

4 May 2011 SPL	Inverness Caledonian Thistle	3– 2	Celtic	Caledonian Stadium
	Mulgrew 7' (o.g.); Munro 53'; Sutherland 62'	BBC Sport	Commons 9', 90' (pen.)	Attendance: 6,072; Referee: Stevie O'Reilly

7 May 2011 SPL	Inverness Caledonian Thistle	1– 0	St Mirren	Caledonian Stadium
	Duncan (red card) 71'; Rooney 85'	BBC Sport		Attendance: 3,446; Referee: Bobby Madden

11 May 2011 SPL	Inverness Caledonian Thistle	2– 0	Hibernian	Caledonian Stadium
	Foran 42'; Ross 51'	BBC Sport		Attendance: 3,344; Referee: Stephen Finnie

14 May 2011 SPL	Hamilton	1– 2	Inverness Caledonian Thistle	New Douglas Park
	Mensing 50'	BBC Sport	Foran 44'; Rooney 57'	Attendance: 2,017; Referee: Iain Brines

==== Final league table ====
Pos	Team	Pld	W	D	L	GF	GA	GD	Pts
5	Kilmarnock	38	13	10	15	53	55	−2	49
6	Motherwell	38	13	7	18	40	60	−20	46
7	Inverness Caledonian Thistle	38	14	11	13	52	44	+8	53
8	St Johnstone	38	11	11	16	23	43	−20	44
9	Aberdeen	38	11	5	22	39	59	−20	38

Source: SPFL Archive
Rules for classification: 1) points; 2) goal difference; 3) number of goals scored.

=== Scottish Cup ===
8 January 2011 Scottish Cup round 4	Inverness Caledonian Thistle	2–0	Elgin City	Caledonian Stadium
	Sánchez 90+2'; Rooney 90+4'	BBC SPORT		Attendance: 2,808; Referee: Smith

5 February 2011 Scottish Cup round 5	Inverness Caledonian Thistle	5–1	Morton	Caledonian Stadium
	Foran 19' 86'; Rooney 38' 66'; Hogg 62'	BBC SPORT	Lyle 83'	Attendance: 1,893; Referee: Charleston

16 March 2011 Scottish Cup Quarter-final	Inverness Caledonian Thistle	1–2	Celtic	Caledonian Stadium
	Rooney 44' (pen.)	BBC Sport	Ledley 45+2' 68'	Attendance: 6,064; Referee: Tumilty

=== Scottish League Cup ===
31 July 2010 League Cup round 1	Inverness Caledonian Thistle	3–0	Queen's Park	Caledonian Stadium
	Cox 22'; Odhiambo 55'; Tokely 57'	BBC SPORT		Attendance: 1,099; Referee: McLean

25 August 2010 League Cup round 2	Inverness Caledonian Thistle	3–0	Peterhead	Caledonian Stadium
	Rooney 32' (pen.); Munro 38'; Rooney 49'	BBC SPORT		Attendance: 1,001; Referee: Somers

22 September 2010 League Cup round 3	Celtic	6–0	Inverness Caledonian Thistle	Celtic Park
	Samaras 17' (37), 57'; Hooper 21'; Stokes 74' (pen.), 81'	BBC Sport		Attendance: 17,429; Referee: McDonald

== Current squad ==
Note: Flags indicate national team as defined under FIFA eligibility rules; some limited exceptions apply. Players may hold more than one non-FIFA nationality.

No.	Pos.	Nation	Player
1	GK	SCO	Ryan Esson
2	DF	SCO	David Proctor
3	DF	SCO	Ross Tokely
4	DF	SCO	Stuart Duff
5	DF	SCO	Stuart Golabek
6	MF	ENG	Lee Cox
7	FW	TAN	Eric Odhiambo
8	MF	SCO	Russell Duncan
9	FW	IRL	Richie Foran (club captain)
10	FW	IRL	Adam Rooney
11	MF	IRL	Jonathan Hayes
12	GK	NIR	Jonathan Tuffey
14	DF	SCO	Grant Munro

No.	Pos.	Nation	Player
15	DF	SCO	Chris Innes
16	MF	SCO	Roy McBain
17	MF	SCO	Gavin Morrison
18	FW	ISR	Gil Blumstein
19	MF	SCO	Nick Ross
20	FW	SCO	Shane Sutherland
21	DF	SCO	Graeme Shinnie
22	GK	ENG	Max Johnson
23	FW	ESP	Dani Sánchez
24	DF	FRA	Kenny Gillet
26	MF	IRL	Aaron Doran (on loan from Blackburn Rovers)
27	FW	SCO	Alex MacDonald (on loan from Burnley)
28	DF	ENG	Chris Hogg

== Transfers ==
Transfers In
Player	Age*	From	Fee
(France) Kenny Gillet	24	(England) Barnet	Free
(Northern Ireland) Jonathan Tuffey	23	(Scotland) Partick Thistle	Free
(Scotland) Chris Innes	33	(Scotland) St Mirren	Free
(England) Chris Hogg	25	(Scotland) Hibernian	Free
(Scotland) Stuart Duff	28	(Scotland) Aberdeen	Free
(Israel) Gil Blumstein	20	(Israel) Hapoel Be'er Sheva	Free
(England) Max Johnson	19	(England) Newcastle United	Undisclosed
(Scotland) Kevin McCann	22	(Scotland) Hibernian	Loan
(Republic of Ireland) Aaron Doran	19	(England) Blackburn Rovers	Loan
(Scotland) Alex MacDonald	20	(England) Burnley	Loan

Transfers Out
Player	Age*	To	Fee
(England) Robert Eagle	23	(England) Grimsby Town	Free
(England) Dan Stratford	25	(England) Hereford United	Free
(Scotland) Kyle Allison	20	(Scotland) Dunfermline Athletic	Free
(Scotland) Jamie Duff	21	(Scotland) Elgin City	Free
(France) Lionel Djebi-Zadi	28	(Réunion) Saint Louisienne	Free
(Scotland) Roy McBain	36	(Scotland) Brechin City	Loan

== Captains ==
No.	P	Name	Country	No. games	Notes
9	FW	Richie Foran	(Republic of Ireland)		Club captain

Last updated: 25 March 2011
Source: Competitive match reports.
Competitive matches only
Matches started as captain only
Country: FIFA nationality; No.: Squad number; P: Position; Name: Player name; No. Games: Number of games started as captain.

=== Hat-tricks ===
Player	Competition	Score	Opponent	Date
(Republic of Ireland) Adam Rooney	Scottish Premier League	4–2	Hibernian	20 November 2010
