= 2007–08 Inverness Caledonian Thistle F.C. season =

Scottish football club season

Inverness Caledonian Thistle F.C.
2007–08 season
- Manager: Craig Brewster
- Scottish Premier League: 9th
- Scottish Cup: 4th round
- Scottish League Cup: Quarter-final
- Top goalscorer: League: Don Cowie (9); All: Marius Niculae (10)
- Highest home attendance: 7,753 vs. Rangers, 20 January 2008
- Lowest home attendance: 3,420 vs. Kilmarnock, 19 April 2008
- Average home league attendance: 4,753

The 2007–08 season was Inverness Caledonian Thistle's fourth in the Scottish Premier League and 14th since the merger that created the club. They also competed in the Scottish League Cup and the Scottish Cup.

== Scottish Premier League ==
Caley Thistle finished 9th of 12 teams in the SPL, on 43 points from 38 matches. They managed only a disappointing −11 goal differential, from 51 goals scored and 62 allowed. It was a mixed season for statistics, as this tied the club's record for goals scored in an SPL season, set in 2004–05, but also demolished their record for SPL goals conceded by 14. But overall, it could be called a poor season for the Caley, with the lowest total points and lowest finishing league standing since their promotion in 2004.

The exception to this poor form, and the main reason for the team's survival in the SPL, was the month of December. A streak that included wins against Hearts and Celtic earned Craig Brewster Manager of the Month and Marius Niculae Player of the Month honors.

== Scottish Cup ==
To go along with the lackluster league season was a short and poor Scottish Cup. Caley Thistle entered the tournament in the fourth round, and faced Hibernian at Easter Road. Dean Shiels scored a hat trick and sunk Caley's hopes for a cup run at the first possible point as the match finished 3–0 to Hibs.

== League Cup ==
The League Cup provided a bit more positive news for Caley Thistle fans, as the club reached the quarterfinals for the second time in three seasons, on the strength of a 4–1 win over Arbroath and a 3–0 win over Gretna. The run stopped abruptly, however, away to Aberdeen, who beat Caley Thistle 4–1 on the strength of another hat trick (albeit including two penalties), this time from Barry Nicholson.

== Results ==
All the results of the regular matches

=== Scottish Premier League ===
==== League table ====
| Pos | Team | Pld | W | D | L | GF | GA | GD | Pts | Qualification or relegation (Note: Teams played each other three times (33 matches), before the league split into two groups (the top six and the bottom six) for the last five matches.) |
|---|---|---|---|---|---|---|---|---|---|---|
| 7 | Falkirk | 38 | 13 | 10 | 15 | 45 | 49 | −4 | 49 | |
| 8 | Heart of Midlothian | 38 | 13 | 9 | 16 | 47 | 55 | −8 | 48 | |
| 9 | Inverness Caledonian Thistle | 38 | 13 | 4 | 21 | 51 | 62 | −11 | 43 | |
| 10 | St Mirren | 38 | 10 | 11 | 17 | 26 | 54 | −28 | 41 | |
| 11 | Kilmarnock | 38 | 10 | 10 | 18 | 39 | 52 | −13 | 40 | |

Source: Scottish Professional Football League
Rules for classification: 1) Points; 2) Goal difference; 3) Goals scored

==== Friendlies ====
| 11 July 2007 Friendly | Inverness Caledonian Thistle | 2 – 0 | Qatar U-21 | Montecatini Terme |
| | Tokely 47'; McDonald 81' | Report |

| 14 July 2007 Friendly | Inverness Caledonian Thistle | 2 – 1 | (Romania) Universitatea Craiova U21 | Montecatini Terme |
| | Wood 35'; McDonald 46' | Report | ? (?) |

| 17 July 2007 Friendly | Elgin City | 0–3 | Inverness Caledonian Thistle | Elgin |
| | | | Wilson 38', Rankin 46', Hart 62' | Stadium: Borough Briggs |

| 18 July 2007 Friendly | Clachnacuddin | 0–2 | Inverness Caledonian Thistle | Inverness |
| | | | Sutherland 76', Wood 86' (pen.) | Stadium: Grant Street Park |

| 21 July 2007 Darren Still testimonial | Keith | 1–5 | Inverness Caledonian Thistle | Keith |
| | ? (?) | | Wilson 42', McDonald 45', 64', Rankin 85', 88' | Stadium: Kynoch Park |

| 22 July 2007 Steven Park testimonial | Inverurie Loco Works | 2–5 | Inverness Caledonian Thistle | Inverurie |
| | ? (?) | | Paatelainen 28', Wyness 43', 63', McAllister 50', Wood 64' | Stadium: Harlaw Park |

| 25 July 2007 Friendly | Peterhead | 2–1 | Inverness Caledonian Thistle | Peterhead |
| | Bavidge (?), (?) | | Hart 45' | Stadium: Balmoor Stadium |

| 28 July 2007 Friendly | Ross County | 1–2 | Inverness Caledonian Thistle | Dingwall |
| | Barrowman 34' | | Munro 69', McCaffrey 72' | Stadium: Victoria Park |

==== League ====
| 4 August 2007 | Inverness Caledonian Thistle | 0–3 | Rangers | Caledonian Stadium |
| 12:30 | | | Ferguson 16', 90'; Novo 64' | Attendance: 7,711; Referee: Clarke |

| 11 August 2007 | Motherwell | 2–1 | Inverness Caledonian Thistle | Fir Park |
| 15:00 | O'Donnell 85'; McCormack 90' | | Tokely 82' | Attendance: 4,259; Referee: Freeland |

| 18 August 2007 | St Mirren | 2–1 | Inverness Caledonian Thistle | Love Street |
| 15:00 | Miranda 19'; Corcoran 55' | | Cowie 58' | Attendance: 3,309; Referee: Collum |

| 25 August 2007 | Inverness Caledonian Thistle | 0–3 | Dundee United | Caledonian Stadium |
| 15:00 | | | Dillon 46'; Robson 58', 81' | Attendance: 4,178; Referee: Underhill |

| 1 September 2007 | Hibernian | 1–0 | Inverness Caledonian Thistle | Easter Road |
| 15:00 | Fletcher 2' | | | Attendance: 13,258; Referee: Smith |

| 15 September 2007 | Celtic | 5–0 | Inverness Caledonian Thistle | Celtic Park |
| 15:00 | Vennegoor of Hesselink 15', 59'; Donati 41'; Nakamura 56'; McGuire 70' (o.g.) | | | Attendance: 56,020; Referee: Thomson |

| 22 September 2007 | Inverness Caledonian Thistle | 2–1 | Hearts | Caledonian Stadium |
| 15:00 | Wyness 64'; Brewster 90' | | Black 34' (o.g.) | Attendance: 4,918; Referee: Tumilty |

| 29 September 2007 | Inverness Caledonian Thistle | 4–2 | Falkirk | Caledonian Stadium |
| 15:00 | Wyness 7', 54'; Duncan 18'; Black 32' | | Milne 28'; Arfield 47' | Attendance: 4,011; Referee: Somers |

| 6 October 2007 | Kilmarnock | 2–2 | Inverness Caledonian Thistle | Rugby Park |
| 15:00 | Koudou 1'; Nish 56' | | Ford 22' (o.g.); Cowie 61' | Attendance: 4,456; Referee: Brines |

| 21 October 2007 | Inverness Caledonian Thistle | 1–2 | Aberdeen | Caledonian Stadium |
| 14:00 | Wyness 58' | | Young 8'; Tokely 62' (o.g.) | Referee: Smith |

| 27 October 2007 | Gretna | 0–4 | Inverness Caledonian Thistle | Fir Park |
| 15:00 | | | Wyness 2'; Cowie 31'; Wilson 73'; McBain 75' | Attendance: 1,096; Referee: McCurry |

| 3 November 2007 | Rangers | 2–0 | Inverness Caledonian Thistle | Ibrox Stadium |
| 15:00 | Boyd 1'; Cuéllar 63' | | | Attendance: 48,898; Referee: Collum |

| 10 November 2007 | Inverness Caledonian Thistle | 0–3 | Motherwell | Caledonian Stadium |
| 15:00 | | | Clarkson 15', 53'; Smith 87' | Attendance: 3,608 |

| 24 November 2007 | Inverness Caledonian Thistle | 1–0 | St Mirren | Caledonian Stadium |
| 15:00 | Cowie 6' | | | Attendance: 3,699; Referee: Allan |

| 1 December 2007 | Dundee United | 0–1 | Inverness Caledonian Thistle | Tannadice Stadium |
| 15:00 | | | Black 20' | Attendance: 5845; Referee: Brines |

| 8 December 2007 | Inverness Caledonian Thistle | 2–0 | Hibernian | Caledonian Stadium |
| 15:00 | Niculae 42', 78' | | | Attendance: 4224; Referee: Clark |

| 12 December 2007 | Inverness Caledonian Thistle | 3–2 | Celtic | Caledonian Stadium |
| 14:00 | Rankin 41' (pen.); Proctor 57', (red card) 68'; Cowie 61' | | Vennegoor of Hesselink 24', 26' | Attendance: 7004 |

| 22 December 2007 | Heart of Midlothian | 2–3 | Inverness Caledonian Thistle | Tynecastle Park |
| 15:00 | Berra 62'; Kurskis (yellow card) 86' (yellow-red card); Velicka 88' (pen.) | | Duncan 22'; Rankin 52' (pen.); Bayne 90+3' | Attendance: 16202 |

| 26 December 2007 | Falkirk | 1–0 | Inverness Caledonian Thistle | Falkirk Stadium |
| 15:00 | Aafjes 34' | | | Attendance: 5265 |

| 29 December 2007 | Inverness Caledonian Thistle | 3–1 | Kilmarnock | Caledonian Stadium |
| 15:00 | Niculae 42', 76'; Cowie 52' | | Nish 87' | Attendance: 4169 |

| 2 January 2008 | Aberdeen | 1–0 | Inverness Caledonian Thistle | Pittodrie Stadium |
| 15:00 | Nicholson 82' (pen.) | | | Attendance: 13327 |

| 5 January 2008 | Inverness Caledonian Thistle | 3–0 | Gretna | Caledonian Stadium |
| 15:00 | Niculae 34', 42'; Rankin 39' (pen.) | | | Attendance: 3919 |

| 20 January 2008 | Inverness Caledonian Thistle | 0–1 | Rangers | Caledonian Stadium |
| 14:00 | | | Darcheville 89' | Attendance: 7753 |

| 9 February 2008 | St Mirren | 1–1 | Inverness Caledonian Thistle | St Mirren Park |
| 15:00 | Mehmet 75' | | Munro 27' | Attendance: 3609 |

| 16 February 2008 | Inverness Caledonian Thistle | 1–1 | Dundee United | Caledonian Stadium |
| 15:00 | Paatelainen 84' | | Buaben 68' | Attendance: 4087 |

| 20 February 2008 | Motherwell | 3–1 | Inverness Caledonian Thistle | Fir Park |
| 19:45 | Clarkson 7', 42'; Porter 10' | | Cowie 19' | Attendance: 4526 |

| 23 February 2008 | Hibernian | 2–0 | Inverness Caledonian Thistle | Easter Road |
| 15:00 | Nish 3'; Fletcher 5' | | | Attendance: 12552 |

| 27 February 2008 | Celtic | 2–1 | Inverness Caledonian Thistle | Celtic Park |
| 19:45 | McDonald 45'; Samaras 61' | | Niculae 70' | Attendance: 56787 |

| 1 March 2008 | Inverness Caledonian Thistle | 0–3 | Heart of Midlothian | Caledonian Stadium |
| 15:00 | | | Karypidis 22'; Elliot 33', 47' | Attendance: 4489 |

| 15 March 2008 | Inverness Caledonian Thistle | 0–1 | Falkirk | Caledonian Stadium |
| 15:00 | | | Clarke 86' | Attendance: 4012 |

| 22 March 2008 | Kilmarnock | 4–1 | Inverness Caledonian Thistle | Rugby Park |
| 15:00 | Wright 37'; Bryson 50', 57'; Flannigan 64' | | Black 13' | Attendance: 5100 |

| 29 March 2008 | Inverness Caledonian Thistle | 3–4 | Aberdeen | Caledonian Stadium |
| 15:00 | Bus 20' (o.g.); Duncan 40', (yellow card) 46' (yellow-red card); McBain 57'; Munro (red card) 90+10' | | Aluko 7'; Nicholson 45'; Miller 53'; Maguire 90+3' | Attendance: 5655 |

| 5 April 2008 | Gretna | 1–2 | Inverness Caledonian Thistle | Fir Park |
| 15:00 | Barr 80' | | McBain 71'; Cowie 73' | Attendance: 431 |

| 19 April 2008 | Inverness Caledonian Thistle | 3–0 | Kilmarnock | Caledonian Stadium |
| 15:00 | Imrie 10'; Lilley 71' (o.g.); Niculae 79' | | | Attendance: 3420 |

| 26 April 2008 | Heart of Midlothian | 1–0 | Inverness Caledonian Thistle | Tynecastle Park |
| 15:00 | Glen 80' | | | Attendance: 15423 |

| 4 May 2008 | Inverness Caledonian Thistle | 6–1 | Gretna | Caledonian Stadium |
| 14:00 | Imrie 1'; McAllister 24'; Wilson 51'; Cowie 70'; Tokely 88'; Vigurs 90+1' | | Hogg 26' | Attendance: 3639 |

| 10 May 2008 | Falkirk | 2–1 | Inverness Caledonian Thistle | Falkirk Stadium |
| 15:00 | Higdon 28'; Finnigan 68' | | Wilson 90' (pen.) | Attendance: 5631 |

| 17 May 2008 | Inverness Caledonian Thistle | 0–0 | St Mirren | Caledonian Stadium |
| 15:00 | Proctor (red card) 54' | | | Attendance: 3783 |

=== Scottish League Cup ===
| Round | Date | Opponent | H/A | Score | ICT Scorer(s) | Attendance |
|---|---|---|---|---|---|---|
| R2 | 28 August | Arbroath | H | 3–1 | Niculae (2), Wyness | 1,246 |
| R3 | 25 September | Gretna | H | 3–0 | Bayne, Wilson, Wyness | 1,717 |
| R4 | 31 October | Aberdeen | A | 1–4 | Bayne | 7,270 |

=== Scottish Cup ===
| 12 January 2008 Fourth round | Hibernian | 3–0 | Inverness Caledonian Thistle | Easter Road |
| 15:00 | Shiels 5', 53', 84'; Morais (yellow card) 88' (yellow-red card) | | McGuire (yellow card) 88' (yellow-red card) | Attendance: 9622; Referee: Conroy} |

== Club Records Set ==
- (+) Tied – Most SPL goals scored: 51 (also scored 51 in 2004–05)
- (−) Lowest SPL finish: 9th (previous was 8th in 2004–05 and 2006–07)
- (−) Least SPL points: 43 (previous was 44 in 2004–05)
- (−) Worst SPL goal difference: −11 (previous was −6 in 2004–05 and 2006–07)
- (−) Most SPL goals allowed: 62 (previous was 48 in 2006–07)

== Transfers in ==
| Date | Name | Moving from | Fee |
|---|---|---|---|
| 8 May 2007 | (Scotland) Ally Ridgers | (Scotland) Clachnacuddin | Free |
| 1 July 2007 | (Scotland) Don Cowie | (Scotland) Ross County | Free |
| 4 July 2007 | (England) Dean McDonald | (England) Gillingham | Undisclosed |
| 17 July 2007 | (Romania) Marius Niculae | (Germany) Mainz 05 | Free |
| 14 August 2007 | (Scotland) Steven Watt | (Wales) Swansea City | Loan |
| 31 August 2007 | (Poland) Zbigniew Małkowski | (Scotland) Hibernian | Loan |
| 31 August 2007 | (Scotland) Phil McGuire | (Scotland) Dunfermline Athletic | Loan |
| 31 August 2007 | (Scotland) David Proctor | (Scotland) Dundee United | Free |
| 31 January 2008 | (Scotland) Dougie Imrie | (Scotland) Clyde | Undisclosed |

== Transfers out ==
| Date | Name | Moving to | Fee |
|---|---|---|---|
| 1 June 2007 | (Scotland) Stuart Golabek | (Scotland) Ross County | Free |
| 28 June 2007 | (Scotland) Craig Dargo | (Scotland) St Mirren | Free |
| 1 July 2007 | (Scotland) Darren Dods | (Scotland) Dundee United | Free |
| 31 August 2007 | (Scotland) Ally Ridgers | (Scotland) Elgin City | Loan |
| 31 August 2007 | (Scotland) Zander Sutherland | (Scotland) Elgin City | Loan |
| 1 January 2008 | (Scotland) Alan Morgan | (Scotland) Kilmarnock | Free |
| 17 January 2008 | (Scotland) John Rankin | (Scotland) Hibernian | £110,000 |
| 29 April 2008 | (Scotland) Stuart McCaffrey | (Scotland) St Johnstone | Free |
