= 2000 Scottish League Cup final =

- Event: 1999–2000 Scottish League Cup
Aberdeen	Celtic
0	2
- Date: 19 March 2000
- Venue: Hampden Park, Glasgow
- Referee: Kenny Clark
- Attendance: 50,073

The 2000 Scottish League Cup final was played on 19 March 2000 at Hampden Park in Glasgow and was the final of the 53rd Scottish League Cup. The final was contested by Aberdeen and Celtic. Celtic won the match 2–0, thanks to goals from Vidar Riseth and Tommy Johnson.

This was the first League Cup final in many years to be played in March, as previous finals had taken place in November; this format continued until the 2016–17 season (coincidentally the same teams would also contest that final).

The match was something of a Scandinavian affair, with Aberdeen's Danish manager Ebbe Skovdahl selecting three Norwegian players (one of whom, Thomas Solberg, was dismissed); Celtic fielded another Norwegian (Riseth, who opened the scoring) plus a Swede and a Dane. The Glasgow club's famous Swedish striker of the time, Henrik Larsson, was absent recovering from a broken leg.

== Match details ==
19 March 2000

Aberdeen	0–2	Celtic
	Report	Riseth 15'; Johnson 58'

Hampden Park, Glasgow
Attendance: 50,073
Referee: Kenny Clark

=== Teams ===
ABERDEEN :
GK	1	(Scotland) Jim Leighton (c)
RB	2	(Scotland) Mark Perry
CB	15	(Scotland) Russell Anderson
CB	5	(Norway) Thomas Solberg	(red card) 61'
LB	30	(Scotland) Jamie McAllister
RM	14	(Scotland) Paul Bernard
CM	8	(Scotland) Eoin Jess	(substituted off) 74'
CM	26	(Norway) Cato Guntveit	(substituted off) 45'
LM	12	(Scotland) Andy Dow
CF	47	(Morocco) Hicham Zerouali	(substituted off) 53'
CF	46	(Norway) Arild Stavrum
Substitutes:
MF	43	(Morocco) Rachid Belabed	(substituted in) 45'
MF	10	(Germany) Andreas Mayer	(substituted in) 74'
FW	9	(Scotland) Robbie Winters	(substituted in) 53'
Manager:
(Denmark) Ebbe Skovdahl

CELTIC :
GK	1	(Scotland) Jonathan Gould
RB	4	(Scotland) Jackie McNamara
CB	35	(Sweden) Johan Mjällby
CB	2	(Scotland) Tom Boyd (c)
LB	3	(France) Stephane Mahe
RM	30	(Norway) Vidar Riseth 15'
CM	11	(Denmark) Morten Wieghorst
CM	19	(Bulgaria) Stiliyan Petrov
LM	25	(Slovakia) Ľubomír Moravčík	(substituted off) 74'
CF	12	(England) Tommy Johnson (substituted off) 90' (goal) 58'
CF	36	(Australia) Mark Viduka
Substitutes:
GK	21	(Scotland) Stewart Kerr
DF	6	(England) Alan Stubbs	(substituted in) 74'
MF	10	(Israel) Eyal Berkovic (substituted in) 90'
Manager:
(Scotland) Kenny Dalglish
