= 1999–2000 Scottish Premier League =

94th season of top-tier football league in Scotland

Scottish Premier League
- Season: 1999–2000
- Dates: 31 July 1999 – 21 May 2000
- Champions: Rangers; 2nd Premier League title 49th Scottish title
- Relegated: No relegation
- Champions League: Rangers
- UEFA Cup: Celtic; Heart of Midlothian; Aberdeen (via Scottish Cup)
- Matches: 180
- Goals: 528 (2.93 per match)
- Top goalscorer: Mark Viduka (25)
- Biggest home win: Celtic 7–0 Aberdeen (16 October)
- Biggest away win: Dundee 1–7 Rangers (27 February); Aberdeen 0–6 Celtic (11 December)
- Highest scoring: Motherwell 5–6 Aberdeen (20 October)
- Highest attendance: 60,253, Celtic 3–0 St Johnstone (7 August)
- Lowest attendance: 4,039, Dundee 0–0 Kilmarnock (26 January)
- Average attendance: 17,944 ( 633)

The 1999–2000 Scottish Premier League (known as the 1999–2000 Bank of Scotland Premier League for sponsorship reasons) was the second season of the Scottish Premier League, the top level of football in Scotland. It began in on 31 July 1999 and concluded on 21 May 2000.

Rangers, the defending champions, retained their title on 22 April 2000, after their nearest challengers Celtic drew 1–1 with Hibernian.

== Teams ==
A total of 10 teams competed in the league, the top 9 sides from the 1998–99 Scottish Premier League and the champions of the 1998–99 Scottish First Division.

Hibernian were promoted to the league after winning the 1998–99 First Division by a 23-point margin. They replaced Dunfermline Athletic who were relegated after a three-season stint in the top flight, finishing bottom of the league the previous season.

=== Stadia and locations ===
Location of clubs in 1999–2000 Scottish Premier League

Aberdeen	Celtic	Dundee
Pittodrie Stadium	Celtic Park	Dens Park
Capacity: 20,866	Capacity: 60,411	Capacity: 11,506
Dundee United	Heart of Midlothian	Hibernian
Tannadice Park	Tynecastle Park	Easter Road
Capacity: 14,223	Capacity: 17,420	Capacity: 16,531
Kilmarnock	Motherwell	
Rugby Park	Fir Park	
Capacity: 17,889	Capacity: 13,677	
Rangers	St Johnstone	
Ibrox Stadium	McDiarmid Park	
Capacity: 50,817	Capacity: 10,696	

=== Personnel and kits ===
Team	Manager	Kit manufacturer	Kit sponsor
Aberdeen	(Denmark) Ebbe Skovdahl	Puma	Atlantic Telecom
Celtic	(Scotland) Kenny Dalglish (interim)	Umbro	ntl:
Dundee	(Scotland) Jocky Scott	Xara	Ceramic Tile Warehouse
Dundee United	(Scotland) Paul Sturrock	Olympic Sports	Telewest
Heart of Midlothian	(Scotland) Jim Jefferies	Olympic Sports	Strongbow
Hibernian	(Scotland) Alex McLeish	Le Coq Sportif	Carlsberg
Kilmarnock	(Scotland) Bobby Williamson	Puma	JJB Sports
Motherwell	(Scotland) Billy Davies	Xara	Motorola
Rangers	(Netherlands) Dick Advocaat	Nike	ntl:
St Johnstone	(Scotland) Sandy Clark	Xara	Scottish Hydro Electric

==== Managerial changes ====
Team	Outgoing manager	Date of vacancy	Manner of departure	Position in table	Incoming manager	Date of appointment
Aberdeen	(Scotland) Paul Hegarty	24 May 1999	Caretaker spell ended	Pre-season	(Denmark) Ebbe Skovdahl	1 July 1999
Celtic	(Slovakia) Jozef Vengloš	1 June 1999	Mutual consent	Pre-season	(England) John Barnes	10 June 1999
Celtic	(England) John Barnes	10 February 2000	Sacked	2nd	(Scotland) Kenny Dalglish (caretaker)	10 February 2000

== Overview ==
The 1999–2000 Scottish Premier League was won by Rangers for the second successive year, finishing 21 points ahead of nearest rivals Celtic. As champions, Rangers qualified for the Champions League while Celtic and third-placed Hearts qualified for the UEFA Cup.

As the SPL was being expanded to 12 teams, there was going to be a three-way playoff between the team finishing bottom and the second and third placed teams in the First Division, but due to Falkirk's stadium (Brockville Park) having fewer than the SPL minimum required 10,000 seats, the playoff was scrapped, bottom-placed Aberdeen remained in the top flight and Dunfermline were promoted automatically as the First Division runners-up. Aberdeen appeared in both the League Cup and Scottish Cup final, but lost both to Celtic and Rangers, respectively. However, as Scottish Cup runners-up, they also qualified for the following season's UEFA Cup.

Celtic entered the season under new management with former Liverpool player John Barnes taking charge in June 1999. It proved to be a brief and unsuccessful reign, however, after being sacked in February 2000, ten points behind Rangers in the league, and in the wake of a Scottish Cup defeat to First Division Inverness Caledonian Thistle.

On 20 October 1999, Aberdeen and Motherwell played out a match which finished in a 6–5 victory for Aberdeen at Fir Park. This was the record for the highest-scoring match in Scottish Premier League history, until Motherwell and Hibernian played out a 6–6 draw in May 2010, also at Fir Park.

Rangers secured the league title on 22 April 2000, after Celtic drew 1–1 with Hibernian at Celtic Park, leaving Celtic with a 17-point deficit with only 5 matches left to play.

== League table ==
Pos	Team	Pld	W	D	L	GF	GA	GD	Pts	Qualification or relegation
1	Rangers (C)	36	28	6	2	96	26	+70	90	Qualification for the Champions League second qualifying round
2	Celtic	36	21	6	9	90	38	+52	69	Qualification for the UEFA Cup qualifying round
3	Heart of Midlothian	36	15	9	12	47	40	+7	54	Qualification for the UEFA Cup qualifying round
4	Motherwell	36	14	10	12	49	63	−14	52	
5	St Johnstone	36	10	12	14	36	44	−8	42	
6	Hibernian	36	10	11	15	49	61	−12	41	
7	Dundee	36	12	5	19	45	64	−19	41	
8	Dundee United	36	11	6	19	34	57	−23	39	
9	Kilmarnock	36	8	13	15	38	52	−14	37	
10	Aberdeen	36	9	6	21	44	83	−39	33	Qualification for the UEFA Cup qualifying round (Note: Since Rangers, the winners of the 1999–2000 Scottish Cup, already qualified for the UEFA Champions League, Aberdeen, the losing finalist, earned a spot in the 2000–01 UEFA Cup. As the bottom team, Aberdeen were also due to take part in a three-team play-off with Dunfermline Athletic and Falkirk, but as Falkirk's stadium did not meet SPL criteria, the play-off did not take place.)

Updated to match(es) played on end of season. Source: Scottish Professional Football League
Rules for classification: 1) Points; 2) Goal difference; 3) Goals scored
(C) Champions

== Results ==
=== Matches 1–18 ===
During matches 1–18 each team plays every other team twice (home and away).

Home \ Away	ABE	CEL	DND	DUN	HOM	HIB	KIL	MOT	RAN	STJ
Aberdeen		0–5	0–2	1–2	3–1	2–2	2–2	1–1	1–5	0–3
Celtic	7–0		6–2	4–1	4–0	4–0	5–1	0–1	1–1	3–0
Dundee	1–3	1–2		0–2	1–0	3–4	0–0	0–1	2–3	1–2
Dundee United	3–1	2–1	2–1		0–2	3–1	0–0	0–2	0–4	1–0
Heart of Midlothian	3–0	1–2	4–0	3–0		0–3	2–2	1–1	0–4	1–1
Hibernian	2–0	0–2	5–2	3–2	1–1		0–3	2–2	0–1	0–1
Kilmarnock	2–0	0–1	0–2	1–1	2–2	0–2		0–1	1–1	1–2
Motherwell	5–6	3–2	0–2	2–2	2–1	2–2	0–4		1–5	1–0
Rangers	3–0	4–2	1–2	4–1	1–0	2–0	2–1	4–1		3–1
St Johnstone	1–1	1–2	0–1	0–1	1–4	1–1	2–0	1–1	1–1	

Source: Soccerbase
Legend: Blue = home team win; Yellow = draw; Red = away team win.

=== Matches 19–36 ===
During matches 19–36 each team plays every other team a further two times (home and away).

Home \ Away	ABE	CEL	DND	DUN	HOM	HIB	KIL	MOT	RAN	STJ
Aberdeen		0–6	0–1	3–1	1–2	4–0	5–1	2–1	1–1	2–1
Celtic	5–1		2–2	2–0	2–3	1–1	4–2	4–0	0–1	4–1
Dundee	0–2	0–3		3–0	0–0	1–0	1–2	4–1	1–7	1–1
Dundee United	1–1	0–1	1–0		0–1	0–0	2–2	1–2	0–2	0–1
Heart of Midlothian	3–0	1–0	2–0	1–2		2–1	0–0	0–0	1–2	0–0
Hibernian	1–0	2–1	1–2	1–0	3–1		2–2	2–2	2–2	3–3
Kilmarnock	1–0	1–1	2–2	1–0	0–1	1–0		0–2	0–2	3–2
Motherwell	1–0	1–1	0–3	1–3	0–2	2–0	2–0		2–0	2–1
Rangers	5–0	4–0	3–0	3–0	1–0	5–2	1–0	6–2		0–0
St Johnstone	2–1	0–0	2–1	2–0	0–1	1–0	0–0	1–1	0–2	

Source: Soccerbase
Legend: Blue = home team win; Yellow = draw; Red = away team win.

== Top scorers ==
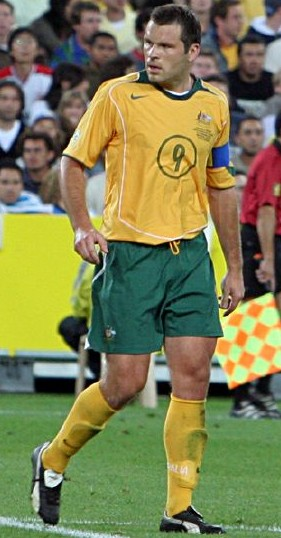
Celtic's Mark Viduka was the SPL's top scorer in season 1999–2000.

Player	Club	Goals
(Australia) Mark Viduka	Celtic	25
(Scotland) Billy Dodds	Dundee United/Rangers	19
(Germany) Jörg Albertz	Rangers	17
(England) Rod Wallace	Rangers	16
(Scotland) Gary McSwegan	Hearts	13
(Scotland) Willie Falconer	Dundee	12
(Scotland) Mark Burchill	Celtic	11
(Scotland) Kenny Miller	Hibernian	11
(Scotland) John Spencer	Motherwell	11
(England) Nathan Lowndes	St Johnstone	10
(Netherlands) Michael Mols	Rangers	9
(England) Tommy Johnson	Celtic	9

Source: SPL official website

== Awards ==
- Player awards

Award	Winner	Club
PFA Players' Player of the Year	(Australia) Mark Viduka	Celtic
PFA Young Player of the Year	(Scotland) Kenny Miller	Hibernian
SFWA Footballer of the Year	(Scotland) Barry Ferguson	Rangers

- Manager awards

Award	Winner	Club
SFWA Manager of the Year	(Netherlands) Dick Advocaat	Rangers

== Attendances ==
The average attendances for SPL clubs during the 1999/00 season are shown below:

Team	Average
Celtic	54,440
Rangers	48,116
Hearts	14,246
Aberdeen	12,813
Hibernian	11,870
Kilmarnock	9,419
Dundee United	8,186
Motherwell	7,297
Dundee	6,938
St Johnstone	6,117

Source: SPL official website
