= Phil McGuire (footballer) =

Scottish footballer and manager

Personal information
- Full name: Philip McGuire
- Date of birth: 4 March 1980 (age 46)
- Place of birth: Glasgow, Scotland
- Positions: Centre back; midfielder

Team information
- Current team: Carnoustie Panmure (manager)

Youth career
- 1996–1999: Aberdeen
- 1998–1999: → Dyce Juniors (loan)

Senior career*
| Years | Team | Apps | (Gls) |
| 1999–2005 | Aberdeen | 153 | (10) |
| 2005–2006 | Doncaster Rovers | 11 | (0) |
| 2006–2008 | Dunfermline Athletic | 25 | (1) |
| 2007–2009 | → Inverness Caledonian Thistle (loan) | 35 | (1) |
| 2009 | Formartine United | | |
| 2010 | Arbroath | 7 | (0) |
| 2011–2012 | Lochee United | | |
| 2012–2013 | Montrose | 2 | (0) |
| 2013 | Jeanfield Swifts | | |
| 2013–2015 | St Andrews United | | |
| Total | | 233 | (12) |

International career
| 2000–2002 | Scotland U21 | 4 | (0) |
| 2002–2005 | Scotland B | 2 | (0) |

Managerial career
- 2014–2015: St Andrews United
- 2017–2018: Brechin Victoria
- 2018–: Carnoustie Panmure
- * Club domestic league appearances and goals

Philip McGuire (born 4 March 1980) is a Scottish former professional footballer. He is currently the manager of Carnoustie Panmure in the SJFA East Superleague.

== Playing career ==
=== Aberdeen ===
McGuire, a central defender or sometime midfielder, started his career with Aberdeen where he made 181 appearances, scoring 10 goals. He joined Aberdeen in 1996 and came through the ranks into the first team. McGuire was part of the 2000 Scottish Cup Final and 2000 Scottish League Cup Final teams, both of which Aberdeen lost. In 2001–02 and 2002–03 he was voted into the SPL Team of the Year. In 2002 there was major speculation that McGuire would leave Aberdeen to join Celtic, but after discussions the deal broke down. McGuire then signed a three-year deal in October 2002 to remain at Aberdeen.

=== Doncaster Rovers ===
McGuire joined Doncaster Rovers in July 2005 on a free transfer. McGuire played 18 games for the English League One club. He was injured in a match with Nottingham Forest in which he missed four months of the season. He managed to come back early and captained the reserves to the League and Cup double on his comeback trail.

=== Return to Scotland ===
McGuire returned to Scotland in July 2006, signing a two-year deal with Dunfermline Athletic, who paid a six figure fee to take him back. McGuire helped Dunfermline reach the 2007 Scottish Cup Final which they lost to Celtic. Dunfermline were relegated from the SPL that season. On 31 August 2007, he signed for Inverness Caledonian Thistle on loan and became one of the first players to move back up the divisions on a loan agreement until 13 January. After the loan spell expired, McGuire signed a 2 1/2-year deal with Inverness after Caley Thistle and the Pars agreed a fee.

McGuire was a regular at Inverness and finished the 2007-08 season in a respected position. In October 2008, with Inverness Caledonian Thistle going well in the League campaign, McGuire suffered an ankle injury which ruled him out for nine weeks. McGuire returned early to help Inverness Caledonian Thistle, who at this stage had slipped down to bottom of the table. Within weeks, Inverness parted company with manager Craig Brewster. Terry Butcher and Maurice Malpas took over the mantle at Inverness Caledonian Thistle. McGuire found his first team games rare and he decided at the end of that season to leave the club, which had been relegated to the First Division, despite having a year remaining on his contract.

McGuire turned down several clubs in Britain as he was looking to move abroad and explore different options with coaching and options outside football. He almost joined the New York Red Bulls in the MLS as a coach but decided it was the wrong time. On Friday, 25 September 2009 he signed for Formartine United on a one-year deal to help raise the profile of the new club and raise the awareness of the Highland League. McGuire teamed up with the Scottish Sun to write a weekly diary about his time with the club and created media interest in the small football club. McGuire left Formartine United at the end of January 2010. He finished off the season with Arbroath. McGuire headed to Cyprus with AEK Larnaca and was offered a two-year deal, but after a short period of time returned to the UK due to financial problems with the club.

In 2011, McGuire signed for Lochee United. The following season, McGuire then signed for Montrose for the 2012-13 season.

In August 2013, McGuire signed for Jeanfield Swifts in the East Region Premier League as a Player/Assistant Manager. In October 2013, McGuire transferred to St Andrews United in the East Region Super League as a Player/Coach.

=== International ===
During his Aberdeen spell, McGuire was capped at under-21 and B level. He was selected for Scotland squads by Berti Vogts, but did not play in a full international.

== Managerial career ==
In June 2014 McGuire was named manager of Junior team St Andrews United. He was sacked from this position on 5 December 2015. He was also part of the St Andrews University F.C. coaching staff.

McGuire took up the managerial position at Brechin Victoria in June 2017, before joining Carnoustie Panmure in September 2018.

== Career statistics ==
=== Club ===
Appearances and goals by club, season and competition
| Club | Season | League | | | National cup | | League cup | | Europe | | Other | | Total | |
| Club | Season | Division | Apps | Goals | Apps | Goals | Apps | Goals | Apps | Goals | Apps | Goals | Apps | Goals |
|---|---|---|---|---|---|---|---|---|---|---|---|---|---|---|
| Aberdeen | 1999–2000 | Scottish Premier League | 3 | 0 | 0 | 0 | 0 | 0 | 0 | 0 | – | | 3 | 0 |
| Aberdeen | 2000–01 | Scottish Premier League | 29 | 0 | 3 | 0 | 1 | 0 | 2 | 0 | – | | 35 | 0 |
| Aberdeen | 2001–02 | Scottish Premier League | 38 | 3 | 3 | 0 | 2 | 0 | 0 | 0 | – | | 43 | 3 |
| Aberdeen | 2002–03 | Scottish Premier League | 36 | 5 | 3 | 0 | 2 | 0 | 4 | 0 | – | | 45 | 5 |
| Aberdeen | 2003–04 | Scottish Premier League | 17 | 2 | 3 | 0 | 1 | 0 | 0 | 0 | – | | 21 | 2 |
| Aberdeen | 2004–05 | Scottish Premier League | 30 | 0 | 2 | 0 | 2 | 0 | 0 | 0 | – | | 34 | 0 |
| Aberdeen | Total | | 153 | 10 | 14 | 0 | 8 | 0 | 6 | 0 | 0 | 0 | 181 | 10 |
| Doncaster Rovers | 2005–06 | League One | 11 | 0 | 0 | 0 | 2 | 0 | – | | 1 | 0 | 14 | 0 |
| Dunfermline Athletic | 2006–07 | Scottish Premier League | 24 | 1 | 5 | 1 | 2 | 0 | 0 | 0 | – | | 31 | 2 |
| Dunfermline Athletic | 2007–08 | Scottish First Division | 1 | 0 | 0 | 0 | 0 | 0 | – | | – | | 1 | 0 |
| Dunfermline Athletic | 2008–09 | Scottish First Division | 0 | 0 | 0 | 0 | 0 | 0 | – | | – | | 0 | 0 |
| Dunfermline Athletic | Total | | 25 | 1 | 5 | 1 | 2 | 0 | 0 | 0 | 0 | 0 | 32 | 2 |
| Inverness Caledonian Thistle (loan) | 2007–08 | Scottish Premier League | 24 | 0 | 1 | 0 | 0 | 0 | 0 | 0 | – | | 25 | 0 |
| Inverness Caledonian Thistle (loan) | 2008–09 | Scottish Premier League | 11 | 1 | 0 | 0 | 1 | 0 | 0 | 0 | – | | 12 | 1 |
| Inverness Caledonian Thistle (loan) | Total | | 35 | 1 | 1 | 0 | 1 | 0 | 0 | 0 | 0 | 0 | 37 | 1 |
| Arbroath | 2009–10 | Scottish Second Division | 7 | 0 | 0 | 0 | 0 | 0 | – | | 2 | 0 | 9 | 0 |
| Montrose | 2012–13 | Scottish Third Division | 2 | 0 | 0 | 0 | 0 | 0 | – | | – | | 2 | 0 |
| Career total | | | 233 | 12 | 20 | 1 | 13 | 0 | 6 | 0 | 3 | 0 | 275 | 13 |
