= 2008–09 Inverness Caledonian Thistle F.C. season =

Scottish football club season

Inverness Caledonian Thistle F.C.
2008–09 season
- Manager: Craig Brewster, Terry Butcher
- Scottish Premier League: 12th (relegated)
- Scottish Cup: Quarter-final
- Scottish League Cup: Quarter-final
- Top goalscorer: League: Adam Rooney (5); All: Adam Rooney (6)
- Highest home attendance: 7,143 vs. Celtic, 18 October 2008
- Lowest home attendance: 1,803 vs. Partick Thistle, 10 January 2009
- Average home league attendance: 4,186

Inverness Caledonian Thistle F.C. in their 15th season in Scottish football competing in the Scottish Premier League, Scottish League Cup and the Scottish Cup in season 2008–09.

== Results ==
=== Scottish Premier League ===
Match Day	Date	Opponent	H/A	Score	ICT Scorer(s)	Attendance
1	9 August	Aberdeen	A	2–0	Barrowman, McBain	12,659
2	16 August	Hamilton Academical	H	0–1		3,595
3	23 August	Hibernian	H	1–1	Cowie	4,022
4	30 August	Falkirk	A	2–1	Cowie, Imrie	4,730
5	13 September	St Mirren	H	1–2	Rooney	3,501
6	20 September	Heart of Midlothian	A	0–1		12,890
7	27 September	Kilmarnock	H	3–1	McGuire, Barrowman, Black	3,426
8	4 October	Dundee United	A	1–2	Wilkie	6,279
9	18 October	Celtic	H	1–2	Wood	7,143
10	25 October	Motherwell	H	1–2	Rooney	3,110
11	1 November	Rangers	A	0–5		49,255
12	8 November	Hibernian	A	2–1	Cowie, Black	11,688
13	12 November	Falkirk	H	1–1	Rooney	3,111
14	15 November	Heart of Midlothian	H	0–1		4,088
15	22 November	Kilmarnock	A	2–1	Imrie, Wood	4,328
16	29 November	Celtic	A	0–1		55,117
17	6 December	Dundee United	H	1–3	Rooney	3,560
18	13 December	St Mirren	A	0–2		3,364
19	20 December	Aberdeen	H	0–3		5,862
20	27 December	Motherwell	A	2–3	Tokely, Rooney	4,521
21	4 January	Rangers	H	0–3		7,056
22	17 January	Hamilton Academical	A	0–1		3,070
23	24 January	Heart of Midlothian	A	2–3	Mihadjuks, Imrie	13,224
24	1 February	Celtic	H	0–0		7,007
25	14 February	Dundee United	A	1–1	Wilkie	5,926
26	21 February	Hibernian	H	2–0	Proctor, Foran	4,116
27	28 February	Motherwell	H	1–2	Munro	3,611
28	4 March	Rangers	A	0–1	Black	48,129
29	14 March	Kilmarnock	H	2–1	Foran, Black	4,005
30	21 March	Falkirk	A	0–4		5,523
31	4 April	St Mirren	H	2–1	Morais (2)	3,794
32	11 April	Aberdeen	A	0–1	McDonald	11,114
33	18 April	Hamilton Academical	H	1–1	Kerr	3,646
34	2 May	St Mirren	A	2–1	Munro, Tokely	4,171
35	10 May	Hamilton Academical	H	1–1	Foran	3,623
36	13 May	Motherwell	A	2–2	Morais, Imrie	2,818
37	16 May	Kilmarnock	A	0–1		6,096
38	23 May	Falkirk	H	0–1		6,489

==== Final League table ====
Pos	Team	Pld	W	D	L	GF	GA	GD	Pts	Qualification or relegation (Note: Teams played each other three times (33 matches), before the league split into two groups (the top six and the bottom six) for the last five matches.)
8	Kilmarnock	38	12	8	18	38	48	−10	44	
9	Hamilton Academical	38	12	5	21	30	53	−23	41	
10	Falkirk	38	9	11	18	37	52	−15	38	Qualification for the Europa League second qualifying round (Note: Since Rangers, the winners of the Scottish Cup, already qualified for the Champions League via their league position, Falkirk, the losing finalist, earned a spot in the Europa League.)
11	St Mirren	38	9	10	19	33	52	−19	37	
12	Inverness Caledonian Thistle (R)	38	10	7	21	37	58	−21	37	Relegation to the First Division

Source: Scottish Professional Football League
Rules for classification: 1) Points; 2) Goal difference; 3) Goals scored
(R) Relegated

=== Scottish League Cup ===
Round	Date	Opponent	H/A	Score	ICT Scorer(s)	Attendance
R2	27 August	Arbroath	A	2–2 (4–2 on pens.)	Vigurs, Wood	596
R3	23 September	Greenock Morton	A	1–1 (2–1 After extra time.)	Hastings, Imrie	2,023
R4	28 October	Falkirk	A	0–1		3,007

=== Scottish Cup ===
Round	Date	Opponent	H/A	Score	ICT Scorer(s)	Attendance
R4	10 January	Partick Thistle	H	3–0	Morais (2), Vigurs	1,803
R5	7 February	Kilmarnock	H	2–0	Mihadjuks, Rooney	2,578
QF	7 March	Falkirk	H	0–1		3,024
