= Vidar Riseth =

Norwegian footballer (born 1972)

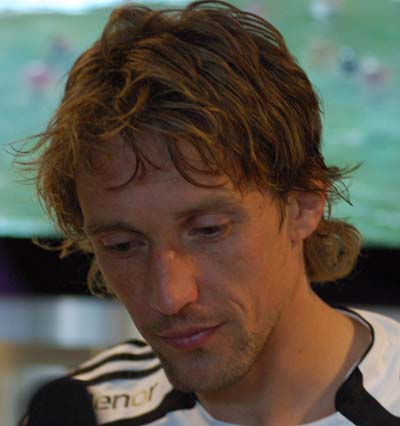
- Riseth in 2006

Personal information
- Full name: Vidar Riseth
- Date of birth: 21 April 1972 (age 54)
- Place of birth: Frosta Municipality, Norway
- Height: 1.89 m (6 ft 2 in)
- Positions: Centre-back; midfielder

Youth career
- –1990: Neset
- 1991–1992: Rosenborg

Senior career*
Years	Team	Apps	(Gls)
1992–1993	Rosenborg	11	(2)
1993–1996	Kongsvinger	56	(20)
1995–1996	→ Luton Town (loan)	11	(0)
1996–1998	LASK Linz	69	(11)
1998–2000	Celtic	56	(3)
2000–2003	1860 Munich	43	(3)
2003–2007	Rosenborg	104	(12)
2007–2009	Lillestrøm	32	(2)
2009	→ Strømsgodset (loan)	7	(0)
2010	Kongsvinger	14	(0)
Total		403	(53)

International career
1997–2007	Norway	52	(4)
- * Club domestic league appearances and goals

Vidar Riseth (born 21 April 1972) is a Norwegian former professional footballer who played as a centre-back or midfielder. He played for Neset, Rosenborg, Kongsvinger, Lillestrøm and Strømsgodset in Norway, and Luton Town, LASK Linz, Celtic and 1860 Munich abroad. He played 52 times for the Norway national team, scoring four goals, and played for his country at the 1998 World Cup and Euro 2000. He retired as a professional footballer in June 2010. He later worked as a professional football commentator.

== Club career ==
=== Early career ===
Riseth joined Rosenborg from local side Neset in January 1991. He played one game in the 1992 championship winning season, but had more games as Rosenborg won back to back in 1993. In 1994, he joined Kongsvinger. He played there for three seasons, scoring regularly as he played as a centre forward at this time of his career. Late in his Kongsvinger career, he went for a brief loan to Luton.

On 20 March 2000, while playing for Scottish club Celtic, he scored the opening goal in the 2000 Scottish League Cup Final, which Celtic went on to win 2–0. In November, he moved on loan to German club 1860 Munich until the end of the season. At the end of his loan spell, the two clubs discussed making the deal permanent.

He returned to Norway to play for Rosenborg, and on 24 October 2007, helped secure their first UEFA Champions League home victory in six years, scoring the second in a shock 2–0 win against Spanish club Valencia.

== Career statistics ==
Appearances and goals by club, season and competition
Club	Season	League			National cup (Note: Includes Norwegian Cup, FA Cup, Austrian Cup, Scottish Cup, DFB-Pokal)		League cup (Note: Includes Football League Cup, Scottish League Cup, Ligapokal,)		Continental		Other		Total	
Club	Season	Division	Apps	Goals	Apps	Goals	Apps	Goals	Apps	Goals	Apps	Goals	Apps	Goals
Rosenborg	1992	Tippeligaen	1	0	0	0	–		0	0	–		1	0
Rosenborg	1993	Tippeligaen	10	2	2	3	–		2	0	–		14	5
Rosenborg	Total		11	2	2	3	0	0	2	0	0	0	15	5
Kongsvinger	1994	Tippeligaen	18	3	2	0	–		–		–		20	3
Kongsvinger	1995	Tippeligaen	24	12	4	3	–		–		–		28	15
Kongsvinger	1996	Tippeligaen	14	5	4	3	–		–		–		18	8
Kongsvinger	Total		56	20	10	6	0	0	0	0	0	0	66	26
Luton Town (loan)	1995–96	Division One	11	0	0	0	0	0	–		1 (Note: Appearance in A-I Cup)	0	12	0
LASK	1996–97	Austrian Bundesliga	33	7	4	1	–		1	0	–		38	8
LASK	1997–98	Austrian Bundesliga	29	4	4	1	–		–		–		33	5
LASK	1998–99	Austrian Bundesliga	7	0	2	0	–		–		–		9	0
LASK	Total		69	11	10	2	—		1	0	0	0	80	13
Celtic	1998–99	Scottish Premier League	27	3	3	0	0	0	0	0	–		30	3
Celtic	1999–2000	Scottish Premier League	28	0	1	0	4	1	5	0	–		38	1
Celtic	2000–01	Scottish Premier League	1	0	0	0	1	0	3	1	–		5	1
Celtic	Total		56	3	4	0	5	1	8	1	0	0	73	5
1860 Munich	2000–01	Bundesliga	21	1	1	0	0	0	0	0	–		22	1
1860 Munich	2001–02	Bundesliga	19	2	1	0	–		6	1	–		26	3
1860 Munich	2002–03	Bundesliga	3	0	1	0	–		1	0	–		5	0
1860 Munich	Total		43	3	3	0	0	0	7	1	0	0	3	4
Rosenborg	2003	Tippeligaen	20	3	5	0	–		10	0	–		35	3
Rosenborg	2004	Tippeligaen	25	4	4	0	–		7	0	5 (Note: Appearances in Royal League)	0	41	4
Rosenborg	2005	Tippeligaen	21	3	1	0	–		10	1	–		32	4
Rosenborg	2006	Tippeligaen	24	1	5	0	–		–		5	1	34	2
Rosenborg	2007	Tippeligaen	14	1	1	0	–		10	1	–		25	2
Rosenborg	Total		104	12	16	0	0	0	37	2	10	1	167	15
Lillestrøm	2008	Tippeligaen	22	2	1	0	–		1	0	–		24	2
Lillestrøm	2009	Tippeligaen	10	0	3	0	–		–		–		13	0
Lillestrøm	Total		32	2	4	0	0	0	1	0	0	0	37	2
Strømsgodset (loan)	2009	Tippeligaen	7	0	0	0	–		–		–		7	0
Kongsvinger	2010	Tippeligaen	14	0	0	0	–		–		–		14	0
Career total			403	53	49	11	15	2	57	4	524	70		

=== International ===
Appearances and goals by national team and year
National team	Year	Apps	Goals
Norway	1997	1	0
Norway	1998	11	2
Norway	1999	8	0
Norway	2000	9	0
Norway	2001	5	0
Norway	2002	3	0
Norway	2003	1	0
Norway	2004	8	2
Norway	2005	2	0
Norway	2006	1	0
Norway	2007	3	0
Total		52	4

Scores and results list Norway's goal tally first, score column indicates score after each Riseth goal.

List of international goals scored by Vidar Riseth
No.	Date	Venue	Opponent	Score	Result	Competition
1	25 March 1998	King Baudouin Stadium, Brussels, Belgium	Belgium	1–1	2–2	Friendly
2	20 May 1998	Bislett Stadium, Oslo, Norway	Mexico	5–2	5–2	Friendly
3	18 August 2004	Ullevaal Stadion, Oslo, Norway	Belgium	2–2	2–2	Friendly
4	8 September 2004	Ullevaal Stadion, Oslo, Norway	Belarus	1–0	1–1	2006 FIFA World Cup qualification

== Honours ==
Rosenborg

- Tippeligaen: 1993, 2003, 2004, 2006
- Norwegian Cup: 2003

Celtic

- League Cup: 1999–2000
