= Kevin Milne (footballer) =

Scottish footballer and coach

Personal information
- Date of birth: 27 April 1981 (age 45)
- Place of birth: Edinburgh, Scotland
- Position: Defender

Team information
- Current team: Musselburgh Athletic (manager)

Youth career
- Aberdeen

Senior career*
Years	Team	Apps	(Gls)
1997–2000	Aberdeen	0	(0)
2000–2001	Stirling Albion	27	(0)
2001–2003	Forfar Athletic	42	(1)
- Linlithgow Rose
- Haddington Athletic

International career
- Scotland U16
- Scotland U17
- Scotland U19

Managerial career
- Heart of Midlothian Women
- 2017: Hawick Royal Albert
- 2017–2018: Hibernian Ladies
- 2018–2020: Penicuik Athletic
- 2021–: Musselburgh Athletic
- * Club domestic league appearances and goals

Kevin Milne is a Scottish professional football player and coach who is the manager of East of Scotland Football League club Musselburgh Athletic. As a player, he was a defender for Aberdeen, Stirling Albion, and Forfar Athletic and represented Scotland at youth level. He has managed Hawick Royal Albert in the Scottish Lowland Football League and Hibernian Ladies in the Scottish Women's Premier League.

== Club career ==
Milne started his career at Aberdeen after leaving St. Davids High School in 1997. He was a regular for both the reserves and youth teams, making 2 appearances for the first team. His appearances came against Inverness Caledonian Thistle F.C. and Celtic.

He played under Roy Aitken, Alex Miller, and Paul Hegarty before being released by Ebbe Skovdahl in the summer of 2000. Milne then signed for Stirling Albion F.C. in the 2000–2001 season, in which the side got relegated to Division 3. Milne left in the summer of 2001 and signed for Forfar Athletic F.C. where he was reunited with former Aberdeen F.C. youth team coach Neil Cooper until his departure in 2003. Following his departure in 2003, Milne signed for Linlithgow Rose and finished his career at Haddington.

== Coaching career ==
Milne started his coaching career at Heart of Midlothian F.C. Ladies in 2012 and in his first season, Hearts gained promotion to Division 1. In 2014, he was in charge when they gained promotion to the top tier in the SWPL 1. Milne left Hearts to become coach at Hibernian L.F.C. where they won the league cup and Scottish Cup. In the same season, Hibernian L.F.C. made progress to the last 32 of the UEFA Women's Champions League where they faced FC Bayern Munich (women) where they lost 10–1 on aggregate.

In February 2017, Milne was appointed as manager of Scottish Lowland Football League team Hawick Royal Albert F.C. He guided the team to safety in the Lowland League, then resigned from his post in May 2017. Milne was then assistant manager at SJFA East Super League club Penicuik before returning to Hibernian Ladies as head coach in October 2017. He left this position in March 2018.

Milne was appointed as manager of East of Scotland League club Musselburgh Athletic in June 2021.
