= Baldur Bett =

Icelandic footballer (born 1980)

Personal information
- Date of birth: 12 April 1980 (age 46)
- Place of birth: Reykjavík, Iceland
- Height: 1.76 m (5 ft 9 in)
- Position: Midfielder

Senior career*
Years	Team	Apps	(Gls)
1998–2000	Aberdeen	2	(0)
2000	FH	7	(0)
2000–2001	Peterhead	7	(1)
2001–2006	FH	99	(3)
2007–2009	Valur	43	(2)
2010–2011	Fylkir	15	(1)
2012	Reynir S.	12	(0)
Total		185	(7)

International career
1995	Iceland U17	4	(0)
1998	Iceland U19	3	(1)
- * Club domestic league appearances and goals

Baldur Bett (born 12 April 1980) is an Icelandic former footballer who last played for Reynir S. in the Icelandic Second Division.

== Club career ==
Baldur began his career at Aberdeen of the Scottish Premier League in 1998 but failed to secure a place in the starting XI and moved on to Peterhead in 2000. After just one season playing in the Scottish lower divisions, he signed for FH Hafnarfjörður in Iceland's Úrvalsdeild.

== Personal life ==
He is the son of Scottish former footballer Jim Bett, and the brother of Calum Bett.
