= Ebbe Skovdahl =

Danish football manager (1945–2020)

Personal information
- Full name: Ebbe Skovdahl Hansen
- Date of birth: 5 July 1945
- Place of birth: Copenhagen, Denmark
- Date of death: 23 October 2020 (aged 75)
- Place of death: Karlslunde, Denmark
- Position: Defender

Senior career*
Years	Team	Apps	(Gls)
195?–1971	Vanløse	130	(?)
1971–1977	Brøndby	89	(?)

Managerial career
- 1977–1977: Brøndby (3rd team)
- 1978–1980: Hvalsø
- 1980–1981: Glostrup
- 1982–1985: Brønshøj
- 1986–1987: Brøndby
- 1987–1988: Benfica
- 1988–1989: Brøndby
- 1990–1991: Vejle
- 1992–1999: Brøndby
- 1999–2002: Aberdeen
- 2003–2005: Frem
- * Club domestic league appearances and goals

Ebbe Skovdahl Hansen (5 July 1945 – 23 October 2020) was a Danish football manager. He most prominently was a successful manager at Brøndby, for whom he had also played in his active years. He helped turn the side into the most dominant Danish team in the 1990s, and he also managed the club in several European campaigns with regular successful UEFA Cup runs, and a UEFA Champions League qualification. He won numerous Danish Superliga and Danish Cup titles.

== Career ==
Skovdahl started playing as a child for Vanløse. He played 130 amateur games for the club before he moved to Brøndby in the Danish 3rd Division in 1971. Following 89 amateur matches, many of them as team captain, he went on to become Brøndby's third team coach in 1977. He coached a few minor Danish teams Hvalsø and Glostrup, before he secured two consecutive promotions for Brønshøj to the Danish 1st Division in 1982, the then best league of football in Denmark. In 1986, he moved back to coach Brøndby, who had just won the Danish football championship in 1985.

=== Championship coach ===
Skovdahl went on to coach Brøndby towards its second Danish championship in 1987 and he also guided the club to the quarterfinals of the 1986–87 European Cup international tournament. Following two years at Brøndby, Skovdahl moved to Portugal before the conclusion of the Danish season to coach the defending Portuguese Liga champions Benfica. Birger Peitersen went on to finish his job at Brøndby and secured the 1987 Danish championship. The job at Benfica was too much for the internationally inexperienced Skovdahl, and he lasted half a year in the club. He returned to coach Brøndby in 1988 where he won his first Danish championship as well as the Danish Cup trophy, before Skovdahl had a short interlude at Vejle in the 1990 and 1991 seasons. Following the near-bankruptcy of Brøndby in 1992, Skovdahl returned to the club once more.

In his first year at Brøndby, he coached a 5–3–2 system, and re-schooled former attacking players Jes Høgh and Ole Bjur to more defensive positions, where they blossomed. Though Brøndby did not win the Danish championship in his first year, Skovdahl was named 1992–93 Danish Manager of the Year, for rebuilding the Brøndby team by re-schooling players to their best abilities. He went on to install a 4–4–2 system with hardworking players, whose constant pressure on the opponent, combined with the necessary technical and tactical skills, went on to dominate the Danish championship for half a decade. After a few seasons of stable play and secondary finishes in the domestic league, the big turn-around for the club came in the 1995–96 UEFA Cup when Liverpool were eliminated, and including that season, Brøndby won three Danish championships in a row. The success of the team under Skovdahl concluded in qualification for the 1998–99 UEFA Champions League tournament, as the second Danish team (after AaB in 1995). In all, Skovdahl won four Danish championships and three Danish Cups and guided Brøndby to a number of individual results in the European competitions.

=== Aberdeen ===
In 1999, he moved to become a popular manager of Scottish side Aberdeen in the top-flight Scottish Premier League (SPL) division. Aberdeen overachieved in Scotland in the eighties and early nineties, but the club started to decline from 1995. By 1999, heavily in debt and not capable of matching the Old Firm in the transfer market, the Dons needed to appoint a successful coach who could work with a small budget. So, the club went for the fashionable idea of appointing a successful foreign coach in Skovdahl.

In Skovdahl's first season at Aberdeen, the club finished bottom of the 1999–2000 Scottish Premier League, but Aberdeen avoided a potential relegation play-off due to Falkirk not meeting the SPL stadium requirements. Despite overseeing one of the poorest sides in Aberdeen's recent history in his first season in charge, Skovdahl proved popular with the fans. In that first year, he brought in many foreign signings, with mixed success, and among his signings were Arild Stavrum, Hicham Zerouali and Roberto Bisconti. The one highlight of Skovdahl's first season was that Aberdeen reached both the 2000 Scottish League Cup Final and the 2000 Scottish Cup Final, but they lost both finals to Celtic and Rangers respectively.

In the following season, Aberdeen's fortunes improved domestically, but were knocked out of the 2000–01 UEFA Cup by Irish side Bohemians on the away goals rule. This was the first time that a Scottish club had been knocked out of European competition by Irish opposition. The next year, Aberdeen improved dramatically, as Skovdahl guided them to fourth place in the 2001–02 Scottish Premier League. Young players such as Kevin McNaughton, Russell Anderson, Philip McGuire, striker Darren Mackie and goalkeeper Ryan Esson were developed.

Yet with the Bosman ruling, and Aberdeen's substantial debt, which had built up before Skovdahl became manager, it became clear that the system Skovdahl had used with Brøndby could not be maintained at Aberdeen. With many of the players he had developed on short term contract, and likely to leave at the end of the 2002–03 season, it became clear to Skovdahl that he could not in the long term achieve at Aberdeen what he had with Brøndby. Aberdeen lost narrowly to Hertha Berlin in the 2002–03 UEFA Cup. The club had a poor domestic start to the 2002–03 campaign, prompting Skovdahl to announce his intention to resign. He was replaced by Steve Paterson in December 2002.

=== Danish return ===
He returned to Danish Superliga club Frem, who he tried to save from relegation, though without success. Following disputes with the club board over the long-term aims of the club, Skovdahl resigned in winter 2005.

== Personal life ==
Skovdahl was the uncle of Danish international footballers Michael and Brian Laudrup.

== Death ==
Skovdahl died after years of battling cancer on 23 October 2020 at the age of 75.

== Honours ==
- Danish Championship: 1988, 1995–96, 1996–97, 1997–98
- Danish Cup: 1988–89, 1993–94, 1997–98
