= Dougie Imrie =

Scottish footballer (born 1983)

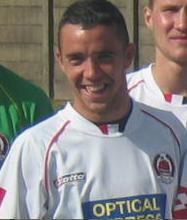
- Imrie with Clyde

Personal information
- Date of birth: 3 August 1983 (age 43)
- Place of birth: Lanark, Scotland
- Position: Winger

Team information
- Current team: Raith Rovers (manager)

Youth career
- Kirkfield
- Lanark Thistle
- Symington Tinto

Senior career*
Years	Team	Apps	(Gls)
2004–2006	Lanark United	42	(14)
2006–2008	Clyde	64	(12)
2008–2010	Inverness Caledonian Thistle	66	(7)
2010–2012	Hamilton Academical	81	(11)
2012–2013	St Mirren	41	(3)
2013–2014	Greenock Morton	33	(9)
2014–2019	Hamilton Academical	196	(24)
Total		435	(66)

Managerial career
- 2021–2025: Greenock Morton
- 2025–: Raith Rovers
- * Club domestic league appearances and goals

Douglas Imrie (born 3 August 1983) is a Scottish professional football manager and former player, who currently manages Scottish Championship club Raith Rovers.

Imrie played as either a forward or a winger in the professional leagues for Clyde, Inverness Caledonian Thistle, St Mirren, Greenock Morton and Hamilton Academical, having previously played in the Junior league for Lanark United.

== Club career ==
=== Lanark United ===
Imrie was born in Lanark and came to prominence with local side Junior side Lanark United. He made 138 appearances for them, scoring 77 goals. He had previously played for amateur clubs Kirkfield United, Lanark Thistle and Symington Tinto.

=== Clyde ===
Imrie stepped up to the senior game when Graham Roberts signed him for Clyde in the January transfer window of 2006. He made his debut in the 5–0 victory over Stranraer in the Scottish First Division on 11 February 2006. Imrie's first goal for Clyde was a spectacular overhead volley from the edge of the area against Queen of the South in a 2–1 defeat on 4 March 2006. His next goal was also one to remember, as he scored the winner against Dundee at Dens Park when his cross was deflected into the net.

On 5 August 2006, Imrie signed a new contract, keeping him at Clyde until 2008. In September 2006, Imrie was involved in a collision with Hamilton Academical player Ross McCabe, in which Imrie jumped out of the way of McCabe's tackle and landed awkwardly on McCabe's neck. McCabe needed emergency assistance on the pitch, and had to retire from football as a result of an underlying heart condition that doctors discovered whilst treating him for the injury sustained in the accident.

Imrie's last Clyde goal was scored in his final game, in a 3–2 defeat against rivals Hamilton Academical on 26 January 2008. The goal was a free kick from 25 yards out.

=== Inverness Caledonian Thistle ===
On 31 January 2008 he signed a two and half-year deal with Inverness Caledonian Thistle moving for a transfer fee of £45,000, depending on appearances. He made his debut for the club on 9 February 2008 in a 1–1 draw with St Mirren. Imrie settled in fairly well at Caley Thistle and registered two assists in a game against Gretna on 5 April 2008. and scored his first goal in the following match, a free kick in a 3–0 home win against Kilmarnock on 19 April 2008. He made his last appearance for Caley Thistle in a 1–0 win against Airdrie United.

=== Hamilton Academical ===
Imrie signed for Hamilton Academical The club he reportedly supported in childhood, for close to £25,000 on 1 February 2010 and he made his debut in the Lanarkshire derby with Motherwell on 6 February. He signed a new two-year contract on 13 July 2010. He won the BBC Sportsound Player of the Year in 2009–10 for accumulating the most man-of-the-matches performances throughout the SPL season, despite only joining Accies in February.

In the first month after Hamilton's relegation from the Scottish Premier League, Imrie won the SFL Player of the Month award for August 2011. On 12 January 2012, Dundee United made an offer of £25,000 to Hamilton for Imrie, which was rejected.

=== St Mirren ===
St Mirren had a bid accepted for the player on 19 January 2012 of £35,000 and Imrie signed for the Paisley club on a two-and-a-half-year contract. His first appearance came two days later, in a 2–0 home defeat against Celtic. He scored his first goal for the club on 24 November 2012, as St Mirren beat Dundee 3–1.

On 29 May 2013, Imrie's contract with St Mirren was terminated by mutual consent.

=== Morton ===
Imrie left "Saints" to sign for local rivals Greenock Morton in July 2013. He scored his first goal for Morton in a 6–2 Scottish League Cup win over East Fife. He scored again in the League Cup, against Celtic in the 3rd round, from the penalty spot on 24 September 2013, as Morton won 1–0 at Celtic Park.

He left Morton after they were relegated to League One despite an offer of a contract extension.

=== Hamilton Academical (second spell) ===
Imrie re-signed with Hamilton in June 2014. He scored on his second debut for the club as Hamilton beat Arbroath 2–1 in the first round of the League Cup on 2 August 2014. In January 2015, when teammate Martin Canning became Accies player-manager, Imrie was invited to take up a role coaching the club's youth teams. In April 2015, he signed a new contract with the club until summer 2016, and in January 2016 he agreed another new contract until summer 2017. In December 2017, Imrie signed a contract extension with Hamilton until May 2019. In June 2018, the Under-17 team he coached (along with Darian MacKinnon) became Scottish champions in the age group, qualifying for the UEFA Youth League. In July 2018, he became the club captain. Imrie retired from playing football at the end of the 2018/19 season.

== Coaching career ==
In May 2021, Imrie was announced as the first-team coach and Head of Professional Programmes for Scottish Premiership side Livingston.

=== Greenock Morton ===
Imrie was appointed manager of Greenock Morton on 21 December 2021. Imrie only lost three games out of his opening 12 and in his first two full months as manager he won Championship manager of the month for January and February. Imrie managed to steer Morton to safety, finishing the 2021-22 season in seventh place on 40 points, losing 3–0 in the last game of the season against Arbroath.

For the 2022-23 season Imrie was given a small budget to work with, as Morton and many other clubs were facing financial difficulty. This, however, was eventually alleviated as the club managed to secure further funding. Under Imrie, Morton underwent a successful run of form, going unbeaten from 1 October 2022 until 7 January 2023. He also was awarded Manager of the Month for September/October 2022 and February 2023. Having mounted a playoff challenge for the majority of the season, Morton lost out on the last day due to goal difference, as well as finishing six points behind Champions Dundee.

Imrie's retained the majority of his squad for the 2023-24 season with players such as Robbie Muirhead, George Oakley, Robbie Crawford and Grant Gillespie. The Ton finished runners-up in the 2023-24 Scottish League Cup group stage, following a 4–1 home victory against Edinburgh City, and faced Rangers in the last 16, losing 2–1. Despite sitting at the foot of the Championship with just eight points from 12 games and following a defeat on penalties against Airdrieonians in the SPFL Trust Trophy on 18 November 2023, Morton went 16 matches unbeaten, including a 2-1 Scottish Cup victory at home to Motherwell. Morton would finish the season in fifth place, seven points behind fourth placed Airdrieonians.

In the 2024-25 season, the club also lost out on the top four, finishing in sixth place.

=== Raith Rovers ===
On 25 November 2025, Imrie departed Morton to join Raith Rovers as their new manager on a two-and-a-half year deal.

== Career statistics ==
Appearances and goals by club, season and competition
Club	Season	League			Scottish Cup		League Cup		Other		Total	
Club	Season	Division	Apps	Goals	Apps	Goals	Apps	Goals	Apps	Goals	Apps	Goals
Clyde	2005–06	Scottish First Division	11	2	1	0	0	0	0	0	12	2
Clyde	2006–07	Scottish First Division	34 (Note: Includes one appearance and one goal not recorded on Soccerbase. "Clyde 1 v 2 Gretna". Clyde F.C. 13 August 2006.)	6	1	0	1	1	3 (Note: Appearances in the Scottish Challenge Cup)	1	39	8
Clyde	2007–08	Scottish First Division	19 (Note: Includes one appearance not recorded on Soccerbase. "Dundee 0 v 1 Clyde". Clyde F.C. 11 November 2007.)	4	2	1	1	0	2	0	24	5
Clyde	Total		64	12	4	1	2	1	5	1	75	15
Inverness Caledonian Thistle	2007–08	Scottish Premier League	15	2	0	0	0	0	—		15	2
Inverness Caledonian Thistle	2008–09	Scottish Premier League	38	4	2	0	3	1	—		43	5
Inverness Caledonian Thistle	2009–10	Scottish First Division	13	1	1	1	1	1	1 (Note: Appearance in the Scottish Challenge Cup not recorded on Soccerbase or Soccerway. Campbell, Andy (22 November 2009). "Dundee 3–2 Inverness CT". BBC Sport.)	0	16	3
Inverness Caledonian Thistle	Total		66	7	3	1	4	2	1	0	74	10
Hamilton Academical	2009–10	Scottish Premier League	16	2	0	0	0	0	—		16	2
Hamilton Academical	2010–11	Scottish Premier League	35	4	2	0	1	0	—		38	4
Hamilton Academical	2011–12	Scottish First Division	19	5	2	0	1	0	4	0	26	5
Hamilton Academical	Total		70	11	4	0	2	0	4	0	80	11
St Mirren	2011–12	Scottish Premier League	14	0	0	0	0	0	—		14	0
St Mirren	2012–13	Scottish Premier League	27	3	1	0	2	0	—		30	3
St Mirren	Total		41	3	1	0	2	0	0	0	44	3
Greenock Morton	2013–14	Scottish Championship	33	9	1	0	4	2	1	0	39	11
Hamilton Academical	2014–15	Scottish Premiership	34	2	1	0	3	1	—		38	3
Hamilton Academical	2015–16	Scottish Premiership	35	6	0	0	1	0	—		36	6
Hamilton Academical	2016–17	Scottish Premiership	37	4	4	0	5	3	2 (Note: Appearances in the Premiership play-offs)	0	48	7
Hamilton Academical	2017–18	Scottish Premiership	35	8	1	0	5	0	—		41	8
Hamilton Academical	2018–19	Scottish Premiership	29	4	1	0	4	1	–		34	5
Hamilton Academical	Total		170	24	7	0	17	5	2	0	196	29
Career total			444	66	20	2	32	10	13	1	509	79

=== Managerial statistics ===
As of match played 14 November 2026

Team	From	To	Record					
Team	From	To	G	W	D	L	Win %	
Greenock Morton	21 December 2021	25 November 2025	175	66	53	56	37.71	
Raith Rovers	25 November 2025	Present	45	19	14	12	42.22	
Career Total			220	85	67	68	38.64	—

== Honours ==
=== Player ===
Lanark United

- Evening Times Cup: 2004–05
- Clydesdale Cup runner-up: 2019–20

Inverness Caledonian Thistle

- Scottish First Division: 2009–10
- Scottish Challenge Cup runner-up: 2009–10

St Mirren

- Renfrewshire Cup: 2012–13

Greenock Morton

- Renfrewshire Cup: 2013–14

Hamilton Academical

- Scottish Premiership Play-offs: 2016–17

=== Manager ===
Raith Rovers

- Scottish Challenge Cup: 2025–26
