= Ross O'Donoghue =

Scottish footballer

Personal information
- Date of birth: 9 February 1983 (age 43)
- Place of birth: Glasgow, Scotland
- Position: Centre midfielder

Youth career
- 1999–2000: Aberdeen

Senior career*
| Years | Team | Apps | (Gls) |
| 2000–2003 | Aberdeen | 8 | (0) |
- Cumbernauld United
- Pollok
| 2007–2009 | Elgin City | 65 | (3) |
| 2009–2010 | Dumbarton | 19 | (1) |
| 2010–2013 | Elgin City | 83 | (6) |
| 2013–2014 | East Stirlingshire | 25 | (0) |
- * Club domestic league appearances and goals as of 29 May 2014

Ross O'Donoghue (born 9 February 1983) is a Scottish former footballer.

O'Donoghue started his career with Scottish Premier League side Aberdeen, before spending four years in the juniors. He returned to the Scottish Football League in 2007 with Elgin City.

Championship Manager Legend ....

== Career ==
O'Donoghue started his career as a youth player with Aberdeen, before playing with junior sides Cumbernauld United and Pollok. He moved back into the senior game with Elgin City in 2007, where he became captain, before moving for a season to Dumbarton. He returned to Elgin in the summer of 2010.

In the summer of 2013, O'Donoghue signed for East Stirlingshire after being released by Elgin.
