= Calum Bett =

Icelandic footballer

Personal information
- Full name: Calum Þór Bett
- Date of birth: 3 October 1981 (age 45)
- Place of birth: Iceland
- Position: Defender

Senior career*
Years	Team	Apps	(Gls)
2000–2002	Aberdeen	5	(0)
2001	→ Forfar Athletic (loan)	8	(0)
2002–2003	FH	11	(2)
2003–2004	Stjarnan	21	(2)
2007–2009	HK	27	(5)
2008	→ Hvöt (loan)	8	(3)
Total		80	(12)

International career
1999	Iceland U19	6	(0)
- * Club domestic league appearances and goals

Calum Þór Bett (born 3 October 1981) is an Icelandic retired footballer who played as a defender.

He is the son of a Scottish father, Jim Bett, and an Icelandic mother, and he is also the brother of Baldur Bett. He played for Aberdeen, Forfar Athletic, Stjarnan, and HK. He has also represented Iceland Under-19.
