= 1999–2000 Scottish Cup =

1999–00 Tennent's Scottish Cup
Tournament details
- Country: Scotland

Final positions
- Champions: Rangers
- Runners-up: Aberdeen

Tournament statistics
- Top goal scorer: Billy Dodds (5)

The 1999–2000 Scottish Cup was the 115th staging of Scotland's most prestigious football knockout competition, also known for sponsorship reasons as the Tennent's Scottish Cup. The Cup was won by Rangers who defeated Aberdeen 4–0 in the final.

== First round ==
Home team	Score	Away team
Threave Rovers	1 – 7	Stenhousemuir
Hamilton Academical	1 – 2	Clyde
Huntly	0 – 1	East Stirlingshire
Ross County	2 – 2	Forfar Athletic

=== Replays ===
Home team	Score	Away team
Forfar Athletic	0 – 0 (4 – 2 pen.)	Ross County

== Second round ==
Home team	Score	Away team
Albion Rovers	0 – 0	Dalbeattie Star
Arbroath	0 – 0	Fraserburgh
Brechin City	2 – 2	Annan Athletic
Cowdenbeath	2 – 3	Clyde
Dumbarton	0 – 2	Stenhousemuir
Montrose	1 – 3	Queen of the South
Partick Thistle	2 – 1	East Stirlingshire
Peterhead	2 – 1	Forfar Athletic
Queen’s Park	1 – 2	Berwick Rangers
Stirling Albion	2 – 1	East Fife
Stranraer	1 – 0	Clachnacuddin
Whitehill Welfare	2 – 2	Alloa Athletic

=== Replays ===
Home team	Score	Away team
Annan Athletic	2 – 3	Brechin City
Dalbeattie Star	1 – 5	Albion Rovers
Fraserburgh	1 – 3	Arbroath
Alloa Athletic	2 – 0	Whitehill Welfare

== Third round ==
Home team	Score	Away team
Albion Rovers	1 – 2	Partick Thistle
Arbroath	1 – 1	Motherwell
Celtic	1 – 3	Inverness CT
Clyde	3 – 1	Raith Rovers
Clydebank	1 – 0	Stirling Albion
Dundee	0 – 0	Ayr United
Dundee United	4 – 1	Airdrieonians
Falkirk	3 – 1	Peterhead
Greenock Morton	1 – 1	Brechin City
Hearts	3 – 2	Stenhousemuir
Hibernian	4 – 1	Dunfermline Athletic
Kilmarnock	0 – 0	Alloa Athletic
Queen of the South	0 – 7	Livingston
St Johnstone	0 – 2	Rangers
St Mirren	1 – 1	Aberdeen
Stranraer	1 – 2	Berwick Rangers

=== Replays ===
Home team	Score	Away team
Aberdeen	2 – 0	St Mirren
Alloa Athletic	1 – 0	Kilmarnock
Ayr United	1 – 1 (7 – 6 pen.)	Dundee
Motherwell	2 – 0	Arbroath
Brechin City	0 – 0 (3 – 4 pen.)	Greenock Morton

== Fourth round ==
Home team	Score	Away team
Alloa Athletic	2 – 2	Dundee United
Berwick Rangers	0 – 0	Falkirk
Clyde	0 – 2	Hearts
Hibernian	1 – 1	Clydebank
Greenock Morton	0 – 1	Rangers
Inverness CT	1 – 1	Aberdeen
Motherwell	3 – 4	Ayr United
Partick Thistle	2 – 1	Livingston

=== Replays ===
Home team	Score	Away team
Aberdeen	1 – 0	Inverness CT
Clydebank	0 – 3	Hibernian
Falkirk	3 – 0	Berwick Rangers
Dundee United	4 – 0	Alloa Athletic

== Quarter-finals ==
Home team	Score	Away team
Dundee United	0 – 1	Aberdeen
Rangers	4 – 1	Hearts
Ayr United	2 – 0	Partick Thistle
Hibernian	3 – 1	Falkirk

== Semi-finals ==
8 April 2000

Ayr United	0–7	Rangers
		Rozental 18', 89'; Kanchelskis 27'; Wallace 41'; Dodds 66', 72', 86'

Hampden Park, Glasgow
Attendance: 38,357
Referee: John Rowbotham

9 April 2000

Hibernian	1–2	Aberdeen
Latapy 56'		Stavrum 64'; Dow 68'

Hampden Park, Glasgow
Attendance: 22,193
Referee: Stuart Dougal

== Final ==
27 May 2000

Aberdeen	0–4	Rangers
	Report	Van Bronckhorst 35'; Vidmar 47'; Dodds 49'; Albertz 50'

Hampden Park, Glasgow
Attendance: 50,865
Referee: Jim McCluskey

== Largest Wins ==
A list of the largest wins from the competition.

Score	Home team	Away team	Stage
0-7	Queen of the South	Livingston	Third Round
0-7	Ayr United	Rangers	Semi Final
1-7	Threave Rovers	Stenhousemuir	First Round
1-5	Dalbeattie Star	Albion Rovers	Second Round (Replay)
4-0	Dundee United	Alloa Athletic	Fourth Round
0-4	Aberdeen	Rangers	Final

== See also ==
- Super Caley go ballistic, Celtic are atrocious
