= Cato Guntveit =

Norwegian footballer (born 1975)

Personal information
- Full name: Cato Falck Guntveit
- Date of birth: 6 August 1975 (age 51)
- Place of birth: Drammen, Norway
- Height: 1.78 m (5 ft 10 in)
- Position: Right-back

Youth career
- Fana

Senior career*
Years	Team	Apps	(Gls)
- Fana
1995–1999	Brann	78	(4)
1999–2002	Aberdeen	69	(5)
2002–2010	Brann	95	(3)
2011–	Øystese	18	(4)
- * Club domestic league appearances and goals as of 8 October 2012

Cato Guntveit is a retired Norwegian footballer who played for SK Brann the most of his career. He was the captain of Brann from 2004 until Brann coach Mons Ivar Mjelde decided Martin Andresen should take over the captaincy prior to the 2006 season. Guntveit played briefly for local club Fana before joining Brann in 1995. He also spent two seasons at Aberdeen, but played in Brann from 2002 to 2010. Guntveit is married and has three children. One of the few "local lads" in Brann, he owns and works in a toyshop in Bergen. He retired from football in after the 2010 season.

== Biography ==
=== Early career ===
Guntveit made his debut for Brann at age 20, under coach Hallvar Thoresen. Thoresen used him frequently as a full back, but when Thoresen was fired, things took a turn for the worse for Guntveit, and he spent less time on the pitch. The following seasons, Guntveit failed to secure a steady first team place, but in the 1998 season, he regained his place for Brann. During that season, new coach Harald Aabrekk moved Guntveit up to the midfield as a right winger, where he enjoyed considerable success, and was seen as a primal factor for Brann's success in 1999, when the club finished 3rd in the Norwegian Premier League and reached the cup final.

=== Spell at Aberdeen ===
In 1999, Cato Guntveit was signed by the Scottish Premier League club Aberdeen as a free transfer. He gained a reputation as a committed player, but his career at the Scottish outfit was hampered due to several injuries. In summer 2002 he returned to Brann after being released from Aberdeen, having played 69 games and scored 5 goals.

=== Return to Brann ===
After returning to Brann, it took Guntveit nearly a year to make his debut, due to a mysterious injury. When he finally made his debut however, he became an integral part of the team, and was once again named a primal factor for Brann's success, this time in the latter half of the 2003 season.

In 2004, Guntveit became the captain of Brann, but he missed the final as Brann won the Norwegian Cup in 2004 (their first trophy since 1982) because of a suspension. In 2005, the arrival of Martin Andresen threatened Guntveit's captaincy, as many believed the Norway national team captain (Andresen) would become the captain of Brann. However, Guntveit remained the captain of Brann, but has revealed that the captaincy distracted him from his game, and he was recently stripped of the captaincy prior to the 2006 season, when coach Mons Ivar Mjelde made Andresen captain in a widely anticipated move.

He retired from Brann after the 2010 season, but was enticed by a friend to continue playing, for fourth-tier team Øystese IL, rejecting offers from Løv-Ham and Fana.

== Career statistics ==
=== Appearances and goals by club, season and competition ===
Club	Season	League			National Cup		League Cup		Europe		Total	
Club	Season	Division	Apps	Goals	Apps	Goals	Apps	Goals	Apps	Goals	Apps	Goals
Brann	1995	Tippeligaen	11	0	3	0	-	-	0	0	14	0
Brann	1996	Tippeligaen	4	0	0	0	-	-	2	0	6	0
Brann	1997	Tippeligaen	13	0	1	0	-	-	3	0	17	0
Brann	1998	Tippeligaen	24	3	4	0	-	-	4	0	32	3
Brann	1999	Tippeligaen	26	1	6	2	-	-	0	0	32	3
Brann	Total		78	4	14	2	-	-	9	0	101	6
Aberdeen	1999-00	SPL	20	3	6	1	3	0	0	0	29	4
Aberdeen	2000-01	SPL	30	1	2	0	1	0	1	0	34	1
Aberdeen	2001-02	SPL	19	1	2	0	0	0	0	0	21	1
Aberdeen	Total		69	5	10	1	4	0	1	0	84	6
Brann	2003	Tippeligaen	12	3	1	0	-	-	0	0	13	3
Brann	2004	Tippeligaen	23	0	6	1	-	-	0	0	29	6
Brann	2005	Tippeligaen	11	0	1	1	-	-	0	0	12	1
Brann	2006	Tippeligaen	0	0	0	0	4	0	2	0	6	0
Brann	2007	Tippeligaen	16	0	2	1	2	0	7	1	27	2
Brann	2008	Tippeligaen	13	0	2	0	-	-	1	0	16	0
Brann	2009	Tippeligaen	5	0	0	0	-	-	0	0	5	0
Brann	2010	Tippeligaen	15	0	1	0	-	-	0	0	16	0
Brann	Total		95	3	13	3	6	0	10	1	124	7
Career total			242	12	37	6	10	0	20	1	309	19

== Honours ==
=== Norway ===
- Norwegian Premier League: 2007
- Norwegian Cup: 2004
