= Thomas Solberg =

Norwegian footballer (born 1970)

Personal information
- Full name: Thomas Solberg
- Date of birth: 25 January 1970 (age 56)
- Place of birth: Oslo, Norway
- Height: 6 ft 2 in (1.88 m)
- Position: Defender

Senior career*
Years	Team	Apps	(Gls)
–1989	Ekholt BK		
1989–1994	Moss		
1994–1999	Viking	70	(7)
1999–2002	Aberdeen	63	(5)
2002–2003	Moss	5	(1)
- * Club domestic league appearances and goals

Thomas Solberg (born 25 January 1970) is a Norwegian former football defender. Solberg began his career at Ekholt before joining Moss, the first of two spells with the club. In 1994, Solberg moved to Viking, where he stayed for over five years before an August 1999 move to Scottish side Aberdeen. He helped Aberdeen reach the 2000 Scottish League Cup Final, but was sent off in the game as they lost to Celtic. Solberg announced in October 2001 that he would return to Moss in the summer at the end of his contract, citing "homesickness" as the reason. In fact, Solberg returned slightly ahead of schedule, returning to Moss in March.
