= Russell Duncan =

Scottish footballer

Personal information
- Date of birth: 15 September 1980 (age 46)
- Place of birth: Aberdeen, Scotland
- Position: Midfielder

Youth career
- 1996–2000: Aberdeen

Senior career*
Years	Team	Apps	(Gls)
2000–2001	Aberdeen	0	(0)
2000	→ Elgin City	6	(0)
2001	→ Forfar Athletic (loan)	2	(0)
2001	Forfar Athletic	14	(0)
2001–2011	Inverness Caledonian Thistle	288	(9)
2011–2012	Ross County	7	(0)
2012	Peterhead	5	(0)
- Brora Rangers
- * Club domestic league appearances and goals

Russell Duncan (born 15 September 1980) is a Scottish professional footballer.

Duncan joined Inverness Caledonian Thistle from Aberdeen in 2001, and made nearly 300 league appearances in 10 seasons with the club. During May 2011, Duncan and Grant Munro were told that they would not have their contracts renewed. His final game at the Caledonian Stadium was against St Mirren, but Duncan was sent off for a tangle with St Mirren defender Lee Mair. He played his last game for Inverness as a second-half substitute for Grant Munro in a 2–1 win at New Douglas Park.

Duncan then signed for Ross County, but was released by in December 2012.
