= Andreas Mayer (footballer, born 1972) =

German footballer

Personal information
- Date of birth: 13 September 1972 (age 54)
- Place of birth: Burgau, West Germany
- Height: 1.79 m (5 ft 10 in)
- Position: Midfielder

Youth career
- –1991: FC Augsburg

Senior career*
Years	Team	Apps	(Gls)
1991–1993	Bayern Munich (A)		(2)
1992–1993	Bayern Munich	0	(0)
1993–1995	FC St. Pauli	37	(2)
1995–1997	Stabæk		
1997–1998	Rosenborg		
1998–2001	Aberdeen	41	(2)
2001–2003	KSV Hessen Kassel		
2003–2005	FC St. Pauli	42	(2)
2005–2008	SV Wilhelmshaven		
2008–2009	VfB Oldenburg		
- * Club domestic league appearances and goals

Andreas Mayer (born 13 September 1972) is a German former professional footballer who played as a midfielder. He played for clubs in Germany, Norway and Scotland.

== Career ==
Mayer was a youth player with Bayern Munich, but never appeared for the first team.

In January 1999 he moved to Scottish Premier League with Aberdeen from Norwegian club Rosenborg. The transfer fee paid to Rosenborg was reported as £200,000. In December 2000, with Mayer's contract running out in the summer, Aberdeen announced that he was free to leave the club.
