= Rachid Belabed =

Belgian-born Moroccan footballer

Personal information
- Full name: Rachid Belabed
- Date of birth: 20 October 1980 (age 46)
- Place of birth: Brussels, Belgium
- Height: 1.77 m (5 ft 9 1/2 in)
- Position: Midfielder

Team information
- Current team: Sporting Club Steinfort

Senior career*
Years	Team	Apps	(Gls)
1997–1998	Anderlecht	0	(0)
1998–1999	Molenbeek	13	(0)
1999–2002	Aberdeen	40	(1)
2002–2004	La Louviere	21	(0)
2005–2006	Eupen	15	(0)
2006–2007	FC Wiltz 71	10	(2)
2007–2009	Racing FC Union Luxembourg	48	(11)
2009–2010	RM Hamm Benfica	24	(3)
2010–	Sporting Club Steinfort		
- * Club domestic league appearances and goals

Rachid Belabed (born 20 October 1980 in Brussels) is a Belgian-born Moroccan footballer, who plays for Luxembourg 1. Division club SC Steinfort.

== Football career ==
Belabed signed for Scottish Premier League club Aberdeen in 1999 for a fee of £100,000. He made 40 appearances in the Scottish Premier League, scoring once against Dundee United, before leaving the club when his contract expired in 2002. He then signed for Belgian side La Louviere, who sacked him in 2004 for attacking a journalist. While at La Louvière he helped them win the 2002–03 Belgian Cup.

== Personal life ==
Belabed was born in Belgium to a Moroccan father and an Algerian mother.

In 2004, Belabed assaulted Claude Moniquet, a journalist. Belabed's actions followed remarks made by Moniquet during a televised debate on terrorism. Belabed had accused Moniquet of being racist and an enemy of Islam.
