= Grant Munro (footballer) =

Scottish footballer

Personal information
- Date of birth: 15 September 1980 (age 46)
- Place of birth: Inverness, Scotland
- Position: Defender

Senior career*
Years	Team	Apps	(Gls)
1998–2011	Inverness Caledonian Thistle	314	(13)
2000–2001	→ Elgin City (loan)	8	(0)
2011–2013	Ross County	77	(4)
2013–2016	Brora Rangers	18	(2)
2017	Rothes	7	(2)
Total		424	(21)

Managerial career
- 2016: Brora Rangers
- * Club domestic league appearances and goals

Grant Munro (born 15 September 1980 in Inverness, Scotland) is a Scottish former footballer. He was, most recently, with Rothes in the Highland Football League.

== Career ==
On 9 February 2008, Munro scored the 1000th goal in the history of Inverness Caledonian Thistle, in a 1-1 draw against St Mirren. In October 2008, Munro signed a new contract with the Caley Jags to keep him at the club until 2011. In May 2011 it was announced by the club that Munro would not receive a new contract. Despite this he went on to score for Inverness in their 3-2 win over Celtic on 4 May to dent their title hopes.

It was announced on Tuesday 24 May 2011 that Munro has signed a 2-year pre-contract deal with Ross County. Manager Derek Adams said "I am delighted to have signed Grant. His experience on the pitch will be vital in the season ahead. He has been a consistent performer over many years and will add further quality to our squad." It was confirmed on 21 May 2013 that Munro had been handed a contract extension as a reward for the fifth-placed finish in the Scottish Premier League.

Munro left Ross County on 15 October 2013 to pursue a career outwith full-time football, signing a three-year deal with Brora Rangers on 25 October 2013.

On 27 June 2016, Munro become the new manager at Brora Rangers

On 8 December 2016, he resigned as manager of Brora Rangers

He soon returned to the game, when he was appointed assistant manager at Rothes in January 2017. However, shortly after, Munro resigned the position, citing work pressures.
