= Arild Stavrum =

Norwegian footballer (born 1972)

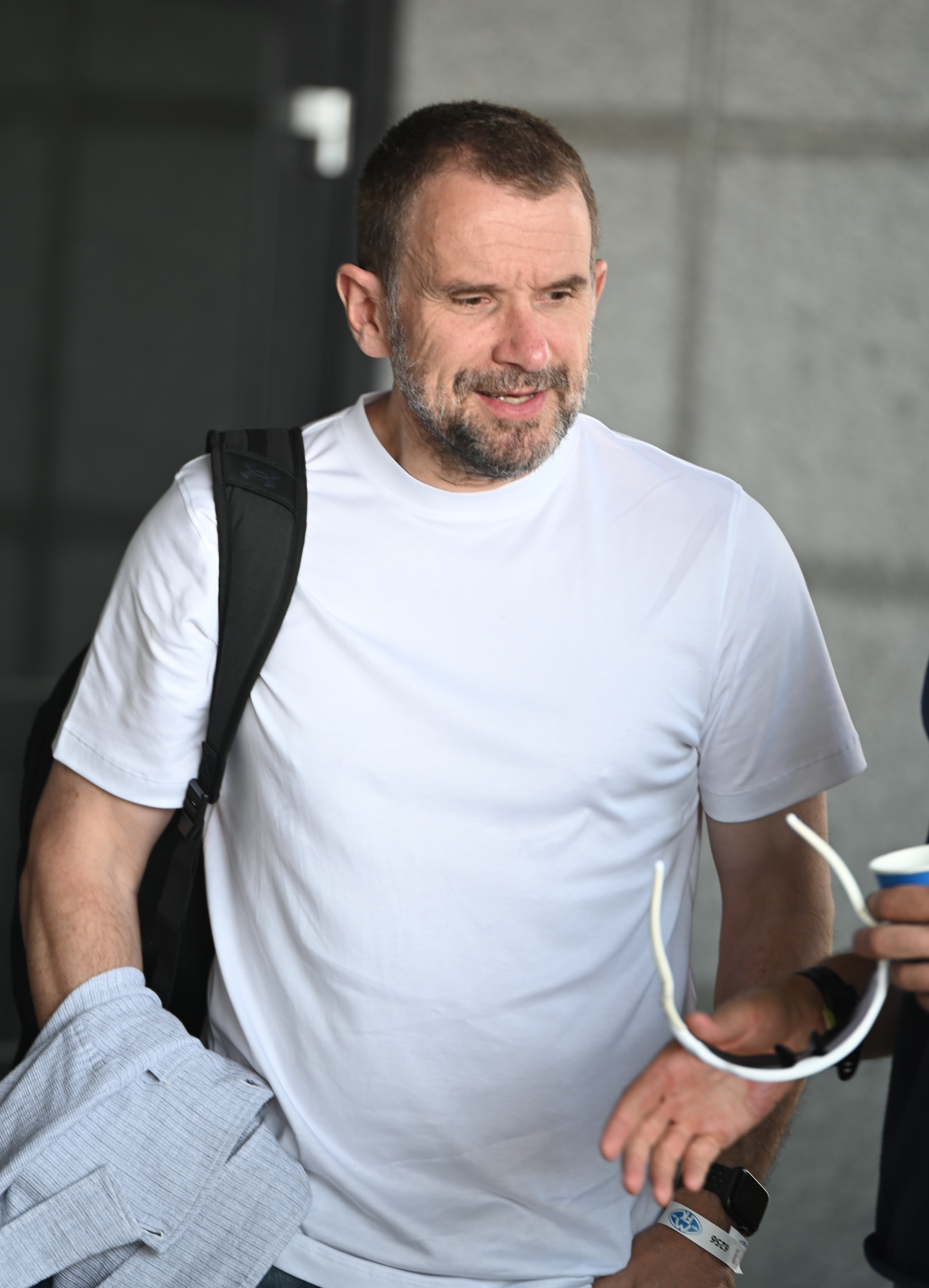
- Stavrum in 2026

Personal information
- Date of birth: 16 April 1972 (age 54)
- Place of birth: Kristiansund, Norway
- Height: 1.84 m (6 ft 0 in)
- Position: Striker

Senior career*
Years	Team	Apps	(Gls)
1990	Clausenengen		
1991–1993	Brann	25	(3)
1994–1996	Molde	73	(45)
1997	Stabæk	26	(7)
1998–1999	Helsingborgs IF	52	(29)
1999–2001	Aberdeen	53	(26)
2001–2002	Beşiktaş J.K.	18	(5)
2003–2004	Molde	27	(1)
Total		274	(116)

International career
1995	Norway	2	(0)

Managerial career
- 2005: Bærum SK
- 2006: Molde
- 2008–2010: Skeid
- * Club domestic league appearances and goals

Arild Stavrum (born 16 April 1972) is a Norwegian novelist, football coach and former player. His playing career included clubs as Brann, Molde, Stabæk, Helsingborg, Aberdeen and Beşiktaş.

== Playing career ==
Hailing from Kristiansund, he started his career in local club Clausenengen, and played for another two small clubs Jerv and Nordlandet. He was then picked up by Brann, and later by Molde. At Molde he formed a partnership with Ole Gunnar Solskjær and Ole Bjørn Sundgot known as "the three S'es". He then played one season for Stabæk before going abroad with Helsingborg in Sweden. Playing under former Molde coach Åge Hareide, Stavrum became Allsvenskan top scorer in the 1998 season. On 30 October 1999, he scored the only goal of the game when Helsingborgs IF defeated IFK Göteborg on away ground, winning Allsvenskan and the Swedish Championship. He then went to Scotland, joining Aberdeen.

In his first season, he made 32 appearances and scored 12 goals. He scored 17 goals in his second season with Aberdeen, which made him the second highest goalscorer in the 2000–01 Scottish Premier League. He was popular with the fans in Aberdeen, particularly after he cut and collected his trademark long hair, posting the offending follicles to local journalist Charlie Allan, who had previously claimed said locks were holding the Norwegian back. However, as a result of a contract clause that allowed him to move for a nominal fee, he signed for Beşiktaş in Turkey. This came as a bit of a surprise to Aberdeen, as he was pictured in the Turkish media with a Beşiktaş shirt before Aberdeen were actually aware that he would be leaving. His spell in Turkey was short-lived, as he left within a year. He returned to a second and final spell in the Norwegian league with Molde. He retired from a playing career following the 2004 season.

On the international level, Stavrum played for Norway twice, once against Israel in a friendly.

== Later career ==
In the 2005 season Stavrum was appointed coach of Second Division team Bærum SK. Having guided them to a respectable league position, Stavrum was hired by his old team Molde. However, he coached the team to relegation in 2006 and was sacked after the season. It was announced in December 2007 that Arild had signed a two-year coaching contract with Skeid of Oslo.

Outside of football, he has written for the media in Norway, as well as occasionally contributing to Scottish newspapers. In 2008, he made his debut as a fiction writer, with the novel 31 år på gress published by the Norwegian publishing house Oktober.

== Career statistics ==
Appearances and goals by club, season and competition
Club	Season	League			Scottish Cup		League Cup		Europe		Total	
Club	Season	Division	Apps	Goals	Apps	Goals	Apps	Goals	Apps	Goals	Apps	Goals
Aberdeen	1999–2000	Scottish Premier League	22	9	7	2	3	1	0	0	32	12
Aberdeen	2000–01	Scottish Premier League	31	17	3	0	0	0	1	0	35	17
Aberdeen	Total		53	26	10	2	3	1	1	0	67	29
