= List of Manchester City F.C. players (1–24 appearances) =

Manchester City Football Club, then known as Ardwick, first entered the Football Alliance in the 1891–92 season. In 1892, the Football League decided to expand, and invited the Alliance clubs to join; having chosen not to apply for entry into the First Division, Ardwick were placed in the newly formed Second Division. In April 1894 Ardwick became Manchester City, following the creation of Manchester City Football Club Ltd. as a limited company.

The club's first team have competed in numerous nationally and internationally organised competitions, and the 500+ players who have played fewer than 25 such matches, either as a member of the starting eleven or as a substitute, are listed below. Each player's details include the duration of his Manchester City career, his typical playing position while with the club, and the number of games played and goals scored in domestic league matches and in all senior competitive matches. Where applicable, the list also includes the national team for which the player was selected, and the number of senior international caps he won while playing for the club. The names are ordered first by number of appearances in total, then by date of debut. A number of players are current members of the first team squad or Elite Development Squad and may go onto to earn further appearances for the club in future.

== Key ==
Positions key
Pre-1960s		1960s–	
GK	Goalkeeper		
FB	Full back	DF	Defender
HB	Half-back	MF	Midfielder
FW	Forward		

Name Players who are currently contracted to Manchester City are highlighted in dark blue. Position

- Playing positions are listed according to the tactical formations that were employed at the time. Thus the change in the names of defensive and midfield positions reflects the tactical evolution that occurred from the 1960s onwards. The position listed is that in which the player played most frequently for the club.

Club career

- Club career is defined as the first and last calendar years in which the player appeared for the club in any of the competitions listed below, irrespective of how long the player was contracted to the club.

League appearances and League goals

- League appearances and goals comprise those in the Football Alliance, the Football League and the Premier League. Appearances in the 1939–40 Football League season, abandoned after three games because of the Second World War, are excluded.

Total appearances and Total goals

- Total appearances and goals comprise those in the Football Alliance, Football League (including test matches and play-offs), Premier League, FA Cup, Football League Cup, UEFA Champions League/European Cup, UEFA Europa League/UEFA Cup, FA Community Shield/Charity Shield, Associate Members' Cup, and defunct competitions the UEFA Cup Winners' Cup, Anglo-Italian Cup, Anglo-Italian League Cup, Texaco Cup, Anglo-Scottish Cup and Full Members' Cup. Matches in wartime competitions are excluded.

International selection

- Countries are listed only for players who have been selected for international football. Only the highest level of international competition is given.
- For players having played at full international level, the caps column counts the number of such appearances during his career with the club.

Last Update

- Statistics are correct as of end of 2025–26 season (30 May 2026).

== Players with fewer than 25 appearances ==
Players with fewer than 25 competitive appearances for Manchester City F.C.
Player	Position	Club career	League apps	League goals	Total apps	Total goals	International selection	Caps	Refs
George Heineman	HB	1929–1931	21	0	24	0	—	—	
Dennis Leman	MF	1973–1975	17	1	24	3	—	—	
Tony Cunningham	FW	1984–1985	18	1	24	4	—	—	
Gary Mason	MF	1998–1999	19	0	24	1	—	—	
Laurent Charvet	DF	2000–2001	23	0	24	0	—	—	
Rolando Bianchi	FW	2007–2008	19	4	24	5	Italy under-21	—	
Roque Santa Cruz	FW	2009–2013	20	3	24	4	Paraguay	30	
Jérôme Boateng	DF	2010–2011	16	0	24	0	Germany	8	
Percy Slater	FB	1900–1903	20	0	23	0	—	—	
Billy Cowan	FW	1926–1927	22	11	23	11	Scotland	0	
Wayne Clarke	FW	1990–1992	21	2	23	2	—	—	
David Rocastle	MF	1993–1994	21	2	23	2	England	0	
Andrew Cole	FW	2005–2006	22	9	23	10	England	0	
Hatem Trabelsi	DF	2006–2007	20	1	23	1	Tunisia	0	
Geovanni	MF	2007–2008	19	3	23	3	Brazil	0	
Eric Regan	HB	1893–1894	21	0	22	0	—	—	
Bob Hill	FW	1895–1897	21	9	22	9	—	—	
John Gunn	FW	1896–1897	21	4	22	4	—	—	
Joe Moffatt	HB	1903–1906	20	4	22	4	—	—	
Samuel Ashworth	FB	1903–1904	18	0	22	0	—	—	
Charles Webb	FW	1908	22	3	22	3	—	—	
Val Lawrence	HB	1911–1912	20	0	22	0	—	—	
Paddy Wrightson	FW	1930–1931	22	4	22	4	—	—	
Jimmy Constantine	FW	1946–1947	18	12	22	16	—	—	
Ralph Brand	FW	1965–1967	20	2	22	2	Scotland	0	
Tony Adcock	FW	1987–1988	15	5	22	9	—	—	
DaMarcus Beasley	MF	2006–2007	18	3	22	4	United States	1	
Zack Steffen	GK	2019–2024	2	0	22	0	United States	10	
Jimmy Yates	FW	1892–1894	20	9	21	9	—	—	
Robert Dearden	HB	1901–1908	21	0	21	0	—	—	
Ernest Goodwin	FW	1919–1920	20	3	21	5	—	—	
Fred Gregory	FW	1931–1934	21	2	21	2	—	—	
Alec Thurlow	GK	1946–1949	21	0	21	0	—	—	
Ron Futcher	FW	1978–1979	17	7	21	7	—	—	
Barry Silkman	MF	1979	19	3	21	3	—	—	
Carl Griffiths	FW	1993–1995	18	4	21	4	Wales B	—	
Neil Heaney	MF	1996–1998	18	1	21	2	England under-21	—	
Jason van Blerk	DF	1997–1998	19	0	21	0	Australia	0	
Stefan Savić	DF	2011–2012	11	1	21	1	Montenegro	9	
Stuart Munn	HB	1898–1900	20	0	20	0	—	—	
Jonathan Smith	FW	1910–1912	18	6	20	7	—	—	
Frank Carroll	HB	1920–1924	18	0	20	0	—	—	
Edward Bennett	FB	1926–1929	19	0	20	0	—	—	
Colin Rodger	FW	1936–1937	19	7	20	7	—	—	
Dick Neilson	HB	1936–1938	18	1	20	1	—	—	
William Murray	HB	1947–1949	20	1	20	1	—	—	
Jimmy Alison	HB	1949–1951	19	0	20	0	—	—	
Stan Bowles	MF	1967–1970	17	2	20	4	—	—	
Phil Henson	MF	1972–1974	16	0	20	0	—	—	
Nick Fenton	DF	1998–1999	15	0	20	0	—	—	
Ishmael Miller	FW	2006–2007	17	0	20	0	—	—	
Andreas Isaksson	GK	2006–2008	19	0	20	0	Sweden	17	
Marc Guéhi	DF	2026–	15	1	20	2	—	—	
David Russell	HB	1892–1893	17	3	19	3	—	—	
Jack Walker	FB	1894–1895	19	1	19	1	—	—	
Paul Aimson	FW	1961–1964	16	4	19	6	—	—	
Dragoslav Stepanović	DF	1979–1980	15	0	19	0	Yugoslavia	0	
John Ryan	MF	1982	19	0	19	0	—	—	
Gary Fleming	DF	1989	14	0	19	0	Northern Ireland	2	
Adie Mike	FW	1992–1994	16	2	19	2	England under-21	—	
Albert Riera	MF	2006	15	1	19	1	Spain	0	
Scott Sinclair	MF	2012–2015	13	0	19	0	England under-21	—	
Fred Steele	FB	1893–1894	17	1	18	1	—	—	
Robert Jones	HB	1894–1895	18	0	18	0	Wales	0	
Henry Smith	FB	1894–1895	18	0	18	0	—	—	
Charlie Bannister	HB	1896–1897	18	2	18	2	—	—	
Harry Rowley	FW	1932–1933	18	4	18	4	—	—	
Keiller McCullough	HB	1935–1936	17	1	18	1	Ireland	3	
Willo Flood	MF	2003–2006	14	1	18	2	Republic of Ireland under-21	—	
Ousmane Dabo	MF	2006–2008	13	0	18	0	France	0	
Joseph Nash	HB	1894–1895	17	1	17	1	—	—	
Patrick Leonard	FW	1897–1898; 1899	16	5	17	5	—	—	
John Chaplin	FB	1910–1911	15	0	17	0	—	—	
Malcolm Comrie	FW	1932–1934	17	1	17	1	—	—	
Peter Bodak	MF	1982–1983	14	1	17	1	—	—	
Paul Cooper	GK	1989	15	0	17	0	—	—	
Kåre Ingebrigtsen	MF	1993–1994	15	0	17	3	Norway	4	
Darren Wassall	DF	1996	15	0	17	0	—	—	
Murtaz Shelia	DF	1997–1998	15	2	17	2	Georgia	5	
James Trafford	GK	2025–2026	4	0	17	0	England	2	
Tommy Little	FW	1894–1895	16	5	16	5	—	—	
Sid Scott	HB	1919–1921	15	0	16	0	—	—	
James Nicholls	GK	1932–1933	16	0	16	0	—	—	
Eric Eastwood	HB	1938–1946	16	0	16	0	—	—	
Jimmy Conway	MF	1976–1977	13	1	16	1	Republic of Ireland	1	
Martin O'Neill	MF	1981–1982	13	0	16	0	Northern Ireland	1	
Sammy McIlroy	MF	1985–1986	13	1	16	1	Northern Ireland	10	
Martin Phillips	MF	1996	15	0	16	0	—	—	
Robert Taylor	FW	1999–2000	16	5	16	5	—	—	
Charlie Ditchfield	FB	1896	12	1	15	1	—	—	
Daniel Hurst	FW	1901–1902	15	0	15	0	—	—	
Hugh Morgan	FW	1901–1902	12	1	15	2	Scotland	0	
Alex Young	FW	1911–1912	13	2	15	2	Scotland	0	
Paddy McGuire	FB	1913–1914	15	0	15	0	—	—	
Wilf Woodcock	FW	1920–1921	15	2	15	2	—	—	
George Robertson	FB	1927–1932	14	0	15	0	—	—	
Frank Corbett	FB	1932–1936	15	0	15	0	—	—	
Jimmy Gunning	FW	1950–1953	13	0	15	0	—	—	
Roy Gratrix	DF	1964–1965	15	0	15	0	—	—	
Micky Horswill	MF	1974–1975	14	0	15	0	—	—	
Jeff Clarke	DF	1974–1975	13	0	15	0	—	—	
Tony Grealish	MF	1986–1987	11	0	15	0	Republic of Ireland	0	
Mike Stowell	GK	1988	14	0	15	0	—	—	
Kelvin Etuhu	FW	2007–2009	10	1	15	1	—	—	
Tal Ben Haim	DF	2008–2009	9	0	15	0	Israel	10	
Sylvinho	DF	2009–2010	10	0	15	1	Brazil	0	
Angeliño	DF	2012–2018; 2019–2021	6	0	15	0	Spain under-21	—	
Brahim Díaz	MF	2016–2019	5	0	15	2	Spain under-21	—	
John McLeod	FW	1935–1936	12	9	14	11	—	—	
Joe Rogers	HB	1936–1938	11	1	14	1	—	—	
Keith Marsden	FW	1955–1957	14	1	14	1	—	—	
Graham Chadwick	HB	1962–1963	12	0	14	0	—	—	
Barry Stobart	FW	1964	14	1	14	1	—	—	
Barney Daniels	FW	1974–1975	13	2	14	2	—	—	
Billy Lewis	FW	1896–1897	12	4	13	4	Wales	2	
Robert Benzie	HB	1925–1927	13	0	13	0	—	—	
Tommy Capel	HB	1947	9	2	13	4	—	—	
Ron Powell	GK	1949	12	0	13	0	—	—	
Gordon Davies	FW	1952–1955	13	5	13	5	—	—	
Ken Whitfield	HB	1953	13	3	13	3	—	—	
Mike Batty	HB	1963–1965	13	0	13	0	—	—	
Maicon	DF	2012	9	0	13	0	Brazil	0	
Gerry Taggart	DF	1989	12	1	13	1	Northern Ireland	0	
Mike Quigley	FW	1991–1993	13	0	13	0	—	—	
Paul Beesley	DF	1997–1998	13	0	13	0	—	—	
Kakhaber Tskhadadze	DF	1998	12	2	13	3	Georgia	0	
Dickson Etuhu	MF	2001	12	0	13	0	Nigeria	0	
Harry Stones	GK	1893–1894	12	0	12	0	—	—	
A Bennett	FW	1893–1894	12	6	12	6	—	—	
Richard Jones	FW	1901–1902	9	2	12	2	—	—	
Robert Etherington	FW	1922–1923	12	0	12	0	—	—	
Darren Beckford	FW	1984–1987	11	0	12	0	—	—	
Alfons Groenendijk	MF	1993–1994	9	0	12	0	—	—	
Valeri Bojinov	FW	2007–2010	11	1	12	1	Bulgaria	11	
Andrew Cowie	FW	1898	11	0	11	0	—	—	
William Hall	GK	1906	11	0	11	0	—	—	
Frank Buckley	HB	1907–1908	11	0	11	0	England	0	
Augustus Beeby	GK	1911–1912	11	0	11	0	—	—	
Tommy Lamph	HB	1919	11	0	11	0	—	—	
Syd Gibbons	HB	1927–1930	10	0	11	0	—	—	
Alf Horne	FW	1928	11	2	11	2	—	—	
Henry Race	FW	1930–1933	10	3	11	3	—	—	
Robert Syme	FW	1932–1934	11	2	11	2	—	—	
Billy Sowden	FW	1952–1953	11	2	11	2	—	—	
Paul Hince	FW	1967	7	4	11	4	—	—	
Mick Docherty	DF	1976	8	0	11	0	—	—	
Andrei Kanchelskis	DF	2001	10	1	11	1	Russia	0	
Tom Forrester	FW	1892–1894	10	2	10	2	—	—	
John Christie	FB	1905–1907	10	0	10	0	—	—	
William Kelly	FW	1911–1913	10	0	10	0	—	—	
Billy Gaughan	FW	1914	10	0	10	0	—	—	
Bob Dennison	FW	1925–1926	8	4	10	4	—	—	
Ron Dellow	FW	1935	10	0	10	0	—	—	
Billy Owen	FW	1935–1936	10	3	10	3	—	—	
Andy Kerr	FB	1959	10	0	10	0	—	—	
Trevor Christie	FW	1986	9	0	10	0	—	—	
Lee Peacock	FW	1999–2000	8	0	10	0	—	—	
Christian Negouai	MF	2001–2004	6	1	10	1	—	—	
Kasper Schmeichel	GK	2007–2008	8	0	10	0	Denmark	0	
Abdul Razak	MF	2011–2013	5	0	10	0	Ivory Coast	4	
Jack Angus	FW	1892	7	3	9	3	—	—	
Felix Mooney	FW	1892–1893	9	4	9	4	—	—	
Adam Carson	FW	1893	7	3	9	3	—	—	
James Scotson	FW	1901–1902	8	3	9	3	—	—	
Fred Bevan	FW	1901–1903	8	1	9	1	—	—	
Joby Godfrey	FW	1919–1920	9	1	9	1	—	—	
John Allan	FW	1927–1928	8	1	9	1	—	—	
Bill Ridding	FW	1930–1931	9	4	9	4	—	—	
Willis Gregg	FB	1937–1938	9	0	9	0	—	—	
Harry Jackson	FW	1946–1947	8	2	9	3	—	—	
Len Woodroffe	FW	1946–1947	9	1	9	1	—	—	
Ray Gill	FB	1949–1950	8	0	9	0	—	—	
Trevor Ogden	FW	1964–1965	9	3	9	3	—	—	
Jeff Johnson	MF	1971	6	0	9	0	—	—	
Robert Hopkins	MF	1986	7	1	9	1	—	—	
Kevin Langley	MF	1987	9	0	9	0	—	—	
Scott Hiley	DF	1996	9	0	9	0	—	—	
Tony Scully	MF	1997	9	0	9	0	Republic of Ireland B	—	
Chris Greenacre	FW	1997–1998	8	1	9	1	—	—	
George Weah	FW	2000	7	1	9	4	Liberia	0?	
Nery Castillo	FW	2008	7	0	9	0	Mexico	2	
Aleix García	MF	2016–2020	4	0	9	1	Spain under-21	—	
Ernie Pickford	FW	1893–1894	8	3	8	3	—	—	
Joshua Hargreaves	FW	1893–1894	8	0	8	0	—	—	
Henry Foster	FW	1896–1898	7	1	8	1	—	—	
Tommy Chappell	GK	1897–1898	8	0	8	0	—	—	
Frank Barrett	GK	1901–1902	5	0	8	0	Scotland	0	
John Miller	FW	1902	8	2	8	2	—	—	
Frank Pearson	FW	1903–1905	7	2	8	2	—	—	
Willie Gould	FW	1910–1911	8	2	8	2	—	—	
John Nelson	FW	1911	8	0	8	0	—	—	
Albert Keary	FW	1911–1912	8	1	8	1	—	—	
Dick Finnigan	GK	1926	8	0	8	0	Wales	0	
Les Roberts	FW	1931	8	2	8	2	—	—	
Verdi Godwin	FW	1948–1949	8	3	8	3	—	—	
John McClelland	FW	1956–1958	8	2	8	2	—	—	
Steve Carter	MF	1971	6	2	8	2	—	—	
Gary Jackson	MF	1982	8	0	8	0	—	—	
Gary Buckley	MF	1980–1981	6	0	8	0	—	—	
Ian Davies	DF	1982–1983	7	0	8	0	—	—	
Simon Rodger	DF	1996	8	1	8	1	—	—	
Dalian Atkinson	FW	1997	8	2	8	2	England B	—	
Barry Conlon	FW	1997–1998	7	0	8	0	Republic of Ireland under-21	—	
Djamel Belmadi	MF	2003	8	0	8	0	Algeria	1	
Tosin Adarabioyo	DF	2016–2020	0	0	8	0	England under-19	—	
Taylor Harwood-Bellis	DF	2019–2024	0	0	8	1	England under-21	—	
D Robertson	FW	1893–1894	7	3	7	3	—	—	
William Egan	FW	1893–1894	7	0	7	0	Wales	0	
Mitchell Calvey	FW	1894	7	5	7	5	—	—	
George Hutchinson	GK	1894	7	0	7	0	—	—	
Howard Harvey	FW	1900–1901	7	1	7	1	—	—	
Alex Davidson	FW	1900	7	1	7	1	—	—	
Robert Hunter	FB	1901–1902	7	0	7	0	—	—	
Harry Chapelhow	FW	1909	7	0	7	0	—	—	
Alex Donaldson	FW	1923–1924	7	0	7	0	Scotland	0	
Billy Wardle	FW	1937–1938	6	0	7	0	—	—	
Jim Hope	FW	1946	7	0	7	0	—	—	
Ray Haddington	FW	1950–1951	6	4	7	4	—	—	
Roy Faulkner	FW	1955–1956	7	4	7	4	—	—	
Alan Kirkman	FW	1957–1959	7	6	7	6	—	—	
Chris Jones	FW	1966–1968	7	2	7	2	—	—	
Stuart Lee	FW	1979–1980	7	2	7	2	—	—	
Paul Sugrue	FW	1980–1981	6	0	7	0	—	—	
Duncan Davidson	FW	1983	6	1	7	1	—	—	
Mike Walsh	DF	1983–1984	4	0	7	0	—	—	
Ken McNaught	DF	1984–1985	7	0	7	0	—	—	
Nigel Johnson	DF	1985–1986	4	0	7	0	—	—	
Carl Bradshaw	DF	1988–1989	5	0	7	0	—	—	
Simon Colosimo	DF	2001	6	0	7	0	Australia	0	
Kevin Stuhr Ellegaard	GK	2003–2004	4	0	7	0	Denmark under-21	—	
David Pizarro	MF	2012	5	0	7	1	Chile	0	
Tommy Doyle	MF	2019–2024	1	0	7	0	England under-21	—	
Max Alleyne	DF	2025–	2	0	7	1	—	—	
H Saddington	FW	1893–1894	6	0	6	0	—	—	
Alec Wallace	FW	1894–1895	6	1	6	1	—	—	
Harry Tompkinson	FW	1894–1895	6	1	6	1	—	—	
Peter Meechan	FB	1900–1901	6	0	6	0	Scotland	0	
Billy Lyon	HB	1903	6	0	6	0	—	—	
James Whittaker	FW	1905–1906	6	1	6	1	—	—	
Frank Davies	GK	1906–1909	6	0	6	0	—	—	
John Brown	FW	1909	6	0	6	0	—	—	
Robert Davies	HB	1911	6	0	6	0	Wales amateur	—	
Joe Spottiswood	FW	1913–1914	6	0	6	0	—	—	
Fred Sugden	FB	1919–1920	6	0	6	0	—	—	
Joe Edelston	HB	1920	6	0	6	0	—	—	
Bob Smith	HB	1923–1924	6	0	6	0	—	—	
Bobby MacDonald	FB	1961–1962	5	0	6	0	—	—	
David Kerr	MF	1993–1995	6	0	6	0	—	—	
Steffen Karl	MF	1994	6	1	6	1	Germany under-21	—	
Ronnie Ekelund	MF	1995–1996	4	0	6	0	Denmark under-21	—	
Vic Corbett	FB	1933–1934	5	0	6	0	—	—	
Fred Howe	FW	1938	6	5	6	5	—	—	
Billy Bootle	FW	1946–1949	5	0	6	0	—	—	
Steve Fleet	GK	1957–1962	5	0	6	0	—	—	
Micky Brennan	FW	1971–1973	4	0	6	0	—	—	
Tony Whelan	FW	1973–1974	6	0	6	0	—	—	
Bobby Shinton	MF	1979–1980	5	0	6	0	—	—	
Gordon Dalziel	FW	1983–1984	5	0	6	0	—	—	
David Johnson	FW	1984	6	1	6	1	England	0	
Barry Siddall	GK	1986	6	0	6	0	—	—	
Carl Shutt	FW	1994	6	0	6	0	—	—	
Peter Beardsley	FW	1998	6	0	6	0	England	0	
Chris Shuker	FW	2001–2002	5	0	6	1	—	—	
Daniel Van Buyten	DF	2004	5	0	6	0	Belgium	0	
Liam Delap	FW	2019–2024	2	0	6	1	England under-19	—	
Jahmai Simpson-Pusey	DF	2025–	2	0	6	0	—	—	
Divine Mukasa	MF	2025–	2	0	6	0	—	—	
Alec Gillies	FW	1896	3	0	5	0	—	—	
Thomas Porteous	FB	1896	5	0	5	0	England	0	
John Henderson	FW	1901–1902	5	1	5	1	—	—	
Albert Fisher	FW	1906	5	2	5	2	—	—	
Rowland Codling	HB	1910	5	0	5	0	—	—	
William Garner	HB	1913–1915	5	0	5	0	—	—	
Albert Fairclough	FW	1913–1919	5	1	5	1	—	—	
Peter Fairclough	HB	1915–1920	5	0	5	0	—	—	
Jock Henderson	HB	1915–1919	5	0	5	0	—	—	
Leo Bradford	FW	1925	5	1	5	1	—	—	
Arthur Bacon	FW	1928–1929	5	1	5	1	—	—	
Len Fletcher	FW	1933–1935	5	1	5	1	—	—	
Dennis Fidler	FW	1957–1959	5	1	5	1	—	—	
Chris Glennon	FW	1969–1970	4	0	5	0	—	—	
Lee Briscoe	DF	1998	5	1	5	1	—	—	
Vladimír Weiss	MF	2009–2010	1	0	5	1	Slovakia	23	
Greg Cunningham	MF	2010	2	0	5	0	Republic of Ireland	2	
Marcos Lopes	MF	2013–2015	0	0	5	1	Portugal under-21	—	
Arijanet Muric	GK	2017–2022	0	0	5	0	Kosovo	—	
Adrián Bernabé	MF	2018–2021	0	0	5	0	Spain under-17	—	
Harry Angus	FW	1892	3	1	4	1	—	—	
Robert Robinson	FW	1893	4	2	4	2	—	—	
J Baker	HB	1892–1894	4	1	4	1	—	—	
A McDowell	HB	1894	4	0	4	0	—	—	
Hughie Clifford	HB	1895	4	1	4	1	—	—	
John Millar	HB	1896	2	0	4	0	—	—	
David Tait	HB	1896	4	2	4	2	—	—	
James Tonge	FW	1897–1900	4	0	4	0	—	—	
Herbert Dartnell	FW	1900–1901	4	0	4	0	—	—	
Herbert Broomfield	GK	1908–1909	4	0	4	0	—	—	
Alf Ford	FW	1922	4	0	4	0	—	—	
Bill Harper	GK	1924	4	0	4	0	—	—	
James McCourt	HB	1924	4	0	4	0	—	—	
John Payne	FW	1932–1934	4	1	4	1	—	—	
Bobby Regan	FW	1936	4	0	4	0	—	—	
Raymond Freeman	FW	1937–1939	4	1	4	1	—	—	
Rex Clayton	FW	1937–1938	3	2	4	2	—	—	
Edward McLeod	FW	1939	4	2	4	2	—	—	
Earl Barrett	DF	1986	3	0	4	0	England	0	
John Burridge	GK	1995	4	0	4	0	—	—	
Michael Branch	FW	1998	4	0	4	0	England under-21	—	
Egil Østenstad	FW	2001	4	0	4	0	Norway	0	
Owen Hargreaves	MF	2011–2012	1	0	4	1	England	0	
José Ángel Pozo	FW	2014–2015	1	0	4	1	Spain under-19	—	
Manu García	MF	2015–2019	1	0	4	1	—	—	
Bersant Celina	DF	2015–2018	1	0	4	0	Kosovo	—	
Vitor Reis	DF	2025–	1	0	4	0	—	—	
William Lambie	FW	1892	3	1	3	1	Scotland	0	
Jimmie Robertson	FW	1896	3	2	3	2	—	—	
William Townley	FW	1896	3	0	3	0	England	0	
L Robinson	FW	1896	3	2	3	2	—	—	
Frank Hesham	FW	1897–1901	3	0	3	0	—	—	
Julius Gregory	FB	1905–1906	3	0	3	0	—	—	
Tommy Farrell	FW	1907	3	0	3	0	—	—	
Jack Yuill	FW	1909	3	1	3	1	—	—	
George Furr	FW	1910	3	0	3	0	—	—	
Reginald Humphreys	FB	1910–1911	3	0	3	0	—	—	
George Brooks	FW	1911–1912	3	1	3	1	—	—	
James Abbott	FW	1913	3	2	3	2	—	—	
Joe Reid	FW	1919–1920	3	1	3	1	—	—	
George Gray	HB	1919–1921	3	0	3	0	—	—	
John Leyland	HB	1920–1921	3	0	3	0	—	—	
George Albinson	HB	1921	3	0	3	0	—	—	
Jimmy Mulligan	FB	1922	3	0	3	1	Ireland	1	
Jack Doran	FW	1922	3	0	3	1	Ireland	0	
Fred Appleton	FB	1926–1927	2	0	3	0	—	—	
Clifford Foster	FW	1927–1928	3	0	3	0	—	—	
Leo Dunne	FB	1933–1935	3	0	3	0	Republic of Ireland	0	
Norman Wright	FW	1934–1935	3	1	3	1	—	—	
Norman Lloyd	HB	1934	3	0	3	0	—	—	
Jim Cassidy	FW	1935–1936	3	0	3	0	—	—	
Bill Blackshaw	FW	1939	3	0	3	0	—	—	
Bill Jones	FW	1949–1950	3	0	3	0	—	—	
Billy Hogan	FW	1949	3	0	3	0	—	—	
Peter Horridge	FB	1958–1959	3	0	3	0	—	—	
Billy Haydock	FW	1960	3	1	3	1	—	—	
Bobby Cunliffe	FW	1963	3	1	3	1	—	—	
Jimmy Mundy	MF	1969	3	0	3	0	—	—	
Mike Lester	MF	1973–1976	3	0	3	0	—	—	
Chris Jones	FW	1982	3	0	3	0	England under-21	—	
Jamie Hoyland	MF	1983–1985	2	0	3	1	—	—	
Bobby Mimms	GK	1987	3	0	3	0	England under-21	—	
Ashley Ward	FW	1989–1990	1	0	3	0	—	—	
Danny Hoekman	MF	1991	1	0	3	0	—	—	
Simon Tracey	GK	1994	3	0	3	0	—	—	
Dave Morley	DF	1997	3	1	3	1	—	—	
Lee Mills	FW	2000	3	0	3	0	—	—	
Chris Killen	FW	2001–2002	3	0	3	0	New Zealand	13	
Shaleum Logan	DF	2007–2010	1	0	3	0	—	—	
Abdisalam Ibrahim	MF	2010–2014	1	0	3	0	Norway under-23	—	
Márton Fülöp	GK	2010	3	0	3	0	Hungary	0	
Karim Rekik	DF	2011–2015	1	0	3	0	Netherlands under-19	—	
Pablo Maffeo	DF	2016–2018	0	0	3	0	Spain under-19	—	
Patrick Roberts	MF	2015–2022	1	0	3	0	England under-20	—	
Claudio Gomes	MF	2018–2022	0	0	3	0	France under-19	—	
Felix Nmecha	MF	2018–2021	0	0	3	0	England under-19	—	
CJ Egan-Riley	DF	2021–2022	1	0	3	0			
Luke Mbete	DF	2021–2026	0	0	3	0			
Josh Wilson-Esbrand	DF	2021–	0	0	3	0			
Micah Hamilton	MF	2023–2024	0	0	3	1			
Claudio Echeverri	MF	2025–	1	0	3	1	—	—	
A Jones	FW	1893	2	1	2	1	—	—	
Joe O'Brien	FW	1893	2	0	2	0	—	—	
J Stenson	FB	1894	2	0	2	0	—	—	
Archibald Ferguson	FB	1894	2	0	2	0	—	—	
John Hughes	FW	1894	2	0	2	0	—	—	
Tom McConnell	FW	1896	2	0	2	0	—	—	
William Baldwin	FW	1906–1908	2	0	2	0	—	—	
Bruce Rankin	FW	1907	2	0	2	0	—	—	
Tommy Callaghan	OR	1908	2	0	2	0	—	—	
Patsy Hendren	FW	1909	2	0	2	0	—	—	
Francis James	FW	1909–1910	2	0	2	0	—	—	
Harry Brown	HB	1910	2	0	2	0	—	—	
George Webb	FW	1912	2	0	2	0	England	0	
Len Jobling	FW	1913	2	0	2	0	—	—	
Andie Newton	FB	1919	2	0	2	0	—	—	
Frank Knowles	HB	1919	2	0	2	0	—	—	
Fred Lievesley	FW	1919–1921	2	0	2	0	—	—	
Harry Jarvis	HB	1920	2	0	2	0	England schoolboys	—	
Jimmy Thompson	FW	1921	2	0	2	0	—	—	
Tommy Ingham	FW	1922	2	1	2	1	—	—	
Tommy Gibson	FW	1927	2	2	2	2	—	—	
Tom Smelt	FW	1927	2	1	2	1	—	—	
Jack Harrison	FW	1929	2	1	2	1	—	—	
Foster Hedley	FW	1930	2	2	2	2	—	—	
Cliff Walmsley	GK	1932	2	0	2	0	—	—	
Peter Percival	FW	1934	2	0	2	0	—	—	
John Shadwell	HB	1935	2	0	2	0	—	—	
Jack Robinson	GK	1938–1946	2	0	2	0	—	—	
Peter Robinson	HB	1946	1	0	2	0	—	—	
Jimmy Rudd	FW	1946	2	0	2	0	—	—	
Fred Smith	FW	1952	2	1	2	1	—	—	
George Thompson	GK	1956	2	0	2	0	—	—	
Bert Lister	FW	1958–1959	2	0	2	0	—	—	
Peter Leigh	FB	1962	2	0	2	0	—	—	
Derek Hodgkinson	FW	1963	1	1	2	1	—	—	
Derek Panter	FW	1964	1	0	2	0	—	—	
Ron Frost	MF	1964	2	1	2	1	—	—	
John Clay	MF	1967	2	0	2	0	—	—	
Billy Telford	FW	1975	1	0	2	0	—	—	
Terry Park	MF	1983	2	0	2	0	—	—	
Ivan Golac	DF	1983	2	0	2	0	Yugoslavia	0	
Graeme Sinclair	DF	1984	1	0	2	0	—	—	
Justin Fashanu	FW	1989	2	0	2	0	—	—	
Scott Thomas	MF	1995	2	0	2	0	—	—	
Giuseppe Mazzarelli	DF	1996	2	0	2	0	Switzerland	0	
Mark Robins	FW	1999	2	0	2	0	England under-21	—	
Alioune Touré	FW	2001	1	0	2	0	France under-21	—	
Leon Mike	FW	2001	2	0	2	0	England under-18	—	
Mikkel Bischoff	DF	2002–2003	1	0	2	0	Denmark under-21	—	
Árni Gautur Arason	GK	2004	0	0	2	0	Iceland		
Stephen Elliott	FW	2004	2	0	2	0	Republic of Ireland	0	
Ronald Waterreus	GK	2004	0	0	2	0	Netherlands	0	
Matt Mills	DF	2006	2	0	2	0	England under-19	—	
Alex Nimely	FW	2010–2014	1	0	2	0	England under-20	—	
Luca Scapuzzi	FW	2011–2014	0	0	2	0	—	—	
Denis Suárez	MF	2011–2013	0	0	2	0	Spain under-20	—	
Cameron Humphreys	DF	2016–2019	0	0	2	0	England under-18	—	
Philippe Sandler	DF	2018–2022	0	0	2	0	Netherlands under-19	—	
Scott Carson	GK	2019–2025	1	0	2	0		—	
Kayky	FW	2021–2025	1	0	2	0			
Roméo Lavia	MF	2021–2022	0	0	2	0	Belgium under-21	—	
Máximo Perrone	MF	2023–2025	1	0	2	0	—	—	
Jacob Wright	DF	2023–2025	0	0	2	0	—	—	
Divin Mubama	FW	2025–	1	0	2	1	—	—	
Ryan McAidoo	DF	2025–	0	0	2	1	—	—	
James Cairns	HB	1893	1	0	1	0	—	—	
Wilmot Turner	FW	1893	1	0	1	0	—	—	
George Armitt	FW	1893	1	0	1	0	—	—	
William Willey	FW	1894	1	0	1	0	—	—	
Alf Edge	FW	1894	1	0	1	0	—	—	
Arthur Spittle	FW	1894	1	1	1	1	—	—	
Willie Maley	HB	1896	1	0	1	0	Scotland	0	
Arthur McCabe	FW	1896	1	0	1	0	—	—	
Jock Espie	HB	1896	1	0	1	0	—	—	
William Paterson	FW	1896	1	0	1	0	—	—	
Jim Platt	FW	1896	1	0	1	0	—	—	
Jock Wilson	FB	1898	1	0	1	0	—	—	
Tommy Clare	FB	1898	1	0	1	0	England	0	
Herbert Hallows	HB	1901	1	0	1	0	—	—	
Walter Cox	GK	1901	1	0	1	0	—	—	
Lionel Watson	FW	1901	1	0	1	0	—	—	
J Dennison	FW	1904	1	2	1	2	—	—	
William Robinson	HB	1904	1	0	1	0	—	—	
James Young	HB	1905	1	0	1	0	—	—	
Horace Blew	FB	1906	1	0	1	0	Wales	0	
George Hamblett	HB	1907	1	0	1	0	—	—	
Samuel Eyres	FW	1907	1	1	1	1	—	—	
Ernest Bannister	HB	1908	1	0	1	0	—	—	
Ernest Hitchcock	FW	1909	1	0	1	0	—	—	
Eversley Mansfield	FW	1909	1	0	1	0	—	—	
David Ramsey	HB	1909	1	0	1	0	—	—	
Jack Swann	GK	1909	1	0	1	0	—	—	
D Coupe	FB	1909	1	0	1	0	—	—	
George Salt	FW	1911	1	0	1	0	—	—	
Joe Bentley	HB	1912	1	0	1	0	—	—	
J Eden	FB	1912	1	0	1	0	—	—	
Peter Gartland	FB	1914	1	0	1	0	—	—	
Jack Hall	FW	1915	1	0	1	0	—	—	
Stanley Royle	FW	1922	1	0	1	0	—	—	
Harry Pearson	FW	1922	1	0	1	0	—	—	
Albert Simpson	FW	1922	1	0	1	0	—	—	
George Utley	HB	1922	1	0	1	0	England	0	
Alex Leslie	HB	1924	1	0	1	0	—	—	
John Phillips	GK	1925	1	0	1	0	Wales youth	—	
Fred Gorringe	FW	1928	1	2	1	2	—	—	
Frank Higgs	GK	1932	1	0	1	0	—	—	
Jimmy Naylor	HB	1933	1	0	1	0	—	—	
John Allmark	FW	1937	1	0	1	0	—	—	
Ronnie Hodgson	HB	1946	1	0	1	0	—	—	
Murdoch McCormack	FW	1947	1	0	1	0	—	—	
Tommy Oakes	FW	1947	1	0	1	0	—	—	
Ken Oxford	GK	1948	1	0	1	0	—	—	
John Greenwood	HB	1949	1	0	1	0	—	—	
Derek Williams	GK	1952	1	0	1	0	—	—	
Eric Webster	HB	1953	1	0	1	0	—	—	
Phil Woosnam	FW	1953	1	0	1	0	—	—	
David Davidson	HB	1953	1	0	1	0	—	—	
Hugh Murray	FW	1956	1	0	1	0	—	—	
Ken Taylor	FB	1958	1	0	1	0	—	—	
Jimmy Pennington	FW	1959	1	0	1	0	—	—	
Bobby McAlinden	MF	1963	0	0	1	0	—	—	
Howard White	DF	1971	1	0	1	0	—	—	
Keith Hanvey	DF	1971	0	0	1	0	—	—	
Andy Elliot	MF	1982	1	0	1	0	—	—	
Ronnie Hildersley	MF	1983	1	0	1	0	—	—	
Dominic Sullivan	MF	1983	0	0	1	0	—	—	
Ian Thompstone	MF	1988	1	1	1	1	—	—	
Neil Lennon	DF	1988	1	0	1	0	Northern Ireland	0	
Bill Williams	DF	1988	1	0	1	0	—	—	
Ronnie Mauge	MF	1991	1	0	1	0	Trinidad and Tobago	0	
Ray Kelly	FW	1997	1	0	1	0	—	—	
Alan Bailey	FW	1998	0	0	1	0	—	—	
Steve Rimmer	DF	1998	0	0	1	0	—	—	
Terry Dunfield	MF	2001	0	0	1	0	Canada	0	
Tyrone Mears	DF	2002	1	0	1	0	—	—	
Glenn Whelan	MF	2003	0	0	1	0	Republic of Ireland	0	
Jonathan D'Laryea	MF	2004	0	0	1	0	—	—	
Hussein Yasser	MF	2005	0	0	1	0	Qatar	0	
Djamel Abdoun	MF	2007	0	0	1	0	Algeria	0	
Sam Williamson	DF	2008	1	0	1	0	—	—	
Gláuber	DF	2009	1	0	1	0	Brazil	0	
Stuart Taylor	GK	2010	0	0	1	0	England under-21	—	
Gunnar Nielsen	GK	2010	1	0	1	0	Faroe Islands	6	
Ben Mee	DF	2010	0	0	1	0	England under-21	—	
Javan Vidal	DF	2010	0	0	1	0	England under-20	—	
John Guidetti	FW	2010–2015	0	0	1	0	Sweden	1	
Chris Chantler	MF	2010	0	0	1	0	—	—	
Ryan McGivern	DF	2011	1	0	1	0	Northern Ireland	19	
Reece Wabara	DF	2011	1	0	1	0	England under-20	—	
Jérémy Hélan	DF	2012	0	0	1	0	France under-19	—	
Emyr Huws	MF	2014	0	0	1	0	Wales	1	
Bruno Zuculini	MF	2014	0	0	1	0	Argentina under-20	—	
George Evans	MF	2015	0	0	1	0	England under-19	—	
David Faupala	FW	2016–2018	0	0	1	1	France under-18	—	
Brandon Barker	MF	2016–2019	0	0	1	0	England under-20	—	
Ian Poveda	FW	2016–2019	0	0	1	0	England under-19	—	
Tom Dele-Bashiru	MF	2017–2019	0	0	1	0	Nigeria under-20	—	
Samuel Edozie	FW	2021–2022	0	0	1	0			
Ben Knight	DF	2021–2024	0	0	1	0			
Finley Burns	DF	2021–2026	0	0	1	0			
Shea Charles	DF	2022–2023	0	0	1	0	Northern Ireland	6	
Mahamadou Susoho	MF	2023–2026	0	0	1	0			
Kaden Braithwaite	DF	2025–	0	0	1	0	—	—	
Charlie Gray	MF	2025–	0	0	1	0	—	—	
Jadon Heskey	FW	2025–	0	0	1	0	—	—	
Stephen Mfuni	DF	2025–	0	0	1	0	—	—	
Reigan Heskey	FW	2025–2026	0	0	1	0	—	—	

== See also ==
- List of Manchester City F.C. players (25–99 appearances)
- List of Manchester City F.C. players with more than 100 appearances
  (Also includes winners of the Player of the Year award)
