= 2007–08 Aberdeen F.C. season =

Aberdeen
2007–08 season
- Chairman: Stewart Milne
- Manager: Jimmy Calderwood
- Stadium: Pittodrie Stadium
- Scottish Premier League: 4th
- Scottish Cup: Semi-finals
- League Cup: Semi-finals
- UEFA Europa League: Round of 32
- Top goalscorer: League: Lee Miller (13); All: Lee Miller (13)
- Highest home attendance: 20,446 (vs Copenhagen, 20 December)
- Lowest home attendance: 7,270 (vs Inverness CT, 31 October)
- Average home league attendance: 12,888

Aberdeen competed in the Scottish Premier League, Scottish Cup, Scottish League Cup and UEFA Cup in the 2007–08 season. It was the club's first season in European competition since 2002–03.

Qualification for the group stages of the UEFA Cup was secured with an away-goals qualifying victory over Dnipro. Aberdeen were drawn in Group B along with Panathinaikos, Lokomotiv Moscow, Atlético Madrid and Copenhagen. Aberdeen qualified for the round of 32 following a 4–0 victory over F.C. Copenhagen. They were drawn against Bayern Munich and lost 7–3 on aggregate, but did manage a 2–2 home draw with the German club.

== Transfers ==
Summer Transfers
Player in	From	Fee
(Scotland) Lee Mair	Dundee United	Bosman
(England) Jonathan Kurrant	Charlton Athletic	Free
(Scotland) Jackie McNamara	Wolverhampton Wanderers	Free
(Netherlands) Jeffrey de Visscher	De Graafschap	Free
(Scotland) Derek Young	Partick Thistle	Free
(England) Jonathan Smith	Wigan Athletic	Free
(England) Sone Aluko	Birmingham City	Loan
Player out	To	Fee
(Scotland) Jamie Winter	Chesterfield	Free
(Scotland) David Donald	Peterhead	Free
(Republic of Ireland) Gary Dempsey	Yeovil Town	Free
(Netherlands Antilles) Dyron Daal	St Johnstone	Free
(Scotland) Russell Anderson	Sunderland	£1 Million
(Scotland) Craig Brewster	Inverness CT	Free

=== Summer transfers ===
Aberdeen had already announced that the contracts of Jamie Winter and David Donald were not to be renewed. Gary Dempsey rejected a new two-year deal to sign for Yeovil Town, and Dyron Daal left to join St Johnstone.

Aberdeen had secured the signatures of defenders Lee Mair from Dundee United, and youngster Jonathan Kurrant, who would join after he had finished his A-Levels. Both agreed pre-contracts. Wolverhampton Wanderers' experienced defender Jackie McNamara and De Graafschap winger Jeffrey de Visscher both signed on free transfers. Former player Derek Young returned to the club on a free transfer after spells at Dunfermline and Partick Thistle. Sone Aluko was signed on loan from Birmingham City.

On 8 June, it was reported that Aberdeen's first-choice goalkeeper Jamie Langfield had been demoted after falling out with manager Jimmy Calderwood. The fall-out was believed to have been related to Calderwood's decision to reject a £70,000 offer from Rangers. The club later confirmed that they had made Langfield available for transfer, with an asking price of £100,000. Langfield was recalled to the starting line-up for the UEFA Cup game against Dnipro at Pittodrie on 20 September. The day after Aberdeen's UEFA Cup victory over Copenhagen on 20 December, Langfield signed a new three-year contract with Aberdeen.

On 27 June, club captain Russell Anderson moved to Premier League side Sunderland, signing a 3-year contract with the club. He donated his signing-on fee to the youth development scheme at Pittodrie.

=== Winter transfers ===
Winter Transfers
Player in	From	Fee
(Scotland) Stuart Duff	Dundee United	Free
(England) Josh Walker	Middlesbrough	Loan
(Netherlands) Dave Bus	De Graafschap	Free
(Republic of Ireland) Alan Maybury	Leicester City	Free
Player out	To	Fee
(Scotland) Chris Clark	Plymouth Argyle	£200,000
(Scotland) Michael Hart	Preston North End	Undisclosed
(Scotland) Michael Paton	Brechin City	Loan
(Scotland) Stuart Smith	Peterhead	Loan
(Scotland) Neil McVitie	Peterhead	Loan

Chris Clark was the first player to leave Aberdeen in the January window, signing a three-and-a-half-year deal with Plymouth Argyle. The clubs agreed a fee of £200,000 for the midfielder who had played at Aberdeen for seven years. Michael Paton extended his loan deal with Brechin City until the end of the season. Striker Stuart Smith and defender Neil McVitie both went on loan to Peterhead until the end of the season.

Stuart Duff was Aberdeen's first signing of the January transfer window. They signed the midfielder from Dundee United on a free transfer. Sone Aluko agreed to extend his loan from Birmingham City until the end of the season. Defender Dave Bus was signed from De Graafschap until the end of the season. Aberdeen signed Middlesbrough midfielder and England under-18 captain Josh Walker on a loan deal until the end of the season. The Republic of Ireland international Alan Maybury was signed from Leicester City on a loan deal until the end of the season.

After Michael Hart rejected a new deal with Aberdeen, a fee thought to be in the region of £200,000 was agreed between Aberdeen and Preston North End for his transfer. However, Preston reduced their offer after carrying out medical tests on an injury due to keep him out for weeks. Aberdeen refused to release the player unless Preston paid the agreed fee. He eventually moved to Preston for an undisclosed fee thought to be in the region of £100,000.

=== Summer clearout ===
It was announced on 15 April that seven contracted players would be leaving at the end of the season. Barry Nicholson decided to leave, rejecting a new deal. The other six players – goalkeepers Derek Soutar (who had replaced Jamie Langfield for a large part of the season) and Greg Kelly, defenders Richie Byrne and Dave Bus and strikers Jonathan Smith and Steve Lovell – were not offered new deals. Loan signings Sone Aluko and Josh Walker returned to their clubs at the end of their loan periods.

On 21 April, Jackie McNamara was released from his contract by the club.

== Results ==
=== Pre-season friendlies ===
Date	Opponent	H/A	Score	Aberdeen Scorers
12 July	Cove Rangers	A	5–1	Maguire (19), Miller (43, 65), De Visscher (52), Lovell (90)
15 July	Buckie Thistle	A	3–0	Brewster (31, 52), Mackie (88)
18 July	(Egypt) Al Mokawloon	A	0–2	
21 July	(Egypt) Al Aluminium	A	2–0	Brewster (47), Foster (66)
23 July	(Egypt) Al Ittihad	A	2–1	de Visscher (44), Lovell (74)
25 July	Telecom Egypt	A	5–1	Smith (20), Clark (21), Miller (40, 43, 60)
31 July	Inverurie Loco Works	A	6–0	Maguire (14, 31), Kurrant (25), Brewster (52, 66), Paton (73)

=== Scottish Premier League ===
Match Day	Date	Opponent	H/A	Score	Aberdeen Scorer(s)	Attendance	Report
1	4 August	Dundee United	A	0–1		12,496	BBC Sport
2	12 August	Heart of Midlothian	H	1–1	Nicholson (45)	13,134	BBC Sport
3	19 August	Celtic	H	1–3	Brewster (24)	16,232	BBC Sport
4	25 August	Hibernian	A	3–3	Brewster (18, 37), Jamie Smith (57)	15,280	BBC Sport
5	1 September	Kilmarnock	A	1–0	Miller (54)	5,814	BBC Sport
6	15 September	Motherwell	H	1–2	Jamie Smith (65)	10,154	BBC Sport
7	23 September	Rangers	A	0–3		49,046	BBC Sport
8	29 September	Gretna	H	2–0	Diamond (16), Jamie Smith (18)	10,279	BBC Sport
9	7 October	St Mirren	H	4–0	Severin (43, 71) Miller (63, 88)	12,841	BBC Sport
10	21 October	Inverness CT	A	2–1	Young (8), Tokely (62 o.g.)	6,023	BBC Sport
11	28 October	Falkirk	H	1–1	Severin (45)	10,399	BBC Sport
12	3 November	Dundee United	H	2–0	Aluko (45), Miller (90)	11,964	BBC Sport
13	11 November	Heart of Midlothian	A	1–4	de Visscher (38)	17,122	BBC Sport
14	24 November	Celtic	A	0–3		58,000	BBC Sport
15	2 December	Hibernian	H	3–1	Miller (33), Clark (47), Young (86)	10,110	BBC Sport
16	8 December	Kilmarnock	H	2–1	Nicholson (63), Miller (75)	10,207	BBC Sport
17	15 December	Motherwell	A	0–3		5,326	BBC Sport
18	23 December	Rangers	H	1–1	Miller (45)	17,798	BBC Sport
19	26 December	Gretna	A	1–1	Lovell (85)	1,730	BBC Sport
20	29 December	St Mirren	A	1–0	Lovell (85)	5,025	BBC Sport
21	2 January	Inverness CT	H	1–0	Nicholson (83 pen.)	18,372	BBC Sport
22	12 January	Falkirk	A	0–0		5,457	BBC Sport
23	19 January	Dundee United	A	0–3		8,579	BBC Sport
24	26 January	Heart of Midlothian	H	0–1		14,000	BBC Sport
25	10 February	Celtic	H	1–5	Miller (62)	14,651	BBC Sport
26	16 February	Hibernian	A	1–3	Diamond (18)	13,825	BBC Sport
27	24 February	Kilmarnock	A	1–3	Alan Combe (86 o.g.)	6,113	BBC Sport
28	27 February	Motherwell	H	1–1	Diamond (28)	8,240	BBC Sport
29	1 March	Rangers	A	1–3	Lovell (28)	50,066	BBC Sport
30	15 March	Gretna	H	3–0	Maguire (40), Miller (71 pen.), Nicholson (73)	9,025	BBC Sport
31	22 March	St Mirren	H	1–1	Mair (29)	9,779	BBC Sport
32	29 March	Inverness CT	A	4–3	Aluko (7), Nicholson (45), Miller (53), Maguire (90)	5,655	BBC Sport
33	7 April	Falkirk	H	2–1	Maguire (22, 82)	11,484	BBC Sport
34	19 April	Celtic	A	0–1		55,766	BBC Sport
35	26 April	Hibernian	H	2–1	Mackie (64), Miller (70 pen.)	8,387	BBC Sport
36	3 May	Dundee United	H	2–1	Foster (30), Touzani (48)	10,312	BBC Sport
37	10 May	Motherwell	A	1–2	Aluko (67)	8,574	BBC Sport
38	22 May	Rangers	H	2–0	Miller (63), Mackie (77)	17,509	BBC Sport

=== UEFA Cup ===
Round	Date	Opponent	H/A	Score	Aberdeen Scorer(s)	Attendance	Report
FR	20 September	(Ukraine) Dnipro	H	0–0		15,431	BBC Sport
FR	4 October	(Ukraine) Dnipro	A	1–1	Mackie (28)	26,275	BBC Sport
GS	25 October	(Greece) Panathinaikos	A	0–3		8,154	BBC Sport
GS	8 November	(Russia) Lokomotiv Moscow	H	1–1	Diamond (27)	18,843	BBC Sport
GS	29 November	(Spain) Atlético Madrid	A	0–2		30,000	BBC Sport
GS	20 December	(Denmark) Copenhagen	H	4–0	Smith (47, 55), Antonsson (71 o.g.), Foster (83)	20,446	BBC Sport
Ro32	14 February	(Germany) Bayern Munich	H	2–2	Walker (23), Aluko (40)	20,047	BBC Sport
Ro32	21 February	(Germany) Bayern Munich	A	1–5	Lovell (83)	66,000	BBC Sport

=== Scottish League Cup ===
Round	Date	Opponent	H/A	Score	Aberdeen Scorer(s)	Attendance	Report
R3	26 September	Partick Thistle	A	2–0	Young (42), Considine (64)	3,337	BBC Sport
QF	31 October	Inverness CT	H	4–1	Nicholson (10 pen. 21 pen. 78), Miller (45)	7,270	BBC Sport
SF	5 February	Dundee United	N	1–4	Considine (18)	12,046	BBC Sport

=== Scottish Cup ===
Round	Date	Opponent	H/A	Score	Aberdeen Scorer(s)	Attendance	Report
R4	12 January	Falkirk	A	2–2	Smith (4), Lovell (10)	5,798	BBC Sport
R4 (R)	22 January	Falkirk	H	3–1	Smith (19, 55), de Visscher (43)	8,547	BBC Sport
R5	2 February	Hamilton Academical	H	1–0	Diamond (62)	6,441	BBC Sport
QF	9 March	Celtic	H	1–1	de Visscher (78)	10,909	BBC Sport
QF (R)	18 March	Celtic	A	1–0	Mackie (69)	33,506	BBC Sport
SF	12 April	Queen of the South	N	3–4	Considine (36, 59), Nicholson (53)	24,008	BBC Sport

== Players ==
=== First-team squad ===
Squad at end of season

Note: Flags indicate national team as defined under FIFA eligibility rules; some limited exceptions apply. Players may hold more than one non-FIFA nationality.

No.	Pos.	Nation	Player
1	GK	SCO	Jamie Langfield
3	DF	IRL	Richie Byrne
5	DF	SCO	Zander Diamond
6	MF	SCO	Scott Severin (captain)
7	MF	SCO	Jamie Smith
8	MF	SCO	Barry Nicholson
9	FW	ENG	Steve Lovell
10	FW	SCO	Darren Mackie
11	MF	SCO	Stuart Duff
14	MF	SCO	Richard Foster
15	DF	NED	Karim Touzani
16	FW	SCO	Lee Miller
17	DF	ENG	Dan Smith
18	DF	SCO	Lee Mair
19	MF	SCO	Derek Young
20	GK	SCO	Derek Soutar
21	DF	SCO	Andrew Considine

No.	Pos.	Nation	Player
22	FW	SCO	Chris Maguire
23	DF	NED	Dave Bus (on loan from De Graafschap)
24	MF	NED	Jeffrey de Visscher
25	FW	ENG	Jonathan Smith
26	FW	ENG	Sone Aluko (Note: Aluko was born in Hounslow, England, and represented England at U-16, U-17, U-18 and U-19 level, but also qualified to represent Nigeria internationally through his parents and made his international debut for Nigeria in May 2009.) (on loan from Birmingham City)
27	MF	ENG	Josh Walker (on loan from Middlesbrough)
28	DF	IRL	Alan Maybury (on loan from Leicester City)
30	GK	SCO	Greg Kelly
34	MF	SCO	Greig Lamberty
35	DF	SCO	Ryan Strachan
36	DF	SCO	Jonathan Crawford
38	FW	SCO	Gary Carroll
39	MF	SCO	Peter Pawlett (Note: Pawlett was born in Kingston upon Hull, England, but was raised in Scotland from the age of 7 and represented Scotland at U-19 and U-21 level.)
40	GK	ENG	Jonathan Bateman
42	DF	SCO	Scott Ross
44	MF	SCO	Ryan Jack

=== Left club during season ===
Note: Flags indicate national team as defined under FIFA eligibility rules; some limited exceptions apply. Players may hold more than one non-FIFA nationality.

No.	Pos.	Nation	Player
2	DF	SCO	Michael Hart (Preston North End)
4	DF	SCO	Jackie McNamara (released)
11	MF	SCO	Chris Clark (to Plymouth Argyle)
23	FW	SCO	Craig Brewster (to Inverness Caledonian Thistle)

No.	Pos.	Nation	Player
29	DF	SCO	Neil McVitie (on loan to Peterhead)
31	MF	SCO	Michael Paton (on loan to Brechin City)
33	MF	SCO	Stuart Smith (on loan to Peterhead)
37	MF	ENG	Jonathan Kurrant (released)

== Statistics ==
=== Goalscorers ===
Name	SPL	Cups	Total
(Scotland) Lee Miller	12	1	13
(Scotland) Barry Nicholson	5	4	9
(Scotland) Jamie Smith	3	5	8
(Scotland) Zander Diamond	4	1	5
(England) Steve Lovell	3	2	5
(Nigeria) Sone Aluko	3	1	4
(Scotland) Andrew Considine		4	4
(Scotland) Darren Mackie	2	2	4
(Scotland) Chris Maguire	4		4
(Scotland) Craig Brewster	3		3
(Netherlands) Jeffrey de Visscher	1	2	3
(Scotland) Scott Severin	3		3
(Scotland) Derek Young	2	1	3
(Scotland) Richard Foster	1	1	2
(Scotland) Chris Clark	1		1
(Scotland) Lee Mair	1		1
(Netherlands) Karim Touzani	1		1
(England) Josh Walker		1	1
own goals	2	1	3

Source: BBC Sport
Ordered by: Total, SPL, Cups then Name
Name: Players's Name, flag next to name indicates player's nationality. SPL: No. of goals scored in the Scottish Premier League. Cups: No. of goals scored in the Scottish League Cup, Scottish Cup and Uefa Cup. Total: Total No. of competitive goals scored.

=== Discipline ===
Name	Red card	Second yellow card	Yellow card	Total
(Scotland) Lee Miller		1	9	11
(Scotland) Zander Diamond			7	7
(Scotland) Richard Foster			6	6
(Scotland) Derek Young			6	6
(Scotland) Andrew Considine			5	5
(Scotland) Darren Mackie			5	5
(Scotland) Barry Nicholson			5	5
(Scotland) Scott Severin			5	5
(Netherlands) Karim Touzani			4	4
(England) Josh Walker			4	4
(Scotland) Michael Hart			3	3
(Netherlands) Jeffrey de Visscher			3	3
(Republic of Ireland) Alan Maybury			3	3
(Scotland) Chris Clark			2	2
(Scotland) Lee Mair			2	2
(Nigeria) Sone Aluko			1	1
(Republic of Ireland) Richie Byrne			1	1
(Scotland) Jamie Langfield			1	1
(Scotland) Chris Maguire			2	2
(Scotland) Jamie Smith			2	2
(Scotland) Jackie McNamara			1	1

Source: BBC Sport
Ordered by: (red card) , (second yellow card) , (yellow card) then Name
Name: Players's Name, flag next to name indicates player's nationality. (red card) : No. of sending offs by direct red card. (second yellow card) : No. of sending offs by second yellow card. (yellow card) : No. of bookings.

== Competitions ==
=== Overall ===
Competition	Started round	Final position / round	First match	Last match
Scottish Premier League	—	4	4 August 2007	22 May 2008
UEFA Cup	First round	Round of 32	20 September 2007	22 February 2008
Scottish League Cup	Third round	Semi-finals	26 September 2007	5 February 2008
Scottish Cup	Fourth round	Semi-finals	12 January 2008	12 April 2008

Source: Competitions

=== SPL ===
==== Classification ====
Pos	Team	Pld	W	D	L	GF	GA	GD	Pts	Qualification or relegation (Note: Teams played each other three times (33 matches), before the league split into two groups (the top six and the bottom six) for the last five matches.)
2	Rangers	38	27	5	6	84	33	+51	86	Qualification for the Champions League second qualifying round
3	Motherwell	38	18	6	14	50	46	+4	60	Qualification for the UEFA Cup first round
4	Aberdeen	38	15	8	15	50	58	−8	53	
5	Dundee United	38	14	10	14	53	47	+6	52	
6	Hibernian	38	14	10	14	49	45	+4	52	Qualification for the Intertoto Cup second round (Note: Hibernian qualified for the Intertoto Cup as the highest ranked club to apply for a place in the competition.)

Source: Scottish Professional Football League
Rules for classification: 1) Points; 2) Goal difference; 3) Goals scored

==== Results summary ====
Overall								Home						Away					
Pld	W	D	L	GF	GA	GD	Pts	W	D	L	GF	GA	GD	W	D	L	GF	GA	GD
38	15	8	15	50	58	−8	53	11	5	4	33	21	+12	4	3	11	17	37	−20

Source: BBC Sport

==== Results by round ====
Round	1	2	3	4	5	6	7	8	9	10	11	12	13	14	15	16	17	18	19	20	21	22	23	24	25	26	27	28	29	30	31	32	33	34	35	36	37	38
Ground	A	H	H	A	A	H	A	H	H	A	H	H	A	A	H	H	A	H	A	A	H	A	A	H	H	A	A	H	A	H	H	A	H	A	H	H	A	H
Result	L	D	L	D	W	L	L	W	W	W	D	W	L	L	W	W	L	D	D	W	W	D	L	L	L	L	L	D	L	W	D	W	W	L	W	W	L	W

Source: BBC Sport
A = Away; H = Home; W = Win; D = Draw; L = Loss

== Club ==
=== The management ===
Position	Staff
Manager	(Scotland) Jimmy Calderwood
Assistant manager	(Northern Ireland) Jimmy Nicholl
Striker coach	(Scotland) Sandy Clark
Goalkeeping coach	(Scotland) Jim Leighton

=== Other information ===
Chairman	(Scotland) Stewart Milne
Managing Director	(Scotland) Duncan Fraser
Executive Director	(Scotland) Willie Miller
Ground (capacity and dimensions)	Pittodrie Stadium (22,199 / 109x72 yards)

Source: afc.co.uk

=== Team kit ===
Supplier: Nike
Sponsor(s): Apex Tubulars/Acergy

Home	Away	Third

Source: afc.co.uk

== See also ==
- List of Aberdeen F.C. seasons

== Squad ==
=== Appearances & Goals ===
No.	Pos	Nat	Player	Total		SPL		Scottish Cup		League Cup		Europa League	
No.	Pos	Nat	Player	Apps	Goals	Apps	Goals	Apps	Goals	Apps	Goals	Apps	Goals
1	GK	(Scotland) SCO	Jamie Langfield	39	0	25	0	3	0	3	0	8	0
3	DF	(Republic of Ireland) IRL	Richie Byrne	17	0	13	0	1	0	1	0	2	0
5	DF	(Scotland) SCO	Zander Diamond	42	5	26	3	6	1	2	0	8	1
6	MF	(Scotland) SCO	Scott Severin (c)	51	3	35	3	6	0	2	0	8	0
7	MF	(Scotland) SCO	Jamie Smith	26	8	17	3	3	3	2	0	4	2
8	MF	(Scotland) SCO	Barry Nicholson	53	9	38	5	5	1	3	3	7	0
9	FW	(England) ENG	Steve Lovell	30	5	22	3	3	1	0	0	5	1
10	FW	(Scotland) SCO	Darren Mackie	26	4	19	2	3	1	1	0	3	1
11	MF	(Scotland) SCO	Stuart Duff	11	0	10	0	1	0	0	0	0	0
14	DF	(Scotland) SCO	Richard Foster	48	2	33	1	5	0	3	0	7	1
15	DF	(Netherlands) NED	Karim Touzani	18	1	14	1	2	0	0	0	2	0
16	FW	(Scotland) SCO	Lee Miller	52	13	36	12	6	0	3	1	7	0
17	DF	(England) ENG	Dan Smith	4	0	3	0	1	0	0	0	0	0
18	DF	(Scotland) SCO	Lee Mair	26	1	18	1	2	0	2	0	4	0
19	MF	(Scotland) SCO	Derek Young	36	3	24	2	4	0	3	1	5	0
20	GK	(Scotland) SCO	Derek Soutar	16	0	13	0	3	0	0	0	0	0
21	DF	(Scotland) SCO	Andrew Considine	37	4	22	0	5	2	3	2	7	0
22	FW	(Scotland) SCO	Chris Maguire	35	4	28	4	3	0	0	0	4	0
23	DF	(Netherlands) NED	David Bus	7	0	6	0	0	0	1	0	0	0
24	MF	(Netherlands) NED	Jeffrey de Visscher	30	3	22	1	3	2	1	0	4	0
25	FW	(England) ENG	Jonathan Smith	2	0	1	0	1	0	0	0	0	0
26	FW	(Nigeria) NGA	Sone Aluko	31	4	20	3	4	0	2	0	5	1
27	MF	(England) ENG	Josh Walker	13	1	8	0	2	0	1	0	2	1
28	DF	(Republic of Ireland) IRL	Alan Maybury	19	0	13	0	4	0	0	0	2	0
30	GK	(Scotland) SCO	Greg Kelly	0	0	0	0	0	0	0	0	0	0
Players who left the club during the season
2	DF	(Scotland) SCO	Michael Hart	26	0	18	0	0	0	2	0	6	0
4	DF	(Scotland) SCO	Jackie McNamara	25	0	17	0	3	0	2	0	3	0
11	MF	(Scotland) SCO	Chris Clark	27	1	18	1	1	0	2	0	6	0
23	FW	(Scotland) SCO	Craig Brewster	3	3	3	3	0	0	0	0	0	0
