= Jonathan Smith =

Jonathan, Jonny, or Jon Smith may refer to:

== Arts and entertainment ==
- Jonathan Smith (novelist) (born 1942), English novelist and playwright
- Jon Robert Smith (born 1945), American tenor saxophonist
- Lil Jon (Jonathan H. Smith, born 1971), American rap music producer
- Jonny Smith (journalist) (born 1979), English television presenter
- Jonathan Smith, American drummer in the band Days Difference
- Jonathan Smith, a.k.a. Jono MOFO, bassist for the band A Place to Bury Strangers

== Sports ==
=== American football ===
- Jonathan Smith (American football coach) (born 1979), American college football coach and player
- Jonathan Smith (wide receiver) (born 1981), American NFL football wide receiver
- Jonathan Smith (running back) (born 1981), American football running back

=== Association football (soccer) ===
- Jonathan Smith (footballer, born 1891), English player with QPR, Swansea Town; on List of Manchester City F.C. players
- Jonathan Smith (footballer, born 1986), English footballer
- Jonathan Smith (footballer, born 1988), English footballer
- Jonny Smith (footballer) (born 1997), English footballer

=== Other sports ===
- Jonathan Smith (tennis) (born 1955), British tennis player
- Jonathan Smith (rower) (born 1961), American rower
- Jonathan Smith (rugby league) (born 1979), New Zealand rugby league footballer
- Jonathan Smith (racing driver) (born 1986), American race car driver

== Others ==
- Jonathan Bayard Smith (1742–1812), American merchant, delegate to the Continental Congress
- Jonathan J. Smith (1844–1916), American politician
- Jonathan Z. Smith (1938–2017), American historian of religions
- Jon Michael Smith (born 1938), American scientist and engineer
- Jonathan Smith (priest) (born 1955), Church of England priest and Archdeacon of St Albans
- Jonathan Smith (games programmer) (1967–2010), British games programmer
- Jonathan Smith (psychologist), British psychology professor
- Jonathan Smith (firefighter), Commissioner of the London Fire Brigade

== See also ==
- Johnny Smith (disambiguation)
- Jonty Smith (born 1992), South African rower
- John Smith (disambiguation)
