= 2006–07 Aberdeen F.C. season =

Aberdeen
2006–07 season
- Chairman: Stewart Milne
- Manager: Jimmy Calderwood
- Stadium: Pittodrie Stadium
- SPL: 3rd
- Scottish Cup: Third round
- League Cup: Second round
- Top goalscorer: League: Darren Mackie (13); All: Darren Mackie (13)
- Highest home attendance: 20,045 vs Rangers 23 December 2006
- Lowest home attendance: 7,905 vs Hibernian 10 January 2007
- Average home league attendance: 12,475

Aberdeen competed in the Scottish Premier League, Scottish Cup and Scottish League Cup in season 2006–07. Their third place in the Scottish Premier League was their highest since the 1995–96 season.

== Statistics ==
=== Appearances and goals ===
No.	Pos	Nat	Player	Total		SPL		Scottish Cup		League Cup	
No.	Pos	Nat	Player	Apps	Goals	Apps	Goals	Apps	Goals	Apps	Goals
1	GK	(Scotland) SCO	Jamie Langfield	40	0	38	0	2	0	0	0
2	DF	(Scotland) SCO	Michael Hart	36	0	34	0	2	0	0	0
3	MF	(Republic of Ireland) IRL	Richie Byrne	5	0	5	0	0	0	0	0
4	DF	(Scotland) SCO	Russell Anderson	38	2	35	2	2	0	1	0
5	DF	(Scotland) SCO	Zander Diamond	21	0	21	0	0	0	0	0
6	MF	(Scotland) SCO	Scott Severin	38	4	35	4	2	0	1	0
7	MF	(Scotland) SCO	Jamie Smith	21	1	21	1	0	0	0	0
8	MF	(Scotland) SCO	Barry Nicholson	34	8	31	6	2	2	1	0
9	FW	(England) ENG	Steve Lovell	29	9	27	9	2	0	0	0
10	FW	(Scotland) SCO	Darren Mackie	41	13	38	13	2	0	1	0
11	MF	(Scotland) SCO	Chris Clark	40	1	37	1	2	0	1	0
14	MF	(Republic of Ireland) IRL	Gary Dempsey	29	2	26	2	2	0	1	0
15	DF	(Netherlands) NED	Karim Touzani	10	0	10	0	0	0	0	0
16	FW	(Scotland) SCO	Lee Miller	34	4	32	4	2	0	0	0
16	FW	(Scotland) SCO	John Stewart	5	0	4	0	0	0	1	0
17	DF	(England) ENG	Dan Smith	8	0	6	0	1	0	1	0
18	MF	(Scotland) SCO	Jamie Winter	1	0	0	0	0	0	1	0
19	MF	(Scotland) SCO	Richard Foster	40	3	37	3	2	0	1	0
20	GK	(Scotland) SCO	Derek Soutar	1	0	0	0	0	0	1	0
21	DF	(Scotland) SCO	Andrew Considine	36	2	33	2	2	0	1	0
22	MF	(Scotland) SCO	Kyle Macaulay	1	0	0	0	0	0	1	0
23	FW	(Scotland) SCO	Steve Crawford	5	3	4	3	0	0	1	0
23	FW	(Scotland) SCO	Craig Brewster	13	1	12	0	1	1	0	0
24	DF	(Scotland) SCO	David Donald	0	0	0	0	0	0	0	0
25	FW	(Scotland) SCO	Chris Maguire	22	1	19	1	2	0	1	0
26	FW	(Netherlands) NED	Dyron Daal	7	2	7	2	0	0	0	0

Source: AFC Heritage

== Results ==
=== Friendlies ===
Date	Opponent	H/A	Score	Aberdeen Scorers
6 July	Peterhead	A	4–1	Crawford (24), Dempsey (28), Mackie (71,80)
9 July	Elgin City	A	5–0	Byrne (20, 63), Clark (36), Maguire (74), Mackie (84)
14 July	(South Africa) Bloemfontein Celtic	A	2–1	Stewart (2, 75)
16 July	(South Africa) Jomo Cosmos	A	0–2	
19 July	(South Africa) Jomo Cosmos	A	1–0	Lovell (52)
22 July	(South Africa) Benoni Premier United	A	3–2	Lovell (26), Mackie (31), Crawford (86)
26 July	Montrose	A	3–0	Considine (10), Lovell (26), Kiely (41)
1 August	Forres Mechanics	A	3–1	Stewart (36, 53), Donald (68)
8 August	(England) Everton	H	2–3	Dempsey (40), Smith (70)
23 February	(Republic of Ireland) Bohemians	A	0–0	

=== Scottish Premier League ===
Match Day	Date	Opponent	Venue	Score	Aberdeen Scorer(s)	Attendance	Report
1	29 July	Hibernian	A	1–1	Crawford (18)	15,046	AFC Heritage
2	5 August	Inverness Caledonian Thistle	H	1–1	Crawford (29)	11,955	AFC Heritage
3	12 August	Motherwell	A	2–0	Mackie (25,60)	5,186	AFC Heritage
4	19 August	St Mirren	A	1–1	Crawford (29)	5,344	AFC Heritage
5	26 August	Dunfermline	H	1–0	Severin (68)	9,889	AFC Heritage
6	9 September	Celtic	H	0–1		15,304	AFC Heritage
7	16 September	Falkirk	A	2–0	Dempsey (51), Daal (82)	5,812	AFC Heritage
8	24 September	Heart of Midlothian	H	1–3	Daal (82)	11,160	AFC Heritage
9	1 October	Rangers	A	0–1		50,488	AFC Heritage
10	14 October	Kilmarnock	A	0–1		5,700	AFC Heritage
11	21 October	Dundee United	H	3–1	Mackie (38), Nicholson (46, 71)	10,747	AFC Heritage
12	30 October	Hibernian	H	2–1	Miller (56), Severin (90+3)	11,179	AFC Heritage
13	6 November	Inverness Caledonian Thistle	A	1–1	Lovell (89)	5,744	AFC Heritage
14	11 November	Motherwell	H	2–1	Smith (55), Miller (86)	10,527	AFC Heritage
15	18 November	St Mirren	H	2–0	Mackie (77, 85)	11,426	AFC Heritage
16	25 November	Dunfermline Athletic	A	3–0	Miller (54), Mackie (83, 86)	6,501	AFC Heritage
17	2 December	Celtic	A	0–1		58,911	AFC Heritage
18	9 December	Falkirk	H	2–1	Mackie (17), Clark (44)	10,594	AFC Heritage
19	16 December	Heart of Midlothian	A	1–0	Lovell (87)	17,274	AFC Heritage
20	23 December	Rangers	H	1–2	Lovell (85)	20,045	AFC Heritage
21	26 December	Kilmarnock	H	3–1	Maguire (5), Nicholson (8), Lovell (87)	11,887	AFC Heritage
22	30 December	Dundee United	A	1–3	Severin (56)	12,329	AFC Heritage
23	2 January	Hibernian	A	0–0		16,278	AFC Heritage
24	13 January	Inverness Caledonian Thistle	H	1–1	Lovell (90+3)	10,300	AFC Heritage
25	27 January	St Mirren	A	2–0	Considine (8, 37)	4,926	AFC Heritage
26	10 February	Dunfermline	H	3–0	Mackie (33), Nicholson (57 pen), Lovell (83)	9,379	AFC Heritage
27	17 February	Celtic	H	1–2	Mackie (90)	16,711	AFC Heritage
28	3 March	Falkirk	A	2–1	Dempsey (16), Foster (61)	5,825	AFC Heritage
29	10 March	Heart of Midlothian	H	1–0	Lovell (7)	13,964	AFC Heritage
30	13 March	Motherwell	A	2–0	Fitzpatrick (32 o.g.), Foster (90)	4,530	AFC Heritage
31	17 March	Rangers	A	0–3		50,354	AFC Heritage
32	31 March	Kilmarnock	A	2–1	Fowler (59 o.g.), Anderson (69)	7,236	AFC Heritage
33	7 April	Dundee United	H	2–4	Lovell (8), Mackie (10 pen)	12,148	AFC Heritage
34	21 April	Hibernian	H	2–2	Anderson (25), Foster (80)	9,753	AFC Heritage
35	28 April	Kilmarnock	H	3–0	Nicholson (7 pen), Miller (49), Mackie (62)	10,046	AFC Heritage
36	6 May	Heart of Midlothian	A	1–1	Nicholson (90)	17,208	AFC Heritage
37	12 May	Celtic	A	1–2	Mackie (41)	59,510	AFC Heritage
38	20 May	Rangers	H	2–0	Severin (21), Lovell (32)	20,010	AFC Heritage

=== Scottish League Cup ===
Round	Date	Opponent	H/A	Score	Aberdeen Scorer(s)	Attendance	Report
R3	22 August	Queen's Park	A	0–0 (3–5 on penalty kicks)		1,588	AFC Heritage

=== Scottish Cup ===
Round	Date	Opponent	H/A	Score	Aberdeen Scorer(s)	Attendance	Report
R3	10 January	Hibernian	H	2–2	Brewster (58), Nicholson (88)	7,905	AFC Heritage
R3 (R)	18 January	Hibernian	A	1–4	Nicholson (10)	11,375	AFC Heritage

== Players ==
=== Squad ===
Note: Flags indicate national team as defined under FIFA eligibility rules; some limited exceptions apply. Players may hold more than one non-FIFA nationality.

No.	Pos.	Nation	Player
1	GK	SCO	Jamie Langfield
2	DF	SCO	Michael Hart
3	DF	IRL	Richie Byrne
4	DF	SCO	Russell Anderson (captain)
5	DF	SCO	Zander Diamond
6	MF	SCO	Scott Severin
7	MF	SCO	Jamie Smith
8	MF	SCO	Barry Nicholson
9	FW	ENG	Steve Lovell
10	FW	SCO	Darren Mackie
11	MF	SCO	Chris Clark
14	MF	SCO	Gary Dempsey
15	DF	NED	Karim Touzani

No.	Pos.	Nation	Player
16	FW	SCO	Lee Miller
16	FW	SCO	John Stewart
17	DF	ENG	Dan Smith
18	MF	SCO	Jamie Winter
19	DF	SCO	Ricky Foster
20	GK	SCO	Derek Soutar
21	DF	SCO	Andrew Considine
22	MF	SCO	Kyle Macaulay
23	FW	SCO	Stevie Crawford
23	FW	SCO	Craig Brewster
24	DF	SCO	David Donald
25	FW	SCO	Chris Maguire
26	FW	NED	Dyron Daal

=== Goalscorers ===
Name	SPL	Cups	Total
(Scotland) Darren Mackie	13	0	13
(England) Steve Lovell	9	0	9
(Scotland) Barry Nicholson	6	2	8
(Scotland) Scott Severin	4	0	4
(Scotland) Lee Miller	4	0	4
(Scotland) Richard Foster	3	0	3
(Scotland) Stevie Crawford	3	0	3
(Scotland) Andrew Considine	2	0	2
(Scotland) Russell Anderson	2	0	2
(Netherlands) Dyron Daal	2	0	2
(Republic of Ireland) Gary Dempsey	2	0	2
(Scotland) Jamie Smith	1	0	1
(Scotland) Chris Clark	1	0	1
(Scotland) Chris Maguire	1	0	1
(Scotland) Craig Brewster	0	1	1
own goals	2	0	2

Source: BBC Sport
Ordered by: Total, SPL, Cups then Name
Name: Players's Name, flag next to name indicates player's nationality. SPL: No. of goals scored in the Scottish Premier League. Cups: No. of goals scored in the Scottish League Cup, Scottish Cup and Uefa Cup. Total: Total No. of competitive goals scored.

== Competitions ==
=== Overall ===
Competition	Started round	Final position / round	First match	Last match
Scottish Premier League	—	3	29 July 2006	20 May 2007
League Cup	Second round	Second round	22 August 2006	22 August 2006
Scottish Cup	Third round	Third round	10 January 2007	18 January 2007

Source: Competitions

=== SPL ===
==== Classification ====
Pos	Team	Pld	W	D	L	GF	GA	GD	Pts	Qualification or relegation (Note: Teams played each other three times (33 matches), before the league split into two groups (the top six and the bottom six) for the last five matches.)
1	Celtic (C)	38	26	6	6	65	34	+31	84	Qualification for the Champions League third qualifying round
2	Rangers	38	21	9	8	61	32	+29	72	Qualification for the Champions League second qualifying round
3	Aberdeen	38	19	8	11	55	38	+17	65	Qualification for the UEFA Cup first round
4	Heart of Midlothian	38	17	10	11	47	35	+12	61	
5	Kilmarnock	38	16	7	15	47	54	−7	55	

Source: Scottish Professional Football League
Rules for classification: 1) Points; 2) Goal difference; 3) Goals scored
(C) Champions

==== Results summary ====
Overall								Home						Away					
Pld	W	D	L	GF	GA	GD	Pts	W	D	L	GF	GA	GD	W	D	L	GF	GA	GD
38	19	8	11	55	38	+17	65	11	3	5	33	21	+12	8	5	6	22	17	+5

Source: BBC Sport

==== Results by round ====
Round	1	2	3	4	5	6	7	8	9	10	11	12	13	14	15	16	17	18	19	20	21	22	23	24	25	26	27	28	29	30	31	32	33	34	35	36	37	38
Ground	A	H	A	A	H	H	A	H	A	A	H	H	A	H	H	A	A	H	A	H	H	A	A	H	A	H	H	A	H	A	A	A	H	H	H	A	A	H
Result	D	D	W	D	W	L	W	L	L	L	W	W	D	W	W	W	L	W	W	L	W	L	D	D	W	W	L	W	W	W	L	W	L	D	W	D	L	W

Source: BBC Sport
A = Away; H = Home; W = Win; D = Draw; L = Loss

==== Results by opponent ====
Team	Results				Points
Team	1	2	3	4	Points
Celtic	0–1	0–1	1–2	1–2	0
Dundee United	3–1	1–3	2–4		3
Dunfermline Athletic	1–0	3–0	3–0		9
Falkirk	2–0	2–1	2–0		9
Heart of Midlothian	1–3	1–0	1–0	1–1	7
Hibernian	1–1	2–1	0–0	2–2	6
Inverness CT	1–1	1–1	1–1		3
Kilmarnock	0–1	3–1	2–1	3–0	9
Motherwell	2–0	2–1	2–0		9
Rangers	0–1	1–2	0–3	2–0	3
St Mirren	1–1	2–0	2–0		7

Source: 2006–07 Scottish Premier League article

== Club ==
=== The management ===
Position	Staff
Manager	(Scotland) Jimmy Calderwood
Assistant manager	(Northern Ireland) Jimmy Nicholl
Striker coach	(Scotland) Sandy Clark
Goalkeeping coach	(Scotland) Jim Leighton

=== Other information ===
Chairman	(Scotland) Stewart Milne
Executive Director	(Scotland) Willie Miller
Ground (capacity and dimensions)	Pittodrie Stadium (22,199 / 109x72 yards)

Source: afc.co.uk

== See also ==
- List of Aberdeen F.C. seasons
