= Dave Bus =

Dutch professional footballer

Personal information
- Full name: David Bus
- Date of birth: May 19, 1978 (age 48)
- Place of birth: Lichtenvoorde, Netherlands
- Height: 1.83 m (6 ft 0 in)
- Position: Centre-back

Youth career
- Longa '30
- HSC '21

Senior career*
Years	Team	Apps	(Gls)
2004–2008	De Graafschap	79	(2)
2008	→ Aberdeen (loan)	7	(0)
2008–2012	Go Ahead Eagles	112	(4)
Total		198	(6)
- * Club domestic league appearances and goals

David Bus (born May 19, 1978) is a Dutch former professional footballer who played as a defender.

== Career ==
=== De Graafschap ===
Bus came into professional football relatively late, starting his career at De Graafschap in 2004 at the age of 26 after a few stints at amateur clubs in his hometown, Lichtenvoorde. He became a fan favourite during his first season at De Graafschap. He played 29 games during the 2004/05 season, helping his side get promoted to the Eredivisie. The next season, he played more games and performed better but his efforts were not enough to stop De Graafschap being relegated back to the Eerste Divisie. He only played 15 games in the Eerste Divisie during the 2006/07 season after the arrival of Cerezo Fung a Wing. De Graafschap were once again promoted to the Eredivisie in the 2007/08 season and opted to play a 3-man defence and with captain René Bot, Cerezo Fung a Wing and Stephan Keller the usual starters, Bus was left out in the cold.

=== Aberdeen ===
In January 2008 Aberdeen signed Bus on a six-month loan deal with first option to buy if he impressed. He joined fellow Dutchmen Jeffrey de Visscher and Karim Touzani at Pittodrie. At Aberdeen, Bus made limited appearances and even scored an own goal against Inverness CT. On 15 April 2008, he was told he would not be offered a deal to stay at Aberdeen and would be free to return to the Netherlands.

=== Go Ahead Eagles ===
In summer 2008, he signed a contract with Go Ahead Eagles of the Eerste Divisie.

He finished his career in 2014 and returned to the amateur ranks to play for childhood and hometown club Longa'30. He runs an online wholesaler in sports supplies.
