= Howard White =

Howard White may refer to:

- Howard White (American football) (born 1922), American football coach and scout
- Howard White (writer) (born 1945), Canadian writer
- Howard D. White (born 1936), American librarian
- Howard White (footballer) (born 1954), footballer for Manchester City
- Howard A. White (1913–1991), American historian and academic administrator
