= James Whittaker =

James Whittaker or Jim Whittaker may refer to:

- James Whittaker (Shaker) (1751–1787) second leader of the Shakers
- James Whittaker, founder of Whittaker's, confectionery manufacturer in 1896
- James Whittaker (footballer) (1882–1949), English footballer
- Jim Whittaker (1929–2026), American climber and mountain guide
- Jim Bowen (real name James Whittaker, 1937–2018), English stand-up comedian
- James William Whittaker (1828–1876), English painter
- James Whittaker (runner) (born 1917), 5000 m runner-up at the 1939 USA Outdoor Track and Field Championships
- James Whittaker, a character in the 1930 American film Such Is the Law
- James Whittaker, a character in the 1945 American film Captain Eddie

== See also ==
- James Whitaker (disambiguation)
