= Kenneth Taylor =

Kenneth, Kenny or Ken Taylor may refer to:

== Sports ==
=== Association football (soccer) ===
- Ken Taylor (footballer, born 1931) (1931–2016), English footballer for Blackburn Rovers
- Ken Taylor (footballer, born 1936) (1936–2017), English footballer for Manchester City
- Kenneth Taylor (footballer, born 2002), Dutch footballer

=== Cricket ===
- Ken Taylor (cricketer, born 1916) (1916–2002), English cricketer
- Ken Taylor (cricketer, born 1935) (1935–2026), English cricketer and footballer for Huddersfield Town
- Ken Taylor (New Zealand cricketer) (born 1953), New Zealand cricketer

=== Other sports ===
- Ken Taylor (rugby union) (born 1957), New Zealand rugby union player
- Ken Taylor (American football) (born 1963), American football defensive back
- Kenny Taylor (basketball) (born 1982), American basketball player

== Other people ==
- Kenneth N. Taylor (1917–2005), American publishing entrepreneur
- Kenneth M. Taylor (1919–2006), American WWII pilot at Pearl Harbor
- Ken Taylor (scriptwriter) (1922–2011), English television script writer
- Kenneth D. Taylor (1934–2015), Canadian ambassador to Iran during the Iran Hostage Crisis
- Kenneth Alan Taylor (born 1937), British theatre director and pantomime dame
- Kenneth L. Taylor (born 1941), American historian of geology
- Ken Taylor (philosopher) (1954–2019), American professor of philosophy at Stanford University
- Ken Taylor (politician) (fl. 1995–1997), Canadian politician and leader of the Yukon Liberal Party

== Other uses ==
- Ken Taylor, a rosemary cultivar
