= John Greenwood =

John Greenwood may refer to:

== Sportspeople ==
- John Greenwood (cricketer, born 1851) (1851–1935), English cricketer
- John Eric Greenwood (1891–1975), rugby union international who represented England
- John Greenwood (footballer) (1921–1994), English footballer
- Jack Greenwood (footballer) (born 1943), Australian footballer of the 1960s
- John Greenwood (racing driver) (1945–2015), American driver and co-founder of Greenwood Corvettes

== Others ==
- John Greenwood (divine) (1556–1593), Puritan divine
- John Greenwood (educator) (died 1609), English schoolmaster
- John Greenwood (artist) (1727–1792), colonial American artist
- John Greenwood (dentist) (1760–1819), George Washington's dentist and the "father of modern dentistry"
- John Greenwood (bus operator) (1788–1851), transport entrepreneur from Salford
- John Greenwood (lawyer) (1800–1871), English lawyer and cricketer
- John Greenwood (cartographer) (fl. 1821–1840), and his brother Christopher, cartographer and publisher
- John Danforth Greenwood (1803-1890), physician and educationist, Sussex and New Zealand
- John Greenwood (MP) (1821–1874), British Member of the UK Parliament for Ripon
- John Greenwood (composer) (1889–1975), English composer of classical and film music
- John Greenwood (executive) (1950–2008), British catering executive
- John Greenwood (Australian politician) (born 1934), member of the Queensland Legislative Assembly
- John Greenwood (surgeon) (born 1962 or 1963), Australian surgeon

== See also ==
- Jonny Greenwood (born 1971), English musician and composer
- Johnny Greenwood (singer) (born 1939), Australian country music singer
- John Buxton Hilton (1921–1986), British crime writer, who also wrote as 'John Greenwood'
