= Trevor Ogden =

Trevor Ogden may refer to:

- Trevor Ogden (footballer) (born 1945), English footballer for Manchester City
- Trevor Ogden (Coronation Street), a character on the British soap opera Coronation Street
