= James Whitaker =

James Whitaker may refer to:

- James Whitaker (journalist), (1940–2012), British journalist
- James Whitaker (cricketer) (born 1962), English cricketer
- Jim Whitaker (born 1950), U.S. Republican Party politician
- James William Whittaker (or Whitaker), English painter

== See also ==
- James Whitaker Wright (1846-1904), English mining company owner
- James Whittaker (disambiguation)
