= JDV =

JDV may refer to:

- Jason de Vos (born 1974), Canadian soccer player
- Jeffrey de Visscher (born 1981), Dutch footballer
- Jose de Venecia, Jr. (1936–2026), Filipino politician
- Jean de Villiers (born 1981), South African rugby player
- JD Vance (born 1984), 50th Vice President of the United States and former US Senator from Ohio
- Jnana Deepa, Institute of Philosophy and Theology, Pune, India (Pontifical Athenaeum)
- Joe Devance (born 1982), Filipino basketball player
- DjVu, document file format
