= Jon Michael Smith =

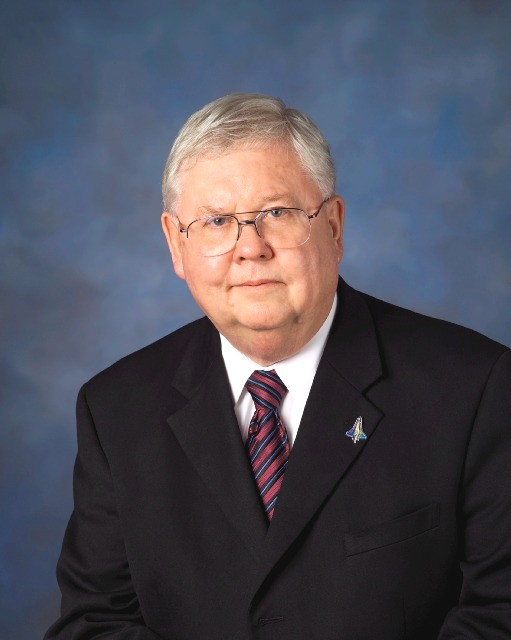
Jon Michael Smith

Jon Michael Smith (born September 6, 1938) is an American scientist/engineer, retired NASA officer, and author, who developed the numerical integration technique known as T-integration.

== Biography ==
Born in 1938, Smith holds a Bachelor of Science degree in Physics from the Jesuit Seattle University. He attended the Harvard Business School's six-week Advanced Management Program, and a past member of the MIT Sloan School of Management Complex Organizations Program.

Smith worked for NASA on their Space Shuttle program. He was the first marketing manager for the Space Shuttle. His contributions included the preparation of the pricing and use policy for the Shuttle and the first launch agreements with commercial users. Later he managed the Advanced Communication Technology Satellite experiments program and the commercialization of the NASA polar communications network. Mike retired from the NASA Johnson Space Center in Houston, Texas in January 2007.

When at NASA, Smith managed the special projects office in the Space Shuttle Program Strategic Planning office. His work dealt with NASA's response to the recommendations made by the Columbia Accident Investigation Board and with NASA's terminating the Space Shuttle Program. Prior to this assignment, he served as the Commercialization Manager for the Space Operations Management Office at JSC and served as the program manager for the Advanced Communications Technology Satellite Program.

Currently Smith is the proprietor of Jon M. Smith and Associates (JMSA), a Galveston Texas-based consulting firm whose expertise includes space commercialization initiatives & launch vehicle flight guidance and control systems. Also, JMSA is involved with commercialized telescopes and space based energy initiatives. His clients include NASA and Wyle Labs.

== Selected publications ==
- Mathematical Modeling and Digital Simulation for Engineers and Scientists,
- Scientific Analysis on the Pocket Calculator,
- Financial Analysis & Business Decisions on the Pocket Calculator
- Quantitative Methods in Business, McGraw Hill.
