= Howard White (American football) =

American football coach

Biographical details
- Born: February 21, 1922

Playing career

Football
- 1940–1941: Riverside
- 1942: San Diego State
- 1946: USC

Basketball
- 1940–1942: Riverside
- Positions: End (football); Guard (basketball)

Coaching career (HC unless noted)

Football
- 1948: Hoover HS (CA) (assistant)
- 1949–1951: La Jolla HS (CA) (assistant)
- 1952: Escondido HS (CA)
- 1953–1956: Riverside Polytechnic HS (CA)
- 1957–1959: Riverside
- 1960–1961: New Mexico State (backfield)
- 1962–1963: West Texas State (backfield)
- 1964–1966: California (assistant)
- 1967–1969: Eastern New Mexico

Baseball
- 1950–1952: La Jolla HS (CA)

Track
- 1960–1962: New Mexico State

Administrative career (AD unless noted)
- 1972–1976: BLESTO (scout)
- 1976–1979: San Francisco 49ers (scout)
- 1982–1983: Arizona Wranglers (DPP)
- 1983–1984: New Orleans Breakers (DPP)

Head coaching record
- Overall: 8–20–1 (college football); 20–6–2 (junior college football); 38–10–1 (high school football)
- Bowls: 0–1 (junior college)

Accomplishments and honors

Championships
- Football; 2 Eastern Conference (1958–1959)

Robert Howard White (born February 21, 1922) is an American former football coach, scout, and executive. He served as the head football coach at Eastern New Mexico University (ENMU) in Portales, New Mexico from 1967 to 1969, compiling a record of 8–20–1. He was also the head football coach at Riverside City College in Riverside, California from 1957 to 1959, tallying a mark of 20–6–2. White later worked as a scout for the San Francisco 49ers of the National Football League (NFL) and as a personnel executive for the Arizona Wranglers and the New Orleans Breakers of the United States Football League (USFL).

A native of Escondido, California, he played college football in the 1940s at Riverside Junior College, San Diego State University, and the University of Southern California (USC). White began his coaching career in the Southern California high school ranks in the late 1940s and 1950s. In between his head coaching tenures at Riverside and Eastern New Mexico, he was an assistant football coach at New Mexico State University, West Texas State University, and the University of California, Berkeley.

== Early life, playing career, education, and military service ==
White was born on February 21, 1922. He attended Escondido High School in Escondido, California, where lettered in football, basketball, and track. In football, he played as an end and was voted most valuable player. White was captain of the basketball team for two season and earned three letters in track, competing in the half-mile and high hurdles.

After graduating from Escondido High School in 1940, White went to Riverside Junior College—now known as Riverside City College—in Riverside, California, where played football as an end and basketball as a guard. In 1942, he transferred to San Diego State University and played for the 1942 San Diego State Aztecs football team. In the season finale, a 28–13 loss to Whittier, White caught a pass from Art Blaisdell for an extra point.

White's college career was interrupted by military service during World War II. He served in Europe as a lieutenant in the United States Army with the 12th Armored Division. After the war, White matriculated at the University of Southern California (USC), playing football in 1946 and earning a Bachelor of Arts in 1948. He added a Master of Education from USC in 1955.

== Coaching career ==
White began his coaching career in 1948 as an assistant football coach at Hoover High School in San Diego. In 1949, he moved to La Jolla High School, serving as an assistant football coach and head baseball coach for three years. White returned to his alma mater, Escondido High School, as head football coach in 1952. He led the Escondido Cougars to a record of 6–3 in the fall of 1952.

White was the head football coach at Riverside Polytechnic High School in Riverside, California from 1953 to 1956, tallying a mark of 32–7–1 in four seasons. In 1957, he was hired as the head football coach at Riverside City College, succeeding Nate DeFrancisco. White led the Riverside Tigers to two Eastern Conference titles and a record of 20–6–2 in three seasons before resigning in 1960.

In 1960, White was hired as head track coach and assistant football coach under Warren B. Woodson at New Mexico State University. He was an assistant football coach at West Texas State University—now known as West Texas A&M University—under Joe Kerbel from 1962 to 1963 and at the University of California, Berkeley from 1964 to 1966 under Ray Willsey. In 1967, White was hired as head football coach and assistant professor of health, physical education, and recreation at Eastern New Mexico. He resigned as football coach following the 1969 season. He posted a record of 8–20–1 in three seasons and was succeeded by Jack Scott.

== Scouting and personnel career ==
From 1972 to 1976, White worked as an administrator for BLESTO, a scouting organization for the National Football League (NFL). In 1976, he was hired by the San Francisco 49ers of the NFL as director of college personnel. He resigned from his post with the 49ers three years later. In the 1980s, White was the director of the player personnel for the Arizona Wranglers and the New Orleans Breakers of the United States Football League (USFL).

== Head coaching record ==
=== College football ===
| Year | Team | Overall | Conference | Standing | Bowl/playoffs |
|---|---|---|---|---|---|
Eastern New Mexico Greyhounds (NAIA independent) (1967–1969)
| 1967 | Eastern New Mexico | 3–6 | | | |
| 1968 | Eastern New Mexico | 4–5–1 | | | |
| 1969 | Eastern New Mexico | 1–9 | | | |
| Eastern New Mexico: | | 8–20–1 | | | |
| Total: | | 8–20–1 | | | |

=== Junior college football ===
| Year | Team | Overall | Conference | Standing | Bowl/playoffs |
|---|---|---|---|---|---|
Riverside Tigers (Eastern Conference) (1957–1959)
| 1957 | Riverside | 4–4–1 | 4–3–1 | 3rd | |
| 1958 | Riverside | 9–1 | 7–0 | 1st | L Potato Bowl |
| 1959 | Riverside | 7–1–1 | 5–1–1 | T–1st | |
| Riverside: | | 20–6–2 | 13–4–1 | | |
| Total: | | 20–6–2 | | | |
National championship Conference title Conference division title or championship game berth
