= John Greenwood (educator) =

English schoolmaster

John Greenwood (died 1609) was an English schoolmaster.

Greenwood was matriculated as a pensioner of St. John's College, Cambridge, in 1558; removed to Catharine Hall, of which he was afterwards fellow; proceeded B.A. in 1561–62, and commenced M.A. in 1565. He became master of the grammar school at Brentwood, Essex, where he appears to have died at an advanced age in 1609. His only work is Syntaxis et Prosodia, versiculis compositæ, Cambridge, 1590, 8vo.
