= Jack Yuill =

English footballer (1885–1916)

Personal information
- Full name: John George Yuill
- Date of birth: 2 October 1885
- Place of birth: Hendon, England
- Date of death: 9 July 1916 (aged 30)
- Place of death: Trônes Wood, France
- Position: Outside right

Senior career*
Years	Team	Apps	(Gls)
- Northern Nomads
- Sale Holmfield
1906–1907	Manchester City	0	(0)
1907	Oldham Athletic	0	(0)
1907	Northern Nomads		
1907	Stockport County	1	(0)
- Wigan Town
1909	Wrexham	1	(0)
1909	Manchester City	3	(1)
- Chester
1910	Wrexham	1	(0)
- Chester
1911	Port Vale	4	(1)
- Northern Nomads
- * Club domestic league appearances and goals

John George Yuill (2 October 1885 – 9 July 1916) was an English amateur footballer who played in the Football League for Manchester City and Stockport County as an outside right.

== Early life and playing career ==
Yuill attended Manchester Grammar School. During the early part of his football career, he worked for the printing firm Henry Blacklock & Co. Ltd in Manchester. As a footballer, Yuill played for Northern Nomads, Sale Holmfield, Manchester City, Oldham Athletic, Stockport County, Wrexham, Chester and Port Vale. He scored one goal in four Central League appearances for Port Vale during the 1911–12 season.

== World War I ==
In September 1914, one month into the First World War, Yuill enlisted as a private in the 19th (Service) Battalion of the Manchester Regiment. He was sent overseas with his battalion in November 1915 and went into the trenches near Berles-au-Bois the following month. By June 1916, Yuill had been promoted to corporal and was operating as part of a Lewis gun section. He took part in the successful attacks of the 30th Division on the first day on the Somme and was promoted to lance sergeant after the Capture of Montauban. Yuill was killed during the Capture of Trônes Wood on 9 July 1916 and is commemorated on the Thiepval Memorial.

== Career statistics ==
Appearances and goals by club, season and competition
Club	Season	League			FA Cup		Other		Total	
Club	Season	Division	Apps	Goals	Apps	Goals	Apps	Goals	Apps	Goals
Stockport County	1907–08	Second Division	1	0	0	0	―		1	0
Wrexham	1908–09	Birmingham and District League	1	0	―		1 (Note: Appearance in Welsh Cup)	0	2	0
Manchester City	1908–09	First Division	3	1	0	0	―		3	1
Wrexham	1910–11	Birmingham and District League	1	0	―		―		1	0
Wrexham	Total		2	0	―		1	9	3	0
Port Vale	1911–12	Central League	4	1	0	0	―		4	1
Career total			9	2	0	0	1	0	10	2
