= Tommy Farrell (footballer, born 1887) =

English footballer

Personal information
- Full name: Thomas Farrell
- Date of birth: 1887
- Place of birth: Earlestown, England
- Date of death: 1 July 1916 (aged 28–29)
- Place of death: Hawthorn Ridge Redoubt, France
- Position: Inside left

Senior career*
Years	Team	Apps	(Gls)
1904–1905	Woolwich Arsenal		
1905–1908	Manchester City	3	(0)
1908–1909	Airdrieonians	15	(1)
1909–1910	Eccles Borough		
- * Club domestic league appearances and goals

Thomas Farrell (1887 – 1 July 1916) was an English professional footballer who played in the Football League for Manchester City as an inside left. He also played in the Scottish League for Airdrieonians.

== Personal life ==
Farrell was married with three children. He enlisted as a private in the Lancashire Fusiliers soon after the outbreak of the First World War in 1914. Farrell was posted to the 1st Battalion serving at Gallipoli in July 1915 and was evacuated in January 1916. Now a corporal, Farrell died in the Fusiliers' attack on the Hawthorn Ridge Redoubt on the first day of the Somme. A mine was detonated in the redoubt at 7:20 am and supporting infantry attacked the redoubt at around 7:30, but most were killed by machine gun fire, including Farrell. He was buried in Auchonvillers Military Cemetery.

== Career statistics ==
Appearances and goals by club, season and competition
Club	Season	League			National Cup		Total	
Club	Season	Division	Apps	Goals	Apps	Goals	Apps	Goals
Manchester City	1906–07	First Division	3	0	0	0	3	0
Airdrieonians	1907–08	Scottish First Division	9	1	0	0	9	1
Airdrieonians	1908–09	Scottish First Division	6	0	0	0	6	0
Airdrieonians	Total		15	1	0	0	15	1
Career total			18	1	0	0	18	1
