= Murdoch McCormack =

Scottish footballer

Personal information
- Full name: Murdoch McCormack
- Date of birth: 7 October 1920
- Place of birth: Glasgow, Scotland
- Date of death: 22 April 1951 (aged 30)
- Place of death: Glasgow, Scotland
- Position: Winger

Youth career
- Rangers

Senior career*
Years	Team	Apps	(Gls)
1946–1947	Manchester City	1	(0)
1947–1948	Blackpool	12	(3)
1948–1949	Crewe Alexandra	31	(3)
Total		44	(6)
- * Club domestic league appearances and goals

Murdoch McCormack (7 October 1920 – 22 April 1951) was a Scottish footballer, who played as a winger in the Football League for Manchester City, Blackpool and Crewe Alexandra.

After making only one League appearance for Manchester City, in 1946–47, McCormack joined Joe Smith's Blackpool the following season. He made eleven starts in the first fourteen League games, scoring twice in a 4–0 victory over Huddersfield Town at Bloomfield Road on 1 September, and Blackpool's goal in a 1–1 draw at Blackburn Rovers a fortnight later.

His final appearance for Blackpool came on 21 February, a single-goal defeat at Manchester City.

In the summer of 1948, he joined Crewe Alexandra, for whom he made 31 League appearances and scored three goals in his only season with the club.
