= Leo Dunne =

Irish footballer

Personal information
- Full name: Leo Christopher Dunne
- Date of birth: 17 June 1908
- Place of birth: Dublin, Ireland
- Date of death: 1990 (aged 81–82)
- Place of death: Swindon, England
- Position: Defender

Senior career*
Years	Team	Apps	(Gls)
1928-1933	Drumcondra		(4)
1933–1935	Manchester City	3	(0)
1935–1936	Hull City	8	(0)
1936–1937	Floriana		
1937–1938	Shelbourne		
1938–1940	Drumcondra		

International career
1935	Ireland	2	(0)
- * Club domestic league appearances and goals

Leo Dunne was an Irish footballer during the 1930s.

== Career ==
A left back, he was capped twice for the Irish Free State making his debut against Switzerland in May 1935. He won his second, and final cap, in the subsequent game against Germany in Dortmund during the same tour.

Born in Dublin, possibly in 1908, between spells at Drumcondra in Dublin he played for Manchester City and Hull City in England from 1933 to 1936. He was mainly a reserve player at Manchester City to Bill Dale. Described in Tony Matthews' book "Manchester City: Player by Player" as "a first class defender", he made almost sixty appearances for the Blues' second team before moving to Hull.

The Winnipeg Tribune reported on 23 March 1935 "Leo Dunne is one of seven or eight very good backs at Manchester City. The other day Swindon Town asked if they might talk transfer with the City. It was arranged. Leo appeared "by request" in a game. He played so well that the City directors instantly decided that he was not to be transferred. Sooner or later though, the City will have to unload some back talent." Dunne Would only make eight appearances for Hull during the 1936-36 season.

Dunne returned to Ireland in 1936 joining Shelbourne, and he later returned to Drumcondra where he played until 1940. At some point during or after the war he moved back to England and settled in Swindon, where he died in 1990.
