= Chris Glennon =

English footballer

Personal information
- Full name: Christopher David Glennon
- Date of birth: 29 October 1949
- Place of birth: Manchester, England
- Date of death: 10 May 2016 (aged 66)
- Place of death: Salford, England
- Position: Forward

Senior career*
Years	Team	Apps	(Gls)
1968–1971	Manchester City	4	(0)
1970–1971	→ Tranmere Rovers (loan)	2	(0)
- → Northwich Victoria (loan)
- * Club domestic league appearances and goals

Christopher David Glennon (29 October 1949 – 10 May 2016) was an English footballer who played as a forward in the Football League for Manchester City and Tranmere Rovers.
