= Ken Taylor (footballer, born 1931) =

English footballer (1931–2016)

Personal information
- Full name: Kenneth Gordon Taylor
- Date of birth: 15 March 1931
- Place of birth: South Shields, England
- Date of death: April 2016 (aged 85)
- Position: Full back

Senior career*
Years	Team	Apps	(Gls)
- North Shields
1954–1964	Blackburn Rovers	200	(0)
- Morecambe
- * Club domestic league appearances and goals

Kenneth Gordon Taylor (15 March 1931 – April 2016) was an English association football full back who played in the Football League for Blackburn Rovers.
