= Richard Jones (footballer, born 1879) =

Welsh footballer

Richard T. W. Jones
Personal information
- Date of birth: 1879
- Place of birth: Wales

Senior career*
Years	Team	Apps	(Gls)
- Millwall Athletic
1901-1902	Manchester City	9	(2)

International career
1906	Wales	2	(0)
- * Club domestic league appearances and goals

Richard Jones (born 1879) was a Welsh international footballer. He was part of the Wales national football team, playing 2 matches. He played his first match on 3 March 1906 against Scotland and his last match on 2 April 1906 against Ireland. At club level, he played for Millwall Athletic and Manchester City.

Richard also made four FA Cup appearances for City without scoring

== See also ==
- List of Wales international footballers (alphabetical)
