= Robert Syme =

Scottish footballer

Personal information
- Place of birth: South Queensferry, Scotland
- Position: Centre forward

Senior career*
Years	Team	Apps	(Gls)
- Dunfermline Athletic
1931–1934	Manchester City	11	(2)
1934–1935	Burnley	9	(0)
- Dunfermline Athletic
Total		20	(2)
- * Club domestic league appearances and goals

Robert G. Syme was a Scottish professional footballer who played as a centre forward. He played a total of 20 matches in the English Football League and scored two goals.
