= Mike Batty (footballer) =

English footballer

Michael Batty
Personal information
- Full name: Michael Batty
- Date of birth: 10 July 1944 (age 82)
- Place of birth: Manchester, England
- Position: Centre half

Senior career*
Years	Team	Apps	(Gls)
1962–1965	Manchester City	13	(0)
- Rhyl
1966–1973	Mossley	320	(20)
Total		333	(20)
- * Club domestic league appearances and goals

Michael Batty is a footballer who played as a centre half in the Football League for Manchester City.
