= Cerezo Fung a Wing =

Surinamese-Dutch footballer

Personal information
- Full name: Cerezo Fung a Wing
- Date of birth: 24 September 1983 (age 43)
- Place of birth: Paramaribo, Suriname
- Height: 1.80 m (5 ft 11 in)
- Position: Left wing back

Team information
- Current team: Rijsoord (Head of academy)

Youth career
- SV Bijlmer
- SC Voorland
- Abcoude

Senior career*
Years	Team	Apps	(Gls)
2001–2005	Volendam	83	(3)
2005	→ RKC (loan)	4	(0)
2005–2007	RKC	17	(0)
2007–2010	De Graafschap	56	(4)
2010–2012	IJsselmeervogels	86	(3)
2012–2014	Ajax Zaterdag		

International career
2002	Netherlands U19	1	(0)
- * Club domestic league appearances and goals as of 7 August 2010

Cerezo Fung a Wing (born 24 September 1983 in Paramaribo, Suriname) is a Dutch retired football defender, who is Head of the Academy at amateur side Rijsoord.

His ancestors came from China and moved to Suriname. "Fung A Wing" is his ancestor's full name and in fact, in accordance with the habits of the Chinese people, his real last name is Fung (馮).

== Club career ==
He made his professional league debut for Volendam in a 5–1 victory over Helmond Sport on 19 October 2001. He played for Volendam for four seasons, making a total of 83 league appearances. Fung a Wing then joined RKC Waalwijk initially on loan in 2005. He made the move permanent in the summer of 2005 and remained with the club until signing for De Graafschap in 2007. He was contracted with De Graafschap until 2010 and joined amateur side IJsselmeervogels thereafter.

After leaving IJsselmeervogels, he played for Ajax Amateurs, NOC Kralingen, Alliance and Slikkerveer, where he was Head of the Academy until his resignation in 2023.

== International career ==
Fung a Wing was capped once by the Netherlands national under-19 football team.

== Honours ==
De Graafschap

- Eerste Divisie: 2009–10
