= George Heineman =

English footballer

George Heinemann
Personal information
- Full name: George Henry Heinemann
- Date of birth: 17 December 1905
- Place of birth: Stafford, England
- Date of death: 1970 (aged 64–65)
- Place of death: Wellington, Shropshire, England
- Height: 5 ft 9 in (1.75 m)
- Position: Defender

Senior career*
Years	Team	Apps	(Gls)
?–1928	Stafford Rangers		
1928–1931	Manchester City	21	(0)
1931–1934	Coventry City		
1934–1935	Crystal Palace	25	(0)
1935–1938	Clapton Orient	86	(1)
1938–?	Wellington Town		
- * Club domestic league appearances and goals

George Henry Heinemann (17 December 1905 – 1970) was an English professional footballer who played in the Football League for Manchester City, Coventry City, Crystal Palace and Clapton Orient as a defender.

== Career ==
Heinemann was born in Stafford and began his career with Stafford Rangers. He moved to Manchester City on 29 October 1928, and made 24 appearances in all competitions for the Sky Blues. He joined Coventry City in May 1931 and stayed for two seasons. He scored one goal for Coventry, in a 5–5 draw against Fulham in January 1932.

He signed for Crystal Palace in August 1934. Over the next season, he made 25 appearances for Palace, without scoring. In August 1935, he moved on to Clapton Orient, playing in East London for three seasons. He left in January 1938 to join Wellington Town, and he won the Welsh Cup with them in 1939–40.

Heinemann died in 1970 aged 64–65.
