= Bobby Cunliffe (footballer, born 1945) =

English footballer

Personal information
- Full name: Robert Cunliffe
- Date of birth: 17 May 1945 (age 81)
- Place of birth: Manchester, England
- Position: Inside forward

Senior career*
Years	Team	Apps	(Gls)
1963–1964	Manchester City	3	(1)
1965–1966	York City	12	(2)
- Witton Albion
Total		15	(3)
- * Club domestic league appearances and goals

Bobby Cunliffe (born 17 May 1945) is an English former professional footballer who played as an inside forward in the Football League for Manchester City and York City.

In the 1970–71 season he played six times (scoring one goal) for Mossley.
