= David Donald (footballer) =

Scottish footballer

Personal information
- Date of birth: 9 November 1987 (age 38)
- Place of birth: Aberdeen, Scotland
- Position: Defender

Youth career
- Glendale

Senior career*
Years	Team	Apps	(Gls)
2004–2007	Aberdeen	2	(0)
2007–2012	Peterhead	157	(1)
- * Club domestic league appearances and goals as of 25 June 2015

David Martin Donald (born 9 November 1987) is a Scottish former professional footballer who played as a defender.

Donald started his career with Glendale boys club Aberdeen before moving to Dee's boys club before signing for pro forms for Aberdeen and became the youngest player in their history when he made his debut on 15 May 2004 against Dundee at Pittodrie. He only made one other appearance for Aberdeen and he was released at the end of the 2006-07 season.

Donald was quickly signed by Peterhead after his release by the Dons. David went on to play for Woodside amateurs where he became a legend winning multiple titles
