= Trevor Ogden (footballer) =

English footballer

Personal information
- Full name: Trevor Ogden
- Date of birth: 12 June 1945 (age 81)
- Place of birth: Culcheth, England
- Position: Centre forward

Senior career*
Years	Team	Apps	(Gls)
1964–1965	Manchester City	9	(3)
1965–1967	Doncaster Rovers	39	(14)
- Witton Albion
- * Club domestic league appearances and goals

Trevor Ogden (born 12 June 1945) is an English footballer, who played as a centre forward in the Football League for Manchester City and Doncaster Rovers.
