= John Greenwood (footballer) =

English footballer

Personal information
- Full name: John Jones Greenwood
- Date of birth: 22 January 1921
- Place of birth: Manchester, England
- Date of death: 25 November 1994 (aged 73)
- Place of death: Manchester, England
- Position: Wing half

Senior career*
Years	Team	Apps	(Gls)
1946–1949	Manchester City	1	(0)
1949–1951	Exeter City	31	(2)
1951	Aldershot	12	(0)
1951	Halifax Town	0	(0)
Total		44	(2)
- * Club domestic league appearances and goals

John Jones Greenwood (1921–1994) was a footballer who played as a wing half in the Football League for Manchester City, Exeter City and Aldershot.
