= James Whittaker (footballer) =

English footballer

Personal information
- Full name: James Henry Whittaker
- Date of birth: 1882
- Place of birth: Bolton, England
- Date of death: 1949 (aged 66–67)
- Position: Winger

Senior career*
Years	Team	Apps	(Gls)
1904–1905	Barnsley	0	(0)
1905–1906	Manchester City	6	(1)
1907–1908	Clapton Orient	17	(1)
Total		23	(2)
- * Club domestic league appearances and goals

James Henry Whittaker (1882–1949) was an English footballer who played in the Football League for Clapton Orient and Manchester City.
