= Ken Taylor (footballer, born 1936) =

English footballer (1936–2017)

Personal information
- Full name: Kenneth Vincent Taylor
- Date of birth: 18 June 1936
- Place of birth: Manchester, England
- Date of death: 5 December 2017 (aged 81)
- Place of death: Ashton-under-Lyne, England
- Position: Full back

Senior career*
Years	Team	Apps	(Gls)
- Manchester Transport FC
1954–1960	Manchester City	1	(0)
- Buxton FC
- * Club domestic league appearances and goals

Kenneth Vincent Taylor (18 June 1936 – 5 December 2017) was an English footballer, who played as a full back in the Football League for Manchester City. Taylor died in Ashton-under-Lyne on 5 December 2017, at the age of 81.
