= Howard White (footballer) =

English footballer

Personal information
- Full name: Howard Kenneth White
- Date of birth: 2 March 1954 (age 72)
- Place of birth: Timperley, England
- Position: Defender

Senior career*
Years	Team	Apps	(Gls)
1970–1971	Manchester City	1	(0)
- * Club domestic league appearances and goals

Howard Kenneth White (born 2 March 1954) is an English footballer, who played as a defender in the Football League for Manchester City.
