= James William Whittaker =

English watercolour landscape artist (1828-1876)

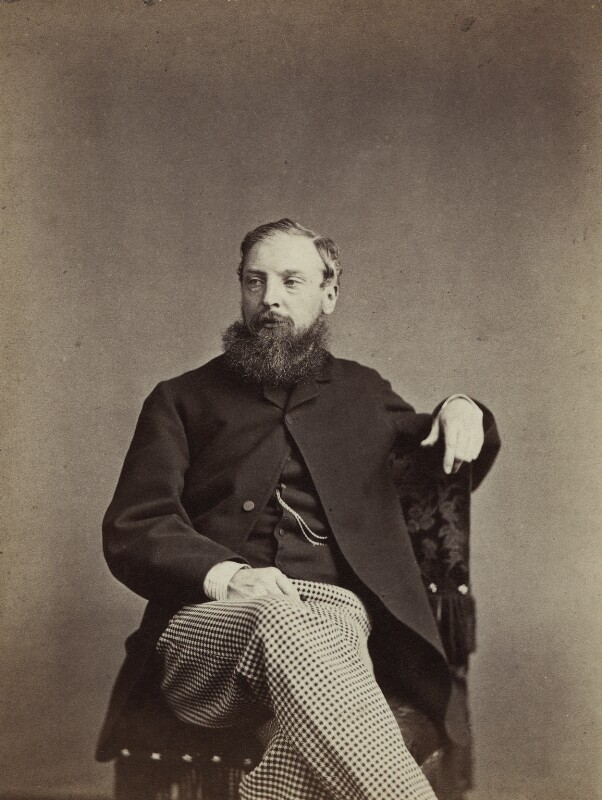
- Whittaker as a member of Society of Painters in Watercolours in 1864
- Born: 1828; Manchester, England
- Died: 6 September 1876 (aged 47–48); Betws-y-Coed, North Wales
- Known for: landscape paintings
- Spouse: Sarah Heyes

James William Whittaker (1828, Manchester - 6 September 1876, Betws-y-Coed) was a British watercolour painter, best known for his landscapes of North Wales.

== Life ==
He was born in a family of a warehouseman and began his artistic career as an apprentice to Manchester engraver Joseph Heyes, soon turning to painting. In 1858 he moved to Llanrwst, where he would paint local landscapes in watercolours. With the possible exception of a trip to Switzerland and Italy in about 1864 and a Northern journey in the late 1860s, he remained in North Wales for the rest of his life. Upon meeting Francis William Topham in Wales, Whittaker was encouraged to join the Society of Painters in Watercolours, becoming an associate in 1862, and a member in 1864. He died in 1876 by drowning in River Llugwy, where he fell trying to collect his painting gear. Whittaker was married to Sarah nee Heyes (daughter of Joseph Heyes), widowing her and leaving 4 children who outlived him.

== Gallery ==
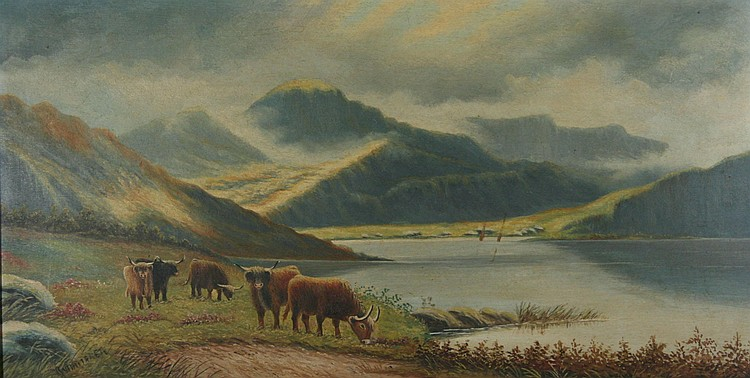

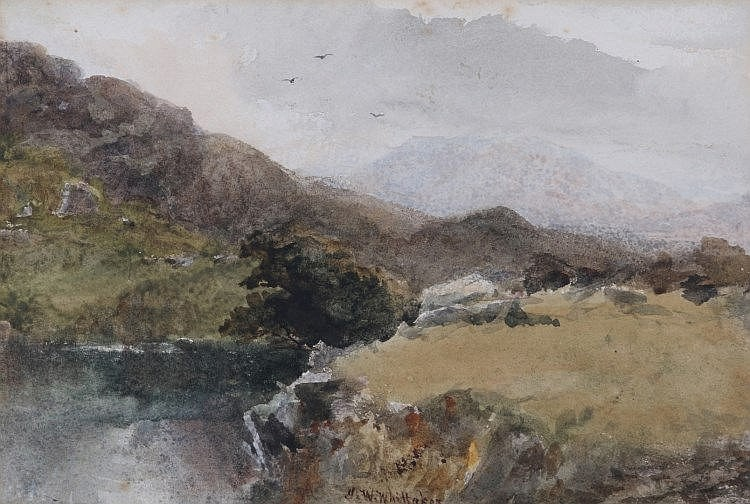

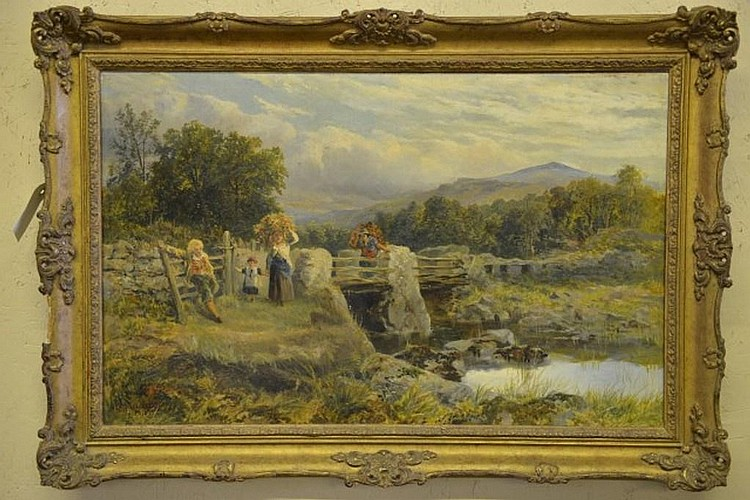

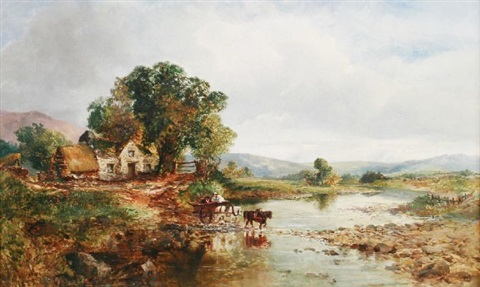

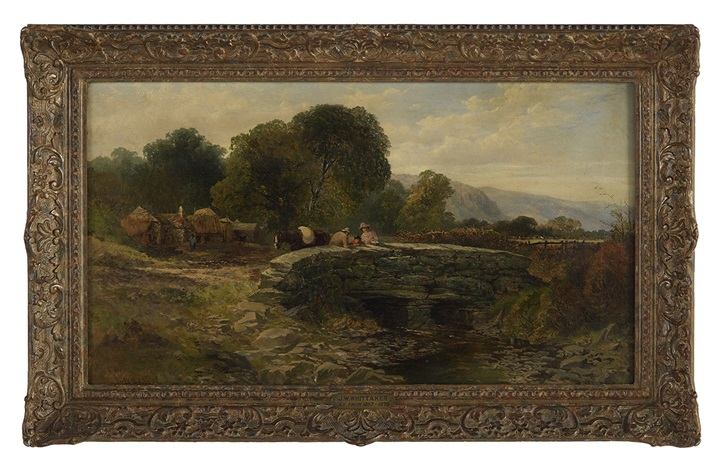

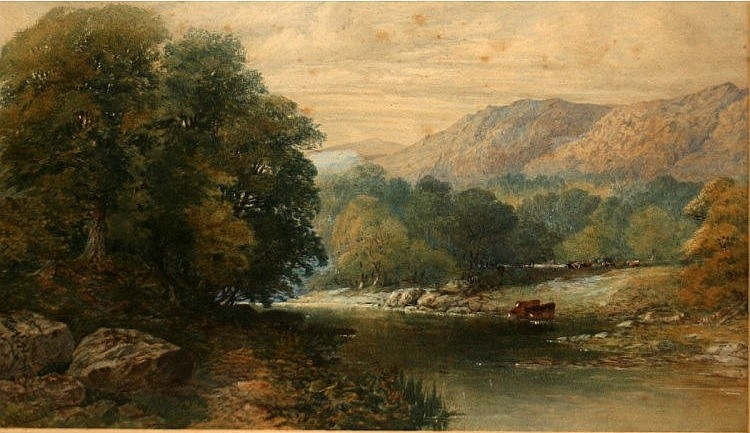

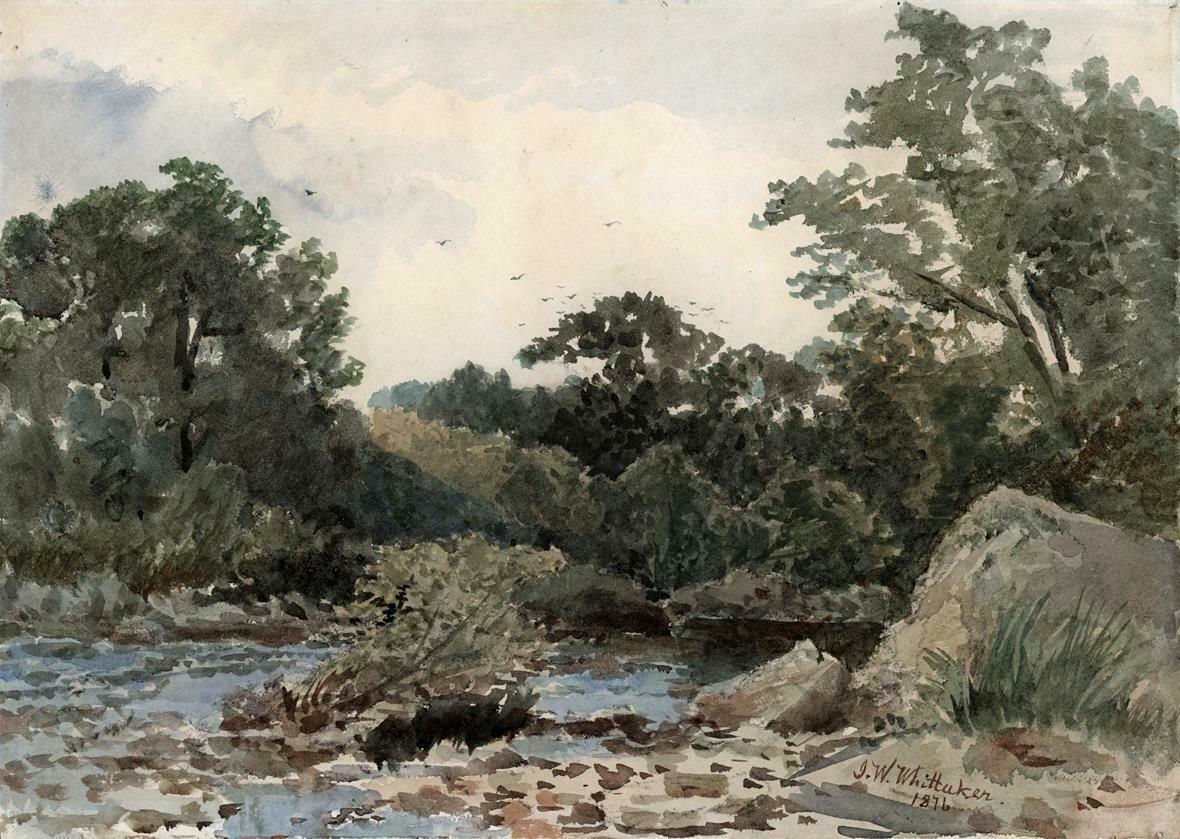

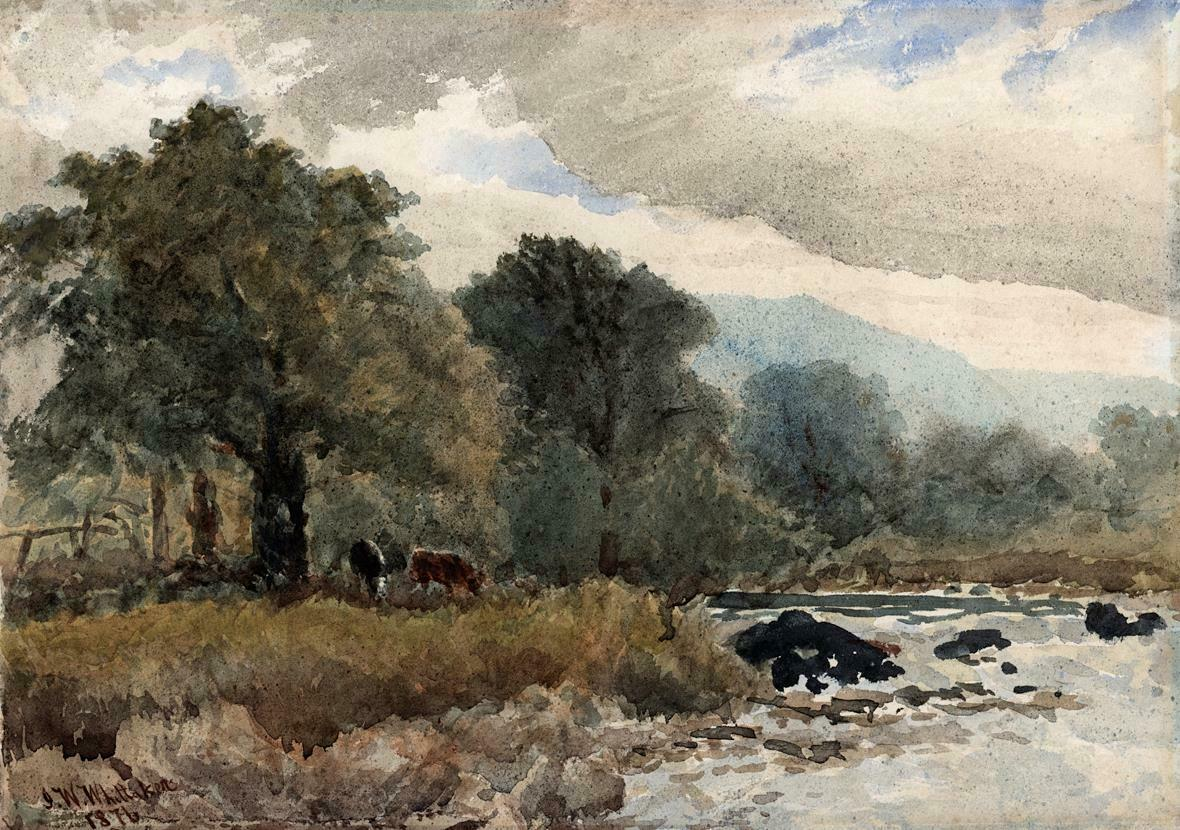

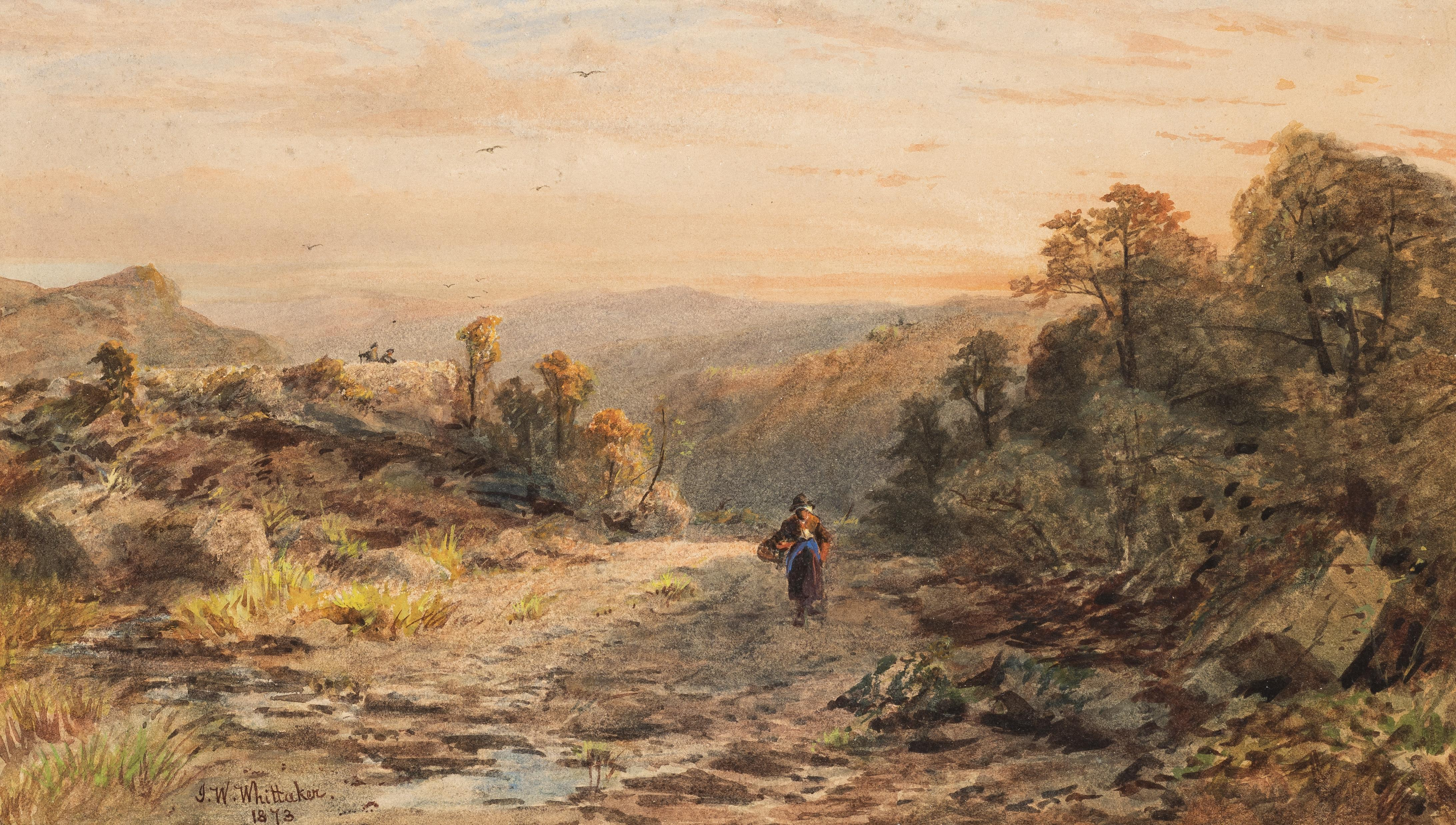
