= Jonathan Smith (footballer, born 1988) =

English footballer

Personal information
- Full name: Jonathan Smith
- Date of birth: 31 October 1988 (age 38)
- Place of birth: Wigan, England
- Position: Forward

Youth career
- Liverpool
- –2007: Wigan Athletic

Senior career*
Years	Team	Apps	(Gls)
2007–2008	Aberdeen	1	(0)
2008–2009	Halifax Town		
2009–2010	Peterhead	9	(0)
2010–2013	Keith		
2013–2018	Cove Rangers		
2018–2020	Inverurie Loco Works		
2020–2023	Formartine United		
2023	Inverurie Loco Works		
- * Club domestic league appearances and goals as of 17:37, 24 December 2023 (UTC)

Jonathan Smith (born 31 October 1988) is an English professional footballer who plays as a forward.

== Career ==
Born in Wigan, Smith played with the youth teams of Liverpool and Wigan Athletic before signing for Aberdeen in the summer of 2007.

After being out of the game for a year, Smith signed for Peterhead in August 2009. His time with the club was hampered by injuries and he left Peterhead at the end of the 2009–10 season.
