= Dan Smith (footballer, born 1986) =

English association footballer

Personal information
- Full name: Daniel Smith
- Date of birth: 5 October 1986 (age 40)
- Place of birth: Sunderland, England
- Height: 5 ft 10 in (1.78 m)
- Position: Full back

Senior career*
Years	Team	Apps	(Gls)
2004–2006	Sunderland	3	(0)
2006	→ Huddersfield Town (loan)	8	(0)
2006–2008	Aberdeen	9	(0)
2008	St Johnstone (trial)	3	(0)
2008–2009	Gateshead	11	(0)
2010	Blyth Spartans	0	(0)
2011–2012	Chester-le-Street Town		
2012	Darlington 1883		
2012–2013	Dunston UTS		
2013	Seaham Red Star		
2013–2014	Gateshead	0	(0)
2014–2017	Holland Park Hawks	46	(9)
2017	Peninsula Power		

International career
2001–2002	England U16	8	(0)
2002	England U17	7	(1)
- * Club domestic league appearances and goals as of 11:35, 18 March 2016 (UTC)

Daniel Smith (born 5 October 1986) is an English former professional footballer.

A full back, he previously played professionally in the Premier League for Sunderland, in the Football League for Huddersfield Town, and in the Scottish Premier League for Aberdeen. He also appeared in the Scottish Football League as a triallist for St Johnstone, and played in non-League football for Gateshead, Blyth Spartans, Chester-le-Street Town, Darlington 1883, Dunston UTS and Seaham Red Star. He ended his career in Australia, playing for state-level sides Holland Park Hawks and Peninsula Power.

== Club career ==
=== Sunderland ===
Smith was born in Sunderland, and began his football career with his home-town club. He made his Sunderland first-team debut in the Football League Cup second round against Cheltenham Town in September 2005, in which he was sent off, receiving two bookings. In January 2006, he joined Football League One club Huddersfield Town on a month's loan, later extended for a second month, during which he played eight League games.

After returning to Sunderland, Smith played in three Premier League matches at the end of the season, in the last of which he committed a tackle, described in The Independent as a "studs-up lunge", on Arsenal player Abou Diaby, causing the player to suffer a fractured ankle and ruptured ankle ligaments. Arsenal initially threatened legal action over the incident, with Diaby out of action for eight months.

=== Scotland ===
Despite having signed a new one-year deal with Sunderland during the summer of 2006, Smith joined Scottish Premier League (SPL) club Aberdeen in August on a three-year contract. He made his debut appearance in the Dons' 1–1 draw against St Mirren in the SPL. After making just 13 appearances for the club, he was released at the end of the 2007–08 season.

After trial spells at Port Vale and Darlington, Smith turned out as a trialist for St Johnstone in their First Division match against Morton on 9 August 2008. Following that match, Saints manager Derek McInnes confirmed that Smith would continue to train with the squad for a week, and he played in the next two matches, but was not offered a contract.

=== Later career ===
Smith joined Conference North side Gateshead on 20 November 2008. He made ten starts, all but one in the league, and two substitute appearances, and was released at the end of the season.

In March 2010, Smith signed for Blyth Spartans, also of the Conference North, with a view to regaining fitness. With the club in an injury crisis, he was named once on the substitutes' bench, but never appeared for the club. In the 2011–12 season, he played for Chester-le-Street Town in the Northern League second division.

Smith was one of Martin Gray's first batch of signings as new manager of Darlington 1883, demoted to the Northern League First Division for 2012–13. Smith was released by Darlington at the end of November and signed for Dunston UTS in December. On 27 February 2013, Smith joined Seaham Red Star.

On 19 July 2013, Smith rejoined Gateshead, managed by his brother Anth, after a trial spell during pre season. On 31 January 2014, Smith had his contract cancelled to allow him to pursue his career abroad.

He landed in Australia where he joined Holland Park Hawks, captaining the side to consecutive promotions. In 2017, he left the club midseason to join Peninsula Power. He later returned to the North East, setting up a spray painting business.

== International career ==
Smith made eight appearances for the England under-16 side between 2001 and 2002. He featured in the Victory Shield, Walkers International Tournament and in the Tournoi de Montaigu. He made seven appearances for the England under-17 side in 2002, scoring once, playing in the Nordic Cup.
