= Karim Touzani =

Dutch footballer (born 1980)

Personal information
- Date of birth: 11 September 1980 (age 46)
- Place of birth: Amsterdam, Netherlands
- Height: 1.84 m (6 ft 1/2 in)
- Positions: Midfielder; defender

Youth career
- DCG
- 1996–1999: Ajax

Senior career*
Years	Team	Apps	(Gls)
1999–2004	Utrecht	68	(1)
2004–2006	Twente	21	(2)
2006–2008	Aberdeen	25	(1)
2008–2011	Sparta Rotterdam	19	(0)

International career
	Netherlands U21	3	(0)
- * Club domestic league appearances and goals as of 30 December 2010

Karim Touzani (born 11 September 1980) is a Dutch former footballer who played as a midfielder or a defender

== Club career ==
Born in Amsterdam, Touzani came through the Ajax academy, but failed to make the first team. He then went on to play for FC Utrecht and FC Twente, an identical history to former Aberdeen and Scotland striker Scott Booth. While playing for Utrecht, he was just about to make a £1.5 million move to PSV Eindhoven, until an unfortunate training ground injury. He suffered a cracked tibia and fibula, after an ill-timed lunge tackle by Dirk Kuyt.

He signed a one-year deal with Aberdeen in June 2006 but was plagued by injury throughout his first season in Scotland. In July 2008, Touzani completed a free transfer to Dutch outfit Sparta Rotterdam. Touzani's contract was not renewed for the 2011–12 season, this implicated the end of his professional football career.

== International career ==
He played for the Netherlands youth team, alongside Rafael van der Vaart.
