= Jeffrey de Visscher =

Dutch footballer

Jeffrey De Visscher
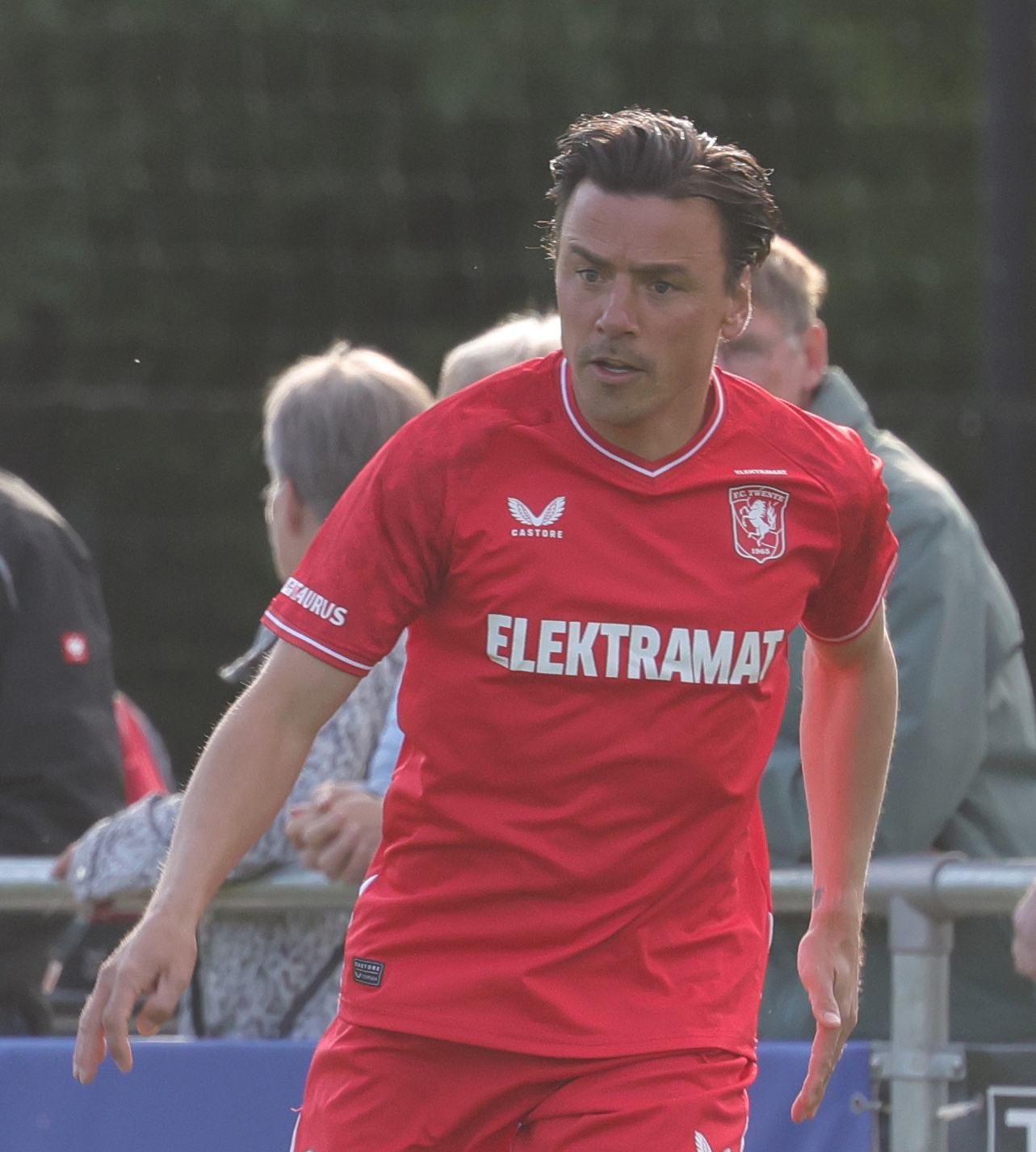

Personal information
- Date of birth: 5 May 1981 (age 45)
- Place of birth: Almelo, Netherlands
- Height: 1.74 m (5 ft 9 in)
- Position: Winger

Senior career*
Years	Team	Apps	(Gls)
2000–2005	Twente	21	(2)
2001–2002	FC Emmen (loan)	11	(3)
2004–2005	Heracles Almelo (loan)	38	(10)
2005–2007	De Graafschap	76	(21)
2007–2009	Aberdeen	32	(1)
2009–2010	Cambuur	56	(14)
2010–2012	FC Emmen	54	(4)
2013–2014	SC Genemuiden	2	(0)
2014–2016	Rohda Raalte		
- * Club domestic league appearances and goals

Jeffrey De Visscher (born 5 May 1981) is a Dutch former professional footballer who played as a winger.

== Career ==
=== Twente ===
Born in Almelo, Netherlands, De Visscher joined FC Twente at the age of 14 and went on to sign professional terms with the club at the age of 18. He struggled to make the impact he was predicted to. However, after a successful loan spell at FC Emmen followed, and while he was there, he impressed his coach at FC Twente to the extent that De Visscher was offered a three-year deal with the club. However, he only played 21 games in two seasons, and was eventually moved out on loan to Heracles Almelo, where he helped the club gain promotion to the Eredivisie.

=== De Graafschap ===
De Visscher signed a two-year deal with De Graafschap once his contract with FC Twente had ended, and helped the club become champions of the Eerste Divisie.

=== Aberdeen ===
In May 2007, De Visscher signed a two-year deal with Aberdeen. He made a promising debut in a friendly against non-league Cove Rangers. He made only 16 starting appearances in his first season, however he did manage two goals in the Scottish Cup, one came in a reply against Falkirk and the other came against Celtic in a quarter-final tie. Aberdeen were later knocked out in the semi-finals against lower opposition; Queen of the South.

In the SPL he made a lot of substitute appearances, and towards the end of the season, he began to be a first team regular. De Visscher's only league goal came against Hearts in a 4–1 defeat.

During the summer of 2008, Aberdeen manager Jimmy Calderwood told an Aberdeen local paper, to expect big things from the Dutch winger. Subsequently, he was handed the number 17 shirt for Aberdeen's season of 2008–2009.

=== Cambuur-Leeuwarden ===
In January 2009 he joined SC Cambuur-Leeuwarden.

=== Emmen ===
In August 2010 he signed for FC Emmen.
