= 2011–12 Aberdeen F.C. season =

Aberdeen
2011–12 season
- Chairman: Stewart Milne
- Manager: Craig Brown
- Stadium: Pittodrie Stadium
- Scottish Premier League: 9th
- Scottish Cup: Semi final
- Scottish League Cup: Round 3
- Top goalscorer: League: Scott Vernon: 11; All: Scott Vernon: 13
- Highest home attendance: 15,468 vs. Rangers, 29 October 2011
- Lowest home attendance: 3,964 vs. East Fife, 20 September 2011
- Average home league attendance: 8,770
Home colours	Away colours

The 2011–12 season was Aberdeen's 99th season in the top flight of Scottish football. Aberdeen competed in the Scottish Premier League, Scottish Cup and Scottish League Cup. Aberdeen were knocked out of the Scottish League Cup at the third round stage, losing on penalties to East Fife after a 3–3 draw. In the Scottish Cup, Aberdeen lost 1–2 to Hibernian in the semi-final. Aberdeen finished in 9th place in the Scottish Premier League.

== Results and fixtures ==
Win Draw Loss

=== Pre-season ===
23 June 2011 Friendly	Brechin City	1–3	Aberdeen	Brechin
19:45	McKenna 54'	Report	Megginson 9'; Bengondo 37'; Mackie 45'	Stadium: Glebe Park; Attendance: 1,002

6 July 2011 Friendly	VfL Bochum	2–1	Aberdeen	Bochum
18:30	Ginczek 42'; Aydın 90'	AFC Report	Mackie 85'	Stadium: Ruhrstadion; Attendance: 2,000

9 July 2011 Friendly	Borussia Mönchengladbach	5–2	Aberdeen	Mönchengladbach
15:00	Rupp 20'; Leckie 46', 80'; Hanke 74', 76'	AFC Report	Magennis 15'; Jack 87'	Stadium: Grenzlandstadion; Attendance: 2,200

12 July 2011 Friendly	Deveronvale	0–2	Aberdeen	Banff
19:45		AFC report	Considine 50'; Pawlett 65'	Stadium: Princess Royal Park; Attendance: 251

13 July 2011 Friendly	Inverurie Loco Works	1–11	Aberdeen	Inverurie
19:45	Neish 69'	AFC Report	Mackie 37'; Megginson 44'; Magennis 50' (pen.); Arnason 55'; Jack 71'; Vernon 71'; Milsom 77', 79'; Paton 82', 86', 89'	Stadium: Harlaw Park; Attendance: 400

16 July 2011 Friendly	Forfar Athletic	0–3	Aberdeen	Forfar
15:00		AFC Report	Vernon 18' (pen.); Jack 68'; Milsom 80'	Stadium: Station Park; Attendance: 874

19 July 2011 Friendly	Aberdeen	0–1	Villarreal	Aberdeen
19:45		AFC Report	Rossi 53'	Attendance: 9,508; Referee: Crawford Allan

=== Scottish Premier League ===
23 July 2011 1	Aberdeen	0–0	St Johnstone	Aberdeen
15:00		Report		Stadium: Pittodrie; Attendance: 10,001; Referee: Steve Conroy

30 July 2011 2	St Mirren	1–0	Aberdeen	Paisley
15:00	Hasselbaink 50'	Report		Stadium: St Mirren Park; Attendance: 5,011; Referee: Euan Norris

7 August 2011 3	Aberdeen	0–1	Celtic	Aberdeen
12:15			Stokes 74'	Stadium: Pittodrie; Attendance: 12,497; Referee: Calum Murray

13 August 2011 4	Heart of Midlothian	3–0	Aberdeen	Edinburgh
15:00	Novikovas 24'; Sutton 35', 52'	BBC Sport		Stadium: Tynecastle; Attendance: 13,374; Referee: Steve Conroy

20 August 2011 5	Aberdeen	2–1	Inverness Caledonian Thistle	Aberdeen
15:00	Milsom 12'; Vernon 27'	BBC Sport	Foran 79'	Stadium: Pittodrie; Attendance: 7,989; Referee: Crawford Allan

28 August 2011 6	Rangers	2–0	Aberdeen	Glasgow
15:00	Davis 15'; Naismith 90'	BBC Sport		Stadium: Ibrox; Attendance: 44,070; Referee: Iain Brines

11 September 2011 7	Hibernian	0–0	Aberdeen	Edinburgh
15:00		BBC Sport		Stadium: Easter Road; Attendance: 8,972; Referee: O'Reilly

17 September 2011 8	Aberdeen	2–2	Kilmarnock	Aberdeen
15:00	Considine 37'; Mawéné 53'	BBC Sport	Heffernan 15'; Shiels 28'	Stadium: Pittodrie; Attendance: 7,672; Referee: Iain Brines

24 September 2011 9	Motherwell	1–0	Aberdeen	Motherwell
15:00	McHugh 84'	BBC Sport		Stadium: Fir Park; Attendance: 4,348; Referee: Muir

30 September 2011 10	Aberdeen	4–0	Dunfermline Athletic	Aberdeen
19:45	Vernon 6', 35', 80'; Fyvie 45'	BBC Sport		Stadium: Pittodrie; Attendance: 8,333; Referee: Madden

15 October 2011 11	Aberdeen	3–1	Dundee United	Aberdeen
15:00	Árnason 14'; Mawéné 51'; Considine 60'	BBC Sport	Dalla Valle 79'	Stadium: Pittodrie; Attendance: 10,256; Referee: Collum

23 October 2011 12	Celtic	2–1	Aberdeen	Glasgow
15:00	Ki Sung-Yueng 17'; Mulgrew 72'	BBC Sport	Jack 59'	Stadium: Celtic Park; Attendance: 49,037; Referee: O'Reilly

29 October 2011 13	Aberdeen	1–2	Rangers	Aberdeen
12:00	Foster 82'	BBC Sport	Lafferty 58'; Jelavić 70' (pen.)	Stadium: Pittodrie; Attendance: 15,468; Referee: Collum

19 November 2011 15	Aberdeen	1–2	Motherwell	Aberdeen
15:00	Vernon 10'	BBC Sport	Higdon 6'; Daley 53'	Stadium: Pittodrie; Attendance: 8,779; Referee: Murray

26 November 2011 16	Dunfermline Athletic	3–3	Aberdeen	Dunfermline
15:00	Barrowman 54'; Graham 62'; Buchanan 69'	BBC Sport	Considine 45+2'; Keddie 81' (o.g.); Magennis 88'	Stadium: East End Park; Attendance: 4,149; Referee: Salmond

3 December 2011 17	Kilmarnock	2–0	Aberdeen	Kilmarnock
15:00	Harkins 5'; Dayton 65'	BBC Sport		Stadium: Rugby Park; Attendance: 4,367; Referee: Allan

10 December 2011 18	Aberdeen	2–2	St Mirren	Aberdeen
15:00	Vernon 1'; Fallon 17'	BBC Sport	McLean 34'; Carey 52'	Stadium: Pittodrie; Attendance: 9,452; Referee: Finnie

13 December 2011 14	St Johnstone	1–2	Aberdeen	Perth
19:45	Haber 90'	BBC Sport	Vernon 13'; Jack 79'	Stadium: McDiarmid Park; Attendance: 1,607; Referee: McLean

17 December 2011 19	Aberdeen	1–0	Hibernian	Aberdeen
12:30	Vernon 56' (pen.)	BBC Sport		Stadium: Pittodrie; Attendance: 7,137; Referee: Craig Thomson

24 December 2011 20	Inverness Caledonian Thistle	2–1	Aberdeen	Inverness
12:30	Golobart 64'; Tadé 69'	BBC Sport	Fallon 76'	Stadium: Caledonian Stadium; Attendance: 5,888; Referee: Muir

28 December 2011 21	Aberdeen	0–0	Heart of Midlothian	Aberdeen
19:45		BBC Sport		Stadium: Pittodrie; Attendance: 9,210; Referee: Winter

2 January 2012 22	Dundee United	1–2	Aberdeen	Dundee
15:00	Daly 6'	BBC Sport	Chalali 67'; Árnason 86'	Stadium: Tannadice; Attendance: 11,471; Referee: McLean

14 January 2012 23	Aberdeen	0–0	Kilmarnock	Aberdeen
15:00		BBC Sport		Stadium: Pittodrie; Attendance: 8,324; Referee: Murray

21 January 2012 24	Rangers	1–1	Aberdeen	Glasgow
15:00	Edu 67'	BBC Sport	Árnason 63'	Stadium: Ibrox; Attendance: 46,648; Referee: Brines

28 January 2012 25	Aberdeen	1–0	Dunfermline Athletic	Aberdeen
15:00	Vernon 24'	BBC Sport		Stadium: Pittodrie; Attendance: 8,081; Referee: Thomson

11 February 2012 26	Hibernian	0–0	Aberdeen	Edinburgh
15:00		BBC Sport		Stadium: Easter Road; Attendance: 10,100; Referee: Crawford

19 February 2012 27	Aberdeen	0–0	St Johnstone	Aberdeen
12:45		BBC Sport		Stadium: Pittodrie; Attendance: 6,936; Referee: Salmond

25 February 2012 28	St Mirren	1–1	Aberdeen	Paisley
12:00	Vernon 57'	BBC Sport	Hasselbaink 59'	Stadium: St Mirren Park; Attendance: 3,627; Referee: Steven McLean

3 March 2012 29	Aberdeen	1–1	Celtic	Aberdeen
12:00	Blackman 45' (o.g.)	BBC Sport	Stokes 28'	Stadium: Pittodrie; Attendance: 13,127; Referee: Craig Thomson

17 March 2012 30	Motherwell	1–0	Aberdeen	Motherwell
15:00	Hammell 22'	BBC Sport		Stadium: Fir Park; Attendance: 4,637; Referee: Iain Brines

24 March 2012 31	Aberdeen	0–1	Inverness Caledonian Thistle	Aberdeen
15:00		BBC Sport	Tadé 10'	Stadium: Pittodrie; Attendance: 8,939; Referee: Finnie

31 March 2012 32	Heart of Midlothian	3–0	Aberdeen	Edinburgh
15:00	McGowan 27'; Skácel 53', 89'	BBC Sport		Stadium: Tynecastle; Attendance: 13,292; Referee: Collum

7 April 2012 33	Aberdeen	3–1	Dundee United	Aberdeen
15:00	Mackie 12'; Chris Clark 68'; Jack 79'	BBC Sport	Daly 29'	Stadium: Pittodrie; Attendance: 8,439; Referee: Calum Murray

21 April 2012 34	Inverness Caledonian Thistle	0–2	Aberdeen	Inverness
15:00		BBC Sport	Golobart 46' (o.g.); Gillet 89' (o.g.)	Stadium: Caledonian Stadium; Attendance: 3,487; Referee: McLean

28 April 2012 35	Dunfermline Athletic	3–0	Aberdeen	Dunfermline
15:00	Cardle 56'; Kirk 68', 77'	BBC Sport		Stadium: East End Park; Attendance: 3,501; Referee: Charleston

2 May 2012 36	Aberdeen	1–2	Hibernian	Aberdeen
19:45	Vernon 53'	BBC Sport	Reynolds 7' (o.g.); O'Hanlon 17'	Stadium: Pittodrie Stadium; Attendance: 5,281; Referee: Murray

5 May 2012 37	Kilmarnock	1–1	Aberdeen	Kilmarnock
15:00	Shiels 53'	BBC Sport	Masson 30'	Stadium: Rugby Park; Attendance: 3,893; Referee: Colvin

12 May 2012 38	Aberdeen	0–0	St Mirren	Aberdeen
15:00		BBC Sport		Stadium: Pittodrie Stadium; Attendance: 10,716; Referee: Collum

=== Scottish League Cup ===
Aberdeen entered the Scottish League Cup in the second round stage, having not qualified for Europe in 2010–11. Darren Mackie scored the only goal of the game, as Aberdeen defeated First Division opponents Dundee. Aberdeen were knocked out in the third round by Second Division club East Fife.

23 August 2011 2nd round	Aberdeen	1–0	Dundee	Aberdeen
19:45	Mackie 16'	BBC Report		Stadium: Pittodrie Stadium; Attendance: 5,722; Referee: James McKendrick

20 September 2011 3rd round	Aberdeen	3–3 (3–4 p)	East Fife	Aberdeen
19:45	McArdle 40'; Mackie 47'; Fallon 90' (pen.)	BBC Sport	Wallace 31'; Park 54'; Floan 57'	Stadium: Pittodrie Stadium; Attendance: 3,964; Referee: Steven Mclean

=== Scottish Cup ===
Aberdeen entered the Scottish Cup in the fourth round stage.

7 January 2012 4th round	Forfar Athletic	0–4	Aberdeen	Forfar
15:00		BBC Sport	Vernon 31'; Chalali 41'; Fallon 71'; Megginson 84'	Stadium: Station Park; Attendance: 3,747; Referee: Colvin

4 February 2012 5th round	Aberdeen	1–1	Queen of the South	Aberdeen
15:00	Vernon 67'	BBC Sport	McLaughlin 54'	Stadium: Pittodrie Stadium; Attendance: 6,785; Referee: McLean

14 February 2012 5th round replay	Queen of the South	1–2	Aberdeen	Dumfries
19:45	McGuffie 58' (pen.)	BBC Sport	Fyvie 21'; Considine 90'	Stadium: Palmerston Park; Attendance: 3,102; Referee: Muir

11 March 2012 Quarter-final	Motherwell	1–2	Aberdeen	Motherwell
15:45	Law 79'	BBC Sport	Fallon 5', 41'	Stadium: Fir Park; Attendance: 7,640; Referee: Craig Thomson

14 April 2012 Semi final	Aberdeen	1–2	Hibernian	Glasgow
12:15	Fallon 59'	BBC Sport	O'Connor 3'; Griffiths 85'	Stadium: Hampden Park; Attendance: 28,278; Referee: Willie Collum

== Statistics ==
=== Appearances and goals ===
No.	Pos	Nat	Player	Total		SPL		Scottish Cup		League Cup	
No.	Pos	Nat	Player	Apps	Goals	Apps	Goals	Apps	Goals	Apps	Goals
1	GK	(Scotland) SCO	Jamie Langfield	4	0	4+0	0	0+0	0	0+0	0
2	DF	(Northern Ireland) NIR	Rory McArdle	32	1	20+5	0	5+0	0	1+1	1
3	DF	(Scotland) SCO	Ricky Foster	24	1	22+0	1	0+0	0	2+0	0
3	DF	(Scotland) SCO	Mark Reynolds	21	0	16+0	0	5+0	0	0+0	0
4	MF	(Togo) TOG	Yoann Folly	0	0	0+0	0	0+0	0	0+0	0
5	DF	(France) FRA	Youl Mawéné	25	2	19+3	2	1+1	0	0+1	0
6	DF	(Scotland) SCO	Andrew Considine	42	4	36+0	3	4+0	1	2+0	0
7	MF	(Scotland) SCO	Chris Clark	30	1	16+8	1	2+2	0	2+0	0
8	MF	(England) ENG	Robert Milsom	22	1	22+0	1	0+0	0	0+0	0
9	FW	(England) ENG	Scott Vernon	42	13	35+1	11	5+0	2	1+0	0
10	FW	(Scotland) SCO	Darren Mackie	23	3	8+11	1	0+2	0	2+0	2
11	MF	(Iceland) ISL	Kári Árnason	40	3	31+2	3	5+0	0	2+0	0
13	DF	(Scotland) SCO	Clark Robertson	12	0	9+0	0	3+0	0	0+0	0
14	FW	(New Zealand) NZL	Rory Fallon	27	7	18+3	2	4+1	4	0+1	1
15	MF	(Scotland) SCO	Peter Pawlett	24	0	5+15	0	1+1	0	2+0	0
16	MF	(England) ENG	Isaac Osbourne	26	0	22+1	0	1+0	0	1+1	0
17	MF	(Scotland) SCO	Fraser Fyvie	34	2	27+1	1	4+1	1	1+0	0
18	FW	(Algeria) ALG	Mohamed Chalali	20	2	4+12	1	1+1	1	0+2	0
19	FW	(Scotland) SCO	Michael Paton	2	0	0+2	0	0+0	0	0+0	0
20	GK	(Colombia) COL	David González	15	0	14+0	0	0+0	0	1+0	0
20	MF	(Scotland) SCO	Stephen Hughes	8	0	3+2	0	3+0	0	0+0	0
21	FW	(Northern Ireland) NIR	Josh Magennis	27	1	13+10	1	0+2	0	2+0	0
22	MF	(Scotland) SCO	Ryan Jack	37	3	30+1	3	4+0	0	2+0	0
23	FW	(Scotland) SCO	Mitchel Megginson	20	1	7+9	0	2+2	1	0+0	0
24	DF	(Scotland) SCO	Nicky Low	2	0	0+2	0	0+0	0	0+0	0
27	DF	(Scotland) SCO	Russell Anderson (c)	6	0	4+2	0	0+0	0	0+0	0
28	MF	(Scotland) SCO	Gavin Rae	12	0	12+0	0	0+0	0	0+0	0
30	MF	(Scotland) SCO	Ryan Fraser	3	0	0+3	0	0+0	0	0+0	0
32	GK	(Wales) WAL	Jason Brown	26	0	20+0	0	5+0	0	1+0	0
33	MF	(Scotland) SCO	Jamie Masson	4	1	3+1	1	0+0	0	0+0	0
34	FW	(Nigeria) NGR	Danny Uchechi	2	0	0+1	0	0+1	0	0+0	0
41	MF	(Scotland) SCO	Cammy Smith	2	0	0+2	0	0+0	0	0+0	0
47	FW	(Scotland) SCO	Declan McManus	2	0	0+2	0	0+0	0	0+0	0

As of 12 May 2012

=== Disciplinary record ===
No.	Nat.	Pos.	Name	SPL		Scottish Cup		League Cup		Total	
No.	Nat.	Pos.	Name	Yellow card	Red card	Yellow card	Red card	Yellow card	Red card	Yellow card	Red card
22	(Scotland)	MF	Ryan Jack	2	2	0	0	0	0	2	2
11	(Iceland)	MF	Kári Árnason	7	0	1	0	0	0	8	0
17	(Scotland)	MF	Fraser Fyvie	5	1	0	0	0	0	5	1
3	(Scotland)	DF	Ricky Foster	4	0	0	0	0	0	4	0
5	(France)	DF	Youl Mawéné	5	0	1	0	0	0	6	0
14	(New Zealand)	FW	Rory Fallon	3	0	0	0	0	0	3	0
10	(Scotland)	FW	Darren Mackie	3	0	1	0	1	0	5	0
21	(Northern Ireland)	FW	Josh Magennis	5	0	0	0	0	0	5	0
15	(Scotland)	MF	Peter Pawlett	4	0	0	0	0	0	4	0
6	(Scotland)	DF	Andrew Considine	6	1	1	0	0	0	7	1
7	(Scotland)	MF	Chris Clark	2	0	0	0	1	0	3	0
16	(England)	MF	Isaac Osbourne	2	0	0	0	0	0	2	0
13	(Scotland)	DF	Clark Robertson	3	0	1	0	0	0	4	0
9	(England)	FW	Scott Vernon	2	0	0	0	0	0	2	0
2	(Northern Ireland)	DF	Rory McArdle	4	0	0	0	0	0	4	0
8	(England)	MF	Robert Milsom	1	0	0	0	0	0	1	0
3	(Scotland)	DF	Mark Reynolds	1	0	1	0	0	0	2	0
18	(Algeria)	FW	Mohamed Chalali	1	0	0	0	0	0	1	0
28	(Scotland)	MF	Gavin Rae	1	0	0	0	0	0	1	0
1	(Scotland)	GK	Jamie Langfield	1	0	0	0	0	0	1	0

As of 12 May 2012

=== Goal scorers ===
Rank	Player	SPL	SC	LC	Total
1.	(England) Scott Vernon	11	2	0	13
2.	(New Zealand) Rory Fallon	2	4	1	7
3.	(Scotland) Andrew Considine	3	1	0	4
4.	(Iceland) Kári Árnason	3	0	0	3
5.	(Scotland) Darren Mackie	1	0	2	3
6.	(Scotland) Ryan Jack	3	0	0	3
7.	(France) Youl Mawéné	2	0	0	2
8.	(Algeria) Mohamed Chalali	1	1	0	2
9.	(Scotland) Fraser Fyvie	1	1	0	2
10.	(Scotland) Jamie Masson	1	0	0	1
11.	(England) Robert Milsom	1	0	0	1
12.	(Northern Ireland) Rory McArdle	0	0	1	1
13.	(Scotland) Ricky Foster	1	0	0	1
14.	(Northern Ireland) Josh Magennis	1	0	0	1
15.	(Scotland) Mitchel Megginson	0	1	0	1
15.	(Scotland) Chris Clark	1	0	0	1

As of 12 May 2012

== Competitions ==
=== Overall ===
Competition	Started round	Current position / round	Final position / round	First match	Last match
Scottish Premier League	1	—	9	23 July	12 May
League Cup	2nd round	—	3rd round	23 August	20 September
Scottish Cup	4th round	—	Semi-finals	7 January	14 April

Source: Competitions

=== Scottish Premier League ===
==== League table ====
Pos	Team	Pld	W	D	L	GF	GA	GD	Pts
7	Kilmarnock	38	11	14	13	44	61	−17	47
8	St Mirren	38	9	16	13	39	51	−12	43
9	Aberdeen	38	9	14	15	36	44	−8	41
10	Inverness Caledonian Thistle	38	10	9	19	42	60	−18	39
11	Hibernian	38	8	9	21	40	67	−27	33

Source: SPFL Archive
Rules for classification: 1) points; 2) goal difference; 3) number of goals scored.

==== Results summary ====
Overall								Home						Away					
Pld	W	D	L	GF	GA	GD	Pts	W	D	L	GF	GA	GD	W	D	L	GF	GA	GD
38	9	14	15	36	44	−8	41	6	7	5	21	15	+6	3	7	10	15	29	−14

==== Results by round ====
Round	1	2	3	4	5	6	7	8	9	10	11	12	13	14	15	16	17	18	19	20	21	22	23	24	25	26	27	28	29	30	31	32	33	34	35	36	37	38
Ground	H	A	H	A	H	A	A	H	A	H	H	A	H	H	A	A	H	A	H	A	H	A	H	A	H	A	H	A	H	A	H	A	H	A	A	H	A	H
Result	D	L	L	L	W	L	D	D	L	W	W	L	L	L	D	L	D	W	W	L	D	W	D	D	W	D	D	D	D	L	L	L	W	W	L	L	D	D
Position	4	10	10	11	10	11	11	10	11	9	7	7	10	11	11	12	10	9	9	9	9	9	9	8	6	7	8	7	7	8	8	9	8	7	8	9	9	9

Source: BBC Sport
A = Away; H = Home; W = Win; D = Draw; L = Loss

==== Results by opponent ====
Team	Results				Points
Team	1	2	3	4	Points
Celtic	0–1	1–2	1–1		1
Dundee United	3–1	2–1	3–1		9
Dunfermline Athletic	4–0	3–3	1–0	0–3	7
Heart of Midlothian	0–3	0–0	0–3		1
Hibernian	0–0	1–0	0–0	1–2	5
Inverness Caledonian Thistle	2–0	1–2	0–1	2–0	6
Kilmarnock	2–2	0–2	0–0	1–1	3
Motherwell	0–1	1–2	0–1		0
Rangers	0–2	1–2	1–1		1
St Johnstone	0–0	2–1	0–0		5
St Mirren	0–1	2–2	1–1	0–0	3

Source: 2011–12 Scottish Premier League article

== Transfers ==
=== Players in ===
Dates	Player	From	Fee	Source
18 May 2011	(Scotland) Ricky Foster	(Scotland) Rangers	Loan Return	
18 May 2011	(Scotland) Mitchel Megginson	(Scotland) Brechin City	Loan Return	
3 June 2011	(France) Youl Mawéné	(Greece) Panserraikos	Free	
1 July 2011	(Colombia) David González	(England) Manchester City	Loan	
1 July 2011	(England) Isaac Osbourne	(England) Coventry City	Free	
1 July 2011	(Scotland) Chris Clark	(England) Plymouth Argyle	Free	
18 July 2011	(Iceland) Kári Árnason	(England) Plymouth Argyle	Free	
20 July 2011	(Wales) Jason Brown	(England) Blackburn Rovers	Free	
18 August 2011	(Algeria) Mohamed Chalali	(Greece) Panionios	Free	
14 September 2011	(New Zealand) Rory Fallon	(England) Plymouth Argyle	Free	
6 January 2012	(Scotland) Mark Reynolds	(England) Sheffield Wednesday	Loan	
17 January 2012	(Scotland) Russell Anderson	(England) Derby County	Free	
27 January 2012	(Scotland) Stephen Hughes	(Scotland) Motherwell	Free	
30 January 2012	(Scotland) Gavin Rae	(Scotland) Dundee	Free	
31 January 2012	(Nigeria) Danny Uchechi	(Nigeria) Dender	Free	

=== Players out ===
Dates	Player	To	Fee	Source
18 May 2011	(Scotland) Paul Hartley	(Scotland) Alloa Athletic	Released	
18 May 2011	(England) Nick Blackman	(England) Blackburn Rovers	Loan Return	
18 May 2011	(Montenegro) Nikola Vujadinović	(Italy) Udinese	Loan Return	
18 May 2011	(Scotland) Steven Smith	(England) Norwich City	Loan Return	
7 June 2011	(Scotland) Scott Bain	(Scotland) Alloa Athletic	Free	
29 June 2011	(Scotland) Chris Maguire	(England) Derby County	£400,000	
1 July 2011	(Scotland) Zander Diamond	(England) Oldham Athletic	Free	
1 July 2011	(Scotland) Derek Young	(Iceland) Grindavík	Free	
1 July 2011	(England) Mark Howard	(England) Blackpool	Free	
1 July 2011	(Scotland) David McNamee	(Scotland) Ross County	Free	
1 July 2011	(Nigeria) Sone Aluko	(Scotland) Rangers	Free	
1 July 2011	(England) Myles Anderson	(England) Blackburn Rovers	Free	
1 July 2011	(Scotland) Lewis Davidson	(Scotland) Peterhead	Free	
12 July 2011	(Scotland) Dominico Gibson	(Scotland) East Stirlingshire	Free	
28 July 2011	(Scotland) Stirling Smith	(Scotland) Alloa Athletic	Free	
19 August 2011	(Scotland) Scott Ross	(Scotland) Peterhead	Loan	
30 August 2011	(Republic of Ireland) Joe Shaughnessy	(Scotland) Forfar Athletic	Loan	
30 August 2011	(Scotland) Nicky Low	(Scotland) Forfar Athletic	Loan	
31 August 2011	(Scotland) Michael Paton	(England) Stockport County	Loan	
15 September 2011	(Scotland) Jordon Brown	(Scotland) Forfar Athletic	Loan	
29 November 2011	(Scotland) Jamie Langfield	(Scotland) Forfar Athletic	Loan	
6 January 2012	(Scotland) Richard Foster	(England) Bristol City	Undisclosed	
18 January 2012	(Scotland) Jack Grimmer	(England) Fulham	£200,000	

== See also ==
- List of Aberdeen F.C. seasons
