= 2012–13 Aberdeen F.C. season =

Aberdeen
2012–13 season
- Chairman: Stewart Milne
- Manager: Craig Brown (until 6 April); Derek McInnes (from 8 April)
- Stadium: Pittodrie Stadium
- Scottish Premier League: Eighth Place
- Scottish Cup: Fifth round, lost to Hibernian
- Scottish League Cup: Quarter-final, lost to St Mirren
- Top goalscorer: League: Niall McGinn (20); All: Niall McGinn (21)
- Highest home attendance: 18,083 vs Celtic, 17 November 2012
- Lowest home attendance: 6,061 vs Motherwell, 1 December 2012
- Average home league attendance: 9,615
| Home colours | Away colours |

The 2012–13 season was Aberdeen's 100th season in the top flight of Scottish football. Aberdeen competed in the Scottish Premier League, Scottish Cup and Scottish League Cup. They finished 8th in the Premier League, reached the fourth round of the League Cup and the fifth round of the Scottish Cup. A number of players all departed during the summer's pre-season. Kari Arnason, Rory McArdle, Youl Mawene and Mohamed Chalali all moved on to new clubs as free agents. Darren Mackie, Yoann Folly and Danny Uchechi were also released by the club. Aberdeen also sold youngster Fraser Fyvie to Premier League side Wigan Athletic for a fee in the region of £500,000.

Manager Craig Brown made four additions, bringing in wingers Jonny Hayes and Niall McGinn from rival SPL clubs, as well as adding experienced left-back Gary Naysmith to his squad. Mark Reynolds who returned to his parent club Sheffield Wednesday at the end of last season, was allowed to return to Pittodrie on a season long loan.

Craig Brown retired as manager in 2013, with Derek McInnes taking over for the final five games of the season.

== Results and fixtures ==
Win Draw Loss Postponed

=== Friendly matches ===
| 14 July 2012 Friendly | Arbroath | 1–5 | Aberdeen | Arbroath |
| 15:00 | Sibanda 89' (pen.) | AFC | Fallon 34'; Magennis 49'; Megginson 55'; Paton 60'; Vernon 90' (pen.) | Stadium: Gayfield Park; Attendance: 1,766; Referee: Somers |

| 17 July 2012 Friendly | Elgin City | 1–0 | Aberdeen | Elgin |
| 19:30 | Moore 8' (pen.) | AFC | | Stadium: Borough Briggs; Attendance: 1,486; Referee: Shaw |

| 21 July 2012 Friendly | VfB Alstatte | 0–12 | Aberdeen | Alstatte |
| 15:00 | | AFC | Fallon 11'; Jack 17'; Milsom 21' (pen.); Pawlett 38, 45'; Shaughnessy 40'; Rae 49, 76'; Vernon 54' (pen.), 55'; McGinn 83'; Megginson 90' (pen.) | Stadium: Stadion am Bahnhof; Attendance: 180 |

| 25 July 2012 Friendly | Werder Bremen | 1–0 | Aberdeen | Bremen |
| 18:00 | Elia 24' | Report | | Stadium: Weserstadion; Attendance: 8,500 |

| 28 July 2012 Friendly | FC St. Pauli | 1–1 | Aberdeen | Hamburg |
| 15:30 | Ebbers 63' | AFC | McGinn 71' | Stadium: Millerntor-Stadion; Attendance: 8.402 |

| 14 August 2012 Neil Simpson testimonial | Aberdeen | 2–1 | Manchester United | Aberdeen |
| 19:00 | Hayes 37'; Shaughnessy 70' | AFC | Anderson 80' | Stadium: Pittodrie; Attendance: 21,000; Referee: Clancy |

| 29 August 2012 Friendly | Viking FK | 0–2 | Aberdeen | Stavanger |
| 19:00 | | AFC | Smith 81'; Jordon Brown 85' | Stadium: Viking Stadion |

=== Scottish Premier League ===
| 4 August 2012 1 | Celtic | 1–0 | Aberdeen | Glasgow |
| 12:45 | Commons 79' | BBC Sport | Anderson (yellow card) 90+1' | Stadium: Celtic Park; Attendance: 48,251; Referee: Murray |

| 11 August 2012 2 | Aberdeen | 0–0 | Ross County | Aberdeen |
| 15:00 | Jack (yellow card) 22'; Vernon (yellow card) 74' | BBC Sport | Tokely (yellow card) 81'; McMenamin (yellow card) 90+2' | Stadium: Pittodrie; Attendance: 14,010; Referee: Norris |

| 18 August 2012 3 | St Johnstone | 1–2 | Aberdeen | Perth |
| 15:00 | Hasselbaink 83'; Anderson (yellow card) 5'; Cregg (yellow card) 89' | BBC Sport | Osbourne 16'; Hayes 47'; Vernon (yellow card) 8'; Considine (yellow card) 42'; Osbourne (yellow card) 59' | Stadium: McDiarmid Park; Attendance: 4,857; Referee: Beaton |

| 26 August 2012 4 | Aberdeen | 0–0 | Heart of Midlothian | Aberdeen |
| 15:00 | Considine (yellow card) 67' | BBC Sport | Taouil (yellow card) 40'; Zaliukas (yellow card) 43'; Novikovas (yellow card) 64'; McGowan (yellow card) 82'; Grainger (yellow card) 90' | Stadium: Pittodrie; Attendance: 11,971; Referee: Muir |

| 1 September 2012 5 | Aberdeen | 0–0 | St Mirren | Aberdeen |
| 15:00 | | BBC Sport | van Zanten (yellow card) 54'; Barron (yellow card) 73'; Goodwin (yellow card) 75' | Stadium: Pittodrie; Attendance: 9,288; Referee: Colvin |

| 15 September 2012 6 | Inverness Caledonian Thistle | 1–1 | Aberdeen | Inverness |
| 15:00 | Foran 67' (pen.); Doran (yellow card) 18'; Meekings (yellow card) 43'; Tudar Jones (red card) 54'; Foran (yellow card) 78' | BBC Sport | Smith 84'; Anderson (red card) 65'; Vernon (yellow card) 66'; Smith (yellow card) 84' | Stadium: Caledonian Stadium; Attendance: 4,499; Referee: Salmond |

| 23 September 2012 7 | Aberdeen | 3–3 | Motherwell | Aberdeen |
| 12:45 | Rae 6'; McGinn 84'; Magennis 90+3' | BBC Sport | Higdon 42'; Hutchinson 48'; Law 82'; Kerr (yellow card) 18'; Hutchinson (yellow card) 27'; Hammell (yellow card) 86' | Stadium: Pittodrie; Attendance: 8,577; Referee: Madden |

| 29 September 2012 8 | Aberdeen | 2–1 | Hibernian | Aberdeen |
| 12:00 | McGinn 4'; Rae 71' | BBC Sport | Doyle 33'; Maybury (yellow card) 12'; Cairney (yellow card) 63'; Hanlon (yellow card) 66' | Stadium: Pittodrie; Attendance: 8,282; Referee: Murray |

| 6 October 2012 9 | Kilmarnock | 1–3 | Aberdeen | Kilmarnock |
| 15:00 | O'Leary 3'; O'Leary (yellow card) 21'; Kelly (yellow card) 72'; Johnston (yellow card) 82' | BBC Report | Rae 46'; McGinn 55'; Vernon 90'; Hughes (yellow card) 43'; Jack (yellow card) 52'; Magennis (yellow card) 82' | Stadium: Rugby Park; Attendance: 5,540; Referee: Clancy |

| 20 October 2012 10 | Dundee United | 1–1 | Aberdeen | Dundee |
| 15:15 | Rankin 22' (yellow card) 27' | BBC Sport | McGinn 53'; Robertson (yellow card) 47'; Vernon (yellow card) 62'; Anderson (yellow card) 64'; Milsom (yellow card) 89' | Stadium: Tannadice Park; Attendance: 9,858; Referee: Brines |

| 27 October 2012 11 | Aberdeen | 2–0 | Dundee | Aberdeen |
| 15:00 | McGinn 14'; Hayes 74'; Hughes (yellow card) 63' | BBC Report | Irvine (yellow card) 25'; Davidson (yellow card) 35'; McBride (yellow card) 75' | Stadium: Pittodrie; Attendance: 10,425; Referee: Murray |

| 3 November 2012 12 | Ross County | 2–1 | Aberdeen | Dingwall |
| 15:00 | Reynolds 37' (o.g.); Ross 49'; Quinn (yellow card) 9'; Kettlewell (yellow card) 16'; Fitzpatrick (yellow card) 84'; McMenamin (yellow card) 91' | BBC Report | McGinn 77'; Rae (yellow card) 45' | Stadium: Victoria Park; Attendance: 6,064; Referee: Thomson |

| 10 November 2012 13 | St Mirren | 1–4 | Aberdeen | Paisley |
| 15:00 | Thompson 88'; McAusland (yellow card) 14' | BBC Report | Hayes 10'; McGinn 45'; Clark 86'; Reynolds 87'; Clark (yellow card) 15'; Magennis (yellow card) 44' | Stadium: St Mirren Park; Attendance: 4,486; Referee: Finnie |

| 17 November 2012 14 | Aberdeen | 0–2 | Celtic | Aberdeen |
| 12:00 | | BBC Sport | Nouioui 73'; Mulgrew 77' | Stadium: Pittodrie; Attendance: 18,083; Referee: Thomson |

| 24 November 2012 15 | Hibernian | 0–1 | Aberdeen | Edinburgh |
| 15:00 | | BBC Sport | McGinn 77' | Stadium: Easter Road; Attendance: 12,007; Referee: Madden |

| 27 November 2012 16 | Aberdeen | 2–3 | Inverness Caledonian Thistle | Aberdeen |
| 19:45 | Magennis 45', 50'; Clark (yellow card) 25'; Magennis (yellow card) 45'; Vernon (yellow card) 72' | BBC Sport | McKay 36', 82'; Warren 58'; Warren (yellow card) 42' | Stadium: Pittodrie; Attendance: 9,193; Referee: Muir |

| 8 December 2012 17 | Heart of Midlothian | 2–0 | Aberdeen | Edinburgh |
| 15:00 | Stevenson 31' (Pen.); Paterson 54' | BBC Report | Magennis (yellow card) 30'; Considine (yellow card) 45+1' | Stadium: Tynecastle Stadium; Attendance: 14,410; Referee: Norris |

| 15 December 2012 18 | Aberdeen | 0–2 | Kilmarnock | Aberdeen |
| 15:00 | Langfield (red card) 45'; Hayes (yellow card) 60'; Reynolds (yellow card) 90+2' | BBC Report | Kelly 45+2' (pen.), 86'; Sissoko (yellow card) 37'; Fowler (yellow card) 54'; Harkins (yellow card) 69' | Stadium: Pittodrie; Attendance: 8,790; Referee: Charleston |

| 22 December 2012 19 | Aberdeen | 2–0 | St Johnstone | Aberdeen |
| 15:00 | McGinn 63', 81' | BBC Report | | Stadium: Pittodrie; Attendance: 7,051; Referee: Finnie |

| 26 December 2012 20 | Motherwell | 4–1 | Aberdeen | Motherwell |
| 15:00 | Hateley 9'; Murphy 31', 45'; Higdon 55' (yellow card) 48' | BBC Report | Hayes 34'; Robertson (yellow card) 66' | Stadium: Fir Park; Attendance: 5,093; Referee: Thomson |

| 29 December 2012 21 | Dundee | 1–3 | Aberdeen | Dundee |
| 15:00 | Stewart 82' | BBC Report | McGinn 46', 69', 89'; Shaughnessy (yellow card) 35'; Rae (yellow card) 45+2'; Anderson (yellow card) 62' | Stadium: Dens Park; Attendance: 9,013; Referee: Colvin |

| 2 January 2013 22 | Aberdeen | 2–2 | Dundee United | Aberdeen |
| 15:00 | Vernon 11'; McGinn 53'; Hayes (yellow card) 60' | BBC Report | Gunning 20'; Langfield 34' (o.g.) | Stadium: Pittodrie; Attendance: 13,176; Referee: Muir |

| 19 January 2013 23 | Inverness Caledonian Thistle | 3–0 | Aberdeen | Inverness |
| 15:00 | Shinnie 53'; McKay 61', 78'; Meekings (yellow card) 84' | BBC Report | Rae (yellow card) 35'; Hayes (yellow card) 56'; Robertson (yellow card) 59'; Osbourne (yellow card) 68' | Stadium: Caledonian Stadium; Attendance: 4,734; Referee: Allan |

| 27 January 2013 24 | Aberdeen | 0–0 | Hibernian | Aberdeen |
| 12:30 | | BBC Report | | Stadium: Pittodrie; Attendance: 7,184; Referee: Thomson |

| 30 January 2013 25 | St Johnstone | 3–1 | Aberdeen | Perth |
| 19:30 | Tadé 33'; Vine 68', (yellow card) 55'; Mackay 70' | BBC Sport | McGinn 44'; Hughes (yellow card) 71'; Shaughnessy (yellow card) 90' | Stadium: McDiarmid Park; Attendance: 2,167; Referee: McLean |

| 9 February 2013 26 | Aberdeen | 0–0 | St Mirren | Aberdeen |
| 15:00 | Reynolds (red card) 72' | BBC Report | | Stadium: Pittodrie; Attendance: 7,240; Referee: Beaton |

| 15 February 2013 27 | Aberdeen | 1–0 | Dundee | Aberdeen |
| 19:45 | McGinn 18' | BBC Sport | | Stadium: Pittodrie; Attendance: 7,841; Referee: Colvin |

| 23 February 2013 28 | Kilmarnock | 1–1 | Aberdeen | Kilmarnock |
| 15:00 | Heffernan 40' | BBC Sport | Fallon 7' | Stadium: Rugby Park; Attendance: 4,390; Referee: Norris |

| 26 February 2013 29 | Aberdeen | 0–1 | Ross County | Aberdeen |
| 19:45 | | BBC Sport | Glen 81' | Stadium: Pittodrie; Attendance: 6,394; Referee: Crawford |

| 9 March 2013 30 | Aberdeen | 0–0 | Motherwell | Aberdeen |
| 15:00 | | BBC Sport | | Stadium: Pittodrie; Attendance: 8,210; Referee: Clancy |

| 16 March 2013 31 | Celtic | 4–3 | Aberdeen | Glasgow |
| 15:00 | Commons 1'; Mulgrew 68'; Hooper 87'; Samaras 90+4' | BBC Sport | Vernon 45'; Magennis 53', 60' | Stadium: Celtic Park; Attendance: 46,395; Referee: McLean |

| 30 March 32 | Aberdeen | 2–0 | Heart of Midlothian | Aberdeen |
| 15:00 | McGinn 10', 55' | BBC Sport | | Stadium: Pittodrie; Attendance: 10,175; Referee: Collum |

| 6 April 2013 33 | Dundee United | 1–0 | Aberdeen | Dundee |
| 15:00 | Boulding 90' | BBC Sport | | Stadium: Tannadice; Attendance: 8,577; Referee: Thomson |

| 22 April 2013 34 | Hibernian | 0–0 | Aberdeen | Edinburgh |
| 19:45 | | BBC Sport | | Stadium: Easter Road; Attendance: 8,326; Referee: McLean |

| 27 April 2013 35 | Aberdeen | 1–0 | Kilmarnock | Aberdeen |
| 15:00 | McGinn 4' | BBC Sport | | Stadium: Pittodrie; Attendance: 6,334; Referee: Charleston |

| 5 May 2013 36 | Dundee | 1–1 | Aberdeen | Dundee |
| 15:00 | McAlister 20' | BBC Sport | McGinn 70' (pen.) | Stadium: Dens Park; Attendance: 6,441; Referee: Muir |

| 11 May 2013 37 | St Mirren | 0–0 | Aberdeen | Paisley |
| 15:00 | | BBC Sport | | Stadium: St Mirren Park; Attendance: 4,292; Referee: McKendrick |

| 18 May 2013 38 | Aberdeen | 1–1 | Heart of Midlothian | Aberdeen |
| 15:00 | Hamill 78' (o.g.) | BBC Sport | Ryan Stevenson 62' | Stadium: Pittodrie; Attendance: 10,465; Referee: Crawford |

=== Scottish League Cup ===
Aberdeen entered the Scottish League Cup in the second round stage, having not qualified for Europe in 2011–12. The draw for the second round took place at Hampden on 9 August and handed the Dons' an away tie against First Division side Greenock Morton

| 22 August 2012 2 | Greenock Morton | 0–2 (a.e.t.) | Aberdeen | Greenock |
| 19:45 | O'Brien (yellow card) 13'; McLaughlin (yellow card) 73'; Reid (yellow card) 84'; Tidser (yellow card) 114' | BBC Sport | Rae 109'; Vernon 115' | Stadium: Cappielow; Attendance: 2,817; Referee: Brines |

| 26 September 2012 3 | Dunfermline Athletic | 0–1 | Aberdeen | Dunfermline |
| 19:45 | | BBC Sport | Vernon 90+3'; Rae (yellow card) 36'; Robertson (yellow card) 65'; Hughes (yellow card) 88' | Stadium: East End Park; Attendance: 3,057; Referee: Beaton |

| 30 October 2012 4 | Aberdeen | 2–2 (a.e.t.) (2–4 p) | St Mirren | Aberdeen |
| 19:45 | Vernon 21'; Magennis 90+2' | BBC Sport | Parkin 6'; McLean 69'; Goodwin (yellow card) 71'; Dummett (yellow card) 97' van Zanten (yellow card) 115'; Guy (yellow card) 120' | Stadium: Pittodrie; Attendance: 7,610; Referee: Allan |
| | Penalties |
| | Hughes (penalty missed); McGinn (penalty scored); Hayes (penalty scored); Smith (penalty missed) | | McLean (penalty scored); Teale (penalty scored); Goodwin (penalty scored); McAusland (penalty scored) |

=== Scottish Cup ===
| 1 December 2012 4 | Aberdeen | 1–1 | Motherwell | Aberdeen |
| 15:00 | McGinn 90'; Shaughnessy (yellow card) 17' | BBC Sport | Murphy 80' | Stadium: Pittodrie Stadium; Attendance: 6,061; Referee: Collum |

| 11 December 2012 4 Replay | Motherwell | 1–2 | Aberdeen | Motherwell |
| 19:45 | Higdon 90+2' (pen.) | BBC Sport | Fallon 51'; Shaughnessy 61' | Stadium: Fir Park; Attendance: 4,516; Referee: Collum |

| 3 February 2013 5 | Hibernian | 1–0 | Aberdeen | Edinburgh |
| 15:30 | Deegan 48' | BBC Sport | | Stadium: Easter Road; Attendance: 11,877; Referee: Iain Brines |

== Statistics ==
=== Appearances and goals ===
| No. | Pos | Nat | Player | Total | | SPL | | Scottish Cup | | League Cup | |
| No. | Pos | Nat | Player | Apps | Goals | Apps | Goals | Apps | Goals | Apps | Goals |
|---|---|---|---|---|---|---|---|---|---|---|---|
| 1 | GK | (Scotland) SCO | Jamie Langfield | 43 | 0 | 37+0 | 0 | 3+0 | 0 | 3+0 | 0 |
| 2 | MF | (Scotland) SCO | Ryan Jack | 19 | 0 | 18+0 | 0 | 0+0 | 0 | 1+0 | 0 |
| 3 | DF | (Scotland) SCO | Clark Robertson | 27 | 0 | 21+2 | 0 | 2+0 | 0 | 2+0 | 0 |
| 4 | DF | (Scotland) SCO | Russell Anderson (c) | 35 | 0 | 30+1 | 0 | 2+0 | 0 | 1+1 | 0 |
| 5 | MF | (Scotland) SCO | Gavin Rae | 41 | 4 | 34+1 | 3 | 3+0 | 0 | 3+0 | 1 |
| 6 | DF | (Scotland) SCO | Andrew Considine | 22 | 0 | 17+1 | 0 | 2+0 | 0 | 2+0 | 0 |
| 7 | MF | (Scotland) SCO | Chris Clark | 12 | 1 | 6+4 | 1 | 0+0 | 0 | 1+1 | 0 |
| 8 | MF | (England) ENG | Robert Milsom | 14 | 0 | 3+10 | 0 | 1+0 | 0 | 0+0 | 0 |
| 9 | FW | (England) ENG | Scott Vernon | 41 | 6 | 29+6 | 3 | 2+1 | 0 | 2+1 | 3 |
| 10 | FW | (Northern Ireland) NIR | Niall McGinn | 40 | 21 | 33+2 | 20 | 3+0 | 1 | 2+0 | 0 |
| 11 | MF | (Republic of Ireland) IRL | Jonny Hayes | 41 | 3 | 29+6 | 3 | 3+0 | 0 | 3+0 | 0 |
| 13 | DF | (Scotland) SCO | Nicky Low | 5 | 0 | 1+4 | 0 | 0+0 | 0 | 0+0 | 0 |
| 14 | FW | (New Zealand) NZL | Rory Fallon | 16 | 2 | 8+6 | 1 | 2+0 | 1 | 0+0 | 0 |
| 15 | MF | (Scotland) SCO | Peter Pawlett | 14 | 0 | 4+8 | 0 | 0+1 | 0 | 0+1 | 0 |
| 16 | MF | (England) ENG | Isaac Osbourne | 27 | 1 | 21+2 | 1 | 1+0 | 0 | 3+0 | 0 |
| 17 | DF | (Scotland) SCO | Gary Naysmith | 10 | 0 | 7+1 | 0 | 0+0 | 0 | 1+1 | 0 |
| 18 | MF | (Scotland) SCO | Stephen Hughes | 27 | 0 | 22+1 | 0 | 1+0 | 0 | 2+1 | 0 |
| 19 | FW | (Scotland) SCO | Mitchel Megginson | 3 | 0 | 1+2 | 0 | 0+0 | 0 | 0+0 | 0 |
| 20 | MF | (Scotland) SCO | Ryan Fraser | 18 | 0 | 13+3 | 0 | 0+0 | 0 | 1+1 | 0 |
| 20 | GK | (Germany) GER | Dan Twardzik | 0 | 0 | 0+0 | 0 | 0+0 | 0 | 0+0 | 0 |
| 21 | FW | (Northern Ireland) NIR | Josh Magennis | 39 | 6 | 18+16 | 5 | 2+0 | 0 | 2+1 | 1 |
| 22 | DF | (Scotland) SCO | Mark Reynolds | 41 | 1 | 34+1 | 1 | 3+0 | 0 | 3+0 | 0 |
| 23 | DF | (Republic of Ireland) IRL | Joe Shaughnessy | 26 | 1 | 22+1 | 0 | 3+0 | 1 | 0+0 | 0 |
| 24 | MF | (Scotland) SCO | Jordon Brown | 2 | 0 | 0+2 | 0 | 0+0 | 0 | 0+0 | 0 |
| 25 | MF | (Scotland) SCO | Jamie Masson | 7 | 0 | 1+6 | 0 | 0+0 | 0 | 0+0 | 0 |
| 32 | GK | (Wales) WAL | Jason Brown | 2 | 0 | 1+1 | 0 | 0+0 | 0 | 0+0 | 0 |
| 34 | FW | (Scotland) SCO | Declan McManus | 7 | 0 | 0+7 | 0 | 0+0 | 0 | 0+0 | 0 |
| 35 | MF | (Scotland) SCO | Craig Murray | 1 | 0 | 0+1 | 0 | 0+0 | 0 | 0+0 | 0 |
| 38 | FW | (Scotland) SCO | Cammy Smith | 21 | 1 | 7+11 | 1 | 0+1 | 0 | 1+1 | 0 |
| 39 | MF | (Scotland) SCO | Craig Storie | 1 | 0 | 1+0 | 0 | 0+0 | 0 | 0+0 | 0 |

As of 18 May 2013

=== Disciplinary record ===
| No. | Nat. | Pos. | Name | SPL | | Scottish Cup | | League Cup | | Total | |
| No. | Nat. | Pos. | Name | Booked | Sent off (straight red) | Booked | Sent off (straight red) | Booked | Sent off (straight red) | Booked | Sent off (straight red) |
| 4 | (Scotland) | DF | Russell Anderson | 5 | 1 | 0 | 0 | 0 | 0 | 3 | 1 |
| 2 | (Scotland) | DF | Ryan Jack | 2 | 0 | 0 | 0 | 0 | 0 | 2 | 0 |
| 9 | (England) | FW | Scott Vernon | 4 | 0 | 0 | 0 | 0 | 0 | 4 | 0 |
| 6 | (Scotland) | DF | Andrew Considine | 3 | 0 | 0 | 0 | 0 | 0 | 3 | 0 |
| 16 | (England) | MF | Isaac Osbourne | 3 | 0 | 0 | 0 | 0 | 0 | 3 | 0 |
| 38 | (Scotland) | FW | Cammy Smith | 0 | 0 | 0 | 0 | 0 | 0 | 0 | 0 |
| 5 | (Scotland) | MF | Gavin Rae | 4 | 0 | 0 | 0 | 1 | 0 | 5 | 0 |
| 3 | (Scotland) | DF | Clark Robertson | 3 | 0 | 0 | 0 | 1 | 0 | 4 | 0 |
| 18 | (Scotland) | MF | Stephen Hughes | 4 | 0 | 0 | 0 | 1 | 0 | 5 | 0 |
| 21 | (Northern Ireland) | FW | Josh Magennis | 5 | 0 | 0 | 0 | 0 | 0 | 5 | 0 |
| 8 | (England) | MF | Robert Milsom | 3 | 0 | 0 | 0 | 0 | 0 | 3 | 0 |
| 7 | (Scotland) | MF | Chris Clark | 2 | 0 | 0 | 0 | 0 | 0 | 2 | 0 |
| 23 | (Republic of Ireland) | DF | Joe Shaughnessy | 4 | 0 | 1 | 0 | 0 | 0 | 5 | 0 |
| 1 | (Scotland) | GK | Jamie Langfield | 0 | 1 | 0 | 0 | 0 | 0 | 0 | 1 |
| 11 | (Republic of Ireland) | MF | Jonny Hayes | 3 | 0 | 0 | 0 | 0 | 0 | 3 | 0 |
| 22 | (Scotland) | DF | Mark Reynolds | 3 | 1 | 0 | 0 | 0 | 0 | 3 | 1 |
| 15 | (Scotland) | MF | Peter Pawlett | 2 | 0 | 0 | 0 | 0 | 0 | 2 | 0 |
| 10 | (Northern Ireland) | FW | Niall McGinn | 4 | 0 | 0 | 0 | 0 | 0 | 4 | 0 |

As of 18 May 2013

=== Goalscorers ===
| Rank | Player | SPL | SC | LC | Total |
|---|---|---|---|---|---|
| 1. | (Northern Ireland) Niall McGinn | 20 | 1 | 0 | 21 |
| 2. | (Northern Ireland) Josh Magennis | 5 | 0 | 1 | 6 |
| 2. | (England) Scott Vernon | 3 | 0 | 3 | 6 |
| 4. | (Republic of Ireland) Jonny Hayes | 4 | 0 | 0 | 4 |
| 4. | (Scotland) Gavin Rae | 3 | 0 | 1 | 4 |
| 6. | (New Zealand) Rory Fallon | 1 | 1 | 0 | 2 |
| 7. | (England) Isaac Osbourne | 1 | 0 | 0 | 1 |
| 7. | (Scotland) Cammy Smith | 1 | 0 | 0 | 1 |
| 7. | (Scotland) Chris Clark | 1 | 0 | 0 | 1 |
| 7. | (Scotland) Mark Reynolds | 1 | 0 | 0 | 1 |
| 7. | (Republic of Ireland) Joe Shaughnessy | 0 | 1 | 0 | 1 |

As of 18 May 2013

=== Clean Sheets ===
| Place | Position | Nationality | Number | Name | SPL | Scottish Cup | League Cup | Total |
|---|---|---|---|---|---|---|---|---|
| 1 | GK | (Scotland) | 1 | Jamie Langfield | 14 | 0 | 2 | 16 |
| 2 | GK | (Wales) | 32 | Jason Brown | 1 | 0 | 0 | 1 |
| | | | | TOTALS | 7 | 0 | 2 | 9 |

Last updated: 11 May 2013
Source: Match reports in Results

=== Home attendances ===
Win Draw Loss

| Comp | Date | Score | Opponent | Attendance |
|---|---|---|---|---|
| SPL | 11 August 2012 | 0–0 | Ross County | 14,010 |
| SPL | 26 August 2012 | 0–0 | Hearts | 11,971 |
| SPL | 1 September 2012 | 0–0 | St Mirren | 9,288 |
| SPL | 23 September 2012 | 3–3 | Motherwell | 8,577 |
| SPL | 29 September 2012 | 2–1 | Hibernian | 8,282 |
| SPL | 27 October 2012 | 2–0 | Dundee | 10,425 |
| Scottish League Cup | 30 October 2012 | 2–2 (2–4 pens) | St Mirren | 7,610 |
| SPL | 17 November 2012 | 0–2 | Celtic | 18,083 |
| SPL | 27 November 2012 | 2–3 | Inverness Caledonian Thistle | 9,193 |
| Scottish Cup | 1 December 2012 | 1–1 | Motherwell | 6,061 |
| SPL | 15 December 2012 | 0–2 | Kilmarnock | 8,790 |
| SPL | 22 December 2012 | 2–0 | St Johnstone | 7,051 |
| SPL | 2 January 2013 | 2–2 | Dundee United | 13,176 |
| SPL | 27 January 2013 | 0–0 | Hibernian | 7,184 |
| SPL | 9 February 2013 | 0–0 | St Mirren | 7,240 |
| SPL | 15 February 2013 | 1–0 | Dundee | 7,841 |
| SPL | 26 February 2013 | 0–1 | Ross County | 6,394 |
| SPL | 9 March 2013 | 0–0 | Motherwell | 8,210 |
| SPL | 30 March 2013 | 2–0 | Hearts | 10,175 |
| SPL | 27 April 2013 | 1–0 | Kilmarnock | 6,334 |
| SPL | 18 May 2013 | 1–1 | Hearts | 10,465 |
| | | | Total attendance | 196,360 |
| | | | Total league attendance | 182,689 |
| | | | Average attendance | 9,350 |
| | | | Average league attendance | 9,615 |

Last updated: 18 May 2013
Source: Match reports in Results

== Competition statistics ==
=== Overall ===
| Competition | Started round | Current position / round | Final position / round | First match | Last match |
|---|---|---|---|---|---|
| Scottish Premier League | 1 | — | 8 | 4 August | 18 May |
| League Cup | 2nd Round | Quarter-finals | Quarter-finals | 22 August | 30 October |
| Scottish Cup | 4th Round | 5th Round | | 1 December | |

Source: Competitions

=== Scottish Premier League ===
==== League table ====
| Pos | Team | Pld | W | D | L | GF | GA | GD | Pts | Qualification or relegation |
|---|---|---|---|---|---|---|---|---|---|---|
| 6 | Dundee United | 38 | 11 | 14 | 13 | 51 | 62 | −11 | 47 (Note: Teams in the bottom half at the time of the split may not overtake a team in the top 6 at the time of the split.) | |
| 7 | Hibernian | 38 | 13 | 12 | 13 | 49 | 52 | −3 | 51 | Qualification for the Europa League second qualifying round (Note: Since the winners of 2012–13 Scottish Cup, Celtic, qualified for European competition based on league position, the runners–up Hibernian secured a spot in Europa League second qualifying round.) |
| 8 | Aberdeen | 38 | 11 | 15 | 12 | 41 | 43 | −2 | 48 | |
| 9 | Kilmarnock | 38 | 11 | 12 | 15 | 52 | 53 | −1 | 45 | |
| 10 | Heart of Midlothian | 38 | 11 | 11 | 16 | 40 | 49 | −9 | 44 | |

Source: SPFL Archive
Rules for classification: 1) points; 2) goal difference; 3) number of goals scored.

==== Results summary ====
| Overall | | | | | | | | Home | | | | | | Away | | | | | |
| Pld | W | D | L | GF | GA | GD | Pts | W | D | L | GF | GA | GD | W | D | L | GF | GA | GD |
|---|---|---|---|---|---|---|---|---|---|---|---|---|---|---|---|---|---|---|---|
| 38 | 11 | 15 | 12 | 41 | 43 | −2 | 48 | 6 | 9 | 4 | 18 | 15 | +3 | 5 | 6 | 8 | 23 | 28 | −5 |

As of 18 May 2013

==== Results by round ====
| Round | 1 | 2 | 3 | 4 | 5 | 6 | 7 | 8 | 9 | 10 | 11 | 12 | 13 | 14 | 15 | 16 | 17 | 18 | 19 | 20 | 21 | 22 | 23 | 24 | 25 | 26 | 27 | 28 | 29 | 30 | 31 | 32 | 33 | 34 | 35 | 36 | 37 | 38 |
|---|---|---|---|---|---|---|---|---|---|---|---|---|---|---|---|---|---|---|---|---|---|---|---|---|---|---|---|---|---|---|---|---|---|---|---|---|---|---|
| Ground | A | H | A | H | H | A | H | H | A | A | H | A | A | H | A | H | A | H | H | A | A | H | A | H | A | H | H | A | H | H | A | H | A | A | H | A | A | H |
| Result | L | D | W | D | D | D | D | W | W | D | W | L | W | L | W | L | L | L | W | L | W | D | L | D | L | D | W | D | L | D | L | W | L | D | W | D | D | D |
| Position | 11 | 9 | 5 | 9 | 9 | 7 | 8 | 6 | 3 | 3 | 3 | 4 | 3 | 3 | 2 | 4 | 5 | 7 | 4 | 5 | 5 | 5 | 5 | 5 | 6 | 7 | 5 | 8 | 8 | 9 | 9 | 7 | 8 | 8 | 7 | 7 | 7 | 8 |

Updated to match(es) played on 18 May 2013. Source: Statto.com
A = Away; H = Home; W = Win; D = Draw; L = Loss

==== Results by opponent ====
Last updated on 18 May 2013

| Team | Results | | | | Points |
| Team | 1 | 2 | 3 | 4 | Points |
|---|---|---|---|---|---|
| Celtic | 0–1 | 0–2 | 3–4 | | 0 |
| Dundee | 2–0 | 3–1 | 1–0 | 1–1 | 10 |
| Dundee United | 1–1 | 2–2 | 0–1 | | 2 |
| Heart of Midlothian | 0–0 | 0–2 | 2–0 | 1–1 | 5 |
| Hibernian | 2–1 | 1–0 | 0–0 | 0–0 | 8 |
| Inverness Caledonian Thistle | 1–1 | 2–3 | 0–3 | | 1 |
| Kilmarnock | 3–1 | 0–2 | 1–1 | 1–0 | 7 |
| Motherwell | 3–3 | 1–4 | 0–0 | | 2 |
| Ross County | 0–0 | 1–2 | 0–1 | | 1 |
| St Johnstone | 2–1 | 2–0 | 1–3 | | 6 |
| St Mirren | 0–0 | 4–1 | 0–0 | 0–0 | 6 |

Source: 2012–13 Scottish Premier League article

== Transfers ==
=== Players in ===
| Dates | Player | From | Fee | Source |
|---|---|---|---|---|
| 26 June 2012 | (Republic of Ireland) Jonny Hayes | (Scotland) Inverness Caledonian Thistle | Free | |
| 4 July 2012 | (Northern Ireland) Niall McGinn | (Scotland) Celtic | Free | |
| 1 August 2012 | (Scotland) Gary Naysmith | (England) Huddersfield Town | Free | |
| 9 August 2012 | (Scotland) Mark Reynolds | (England) Sheffield Wednesday | Loan | |
| 31 January 2013 | Mark Reynolds | (England) Sheffield Wednesday | Free | |
| 31 January 2013 | (Germany) Dan Twardzik | (Italy) Calcio Como | Free | |

==== Players out ====
| Dates | Player | To | Fee | Source |
|---|---|---|---|---|
| 1 July 2012 | (Scotland) Mark Reynolds | (England) Sheffield Wednesday | Loan return | |
| 1 July 2012 | (Northern Ireland) Rory McArdle | (England) Bradford City | Free | |
| 1 July 2012 | (Iceland) Kári Árnason | (England) Rotherham United | Free | |
| 1 July 2012 | (Scotland) Matthew Cooper | (Scotland) Inverness Caledonian Thistle | Free | |
| 1 July 2012 | (Scotland) Dean Carse | (England) Berwick Rangers | Free | |
| 16 July 2012 | (Scotland) Fraser Fyvie | (England) Wigan Athletic | Undisclosed | |
| 23 July 2012 | (Scotland) Michael Dunlop | (Scotland) Forfar Athletic | Free | |
| 27 July 2012 | (France) Youl Mawéné | (England) Fleetwood Town | Free | |
| 10 August 2012 | (Algeria) Mohamed Chalali | (Algeria) ES Sétif | Free | |
| 23 August 2012 | (Scotland) Peter Pawlett | (Scotland) St Johnstone | Loan | |
| 1 July 2012 | (Scotland) Darren Mackie | (United States) Phoenix | Free | |
| 1 July 2012 | (Togo) Yoann Folly | Retired | | |
| 1 July 2012 | (Nigeria) Danny Uchechi | (Sweden) Väsby United | Free | |
| 31 August 2012 | (Scotland) Michael Paton | | Released | |
| 3 October 2012 | (Scotland) Mitchel Megginson | (Scotland) Alloa Athletic | Loan | |
| 18 October 2012 | (Scotland) Nicky Low | (Scotland) Alloa Athletic | Loan | |
| 17 January 2013 | (Scotland) Mitchel Megginson | (Scotland) Alloa Athletic | Loan | |
| 23 January 2013 | (Scotland) Jordon Brown | (Scotland) Forfar Athletic | Loan | |
| 29 January 2013 | (Wales) Jason Brown | | Free | |
