= 2015–16 Aberdeen F.C. season =

Aberdeen
2015–16 season
- Chairman: Stewart Milne
- Manager: Derek McInnes
- Ground: Pittodrie Stadium
- Scottish Premiership: 2nd
- Scottish League Cup: Third round (lost to Hibernian)
- Scottish Cup: Fourth round (lost to Hearts)
- Europa League: Third qualifying round
- Top goalscorer: League: Adam Rooney (20); All: Adam Rooney (20)
- Highest home attendance: 20,385 vs Celtic, Premiership, 12 September 2015
- Lowest home attendance: 10,003 vs Ross County, Premiership, 15 May 2016
- Average home league attendance: 13,094
Home colours	Away colours

The 2015–16 season was Aberdeen's 103rd season in the top flight of Scottish football and the third in the Scottish Premiership. Aberdeen also competed in the League Cup and the Scottish Cup and the Europa League.

== Season summary ==
Aberdeen finished second in the season. Shay Logan, Jonny Hayes, Kenny McLean and Graeme Shinnie were named in PFA Scotland Team of the Year.

== Pre-season and friendlies ==
Win Draw Loss Postponed

24 June 2015 Friendly	Brechin City	2–8	Aberdeen	Brechin
19:30 BST	Jackson 33'; Thomson 66'	AFC	Jack 7'; Rooney 24', 27' (pen.), 49' (pen.); Pawlett 34'; Logan 43'; Hayes 78'; Michael Rose 87'	Stadium: Glebe Park; Attendance: 1,2069

28 June 2015 Friendly	St Johnstone	0–1	Aberdeen	Brechin
13:00 BST		AFC	Rooney 71' (pen.)	Stadium: Glebe Park; Attendance: 1,248; Referee: Andrew Dallas

12 July 2015 Friendly	Raith Rovers	0–2	Aberdeen	Kirkcaldy
13:00 BST		Report	Goodwillie 64'; Taylor 74'	Stadium: Stark's Park; Attendance: 1,357

26 July 2015 Friendly	Aberdeen	1–0	Brighton & Hove Albion	Aberdeen
15:00 BST	Rooney 75'	Report		Stadium: Pittodrie Stadium; Attendance: 3,513; Man of the Match: Jamie Langfield

8 September 2015 Friendly	Aberdeen	2–1	Viking FK	Aberdeen
19:30 BST	Scott Wright 62'; McLean 85'	Report	Bytyqi 3'	Stadium: Pittodrie Stadium; Attendance: 4,396

=== Scottish Premiership ===
==== Results ====
2 August 2015 1	Dundee United	0–1	Aberdeen	Tannadice Park
15:30		BBC	McLean 82'	Attendance: 10,706; Referee: Clancy

9 August 2015 2	Aberdeen	2–0	Kilmarnock	Pittodrie Stadium
15:00	Shinnie 37'; Rooney 56' (pen.)	BBC		Attendance: 11,305; Referee: McLean

15 August 2015 4	Motherwell	1–2	Aberdeen	Fir Park
15:00	Johnson 5'	BBC Report	McGinn 25'; Taylor 62'	Attendance: 5,437; Referee: Collum

22 August 2015 5	Aberdeen	2–0	Dundee	Pittodrie Stadium
15:00	Rooney 66', 90+4'	BBC Report	Harkins (yellow card) 90+4' (red card)	Attendance: 13,621; Referee: Madden

29 August 2015 6	Partick Thistle	0–2	Aberdeen	Firhill Stadium
15:00		BBC Report	Rooney 49'; McLean 58'	Attendance: 4,940; Referee: Finnie

12 September 2015 7	Aberdeen	2–1	Celtic	Pittodrie Stadium
12:30	Rooney 56' (pen.); Hayes (red card) 72'; Quinn 86'	BBC Report	Griffiths 35' (pen.)	Attendance: 20,385; Referee: Thomson

15 September 2015 3	Aberdeen	1–0	Hamilton Academical	Pittodrie Stadium
19:45	Rooney 23' (pen.)	BBC Report		Attendance: 13,246; Referee: Allan

20 September 2015 8	Heart Of Midlothian	1–3	Aberdeen	Tynecastle Stadium
14:15	Rossi 52'	BBC Report	Goodwillie 9', 45'; McGinn 23'	Attendance: 16,702; Referee: Madden

26 September 2015 9	Inverness Caledonian Thistle	2–1	Aberdeen	Caledonian Stadium
15:00	Storey 8'; Christie 29'	BBC Report	Taylor 35'	Attendance: 6,410; Referee: Beaton

3 October 2015 10	Aberdeen	1–5	St Johnstone	Pittodrie Stadium
15:00	Taylor 12'	BBC Report	Easton 5'; Shaughnessy 10'; Craig 30'; MacLean 47', 51'	Attendance: 13,405; Referee: Muir

16 October 2015 11	Ross County	2–0	Aberdeen	Victoria Park
19:45	Graham 36', 49'	BBC Report		Attendance: 5,543; Referee: Thomson

24 October 2015 12	Aberdeen	1–1	Motherwell	Pittodrie Stadium
15:00	Rooney 43'	BBC Report	McDonald 73'	Attendance: 12,389; Referee: Allan

31 October 2015 13	Celtic	3–1	Aberdeen	Celtic Park
12:30	Griffiths 44', 53' (pen.); Forrest 60'	BBC Report	Rooney 89'	Attendance: 48,161; Referee: Collum

7 November 2015 14	Aberdeen	2–0	Dundee United	Pittodrie Stadium
15:00	Rooney 52'; Hayes 73'	BBC Report		Attendance: 12,805; Referee: McLean

22 November 2015 15	Hamilton Academical	1–1	Aberdeen	New Douglas Park
12:30	Imrie 70'	BBC Report	McLean 4'	Attendance: 2,434; Referee: Collum

28 November 2015 16	Aberdeen	3–1	Ross County	Pittodrie Stadium
15:00	Rooney 51'; Hayes 53'; McGinn 80'	BBC Report	Curran 14'	Attendance: 10,843; Referee: Beaton

5 December 2015 17	Dundee	0–2	Aberdeen	Dens Park
12:30		BBC Report	McGinn 9'; Rooney 25'	Attendance: 6,327; Referee: Madden

12 December 2015 18	Aberdeen	1–0	Heart Of Midlothian	Pittodrie Stadium
12:30	Rooney 87' (pen.)	BBC Report		Attendance: 13,110; Referee: Thomson

19 December 2015 19	Kilmarnock	0–4	Aberdeen	Rugby Park
15:00		BBC Report	McGinn 9'; Rooney 35'; Hayes 46'; Logan 80'	Attendance: 3,928; Referee: McLean

26 December 2015 20	Aberdeen	2–2	Inverness Caledonian Thistle	Pittodrie Stadium
15:00	McGinn 73'; Rooney 90' (pen.)	BBC Report	Polworth 41'; Tansey 47' (pen.)	Attendance: 15,142; Referee: Collum

30 December 2015 21	Aberdeen	0–0	Partick Thistle	Pittodrie Stadium
19:45		Report		Attendance: 12,583; Referee: Clancy

17 January 2016 23	Ross County	2–3	Aberdeen	Victoria Park
12:15	McShane 27', 82'	BBC Report	Reynolds (yellow card) 26' (red card); Rooney 33' (pen.); Logan 36', 60'	Attendance: 4,107; Referee: Allan

22 January 2016 24	Aberdeen	1–0	Dundee	Pittodrie Stadium
19:45	Rooney 14'	BBC Report		Attendance: 11,805; Referee: Muir

3 February 2016 25	Aberdeen	2–1	Celtic	Pittodrie Stadium
19:45	Hayes 31'; Church 37'	BBC Report	Griffiths 90+3'	Attendance: 19,003; Referee: McLean

6 February 2016 22	St Johnstone	3–4	Aberdeen	McDiarmid Park
15:00	Wotherspoon 52'; Anderson 79'; Scobbie 89'	BBC Report	Rooney 5', 77'; Pawlett 20'; McGinn 71'	Attendance: 5,712; Referee: Robertson

15 February 2016 26	Inverness Caledonian Thistle	3–1	Aberdeen	Caledonian Stadium
19:45	Vigurs 18'; Tansey 51' (pen.); Tremarco 65'	BBC Report	Rooney 7'	Attendance: 4,544; Referee: Collum

27 February 2016 28	Aberdeen	1–1	St Johnstone	Pittodrie Stadium
15:00	Church 35'; Jack (yellow card) 41'; Sinnie (yellow card) 80'	Report	Brown (yellow card) 7'; Wotherspoon (yellow card) 17'; Swanson (yellow card) 41'; Fisher (yellow card) 63'; Craig 88' (pen.); Kane (yellow card) 90+3'	Attendance: 12,563; Referee: McLean

2 March 2016 29	Dundee United	0–1	Aberdeen	Tannadice Park
19:45		BBC Report	Church 29'	Attendance: 9,737; Referee: Madden

8 March 2016 27	Partick Thistle	1–2	Aberdeen	Firhill Stadium
19:45	Lawless 60'	BBC Report	Considine 74'; Church 76'	Attendance: 3,915; Referee: Muir

12 March 2016 30	Aberdeen	2–1	Kilmarnock	Pittodrie Stadium
15:00	Taylor 37'; Logan 71'	BBC Report	Magennis 47'	Attendance: 13,725; Referee: Anderson

19 March 2016 31	Motherwell	2–1	Aberdeen	Fir Park
15:00	Gomis (yellow card) 34'; Kennedy (yellow card) 44'; Leitch (yellow card) 51'; McDonald 73'; Moult 75'	BBC Report	McLean 44' (pen.); Robson (red card) 79'	Attendance: 6,251; Referee: Robertson

3 April 2016 32	Aberdeen	3–0	Hamilton Academical	Pittodrie Stadium
12:30	Church 5'; McGinn 15'; McLean 33'; Storie (yellow card) 90+2'	BBC Report	Agustien (yellow card) 24'; Imrie (yellow card) 46'; Crawford (yellow card) 87'	Attendance: 12,509; Referee: Clancy

8 April 2016 33	Heart Of Midlothian	2–1	Aberdeen	Tynecastle Stadium
19:45	Juanma 33', 61'; Kitchen (yellow card) 53'; Rossi (yellow card) 59'; Juanma (yellow card) 78'	BBC Report	Church 4'; Shinnie (yellow card) 12'; McLean (yellow card) 46'; Logan (yellow card) 79'	Attendance: 16,995; Referee: McLean

22 April 2016 34	St Johnstone	3–0	Aberdeen	McDiarmid Park
19:45	Wotherspoon 14'; MacLean 38'; Craig 55'	BBC Report	Hayes (yellow card) 65'; Shinnie (yellow card) 84'	Attendance: 3,990; Referee: Thomson

30 April 2016 35	Aberdeen	4–1	Motherwell	Pittodrie Stadium
15:00	McLean 4' (pen.); McGinn 26'; Rooney 54'; Hayes 78'	BBC Report	Cadden 64'; Lasley (red card) 88'	Attendance: 10,259; Referee: Madden

8 May 2016 36	Celtic	3–2	Aberdeen	Celtic Park
12:30	Roberts 7', 20'; Lustig 49'	BBC Report	McGinn 57'; Considine 64'	Attendance: 47,877; Referee: Madden

12 May 2016 37	Aberdeen	0–1	Hearts	Pittodrie Stadium
19:45	Jack (yellow card) 63'	BBC Report	Oshaniwa (yellow card) 24'; Dauda 64'	Attendance: 10,087; Referee: Dallas

15 May 2016 38	Aberdeen	0–4	Ross County	Pittodrie Stadium
12:30		BBC Report	Graham 23' (pen.); Gardyne (yellow card) 37'; Schalk 45'; Boyce 68'; Woods 78'	Attendance: 10,003; Referee: Collum

=== UEFA Europa League ===
Aberdeen qualified for the first preliminary round of the UEFA Europa League by finishing second in the 2014-15 Scottish Premiership.

==== Qualifying phase ====
2 July 2015 First qualifying round 1st leg	FK Shkëndija (North Macedonia)	1–1	Aberdeen	Skopje, Macedonia
20:05 CET	Kirovski 84'	BBC; UEFA	McGinn 79'	Stadium: Philip II Arena; Attendance: 8,004; Referee: Tolga Özkalfa (Turkey)

9 July 2015 First qualifying round 2nd leg	Aberdeen	0–0 (1–1 agg.)	(North Macedonia) FK Shkëndija	Aberdeen, Scotland
19:45		BBC; UEFA		Stadium: Pittodrie Stadium; Attendance: 14,112; Referee: Nikolaj Hänni (Switzerland)

16 July 2015 Second qualifying round 1st leg	Rijeka (Croatia)	0–3	Aberdeen	Rijeka, Croatia
19:45		BBC; UEFA	Considine 38'; Pawlett 52'; McLean 75'	Stadium: Stadion Kantrida; Attendance: 9,000; Referee: Amaury Delerue (France)

23 July 2015 Second qualifying round 2nd leg	Aberdeen	2–2 (5–2 agg.)	(Croatia) Rijeka	Aberdeen, Scotland
19:45	McGinn 64'; Hayes 72'	BBC; UEFA	Tomasov 58'; Kvržić 63'	Stadium: Pittodrie Stadium; Attendance: 15,803; Referee: Marco Guida (Italy)

30 July 2015 Third qualifying round 1st leg	Kairat (Kazakhstan)	2–1	Aberdeen	Almaty, Kazakhstan
15:45	Bakayev 13'; Islamkhan 22'	BBC; UEFA	McLean 69'	Stadium: Central Stadium; Attendance: 23,500; Referee: Tamás Bognár (Hungary)

6 August 2015 Third qualifying round 2nd leg	Aberdeen	1–1 (2–3 agg.)	(Kazakhstan) Kairat	Aberdeen, Scotland
19:45	McLean 84'	BBC; UEFA	Gohou 59'	Stadium: Pittodrie Stadium; Attendance: 20,317; Referee: Miroslav Zelinka (Czech Republic)

=== Scottish League Cup ===
23 September 2015 Third round	Hibernian	2–0	Aberdeen	Easter Road
19:45	Cummings 82'; Malonga 88'			Attendance: 11,092; Referee: McLean

=== Scottish Cup ===
9 January 2016 Fourth round	Heart of Midlothian	1–0	Aberdeen	Tynecastle Stadium
17:30	Paterson 3' (yellow card) 90'; Miguel Pallardó (yellow card) 17'; Igor Rossi Branco (yellow card) 43'; Öztürk (yellow card) 87'; Alexander (yellow card) 90'	Report	Reynolds (yellow card) 9'; Rooney (yellow card) 43'; Pawlett (yellow card) 90'	Attendance: 13,595; Referee: (Scotland) John Beaton

== Squad statistics ==
During the 2015–16 season, Aberdeen have used twenty-three different players in competitive games. The table below shows the number of appearances and goals scored by each player.

=== Appearances ===
No.	Pos	Nat	Player	Total		Premiership		Europa League		League Cup		Scottish Cup	
No.	Pos	Nat	Player	Apps	Goals	Apps	Goals	Apps	Goals	Apps	Goals	Apps	Goals
2	DF	(England) ENG	Shay Logan	45	4	35+2	4	6	0	1	0	1	0
3	DF	(Scotland) SCO	Graeme Shinnie	45	1	37+0	1	6	0	1	0	1	0
4	DF	(Scotland) SCO	Andrew Considine	40	3	26+6	2	6	1	1	0	1	0
5	DF	(Wales) WAL	Ash Taylor	45	4	36+1	4	6	0	1	0	1	0
6	DF	(Scotland) SCO	Mark Reynolds	24	0	19+3	0	1	0	0	0	1	0
7	MF	(Scotland) SCO	Kenny McLean	45	9	38+0	6	3+2	3	1	0	1	0
8	MF	(Republic of Ireland) IRL	Willo Flood	29	0	18+4	0	2+3	0	1	0	1	0
9	FW	(Republic of Ireland) IRL	Adam Rooney	35	20	22+5	20	2+4	0	1	0	1	0
10	MF	(Northern Ireland) NIR	Niall McGinn	43	12	32+3	10	6	2	1	0	1	0
11	MF	(Republic of Ireland) IRL	Jonny Hayes	42	6	35+0	5	6	1	0	0	1	0
14	FW	(Scotland) SCO	Cammy Smith	14	0	2+12	0	0	0	0	0	0	0
15	MF	(Scotland) SCO	Barry Robson	13	0	2+9	0	0+2	0	0	0	0	0
16	MF	(Scotland) SCO	Peter Pawlett	26	2	9+9	1	3+3	1	0+1	0	0+1	0
18	FW	(Wales) WAL	Simon Church	13	6	13+0	6	0	0	0	0	0	0
19	GK	(England) ENG	Adam Collin	3	0	3+0	0	0	0	0	0	0	0
20	GK	(England) ENG	Scott Brown	13	0	13+0	0	0	0	0	0	0	0
22	MF	(Scotland) SCO	Ryan Jack (c)	35	0	26+2	0	6	0	1	0	0	0
23	MF	(Scotland) SCO	Craig Storie	10	0	6+4	0	0	0	0	0	0	0
24	DF	(Scotland) SCO	Michael Rose	1	0	1+0	0	0	0	0	0	0	0
26	FW	(Scotland) SCO	Scott McKenna	3	0	2+1	0	0	0	0	0	0	0
27	FW	(Scotland) SCO	Scott Wright	4	0	1+3	0	0	0	0	0	0	0
29	DF	(Scotland) SCO	Daniel Harvie	2	0	0+2	0	0	0	0	0	0	0
30	GK	(Australia) AUS	Aaron Lennox	1	0	1+0	0	0	0	0	0	0	0
31	MF	(Scotland) SCO	Frank Ross	2	0	0+2	0	0	0	0	0	0	0
37	MF	(Scotland) SCO	Connor McLennan	1	0	0+1	0	0	0	0	0	0	0
41	FW	(England) ENG	Joe Nuttall	2	0	0+2	0	0	0	0	0	0	0
Players who left the club during the 2015–16 season
17	FW	(Scotland) SCO	David Goodwillie (on loan to Ross County F.C.)	25	2	7+10	2	4+2	0	1	0	0+1	0
18	DF	(Scotland) SCO	Paul Quinn (given free transfer)	18	1	9+4	1	3+2	0	0	0	0	0
19	GK	(Wales) WAL	Danny Ward (recalled by Liverpool F.C.)	29	0	21	0	6	0	1	0	1	0
21	DF	(Northern Ireland) NIR	Ryan McLaughlin (loan ended)	5	0	1+3	0	0	0	0+1	0	0	0
25	FW	(Scotland) SCO	Lawrence Shankland (on loan to St Mirren F.C.)	0	0	0	0	0	0	0	0	0	0
30	GK	(Republic of Ireland) IRL	Danny Rogers (on loan to Falkirk F.C.)	0	0	0	0	0	0	0	0	0	0
32	FW	(Antigua and Barbuda) ANT	Josh Parker (loan ended)	8	0	1+6	0	0	0	0+1	0	0	0

=== Goalscorers ===
Ranking	Nation	Number	Name	Scottish Premiership	Europa League	League Cup	Scottish Cup	Total
1	(Republic of Ireland)	9	Adam Rooney	20	0	0	0	20
2	(Northern Ireland)	10	Niall McGinn	10	2	0	0	12
3	(Scotland)	7	Kenny McLean	6	3	0	0	9
4	(Republic of Ireland)	11	Jonny Hayes	5	1	0	0	6
4	(Wales)	20	Simon Church	6	0	0	0	6
6	(England)	2	Shay Logan	4	0	0	0	4
6	(Wales)	5	Ash Taylor	4	0	0	0	4
8	(Scotland)	4	Andrew Considine	2	1	0	0	3
9	(Scotland)	16	Peter Pawlett	1	1	0	0	2
9	(Scotland)	17	David Goodwillie	2	0	0	0	2
11	(Scotland)	3	Graeme Shinnie	1	0	0	0	1
11	(Scotland)	18	Paul Quinn	1	0	0	0	1
TOTALS				62	8	0	0	70

=== Disciplinary record ===
Number	Nation	Position	Name	Premiership		Europa League		League Cup		Scottish Cup		Total	
Number	Nation	Position	Name	Yellow card	Red card	Yellow card	Red card	Yellow card	Red card	Yellow card	Red card	Yellow card	Red card
2	(England)	DF	Shay Logan	9	0	1	0	0	0	0	0	10	0
3	(Scotland)	DF	Graeme Shinnie	6	0	1	0	0	0	0	0	7	0
4	(Scotland)	DF	Andrew Considine	3	0	1	0	0	0	0	0	4	0
5	(Wales)	DF	Ash Taylor	6	0	1	0	0	0	0	0	7	0
6	(Scotland)	DF	Mark Reynolds	3	1	0	0	0	0	1	0	4	1
7	(Scotland)	MF	Kenny McLean	4	0	0	0	0	0	0	0	4	0
8	(Republic of Ireland)	MF	Willo Flood	3	0	0	0	0	0	0	0	3	0
9	(Republic of Ireland)	FW	Adam Rooney	0	0	0	0	0	0	1	0	1	0
11	(Scotland)	FW	Jonny Hayes	2	1	0	0	0	0	0	0	2	1
14	(Scotland)	FW	Cammy Smith	1	0	0	0	0	0	0	0	1	0
15	(Scotland)	MF	Barry Robson	0	1	0	0	0	0	0	0	0	1
16	(Scotland)	MF	Peter Pawlett	0	0	0	0	0	0	1	0	1	0
17	(Scotland)	FW	David Goodwillie	0	0	1	0	0	0	0	0	1	0
18	(Scotland)	DF	Paul Quinn	2	0	0	0	0	0	0	0	2	0
19	(Wales)	GK	Danny Ward	1	0	0	0	0	0	0	0	1	0
22	(Scotland)	MF	Ryan Jack	4	0	0	0	1	0	0	0	5	0
23	(Scotland)	MF	Craig Storie	2	0	0	0	0	0	0	0	2	0
30	(Australia)	GK	Aaron Lennox	1	0	0	0	0	0	0	0	1	0
			TOTALS	47	3	5	0	1	0	3	0	56	3

== Team statistics ==
=== Scottish Premiership ===
==== League table ====
Pos	Team	Pld	W	D	L	GF	GA	GD	Pts	Qualification or relegation (Note: Teams play each other three times (33 matches), before the league is split into two groups (the top six and the bottom six).)
1	Celtic (C)	38	26	8	4	93	31	+62	86	Qualification for the Champions League second qualifying round
2	Aberdeen	38	22	5	11	62	48	+14	71	Qualification for the Europa League first qualifying round
3	Heart of Midlothian	38	18	11	9	59	40	+19	65	Qualification for the Europa League first qualifying round
4	St Johnstone	38	16	8	14	58	55	+3	56	
5	Motherwell	38	15	5	18	47	63	−16	50	

Source: Scottish Premiership, Soccerway (first phase), Soccerway (second phase)
Rules for classification: 1) Points; 2) Goal difference; 3) Goals scored; 4) Play-off (only if deciding champion, UEFA competitions qualification and second stage group allocation).
(C) Champions

==== Results by round ====
Round	1	2	3	4	5	6	7	8	9	10	11	12	13	14	15	16	17	18	19	20	21	22	23	24	25	26	27	28	29	30	31	32	33	34	35	36	37	38
Ground	A	H	A	H	A	H	H	A	A	H	A	H	A	H	A	H	A	H	A	H	H	A	H	H	A	A	H	A	A	H	A	H	A	A	H	A	H	H
Result	W	W	W	W	W	W	W	W	L	L	L	D	L	W	D	W	W	W	W	D	D	W	W	W	W	L	D	W	W	W	L	W	L	L	W	L	L	L
Position	4	2	3	3	2	1	1	1	1	1	2	2	3	3	3	2	2	2	2	2	2	2	2	2	2	2	2	2	2	2	2	2	2	2	2	2	2	2

Source: BBC Sport
A = Away; H = Home; W = Win; D = Draw; L = Loss

==== Results summary ====
Overall								Home						Away					
Pld	W	D	L	GF	GA	GD	Pts	W	D	L	GF	GA	GD	W	D	L	GF	GA	GD
38	22	5	11	62	48	+14	71	12	4	3	30	19	+11	10	1	8	32	29	+3

Source: BBC Sport

=== Results by opponent ===
Aberdeen score first

Team	Results				Points
Team	1	2	3	4	Points
Celtic	2-1	1-3	2-1	2-3	6
Dundee	2-0	2-0	1-0	—N/a	9
Dundee United	1-0	2-0	1-0	—N/a	9
Hamilton Academical	1-0	1-1	3-0	—N/a	7
Heart of Midlothian	3-1	1-0	1-2	0-1	6
Inverness C.T.	1-2	2-2	1-3	—N/a	1
Kilmarnock	2-0	4-0	2-1	—N/a	9
Motherwell	2-1	1-1	1-2	4-1	7
Partick Thistle	2-0	0-0	2-1	—N/a	7
Ross County	0-2	3-1	3-2	0-4	6
St Johnstone	1-5	4-3	1-1	0-3	4

Source: 2015–16 Scottish Premier League Results Table

== Transfers ==
=== Players in ===
Dates	Position	Nationality	Player	From	Fee
10 June 2015	DF	(Scotland)	Graeme Shinnie	(Scotland) Inverness Caledonian Thistle	Free
11 June 2015	FW	(England)	Joe Nuttall	(England) Manchester City	Free
12 June 2015	DF	(Scotland)	Paul Quinn	(Scotland) Ross County	Free
25 January 2016	GK	(Australia)	Aaron Lennox	(England) Queens Park Rangers	Free

=== Players out ===
Dates	Position	Nationality	Player	To	Fee
1 June 2015	MF	(Scotland)	Nicky Low	(Scotland) Dundee	Free
1 June 2015	FW	(Scotland)	Declan McManus	(England) Fleetwood Town	Free
1 June 2015	DF	(Republic of Ireland)	Joe Shaughnessy	(Scotland) St Johnstone	Free
1 June 2015	DF	(Scotland)	Clark Robertson	(England) Blackpool	Free
1 June 2015	MF	(Scotland)	Craig Murray	(Scotland) East Fife	Free
1 June 2015	MF	(England)	Andrew Driver	(Netherlands) De Graafschap	Free
1 June 2015	MF	(Scotland)	Jamie Masson	(Scotland) Formartine United	Free
1 June 2015	DF	(Scotland)	Russell Anderson	Retired	N/A
11 August 2015	GK	(Scotland)	Jamie Langfield	(Scotland) St Mirren	Free
26 January 2016	DF	(Scotland)	Paul Quinn	(Scotland) Ross County	Free

=== Loans in ===
Date	Position	Nationality	Name	From	Fee
26 June 2015	GK	(Wales)	Danny Ward	(England) Liverpool	Loan
20 August 2015	FW	(Antigua and Barbuda)	Josh Parker	(Serbia) Red Star Belgrade	Loan
29 August 2015	DF	(Northern Ireland)	Ryan McLaughlin	(England) Liverpool	Loan
15 January 2016	GK	(England)	Adam Collin	(England) Rotherham United	Loan
1 February 2016	FW	(Wales)	Simon Church	(England) MK Dons	Loan

=== Loans out ===
Date	Position	Nationality	Name	To	Fee
26 June 2015	GK	(Republic of Ireland)	Danny Rogers	(Scotland) Falkirk	Loan
26 August 2015	FW	(Scotland)	Lawrence Shankland	(Scotland) St Mirren	Loan
1 February 2016	FW	(Scotland)	David Goodwillie	(Scotland) Ross County	Loan

== See also ==
- List of Aberdeen F.C. seasons
