= Jordon Brown =

Scottish footballer (born 1992)

Personal information
- Date of birth: 28 November 1992 (age 33)
- Place of birth: Aberdeen, Scotland
- Position: Midfielder

Team information
- Current team: Peterhead (co-manager)
- Number: 18

Youth career
- 2006–2010: Aberdeen

Senior career*
Years	Team	Apps	(Gls)
2010–2013	Aberdeen	2	(0)
2011	→ Forfar Athletic (loan)	4	(0)
2013	→ Forfar Athletic (loan)	19	(0)
2013–2018	Peterhead	158	(23)
2018–2020	Cove Rangers		
2020–	Peterhead	89	(5)

Managerial career
- 2023–: Peterhead (co-manager)
- * Club domestic league appearances and goals as of 4 May 2026

Jordon Brown (born 28 November 1992) is a Scottish professional footballer who manages Scottish League One club Peterhead.

== Playing career ==
Brown came through the youth system at Aberdeen and played for the club at under-17 and under-19 levels. He signed a professional full-time contract in June 2009. In January 2010, he scored one goal and set up another for the Aberdeen under-19s in a 4–0 friendly match win over the Málaga CF youth side in Spain. For the 2010–11 season, he was given squad number 41. He was an unused substitute in four SPL matches that season and played in the Aberdeenshire Cup, in which he scored against Aberdeen based Highland League club Cove Rangers in the quarter-finals on 19 August 2010.

In Aberdeen's first pre-season friendly in advance of the 2011–12 season, which was against Scottish Second Division side Brechin City on 30 June 2011, Jordon made an appearance as a 76th-minute substitute for trialist Patrick Bengondo in a 3–1 victory. He made substitute appearances for the first team in three other pre-season friendlies in July 2011; a 5–2 defeat to Bundesliga side Borussia Mönchengladbach, an 11–1 victory over Highland Football League neighbours Inverurie Locos and a 1–0 loss to La Liga team Villarreal.

For the 2011–12 season, Jordon was given squad number 26. On 15 September 2011, he went on loan to Forfar Athletic. He scored both goals for Forfar in his first game for the club, a 2–0 friendly win against Dundee on 22 September 2011. His Scottish Football League debut came when he was a second-half substitute in a 2–0 home defeat to Dumbarton on 24 September 2011. Jordon was unable to play any further matches in the 2011–12 season after suffering a cruciate ligament injury in the first minute of a match against Cowdenbeath on 22 October 2011.

He was given the squad number 24 for Aberdeen in the 2012–13 season. He made his Scottish Premier League debut for the club as a substitute in a 3–1 win at Kilmarnock on 6 October 2012. On 23 January 2013, he returned to Forfar Athletic on loan until the end of the season.

Jordon was released by Aberdeen at the end of the 2012–13 season and signed a deal with Peterhead. He scored 2 goals against his former side in a 3–2 friendly win.

In summer 2018, Brown signed for Highland League club Cove Rangers. In one of his first appearances, a friendly against Aberdeen to mark the opening of Cove's new stadium, he suffered a serious head injury and the match was abandoned.

Brown returned to Peterhead in December 2020.

== Coaching career ==
Brown became one of the caretaker managers of Peterhead in March 2023, working alongside Ryan Strachan. Brown and Strachan were appointed as the management team on a permanent basis a month later.

== Personal life ==
Brown's younger brother Jason is also a footballer, who played for Peterhead since 2017 having begun his career in the youth system at Inverness Caledonian Thistle.

== Career statistics ==
=== Player ===
As of match played 30 July 2018

Appearances and goals by club, season and competition
Club	Season	League			National Cup		League Cup		Other		Total	
Club	Season	Division	Apps	Goals	Apps	Goals	Apps	Goals	Apps	Goals	Apps	Goals
Aberdeen	2011–12	Premier League	0	0	0	0	0	0	0	0	0	0
Aberdeen	2012–13	Premier League	2	0	0	0	0	0	0	0	2	0
Aberdeen	Aberdeen total		2	0	0	0	0	0	0	0	2	0
Forfar Athletic (loan)	2011–12	Second Division	4	0	0	0	0	0	0	0	4	0
Forfar Athletic (loan)	2012–13	Second Division	15	0	1	0	0	0	2 (Note: Appearances in the First Division play-offs)	0	18	0
Forfar Athletic (loan)	Forfar total		19	0	1	0	0	0	2	0	22	0
Peterhead	2013–14	Scottish League Two	35	3	1	0	1	0	1 (Note: Appearances in the Scottish Challenge Cup)	1	38	4
Peterhead	2014–15	Scottish League One	28	5	1	0	1	0	2	0	32	5
Peterhead	2015–16	Scottish League One	32	7	1	0	1	0	7 (Note: Five appearances and two goals in the Scottish Challenge Cup; two appearances in the Championship play-offs)	2	41	9
Peterhead	2016–17	Scottish League One	33	4	1	0	4	1	4 (Note: One appearance and a goal in the Scottish Challenge Cup; three appearances and a goal in the League One play-offs)	2	42	7
Peterhead	2017–18	Scottish League Two	30	4	2	1	4	0	4 (Note: Four appearances in the League One play-offs)	0	40	5
Peterhead	Peterhead total		158	23	6	1	11	1	18	5	193	30
Career total			179	23	7	1	11	1	20	5	217	30

=== Managerial record ===
As of match played 14 November 2026

Team	From	To	Record				
Team	From	To	G	W	D	L	Win %
Peterhead (co-manager)	21 March 2023	Present	163	65	32	66	39.88
Total			163	65	32	66	39.88

- Initially caretaker and appointed permanently on 25 April 2023

== Honours ==
=== Player ===
Peterhead

- Scottish League Two: 2013–14

Cove Rangers

- Highland Football League: 2018–19

=== Manager ===
Peterhead

- Scottish League Two: 2024–25
