= Joe Shaughnessy =

Irish footballer (born 1992)

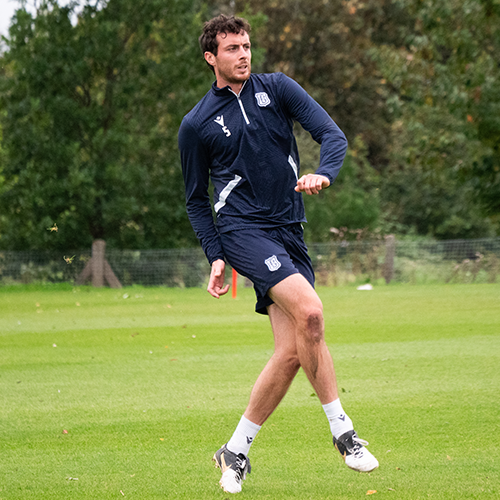
- Shaughnessy training with Dundee in 2023

Personal information
- Full name: Joseph Thomas Gordan Shaughnessy
- Date of birth: 6 July 1992 (age 34)
- Place of birth: Oughterard, County Galway, Ireland
- Height: 6 ft 0 in (1.83 m)
- Position: Centre-back

Team information
- Current team: Newcastle Jets
- Number: 5

Youth career
- Mervue United
- Salthill Devon

Senior career*
Years	Team	Apps	(Gls)
2009–2015	Aberdeen	53	(0)
2011–2012	→ Forfar Athletic (loan)	26	(3)
2014–2015	→ Falkirk (loan)	9	(0)
2015–2019	St Johnstone	146	(6)
2019–2020	Southend United	16	(0)
2020–2023	St Mirren	84	(5)
2023–2025	Dundee	44	(5)
2025–	Newcastle Jets	22	(1)

International career
2011	Republic of Ireland U19	4	(1)
2013–2014	Republic of Ireland U21	4	(0)
- * Club domestic league appearances and goals as of 16 May 2026

Joseph Thomas Gordon Shaughnessy (Irish English: [ˈʃɔːnəsi]; born 6 July 1992) is an Irish professional footballer who plays as a centre-back for Newcastle Jets in the A-League. Shaughnessy has previously played for Aberdeen, Forfar Athletic, Falkirk, St Johnstone, Southend United, St Mirren and Dundee. He has represented the Republic of Ireland national under-21 football team at international level.

== Early and personal life ==
His younger brother Conor is also a professional footballer with Championship side Portsmouth.

== Club career ==
=== Aberdeen ===
Shaughnessy signed for Aberdeen in June 2009, having previously played for Irish club Salthill Devon as a youngster. Shaughnessy made his debut on 14 May 2011 against Hibernian. A few days before making his debut, he signed a contract extension on a two-year deal.

On 30 August 2011, Shaughnessy went on loan to Forfar Athletic until January, along with Nicky Low. Shaughnessy made his debut for the club on 11 September 2011 in a 1–0 win against Brechin City. He then scored his first goal for the club, in a 4–2 win over Stirling Albion on 17 September 2011. Shaughnessy would score twice in two games; in a 4–3 loss against East Fife on 1 October 2011 and another in a 1–1 draw against Arbroath on 15 October 2011.

Ahead of the fourth round of the Scottish Cup, a tie against his parent club, manager Dick Campbell says he wouldn't put Shaughnessy and Low in the match against his parent club. Aberdeen won 4–0 and progressed to the next round. After impressing on loan, he went back to Forfar until the end of the 2011–12 season. He went on to make 26 appearances and scored three times.

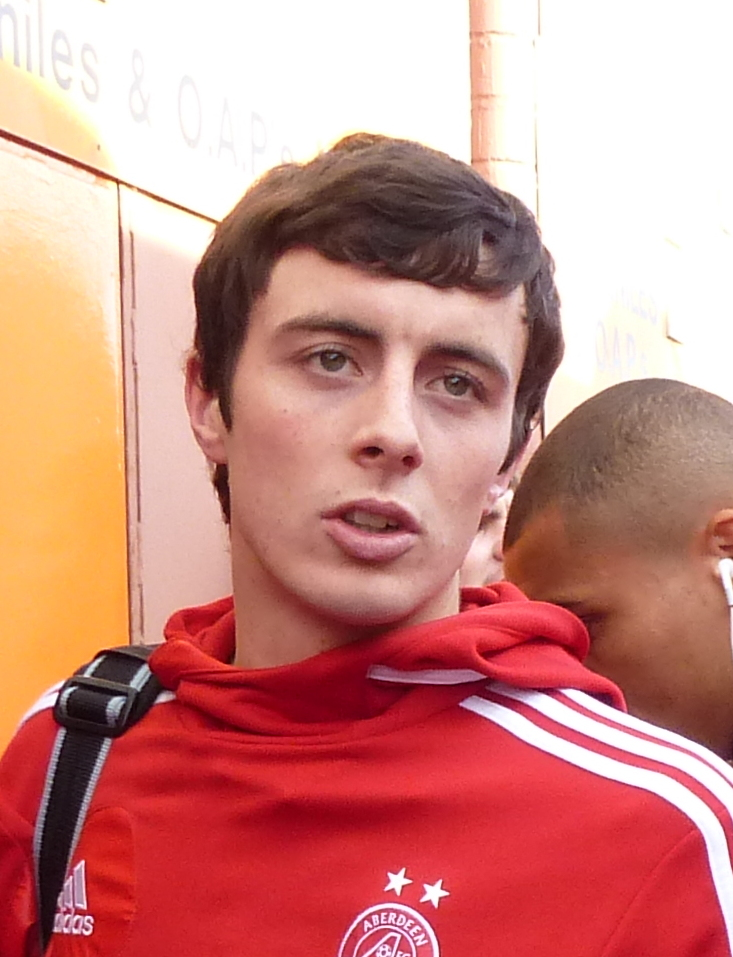
Shaughnessy with Aberdeen in 2012

Ahead of the 2012–13 season, manager Craig Brown believed Shaughnessy and Low had performed well at Forfar Athletic and considered him using them in the first team in the near future. In pre-season friendly matches, Shaughnessy scored twice in a 12–0 win over VfB Alstatte and a 2–1 win over Manchester United as part of Neil Simpson testimonial on 14 August 2012. On 7 December 2012, Shaughnessy signed a contract extension with Aberdeen until 2015. He scored his first competitive goal for Aberdeen four days later in the Scottish Cup Fourth Round Replay win over Motherwell.

In the 2013–14 season, Shaughnessy played in the right-back position at the start of the season. Shaughnessy was even compared to Richard Gough, due to his playing style. Shaughnessy scored his first goal of the season, in the third round of the Scottish League Cup, in a 5–0 win over Falkirk. He then received a red card in a 2–0 win over Motherwell on 30 October 2013. It was his first red card of his professional career and this resulted in him missing some matches. Shaughnessy subsequently had his first team opportunities limited, as Shaleum Logan or Ryan Jack were preferred in the right-back position.

Shaughnessy did not start a game for Aberdeen in the early part of the 2014–15 season and was loaned out to Falkirk. He made his debut on 6 September 2014, as Falkirk lost 1–0 against Stranraer in the Scottish Challenge Cup. After making nine appearances for the club, it was announced that Shaughnessy would return to his parent club on 3 January 2015. Following his return, Shaughnessy made two more appearances, including making his first start, in a 1–0 loss against St Johnstone in the last game of the season.

On 14 May 2015, Shaughnessy was named as one of seven players who would be leaving Aberdeen at the end of the season, having not been offered a new contract.

=== St Johnstone ===
Shaughnessy signed a pre-contract agreement with St Johnstone on 20 May 2015, agreeing a two-year deal. In October 2017, he was named as St Johnstone captain, replacing Steven Anderson in the role. He left St Johnstone at the end of the 2018–19 season.

=== Southend United ===
After a trial spell with Southend United, he subsequently signed a one-year deal with the Shrimpers on 1 August 2019. He made 21 appearances during one season with the club, which triggered an extension to his contract, but he was released by Southend on 2 July 2020.

=== St. Mirren ===
On 20 July 2020, Shaughnessy signed a two-year deal with St. Mirren. He was named vice-captain in October, before becoming the captain in January following the departure of Sam Foley. On 21 May 2021 Shaughnessy signed a contract extension with the club lasting until 2023.

=== Dundee ===
On 2 June 2023, Shaughnessy joined Scottish Premiership club Dundee. He was named as club captain by manager Tony Docherty in July. He would make his competitive debut in an away Scottish League Cup group stage win against Bonnyrigg Rose. Shaughnessy scored his first two goals for the club in quick succession on 28 October as he netted a late brace to clinch a win away to Livingston. It would not be his last time being the late hero for the Dee, with December seeing both a last-minute goal against Ross County to snatch all three points, and an equaliser away to Kilmarnock which salvaged a point. Having played in every minute of Dundee's impressive season in which they had achieved top six, Shaughnessy would suffer a "significant" knee injury early into a league draw at home to Rangers in mid-April 2024, which was confirmed a few days later to have ended his season following the announcement that the injury was a ruptured ACL.

As his injury was significant enough to rule him out for at least half of the following season, Shaughnessy began working more with the coaching staff. After making his return to the pitch in a reserve league match away to Kilmarnock, Shaughnessy returned to Dundee's named squad on 5 February 2025, as an unused substitute in the league away to Celtic. Three days later, Shaughnessy made his first competitive appearance for Dundee since April 2024 as a substitute in a Scottish Cup fifth round victory over Airdrieonians. On 7 March, a now regularly-starting Shaughnessy scored his first goal back from injury in a Scottish Cup match away to Heart of Midlothian. On 17 June 2025, Dundee announced that Shaughnessy had departed the club.

=== Newcastle Jets ===
On 9 July 2025, Shaughnessy signed a two-year deal with the Newcastle Jets in the A-League. On 4 October 2025, the Jets won the Australia Cup against Heidelberg United. Shaughnessy won the A-League Men Premier Plate in 2026 with Newcastle after topping the table.

== International career ==
In May 2010, he was called up to the Republic of Ireland Under-18 squad.

On 29 May 2011, Shaughnessy scored in his first cap for the Republic of Ireland Under-19s as they defeated Italy, securing qualification to the 2011 UEFA European Under-19 Championship. Shaughnessy would go on to feature heavily in the tournament, including starting as Ireland were eliminated in the semi-final by the tournament winners, Spain.

In January 2013, Shaughnessy was called up to the Republic of Ireland Under-21 squad.

== Career statistics ==
As of 16 May 2026

Appearances and goals by club, season and competition
Club	Season	League			National Cup		League Cup		Other		Total	
Club	Season	Division	Apps	Goals	Apps	Goals	Apps	Goals	Apps	Goals	Apps	Goals
Aberdeen	2009–10	Scottish Premier League	0	0	0	0	0	0	0	0	0	0
Aberdeen	2010–11	Scottish Premier League	1	0	0	0	0	0	—		1	0
Aberdeen	2011–12	Scottish Premier League	0	0	0	0	0	0	—		0	0
Aberdeen	2012–13	Scottish Premier League	23	0	3	1	0	0	—		26	1
Aberdeen	2013–14	Scottish Premiership	26	0	1	0	2	1	—		29	1
Aberdeen	2014–15	Scottish Premiership	3	0	0	0	0	0	0	0	3	0
Aberdeen	Total		53	0	4	1	2	1	0	0	59	2
Forfar Athletic (loan)	2011–12	Scottish Second Division	26	3	0	0	0	0	0	0	26	3
Falkirk (loan)	2014–15	Scottish Championship	9	0	0	0	1	0	1 (Note: Appearance in the Scottish Challenge Cup)	0	11	0
St Johnstone	2015–16	Scottish Premiership	37	1	1	0	3	1	2 (Note: Appearances in the UEFA Europa League)	0	43	2
St Johnstone	2016–17	Scottish Premiership	38	1	2	0	6	1	—		46	2
St Johnstone	2017–18	Scottish Premiership	38	1	2	0	1	0	2	1	43	2
St Johnstone	2018–19	Scottish Premiership	33	3	2	0	2	0	1 (Note: 1 appearance for St Johnstone U20 in the Scottish Challenge Cup)	0	38	3
St Johnstone	Total		146	6	7	0	12	2	5	1	170	9
Southend United	2019–20	League One	16	0	1	0	2	0	2 (Note: Appearances in the Football League Trophy)	0	21	0
St. Mirren	2020–21	Scottish Premiership	33	1	4	1	6	0	0	0	43	2
St. Mirren	2021–22	Scottish Premiership	36	3	3	0	3	1	0	0	42	4
St. Mirren	2022–23	Scottish Premiership	22	1	2	0	4	0	0	0	28	1
St. Mirren	Total		91	5	9	1	13	1	0	0	113	7
Dundee	2023–24	Scottish Premiership	33	4	1	0	4	0	0	0	38	4
Dundee	2024–25	Scottish Premiership	11	1	2	1	0	0	0	0	13	2
Dundee	Total		44	5	3	1	4	0	0	0	51	6
Newcastle Jets	2025–26	A-League Men	23	1	0	0	0	0	0	0	23	1
Career total			408	20	25	3	34	4	7	1	474	28

== Honours ==
Newcastle Jets

- Australia Cup: 2025
- A-League Men Premiers: 2025–26

Individual

- Scottish Premier League Young Player of the Month: December 2012.
