= Andrew Considine =

Scottish association football player

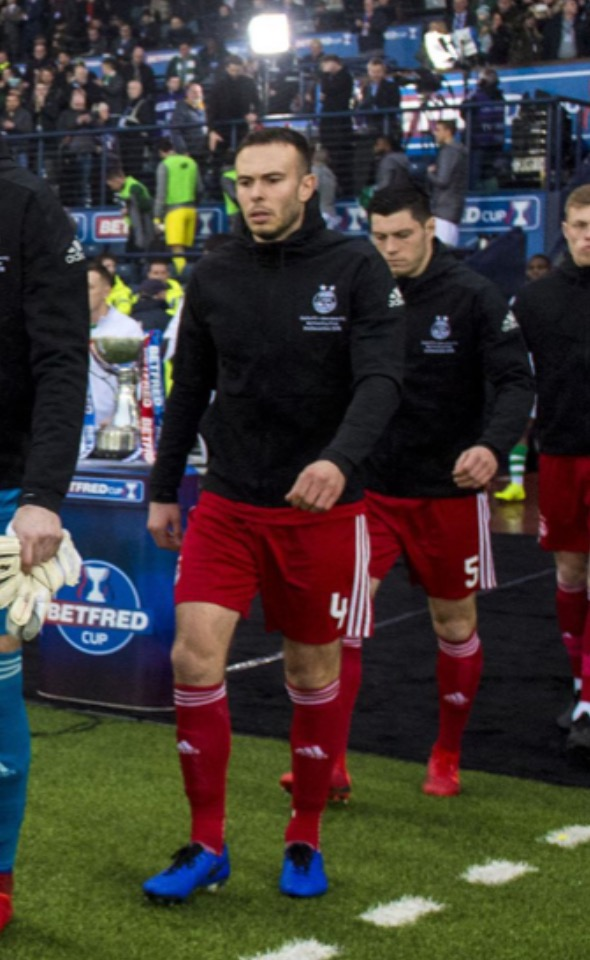
- Considine in 2018

Personal information
- Full name: Andrew MacLaren Considine
- Date of birth: 1 April 1987 (age 39)
- Place of birth: Banchory, Scotland
- Height: 6 ft 1 in (1.85 m)
- Position: Centre-back

Youth career
- 1999–2005: Aberdeen

Senior career*
Years	Team	Apps	(Gls)
2004–2022	Aberdeen	444	(29)
2022–2024	St Johnstone	61	(2)
Total		505	(31)

International career
2007	Scotland U20	2	(0)
2007–2008	Scotland U21	4	(0)
2020	Scotland	3	(0)
- * Club domestic league appearances and goals

Andrew MacLaren Considine (born 1 April 1987) is a Scottish former professional footballer who played as a centre-back. He played over 550 times for Aberdeen across 18 years, ranking among the players with most appearances in their history, and three times for the Scotland national team. Considine left Aberdeen after the 2021–22 season and signed for St Johnstone, where he played for a further two years.

== Club career ==
=== Aberdeen ===
Considine had the option of signing for Rangers as a youngster, but decided to sign for Aberdeen as he felt he had more chance of breaking into their first team. He made his professional debut in May 2004 in a 2–1 defeat to Dundee, making his second appearance at the end of the following season away at Celtic.

In 2005–06, Considine reached double figures in terms of appearances and became a first team regular in the 2006–07 season, playing in 36 matches and scoring his first goals for Aberdeen with a first half brace in a 2–0 victory at St Mirren in January 2007.

Considine started every league match for Aberdeen in the 2011–12 season and was the club's player of the year. He continued to play regularly in the 2012–13 season, but suffered a broken leg in a match against Dundee on 29 December.

On 29 December 2014, Considine signed a two-and-a-half-year extension to his contract, keeping him at Aberdeen until the summer of 2017. Considine was rewarded for his long service to Aberdeen with a testimonial match, played against Dutch club Twente on 27 March 2015.

Considine signed another contract extension on 14 February 2017, keeping him at Aberdeen until 2019. On 31 March 2017, he scored a hat-trick in a 7–0 win over Dundee at Dens Park. On 13 May 2018, he scored the only goal in a 1–0 win for Aberdeen against Celtic at Parkhead, which secured a 2nd place finish for Aberdeen in the 2017–18 Scottish Premiership.

In April 2019, he signed a two-year contract extension with the option of a further year. He made his 500th appearance for Aberdeen on 24 November 2019, in a league match at St Johnstone. His contract was extended to the end of the 2021–22 season in December 2020.

On 22 July 2021, Considine scored the opening goal in a 5–1 win over BK Häcken in a UEFA Europa Conference League qualifier. However, this transpired to be his final goal for the club as he missed most of the 2021–22 season after suffering a cruciate ligament injury in the early stages of a match against Qarabağ FK on 19 August.

He returned to fitness during the spring of 2022, but it was announced in April of that year that he would leave the club at the end of the season as a new contract could not be agreed.

On 15 May 2022, Considine made his final appearance for Aberdeen in a 0–0 draw against St Mirren. Selected as captain, he received a guard of honour and was substituted to an emotional standing ovation early in the second half.

=== St Johnstone ===
Considine signed for St Johnstone on 16 June 2022. On 28 August 2022, he headed his first goal for the club in a 3–2 defeat to Heart of Midlothian at Tynecastle.

In February 2024, he captained the side in successive games, with both Liam Gordon and Daniel Phillips absent due to injury.

On 28 May 2024, Considine announced he would leave the club upon the expiry of his contract. Two months later he confirmed his retirement as a player.

== International career ==
Considine played twice for the Scotland under-20 side, featuring at the 2007 Under-20 World Cup, and four times for Scotland under-21s.

Despite being a long-serving player at a high domestic club level with Aberdeen, Considine was not selected for the full Scotland national team for most of his career. He finally earned selection in October 2020, aged 33, after six players dropped out of the initial squad due to injuries and COVID-19.

On 11 October, he made his debut in a 1–0 victory against Slovakia, becoming the oldest Scotland debutant since 36-year-old goalkeeper Ronnie Simpson 53 years earlier. He then started successive November UEFA Nations League games against Czech Republic and Slovakia.

In March 2021, Considine was subsequently recalled for the opening 2022 World Cup qualifiers against Austria, Israel and Faroe Islands, however did not leave the bench.

== Personal life ==
Considine was born and raised in Banchory. He is the son of former Aberdeen defender Doug Considine.

Considine received attention in the media and online in 2015 when a humorous video of him dancing in drag with friends on his stag party, intended only for view by guests at his wedding, was released publicly. Five years later, the incident resurfaced when the song from the video ("Yes Sir, I Can Boogie" by Baccara) was chanted by the Scotland players, including Considine, in celebrations after qualifying for the UEFA Euro 2020 tournament and was adopted as one of the national team 'anthems' by supporters.

== Career statistics ==
=== Club ===
As of match played 19 May 2024

Appearances and goals by club, season and competition
Club	Season	League			National Cup		League Cup		Europe		Total	
Club	Season	Division	Apps	Goals	Apps	Goals	Apps	Goals	Apps	Goals	Apps	Goals
Aberdeen	2003–04	Scottish Premier League	1	0	0	0	0	0	0	0	1	0
Aberdeen	2004–05	Scottish Premier League	1	0	0	0	0	0	0	0	1	0
Aberdeen	2005–06	Scottish Premier League	12	0	1	0	1	0	0	0	14	0
Aberdeen	2006–07	Scottish Premier League	33	2	2	0	1	0	0	0	36	2
Aberdeen	2007–08	Scottish Premier League	22	0	5	2	3	2	7 (Note: Appearances in UEFA Cup)	0	37	4
Aberdeen	2008–09	Scottish Premier League	20	1	2	0	1	0	0	0	23	1
Aberdeen	2009–10	Scottish Premier League	16	1	0	0	1	0	2 (Note: Appearance(s) in UEFA Europa League)	0	19	1
Aberdeen	2010–11	Scottish Premier League	27	0	4	0	3	0	0	0	34	0
Aberdeen	2011–12	Scottish Premier League	36	3	4	1	2	0	0	0	42	4
Aberdeen	2012–13	Scottish Premier League	18	0	2	0	2	0	0	0	22	0
Aberdeen	2013–14	Scottish Premiership	21	0	4	1	3	1	0	0	28	2
Aberdeen	2014–15	Scottish Premiership	37	2	1	0	3	0	4	0	45	2
Aberdeen	2015–16	Scottish Premiership	32	2	1	0	1	0	6	1	40	3
Aberdeen	2016–17	Scottish Premiership	36	6	5	0	4	0	6	0	51	6
Aberdeen	2017–18	Scottish Premiership	32	4	4	0	2	0	4	0	42	4
Aberdeen	2018–19	Scottish Premiership	33	3	6	1	4	0	1	0	44	4
Aberdeen	2019–20	Scottish Premiership	27	4	5	1	2	1	6	0	40	6
Aberdeen	2020–21	Scottish Premiership	36	1	3	0	1	0	3	0	43	1
Aberdeen	2021–22	Scottish Premiership	4	0	0	0	0	0	5 (Note: Appearances in Europa Conference League)	1	9	1
Aberdeen	Total		444	29	49	6	34	4	44	2	571	41
St Johnstone	2022–23	Scottish Premiership	32	1	1	0	4	0	0	0	37	1
St Johnstone	2023–24	Scottish Premiership	29	1	1	0	4	0	0	0	34	1
St Johnstone	Total		61	2	2	0	8	0	0	0	71	2
Career total			505	31	51	6	42	4	44	2	642	43

=== International ===
As of match played 15 November 2020

Appearances and goals by national team and year
National team	Year	Apps	Goals
Scotland	2020	3	0
Total		3	0

== Honours ==
Aberdeen

- Scottish League Cup: 2013–14; runner-up: 2016–17, 2018–19
- Scottish Cup runner-up: 2016–17

== See also ==
- List of footballers in Scotland by number of league appearances (500+)
