= Ryan Jack =

Scottish footballer (born 1992)

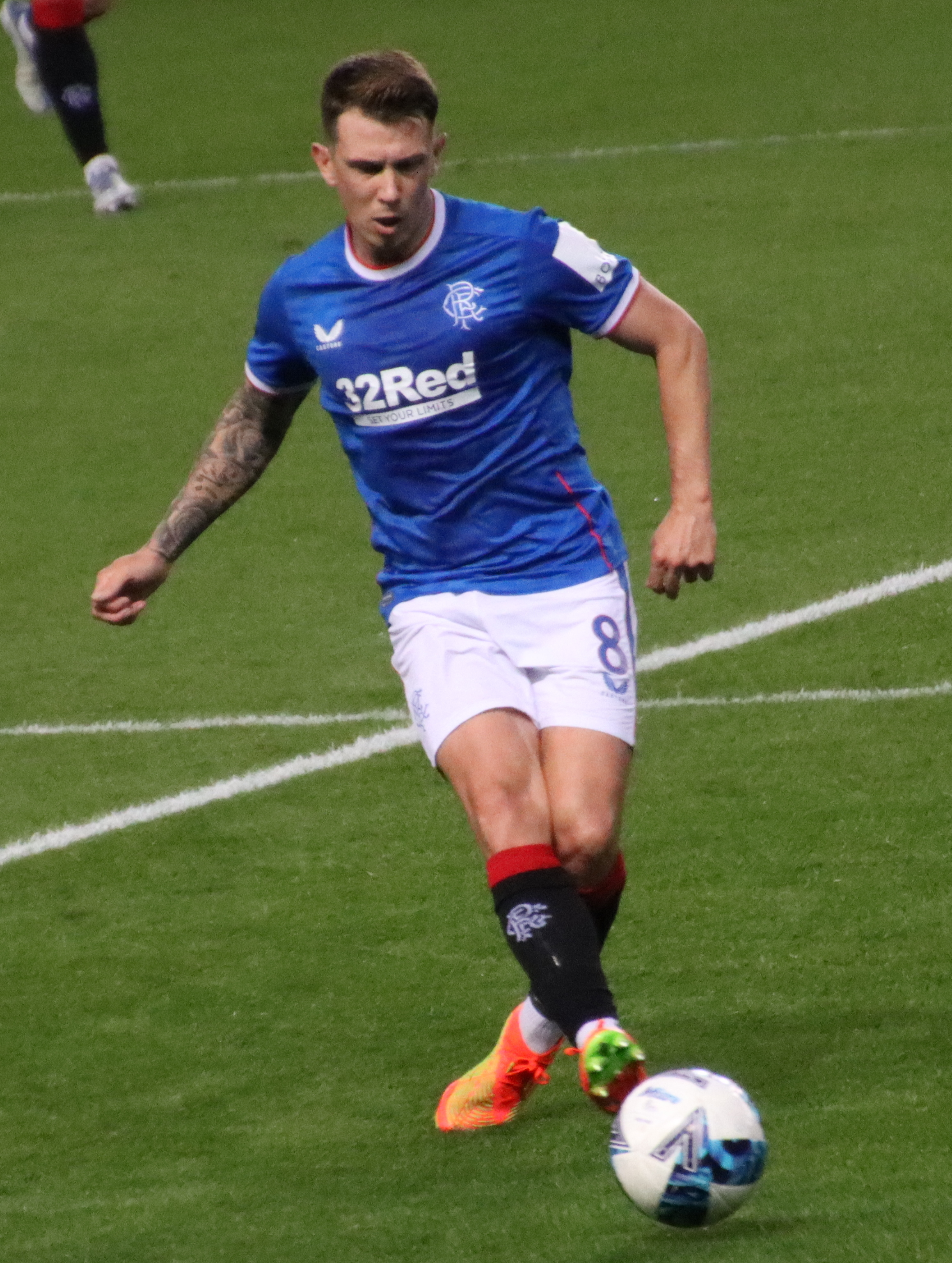
- Jack playing for Rangers in 2022

Personal information
- Full name: Ryan James Jack
- Date of birth: 27 February 1992 (age 34)
- Place of birth: Aberdeen, Scotland
- Height: 6 ft 0 in (1.82 m)
- Position: Defensive midfielder

Youth career
- 2000–2010: Aberdeen

Senior career*
| Years | Team | Apps | (Gls) |
| 2010–2017 | Aberdeen | 199 | (11) |
| 2017–2024 | Rangers | 131 | (12) |
| 2024–2026 | Esenler Erokspor | 54 | (4) |

International career
| 2007–2008 | Scotland U16 | 6 | (1) |
| 2008–2009 | Scotland U17 | 7 | (2) |
| 2009–2010 | Scotland U19 | 1 | (0) |
| 2011–2014 | Scotland U21 | 19 | (1) |
| 2017–2024 | Scotland | 20 | (0) |
- * Club domestic league appearances and goals as of 5 May 2026

Ryan James Jack (born 27 February 1992) is a Scottish professional footballer who plays as a Defensive Midfielder

Jack began his career at Aberdeen, spending 17 years connected with the club across youth and senior categories; he was in the team that won the 2013–14 Scottish League Cup, their first trophy since 1995, and served as captain for two years. He left Aberdeen in 2017 and signed for Rangers as a free agent. In seven years at Ibrox, he won one Scottish Premiership title and one Scottish Cup and played in the 2022 UEFA Europa League final. He departed the club in 2024 upon the expiry of his contract, joining Esenler Erokspor in September 2024.

Jack made his full international debut for the Scotland national team in November 2017.

== Early life ==
Ryan James Jack was born on 27 February 1992 in Aberdeen.

== Club career ==
=== Aberdeen ===
Jack signed professional terms with Aberdeen in the summer of 2008, having been part of his hometown club's youth academy since the age of eight. He made his first team league debut for the club against Rangers in September 2010 and soon became a regular in the first team.

In January 2011 he scored his first goal for Aberdeen against Inverness Caledonian Thistle, which was voted as the club's Goal of the Season for 2010–11. A week later, he came on as a substitute in the Scottish Cup semi-final at Hampden Park, a 4–1 defeat to Celtic.

Jack signed a new contract with Aberdeen in October 2011. On 13 December 2011 in a Scottish Premier League fixture against St Johnstone, he scored a goal from the halfway line to put his team 2–0 up after opposing goalkeeper Peter Enckelman miskicked a clearance. The match ended 2–1 to Aberdeen, with Jack's winner helping the Dons move up to ninth in the table.

In June 2013, Jack signed a three-year deal at Aberdeen, keeping him at the club until 2016. He subsequently played a pivotal role in Aberdeen's season, helping them into the League Cup semi-final, but was injured in January in a league match at Motherwell. and was ruled out for around six weeks, missing the semi-final with St Johnstone. He had returned by the time of the final of the competition, playing all 120 minutes as his club overcame Inverness CT in a penalty shoot-out. Jack did participate in a semi-final during the campaign in the Scottish Cup, again facing St Johnstone, but was on the losing side on that occasion.

On 11 January 2015, Jack was named as SPFL Player of the Month for December 2014. Two weeks later, he missed out on another League Cup final appearance as his team were beaten in the semis by Dundee United. On 20 May 2015, he signed a one-year extension to his contract, keeping him at Aberdeen until the end of the 2016–17 season. On 24 June 2015, Jack was named captain for the 2015–16 season.

After much speculation that he would move on, Jack left Aberdeen in May 2017 when his contract expired, having played 250 times for the Dons. His last game was the 2017 Scottish Cup Final; earlier in the season he had also led out the team in the League Cup final, with both showpiece matches lost to Celtic.

=== Rangers ===
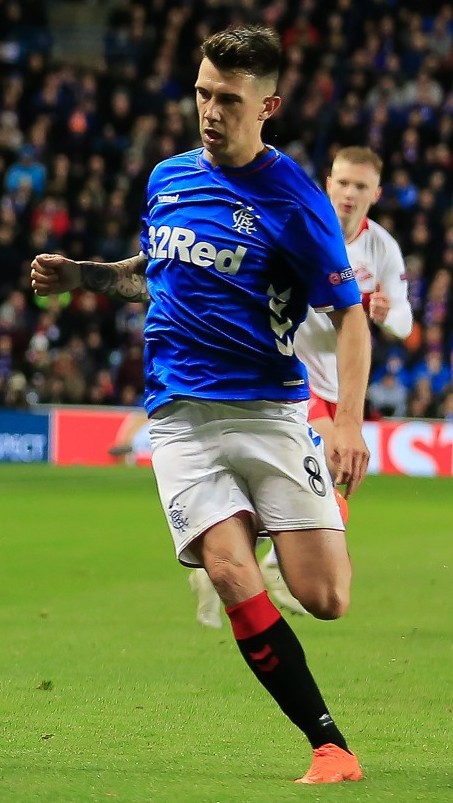
Jack playing for Rangers in 2018

Jack signed a three-year contract with Rangers on 1 June 2017. Upon signing, he said that he was a big Rangers fan growing up and that it was an "honour and a privilege" to join the club he supported. He made his debut against Luxembourgish side Progrès Niederkorn in the first qualifying round of the 2017–18 UEFA Europa League on 29 June 2017, a tie which Rangers lost 2–1 on aggregate after losing 2–0 away from home.

On Rangers' first visit to Aberdeen since his move, Jack started the game but was sent off in the second half for a bad tackle, although his team won the match 2–1. It was his fourth red card in the 2017–18 season (two were rescinded after reviews). In January 2018, Rangers confirmed that Jack required surgery on a knee injury sustained in a match the previous month, ruling him out of action for some time.

Jack signed a new contract with Rangers in December 2018, due to run until the end of the 2020–21 season. On 29 December, he scored his first Rangers goal in the Old Firm derby against Celtic, a match which Rangers won 1–0. In October 2019 he signed a new four-year contract with the club.

Jack helped Rangers win the 2020–21 Scottish Premiership, their first league championship since 2011. In the later part of the season he was troubled by a calf injury that required surgery, he eventually returning to the team in early November 2021. He scored the opening goal in the 2022 Scottish Cup final as Rangers overcame Hearts 2–0 after extra time, three days after losing the 2022 UEFA Europa League final to Eintracht Frankfurt in a penalty shootout.

Jack signed a one-year contract extension with Rangers in May 2023.

Jack missed the majority of the 2023–24 season through injury and was allowed to leave the club on a free transfer in June 2024.

=== Esenler Erokspor ===
In September 2024, Jack signed for Turkish side Esenler Erokspor.

As of July 2026 Ryan Jack is a Free Agent after his contract expired at Esenler Erokspor. He made 54 appearances for the club scoring 2 goals on his 2 year span.

== International career ==
Jack has represented Scotland at under-16, under-17, under-19 and under-21 level. He captained the under-21 side and is on the top ten list for appearances at this level. In May 2013, he received a call-up to the full Scotland squad for the game against Croatia.

Jack eventually made his full Scotland debut in a friendly against Netherlands in November 2017, by which time he had moved from formative club Aberdeen to Rangers. The match happened to take place in Aberdeen, and in the opening stages he was booed whenever he touched the ball by some of the crowd, due to the rivalry between those clubs and the ill-feeling his transfer had stirred; other fans responded to this by cheering and applauding him.

Jack made his first competitive start for Scotland in November 2019, forming a midfield partnership with Callum McGregor. He helped Scotland qualify for UEFA Euro 2020, but missed the finals due to a calf injury that required surgery.

In May 2024, Jack was selected for the 26-man Scotland squad for UEFA Euro 2024 despite taking part in few matches at club level in the months leading up to the tournament; he did not make an appearance in Germany as the team were eliminated at the group stage.

In August 2024, Jack was excluded from the Scotland side for Nations League matches with Portugal and Poland.

== Career statistics ==
=== Club ===
As of match played 7 March 2024

Appearances and goals by club, season and competition
| Club | Season | League | | | Scottish Cup | | League Cup | | Europe | | Total | |
| Club | Season | Division | Apps | Goals | Apps | Goals | Apps | Goals | Apps | Goals | Apps | Goals |
|---|---|---|---|---|---|---|---|---|---|---|---|---|
| Aberdeen | 2010–11 | Scottish Premier League | 30 | 1 | 4 | 0 | 3 | 0 | — | | 37 | 1 |
| Aberdeen | 2011–12 | Scottish Premier League | 31 | 3 | 4 | 0 | 2 | 0 | — | | 37 | 3 |
| Aberdeen | 2012–13 | Scottish Premier League | 18 | 0 | 0 | 0 | 1 | 0 | — | | 19 | 0 |
| Aberdeen | 2013–14 | Scottish Premiership | 34 | 2 | 3 | 0 | 4 | 0 | — | | 41 | 2 |
| Aberdeen | 2014–15 | Scottish Premiership | 32 | 3 | 1 | 0 | 3 | 0 | 6 (Note: Appearances in UEFA Europa League) | 0 | 42 | 3 |
| Aberdeen | 2015–16 | Scottish Premiership | 28 | 0 | 0 | 0 | 1 | 0 | 6 | 0 | 35 | 0 |
| Aberdeen | 2016–17 | Scottish Premiership | 26 | 2 | 4 | 0 | 3 | 0 | 6 | 0 | 39 | 2 |
| Aberdeen | Total | | 199 | 11 | 16 | 0 | 17 | 0 | 18 | 0 | 250 | 11 |
| Rangers | 2017–18 | Scottish Premiership | 17 | 0 | 0 | 0 | 2 | 0 | 2 | 0 | 21 | 0 |
| Rangers | 2018–19 | Scottish Premiership | 30 | 4 | 5 | 0 | 1 | 0 | 10 | 0 | 46 | 4 |
| Rangers | 2019–20 | Scottish Premiership | 19 | 4 | 2 | 0 | 3 | 0 | 15 | 1 | 39 | 5 |
| Rangers | 2020–21 | Scottish Premiership | 19 | 2 | 0 | 0 | 0 | 0 | 5 | 0 | 24 | 2 |
| Rangers | 2021–22 | Scottish Premiership | 9 | 0 | 3 | 1 | 1 | 0 | 9 | 0 | 22 | 1 |
| Rangers | 2022–23 | Scottish Premiership | 26 | 1 | 2 | 0 | 3 | 1 | 5 (Note: Appearances in UEFA Champions League) | 0 | 36 | 2 |
| Rangers | 2023–24 | Scottish Premiership | 11 | 1 | 2 | 0 | 2 | 1 | 7 (Note: Four appearances in UEFA Champions League, three appearances in UEFA Europa League) | 0 | 22 | 2 |
| Rangers | Total | | 131 | 12 | 14 | 1 | 12 | 2 | 53 | 1 | 210 | 16 |
| Career total | | | 330 | 23 | 30 | 1 | 29 | 2 | 71 | 1 | 460 | 27 |

=== International ===
Appearances and goals by national team and year
| National team | Year | Apps | Goals |
|---|---|---|---|
| Scotland | 2017 | 1 | 0 |
| Scotland | 2018 | 1 | 0 |
| Scotland | 2019 | 2 | 0 |
| Scotland | 2020 | 6 | 0 |
| Scotland | 2022 | 4 | 0 |
| Scotland | 2023 | 4 | 0 |
| Scotland | 2024 | 2 | 0 |
| Total | | 20 | 0 |

== Honours ==
Aberdeen

- Scottish League Cup: 2013–14; runner-up: 2016–17
- Scottish Cup runner-up: 2016–17

Rangers

- Scottish Premiership: 2020–21
- Scottish Cup: 2021–22; runner-up 2023–24
- Scottish League Cup runner-up: 2019–20, 2022–23
- UEFA Europa League runner-up: 2021–22

Individual

- SPFL Player of the Month: December 2014
