= Danny Uchechi =

Nigerian footballer

Personal information
- Full name: Chima Daniel Uchechi
- Date of birth: 14 September 1989 (age 37)
- Place of birth: Abia State, Nigeria
- Position: Forward

Team information
- Current team: Rayners Lane

Youth career
- 2003–2008: Charlton Athletic

Senior career*
Years	Team	Apps	(Gls)
2008–2009	Charlton Athletic	0	(0)
2009–2010	West Ham United	0	(0)
2010–2012	FC Dender		
2011	→ Leicester City (loan)	0	(0)
2011–2012	→ Sheffield Wednesday (loan)	1	(0)
2012	Aberdeen	1	(0)
2012–2014	AFC United	11	(1)
2014	Dalkurd FF	8	(0)
2016	BSV Hürtürkel		
2016–2017	Boreham Wood	9	(0)
2017–2018	Hendon	19	(1)
2018	Hampton & Richmond Borough	18	(0)
2018–2019	Cray Wanderers	11	(1)
2019	South Park	7	(2)
2019–2020	Hornchurch	22	(2)
2020	Burgess Hill Town	2	(0)
2020	East Grinstead Town	4	(0)
2021	Burgess Hill Town	6	(0)
2021–2022	Cray Wanderers	10	(0)
2022–2023	East Grinstead Town	34	(2)
2023–	Rayners Lane	14	(0)

International career
2009	Nigeria U-20	6	(1)
2008–2011	Nigeria U-23	5	(2)
- * Club domestic league appearances and goals as of 21:32, 19 August 2023 (UTC)

Chima Daniel Uchechi (born 14 September 1989) is a Nigerian football forward for Rayners Lane.

== Career ==
Uchechi was born in Abia State and moved to England in 2002. Uchechi scored 13 goals with the Charlton Athletic under-18 team, then added five goals in reserve squad matches in 2008–09 season. Uchechi signed for West Ham United in spring 2009. After being released by West Ham, Uchechi returned in summer 2010 to Nigeria National League side FC Dender.

=== Loan to Leicester City ===
Uchechi was loaned in January 2011 to Leicester City. He was not given a squad number for the 2010–11 season for Leicester City and did not feature for the first team. In a reserve game for Leicester City, against San Jose Earthquakes in a behind-closed-doors friendly at Belvoir Drive, he scored a penalty after Miguel Vítor had been fouled in the penalty area.

=== Trials with UK clubs ===
Uchechi was to start the 2011/2012 pre-season training with Scottish Premier League side Aberdeen on 20 July 2011, however, Uchechi played the second half of a pre-season friendly for English side Peterborough United on trial.

=== Loan to Sheffield Wednesday ===
Following a successful short trial at Sheffield Wednesday, Megson was impressed with his good feet, good pace and ability to get a goal and offered him a loan move until January 2012. Uchechi became Gary Megson's seventh summer recruit and was given the number 27. He made his Owls debut in the League Cup win against Blackpool on 11 August 2011 just hours after he put pen to paper. On 24 November 2011 it was confirmed that his loan spell with the club had been cut short.

=== Aberdeen ===
Aberdeen FC's Craig Brown signed Uchechi on a six-month deal, with the possibility of a two-year extension, on 31 January 2012 after a week-long trial.

=== Sweden ===
On 26 November 2012 it was announced that Swedish club AFC United had signed Uchechi on a two-year deal.

He signed with Dalkurd, another Swedish club in April 2014.

=== Return to England ===
Following a spell with BSV Hürtürkel in the German fifth tier, Uchechi joined Boreham Wood for the 2016–17 season. Uchechi joined Hendon for the 2017–18 season. After manager Gary McCann joined Hampton & Richmond Borough for the 2018–19 season, Uchechi followed him shortly afterwards. In December 2018 he joined Cray Wanderers, and then South Park in March 2019. Uchechi scored on his debut for Hornchurch on 10 August 2019. He briefly joined Burgess Hill Town in March 2020, before joining East Grinstead Town at the start of the 2020–21 season. He re-joined Burgess Hill in August 2021, before re-joining Cray two months later. In February 2022 he re-joined East Grinstead.

== International career ==
Uchechi received his first international callup in the 2008 Intercontinental Cup in Malaysia. He was called up for an African Youth Championship qualifier in Senegal, and for both legs against Sudan, but had to pull out with injury. He played three games by the 2009 FIFA U-20 World Cup for the Nigeria national under-20 football team.
