= Isaac Osbourne =

British footballer (born 1986)

Personal information
- Full name: Isaac Samuel Osbourne
- Date of birth: 22 June 1986 (age 40)
- Place of birth: Birmingham, England
- Height: 5 ft 10 in (1.78 m)
- Position: Midfielder

Youth career
- –2003: Coventry City

Senior career*
Years	Team	Apps	(Gls)
2003–2011	Coventry City	122	(0)
2006	→ Crewe Alexandra (loan)	2	(0)
2011–2013	Aberdeen	46	(1)
2013–2014	Partick Thistle	12	(0)
2014–2015	St Mirren	14	(0)
Total		196	(1)
- * Club domestic league appearances and goals

Isaac Samuel Osbourne (born 22 June 1986) is an English former professional footballer. He played as a midfielder. Having progressed through the youth set-up at Coventry City, Osbourne made over 122 appearances in all competitions for the club. He most recently played for St Mirren. He is the older brother of midfielder Isaiah Osbourne. A persistent knee injury troubled Osbourne throughout most of his career. The injury subsequently forced him to retire from football aged 28.

== Club career ==
=== Coventry City ===
Born in Birmingham, West Midlands, Osbourne started out playing football at Derby County after he and his brother, Isaiah were spotted and offered a trial. The brothers went on trial at Aston Villa, after which Isaiah was signed by Villa. Shortly after, Osbourne went on trial at Coventry City and the club signed him on youth terms in 1999. He progressed through the Coventry City's youth system. There, three years later, he was promoted to the club's reserve side. During the 2002–03 season, Osbourne was called up to the first team for the first time by Manager Gary McAllister. Shortly after, he appeared as an unused substitute for the first time, in a 1–0 loss against Watford on 1 February 2003. Osbourne made his debut in the first team at Coventry City at 16 years of age and 308 days. He made another appearance for the club, starting a match and played 66 minutes before being substituted, in a 0–0 draw against Millwall in the last game of the season. At the end of the 2002–03 season, Osbourne went on to make two appearances in all competitions.

Ahead of the 2003–04 season, Osbourne was given a number twenty–five shirt. However, throughout the season, he appeared twice as an unused substitute. Instead, Osbourne was featured in Coventry City's reserve team. The start of the 2004–05 season continued to see the player feature in the club's reserve team instead of the first team. He made his first appearance of the 2004–05 season against Watford on 18 December 2004, starting the whole game, as Coventry City won 1–0. Osbourne then appeared in a handful of first team football, making four starts for the club. However, he suffered injuries that saw him out for the rest of the 2004–05 season. At the end of the 2004–05 season, Osbourne went on to make nine appearances in all competitions. He was awarded the 'Young Player of the Year Award' in 2005; previous winners of the award include Gary McSheffrey and Chris Kirkland. At the end of 2004–05 season, Osbourne was offered a new deal at the club, which he accepted.

At the start of the 2005–06 season, Osbourne made his first appearance of the season, coming on as a late substitute, in a 2–0 win against Queens Park Rangers on 20 August 2005. This was followed up by making his first starts of the season for Coventry City, in a 2–1 loss against Sheffield United. However, he suffered a calf injury that saw him out for months. Osbourne returned to the starting line–up against Millwall on 10 December 2005, as the club won 1–0. Following his return, he started in the next five matches for Coventry City throughout December. However, in early 2006, Osbourne damaged his lateral collateral ligament and had an operation, which was successful, but this ruled him out of the second half of the season. By March, he was making progress on his road to recovery from his injury. Osbourne returned to the first team, appearing two times as an unused substitute in the remaining matches of the 2005–06 season and made ten appearances in all competitions. Despite his absent, he was awarded Sky Blue Trust Young Player of the Year.

At the start of the 2006–07 season, Osbourne appeared once for Coventry City, coming against Norwich City as a substitute, in a 3–0 win on 9 September 2006. Following his loan spell at Crewe Alexandra ended, he made his first appearance for the club, coming on as a 74th-minute substitute, in a 1–1 draw against Southend United on 30 December 2006. Since returning to the first team, Osbourne continued to resume his regular first team starter for the rest of the 2006–07 season. In a match against Hull City on 3 March 2007, he set up a goal for Leon McKenzie to set up Coventry City's second goal of the game, in a 2–0 win. At the end of the 2006–07 season, Osbourne went on to make twenty–one appearances in all competitions. Following this, he signed a contract extension with Coventry City by signing a four-year deal, keeping him until 2011.

At the start of the 2007–08 season, Osbourne continued to become a regular team starter, playing in the midfield position. He then set up a goal for Dele Adebola to score the club's first goal of the game, in a 3–0 win against Notts County in the first round of the League Cup. However, September saw Osbourne being sidelined on two occasions. He made his return to the starting line–up against Blackpool on 2 October 2007, as Coventry City won 3–1. Three weeks later on 30 October 2007, Osbourne set up the club's only goal of the game, as they lost 1–1 against West Ham United in the last 16 of the League Cup. Since returning from injury, he regained his first team place and later filled in the right-back position, following loanee-Richard Duffy injury. At the end of the 2007–08 season, Osbourne went on to make forty–nine appearances in all competitions. Following this, he was named Coventry City's Players' Player of the Year.

However at the start of the 2008–09 season, Osbourne suffered an injury that saw him miss the first four matches of the season. He made his first appearance of the season against Preston North End on 13 September 2008, starting the whole game, as Coventry City drew 0–0. After the match, Manager Chris Coleman said he was happy that Osbourne made a return from injury and even describing him as a "comeback kid". Following his return, he regained his first team place, starting in either the centre–midfield and right–back positions for the next two months. However, during a 1–1 draw against Swansea City on 25 November 2008, Osbourne suffered ankle injury that saw him substituted in the 13th minute. After the match, he was sidelined for three months with ankle injury. By February, Osbourne was making good progress on his recovery from his ankle injury. He made his first team return after being sidelined for three months on 4 March 2009 against Sheffield United, coming on as a second-half substitute, in a 2–1 loss. Following his return, Osbourne found his playing time from the substitute bench, and manager Chris Coleman revealed that he turned down a loan request for the player, insisting he is in his [Coleman] plan. Osbourne then set up a goal for the club's only goal of the game, in a 1–1 draw against Crystal Palace on 7 April 2009. He regained his first team place in the remaining matches of the 2008–09 season, playing in either the centre–midfield and right–back positions. At the end of the 2008–09 season, Osbourne went on to make twenty–six appearances in all competitions.

At the start of the 2009–10 season, Osbourne started the season well when he set up two goals in the first two league matches against Ipswich Town and Barnsley. Since the start of the 2009–10 season, Osbourne continued to establish himself in the starting eleven, playing in either the centre–midfield and right–back positions. However, he suffered a knee injury that eventually saw him sidelined for the rest of the 2009–10 season. Prior to this, Osbourne suffered a knee injury on two occasions earlier in the 2009–10 season, but made a quick recovery. At the end of the 2009–10 season, he went on to make sixteen appearances in all competitions.

The 2010–11 season saw Osbourne continuing to recover from a knee injury and was eventually sidelined for the rest of the season as well without making an appearance this season. He spoke about his injury, saying: "When you are out for so long you do occasionally wonder if you will ever play again, but you can't allow yourself to think like that. But I'm no sob story. I just want to get fit and play again. But the manager has encouraged me and told me not to rush back and that I will get my opportunity, and you can't ask for more than that. I don't want any favours, just an equal opportunity and then it is up to me to take my chance. I would love to get into the first team again but it won't be the end of the world if I don't because there are a lot of clubs out there and at the moment the most important thing for me is that I get fit and play again." At the end of the 2010–11 season, Osbourne was released by Coventry City after he wasn't offered a new contract by the club.

==== Crewe Alexandra (loan) ====
On 22 October 2006, Osbourne was loaned out to League One side Crewe Alexandra,

He made his debut for the club two days later on 25 October 2006, playing 120 minutes, in their League Cup game against Manchester United. Manager Micky Adams said: "Going to Crewe will be the best thing that has ever happened to Isaac. The facts are that he's a very young man with little or no future ahead of him if he stays where he is." Having made two more appearances for the club, Osbourne was subsequently recalled by Coventry City.

=== Aberdeen ===
After being released by Coventry City, Osbourne went on trial at Scottish Premier League side Aberdeen. The day after his trial was announced, the club says they confirmed their interests signing the player. The following month, he went on another trial at the Dons to earn a contract.

On 30 June 2011, Osbourne signed a one-year contract with Aberdeen, following a trials. Upon joining the club, he said Aberdeen has helped his career by overcoming his injury and credited Craig Brown for reviving his career. Osbourne made his debut for the club, starting the whole game, in a 0–0 draw against St Johnstone in the opening game of the season. After making his Aberdeen debut, he expressed his delight and describe his debut as a "dream". Since making his debut for Aberdeen, he quickly made an immediate impact, having established himself in the first team, leading Manager Brown revealed that the club has begun a contract negotiations to tie up the player a new deal. However, Osbourne suffered a hamstring injury during a match against Forfar Athletic in the fourth round in the Scottish Cup and was substituted in the first half, as Aberdeen won 4–0. After the match, he needed to have a knee operation and was sidelined for four months. While on the sidelines, Osbourne signed a one-year contract extension with Aberdeen, keeping him until 2013. On 12 May 2012, he made his return to the first team, coming on as a substitute for Kári Árnason in the 75th minute, as the club drew 0–0 with St Mirren. At the end of the 2011–12 season, Osbourne went on to make twenty–six appearances in all competitions.

At the start of the 2012–13 season, Osbourne started the season strongly when he scored his first goal in 176 competitive appearances, for Aberdeen against St Johnstone in Perth. He continued to regain his first team place, playing in the midfield position. In November, during a match against Hibs on 24 November 2012, Osbourne suffered another hamstring injury that cause him to be out for two months. In early January, he soon made a recovery from injury and return to full training. Osbourne made his return to the first team, coming on as a 65th-minute substitute, in a 3–0 loss against Inverness Caledonian Thistle on 19 January 2013. He then played three times in a centre–back position in the club's next four matches. However, during a 1–0 win against Dundee on 15 February 2013, he suffered a hamstring injury once again and was sidelined for six weeks. On 27 April 2013, Osbourne returned to the starting line–up in a centre–back position against Kilmarnock and kept a clean sheet, in a 1–0 win. He, once again, played in the centre–back position for the next two matches against Dundee and St. Mirren. At the end of the 2012–13 season, Osbourne went on to make twenty–seven appearances in all competitions.

It was announced on 13 May 2013 that his contract along with another six players would not be extended by Aberdeen. He previously spoke out about his contract, saying his career in Aberdeen is in doubt over his personal issues, with his contract expected to expire in the summer.

=== Partick Thistle ===
On 31 July 2013, Partick Thistle announced that they have brought in Osbourne from Aberdeen on a free transfer.

Having appeared in the first three matches of the season as an unused substitute, he made his debut for the club, starting a match and played 79 minutes, in a 1–0 loss against Motherwell on 24 August 2013. Since joining Partick Thistle, Osbourne quickly became a first team regular, playing in the midfield position. However, he suffered a knee injury in an abandoned match against St Johnstone at Firhill in late 2013. After the match, Osbourne underwent surgery and the injury left him unavailable for the remainder of the 2013/14 season. After making thirteen appearances in his first season, Osbourne said he might want to continue on at the club. Following this statement, Osbourne continued to recover from his knee injury, while dealing with the ongoing negotiations with Partick Thistle.

=== St Mirren ===
Osbourne signed a one-year contract with Scottish Premiership side, St Mirren on 21 August 2014.

He made his debut for the club, starting a match and played 70 minutes, in a 3–0 loss against Dundee United on 30 August 2014. However, Osbourne suffered a knee injury that saw him out for three months. On 6 December 2014, he returned to the first team, starting the whole game, in a 1–0 loss against St Johnstone. Following this, Osbourne soon received a handful of first team opportunities for the next two months. However, he suffered ankle injury that saw him sidelined for six weeks. On 21 April 2015, Osbourne left the club by mutual consent prior to the end of the season. By the time he left St Mirren, Osbourne made 18 appearances in total, without scoring a goal. Following this, he announced his retirement from professional football at age 28, due to his persistent knee injury.

== Personal life ==
Born and raised in Erdington, Osbourne is the older brother of midfielder Isaiah Osbourne and has six brothers and four sisters. Growing up, he revealed that his family were Aston Villa supporters, and that his father, Ivan, used to be a footballer in amateur football.

Osbourne revealed he attended Henley College in Coventry to study BTEC National Certificate in Sport and plans to become a carpenter when he retires. In March 2009, Osbourne became a father for the first time when his partner gave birth to a baby girl, Remaya. During the 2011–12 season, Isaac and Isaiah both played for Aberdeen and Hibernian in the same league and played against each other on two occasions. They also played together during his time at Coventry City when they played against each other against Nottingham Forest on 18 April 2009.
