= Jamie Masson =

Scottish footballer

Personal information
- Date of birth: 5 April 1993 (age 33)
- Place of birth: Fraserburgh, Scotland
- Position: Midfielder

Team information
- Current team: Granville Rage
- Number: 7

Senior career*
Years	Team	Apps	(Gls)
2012–2015	Aberdeen	11	(1)
2014	→ Elgin City (loan)	9	(1)
2014–2015	→ Brechin City (loan)	14	(3)
2015	→ Brechin City (loan)	7	(1)
2015–2017	Formartine United		
2017–2023	Cove Rangers	83	(35)
2023	Hakoah FC	10	(2)
2024–2026	Bankstown City Lions	50	(5)
2026–	Granville Rage	0	(0)
- * Club domestic league appearances and goals as of 27 June 2026 (UTC)

Jamie Masson (born 5 April 1993) is a Scottish professional footballer who plays for Granville Rage. Masson has previously played for Aberdeen, Formartine United, Elgin City, Brechin City and Bankstown City Lions.

== Club career ==
Masson made his Aberdeen debut in a 3–0 defeat to Dunfermline Athletic on 28 April 2012. Masson scored his first senior goal for the club when he found the net for Aberdeen against Kilmarnock on 5 May 2012. On 8 January 2014, Masson signed for Scottish League Two side Elgin City on a loan deal until the end of the 2013–14 season.

On 28 August 2014, Masson joined Brechin City on loan until January 2015. On 23 March 2015, he signed for Brechin on loan again until the end of the 2014–15 season. Masson was released by Aberdeen at the end of the season.

On 2 October 2015, Masson joined Formartine United.

On 26 January 2023, after enjoying much success with Cove Rangers, having been a part of their rise from the 5th-tier Highland League up to the 2nd-tier Scottish Championship, Masson left Cove Rangers by mutual consent in order to realise a life-long ambition to emigrate to Australia.

== Style of play ==
Masson is a central midfielder. His former Aberdeen manager Craig Brown described him as being, "a big, strong midfield player" and compared him to Jim Bett.
