= 2009–10 Aberdeen F.C. season =

Aberdeen
2009–10 season
- Chairman: Stewart Milne
- Manager: Mark McGhee
- Stadium: Pittodrie Stadium
- Scottish Premier League: 9th place
- Scottish Cup: Fifth Round
- League Cup: Third Round
- Top goalscorer: League: Steve MacLean (5); All: Four players (5)
- Highest home attendance: 16,803 v Celtic (9 August)
- Lowest home attendance: 6,097 v Kilmarnock (5 May)
- Average home league attendance: 11,012
Home colours	Away colours

The 2009–10 season was Aberdeen's 97th season in the top flight of Scottish football. Aberdeen competed in the Scottish Premier League, Scottish Cup, Scottish League Cup and UEFA Europa League. during the 2009–10 season.

== Season overview ==
Aberdeen started the new season under new management. On the last day of the 2008–09 it was announced that Jimmy Calderwood and his management team would leave after five years at the club. Aberdeen negotiated with fellow SPL club Motherwell for the release of their manager, Mark McGhee. McGhee had a successful spell at the club as a player, when the Dons' won the European Cup Winners' Cup in 1983. Along with his assistant Scott Leitch the pair would form Aberdeen's new management team. In the summer, Aberdeen lost their captain, Scott Severin, who left to pursue a career in England with Championship club Watford. The club also parted ways with four other players; defender Lee Mair joined fellow SPL club St Mirren. Jamie Smith joined MLS side Colorado Rapids, goalkeeper Bertrand Bossu had his contract terminated by the club and he was signed up with English club Crewe Alexandra. The club also parted ways with Faroese youngster Rogvi Holm. With the squad depleting, McGhee sought out to buy new players. McGhee tried to sign Benin international Réda Johnson, but the defender choose to move to English outfit Plymouth Argyle. McGhee did make his first signing, goalkeeper Stuart Nelson from Norwich City. Jerel Ifil, Davide Grassi and Maurice Ross joined from Swindon Town, Espanyol and Kocaelispor respectively. Aberdeen became one of the first clubs to participate in the newly re-branded Europa League. Aberdeen were drawn against Czech opposition in Sigma Olomouc. It soon proved to be a tie to forget, as the Dons were humbled 5–1 at home, and 3–0 away, which resulted in an 8–1 aggregate score. Aberdeen were also knocked out early in the League Cup as well. After falling 2–0 down, goals from Michael Paton ensure that the cup tie against Dundee would go into extra time. Aberdeen lost the game 3–2. Aberdeen started their League campaign with a 3–1 defeat to Celtic, but with wins against Hamilton, St Mirren, St Johnstone and a notable one against rivals Rangers have got Aberdeen's season back on track.

== Transfers ==
=== Transfers ===
In Permanent

Player	From	Fee	Contract length
(England) Stuart Nelson	(England) Norwich City	Free	One year
(England) Jerel Ifil	(England) Swindon Town	Free	Two year
(Italy) Davide Grassi	(Spain) Espanyol	Undisclosed	One year
(Scotland) Maurice Ross	(Turkey) Kocaelispor	Free	One year

Loans in

Player	From	Loan Length
(England) Paul Marshall	(England) Manchester City	End of Season
(Scotland) Steve MacLean	(England) Plymouth Argyle	End of Season
(Scotland) Jim Paterson	(England) Plymouth Argyle	End of Season

Loans out

Player	To	Loan Length
(England) John Bateman	(Scotland) Peterhead	One year
(Scotland) Stuart Duff	(Scotland) Inverness Caledonian Thistle	One month
(Scotland) Chris Maguire	(Scotland) Kilmarnock	End of season

Out Permanent

Player	To	Fee	Note
(Scotland) Lee Mair	(Scotland) St Mirren	Free	End of contract
(Scotland) Scott Severin	(England) Watford	Free	End of contract
(Scotland) Jamie Smith	(United States) Colorado Rapids	Free	End of Contract
(France) Bertrand Bossu	(England) Crewe Alexandra	Free	End of Contract
(Faroe Islands) Rogvi Holm		Free	Released
(Northern Ireland) Sammy Stewart		Free	Released
(Scotland) Maurice Ross	(China) Beijing Guoan	Free	End of contract
(England) Tommy Wright	(England) Grimsby Town	Free	Released
(Scotland) Lee Miller	(England) Middlesbrough	£500,000	–

== Statistics ==
=== Current squad ===
Updated 22 April 2010 Note: Flags indicate national team as defined under FIFA eligibility rules; some limited exceptions apply. Players may hold more than one non-FIFA nationality.

No.	Pos.	Nation	Player
1	GK	SCO	Jamie Langfield
2	DF	SCO	Charlie Mulgrew
3	DF	SCO	Ricky Foster
4	MF	SCO	Gary McDonald
5	DF	SCO	Zander Diamond (vice-captain)
6	DF	SCO	Andrew Considine
8	MF	SCO	Mark Kerr (captain)
9	FW	SCO	Steve MacLean (on loan from Plymouth Argyle)
10	FW	SCO	Darren Mackie
11	MF	NGA	Sone Aluko
14	MF	SCO	Derek Young
15	DF	SCO	Jim Paterson (on loan from Plymouth Argyle)

No.	Pos.	Nation	Player
16	MF	SCO	Stuart Duff
18	DF	ITA	Davide Grassi
19	MF	SCO	Peter Pawlett
20	MF	ENG	Paul Marshall (on loan from Manchester City)
21	GK	ENG	Stuart Nelson
22	DF	ENG	Jerel Ifil
24	FW	SCO	Michael Paton
25	DF	SCO	Jonathan Crawford
27	DF	SCO	Stirling Smith
30	GK	SCO	Jon Bateman
32	DF	SCO	Scott Ross
34	MF	SCO	Fraser Fyvie

=== Player statistics ===
Appearances for competitive matches only

No.	Pos	Nat	Player	Total		Premier League		Scottish Cup		League Cup		Europe	
No.	Pos	Nat	Player	Apps	Goals	Apps	Goals	Apps	Goals	Apps	Goals	Apps	Goals
1	GK	(Scotland) SCO	Jamie Langfield	40	0	34	0	3	0	1	0	2	0
2	DF	(Scotland) SCO	Charlie Mulgrew	41	5	36	4	2	0	1	0	2	1
3	DF	(Scotland) SCO	Ricky Foster	41	0	36	0	2	0	1	0	2	0
4	MF	(Scotland) SCO	Gary McDonald	28	4	23	3	2	1	1	0	2	0
5	DF	(Scotland) SCO	Zander Diamond	18	3	16	3	2	0	0	0	0	0
6	DF	(Scotland) SCO	Andrew Considine	19	1	16	1	0	0	1	0	2	0
7	FW	(Scotland) SCO	Chris Maguire	21	1	17	1	1	0	1	0	2	0
7	DF	(Scotland) SCO	Jim Paterson	9	0	7	0	2	0	0	0	0	0
8	MF	(Scotland) SCO	Mark Kerr	42	0	36	0	3	0	1	0	2	0
9	FW	(Scotland) SCO	Lee Miller	22	4	18	3	1	1	1	0	2	0
9	FW	(Scotland) SCO	Steven MacLean	17	5	15	5	2	0	0	0	0	0
10	FW	(Scotland) SCO	Darren Mackie	37	5	31	4	3	1	1	0	2	0
11	MF	(Nigeria) NGA	Sone Aluko	26	3	22	3	2	0	0	0	2	0
14	MF	(Scotland) SCO	Derek Young	24	3	20	3	3	0	0	0	1	0
15	MF	(England) ENG	Tommy Wright	3	0	3	0	0	0	0	0	0	0
16	MF	(Scotland) SCO	Stuart Duff	18	0	16	0	0	0	0	0	2	0
17	DF	(Scotland) SCO	Maurice Ross	7	0	6	0	1	0	0	0	0	0
18	DF	(Italy) ITA	Davide Grassi	23	0	22	0	0	0	1	0	0	0
19	MF	(Scotland) SCO	Peter Pawlett	17	0	14	0	2	0	1	0	0	0
20	MF	(England) ENG	Paul Marshall	10	0	9	0	1	0	0	0	0	0
21	GK	(England) ENG	Stuart Nelson	3	0	3	0	0	0	0	0	0	0
22	DF	(England) ENG	Jerel Ifil	30	0	26	0	3	0	1	0	0	0
24	FW	(Scotland) SCO	Michael Paton	38	5	34	3	2	0	1	2	1	0
25	DF	(Scotland) SCO	Jonathan Crawford	3	0	2	0	0	0	1	0	0	0
31	FW	(Scotland) SCO	Mitchel Megginson	3	0	2	0	0	0	0	0	1	0
34	MF	(Scotland) SCO	Fraser Fyvie	26	1	25	1	1	0	0	0	0	0
35	MF	(Scotland) SCO	Nicky Low	1	0	1	0	0	0	0	0	0	0
42	DF	(Scotland) SCO	Clark Robertson	2	0	2	0	0	0	0	0	0	0
45	FW	(Scotland) SCO	Dominico Gibson	1	0	1	0	0	0	0	0	0	0
52	MF	(Scotland) SCO	Jack Grimmer	2	0	2	0	0	0	0	0	0	0

As of game played 1 May 2010

=== Most appearances ===
Rank	Player	SPL	SC	LC	EL	Total
1.	(Scotland) Mark Kerr	36	3	1	2	42
2.	(Scotland) Richard Foster	36	2	1	2	41
3.	(Scotland) Charlie Mulgrew	36	2	1	2	41
4.	(Scotland) Jamie Langfield	34	3	1	2	40
5.	(Scotland) Michael Paton	34	2	1	1	38

Source: above appearances and goals table

=== Top scorers ===
Rank	Player	SPL	SC	LC	EL	Total
1.	(Scotland) Steve MacLean	5	0	0	0	5
2.	(Scotland) Charlie Mulgrew	4	0	0	1	5
3.	(Scotland) Darren Mackie	4	1	0	0	5
4.	(Scotland) Michael Paton	3	0	2	0	5
5.	(Scotland) Lee Miller	3	1	0	0	4
6.	(Scotland) Gary McDonald	3	1	0	0	4
7.	(Scotland) Zander Diamond	3	0	0	0	3
8.	(Scotland) Derek Young	3	0	0	0	3
9.	(Nigeria) Sone Aluko	2	0	0	0	2
10.	(Scotland) Andrew Considine	1	0	0	0	1
11.	(Scotland) Chris Maguire	1	0	0	0	1
12.	(Scotland) Fraser Fyvie	1	0	0	0	1
13.	(Scotland) Mark Kerr	1	0	0	0	1

=== Awards ===
==== Clydesdale Bank Awards ====
Month	Recipient	Award	Report
November	(Scotland) Peter Pawlett	Young Player of the Month	
January	(Scotland) Fraser Fyvie	Young Player of the Month	AFC

== Results and fixtures ==
=== Pre-season friendlies ===
Date	Opponent	H/A	Score (Note: Aberdeen's score is shown first.)	Aberdeen Scorer(s) (Note: The number(s) in brackets shows the minute the goal(s) was/were scored.)	Attendance	Report
18 July 2009	(Germany) 1860 Munich	A	0–1		1,000	AFC
22 July 2009	Peterhead	A	3–2	Miller (30 pen.), Aluko (53), Paton (63)	1,954	AFC
25 July 2009	Dundee	A	1–1	Aluko (1)	3,613	AFC
9 August 2009	(England) Hull City	A	1–0	Gardner (o.g.)	8,272	AFC

=== Scottish Premier League ===
Match day	Date	Opponent	H/A	Score	Aberdeen Scorer(s)	League Position (Note: Shows Aberdeen's position in the table at end of day the match was played on)	Attendance	Report
1	15 August 2009	Celtic	H	1–3	Aluko (61)	9	16,803	BBC Sport
2	22 August 2009	Hamilton Academical	A	3–0	Mulgrew (23), Considine (29), Maguire (63)	6	3,347	BBC Sport
3	29 August 2009	Motherwell	H	0–0		6	11,320	BBC Sport
4	14 September 2009	Falkirk	A	0–0		6	4,724	BBC Sport
5	19 September 2009	St Mirren	H	1–0	Mulgrew (88)	5	10,103	BBC Sport
6	26 September 2009	Rangers	A	0–0		5	47,968	BBC Sport
7	3 October 2009	Kilmarnock	A	1–1	McDonald (84)	6	4,997	BBC Sport
8	17 October 2009	Heart of Midlothian	H	1–1	Miller (42)	6	11,629	BBC Sport
9	24 October 2009	Dundee United	H	0–2		7	11,766	BBC Sport
10	31 October 2009	Hibernian	A	0–2		7	13,885	BBC Sport
11	7 November 2009	St Johnstone	H	2–1	Aluko (15), Miller (83) (pen.)	6	10,894	BBC Sport
12	21 November 2009	Motherwell	A	1–1	McDonald (67)	6	4,668	BBC Sport
13	28 November 2009	Rangers	H	1–0	Miller (17)	6	16,153	BBC Sport
14	5 December 2009	Celtic	A	0–3		6	56,010	BBC Sport
15	12 December 2009	Hamilton Academical	H	1–2	McDonald (75)	6	9,499	BBC Sport
16	19 December 2009	Hibernian	H	0–2		6	9,096	BBC Sport
17	2 January 2010	Dundee United	A	1–0	Mulgrew (15)	6	10,032	BBC Sport
18	12 January 2010	St Mirren	A	0–1		6	3,867	BBC Sport
19	23 January 2010	Kilmarnock	H	1–0	Young (49)	7	12,150	BBC Sport
20	27 January 2010	Heart of Midlothian	A	3–0	Fyvie (12), Mackie (50), Young (75)	6	14,219	BBC Sport
21	30 January 2010	Motherwell	H	0–3		7	9,555	BBC Sport
22	2 February 2010	Falkirk	H	0–1		7	7,741	BBC Sport
23	10 February 2010	Hibernian	A	2–2	Paton (25), MacLean (34)	6	10,469	BBC Sport
24	13 February 2010	Celtic	H	4–4	Paton (9), Mackie (37), MacLean (75 pen), (88)	7	14,898	BBC Sport
25	20 February 2010	Falkirk	A	1–3	Mulgrew (5)	7	4,643	BBC Sport
26	27 February 2010	Heart of Midlothian	H	0–1		7	8,316	BBC Sport
27	6 March 2010	Hamilton Academical	A	1–1	Diamond (76)	7	2,030	BBC Sport
28	16 March 2010	St Johnstone	A	0–1		8	3,826	BBC Sport
29	20 March 2010	Dundee United	H	2–2	Diamond (32), Paton (45) (pen.)	8	9,316	BBC Sport
30	27 March 2010	St Mirren	H	2–1	Diamond (37), Aluko (56)	8	8,764	BBC Sport
31	4 April 2010	Kilmarnock	A	0–2		8	4,825	BBC Sport
32	7 April 2010	Rangers	A	1–3	Mackie (68)	8	47,061	BBC Sport
33	11 April 2010	St Johnstone	H	1–3	Mackie (17)	9	7,568	BBC Sport
34	17 April 2010	Falkirk	H	1–0	MacLean (11)	9	10,461	BBC Sport
35	24 April 2010	St Johnstone	A	1–1	MacLean (16)	9	3,295	BBC Sport
36	1 May 2010	Hamilton Academical	H	1–3	Young (85)	9	7,099	BBC Sport
37	5 May 2010	Kilmarnock	H	1–2	Kerr (26)	9	6,097	BBC Sport
38	8 May 2010	St Mirren	A	1–0	Mair (27) (o.g.)	9	4,022	BBC Sport

=== UEFA Europa League ===
Round	Date	Opponent	H/A	Score	Aberdeen Scorer(s)	Attendance	Report
TQR	30 July 2009	(Czech Republic) Sigma Olomouc	H	1–5	Mulgrew (23)	13,973	BBC Sport
TQR	6 August 2009	(Czech Republic) Sigma Olomouc	A	0–3		7,405	BBC Sport

=== Scottish League Cup ===
Round	Date	Opponent	H/A	Score	Aberdeen Scorer(s)	Attendance	Report
Third Round	22 September 2009	Dundee	A	2–3 (a.e.t.)	Paton (63, 88)	6,131	BBC Sport

=== Scottish Cup ===
Round	Date	Opponent	H/A	Score	Aberdeen Scorer(s)	Attendance	Report
Fourth Round	9 January 2010	Hearts	H	2–0	Mackie (60), Miller (76)	8,226	BBC Sport
Fifth Round	6 February 2010	Raith Rovers	A	1–1	McDonald (90)	7,045	BBC Sport
Fifth Round Replay	16 February 2010	Raith Rovers	H	0–1		8,153	BBC Sport

== Competitions ==
=== Overall ===
Competition	Started round	Current position / round	Final position / round	First match	Last match
Scottish Premier League	—	—	9th	15 August 2009	8 May 2010
League Cup	3rd Round	—	3rd Round	22 September 2009	22 September 2009
Scottish Cup	4th Round	—	5th Round	9 January 2010	16 February 2010
UEFA Europa League	Third qualifying round	—	Third qualifying round	30 July 2009	6 August 2009

Source: Competitions

=== SPL ===
==== Classification ====
Pos	Team	Pld	W	D	L	GF	GA	GD	Pts
7	Hamilton Academical	38	13	10	15	39	46	−7	49
8	St Johnstone	38	12	11	15	57	61	−4	47
9	Aberdeen	38	10	11	17	36	52	−16	41
10	St Mirren	38	7	13	18	36	49	−13	34
11	Kilmarnock	38	8	9	21	29	51	−22	33

Source: SPFL Archive
Rules for classification: 1) points; 2) goal difference; 3) number of goals scored.

==== Results summary ====
Overall								Home						Away					
Pld	W	D	L	GF	GA	GD	Pts	W	D	L	GF	GA	GD	W	D	L	GF	GA	GD
38	10	11	17	36	52	−16	41	6	4	10	20	31	−11	4	7	7	16	21	−5

Source: BBC Sport

==== Results by round ====
Round	1	2	3	4	5	6	7	8	9	10	11	12	13	14	15	16	17	18	19	20	21	22	23	24	25	26	27	28	29	30	31	32	33	34	35	36	37	38
Ground	H	A	H	A	H	A	A	H	H	A	H	A	H	A	H	H	A	A	H	A	H	H	A	H	A	H	A	A	H	H	A	A	H	H	A	H	H	A
Result	L	W	D	D	W	D	D	D	L	L	W	D	W	L	L	L	W	L	W	W	L	L	D	D	L	L	D	L	D	W	L	L	L	W	D	L	L	W
Position	9	6	6	6	5	5	6	6	7	7	6	6	6	6	6	6	6	6	6	6	7	7	6	7	7	7	7	8	8	8	8	8	9	9	9	9	9	9

Source: BBC Sport
A = Away; H = Home; W = Win; D = Draw; L = Loss

==== League Positions ====
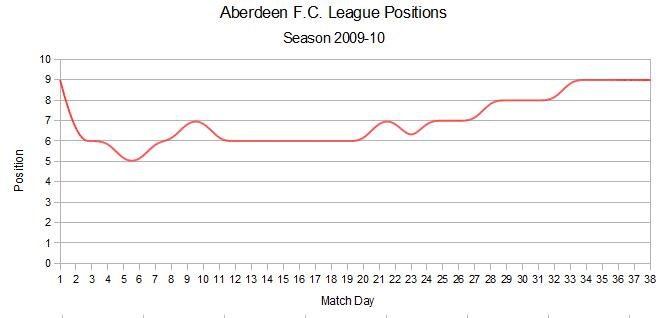

==== Results by opponent ====
Team	Results				Points
Team	1	2	3	4	Points
Celtic	1–3	0–3	4–4		1
Dundee United	0–2	1–0	2–2		4
Falkirk	0–0	0–1	1–3	1–0	4
Hamilton Academical	3–0	1–2	1–1	1–3	4
Heart of Midlothian	1–1	3–0	0–1		4
Hibernian	0–2	0–2	2–2		1
Kilmarnock	1–1	1–0	0–2	1–2	4
Motherwell	0–0	1–1	0–3		2
Rangers	0–0	1–0	1–3		4
St Johnstone	2–1	0–1	1–3	1–1	4
St Mirren	1–0	0–1	2–1	1–0	9

Source: 2009–10 Scottish Premier League article

== Club ==
=== Management ===
Position	Staff
Manager	(Scotland) Mark McGhee
Assistant manager	(Scotland) Scott Leitch

Source: afc.co.uk

=== Other information ===
Chairman	(Scotland) Stewart Milne
Managing Director	(Scotland) Duncan Fraser
Executive Director	(Scotland) Willie Miller
Ground (capacity and dimensions)	Pittodrie Stadium (22,199 / 109x72 yards)

Source: afc.co.uk

== See also ==
- List of Aberdeen F.C. seasons
