= 2008–09 Aberdeen F.C. season =

Aberdeen
2008–09 season
- Chairman: Stewart Milne
- Manager: Jimmy Calderwood
- Stadium: Pittodrie Stadium
- Scottish Premier League: 4th
- Scottish Cup: Quarter-finals
- League Cup: Third Round
- Top goalscorer: League: Lee Miller (10); All: Lee Miller (12)
- Highest home attendance: 20,441 v Rangers (24 January)
- Lowest home attendance: 8,909 v Falkirk (13 December)
- Average home league attendance: 12,948
Home colours	Away colours

Aberdeen competed in the Scottish Premier League, Scottish Cup and Scottish League Cup during the 2008–09 season.

Richie Byrne, Barry Nicholson, Steve Lovell, Derek Soutar, Dave Bus, Jonathan Smith, Greg Kelly, Alan Maybury, Jackie McNamara and Dan Smith all left the club, mostly on Bosman transfers, and Josh Walker returned down South to Middlesbrough. On 5 July 2008, Karim Touzani returned to his native homeland of Netherlands to sign for Dutch side Sparta Rotterdam.

The club brought in several players; Bertrand Bossu, Sammy Stewart, Gary McDonald, Mark Kerr, Charlie Mulgrew were all given two-year contracts by the club. Tommy Wright signed from Darlington, he cost £100,000 and was given a three-year contract. The club signed Jared Hodgkiss on loan from West Bromwich Albion for the first half of the season, and in January signed Manchester City youngster Javan Vidal until the end of the season. On transfer deadline day, the club signed Sone Aluko from Birmingham City for an undisclosed fee.

== Review ==
=== Pre-season ===
Aberdeen kicked off their pre-season campaign with a 2–0 loss at home to English and European champions, Manchester United. The game marked the 25th anniversary of Aberdeen's 2–1 victory over Real Madrid in the 1982–82 UEFA Cup Winners' Cup final in Gothenburg. Goals from Michael Carrick and Wayne Rooney ensured that Sir Alex Ferguson won on his return to Pittodrie. Three days later the Dons faced 'local rivals' Dundee, The game finished 0–0. The worst result of the pre-season came next, a 4–0 defeat by Peterhead, however Aberdeen recorded their first win of pre-season against Brechin City three days later, Derek Young getting the only goal; and the first of pre-season.

Aberdeen opened their tour of the Netherlands with a 5–0 win over Jimmy Calderwood's son Scott's DZC 68. Chris Maguire scored a hat-trick, Lee Miller and Jamie Smith were also on the scoresheet against the minnows. New signing Gary McDonald scored his first goal for the Dons against FC Zwolle, however two late goals meant that Aberdeen would suffer their first and only defeat of the Dutch tour. The next game saw Aberdeen play top-tier team Vitesse Arnhem, which they won 1–0 thanks to an Andrew Considine goal twenty minutes from time. Aberdeen had been due to play Go Ahead Eagles but the game was scrapped due to police fears of crowd trouble. Instead a game was arranged against minnows SV Rietvogels, in which the Dons scored 10 goals. Captain Scott Severin scored an early goal, the lead was soon doubled by youngster Peter Pawlett, Other goalscorers included Chris Maguire, Jeffrey de Visscher and Michael Paton; trialist Dyon Camero scored four.

Aberdeen followed up their pre-season tour of the Netherlands with a win against Highland league team Inverurie Loco Works at Harlaw Park. Manager Jimmy Calderwood fielded a young team and for the first time Zander Diamond led the team out as captain. Within 17 minutes Aberdeen were 1–0 ahead; U-19 player Michael Paton scored his second goal in as many games, Summer signing, Sammy Stewart scored his first goal for the club; 11 minutes from time, to make it 2–0 and that was the final score.

=== SPL ===
==== August ====
Aberdeen began their SPL campaign with a 2–0 loss at home to North 'rivals' Inverness Caledonian Thistle through goals from Andrew Barrowman and Roy McBain. It was the first time that Aberdeen had been beaten by Inverness, having played them 17 times previously. The Dons travelled to Motherwell for their second game, The match was goalless until four minutes from time, when summer signing Charlie Mulgrew scored from a free-kick, to give Aberdeen their first win. Aberdeen then hosted Glasgow rivals Rangers. Veteran Scotland defender David Weir opened the scoring for the visitors, Derek Young followed up after Lee Miller's shot was blocked by rangers keeper Allan McGregor; to score Aberdeen's first goal of the new season at Pittodrie. The match ended 1–1, but aberdeen were fortunate as DaMarcus Beasley seemed to have won it for Rangers in stoppage time; his goal was disallowed for offside he was however clearly onside. Aberdeen then travelled to Paisley to play St Mirren. A mistake by the St Mirren defence allowed Darren Mackie to score a goal just before half-time, which proved to be the winner.

==== September ====
September, and Aberdeen's first match was a home tie against SPL newcomers Hamilton Academical. The game saw the second debut of Sone Aluko, following his return. Aberdeen took the lead in the 7th minute, summer signing Gary McDonald scored the goal, with Hamilton goalkeeper Tomas Cerny only able to push the ball onto the post and into the net. Hamilton equalised after 34 minutes, David Graham the scorer. A defensive mistake by the Aberdeen defence allowed Hamilton's James McCarthy to score what turned out to be the winner. Aluko hit the bar with a late free-kick, the defeat meant that Aberdeen were still to win at home. Another home defeat followed the week after, Tommy Wright was given his first league start by manager Jimmy Calderwood and it was his handball which allowed Francesco Sandaza to score the only goal from the penalty spot. Aberdeen ended the month with a trip to reigning Champions Celtic. A defensive mistake allowed Dutchman Jan Vennegoor of Hesselink to score the opening goal. Aberdeen equalised early in the second half; Charlie Mulgrew claimed his second goal of the SPL campaign, He scored his third as well minutes later, when he curled a free-kick from the edge of the box, to make the score 2–1 to Aberdeen. Celtic equalised eleven minutes from time when Scott McDonald headed the ball into the net, Vennegoor of Hesselink scored an injury time winner making the score 3–2. This left Aberdeen eleventh in the league table, they had not gained a single point throughout the month of September.

==== October ====
Hibernian came to Pittodrie for Aberdeen's first match in October. A defensive slip by Lee Mair allowed Hibernian striker Derek Riordan to open the scoring after 33 minutes, Lee Miller equalised 8 minutes later from the penalty spot after being fouled by Sol Bamba. Hibernian regained the lead from the penalty spot after Mulgrew, who was red-carded, handled the ball on the line. The ball was directed towards goal by Hibernian striker Steven Fletcher, he was clearly offside but it was not given, so Riordan converted to score his second of the match. Aberdeen then traveled to Falkirk after an International break. Lee Miller headed the only goal to give Aberdeen their first victory in six games, and lift the Dons' off the bottom of the table. Lee Bullen was sent off for Falkirk late on, after a challenge on Scott Severin. Aberdeen then travelled to Edinburgh for the first time in the season to play Heart of Midlothian. It started well for the Dons', Darren Mackie profited from a defensive error and scored the first goal of the game. Hearts however, shortly after, equalised through wing-back Lee Wallace. In the dying minutes, Hearts looked to have been awarded a penalty by referee Steve Conroy, Jamie Langfield appeared to have tripped Michael Stewart in the penalty area, But after consulting with his assistant, the referee reversed his decision and the match finished 1–1.

==== November ====
Aberdeen started November with a home-tie against high-flyers Kilmarnock. A goal by Sone Aluko handed Aberdeen their first home win of the season, and more importantly, all three points. The following week Aberdeen travelled to Dundee to face Dundee United for the second New Firm Derby of the season. It got off to another bad start for the Dons, Francisco Sandaza scored the opening goal in the opening 8 minutes, Northern-Irish striker Warren Feeney doubled the 'tangerine's' advantage on 14 minutes. Aberdeen pulled a goal back through Darren Mackie, but it proved to only be a consolation goal, as the Dons' lost the derby 2–1, although they had a goal disallowed for offside. The Dons' then hosted St Mirren in a midweek match at Pittodrie. Both the goals in the 2–0 win were scored in the last 10 minutes, First defender Andrew Considine finished well after good work by Mark Kerr then Englishman Sone Aluko was put clean-through on goal to score the second. The win propelled Aberdeen up to fourth in the league for the first time. Aberdeen then played Hibernian in their second trip to the capital. The Dons opened the scoring just before half-time when Darren Mackie pounced on Rob Jones' error to head the visitors in front, four minutes before half-time. Aberdeen doubled their lead eight minutes after the break when Sone Aluko flighted in a corner and Zander Diamond headed in his first goal of the season and put the Dons' 2–0 up. Three points turned into one point as Rob Jones made amends for his first half error and pulled one back for Hibs with a header in the 62nd minute, and with virtually the last kick of the game Steven Fletcher scrambled in a goal. Aberdeen then travelled to Glasgow to play Rangers at Ibrox. Aberdeen dominated the first half and it took a good save from Rangers' keeper Allan McGregor to prevent Derek Young from scoring the opening goal. The Dons' continued to hold the upper hand until Jean-Claude Darcheville bundled the ball over the line to put Rangers 1–0 up. Zander Diamond was unlucky not to level when his header was cleared off the line by Pedro Mendes. Seconds later Rangers had the ball in the net again, this time through Kris Boyd. The game finished 2–0 to Rangers. Aberdeen then hosted Motherwell at Pittodrie. Motherwell keeper Graeme Smith pulled off a fantastic save to prevent Darren Mackie from opening the scoring. However, on the hour mark, just seconds after coming on as a second-half substitute Gary McDonald headed the Dons' in front after fine work from Sone Aluko. It was 2–0 eight six minutes later, when Jeffrey de Visscher whipped in a cross, only for Darren Mackie to be hauled down by Motherwell defender Paul Quinn. Referee Chris Boyle showed a red card to Quinn for his last man challenge, and awarded a penalty to the Dons', which Lee Miller happily dispatched. The game finished 2–0 and moved the Dons' up to fifth in the table.

==== December ====
Aberdeen's opening game in December was against Kilmarnock, however the game was postponed due to a frozen pitch at Rugby Park. Next the Dons welcomed Falkirk to Pittodrie. Lee Miller got his fifth and sixth goals of the season in the opening half, of home side dominance. The second half was less great, ex-Aberdeen player Steve Lovell got a late consolation goal, but it was too little too late, as the Dons ran out 2–1 winners. A trip up North to the Caledonian Stadium to play North 'rivals', Inverness C.T. Aberdeen got off to the best of starts when Charlie Mulgrew fired a free-kick passed ex-Don Ryan Esson in only the sixth minute. Gary McDonald doubled the lead when he capitalized on Dougie Imrie's mistake to double the Dons' lead. Five minutes later, Darren Mackie made it three, as he scored his fifth goal of the campaign, with a clinical chip, over the advancing Esson. Aberdeen ran out 3–0 winners leaving them 5th placed in the table. Hearts were visitors to Pittodrie the following week. On form striker Lee Miller scored the only goal of the game in front of a packed Pittodrie. Miller, met Severin's free-kick and scored with a brilliant volley, towards the end of the first half. In a pulsating game, Aberdeen ran out 1–0 winners, and Hearts had Marius Žaliūkas and Lee Wallace sent off. As Aberdeen finished 2008 on a high.

==== January ====
Aberdeen's opening game of 2009 resulted in a disappointing 2–0 defeat away to Hamilton Academical. Simon Mensing converted a penalty to put Hamilton 1–0 up, and Richard Offiong completed the scoring. However, Offiong was later sent off following two bookable offences. On Tuesday 13th, Aberdeen traveled to Ayr, to play December's postponement against Kilmarnock. Killie took the lead when the ball fell nicely to Allan Russell who finished well. Aberdeen equalised on the half-hour, when Lee Miller met Mulgrew's corner fantastically, scoring with a back-heel volley. And it was Miller who grabbed the winner, when he met Mackie's cross with a diving header. Aberdeen won the game 2–1 and that moved Aberdeen up to fourth. Aberdeen were to host both sides of the Old Firm in the space of two weeks, up first were Celtic, a team who Aberdeen have never beaten at Pittodrie since 2002. The game turned out to be a classic. Stuart Duff crossed the ball for Gary McDonald to open the scoring with a looping header. Celtic were back on level terms within a minute, as a cut-back by Aiden McGeady found Scott Brown unmarked to score the equaliser. Duff then got on the score-sheet himself, with a well taken volley. After immense pressure from Celtic in the second half, Scott McDonald pulled Celtic back on level terms again when he headed in Barry Robson's cross. However, Aberdeen were not to be denied the win, as Zander Diamond headed in two Charlie Mulgrew free-kicks in the space of two minutes to give the Dons' a 4–2 win against the reigning champions. The crowd were left chanting for five. The following week, a packed Pittodrie watched Aberdeen take on the second half of the Old Firm, Rangers. A dull game saw very little chances until in the 80th minute Nacho Novo found space at the back post, but his shot rebounded off of the post. Darren Mackie and Charlie Mulgrew went close for Aberdeen, but both defences stayed firm as the sides settled for a 0–0 draw. Aberdeen then travelled to Falkirk. Once again a dull away performance saw Michael Higdon score the only goal as the Bairns' won 1–0.

=== Scottish Cup ===
Aberdeen started their Scottish Cup with a 2–1 win against Second Division side Alloa Athletic. A cool Sone Aluko provided the Dons' with the class they needed to scrape past a spirited Alloa side. On form striker Lee Miller opened the scoring after he deflected Chris Maguire's shot. Alloa midfielder Andy Scott scored from the penalty spot to equalise for the hosts. Aluko raced clear and chipped the ball over the advancing keeper Raymond Jellema in the 56th minute. Alloa pushed forward for much of the last half-hour, but Aberdeen survived to progress. In the fifth-round, Aberdeen were then drawn at home against another Second Division team, East Fife. The game ended in a comfortable 5–0 victory, with the East Fife goalkeeper sent off in the first three minutes. Goals from Tommy Wright, Javan Vidal, Sone Aluko and a late Chris Maguire double sealed the win for Aberdeen, earning them an away tie at Dunfermline Athletic. Sone Aluko looked to have put Aberdeen through to a semi-final when he finished neatly midway through the second half. However Nick Phinn scored with just five minutes remaining, to force a reply at Pittodrie. The replay proved to be a night to forget. A highly disappointing display saw 120 minutes of no goals, and very little activity. Dunfermline eventually won the game on penalties, Scott Severin and Richard Foster were the only players to have missed which sent the Dons' out.

=== Scottish League Cup ===
Aberdeen travelled to Ayr to play Second Division Ayr United in the second round of the League Cup, Chris Maguire scored the only goal of the game after 40 minutes to secure Aberdeen's place in the third round. In the third round of the league cup, Aberdeen were drawn away against fellow SPL club Kilmarnock. The hosts took the lead in the first minute, Conor Sammon opened the scoring only for Gary McDonald to equalise for the visitors. Kilmarnock were back in front five minutes later through David Fernandez, Mehdi Taouil extended the home side's advantage with a penalty. Lee Miller pulled a goal back from the penalty spot, after Darren Mackie was fouled. However, Conor Sammon scored his second of the evening. The match finished 4–2 to Kilmarnock, Aberdeen were out of the League Cup at the third round stage.

== Squad ==
=== First team squad ===
Updated 30 June 2009.

Note: Flags indicate national team as defined under FIFA eligibility rules; some limited exceptions apply. Players may hold more than one non-FIFA nationality.

No.	Pos.	Nation	Player
1	GK	SCO	Jamie Langfield
2	DF	SCO	Charlie Mulgrew
3	MF	SCO	Richard Foster
4	MF	SCO	Gary McDonald
5	DF	SCO	Zander Diamond (vice captain)
6	MF	SCO	Scott Severin (captain)
7	MF	SCO	Jamie Smith
8	MF	SCO	Mark Kerr
9	FW	SCO	Lee Miller
10	FW	SCO	Darren Mackie
11	FW	ENG	Tommy Wright
14	MF	SCO	Derek Young
15	DF	ENG	Javan Vidal (on loan from Manchester City)
16	MF	SCO	Stuart Duff

No.	Pos.	Nation	Player
18	DF	SCO	Lee Mair
19	FW	SCO	Chris Maguire
20	GK	FRA	Bertrand Bossu
21	DF	SCO	Andrew Considine
22	MF	ENG	Sone Aluko
23	MF	NIR	Sammy Stewart
24	FW	SCO	Michael Paton
26	MF	SCO	Peter Pawlett
27	DF	SCO	Jonathan Crawford
28	DF	SCO	Stirling Smith
29	MF	SCO	Nicky Clark
30	GK	ENG	John Bateman
32	DF	SCO	Scott Ross
33	DF	FRO	Rogvi Holm

== Transfers ==
=== Summer Transfer Window (1 July – 1 September 2008) ===
In Permanent

Player	From	Fee	Contract length
(Scotland) Gary McDonald	(England) Oldham Athletic	Free	Two years
(France) Bertrand Bossu	(England) Walsall	Free	Two years
(Northern Ireland) Sammy Stewart	(Northern Ireland) Glenavon	Free	Two years
(Scotland) Mark Kerr	(Scotland) Dundee United	Free	Two years
(Scotland) Charlie Mulgrew	(England) Wolverhampton Wanderers	£80,000	Two years
(England) Tommy Wright	(England) Darlington	£100,000	Three years
(England) Sone Aluko	(England) Birmingham City	Undisclosed	Three years

Loans in

Player	From	Loan Length
(England) Jared Hodgkiss	(England) West Bromwich Albion	6 Months

Out Permanent

Player	To	Fee	Note
(Scotland) Barry Nicholson	(England) Preston North End	Free	Bosman
(Scotland) Derek Soutar	(Scotland) Ross County	Free	Bosman
(Scotland) Greg Kelly	(Scotland) St Johnstone	Free	Bosman
(Republic of Ireland) Richie Byrne	(England) Oldham Athletic	Free	Bosman
(Netherlands) Dave Bus	(Netherlands) Go Ahead Eagles	Free	Bosman
(England) Jonathan Smith			End of contract
(England) Steve Lovell	(Scotland) Falkirk	Free	Bosman
(England) Sone Aluko	(England) Birmingham City	—	End of loan
(England) Josh Walker	(England) Middlesbrough	—	End of loan
(Republic of Ireland) Alan Maybury	(England) Leicester City	—	End of loan
(Scotland) Jackie McNamara	(Scotland) Falkirk	Free	Bosman
(Netherlands) Karim Touzani	(Netherlands) Sparta Rotterdam	Free	
(Scotland) Martin Skinner	(Scotland) Peterhead	Free	Bosman
(Scotland) Neil McVitie	(Scotland) Peterhead	Free	Bosman
(Scotland) Davie Ross	(Scotland) Peterhead	Free	Bosman

=== Winter Transfer Window (1 January – 2 February 2009) ===
Loans in

Player	From	Loan Length
(England) Javan Vidal	(England) Manchester City	6 Months

Out Permanent

Player	To	Fee
(Netherlands) Jeffrey de Visscher	(Netherlands) SC Cambuur	Undisclosed
(Scotland) Stuart Smith	(Scotland) Peterhead	Undisclosed

== Statistics ==
=== Appearances & Goals ===
No.	Pos	Nat	Player	Total		SPL		Scottish Cup		League Cup	
No.	Pos	Nat	Player	Apps	Goals	Apps	Goals	Apps	Goals	Apps	Goals
1	GK	(Scotland) SCO	Jamie Langfield	42	0	38	0	4	0	0	0
2	DF	(Scotland) SCO	Charlie Mulgrew	41	5	35	5	4	0	2	0
3	MF	(Scotland) SCO	Richard Foster	39	1	34	0	3	1	2	0
4	MF	(Scotland) SCO	Gary McDonald	31	6	28	5	1	0	2	1
5	DF	(Scotland) SCO	Zander Diamond	32	4	28	4	3	0	1	0
6	MF	(Scotland) SCO	Scott Severin	42	1	37	1	4	0	1	0
7	MF	(Scotland) SCO	Jamie Smith	15	0	12	0	2	0	1	0
8	MF	(Scotland) SCO	Mark Kerr	38	0	32	0	4	0	2	0
9	FW	(Scotland) SCO	Lee Miller	37	12	34	10	2	1	1	1
10	FW	(Scotland) SCO	Darren Mackie	32	6	28	6	2	0	2	0
11	FW	(England) ENG	Tommy Wright	19	2	15	1	3	1	1	0
14	MF	(Scotland) SCO	Derek Young	26	1	22	1	2	0	2	0
15	DF	(England) ENG	Javan Vidal	14	1	13	0	1	1	0	0
16	MF	(Scotland) SCO	Stuart Duff	22	1	20	1	2	0	0	0
17	MF	(Netherlands) NED	Jeffrey de Visscher	12	0	10	0	1	0	1	0
18	DF	(Scotland) SCO	Lee Mair	29	0	24	0	3	0	2	0
19	FW	(Scotland) SCO	Chris Maguire	35	6	31	3	3	2	1	1
20	GK	(France) FRA	Bertrand Bossu	3	0	1	0	0	0	2	0
21	DF	(Scotland) SCO	Andrew Considine	23	1	20	1	2	0	1	0
22	MF	(Nigeria) NGA	Sone Aluko	33	6	28	4	4	2	1	0
23	MF	(Northern Ireland) NIR	Sammy Stewart	1	0	1	0	0	0	0	0
24	FW	(Scotland) SCO	Michael Paton	5	1	4	1	1	0	0	0
26	MF	(Scotland) SCO	Peter Pawlett	6	0	5	0	1	0	0	0
	DF	(England) ENG	Jared Hodgkiss	8	0	7	0	0	0	1	0

Source: Soccerbase

=== Disciplinary record ===
No.	Nat.	Player	Yellow card	Second yellow card	Red card	Total Bookings
1.	(Scotland)	Jamie Langfield	0	0	0	0
2.	(Scotland)	Charlie Mulgrew	2	0	2	4
3.	(Scotland)	Richard Foster	4	0	0	4
4.	(Scotland)	Gary McDonald	3	0	0	3
5.	(Scotland)	Zander Diamond	6	0	0	6
6.	(Scotland)	Scott Severin	4	0	0	4
7.	(Scotland)	Jamie Smith	0	0	0	0
8.	(Scotland)	Mark Kerr	6	1	1	9
9.	(Scotland)	Lee Miller	8	0	0	8
10.	(Scotland)	Darren Mackie	4	0	0	4
11.	(England)	Tommy Wright	2	0	0	2
14.	(Scotland)	Derek Young	1	0	0	1
15.	(England)	Javan Vidal	0	0	0	0
16.	(Scotland)	Stuart Duff	0	0	0	0
17.	(Netherlands)	Jeffrey de Visscher	1	0	0	1
18.	(Scotland)	Lee Mair	4	0	0	4
19.	(Scotland)	Chris Maguire	3	0	0	3
20.	(France)	Bertrand Bossu	0	0	0	0
21.	(Scotland)	Andrew Considine	7	0	0	7
22.	(Nigeria)	Sone Aluko	3	0	0	3
23.	(Northern Ireland)	Sammy Stewart	0	0	0	0
24.	(Scotland)	Michael Paton	0	0	0	0
26.	(Scotland)	Peter Pawlett	1	0	0	1

Source: BBC Sport

=== Captains ===
Rank	Player	No. games
1	(Scotland) Scott Severin	41
2	(Scotland) Jamie Smith	2

Source: BBC match reports

=== Most Appearances ===
Rank	Player	SPL	SC	LC	Total
1	(Scotland) Jamie Langfield	38	4	0	42
2	(Scotland) Scott Severin	37	4	1	42
3	(Scotland) Richard Foster	34	3	2	39
4	(Scotland) Mark Kerr	32	4	2	38
5	(Scotland) Lee Miller	34	2	1	31

Source: above appearances and goals table

=== Top scorers ===
Rank	Player	SPL	SC	LC	Total
1	(Scotland) Lee Miller	10	1	1	12
2	(Scotland) Darren Mackie	6	0	0	6
3	(Scotland) Gary McDonald	5	0	1	6
4	(Nigeria) Sone Aluko	4	2	0	6
5	(Scotland) Chris Maguire	3	2	1	6

Source: above appearances and goals table

=== Awards ===
==== Clydesdale Bank Awards ====
Month	Recipient	Award	Report
November	(Nigeria) Sone Aluko	Young Player of the Month	BBC Sport
December	(Scotland) Lee Miller	Player of the Month	BBC Sport

== Results and fixtures ==
=== Pre-season friendlies ===
Date	Opponent	H/A	Score	Aberdeen Scorer(s)	Attendance	Report
12 July	(England) Manchester United	H	0–2		20,555	AFC
15 July	Dundee	A	0–0		2,422	AFC
18 July	Peterhead	A	0–4		3,241	AFC
21 July	Brechin City	A	1–0	Young (42)	1,589	AFC
24 July	(Netherlands) DZC 68	A	5–0	Maguire (13, 22, 39), Miller (43), J. Smith (75)	342	AFC
27 July	(Netherlands) FC Zwolle	A	1–2	McDonald (54)	2,964	AFC
30 July	(Netherlands) Vitesse Arnhem	A	1–0	Considine (70)	4,103	AFC
31 July	(Netherlands) SV Rietvogels	A	10–0	Severin (2), Pawlett (6), Camero (36, 49, 61, 65), de Visscher (40), Maguire (46, 58), Paton (73)	467	AFC
5 August	Inverurie Loco Works	A	2–0	Paton (17), Stewart (79)	2,300	AFC

=== Scottish Premier League ===
Match Day	Date	Opponent	H/A	Score	Aberdeen Scorer(s)	League Position	Attendance	Report
1	9 August	Inverness CT	H	0–2		12	12,659	BBC Sport
2	16 August	Motherwell	A	1–0	Mulgrew (86)	8	5,872	BBC Sport
3	23 August	Rangers	H	1–1	Young (45+1)	8	16,849	BBC Sport
4	30 August	St Mirren	A	1–0	Mackie (42)	6	4,680	BBC Sport
5	13 September	Hamilton Academical	H	1–2	McDonald (7)	8	10,865	BBC Sport
6	20 September	Dundee United	H	0–1		8	11,041	BBC Sport
7	27 September	Celtic	A	2–3	Mulgrew (56, 65)	11	58,565	BBC Sport
8	4 October	Hibernian	H	1–2	Miller (42 pen.)	12	10,793	BBC Sport
9	18 October	Falkirk	A	1–0	Miller (48)	10	5,662	BBC Sport
10	25 October	Heart of Midlothian	A	1–1	Mackie (13)	8	14,265	BBC Sport
11	1 November	Kilmarnock	H	1–0	Aluko (50)	7	10,599	BBC Sport
12	8 November	Dundee United	A	1–2	Mackie (66)	8	9,490	BBC Sport
13	11 November	St Mirren	H	2–0	Considine (80), Aluko (89)	4	9,452	BBC Sport
14	15 November	Hibernian	A	2–2	Mackie (40), Diamond (53)	6	11,640	BBC Sport
15	22 November	Rangers	A	0–2		7	50,166	BBC Sport
16	29 November	Motherwell	H	2–0	McDonald (61), Miller (67 pen.)	5	10,302	BBC Sport
17	13 December	Falkirk	H	2–1	Miller (16 pen., 42)	6	8,909	BBC Sport
18	20 December	Inverness CT	A	3–0	Mulgrew (6), McDonald (51), Mackie (56)	5	5,862	BBC Sport
19	27 December	Heart of Midlothian	H	1–0	Miller (36)	5	18,021	BBC Sport
20	3 January	Hamilton Academical	A	0–2		5	4,334	BBC Sport
21	13 January	Kilmarnock	A	2–1	Miller (30), (59)	4	4,354	BBC Sport
22	18 January	Celtic	H	4–2	McDonald (24), Duff (31), Diamond (75), (78)	3	18,100	BBC Sport
23	24 January	Rangers	H	0–0		5	20,441	BBC Sport
24	31 January	Falkirk	A	0–1		5	5,605	BBC Sport
25	14 February	Heart of Midlothian	A	1–2	Mackie (20)	5	15,049	BBC Sport
26	21 February	Dundee United	H	2–2	Severin (46), Diamond (72)	5	14,673	BBC Sport
27	28 February	Kilmarnock	H	0–0		5	11,457	BBC Sport
28	3 March	St Mirren	A	1–1	Wright (90)	5	4,383	BBC Sport
29	14 March	Hamilton Academical	H	1–0	Maguire (28)	4	10,312	BBC Sport
30	21 March	Hibernian	A	0–0		4	11,754	BBC Sport
31	4 April	Motherwell	A	1–1	Maguire (67)	4	4,686	BBC Sport
32	11 April	Inverness CT	H	1–0	McDonald (79)	4	11,114	BBC Sport
33	18 April	Celtic	A	0–2		5	58,581	BBC Sport
34	2 May	Celtic	H	1–3	Maguire (22)	5	14,752	BBC Sport
35	7 May	Dundee United	A	1–1	Miller (33)	5	10,407	BBC Sport
36	13 May	Heart of Midlothian	H	0–0		5	11,588	BBC Sport
37	16 May	Rangers	A	1–2	Paton (77)	5	50,295	BBC Sport
38	24 May	Hibernian	H	2–1	Miller (13), Mulgrew (45)	4	14,083	BBC Sport

=== Scottish League Cup ===
Round	Date	Opponent	H/A	Score	Aberdeen Scorer(s)	Attendance	Report
2	27 August	Ayr United	A	1–0	Maguire (40)	2,979	BBC Sport
3	23 September	Kilmarnock	A	2–4	McDonald (5), Miller (25 pen.)	4,339	BBC Sport

=== Scottish Cup ===
Round	Date	Opponent	H/A	Score	Aberdeen Scorer(s)	Attendance	Report
4	10 January	Alloa Athletic	A	2–1	Miller (9), Aluko (16)	3,012	BBC Sport
5	17 February	East Fife	H	5–0	Wright (11), Vidal (16), McDonald (29 o.g.), Maguire (82, 84)	8,960	BBC Sport
QF	7 March	Dunfermline Athletic	A	1–1	Aluko (61)	9,696	BBC Sport
QF (R)	17 March	Dunfermline Athletic	H	0–0 (a.e.t.) (2–4 pen.)		13,567	BBC Sport

== Competitions ==
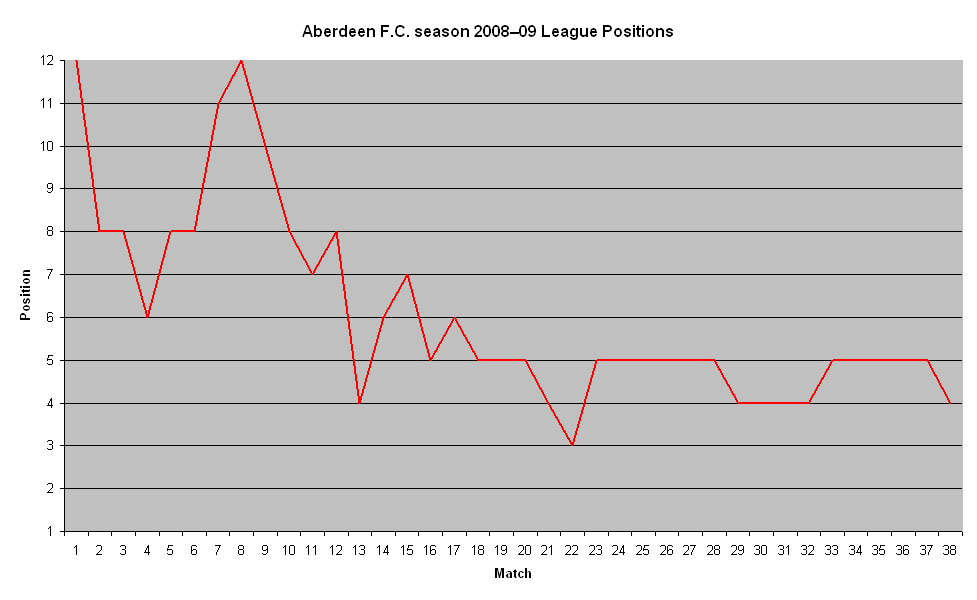
Aberdeen's League positions

=== Overall ===
Competition	Started round	Final position / round	First match	Last match
Scottish Premier League	—	4	9 August 2008	24 May 2009
League Cup	2nd Round	3rd Round	20 August 2008	24 September 2008
Scottish Cup	4th Round	Quarter-finals	10 January 2009	17 March 2009

Source: Competitions

=== SPL ===
==== Classification ====
Pos	Team	Pld	W	D	L	GF	GA	GD	Pts	Qualification or relegation (Note: Teams played each other three times (33 matches), before the league split into two groups (the top six and the bottom six) for the last five matches.)
2	Celtic	38	24	10	4	80	33	+47	82	Qualification for the Champions League third qualifying round
3	Heart of Midlothian	38	16	11	11	40	37	+3	59	Qualification for the Europa League play-off round
4	Aberdeen	38	14	11	13	41	40	+1	53	Qualification for the Europa League third qualifying round
5	Dundee United	38	13	14	11	47	50	−3	53	
6	Hibernian	38	11	14	13	42	46	−4	47	

Source: Scottish Professional Football League
Rules for classification: 1) Points; 2) Goal difference; 3) Goals scored

==== Results summary ====
Overall								Home						Away					
Pld	W	D	L	GF	GA	GD	Pts	W	D	L	GF	GA	GD	W	D	L	GF	GA	GD
38	14	11	13	41	40	+1	53	9	5	5	22	17	+5	5	6	8	19	23	−4

Source: BBC Sport

==== Results by round ====
Round	1	2	3	4	5	6	7	8	9	10	11	12	13	14	15	16	17	18	19	20	21	22	23	24	25	26	27	28	29	30	31	32	33	34	35	36	37	38
Ground	H	A	H	A	H	H	A	H	A	A	H	A	H	A	A	H	H	A	H	A	A	H	H	A	A	H	H	A	H	A	A	H	A	H	A	H	A	H
Result	L	W	D	W	L	L	L	L	W	D	W	L	W	D	L	W	W	W	W	L	W	W	D	L	L	D	D	D	W	D	D	W	L	L	D	D	L	W
Position	12	8	8	6	8	8	11	12	10	8	7	8	4	6	7	5	6	5	5	5	4	3	5	5	5	5	5	5	4	4	4	4	5	5	5	5	5	4

Source: BBC Sport
A = Away; H = Home; W = Win; D = Draw; L = Loss

==== Results by opponent ====
Team	Results				Points
Team	1	2	3	4	Points
Celtic	2–3	4–2	0–2	1–3	3
Dundee United	0–1	1–2	2–2	1–1	2
Heart of Midlothian	1–1	1–0	1–2	0–0	5
Hibernian	1–2	2–2	0–0	2–1	5
Rangers	1–1	0–2	0–0	1–2	2
Falkirk	1–0	2–1	0–1		6
Hamilton Academical	1–2	0–2	1–0		3
Inverness CT	0–2	3–0	1–0		6
Kilmarnock	1–0	2–1	0–0		7
Motherwell	1–0	2–0	1–1		7
St Mirren	1–0	2–0	1–1		7

Source: 2008–09 Scottish Premier League article

== Club ==
=== Management ===
Position	Staff
Manager	(Scotland) Jimmy Calderwood
Assistant manager	(Northern Ireland) Jimmy Nicholl
Striker coach	(Scotland) Sandy Clark
Goalkeeping coach	(Scotland) Jim Leighton

Source: afc.co.uk

=== Other information ===
Chairman	(Scotland) Stewart Milne
Managing Director	(Scotland) Duncan Fraser
Executive Director	(Scotland) Willie Miller
Ground (capacity and dimensions)	Pittodrie Stadium (22,199 / 109x72 yards)

Source: afc.co.uk

=== Team kit ===
Supplier: Nike
Sponsor(s): Team Recruitment

Home	Away

== See also ==
- List of Aberdeen F.C. seasons
