= Jamie Langfield =

Scottish footballer (born 1979)

Personal information
- Full name: James Robert Langfield
- Date of birth: 22 December 1979 (age 46)
- Place of birth: Paisley, Scotland
- Position: Goalkeeper

Team information
- Current team: St Mirren (goalkeeping coach)

Senior career*
Years	Team	Apps	(Gls)
1996–2003	Dundee	33	(0)
2003–2004	Raith Rovers	5	(0)
2004	Partick Thistle	10	(0)
2004–2005	Dunfermline Athletic	0	(0)
2005–2015	Aberdeen	278	(0)
2011	→ Forfar Athletic (loan)	2	(0)
2015–2021	St Mirren	43	(0)
Total		371	(0)

International career
2007	Scotland B	1	(0)
- * Club domestic league appearances and goals

James Robert Langfield (born 22 December 1979) is a Scottish football player and coach, who is currently the goalkeeping coach at St Mirren. Langfield, who played as a goalkeeper, started his career with Dundee. He then played for Partick Thistle and Dunfermline Athletic before joining Aberdeen in 2005. He went on to spend the next decade with Aberdeen, regaining his place in the team after being dropped for off-field indiscipline in 2007, a loss of form in 2008 and then again in 2012 after suffering a brain seizure that kept him out of competitive action for nine months. He was voted the Aberdeen player of the year in 2009 and was part of the team that won the Scottish League Cup in 2014.

Langfield played for Scotland in a B international in 2007 and was a member of the senior squad without being selected for a full cap. In 2015 Langfield joined hometown club St Mirren and played regularly until May 2017 before becoming their goalkeeping coach. Langfield was caretaker manager of St Mirren after Jim Goodwin left the club in February 2022.

== Career ==
=== Dundee ===
Born in Paisley, Langfield started his football career as a youth player at Dundee, having been signed by Jim Duffy at sixteen years old. After progressing through the club’s youth system, he was called up to the first team by manager Jim Duffy as an unused substitute following an injury of Billy Thomson and Gary McGlynn, in a 2–1 win against Dumbarton in a Scottish League Cup match on 13 August 1996. On 17 October 1998, Langfield made his professional debut for Dundee, coming on as a 59th-minute substitute for the injured Rab Douglas, in a 2–2 draw against Aberdeen. A month later on 19 November 1998, he made his first start for the club and played the whole game, in a 1–1 draw against Kilmarnock. Langfield went on to make two appearances in the 1998–99 season. In March 1999, he signed his first professional contract with Dundee.

The 1999–00 season continued to see Langfield as Dundee’s second choice goalkeeper behind Douglas. On 15 February 2000, he made his first appearance of the season against Ayr United in third round replay of the Scottish Cup and played all the way to a 1–1 draw, as the club loss 7–6 in a penalty shootout. In a follow–up match, Langfield made his first league appearance of the season, in a 3–1 loss against Aberdeen. Manager Scott acknowledged his performance, saying: "Jamie Langfield has done well for us and the defeat by Aberdeen was certainly not down to him in any way." At the end of the 1999–00 season, he made two appearances in all competitions.

Following the departure of Rab Douglas, Langfield found himself competing for the first-choice goalkeeper role with Marco Roccati for the 2000–01 season. On 21 October 2000, he made his first appearance of the season, in a 2–1 loss against Motherwell. On 2 January 2001, Langfield made his second appearance of the season, coming on as a 75th-minute substitute, in a 3–0 loss against Hibernian. However, prior to the match against Celtic on 4 April 2001, Roccati suffered an injury while warming up, prompting to put on Langfield, as Dundee went on to lose 2–0. In a follow–up match, he kept his first clean sheet in his professional career, in a 2–0 win against Aberdeen. Following this, Langfield was the club’s first-choice goalkeeper for the rest of the 2000–01 season. He then kept another clean sheet for Dundee, in a 2–0 win against Celtic on 13 May 2001. At the end of the 2000–01 season, Langfield made nine appearances in all competitions.

Ahead of the 2001–02 season, Langfield signed a three-year contract extension with Dundee. He continued to be the club’s first-choice goalkeeper, beating ahead of Julián Speroni, Paul Mathers and Derek Soutar. Langfield made his European debut, starting the whole game, in a 0–0 draw against Smederevo 1924 in the first leg of the UEFA Intertoto Cup’s first round. However in the return leg, Dundee went on to lose 5–2 and was eliminated from the tournament. In the opening game of the season against local rivals, Dundee United, he gave away a penalty and was booked in the 20th minute, but saved a penalty from Charlie Miller, as the club drew 2–2. Langfield was instrumental in a 1–0 win against Livingston on 13 August 2001 when he made saves to keep a clean sheet. His performance saw him linked with a move to Rangers but the move never materialised. However in a match against Motherwell on 31 October 2001, he made a mistake that led to Karl Ready "to guide his back-post header into the net off the underside of the bar", as Dundee won 3–1. Langfield kept a clean sheet on 1 December 2001 and 8 December 2001 against Rangers and St Johnstone respectively. However, he continued to make mistakes in the club’s defeat in the next three league matches. Langfield acknowledged his mistake, saying: "I have had my ups and downs this season. I admit that I was making the odd mistake, but did not at any time feel that my overall game gave cause for concern." He was soon dropped as Dundee’s first-choice goalkeeper in favour of Speroni and never played for the rest of the 2001–02 season and eventually for the club again. Despite this, Langfield made twenty–three appearances in all competitions.

The next two seasons saw Langfield remain as the Dundee’s second choice goalkeeper behind Speroni. He appeared as an unused substitute in the Scottish Cup final, losing 3–0 against Rangers. Langfield was released by Dundee when the club went into administration. He made thirty–eight appearances in all competitions.

==== Short terms spell with Scottish clubs ====
Shortly after leaving Dundee, Langfield signed a short term deal with Raith Rovers. He made his debut for the club, starting the whole game, in a 4–1 loss against St Johnstone on 29 November 2003. Langfield started all five matches for Raith Rovers and kept two clean sheets along the way.

On 15 January 2004, Langfield left Raith Rovers to join Partick Thistle until the end of the 2003–04 season. Two days later on 17 January 2004, he made his debut for the club, starting the whole game, in a 2–1 loss against his former club, Dundee. After making another appearance, Langfield was dropped for the next five matches. On 9 March 2004, he made his return from injury, starting the whole game and kept a clean sheet, in a 0–0 draw against Aberdeen. Following this, Langfield regained his first-choice goalkeeper role at Partick Thistle for the next seven matches. After being dropped from the squad, the club was relegated to the Scottish Football League First Division. At the end of the 2003–04 season, he made ten appearances in all competitions.

His performance attracted interests from Dunfermline Athletic. On 12 May 2004, Langfield signed for Dunfermline Athletic on a free transfer. However, he remained as the club’s second choice goalkeeper behind Derek Stillie throughout the 2004–05 season. Langfield made no appearances for Dunfermline Athletic.

=== Aberdeen ===
In the January transfer window of 2005, Langfield was linked with a move to Aberdeen despite Dunfermline Athletic keen on keeping him by offering a two–year contract. On 21 June 2005, he officially signed for Aberdeen on a three–year contract. Upon joining the club, Langfield said: "I'm just here to work hard and hopefully I'll push Ryan all the way. I anticipate a big year for the club. We're moving in the right direction after last year's great season and the manager has made some good signings."

==== 2005–06 season ====
At the start of the 2005–06 season, Langfield was the second-choice goalkeeper behind Ryan Esson. On 23 August 2005, he made his Aberdeen debut in the second round of the Scottish League Cup, and kept his first clean sheet for the club in a 3–0 win against Berwick Rangers. On 8 November 2005, Langfield made his second appearance for Aberdeen, in a 1–0 loss against Motherwell in the quarter-finals of the Scottish League Cup. However, Esson soon was replaced by Langfield for the match against Dunfermline Athletic and kept his first league clean sheet for the club, in a 0–0 draw on 10 December 2005. He kept another clean sheet in a follow–up match against Livingston.

As a result, Langfield soon took over from Esson as first-choice for Aberdeen. In a match against Hibernian on 14 January 2006, he produced two saves from Garry O'Connor and Scott Brown in the first-half, in a 2–1 win. In a match against Rangers on 15 April 2006, Langfield produced a number of saves and was named Man of the Match by The Herald. At the end of the 2005–06 season, he made twenty–three appearances in all competitions.

==== 2006–07 season ====
Following the departure of Esson, Langfield regained his first-choice goalkeeper at Aberdeen. In a match against Inverness Caledonian Thistle on 5 August 2006, he was at fault for misjudging the ball, leading to Barry Wilson scoring a late equaliser, in a 1–1 draw. After the match, the club’s manager Jimmy Calderwood said about Langfield’s error: "Football is a cruel game and maybe some people will give Jamie stick for not holding on to the ball. He caught it and I don't know if on the way down it has come off somebody or if he was fouled because there was blood coming from his face."

In a follow–up match against Motherwell, Langfield made amends for his error by keeping a clean sheet, in a 2–0 win. In the third round of the Scottish Cup against Hibernian, he was at fault for the opening goal from Ivan Sproule, in a 2–2 draw, leading to a replay. However in a replay match, Aberdeen went on to lose 4–1. In a follow–up match against St Mirren, Langfield made amends for his performance when he saved a penalty from Richard Brittain and went on to kept a clean sheet, in a 2–0 win. As the season progressed, he said the club set their target by finishing third place in the league and qualify for the UEFA Cup next season.

In a match against Motherwell on 13 March 2007, he produced a number of saves to keep a clean sheet and was named Man of the Match, in a 2–0 win. Langfield’s target of finishing third and qualifying for the UEFA Cup was fulfilled when he kept a clean sheet, in a 2–0 win against Rangers. At the end of the 2006–07 season, he made forty appearances in all competitions. Shortly after the end of the season, Rangers renewed their interests in signing Langfield, seeing him as a second–choice goalkeeper to Allan McGregor, but he rejected a move to Rangers, preferring the option of more first-team opportunities at Aberdeen.

==== 2007–08 season ====
In June 2007, while enjoying his stag party on holiday in Magaluf, he had a drunken argument with Aberdeen manager Jimmy Calderwood after bumping into him in a chance encounter, with the incident putting his future at Aberdeen in doubt. Langfield himself stated he wasn't able to remember what happened as he was so drunk. The club later confirmed that they had made him available for transfer with an asking price of £100,000. At the start of the 2007–08 season, Langfield was dropped to the substitute bench with Derek Soutar made first choice, Along the way, his relationship with the Dons’ supporters was strained, as they turned on him.

Having been on the bench for the season's first six matches, Langfield made his first appearance against Ukrainian side Dnipro Dnipropetrovsk in the UEFA Cup and kept a clean sheet in a 0–0 draw. After the match, he said: "It's great to be back in the first team and it's great to be back in the manager's plans. A lot has been written about me but the manager told me when we came back after the summer that if I worked hard and got my act together I would get my chance. He made it clear I hadn't played my last game for Aberdeen. I have got my chance and hopefully I repaid the manager a little bit." In the return leg, he started as a keeper and helped the club go through to the group stage after a 1–1 draw in the second leg, which resulted in a victory on away goals. After the match, manager Calderwood and The Herald both praised his performance. Following this, Langfield resumed his duties as the club’s first-choice goalkeeper.

His return also led to him open talks with a new contract with Aberdeen. Prior to the match against Inverness Caledonian Thistle on 22 October 2007, he suffered an illness but was named in the starting eleven and helped the club win 2–1. In a match against Lokomotiv Moscow on 9 November 2007, Langfield produced saves from Dmitri Sychev and Peter Odemwingie to help Aberdeen earn their first point in the UEFA Cup group stage, in a 1–1 draw. On 20 December 2007, he kept a clean sheet to help the club beat FC Copenhagen 4–0 to advance to the knockout stage of the UEFA Cup. The next day on 21 December 2007, Langfield signed a three-year extension to his contract to keep him at Aberdeen until 2011. He kept three consecutive clean sheets in the league between 29 December 2007 and 5 January 2008. Langfield experienced a drop in form when he conceded twenty–two goals in the first two months of 2008, including two occasions against Dundee United (both in the league and CIS Insurance Cup) and both legs against Bayern Munich in the UEFA Cup (though Langfield saved a penalty from Hamit Altıntop in the first leg). On 10 February 2008, Langfield conceded five goals despite making a string of good saves, in a 5–1 loss against Celtic. After the match, manager Gordon Strachan defended his performance, saying: "The man of the match was their keeper. He had some very good saves, especially in the second half when we were making so many good chances."

As a result, Langfield was dropped as a first-choice at the club in favour of Derek Soutar and was on the bench for seven matches. On 19 April 2008, he made return to the starting line–up, in a 1–0 loss against Celtic. On the last game of the season against Rangers, Langfield kept a clean sheet, in a 1–0 win. At the end of the 2007–08 season, he made thirty–nine appearances in all competitions.

==== 2008–09 season ====
In the 2008–09 season, Langfield was chosen as Aberdeen’s first-choice goalkeeper ahead of Bertrand Bossu. In a match against Motherwell on 16 August 2008, he produced good saves, including a header from Paul Quinn and helped the club kept a clean sheet, in a 1–0 win. Two weeks later on 30 August 2008, Langfield produced another good saves, including a 25-yard strike from Franco Miranda and kept another clean sheet, in a 1–0 win. Reflecting on regaining his first-choice goalkeeper role at Aberdeen, he said: "I reassessed myself. Now I want to go out in every game and prove myself to those who think I shouldn't be in the team. "There are always going to be doubters but I believe I deserve to be No.1 here and I want to be in that position for the duration of my contract. I used to beat myself up about the goals I lost and it was still in my head the following Saturday. Now it's forgotten about. If I lose a goal then that's it, there's nothing I can do about it. I concentrate totally on my next performance. I need to be consistent rather than brilliant but I have matured as a player and a person. People say goalkeepers mature later and hopefully that applies to me."

Langfield reiterated on targeting a place in the UEFA Europa League next season. On 18 January 2009, he produced good saves, including one from Georgios Samaras’s close range and helped the club, in a 4–2 win against Celtic. In a follow–up match against Rangers, Langfield collided with Kenny Miller in the 52nd minute, causing him to be concussed and was replaced by Bossu, as the match ended in a 0–0 draw. But he quickly recovered and returned to the starting line–up, in a 1–0 loss against Falkirk on 31 January 2009. In a match against Motherwell on 4 April 2009, Langfield produced good saves, including a last minute save from Brian McLean, as the match ended in a 1–1 draw. In a match against Rangers on 16 May 2009, he was lunged by Madjid Bougherra when the pair chased for the ball, resulting in the opposition player sent–off in the 40th minute, as Aberdeen went on to lose 2–1. On the last game of the season against Hibernian, Langfield helped the club win 2–1, fulfilling his target of helping the club play in the UEFA Europa League next season.

At the end of the 2008–09 season, Langfield was ever-present in the league and went on to make forty–two appearances in all competitions. For his performance, he was named Aberdeen’s Player of the Year. Langfield’s performance also attracted interests from England, but the player stated that he was happy to stay at the club. When Jimmy Calderwood left Aberdeen at the end of that season, he claimed Langfield was also looking to leave, but the player pledged his commitment to the club.

==== 2009–10 season ====
At the start of the 2009–10 season, Langfield played in both legs of the UEFA Europa League third qualifying round against Sigma Olomouc, as Aberdeen loss 8–1 on aggregate and was eliminated from the tournament (though he saved a penalty . He continued to remain as the club’s first-choice goalkeeper despite the arrival of Stuart Nelson. In a follow–up match, Langfield kept five consecutive clean sheets in the league between 22 August 2009 and 26 September 2009, including one against Rangers. In a follow–up match against Kilmarnock, his going of five league games without conceding a goal came to an end when he conceded a goal from Danny Invincibile and despite making good saves, including a free kicks from Jamie Hamill and Garry Hay, the match ended in a 1–1 draw.

During a match against Motherwell on 21 November 2009, Langfield suffered a leg injury but he "was able to continue after treatment although he wasn’t moving freely, as the match ended in a 1–1 draw". In a follow–up match against Rangers, he made vital saves from Kris Boyd and Lee McCulloch and kept a clean sheet, in a 1–0 win. Since the start of the 2009–10 season, Langfield played in every league matches until he missed one match due to an illness. On 27 February 2010, he returned to the starting line–up, in a 1–0 loss against Hearts. In a match against St Johnstone on 11 April 2010, Langfield made two mistakes when he allowed two goals from Kenny Deuchar and Cillian Sheridan, as Aberdeen loss 3–1. In a follow–up match against Falkirk, Langfield made amends for his mistake when he kept a clean sheet, in a 1–0 win.

After the match, Langfield said about the 2009–10 season: "For people on the outside to comment about team spirit shows they don't know the guys in the dressing room. Every single one of us get on. I don't know where these stories come from. The biggest factor that has affected performances is that we have been lacking confidence. When we have gone behind we have found it really hard to get back into the match. It was a disciplined display that is something which has not happened recently. It was a massive result that will give us a platform to have some good performances between now and the end of the season." At the end of the 2009–10 season, he made forty–one appearances in all competitions.

==== 2010–11 season ====
Ahead of the 2010–11 season, Langfield injured himself by spilling boiling water on his foot and missed the start of the season as a result. On 18 September 2010, he made his return from injury, starting the whole game, in a 1–1 draw against Motherwell. After the match, Langfield said he’s happy to make his return from injury, but described the injury as "a freak accident and it was bloody painful." Since returning from injury, Langfield regained his first-choice goalkeeper status from Mark Howard despite making mistakes along the way.

On 6 November 2010, Langfield returned to the starting line–up against Celtic, which he conceded nine goals, in a 9–0 loss, which holds the record not only as the biggest ever win in the SPL, but also the biggest ever defeat in Aberdeen's history. After the match, Langfield commented that he would be remembered as a keeper who conceded nine goals for the rest of his career. A week later on 13 November 2010 against Rangers, Langfield saved a penalty from Kenny Miller, as the club loss 2–0. In a match against Hearts on 11 December 2010, he conceded five goals, in a 5–0 loss. On 15 January 2011, Langfield played his 200th match in his Aberdeen career in a 2–0 win over St Mirren. In a follow–up match against Celtic, he suffered a broken finger while warming up but nevertheless played the whole game, as the club loss 1–0. Langfield kept four consecutive clean sheets in the league between 19 February 2011 and 2 March 2011. In the semi–finals of the Scottish Cup against Celtic, Langfield saved a penalty from Anthony Stokes but Aberdeen went on to lose 4–0, denying their hopes of reaching the final. At the end of the 2010–11 season, he went on to make thirty–eight appearances in all competitions.

Throughout the 2010–11 season, Langfied’s future at Aberdeen was in doubt, with his contract was set to expire once the season has been concluded. There are setbacks for the club to keep him, as Langfield was told by the Aberdeen’s management that he had to take a pay-cut if he were to stay at the club, having been amongst three of the Dons' highest-paid players. In April 2011, Aberdeen began talks with Langfield over a new contract. On 14 May 2011, he signed a one-year contract extension with the club, ending the speculation over his future.

==== 2011–12 season and Loan to Forfar Athletic ====
Shortly after the end of the 2011–12 season, Langfield suffered a brain seizure and was taken to hospital in Glasgow. Two days later, he was released from hospital as he continued his recovery. Aberdeen manager Craig Brown said he would allow Langfield to decide when he would resume playing and said he would not be back in action until he was 100 per cent recovered. It was expected that Langfield would return to training by September. Following his return, Brown stated he was considering letting Langfield join a club on loan, describing it as "a bit premature to be thinking about putting him into the first team". Langfield admitted he thought the seizure could have ended his career but that he believed it could make him a better keeper, and he would be taking medication in case of another seizure. On 31 October 2011, Langfield made his return for Aberdeen’s reserve team, in a 5–1 win against Dundee United.

On 29 November 2011, Langfield was loaned to Forfar Athletic for a month to gain some match practice. He made his debut for the club, starting the whole game, in a 1–1 draw against Dumbarton on 3 December 2011. Ater making two appearances, Langfield returned to his parent club at Aberdeen.

After being out for nine months, Langfield returned to Aberdeen’s first team as a starting goalkeeper and kept a clean sheet, in a 2–0 win over Inverness Caledonian Thistle on 21 April 2012. After the match, he said on his return: " It was good to be back and I thoroughly enjoyed it. There’s a big difference in playing in bounce games behind closed doors to the real thing. It was a good, all-round shut-out and three points so personally it has been a great day. The longer it went on the more you feel it’s never going to happen again. I just kept my head down, worked as hard as I could and tried to show the manager and the coaching staff the best attitude as I could." Following this, Langfield made three more appearances later in the 2011–12 season.

Due to lack of first team football following his return from a loan spell at Forfar Athletic, it emerged that Langfield could leave Aberdeen in order to search for regular first team football. On 21 April 2012, he was offered a new two-year contract with the club, which was later confirmed four days later. On 2 May 2012, it was confirmed that Langfield signed a two–year contract with Aberdeen.

==== 2012–13 season ====
In the opening game of the 2012–13 season against champions Celtic, Langfield made his first appearance of the season, where he let slip under his body to allow the only goal coming from a shot by Kris Commons, as Aberdeen loss 1–0. After the match, Langfield was then subject to abuse on the social networking site Twitter, with references made to the brain seizure that he had suffered the previous year. Despite this, Langfield retained his place in a follow–up match against Ross County and kept a clean sheet, in a 0–0 draw. He then kept three consecutive clean sheets between 23 August 2012 and 1 September 2012. Since the start of the 2012–13 season, Langfield was chosen as Aberdeen’s first-choice goalkeeper role over Jason Brown.

Langfield expressed hope he would like to see the club win silverware one day. In mid–November, Langfield underwent his second scheduled operation and he was given the all-clear as a result. Langfield played his first match since his operation, in a 2–0 loss against Celtic on 17 November 2012. During a 1–0 win against Celtic on 24 November 2013, Langfield suffered a hip injury at the second-half but he played for the rest of the match. Shortly after, Langfield quickly recovered from the injury and made his 250th league appearance, in a 3–2 loss against Inverness Caledonian Thistle. However, in a match against Kilmarnock on 15 December 2012, Langfield was sent-off after a straight red card following a foul on Borja Perez and gave away a penalty, as Aberdeen loss 2–0. After the match, the club said they would appeal his sending off. However, this was rejected by The Scottish Football Association, meaning he served a one match suspension.

After serving a one match suspension, Langfield returned to the starting line–up against Motherwell on 26 December 2012, where he saved a penalty from Michael Higdon, in a 4–1 loss. A week later on 2 January 2013, Langfield scored an own goal in a 2–2 draw against the club's rivals, Dundee United. On 22 April 2013, he earned his 84th Scottish Premier League’s clean-sheet, in a 0–0 draw against Hibernian, taking him a step closer to overtaking Stefan Klos, Allan McGregor and Rab Douglas, the only players with more. At the end of the 2012–13 season, Langfield made forty–three appearances in all competitions.

==== 2013–14 season ====
Ahead of the 2013–14 season, Langfield said he’s aiming to a overtake Allan McGregor’s clean sheet record in top-flight football in Scotland and help Aberdeen secure a place in Europe. Since the start of the 2013–14 season, Langfield continued to remain as Aberdeen’s first-choice goalkeeper despite the new signing of Nicky Weaver. However, in a match against Celtic on 17 August 2013, he received a straight red card at half–time for giving away a penalty, as the club went on to lose 2–0. After serving a one match suspension, Langfield returned to the starting line–up against Alloa Athletic in the second round of the Scottish League Cup and played throughout 120 minutes to a penalty shootout following a 0–0 draw, where he saved a decisive penalty from Michael Doyle to send Aberdeen to the next round. Langfield followed–up by keeping four consecutive clean sheets between 31 August 2013 and 25 September 2013.

Langfield only conceded a total of two goals between September and October, as he, once again, kept four consecutive clean sheets between 19 October 2013 and 4 October 2013. On 21 November 2013, he signed a contract extension, keeping him at the club until 2016. Langfield played a vital role when he assisted a goal in both matches against St Johnstone and St Mirren on 7 December 2013 and 14 December 2013 respectively. Manager Derek McInnes said about Langfield’s form, saying: "He has every right to be proud of such an achievement, but I am proud of all my players. They have done well for me and coped brilliantly with the difficult conditions." His teammate Russell Anderson said about Langfield’s performance: "It's another clean sheet but we rode our luck a bit against St Mirren and had Jamie to thank. I know that the Scotland guys are looking and it can only be a matter of time before they take notice. It's not down to luck or coincidence that he is collecting all these clean sheets. For me, Jamie is in the best form of his career. In the two spells I have been here this is the best he has played, but it's credit to the organisation and effort throughout the team that we have built this clean sheet record."

In the semi–finals match against St Johnstone on 1 February 2014, Langfield kept a clean sheet and helped Aberdeen beat the opposition team 4–0 to reach the final for the first time in fourteen years. During the 2013–14 season, Langfield spoke out about the defending champion, Celtic, saying: "Celtic Park has not been the best of venues for me and I haven't had the best of luck against Celtic in the past. The 9-0 game [in November 2010] was a very sore one and people talk about it. I don't think I've ever beaten Celtic with Aberdeen, although I won there with Dundee, and it would be good to put that to bed by winning this one." In a fifth round of the Scottish Cup match against Celtic on 8 February 2014, he helped the club beat the opposition team 2–1 to go through to the next round and beating Celtic for the first time in his Aberdeen’s career. On 25 February 2014, Langfield started in goal one again for the club’s match against Celtic and helped the side win 2–1, giving the opposition team their first league loss of the season. In a follow–up match against St Johnstone, he earned his 100th clean sheet in top-flight football in Scotland, with a 1–0 win. Langfield started in goal in the Scottish League Cup final against Inverness Caledonian Thistle, where he played the entire match which finished 0–0 after extra–time and went to a penalty-shootout; Aberdeen won 4–2 on penalties, with Langfield's save from one of the Inverness attempts sealing victory. After the match, Langfield said: "winning a cup at Parkhead with a team I love and I want to be part of. That's incredible." His performance was praised by his goalkeeper coach Jim Leighton, saying: "I've never seen Jamie play better than he is at the moment. It's great to see him reaping the rewards for the effort I see him putting in at training every day."

Following this, Langfield helped the club fulfil his promise of securing European football next season, but finished third place in the league after losing 1–0 against Motherwell. In the build up to the goal, he was fouled by John Sutton, but referee Steven McLean "did not rule for any infringement", a decision that was criticised by manager McInnes. At the end of the 2013–14 season, Langfield went on to make forty–six appearances in all competitions.

==== 2014–15 season ====
The 2014–15 season started well for Langfield when he started and played all 90 minutes in Aberdeen’s six matches in the UEFA Europa League qualifying rounds, in which he kept three clean sheets. However, Langfield played in both legs in the third round qualifying round of the UEFA Europa League against Real Sociedad as the club were eliminated from the tournament. Three days later on 10 August 2014, he conceded three goals, in a 3–0 loss against Dundee United in the opening game of the season.

Despite this, Langfield continued to remain as the first-choice goalkeeper for Aberdeen. However, his performances soon came under criticism, as he conceded nine goals in four matches between 27 September 2014 and 17 October 2014, including a 3–0 defeat to Hamilton Academical on 17 October 2014. As a result, he was placed on the bench and Scott Brown was made the first-choice from the next match against Motherwell onwards.

On 13 March 2015, Langfield made his return to the first team in goal for Brown and helped the club win 2–1 against Motherwell. He returned for two more matches against Dundee and Partick Thistle. Langfield was replaced again by Brown for the rest of the season, as Aberdeen finished second-place and again qualified for UEFA Europa League next season. At the end of the 2014–15 season, he made nineteen appearances in all competitions.

It was announced on 5 May 2015 that Langfield was awarded a testimonial by Aberdeen. The match against Brighton & Hove Albion was played on 26 July 2015 and ended 1–0 with Adam Rooney scoring the only goal. At half time, some of Langfield's former teammates including Darren Mackie, Lee Miller, Derek Young, Lee Mair, Barry Nicholson, Scott Severin and Michael Hart played in a mini match. Langfield later tweeted "Thank you for everything always in mine and my family's hearts #COYR." He was also in consideration for the club's goalkeeping coach before the role went to Gordon Marshall.

On 11 August 2015, Aberdeen announced that they had reached an agreement with Langfield to terminate the remainder of his contract with the club.

=== St Mirren ===
On 13 August 2015, Langfield signed a two-year player-coach contract with St Mirren. It came after when the club were interested in signing him.

He made his debut for the club, starting the whole game, in a 2–1 win against Annan Athletic in the last sixteen of the Scottish Cup. In a follow–up match, Langfield kept a clean sheet, in 0–0 draw against local rivals, Greenock Morton on 21 August 2015. After the match, former manager Duffy, who was managing Greenock Morton at the time, praised Langfield’s performance. Since joining St Mirren, he quickly established himself as the club’s first-choice goalkeeper. Despite being a first-choice goalkeeper for St Mirren, Langfield said that he would step aside as a starting keeper if he feels another keeper deserves it ahead of him. In a match against Rangers on 25 October 2015, Langfield was at fault when he was allowed a goal from Jason Holt’s strike, as the club loss 1–0. Langfield had a successful first season with Saints, making thirty–nine appearances in all competitions.

At the start of the 2016–17 season, Langfield found himself competing over the first-choice goalkeeper role with Scott Gallacher. The first two months of the 2016–17 season saw him made six appearances in all competitions for St Mirren. After the appointment of Jack Ross as the club’s new manager, Langfield was chosen over Gallacher for six matches throughout October. In his 50th appearance for St Mirren against Hibernian on 29 October 2016, he saved a penalty from Grant Holt, in a 2–0 loss. In a follow–up match against Dumbarton, Langfield made a howler when "he gave the ball away to Joe Thomson who set up Gary Fleming to score the only goal of the game". Following this, Langfield dropped to the bench for most of the 2016–17 season and concentrated on a coaching role. But he did make one more appearance for the club later in the 2016–17 season, which came in a 1–1 draw against Dunfermline Athletic on 14 January 2017, in what turns out to be his last professional football match. At the end of the 2016–17 season, Langfield made thirteen appearances in all competitions. Following this, he signed a new one-year contract in May 2017, where it was anticipated he would continue in a non-playing capacity.

Though Langfield quietly retired from professional football, Langfield was re-registered as a player when he was given a number forty–one shirt ahead of the 2017–18 season. Langfield appeared once as an unused substitute during the 2017–18 season. He was re-registered as a player and was on the bench for St Mirren's Scottish Premiership game against Hibernian on 12 September 2020 after goalkeepers Jak Alnwick, Dean Lyness and Peter Urminský were all ruled out due to COVID-19 protocols.

== Post-playing career ==
Explaining his decision to join St Mirren goalkeeping coach, Langfield said: "We have a relatively young squad so we need that little bit of experience in there as well. It bodes well for the future. At this stage in my career it’s a challenge that really excites me. I enjoy working with young lads because I like to see them develop. The other thing is I’m a big kid at heart. I might be 35 but I’m still as crazy as I was when I was 18, so hopefully they will like how I come across, but the most important thing is that I hope my experience can help them throughout the season." When Ian Murray was sacked, he took charge with the club, alongside with Alex Miller.

After the 2016–17 season have been concluded, Langfield retired from professional football to fully concentrated as St Mirren’s goalkeeping coach. During a 1–0 loss against Dundee United on 9 April 2018, he was involved in an argument with manager Csaba László. His tenure as the club’s goalkeeping coach was praised by goalkeepers, such as, Danny Rogers, Trevor Carson, Zach Hemming and Ellery Balcombe. Langfield was also "credited for his sustained period of success in recruitment and development of goalkeepers", such as, Hemmings, Carson, Balcombe, Václav Hladký, Jak Alnwick and Dean Lyness.

Langfield, alongside Lee Sharp, took charge for St Mirren’s match against Celtic on 21 August 2021 after Jim Goodwin tested positive for COVID-19. He was made caretaker manager of St Mirren on 19 February 2022, following the departure of Goodwin. Following the departure of Stephen Robinson, Langfield assisted Craig McLeish for the club’s first team matters for the 2025–26 season.

=== International ===
Langfield represented Scotland’s youth levels. In May 1999, he was shortlisted for the Three Nations Tournament but wasn’t chosen by the Scotland U21 squad. For the rest of 1999, Langfield was called up to the under-21 side once more but did not play. In the first five months of 2000, he continued to be called up to the Scotland U21 squad as an unused substitute on two occasions. On 31 May 2000, Langfield made his under-21 debut, starting the whole game and kept a clean sheet, in a 1–0 win against Wales. After spending the first nine months as an unused substitute for Scotland U21 squad, he made his second for the under-21 side, in a 1–1 draw against Croatia on 31 August 2001.

In April 2002, Langfield was called up to the senior Scotland team for the match against Nigeria but he failed to make the final cut. During the same month, he was called to the Scotland B squad, but also didn’t play as well. Langfield played his first match for the B team, coming on as a second-half substitute for Alan Combe, in a 2–0 win against Dundee United on 30 April 2002.

In February 2007, Langfield was called up to the Scotland B squad. He made his one appearance for Scotland B team against Finland B, drawing 2–2 in what turned out to be his only appearance. Later that year, Langfield was called up to the Scotland B squad but did not play.

In October 2007, Langfield was called up to the senior Scotland team for the first time as the national team’s third-choice goalkeeper. He was several times called upon to the Scotland’s squad but never gained a full cap. In February 2014, Langfield’s form at Aberdeen led to a potential chance of him getting a Scotland’s call-up, led to response: "I just keep my head down and keep working away. I'm more than happy with what I'm doing just now. If you ever get the chance to go away with Scotland, it's an amazing thing to do. If it was to happen again, I definitely wouldn't say no."

== Personal life ==
Langfield is married to his wife, Louise, a nurse, and together, they have two daughters, Ruby and Maisie. During his playing career, he earned a nickname called "Clangers".

Outside of football, Langfield is a self-confessed Marmite Man. He grew up in Paisley, with his parents, three younger brothers and a younger sister. Following the brain seizure that affected his career, Langfield helped raise money for the charity BareAll4BTs which helps those affected by brain tumours, by auctioning his gloves.

== Career statistics ==
Appearances and goals by club, season and competition
Club	Season	League			Scottish Cup		League Cup		Other		Total	
Club	Season	Division	Apps	Goals	Apps	Goals	Apps	Goals	Apps	Goals	Apps	Goals
Dundee	1998–99	Scottish Premier League	2	0	0	0	0	0	—		2	0
Dundee	1999–2000	Scottish Premier League	1	0	1	0	0	0	—		2	0
Dundee	2000–01	Scottish Premier League	9	0	0	0	0	0	—		9	0
Dundee	2001–02	Scottish Premier League	21	0	0	0	2	0	2 (Note: Appearances in the Intertoto Cup)	0	25	0
Dundee	2002–03	Scottish Premier League	0	0	0	0	0	0	—		0	0
Dundee	Total		33	0	1	0	2	0	2	0	38	0
Raith Rovers (loan)	2003–04	Scottish First Division	5	0	0	0	0	0	0	0	5	0
Partick Thistle	2003–04	Scottish Premier League	10	0	0	0	0	0	—		10	0
Dunfermline Athletic	2004–05	Scottish Premier League	0	0	0	0	0	0	0	0	0	0
Aberdeen	2005–06	Scottish Premier League	20	0	2	0	2	0	—		24	0
Aberdeen	2006–07	Scottish Premier League	38	0	2	0	0	0	—		40	0
Aberdeen	2007–08	Scottish Premier League	25	0	3	0	3	0	8 (Note: Appearances in the UEFA Cup)	0	39	0
Aberdeen	2008–09	Scottish Premier League	38	0	4	0	0	0	—		42	0
Aberdeen	2009–10	Scottish Premier League	35	0	3	0	1	0	2 (Note: Appearances in the Europa League)	0	41	0
Aberdeen	2010–11	Scottish Premier League	31	0	5	0	2	0	—		38	0
Aberdeen	2011–12	Scottish Premier League	4	0	0	0	0	0	—		4	0
Aberdeen	2012–13	Scottish Premier League	37	0	3	0	3	0	—		43	0
Aberdeen	2013–14	Scottish Premiership	37	0	4	0	5	0	—		46	0
Aberdeen	2014–15	Scottish Premiership	13	0	0	0	0	0	6	0	19	0
Aberdeen	Total		278	0	26	0	16	0	16	0	336	0
Forfar Athletic (loan)	2011–12	Second Division	2	0	0	0	0	0	0	0	2	0
St Mirren	2015–16	Championship	34	0	1	0	1	0	3 (Note: Appearances in the Scottish Challenge Cup)	0	39	0
St Mirren	2016–17	Championship	9	0	0	0	2	0	2	0	13	0
St Mirren	2017–18	Championship	0	0	0	0	0	0	0	0	0	0
St Mirren	2018–19	Scottish Premiership	0	0	0	0	0	0	0	0	0	0
St Mirren	2019–20	Scottish Premiership	0	0	0	0	0	0	0	0	0	0
St Mirren	2020–21	Scottish Premiership	0	0	0	0	0	0	0	0	0	0
St Mirren	Total		43	0	1	0	3	0	5	0	52	0
Career total			371	0	28	0	21	0	23	0	443	0

== Honours ==
Aberdeen

- Scottish League Cup: 2013–14
