= Peter Pawlett =

Footballer (born 1991)

Personal information
- Full name: Peter Ian Pawlett
- Date of birth: 3 February 1991 (age 35)
- Place of birth: Hull, England
- Height: 5 ft 10 in (1.78 m)
- Position: Winger

Team information
- Current team: Peterhead
- Number: 19

Youth career
- –2007: Aberdeen

Senior career*
Years	Team	Apps	(Gls)
2007–2017	Aberdeen	172	(16)
2012–2013	→ St Johnstone (loan)	9	(0)
2017–2019	Milton Keynes Dons	31	(3)
2019–2023	Dundee United	88	(6)
2024–	Peterhead	59	(8)

International career
2009	Scotland U19	1	(0)
2011–2012	Scotland U21	7	(1)
- * Club domestic league appearances and goals as of 4 May 2026

Peter Ian Pawlett (born 3 February 1991) is a professional footballer who plays as a midfielder for Scottish League One club Peterhead. He spent much of his early career at Aberdeen and has also played for St Johnstone, Milton Keynes Dons and Dundee United.

Born in England, he has been capped for Scotland at U19 and U21 levels.

== Early life ==
Born on 3 February 1991 in Hull, East Riding of Yorkshire but moved to Banchory, Aberdeenshire aged around 7. He grew up supporting Hull City.

== Club career ==
=== Aberdeen ===
Pawlett was brought up in Aberdeen from a young age and made his Aberdeen debut in February 2009, coming on as a substitute in a 5–0 Scottish Cup victory over East Fife. He made his SPL debut for Aberdeen as a substitute in a 3–1 loss to Celtic on 2 May 2009, and he made his first league start in a 2–1 loss to Rangers two weeks later.

On 7 November 2009, Pawlett set up the first goal for Sone Aluko in a 2–1 win over St Johnstone. Soon after, Pawlett, along with four other players, was offered a new contract and eventually signed a four-year deal soon after During the season, in January 2010, Pawlett sustained a knee injury which required surgery. A month later it was reported that the injury would keep him out of action for the remainder of the 2009–10 season. In each of the next two seasons, Pawlett spoke out about his injury, saying he had worked for optimum fitness while undergoing rehabilitation and that he was able to move on from his injury.

Pawlett made his return at the beginning of the 2010–11 season and played his first match in a 4–0 win over Hamilton Academical at the opening game of the season. After making three more appearances during the season, Pawlett suffered a toe injury and this kept him for three months. He made his return in a 5–0 defeat to Heart of Midlothian on 11 December 2010. On 30 April 2011, Pawlett scored his first goal for Aberdeen in a 1–0 win over Inverness Caledonian Thistle.

On 20 December 2011 in a 1–0 win over Hibernian, Pawlett received a straight red card after a challenge on Lewis Stevenson. In the second half before his sending off, he fell theatrically inside the penalty box when challenged by Ivan Sproule, resulting in a penalty being given which was converted by Scott Vernon. After the game, he was given a two match suspension by the SFA. The club decided against appealing the ban.

On 23 August 2012, Pawlett joined fellow Scottish Premier League side St Johnstone on loan until January 2013. Pawlett made his debut, coming on as a substitute in a 2–0 loss against Hibernian. Pawlett went on to make nine appearances for St Johnstone and stated his desire to stay at the club for the rest of the season On 1 January, the loan spell was extended for another two games, although there was also the possibility of a permanent move. However, after the sale of fellow midfielder Ryan Fraser to Bournemouth, Aberdeen recalled the midfielder to play in their first team. After his loan spell ended, St Johnstone Manager Steve Lomas said he wasn't surprised that Aberdeen had chosen to recall Pawlett. After being recalled from his loan with St Johnstone, he made his first appearance since leaving on loan, in a 0–0 draw against Hibernian. During the match, Pawlett created controversy when he was booked for diving, leading Craig Brown to say that if it was found he had dived, the club would take action against him. During that game, Pawlett gained more notoriety when his shorts fell down after getting tackled by Gary Deegan, revealing his underpants. a match against Dundee on 5 May 2013, Pawlett was criticised for allegedly diving to win a penalty. The penalty was converted by Niall McGinn to level the game. The match finished 1–1, but the draw wasn't enough to prevent Dundee being relegated to the First Division. After criticism of the diving, Pawlett received a two-match suspension, which was accepted by the club, following an investigation from the SFA.

In the 2013–14 season Pawlett retained his first team place, mostly playing as more of an attacking midfielder. He would score five league goals, against Partick Thistle, St Mirren, St Johnstone, Inverness Caledonian Thistle and Dundee United during the season. His good performances earned a contract extension, which will keep him at Aberdeen until 2017. In the second half of the season, Pawlett would play a vital role for the club, as he scored one and then set one up, in a 4–0 win over St Johnstone, to send the club to the Scottish League Cup final for the first time in fourteen years. Then, in the fifth round of the Scottish Cup, Pawlett scored the winning goal in a 2–1 win over holders Celtic, the first time Aberdeen had beaten Celtic since 2008.

In 2014, he was the subject of a campaign by Aberdeen fans to get The Human League song 'Don't You Want Me' to Number One in the charts following the success of their version singing 'Peter Pawlett baby'.

Pawlett did not play regularly for Aberdeen in the following seasons, as Niall McGinn and Jonny Hayes were the first choice wingers.

=== Milton Keynes Dons ===
On 9 March 2017, English League One side Milton Keynes Dons announced that Pawlett had signed a pre-contract deal to join the club at the end of the 2016–17 season.

Pawlett made his first appearance for his new club on 5 August 2017 in a 1–0 home defeat to Wigan Athletic, coming on as a 63rd-minute substitute for Ryan Seager. On 2 December 2017, Pawlett scored his first goal for the club in a 4–1 FA Cup second round home win over Maidstone United.

=== Dundee United ===
On 31 January 2019, Pawlett joined Scottish Championship club Dundee United for an undisclosed fee. Two days later, he scored the winning goal in a 2–1 win for United against Greenock Morton. Following relegation to the Scottish Championship in the 2022–23 season, Pawlett was released by United at the end of the season.

=== Peterhead ===
After a few months out of the game, Pawlett signed with Scottish League Two side Peterhead in January 2024.

== International career ==
Born in Hull, Pawlett was initially only eligible for England. Following a revision of the Home nations agreement Pawlett became eligible to play for Scotland, as Pawlett was educated in Banchory for eight years. Pawlett was selected for the Scotland under-19 team in November 2009 and spoke out about his delight at having switched nationality. On 16 May 2014, Pawlett was called into the senior Scotland squad for a friendly against Nigeria.

== Career statistics ==
As of 14 August 2021

Appearances and goals by club, season and competition
Club	Season	League			National cup		League cup		Other		Total	
Club	Season	Division	Apps	Goals	Apps	Goals	Apps	Goals	Apps	Goals	Apps	Goals
Aberdeen	2008–09	Scottish Premier League	5	0	1	0	0	0	0	0	6	0
Aberdeen	2009–10	Scottish Premier League	14	0	2	0	1	0	0	0	17	0
Aberdeen	2010–11	Scottish Premier League	13	1	2	0	1	0	0	0	16	1
Aberdeen	2011–12	Scottish Premier League	21	0	2	0	2	0	0	0	25	0
Aberdeen	2012–13	Scottish Premier League	12	0	1	0	1	0	0	0	14	0
Aberdeen	2013–14	Scottish Premiership	35	5	3	1	4	1	0	0	42	7
Aberdeen	2014–15	Scottish Premiership	36	6	1	0	3	0	5 (Note: Appearances in the UEFA Europa League)	1	45	7
Aberdeen	2015–16	Scottish Premiership	18	1	1	0	1	0	6	1	26	2
Aberdeen	2016–17	Scottish Premiership	18	3	2	0	1	0	1	0	22	3
Aberdeen	Total		172	16	15	1	14	1	12	2	213	20
St Johnstone (loan)	2012–13	Scottish Premier League	9	0	0	0	0	0	0	0	9	0
Milton Keynes Dons	2017–18	League One	24	3	2	1	0	0	2 (Note: Appearances in the EFL Trophy)	0	28	4
Milton Keynes Dons	2018–19	League Two	7	0	0	0	0	0	0	0	7	0
Milton Keynes Dons	Total		31	3	2	1	0	0	2	0	35	4
Dundee United	2018–19	Scottish Championship	11	2	2	0	0	0	4 (Note: Appearances in the Scottish Premiership play-offs)	0	17	2
Dundee United	2019–20	Scottish Championship	17	1	2	0	0	0	1 (Note: Appearance in the Scottish Challenge Cup)	0	20	1
Dundee United	2020–21	Scottish Premiership	26	1	4	1	3	0	0	0	33	2
Dundee United	2021–22	Scottish Premiership	2	0	0	0	4	2	0	0	6	2
Dundee United	Total		56	4	8	1	7	2	5	0	76	7
Career total			268	23	25	3	21	3	19	2	333	31

== Honours ==
Aberdeen

- Scottish League Cup: 2013–14

Dundee United

- Scottish Championship: 2019–20

Individual

- Scottish Premier League Young Player of the Month: November 2009
- PFA Scotland Team of the Year: 2013–14 Premiership
