= Tommy Wright (footballer, born 1984) =

English footballer & manager (born 1984)

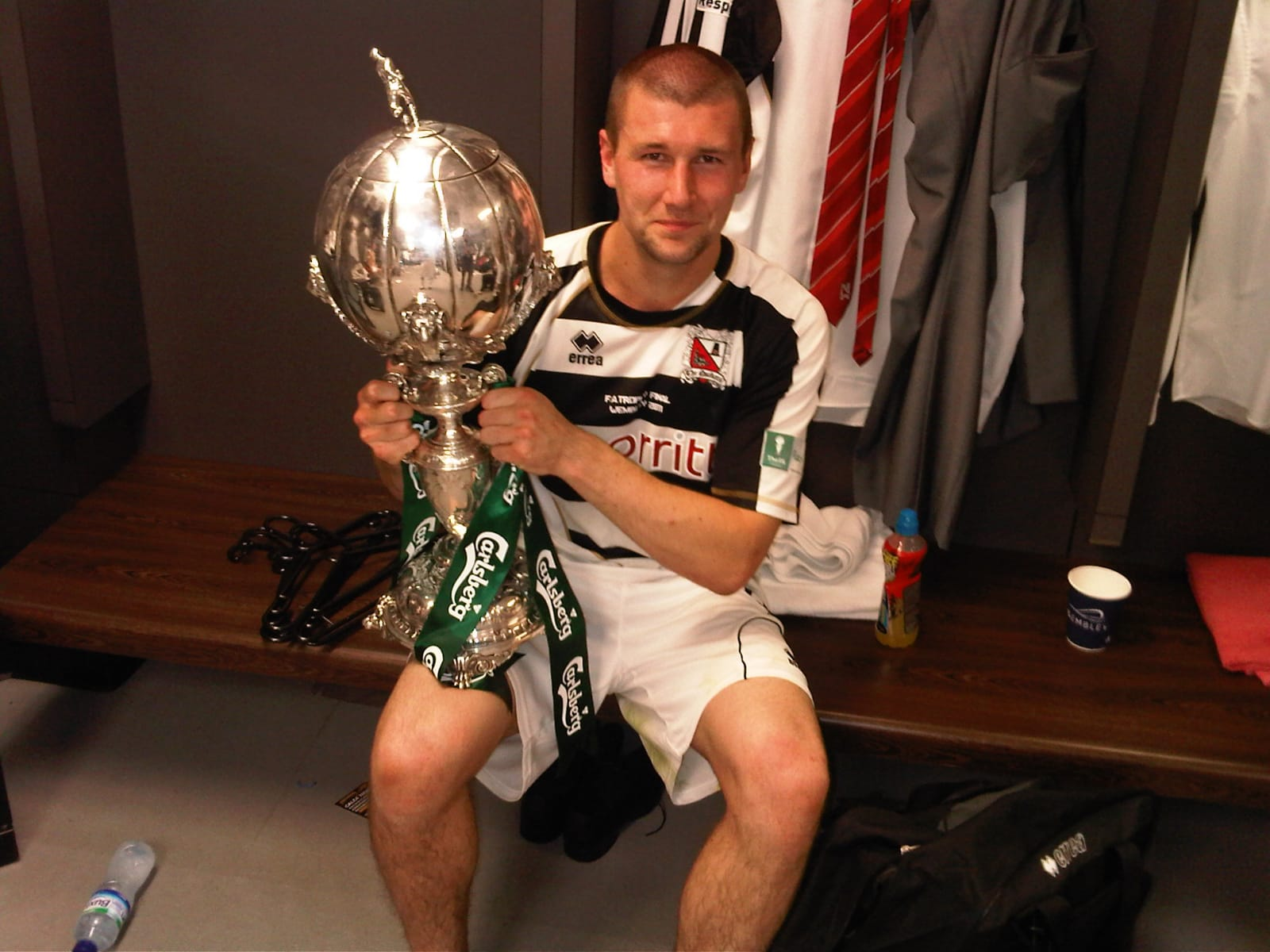
- Wright with FA Trophy 2011

Personal information
- Full name: Thomas Andrew Wright
- Date of birth: 28 September 1984 (age 42)
- Place of birth: Kirby Muxloe, England
- Height: 6 ft 0 in (1.83 m)
- Position: Striker

Senior career*
Years	Team	Apps	(Gls)
2001–2006	Leicester City	21	(2)
2003–2004	→ Brentford (loan)	25	(7)
2005	→ Blackpool (loan)	13	(6)
2006–2007	Barnsley	34	(2)
2006–2007	→ Walsall (loan)	6	(2)
2007–2008	Darlington	54	(17)
2008–2010	Aberdeen	18	(1)
2010	Grimsby Town	14	(1)
2010–2011	Darlington	22	(4)
2011	Kidderminster Harriers	2	(0)
2011–2012	Luton Town	4	(1)
2012	Forest Green Rovers	7	(2)
2012–2013	Tamworth	41	(8)
2013	Harrogate Town	4	(1)
2013–2016	Corby Town	57	(7)
2016–2017	Nuneaton Town	1	(0)
Total		323	(61)

International career
2002–2003	England U19	10	(5)
2003	England U20	4	(0)

Managerial career
- 2013–2016: Corby Town (player-manager)
- 2016–2017: Nuneaton Town (player-manager)
- 2017–2019: Darlington
- 2019: Stratford Town
- 2020: Corby Town
- * Club domestic league appearances and goals

Thomas Andrew Wright (born 28 September 1984) is an English former professional footballer and manager.

A former England under-19 and under-20 international, Wright started his career with Leicester City, helping them into the Premier League in 2002–03. However he failed to hold down a regular first team place at the higher level, and was loaned out to Brentford and Blackpool, before transferring to Barnsley in 2006. He helped the club gain promotion out of League One via the play-offs, before he joined Darlington in January 2007 following a short loan spell at League Two champions Walsall. He was sold on to Scottish Premier League side Aberdeen in August 2008 for a £100,000 fee. He returned to England in January 2010, signing with Grimsby Town, who were soon relegated out of the Football League. He rejoined Darlington, helping the club to lift the 2011 FA Trophy. He then appeared for a string of non-league clubs, latterly as player-manager with Corby Town and Nuneaton Town. In October 2017, he joined Darlington for a third spell, this time as manager. He left Darlington by mutual consent at the end of the 2018–19 season after a lower mid table finish.

Wright is now a police officer, having taken a career change in December 2020.

== Playing career ==
=== Club ===
Wright was born in Kirby Muxloe, Leicester. He started his career at home town club Leicester City, making his Premier League debut under Dave Bassett on 23 March 2002, in a 2–0 home defeat to Leeds United, after he replaced Stefan Oakes on 86 minutes. The Foxes were relegated at the end of the season, and new manager Micky Adams played Wright 13 times in the 2002–03 First Division promotion campaign. He scored his first senior goal on 18 January, in a 3–2 win over Gillingham at Priestfield Stadium; his second goal was the only one of the game against rivals Nottingham Forest at the Walkers Stadium on 8 April. He was offered a new contract at the end of the campaign.

Despite BBC Sport's Phil McNulty naming the youngster as "one to watch" ahead of the 2003–04 season – 13 of the 20 he named went on to become full internationals – Wright did not feature for Leicester at all during the campaign. Instead, manager Wally Downes took him to Brentford on loan in September 2003. He scored three goals in 25 Second Division matches in 2003–04 before his contribution to the team was ended by an ankle injury in April. Leicester were relegated at the end of the season, and Wright played seven Championship and two cup games in the 2004–05 campaign. He joined League One Blackpool on loan at the start of the 2005–06 season, and hit six goals in fifteen games under the management of Colin Hendry and then Simon Grayson.

Wright signed for League One Barnsley on 1 January 2006 for a £50,000 fee. Manager Andy Ritchie led the Tykes to promotion via the play-offs in 2005–06; Wright scored once in 22 appearances. He appeared in the play-off final victory over Swansea City at the Millennium Stadium after coming on for Marc Richards after 70 minutes. Barnsley's promotion to the Championship saw Wright figure more from the bench for the Yorkshire side during the 2006–07 season, and in November he was sent on a two-month loan to League Two side Walsall. Scoring on his debut at the Bescot Stadium, he netted twice in five starts for the Saddlers, who went on to top the division under manager Richard Money.

Having failed to agree personal terms with Rotherham United, Wright signed with Dave Penney's Darlington, also of League Two. He finished the season with four goals in 13 appearances for the Quakers. He fired Darlington into the play-offs in 2007–08, where they were knocked out by Rochdale at the semi-final stage; Wright finished as the club's top scorer with thirteen goals. He was nominated for the League Two player of the month award for January after scoring three goals in the space of six games, but lost out to Grimsby Town's Danny North.

On 8 August 2008, Wright was transferred to Scottish Premier League club Aberdeen, manager Jimmy Calderwood paying a fee of £100,000; the deal had been delayed while Wright was recovering from a knee injury. Wright caused a stir in his first appearance in an Aberdeen shirt, receiving a yellow card for a reckless challenge, and allegedly attempting to headbutt Motherwell defender Stephen Craigan. He scored his first senior goal for the Dons from the edge of the area in a Scottish Cup fifth-round tie against East Fife at Pittodrie on 17 February. Shortly after, on 3 March, he netted his first SPL goal, a "wonderful" header from the edge of the area for a last-minute equaliser in a 1–1 draw with St Mirren. He finished the 2008–09 campaign with two goals in nineteen games, and Aberdeen finished fourth to secure a place in the UEFA Europa League.

His injury problems continued into the 2009–10 season. By January it became clear that new manager Mark McGhee had little faith in Wright, and he told the striker that he was available for a transfer. League One club Stockport County failed to pursue their initial interest, and on 27 January, Aberdeen released Wright from his contract, which still had 18 months to run.

Wright promptly signed an 18-month contract with Grimsby Town of League Two. He struggled to hold a place in the team and finished the season with just one goal in fourteen games as the team were relegated from the League. Despite initially making public his desire to stay at the club, he rejoined his former club Darlington a few days later having exercised a clause in his Grimsby contract allowing him to leave with immediate effect. The team had fallen into the Conference Premier in his absence, and were now led by manager Simon Davey. Davey left the club, and within a few weeks Wright went public with his praise of successor Mark Cooper. Wright scored five goals in 29 games in 2010–11, and appeared in the 2011 FA Trophy Final against Mansfield Town at Wembley; at the very end of normal time, "from eight yards and unmarked, he somehow headed wide", but in the last minute of extra time, his header looped up off the crossbar for Chris Senior to win the game for Darlington.

In September 2011, Wright was released from his Darlington contract, and embarked on a series of short-team deals. He first signed for Conference rivals Kidderminster Harriers on non-contract terms with the view to earning himself a longer contract, but made only two appearances for the club. On 18 October he joined fellow Conference side Luton Town for three months, during which he scored three goals in six appearances, including one against former club Grimsby. He began training with League Two side Port Vale – managed by his former boss at Leicester, Micky Adams – in January 2012, but then signed for Forest Green Rovers of the Conference Premier. Wright made a goalscoring debut on 18 February in a 2–1 win against Gateshead, and contributed two goals from seven appearances before being released at the end of the season.

Wright spent 2012–13 as a first-team regular with Tamworth, and scored five goals from 41 Conference Premier matches as the team avoided relegation on the final day of the season. In June 2013, he became Conference North side Harrogate Town's fourth summer signing, but he was released in September to begin his managerial career.

=== International ===
Wright scored five goals from ten appearances for the England under-19 team. He played at the 2003 European Championships in Liechtenstein. He played alongside Stewart Downing in defeats to Austria and the Czech Republic and a 2–0 win over France; the English finished third in the group and were therefore eliminated.

He also made four appearances at under-20 level without scoring. He was a member of the squad for the 2003 FIFA World Youth Championship in the United Arab Emirates, starting in the defeat to Egypt and coming on as a substitute in the defeat to Japan and draw with eventual third-place finishers Colombia; they finished bottom of their group and were eliminated without scoring a goal.

== Managerial career ==
In September 2013, Wright was released by Harrogate Town to take the post of joint manager of Southern Football League Premier Division club Corby Town, alongside former Histon coach Andrew Wilson. At the end of the 2013–14 season, Wright was appointed as the sole manager by the club's new owners. On the final day of the 2014–15 season, Corby Town won the Southern Premier title by beating league leaders Poole Town, who earlier in the season had been well clear in the table. The club struggled in the National League North, and were relegated. After a poor start to the 2016–17 season, Wright was sacked.

A few days later, Wright joined National League North club Nuneaton Town as player-coach. He took over as manager in November, and led the team to a mid-table finish. In October 2017, he was approached by Darlington to replace Martin Gray, who had resigned as manager earlier that month. He initially turned them down, but changed his mind within days, much to the disappointment of Nuneaton's chairman, and took up the appointment at Darlington on 20 October. He led Darlington to a mid-table finish in 2017–18. Darlington announced on 26 April 2019 that Wright would be leaving the club after the final game of the season the following day. Wright was announced as the new manager of Stratford Town on 7 June 2019. He left the club in October 2019, and returned to Corby as manager in May 2020. However, he resigned in July 2020.

== Personal life ==
Wright now works as a Police officer for Leicestershire Police.

== Career statistics ==
=== Player ===
Appearances and goals by club, season and competition
Club	Season	League			FA Cup		League Cup (Note: Column includes appearances in Football League Cup, Scottish League Cup and Southern League Cup)		Other		Total	
Club	Season	Division	Apps	Goals	Apps	Goals	Apps	Goals	Apps	Goals	Apps	Goals
Leicester City	2001–02	Premier League	1	0	0	0	0	0	—		1	0
Leicester City	2002–03	First Division	13	2	1	0	0	0	—		14	2
Leicester City	2003–04	Premier League	0	0	—		—		—		0	0
Leicester City	2004–05	Championship	7	0	1	0	1	0	—		9	0
Leicester City	2005–06	Championship	0	0	0	0	—		—		0	0
Leicester City	Total		21	2	2	0	1	0	0	0	24	2
Brentford (loan)	2003–04	Second Division	25	3	0	0	—		0	0	25	3
Blackpool (loan)	2005–06	League One	13	6	0	0	0	0	2 (Note: Appearances in Football League Trophy)	0	15	6
Barnsley	2005–06	League One	17	1	2	0	—		3 (Note: Appearances in League One play-offs)	0	22	1
Barnsley	2006–07	Championship	17	1	0	0	2	0	—		19	1
Barnsley	Total		34	2	2	0	2	0	3	0	41	2
Walsall (loan)	2006–07	League Two	6	2	—		—		—		6	2
Darlington	2006–07	League Two	13	4	—		—		—		13	4
Darlington	2007–08	League Two	40	13	2	1	1	1	2 (Note: One appearance in Football League Trophy, one in League Two play-offs)	0	45	15
Darlington	Total		53	17	2	1	1	1	2	0	58	19
Aberdeen	2008–09	Scottish Premier League	15	1	3	1	1	0	—		19	2
Aberdeen	2009–10	Scottish Premier League	3	0	0	0	0	0	0	0	3	0
Aberdeen	Total		18	1	3	1	1	0	0	0	22	2
Grimsby Town	2009–10	League Two	14	1	—		—		—		14	1
Darlington	2010–11	Conference Premier	22	4	3	1	—		4 (Note: Appearances in FA Trophy)	0	29	5
Darlington	2011–12	Conference Premier	0	0	—		—		—		0	0
Darlington	Total		22	4	3	1	—		4	0	29	5
Kidderminster Harriers	2011–12	Conference Premier	2	0	—		—		—		2	0
Luton Town	2011–12	Conference Premier	4	1	1	1	—		1	1	6	3
Forest Green Rovers	2011–12	Conference Premier	7	2	—		—		—		7	2
Tamworth	2012–13	Conference Premier	41	8	1	0	—		3	2	45	10
Harrogate Town	2013–14	Conference North	4	1	—		—		—		4	1
Corby Town	2013–14	Southern League Premier	28	6	5	1	1	0	1	0	35	7
Corby Town	2014–15	Southern League Premier	21	1	1	0	0	0	1 (Note: Appearance in Northamptonshire Senior Cup)	0	23	1
Corby Town	2015–16	National League North	8	0	2	0	—		0	0	10	0
Corby Town	Total		57	7	8	1	1	0	2	0	68	8
Career total			321	57	22	5	6	1	17	3	366	66

=== Manager ===
As of match played 27 April 2019

Managerial record by team and tenure
Team	From	To	Record					Ref
Team	From	To	P	W	D	L	Win %	Ref
Nuneaton Town	18 November 2016	20 October 2017	42	18	9	15	42.86	
Darlington	22 October 2017	27 April 2019	71	21	21	29	29.58	
Overall			113	39	30	44	34.51	

== Honours ==
=== Player ===
Leicester City

- Football League First Division runner-up : 2002–03

Barnsley

- Football League One play-offs: 2006

Darlington

- FA Trophy: 2010–11

=== Player-manager ===
Corby Town

- Southern League: 2014–15
