= Jared Hodgkiss =

British footballer (born 1986)

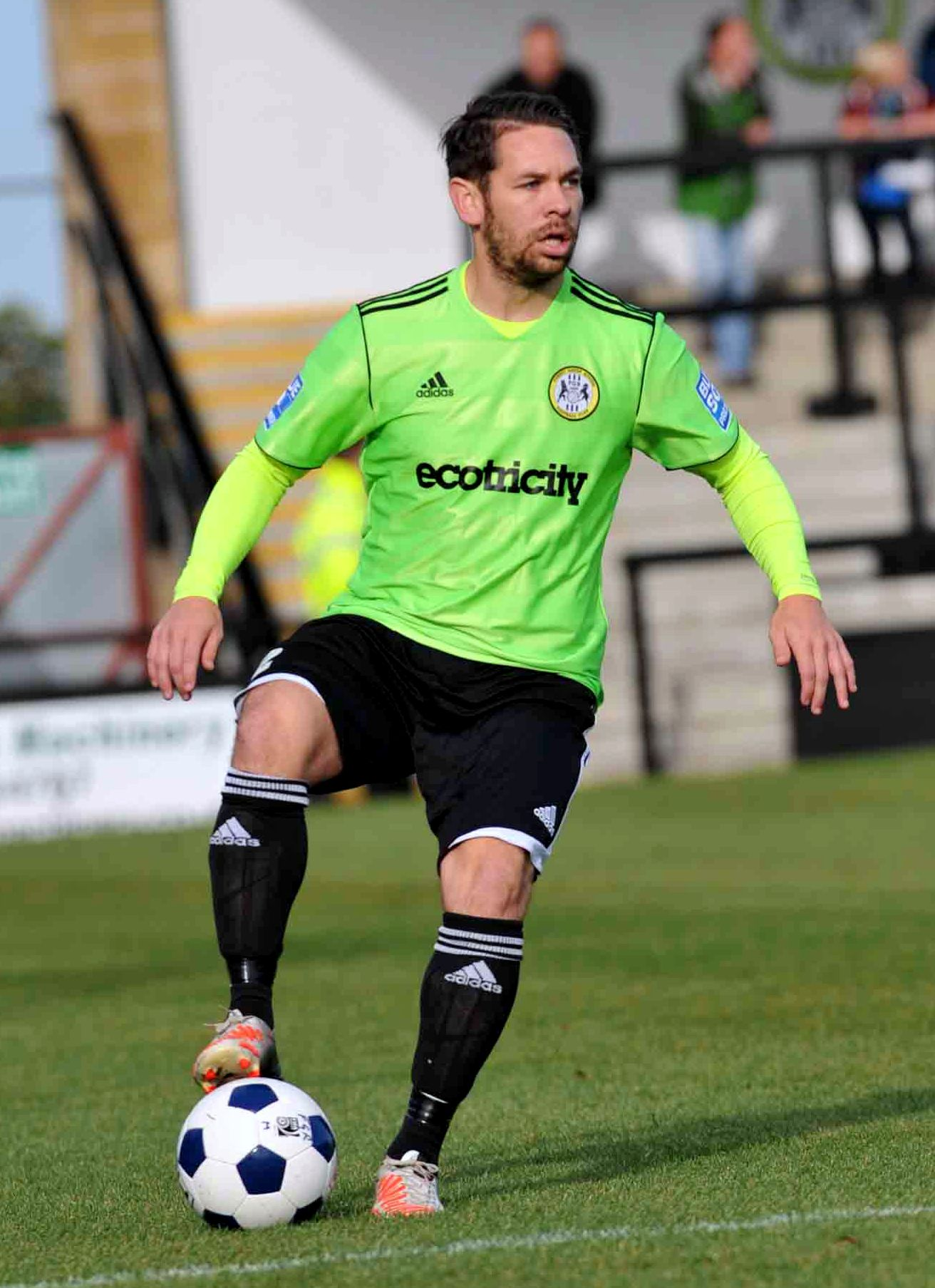
- Hodgkiss playing for Forest Green Rovers in 2013

Personal information
- Full name: Jared George Hodgkiss
- Date of birth: 15 November 1986 (age 39)
- Place of birth: Stafford, England
- Height: 5 ft 8 in (1.73 m)
- Position: Right-back

Youth career
- –2005: West Bromwich Albion

Senior career*
Years	Team	Apps	(Gls)
2005–2009	West Bromwich Albion	9	(0)
2008–2009	→ Aberdeen (loan)	7	(0)
2009	→ Northampton Town (loan)	5	(0)
2009	Market Drayton Town	4	(0)
2009–2014	Forest Green Rovers	164	(4)
2014–2017	Kidderminster Harriers	94	(1)
2017	→ Torquay United (loan)	8	(0)
2017–2019	Macclesfield Town	41	(1)
2019–2023	Hereford	103	(5)
2023–2024	AFC Telford United	14	(1)
Total		436	(12)
- * Club domestic league appearances and goals

Jared George Hodgkiss (born 15 November 1986) is an English retired footballer who played as a right-back.

== Career ==
=== West Bromwich Albion ===
Hodgkiss was born in Stafford, Staffordshire. He made his first team debut in the FA Cup third round match against Reading on 17 January 2006 at the Madejski Stadium. His Premier League debut came on 7 May 2006, coming on for Steve Watson on the last match day of the season, at Goodison Park against Everton. In August 2007 Hodgkiss signed a new two-year deal at Albion. His full league debut was in a 2–1 win away at Leicester City on 8 December 2007.

In August 2008, he joined Aberdeen on a loan deal until January 2009 and made eight appearances for the Scottish side. A second loan spell followed in March, this time at Northampton Town for the remainder of the season. Hodgkiss played five games for the League One club.

Hodgkiss was released by West Brom in the summer of 2009. After his release, Hodgkiss maintained his match fitness by playing for Market Drayton Town in the Northern Premier League Division One South.

=== Forest Green Rovers ===
In October 2009, Hodgkiss signed for Conference Premier side Forest Green Rovers. He made his debut on 3 October 2009 in a 1–0 away defeat against Mansfield Town. He scored his first goal for the club in a FA Cup first round proper 1–1 draw with Mansfield Town a month later. His first league goal for Forest Green came in a 1–1 home draw with Cambridge United on 20 February 2010.

After an impressive spell with Forest Green, he was awarded a new one-year contract for the 2010–11 season. He picked up a knee injury in February 2011 and was forced to have an operation as well as six weeks out on the sidelines. In June 2011, Hodgkiss signed a new one-year contract with Forest Green. In July 2011 it was announced that he would be the new first team captain at Forest Green for the 2011–12 season. On 6 March 2012, he agreed a new extended contract with Forest Green that would keep him at the club until the end of the 2013–14 season. He made his 100th league appearance for Forest Green on the final day of the 2011–12 season against York City.

On 28 April 2014, having made 164 league appearances for Forest Green, he was released after a five-season stay with the club.

=== Kidderminster Harriers ===
On 23 June 2014, Hodgkiss joined Kidderminster Harriers on a one-year contract. He made his debut for the club on the opening day of the 2014–15 Conference Premier season where he played the full 90 minutes in a 0–0 away draw with Lincoln City. He left the club in the summer 2017.

=== Hereford ===
On 26 July 2019, Hodgkiss joined National League North club Hereford after a successful trial period.

In May 2021, Hodgkiss captained Hereford as they appeared in the 2021 FA Trophy Final.

In May 2022, Hodgkiss signed a one-year contract extension at Hereford, extending his stay for the 2022–23 season.

On 2 June 2023, Hereford announced Hodgkiss would be leaving the club after four seasons after a deal could not be reached to continue with the club.

=== AFC Telford United ===
Following his release from Hereford, on 22 June 2023, Hodgkiss signed for AFC Telford United of the Southern League Premier Division Central, having been relegated from the National League North in the 2022–23 season.

== Career statistics ==
As of match played 10 February 2023

Appearances and goals by club, season and competition
Club	Season	League			National Cup		League Cup		Other		Total	
Club	Season	Division	Apps	Goals	Apps	Goals	Apps	Goals	Apps	Goals	Apps	Goals
West Bromwich Albion	2005–06	Premier League	1	0	1	0	0	0	—		2	0
West Bromwich Albion	2006–07	Championship	4	0	0	0	1	0	—		5	0
West Bromwich Albion	2007–08	Championship	4	0	1	0	3	0	—		8	0
West Bromwich Albion	Total		9	0	2	0	4	0	0	0	15	0
Aberdeen (loan)	2008–09	Scottish Premier League	7	0	0	0	1	0	—		8	0
Northampton Town (loan)	2008–09	League Two	5	0	0	0	0	0	0	0	5	0
Forest Green Rovers	2009–10	Conference Premier	31	1	5	1	—		1 (Note: Appearance(s) in FA Trophy)	0	37	2
Forest Green Rovers	2010–11	Conference Premier	23	0	2	0	—		1	0	26	0
Forest Green Rovers	2011–12	Conference Premier	46	0	1	1	—		2	0	49	1
Forest Green Rovers	2012–13	Conference Premier	26	0	1	0	—		1	0	28	0
Forest Green Rovers	2013–14	Conference Premier	38	3	0	0	—		4	0	42	3
Forest Green Rovers	Total		164	4	9	2	—		9	0	182	6
Kidderminster Harriers	2014–15	Conference Premier	44	1	1	0	—		2	0	47	1
Kidderminster Harriers	2015–16	National League	26	0	1	0	—		1	0	28	0
Kidderminster Harriers	2016–17	National League North	9	0	0	0	—		0	0	9	0
Kidderminster Harriers	Total		70	1	2	0	—		3	0	75	1
Torquay United (loan)	2016–17	National League	8	0	0	0	—		0	0	8	0
Macclesfield Town	2017–18	National League	30	1	2	0	—		0	0	32	1
Macclesfield Town	2018–19	League Two	17	0	1	0	0	0	2 (Note: Appearance(s) in EFL Trophy)	0	20	0
Macclesfield Town	Total		47	1	3	0	0	0	2	0	52	1
Hereford	2019–20	National League North	28	1	0	0	—		0	0	28	1
Hereford	2020–21	National League North	13	2	0	0	—		6	0	19	2
Hereford	2021–22	National League North	34	2	1	0	—		1	0	36	2
Hereford	2022–23	National League North	28	0	2	0	—		0	0	30	0
Hereford	Total		103	5	3	0	—		7	0	113	5
AFC Telford United	2023–24	Southern League; Premier Division Central	14	1	1	0	—		0	0	15	1
Career total			436	12	20	2	5	0	21	0	481	14
