= Jonathan Crawford =

Scottish footballer

Personal information
- Date of birth: 12 March 1990 (age 36)
- Place of birth: Glasgow, Scotland
- Position: Defender

Team information
- Current team: Montrose

Senior career*
Years	Team	Apps	(Gls)
2009–2010	Aberdeen	3	(0)
2010	→ Peterhead (loan)	14	(0)
2010–	Montrose	111	(4)
- * Club domestic league appearances and goals as of 20:54, 6 January 2013 (UTC)

Jonathan Crawford (born 12 March 1990) is a Scottish professional footballer who plays for Montrose.

== Career ==
Crawford started his career at Aberdeen, where he featured as an unused substitute for two years. In February 2009, Crawford signed a twelve-month contract extension.

He made his first team debut on 22 August 2009, for Aberdeen against Hamilton Academical. However, his time team opportunities and his own injury concerns limited his place.

In January 2010, he went on loan to Peterhead for a month. After making fourteen appearances at Peterhead, it announced that Crawford will be released by the club, citing contract expiration.

On 17 September 2010, he joined Montrose until the end of the season after he impressed as a trialist.

Towards the end of the 2013–2014 season, Crawford was linked a move to Cove Rangers after the move was agreed. However, the move was broken down for unknown circumstances.

== Career statistics ==
As of 6 January 2013

Club	Season	League			FA Cup		League Cup		Other^{[A]}		Total	
Club	Season	Division	Apps	Goals	Apps	Goals	Apps	Goals	Apps	Goals	Apps	Goals
Aberdeen	2007–08	Scottish Premier League	0	0	0	0	0	0	0	0	0	0
Aberdeen	2008–09	Scottish Premier League	0	0	0	0	0	0	0	0	0	0
Aberdeen	2009–10	Scottish Premier League	2	0	0	0	1	0	0	0	3	0
Peterhead (loan)	2009–10	Scottish Second Division	14	0	0	0	0	0	0	0	14	0
Aberdeen Total			2	0	0	0	1	0	0	0	3	0
Montrose	2010–11	Scottish Third Division	19	1	0	0	0	0	0	0	19	1
Montrose	2011–12	Scottish Third Division	28	3	0	0	0	0	1	0	29	3
Montrose	2012–13	Scottish Third Division	17	0	0	0	2	0	0	0	19	0
Total			64	4	0	0	2	0	1	0	67	4
Career totals			79	4	0	0	3	0	1	0	83	4

A. The "Other" column constitutes appearances (including substitutes) and goals in the Scottish Challenge Cup.
