= Sammy Stewart (footballer, born 1991) =

Northern Irish footballer

Personal information
- Full name: Sam Stewart
- Date of birth: 25 November 1990 (age 35)
- Place of birth: Craigavon, Northern Ireland
- Position: Midfielder

Senior career*
Years	Team	Apps	(Gls)
2007–2008	Glenavon	16	(1)
2008–2010	Aberdeen	1	(0)
2010–2011	Glenavon	16	(0)
2011–12	Lisburn Distillery	0	(0)
2012	Ambassadors		
2013	Portadown	2	(0)
2013	Ambassadors		
2014–2015	Cowdenbeath	6	(1)
- * Club domestic league appearances and goals as of 17:16, 22 October 2014 (UTC)

Sammy Stewart (born 25 November 1990 in Portadown, Northern Ireland) is a Northern Irish former professional football player.

== Career ==
=== Glenavon ===
Stewart started his career with the Irish Premier League side Glenavon in 2007.

=== Aberdeen ===
In May 2008, Stewart signed a two-year deal with Scottish Premier League side Aberdeen. after the club buying him for a reported £15,000 from Glenavon FC. He scored his first goal for The Dons in a friendly against Inverurie on 5 August 2008.

His first (and only) competitive appearance for Aberdeen was on 24 May 2009, when he replaced Sone Aluko in the last game of the season against Hibernian.

On 5 January 2010, he was released by Aberdeen by mutual consent.

=== Return to Glenavon ===
In August 2010, Stewart returned to Glenavon, signing a one-year deal.

=== Lisburn Distillery & Portadown ===
Stewart then had a spell at Lisburn Distillery and played for Mid-Ulster Football League club Ambassadors Fc, before signing for Portadown.

=== Cowdenbeath ===
On 31 January 2014, Stewart signed for Scottish Championship club Cowdenbeath. Stewart was released by the club at the end of the season.

== Personal life ==
His brother Thomas is currently a football manager in Sweden.
