= Bertrand Bossu =

French footballer (born 1980)

Personal information
- Full name: Bertrand Bossu
- Date of birth: 14 October 1980 (age 46)
- Place of birth: Calais, France
- Height: 6 ft 7 in (2.01 m)
- Position: Goalkeeper

Youth career
- 1989–1997: Calais RUFC
- 1997–1999: Lens

Senior career*
Years	Team	Apps	(Gls)
1999–2000	Lens	0	(0)
2000–2001	Barnet	1	(0)
2000	→ Hayes (loan)	1	(0)
2001	→ Rushden & Diamonds (loan)	0	(0)
2001–2003	Hayes	60	(1)
2003–2005	Gillingham	4	(0)
2004	→ Torquay United (loan)	2	(0)
2004	→ Oldham Athletic (loan)	0	(0)
2005–2006	Darlington	9	(0)
2005	→ Accrington Stanley (loan)	1	(0)
2006–2008	Walsall	1	(0)
2008–2009	Aberdeen	1	(0)
2009	Crewe Alexandra	0	(0)
2011–2013	Harlow Town	22	(0)
2013–2015	Calais RUFC	0	(0)
2015–2017	Gravelines		
- * Club domestic league appearances and goals

Bertrand Bossu (born 14 October 1980) is a French former professional footballer who played as a goalkeeper. After his retirement from playing, he worked as a goalkeeping coach.

== Career ==
=== France ===
Born in Calais, Pas-de-Calais, Bossu started out as a boy at small French amateur club US Blériot-Plage, before joining Calais RUFC. When he was 16 he moved to RC Lens but never managed to play for the professional team there as he was confined to the third and fourth teams.

=== Barnet and Hayes ===
Bossu joined Barnet in March 2000. He made his debut and subsequently only first team appearance for Barnet on 17 May 2000 in the second leg of the play-off semi-final. Barnet were trailing 2–0 (4–1 on aggregate) away to Peterborough United when Bossu replaced the injured Lee Harrison in the Barnet goal. He conceded one more goal, giving David Farrell his hat-trick and confirming Peterborough's place in the final.

He joined Conference side Hayes on loan in December 2000. His one-man heroics in the 1–0 win away to Boston United on 2 December ended a run of seven consecutive defeats. However, in the process Bossu broke a finger and returned to Barnet to recuperate.

He joined Rushden & Diamonds on loan in March 2001, but failed to make a first team appearance for them and was released by Barnet at the end of the season. He rejoined Hayes in August 2001, but lost his place as Hayes were relegated from the Conference. Although he began the following season as second-choice, he regained his place in the side and went on to win the Hayes Supporters' Player of the Year Award in 2003. In the midst of this he had also become the first Hayes goalkeeper to score a goal, with a last-minute header in the game away to St Albans City.

=== Gillingham ===
Bossu joined Gillingham in September 2003 and made his debut later that month away to Walsall. He played just five more times that season, including the victory at home to Premier League side Charlton Athletic in the FA Cup.

In August 2004 he joined Torquay United on a three-month loan deal playing in the first two games of the season away to Bristol City and at home to Hull City the same month. However, he was sent back to Gillingham by Torquay with a knee injury, prompting a row over who should pay his wages. He joined Oldham Athletic in late October 2004, but failed to make a first team appearance. He was released by Gillingham at the end of the 2004–05 season after failing to report for pre-season training.

=== Darlington and Walsall ===
Bossu joined Darlington in August 2005. The same month he joined Accrington Stanley on loan, playing one Conference National game away to Cambridge United before returning to Darlington where he played 10 times before being released at the end of the season. He then joined Walsall in September 2006, but was released in May 2008.

=== Aberdeen ===
After being released by Walsall, Bossu then went on trial with Scottish Premier League side Aberdeen. After impressing goalkeeping coach Jim Leighton, he was offered a contract with the Scottish club. Bossu left Aberdeen in August 2009 after only three appearances for the club.

He signed for Crewe Alexandra on a two-month contract on 28 October following a successful trial. However, he left six days later after asking for his contract to be cancelled.

=== Later career ===
Bossu joined Isthmian League Division One North side Harlow Town in August 2011.

He spent two seasons with Gravelines.

As of April 2018, he was a goalkeeping coach at Coulogne and Calais Football Club.

== Honours ==
Walsall

- League Two: 2006–07
