= Munnuru Kapu =

Hindu caste in South India

- Classification: Other Backward Classes (OBC)
- Religions: Hinduism
- Languages: Telugu
- Country: India
- Region: Telangana

Munnuru Kapu is a Telugu-speaking caste primarily found in the Indian state of Telangana. This caste belongs to the Other Backward Class (OBC) category added by the Government of Andhra Pradesh. Traditionally, they are a community of cultivators and are distributed across Telangana. They are also present in Nanded and Latur districts of Maharashtra.

Munnuru Kapus are described as an economically and politically prominent community of Telangana. In the 2018 Telangana Assembly, Munnuru Kapus were the third largest caste in terms of representation on unreserved seats with eight MLAs; next only to Reddy and Velama communities. Some members of the community have also ventured into industry and business, and became established businessmen like B. V. Rao, Vikram Akula, and Myadam Kishan Rao, P.Shiva Shankar (Union Minister), Amdiyala Sriramulu (freedom fighter).

== Etymology ==
Munnuru means three hundred. and Kapu means cultivator or protector in Telugu. According to some writers, Telangana being a rocky area and deficient in water, has acute water scarcity. The Kapus who were water diviners (Munnuru = Mun + Neeru = water diviner) were said to have been called Munnuru Kapus.

Another version of the etymology also exists. As per some other writers, 300 Kapu families migrated to present-day Telangana in the medieval period and they came to be called as Munnuru Kapus (transl. Kapus of the three hundred families).

== Geographical distribution ==
Munnuru Kapus are distributed mostly in Telangana. They are also present in few numbers in Nanded, Latur, Yavatmal, Chandrapur districts of Maharashtra

Munnuru Kapus are also settled in North America ( USA and Canada) refer to MANA (Munnuru Kapu Association of North America ): MANA

== History ==
Traditionally, they are a community of cultivators and large sections of them are still into agriculture. several served as village Patels, an official who maintained law and order in the village. Some have also risen to a high status as landlords and Zamindars, but the majority are ordinary cultivators.

A considerable portion of the Munnurus over the years have entered government service or become traders. Some members of the community have also ventured into industry and business, and became established businessmen like B. V. Rao, Vikram Akula, and Myadam Kishan Rao.

== Notable people ==
- Sripathi Rajeshwar Rao TDP FORMER MINISTER & FORMER MLA (Sanathnagar) & Senior Leader in HYDERABAD & United AP.
- B. V. Rao, founder of the V H Group (Venky's) and father of Indian poultry industry
- Vikram Akula, founder of SKS Microfinance
- Myadam Kishan Rao, founder of Bambino Agro (maker of Bambino Vermicelli)
- P. Shiv Shankar, served as Union Minister of External Affairs, Law, Power, and Petroleum and as Governor of Sikkim and Kerala states
- Bandi Sanjay, Central Minister of State for Home Affairs (2024–present)
- Dharmapuri Arvind, MP from Nizamabad
- K. Laxman, politician
- V. Hanumantha Rao, former president of APPCC in Erstwhile Andhra Pradesh.
- Konda Surekha, Cabinet minister in Telangana Government
- Gadwal Vijayalakshmi, current mayor of Greater Hyderabad Municipal Corporation (GHMC)
- D. Srinivas, politician, former Cabinet minister in Erstwhile Andhra Pradesh Government and former president of APPCC
- Ponnala Lakshmaiah, former IT minister of Erstwhile Andhra Pradesh

== See also ==
- Kapu (caste)
- Patel
