= 2010–11 Blackburn Rovers F.C. season =

Blackburn Rovers
2010–11 season
- Chairman: John Williams
- Manager: Sam Allardyce (until 13 December); Steve Kean
- Ground: Ewood Park (capacity 31,154)
- Premier League: 15th
- FA Cup: Fourth round
- League Cup: Third round
- Top goalscorer: League: Nikola Kalinić, David Hoilett and Jason Roberts (5); All: Nikola Kalinić, David Hoilett and Mame Biram Diouf (6)
- Highest home attendance: 29,867 (vs. Manchester United, 14 May)
- Lowest home attendance: 9,235 (vs. Norwich City, 24 August)
- Average home league attendance: 24,999 (Premier League); 23,548 (Overall)
Home colours	Away colours

The 2010–11 season was Blackburn Rovers' 123rd season as a professional football club. The 2010–11 season was also Blackburn Rovers' 17th season in the Premier League, and their 10th consecutive season in the top division of English football.

In November 2010, the Indian company V H Group bought Blackburn Rovers under the name of Venky's London Limited for £23 million. A few weeks later the new owners sacked manager Sam Allardyce and replaced him with first-team coach Steve Kean, initially on a temporary basis, but by January 2011 he had been awarded a full-time contract until June 2013. Kean's appointment was shrouded in a great deal of controversy since his agent Jerome Anderson had earlier played a major role in advising Venky's during the takeover of the club in the preceding months.

== First-team squad ==
Note: Flags indicate national team as defined under FIFA eligibility rules; some limited exceptions apply. Players may hold more than one non-FIFA nationality.

No.	Pos.	Nation	Player
1	GK	ENG	Paul Robinson
2	MF	USA	Jermaine Jones (on loan from Schalke 04)
3	DF	SWE	Martin Olsson
4	DF	CGO	Christopher Samba (captain)
5	DF	FRA	Gaël Givet
6	DF	NZL	Ryan Nelsen (vice-captain)
7	MF	AUS	Brett Emerton
8	MF	ENG	David Dunn
9	FW	CRO	Nikola Kalinić
10	MF	ARG	Mauro Formica
11	MF	AUS	Vince Grella
12	MF	NOR	Morten Gamst Pedersen
13	GK	ENG	Mark Bunn
15	MF	FRA	Steven Nzonzi

No.	Pos.	Nation	Player
17	MF	IRL	Keith Andrews
18	FW	PAR	Roque Santa Cruz (on loan from Manchester City)
20	FW	ESP	Rubén Rochina
21	FW	ZIM	Benjani
23	FW	CAN	David Hoilett
26	MF	FRA	Hérold Goulon
27	DF	ESP	Míchel Salgado
28	DF	ENG	Phil Jones
30	FW	GRN	Jason Roberts
31	DF	SCO	Grant Hanley
33	DF	ENG	Josh Morris
36	MF	ENG	Michael Potts
41	FW	SEN	Mame Biram Diouf (on loan from Manchester United)

== Club ==
=== Technical staff ===
Position	Staff
Head coach	(Scotland) Steve Kean
Assistant manager	(Denmark) John Jensen
Assistant coaches	(England) Iain Brunskill (England) Bobby Mimms
Goalkeeping coach	(England) Bobby Mimms

Last updated: December 2010

=== Medical staff ===
Position	Staff
Doctor	(England) Dr. Phil Batty
Physiotherapists	(England) Dave Fevre (England) Paul Kelly (England) Mark Palmer

Last updated: December 2010

== Results ==
=== Pre-season ===
10 July 2010 17:00	Sturm Graz	0 – 0	Blackburn Rovers	Graz
				Stadium: UPC-Arena; Attendance: 3,515

10 July 2010 15:00	Vauxhall Motors	0 – 3	Blackburn Rovers Reserves	Ellesmere Port
			Aley 9'; Rodrigo Branco 56'; Blackman 61'	Stadium: Rivacre Park

14 July 2010	Kendal Town	2 – 3	Blackburn Rovers Reserves	Kendal
	Keiran Walmsley		Matthew Pearson 15'; Blackman 17', 55'	Stadium: Lakeland Radio Stadium; Attendance: 337

17 July 2010 15:00	Fleetwood Town	0 – 2	Blackburn Rovers	Fleetwood
			Roberts 7'; Nzonzi 84'	Stadium: Highbury Stadium; Attendance: 1,570

17 July 2010 15:00	Southport	0 – 3	Blackburn Rovers Reserves	Southport
			Chimbonda 18'; Rigters 23'; Dunn 82'	Stadium: Haig Avenue; Attendance: 469

20 July 2010 19:45	Preston North End	3 – 0	Blackburn Rovers	Preston
	Hayes 19', 45'; Chris Brown 59' (pen.)			Stadium: Deepdale; Attendance: 5,067

21 July 2010 19:45	Huddersfield Town	1 – 0	Blackburn Rovers	Huddersfield
	Guðjónsson 17'			Stadium: Galpharm Stadium; Attendance: 6,651

24 July 2010 15:00	Rhyl	0 – 2	Blackburn Rovers Reserves	Rhyl
			Blackman 60', 90'	Stadium: Belle Vue; Attendance: 428

25 July 2010 15:00 – Sydney Festival of Football 2010	Rangers	2 – 1	Blackburn Rovers	Sydney
	Edu; Miller		Dunn	Stadium: Sydney Football Stadium; Attendance: 14,153

27 July 2010 19:45	Barrow	0 – 2	Blackburn Rovers Reserves	Barrow-in-Furness
			Nick Blackman	Stadium: Holker Street; Attendance: Unknown

28 July 2010 18:00 – Sydney Festival of Football 2010	AEK Athens	2 – 1	Blackburn Rovers	Sydney
	Scocco 21'; Liberopoulos 24'		Jones 81'	Stadium: Sydney Football Stadium; Attendance: 9,483

31 July 2010 19:15 – Sydney Festival of Football 2010	Sydney FC	1 – 2	Blackburn Rovers	Sydney
	Brosque 81'		Emerton 37'; Pedersen 67'	Stadium: Sydney Football Stadium; Attendance: 15,237

7 August 2010 15:00	Burscough	0 – 2	Blackburn Rovers Reserves	Burscough
			Rodrigo Branco	Stadium: Victoria Park; Attendance: 163

7 August 2010 15:00	Heart of Midlothian	1 – 1	Blackburn Rovers	Edinburgh
	Santana 25'		M. Diouf 60'	Stadium: Tynecastle Stadium; Attendance: 6,333

8 August 2010	Celtic	1 – 2	Blackburn Rovers	Glasgow
	Fortuné 16'		Dunn 11'; Judge 72'	Stadium: Celtic Park

=== Premier League ===
==== League table ====
Pos	Team	Pld	W	D	L	GF	GA	GD	Pts	Qualification or relegation
13	Stoke City	38	13	7	18	46	48	−2	46	Qualification for the Europa League third qualifying round (Note: Stoke City qualified for the third qualifying round of the Europa League as FA Cup runners-up to Champions League-qualified Manchester City.)
14	Bolton Wanderers	38	12	10	16	52	56	−4	46	
15	Blackburn Rovers	38	11	10	17	46	59	−13	43	
16	Wigan Athletic	38	9	15	14	40	61	−21	42	
17	Wolverhampton Wanderers	38	11	7	20	46	66	−20	40	

Source: Barclays Premier League
Rules for classification: 1) points; 2) goal difference; 3) number of goals scored.

==== Results summary ====
Overall								Home						Away					
Pld	W	D	L	GF	GA	GD	Pts	W	D	L	GF	GA	GD	W	D	L	GF	GA	GD
38	11	10	17	46	59	−13	43	7	7	5	22	16	+6	4	3	12	24	43	−19

Last updated: 4 December 2018.
Source: 11v11

==== Results per matchday ====
Matchday	1	2	3	4	5	6	7	8	9	10	11	12	13	14	15	16	17	18	19	20	21	22	23	24	25	26	27	28	29	30	31	32	33	34	35	36	37	38
Ground	H	A	H	A	H	A	A	H	A	H	H	A	A	H	A	H	A	H	H	A	A	H	A	H	H	A	H	A	A	H	A	H	A	H	H	A	H	A
Result	W	L	L	D	D	W	L	D	L	L	W	W	L	W	L	W	L	D	L	W	L	W	L	W	L	L	D	L	L	D	D	D	L	L	W	D	D	W
Position	5	9	12	14	14	8	12	14	17	17	15	13	14	11	13	8	13	13	13	9	11	9	11	7	9	11	11	13	14	13	14	14	16	16	15	15	15	15

Source: Statto.com
A = Away; H = Home; W = Win; D = Draw; L = Loss

==== August ====
14 August 2010 15:00	Blackburn Rovers	1 – 0	Everton	Blackburn
	Kalinić 14'	[Report]		Stadium: Ewood Park; Attendance: 25,869

21 August 2010 15:00	Birmingham City	2 – 1	Blackburn Rovers	Birmingham
	Gardner 57', 71'	[ Report]	Nzonzi 54'	Stadium: St Andrew's; Attendance: 21,394

28 August 2010 15:00	Blackburn Rovers	1 – 2	Arsenal	Blackburn
	M. Diouf 27'	[ Report]	Walcott 20'; Arshavin 51'	Stadium: Ewood Park; Attendance: 25,059

==== September ====
11 September 2010 15:00	Manchester City	1 – 1	Blackburn Rovers	Manchester
	Vieira 55'	[ Report]	Kalinić 25'	Stadium: City of Manchester Stadium; Attendance: 44,246

18 September 2010 15:00	Blackburn Rovers	1 – 1	Fulham	Blackburn
	Samba 30'	[ Report]	Dempsey 56'	Stadium: Ewood Park; Attendance: 23,729

25 September 2010 15:00	Blackpool	1 – 2	Blackburn Rovers	Blackpool
	Phillips 85'	[ Report]	Adam 20' (o.g.); Emerton 90'	Stadium: Bloomfield Road; Attendance: 15,908

==== October ====
2 October 2010 15:00	Stoke City	1 – 0	Blackburn Rovers	Stoke-on-Trent
	Walters 48'	[ Report]		Stadium: Britannia Stadium; Attendance: 25,515

18 October 2010 20:00	Blackburn Rovers	0 – 0	Sunderland	Blackburn
		[ Report]		Stadium: Ewood Park; Attendance: 21,894

24 October 2010 15:00	Liverpool	2 – 1	Blackburn Rovers	Liverpool
	Kyrgiakos 48'; Torres 53'; Rodríguez (yellow card) 67'; Meireles (yellow card) 82'	[ Report]	Olsson (yellow card) 28'; Givet (yellow card) 28'; Carragher 51' (o.g.); Grella (yellow card) 90+4'	Stadium: Anfield; Attendance: 43,328

30 October 2010 15:00	Blackburn Rovers	1 – 2	Chelsea	Blackburn
	Benjani 21'	[ Report]	Anelka 39'; Ivanović 84'	Stadium: Ewood Park; Attendance: 25,836

==== November ====
6 November 2010 15:00	Blackburn Rovers	2 – 1	Wigan Athletic	Blackburn
	Pedersen 58'; Roberts 67'	[ Report]	N'Zogbia 74'	Stadium: Ewood Park; Attendance: 24,413

10 November 2010 19:45	Newcastle United	1 – 2	Blackburn Rovers	Newcastle-upon-Tyne
	Carroll 47'	[ Report]	Pedersen 3'; Roberts 82'	Stadium: St James' Park; Attendance: 41,053

13 November 2010 15:00	Tottenham Hotspur	4 – 2	Blackburn Rovers	London
	Bale 16', 75'; Pavlyuchenko 42'; Crouch 69'	[ Report]	Dunn 80'; Givet 90'	Stadium: White Hart Lane; Attendance: 35,700

21 November 2010 15:00	Blackburn Rovers	2 – 0	Aston Villa	Blackburn
	Pedersen 46', 66'	[ Report]		Stadium: Ewood Park; Attendance: 21,848

27 November 2010 15:00	Manchester United	7 – 1	Blackburn Rovers	Manchester
	Berbatov 2', 27', 47', 62', 70'; Park 23'; Nani 48'	[ report]	Samba 83'	Stadium: Old Trafford; Attendance: 75,850

==== December ====
4 December 2010 15:00	Blackburn Rovers	3 – 0	Wolverhampton Wanderers	Blackburn
	Dunn 20'; Emerton 43'; Nelsen 55'	[ report]		Stadium: Ewood Park; Attendance: 22,314

12 December 2010 15:00	Bolton Wanderers	2 – 1	Blackburn Rovers	Bolton
	Muamba 65'; Holden 88'	[ report]	M. Diouf 87'	Stadium: Reebok Stadium; Attendance: 24,471

18 December 2010 15:00	Blackburn Rovers	1 – 1	West Ham United	Blackburn
	Nelsen 51'	[ report]	Stanislas 78'	Stadium: Ewood Park; Attendance: 21,934

26 December 2010 15:00	Blackburn Rovers	0 – 2	Stoke City	Blackburn
		[ report]	Huth 50'; Wilson 90'	Stadium: Ewood Park; Attendance: 25,440

28 December 2010 15:00	West Bromwich Albion	1 – 3	Blackburn Rovers	West Bromwich
	Thomas 17'	[ report]	Kalinić 3', 54'; M. Diouf 63'	Stadium: The Hawthorns; Attendance: 24,440

==== January ====
1 January 2011 15:00	Sunderland	3 – 0	Blackburn Rovers	Sunderland
	Welbeck 11'; Bent 19'; Gyan 89'	[ report]		Stadium: Stadium of Light; Attendance: 36,242

5 January 2011 20:00	Blackburn Rovers	3 – 1	Liverpool	Blackburn
	Benjani 38', 57'; Olsson 32'	[ report]	Gerrard 81'	Stadium: Ewood Park; Attendance: 24,522

15 January 2011 15:00	Chelsea	2 – 0	Blackburn Rovers	London
	Ivanović 57'; Anelka 76'	[ report]		Stadium: Stamford Bridge; Attendance: 40,846

23 January 2011 15:00	Blackburn Rovers	2 – 0	West Bromwich Albion	Blackburn
	Tamaș 41' (o.g.); Hoilett 47'	[ report]		Stadium: Ewood Park; Attendance: 24,057

==== February ====
2 February 2011 20:00	Blackburn Rovers	0 – 1	Tottenham Hotspur	Blackburn
		[ report]	Crouch 3'	Stadium: Ewood Park; Attendance: 23,253

5 February 2011 15:00	Wigan Athletic	4 – 3	Blackburn Rovers	Wigan
	McCarthy 35', 56'; Rodallega 50'; Watson 65' (pen.)	[ report]	Roberts 23'; Samba 58'; Dunn 81' (pen.)	Stadium: JJB Stadium; Attendance: 18,567 (4,500 away)

12 February 2011 15:00	Blackburn Rovers	0 – 0	Newcastle United	Blackburn
		[ report]		Stadium: Ewood Park; Attendance: 26,781

26 February 2011 15:00	Aston Villa	4 – 1	Blackburn Rovers	Birmingham
	Young 49', 82'; Hanley 62' (o.g.); Downing 64'	[ report]	Kalinić 81'	Stadium: Villa Park; Attendance: 34,309 (290 away)

==== March ====
5 March 2011 15:00	Fulham	3 – 2	Blackburn Rovers	London
	Duff 37', 59'; Zamora 89' (pen.)	[ report]	Hanley 45+1'; Hoilett 65'	Stadium: Craven Cottage; Attendance: 25,687

19 March 2011 15:00	Blackburn Rovers	2 – 2	Blackpool	Blackburn
	Samba 49'; Hoilett 90+3'	report	Adam 25' (pen.), 29'	Stadium: Ewood Park; Attendance: 27,209

==== April ====
2 April 2011 15:00	Arsenal	0 – 0	Blackburn Rovers	London
		report		Stadium: Emirates Stadium; Attendance: 60,087

9 April 2011 15:00	Blackburn Rovers	1 – 1	Birmingham City	Blackburn
	Hoilett 45+6'	report	Bowyer 32'	Stadium: Ewood Park; Attendance: 28,426

16 April 2011 15:00	Everton	2 – 0	Blackburn Rovers	Liverpool
	Osman 54'; Baines 75' (pen.)	[ report]		Stadium: Goodison Park; Attendance: 35,857

25 April 2011 20:00	Blackburn Rovers	0 – 1	Manchester City	Blackburn
		[ report]	Džeko 75'	Stadium: Ewood Park; Attendance: 23,529

30 April 2011 15:00	Blackburn Rovers	1 – 0	Bolton Wanderers	Blackburn
	Olsson 20'	[ report]		Stadium: Ewood Park; Attendance: 28,985

==== May ====
7 May 2011 15:00	West Ham United	1 – 1	Blackburn Rovers	London
	Hitzlsperger 78'	[ report]	Roberts 12'	Stadium: Boleyn Ground; Attendance: 33,789 (950 away)

14 May 2011 12:45	Blackburn Rovers	1 – 1	Manchester United	Blackburn
	Emerton 20'	[ report]	Rooney 73' (pen.)	Stadium: Ewood Park; Attendance: 29,867

22 May 2011 16:00	Wolverhampton Wanderers	2 – 3	Blackburn Rovers	Wolverhampton
	O'Hara 73'; Hunt 87'	[ report]	Roberts 22'; Emerton 38'; Hoilett 45'	Stadium: Molineux Stadium; Attendance: 29,009

=== League Cup ===
24 August 2010 20:00	Blackburn Rovers	3 – 1	Norwich City	Blackburn
	M. Diouf 29', 79', 84'	[ report]	Askou 90'	Stadium: Ewood Park; Attendance: 9,235

22 September 2010 20:00	Aston Villa	3 – 1	Blackburn Rovers	Birmingham
	Heskey 59'; A. Young 75', 77'	[ report]	Givet 34'	Stadium: Villa Park; Attendance: 18,753

=== FA Cup ===
8 January 2011 Third round	Blackburn Rovers	1 – 0	Queens Park Rangers	Blackburn
15:00	Hoilett 77'	[ report]		Stadium: Ewood Park; Attendance: 10,284; Referee: Peter Walton

29 January 2011 Fourth round	Aston Villa	3 – 1	Blackburn Rovers	Birmingham
13:00	Clark 11'; Pires 35'; Delfouneso 42'	report	Kalinić 18'	Stadium: Villa Park; Attendance: 26,067; Referee: Lee Probert

== Statistics ==
=== Goal scorers ===
Place	Position	Nation	Number	Name	Premier League	League Cup	FA Cup	Total
1	FW	(Senegal)	41	Mame Biram Diouf	3	3	0	6
1	FW	(Croatia)	9	Nikola Kalinić	5	0	1	6
1	FW	(Canada)	23	David Hoilett	5	0	1	6
4	FW	(Grenada)	30	Jason Roberts	5	0	0	5
5	MF	(Norway)	12	Morten Gamst Pedersen	4	0	0	4
5	DF	(Republic of the Congo)	4	Christopher Samba	4	0	0	4
5	MF	(Australia)	7	Brett Emerton	4	0	0	4
8	MF	(England)	8	David Dunn	3	0	0	3
8	FW	(Zimbabwe)	21	Benjani	3	0	0	3
10	DF	(France)	5	Gaël Givet	1	1	0	2
10	DF	(New Zealand)	6	Ryan Nelsen	2	0	0	2
10	DF	(Sweden)	3	Martin Olsson	2	0	0	2
13	MF	(France)	15	Steven Nzonzi	1	0	0	1
13	DF	(Scotland)	31	Grant Hanley	1	0	0	1
				TOTALS	43	4	2	49

=== Transfers ===
==== In ====
Date	Pos.	Name	From	Fee
May 2010	DF	(Spain) Hugo Fernández	(Spain) Union Deportiva Cornella	Nominal fee
Aug 2010	FW	(Zimbabwe) Benjani	Free agent	Free
Oct 2010	MF	(France) Herold Goulon	(France) Le Mans	Nominal fee
Jan 2011.	FW	(Spain) Rubén Rochina	(Spain) Barcelona B	Undisclosed (est. £372,000 + £1,650,000 agent fee)
Jan 2011	MF	(Argentina) Mauro Formica	(Argentina) Newell's Old Boys	Undisclosed (est. £3,500,000)

Total spending: ▼ Undisclosed (est. £3,872,000+)

==== Loan in ====
From	To	Pos.	Name	Moving from
6 Aug 2010	30 Jun 2011	FW	(Senegal) Mame Biram Diouf	(England) Manchester United
14 Jan 2011	30 Jun 2011	FW	(Paraguay) Roque Santa Cruz	(England) Manchester City
16 Jan 2011	30 Jun 2011	MF	(United States) Jermaine Jones	(Germany) Schalke 04

==== Out ====
Date	Pos.	Name	To	Fee
May 2010	MF	(Republic of Ireland) Steven Reid	(England) West Bromwich Albion	Free
June 2010	FW	(England) Marcus Marshall	(England) Rotherham United	Free
June 2010	GK	(England) Josh Swann	Free agent	Free
June 2010	MF	(Turkey) Yıldıray Baştürk	Free agent	Free
June 2010	DF	(England) Michael Hall	(England) Accrington Stanley	Free
July 2010	MF	(England) Andy Haworth	(England) Bury	Free
Aug 2010	DF	(Northern Ireland) Johnny Flynn	(Scotland) Ross County	Free
Aug 2010	DF	(Denmark) Lars Jacobsen	(England) West Ham United	Free
Jan 2011	MF	(England) Alex Marrow	(England) Crystal Palace	Undisclosed
Dec 2010	FW	(England) Jason Banton	Free agent	N/A
Dec 2010	FW	(Paraguay) Julio Santa Cruz	Free agent	N/A
Jan 2011	MF	(Republic of Ireland) Alan Judge	(England) Notts County	Undisclosed
Jan 2011	DF	(France) Pascal Chimbonda	Free agent	Released by mutual consent

Total income: ▲ Undisclosed (nominal)

==== Loan out ====
From	To	Pos.	Name	Moving to
13 August 2010	1 January 2011	FW	(England) Nick Blackman	(Scotland) Motherwell
21 August 2010	3 January 2011	DF	(England) Alex Marrow	(England) Crystal Palace
31 August 2010	30 June 2011	DF	(Georgia (country)) Zurab Khizanishvili	(England) Reading
31 August 2010	1 January 2011	MF	(Republic of Ireland) Alan Judge	(England) Notts County
31 August 2010	30 June 2011	FW	(Netherlands) Maceo Rigters	(Netherlands) Willem II
September 2010	4 February 2011	GK	(England) Jake Kean	(England) Hartlepool United
11 September 2010	15 November 2010	GK	(Wales) Jason Brown	(England) Leeds United
November 2010	31 January 2011	DF	(Republic of Ireland) Gavin Gunning	(England) Bury
19 November 2010	19 December 2010	GK	(Wales) Jason Brown	(England) Leyton Orient
7 January 2011	14 January 2011	MF	(Republic of Ireland) Alan Judge	(England) Notts County
13 January 2011	30 June 2011	MF	(Algeria) Amine Linganzi	(England) Preston North End
13 January 2011	30 June 2011	FW	(England) Nick Blackman	(Scotland) Aberdeen
25 January 2011	30 June 2011	MF	(Republic of Ireland) Aaron Doran	(Scotland) Inverness Caledonian Thistle
28 January 2011	30 June 2011	DF	(Republic of Ireland) Gavin Gunning	(Scotland) Motherwell
31 January 2011	30 June 2011	MF	(Senegal) El Hadji Diouf	(Scotland) Rangers
25 February 2011	30 June 2011	GK	(England) Frank Fielding	(England) Derby County
3 March 2011	3 April 2011	GK	(Wales) Jason Brown	(Wales) Cardiff City
17 March 2011	30 June 2011	FW	(England) Zac Aley	(England) Morecambe
24 March 2011	30 June 2011	MF	(England) Jason Lowe	(England) Oldham Athletic
