= History of Blackburn Rovers F.C. =

History of an English football club

The history of Blackburn Rovers Football Club, an English football club based in Blackburn, Lancashire, dates back to the club's formation in 1875.

== The early years ==
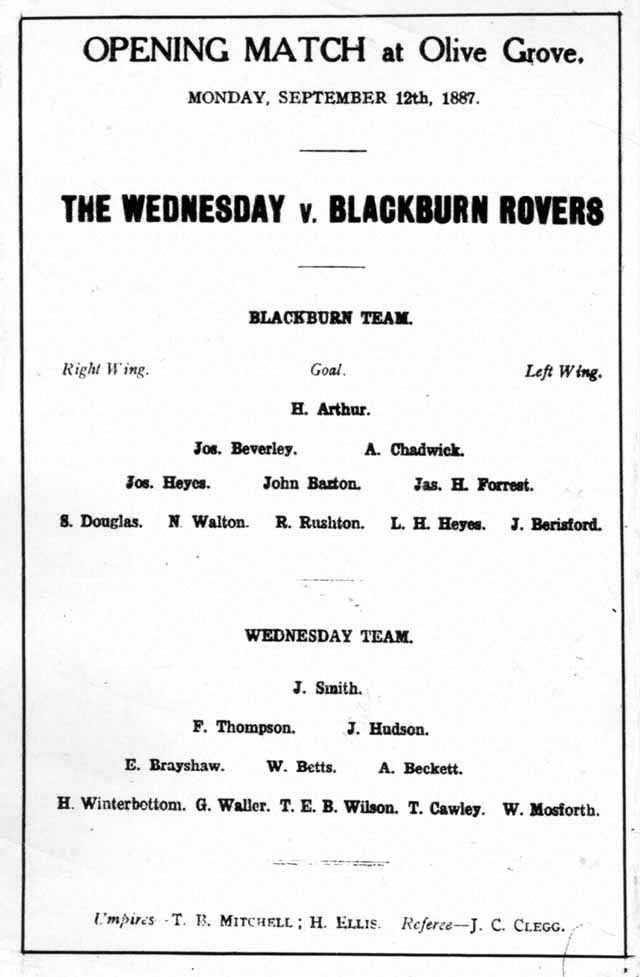
Leaflet advertising a Blackburn Rovers match on 12 September 1887 against 'The Wednesday' at Olive Grove.

The first match played by Blackburn Rovers took place in Church, Lancashire on 11 December 1875.

On 28 September 1878, Blackburn Rovers became one of 23 clubs to form the Lancashire Football Association. On 1 November 1879 the club played in the FA Cup for the first time, beating the Tyne Association Football Club 5–1. Rovers were eventually put out of the competition in the third round after suffering a heavy 6–0 defeat by Nottingham Forest.

During the 1881–82 season, the club continued to rent the facilities at Alexandra Meadows, but began to look towards a move elsewhere. As the leading club in the area, it was felt that Rovers needed its own ground. A ground was leased at Leamington Street and £500 was spent on a new grandstand capable of seating 600–700 spectators. Boards were placed around the pitch to help prevent a repeat of the crowd troubles with Darwen F.C. (1870), and a large ornate entrance arch was erected bearing the name of the club and ground.

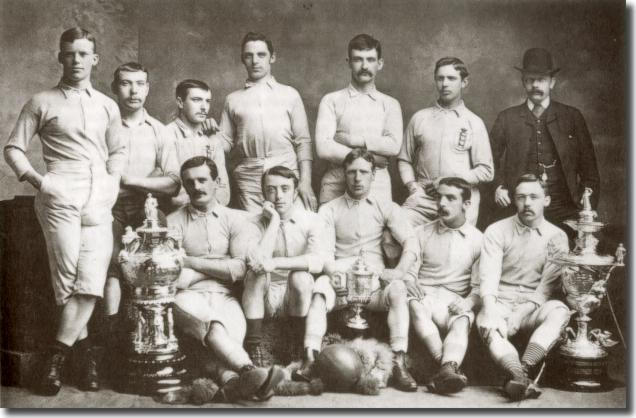
Blackburn Rovers cup winners in 1883–84. The first FA Cup win for the team. The photograph includes the East Lancashire Charity Cup; the FA Cup and the Lancashire Cup. Back row (left to right): J. M. Lofthouse, H. McIntrye, J. Beverly, Kurt Edwards, F. Suter, J. Forrest, R. Birtwistle (umpire) Front row (left to right): J. Douglas, J. E. Sowerbutts, J. Brown, G. Avery, J. Hargreaves.

In 1882 they lost in the FA Cup final against the Old Etonians.

Rovers won the FA Cup in 1884 with a 2–1 victory over Scottish side Queens Park (Glasgow). The same teams met in the final the next season, with Blackburn Rovers winning 2–0. Rovers won the FA Cup again in 1886, defeating West Bromwich Albion after a replay.

== The Football League and Ewood Park ==
On 2 March 1888, William McGregor, a Birmingham shopkeeper and a committee member of Aston Villa Football Club, sent a letter to five clubs – Blackburn Rovers among them – suggesting that twelve of the leading clubs should organise a series of home and away matches between themselves. With the introduction of professional players, it seemed natural that better organisation should be brought to the complex and chaotic system of friendly and competitive matches prevalent at the time. On 22 March 1888 John Birtwistle represented Blackburn Rovers at a meeting of a number of clubs at the Anderton Hotel in London. This meeting, and subsequent ones, led to the creation of the Football League, with Blackburn Rovers as part of it. Rovers finished the inaugural season of the league in fourth place, and unbeaten at home.

Blackburn Rovers again reached the FA Cup final on 29 March 1890 at the Kennington Oval. The club claimed the trophy, for the fourth time, by beating Sheffield Wednesday 6–1.

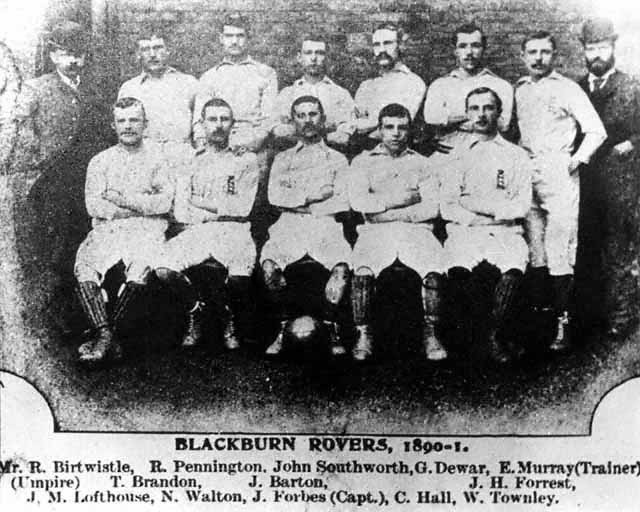
FA Cup winning side of the 1890–91 season

The 1890–1891 season saw Blackburn Rovers win the FA Cup for fifth time against Notts County F.C. with a 3–1 victory.

== Early 20th century ==
Blackburn were league champions in 1912 and 1914, and FA Cup winners in 1928. The FA Cup triumph would prove to the club's last major trophy for 67 years.

== Mid 20th century ==
When the league resumed after World War II, Blackburn Rovers were relegated in their second season (1947–48) and remained in the second division for the following ten years. After promotion in 1958, they were regularly a mid-table side as they had been for much of the time since their most recent league title win in 1914. During this time, they seldom made a serious challenge for a major trophy – although they did reach the 1960 FA Cup final when managed by Scot Dally Duncan. Rovers lost this game 3–0 to Wolverhampton Wanderers after playing most of the game with only 10 men on the field. Full back Dave Whelan was lost during the game to a broken leg, the game being played in the days before substitutes were allowed. Despite losing, cup final man of the match was future Scotland manager Ally MacLeod (left winger MacLeod scored 47 goals in 193 appearances for Rovers). During the 1950s and 1960s Blackburn Rovers had several players who made were selected for national teams. They were again relegated from the First Division in 1966 and would not return to the top flight for the next 26 years.

== 1970s and 1980s ==
Blackburn dropped to new lows in the 1970s, being relegated to the Third Division twice during the decade. Their relegation in 1971 was followed by a four-year wait for promotion, when they won the Third Division title in 1975. Relegation in 1979 was followed by instant promotion under new player-manager Howard Kendall, who later managed Everton to silverware including two league titles.

In 1988–89 they reached the Second Division playoff final in its last-ever season of the home-away two-legged format – but lost to Crystal Palace. In 1989–90 they lost in the Second Division play-off semi-finals. By this stage, the club had started to receive funding from local steel baron Jack Walker, whose financial support had enabled the construction of a new stand at Ewood Park as well as several new signings. By 1991, he had full control of the club and enabled more major signings, as well as appointing Kenny Dalglish as manager.

== 1990s ==
In 1991–92, they reached the play-off final at Wembley where they beat Leicester City 1–0 thanks to a Mike Newell penalty.

Rovers made headlines in the summer of 1992 by paying an English record fee of £3.6million for the Southampton and England centre forward Alan Shearer. fighting off competition for his signature from the likes of Liverpool and Manchester United. They remained in the title challenge for most of the season before finishing fourth in the final table. In 1993–94, they were Premiership runners-up to Manchester United. Rovers broke the English transfer fee record again in the summer of 1994 when paying Norwich City £5million for 21-year-old striker Chris Sutton.

Blackburn won the Premier League in 1995 – their first league title for 81 years and their first major trophy for 67 years.

Kenny Dalglish moved upstairs to the position of Director of Football soon after the title triumph, and was succeeded as manager by his assistant Ray Harford, who guided Blackburn to a seventh place finish in 1996.

Alan Shearer was sold to hometown club Newcastle United for a then world record fee of £15million in the summer of 1996.

Rovers failed to win in their opening 10 games of the 1996–97 Premiership and Harford resigned.

Long-serving coach Tony Parkes took over as manager of Blackburn until the end of the 1996–97 season, when Roy Hodgson was appointed. Blackburn finished sixth under Hodgson in 1998, but he was sacked in November 1998 with Blackburn battling against relegation. His successor Brian Kidd was unable to prevent Blackburn from being relegated, and he was sacked in November 1999. Tony Parkes once again took temporary charge of the Blackburn first team, spending four months at the helm this time, before Graeme Souness accepted the offer to manage the club in March 2000.

== The new millennium ==
Blackburn's benefactor Jack Walker died in August 2000, and nine months later promotion back to the Premier League was achieved.

In 2001–02 Blackburn won their first-ever League Cup by beating Tottenham Hotspur 2–1 at the Millennium Stadium in Cardiff. Despite being in the depth of the relegation battle at the time, their league form recovered in the final stages of the season and they finished 10th.

Blackburn peaked during the first decade of the 21st century by finishing sixth in the Premier League under Graeme Souness in 2003 and again in 2006 under his successor Mark Hughes. They also enjoyed several more good cups runs, including FA Cup semi-final appearances in 2005 and 2007.

After qualifying for Europe, Rovers signed South African striker Benni McCarthy from FC Porto as a replacement for the departed Craig Bellamy. Rovers finished top of their European group and were drawn against Bayer Leverkusen, losing 3–2 on aggregate. The club was busy during the January transfer window, signing David Dunn, Stephen Warnock, Christopher Samba and Bruno Berner. Leaving the squad were Dominic Matteo, Andy Taylor (loan), Joe Garner (loan), Lucas Neill and Jay McEveley. In cup competitions, Rovers were knocked out of the Carling Cup in the Third Round. They defeated Everton, Luton, Arsenal (after replay) and Manchester City in the FA Cup. Thereafter, they faced Chelsea for a place in the final, losing 2–1 when Michael Ballack scored Chelsea's winner in extra time.

Rovers finished the season 10th in the league, with McCarthy netting 18 league goals. The club also qualified for the Intertoto Cup and drew Lithuanian side FK Vetra of Vilnius.

To prepare for the 2007–08 season Rovers bought Roque Santa Cruz, Maceo Rigters and Gunnar Nielsen. In the January 2008 transfer window, Robbie Savage left for Derby in a £1.5m (rising to £2m) transfer to seek first team football. Rovers were never at any stage during the season outside the top ten and made their best start to a campaign for 10 years and Santa Cruz brilliantly shone scoring 23 goals in all competitions.

On 22 June 2008, it was announced by the club that Paul Ince had been brought in to manage Rovers after Mark Hughes left, signing a three-year deal. Ince was presented to the media on Tuesday 24 June. Ince's first job though as the Blackburn Manager is to persuade some of the players who wanted to follow Hughes or pursue other teams, to stay .

Ince's reign as Blackburn Rovers manager got off to the perfect start, with a 3–2 away win against Everton FC in the first game to the 2008–09 season. Blackburn drew 1–1 at home to Hull City before two heavy defeats to West Ham and Arsenal. They bounced back well and recorded back-to-back wins against Fulham and Newcastle United, but faded drastically: three draws and seven defeats, including five defeats in a row to saw Blackburn slip to 19th in the table after 16 games. This led to Ince coming under increasing pressure: he enjoyed some success in the Carling Cup, with wins over Everton and Sunderland. Eventually Ince paid the price for poor results, and a 3–0 defeat away to Wigan saw him sacked a few days later.

He was replaced by the former Bolton manager Sam Allardyce. Allardyce secured Premier League survival, and despite a difficult start to the 2009–10 season Rovers recovered well in the second half of the campaign to secure a comfortable 10th-place finish with 50 points – placing them 20 points clear of the relegation zone.

=== Since 2010 ===
In November 2010, the Indian company V H Group bought Blackburn Rovers under the name of Venky's London Limited for £23 million. The new owners immediately sacked manager Sam Allardyce and replaced him with first-team coach Steve Kean, initially on a temporary basis, but by January 2011 he had been awarded a full-time contract until June 2013. Kean's appointment was shrouded in a great deal of controversy since his agent Jerome Anderson had earlier played a major role in advising Venky's during the takeover of the club in the preceding months.

In December 2011, Blackburn Rovers posted an annual pre-tax loss of £18.6m for the year ending 30 June 2011. Despite this, the owners of Blackburn Rovers provided assurances over the continued funding of the club, even if they were relegated.

On 7 May 2012, the club was relegated to the Championship after being defeated at home by Wigan Athletic in the penultimate game of the season, ending eleven years in the Premier League.

At the start of the 2012–2013 season, Steve Kean, the manager in charge for the previous relegation season, was given a chance by owners to win promotion and kept his job as the manager. Ultimately though, pressure from the supporters who had been calling for the managers removal for months resulted in his resignation as manager on 29 September 2012. A succession of managers came and went over the next few seasons, with current manager Tony Mowbray arriving just before Blackburn were relegated to a League One in 2017. Promotion was achieved at the first attempt and Blackburn have remained in the Championship since.

Jon Dahl Tomasson took over as manager of Blackburn Rovers after Tony Mowbray stepped down at the end of the 2021/22 season.
