= Madapati Ramachandra Rao =

Madapati Ramachandra Rao (born 30 November 1963) is the Managing Director and Chief Executive Officer of Bharat Financial Inclusion Limited. Having joined Bharat Financial Inclusion as Chief Operating Officer in October 2006, he became the MD and CEO four years later.

Prior to BFIL, he was associated with ING Vysya Life Insurance, American Express, Standard Chartered Bank and Esanda Finanz & Leasing Limited. BFIL has expanded its network from 155 branches to nearly 2,000, and the number of borrowers served by the company has increased nearly 20-fold.
