= IndusInd Bank =

Indian private sector bank

IndusInd Bank Limited
- Type: Public
- Traded as: NSE: INDUSINDBK; BSE: 532187; LuxSE: IDUSB
- Industry: Financial services
- Founded: April 1994 (32 years ago)
- Founder: S. P. Hinduja
- Headquarters: Mumbai, Maharashtra, India
- Key people: Rajiv Anand (Managing Director & CEO)
- Products: Consumer banking; Commercial banking; Credit cards; Investment banking; Mortgage loans; Private banking; Private equity; Wealth management
- Revenue: ▼₹53,480 crore (US$5.7 billion) (2026)
- Operating income: ▼₹9,180 crore (US$980 million) (2026)
- Net income: ▼₹889 crore (US$95 million) (2026)
- Total assets: ▼₹543,394 crore (US$58 billion) (2026)
- Total equity: ▲₹62,867 crore (US$6.7 billion) (2026)
- Owner: Hinduja Group (16.29%)
- Number of employees: 49,449 (2026)
- Subsidiaries: BFIL
- Capital ratio: 15.31%
- Website: www.indusind.bank.in

IndusInd Bank Limited is an Indian banking and financial services company based in Mumbai. It was established in April 1994 and promoted by the Hinduja Group.

== History ==
IndusInd Bank was among nine 'new-generation'^{[a]} banks that obtained a banking license in 1994; it was started by S. P. Hinduja along with hundreds of NRI and other shareholders. Named after the Indus Valley Civilisation, the bank began its operations on 17 April 1994, after being inaugurated by the then Union Finance Minister Manmohan Singh. It launched its initial public offering in 1997.

In 2004, IndusInd Bank completed its merger with Ashok Leyland Finance, a vehicle financing company which was also part of the Hinduja Group.

IndusInd Bank listed on the Luxembourg Stock Exchange in 2007 by issuing global depository receipts (GDRs) worth ₹147 crore (US$35.55 million). In 2008, it issued fresh GDRs worth ₹222 crore (US$51.03 million).

In 2011, IndusInd Bank acquired Deutsche Bank India's loss-making credit cards division.

In October 2017, IndusInd Bank announced its acquisition of Bharat Financial Inclusion Limited (BFIL) for ₹15,000 crore (US$2.3 billion). The merger was officially completed in July 2019.

== Operations ==
As of 2026, the bank has 42 million customers, 3,137 branches, and 2,853 ATMs spread across India, covering 1,62,000 villages, Including foreign presence in Dubai and Abu Dhabi. It is an empaneled banker for MCX. Its shares have been a part of the NIFTY 50 index since 1 April 2013.

== Controversies ==
=== Derivative accounting discrepancies ===
Between 2023 and 2025, IndusInd Bank identified accounting irregularities related to its forex derivatives transactions, after a September 2023 directive from the Reserve Bank of India (RBI) mandated banks to adopt mark-to-market valuation for derivatives. An initial internal review estimated the potential financial impact at ₹1,572 crore in December 2023, which was revised upward to ₹2,361 crore by May 2024.

On 11 March 2025, IndusInd Bank's shares crashed over 27% after it disclosed the discrepancies, with analysts raising questions on the bank's internal controls. IndusInd Bank's Managing Director and CEO, Sumant Kathpalia, resigned in April 2025, taking "moral responsibility" for the discrepancies. His resignation followed that of Deputy CEO Arun Khurana, who stepped down a day earlier.

Independent audits were conducted by PwC and Grant Thornton, with Grant Thornton estimating a cumulative impact of approximately ₹1,960 crore. In April 2025, the bank reported a reduction in net worth of ₹1,979 crore, or 2.27%, following revaluation adjustments.

=== Insider trading investigation ===
After the accounting discrepancies came to light, reports stated that SEBI began investigating possible insider trading by senior officials of the bank. In May 2025, SEBI banned Kathpalia and four others from dealing in the share market, accusing them of selling shares before the bank publicly announced the losses and avoiding about ₹20 crore in losses. SEBI froze their accounts and barred them from trading while the investigation continued.

=== Microfinance Division Fraud ===
In May 2025, IndusInd Bank disclosed a suspected internal fraud in its microfinance division after discovering that ₹172.58 crore had been wrongly recorded as fee income across three quarters of FY25. The bank initiated legal and disciplinary actions against the involved employees following an internal investigation.

== See also ==
- Banking in India
- List of banks in India
- Indian Financial System Code

== Notes ==
^a The term 'new-generation' refers to banks established after the Reserve Bank of India issued updated licensing guidelines for new private sector banks in 1993.
