= Mikel John Obi =

Nigerian association football player

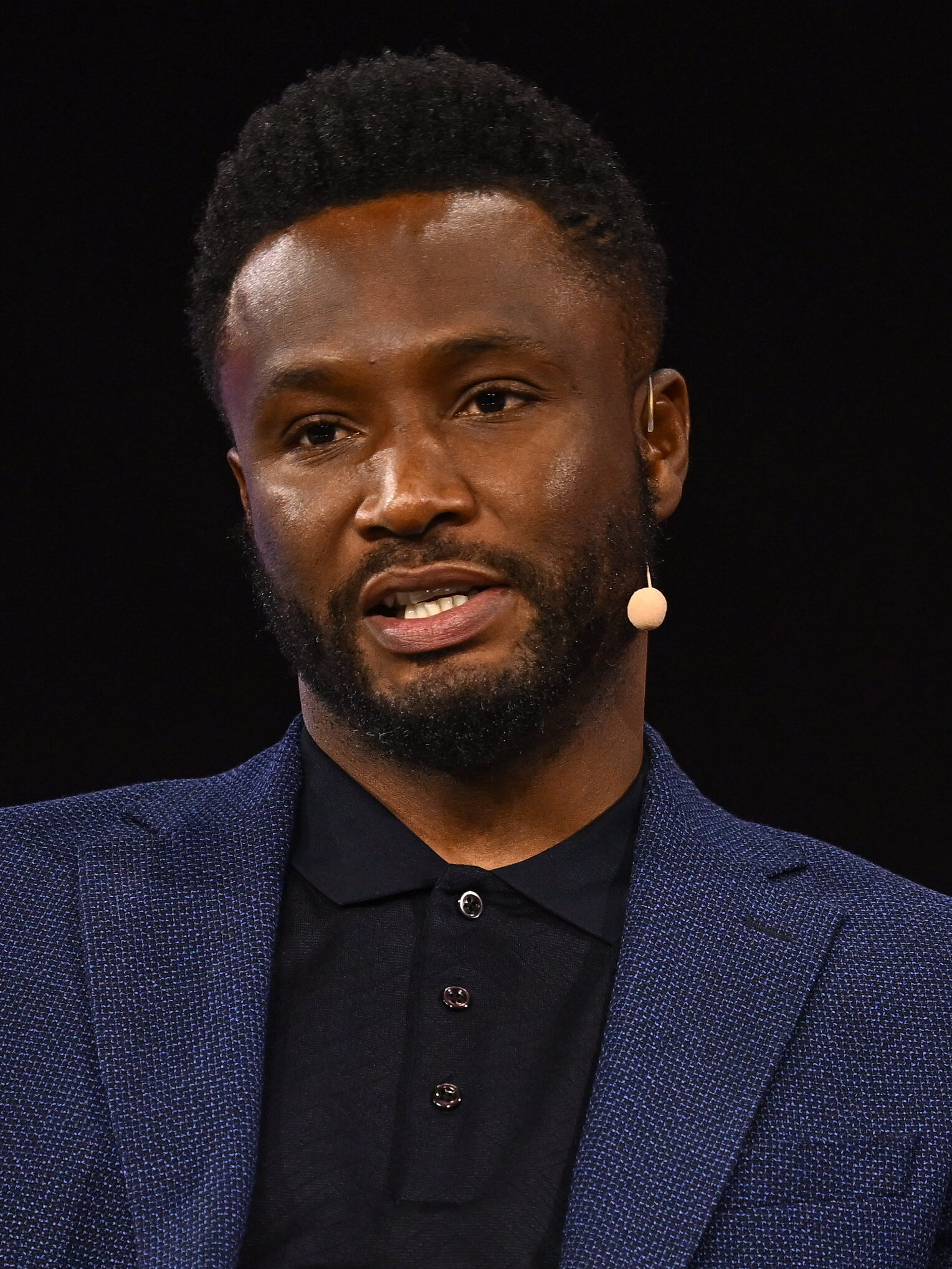
- Mikel in 2024

Personal information
- Full name: Mikel John Obi
- Birth name: John Michael Nchekwube Obinna
- Date of birth: 22 April 1987 (age 39)
- Place of birth: Jos, Nigeria
- Height: 1.88 m (6 ft 2 in)
- Position: Defensive midfielder

Youth career
- 2002–2004: Plateau United

Senior career*
Years	Team	Apps	(Gls)
2004–2006	Lyn	6	(1)
2006–2017	Chelsea	249	(1)
2017–2018	Tianjin TEDA	31	(3)
2019	Middlesbrough	18	(1)
2019–2020	Trabzonspor	19	(0)
2020–2021	Stoke City	39	(0)
2021	Kuwait SC	0	(0)
Total		362	(6)

International career
2016	Nigeria Olympic	6	(1)
2005–2019	Nigeria	91	(6)
Medal record
Men's football
Representing Nigeria
Africa Cup of Nations
Winner	2013 South Africa
Third place	2006 Egypt
Third place	2010 Angola
Third place	2019 Egypt
Olympic Games
Bronze medal – third place	2016 Rio de Janeiro	Team
- * Club domestic league appearances and goals

Mikel John Obi ( MON; born John Michael Nchekwube Obinna; 22 April 1987), also known as John Obi Mikel, is a Nigerian former professional footballer who played as a defensive midfielder.

Mikel began his career with local club Plateau United, before joining Norwegian club Lyn at the age of 17 in 2004. In 2006, he made a controversial transfer to English club Chelsea after Manchester United claimed they had already signed him.

He stayed with Chelsea for 11 years where he won multiple titles, including two Premier League titles, four FA Cups, and the 2011–12 Champions League. After leaving Chelsea, he had brief stints at Tianjin TEDA, Middlesbrough, Trabzonspor, Stoke City and Kuwait SC.

In a 14-year international career between 2005 and 2019, he played 91 times for Nigeria, scoring six goals. He went to five Africa Cup of Nations tournaments (winning in 2013), two World Cups, and won a bronze medal at the Olympics in 2016.

== Early life ==
Mikel was born in Jos, Plateau State. He is the son of Michael Obi, who runs an inter-state transport company in Jos. His father was a member of the Igbo ethnic group.

== Club career ==
=== Early career ===
Mikel started his football career at the age of 12, when picked as a talented footballer from over 3,000 young talents to play in Pepsi Football Academy, a team that at the time was well known for travelling across Nigeria scouting young footballers with the potential to play professionally.

Obi stood out to scouts and was later picked to play for top-flight club Plateau United, a side that had previously developed stars such as Celestine Babayaro, Victor Obinna and Chris Obodo, among others, that went on to success in European Leagues. Later known as John Obi Mikel, he made headlines for his country at the FIFA Under-17 World Championships held in Finland. Following the tournament, he went on to a trial at South Africa club Ajax Cape Town, ultimately joining Oslo-based club Lyn Fotball in Norway.

=== Transfer to England ===
Look, I wasn't really kidnapped. I was just staying away from the public eye making sure no one knew where I was. But there was a public announcement in Norway that, if anyone saw me, they should report it to the police, so we had to go and hide. Obviously, [Manchester] United were trying to get hold of me. So were Lyn. There were some tough times. It was like a movie.

— Mikel John Obi reflecting on his bizarre transfer saga.

On 29 April 2005, a few days after Mikel turned 18, Premier League club Manchester United announced that they had struck a deal with Lyn to sign him. United's website also claimed that they had done a deal directly with the teenager and that he had signed a contract to join them. Mikel's agents were bypassed as the club persuaded him to sign a four-year contract without representation. Lyn allegedly sent a fax to his agents abroad, claiming their services were no longer required by Mikel. Reports said the deal was initially worth £4 million, and would see Mikel arrive at Old Trafford in January 2006.

Chelsea, Manchester United's Premier League rival, later issued a counter-claim suggesting that they already had an agreement with Mikel and his agents, but Lyn denied this claim. Subsequent reports indicated that Chelsea claimed to have been involved in arranging the player's original move to Europe with a view to signing him at a later date. Further substance was added to this claim after it was revealed that the player had impressed Chelsea manager José Mourinho while training with the club's first-team squad during the summer of 2004.

Mikel expressed his delight at joining Manchester United in a hastily arranged press conference, where he was pictured holding up a United shirt bearing the squad number 21. Following his signing of the contract to join United, there were claims from Norway that he had received threatening phone calls from unknown sources. Mikel was assigned a security guard and moved to a safe hotel. On 11 May 2005 he went missing during a Norwegian Cup game against Klemetsrud; he had not been selected for the match but had been watching from the stands. Whilst he was believed to have left with one of his agents, John Shittu, who had by now flown in to meet Mikel, his disappearance sparked massive media coverage in Norway and also provoked a police enquiry after Lyn director Morgan Andersen made claims in the Norwegian media that Mikel had been "kidnapped". These claims were later repeated by Manchester United's assistant manager Carlos Queiroz, who accused Chelsea of being involved in the alleged "kidnapping".

It subsequently emerged that Mikel had travelled to London with Shittu, who was working for Jerome Anderson's SEM group. Manchester United manager Alex Ferguson considered travelling to Oslo to visit Mikel, but decided against this after Mikel was reported to have left the country. Staying in a London hotel and some nine days after disappearing, Mikel stated on Sky Sports News that he had been pressured into signing the contract with United without his agent present, claims rebuffed by both Manchester United and Lyn. Mikel told the British media that Chelsea were the club he genuinely wanted to sign for. In response to these events, United made a complaint to FIFA about the behaviour of both Chelsea and the player's agents, Shittu and Rune Hauge, already infamous for his role in the George Graham bungs scandal. FIFA dismissed these claims in August 2005, stating there was insufficient evidence to bring a case against Chelsea.

Following the tournament, Mikel failed to return to Lyn, and the club subsequently lodged a complaint with FIFA. On 12 August, FIFA ruled that Mikel should return to Lyn to fulfil the remainder of his contract with the club, whilst they would decide at a later date whether the contract he signed with United should be upheld or cancelled. After a delay of over a month, Mikel complied with the FIFA decision and returned to Lyn in early September 2005 after a three-month absence.

==== Transfer resolved ====
Rather than leaving FIFA to determine the validity of the contract signed with Manchester United, Chelsea intervened by volunteering to settle the transfer saga through negotiation with Lyn and Manchester United.

On 2 June 2006, the three clubs reached a settlement. Mikel's registration was to be transferred from Lyn to Chelsea, and Manchester United agreed to terminate their option agreement with him. Under the terms of the agreement, Chelsea agreed to pay United £12 million, half paid upon the finalisation of the contract and the other half in June 2007, and Lyn £4 million, half payable immediately and half in June 2007. As a result of this settlement, all claims in the matter were withdrawn. On 19 July, Chelsea were granted a work permit for Mikel after they completed the £16 million signing in June 2006.

In the aftermath of the transfer, Lyn director Morgan Andersen, who had a previous conviction for forging official documents, was convicted of fraud and making false accusations; he was given a one-year suspended jail sentence by an Oslo court. The court also ordered him to pay 20,000 kroner (£1,944) in costs. Chelsea made a High Court claim for £16 million against Lyn and Andersen following the conviction, claiming that the previously agreed settlement was not binding as "the transfer was based on a fraudulent misrepresentation, now proven by a court of law." This claim was subsequently resolved out of court.

=== Chelsea ===
==== 2006–07 season ====
On 12 September 2006, Mikel made his first start for Chelsea in the UEFA Champions League against Bulgarian club Levski Sofia and took a powerful shot which the goalkeeper failed to save and Didier Drogba pounced on the rebound. Mikel received many positive comments for his performance in the match. However, since being sent off in a match against Reading on 14 October 2006, Mikel was fined on three separate occasions by Chelsea for turning up late to training.

At the time, Chelsea manager José Mourinho was believed to have strong reservations about his lifestyle outside of Stamford Bridge, and the club were reportedly considering offloading the player. Mikel was dropped for over a month, during which his father Michael voiced his concerns over his son's behaviour. After improved punctuality and showings at training sessions, Mikel earned a recall for Chelsea's Champions League group stage away game against Werder Bremen on 23 November 2006. He scored his first goal for Chelsea in their 6–1 FA Cup victory over Macclesfield Town on 6 January 2007. He also scored against Nottingham Forest in the following round of the competition. During Chelsea's triumph in the League Cup final in 2007, Mikel was sent off in injury time (having come on as a substitute) after clashing with Kolo Touré. The incident was followed by a huge fracas, in which Touré and Emmanuel Adebayor of Arsenal were sent off, Cesc Fàbregas and Frank Lampard were booked and Mourinho and Arsène Wenger were involved in an altercation on the pitch.

In subsequent games, Mourinho deployed Mikel as a starter in a holding role in key games where he impressed greatly, notably in the Chelsea–Tottenham Hotspur FA Cup sixth round replay, the Champions League quarter-final games against Valencia, the Champions League semi-final games against Liverpool and also the victorious 2007 FA Cup Final against Manchester United. Mikel's height and great strength, allied to good ball control and an unusually wide range of passing, allows him not only to disrupt opposing attacks, but also to spread the play effectively. Mikel supplanted the French midfielder Claude Makélélé in the lineup following his departure to Paris Saint-Germain.

==== 2007–08 season ====
Mikel was sent-off for the third time in his career in September 2007, when referee Mike Dean dismissed him for a tackle on Manchester United defender Patrice Evra. Chelsea appealed against the red card, but the three-match suspension was upheld.

Mikel was also sent off in the semi-final of the League Cup against Everton for a challenge on Phil Neville. Despite this, he came back strongly to round off what has been a good first two seasons for him at Chelsea.

==== 2008–09 season ====
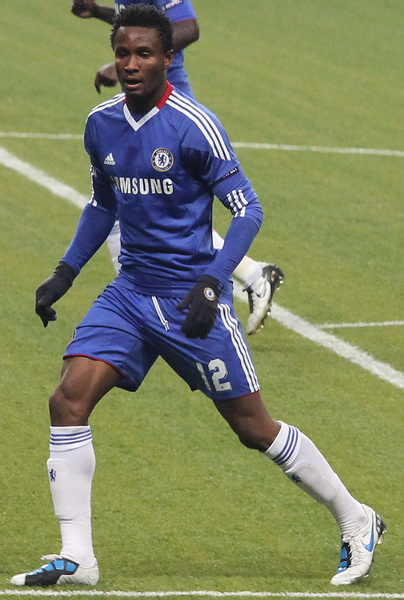
Mikel playing for Chelsea against Spartak Moscow

The summer of 2008 saw veteran defensive midfielder Claude Makélélé transferred to French club Paris Saint-Germain, leaving the defensive midfield position vacant. Throughout the 2008–09 season, Mikel saw a great deal of playing time due to an injury to Michael Essien. During this period of increased action, Mikel performed admirably in the role. His ever-improving game was praised by Chelsea manager Luiz Felipe Scolari, and his importance to the team was underlined when he provided the free kick that Salomon Kalou scored to equalise against Manchester United. He played so well in 2008–09 that he was nominated for the club player and young player of the season. On 24 January 2009, Mikel was charged with drunk driving, just hours before an FA Cup game against Ipswich Town – Mikel was not due to play in the game as he was serving a suspension. Although he had all that trouble on 22 July, Mikel signed a new five-year contract with Chelsea.

==== 2009–10 season ====
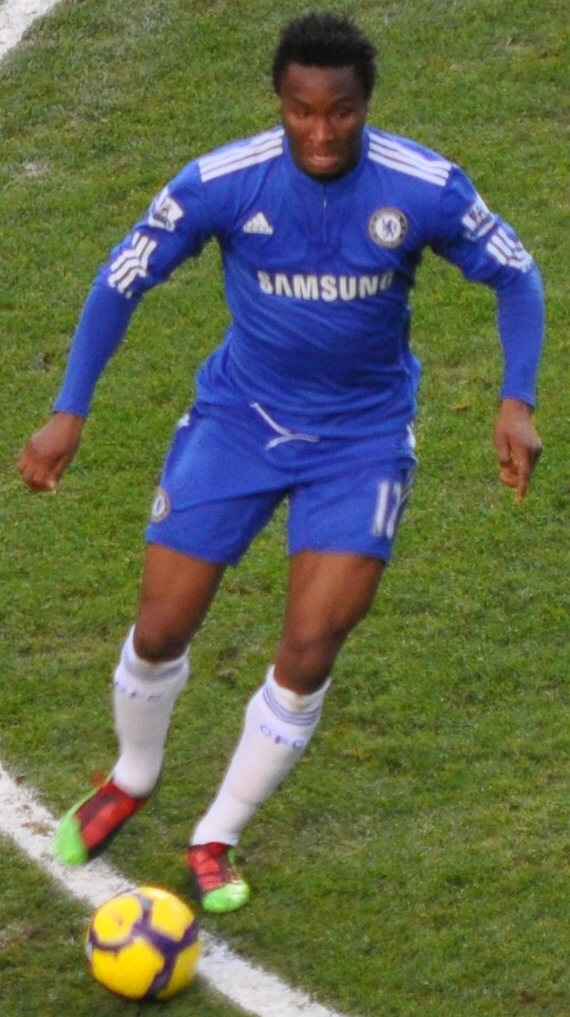
Mikel playing for Chelsea against Fulham on 28 December 2009

On 13 February 2010, Mikel provided the assist for Didier Drogba's goal as Chelsea beat Cardiff City 4–1 in the fifth round of the 2009–10 FA Cup. Mikel provided another assist for a Drogba goal in a 5–0 win over FA Cup finalists and relegated side Portsmouth on 24 March, as Chelsea cut United's lead at the top of the table to one point. Mikel played the full ninety minutes in Chelsea's 7–1 smashing of Aston Villa three days later as Chelsea kept pace in the title race with Manchester United. In their next Premier League game against United, Mikel played excellent as a marshall in midfield as Chelsea climbed above United in the table with a 2–1 win at Old Trafford, thanks to goals from Joe Cole and Drogba.

Under new manager Carlo Ancelotti, Mikel continued to perform with efficiency in his defensive midfield role, notching 35 appearances for the Blues. In May 2010, he received Premier League and FA Cup winner's medals as part of Chelsea's first ever league-cup double winning team.

==== 2010–11 season ====
Mikel and Chelsea started the new 2010–11 Premier League campaign where they left off from the 2009–10 season, playing strong defense and adding deadly finishing. Mikel played the full 90 and helped keep three clean-sheets in the first three games as Chelsea eased past West Bromwich Albion 6–0 on 14 August, crushed Wigan Athletic 6–0 at the DW Stadium seven days later and edged past Stoke City 2–0 on 28 August.

Mikel was the preferred option in defensive midfield as teammate Michael Essien spent most of the season on the sideline with knee injuries. The injury to the versatile Essien forced the club to play new signing Ramires more often in the second half of the season. Mikel featured in 28 Premier League campaigns for Chelsea as the London side finished in second place, nine points behind champions Manchester United. Following the disappointment of not winning a title, Chelsea manager Carlo Ancelotti was sacked by the club.

==== 2011–12 season ====
Before the start of their league campaign, Mikel's father was abducted in his native Nigeria on 10 August; despite this, Mikel started in the club's opening fixture against Stoke City at Britannia Stadium. Mikel came close to claiming his first Premier League goal for Chelsea in an inspired game as the sides played out a 0–0 draw in new coach André Villas-Boas' first game in charge.

Due to Essien's long-term knee injury, Mikel found more playing time, but around Christmas time lost his place to new signing Oriol Romeu. Following a run of disappointing fixtures, including a catastrophic 3–1 loss to Napoli in the Champions League round of 16 first leg and a 1–0 defeat to West Brom, Villas-Boas was sacked by Chelsea owner Roman Abramovich. In both of these matches, Mikel was an unused substitute for the Blues. Following the appointment of former Chelsea midfielder Roberto Di Matteo as interim head coach, Mikel appeared in 16 of the club's last 20 games and started in 14 of them, and began to play some of his best football for the club.

Mikel played the full 90 minutes in Chelsea's 2–1 victory over Liverpool in the 2012 FA Cup Final on 5 May 2012, picking up a yellow card in the 36th minute. The 2011–12 Premier League campaign saw Mikel appear in 22 league fixtures, starting 15 of them, as well as playing in eight fixtures leading up to the team's appearance in the 2012 UEFA Champions League Final against Bayern Munich.

In the final in Munich on 19 May, Mikel played the full 120 minutes as the sides played out a 1–1 draw. Chelsea played a tough defensive battle and Mikel was hailed by Sky Sports pundit Jamie Redknapp as playing an excellent game, putting in "a performance that I didn't think he had in him; he was putting out fires everywhere," as Chelsea claimed a 4–3 victory in the penalty shootout. Following his performance, Mikel told reporters that it was "best night of our lives." Mikel's strong performances in the final stages of the season and his impressive display in Munich helped Chelsea secure Champions League football next season despite finishing in sixth place, knocking London rivals Tottenham into the UEFA Europa League.

==== 2012–13 season ====
Mikel started all of Chelsea's first five games of the new 2012–13 Premier League season, and also played in the Community Shield against Manchester City and Super Cup against Atlético Madrid. In November, Mikel was named on the shortlist for the African Footballer of the Year along with former Chelsea teammate Didier Drogba.

Mikel was charged with misconduct by the Football Association (FA) on 22 November 2012. He was given a three-match ban and fined £60,000 for threatening referee Mark Clattenburg during a 3–2 defeat to Manchester United.

On 5 December 2012, Mikel signed a contract extension with Chelsea, keeping him at the club until 2017.

==== 2013–14 season ====
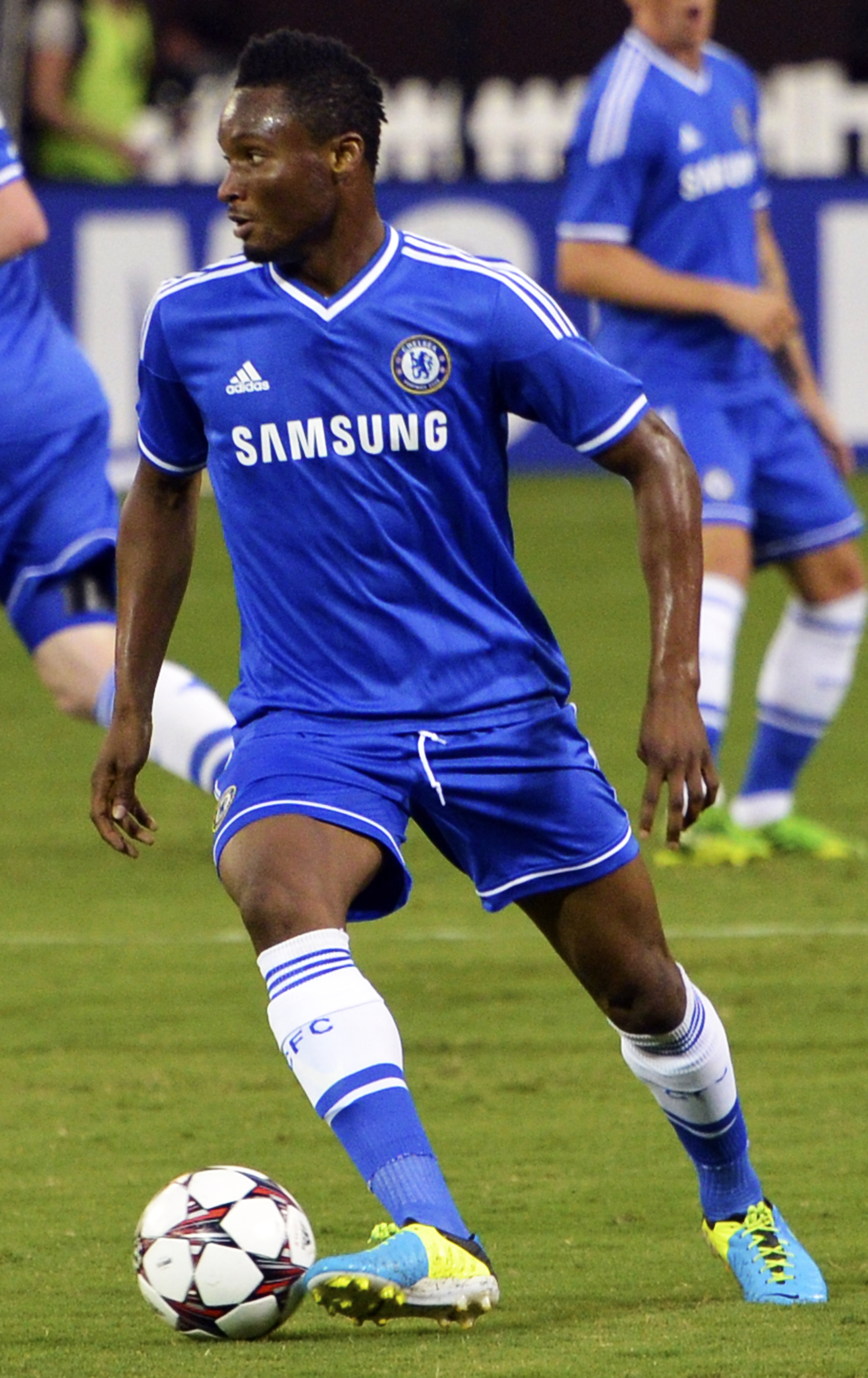
Mikel playing for Chelsea in 2013

On 21 September 2013, Mikel scored his first-ever Premier League goal in a 2–0 win against Fulham. He scored his second goal of the season in Chelsea's third round tie with Derby County on 5 January 2014, heading in the opening goal in an eventual 2–0 victory. He made his 200th Premier League appearance for Chelsea on 3 February, coming on as a late substitute in a 1–0 away victory at Manchester City.

==== 2014–15 season ====
On 30 August 2014, Mikel, who substituted Willian on the 75-minute mark, set up Diego Costa's second goal after intercepting up Muhamed Bešić's backheel pass. Chelsea went on to win 6–3 against Everton at Goodison Park. Mikel scored a rare goal against Sporting CP on 10 December in a 3–1 victory at Stamford Bridge in the 2014–15 Champions League.

==== 2015–16 season ====
Against Watford on Boxing Day 2015, in the first game of Guus Hiddink's second spell in charge, Mikel came on to become the 21st player to make 350 appearances for Chelsea. Chelsea then faced Paris Saint-Germain in the first leg of the UEFA Champions League round of 16. Mikel conceded a foul just outside the 18-yard box. PSG forward Zlatan Ibrahimović's free kick deflected off Mikel, who was part of the wall, and past goalkeeper Thibaut Courtois. Just a few minutes later, however, Mikel equalised from a stoppage time corner kick. Due to the injuries of John Terry and Gary Cahill, Mikel had to play as a centre-back in multiple games.

==== 2016–17 season ====
On 4 November 2016, it was announced that the club would not be renewing Mikel's contract when it expired at the end of the season.

=== Tianjin TEDA ===
On 6 January 2017, Chinese club Tianjin TEDA signed Mikel on a free transfer. On 14 April 2018, he scored his second league goal for Tianjin, and first goal of the season against Guangzhou R&F. He left Tianjin TEDA at the end of the 2018 Chinese Super League season in November 2018.

=== Middlesbrough ===
After two years in China, Mikel joined English Championship team Middlesbrough on a short-term deal in the 2019 winter transfer window. The 31-year-old was a free agent after leaving Chinese side Tianjin TEDA. Mikel made 19 appearances for Boro, scoring once against Rotherham United on 5 May 2019 as the team narrowly missed out on a play-off spot finishing seventh. He was released by Middlesbrough at the end of the 2018–19 season.

=== Trabzonspor ===
In the summer of 2019, Mikel joined Trabzonspor on a two-year contract with the option of a further year.

It was announced on 17 March 2020, that Mikel had left Trabzonspor by mutual consent, days after expressing his concerns about the Turkish Super Lig continuing amid the global coronavirus pandemic.

=== Stoke City ===
Mikel signed a one-year contract with EFL Championship side Stoke City on 17 August 2020. He made his Stoke debut on 13 September 2020 in a 0–0 draw away at Millwall. Under Michael O'Neill, Mikel was a key member of the team in 2020–21, making 41 appearances as Stoke finished in a mid-table position of 14th. At the end of the season O'Neill stated that he wanted Mikel to stay at Stoke for another year.

=== Kuwait SC and retirement ===
On 1 July 2021, Mikel cancelled his contract agreement with Stoke and moved to Kuwait SC.

On 4 November 2021, the contract with Kuwait SC was terminated after only four months of joining the team. On 27 September 2022, Mikel announced his retirement from professional football at the age of 35.

== International career ==
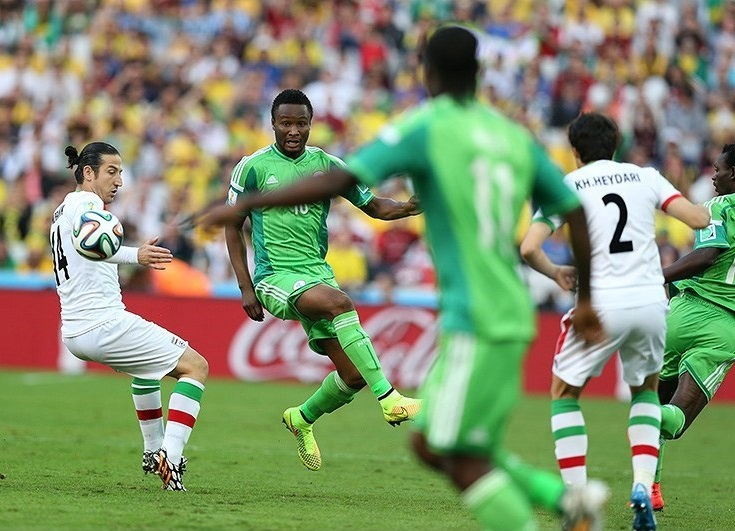
Mikel played 91 times for Nigeria; at the time of his retirement, only three players had done so more often.

Mikel represented the Nigeria under-20 team at the 2005 FIFA World Youth Championship and won the Silver Ball for the second-best player at the tournament (behind Lionel Messi) as the Nigerians finished runner-up to Argentina.

He made his debut for the Nigeria senior team on 17 August 2005, when he came on as a second-half substitute in a 1–0 friendly win over Libya. He did not play for the national team again prior to being named in the squad for the 2006 Africa Cup of Nations. In Nigeria's first group game, against Ghana, Mikel was an unused substitute. However, he was introduced into the second game against Zimbabwe early in the second half. Within ten minutes of coming on, he had supplied both the corner that resulted in Christian Obodo heading the game's opening goal, and scored Nigeria's second goal. He made his first international start in Nigeria's final group game, a 2–1 victory over Senegal.

In 2007, Mikel was suspended from all Nigerian national teams after manager Berti Vogts dropped him from the squad for the Africa Cup of Nations qualifier against Niger for failing to attend their previous match against Uganda. Mikel cited an injury, but because he did not attend an independent check by Nigerian officials, he was dropped. This, and his refusal to play for the Nigerian under-23 side, resulted in his suspension by the Nigeria Football Federation. After apologising, he was called up to the national squad for the 2008 Africa Cup of Nations in Ghana. At the tournament, he scored one goal and registered one assist in a match against Benin to help Nigeria qualify for the quarter-finals against hosts Ghana, where they lost 2–1 to their West African rivals.

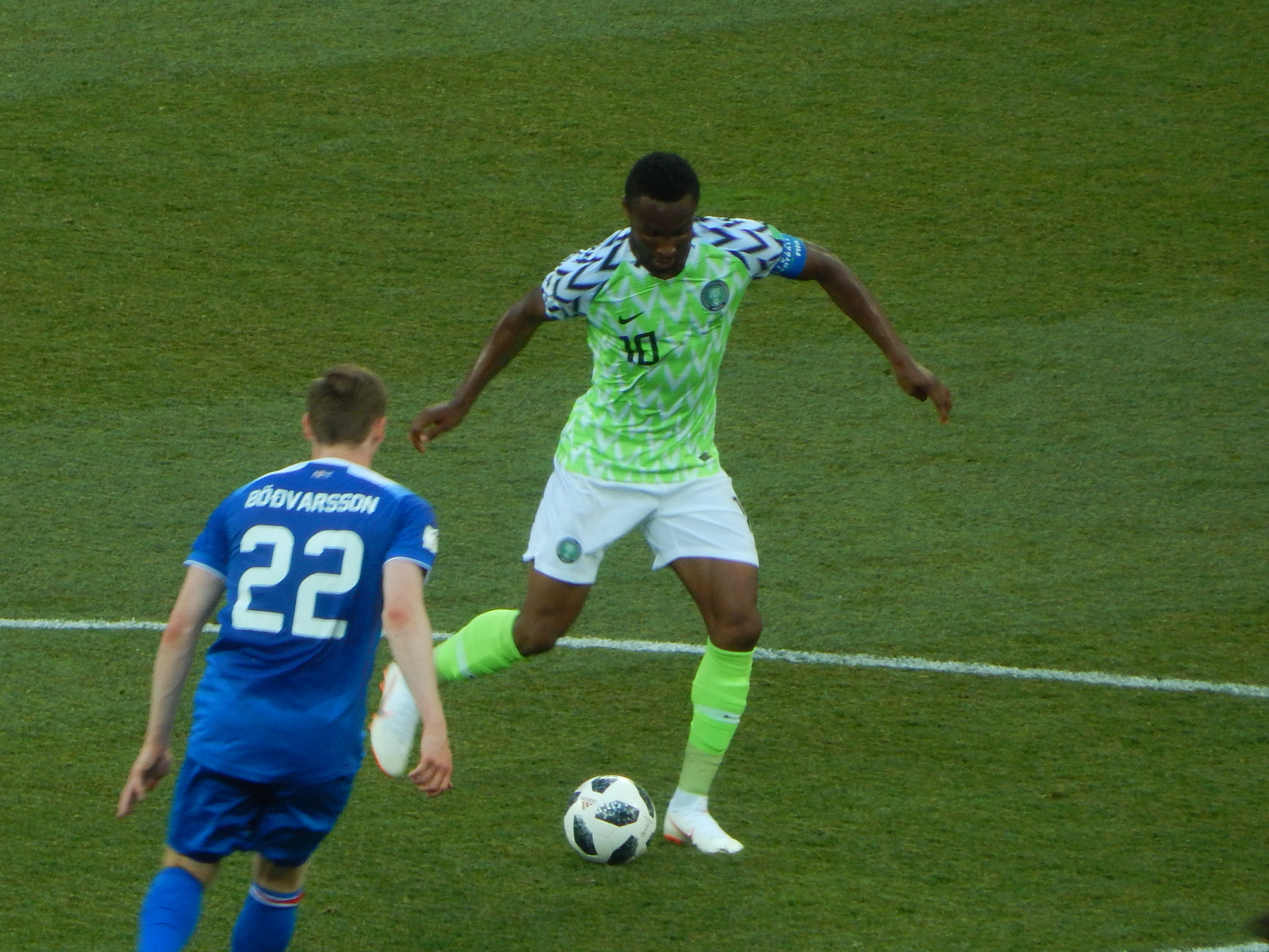
Mikel appeared at two FIFA World Cups: in 2014 and 2018 (pictured against Iceland in 2018).

Mikel had been called up for the under-23 side in preparation of the team's last Olympic qualifier on 26 March 2008, needing a win to qualify. His failure to show up for any of the qualifiers again setting off some controversy with the U23 team coach Samson Siasia, who dropped him from the Olympic squad amidst significant furor from the media.

On 5 June 2010, Mikel was ruled out of the 2010 FIFA World Cup in South Africa due to injury. He had been struggling to recover from a knee problem after undergoing surgery in May, though there were also reports that an ankle injury was to blame for Mikel's withdrawal.

At the 2013 Africa Cup of Nations, Mikel was a key player for Nigeria as they went on to win their third continental title. He was named by the Confederation of African Football (CAF) in the team of the tournament alongside teammates Vincent Enyeama, Efe Ambrose, Victor Moses and Emmanuel Emenike.

Mikel made his FIFA World Cup debut at the 2014 tournament in Brazil, earning a man of the match award in the Super Eagles' opening game against Iran. He helped the team to reach the knockout stage for the first time since 1998.

He was selected by Nigeria for their 35-man provisional squad for the 2016 Summer Olympics and was later named captain of the Olympics squad. On 13 August 2016, Mikel scored his first ever Olympic goal in a 2–0 win against Denmark to advance to the semi-final. After the 2–0 defeat to Germany, Nigeria went on to the bronze medal match against Honduras. On 20 August, Mikel helped Nigeria to the bronze medal in a 3–2 victory over Honduras. Nigeria became the first ever country to win all three medals at the Olympic Games with the 1996 squad winning the gold and 2008 squad winning the silver.

In a 2018 FIFA World Cup qualification match against Algeria, Mikel scored a goal and assisted his Chelsea teammate Victor Moses in a 3–1 victory.

In July 2019, Mikel said that the 2019 Africa Cup of Nations would be his last tournament for Nigeria. He retired at the end of the competition, in which Nigeria came third.

== Personal life ==
During preparations for the 2003 FIFA U-17 World Championship, the Nigerian Football Association (NFA) mistakenly submitted "Michael" as "Mikel" for the tournament in Finland. He decided to keep the new name, saying that it had a "special ring to it". He was most commonly referred to as "John Obi Mikel" upon his arrival at Chelsea, but on 31 July 2006, he stated that he prefers to be called Mikel John Obi instead, and he officially changed his name to Mikel John Obi in 2016.

On 18 June 2021, the Nigerian Minister of Youth Sports Development, Sunday Akin Dare, announced the appointment of Obi as the country's Youth Ambassador.

On 12 August 2011, Mikel's father, Michael Obi, was the victim of a suspected kidnapping in Nigeria. Mikel was informed before Chelsea's match against Stoke City two days later but opted to play despite his concerns for his father's well-being. On 15 August 2011, Mikel made an impassioned plea for his father's safe return. He told Sky Sports News, "I've always tried to help the country, this is the time for the country to help me, whoever knows where my dad is should please contact me." Michael Obi was found alive on 22 August 2011, in the Nigerian city of Kano. His abductors were reported to be in police custody. On 26 June 2018, a few hours before a World Cup match, Mikel was informed of another kidnapping of Michael Obi, but did not tell any of his team members. The Enugu State Police stated that they rescued Michael Obi on 2 July after a gunfight.

== Career statistics ==
=== Club ===
Appearances and goals by club, season and competition
Club	Season	League			National cup (Note: Includes FA Cup)		League cup (Note: Includes Football League Cup)		Continental		Other		Total	
Club	Season	Division	Apps	Goals	Apps	Goals	Apps	Goals	Apps	Goals	Apps	Goals	Apps	Goals
Lyn	2004	Tippeligaen	4	0	0	0	—		—		—		4	0
Lyn	2005	Tippeligaen	2	1	0	0	—		—		—		2	1
Lyn	2006	Tippeligaen	0	0	0	0	—		—		—		0	0
Lyn	Total		6	1	0	0	—		—		—		6	1
Chelsea	2006–07	Premier League	22	0	6	2	4	0	9 (Note: Appearances in UEFA Champions League)	0	1 (Note: Appearances in FA Community Shield)	0	42	2
Chelsea	2007–08	Premier League	29	0	2	0	3	0	4	0	1	0	39	0
Chelsea	2008–09	Premier League	34	0	5	0	1	0	9	0	—		49	0
Chelsea	2009–10	Premier League	25	0	3	0	2	0	4	0	1	0	35	0
Chelsea	2010–11	Premier League	28	0	2	0	0	0	6	0	1	0	37	0
Chelsea	2011–12	Premier League	22	0	5	0	1	0	9	0	—		37	0
Chelsea	2012–13	Premier League	22	0	3	0	1	0	9 (Note: Five appearances in UEFA Champions League and four in UEFA Europa League)	0	3 (Note: One appearance in FA Community Shield, one appearance in FIFA Club World Cup, one appearance in UEFA Super Cup)	0	38	0
Chelsea	2013–14	Premier League	24	1	2	1	2	0	7	0	1 (Note: Appearance in UEFA Super Cup)	0	36	2
Chelsea	2014–15	Premier League	18	0	2	0	4	0	2	1	—		26	1
Chelsea	2015–16	Premier League	25	0	2	0	2	0	4	1	0	0	33	1
Chelsea	2016–17	Premier League	0	0	0	0	0	0	—		—		0	0
Chelsea	Total		249	1	32	3	20	0	63	2	8	0	372	6
Tianjin TEDA	2017	Chinese Super League	13	1	0	0	—		—		—		13	1
Tianjin TEDA	2018	Chinese Super League	18	2	0	0	—		—		—		18	2
Tianjin TEDA	Total		31	3	0	0	—		—		—		31	3
Middlesbrough	2018–19	Championship	18	1	1	0	0	0	—		—		19	1
Trabzonspor	2019–20	Süper Lig	19	0	0	0	—		5 (Note: Appearances in UEFA Europa League)	0	—		24	0
Stoke City	2020–21	Championship	39	0	1	0	1	0	—		—		41	0
Kuwait SC	2021–22	Kuwait Premier League	0	0	0	0	0	0	2 (Note: Appearances in AFC Cup)	0	—		2	0
Career total			362	6	34	3	21	0	70	2	8	0	495	11

=== International ===
Appearances and goals by national team and year
National team	Year	Apps	Goals
Nigeria	2006	5	1
Nigeria	2007	4	0
Nigeria	2008	8	1
Nigeria	2009	5	0
Nigeria	2010	8	0
Nigeria	2011	8	0
Nigeria	2012	2	1
Nigeria	2013	17	1
Nigeria	2014	13	0
Nigeria	2015	3	0
Nigeria	2016	5	1
Nigeria	2017	4	1
Nigeria	2018	5	0
Nigeria	2019	4	0
Total		91	6

Scores and results list Nigeria's goal tally first, score column indicates score after each Obi goal.

List of international goals scored by Mikel John Obi
No.	Date	Venue	Opponent	Score	Result	Competition	Ref.
1	27 January 2006	Port Said Stadium, Port Said, Egypt	Zimbabwe	2–0	2–0	2006 Africa Cup of Nations	
2	29 January 2008	Sekondi-Takoradi Stadium, Sekondi-Takoradi, Ghana	Benin	1–0	2–0	2008 Africa Cup of Nations	
3	13 October 2012	U. J. Esuene Stadium, Calabar, Nigeria	Liberia	4–0	6–1	2013 Africa Cup of Nations qualification	
4	20 June 2013	Arena Fonte Nova, Salvador, Brazil	Uruguay	1–1	1–2	2013 FIFA Confederations Cup	
5	12 November 2016	Godswill Akpabio International Stadium, Uyo, Nigeria	Algeria	2–0	3–1	2018 FIFA World Cup qualification	
6	1 September 2017	Godswill Akpabio International Stadium, Uyo, Nigeria	Cameroon	2–0	4–0	2018 FIFA World Cup qualification	

== Honours ==
Chelsea

- Premier League: 2009–10, 2014–15
- FA Cup: 2006–07, 2008–09, 2009–10, 2011–12
- Football League Cup: 2006–07, 2014–15; runner-up: 2007–08
- FA Community Shield: 2009
- UEFA Champions League: 2011–12; runner-up: 2007–08
- UEFA Europa League: 2012–13
- FIFA Club World Cup runner-up: 2012

Nigeria

- Africa Cup of Nations: 2013; third place: 2006, 2010, 2019

Nigeria Olympic

- Summer Olympics bronze medalist: 2016

Nigeria U20

- FIFA World Youth Championship silver medalist: 2005

Individual

- FIFA World Youth Championship Silver Ball: 2005
- CAF Most Promising Talent of the Year: 2005
- Chelsea Young Player of the Year: 2007, 2008
- CAF Team of the Year: 2005, 2013
- Africa Cup of Nations Team of the Tournament: 2013
- African Footballer of the Year runner-up: 2013

Orders

- Member of the Order of the Niger
