= National Egg Coordination Committee =

Association of poultry farmers in India

National Egg Co-ordination Committee
- Founder: Banda Vasudev Rao
- Established: May 1982
- Chair: Banda Vasudev Rao
- Slogan: "Sunday ho ya Monday Roz khao Ande" (Sunday or Monday but take egg daily)
- Location: India
- Website: www.e2necc.com

The National Egg Co-ordination Committee (NECC) is a non-governmental public Charitable Trust established by Dr. B.V. Rao in May 1982 for the welfare of poultry farmers in India. The trust has more than 35,000 members. It publishes daily and monthly average egg prices for various production centers. These prices serve as indicative benchmarks but are not legally binding.

== Objectives ==
The NECC's role in the Indian egg industry mainly focuses on egg pricing, with stated objectives including:

- Determining egg prices based on a fair return for farmers, a decent margin for middlemen, and a reasonable cost for customers.
- Monitoring, managing, and regulating the stocks from surplus regions to deficit regions.
- Market intervention through Agrocorpex India Limited.
- Having a network of marketers who utilize multi-level marketing to sell the products.
- Promoting egg trade, egg farms, and egg exports.
- Making technology and information available to increase egg production.

== History ==
The Indian poultry industry suffered a series of crises in the early 1980s, due to the sale price dropping below production costs. Many poultry farmers shut down operations due to heavy financial losses. A group of farmers traveled across the country organizing over 300 meetings with groups, individuals, and traders with the objective of uniting poultry farmers from all over India. In May 1982, the NECC was formally registered as a trust under the Indian Societies Registration Act and, on 14 May 1982, the NECC started setting egg prices.
