= Zac Aley =

English footballer (born 1991)

Personal information
- Full name: Zachery George Aley
- Date of birth: 17 August 1991 (age 35)
- Place of birth: Fazakerley, England
- Positions: Defender; midfielder

Youth career
- 2007–2008: Southport

Senior career*
Years	Team	Apps	(Gls)
2008–2010	Southport	35	(14)
2010–2012	Blackburn Rovers	0	(0)
2011	→ Morecambe (loan)	7	(3)
2011	→ Southport (loan)	15	(6)
2012	→ Macclesfield Town (loan)	1	(0)
2012	Warrington Town	4	(2)
2012–2013	Ashton Town	1	(0)
2013	Skelmersdale United	0	(0)
2013–20??	Northwich Victoria		
2016–2020	Runcorn Linnets		
2020–2022	City of Liverpool		
- * Club domestic league appearances and goals as of 22:16, 10 March 2021 (UTC)

Zachery George Aley (born 17 August 1991) is a semi-professional footballer who plays for City of Liverpool as a midfielder. He played in the English Football League with Morecambe.

== Football career ==
Aley progressed through non-League club Southport's youth system before breaking into the first team, scoring on his league debut against Farsley Celtic. He gained BTECs and NVQs, as well as becoming a qualified referee whilst with the club. He signed for Premier League club Blackburn Rovers in March 2010, after a two-day trial.

He joined League Two club, Morecambe on loan for a month on 18 March 2011. Aley made his debut for Morecambe on 22 March, in the 2–1 home defeat against Macclesfield Town when he came on as a substitute for Kevan Hurst in the 75th minute.

Aley re-joined Conference National side Southport on an initial one-month loan on 21 October 2011. He went out on loan again at the end of that season, this time at Macclesfield Town. In the summer of 2012 Zac was released by Blackburn Rovers, Aley went on trial with Southport. On 14 September 2012, he joined Northern Premier League side Warrington Town on a free transfer, but left the club less than two months later in November 2012 by mutual consent. On 9 November 2012, Zac signed with Ashton Town in the North West Counties Football League. In October 2016, he signed for Runcorn Linnets. In December 2020, Aley signed for City of Liverpool.

== Club career statistics ==
As of match played 19 November 2011.

Club	Season	League		FA Cup		Other		Total	
Club	Season	Apps	Goals	Apps	Goals	Apps	Goals	Apps	Goals
Blackburn Rovers	2010–11	0	0	0	0	0	0	0	0
Blackburn Rovers	2011–12	0	0	0	0	0	0	0	0
Total		0	0	0	0	0	0	0	0
Morecambe (loan)	2010–11	7	3	0	0	0	0	7	3
Southport (loan)	2011–12	15	6	2	0	0	0	17	6
Career total		22	9	2	0	0	0	24	9
