= Steve Kean =

Scottish football player and manager

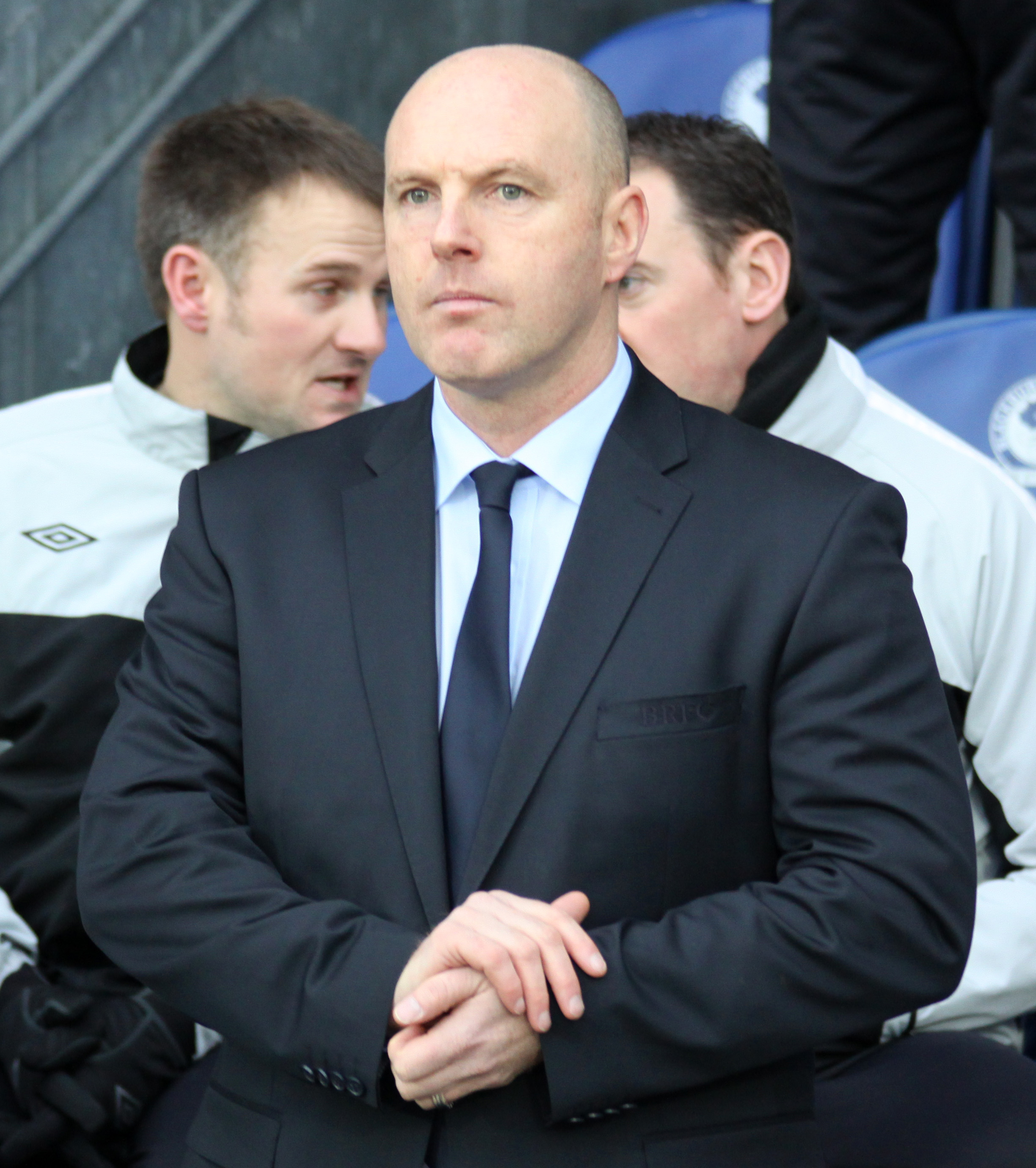
- Kean in 2010

Personal information
- Full name: Stephen Kean
- Date of birth: 30 September 1967 (age 59)
- Place of birth: Glasgow, Scotland
- Position: Winger

Team information
- Current team: Radomiak Radom (technical director)

Senior career*
Years	Team	Apps	(Gls)
1985–1987	Celtic	0	(0)
1987	→ Swansea City (loan)	4	(0)
1987–1988	Alloa Athletic	1	(0)
1988–1991	Académica Coimbra	9	(1)
1991	Naval	35	(0)
1991–1992	Bath City		
1993–1994	Newbury Town		

Managerial career
- 2010–2012: Blackburn Rovers
- 2013–2017: DPMM FC
- 2014: Brunei
- 2021: Melbourne Victory
- 2023–2024: Torpedo Kutaisi
- * Club domestic league appearances and goals

Stephen Kean (born 30 September 1967) is a Scottish football coach, executive and former player who is currently the technical director of Ekstraklasa club Radomiak Radom. Kean played as a winger for clubs in the lower divisions of Scottish, English and Portuguese leagues in the 1980s and 1990s, before moving into coaching. After a 21-month spell in charge of Blackburn Rovers, he resigned on 28 September 2012.

== Playing career ==
Kean grew up in Cumbernauld, a new town on the outskirts of Glasgow, attending St. Maurice's High School. Upon leaving school, he joined Celtic as a professional, but was unable to break into a first team then dominated by Celtic legends Tommy Burns, Murdo MacLeod and Paul McStay.

He joined Swansea City on loan in 1987, at the same time as Chris Coleman. They formed a lasting professional relationship, which carried on after both of their playing days had ended.

Kean then played for Académica Coimbra in Portugal, making nine appearances, and scoring one goal in all competitions. During his time in Portugal, Kean also played for Naval.

== Coaching and management career ==
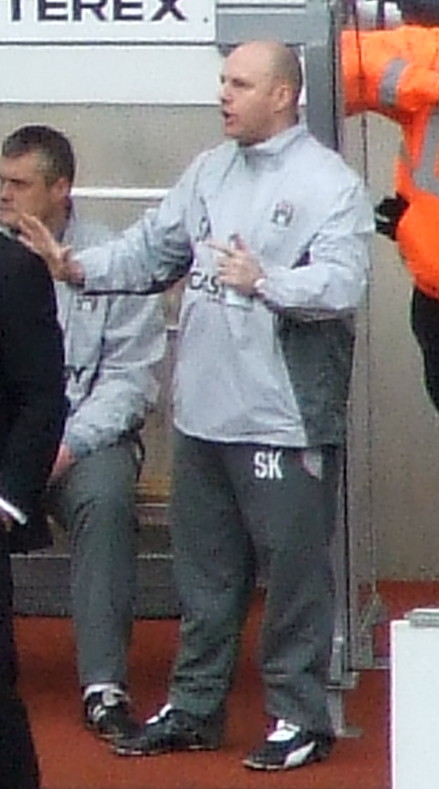
Kean with Coventry City in 2008

=== Coaching career ===
Since retiring from playing Kean has worked as a coach for Reading, Fulham, Real Sociedad and Coventry City, working as an assistant to Chris Coleman at Fulham, Real Sociedad and Coventry.

In June 2008, it was reported that Kean was in talks with Chelsea to become assistant manager to Luiz Felipe Scolari. Kean's fluency in Portuguese from his playing days was believed to be a key reason for Chelsea's interest.

Kean is an advocate for taking younger players “out of their comfort zone” in the early stages of their career.

In 2022, Hibs fielded a youthful B team made up mostly of under-20 players against a seasoned Brechin City side from the Highland League, whose greater experience and physicality ultimately told in a 4–1 penalty shoot-out win after a 1–1 draw.

“A lot of young players who will learn from playing against men in a proper, competitive game,” he told the Edinburgh Evening News.

=== Blackburn Rovers ===
On 4 August 2009, Blackburn Rovers manager Sam Allardyce appointed Kean as his new first team coach. Kean replaced Karl Robinson who returned to Milton Keynes Dons. Allardyce commented that he had received numerous applications for the first team coaching position and Kean "stood out above the rest through his personality, experience and knowledge of football at the highest level".

After the sacking of Allardyce on 13 December 2010 by new Blackburn owners Venky's, Kean was initially installed as caretaker manager but on 22 December 2010, he was appointed manager on a contract until the end of the season to prove his abilities in that position. On 4 January 2011, it was revealed by Anuradha Desai, chairperson of Venky's, that Kean would be offered a new two-to-three-year long-term contract to manage the club and on 20 January 2011, it was confirmed by Blackburn that Kean had signed a contract until June 2013. Kean's appointment was shrouded in a great deal of controversy since his agent Jerome Anderson had earlier played a major role in advising Venky's during the takeover of the club in the preceding months. Furthermore, Allardyce later received "substantial", but undisclosed, damages from Kean after Kean had been recorded in a bar in Hong Kong falsely alleging that Allardyce had been sacked from his post at Blackburn Rovers because he was a crook.

Kean started brightly as manager, but ten games without a win saw Rovers dragged into relegation trouble. A 15th-place finish was secured with a 3–2 win over Wolverhampton Wanderers on the final day of the 2010–11 Premier League season.

In November 2011, Blackburn confirmed that Kean had signed a new contract with improved terms, despite the club being in the bottom place of the league. This came despite Kean's comments less than a week earlier stating: "Yes, there have been discussions about a new contract, but I have told the owners that this is an inappropriate time to conclude any new contract discussions". The new deal came after months of protests at the club in which fans campaigned to have Kean removed as Rovers manager as he had recorded just one league win all season. At the time, Steve Kean was Blackburn Rovers' second worst manager since 1992, with only Paul Ince scoring a lower win percentage.

Further controversy was created when Kean admitted 'forfeiting' a League Cup quarter-final at Cardiff City for the sake of their league form, with fans subsequently demanding a refund for the ticket price, travel expenses and money lost due to not working on the day. In December 2011, the local newspaper and MP Jack Straw joined the fans in calling for Kean's resignation ahead of a crucial home match with Bolton Wanderers. Another defeat concluded Kean's first 38 league games as Blackburn manager in which he had amassed just 32 points and left Rovers bottom of the table at Christmas. Despite all of this, Kean remained defiant by insisting that he would stay in his job long enough to fashion a revival and that he would be "100% shocked" if he was sacked.

Results were somewhat improved in the second half of the season but five successive defeats in April dragged Rovers deep into relegation trouble again with Kean having recorded just 12 wins from his 55 league games since he took over. On 7 May 2012, a home loss against Wigan Athletic relegated Blackburn Rovers to the Football League Championship and ended an eleven-year run in the top flight.

Kean left his position as Rovers' manager on 28 September 2012 with the club third in the Championship table. He declared that he had been "forced to resign" and that his position had been "untenable".

=== DPMM FC ===
In October 2013 Kean agreed a deal to become the new manager of S.League side DPMM FC. Kean signed an initial one-year contract with the club in Brunei on 28 November 2013. Brunei led the 2014 S.League for the majority of the campaign but ended up finishing as runners up to Warriors FC following a 2–1 defeat to Tampines Rovers on the final day of the season. They were also knocked out of the 2014 Singapore Cup in the semi-final by Home United. The team did lift some silverware however, as they won the 2014 Singapore League Cup, beating Tanjong Pagar United 2–0 in the final.

Kean was also appointed as the head coach of Brunei national football team for the 2014 AFF Suzuki Cup qualification tournament in Laos in October 2014.

Brunei DPMM clinched the S-League championship on 21 November 2015, with a 4–0 win at home to Balestier Khalsa. Kean was named as the S.League's coach of the year in 2015.

In early November it was announced that Kean would leave Brunei DPMM at the end of the 2017 S.League season, a year before his contract with the club ended.

=== Melbourne Victory ===
On 23 October 2020 Kean was announced as the assistant coach for Melbourne Victory, serving under head coach Grant Brebner. Brebner and Kean had previously worked together during their time with Reading, with Kean serving as Academy Director and then First Team Coach, while Brebner was a player. In April 2021, Kean was appointed as interim coach until the end of the 2020–21 A-League season, following the sacking of Grant Brebner.

=== Hibernian ===
Kean became academy director of Scottish club Hibernian in November 2021, and was given the task of identifying youth players who could be promoted into the first team squad. He was linked with managerial vacancies at Dundee and Charlton Athletic during the 2022 close season, but stayed with Hibs into the 2022–23 season. For that season he decided that Hibs should not enter a "B" team in the Lowland League, as done by Celtic, Rangers and Hearts, and would instead enter the SPFL Reserve League, play friendlies against English clubs and participate in the 2022–23 UEFA Youth League. In the latter competition, Hibs progressed through the first two rounds by defeating Norwegian side Molde FK and French club Nantes before losing 2–1 to Borussia Dortmund in the knockout phase.

=== Torpedo Kutaisi ===
Kean left Hibernian in May 2023 to become manager of Georgian club Torpedo Kutaisi.

On 26 December 2023, Kean signed a new two-year contract with Torpedo Kutaisi, becoming General Manager of the club alongside retaining the position of Head Coach.

As manager of Torpedo Kutaisi, Kean steered the side to a top-three league finish for two consecutive seasons - the first time this has been achieved in six years. The team was then able to compete in the UEFA competition, reaching stage two in the second round qualifying stage for the first time in 22 years and earning Torpedo Kutaisi team 1.4 million euros in bonus money.

Kean also led the team to victory in the Georgia Super Cup, which was only the third time the club had won the title in its history.

During his time as manager, the club achieved its highest-ever player sales, earning 850,000 euros from selling Saba Goglichidze for 450, 000 euros and Giorgi Arabidze for 400,000 euros. Kean also built sports science and data analysis departments as well as making improvements to the training base.

On 24 January 2025, Kean was appointed as sporting director of Torpedo Kutaisi.

== Personal life ==
Kean is married with two children.

He is a champion of mental health in football and has been outspoken about the impact that criticism from fans and the media can have on players, managers and other professionals.

Kean told Sky Sports that the “pressure cooker” atmosphere of Premier League football has a profound impact on the people who work in the game.

He also warned the channel about the effects that fame has on the children of leading figures in the football world, revealing that his children suffered “nasty” cyberbullying due to his role at Blackburn.

Speaking to The Scotsman, Kean said he was at his "happiest" when working to develop players, telling the newspaper: “I just love being on a training pitch."

He is also an advocate of encouraging younger players to train with the first team, which makes their game "sharper" and gives them "that little bit more bite".

On 15 August 2011, Kean was convicted of drunk driving at Macclesfield Magistrates' Court. The Court rejected his defence that his drinks had been spiked following a match against Manchester United. He was banned from driving for 18 months and fined £1,800.

== Managerial statistics ==
As of 24 November 2023

Managerial record by team and tenure
Team	From	To	Record				
Team	From	To	P	W	D	L	Win %
Blackburn Rovers	13 December 2010	28 September 2012	74	21	16	37	28.4
DPMM FC	7 November 2013	4 November 2017	135	67	22	46	49.6
Brunei	12 October 2014	20 October 2014	4	0	0	4	0.0
Melbourne Victory	19 April 2021	30 June 2021	10	2	2	6	20.0
Torpedo Kutaisi	19 May 2023	21 December 2024	67	35	15	17	52.2
Total			247	102	46	99	41.3

== Honours ==
=== Manager ===
Torpedo Kutasi

- Georgian Super Cup: 2024

DPMM

- S.League: 2015
- Singapore League Cup: 2014

Individual

- S.League Coach of the Year: 2015
