= Vikram Akula =

Indian-American entrepreneur and banker

Vikram
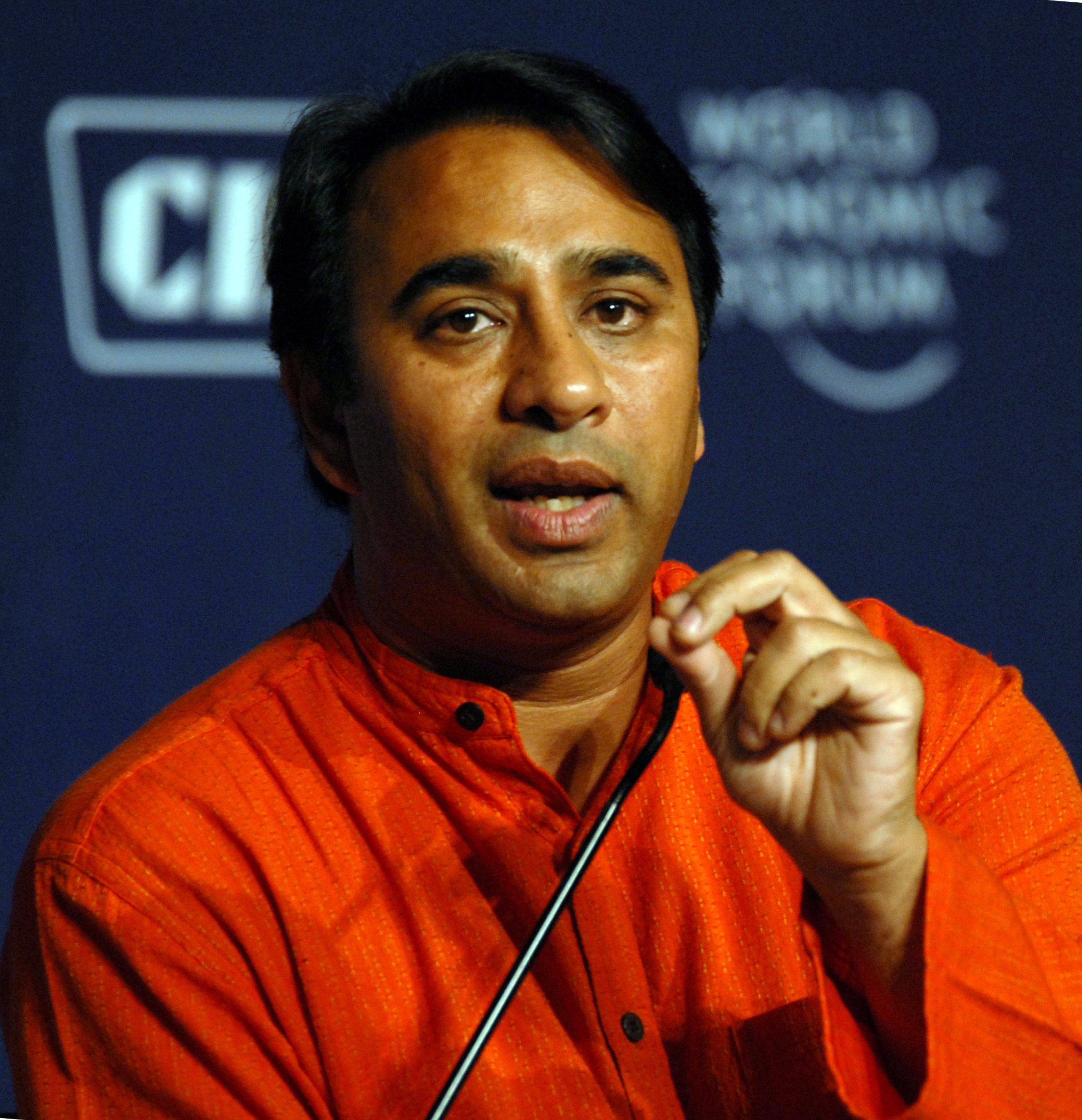
- Born: 7 November 1968 (age 57); Ryakal Village, Medak district, Telangana, India
- Education: Tufts University; Yale University; University of Chicago
- Occupations: Founder, SKS Microfinance
- Parent(s): Akula V. Krishna; Padma Krishna

Vikram Akula (born 7 November 1968) is an American banker and the founder of SKS Microfinance (now BFIL), a micro finance company and former chairperson of Bharat Financial Inclusion Ltd. SKS was an organization that offered microloans and insurance to poor women in India. He stepped down as SKS Chairperson in November 2011 and became Chairperson Emeritus.

Akula is also a founding investor and a Director in AgSri, a sustainable agriculture company focused on helping small sugarcane farmers reduce water use, and a Director in Bodhi Educational Society, which establishes schools for underprivileged children in India. In 2006, he was named by TIME magazine as one of the 100 most influential people in the world for his work in financial inclusion.

Akula currently serves as Chairperson of VAYA Finserv Private Limited. Founded in 2014, the India-based company markets financial services to low-income groups on behalf of partner banks.

== Early life and education ==
Akula's father, Akula V. Krishna, was a surgeon who settled in Schenectady, New York, where Akula went to school. Akula graduated from Niskayuna High School in 1986 and enrolled at Tufts University, where he graduated as a double major in philosophy and English with honors in 1990. He went to Yale University for a M.A. in International Relations, and was awarded a Fulbright scholarship for an action-research microfinance project in India in 1994–95. He completed his Ph.D. in Political Science from the University of Chicago in 2004. In 2019-20, he was a Distinguished Career Fellow at Stanford University.

== Career ==
Upon graduating from Tufts, Akula returned to India for a short while in 1990 and worked with the Deccan Development Society, a small grassroots rural non-profit organization. He then returned to USA and worked for the Worldwatch Institute in Washington D.C. as a researcher, where he wrote articles about poverty and sustainable development. During his Fulbright, Akula returned to the Deccan Development Society, where he helped manage the organization's microfinance program. Akula saw the limitation of non-profit microfinance and proposed a more market-based approach. He outlines his philosophy in his book, A Fistful of Rice; My Unexpected Quest to End Poverty Through Profitability, published by Harvard Business Press in 2010.

=== SKS Microfinance ===
In 1996, Akula completed his Fulbright and went to the University of Chicago to pursue his Ph.D, which he completed in 2004. As a Ph.D. student, he created a business plan for a for-profit microfinance company and in December 1997, Akula returned to India to set up Swayam Krishi Sangam (SKS) as a vehicle to implement the plan. Initially set up as a non-profit, SKS converted to the for-profit SKS Microfinance in 2005. SKS Microfinance secured a round of equity investment of $11.5 million in March 2007, led by Sequoia Capital. In November 2008, SKS raised an equity investment of $75 million, the largest equity investment raised by an MFI to that date. SKS raised additional equity from Infosys founder Narayan Murthy and Bajaj Allianz, which represented the first-ever microfinance investment by an insurance company.

In mid-August 2010, SKS Microfinance had an initial public offering (IPO) on the Bombay Stock Exchange, which raised $350 million and was oversubscribed 14 times and which included anchor investors such as George Soros. According to the company's website, SKS Microfinance has disbursed more than $15 billion in micro-loans.

Akula resigned from the role of Executive Chairperson on 23 November 2011 and he relinquished his role as a promoter of SKS on 3 May 2014.

=== Influences ===
When founding SKS, Akula drew inspiration from the work of Muhammad Yunus, the Nobel Prize winner and founder of the Grameen Bank in Bangladesh, one of the world's first microfinance organizations. In a face-to-face debate with Yunus at the 2010 Clinton Global Initiative, Akula insisted that going public is the only way for an MFI to raise sufficient funds to provide micro-loans for billions of poor people in need worldwide.

== Controversy ==
In late 2010, the state government of Andhra Pradesh accused microfinance companies, including the then market leader SKS, for the suicides of poor, debt-ridden residents of the state that year. Two investigations into the incident, the first an independent investigation commissioned by SKS, and the second commissioned by an industry umbrella group, both pointed to SKS involvement in the suicides, and said that SKS employees had engaged in illegal practices like verbal and physical harassment, coercion, and public humiliation, in order to recover debts.

In an investigative article, Erika Kinetz of the Associated Press, wrote,"a profound shift in values and incentives at SKS began in 2008" when Akula left the CEO role. "Boston-based Sandstone Capital, now SKS' largest investor, made a major investment. It joined U.S. private equity firm Sequoia Capital, which funded Google and Apple and is SKS' largest shareholder, on the board of directors. Akula, who had been chief executive in the company's early days, stepped down in December 2008 but stayed on as chairman. The company brought in new top executives from the worlds of finance and insurance. SKS also began transferring more loans off its books, selling highly rated pools of loans to banks, which then assumed most of the associated risk of borrower default. That freed SKS to push out more and bigger loans. In December 2009, SKS launched a massive sales drive. The "Incentives Galore" program ran through February 2010 — just one month before the company filed its IPO prospectus." She noted that Akula tried to stop this. "In spring 2011, Akula began circulating a plan to spend $10 million to train financial counselors who would make sure clients weren't getting into too much debt and used their loans productively, according to people with firsthand knowledge of the proposal. The plan was never adopted."

Akula addresses the controversy in his book, Micro-Meltdown: The Inside Story of the Rise, Fall, and Resurgence of the World's Most Valuable Microlender.

== Awards and recognition ==
Akula has received several awards for his work with SKS.

- Time magazine's 100 Most Influential People of the Year in 2006.
- Social Entrepreneur of the Year in India, 2006.
- Ernst & Young Entrepreneur of the Year in India (Start-up, 2006)
- Ernst & Young Entrepreneur of the Year in India (Business Transformation, 2010)
- India Today, India's 50 Most Powerful People, 2009.
- Forbes India, Person of the Year nominee, 2009.
- Godfrey Phillips National Bravery Award, 2010.
- World Economic Forum’s Young Global Leader award, 2008.
- Echoing Green Poverty Alleviation Economic Development - 1998 Fellow
- Karmaveer Puraskaar Noble Laureates, 2006–2007.
