= Venky's =

Indian integrated poultry and processed-food company

Venky’s
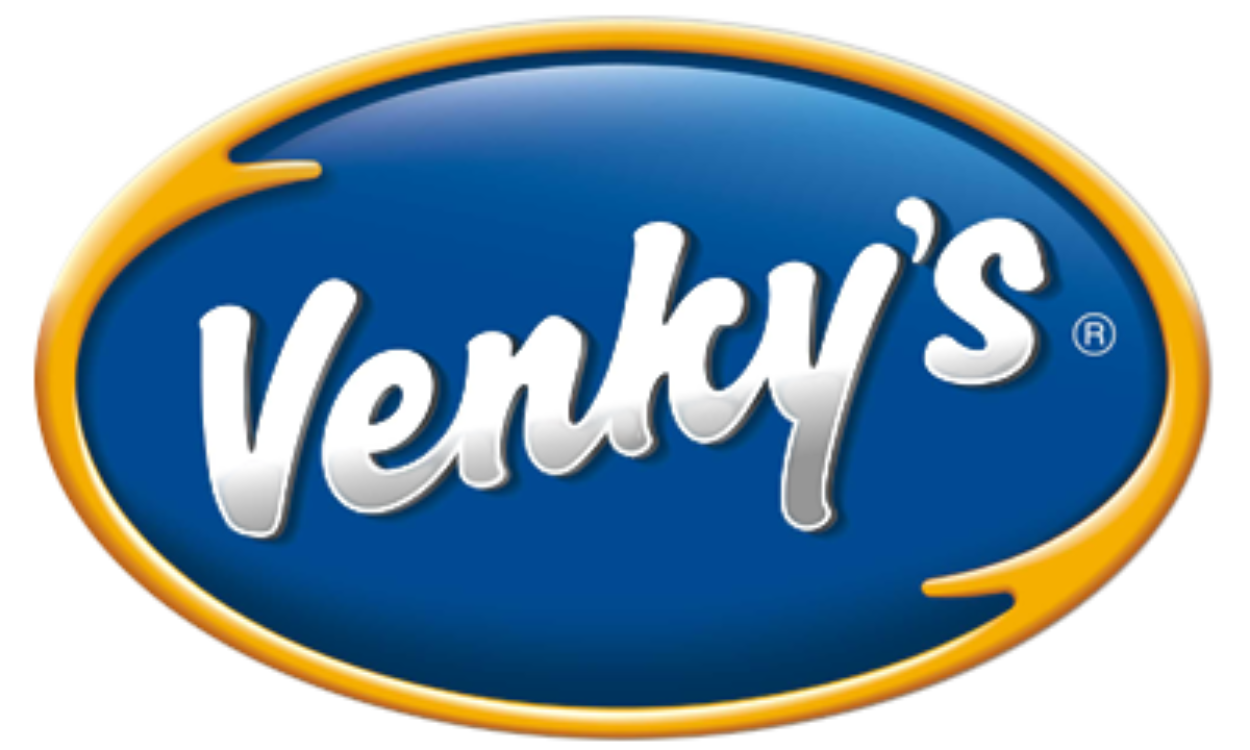
- Trade name: Venky's
- Native name: Venky's (India) Limited
- Formerly: Western Hatcheries Limited
- Company type: Public
- Traded as: BSE: 523261 NSE: VENKEYS
- ISIN: INE398A01010
- Industry: Poultry farming, food processing
- Founded: July 1, 1976 (49 years ago)
- Founder: V H Group
- Headquarters: Pune, Maharashtra, India
- Area served: India and international markets
- Key people: Anuradha J. Desai (Chairperson); B. Venkatesh Rao (Vice Chairman); B. Balaji (Managing Director)
- Products: Day-old chicks, specific-pathogen-free (SPF) eggs, processed chicken, animal health products, edible / solvent-extracted oil
- Revenue: ▼₹33.06 billion (2024)
- Operating income: ▲₹1.34 billion (2024)
- Net income: ▲₹1.16 billion (2024)
- Total assets: ▼₹20.70 billion (2024)
- Total equity: ▲₹14.75 billion (2024)
- Number of employees: 5,138 (2024)
- Website: venkys.com

Venky’s (India) Limited (often styled Venky’s) is an Indian publicly listed poultry company based in Pune, Maharashtra. It is part of the Venkateshwara Hatcheries (VH) Group. Its business activities include breeding, hatcheries, feed, specific-pathogen-free (SPF) eggs, processed chicken, animal health products, and oilseed processing. The company traces its incorporation to 1976, and was formerly known as Western Hatcheries Limited.

== History ==
Venky’s India Limited was incorporated in 1976 and later adopted its current name after operating as Western Hatcheries Limited; the change of name took effect in June 2000.

Venky’s is part of the wider V H Group, founded in 1971 by Banda Vasudev Rao.

== Operations ==
Venky’s operates through three principal segments: Poultry and Poultry Products, Animal Health Products, and Oilseed. Offerings include day-old broiler and layer chicks, specific-pathogen-free (SPF) eggs, processed chicken products, poultry feeds and supplements, as well as soy extraction and refined edible oil.

=== Retail and foodservice ===
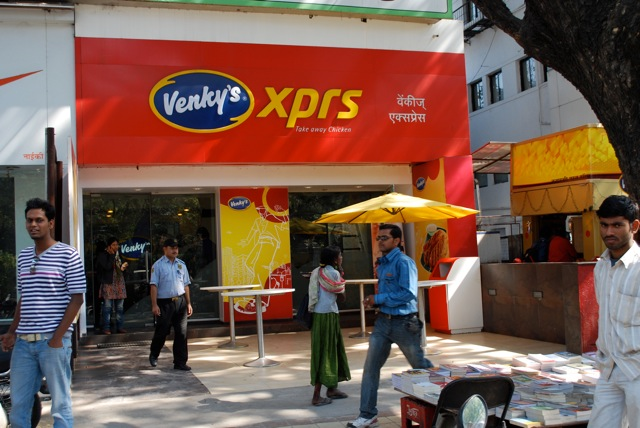
A Venky’s Xprss quick-service outlet in India

Under the Venky’s brand, the group has developed a small chain of quick-service outlets (often styled Venky’s Xprs/XPRSS) focused on processed chicken. A 2024 credit report noted “around 14 express outlets” operated under Venky’s at the time.

== Corporate affairs ==
Venky’s is headquartered at Venkateshwara House on Sinhagad Road, Pune, Maharashtra.

As of 2024, Venkateshwara Hatcheries Pvt. Ltd. (VHPL) of the VH Group held a controlling stake of about 51.02% in Venky’s (India) Limited.

== Relationship to VH Group and sports ==
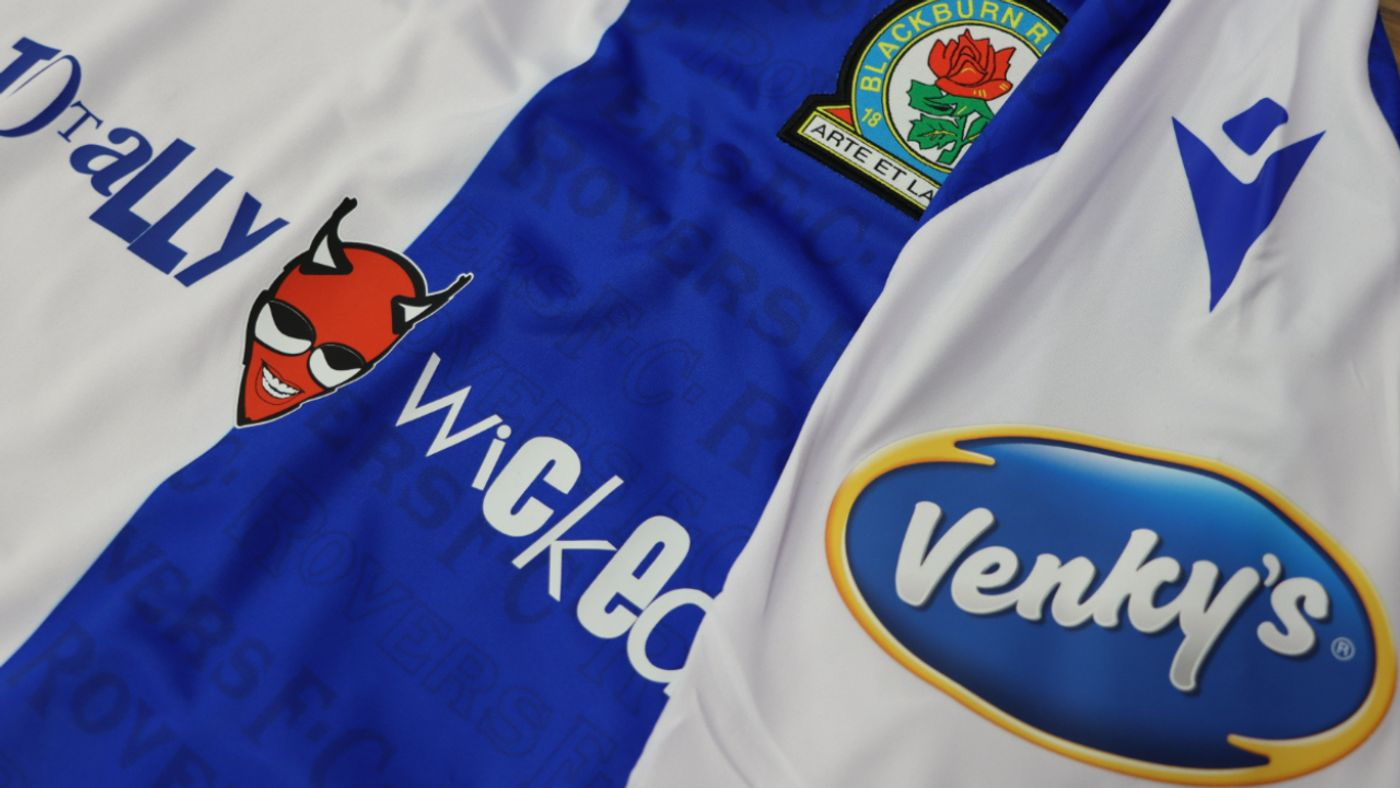
Blackburn Rovers F.C. shirt displaying Venky’s branding

In November 2010, the V H Group purchased English football club Blackburn Rovers F.C., the first Indian ownership of a Premier League club. Reports at the time valued the transaction at approximately £23–54 million including debt assumption.

In July 2023, Blackburn Rovers F.C. announced a five-year sponsorship agreement with the VH Group that placed the Venky’s brand on the men’s and women’s playing kits, as well as other club assets.

== See also ==
- V H Group
- Poultry farming in India
