= V H Group =

Indian poultry industry conglomerate

Venkateshwara Hatcheries Group
- Type: Private Limited
- Founded: 1971
- Headquarters: Pune, Maharashtra, India

The V H Group is an Indian conglomerate primarily comprising companies related to the poultry industry, including processed food, animal vaccines, human and animal pharmaceutical and healthcare products. They are also the owners of Blackburn Rovers F.C.

It was founded as Venkateshwara Hatcheries Pvt Ltd in 1971 in Hyderabad, India and later shifted its base to Pune, India to seek favourable climatic conditions required for research of livestock. It has also built Balaji temple at Pune which is a replica of famous Balaji temple of Tirupati. It is also the owner of English football club Blackburn Rovers, overseeing two relegations and one promotion with the club.

== Group profile ==
The V H Group is controlled by the family of Dr. B. V. Rao. His daughter, Anuradha Desai, is serving as group chairperson since his death in 1996. His sons B Balaji Rao and Venkatesh Rao sit on the board of the group's companies.

The V H Group has its headquarters in Pune, and has offices in the United Kingdom, Oman, Bangladesh, Vietnam, Italy. The group has production plants in India, Vietnam, Bangladesh, the United States and Switzerland.

In December 2010, the group launched Venky's Xprs, a fast food restaurant specialising in chicken. The first outlet opened in Pune, India.

== Sport ==
=== Blackburn Rovers ===
In November 2010, the group took over English Premier League club Blackburn Rovers F.C., acquiring a 99.9% stake through a new holding company, Venky's London Ltd. The deal was worth £43 million including taking on around £20 million of the club's debt.

After sacking Sam Allardyce as the club's manager, Steve Kean was appointed in his place, raising media concern as Kean's agent Jerome Anderson had advised Venky's during its takeover of the club. Venky's oversaw an unsuccessful period resulting in relegation to the Championship after the 2011–12 Premier League season ending the club's 11-year run in the top flight, then a further relegation to the third-tier EFL League One after the 2016–17 season. Despite Kean leaving Blackburn Rovers in September 2012, criticism of Venky's running of the club has continued, with both fans and the media calling them into question. In September 2016, Venky's publicly stated their commitment to the club.

== Businesses ==
The group includes:

- Venkateshwara Hatcheries Pvt. Ltd.
- Venky's (India) Limited
- VENCO Research and Breeding Farms Pvt. Ltd.
- Venkateshwara Research and Breeding Farms Pvt. Ltd.
- Venkateshwara B.V.Bio-Corp Pvt. Ltd.
- Uttara Foods & Feeds Pvt. Ltd.
- Uttara Impex Pvt. Ltd.
- Venky's Vietnam Ltd.
- Venky's Singapore Pvt. Ltd.
- VH Group Bangladesh
- Bala Industries & Entertainment Pvt. Ltd.
