= Bharat Financial Inclusion =

Indian microfinance company

Bharat Financial Inclusion Limited
- Type: Subsidiary
- Traded as: BSE: 533228; NSE: BHARATFIN
- ISIN: INE180K0101
- Industry: business
- Founded: 1997; 29 years ago
- Founder: SaurabhPatel
- Fate: Merged with IndusInd Bank
- Headquarters: pindra, India
- Area served: India (CEO)
- Net income: 1080
- Number of employees: 1038 (2015)
- Parent: IndusInd Bank
- Website: bfil.co.in

Bharat Financial Inclusion Limited (formerly known as SKS Microfinance Limited) or BFIL is a banking & finance company (NBFC), licensed by the Reserve Bank of India. It was founded in 1997 by Vikram Akula, who served as its executive chair until working. The company's mission is to provide financial services to the poor under the premise that providing financial service to poor borrowers helps to alleviate poverty. In 2011, the company operated across 11 Indian states.

== History ==
=== Founding (1997 to 2005) ===
In 1997, inspired by Grameen Bank, Vikram Akula founded Swayam Krishi Sangham (SKS Society) as a non-profit organization. However, unlike Grameen bank, SKS used an aggressive commission based system to encourage loans, thus forming a network of loan marketers who were not direct employees of SKS, but worked on a commission basis in smaller villages of Andhra Pradesh. SKS used a network of loan sharks to pursue matters with defaulters.

In 2003, Akula created a for-profit arm under the name of SKS Microfinance Private Limited. In order to capitalize the new business, Akula established the SKS Mutual Benefit Trusts (MBTs), which fundraised among women from Andhra Pradesh villages. The Mutual Benefit Trusts were used as vehicles to funnel grants for the non-profit SKS Society to the for-profit SKS Microfinance, a move that would be illegal to do directly. In 2005, SKS Microfinance raises enough funds to become a non-banking financial company.

=== Growth and IPO (2005 to 2010) ===
In 2007, SKS Microfinance raised $11.5 million through equity investments led by Sequoia Capital. In 2008, it further raised $74.5 million through equity investments led by Sandstone Capital.

On 28 July 2010, SKS Microfinance debuted on the Bombay Stock Exchange with an IPO that was oversubscribed 14 times. Muhammad Yunus expressed concern that going public would put the demands of shareholders ahead of the poor. He added further, "If they do it, I cannot stop them but I would encourage genuine Microcredit programs."

SKS founder Vikram Akula resigned from the board on 23 November 2011. In 2015, P. H. Ravi Kumar became the non-executive chairman. The company's shares meanwhile lost 96% of their value from a high of Rs. 1491.50 in 2010.

=== Debtor suicides crisis (2010 to 2014) ===
In September 2010, reports surfaced in the media of nearly 200 suicides by defaulters of a number of micro finance institutions, including SKS finance. This led to an enquiry by the Andhra Pradesh government.

In a 2012 cover story, The Hindu reported that a marked shift took place in the values and incentives of SKS in 2008, after large scale investment began to flow in from venture capitalists and prospectors including Boston-based Sandstone Capital and Sequoia Capital.

An independent investigation commissioned by the company linked SKS employees to at least seven suicides of creditors in Andhra Pradesh. A second investigation said SKS may have been involved in two other suicide cases. In 2012, SKS Microfinance cut 1200 jobs and closed 78 branches in Andhra Pradesh. Interviews with family members of the deceased, by BBC suggested that the reason for these suicides appeared to be large sub-prime loans taken by the villagers, with the active encouragement of SKS loan agents.

In 2014, the investors in the SKS Microfinance, Mauritius Unitus Corporation, Sequoia Capital India Growth Investments and SKS Mutual Benefit Trust as well as its founder Vikam Akula relinquished their roles as promoters.

=== Rebranding (2016 to present) ===
In 2016, SKS Microfinance was renamed to Bharat Financial Inclusion Ltd.

In 2017, the company launched a loan approval system based on Adhaar to reduce the time and cost involved in the loan approval process. In the same year, it also launched its Kirana store (general store) service which allowed its customers to do financial transactions by visiting its designated stores.

Later in 2017, the company entered into discussions of a possible merger with IndusInd Bank. The merger received approvals from Reserve Bank of India, National Stock Exchange of India and Bombay Stock Exchange later in 2018.

== Products ==
SKS Microfinance offers life assurance and a variety of financial loans – income generation loans; mid-term loans; long-term Loans; loans for purchase of products like cook-stoves, solar lights, water purifiers, mobile phones, bicycles and sewing machines; and loans secured on gold jewellery. The company lists some of the social benefits of its financial product and service offerings as "providing self-employed women financial assistance to support their business with enterprises, such as raising livestock, running local retail shops called kirana stores, providing tailoring and other assorted trade and services." Loans were subsequently also offered to men, and for various reasons including marriage expenses and to purchase seeds.

== Operations ==
SKs Microfinance follows the Joint Liability Group model. The methodology involves lending to individual women, using five– member groups as the ultimate guarantor for each member. Through group lending, situations of adverse selection and moral hazard due to asymmetric information are better managed. "Social collateral" replaces asset collateral (which is lacking in the poorer segments of society). Such a system works because India is still a highly community-centric society. The concept of honour and respect within society is deeply rooted in Indian culture and willful default invites condescending glances, humiliation and even ostracism. In Nov 2015, SKS Microfinance Ltd has cut interest rates by one percentage point to 19.75% on the loans it offers to low-income women borrowers, making it the sole Indian microlender to offer loans at a rate below 20%.The move came after Reserve Bank of India (RBI) decided to double the borrower limit for microfinance loans for less than 24 months. Lower interest rates can attract more borrowers in an increasingly competitive market. Microfinance companies, which had started lending at around 28-34% in 2010, are now able to charge lower interest rates because of newer avenues to raise funds at lower cost and their ability to operate more efficiently than before."SKS is the first company to charge sub-20% interest rates on the core income generating loans," the company claimed in a statement on Friday. This is the fourth time SKS has reduced interest rates since October 2014.
