= Jerome Anderson (football agent) =

English football agent

Jerome Anderson was a London-based sports agent with Sport Entertainment and Media Group from 2001 until his retirement. Initially focused on the football world, he extended his reach into heavyweight boxing and was Lennox Lewis' agent for his bout against Mike Tyson that was described by The Telegraph as one of “the moments of the decade.”

Anderson had a number of football clients prior to his work with SEM and was the first agent to introduce foreign stars to the English Premier League, including Dennis Bergkamp, Marc Overmars and Uwe Rosler. He represented nine of Arsenal’s 1989 title-winning side and has represented over 200 professional footballers. Anderson has now retired from his position at SEM to focus on his other business interests. He was at the forefront of the establishment of the charity The David Rocastle Trust, which helps to benefit families and communities.

In February 2009, SEM formed a corporate partnership with Kentaro, a Swiss-based sports rights business who are among the major players in the international marketing of football television rights.

== Early career and involvement at Arsenal ==
Anderson trained as a banker and worked as a currency trader and in insurance, before beginning his career as Jerome Anderson Management in association with players from Arsenal F.C., whom he had supported since he was four and where he had been the stadium announcer. Among his early clients were the Arsenal players Charlie Nicholas and David Rocastle. "It became clear that players needed proper professional representation to ensure they were focused on success on the field," Anderson said.

SEM went on to represent, among others, the Arsenal players Tony Adams, Ian Wright, Dennis Bergkamp, David Seaman, Emmanuel Petit, and Thierry Henry. Anderson formed a close working relationship with the Arsenal vice-chairman, David Dein, whose son, Darren, worked for SEM.

== Mikel John Obi ==
In 2005 Anderson's SEM was involved in the controversial transfer of Mikel John Obi from FK Lyn in the Norwegian league to Chelsea F.C. through their agent, John Shittu. Shittu reportedly persuaded Mikel's father to grant SEM power of attorney over his son and subsequently oversaw the player's transfer to the London club despite a move having seemingly been agreed to take the player to Manchester United.

== Manchester City ==
Anderson subsequently came to further attention for his influence at Manchester City F.C. Between £5 million and £7 million was reported to have been paid in commission to Anderson as part of the recruitment of eight new players in the weeks following the takeover of the club by Thaksin Shinawatra in May 2007. Anderson advised Shinawatra on the takeover, introducing him to Keith Harris (whose firm, Seymour Pierce, handled the deal) and recommending as manager Sven-Göran Eriksson, before his influence waned as the new owners balked at such payments and other figures –notable Kia Joorabchian and Pini Zahavi– became involved.

Thaksin Shinawatra was regarded by a number of human rights groups as being an "unfit person" to own a Premier League football club. He was eventually deposed as Chairman by the Manchester City Board and forced to sell 90% of his interest in the Club for £210m. Manchester City's trading losses trebled during the full year in which Shinawatra was in control. The introduction of new capital by Sheikh Mansour bin Zayed Al Nahyan's Abu Dhabi United Group Investment & Development Ltd saved the club after Shinawatra's assets were frozen as part of the international investigation into corruption carried out by the Thai authorities.

== Blackburn Rovers ==
After being a major advisor to Venky's during their successful takeover of Blackburn Rovers in November 2010, Anderson continued to exert considerable influence on the club. After the Blackburn manager Sam Allardyce was sacked in December 2010, Blackburn were forced to deny that the dispute had been based on the club's transfer policy being set by the Kentaro sports agency, with whom Anderson's SEM were in partnership. "Kentaro are our main consultants but Sam had the final call," Venky's chairwoman Anuradha Desai said.

The new manager at Blackburn was Steve Kean, who had been first-team coach under Allardyce. Kean was represented by Anderson. When John Williams left Blackburn Rovers in February 2011 after 14 years as chairman, Anuradha Desai explained that the departure was in part due to the fact that he had "struggled to accept Jerome's role at the club".
