= B. V. Rao =

Indian entrepreneur and agriculturalist (1935–1996)

Banda Vasudev Rao
- Born: 6 November 1935; Chanchalguda, Hyderabad, Telangana, India
- Died: 26 January 1996 (aged 60)
- Years active: 1970–1996
- Spouse(s): Uttara Devi, Roopa Rao
- Awards: Padma Shri; WPSA International Hall of Fame

Banda Vasudev Rao Yadav (1935–1996) was an Indian entrepreneur and agriculturalist, considered by many as the father of the poultry industry in India. He founded the V H Group, an Indian poultry industry conglomerate, in 1971. He was also the founder chairman of the National Egg Coordination Committee (NECC) and was a 2004 inductee of the International Poultry Hall of Fame of the World Poultry Science Association. The Government of India awarded him the fourth highest civilian award, the Padma Shri, in 1990. His company directly employed around 5000 employees by 1996. When he died, the combined fortune of his family was $325 million (₹1300 crore).

== Early and personal life ==
B. V. Rao was born into a Yadav (Modati golla ) family on 6 November 1935 at Chanchalguda,Saidabad Upperguda 500023 in Hyderabad, in the Princely Indian state of Hyderabad (presently in Telangana).

== Career ==
After working in a range of different roles: as a telephone operator, railway police staff and as personal secretary to a state minister, Rao enrolled for a short-length course at Acharya N. G. Ranga Agricultural University, Rajendranagar. He successfully completed a training program in dairy and poultry farming where he had the opportunity to learn under an American teacher, Moore. His first business venture was with 500 birds entrusted to him by Moore for tending and soon Rao started his own venture on a 7-acre plot, for which funds were raised by selling his wife's jewelry. The business, started in 1970, grew over the years to the present V H Group, a US$2 billion conglomerate with interests in poultry, meat, pharmaceuticals, cattle feed, sports and with presence in India, Bangladesh, the United Kingdom, Singapore, Vietnam, and Brazil.

When the price of eggs went down in the early 1980s, Rao gathered farmers together and founded the National Egg Coordination Committee in 1982 and became the first chairman. He was also associated with the World Poultry Science Association (WPSA) and headed the India chapter from 1993 to 1996. He was one of the key figures in the organization of the World Poultry Conference in New Delhi in 1996. He also founded a higher education institution, Dr B.V. Rao Institute of Poultry Management and Technology. The Government of India awarded him the civilian honour of the Padma Shri in 1990. The World Poultry Science Association inducted him into their Hall of Fame in 2004.

== See also ==
- National Egg Coordination Committee
- V H Group
