= 2010–11 Aberdeen F.C. season =

Aberdeen
2010–11 season
- Chairman: Stewart Milne
- Manager: Mark McGhee (until 1 December 2010); Neil Cooper (from 2 to 11 December 2010); Craig Brown (from 13 December 2010)
- Stadium: Pittodrie Stadium
- Scottish Premier League: 9th
- Scottish Cup: Semi-finals
- League Cup: Semi-finals
- Top goalscorer: League: Scott Vernon (10); All: Scott Vernon (16)
- Highest home attendance: 15,307 vs. Rangers 26 September 2010
- Lowest home attendance: 5,636 vs. Dunfermline Athletic 6 February 2011
- Average home league attendance: 8,874
Home colours	Away colours

The 2010–11 season was Aberdeen's 98th season in the top flight of Scottish football. Aberdeen competed in the Scottish Premier League, Scottish Cup and Scottish League Cup.

Aberdeen began the season with successive league wins over Hamilton Academical and St Johnstone, but suffered a poor run of form in the following months, culminating in a club record 0–9 defeat to Celtic in November 2010. The following month, Mark McGhee was sacked as manager and replaced by Motherwell manager Craig Brown.

In the cups, Aberdeen reached the semi-final of the Scottish League Cup, losing 1–4 to Celtic in January 2011. Aberdeen also reached the semi-final of the Scottish Cup, losing 0–4 to Celtic in April 2011.

== Pre-season and friendlies ==
Aberdeen announced a series of pre-season friendlies in May 2010, including a tour of England and games in Scotland and Germany. The first pre-season friendly on 17 July 2010 against Highland Football League club Fraserburgh ended in a 1–3 defeat for Aberdeen. The following day, Aberdeen won 2–0 against Peterhead, with Mitchel Megginson and Michael Paton scoring. On 21 July, Aberdeen lost 0–1 to Dunfermline Athletic.

Aberdeen's tour of England began in Tamworth on 24 July. Despite Aberdeen taking an early lead, Tamworth equalised early in the second half, and the game ended 1–1. Aberdeen's next game was against Port Vale, Aberdeen won 1–0 thanks to a Michael Paton penalty ten minutes before the end of the game. The tour of England concluded with a 0–1 defeat to Brighton & Hove Albion on 31 July 2010.

Aberdeen returned to Scotland to face Brechin City in a memorial match for former Brechin City chairman David Will on 4 August 2010. The result was a 2–2 draw, Fraser Fyvie and Andrew Considine scored for Aberdeen. Aberdeen's final pre-season game was in Germany against 1. FC Kaiserslautern on 7 August 2010. Aberdeen lost 0–2 to the Bundesliga club.

17 July 2010	Fraserburgh	3–1	Aberdeen	Fraserburgh
15:00	Main 39'; Duguid 66'; Robertson 68' (o.g.)	Report	J. Smith 52'	Stadium: Bellslea Park; Attendance: 400

18 July 2010	Peterhead	0–2	Aberdeen	Peterhead
14:00		Report	Megginson 59'; Paton 86' (pen.)	Stadium: Balmoor; Attendance: 1,200

21 July 2010	Dunfermline Athletic	1–0	Aberdeen	Dunfermline
19:45	Clarke 53'	Report		Stadium: East End Park; Attendance: 1,037

24 July 2010	Tamworth	1–1	Aberdeen	Tamworth
15:00	Perry 53'	Report	Magennis 2'	Stadium: The Lamb Ground; Attendance: 734; Referee: S. Rushton

27 July 2010	Port Vale	0–1	Aberdeen	Burslem
19:30		Report	Paton 80' (pen.)	Stadium: Vale Park; Attendance: 1,824

31 July 2010	Brighton & Hove Albion	1–0	Aberdeen	Brighton
15:00	Bennett 38'	Report		Stadium: Withdean Stadium; Attendance: 2,821; Referee: Dave Phillips

3 August 2010	Brechin City	2–2	Aberdeen	Brechin
19:45	McKenna 47'; McAllister 71'	Report	Fyvie 16'; Considine 90'	Stadium: Glebe Park; Attendance: 1,791

7 August 2010	1. FC Kaiserslautern	2–0	Aberdeen	Kaiserslautern, Germany
15:30	Tiffert 33'; Hoffer 55'	Report		Stadium: Fritz Walter Stadion; Attendance: 3,403

26 April 2010 Steve Dixon Testimonial	Lossiemouth	0–3	Aberdeen	Lossiemouth
19:30			Magennis 49'; Masson 61'; Fleet 72'	Stadium: Grant Park; Referee: Scott MacDonald

== Transfers ==
Seven new players arrived at Pittodrie in the summer transfer window, including Scotland international Paul Hartley, who was appointed as team captain. Three players were signed on loan between September 2010 and the end of the January transfer window, in addition to three permanent signings. Full-back Ricky Foster joined Aberdeen's rivals Rangers F.C. on transfer deadline day in August on a season-long loan, with striker Andrius Velička moving in the opposite direction.

=== In ===
Date	Player	From	Fee	Contract length	Source
June 2010	(Northern Ireland) Rory McArdle	(England) Rochdale	Free	Two years	
5 July 2010	(Northern Ireland) Josh Magennis	(Wales) Cardiff City	Free	Two years	
13 July 2010	(England) Mark Howard	(Scotland) St Mirren	Free	One year	
26 July 2010	(England) Scott Vernon	(England) Colchester United	Free	Two years	
26 July 2010	(Togo) Yoann Folly	(England) Plymouth Argyle	Free	Two years	
28 July 2010	(Scotland) Paul Hartley	(England) Bristol City	Free	Two years	
31 August 2010	(Lithuania) Andrius Velička	(Scotland) Rangers	Loan	End of Season	
6 September 2010	(Montenegro) Nikola Vujadinović	(Italy) Udinese	Loan	End of Season	
24 December 2010	(Scotland) David McNamee	(England) Plymouth Argyle	Free	Six months	
31 December 2010	(England) Myles Anderson	(England) Leyton Orient	Free	Six months	
13 January 2011	(England) Robert Milsom	(England) Fulham	Free	Six months	
13 January 2011	(England) Nick Blackman	(England) Blackburn Rovers	Loan	Six months	
31 January 2011	(Scotland) Steven Smith	(England) Norwich City	Loan	Six months	

The end of the previous season saw three on-loan players return to their clubs. Paul Marshall, Jim Paterson and last season's top scorer Steven MacLean all left to go back to their parent club. Eight out-of-contract players departed Aberdeen on free transfers in the summer, including left-back Charlie Mulgrew, who rejoined Celtic, and former captain Mark Kerr, who joined Greek club Asteras Tripolis. Only one player left the club in the January transfer window, English defender Jerel Ifil, who was released from his contract.

=== Out ===
Date	Player	To	Fee	Note	Source
31 May 2010	(Scotland) Charlie Mulgrew	(Scotland) Celtic	Free	Out of Contract	
31 May 2010	(Scotland) Gary McDonald	(Scotland) Hamilton Academical	Free	Out of Contract	
6 June 2010	(Scotland) Mark Kerr	(Greece) Asteras Tripolis	Free	Out of Contract	
31 May 2010	(Scotland) Stuart Duff	(Scotland) Inverness Caledonian Thistle	Free	Out of Contract	
31 May 2010	(England) Paul Marshall	(England) Manchester City	–	Loan Return	
31 May 2010	(Scotland) Jim Paterson	(England) Plymouth Argyle	–	Loan Return	
31 May 2010	(Scotland) Steven MacLean	(England) Plymouth Argyle	–	Loan Return	
31 May 2010	(England) Stuart Nelson	(England) Notts County	Free	Out of Contract	
1 July 2010	(Italy) Davide Grassi	(Italy) Sorrento Calcio	Free	Out of Contract	
	(Scotland) Jonathan Crawford	(Scotland) Montrose	Free	Out of Contract	
	(Scotland) Nicky Clark	(Scotland) Peterhead	Free	Out of Contract	
31 August 2010	(Scotland) Ricky Foster	(Scotland) Rangers	Loan	End of season	
31 January 2011	(England) Jerel Ifil		Free transfer	Released	
2 March 2011	(Scotland) Mitchel Megginson	(Scotland) Brechin City	Loan	One month	

== Statistics ==
=== Appearances and goals ===
No.	Pos	Nat	Player	Total		SPL		Scottish Cup		League Cup	
No.	Pos	Nat	Player	Apps	Goals	Apps	Goals	Apps	Goals	Apps	Goals
1	GK	(Scotland) SCO	Jamie Langfield	38	0	30+1	0	5+0	0	2+0	0
2	DF	(Northern Ireland) NIR	Rory McArdle	36	4	27+1	2	3+1	1	4+0	1
3	DF	(Scotland) SCO	Ricky Foster	1	0	0+1	0	0+0	0	0+0	0
3	DF	(Scotland) SCO	David McNamee	13	0	9+1	0	2+0	0	1+0	0
4	MF	(Togo) TOG	Yoann Folly	20	1	18+0	1	0+0	0	2+0	0
5	DF	(Scotland) SCO	Zander Diamond	41	1	32+0	1	5+0	0	4+0	0
6	DF	(Scotland) SCO	Andrew Considine	34	0	26+1	0	4+0	0	3+0	0
7	FW	(Scotland) SCO	Chris Maguire	44	11	35+0	7	5+0	3	4+0	1
8	MF	(Scotland) SCO	Paul Hartley (c)	32	8	23+1	4	4+0	0	4+0	4
9	FW	(England) ENG	Scott Vernon	42	14	29+4	9	5+0	2	3+1	3
10	FW	(Scotland) SCO	Darren Mackie	14	1	7+4	1	0+0	0	2+1	0
11	MF	(Nigeria) NGA	Sone Aluko	33	2	27+1	2	3+1	0	1+0	0
13	DF	(Serbia) SRB	Nikola Vujadinović	25	1	13+5	1	2+3	0	1+1	0
14	MF	(Scotland) SCO	Derek Young	35	0	20+9	0	1+2	0	2+1	0
15	MF	(Scotland) SCO	Peter Pawlett	16	1	6+7	1	0+2	0	0+1	0
16	DF	(England) ENG	Jerel Ifil	20	0	13+4	0	0+0	0	3+0	0
16	DF	(Scotland) SCO	Steven Smith	20	0	15+1	0	4+0	0	0+0	0
17	MF	(Scotland) SCO	Fraser Fyvie	6	0	1+4	0	0+0	0	1+0	0
18	FW	(Lithuania) LTU	Andrius Velička	6	1	1+5	1	0+0	0	0+0	0
19	FW	(Scotland) SCO	Michael Paton	11	0	4+6	0	0+1	0	0+0	0
20	FW	(Northern Ireland) NIR	Josh Magennis	36	4	10+19	3	2+3	1	1+1	0
21	GK	(England) ENG	Mark Howard	11	0	8+1	0	0+0	0	2+0	0
22	MF	(Scotland) SCO	Ryan Jack	37	1	26+4	1	4+0	0	1+2	0
23	FW	(Scotland) SCO	Mitchel Megginson	8	0	1+5	0	0+0	0	1+1	0
24	FW	(England) ENG	Nick Blackman	18	2	10+5	2	1+2	0	0+0	0
25	DF	(England) ENG	Myles Anderson	1	0	0+1	0	0+0	0	0+0	0
27	MF	(England) ENG	Robert Milsom	23	1	18+0	1	4+0	0	1+0	0
31	DF	(Scotland) SCO	Nicky Low	1	0	0+1	0	0+0	0	0+0	0
33	DF	(Northern Ireland) NIR	Dean Jarvis	1	0	0+1	0	0+0	0	0+0	0
35	MF	(Faroe Islands) FRO	Hallur Hansson	1	0	0+1	0	0+0	0	0+0	0
37	DF	(Ireland) EIR	Joe Shaughnessy	1	0	1+0	0	0+0	0	0+0	0
42	DF	(Scotland) SCO	Clark Robertson	14	0	7+6	0	0+0	0	1+0	0
43	MF	(Scotland) SCO	Ryan Fraser	2	0	0+2	0	0+0	0	0+0	0
52	MF	(Scotland) SCO	Jack Grimmer	2	0	1+1	0	0+0	0	0+0	0

=== Disciplinary record ===
Number	Nation	Position	Name	SPL		Scottish Cup		League Cup		Total	
Number	Nation	Position	Name	Booked	Sent off (straight red)	Booked	Sent off (straight red)	Booked	Sent off (straight red)	Booked	Sent off (straight red)
6	(Scotland)	DF	Andrew Considine	9	1	0	1	0	0	9	2
8	(Scotland)	MF	Paul Hartley	6	2	0	0	1	0	7	2
7	(Scotland)	FW	Chris Maguire	6	1	0	0	0	0	6	1
2	(Republic of Ireland)	DF	Rory McArdle	4	1	0	0	1	0	5	1
19	(Scotland)	FW	Michael Paton	1	1	0	0	0	0	1	1
5	(Scotland)	DF	Zander Diamond	7	0	1	0	0	0	8	0
14	(Scotland)	MF	Derek Young	6	0	0	0	1	0	7	0
16	(Scotland)	DF	Steven Smith	4	0	0	0	0	0	4	0
1	(Scotland)	GK	Jamie Langfield	3	0	0	0	0	0	3	0
42	(Scotland)	DF	Clark Robertson	3	0	0	0	0	0	3	0
3	(Scotland)	DF	David McNamee	1	0	1	0	1	0	3	0
13	(Montenegro)	DF	Nikola Vujadinović	3	0	0	0	0	0	3	0
27	(England)	FW	Nick Blackman	2	0	0	0	0	0	2	0
4	(Togo)	MF	Yoann Folly	2	0	0	0	0	0	2	0
16	(England)	DF	Jerel Ifil	2	0	0	0	0	0	2	0
10	(Scotland)	FW	Darren Mackie	2	0	0	0	0	0	2	0
9	(England)	FW	Scott Vernon	2	0	0	0	0	0	2	0
27	(England)	MF	Robert Milsom	1	0	1	0	0	0	2	0
11	(Nigeria)	MF	Sone Aluko	1	0	0	0	0	0	1	0
43	(Scotland)	MF	Ryan Fraser	1	0	0	0	0	0	1	0
22	(Scotland)	MF	Ryan Jack	1	0	0	0	0	0	1	0

=== Goal scorers ===
Rank	Player	SPL	SC	LC	Total
1.	(England) Scott Vernon	9	3	3	15
2.	(Scotland) Chris Maguire	7	4	1	12
3.	(Scotland) Paul Hartley	4	0	4	8
4.	(Northern Ireland) Josh Magennis	3	1	0	4
5.	(Northern Ireland) Rory McArdle	2	1	1	4
6.	(Nigeria) Sone Aluko	2	0	0	2
7.	(England) Nick Blackman	2	0	0	2
8.	(Scotland) Zander Diamond	1	0	0	1
9.	(Togo) Yoann Folly	1	0	0	1
10.	(Scotland) Ryan Jack	1	0	0	1
11.	(Scotland) Darren Mackie	1	0	0	1
12.	(England) Robert Milsom	1	0	0	1
13.	(Scotland) Peter Pawlett	1	0	0	1
14.	(Lithuania) Andrius Velička	1	0	0	1
15.	(Serbia) Nikola Vujadinović	1	0	0	1
16.	Own goal	1	1	0	2

== Results and fixtures ==
=== Scottish Premier League ===
14 August 2010	Aberdeen	4–0	Hamilton Academical	Aberdeen
15:00	Hartley 19' (pen.), 40' (pen.), 65' (pen.); Diamond 51'	Report		Stadium: Pittodrie Stadium; Attendance: 12,005; Referee: McDonald

21 August 2010	St Johnstone	0–1	Aberdeen	Perth
15:00		Report	Mackie 86'	Stadium: McDiarmid Park; Attendance: 6,523; Referee: McLean

28 August 2010	Aberdeen	0–1	Kilmarnock	Aberdeen
15:00		Report	Hamill 90'	Stadium: Pittodrie Stadium; Attendance: 11,287; Referee: Winter

11 September 2010	Dundee United	3–1	Aberdeen	Dundee
15:00	Daly 3'; Howard 6' (o.g.); Goodwillie 9'	Report	Vernon 26'	Stadium: Tannadice Park; Attendance: 9,793; Referee: Tumilty

18 September 2010	Motherwell	1–1	Aberdeen	Motherwell
15:00	Murphy 35'	Report	Vernon 56'	Stadium: Fir Park; Attendance: 5,251; Referee: O'Reilly

26 September 2010	Aberdeen	2–3	Rangers	Aberdeen
12:45	Vernon 10'; Maguire 30'	Report	Miller 34' (pen.), 52'; Jelavić 67'	Stadium: Pittodrie Stadium; Attendance: 15,307; Referee: Collum

2 October 2010	Inverness Caledonian Thistle	2–0	Aberdeen	Inverness
15:00	Hayes 19'; Rooney 61'	Report		Stadium: Caledonian Stadium; Attendance: 6,144; Referee: Murray

16 October 2010	Aberdeen	0–1	Heart of Midlothian	Aberdeen
15:00		Report	Kyle 46'	Stadium: Pittodrie Stadium; Attendance: 8,999; Referee: Tumilty

29 October 2010	Aberdeen	4–2	Hibernian	Aberdeen
15:00	Maguire 18'; Vernon 32', 50'; Hartley 61' (pen.)	Report	Nish 63'; Bamba 90'	Stadium: Pittodrie Stadium; Attendance: 7,587; Referee: Thomson

30 October 2010	St Mirren	2–1	Aberdeen	Paisley
15:00	McAusland 28'; Travner 90'	Report	McArdle 57'	Stadium: St Mirren Park; Attendance: 4,589; Referee: Allan

6 November 2010	Celtic	9–0	Aberdeen	Glasgow
15:00	Stokes 26' (pen.), 45' (pen.), 74'; Hooper 28', 33', 63'; Magennis 61' (o.g.); Ledley 61'; McCourt 85' (pen.)	Report		Stadium: Celtic Park; Attendance: 46,446; Referee: Muir

10 November 2010	Aberdeen	1–2	Inverness Caledonian Thistle	Aberdeen
19:45	Velička 49'	Report	Rooney 34' (pen.); Munro 81'	Stadium: Pittodrie Stadium; Attendance: 5,917; Referee: McKendrick

13 November 2010	Rangers	2–0	Aberdeen	Glasgow
15:00	Miller 21'; Weiss 32'	Report		Stadium: Ibrox Stadium; Attendance: 44,919; Referee: Murray

20 November 2010	Aberdeen	0–1	St Johnstone	Aberdeen
15:00		Report	Diamond 83' (o.g.)	Stadium: Pittodrie Stadium; Attendance: 7,841; Referee: William Collum

27 November 2010	Kilmarnock	2–0	Aberdeen	Kilmarnock
15:00	Sammon 18'; Hamill 51' (pen.)	Report		Stadium: Rugby Park; Attendance: 5,013; Referee: Hacmon

11 December 2010	Heart of Midlothian	5–0	Aberdeen	Edinburgh
15:00	Templeton 5'; Skácel 9', 58'; Elliott 51'; Novikovas 78'	Report		Stadium: Tynecastle Stadium; Attendance: 13,434; Referee: Tumilty

26 December 2010	Hibernian	1–2	Aberdeen	Edinburgh
15:00	Riordan 45'	Report	Folly 36'; Vernon 62'	Stadium: Easter Road; Attendance: 10,115; Referee: O'Reilly

29 December 2010	Hamilton Academical	0–1	Aberdeen	Hamilton
15:00		Report	Vernon 90'	Stadium: New Douglas Park; Attendance: 2,968; Referee: Thomson

1 January 2011	Aberdeen	1–1	Dundee United	Aberdeen
15:00	Maguire 36'	Report	Goodwillie 90'	Stadium: Pittodrie Stadium; Attendance: 12,487; Referee: William Collum

15 January 2011	Aberdeen	2–0	St Mirren	Aberdeen
15:00	Vernon 50', 67'	Report		Stadium: Pittodrie Stadium; Attendance: 9,740; Referee: Murray

22 January 2011	Celtic	1–0	Aberdeen	Glasgow
15:00	Stokes 27'	Report		Stadium: Celtic Park; Attendance: 48,717; Referee: Brines

26 January 2011	Inverness Caledonian Thistle	0–2	Aberdeen	Inverness
19:45		Report	Jack 44'; Blackman 49'	Stadium: Caledonian Stadium; Attendance: 4,468; Referee: Conroy

1 February 2011	Aberdeen	0–3	Celtic	Aberdeen
19:45		Report	Hooper 12'; Wilson 75'; Stokes 78'	Stadium: Pittodrie Stadium; Attendance: 12,901; Referee: Muir

15 February 2011	Aberdeen	1–2	Motherwell	Aberdeen
19:45	Aluko 3'	Report	Jeffers 14'; Murphy 71'	Stadium: Pittodrie Stadium; Attendance: 6,882; Referee: McLean

19 February 2011	Aberdeen	5–0	Kilmarnock	Aberdeen
15:00	Vernon 14'; Aluko 25'; Maguire 59' (pen.); McArdle 70'; Magennis 82'	Report		Stadium: Pittodrie Stadium; Attendance: 7,371; Referee: Salmond

22 February 2011	Aberdeen	1–0	Hamilton Academical	Aberdeen
19:45	Maguire 30' (pen.)	Report		Stadium: Pittodrie Stadium; Attendance: 7,019; Referee: Finnie

26 February 2011	Aberdeen	0–0	Heart of Midlothian	Aberdeen
12:00		Report		Stadium: Pittodrie Stadium; Attendance: 9,100; Referee: Tumilty

2 March 2011	St Johnstone	0–0	Aberdeen	Perth
19:45		Report		Stadium: McDiarmid Park; Attendance: 2,909; Referee: Thomson

7 March 2011	Dundee United	3–1	Aberdeen	Dundee
20:00	Douglas 29'; Conway 33'; Swanson 60'	Report	Magennis 51'	Stadium: Tannadice Park; Attendance: 7,416; Referee: Winter

2 April 2011	Motherwell	2–1	Aberdeen	Motherwell
15:00	Humphrey 15'; Hutchinson 18'	Report	Vujadinović 90'	Stadium: Fir Park; Attendance: 4,458; Referee: McLean

6 April 2011	St Mirren	3–2	Aberdeen	Paisley
19:45	Higdon 6'; Dargo 57'; Thomson 68'	Report	Murray 47' (o.g.); Milsom 90'	Stadium: New St Mirren Park; Attendance: 3,489; Referee: Salmond

9 April 2011	Aberdeen	0–1	Hibernian	Aberdeen
15:00		Report	Sodje 15'	Stadium: Pittodrie Stadium; Attendance: 7,400; Referee: Madden

13 April 2011	Aberdeen	0–1	Rangers	Aberdeen
19:45		Report	Jelavić 22'	Stadium: Pittodrie Stadium; Attendance: 11,925; Referee: Murray

25 April 2011	Hamilton Academical	1–1	Aberdeen	Hamilton
16:15	Imrie 64'	Report	Blackman 75'	Stadium: New Douglas Park; Attendance: 2,140; Referee: Murray

30 April 2011	Aberdeen	1–0	Inverness Caledonian Thistle	Aberdeen
15:00	Pawlett 75'	Report		Stadium: Pittodrie Stadium; Attendance: 6,280; Referee: Salmond

7 May 2011	Aberdeen	0–2	St Johnstone	Aberdeen
15:00		Report	Smith 8' (o.g.); Adams 60'	Stadium: Pittodrie Stadium; Attendance: 6,361; Referee: McKendrick

10 May 2011	Aberdeen	0–1	St Mirren	Aberdeen
19:45		Report	Wardlaw 65'	Stadium: Pittodrie Stadium; Attendance: 5,955; Referee: Norris

14 May 2011	Hibernian	1–3	Aberdeen	Edinburgh
15:00	Riordan 21'	Report	Magennis 48'; Maguire 75', 77'	Stadium: Easter Road; Attendance: 11,767; Referee: Collum

=== Scottish League Cup ===
24 August 2010 Round 2	Alloa Athletic	0–3	Aberdeen	Alloa
19:45		Report	Hartley 18' (pen.); McArdle 38'; Maguire 60'	Stadium: Recreation Park; Attendance: 1,649; Referee: O'Reilly

22 September 2010 Round 3	Aberdeen	3–2	Raith Rovers	Aberdeen
19:45	Hartley 10' (pen.); Vernon 56', 78'	Report	Mole 24'; Tadé 38'	Stadium: Pittodrie Stadium; Attendance: 5,936; Referee: Brines

26 October 2010 Quarter final	Aberdeen	2–1	Falkirk	Aberdeen
19:45	Hartley 64', 90' (pen.)	Report	Khalis 33'	Stadium: Pittodrie Stadium; Attendance: 6,710; Referee: O'Reilly

29 January 2011 Semi final	Aberdeen	1–4	Celtic	Glasgow
15:00	Vernon 61'	Report	Commons 6'; Mulgrew 10'; Rogne 21'; Stokes 34' (pen.)	Stadium: Hampden Park; Attendance: 38,085; Referee: Thomson

=== Scottish Cup ===
8 January 2011 Round 4	Aberdeen	6–0	East Fife	Aberdeen
15:00	Maguire 13', 24', 42'; Vernon 30', 81'; Magennis 90'	Report		Stadium: Pittodrie Stadium; Attendance: 6,918; Referee: George Salmond

6 February 2011 Round 5	Aberdeen	1–0	Dunfermline Athletic	Aberdeen
15:00	McGregor 90' (o.g.)	Report		Stadium: Pittodrie Stadium; Attendance: 5,636; Referee: William Collum

12 March 2011 Quarter final	St Mirren	1–1	Aberdeen	Paisley
12:15	McGowan 77'	Report	McArdle 90+3'	Stadium: St Mirren Park; Attendance: 4,120; Referee: Euan Norris

16 March 2011 Quarter final replay	Aberdeen	2–1	St Mirren	Aberdeen
19:45	Maguire 4'; Vernon 44'	Report	Vujadinović 87' (o.g.)	Stadium: Pittodrie Stadium; Attendance: 7,330; Referee: Craig Thomson

17 April 2011 Semi final	Aberdeen	0–4	Celtic	Glasgow
12:45	Considine (red card) 18'	Report	Mulgrew 49'; Ledley 57'; Commons 63' (pen.); Maloney 84'	Stadium: Hampden Park; Attendance: 30,381; Referee: William Collum

== Competitions ==
=== Overall ===
Competition	Started round	Current position / round	Final position / round	First match	Last match
Scottish Premier League	—	—	9th	14 August 2010	14 May 2011
League Cup	2nd round	—	Semi-finals	25 August 2010	29 January 2011
Scottish Cup	4th Round	—	Semi-finals	8 January 2011	17 April 2011

Source: Competitions

=== SPL ===
==== League table ====
Pos	Team	Pld	W	D	L	GF	GA	GD	Pts
7	Inverness Caledonian Thistle	38	14	11	13	52	44	+8	53
8	St Johnstone	38	11	11	16	23	43	−20	44
9	Aberdeen	38	11	5	22	39	59	−20	38
10	Hibernian	38	10	7	21	39	61	−22	37
11	St Mirren	38	8	9	21	33	57	−24	33

Source: SPFL Archive
Rules for classification: 1) points; 2) goal difference; 3) number of goals scored.

==== Results summary ====
Overall								Home						Away					
Pld	W	D	L	GF	GA	GD	Pts	W	D	L	GF	GA	GD	W	D	L	GF	GA	GD
38	11	5	22	39	59	−20	38	6	2	11	22	21	+1	5	3	11	17	38	−21

Source: BBC Sport

==== Results by round ====
Round	1	2	3	4	5	6	7	8	9	10	11	12	13	14	15	16	17	18	19	20	21	22	23	24	25	26	27	28	29	30	31	32	33	34	35	36	37	38
Ground	H	A	H	A	A	H	A	H	H	A	A	H	A	H	A	A	A	A	H	H	A	A	H	H	H	H	H	A	A	A	A	H	H	A	H	H	H	A
Result	W	W	L	L	D	L	L	L	W	L	L	L	L	L	L	L	W	W	D	W	L	W	L	L	W	W	D	D	L	L	L	L	L	D	W	L	L	W
Position	1	1	3	3	4	6	7	9	8	8	9	9	11	11	11	12	11	10	9	9	9	9	9	9	9	9	8	8	10	10	10	10	10	10	10	10	10	9

Source: BBC Sport
A = Away; H = Home; W = Win; D = Draw; L = Loss

==== Results by opponent ====
Team	Results				Points
Team	1	2	3	4	Points
Celtic	0–9	0–1	0–3		0
Dundee United	0–1	1–1	1–3		1
Hamilton Academical	4–0	1–0	1–0	1–1	10
Heart of Midlothian	0–1	0–5	0–0		1
Hibernian	4–2	2–1	0–1	3–1	9
Inverness Caledonian Thistle	0–1	1–2	2–0	1–0	6
Kilmarnock	0–1	0–2	5–0		3
Motherwell	1–1	1–2	1–2		1
Rangers	2–3	0–2	0–1		0
St Johnstone	1–0	0–1	0–0	0–2	4
St Mirren	1–2	2–0	2–3	0–1	3

Source: 2010–11 Scottish Premier League article

== See also ==
- List of Aberdeen F.C. seasons
