= 2011–12 Blackburn Rovers F.C. season =

Blackburn Rovers
2011–12 season
- Manager: Steve Kean
- Stadium: Ewood Park
- Premier League: 19th (relegated)
- FA Cup: Third round
- League Cup: Quarter-finals
- Top goalscorer: League: Yakubu (18); All: Yakubu (18)
- Highest home attendance: 26,532 vs Manchester United (League, 2 April 2012)
- Lowest home attendance: 7,104 vs Leyton Orient (League Cup, 20 September 2011)
- Average home league attendance: 22,551
Home colours	Away colours

The 2011–12 season was Blackburn Rovers 124th season as a professional football club. The 2011–12 season is Blackburn Rovers' 18th season in the Premier League, and their 11th consecutive season in the top division of English football.

On 7 May 2012, Blackburn were relegated to the Football League Championship after a 0–1 home defeat to Wigan Athletic. They ended the season at 19th place after losing the last Premier League game 2–1 against Chelsea on 13 May 2012.

== Club ==
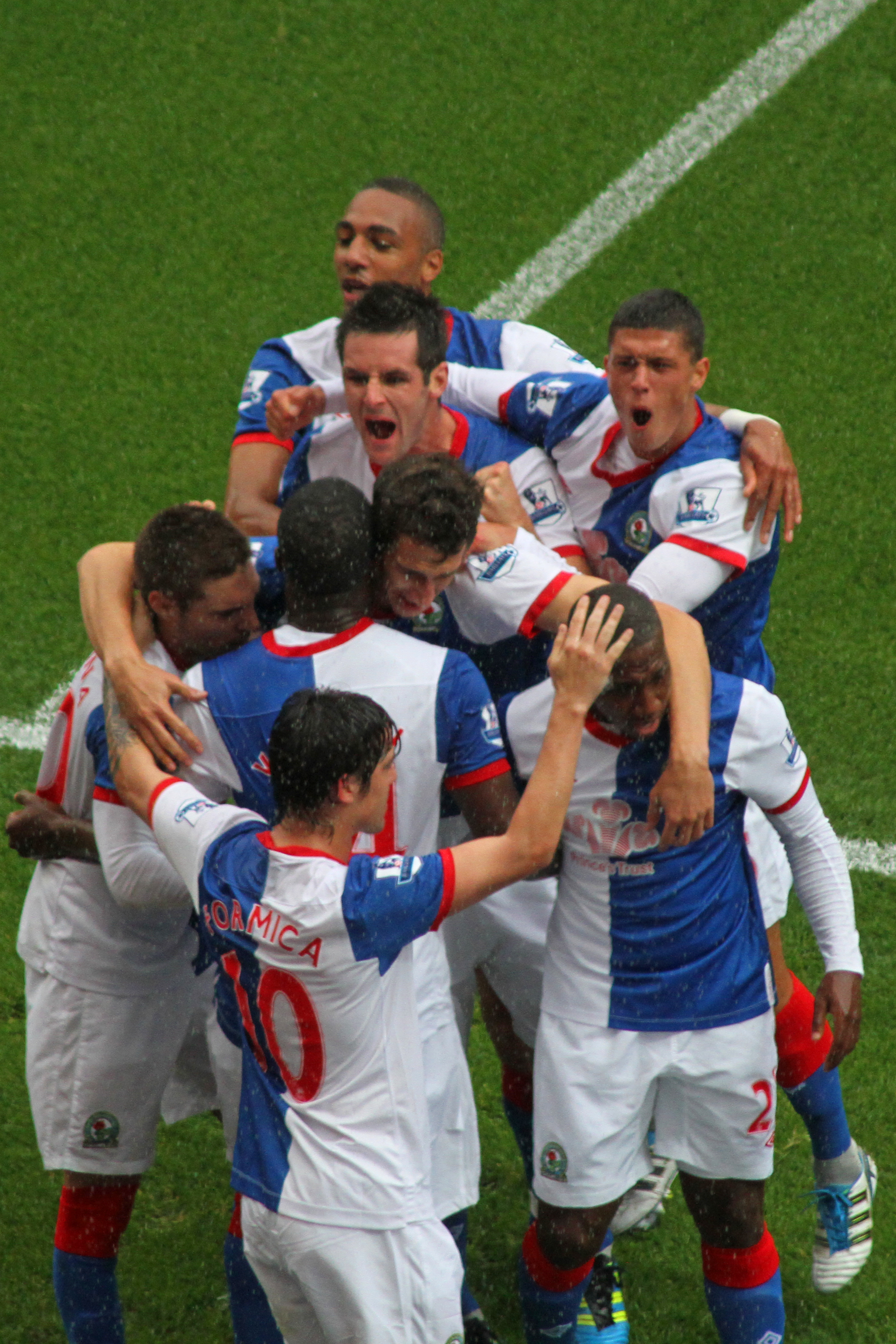
Blackburn players celebrate winning at home against Arsenal on 17 September 2011

=== Technical staff ===
Position	Staff
Head coach	Steve Kean
Assistant manager	John Jensen (until 28 September 2011); Eric Black (appointed 20 January 2012)
Assistant head coach	Paul Clement (appointed 14 October 2011) (until 6 January 2012)
Assistant coaches	Iain Brunskill; Bobby Mimms
Goalkeeping coach	Bobby Mimms
Youth coach	David Lowe

Last updated: October 2011

=== Medical staff ===
Position	Staff
Doctor	Duncan Robertson
Youth team Doctor	Chris Dalton
Physiotherapist	Dave Fevre; Mark Palmer

Last updated: October 2011

== League table ==
Pos	Team	Pld	W	D	L	GF	GA	GD	Pts	Qualification or relegation
16	Aston Villa	38	7	17	14	37	53	−16	38	
17	Queens Park Rangers	38	10	7	21	43	66	−23	37	
18	Bolton Wanderers (R)	38	10	6	22	46	77	−31	36	Relegation to Football League Championship
19	Blackburn Rovers (R)	38	8	7	23	48	78	−30	31	Relegation to Football League Championship
20	Wolverhampton Wanderers (R)	38	5	10	23	40	82	−42	25	Relegation to Football League Championship

Source: Barclays Premier League
Rules for classification: 1) points; 2) goal difference; 3) number of goals scored.
(R) Relegated

== Pre-season friendlies ==
=== First Team ===
13 July 2011 12:00	Blackburn Rovers	5–0	Oldham Athletic	Brockhall
	Roberts; Salgado; Henley	Details		Stadium: Brockhall training complex

16 July 2011 12:15	Accrington Stanley	1–2	Blackburn Rovers	Morecambe
	Guthrie 54'	Report	Andrews 15'; Kalinić 66'	Stadium: Globe Arena; Attendance: Unknown

16 July 2011 15:00	Morecambe	1–1	Blackburn Rovers	Morecambe
	Jevons 25'	Report	Formica 73'	Stadium: Globe Arena; Attendance: Unknown

27 July 2011 18:00 (11:00 GMT) 2011 Barclays Asia Trophy	Aston Villa	1–0	Blackburn Rovers	Hong Kong
	Bent 49'	Report		Stadium: Hong Kong Stadium; Attendance: 40,000 sellout credited for 2 matches

31 July 2011 18:00 (11:00 GMT) 2011 Barclays Asia Trophy	Kitchee	0–3	Blackburn Rovers	Hong Kong
		Report	Formica 35'; Dunn 70'; Blackman 86' (pen.)	Stadium: Hong Kong Stadium; Attendance: 40,000 sellout credited for 2 matches

6 August 2011 15:00	Kilmarnock	1–4	Blackburn Rovers	Kilmarnock
	Harkins 13'	Report	Dunn 15' (pen.); Roberts 16', 34' (pen.); Goodwillie 76'	Stadium: Rugby Park; Attendance: 2,283

=== Reserves ===
9 July 2011 15:00	Kendal Town	1–7	Blackburn Rovers Reserves	Kendal
	Danny Williams 1'	Report	Aaron Doran 5'; Micah Evans 25'; Jamie Maclaren 27' (pen.); James Knowles; Tom Hitchcock 60', 69'	Stadium: Lakeland Radio Stadium; Attendance: 266

19 July 2011 19:30	Bamber Bridge	2–1	Blackburn Rovers Reserves	Bamber Bridge
	Matty Jones 37'; Danny Mahoney 75' (pen.)	Report	Reece Hands 45' (pen.)	Stadium: QED Stadium; Attendance: Unknown

23 July 2011 15:00 2011 Lancashire Senior Cup Final	Preston North End	1–1 (1–3 p)	Blackburn Rovers Reserves	Leyland
	Iain Hume 73'	Report	Jamie Maclaren 56'	Stadium: County Ground; Attendance: 1,288

26 July 2011 14:00	Rangers	2–1	Blackburn Rovers Reserves	Glasgow
	Goal	Report	Jamie Maclaren	Stadium: Murray Park; Attendance: Unknown

28 July 2011 13:00	Blackburn Rovers Reserves	2–2	Bulgaria U-19	Glasgow
	Matthew Pearson; Micah Evans	Report	Goal	Stadium: Murray Park; Attendance: Unknown

31 July 2011 13:00	Blackburn Rovers Reserves	3–1	Curzon Ashton	Ashton-under-Lyne
	Ryan Edwards 56'; Curtis Haley 67'; Robbie Cotton 84'	Report	Matthew Purcell 55'	Stadium: Tameside Stadium; Attendance: Unknown

3 August 2011 19:00	Harrogate Town	0–3	Blackburn Rovers Reserves	Harrogate
		Report	Osayamen Osawe; Jadan Hall; John O'Sullivan	Stadium: Wetherby Road

10 August 2011 19:30	Chorley	1–2	Blackburn Rovers Reserves	Victory Park
	Shelton Payne	Report	Curtis Haley; Sean Cooke	Stadium: Victory Park; Attendance: 452

=== Mid-season friendlies ===
7 October 2011 14:00 *	Pune	0–3	Blackburn Rovers	Pune
		Report	Roberts 35', 78'; Rochina 52'	Stadium: Shree Shiv Chhatrapati Sports Complex

- Following the 13 July 2011 Mumbai bombings, Blackburn Rovers postponed this pre-season tour following the advice from the British Foreign office, and this includes the friendly against Pune. The original date of the fixture was 22 July 2011.

== Competitions ==
=== Premier League ===
13 August 2011 1	Blackburn Rovers	1–2	Wolverhampton Wanderers	Blackburn
15:00	Formica 20'	Report	Fletcher 22'; Ward 47'	Stadium: Ewood Park; Attendance: 21,996 (3,533 away)

20 August 2011 2	Aston Villa	3–1	Blackburn Rovers	Birmingham
15:00	Agbonlahor 12'; Heskey 25' (yellow card) 55'; Delph (yellow card) 58'; Bent 67'; Petrov (yellow card) 80'	Report	Pedersen 52'	Stadium: Villa Park; Attendance: 32,319 (250 away)

27 August 2011 3	Blackburn Rovers	0–1	Everton	Blackburn
15:00		Report	Arteta 90+2' (pen.)	Stadium: Ewood Park; Attendance: 22,826

11 September 2011 4	Fulham	1–1	Blackburn Rovers	London
16:00	Zamora 38'	Report	Rochina 32'	Stadium: Craven Cottage; Attendance: 24,856 (300 away)

17 September 2011 5	Blackburn Rovers	4–3	Arsenal	Blackburn
12:45	Yakubu 25', 59'; Song 50' (o.g.); Koscielny 68' (o.g.)	Report	Gervinho 10'; Arteta 34'; Chamakh 85'	Stadium: Ewood Park; Attendance: 22,637

24 September 2011 6	Newcastle United	3–1	Blackburn Rovers	Newcastle upon Tyne
15:00	Ba 27', 30', 54'	Report	Hoilett 37'	Stadium: St James' Park; Attendance: 46,236 (1,174 away)

1 October 2011 7	Blackburn Rovers	0–4	Manchester City	Blackburn
15:00		Report	A. Johnson 56'; Balotelli 59'; Nasri 73'; Savić 87'	Stadium: Ewood Park; Attendance: 24,760 (7,531 away)

15 October 2011 8	Queens Park Rangers	1–1	Blackburn Rovers	London
15:00	Helguson 16'	Report	Samba 24'	Stadium: Loftus Road; Attendance: 16,487 (971 away)

23 October 2011 9	Blackburn Rovers	1–2	Tottenham Hotspur	Blackburn
15:00	Formica 28'	Report	van der Vaart 15', 53'	Stadium: Ewood Park; Attendance: 22,786

29 October 2011 10	Norwich City	3–3	Blackburn Rovers	Norwich
15:00	Morison 53'; Johnson 82'; Holt 90+4' (pen.)	Report	Hoilett 45+3'; Yakubu 62'; Samba 64'	Stadium: Carrow Road; Attendance: 26,440; Referee: Anthony Taylor

5 November 2011 11	Blackburn Rovers	0–1	Chelsea	Blackburn
15:00		Report	Lampard 51'	Stadium: Ewood Park; Attendance: 21,985; Referee: Mike Dean

19 November 2011 12	Wigan Athletic	3–3	Blackburn Rovers	Wigan
15:00	Gómez 7'; Caldwell 31'; Crusat 88'	Report	Yakubu 2', 90+9' (pen.); Hoilett 59'	Stadium: DW Stadium; Attendance: 17,329; Referee: Andre Marriner

26 November 2011 13	Stoke City	3–1	Blackburn Rovers	Stoke
12:45	Delap 28'; Whelan 58'; Crouch 71'	Report	Rochina 85'	Stadium: Britannia Stadium; Attendance: 26,686 (397 away); Referee: Mark Halsey

3 December 2011 14	Blackburn Rovers	4–2	Swansea City	Blackburn
15:00	Yakubu 20', 45+2', 57', 82' (pen.)	Report	Lita 35'; Moore 66'	Stadium: Ewood Park; Attendance: 23,080; Referee: Chris Foy

11 December 2011 15	Sunderland	2–1	Blackburn Rovers	Sunderland
13:30	Vaughan 83'; Larsson 90+2'		Vukčević 17'	Stadium: Stadium of Light; Attendance: 39,863 (319 away); Referee: Peter Walton

17 December 2011 16	Blackburn Rovers	1–2	West Bromwich Albion	Blackburn
15:00	Dann 72'	Report	Morrison 52'; Odemwingie 89'	Stadium: Ewood Park; Attendance: 22,909 (2,564 away); Referee: Mark Clattenburg

20 December 2011 17	Blackburn Rovers	1–2	Bolton Wanderers	Blackburn
20:00	Yakubu 67'	Report	M. Davies 5'; Reo-Coker 30'	Stadium: Ewood Park; Attendance: 25,570 (4,300 away); Referee: Martin Atkinson

26 December 2011 18	Liverpool	1–1	Blackburn Rovers	Liverpool
15:00	Maxi 53'	Report	Adam 45' (o.g.)	Stadium: Anfield; Attendance: 44,441 (571 away); Referee: Mike Jones

31 December 2011 19	Manchester United	2–3	Blackburn Rovers	Manchester
12:45	Berbatov 52', 62'	Report	Yakubu 16' (pen.), 51'; Hanley 80'	Stadium: Old Trafford; Attendance: 75,146; Referee: Mike Dean

2 January 2012 20	Blackburn Rovers	1–2	Stoke City	Blackburn
15:00	Goodwillie 69'	Report	Crouch 17', 45'	Stadium: Ewood Park; Attendance: 20,615; Referee: Lee Mason

14 January 2012 21	Blackburn Rovers	3–1	Fulham	Blackburn
15:00	Pedersen 45+4'; Dunn 46'; Formica 79'	Report	Duff 56'	Stadium: Ewood Park; Attendance: 18,003; Referee: Anthony Taylor

21 January 2012 22	Everton	1–1	Blackburn Rovers	Everton
15:00	Cahill 24'	Report	Goodwillie 72'	Stadium: Goodison Park; Attendance: 32,464 (1,229 away)

1 February 2012 23	Blackburn Rovers	0–2	Newcastle United	Blackburn
19:45		Report	Dann 12' (o.g.); Obertan 90+2'	Stadium: Ewood Park; Attendance: 20,817; Referee: Phil Dowd

4 February 2012 24	Arsenal	7–1	Blackburn Rovers	London
13:00	van Persie 2', 38', 62'; Chamberlain 40', 54'; Arteta 51'; Henry 90+3'	Report	Pedersen 32'	Stadium: Emirates Stadium; Attendance: 59,643; Referee: Andre Marriner

11 February 2012 25	Blackburn Rovers	3–2	Queens Park Rangers	Blackburn
15:00	Yakubu 15'; Nzonzi 23'; Onuoha 45+3' (o.g.)	Report	Mackie 71', 90+2'	Stadium: Ewood Park; Attendance: 20,252; Referee: Mike Dean

25 February 2012 26	Manchester City	3–0	Blackburn Rovers	Manchester
17:30	Balotelli 30'; Agüero 52'; Džeko 81'	Report		Stadium: Etihad Stadium; Attendance: 46,782 (556 away); Referee: Mike Jones

3 March 2012 27	Blackburn Rovers	1–1	Aston Villa	Blackburn
15:00	Dunn 85'	Report	N'Zogbia 24'	Stadium: Ewood Park; Attendance: 20,717; Referee: Howard Webb

10 March 2012 28	Wolverhampton Wanderers	0–2	Blackburn Rovers	Wolverhampton
15:00		Report	Hoilett 43', 69'	Stadium: Molineux Stadium; Attendance: 26,121 (1,350 away); Referee: Chris Foy

20 March 2012 29	Blackburn Rovers	2–0	Sunderland	Blackburn
19:45	Hoilett 58'; Yakubu 86'	Report		Stadium: Ewood Park; Attendance: 20,056; Referee: Martin Atkinson

24 March 2012 30	Bolton Wanderers	2–1	Blackburn Rovers	Manchester
15:00	Wheater 28', 35'	Report	Nzonzi 56'	Stadium: Reebok Stadium; Attendance: 26,901 (2,800 away); Referee: Andre Marriner

2 April 2012 31	Blackburn Rovers	0–2	Manchester United	Blackburn
20:00	Hanley (yellow card) 54'	Report	Valencia (yellow card) 40' (goal) 81'; Young 86'	Stadium: Ewood Park; Attendance: 26,532 (7,500 away); Referee: Howard Webb

7 April 2012 32	West Bromwich Albion	3–0	Blackburn Rovers	West Bromwich
15:00	Martin Olsson 7' (o.g.); Fortuné 69'; Ridgewell 85'	Report		Stadium: The Hawthorns; Attendance: 23,414 (871 away); Referee: Lee Probert

10 April 2012 33	Blackburn Rovers	2–3	Liverpool	Blackburn
20:00	Orr (yellow card) 28'; Yakubu 36', 61' (pen.); Hoilett (yellow card) 62'; Formica (yellow card) 64'; Hanley (yellow card) 90'		Flanagan (yellow card) 12'; Maxi 13', 16' (yellow card) 45+1'; Doni (red card) 25'; Jones (yellow card) 61'; Bellamy (yellow card) 72'; Henderson (yellow card) 86'; Carroll 90'	Stadium: Ewood Park; Attendance: 23,517 (7,500 away); Referee: Paul Taylor

14 April 2012 34	Swansea City	3–0	Blackburn Rovers	Swansea
15:00 GMT	Sigurðsson 37'; Dyer 43'; Dann 63' (o.g.)	Report	Hoilett (yellow card) 33'; Formica (yellow card) 90+1'	Stadium: Liberty Stadium; Attendance: 18,985 (680 away); Referee: Mark Clattenburg

21 April 2012 35	Blackburn Rovers	2–0	Norwich City	Blackburn
15:00 GMT	Formica 41'; Hoilett 49'	Report		Stadium: Ewood Park; Attendance: 23,218; Referee: Kevin Friend

29 April 2012 36	Tottenham Hotspur	2–0	Blackburn Rovers	London
16:00 GMT	van der Vaart 22'; Walker 75'	Report		Stadium: White Hart Lane; Attendance: 35,798 (207 away); Referee: Mike Jones

7 May 2012 37	Blackburn Rovers	0–1	Wigan Athletic	Blackburn
20:00 GMT		Report	Alcaraz 87'	Stadium: Ewood Park; Attendance: 26,144

13 May 2012 38	Chelsea	2–1	Blackburn Rovers	London
15:00 GMT	Terry 31'; Raul Meireles 34'	Report	Yakubu 60'	Stadium: Stamford Bridge; Attendance: 40,742 (448 away); Referee: Lee Mason

=== Results by Round ===
Match	1	2	3	4	5	6	7	8	9	10	11	12	13	14	15	16	17	18	19	20	21	22	23	24	25	26	27	28	29	30	31	32	33	34	35	36	37	38
Ground	H	A	H	A	H	A	H	A	H	A	H	A	A	H	A	H	H	A	H	A	H	A	H	A	H	A	H	A	H	A	H	A	H	A	H	A	H	A
Result	L	L	L	D	W	L	L	D	L	D	L	D	L	W	L	L	L	D	W	L	W	D	L	L	W	L	D	W	W	L	L	L	L	L	W	L	L	L
Position	15	19	19	20	16	18	19	20	20	18	19	20	20	18	19	19	20	20	17	20	18	18	19	20	18	18	17	16	16	16	18	18	19	19	19	19	19	19

=== FA Cup ===
7 January 2012 Third round	Newcastle United	2–1	Blackburn Rovers	Newcastle upon Tyne
15:00 GMT	Ben Arfa 70'; Jonás 90+5'	Report	Goodwillie 35'	Stadium: St James' Park; Attendance: 30,876 (357 away)

=== League Cup ===
24 August 2011 Second round	Blackburn Rovers	3–1	Sheffield Wednesday	Blackburn
20:00 BST	Rochina 3', 4'; Goodwillie 7'	Report	Morrison 50'	Stadium: Ewood Park; Attendance: 8,607

20 September 2011 Third round	Blackburn Rovers	3–2	Leyton Orient	Blackburn
20:00 BST	Roberts 44' (pen.); Rochina 71'; Vukčević 75'	Report	Mooney 64'; Cox 86'	Stadium: Ewood Park; Attendance: 7,104

26 October 2011 Fourth round	Blackburn Rovers	4–3 (a.e.t.)	Newcastle United	Blackburn
20:00 BST	Rochina 5'; Yakubu 64' (pen.); Pedersen 99'; Givet 120'	Report	Guthrie 90+3'; Cabaye 90+6'; Løvenkrands 105+3'	Stadium: Ewood Park; Attendance: 10,682 (4,500 away)

29 November 2011 Quarter-finals	Cardiff City	2–0	Blackburn Rovers	Cardiff
19:45 GMT	Miller 19'; Gerrard 50'	Report		Stadium: Cardiff City Stadium; Attendance: 19,436 (800 away)

== Squad statistics ==
=== Appearances and goals ===
As of 13 May 2012

No.	Pos	Nat	Player	Total		Premier League		FA Cup		League Cup	
No.	Pos	Nat	Player	Apps	Goals	Apps	Goals	Apps	Goals	Apps	Goals
1	GK	(England) ENG	Paul Robinson	34	0	34	0	0	0	0	0
3	DF	(Sweden) SWE	Martin Olsson	30	0	23+4	0	1	0	2	0
5	DF	(France) FRA	Gaël Givet	26	1	21+1	0	1	0	3	1
8	MF	(England) ENG	David Dunn	28	2	21+5	2	0	0	1+1	0
9	FW	(France) FRA	Anthony Modeste	9	0	3+6	0	0	0	0	0
10	MF	(Argentina) ARG	Mauro Formica	38	4	25+9	4	0+1	0	2+1	0
11	MF	(Australia) AUS	Vince Grella	2	0	0+1	0	0+0	0	1+0	0
12	MF	(Norway) NOR	Morten Gamst Pedersen	36	3	33	3	1	0	2	0
13	GK	(England) ENG	Mark Bunn	7	0	3	0	1	0	3	0
14	MF	(Serbia) SRB	Radosav Petrović	23	0	10+9	0	1	0	3	0
15	MF	(France) FRA	Steven Nzonzi	34	2	31+1	2	1	0	1	0
16	DF	(England) ENG	Scott Dann	28	1	27	1	0	0	1	0
18	MF	(England) ENG	Bradley Orr	12	0	10+2	0	0	0	0	0
19	FW	(England) ENG	Jordan Slew	2	0	0+1	0	0+1	0	0	0
20	FW	(Spain) ESP	Rubén Rochina	22	6	9+9	2	1	0	2+1	4
21	MF	(Sweden) SWE	Marcus Olsson	12	0	10+2	0	0	0	0	0
22	FW	(England) ENG	Nick Blackman	3	0	0+1	0	0	0	2	0
23	FW	(Canada) CAN	Junior Hoilett	37	7	35	7	0	0	0+2	0
24	FW	(Nigeria) NGR	Yakubu	32	18	29+1	17	0	0	0+2	1
25	FW	(Scotland) SCO	David Goodwillie	23	4	4+16	2	1	1	2	1
29	MF	(Montenegro) MNE	Simon Vukčević	9	2	4+3	1	1	0	1	1
31	DF	(Scotland) SCO	Grant Hanley	27	1	19+4	1	1	0	3	0
32	DF	(Brazil) BRA	Bruno Ribeiro	0	0	0	0	0	0	0	0
33	DF	(England) ENG	Josh Morris	2	0	0+2	0	0	0	0	0
34	GK	(England) ENG	Jake Kean	1	0	1	0	0	0	0	0
35	MF	(England) ENG	Jason Lowe	36	0	30+2	0	0+1	0	2+1	0
36	MF	(Algeria) ALG	Amine Linganzi	0	0	0	0	0	0	0	0
37	FW	(England) ENG	Zac Aley	0	0	0	0	0	0	0	0
38	DF	(England) ENG	Myles Anderson	0	0	0	0	0	0	0	0
39	DF	(Wales) WAL	Adam Henley	8	0	4+3	0	1	0	0	0
40	MF	(England) ENG	Robbie Cotton	0	0	0+0	0	0+0	0	0+0	0
Players that played for Blackburn Rovers this season that have left the club:
4	DF	(Republic of the Congo) CGO	Christopher Samba	15	2	15	2	0	0	0	0
6	DF	(New Zealand) NZL	Ryan Nelsen	1	0	1	0	0	0	0	0
7	MF	(Australia) AUS	Brett Emerton	3	0	2	0	0	0	1	0
30	FW	(Grenada) GRN	Jason Roberts	11	1	4+5	0	0	0	1+1	1
Players that played for Blackburn Rovers this season that have been stripped of shirt number:
2	DF	(Spain) ESP	Míchel Salgado (removed from 1st team duty)*	9	0	9	0	0	0	0	0

- Due to clauses in Salgado's contracts regarding an automatic payrise and a one-year extension to his current contract, he was excluded from first team duty.

=== Top scorers ===
Place	Position	Nation	Number	Name	Premier League	FA Cup	League Cup	Total
1	FW		24	Yakubu	17	0	1	18
2	FW		20	Rubén Rochina	2	1	4	7
2	MF		23	Junior Hoilett	7	0	0	7
4	FW		25	David Goodwillie	2	1	1	4
4	MF		12	Morten Gamst Pedersen	3	0	1	4
4				Own Goals	4	0	0	4
7	MF		10	Mauro Formica	3	0	0	3
8	MF		8	David Dunn	2	0	0	2
8	MF		15	Steven Nzonzi	2	0	0	2
8	DF		4	Christopher Samba	2	0	0	2
8	FW		29	Simon Vukčević	1	0	1	2
11	DF		16	Scott Dann	1	0	0	1
11	DF		5	Gaël Givet	0	0	1	1
11	DF		31	Grant Hanley	1	0	0	1
11	FW		30	Jason Roberts	0	0	1	1
				TOTALS	47	1	10	53

=== Disciplinary record ===
Number	Nation	Position	Name	Premier League		FA Cup		League Cup		Total	
Number	Nation	Position	Name	Yellow card	Red card	Yellow card	Red card	Yellow card	Red card	Yellow card	Red card
8		MF	David Dunn	3	1	0	0	0	0	3	1
3		DF	Martin Olsson	3	1	0	0	1	0	4	1
8		DF	Gaël Givet	2	1	0	0	0	0	2	1
9		FW	Anthony Modeste	1	1	0	0	0	0	1	1
24		FW	Yakubu	1	1	0	0	0	0	1	1
35		MF	Jason Lowe	10	0	0	0	1	0	11	0
15		MF	Steven Nzonzi	7	0	0	0	0	0	7	0
31		DF	Grant Hanley	5	0	0	0	0	0	5	0
12		MF	Morten Gamst Pedersen	5	0	0	0	0	0	5	0
2		DF	Míchel Salgado	4	0	0	0	0	0	4	0
23		MF	Junior Hoilett	2	0	0	0	1	0	3	0
16		DF	Scott Dann	2	0	0	0	0	0	2	0
14		MF	Radosav Petrović	2	0	0	0	0	0	2	0
30		FW	Jason Roberts	2	0	0	0	0	0	2	0
20		FW	Rubén Rochina	2	0	0	0	0	0	2	0
4		DF	Christopher Samba	2	0	0	0	0	0	2	0
13		GK	Mark Bunn	0	0	1	0	0	0	1	0
7		MF	Brett Emerton	1	0	0	0	0	0	1	0
10		MF	Mauro Formica	1	0	0	0	0	0	1	0
21		MF	Marcus Olsson	1	0	0	0	0	0	1	0
18		DF	Bradley Orr	1	0	0	0	0	0	1	0
			TOTALS	57	5	1	0	3	0	61	5

== Transfers ==
=== In ===
Date	Pos.	Name	From	Fee	Source
1 July 2011	DF	Myles Anderson	Aberdeen	Undisclosed fee *(rep. minimal fee)	
4 August 2011	FW	David Goodwillie	Dundee United	Undisclosed fee *(rep. £2.8 million)	
10 August 2011	MF	Radosav Petrović	Partizan	Undisclosed fee *(rep. £2.7 million)	
22 August 2011	DF	Bruno Ribeiro	Grêmio Prudente	Free transfer/End of contract	
26 August 2011	MF	Simon Vukčević	Sporting CP	Undisclosed fee *(rep. £2 million)	
31 August 2011	FW	Yakubu	Everton	Undisclosed fee *(rep. £1.5 million)	
31 August 2011	DF	Scott Dann	Birmingham City	Undisclosed fee *(rep. £6m-£8m)	
31 August 2011	FW	Jordan Slew	Sheffield United	Undisclosed fee *(rep. £1m)	
17 January 2012	MF	Tim Payne	Waitakere United	Undisclosed fee *(rep. minimal fee)	
31 January 2012	MF	Marcus Olsson	Free agent	Free transfer	
31 January 2012	DF	Bradley Orr	Queens Park Rangers	Undisclosed fee *(rep. minimal fee)	

Summer total spending: ▼ Undisclosed fee *(rep. minimal fee) £16 million-£18 million + additional undisclosed fees & add-ons

January total spending: ▼ Undisclosed fee *(rep. minimal fee)

=== Out ===
Date	Pos.	Name	To	Fee	Source
9 May 2011	GK	Frank Fielding	Derby County	Undisclosed fee *(rep. £400,000)	
June 2011	DF	Zurab Khizanishvili	Kayserispor	Free transfer/End of contract	
June/July 2011	GK	Jason Brown	Aberdeen	Free transfer/End of contract	
13 June 2011	DF	Phil Jones	Manchester United	Undisclosed fee *(rep. £16.5m-£22m plus add ons)	
June 2011	MF	Michael Potts	York City	Free transfer/End of contract	
July 2011	CF	Maceo Rigters	Gold Coast United	End of contract	
July 2011	MF	Jordan Bowen	Chorley	Free transfer/End of contract	
July 2011	DF	Damilola Ajagbe	Free agent	End of contract	
July 2011	DF	Andy Parry	Free agent	End of contract	
July 2011	FW	Toni Vastić	Bayern Munich II	Minimal fee	
July 2011	FW	Benjani	Portsmouth	Free transfer/End of contract	
13 July 2011	MF	Aaron Doran	Inverness Caledonian Thistle	Undisclosed fee *(rep. 50% sell on fee)	
11 August 2011	FW	Nikola Kalinić	FC Dnipro	Undisclosed fee *(rep. £7m)	
12 August 2011	DF	Gavin Gunning	Dundee United	Undisclosed fee	
25 August 2011	MF	Brett Emerton	Sydney FC	Undisclosed fee	
1 September 2011	MF	El Hadji Diouf	Free agent	Mutually agreed contract termination	
October 2011	DF	Cameron Lindsay	Free agent (later signed for) Wellington Phoenix	Released	
26 January 2012	FW	Jason Roberts	Reading	Undisclosed fee *(rep. £500,000)	
31 January 2012	MF	Keith Andrews	Free agent (later signed for) West Brom	Released	
1 February 2012	DF	Ryan Nelsen	Free agent (later signed for) Tottenham Hotspur	Released	
2 February 2012	FW	Tom Hitchcock	Free agent	Released	
24 February 2012	CB	Christopher Samba	Anzhi	Undisclosed fee *(rep. £11 million)	

Summer total income: ▲ Undisclosed fee *(rep. minimal fee) £23.9 million-£29.4 million + Undisclosed fees

January total income: ▲ Undisclosed fee *(rep.£11.5 million)

=== Loan in ===
Date from	Date to	Pos.	Name	From	Source
19 January 2012	31 July 2012	FW	Anthony Modeste	FC Girondins de Bordeaux	

=== Loan out ===
Date from	Date to	Pos.	Name	To	Source
31 June 2011	31 October 2011	FW	Tom Hitchcock	Plymouth Argyle	
2 August 2011	5 November 2011	GK	Jake Kean	Rochdale	
12 August 2011	31 January 2012	MF	Keith Andrews	Ipswich Town	
31 October 2011	31 July 2012	FW	Micah Evans	Accrington Stanley	
23 November 2011	26 January 2012	MF	Hérold Goulon	Doncaster Rovers	
1 February 2012	31 July 2012	FW	Filip Pivkovski	FC Nordsjælland	
