= 2009–10 Plymouth Argyle F.C. season =

English football club season

Plymouth Argyle
2009–10 season
- Chairman: Sir Roy Gardner
- Manager: Paul Sturrock (until 10 December); Paul Mariner (from 10 December)
- Championship: 23rd (Relegated)
- FA Cup: Third round (knocked out by Newcastle United)
- League Cup: First round (knocked out by Gillingham)
- Top goalscorer: League: Jamie Mackie (8); All: Jamie Mackie (8)
- Highest home attendance: League: 14,792 vs. Nottingham Forest (27 September 2009); All: 16,451 vs. Newcastle United (2 January 2010)
- Lowest home attendance: 7,243 vs. Barnsley (30 March 2010)
- Average home league attendance: 10,316
Home colours	Away colours

The 2009–10 season was the 115th season in the history of Plymouth Argyle Football Club, their 85th in the Football League, and 41st in the second tier of the English football league system. Their 21st-place finish in the 2008–09 season meant it was their sixth successive season playing in the Championship. Their campaign ended disappointingly as they were relegated to League One with 11 wins, 8 draws, and 27 losses from 46 matches. The club exited both domestic cup competitions at the first stage, being eliminated by Newcastle United in the third round of the FA Cup and by Gillingham in the first round of the League Cup. The club changed managers in December due to a string of poor results as Paul Sturrock was replaced by Paul Mariner.

The club began their league campaign with two draws, but defeat by Cardiff City marked the beginning of a seven-game losing streak. Results improved in October and November before three more successive defeats saw Sturrock replaced by Mariner. Performances gradually improved and the club won both of their fixtures during the Christmas period, including a 4–1 win against Reading; their best of the season. The club signed Damien Johnson in the winter transfer window from Birmingham City and made a number of signings on loan, including Kenny Cooper and David Stockdale, in order to try to improve their league position. A succession of draws and narrow defeats followed in February, which prompted Mariner to make more signings.

Argyle lost three of their next nine matches to give themselves a chance of avoiding relegation, but their win at Doncaster Rovers proved to be the last game that they would collect any points in. Defeats at home to Middlesbrough and away to Watford left the club on the brink of a return to England's third tier, and that was confirmed in their next game. Newcastle United won 2–0 at Home Park to secure the Championship title, and relegated the home side at the same time. The club finished 23rd in the league table after defeat by bottom club Peterborough United on the final day of the season, eight points adrift of safety. Jamie Mackie finished as the club's top scorer with eight goals in all competitions, and captain Carl Fletcher was voted Player of the Year.

== Background ==
The 2008–09 season was Paul Sturrock's first full campaign in his second spell as the club's manager. The club secured their status in the second tier of English football for a sixth season after finishing 21st in the league table, five points above Norwich City. A number of players returned to their parent clubs at the end of the season after successful loan spells, including Craig Cathcart, David Gray, Alan Judge and Paul Gallagher. Sturrock wanted to bring Gallagher back to the club on a permanent basis, but was eventually unsuccessful after admitting before the season finished that the transfer fee and wages were an issue. Three apprentices of the club's youth system were offered professional contracts in May, including Irish youth international Joe Mason. The club's first signing of the summer was Carl Fletcher, who returned to Home Park permanently after signing on loan in February. Fletcher replaced Karl Duguid as the team captain, and Romain Larrieu was named club captain. Sir Roy Gardner was confirmed as the club's new chairman in July, replacing Paul Stapleton who remained on the new board as vice-chairman. The club added to their squad that month with the permanent signings of Bradley Wright-Phillips, Kári Árnason and Réda Johnson, while Jermaine Easter and long-serving Frenchman Mathias Kouo-Doumbé were among the players who left. Doumbe was released from his contract by mutual consent in August after five years with the club.

== Championship ==
=== August–October ===
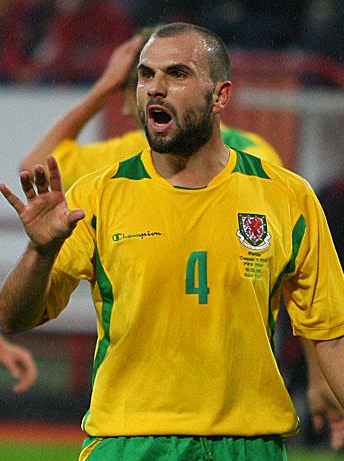
Carl Fletcher was appointed as team captain after signing for the club.

Plymouth Argyle began their campaign at Selhurst Park on 8 August against Crystal Palace, with Carl Fletcher captaining his new side against his former club. An early goal from Hungarian international centre-back Krisztián Timár put Argyle ahead but the home side responded in the second half to give both teams a share of the points. Argyle faced Queens Park Rangers in their first home game of the season and an injury-time own goal from Kaspars Gorkšs salvaged a point after the visitors had taken the lead in the first-half. Alan Gow's first goal for the club in their next match against Cardiff City was merely a consolation, as a hat-trick from Michael Chopra consigned Argyle to their first league defeat of the season. A stoppage time goal from Derby County's Miles Addison denied Argyle their third draw of the season after they had taken a first-half lead through Alan Judge, and a second 3–1 home defeat followed a week later, this time against Sheffield Wednesday. A first-half goal from Jamie Mackie gave Argyle hope of their first victory of new the season at The Hawthorns against West Bromwich Albion, but the home side responded with three goals either side of half-time to claim a comfortable win.

The club's poor run of form continued in their next home match against Watford, as they suffered their fifth straight defeat and slipped to the bottom of the league table. Another 3–1 defeat, against Newcastle United, was followed by a second successive 1–0 home defeat against Nottingham Forest, to leave Argyle with just two points from their first seven matches. Paul Sturrock kept faith with the young defensive pairing of James Chester and Shane Lowry for their next game against Peterborough United, and two second-half goals Mackie and Rory Fallon secured Argyle's first three points of the new season. "It's nice to get three points, but now we have to build on it," said Sturrock. "There's no point in us getting this result and then kicking ourselves in the teeth again." Argyle earned their first home win of the season four days later against Scunthorpe United. A penalty from Judge gave the hosts a 2–1 win after Fallon's opening goal was cancelled out by Scunthorpe striker Gary Hooper. Their upturn in results was halted by Blackpool, who won 2–0 at Bloomfield Road. The hosts opening goal was scored by Marcel Seip, a player on loan from Argyle. He took part in the match following a request from former manager Ian Holloway, a decision which was criticised by supporters but defended by senior Argyle officials. "I suppose it was bound to happen that Marcel would score the goal, but I don't think we should look on it as anything other than probably the cover should have been better," said executive director Keith Todd. "We understood exactly what we are doing."

An Argyle Hall of Famer returned to Home Park on 18 October 2009, when former England international Paul Mariner was appointed as the club's new head coach. "In football, there is not much sentiment. But, if sentiment is involved in this scenario, then they gave me my very first chance as a player so I grabbed it with both hands," said Mariner on the New England Revolution website, the club he left to rejoin Argyle. "Plymouth Argyle are in my blood. Obviously the teams you're associated with are the ones you look for every week, and when they came knocking on my door asking me to be employed there, I was delighted." His first match in the dugout alongside Sturrock ended in disappointment as Argyle lost 3–1 to Bristol City at Ashton Gate. They faced Ipswich Town, another side struggling for form, at home in their next match and a first-half goal from Fletcher put Argyle ahead, but their hopes of claiming three points were dented when the visitors equalised through striker Jon Stead, who capitalised on a poor back pass from Gary Sawyer. Welshman Darcy Blake, on loan from Cardiff City, was shown a straight red card late in the game as it ended all square. Their final game of October took place on Halloween against Middlesbrough, in Gordon Strachan's first game as their new manager. Argyle came away from the Riverside Stadium with all three points, in a game that saw Adam Johnson miss from the penalty spot, thanks to a second-half goal from Mackie to lift them to 22nd in the league table, within three points of Doncaster Rovers.

=== November–February ===
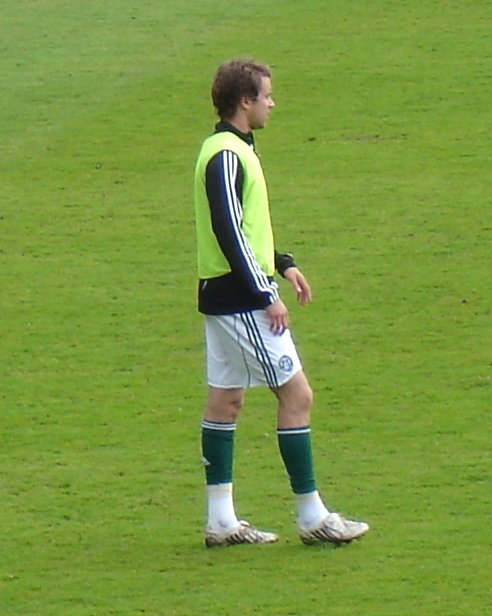
Kári Árnason scored his first goal for the club against Reading in December.

The club began November in the same fashion they ended the previous month – with a win. Judge and Fallon scored again to secure a 2–1 home victory against Doncaster Rovers, and pull Argyle clear of the relegation zone. They looked like earning a valuable point when they travelled to play Leicester City but were denied by a 94th-minute goal from midfielder Andy King. Another home defeat, this time to Sheffield United followed, which left Sturrock desperate to improve morale among his squad, but a third consecutive 1–0 defeat at Swansea City, during which Lowry was sent off, signalled the end of Paul Sturrock's second spell as manager. Paul Mariner was placed in charge until further notice. "It's a sad day, but obviously a happy day for me because I'm getting my chance to be a manager in the league," said the former striker. "He's a great friend of mine. The bond that we have together is quite remarkable and we have a mutual respect for each other." His first match was a 2–0 defeat at Preston North End, but he took positives from the performance.

John Carver, right-hand man to former Barcelona manager Sir Bobby Robson at Newcastle United, arrived as the club's new assistant manager on 17 December 2009, but the club suffered another 1–0 defeat at home, against Coventry City, two days later. Argyle travelled to Cardiff on Boxing Day to play Cardiff City at their new stadium, and came away with an important three points thanks to a late goal from Sawyer. They recorded their biggest win of the season two days later against Reading. A brace from Judge, and first goals of the season for Kári Árnason and Ashley Barnes secured a 4–1 win at Home Park and six points from their two games over the Christmas period. Argyle returned to league action after their FA Cup ties on 16 January, looking for another three points against Crystal Palace but an early goal from young striker Victor Moses won the game for the visitors. Another must-win home game followed against Derby County and a fifth goal of the season from Jamie Mackie boosted their survival bid. A defeat by fellow struggler's Sheffield Wednesday, coupled with other results going against them, left Argyle five points from safety, with a tough match to come against West Bromwich Albion a week later. A single goal from striker Simon Cox kept Albion in touch at the top of the table and left Argyle deep in relegation trouble again, six points from safety.

A stoppage time penalty from Shane Long earned a crucial 2–1 win for Reading in Argyle's next match, but they came from a goal behind to claim a 3–1 victory at Barnsley four days later, which included a 35-yard effort from former Barnsley player Fallon. Paul Mariner was full of praise for his team and singled out youngster Yannick Bolasie, who made his debut for the club. "We played with intellect. We got the ball down, rather than panicking a little bit; we stroked it around; we retained position at vital times," he said. "The introduction of Bolasie was a breath of fresh air. I think even the Barnsley fans would probably say they liked to see what he was doing. He brought a lot to the table for us." A double-header of home matches were next on the agenda for Argyle, against Swansea City and Leicester City, and they both ended in 1–1 draws. New signing Damien Johnson scored late on against Swansea, and Craig Noone scored his first goal of the season to earn a point against Leicester. An end-to-end game at Bramall Lane against Sheffield United ended in a 4–3 defeat, which included a number of defensive mistakes. Argyle went 3–0 before finally sparking into life, scoring twice thanks to Bolasie and a first for young Irish striker Joe Mason. A lapse in concentration from David Stockdale, on loan from Fulham, gifted the hosts a fourth goal before a 20-yard volley from Mackie set up a frantic finale. In the aftermath, Paul Mariner heaped praise on Mason, describing him as "an incredible talent."

=== March–May ===
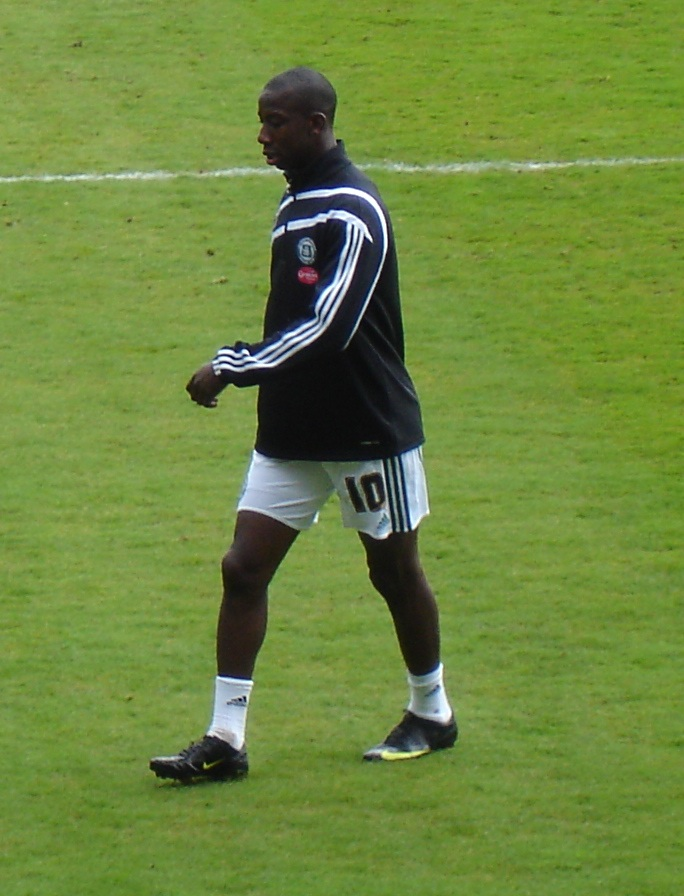
Bradley Wright-Phillips returned from injury to score three important goals.

Argyle salvaged a late point against Preston North End at the start of March, but remained in serious trouble at the bottom end of the table, seven points adrift of safety with 13 matches remaining. A 2–0 defeat followed at Queens Park Rangers, with Adel Taarabt playing a part in both of the home side's goals. Draws at Home Park were proving to be an Achilles' heel for Argyle, but they secured a creditable 1–1 draw at play-off chasing Coventry City, having taken the lead through a glancing header from Árnason. Three days later, a 20-yard strike from captain Fletcher earned Argyle their fifth home win of the season in a 3–2 thriller against Bristol City. They had taken a 2–0 lead through Chris Clark and an overhead kick from Bradley Wright-Phillips, his first for the club. However, the visitors responded in the second-half with two goals from Nicky Maynard before former Welsh international Fletcher scored with seconds to spare. Argyle travelled to play Scunthorpe United looking to keep up the momentum, but threw away a lead to be defeated by a deflected effort from Martyn Woolford.

They were on the road again three days later when they faced Ipswich Town at Portman Road. Argyle came away with all three points courtesy of goals from Wright-Phillips and Mason on what was a special night for Paul Mariner. "It was pretty special and I was a little choked up," he said. "It was a special night. When I moved to the States 20 years ago, I didn't think it would come to fruition but it was a tremendous reception from the fans, and I can't thank them enough. Bringing Plymouth Argyle here in my present role was a special occasion." Former manager Ian Holloway returned to Home Park for the first time since his departure in November 2007 in the club's next game, and he left happy as Blackpool side claimed all three points after a 2–0 victory, with Charlie Adam at the heart of their attacking threat. Argyle played out an entertaining 0–0 draw at home with Barnsley three days later, but it did little to help in their battle against relegation, still five points away from safety. They produced another rousing away performance against Doncaster Rovers to earn a 2–1 win, coming from behind with second-half goals from Mason, and an injury time header from Wright-Phillips. In order to stay up, Argyle knew that they had to make the most of their remaining home games, but they went down 2–0 on 5 April to an efficient Middlesbrough side, which left them four points adrift with four games left. A solitary goal from Watford's Heidar Helguson dealt Argyle's survival hopes an almost fatal blow at Vicarage Road, but vice-captain Karl Duguid remained upbeat about their chances of defeating the league leaders in their next game. "We'll be upbeat, and we'll go for the win against Newcastle next Monday."

It was a night of contrasting emotions at Home Park. A 2–0 win for the visitors confirmed Argyle's relegation to League One and Newcastle's promotion back to the Premier League as champions at the first attempt. Hours after the match, the club's board declared that it remained determined to steer it to the top flight of English football. Paul Mariner reaffirmed his commitment to the club, vowing to put things right. "I feel the pain of the supporters because this is the club that gave me my first start," he said. "The reason I came here was because of the vision that the club can get into the Premiership. Now we've got another couple of hurdles before we do that but I firmly believe that we can do it." Argyle's penultimate game of the season took place at the City Ground against Nottingham Forest, who had already qualified for the play-off's, and they secured a comfortable 3–0 victory against the relegated side. The club signed off their campaign with another home defeat against Peterborough United on 2 May. Argyle took the lead in the first-half from a fine individual goal from Wright-Phillips but conceded two goals after the break to Craig Mackail-Smith. Four days later, the club announced that they would be searching for a new manager, with Paul Mariner reverting to his original role as head coach. He said: "I am disappointed that we could not produce the results we wanted last season. I am a realist and understand why and how the board came to the conclusion they have done. I am committed to this club and want only to help it regain Championship status as soon as possible and build on that." Work on a new state-of-the-art Fibrelastic pitch at Home Park began the following week.

=== Results ===
8 August 2009 Match 1	Crystal Palace	1–1	Plymouth Argyle	Selhurst Park, London
15:00 BST	Lee 62'	Report	Timár 5'	Attendance: 14,358; Referee: Andy Penn

15 August 2009 Match 2	Plymouth Argyle	1–1	Queens Park Rangers	Home Park, Plymouth
15:00 BST	Gorkšs 90+3' (o.g.)	Report	Helguson 43'	Attendance: 11,588; Referee: Roger East

18 August 2009 Match 3	Plymouth Argyle	1–3	Cardiff City	Home Park, Plymouth
19:45 BST	Gow 90' (pen.)	Report	Chopra 4', 80', 85' (pen.)	Attendance: 11,918; Referee: Russell Booth

22 August 2009 Match 4	Derby County	2–1	Plymouth Argyle	Pride Park Stadium, Derby
15:00 BST	Buxton 40'; Addison 90'	Report	Judge 17' (pen.)	Attendance: 26,186; Referee: Craig Pawson

29 August 2009 Match 5	Plymouth Argyle	1–3	Sheffield Wednesday	Home Park, Plymouth
15:00 BST	Gow 80'	Report	Wood 33'; Tudgay 72' (pen.), 90+2'	Attendance: 10,228; Referee: Andy Haines

12 September 2009 Match 6	West Bromwich Albion	3–1	Plymouth Argyle	The Hawthorns, West Bromwich
15:00 BST	Martis 34'; Čech 40', 86'	Report	Mackie 12'	Attendance: 22,190; Referee: Graham Salisbury

15 September 2009 Match 7	Plymouth Argyle	0–1	Watford	Home Park, Plymouth
19:45 BST		Report	Cleverley 4'	Attendance: 8,703; Referee: Graham Scott

19 September 2009 Match 8	Newcastle United	3–1	Plymouth Argyle	St James' Park, Newcastle
15:00 BST	Taylor 6'; Nolan 61'; Carroll 84'	Report	Duguid 50'	Attendance: 42,898; Referee: Scott Mathieson

27 September 2009 Match 9	Plymouth Argyle	0–1	Nottingham Forest	Home Park, Plymouth
13:15 BST		Report	Gunter 45+2'	Attendance: 14,792; Referee: Andy Woolmer

29 September 2009 Match 10	Peterborough United	1–2	Plymouth Argyle	London Road, Peterborough
19:45 BST	Mackail-Smith 86'	Report	Mackie 63'; Fallon 69'	Attendance: 7,114; Referee: Andy Hall

3 October 2009 Match 11	Plymouth Argyle	2–1	Scunthorpe United	Home Park, Plymouth
15:00 BST	Fallon 57'; Judge 76' (pen.)	Report	Hooper 75' (pen.)	Attendance: 9,780; Referee: Andy D'Urso

17 October 2009 Match 12	Blackpool	2–0	Plymouth Argyle	Bloomfield Road, Blackpool
15:00 BST	Seip 31'; Vaughan 63'	Report		Attendance: 7,765; Referee: David Webb

20 October 2009 Match 13	Bristol City	3–1	Plymouth Argyle	Ashton Gate, Bristol
19:45 BST	Haynes 72'; McCombe 76'; Maynard 79'	Report	Mackie 75'	Attendance: 15,021; Referee: Grant Hegley

24 October 2009 Match 14	Plymouth Argyle	1–1	Ipswich Town	Home Park, Plymouth
15:00 BST	Fletcher 22'	Report	Stead 68'	Attendance: 10,875; Referee: Simon Hooper

31 October 2009 Match 15	Middlesbrough	0–1	Plymouth Argyle	Riverside Stadium, Middlesbrough
15:00 GMT		Report	Mackie 64'	Attendance: 21,141; Referee: Mick Russell

7 November 2009 Match 16	Plymouth Argyle	2–1	Doncaster Rovers	Home Park, Plymouth
15:00 GMT	Judge 26'; Fallon 71'	Report	Shiels 29'	Attendance: 9,420; Referee: Paul Taylor

21 November 2009 Match 17	Leicester City	1–0	Plymouth Argyle	Walkers Stadium, Leicester
15:00 GMT	King 90+4'	Report		Attendance: 27,174; Referee: Danny McDermid

5 December 2009 Match 18	Plymouth Argyle	0–1	Sheffield United	Home Park, Plymouth
15:00 GMT		Report	Harper 88'	Attendance: 9,231; Referee: Graham Horwood

8 December 2009 Match 19	Swansea City	1–0	Plymouth Argyle	Liberty Stadium, Swansea
19:45 GMT	Trundle 52'	Report		Attendance: 14,004; Referee: Steve Tanner

12 December 2009 Match 20	Preston North End	2–0	Plymouth Argyle	Deepdale, Preston
15:00 GMT	Chaplow 10'; Wallace 26'	Report		Attendance: 12,231; Referee: Michael Oliver

19 December 2009 Match 21	Plymouth Argyle	0–1	Coventry City	Home Park, Plymouth
15:00 GMT		Report	Eastwood 71'	Attendance: 8,347; Referee: Keith Stroud

26 December 2009 Match 22	Cardiff City	0–1	Plymouth Argyle	Cardiff City Stadium, Cardiff
13:00 GMT		Report	Sawyer 84'	Attendance: 24,010; Referee: Phil Gibbs

28 December 2009 Match 23	Plymouth Argyle	4–1	Reading	Home Park, Plymouth
15:00 GMT	Judge 13' (pen.), 63'; Árnason 59'; Barnes 84'	Report	Sigurðsson 62'	Attendance: 12,091; Referee: Simon Hooper

16 January 2010 Match 24	Plymouth Argyle	0–1	Crystal Palace	Home Park, Plymouth
15:00 GMT		Report	Moses 17'	Attendance: 9,318; Referee: Anthony Bates

26 January 2010 Match 25	Plymouth Argyle	1–0	Derby County	Home Park, Plymouth
19:45 GMT	Mackie 82'	Report		Attendance: 7,996; Referee: Andy Hall

30 January 2010 Match 26	Sheffield Wednesday	2–1	Plymouth Argyle	Hillsborough, Sheffield
15:00 GMT	Varney 24', 41'	Report	Fallon 23'	Attendance: 22,590; Referee: Kevin Wright

6 February 2010 Match 27	Plymouth Argyle	0–1	West Bromwich Albion	Home Park, Plymouth
15:00 GMT		Report	Cox 66'	Attendance: 12,053; Referee: Steve Tanner

9 February 2010 Match 28	Reading	2–1	Plymouth Argyle	Madejski Stadium, Reading
20:00 GMT	Long 51', 90+4' (pen.)	Report	Fletcher 68'	Attendance: 15,484; Referee: Oliver Langford

13 February 2010 Match 29	Barnsley	1–3	Plymouth Argyle	Oakwell, Barnsley
15:00 GMT	Colace 45'	Report	Fletcher 64'; Mackie 74'; Fallon 84'	Attendance: 11,661; Referee: Karl Evans

16 February 2010 Match 30	Plymouth Argyle	1–1	Swansea City	Home Park, Plymouth
19:45 GMT	D. Johnson 87'	Report	Pratley 46'	Attendance: 9,185; Referee: Keith Hill

20 February 2010 Match 31	Plymouth Argyle	1–1	Leicester City	Home Park, Plymouth
15:00 GMT	Noone 39'	Report	Árnason 32' (o.g.)	Attendance: 11,581; Referee: Roger East

27 February 2010 Match 32	Sheffield United	4–3	Plymouth Argyle	Bramall Lane, Sheffield
15:00 GMT	Camara 7'; Ward 35', 47'; Cresswell 80'	Report	Bolasie 48'; Mason 56'; Mackie 85'	Attendance: 24,886; Referee: Chris Sarginson

6 March 2010 Match 33	Plymouth Argyle	1–1	Preston North End	Home Park, Plymouth
15:00 GMT	D. Johnson 71' (pen.)	Report	St Ledger 18'	Attendance: 9,582; Referee: Andy Woolmer

9 March 2010 Match 34	Queens Park Rangers	2–0	Plymouth Argyle	Loftus Road, London
20:00 GMT	Taarabt 36' (pen.); Stewart 49'	Report		Attendance: 12,013; Referee: Paul Tierney

13 March 2010 Match 35	Coventry City	1–1	Plymouth Argyle	Ricoh Arena, Coventry
15:00 GMT	McIndoe 49'	Report	Árnason 45+1'	Attendance: 18,127; Referee: Andy Haines

16 March 2010 Match 36	Plymouth Argyle	3–2	Bristol City	Home Park, Plymouth
19:45 GMT	Clark 31'; Wright-Phillips 45'; Fletcher 90+1'	Report	Maynard 58', 78'	Attendance: 9,289; Referee: Trevor Kettle

20 March 2010 Match 37	Scunthorpe United	2–1	Plymouth Argyle	Glanford Park, Scunthorpe
15:00 GMT	Thompson 33'; Woolford 65'	Report	Mackie 28'	Attendance: 5,153; Referee: Anthony Taylor

23 March 2010 Match 38	Ipswich Town	0–2	Plymouth Argyle	Portman Road, Ipswich
19:45 GMT		Report	Wright-Phillips 34'; Mason 78'	Attendance: 19,316; Referee: Dean Whitestone

27 March 2010 Match 39	Plymouth Argyle	0–2	Blackpool	Home Park, Plymouth
15:00 GMT		Report	Adam 78'; Dobbie 82'	Attendance: 10,614; Referee: James Linington

30 March 2010 Match 40	Plymouth Argyle	0–0	Barnsley	Home Park, Plymouth
19:45 BST		Report		Attendance: 7,243; Referee: Mick Russell

3 April 2010 Match 41	Doncaster Rovers	1–2	Plymouth Argyle	Keepmoat Stadium, Doncaster
15:00 BST	Coppinger 58'	Report	Mason 67'; Wright-Phillips 90+1'	Attendance: 10,179; Referee: Kevin Wright

5 April 2010 Match 42	Plymouth Argyle	0–2	Middlesbrough	Home Park, Plymouth
15:00 BST		Report	McManus 22'; Franks 90+4'	Attendance: 11,770; Referee: Scott Mathieson

10 April 2010 Match 43	Watford	1–0	Plymouth Argyle	Vicarage Road, Watford
15:00 BST	Helguson 50'	Report		Attendance: 14,246; Referee: Warren Atkins

19 April 2010 Match 44	Plymouth Argyle	0–2	Newcastle United	Home Park, Plymouth
19:45 BST		Report	Carroll 20'; Routledge 28'	Attendance: 13,111; Referee: Craig Pawson

24 April 2010 Match 45	Nottingham Forest	3–0	Plymouth Argyle	City Ground, Nottingham
15:00 BST	Earnshaw 19'; N'Gala 34' (o.g.); Anderson 90+3'	Report		Attendance: 22,602; Referee: Neil Swarbrick

2 May 2010 Match 46	Plymouth Argyle	1–2	Peterborough United	Home Park, Plymouth
13:00 BST	Wright-Phillips 31'	Report	Mackail-Smith 63', 69'	Attendance: 8,557; Referee: Steve Tanner

Colours: Green = Plymouth Argyle win; Yellow = draw; Red = opponents win.

=== Statistics ===
==== Standings ====
Pos	Team	Pld	W	D	L	GF	GA	GD	Pts
20	Scunthorpe United	46	14	10	22	62	84	−22	52
21	Crystal Palace	46	14	17	15	50	53	−3	49
22	Sheffield Wednesday	46	11	14	21	49	69	−20	47
23	Plymouth Argyle	46	11	8	27	43	68	−25	41
24	Peterborough United	46	8	10	28	46	80	−34	34

Pld = Matches played; W = Matches won; D = Matches drawn; L = Matches lost; GF = Goals for; GA = Goals against; GD = Goal difference; Pts = Points

==== Results summary ====
Overall								Home						Away					
Pld	W	D	L	GF	GA	GD	Pts	W	D	L	GF	GA	GD	W	D	L	GF	GA	GD
46	11	8	27	43	68	−25	41	5	6	12	20	30	−10	6	2	15	23	38	−15

Pld = Matches played; W = Matches won; D = Matches drawn; L = Matches lost; GF = Goals for; GA = Goals against; GD = Goal difference

==== Results by round ====
Round	1	2	3	4	5	6	7	8	9	10	11	12	13	14	15	16	17	18	19	20	21	22	23	24	25	26	27	28	29	30	31	32	33	34	35	36	37	38	39	40	41	42	43	44	45	46
Ground	A	H	H	A	H	A	H	A	H	A	H	A	A	H	A	H	A	H	A	A	H	A	H	H	H	A	H	A	A	H	H	A	H	A	A	H	A	A	H	H	A	H	A	H	A	H
Result	D	D	L	L	L	L	L	L	L	W	W	L	L	D	W	W	L	L	L	L	L	W	W	L	W	L	L	L	W	D	D	L	D	L	D	W	L	W	L	D	W	L	L	L	L	L
Position	12	15	18	19	21	22	24	24	24	23	22	23	23	23	22	21	22	23	23	23	24	23	22	23	22	23	23	23	23	23	23	23	23	23	23	23	23	23	23	23	23	23	23	23	23	23

Updated to match(es) played on 2 May 2010. Source: Statto
A = Away; H = Home; W = Win; D = Draw; L = Loss

== FA Cup ==
=== Summary ===
The third round draw for the FA Cup paired Argyle with Newcastle United, which left assistant manager John Carver with mixed emotions. Neither side could break the deadlock in a competitive contest at Home Park. Argyle striker Rory Fallon forced a good save from Tim Krul before the visitors had chances of their own, the majority of which went to Fabrice Pancrate. Newcastle looked likely to win the game late on but were denied by goalkeeper Romain Larrieu, who tipped a looping volley from Nicky Butt over the crossbar. The match saw the return of Chris Barker to the Argyle defence after a lengthy spell on the sidelines because of injury, and manager Paul Mariner was full of praise for his performance. "For him to come and do what he did against such a high powered, attacking team as Newcastle and playing 90 plus minutes was pretty remarkable. He's a very strong character and very experienced." The replay at St James' Park was Argyle's next match due to the wintry weather, and they were on the wrong end of a 3–0 scoreline. Newcastle striker Peter Løvenkrands gave the home side a two-goal lead at half-time and completed his hat-trick after 72 minutes. "His timing of his runs is pretty special and for the first goal, his finish was fantastic," said Mariner. The match on Tyneside was to be the last in an Argyle shirt for Cillian Sheridan who returned to Celtic in Scotland the next day when his loan spell with the club finished, having made 13 appearances, scoring no goals.

=== Results ===
2 January 2010 Third round	Plymouth Argyle	0–0	Newcastle United	Home Park, Plymouth
15:00 GMT		Report		Attendance: 16,451; Referee: Alan Wiley

13 January 2010 Third round	Newcastle United	3–0	Plymouth Argyle	St James' Park, Newcastle
19:45 GMT	Løvenkrands 10', 40', 72'	Report		Attendance: 15,805; Referee: Andy D'Urso

Colours: Green = Plymouth Argyle win; Yellow = draw; Red = opponents win.

== League Cup ==
=== Summary ===
Having been drawn to face Gillingham in the first round of the League Cup, the club's manager, Paul Sturrock, planned to make a couple of changes to the team that faced Crystal Palace on the opening day of the new season, with youngster Joe Mason included in the squad. Two first-half goals were enough to take the hosts into the second round. Simeon Jackson put Gillingham ahead after 42 minutes and Andy Barcham scored a second just before the half-time break. Argyle reduced the deficit four minutes into the second-half when Luke Summerfield from a direct free kick, but they couldn't find an equaliser. The visitors should have forced extra time but Jamie Mackie spurned a chance when he pulled his shot wide with only the goalkeeper to beat. The defeat extended Sturrock's unfortunate run in the League Cup as a manager, having won just once in nine attempts. "I must have the worst record of all managers in cup competitions, it's unbelievable," he said. "One or two of my defenders didn't defend properly tonight. It's not proper to name people but there were some glaring attempts to clear the ball and that's where we had problems."

=== Results ===
11 August 2009 First round	Gillingham	2–1	Plymouth Argyle	Priestfield, Gillingham
19:45 BST	Jackson 41'; Barcham 45'	Report	Summerfield 50'	Attendance: 3,306; Referee: Jarnail Singh

Colours: Green = Plymouth Argyle win; Yellow = draw; Red = opponents win.

== Pre-season ==
=== Summary ===
Pre-season for Plymouth Argyle began on 1 July 2009 when the first team squad returned to Harpers Park. A week of intense training followed, before the club's first match of the new season took place on 13 July 2009 against Cornish side Truro City. In a match which featured trialist Kári Árnason, Argyle scored a goal in each half to earn a comfortable win. A youthful Argyle team headed across the city of Plymouth the next day to take on Plymouth Parkway. The visitors fell behind to an early goal but responded with three of their own in an entertaining friendly, including a brace from Republic of Ireland youth international Joe Mason. The first team were in action again the next day, against Torquay United. The visitors went behind twice but looked like leaving Plainmoor with a win until Torquay converted a penalty in the 90th minute. The squad then departed for a tour of Scotland, and stopped off in the north of England on the way in order to play a friendly against Skelmersdale United on 18 July 2009. Argyle came away with a 2–0 win after scoring a goal in each half. A picturesque setting greeted the squad as they took to the field against Livingston on 20 July 2009. An 81st-minute penalty from Luke Summerfield wasn't enough to save Argyle from their first defeat of the season.

Hungarian international Zoltán Szélesi joined the squad in training ahead of their next match against Romanian champions Unirea Urziceni. They came from behind to record a 2–1 win in a feisty encounter, with Steve MacLean scoring the decisive goal. Argyle returned to England to play against Morecambe on 25 July 2009, and included a triallist called Réda Johnson in their defence, who appeared in the match under a pseudonym. Two second half goals ensured that they left Christie Park with a win. The club's only pre-season friendly to take place at Home Park was against Scottish club Heart of Midlothian on 29 July 2009. Neither side could break the deadlock in a dour 0–0 draw. Swindon Town were the opposition for Argyle's penultimate friendly. A goal from Marcel Seip after 57 minutes set the visitors on their way to a 2–0 victory at manager Paul Sturrock's old club. Argyle's final pre-season match took place on 3 August 2009 against Tiverton Town. A young team containing only two senior professionals, Yoann Folly and Simon Walton, secured a 1–0 win at Ladysmead.

=== Results ===
13 July 2009 Friendly	Truro City	0–2	Plymouth Argyle	Treyew Road, Truro
19:30 BST		Report	Puncheon 25'; Barnes 60'

14 July 2009 Friendly	Plymouth Parkway	1–3	Plymouth Argyle	Bolitho Park, Plymouth
19:45 BST	Sergent 2'	Report	Mason 22' (pen.), 60'; Rickard 54'

15 July 2009 Friendly	Torquay United	3–3	Plymouth Argyle	Plainmoor, Torquay
19:45 BST	Sills 32'; Seip 54' (o.g.); Benyon 90' (pen.)	Report	Fallon 45'; Sawyer 81'; Summerfield 89' (pen.)	Attendance: 2,046; Referee: Roger East

18 July 2009 Friendly	Skelmersdale United	0–2	Plymouth Argyle	College Stadium, Skelmersdale
15:00 BST		Report	Fallon 18'; Paterson 79'

20 July 2009 Tour of Scotland	Livingston	2–1	Plymouth Argyle	Creamery Park, Bathgate
19:30 BST	Timár 25' (o.g.); McParland 49'	Report	Summerfield 81' (pen.)

22 July 2009 Tour of Scotland	Unirea Urziceni	1–2	Plymouth Argyle	Kelvinside Academy, Glasgow
19:00 BST	Rusescu 34'	Report	Fallon 64'; MacLean 67'

25 July 2009 Friendly	Morecambe	0–2	Plymouth Argyle	Christie Park, Morecambe
15:00 BST		Report	Sawyer 55'; Paterson 77'	Attendance: 705; Referee: Nigel Miller

29 July 2009 Friendly	Plymouth Argyle	0–0	Heart of Midlothian	Home Park, Plymouth
19:45 BST		Report		Attendance: 4,177; Referee: Keith Stroud

1 August 2009 Friendly	Swindon Town	0–2	Plymouth Argyle	County Ground, Swindon
15:00 BST		Report	Seip 57'; Lucas 84' (o.g.)	Attendance: 2,064; Referee: John Farries

3 August 2009 Friendly	Tiverton Town	0–1	Plymouth Argyle	Ladysmead, Tiverton
19:45 BST		Report	Head 28'

Colours: Green = Plymouth Argyle win; Yellow = draw; Red = opponents win.

== Squad ==
=== Players ===
Note: Flags indicate national team as defined under FIFA eligibility rules; some limited exceptions apply. Players may hold more than one non-FIFA nationality.

No.	Pos.	Nation	Player
1	GK	FRA	Romain Larrieu
2	DF	ENG	Karl Duguid
3	MF	SCO	Jim Paterson
4	MF	WAL	Carl Fletcher
5	DF	HUN	Krisztián Timár
6	MF	SCO	Chris Clark
7	MF	NIR	Damien Johnson
8	FW	ENG	Jamie Mackie
9	FW	SCO	Steve MacLean
10	FW	ENG	Bradley Wright-Phillips
11	DF	ISL	Kári Árnason
13	DF	WAL	Darcy Blake
14	FW	NZL	Rory Fallon
15	DF	ENG	Chris Barker
16	DF	SCO	David McNamee
17	MF	ENG	Craig Noone
18	DF	ENG	Gary Sawyer
19	DF	NED	Marcel Seip

No.	Pos.	Nation	Player
20	MF	ENG	Luke Summerfield
21	FW	IRL	Cillian Sheridan
21	GK	ENG	David Stockdale
22	DF	BEN	Réda Johnson
23	DF	ENG	Richard Eckersley
24	FW	AUT	Ashley Barnes
25	MF	IRL	Alan Judge
26	FW	SCO	Alan Gow
29	DF	ENG	Bondz N'Gala
31	MF	TOG	Yoann Folly
32	FW	IRL	Joe Mason
33	FW	USA	Kenny Cooper
35	DF	ZIM	Onismor Bhasera
36	MF	COD	Yannick Bolasie
37	DF	AUS	Shane Lowry
38	DF	ENG	James Chester
39	DF	SCO	David Gray
40	DF	ENG	Ryan Leonard

=== Statistics ===
No.	Pos.	Name	Apps	Goals	Apps	Goals	Apps	Goals	Apps	Goals
No.	Pos.	Name	League		FA Cup		League Cup		Total	
1	GK	(France) Romain Larrieu	25	0	2	0	1	0	28	0
2	DF	(England) Karl Duguid	42	1	2	0	1	0	45	1
3	DF	(Scotland) Jim Paterson	12	0	0	0	1	0	13	0
4	MF	(Wales) Carl Fletcher	41	4	2	0	0	0	43	4
5	DF	(Hungary) Krisztián Timár	7	1	0	0	0	0	7	1
6	MF	(Scotland) Chris Clark	37	1	2	0	1	0	40	1
7	MF	(Northern Ireland) Damien Johnson	20	2	0	0	0	0	20	2
8	FW	(England) Jamie Mackie	42	8	1	0	1	0	44	8
9	FW	(Scotland) Steve MacLean	3	0	0	0	1	0	4	0
10	FW	(England) Bradley Wright-Phillips	15	4	1	0	0	0	16	4
11	DF	(Iceland) Kári Árnason	32	2	2	0	0	0	34	2
13	DF	(Wales) Darcy Blake	7	0	0	0	0	0	7	0
14	FW	(New Zealand) Rory Fallon	33	5	2	0	1	0	36	5
15	DF	(England) Chris Barker	14	0	2	0	0	0	16	0
16	DF	(Scotland) David McNamee	9	0	2	0	1	0	12	0
17	MF	(England) Craig Noone	17	1	1	0	1	0	19	1
18	DF	(England) Gary Sawyer	29	1	2	0	1	0	32	1
19	DF	(Netherlands) Marcel Seip	5	0	0	0	1	0	6	0
20	MF	(England) Luke Summerfield	12	0	2	0	1	1	15	1
21	FW	(Republic of Ireland) Cillian Sheridan	13	0	1	0	0	0	14	0
21	GK	(England) David Stockdale	21	0	0	0	0	0	21	0
22	DF	(Benin) Réda Johnson	25	0	0	0	0	0	25	0
23	DF	(England) Richard Eckersley	7	0	0	0	0	0	7	0
24	FW	(Austria) Ashley Barnes	7	1	1	0	1	0	9	1
25	MF	(Republic of Ireland) Alan Judge	37	5	2	0	1	0	40	5
26	FW	(Scotland) Alan Gow	14	2	0	0	0	0	14	2
29	DF	(England) Bondz N'Gala	9	0	0	0	0	0	9	0
31	MF	(Togo) Yoann Folly	7	0	0	0	0	0	7	0
32	FW	(Republic of Ireland) Joe Mason	19	3	0	0	0	0	19	3
33	FW	(United States) Kenny Cooper	7	0	0	0	0	0	7	0
35	DF	(Zimbabwe) Onismor Bhasera	7	0	0	0	0	0	7	0
36	MF	(Democratic Republic of the Congo) Yannick Bolasie	16	1	0	0	0	0	16	1
37	DF	(Australia) Shane Lowry	13	0	0	0	0	0	13	0
38	DF	(England) James Chester	3	0	0	0	0	0	3	0
39	DF	(Scotland) David Gray	12	0	0	0	0	0	12	0
40	DF	(England) Ryan Leonard	1	0	0	0	0	0	1	0

=== Discipline ===
No.	Pos.	Name	Yellow card	Red card	Yellow card	Red card	Yellow card	Red card	Yellow card	Red card
No.	Pos.	Name	League		FA Cup		League Cup		Total	
1	GK	(France) Romain Larrieu	1	0	0	0	0	0	1	0
2	DF	(England) Karl Duguid	4	0	1	0	0	0	5	0
3	DF	(Scotland) Jim Paterson	1	0	0	0	0	0	1	0
4	MF	(Wales) Carl Fletcher	9	0	0	0	0	0	9	0
5	DF	(Hungary) Krisztián Timár	3	0	0	0	0	0	3	0
6	MF	(Scotland) Chris Clark	2	0	0	0	0	0	2	0
7	MF	(Northern Ireland) Damien Johnson	2	0	0	0	0	0	2	0
8	FW	(England) Jamie Mackie	8	0	0	0	1	0	9	0
10	FW	(England) Bradley Wright-Phillips	3	0	0	0	0	0	3	0
11	DF	(Iceland) Kári Árnason	7	0	1	0	0	0	8	0
13	DF	(Wales) Darcy Blake	1	1	0	0	0	0	1	1
14	FW	(New Zealand) Rory Fallon	5	0	1	0	1	0	7	0
15	DF	(England) Chris Barker	1	0	0	0	0	0	1	0
16	DF	(Scotland) David McNamee	1	0	0	0	0	0	1	0
17	MF	(England) Craig Noone	1	0	0	0	0	0	1	0
18	DF	(England) Gary Sawyer	7	0	0	0	1	0	8	0
19	DF	(Netherlands) Marcel Seip	1	0	0	0	1	0	2	0
20	MF	(England) Luke Summerfield	1	0	0	0	0	0	1	0
21	GK	(England) David Stockdale	1	0	0	0	0	0	1	0
22	DF	(Benin) Réda Johnson	8	0	0	0	0	0	8	0
23	DF	(England) Richard Eckersley	2	0	0	0	0	0	2	0
25	MF	(Republic of Ireland) Alan Judge	2	0	0	0	0	0	2	0
26	FW	(Scotland) Alan Gow	1	0	0	0	0	0	1	0
36	MF	(Democratic Republic of the Congo) Yannick Bolasie	2	0	0	0	0	0	2	0
37	DF	(Australia) Shane Lowry	3	1	0	0	0	0	3	1
39	DF	(Scotland) David Gray	4	0	0	0	0	0	4	0

=== Awards ===
Name	Player	Notes
Player of the Year	(Wales) Carl Fletcher	
Young Player of the Year	(Republic of Ireland) Joe Mason	

== Transfers ==
=== Permanent ===
==== In ====
Date	Pos.	Name	From	Fee	Notes
9 June 2009	MF	Carl Fletcher	Crystal Palace	Free transfer	
15 July 2009	FW	Bradley Wright-Phillips	Southampton	Free transfer	
20 July 2009	MF	Kári Árnason	AGF Aarhus	Free transfer	
29 July 2009	DF	Réda Johnson	Amiens	Undisclosed	
7 August 2009	GK	Kyle Letheren	Barnsley	Free transfer	
14 August 2009	FW	Alan Gow	Rangers	Undisclosed	
1 February 2010	MF	Damien Johnson	Birmingham City	Free transfer	
29 March 2010	DF	Onismor Bhasera	Kaizer Chiefs	Free transfer	

==== Out ====
Date	Pos.	Name	To	Fee	Notes
30 June 2009	FW	Émile Mpenza	FC Sion	Free transfer	
14 July 2009	FW	Jermaine Easter	Milton Keynes Dons	Undisclosed	
23 July 2009	GK	Graham Stack	Hibernian	Free transfer	
6 August 2009	DF	Mathias Kouo-Doumbé	Milton Keynes Dons	Free transfer	
31 December 2009	DF	Ryan Brett	Plymouth Parkway	Free transfer	
31 December 2009	DF	Ben Gerring	Truro City	Free transfer	
31 December 2009	GK	Kyle Letheren	Motherwell	Free transfer	
30 January 2010	MF	Jason Puncheon	Southampton	Undisclosed	
1 February 2010	DF	Damien McCrory	Dagenham & Redbridge	Undisclosed	

=== Loan signings ===
==== In ====
Date	Pos.	Name	From	Duration	Notes
4 August 2009	MF	Alan Judge	Blackburn Rovers	End of season	
13 August 2009	FW	Cillian Sheridan	Celtic	Six months	
28 August 2009	DF	Darcy Blake	Cardiff City	Four months	
17 September 2009	DF	Shane Lowry	Aston Villa	Three months	
18 September 2009	DF	James Chester	Manchester United	Three months	
18 September 2009	DF	David Gray	Manchester United	Three months	
22 January 2010	GK	David Stockdale	Fulham	Three months	
1 February 2010	FW	Kenny Cooper	1860 Munich	End of season	
5 March 2010	DF	Richard Eckersley	Burnley	End of season	
16 March 2010	DF	Bondz N'Gala	West Ham United	End of season	

==== Out ====
Date	Pos.	Name	To	Duration	Notes
9 July 2009	MF	Yannick Bolasie	Barnet	Six months	
4 August 2009	MF	Jason Puncheon	Milton Keynes Dons	Six months	
24 August 2009	DF	Damien McCrory	Port Vale	One month	
28 August 2009	FW	George Donnelly	Luton Town	One month	
31 August 2009	MF	Simon Walton	Crewe Alexandra	End of season	
10 September 2009	MF	Craig Noone	Exeter City	Three months	
25 September 2009	MF	Luke Summerfield	Leyton Orient	Three months	
29 September 2009	DF	Marcel Seip	Blackpool	Three months	
9 November 2009	DF	Damien McCrory	Grimsby Town	One month	
1 January 2010	DF	Marcel Seip	Sheffield United	End of season	
1 January 2010	DF	Krisztián Timár	Oldham Athletic	One month	
29 January 2010	FW	George Donnelly	Stockport County	End of season	
1 February 2010	FW	Steve MacLean	Aberdeen	End of season	
1 February 2010	FW	Alan Gow	Hibernian	End of season	
1 February 2010	MF	Jim Paterson	Aberdeen	End of season	
9 February 2010	FW	Ashley Barnes	Torquay United	One month	
24 February 2010	MF	Yoann Folly	Dagenham & Redbridge	One month	
16 March 2010	FW	Liam Head	Tiverton Town	End of season	
25 March 2010	FW	Ashley Barnes	Brighton & Hove Albion	End of season	
25 March 2010	DF	Gary Sawyer	Bristol City	End of season	

== See also ==
- List of Plymouth Argyle F.C. seasons
