= Myles Anderson =

English footballer

Personal information
- Full name: Myles Anderson
- Date of birth: 9 January 1990 (age 36)
- Place of birth: Westminster, England
- Height: 6 ft 0 in (1.83 m)
- Position: Defender

Team information
- Current team: Heybridge Swifts

Youth career
- 2010–2011: Leyton Orient

Senior career*
Years	Team	Apps	(Gls)
2011	Aberdeen	1	(0)
2011–2013	Blackburn Rovers	0	(0)
2012	→ Aldershot Town (loan)	5	(0)
2013	Exeter City	1	(0)
2013–2015	Monza	8	(0)
2014	→ Pro Patria (loan)	15	(1)
2015	Chievo	0	(0)
2015–2016	L'Aquila	9	(0)
2016	→ Lupa Castelli Romani (loan)	4	(0)
2016–2017	Barrow	0	(0)
2017–2018	Torquay United	23	(1)
2017–2018	→ Chester (loan)	2	(0)
2018	Chester	12	(0)
2018–2020	Hartlepool United	40	(0)
2019–2020	→ Aldershot Town (loan)	3	(0)
2020–2021	Weymouth	2	(0)
2020	→ Hampton & Richmond Borough (loan)	8	(0)
2021	Hampton & Richmond Borough	2	(0)
2021–2022	Braintree Town	10	(1)
2022–2023	Beaconsfield Town	8	(0)
2023–2024	Heybridge Swifts	39	(2)
2024–2025	Rayners Lane	24	(2)
2024	→ Northwood (dual-registration)	1	(0)
2025–	Heybridge Swifts	11	(1)
- * Club domestic league appearances and goals as of 01:08, 22 May 2026 (UTC)

Myles Anderson (born 9 January 1990) is an English professional footballer who plays as a defender for Heybridge Swifts. Anderson has been at several clubs in his career, having played in Scotland, England and Italy.

== Early and personal life ==
Born in Westminster, Anderson is the son of football agent Jerome Anderson.

== Career ==
Anderson moved from his youth club of Leyton Orient to Aberdeen in January 2011. He made his professional debut on 19 February 2011, in a Scottish Premier League match against Kilmarnock. In March 2011, Anderson signed a pre-contract with Blackburn Rovers, effective from 1 July 2011.

Anderson joined Aldershot Town on loan in August 2012. He left Blackburn on 4 January 2013 after having his contract terminated by mutual consent. He signed for Exeter City three days later. Anderson's time at Exeter was also short, and on 20 August 2013, he signed for Italian club Monza. After a season at Monza, Anderson joined Lega Pro side Pro Patria on loan in August 2014. After six months on loan at Pro Patria, on 1 February 2015 he Anderson moved to Serie A side Chievo. On 21 July 2015, Anderson returned to Lega Pro, leaving Chievo for L'Aquila. On 29 January 2016, Anderson joined fellow Lega Pro side Lupa Castelli Romani on loan for the remainder of the season. By the time he left Italy after three years in the country, Anderson considered himself fluent in the language.

Anderson signed for Barrow in October 2016, before moving to Torquay United in February 2017. He signed a new contract with Torquay in June 2017.

He signed on loan from Chester in November 2017. After his contract with Torquay was mutual terminated on 5 February 2018, he signed a permanent deal with Chester three days later.

After leaving Chester, he signed for Hartlepool United in May 2018. Anderson signed a new deal with Hartlepool in May 2019 with Pools boss Craig Hignett describing him as a "model professional". Anderson signed for Aldershot Town on loan on 25 November 2019. Anderson was released from his contract at the end of the 2019–20 season.

On 31 August 2020, Anderson joined newly-promoted National League side Weymouth after leaving Hartlepool United. He joined Hampton & Richmond Borough on loan on 30 October 2020. He left Weymouth at the end of the 2020–21 season having made just two appearances. Following a successful loan spell, Anderson joined Hampton & Richmond Borough on a permanent deal in July 2021.

Following his departure from Hampton & Richmond, Anderson joined Braintree Town ahead of their league tie against Hungerford Town, which eventually resulted in a 2–0 defeat for the Iron.

In November 2022, Anderson signed for Beaconsfield Town, making his debut against Aylesbury Vale Dynamos.

In March 2023, Anderson signed for Heybridge Swifts. He returned to the club in May 2025, following a season with Rayners Lane. Anderson had also played one game for Northwood in August 2024.

== Career statistics ==
As of 17 January 2026

Appearances and goals by club, season and competition
Club	Season	League			National Cup		League Cup		Other		Total	
Club	Season	Division	Apps	Goals	Apps	Goals	Apps	Goals	Apps	Goals	Apps	Goals
Aberdeen	2010–11	Scottish Premier League	1	0	0	0	0	0	—		1	0
Blackburn Rovers	2011–12	Premier League	0	0	0	0	0	0	0	0	0	0
Blackburn Rovers	2012–13	Championship	0	0	0	0	0	0	0	0	0	0
Blackburn Rovers	Total		0	0	0	0	0	0	0	0	0	0
Aldershot Town (loan)	2012–13	League Two	5	0	0	0	0	0	2 (Note: Appearance(s) in the Football League Trophy.)	0	7	0
Exeter City	2012–13	League Two	1	0	0	0	0	0	0	0	1	0
Monza	2013–14	Lega Pro 2	8	0	0	0	—		0	0	8	0
Monza	2014–15	Lega Pro - Group A	0	0	0	0	—		0	0	0	0
Monza	Total		8	0	0	0	0	0	0	0	8	0
Pro Patria (loan)	2014–15	Lega Pro - Group A	15	1	0	0	—		0	0	15	1
Chievo	2014–15	Serie A	0	0	0	0	—		0	0	0	0
L'Aquila	2015–16	Lega Pro - Group B	9	0	2	0	—		0	0	11	0
Lupa Castelli Romani (loan)	2015–16	Lega Pro - Group C	4	0	0	0	—		0	0	4	0
Barrow	2016–17	National League	0	0	1	0	—		0	0	1	0
Torquay United	2016–17	National League	14	1	0	0	—		0	0	14	1
Torquay United	2017–18	National League	9	0	0	0	—		0	0	9	0
Torquay United	Total		23	1	0	0	0	0	0	0	23	1
Chester (loan)	2017–18	National League	2	0	0	0	—		1 (Note: Appearance(s) in the FA Trophy.)	0	3	0
Chester	2017–18	National League	12	0	0	0	—		0	0	12	0
Hartlepool United	2018–19	National League	36	0	2	0	—		1	1	39	1
Hartlepool United	2019–20	National League	4	0	0	0	—		0	0	4	0
Hartlepool United	Total		40	0	2	0	0	0	1	1	43	1
Aldershot Town (loan)	2019–20	National League	3	0	0	0	—		1	0	4	0
Weymouth	2020–21	National League	2	0	1	0	—		0	0	3	0
Hampton & Richmond Borough (loan)	2020–21	National League South	8	0	0	0	—		0	0	8	0
Hampton & Richmond Borough	2021–22	National League South	2	0	0	0	—		0	0	2	0
Braintree Town	2021–22	National League South	6	1	0	0	—		0	0	6	1
Braintree Town	2022–23	National League South	4	0	0	0	—		0	0	4	0
Braintree Town	Total		10	1	0	0	—		0	0	10	1
Beaconsfield Town	2022–23	Southern League Premier Division South	8	0	0	0	—		1	1	9	1
Heybridge Swifts	2022–23	Isthmian League North Division	6	1	0	0	—		2	0	6	1
Heybridge Swifts	2023–24	Isthmian League North Division	33	1	2	0	—		3	1	38	2
Heybridge Swifts	Total		39	2	2	0	—		5	1	44	3
Rayners Lane	2024–25	Isthmian League South Central Division	24	2	2	0	—		2 (Note: Appearance(s) in Middlesex Senior Cup)	0	28	2
Northwood (dual-registration)	2024–25	Isthmian League South Central Division	1	0	0	0	—		0	0	1	0
Heybridge Swifts	2025–26	Isthmian League North Division	11	1	1	0	—		0	0	12	1
Career total			228	8	11	0	0	0	13	3	252	11
