= Rubén Rochina =

Spanish footballer (born 1991)

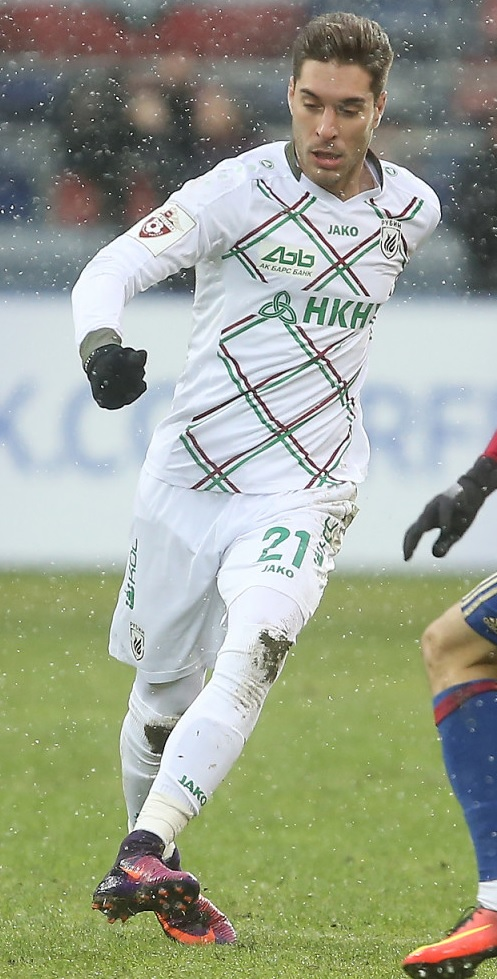
- Rochina with Rubin Kazan in 2016

Personal information
- Full name: Rubén Rochina Naixes
- Date of birth: 23 March 1991 (age 35)
- Place of birth: Sagunto, Spain
- Height: 1.82 m (6 ft 0 in)
- Positions: Winger; forward

Youth career
- 2003–2004: Valencia
- 2004–2010: Barcelona

Senior career*
Years	Team	Apps	(Gls)
2008–2011	Barcelona B	26	(4)
2011–2014	Blackburn Rovers	46	(7)
2013	→ Zaragoza (loan)	15	(1)
2014	→ Rayo Vallecano (loan)	17	(3)
2014–2016	Granada	54	(8)
2016–2018	Rubin Kazan	27	(2)
2018	→ Levante (loan)	5	(1)
2018–2021	Levante	80	(8)
2021–2023	Granada	23	(1)
2024	Atlético Baleares	11	(1)
Total		304	(36)

International career
2008	Spain U17	7	(4)
2009	Spain U18	1	(0)
2010	Spain U19	9	(4)
Medal record
Men's football
Representing Spain
UEFA European Under-17 Championship
Winner	2008 Turkey
- * Club domestic league appearances and goals

Rubén Rochina Naixes (born 23 March 1991) is a Spanish former professional footballer who played as a winger or a forward.

He began his professional career with Barcelona B before joining Blackburn Rovers in 2011, spending three years at the club and serving loan spells at Zaragoza and Rayo Vallecano during his contract. He also played in Russia with Rubin Kazan.

== Club career ==
=== Barcelona ===
Born in Sagunto, Valencian Community, Rochina arrived at FC Barcelona's youth system at the age of 13, after starting his development with local Valencia CF.

Whilst still a junior, he appeared in 13 games for Barcelona's reserves in the Segunda División B, playing three times (117 minutes) in the 2009–10 season as Luis Enrique's side returned to Segunda División after an 11-year absence.

=== Blackburn Rovers ===
On 31 January 2011, without having appeared for Barcelona's first team, Rochina joined Premier League team Blackburn Rovers on a four-year deal. On 11 February, he scored twice for the reserves against Newcastle United's reserves in a 4–4 draw.

On 16 April 2011, Rochina made his league debut for his new club, starting in a 2–0 loss at Everton. On 24 August he scored his first competitive goal for Rovers, just five minutes into the League Cup match against Sheffield Wednesday, and added a second in the 3–1 home win.

Rochina scored his first league goal for Blackburn on 11 September, in a 1–1 away draw to Fulham. In the next game he provided an assist in a 4–3 home victory over Arsenal, and appeared in 18 matches during the campaign as the team was relegated.

On 1 September 2012, Rochina scored a back-heeled goal to equalise six minutes from time in a 3–3 away draw against Leeds United. He spent the second half of the campaign on loan at Real Zaragoza. He made his La Liga debut on 3 February 2013 as a 74th-minute substitute in a 1–1 away draw with Málaga CF, and scored his first goal in the competition on 27 April to help defeat RCD Mallorca 3–2 at La Romareda, as the Aragonese eventually suffered relegation after finishing bottom.

On the opening day of the 2013–14 Championship season, Rochina dislocated his shoulder during the fixture against Derby County. After surgery, he missed the next three months of the campaign, and on 20 January 2014 he returned to the Spanish top flight on loan, this time to Rayo Vallecano. His first appearance came six days later, in a 2–4 home loss to Atlético Madrid in which he played 34 minutes.

=== Granada ===
On 3 August 2014, Rochina signed a four-year deal with Granada CF for an undisclosed fee. He scored two goals in his first year, the second being a 50-meter lob in a 3–0 away win over Real Sociedad.

Rochina netted six times in 2015–16 as Los Nazaríes again avoided relegation, including a late equaliser for a 2–2 draw in the Derby of eastern Andalusia away to Málaga CF on 28 November 2015.

=== Rubin Kazan ===
On 20 July 2016, Rochina moved abroad for a second time when Russian Premier League side FC Rubin Kazan triggered his €10 million release clause and offered to treble his wages – Blackburn were due 15% of the receipt. He returned to his homeland on 31 January 2018, joining Levante UD on loan until the end of the season.

=== Levante ===
Following his loan, Rochina signed a three-year contract with Levante on 4 July 2018. He scored four league goals in each of his first two seasons.

=== Later career ===
Rochina returned to Granada in August 2021, for a €10 million fee. Bothered by several injury problems, he suffered top-tier relegation at the end of 2021–22 but achieved promotion the following campaign, contributing only eight appearances to this feat.

On 8 February 2024, following a trial at FC DAC 1904 Dunajská Streda from Slovakia, the 32-year-old Rochina joined Primera Federación club CD Atlético Baleares.

== International career ==
Rochina was capped for Spain at under-17, under-18 and under-19 levels, for a total of 17 caps and eight goals. With the first of those age groups, he won the 2008 UEFA European Championship in Turkey.

== Career statistics ==
As of match played 14 May 2016

Club	Season	League			National Cup		League Cup		Other		Total	
Club	Season	Division	Apps	Goals	Apps	Goals	Apps	Goals	Apps	Goals	Apps	Goals
Barcelona B	2008–09	Segunda División B	10	2	—		—		—		10	2
Barcelona B	2009–10	Segunda División B	3	0	—		—		—		3	0
Barcelona B	2010–11	Segunda División	13	2	—		—		—		13	2
Barcelona B	Total		26	4	0	0	0	0	0	0	26	4
Blackburn Rovers	2010–11	Premier League	4	0	—		—		—		4	0
Blackburn Rovers	2011–12	Premier League	18	2	1	0	4	4	—		23	6
Blackburn Rovers	2012–13	Championship	19	5	2	0	1	0	—		22	5
Blackburn Rovers	2013–14	Championship	5	0	—		—		—		5	0
Blackburn Rovers	Total		46	7	3	0	5	4	0	0	54	11
Zaragoza	2012–13	La Liga	15	1	—		—		—		15	1
Rayo Vallecano	2013–14	La Liga	17	3	—		—		—		17	3
Granada	2014–15	La Liga	19	2	—		—		—		19	2
Granada	2015–16	La Liga	35	6	3	0	—		—		38	6
Granada	Total		54	8	3	0	0	0	0	0	57	8
Career total			158	23	6	0	5	4	0	0	169	27

== Honours ==
Granada

- Segunda División: 2022–23

Spain U17

- UEFA European Under-17 Championship: 2008

Spain U19

- UEFA European Under-19 Championship runner-up: 2010
