= Filip Pivkovski =

Macedonian footballer

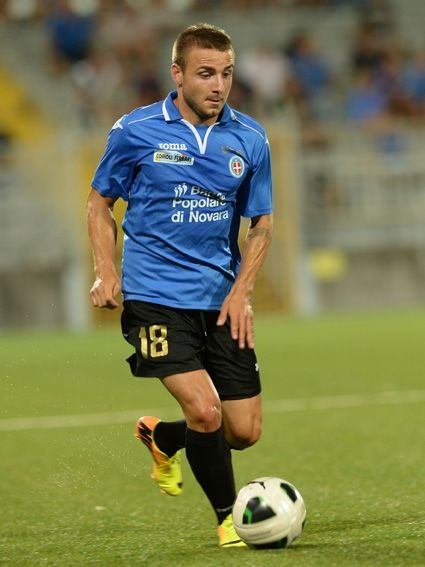
- Filip Pivkovski playing for Novara

Personal information
- Full name: Filip Pivkovski
- Date of birth: 31 January 1994 (age 32)
- Place of birth: Malmö, Sweden
- Height: 1.72 m (5 ft 7 1/2 in)
- Position: Left wing

Team information
- Current team: Ängelholms FF
- Number: 14

Youth career
- 2007–2009: Malmö FF
- 2009–2012: Blackburn Rovers
- 2012: → Nordsjælland (loan)

Senior career*
Years	Team	Apps	(Gls)
2012–2013	Häcken		
2013–2015	Novara	2	(0)
2015	→ Martina Franca (loan)	12	(0)
2016–2018	Landskrona	61	(10)
2019–	Ängelholm	0	(0)

International career
2009–2010	Sweden U16	4	(2)
2010–2011	Sweden U17	15	(6)
2011–2012	Sweden U18	20	(7)
2012–2013	Sweden U19	9	(1)
2014–2017	Macedonia U21	11	(1)
- * Club domestic league appearances and goals as of 12 November 2018

Filip Pivkovski (Macedonian: Филип Пивковски; born 31 January 1994) is a Swedish-born Macedonian footballer who plays as a left winger for Ängelholms FF.

== Club career ==
Filip Pivkovski made his debut for Novara Calcio in Coppa Italia in August 2013 against U.S. Grosseto F.C.

=== Career statistics ===
Season	Club	League	League		Cup		Continental		Total	
Season	Club	League	Apps	Goals	Apps	Goals	Apps	Goals	Apps	Goals
2013–14	Novara Calcio	Serie B	1	0	1	0	—		2	0
Total	Italy		2	0	0	0	0	0	2	0
