= Bruno Ribeiro (Brazilian footballer) =

Brazilian footballer (born 1983)

Personal information
- Full name: Bruno de Paula Ribeiro Ingrácia
- Date of birth: 1 April 1983 (age 43)
- Place of birth: Tupã, Brazil
- Height: 1.72 m (5 ft 8 in)
- Position: Right back

Senior career*
Years	Team	Apps	(Gls)
2002–2007	Marília		
2005	→ Palmeiras (loan)		
2005	→ Figueirense (loan)		
2008	Paulista		
2008	Fortaleza		
2008	Marília		
2009–2011	Grêmio Barueri		
2011–2014	Blackburn Rovers		
2013–2014	→ Linense (loan)		
2015	Treze		
2015	Matonense		
2016–2018	Juventude		
2016	→ Joinville (loan)		
2019	Portuguesa		
2019–2020	Pelotas		
2020	→ Marília (loan)		
- * Club domestic league appearances and goals

Bruno de Paula Ribeiro Ingrácia (born 1 April 1983), known as Bruno Ribeiro, is a Brazilian former footballer who played as a right back.

== Career ==
Bruno started his footballing career with Marília and played for several other Brazilian teams, such as Palmeiras and Grêmio Barueri.

=== Blackburn Rovers ===
On 12 August 2011, Bruno signed for Blackburn Rovers on a three-year deal with an option of a fourth, after being issued with a work permit. During his time at Rovers he was comically nicknamed the 'Brazilian Denis Irwin' by the Rovers players "because he never gives the ball away" according to manager Steve Kean. Ribeiro failed to make a single appearance for Rovers in the 2011/12 Barclays Premier League season as the club was relegated to the championship.

On 22 August 2012, Bruno made his 1st team debut for Blackburn Rovers, against Hull City, coming on as a substitute. On 25 August 2012, Bruno made his first start for Blackburn Rovers, against Leicester City. He also earned the Man of the Match award. On 1 September, Bruno made his third appearance for Blackburn in a 3–3 draw away at Leeds United.

On 8 January 2013, Ribeiro signed for Clube Atlético Linense on a six-month loan until the end of the 2012/13 season.

On 2 January 2014, Ribeiro returned to his homeland to sign for the club where he played on loan for the last six months Clube Atlético Linense on a free transfer.

== Club career statistics ==
Club	Season	League		Cup		Europe		Total	
Club	Season	Apps	Goals	Apps	Goals	Apps	Goals	Apps	Goals
Blackburn Rovers	2012–13	5	0	0	0	0	0	5	0
Blackburn Rovers	Total	5	0	0	0	0	0	5	0
Career Total		5	0	0	0	0	0	5	0
