= David McNamee =

Scottish footballer (born 1980)

Personal information
- Full name: David Kenneth McNamee
- Date of birth: 10 October 1980 (age 46)
- Place of birth: Glasgow, Scotland
- Height: 5 ft 11 in (1.80 m)
- Position: Right back

Senior career*
Years	Team	Apps	(Gls)
1997–1999	St Mirren	24	(0)
1999–2002	Blackburn Rovers	0	(0)
1999	→ St Mirren (loan)	8	(0)
2002–2006	Livingston	85	(4)
2006–2008	Coventry City	29	(0)
2008–2010	Plymouth Argyle	19	(0)
2010–2011	Aberdeen	10	(0)
2012	Ross County	0	(0)
2012–2013	Nuneaton Town	13	(0)
2013–2014	Leamington	10	(0)
Total		198	(4)

International career
2004–2006	Scotland	4	(0)
- * Club domestic league appearances and goals

David Kenneth McNamee (born 10 October 1980) is a Scottish former footballer, who played as a right back. His clubs included St Mirren, Blackburn Rovers, Livingston, Coventry City, Plymouth Argyle, Aberdeen and Ross County. McNamee represented Scotland four times at international level.

== Club career ==
McNamee, a versatile defender, started his career with Scottish club St Mirren. His impressive performances for St Mirren alerted Premier League club Blackburn Rovers, who signed him in 1999. His £300,000 transfer to England, was unsuccessful, however. Having failed to make a single first team appearance for the Ewood Park club, McNamee returned to Scotland in 2002 to join Livingston for an undisclosed fee.

McNamee was a member of the Livingston team which won the 2004 Scottish League Cup Final, against Hibernian at Hampden Park. In 2005–06, his season was blighted by injury and he only featured 15 times for Livingston, who were eventually relegated from the Scottish Premier League.

With Livingston having been relegated from the SPL, and several clubs having confirmed their interest in him, it was unlikely that McNamee would remain at Livingston. On 2 June 2006, he signed for Coventry City of the English Championship, for a fee of £100,000. His time at the Ricoh Arena was blighted by injuries, and although given a chance to prove his worth to the team, manager Chris Coleman decided against offering a new deal. McNamee was released by Coventry on 14 July 2008. The next day, McNamee signed a two-year contract with fellow Championship club Plymouth Argyle, becoming their third signing of the summer. In May 2010, after playing nearly 20 times for Plymouth, McNamee and teammates Yoann Folly and Lloyd Saxton were released.

McNamee started training with Motherwell in November 2010, with a view of signing a permanent deal with the Steelmen. However, following manager Craig Brown's departure to Aberdeen, McNamee looked set to follow him to Pittodrie. McNamee was on his way to Aberdeen to undergo a medical when his plane from Birmingham had to turn back due to heavy snow closing Dyce Airport. McNamee eventually signed for Aberdeen on 24 December, again teaming up with Folly. On 27 April, it was announced that McNamee would not be offered a new contract at Pittodrie and would be released at the end of the season.

McNamee spent six months without a club before joining Ross County in January 2012, signing a contract until the end of the 2011–12 season.

Conference National club Nuneaton Town signed McNamee in October 2012. He left the club in November 2013, and signed for Leamington later that month.

== International career ==
After an impressive season with Livingston, McNamee was handed a Scotland call-up by manager, Berti Vogts for two end-of season friendlies. He won his first cap playing 90 minutes in an exhibition match against Estonia national football team on 27 May 2004. Just three days later, McNamee won his second cap against Trinidad and Tobago national football team.

He went two years without a call-up before he was selected by Walter Smith for his Scotland squads in 2005. After a period of being an unused substitute in matches, he finally won his third cap against Bulgaria in the Kirin Cup where he came on as an 82nd-minute substitute. He won his fourth and so far final cap in the Kirin Cup against the hosts, Japan on 13 May 2006 as an 80th-minute substitute helping Scotland to winning the competition.

== After playing football ==
After retiring from playing football in 2014, McNamee studied for coaching qualifications. He worked for the youth academy of Coventry City, but found that he did not have sufficient enthusiasm for coaching. McNamee then joined the Royal Navy. As of November 2015, he was attending HMS Raleigh to train as a mine warfare specialist.

== Career statistics ==
Appearances and goals by club, season and competition
Club	Season	League			FA Cup		League Cup		Other^{[A]}		Total	
Club	Season	Division	Apps	Goals	Apps	Goals	Apps	Goals	Apps	Goals	Apps	Goals
St Mirren	1997–98	Scottish First Division	1	0	0	0	0	0	0	0	1	0
St Mirren	1998–99	Scottish First Division	23	0	1	0	1	0	0	0	25	0
St Mirren	Total		24	0	1	0	1	0	0	0	26	0
Blackburn Rovers	1998–99	Premier League	0	0	0	0	0	0	0	0	0	0
Blackburn Rovers	1999–2000	First Division	0	0	0	0	0	0	0	0	0	0
Blackburn Rovers	2000–01	First Division	0	0	0	0	0	0	0	0	0	0
Blackburn Rovers	2001–02	Premier League	0	0	0	0	0	0	0	0	0	0
Blackburn Rovers	Total		0	0	0	0	0	0	0	0	0	0
St Mirren (loan)	1998–99	Scottish First Division	8	0	0	0	0	0	0	0	8	0
Livingston	2002–03	Scottish Premier League	12	0	0	0	2	0	1	0	15	0
Livingston	2003–04	Scottish Premier League	30	3	5	0	5	0	0	0	40	3
Livingston	2004–05	Scottish Premier League	29	1	2	0	3	0	0	0	34	1
Livingston	2005–06	Scottish Premier League	14	0	0	0	1	0	0	0	15	0
Livingston	Total		85	4	7	0	11	0	1	0	104	4
Coventry City	2006–07	Championship	16	0	0	0	0	0	0	0	16	0
Coventry City	2007–08	Championship	13	0	0	0	2	0	0	0	15	0
Coventry City	Total		29	0	0	0	2	0	0	0	31	0
Plymouth Argyle	2008–09	Championship	10	0	0	0	0	0	0	0	10	0
Plymouth Argyle	2009–10	Championship	9	0	2	0	1	0	0	0	12	0
Plymouth Argyle	Total		19	0	2	0	1	0	0	0	22	0
Aberdeen	2010–11	Scottish Premier League	10	0	2	0	1	0	0	0	13	0
Nuneaton Town	2012–13	Conference Premier	10	0	1	0	0	0	0	0	11	0
Nuneaton Town	2013–14	Conference Premier	3	0	0	0	0	0	0	0	3	0
Nuneaton Town	Total		13	0	1	0	0	0	0	0	14	0
Career total			188	4	13	0	16	0	1	0	218	4

A. The "Other" column constitutes appearances (including substitutes) and goals in the 2002–03 UEFA Cup.

== Honours ==
Livingston

- Scottish League Cup (1): 2003–04

Scotland

- Kirin Cup (1): 2006
