= Yoann Folly =

Togolese footballer (born 1985)

Personal information
- Full name: Yoann Folly
- Date of birth: 6 June 1985 (age 41)
- Place of birth: Paris, France
- Height: 5 ft 11 in (1.80 m)
- Position: Central midfielder

Youth career
- Clairefontaine

Senior career*
Years	Team	Apps	(Gls)
2002–2003	Saint-Étienne	0	(0)
2003–2006	Southampton	14	(0)
2005	→ Nottingham Forest (loan)	1	(0)
2005	→ Preston North End (loan)	2	(0)
2006	→ Sheffield Wednesday (loan)	14	(0)
2006–2008	Sheffield Wednesday	39	(0)
2008–2010	Plymouth Argyle	22	(0)
2010	→ Dagenham & Redbridge (loan)	7	(0)
2010–2012	Aberdeen	18	(1)
Total		117	(1)

International career^{‡}
2003–2006	France U21	10	(0)
2008	Togo	1	(0)
Medal record
Men's football
Representing France
UEFA European Under-17 Championship
Runner-up	2002 Denmark
- * Club domestic league appearances and goals as of 15 January 2011 ‡ National team caps and goals as of 15 September 2008

Yoann Folly (born 6 June 1985) is a retired footballer. His previous clubs include St. Étienne in France, Southampton, Sheffield Wednesday and Plymouth Argyle in England and Aberdeen in Scotland. Born in France, he represented Togo at international level. A series of poor health and injuries eventually lead to Folly's premature retirement in 2012, aged 27.

== Club career ==
=== Southampton ===
Folly was brought to England in 2003 by then Southampton manager Gordon Strachan who paid St. Étienne £250,000 to secure his signature. After numerous managerial changes at Southampton, Folly struggled to get in the team and loan spells at Nottingham Forest (where he scored his first goal in English football against QPR in the FA Cup) and Preston North End followed. Folly was signed on loan by Sheffield Wednesday in January 2006 to ease injury problems as the then manager Paul Sturrock had been impressed by him after taking over as Saints manager from Strachan in 2004. He made his debut on 31 January at Hillsborough, suffering a 2–0 defeat against Luton Town.

=== Sheffield Wednesday ===
Folly's promising displays meant that he joined Wednesday on a permanent basis at the end of the 2005–06 season, rejecting the offer of a new contract at St. Mary's. However, Southampton did receive an undisclosed compensation fee, under FA rules due to him being under the age of 24. He climbed off the substitutes' bench at Hillsborough to score an extra-time winner for Wednesday in the League Cup second round versus Hartlepool United in August 2007.

=== Plymouth Argyle ===
Folly handed in a transfer request to the club in January 2008, citing concerns about his lack of first team football, and he joined Championship rivals Plymouth Argyle that month for a fee believed to be around £200,000, joining manager Paul Sturrock for the third time in his career. Despite this, Folly failed to make a serious impact in the club's first-team, being out for a sustained period of time due to a number of injuries and illnesses.

He made a surprise return to the starting line-up in October 2009 against Middlesbrough, having only appeared once before that in 2009, producing a composed performance in a 1–0 victory for the Pilgrims in which he was the Man of the Match. Folly retained his place in the team for three of the club's next four games, but soon fell out of favour under new manager Paul Mariner. He joined League Two club Dagenham & Redbridge on an initial one-month loan at the end of February 2010.

On 29 March 2010, Folly returned to parent club Plymouth Argyle from his loan spell at Dagenham because of a midfield crisis at the club, but, on 2 May 2010, it was announced that Folly, alongside defender David McNamee and goalkeeper Lloyd Saxton, would be released.

=== Aberdeen ===
After a trial at Scottish Premier League side Aberdeen, he signed for the club on 26 July 2010. Folly became an instant hit with the local supporters playing a crucial part in the team's midfield alongside fellow summer signing, Scottish internationalist Paul Hartley.

Folly scored his first goal for Aberdeen on 26 December 2010 in a 2–1 win at Hibernian. However, just a week later, while up against Dundee United, Folly broke his ankle after a 65th minute tackle by Paul Dixon. Manager Craig Brown, later that day, confirmed Folly would not play again during the 2010–11 season. Near the end of the 2011–12 season, Folly was advised that his contract with Aberdeen would not be extended. On 25 August 2012, Folly had to retire from professional football after being diagnosed with chronic pulmonary embolism.

== International career ==
Folly represented France at under-21 level, but later switched his allegiance to Togo. He was included in Togo's provisional squad for the 2006 FIFA World Cup, but pulled out to pursue his International Career in France. However, Folly did make his senior international debut for Togo in August 2008 against DR Congo.
