= 2013–14 Blackburn Rovers F.C. season =

Blackburn Rovers
2013–14 season
- Managing Director: Derek Shaw
- Manager: Gary Bowyer
- Ground: Ewood Park
- Championship: 8th
- FA Cup: Third round
- League Cup: First round
- Top goalscorer: League: Jordan Rhodes (25); All: Jordan Rhodes (25)
- Highest home attendance: 21,589 vs Burnley (League, 9 March 2013)
- Lowest home attendance: 12,332 vs Brighton (League, 1 April 2013)
- Average home league attendance: 15,034
Home colours	Away colours

The 2013–14 season was Blackburn Rovers' 126th season as a professional football club and its second playing in the Football League Championship since the club's relegation during the 2011–12 Barclays Premier League season.

Caretaker manager for the final few games of the previous season, Gary Bowyer, was given the job permanently.

Grzegorz Sandomierski, Cameron Stewart, David Bentley, David Jones, Todd Kane and Colin Kazim-Richards, all of which were on loan at Rovers during the 12–13 season did not secure permanent contracts, though Todd Kane returned to Rovers for a third loan spell. Mauro Formica and Diogo Rosado, who were both loaned out for the final half of the 12–13 season left the club during the summer transfer window, the former being sold and the latter having his contract terminated. Rubén Rochina and Bruno Ribeiro who were also loaned out towards the end of the 12–13 season returned to the club.

David Dunn's talks over a new contract resulted in a one-year contract extension. Grant Hanley and Lee Williamson also gained contract extensions.

The club tried to move on higher earning players to lighten the wage-bill in preparation for the new rules which were to be introduced in the 2014–15 season.

== Preseason ==
On 24 May 2013, Rovers owners Venkys rewarded Gary Bowyer's performance as 'Caretaker manager' with a 12-month contract as the club's manager.

Bowyer wasted no time in adding to his team making a triple Free transfer signing of midfielder Chris Taylor (Millwall), midfielder Alan Judge (Notts County) and goalkeeper Simon Eastwood (Portsmouth), all of whom are joining the club after their contracts ran out with their clubs. He further indictated that funds had been made available to him by the club's owners, and he would be making changes both incoming and outgoing before the start of the new season.

On 4 June 2013, it was announced that the club had decided to release Micah Evans, Osayamen Osawe, Christopher Dilo, Jamie Maclaren, Reece Hands, Peter Wylie, Ryan Humphreys and Danny Laverty at the ends of their contracts (30 June 2013).

The club also confirmed that young players John O'Sullivan, Raheem Hanley, Hugo Fernandez, Will Beesley, Curtis Haley, Kellen Daly and Darragh Lenihan had all been offered new deals. All were due to be out of contract on 30 June 2013. Young goalkeeper Matthew Urwin and 1st team defender Grant Hanley also signed new contracts at the club.

On 7 June 2013 Operations Director Paul Agnew was fired by the club owners Venkys.

On 10 June 2013, Blackburn Rovers installed Terry McPhillips as assistant manager and Tony Grant as first-team coach, while Carlisle United youth team coach Eric Kinder re-joins Rovers as head of the youth team.

On 21 June 2013, Blackburn Rovers welcome back former player Craig Short who joins Gary Bowyer's backroom staff as first team coach.

On 3 July, Blackburn Rovers announced their new shirt sponsor as RFS (Regulatory Finance Solutions Ltd), a management consultancy business.

== Pre-season friendlies ==
Rovers

Sat 6 July 1	Wrexham	1–1	Blackburn Rovers	Wrexham
15:00	Ormerod 16'	Report	Taylor 90+3'	Stadium: Racecourse Ground; Attendance: 1,216

Sat 13 July 2	Portimonense	0–1	Blackburn Rovers	Portimão
19:30 (local Portuguese time)		Report	Best 14'	Stadium: Estádio Municipal, Algarve

Tue 16 July 3	Crewe	0–1	Blackburn Rovers	Crewe
19:30		Report	G.Hanley 11'	Stadium: Alexandra Stadium; Attendance: 1,922

Sat 20 July 4	Rochdale	2–2	Blackburn Rovers	Rochdale
15:00	Hogan 12'; Vincenti 47'	Report	DJ Campbell 62'; Pedersen 90'	Stadium: Spotland; Attendance: 1,551

Tue 23 July 5	Preston	1–1	Blackburn Rovers	Preston
19:45	Davies 7'	Report	DJ Campbell 36'	Stadium: Deepdale; Attendance: 5,773

Sat 27 July 6	Blackburn Rovers	1–3	Everton	Blackburn
14:00	Dann 87'	Report	Mirallas 24'; Jelavić 55', 78'	Stadium: Ewood Park; Attendance: 9,142

Rovers XI

Sat 6 July	Clitheroe	1–1	Blackburn Rovers XI	Clitheroe
15:00	Nangle 34' (pen.)	Report	Trialist (Pero) 78'	Stadium: Shawbridge

Sat 13 July	Southport	0–2	Blackburn Rovers XI	Southport
15:00		Report	R. Hanley 70'; Forrester 89'	Stadium: The Merseyrail Community

Tue 16 July	Blackburn Rovers XI	4–1	Fleetwood Town	Brockhall
BCD	DJ Campbell, Best; King			Stadium: Behind Closed Doors

Sat 20 July	Harrogate Town	3–0	Blackburn Rovers XI	Harrogate
15:00	Ashley Worsfold, Adam Nowakowski	Report		Stadium: Wetherby Road

Tue 23 July	Blackburn Rovers XI	4–2	Bury	Brockhall
(Unknown)	Yann Songo'o, Leon Best; Unknown Trialist		Unknown; Unknown	Stadium: behind closed doors friendly

Fri 26 July	Bamber Bridge	1–0	Blackburn Rovers XI	Bamber Bridge
19:30	Greg Johnstone			Stadium: Irongate Ground, Brownedge Road

Tue 30 July	Chorley	1–2	Blackburn Rovers XI	Chorley
	Darren Stephenson 23'	Report	Antelmi 86'; Fernandez 90'	Stadium: Victory Park

Sat 3 August	Northwich Victoria	1–0	Blackburn Rovers XI	Manchester
15:00	Unknown			Stadium: Valley Road, Flixton, Trafford

Tue 6 August	Curzon Ashton	1–1	Blackburn Rovers XI	Ashton-under-Lyne
19:30	Simon Woodford 45'	Report	Devarn Green 31'	Stadium: The Tameside Stadium, Richmond St

Sat 10 August	Lancaster City	0–0	Blackburn Rovers XI	Lancaster
15:00		Report		Stadium: Giant Axe Stadium, West Road

- Blackburn Rovers XI matches consisted of the U21s, 1st team players recovering match fitness post injury, U18s and trial players.
  - the Blackburn Rovers XI matches against Fleetwood Town and Bury were played behind closed doors (without a crowd).

== Championship ==
Blackburn's game against Derby County was a fixture released early to mark the special 125th anniversary of the Football League. Gary Bowyer's first game as manager would ironically be against a club he coached at previously before joining Rovers in 2005.

Sun 4 Aug 1	Derby County	1–1	Blackburn Rovers	Derby
16:00	Russell 43' (pen.)	Report	Best 89'	Stadium: Pride Park; Attendance: 21,188

Sat 10 Aug 2	Blackburn Rovers	0–1	Nottingham Forest	Blackburn
15:00		Report	Henderson 90'	Stadium: Ewood Park; Attendance: 14,496

Fri 16 Aug 3	Doncaster Rovers	2–0	Blackburn Rovers	Doncaster
19:45	Robinson 37'; Husband 59'	Report		Stadium: Keepmoat Stadium; Attendance: 8,707

Sat 24 Aug 4	Blackburn Rovers	5–2	Barnsley	Blackburn
15:00	Cairney 17'; Rhodes 30', 39'; King 43'; Kane 58'	Report	Dagnall 13'; Cywka 72'	Stadium: Ewood Park; Attendance: 13,058

Sat 31 Aug 5	Blackburn Rovers	4–1	Bolton Wanderers	Blackburn
15:00	Dunn 26'; Rhodes 27', 83'; Evans 68'	Report	Baptiste 45'	Stadium: Ewood Park; Attendance: 15,828

Sat 14 Sep 6	Burnley	1–1	Blackburn Rovers	Burnley
12:15	Stanislas 76'	Report	Rhodes 85'	Stadium: Turf Moor; Attendance: 15,699

Tue 17 Sep 7	Leicester City	2–1	Blackburn Rovers	Leicester
19:45	Dyer 16'; Nugent 45' (pen.)	Report	Rhodes 70' (pen.)	Stadium: King Power; Attendance: 19,153

Sat 21 Sep 8	Blackburn Rovers	0–0	Huddersfield Town	Blackburn
15:00		Report		Stadium: Ewood Park; Attendance: 14,582

Sat 28 Sep 9	AFC Bournemouth	1–3	Blackburn Rovers	Bournemouth
15:00	Fraser 74'	Report	Rhodes 10', 41' (pen.); Best 24'	Stadium: Dean Court; Attendance: 9,441

Tue 1 Oct 10	Blackburn Rovers	1–0	Watford	Blackburn
19:45	Rhodes 65'	Report		Stadium: Ewood Park; Attendance: 12,981

Sun 6 Oct 11	Wigan Athletic	2–1	Blackburn Rovers	Wigan
15:00	Spurr 62' (o.g.); Boyce 90+2'	Report	Spurr 8'	Stadium: DW Stadium; Attendance: 16,996

Sat 19 Oct 12	Blackburn Rovers	0–1	Charlton Athletic	Blackburn
15:00		Report	Church 7'	Stadium: Ewood Park; Attendance: 13,915

Sat 26 Oct 13	Blackpool	2–2	Blackburn Rovers	Blackpool
15:00	Ince 13' (pen.); Gosling 38'	Report	Rhodes 21' (pen.); Davies 90+2' (o.g.)	Stadium: Bloomfield Road; Attendance: 15,901

Sat 2 Nov 14	Blackburn Rovers	1–0	Middlesbrough	Blackburn
15:00	Lowe 76'	Report		Stadium: Ewood Park; Attendance: 16,645

Sat 9 Nov 15	Brighton & Hove Albion	3–0	Blackburn Rovers	Brighton
15:00	Barnes 37' (pen.), 77'; Forster-Caskey 56'	Report		Stadium: Amex Stadium; Attendance: 27,912

Sat 23 Nov 16	Blackburn Rovers	0–0	Reading	Blackburn
15:00		Report		Stadium: Ewood Park; Attendance: 12,903

Sat 30 Nov 17	Blackburn Rovers	1–0	Leeds United	Blackburn
15:00	Spurr 45'	Report		Stadium: Ewood Park; Attendance: 20,267

Tue 3 Dec 18	Ipswich Town	3–1	Blackburn Rovers	Ipswich
19:45	Hyam 4'; Edwards 48'; Nouble 86'	Report	Rhodes 30'	Stadium: Portman Road; Attendance: 14,953

Sat 7 Dec 19	Queens Park Rangers	0–0	Blackburn Rovers	London
15:00				Stadium: Loftus Road; Attendance: 15,987

Sat 14 Dec 20	Blackburn Rovers	3–2	Millwall	Blackburn
15:00	Rhodes 22'; Marshall 48'; Dunn 85'	Report	Waghorn 42'; Morison 89'	Stadium: Ewood Park; Attendance: 12,642

Sat 21 Dec 21	Yeovil Town	0–1	Blackburn Rovers	Yeovil
15:00		Report	Rhodes 59'	Stadium: Huish Park; Attendance: 7,179

Thu 26 Dec 22	Blackburn Rovers	0–0	Sheffield Wednesday	Blackburn
15:00		Report		Stadium: Ewood Park; Attendance: 18,539

Sun 29 Dec 23	Blackburn Rovers	2–3	Birmingham City	Blackburn
15:00	Rhodes 66', 72'	Report	Novak 12', 18'; Burke 36'	Stadium: Ewood Park; Attendance: 14,344

Wed 01 Jan, 2014 24	Leeds United	1–2	Blackburn Rovers	Leeds
15:00	Smith 53'	Report	Rhodes 13'; Gestede 36'	Stadium: Elland Road; Attendance: 30,145 (1010 Rovers fans)

Sat 11 Jan 25	Blackburn Rovers	1–0	Doncaster Rovers	Blackburn
15:00	Gestede 45'	Report		Stadium: Ewood Park; Attendance: 13,954

Sat 18 Jan 26	Nottingham Forest	4–1	Blackburn Rovers	Nottingham
15:00	Marshall 45'	Report	Lansbury 15' (pen.), 34' (pen.); Paterson 72'; Reid 90'	Stadium: City Ground

Sat 25 Jan 27	Blackburn Rovers	1–1	Derby County	Blackburn
15:00	Marshall (yellow card) 21'; Gestede 47'	Report	Ward (yellow card) 45+2'; Bamford 84'; Bryson (yellow card) 88'	Stadium: Ewood Park; Attendance: 13,796

Wed 29 Jan 28	Barnsley	2–2	Blackburn Rovers	Barnsley
19:45	Proschwitz 29'; Grady 69' (pen.)	Report	Cairney 36'; Gestede 44'; Lowe (yellow card) 58'	Stadium: Oakwell Stadium; Attendance: 9,703

Sat 1 Feb 29	Blackburn Rovers	2–0	Blackpool	Blackburn
15:00	Dunn 20'; Hanley 83'	Report		Stadium: Ewood Park; Attendance: 15,045

Sat 8 Feb 30	Middlesbrough	0–0	Blackburn Rovers	Middlesbrough
15:00	Chalobah (yellow card) 61'; Carayol (yellow card) 66'	Report		Stadium: Riverside Stadium; Attendance: 14,965

Sat 22 Feb 31	Reading	0–1	Blackburn Rovers	Reading
15:00	McAnuff (yellow card) 42'; Obita (yellow card) 76'; Guthrie (yellow card) 90+2'	Report	Conway 39'; Lowe (yellow card) 35'; Varney (yellow card) 82'; Williamson (yellow card) 84'; Taylor (yellow card) 90+8'	Stadium: Madejski Stadium; Attendance: 18,858

Sat 1 Mar 32	Bolton Wanderers	4–0	Blackburn Rovers	Bolton
15:00	Medo 23'; Mason 45'; Spearing 47'; Moritz 90'; Davies (yellow card) 51'	Report	Gestede (yellow card) 5'	Stadium: Reebok Stadium; Attendance: 17,541

Sun 9 Mar 33	Blackburn Rovers	1–2	Burnley	Blackburn
12:45	Rhodes 24'; Varney (yellow card) 55'; Feeney (yellow card) 71'	Report	Shackell 73'; Ings 79'; Arfield (yellow card) 74'	Stadium: Ewood Park; Attendance: 21,589

Wed 12 Mar 34	Blackburn Rovers	0–1	AFC Bournemouth	Blackburn
19:45		Report	Grabban 67'; Ritchie (yellow card) 45+1'	Stadium: Ewood Park; Attendance: 13,081

Sat 15 Mar 35	Huddersfield Town	2–4	Blackburn Rovers	Huddersfield
15:00	Hammill 65'; Wells 71'	Report	Rhodes 4', 55', 81'; Conway 65'; Kilgallon (yellow card) 76'	Stadium: John Smith's Stadium; Attendance: 13,311

Sat 22 Mar 36	Blackburn Rovers	1–1	Leicester City	Blackburn
15:00	Kilgallon 43'; Kilgallon (yellow card) 75'	Report	Vardy 20'; Schmeichel (yellow card) 66'	Stadium: Ewood Park; Attendance: 16,528

Tue 25 Mar 37	Watford	3–3	Blackburn Rovers	Watford
19:45	Cassetti 4'; Deeney 71' (pen.); Battocchio 88'; Angella (yellow card) 76'	Report	Dunn 27'; Conway 64'; Gestede 90+3'; Evans (yellow card) 78'; Kane (yellow card) 85'; Kilgallon (yellow card) 90'	Stadium: Vicarage Road; Attendance: 13,921

Sat 29 Mar 38	Millwall	2–2	Blackburn Rovers	Millwall
15:00	Williams 57' (pen.); Jackson 88' (pen.); McDonald (yellow card) 38'	Report	Keane 65'; King 90+2'; Spurr (yellow card) 14'; Hanley (red card) 56'	Stadium: The Den; Attendance: 8,840

Tue 1 Apr 39	Blackburn Rovers	3–3	Brighton & Hove Albion	Blackburn
19:45	Rhodes 25', 86' (pen.); Cairney 42'	Report	Rodríguez 17'; Greer 79'; Staphens 88'; March (yellow card) 69'; Bruno (yellow card) 75'	Stadium: Ewood Park; Attendance: 12,332

Sat 5 Apr 40	Blackburn Rovers	2–0	Ipswich Town	Blackburn
15:00	Rhodes 64'; Gestede 80'; Kilgallon (yellow card) 56'; Williamson (yellow card) 63'	Report	Wordsworth (yellow card) 37'; Chambers (yellow card) 51'	Stadium: Ewood Park; Attendance: 13,281

Tue 8 Apr 41	Blackburn Rovers	2–0	Queens Park Rangers	Blackburn
19:45	Gestede 9'; Spurr 49'	Report	Simpson (yellow card) 27'	Stadium: Ewood Park; Attendance: 12,915

Sat 12 Apr 42	Sheffield Wednesday	3–3	Blackburn Rovers	Sheffield
15:07	Buxton 30'; Nuhiu 72', 90+5'; Llera (yellow card) 45+1'; Hutchinson (yellow card) 75'; Nuhiu (yellow card) 83'; Afobe (yellow card) 89'	Report	Rhodes 15'; Conway 36'; Keane 43'; Hanley (yellow card) 56'; Williamson (yellow card) 75'; Gestede (yellow card) 80'; Rhodes (yellow card) 90+1'	Stadium: Hillsborough; Attendance: 22,792

Fri 18 Apr 43	Blackburn Rovers	0–0	Yeovil Town	Blackburn
15:00		Report		Stadium: Ewood Park; Attendance: 14,353

Mon 21 Apr 44	Birmingham	2–4	Blackburn Rovers	Birmingham
15:00	Žigić 63'; Gray 84'	Report	Gestede 10', 20', 45+3'; Kane 24'	Stadium: St Andrew's; Attendance: 17,291

Sat 26 Apr 45	Charlton Athletic	1–3	Blackburn Rovers	London
15:00	Sordell 54'	Report	Gestede 26'; Keane 51'; Cairney 64'	Stadium: The Valley; Attendance: 15,718

Sat 3 May 46	Blackburn Rovers	4–3	Wigan	Blackburn
12:15	Cairney 13'; Gestede 19', 35'; Rhodes 84'	Report	Ramis 17'; McClean 59'; Maynard 87'	Stadium: Ewood Park; Attendance: 16,996

BBC Football

== Team statistics ==
=== League table ===
Pos	Team	Pld	W	D	L	GF	GA	GD	Pts	Promotion, qualification or relegation
6	Brighton & Hove Albion	46	19	15	12	55	40	+15	72	Qualification for Championship play-offs
7	Reading	46	19	14	13	70	56	+14	71	
8	Blackburn Rovers	46	18	16	12	70	62	+8	70	
9	Ipswich Town	46	18	14	14	60	54	+6	68	
10	Bournemouth	46	18	12	16	67	66	+1	66	

Source: BBC Sport
Rules for classification: 1) points; 2) goal difference; 3) number of goals scored

=== Result by round ===
Round	1	2	3	4	5	6	7	8	9	10	11	12	13	14	15	16	17	18	19	20	21	22	23	24	25	26	27	28	29	30	31	32	33	34	35	36	37	38	39	40	41	42	43	44	45	46
Ground	A	H	A	H	H	A	A	H	A	H	A	H	A	H	A	H	H	A	A	H	A	H	H	A	H	A	H	A	H	A	A	A	H	H	A	H	A	A	H	H	H	A	H	A	A	H
Result	D	L	L	W	W	D	L	D	W	W	L	L	D	W	L	D	W	L	D	W	W	D	L	W	W	L	D	D	W	D	W	L	L	L	W	D	D	D	D	W	W	D	D	W	W	W
Position	11	17	22	15	11	10	14	15	11	8	9	11	12	9	13	14	13	13	13	11	11	11	12	10	8	8	9	9	8	9	9	10	10	10	10	10	11	12	11	11	11	10	11	10	8	8

Updated to match(es) played on 25 March 2014. Source: Statto.com
A = Away; H = Home; W = Win; D = Draw; L = Loss

== Overall summary ==
=== Summary ===
As of 3 May 2014

Games played	49 (46 Championship, 2 FA Cup, 1 League Cup)
Games won	18 (18 Championship, 0 FA Cup, 0 League Cup)
Games drawn	18 (16 Championship, 1 FA Cup, 1 League Cup)
Games lost	13 (12 Championship, 1 FA Cup, 0 League Cup)
Goals scored	75 (41 Championship, 1 FA Cup, 3 League Cup)
Goals conceded	72 (63 Championship, 6 FA Cup, 3 League Cup)
Goal difference	+3 (+8 Championship, -5 FA Cup, 0 League Cup)
Clean sheets	15 (15 Championship, 0 FA Cup, 0 League Cup)
Yellow cards	80 (76* Championship, 1 FA Cup, 3 League Cup)
Red cards	5 (4 Championship, 0 FA Cup, 1 League Cup)
Most yellows	8 (yellow card) Lowe
Most reds	2 (red card) Hanley
Best result	5–2 vs Barnsley
Worst result	5–0 vs Man City
Most appearances	49 Rhodes
Top scorer	25 Rhodes
Points	70

- Leon Best gained a booking from the bench.
  - Most yellows & reds

== Cup Competitions ==
=== League Cup ===
Rovers started their League Cup campaign earlier than usual against League One outfit Carlisle United, it was the first time Rovers appeared in the first round since 2000.

Wed 7 August R1	Carlisle United	3–3 (a.e.t.) (4–3 p)	Blackburn Rovers	Carlisle
19:45	Amoo 14', 114'; Guy 62'	Report	Cairney 52'; Taylor 56'; Judge 95'	Stadium: Brunton Park; Attendance: 4,372
	Penalties
	Salmon (penalty missed); Beck (penalty scored); Berrett (penalty scored); Noble (penalty scored); Symington (penalty scored)		Judge (penalty scored); Lowe (penalty scored); Rhodes (penalty scored); Taylor (penalty missed); Morris (penalty missed)

Details
- Gary Bowyer rested 8 players from the previous game.
- Carlisle opened the scoring in the first quarter-hour.
- Rovers levelled the score with Tom Cairney's deflected shot in the second half.
- David Dunn's low penalty was saved before taking the lead with Chris Taylor's header.
- A lapse of concentration by Josh King in defence gifted Carlisle an equaliser which forced the game into extra time.
- Alan Judge retook the lead with a fine volley from inside the box, this was later cancelled out again by Carlisle.
- Rovers then went down to 10 men with Tom Cairney's second yellow.
- After extra-time the game ended level at 3–3.
- In the penalty shoot-out Rovers lost out 4-3
- Chris Taylor and Josh Morris missed fourth and fifth penalties while Carlisle missed only their first penalty.

=== FA Cup ===
Sat 4 Jan 3rd Round	Blackburn Rovers	1–1	Manchester City	Blackburn
12:45	Dann 55'	Report	Nastasić (yellow card) 20'; Negredo 45'; Boyata (yellow card) 67' (yellow-red card) 84'	Stadium: Ewood Park; Attendance: 18,813; Referee: Michael Oliver

Wed 15 Jan 3rd Round (Replay)	Manchester City	5–0	Blackburn Rovers	Manchester
20:10	Negredo 45', 47'; Milner (yellow card) 62'; Kolarov (yellow card) 64'; Džeko 67', 79'; Agüero 73'	Report	Campbell (yellow card) 25'	Stadium: Etihad; Attendance: 35,000; Referee: Craig Pawson

== Club ==
=== Technical staff ===
Position	Staff
Manager	(England) Gary Bowyer
Assistant Manager	(England) Terry McPhillips
First Team Coaches	(England) Craig Short (England) Tony Grant
Under-21 Head Coach	(England) Eric Kinder
Under-21 Coach	(Scotland) Colin Hendry
Goalkeeping Coach	(England) John Keeley
Goalkeeping Coach	(England) Joshua Swann
Youth Coach	(England) David Lowe

Last updated: June 2013

=== Medical staff ===
Position	Staff
Doctor	(Scotland) Duncan Robertson
Strength and conditioning coach	(England) Chris Neville
Youth team Doctor	(England) Chris Dalton
Physiotherapist	(England) Dave Fevre (England) Paul Kelly (England) Mark Palmer

Last updated: October 2011

== Squad statistics ==
=== Appearances and goals ===
As of 3 May 2014

No.	Pos	Nat	Player	Total		Championship		FA Cup		League Cup	
No.	Pos	Nat	Player	Apps	Goals	Apps	Goals	Apps	Goals	Apps	Goals
1	GK	(England) ENG	Paul Robinson	23	0	21	0	2	0	0	0
2	DF	(England) ENG	Todd Kane (on loan from Chelsea)	28	2	23+4	2	0	0	1	0
3	DF	(England) ENG	Tommy Spurr	45	3	43	3	2	0	0	0
4	DF	(England) ENG	Matthew Kilgallon	26	1	23+2	1	1	0	0	0
5	DF	(Scotland) SCO	Grant Hanley	41	1	39	1	2	0	0	0
6	MF	(England) ENG	Jason Lowe	42	1	38+1	1	2	0	0+1	0
7	FW	(Norway) NOR	Joshua King	35	2	20+12	2	0+2	0	1	0
8	MF	(England) ENG	David Dunn	24	4	14+9	4	0	0	1	0
11	FW	(Scotland) SCO	Jordan Rhodes	48	25	45+1	25	0+1	0	0+1	0
12	MF	(England) ENG	Ben Marshall	20	2	13+5	2	2	0	0	0
13	GK	(England) ENG	Simon Eastwood	9	0	7	0	0+1	0	1	0
14	MF	(Sweden) SWE	Marcus Olsson	9	0	4+4	0	0	0	1	0
15	FW	(England) ENG	Luke Varney (on loan from Leeds United)	12	0	3+9	0	0	0	0	0
17	MF	(England) ENG	Lee Williamson	33	0	21+10	0	2	0	0	0
19	MF	(England) ENG	Chris Taylor	37	1	14+20	0	2	0	1	1
20	MF	(Nigeria) NGR	Dickson Etuhu	3	0	0+3	0	0	0	0	0
22	MF	(England) ENG	Liam Feeney (on loan from Millwall)	6	0	1+5	0	0	0	0	0
27	DF	(Wales) WAL	Adam Henley	16	0	13+1	0	2	0	0	0
29	MF	(Northern Ireland) NIR	Corry Evans	21	1	17+4	1	0	0	0	0
31	MF	(England) ENG	Connor Mahoney	1	0	0	0	0+1	0	0	0
32	MF	(Scotland) SCO	Craig Conway	18	4	16+2	4	0	0	0	0
34	GK	(England) ENG	Jake Kean	18	0	18	0	0	0	0	0
39	FW	(Benin) BEN	Rudy Gestede	28	13	21+6	13	1	0	0	0
45	MF	(Scotland) SCO	Tom Cairney	40	6	36+1	5	2	0	1	1
Players out on loan:
9	FW	(Republic of Ireland) IRL	Leon Best (on loan to Sheffield Wednesday)	8	2	5+3	2	0	0	0	0
10	FW	(England) ENG	DJ Campbell (on loan to Millwall)	10	0	2+6	0	1+1	0	0	0
15	DF	(Cameroon) CMR	Yann Songo'o (on loan to Ross County)	1	0	0	0	0	0	1	0
18	MF	(Republic of Ireland) IRL	John O'Sullivan (on loan to Southport)	0	0	0	0	0	0	0	0
21	MF	(England) ENG	Alex Marrow (on loan to Fleetwood Town)	4	0	2+1	0	0	0	1	0
22	DF	(England) ENG	Bradley Orr (on loan to Toronto)	0	0	0	0	0	0	0	0
23	FW	(Spain) ESP	Rubén Rochina (on loan to Rayo Vallecano)	5	0	2+3	0	0	0	0	0
24	DF	(England) ENG	Josh Morris (on loan to Fleetwood Town)	5	0	0+4	0	0	0	1	0
25	MF	(Republic of Ireland) IRL	Alan Judge (on loan to Brentford)	12	1	7+4	0	0	0	0+1	1
28	DF	(Republic of Ireland) IRL	Anthony O'Connor (on loan to Torquay United)	0	0	0	0	0	0	0	0
38	FW	(Scotland) SCO	David Goodwillie (on loan to Blackpool)	0	0	0	0	0	0	0	0
Players who have not played:
23	MF	(France) FRA	Bryan Dabo (on loan from Montpellier)	0	0	0	0	0	0	0	0
26	MF	(Republic of Ireland) IRL	Darragh Lenihan	0	0	0	0	0	0	0	0
30	FW	(England) ENG	Dean Rittenberg	0	0	0	0	0	0	0	0
33	GK	(Spain) ESP	David Raya	0	0	0	0	0	0	0	0
Players that played for Blackburn Rovers this season that have left the club:
16	DF	(England) ENG	Scott Dann	26	1	25	0	1	1	0	0
16	DF	(England) ENG	Michael Keane (on loan from Manchester United)	13	3	13	3	0	0	0	0
30	MF	(Portugal) POR	Fábio Nunes	1	0	0+1	0	0	0	0	0
31	DF	(France) FRA	Gaël Givet	1	0	0	0	0	0	1	0

=== Assists ===
As of 16 August 2014

Rank	No.	Pos.	Name	Championship	FA Cup	League Cup	Total
1	32	MF	(Scotland) Craig Conway	11	0	0	11
2	45	MF	(Scotland) Tom Cairney	7	0	1	8
3	7	MF	(Norway) Joshua King	4	0	1	5
3	8	MF	(England) David Dunn	5	0	0	5
5	11	FW	(Scotland) Jordan Rhodes	4	0	0	4
6	6	MF	(England) Jason Lowe	3	0	0	3
6	5	DF	(Scotland) Grant Hanley	3	0	0	3
6	39	FW	(Benin) Rudy Gestede	3	0	0	3
6	16	DF	(England) Scott Dann	3	0	0	3
10	2	DF	(England) Todd Kane	2	0	0	2
10	12	MF	(England) Ben Marshall	2	0	0	2
10	3	DF	(England) Tommy Spurr	2	0	0	2
13	19	MF	(England) Chris Taylor	1	0	0	1
13	4	DF	(England) Matthew Kilgallon	1	0	0	1
13	9	FW	(Republic of Ireland) Leon Best	1	0	0	1
Total				52	0	2	54

== Transfers ==
=== Summer ===
==== In ====
Date	Pos.	Name	From	Fee	Source
1 July 2013	MF	(England) Chris Taylor	(England) Millwall	Free transfer	
1 July 2013	MF	(Republic of Ireland) Alan Judge	(England) Notts County	Free transfer	
1 July 2013	GK	(England) Simon Eastwood	(England) Portsmouth	Free transfer	
2 July 2013	FW	(England) Devarn Green	(England) Burton Albion	Undisclosed	
4 July 2013	FW	(England) DJ Campbell	(England) Q.P.R.	Free transfer	
8 July 2013	DF	(England) Matthew Kilgallon	(England) Sunderland	Free transfer	
9 July 2013	MF	(England) Alex Marrow	(England) Crystal Palace	Undisclosed	
1 August 2013	DF	(England) Tommy Spurr	(England) Doncaster Rovers	Free transfer	
2 August 2013	MF	(Northern Ireland) Corry Evans	(England) Hull City	Undisclosed (est ~ £600,000)	
5 August 2013	DF	(Cameroon) Yann Songo'o	(United States) Sporting Kansas City	Free transfer	
18 August 2013	DF	(England) Aaron Tumwa	(England) Watford	Free transfer	
28 August 2013	MF	(England) Ben Marshall	(England) Leicester City	Undisclosed (est ~ £1,000,000)	
13 December 2013	MF	(England) Connor Mahoney	(England) Accrington Stanley	Undisclosed	

- Total spent ▼ ~ Undisclosed (~ £1,600,000+)

==== Out ====
Date	Pos.	Name	To	Fee	Source
4 June 2013	FW	(England) Micah Evans	(England) Burnley	Released	
4 June 2013	FW	(England) Osayamen Osawe	(England) Southport	Released	
4 June 2013	GK	(France) Christopher Dilo	(Scotland) St Mirren	Released	
4 June 2013	DF	(England) Peter Wylie	(England) Free agent	Released	
4 June 2013	FW	(Australia) Jamie Maclaren	(Australia) Perth Glory	Released	
4 June 2013	MF	(England) Reece Hands	(Scotland) Morton	Released	
4 June 2013	FW	(England) Ryan Humphreys	(England) Free agent	Released	
4 June 2013	MF	(England) Danny Laverty	(England) Free agent	Released	
28 June 2013	FW	(Portugal) Nuno Gomes	(Europe) Free agent	Mutual Consent	
1 July 2013	MF	(England) Danny Murphy	(England) Retired	Mutual Consent	
10 July 2013	DF	(Sweden) Martin Olsson	(England) Norwich City	Undisclosed (est ~ £3,000,000)	
8 August 2013	GK	(Australia) Sebastian Usai	(Sweden) AFC United	Mutual Consent	
16 August 2013	MF	(Argentina) Mauro Formica	(Mexico) Cruz Azul	Undisclosed (est ~ £600,000).	
23 August 2013	FW	(Portugal) Diogo Rosado	(Portugal) Vitória	Mutual Consent	
29 August 2013	MF	(Norway) Morten Gamst Pedersen	(Turkey) Karabükspor	Free Transfer	
30 August 2013	DF	(France) Gaël Givet	(France) Arles-Avignon	Free Transfer	

- Total sold ▲ ~ Undisclosed (~ £3,600,000)

==== Loan in ====
Date	Pos.	Name	From	Loan length	Source
25 June 2013	DF	(England) Todd Kane	(England) Chelsea	Season-long loan	
1 August 2013	MF	(Scotland) Tom Cairney	(England) Hull City	6 Month loan	
26 November 2013	FW	(Benin) Rudy Gestede	(Wales) Cardiff City	1 Month loan	

==== Loan out ====
Date	Pos.	Name	To	Loan length	Source
1 July 2013	DF	(Portugal) Nuno Henrique	(Portugal) Arouca	Season-long loan	
2 July 2013	FW	(Scotland) David Goodwillie	(Scotland) Dundee United	6 Month loan	
18 July 2013	FW	(England) Anton Forrester	(England) Bury	6 Month loan (extended)	
22 July 2013	DF	(England) Jack O'Connell	(England) Rochdale	6 Month loan (extended)	
23 July 2013	DF	(England) Ryan Edwards	(England) Chesterfield	1 Month loan (extended)	
17 August 2013	FW	(Portugal) Edinho Junior	(England) Whitehawk	1 Month loan	
2 September 2013	DF	(England) Bradley Orr	(England) Blackpool	5 Month loan	
1 October 2013	DF	(Republic of Ireland) Anthony O'Connor	(England) Torquay United	1 Month loan (extended)	
28 November 2013	DF	(England) Josh Morris	(England) Carlisle United	1 Month loan	
28 November 2013	DF	(England) Ryan Edwards	(England) Tranmere Rovers	1 Month loan	

==== Youth Loan out ====
Date	Pos.	Name	To	Loan length	Source
13 August 2013	GK	(England) Matthew Urwin	(England) Stalybridge Celtic	3 Month loan	
23 August 2013	FW	(England) Curtis Haley	(England) Bamber Bridge	1 Month loan	

=== Winter ===
==== In ====
Date	Pos.	Name	From	Fee	Source
2 January 2014	MF	(Scotland) Tom Cairney	(England) Hull City	undisclosed (est ~ £600,000)	
2 January 2014	FW	(Benin) Rudy Gestede	(Wales) Cardiff City	undisclosed (est ~ £200,000)	
31 January 2014	MF	(Scotland) Craig Conway	(Wales) Cardiff City	undisclosed (est ~ £100,000)	

- Total spent ▼ ~ undisclosed (est ~ £900,000)

==== Out ====
Date	Pos.	Name	To	Fee	Source
2 January 2014	DF	(Brazil) Bruno Ribeiro	(Brazil) Linense	Free Transfer	
24 January 2014	MF	(Portugal) Fábio Nunes	(Italy) Latina	Free Transfer	
24 January 2014	FW	(Portugal) Edinho Júnior	(United States) Harrisburg City	Free Transfer	
24 January 2014	FW	(England) Curtis Haley	(England) Free agent	Mutual Consent	
28 January 2014	MF	(England) Raheem Hanley	(Wales) Swansea City	Mutual Consent	
31 January 2014	DF	(England) Scott Dann	(England) Crystal Palace	Undisclosed (est ~ £1,500,000+)	
28 February 2014	DF	(Portugal) Nuno Henrique	(Poland) Jagiellonia Białystok	Free Transfer	
15 April 2014	MF	(Spain) Hugo Fernández	(Europe) Free agent	Mutual Consent	

- Total sold ▲ ~ undisclosed (est ~ £1,500,000+)

==== Loan in ====
Date	Pos.	Name	From	Loan length	Source
28 January 2014	MF	(France) Bryan Dabo	(France) Montpellier	Season-Long loan	
8 February 2014	FW	(England) Luke Varney	(England) Leeds United	3-month loan	
7 March 2014	DF	(England) Michael Keane	(England) Manchester United	Season-Long loan	
8 March 2014	MF	(England) Liam Feeney	(England) Millwall	Season-Long loan	

==== Loan out ====
Date	Pos.	Name	To	Loan length	Source
1 January 2014	FW	(England) Jordan Slew	(Scotland) Ross County	Season-Long loan	
8 January 2014	MF	(Republic of Ireland) Alan Judge	(England) Brentford	Season-Long loan	
9 January 2014	MF	(Republic of Ireland) John O'Sullivan	(England) Southport	1 Month loan (extended)	
9 January 2014	DF	(England) Kellen Daly	(England) Southport	1 Month loan (extended)	
13 January 2014	MF	(England) Alex Marrow	(England) Fleetwood Town	Season-Long loan	
18 January 2014	DF	(Cameroon) Yann Songo'o	(Scotland) Ross County	Season-Long loan	
20 January 2014	FW	(Spain) Rubén Rochina	(Spain) Rayo Vallecano	Season-Long loan	
20 January 2014	FW	(England) DJ Campbell	(England) Millwall	Season-Long loan (cut short)	
24 January 2014	FW	(Scotland) David Goodwillie	(England) Blackpool	Season-Long loan	
24 January 2014	DF	(England) Bradley Orr	(Canada) Toronto	Season-Long loan	
14 February 2014	FW	(Republic of Ireland) Leon Best	(England) Sheffield Wednesday	1 Month loan (extended)	
25 February 2014	DF	(England) Josh Morris	(England) Fleetwood Town	1 Month loan (extended)	
7 March 2014	FW	(England) Jordan Preston	(England) Clitheroe	1 Month loan	
21 March 2014	DF	(England) Ryan Edwards	(England) Morecambe	1 Month loan (extended)	
