= 2014–15 Blackburn Rovers F.C. season =

Blackburn Rovers
2014–15 season
- Managing Director: Derek Shaw
- Manager: Gary Bowyer
- Stadium: Ewood Park
- Championship: 9th
- Football League Cup: First round (knocked out by Scunthorpe United)
- FA Cup: Sixth round (knocked out by Liverpool)
- Top goalscorer: League: Jordan Rhodes (21); All: Rudy Gestede (22)
- Highest home attendance: 28,415 vs Liverpool (FA Cup, 8 April 2015)
- Lowest home attendance: 5,352 vs Scunthorpe United (League Cup, 12 August 2014)
- Average home league attendance: 14,907
Home colours	Away colours	Third colours

The 2014–15 season was Blackburn Rovers 127th season as a professional football club and its third playing in the Football League Championship since the club's relegation during the 2011–12 Premier League season. Manager Gary Bowyer, in his second full season in charge, led the club to a 9th-place finish in The Championship and to the FA Cup quarter-finals.

== Summer activity ==
On 7 May, Tommy Spurr signed a new contract keeping him at Blackburn Rovers until the summer of 2016.

On 16 May, Leeds United confirmed that Luke Varney had been released. Varney had been on loan at Rovers from 8 February 2014 until 11 May 2014 with a view to a permanent move.

On 19 May, it was confirmed that Liam Feeney, who ended the 2013–14 campaign on loan at Blackburn Rovers following six appearances, would join Bolton Wanderers when his contract at fellow Championship club Millwall expired in the summer.

On 21 May, it was reported that a £300,000 investment had been made in order to replicate the high standards of Ewood Park's surface last season in preparation for the new campaign. The substantial outlay, sanctioned by the owners, also covered the cost of new machinery and an irrigation upgrade on the sprinkler system at the Academy.

On 24 May, Blackburn Rovers announced that Leon Best, D.J. Campbell, Dickson Etuhu, David Goodwillie, Alex Marrow, and Jordan Slew had been placed on the transfer list.

On 26 May, Blackburn Rovers announced one of the best-value season ticket deals in the country for the forthcoming campaign, along with the return of the Premier League Pledge. So, should Rovers achieve promotion in May 2015, then season ticket holders will be able to purchase a 2015–16 season ticket in the top flight for just 25% of the Championship price.

On 27 May, Gary Bowyer stated that he wanted to sign Manchester United defender Michael Keane on a permanent basis after a successful loan spell with Rovers.

On 2 June, following a successful loan spell and 22 appearances for Brentford in the 2013–14 season, Alan Judge returned to Griffin Park permanently, putting pen-to-paper on a three-year contract for an undisclosed fee.

On 20 June, David Goodwillie departed the club by mutual agreement.

On 23 June, Rovers made their first signing of the summer with the capture of Chris Brown from Doncaster.

On 30 June, midfielder John O'Sullivan announced he had signed a new contract with the club with a one-year extension. The 20-year-old, who spent the second half of last season on loan at Southport, took to Twitter to announce he has penned fresh terms.

On 1 July, following the expiration of his Leeds contract, Varney signed a one-year permanent deal with Blackburn.

On 1 July, Dickson Etuhu and DJ Campbell departed the club by mutual agreement.

Also on 1 July, it was announced that a number of young prospects had put pen to paper on new deals at the football club. Jack O'Connell, who had been on loan with Rochdale during a season in which they clinched promotion from League Two, signed a new two-year deal that sees him contacted to Rovers until the summer of 2016. Fellow youth graduates Bradley Bauress, Kellen Daly, and Darragh Lenihan all signed one-year extensions, whilst Academy forward Modou Cham signed a two-year professional contract. Finally Midfielder David Carson officially arrived at Rovers following a successful trial during the previous season. The 18-year-old joined on a one-year deal.

Again on 1 July, it was reported that eighteen-year-old striker Devarn Green had signed terms on a two-year professional deal.

On 10 July, it was confirmed that Josh Morris would link up with Fleetwood Town once more on a six-month loan deal until 3 January 2015.

On 10 July, Jordan Rhodes signed a two-year extension to his existing deal, committing his future to Rovers for the next five years until the summer of 2019.

On 11 July, David Dunn and Markus Olsson re-signed on new one-year deals after their contracts expired.

Also on 11 July, Alex Baptiste became the third player to sign on a busy day of transfer activity at Ewood Park, the defender joined on a season long loan deal from Bolton Wanderers.

On 14 July, Blackburn Rovers announced Zebra Claims Limited as their main sponsor.

On 15 July, Alex Marrow was released by Rovers by mutual consent.

On 4 August, Leon Best joined Derby County on a season-long loan deal.

Also on 4 August, Anthony O'Connor joined Plymouth Argyle on loan until the turn of the year.

On 5 August, Rubén Rochina returned to his homeland by completing a move to Granada CF.

On 22 August, The owners Venky's block a final £10 million+ bid from Hull City, putting an end to news of Rhodes' on-off move to Hull City.

On 31 August, deadline-day for summer transfers, Rovers signed defender Shane Duffy on a permanent deal from Everton (worth around £400,000 plus add-ons). Rovers also agreed to season-long loan deals for Middlesbrough goalkeeper Jason Steele and Fulham midfielder Ryan Tunnicliffe.

== New Year Activity ==
On 1 January, Jason Steele signed a permanent 3.5 year deal at Rovers after a successful loan from Middlesbrough.

On 1 January, Ryan Tunnicliffe recalled early by Fulham boss Kit Symons after a season-long loan deal was cut short.

On 6 January, Leon Best's season-long loan deal was cancelled by Derby County after failing to impress boss Steve McClaren.

On 8 January, Josh Morris re-joined Fleetwood Town on loan for the remainder of the season.

On 10 January, Marcus Olsson has contract extended until summer of 2016 on account of the defender's impressive start to the season.

On 17 January, Rudy Gestede was left out of squad for away game against Wigan Athletic, as talks with an unnamed premier league club were still ongoing with Rovers over the topscorer.

On 19 January, it was announced later that Crystal Palace were the club that had officially placed a bid for the striker Rudy Gestede, supposedly worth £3.5m.

On 20 January, Leon Best is signed on loan by Brighton for the remainder of the season.

On 30 January, Jake Kean joined Oldham Athletic on loan until the end of the season.

Also on 30 January, Jay Spearing signed for Rovers on loan, the midfielder joined from Bolton Wanderers until the end of May.

On 2 February, Jordan Slew left the club after his contract was terminated, whilst Jack O'Connell and Anthony O'Connor joined Brentford and Plymouth respectively on deadline day.

== Pre-season friendlies ==
Blackburn Rovers kicked off their pre-season campaign against newly promoted Conference side Telford United. Rovers then flew off to Portugal for a week of warm-weather training. On their return Rovers faced Accrington Stanley and Bury (of League Two) and Bradford City of League One. Pre-season ended with friendly at home against Premier League club Stoke City managed by ex-Rover Mark Hughes.

Win Draw Loss Postponed

Sat 12 July 2014 Friendly	AFC Telford United	0–4	Blackburn Rovers	Telford
15:00		Report	Best 56'; Rochina 60', 75'; O'Connell 88'	Stadium: New Bucks Head; Attendance: 1,082

Fri 19 July 2014 Friendly	Freamunde	0–1	Blackburn Rovers	Freamunde
(BCD)			Rhodes (pen)) (pen)

Wed 23 July 2014 Friendly	Accrington Stanley	2–2	Blackburn Rovers	Accrington
19:45	Mingoia 20'; Gray 54'	Report	Dunn 43'; Cairney 61'	Stadium: Store First Stadium; Attendance: 2,133

Sat 26 July 2014 Friendly	Bradford City	0–0	Blackburn Rovers	Bradford
15:00		Report		Stadium: Coral Windows Stadium

Wed 30 July 2014 Friendly	Bury	1–1	Blackburn Rovers	Bury
19:45	Nardiello 71'	Report	Williamson (red card) 45'; Rhodes 85' (pen.)	Stadium: The JD Stadium; Attendance: 1,711

Sun 3 August 2014 Friendly	Blackburn Rovers	1–1	Stoke City	Blackburn
15:00	Rhodes 37'	Report	Bojan 69'	Stadium: Ewood Park; Attendance: 4,351

== Sky Bet Championship ==
=== League table ===
Pos	Team	Pld	W	D	L	GF	GA	GD	Pts
7	Wolverhampton Wanderers	46	22	12	12	70	56	+14	78
8	Derby County	46	21	14	11	85	56	+29	77
9	Blackburn Rovers	46	17	16	13	66	59	+7	67
10	Birmingham City	46	16	15	15	54	64	−10	63
11	Cardiff City	46	16	14	16	57	61	−4	62

Updated to match(es) played on 2 May 2015. Source: Sky Sports
Rules for classification: 1) Points; 2) Goal difference; 3) Number of goals scored

=== Fixtures ===
Blackburn Rovers 2014–15 Championship season opener with Cardiff City moved a day forward to Friday 8 August for live TV coverage.

Win Draw Loss Postponed

==== August ====
Fri 8 August 2014 1	Blackburn Rovers	1–1	Cardiff City	Blackburn
19:45 GMT	Lowe (yellow card) 30'; Cairney 40'	Report	Jones 18'; Brayford (yellow card) 45+2'; Hudson (yellow card) 80'; Burgstaller (yellow card) 86'	Stadium: Ewood Park; Attendance: 15,625 (including 1,193 visiting supporters); Referee: Andrew Madley

Sat 16 August 2014 2	Blackpool	1–2	Blackburn Rovers	Blackpool
15:00 GMT	Cywka 53'; Oriol (yellow card) 68'; Zoko (yellow card) 90+3'	Report	Olsson (yellow card) 18'; Gestede 26', 47' (yellow card) 85'; Marshall (yellow card) 90+2'	Stadium: Bloomfield Road; Attendance: 12,130 (including 2,227 Rovers supporters); Referee: James Adcock

Tue 19 August 2014 3	Norwich City	3–1	Blackburn Rovers	Norwich
19:45 GMT	Grabban 23', 90+4'; Johnson 87'; Bennett (yellow card) 87'	Report	Cairney 1'; Lowe (yellow card) 19'; Evans (yellow card) 26'; Williamson (yellow card) 65'	Stadium: Carrow Road; Attendance: 25,835; Referee: Graham Scott

Sat 23 August 2014 4	Blackburn Rovers	3–2	Bournemouth	Blackburn
15:00 GMT	Rhodes 13'; Hanley 21'; Gestede 24'; Evans (yellow card) 73'; King (yellow card) 90+1'; Robinson (yellow card) 90+4'	Report	Pitman 81' (pen.); Cook (yellow card) 40' (goal) 90'	Stadium: Ewood Park; Attendance: 13,900 (including 319 visiting supporters); Referee: Geoff Eltringham

Sat 30 August 2014 5	Wolverhampton Wanderers	3–1	Blackburn Rovers	Wolverhampton
15:00 GMT	Dicko 12'; Sako 33' 68'; La Parra (yellow card) 25'; Saville (yellow card) 90+5'	Report	Rhodes 59' (pen.); Marshall (yellow card) 3'; Cairney (yellow card) 33'; Evans (yellow card) 43'; Hanley (yellow card) 55'; Varney (yellow card) 90+2'	Stadium: Molineux Stadium; Attendance: 21,260 (including 1,027 Rovers supporters); Referee: Keith Stroud

==== September ====
Sat 13 September 2014 6	Blackburn Rovers	3–1	Wigan Athletic	Blackburn
15:00 GMT	Marshall 53', 82'; Cairney (yellow card) 51'; Rhodes 56'	Report	Andy Delort (yellow card) 29'; James Perch 51'; Martyn Waghorn (yellow card) 89'	Stadium: Ewood Park; Attendance: 15,782 (including 2,079 visiting supporters); Referee: Roger East

Wed 17 September 2014 7	Blackburn Rovers	2–3	Derby County	Blackburn
19:45 GMT	Marshall 1'; Gestede 78'	Report	Ward 9', 58'; Hughes 37'	Stadium: Ewood Park; Attendance: 13,566 (including 677 visiting supporters); Referee: David Webb

Sat 20 September 2014 8	Fulham	0–1	Blackburn Rovers	London
15:00 GMT	McCormack (yellow card) 25'; Hutchinson (red card) 45+2'; Hoogland (yellow card) 62'; Amorebieta (yellow card) 90+2'	Report	Evans (yellow card) 55'; Rhodes 58'; Taylor (yellow card) 88'	Stadium: Craven Cottage; Attendance: 16,456; Referee: Andy D'Urso

Sat 27 September 2014 9	Blackburn Rovers	2–2	Watford	Blackburn
15:00 GMT	Gestede 46'; Cairney (yellow card) 73'; Tunnicliffe 77'	Report	Vydra 30' (yellow card) 61'; Tőzsér 41'; Gomes (yellow card) 57'; Angella (yellow card) 90+6'	Stadium: Ewood Park; Attendance: 14,084 (including 675 visiting supporters); Referee: Darren Drysdale

Tue 30 September 2014 10	Rotherham United	2–0	Blackburn Rovers	Rotherham
19:45 GMT	Árnason 5'; Frecklington (yellow card) 22'; Becchio 32'	Report	Hanley (yellow card) 4'; Duffy (yellow card) 40'; Evans (yellow card) 59'	Stadium: New York Stadium; Attendance: 9,525 (including 1,305 Rovers supporters); Referee: Simon Hooper

==== October ====
Sat 4 October 2014 11	Blackburn Rovers	0–0	Huddersfield Town	Blackburn
15:00 GMT	Hanley (yellow card) 54'; Williamson (yellow card) 71'	Report	Holt (yellow card) 11'	Stadium: Ewood Park; Attendance: 14,662 (including 1,593 visiting supporters); Referee: Nigel Miller

Sat 18 October 2014 12	Ipswich	1–1	Blackburn Rovers	Ipswich
15:00 GMT	McGoldrick 65'; Skuse (yellow card) 83'	Report	Kilgallon (yellow card) 50' (yellow-red card) 64'; Marshall 90+3'	Stadium: Portman Road; Attendance: 16,972 (including 379 Rovers supporters); Referee: James Adcock

Tue 21 October 2014 13	Blackburn Rovers	1–0	Birmingham City	Blackburn
19:45 GMT	Gestede (yellow card) 28'; Marshall 51'; Duffy (yellow card) 74'	Report	Eardley (yellow card) 52' (yellow-red card) 60'	Stadium: Ewood Park; Attendance: 12,852 (including 510 visiting supporters); Referee: Robert Madley

Sat 25 October 2014 14	Nottingham Forest	1–3	Blackburn Rovers	Nottingham
15:00 GMT	Fryatt 37'	Report	Evans (yellow card) 35'; Baptiste 66'; Gestede 75'; Rhodes 77'; Williamson (yellow card) 90'	Stadium: City Ground; Attendance: 27,345 (including 1,043 Rovers supporters); Referee: Oliver Langford

==== November ====
Sat 1 November 2014 15	Blackburn Rovers	3–1	Reading	Blackburn
15:00 GMT	Gestede 16', 38'; Marshall 55'; Evans (yellow card) 71'; Varney (yellow card) 90+6'	Report	Murray 44'; Obita (yellow card) 52'; Akpan (yellow card) 65'; Cooper (yellow card) 76'	Stadium: Ewood Park; Attendance: 14,237 (including 411 visiting supporters); Referee: Carl Boyeson

Tue 4 November 2014 16	Millwall	2–2	Blackburn Rovers	Millwall
19:45 GMT	Wilkinson (red card) 61'; Martin 72'; Williams 88'	Report	Duffy 37'; Gestede 65'	Stadium: The Den; Attendance: 8,250 (including 486 Rovers supporters); Referee: Darren Deadman

Sat 8 November 2014 17	Brighton & Hove Albion	1–1	Blackburn Rovers	Brighton and Hove
15:00 GMT	Dunk (yellow card) 28'; Gardner 42'; Ince (yellow card) 94'	Report	Duffy (yellow card) 35'; Evans (yellow card) 40'; Gestede 51'; Baptiste (yellow card) 73'; Conway (yellow card) 92'	Stadium: Falmer Stadium; Attendance: 24,840 (including 835 Rovers supporters); Referee: Mark Haywood

Sat 22 November 2014 18	Blackburn Rovers	2–1	Leeds United	Blackburn
15:00 GMT	Cairney (yellow card) 26'; Duffy (yellow card) 44'; Rhodes 71', 88' (pen.); Cairney (yellow card) 82' (red card)	Report	Adryan (yellow card) 28'; Doukara 33'; Warnock (yellow card) 96'	Stadium: Ewood Park; Attendance: 21,432 (including 6,839 visiting supporters); Referee: Kevin Wright

Sat 29 November 2014 19	Middlesbrough	1–1	Blackburn Rovers	Middlesbrough
15:00 GMT	Tomlin (yellow card) 56'; Bamford 83'	Report	Evans (yellow card) 55'; Gestede 90+5'	Stadium: Riverside Stadium; Attendance: 18,152 (including 794 Rovers supporters); Referee: Mark Clattenburg

==== December ====
Sat 6 December 2014 20	Blackburn Rovers	1–2	Sheffield Wednesday	Blackburn
15:00 GMT	Baptiste 16'	Report	Lee 3'; Dielna 90+3'; Dielna (yellow card) 90+4'	Stadium: Ewood Park; Attendance: 14,920 (including 1,772 visiting supporters); Referee: Steve Martin

Sat 14 December 2014 21	Brentford	3–1	Blackburn Rovers	London
15:00 GMT	Baptiste (yellow card) 39'; Gestede 45'; Williamson (yellow card) 66'	Report	Douglas 16'; Gray 55'; Jota 61'; Diagouraga (yellow card) 78'	Stadium: Griffin Park; Attendance: 11,848 (including 1,582 Rovers supporters); Referee: Andy Woolmer

Sat 20 December 2014 22	Blackburn Rovers	2–0	Charlton Athletic	Blackburn
15:00 GMT	Rhodes 6', 19'	Report	Buyens (yellow card) 69'	Stadium: Ewood Park; Attendance: 13,231 (including 318 visiting supporters); Referee: David Webb

Fri 26 December 2014 23	Bolton Wanderers	2–1	Blackburn Rovers	Bolton
15:00 GMT	Devite (yellow card) 55'; Heskey 59'; Pratley 62'	Report	King 41'; Duffy (yellow card) 56'; Evans (yellow card) 85'	Stadium: Macron Stadium; Attendance: 23,203 (including 4,362 Rovers supporters); Referee: Craig Pawson

Sun 28 December 2014 24	Blackburn Rovers	0–0	Middlesbrough	Blackburn
15:00 GMT	Gestede (yellow card) 51'; Tunnicliffe (yellow card) 94'	Report	Gibson (yellow card) 21'; Whitehead (yellow card) 45'; Ayala (yellow card) 90'	Stadium: Ewood Park; Attendance: 22,304 (including 6,988 visiting supporters); Referee: Carl Boyeson

==== January ====
Sun 11 January 2015 25	Blackburn Rovers	0–1	Wolverhampton	Blackburn
15:00 GMT	Marshall (yellow card) 67'; Hanley (yellow card) 93'	Report	McDonald (yellow card) 42'; Edwards 48'	Stadium: Ewood Park; Attendance: 15,335 (including 1,498 visiting supporters); Referee: Mark Haywood

Sat 17 January 2015 26	Wigan Athletic	1–1	Blackburn Rovers	Wigan
15:00 GMT	Evans 15'; Hanley (yellow card) 45+3'; Marshall (yellow card) 70'; Evans (yellow card) 76'	Report	McClean (yellow card) 45+3'; Waghorn (yellow card) 59'; McClean 43'; Perch (yellow card) 68'	Stadium: DW; Attendance: 14,652 (including 3,487 Rovers supporters); Referee: Mike Jones

Tue 27 January 2015 27	Derby County	2–0	Blackburn Rovers	Derby
19:45 GMT	Bent 68', 90+3'; Ward (yellow card) 82'; Hughes (yellow card) 90'	Report	Olsson (yellow card) 50'; Conway (yellow card) 82'	Stadium: Pride Park; Attendance: 26,373; Referee: Andy Davies

Sat 31 January 2015 28	Blackburn Rovers	2–1	Fulham	Blackburn
15:00 GMT	Marshall 12'; Rhodes 61'	Report	McCormack 66'	Stadium: Ewood Park; Attendance: 13,603; Referee: Dean Whitestone

==== February ====
Sat 7 February 2015 29	Watford	1–0	Blackburn Rovers	Watford
15:00 GMT	Paredes (yellow card) 20'; Cathcart (yellow card) 28'; Munari	Report	Spearing (yellow card) 19'; Kilgallon (yellow card) 55'	Stadium: Vicarage Road; Attendance: 15,011 (including 720 Rovers supporters); Referee: Andy Madley

Tue 11 February 2015 30	Blackburn Rovers	2–1	Rotherham	Blackburn
15:00 GMT	Conway 41'; Spearing (yellow card) 53'; Cairney (yellow card) 55'; Rhodes 86'	Report	Derbyshire 72'	Stadium: Ewood Park; Attendance: 13,403 (including 924 visiting supporters); Referee: Geoff Eltringham

Tue 17 February 2015 31	Cardiff City	1–1	Blackburn Rovers	Cardiff
19:45 GMT	Morrison 84'	Report	Gestede 90'	Stadium: Cardiff City Stadium; Attendance: 19,057; Referee: Brendan Malone

Sat 21 February 2015 32	Blackburn Rovers	1–1	Blackpool	Blackburn
15:00 GMT	Rhodes 14'	Report	Maher (yellow card) 16'; Hall 42'	Stadium: Ewood Park; Attendance: 14,906 (including 944 visiting supporters); Referee: Mick Russell

Tue 24 February 2015 33	Blackburn Rovers	1–2	Norwich City	Blackburn
19:45 GMT	Baptiste 22'; Spearing (yellow card) 69'	Report	Jerome 65'; Johnson 84'	Stadium: Ewood Park; Attendance: 13,530 (including 1060 visiting supporters); Referee: Scott Duncan

Sat 28 February 2015 34	Bournemouth	0–0	Blackburn Rovers	Bournemouth
15:00 GMT	Arter (yellow card) 48'	Report		Stadium: (England) Goldsands Stadium; Attendance: 10,196 (including 756 Rovers supporters); Referee: Simon Hooper

==== March ====
Wed 4 March 2015 35	Sheffield Wednesday	1–2	Blackburn Rovers	Sheffield
19:45	Maguire 61'	Report	Rhodes 17'; Henley 26'; Henley (yellow card) 49'; Brown (yellow card) 57'; Spurr (yellow card) 60'	Stadium: Hillsborough Stadium; Attendance: 19,953 (including 510 Rovers supporters); Referee: Eddie Ilderton

Wed 11 March 2015 36	Blackburn Rovers	1–0	Bolton Wanderers	Blackburn
19:45 GMT	Henry (yellow card) 85'; Rhodes 90'	Report	Danns (yellow card) 52'; Heskey (yellow card) 66'; Mills (yellow card) 81'	Stadium: Ewood Park; Attendance: 15,362 (including 2362 visiting supporters); Referee: Paul Tierney

Sat 14 March 2015 37	Charlton Athletic	1–3	Blackburn Rovers	London
15:00 GMT	Buyens 57'; Fox (yellow card) 84'	Report	Rhodes 15', 78'; Conway 18'; Steele (yellow card) 56'; Brown (yellow card) 77'	Stadium: The Valley (London); Attendance: 14,888 (including 703 Rovers supporters); Referee: Charles Breakspear

Tue 17 March 2015 38	Blackburn Rovers	2–3	Brentford	Blackburn
19:45 GMT	Gestede 5'; Taylor 45'	Report	Judge (yellow card) 35'; Long 44'; Jota 52'; Dean (yellow card) 47'; Gray 84'	Stadium: Ewood Park; Attendance: 13,382; Referee: Seb Stockbridge

Sat 21 March 2015 39	Blackburn Rovers	0–1	Brighton	Blackburn
15:00 GMT		Report	Kilgallon 26' (og); Ledesma (yellow card) 36'	Stadium: Ewood Park; Attendance: 13,605; Referee: Stuart Attwell

==== April ====
Sat 5 April 2015 40	Leeds United	0–3	Blackburn Rovers	Leeds
15:00 GMT	Austin (red card) 39'; Antenucci (yellow card) 68'; Murphy (yellow card) 84'; Taylor (yellow card) 88'	Report	Henley (yellow card) 55'; Cairney 62'; Rhodes 69'; Taylor (yellow card) 77'; Spearing 80'	Stadium: Elland Road; Attendance: 25,293; Referee: Gary Sutton

Sat 11 April 2015 41	Reading	0–0	Blackburn Rovers	Reading
15:00 GMT	Robson-Kanu (yellow card) 90'	Report	Williamson (yellow card) 81'	Stadium: Madejski Stadium; Attendance: 17,564; Referee: Michael Bull

Tue 14 April 2015 42	Birmingham	2–2	Blackburn Rovers	Birmingham
19:45 GMT	Grounds 64'; Gray 78'	Report	Kilgallon 8'; Rhodes 68'; Rhodes (yellow card) 88'	Stadium: St. Andrew's; Attendance: 15,066; Referee: James Linington

Sat 18 April 2015 43	Blackburn Rovers	3–3	Nottingham Forest	Blackburn
15:00 GMT	Gestede 3', 35', 82'; Williamson (yellow card) 90'	Report	Antonio 7', 88'; Lansbury 45'; Vaughan (yellow card) 62'	Stadium: Ewood Park; Attendance: 13,876; Referee: Andy Haines

Tue 21 April 2015 44	Blackburn Rovers	2–0	Millwall	Blackburn
19:45 GMT	Gestede 78'; Rhodes 90'	Report	Cowan-Hall (yellow card) 73'	Stadium: Ewood Park; Attendance: 12,884; Referee: Nigel Miller

25 April 2015 45	Huddersfield Town	2–2	Blackburn Rovers	Huddersfield
15:00 GMT	Butterfield 39'; Hudson (yellow card) 79'; Lolley 84'	Report	Gestede 26'; Rhodes 31'; Lenihan (yellow card) 53'	Stadium: John Smith's Stadium; Attendance: 17,056; Referee: (England) Brendan Malone

==== May ====
2 May 2015 46	Blackburn Rovers	3–2	Ipswich Town	Blackburn
12:15 GMT	Rhodes 36'; Conway 42'; Gestede 58'	Report	Murphy 2', 82'; Skuse (yellow card) 39'; Tabb (yellow card) 43'	Stadium: Ewood Park; Attendance: 16,469; Referee: Graham Scott

=== Results ===
Round	1	2	3	4	5	6	7	8	9	10	11	12	13	14	15	16	17	18	19	20	21	22	23	24	25	26	27	28	29	30	31	32	33	34	35	36	37	38	39	40	41	42	43	44	45	46
Ground	H	A	A	H	A	H	H	A	H	A	H	A	H	A	H	A	A	H	A	H	A	H	A	H	H	A	A	H	A	H	A	H	H	A	A	H	A	H	H	A	H	A	A	H	A	H
Result	D	W	L	W	L	W	L	W	D	L	D	D	W	W	W	D	D	W	D	L	L	W	L	D	L	D	L	W	L	W	D	D	L	D	W	W	W	L	L	W	D	D	D	W	D	W
Position	12	5	14	10	14	8	13	10	10	11	12	13	11	8	7	8	7	6	6	7	8	8	8	9	10	10	10	9	9	9	9	10	10	11	10	10	10	10	10	10	10	9	9	9	9	9

Updated to match(es) played on 25 April 2015. Source: BBC Sport
A = Away; H = Home; W = Win; D = Draw; L = Loss

== FA Cup ==
Rovers entered the FA Cup in the Third Round Proper which commenced on Saturday 3 January 2015.

Sat 3 January 2015 Third round	Charlton Athletic	1–2	Blackburn Rovers	London
15:00 GMT	Buyens (yellow card) 45+6'; Gudmundsson 55'; Gudmundsson (yellow card) 70'; Buyens (yellow card) 72' (red card)	Report	Taylor 4', 59'; Duffy (yellow card) 45'; Kilgallon (yellow card) 68'; Cairney (yellow card) 69'	Stadium: The Valley; Attendance: 8,727 (1,038 away); Referee: Keith Stroud

Sat 24 January 2015 Fourth round	Blackburn Rovers	3–1	Swansea City	Blackburn
12:45 GMT	Taylor 23'; Williamson (yellow card) 29'; Gestede 78'; Conway 89'	Report	Bartley (red card) 7'; Sigurdsson 21'; Dyer (yellow card) 85'; Sigurdsson (red card) 90+2'	Stadium: Ewood Park; Attendance: 5,928 (590 away); Referee: Craig Pawson

Sat 14 February 2015 Fifth round	Blackburn Rovers	4–1	Stoke City	Blackburn
15:00 GMT	King 36', 50', 55'; Gestede 45+7' (pen.); Williamson (yellow card) 18'; Evans (yellow card) 60'; Cairney (yellow card) 81'	Report	Crouch 10'; Diouf (yellow card) 22'; Wollscheid (yellow card) 41'; Cameron (red card) 45+6'; Bardsley (yellow card) 84'; Whelan (yellow card) 86'	Stadium: Ewood Park; Attendance: 13,934 (4,737 away); Referee: Anthony Taylor

Sun 8 March 2015 Sixth round	Liverpool	0–0	Blackburn Rovers	Liverpool
16:00 GMT	Emre Can (yellow card) 45'	Report	Cairney (yellow card) 88'	Stadium: Anfield; Attendance: 43,820 (5,800 away); Referee: Andre Marriner

Wed 8 April 2015 Sixth round replay	Blackburn Rovers	0–1	Liverpool	Blackburn
19:45 BST	Evans (yellow card) 68'	Report	Coutinho 70'; Sterling (yellow card) 90+3'	Stadium: Ewood Park; Attendance: 28,415 (7,263 away); Referee: Kevin Friend

== Football League Cup ==
The first round draw of the 2014-15 Football League Cup took place on Tuesday 17 June at 10:00am.

Rovers hosted Scunthorpe United in the first round.

Win Draw Loss

Tue 12 August 2014 R1	Blackburn Rovers	0–1	Scunthorpe United	Blackburn
19:45	King (yellow card) 75'; Varney (yellow card) 78'; Williamson (yellow card) 88'	Summary	Llera (yellow card) 22'; Bishop 34'	Stadium: Ewood Park; Attendance: 5,352 (including 551 visiting supporters); Referee: Sebastian Stockbridge

== Club Staff ==
=== Technical Staff ===
Position	Staff
Manager	(England) Gary Bowyer
Assistant Manager	(England) Terry McPhillips
First Team Coaches	(England) Craig Short (England) Tony Grant
Under-21 Head Coach	(England) Damien Johnson
Under-21 Assistant Coach	(Australia) John Filan
Goalkeeping Coach	(England) John Keeley

Last updated: June 2013

=== Medical Staff ===
Position	Staff
Doctor	(Scotland)
Strength and conditioning coach	(England) Chris Neville
Youth team Doctor	(England) Chris Dalton
Physiotherapist	(England) Dave Fevre

== Squad statistics ==
=== Appearances and goals ===
As of 13 May 2015

No.	Pos	Nat	Player	Total		Championship		FA Cup		League Cup	
No.	Pos	Nat	Player	Apps	Goals	Apps	Goals	Apps	Goals	Apps	Goals
1	GK	(England) ENG	Paul Robinson	7	0	7+0	0	0+0	0	0+0	0
2	DF	(Wales) WAL	Adam Henley	24	1	15+3	1	5+0	0	1+0	0
3	DF	(England) ENG	Tommy Spurr	13	0	10+2	0	0+1	0	0+0	0
4	DF	(England) ENG	Matthew Kilgallon	27	1	22+0	1	5+0	0	0+0	0
5	DF	(Scotland) SCO	Grant Hanley (captain)	31	1	31+0	1	0+0	0	0+0	0
6	MF	(England) ENG	Jason Lowe	14	0	11+1	0	1+0	0	1+0	0
7	FW	(Norway) NOR	Joshua King	19	4	5+11	1	2+0	3	1+0	0
8	MF	(England) ENG	David Dunn	12	0	1+8	0	1+1	0	1+0	0
9	FW	(England) ENG	Chris Brown	21	0	11+9	0	1+0	0	0+0	0
10	MF	(Scotland) SCO	Tom Cairney	45	3	32+7	3	5+0	0	0+1	0
11	FW	(Scotland) SCO	Jordan Rhodes	47	21	39+6	21	1+1	0	0+0	0
12	MF	(England) ENG	Ben Marshall	47	6	37+5	6	4+0	0	1+0	0
13	GK	(England) ENG	Simon Eastwood	11	0	6+0	0	5+0	0	0+0	0
14	MF	(Sweden) SWE	Marcus Olsson	45	0	41+0	0	4+0	0	0+0	0
15	DF	(England) ENG	Alex Baptiste (on loan From Bolton Wanderers)	34	3	29+3	3	2+0	0	0+0	0
17	MF	(England) ENG	Lee Williamson	34	0	22+6	0	5+0	0	1+0	0
18	MF	(Republic of Ireland) IRL	John O'Sullivan	2	0	1+1	0	0+0	0	0+0	0
19	MF	(England) ENG	Chris Taylor	21	4	7+9	1	3+1	3	1+0	0
20	DF	(Cameroon) CMR	Yann Songo'o	1	0	0+0	0	0+0	0	1+0	0
21	FW	(England) ENG	Paul Taylor (on loan From Ipswich Town)	5	0	2+3	0	0+0	0	0+0	0
22	DF	(Republic of Ireland) IRL	Shane Duffy	22	1	18+1	1	3+0	0	0+0	0
24	DF	(England) ENG	Ryan Nyambe	0	0	0+0	0	0+0	0	0+0	0
25	MF	(England) ENG	Jay Spearing (on loan From Bolton Wanderers)	15	1	12+3	1	0+0	0	0+0	0
26	MF	(Republic of Ireland) IRL	Darragh Lenihan	3	0	2+1	0	0+0	0	0+0	0
27	FW	(England) ENG	Devarn Green	0	0	0+0	0	0+0	0	0+0	0
29	MF	(Northern Ireland) NIR	Corry Evans	41	1	37+1	1	2+1	0	0+0	0
30	GK	(England) ENG	Jason Steele	31	0	31+0	0	0+0	0	0+0	0
31	MF	(England) ENG	Connor Mahoney	0	0	0+0	0	0+0	0	0+0	0
32	MF	(Scotland) SCO	Craig Conway	44	4	29+9	3	4+1	1	0+1	0
33	GK	(Spain) ESP	David Raya	2	0	2+0	0	0+0	0	0+0	0
39	FW	(Benin) BEN	Rudy Gestede	44	22	31+8	20	2+2	2	0+1	0
Players out on loan:
16	FW	(England) ENG	Luke Varney (on loan to Ipswich Town)	14	0	0+11	0	0+2	0	1+0	0
34	GK	(England) ENG	Jake Kean (on loan to Oldham Athletic)	1	0	0+0	0	0+0	0	1+0	0
—	DF	(England) ENG	Josh Morris (on loan to Fleetwood Town)	0	0	0+0	0	0+0	0	0+0	0
—	FW	(Republic of Ireland) IRL	Leon Best (on loan to Brighton & Hove Albion)	0	0	0+0	0	0+0	0	0+0	0
Players that played for Blackburn Rovers this season that have left the club:
21	DF	(England) ENG	Jack O'Connell	1	0	0+0	0	0+0	0	1+0	0
23	DF	(Canada) CAN	Doneil Henry (on loan From West Ham United)	3	0	3+0	0	0+0	0	0+0	0
25	MF	(England) ENG	Ryan Tunnicliffe (on loan From Fulham)	17	1	10+7	1	0+0	0	0+0	0

=== Goalscorers ===
As of 13 May 2015

Rank	No.	Pos.	Name	League	FA Cup	League Cup	Total
1	39	FW	(Benin) Rudy Gestede	20	2	0	22
2	11	FW	(Scotland) Jordan Rhodes	21	0	0	21
3	12	MF	(England) Ben Marshall	6	0	0	6
4	7	FW	(Norway) Josh King	1	3	0	4
=	19	MF	(England) Chris Taylor	1	3	0	4
=	32	MF	(Scotland) Craig Conway	3	1	0	4
7	15	DF	(England) Alex Baptiste	3	0	0	3
=	10	MF	(Scotland) Tom Cairney	3	0	0	3
9	5	DF	(Scotland) Grant Hanley	1	0	0	1
=	25	MF	(England) Ryan Tunnicliffe	1	0	0	1
=	22	DF	(Republic of Ireland) Shane Duffy	1	0	0	1
=	29	MF	(Northern Ireland) Corry Evans	1	0	0	1
=	2	DF	(Wales) Adam Henley	1	0	0	1
=	25	MF	(England) Jay Spearing	1	0	0	1
=	4	DF	(England) Matthew Kilgallon	1	0	0	1
Total				65	9	0	74

=== Assists ===
As of 13 May 2015

Rank	No.	Pos.	Name	League	FA Cup	League Cup	Total
1	32	MF	(Scotland) Craig Conway	10	1	0	11
2	10	MF	(Scotland) Tom Cairney	6	2	0	8
3	12	MF	(England) Ben Marshall	7	0	0	7
4	39	FW	(Benin) Rudy Gestede	4	2	0	6
5	14	DF	(Sweden) Marcus Olsson	4	1	0	5
6	11	FW	(Scotland) Jordan Rhodes	4	0	0	4
=	9	FW	(England) Chris Brown	3	1	0	4
8	22	DF	(Republic of Ireland) Shane Duffy	1	1	0	2
9	17	MF	(England) Lee Williamson	1	0	0	1
=	19	MF	(England) Chris Taylor	1	0	0	1
=	2	DF	(Wales) Adam Henley	1	0	0	1
=	23	DF	(Canada) Doneil Henry	1	0	0	1
—	—	—	No assist	22	1	0	17
Total				65	9	0	74

=== Disciplinary record ===
As of 13 May 2015

No.	Pos.	Name	Championship			FA Cup		League Cup		Total		
No.	Pos.	Name	Yellow card	(yellow card) (red card)	Red card	Yellow card	Red card	Yellow card	Red card	Yellow card	(yellow card) (red card)	Red card
1	GK	(England) Paul Robinson	1	0	0	0	0	0	0	1	0	0
6	MF	(England) Jason Lowe	2	0	0	0	0	0	0	2	0	0
7	MF	(Norway) Josh King	1	0	0	0	0	1	0	2	0	0
12	MF	(England) Ben Marshall	4	0	0	0	0	0	0	4	0	0
14	MF	(Sweden) Marcus Olsson	3	0	0	0	0	0	0	3	0	0
16	FW	(England) Luke Varney	2	0	0	0	0	1	0	3	0	0
17	MF	(England) Lee Williamson	6	0	0	2	0	1	0	9	0	0
19	MF	(England) Chris Taylor	1	0	0	0	0	0	0	1	0	0
29	MF	(Northern Ireland) Corry Evans	11	0	0	2	0	0	0	13	0	0
39	FW	(Benin) Rudy Gestede	3	0	0	0	0	0	0	3	0	0
10	MF	(Scotland) Tom Cairney	5	1	0	3	0	0	0	8	1	0
5	DF	(Scotland) Grant Hanley	5	0	0	0	0	0	0	5	0	0
22	DF	(Republic of Ireland) Shane Duffy	5	0	0	1	0	0	0	6	0	0
4	DF	(England) Matthew Kilgallon	3	1	0	1	0	0	0	4	1	0
25	MF	(England) Ryan Tunnicliffe	2	0	0	0	0	0	0	2	0	0
15	DF	(England) Alex Baptiste	2	0	0	0	0	0	0	2	0	0
32	MF	(Scotland) Craig Conway	2	0	0	0	0	0	0	2	0	0
25	MF	(England) Jay Spearing	3	0	0	0	0	0	0	3	0	0
3	DF	(England) Tommy Spurr	1	0	0	0	0	0	0	1	0	0
2	DF	(Wales) Adam Henley	2	0	0	0	0	0	0	2	0	0
9	FW	(England) Chris Brown	2	0	0	0	0	0	0	2	0	0
23	DF	(Canada) Doneil Henry	1	0	0	0	0	0	0	1	0	0
30	GK	(England) Jason Steele	1	0	0	0	0	0	0	1	0	0
23	DF	(England) Paul Taylor	1	0	0	0	0	0	0	1	0	0
11	FW	(Scotland) Jordan Rhodes	1	0	0	0	0	0	0	1	0	0
26	MF	(Republic of Ireland) Darragh Lenihan	1	0	0	0	0	0	0	1	0	0
Total			71	2	0	9	0	3	0	83	2	0

=== Suspensions served ===
Date	Missed	Player	Reason	Opponent Missed
30 Sep	1	Corry Evans	5 (yellow card)	Huddersfield Town
21 Oct	1	Matthew Kilgallon	(yellow card) (yellow-red card)	Birmingham City
22 Nov	1	Tom Cairney	(yellow card) (yellow-red card)	Middlesbrough
26 Dec	2	Corry Evans	10 (yellow card)	Middlesbrough, Charlton Athletic^{(FA Cup)}

== Transfers ==
=== Summer ===
==== In ====
Date	Pos.	Name	From	Fee	Source
23 June 2014	FW	(England) Chris Brown	(England) Doncaster Rovers	Free Transfer	
1 July 2014	FW	(England) Luke Varney	(England) Leeds United	Free Transfer	
1 September 2014	DF	(Republic of Ireland) Shane Duffy	(England) Everton	Undisclosed (est ~£400,000 + add-ons)	

- Total spent ▼ ~ Undisclosed (~ £400,000+)

==== Youth ====
Date	Pos.	Name	From	Fee	Source
1 July 2014	MF	(England) David Carson	(England) Ashington	Undisclosed Fee	
27 August 2014	GK	(Scotland) Ryan Crump	(England) Liverpool	Free	
16 October 2014	DF	(Wales) Sam Jones	(England) Unattached	Free	
19 December 2014	DF	(England) Connor Thomson	(England) Carlisle United	Free	

==== Out ====
Date	Pos.	Name	To	Fee	Source
16 May 2014	DF	(England) Will Beesley	(England) Southport	Released	
16 May 2014	MF	(England) Robbie Cotton	(England) Sheffield	Released	
16 May 2014	DF	(England) Ryan Edwards	(England) Morecambe	Released	
16 May 2014	MF	(Spain) Hugo Fernandez	(Europe) Free agent	Released	
16 May 2014	MF	(New Zealand) Timothy Payne	(New Zealand) Auckland City	Released	
16 May 2014	FW	(Germany) Deniz Pero	(Turkey) Bucaspor	Released	
16 May 2014	GK	(England) Matthew Urwin	(England) Bradford City	Released	
2 June 2014	MF	(Republic of Ireland) Alan Judge	(England) Brentford	£350,000	
20 June 2014	FW	(Scotland) David Goodwillie	(Scotland) Aberdeen	Mutual Consent	
1 July 2014	MF	(Nigeria) Dickson Etuhu	(Sweden) AIK	Mutual Consent	
1 July 2014	FW	(England) DJ Campbell	(England) Maidenhead United	Mutual Consent	
15 July 2014	MF	(England) Alex Marrow	(England) Carlisle United	Mutual Consent	
5 August 2014	FW	(Spain) Rubén Rochina	(Spain) Granada	Undisclosed	

- Total sold ▲£350,000 + undisclosed fees

==== Loan In ====
Date	Pos.	Name	From	Loan length	Source
11 July 2014	DF	(England) Alex Baptiste	(England) Bolton Wanderers	Season-Long Loan	
1 September 2014	GK	(England) Jason Steele	(England) Middlesbrough	Season-Long Loan	
1 September 2014	MF	(England) Ryan Tunnicliffe	(England) Fulham	Season-Long Loan (recalled)	

==== Loan Out ====
Date	Pos.	Name	To	Loan length	Source
10 July 2014	MF	(England) Josh Morris	(England) Fleetwood Town	6 Month Loan (3 January 2015) (Extended)	
4 August 2014	FW	(Republic of Ireland) Leon Best	(England) Derby County	Season-Long Loan (Sent Back)	
4 August 2014	DF	(Republic of Ireland) Anthony O'Connor	(England) Plymouth Argyle	5 Month Loan (10 January 2015)	
29 August 2014	FW	(England) Jordan Slew	(England) Port Vale	4 Month Loan (3 January 2015)	
1 September 2014	DF	(England) Jack O'Connell	(England) Rochdale	4 Month Loan (6 January 2015)	
15 September 2014	GK	(England) Jake Kean	(England) Yeovil Town	1 Month Loan (12 October 2014)	
19 September 2014	GK	(Spain) David Raya	(England) Southport	1 Month Loan (18 October 2014) (Extended)	
19 September 2014	MF	(Republic of Ireland) John O'Sullivan	(England) Accrington Stanley	1 Month Loan (18 October 2014) (Extended)	
21 October 2014	MF	(Republic of Ireland) Darragh Lenihan	(England) Burton Albion	1 Month Loan (22 November 2014) (Extended)	

=== Winter ===
==== In ====
Date	Pos.	Name	From	Fee	Source
1 January 2015	GK	(England) Jason Steele	(England) Middlesbrough	Undisclosed (est £100,000)	

- Total spent ▼ ~ Undisclosed (~ £100,000+)

==== Out ====
Date	Pos.	Name	To	Fee	Source
2 February 2015	FW	(England) Jordan Slew	(England) Cambridge United	Mutual Consent	
2 February 2015	DF	(England) Jack O'Connell	(England) Brentford	Undisclosed (reportedly £300,000)	
2 February 2015	DF	(Republic of Ireland) Anthony O'Connor	(England) Plymouth Argyle	Undisclosed	
2 March 2015	DF	(England) Bradley Orr	(England) Unattached	Mutual Consent	

- Total sold ▲ ~ Undisclosed (~ £300,000+)

==== Loan In ====
Date	Pos.	Name	From	Loan length	Source
30 January 2015	MF	(England) Jay Spearing	(England) Bolton Wanderers	End Of Season	
4 March 2015	DF	(Canada) Doneil Henry	(England) West Ham United	One Month Loan (6 April 2015)	
26 March 2015	FW	(England) Paul Taylor	(England) Ipswich Town	End Of Season	

==== Loan Out ====
Date	Pos.	Name	To	Loan length	Source
9 January 2015	MF	(England) Josh Morris	(England) Fleetwood Town	End Of Season	
20 January 2015	FW	(Republic of Ireland) Leon Best	(England) Brighton & Hove Albion	End Of Season	
30 January 2015	GK	(England) Jake Kean	(England) Oldham Athletic	End Of Season	
2 February 2015	FW	(Scotland) Jordan Preston	(Scotland) Ayr United	End Of Season	
19 February 2015	MF	(Republic of Ireland) John O'Sullivan	(England) Barnsley	1 Month Loan (21 March 2015)	
20 February 2015	FW	(England) Luke Varney	(England) Ipswich Town	3 Month Loan (Extended)	
