= Jake Kean =

English footballer (born 1991)

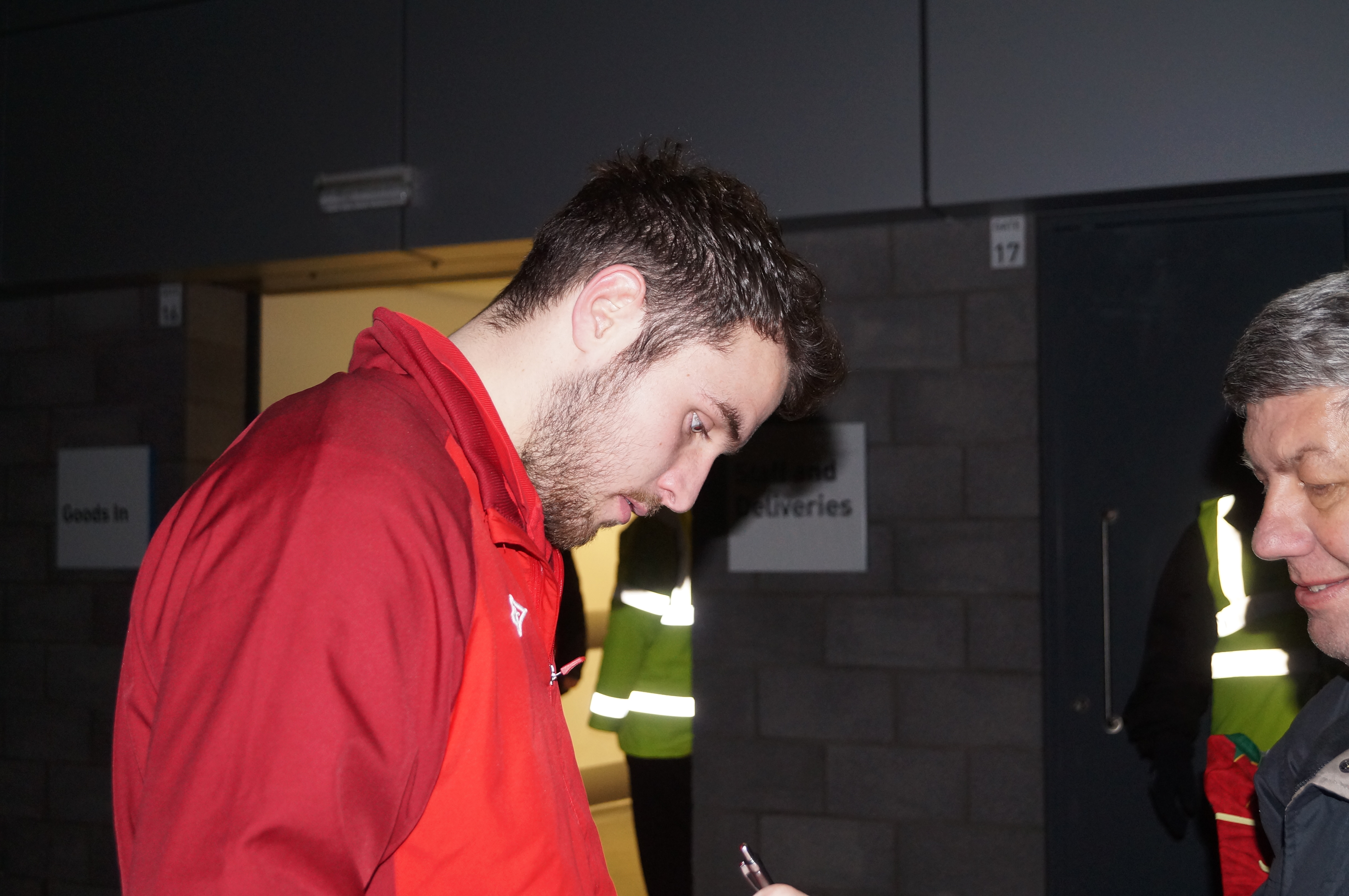

Personal information
- Full name: Jacob Kendall Kean
- Date of birth: 4 February 1991 (age 35)
- Place of birth: Derby, England
- Height: 1.93 m (6 ft 4 in)
- Position: Goalkeeper

Team information
- Current team: Burton Albion (Head of Goalkeeping)

Youth career
- 2006–2009: Derby County

Senior career*
Years	Team	Apps	(Gls)
2009–2015	Blackburn Rovers	37	(0)
2010–2011	→ Hartlepool United (loan)	19	(0)
2011	→ Rochdale (loan)	14	(0)
2014	→ Yeovil Town (loan)	5	(0)
2015	→ Oldham Athletic (loan)	11	(0)
2015–2016	Norwich City	0	(0)
2016	→ Colchester United (loan)	3	(0)
2016	→ Swindon Town (loan)	3	(0)
2016–2018	Sheffield Wednesday	0	(0)
2016–2017	→ Mansfield Town (loan)	19	(0)
2018	→ Grimsby Town (loan)	3	(0)
2018–2019	Mansfield Town	0	(0)
2019–2021	Notts County	0	(0)
Total		114	(0)

International career
2011	England U20	1	(0)
- * Club domestic league appearances and goals as of 17:07, 14 January 2019 (UTC)

Jacob Kendall Kean (born 4 February 1991) is an English football coach and former professional footballer, who is head of goalkeeping at EFL League One side Burton Albion.

As a player, he was a goalkeeper who played for Blackburn Rovers, appearing as their first choice keeper for both the 2012–13 and 2013–14 seasons before picking up a knee injury. He has since had loan spells with Hartlepool United, Rochdale, and Yeovil Town and Oldham Athletic. He signed for Norwich City in 2015 but failed to make a first team appearance and instead spent time on loan with Colchester United and Swindon Town. He later took in spells with Sheffield Wednesday, Mansfield Town and Grimsby Town before joining Notts County as a player/coach. Kean has played internationally for England under-20s once.

== Career ==
=== Blackburn Rovers ===
Born in Derby, Kean started his youth career at Derby County, before moving to Blackburn Rovers towards the end of the 2008–09 season. Kean joined Hartlepool United in September 2010 in a month-long loan deal. This was later extended due to injuries to Scott Flinders and Andy Rafferty. Kean made his debut on 18 September in a 0–0 away draw with Brentford. He kept ten clean sheets during his four-month spell at Victoria Park.

Kean signed for Rochdale on loan for the entire 2011–12 season. His loan was cut short in November when Blackburn recalled him because of an injury to Paul Robinson. Kean returned to Rovers because of the injury to first-choice Paul Robinson and was back up to Mark Bunn for a few games, near to the end of the season he was permanently on the bench due to an injury to Bunn. On 13 May, he made his Premier League debut away to Chelsea in goal due to injuries to both Robinson and Bunn, this also meant both sides played second-choice goalkeepers with Ross Turnbull deputising for Petr Čech in the opposite goal. Blackburn lost the game 2–1 with goals for Chelsea scored by John Terry and Raul Meireles and Yakubu scoring for Rovers. Midway through the 2012–13 Championship season, Kean took over the starting spot from Paul Robinson, keeping three clean sheets in wins over Derby County, Bristol City and Ipswich Town, also playing a key role in Blackburn's shock 1–0 win against Arsenal in the FA Cup 5th round, keeping a clean sheet and made crucial saves that kept Blackburn in the game. Kean started the 2013–14 season as first-choice until the beginning of December when he lost his first-team place to Simon Eastwood. Kean slipped further down the pecking order in January with the return from injury of Paul Robinson, who was re-instated as number one. He was left on the sidelines for the most part of the 2014–15 season by Gary Bowyer and left the club by mutual consent on 31 July 2015. Kean joined Yeovil Town on an initial one-month loan deal on 15 September 2014. On 30 January 2015, Kean joined Oldham Athletic on loan for the remainder of the season.

=== Norwich City ===
After being released by Blackburn, Kean signed a two-year contract with newly promoted Premier League side Norwich City on 1 August 2015. He left the club by mutual consent on 18 July 2016.

=== Sheffield Wednesday ===
Following his release by Norwich, Kean joined Championship side Sheffield Wednesday. On 31 December 2016, Kean joined League Two side Mansfield Town on loan for the remainder of the season. On 5 January 2018 Kean signed for Grimsby Town on loan for the rest of the 2017–18 season. His contract was not renewed at the end of his loan spell and was released from Sheffield Wednesday.

=== Mansfield Town ===
In December 2018, Kean re-joined Mansfield Town on a short-term deal after their first choice goalkeeper, Bobby Olejnik, suffered an injury.

== Coaching career ==
In August 2019, at the age of 28 Kean joined Notts County as goalkeeping coach and signed on as back-up player to provide back up for Sam Slocombe and Ross Fitzsimons.

On 19 November 2021, it was announced that Kean had joined Burton Albion as the club's Head of Goalkeeping.

== International career ==
Following an impressive four-month loan spell for Hartlepool United, Ray Clemence was spotted scouting Kean during a 4–0 defeat to Peterborough United, and on 9 February 2011 he played 83 minutes for Brian Eastwick's England Under-20 side during a 2–1 defeat to France at Shrewsbury Town's New Meadow.

== Career statistics ==
As of match played 6 January 2018

Appearances and goals by club, season and competition
Club	Season	League			FA Cup		League Cup		Other		Total	
Club	Season	Division	Apps	Goals	Apps	Goals	Apps	Goals	Apps	Goals	Apps	Goals
Blackburn Rovers	2009–10	Premier League	0	0	0	0	0	0	—		0	0
Blackburn Rovers	2010–11	Premier League	0	0	—		0	0	—		0	0
Blackburn Rovers	2011–12	Premier League	1	0	0	0	0	0	—		1	0
Blackburn Rovers	2012–13	Championship	18	0	5	0	1	0	—		24	0
Blackburn Rovers	2013–14	Championship	18	0	0	0	0	0	—		18	0
Blackburn Rovers	2014–15	Championship	0	0	0	0	1	0	—		1	0
Blackburn Rovers	Total		37	0	5	0	2	0	—		44	0
Hartlepool United (loan)	2010–11	League One	19	0	4	0	—		2 (Note: Appearances in Football League Trophy)	0	25	0
Rochdale (loan)	2011–12	League One	14	0	—		—		1	0	15	0
Yeovil Town (loan)	2014–15	League One	5	0	—		—		—		5	0
Oldham Athletic (loan)	2014–15	League One	11	0	—		—		—		11	0
Norwich City	2015–16	Premier League	0	0	—		1	0	—		0	0
Colchester United (loan)	2015–16	League One	3	0	2	0	—		—		5	0
Swindon Town (loan)	2015–16	League One	3	0	—		—		—		3	0
Sheffield Wednesday	2016–17	Championship	0	0	0	0	1	0	0	0	0	0
Sheffield Wednesday	2017–18	Championship	0	0	0	0	0	0	—		0	0
Sheffield Wednesday	Total		0	0	0	0	0	0	0	0	0	0
Mansfield Town (loan)	2016–17	League Two	19	0	—		—		2 (Note: Appearances in EFL Trophy)	0	21	0
Grimsby Town (loan)	2017–18	League Two	3	0	0	0	0	0	0	0	1	0
Career total			112	0	11	0	2	0	5	0	130	0
