= List of goalkeepers who have scored in the Premier League =

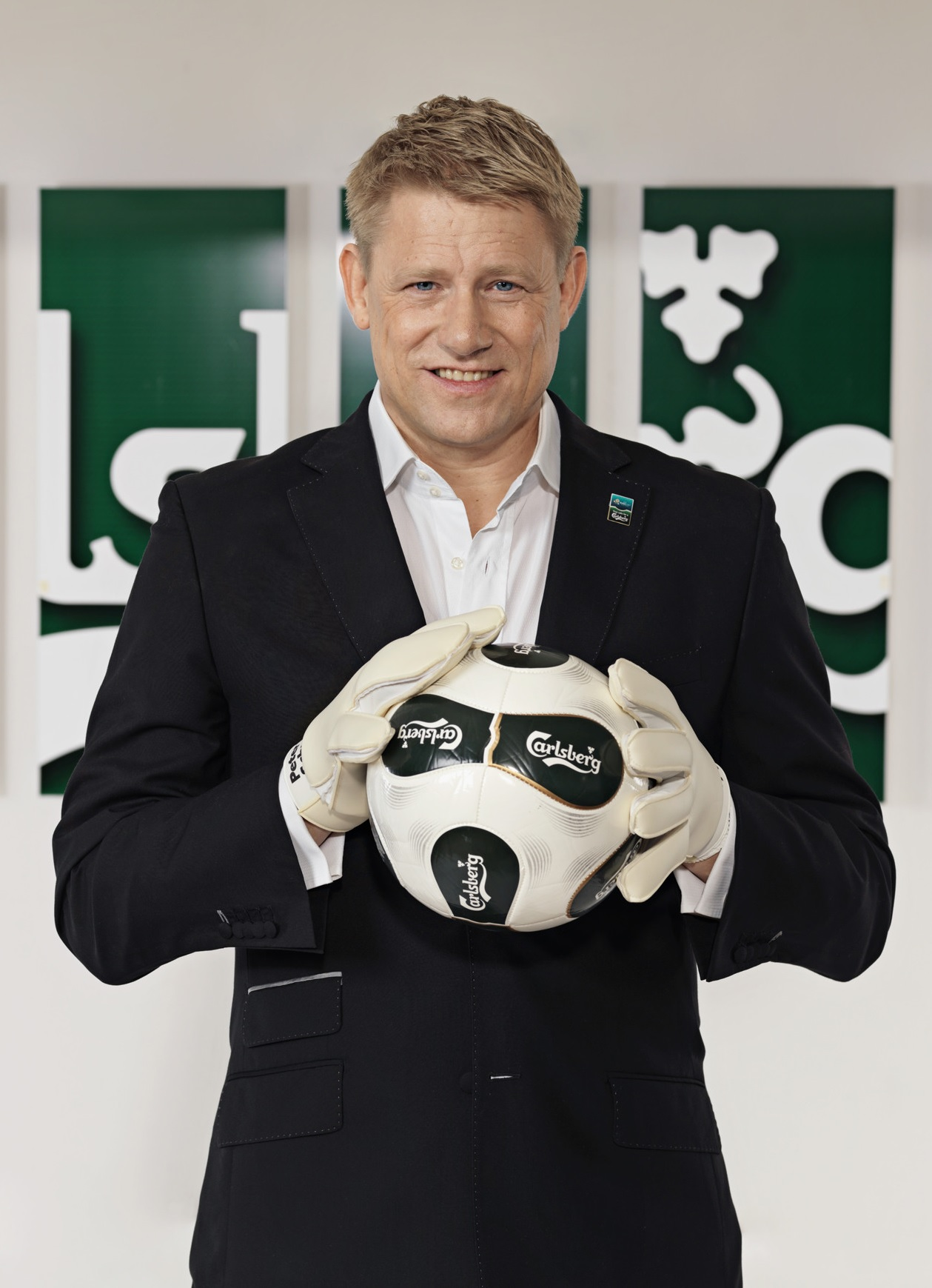
Peter Schmeichel was the first goalkeeper to score in the Premier League.

The Premier League is an association football competition which forms the top level of the English football league system. It was founded in 1992, and in that time, only six goalkeepers have scored a goal in the competition. Whilst in some countries, goalkeepers often take penalty kicks, this is not the case in English football, and as such, no Premier League goalkeeper has scored from a penalty kick. In 2018, Manchester City manager Pep Guardiola said that it would be "disrespectful" to allow goalkeeper Ederson to take penalties apart from in penalty shoot-outs.

In 2001, Peter Schmeichel became the first goalkeeper to score in the Premier League, and the most recent goalkeeper to do so was Alisson Becker in 2021.

== Background ==
Prior to the Premier League's first season in 1992–93, the top division of English football was the Football League First Division. Goalkeepers who scored a goal in the First Division include Peter Shilton in 1967 and Steve Sherwood in 1984.

== Goal summaries ==
In 2001, Peter Schmeichel became the first goalkeeper to score in the Premier League. Schmeichel scored a volley for Aston Villa from 6 yards (5.5 m) out after coming up the field for a 90th minute corner. Schmeichel had previously scored in a UEFA Cup match for Manchester United against Rotor Volgograd, and had previously scored eight goals for Danish clubs Hvidovre and Brøndby. Brad Friedel was the second goalkeeper to achieve the feat in 2004, when he scored from short range in the aftermath of an 89th minute corner. His goal for Blackburn Rovers against Charlton Athletic made the score 2–2, though Charlton eventually won the match 3–2. In 2007, Paul Robinson was the third goalkeeper to score in a Premier League match, when a free kick around 75 yards (69 m) from goal bounced and then went over the head of opposition goalkeeper Ben Foster.

The fourth and fifth goals were both from clearances from within the goalkeepers' own penalty areas and were assisted by the wind. They were scored by Tim Howard and Asmir Begović, in 2012 and 2013 respectively. Howard's goal was measured as a distance of around 85 yards (78 m), and Begović's goal was measured as a distance of 91.9 metres (100.5 yd). In 2014, Guinness World Records acknowledged Begović's goal as the "longest goal scored in football", and Begović held the record until 2021 when it was beaten by Newport County goalkeeper Tom King in an EFL League Two match. Begović's goal was timed at 13 seconds from the start of the match. In May 2021, Liverpool goalkeeper Alisson Becker scored a 95th-minute header to give his side the 2–1 victory against West Bromwich Albion. He was the first goalkeeper to score a headed goal in the Premier League, and the first goalkeeper to score in any official match for Liverpool. Becker was also the first Premier League goalkeeper to score a match winning goal.

== List ==
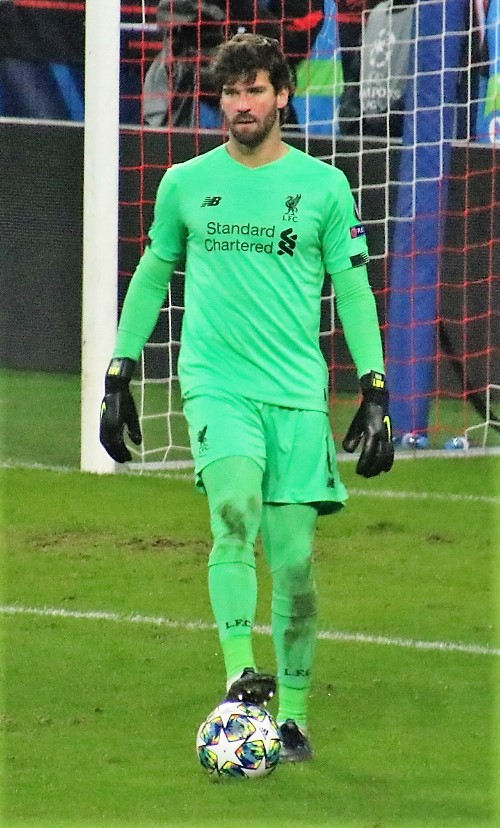
Alisson Becker is the most recent goalkeeper to have scored in the Premier League.

Scores and results list the player's team is listed first.

Premier League goals scored by goalkeepers
No.	Date	Player	Nationality	For	Against	Score	Result
1	20 October 2001	Peter Schmeichel	Denmark	Aston Villa	Everton	2–3	2–3
2	21 February 2004	Brad Friedel	United States	Blackburn Rovers	Charlton Athletic	2–2	2–3
3	17 March 2007	Paul Robinson	England	Tottenham Hotspur	Watford	2–0	3–1
4	4 January 2012	Tim Howard	United States	Everton	Bolton Wanderers	1–0	1–2
5	2 November 2013	Asmir Begović	Bosnia and Herzegovina	Stoke City	Southampton	1–0	1–1
6	16 May 2021	Alisson Becker	Brazil	Liverpool	West Bromwich Albion	2–1	2–1

== See also ==
- List of goalscoring goalkeepers
