= Paul Robinson (footballer, born 1979) =

English association football player (born 1979)

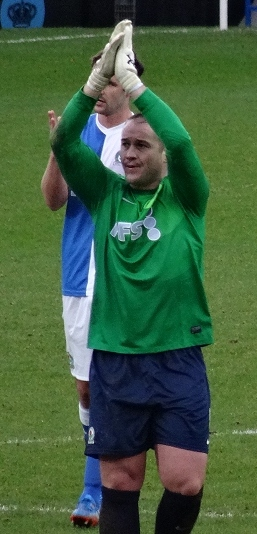
- Robinson playing for Blackburn Rovers in 2014

Personal information
- Full name: Paul William Robinson
- Date of birth: 15 October 1979 (age 47)
- Place of birth: Beverley, England
- Height: 6 ft 4 in (1.93 m)
- Position: Goalkeeper

Youth career
- York City
- 1996–1998: Leeds United

Senior career*
Years	Team	Apps	(Gls)
1998–2004	Leeds United	95	(0)
2004–2008	Tottenham Hotspur	137	(1)
2008–2015	Blackburn Rovers	189	(0)
2015–2017	Burnley	3	(0)
Total		424	(1)

International career
1999–2002	England U21	14	(0)
2003–2007	England	41	(0)
- * Club domestic league appearances and goals

Paul William Robinson (born 15 October 1979) is an English former professional footballer who played as a goalkeeper in the Premier League and Football League for Leeds United, Tottenham Hotspur, Blackburn Rovers and Burnley. Robinson is a former England international, earning 41 caps between 2003 and 2007.

Robinson joined Leeds United at age 16, becoming professional aged 18, and made 119 appearances for the club, 95 of which were in league matches, and scored a goal in a League Cup tie. He also was voted Leeds United's Player of the Year in 2003 by the supporter's club. In 2004, following Leeds' relegation from the Premier League to the Championship, he moved to Premier League club Tottenham Hotspur. He played in 175 matches for Tottenham, including 137 Premier League matches, and scored another goal (this time in a Premier League match, whilst he also won the 2008 League Cup with the club). He was signed by Blackburn Rovers in 2008, being voted the Blackburn Rovers Player of the Year in 2011 by the supporters' club.

Robinson made his full international debut in a 3–1 friendly defeat against Australia on 12 February 2003. His competitive international debut came a year later in a 2–1 victory over Poland, during a qualification match for the 2006 FIFA World Cup. Twenty-five of his forty-one appearances came in competitive internationals, with his last cap coming in a 2–1 defeat to Russia on 17 October 2007. He retired from international football on 8 August 2010. In February 2014 Robinson reversed his decision to retire and said that he would be open to an international return for the 2014 FIFA World Cup if England manager Roy Hodgson decided to recall him.

== Club career ==
=== Leeds United ===
Born in Beverley, East Yorkshire, Robinson played local Sunday league football in the Hull Boys Sunday League. He played in the York City youth system before coming through the youth ranks at Leeds United after joining following a trial. He won the FA Youth Cup with Leeds during the 1996–97 season, and kept a clean sheet on his senior debut, a 0–0 draw against Chelsea on 25 October 1998.

Robinson's appearances at Leeds were at first sporadic, although he did play in a UEFA Champions League match against Barcelona, which finished 1–1. He was Leeds' number two goalkeeper behind Nigel Martyn, making five league appearances in his debut season and none in the following season. He made 16 appearances in the 2000–01 season, following Martyn sustaining an injury, but did not play a league match in the following season. Terry Venables dropped Martyn after he requested a break from pre-season training after the 2002 FIFA World Cup. Robinson became Leeds' number one goalkeeper as a result, with Robinson playing in all 38 matches of the 2002–03 season. Martyn left for Everton at the start of the following season, with young goalkeepers Danny Milosevic and Scott Carson taking over as backups for Robinson.

During the 2003–04 season, Robinson scored his first professional goal, a header against Swindon Town in the closing moments of a League Cup match. The goal levelled the scores and forced extra time; with no further goals scored during extra time, the match then went to a penalty shoot-out. Robinson saved a penalty, whilst a Swindon player missed another one by hitting the post, resulting in Leeds winning the match. Leeds were subsequently relegated from the Premier League that season, with Robinson conceding 75 goals in 36 matches, being sent off in one match. He made 119 appearances in total for Leeds, 95 in the Premier League, during his seven-year spell at the club, and was also voted Player of the Year by the Leeds United supporters' club in 2003.

=== Tottenham Hotspur ===
Robinson transferred to Tottenham Hotspur in May 2004, for a fee of £1.5 million; the club had initially attempted to sign him for £2.5 million in January, with the intention of Robinson staying at Leeds until the end of the season, only for this to fail as it violated the Premier League's rules. He made his league debut for Tottenham in a 1–1 draw against Liverpool, going on to make 36 league appearances in total during the 2004–05 season. The following two seasons saw Robinson play in all 76 of the club's league matches; the latter season was notable for Robinson scoring the second goal of his professional career, in a Premier League match against Watford at White Hart Lane on 17 March 2007. He took a free-kick from 95 yd (87 m) from the opposition goal and the ball bounced over the head of Watford goalkeeper Ben Foster and into the goal. He became the third goalkeeper of six in Premier League history (excluding own goals) to score after Peter Schmeichel for Aston Villa in 2001, Brad Friedel for Blackburn Rovers in 2004, then followed by Tim Howard for Everton in 2012, Asmir Begović for Stoke City in 2013 and Alisson Becker for Liverpool in 2021. Robinson captained the team in their 1–0 League Cup quarter-final win over Southend United, and in their 0–0 FA Cup third round draw at Cardiff City as Ledley King and Robbie Keane were both injured.

The 2007–08 season proved to be less successful. An error during international duty was an example of how his form had dipped, and he was replaced by Radek Černý for part of the season, initially after Robinson made an error against Reading in the FA Cup. Although he briefly returned to the team, he made another error in the League Cup final. Despite his error, Tottenham were able to beat Chelsea 2–1, with Robinson collecting the first major trophy of his career. He made 25 appearances in the league for Tottenham during this season, and made 175 appearances in total during his time at the club, 137 in the Premier League.

=== Blackburn Rovers ===
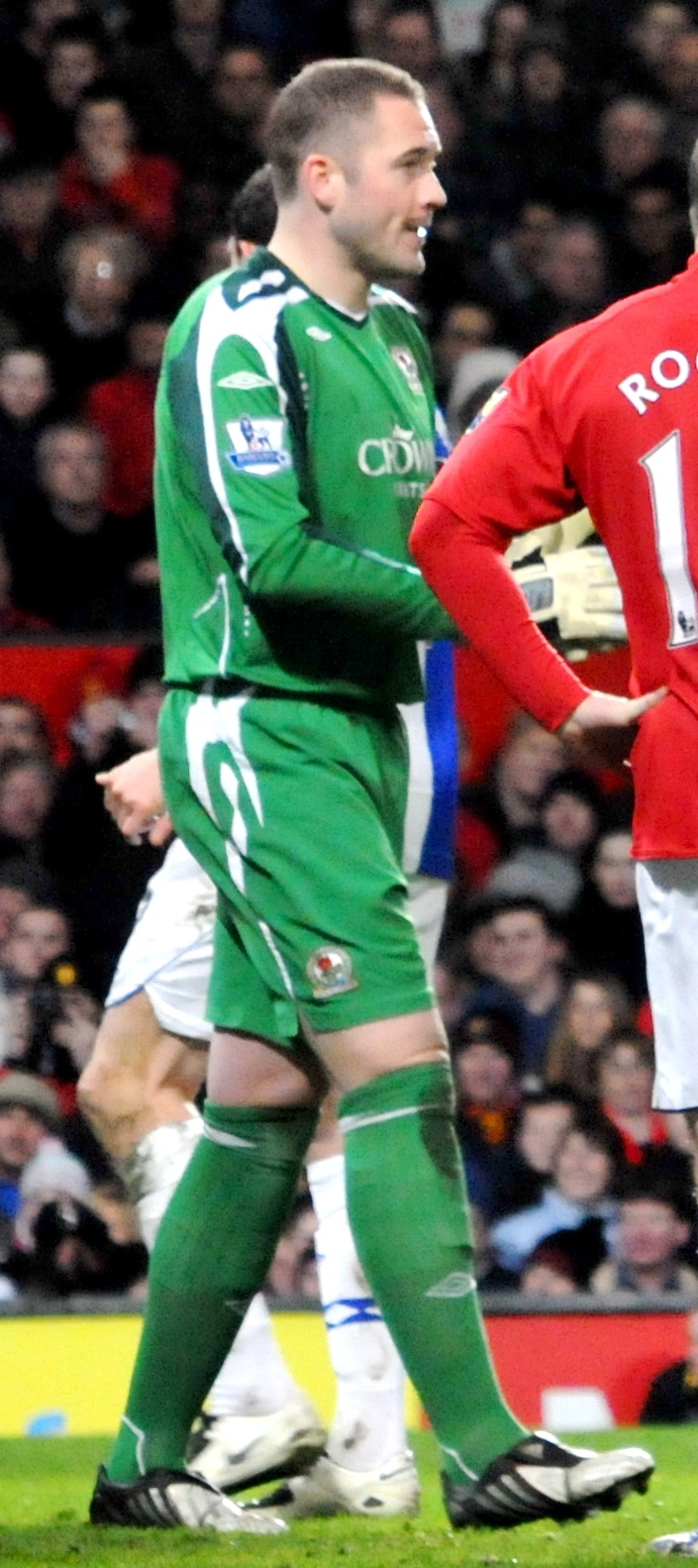
Robinson playing for Blackburn Rovers in 2009

Robinson joined Blackburn Rovers on 25 July 2008 for a fee of £3.5 million on a five-year deal, making him Paul Ince's first signing at the club. He made his Premier League debut for Blackburn on 16 August, in a 3–2 victory over Everton. He was named man of the match in a 1–0 win against Wigan Athletic. Robinson helped Blackburn to finish 15th in the league, keeping five clean sheets in his 35 Premier League appearances. On 2 December 2009, in a League Cup match against Chelsea, Robinson saved two penalties during the penalty shoot-out, with Blackburn winning 4–3 on penalties as extra time ended with the score at 3–3. Robinson ended the season with a total of 12 Premier League clean sheets, as Blackburn finished tenth in the league.

Although Arsenal were rumoured to be signing Robinson at the beginning of the 2010–11 season, no move materialized. Robinson was in goal during Blackburn's 7–1 defeat away to Manchester United on 27 November, with five of the goals being scored by Dimitar Berbatov. Despite this result, Blackburn reached as high as seventh position in the league in January, following a 2–0 victory over West Bromwich Albion. This resulted in Robinson being yet again linked with a move away from Blackburn, with Aston Villa, Liverpool and former club Tottenham all rumoured to be interested in signing him. Following the win over West Brom, however, Blackburn's form dipped sharply, with the club eventually finishing in 15th, having won just 2 out of its last 14 matches. Robinson kept 8 clean sheets in the 36 league matches he played in, while he also conceded the 500th league goal of his career towards the end of the season, becoming the fifth goalkeeper in Premier League history to do so. He also was voted the 2011 Player of the Year by the Blackburn Rovers' supporters club.

The 2011–12 season started much as the previous one had ended, with Blackburn taking until 17 September to win a match, a 4–3 victory at home to Arsenal. On 20 November, Robinson won a penalty against Wigan; the goalkeeper had gone up to the Wigan box for a late corner, and was kicked in the face by Wigan midfielder David Jones. The penalty was scored by Yakubu to level the score at 3–3. In a repeat of the previous season, Robinson conceded seven goals as Blackburn lost an away match 7–1, this time to Arsenal, on 4 February 2012. A run of 30 matches without a clean sheet was finally ended in a 2–0 win against Wolverhampton Wanderers, a match which also took Blackburn out of the relegation zone, whilst another 2–0 win, this time against Sunderland, was the first time Robinson had kept back-to-back clean sheets since August 2010. Blackburn, however, would only score three points more all season and were relegated to the Championship after finishing in 19th position. In contrast to the two previous seasons where Robinson had averaged ten league clean sheets a season, he kept just three clean sheets in the league, having played 34 matches. All three clean sheets came from matches where Blackburn won 2–0. Following the departures of Christopher Samba and Ryan Nelsen from Ewood Park, Robinson became the Blackburn captain, initially on a temporary basis but later as the permanent captain.

Following Blackburn's relegation, it was rumoured that Robinson would immediately return to the top flight, with Queens Park Rangers and West Ham United said to be interested, however no move materialized. Speculation continued over Robinson's future throughout the season, with Brad Friedel being rumoured to be returning to the club (a rumour he denied), further fuelled by Robinson being dropped in December for a match against Blackpool in favour of Jake Kean, with Robinson having played every match at that point in the season. However, following the match against Blackpool, Robinson did not make any further appearances, with Kean taking the goalkeeper position, fuelling further rumours that Robinson could leave, and Robinson was made available for loan in February. In March, Robinson was ruled out for the rest of the season with a back injury; however, in April, he suffered complications, and was ruled out for six months as a result of a pulmonary embolism following his surgery. He finished the season having made 21 league appearances for the club.

After over a year without playing in a match, during which time he studied Italian at Bocconi University, Robinson made his comeback in an under-21 match against Middlesbrough on 16 December 2013. On 4 January 2014, Robinson returned to the senior Blackburn team, playing in the 1–1 FA Cup draw with Manchester City. On 11 January 2014, Robinson started his first league match for Blackburn in 13 months, starting against Doncaster Rovers at Ewood Park and keeping a clean sheet in a 1–0 win, lifting Rovers up to eighth in the Championship table. He remained as first choice goalkeeper for the next few matches, and took back-to-back clean sheets against Blackpool, Middlesbrough and Reading in February.

Robinson started the first seven matches of the 2014–15 season, but with the loan signing of Jason Steele from Middlesbrough, he was dropped from the first team. On 15 November 2014, Robinson announced his intentions of leaving the club in the January transfer window. He said that, "I'm pretty much surplus to requirements at Blackburn. I'm not even on the bench. I'm training hard at the moment though. My contract is up at the end of the season so I'm not sure if that's got anything to do with it. I want to keep playing and, I believe, I've got another two or three years left in me." At the end of the season, it was announced that he would be released at the end of his contract.

=== Burnley ===
Robinson joined Championship club Burnley, in a controversial move, on a free transfer on 26 January 2016 on a contract until the end of the season. Whilst also slating former club, Blackburn On 27 June 2016, he extended his contract, signing a new one-year contract with the newly promoted Premier League club. He made his debut for Burnley on 26 November 2016, his first Premier League appearance since 2012.

On 17 July 2017, Robinson announced his retirement from football.

== International career ==
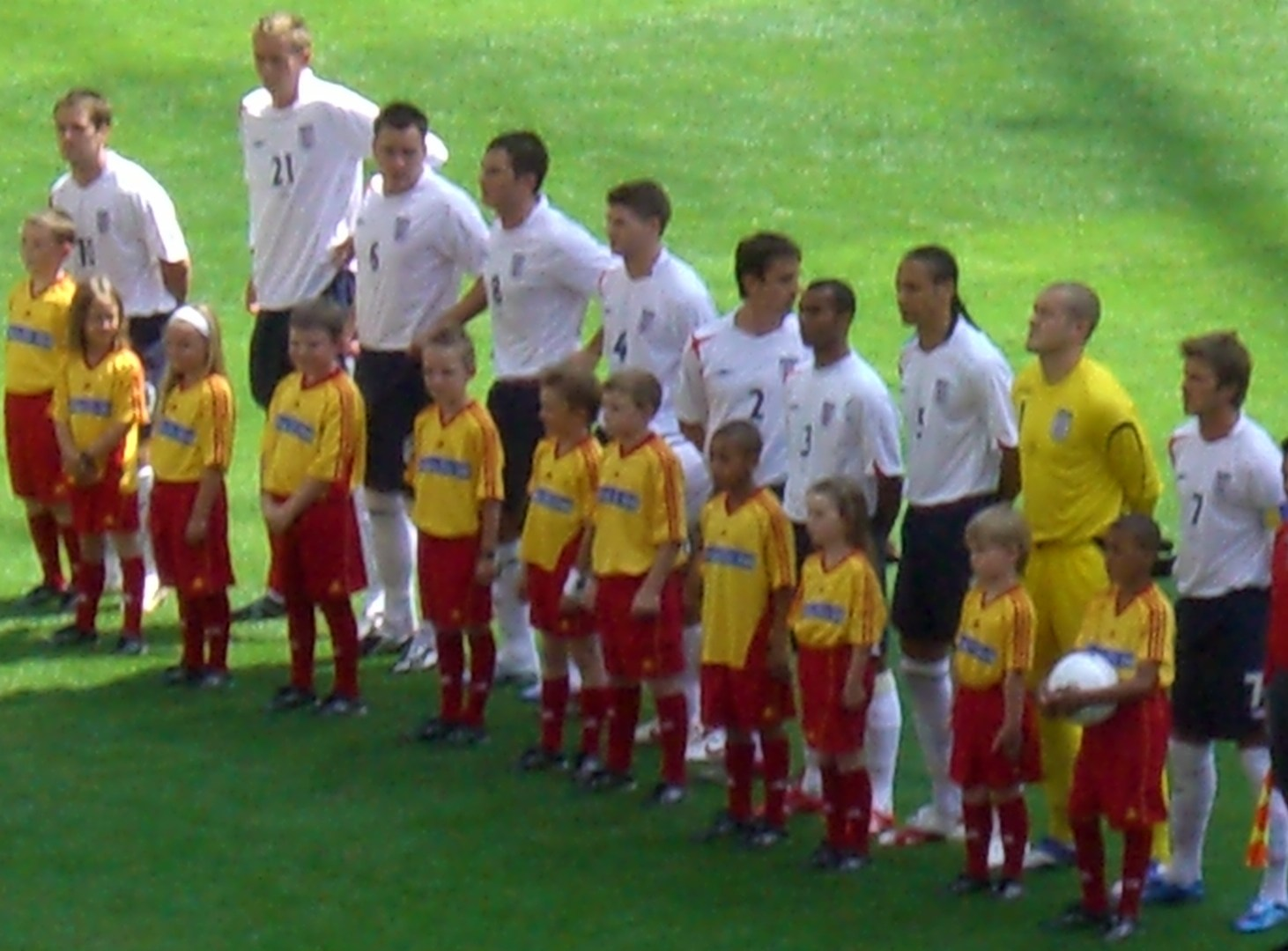
Robinson (wearing yellow; No.1) lining up for England at the 2006 FIFA World Cup

Between 1999 and 2002, Robinson made 14 appearances for the England under-21s. He was first included in the full international squad by Peter Taylor in a friendly against Italy on 15 November 2000, where he was an unused substitute. His next appearance on the England bench came two years later, under new manager Sven-Göran Eriksson, who selected him for a friendly match against Portugal on 7 September 2002, where he once again remained an unused substitute. He won his first cap in a 3–1 defeat against Australia on 12 February 2003, a match notable for the entire England team being substituted at half-time (at which point Robinson was brought on in place of David James). He won three more caps that year, all in friendlies, and on all occasions he was brought on at half-time. He made his first international start in a 6–1 victory over Iceland on 5 June 2004, with the match being England's final match before the UEFA Euro 2004 finals. Robinson was part of England's Euro 2004 squad, selected as an understudy to David James, although he made no appearances in the tournament.

Although David James remained as England's starting goalkeeper in a 2–2 draw against Austria in the first 2006 FIFA World Cup qualification match, Robinson started every subsequent match, keeping six clean sheets in nine competitive appearances, with a further three in seven friendly matches before the tournament. At the World Cup finals in Germany, Robinson was named in England's World Cup squad and was ever-present in England's campaign, keeping clean sheets in four out of five matches that he played. After the opening World Cup match against Paraguay, when his counterpart Justo Villar was injured seven minutes into the match, Robinson sent Villar his gloves as a gesture of goodwill. England had won the match 1–0. In addition to the clean sheet against Paraguay, he kept one in the group match against Trinidad and Tobago, although he drew criticism for making errors on crosses. Following England's progression from the group stage, he kept a clean sheet against Ecuador in the last 16. He also kept a clean sheet in the following match, a quarter-final match against Portugal, although Portugal won 3–1 in a penalty shoot-out to eliminate England from the tournament.

Robinson remained the number one goalkeeper for the start of England's UEFA Euro 2008 qualification campaign, and kept clean sheets in England's three opening matches (as well as one in a friendly against Greece). On 11 October 2006, during a Euro 2008 qualifier against Croatia, an unexpected bobble on a backpass from Gary Neville caused Robinson to miss the ball as he tried to clear it out of the penalty area, resulting in an own goal that put Croatia 2–0 up, with Robinson describing the incident as "a freak goal" following the match. This was the first time he had conceded a goal in six international appearances (and 655 minutes of international football); had he kept a clean sheet in this match, Robinson would have equalled Gordon Banks' record of seven consecutive clean sheets for England. He remained in the starting lineup for the friendly match against the Netherlands, which finished in a 1–1 draw. He also kept his place in the team for the next three international qualifiers, keeping a clean sheet in all three, while also featuring in a 1–1 draw with Brazil.

On 22 August 2007, Robinson made a mistake that resulted in Germany scoring their first goal of the match. England lost the match 2–1 for their first loss at the new Wembley Stadium. He was substituted at half-time and replaced by David James, although then England manager Steve McClaren said he planned to make this substitution before the match. Despite this error, Robinson was still the number one goalkeeper, featuring in four further European Championship qualifiers, and keeping a clean sheet in three of them. He made another mistake, however, in a 2–1 defeat against Russia: Robinson palmed a shot into the path of Russian forward Roman Pavlyuchenko, resulting in the striker scoring Russia's winning goal. As a result, McClaren dropped Robinson for the final qualifying match against Croatia in November, replacing him with Scott Carson. England failed to qualify for the Euro 2008 finals as they lost 3–2 in their final match against Croatia; Carson made an error from a Niko Kranjčar shot for the first goal.

Robinson did not feature in new manager Fabio Capello's plans until a friendly match against France on 26 March 2008, where he was named as a substitute. He remained on the substitute's bench for the start of the 2010 FIFA World Cup qualification campaign, but was dropped from the team altogether after a friendly against Germany on 19 November 2008. Robinson was recalled to the England squad in 2009 for the World Cup qualification matches against Kazakhstan and Andorra, as regular goalkeeper David James and back-up Ben Foster were unavailable due to injury. He remained a substitute in both matches, as well as for England's next two friendlies. He was dropped from the bench for England's 5–1 victory over Croatia on 9 September 2009, and withdrew from the squad with a hip injury before the next qualifiers against Ukraine and Belarus.

Blackburn manager Sam Allardyce said in April 2010 that Robinson should be the number one goalkeeper for England again due to his impressive club form; however, Robinson failed to make the England squad for the 2010 World Cup in South Africa, with Joe Hart, David James and Robert Green being selected instead, a decision which prompted criticism from both Allardyce, who stated, "[Fabio Capello] has made the biggest mistake of his selection process," and Gordon Banks, who stated, "Blackburn picked up halfway through the season but even when Robinson was letting goals in, they weren't necessarily his fault. [Robinson] could still be doing his job properly and Blackburn could still be losing. For me he should definitely have been included."

On 8 August 2010, Robinson retired from international football with immediate effect, despite having been selected for a friendly against Hungary. He said about his retirement, "Only now have I been able to make this decision as previously I haven't been in contention for selection, I don't see myself as a number three or four keeper and find that role very frustrating," while Allardyce backed his decision, stating, "As my player, I support him because I see him week in, week out and know how well he has performed. It's a big decision he's made, but I understand it." In his international career, Robinson had won 41 caps for England, 25 of which came in competitive international matches (either the qualification or final rounds of the FIFA World Cup and the UEFA European Championship). Despite Steve Kean stating that England should recall him in March 2012, Robinson stated that he had no interest in a return later that month. In February 2014, Robinson said that he would be open to an international return for the 2014 FIFA World Cup if England manager Roy Hodgson decided to recall him.

== Style of play ==
Considered by several pundits, players, and managers to be one of England's and the Premier League's best goalkeepers in his prime, Robinson was a commanding goalkeeper, who was mainly known for his shot-stopping, reflexes, agility, and ability to make acrobatic and decisive saves in his prime; he also generally had a good positional sense, although it was occasionally brought into question by pundits throughout his career. However, he also came under criticism in the media for lacking composure and being prone to errors on occasion, and was accused by certain pundits of not always being effective at dealing with long–range shots. While he was not known for being particularly accurate in his distribution, he was also known for his powerful and deep goal kicks.

== Personal life ==
Robinson attended Beverley Grammar School as a child. He has a daughter and two sons.

== Career statistics ==
=== Club ===
Appearances and goals by club, season and competition
Club	Season	League			FA Cup		League Cup		Europe		Total	
Club	Season	Division	Apps	Goals	Apps	Goals	Apps	Goals	Apps	Goals	Apps	Goals
Leeds United	1997–98	Premier League	0	0	0	0	0	0	—		0	0
Leeds United	1998–99	Premier League	5	0	0	0	1	0	0	0	6	0
Leeds United	1999–2000	Premier League	0	0	0	0	0	0	0	0	0	0
Leeds United	2000–01	Premier League	16	0	1	0	1	0	6 (Note: Appearances in UEFA Champions League)	0	24	0
Leeds United	2001–02	Premier League	0	0	0	0	0	0	0	0	0	0
Leeds United	2002–03	Premier League	38	0	5	0	1	0	6 (Note: Appearances in UEFA Cup)	0	50	0
Leeds United	2003–04	Premier League	36	0	1	0	2	1	—		39	1
Leeds United	Total		95	0	7	0	5	1	12	0	119	1
Tottenham Hotspur	2004–05	Premier League	36	0	6	0	2	0	—		44	0
Tottenham Hotspur	2005–06	Premier League	38	0	1	0	1	0	—		40	0
Tottenham Hotspur	2006–07	Premier League	38	1	4	0	3	0	9	0	54	1
Tottenham Hotspur	2007–08	Premier League	25	0	1	0	4	0	7	0	37	0
Tottenham Hotspur	Total		137	1	12	0	10	0	16	0	175	1
Blackburn Rovers	2008–09	Premier League	35	0	3	0	3	0	—		41	0
Blackburn Rovers	2009–10	Premier League	35	0	0	0	3	0	—		38	0
Blackburn Rovers	2010–11	Premier League	36	0	1	0	0	0	—		37	0
Blackburn Rovers	2011–12	Premier League	34	0	0	0	0	0	—		34	0
Blackburn Rovers	2012–13	Championship	21	0	0	0	0	0	—		21	0
Blackburn Rovers	2013–14	Championship	21	0	2	0	0	0	—		23	0
Blackburn Rovers	2014–15	Championship	7	0	0	0	0	0	—		7	0
Blackburn Rovers	Total		189	0	6	0	6	0	—		201	0
Burnley	2015–16	Championship	0	0	0	0	—		—		0	0
Burnley	2016–17	Premier League	3	0	0	0	0	0	—		3	0
Burnley	Total		3	0	0	0	0	0	—		3	0
Career total			424	1	25	0	21	1	28	0	498	2

=== International ===
Appearances and goals by national team and year
National team	Year	Apps	Goals
England	2002	0	0
England	2003	4	0
England	2004	5	0
England	2005	9	0
England	2006	14	0
England	2007	9	0
England	2008	0	0
England	2009	0	0
Total		41	0

== Honours ==
Leeds United

- FA Youth Cup: 1996–97

Tottenham Hotspur

- Football League Cup: 2007–08

Individual

- Premier League Player of the Month: November 2000
- Leeds United Player of the Year: 2002–03
- Blackburn Rovers Player of the Year: 2010–11
