= Ben Marshall (footballer) =

English footballer (born 1991)

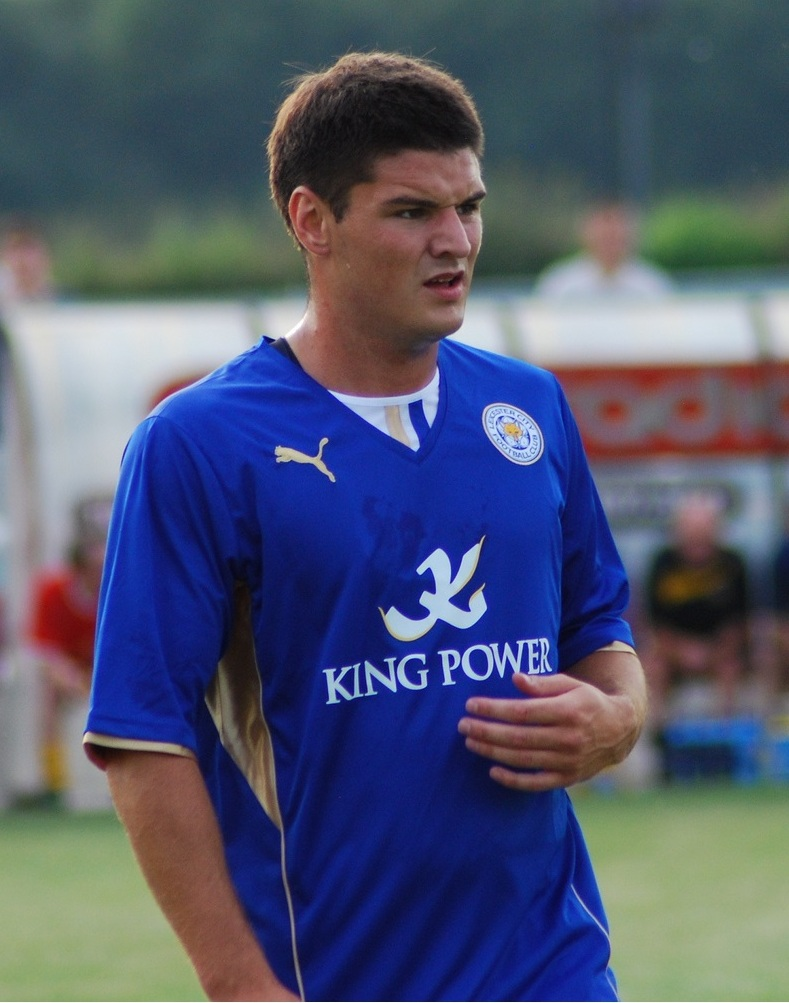
- Marshall playing for Leicester City in 2013

Personal information
- Full name: Ben Marshall
- Date of birth: 29 March 1991 (age 35)
- Place of birth: Salford, England
- Height: 6 ft 0 in (1.83 m)
- Positions: Winger; right back

Youth career
- 1997–2005: Manchester United
- 2005–2009: Crewe Alexandra

Senior career*
Years	Team	Apps	(Gls)
2009–2012	Stoke City	0	(0)
2009	→ Northampton Town (loan)	15	(2)
2009	→ Cheltenham Town (loan)	6	(2)
2010–2011	→ Carlisle United (loan)	53	(6)
2011–2012	→ Sheffield Wednesday (loan)	22	(5)
2012–2013	Leicester City	56	(7)
2013–2017	Blackburn Rovers	126	(11)
2017–2018	Wolverhampton Wanderers	22	(2)
2018	→ Millwall (loan)	16	(3)
2018–2019	Norwich City	4	(0)
2019	→ Millwall (loan)	16	(1)
2019–2022	Stoneclough		
2023–2024	Darwen		
2024	City of Stoke FC		
2026–	Abbey Hulton United		

International career
2012	England U21	2	(0)
- * Club domestic league appearances and goals

Ben Marshall (born 29 March 1991) is an English footballer who played as a winger or right back.

Born in Salford, Marshall began his career as a youth player with Manchester United. He joined Crewe Alexandra in 2003. He went professional in 2009, with Stoke City, but struggled to break into the first team and went on loan to four clubs. In 2012, he joined Leicester City on a permanent transfer. After one season with Leicester, he moved to Blackburn Rovers in 2013. After 3 1/2 seasons with Blackburn, he signed for Wolverhampton Wanderers in January 2017. He later played for Championship club Norwich City and Millwall.

== Club career ==
=== Early career ===
Ben Marshall started his career in Manchester United's academy as a seven-year-old in 1997. He remained there until 2005, when he joined Dario Gradi at Crewe Alexandra's academy. He spent a total of four years at Crewe Alexandra.

=== Stoke City ===
Marshall signed for Stoke City on 8 July 2009 along with fellow youngster Matthew Lund from Crewe, both having come through the youth system at the Alexandra Stadium.

==== Northampton Town (loan) ====
After an impressive pre-season for Stoke, he joined Northampton Town on loan for three months on 7 August to gain some first team experience and he earned praise from Cobblers boss Stuart Gray. Marshall returned to Stoke on 4 November 2009.

==== Cheltenham Town (loan) ====
On 13 November 2009, Marshall was sent on a month's loan with Cheltenham Town. He made his debut on 14 November 2009 in a 1–1 draw with Lincoln City.

==== Carlisle United (loan) ====
On 1 February 2010, Marshall moved on loan to League One side Carlisle United. He made his debut for the Cumbrians in a 2–1 defeat to Colchester United. He played 20 games and scored three goals for Carlisle.

He returned to Carlisle on a six-month loan on 31 August 2010. Marshall stated that he was 'excited' about rejoining Carlisle United on loan. His loan was then extended until the end of the season. His performances earned the praise of Carlisle manager Greg Abbott. He won the Football League Trophy with United, playing 23 minutes of the final against Brentford before being injured by Adam Reed. The tackle by Reed resulted in a broken leg for Marshall.

==== Sheffield Wednesday (loan) ====
Following his return from injury, Marshall joined Sheffield Wednesday on a five-month loan. Wednesday manager Gary Megson stated that he wanted to try and sign Marshall on a permanent basis. Marshall, however, failed to sign the contract before the end of his loan spell and so returned to Stoke. Marshall was offered a new three-year contract with Stoke in December 2011. He rejected this contract offer and joined Leicester City.

=== Leicester City ===
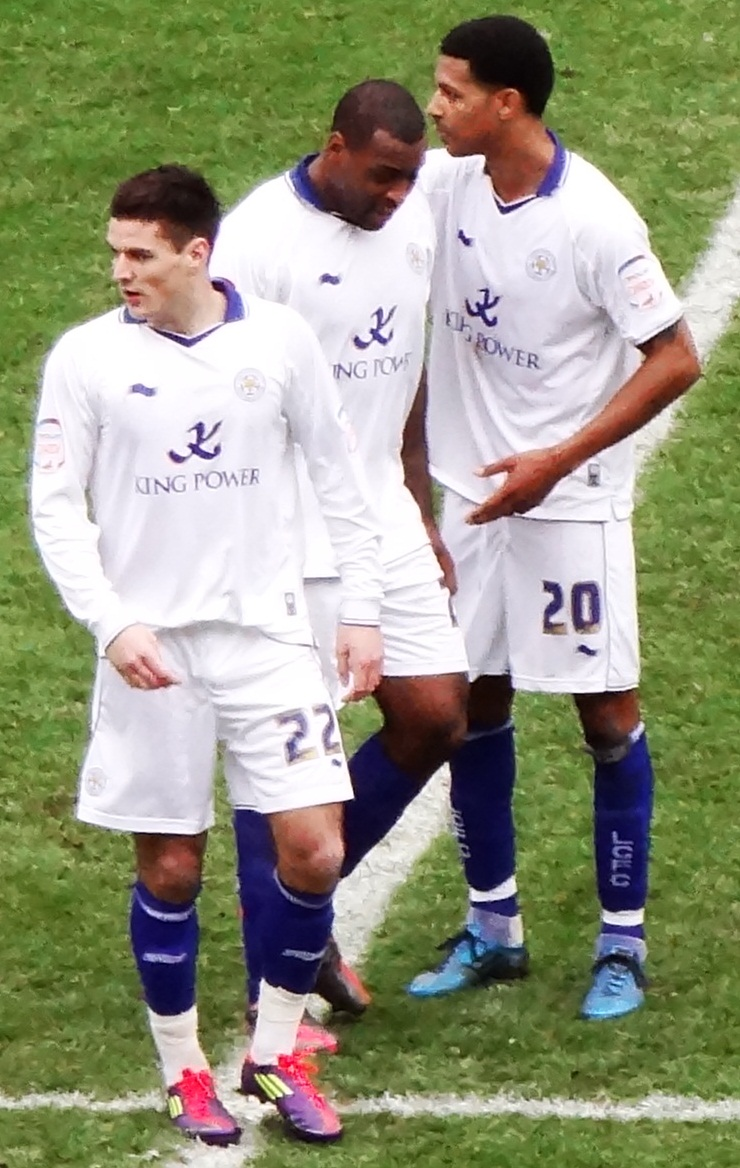
Marshall (left) in action for Leicester in March 2012.

Marshall joined Leicester on 31 January 2012 for a fee of £750,000, possibly rising to £1 million based on promotion and appearance clauses. He scored his first competitive goal for the club in a 5–2 FA Cup quarter-final defeat to Chelsea on 18 March 2012 and scored his first league goal six days later against Hull City. Marshall's fine form continued with goals in both of Leicester's victories over the Easter weekend against Doncaster Rovers and Ipswich Town.

Marshall scored his first goal of the 2012–13 season in a 1–0 home win over Blackpool.

=== Blackburn Rovers ===
It was announced on 28 August 2013 that Marshall had signed for Blackburn Rovers on a four-year deal. He scored his first goal for the club on 14 December 2013 in a 3–2 home victory against Millwall. Marshall had just started to establish himself as starter for the club, putting in a number of impressive displays, when he suffered an ankle ligament injury in a game against Derby County on 25 January 2013. Scans revealed that Marshall would be ruled out for several months and was therefore likely to miss the remainder of the season.

On 26 September 2016, after bids from Fulham and Wolves had been turned down over the summer, Marshall was offered a new contract by Blackburn, with his deal at the time set to expire at the end of the season. Marshall, however, turned the contract down and was made unavailable for the first team by then Blackburn manager Owen Coyle on 19 January 2017, following another bid by Wolves. His last appearance for the club came in a 3–2 defeat at Ipswich Town on 14 January 2017.

=== Wolverhampton Wanderers ===
On 31 January 2017 Marshall signed for fellow Championship side Wolverhampton Wanderers on a three-and-a-half-year deal for an undisclosed fee, reported to be around £1.2m. Marshall was reunited with his former manager Paul Lambert, who had managed him at Blackburn during the 2015–16 season.

Marshall's Wolves debut came on 4 February 2017 in a 2–1 loss against Burton Albion at the Pirelli Stadium, coming off the bench for Andreas Weimann in the 80th minute. Marshall was revealed to have been assigned the shirt number 64. Marshall made his first start and home debut for the club in a 1–0 home defeat by Wigan Athletic. His first Wolves goal came on 4 March 2017 at Reading in a 2–1 loss. On 17 April 2017, Marshall provided the assist for Nouha Dicko in a 1–0 away win at Leeds United that mathematically secured Wolves' Championship status.

==== Millwall (loan) ====
On 31 January 2018, Marshall joined fellow Championship side Millwall on loan until the end of the 2017–18 season. He scored his first goal for Millwall in a 1–0 win at Burton Albion on 24 February 2018.

=== Norwich City ===
Marshall signed for Championship club Norwich City on 30 June 2018 on a four-year contract for an undisclosed fee. He left Norwich on 27 July 2019, after his contract was cancelled by mutual consent.

=== Stoneclough ===
In October 2019, Marshall signed for West Lancashire Division One side Stoneclough in a bid to help the 12th tier side push for promotion. Stoneclough did not reveal the signing until 19 January 2020 when they announced on Twitter that he had joined the club. In the summer of 2020, Marshall signed a new contract with Stoneclough for one further season.

=== Abbey Hulton United ===
On 27th July 2026, Marshall signed for Midland Premier League club Abbey Hulton United.

== International career ==
Marshall made his debut for the England U21s in a European U21 Championship qualifier against Azerbaijan at the Dalga Arena, coming on as a 61st-minute substitute for Wilfried Zaha. England went on to win the game 2–0.

== Personal life ==
In May 2026, it was reported that Marshall had lost his footballer fortunes though poor financial decisions and was spared jail after going on a drunken vandalism spree in an antique shop in Newport, Shropshire.

== Career statistics ==
As of 5 May 2019

Club statistics
Club	Season	League			FA Cup		League Cup		Other		Total	
Club	Season	Division	Apps	Goals	Apps	Goals	Apps	Goals	Apps	Goals	Apps	Goals
Stoke City	2009–10	Premier League	0	0	0	0	0	0	0	0	0	0
Stoke City	2010–11	Premier League	0	0	0	0	0	0	0	0	0	0
Stoke City	2011–12	Premier League	0	0	0	0	0	0	0	0	0	0
Stoke City	Total		0	0	0	0	0	0	0	0	0	0
Northampton Town (loan)	2009–10	League Two	15	2	0	0	1	0	2 (Note: Appearances in Football League Trophy)	0	18	2
Cheltenham Town (loan)	2009–10	League Two	6	2	0	0	0	0	0	0	6	2
Carlisle United (loan)	2009–10	League One	20	3	0	0	0	0	0	0	20	3
Carlisle United (loan)	2010–11	League One	33	3	3	0	0	0	6	2	42	5
Carlisle United (loan)	Total		53	6	3	0	0	0	6	2	62	8
Sheffield Wednesday (loan)	2011–12	League One	22	5	0	0	0	0	0	0	22	5
Leicester City	2011–12	Championship	16	3	2	1	0	0	—		18	4
Leicester City	2012–13	Championship	40	4	2	0	1	1	0	0	43	5
Leicester City	Total		56	7	4	1	1	1	0	0	61	9
Blackburn Rovers	2013–14	Championship	18	2	2	0	0	0	—		20	2
Blackburn Rovers	2014–15	Championship	42	6	4	0	1	0	—		47	7
Blackburn Rovers	2015–16	Championship	44	2	3	4	1	0	—		48	6
Blackburn Rovers	2016–17	Championship	22	1	1	0	2	0	—		25	1
Blackburn Rovers	Total		126	11	10	4	4	0	—		140	16
Wolverhampton Wanderers	2016–17	Championship	16	2	0	0	0	0	0	0	16	2
Wolverhampton Wanderers	2017–18	Championship	6	0	0	0	3	0	0	0	9	0
Wolverhampton Wanderers	Total		22	2	0	0	3	0	—		25	2
Millwall (loan)	2017–18	Championship	16	3	0	0	1	0	0	0	16	3
Norwich City	2018–19	Championship	4	0	1	0	1	0	0	0	6	0
Norwich City	Total		4	0	1	0	1	0	—		6	0
Millwall (loan)	2018–19	Championship	16	1	0	0	0	0	0	0	16	1
Career total			336	39	18	6	10	1	8	2	372	48

== Honours ==
Carlisle United

- Football League Trophy: 2010–11

Individual

- Blackburn Rovers Player of the Season: 2014–15
