= Matthew Urwin =

English footballer (born 1993)

Personal information
- Date of birth: 28 November 1993 (age 32)
- Place of birth: Blackpool, England
- Height: 1.85 m (6 ft 1 in)
- Position: Goalkeeper

Team information
- Current team: Spennymoor Town

Youth career
- 2002–2012: Blackburn Rovers

Senior career*
Years	Team	Apps	(Gls)
2012–2014	Blackburn Rovers	0	(0)
2012	→ Taunton Town (loan)	3	(0)
2013	→ Stalybridge Celtic (loan)	16	(0)
2014–2015	Bradford City	0	(0)
2015–2016	AFC Fylde	13	(0)
2016–2019	Fleetwood Town	0	(0)
2017	→ Telford United (loan)	3	(0)
2017–2018	→ Chorley (loan)	44	(0)
2018–2019	→ Chorley (loan)	22	(0)
2019–2026	Chorley	273	(0)
2026	Chorley	0	(0)
2026–	Spennymoor Town	0	(0)
- * Club domestic league appearances and goals as of 16:41, 30 April 2026 (UTC)

Matthew Urwin (born 28 November 1993) is an English footballer who plays as a goalkeeper for National League North club Spennymoor Town.

== Playing career ==
=== Blackburn Rovers ===
Born in Blackpool, Urwin began his career with Blackburn Rovers, featuring in both legs of the club's 4–1 aggregate loss to Chelsea in the 2011–12 FA Youth Cup final. In late 2012, he was sent on a month-long youth loan to Taunton Town. At the conclusion of the 2012–13 season, Urwin was one of a number of young players offered a new deal, which he confirmed on Twitter that he had signed. The following season he was loaned to Conference North side Stalybridge Celtic, where he impressed, making seventeen appearances. Urwin was released at the conclusion of the 2013–14 season, following the expiration of his contract.

=== Bradford City ===
Following his release by Blackburn, Urwin went on to join Bradford City; initially signing on non-contract terms in August 2014, he extended his deal until the end of the season the following month. During his time with the club, he was on the bench for Bradford's famous win against Premier League side Chelsea in the FA Cup, but would remain the back-up goalkeeper to both Jordan Pickford and Ben Williams. He was named as a substitute in Bradford City's 2–0 EFL Cup loss to MK Dons, with a number of sources, including the BBC, reporting that he replaced Mason Bennett in the second half. However, it was actually Mark Yeates who replaced Bennett.

=== Fleetwood Town ===
Having been released by Bradford City at the conclusion of the 2014–15 season, Urwin joined National League North side AFC Fylde, where he spent one season before moving to League One side Fleetwood Town. He featured briefly for the club's development squad, even captaining the side, before being loaned to National League North side Telford United in early 2017. However, less than a month after joining, he suffered an injury to his hip, and returned to Fleetwood Town.

=== Chorley ===
Unable to break into the Fleetwood Town first team, making nine appearances on the bench towards the end of the 2016–17 season, Urwin was loaned to National League North side Chorley in August 2017. Following Chorley's 4–3 win against Boston United in the fourth qualifying round of the 2017–18 FA Cup, the club were drawn against Fleetwood Town in the first round proper. Urwin, alongside fellow loanee Nick Haughton, were unable to play against their parent club, with Chorley issuing a mock-plea for players to join the club at short notice to replace the pair.

Having been named Chorley's young player of the year, he returned to Fleetwood Town, where he was tipped to potentially challenge for the first-choice goalkeeper role. However, he returned to Chorley on another year-long loan in August 2018. In Chorley's FA Cup first round game against Doncaster Rovers, Urwin helped his side to an unexpected 2–2 draw, forcing a replay, and earned praise from Doncaster Rovers manager Grant McCann, who stated "I thought the keeper was outstanding for Chorley. I'm going to find out what his contract details are because he was outstanding."

In January 2019, having impressed while on loan, Urwin joined Chorley on a permanent basis, having mutually agreed to the termination of his contract with Fleetwood Town. Having established himself as Chorley's first-choice goalkeeper, Urwin was involved in the club's 2020–21 FA Cup run, where he helped his side to famous wins over League One sides Wigan Athletic and Peterborough United, before taking advantage of Championship side Derby County's COVID-19-hit squad to win 2–0 in the third round. However, he could not help his side past Premier League opposition Wolverhampton Wanderers, who ran out 1–0 victors courtesy of a goal from Vitinha in the fourth round tie. Urwin signed a contract extension with the club in May 2021.

In April 2026, Urwin announced he would be leaving Chorley at the end of the season to take up a full time coaching position at Blackburn. Across nine seasons, Urwin made 384 appearances for the Magpies and captained the side for the final three seasons of his Chorley career.

== Coaching career ==
While playing, Urwin took up a position in Blackpool's academy as a goalkeeping coach. In April 2026, he moved to Blackburn Rovers to take up the position as Senior Academy Goalkeeping Coach.

He rejoined Chorley as a goalkeeping coach on August 13 2026.

When he joined Spennymoor Town as a player, the club said that his job situation had changed. He joined the club on 7 September 2026.

== Career statistics ==
As of 7 June 2019

Appearances and goals by club, season and competition
Club	Season	League			FA Cup		EFL Cup		Other		Total	
Club	Season	Division	Apps	Goals	Apps	Goals	Apps	Goals	Apps	Goals	Apps	Goals
Blackburn Rovers	2013–14	Championship	0	0	0	0	0	0	0	0	0	0
Stalybridge Celtic (loan)	2013–14	Conference North	16	0	0	0	–		1 (Note: Appearances in the FA Trophy)	0	17	0
Bradford City	2014–15	League One	0	0	0	0	0	0	0	0	0	0
AFC Fylde	2015–16	National League North	13	0	2	0	–		3	0	18	0
Fleetwood Town	2016–17	League One	0	0	0	0	0	0	0	0	0	0
Fleetwood Town	2017–18	League One	0	0	0	0	0	0	0	0	0	0
Fleetwood Town	2018–19	League One	0	0	0	0	0	0	0	0	0	0
Fleetwood Town	Total		0	0	0	0	0	0	0	0	0	0
Chorley (loan)	2017–18	National League North	44	0	2	0	–		1	0	47	0
Chorley (loan)	2018–19	National League North	22	0	3	0	–		0	0	25	0
Chorley (loan)	Total		66	0	5	0	0	0	1	0	72	0
Chorley	2018–19	National League North	16	0	0	0	–		0	0	16	0
Career total			111	0	7	0	0	0	5	0	123	0
