= 2012–13 Blackburn Rovers F.C. season =

Blackburn Rovers
2012–13 season
- Chairman: Venky's
- Manager: Steve Kean (resigned); Eric Black (caretaker) Henning Berg (sacked); Gary Bowyer (caretaker) Michael Appleton (sacked); Gary Bowyer (caretaker)
- Ground: Ewood Park
- Championship: 17th
- FA Cup: Quarter-finals
- League Cup: Second round
- Top goalscorer: League: Jordan Rhodes (27); All: Jordan Rhodes (28)
- Highest home attendance: 20,735 vs Burnley (League, 17 March 2013)
- Lowest home attendance: 5,504 vs Bristol City (FA Cup, 5 January 2013)
- Average home league attendance: 14,998
Home colours	Away colours	Third colours

The 2012–13 season was Blackburn Rovers' 125th season as a professional football club. It was their first season back in the Football League Championship after an 11-year run in the Premier league English football.

== Summary ==
Despite relegation the new season began with the owners backing Steve Kean. There were many signings in the summer, the most notable one being the signing of Jordan Rhodes for £8 million. The fee was a record transfer for a championship team and shattered the previous transfer record.

Rovers started the season with four wins in the first six games. Their first defeat came in their seventh game against Middlesbrough at Ewood Park. Their performance in that game piled on intense pressure and speculation against Kean.

A week later, after Kean had travelled with the players to the capital on Friday for the game against Charlton, he attended a press conference in the afternoon, but news came at 7pm that he had resigned. Rumours suggested alleged outside interference. He described his position 'untenable' and no longer prepared to carry on as manager.

The sudden and unexpected nature of Kean's departure meant assistant manager Eric Black was the obvious choice for caretaker. Rovers started slowly under the temporary boss waiting four games before the first win. However, Rovers did manage to collect eight points and three clean sheets.

The search for a new manager took the Rovers board an entire month before finally opting for former Rovers defender Henning Berg. The choice of an out-of-work manager and football pundit for Norwegian TV surprised many who were calling for an experienced and a big name manager.

Berg's reign began with disappointment, his debut game against Crystal Palace marked the end of Blackburn's unbeaten away run. His solitary victory came at Peterborough; the same match saw Jordan Rhodes's first hat-trick for Rovers. Rovers were unlucky under Berg, especially against Huddersfield and Burnley when they succumbed to late equalisers. The team began to lack confidence and it showed in their results.

During Berg's ten games in charge Rovers lost six times, dropping from the play-offs spots to 17th place, the poor run of form forced the owners to sack the manager and the coaching staff a day later on Boxing Day.

After the sacking Reserve team coach Gary Bowyer and Youth coach Terry McPhillips took on the reigns and under caretaker management Rovers started brightly, helping Rovers gain a win over Barnsley which ended Rovers six match winless run, while their second win over Nottingham Forest ended an eleven-game run without a clean sheet. Rovers carried on the momentum into the FA cup with a win over Bristol City.

On Wednesday 9 January. Derek Shaw confirmed Rovers's interest in Blackpool manager Michael Appleton despite an announcement a week earlier from global adviser that a move for a new manager would be put on hold till the end of January. Just before Friday evening fixture Rovers named Michael Appleton as the manager. Bowyer's brief spell in charge remained unbeaten as they finished the game against Wolves with a draw.

Appleton took training on the Monday and wasted no time bring in his own staff, choosing Ashley Westwood as the assistant manager and John Keeley as goalkeeping coach. Appleton's tenure started badly with a loss to Charlton which wasn't a good spectacle. Rovers started slowly and the poor atmosphere partly blamed by the presence of the Venky's who had visited Ewood Park to watch the game. Rovers conceded first, but failed to establish control despite pulling a goal back from Jordan Rhodes, Charlton quickly retook the lead and the game finished 2–1 to the away team.

Michael Appleton's second game was much more encouraging, they were destined to win the game until a clumsy foul by substitute David Goodwillie after injury time resulted in a penalty, Brighton duly converted the penalty and snatched an unlikely draw in front of 12,230, lowest crowd at Ewood park in the league. At the third attempt, Rovers managed their first victory under Appleton with a conclusive 3–0 win over Derby County in the 4th round of the FA cup. Appleton's first win at Ewood Park occurred in the following match, 2–0 victory over Bristol City.

Appleton used the January transfer window as an opportunity to trim the squad, at least 10 players were either released or moved out on loan. Rovers missed out on the permanent transfer of DJ Campbell at the last minute, but managed to secure him on a loan agreement, later in February Man City youth defender Karim Rekik and former Rover David Bentley joined the squad. Rovers win over Ipswich saw Jordan Rhodes score for the seventh successive game, a record only achieved by four Rovers players. Rhodes could have extended the run to eight games if it were for the referee not awarding a penalty for a blatant handball by Brighton defender el-Abd.

In the next game Rovers produced one of the shocks of the FA cup with a 1–0 win over Arsenal, they came into the game as clear under-dogs and kept under sustained pressure throughout the game, but forward Kazim Richards strike on 72 minutes put Rovers into the lead, the team fought on to secure a famous victory at the Emirates for the first time.

Rovers experienced their first defeat in 7 outings in the following game against Hull. More defeats followed against Leicester, Peterborough and Bolton, the point they picked up in that period was a scoreless draw to Leeds. Rovers carried on the poor run of results into the FA cup losing out in a replay with Millwall. In the east Lancashire derby against Burnley, Rovers stole a point with a last gasp strike deep into stoppage time scored by David Dunn.

On 19 March 2013 after 67 days in charge of the club Michael Appleton was sacked as manager of the club. following the second sacking of the season Gary Bowyer resumed caretaker manager for the second time.

Rovers winless run extended to 11 games as they were beaten 3–0 at Cardiff before slipping to a 3–2 loss at Sheffield Wednesday. The Hillsborough defeat put Rovers in the Championship's bottom three and left fans with deep fears of a second successive relegation.

Many supporters were then left puzzled as Gary Bowyer was asked to travel to India with Paul Agnew and Derek Shaw to meet the owners ahead of a crucial home game against Derby. But Bowyer returned saying reassurances he had received from the owners would help the squad, and Rovers beat Derby 2–0 before following that up with victory over Huddersfield.

A 4–0 loss at Watford kept them in the mix but then followed a comeback triumph at Millwall that put Rovers five points away from the relegation zone with only two games left to play. A home draw against Crystal Palace then left them effectively safe.

But there remained issues off the field, with internal problems played out in court during Henning Berg's £2.25m claim against the club. Berg won the case, but before that Rovers' own lawyers admitted the club was 'out of control' and 'a shambles'.

They added that Shaw was operating without the authority of the owners and was subject to a disciplinary investigation over Berg's contract. Rovers finished the season in 17th place in the Championship after a 1–1 draw at Birmingham on the final day. Jordan Rhodes netted again but his tally of 29 league goals left him one behind Championship top scorer Glenn Murray, of Crystal Palace.

Rovers finished four points clear of the bottom three, but three points adrift of Burnley. Off the field Derek Shaw and secretary Ian Silvester travelled to India to meet the owners, but Shaw's future remained unclear after the talks. Both returned to England and went back to work as normal.

== Division stats ==
=== League table ===
Pos	Team	Pld	W	D	L	GF	GA	GD	Pts
15	Blackpool	46	14	17	15	62	63	−1	59
16	Middlesbrough	46	18	5	23	61	70	−9	59
17	Blackburn Rovers	46	14	16	16	55	62	−7	58
18	Sheffield Wednesday	46	16	10	20	53	61	−8	58
19	Huddersfield Town	46	15	13	18	53	73	−20	58

Updated to match(es) played on 4 May 2013. Source: BBC Sport
Rules for classification: 1) points; 2) goal difference; 3) number of goals scored.

=== Split table ===
Overall								Home						Away					
Pld	W	D	L	GF	GA	GD	Pts	W	D	L	GF	GA	GD	W	D	L	GF	GA	GD
46	14	16	16	55	62	−7	58	10	6	7	27	23	+4	4	10	9	28	39	−11

Last updated: 1 January 2013.
Source: BBC Football

== Fixtures and results ==
=== Pre-season friendlies ===
21 July 2012	Fleetwood Town	0–2	Blackburn Rovers	Accrington
12:00		Report	Mauro Formica 7'; Nuno Gomes 55'	Stadium: Crown Ground

21 July 2012	Blackburn Rovers	0–1	Accrington Stanley	Accrington
15:00		Report	Robinson 68' (o.g.)	Stadium: Crown Ground

25 July 2012	Rochdale	1–0	Blackburn Rovers	Rochdale
19:30	Hanley 75' (o.g.)	Report		Stadium: Spotland Stadium; Attendance: 1375

29 July 2012	Blackburn Rovers	2–1	AEK Athens	Fleetwood
14:00	Gomes 7'; Best 29'	Report	Kourellas 76'	Stadium: Highbury Stadium; Attendance: 994

3 August 2012	Go Ahead Eagles	4–2	Blackburn Rovers	Deventer
20:00			Goodwillie; Pedersen	Stadium: De Adelaarshorst

5 August 2012 *	N.E.C. Nijmegen	0–0	Blackburn Rovers	Nijmegen
14:30				Stadium: Stadion de Goffert; Attendance: 0 (BCD)

12 August 2012	Cork City	1–3	Blackburn Rovers	Cork
15:00	A. Connel 6'		Kazim-Richards 17', 51'; Pedersen 60'	Stadium: Turners Cross

- Pre-season game against N.E.C. on 5 August 2012 at Stadion de Goffert cancelled due to fan unrest. However behind closed doors training match played ending 0–0. It has since been confirmed Rovers fans were not involved and had been an issue with Dutch fans.

=== Championship ===
All results are from the BBC's website.

August

18 August 2012 1	Ipswich Town	1–1	Blackburn Rovers	Portman Road
15:00	Lowe 83' (o.g.)		Kazim-Richards 21'	Attendance: 19,117

22 August 2012 2	Blackburn Rovers	1–0	Hull City	Ewood Park
19:45	Kazim-Richards 77'			Attendance: 13,562

25 August 2012 3	Blackburn Rovers	2–1	Leicester City	Ewood Park
15:00	Nuno Gomes 33' Pedersen 79'		Vardy 55'	Attendance: 13,935

September

1 September 2012 4	Leeds United	3–3	Blackburn Rovers	Elland Road
15:00	Diouf 41'; McCormack 56'; Becchio 65'		Marcus Olsson 19'; Nuno Gomes 27'; Rochina 84'	Attendance: 24,411

15 September 2012 5	Bristol City	3–5	Blackburn Rovers	Ashton Gate Stadium
15:00	Adomah 1'; Stephen Pearson 69'; Baldock 83'		Rhodes 28', 90+5'; Nuno Gomes 55'; Rochina 81'; Dann 90'	Attendance: 14,657

18 September 2012 6	Blackburn Rovers	2–1	Barnsley	Ewood Park
19:45	Rhodes 45'; Nuno Gomes 85'		Mellis 32'	Attendance: 12,772

21 September 2012 7	Blackburn Rovers	1–2	Middlesbrough	Ewood Park
19:45	Hanley 89'		Jutkiewicz 7', 61'	Attendance: 13,405

29 September 2012 8	Charlton Athletic	1–1	Blackburn Rovers	The Valley
15:00	Jackson 27'		Etuhu 16'	Attendance: 17,169

October

3 October 2012 9	Nottingham Forest	0–0	Blackburn Rovers	City Ground
19:45				Attendance: 18,748

6 October 2012 10	Blackburn Rovers	0–1	Wolverhampton Wanderers	Ewood Park
15:00			Sako 78'	Attendance: 17,034

20 October 2012 11	Derby County	1–1	Blackburn Rovers	Pride Park Stadium
15:00	Robinson 88'		Rhodes 34'	Attendance: 22,958

24 October 2012 12	Blackburn Rovers	1–0	Sheffield Wednesday	Ewood Park
19:45	Hanley 5'			Attendance: 13,782

27 October 2012 13	Blackburn Rovers	1–0	Watford	Ewood Park
15:00	Rhodes 90+2'			Attendance: 13,233

November

3 November 2012 14	Crystal Palace	2–0	Blackburn Rovers	Selhurst Park
15:00	Murray 45+1', 65' (pen.)			Attendance: 16,744

6 November 2012 15	Huddersfield Town	2–2	Blackburn Rovers	John Smith's Stadium
19:45	Novak 15', 90+5'		Rhodes 43'; Murphy 55' (pen.)	Attendance: 14,597

10 November 2012 16	Blackburn Rovers	1–1	Birmingham City	Ewood Park
15:00	Rochina 13' (pen.)		King 17'	Attendance: 14,919

17 November 2012 17	Peterborough United	1–4	Blackburn Rovers	London Road Stadium
17:20	Tomlin 88'		Formica 3'; Rhodes 20', 39', 79'	Attendance: 5,997

24 November 2012 18	Blackburn Rovers	0–2	Millwall	Ewood Park
15:00			Wood 71'; Henry 90'	Attendance: 13,898

28 November 2012 19	Blackburn Rovers	1–2	Bolton Wanderers	Ewood Park
19:45	Rhodes 82'		Davies 2'; Lee 82'	Attendance: 18,010

December

2 December 2012 20	Burnley	1–1	Blackburn Rovers	Turf Moor
12:30	Vokes 89'		Rhodes 68'	Attendance: 21,341

7 December 2012 21	Blackburn Rovers	1–4	Cardiff City	Ewood Park
19:45	King 51'		Hudson 30'; Bellamy 55'; Mason 84'; Kim 85'	Attendance: 12,460

15 December 2012 22	Blackpool	2–0	Blackburn Rovers	Bloomfield Road
15:00	Thomas 22'; Broadfoot 81'			Attendance: 15,907

22 December 2012	Blackburn Rovers	P–P	Brighton & Hove Albion
match postponed due to waterlogged pitch

26 December 2012 23	Middlesbrough	1–0	Blackburn Rovers	Riverside Stadium
15:00	Jutkiewicz 67'			Attendance: 22,882

29 December 2012 24	Barnsley	1–3	Blackburn Rovers	Oakwell Stadium
15:00	Dawson 76'		King 29'; Rochina 44'; Rhodes 90+8'	Attendance: 9,153

January

1 January 2013 25	Blackburn Rovers	3–0	Nottingham Forest	Ewood Park
15:00	Rochina 48'; Rhodes 75'; Kazim-Richards 78'			Attendance: 15,490

11 January 2013 26	Wolverhampton Wanderers	1–1	Blackburn Rovers	Molineux Stadium
19:45	Johnson 74'		Rhodes 26' (pen.)	Attendance: 20,264

19 January 2013 27	Blackburn Rovers	1–2	Charlton Athletic	Ewood Park
15:00	Rhodes 48'		Stephens 26'; Kermorgant 64'	Attendance: 13,674

22 January 2013 28	Blackburn Rovers	1–1	Brighton & Hove Albion	Ewood Park
19:45	Rhodes 45' (pen.)		Lopez 90+7' (pen.)	Attendance: 12,230

26 January 2013	Brighton & Hove Albion	P–P	Blackburn Rovers
match postponed – fa cup tie vs Derby County

February

2 February 2013 29	Blackburn Rovers	2–0	Bristol City	Ewood Park
15:00	Rhodes 28', 65'			Attendance: 13,539

9 February 2013 30	Blackburn Rovers	1–0	Ipswich Town	Ewood Park
15:00	Rhodes 61'			Attendance: 14,342

12 February 2013 31	Brighton & Hove Albion	1–1	Blackburn Rovers	Amex Stadium
19:45	Vicente 57' (pen.)		Dann 24'	Attendance: 24,759

16 February 2013	Leicester City	P–P	Blackburn Rovers
match postponed – fa cup tie vs Arsenal

19 February 2013 32	Hull City	2–0	Blackburn Rovers	KC Stadium
19:45	Gedo 52'; Elmohamady 67'			Attendance: 15,981

23 February 2013 33	Blackburn Rovers	0–0	Leeds United	Ewood Park
15:00				Attendance: 18,467

26 February 2013 34	Leicester City	3–0	Blackburn Rovers	King Power Stadium
19:45	Wood 29'; Kane 42'; King 90'			Attendance: 19,561

March

2 March 2013 35	Blackburn Rovers	2–3	Peterborough United	Ewood Park
15:00	Rhodes 73'; Jones 90+2'		Gayle 11', 14', 27'	Attendance: 13,192

5 March 2013 36	Bolton Wanderers	1–0	Blackburn Rovers	Reebok Stadium
20:00	Eagles 90' (+3)

9 March 2013	Millwall	P–P	Blackburn Rovers
postponed – FA cup Sixth round tie

17 March 2013 37	Blackburn Rovers	1–1	Burnley	Ewood Park
12:30	Dunn 90+5'		Shackell 32'	Attendance: 20,735

29 March 2013 38	Blackburn Rovers	1–1	Blackpool	Ewood Park
15:00	Rhodes 79'		MacKenzie 65'	Attendance: 17,764

April

1 April 2013 39	Cardiff City	3–0	Blackburn Rovers	Cardiff City Stadium
15:00	Campbell 40'; Mason 86'; Whittingham 90+6' (pen.)			Attendance: 24,327

6 April 2013 40	Sheffield Wednesday	3–2	Blackburn Rovers	Hillsborough Stadium
15:00	Johnson 20', 78'; Lita 35'		Rhodes 12' (pen.); Dann 71'	Attendance: 24,660

13 April 2013 41	Blackburn Rovers	2–0	Derby County	Ewood Park
15:00	Rhodes 9' (pen.); Dann 45+3'			Attendance: 13,391

16 April 2013 42	Blackburn Rovers	1–0	Huddersfield Town	Ewood Park
19:45	Rhodes 37'			Attendance: 15,317

20 April 2013 43	Watford	4–0	Blackburn Rovers	Vicarage Road
15:00	Deeney 52', 61'; Abdi 67'; Briggs 75'			Attendance: 13,775

23 April 2013 44	Millwall	1–2	Blackburn Rovers	The Den
19:45	Osborne 14'		Jones 56'; Rhodes 78' (pen.)	Attendance: 8,607 (240 away)

27 April 2013 45	Blackburn Rovers	1–1	Crystal Palace	Ewood Park
15:00	Rhodes 42'		Dobbie 28'	Attendance: 19,796

May

4 May 2013 46	Birmingham City	1–1	Blackburn Rovers	St Andrew's
12:45	Morrison 42'		Rhodes 66'	Attendance: 18,979

==== Match by Match ====
Round	1	2	3	4	5	6	7	8	9	10	11	12	13	14	15	16	17	18	19	20	21	22	23	24	25	26	27	28	29	30	31	32	33	34	35	36	37	38	39	40	41	42	43	44	45	46
Ground	A	H	H	A	A	H	H	A	A	H	A	H	H	A	A	H	A	H	H	A	H	A	A	A	H	A	H	H	H	H	A	A	H	A	H	A	H	H	A	A	H	H	A	A	H	A
Result	D	W	W	D	W	W	L	D	D	L	D	W	W	L	D	D	W	L	L	D	L	L	L	W	W	D	L	D	W	W	D	L	D	L	L	L	D	D	L	L	W	W	L	W	D	D
Position	13	4	3	2	1	1	1	4	5	9	10	5	5	6	6	7	6	9	10	9	13	15	17	15	13	12	14	14	13	8	8	10	10	11	12	13	18	15	19	22	20	19	20	15	17	17

Updated to match(es) played on 2 December 2012. Source: Skysports
A = Away; H = Home; W = Win; D = Draw; L = Loss

=== Football League Cup ===
28 August 2012 2nd Round	Milton Keynes Dons	2–1	Blackburn Rovers	Stadium MK
19:45	Chadwick 52', 68'	Report	Goodwillie 83'	Attendance: 5,873; Referee: Mick Russell

=== FA Cup ===
5 January 2013 3rd Round	Blackburn Rovers	2–0	Bristol City	Ewood Park
15:00	Murphy 7'; Hanley 58'	Report		Attendance: 5,504 (450 away)

26 January 2013 4th Round	Derby County	0–3	Blackburn Rovers	Pride Park
15:00		Report	Kazim-Richards 44'; Dann 66'; Rhodes 71'	Attendance: 14,013 (1,287 away)

16 February 2013 5th Round	Arsenal	0–1	Blackburn Rovers	Emirates Stadium
15:00		Report	Kazim-Richards 72'	Attendance: 60,070 (1,400 away)

10 March 2013 6th Round	Millwall	0–0	Blackburn Rovers	The Den
14:00		Report		Attendance: 14,885 (1,744 away)

13 March 2013 6th Round (Replay)	Blackburn Rovers	0–1	Millwall	Ewood Park
19:30		Report	Shittu 42'	Attendance: 8,635 (574 away)

== Club ==
=== Technical staff ===
Position	Staff
Caretaker Manager	(England) Gary Bowyer
Caretaker Assistant Manager	(England) Terry McPhillips
Caretaker Reserves Manager	(Scotland) Colin Hendry
Goalkeeping Coach	(England) John Keeley
Youth Coach	(England) David Lowe

Last updated: March 2013

=== Medical staff ===
Position	Staff
Doctor	(Scotland) Duncan Robertson
Strength and conditioning coach	(England) Chris Neville
Youth team Doctor	(England) Chris Dalton
Physiotherapist	(England) Dave Fevre (England) Paul Kelly (England) Mark Palmer

Last updated: October 2011

== Squad statistics ==
=== Appearances and goals ===
As of 4 May 2013
52 games ~ 46 League games + 5 FA cup games + 1 League cup game

No.	Pos	Nat	Player	Total		Championship		FA Cup		League Cup	
No.	Pos	Nat	Player	Apps	Goals	Apps	Goals	Apps	Goals	Apps	Goals
1	GK	(England) ENG	Paul Robinson	21	0	21	0	0	0	0	0
2	DF	(England) ENG	Bradley Orr	22	0	18+1	0	1+1	0	1	0
4	DF	(Portugal) POR	Nuno Henrique	0	0	0	0	0	0	0	0
3	DF	(Sweden) SWE	Martin Olsson	33	0	27+2	0	4	0	0	0
5	DF	(France) FRA	Gaël Givet	16	0	15+1	0	0	0	0	0
6	MF	(England) ENG	Jason Lowe	42	0	31+5	0	5	0	0+1	0
7	MF	(Portugal) POR	Fabio Nunes	7	0	2+4	0	0	0	1	0
8	MF	(England) ENG	David Dunn	18	1	9+6	1	1+2	0	0	0
9	FW	(Republic of Ireland) IRL	Leon Best	8	0	4+2	0	2	0	0	0
10	MF	(Argentina) ARG	Mauro Formica (on loan at Palermo)	16	1	12+3	1	0	0	0+1	0
11	FW	(Scotland) SCO	Jordan Rhodes	47	28	41+1	27	5	1	0	0
12	MF	(Norway) NOR	Morten Gamst Pedersen	33	1	17+11	1	4+1	0	0	0
13	MF	(England) ENG	Danny Murphy	35	2	31+2	1	2	1	0	0
14	MF	(Sweden) SWE	Marcus Olsson	28	1	19+4	1	4	0	1	0
15	FW	(Norway) NOR	Joshua King	19	2	11+5	2	2+1	0	0	0
16	DF	(England) ENG	Scott Dann	52	5	46	4	5	1	1	0
17	MF	(England) ENG	Lee Williamson	10	0	9	0	1	0	0	0
17	MF	(Portugal) POR	Paulo Jorge (on loan at Beroe)	2	0	0+1	0	0	0	1	0
18	MF	(Nigeria) NGR	Dickson Etuhu	21	1	19+1	1	0	0	1	0
19	DF	(England) ENG	Todd Kane (on loan from Chelsea)	14	0	13+1	0	0	0	0	0
19	FW	(Portugal) POR	Edinho Júnior (on loan at Shillong Lajong)	2	0	1+0	0	0	0	1	0
21	FW	(Portugal) POR	Nuno Gomes	20	4	8+10	4	0+2	0	0	0
22	FW	(England) ENG	Anton Forrester	1	0	0	0	0+1	0	0	0
23	DF	(Netherlands) NED	Karim Rekik (on loan from Manchester City)	5	0	4+1	0	0	0	0	0
23	FW	(Spain) ESP	Rubén Rochina (on loan at Real Zaragoza)	22	5	11+8	5	1+1	0	1	0
24	DF	(England) ENG	Josh Morris	10	0	7+3	0	0	0	0	0
25	FW	(Scotland) SCO	David Goodwillie	10	1	2+6	0	0+1	0	0+1	1
26	MF	(England) ENG	Raheem Hanley	0	0	0	0	0	0	0	0
27	DF	(Wales) WAL	Adam Henley	17	0	13+2	0	2	0	0	0
29	GK	(Poland) POL	Grzegorz Sandomierski (on loan from Racing Genk)	8	0	7+1	0	0	0	0	0
30	GK	(Australia) AUS	Sebastian Usai	0	0	0	0	0	0	0	0
31	DF	(Scotland) SCO	Grant Hanley	44	3	35+4	2	4	1	1	0
32	MF	(England) ENG	Cameron Stewart (on loan from Hull City)	7	0	3+4	0	0	0	0	0
32	DF	(Brazil) BRA	Bruno Ribeiro (on loan at Clube Atlético Linense)	5	0	4+1	0	0	0	0	0
34	GK	(England) ENG	Jake Kean	24	0	18	0	5	0	1	0
35	MF	(England) ENG	David Bentley (on loan from Tottenham)	7	0	4+1	0	1+1	0	0	0
36	MF	(England) ENG	David Jones (on loan from Wigan)	12	2	11+1	2	0	0	0	0
37	MF	(England) ENG	Robbie Cotton	0	0	0	0	0	0	0	0
38	MF	(Portugal) POR	Diogo Rosado (on loan at Benfica)	3	0	1+1	0	0	0	1	0
39	FW	(Turkey) TUR	Colin Kazim-Richards (on loan from Galatasaray)	31	5	22+6	3	3	2	0	0
40	MF	(Spain) ESP	Hugo Fernadez	0	0	0	0	0	0	0	0
41	FW	(New Zealand) NZL	Tim Payne	0	0	0	0	0	0	0	0
42	DF	(England) ENG	Kellen Daly	0	0	0	0	0	0	0	0
43	DF	(England) ENG	Ryan Edwards (on loan at Fleetwood Town)	0	0	0	0	0	0	0	0
44	MF	(Republic of Ireland) IRL	John O'Sullivan	1	0	0+1	0	0	0	0	0
Players that played for Blackburn Rovers this season that have left the club:
10	FW	(England) ENG	DJ Campbell (on loan from Queens Park Rangers)	7	0	5+2	0	0	0	0	0
33	MF	(Montenegro) MNE	Simon Vukčević	11	0	4+5	0	0+1	0	1	0

=== Assists ===
As of 16 August 2014

Rank	No.	Pos.	Name	Championship	FA Cup	League Cup	Total
1	12	MF	(Norway) Morten Gamst Pedersen	7	0	0	7
2	16	DF	(England) Scott Dann	3	1	0	4
2	11	FW	(Scotland) Jordan Rhodes	4	0	0	4
4	7	MF	(Portugal) Fabio Nunes	2	0	1	3
4	13	MF	(England) Danny Murphy	2	1	0	3
4	39	FW	(Turkey) Colin Kazim-Richards	3	0	0	3
4	6	MF	(England) Jason Lowe	2	1	0	3
4	23	FW	(Spain) Rubén Rochina	3	0	0	3
9	8	MF	(England) David Dunn	2	0	0	2
9	10	MF	(Argentina) Mauro Formica	2	0	0	2
9	15	FW	(Norway) Joshua King	2	0	0	2
9	3	DF	(Sweden) Martin Olsson	1	1	0	2
9	21	FW	(Portugal) Nuno Gomes	2	0	0	2
9	14	MF	(Sweden) Marcus Olsson	1	1	0	2
15	27	DF	(Wales) Adam Henley	1	0	0	1
15	36	MF	(England) David Jones	1	0	0	1
15	18	MF	(Nigeria) Dickson Etuhu	1	0	0	1
15	19	DF	(England) Todd Kane	1	0	0	1
15	31	DF	(Scotland) Grant Hanley	1	0	0	1
15	25	FW	(Scotland) David Goodwillie	1	0	0	1
Total				42	5	1	48

=== Penalties ===
For (8)

Date	Penalty Taker	Scored	Opponent	Competition
27 Oct	Kazim-Richards	No (Hit crossbar)	Watford	Championship
6 Nov	Danny Murphy	Yes	Huddersfield Town	Championship
10 Nov	Ruben Rochina	Yes	Birmingham City	Championship
11 Jan	Jordan Rhodes	Yes	Wolves	Championship
22 Jan	Jordan Rhodes	Yes	Brighton	Championship
6 Apr	Jordan Rhodes	Yes	Sheffield Wednesday	Championship
13 Apr	Jordan Rhodes	Yes	Derby County	Championship
23 Apr	Jordan Rhodes	Yes	Millwall	Championship

Against (7)

Date	Penalty Taker	Scored	Opponent	Competition
29 Sep	Johnnie Jackson	No (Saved)	Charlton Athletic	Championship
3 Nov	Glenn Murray	Yes	Crystal Palace	Championship
3 Nov	Glenn Murray	No (Saved)	Crystal Palace	Championship
22 Jan	David López	Yes	Brighton	Championship
12 Feb	Vicenté	Yes	Brighton	Championship
1 Apr	Peter Whittingham	Yes	Cardiff City	Championship
6 Apr	Leroy Lita	Yes	Sheffield Wednesday	Championship

==== Managerial changes ====
Manager	Appointed	Matches	Departure	Date of vacancy	Position
(Scotland) Steve Kean		1–7	Resigned	28 September 2012	3rd
(Scotland) Eric Black	29 September 2012	8–13	Replaced	3 November 2012	5th
(Norway) Henning Berg	3 November 2012	14–23	Sacked	27 December 2012	17th
(England) Gary Bowyer	28 December 2012	24–26	Replaced	12 January 2013	12th
(England) Michael Appleton	12 January 2013	27–37	Sacked	19 March 2013	18th
(England) Gary Bowyer	20 March 2013	38–46			

== Transfers ==
=== Summer ===
==== In ====
Date	Pos.	Name	From	Fee	Source
25 June 2012	MF	(England) Danny Murphy	(England) Fulham	Free	
2 July 2012	FW	(Republic of Ireland) Leon Best	(England) Newcastle United	£3,000,000	
3 July 2012	FW	(Portugal) Nuno Gomes	(Portugal) Braga	Free	
4 July 2012	MF	(Portugal) Fabio Nunes	(Portugal) Portimonense	Undisclosed	
23 July 2012	MF	(Portugal) Paulo Jorge	(Portugal) Porto B	Undisclosed	
23 July 2012	FW	(Portugal) Edinho Júnior	(Portugal) Olhanense	Nominal fee	
3 August 2012	MF	(Nigeria) Dickson Etuhu	(England) Fulham	£1,500,000	
29 August 2012	FW	(Scotland) Jordan Rhodes	(England) Huddersfield Town	£8,000,000	
31 August 2012	MF	(Portugal) Diogo Rosado	(Portugal) Sporting Lisbon	Free	
31 August 2012	DF	(Portugal) Nuno Henrique	(Portugal) Académica	Nominal fee	

- Total spent ▼ ~ £12,500,000 + Undisclosed fees

==== Out ====
Date	Pos.	Name	To	Fee	Source
28 June 2012	FW	(Nigeria) Yakubu	(China) Guangzhou R&F	£1,000,000	
27 June 2012	FW	(Canada) Junior Hoilett	(England) Queens Park Rangers	Bosman (Undisclosed compensation; est ~£4,000,000)	
31 June 2012	DF	(Spain) Míchel Salgado	Released	Retired	
31 June 2012	MF	(Australia) Vince Grella	(Australia) Melbourne Heart	Free	
31 June 2012	FW	(England) Zac Aley	(England) Warrington Town	Free	
31 June 2012	DF	(Australia) Jamie Maclaren	Released	End of contract	
31 June 2012	MF	(France) Hérold Goulon	Released	End of contract	
30 July 2012	DF	(England) Matty Pearson	(England) Rochdale	Free	
31 July 2012	DF	(England) Jackson Ramm	(England) Colchester United	Free	
10 August 2012	FW	(England) Nick Blackman	(England) Sheffield United	Undisclosed	
22 August 2012	MF	(Serbia) Radosav Petrović	(Turkey) Gençlerbirliği	Undisclosed	
29 August 2012	GK	(England) Mark Bunn	(England) Norwich City	Undisclosed	
31 August 2012	MF	(France) Steven Nzonzi	(England) Stoke City	£3,000,000 (up to ~£4,000,000 with add-ons)	

- Total sold ▲ ~ £9,000,000 + Undisclosed fees

==== Loan in ====
Date	Pos.	Name	From	Loan length	Source
10 August 2012	FW	(Turkey) Colin Kazim-Richards	(Turkey) Galatasaray	Season-long loan	
31 August 2012	GK	(Poland) Grzegorz Sandomierski	(Belgium) Genk	Season-long loan	
21 November 2012	FW	(Norway) Joshua King	(England) Manchester United	1 Month loan	

==== Loan out ====
Date	Pos.	Name	To	Loan length	Source
2 July 2012	DF	(England) Ryan Edwards	(England) Rochdale	6-month loan	
8 August 2012	FW	(England) Jordan Slew	(England) Oldham Athletic	6-month loan	
14 August 2012	DF	(England) Myles Anderson	(England) Aldershot Town	1-month loan	
15 August 2012	DF	(Republic of Ireland) Anthony O'Connor	(England) Burton Albion	1-month loan	
31 August 2012	FW	(Scotland) David Goodwillie	(England) Crystal Palace	4 and a half month loan	
27 September 2012	FW	(England) Micah Evans	(England) Chesterfield	3-month loan	
25 October 2012	DF	(England) Josh Morris	(England) Rotherham United	1-month loan	
26 October 2012	FW	(Nigeria) Osayamen Osawe	(England) Accrington Stanley	1-month loan	
9 November 2012	GK	(France) Christopher Dilo	(England) Hyde	1-month loan	
14 November 2012	DF	(England) Bradley Orr	(England) Ipswich Town	3-month loan (until 26 January 2013)	
22 November 2012	DF	(England) Jack O'Connell	(England) Rotherham United	1-month loan	

=== January ===
==== In ====
Date	Pos.	Name	From	Fee	Source
2 January 2013	FW	(Norway) Joshua King	(England) Manchester United	Undisclosed	
30 January 2013	FW	(England) Anton Forrester	(England) Everton	Free transfer	
8 February 2013	MF	(England) Lee Williamson	Free agent	Free transfer	

- Total spent ▼ ~ Undisclosed fee

==== Out ====
Date	Pos.	Name	To	Fee	Source
4 January 2013	DF	(England) Myles Anderson	(England) Exeter City	Free	
30 January 2013	MF	(Algeria) Amine Linganzi	Released	Contract terminated by mutual consent	
31 January 2013	MF	(Montenegro) Simon Vukčević	Released	Contract terminated by mutual consent	

- Total sold ▲ ~ £0

==== Loan in ====
Date	Pos.	Name	From	Loan length	Source
9 January 2013	DF	(England) Todd Kane	(England) Chelsea	1 month youth loan	

==== Emergency Loans ====
Date	Pos.	Name	From	Loan length	Source
8 February 2013	FW	(England) DJ Campbell	(England) Queens Park Rangers	3-month loan	
15 February 2013	MF	(England) David Bentley	(England) Tottenham Hotspur	3-month loan	
15 February 2013	DF	(Netherlands) Karim Rekik	(England) Manchester City	3-month loan	
1 March 2013	MF	(England) Cameron Stewart	(England) Hull City	3-month loan	
2 March 2013	MF	(England) David Jones	(England) Wigan	3-month loan	
15 March 2013	DF	(England) Todd Kane	(England) Chelsea	1-month loan	

==== Loan out ====
Date	Pos.	Name	To	Loan length	Source
6 January 2013	DF	(Brazil) Bruno Ribeiro	(Brazil) Clube Atlético Linense	6-month loan	
12 January 2013	FW	(England) Curtis Haley	(England) Chorley	1-month loan	
14 January 2013	DF	(Republic of Ireland) Anthony O'Connor	(England) Burton Albion	6-month loan	
24 January 2013	CM	(Argentina) Mauro Formica	(Italy) Palermo	6-month loan	
24 January 2013	DF	(England) Jack O'Connell	(England) York City	1-month loan	
30 January 2013	GK	(France) Christopher Dilo	(England) Hyde	1-month loan	
30 January 2013	FW	(Nigeria) Osayamen Osawe	(England) Hyde	1-month loan	
31 January 2013	FW	(England) Jordan Slew	(England) Rotherham United	1-month loan	
31 January 2013	MF	(Portugal) Diogo Rosado	(Portugal) Benfica	5-month loan	
31 January 2013	FW	(England) Micah Evans	(England) Macclesfield Town	1-month loan	
31 January 2013	FW	(Spain) Rubén Rochina	(Spain) Real Zaragoza	5-month loan	
11 February 2013	MF	(Portugal) Paulo Jorge	(Bulgaria) Beroe Stara Zagora	4-month loan	
13 February 2013	FW	(Portugal) Edinho Júnior	(India) Shillong Lajong	4-month loan	
21 February 2013	DF	(England) Ryan Edwards	(England) Fleetwood Town	1-month loan	
