= List of English football transfers summer 2013 =

This is a list of English football transfers for the 2013 summer transfer window. Only moves featuring at least one Premier League or Championship club are listed.

The summer transfer window began once clubs had concluded their final domestic fixture of the 2012–13 season, but many transfers only officially went through on 1 July because the majority of player contracts finished on 30 June. The window remained open until 23:00 BST on 2 September 2013.

This list also includes transfers featuring at least one Premier League or Championship club which were completed after the end of the winter 2012–13 transfer window and before the end of the 2013 summer window.

Players without a club could join at any time, and clubs below Premier League level could sign players on loan during loan windows. Clubs could be permitted to sign a goalkeeper on an emergency loan if they had no registered goalkeeper available.

== Transfers ==
All players, and clubs without a flag are English. Note that while Cardiff City and Swansea City are affiliated with the Football Association of Wales and thus take the Welsh flag, they play in the English football league system, and so their transfers are included here.

Date	Name	Moving from	Moving to	Fee
1 February 2013	Lee Croft	Derby County	Oldham Athletic	Free
4 February 2013	Jide Maduako	Leicester City	Ilkeston	Loan
5 February 2013	Rohan Ince	Unattached	Brighton & Hove Albion	Free
8 February 2013	Benik Afobe	Arsenal	Millwall	Loan
8 February 2013	DJ Campbell	Queens Park Rangers	Blackburn Rovers	Loan
8 February 2013	John Cofie	Manchester United	Notts County	Loan
8 February 2013	(Iraq) Yaser Kasim	Brighton & Hove Albion	Macclesfield Town	Loan
8 February 2013	(France) Therry Racon	Millwall	Portsmouth	Loan
8 February 2013	Lee Williamson	Unattached	Blackburn Rovers	Free
9 February 2013	(Australia) Corey Gameiro	Fulham	(New Zealand) Wellington Phoenix	Loan
11 February 2013	(Sweden) Johan Hammar	Everton	Stockport County	Loan
11 February 2013	(Ivory Coast) Paulo Jorge	Blackburn Rovers	(Bulgaria) Beroe	Loan
11 February 2013	(Brazil) André Santos	Arsenal	(Brazil) Grêmio	Loan
12 February 2013	Carl Dickinson	Watford	Coventry City	Loan
12 February 2013	(Latvia) Kaspars Gorkšs	Reading	Wolverhampton Wanderers	Loan
12 February 2013	Danny Mayor	Sheffield Wednesday	Southend United	Loan
13 February 2013	Jacob Blyth	Leicester City	Notts County	Loan
13 February 2013	(Ivory Coast) Edinho Júnior	Blackburn Rovers	(India) Shillong Lajong	Loan
13 February 2013	Aiden O'Brien	Millwall	Crawley Town	Loan
13 February 2013	Dominic Poleon	Leeds United	Sheffield United	Loan
14 February 2013	(Republic of Ireland) Bradley Garmston	West Bromwich Albion	Colchester United	Loan
14 February 2013	(Japan) Tadanari Lee	Southampton	(Japan) Tokyo	Loan
14 February 2013	Michael Richardson	Newcastle United	Gillingham	Loan
14 February 2013	(Australia) Ryan Williams	Fulham	Gillingham	Loan
15 February 2013	David Bentley	Tottenham Hotspur	Blackburn Rovers	Loan
15 February 2013	Jonson Clarke-Harris	Peterborough United	Bury	Loan
15 February 2013	Brian Howard	Unattached	Bristol City	Free
15 February 2013	(Switzerland) Pajtim Kasami	Fulham	(Switzerland) Luzern	Loan
15 February 2013	(Northern Ireland) Matty Lund	Stoke City	Southend United	Loan
15 February 2013	(Republic of Ireland) Marcos Painter	Brighton & Hove Albion	Bournemouth	Loan
15 February 2013	(Netherlands) Karim Rekik	Manchester City	Blackburn Rovers	Loan
18 February 2013	Jack Robinson	Liverpool	Wolverhampton Wanderers	Loan
19 February 2013	Bradley Wright-Phillips	Charlton Athletic	Brentford	Loan
20 February 2013	John Lundstram	Everton	Doncaster Rovers	Loan
20 February 2013	Liam Moore	Leicester City	Brentford	Loan
21 February 2013	James Alabi	Stoke City	Scunthorpe United	Loan
21 February 2013	(Austria) Jesse Darko	(Wales) Cardiff City	AFC Wimbledon	Loan
21 February 2013	Tom Eaves	Bolton Wanderers	Shrewsbury Town	Loan
21 February 2013	Ryan Edwards	Blackburn Rovers	Fleetwood Town	Loan
21 February 2013	(New Zealand) Cameron Howieson	Burnley	Doncaster Rovers	Loan
21 February 2013	Harry Kane	Tottenham Hotspur	Leicester City	Loan
21 February 2013	(Republic of Ireland) Aaron McCarey	Wolverhampton Wanderers	Walsall	Loan
21 February 2013	Jordan Mustoe	Wigan Athletic	Carlisle United	Loan
21 February 2013	(Mali) Mamady Sidibé	Stoke City	Tranmere Rovers	Loan
21 February 2013	Ryan Tunnicliffe	Manchester United	Barnsley	Loan
22 February 2013	Jordan Clark	Barnsley	Chesterfield	Loan
22 February 2013	Ben Dickenson	Brighton & Hove Albion	AFC Wimbledon	Loan
22 February 2013	Alex Henshall	Manchester City	Chesterfield	Loan
22 February 2013	(Finland) Jesse Joronen	Fulham	Cambridge United	Loan
22 February 2013	Jonathan Obika	Tottenham Hotspur	Charlton Athletic	Loan
22 February 2013	(Jamaica) Theo Robinson	Derby County	Huddersfield Town	Loan
25 February 2013	Sammy Ameobi	Newcastle United	Middlesbrough	Loan
25 February 2013	Reece Brown	Manchester United	Ipswich Town	Loan
25 February 2013	(Finland) Lauri Dalla Valle	Fulham	(Norway) Molde	Undisclosed
25 February 2013	Aaron Martin	Southampton	Coventry City	Loan
27 February 2013	Hogan Ephraim	Queens Park Rangers	(Canada) Toronto FC	Loan
28 February 2013	(Wales) Robert Earnshaw	(Wales) Cardiff City	(Canada) Toronto FC	Undisclosed
28 February 2013	(Northern Ireland) Shane Ferguson	Newcastle United	Birmingham City	Loan
28 February 2013	Wes Fletcher	Burnley	Yeovil Town	Loan
28 February 2013	(Martinique) Frédéric Piquionne	West Ham United	(United States) Portland Timbers	Undisclosed
28 February 2013	Josh Rees	Arsenal	Brentford	Loan
28 February 2013	George Saville	Chelsea	Millwall	Loan
28 February 2013	(Wales) Jake Taylor	Reading	Crawley Town	Loan
1 March 2013	Matthew Briggs	Fulham	Watford	Loan
1 March 2013	Anthony Jeffrey	Arsenal	Stevenage	Loan
1 March 2013	(Sweden) Alexander Kačaniklić	Fulham	Burnley	Loan
1 March 2013	(Scotland) Gary MacKenzie	MK Dons	Blackpool	Loan
1 March 2013	Cameron Stewart	Hull City	Blackburn Rovers	Loan
2 March 2013	David Jones	Wigan Athletic	Blackburn Rovers	Loan
4 March 2013	(Scotland) Craig Forsyth	Watford	Derby County	Loan
4 March 2013	Jake Goodman	Millwall	Luton Town	Loan
5 March 2013	(Hungary) Márkó Futács	Leicester City	Blackpool	Loan
7 March 2013	Danny East	Hull City	Gillingham	Loan
7 March 2013	(Iceland) Brynjar Gunnarsson	Reading	(Iceland) KR	Free
7 March 2013	Troy Hewitt	Queens Park Rangers	Colchester United	Loan
7 March 2013	Arron Jameson	Sheffield Wednesday	York City	Loan
7 March 2013	Ross Jenkins	Watford	Barnet	Loan
7 March 2013	(Norway) Eirik Holmen Johansen	Manchester City	Scunthorpe United	Loan
8 March 2013	John Bostock	Tottenham Hotspur	(Canada) Toronto FC	Loan
8 March 2013	Paul McCallum	West Ham United	Aldershot Town	Loan
8 March 2013	Michael Smith	Charlton Athletic	Colchester United	Loan
8 March 2013	John Sullivan	Charlton Athletic	AFC Wimbledon	Loan
8 March 2013	(Republic of Ireland) Jay Tabb	Reading	Ipswich Town	Loan
11 March 2013	Joe Bryan	Bristol City	Plymouth Argyle	Loan
11 March 2013	(Republic of Ireland) Conor Clifford	Unattached	Leicester City	Free
14 March 2013	(Northern Ireland) Josh Carson	Ipswich Town	York City	Loan
14 March 2013	(Republic of Ireland) Anthony Forde	Wolverhampton Wanderers	Scunthorpe United	Loan
14 March 2013	Ben Gibson	Middlesbrough	Tranmere Rovers	Loan
14 March 2013	Mark Gower	(Wales) Swansea City	Charlton Athletic	Loan
15 March 2013	Leon Barnett	Norwich City	(Wales) Cardiff City	Loan
15 March 2013	Richard Chaplow	Southampton	Millwall	Loan
15 March 2013	Jordan Cook	Charlton Athletic	Yeovil Town	Loan
15 March 2013	Lawson D'Ath	Reading	Exeter City	Loan
15 March 2013	(Wales) Jermaine Easter	Crystal Palace	Millwall	Loan
15 March 2013	Todd Kane	Chelsea	Blackburn Rovers	Loan
15 March 2013	(Latvia) Vitālijs Maksimenko	Brighton & Hove Albion	Yeovil Town	Loan
15 March 2013	Tamika Mkandawire	Millwall	Southend United	Loan
15 March 2013	Ben Reeves	Southampton	Southend United	Loan
15 March 2013	Korey Smith	Norwich City	Oldham Athletic	Loan
20 March 2013	Sam Johnstone	Manchester United	Walsall	Loan
20 March 2013	(Republic of Ireland) Anton Rodgers	Brighton & Hove Albion	Exeter City	Loan
21 March 2013	Olly Lee	Barnet	Birmingham City	Loan
22 March 2013	Kyle De Silva	Crystal Palace	Barnet	Loan
23 March 2013^{[a]}	(Netherlands) Ricky van Wolfswinkel	(Portugal) Sporting CP	Norwich City	£8.5m
25 March 2013	Bobby Reid	Bristol City	Oldham Athletic	Loan
26 March 2013	Ángelo Balanta	Queens Park Rangers	Yeovil Town	Loan
26 March 2013	Adam Reed	Sunderland	York City	Loan
27 March 2013	(Wales) Tom Bender	Unattached	Millwall	Free
27 March 2013	(Belgium) Florent Cuvelier	Stoke City	Peterborough United	Loan
27 March 2013	(Ivory Coast) Aruna Dindane	Unattached	Crystal Palace	Free
27 March 2013	(Nigeria) Seyi Olofinjana	Hull City	Sheffield Wednesday	Loan
27 March 2013	(Ivory Coast) Toni Silva	Barnsley	Dagenham & Redbridge	Loan
28 March 2013	(Netherlands) Akwasi Asante	Birmingham City	Shrewsbury Town	Loan
28 March 2013	(Wales) Jason Brown	Unattached	Ipswich Town	Free
28 March 2013	Danny Butterfield	Southampton	Bolton Wanderers	Loan
28 March 2013	Nathan Byrne	Tottenham Hotspur	Swindon Town	Loan
28 March 2013	Jack Deaman	Birmingham City	Cheltenham Town	Loan
28 March 2013	(France) Nouha Dicko	Wigan Athletic	Wolverhampton Wanderers	Loan
28 March 2013	Matthew Dolan	Middlesbrough	Yeovil Town	Loan
28 March 2013	(Germany) Max Ehmer	Queens Park Rangers	Stevenage	Loan
28 March 2013	Robert Hall	West Ham United	Bolton Wanderers	Loan
28 March 2013	(United States) Stuart Holden	Bolton Wanderers	Sheffield Wednesday	Loan
28 March 2013	Steve Howard	Hartlepool United	Sheffield Wednesday	Loan
28 March 2013	James Hurst	West Bromwich Albion	Shrewsbury Town	Loan
28 March 2013	(Antigua and Barbuda) Calaum Jahraldo-Martin	Dulwich Hamlet	Hull City	Undisclosed
28 March 2013	(Slovakia) Marián Kello	Unattached	Wolverhampton Wanderers	Free
28 March 2013	(Australia) Massimo Luongo	Tottenham Hotspur	Swindon Town	Loan
28 March 2013	(Republic of Ireland) Sean McGinty	Manchester United	Tranmere Rovers	Loan
28 March 2013	Jonathan Miles	Tottenham Hotspur	Dagenham & Redbridge	Loan
28 March 2013	Dean Parrett	Tottenham Hotspur	Swindon Town	Loan
28 March 2013	(Burkina Faso) Florent Rouamba	Unattached	Charlton Athletic	Free
28 March 2013	(Scotland) Romaine Sawyers	West Bromwich Albion	Walsall	Loan
28 March 2013	(Republic of Ireland) Sean St Ledger	Leicester City	Millwall	Loan
28 March 2013	Mo Shariff	Queens Park Rangers	Dagenham & Redbridge	Loan
28 March 2013	Alex Smith	Fulham	Stevenage	Loan
28 March 2013	Kevin Stewart	Tottenham Hotspur	Crewe Alexandra	Loan
29 March 2013	Dennis Knight	Unattached	Barnsley	Free
1 April 2013^{[a]}	(Cameroon) Jean Makoun	Aston Villa	(France) Rennes	Undisclosed
11 April 2013	Daniel Carr	Dulwich Hamlet	Huddersfield Town	Undisclosed
22 April 2013^{[a]}	(Scotland) Andrew Shinnie	(Scotland) Inverness Caledonian Thistle	Birmingham City	Free
26 April 2013^{[a]}	(Republic of Ireland) Jake Carroll	(Republic of Ireland) St Patrick's Athletic	Huddersfield Town	Undisclosed
7 May 2013	(Scotland) Steven Caldwell	Birmingham City	(Canada) Toronto FC	Loan
7 May 2013^{[a]}	Lee Grant	Burnley	Derby County	Free
8 May 2013^{[a]}	Olly Lee	Barnet	Birmingham City	Free
9 May 2013^{[a]}	Chris Martin	Norwich City	Derby County	Free
12 May 2013^{[a]}	Jonson Clarke-Harris	Peterborough United	Oldham Athletic	Undisclosed
14 May 2013^{[a]}	(Spain) Javier Garrido	(Italy) Lazio	Norwich City	Undisclosed
14 May 2013^{[a]}	(Republic of Ireland) Darren Randolph	(Scotland) Motherwell	Birmingham City	Free
14 May 2013^{[a]}	Cole Skuse	Bristol City	Ipswich Town	Free
17 May 2013^{[a]}	Tom Heaton	Bristol City	Burnley	Free
17 May 2013^{[a]}	(Germany) Sascha Riether	(Germany) 1. FC Köln	Fulham	Undisclosed
21 May 2013^{[a]}	Lee Novak	Huddersfield Town	Birmingham City	Free
21 May 2013^{[a]}	(Romania) Răzvan Raț	(Ukraine) Shakhtar Donetsk	West Ham United	Free
22 May 2013^{[a]}	(Venezuela) Fernando Amorebieta	(Spain) Athletic Bilbao	Fulham	Free
22 May 2013^{[a]}	(Ghana) Derek Boateng	(Ukraine) Dnipro Dnipropetrovsk	Fulham	Free
22 May 2013^{[a]}	Jordan Wynter	Arsenal	Bristol City	Free
24 May 2013^{[a]}	Joseph Mills	Reading	Burnley	Free
24 May 2013^{[a]}	Duncan Watmore	Altrincham	Sunderland	Undisclosed
27 May 2013^{[a]}	(Scotland) Danny Wilson	Liverpool	(Scotland) Hearts	Free
28 May 2013^{[a]}	(Scotland) George Boyd	Peterborough United	Hull City	Free
28 May 2013^{[a]}	(Wales) Jermaine Easter	Crystal Palace	Millwall	Free
28 May 2013^{[a]}	Simon Eastwood	Portsmouth	Blackburn Rovers	Free
28 May 2013^{[a]}	(Republic of Ireland) Alan Judge	Notts County	Blackburn Rovers	Free
28 May 2013^{[a]}	Chris Taylor	Millwall	Blackburn Rovers	Free
30 May 2013^{[a]}	Marc Tierney	Norwich City	Bolton Wanderers	Free
31 May 2013^{[a]}	(Wales) Neal Eardley	Blackpool	Birmingham City	Free
3 June 2013^{[a]}	Mark Gower	(Wales) Swansea City	Charlton Athletic	Free
5 June 2013^{[a]}	(Spain) Adrián	(Spain) Real Betis	West Ham United	Free
5 June 2013^{[a]}	(Netherlands) Maarten Stekelenburg	(Italy) Roma	Fulham	Undisclosed
5 June 2013^{[a]}	(Republic of Ireland) Jay Tabb	Reading	Ipswich Town	Free
6 June 2013^{[a]}	(Spain) José Cañas	(Spain) Real Betis	(Wales) Swansea City	Free
6 June 2013^{[a]}	(Brazil) Fernandinho	(Ukraine) Shakhtar Donetsk	Manchester City	£30m
7 June 2013^{[a]}	Wayne Bridge	Manchester City	Reading	Free
7 June 2013^{[a]}	(Republic of Ireland) Daryl Murphy	(Scotland) Celtic	Ipswich Town	Free
7 June 2013^{[a]}	(Bulgaria) Aleksandar Tonev	(Poland) Lech Poznań	Aston Villa	Undisclosed
7 June 2013^{[a]}	(Uruguay) Guillermo Varela	(Uruguay) Peñarol	Manchester United	Undisclosed
10 June 2013^{[a]}	(Scotland) Johnny Russell	(Scotland) Dundee United	Derby County	£750k
10 June 2013^{[a]}	Matt Smith	Oldham Athletic	Leeds United	Free
11 June 2013^{[a]}	(Denmark) Mikkel Andersen	Reading	(Denmark) Randers	Loan
11 June 2013^{[a]}	(Spain) Jesús Navas	(Spain) Sevilla	Manchester City	£14.9m
13 June 2013^{[a]}	(Netherlands) Leandro Bacuna	(Netherlands) Groningen	Aston Villa	Undisclosed
13 June 2013^{[a]}	(Netherlands) Jeffrey Bruma	Chelsea	(Netherlands) PSV	Undisclosed
13 June 2013^{[a]}	(Australia) Alex Cisak	Oldham Athletic	Burnley	Free
13 June 2013^{[a]}	(Scotland) Chris Kettings	Blackpool	York City	Loan
13 June 2013^{[a]}	(Denmark) Jores Okore	(Denmark) Nordsjælland	Aston Villa	Undisclosed
14 June 2013^{[a]}	Nick Arnold	Reading	Wycombe Wanderers	Loan
14 June 2013^{[a]}	(Croatia) Dejan Lovren	(France) Lyon	Southampton	£8.5m
17 June 2013^{[a]}	Jake Bidwell	Everton	Brentford	Undisclosed
17 June 2013^{[a]}	(Honduras) Maynor Figueroa	Wigan Athletic	Hull City	Free
18 June 2013^{[a]}	(Denmark) Nicklas Helenius	(Denmark) Aalborg	Aston Villa	£2m
18 June 2013^{[a]}	Dale Jennings	(Germany) Bayern Munich	Barnsley	£250k
18 June 2013^{[a]}	Declan Rudd	Norwich City	Preston North End	Loan
19 June 2013^{[a]}	Andy Carroll	Liverpool	West Ham United	£15m
19 June 2013^{[a]}	(Chile) Gonzalo Jara	West Bromwich Albion	Nottingham Forest	Free
19 June 2013^{[a]}	(Sweden) David Moberg Karlsson	(Sweden) IFK Göteborg	Sunderland	Undisclosed
19 June 2013^{[a]}	(United States) Eric Lichaj	Aston Villa	Nottingham Forest	Free
20 June 2013^{[a]}	(Spain) Antonio Luna	(Spain) Sevilla	Aston Villa	Undisclosed
20 June 2013^{[a]}	Chris O'Grady	Sheffield Wednesday	Barnsley	Undisclosed
20 June 2013^{[a]}	Danny Whitehead	Stockport County	West Ham United	Undisclosed
21 June 2013^{[a]}	(Netherlands) Royston Drenthe	(Russia) Alania Vladikavkaz	Reading	Undisclosed
21 June 2013^{[a]}	(Republic of Ireland) Derrick Williams	Aston Villa	Bristol City	Free
22 June 2013^{[a]}	(Australia) Brett Holman	Aston Villa	(United Arab Emirates) Al-Nasr	Free
22 June 2013^{[a]}	(Spain) Luis Alberto	(Spain) Sevilla	Liverpool	£6.8m
22 June 2013^{[a]}	(Belgium) Thibaut Courtois	Chelsea	(Spain) Atlético Madrid	Loan
23 June 2013^{[a]}	(Spain) Iago Aspas	(Spain) Celta Vigo	Liverpool	£7m
24 June 2013^{[a]}	Tom Adeyemi	Norwich City	Birmingham City	Free
24 June 2013^{[a]}	Stephen Bywater	Sheffield Wednesday	Millwall	Free
24 June 2013^{[a]}	Adam Hammill	Wolverhampton Wanderers	Huddersfield Town	Undisclosed
24 June 2013^{[a]}	George Saville	Chelsea	Brentford	Loan
24 June 2013^{[a]}	Jon Stead	Bristol City	Huddersfield Town	Free
24 June 2013^{[a]}	Hayden White	Sheffield Wednesday	Bolton Wanderers	Free
25 June 2013^{[a]}	Curtis Davies	Birmingham City	Hull City	£2.25m
25 June 2013^{[a]}	Todd Kane	Chelsea	Blackburn Rovers	Loan
25 June 2013^{[a]}	(Belgium) Simon Mignolet	Sunderland	Liverpool	£9m
25 June 2013^{[a]}	Martin Paterson	Burnley	Huddersfield Town	Free
25 June 2013^{[a]}	(Germany) André Schürrle	(Germany) Bayer Leverkusen	Chelsea	£18m
25 June 2013^{[a]}	(Hungary) József Varga	(Hungary) Debrecen	Middlesbrough	Loan
25 June 2013^{[a]}	(United States) Danny Williams	(Germany) TSG 1899 Hoffenheim	Reading	Undisclosed
26 June 2013^{[a]}	Frank Fielding	Derby County	Bristol City	Undisclosed
26 June 2013^{[a]}	(Democratic Republic of the Congo) Jacques Maghoma	Burton Albion	Sheffield Wednesday	Free
26 June 2013^{[a]}	(Republic of Ireland) Chris McCann	Burnley	Wigan Athletic	Free
26 June 2013^{[a]}	Jed Steer	Norwich City	Aston Villa	Free
26 June 2013^{[a]}	(Argentina) Carlos Tevez	Manchester City	(Italy) Juventus	£12m
27 June 2013^{[a]}	(Spain) Jordi Amat	(Spain) Espanyol	(Wales) Swansea City	£2.5m
27 June 2013^{[a]}	Danny Simpson	Newcastle United	Queens Park Rangers	Free
28 June 2013^{[a]}	(Argentina) Mauro Boselli	Wigan Athletic	(Mexico) Club León	Undisclosed
28 June 2013^{[a]}	(Scotland) Stephen Crainey	Blackpool	Wigan Athletic	Free
28 June 2013^{[a]}	(Egypt) Ahmed Elmohamady	Sunderland	Hull City	£2m
28 June 2013^{[a]}	Nick Liversedge	Whitby Town	Burnley	Free
28 June 2013^{[a]}	(Germany) Marko Marin	Chelsea	(Spain) Sevilla	Loan
28 June 2013^{[a]}	(Wales) Steve Morison	Leeds United	Millwall	Loan
28 June 2013^{[a]}	(Netherlands) Erik Pieters	(Netherlands) PSV	Stoke City	£3m
29 June 2013^{[a]}	(Netherlands) Jonathan de Guzmán	(Spain) Villarreal	(Wales) Swansea City	Loan
30 June 2013^{[a]}	Jack Payne	Gillingham	Peterborough United	Undisclosed
1 July 2013	Patrick Bamford	Chelsea	MK Dons	Loan
1 July 2013	Alex Baptiste	Blackpool	Bolton Wanderers	Free
1 July 2013	(Cape Verde) Cabral	(Switzerland) Basel	Sunderland	Free
1 July 2013	(Denmark) Andreas Cornelius	(Denmark) Copenhagen	(Wales) Cardiff City	£7.5m
1 July 2013	(Wales) David Cornell	(Wales) Swansea City	(Scotland) St Mirren	Loan
1 July 2013	(France) Modibo Diakité	(Italy) Lazio	Sunderland	Free
1 July 2013	(Wales) Christian Dibble	Bury	Barnsley	Free
1 July 2013	(Switzerland) Johan Djourou	Arsenal	(Germany) Hamburger SV	Loan
1 July 2013	(Wales) Gwion Edwards	(Wales) Swansea City	(Scotland) St Johnstone	Loan
1 July 2013	(Scotland) Craig Forsyth	Watford	Derby County	£150k
1 July 2013	(Jamaica) Joel Grant	Wycombe Wanderers	Yeovil Town	Free
1 July 2013	Robert Hall	West Ham United	Bolton Wanderers	Free
1 July 2013	(Ivory Coast) Nuno Henrique	Blackburn Rovers	(Portugal) Arouca	Loan
1 July 2013	Sam Hoskins	Southampton	Yeovil Town	Free
1 July 2013	Uche Ikpeazu	Reading	Watford	Free
1 July 2013	Luke Murphy	Crewe Alexandra	Leeds United	£1m
1 July 2013	(France) Valentin Roberge	(Portugal) Marítimo	Sunderland	Free
1 July 2013	(Norway) Thomas Rogne	(Scotland) Celtic	Wigan Athletic	Free
1 July 2013	(France) Yaya Sanogo	(France) Auxerre	Arsenal	Free
2 July 2013	Kyle Bartley	(Wales) Swansea City	Birmingham City	Loan
2 July 2013	(Scotland) Stephen Dobbie	Brighton & Hove Albion	Crystal Palace	Undisclosed
2 July 2013	(Cyprus) Alex Gogic	(Greece) Olympiacos	(Wales) Swansea City	Free
2 July 2013	(Scotland) David Goodwillie	Blackburn Rovers	(Scotland) Dundee United	Loan
2 July 2013	Devarn Green	Burton Albion	Blackburn Rovers	Undisclosed
2 July 2013	Grant Hall	Tottenham Hotspur	Swindon Town	Loan
2 July 2013	(Australia) Massimo Luongo	Tottenham Hotspur	Swindon Town	Loan
2 July 2013	(Scotland) Allan McGregor	(Turkey) Beşiktaş	Hull City	£1.5m
2 July 2013	Lewis McGugan	Nottingham Forest	Watford	Free
2 July 2013	(Spain) Marc Muniesa	(Spain) Barcelona	Stoke City	Free
2 July 2013	(Australia) Daniel Nizic	Unattached	Burnley	Free
2 July 2013	Jamie Paterson	Walsall	Nottingham Forest	Undisclosed
2 July 2013	(Spain) Alejandro Pozuelo	(Spain) Real Betis	(Wales) Swansea City	Undisclosed
2 July 2013	(Ivory Coast) Kolo Touré	Manchester City	Liverpool	Free
2 July 2013	Dean Whitehead	Stoke City	Middlesbrough	Free
2 July 2013	(Republic of Ireland) Conor Wilkinson	Millwall	Bolton Wanderers	Free
2 July 2013	(Slovenia) Gregor Zabret	(Slovenia) Domžale	(Wales) Swansea City	Undisclosed
3 July 2013	Dan Burn	Fulham	Birmingham City	Loan
3 July 2013	(Netherlands) Dorus de Vries	Wolverhampton Wanderers	Nottingham Forest	Free
3 July 2013	Harry Forrester	Brentford	Doncaster Rovers	Free
3 July 2013	Dwight Gayle	Peterborough United	Crystal Palace	Undisclosed
3 July 2013	Matt Green	Mansfield Town	Birmingham City	Free
3 July 2013	(Republic of Ireland) Noel Hunt	Reading	Leeds United	Free
3 July 2013	(Italy) Vito Mannone	Arsenal	Sunderland	Undisclosed
3 July 2013	James Perch	Newcastle United	Wigan Athletic	Undisclosed
3 July 2013	Jonjo Shelvey	Liverpool	(Wales) Swansea City	£5m
3 July 2013	James Vaughan	Norwich City	Huddersfield Town	Undisclosed
4 July 2013	(France) Nicolas Anelka	Unattached	West Bromwich Albion	Free
4 July 2013	DJ Campbell	Queens Park Rangers	Blackburn Rovers	Free
4 July 2013	Scott Carson	(Turkey) Bursaspor	Wigan Athletic	Undisclosed
4 July 2013	(France) Olivier Kemen	(France) Metz	Newcastle United	Undisclosed
4 July 2013	David McGoldrick	Nottingham Forest	Ipswich Town	Free
4 July 2013	Mark Oxley	Hull City	Oldham Athletic	Loan
4 July 2013	Nathan Redmond	Birmingham City	Norwich City	£3.2m
5 July 2013	(France) Francis Coquelin	Arsenal	(Germany) SC Freiburg	Loan
5 July 2013	(France) Marc-Antoine Fortuné	West Bromwich Albion	Wigan Athletic	Free
5 July 2013	(Scotland) Gary MacKenzie	MK Dons	Blackpool	Undisclosed
5 July 2013	Lee Martin	Ipswich Town	Millwall	Free
5 July 2013	(Czech Republic) Daniel Pudil	(Spain) Granada	Watford	Undisclosed
5 July 2013	(Republic of the Congo) Christopher Samba	Queens Park Rangers	(Russia) Anzhi Makhachkala	£12m
5 July 2013	(Netherlands) Marco van Ginkel	(Netherlands) Vitesse Arnhem	Chelsea	£8m
6 July 2013	Kieffer Moore	Dorchester Town	Yeovil Town	Undisclosed
6 July 2013	(Brazil) Paulinho	(Brazil) Corinthians	Tottenham Hotspur	£17m
7 July 2013	(Netherlands) Patrick van Aanholt	Chelsea	(Netherlands) Vitesse Arnhem	Loan
8 July 2013	Paul Anderson	Bristol City	Ipswich Town	Swap
8 July 2013	Jay Emmanuel-Thomas	Ipswich Town	Bristol City	Swap
8 July 2013	Grant Holt	Norwich City	Wigan Athletic	£2m
8 July 2013	Matthew Kilgallon	Sunderland	Blackburn Rovers	Free
8 July 2013	(Ivory Coast) Arouna Koné	Wigan Athletic	Everton	£6m
9 July 2013	(Paraguay) Antolín Alcaraz	Unattached	Everton	Free
9 July 2013	(United States) Jozy Altidore	(Netherlands) AZ	Sunderland	Undisclosed
9 July 2013	Amari'i Bell	Birmingham City	Nuneaton Town	Loan
9 July 2013	Nathan Byrne	Tottenham Hotspur	Swindon Town	Undisclosed
9 July 2013	(Spain) Joel Robles	(Spain) Atlético Madrid	Everton	Undisclosed
9 July 2013	Alex Marrow	Crystal Palace	Blackburn Rovers	Undisclosed
9 July 2013	(Wales) Lewin Nyatanga	Bristol City	Barnsley	Free
9 July 2013	(North Macedonia) Goran Popov	(Ukraine) Dynamo Kyiv	West Bromwich Albion	Loan
9 July 2013	Alex Pritchard	Tottenham Hotspur	Swindon Town	Loan
9 July 2013	(Australia) Mark Schwarzer	Unattached	Chelsea	Free
10 July 2013	(France) El Hadji Ba	(France) Le Havre	Sunderland	Free
10 July 2013	Billy Clifford	Chelsea	Yeovil Town	Loan
10 July 2013	(Spain) Gerard Deulofeu	(Spain) Barcelona	Everton	Loan
10 July 2013	Carlo Nash	Unattached	Norwich City	Free
10 July 2013	Michael Ngoo	Liverpool	Yeovil Town	Loan
10 July 2013	(Sweden) Martin Olsson	Blackburn Rovers	Norwich City	Undisclosed
10 July 2013	(Netherlands) Karim Rekik	Manchester City	(Netherlands) PSV	Loan
10 July 2013	Jerome Thomas	Unattached	Crystal Palace	Free
10 July 2013	Matthew Upson	Unattached	Brighton & Hove Albion	Free
11 July 2013	(Ivory Coast) Wilfried Bony	(Netherlands) Vitesse Arnhem	(Wales) Swansea City	£12m
11 July 2013	(France) Mohamed Coulibaly	Unattached	Bournemouth	Free
11 July 2013	(Norway) Vegard Forren	Southampton	(Norway) Molde	Undisclosed
11 July 2013	(Scotland) Gary Fraser	(Scotland) Hamilton Academical	Bolton Wanderers	Free
11 July 2013	(Kenya) Victor Wanyama	(Scotland) Celtic	Southampton	£12.5m
12 July 2013	(South Africa) Dean Furman	Unattached	Doncaster Rovers	Free
12 July 2013	Dean Gerken	Unattached	Ipswich Town	Free
12 July 2013	(France) Jérémy Hélan	Manchester City	Sheffield Wednesday	Undisclosed
12 July 2013	(Spain) Oriol Romeu	Chelsea	(Spain) Valencia	Loan
12 July 2013	(Spain) Suso	Liverpool	(Spain) Almería	Loan
13 July 2013	(Netherlands) Akwasi Asante	Birmingham City	Shrewsbury Town	Loan
13 July 2013	(Netherlands) Leroy Fer	(Netherlands) Twente	Norwich City	Undisclosed
14 July 2013	Adam Chicksen	MK Dons	Brighton & Hove Albion	Undisclosed
14 July 2013	Mark Duffy	Scunthorpe United	Doncaster Rovers	Undisclosed
15 July 2013	(Republic of Ireland) Richard Dunne	Unattached	Queens Park Rangers	Free
15 July 2013	Steve Harper	Unattached	Hull City	Free
15 July 2013	Reece James	Manchester United	Carlisle United	Loan
16 July 2013	(Australia) Ryan Edwards	Reading	(Australia) Perth Glory	Loan
16 July 2013	(Italy) Emanuele Giaccherini	(Italy) Juventus	Sunderland	£6.5m
16 July 2013	Jack Hobbs	Hull City	Nottingham Forest	Loan
16 July 2013	(Slovakia) Milan Lalkovič	Chelsea	Walsall	Loan
16 July 2013	Jernade Meade	Unattached	(Wales) Swansea City	Free
16 July 2013	(Ghana) Daniel Pappoe	Chelsea	Colchester United	Loan
17 July 2013	Jason Banton	Crystal Palace	MK Dons	Loan
17 July 2013	(Jamaica) Jermaine Beckford	Leicester City	Bolton Wanderers	Undisclosed
17 July 2013	(Ivory Coast) Daniel Carriço	Reading	(Spain) Sevilla	Loan
17 July 2013	Richard Chaplow	Unattached	Millwall	Free
18 July 2013	Chris Atkinson	Huddersfield Town	Tranmere Rovers	Loan
18 July 2013	(Spain) José Campaña	(Spain) Sevilla	Crystal Palace	Undisclosed
18 July 2013	(United States) Conor Doyle	Derby County	(United States) DC United	Loan
18 July 2013	Anton Forrester	Blackburn Rovers	Bury	Loan
18 July 2013	Bobby Grant	Rochdale	Blackpool	Undisclosed
18 July 2013	(Brazil) Maicon	Manchester City	(Italy) Roma	Undisclosed
18 July 2013	George Porter	Burnley	AFC Wimbledon	Loan
19 July 2013	(Switzerland) Almen Abdi	(Italy) Udinese	Watford	Free
19 July 2013	(Scotland) Scott Allan	West Bromwich Albion	Birmingham City	Loan
19 July 2013	(Italy) Gabriele Angella	(Italy) Udinese	Watford	Free
19 July 2013	(Scotland) Scott Arfield	Huddersfield Town	Burnley	Loan
19 July 2013	Nicky Bailey	Unattached	Millwall	Free
19 July 2013	(Italy) Cristian Battocchio	(Italy) Udinese	Watford	Free
19 July 2013	John Cofie	Unattached	Barnsley	Free
19 July 2013	(Italy) Diego Fabbrini	(Italy) Udinese	Watford	Free
19 July 2013	Danny Graham	Sunderland	Hull City	Loan
19 July 2013	(Montenegro) Stevan Jovetić	(Italy) Fiorentina	Manchester City	£22m
19 July 2013	(Democratic Republic of the Congo) Henoc Mukendi	Liverpool	(Scotland) Partick Thistle	Loan
19 July 2013	(Spain) Álvaro Negredo	(Spain) Sevilla	Manchester City	£20m
19 July 2013	Ryan Noble	Unattached	Burnley	Free
19 July 2013	Danny Seaborne	Unattached	Yeovil Town	Free
19 July 2013	(Switzerland) Frédéric Veseli	Unattached	Ipswich Town	Free
19 July 2013	Sam Walker	Chelsea	Colchester United	Loan
19 July 2013	Richard Wood	Unattached	Charlton Athletic	Free
20 July 2013	(Scotland) Christophe Berra	Unattached	Ipswich Town	Free
20 July 2013	Kevin Phillips	Unattached	Crystal Palace	Free
20 July 2013	(Brazil) André Santos	Arsenal	(Brazil) Flamengo	Undisclosed
21 July 2013	(Northern Ireland) Lee Hodson	Watford	MK Dons	Free
22 July 2013	(Scotland) Ikechi Anya	(Spain) Granada	Watford	Undisclosed
22 July 2013	(Ivory Coast) Zoumana Bakayogo	Unattached	Leicester City	Free
22 July 2013	Reece Brown	Unattached	Watford	Free
22 July 2013	Conor Coady	Liverpool	Sheffield United	Loan
22 July 2013	(Scotland) Gary Fraser	Bolton Wanderers	(Scotland) Partick Thistle	Loan
22 July 2013	Jack O'Connell	Blackburn Rovers	Rochdale	Loan
23 July 2013	(Chile) Cristián Cuevas	(Chile) O'Higgins	Chelsea	£3m
23 July 2013	Ryan Edwards	Blackburn Rovers	Chesterfield	Loan
23 July 2013	(Northern Ireland) Shane Ferguson	Newcastle United	Birmingham City	Loan
23 July 2013	Karl Henry	Wolverhampton Wanderers	Queens Park Rangers	Undisclosed
23 July 2013	Ryan Mason	Tottenham Hotspur	Swindon Town	Loan
23 July 2013	(Australia) Scott McDonald	Middlesbrough	Millwall	Free
23 July 2013	(France) Jean-Yves Mvoto	Unattached	Barnsley	Free
23 July 2013	Alan Tate	(Wales) Swansea City	Yeovil Town	Loan
24 July 2013	(Republic of Ireland) Jack Doherty	(Republic of Ireland) Waterford United	Ipswich Town	Undisclosed
24 July 2013	(Sweden) Joel Ekstrand	(Italy) Udinese	Watford	Free
24 July 2013	John Eustace	Unattached	Derby County	Free
24 July 2013	(Brazil) Iriney	(Spain) Granada	Watford	Free
25 July 2013	(Algeria) Djamel Abdoun	(Greece) Olympiacos	Nottingham Forest	£1.55m
25 July 2013	Michael Chopra	Ipswich Town	Blackpool	Free
25 July 2013	(Croatia) Tomislav Gomelt	Tottenham Hotspur	(Belgium) Royal Antwerp	Loan
25 July 2013	(Scotland) Jamie Mackie	Queens Park Rangers	Nottingham Forest	£1m
25 July 2013	Conor McAleny	Everton	Brentford	Loan
25 July 2013	(Northern Ireland) Luke McCullough	Unattached	Doncaster Rovers	Free
25 July 2013	(Austria) Atdhe Nuhiu	Unattached	Sheffield Wednesday	Free
25 July 2013	(France) Ange-Freddy Plumain	Unattached	Fulham	Free
26 July 2013	(Hungary) Krisztián Adorján	Liverpool	(Netherlands) Groningen	Loan
26 July 2013	John Brayford	Derby County	(Wales) Cardiff City	£1.5m
26 July 2013	(Costa Rica) Joel Campbell	Arsenal	(Greece) Olympiacos	Loan
26 July 2013	(Belgium) Nacer Chadli	(Netherlands) Twente	Tottenham Hotspur	£7m
26 July 2013	Steve Davies	Bristol City	Blackpool	£500k
26 July 2013	(Honduras) Juan Carlos García	(Honduras) Olimpia	Wigan Athletic	Free
26 July 2013	Michael Hector	Reading	(Scotland) Aberdeen	Loan
26 July 2013	Gary Hooper	(Scotland) Celtic	Norwich City	£5m
26 July 2013	(Ivory Coast) Yannick Sagbo	(France) Evian	Hull City	Undisclosed
26 July 2013	James Tavernier	Newcastle United	Shrewsbury Town	Loan
26 July 2013	Ryan Tunnicliffe	Manchester United	Ipswich Town	Loan
27 July 2013	Matt Tubbs	Bournemouth	Rotherham United	Loan
28 July 2013	(France) Alfred N'Diaye	Sunderland	(Turkey) Eskişehirspor	Loan
29 July 2013	Jonathan Hogg	Watford	Huddersfield Town	Undisclosed
29 July 2013	Simon Moore	Brentford	(Wales) Cardiff City	Undisclosed
29 July 2013	(Spain) Pepe Reina	Liverpool	(Italy) Napoli	Loan
29 July 2013	Adam Smith	Tottenham Hotspur	Derby County	Loan
30 July 2013	(Algeria) Mehdi Abeid	Newcastle United	(Greece) Panathinaikos	Loan
30 July 2013	Liam Davis	Unattached	Yeovil Town	Free
30 July 2013	Michael Smith	Charlton Athletic	AFC Wimbledon	Loan
30 July 2013	Seth Nana Twumasi	Unattached	Yeovil Town	Free
31 July 2013	Britt Assombalonga	Watford	Peterborough United	Undisclosed
31 July 2013	David Button	Charlton Athletic	Brentford	Undisclosed
31 July 2013	Steven Caulker	Tottenham Hotspur	(Wales) Cardiff City	£8m
31 July 2013	(South Africa) Bongani Khumalo	Tottenham Hotspur	Doncaster Rovers	Loan
31 July 2013	(Spain) Cristian López	Unattached	Huddersfield Town	Free
31 July 2013	Andrew Surman	Norwich City	Bournemouth	Loan
31 July 2013	Ross Turnbull	Unattached	Doncaster Rovers	Free
1 August 2013	(Netherlands) Kemy Agustien	(Wales) Swansea City	Brighton & Hove Albion	Free
1 August 2013	Charlie Austin	Burnley	Queens Park Rangers	Undisclosed
1 August 2013	Callum Ball	Derby County	Torquay United	Loan
1 August 2013	Leon Barnett	Norwich City	Wigan Athletic	Undisclosed
1 August 2013	Marvin Bartley	Burnley	Leyton Orient	Loan
1 August 2013	(Scotland) Tom Cairney	Hull City	Blackburn Rovers	Loan
1 August 2013	(Wales) Simon Church	Unattached	Charlton Athletic	Free
1 August 2013	David Jones	Unattached	Burnley	Free
1 August 2013	Ryan Inniss	Crystal Palace	Cheltenham Town	Loan
1 August 2013	(Brazil) André Moritz	Unattached	Bolton Wanderers	Free
1 August 2013	Ben Nugent	(Wales) Cardiff City	Brentford	Loan
1 August 2013	Michael Richardson	Newcastle United	Accrington Stanley	Loan
1 August 2013	Jack Robinson	Liverpool	Blackpool	Loan
1 August 2013	Marvin Sordell	Bolton Wanderers	Charlton Athletic	Loan
1 August 2013	Tommy Spurr	Unattached	Blackburn Rovers	Free
2 August 2013	Chuks Aneke	Arsenal	Crewe Alexandra	Loan
2 August 2013	Neal Bishop	Unattached	Blackpool	Free
2 August 2013	Christian Burgess	Middlesbrough	Hartlepool United	Loan
2 August 2013	Jordan Clark	Barnsley	Scunthorpe United	Loan
2 August 2013	(Northern Ireland) Corry Evans	Hull City	Blackburn Rovers	Undisclosed
2 August 2013	(France) Elliot Grandin	Unattached	Crystal Palace	Free
2 August 2013	(Uruguay) Diego Lugano	(France) Paris Saint-Germain	West Bromwich Albion	Free
2 August 2013	Danny Mayor	Sheffield Wednesday	Bury	Loan
2 August 2013	Jordan Pickford	Sunderland	Burton Albion	Loan
2 August 2013	Frazer Richardson	Unattached	Middlesbrough	Free
2 August 2013	Richie Wellens	Unattached	Doncaster Rovers	Free
2 August 2013	(Guinea) Kamil Zayatte	(Turkey) İstanbul BB	Sheffield Wednesday	Free
3 August 2013	Connor Ripley	Middlesbrough	Bradford City	Loan
3 August 2013	(Australia) Ryan Williams	Fulham	Oxford United	Loan
4 August 2013	(United States) Clint Dempsey	Tottenham Hotspur	(United States) Seattle Sounders FC	£6m
5 August 2013	(Republic of Ireland) Michael Harriman	Queens Park Rangers	Gillingham	Loan
5 August 2013	(France) Loïc Rémy	Queens Park Rangers	Newcastle United	Loan
5 August 2013	(Spain) Roberto Soldado	(Spain) Valencia	Tottenham Hotspur	£26m
5 August 2013	(Cameroon) Yann Songo'o	Unattached	Blackburn Rovers	Free
6 August 2013	Reece Wabara	Manchester City	Doncaster Rovers	Loan
6 August 2013	(Ivory Coast) Rafael Floro	Unattached	Sheffield Wednesday	Free
7 August 2013	(Morocco) Adel Taarabt	Queens Park Rangers	Fulham	Loan
7 August 2013	Jordan Sinnott	Huddersfield Town	Bury	Loan
7 August 2013	(Chile) Cristián Cuevas	Chelsea	(Netherlands) Vitesse Arnhem	Loan
7 August 2013	Gary O'Neil	Unattached	Queens Park Rangers	Free
8 August 2013	(Ghana) Albert Adomah	Bristol City	Middlesbrough	£1m
8 August 2013	(Republic of Ireland) Graham Burke	Aston Villa	Shrewsbury Town	Loan
8 August 2013	Shaun Derry	Queens Park Rangers	Millwall	Loan
8 August 2013	(Republic of Ireland) Kevin Feely	Charlton Athletic	Carlisle United	Loan
8 August 2013	(Ivory Coast) Gervinho	Arsenal	(Italy) Roma	£8m
8 August 2013	Kallum Higginbotham	Huddersfield Town	Partick Thistle	Free
8 August 2013	Andy Marshall	Unattached	Millwall	Free
8 August 2013	(Republic of Ireland) James McClean	Sunderland	Wigan Athletic	£1.5m
8 August 2013	(South Korea) Park Ji-sung	Queens Park Rangers	(Netherlands) PSV	Loan
9 August 2013	Jacob Blyth	Leicester City	Northampton Town	Loan
9 August 2013	(Spain) Ignasi Miquel	Arsenal	Leicester City	Loan
9 August 2013	(Brazil) Lucas Piazon	Chelsea	(Netherlands) Vitesse Arnhem	Loan
9 August 2013	Jay Spearing	Liverpool	Bolton Wanderers	Undisclosed
9 August 2013	(Northern Ireland) Adam Thompson	Watford	Southend United	Loan
9 August 2013	Kelvin Wilson	(Scotland) Celtic	Nottingham Forest	£2.5m
10 August 2013	(Republic of Ireland) Keith Andrews	Bolton Wanderers	Brighton & Hove Albion	Loan
10 August 2013	(Republic of Ireland) Samir Carruthers	Aston Villa	MK Dons	Loan
10 August 2013	(Chile) Gary Medel	(Spain) Sevilla	(Wales) Cardiff City	£11m
12 August 2013	(Algeria) Essaïd Belkalem	(Spain) Granada	Watford	Loan
12 August 2013	(Czech Republic) Ondřej Čelůstka	(Turkey) Trabzonspor	Sunderland	Loan
12 August 2013	(Morocco) Marouane Chamakh	Arsenal	Crystal Palace	Undisclosed
12 August 2013	(France) Khalil Lambin	Unattached	Sheffield Wednesday	Free
12 August 2013	Tom Naylor	Derby County	(Wales) Newport County	Loan
13 August 2013	Stewart Downing	Liverpool	West Ham United	£5m
13 August 2013	(Czech Republic) Matěj Vydra	(Italy) Udinese	West Bromwich Albion	Loan
13 August 2013	(Brazil) Wallace	Chelsea	(Italy) Internazionale	Loan
14 August 2013	Kyle Brownhill	Stockport County	Burnley	Free
14 August 2013	Tom Huddlestone	Tottenham Hotspur	Hull City	£5m
14 August 2013	Jake Livermore	Tottenham Hotspur	Hull City	Loan
15 August 2013	(Scotland) Neil Alexander	Unattached	Crystal Palace	Free
15 August 2013	Adam Campbell	Newcastle United	Carlisle United	Loan
15 August 2013	(France) Étienne Capoue	(France) Toulouse	Tottenham Hotspur	£9m
15 August 2013	(Jamaica) Ricardo Fuller	Unattached	Blackpool	Free
15 August 2013	(Spain) Esteban Granero	Queens Park Rangers	(Spain) Real Sociedad	Loan
15 August 2013	Joe Ralls	(Wales) Cardiff City	Yeovil Town	Loan
15 August 2013	(Jamaica) Theo Robinson	Derby County	Doncaster Rovers	Undisclosed
16 August 2013	Darren Bent	Aston Villa	Fulham	Loan
16 August 2013	Nathan Delfouneso	Aston Villa	Blackpool	Loan
16 August 2013	(Wales) Michael Doughty	Queens Park Rangers	Stevenage	Loan
16 August 2013	(Argentina) Mauro Formica	Blackburn Rovers	(Mexico) Cruz Azul	Undisclosed
16 August 2013	(Greece) Dimitrios Konstantopoulos	Unattached	Middlesbrough	Free
16 August 2013	(France) Florian Marange	(France) Bordeaux	Crystal Palace	Free
16 August 2013	Joseph Mills	Burnley	Oldham Athletic	Loan
16 August 2013	Adam Reach	Middlesbrough	Shrewsbury Town	Loan
16 August 2013	(Republic of Ireland) Stephen Ward	Wolverhampton Wanderers	Brighton & Hove Albion	Loan
16 August 2013	(Brazil) Wellington Silva	Arsenal	(Spain) Real Murcia	Loan
17 August 2013	Chris Dunn	Unattached	Yeovil Town	Free
17 August 2013	Sam Johnstone	Manchester United	Yeovil Town	Loan
17 August 2013	Andrai Jones	Barnsley	Tranmere Rovers	Loan
17 August 2013	(Norway) Mats Mørch	Derby County	Burton Albion	Loan
18 August 2013	(Italy) Dani Osvaldo	(Italy) Roma	Southampton	£15m
18 August 2013	(Antigua and Barbuda) Aaron Tumwa	Unattached	Blackburn Rovers	Free
19 August 2013	Scott Parker	Tottenham Hotspur	Fulham	Undisclosed
20 August 2013	Jordan Adekunle	Unattached	Ipswich Town	Free
20 August 2013	(France) Aly Cissokho	(Spain) Valencia	Liverpool	Loan
20 August 2013	Billy Knott	Sunderland	Wycombe Wanderers	Loan
21 August 2013	Matthew Dolan	Middlesbrough	Hartlepool United	Loan
21 August 2013	(Sweden) Johan Elmander	(Turkey) Galatasaray	Norwich City	Loan
21 August 2013	(Wales) Wayne Hennessey	Wolverhampton Wanderers	Yeovil Town	Loan
21 August 2013	(Norway) Marcus Pedersen	(Netherlands) Vitesse Arnhem	Barnsley	Loan
21 August 2013	Jason Puncheon	Southampton	Crystal Palace	Loan
21 August 2013	Scott Wootton	Manchester United	Leeds United	Undisclosed
22 August 2013	(Scotland) Bradden Inman	Newcastle United	Crewe Alexandra	Undisclosed
22 August 2013	(Greece) Charis Mavrias	(Greece) Panathinaikos	Sunderland	Undisclosed
22 August 2013	(Northern Ireland) Paddy McCourt	Unattached	Barnsley	Free
22 August 2013	Scott Sinclair	Manchester City	West Bromwich Albion	Loan
22 August 2013	Jimmy Spencer	Huddersfield Town	Scunthorpe United	Loan
22 August 2013	(Spain) Denis Suárez	Manchester City	(Spain) Barcelona	Undisclosed
23 August 2013	(Republic of Ireland) Charles Dunne	Blackpool	Wycombe Wanderers	Loan
23 August 2013	(Scotland) Matt Phillips	Blackpool	Queens Park Rangers	Undisclosed
23 August 2013	(Switzerland) Anđelko Savić	(Italy) Sampdoria	Sheffield Wednesday	Loan
23 August 2013	Andy Williams	Swindon Town	Yeovil Town	Loan
24 August 2013	(Spain) Iago Falque	Tottenham Hotspur	(Spain) Rayo Vallecano	Loan
26 August 2013	(Cameroon) Stéphane Mbia	Queens Park Rangers	(Spain) Sevilla	Loan
27 August 2013	(Morocco) Oussama Assaidi	Liverpool	Stoke City	Loan
27 August 2013	Rakish Bingham	Wigan Athletic	(Scotland) Falkirk	Loan
27 August 2013	Jake Caprice	Blackpool	(Scotland) St Mirren	Loan
27 August 2013	Mike Pollitt	Wigan Athletic	Barnsley	Loan
27 August 2013	(Republic of Ireland) Enda Stevens	Aston Villa	Notts County	Loan
28 August 2013	(Chile) Ángelo Henríquez	Manchester United	(Spain) Real Zaragoza	Loan
28 August 2013	Ben Marshall	Leicester City	Blackburn Rovers	Undisclosed
28 August 2013	(South Africa) Tokelo Rantie	(Sweden) Malmo FF	Bournemouth	Undisclosed
28 August 2013	(Brazil) Willian	(Russia) Anzhi Makhachkala	Chelsea	£30m
29 August 2013	(Cameroon) Samuel Eto'o	(Russia) Anzhi Makhachkala	Chelsea	Free
29 August 2013	(France) Mathieu Flamini	Unattached	Arsenal	Free
29 August 2013	Danny Hollands	Charlton Athletic	Gillingham	Loan
29 August 2013	(Norway) Morten Gamst Pedersen	Blackburn Rovers	(Turkey) Karabükspor	Undisclosed
29 August 2013	George Taft	Leicester City	York City	Loan
30 August 2013	(Uruguay) Maximiliano Amondarain	(Uruguay) Nacional	(Wales) Cardiff City	Free
30 August 2013	(Romania) Vlad Chiricheș	(Romania) Steaua București	Tottenham Hotspur	£8.5m
30 August 2013	(Denmark) Christian Eriksen	(Netherlands) Ajax	Tottenham Hotspur	£11.5m
30 August 2013	(France) Gaël Givet	Blackburn Rovers	(France) Arles-Avignon	Undisclosed
30 August 2013	Scott Golbourne	Barnsley	Wolverhampton Wanderers	Undisclosed
30 August 2013	Dean Hammond	Southampton	Leicester City	Undisclosed
30 August 2013	Erik Lamela	(Italy) Roma	Tottenham Hotspur	£25.7m
30 August 2013	Curtis Main	Middlesbrough	Shrewsbury Town	Loan
30 August 2013	(Slovakia) Albert Rusnák	Manchester City	Oldham Athletic	Loan
31 August 2013	(South Korea) Ki Sung-yueng	(Wales) Swansea City	Sunderland	Loan
31 August 2013	(Australia) Massimo Luongo	Tottenham Hotspur	Swindon Town	£400k
31 August 2013	Jordan Spence	West Ham United	Sheffield Wednesday	Loan
31 August 2013	(France) Kévin Théophile-Catherine	(France) Rennes	(Wales) Cardiff City	£2.1m
1 September 2013	(Ghana) Christian Atsu	(Portugal) Porto	Chelsea	£3.5m
1 September 2013	(Ghana) Christian Atsu	Chelsea	(Netherlands) Vitesse Arnhem	Loan
1 September 2013	(Wales) Gareth Bale	Tottenham Hotspur	(Spain) Real Madrid	£85.3m
1 September 2013	(Argentina) Martín Demichelis	(Spain) Atlético Madrid	Manchester City	£4.2m
1 September 2013	Jack Hunt	Huddersfield Town	Crystal Palace	Undisclosed
1 September 2013	(Mali) Jimmy Kébé	Reading	Crystal Palace	Undisclosed
2 September 2013	(France) Morgan Amalfitano	(France) Marseille	West Bromwich Albion	Loan
2 September 2013	(Nigeria) Victor Anichebe	Everton	West Bromwich Albion	£6m
2 September 2013	(Austria) Marko Arnautović	(Germany) Werder Bremen	Stoke City	Undisclosed
2 September 2013	(Cameroon) Benoît Assou-Ekotto	Tottenham Hotspur	Queens Park Rangers	Loan
2 September 2013	(Scotland) Barry Bannan	Aston Villa	Crystal Palace	Undisclosed
2 September 2013	Gareth Barry	Manchester City	Everton	Loan
2 September 2013	(Italy) Fabio Borini	Liverpool	Sunderland	Loan
2 September 2013	Harry Bunn	Manchester City	Sheffield United	Loan
2 September 2013	Jacob Butterfield	Norwich City	Middlesbrough	Undisclosed
2 September 2013	(Scotland) Paul Caddis	Swindon Town	Birmingham City	Undisclosed
2 September 2013	(Northern Ireland) Lee Camp	Unattached	West Bromwich Albion	Free
2 September 2013	Tom Carroll	Tottenham Hotspur	Queens Park Rangers	Loan
2 September 2013	(Belgium) Florent Cuvelier	Stoke City	Sheffield United	Undisclosed
2 September 2013	(Italy) Andrea Dossena	(Italy) Napoli	Sunderland	Undisclosed
2 September 2013	(Belgium) Marouane Fellaini	Everton	Manchester United	£27.5m
2 September 2013	Liam Fontaine	Bristol City	Yeovil Town	Loan
2 September 2013	(Hungary) Márkó Futács	Leicester City	(Hungary) Diósgyőri	Loan
2 September 2013	(Egypt) Gedo	(Egypt) Al Ahly	Hull City	Loan
2 September 2013	Danny Green	Charlton Athletic	MK Dons	Loan
2 September 2013	(Algeria) Adlène Guedioura	Nottingham Forest	Crystal Palace	Undisclosed
2 September 2013	Sam Hutchinson	Chelsea	(Netherlands) Vitesse Arnhem	Loan
2 September 2013	(Ivory Coast) Tiago Ilori	(Portugal) Sporting CP	Liverpool	£7m
2 September 2013	(Republic of Ireland) Stephen Ireland	Aston Villa	Stoke City	Loan
2 September 2013	Cameron Jerome	Stoke City	Crystal Palace	Loan
2 September 2013	(Ivory Coast) Francisco Júnior	Everton	(Netherlands) Vitesse Arnhem	Loan
2 September 2013	(Sierra Leone) Kei Kamara	(United States) Sporting Kansas City	Middlesbrough	Undisclosed
2 September 2013	Michael Kightly	Stoke City	Burnley	Loan
2 September 2013	(Czech Republic) Libor Kozák	(Italy) Lazio	Aston Villa	£7m
2 September 2013	(Croatia) Niko Kranjčar	(Ukraine) Dynamo Kyiv	Queens Park Rangers	Loan
2 September 2013	(Belgium) Romelu Lukaku	Chelsea	Everton	Loan
2 September 2013	(Jamaica) Adrian Mariappa	Reading	Crystal Palace	Undisclosed
2 September 2013	(Zambia) Emmanuel Mayuka	Southampton	(France) Sochaux	Loan
2 September 2013	(Republic of Ireland) James McCarthy	Wigan Athletic	Everton	£13m
2 September 2013	(Republic of Ireland) Stephen McLaughlin	Nottingham Forest	Bristol City	Loan
2 September 2013	(Nigeria) Victor Moses	Chelsea	Liverpool	Loan
2 September 2013	James O'Connor	Derby County	Bristol City	Loan
2 September 2013	(Nigeria) Peter Odemwingie	West Bromwich Albion	(Wales) Cardiff City	£2.25m
2 September 2013	Bradley Orr	Blackburn Rovers	Blackpool	Loan
2 September 2013	(Germany) Mesut Özil	(Spain) Real Madrid	Arsenal	£42.4m
2 September 2013	(Spain) Daniel Pacheco	Liverpool	(Spain) Alcorcón	Undisclosed
2 September 2013	Nick Powell	Manchester United	Wigan Athletic	Loan
2 September 2013	Peter Ramage	Crystal Palace	Barnsley	Loan
2 September 2013	(Ivory Coast) Abdul Razak	Manchester City	(Russia) Anzhi Makhachkala	Loan
2 September 2013	(France) Mamadou Sakho	(France) Paris Saint-Germain	Liverpool	£18m
2 September 2013	(Benin) Stéphane Sessègnon	Sunderland	West Bromwich Albion	Undisclosed
2 September 2013	Ryan Shotton	Stoke City	Wigan Athletic	Loan
2 September 2013	Cameron Stewart	Hull City	Charlton Athletic	Loan
2 September 2013	Jayden Stockley	Bournemouth	Leyton Orient	Loan
2 September 2013	Conor Townsend	Hull City	Carlisle United	Loan
2 September 2013	(Italy) Marcello Trotta	Fulham	Brentford	Loan
2 September 2013	Nathan Tyson	Derby County	Blackpool	Free
2 September 2013	(Spain) Álvaro Vázquez	(Spain) Getafe	(Wales) Swansea City	Loan
2 September 2013	(Belgium) Marnick Vermijl	Manchester United	(Netherlands) NEC	Loan
2 September 2013	(Italy) Emiliano Viviano	(Italy) Palermo	Arsenal	Loan
2 September 2013	(Netherlands) Marvin Zeegelaar	(Turkey) Elazığspor	Blackpool	Loan
2 September 2013	(Montenegro) Elsad Zverotić	(Switzerland) Young Boys	Fulham	Undisclosed

^{a} Player officially joined his club after the transfer window opened on 1 July 2013.
