= List of English football transfers winter 2013–14 =

The 2013–14 winter transfer window for English football transfers opened on 1 January and closed on 31 January 2014. Additionally, players without a club could join at any time, clubs below Premier League level could sign players on loan at any time, and clubs could sign a goalkeeper on an emergency loan if they had no registered goalkeeper available. This list includes transfers featuring at least one Premier League or Championship club which were completed after the end of the summer 2013 transfer window and before the end of the 2013–14 winter window.

== Transfers ==
All players, and clubs without a flag are English. Note that while Cardiff City and Swansea City are affiliated with the Football Association of Wales and thus take the Welsh flag, they play in the English football league system, and so their transfers are included here.

Date	Name	Moving from	Moving to	Fee
4 September 2013	Ben Alnwick	Unattached	Charlton Athletic	Free
4 September 2013	(France) Romain Amalfitano	Newcastle United	(France) Dijon	Loan
6 September 2013	(Turkey) Kerim Frei	Fulham	(Turkey) Beşiktaş	Undisclosed
6 September 2013	(Sweden) Osman Sow	Unattached	Crystal Palace	Free
9 September 2013	Gary Woods	Unattached	Watford	Free
10 September 2013	(Croatia) Mladen Petrić	Unattached	West Ham United	Free
10 September 2013	(Wales) Jazz Richards	(Wales) Swansea City	Huddersfield Town	Loan
10 September 2013	Martin Taylor	Sheffield Wednesday	Brentford	Loan
10 September 2013	(Portugal) João Carlos Teixeira	Liverpool	Brentford	Loan
12 September 2013	Paul Connolly	Unattached	Millwall	Free
12 September 2013	Shwan Jalal	Bournemouth	Oxford United	Loan
12 September 2013	Martyn Waghorn	Leicester City	Millwall	Loan
13 September 2013	Kwesi Appiah	Crystal Palace	Cambridge United	Loan
13 September 2013	(Scotland) Craig Conway	(Wales) Cardiff City	Brighton & Hove Albion	Loan
13 September 2013	Luke Garbutt	Everton	Colchester United	Loan
13 September 2013	(Republic of Ireland) Jack Grealish	Aston Villa	Notts County	Loan
13 September 2013	Jordan Pickford	Sunderland	Burton Albion	Loan
16 September 2013	Roger Johnson	Wolverhampton Wanderers	Sheffield Wednesday	Loan
16 September 2013	(Italy) Federico Macheda	Manchester United	Doncaster Rovers	Loan
16 September 2013	Ryan Watson	Unattached	Leicester City	Free
17 September 2013	(Scotland) Stephen Dobbie	Crystal Palace	Blackpool	Loan
17 September 2013	George Swan	Manchester City	Sheffield Wednesday	Loan
17 September 2013	(Poland) Marcin Wasilewski	Unattached	Leicester City	Free
19 September 2013	Nathaniel Chalobah	Chelsea	Nottingham Forest	Loan
19 September 2013	Jesse Lingard	Manchester United	Birmingham City	Loan
19 September 2013	John Marquis	Millwall	Portsmouth	Loan
19 September 2013	(Republic of Ireland) Stephen McPhail	Unattached	Sheffield Wednesday	Free
20 September 2013	(Northern Ireland) Chris Baird	Unattached	Reading	Free
20 September 2013	Ryan Hall	Leeds United	Sheffield United	Loan
20 September 2013	Josh McEachran	Chelsea	Watford	Loan
20 September 2013	(Northern Ireland) Jamie Sendles-White	Queens Park Rangers	Colchester United	Loan
20 September 2013	Gary Taylor-Fletcher	Unattached	Leicester City	Free
21 September 2013	Tom Eaves	Bolton Wanderers	Rotherham United	Loan
25 September 2013	(Uruguay) Javier Chevantón	Unattached	Queens Park Rangers	Free
26 September 2013	Ade Azeez	Charlton Athletic	Torquay United	Loan
26 September 2013	Jack Butland	Stoke City	Barnsley	Loan
26 September 2013	Neil Danns	Leicester City	Bolton Wanderers	Loan
26 September 2013	(Republic of Ireland) Shane Duffy	Everton	Yeovil Town	Loan
26 September 2013	Billy Sharp	Southampton	Reading	Loan
26 September 2013	Paul Taylor	Ipswich Town	Peterborough United	Loan
27 September 2013	Liam Feeney	Millwall	Bolton Wanderers	Loan
27 September 2013	David Fox	Norwich City	Barnsley	Loan
27 September 2013	Matty Fryatt	Hull City	Sheffield Wednesday	Loan
27 September 2013	(Scotland) Kevin McNaughton	(Wales) Cardiff City	Bolton Wanderers	Loan
28 September 2013	Liam Ridehalgh	Huddersfield Town	Tranmere Rovers	Loan
30 September 2013	(United States) Zak Whitbread	Leicester City	Derby County	Loan
1 October 2013	(Wales) Jack Collison	West Ham United	Bournemouth	Loan
1 October 2013	James Henry	Millwall	Wolverhampton Wanderers	Loan
1 October 2013	Jordan Mustoe	Wigan Athletic	Bury	Loan
1 October 2013	(Republic of Ireland) Anthony O'Connor	Blackburn Rovers	Torquay United	Loan
3 October 2013	James Caton	Blackpool	Accrington Stanley	Loan
3 October 2013	(Republic of Ireland) Stephen Henderson	West Ham United	Bournemouth	Loan
3 October 2013	Jimmy McNulty	Barnsley	Tranmere Rovers	Loan
4 October 2013	(Portugal) Bruno Andrade	Queens Park Rangers	Stevenage	Loan
4 October 2013	Lewis Dunk	Brighton & Hove Albion	Bristol City	Loan
4 October 2013	Nathan Eccleston	Blackpool	Carlisle United	Loan
4 October 2013	Dan Gosling	Newcastle United	Blackpool	Loan
4 October 2013	(Scotland) Simon Lappin	(Wales) Cardiff City	Sheffield United	Loan
4 October 2013	Luke O'Neill	Burnley	York City	Loan
5 October 2013	Dave Syers	Doncaster Rovers	Scunthorpe United	Loan
10 October 2013	(Spain) Cristian	Huddersfield Town	Shrewsbury Town	Loan
11 October 2013	Jak McCourt	Leicester City	Torquay United	Loan
11 October 2013	Bradley Watkins	Aston Villa	Tranmere Rovers	Loan
12 October 2013	(Republic of Ireland) Rob Kiernan	Wigan Athletic	Southend United	Loan
14 October 2013	Carlton Cole	Unattached	West Ham United	Free
15 October 2013	(Argentina) Emiliano Martínez	Arsenal	Sheffield Wednesday	Loan
15 October 2013	Charlie Taylor	Leeds United	Fleetwood Town	Loan
16 October 2013	Leroy Lita	(Wales) Swansea City	Brighton & Hove Albion	Loan
17 October 2013	(Scotland) Fraser Fyvie	Wigan Athletic	Yeovil Town	Loan
17 October 2013	Alex Henshall	Manchester City	Bristol Rovers	Loan
17 October 2013	(United States) Will Packwood	Birmingham City	Bristol Rovers	Loan
17 October 2013	(Ivory Coast) Abdul Razak	Manchester City	(Russia) Anzhi Makhachkala	Undisclosed
18 October 2013	Simon Dawkins	Tottenham Hotspur	Derby County	Loan
18 October 2013	Kadeem Harris	(Wales) Cardiff City	Brentford	Loan
21 October 2013	(Republic of Ireland) Frankie Sutherland	Queens Park Rangers	Leyton Orient	Loan
22 October 2013	Elliot Lee	West Ham United	Colchester United	Loan
22 October 2013	Paul McCallum	West Ham United	Torquay United	Loan
22 October 2013	Andre Wisdom	Liverpool	Derby County	Loan
23 October 2013	(Spain) Daniel Ayala	Norwich City	Middlesbrough	Loan
23 October 2013	(United States) Oguchi Onyewu	Unattached	Queens Park Rangers	Free
24 October 2013	Dexter Blackstock	Nottingham Forest	Leeds United	Loan
24 October 2013	(Republic of Ireland) Cian Bolger	Bolton Wanderers	Colchester United	Loan
24 October 2013	Arran Lee-Barrett	Unattached	Bolton Wanderers	Free
24 October 2013	(Jamaica) Jamar Loza	Norwich City	Coventry City	Loan
24 October 2013	Jordan Spence	West Ham United	Milton Keynes Dons	Loan
25 October 2013	Kyle Bennett	Doncaster Rovers	Crawley Town	Loan
25 October 2013	(Wales) Dave Richards	(Wales) Cardiff City	Bristol City	Loan
25 October 2013	(South Korea) Yun Suk-young	Queens Park Rangers	Doncaster Rovers	Loan
26 October 2013	(Nigeria) Seyi Olofinjana	Unattached	Sheffield Wednesday	Free
26 October 2013	(Lithuania) Marius Žaliūkas	Unattached	Leeds United	Free
28 October 2013	George Evans	Manchester City	Crewe Alexandra	Loan
29 October 2013	(Republic of Ireland) Aidy White	Leeds United	Sheffield United	Loan
30 October 2013	Marc Albrighton	Aston Villa	Wigan Athletic	Loan
30 October 2013	(Scotland) Paul Gallagher	Leicester City	Preston North End	Loan
31 October 2013	James Alabi	Stoke City	Mansfield Town	Loan
31 October 2013	(Northern Ireland) Lee Camp	West Bromwich Albion	Bournemouth	Loan
31 October 2013	(Poland) Dariusz Dudka	Unattached	Birmingham City	Free
31 October 2013	Simon Gillett	Nottingham Forest	Bristol City	Loan
31 October 2013	Karleigh Osborne	Millwall	Bristol City	Loan
31 October 2013	Adedeji Oshilaja	(Wales) Cardiff City	(Wales) Newport County	Loan
31 October 2013	(Wales) David Vaughan	Sunderland	Nottingham Forest	Loan
1 November 2013	Tyler Blackett	Manchester United	Blackpool	Loan
1 November 2013	Emmanuel Dieseruvwe	Sheffield Wednesday	Fleetwood Town	Loan
1 November 2013	Connor Wickham	Sunderland	Sheffield Wednesday	Loan
4 November 2013	(Germany) Max Ehmer	Queens Park Rangers	Carlisle United	Loan
5 November 2013	(Trinidad and Tobago) Justin Hoyte	Middlesbrough	Millwall	Loan
6 November 2013	Jacob Blyth	Leicester City	Northampton Town	Loan
6 November 2013	George Thorne	West Bromwich Albion	Watford	Loan
8 November 2013	Hogan Ephraim	Queens Park Rangers	Peterborough United	Loan
8 November 2013	(Republic of Ireland) Stephen Hunt	Unattached	Ipswich Town	Free
9 November 2013	(Mali) Kalifa Cissé	Unattached	Derby County	Free
11 November 2013	Michael Jacobs	Derby County	Wolverhampton Wanderers	Loan
12 November 2013	(Wales) Kieron Freeman	Derby County	Notts County	Loan
12 November 2013	Reuben Noble-Lazarus	Barnsley	Scunthorpe United	Loan
13 November 2013	(Wales) Elliott Hewitt	Ipswich Town	Gillingham	Loan
14 November 2013	Micah Evans	Unattached	Burnley	Free
14 November 2013	(France) Guy Moussi	Nottingham Forest	Millwall	Loan
14 November 2013	Gozie Ugwu	Reading	Shrewsbury Town	Loan
15 November 2013	Ben Amos	Manchester United	Carlisle United	Loan
18 November 2013	Stuart Taylor	Reading	Yeovil Town	Loan
19 November 2013	Daniel Carr	Huddersfield Town	Fleetwood Town	Loan
19 November 2013	Josh Wright	Millwall	Leyton Orient	Loan
20 November 2013	(France) Nouha Dicko	Wigan Athletic	Rotherham United	Loan
20 November 2013	Dan Potts	West Ham United	Portsmouth	Loan
21 November 2013	(Italy) Federico Macheda	Manchester United	Doncaster Rovers	Loan
21 November 2013	Aaron McLean	Hull City	Birmingham City	Loan
21 November 2013	Nick Pope	Charlton Athletic	York City	Loan
21 November 2013	Nathan Tyson	Blackpool	Fleetwood Town	Loan
22 November 2013	George Barker	Brighton & Hove Albion	(Wales) Newport County	Loan
22 November 2013	(Spain) Héctor Bellerín	Arsenal	Watford	Loan
22 November 2013	(Philippines) Neil Etheridge	Fulham	Crewe Alexandra	Loan
22 November 2013	Fitz Hall	Unattached	Watford	Free
22 November 2013	(Northern Ireland) Caolan Lavery	Sheffield Wednesday	Plymouth Argyle	Loan
22 November 2013	(Canada) Michael Petrasso	Queens Park Rangers	Oldham Athletic	Loan
25 November 2013	(Republic of Ireland) Kevin Feely	Charlton Athletic	AFC Wimbledon	Loan
25 November 2013	John Marquis	Millwall	Torquay United	Loan
26 November 2013	(Montserrat) Donervon Daniels	West Bromwich Albion	Gillingham	Loan
26 November 2013	Micah Evans	Burnley	Hereford United	Loan
26 November 2013	(Benin) Rudy Gestede	(Wales) Cardiff City	Blackburn Rovers	Loan
28 November 2013	Callum Ball	Derby County	Notts County	Loan
28 November 2013	Harry Bunn	Manchester City	Huddersfield Town	Loan
28 November 2013	Chris Dagnall	Barnsley	Coventry City	Loan
28 November 2013	Lawson D'Ath	Reading	Dagenham & Redbridge	Loan
28 November 2013	Tom Eaves	Bolton Wanderers	Shrewsbury Town	Loan
28 November 2013	Ryan Edwards	Blackburn Rovers	Tranmere Rovers	Loan
28 November 2013	(Wales) Morgan Fox	Charlton Athletic	Notts County	Loan
28 November 2013	Cameron Gayle	West Bromwich Albion	Shrewsbury Town	Loan
28 November 2013	(Republic of Ireland) Shay Given	Aston Villa	Middlesbrough	Loan
28 November 2013	Jordan Graham	Aston Villa	Ipswich Town	Loan
28 November 2013	Scott Harrison	Sunderland	Bury	Loan
28 November 2013	Tom Hitchcock	Queens Park Rangers	Crewe Alexandra	Loan
28 November 2013	Dale Jennings	Barnsley	Milton Keynes Dons	Loan
28 November 2013	Bradley Jordan	Charlton Athletic	Notts County	Loan
28 November 2013	Wade Joyce	Barnsley	Oldham Athletic	Loan
28 November 2013	Michael Keane	Manchester United	Derby County	Loan
28 November 2013	Will Keane	Manchester United	Wigan Athletic	Loan
28 November 2013	(Wales) Tom Lawrence	Manchester United	Carlisle United	Loan
28 November 2013	John Lundstram	Everton	Yeovil Town	Loan
28 November 2013	(Scotland) Chris Maguire	Sheffield Wednesday	Coventry City	Loan
28 November 2013	(Portugal) Mesca	Fulham	Crewe Alexandra	Loan
28 November 2013	Ishmael Miller	Nottingham Forest	Yeovil Town	Loan
28 November 2013	Adam Morgan	Liverpool	Yeovil Town	Loan
28 November 2013	Josh Morris	Blackburn Rovers	Carlisle United	Loan
28 November 2013	(Sweden) Kristoffer Peterson	Liverpool	Tranmere Rovers	Loan
28 November 2013	Ellis Plummer	Manchester City	Oldham Athletic	Loan
28 November 2013	Craig Roddan	Liverpool	Carlisle United	Loan
28 November 2013	Kemar Roofe	West Bromwich Albion	Cheltenham Town	Loan
28 November 2013	Danny Seaborne	Yeovil Town	Coventry City	Loan
28 November 2013	(Switzerland) Benjamin Siegrist	Aston Villa	Burton Albion	Loan
28 November 2013	(Republic of Ireland) Enda Stevens	Aston Villa	Doncaster Rovers	Loan
28 November 2013	James Tavernier	Newcastle United	Rotherham United	Loan
28 November 2013	Blair Turgott	West Ham United	Colchester United	Loan
28 November 2013	Marcus Tudgay	Nottingham Forest	Barnsley	Loan
28 November 2013	(Slovenia) Haris Vučkić	Newcastle United	Rotherham United	Loan
28 November 2013	Nico Yennaris	Arsenal	Bournemouth	Loan
3 December 2013	(Netherlands) Glenn Loovens	Unattached	Sheffield Wednesday	Free
10 December 2013	(Israel) Yossi Benayoun	Unattached	Queens Park Rangers	Free
12 December 2013	(Australia) Patrick Antelmi	Unattached	Wigan Athletic	Free
13 December 2013	(United States) Gboly Ariyibi	Unattached	Leeds United	Free
13 December 2013	Connor Mahoney	Accrington Stanley	Blackburn Rovers	Undisclosed
19 December 2013	Sylvan Ebanks-Blake	Unattached	Ipswich Town	Free
24 December 2013^{[a]}	(United States) Clint Dempsey	(United States) Seattle Sounders FC	Fulham	Loan
30 December 2013^{[a]}	(Spain) Marcos Alonso	(Italy) Fiorentina	Sunderland	Loan
31 December 2013^{[a]}	Jaanai Gordon	Peterborough United	West Ham United	Undisclosed
31 December 2013^{[a]}	James Henry	Millwall	Wolverhampton Wanderers	Undisclosed
31 December 2013	(Switzerland) Frédéric Veseli	Ipswich Town	Bury	Loan
1 January 2014	Stephen Arthurworrey	Fulham	Tranmere Rovers	Loan
1 January 2014	Hallam Hope	Everton	Northampton Town	Loan
1 January 2014	Matthew Pennington	Everton	Tranmere Rovers	Loan
1 January 2014	(United States) Brek Shea	Stoke City	Barnsley	Loan
2 January 2014	(Wales) Daniel Alfei	(Wales) Swansea City	Portsmouth	Loan
2 January 2014	(Scotland) Tom Cairney	Hull City	Blackburn Rovers	Undisclosed
2 January 2014	(Benin) Rudy Gestede	(Wales) Cardiff City	Blackburn Rovers	Undisclosed
2 January 2014	(Trinidad and Tobago) Justin Hoyte	Middlesbrough	Millwall	Undisclosed
2 January 2014	(Italy) Matteo Lanzoni	Unattached	Yeovil Town	Free
2 January 2014	(Burkina Faso) Bertrand Traoré	Chelsea	(Netherlands) Vitesse Arnhem	Loan
3 January 2014	(Sweden) Astrit Ajdarević	(Belgium) Standard Liège	Charlton Athletic	Loan
3 January 2014	Adam Buxton	Wigan Athletic	Burton Albion	Loan
3 January 2014	Shaq Coulthirst	Tottenham Hotspur	Leyton Orient	Loan
3 January 2014	Simon Dawkins	Tottenham Hotspur	Derby County	Undisclosed
3 January 2014	(Wales) Elliott Hewitt	Ipswich Town	Gillingham	Loan
3 January 2014	Jack Marriott	Ipswich Town	Gillingham	Loan
3 January 2014	(Germany) Alexander Merkel	(Italy) Udinese	Watford	Loan
3 January 2014	Adam Morgan	Liverpool	Yeovil Town	Free
3 January 2014	(Scotland) Jamie Ness	Stoke City	Leyton Orient	Loan
3 January 2014	(Sweden) Mathias Ranégie	(Italy) Udinese	Watford	Undisclosed
3 January 2014	Alan Tate	(Wales) Swansea City	(Scotland) Aberdeen	Loan
3 January 2014	Conor Townsend	Hull City	Carlisle United	Loan
3 January 2014	Charlie Wyke	Middlesbrough	AFC Wimbledon	Loan
4 January 2014	(Northern Ireland) Lee Camp	West Bromwich Albion	Bournemouth	Free
4 January 2014	Craig Roddan	Liverpool	Accrington Stanley	Loan
6 January 2014	Miles Addison	Bournemouth	Rotherham United	Loan
6 January 2014	Patrick Bamford	Chelsea	Derby County	Loan
6 January 2014	Roger Johnson	Wolverhampton Wanderers	West Ham United	Loan
6 January 2014	(Jamaica) Jamar Loza	Norwich City	Leyton Orient	Loan
6 January 2014	Matt Tubbs	Bournemouth	Crawley Town	Loan
7 January 2014	George Barker	Brighton & Hove Albion	Swindon Town	Undisclosed
7 January 2014	(Scotland) Jack Grimmer	Fulham	Port Vale	Loan
7 January 2014	(Switzerland) Eldin Jakupović	Hull City	Leyton Orient	Loan
7 January 2014	Chris Long	Everton	Milton Keynes Dons	Loan
7 January 2014	(France) Mikael Mandron	Sunderland	Fleetwood Town	Loan
7 January 2014	(Nigeria) Kenneth Omeruo	Chelsea	Middlesbrough	Loan
7 January 2014	Karleigh Osborne	Millwall	Bristol City	Undisclosed
8 January 2014	Jason Banton	Crystal Palace	Plymouth Argyle	Undisclosed
8 January 2014	(Norway) Magnus Wolff Eikrem	(Netherlands) Heerenveen	(Wales) Cardiff City	Undisclosed
8 January 2014	Michael Jacobs	Derby County	Wolverhampton Wanderers	Undisclosed
8 January 2014	(Republic of Ireland) Alan Judge	Blackburn Rovers	Brentford	Loan
8 January 2014	(Slovakia) Filip Kiss	(Wales) Cardiff City	(Scotland) Ross County	Loan
8 January 2014	Jonathan Obika	Tottenham Hotspur	Brighton & Hove Albion	Loan
8 January 2014	(Republic of Ireland) Connor Smith	Watford	Gillingham	Loan
9 January 2014	Chuba Akpom	Arsenal	Brentford	Loan
9 January 2014	(Cape Verde) Cabral	Sunderland	(Italy) Genoa	Loan
9 January 2014	(Scotland) Matthew Kennedy	Everton	Tranmere Rovers	Loan
9 January 2014	(Northern Ireland) Ryan McLaughlin	Liverpool	Barnsley	Loan
9 January 2014	(Ivory Coast) Abdoulaye Méïté	Unattached	Doncaster Rovers	Free
9 January 2014	Dominic Samuel	Reading	Dagenham & Redbridge	Loan
9 January 2014	Cameron Stewart	Hull City	Leeds United	Loan
9 January 2014	Jayden Stockley	Bournemouth	Torquay United	Loan
10 January 2014	(Austria) Ashley Barnes	Brighton & Hove Albion	Burnley	Undisclosed
10 January 2014	Tyias Browning	Everton	Wigan Athletic	Loan
10 January 2014^{[b]}	Jermain Defoe	Tottenham Hotspur	(Canada) Toronto FC	£6m
10 January 2014	Jordan Graham	Aston Villa	Bradford City	Loan
10 January 2014	(Scotland) Jonathan Henly	Reading	Oxford United	Loan
10 January 2014	Tom Hitchcock	Queens Park Rangers	Rotherham United	Loan
10 January 2014	Arron Jameson	Sheffield Wednesday	Bradford City	Loan
10 January 2014	(Mali) Jimmy Kébé	Crystal Palace	Leeds United	Loan
10 January 2014	(Republic of Ireland) Paddy Madden	Yeovil Town	Scunthorpe United	Undisclosed
10 January 2014	Billy Paynter	Doncaster Rovers	Sheffield United	Loan
10 January 2014	Dave Syers	Doncaster Rovers	Scunthorpe United	Undisclosed
10 January 2014	(Bermuda) Nahki Wells	Bradford City	Huddersfield Town	Undisclosed
11 January 2014	(Paraguay) Javier Acuña	Watford	(Spain) Osasuna	Loan
11 January 2014	(Norway) Mats Møller Dæhli	(Norway) Molde	(Wales) Cardiff City	Undisclosed
11 January 2014	(Algeria) Riyad Mahrez	(France) Le Havre	Leicester City	Undisclosed
11 January 2014	(Republic of Ireland) Aiden McGeady	(Russia) Spartak Moscow	Everton	Undisclosed
11 January 2014	(United States) Oguchi Onyewu	Unattached	Sheffield Wednesday	Free
11 January 2014	Adam Smith	Leicester City	Stevenage	Loan
13 January 2014	(France) Nouha Dicko	Wigan Athletic	Wolverhampton Wanderers	Undisclosed
13 January 2014	(Argentina) Jonás Gutiérrez	Newcastle United	Norwich City	Loan
13 January 2014	Uche Ikpeazu	Watford	Crewe Alexandra	Loan
13 January 2014	Alex Marrow	Blackburn Rovers	Fleetwood Town	Loan
14 January 2014	Darren Ambrose	Birmingham City	(Greece) Apollon Smyrnis	Loan
14 January 2014	(Sweden) John Guidetti	Manchester City	Stoke City	Loan
14 January 2014	Grant Holt	Wigan Athletic	Aston Villa	Loan
14 January 2014	Brian Howard	(Bulgaria) CSKA Sofia	Birmingham City	Free
14 January 2014	(Republic of Ireland) Stephen Ireland	Aston Villa	Stoke City	Undisclosed
14 January 2014	Jeffrey Monakana	Preston North End	Brighton & Hove Albion	Undisclosed
14 January 2014	Wes Thomas	Bournemouth	Rotherham United	Undisclosed
14 January 2014	(France) Yohann Thuram-Ulien	(Belgium) Standard Liège	Charlton Athletic	Loan
15 January 2014	(Croatia) Nikica Jelavić	Everton	Hull City	Undisclosed
15 January 2014	Joe Lolley	Kidderminster Harriers	Huddersfield Town	Undisclosed
15 January 2014	(Serbia) Nemanja Matić	(Portugal) Benfica	Chelsea	£21m
15 January 2014	Kevin Phillips	Unattached	Leicester City	Free
15 January 2014	(Costa Rica) Bryan Ruiz	Fulham	(Netherlands) PSV	Loan
16 January 2014	Nathaniel Chalobah	Chelsea	Middlesbrough	Loan
16 January 2014	(Egypt) Adam El-Abd	Brighton & Hove Albion	Bristol City	Undisclosed
16 January 2014	Wes Fogden	Bournemouth	Portsmouth	Free
16 January 2014	(South Korea) Ji Dong-won	Sunderland	(Germany) FC Augsburg	Undisclosed
16 January 2014	Liam Lawrence	(Greece) PAOK	Barnsley	Free
16 January 2014	Nicky Maynard	(Wales) Cardiff City	Wigan Athletic	Loan
16 January 2014	Aaron McLean	Hull City	Bradford City	Undisclosed
16 January 2014	Nick Pope	Charlton Athletic	York City	Loan
17 January 2014	(Ivory Coast) Zoumana Bakayogo	Leicester City	Yeovil Town	Loan
17 January 2014	Ryan Bertrand	Chelsea	Aston Villa	Loan
17 January 2014	(Republic of Ireland) Michael Drennan	Aston Villa	Carlisle United	Loan
17 January 2014	Ryan Fredericks	Tottenham Hotspur	Millwall	Loan
17 January 2014	(Republic of Ireland) Shane Long	West Bromwich Albion	Hull City	Undisclosed
17 January 2014	Jimmy McNulty	Barnsley	Bury	Free
17 January 2014	Jordan Mustoe	Wigan Athletic	Wycombe Wanderers	Loan
17 January 2014	Luke O'Neill	Burnley	Southend United	Loan
17 January 2014	Matthew Parsons	Crystal Palace	Plymouth Argyle	Undisclosed
17 January 2014	David Perkins	Barnsley	Blackpool	Free
17 January 2014	(Romania) Gabriel Tamaș	Unattached	Doncaster Rovers	Free
17 January 2014	Blair Turgott	West Ham United	Rotherham United	Loan
18 January 2014	(Brazil) Anderson	Manchester United	(Italy) Fiorentina	Loan
18 January 2014	(Belgium) Kevin De Bruyne	Chelsea	(Germany) VfL Wolfsburg	Undisclosed
20 January 2014	DJ Campbell	Blackburn Rovers	Millwall	Loan
20 January 2014	(Portugal) Tiago Ilori	Liverpool	(Spain) Granada	Loan
20 January 2014	(Spain) Rubén Rochina	Blackburn Rovers	(Spain) Rayo Vallecano	Loan
20 January 2014	(Argentina) Santiago Vergini	(Argentina) Estudiantes	Sunderland	Loan
20 January 2014	Sam Walker	Chelsea	Colchester United	Free
21 January 2014	(United States) Juan Agudelo	(United States) New England Revolution	Stoke City	Free
21 January 2014	(United States) Juan Agudelo	Stoke City	(Netherlands) Utrecht	Loan
21 January 2014	Kwesi Appiah	Crystal Palace	Notts County	Loan
21 January 2014	(Slovakia) Albert Rusnák	Manchester City	Birmingham City	Loan
21 January 2014	(Norway) Sondre Tronstad	(Norway) Start	Huddersfield Town	Undisclosed
21 January 2014	(Argentina) Óscar Ustari	(Spain) Almería	Sunderland	Free
21 January 2014	Elliott Kebbie	(Spain) Atlético Madrid	Hull City	Free
22 January 2014	Billy Knott	Sunderland	Port Vale	Loan
22 January 2014	(Trinidad and Tobago) Jason Scotland	Barnsley	(Scotland) Hamilton	Free
22 January 2014	Billy Sharp	Southampton	Doncaster Rovers	Loan
23 January 2014	Jack Barmby	Manchester United	Hartlepool United	Loan
23 January 2014	(Scotland) Fraser Fyvie	Wigan Athletic	Shrewsbury Town	Loan
23 January 2014	Anthony Jeffrey	Arsenal	Wycombe Wanderers	Free
23 January 2014	Josh McEachran	Chelsea	Wigan Athletic	Loan
23 January 2014	Ishmael Miller	Nottingham Forest	Yeovil Town	Loan
23 January 2014	(Germany) Nick Proschwitz	Hull City	Barnsley	Loan
23 January 2014	Adam Reach	Middlesbrough	Bradford City	Loan
23 January 2014	Richard Smallwood	Middlesbrough	Rotherham United	Loan
23 January 2014	(Netherlands) Kelle Roos	Nuneaton Town	Derby County	Undisclosed
23 January 2014	Michael Smith	Charlton Athletic	Swindon Town	Undisclosed
23 January 2014	Luke Williams	Middlesbrough	Hartlepool United	Loan
24 January 2014	Chris Atkinson	Huddersfield Town	Bradford City	Loan
24 January 2014	(Spain) Daniel Ayala	Norwich City	Middlesbrough	£350,000
24 January 2014	Lee Barnard	Southampton	Southend United	Loan
24 January 2014	Kyle Bennett	Doncaster Rovers	Bradford City	Loan
24 January 2014	(Norway) Jo Inge Berget	(Norway) Molde	(Wales) Cardiff City	Undisclosed
24 January 2014	John Brayford	(Wales) Cardiff City	Sheffield United	Loan
24 January 2014	(Scotland) David Goodwillie	Blackburn Rovers	Blackpool	Loan
24 January 2014	(Scotland) Andy Halliday	Middlesbrough	Blackpool	Loan
24 January 2014	(Scotland) Bob Harris	Blackpool	Sheffield United	Loan
24 January 2014	(Portugal) Edinho Júnior	Blackburn Rovers	(United States) Harrisburg City Islanders	Free
24 January 2014	Tony McMahon	Sheffield United	Blackpool	Loan
24 January 2014	(Portugal) Fábio Nunes	Blackburn Rovers	(Italy) Latina	Free
24 January 2014	Alie Sesay	Leicester City	Colchester United	Loan
24 January 2014	(Ivory Coast) Lacina Traoré	(France) Monaco	Everton	Loan
25 January 2014	(Italy) Marco Borriello	(Italy) Roma	West Ham United	Loan
25 January 2014	(Spain) Juan Mata	Chelsea	Manchester United	£37.1m
25 January 2014	(Italy) Antonio Nocerino	(Italy) Milan	West Ham United	Loan
25 January 2014	Bradley Orr	Blackburn Rovers	(Canada) Toronto FC	Loan
26 January 2014	Frazer Richardson	Middlesbrough	Ipswich Town	Loan
26 January 2014	(Egypt) Mohamed Salah	(Switzerland) Basel	Chelsea	£11m
27 January 2014	(Ghana) Michael Essien	Chelsea	(Italy) Milan	Undisclosed
27 January 2014	(Turkey) Anıl Koç	(Belgium) Standard Liège	Charlton Athletic	Loan
27 January 2014	(France) David Ngog	Bolton Wanderers	(Wales) Swansea City	Undisclosed
27 January 2014	(Republic of Ireland) Shaun Williams	Milton Keynes Dons	Millwall	Undisclosed
27 January 2014	Nico Yennaris	Arsenal	Brentford	Undisclosed
28 January 2014	(France) Bryan Dabo	(France) Montpellier	Blackburn Rovers	Loan
28 January 2014	Wade Elliott	Birmingham City	Bristol City	Loan
28 January 2014	(Brazil) Fabio	Manchester United	(Wales) Cardiff City	Undisclosed
28 January 2014	(Wales) Emyr Huws	Manchester City	Birmingham City	Loan
28 January 2014	Lukas Jutkiewicz	Middlesbrough	Bolton Wanderers	Loan
28 January 2014	(Trinidad and Tobago) Kenwyne Jones	Stoke City	(Wales) Cardiff City	Swap
28 January 2014	(Scotland) Adam King	(Scotland) Hearts	(Wales) Swansea City	£150,000
28 January 2014	(Nigeria) Peter Odemwingie	(Wales) Cardiff City	Stoke City	Swap
28 January 2014	Adam Smith	Tottenham Hotspur	Bournemouth	Undisclosed
29 January 2014	(France) Yohan Cabaye	Newcastle United	(France) Paris Saint-Germain	£19m
29 January 2014	(Netherlands) Luuk de Jong	(Germany) Borussia Mönchengladbach	Newcastle United	Loan
29 January 2014	(Algeria) Rafik Djebbour	(Greece) Olympiakos	Nottingham Forest	Undisclosed
29 January 2014	Jack Hunt	Crystal Palace	Barnsley	Loan
29 January 2014	(Republic of Ireland) Aiden O'Brien	Millwall	Torquay United	Loan
29 January 2014	(Hungary) Dániel Tőzsér	(Italy) Genoa	Watford	Loan
30 January 2014	Benik Afobe	Arsenal	Sheffield Wednesday	Loan
30 January 2014	Nathan Delfouneso	Aston Villa	Coventry City	Loan
30 January 2014	(Scotland) Coll Donaldson	(Scotland) Livingston	Queens Park Rangers	Undisclosed
30 January 2014	(Scotland) Danny Fox	Southampton	Nottingham Forest	Loan
30 January 2014	(Iran) Reza Ghoochannejhad	(Belgium) Standard Liège	Charlton Athletic	Undisclosed
30 January 2014	(Senegal) Kévin Gomis	(France) Nice	Nottingham Forest	Loan
30 January 2014	(Denmark) William Kvist	(Germany) VfB Stuttgart	Fulham	Loan
30 January 2014	(Wales) Lee Lucas	(Wales) Swansea City	Cheltenham Town	Loan
30 January 2014	Aaron Martin	Southampton	Birmingham City	Free
30 January 2014	Paul McCallum	West Ham United	(Scotland) Hearts	Loan
30 January 2014	Tony McMahon	Sheffield United	Blackpool	Undisclosed
30 January 2014	Simon Moore	(Wales) Cardiff City	Bristol City	Loan
30 January 2014	(Senegal) Alfred N'Diaye	Sunderland	(Spain) Betis	Loan
30 January 2014	(France) Loïc Nego	(Hungary) Újpest	Charlton Athletic	Undisclosed
30 January 2014	Joe Pigott	Charlton Athletic	Gillingham	Loan
30 January 2014	(Ivory Coast) Abdul Razak	(Russia) Anzhi Makhachkala	West Ham United	Undisclosed
30 January 2014	(Argentina) Ignacio Scocco	(Brazil) Internacional	Sunderland	Undisclosed
30 January 2014	Jordan Spence	West Ham United	Milton Keynes Dons	Loan
30 January 2014	Dale Stephens	Charlton Athletic	Brighton & Hove Albion	Undisclosed
30 January 2014	(Morocco) Adel Taarabt	Queens Park Rangers	(Italy) Milan	Loan
30 January 2014	George Thorne	West Bromwich Albion	Derby County	Loan
30 January 2014	(Scotland) Iain Turner	Unattached	Barnsley	Free
31 January 2014	Ben Alnwick	Charlton Athletic	Leyton Orient	Undisclosed
31 January 2014	(Colombia) Pablo Armero	(Italy) Napoli	West Ham United	Loan
31 January 2014	Ross Atkins	Derby County	Crawley Town	Loan
31 January 2014	Marvin Bartley	Burnley	Leyton Orient	Free
31 January 2014	(Luxembourg) Yannick Bastos	(Luxembourg) Differdange	Bolton Wanderers	Undisclosed
31 January 2014	(Republic of the Congo) Thievy Bifouma	(Spain) Espanyol	West Bromwich Albion	Loan
31 January 2014	Tyler Blackett	Manchester United	Birmingham City	Loan
31 January 2014	Daniel Boateng	Arsenal	(Scotland) Hibernian	Loan
31 January 2014	(Scotland) Liam Bridcutt	Brighton & Hove Albion	Sunderland	£3m
31 January 2014	(Ghana) Prince Buaben	Carlisle United	(Scotland) Partick Thistle	Loan
31 January 2014	(Republic of Ireland) Sam Byrne	Manchester United	Carlisle United	Loan
31 January 2014	(Spain) José Campaña	Crystal Palace	(Germany) 1. FC Nürnberg	Loan
31 January 2014	(South Korea) Park Chu-young	Arsenal	Watford	Loan
31 January 2014	Larnell Cole	Manchester United	Fulham	Undisclosed
31 January 2014	(Scotland) Craig Conway	(Wales) Cardiff City	Blackburn Rovers	Undisclosed
31 January 2014	Scott Dann	Blackburn Rovers	Crystal Palace	Undisclosed
31 January 2014	(Wales) Craig Davies	Bolton Wanderers	Preston North End	Loan
31 January 2014	Mark Davies	Nottingham Forest	(Scotland) St Johnstone	Loan
31 January 2014	(Brazil) Dellatorre	(Brazil) Desportivo Brasil	Queens Park Rangers	Loan
31 January 2014	(Senegal) Modibo Diakité	Sunderland	(Italy) Fiorentina	Loan
31 January 2014	(Mali) Samba Diakité	Queens Park Rangers	Watford	Loan
31 January 2014	(Scotland) Stephen Dobbie	Crystal Palace	Blackpool	Loan
31 January 2014	(Northern Ireland) Rory Donnelly	(Wales) Swansea City	Coventry City	Loan
31 January 2014	(Republic of Ireland) Kevin Doyle	Wolverhampton Wanderers	Queens Park Rangers	Loan
31 January 2014	(Belgium) Charni Ekangamene	Manchester United	Carlisle United	Loan
31 January 2014	(Ghana) Emmanuel Frimpong	Arsenal	Barnsley	Undisclosed
31 January 2014	(Scotland) Jay Fulton	(Scotland) Falkirk	(Wales) Swansea City	£200,000
31 January 2014	(Australia) Curtis Good	Newcastle United	(Scotland) Dundee United	Loan
31 January 2014	Danny Graham	Sunderland	Middlesbrough	Loan
31 January 2014	(Belgium) Faris Haroun	Middlesbrough	Blackpool	Free
31 January 2014	(Scotland) Bob Harris	Blackpool	Sheffield United	Undisclosed
31 January 2014	(Netherlands) John Heitinga	Everton	Fulham	Free
31 January 2014	(Wales) Wayne Hennessey	Wolverhampton Wanderers	Crystal Palace	£3m
31 January 2014	Jack Hobbs	Hull City	Nottingham Forest	Undisclosed
31 January 2014	(Germany) Lewis Holtby	Tottenham Hotspur	Fulham	Loan
31 January 2014	(Northern Ireland) Aaron Hughes	Fulham	Queens Park Rangers	Undisclosed
31 January 2014	Tom Ince	Blackpool	Crystal Palace	Loan
31 January 2014	(Brazil) Iriney	Watford	(Spain) Mallorca	Loan
31 January 2014	Sam Johnstone	Manchester United	Doncaster Rovers	Loan
31 January 2014	(France) Gaël Kakuta	Chelsea	(Italy) Lazio	Loan
31 January 2014	(Sweden) Kim Källström	(Russia) Spartak Moscow	Arsenal	Loan
31 January 2014	Will Keane	Manchester United	Queens Park Rangers	Loan
31 January 2014	(Wales) Tom Lawrence	Mancherster United	Yeovil Town	Loan
31 January 2014	(Wales) Joe Ledley	(Scotland) Celtic	Crystal Palace	Undisclosed
31 January 2014	(Mali) Modibo Maïga	West Ham United	Queens Park Rangers	Loan
31 January 2014	(Sweden) David Moberg Karlsson	Sunderland	(Scotland) Kilmarnock	Loan
31 January 2014	(Republic of Ireland) Andy Keogh	Millwall	Blackpool	Loan
31 January 2014	(France) Yann Kermogant	Charlton Athletic	Bournemouth	Undisclosed
31 January 2014	(Italy) Federico Macheda	Manchester United	Birmingham City	Loan
31 January 2014	Joseph Mills	Burnley	Shrewsbury Town	Loan
31 January 2014	(Greece) Kostas Mitroglou	(Greece) Olympiakos	Fulham	£11m
31 January 2014	George Moncur	West Ham United	(Scotland) Partick Thistle	Loan
31 January 2014	Hayden Mullins	Birmingham City	Notts County	Loan
31 January 2014	Michael Ngoo	Liverpool	Walsall	Loan
31 January 2014	(Italy) Dani Osvaldo	Southampton	(Italy) Juventus	Loan
31 January 2014	(Poland) Piotr Parzyszek	(Netherlands) De Graafschap	Charlton Athletic	Undisclosed
31 January 2014	George Porter	Burnley	Rochdale	Free
31 January 2014	Jason Puncheon	Sunderland	Crystal Palace	£1.75m
31 January 2014	(Spain) David Rodríguez	(Spain) Celta Vigo	Brighton & Hove Albion	Free
31 January 2014	Jack Rudge	Manchester United	Torquay United	Loan
31 January 2014	(Switzerland) Philippe Senderos	Fulham	(Spain) Valencia	Undisclosed
31 January 2014	(Czech Republic) Jindrich Stanek	(Czech Republic) Sparta Prague	Everton	Undisclosed
31 January 2014	Jon Stead	Huddersfield Town	Oldham Athletic	Loan
31 January 2014	Tom Thorpe	Manchester United	Birmingham City	Loan
31 January 2014	Lee Tomlin	Peterborough United	Middlesbrough	Loan
31 January 2014	Liam Trotter	Millwall	Bolton Wanderers	Loan
31 January 2014	Ryan Tunnicliffe	Manchester United	Fulham	Undisclosed
31 January 2014	Ed Upson	Yeovil Town	Millwall	Undisclosed
31 January 2014	(Wales) David Vaughan	Sunderland	Nottingham Forest	Loan
31 January 2014	Martyn Waghorn	Leicester City	Wigan Athletic	Loan
31 January 2014	Duncan Watmore	Sunderland	(Scotland) Hibernian	Loan
31 January 2014	Ben Whitfield	Guiseley	Bournemouth	Free
31 January 2014	(Scotland) Martin Woods	Unattached	Barnsley	Free
31 January 2014	(France) Kurt Zouma	(France) Saint-Étienne	Chelsea	£12m
31 January 2014	(France) Kurt Zouma	Chelsea	(France) Saint-Étienne	Loan
31 January 2014	Wilfried Zaha	Manchester United	(Wales) Cardiff City	Loan

^{a} Player officially joined his club after the transfer window opened on 1 January 2014.
^{b} Player officially joined his club on 28 February 2014.
