= Henrique Nogueira =

Portuguese footballer

Henrique
Personal information
- Full name: Nuno Henrique Gonçalves Nogueira
- Date of birth: 19 October 1986 (age 40)
- Place of birth: Fafe, Portugal
- Height: 1.87 m (6 ft 1 1/2 in)
- Position: Centre-back

Youth career
- 1997–1999: Ases São Jorge
- 1999–2001: Pasteleira
- 2001–2002: Vasco Gama Fafe
- 2002–2005: Fafe

Senior career*
Years	Team	Apps	(Gls)
2005–2008	Fafe	43	(4)
2008–2010	Aves	27	(1)
2010–2011	Feirense	19	(3)
2011–2012	Braga	0	(0)
2011–2012	→ Feirense (loan)	7	(0)
2012	Académica	2	(0)
2012–2014	Blackburn Rovers	0	(0)
2013	→ Arouca (loan)	1	(0)
2014	Jagiellonia Białystok	0	(0)
2014	Jagiellonia II	6	(0)
2014–2015	Penafiel	1	(0)
2015	Feirense	21	(1)
2015–2018	Boavista	48	(5)
2018	Pafos	0	(0)
2018–2022	Lusitânia	56	(4)
Total		231	(18)
- * Club domestic league appearances and goals

Nuno Henrique Gonçalves Nogueira (born 19 October 1986), known as Henrique, is a Portuguese former professional footballer who played as a central defender.

== Club career ==
Henrique was born in Fafe, Braga District. After completing his youth career at the club he made his senior debut with AD Fafe, spending three seasons in the third division. In summer 2008 he joined C.D. Aves of the Segunda Liga, being almost exclusively a backup during his spell.

Henrique played with C.D. Feirense in 2010–11, starting in 18 of his league appearances and scoring three goals as the club returned to the Primeira Liga after 22 years. In the ensuing off-season he signed for S.C. Braga for three years, being immediately loaned to his previous team and being rarely used as the campaign ended in relegation (ten competitive matches, due to injury).

On 28 June 2012, after buying out his Braga contract, Henrique joined Académica de Coimbra on a two-year deal. In the last minutes of the summer transfer window, however, he moved to the Football League Championship with Blackburn Rovers, sharing teams with several compatriots including former Braga teammate Nuno Gomes.

On 1 July 2013, Henrique signed for F.C. Arouca in his country's top division, on a season-long loan. He returned to Ewood Park in January of the following year and, on 28 February, moved to Jagiellonia Białystok of the Polish Ekstraklasa. During this timeframe, where he also represented F.C. Penafiel and Feirense, his career was marred by several injury problems.

From 2015 to 2018, Henrique competed in the Portuguese top tier with Boavista FC. He scored five goals from 52 competitive appearances during his spell at the Estádio do Bessa.

== Career statistics ==
As of 18 August 2013

Appearances and goals by club, season and competition
Club	Season	League			National cup		League cup		Continental		Other		Total	
Club	Season	Division	Apps	Goals	Apps	Goals	Apps	Goals	Apps	Goals	Apps	Goals	Apps	Goals
Fafe	2005–06	Segunda Divisão	19	0	1	0	—		—		—		20	0
Fafe	2006–07	Segunda Divisão	15	2	0	0	—		—		—		15	2
Fafe	2007–08	Segunda Divisão	9	2	1	0	—		—		—		10	2
Fafe	Total		43	4	2	0	—		—		—		45	4
Aves	2008–09	Segunda Liga	15	0	1	0	0	0	—		—		16	0
Aves	2009–10	Segunda Liga	12	1	1	0	0	0	—		—		13	1
Aves	Total		27	1	2	0	0	0	—		—		29	1
Feirense	2010–11	Segunda Liga	19	3	2	0	3	0	—		—		24	3
Braga	2011–12	Primeira Liga	0	0	0	0	0	0	0	0	—		0	0
Feirense	2011–12	Primeira Liga	7	0	1	0	2	0	—		—		10	0
Académica	2012–13	Primeira Liga	2	0	0	0	0	0	—		0	0	2	0
Blackburn Rovers	2012–13	Championship	0	0	0	0	0	0	—		—		0	0
Arouca	2013–14	Primeira Liga	1	0	0	0	0	0	—		—		1	0
Jagiellonia Białystok	2013–14	Ekstraklasa	0	0	0	0	0	0	—		—		0	0
Jagiellonia II	2013–14	III liga	6	0	—		—		—		—		6	0
Career total			105	8	7	0	5	0	0	0	0	0	117	8
