= Paulo Jorge (footballer, born 1993) =

Portuguese footballer

Personal information
- Full name: Paulo Jorge Gomes Pereira
- Date of birth: 18 January 1993 (age 33)
- Place of birth: Braga, Portugal
- Height: 1.85 m (6 ft 1 in)
- Position: Midfielder

Team information
- Current team: Espinho
- Number: 6

Youth career
- 2006–2007: Braga
- 2007–2012: Porto

Senior career*
Years	Team	Apps	(Gls)
2012–2015	Blackburn Rovers	2	(0)
2015–2017	TuS Erndtebrück	33	(1)
2017	Gaz Metan Mediaș	2	(0)
2018–2019	Trofense	42	(1)
2019–	Espinho	13	(0)

International career
2008–2009	Portugal U16	6	(0)
2009–2010	Portugal U17	12	(0)
2011	Portugal U18	8	(0)
2011–2012	Portugal U19	8	(0)
- * Club domestic league appearances and goals as of 23:07, 10 December 2019 (UTC)

Paulo Jorge Gomes Pereira (born 18 January 1993) is a Portuguese footballer who plays as a midfielder for S.C. Espinho. He previously played at fully professional level for Blackburn Rovers and Gaz Metan Mediaș.

== Club career ==
Born in Braga, Jorge spent his youth career with S.C. Braga's youth team and F.C. Porto's youth team. on 27 July 2012, he signed for English club Blackburn Rovers of the Championship. On 18 August 2012, he made his league debut for Rovers against Ipswich Town coming on as an 83rd-minute substitute for Danny Murphy.

== International career ==
Paulo Jorge has represented Portugal at under-17 and twice at under-19 level. He played 90 minutes for the U19s in a 6–0 win away at San Marino on 6 November 2011 and came on as substitute in a 3–3 draw at home to Hungary three days later.

== Career statistics ==
=== Club ===
As of 1 July 2015

Appearances and goals by club, season and competition
Club	Season	League		National Cup		League Cup		Continental		Total	
Club	Season	Apps	Goals	Apps	Goals	Apps	Goals	Apps	Goals	Apps	Goals
Blackburn Rovers	2012–13	2	0	0	0	1	0	–		3	0
Career total		2	0	0	0	1	0	0	0	3	0
