= Edinho Júnior =

Portuguese footballer

Personal information
- Full name: Edon Júnior Viegas Amaral
- Date of birth: 7 March 1994 (age 32)
- Place of birth: Faro, Portugal
- Height: 1.80 m (5 ft 11 in)
- Position: Forward

Team information
- Current team: Quarteirense

Youth career
- 2007–2012: Olhanense

Senior career*
Years	Team	Apps	(Gls)
2012–2014	Blackburn Rovers	1	(0)
2013	→ Shillong Lajong (loan)	6	(2)
2013	→ Whitehawk (loan)	3	(0)
2014	Harrisburg Islanders	5	(0)
2014–2016	Farense	33	(4)
2016	TuS Erndtebrück	16	(2)
2017	Almancilense	11	(3)
2018	Gaz Metan Mediaș	1	(0)
2018–2025	Ferreiras	27+	(3+)
2025–	Quarteirense	0	(0)

International career
2013	Portugal U19	8	(0)
- * Club domestic league appearances and goals as of 13:15, 10 May 2019 (UTC)

Edon Júnior Viegas Amaral (born 7 March 1994), known as Edinho Júnior, is a Portuguese professional footballer who plays as a forward for Quarteirense.

== Career ==
Edinho started his career in Portuguese club S.C. Olhanense's youth team where he caught the eye of Scottish Premier League side Celtic, who were rumored to be interested in signing the player for £500,000.

=== Blackburn Rovers ===
In June 2012, Edinho went on trial at English club Blackburn Rovers and signed for the club on 25 July 2012 after impressing in the trial, for an undisclosed fee on a three-year contract. Edinho was allocated the squad number 19 and made his first team debut in a 2–1 win against Leicester City at Ewood Park, Edinho started the game and played in the first half, before he was replaced by David Goodwillie for the second half. On 13 February 2013 Edinho signed on loan for an I-League club Shillong Lajong.

=== Shillong Lajong (loan) ===
Edinho joined the I-League side Shillong Lajong on loan on 15 February 2013 until 30 June 2013. He made his debut against Pune FC on 24 March 2013. He scored two goals as the match ended 2–2. In total, he made six appearances and scored two goals for Shillong Lajong. FIFA has made a documentary on him and his dancing skills for the club and released it as FIFA Football Mundial- A dancing 'Hero' in India.

=== Whitehawk (loan) ===
On 19 July 2013, Edinho joined newly promoted Conference South side Whitehawk on a one-month loan deal. On 18 September 2013, he returned to Blackburn after making three appearances for Whitehawk.

=== Harrisburg City Islanders ===
On 24 January 2014, Edinho joined USL Pro side Harrisburg City Islanders on a free transfer.

=== Farense ===
In July 2014, Edinho joined Segunda Liga side Farense.

After seven years with Ferreiras, Edinho joined Quarteirense in July 2025.

== International career ==
Edinho made his debut for Portugal U19 on 8 February 2013, coming on as a 58th-minute substitute in a 3–0 friendly win over Norway U19. Then, in June 2013, he played in 2013 UEFA European Under-19 Football Championship elite qualification against Bulgaria U19, a 7–0 win, and Czech Republic U19, a 4–1 win, coming on as substitute in both games.

== Personal life ==
Edinho is the son of former Brazilian footballer Edon Amaral Neto.He is married with Bianca Iulia Safta Amaral since 2021.

== Career statistics ==
As of 10 October 2013

Appearances and goals by club, season and competition
Club	Season	League (Note: Appearances in The Football League)		FA Cup		League Cup		Other (Note: Appearances in Football League play-offs)		Total	
Club	Season	Apps	Goals	Apps	Goals	Apps	Goals	Apps	Goals	Apps	Goals
Blackburn Rovers	2012–13	1	0	0	0	1	0	0	0	2	0
Shillong Lajong	2012–13	6	2	0	0	0	0	0	0	6	2
Whitehawk	2013–14	3	0	0	0	0	0	0	0	3	0
Career total		10	2	0	0	1	0	0	0	11	2
