= 2015–16 Blackburn Rovers F.C. season =

Blackburn Rovers
2015–16 season
- Manager: Gary Bowyer (until 10 November 2015); Paul Lambert (from 15 November 2015)
- Stadium: Ewood Park
- Championship: 15th
- Football League Cup: First round (eliminated by Shrewsbury Town)
- FA Cup: Fifth round (eliminated by West Ham United)
- Top goalscorer: League: Jordan Rhodes (10); All: Jordan Rhodes (11)
- Average home league attendance: 14,171
Home colours	Away colours

The 2015–16 season is Blackburn Rovers' 128th season as a professional football club and its fourth playing in the Championship. Along with competing in the Championship, the club will also participate in the FA Cup and League Cup. The season covers the period from 1 July 2015 to 30 June 2016.

== Summer Activity ==
On 12 May Rovers announced a new sponsorship deal with Dafabet.

On 16 May Rovers announced their retained list and Matthew Kilgallon & Lee Williamson had their contracts extended by a further 12 months. It was also confirmed long serving players David Dunn & Paul Robinson would be leaving the club upon the expiration of their contracts whilst Josh King & youth player Darragh Lenihan who made his 1st team appearance last season had been offered new contracts. Chris Taylor & Luke Varney were free to talk to other clubs.

On 28 May it was announced that Rovers forward Josh King would join Premier League new boys AFC Bournemouth upon the expiration of his contract.

On 25 June it was announced Luke Varney will undergo rehab at Ipswich Town upon leaving Rovers.

On 26 June Rovers announced Tom Cairney will be joining Fulham.

On 1 July Rovers announced Ryan Nyambe has signed his first professional contract, the defender has signed a 3-year deal, Also penning new deals at are Ryan Crump, Jack Doyle, Mark Edgar, Anton Forrester, Sam Joel, Sam Lavelle and Connor Thomson. They have each signed new one-year contracts, whilst Hyuga Tanner and Luke Wall have signed extensions to their Academy scholarships.

On 1 July Rovers announced Darragh Lenihan has signed a one-year deal.

On 1 July Rovers announced Josh Morris will be joining Bradford City.

On 2 July Rovers announced Chris Taylor had signed a new one-year deal.

On 8 July Rovers announced Leon Best had been released by mutual consent.

On 21 July 2015 Rovers announced their first and second signings of the summer transfer window, with the free agents Sacha Petshi signing a one-year deal with an option of a second year and fellow Frenchmen Bengali-Fodé Koita signing a two-year deal with Rovers.

On 31 July Rovers announced Jake Kean had been released by mutual consent.

On 31 July Rovers announced Rudy Gestede had joined Aston Villa.

On 5 August Rovers announced their third signing of the summer with free agent Danny Guthrie signing a two-year deal.

On 6 August Rovers announced their fourth signing of the summer with free agent Nathan Delfouneso signing a one-year deal.

On 10 August Rovers announced the loan signing of Modou Barrow from Swansea City until the 10 November.

On 11 August Rovers announced the signing of Reading center midfielder Hope Akpan after his contract was terminated by Reading, and completed a two-year contract to join Rovers.

On 21 August Rovers announced the loan signing of Tom Lawrence from Leicester City until 3 January.

== Autumn activity ==
On 11 November Rovers confirmed Gary Bowyer had left the club, Assistant manager Terry McPhillips, First team coaches Craig Short & Tony Grant & goalkeeping coach John Keeley also left with immediate effect.

On 15 November Rovers confirmed Paul Lambert has been appointed as new manager, with Alan Irvine as his Assistant manager, Rob Kelly as a coach & Laurence Batty as goalkeeping coach.

On 20 November Rovers announced Corry Evans has committed his long-term future to the club signing a contract extension until the summer of 2019.

On 24 November Rovers announced the loan signing of Doneil Henry from West Ham United until 3 January.

On 24 November Rovers announced John O'Sullivan has signed a contract extension until the summer of 2017.

On 26 November Rovers announced John O'Sullivan had joined Rochdale on loan until 3 January.

On 26 November Rovers announced Anton Forrester had joined Morecambe on loan until 3 January.

On 3 December Rovers announce they are now compliant with the Football League's Financial Fair Play regulations and will have their transfer embargo lifted.

On 10 December Rovers announced Craig Conway has committed his long-term future to the club signing a contract extension until the summer of 2018.

== Winter Activity ==
On 5 January Rovers announced that Tom Lawrence will remain on loan for a further month, until 31 January.

On 5 January Rovers announced the signing of Elliott Bennett on a 2 and half year deal, for an undisclosed fee from Norwich City.

On 15 January Rovers announced the signing of Simeon Jackson on a short-term deal until the end of the season, on a free transfer following his release from Barnsley.

On 15 January Rovers announced John O'Sullivan had joined Bury on loan until the 13 February.

On 20 January Rovers announced signed of Danny Graham on loan from Sunderland until end of the season.

On 20 January Rovers announced the signing of Elliott Ward on a 2 and half year deal, on a free transfer from Bournemouth.

On 26 January Rovers announced Marcus Olsson will move to Derby County for an undisclosed fee.

On 27 January Rovers announced they have reached an agreement with Turkish team Kasımpaşa for the transfer of Bengali-Fodé Koita for a fee of 320,000 Euros.

On 29 January Rovers announced signed of Tony Watt on loan from Charlton Athletic until end of the season, with a fee agree to sign permanently in summer.

On 1 February Rovers announced Jordan Rhodes will join Middlesbrough for £9,000,000 with £2,000,000 add ons.

On 1 February Rovers announced Sacha Petshi has joined Créteil.

On 1 February Rovers announced signed of Jordi Gómez on loan from Sunderland until end of the season.

On 13 February Rovers announced signed of Matt Grimes on loan from Swansea City on a 93-day loan.

On 26 February Rovers announced Darragh Lenihan signed a new three-and-a-half-year deal.

== Spring activity ==
On 17 March Rovers announced Chris Taylor, who is out of contract in the summer, has joined Millwall on loan until end of season.

On 18 March Paul Lambert says he will make the decision on the players who are out of contract in the summer when his budget is confirmed, Simon Eastwood, Tommy Spurr, Matthew Kilgallon, Chris Taylor, Lee Williamson, Nathan Delfouneso & Chris Brown are all out of contract in the summer.

On 18 March Rovers announced Nathan Delfouneso has joined Bury on loan until 19 April.

On 28 April Rovers announced that Paul Lambert will be leaving at the end of the current season.

== Pre-Season friendlies ==
On 15 May 2015, Blackburn Rovers announced six pre-season friendlies, Wigan Athletic, Bury, Oldham Athletic, Accrington Stanley, Rochdale and Tranmere Rovers.

11 July 2015 Friendly	Accrington Stanley	0–2	Blackburn Rovers	Accrington
15:00 BST		Report	Furman (trialist) 12'; Conway 81'	Stadium: Crown Ground; Attendance: 1,497 (816 Rovers supporters)

21 July 2015 Friendly	Rochdale	2–1	Blackburn Rovers	Rochdale
19:45 BST	Henderson 32', 83'	Report	Williamson 19'	Stadium: Spotland; Attendance: 1,369

24 July 2015 Friendly	Tranmere Rovers	0–2	Blackburn Rovers	Tranmere
19:45 BST		Report	Sarpong (trialist) 76'; Mahoney 77'	Stadium: Prenton Park; Attendance: 1,789

25 July 2015 Friendly	Oldham Athletic	0–2	Blackburn Rovers	Oldham
15:00 BST		Report	Delfouneso 58'; Conway 84'	Stadium: Boundary Park; Attendance: 1,651 (inc. 453 Rovers supporters)

28 July 2015 Friendly	Bury	1–1	Blackburn Rovers	Bury
19:30 BST	Pope 26'	Report	Conway 65'	Stadium: The JD Stadium; Attendance: 1,696 (inc. 522 Rovers supporters); Referee: Darren Handley

1 August 2015 Friendly	Blackburn Rovers	3–0	Wigan Athletic	Blackburn
15:00 BST	Tomlinson 74'; Hanley 83'; Marshall 88'	Report		Stadium: Ewood Park; Attendance: 3,504 (inc. 557 visiting supporters)

== Championship ==
=== League table ===
Pos	Team	Pld	W	D	L	GF	GA	GD	Pts
13	Leeds United	46	14	17	15	50	58	−8	59
14	Wolverhampton Wanderers	46	14	16	16	53	58	−5	58
15	Blackburn Rovers	46	13	16	17	46	46	0	55
16	Nottingham Forest	46	13	16	17	43	47	−4	55
17	Reading	46	13	13	20	52	59	−7	52

Source: BBC Sport
Rules for classification: 1) Points; 2) Goal difference; 3) Number of goals scored

=== Result by round ===
Round	1	2	3	4	5	6	7	8	9	10	11	12	13	14	15	16	17	18	19	20	21	22	23	24	25	26	27	28	29	30	31	32	33	34	35	36	37	38	39	40	41	42	43	44	45	46
Ground	H	A	A	H	A	H	H	A	H	A	A	H	H	A	A	H	A	H	A	H	A	H	H	A	H	A	H	A	A	H	A	H	H	A	A	H	A	H	H	A	A	H	A	H	H	A
Result	W	D	L	W	D	D	D	W	W	D	L	D	L	W	L	L	D	W	W	L	W	W	L	D	L	W	L	W	L	D	W	W	D	D	L	W	W	D	D	W	D	W	L	W	W	
Position	3	7	14	11	10	9	11	7	4	5	9	10	13	12	14	16	16	13	11	14	11	9	11	13	13	11	11	11	12	12	12	10	11	12	12	10	9	9	10	10	11	8	11	9	15	

Updated to match(es) played on 16 April 2016. Source: Statto.com
A = Away; H = Home; W = Win; D = Draw; L = Loss

=== Matches ===
On 17 June 2015, the fixtures for the forthcoming season were announced.

8 August 2015 1	Blackburn Rovers	1–2	Wolverhampton Wanderers	Blackburn
15:00 BST	Conway 39'; Guthrie (yellow card) 45'; Olsson (yellow card) 68'	Report	Afobe 29'; Edwards 45'; Iorfa (yellow card) 57'; Henry (yellow card) 86'; Ojo (yellow card) 90'	Stadium: Ewood Park; Attendance: 16,159; Referee: Mark Haywood

15 August 2015 2	Huddersfield Town	1–1	Blackburn Rovers	Huddersfield
15:00 BST	Wells 10'; Hudson (yellow card) 31'; Whitehead (yellow card) 46'	Report	Delfouneso 60'	Stadium: John Smith's Stadium; Attendance: 11,338; Referee: Peter Bankes

18 August 2015 3	Blackburn Rovers	1–1	Cardiff City	Blackburn
19:45 BST	Hanley 88'; Akpan (yellow card) 79'; Duffy (yellow card) 90'	Report	Mason 5'; Connolly (yellow card) 42'; Peltier (yellow card) 53'; Morrison (yellow card) 61'	Stadium: Ewood Park; Attendance: 12,025; Referee: Scott Duncan

22 August 2015 4	Brighton & Hove Albion	1–0	Blackburn Rovers	Brighton
15:15 BST	LuaLua 35', (yellow card) 90'; Greer (yellow card) 46'; Kayal (yellow card) 72'; Hünemeier (yellow card) 75'	Report	Duffy (yellow card) 39'; Marshall (yellow card) 90'	Stadium: Falmer Stadium; Attendance: 22,659; Referee: Andy Madley

28 August 2015 5	Blackburn Rovers	0–0	Bolton Wanderers	Blackburn
19:45 BST		Report	Dervite (red card) 90'	Stadium: Ewood Park; Attendance: 14,632; Referee: Paul Tierney

13 September 2015 6	Fulham	2–1	Blackburn Rovers	Fulham
12:00 BST	McCormack 4'; Dembélé 30'	Report	Rhodes 68' (pen.)	Stadium: Craven Cottage; Attendance: 14,372; Referee: Tony Harrington

16 September 2015 7	Queens Park Rangers	2–2	Blackburn Rovers	Shepherd's Bush
19:45 BST	Henley 46' (o.g.); Onuoha 79'	Report	Duffy 14'; Rhodes 60'	Stadium: Loftus Road; Attendance: 14,007; Referee: Darren Deadman

19 September 2015 8	Blackburn Rovers	3–0	Charlton Athletic	Blackburn
15:00 BST	Rhodes 45', 75'; Hanley (yellow card) 67'; Lawrence 85'	Report		Stadium: Ewood Park; Attendance: 12,088; Referee: Carl Boyeson

26 September 2015 9	Hull City	1–1	Blackburn Rovers	Kingston upon Hull
15:00 BST	Hernández 73'	Report	Rhodes 90'	Stadium: KC Stadium; Attendance: 16,486; Referee: Andy Haines

3 October 2015 10	Blackburn Rovers	2–0	Ipswich Town	Blackburn
15:00 BST	Rhodes 12', 16'; Evans (yellow card) 53'; Henley (yellow card) 55'	Report	Touré (yellow card) 20'; Maitland-Niles (yellow card) 57'; Berra (yellow card) 64'	Stadium: Ewood Park; Attendance: 12,672; Referee: Andre Marriner

17 October 2015 11	Milton Keynes Dons	3–0	Blackburn Rovers	Milton Keynes
15:00 BST	Reeves 11' (pen.), 89'; Church 71'	Report	Henley (red card) 10'	Stadium: Stadium mk Attendance: 11,548; Referee: James Linington

21 October 2015 12	Blackburn Rovers	0–0	Derby County	Blackburn
19:45 BST	Lawrence (yellow card) 34'; Taylor (yellow card) 45'; Akpan (yellow card) 62'; Evans (yellow card) 88'	Report	Johnson (yellow card) 41'; Keogh (yellow card) 45'	Stadium: Ewood Park; Attendance: 12,968; Referee: Darren Drysdale

24 October 2015 13	Blackburn Rovers	0–1	Burnley	Blackburn
12:30 BST		Report	Arfield 63'	Stadium: Ewood Park; Attendance: 19,897; Referee: Keith Stroud

29 October 2015 14	Leeds United	0–2	Blackburn Rovers	Leeds
19:45 GMT	Bamba (yellow card) 38'	Report	Craig Conway 1', (yellow card) 90'; Rhodes 6'; Evans (yellow card) 90'	Stadium: Elland Road; Attendance: 19,666; Referee: Tim Robinson

3 November 2015 15	Birmingham City	0–0	Blackburn Rovers	Birmingham
19:45 GMT	Shinnie (yellow card) 55'; Davis (yellow card) 62'	Report	Marshall (yellow card) 70'; Henley (yellow card) 89'	Stadium: St Andrews; Attendance: 15,701; Referee: Chris Kavanagh

7 November 2015 16	Blackburn Rovers	1–1	Brentford	Blackburn
15:00 GMT	Lawrence 37'; Olsson (yellow card) 83'	Report	Yennaris (yellow card) 14'; Vibe 24'; Kerschbaumer (yellow card) 45'; Bidwell (yellow card) 90'	Stadium: Ewood Park; Attendance: 12,328; Referee: Andy Woolmer

22 November 2015 17	Preston North End	1–2	Blackburn Rovers	Preston
15:00 GMT	Huntington (yellow card) 50'; Garner (yellow card) 59', (goal) 67'; Wright (yellow card) 83' (red card) 90'	Report	Pickford 31' (o.g.); Evans (yellow card) 36'; Rhodes 52' (pen.); Koita (yellow card) 85'	Stadium: Deepdale; Attendance: 19,852; Referee: Mike Dean

29 November 2015 18	Blackburn Rovers	2–2	Sheffield Wednesday	Blackburn
15:00 GMT	Akpan 5'; Evans (yellow card) 31', (goal) 44'	Report	Hélan (yellow card) 30'; Lee (yellow card) 37'; Sougou 39'; João 84'	Stadium: Ewood Park; Attendance: 15,837; Referee: Fred Graham

5 December 2015 19	Bristol City	0–2	Blackburn Rovers	Bristol
15:00 GMT	Baker (yellow card) 16' (red card) 49'	Report	Hanley 59'; Lawrence (yellow card) 69'; Marshall 86' (pen.)	Stadium: Ashton Gate; Attendance: 15,021; Referee: Geoff Eltringham

11 December 2015 20	Blackburn Rovers	1–0	Rotherham United	Blackburn
17:45 GMT	Hyam 31' (o.g.)	Report	Broadfoot (yellow card) 74'	Stadium: Ewood Park; Attendance: 13,054; Referee: Tony Harrington

14 December 2015 21	Blackburn Rovers	0–0	Nottingham Forest	Blackburn
17:45 GMT	Guthrie (yellow card) 46'; Olsson (yellow card) 57'; Koita (yellow card) 59'	Report	Mancienne (yellow card) 18'; Tesche (yellow card) 43'	Stadium: Ewood Park; Attendance: 12,002; Referee: Chris Kavanagh

20 December 2015 22	Reading	1–0	Blackburn Rovers	Reading
15:00 GMT	Williams 11'; Robson-Kanu (yellow card) 86'	Report	Akpan (yellow card) 15'; Duffy (yellow card) 16'; Henley (yellow card) 82'; Hanley (yellow card) 88'	Stadium: Madejski Stadium; Attendance: 16,529; Referee: Peter Bankes

28 December 2015 23	Bolton Wanderers	1–0	Blackburn Rovers	Bolton
12:45 GMT	Davies (yellow card) 52'; Moxey (yellow card) 55'; Vela (yellow card) 59'; Madine 77'; Pratley (yellow card) 90'	Report	Akpan (yellow card) 53'; Duffy (yellow card) 74'; Olsson (yellow card) 90'	Stadium: Macron Stadium; Attendance: 18,048; Referee: Jon Moss

2 January 2016 24	Cardiff City	1–0	Blackburn Rovers	Cardiff
15:00 GMT	Akpan (yellow card) 39'; Duffy (yellow card) 67'	Report	Mason 58'; Ralls (yellow card) 62'	Stadium: Cardiff City Stadium; Attendance: 14,385; Referee: Andy Woolmer

12 January 2016 25	Blackburn Rovers	1–1	Queens Park Rangers	Blackburn
19:45 GMT	Akpan 85'	Report	Fer 24'	Stadium: Ewood Park; Attendance: 12,285; Referee: Eddie Ilderton

16 January 2016 26	Blackburn Rovers	0–1	Brighton & Hove Albion	Blackburn
15:00 GMT	Kilgallon (yellow card) 33'; Spurr (yellow card) 93'	Report	Zamora 3'; Ridgewell (yellow card) 57'	Stadium: Ewood Park; Attendance: 12,930; Referee: Kevin Wright

23 January 2016 27	Charlton Athletic	1–1	Blackburn Rovers	Charlton
15:00 GMT	Lennon 30'	Report	Rhodes 45'; Duffy (yellow card) 90'	Stadium: The Valley; Attendance: 13,512; Referee: Robert Lewis

6 February 2016 28	Middlesbrough	1–1	Blackburn Rovers	Middlesbrough
15:00 GMT	Sola (yellow card) 18'; Leadbitter (yellow card) 57'; Nugent 79'	Report	Marshall (yellow card) 24'; Lenihan (yellow card) 34'; Evans (yellow card) 36'; Hanley (yellow card) 64'; Gómez 72', (yellow card) 74'	Stadium: Riverside; Attendance: 26,244; Referee: Dean Whitestone

13 February 2016 29	Blackburn Rovers	0–2	Hull City	Blackburn
15:00 GMT		Report	Hernández 53'; Diamé 63'	Stadium: Ewood Park; Attendance: 13,902; Referee: Oliver Langford

16 February 2016 30	Blackburn Rovers	3–0	Fulham	Blackburn
19:45 GMT	Marshall 15' (pen.); Duffy 62'; Graham (yellow card) 65', (goal) 87'	Report	Mattila (yellow card) 52'; Fredericks (yellow card) 58'; McCormack (yellow card) 71'	Stadium: Ewood Park; Attendance: 12,157; Referee: Phil Gibbs

24 February 2016 31	Derby County	1–0	Blackburn Rovers	Derby
19:45 GMT	Butterfield 8'	Report		Stadium: Pride Park Stadium; Attendance: 27,411; Referee: Nigel Miller

27 February 2016 32	Blackburn Rovers	3–2	Milton Keynes Dons	Blackburn
15:00 GMT	Bennett (yellow card) 26', (goal) 71'; Brown (yellow card) 50'; Gómez 53', 90+3'; Leniham (yellow card) 96'	Report	Carruthers 36'; McFadzean (yellow card) 66'; Revell 86'	Stadium: Ewood Park; Attendance: 12,693; Referee: Simon Hooper

1 March 2016 33	Blackburn Rovers	2–1	Middlesbrough	Blackburn
19:45 GMT	Akpan 47'; Spurr (yellow card) 59'; Lenihan (yellow card) 69'; Graham 83'; Jackson (yellow card) 90+2'	Report	Forshaw 90+1'; Stuani (yellow card) 90+2'	Stadium: Ewood Park; Attendance: 16,601; Referee: Andy Madley

5 March 2016 34	Burnley	1–0	Blackburn Rovers	Burnley
12:30 GMT	Gray 16' (pen.); Lowton (yellow card) 63'; Ulvestad (yellow card) 90+2'	Report	Gómez (yellow card) 13'; Lenihan (yellow card) 52'; Bennett (yellow card) 91'; Watt (yellow card) 92'	Stadium: Turf Moor; Attendance: 20,478; Referee: Mike Jones

8 March 2016 35	Blackburn Rovers	2–0	Birmingham City	Blackburn
19:45 GMT	Watt 20'; Graham 23'; Gómez (yellow card) 45'; Bennett (yellow card) 45'; Evans (yellow card) 60'; Lenihan (yellow card) 73'	Report	Grounds (yellow card) 45'	Stadium: Ewood Park; Attendance: 12,774; Referee: Stuart Attwell

12 March 2016 36	Blackburn Rovers	1–2	Leeds United	Blackburn
12:30 GMT	Hanley (yellow card) 80'; Jackson 89'	Report	Bamba 34'; Antenucci 69', (yellow card) 70'; Berardi (yellow card) 80'; Bellusci (yellow card) 81'; Cook (yellow card) 92'	Stadium: Ewood Park; Attendance: 16,017; Referee: Keith Stroud

15 March 2016 37	Ipswich Town	2–0	Blackburn Rovers	Ipswich
19:45 GMT	Hyam (yellow card) 63'; Murphy 67' (pen.), 87'; Douglas (yellow card) 77'	Report	Evans (yellow card) 29'	Stadium: Portman Road; Attendance: Iain Williamson; Referee: 16,488

19 March 2016 38	Brentford	0–1	Blackburn Rovers	Brentford
15:00 GMT	McEachran (yellow card) 78'	Report	Hanley (yellow card) 28' (red card) 57'; Graham (yellow card) 63'; Akpan (yellow card) 74'; Duffy 86', (yellow card) 87'; Lenihan (yellow card) 90+2'; Watt (yellow card) 90+5'	Stadium: Griffin Park; Attendance: 10,575; Referee: Michael Bull

2 April 2016 39	Blackburn Rovers	1–2	Preston North End	Blackburn
12:30 GMT	Ward 13', (yellow card) 57'; Duffy (red card) 24'; Bennett (yellow card) 57'; Graham (yellow card) 75'	Report	Garner 24'; Gallagher (yellow card) 37'; Hugill 43'; Pearson (yellow card) 57'	Stadium: Ewood Park; Attendance: 21,029; Referee: Eddie Ilderton

5 April 2016 40	Sheffield Wednesday	2–1	Blackburn Rovers	Sheffield
19:45 GMT	Henley 51' (o.g.); Lee (yellow card) 58'; Wallace 62'	Report	Conway 46', (red card) 53'	Stadium: Hillsborough Stadium; Attendance: 21,803; Referee: David Webb

9 April 2016 41	Wolverhampton Wanderers	0–0	Blackburn Rovers	Wolverhampton
15:00 GMT	Iorfa (yellow card) 72'	Report	Lenihan (yellow card) 37'; Grimes (yellow card) 60'; Bennett (yellow card) 87'	Stadium: Molineux Stadium; Attendance: 19,538; Referee: Mark Brown

16 April 2016 42	Blackburn Rovers	0–2	Huddersfield Town	Blackburn
15:00 GMT	Hanley (yellow card) 61'; Lenihan (yellow card) 73'; Duffy (yellow card) 80'	Report	Wells 35'; Kilgallon 54' (o.g.)	Stadium: Ewood Park; Attendance: 15,061; Referee: Carl Boyeson

19 April 2016 43	Nottingham Forest	1–1	Blackburn Rovers	Nottingham
19:45 GMT	Blackstock 15'; Mills (yellow card) 49'; Gardner (yellow card) 76'	Report	Graham 22', (yellow card) 42'; Evans (yellow card) 75'; Lenihan (yellow card) 76'	Stadium: City Ground; Attendance: 16,449; Referee: Chris Kavanagh

23 April 2016 44	Blackburn Rovers	2–2	Bristol City	Blackburn
15:00 GMT	Graham 17', 80'	Report	Kodjia 70'; Wilbraham 74'; Smith (red card) 86'	Stadium: Ewood Park; Attendance: 12,752; Referee: Tim Robinson

30 April 2016 45	Rotherham United	0–1	Blackburn Rovers	Rotherham
15:00 GMT		Report	Duffy 6'	Stadium: New York Stadium; Attendance: 11,035; Referee: Steve Martin

7 May 2016 46	Blackburn Rovers	3–1	Reading	Blackburn
12:30 GMT	Bennett 8'; Graham 14'; Jackson 86'	Report	Kermorgant 31'	Stadium: Ewood Park; Attendance: 13,140; Referee: Andy Madley

== Football League Cup ==
On 16 June 2015, the first round draw was made, Blackburn Rovers were drawn at home against Shrewsbury Town.

11 August 2015 First round	Blackburn Rovers	1–2	Shrewsbury Town	Blackburn
19:45 BST	Delfouneso 30'; Spurr (yellow card) 49'	Report	Collins 9'; Barnett 32'; Tootle (yellow card) 78'; Leutwiler (yellow card) 82'	Stadium: Ewood Park; Attendance: 5,280; Referee: Geoff Eltringham

== FA Cup ==
Rovers will enter the FA Cup in the third round proper which commences on 9 January 2016. On 7 December 2015, the third round draw was made, Blackburn Rovers were drawn away against Newport County.

18 January 2016 Round 3	Newport County	1–2	Blackburn Rovers	Newport
19:15 GMT	Byrne 30'; Dymond (yellow card) 73'; Day (red card) 90'	Report	Marshall 8'; Brown (red card) 10'; Lawrence (yellow card) 47'; Rhodes 75' (pen.); Taylor (yellow card) 88'	Stadium: Rodney Parade; Attendance: 5,083; Referee: Charles Breakspear

30 January 2016 Round 4	Oxford United	0–3	Blackburn Rovers	Oxford
15:00 GMT	Mullins (yellow card) 5'; Baldock (yellow card) 64'; Kenny (yellow card) 90'	Report	Marshall 36', 76'; Spurr (yellow card) 39'; Watt 45'; Jackson (yellow card) 50'; Lenihan (yellow card) 54'; Conway (yellow card) 79'	Stadium: Kassam Stadium; Attendance: 11,647; Referee: Andy Davies

21 February 2016 Round 5	Blackburn Rovers	1–5	West Ham United	Blackburn
14:00 GMT	Marshall 20'; Taylor (yellow card) 35' (yellow-red card) 55'; Lenihan (yellow card) 84'	Report	Moses 26'; Payet 36', 90+2'; Emenike 64', 85'; Kouyaté (red card) 75'	Stadium: Ewood Park; Attendance: 18,793; Referee: Jonathan Moss

== Backroom staff ==
Position	Staff
Manager	(Scotland) Paul Lambert
Assistant Manager	(Scotland) Alan Irvine
First Team Coach	(England) Rob Kelly
Goalkeeping Coach	(England) Laurence Batty
Head of Academy	(England) Eric Kinder
Under-21 Head Coach	(Northern Ireland) Damien Johnson
Under-21 Assistant Coach	(England) David Dunn

Last updated: November 2015

== Squad statistics ==
=== Appearances and goals ===
As of 8 May 2016

No.	Pos	Nat	Player	Total		Championship		FA Cup		League Cup	
No.	Pos	Nat	Player	Apps	Goals	Apps	Goals	Apps	Goals	Apps	Goals
13	GK	(England) ENG	Simon Eastwood	0	0	0+0	0	0+0	0	0+0	0
30	GK	(England) ENG	Jason Steele	45	0	41+0	0	3+0	0	1+0	0
33	GK	(Spain) ESP	David Raya	5	0	5+0	0	0+0	0	0+0	0
2	DF	(Wales) WAL	Adam Henley	26	0	20+4	0	1+1	0	0+0	0
3	DF	(England) ENG	Tommy Spurr	26	0	20+3	0	2+0	0	1+0	0
4	DF	(England) ENG	Matthew Kilgallon	11	0	7+3	0	0+0	0	1+0	0
5	DF	(Scotland) SCO	Grant Hanley (captain)	46	2	44+0	2	2+0	0	0+0	0
15	DF	(England) ENG	Elliott Ward	9	1	6+1	1	2+0	0	0+0	0
22	DF	(Republic of Ireland) IRL	Shane Duffy	42	4	41+0	4	1+0	0	0+0	0
24	DF	(Namibia) NAM	Ryan Nyambe	1	0	0+0	0	0+0	0	1+0	0
34	DF	(England) ENG	Scott Wharton	0	0	0+0	0	0+0	0	0+0	0
36	DF	(England) ENG	Jack Doyle	0	0	0+0	0	0+0	0	0+0	0
6	MF	(England) ENG	Jason Lowe	10	0	9+1	0	0+0	0	0+0	0
10	MF	(England) ENG	Ben Marshall	48	6	44+0	2	3+0	4	1+0	0
14	MF	(Spain) ESP	Jordi Gómez (on loan from Sunderland)	19	3	17+2	3	0+0	0	0+0	0
16	MF	(England) ENG	Matt Grimes (on loan from Swansea City)	13	0	9+4	0	0+0	0	0+0	0
17	MF	(Jamaica) JAM	Lee Williamson	11	0	2+8	0	0+0	0	1+0	0
21	MF	(Nigeria) NGR	Hope Akpan	37	3	29+6	3	2+0	0	0+0	0
23	MF	(England) ENG	Danny Guthrie	17	0	10+6	0	0+0	0	0+1	0
26	MF	(Republic of Ireland) IRL	Darragh Lenihan	27	0	18+5	0	3+0	0	1+0	0
27	MF	(England) ENG	Willem Tomlinson	0	0	0+0	0	0+0	0	0+0	0
28	MF	(England) ENG	Connor Mahoney	2	0	2+0	0	0+0	0	0+0	0
29	MF	(Northern Ireland) NIR	Corry Evans	33	1	26+4	1	2+0	0	1+0	0
31	MF	(Jamaica) JAM	Elliott Bennett	24	2	16+5	2	3+0	0	0+0	0
32	MF	(Scotland) SCO	Craig Conway	38	3	29+6	3	2+1	0	0+0	0
7	FW	(England) ENG	Nathan Delfouneso	16	2	7+8	1	0+0	0	1+0	1
9	FW	(England) ENG	Chris Brown	20	0	4+13	0	2+0	0	1+0	0
12	FW	(England) ENG	Danny Graham (on loan from Sunderland)	18	7	18+0	7	0+0	0	0+0	0
35	FW	(Canada) CAN	Simeon Jackson	19	2	3+14	2	1+1	0	0+0	0
Players out on loan:
18	MF	(Republic of Ireland) IRL	John O'Sullivan (on loan at Bury)	3	0	0+2	0	0+0	0	1+0	0
19	MF	(England) ENG	Chris Taylor (on loan at Millwall)	15	0	6+6	0	2+1	0	0+0	0
Players that played for Blackburn Rovers this season that have left the club:
31	FW	(The Gambia) GAM	Modou Barrow (on loan from Swansea City)	5	0	1+3	0	0+0	0	0+1	0
15	DF	(Canada) CAN	Doneil Henry (on loan from West Ham United)	1	0	0+1	0	0+0	0	0+0	0
14	DF	(Sweden) SWE	Marcus Olsson	20	0	19+1	0	0+0	0	0+0	0
8	FW	(France) FRA	Bengali-Fodé Koita	15	0	8+6	0	0+0	0	0+1	0
16	FW	(Wales) WAL	Tom Lawrence (on loan from Leicester City)	23	2	14+7	2	1+1	0	0+0	0
11	FW	(Scotland) SCO	Jordan Rhodes	26	11	25+0	10	0+1	1	0+0	0
8	FW	(Scotland) SCO	Tony Watt (on loan from Charlton Athletic)	11	2	6+3	1	1+1	1	0+0	0

=== Goalscorers ===
As of 8 May 2016

Rank	No.	Pos.	Name	League	FA Cup	League Cup	Total
1	11	FW	(Scotland) Jordan Rhodes*	10	1	0	11
2	12	FW	(England) Danny Graham	7	0	0	7
3	10	MF	(England) Ben Marshall	2	4	0	6
4	22	DF	(Republic of Ireland) Shane Duffy	4	0	0	4
5	21	MF	(Nigeria) Hope Akpan	3	0	0	3
=	14	MF	(Spain) Jordi Gómez	3	0	0	3
=	32	MF	(Scotland) Craig Conway	3	0	0	3
8	16	FW	(Wales) Tom Lawrence*	2	0	0	2
=	5	DF	(Scotland) Grant Hanley	2	0	0	2
=	7	FW	(England) Nathan Delfouneso	1	0	1	2
=	8	FW	(Scotland) Tony Watt*	1	1	0	2
=	31	MF	(England) Elliott Bennett	2	0	0	2
=	35	FW	(Canada) Simeon Jackson	2	0	0	2
14	29	MF	(Northern Ireland) Corry Evans	1	0	0	1
=	15	DF	(England) Elliott Ward	1	0	0	1
—	—	—	Own Goal	2	0	0	2
Total				46	6	1	53

- * left the club

=== Assists ===
As of 8 May 2016

Rank	No.	Pos.	Name	League	FA Cup	League Cup	Total
1	32	MF	(Scotland) Craig Conway	5	0	0	5
2	16	FW	(Wales) Tom Lawrence*	2	1	0	3
3	8	FW	(France) Bengali-Fodé Koita*	2	0	0	2
=	2	DF	(Wales) Adam Henley	2	0	0	2
=	31	MF	(England) Elliott Bennett	2	0	0	2
=	22	DF	(Republic of Ireland) Shane Duffy	2	0	0	2
=	26	MF	(Republic of Ireland) Darragh Lenihan	2	0	0	2
=	16	MF	(England) Matt Grimes	2	0	0	2
=	5	DF	(Scotland) Grant Hanley	2	0	0	2
=	4	DF	(England) Matthew Kilgallon	2	0	0	2
11	24	DF	(Namibia) Ryan Nyambe	0	0	1	1
=	35	FW	(Canada) Simeon Jackson	1	0	0	1
=	30	GK	(England) Jason Steele	1	0	0	1
=	8	FW	(Scotland) Tony Watt*	1	0	0	1
=	14	MF	(Spain) Jordi Gómez	1	0	0	1
=	6	MF	(England) Jason Lowe	1	0	0	1
—	—	—	No assist	18	5	0	23
Total				46	6	1	53

- * left the club

=== Disciplinary record ===
As of 8 May 2016

No.	Pos.	Name	Championship			FA Cup			League Cup			Total		
No.	Pos.	Name	Yellow card	(yellow card) (red card)	Red card	Yellow card	(yellow card) (red card)	Red card	Yellow card	(yellow card) (red card)	Red card	Yellow card	(yellow card) (red card)	Red card
2	DF	(Wales) Adam Henley	4	0	1	0	0	0	0	0	0	4	0	1
3	DF	(England) Tommy Spurr	2	0	0	1	0	0	1	0	0	4	0	0
4	DF	(England) Matthew Kilgallon	1	0	0	0	0	0	0	0	0	1	0	0
5	DF	(Scotland) Grant Hanley	8	1	0	0	0	0	0	0	0	8	1	0
8	FW	(France) Bengali-Fodé Koita*	3	0	0	0	0	0	0	0	0	3	0	0
10	MF	(England) Ben Marshall	4	0	0	0	0	0	0	0	0	4	0	0
11	FW	(Scotland) Jordan Rhodes	1	0	0	0	0	0	0	0	0	1	0	0
14	MF	(Sweden) Marcus Olsson*	4	0	0	0	0	0	0	0	0	4	0	0
22	DF	(Republic of Ireland) Shane Duffy	10	0	1	0	0	0	0	0	0	10	0	1
23	MF	(England) Danny Guthrie	4	0	0	0	0	0	0	0	0	4	0	0
29	MF	(Northern Ireland) Corry Evans	11	0	0	0	0	0	0	0	0	11	0	0
30	GK	(England) Jason Steele	1	0	0	0	0	0	0	0	0	1	0	0
21	MF	(Nigeria) Hope Akpan	7	0	0	0	0	0	0	0	0	7	0	0
16	FW	(Wales) Tom Lawrence*	2	0	0	1	0	0	0	0	0	3	0	0
19	MF	(England) Chris Taylor	1	0	0	1	1	0	0	0	0	1	1	0
32	MF	(Scotland) Craig Conway	1	0	1	1	0	0	0	0	0	2	0	1
9	FW	(England) Chris Brown	1	0	0	0	0	1	0	0	0	1	0	1
26	MF	(Republic of Ireland) Darragh Lenihan	9	0	0	2	0	0	0	0	0	11	0	0
35	FW	(Canada) Simeon Jackson	1	0	0	1	0	0	0	0	0	2	0	0
14	MF	(Spain) Jordi Gómez	3	0	0	0	0	0	0	0	0	3	0	0
12	FW	(England) Danny Graham	4	0	0	0	0	0	0	0	0	4	0	0
31	MF	(England) Elliott Bennett	5	0	0	0	0	0	0	0	0	5	0	0
8	FW	(Scotland) Tony Watt *	2	0	0	0	0	0	0	0	0	2	0	0
15	MF	(England) Elliott Ward	1	0	0	0	0	0	0	0	0	1	0	0
16	MF	(England) Matt Grimes	1	0	0	0	0	0	0	0	0	1	0	0
Total			88	1	3	8	1	1	1	0	0	97	2	4

- * left the club

== Transfers ==
=== Transfers in ===
Date from	Position	Nationality	Name	From	Fee	Ref.
21 July 2015	DM	FRA	Sacha Petshi	Bastia	Free transfer	
21 July 2015	RW	FRA	Bengali-Fodé Koita	Caen	Free transfer	
5 August 2015	CM	ENG	Danny Guthrie	Reading	Free transfer	
6 August 2015	CF	ENG	Nathan Delfouneso	Blackpool	Free transfer	
11 August 2015	CM	NGA	Hope Akpan	Reading	Free transfer	
5 January 2016	MF	JAM	Elliott Bennett	Norwich City	Undisclosed (nominal fee)	
15 January 2016	FW	CAN	Simeon Jackson	Barnsley	Free transfer	
20 January 2016	DF	ENG	Elliott Ward	AFC Bournemouth	Free transfer	

=== Loans in ===
Date from	Position	Nationality	Name	From	Length	Ref.
10 August 2015	CF	GAM	Modou Barrow	Swansea City	Three-month loan (terminated by Swansea City 08/09/2015)	(Note: On 8 September 2015, Barrow was recalled by his parent club Swansea City.)
21 August 2015	CF	WAL	Tom Lawrence	Leicester City	Four-month loan (3 January) (Extended 31 January)	
24 November 2015	DF	CAN	Doneil Henry	West Ham United	One-month loan (3 January)	
20 January 2016	FW	ENG	Danny Graham	Sunderland	End of season	
29 January 2016	FW	SCO	Tony Watt	Charlton Athletic	End of season (fee agreed)(Returned to Charlton due to injury)	
1 February 2016	MF	ESP	Jordi Gómez	Sunderland	End of season	
13 February 2016	MF	ENG	Matt Grimes	Swansea City	Three-month loan (16 May)	

=== Transfers out ===
Date from	Position	Nationality	Name	To	Fee	Ref.
26 June 2015	CM	SCO	Tom Cairney	Fulham	£3,000,000 (£3,500,000+ with add-ons)	
1 July 2015	LB	ENG	Ben Marsh	Free agent	Released	
1 July 2015	CB	ENG	Kellen Daly	Free agent	Released	
1 July 2015	AM	ENG	David Dunn	Oldham Athletic (Note: Following Dunn's release he joined Oldham Athletic.)	Released	
1 July 2015	CM	ESP	Adrián Edo	Free agent	Released	
1 July 2015	CB	WAL	Sam Jones	Free agent	Released	
1 July 2015	CM	POR	Paulo Jorge	Free agent	Released	
1 July 2015	LW	NOR	Joshua King	AFC Bournemouth	Bosman: £1,500,000 (£2,000,000 with add-ons)	
1 July 2015	LM	ENG	Josh Morris	Bradford City	Free transfer	
1 July 2015	DM	ENG	George Pierce	Free agent	Released	
1 July 2015	GK	ENG	Paul Robinson	Burnley (Note: Following Robinson's release he later joined Burnley.)	Released	
1 July 2015	RB	ENG	James Rae	Barnsley (Note: Following Scott's release he joined Barnsley's U21 squad.)	Released	
1 July 2015	CB	CMR	Yann Songo'o	Plymouth Argyle	Released	
1 July 2015	CF	ENG	Luke Varney	Ipswich Town (Note: Following Varney's release he later joined Ipswich Town.)	Released	
1 July 2015	GK	ENG	Callum Williams	Altrincham	Released	
8 July 2015	CF	IRL	Leon Best	Rotherham United (Note: Following Best's release he later joined Rotherham United.)	Mutual consent	
31 July 2015	GK	ENG	Jake Kean	Norwich City (Note: Following Kean's release he joined Norwich City.)	Mutual consent	
31 July 2015	CF	BEN	Rudy Gestede	Aston Villa	£6,000,000	
6 January 2016	MF	IRE	Mark Edgar	Coleraine	Free transfer	
26 January 2016	LB	SWE	Marcus Olsson	Derby County	£750,000 (£1,000,000 with add-ons)	
27 January 2016	FW	FRA	Bengali-Fodé Koita	Kasımpaşa	£240,000	
1 February 2016	FW	SCO	Jordan Rhodes	Middlesbrough	Undisclosed (~£9,000,000 + potential add-ons worth ~£2–4million)	
1 February 2016	MF	FRA	Sacha Petshi	Créteil	Free transfer	

- Includes estimated 15% sell on fee (£450,000-£600,000) following Steven Nzonzi transfer from Stoke City to Sevilla 9 July 2015 and potential add-ons from the Tom Cairney sale.
- Sell-on clauses have been negotiated in the sales of Josh Morris and Tom Cairney.

=== Loans out ===
Date from	Position	Nationality	Name	To	Length	Ref.
21 August 2015	CF	SCO	Jordan Preston	Ayr United	Six-month loan (16 January) (Extended (9 June))	
4 September 2015	FW	ENG	Callum Hendry	Clitheroe	Work experience (Extended (2 November))	
4 September 2015	DF	WAL	Ben Williams	Morecambe	Work Experience	
18 September 2015	FW	ENG	Sam Joel	Bamber Bridge	One-month loan (17 October) (Extended)	
23 September 2015	MF	ENG	Lewis Hardcastle	Salford City	One-month loan (24 October) (Extended (28 November)) (Extended (24 December))	
16 October 2015	FW	ENG	Modou Cham	Stockport County	One-month loan (14 November) (Extended)	
7 November 2015	FW	ENG	Dean Rittenberg	Chorley	One-month loan (5 December)	
21 November 2015	FW	ENG	Luke Wall	Skelmersdale United	One-month loan (19 December)	
26 November 2015	MF	IRE	John O'Sullivan	Rochdale	One-month loan (3 January)	
26 November 2015	FW	ENG	Anton Forrester	Morecambe	One-month loan (3 January)	
15 January 2016	MF	IRE	John O'Sullivan	Bury	One-month loan (13 February) (Extended till end of season)	
4 March 2016	FW	ENG	Modou Cham	Hednesford Town	One-month loan (2 April) (Extended 30 April)	
17 March 2016	MF	ENG	Chris Taylor	Millwall	End of season	
18 March 2016	FW	ENG	Nathan Delfouneso	Bury	One-month loan (19 April)	
