= Darragh Lenihan =

Irish footballer (born 1994)

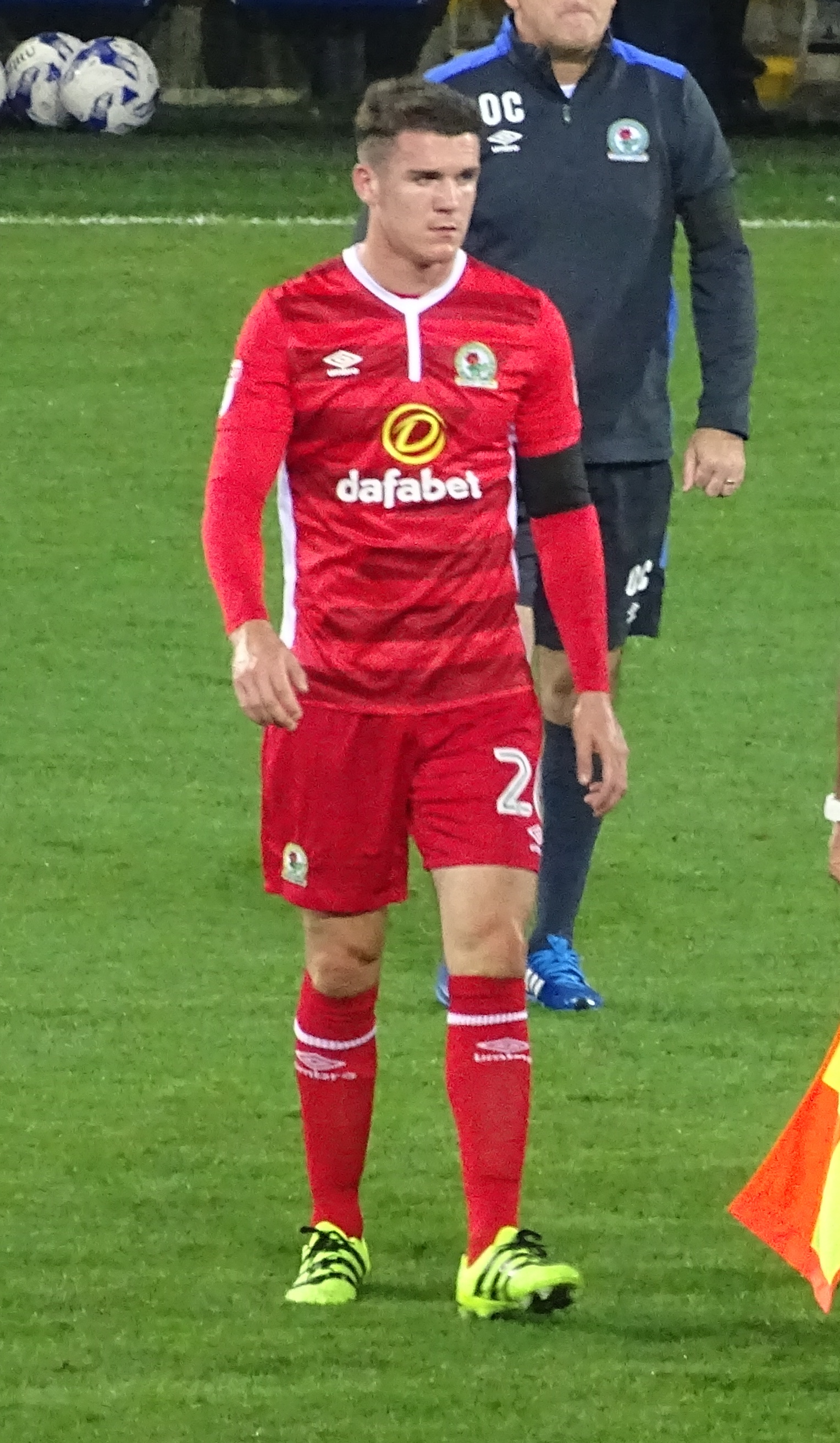
- Lenihan playing for Blackburn Rovers in 2016

Personal information
- Full name: Darragh Patrick Lenihan
- Date of birth: 16 March 1994 (age 32)
- Place of birth: Dunboyne, Ireland
- Height: 1.87 m (6 ft 2 in)
- Position: Defender

Youth career
- 1998–2004: Dunboyne A.F.C.
- 2004–2011: Belvedere
- 2011–2012: Blackburn Rovers

Senior career*
Years	Team	Apps	(Gls)
2012–2022	Blackburn Rovers	233	(9)
2014–2015	→ Burton Albion (loan)	17	(1)
2022–2026	Middlesbrough	51	(1)

International career^{‡}
2010–2011	Republic of Ireland U17	2	(0)
2012–2013	Republic of Ireland U19	1	(0)
2014–2016	Republic of Ireland U21	15	(0)
2018–2023	Republic of Ireland	4	(0)
- * Club domestic league appearances and goals as of 03:42, 28 February 2024 (UTC) ‡ National team caps and goals as of 22:01, 16 June 2023 (UTC)

Darragh Patrick Lenihan (born 16 March 1994) is an Irish professional footballer who plays as a defender. He last played for EFL Championship club Middlesbrough.

== Club career ==
=== Blackburn Rovers ===
Born in Dunboyne, Ireland, Lenihan started playing football when he joined his local team Dunboyne A.F.C. at four years old. At the age of 10, Lenihan joined his older brothers at Belvedere. While progressing through Belvedere's youth team, he was scouted by Middlesbrough and Derby County, who offered him a contract. However, Lenihan rejected the move, stating that it wasn't a right move for him at the time. When he was sixteen years old, Lenihan signed for Blackburn Rovers in the summer of 2011. On 20 April 2012, Lenihan played the first leg in the final of the FA Youth Cup, as the academy loss 4–0 against Chelsea Youth. However, his first two years at the club were "blighted by a series of serious injuries". While progressing at the academy, both coach Eric Kinder and Colin Hendry persuaded him to switch from playing in the central midfield position to centre–back position, a position he plays today.

A year later on 1 July 2013, Lenihan signed a one-year contract with the club. In the second–half of the 2013–14 season, he appeared twice as an unused substitute in Blackburn Rovers' first team. On 1 July 2014, Lenihan signed a one-year contract extension with the club for the second time.

=== Loan to Burton Albion ===
On 21 October 2014, Lenihan signed for Burton Albion on a month's loan deal. He made his league debut on 25 October 2014, coming off the bench against Stevenage, as the Brewers loss 1–0.

On 24 November 2014, Lenihan's loan spell with Burton Albion was extended until 3 January 2015. His loan spell with Burton Albion was extended twice for another month on 5 January 2015 and on 9 February 2015.

He scored his first goal for the club in a 1–1 draw with Portsmouth on 17 January 2015. After five months at Burton Albion, Lenihan was recalled by Blackburn on 4 March 2015. By the time he left the Brewers, Lenihan made seventeen appearances and scoring once in all competitions. Lenihan described his time at the Brewers, calling it "the best thing that he has done". Burton Albion's promotion to League One earned him a medal.

=== First team breakthrough at Blackburn Rovers ===
Shortly after being recalled, Lenihan had to wait until on 25 April 2015 to make his debut for Blackburn Rovers against Millwall coming off the bench in the first half to replace Matthew Kilgallon, winning 2–0. After making his debut, he said in his post-match interview that it was a great experience playing at Ewood Park and that hard work and patience had helped to earn him a first team place. In a follow–up match against Huddersfield Town, Lenihan made his full debut for the side, in a 2–2 draw. At the end of the 2014–15 season, he made three appearances in all competitions. Following this, Lenihan signed a one-year contract extension with Blackburn Rovers for the third time.

Ahead of the 2015–16 season, manager Gary Bowyer said he planned on putting Lenihan in the first team, describing him as a "valuable member of the squad". He made his first appearance of the season, starting a match, in a 2–1 loss against Shrewsbury Town in the first round of the League Cup. However, Lenihan found himself out of the starting line–up, due to the partnership of Grant Hanley and Shane Duffy. He also sustained a back injury during Blackburn Rovers' pre–season tour and had been a recurring problem in the first half of the season. Following the sacking of Bowyer and the appointment of Paul Lambert, he stated that Lenihan would not be loaned out and plan on using him in the first team. This proved to be true when he began playing in the defensive midfield position. Despite starting once in the centre–back position, manager Lambert preferred Lenihan play in the defensive midfield position when he opted to sign Elliott Ward instead. In a match against Middlesbrough on 6 February 2016, he set up the opening goal of the game, in a 1–1 draw. After the match, both manager Lambert and the local newspaper Lancashire Telegraph praised his performance. On 26 February 2016, Lenihan signed a contract extension with the club, keeping him until 2019. In a match against Brentford on 19 March 2016, his performance was praised, once again, by Lancashire Evening Telegraph, due to "covering every blade of grass and made more tackles and interceptions than any other player." At the end of the 2015–16 season, Lenihan made twenty–seven appearances in all competitions. For his performance, he was nominated for the MBNA Northwest Football Awards.

Lenihan continued to play in the defensive midfield position for Blackburn Rovers' first five league matches of the 2016–17 season. However, he missed one match due to picking up five yellow cards. Lenihan made his return, coming on as a 75th-minute substitute, in a 2–1 loss against Leeds United on 13 September 2016. In a match against Birmingham City on 1 October 2016, he made a poor pass to the wing which led to the opposition team to score the only goal of the game. Due to the injury of Wes Brown and Gordon Greer, Lenihan began starting playing in the centre–back position and formed a partnership with Charlie Mulgrew and Tommie Hoban. His no-nonsense approach to defending in the centre–back position proved to effective, as his partnership with Mulgrew against Brentford and Newcastle United was praised by manager Owen Coyle. In a follow–up match, he made his 50th appearance for the club, in a 1–1 draw against Huddersfield Town and was named Man of the Match. However, Lenihan's partnership with Mulgrew was short–lived due to shortage of defenders, and at one point, saw both players play in left–back and right–back positions respectively. To make matters worse when on 20 December 2016, he received a straight red card for a foul on Sam Morsy, as Blackburn Rovers loss 2–0 against Barnsley. After the match, manager Coyle believed that Lenihan was not a "malicious player" but warned him "not to let his frustrations get the better of him". Following his return after a three match suspension, he returned to the starting line–up, reuniting his centre–back partnership with Mulgrew, against Ipswich Town, as the club loss 3–2 on 14 January 2017. However, Lenihan suffered a groin injury but he quickly made a full recovery, in a 2–1 loss against Sheffield Wednesday. Under the new management of Tony Mowbray, he resumed the partnership of Lenihan and Mulgrew in the centre–back position, as Blackburn Rovers' results improved through March. However, in a match against Reading on 4 April 2017, Lenihan suffered a groin injury and was substituted at half time, as the club loss 3–1. This saw him miss three matches. But on 22 April 2017, he made his return to the starting line–up for Blackburn Rovers and helped kept a clean sheet, in a 0–0 draw against Wolverhampton Wanderers. Despite an improvement in form that offered some hope of survival, Lenihan started the match, in a 3–1 win against Brentford, but other results went against them and they were relegated to League One. Despite Blackburn Rovers' relegation, he and Mulgrew were praised by manager Mowbray for their performance, describing the pair as "giving the club confidence that they have a solid base to build from". At the end of the 2016–17 season, he made forty–four appearances in all competitions.

Ahead of the 2017–18 season, Lenihan was linked with a move to Sheffield United had two bids rejected for him. Manager Mowbray said he was determined to keep the player, which he did. However, Lenihan fractured a foot injury during a 2–1 loss against Southend United in the opening game of the season. Following a scan, he was eventually out until February, which impacted most of his 2017–18 season. Since returning to training in December, Lenihan spent two months, making progress on recovering from his injury in order to maintain his fitness. He played two times for Blackburn Rovers' reserve team in order to maintain his fitness. On 13 February 2018, Lenihan made his first team return from injury, coming on as a 55th-minute substitute, in a 2–1 win against Portsmouth. Following his return from injury, he started in the next five matches, reforming a centre–back partnership with Mulgrew. However, his return was short–lived when Lenihan suffered a back injury and was substituted in the 30th minute, as the club won 2–0 against Bradford City on 29 March 2018. After missing two matches with a back injury, he made his return to the starting line–up, in a 1–0 win against Gillingham on 10 April 2018. Lenihan started the match against Doncaster Rovers on 24 April 2018 and kept a clean sheet, in a 1–0 away win, which saw the club secure an immediate return to the Championship. On the last game of the season, he scored his first goal for Blackburn Rovers, scoring an opener header, in a 2–1 win against Oxford United. At the end of the 2017–18 season, Lenihan made sixteen appearances and scoring once in all competitions.

On 3 July 2018, Lenihan signed a contract extension with Blackburn Rovers, keeping him until 2022. He stated the club is "better equipped this time" on their return to the Championship. In the opening game of the season, Lenihan started the match and helped Blackburn Rovers drew 2–2 against Ipswich Town. After the match, both the Lancashire Telegraph and Mowbray praised his performance. He then helped the club go on unbeaten start in the first month of the season, including keeping three clean sheets. Since the start of the season, Lenihan regained his first team place in a centre–back position, forming a partnership with Mulgrew for the third time. He then scored his first goal of the season, scoring from a header, which turned out to be a winning goal, in a 2–1 win against Leeds United on 20 October 2018 (he described this as his favourite goal for Blackburn Rovers). In a follow–up match against Swansea City, Lenihan suffered a hip injury and was substituted in the 11th minute, in a 3–1. After missing one match, he returned to the starting line–up against Queens Park Rangers on 3 November 2018 and helped the club kept a clean sheet, in a 1–0 win, which saw him named Man of the Match by the Lancashire Telegraph. However, his return was short–lived when Lenihan suffered another hip injury that saw him out for three matches. He made his return from injury, starting a match, in a 2–2 draw against Birmingham City on 15 December 2018. Lenihan scored his second goal of the season, in a 4–2 loss against Newcastle United in the FA Cup third round replay. He helped the club kept three consecutive clean sheets between 12 January 2019 and 26 January 2019. However, Lenihan suffered a knee injury that saw him out for a month. It wasn't until on 30 March 2019 when he made his return to the starting line–up, in a 2–1 loss against Aston Villa. Following his return from injury, Lenihan regained his first team place in a centre–back position with Derrick Williams for the remainder of the season. After the absence of Mulgrew and Elliott Bennett, he captained the club for the first time in his career and helped Blackburn Rovers kept a clean sheet under his leadership throughout the match, in a 2–0 win against Bolton Wanderers on 22 April 2019. After the match, local newspaper Lancashire Telegraph believed that Lenihan has the potential to be a captain on a "long-term" for the club. On the last game of the season, he scored his third goal of the season, in a 2–2 draw against Swansea City. At the end of the 2018–19 season, Lenihan made thirty–eight appearances and scoring three times in all competitions. For his performance, he awarded Peter Jackson the Jeweller Man of the Match award. Local newspaper Lancashire Telegraph praised Lenihan, describing him as the "importance to Blackburn Rovers" and showing his maturity that has the potential to be the future captain.

Lenihan appeared in the opening game of the 2019–20 season before missing out with knee injury. After missing two matches, he returned to the starting line–up against Middlesbrough on 17 August 2019 and helped Blackburn Rovers kept a clean sheet, in a 1–0 win. Lenihan followed up by keeping two clean sheets in the next two league matches. After his return from injury, he regained his first team place in a centre–back position, forming a partnership with Williams for the next two months following the departure of Mulgrew. Lenihan made his 150th appearance in his professional football career against Millwall on 14 September 2019 and set up the second goal of the game, in a 2–0 win. However, during a 4–2 loss against Queens Park Rangers on 5 October 2019, he was limped off with an injury and was substituted in the 67th minute. After a scan, it was revealed that Lenihan suffered a knee injury and was out for a month. It wasn't until on 23 November 2019 when he returned to the starting line–up, in a 3–2 win against Barnsley. Following this, Lenihan regained his first team place in a centre–back position, forming a partnership with Tosin Adarabioyo. He was also given the captaincy in the absence of Bennett and Williams for the next three months. Lenihan scored on his 150th appearance for Blackburn Rovers, in a 5–0 win against Sheffield Wednesday on 18 January 2020. In a follow–up match against Queens Park Rangers, he scored the second goal of the game from a header, in a 2–1 win. Two weeks later on 11 February 2020, Lenihan scored his third goal of the season, in a 3–0 win against Hull City. However, he missed two matches due to picking up ten yellow cards so far this season before the season was suspended because of the COVID-19 pandemic in March. During the suspension, Lenihan agreed to wage deferrals along with his teammates. With the competition later resuming behind closed doors, he started in the match against Bristol City on 20 June 2020 and set up the third goal of the game, in a 3–1 win. Following this, Lenihan continued to form a centre–back partnership with Tosin Adarabioyo, as well as, his captain duty. At the end of the 2019–20 season, he made thirty–nine appearances and scoring three times in all competitions.

At the start of the 2020-21 season, Lenihan regularly captained Blackburn Rovers following the absence of Bennett. However, he suffered a knee injury that kept him out for three weeks. On 17 October 2020, Lenihan returned to the starting line–up from injury as captain, in a 1–0 loss against Nottingham Forest. Following his return from injury, he continued to form a centre–back partnership with Williams until the latter suffered an injury and his eventually departure from the club. This lasted until Lenihan received a second bookable offence, in a 2–2 draw against Brentford on 5 December 2020. After serving a one match suspension, he returned to the starting line–up from injury as captain, in a 2–1 loss against Norwich City on 12 December 2020. Following the injury of Williams, Lenihan spent the remainder of the first half of the season, forming a centre–back partnership with Daniel Ayala, Scott Wharton and Bradley Johnson. In a match against Luton Town on 30 January 2021, he helped Blackburn Rovers kept a clean sheet, in a 1–0 win and was named Team of the Week by the English Football League. However, Lenihan then missed two matches due to a rib injury. On 27 February 2021, he returned to the starting line–up from injury as captain, in a 1–1 draw against Coventry City. Lenihan spent the second half of the season, forming a centre–back partnership with Jarrad Branthwaite and Taylor Harwood-Bellis. He then made his 200th league appearance for the club, in a 1–0 loss against Brentford on 12 March 2021. However, Lenihan suffered a groin injury that saw him out for one match. Despite this, he was able to return and start the remaining four more league matches. At the end of the 2020–21 season, Lenihan made forty–four appearances in all competitions.

Ahead of the 2021–22 season, Lenihan was officially given the captaincy by Blackburn Rovers following the departure of Elliott. He scored his first goal of the season, which turned out to be a winning goal, in a 2–1 win against Nottingham Forest on 18 August 2021. Lenihan's leadership as captain was praised by manager Mowbray, due to "showing leadership and keeping the group of player solidified". During a 2–2 draw against Luton Town on 11 September 2021, he made a heavy challenge tackle on Allan Campbell that saw him substituted and was given a yellow card as a result. After the match, the decision to give Lenihan a yellow card received criticism from Jobi McAnuff and the opposition team manager Nathan Jones, while manager Mowbray defended the player. Campbell later stated that he hadn't received an apology from Lenihan. However, during a 5–1 win against Cardiff City on 25 September 2021, he suffered a groin injury and was substituted in the 56th minute. After missing two matches, Lenihan returned to the starting line–up from injury as captain, in a 2–2 draw against Coventry City on 16 October 2021. Following his return from injury, he was included two consecutive times in the Team of the Week by the English Football League between 23 October 2021 and 31 October 2021. In the first four months to the season, Lenihan formed a centre–back partnership with Ayala. After Ayala suffered an injury, he formed another centre–back partnership with Wharton and Jan Paul van Hecke. Lenihan scored his second goal of the season from a header, in a 4–0 win against Peterborough United on 24 November 2021. Together with Wharton and van Hecke, they helped the club kept five more clean sheets in a next five matches between 24 November 2021 and 18 December 2021. During the club's progress of keeping a clean sheet, he was named the Team of the Week by the English Football League three times out of the five matches. His performance throughout January also earned him a place for EFL Championship's Team of the Month. In a match against Nottingham Forest on 9 February 2022, Lenihan received a red card for a second bookable offence, in a 2–0 loss. After serving a one match suspension, he returned to the starting line–up from injury as captain, in a 1–0 loss against Sheffield United on 23 February 2022. By March, Lenihan began to play in a right–back position by manager Mowbray. However, he suffered a groin injury while on his international duty and was out for two weeks. On 9 April 2022, Lenihan returned to the starting line–up from injury as captain, in a 1–1 draw against Blackpool. A week later on 18 April 2022, he made his 250th appearance for Blackburn Rovers, in a 1–0 loss against Stoke City. In a follow–up match, Lenihan scored his third goal of the season from a header, in a 4–1 win against Preston North End. After the match, he was named the Team of the Week by the English Football League. At the end of the 2021–22 season, Lenihan made forty–three appearances and scoring three times in all competitions.

During the 2021–22 season, Blackburn Rovers began open talks with Lenihan over a new contract. By March, however, it was revealed that he has yet to sign a contract extension with the club. On 17 June 2022, Lenihan was confirmed to be leaving the club at the end of his contract on 30 June.

=== Middlesbrough ===
On 24 June 2022, Lenihan agreed to join Middlesbrough on a four-year contract upon the expiration of his Blackburn Rovers contract. Upon joining the club, he was given the number twenty–six shirt.

He made his debut for Middlesbrough, starting the match, in a 1–1 draw against West Bromwich in the opening game of the season. In a follow–up match against Queens Park Rangers, Lenihan received a red card in the last minute of the game for a foul on Macauley Bonne, as the club lost 3–2. After serving a one–match suspension, he returned to the starting line–up against Sheffield United on 14 August 2022 and set up an equalising goal for Chuba Akpom in a 2–2 draw. However, during a 2–1 loss against Watford on 30 August 2022, Lenihan suffered an ankle injury and was substituted in the 56th minute. As a result, he was out for a month. On 5 October 2022, Lenihan returned from injury, coming on as a 70th-minute substitute in a 1–0 win against Birmingham City. After returning from injury, he became a first team regular, forming a centre–back partnership with Dael Fry. His performances earned praise from manager Michael Carrick, who said: "Lenihan has been terrific for us. He's a big voice in the changing room and a big voice in terms of leading the back line. He and Dael have created a good partnership and understanding together. Lenihan has been a huge positive and big part of what we've done so far." However, in early January he suffered a foot injury that saw him out for two matches. On 22 January 2023 Lenihan returned from injury, starting the match in a 2–0 loss against Sunderland. Following his return from injury, he regained his first team place for the rest of the season, continuing to form a centre–back partnership with McNair and Fry. On 18 February 2023, Lenihan captained Middlesbrough for the first time, in a 3–1 win against Sheffield United. He then captained the club in three separate matches against Coventry City, including both legs of the Championship play–offs. Lenihan made forty–three appearances in all competitions during the 2022–23 season.

The first two matches of the 2023–24 season saw Lenihan as Middlesbrough captain; the club lost both matches before the return of Jonny Howson. He scored his first goal for the club on 19 September 2023, in a 1–1 draw with Sheffield Wednesday. However, Lenihan was plagued with injuries that eventually saw him out for the rest of the 2023–24 season. During the 2023–24 season he made ten appearances in all competitions, scoring once.

In Middlesbrough's pre–season tour before the 2024–25 season, Lenihan made his return to training after a ten-month absence. He appeared in a friendly match against Gateshead on 24 July 2024 and scored the only goal of the game. However, Lenihan's return was short–lived as he was injured once again.

On 28 May 2026, Middlesbrough announced it was releasing the player.

== International career ==
=== Youth career ===
In September 2010, Lenihan was called up to the Republic of Ireland U17 for the first time. He made his under-17 side debut, starting a match, in a 3–1 win against Malta U17 on 25 September 2010. Lenihan played in the central-midfield position, in a follow–up match, in a 2–0 win against Albania U17. Lenihan went on to make five appearances for the Republic of Ireland U17.

In September 2012, Lenihan was called up by Republic of Ireland U19 in September 2012. He made his only under-19 appearance for Republic of Ireland, in a 1–1 draw against Latvia U19 on 8 September 2012.

Lenihan was called up by Republic of Ireland U21 for the first time in May 2014. He captained the under-21 side on his debut and led the whole game, in a 1–1 draw against Qatar U23. He later captained Republic of Ireland U21 five more times in 2015. Lenihan then captained two more times for the under-21 side in early–2016. He went on to make fifteen appearances for Republic of Ireland U21.

=== Senior career ===
His return from injury at Blackburn Rovers earned Lenihan a call-up to the Republic of Ireland for the first time in March 2018. However, he appeared as an unused substitute, in a 1–0 loss against Turkey on 23 March 2018. On 2 June 2018, Lenihan made his debut for the Ireland senior team in a 2–1 win over the USA in Dublin, he was credited with the assist for Ireland's opening goal scored by Graham Burke after a Lenihan volley which was on target. Lenihan became the first person from County Meath to represent the Republic of Ireland at senior level.

Lenihan made his competitive debut for Ireland nearly four years after his last cap, starting in a 1–1 UEFA Nations League draw against Ukraine.

== Personal life ==
During his early career at Blackburn Rovers, Lenihan shared houses with his former teammate, John O'Sullivan. Growing up, he was a Manchester United supporter and idolised Roy Keane. Lenihan said he watches documentaries, Formula 1 and the big boxing fights in his spare time.

During his time at Blackburn Rovers, he partake in charity work and local communities. In June 2023, Lenihan earned class honours in sports science at Manchester Metropolitan University.

Lenihan is married to his wife, Shauna, and together they have two children.

== Career statistics ==
As of match played 9 December 2023

Appearances and goals by club, season and competition
Club	Season	League			FA Cup		League Cup		Other		Total	
Club	Season	Division	Apps	Goals	Apps	Goals	Apps	Goals	Apps	Goals	Apps	Goals
Blackburn Rovers	2013–14	Championship	0	0	0	0	0	0	—		0	0
Blackburn Rovers	2014–15	Championship	3	0	0	0	0	0	—		3	0
Blackburn Rovers	2015–16	Championship	23	0	3	0	1	0	—		27	0
Blackburn Rovers	2016–17	Championship	40	0	2	0	2	0	—		44	0
Blackburn Rovers	2017–18	League One	14	1	0	0	0	0	0	0	14	1
Blackburn Rovers	2018–19	Championship	34	2	2	1	2	0	—		38	3
Blackburn Rovers	2019–20	Championship	37	3	1	0	1	0	—		39	3
Blackburn Rovers	2020–21	Championship	41	0	1	0	2	0	—		44	0
Blackburn Rovers	2021–22	Championship	41	3	1	0	1	0	—		43	3
Blackburn Rovers	Total		233	9	10	1	9	0	0	0	252	10
Burton Albion (loan)	2014–15	League Two	17	1	0	0	0	0	0	0	17	1
Middlesbrough	2022–23	Championship	41	0	0	0	0	0	2 (Note: Appearance in Championship play-offs)	0	43	0
Middlesbrough	2023–24	Championship	8	1	0	0	2	0	—		10	1
Middlesbrough	Total		49	1	0	0	2	0	2	0	53	1
Career total			299	11	10	1	11	0	2	0	322	12

=== International ===
As of match played 16 June 2022

Appearances and goals by national team and year
National team	Year	Apps	Goals
Republic of Ireland	2018	2	0
Republic of Ireland	2022	1	0
Republic of Ireland	2023	1	0
Total		4	0

== Honours ==
Burton Albion

- Football League Two: 2014–15

Blackburn Rovers

- EFL League One runner-up: 2017–18
