= Adam Henley =

Footballer (born 1994)

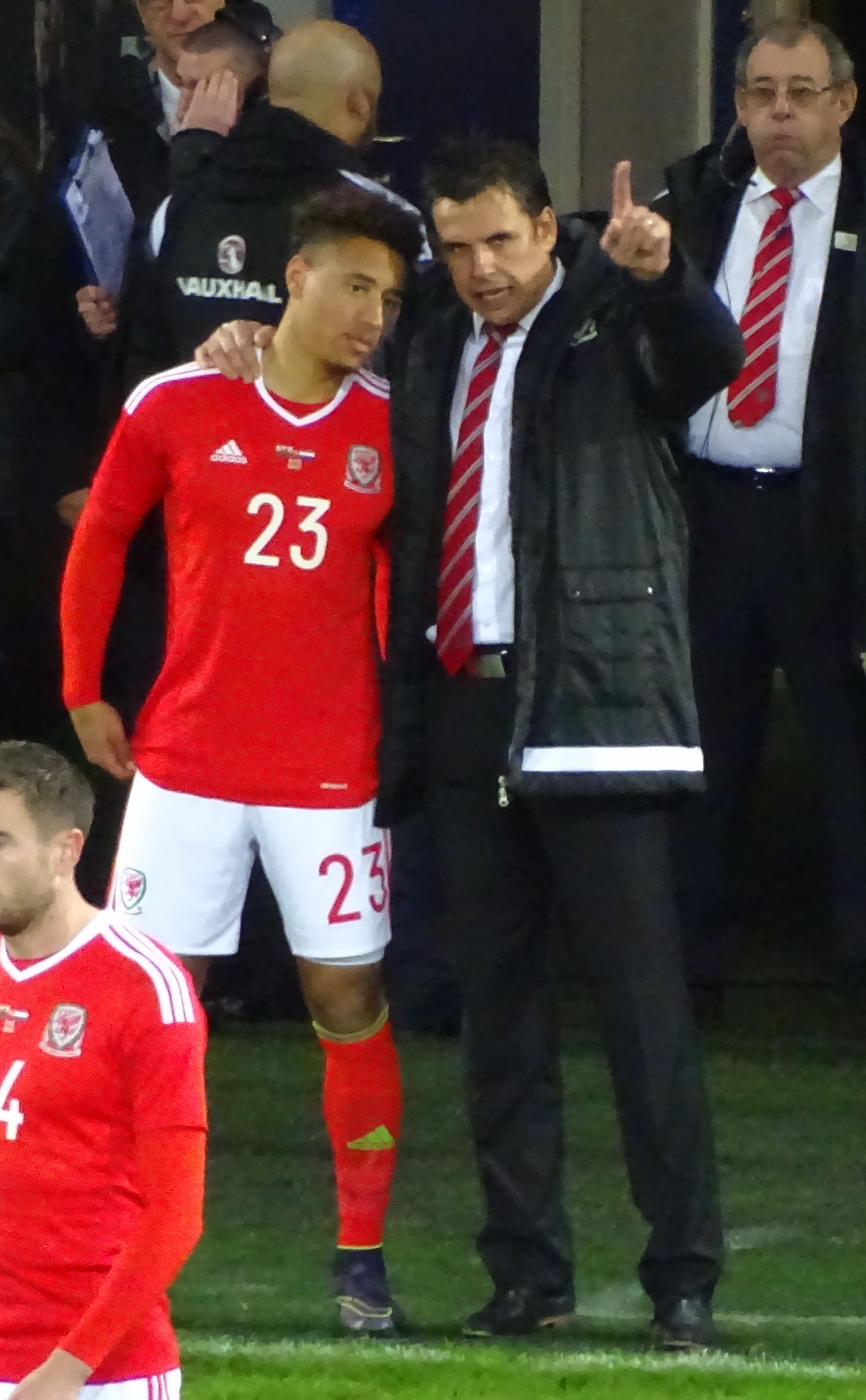
- Henley (left) with manager Chris Coleman in 2015

Personal information
- Full name: Adam David Henley
- Date of birth: 14 June 1994 (age 32)
- Place of birth: Knoxville, Tennessee, United States
- Height: 5 ft 10 in (1.78 m)
- Position: Defender

Team information
- Current team: Chorley
- Number: 2

Youth career
- 2001–2011: Blackburn Rovers

Senior career*
| Years | Team | Apps | (Gls) |
| 2011–2017 | Blackburn Rovers | 80 | (1) |
| 2018–2019 | Real Salt Lake | 5 | (0) |
| 2018–2019 | → Real Monarchs (loan) | 8 | (0) |
| 2019–2020 | Bradford City | 24 | (0) |
| 2020– | Chorley | 181 | (5) |

International career
| 2010 | Wales U19 | 10 | (0) |
| 2012 | Wales U21 | 3 | (0) |
| 2015–2016 | Wales | 2 | (0) |
- * Club domestic league appearances and goals as of 16:40, 26 April 2026 (UTC)

Adam David Henley (born 14 June 1994) is a professional footballer who plays as a defender for National League North club Chorley. He primarily operates as a right-back, but can also be deployed at left-back.

Born in the United States and raised in England, Henley represented Wales at international level, making two appearances for the Wales senior national team.

== Club career ==
=== Early life ===
Henley was born in Knoxville, Tennessee to a Welsh mother and an American father and moved with his family to Chorley in England when he was two years old and grew up there. He attended Clayton-le-Woods Church of England Primary School, and St Michael's High School.

Before joining the Blackburn Rovers Academy, Henley spent some time in the youth system of Manchester United. He was also at Chorley Harriers' juniors. During his progress to the Blackburn Rovers Academy, he was coached by Manager Gary Bowyer from the U12 side to the U18 side.

=== Blackburn Rovers ===
A speedy full back who can play either on the right or the left, Henley quickly progressed from the Blackburn Rovers Academy to become a regular member of the reserve squad.

Henley made his first appearance for the senior squad on 16 July 2011, coming on as a late substitute in their pre-season match against Accrington Stanley. He was also a part of the first team squad that traveled to Hong Kong to play in the 2011 Premier League Asia Trophy. Ahead of the 2011–12 season, he was given a number 39 shirt.

In the 2011–12 season, on 19 November 2011, Henley made his professional – and Premier League – debut, replacing Míchel Salgado and playing the entire second half in a 3–3 draw against Wigan Athletic at the DW Stadium. On 26 December 2011, Henley earned his first start and played the full 90 minutes against Liverpool at Anfield, which finished in a 1–1 draw. Four days later, Henley signed a new two-and-a-half-year deal, his first professional contract at Blackburn Rovers. He was involved in one of the most remarkable results of the 2011–12 season on 31 December 2011, playing the full 90 minutes at left back in a 3–2 victory over Manchester United at Old Trafford. Henley helped set up the corner that Blackburn got their winner off as they beat Manchester United for the first time since 2005 at Old Trafford. Henley later made two appearances for the rest of the 2011–12 season, both were starts against Queens Park Rangers and Chelsea. However, he made seven appearances for the side, as they were relegated from the Premier League after losing 1–0 to Wigan Athletic. Despite this, he was awarded the club's Young Player of the Year.

At the start of the 2012–13 season, Henley's first team opportunities became more limited under manager Steve Kean, as Bradley Orr took his position in the right back; and was sent to the reserve side instead. Kean left the club and was replaced by former player Henning Berg. Under Berg, Henley received playing opportunities in the right back position. He made his first appearance of the 2012–13 season, starting the whole game, in a 2–0 loss against Crystal Palace on 3 November 2012. Henley soon received a run of first team appearance lead to Henley signing a new deal on 7 December 2012, keeping him until 2017. Shortly after signing a new contract, Henley revealed he was close to leaving Blackburn Rovers on loan before his first-team return. However, shortly after Berg's sacking, he found himself in the sidelined after suffering a hamstring injury and was sidelined for four to six weeks following a scan. On 26 February 2013, he returned from injury, coming on as a second–half substitute in a 3–0 defeat against Leicester City. After appearing the next two matches for the side, however, he suffered another hamstring injury and was sidelined for the rest of the season. Despite the injury, he went on to make 17 appearances in all competitions at the end of the 2012–13 season.

Ahead of the 2013–14 season, Henley returned to training following his recovery from a hamstring injury. However, he was sent to the reserve squad instead at the start of the season. Henley also faced a new competition from Todd Kane over the right–back position. After appearing as unused substitute in number of matches, he made his first appearance of the season, starting the whole game, in a 0–0 draw against Queens Park Rangers on 7 December 2013. Following this, Henley received a handful of first team appearances and took his position in the right back from Kane. He remained in the starting eleven until he suffered ankle injury and was sidelined for the rest of the season. Despite suffering ankle injury, Henley went on to make 22 appearances in all competitions.

Ahead of the 2014–15 season, Henley was publicity called out by Manager Bowyer to fight for his first team place in the right–back position. In response, Henley said he's determined to fight for his first team place for the new season. At the start of the 2014–15 season, he continued to rehabilitate from ankle injury and didn't return until August. On 12 August 2014 he returned from injury, starting in a 1–0 defeat to Scunthorpe United in the first round of the League Cup. Since returning from injury, Henley played out in either the right–back position and left–back position, though he was in competition with Alex Baptiste (and Ben Marshall) and Marcus Olsson respectively. Although Henley's impressive display during the side for three matches in October, Henley remained himself behind a pecking order in the first team later on. In addition facing his own injury concern, Henley continued to found himself out of the first team between late–December and mid–February. During those months, Henley was featured in three matches, all of them were FA Cup against Charlton Athletic, Swansea City and Stoke City. On 17 February 2015 he played his first league match for two months: a 1–1 draw against Cardiff City. Henley scored his first goal for Blackburn in a 2–1 win at Sheffield Wednesday on 4 March 2015. After this, Henley regained his first team place at Blackburn Rovers for the rest of the season, playing in the right–back position. At the end of the 2014–15 season, he went on to make a total of 24 appearances and scoring once in all competitions.

Ahead of the 2015–16 season, Henley found himself competing the right–back position with Ryan Nyambe. He started the whole game in the right–back position, in a 2–1 loss against Wolverhampton Wanderers in the opening game of the season. He briefly appeared the first three matches of the season before briefly missing out one game, due to fitness concern. Henley returned to the first team after missing out one game, starting the whole game, in a 0–0 draw against Bolton Wanderers on 28 August 2015. Even returning, he continued to regain his first team place in the right–back position. His 50th league appearance for the side came on 13 September 2015, which saw Blackburn Rovers lose 2–1 to Fulham, which he described it as "a good milestone for him personally". However, in a 3–0 defeat to Milton Keynes Dons on 17 October 2015, Henley was sent–off in an early first half after he "was adjudged to have brought down Josh Murphy in the box for a penalty". As a result, Henley served a one match suspension. Under new Manager Paul Lambert, Henley found himself, competing with loan signing, Doneil Henry. However, at the beginning of January, he soon lost his first team place to Marshall. For the rest of the 2015–16 season, Henley often be used in first team ins and out, leading him to appear as an unused substitute in number of matches. At the end of the season, he went on to make a total of 26 appearances in all competitions.

Ahead of the 2016–17 season, Henley said that his aim was to secure a long–term future at the club, describing it as a "massive year for him." Henley featured twice for the first three matches of the season, playing in the left–back position. But he suffered a hamstring injury during a 3–0 loss against Wigan Athletic on 14 August 2016 and was sidelined for a month. After returning from injury, Henley was assigned to the reserve side, which he did on two more occasions later on. Just shortly recovering from injury, he suffered another hamstring injury in early–December. At the end of the 2016–17 season, making three appearances in all competitions, Henley was released by the club upon expiry of his contract.

Upon learning his release, Henley made a farewell statement, saying that: "Blackburn will always have a special place in his heart."

=== Real Salt Lake ===
After his release by Blackburn Rovers, Henley was linked a move to clubs from England and USA. Despite the interests, he then went on a trial with Blackpool and Portsmouth. It was announced on 9 January 2018 that Henley signed with Major League Soccer club Real Salt Lake. Upon joining the club, Henley will join under the team's roster pending the receipt of his International Transfer Certificate.

After missing the first two matches of the season through injury, Henley made his Red Salt Lake debut, where he started and played 77 minutes before being substituted, in a 2–1 win over Vancouver Whitecaps on 8 April 2018. Prior to making his Real Salt Lake debut, he played for Real Monarchs, which saw them win 3–2 against Tulsa Roughnecks on 25 March 2018.

Henley and Salt Lake agreed to part ways in May 2019.

=== Bradford City ===
On 14 June 2019, Henley returned to English football, at the request of his former manager at Blackburn Rovers, Gary Bowyer, by signing a one-year contract with League Two club Bradford City.

On 26 May 2020 it was announced that he was one of 10 players who would leave Bradford City when their contract expired on 30 June 2020.

=== Chorley ===
On 20 November 2020, Henley signed for National League North club Chorley on a permanent basis.

== International career ==
Henley was qualified to play for Wales, England or the United States internationally. Henley was previously capped by Wales from the U19 level up to U21 level.

=== Senior career ===
In May 2012, Henley was called up to the senior squad for the first time against Mexico. However, he appeared as an unused substitute, as Mexico beat Wales 2–0.

After being named in the Wales squad, including for the UEFA Euro 2016 qualifying matches against Cyprus and Israel to be played on 3 and 6 September 2015, Henley finally made his debut on 13 November 2015 in a friendly against the Netherlands at Cardiff City Stadium, replacing Chris Gunter, in a 3–2 loss. His second appearance then came on 28 March 2016, where he came on as a substitute for Neil Taylor, in a 1–0 loss against Ukraine.

In May 2016, Henley was called up by the senior team for the 29-man training squad ahead of the UEFA Euro 2016. Because he suffered an injury in the squad training camp, Henley failed to make the final cut in Wales' 23-man squad for UEFA Euro 2016.

== Personal life ==
Despite previously having links at Manchester United's youth system, Henley grew up supporting rivals, Liverpool. Growing up, Henley described himself as a quite a steady child and a quite active child.

Despite living in England for the most of his life, Henley reflected about his family, quoting: "My biological father and his side of the family still live in Tennessee so this gives me a chance to spend more time with them which is great. I am also lucky to have dual citizenship." He revealed that he took a paper round job when he was 12, which he said it was an opportunity to make money for himself.

== Career statistics ==
=== Club ===
As of match played 4 May 2025

Appearances and goals by club, season and competition
| Club | Season | League | | | National cup (Note: Includes FA Cup, U.S. Open Cup) | | League cup (Note: Includes EFL Cup) | | Other | | Total | |
| Club | Season | Division | Apps | Goals | Apps | Goals | Apps | Goals | Apps | Goals | Apps | Goals |
|---|---|---|---|---|---|---|---|---|---|---|---|---|
| Blackburn Rovers | 2011–12 | Premier League | 7 | 0 | 1 | 0 | 0 | 0 | — | | 8 | 0 |
| Blackburn Rovers | 2012–13 | Championship | 15 | 0 | 2 | 0 | 0 | 0 | — | | 17 | 0 |
| Blackburn Rovers | 2013–14 | Championship | 14 | 0 | 2 | 0 | 0 | 0 | — | | 16 | 0 |
| Blackburn Rovers | 2014–15 | Championship | 18 | 1 | 5 | 0 | 1 | 0 | — | | 24 | 1 |
| Blackburn Rovers | 2015–16 | Championship | 24 | 0 | 2 | 0 | 0 | 0 | — | | 26 | 0 |
| Blackburn Rovers | 2016–17 | Championship | 2 | 0 | 0 | 0 | 1 | 0 | — | | 3 | 0 |
| Blackburn Rovers | Total | | 80 | 1 | 12 | 0 | 2 | 0 | — | | 94 | 1 |
| Real Salt Lake | 2018 | MLS | 5 | 0 | 1 | 0 | — | | 0 | 0 | 6 | 0 |
| Real Salt Lake | 2019 | MLS | 0 | 0 | 0 | 0 | — | | 0 | 0 | 0 | 0 |
| Real Salt Lake | Total | | 5 | 0 | 1 | 0 | — | | 0 | 0 | 6 | 0 |
| Real Monarchs | 2018 | United Soccer League | 8 | 0 | — | | — | | 0 | 0 | 8 | 0 |
| Real Monarchs | 2019 | USL Championship | 0 | 0 | — | | — | | 0 | 0 | 0 | 0 |
| Real Monarchs | Total | | 8 | 0 | — | | — | | 0 | 0 | 8 | 0 |
| Bradford City | 2019–20 | League Two | 24 | 0 | 2 | 0 | 0 | 0 | 1 (Note: Appearance(s) in EFL Trophy) | 0 | 27 | 0 |
| Chorley | 2020–21 | National League North | 9 | 0 | 3 | 0 | — | | 1 (Note: Appearance(s) in FA Trophy) | 0 | 13 | 0 |
| Chorley | 2021–22 | National League North | 27 | 0 | 0 | 0 | — | | 1 (Note: Appearance(s) in National League North play-offs) | 0 | 28 | 0 |
| Chorley | 2022–23 | National League North | 33 | 0 | 0 | 0 | — | | 1 | 0 | 34 | 0 |
| Chorley | 2023–24 | National League North | 35 | 3 | 0 | 0 | — | | 6 (Note: Four appearances in FA Trophy, Two appearances in National League North play-offs) | 0 | 41 | 3 |
| Chorley | 2024–25 | National League North | 41 | 0 | 2 | 0 | — | | 4 (Note: Two appearances in FA Trophy, Two appearances in National League North play-offs) | 1 | 47 | 1 |
| Chorley | Total | | 145 | 3 | 3 | 0 | — | | 11 | 1 | 163 | 4 |
| Career total | | | 262 | 4 | 18 | 0 | 2 | 0 | 12 | 1 | 298 | 5 |

=== International ===
As of match played 28 March 2016

Appearances and goals by national team and year
| National team | Year | Apps | Goals |
|---|---|---|---|
| Wales | 2015 | 1 | 0 |
| Wales | 2016 | 1 | 0 |
| Total | | 2 | 0 |
