= Lancashire Telegraph =

Newspaper published in Lancashire, England

- Type: Daily newspaper
- Format: Tabloid
- Owner: USA Today Co.
- Publisher: Newsquest
- Founded: 1886
- Headquarters: 50–54 Church Street, Blackburn
- Country: United Kingdom
- Circulation: 2,703 (as of 2024)
- ISSN: 1746-0522
- Website: LancashireTelegraph.co.uk

The Lancashire Telegraph, formerly the Lancashire Evening Telegraph, is a local tabloid newspaper distributed in East Lancashire, England. It is edited by Richard Duggan. The Lancashire Telegraph prints Monday to Saturday. There are around twenty towns in the area, including Blackburn, Burnley, Accrington, Darwen, Nelson, Clitheroe, Colne and Rawtenstall.

As well as being editor of the Lancashire Telegraph, Duggan is the regional editor of Newsquest's newspaper brands across the North West, including The Bolton News, Bury Times, The Oldham Times, Warrington Guardian and Wirral Globe. The newspapers are owned by Newsquest, a division of Gannett, a firm based in the United States.

== History ==
The newspaper was founded by Thomas Purvis Ritzema, a young newspaper manager, who purchased two shops at 19 and 21 Railway Road, Blackburn, for the launch of his venture. The first copy appeared on the streets on 26 October 1886, and sold for a ha’penny. It was known then as the Northern Daily Telegraph, and it was the first evening newspaper to be published in East Lancashire.

In 1894, the head office was moved to the corner site of Railway Road and High Street.

From 7 September 1939, soon after the start of World War II, advertisements gave way to news on the front page.

On 10 December 1956, it changed its title to the Northern Evening Telegraph and on 2 September 1963, the name changed again to Lancashire Evening Telegraph.

The newspaper used full colour for the first time on 11 November 1963, with spot colour introduced on 25 January 1965, and colour in classified advertising following on 19 March 1965.

In 1982, it moved to the south side of High Street, which marked the introduction of new computerised technology.

The new offices were built on part of the Dutton's brewery site; the old offices were demolished, and after the remainder of the brewery closed in the mid-1980s, a Morrisons supermarket was built on the site.

In 1995, the Lancashire Evening Telegraph became the first regional newspaper in Britain to put daily, updated news on the internet.

In February 2006, in order to cut costs, the company announced it was to close its district offices in the Lancashire towns of Burnley, Accrington and Darwen.

On 17 July 2006, the newspaper changed its name to the Lancashire Telegraph, as it switched to overnight printing, in order to distribute copies in the morning.

In March 2017, the newspaper moved to Church Street, and the offices on High Street were converted into flats. It is now based at the Freckleton Business Centre on Freckleton Street.
