= Laurence Batty =

English footballer

Personal information
- Full name: Laurence William Batty
- Date of birth: 15 February 1964 (age 62)
- Place of birth: Westminster, England
- Height: 6 ft 0 in (1.83 m)
- Position: Goalkeeper

Youth career
- 1979–1982: S.C. Farense

Senior career*
Years	Team	Apps	(Gls)
1982–1983	S.C. Farense		
1983–1984	Maidenhead United		
1984–1991	Fulham	9	(0)
1987–1988	→ Crystal Palace (loan)	0	(0)
1991	→ Brentford (loan)	0	(0)
1991	Brentford	0	(0)
1991–2000	Woking	313	(4)
2000	→ Chesham United (loan)		
2000	St Albans City	10	(0)
- Maidenhead United
2001–2002	Molesey		
2002–2003	Walton & Hersham		

International career
1993–1995	England Semi-Pro	5	(0)

Managerial career
- 2003: Walton & Hersham (player-manager)
- * Club domestic league appearances and goals

Laurence William Batty (born 15 February 1964), sometimes known as George Batty, is an English retired footballer who played as a goalkeeper, best remembered for his nine years in the higher echelons of non-League football with Woking, for whom he made over 500 appearances. He was capped by England at Semi-Pro level. Later in his career, Batty player-managed Walton & Hersham and became a goalkeeping coach.

== Club career ==
=== Early years ===
A goalkeeper, Batty began his career in Portugal in the youth system at S.C. Farense. He progressed to the first team squad for the 1982–83 Segunda Divisão season, but he failed to make an appearance and returned to England to sign for Isthmian League First Division club Maidenhead United in 1983. He left the club at the end of the 1982–83 season.

=== Fulham ===
Batty moved up to the Football League to sign for Second Division club Fulham in August 1984. He made just 12 appearances in a seven-year spell and spent time away on loan at Crystal Palace, before departing Craven Cottage in April 1991.

=== Brentford ===
Batty dropped down to the Third Division to sign for Brentford on loan in February 1991, with Tony Parks moving the other way on loan. Two months later, he signed a contract until the end of the season. He failed to receive a call into the first team squad and instead played for the reserves, making five appearances before departing at the end of the 1990–91 season.

=== Woking ===
Batty returned to Non-League football to sign for Isthmian League First Division club Woking during the 1991 off-season. He was an ever-present in the league in his first season and collected the first silverware of his career with the First Division title, which the Cards won at a canter. Rarely for a goalkeeper, Batty also scored four goals during the season, three penalties and one from open play in a match versus Wivenhoe Town. His performances also won him the club's Player of the Year award. Playing in the Conference for the 1992–93 season, Batty made 39 appearances as the Cards consolidated their position with an eighth-place finish. He continued to be a first team regular over the following three seasons, in which Woking challenged for promotion to the Football League with a third-place and two runners-up finishes in the Conference. Despite frustration in the league, Batty won four cups during those three seasons, collecting two FA Trophies and two Surrey Senior Cups.

Batty made 32 appearances during the 1996–97 season, an eventful campaign in which he missed six weeks with a fractured hand, won his third FA Trophy and helped the Cards take Premiership club Coventry City to a replay in the third round of the FA Cup. After his third FA Trophy win, he said "the first one is the most special but I was delighted to keep a clean sheet for the first time at Wembley". As a recognition of Batty's continued service, he was awarded a testimonial versus former club Fulham in August 1999. Batty continued to play on until the end of the 1999–00 season, having seen his appearance-count diminish over the previous two seasons with the emergence of young understudy Darryl Flahavan. In the summer of 2000, Batty stalled over signing a new one-year contract and was then released by manager Colin Lippiatt in a summer clearout. Batty made over 500 appearances and scored five goals during his 9 years with Woking.

=== Later years ===
Batty finished his career with spells at Isthmian League clubs Chesham United, St Albans City, Molesey, Walton & Hersham and a second spell with Maidenhead United.

== International career ==
Batty's good form while with Woking saw him capped by England Semi-Pro at international level.

== Managerial career ==
=== Molesey ===
While with Molesey, Batty combined his playing duties with that of the assistant manager's role.

=== Walton and Hersham ===
After the sacking of Matt Alexander in December 2002, Batty was named as caretaker manager. He accepted the manager's job on a full-time basis in January 2003, before being sacked in December that year.

== Coaching career ==
Batty has held goalkeeper coaching roles at Woking, Fulham (first team, academy and ladies), Chelsea (youth team and academy) and Brentford. He has a link with manager Paul Lambert, having served as first team goalkeeping coach under Lambert at Wycombe Wanderers, Norwich City and most recently Blackburn Rovers. He holds FA Level 3 and UEFA B coaching badges. He co-founded BedHead FC and the Guy Mascolo Football Charity.

== Personal life ==
Batty is the son of songwriter Steve Wolfe. He moved with his parents to Portugal as a teenager. Batty had a role in the 1992 BBC Screen One episode Born Kicking and played the part of the goalkeeper.

== Career statistics ==
Appearances and goals by club, season and competition
Club	Season	League			National Cup		League Cup		Other		Total	
Club	Season	Division	Apps	Goals	Apps	Goals	Apps	Goals	Apps	Goals	Apps	Goals
Fulham	1985–86	Second Division	2	0	0	0	0	0	―		2	0
Fulham	1986–87	Third Division	2	0	0	0	0	0	0	0	2	0
Fulham	1988–89	Third Division	1	0	0	0	0	0	0	0	1	0
Fulham	1989–90	Third Division	2	0	0	0	0	0	0	0	2	0
Fulham	1990–91	Third Division	2	0	1	0	2	0	0	0	5	0
Fulham	Total		9	0	1	0	2	0	0	0	12	0
St Albans City	2000–01	Isthmian League Premier Division	10	0	1	0	―		1 (Note: Appearance in Isthmian League Cup)	0	12	0
Career total			19	0	2	0	2	0	1	0	24	0

== Honours ==
Woking

- Isthmian League First Division: 1991–92
- FA Trophy: 1993–94, 1994–95, 1996–97
- Surrey Senior Cup: 1993–94, 1995–96, 1999–00

Individual

- Woking Player of the Year: 1991–92
