= Bengali-Fodé Koita =

Guinean footballer (born 1990)

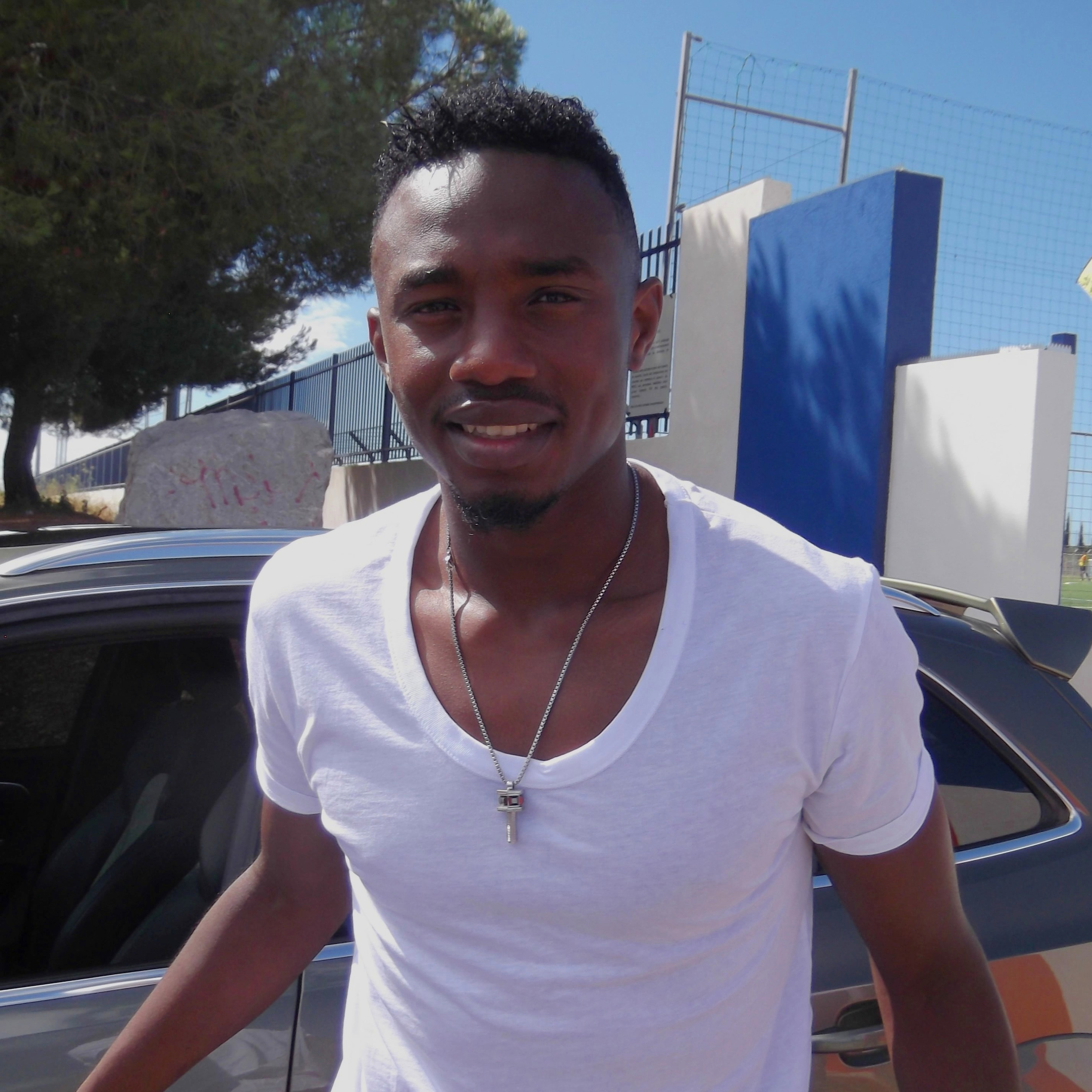

Personal information
- Date of birth: 21 October 1990 (age 36)
- Place of birth: Paris, France
- Height: 1.86 m (6 ft 1 in)
- Position: Striker

Team information
- Current team: Ümraniyespor
- Number: 55

Youth career
- 2006–2009: Montpellier

Senior career*
Years	Team	Apps	(Gls)
2009–2013	Montpellier	16	(0)
2012	→ Lens (loan)	17	(3)
2012–2013	→ Le Havre (loan)	22	(3)
2013–2015	Caen	57	(7)
2015–2016	Blackburn Rovers	14	(0)
2016–2021	Kasımpaşa	100	(27)
2021–2023	Trabzonspor	18	(0)
2022–2023	→ Kasımpaşa (loan)	14	(3)
2023–2025	Sivasspor	50	(13)
2025–2026	Iğdır	27	(7)
2026–	Ümraniyespor	3	(0)

International career^{‡}
2011	France U21	2	(0)
2019	Guinea	4	(0)
- * Club domestic league appearances and goals as of 12 October 2026 ‡ National team caps and goals as of 22:23, 14 July 2019 (UTC)

Bengali-Fodé Koita (born 21 October 1990) is a professional footballer who plays as a striker for Turkish TFF 1. Lig club Ümraniyespor. Born in France, he represented it on junior level, before switching allegiance to Guinea.

== Club career ==
Koita was born in Paris, France. He made his professional debut for Montpellier on 16 January 2009, in a Ligue 2 game against Amiens SC. He scored his first goal against Lyon in a 3–2 defeat.

On 21 July 2015, he signed a two-year contract at English club Blackburn Rovers of the Football League Championship. However, Koita struggled to make an impact at the club and failed to score a single goal in his fourteen appearances. On 27 January 2016, he signed for Turkish club Kasımpaşa S.K. for a fee of €320,000.

== International career ==
He was called up to the Guinea national team by manager Luis Fernández for the 2017 Africa Cup of Nations.

He made his Guinea national football team debut on 11 June 2019 in a friendly against Benin, as a starter.

== Honours ==
Trabzonspor

- Süper Lig: 2021–22

== Career statistics ==
=== International ===
As of matches played on 14 July 2019

Guinea national team
Year	Apps	Goals
2019	4	0
Total	4	0
