= Sacha Petshi =

French footballer (born 1992)

Personal information
- Full name: Sacha Petshi
- Date of birth: 21 June 1992 (age 34)
- Place of birth: Villepinte, France
- Height: 1.93 m (6 ft 4 in)
- Position: Defensive midfielder

Team information
- Current team: Hapoel Rishon LeZion
- Number: 2

Youth career
- 2007–2009: Troyes

Senior career*
Years	Team	Apps	(Gls)
2009–2013	Troyes	2	(0)
2012–2013	→ Orléans (loan)	13	(0)
2014	Sloboda Užice	9	(0)
2014–2015	Bastia	22	(1)
2015–2016	Blackburn Rovers	0	(0)
2016	Créteil	12	(0)
2017	Laval	2	(0)
2017–2018	Créteil	23	(1)
2018–2019	Senica	22	(2)
2020	Perak FA II	10	(2)
2021	RoPS	7	(0)
2021–2022	Engordany	20	(2)
2022–2023	Hapoel Afula	35	(2)
2023–2024	Hapoel Umm al-Fahm	32	(3)
2024–	Hapoel Rishon LeZion	31	(0)
- * Club domestic league appearances and goals as of 15 June 2025

Sacha Petshi (born 21 June 1992) is a French footballer who plays as a defensive midfielder for Hapoel Rishon LeZion.

== Club career ==
Petshi arrived to Troyes in 2007. He made his senior team debut on 11 August 2009 against Paris FC, which was his only appearance during the 2009–10 Championnat National season. In the following season, 2010–11, Petshi played regularly with Troyes B. Afterwards, he made two appearances for the first team in the 2011–12 Ligue 2 season. On 16 June 2012, Petshi signed his first professional contract with Troyes, but was immediately loaned to Orléans for the 2012–13 season.

In January 2014, Petshi joined Serbian side Sloboda Užice. He made 9 appearances in the Serbian SuperLiga, however at the end of the season Sloboda got relegated. Petshi left Sloboda and returned to France where he joined CA Bastia.

On 11 July 2015, he had a trial match with Blackburn Rovers against Accrington Stanley. He then signed on a one-year deal.
