= Hope Akpan =

Nigerian footballer

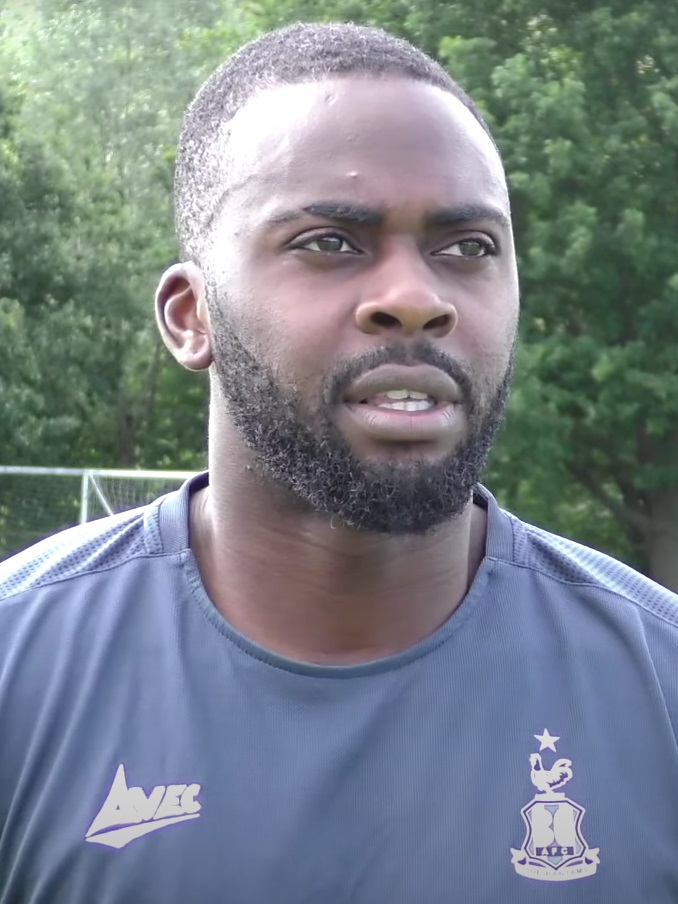
- Akpan in July 2019

Personal information
- Full name: Hope Ini Ita Akpan
- Date of birth: 14 August 1991 (age 35)
- Place of birth: Liverpool, England
- Height: 6 ft 0 in (1.82 m)
- Position: Midfielder

Youth career
- Everton

Senior career*
Years	Team	Apps	(Gls)
2009–2011	Everton	0	(0)
2011	→ Hull City (loan)	2	(0)
2011–2013	Crawley Town	47	(5)
2013–2015	Reading	58	(1)
2015–2017	Blackburn Rovers	60	(4)
2017–2018	Burton Albion	25	(2)
2018–2020	Bradford City	47	(5)
2021	SJK	3	(0)
2021	SJK Akatemia	1	(0)
2022	Atherton Laburnum Rovers		
2022	Widnes		
Total		244	(17)

International career
2014–2015	Nigeria	4	(0)
- * Club domestic league appearances and goals

Hope Ini Ita Akpan (born 14 August 1991) is a former professional footballer who played as a midfielder.

He came through the youth ranks at Everton, making his first-team debut in 2009. He later played for Hull City (on loan), Crawley Town, Reading, Blackburn Rovers, Burton Albion and Bradford City. He became Bradford City's captain in March 2019, but lost the captaincy at the end of that season. He left the club at the end of the following season, signing for Finnish club SJK in January 2021. He left the club in July 2021. In January 2022 he returned to England and played non-league football with Atherton Laburnum Rovers and Widnes.

Born in England, he represented Nigeria at international level.

== Club career ==
=== Everton ===
Born in Liverpool, Merseyside, Akpan began his career at Everton at eight years old and after progressing through the ranks, he became a regular for the academy under coach Neil Dewsnip. Then in 2008, Akpan was promoted to the club's reserve under coach Andy Holden and signed his first professional contract by the end of the year.

Having been included in the first team as an unused substitute in the 2009–10 season, Akpan made his competitive debut for Everton against BATE on 17 December 2009 in the UEFA Europa League.

On 17 March 2011, Akpan moved on loan to Championship side Hull City for the remainder of the 2010–11 season. Akpan made his Hull City debut, where he came on as a substitute for Corry Evans in the early first half substitute, and set up a goal for David Amoo, in a 1–1 draw against Queens Park Rangers on 25 April 2011. He also made another appearance in the last game of the season, in a 3–0 loss against Bristol City. Akpan went on to make no more appearances for Hull City and upon returning to his parent club, he was released by the club.

=== Crawley Town ===
After leaving Everton, Akpan signed for newly promoted League Two club Crawley Town on a free transfer on 14 June 2011.

Akpan scored on his Crawley Town debut but was sent-off in the last minutes for a second bookable offence, in a 3–2 win over AFC Wimbledon in the qualification round of the League Cup. The game was notable for another reason as Akpan was the first Black Player to represent Crawley following their elevation to Football League status. After serving a one match suspension, Akpan returned to the first team and set up a goal for Wes Thomas, in a 2–0 win over Macclesfield Town on 13 August 2011. After being sidelined from the first team for a month, he then scored again on 29 October 2011, in a 1–1 draw against Accrington Stanley. Despite being left out of the squad for the second time this season, Akpan, nevertheless, remained in the first team, forming a midfield partnership with Dannie Bulman However, although the club were promoted to League One, Akpan ended the season when he was sent-off in the sixth minutes for lunging Jason Prior, who had to be substituted, in a 1–1 draw against AFC Wimbledon on 14 April 2012. For this, he was suspended and never played for the remainder of the season. At the end of the 2011–12 season, Akpan went on to make thirty-three appearances and scoring two times in all competitions.

Ahead of the 2012–13 season, Akpan was named by local newspaper Crawley Observer as a player to watch for the new season. He started the 2012–13 season well when he set up two goals in the opening game of the season, with a 3–0 win over Scunthorpe United. However, Apkan was then sent-off for a second bookable offence, in a 3–0 loss against Portsmouth on 9 September 2012. He scored his first goal of the season on 25 September 2012, in a 3–2 loss against Swansea City in the third round of the League Cup A week later, on 2 October 2012, Akpan scored again, in a 3–1 win over Bournemouth. He scored two more goals by the end of October against Bury and Hartlepool United. However, Akpan was sent-off for the second time this season when he was sent-off for a straight red card, in a 1–1 draw against Oldham Athletic on 27 October 2012. Following the match, Akpan was the recipient of online racist abuse. For his sending off against Oldham Athletic, Akpan served a three-match suspension. After this, Akpan then scored again on 15 December 2012, in a 2–1 win over Stevenage. Akpan soon came under criticism from Manager Richie Barker for being suspended for the third time this season and was told to clean up his act if he was fulfill his target. Despite this, Akpan went on to make twenty-seven appearances and scoring five times in all competitions.

=== Reading ===
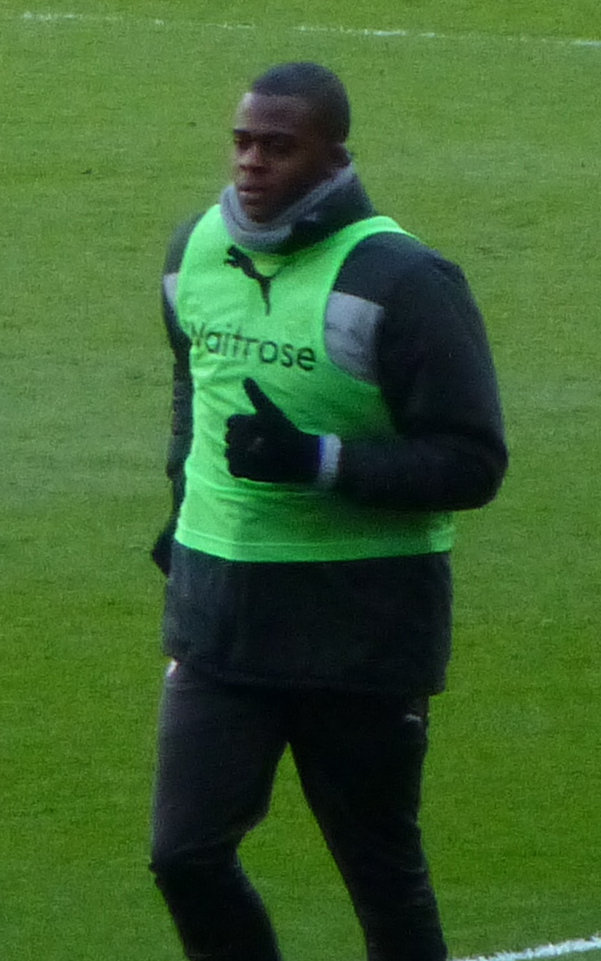
Akpan warming up for Reading in 2013

Akpan signed for Premier League side Reading on a three-and-a-half-year contract on 8 January 2013. He stated his desire to help his new club avoid relegation.

Akpan made his Reading debut on 19 January 2013 against Newcastle United, where he came on as a second-half substitute, and set up a winning goal for Adam Le Fondre, in a 2–1 win. This was followed up on 30 January 2013 when he set up two goals again for Le Fondre, in a 2–2 draw against Chelsea. However, after a handful of first team appearance, Akpan suffered ankle injury during a match against Southampton on 6 April 2013. Although he returned from injury, Akpan remained as an unused substitute for the rest of the season, as they were relegated from the Premier League. At the end of the 2012–13 season, Akpan made nine appearances for the side.

In the 2013–14 season, Akpan found himself out of the first team at the start of the season, as he cited as "lacking fitness." As a result, Akpan wanted to leave the club on loan to get first team football. However, Manager Nigel Adkins warned Akpan that he would need to work hard to earn himself more playing time. It wasn't until around January when Akpan regained his first team place following an injury of Danny Guthrie. He scored his first goal for the club, in a 7–1 win over Bolton Wanderers on 18 January 2014. Despite suffering from injury, Akpan remained in the first team throughout the season and went on to make thirty-one appearances and scoring once in all competitions.

In the 2014–15 season, Akpan continued to remain in the first team since the start of the season and formed a partnership with new signing Oliver Norwood. The partnership continued until Akpan suffered a dislocated shoulder whilst on international duty with Nigeria and sidelined for three months. After returning from injury, He made his return from injury, coming on as a late substitute, in a 2–1 win over Wolverhampton Wanderers on 7 February 2015. However, since returning from injury, Akpan's first team opportunities was limited later in the season and was demoted on the substitute bench. At the end of the 2014–15 season, Akpan went on to make twenty-four appearances in all competitions.

=== Blackburn Rovers ===
On 10 August 2015, he was linked with a transfer to Blackburn Rovers. The following day, Akpan had his contract terminated by Reading, and completed a two-year contract to join Rovers.

Akpan made his Blackburn Rovers debut, coming on as a second-half substitute, in a 1–1 draw against Huddersfield Town on 15 August 2015. Akpan then scored his first goal for Blackburn in a 2–2 draw with Sheffield Wednesday on 28 November 2015. Since making his debut for Blackburn Rovers, Akpan quickly established himself in the first team and has become the club's fan favourite. His second goal then came on 12 January 2016, in a 1–1 draw against Queens Park Rangers. After being sidelined with injury, he scored on his return on 1 March 2016, in a 3–1 win over Middlesbrough. Despite being sidelined on three more occasions later in the season, Akpan finished his first season, making thirty-seven appearances and scoring three times in all competitions.

In the 2016–17 season, Akpan started the season well when he scored in a 4–3 win over Crewe Alexandra in the second round of the EFL Cup. However, Akpan found himself on the substitute bench for the number of matches, due to competitions. Akpan then scored and set up another goal for the side, in a 3–2 loss against Ipswich Town on 14 January 2017. However, Akpan was sent-off for pushing referee Scott Duncan after his goal was disallowed for handball, in a 2–1 loss against Sheffield Wednesday on 14 February 2017. For his action, he was charged by the FA and subsequently served a four match suspension. Following his return from suspension, Akpan mostly spent the rest of the season on the substitute bench, as the club were relegated to League One. Despite further setback of suspension and injury, He was released by Blackburn at the end of the 2016–17 season.

=== Burton Albion ===
Following his release by Blackburn, Akpan signed a one-year contract with Burton Albion on 18 July 2017. Upon joining the club, he was given a number twenty-one shirt for the new season.

Akpan made his Burton Albion debut, coming on as a second-half substitute for Marvin Sordell, in a 1–0 loss against Cardiff City in the opening game of the season. He was offered a new contract by the club at the end of the 2017–18 season, following their relegation.

=== Bradford City ===
He signed for Bradford City in July 2018. He was recommended to the club by former Bradford City player Stephen Warnock, who had played with him at Burton Albion. After losing in their opening home game of the season, Akpan spoke about the squad's need to play as a team. Akpan was injured for six weeks but returned to training in October 2018. In December 2018 Akpan praised fellow City midfielders David Ball, Lewis O'Brien and Jack Payne. In February 2019 manager David Hopkin stated he wanted Akpan to re-find his best form. In March 2019 Akpan replaced Paul Caddis as Bradford City's captain. Later that month he said he did not want the club to be relegated, particularly as he had been relegated during his two previous seasons (with Blackburn in 2016–17 and with Burton in 2017–18). The captaincy was removed at the end of the 2018–19 season.

At the start of the 2019–20 season, Akpan was dropped from the regular starting squad due to competition for places. He returned to the first-team following an injury to Matt Palmer, and was challenged by manager Gary Bowyer to fight for a regular place. On 5 October he scored his first league goal of the season, and Bowyer said that "in the last couple of weeks you've seen his attitude and desire and the hunger in his eyes again to make an impact". Later that month Akpan was described as being "rejuvenated" as a player.

On 26 May 2020 it was announced that he was one of 10 players who would leave Bradford City when their contract expired on 30 June 2020.

=== SJK ===
In January 2021 he signed for Finnish club SJK. He left the club in July 2021.

=== Return to England ===
In January 2022 he signed for Atherton Laburnum Rovers on non-contract terms. He moved to Widnes in March 2022.

== International career ==
Born to Nigerian parents in England, in 2013 Akpan declared his intention to represent Nigeria at international level.

Akpan received his first call-up to the Nigerian national team in October 2014. He made his debut later that month, on 15 October 2014, in an African Cup of Nations qualifying match.

== Personal life ==
Akpan was charged with misconduct by the Football Association in November 2011, after homophobic comments were posted on his Twitter account. Despite insisting that someone else had posted the comments, he admitted the charge after no one came forward to claim responsibility, and he was fined £1,200 by the FA.

Growing up, Akpan supported Liverpool despite progressing in the Everton youth set-up. At school, Akpan was described as "a bright student", achieving seven As at GCSE. He also described himself as "a northern boy".

While at Reading, Akpan took part in the community work, leading him nominated PFA's Player in the Community award.

== Career statistics ==
As of 31 December 2021

Appearances and goals by club, season and competition
Club	Season	League			Cup (Note: Includes FA Cup and Suomen Cup)		League Cup		Other		Total	
Club	Season	Division	Apps	Goals	Apps	Goals	Apps	Goals	Apps	Goals	Apps	Goals
Everton	2009–10	Premier League	0	0	0	0	0	0	1 (Note: Appearance(s) in UEFA Europa League.)	0	1	0
Everton	2010–11	Premier League	0	0	0	0	0	0	0	0	0	0
Everton	Total		0	0	0	0	0	0	1	0	1	0
Hull City (loan)	2010–11	Championship	2	0	0	0	0	0	0	0	2	0
Crawley Town	2011–12	League Two	26	1	4	0	2	1	1 (Note: Appearance(s) in Football League Trophy.)	0	33	2
Crawley Town	2012–13	League One	21	4	2	0	3	2	1	0	27	6
Crawley Town	Total		47	5	6	0	5	3	2	0	60	8
Reading	2012–13	Premier League	9	0	0	0	0	0	0	0	9	0
Reading	2013–14	Championship	29	1	0	0	1	0	0	0	30	1
Reading	2014–15	Championship	21	0	1	0	2	0	0	0	24	0
Reading	Total		59	1	1	0	3	0	0	0	63	1
Blackburn Rovers	2015–16	Championship	35	3	2	0	0	0	0	0	37	3
Blackburn Rovers	2016–17	Championship	25	1	2	0	2	1	0	0	29	2
Blackburn Rovers	Total		60	4	4	0	2	1	0	0	66	5
Burton Albion	2017–18	Championship	25	2	1	0	2	0	0	0	28	2
Bradford City	2018–19	League One	28	2	2	0	1	0	0	0	31	2
Bradford City	2019–20	League Two	19	3	2	0	1	0	1	1	22	4
Bradford City	Total		47	5	4	0	2	0	1	1	54	6
SJK Seinäjoki	2021	Veikkausliiga	3	0	1	0	–		–		4	0
SJK Akatemia	2021	Kakkonen	1	0	–		–		–		1	0
Career total			244	17	17	0	14	4	4	1	279	22
