= Jack Doyle (footballer) =

English footballer

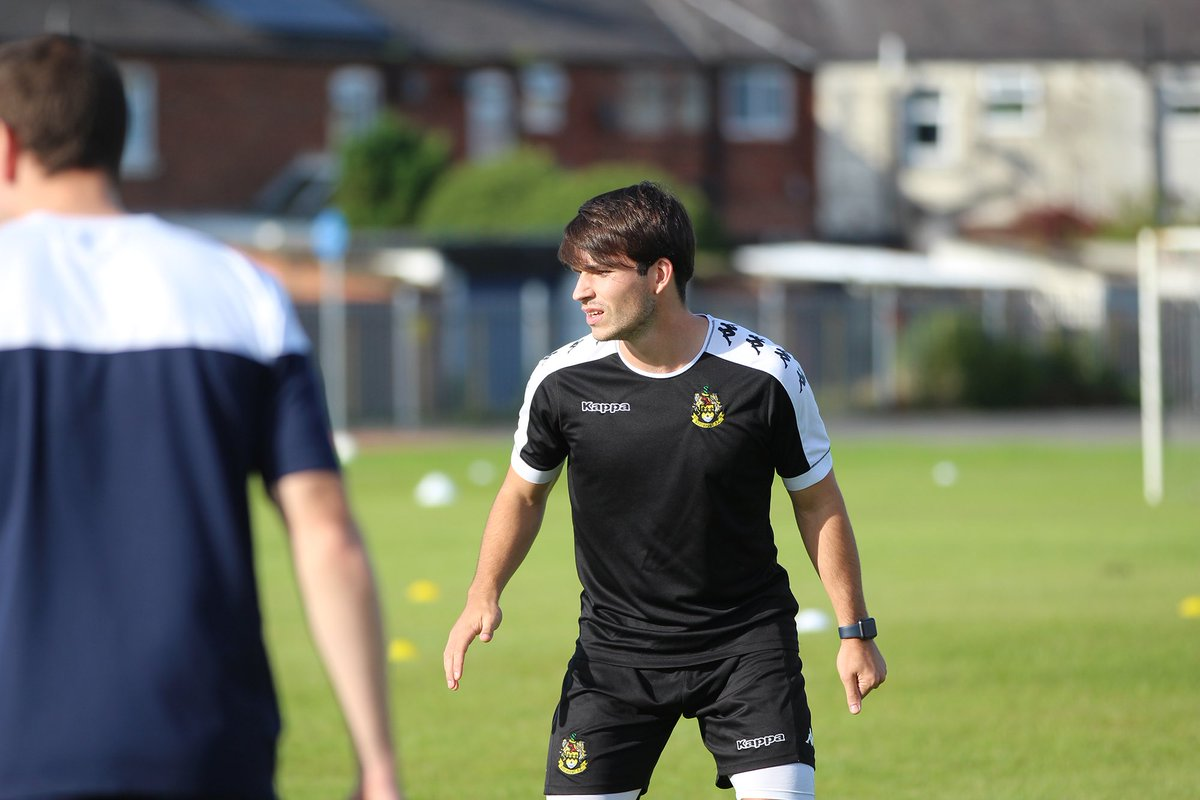
- Doyle training with Southport in 2020

Personal information
- Full name: Jack Marc Doyle
- Date of birth: 2 February 1997 (age 29)
- Place of birth: Liverpool, England
- Height: 1.78 m (5 ft 10 in)
- Position: Left back

Team information
- Current team: Warrington Town

Youth career
- 2012–2015: Blackburn Rovers

Senior career*
Years	Team	Apps	(Gls)
2015–2019	Blackburn Rovers	0	(0)
2018	→ Derry City (loan)	20	(1)
2018	→ Maidstone United (loan)	7	(0)
2019–2025	Southport		
2025–	Warrington Town		
- * Club domestic league appearances and goals as of 09:51, 25 May 2021 (BST)

Jack Marc Doyle (born 2 February 1997) is an English professional footballer who plays as a defender for Warrington Town.

== Career ==
=== Blackburn Rovers ===
In January 2017 Doyle signed his 1st professional contract at Blackburn Rovers penning a 2-year deal.

In August 2017 Doyle made his 1st team debut coming on as a substitute for Blackburn Rovers in the 3–1 2017–18 EFL Cup victory against Coventry City.

In September 2018 Doyle joined Maidstone United on loan. In November 2018 his loan was cut short due to injury.

On 15 May 2019 it was announced that Doyle will leave at the end of his contract.

=== Southport ===
On 1 August 2019 Doyle signed for Southport F.C.

=== Warrington Town ===
After six season with Southport he moved in 2025 to Warrington Town.

== Career statistics ==
As of match played 26 September 2017

Appearances and goals by club, season and competition
Club	Season	League			FA Cup		League Cup		Other		Total	
Club	Season	Division	Apps	Goals	Apps	Goals	Apps	Goals	Apps	Goals	Apps	Goals
Blackburn Rovers	2016–17	Championship	0	0	0	0	0	0	2 (Note: Appearances in the EFL Trophy with Blackburn's U23 side)	0	2	0
Blackburn Rovers	2017–18	League One	0	0	0	0	1	0	1 (Note: Appearance in the EFL Trophy)	0	2	0
Blackburn Rovers	Total		0	0	0	0	1	0	3	0	4	0
Career total			0	0	0	0	1	0	3	0	4	0
