= Derrick Williams (footballer) =

Irish footballer (born 1993)

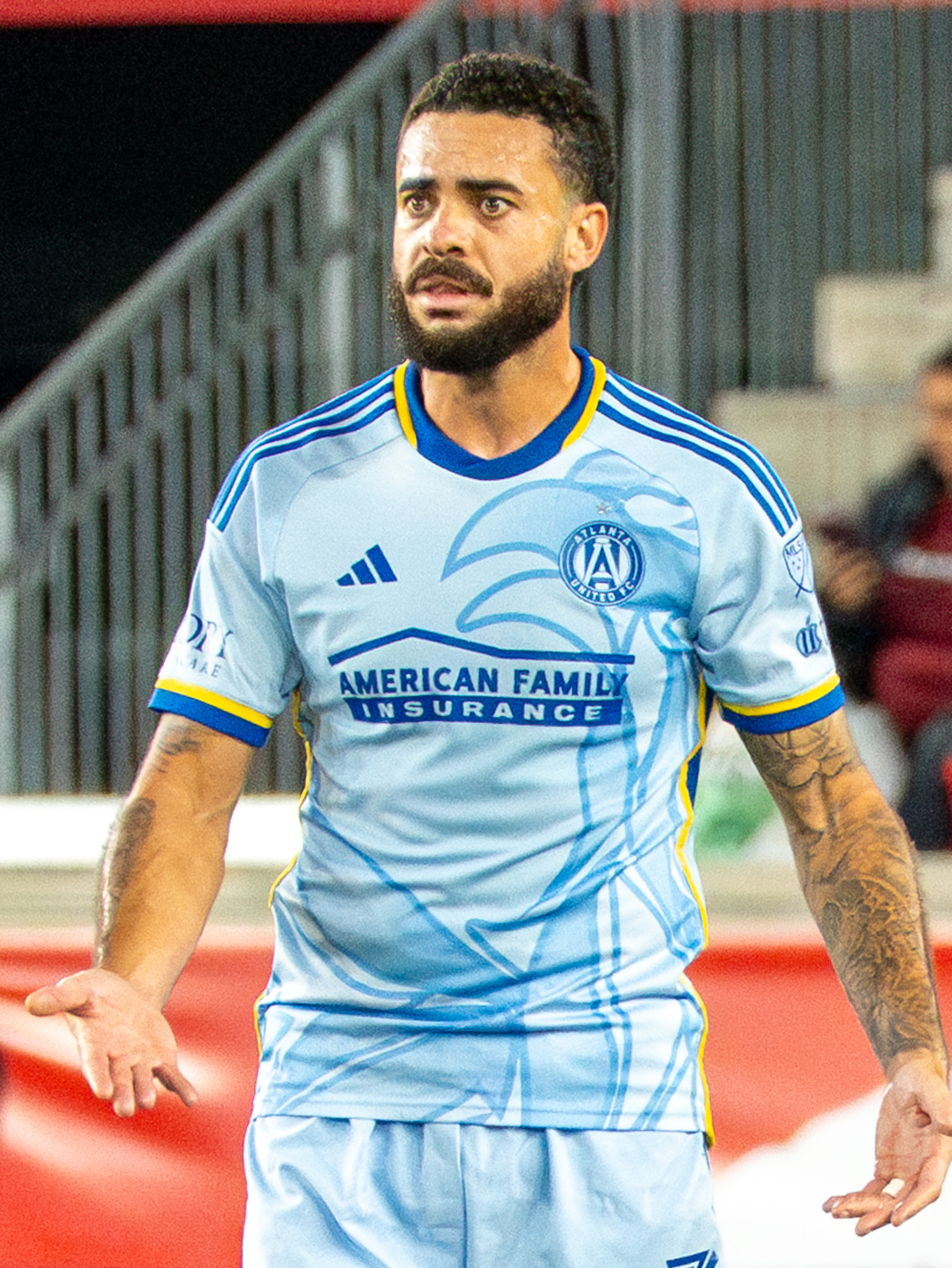
- Derrick Williams with Atlanta United FC in 2025

Personal information
- Full name: Derrick Shaun Williams
- Date of birth: 17 January 1993 (age 33)
- Place of birth: Hamburg, Germany
- Height: 5 ft 11 in (1.80 m)
- Position: Centre back

Youth career
- Tramore AFC
- 2009–2012: Aston Villa

Senior career*
Years	Team	Apps	(Gls)
2011–2013	Aston Villa	1	(0)
2013–2016	Bristol City	111	(4)
2016–2021	Blackburn Rovers	138	(6)
2021–2022	LA Galaxy	47	(0)
2022–2023	D.C. United	24	(1)
2024–2025	Atlanta United	44	(1)
2025–2026	Reading	22	(0)

International career^{‡}
2011–2012	Republic of Ireland U19	8	(0)
2012–2013	Republic of Ireland U21	6	(0)
2018–2019	Republic of Ireland	3	(1)
- * Club domestic league appearances and goals as of 30 March 2026 (UTC) ‡ National team caps and goals as of 11:30, 20 October 2022 (UTC)

Derrick Shaun Williams (born 17 January 1993) is a former professional footballer who played as a centre-back. A product of the Aston Villa Academy, having signed as a youngster from his local side Tramore AFC in County Waterford, he also played in England for Bristol City, Blackburn Rovers and Reading. Born in Germany, he played for the Republic of Ireland internationally.

== Early life ==
Williams was born in Hamburg, Germany in 1993, to an Irish mother and an African-American father. With his father serving in the United States Army at the time, Williams moved regularly during spells in Germany and the United States. In 2000, when Williams was seven years old, the family eventually settled in Tramore, County Waterford in Ireland. It was here where he began playing football, and was later spotted playing for Tramore Athletic and Waterford. At the age of 15, he was offered a contract by Manchester United, however he decided to join Aston Villa instead in January 2009, due to their success in developing academy players into first team players.

== Club career ==
=== Aston Villa ===
Following a number of injuries to Alex McLeish's first team squad in the latter stages of the 2011–12 season, the versatile defender was brought in to train with the first team on a number of occasions. His first competitive involvement with the first team saw him earn a place on the bench for the defeats to Arsenal and Chelsea, and the draw with Liverpool.

Williams made his first-team debut under Paul Lambert, as a substitute in Villa's 1–1 Premier League draw against Queens Park Rangers on 1 December 2012.

=== Bristol City ===
After struggling to make it into the Aston Villa first team, Williams signed for Bristol City, newly relegated to League One, on a three-year contract on 24 June 2013. He made his debut in a 2–0 away win at Gillingham in the League Cup on 6 August, and continued to solidify his place in the line up, starting almost every league match for City that season. His first professional goal came on 15 February 2014, in a 2–2 draw at home to Tranmere Rovers.

Bristol City started the 2014–15 League One season with a 16-match unbeaten run, a club record, and the second longest unbeaten run in the country at the time, only behind Chelsea. Williams was a key fixture in this run, starting every match. His first goal of the season came in this run, in a 3–2 home win over Chesterfield on 11 October, and his second was scored in a Football League Trophy win over Coventry City in early December. Williams was sent off for the first time in his career in a 1–0 away defeat at the hands of Crewe Alexandra, forcing him to miss the following match. Williams played in the Football League Trophy final at Wembley Stadium on 22 March 2015, a match in which City beat Walsall 2–0, becoming the only side to have won the competition three times. He was a regular in the City side that confirmed promotion to the Championship with three matches of the season still to go.

=== Blackburn Rovers ===
On 26 August 2016, Williams joined Championship club Blackburn Rovers on a three-year contract. He scored his first goal for the club in a 1–1 draw against Cardiff City where he found the equaliser in the 90th minute of the match. In his first season with the club, he managed to make 39 appearances in the league and three in the FA Cup. He was also named as the Player of the Season.

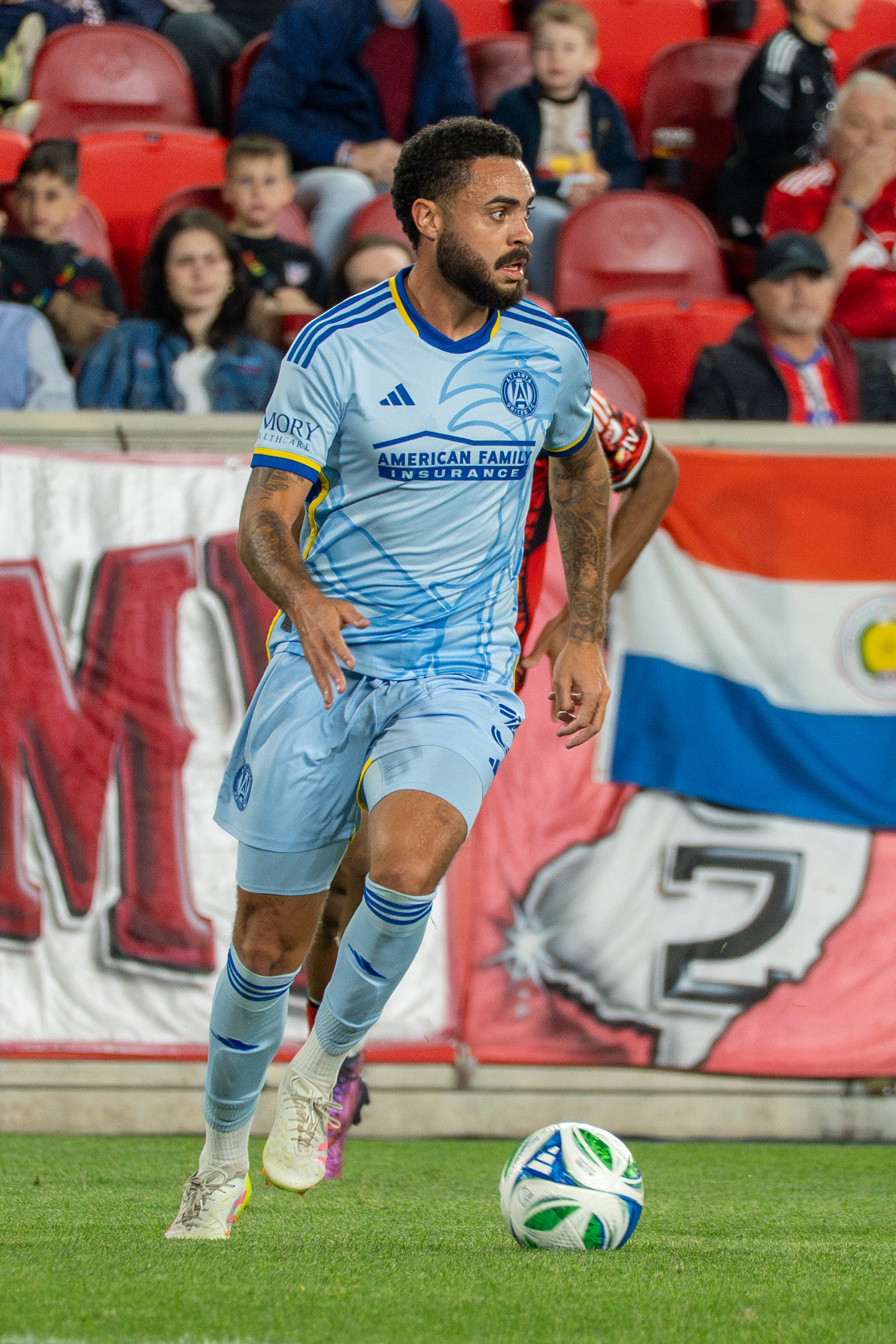
Derrick Williams during New York Red Bulls vs Atlanta United on May 31 2025

=== LA Galaxy ===
On 4 March 2021, Williams moved to the United States and joined Major League Soccer club LA Galaxy after his contract with Blackburn Rovers was cancelled by mutual consent.

=== D.C. United ===
On 10 November 2022, Williams was traded to D.C. United in exchange for $180,000 in General Allocation Money.

=== Atlanta United ===
On 22 December 2023, Williams was selected by Atlanta United in the second stage of the MLS Re-Entry Draft. On 12 January 2024, Atlanta announced that it had signed Williams on a two-year deal with an option for a third.

=== Reading ===
On 15 August 2025, Williams signed a two-year contract with Reading.

On 22 June 2026, Williams announced his retirement from football.

== International career ==
Williams was eligible to play for Germany, the United States, and the Republic of Ireland. In February 2011, he made his debut for the Republic of Ireland U19 team against Croatia U19, before going onto play in three of Ireland's four fixtures of the UEFA European Under-19 Championship later that year. On 10 September 2012, Williams made his debut for the Republic of Ireland U21 team, in a 4–2 victory over Italy U21. On 28 May 2018, he made his full senior international debut for the Republic of Ireland national football team in a friendly game against France at the Stade De France.

Williams scored his first senior goal in a friendly against New Zealand on Thursday, 14 November 2019

== Career statistics ==
=== Club ===
Appearances and goals by club, season and competition
Club	Season	League			National cup		League cup		Other		Total	
Club	Season	Division	Apps	Goals	Apps	Goals	Apps	Goals	Apps	Goals	Apps	Goals
Aston Villa	2011–12	Premier League	0	0	0	0	0	0	—		0	0
Aston Villa	2012–13	Premier League	1	0	0	0	0	0	—		1	0
Aston Villa	Total		1	0	0	0	0	0	—		1	0
Bristol City	2013–14	League One	43	1	2	0	3	0	0	0	48	1
Bristol City	2014–15	League One	44	2	4	0	1	0	6 (Note: Appearances in Football League Trophy)	1	55	3
Bristol City	2015–16	Championship	24	1	1	0	1	0	—		26	1
Bristol City	2016–17	Championship	0	0	—		2	0	—		2	0
Bristol City	Total		111	4	7	0	7	0	6	1	131	5
Blackburn Rovers	2016–17	Championship	39	1	3	0	—		—		42	1
Blackburn Rovers	2017–18	League One	45	1	3	0	2	0	1 (Note: Appearance in EFL Trophy)	0	51	1
Blackburn Rovers	2018–19	Championship	27	0	1	0	1	0	0	0	29	0
Blackburn Rovers	2019–20	Championship	17	3	1	0	1	0	0	0	19	3
Blackburn Rovers	2020–21	Championship	10	1	0	0	1	0	0	0	11	1
Blackburn Rovers	Total		138	6	8	0	5	0	1	0	152	6
LA Galaxy	2021	MLS	21	0	0	0	—		0	0	21	0
LA Galaxy	2022	MLS	27	0	2	0	—		2	0	30	0
LA Galaxy	Total		47	0	2	0	—		2	0	51	0
D.C. United	2023	MLS	24	1	—		—		—		24	1
Atlanta United	2024	MLS	27	0	—		1	0	5 (Note: Appearances in MLS playoffs)	1	33	1
Atlanta United	2025	MLS	17	1	—		1	0	—		18	1
Atlanta United	Total		44	1	—		2	0	5	1	51	2
Reading	2025–26	League One	24	0	0	0	0	0	0	0	24	0
Career total			390	12	17	0	14	0	14	2	435	14

=== International ===
As of match played 14 October 2020

Appearances and goals by national team and year
National team	Year	Apps	Goals
Republic of Ireland	2018	1	0
Republic of Ireland	2019	2	1
Total		3	1

Scores and results list the Republic of Ireland's goal tally first, score column indicates score after each Williams goal.

List of international goals scored by Derrick Williams
No.	Date	Venue	Opponent	Score	Result	Competition
1	14 November 2019	Aviva Stadium, Dublin, Ireland	New Zealand	1–1	3–1	Friendly

== Honours ==
Bristol City

- Football League One: 2014–15
- Football League Trophy: 2014–15

Blackburn Rovers

- EFL League One runner-up: 2017–18

Individual

- Blackburn Rovers Player of the Season: 2016–17

== See also ==
- List of Republic of Ireland international footballers born outside the Republic of Ireland
- Military brat (U.S. subculture)
