= 2016–17 Blackburn Rovers F.C. season =

Blackburn Rovers
2016–17 season
- Manager: Owen Coyle (until 21 February); Tony Mowbray (from 22 February)
- Stadium: Ewood Park
- Championship: 22nd (relegated)
- EFL Cup: Third round (vs. Leeds United)
- FA Cup: Fifth round (vs. Manchester United)
- Top goalscorer: League: Danny Graham (11); All: Danny Graham (12)
- Average home league attendance: 12,871
Home colours	Away colours	Third colours

The 2016–17 season is Blackburn Rovers' 129th season as a professional football club and its fifth playing in the Championship. Along with competing in the Championship, the club will also participate in the FA Cup and League Cup. The season covers the period from 1 July 2016 to 30 June 2017. Rovers were relegated to League One on 7 May 2017, in spite of their 3–1 away win against Brentford, with results elsewhere going against them.

== Summer Activity ==
=== May ===
On 12 May Rovers announced a five-year deal with kit supplier Umbro.

On 20 May Rovers announced their retained list, Tommy Spurr, Matthew Kilgallon, Chris Taylor, Chris Brown, Lee Williamson, Nathan Delfouneso, Simon Eastwood and Simeon Jackson would all be free to talk to and sign for other clubs upon the expiry of their contracts on 30 June. However, several players have been informed that final decisions over their futures will be made once a new manager has been appointed. Those under 24, Jack Doyle and Connor Thomson have agreed 1 year deals, scholars Josh Askew, Ramirez Howarth and Lewis Travis have also agreed to sign professional terms. Stuart Callaway, David Carson, Modou Cham, Ryan Crump, Anton Forrester, Devarn Green, Sam Joel, Sam Lavelle, Jan Pirretas, Jordan Preston, Hyuga Tanner and Luke Wall have been released.

=== June ===
On 1 June Rovers announced that Owen Coyle has been appointed as new manager on a 2-year deal.

On 17 June Rovers announced the signing of Anthony Stokes on a 3-year deal, following his release from Celtic.

On 18 June it was confirmed that Goalkeeping Coach Laurence Batty had left the club and that new Rovers manager Owen Coyle was in the process of firming up a new coach who would be in place before the players started training.

On 21 June Rovers announced the signing of Stephen Hendrie on a season-long loan from West Ham United.

On 23 June Rovers announced the signing of Danny Graham on a 2-year deal, following his release from Sunderland.

On 23 June Oxford United announced the signing of Simon Eastwood following his contract expiry.

On 25 June Rovers announced the signing of Liam Feeney on a 2-year deal, following his release from Bolton Wanderers.

On 27 June Preston North End announced the signing of Tommy Spurr, who was offered a new contract by Rovers, on a 3-year deal following his contract expiry.

On 29 June Rovers announced that Alan Irvine has mutually agreed to leave the club with immediate effect.

On 29 June Rovers announced the signing of Jack Byrne on a season-long loan from Manchester City.

=== July ===
On 1 July Bolton Wanderers announced the signing of Chris Taylor following his contract expiry.

On 4 July Rovers announced Sandy Stewart as assistant manager.

On 12 July Port Vale announced signing of Anton Forrester on a 2-year deal, following his release.

On 18 July Walsall announced signing of Simeon Jackson on a 2-year deal, following his release.

On 21 July Rovers announced the sale of Grant Hanley to Newcastle United for an undisclosed fee.

On 25 July Burton Albion announced signing of Lee Williamson on a 1-year deal, following his release.

=== August ===
On 1 August Bradford City announced signing of Matthew Kilgallon on a 1-year deal, following his release.

On 2 August Rovers announced the signing of Gordon Greer on a 1-year deal, following his release from Brighton & Hove Albion.

On 3 August Rovers announced that Rob Kelly has mutually agreed to leave the club with immediate effect.

On 5 August Rovers announced the appointment of John Henry as first team coach.

On 5 August Bury announced signing of Chris Brown on a 1-year deal, following his release.

On 8 August Rovers announced John O'Sullivan has joined Accrington Stanley on loan until 7 January.

On 11 August Rovers announced the signing of Sam Gallagher on a season long loan from Southampton.

On 25 August Rovers announced the signing of Martin Samuelsen on a season long loan from West Ham United.

On 26 August Rovers announced Shane Duffy has joined Brighton & Hove Albion for an undisclosed fee.

On 26 August Rovers announced the double signing of Tommie Hoban on a season long loan from Watford and Derrick William on a 3-year deal from Bristol City.

On 29 August Rovers announced squad numbers for the development squad for the EFL Trophy.

On 31 August Rovers announced the signing of Charlie Mulgrew on a 3-year deal following his release Celtic.

On 31 August Rovers announced the signing of Marvin Emnes on loan from Swansea City until 17 January 2017.

=== September ===
On 21 September Rovers announced the signing of Wes Brown on a free transfer following his release from Sunderland in the summer, he will also help coach the u23s team.

=== November ===
On 22 November Rovers announced Martin Samuelsen has returned to West Ham United with immediate effect.

=== December ===
On 5 December Rovers were drawn away against QPR in the third-round of the FA Cup.

== Winter Activity ==
=== January ===
On 5 January Rovers announced the appointment of Paul Senior as Football Director.

On 6 January Rovers announced Jack Byrne has returned to Manchester City with immediate effect.

On 9 January Blackburn were drawn at home against either Barnsley/Blackpool in the 4th round of the FA Cup .

On 9 January Rovers announced promising youngsters Jack Doyle & Connor Thomson have signed new deals till 2019.

On 17 January Rovers announced John O'Sullivan has left the club by mutual consent.

On 20 January Rovers announced Scott Wharton has joined Cambridge United on loan until the end of the season.

On 24 January Rovers announced Josh Askew has joined Warrington Town on loan.

On 27 January Rovers announced promising young midfielder Joe Rankin-Costello has signed his first professional deal till 2019.

On 30 January Rovers announced Lucas João has joined on loan from Sheffield Wednesday until the end of the season.

On 31 January Rovers announced Marvin Emnes has rejoined on loan from Swansea City until the end of the season.

On 31 January Rovers announced Ben Marshall has left the club to join Wolverhampton Wanderers for an undisclosed fee.

=== February ===
On 11 February Rovers announced Ramirez Howarth has joined Skelmersdale United on loan.

On 15 February Rovers announced Matthew Platt and Connor Thompson have joined Barrow on loan.

On 21 February Rovers announced that manager Owen Coyle has left the club by mutual consent, assistant manager Sandy Stewart, first team coach John Henry and goalkeeping coach Phil Hughes have also left the club.

On 22 February Rovers announced the appointment of Tony Mowbray as the club's new head coach, with Head of Academy coach David Lowe stepping up to become Assistant Manager and David Dunn stepping up to become 1st Team Coach.

=== March ===
On 2 March Rovers announced goalkeeper David Raya has signed a new deal till 2019.

== Squad information ==
Squad No.	Name	Nationality	Position(s)	Date of Birth (Age)	Contract Expires
Goalkeepers
1	Jason Steele	(England)	GK	18 August 1990 (age 36)	2018
33	David Raya	(Spain)	GK	15 September 1995 (age 31)	2019
Defenders
2	Adam Henley	(Wales)	DF	14 June 1994 (age 32)	2017
3	Gordon Greer	(Scotland)	DF	14 December 1980 (age 45)	2017
4	Tommie Hoban (on loan from Watford)	(Republic of Ireland)	DF	24 January 1994 (age 32)	—
5	Derrick Williams	(Republic of Ireland)	DF	17 January 1993 (age 33)	2019
6	Jason Lowe	(England)	DF	2 September 1991 (age 35)	2017
14	Charlie Mulgrew	(Scotland)	DF	6 March 1986 (age 40)	2019
15	Elliott Ward	(England)	DF	19 January 1985 (age 41)	2018
20	Stephen Hendrie (on loan from West Ham United)	(Scotland)	DF	8 January 1995 (age 31)	—
24	Ryan Nyambe	(Namibia)	DF	4 December 1997 (age 28)	2018
30	Wes Brown	(England)	DF	13 October 1979 (age 47)	2017
34	Scott Wharton	(England)	DF	3 October 1997 (age 29)	2018
36	Jack Doyle	(England)	DF	2 February 1997 (age 29)	2019
Midfielders
7	Liam Feeney	(England)	MF	21 January 1987 (age 39)	2018
21	Hope Akpan	(Nigeria)	MF	14 August 1991 (age 35)	2017
23	Danny Guthrie	(England)	MF	18 April 1987 (age 39)	2017
26	Darragh Lenihan	(Republic of Ireland)	MF	16 March 1994 (age 32)	2019
27	Willem Tomlinson	(England)	MF	27 January 1998 (age 28)	2018
28	Connor Mahoney	(England)	MF	12 February 1997 (age 29)	2017
29	Corry Evans	(Northern Ireland)	MF	30 July 1990 (age 36)	2019
31	Elliott Bennett	(Jamaica)	MF	18 December 1988 (age 37)	2018
32	Craig Conway	(Scotland)	MF	2 May 1985 (age 41)	2018
Forwards
9	Anthony Stokes	(Republic of Ireland)	FW	25 July 1988 (age 38)	2019
12	Danny Graham	(England)	FW	12 August 1985 (age 41)	2018
17	Marvin Emnes (on loan from Swansea City)	(Netherlands)	FW	27 May 1988 (age 38)	—
18	Lucas João (on loan from Sheffield Wednesday)	(Portugal)	FW	4 September 1994 (age 32)	—
19	Sam Gallagher (on loan from Southampton)	(England)	FW	15 September 1995 (age 31)	—

== Pre-season friendlies ==
On 23 May 2016, Blackburn Rovers announced five pre-season friendlies, with a sixth friendly expected to be confirmed at a later date. The games are during, and follow a six-day training camp in Austria from July 4–10 which included a friendly against Austrian Bundesliga side SV Ried.

Upon returning to England following the training camp, Rovers had three hour long friendlies in the shape of a tournament against Morecambe and Bury at Morecambe's Globe Arena. The following week Rovers will travel to Rochdale for a friendly at Spotland Stadium and Blackpool four days later at Bloomfield Road.

Rovers only friendly at Ewood Park was finally announced on 22 June against second tier Spanish team Girona.

9 July 2016 Friendly	SV Ried	0–1	Blackburn Rovers	Ried im Innkreis
18:00 UTC+01:00		Report	Graham 62'	Stadium: Keine Sorgen Arena

16 July 2016 Friendly (1 hr)	Bury	0–1	Blackburn Rovers	Morecambe
13:00 BST		Report	Graham 6'	Stadium: Globe Arena

16 July 2016 Friendly (1 hr)	Morecambe	0–0	Blackburn Rovers	Morecambe
14:30 BST		Report		Stadium: Globe Arena

19 July 2016 Friendly	Rochdale	1–1	Blackburn Rovers	Rochdale
19:45 BST	McDermott 64'	Report	Graham 11'	Stadium: Spotland Stadium

23 July 2016 Friendly	Blackpool	1–1	Blackburn Rovers	Blackpool
15:00 BST	Vassell 19'	Report	Graham 44'	Stadium: Bloomfield Road; Attendance: 2,657 (1,503 Rovers)

26 July 2016 Friendly	Mansfield Town	CANCELLED	Blackburn Rovers	Mansfield
19:30 BST				Stadium: Field Mill

30 July 2016 Friendly	Blackburn Rovers	1–1	Girona	Blackburn
15:00 BST	Marshall 27'	Report	Kiko 29'	Stadium: Ewood Park; Attendance: 2,131

31 July 2016 Friendly	Notts County	1–0	Blackburn Rovers	Nottingham
15:00 BST	Campbell 27'	Report		Stadium: Meadow Lane; Attendance: 1,411 (135 Rovers)

== Championship Season ==
=== League table ===
Pos	Team	Pld	W	D	L	GF	GA	GD	Pts	Promotion, qualification or relegation
20	Burton Albion	46	13	13	20	49	63	−14	52	
21	Nottingham Forest	46	14	9	23	62	72	−10	51	
22	Blackburn Rovers (R)	46	12	15	19	53	65	−12	51	Relegation to EFL League One
23	Wigan Athletic (R)	46	10	12	24	40	57	−17	42	Relegation to EFL League One
24	Rotherham United (R)	46	5	8	33	40	98	−58	23	Relegation to EFL League One

Source: English Football League, Soccerway
Rules for classification: 1) Points; 2) Goal difference; 3) Number of goals scored; 4) Points in head-to-head matches; 5) Goal difference in head-to-head matches; 6) Goals scored in head-to-head matches; 7) Play-off.
(R) Relegated

=== Result by round ===
Round	1	2	3	4	5	6	7	8	9	10	11	12	13	14	15	16	17	18	19	20	21	22	23	24	25	26	27	28	29	30	31	32	33	34	35	36	37	38	39	40	41	42	43	44	45	46
Ground	H	A	A	H	H	A	A	H	A	H	A	H	H	A	H	A	H	A	H	A	H	H	A	A	H	A	H	H	H	A	A	A	H	H	H	A	A	H	A	A	H	A	H	A	H	A
Result	L	L	L	D	L	D	L	W	W	L	L	D	W	L	D	L	W	W	D	L	L	L	L	D	W	L	D	L	W	D	L	D	W	W	D	D	D	D	L	L	L	W	D	D	W	W
Position	23	24	24	24	24	24	24	23	20	22	22	23	21	22	23	23	22	20	21	21	22	22	22	22	22	22	23	23	22	22	23	23	22	20	20	22	21	22	22	22	22	22	22	22	22	22

Updated to match(es) played on 7 May 2017. Source: Statto.com
A = Away; H = Home; W = Win; D = Draw; L = Loss

=== Matches ===
Sat, 6 August 2016 1	Blackburn Rovers	1–4	Norwich City	Blackburn
15:00 BST	Bennett (yellow card) 16'; Stokes 67'; Greer (yellow card) 76'	Report	Jacob Murphy 12'; Hoolahan 17'; Jerome 25' (yellow card) 69'; Naismith 58'	Stadium: Ewood Park; Attendance: 12,641 (1,535 away); Referee: Tony Harrington

Sat, 13 August 2016 2	Wigan Athletic	3–0	Blackburn Rovers	Wigan
15:00 BST	Grigg 14'; Perkins (yellow card) 33'; Powell 33'; Gilbey (yellow card) 48'; Duffy O.G. 63'	Report	Lowe (yellow card) 33'; Duffy (yellow card) 35'; Greer (yellow card) 45'	Stadium: DW Stadium; Attendance: 12,216 (2,240 away); Referee: Graham Scott

Wed, 17 August 2016 3	Cardiff City	2–1	Blackburn Rovers	Cardiff
19:45 BST	Duffy 14', 20' (o.g.); Harris (yellow card) 66'	Report	Duffy (yellow card) 63' (yellow-red card) 90+5'; Akpan (yellow card) 71'; Graham 77'	Stadium: Cardiff City Stadium; Attendance: 14,041 (197 away); Referee: Andy Davies

Sat, 20 August 2016 4	Blackburn Rovers	2–2	Burton Albion	Blackburn
15:00 BST	Graham (yellow card) 15'; Conway 25'; Lowe (yellow card) 58'; Gallagher (yellow card) 61' (goal) 62'	Report	Irvine 43'; Mousinho (yellow card) 49'; Naylor 88'	Stadium: Ewood Park; Attendance: 10,356; Referee: Peter Bankes

Sat, 27 August 2016 5	Blackburn Rovers	0–1	Fulham	Blackburn
15:00 BST	Akpan (yellow card) 76'	Report	Parker (yellow card) 68'; Cairney 90+4'	Stadium: Ewood Park; Attendance: 10,464; Referee: Scott Duncan

Sat, 10 September 2016 6	Queens Park Rangers	1–1	Blackburn Rovers	London
15:00 BST	Shodipo (yellow card) 50'; Perch (yellow card) 61'; Chery 65'	Report	Williams (yellow card) 42'; Akpan (yellow card) 47'; Gallagher 73'; Lowe (yellow card) 74'	Stadium: Loftus Road; Attendance: 13,210 (598 away); Referee: Keith Stroud

Tue, 13 September 2016 7	Leeds United	2–1	Blackburn Rovers	Leeds
19:45 BST	Green (yellow card) 6'; Sacko (yellow card) 44'; Wood 65'; Ayling (yellow card) 80'; Bartley 86'	Report	Greer (yellow card) 26'; Emnes 77'; Lenihan (yellow card) 81'; Marshall (yellow card) 90+8'	Stadium: Elland Road; Attendance: 19,009 (327 away); Referee: James Adcock

Sat, 17 September 2016 8	Blackburn Rovers	4–2	Rotherham United	Blackburn
15:00 BST	Conway 22'; Emnes 29'; Evans (yellow card) 41'; Marshall 46'; Gallagher 90+2'	Report	Ward 12', 83'; Mattock (yellow card) 58'; Brown (yellow card) 66'; Adeyemi (yellow card) 70'; Kelly (yellow card) 90+1'	Stadium: Ewood Park; Attendance: 10,699 (Inc. 734 visiting supporters); Referee: Darren Bond

Sat, 24 September 2016 9	Derby County	1–2	Blackburn Rovers	Derby
15:00 BST	Vydra 69'; Christie (yellow card) 77'	Report	Lowe (yellow card) 29'; Evans (yellow card) 37'; Emnes 70'; Graham 73'	Stadium: The iPro Stadium; Attendance: 26,602 (523 away); Referee: Andy Madley

Tue, 27 September 2016 10	Blackburn Rovers	0–1	Sheffield Wednesday	Blackburn
19:45 BST		Report	Fletcher 22'	Stadium: Ewood Park; Attendance: 12,844; Referee: Simon Hooper

Sat, 1 October 2016 11	Birmingham City	1–0	Blackburn Rovers	Birmingham
15:00 BST	Shotton (yellow card) 45+1'; Gleeson 64'	Report	Lowe (yellow card) 21'; Lenihan (yellow card) 30'; Graham (yellow card) 51'; Marshall (yellow card) 68'; Guthrie (yellow card) 71'; Hoban (yellow card) 81'	Stadium: St Andrew's; Attendance: 16,781 (555 away); Referee: James Linington

Sat, 15 October 2016 12	Blackburn Rovers	0–0	Ipswich Town	Blackburn
15:00 BST	Gallagher (yellow card) 87'	Report		Stadium: Ewood Park; Attendance: 10,820; Referee: Geoff Eltringham

Tue, 18 October 2016 13	Blackburn Rovers	2–1	Nottingham Forest	Blackburn
19:45 BST	Gallagher 11', 44'; Lenihan (yellow card) 75'; Feeney (yellow card) 90+4'; Gallagher (yellow card) 90+6'	Report	Pereira (yellow card) 9' (yellow-red card) 90+5'; Perquis 90+3'; Mills (yellow card) 90+6'	Stadium: Ewood Park; Attendance: 10,462; Referee: Tim Robinson

Sat, 22 October 2016 14	Bristol City	1–0	Blackburn Rovers	Bristol
15:00 BST	Flint (yellow card) 17'; Paterson (yellow card) 20'; Wilbraham 88'	Report	Mulgrew (yellow card) 89'	Stadium: Ashton Gate Stadium; Attendance: 21,452 (556 away); Referee: Andrew Davies

Sat, 29 October 2016 15	Blackburn Rovers	1–1	Wolverhampton Wanderers	Blackburn
17:30 BST	Gallagher 13'; Marshall (yellow card) 58'; Guthrie (yellow card) 75'	Report	Batth (yellow card) 26'; João Teixeira (yellow card) 67'; Edwards 78'	Stadium: Ewood Park; Attendance: 10,652; Referee: Scott Duncan

Sat, 5 November 2016 16	Aston Villa	2–1	Blackburn Rovers	Birmingham
15:00 GMT	Baker (yellow card) 24'; Kodjia 58' (pen.), 70'; McCormack (yellow card) 62'	Report	Gallagher 54'; Guthrie (yellow card) 66'; Akpan (yellow card) 86'	Stadium: Villa Park; Attendance: 29,712 (900 away); Referee: Roger East

Sat, 19 November 2016 17	Blackburn Rovers	2–1	Brentford	Blackburn
15:00 GMT	Graham 15' (pen.), 20'; Conway (yellow card) 27'; Dean 38' (o.g.); Lowe (yellow card) 59'; Marshall (yellow card) 66'	Report	Hogan 1', 30'; Bjelland (yellow card) 18'; Yennaris (yellow card) 66'	Stadium: Ewood Park; Attendance: 10,506 (418 away); Referee: Chris Kavanagh

Sat, 26 November 2016 18	Newcastle United	0–1	Blackburn Rovers	Newcastle
15:00 GMT	Hayden (yellow card) 83'	Report	Conway (yellow card) 24'; Lowe (yellow card) 68'; Mulgrew 75'; Marshall (yellow card) 90+1'	Stadium: St James' Park; Attendance: 52,092 (1,411 away); Referee: David Coote

Sat, 3 December 2016 19	Blackburn Rovers	1–1	Huddersfield Town	Blackburn
15:00 GMT	Lowe (yellow card) 13'; Graham 15' (pen.), 20'; Nyambe (yellow card) 69'; Lenihan (yellow card) 90+2'	Report	Palmer 6'; Hefele (yellow card) 34'; Palmer (yellow card) 58'	Stadium: Ewood Park; Attendance: 12,034; Referee: Simon Hooper

10 December 2016 20	Preston North End	3–2	Blackburn Rovers	Preston
17:30 GMT	Johnson 18', 31' (pen.); Clarke (yellow card) 52'; Robinson 80'	Report	Graham (penalty missed) 22' 22', 70'; Lenihan (yellow card) 30'; Marshall (yellow card) 60'	Stadium: Deepdale Stadium; Attendance: 14,527 (2,539 away); Referee: Kevin Friend

13 December 2016 21	Blackburn Rovers	2–3	Brighton & Hove Albion	Blackburn
19:45 GMT	Greer (yellow card) 61' (yellow-red card) 74'; Gallagher 66', 90+4' (yellow card) 84'; Lowe (yellow card) 70'	Report	Skalák (yellow card) 13'; Duffy 16'; Norwood (yellow card) 43'; Stephens 61'; Dunk (yellow card) 66'; Murray 79'	Stadium: Ewood Park; Attendance: 9,976; Referee: Oliver Langford

17 December 2016 22	Blackburn Rovers	2–3	Reading	Blackburn
15:00 GMT	Graham 44'; Lowe (yellow card) 66'; Brown 73'	Report	Samuel 32'; McCleary (yellow card) 36'; Moore 60'; Evans 90+2'	Stadium: Ewood Park; Attendance: 10,982; Referee: Jeremy Simpson

26 December 2016 23	Barnsley	2–0	Blackburn Rovers	Barnsley
15:00 GMT	Winnall 14'; Morsy (yellow card) 83'; Watkins 90+3'	Report	Mulgrew (yellow card) 63'; Akpan (yellow card) 67'; Lenihan (red card) 86'	Stadium: Oakwell; Attendance: 14,192 (1,440 away); Referee: Andy Madley

31 December 2016 24	Huddersfield Town	1–1	Blackburn Rovers	Huddersfield
12:45 GMT	Whitehead (yellow card) 17'; Wells 90+3'	Report	Graham 81'	Stadium: The John Smith's Stadium; Attendance: 21,311 (1,072 away); Referee: Darren Bond

2 January 2017 25	Blackburn Rovers	1–0	Newcastle United	Blackburn
15:00 GMT	Lowe (yellow card) 17'; Mulgrew 74'	Report	Dummett (yellow card) 64'; Colback (yellow card) 73'	Stadium: Ewood Park; Attendance: 18,542; Referee: Stephen Woolmer

14 January 2017 26	Ipswich Town	3–2	Blackburn Rovers	Ipswich
15:00 GMT	Lawrence 38', 57', (yellow card) 42'; Berra 53'; Dozzell (yellow card) 65'	Report	Akpan 43'; Graham 74' (pen.)	Stadium: Portman Road Stadium; Attendance: 15,009 (295 away); Referee: James Linington

21 January 2017 27	Blackburn Rovers	1–1	Birmingham City	Blackburn
15:00 GMT	Graham 45+3'; Lenihan (yellow card) 49'	Report	Jutkiewicz 3' (pen.); Morrison (yellow card) 39'; Davis (yellow card) 53'; Gleeson (yellow card) 55'	Stadium: Ewood Park; Attendance: 12,035; Referee: Steve Martin

1 February 2017 28	Blackburn Rovers	1–2	Leeds United	Blackburn
19:45 GMT	Bennett 83'	Report	Dallas 74'; Jansson (yellow card) 35' (goal) 89'	Stadium: Ewood Park; Attendance: 17,026 (6,402 away); Referee: Geoff Eltringham

4 February 2017 29	Blackburn Rovers	1–0	Queens Park Rangers	Blackburn
15:00 GMT	Gallagher 90+1'	Report	Perch (yellow card) 59'; Manning (yellow card) 80'; Furlong (yellow card) 90+1'	Stadium: Ewood Park; Attendance: 10,846; Referee: Tony Harrington

11 February 2017 30	Rotherham United	1–1	Blackburn Rovers	Rotherham
15:00 GMT	Kelly (yellow card) 44'; Taylor 47'	Report	Kelly 86' (o.g.); Mahoney (yellow card) 88'	Stadium: Aesseal New York Stadium; Attendance: 9,438 (1,195 away); Referee: Oliver Langford

14 February 2017 31	Sheffield Wednesday	2–1	Blackburn Rovers	Sheffield
19:45 GMT	Sasso 18', 44'; Hutchinson (yellow card) 33'; Bannan (yellow card) 45+3'; Reach (yellow card) 89'	Report	Hutchinson 20' (o.g.); Akpan (red card) 86'; Bennett (yellow card) 90+1'	Stadium: Hillsborough; Attendance: 24,603 (373 away); Referee: Scott Duncan

24 February 2017 32*	Burton Albion	1–1	Blackburn Rovers	Burton-upon-Trent
19:45 GMT	Sordell 54'; Turner (yellow card) 56'; McFadzean (yellow card) 87'	Report	Palmer 31' (o.g.)	Stadium: Pirelli Stadium; Attendance: 5,496 (1,579 away); Referee: James Linington

28 February 2017 33	Blackburn Rovers	1–0	Derby County	Blackburn
19:45 GMT	Conway 58' (pen.)	Report		Stadium: Ewood Park; Attendance: 10,536; Referee: Darren Bond

4 March 2017 34	Blackburn Rovers	1–0	Wigan Athletic	Blackburn
15:00 GMT	Emnes 59'	Report		Stadium: Ewood Park; Attendance: 13,165; Referee: Jeremy Simpson

7 March 2017 35	Blackburn Rovers	1–1	Cardiff City	Blackburn
19:45 GMT	Williams 90'	Report	Zohore 38'; Harris (yellow card) 45+1'; Bennett (yellow card) 90+2'	Stadium: Ewood Park; Attendance: 10,645; Referee: David Coote

11 March 2017 36	Norwich City	2–2	Blackburn Rovers	Norwich
15:00 GMT	Jerome 19', 81'; Dijks (red card) 21'; Hoolahan (yellow card) 43'; Whittaker (yellow card) 62'; Tettey (yellow card) 88'	Report	Lowe (yellow card) 56'; João 73', 78'; Lenihan (yellow card) 76'; Akpan (yellow card) 90+3'	Stadium: Carrow Road; Attendance: 26,224 (290 away); Referee: Simon Hooper

14 March 2017 37	Fulham	2–2	Blackburn Rovers	Craven Cottage, London
19:45 GMT	Aluko 45'; Fredericks (yellow card) 49'; McDonald (yellow card) 62'; Cyriac 86'	Report	Guthrie (yellow card) 40'; Lenihan (yellow card) 63'; Conway 79' (pen.); Emnes (yellow card) 83'; João 90+3' (yellow card) 90+4'	Attendance: 15,487 (537 away); Referee: Andrew Davies

18 March 2017 38	Blackburn Rovers	2–2	Preston North End	Ewood Park, Blackburn
13:00 GMT	Bennett 43'; Conway 56'; Mahoney (yellow card) 77'	Report	Barkhuizen 13'; Cunningham (yellow card) 67'; Huntington (yellow card) 87'; McGeady 90+3'	Attendance: 18,435 (6,005 away); Referee: Stuart Attwell

1 April 2017 39	Brighton & Hove Albion	1–0	Blackburn Rovers	Brighton
15:00 BST	Murray 67' (yellow card) 88'	Report	Gallagher (yellow card) 81'	Stadium: Falmer Stadium; Attendance: 30,216 (689 away); Referee: Tony Harrington

4 April 2017 40	Reading	3–1	Blackburn Rovers	Reading
20:00 BST	Kermorgant 14', 29'; Blackett (yellow card) 47'; McCleary 78'	Report	Bennett 77'	Stadium: Madejski Stadium; Attendance: 15,353 (480 away); Referee: James Adcock

8 April 2017 41	Blackburn Rovers	0–2	Barnsley	Blackburn
15:00 BST	Bennett (yellow card) 45+1'; Hoban (yellow card) 67'	Report	Roberts 3'; Watkins 10' (yellow card) 68'	Stadium: Ewood Park; Attendance: 12,347; Referee: Oliver Langford

14 April 2017 42	Nottingham Forest	0–1	Blackburn Rovers	Nottingham
15:00 BST	Traoré (yellow card) 11'; Osborn (yellow card) 77'; Cohen (yellow card) 90+2'	Report	Ward (yellow card) 53'; Williams (yellow card) 65'; Bennett (yellow card) 74'; Hoban 78'; João (yellow card) 90+3'	Stadium: City Ground; Attendance: 26,279 (1,638 away); Referee: Roger East

17 April 2017 43	Blackburn Rovers	1–1	Bristol City	Blackburn
15:00 BST	Bennett (yellow card) 22'; Williams (yellow card) 54'; Gallagher 71'	Report	Abraham 14'; Wright (yellow card) 49'; Bryan (yellow card) 81'; Cotterill (yellow card) 86'	Stadium: Ewood Park; Attendance: 13,935; Referee: Mike Jones

22 April 2017 44	Wolverhampton Wanderers	0–0	Blackburn Rovers	Wolverhampton
15:00 BST	Saïss (yellow card) 71'	Report	Lenihan (yellow card) 51'; Guthrie (yellow card) 64'; Lowe (yellow card) 70'	Stadium: Molineux Stadium; Attendance: 20,249 (1,258 away); Referee: David Coote

29 April 2017 45	Blackburn Rovers	1–0	Aston Villa	Blackburn
15:00 BST	Graham 54'	Report		Stadium: Ewood Park; Attendance: 21,884 (6,385 away); Referee: Geoff Eltringham

7 May 2017 46	Brentford	1–3	Blackburn Rovers	Brentford, London
12:00 BST	Vibe 56'; Dean (yellow card) 78' (yellow-red card) 83'	Report	Mulgrew 10'; Guthrie 16'; Conway (yellow card) 78' (goal) 83' (pen.)	Stadium: Griffin Park; Attendance: 11,969 (1,600 away); Referee: Tony Harrington

== EFL Cup ==
The first round draw of EFL Cup took place on Wednesday 22 June, Rovers were drawn away to League Two side Mansfield Town.

Tue, 9 August 2016 1	Mansfield Town	1–3	Blackburn Rovers	Mansfield
19:45 BST	Rose 48'	Report	Stokes 29', 55'; Duffy 54'; Byrne (yellow card) 72'	Stadium: Field Mill; Attendance: 2,885 (including 566 Rovers supporters); Referee: Stephen Martin

Tue, 23 August 2016 2	Blackburn Rovers	4–3 (a.e.t.)	Crewe Alexandra	Blackburn
19:45 BST	Akpan 42'; Wharton 69'; Conway 88'; Guthrie (yellow card) 90+2'; Duffy 97'; Gallagher (yellow card) 103'	Report	Bingham 8'; Dagnall 39', 90+3'	Stadium: Ewood Park; Attendance: 3,448 (Inc. 535 visiting supporters); Referee: Geoff Eltringham

Tue, 20 September 2016 3	Leeds United	1–0	Blackburn Rovers	Leeds
19:45 BST	Phillips (yellow card) 29'; Wood 85'	Report	Akpan (yellow card) 11'; Lenihan (yellow card) 79'; Emnes (yellow card) 90'	Stadium: Elland Road; Attendance: 8,488; Referee: Darren Deadman

== FA Cup ==
The first round draw of FA Cup took place on 12 December, Rovers were drawn away to Championship side Queens Park Rangers F.C.

Sat, 7 January 2017 Third round	Queens Park Rangers	1–2	Blackburn Rovers	London
15:00 BST	Bidwell (pen.), 61'	Report	Lynch 8' (o.g.); Feeney 58'; Marshall (yellow card) 90'	Stadium: Loftus Road; Attendance: 7,482; Referee: Simon Hooper

Sat, 28 January 2017 Fourth round	Blackburn Rovers	2–0	Blackpool	Blackburn
15:00 GMT	Gallagher 9'; Bennett 22'	Report	McAlister (yellow card) 59'; Mellor (yellow card) 61' (yellow-red card) 65'	Stadium: Ewood Park; Attendance: 9,237; Referee: Peter Bankes

Sun, 19 February 2017 Fifth round	Blackburn Rovers	1–2	Manchester United	Blackburn
16:15 GMT	Graham 17'; Williams (yellow card) 35'	Report	Rashford 27'; Lingard (yellow card) 52'; Young (yellow card) 73'; Ibrahimović 75'	Stadium: Ewood Park; Attendance: 23,130; Referee: Martin Atkinson

== EFL Trophy ==
Blackburn Development Squad entered the competition at the first round group stage and were drawn against Carlisle United, Fleetwood Town and Oldham Athletic in Northern Group D.

Pos	Div	Team	Pld	W	PW	PL	L	GF	GA	GD	Pts	Qualification
1	L2	Carlisle United	3	3	0	0	0	11	6	+5	9	Advance to Round 2
2	L1	Oldham Athletic	3	1	1	0	1	8	7	+1	5	Advance to Round 2
3	L1	Fleetwood Town	3	1	0	0	2	3	6	−3	3	
4	ACA	Blackburn Rovers U21	3	0	0	1	2	2	5	−3	1	

Source: Sky Sports

30 August 2016 Group Stage Game 1	Fleetwood Town	1–0	Blackburn Rovers U-23	Fleetwood
19:45 BST		Report	Cole 45+2'	Stadium: Highbury Stadium; Attendance: 392

4 October 2016 Group Stage Game 2	Carlisle United	2-0	Blackburn Rovers U-23	Carlisle
19:45 BST	Miller 39'; Grainger 88'	Report		Stadium: Brunton Park; Attendance: 1,253

8 November 2016 Group Stage Game 3	Blackburn Rovers U-23	2-2 (4-5 pens)	Oldham Athletic	Blackburn
19:30 GMT	Stokes 22'; Feeney 61'	Report	Ladapo 49'; Wilson 67'	Stadium: Ewood Park; Attendance: 471; Referee: Rob Jones

== Backroom staff ==
Position	Staff
Head Coach	(England) Tony Mowbray
Assistant Manager	(England) David Lowe
First Team Coach	(England) David Dunn
Acting Goalkeepers' Coach	(England) Ben Benson
Head of Academy	(England) Eric Kinder
Under-23 Lead Coach	(Northern Ireland) Damien Johnson
Under-23 Coach	(England) Wes Brown

Last updated: April 2017

== Squad statistics ==
=== Appearances and goals ===
As of 7 May 2017

No.	Pos	Nat	Player	Total		Championship		FA Cup		EFL Cup		EFL Trophy	
No.	Pos	Nat	Player	Apps	Goals	Apps	Goals	Apps	Goals	Apps	Goals	Apps	Goals
1	GK	(England) ENG	Jason Steele	44	0	41+0	0	2+0	0	1+0	0	0+0	0
33	GK	(Spain) ESP	David Raya	11	0	5+0	0	1+0	0	2+0	0	3+0	0
37	GK	(England) ENG	Andy Fisher	0	0	0+0	0	0+0	0	0+0	0	0+0	0
2	DF	(Wales) WAL	Adam Henley	3	0	2+0	0	0+0	0	0+1	0	0+0	0
3	DF	(Scotland) SCO	Gordon Greer	25	0	19+2	0	3+0	0	1+0	0	0+0	0
4	DF	(Republic of Ireland) IRL	Tommie Hoban (on loan from Watford)	16	1	15+1	1	0+0	0	0+0	0	0+0	0
5	DF	(Republic of Ireland) IRL	Derrick Williams	42	1	39+0	1	3+0	0	0+0	0	0+0	0
14	DF	(Scotland) SCO	Charlie Mulgrew	30	3	26+2	3	2+0	0	0+0	0	0+0	0
15	DF	(England) ENG	Elliott Ward	6	0	6+0	0	0+0	0	0+0	0	0+0	0
20	DF	(Scotland) SCO	Stephen Hendrie (on loan from West Ham United)	8	0	2+2	0	0+0	0	3+0	0	1+0	0
24	DF	(Namibia) NAM	Ryan Nyambe	31	0	22+3	0	1+1	0	0+1	0	3+0	0
26	DF	(Republic of Ireland) IRL	Darragh Lenihan	44	0	32+8	0	2+0	0	2+0	0	0+0	0
30	DF	(England) ENG	Wes Brown	8	1	3+2	1	0+1	0	0+0	0	2+0	0
36	DF	(England) ENG	Jack Doyle	3	0	0+0	0	0+0	0	0+0	0	2+1	0
41	DF	(England) ENG	Josh Askew	0	0	0+0	0	0+0	0	0+0	0	0+0	0
42	DF	(England) ENG	Lewis Travis	0	0	0+0	0	0+0	0	0+0	0	0+0	0
45	DF	(England) ENG	Matthew Platt	1	0	0+0	0	0+0	0	0+0	0	1+0	0
50	DF	(England) ENG	Tyler Magloire	0	0	0+0	0	0+0	0	0+0	0	0+0	0
6	MF	(England) ENG	Jason Lowe ^{(C)}	49	0	43+0	0	3+0	0	3+0	0	0+0	0
7	MF	(England) ENG	Liam Feeney	40	2	21+13	0	2+0	1	2+1	0	1+0	1
21	MF	(Nigeria) NGR	Hope Akpan	29	2	16+9	1	2+0	0	2+0	1	0+0	0
23	MF	(England) ENG	Danny Guthrie	27	1	22+2	1	1+1	0	0+1	0	0+0	0
27	MF	(England) ENG	Willem Tomlinson	5	0	0+1	0	0+1	0	0+0	0	3+0	0
28	MF	(England) ENG	Connor Mahoney	21	0	4+10	0	0+2	0	0+2	0	3+0	0
29	MF	(Northern Ireland) NIR	Corry Evans	19	0	16+3	0	0+0	0	0+0	0	0+0	0
31	MF	(Jamaica) JAM	Elliott Bennett	29	4	18+7	3	2+0	1	1+0	0	1+0	0
32	MF	(Scotland) SCO	Craig Conway	46	7	34+8	6	2+0	0	2+0	1	0+0	0
40	MF	(England) ENG	Connor Thomson	1	0	0+0	0	0+0	0	0+0	0	1+0	0
46	MF	(England) ENG	Lewis Hardcastle	3	0	0+0	0	0+0	0	0+0	0	3+0	0
48	MF	(England) ENG	Joe Grayson	0	0	0+0	0	0+0	0	0+0	0	0+0	0
49	MF	(England) ENG	Joe Rankin-Costello	1	0	0+0	0	0+0	0	0+0	0	1+0	0
9	FW	(Republic of Ireland) IRL	Anthony Stokes	14	4	2+6	1	0+2	0	2+0	2	2+0	1
12	FW	(England) ENG	Danny Graham	40	13	28+7	12	3+0	1	1+1	0	0+0	0
17	FW	(Netherlands) NED	Marvin Emnes (on loan from Swansea City)	37	4	22+13	4	1+0	0	0+1	0	0+0	0
18	FW	(Portugal) POR	Lucas João (on loan from Sheffield Wednesday)	13	3	3+10	3	0+0	0	0+0	0	0+0	0
19	FW	(England) ENG	Sam Gallagher (on loan from Southampton)	47	12	35+8	11	2+0	1	2+0	0	0+0	0
43	FW	(England) ENG	Ramirez Howarth	0	0	0+0	0	0+0	0	0+0	0	0+0	0
47	FW	(England) ENG	Lewis Mansell	2	0	0+0	0	0+0	0	0+0	0	2+0	0
Players out on loan:
34	DF	(England) ENG	Scott Wharton (on loan at Cambridge United)	7	1	1+1	0	0+0	0	2+0	1	3+0	0
Players that played for Blackburn Rovers this season that have left the club:
22	DF	(Republic of Ireland) IRL	Shane Duffy	5	2	3+0	0	0+0	0	2+0	2	0+0	0
11	MF	(Norway) NOR	Martin Samuelsen (on loan from West Ham United)	4	0	1+2	0	0+0	0	1+0	0	0+0	0
8	MF	(Republic of Ireland) IRL	Jack Byrne (on loan from Manchester City)	7	0	3+1	0	0+0	0	3+0	0	0+0	0
10	MF	(England) ENG	Ben Marshall	25	1	22+0	1	1+0	0	1+1	0	0+0	0

=== Goalscorers ===
As of 3 May 2017

Rank	No.	Pos.	Name	League	FA Cup	EFL Cup	Total
1	12	FW	(England) Danny Graham	12	1	0	13
2	19	FW	(England) Sam Gallagher	10	1	0	11
3	32	MF	(Scotland) Craig Conway	6	0	1	7
4	17	FW	(Netherlands) Marvin Emnes	4	0	0	4
=	31	MF	(Jamaica) Elliott Bennett	3	1	0	4
6	9	FW	(Republic of Ireland) Anthony Stokes	1	0	2	3
=	18	FW	(Portugal) Lucas João	3	0	0	3
=	14	DF	(Scotland) Charlie Mulgrew	3	0	0	3
9	22	DF	(Republic of Ireland) Shane Duffy*	0	0	2	2
=	21	MF	(Nigeria) Hope Akpan	1	0	1	2
11	34	DF	(England) Scott Wharton	0	0	1	1
=	10	MF	(England) Ben Marshall*	1	0	0	1
=	30	DF	(England) Wes Brown	1	0	0	1
=	7	MF	(England) Liam Feeney	0	1	0	1
=	5	DF	(Republic of Ireland) Derrick Williams	1	0	0	1
=	23	MF	(England) Danny Guthrie	1	0	0	1
—	—	—	Own goal	4	1	0	5
Total				51	5	7	63

=== Disciplinary record ===
As of 7 May 2017

No.	Pos.	Name	Championship			FA Cup			EFL Cup			Total		
No.	Pos.	Name	Yellow card	(yellow card) (red card)	Red card	Yellow card	(yellow card) (red card)	Red card	Yellow card	(yellow card) (red card)	Red card	Yellow card	(yellow card) (red card)	Red card
31	MF	(Jamaica) Elliott Bennett	4	0	0	0	0	0	0	0	0	4	0	0
3	DF	(Scotland) Gordon Greer	4	1	0	0	0	0	0	0	0	4	1	0
8	MF	(Republic of Ireland) Jack Byrne *	0	0	0	0	0	0	1	0	0	1	0	0
6	DF	(England) Jason Lowe	13	0	0	0	0	0	0	0	0	13	0	0
10	MF	(England) Ben Marshall*	6	0	0	1	0	0	0	0	0	7	0	0
29	MF	(Northern Ireland) Corry Evans	3	0	0	0	0	0	0	0	0	3	0	0
22	DF	(Republic of Ireland) Shane Duffy*	2	1	0	0	0	0	0	0	0	2	1	0
21	MF	(Nigeria) Hope Akpan	6	0	1	0	0	0	1	0	0	7	0	1
12	FW	(England) Danny Graham	2	0	0	0	0	0	0	0	0	2	0	0
19	FW	(England) Sam Gallagher	4	0	0	0	0	0	1	0	0	5	0	0
23	MF	(England) Danny Guthrie	6	0	0	0	0	0	1	0	0	7	0	0
5	DF	(Republic of Ireland) Derrick Williams	1	0	0	1	0	0	0	0	0	2	0	0
14	DF	(Netherlands) Marvin Emnes	1	0	0	0	0	0	1	0	0	2	0	0
26	DF	(Republic of Ireland) Darragh Lenihan	9	0	1	0	0	0	1	0	0	10	0	1
4	DF	(Republic of Ireland) Tommie Hoban	2	0	0	0	0	0	0	0	0	2	0	0
7	MF	(England) Liam Feeney	1	0	0	0	0	0	0	0	0	1	0	0
14	DF	(Scotland) Charlie Mulgrew	3	0	0	0	0	0	0	0	0	3	0	0
32	MF	(Scotland) Craig Conway	3	0	0	0	0	0	0	0	0	3	0	0
24	DF	(Namibia) Ryan Nyambe	2	0	0	0	0	0	0	0	0	2	0	0
28	MF	(England) Connor Mahoney	2	0	0	0	0	0	0	0	0	2	0	0
1	GK	(England) Jason Steele	1	0	0	0	0	0	0	0	0	1	0	0
18	FW	(Portugal) Lucas João	1	0	0	0	0	0	0	0	0	1	0	0
Total			71	2	2	2	0	0	6	0	0	79	2	2

== Transfers and loans ==
=== Summer ===
==== Transfers in ====
Date from	Position	Nationality	Name	From	Fee	Ref.
1 July 2016	CF	ENG	Danny Graham	Sunderland	Free transfer	
1 July 2016	CF	IRL	Anthony Stokes	Celtic	Free transfer	
1 July 2016	RW	ENG	Liam Feeney	Bolton Wanderers	Free transfer	
2 August 2016	CB	SCO	Gordon Greer	Brighton & Hove Albion	Free transfer	
26 August 2016	CB	IRL	Derrick Williams	Bristol City	Undisclosed (~£250,000)	
31 August 2016	CB	SCO	Charlie Mulgrew	Celtic	Free transfer	
21 September 2016	CB	ENG	Wes Brown	Sunderland	Free transfer	

Total outgoing: ▼ ~£250,000

==== Loans in ====
Date from	Position	Nationality	Name	From	Length	Ref.
1 July 2016	LB	SCO	Stephen Hendrie	West Ham United	Season-long	
1 July 2016	CM	IRL	Jack Byrne	Manchester City	6 January 2017 (Note: On 6 January 2017, Blackburn terminated the loan of Jack Byrne.)	
11 August 2016	CF	ENG	Sam Gallagher	Southampton	Season-long	
25 August 2016	AM	NOR	Martin Samuelsen	West Ham United	22 November 2016 (Note: On 22 November 2016, Blackburn terminated the loan of Martin Samuelsen.)	
26 August 2016	CB	IRL	Tommie Hoban	Watford	Season-long	
31 August 2016	FW	NED	Marvin Emnes	Swansea City	4 Month loan (17 January 2017)	

==== Transfers out ====
Date from	Position	Nationality	Name	To	Fee	Ref.
1 July 2016	CF	ENG	Chris Brown	Bury (Note: Following Brown's release, he signed for Bury.)	Released	
1 July 2016	CF	ENG	Stuart Callaway	Free agent	Released	
1 July 2016	CM	ENG	David Carson	South Shields (Note: Following Carson's release, he signed for South Shields.)	Released	
1 July 2016	LW	ENG	Modou Cham	Clitheroe (Note: Following Cham's release, he signed for Clitheroe.)	Released	
1 July 2016	GK	SCO	Ryan Crump	Southport (Note: Following Crump's release, he signed for Southport.)	Released	
1 July 2016	CF	ENG	Nathan Delfouneso	Swindon Town (Note: Following Delfouneso's release, he signed for Swindon Town.)	Released	
1 July 2016	GK	ENG	Simon Eastwood	Oxford United (Note: Following Eastwood's release, he signed for Oxford United.)	Released	
1 July 2016	CF	ENG	Anton Forrester	Port Vale (Note: Following Forrester's release, he signed for Port Vale.)	Released	
1 July 2016	CF	ENG	Devarn Green	Free agent	Released	
1 July 2016	CF	CAN	Simeon Jackson	Walsall (Note: Following Jackson's release, he signed for Walsall.)	Released	
1 July 2016	CF	ENG	Sam Joel	Free agent	Released	
1 July 2016	CB	ENG	Matthew Kilgallon	Bradford City (Note: Following Kilgallon's release, he signed for Bradford City.)	Released	
1 July 2016	CB	SCO	Sam Lavelle	Bolton Wanderers (Note: Lavelle signs for Bolton Wanderers.)	Released	
1 July 2016	RB	ESP	Jan Pirretas	Bayer Leverkusen (Note: Following Pirretas' release, he signed for Bayer Leverkusen.)	Released	
1 July 2016	CF	SCO	Jordan Preston	Guiseley (Note: Following Preston's release, he signed for Guiseley.)	Released	
1 July 2016	LB	ENG	Tommy Spurr	Preston North End (Note: Following Spurr's release, he signed for Preston North End.)	Released	
1 July 2016	CM	AUS	Hyuga Tanner	Bolton Wanderers	Released	
1 July 2016	LM	ENG	Chris Taylor	Bolton Wanderers (Note: Following Taylor's release, he signed for Bolton Wanderers.)	Released	
1 July 2016	LW	ENG	Luke Wall	Accrington Stanley (Note: Following Wall's release, he signed for Accrington Stanley.)	Released	
1 July 2016	CM	JAM	Lee Williamson	Burton Albion (Note: Following Williamson's release, he signed for Burton Albion.)	Released	
21 July 2016	CB	SCO	Grant Hanley	Newcastle United	Undisclosed (~£5,500,000 + add-ons worth £500,000)	
26 August 2016	CB	IRL	Shane Duffy	Brighton & Hove Albion	Undisclosed (~£4,200,000)	

Total incoming: ▲ ~£10,467,500-£10,917,500

- Subtracts estimated 10% sell on fee (£550,000-£600,000) due to Crewe in Grant Hanley's £5,500,000-£6,000,000 sale to Newcastle United.
- Includes estimated 15% sell on fee (£1,250,000) following Ruben Rochina's transfer from Granada to Rubin Kazan on 20 July 2016 for €10,000,000.
- Includes estimated 25% sell on fee (~£67,500) following Jack O'Connell's transfer from Brentford to Sheffield United on 10 July 2016 (assumed here to be £250,000, though the fee was undisclosed).

==== Loans out ====
Date from	Position	Nationality	Name	To	Length	Ref.
8 August 2016	CM	IRL	John O'Sullivan	Accrington Stanley	6-month loan (7 January)	

=== Winter ===
==== Transfers in ====
Date from	Position	Nationality	Name	From	Fee	Ref.

Total outgoing: ~£0 £0+/-

==== Loans in ====
Date from	Position	Nationality	Name	From	Length	Ref.
30 January 2017	FW	POR	Lucas João	Sheffield Wednesday	End of Season	
31 January 2017	FW	NED	Marvin Emnes	Swansea City	End of Season	

==== Transfers out ====
Date from	Position	Nationality	Name	To	Fee	Ref.
17 January 2017	AM	IRL	John O'Sullivan	Carlisle United (Note: Following O'Sullivan's release, he signed for Carlisle United.)	Mutual Consent	
31 January 2017	FW	ENG	Dean Rittenberg	Bangor City (Note: Following Rittenberg's release, he signed for Bangor City.)	Mutual Consent	
31 January 2017	MF	ENG	Ben Marshall	Wolverhampton Wanderers	Undisclosed (~£1,500,000)	

Total incoming: ▲ ~£1,650,000

- Includes estimated 15% profit sell on fee (£150,000) following Martin Olsson's transfer from Norwich City to Swansea City on 17 January 2017 for an undisclosed fee that is estimated to be £4,000,000, having originally been sold to Norwich City for £3,000,000.

==== Loans out ====
Date from	Position	Nationality	Name	To	Length	Ref.
20 January 2017	CB	ENG	Scott Wharton	Cambridge United	End of Season	
