= Jason Lowe (footballer) =

English footballer (born 1991)

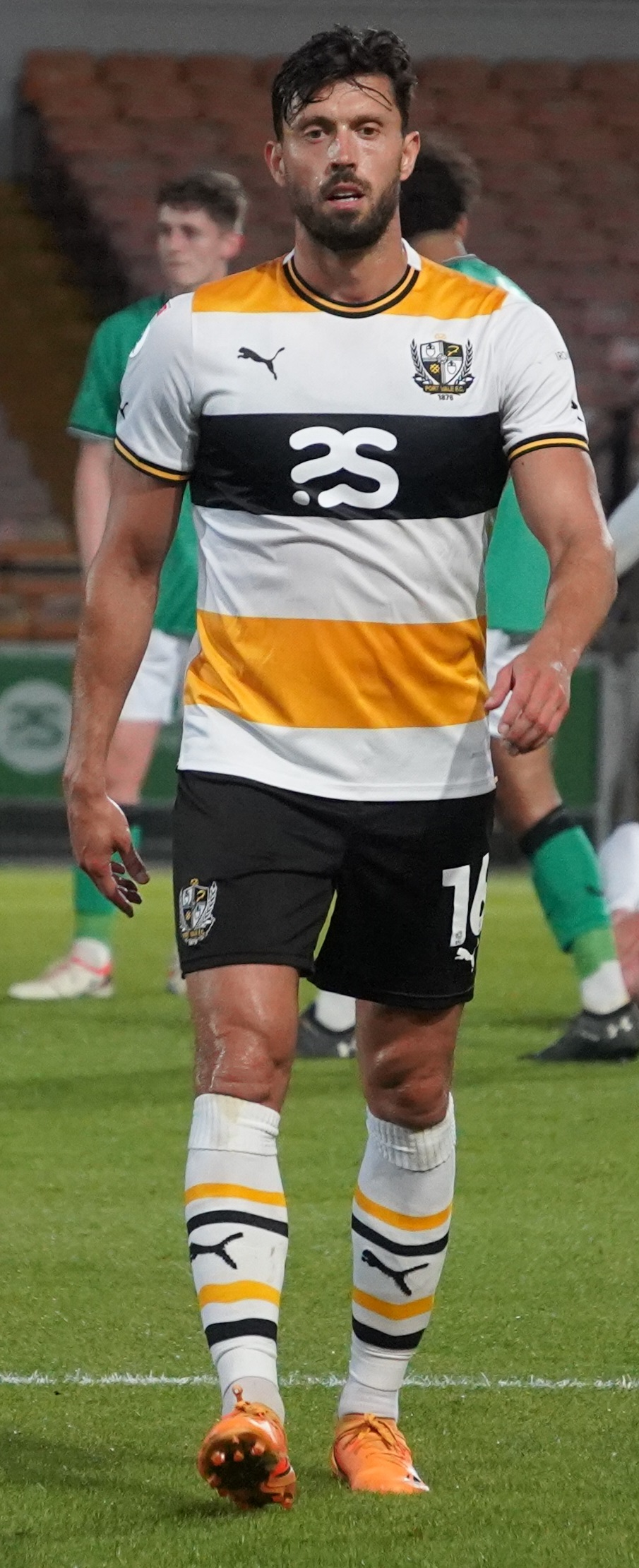
- Lowe with Port Vale in 2023

Personal information
- Full name: Jason John Lowe
- Date of birth: 2 September 1991 (age 35)
- Place of birth: Wigan, England
- Height: 6 ft 0 in (1.83 m)
- Positions: Defensive midfielder; right-back

Youth career
- 2003–2009: Blackburn Rovers

Senior career*
Years	Team	Apps	(Gls)
2009–2017	Blackburn Rovers	173	(1)
2011	→ Oldham Athletic (loan)	7	(2)
2017–2018	Birmingham City	9	(0)
2018–2020	Bolton Wanderers	64	(0)
2020–2023	Salford City	116	(2)
2023–2025	Port Vale	40	(0)
2025–2026	Tranmere Rovers	16	(0)

International career
2011	England U20	5	(0)
2011–2013	England U21	11	(0)
- * Club domestic league appearances and goals as of 00:28, 5 May 2026 (UTC)

Jason John Lowe (born 2 September 1991) is an English professional footballer who plays as a midfielder or right-back.

Lowe came through the youth system at Blackburn Rovers to turn professional in September 2009 and make his senior debut in January 2011. He then spent a short time on loan at Oldham Athletic. He also made his international debut for the England under-20 team in 2011, captained his country at the 2011 FIFA U-20 World Cup, and made his under-21 debut that same year. He became a regular in the Blackburn first-team from the 2011–12 season, when the club were relegated from the Premier League. He spent five seasons with the club in the Championship, though he was hampered by injuries in the 2014–15 and 2015–16 campaigns. He played 196 games for the club in all competitions.

He signed with Birmingham City in August 2017. He struggled for game-time and moved on to Bolton Wanderers in June 2018, who went on to be relegated into League One at the end of the 2018–19 campaign. He was released after serving as club captain for much of the 2019–20 season as Bolton suffered a second successive relegation. He joined League Two club Salford City in July 2020 and scored the winning penalty kick in the 2020 EFL Trophy final. He spent three seasons with Salford before returning to League One with Port Vale in July 2023. Vale were relegated, though he was promoted out of League Two with the club at the end of the 2024–25 season. He joined Tranmere Rovers for the 2025–26 campaign.

== Early life ==
Jason John Lowe was born on 2 September 1991 in Wigan, Greater Manchester and raised in nearby Leigh. He attended St. Thomas C.E. Primary School in Leigh.

== Club career ==
=== Blackburn Rovers ===
Lowe joined Blackburn Rovers' Academy as an under-12 and had progressed to the reserve team when he signed his first professional contract on 4 September 2009. On 8 January 2011, he made his senior debut at Ewood Park in the 1–0 win over Queens Park Rangers in the first round of the FA Cup. A week later, he made his first appearance in the Premier League, as a 24th-minute substitute for the injured David Dunn in a 2–0 loss to Chelsea. Lowe was set to join Aberdeen on loan before the deal fell through due to injuries in the Blackburn first-team.

On 24 March, he joined Oldham Athletic of League One on loan until the end of the 2010–11 season, to gain experience of competitive first-team football. Lowe made his debut at Boundary Park four days later against Tranmere Rovers, and scored his first goal for the club with a penalty in the 2–0 win against Notts County on 3 April. He was singled out for praise by manager Paul Dickov after the match for volunteering to take the penalty despite being a young player at a new club. On 25 April, he "fired into the top corner late on" to help Oldham secure a 1–1 draw with Walsall on 25 April. He finished his loan spell with two goals from seven appearances.

Lowe's next appearance for Blackburn came in the League Cup second-round win against Sheffield Wednesday on 24 August 2011. He made his first league appearance of the season, as a substitute for Rubén Rochina against Fulham on 11 September, and his first league start for Blackburn six days later against Arsenal. After producing what BBC Sport dubbed "a string of impressive displays", Lowe signed a five-year contract with Blackburn. He continued to be a first-team regular, playing in a variety of positions; according to manager Steve Kean, "he can play right-back, holding midfield player, wide right, doubling up with a full-back, he can play box-to-box as a genuine midfield player". He was twice suspended in the 2011–12 season, but still made 37 appearances in all competitions as Blackburn Rovers were relegated from the Premier League.

At the start of the 2012–13 season, manager Steve Kean spoke of Lowe as one of several players in contention for a place in defence. He started the opening Championship match, away to Ipswich Town, at left-back, and scored a late own goal to give the hosts a draw. The following week, he set up the opening goal for Nuno Gomes in a 2–1 win over Leicester City. He started regularly in midfield in October 2012 under caretaker manager Eric Black, but a hamstring injury then kept him out for a month. He was utilised at right-back by Michael Appleton in March after a series of injuries to the club's regular full-backs. Against a background of continued managerial changes, Lowe established himself in Blackburn's midfield, and finished the season with 42 appearances in all competitions.

In the 2013–14 season, Lowe continued as a regular in midfield, and in October he signed a contract extension to run until 2017. Manager Gary Bowyer said that if Lowe wanted to make himself into "that old-fashioned midfielder that can do a bit of everything", he needed to start scoring goals. Four days later, he obliged, with a "thunderous 25 yards (23 m) strike into the top corner" at home to Middlesbrough that earned him the club's Goal of the Season award. Speaking afterwards, he said "I don't think the phrase Jason Lowe and match-winner go together very often, so that's something that's nice to change. As soon as I hit it I knew it had a chance and when I saw it was on target and it flew in it was an unbelievable feeling. After Lowe's third consecutive man of the match performance, teammate and former England international David Dunn discussed his potential in glowing terms. He made his 100th appearance for the club on 3 December, in a 3–1 loss against Ipswich Town, and went on to make 42 appearances in all competitions over the season.

Ahead of the 2014–15 season, Lowe said he was targeting more goals, but Rovers' shortage of defenders through injury meant he reverted to the right-back position, and then injury intervened. A stress fracture in his foot kept him out for several months, and a week after his return to the side, he suffered a recurrence of the injury during a 2–0 win over Charlton Athletic on 20 December. He came back into the team fully fit a month later, producing what Bowyer dubbed a terrific performance against Wigan Athletic on 17 January 2015, but the injury recurred yet again in mid-February. Lowe underwent surgery that kept him out for the rest of the season. Four appearances into the 2015–16 season his foot let him down yet again. He had another operation. Having spent six months on the sidelines, Lowe returned to action with the reserve side to regain his match fitness. He returned to the first-team on 9 April in the starting eleven for a goalless draw away to Wolverhampton Wanderers, and started four of the remaining five matches.

After Grant Hanley left the club, Lowe was appointed captain for the 2016–17 season. The team struggled, and he himself had disciplinary issues: he received his tenth yellow card – his fifth in six appearances – on 17 December, so by the end of the year had missed three matches through suspension. As the season progressed, Rovers' form dipped and they settled in the relegation zone. In the penultimate match of the season, against Aston Villa, Lowe supplied the cross for Danny Graham's winning goal; the result left survival in their own hands. On the final day, Rovers won 3–1 at Brentford, but other results went against them and they were relegated to League One. Lowe was one of eight players released. In a farewell message, he thanked staff and supporters who had helped him "grow as a man and a player" over 13 years with the club and said that Blackburn Rovers would always have a special place in his heart. During his time at the club he was named the club's first Player Ambassador by Blackburn Rovers Community Trust.

=== Birmingham City ===
Lowe signed a one-year contract with Championship club Birmingham City on 31 August 2017. He was one of six debutants in the starting eleven for Birmingham's next fixture, away to Norwich City; he played 78 minutes and was yellow-carded in the first half as his team lost 1–0. After just two minutes of his home debut a week later at St Andrew's, Lowe injured a hamstring – the fifth such injury sustained by Birmingham players in the first few weeks of the season. Having been a last-minute squad addition by manager Harry Redknapp, he found himself frozen out under Redknapp's successor Steve Cotterill, and then only featured twice under Garry Monk. He was released by Birmingham at the end of the 2017–18 season.

=== Bolton Wanderers ===
After his release from Birmingham, Lowe became Championship club Bolton Wanderers' first signing of the 2018 summer transfer window when he signed a two-year deal on 8 June. He made his debut for Bolton on 4 August when starting Wanderers' 2–1 victory at West Bromwich Albion. He started 35 of the club's 46 Championship games in the 2018–19 campaign, picking up eleven yellow cards, as Bolton were relegated in 23rd-place.

The club faced the possibility of liquidation in summer 2019 and entered the new season in administration with a 12-point deduction; as one of a small number of experienced players left in the squad, Lowe was installed as club captain. This lasted until 17 September, when Liam Bridcutt became captain. Despite losing the captaincy under new manager Keith Hill, Lowe enjoyed an upturn in form as Bridcutt took on more defensive midfield duties to allow Lowe the freedom to roam forward and join the attack. Lowe started in the centre of midfield for every game he was available until being moved to right-back towards the end of December, with Phil Parkinson stating that "he's a good midfielder but he's a better right-back". On 29 December, he received the first sending off of his career for a lunging challenge on Ollie Norburn during a 1–1 draw with Shrewsbury Town at the University of Bolton Stadium. Lowe became captain again after Bridcutt left in January 2020. Lowe was one of 14 senior players released at the end of his contract following the club's relegation at the end of the 2019–20 season.

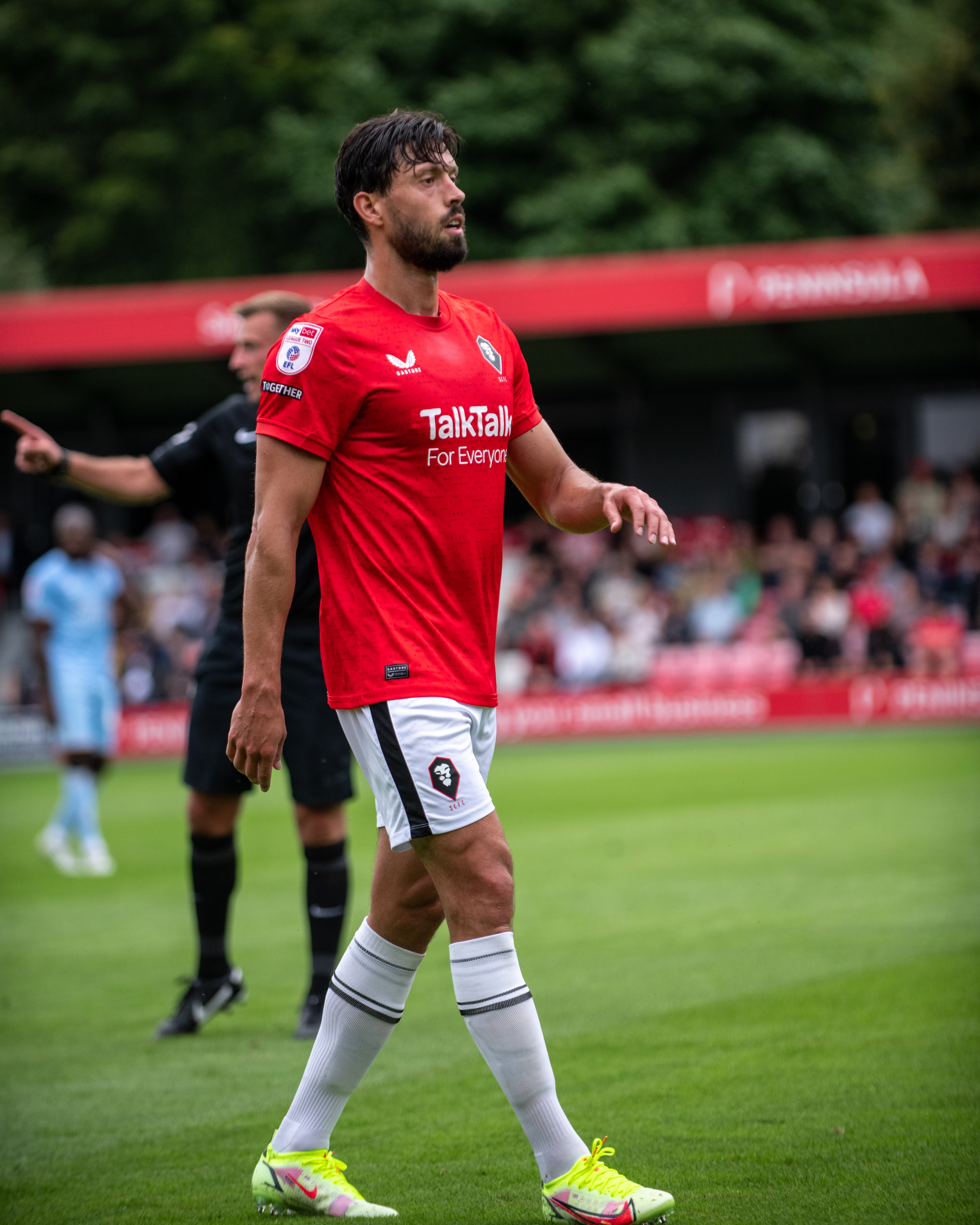
Lowe playing for Salford City in July 2022

=== Salford City ===
On 22 July 2020, Lowe joined League Two club Salford City on a three-year deal. Upon the deal being confirmed, manager Graham Alexander said that Lowe was a leader who would strengthen the spine of the team, whilst Lowe said that "they want promotion and it's as simple as that". He made his competitive debut on 5 September in the EFL Cup, in a 1–1 draw against Championship side Rotherham United; Salford won on penalties. On 13 March 2021, he started the 2020 EFL Trophy final at Wembley Stadium against League One side Portsmouth, which finished as a 0–0 draw; he scored the winning penalty in the shoot-out to secure Salford City their first honour in the English Football League. He missed just one league game of the 2020–21 campaign, as Salford missed out on the play-offs by two points.

He scored two goals in 48 appearances throughout the 2021–22 season, ending an eight-year goal drought. He was named PFA Community Player of the Year for the 2021–22 season, having patronised the Derian House children's hospice. He was released at the end of the 2022–23 season, having been limited to 28 appearances and missing the play-off semi-final defeat to Stockport County; he featured 125 times during his three years at Moor Lane.

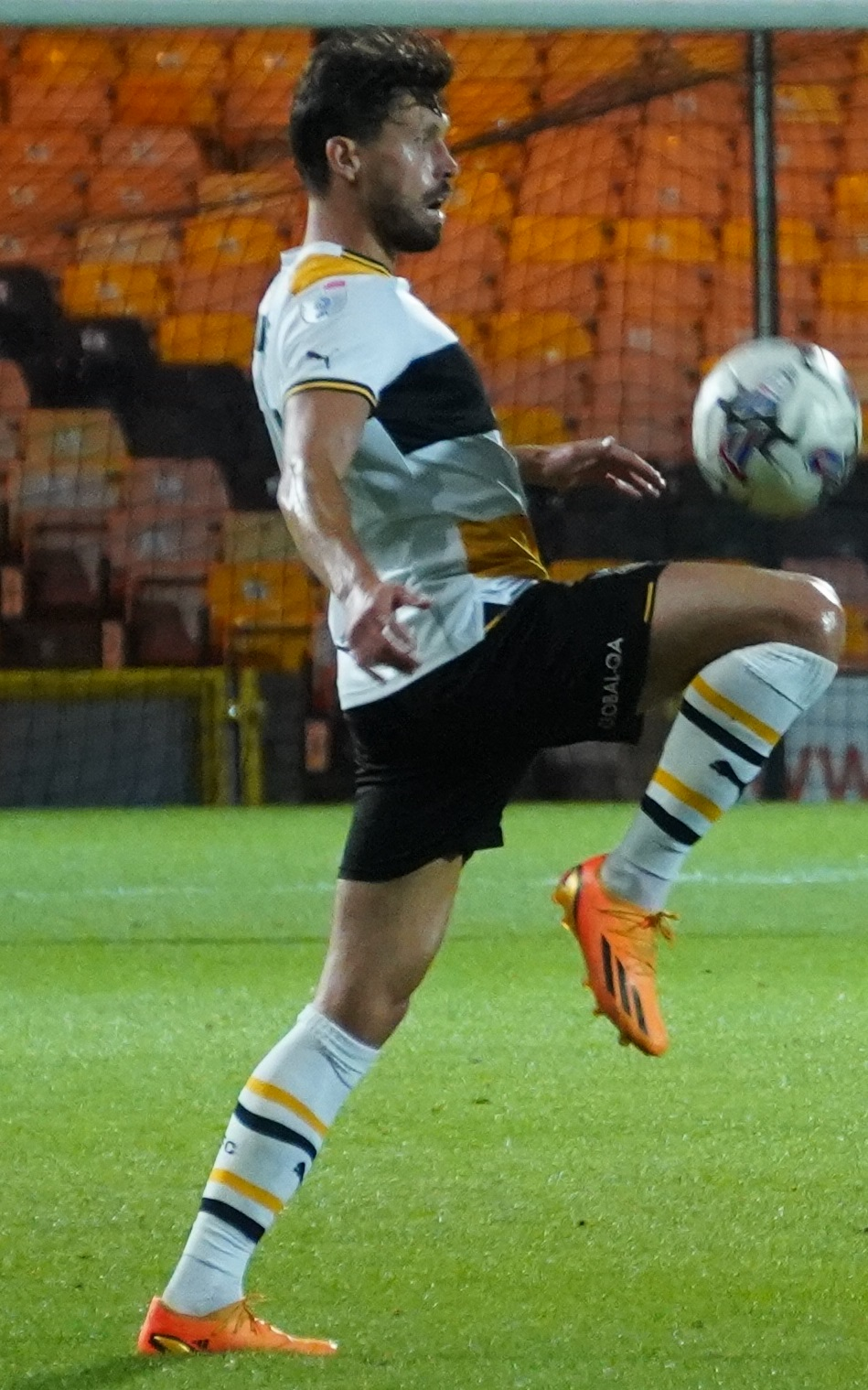
Lowe playing for Port Vale in October 2023

=== Port Vale ===
Lowe signed a two-year contract with League One club Port Vale on 3 July 2023. Manager Andy Crosby and director of football David Flitcroft both emphasised the player's experience and leadership capabilities. Lowe made his first start for the club on 7 October, playing on the right of a back three in a 2–0 defeat at Portsmouth. He failed to establish himself in any one position in the 2023–24 season as Vale were relegated from League One. He was released upon the expiry of his contract at the end of the 2024–25 promotion-winning season.

=== Tranmere Rovers ===
On 30 June 2025, Lowe agreed a one-year contract with League Two club Tranmere Rovers, who were managed by former Port Vale boss Andy Crosby. Crosby was sacked by March, and Lowe said the Rovers squad must "stick together" as they fought against relegation after interim manager Andy Parkinson handed him the captaincy. He played 19 games in the 2025–26 campaign, and was released in the summer once his contract expired.

== International career ==
Lowe was called into an England U19 training camp after impressing for Blackburn in the academy and reserves and was on stand-by for the U-19 team which travelled to Ukraine for the UEFA European Under-19 Championship Elite Qualifying Round. Lowe was selected for England U-19 for the UEFA European Under-19 Championship finals in July 2010, but eventually missed out due to injury.

Lowe made his debut for England U20 in a friendly against France on 9 February 2011. In July 2011, Lowe was included for the England U20 squad at the 2011 FIFA U-20 World Cup in Colombia, joining his teammate Josh Morris. Prior to the FIFA U-20 World Cup, Lowe made his only cap before he captained England U-20 at the FIFA U-20 World Cup in Colombia in the summer of 2011, where they were knocked out in the last 16.

Lowe was called up by England U21 and appeared as an unused substitute against Iceland U21 on 7 October 2011. Three days later, he made his debut for England U21 in a 2–1 win against Norway U21 in a 2013 Euro Under-21 qualifier. He made his two more appearances for England U21 later in November 2011 against Iceland U21 and Belgium U21. He continued to be recalled by England U21 for the Euro qualifier on several occasions and became a first-team regular in England's U21 squad until June 2013. In May 2013, Lowe was called up again for the UEFA European Under-21 Championship in Israel. Lowe played two matches, as England U21 were eliminated in the Group stage.

== Style of play ==
Lowe plays as a defensive midfielder or at right-back. Speaking in February 2017, Blackburn Rovers boss Owen Coyle praised his mentality and work rate, saying "he's a player that you know will give you everything you've got... sets a fantastic example... [and] covers every blade of grass".

== Career statistics ==
As of match played 14 March 2026

Appearances and goals by club, season and competition
Club	Season	League			FA Cup		League Cup		Other		Total	
Club	Season	Division	Apps	Goals	Apps	Goals	Apps	Goals	Apps	Goals	Apps	Goals
Blackburn Rovers	2010–11	Premier League	1	0	1	0	0	0	—		2	0
Blackburn Rovers	2011–12	Premier League	32	0	1	0	4	0	—		37	0
Blackburn Rovers	2012–13	Championship	36	0	5	0	1	0	—		42	0
Blackburn Rovers	2013–14	Championship	39	1	2	0	1	0	—		42	1
Blackburn Rovers	2014–15	Championship	12	0	1	0	1	0	—		14	0
Blackburn Rovers	2015–16	Championship	10	0	0	0	0	0	—		10	0
Blackburn Rovers	2016–17	Championship	43	0	3	0	3	0	—		49	0
Blackburn Rovers	Total		173	1	13	0	10	0	—		196	1
Oldham Athletic (loan)	2010–11	League One	7	2	—		—		—		7	2
Birmingham City	2017–18	Championship	9	0	2	0	—		—		11	0
Bolton Wanderers	2018–19	Championship	35	0	2	0	0	0	—		37	0
Bolton Wanderers	2019–20	League One	29	0	1	0	1	0	3 (Note: Appearance(s) in the EFL Trophy)	0	34	0
Bolton Wanderers	Total		64	0	3	0	1	0	3	0	71	0
Salford City	2020–21	League Two	45	0	1	0	2	0	1	0	49	0
Salford City	2021–22	League Two	45	2	2	0	1	0	0	0	48	2
Salford City	2022–23	League Two	26	0	0	0	1	0	1	0	28	0
Salford City	Total		116	2	3	0	4	0	2	0	125	2
Port Vale	2023–24	League One	29	0	3	0	4	0	2	0	38	0
Port Vale	2024–25	League Two	11	0	1	0	1	0	5	0	18	0
Port Vale	Total		40	0	4	0	5	0	7	0	56	0
Tranmere Rovers	2025–26	League Two	16	0	0	0	1	0	2	0	19	0
Career total			425	5	25	0	21	0	14	0	485	5

== Honours ==
Salford City

- EFL Trophy: 2019–20

Port Vale

- EFL League Two second-place promotion: 2024–25
