= Danny Guthrie =

English footballer

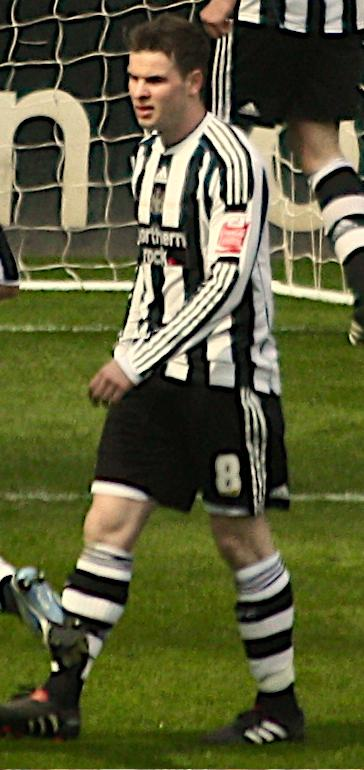
- Guthrie playing for Newcastle United in 2010

Personal information
- Full name: Danny Sean Guthrie
- Date of birth: 18 April 1987 (age 39)
- Place of birth: Shrewsbury, England
- Height: 5 ft 9 in (1.75 m)
- Position: Midfielder

Youth career
- 2000–2002: Manchester United
- 2002–2005: Liverpool

Senior career*
Years	Team	Apps	(Gls)
2005–2008	Liverpool	3	(0)
2007	→ Southampton (loan)	10	(0)
2007–2008	→ Bolton Wanderers (loan)	25	(0)
2008–2012	Newcastle United	92	(7)
2012–2015	Reading	62	(5)
2015	→ Fulham (loan)	6	(0)
2015–2017	Blackburn Rovers	40	(1)
2017–2018	Oakengates Athletic	?	(?)
2018	Mitra Kukar	29	(2)
2019–2021	Walsall	39	(1)
2021–2022	Fram	16	(0)
Total		322	(16)

International career
2002–2003	England U16	4	(0)
2003	England U17	4	(1)
- * Club domestic league appearances and goals

Danny Sean Guthrie (born 18 April 1987) is an English former professional footballer who played as a midfielder. He made more than 200 appearances in the Premier League and Football League and represented the England under-17s at international level in 2003.

== Early life ==
Born in Shrewsbury, Shropshire, Guthrie attended Thomas Telford School in Telford from the age of 11 until he was 16 while he was also a part of the Manchester United youth academy. He was a member of a very successful football squad at his school, winning many County Cups and reaching the semi-finals in the English School's National Football Tournament. Guthrie then left Shropshire to live in Merseyside at the age of 16 to further his footballing career at Liverpool.

== Club career ==
=== Liverpool ===
Guthrie's first appearance with the Liverpool senior team came during the summer of 2006 in a pre-season friendly at Wrexham, where he played as a left midfielder. He made his competitive first-team debut in a Football League Cup third round tie against Reading on 25 October 2006, coming on as a 62nd-minute substitute for Mohamed Sissoko in a 4–3 victory at Anfield. On 29 November, he made his Premier League debut in a goalless home draw against Portsmouth, filling in for the last six minutes in place of Jermaine Pennant. He started his first match for Liverpool in the UEFA Champions League against Galatasaray on 5 December, a 3–2 away defeat for Liverpool.

=== Southampton (loan) ===
On 2 March 2007, Guthrie signed for Southampton on an emergency loan deal until the end of the month which was subsequently extended to the end of the season.

=== Bolton Wanderers (loan) ===
Guthrie spent the 2007–08 season with Bolton Wanderers, who at the start of the season were managed by former Liverpool player and coach Sammy Lee. Lee left the club by mutual consent in October, and there was speculation that Guthrie would not stay at Bolton for the rest of his loan spell. However, Gary Megson showed faith in Guthrie when he took over and he played intermittently. He scored on his Bolton debut against Fulham in the League Cup, his first professional goal. He was also in the starting XI for the Bolton team that drew 2–2 with Bayern Munich at the Allianz Arena during the UEFA Cup. Megson further showed faith in Guthrie by starting him in the line up in Megson's second league match, a victory at home to Manchester United. Guthrie completed the season with 25 Premier League appearances before returning to Liverpool.

=== Newcastle United ===
Guthrie signed for Newcastle on 11 July 2008 for an undisclosed fee, believed to be in the region of £2.5 million, on a four-year contract. His new manager, Kevin Keegan, compared him to former Newcastle favourites Rob Lee and Paul Bracewell. Guthrie made his debut for Newcastle in a pre-season game against Hartlepool United, where he came on at half time and managed to score one goal and create another. He added to this on 6 August by scoring against PSV Eindhoven at St James' Park on his home debut. On 17 August, Guthrie made his competitive debut alongside fellow debutants Jonás Gutiérrez and Fabricio Coloccini in a 1–1 draw against Manchester United at Old Trafford. On 13 September, Guthrie received a late red card, being sent off in a home loss to Hull City following a cynical hack at Craig Fagan, who was later revealed to have broken his leg. Guthrie scored his first Premier League goal for Newcastle on 14 December as part of a 3–0 away win against Portsmouth. His second goal came on 26 December from the penalty spot as part of a 2–1 away loss to Wigan Athletic.

During the 2008–09 season, Guthrie featured regularly and formed a midfield partnership with Nicky Butt, an opportunity granted to him after starter Joey Barton sustained an injury. For his performances during the season, he gained praise from the media and fans alike, becoming a surprise favourite with the Toon Army as a result.

Guthrie became a more regular starter during the 2009–10 season as Newcastle, relegated from the Premiership, were participating in the Football League Championship. He scored three goals in three games, netting in the 4–3 League Cup win over Huddersfield Town and then scoring the only goal in a 1–0 win over Leicester City, then in the 2–2 draw against West Bromwich Albion. Guthrie scored two goals and was voted man of the match in a 6–1 win over Barnsley. He had his best season with Newcastle during the year in the Championship, scoring five goals from 43 games and having his team's highest number of assists, with 13.

After promotion back to the Premier League for the 2010–11 season, Guthrie took part in Newcastle's pre-season fixtures, playing in the 2–2 draw with PSV on the left wing, and in central midfield alongside Joey Barton in a 2–1 defeat to Rangers. He missed the opening fixtures of the Premier League season against Manchester United, Aston Villa, Wolverhampton Wanderers and Blackpool with a knee injury . He returned to contention in October after making a string of reserve team games. He returned to play against Wigan in a 2–2 draw, playing on the right wing. He was dropped for the next game, however, after an unimpressive display. Throughout the season, Guthrie was largely an out-of-favour player with Newcastle after the signing of Cheick Tioté in August 2010. The consistent form of Joey Barton and Kevin Nolan also kept the 24-year-old on the bench throughout much of the season, where he only registered one assist.

A knee injury suffered in pre-season kept Guthrie out of the first few months of the 2011–12 Premier League season and made his return in the 4–3 League Cup defeat to Blackburn Rovers, scoring a long-range goal in the process. Due to an injury to Tioté, Guthrie started against Stoke City and Everton. On 21 January 2012, he scored a superb long-range goal against Fulham at Craven Cottage to give Newcastle a 1–0 lead, a game they would eventually go on to lose 5–2.

Guthrie was released by Newcastle on 1 June 2012.

=== Reading ===
On 29 June 2012, Guthrie signed a three-year contract at newly promoted Premier League club Reading on a free transfer. He scored his first goal for Reading in only his second game, away at Chelsea, after goalkeeper Petr Čech spilled his free kick into the net.

In October, it was reported by local and national newspapers that Guthrie and Reading manager Brian McDermott had fallen out after he was dropped from the team for the 3–3 draw with Fulham. The claims were denied by both the player and manager. On 11 December, McDermott revealed that Guthrie had refused to travel with the team for the away game against Sunderland, as his "head was not in the right place". He was fined two weeks wages and the following day issued a full apology stating that he had "loved his time at the club" and would do everything in his power to regain a first-team spot. McDermott later stated that he was happy to draw a line under the recent events and that Guthrie still had a future at the club.

Guthrie began the 2013–14 season in good form, scoring twice against Birmingham City and earning a Championship Player of the Month nomination, although he eventually lost out to Ipswich Town striker David McGoldrick. He attributed his upturn in form to the new style of football implemented by McDermott's replacement Nigel Adkins.

Guthrie was released by Reading on 21 May 2015.

=== Fulham (loan) ===
On 26 March 2015, having dropped down the pecking order at Reading, Guthrie joined Fulham on loan until the end of the season.

=== Blackburn Rovers ===
Guthrie signed a two-year deal with Blackburn Rovers following a successful trial on 5 August 2015. He made his debut six days later in a 1–2 home defeat to Shrewsbury Town in the first round of the League Cup as a 65th-minute replacement for Corry Evans. He scored his first goal for Blackburn in a 3–1 win over Brentford on 7 May 2017, after which despite the result Blackburn were relegated.

=== Oakengates Athletic and Mitra Kukar ===
After being released by Rovers at the end of the season, Guthrie rejected offers from Championship and League One clubs as he wanted to play abroad. After reaching an agreement with Indonesian Liga club, Mitra Kukar, he signed for Oakengates Athletic to keep his fitness. He left the club in January, signing for Mitra Kukar ahead of the 2018 Indonesian Liga.

=== Walsall ===
On 11 July 2019, Guthrie returned to English football to sign for League Two club Walsall. On 1 February 2021, he left the club by mutual consent.

=== Fram ===
On 4 May 2021, Guthrie joined Icelandic 1. deild karla side Fram for the 2021 season. He played 17 matches during the 2021 season, helping them win the league and promotion to the Úrvalsdeild karla.

== International career ==
At international level, Guthrie represented the England under-16 national team. He made four appearances, scoring once for the England under-17 side in 2003, playing in the Nordic Cup.

== Personal life ==
In May 2019 he borrowed £75,000 from a friend to pay his expenses, promising to repay the loan after selling a home. After selling the home for £160,000 in 2022, he choose to withdraw sums in cash from his personal account to pay off previously accrued gambling debts in excess of £120,000. After a series of Court actions, in June 2022 Guthrie filed for bankruptcy after racking up unpaid debts of £195,000. After agreeing with evidence collected by the Insolvency Service, he was placed under a six-year Bankruptcy Undertaking Order.

== Career statistics ==
Appearances and goals by club, season and competition
Club	Season	League			National Cup		League Cup		Other		Total	
Club	Season	Division	Apps	Goals	Apps	Goals	Apps	Goals	Apps	Goals	Apps	Goals
Liverpool	2006–07	Premier League	3	0	0	0	3	0	1 (Note: Appearance in UEFA Champions League)	0	7	0
Liverpool	2007–08	Premier League	0	0	0	0	0	0	0	0	0	0
Liverpool	Total		3	0	0	0	3	0	1	0	7	0
Southampton (loan)	2006–07	Championship	10	0	—		—		2 (Note: Appearances in Championship play-offs)	0	12	0
Bolton Wanderers (loan)	2007–08	Premier League	25	0	1	0	2	1	7 (Note: Appearances in UEFA Cup)	0	35	1
Newcastle United	2008–09	Premier League	24	2	2	0	1	0	—		27	2
Newcastle United	2009–10	Championship	38	4	3	0	2	1	—		43	5
Newcastle United	2010–11	Premier League	14	0	0	0	1	0	—		15	0
Newcastle United	2011–12	Premier League	16	1	1	0	2	1	—		19	2
Newcastle United	Total		92	7	6	0	6	2	—		104	9
Reading	2012–13	Premier League	21	1	3	0	1	0	—		25	1
Reading	2013–14	Championship	32	4	1	0	0	0	—		33	4
Reading	2014–15	Championship	9	0	1	0	1	0	—		11	0
Reading	Total		62	5	5	0	2	0	—		69	5
Fulham (loan)	2014–15	Championship	6	0	—		—		—		6	0
Blackburn Rovers	2015–16	Championship	16	0	0	0	1	0	—		17	0
Blackburn Rovers	2016–17	Championship	24	1	2	0	1	0	—		27	1
Blackburn Rovers	Total		40	1	2	0	2	0	—		44	1
Mitra Kukar	2018	Liga 1	29	2	0	0	—		0	0	29	2
Walsall	2019–20	League Two	25	1	1	0	0	0	2 (Note: Appearances in EFL Trophy)	0	28	1
Walsall	2020–21	League Two	14	0	0	0	0	0	2	0	16	0
Walsall	Total		39	1	1	0	0	0	4	0	44	1
Fram	2021	1. deild karla	16	0	1	0	—		0	0	17	0
Career total			322	16	16	0	15	3	14	0	367	19

== Honours ==
Newcastle United

- Football League Championship: 2009–10

Fram

- 1. deild karla: 2021
