= 2013–14 Inverness Caledonian Thistle F.C. season =

Scottish football club season

Inverness Caledonian Thistle
2013–14 season
- Chairman: Kenny Cameron
- Manager: Terry Butcher (until 12 November); John Hughes (from 4 December)
- Stadium: Caledonian Stadium
- Premiership: 5th place
- League Cup: Final lost to Aberdeen
- Scottish Cup: Quarter-final lost to Dundee United
- Top goalscorer: League: Billy McKay (18); All: Billy McKay (22)
- Highest home attendance: 6,384 v. Celtic, 29 December 2013
- Lowest home attendance: 2,366 v. Motherwell, 1 April 2014
- Average home league attendance: 3,558
Home colours	Away colours

The 2013–14 season was Inverness Caledonian Thistle's fourth consecutive season in the top flight of Scottish football and the first in the newly established Scottish Premiership, having been promoted from the Scottish First Division at the end of the 2009–10 season. Inverness also competed in the League Cup and the Scottish Cup.

== Results and fixtures ==
Win Draw Loss Postponed

=== Pre-season ===
6 July 2013 Friendly	Keith	0–9	Inverness Caledonian Thistle	Kynoch Park
19.30		Report	Shinnie; Ross; McKay; Warren; Christie

9 July 2013 Friendly	Forres Mechanics	0–3	Inverness Caledonian Thistle	Mosset Park
19.30		Report	McKay

13 July 2013 Friendly	Elgin City	0–2	Inverness Caledonian Thistle	Borough Briggs
15.00		Report	Warren; Foran	Attendance: 559

16 July 2013 Friendly	Brora Rangers	1–2	Inverness Caledonian Thistle	Dudgeon Park
19.30	Sutherland	Report	McKay; Vincent

17 July 2013 Friendly	Clachnacuddin	0–4	Inverness Caledonian Thistle	Grant Street Park
19.00		Report	Christie; Brown; Ferguson

20 July 2013 Friendly	Raith Rovers	2–2	Inverness Caledonian Thistle	Stark's Park
15.00	Anderson 2'; Elliot 36'	Report	Watson 42' (o.g.); Polworth 83'

23 July 2013 Friendly	Arbroath	1–7	Inverness Caledonian Thistle	Gayfield Park
19.30	Smith 73'	Report	McKay 9' 11' 15' 31' 83'; Meekings 55'; Polworth 66'

24 July 2013 Friendly	Wick Academy	1–5	Inverness Caledonian Thistle	Harmsworth Park
19.30	Trialist 88'	Report	Ross 17'; Draper 25'; Evans 28'; Christie 61'; Sutherand 67'

27 July 2013 Friendly	(England) Charlton Athletic	0–1	Inverness Caledonian Thistle	The Valley
15.00		Report	Meekings 80'	Attendance: 2,801

=== Scottish Premiership ===
3 August 2013 Scottish Premiership	Inverness Caledonian Thistle	3–0	St Mirren	Caledonian Stadium
15:00	Vincent 47' (pen.); Doran 49'; McKay 57'	ICT Website Report	van Zanten (red card) 80'	Attendance: 3,215; Referee: Kevin Clancy

10 August 2013 Scottish Premiership	Dundee United	0–1	Inverness Caledonian Thistle	Tannadice Park
15:00		BBC Report	McKay 20'	Attendance: 6,664; Referee: Steven McLean

17 August 2013 Scottish Premiership	Inverness Caledonian Thistle	2–0	Motherwell	Caledonian Stadium
15:00	Foran 4'; McKay 36'	BBC Report		Attendance: 3,031; Referee: Iain Brines

24 August 2013 Scottish Premiership	Celtic	2–2	Inverness Caledonian Thistle	Celtic Park
15:00	Mulgrew 42'; Matthews 82'	BBC Report	Doran 14'; Foran 35'	Attendance: 45,160; Referee: Craig Thomson

31 August 2013 Scottish Premiership	Inverness Caledonian Thistle	2–0	Hearts	Caledonian Stadium
15:00	McKay 10' 32'	BBC Report	Hamill (red card) 82'	Attendance: 4,034; Referee: John Beaton

14 September 2013 Scottish Premiership	Kilmarnock	1–2	Inverness Caledonian Thistle	Rugby Park
15:00	Nicholson 51'	BBC Report	Foran 6'; McKay 56'	Attendance: 3,063; Referee: Steven McLean

21 September 2013 Scottish Premiership	Aberdeen	1–0	Inverness Caledonian Thistle	Pittodrie Stadium
15:00	Vernon 81'	BBC Report		Attendance: 11,251; Referee: Craig Thomson

28 September 2013 Scottish Premiership	Inverness Caledonian Thistle	3–0	Hibernian	Caledonian Stadium
15:00	McKay 11' 61'; Foran 59'	BBC Report		Attendance: 4,261; Referee: Willie Collum

5 October 2013 Scottish Premiership	St Johnstone	4–0	Inverness Caledonian Thistle	McDiarmid Park
15:00	May 18'; MacKay 27'; MacLean 73' 82'	BBC Report		Attendance: 3,020; Referee: Steven McLean

20 October 2013 Scottish Premiership	Inverness Caledonian Thistle	1–2	Partick Thistle	Caledonian Stadium
12:45	Warren 47'	BBC Report	Doolan 20' 83'	Attendance: 3,154; Referee: Euan Norris

25 October 2013 Scottish Premiership	Ross County	A – A	Inverness Caledonian Thistle	Victoria Park
19:45		Report		Referee: John Beaton

2 November 2013 Scottish Premiership	Inverness Caledonian Thistle	2–1	Kilmarnock	Caledonian Stadium
15:00	Doran 7'; Shinnie 52'	BBC Report	Barr 76'	Attendance: 2,948; Referee: Steven McLean

9 November 2013 Scottish Premiership	Hibernian	0–2	Inverness Caledonian Thistle	Easter Road
15:00		BBC Report	Ross 14' (pen.); McKay 18'	Attendance: 8,750; Referee: Bobby Madden

23 November 2013 Scottish Premiership	Inverness Caledonian Thistle	1–0	St Johnstone	Caledonian Stadium
15:00	McKay 4'	BBC Report		Attendance: 3,255; Referee: John Beaton

7 December 2013 Scottish Premiership	St Mirren	0–0	Inverness Caledonian Thistle	St Mirren Park
15:00		BBC Report		Attendance: 3,305; Referee: Calum Murray

14 December 2013 Scottish Premiership	Hearts	0–2	Inverness Caledonian Thistle	Tynecastle Stadium
15:00		BBC Report	McKay 59' 83'	Attendance: 11,950; Referee: Brian Colvin

21 December 2013 Scottish Premiership	Inverness Caledonian Thistle	3–4	Aberdeen	Caledonian Stadium
17:30	McKay 47' 57'; Shinnie 90'	BBC Report	Robson 22' (pen.) 32'; Pawlett 37'; McGinn 44'	Attendance: 4,810; Referee: Steven McLean

26 December 2013 Scottish Premiership	Partick Thistle	0–0	Inverness Caledonian Thistle	Firhill
15:00		BBC Report		Attendance: 2,887; Referee: Willie Collum

29 December 2013 Scottish Premiership	Inverness Caledonian Thistle	0–1	Celtic	Caledonian Stadium
12:30		BBC Report	Commons 3'	Attendance: 6,384; Referee: Crawford Allan

1 January 2014 Scottish Premiership	Inverness Caledonian Thistle	1–2	Ross County	Caledonian Stadium
15:00	Draper (red card) 75'; Doran 89'	BBC Report	Boyd 15'; Cooper 17'	Attendance: 4,332; Referee: Alan Muir

4 January 2014 Scottish Premiership	Motherwell	P – P	Inverness Caledonian Thistle	Fir Park
12:45		BBC Report		Referee: Craig Thomson

12 January 2014 Scottish Premiership	Inverness Caledonian Thistle	1–1	Dundee United	Caledonian Stadium
12:45	McKay 5'	BBC Report	Watson 10'	Attendance: 2,980; Referee: John Beaton

18 January 2014 Scottish Premiership	Aberdeen	0–1	Inverness Caledonian Thistle	Pittodrie Stadium
15:00		BBC Report	Williams 22'	Attendance: 12,021; Referee: Iain Brines

25 January 2014 Scottish Premiership	Kilmarnock	2–0	Inverness Caledonian Thistle	Rugby Park
15:00	Ashcroft 16'; Boyd 74'	BBC Report		Attendance: 3,035; Referee: Willie Collum

15 February 2014 Scottish Premiership	Inverness Caledonian Thistle	0–0	Hearts	Caledonian Stadium
15:00		BBC Report		Attendance: 3,392; Referee: Craig Thomson

22 February 2014 Scottish Premiership	St Johnstone	0–1	Inverness Caledonian Thistle	McDiarmid Park
15:00		BBC Report	Warren 42'	Attendance: 2,415; Referee: Euan Norris

25 February 2014 Scottish Premiership	Ross County	0–3	Inverness Caledonian Thistle	Victoria Park
19:45		Report	Raven 8'; McKay 40'; Watkins 78'	Attendance: 4,805; Referee: Calum Murray

1 March 2014 Scottish Premiership	Celtic	5–0	Inverness Caledonian Thistle	Celtic Park
15:00	Griffiths 12', 57', 85'; Mulgrew 22'; Commons 78'	BBC Report		Attendance: 46,552; Referee: Brian Colvin

12 March 2014 Scottish Premiership	Inverness Caledonian Thistle	0–0	Hibernian	Caledonian Stadium
19:45		BBC Report		Attendance: 2,537; Referee: Stephen Finnie

19 March 2014 Scottish Premiership	Motherwell	2–0	Inverness Caledonian Thistle	Fir Park
19:45	Ainsworth 26'; Sutton 34'	BBC Report		Attendance: 3,432; Referee: Alan Muir

22 March 2014 Scottish Premiership	Inverness Caledonian Thistle	1–0	Partick Thistle	Caledonian Stadium
15:00	McKay 62'	BBC Report		Attendance: 3,093; Referee: Kevin Clancy

26 March 2014 Scottish Premiership	Dundee United	2–1	Inverness Caledonian Thistle	Tannadice Park
19:45	Gauld 49'; Dow 76'	BBC Report	Polworth 81'	Attendance: 6,754; Referee: Euan Norris

29 March 2014 Scottish Premiership	Inverness Caledonian Thistle	2–2	St Mirren	Caledonian Stadium
15:00	Draper 16'; Tansey 34'; Meekings (red card) 68'	BBC Report	Naismith 3'; Kelly 62'	Attendance: 3,032; Referee: Willie Collum

1 April 2014 Scottish Premiership	Inverness Caledonian Thistle	1–2	Motherwell	Caledonian Stadium
19:45	Christie 74'	BBC Report	Anier 40'; Vigurs 83'	Attendance: 2,366; Referee: Craig Thomson

4 April 2014 Scottish Premiership	Ross County	1–2	Inverness Caledonian Thistle	Victoria Park
19:45	Kiss 50'	Report	Doran 45'; McKay 79'	Attendance: 4,433; Referee: Calum Murray

18 April 2014 Scottish Premiership	Inverness Caledonian Thistle	0–0	Aberdeen	Caledonian Stadium
19:45		BBC Report		Attendance: 4,224; Referee: Bobby Madden

27 April 2014 Scottish Premiership	Celtic	6–0	Inverness Caledonian Thistle	Celtic Park
15:00	Stokes 34', 45+1', 53' (pen.); Griffiths 68'; Ambrose 78'; Pukki 79'	BBC Report		Attendance: 45,712; Referee: Craig Charleston

3 May 2014 Scottish Premiership	Inverness Caledonian Thistle	1–1	Dundee United	Caledonian Stadium
15:00	Christie 7'	BBC Report	El Alagui 71'	Attendance: 3,428; Referee: Brian Colvin

7 May 2014 Scottish Premiership	Motherwell	2–1	Inverness Caledonian Thistle	Fir Park
19:45	Sutton 4' (pen.); Warren 32' (o.g.)	BBC Report	Shinnie 55'	Attendance: 4,482; Referee: Willie Collum

11 May 2014 Scottish Premiership	Inverness Caledonian Thistle	2–0	St Johnstone	Caledonian Stadium
12:15	Christie 59'; Tansey 90'	BBC Report		Attendance: 3,121; Referee: Alan Muir

=== Scottish League Cup ===
24 September 2013 Round 3	Dundee	0–1	Inverness Caledonian Thistle	Dens Park
19:45		BBC Sport	McKay 11'	Attendance: 1,682; Referee: Stephen Finnie

29 October 2013 Quarter-final	Inverness Caledonian Thistle	2–1 (a.e.t.)	Dundee United	Caledonian Stadium
19:45	Warren 54'; Draper 120'	BBC Sport	Watson 5'; Çiftçi (red card) 42'	Attendance: 2,133; Referee: Kevin Clancy

2 February 2014 Semi-final	Hearts	2–2 (a.e.t.) (2–4 p)	Inverness Caledonian Thistle	Easter Road
12.15	Hamill 68', 70'	BBC Sport	Tansey 54'; Warren (red card) 66'; Meekings (red card) 90'; Ross 90'	Attendance: 12,762; Referee: John Beaton
	Penalties
	McCallum (penalty missed); Carrick (penalty scored); Hamill (penalty missed); Robinson (penalty scored)		Shinnie (penalty missed); McKay (penalty scored); Ross (penalty scored); Tansey (penalty scored); Draper (penalty scored)

16 March 2014 Final	Aberdeen	0–0 (a.e.t.) (4–2 p)	Inverness Caledonian Thistle	Celtic Park
14.30		BBC Sport		Attendance: 51,143; Referee: Steven McLean
	Penalties
	Robson (penalty scored); Low (penalty scored); Vernon (penalty scored); Rooney (penalty scored)		(penalty missed) McKay; (penalty missed) Tansey; (penalty scored) Ross; (penalty scored) Doran

=== Scottish Cup ===
30 November 2013 Fourth Round	Inverness Caledonian Thistle	4–0	Morton	Caledonian Stadium
15:00	Ross 45' (pen.); McKay 71' 90'; Doran 90' (pen.)	BBC Sport		Referee: Don Robertson

8 February 2014 Fifth Round	Stranraer	2–2	Inverness Caledonian Thistle	Stair Park
15:00	Grehan 45' (pen.); Longworth 72'	BBC Sport	Doran 40'; McKay 74'	Attendance: 722; Referee: Kevin Clancy

18 February 2014 Fifth Round replay	Inverness Caledonian Thistle	2–0	Stranraer	Caledonian Stadium
19:45	Ross 3'; Doran 90'	BBC Sport		Attendance: 1,458; Referee: Alan Muir

9 March 2014 Quarter-final	Inverness Caledonian Thistle	0–5	Dundee United	Caledonian Stadium
12.30	Tansey (red card) 44'; Watkins (red card) 72'	BBC Sport	Çiftçi 16', 28'; Gunning 36' (pen.); Mackay-Steven 49'; Armstrong 57'	Attendance: 3,164; Referee: Willie Collum

== Player statistics ==
=== Captains ===
No.	P	Name	Country	No. games	Notes
9	MF	Richie Foran	(Republic of Ireland)	28	Club captain
3	DF	Graeme Shinnie	(Scotland)	17	
5	DF	Gary Warren	(England)	1	

Last updated: 11 May 2014
Source: Competitive match reports.
Competitive matches only
Matches started as captain only
Country: FIFA nationality; No.: Squad number; P: Position; Name: Player name; No. Games: Number of games started as captain.

=== Appearances & Goals ===
Includes all competitive matches.

Last updated 11 May 2014

No.	Pos	Nat	Player	Total		Premiership		League Cup		Scottish Cup	
No.	Pos	Nat	Player	Apps	Goals	Apps	Goals	Apps	Goals	Apps	Goals
1	GK	(Scotland) SCO	Ryan Esson	1	0	1+0	0	0+0	0	0+0	0
2	DF	(England) ENG	David Raven	32	1	25+1	1	3+0	0	3+0	0
3	DF	(Scotland) SCO	Graeme Shinnie	44	3	36+0	3	4+0	0	4+0	0
4	MF	(England) ENG	James Vincent	27	1	19+2	1	3+0	0	3+0	0
5	DF	(England) ENG	Gary Warren	40	3	34+0	2	2+0	1	4+0	0
6	DF	(England) ENG	Josh Meekings	42	0	34+0	0	4+0	0	4+0	0
7	FW	(Northern Ireland) NIR	Billy McKay	46	22	38+0	18	4+0	1	4+0	3
8	MF	(England) ENG	Ross Draper	41	2	33+1	1	4+0	1	3+0	0
9	MF	(Republic of Ireland) IRL	Richie Foran	30	4	23+1	4	3+0	0	2+1	0
10	MF	(Republic of Ireland) IRL	Aaron Doran	41	8	33+0	5	3+1	0	3+1	3
11	MF	(Scotland) SCO	Nick Ross	39	4	25+8	1	2+2	1	2+0	2
12	GK	(England) ENG	Dean Brill	45	0	37+0	0	4+0	0	4+0	0
14	DF	(Northern Ireland) NIR	Daniel Devine	16	0	8+5	0	2+1	0	0+0	0
15	MF	(England) ENG	Marley Watkins	33	1	15+11	1	3+0	0	3+1	0
16	MF	(England) ENG	Greg Tansey	21	3	15+1	2	2+0	1	3+0	0
17	MF	(England) ENG	Ben Greenhalgh	6	0	1+5	0	0+0	0	0+0	0
18	DF	(England) ENG	Carl Tremarco	24	0	20+1	0	1+1	0	1+0	0
19	MF	(England) ENG	Danny Williams	24	1	11+9	1	0+1	0	0+3	0
20	MF	(Scotland) SCO	Liam Polworth	23	1	7+12	1	0+2	0	1+1	0
21	MF	(Republic of Ireland) IRL	Conor Pepper	0	0	0+0	0	0+0	0	0+0	0
22	DF	(Scotland) SCO	Matthew Cooper	0	0	0+0	0	0+0	0	0+0	0
23	FW	(Norway) NOR	Torbjørn Agdestein	16	0	0+13	0	0+2	0	0+1	0
31	GK	(England) ENG	Nick Draper	0	0	0+0	0	0+0	0	0+0	0
32	MF	(Scotland) SCO	Jay Cheyne	0	0	0+0	0	0+0	0	0+0	0
33	DF	(Scotland) SCO	Calum Howarth	0	0	0+0	0	0+0	0	0+0	0
34	MF	(Scotland) SCO	Jason Brown	0	0	0+0	0	0+0	0	0+0	0
35	DF	(Republic of Ireland) IRL	Joe Gorman	0	0	0+0	0	0+0	0	0+0	0
36	MF	(Scotland) SCO	Ryan Christie	17	3	3+12	3	0+1	0	0+1	0
37	FW	(Scotland) SCO	Alisdair Sutherland	0	0	0+0	0	0+0	0	0+0	0
39	FW	(Canada) CAN	Calum Ferguson	0	0	0+0	0	0+0	0	0+0	0
40	MF	(Republic of Ireland) IRL	Adam Evans	2	0	0+2	0	0+0	0	0+0	0
42	GK	(Scotland) SCO	Cameron Mackay	0	0	0+0	0	0+0	0	0+0	0
	FW	(Northern Ireland) NIR	Curtis Allen	0	0	0+0	0	0+0	0	0+0	0

=== Hat-tricks ===
Player	Competition	Score	Opponent	Date
(Northern Ireland) Billy Mckay	Friendly	0–9	Keith	6 July 2013
(Northern Ireland) Billy Mckay	Friendly	0–3	Forres Mechanics	9 July 2013
(Northern Ireland) Billy Mckay^{5}	Friendly	1–7	Arbroath	23 July 2013

=== Disciplinary record ===
Includes all competitive matches.

Last updated 11 May 2014

Number	Nation	Position	Name	Premiership		League Cup		Scottish Cup		Total	
Number	Nation	Position	Name	Yellow card	Red card	Yellow card	Red card	Yellow card	Red card	Yellow card	Red card
2	(England)	DF	David Raven	5	0	1	0	0	0	6	0
3	(Scotland)	DF	Graeme Shinnie	7	0	2	0	1	0	10	0
4	(England)	MF	James Vincent	1	0	0	0	0	0	1	0
5	(England)	DF	Gary Warren	8	0	1	1	0	0	9	1
6	(England)	DF	Josh Meekings	1	1	1	0	1	0	3	1
7	(Northern Ireland)	FW	Billy McKay	1	0	1	0	0	0	2	0
8	(England)	MF	Ross Draper	6	1	2	0	2	0	10	1
9	(Republic of Ireland)	MF	Richie Foran	7	0	2	0	1	0	10	0
10	(Republic of Ireland)	MF	Aaron Doran	3	0	0	0	0	0	3	0
11	(Scotland)	MF	Nick Ross	1	0	0	0	0	0	1	0
14	(Northern Ireland)	DF	Daniel Devine	0	0	1	0	0	0	1	0
15	(England)	MF	Marley Watkins	4	0	1	0	1	1	6	1
16	(England)	MF	Greg Tansey	3	0	0	0	1	1	4	1
18	(England)	DF	Carl Tremarco	7	0	1	0	0	0	8	0
19	(England)	MF	Danny Williams	3	0	0	0	0	0	3	0
20	(Scotland)	MF	Liam Polworth	1	0	0	0	0	0	1	0
36	(Scotland)	MF	Ryan Christie	1	0	0	0	0	0	1	0

== Team statistics ==
=== League table ===
Pos	Team	Pld	W	D	L	GF	GA	GD	Pts	Qualification or relegation
3	Aberdeen	38	20	8	10	53	38	+15	68	Qualification for the Europa League first qualifying round
4	Dundee United	38	16	10	12	65	50	+15	58	
5	Inverness Caledonian Thistle	38	16	9	13	44	44	0	57	
6	St Johnstone	38	15	8	15	48	42	+6	53	Qualification for the Europa League second qualifying round (Note: St Johnstone, as winners of the 2013–14 Scottish Cup, qualified for the Europa League second qualifying round.)
7	Ross County	38	11	7	20	44	62	−18	40	

Source: SPFL Archive
Rules for classification: 1) points; 2) goal difference; 3) number of goals scored.

=== Position summary ===
Round	1	2	3	4	5	6	7	8	9	10	11	12	13	14	15	16	17	18	19	20	21	22	23	24	25	26	27	28	29	30	31	32	33	34	35	36	37	38
Ground	H	A	H	A	H	A	A	H	A	H	H	A	H	A	A	H	A	H	H	H	A	A	H	A	A	A	H	A	H	A	H	H	A	H	A	H	A	H
Result	W	W	W	D	W	W	L	W	L	L	W	W	W	D	W	L	D	L	L	D	W	L	D	W	W	L	D	L	W	L	D	L	W	D	L	D	L	W
Position	1	1	1	1	1	1	1	1	2	2	2	2	2	2	2	4	3	4	4	5	4	4	5	5	4	5	4	5	5	5	5	5	5	5	5	5	5	5

Updated to match(es) played on 11 May 2014. Source:
A = Away; H = Home; W = Win; D = Draw; L = Loss

=== Personnel awards ===
Last updated 20 April 2014

Player	Award	Month
(Republic of Ireland) Richie Foran	SPFL Player of the Month	August
(England) Terry Butcher	SPFL Manager of the Month	August
(Northern Ireland) Billy McKay	SPFL Player of the Month	September
(Scotland) Graeme Shinnie	PFA Scotland Team of the Year	

== Transfers ==
Transfers In
Player	Age*	Pos	From	Fee	Date
(Northern Ireland) Curtis Allen	25	ST	(Northern Ireland) Coleraine	Free	1 July 2013
(Wales) Marley Watkins	22	MF	(England) Hereford United	Free	1 July 2013
(Republic of Ireland) Adam Evans	19	MF	(England) Burnley	Free	1 July 2013
(England) Harry Hooman	23	DF	(England) Cheltenham Town	Free	1 July 2013
(England) Ben Greenhalgh	21	ST	(England) Concord Rangers	Free	1 July 2013
(England) James Vincent	23	MF	(England) Kidderminster Harriers	Free	1 July 2013
(England) Danny Williams	25	MF	(England) Kendal Town	Free	1 July 2013
(England) Nick Draper	19	GK	(England) Lincoln City	Free	1 July 2013
(Republic of Ireland) Joe Gorman	18	DF	(England) Crewe Alexandra	Free	1 July 2013
(Scotland) Ryan Christie	18	MF	Academy	Free	1 July 2013
(Scotland) Jay Cheyne	18	DF	Academy	Free	1 July 2013
(England) Carl Tremarco	27	DF	(England) Macclesfield Town	Free	18 July 2013
(Norway) Torbjørn Agdestein	21	ST	(England) Brighton & Hove Albion	Free	28 July 2013
(England) Dean Brill	27	GK	(England) Luton Town	Free	12 November 2013
(England) Greg Tansey	25	MF	(England) Stevenage	Free	17 January 2014

Player	Age*	Pos	To	Fee	Date
(Scotland) Andrew Shinnie	23	MF	(England) Birmingham City	Free	1 July 2013
(Wales) Owain Tudur Jones	28	MF	(Scotland) Hibernian	Free	1 July 2013
(Spain) Antonio Reguero	30	GK	(Scotland) Kilmarnock	Free	1 July 2013
(Scotland) Scott Mathieson	21	GK	(Scotland) Inverurie Loco Works	Free	1 July 2013
(Scotland) Martin Laing	19	MF	(Scotland) Clachnacuddin	Free	1 July 2013
(England) Chris Hogg	28	DF	Released	N/A	1 July 2013
(Portugal) Andre Martins	26	ST	Retired	N/A	1 July 2013
(Scotland) Gavin Morrison	23	MF	(Scotland) Brora Rangers	Free	14 July 2013
(England) Harry Hooman	23	DF	Retired	N/A	19 July 2013
(Scotland) Shane Sutherland	22	ST	(Scotland) Elgin City	Free	20 July 2013
(Northern Ireland) Curtis Allen	25	ST	(Northern Ireland) Glentoran	Free	2 January 2014
(Norway) Torbjørn Agdestein	22	ST	(Norway) Haugesund	Free	17 March 2014

Loans In/Returns
Player	Age*	Pos	From	Duration	Date In	Date Out	Notes
(England) Dean Brill	27	GK	(England) Luton Town	Season	2 July 2013	11 November 2013	Signed permanent deal on 12 November
(England) Ben Greenhalgh	22	ST	(Scotland) Stenhousemuir	Return	5 May 2014	N/A	

Loans Out/Returns
Player	Age*	Pos	To	Duration	Date Out	Date In
(England) Ben Greenhalgh	21	ST	(Scotland) Stenhousemuir	Half Season	31 March 2014	5 May 2014

== See also ==
- List of Inverness Caledonian Thistle F.C. seasons
