= 2012–13 Inverness Caledonian Thistle F.C. season =

Scottish football club season

Inverness Caledonian Thistle
2012–13 season
- Chairman: Kenny Cameron
- Manager: Terry Butcher
- Stadium: Caledonian Stadium
- Premier League: 4th place
- League Cup: Semi-final, lost to Heart of Midlothian
- Scottish Cup: 5th round, lost to Kilmarnock
- Top goalscorer: League: Billy McKay (23); All: Billy McKay (27)
- Highest home attendance: 6,766 v Ross County, 5 October 2012
- Lowest home attendance: 2,529 v Kilmarnock, 13 February 2013
- Average home league attendance: League: 4,038
Home colours	Away colours

The 2012–13 season was Inverness Caledonian Thistle's third consecutive season in the Scottish Premier League, having been promoted from the Scottish First Division at the end of the 2009–10 season. Inverness also competed in the League Cup and the Scottish Cup.

== Results and fixtures ==
Win Draw Loss Postponed

=== Pre-season ===
7 July 2012 Friendly	Buckie Thistle	1 – 2	Inverness Caledonian Thistle	Borough Briggs
15:00	Robertson 85'	Inverness Report; Report	Sutherland 26'; Laing 80'

10 July 2012 Friendly	Clachnacuddin	0 – 3	Inverness Caledonian Thistle	Grant Street Park
19:30

11 July 2012 Friendly	Forres Mechanics	P – P	Inverness Caledonian Thistle	Mosset Park
		Report

12 July 2012 Friendly	Lossiemouth	P – P	Inverness Caledonian Thistle	Grant Park
		Report

14 July 2012 Friendly	Elgin City	0 – 1	Inverness Caledonian Thistle	Borough Briggs
15:00		Daily Record Report	Ross 83'

18 July 2012 Friendly	Deveronvale	0 – 6	Inverness Caledonian Thistle	Princess Royal Park
		Report	A. Shinnie; Sutherland; G. Shinnie; Ross; Mckay

19 July 2012 Friendly	Muir of Ord Rovers	0 – 10	Inverness Caledonian Thistle	Pavilion Park
19:30

21 July 2012 Friendly	Inverness Caledonian Thistle	3 – 1	Coventry City (England)	Caledonian Stadium
15:00	Foran 19' (pen.); Mckay 49'; Oswell 90'	Report; Coventry Report	Jeffers 53'	Referee: Brines

24 July 2012 Friendly	Brechin City	2 – 1	Inverness Caledonian Thistle	Glebe Park
19:30	McKenna 62' (pen.), 89'	Brechin Report; Report	G. Shinnie 42'

25 July 2012 Friendly	Wick Academy	0 – 0	Inverness Caledonian Thistle	Harmsworth Park

=== Scottish Premier League ===
4 August 2012 Scottish Premier League	St Mirren	2 – 2	Inverness Caledonian Thistle	St Mirren Park
15:00	Guy 32'; McGregor 92'; Guy (red card) 93'	BBC Report	Ross 70'; Mckay 76'	Attendance: 4,104; Referee: McLean

11 August 2012 Scottish Premier League	Inverness Caledonian Thistle	1 – 1	Kilmarnock	Caledonian Stadium
15:00	A. Shinnie 8'; Jones (red card) 79'	BBC Report	Pascali 45'	Attendance: 3,012; Referee: Colvin

18 August 2012 Scottish Premier League	Heart of Midlothian	2 – 2	Inverness Caledonian Thistle	Tynecastle Stadium
15:00	Novikovas 15'; Sutton (pen.), 41'	BBC Report	Foran (red card) 45+2'; A. Shinnie (pen.), 58'; Pepper 90'	Attendance: 11,512; Referee: Madden

25 August 2012 Scottish Premier League	Inverness Caledonian Thistle	2 – 4	Celtic	Caledonian Stadium
	Draper 82', 87'	BBC Report	Wanyama 4'; Watt 25', 64'; Mulgrew 48'	Attendance: 6,100; Referee: Collum

2 September 2012 Scottish Premier League	Motherwell	4 – 1	Inverness Caledonian Thistle	Fir Park
15:00	Hateley 11'; Higdon 12', 72', 79'	BBC Report	Foran 28'	Attendance: 4,031; Referee: O'Reilly

15 September 2012 Scottish Premier League	Inverness Caledonian Thistle	1 – 1	Aberdeen	Caledonian Stadium
15:00	Jones (red card) 56'; Foran (pen.), 57'	BBC Report	Anderson (red card) 66'; Smith 84'	Attendance: 4,499; Referee: Salmond

22 September 2012 Scottish Premier League	Hibernian	2 – 2	Inverness Caledonian Thistle	Easter Road
15:00	Doyle 23'; Wotherspoon 31'	BBC Report	Pepper 39'; Foran 81'	Attendance: 9,908; Referee: Norris

29 September 2012 Scottish Premier League	Inverness Caledonian Thistle	4 – 0	Dundee United	Caledonian Stadium
15:00	Foran 31', 35'; A. Shinnie 70'; Roberts 73'	BBC Report		Attendance: 3,059; Referee: Finnie

5 October 2012 Scottish Premier League	Inverness Caledonian Thistle	3 – 1	Ross County	Caledonian Stadium
19:45	Draper 9'; A. Shinnie 28'; Doran 87'	BBC Report	Vigurs 48'	Attendance: 6,766; Referee: Brines

19 October 2012 Scottish Premier League	Dundee	1 – 4	Inverness Caledonian Thistle	Dens Park
19:45	Nish 13'	BBC Report	Mckay 4', 85'; Warren 7'; A. Shinnie (pen.), 81'	Attendance: 5,006; Referee: Thomson

27 October 2012 Scottish Premier League	Inverness Caledonian Thistle	1 – 1	St Johnstone	Caledonian Stadium
15:00	Mckay 73'	BBC Report	Robertson 90+2'	Attendance: 3,154; Referee: Beaton

3 November 2012 Scottish Premier League	Kilmarnock	1 – 2	Inverness Caledonian Thistle	Rugby Park
15:00	Kelly 56'; Bell (red card) 76'	BBC Report	A. Shinnie 22'; Mckay (pen.), 77'	Attendance: 4,541; Referee: Norris

10 November 2012 Scottish Premier League	Inverness Caledonian Thistle	1 – 1	Heart of Midlothian	Caledonian Stadium
12:00	Tudur Jones 19'	BBC Report	Žaliūkas (pen.), 90'	Attendance: 3,332; Referee: Collum

18 November 2012 Scottish Premier League	Inverness Caledonian Thistle	1 – 5	Motherwell	Caledonian Stadium
12:45	Foran 47'	BBC Report	Higdon 18'; Murphy 21'; Cummins 52'; Ojamaa 72'; Daley 89'	Attendance: 2,948; Referee: McLean

24 November 2012 Scottish Premier League	Celtic	0 – 1	Inverness Caledonian Thistle	Celtic Park
15:00		BBC Report	Mckay 64'	Attendance: 44,379; Referee: Murray

27 November 2012 Scottish Premier League	Aberdeen	2 – 3	Inverness Caledonian Thistle	Pittodrie Stadium
19:45	Magennis 45+3', 50'	BBC Report	Mckay 36', 82'; Warren 58'	Attendance: 9,193; Referee: Muir/Charleston

8 December 2012 Scottish Premier League	Inverness Caledonian Thistle	3 – 0	Hibernian	Caledonian Stadium
15:00	Draper 13'; Foran 76'; Mckay 87'	BBC Report		Attendance: 3,422; Referee: Allan

15 December 2012 Scottish Premier League	Dundee United	4 – 4	Inverness Caledonian Thistle	Tannadice Park
15:00	Meekings 5' (Own goal); Daly 6', 90+3'; Skacel 8'	BBC Report	Mckay 26', 28', 62' (pen.); Warren 86'	Attendance: 5,483; Referee: Beaton

22 December 2012 Scottish Premier League	Inverness Caledonian Thistle	4 – 1	Dundee	Caledonian Stadium
15:00	Mckay 12' (pen.) 48'; Tudur Jones 24'; A. Shinnie 70'	BBC Report	Riley 19'	Attendance: 3,003; Referee: Clancy

26 December 2012 Scottish Premier League	Inverness Caledonian Thistle	2 – 2	St Mirren	Caledonian Stadium
15:00	A. Shinnie 38'; Foran 67'	BBC Report	Imrie 2'; Thompson 55'	Attendance: 3,506; Referee: Collum

29 December 2012 Scottish Premier League	St Johnstone	0 – 0	Inverness Caledonian Thistle	McDiarmid Park
15:00		BBC Report		Attendance: 2,975; Referee: Madden

2 January 2013 Scottish Premier League	Ross County	P – P	Inverness Caledonian Thistle	Victoria Park
15:05		BBC Report
Note: Postponed due to waterlogged pitch

19 January 2013 Scottish Premier League	Inverness Caledonian Thistle	3 – 0	Aberdeen	Caledonian Stadium
15:00	A. Shinnie 53'; Mckay 61', 78'	BBC Report		Attendance: 4,734; Referee: Allan

30 January 2013 Scottish Premier League	St Mirren	2 – 1	Inverness Caledonian Thistle	St Mirren Park
19:45	Gonçalves 26'; Thompson 82'	BBC Report	Mckay (pen.), 45'	Attendance: 3,065; Referee: Muir

9 February 2013 Scottish Premier League	Inverness Caledonian Thistle	1 – 3	Celtic	Caledonian Stadium
12.00	Ross 9'	BBC Report	Commons 20'; Gershon 48'; Miku 82'	Attendance: 6,175; Referee: Thomson

13 February 2013 Scottish Premier League	Inverness Caledonian Thistle	1 – 1	Kilmarnock	Caledonian Stadium
19:45	Ross 21'	BBC Report	Pérez 90'	Attendance: 2,529; Referee: Madden

16 February 2013 Scottish Premier League	Motherwell	3 – 0	Inverness Caledonian Thistle	Fir Park
15:00	Higdon 30', 56'; Law 52'	BBC Report		Attendance: 4,179; Referee: Murray

23 February 2013 Scottish Premier League	Heart of Midlothian	2 – 3	Inverness Caledonian Thistle	Tynecastle Stadium
15:00	Holt 55'; Webster 74'	BBC Report	Warren 15' 77'; Mckay 61'	Attendance: 11,325; Referee: Madden

27 February 2013 Scottish Premier League	Inverness Caledonian Thistle	0 – 0	Dundee United	Caledonian Stadium
19:45		BBC Report		Attendance: 3,413; Referee: Colvin

2 March 2013 Scottish Premier League	Ross County	0 – 0	Inverness Caledonian Thistle	Victoria Park
15:00		BBC Report		Attendance: 5,959; Referee: McLean

9 March 2013 Scottish Premier League	Dundee	1 – 1	Inverness Caledonian Thistle	Dens Park
15:00	Baird 13'	BBC Report	Mckay 83'	Attendance: 4,114; Referee: Thomson

16 March 2013 Scottish Premier League	Inverness Caledonian Thistle	2 – 1	Ross County	Caledonian Stadium
15:00	A. Shinnie 5'; Mckay (pen.), 59'	BBC Report	Lawson 35'	Attendance: 5,750; Referee: Brines

30 March 2013 Scottish Premier League	Hibernian	1 – 2	Inverness Caledonian Thistle	Easter Road
15:00	Griffiths 59'	BBC Report	Draper 48'; A. Shinnie 65'	Attendance: 8,555; Referee: Thomson

5 April 2012 Scottish Premier League	Inverness Caledonian Thistle	0 – 0	St Johnstone	Caledonian Stadium
19:45		BBC Report		Attendance: 3,744; Referee: Clancy

21 April 2013 Scottish Premier League	Celtic	4 – 1	Inverness Caledonian Thistle	Celtic Park
12:45	Hooper 61', 73'; Ledley 66'; Samaras 89'	BBC Report	Doran 90+2'	Attendance: 55,000; Referee: Clancy

27 April 2013 Scottish Premier League	St Johnstone	1 – 0	Inverness Caledonian Thistle	McDiarmid Park
12:00	MacLean 77'	BBC Report		Attendance: 2,368; Referee: Thomson

4 May 2013 Scottish Premier League	Inverness Caledonian Thistle	4 – 3	Motherwell	Caledonian Stadium
15:00	McKay 3', 27', 84'; A. Shinnie 25'	BBC Report	McFadden 36', 64'; Higdon 49' (pen.)	Attendance: 3,857; Referee: Collum

11 May 2013 Scottish Premier League	Inverness Caledonian Thistle	1 – 2	Dundee United	Caledonian Stadium
15:00	Doran 42'	BBC Report	Dow 50'; Mackay-Steven 90'	Attendance: 3,728; Referee: Allan

19 May 2013 Scottish Premier League	Ross County	1 – 0	Inverness Caledonian Thistle	Victoria Park
12:45	Hainault 44'	BBC Report		Attendance: 6,002; Referee: Norris

=== Scottish League Cup ===
29 August 2012 Scottish League Cup round 2	Arbroath	0 – 2	Inverness Caledonian Thistle	Gayfield Park
19:45		BBC Report	A. Shinnie 7', 71'	Attendance: 672; Referee: Finnie

25 September 2012 Scottish League Cup round 3	Stenhousemuir	1 – 1 (a.e.t.) (5 – 6 p)	Inverness Caledonian Thistle	Ochilview Park
19:45	Ferguson 40' (pen.)	BBC Report	Mckay 23'	Attendance: 705; Referee: Madden
	Penalties
	Ferguson (penalty scored); Rodgers (penalty scored); Hodge (penalty missed); Gemmell (penalty scored); McMillan (penalty scored); Kean (penalty scored); Smith (penalty missed)		Foran (penalty missed); G. Shinnie (penalty scored); Morrison (penalty scored); Doran (penalty scored); A. Shinnie (penalty scored); Draper (penalty scored); Roberts (penalty scored)

31 October 2012 Scottish League Cup QF	Rangers	0 – 3	Inverness Caledonian Thistle	Ibrox Stadium
19:45		BBC Report	A. Shinnie 27'; Warren 59'; G. Shinnie (pen.), 79'	Attendance: 28,033; Referee: McLean

26 January 2013 Scottish League Cup SF	Inverness Caledonian Thistle	1 – 1 (a.e.t.) (4 – 5 p)	Heart of Midlothian	Easter Road
15:00	A. Shinnie 49'	BBC Report	Ngoo 66'; Robinson (red card) 77'	Attendance: 16,326; Referee: Norris
	Penalties
	G. Shinnie (penalty scored); A. Shinnie (penalty scored); McKay (penalty scored); Tudur Jones (penalty scored); Roberts (penalty missed)		Žaliūkas (penalty scored); Ngoo (penalty scored); Webster (penalty scored); Novikovas (penalty scored); Taouil (penalty scored)

=== Scottish Cup ===
1 December 2012 Scottish Cup round 4	Ross County	3 – 3	Inverness Caledonian Thistle	Victoria Park
12:15	Quinn 49'; Vigurs 86'; Brittain 90+3'	BBC Report	Mckay 30'; Foran 74', 90+5'	Attendance: 5,077; Referee: Craig Thomson

11 December 2012 Scottish Cup round 4 Replay	Inverness Caledonian Thistle	2 – 1	Ross County	Caledonian Stadium
19:45	McKay (pen.), 9' 54'	BBC Report	Vigurs 41'	Attendance: 4,135; Referee: Craig Thomson

2 February 2013 Scottish Cup round 5	Kilmarnock	2 – 0	Inverness Caledonian Thistle	Rugby Park
15:00	Heffernan 58', 85'	BBC Report		Attendance: 3,172; Referee: Collum

== Player statistics ==
=== Captains ===
No.	P	Name	Country	No. games	Notes
9	FW	Richie Foran	(Republic of Ireland)	22	Club captain
1	GK	Ryan Esson	(Scotland)	2	
3	DF	Graeme Shinnie	(Scotland)	1	

Last updated: 16 February 2013 - List incomplete
Source: Competitive match reports.
Competitive matches only
Matches started as captain only
Country: FIFA nationality; No.: Squad number; P: Position; Name: Player name; No. Games: Number of games started as captain.

=== Appearances & Goals ===
Includes all competitive matches.

Last updated 19 May 2013

No.	Pos	Nat	Player	Total		Premier League		League Cup		Scottish Cup	
No.	Pos	Nat	Player	Apps	Goals	Apps	Goals	Apps	Goals	Apps	Goals
1	GK	(Scotland) SCO	Ryan Esson	18	0	15+0	0	2+0	0	1+0	0
2	DF	(England) ENG	David Raven	43	0	36+0	0	3+1	0	3+0	0
3	DF	(Scotland) SCO	Graeme Shinnie	44	1	37+0	0	4+0	1	3+0	0
4	DF	(Wales) WAL	Owain Tudur Jones	39	2	31+2	2	3+0	0	3+0	0
5	DF	(England) ENG	Gary Warren	38	6	31+0	5	4+0	1	3+0	0
6	MF	(England) ENG	Chris Hogg	3	0	3+0	0	0+0	0	0+0	0
7	FW	(Northern Ireland) NIR	Billy McKay	45	27	33+5	23	4+0	1	3+0	3
8	MF	(England) ENG	Ross Draper	40	5	33+1	5	4+0	0	2+0	0
9	FW	(Republic of Ireland) IRL	Richie Foran	34	10	25+3	8	2+1	0	3+0	2
10	MF	(Scotland) SCO	Andrew Shinnie	45	16	37+1	12	4+0	4	3+0	0
11	MF	(Scotland) SCO	Nick Ross	22	3	8+13	3	0+0	0	1+0	0
12	GK	(Spain) ESP	Antonio Reguero	28	0	23+1	0	2+0	0	2+0	0
14	DF	(England) ENG	Josh Meekings	41	0	31+3	0	4+0	0	3+0	0
15	DF	(England) ENG	Simon King	5	0	4+0	0	1+0	0	0+0	0
16	FW	(England) ENG	Jason Oswell	2	0	0+2	0	0+0	0	0+0	0
17	MF	(Republic of Ireland) IRL	Aaron Doran	45	3	38+0	3	4+0	0	3+0	0
18	FW	(Scotland) SCO	Shane Sutherland	25	0	5+16	0	1+2	0	0+1	0
19	MF	(Scotland) SCO	Gavin Morrison	11	0	2+7	0	0+2	0	0+0	0
20	MF	(Scotland) SCO	Martin Laing	0	0	0+0	0	0+0	0	0+0	0
21	MF	(Scotland) SCO	Liam Polworth	3	0	0+3	0	0+0	0	0+0	0
22	MF	(Republic of Ireland) IRL	Conor Pepper	15	2	2+10	2	1+2	0	0+0	0
23	FW	(Republic of Ireland) IRL	Philip Roberts	23	1	8+9	1	1+2	0	0+3	0
25	DF	(England) ENG	Andre Blackman	2	0	2+0	0	0+0	0	0+0	0
26	MF	(England) ENG	Jordan Gibbons	2	0	0+1	0	0+0	0	0+1	0
27	DF	(Northern Ireland) NIR	Daniel Devine	10	0	8+2	0	0+0	0	0+0	0
28	DF	(England) ENG	Charlie Taylor	8	0	4+3	0	0+0	0	0+1	0
31	GK	(Scotland) SCO	Scott Mathieson	0	0	0+0	0	0+0	0	0+0	0
32	DF	(Scotland) SCO	Matthew Cooper	3	0	2+1	0	0+0	0	0+0	0
37	MF	(Canada) CAN	Calum Ferguson	0	0	0+0	0	0+0	0	0+0	0
38	MF	(Scotland) SCO	Ryan Christie	0	0	0+0	0	0+0	0	0+0	0
40	MF	(Scotland) SCO	Kyle Whyte	0	0	0+0	0	0+0	0	0+0	0

=== Hat-tricks ===
Player	Competition	Score	Opponent	Date
(Northern Ireland) Billy Mckay	Scottish Premier League	4–4	Dundee United	15 December 2012
(Northern Ireland) Billy Mckay	Scottish Premier League	4–3	Motherwell	4 May 2013

=== Disciplinary record ===
Includes all competitive matches.

Last updated 19 May 2013

Number	Nation	Position	Name	Scottish Premier League		League Cup		Scottish Cup		Total	
Number	Nation	Position	Name	Yellow card	Red card	Yellow card	Red card	Yellow card	Red card	Yellow card	Red card
1	(Scotland)	GK	Ryan Esson	0	0	0	0	0	0	0	0
2	(England)	DF	David Raven	5	1	2	0	0	0	7	1
3	(Scotland)	DF	Graeme Shinnie	9	0	0	0	0	0	9	0
4	(Wales)	DF	Owain Tudur Jones	3	2	0	0	0	0	3	2
5	(England)	DF	Gary Warren	6	0	2	0	0	0	8	0
6	(England)	MF	Chris Hogg	0	0	0	0	0	0	0	0
7	(Northern Ireland)	FW	Billy Mckay	0	0	2	0	0	0	2	0
8	(England)	MF	Ross Draper	7	0	0	0	2	0	9	0
9	(Republic of Ireland)	FW	Richie Foran	6	1	1	0	2	0	9	1
10	(Scotland)	MF	Andrew Shinnie	4	0	0	0	1	0	5	0
11	(Scotland)	MF	Nick Ross	0	0	0	0	0	0	0	0
12	(Spain)	GK	Antonio Reguero	0	0	1	0	0	0	1	0
14	(England)	DF	Josh Meekings	4	0	2	0	0	0	6	0
15	(England)	DF	Simon King	3	0	0	0	0	0	3	0
16	(England)	FW	Jason Oswell	0	0	0	0	0	0	0	0
17	(Republic of Ireland)	MF	Aaron Doran	3	0	0	0	0	0	3	0
18	(Scotland)	FW	Shane Sutherland	1	0	0	0	0	0	1	0
19	(Scotland)	MF	Gavin Morrison	2	0	0	0	0	0	2	0
20	(Scotland)	MF	Martin Laing	0	0	0	0	0	0	0	0
21	(Scotland)	MF	Liam Polworth	0	0	0	0	0	0	0	0
22	(Republic of Ireland)	MF	Conor Pepper	3	0	0	0	0	0	3	0
23	(Republic of Ireland)	FW	Philip Roberts	1	0	0	0	0	0	1	0
25	(England)	DF	Andre Blackman	0	0	0	0	0	0	0	0
26	(England)	MF	Jordan Gibbons	0	0	0	0	0	0	0	0
27	(Republic of Ireland)	DF	Daniel Devine	3	0	0	0	0	0	3	0
28	(England)	DF	Charlie Taylor	1	0	0	0	0	0	1	0
31	(Scotland)	GK	Scott Mathieson	0	0	0	0	0	0	0	0
32	(Scotland)	DF	Matthew Cooper	0	0	0	0	0	0	0	0
37	(Canada)	MF	Calum Ferguson	0	0	0	0	0	0	0	0
38	(Scotland)	MF	Ryan Christie	0	0	0	0	0	0	0	0
40	(Scotland)	MF	Kyle Whyte	0	0	0	0	0	0	0	0

== Team statistics ==
=== League table ===
Pos	Team	Pld	W	D	L	GF	GA	GD	Pts	Qualification or relegation
2	Motherwell	38	18	9	11	67	51	+16	63	Qualification for the Europa League third qualifying round
3	St Johnstone	38	14	14	10	45	44	+1	56	Qualification for the Europa League second qualifying round
4	Inverness Caledonian Thistle	38	13	15	10	64	60	+4	54	
5	Ross County	38	13	14	11	47	48	−1	53	
6	Dundee United	38	11	14	13	51	62	−11	47 (Note: Teams in the bottom half at the time of the split may not overtake a team in the top 6 at the time of the split.)	

Source: SPFL Archive
Rules for classification: 1) points; 2) goal difference; 3) number of goals scored.

=== Position summary ===
Round	1	2	3	4	5	6	7	8	9	10	11	12	13	14	15	16	17	18	19	20	21	22	23	24	25	26	27	28	29	30	31	32	33	34	35	36	37	38
Ground	A	H	A	H	A	H	A	H	H	A	H	A	H	H	A	A	H	A	H	H	A	H	A	H	H	A	A	H	A	A	H	A	H	A	A	H	H	A
Result	D	D	D	L	L	D	D	W	W	W	D	W	D	L	W	W	W	D	W	D	D	W	L	L	D	L	W	D	D	D	W	W	D	L	L	W	L	L
Position	3	5	8	8	11	11	11	9	6	3	5	3	4	7	5	2	2	3	2	2	2	2	2	2	2	3	2	3	3	4	3	3	3	3	3	3	3	4

Updated to match(es) played on 19 May 2013. Source:
A = Away; H = Home; W = Win; D = Draw; L = Loss

=== Most frequent line-up ===
By number of appearances

As of 19 May 2013

Formation: 4–2–3–1.

=== Personnel Awards ===
Last updated 19 April 2013

Player	Award	Month
(England) Terry Butcher	SPL Manager of the Month	November
(Northern Ireland) Billy Mckay	SPL Player of the Month	November
(Republic of Ireland) Aaron Doran	SPL Young Player of the Month	November
(England) Josh Meekings	SPL Young Player of the Month	March

== Transfers ==
=== Players in ===
Player	From	Fee
(England) Gary Warren	(Wales) Newport County	Free
(Spain) Antonio Reguero	(Spain) Gandía	Free
(England) David Raven	(England) Tranmere Rovers	Free
(England) Jason Oswell	(England) Crewe Alexandra	Free
(England) Ross Draper	(England) Macclesfield Town	Free
(Republic of Ireland) Conor Pepper	(Republic of Ireland) St. Patrick's Athletic	Free
(England) Simon King	(England) Gillingham	Free
(Republic of Ireland) Philip Roberts	(England) Arsenal	Loan
(England) George Brislen-Hall	(England) Arsenal	Free
(England) Andre Blackman	(Scotland) Celtic	Loan
(Scotland) Matthew Cooper	(Scotland) Aberdeen	Free
(Republic of Ireland) Daniel Devine	(England) Fleetwood Town	Free
(England) Charlie Taylor	(England) Leeds United	Loan
(England) Jordan Gibbons	(England) Queens Park Rangers	Loan

=== Players out ===
Player	To	Fee
(Northern Ireland) Jonathan Tuffey	(Scotland) St Johnstone	Free
(England) Greg Tansey	(England) Stevenage	Free
(Scotland) David Proctor	(Canada) FC Edmonton	Free
(Austria) Thomas Piermayr	(Austria) SC Wiener Neustadt	Free
(Republic of Ireland) Jonny Hayes	(Scotland) Aberdeen	Free
(France) Grégory Tadé	(Scotland) St Johnstone	Free
(Scotland) Ross Tokely	(Scotland) Ross County	Free
(France) Kenny Gillet	(Cyprus) AEK Larnaca	Free
(Scotland) Andrew Greig	(Scotland) Brora Rangers	Free
(Scotland) Mark Noble	(Scotland) Fraserburgh	Free
(England) Jason Oswell		Free
(England) Andre Blackman	(Scotland) Celtic	Loan return
(England) George Brislen-Hall		Released
(Portugal) André Martins	(Brazil) Goiás	Free
(Scotland) Gavin Morrison	(Scotland) Elgin City	Loan
