= Ross Draper =

English footballer

Personal information
- Full name: Ross James Draper
- Date of birth: 20 October 1988 (age 38)
- Place of birth: Wolverhampton, England
- Height: 1.95 m (6 ft 5 in)
- Position: Central midfielder

Team information
- Current team: Brora Rangers
- Number: 23

Youth career
- –2006: Shrewsbury Town

Senior career*
Years	Team	Apps	(Gls)
2006–2007	Shrewsbury Town	0	(0)
2007–2008	Stafford Rangers	30	(0)
2008–2009	Hednesford Town	38	(5)
2009–2012	Macclesfield Town	97	(10)
2012–2017	Inverness Caledonian Thistle	170	(14)
2017–2021	Ross County	84	(3)
2021–2022	Cove Rangers	1	(0)
2021–2022	→ Elgin City (loan)	20	(0)
2022–2025	Elgin City	75	(6)
2025–	Brora Rangers	0	(0)

Managerial career
- 2023: Elgin City (player-manager)
- 2023: Elgin City (caretaker)
- * Club domestic league appearances and goals as of 02:04, 1 June 2025 (UTC)

Ross James Draper (born 20 October 1988) is an English football player and coach who plays for club Brora Rangers.

Draper, who plays as a central midfielder, has previously played for Shrewsbury Town, Stafford Rangers, Hednesford Town, Macclesfield Town, Inverness Caledonian Thistle, Ross County and Cove Rangers.

== Club career ==
=== Early career in England ===
Born in Wolverhampton, England, Draper started his football career at his boyhood club, Wolverhampton Wanderers and spent seven years there before being let go by the club, which he said it was tough. Draper then joined Shrewsbury Town as a trainee before being released by the club as well. Following this, he wrote to local clubs for a trial before being invited to Conference National club Stafford Rangers. His trial at Stafford Rangers was successful, leading Draper to sign for the club on 8 August 2007. However, he was playing for the club part time.

He made his debut for the club on 10 September 2007, in the 3–0 away defeat in the Conference National to Stevenage Borough. Despite facing suspension along the way, he made a total of 31 appearances during the 2007–08 season.

After leaving Stafford Rangers, Draper went on to join Northern Premier League Premier Division club Hednesford Town. He made 38 appearances and scoring five times for the side. Draper revealed he worked in a range of jobs while playing part-time, quoting: "When I was at Hednesford I had a job at Birmingham Midshires. I worked with mortgages then in administration before I moved into the collections department."

=== Macclesfield Town ===
On 9 July 2009, Draper transitioned to playing full time football when he signed for League Two side Macclesfield Town. Draper revealed he had offers from clubs in the Conference National, but wanted to play in the Football League instead. Upon doing so, Draper quit his full-time job to play professionally.

He made his debut for the club on 8 August 2009, in the 0–0 away draw against Northampton Town. Two weeks later on 22 August 2009, Draper scored his first goal for Macclesfield Town (and the Football League), in a 2–2 draw against Morecambe. Since joining the club, he became involved in the first team, playing in the midfield position. However, Draper suffered a hernia injury that kept him out for a month. On 13 February 2010, he made his return to the starting line–up, in a 0–0 draw against Accrington Stanley. However, in a match against Cheltenham Town on 27 March 2010, Draper suffered a hernia injury and was substituted in the 33rd minute, as Macclesfield Town won 1–0, in what turns out to be his last appearance of the season. While recovering from a hernia injury, he signed a two-year contract extension with the club. At the end of the 2009–10 season, Draper had made thirty–one appearances and scoring once in all competitions.

Draper made his first appearance of the 2010–11 season, in a 1–1 draw against Chesterfield on 28 August 2010. A month later on 25 September 2010, he scored his first goal of the season, in a 2–1 win against Torquay United. After missing one match due to a suspension, Draper scored on his return, in a 1–0 win against Bradford City on 20 November 2010. After missing another one match due to an injury, he scored on his return, in a 4–2 loss against Bury on 1 February 2011. A month later on 8 March 2011, Draper scored his fourth goal of the season from 20 yards, in a 1–0 win against Crewe Alexandra. On 30 April 2011, he scored his fifth goal of the season, in a 4–2 win against Gillingham. The new management under Gary Simpson – who had previously been Alexander's assistant at Lincoln City and Peterborough United, saw Draper become a first team regular, making forty–three appearances and scoring five times in all competitions.

At the start of the 2011–12 season, Draper attracted national news attention when he scored from close to the halfway line against Hereford United and Macclesfield Town went on to win 4–0. Afterwards, Draper conceded that he would never score another goal like it in his career. On 30 September 2011, Draper scored his second goal of the season, in a 2–0 win against Swindon Town. This was followed up by setting up an equalising goal for George Donnelly before he scored a winning goal, in a 2–1 win over Aldershot Town. After the match, manager Simpson expected Draper to score more goals for the club following the absence of Donnelly. Two weeks later on 22 October 2011, he scored his fourth goal of the season from a 25-yard strike, in a 1–0 win against Crewe Alexandra. Shortly after, Macclesfield Town opened contract extension negotiations with Draper. After serving a one match suspension, he returned to the starting line–up, in a 1–0 loss against Burton Albion on 5 November 2011. However, on 25 November 2011, Draper received a straight red card – for the first time in his Macclesfield Town's career – after a serious foul on Michael Hector in a 2–1 loss against Barnet. After the match, the club appealed his sending off. However, the FA rejected this appeal and confirmed his ban for three matches. After serving a three match suspension, he returned to the starting line–up, in a 1–0 loss against Shrewsbury Town on 17 December 2011. In the early part of the season, Draper had found some goalscoring form but this was halted when he sustained a fractured metatarsal during a 2–1 win over Port Vale and was out for four months. On 31 March 2012, Draper made his return from injury, coming on as a 67th-minute substitute, in a 2–0 loss against Gillingham. Following his return, he was unable to help Macclesfield Town avoid relegation, ending their fifteen consecutive seasons in the Football League following a 2–0 loss against Burton Albion on 28 April 2012. At the end of the 2011–12 season, Draper made thirty–two appearances and scoring four times in all competitions.

As a result, Macclesfield Town undertook a severe cost-cutting exercise and released twenty-one players, with Draper being the only incumbent player to be offered a new contract. During the subsequent negotiations, he reportedly attracted interest from other clubs 'wanting his signature'.

=== Inverness Caledonian Thistle ===
After rejecting a new contract at Macclesfield Town, Draper signed for Scottish Premier League club Inverness Caledonian Thistle on 6 July 2012, signing a one-year contract. His move to Scotland left manager Steve King upset, as it was ruled that there would be no compensation from Inverness.

==== 2012–13 season ====
Draper made his debut for Inverness Caledonian Thistle in the opening game of the season, starting the whole game, a 2–2 draw against St Mirren. Three weeks later, on 25 August 2012, he scored his first goals for his new club, netting twice – in only his second home appearance, during a 4–2 defeat by Celtic. On 5 October 2012, Draper played his first Highland derby match against Ross County, starting the whole game and scored in a 3–1 win. He set up two goals for Billy Mckay in two matches on 27 October 2012 and 3 November 2012 against St Johnstone and Kilmarnock respectively. However, Draper missed three matches, due to suffering from ankle injury.

Draper made his return from injury, coming on as a 60th-minute substitute, in a 3–2 win against Aberdeen on 27 November 2012. In a follow–up league match, he scored his fourth goal of the season, in a 3–0 win against Hibernian. Following his return from injury, Draper established himself in the first team, playing in central midfield position. On 8 March 2013, he, along with McKay, signed a contract extension with Inverness Caledonian Thistle. On 30 March 2013, Draper scored his fifth goal of the season, in a 2–1 win against Hibernian. Despite missing two matches later in the second half of the season, he made forty appearances and scoring five times in all competitions.

==== 2013–14 season ====
At the start of the 2013–14 season, Draper continued to establish himself in the first team, playing in the central midfield position. On 29 October 2013, he scored his first goal of the season against Dundee United in the quarter-final of the Scottish League Cup, which proved to be the winner to send Inverness Caledonian Thistle through to the semi-finals. However, in a derby match against Ross County on 1 January 2014, Draper received a red card for a second bookable offence, in a 2–1 loss. After serving a two match suspension, he returned to the first team, coming on as a 77th-minute substitute, in a 2–0 loss against Kilmarnock on 25 January 2014.

In a follow–up match against Hearts in the semi-final of the Scottish League Cup, Draper started the whole game and played throughout extra time, where he scored the winning penalty during the shoot-out to help the club reach the Scottish League Cup final. After the match, Draper revealed that manager John Hughes had organised mock shoot-outs ahead of the game. Following a 5–0 loss against Celtic on 3 March 2014, Draper spoke about the build-up, saying: We will just forget about this one. It's done, it's gone," said Ross Draper, the Inverness midfielder. "The League Cup final isn't in the back of our minds - not at all. It's not been spoken about in the changing room. So there's no problems with that. We are confident it will be a different outcome when we come back for the final." However, his return was short–lived when he was suspended for two matches.

After serving a two match suspension, Draper returned to the starting line–up in the final of the Scottish League Cup, where he expertly performed his role during the game, by effectively smothering Aberdeen in midfield, as the match ended scoreless, and after extra-time, Inverness Caledonian Thistle lost 4–2 on penalties. Despite his team losing, Draper was awarded the 'Man-of-the-Match' for his performance, which he grudgingly accepted the award, explaining: "It's nice to get an award like that to show the kids when I'm older but it doesn't mean a great deal at the moment after the way we were beaten. And maybe I didn't deserve it. I'll take it, but it means nothing without a winner's medal to back it up." On 19 March 2014, Draper signed a new two-year contract extension with Caley Thistle. Ten days later after signing a new contract, he scored his first league goal of the season, in a 2–2 draw against St Mirren on 29 March 2014. After missing one match due to a stomach bug, Draper made his return to the starting line–up, in a 0–0 draw against Aberdeen on 18 April 2014. At the end of the 2013–14 season, he made forty-one appearances and scoring two times in all competitions.

==== 2014–15 season ====
At the start of the 2014–15 season, Draper continued to establish himself in the first team, playing in the central midfield position. On 30 August 2014, he played in the centre–back position in absence of Josh Meekings and helped Inverness Caledonian Thistle kept a clean sheet, in a 2–0 win against Kilmarnock. His impressive early performances led to him receiving the award of SPFL Player of the Month for August. However, Draper faced disciplinary issues when he was booked on five occasions between September and November. This resulted in him being suspended on two occasions. In response, Draper insisted he wasn't a dirty player, saying: "I think it's down to the way people look at me because of my size and the way I go about my game. Sometimes tackles look a lot worse than they are". This led manager Hughes to defend him, saying: "Ross is such a big lad that sometimes it doesn't look like a foul but I'm right by him and the lads are going on him with some force. I think the refs just presume he's the one dishing out punishment. He doesn't get credit for how good a footballer he is. There are times when he takes on tackles, goes past players and then is getting fouled, but nothing is happening to the other player. Whereas if it was on the other foot, if he was doing it, he'd definitely be getting booked. It's very unfair." Draper also responded, saying he would not change his ways of playing.

However, in a match against St Johnstone on 20 December 2014, Draper received a straight red in the 67th minute when "he made a strong challenge for the ball on Simon Lappin and appeared to throw out his elbow", resulting in his sending off, as the club loss 1–0. After serving a two match suspension, Draper returned to the first team, coming on as a 79th-minute substitute for Aaron Doran, in a 1–1 draw against St Mirren on 4 January 2015. He expressed confident about Inverness Caledonian Thistle finishing at a record-best finish and European football, saying: "We do seem to be finding it hard of late. It is something we must work on. But it's not down to any one thing - sometimes you go through runs like this in a season. Thankfully, we have done enough to keep ourselves in third position and with the last few games approaching we just need to go again. They are all big games and ones where we believe we can pick up points."

He started the whole game and played 120 minutes to help the club beat Celtic 3–2 to reach their first ever Scottish Cup final. After making the final, Draper said he hoped Inverness Caledonian Thistle could do themselves justice, saying that he would have been happy to have thrown away his League Cup final man of the match award, such was his disappointment that day. Towards the end of the 2014–15 season, Draper, once again, was suspended for two matches due to accumulating ten yellow cards and was rested on the last game of the season. He started as a centre-midfielder in the Scottish Cup final, in a 2–1 win over Falkirk, resulting in the club winning the Scottish Cup for the first time. After the match, Draper expressed his delight at winning the trophy following the years of playing non-league football in England. At the end of the 2014–15 season, he made thirty-eight appearances in all competitions.

==== 2015–16 season ====
At the start of the 2015–16 season, Draper made his European football debut, playing in both legs against FC Astra Giurgiu in the UEFA Europa League second qualifying round, losing 1–0 on aggregate and Inverness Caledonian Thistle was eliminated in the tournament. He began to play in the centre–back position in absence of Gary Warren on four occasions. However, in a match against Kilmarnock on 17 October 2015, Draper suffered an injury and was substituted at half time, as the club loss 2–0. After missing three matches with ankle injury, he returned to the first team, coming on as a 76th-minute substitute, in a 2–1 loss against Partick Thistle on 21 November 2015. However, his return was short–lived when he missed two matches, due to ankle injury.

On 26 December 2015, Draper made his return from injury, starting the whole game, and set up two goals, in a 2–2 draw against Aberdeen. On 16 January 2016, he scored his first goal of the season (his first goal in over a year), in a 2–1 loss against Kilmarnock. Having discussed with the club over a new contract, Draper signed a new contract with Inverness Caledonian Thistle, keeping him until 2019. In a match against Aberdeen on 15 February 2016, he won a penalty after being fouled in the box despite little contact from Ash Taylor, which was successfully converted by Greg Tansey, in a 3–1 win. After the match, Aberdeen's manager Derek McInnes accused Draper of "buying" a penalty. In response to criticism, he called out McInnes by challenging him to come out and call him a cheat. On 27 February 2016, Draper scored his second goal of the season, in a 1–1 draw against Dundee.

After serving a one match suspension, he returned to the starting line–up, in a 1–0 loss against St Johnstone on 27 February 2016. Two weeks later on 19 March 2016, Draper scored his third goal of the season and set up one of the goals, in a 3–0 win against local rivals, Ross County. A month later on 24 April 2016, he, once again, scored his fourth goal of the season and set up one of the goals, in a 3–1 win against Kilmarnock. On the last game of the season, Draper scored his fifth goal of the season, in a 4–0 win against Dundee. At the end of the 2015–16 season, he made forty appearances and scoring five times in all competitions.

==== 2016–17 season ====
In the first game of the 2016–17 season, Draper scored his first goal of the season, in a 2–1 win against Cowdenbeath in the group stage of the Scottish League Cup. He then scored against Ross County, Hearts and St Johnstone on 13 August 2016, 20 August 2016 and 27 August 2016 respectively. Draper assisted against Aberdeen and Celtic on 9 September 2016 and 18 September 2016. During the match against Celtic, he subjected of a headline news after Erik Sviatchenko fouled him in the penalty box, which was not given and avoided suspension. Since the start of the 2016–17 season, he continued to establish himself in the first team, playing in the central midfield position. After a 3–0 win against Motherwell on 26 October 2016, manager Richie Foran praised his performance, calling him "an immense figure".

However, Inverness Caledonian Thistle's poor form and conceding goals led to the club finding themselves in the relegation zone. On 10 December 2016, Draper captained Inverness Caledonian Thistle for the first time in his career, in a 1–1 draw against Hamilton Academical. In the last 16 of the Scottish Cup against Celtic, he was fortunate to avoid a red card by fouling Scott Brown and was booked instead, as the club loss 6–0 and was eliminated from the tournament. Draper then captained Inverness Caledonian Thistle for the matches against Hearts and Rangers on 18 February 2017 and 24 February 2017 respectively. However, he missed one match due to accumulating five yellow cards during the 2016–17 season. But on 18 March 2017, Draper returned to the starting line–up, in a 1–1 draw against local rivals, Ross County. On the last game of the season, he started the match against Motherwell and despite winning 3–2, the club were relegated to the Scottish Championship. At the end of the 2016–17 season, Draper made forty–three appearances and scoring four times in all competitions.

Ahead of the 2017–18 season, Draper was linked with a move to local rivals, Ross County. Inverness Caledonian Thistle rejected a three bids from the Staggies for him. Amid to the transfer speculation, Draper played five times for the club, including being a captain for three matches. It was reported by The Inverness Courier that Draper informed Inverness Caledonian Thistle that he requested a transfer to leave the club. In response to the claim, Draper stated that Inverness Caledonian Thistle board members forced him to do a transfer request.

=== Ross County ===
Draper moved to Ross County on 9 August 2017 fee of around £100,000, signing a two–year contract.

He made his debut for the club, starting a match and played 73 minutes before being substituted, in a 2–1 loss against Aberdeen on 12 August 2017. After missing one match due to an injury during his Ross County's debut, Draper made his return, coming on as a 61st-minute substitute, in a 3–1 loss against Rangers on 27 August 2017. Since joining the club, he found himself fighting for his first team place in the midfield position, due to facing his own fitness concern. However, by the end of 2017, Draper was out on two separate occasions due to accumulating five yellow cards and his own injury concern. On 20 January 2018, he made his return from injury, starting the whole game, in a 1–0 loss against Kilmarnock in the fourth round of the Scottish Cup. However, Draper's return was short–lived once again when he was out for a month with an injury. On 10 March 2018, Draper returned to the starting line–up and set up Ross County's first goal of the game, in a 3–2 loss against Kilmarnock. After the match, he expressed his belief that the club can avoid relegation. After missing one match with an injury, Draper scored on his return from injury, in a 4–0 win against Partick Thistle on 3 April 2018. However, he experienced relegation for the second time in a row when the club's relegation from the Scottish Premiership was confirmed on 12 May 2018 following a 1–1 draw against St Johnstone, finishing bottom of the table. At the end of the 2017–18 season, Draper made twenty–nine appearances and scoring once in all competitions. On 21 May 2018, he signed a one–year contract with Ross County. Draper said he signed a contract with the club, determine to help the Staggies bounce back to the Scottish Premiership. However, Draper was unable to replicate his form at Ross County as he did at Inverness Caledonian Thistle.

At the start of the 2018–19 season, Draper appeared four times in the Scottish League Cup, as Ross County were eliminated in the second round of the tournament. He missed one match due to accumulating five yellow cards. On 11 August 2018, Draper set up two goals, in a 3–1 win against Dunfermline Athletic. He then began to play in the centre–back position alongside Callum Morris and Liam Fontaine. This caused him to rotate in playing either centre–back or midfield positions. In a match against Partick Thistle on 6 October 2018, Draper received a red card for a second bookable offence, as the club won 2–0. After serving a one match suspension, he returned to the starting line–up, in a 5–0 win against Greenock Morton on 27 October 2018. On 12 January 2019, Draper captained Ross County for the first time, in a 4–0 loss against Queen of the South. A month later on 15 February 2019, he helped the club reach the Scottish Challenge Cup final by beating East Fife 2–1. In a follow–up match against his former club Inverness Caledonian Thistle in the last 16 of the Scottish Cup replay, Draper scored in the shootout, as Ross County loss 5–4 and was eliminated from the tournament. However, he suffered ankle injury that kept him out for weeks. On 19 March 2019, Draper made his return to the starting line–up and played 53 minutes before being substituted, in a 1–0 loss against Dundee United. However, in the Scottish Challenge Cup final, he was dropped from the squad, as the club won 3–1 against Connah's Quay Nomads. In a match against his former club, Inverness Caledonian Thistle, on 2 April 2019, Draper suffered a knee injury and was substituted at half-time, as Ross County won 2–1. After the match, he was out of the rest of the 2018–19 season. During his absent, the club won promotion back to the Scottish Premiership after beating Queen of the South 4–0. At the end of the 2018–19 season, Draper made thirty–five appearances in all competitions. Following this, he signed a two–year contract extension with Ross County.

The start of the 2019–20 season saw Draper continuing to recover from his knee injury. On 10 August 2019, he made his return from injury, starting the whole game, in a 0–0 draw against Hearts. However, Draper's return was short–lived when he suffered a knee injury that kept him out for a month. On 5 October 2019, Draper made his return from injury, coming on as a 77th-minute substitute, in a 2–2 draw against St Johnstone. He started in the midfield position for the next four matches following his return from injury. However, Draper, once again, suffered a knee injury that kept him out for two months. On 29 January 2020, he made his return from injury, coming on as a 74th-minute substitute, in a 2–0 loss against Rangers. Draper made his first start against Livingston on 5 February 2020 and earned himself a man of the match by helping Ross County win 2–0. In a match against St Johnstone on 15 February 2020, he suffered an injury and was substituted at half–time, in a 1–1 draw. The season was curtailed because of the COVID-19 pandemic. At the end of the 2019–20 season, Draper made thirteen appearances in all competitions.

Ahead of the 2020–21 season, Draper continued to recover from a knee injury. On 3 August 2020, he made his return from injury, coming on as a late substitute, in a 1–0 win against Motherwell in the opening game of the season. Following his return, Draper started a number of matches, playing in the midfield position. On 12 August 2020, he scored his first goal of the season, in a 2–2 draw against Kilmarnock. However, Draper suffered a calf injury that saw him out for two matches. But on 4 October 2020, he made his return from injury, starting a match and played 73 minutes before being substituted, in a 2–0 loss against Rangers. However, his return was short–lived when he suffered a calf injury once again and was out for two months. On 16 December 2020, Draper made his return from injury, coming on as a 61st-minute substitute, in a 2–0 loss against Livingston in the quarter-finals of the Scottish League Cup. His return was short–lived when he was sent–off for a second bookable offence, in a 2–0 loss against St Mirren on 26 December 2020. After serving a one match suspension, Draper scored on his return, in a 1–1 draw against St Johnstone on 2 January 2021. Following his return from injury, he alternated between the starting line–up and substitute bench for the rest of the season, as Ross County avoided relegation. At the end of the 2020–21 season, Draper made twenty–two appearances and scoring two times in all competitions.

On 27 May 2021, Draper was released by Ross County along with nine other players.

=== Cove Rangers ===
On 23 June 2021, Draper signed a three-year contract with Scottish League One side Cove Rangers. Upon joining the club, he revealed that manager Paul Hartley went great lengths to sign him and tried to sign him before.

Draper made his Cove Rangers' debut, starting the whole game; although he did play in the centre–back position in the second-half, in a 3–2 loss against Stirling Albion in the group stage of the Scottish League Cup. Draper played twice in the centre–back position for the club, both in the Scottish League Cup. However, he suffered a knee injury that saw him never play for Cove Rangers again. By the time Draper left the club, he made five appearances in all competitions.

Following his return from a loan spell at Elgin City, Draper said he's open to make a return to Cove Rangers. However, Draper failed to feature in the first team under the new management of Jim McIntyre. On 31 August 2022, he was allowed to leave Cove Rangers at the end of the summer 2022 transfer window by mutual consent.

=== Elgin City ===
On 30 September 2021, Draper then joined Scottish League Two side Elgin City on loan until January 2022.

After not playing for two months, he made his debut for the club, starting a match and played 45 minutes before being substituted, in a 2–0 loss against Albion Rovers on 16 October 2021. However, his return was short–lived when Draper was in quarantine and did not play for a month. On 18 December 2021, he made his return to the starting line–up and played 55 minutes before being substituted, in a 2–2 draw against Stenhousemuir. Since returning from injury, Draper won his first team place at Elgin City, playing in the centre–back position with Kane O'Connor. On 14 January 2022, his loan spell at the club was extended for the remainder of the 2021–22 season. On 5 February 2022, he captained Elgin City for the first time, in a 4–0 loss against Kelty Hearts. However, Draper suffered an injury that saw him out for three matches. On 12 March 2022, he made his return from injury, coming on as a 50th-minute substitute, in a 2–1 loss against Annan Athletic. Draper started in the next three matches in the centre–back position by helping the club kept three clean sheets. At the end of the 2021–22 season, he made twenty appearances in all competitions. Following this, Draper returned to his parent club.

On 1 September 2022, Draper joined Elgin City on a permanent basis, signing a two–year contract. His first game after signing for the club on a permanent basis came on 3 September 2022 and kept a clean sheet, in a 2–0 win against Bonnyrigg Rose. Since joining Elgin City for the second time, Draper began playing in the centre–back position with Jake Dolzanski. His appearance also helped the club make a good start to the season, making eight league wins in the first half of the season. However, in a match against Stirling Albion on 23 December 2022, he received a straight red card for a foul on Dale Carrick in the 59th minute, in a 2–1 loss. After serving a one match suspension, Draper returned to the starting line–up, in a 2–1 loss against East Fife on 7 January 2023. Following his return from suspension, he continued to remain in the first team, rotating in either centre–back position and midfield position. Despite suffering a knock, Draper was fit for the match against Annan Athletic on 11 March 2023, only for him to be sent–off for a second bookable offence for handball, in a 4–1 loss. After serving a two match suspension, he returned to the starting line–up, in a 4 April 2023, in a 1–0 loss against Stirling Albion on 4 April 2023. On 29 April 2023, Draper scored his first goal for Elgin City, in a 1–0 win against Dumbarton. At the end of the 2022–23 season, he made thirty–four appearances and scoring once in all competitions.

At the start of the 2023–24 season, Draper continued to play in the centre–back position alongside Jake Dolzanski and Connall Ewan despite being an Elgin City's manager. On 30 September 2023, he played his first match since being replaced by Barry Smith against Peterhead and came on as a second–half substitute, in a 6–0 loss. After missing one match due to accumulating five yellow cards, Draper returned to the starting line–up, in a 2–1 win against Peterhead on 30 December 2023. On 13 January 2024, he scored his first goal of the season, in a 2–1 loss against Forfar Athletic. Draper then scored on 20 April 2014 and 27 April 2014 against Peterhead and Dumbarton respectively. Throughout the 2023–24 season, he continued to remain in the first team, playing in defender and midfield positions and helped the club avoid relegation. At the end of the 2023–24 season, Draper made thirty–five appearances and scoring three times in all competitions.

At the start of the 2024–25 season, Draper came on as a 66th-minute substitute against Kelty Hearts in the group stage of the Scottish League Cup and scored in the shootout, as Elgin City won 5–4. After serving a two match suspension, he returned to the starting line–up as captain in absence of Brian Cameron, in a 1–0 win against Stirling Albion on 10 August 2024. On 26 September 2024, Draper signed a one–year contract extension with the club. However, in a match against Edinburgh City on 28 September 2024, he received a red card for a second bookable offence, in a 3–3 draw. After serving a one match suspension, Draper came on as a 64th-minute substitute, in a 3–1 win against The Spartans on 19 October 2024. His return was short–lived when he suffered a muscle injury in the 9th minute against Clyde and was substituted, as Elgin City won 8–7 in a penalty shootout in the second round of the Scottish League Cup. After the match, Draper was out for three months. On 1 February 2025, he made his return from injury, coming on as a 85th-minute substitute, in a 1–0 win against East Fife. A week later on 8 February 2025, Draper scored his first goal of the season, in a 3–1 loss against Stirling Albion. Two weeks later on 22 February 2025, he scored his second goal of the season, in a 2–1 loss against Edinburgh City. However, his return was short–lived when Draper suffered an injury that saw him out for three matches. But on 15 March 2025, he made his return from injury, coming on as a late substitute, in a 2–0 win against Clyde. At the end of the 2024–25 season, Draper made twenty–four appearances and scoring two times in all competitions. At the start of the 2025–26 season, Draper set up Elgin City's first goal of the season, in a 5–1 loss against Raith Rovers in the group stage of the Scottish League Cup. However, he suffered an injury that saw him out for two matches. On 27 September 2025, Draper scored on his return from injury, in a 3–2 loss against The Spartans. By the time he left the club, Draper made ten appearances and scoring once in all competitions.

=== Brora Rangers ===
On 17 October 2025, Draper joined Highland Football League side Brora Rangers on a two–year contract.

== Managerial career ==
=== Elgin City ===
On 10 April 2023 following the sacking of manager Gavin Price, Draper was named a co-interim manager for the side alongside coaches Charlie Charlesworth and Stevie Dunn. Prior to this, he also began coaching for Ross County's U16 side.

On 25 May 2023, Draper was appointed manager of Elgin City on a three-year contract, while also continuing to remain as a player. His first match as manager of the club took place on 15 July 2023, in a 2–0 loss against Motherwell in the group stage of the Scottish League Cup. Elgin City's losses in the Scottish League Cup saw the club eliminated in the group stage. The results in the league was mixed, as Elgin City earned two points in the first five league matches.

Draper left the managerial position in early September 2023 when Barry Smith was appointed as the new manager of Elgin City. Despite this, Smith kept him as part of the club's coaching staff.

After Smith left Elgin City in November, Draper returned to his caretaker capacity at the club. He managed Elgin City, including a win against Forfar Athletic on 21 November 2023. Having ruled out a permanent return as a manager of the club, Draper vowed that he will assist new manager Allan Hale for a coaching role.

== Personal life ==
Growing up, Draper was a boyhood Wolverhampton Wanderers supporter.

Draper revealed that when he disclosed his previous occupation as a 'debt collector', his teammates had given him the nickname The Bailiff. Draper acknowledged the pain of playing artificial pitch but it's something he had to deal with. In February 2019, Draper said he's in favour of banning artificial pitches, due to suffer ankle injury four years ago. During the lockdown, Draper began trimming hair as a barber.

In November 2015, Draper became a first-time father when his Scottish partner gave birth to a baby boy. Both him and his partner were married and together, they have two sons.

== Career statistics ==
As of match played 5 April 2025

Appearances and goals by club, season and competitions
Club	Season	League			National Cup		League Cup		Other		Total	
Club	Season	Division	Apps	Goals	Apps	Goals	Apps	Goals	Apps	Goals	Apps	Goals
Stafford Rangers	2007–08	Conference Premier	30	0	0	0	—		0	0	30	0
Macclesfield Town	2009–10	EFL League Two	29	1	1	0	1	0	0	0	31	1
Macclesfield Town	2010–11	EFL League Two	40	5	3	0	0	0	0	0	43	5
Macclesfield Town	2011–12	EFL League Two	28	4	1	0	2	0	1 (Note: Appearance in the Football League Trophy)	0	32	4
Macclesfield Town	Total		97	10	5	0	3	0	1	0	106	10
Inverness Caledonian Thistle	2012–13	Scottish Premier League	34	5	2	0	4	0	—		40	5
Inverness Caledonian Thistle	2013–14	Scottish Premiership	34	1	3	0	4	1	—		41	2
Inverness Caledonian Thistle	2014–15	Scottish Premiership	32	0	6	0	0	0	—		38	0
Inverness Caledonian Thistle	2015–16	Scottish Premiership	32	5	5	0	1	0	1 (Note: Appearance in the Europa League)	0	39	5
Inverness Caledonian Thistle	2016–17	Scottish Premiership	37	3	1	0	5	1	—		43	4
Inverness Caledonian Thistle	2017–18	Scottish Championship	1	0	0	0	4	0	0	0	5	0
Inverness Caledonian Thistle	Total		170	14	17	0	18	2	1	0	206	16
Ross County	2017–18	Scottish Premiership	28	1	1	0	0	0	—		29	1
Ross County	2018–19	Scottish Championship	24	0	3	0	4	0	4 (Note: Appearances in the Scottish Challenge Cup)	0	35	0
Ross County	2019–20	Scottish Premiership	11	0	0	0	1	0	—		12	0
Ross County	2020–21	Scottish Premiership	21	2	0	0	1	0	—		22	2
Ross County	Total		84	3	4	0	6	0	4	0	98	3
Cove Rangers	2021–22	Scottish League One	1	0	0	0	4	0	0	0	5	0
Elgin City (loan)	2021–22	Scottish League Two	20	0	0	0	0	0	0	0	20	0
Elgin City	2022–23	Scottish League Two	28	1	4	0	0	0	2	0	34	1
Elgin City	2023–24	Scottish League Two	30	3	1	0	4	0	1	0	36	3
Elgin City	2024–25	Scottish League Two	17	2	1	0	4	0	2	0	24	2
Elgin City	Total		75	6	6	0	8	0	5	0	94	6
Career total			477	33	31	0	39	2	11	0	599	35

=== Managerial record ===
As of match played 21 November 2023

Managerial record by team and tenure
Team	From	To	Record					Ref
Team	From	To	P	W	D	L	Win %	Ref
Elgin City	May 2023	September 2023	11	1	3	7	9.1	
Elgin City (caretaker)	November 2023	December 2023	2	1	0	1	50.0	
Total			13	2	3	8	15.4	

== Honours ==
=== Club ===
Inverness Caledonian Thistle

- Scottish Cup : 2014–15

Ross County

- Scottish Championship: 2018–19
- Scottish Challenge Cup: 2018–19

=== Individual ===
SPFL Player of the Month: August 2014
