= Gary Warren (footballer) =

English footballer (born 1984)

Personal information
- Full name: Gary Robert Warren
- Date of birth: 16 August 1984 (age 42)
- Place of birth: Bristol, England
- Height: 6 ft 2 in (1.88 m)
- Position: Defender

Senior career*
Years	Team	Apps	(Gls)
2002–2006	Mangotsfield United	164	(11)
2006–2009	Team Bath	111	(8)
2009–2012	Newport County	113	(14)
2012–2018	Inverness Caledonian Thistle	181	(13)
2018–2019	Yeovil Town	26	(0)
2019–2020	Exeter City	1	(0)
2020	→ Torquay United (loan)	3	(0)
2020–2021	Torquay United	19	(1)
2021–2022	Tiverton Town	39	(4)
2022–2023	Clachnacuddin	27	(1)
- * Club domestic league appearances and goals as of 21:09, 15 April 2022 (UTC)

Gary Robert Warren (born 16 August 1984) is a retired English footballer who played as a defender. He was a stalwart for Inverness Caledonian Thistle during seven seasons, establishing himself as a club legend. After ending his professional football career, Warren became a Head of Professional Academy at Scottish Premiership club Ross County. He returned to England to join Weston-super-Mare as the Head of Academy and Recruitment.

== Club career ==
=== Mangotsfield United ===
Born in Bristol, England, Warren's football career began at Mangotsfield United in the Southern League, where he rose up through the youth & reserve ranks to the first team. Warren made his debut for Mangotsfield United away to Evesham United on 1 April 2003. He quickly became a first team regular at the club for whom he played between 2002 and 2006.

Warren played a pivotal role in the team's 2004–2005 Southern League – Western Division championship-winning side. For his performance, he was named Mangotsfield United's player-of-the-year by the club's supporters. His performance throughout the 2005–06 season saw him linked a move away from Mangotsfield United, with the club rejecting two bids for him. On 30 September 2006, Warren signed a contract with Mangotsfield United. He then became a captain for the side along the way. His career record with Mangotsfield totalled 164 appearances with 11 goals.

=== Team Bath ===
In the summer transfer window of 2006, Warren went on trial at Bristol Rovers, with a view to permanent contract and even played a friendly match against Mangotsfield United. However, manager Paul Trollope opted to sign Byron Anthony over him and he eventually opted to join Team Bath.

Warren quickly became a first team regular for the club and captained the side during his time there. Warren captained Team Bath to play-off promotion and played a pivotal part in the university's rise to conference football. Team Bath folded in his last year and Warren then joined Newport County after interest from a number of clubs including Hereford United.

=== Newport County ===
On 1 June 2009, following the disbandment of Team Bath, Warren signed for Newport County, then in the Conference South. The club tried to sign him two years ago but the move never happen, due to they had to pay a transfer fee to Team Bath, as he was under 24.

==== 2009–10 season ====
Warren made his debut for Newport County, in a friendly match against Mansfield Town on 19 July 2009. He made his league debut for the club, starting the whole game, in a 0–0 draw against Bishop's Stortford in the opening game of the season. In a follow–up match against Hampton & Richmond Borough, Warren played in the right–back position. He captained Newport County for the first time, in a 0–0 draw against Dorchester Town on 18 August 2009. Since joining the club, Warren was immediately a regular for Newport County, forming a centre–back partnership with Aaron Cook. At times, he played in the right–back position in absence of Paul Bignot. On 29 August 2009, Warren scored his first goal for the club, in a 3–1 win against Maidenhead United.

However, he suffered a groin injury and stomach strain that saw him out for five matches. On 9 November 2009, Warren returned from injury, starting the whole game, in a 2–1 win against Dover Athletic. After the match, manager Dean Holdsworth praised his performance, saying: "He's immense, I could talk about him all day, he's fantastic, and it's difficult to pick one out, one and all it was a brilliant performance." Due to the absence of Cook from the starting eleven, Warren was appointed captain for Newport County. Following his return from injury, he continued to regain his first team place, forming a centre–back position with Alton Thelwell and Paul Cochlin.

On 9 December 2009, Warren scored his second goal for Newport County, in a 5–0 win against Thurrock. On 16 December 2009, he signed a contract extension with the club, keeping him until 2012. On 29 December 2009, Warren scored his third goal of the season, in a 3–0 win against Dorchester Town. On 23 January 2010, he scored his fourth goal of the season, in a 5–0 win against St Albans City. However in a 4–0 win against Hampton & Richmond on 20 February 2010, Warren suffered a knee injury, resulting in his substitution in the 48th minute and did not play throughout February. On 3 March 2010, he made his return from injury, starting the whole game as captain, in a 5–1 win against Basingstoke Town. On 15 March 2010, Warren led the club to beat Havant & Waterlooville 2–0 at Newport Stadium with seven league games remaining to seal their promotion to Conference Premier. In a follow–up match, he scored his fifth goal of the season, in a 2–1 loss against Thurrock.

However, Warren suffered a groin injury that required a surgery once the season was concluded. But he returned to the starting line–up as captain, in a 4–1 win against Maidenhead United on 3 April 2010. His recurring injury that saw him out briefly. On 17 April 2010, Warren returned to the starting line–up, in a 3–0 win against Dover Athletic. He led Newport County crown as Conference South champions with a record 103 points, 28 points ahead of second-placed Dover Athletic. At the end of the 2009–10 season, Warren made forty–one appearances and scoring five times in all competitions. For his performances, he was handed the Conference South player of the year and selected as Newport County's Player of the Year for the 2009–10 season. Warren was also named the Conference South Team of the Year.

==== 2010–11 season ====
At the start of the 2010–11 season, however, Warren suffered a groin injury that could see him out for a while. But he recovered in time and started the whole game, in a 1–0 loss against Darlington in the opening game of the season. Warren continued to remain in the first team, playing in the centre–back position with Chris Todd. He also continued to retain his captaincy as Newport County along the way.

On 21 September 2010, Warren scored his first goal of the season, in a 2–1 win against Hayes & Yeading United. In a match against Eastbourne Borough on 5 October 2010, however, he was sent–off in the 7th minute, for giving a penalty, in a 3–3 draw against Eastbourne Borough. After serving a one match suspension, Warren returned to the starting line–up, in a 3–2 win against Crawley Town on 16 October 2010. On 6 November 2010, Warren scored his second goal of the season, in a 2–1 loss against Barrow. After missing one match due to an injury, he returned to the first team, coming on as an 83rd-minute substitute, in a 2–0 win against Southport on 20 November 2010. However, in a match against Southport on 8 January 2011, Warren suffered a concussion and was substituted at half-time, as Newport County loss 2–1. In a follow–up match against Tamworth, he received a straight red card at the last minute of the game, as the club loss 3–2. After serving a four match suspension, Warren returned to the starting line–up, in a 1–1 draw against Luton Town on 18 February 2011.

Initially, Warren lost his place due to the form of Todd and Jamie Collins. He slowly regained his first team place, playing in the right–back position before returning back to playing in the centre–back position. On 26 February 2011, Warren scored an own-goal, in a 2–0 loss against Kettering Town. He scored against Fleetwood Town and Altrincham on 5 March 2011 and 12 March 2011 respectively. Warren scored against Barrow and Altrincham on 16 April 2011 and 23 April 2011, putting his tally to six goals this season. At the end of the 2010–11 season, he made forty–four appearances and scoring six times in all competitions.

Warren acknowledged that the departure of Dean Holdsworth led Newport County failing to earn a spot in the playoffs. He was linked with a move to a number of clubs including Blackpool, then managed by Ian Holloway and also a £10k move to League Two side Cheltenham Town. This bid was rejected, with manager Anthony Hudson criticising Cheltenham Town for their offer, describing it as an 'insult'. Hudson also insisted Newport County had no plans to sell Warren.

==== 2011–12 season ====
Ahead of the 2011–12 season, Newport County revealed that Warren is one of several players committed at the club, with their aim for promotion to League Two. On 6 July 2011, he stayed on at the club for another season. Warren missed the first four league matches, due to international commitment. On 27 August 2011, he made his first appearance of the season, starting the whole game, in a 2–1 loss against Telford United. In a follow–up match against Kidderminster Harriers, however, Warren received a straight red card in the 37th minute for a foul on Steve Guinan, as the club loss 3–1. But he returned to the starting line–up, in a 1–0 loss against Cambridge United.

Since returning from his international commitment, Warren continued to regain his first team place, playing in the centre–back position with Ismail Yakubu and Wayne Hatswell, as well as, regaining his captaincy. However, he suffered a back injury that had been recurring since late–October and did not play for three matches. On 29 November 2011, Warren made his return to the starting line–up and set up a goal for Yakubu, who went on to score twice, in a 4–0 win against Hayes & Yeading United. After the match, manager Justin Edinburgh praised his performance, saying: "He came in and did fantastic. I feel slightly for Hats because he hasn't put a foot wrong but with the games coming as quick as they are at the moment I felt he needed a rest. Gary is an influential figure and he's a winner." On 6 December 2011, he scored his first goal of the season, in a 3–2 loss against Alfreton Town.

Prior to the match against Bath City on 3 January 2012, Warren said the match must be a win game for Newport County. When the match took place, he went on to score his second goal of the season, in a 3–2 loss. After the match, Warren said: "We conceded a goal after 40 seconds of the second half and we had a mountain to climb then. It's very disappointing. We let ourselves down." However, in a match against Mansfield Town on 18 February 2012, he suffered a hamstring injury and was substituted at half-time, as the club won 1–0. After missing two matches, Warren returned to the starting line–up, in a 1–1 draw against Southport on 3 March 2012. In a follow–up match against Braintree Town, he scored his third goal of the season, in a 4–3 loss. In a match against Cambridge United on 20 March 2012, however, Warren suffered ankle injury and was substituted in the 68th minute, as the match ended in a 1–1 draw. After missing one match, he made his return to the starting line–up, in a 1–0 win against Gateshead on 31 March 2012.

However, his return was short lived when Warren suffered ankle injury that saw him out for three matches. After missing two matches, he made his return to the starting line–up, in a 0–0 draw against Darlington on 17 April 2012. In the last game of the season against Barrow, Warren suffered a hamstring injury and was substituted in the 52nd minute, as Newport County loss 3–1. But he recovered from his injury. On 12 May 2012, Warren played for the club in the FA Trophy Final at Wembley Stadium – a match they lost 2–0 to York City. At the end of the 2011–12 season, he made forty–three appearances and scoring three times in all competitions.

=== Inverness Caledonian Thistle ===
With his contract at Newport County expiring at the end of 2011–12 season, Warren acknowledged that his future at the club was uncertain. On 17 May 2012, Newport County offered him a new contract with the club. It was announced on 3 June 2012 that he would be leaving Newport County. On 20 June 2012, Warren chose to move on to Scottish Premier League side Inverness Caledonian Thistle. Upon joining the club, Warren said he signed for Inverness Caledonian Thistle because he 'couldn't say no' to playing under manager Terry Butcher. His departure from Newport County resulted in an end-of-an-era as Warren was the last of Dean Holdsworth's team to depart.

==== 2012–13 season ====
Warren made his debut for the club, starting the whole game, in a 2–2 draw against St Mirren in the opening game of the season. Since joining Inverness Caledonian Thistle, he quickly became a first team regular, forming a centre–back partnership with Josh Meekings. Warren later stated that the club's target was to win the Scottish League Cup this season, a target he failed to fulfill.

Warren set up goals against Hibernian and Dundee United on 22 September 2012 and 29 September 2012 respectively. On 19 October 2012, he scored his first goal for Inverness Caledonian Thistle, in a 4–1 win against Dundee. Two weeks later on 31 October 2012, Warren started the match against Rangers in the quarter-finals of the 2012–13 Scottish League Cup and scored his second goal for the club, in a 3–0 win. On 24 November 2012, he also started the match and helped Inverness Caledonian Thistle keep a clean sheet, in a 1–0 win away against Celtic. In a follow–up match against Aberdeen, Warren scored his third goal of the season, in a 3–2 win. Two weeks later on 15 December 2012, he scored his fourth goal of the season, in a 4–4 thriller against Dundee United. In the first part of the season, Warren and his teammates struggled as the club found themselves near the foot of the table, but he believed that the fans will soon begin to see the best of him.

However, by December, Warren said his future in Scotland was uncertain due to personal issues. Despite this, he continued to reman in the first team for Inverness Caledonian Thistle. However, Warren's target to win the Scottish League Cup failed when the club loss against Heart of Midlothian 5–4 on penalties following a 1–1 draw. On 23 February 2013, he scored a brace, in a 3–2 win against Hearts. After a serving a one match suspension, Warren returned to the starting line–up, in a 0–0 draw against local rivals, Ross County on 2 March 2013. Four days later on 6 March 2013, he signed a new two-year contract extension with Inverness Caledonian Thistle.

However, Warren suffered a knee injury that saw him out for six weeks. On 20 April 2013, he returned to the starting line–up against Celtic, only for him to be substituted in the 50th minute, as the club lost 4–1, in what turned out to be his last appearance of the season. At the end of the 2012–13 season, Warren made thirty–eight appearances and scoring six times in all competitions.

==== 2013–14 season ====
Warren helped Inverness Caledonian Thistle keep a clean sheet in the first three league matches of the 2013–14 season, alongside Meekings in the centre–back and new goalkeeper Dean Brill. He spoken out about settling in Scotland and hope to stay at the club beyond his current contract. Since the start of the season, Warren regained his first team place, playing in the centre–back position with Meekings.

However, he suffered a knock in late–September that saw him out for one match. On 28 September 2013, Warren returned to the starting line–up, and helped the club keep a clean sheet, in a 3–0 win against Hibernian. He then scored against Partick Thistle and against Dundee United in the quarter-final of the Scottish League Cup on 20 October 2013 and 29 October 2013 respectively. Warren, once again, helped Inverness Caledonian Thistle keep five clean sheets in all competitions between 9 November 2013 and 14 December 2013.

After missing one match due to injury, Warren returned to the starting line–up, in a 2–0 loss against Kilmarnock on 25 January 2014. In a match against Heart of Midlothian in the semi-final of the Scottish League Cup, however, he was sent–off for the second bookable offence, as the club went on to win 4–2 in the penalty shootout to reach the Scottish League Cup final. After the match, it was announced that Warren would miss the final. He, once again, helped Inverness Caledonian Thistle keep four clean sheets in all competitions between 15 February 2014 and 25 February 2014. On 22 February 2014, Warren scored his third goal of the season, in a 1–0 win against St Johnstone, giving the club their first victory in Perth in three years.

Warren watched from the sidelines in the Scottish League Cup Final against Aberdeen, as Inverness Caledonian Thistle lost 4–2 in the penalty shoot-out. After serving a one match suspension, he made his return to the starting line–up, in a 1–0 win against Partick Thistle on 22 March 2014. On 18 April 2014, Warren captained the club for the first time, in a 0–0 draw against Aberdeen. However, he suffered a knee injury that saw him out for one match. On 7 May 2014, Warren made his return to the starting line–up, only for him to score an own goal, in a 2–1 loss against Motherwell. At the end of the 2013–14 season, he made forty–one appearances and scoring three times in all competitions.

On 19 May 2014, Warren signed a further contract extension, committing himself to the club until 2017. Reflecting in his second season at Inverness Caledonian Thistle, he expressed his disappointment on missing out in playing in Europe and acknowledged the improvement by reaching a final and finishing in the top-six. Warren also revealed the club's target is by winning a trophy next season.

==== 2014–15 season ====
At the start of the 2014–15 season, Warren started the season well when he helped Inverness Caledonian Thistle keep four clean sheets out of the first five league matches of the season and earned the club 13 points in the first six matches. However, Warren missed one match, due to an injury. On 13 September 2014, he returned to the starting line–up, in a 3–1 loss against Partick Thistle. In a follow–up match against Rangers in the second round of the Scottish League Cup, Warren had a late–goal disallowed, due to offside as the club loss 1–0 and was eliminated from the tournament. After the match, he said the match was frustrating.

Since returning from injury, he continued to regain his first team place, forming a centre–back partnership with Meekings. Following Inverness Caledonian Thistle's good start to the season, Warren praised John Hughes’ management and his total football tactic, saying it made him a better player. Hughes praised his performance in return for his display against St Mirren on 18 October 2014. Two weeks later on 8 November 2014, he scored his first goal of the season, in a 4–2 win over Hamilton Academical. A month later on 2 December 2014, Warren scored his second goal of the season, in a 4–1 win against St Mirren in the fourth round replay Scottish Cup. On 31 January 2015, however, he scored an own-goal against local rivals, Ross County to give the opposition team an equaliser goal, as the match ended in a 1–1 draw. Warren reiterated the club's target by qualifying for European football next season. On 24 February 2015, he was sent-off in the last minute of the match against Dundee United after being involved in an incident with Nadir Çiftçi, as the match ended in a 1–1 draw. After the match, Warren served a two match suspension.

On 21 March 2015, he returned to the starting line–up, in a 1–0 loss against Partick Thistle. After the match, manager Hughes praised Warren's performance on his return from suspension, saying he deserves to win the Inverness Caledonian Thistle's player of the year. Warren helped the club beat Celtic 3–2 in the semi-final of the Scottish Cup to reach the final. Unfortunately, he was suspended for the final after picking-up a caution during the match. After the match, Warren expressed his disappointment that he would be unable to play in a final again, though he accepted the decision. Despite this, Warren assisted a goal for Meekings to score an opener before scoring the third goal of the game himself, in a 3–0 win over Dundee United on 16 May 2015. Once again, he watched from the sidelines, as Inverness Caledonian Thistle won 2–1 against Falkirk to win the final for the first time. However, Warren did not receive the winner's medal, due to not being in the squad. Nevertheless, he celebrated with his teammates and lifted the trophy. At the end of the 2014–15 season, Warren made forty-one appearances and scoring three times in all competitions.

==== 2015–16 season ====
At the start of the 2015–16 season, Warren stated that he's looking forward to play in Europe and "determined his continental adventure will not be one and gone". Warren made his European football debut, captaining in both legs against FC Astra Giurgiu in the UEFA Europa League second qualifying round, losing 1–0 on aggregate and Inverness Caledonian Thistle was eliminated in the tournament. He stated that the club's aim was to stay and finish in the top-six in the league. However in the opening game of the 2015–16 season against Motherwell, Warren suffered a leg injury and was substituted in the 43rd minute, as the club loss 1–0. After the match, he was rushed to the hospital and had surgery on his leg. Afterwards, it was announced that Warren would be out between six to eight weeks.

On 31 October 2015, he made his return from injury, coming on as an 80th-minute substitute, in a 1–1 draw against Dundee. After the match, Warren said he was happy to be back on the pitch. On 29 November 2015, Warren made his first start for Inverness Caledonian Thistle in three months, in a 3–1 loss against Celtic. Since returning from injury, he regained his first team place, playing in the centre–back position with Meekings and Danny Devine. He also continued to remain as the club's captain, especially in absence of Richie Foran.

On 23 January 2016, Warren signed a three–year contract extension with Inverness Caledonian Thistle, keeping him until 2019. During a match against Celtic on 20 February 2016, he "headed wide with an open goal at his mercy after Hoops goalkeeper Craig Gordon misjudged an Iain Vigurs free kick", as the club loss 3–0. After the match, Warren acknowledged that the match cost him a victory for Inverness Caledonian Thistle. However in a match against St Johnstone on 9 March 2016, he received a red card for a second bookable offence, as Inverness Caledonian Thistle loss 1–0. After serving a one match suspension, Warren returned to the starting line–up, against Hibernian in the Scottish Cup quarter-finals replay, as the club loss 2–1 and was eliminated from the tournament. However, he failed to meet Inverness Caledonian Thistle's target when the club failed to finish in the top-six and finished in seventh place instead. At the end of the 2015–16 season, Warren made thirty–two appearances in all competitions.

==== 2016–17 season ====
Ahead of the 2016–17 season, Warren said he expected the league to be tougher following Rangers’ return and warned Inverness Caledonian Thistle not to get left behind. In the first game of the 2016–17 season, Warren scored his first goal of the season, in a 2–1 win against Cowdenbeath in the group stage of the Scottish League Cup. Since the start of the season, he continued to regain his first team place in the centre–back position with Meekings. Warren also continued to remain as the club's captain.

However, in a match against St Johnstone on 3 December 2016, he was sent–off for a second bookable offence in the space of two minutes, in a 3–0 loss. After serving a one match suspension, Warren scored his second goal of the season, in a 1–1 draw against Kilmarnock on 17 December 2016. With Inverness Caledonian Thistle bottom in the table, he called on players to toughen up. After missing two matches due to accumulating five yellow cards, Warren returned to the starting line–up, in a 4–0 loss against Celtic on 1 March 2017. He later responded to criticism on his performance, saying: "I know what people say: ‘he's 32, his legs have gone and he's past it’. Sometimes you suffer dips in your own form. It's not been the best of seasons – we're down at the bottom of the table. You can butter it up how you want but for me personally, it's not been one of my best seasons. Whenever a player gets the other side of 30, it's the excuse everyone looks for. ‘His legs have gone and he can't cope with the pace of the game’, which is a load of rubbish. I've never had pace in my career, so if that's what people say, how can I lose pace I've never had? I get frustrated because I'm captain and I want to see the best for the club, building on previous seasons. That's what hurts for me this year. I'm probably trying to do too much, rather than concentrating on my own job. The performances haven't been as well as I would have liked. But my character has always been the same. You go through patches where you're not at your best; you don't lose ability overnight. It's just a loss of form for a part of the season."

In a follow–up match, Warren scored his third goal of the season, in a 1–1 draw against Partick Thistle. On 4 April 2017, he scored an own-goal to score the only goal of the game against Aberdeen. After the match, Warren said he hope "the fear of failure" inspiration can motivate teammates to help the club avoid relegation. In a follow–up match against St Johnstone, Warren was sent–off for the second time this season after receiving a straight red card in the last minute for dissent, as Inverness Caledonian Thistle loss 3–0. After serving a two match suspension, he returned to the starting line–up, in a 2–1 win against Hamilton Academical on 6 May 2017. After the match, he said: ‘’’"We can only go up now. We can only jump places and try to catch teams in front of us. It's like the pressure is a little bit off us because everyone expects us now to be finished and we're all doom and gloom. We need to keep playing for our futures. That's what we're here for. We're also playing for our livelihoods."’’ In the last game of the season, Warren started the match against Motherwell and despite winning 3–2, the club were relegated to the Scottish Championship. At the end of the 2016–17 season, he made forty appearances and scoring three times in all competitions.

==== 2017–18 season ====
Ahead of the 2017–18 season, Warren said he wanted to forget the 2016–17 season that resulted in Inverness Caledonian Thistle relegated. Warren scored twice, in a 3–0 win against Brechin City in the group stage of the Scottish League Cup. However, he soon suffered ankle injury that kept him out for weeks. On 19 August 2017, Warren scored on his return from injury, in a 1–1 draw against Greenock Morton. After suffering from another ankle injury, he returned to the starting line–up, in a 4–2 loss against St Mirren on 9 September 2017. On 23 September 2017, Warren was sent–off for a second bookable offence, in a 2–1 loss against Dumbarton. After not playing in the first team for a month, he returned as a late substitute, in a 1–0 win against Dunfermline Athletic on 28 October 2017.

Following this, Warren found himself placed on the substitute bench for the rest of the year. In the second half of the season, he soon regained his first team place, playing in the centre–back position, as well as, captain. On 18 February 2018, Warren started the whole game as captain and helped Inverness Caledonian Thistle beat Crusaders 3–2 to reach the Scottish Challenge Cup final. Having been suspended for both the Scottish League Cup and Scottish Cup finals, he was finally able to play in his first cup final, captaining the club in the Challenge Cup final against Dumbarton. Warren put in a solid performance as the Inverness Caledonian Thistle won 1–0 and he was able to lift the cup as the club's captain.

On 31 March 2018, Warren scored his third goal of the season, in a 2–2 draw against St Mirren. In a match against Dumbarton on 18 April 2018, he suffered a calf injury and was substituted in the 25th minute, as the Inverness Caledonian Thistle won 1–0, in what turned out to be his last appearance for the club. After the match, Warren did not play for the rest of the season. At the end of the 2017–18 season, he made twenty–eight appearances and scoring three times in all competitions. Warren was informed that Inverness Caledonian Thistle may not be able to keep him, as his wages were too high and the club had to cut back on costs after a reduced parachute payment after their failed attempt in promotion back to top flight. His exit was not instantaneous, as he was told he could stay on if no club came forward for him.

=== Yeovil Town ===
On 28 June 2018, Warren's contract with Inverness was terminated by mutual consent to allow him to join League Two side Yeovil Town on a free transfer. Upon joining the club, he was given a number four shirt ahead of the new season.

Warren made his debut for Yeovil Town, coming on as a 55th-minute substitute, in a 1–0 loss against Bury in the opening game of the season. He helped the club keep five clean sheets in the league between 17 August 2018 and 15 September 2018. However, Warren suffered an injury that saw him out for five matches. On 20 October 2018, he returned to the starting line–up as captain against Tranmere Rovers, as the match ended in a 0–0 draw.

However, his return was short–lived when Warren suffered a groin injury and was out for three matches. On 24 November 2018, he returned to the starting line–up but had his first goal for Yeovil Town disallowed, in a 1–0 loss against Macclesfield Town. After the match, Warren regained his first team place, playing in the centre–back position and captained a number of matches for the club. After missing one match with a groin injury, he returned to the starting line–up, in a 1–0 loss against Cheltenham Town on 5 February 2019. His return was short–lived when Warren suffered a hamstring injury and was out for a month. On 23 March 2019, he returned to the starting line–up, in a 2–0 loss against Milton Keynes Dons. Warren suffered an injury for the fifth time this season and was out for the rest of the season; Yeovil Town were eventually relegated to the National League. At the end of the 2018–19 season, he made twenty–eight appearances in all competitions.

On 26 June 2019, after a campaign disrupted by injury, Warren left Yeovil Town after having his contract terminated by mutual consent.

=== Exeter City ===
On 28 June 2019, Warren joined League Two side Exeter City on a free transfer. Upon joining the club, he was given a number sixteen shirt.

Warren made his debut for Exeter City, coming on as a late substitute, in a 1–0 win against Macclesfield Town in the opening game of the season. However, he found his first team opportunities at the club limited, due to competitions from Aaron Martin and Tom Parkes in the centre–back position, as well as, his own injury concern.

After being recalled by Exeter City, Warren started in the EFL Trophy semi-final against Portsmouth, losing 3–2. Following the match, manager Matt Taylor said Warren's performance could see him get first team action at the club. However, this was interrupted by the COVID-19 pandemic in the United Kingdom, resulting in the season being curtailed. At the end of the 2019–20 season, he was released by Exeter City.

=== Torquay United ===
On 9 January 2020, Warren joined Torquay United on loan from Exeter City.

On 11 January 2020, he made his debut for the club, starting the whole game, in a 2–1 loss against FC Halifax Town. Warren made three more starts for Torquay United. He was recalled by Exeter City on 10 February 2020 and made four appearances for the side. On 28 July 2020, Warren signed for Torquay United on a free transfer.

However, he suffered an injury that saw him out for the first two league matches. Warren's first game after signing for the club on a permanent basis came on 10 October 2020, coming on as a 73rd-minute substitute, in a 2–1 win against Bromley. On 31 October 2020, he scored his first Torquay United goal, in a 5–0 win against Hartlepool United. However, his time at the club was plagued by injuries throughout the 2020–21 season. At the end of the 2020–21 season, Warren made fourteen appearances and scoring once in all competitions. On 23 June 2021, he was released by the club.

=== Tiverton Town ===
On 6 July 2021, Warren joined Southern Football League Premier Division South club Tiverton Town, already at the club as manager of Under-18s.

He made his debut for the club, starting the whole game, in a 0–0 draw against Chesham United. Warren went on to score four goals throughout the 2021–22 season. Despite occasionally being absent from injuries, he went on to make thirty–eight appearances and scoring four times in all competitions.

Warren left both of his roles at the club in June 2022 to move back to Scotland.

=== Clachnacuddin ===
On 19 June 2022, Warren returned to Inverness, and signed for Highland League side, Clachnacuddin on a one-year deal.

After missing the opening game of the season with an injury, he made his debut for the club, starting the whole game, in a 1–0 win against Huntly. On 1 October 2022, Warren started in the North of Scotland Cup final against Brora Rangers, as Clachnacuddin loss 2–1. Since joining the club, he became a first team regular, playing in the centre–back position. On 13 November 2022, Warren received a straight red card for a foul, in a 4–0 loss against Turriff United in the last 16 of the Highland League Cup. On 15 January 2023, he signed a one–year contract extension with Clachnacuddin. On 4 March 2023, Warren scored his first goal for the club, in a 2–1 win against Keith. At the end of the 2022–23 season, he made twenty–three appearances and scoring once in all competitions. For his performances, Warren was awarded Clachnacuddin's Player of the Year.

However, in the 2023–24 season, Warren suffered an injury during a match against Keith. Shortly after, he announced his retirement from professional football.

== International career ==
During his time at Newport County, Warren was selected for Great Britain's squad at the 2009's Universiade that took place in Serbia.

Two years later, he was selected for Great Britain's squad at the 2011's Universiade that took place in China (Shenzhen). Warren went on to finish as a top scorer and in 4th place and as a silver medalist. He later playing in China, saying: "I have to be honest and say it was one of the most incredible experiences, it was unbelievable really and I am so grateful to Anthony Hudson and everyone at the club for allowing me to go there. This was a once in a lifetime sort of experience, the World Student Games just in its sheer size is absolutely immense and to give you an idea, we had about 15,000 other athletes staying with us in what was a brand new purpose-built village." While attending university, Warren played alongside James Craigen in the tournament.

== Coaching career ==
While recovering from his leg injury, Warren began working on obtaining a UEFA Pro Licence coaching badge. After obtaining a UEFA Pro Licence coaching badge (both A and B), he worked as a coaching at Inverness Caledonian Thistle. After being released by Exeter City, Warren said he's considering doing coaching and start playing part–time football. Warren ended up being a coach at Exeter City as well being a college lecturer in sports and exercise science.

On 19 July 2022, having returned to Scotland to join Highland League side Clachnacuddin, Warren was appointed onto the Academy Coaching Team of Ross County, joining as Head of Professional Academy. Following his retirement from professional football, he focused his time on both his own individual coaching course called GW5 Elite Performance and Ross County.

In February 2025, Warren joined National League South club Weston-super-Mare as Head of Academy and Recruitment. He cited a move back to England was the factor of leaving Ross County.

== Personal life ==
Growing up in Olveston, Warren was a boyhood Bristol Rovers’ supporter. While playing for Mangotsfield United, Warren attended the University of Bath. He has a brother called Tom, who's also a footballer and attends the same university as him.

During his time at Newport County, he worked as a teacher in Bristol. Warren stayed as a teacher until leaving in June 2011. Warren later graduated with a Post Graduate Certificate in Education from the University of Bath. His wife, Amy, is a student of University of Gloucestershire. Together, the couple settled in Scotland. Together, they have two children.

During his time in Scotland, Warren took up fishing as his hobby. He's also a fan of cricket and watches Somerset County Cricket Club play at the County Ground.

== Career statistics ==
As of match played 2 January 2021.

Appearances and goals by club, season and competition
Club	Season	League			National Cup		League Cup		Other		Total	
Club	Season	Division	Apps	Goals	Apps	Goals	Apps	Goals	Apps	Goals	Apps	Goals
Newport County	2009–10	Conference South	37	5	0	0	—		4 (Note: Appearances in FA Trophy)	0	41	5
Newport County	2010–11	Conference Premier	41	6	1	0	—		2	0	44	6
Newport County	2011–12	Conference Premier	35	3	1	0	—		7	0	43	3
Newport County	Total		113	14	2	0	—		13	0	128	14
Inverness Caledonian Thistle	2012–13	Scottish Premier League	31	5	3	0	4	1	—		38	6
Inverness Caledonian Thistle	2013–14	Scottish Premiership	34	2	4	0	2	1	—		40	3
Inverness Caledonian Thistle	2014–15	Scottish Premiership	36	2	4	1	1	0	—		41	3
Inverness Caledonian Thistle	2015–16	Scottish Premiership	25	0	5	0	0	0	2 (Note: Appearances in UEFA Europa League)	0	32	0
Inverness Caledonian Thistle	2016–17	Scottish Premiership	33	2	2	0	5	1	—		40	3
Inverness Caledonian Thistle	2017–18	Scottish Championship	22	2	2	0	2	2	2 (Note: Appearances in Scottish Challenge Cup)	0	28	4
Inverness Caledonian Thistle	Total		181	13	20	1	14	5	4	0	219	19
Yeovil Town	2018–19	League Two	26	0	0	0	1	0	1 (Note: Appearance(s) in EFL Trophy)	0	28	0
Exeter City	2019–20	League Two	1	0	0	0	1	0	3	0	5	0
Torquay United (loan)	2019–20	National League	3	0	—		—		1	0	4	0
Torquay United	2020–21	National League	11	1	2	0	—		1	0	14	1
Career totals			335	28	24	1	16	5	23	0	398	34

== Honours ==
Newport County

- Conference South: 2009–10

Inverness Caledonian Thistle

- Scottish Cup: 2014–15
- Scottish Challenge Cup: 2017–18

Individual awards

- Newport County Player of the Year: 2009–10
