= 2014 Scottish League Cup final =

- Official programme cover
- Event: 2013–14 Scottish League Cup
Aberdeen	Inverness CT
0	0
- After extra time. Aberdeen won 4–2 on penalties.
- Date: 16 March 2014
- Venue: Celtic Park, Glasgow
- Man of the Match: Ross Draper (Inverness CT)
- Referee: Steven McLean
- Attendance: 51,143

The 2014 Scottish League Cup final was the 68th final of the Scottish League Cup. The final took place on 16 March 2014 at Celtic Park, Glasgow. The clubs contesting the 2014 final were Scottish Premiership clubs, Aberdeen and Inverness CT. This was the first major final for Inverness CT.

Aberdeen won the final 4–2 against Inverness CT on penalties. It was their first trophy since the 1995 Scottish League Cup victory.

== Route to the final ==
Aberdeen were one of the seven Scottish Premiership sides who entered the League Cup in the second round. Inverness CT entered in the third round.

=== Aberdeen ===
Round	Opposition	Score
2nd	Alloa Athletic (h)	0–0 (aet); 6–5 (p)
3rd	Falkirk (a)	5–0
QF	Motherwell (a)	2–0
SF	St Johnstone (n)	4–0
Key: (h) = Home venue; (a) = Away venue; (n) = Neutral venue.

In the second round Aberdeen faced a home tie against Scottish Championship team Alloa Athletic. The Dons edged through by winning 6–5 on penalties.

In the next round Aberdeen faced Scottish Championship team Falkirk at the Falkirk Stadium. A hat-trick from Scott Vernon and goals from Joe Shaughnessy and Cammy Smith sealed Aberdeen's passage into the quarter-final.

Aberdeen drew Scottish Premiership opposition in the quarter-finals in the shape of Motherwell. Late goals from Andrew Considine and Jonny Hayes sent the Dons into the semi-finals.

Aberdeen beat St Johnstone in the semi-final with a magnificent display. Jonny Hayes grabbed a double and Peter Pawlett and Adam Rooney also got themselves on the scoresheet to send Aberdeen to their first League Cup final since 2000.

=== Inverness CT ===
Round	Opposition	Score
3rd	Dundee (a)	1–0
QF	Dundee United (h)	2–1 (a.e.t.)
SF	Hearts (n)	2–2 (a.e.t.); 4–2 (p)
Key: (h) = Home venue; (a) = Away venue; (n) = Neutral venue.

In the third round Inverness CT faced an away tie against Scottish Championship team Dundee. An early goal from Billy McKay saw the Caley Jags through comfortably. In the next round Inverness CT faced fellow Scottish Premiership team Dundee United at the Caledonian Stadium. Keith Watson opened the scoring for Dundee United before Gary Warren equalised for the home side. Ross Draper sealed Caley's passage into the semi-finals with a header in the final minute of extra time.

Inverness CT beat Hearts on penalties in the semi-final. Greg Tansey put the Highlanders ahead shortly after half time, but a double from Jamie Hamill swung the game in the favour of the Edinburgh side. Nick Ross scored a dramatic injury time equaliser despite Caley having Gary Warren and Josh Meekings sent off.

=== Build-Up ===
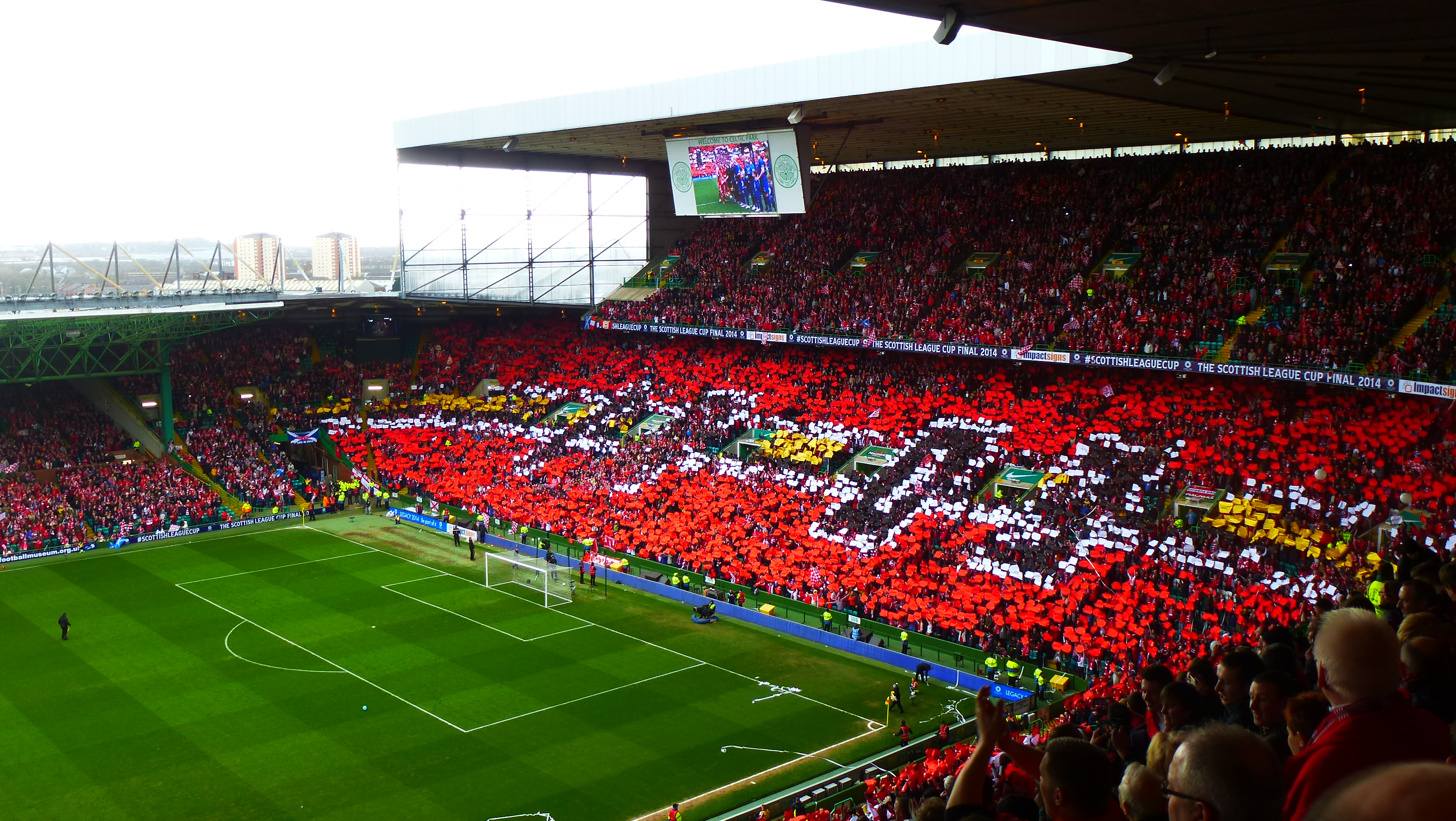
Aberdeen fans display "1903", the year of the club's establishment, before the cup final

Aberdeen received and sold all of their 43,000 allocation for the final and also had a request for more tickets declined due to safety concerns. Inverness sold 7,000 tickets.

== Match ==
=== Details ===
16 March 2014
14:30

Aberdeen	0–0 (a.e.t.)	Inverness CT
	Report
Penalties
Robson (penalty scored); Low (penalty scored); Vernon (penalty scored); Rooney (penalty scored)	4 – 2 Inverness CT went first	(penalty missed) Mckay; (penalty missed) Tansey; (penalty scored) Ross; (penalty scored) Doran

Celtic Park, Glasgow
Attendance: 51,143
Referee: Steven McLean

Aberdeen	Inverness CT

ABERDEEN:
GK	1	(Scotland) Jamie Langfield
RB	29	(England) Shay Logan
CB	4	(Scotland) Russell Anderson (c)
CB	6	(Scotland) Mark Reynolds
LB	5	(Scotland) Andrew Considine	(substituted off) 108'
RM	15	(Scotland) Barry Robson
CM	8	(Republic of Ireland) Willo Flood
CM	22	(Scotland) Ryan Jack
LM	11	(Republic of Ireland) Jonny Hayes	(substituted off) 6'
CF	10	(Northern Ireland) Niall McGinn
CF	17	(Republic of Ireland) Adam Rooney
Substitutes:
GK	20	(England) Nicky Weaver
DF	28	(England) Alan Tate
MF	18	(Scotland) Nicky Low	(substituted on) 70'
FW	9	(England) Scott Vernon	(substituted on) 108'
FW	14	(Scotland) Cammy Smith	(substituted on) 6' (substituted off) 70'
Manager:
(Scotland) Derek McInnes

INVERNESS CT:
GK	12	(England) Dean Brill
RB	2	(England) David Raven
CB	6	(England) Josh Meekings
CB	14	(Northern Ireland) Daniel Devine
LB	3	(Scotland) Graeme Shinnie	(yellow card) 112'
RM	15	(England) Marley Watkins		(substituted off) 80'
CM	8	(England) Ross Draper	(yellow card) 117'
CM	9	(Republic of Ireland) Richie Foran (c)	(yellow card) 27'	(substituted off) 100'
CM	16	(England) Greg Tansey
LM	4	(England) James Vincent		(substituted off) 63'
CF	7	(Northern Ireland) Billy Mckay
Substitutes:
GK	1	(Scotland) Ryan Esson
DF	18	(England) Carl Tremarco
MF	10	(Republic of Ireland) Aaron Doran		(substituted on) 63'
MF	11	(Scotland) Nick Ross		(substituted on) 80'
MF	36	(Scotland) Ryan Christie		(substituted on) 100'
Manager:
(Scotland) John Hughes

MATCH OFFICIALS

- Referee: Steven McLean
- Assistant Referee 1: Andrew McWilliam
- Assistant Referee 2: Douglas Ross
- Fourth Official: John Beaton

MATCH RULES

- 90 minutes
- 30 minutes of extra-time if necessary
- Penalty shoot-out if scores still level
- Five named substitutes
- Maximum of three substitutions
