= Matthew Cooper (footballer) =

Scottish footballer (born 1994)

Personal information
- Date of birth: 1 July 1994 (age 32)
- Place of birth: Macduff, Scotland
- Position: Defender

Team information
- Current team: Elgin City
- Number: 2

Youth career
- Deveronvale
- 2010–2012: Aberdeen

Senior career*
Years	Team	Apps	(Gls)
2012–2014	Inverness Caledonian Thistle	3	(0)
2014–	Elgin City	243	(6)
- * Club domestic league appearances and goals as of 00:16, 1 June 2025 (UTC)

Matthew Cooper (born 1 July 1994) is a Scottish professional footballer who plays as a defender for Scottish League Two club Elgin City.

He began his career with Inverness Caledonian Thistle.

== Early and personal life ==
Cooper was born in Macduff and attended Banff Academy. Cooper played for Macduff Lions Boys Club and Deveronvale, and also represented Aberdeenshire, North of Scotland Regional and Scotland Schoolboys National U18s.

== Career ==
Cooper began his career as a youth player for Macduff Lions Boys Club before moving onto Deveronvale and Aberdeen. He joined the senior team of Inverness Caledonian Thistle at the start of the 2012–13 season, going on to make his senior debut for Inverness in the Scottish Premier League on 22 December 2012.

After two years at the club, Cooper was released by Inverness and was among three players to join Elgin City.

== Career statistics ==
As of match played 3 May 2025

Appearances and goals by club, season and competition
Club	Season	League			Scottish Cup		League Cup		Other		Total	
Club	Season	Division	Apps	Goals	Apps	Goals	Apps	Goals	Apps	Goals	Apps	Goals
Inverness Caledonian Thistle	2012–13	Premier League	3	0	0	0	0	0	—		3	0
Inverness Caledonian Thistle	2013–14	Scottish Premiership	0	0	0	0	0	0	—		0	0
Inverness Caledonian Thistle	Total		3	0	0	0	0	0	0	0	3	0
Elgin City	2014–15	Scottish League Two	33	0	2	0	1	0	1 (Note: Appearances in the Scottish Challenge Cup)	0	37	0
Elgin City	2015–16	Scottish League Two	34	0	2	0	1	0	4 (Note: Two appearances in the Scottish Challenge Cup and two in the League One play-offs)	0	41	0
Elgin City	2016–17	Scottish League Two	28	0	3	0	3	0	2	0	36	0
Elgin City	2017–18	Scottish League Two	20	1	1	0	4	0	2	0	27	1
Elgin City	2018–19	Scottish League Two	25	0	3	0	4	0	1	0	33	0
Elgin City	2019–20	Scottish League Two	28	0	2	0	4	0	5	1	39	1
Elgin City	2020–21	Scottish League Two	20	1	1	0	4	0	2 (Note: Two appearances in the League One play-offs)	0	27	1
Elgin City	2021–22	Scottish League Two	20	3	2	0	2	0	0	0	24	3
Elgin City	2022–23	Scottish League Two	18	1	1	0	4	0	3	0	26	1
Elgin City	2023–24	Scottish League Two	15	0	1	0	0	0	1	0	17	0
Elgin City	2024–25	Scottish League Two	2	0	0	0	0	0	0	0	2	0
Elgin City	Total		243	6	18	0	27	0	21	1	304	7
Career total			246	6	18	0	27	0	21	1	307	7
