= Gavin Morrison =

Scottish footballer (born 1990)

Personal information
- Date of birth: 3 January 1990 (age 36)
- Place of birth: Inverness, Scotland
- Position: Midfielder

Team information
- Current team: Spartans
- Number: 6

Senior career*
Years	Team	Apps	(Gls)
2009–2013	Inverness Caledonian Thistle	26	(1)
2010	→ Elgin City (loan)	15	(2)
2012	→ Grindavík (loan)	5	(1)
2013	→ Elgin City (loan)	16	(1)
2013–2020	Brora Rangers		
2020–2022	Cowdenbeath	41	(1)
2022–	Spartans	0	(0)
- * Club domestic league appearances and goals as of 07:12, 25 June 2022 (UTC)

Gavin Morrison (born 3 January 1990) is a Scottish professional footballer who plays as a midfielder for Spartans.

Morrison has formerly played for Inverness, Elgin City, Brora Rangers and Cowdenbeath.

== Career ==
Morrison made his senior debut for Inverness Caledonian Thistle in the First Division on 22 August 2009. In April 2012, he signed a four-month loan deal with Icelandic side Grindavík. In January 2013, Morrison re-signed for Elgin City on loan for the second time, following an earlier spell in 2010.

He was released by Inverness Caledonian Thistle at the end of the 2012–13 season and signed for Brora Rangers in July, making his début in a friendly against Ross County.

In January 2020 he moved to Cowdenbeath, moving to Spartans in June 2022.

== Career statistics ==
As of 19 May 2013

Club	Season	League		FA Cup		League Cup		Other		Total	
Club	Season	Apps	Goals	Apps	Goals	Apps	Goals	Apps	Goals	Apps	Goals
Inverness Caledonian Thistle	2009–10	3	1	0	0	0	0	0	0	3	1
Inverness Caledonian Thistle	2010–11	10	0	0	0	1	0	0	0	11	0
Inverness Caledonian Thistle	2011–12	4	0	0	0	1	0	0	0	5	0
Inverness Caledonian Thistle	2012–13	9	0	0	0	2	0	0	0	11	0
Inverness Caledonian Thistle	Total	26	1	0	0	4	0	0	0	30	1
Elgin City (loan)	2009–10	15	2	0	0	0	0	0	0	15	2
Elgin City (loan)	2012–13	16	1	0	0	0	0	0	0	16	1
Elgin City (loan)	Total	31	3	0	0	0	0	0	0	31	3
Grindavík (loan)	2012	5	1	0	0	0	0	0	0	5	1
Career total		62	5	0	0	4	0	0	0	66	5
