= André Martins (footballer, born 1987) =

Portuguese footballer

Personal information
- Full name: André Filipe Saraiva Martins
- Date of birth: 26 March 1987 (age 39)
- Place of birth: Ferreira do Alentejo, Portugal
- Position: Forward

Youth career
- 1996–2001: Ferreirense
- 2001–2004: Despertar
- 2004–2005: Belenenses
- 2005–2006: Naval

Senior career*
Years	Team	Apps	(Gls)
2006–2007	Naval	0	(0)
2007	Fulham	0	(0)
2008	Vidima-Rakovski		
2008–2009	Jaguares Chiapas		
2009–2010	Caracas		
2010–2012	Bolívar	0	(0)
2010	→ Mariehamn (loan)	1	(0)
2012	Syrianska	0	(0)
2012	Inverness Caledonian Thistle	0	(0)
- * Club domestic league appearances and goals

André Filipe Saraiva Martins (born 26 March 1987) is a Portuguese former footballer who played as a forward.

== Football career ==
Martins was born in Ferreira do Alentejo, Beja District. After starting his football formation at local Sporting Clube Ferreirense, he finished it at C.F. Os Belenenses and Associação Naval 1º de Maio; in the 2006–07 season he trained briefly with the first team of the latter, but eventually did not make his Primeira Liga debut.

Subsequently, Martins' career took him to several countries and leagues: in summer 2007 he had an unsuccessful trial in Scotland with Dundee United, then played a couple of months in England with Fulham's reserves.

In the following years, Martins represented in quick succession PFC Vidima-Rakovski Sevlievo in Bulgaria, Chiapas in Mexico, Venezuela's Caracas F.C. and Club Bolívar from Bolivia. In early 2010, he was loaned to Finnish club IFK Mariehamn.

In early 2012, Martins signed with Syrianska FC from the Swedish Allsvenskan for six months, being released shortly after. In November of that year he joined Inverness Caledonian Thistle in the Scottish Premier League, but left the following month after only one appearance as an unused substitute.
