= Antonio Reguero =

Spanish footballer

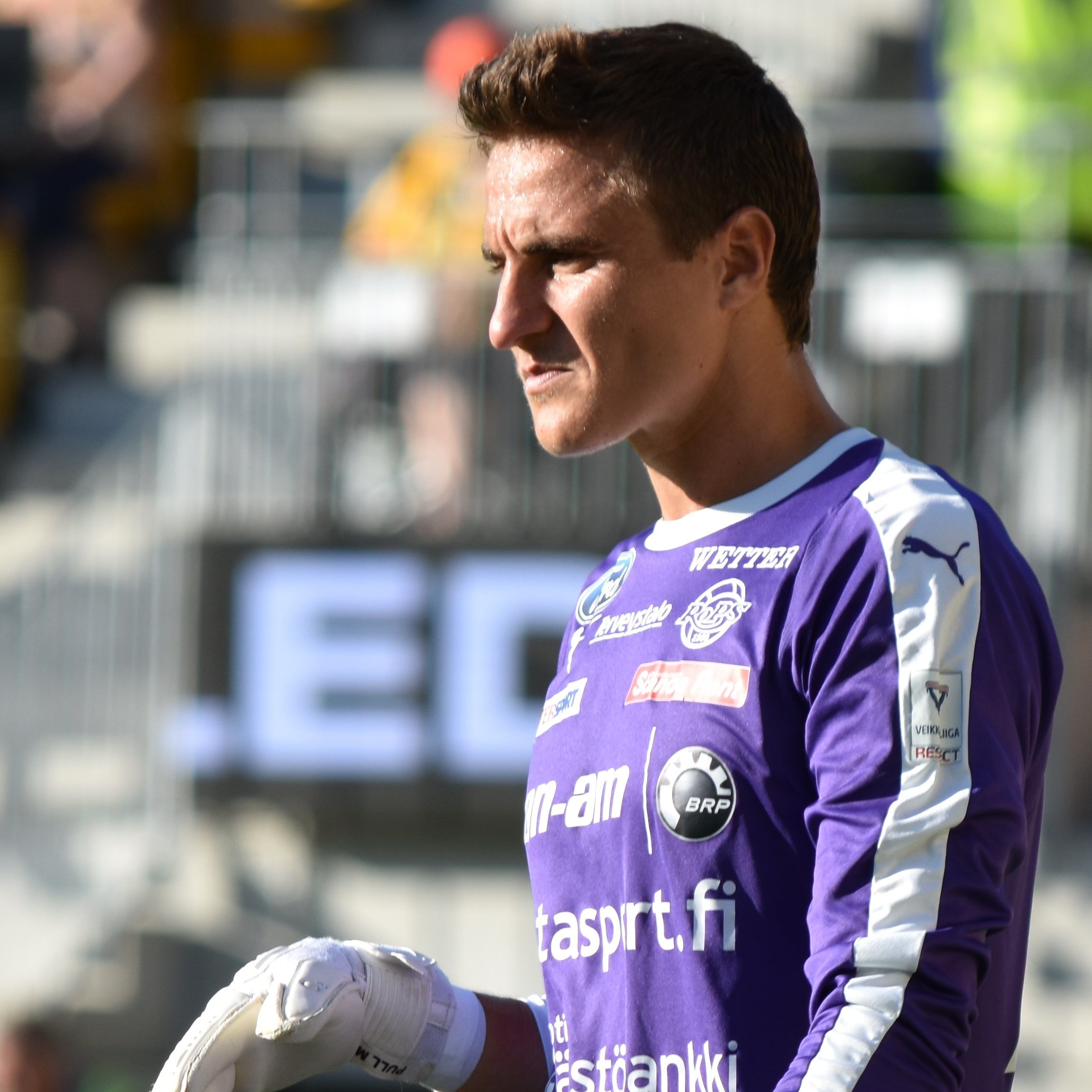
- Reguero with RoPS in 2018

Personal information
- Full name: Antonio Reguero Chapinal
- Date of birth: 4 July 1982 (age 44)
- Place of birth: Madrid, Spain
- Height: 1.87 m (6 ft 1 1/2 in)
- Position: Goalkeeper

Youth career
- Real Madrid

Senior career*
Years	Team	Apps	(Gls)
2001–2003	Real Madrid C		
2003–2004	Villarreal B	21	(0)
2004–2005	Orihuela		
2005–2007	Alicante	4	(0)
2007–2008	Mazarrón	32	(0)
2008	Lanzarote	11	(0)
2009–2010	Racing Ferrol	56	(0)
2010–2012	Gandía	39	(0)
2012–2013	Inverness Caledonian Thistle	24	(0)
2013–2014	Kilmarnock	0	(0)
2014–2015	Ross County	16	(0)
2015–2016	Hibernian	0	(0)
2016–2019	RoPS	107	(0)
2020	HJK	15	(0)
2021–2022	Lahti	40	(0)
2023	Klubi 04	22	(0)
Total		387	(0)
- * Club domestic league appearances and goals

Antonio Reguero Chapinal (born 4 July 1982) is a Spanish former professional footballer who played as a goalkeeper.

== Club career ==
Born in Madrid, Reguero started playing football with Real Madrid. After two seasons with the C team he was promoted to the main squad, but suffered a serious knee injury. Subsequently released, he never played in higher than Segunda División B in his country, representing Villarreal CF B, Orihuela CF, Alicante CF, Mazarrón CF, UD Lanzarote, Racing de Ferrol and CF Gandía.

In June 2012, aged 30, Reguero moved abroad for the first time, signing for Inverness Caledonian Thistle of the Scottish Premier League. He made his league debut on 29 September, in a 4–0 win over Dundee United.

Reguero signed a pre-contract with Kilmarnock in April 2013. He left the club in the summer of 2014, having not played once during the season.

On 16 June 2014, Reguero joined Ross County. He played his first competitive game on 10 August, in a 1–2 home loss to St Johnstone.

On 27 December 2014, Reguero put on a Player of the match performance to help hold defending champions Celtic to a 0–0 draw at Celtic Park. He was one of 14 players released by Ross County at the end of the campaign, and in July 2015 he agreed to a one-year contract at Hibernian.

Reguero left Hibs in January 2016, having only played for the first team in pre-season friendlies. On 5 May, he signed a three-month contract with Veikkausliiga side Rovaniemen Palloseura. On 28 October 2019, he joined Helsingin Jalkapalloklubi in the same league on a one-year deal.

Reguero continued in Finland the following years, with FC Lahti. On 3 January 2023 he returned to HJK, being assigned to their reserve team Klubi 04 and leaving in November.

== Honours ==
HJK

- Veikkausliiga: 2020
- Finnish Cup: 2020

Individual

- Veikkausliiga Goalkeeper of the Year: 2018
- Veikkausliiga Team of the Year: 2018
