= Richie Foran =

Irish football player and coach

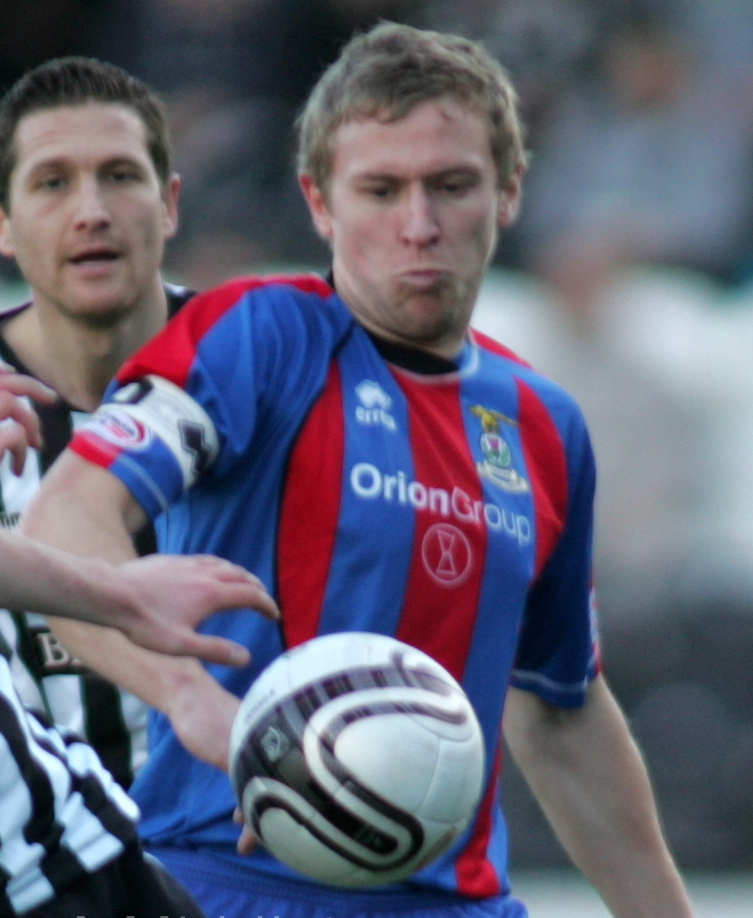

Personal information
- Full name: Richard Matthew Foran
- Date of birth: 16 June 1980 (age 46)
- Place of birth: Dublin, Ireland
- Positions: Midfielder; winger; striker

Youth career
- Belvedere

Senior career*
Years	Team	Apps	(Gls)
1998–1999	St Patrick's Athletic	0	(0)
1999–2001	Shelbourne	28	(11)
1999–2000	→ Home Farm (loan)	24	(7)
2001–2004	Carlisle United	91	(25)
2004	→ Oxford United (loan)	4	(0)
2004–2007	Motherwell	90	(23)
2007–2009	Southend United	21	(1)
2007–2008	→ Darlington (loan)	12	(3)
2008–2009	→ Darlington (loan)	9	(3)
2009–2016	Inverness Caledonian Thistle	168	(38)
Total		447	(111)

International career
2001–2002	Republic of Ireland U21	6	(2)

Managerial career
- 2016–2017: Inverness Caledonian Thistle
- * Club domestic league appearances and goals

Richard Foran (born 16 June 1980) is an Irish football player and coach.

He played for St Patrick's Athletic, Shelbourne, Carlisle United, Oxford United, Motherwell, Southend United, Darlington and Inverness Caledonian Thistle. After retiring as a player he became the manager of Inverness, but he left this position after the club were relegated in his first season in charge.

== Playing career ==
=== Ireland ===
Born in Dublin, Foran started his career in Ireland with St Patrick's Athletic but failed to make a first team appearance, before signing for fellow League of Ireland club Shelbourne in 2000. He finished his first season in the league by winning the PFAI Young Player of the Year award. Also during his debut season with Shelbourne, he scored home and away against Rosenborg in the second qualifying round of the UEFA Champions League, and made his debut for the Republic of Ireland under-21 international team in Cyprus.

=== Carlisle ===
In 2001, manager Roddy Collins spent £120,000 to secure Foran's signature for Carlisle United, in England. While at Brunton Park he scored twenty-nine goals, with sixteen of them coming in the 2001–2002 season, helping Carlisle to a respectable mid-table finish – despite the club's recent history of battling to stay in The Football League. Over the next two seasons, Carlisle struggled and Foran found it difficult to score goals. He had a short loan spell at Oxford United during the 2003–2004 season, but at the end of the campaign, Carlisle United were relegated. During his time at Carlisle, he had a highly publicised 'fight' in the tunnel with Huddersfield Town's Steve Yates after a series of fouls committed by Foran in the first-half. Both were sent-off, Yates lost a front tooth and Foran picked up a five-match ban.

=== Motherwell ===
Foran moved to Scottish Premier League outfit Motherwell on a free transfer in 2004, where he scored twenty-three league goals in ninety matches. He also played in the 2005 Scottish League Cup Final against Rangers, but Motherwell lost the match 5–1.

=== Southend ===
On 31 January 2007 he completed a £200,000 transfer to Southend United. His career at Southend started with an assist for Freddy Eastwood against Stoke City, after coming on as a substitute. He then had a man-of-the-match performance playing against Crystal Palace. However, his early, impressive start was somewhat tarnished when he was sent-off for a second bookable offence during a game against Leicester City. His first goal in a Southend shirt came in the 1–0 win against Burnley in the later part of the 2006–07 season. His only other goal for the club came in a Football League Trophy tie against Dagenham & Redbridge.

Foran went on-loan to Darlington from Southend, but due to a knee injury, he returned to his 'parent' club.
Nevertheless, he made a second loan-move to Darlington in October 2008 following an injury to their striker Liam Hatch. He did not play for Southend during the 2008–09 season and his contract was terminated in January 2009.

=== Inverness ===
Soon afterwards he joined Inverness Caledonian Thistle on a deal until the end of the season, making him their first signing under manager Terry Butcher. Foran made his debut in a goalless draw against Celtic and scored his first goal for the club in a 2–0 win over Hibernian. He also netted a hat-trick for Inverness in an emphatic 5–1 win over Ayr United.

Following Inverness' relegation to the First Division in 2010, Foran became the club captain. He was involved in most of the games during the club's promotion back to the Scottish Premier League.

In January 2012, he signed a new-deal to keep him at the club until 2014. On 12 September 2013, Foran was awarded the SPFL Player of the Month for August.

Due to a complicated knee injury, he missed the latter part of the 2013–14 season and the entire 2014–15 campaign where he watched from the sidelines as Inverness lifted their first major honour with the Scottish Cup and finished the season in third place. Foran made three substitute appearances in the 2015–16 season before he suffered a calf muscle tear in February 2016.

It was reported that he could miss the rest of the season but he managed to make a surprise return in March he was an unused substitute a 1–1 draw at Easter Road In The Scottish Cup Quarter Final against Hibernian and the following league game away To St Johnstone F.C. He came off the bench in the 65th minute in a home 1–0 defeat to Hamilton Academical F.C. he impressed Yogi Hughes enough that he gave Foran a surprise start in the 2-1 Quarter Final replay home defeat to Hibernian. He made a late substitute appearance in the 3-0 Highland derby win in Dingwall.

He was an unused substitute through the majority of April and did not make an appearance till the last day of the month a substitute appearance away to Partick Thistle F.C an emphatic 4–1 away win for the Caley Jags.

May was a better month for the Irishman making substitute appearances in the last 3 games of the season a 3–2 home loss against Dundee United F.C. and a 1–0 away win at Hamilton. He scored a penalty during the final day of the season against Dundee F.C. in a battle for seventh place after Liam Polworth got brought down in the box. He scored the resulting penalty it was the fourth goal it was his also his first goal since November 2013 the game ended 4-0 a result that secured 7th place in The SPFL. Another reason fans knew it was a special moment as Foran stated 24 hours before that he would like regular first team football if he were to continue being a football player and felt he would not get that at Inverness. Leading to speculation that he would leave along with David Raven who was nearing the end of his contract. Raven had fallen out with manager John Hughes. It did turn out to be his final goal not just for Inverness Caledonian Thistle but his last goal as a player. However, even though Foran took the penalty, the crowd were calling for him to let David Raven take it, due to him becoming a club hero because of his goal that sent Inverness into the Scottish Cup final the previous year, in the end Foran took the penalty and Raven stayed at the club, while manager at the time, John Hughes, left the club after a fall out, due to the lack of star players staying at the club, with Richie taking the reins the next week.

== Coaching career ==
=== Inverness manager ===
On 30 May 2016, Foran was appointed manager of Inverness Caledonian Thistle on a four-year contract. When he was appointed manager, Foran also announced his retirement from playing. During the summer, Inverness signed Billy King on loan from Hearts, Kevin McNaughton, Jake Mulraney and Scott Boden.

Inverness managed to progress through their 2016–17 Scottish League Cup group, but then lost their first league game (2–0 at Partick Thistle) and were knocked out of the League Cup by League One side Alloa. This was followed by league defeats to Ross County and Hearts. Foran took blame for the loss to Hearts and promised to get better results and a few more players in to strengthen the squad. Before the international break Foran signed Lonsana Doumbouya, Brad McKay and Larnell Cole.

Inverness got their first league win of the season before the international break in late August, a 2–1 home win against St Johnstone. Despite winning Manager of the month in September, Inverness continued to struggle throughout the season where they failed to win a single league game between 29 October to 24 February and won once in a 23-game span from October 29 to April 29, and were relegated to the Championship on the final day of the season despite three wins in the last four games and thanks to Hamilton Academical 4–0 win against Dundee. On Monday 29 May, nine days after relegation to the Championship Foran was relieved of his duties as Inverness boss.

== Honours ==
Carlisle United

- Football League Trophy runner-up: 2002–03

Inverness Caledonian Thistle

- Scottish First Division: 2009–10
- Scottish Cup: 2014–15

Individual

- PFAI Young Player of the Year: 2000–01
- SPFL Player of the Month: August 2013

Gaelic Football

St Joseph's/O'Connell Boys

Dublin Junior B Gaelic Football Championship: 2004

== Managerial statistics ==
As of match played 20 May 2017

Managerial record by team and tenure
Team	From	To	Record				
Team	From	To	G	W	D	L	Win %
Inverness Caledonian Thistle	30 May 2016	29 May 2017	45	11	14	20	24.44
