= Inverness Caledonian Thistle F.C. in European football =

Scottish club in European football

Inverness Caledonian Thistle in European football
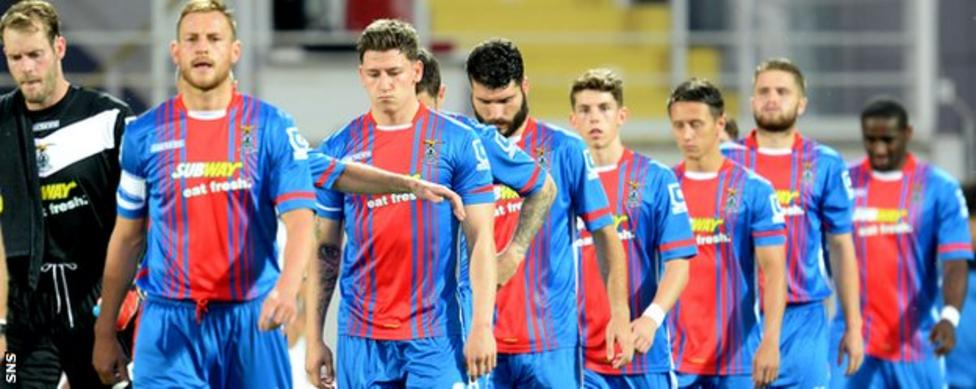
- Inverness CT coming onto the pitch at Stadionul Marin Anastasovici, Giurgiu
- Club: Inverness Caledonian Thistle F.C.
- Seasons played: 1
- Most appearances: 13 Players (2)
- First entry: 2015–16 UEFA Europa League
- Latest entry: 2015–16 UEFA Europa League

Titles
- Europa League: 0 (Best: Second Qualifying Round

Inverness Caledonian Thistle F.C. played their first official match in European competition on 16 July 2015. This made the club the first (and as of 2026, only) club from the Highlands to represent the area in European football.

Inverness' best run in European competition was their debut against Astra Giurgiu of Romania where they narrowly lost 1–0 on aggregate thanks to a Constantin Budescu free kick in Inverness, denying an all British tie in the following round against English Premier League side, West Ham United.

Inverness first qualified for Europe with a 3rd-placed finish, and a Scottish Cup title in the 2014–15 season following a 1–0 away victory over Dundee in the League, with the Scottish Cup title moving them forward a round.

Prior to this, Inverness narrowly missed out on an earlier European debut before they had even been promoted to the Premier League, having finished in the Scottish Cup semi finals in both 2003 and 2004, losing to Dundee, and Dunfermline Athletic, respectively. Had Inverness won either tie, they would've qualified for the UEFA Cup, due to the cup winners (Rangers in 2003, and Celtic in 2004) having already qualified for the Champions League through league standings, passing the UEFA Cup berth to the Scottish Cup runner up; a rule that would be removed in 2014.

In the 2012–13 season, Inverness came even closer to Europe; having spent much of the season in and around the top 3, a crushing 1–0 defeat against rivals, Ross County on the final day of the season forced Inverness out of the top 3, and missing European qualification by 2 points.

Inverness again nearly qualified for Europe in 2023, through the Scottish Cup, where they lost the final 3–1 to Celtic. Had they won, they would've entered the Europa League Play-Off and would have been guaranteed Group Stage football in either the Europa League or Europa Conference League.

== Matches ==
=== 2015–16 UEFA Europa League ===
On 22 June 2015, Inverness were drawn against Romanian Liga I side, Astra Giurgiu in the Second Qualifying Round of the 2015–16 UEFA Europa League, their maiden season in UEFA competition. On 16 July, in front of a near sell-out crowd, Inverness lost 1–0 courtesy of a Constantin Budescu free kick slipping through the gloves of debutant goalkeeper, Owain Fôn Williams, who had only arrived from League Two side, Tranmere Rovers that morning. On 22 July, Inverness were held to a 0–0 draw in Giurgiu, with Ryan Christie nearly levelling the aggregate just before half time, but unfortunately, it wasn't enough to progress to the next round where Premier League side, West Ham United would have been the opponent in what would be their final season at the Boleyn Ground.

16 July 2015 Second Qualifying Round	Inverness Caledonian Thistle	0 – 1	Astra Giurgiu (Romania)	Inverness
19:45		Report	Budescu 24'	Stadium: Caledonian Stadium; Attendance: 5,534; Referee: (Norway) Henry Johnsen

22 July 2015 Second Qualifying Round	(Romania) Astra Giurgiu	0 – 0 (1 – 0 agg.)	Inverness Caledonian Thistle	Giurgiu
19:00		Report		Stadium: Stadionul Marin Anastasovici; Attendance: 3,067; Referee: (Kazakhstan) Artyom Kuchin

== Statistics ==
Note: Inverness scores are listed first.

List of Inverness CT games in European Competitions
Season	Competition	Round	Opponent	Home	Away	Other	Agg.	(Note: Round or group progressed or eliminated)	Notes
2015–16	Europa League	QR2	(Romania) Astra Giurgiu	0–1	0–0		0–1		

=== By competition ===
Competition	Pld	W	D	L	GF	GA	GD
UEFA Europa League	2	0	1	1	0	1	–1
Total	2	0	1	1	0	1	–1

=== By country ===
Country	Pld	W	D	L	GF	GA	GD	Win%	Ref
Romania	2	0	1	1	0	1	–1	0.00	

== Player statistics ==
=== Top 10 Appearances ===
Players in bold are still active for the club. Correct as of 22 July 2015 (vs. Astra Giurgiu).

#	Player	Apps.	Comps.
1=	(Wales) Owain Fôn Williams	2	UEL
1=	(England) Gary Warren	2	UEL
1=	(England) Nat Wedderburn	2	UEL
1=	**(Northern Ireland) Danny Devine**	2	UEL
1=	(England) Josh Meekings	2	UEL
1=	(England) David Raven	2	UEL
1=	(England) Greg Tansey	2	UEL
1=	(Republic of Ireland) Aaron Doran	2	UEL
1=	(England) Ross Draper	2	UEL
1=	(England) Danny Williams	2	UEL
1=	(Scotland) Ryan Christie	2	UEL
1=	(Spain) Dani López	2	UEL
1=	(Republic of Ireland) Richie Foran	2	UEL
2	(England) Jordan Roberts	1	UEL

=== Top 10 Goalscorers ===
No Inverness CT players as of 22 July 2015 have scored in Europe.
