= 2016–17 Dundee F.C. season =

Dundee
2016–17 season
- Chairman: Tim Keyes
- Manager: Paul Hartley (until 17 April); Neil McCann (Interim) (from 18 April)
- Stadium: Dens Park
- Scottish Premiership: 10th
- League Cup: Group Stage
- Scottish Cup: Fourth round, lost to St Mirren
- Top goalscorer: League: Marcus Haber (9); All: Marcus Haber (9)
- Average home league attendance: 6,460
Home colours	Away colours	Third colours

The 2016–17 season was Dundee's third consecutive season in the top flight of Scottish football since their promotion at the end of the 2013–14 season. Dundee also competed in the League Cup and the Scottish Cup.

== Season events ==
On 17 April, Dundee sacked manager Paul Hartley, replacing him with Neil McCann the following day on an interim basis.

== Competitions ==
=== Premiership ===
==== Results ====
6 August 2016 1	Ross County	1 – 3	Dundee	Dingwall
15:00 BST (UTC+1)	Quinn (yellow card) 25'; McEveley (yellow card) 41'; Curran 67'; Routis (yellow card) 88'	BBC Report	Loy 13', 41' (pen.); McGowan 62' (yellow card) 79'; Williams (yellow card) 65'	Stadium: Global Energy Stadium; Attendance: 3,669; Referee: Bobby Madden

13 August 2016 2	Dundee	1 – 2	Rangers	Dundee
12:15 BST (UTC+1)	O'Dea (yellow card) 34'; O'Hara 44' (yellow card) 86'	BBC Report	Wilson (yellow card) 5'; Forrester 14' (yellow card) 46'; Miller 39'	Stadium: Dens Park; Attendance: 9,702; Referee: Craig Thomson

19 August 2016 3	Dundee	1 – 1	Hamilton Academical	Dundee
19:45 BST (UTC+1)	O'Hara 17'; Etxabeguren (yellow card) 42'	BBC Report	Lyon 13' (yellow card) 62'; Donati (yellow card) 74'	Stadium: Dens Park; Attendance: 5,287; Referee: Kevin Clancy

27 August 2016 4	Motherwell	0 – 0	Dundee	Motherwell
15:00 BST (UTC+1)	Heneghan (yellow card) 84'	BBC Report	O'Hara (yellow card) 27'; McGowan (yellow card) 31'	Stadium: Fir Park; Attendance: 4,078; Referee: Andrew Dallas

10 September 2016 5	Dundee	1 – 1	Kilmarnock	Dundee
15:00 BST (UTC+1)	El Bakhtaoui 7' (yellow card) 86'; Hateley (yellow card) 41'; McGowan (yellow card) 48'; Gomis (red card) 82'	BBC Report	Coulibaly 32'; S.Boyd (yellow card) 84'; Roberts (yellow card) 88'	Stadium: Dens Park; Attendance: 5,111; Referee: Don Robertson

18 September 2016 6	Dundee	1 – 3	Aberdeen	Dundee
12:00 BST (UTC+1)	Holt 13'; Kerr (yellow card) 22'; O'Dea (yellow card) 53'; O'Hara (yellow card) 64' (yellow-red card) 90+2'; Etxabeguren (yellow card) 87'	BBC Report	Maddison 19'; O'Connor (yellow card) 44'; Shinnie (yellow card) 54'; Hayes (yellow card) 62'; Stockley 77'; McLean 88' (pen.); Burns (yellow card) 90+1'	Stadium: Dens Park; Attendance: 6,321; Referee: Steven McLean

24 September 2016 7	Inverness Caledonian Thistle	3 – 1	Dundee	Inverness
15:00 BST (UTC+1)	Doumbouya 8' (yellow card) 48'; Tansey 17' (pen.); Polworth 51'; Warren (yellow card) 75'	BBC Report	Ross (yellow card) 54'; Etxabeguren (yellow card) 63'; Low 84' (yellow card) 86'	Stadium: Tulloch Caledonian Stadium; Attendance: 2,884; Referee: Kevin Clancy

1 October 2016 8	Dundee	0 – 1	Celtic	Dundee
12:15 BST (UTC+1)	Kerr (yellow card) 11'; Williams (yellow card) 22'	BBC Report	Brown 47'; Bitton (yellow card) 90+2'	Stadium: Dens Park; Attendance: 8,827; Referee: Andrew Dallas

15 October 2016 9	Heart of Midlothian	2 – 0	Dundee	Edinburgh
15:00 BST (UTC+1)	Öztürk (yellow card) 20'; Paterson 68'; Johnsen 89'	BBC Report	McGowan (yellow card) 67'	Stadium: Tynecastle Stadium; Attendance: 16,512; Referee: Kevin Clancy

23 October 2016 10	St Johnstone	2 – 1	Dundee	Perth
12:00 BST (UTC+1)	Davidson (yellow card) 33'; Anderson 62'; Swanson 75' (pen.)	BBC Report	Holt (yellow card) 23'; Gomis (yellow card) 75'; Loy 88' (pen.)	Stadium: McDiarmid Park; Attendance: 3,646; Referee: Andrew Dallas

26 October 2016 11	Dundee	0 – 2	Partick Thistle	Dundee
19:45 BST (UTC+1)	McGowan (yellow card) 78'	BBC Report	Azeez 29' (yellow card) 79'; Doolan 62'; Wilson (yellow card) 90+1'; Elliott (yellow card) 90+3'	Stadium: Dens Park; Attendance: 4,783; Referee: Steven McLean

29 October 2016 12	Hamilton Academical	0 – 1	Dundee	Hamilton
15:00 BST (UTC+1)	Imrie (yellow card) 57'; Kurtaj (yellow card) 73'	BBC Report	Hateley (yellow card) 32'; McGowan 62'	Stadium: New Douglas Park; Attendance: 1,853; Referee: Stephen Finch

5 November 2016 13	Dundee	2 – 0	Motherwell	Dundee
15:00 GMT (UTC)	Kerr 40'; Haber 80'; Williams (yellow card) 90+4'	BBC Report	Hammell (yellow card) 42'; McManus (yellow card) 54'	Stadium: Dens Park; Attendance: 5,471; Referee: John Beaton

19 November 2016 14	Rangers	1 – 0	Dundee	Glasgow
15:00 GMT (UTC)	Halliday (yellow card) 68'; Forrester 90+2'	BBC Report	Holt (yellow card) 40'; O'Dea (yellow card) 82'	Stadium: Ibrox Stadium; Attendance: 48,773; Referee: Willie Collum

26 November 2016 15	Dundee	2 – 1	Inverness Caledonian Thistle	Dundee
15:00 GMT (UTC)	Wighton 25'; Vincent (yellow card) 57'; Gadzhalov 60'; Hateley (yellow card) 78'; O'Dea (yellow card) 90+2'	BBC Report	Tremarco 81'; Cole (yellow card) 85'; Horner (red card) 90+4'	Stadium: Dens Park; Attendance: 5,094; Referee: Andrew Dallas

3 December 2016 16	Kilmarnock	2 – 0	Dundee	Kilmarnock
15:00 GMT (UTC)	Hendrie (yellow card) 15'; McKenzie 22'; Coulibaly (yellow card) 36' (goal) 70'	BBC Report	Kerr (yellow card) 10'; Gadzhalov (yellow card) 48'; McGowan (yellow card) 87'	Stadium: Rugby Park; Attendance: 3,615; Referee: Crawford Allan

10 December 2016 17	Dundee	0 – 0	Ross County	Dundee
15:00 GMT (UTC)	McGowan (yellow card) 67'; Gadzhalov (yellow card) 68'	BBC Report	Boyce (yellow card) 53'; McEveley (yellow card) 56'; Dow (yellow card) 80'	Stadium: Dens Park; Attendance: 4,742; Referee: Euan Anderson

17 December 2016 18	Celtic	2 – 1	Dundee	Glasgow
15:00 GMT (UTC)	Griffiths 45+2'; Bitton 57'; Šimunović (yellow card) 89'	BBC Report	O'Dea (yellow card) 45'; Haber 69'	Stadium: Celtic Park; Attendance: 37,404; Referee: Bobby Madden

23 December 2016 19	Dundee	3 – 2	Heart of Midlothian	Dundee
19:45 GMT (UTC)	O'Dea 54'; McGowan 71'; Holt (yellow card) 88'; Haber 90+3'	BBC Report	Walker 3' (pen.); Paterson 48'; Smith (yellow card) 90+3'	Stadium: Dens Park; Attendance: 6,160; Referee: Kevin Clancy

28 December 2016 20	Partick Thistle	2 – 0	Dundee	Glasgow
19:45 GMT (UTC)	Booth 16' (yellow card) 75'; Doolan 44'; Elliott (yellow card) 65'; Devine (yellow card) 77'; Osman (yellow card) 83'; Welsh (yellow card) 90+5'	BBC Report	O'Dea (yellow card) 76'; Haber (yellow card) 81'	Stadium: Firhill Stadium; Attendance: 3,758; Referee: Alan Muir

31 December 2016 21	Dundee	3 – 0	St Johnstone	Dundee
15:00 GMT (UTC)	El Bakhtaoui 15'; Kerr (yellow card) 23'; Gadzhalov 42'; Anderson 57' (o.g.)	BBC Report	Paton (yellow card) 41'; Swanson (yellow card) 90'	Stadium: Dens Park; Attendance: 6,492; Referee: Don Robertson

27 January 2017 22	Aberdeen	3 – 0	Dundee	Aberdeen
19:45 GMT (UTC)	Jack 29'; McGinn 45', 80'; Shinnie (yellow card) 73'	BBC Report	Etxabeguren (yellow card) 65'	Stadium: Pittodrie Stadium; Attendance: 10,512; Referee: Kevin Clancy

4 February 2017 23	Inverness Caledonian Thistle	2 – 2	Dundee	Inverness
15:00 GMT (UTC)	Mckay 53' (pen.) (yellow card) 58'; Tremarco (yellow card) 75'; Tansey (yellow card) 75' (goal) 79'	BBC Report	Haber 37'; O'Dea 43' (yellow card) 48'; Etxabeguren (yellow card) 52'; McGowan (yellow card) 63'	Stadium: Caledonian Stadium; Attendance: 2,606; Referee: Nick Walsh

11 February 2017 24	Dundee	1 – 1	Kilmarnock	Dundee
15:00 GMT (UTC)	Holt 27' (yellow card) 86'; McGowan (yellow card) 31'	BBC Report	K.Boyd 9'; Longstaff (yellow card) 37'; Sammon (yellow card) 55'; Addison (yellow card) 61'	Stadium: Dens Park; Attendance: 4,708; Referee: Alan Muir

19 February 2017 25	Dundee	2 – 1	Rangers	Dundee
15:15 GMT (UTC)	O'Hara 13'; Holt 41'; Etxabeguren (yellow card) 60'	Report	Garner 62' (yellow card) 63'	Stadium: Dens Park; Attendance: 9,017; Referee: Craig Thomson

25 February 2017 26	Motherwell	1 – 5	Dundee	Motherwell
15:00 GMT (UTC)	Moult 22' (yellow card) 69'; Heneghan (yellow card) 45+1'; McDonald (yellow card) 84'	Report	Jules 7' (o.g.); Haber 27', 45+1'; O'Hara 31'; Wighton 35'; Vincent (yellow card) 74'	Stadium: Fir Park; Attendance: 4,002; Referee: Stephen Finnie

1 March 2017 27	Dundee	0 – 1	Partick Thistle	Dundee
19:45 GMT (UTC)		Report	Etxabeguren 30' (o.g.); Barton (yellow card) 70'; Erskine (yellow card) 71'	Stadium: Dens Park; Attendance: 5,328; Referee: John Beaton

11 March 2017 28	St Johnstone	2 – 0	Dundee	Perth
15:00 GMT (UTC)	Paton 12'; Alston 19'; MacLean (yellow card) 89'	Report	O'Hara (yellow card) 26'; El Bakhtaoui (yellow card) 69'; Williams (yellow card) 84'	Stadium: McDiarmid Park; Attendance: 4,195; Referee: Andrew Dallas

19 March 2017 29	Dundee	1 – 2	Celtic	Dundee
12:30 GMT (UTC)	McGowan (yellow card) 21'; Gomis (yellow card) 35'; O'Dea (yellow card) 41'; El Bakhtaoui 76'; Holt (yellow card) 90+1'	Report	Šimunović 45+1'; Armstrong 52'; Brown (yellow card) 62'; Eboue (yellow card) 74'; Dembélé (yellow card) 87'	Stadium: Dens Park; Attendance: 8,968; Referee: Willie Collum

31 March 2017 30	Dundee	0 – 7	Aberdeen	Dundee
19:45 BST (UTC+1)	Kerr (yellow card) 81'	Report	Considine 17', 39', 83'; Rooney 25'; McLean 34'; Jack 51'; McGinn 73'	Stadium: Dens Park; Attendance: 7,314; Referee: Alan Muir

4 April 2017 31	Ross County	2 – 1	Dundee	Dingwall
19:45 BST (UTC+1)	Chow 7'; Davies (yellow card) 25'; O'Brien (yellow card) 56' (yellow-red card) 81'; Boyce 90' (pen.); Curran (yellow card) 90+1'	Report	O'Dea (yellow card) 27' (goal) 45' (pen.); Williams (yellow card) 52' (yellow-red card) 90+2'; O'Hara (yellow card) 90+1'	Stadium: Global Energy Stadium; Attendance: 2,819; Referee: John Beaton

8 April 2017 32	Heart of Midlothian	1 – 0	Dundee	Edinburgh
15:00 BST (UTC+1)	Gonçalves 13'	Report	Kerr (yellow card) 36'	Stadium: Tynecastle Stadium; Attendance: 16,304; Referee: Crawford Allan

15 April 2017 33	Dundee	0 – 2	Hamilton Academical	Dundee
15:00 BST (UTC+1)		Report	D'Acol 23' (pen.); Bingham (yellow card) 68'; Devlin 84'	Stadium: Dens Park; Attendance: 6,489; Referee: John Beaton

29 April 2017 34	Motherwell	2 – 3	Dundee	Motherwell
15:00 GMT (UTC)	Moult 50'; Cadden 80'; McHugh (yellow card) 90+3'	Report	Gomis (yellow card) 29'; O'Hara 45', 56'; Haber 49' (yellow card) 90+3'	Stadium: Fir Park; Attendance: 4,919; Referee: Steven McLean

6 May 2017 35	Kilmarnock	0 – 1	Dundee	Kilmarnock
15:00 BST (UTC+1)	Taylor (yellow card) 49'	Report	Haber 55'; Gomis (yellow card) 62'	Stadium: Rugby Park; Attendance: 4,040; Referee: Craig Thomson

13 May 2017 36	Dundee	1 – 1	Ross County	Dundee
15:00 BST (UTC+1)	McGowan (yellow card) 62'; Vincent (yellow card) 63'; O'Dea 76' (pen.) (yellow card) 77'	Report	Boyce 4'; Fraser (yellow card) 33'; Woods (yellow card) 54'; Gardyne (yellow card) 65'; O'Brien (yellow card) 69'; Curran (yellow card) 76'; Tumilty (yellow card) 90+4'	Stadium: Dens Park; Attendance: 6,812; Referee: Nick Walsh

17 May 2017 37	Dundee	0 – 2	Inverness Caledonian Thistle	Dundee
19:45 BST (UTC+1)		Report	Mckay 2'; Fisher 10'; Vigurs (yellow card) 65'; Anier (yellow card) 81'	Stadium: Dens Park; Attendance: 5,574; Referee: Kevin Clancy

20 May 2017 38	Hamilton Academical	4 – 0	Dundee	Hamilton
15:00 BST (UTC+1)	Bingham 23'; Skondras 25'; Imrie 56' (pen.); Gogić (yellow card) 58'; Crawford 76'	Report	El Bakhtaoui (yellow card) 84'	Stadium: New Douglas Park; Attendance: 2,616; Referee: Crawford Allan

=== Scottish Cup ===
21 January 2017 Fourth round	Dundee	0 – 2	St Mirren	Dundee
15:00 GMT (UTC)		BBC Report	Mallan (yellow card) 14'; Sutton 25'; Baird 50'	Stadium: Dens Park; Attendance: 3,622; Referee: Bobby Madden

=== League Cup ===
16 July 2016 1	East Fife	1 – 1 (4–2 p)	Dundee	Methil
15:00 BST (UTC+1)	Smith 78'; Robinson (yellow card) 85'	SPFL Report	Hemmings 36'; Holt (yellow card) 77'	Stadium: Bayview Stadium; Attendance: 1,407; Referee: Barry Cook
	Penalties
	Mercer (penalty scored); McManus (penalty missed); Duggan (penalty scored); Lamont (penalty scored); Robinson (penalty scored)		(penalty scored) Hemmings; (penalty missed) Loy; (penalty missed) Vincent; (penalty scored) Williams

23 July 2016 2	Dundee	6 – 2	Dumbarton	Dundee
15:00 BST (UTC+1)	Stewart 16', 74', 80'; Hemmings 48', 85'; O'Dea (yellow card) 56' (goal) 73'	SPFL Report	Wright 26'; Buchanan 33'	Stadium: Dens Park; Attendance: 2,319; Referee: Kevin Clancy

26 July 2016 3	Peterhead	2 – 1	Dundee	Peterhead
20:00 BST (UTC+1)	Dzierzawski (yellow card) 21'; McAllister 62', 88' (pen.); McIntosh (yellow card) 71'; Redman (yellow card) 87'	SPFL Report	Bain (yellow card) 88'; Stewart 90'	Stadium: Balmoor Stadium; Attendance: 998; Referee: Nick Walsh

30 July 2016 4	Dundee	7 – 0	Forfar Athletic	Dundee
15:00 BST (UTC+1)	McGowan 18'; Duffy 34'; Stewart 39', 64'; Etxabeguren 55'; Loy 72'; Teijsse 88'	SPFL Report		Stadium: Dens Park; Attendance: 2,219; Referee: Willie Collum

=== Challenge Cup ===
2 August 2016 First Round	Cove Rangers	2 – 1	Dundee U20s	Forfar
19:45 BST (UTC+1)	Buchan 78'; Scully 84'	SPFL Report	Warwick 29'	Stadium: Station Park; Attendance: 190; Referee: Mike Roncone

== Squad statistics ==
=== Appearances ===
As of match played 20 May 2017

No.	Pos	Nat	Player	Total		Scottish Premiership		Scottish Cup		Scottish League Cup	
No.	Pos	Nat	Player	Apps	Goals	Apps	Goals	Apps	Goals	Apps	Goals
1	GK	(Scotland) SCO	Scott Bain	39	0	36	0	1	0	2	0
3	DF	(Scotland) SCO	Kevin Holt	42	3	37	3	1	0	4	0
4	MF	(England) ENG	James Vincent	32	0	27+1	0	0	0	3+1	0
6	DF	(Republic of Ireland) IRL	Darren O'Dea	39	5	35	4	0	0	4	1
7	MF	(England) ENG	Tom Hateley	28	0	26+1	0	1	0	0	0
11	MF	(England) ENG	Danny Williams	28	0	11+12	0	0+1	0	3+1	0
12	GK	(Scotland) SCO	David Mitchell	4	0	2	0	0	0	2	0
14	MF	(Scotland) SCO	Mark O'Hara	32	5	26+2	5	1	0	2+1	0
16	DF	(Spain) ESP	Julen Etxabeguren	22	1	14+3	0	1	0	4	1
17	MF	(Scotland) SCO	Nick Ross	21	0	11+8	0	0	0	2	0
18	MF	(Scotland) SCO	Paul McGowan	39	4	35+1	3	1	0	1+1	1
20	FW	(France) FRA	Faissal El Bakhtaoui	31	3	15+15	3	1	0	0	0
21	FW	(Canada) CAN	Marcus Haber	28	9	27	9	1	0	0	0
22	FW	(Estonia) EST	Henrik Ojamaa	14	0	9+5	0	0	0	0	0
23	MF	(Netherlands) NED	Marc Klok	2	0	0+2	0	0	0	0	0
26	DF	(Bulgaria) BUL	Kostadin Gadzhalov	19	2	15+3	2	1	0	0	0
27	MF	(Australia) AUS	Jesse Curran	2	0	1	0	0	0	0+1	0
30	DF	(Scotland) SCO	Cammy Kerr	41	1	35+1	1	1	0	4	0
33	FW	(Scotland) SCO	Craig Wighton	35	2	19+12	2	1	0	2+1	0
45	DF	(Scotland) SCO	Daniel Higgins	4	0	2+2	0	0	0	0	0
55	DF	(France) FRA	Kévin Gomis	23	0	22	0	0	0	0+1	0
Players away from the club on loan:
8	MF	(Scotland) SCO	Nicky Low	2	1	2	1	0	0	0	0
9	FW	(Scotland) SCO	Rory Loy	17	4	4+9	3	0	0	2+2	1
19	FW	(Netherlands) NED	Yordi Teijsse	11	1	3+6	0	0	0	1+1	1
Players who left Dundee during the season:
7	FW	(Scotland) SCO	Greg Stewart	3	6	0	0	0	0	3	6
10	MF	(Northern Ireland) NIR	Michael Duffy	13	1	4+4	0	0+1	0	3+1	1
15	MF	(England) ENG	Kane Hemmings	2	3	0	0	0	0	2	3

=== Goal scorers ===
As of match played 20 May 2017

Ranking	Nation	Position	Number	Name	Scottish Premiership	Scottish Cup	Scottish League Cup	Total
1	FW	(Canada)	21	Marcus Haber	9	0	0	9
2	FW	(Scotland)	9	Greg Stewart	0	0	6	6
3	MF	(Scotland)	14	Mark O'Hara	5	0	0	5
3	DF	(Republic of Ireland)	6	Darren O'Dea	4	0	1	5
5	FW	(Scotland)	9	Rory Loy	3	0	1	4
5	MF	(Scotland)	18	Paul McGowan	3	0	1	4
7	DF	(Scotland)	3	Kevin Holt	3	0	0	3
7	MF	(France)	20	Faissal El Bakhtaoui	3	0	0	3
7	MF	(England)	15	Kane Hemmings	0	0	3	3
7				Own goal	2	0	1	3
11	DF	(Bulgaria)	26	Kostadin Gadzhalov	2	0	0	2
11	FW	(Scotland)	33	Craig Wighton	2	0	0	2
11	MF	(Scotland)	8	Nicky Low	1	0	0	1
11	DF	(Scotland)	30	Cammy Kerr	1	0	0	1
11	MF	(Northern Ireland)	10	Michael Duffy	0	0	1	1
11	DF	(Spain)	16	Julen Etxabeguren	0	0	1	1
11	FW	(Netherlands)	19	Yordi Teijsse	0	0	1	1
TOTALS					38	0	15	53

=== Disciplinary record ===
As of match played 20 May 2017

Nation	Position	Number	Name	Premier League		Scottish Cup		League Cup		Total	
Nation	Position	Number	Name	Yellow card	Red card	Yellow card	Red card	Yellow card	Red card	Yellow card	Red card
(Scotland)	GK	1	Scott Bain	0	0	0	0	1	0	1	0
(Scotland)	DF	3	Kevin Holt	5	0	0	0	1	0	6	0
(Scotland)	MF	4	James Vincent	3	0	0	0	0	0	3	0
(Republic of Ireland)	DF	6	Darren O'Dea	10	0	0	0	1	0	11	0
(England)	MF	7	Tom Hateley	3	0	0	0	0	0	3	0
(Scotland)	MF	8	Nicky Low	1	0	0	0	0	0	1	0
(England)	MF	11	Danny Williams	6	1	0	0	0	0	6	1
(Scotland)	MF	14	Mark O'Hara	6	1	0	0	0	0	6	1
(Spain)	DF	16	Julen Etxabeguren	6	0	0	0	0	0	6	0
(Scotland)	MF	17	Nick Ross	1	0	0	0	0	0	1	0
(Scotland)	MF	18	Paul McGowan	11	0	0	0	0	0	11	0
(France)	MF	20	Faissal El Bakhtaoui	3	0	0	0	0	0	3	0
(Canada)	FW	21	Marcus Haber	2	0	0	0	0	0	2	0
(Bulgaria)	DF	26	Kostadin Gadzhalov	2	0	0	0	0	0	2	0
(Scotland)	DF	30	Cammy Kerr	6	0	0	0	0	0	6	0
(France)	DF	55	Kévin Gomis	4	1	0	0	0	0	4	1
			TOTALS	69	3	0	0	3	0	72	3

== Club statistics ==
=== League table ===
Pos	Team	Pld	W	D	L	GF	GA	GD	Pts	Qualification or relegation (Note: Teams played each other three times (33 matches), before the league split into two groups (the top six and the bottom six) for the last five matches.)
8	Kilmarnock	38	9	14	15	36	56	−20	41	
9	Motherwell	38	10	8	20	46	69	−23	38	
10	Dundee	38	10	7	21	38	62	−24	37	
11	Hamilton Academical (O)	38	7	14	17	37	56	−19	35	Qualification for the Premiership play-off final
12	Inverness Caledonian Thistle (R)	38	7	13	18	44	71	−27	34	Relegation to the Scottish Championship

Source: Scottish Premiership, Soccerway
Rules for classification: 1) Points; 2) Goal difference; 3) Goals scored; 4) Play-off (only if deciding champion, UEFA competitions qualification and second stage group allocation).
(O) Play-off winners; (R) Relegated

=== League Cup table ===
Pos	Team	Pld	W	OTW	OTL	L	GF	GA	GD	Pts	Qualification
1	Peterhead (Q)	4	2	1	0	1	8	6	+2	8	Second Round
2	East Fife (X)	4	2	1	0	1	5	4	+1	8	Best Runners-up
3	Dundee	4	2	0	1	1	15	5	+10	7	
4	Forfar Athletic	4	1	1	0	2	4	11	−7	5	
5	Dumbarton	4	0	0	2	2	7	13	−6	2	

Source: BBC
(Q) Qualified; (X) Advances to Best runners-up

=== Results by round ===
Round	1	2	3	4	5	6	7	8	9	10	11	12	13	14	15	16	17	18	19	20	21	22	23	24	25	26	27	28	29	30	31	32	33	34	35	36	37	38
Ground	A	H	H	A	H	H	A	H	A	A	H	A	H	A	H	A	H	A	H	A	H	A	A	H	H	A	H	A	H	H	A	A	H	A	A	H	H	A
Result	W	L	D	D	D	L	L	L	L	L	L	W	W	L	W	L	D	L	W	L	W	L	D	D	W	W	L	L	L	L	L	L	L	W	W	D	L	L
Position	1	4	6	5	6	8	9	10	12	12	12	12	11	12	7	10	10	10	7	9	8	9	10	7	6	6	8	8	8	8	9	9	11	9	9	9	10	10

Source: See results
A = Away; H = Home; W = Win; D = Draw; L = Loss

== Transfers ==
=== In ===
Date	Position	Nationality	Name	From	Fee
30 May 2016	FW	(Netherlands)	Yordi Teijsse	Quick Boys	Free
1 June 2016	MF	(England)	James Vincent	Inverness Caledonian Thistle	Free
1 June 2016	MF	(Scotland)	Danny Williams	Inverness Caledonian Thistle	Free
8 June 2016	DF	(Scotland)	Mark O'Hara	Kilmarnock	Free
2 August 2016	FW	(France)	Faissal El Bakhtaoui	Dunfermline Athletic	Free
19 August 2016	DF	(France)	Kévin Gomis	Nice	Free
26 October 2016	FW	(Canada)	Marcus Haber		Free
31 January 2017	MF	(Netherlands)	Marc Klok		Free

=== Out ===
Date	Position	Nationality	Name	To	Fee
22 June 2016	DF	(Scotland)	Paul McGinn	Chesterfield	Free
28 June 2016	DF	(Scotland)	Daryll Meggatt	Ayr United	Free
27 July 2016	FW	(England)	Kane Hemmings	Oxford United	Undisclosed
12 August 2016	MF	(Scotland)	Gary Harkins	Ayr United	Free
12 August 2016	FW	(Scotland)	Greg Stewart	Birmingham City	£500,000
5 September 2016	DF	(England)	Tom Hateley	Śląsk Wrocław	Free

=== Loans in ===
Date from	Date to	Position	Nationality	Name	From
30 June 2016	31 January 2017	FW	(Northern Ireland)	Michael Duffy	Celtic
31 January 2017	End of Season	FW	(Estonia)	Henrik Ojamaa	Go Ahead Eagles

=== Loans out ===
Date from	Date to	Position	Nationality	Name	To
6 January 2017	End of Season	DF	(Northern Ireland)	Conor Quigley	Stirling Albion
12 January 2017	End of Season	FW	(Scotland)	Rory Loy	St Mirren
31 January 2017	End of Season	FW	(Netherlands)	Yordi Teijsse	Wuppertaler SV
30 January 2017	End of Season	MF	(Scotland)	Nicky Low	Derry City
30 January 2017	End of Season	DF	(Scotland)	Matty Allan	Montrose
31 January 2017	End of Season	DF	(Northern Ireland)	Matthew Smyth	Arbroath

=== Released ===
Date	Position	Nationality	Name	Joined	Date
11 May 2016	DF	(Germany)	Thomas Konrad	Vaduz	19 August 2016
31 August 2016	DF	(Scotland)	Andrew Black		
7 April 2017	MF	(Netherlands)	Marc Klok		

== See also ==
- List of Dundee F.C. seasons
