= James Vincent (footballer) =

English footballer (born 1989)

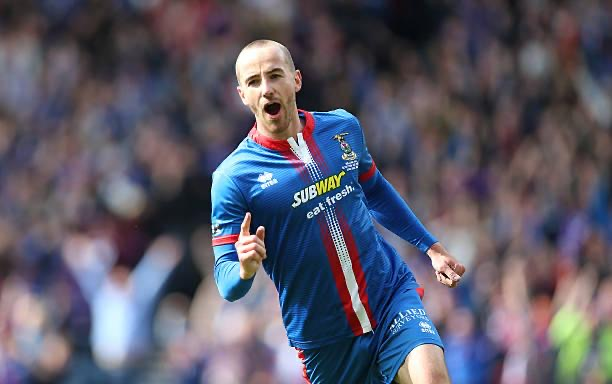
- James Vincent celebrating scoring the winning goal in the 2015 Scottish Cup Final

Personal information
- Full name: James Michael Vincent
- Date of birth: 27 September 1989 (age 37)
- Place of birth: Glossop, England
- Position: Midfielder

Team information
- Current team: Stockport County (youth coach)

Youth career
- 1997–2007: Stockport County

Senior career*
| Years | Team | Apps | (Gls) |
| 2007–2011 | Stockport County | 72 | (2) |
| 2011–2013 | Kidderminster Harriers | 68 | (6) |
| 2013–2016 | Inverness Caledonian Thistle | 58 | (4) |
| 2016–2019 | Dundee | 31 | (0) |
| 2018 | → Dunfermline Athletic (loan) | 10 | (0) |
| 2018–2019 | → Dunfermline Athletic (loan) | 29 | (1) |
| 2019–2021 | Inverness Caledonian Thistle | 25 | (2) |
| 2021–2022 | Hereford | 27 | (0) |
| 2022–2023 | FC United of Manchester | 19 | (1) |
| 2023–2024 | Stockport Town | 35 | (4) |
| Total | | 374 | (20) |

International career
| 2012 | England C | 1 | (0) |
- * Club domestic league appearances and goals

James Michael Vincent (born 27 September 1989) is an English former professional footballer and coach who is a youth coach at Stockport County.

Over his career, Vincent played for Stockport County, Kidderminster Harriers, Inverness Caledonian Thistle (two spells), Dundee, Hereford, F.C. United of Manchester, Stockport Town, and had two loan spells with Dunfermline Athletic. He is most notable for scoring Inverness CT's winning goal in the 2015 Scottish Cup final over Falkirk to give the Highland side its first-ever major trophy.

== Club career ==
=== Stockport County ===
Born in Glossop, Vincent joined Stockport County 'Centre of Excellence' when he was eight years old, having previously started out at Glossop Juniors. When Vincent was ten years old, he then joined Centre of Excellence at Stockport. Vincent then progressed through the ranks to earn a two-year Youth Team scholarship. He played for the Youth Team, winning the Puma Youth Alliance trophy before making his first-team debut, in his second year Youth Team contract, as a substitute in a 1–0 win over Brentford on the last day of the 2007–08 season.

Vincent made his first appearance of the 2008–09 season, coming on as a 62nd-minute substitute, in a 3–0 loss against Scunthorpe United on 30 August 2008. Following this, he received a handful of first team football, mostly coming from the substitute bench. Vincent scored his first goal for the club on 18 November 2008 in a 5–0 win over Yeovil Town in the FA Cup. On 10 March 2009, he scored his first league goal for Stockport County in a 2–1 win over Hartlepool United. After the match, manager Jim Gannon praised the performance of Vincent, Matty Mainwaring and Greg Tansey, calling them as 'just three fantastic players'. On 24 April 2009, he scored his second league goal of the season, in a 4–1 win against Crewe Alexandra. At the end of the 2008–09 season, Vincent made nineteen appearances and scoring three times in all competitions.

Following Stockport County entering administration in the 2009–10 season, Vincent became a first team regular, playing in the midfield position. On 18 August 2009, he set up a goal that led to Richard Keogh scoring an own goal, in a 2–1 loss against Carlisle United. Two months later on 12 October 2009, Vincent played a role when he won a penalty, leading Carl Baker score a penalty, in a 1–0 win against Tranmere Rovers. However, Vincent was unable to help Stockport County avoid relegation in League One after losing 3–1 loss against Yeovil Town on 10 April 2010. At the end of the 2009–10 season, Vincent made thirty–nine appearances in all competitions. Following this, he was offered a new contract by the club, who will be playing in the League Two next season.

In the 2010–11 season, Vincent found his playing time, coming from the substitute bench. Towards the end of the season, he suffered an injury that saw him out for the remaining matches of the season. On 30 April 2011, Stockport County was relegated from the Football League after losing 2–0 against Crewe Alexandra. At the end of the 2010–11 season, Vincent made nineteen appearances in all competitions. Following this, Vincent was informed that he would not be offered a further contract by Stockport due to the club's financial position as they struggled with administration.

=== Kidderminster Harriers ===
On 23 June 2011, Vincent joined Conference National outfit Kidderminster Harriers on a one-year contract under the management of Steve Burr.

He made his debut for the club, starting the whole game, in a 3–2 defeat to Gateshead in the opening game of the season. Manager Burr assured that Vincent will eventually score for Kidderminster Harriers. After missing one match, he returned to the starting line–up, in a 2–0 loss against Wrexham on 3 September 2011. On 17 September 2011, Vincent scored his first goal for the club, in a 3–1 win against Alfreton Town. However, in a match against Fleetwood Town on 20 September 2011, he suffered a groin injury and was substituted at half-time, as Kidderminster Harriers loss 5–2. After missing two matches, Vincent returned to the first team, coming on as a 55th-minute substitute, in a 1–0 win against Kettering Town on 1 October 2011. Following his return from injury, he became a first team regular, playing in the midfield position. On 18 October 2011, Vincent scored twice for the club, in a 5–4 win over Braintree Town. After missing three matches due to a knee injury, he returned to the first team, coming on as a 76th-minute substitute, in a 1–0 win against Forest Green Rovers on 26 December 2011. However, his return was short–lived when Vincent suffered a knee injury once again and was out for a month. On 15 February 2012, he returned to the starting line–up, in a 6–2 win against Evesham United in the semi–final of Worcestershire Senior Cup. After not playing for a month, Vincent returned to the first team, coming on as a 79th-minute substitute, in a 3–1 win against Darlington on 24 March 2012. At the end of the 2011–12 season, he made twenty–eight appearances and scoring three goals in all competitions. Following this, Vincent signed a new one-year contract with Kidderminster Harriers.

At the start of the 2012–13 season, Vincent started in the first four league matches of the season before missing two matches, due to a groin injury. On 4 September 2012, he returned to the first team, coming on as a 59th-minute substitute, in a 1–1 draw against Braintree Town. Since returning from injury, Vincent regained his first team place, playing in the midfield position. On 9 October 2012, he scored his first goal of the season, in a 3–0 win against Hyde. After missing two matches with a groin injury, Vincent returned to the starting line–up, in a 1–0 win against Tamworth on 4 December 2012. However, his return was short–lived when he suffered a knee injury and missed two matches. On 5 February 2013, Vincent returned to the first team, in a 2–1 loss against Redditch United in the semi–final of Worcestershire Senior Cup. After being dropped for one match, he scored his second goal of the season, in a 3–2 win against Ebbsfleet United on 2 March 2013. Despite the injuries Vincent faced, he continued to remain in the first team in the second half of the season. After missing one match, Vincent scored his third goal of the season, in a 2–1 win against Wrexham on 13 April 2013. However, he was unable to help Kidderminster Harriers’ promotion after losing in both legs against Wrexham. Following this, the club triggered Vincent’s contract for another season. However, it was later emerged that he yet to sign for Kidderminster Harriers, leading him to be linked with a move to Inverness Caledonian Thistle. At the end of the 2012–13 season, Vincent made forty appearances and scoring three times in all competitions.

=== Inverness Caledonian Thistle ===
On 3 June 2013, Vincent signed for Scottish Premiership side Inverness Caledonian Thistle on an initial one-year contract. Manager Burr claimed that Kidderminster Harriers would be entitled to compensation, as Vincent was under-23. But Kidderminster Harriers would not get compensation for him, due to international borders.

He scored on his Inverness Caledonian Thistle’s debut in the opening game of the 2013–14 season, winning 3–0 over St Mirren. After his debut, Vincent stated that he believed his move to Inverness was a "step up in my career." After the match, manager Terry Butcher praised his performance, saying: "James is someone I really like. He's one of several players to come to us from non-league football down south and they are making their mark." Since joining the club, Vincent became a first team regular, playing in the midfield position. However, he suffered a knee injury that kept him out for the rest of the year. On 18 January 2014, Vincent returned from injury, coming on as a 75th-minute substitute, in a 1–0 win against Aberdeen. In a follow–up match against Hearts in the semi–finals of the Scottish League Cup, he played a role of setting up two goals that send the match to extra time and penalty shootout, as the club won on penalties to reach the Scottish League Cup final. On 15 February 2014, after a reported interest from other clubs south of the border, Vincent signed a contract extension with Inverness Caledonian Thistle, keeping him until 2016. Following his return from injury, he regained his first team place, playing in the midfield position. Vincent started in the Scottish League Cup Final against Aberdeen, playing 63 minutes before being substituted, as the club lost 4–2 on penalties after a 0–0 draw. However, he suffered a knee injury that saw him out for three matches. But Vincent made his return to the starting line–up, in a 2–2 draw against St Johnstone on the last game of the season. At the end of the 2013–14 season, he made twenty–seven appearances and scoring once in all competitions.

Ahead of the 2014–15 season, Vincent said: "The gaffer came in last season and wanted to change things. He wanted to do it differently, do it his way. All the lads have bought into that. We want to get the ball down and play. I started the season and played the first 10 or so games but, unfortunately, I fractured my leg and was out for four months. I managed to get into the team again at the end of the season but I never got up to the pace I set at the start of the season. I’m looking to get going again." However, he suffered a groin injury. Shortly after, Vincent suffered ankle injury and was out for two months. On 18 October 2014, he made his return from injury, coming on as a 66th-minute substitute, in a 1–0 win against St Mirren. On 8 November 2014, Vincent scored his first goal of the season, in a 4–2 win against Hamilton Academical. Following his return from injury, his playing time was soon reduced, coming from the substitute bench. He soon found himself out of the first team, due to his own injury concern once again. On 11 April 2015, Vincent returned to the first team, coming on as an 86th-minute substitute, in a 1–1 draw against Celtic. Following his return from injury, Inverness Caledonian Thistle went onto have the most successful period in their history finishing 3rd in the Scottish Premiership and qualifying to play in Europe. On 30 May 2015, Vincent came on as a substitute with twenty minutes of the Scottish Cup Final remaining at Hampden Park and scored the decisive goal in a 2–1 victory against Falkirk, winning the club their first Scottish Cup. After the match, he said: "I dreamt about this all week. I knew I wasn’t playing, so I knew I had to come on and make an impact. To get the winning goal…I am over the moon. It’s fantastic, it’s the pinnacle and the sort of game you want to be playing in." Vincent also dedicated his goal to his family and said "it was the greatest moment of his life". At the end of the 2014–15 season, he made twenty–four appearances and scoring two times in all competitions.

However, at the start of the 2015–16 season, Vincent suffered a knee injury and was substituted in the 50th minute, in a 1–1 draw against St Mirren in a friendly match. After the match, he was out for two months. On 11 September 2015, Vincent scored on his return from injury, in a 2–1 win against Hearts to give Inverness Caledonian Thistle first win of the season. After the match, he said: "It’s great to be back playing again firstly. I’m feeling good again now. I’ve trained the last week. I’m still feeling the effects of football a bit but with a few games I’ll get more sharp and I’ll kick on from there. I felt good against Hearts. I just need more games to get sharp again." On 3 October 2015, he scored his second goal of the season, in a 2–1 win against local rivals, Ross County. After the match, Vincent credited manager John Hughes for persuading him to stay at the club following interest from Dundee United in the summer transfer window. After missing one match due to a knock, he returned to the starting line–up, in a 1–0 loss against St Johnstone on 24 October 2015. Following his return from injury, Vincent regained his first team place, playing in the midfield position. However, he suffered a knee injury that saw him out for three months. On 9 April 2016, he made his return from injury, coming on as a 63rd-minute substitute, in a 2–0 loss against Dundee United. At the end of the 2015–16 season, Vincent made nineteen appearances and scoring two times in all competitions.

=== Dundee ===
On 22 March 2016, Dundee announced that Vincent had signed a 3-year pre contract agreement with the club along with former fellow Inverness teammate Danny Williams. Upon joining the club, manager Paul Hartley said: "Vincent will be more of an attacking midfielder for us. He is somebody who can get into the box. We felt we lacked goals from the middle of the park last year so he gives us options."

Vincent made his debut for the club against East Fife in the group stage of the Scottish League Cup, coming on as a 66th-minute substitute, and played all the way to the penalty–shootout, where he was one of the players to be missed the penalty, resulting in their loss. However, Vincent suffered a knee injury that saw him out for two matches. On 15 October 2016, he made his return to the first team, starting a match and played 76 minutes before being substituted, in a 2–0 loss against Hearts. Following his return, Vincent featured regularly under manager Paul Hartley but under new management changes happened within the club. He continued to face his own injury concerns later in the 2016–17 season. At the end of the 2016–17 season, Vincent made thirty–two appearances in all competitions.

Ahead of the 2017–18 season, new manager Neil McCann rebuilt the squad and the majority of the squad looked to move on, including Vincent. As a result, he found himself out of the first team, due to competitions in the midfield position. His lack of first team opportunities at Dundee led to his former club, Inverness Caledonian Thistle, keen on re-signing Vincent in the January transfer window. However, manager John Robertson ruled out on signing him. In the first half of 2017–18 season, he made just five first team appearances for the club.

Following his return from a loan spell at Dunfermline Athletic, Vincent was released by Dundee at the end of the 2018–19 season. He later reflected on his time at club, saying: "Dundee was a strange one for me. I was happy at the time – it was a good move – but Paul Hartley left and the new manager (Neil McCann) wanted his own team. Sometimes, that just happens in football, like any walk of life. He shipped out a lot of us. I went out and played football at Dunfermline and got back to enjoying it again. I’m coming back with the same mindset to do as well as we can."

==== Dunfermline Athletic (loan) ====
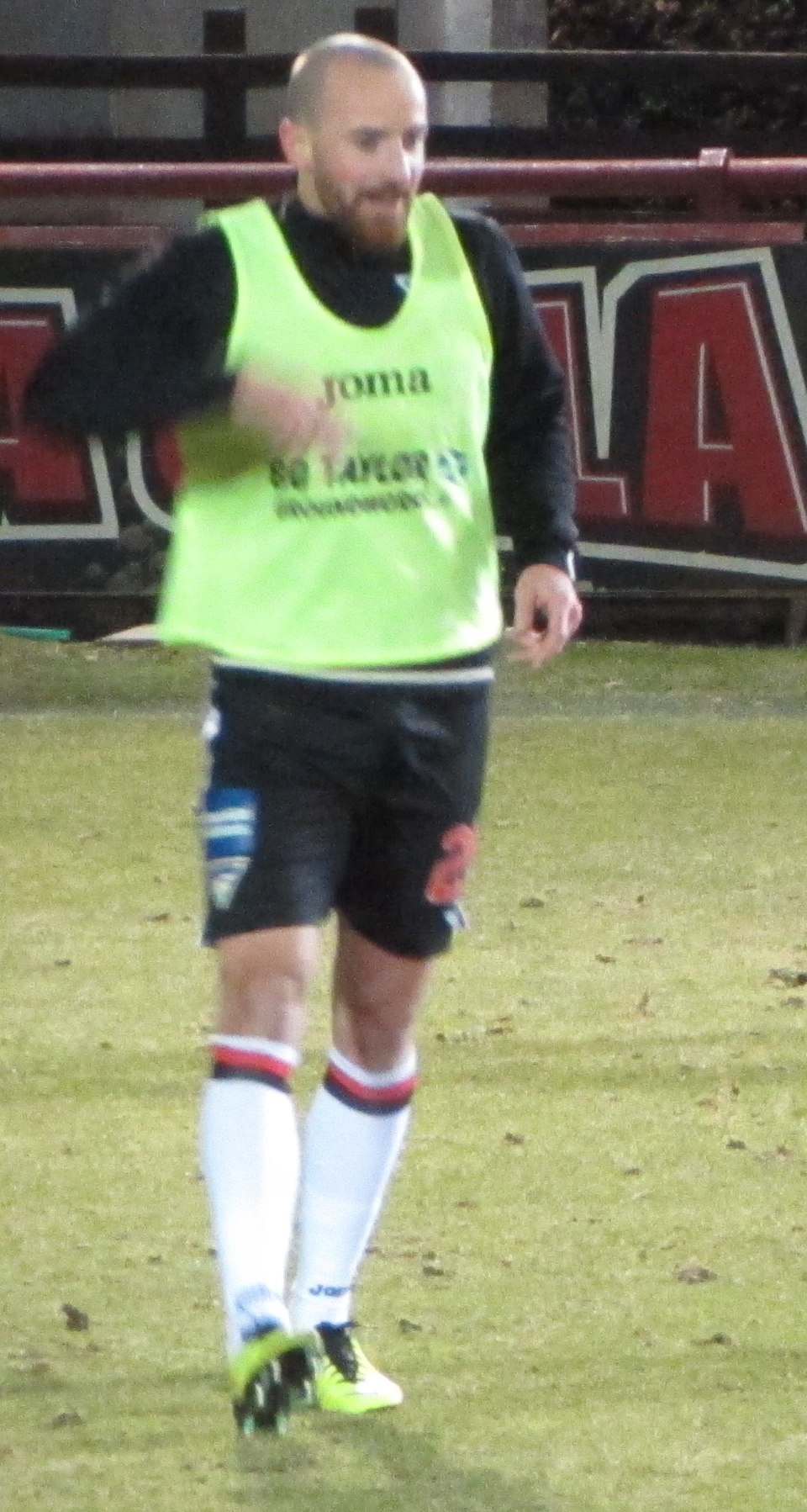
Vincent training for Dunfermline Athletic in 2018.

On 29 January 2018, Vincent moved on loan to Scottish Championship club Dunfermline Athletic. He made his debut for the club, starting the whole game, in a 0–0 draw against Livingston on 10 February 2018. Since joining Dunfermline Athletic, Vincent became a first team regular, playing in the midfield position. After missing three matches due to an injury, he made his return to the first team, starting a match and played 74 minutes before being substituted, in a 4–0 win against Brechin City on 14 April 2018. However, Vincent was unsuccessful in the club’s play–offs after losing 2–1 on aggregate against Dundee United. At the end of the 2017–18 season, he made twelve appearances in all competitions.

Vincent returned to East End Park for the 2018–19 season, signing a season-long loan deal on 3 July 2018. After missing two matches, he made his second debut for Dunfermline Athletic, coming on as a second–half substitute, in a 7–1 win against Brechin City in the group stage of the Scottish League Cup. Vincent scored his first goal for the club, in a follow–up match against Stirling Albion in the group stage of the Scottish League Cup, in a 3–1 win. However, despite being involved in the first team, he suffered injuries as the 2018–19 season progressed. On 29 December 2018, Vincent scored his second goal of the season, in a 4–2 win against Falkirk. At the end of the 2018–19 season, he made thirty–two appearances and scoring two times in all competitions. Following this, Vincent returned to his parent club.

=== Inverness Caledonian Thistle (second spell) ===
Vincent returned to Inverness Caledonian Thistle and signed a two-year contract on 20 June 2019.

Having recovered from a calf injury, he made his second debut for the club, coming on as a second-half substitute against Peterhead in the group stage of the Scottish League Cup scored in a 11–10 penalty loss. Four days later on 20 July 2019, Vincent made his full debut four days later in a 4–1 win over Raith Rovers. Since re-joining Inverness Caledonian Thistle, he became a first team regular, playing in the midfield position. On 5 October 2019, Vincent scored his first goal for the club in four years, in a 2–0 win against Ayr United. However, he suffered a calf injury that saw him out for four matches. On 21 December 2019, he returned from injury, coming on as a 74th-minute substitute, in a 2–0 win against Dunfermline Athletic. Following this, Vincent continued to regain his first team place, playing in the midfield position. He played a role of setting up a winning goal for Miles Storey, in a 2–1 win Against Rangers B team in the semi–finals of the Scottish Challenge Cup to reach the final. After missing two matches due to an injury, Vincent scored his second goal of the season, in a 2–1 win against Queen of the South. However, Inverness Caledonian Thistle finished second in the 2019–20 Scottish Championship, which was curtailed due to the coronavirus pandemic and the Scottish Challenge Cup final was cancelled. At the end of the 2019–20 season, he made twenty–eight appearances and scoring two times in all competitions.

At the start of the 2020–21 season, however, Vincent suffered a knock that saw him out for one match. On 13 October 2020, he made his return from injury against Cowdenbeath in the group stage of the Scottish League Cup, starting a match and played 65 minutes before being substituted, as Inverness Caledonian Thistle won on penalties. After the match, Vincent said: "I was over the moon. It’s something we have all missed – it was my first competitive game for over six months. It was really good for me. Personally it was about getting minutes in the legs and catching up, as I had missed out on just short of two weeks through injury." However, his playing time at the club was soon reduced, due to competitions and his own injury concerns. After two months of not playing, he returned to the starting line–up, in a 1–1 draw against Dunfermline Athletic on 29 December 2020. However, his return to the first team was short–lived when he suffered a thigh injury and did not play for two months, even after returning from injury. Vincent made his first appearance in two months, coming on as a 72nd-minute substitute, in a 4–1 win against Greenock Morton on 6 April 2021. Following this, he returned to the substitute bench for the rest of the season despite being fit. At the end of the 2020–21 season, Vincent made eight appearances in all competitions.

On 15 June 2021, Vincent left Inverness Caledonian Thistle for the second time upon expiry of his contract after being released by the club.

=== Hereford ===
On 1 July 2021, Vincent agreed to join National League North side Hereford, joining alongside teammate Miles Storey, Josh Gowling (who’s manager at Kidderminster Harriers and worked with assistant Steve Burr, a big pull to signing at the club amidst interest from others).

He made his debut for the club, starting the whole game, in a 1–0 loss against Farsley Celtic in the opening game of the season. However, Vincent suffered a calf injury that kept him out for three months. He made his return from injury, coming on as a 71st-minute substitute, in a 2–0 win against Guiseley on 13 November 2021. Following this, Vincent regained his first team place, playing in the midfield position. At the end of the 2021–22 season, he made making 27 appearances in the league for Hereford. On 10 May 2022, Vincent was released by the club.

=== FC United of Manchester ===
On 7 June 2022, Vincent joined Northern Premier League Premier Division side F.C. United of Manchester.

He made his debut for the club, starting the whole game, in a 4–1 win against Belper Town in the opening game of the season. Vincent scored his first goal for FC United of Manchester, in a 2–1 win against Marske United in what turned out to be last appearance for the club. After leaving FC United of Manchester, he made seventeen appearances and scoring once in all competitions.

=== Stockport Town ===
On 31 March 2023, Vincent signed for North West Counties League Division One South side Stockport Town. By the time, he also moved to full time coaching at his former club, Stockport County.

He made his debut for the club, starting the whole game, in a 3–1 loss against Sandbach United on 1 April 2023. At the end of the 2022–23 season, Vincent made three appearances in all competitions.

The 2023–24 season saw Vincent score his first goal of the season, in a 3–2 win against Stockport Georgians. The following month saw him score two goals against Eccleshall and Ashville. On 4 November 2023, he scored his fourth goal for Stockport Town, in a 3–2 win against Market Drayton Town. At the end of the 2023–24 season, Vincent made thirty–four appearances and scoring four goals in all competitions.

By the end of 2024, Vincent announced that he had retired from playing professional football.

== International career ==
In November 2011, Vincent was called up by the England C national team, but did not play. In May 2012, he was called up to the England C squad for the second time. On 5 June 2012, Vincent made his debut for the national team, starting the whole game, in a 4–0 loss against Russia U21. Two months later, he was called up by England C, but did not again. Reflecting on playing for England C, Vincent said: "It doesn’t matter how many times you are called up to represent your country, it is always an incredibly proud moment. If you play non-league then to be called up to England C is the pinnacle and something I will always relish."

In August 2013, Vincent was called up England C team for the last time, but he did not play. The following month, Vincent was monitored by Northern Ireland national team national team manager Michael O'Neill, over his eligibility to play for Northern Ireland however Vincent was not eligible.

== Personal life ==
Vincent is married and together, they have one daughter.

== Career statistics ==
As of match played 12 August 2024

Appearances and goals by club, season and competition
| Club | Season | League | | | National cup | | League cup | | Other | | Total | |
| Club | Season | Division | Apps | Goals | Apps | Goals | Apps | Goals | Apps | Goals | Apps | Goals |
|---|---|---|---|---|---|---|---|---|---|---|---|---|
| Stockport County | 2007–08 | League Two | 1 | 0 | 0 | 0 | 0 | 0 | 0 | 0 | 1 | 0 |
| Stockport County | 2008–09 | League One | 16 | 2 | 1 | 1 | 0 | 0 | 2 (Note: Appearance(s) in Football League Trophy) | 0 | 19 | 3 |
| Stockport County | 2009–10 | League One | 34 | 0 | 2 | 0 | 1 | 0 | 2 | 0 | 39 | 0 |
| Stockport County | 2010–11 | League Two | 20 | 0 | 0 | 0 | 0 | 0 | 0 | 0 | 20 | 0 |
| Stockport County | Total | | 71 | 2 | 3 | 1 | 1 | 0 | 4 | 0 | 79 | 3 |
| Kidderminster Harriers | 2011–12 | Conference Premier | 28 | 3 | 0 | 0 | 0 | 0 | 0 | 0 | 28 | 3 |
| Kidderminster Harriers | 2012–13 | Conference Premier | 39 | 3 | 1 | 0 | 0 | 0 | 1 (Note: Appearance(s) in Football Conference play-offs) | 0 | 41 | 3 |
| Kidderminster Harriers | Total | | 67 | 6 | 1 | 0 | 0 | 0 | 1 | 0 | 69 | 6 |
| Inverness Caledonian Thistle | 2013–14 | Scottish Premiership | 21 | 1 | 3 | 0 | 3 | 0 | 0 | 0 | 27 | 1 |
| Inverness Caledonian Thistle | 2014–15 | Scottish Premiership | 22 | 1 | 4 | 1 | 0 | 0 | 0 | 0 | 23 | 2 |
| Inverness Caledonian Thistle | 2015–16 | Scottish Premiership | 16 | 2 | 0 | 0 | 2 | 0 | 0 | 0 | 18 | 2 |
| Inverness Caledonian Thistle | Total | | 57 | 4 | 7 | 1 | 5 | 0 | 0 | 0 | 69 | 5 |
| Dundee | 2016–17 | Scottish Premiership | 28 | 0 | 0 | 0 | 4 | 0 | 0 | 0 | 32 | 0 |
| Dundee | 2017–18 | Scottish Premiership | 3 | 0 | 0 | 0 | 2 | 0 | 0 | 0 | 5 | 0 |
| Dundee | Total | | 31 | 0 | 0 | 0 | 6 | 0 | 0 | 0 | 37 | 0 |
| Dunfermline Athletic (loan) | 2017–18 | Scottish Championship | 10 | 0 | 0 | 0 | 0 | 0 | 2 | 0 | 12 | 0 |
| Dunfermline Athletic (loan) | 2018–19 | Scottish Championship | 26 | 1 | 1 | 0 | 3 | 1 | 2 | 0 | 32 | 2 |
| Dunfermline Athletic (loan) | Total | | 36 | 1 | 1 | 0 | 3 | 1 | 4 | 0 | 44 | 2 |
| Inverness Caledonian Thistle | 2019–20 | Scottish Championship | 19 | 2 | 2 | 0 | 4 | 0 | 3 (Note: Appearance(s) in Scottish Challenge Cup) | 0 | 28 | 2 |
| Inverness Caledonian Thistle | 2020–21 | Scottish Championship | 6 | 0 | 0 | 0 | 2 | 0 | 0 | 0 | 8 | 0 |
| Inverness Caledonian Thistle | Total | | 25 | 2 | 2 | 0 | 6 | 0 | 3 | 0 | 36 | 2 |
| Hereford | 2021–22 | National League North | 27 | 0 | 1 | 0 | — | | 1 | 0 | 29 | 0 |
| FC United of Manchester | 2022–23 | Northern Premier League; Premier Division | 16 | 1 | 0 | 0 | — | | 1 | 0 | 17 | 0 |
| Stockport Town | 2023–24 | North West Counties League; Division One South | 28 | 4 | 1 | 0 | — | | 5 (Note: One ppearance in FA Vase, one appearance in NWCFL Challenge Cup, one appearance in Cheshire Senior Cup and two appearances in NWCFL Division One South play-offs) | 0 | 34 | 4 |
| Stockport Town | 2024–25 | North West Counties League; Premier Division | 4 | 0 | 0 | 0 | — | | 0 | 0 | 4 | 0 |
| Stockport Town | Total | | 32 | 4 | 1 | 0 | 0 | 0 | 5 | 0 | 38 | 4 |
| Career total | | | 362 | 20 | 16 | 2 | 21 | 1 | 19 | 0 | 417 | 22 |

== Honours ==
Inverness Caledonian Thistle

- Scottish Cup: 2014–15
- Scottish Challenge Cup: 2019-2020
- Scottish League Cup: Runner Up: 2013-2014
