= Teijsse =

Teijsse is a surname. Notable people with the surname include:

- Kenny Teijsse (born 1992), Dutch footballer
- Yordi Teijsse (born 1992), Dutch footballer, Kenny's twin brother
