= Julen Etxabeguren =

Spanish footballer

Personal information
- Full name: Julen Etxabeguren Leanizbarrutia
- Date of birth: 7 March 1991 (age 35)
- Place of birth: Madrid, Spain
- Height: 1.89 m (6 ft 2 in)
- Position: Centre back

Team information
- Current team: Beasain
- Number: 5

Youth career
- Real Sociedad

Senior career*
Years	Team	Apps	(Gls)
2010–2014	Real Sociedad B	91	(4)
2014–2015	East Fife	13	(0)
2015–2018	Dundee	41	(0)
2018–2019	Real Unión	31	(0)
2019–	Beasain	69	(3)
- * Club domestic league appearances and goals as of 17:00, 8 January 2023 (UTC)

Julen Etxabeguren Leanizbarrutia (born 7 March 1991) is a Spanish footballer who plays as a centre back for SD Beasain.

Etxabeguren started his career in his native Basque Country with Real Sociedad, but did not break into their first team. He moved to Scotland in 2014 to study and signed for East Fife. After playing for East Fife in Scottish League Two for six months, he signed a contract with Scottish Premiership side Dundee.

== Career ==
=== Real Sociedad ===
After coming through the youth system at Real Sociedad, Etxabeguren progressed to their B-team where he was a regular for four years. In the 2013–14 season, he trained with the first team during pre-season and was named in their Champions League squad. He was then affected by injury. Despite being offered a new contract, he decided to give up football.

=== East Fife ===
Etxabeguren moved to Scotland to study for a master's degree in electronic engineering at the University of Edinburgh. When he had nearly concluded that course, he considered resuming his football career. Etxabeguren signed for semi-professional club East Fife, playing in Scottish League Two, in December 2014. This was considered a surprising move for a player who had been at a relatively high level. Etxabeguren quickly became a cult hero with the Methil club, with his arrival coinciding with an improvement in the team's form.

=== Dundee ===
On 2 June 2015, Dundee confirmed that Etxabeguren had signed a three-year deal with the club and would begin pre-season training in July. He became a regular in the side, featuring in 40 Scottish Premiership matches between July 2015 and March 2017 despite needing surgery on an eye injury in January 2016, but then ruptured his achilles tendon in a match against Partick Thistle which resulted in a seven-month layoff. After returning in October 2017, he only made one appearance from the bench before sustaining a dislocated shoulder. Etxabeguren was released by Dundee at the end of the season.

== Career statistics ==
As of match played 1 July 2019

Appearances and goals by club, season and competition
Club	Season	League			National Cup		League Cup		Other		Total	
Club	Season	Division	Apps	Goals	Apps	Goals	Apps	Goals	Apps	Goals	Apps	Goals
Real Sociedad B	2010–11	Segunda División B	9	0	—		—		—		9	0
Real Sociedad B	2011–12	Segunda División B	29	2	—		—		—		29	2
Real Sociedad B	2012–13	Segunda División B	30	1	—		—		—		30	1
Real Sociedad B	2013–14	Segunda División B	23	1	—		—		—		23	1
Real Sociedad B	Total		91	4	0	0	0	0	0	0	91	4
East Fife	2014–15	Scottish League Two	13	0	0	0	0	0	2 (Note: Appearances in the League One play-offs)	0	15	0
Dundee	2015–16	Scottish Premiership	23	0	2	0	1	0	—		26	0
Dundee	2016–17	Scottish Premiership	17	0	1	0	4	1	—		22	1
Dundee	2017–18	Scottish Premiership	1	0	0	0	0	0	—		1	0
Dundee	Total		41	0	3	0	5	1	0	0	49	1
Real Unión	2018–19	Segunda División B	31	0	0	0	0	0	0	0	31	0
Career total			176	4	3	0	5	1	2	0	186	5
