= 2014–15 Inverness Caledonian Thistle F.C. season =

Scottish football club season

Inverness Caledonian Thistle
2014–15 season
- Chairman: Kenny Cameron
- Manager: John Hughes
- Stadium: Caledonian Stadium
- Premiership: Third place
- League Cup: Second round lost to Rangers
- Scottish Cup: Winners
- Top goalscorer: League: Billy McKay (10); All: Billy McKay (10)
- Highest home attendance: 6,614 v. Aberdeen, 28 December 2014
- Lowest home attendance: 2,426 v. Dundee United, 5 May 2015
- Average home league attendance: 3,733
Home colours	Away colours

The 2014–15 season is Inverness Caledonian Thistle's fifth consecutive season in the top flight of Scottish football and the second in the newly established Scottish Premiership, having been promoted from the Scottish First Division at the end of the 2009–10 season. Inverness also compete in the League Cup and the Scottish Cup.

== Results & Fixtures ==
Win Draw Loss Postponed

=== Pre-season ===
2 July 2014 Friendly	Clachnacuddin	0–4	Inverness Caledonian Thistle	Grant Street Park, Inverness
19.30		Report	Danny Williams; Trialist; Gordon Morrison (o.g.); Graeme Shinnie

5 July 2014 Friendly	Fort William	2–6	Inverness Caledonian Thistle	Claggan Park, Fort William
13.00	Iain MacLellan; Michael Ellis	Report	Calum Ferguson; Chris Blackett; Jaime Wilson; Ryan Baptie

9 July 2014 Friendly	Forres Mechanics	0–5	Inverness Caledonian Thistle	Mosset Park, Forres
19.30		Report	Greg Tansey 20'; Daniel Devine 38'; Nick Ross 43'; Calum Ferguson 73'; Billy McKay 90'

12 July 2014 Friendly	Elgin City	1–2	Inverness Caledonian Thistle	Borough Briggs, Elgin
15.00	Craig Gunn 4'	Report	Billy McKay 24'; Marley Watkins 74'	Attendance: 533

16 July 2014 Friendly	Brora Rangers	0–2	Inverness Caledonian Thistle	Dudgeon Park, Brora
19.30		Report	James Vincent 10' (pen.); Marley Watkins 64'

19 July 2014 Friendly	Rothes	2–3	Inverness Caledonian Thistle	Mackessack Park, Rothes
13.00	Callum McIntosh	Report	Calum Ferguson ?

19 July 2014 Friendly	Raith Rovers	0–1	Inverness Caledonian Thistle	Stark's Park, Kirkcaldy
15.00		Report	Ryan Christie 83'

23 July 2014 Friendly	Deveronvale	0–3	Inverness Caledonian Thistle	Princess Royal Park, Banff
19.30		Report	Bryan Bell (Trialist) 44' (own goal); Ryan Christie 68'; Billy McKay 87'

27 July 2014 Friendly	Inverness Caledonian Thistle	2–1	Fleetwood Town (England)	Caledonian Stadium, Inverness
14.30	Billy McKay 44'; James Vincent 61'	Report	Nathan Pond 56'

30 July 2014 North of Scotland Cup	Clachnacuddin	2–1	Inverness Caledonian Thistle	Grant Street Park, Inverness
19.30	David Watson 59'; Andrew Skinner 67'	Report	Ryan Baptie 7'

2 August 2014 Friendly	(England) Birmingham City	3–1	Inverness Caledonian Thistle	St Andrew's stadium, Birmingham
15.00	Lee Novak 8'; Demarai Gray 38'; Paul Caddis 89' (pen.)	Report	Gary Warren 74'	Attendance: 4,444

=== Scottish Premiership ===
9 August 2014 Scottish Premiership	Hamilton Academical	0–2	Inverness Caledonian Thistle	New Douglas Park, Hamilton
15.00		BBC Report	Billy McKay 10'; Ryan Christie 25'	Attendance: 1,622; Referee: Robertson

13 August 2014 Scottish Premiership	Inverness Caledonian Thistle	0–0	Dundee	Caledonian Stadium, Inverness
19.45		BBC Report		Attendance: 3,082; Referee: Finnie

16 August 2014 Scottish Premiership	Motherwell	0–2	Inverness Caledonian Thistle	Fir Park, Motherwell
15.00		BBC Report	Greg Tansey 42'; Aaron Doran 89'	Attendance: 3,732; Referee: McLean

23 August 2014 Scottish Premiership	Inverness Caledonian Thistle	1–0	Celtic	Caledonian Stadium, Inverness
12.30	Eoghan O'Connell 65' (o.g.)	BBC Report		Attendance: 5,862; Referee: Madden

30 August 2014 Scottish Premiership	Inverness Caledonian Thistle	2–0	Kilmarnock	Caledonian Stadium, Inverness
15.00	Aaron Doran 75'; Greg Tansey 80'	BBC Report		Attendance: 3,830; Referee: Beaton

13 September 2014 Scottish Premiership	Partick Thistle	3–1	Inverness Caledonian Thistle	Firhill Stadium, Glasgow
15.00	Steven Lawless 19'; Abdul Osman 23'; Kallum Higginbotham 72'	BBC Report	Aaron Doran 13'	Attendance: 2,917; Referee: Finnie

20 September 2014 Scottish Premiership	Inverness Caledonian Thistle	2–1	St Johnstone	Caledonian Stadium, Inverness
15.00	Marley Watkins 61'; Ryan Christie 66'	BBC Report	Brian Graham 78'	Attendance: 2,770; Referee: Murray

27 September 2014 Scottish Premiership	Aberdeen	3–2	Inverness Caledonian Thistle	Pittodrie Stadium, Aberdeen
15.00	Adam Rooney 24'; Shay Logan 40'; Jonny Hayes 59'	BBC Report	Josh Meekings 16'; Marley Watkins 50'	Attendance: 11,414; Referee: Beaton

5 October 2014 Scottish Premiership	Inverness Caledonian Thistle	1–1	Ross County	Caledonian Stadium, Inverness
12.45	Marley Watkins 49'	BBC Report	Yoann Arquin 21'	Attendance: 3,741; Referee: Thomson

18 October 2014 Scottish Premiership	St Mirren	0–1	Inverness Caledonian Thistle	St Mirren Park, Paisley
15.00		BBC Report	Greg Tansey 43' (pen.); Ryan Christie (red card) 50'	Attendance: 3,109; Referee: Collum

25 October 2014 Scottish Premiership	Inverness Caledonian Thistle	1–0	Dundee United	Caledonian Stadium, Inverness
15.00	Marley Watkins 10'	BBC Report		Attendance: 3,508; Referee: Clancy

1 November 2014 Scottish Premiership	Celtic	1–0	Inverness Caledonian Thistle	Celtic Park, Glasgow
15.00	John Guidetti 49'	BBC Report		Attendance: 42,553; Referee: Thomson

8 November 2014 Scottish Premiership	Inverness Caledonian Thistle	4–2	Hamilton Academical	Caledonian Stadium, Inverness
15.00	Billy McKay 25' 68'; Gary Warren 59'; James Vincent 78'	BBC Report	Tony Andreu 17' 72'	Attendance: 3,022; Referee: Collum

22 November 2014 Scottish Premiership	Inverness Caledonian Thistle	3–1	Motherwell	Caledonian Stadium, Inverness
15.00	Billy McKay 29'; Marley Watkins 71'; Josh Meekings 78'	BBC Report	Henrik Ojamaa 31'	Attendance: 3,037; Referee: Madden

6 December 2014 Scottish Premiership	Dundee	1–2	Inverness Caledonian Thistle	Dens Park, Dundee
15.00	Greg Stewart 21'	BBC Report	Billy McKay 55'; Ryan Christie 88'	Attendance: 5,400; Referee: Collum

13 December 2014 Scottish Premiership	Inverness Caledonian Thistle	0–4	Partick Thistle	Caledonian Stadium, Inverness
15.00		BBC Report	Ryan Stevenson 12' 40'; Gary Fraser 49'; Conrad Balatoni 56'	Attendance: 2,723; Referee: Beaton

20 December 2014 Scottish Premiership	St Johnstone	1–0	Inverness Caledonian Thistle	McDiarmid Park, Perth
15.00	Brian Graham 62' (pen.)	BBC Report	Ross Draper (red card) 67'	Attendance: 2,891; Referee: Colvin

28 December 2014 Scottish Premiership	Inverness Caledonian Thistle	0–1	Aberdeen	Caledonian Stadium, Inverness
15.00		BBC Report	Peter Pawlett 12'	Attendance: 6,614; Referee: Murray

1 January 2015 Scottish Premiership	Ross County	1–3	Inverness Caledonian Thistle	Victoria Park, Dingwall
15.00	Jackson Irvine 60'	BBC Report	Aaron Doran 27' 58'; Billy McKay 73'	Attendance: 4,887; Referee: McLean

4 January 2015 Scottish Premiership	Inverness Caledonian Thistle	1–0	St Mirren	Caledonian Stadium, Inverness
15.00	Billy McKay 77'	BBC Report		Attendance: 2,751; Referee: Madden

10 January 2015 Scottish Premiership	Kilmarnock	1–2	Inverness Caledonian Thistle	Rugby Park, Kilmarnock
15.00	Alexei Eremenko 47' (pen.)	BBC Report	David Raven (red card) 47'; Billy McKay 53' 81'	Attendance: 2,793; Referee: Robertson

17 January 2015 Scottish Premiership	Dundee United	P – P	Inverness Caledonian Thistle	Tannadice Park, Dundee
15.00		BBC Report		Referee: Thomson

20 January 2015 Scottish Premiership	Inverness Caledonian Thistle	2–0	St Johnstone	Caledonian Stadium, Inverness
19.45	Billy McKay 34'; Marley Watkins 41'	BBC Report		Attendance: 3,161; Referee: Clancy

24 January 2015 Scottish Premiership	Hamilton Academical	0–2	Inverness Caledonian Thistle	New Douglas Park, Hamilton
15.00		BBC Report	Grant Gillespie 53' (o.g.); Nick Ross 76'	Attendance: 5,089; Referee: Colvin

31 January 2015 Scottish Premiership	Inverness Caledonian Thistle	1–1	Ross County	Caledonian Stadium, Inverness
15.00	Marley Watkins 38'	BBC Report	Gary Warren 76' (o.g.)	Attendance: 4,021; Referee: Beaton

14 February 2015 Scottish Premiership	St Mirren	1–2	Inverness Caledonian Thistle	St Mirren Park, Paisley
15.00	Jim Goodwin 68'	BBC Report	Greg Tansey 3'; Ryan Christie 60'	Attendance: 3,154; Referee: Madden

21 February 2015 Scottish Premiership	Inverness Caledonian Thistle	3–3	Kilmarnock	Caledonian Stadium, Inverness
15.00	Graeme Shinnie 18'; Nick Ross 33'; Danny Williams 52'	BBC Report	Nathan Eccleston 20'; Craig Slater 45'; Tope Obadeyi 61'	Attendance: 2,912; Referee: McLean

24 February 2015 Scottish Premiership	Dundee United	1–1	Inverness Caledonian Thistle	Tannadice Park, Dundee
19.45	Michal Szromnik (red card) 6'; Ryan McGowan 74'	BBC Report	Greg Tansey 9' (pen.); Gary Warren (red card) 90'	Attendance: 7,276; Referee: Murray

28 February 2015 Scottish Premiership	Motherwell	2–1	Inverness Caledonian Thistle	Fir Park, Motherwell
15.00	Louis Laing 48'; Lionel Ainsworth 84'	BBC Report	Edward Ofere 76'	Attendance: 3,508; Referee: Muir

21 March 2015 Scottish Premiership	Partick Thistle	1–0	Inverness Caledonian Thistle	Firhill Stadium, Glasgow
15.00	Steven Lawless 84'	BBC Report		Attendance: 2,603; Referee: McLean

4 April 2015 Scottish Premiership	Inverness Caledonian Thistle	1–1	Dundee	Caledonian Stadium, Inverness
15.00	Graeme Shinnie 55'	BBC Report	David Clarkson 53'	Attendance: 3,362; Referee: Collum

8 April 2015 Scottish Premiership	Aberdeen	1–0	Inverness Caledonian Thistle	Pittodrie Stadium, Aberdeen
19.45	Ash Taylor 47'	BBC Report		Attendance: 11,319; Referee: Murray

11 April 2015 Scottish Premiership	Inverness Caledonian Thistle	1–1	Celtic	Caledonian Stadium, Inverness
12.45	Edward Ofere 4'	BBC Report	Leigh Griffiths 3'	Attendance: 6,059; Referee: Thomson

25 April 2015 Scottish Premiership	Inverness Caledonian Thistle	1–2	Aberdeen	Caledonian Stadium, Inverness
15.00	Edward Ofere 48'	BBC Report	David Raven 69' (o.g.); Niall McGinn 74'	Attendance: 4,530; Referee: Allan

2 May 2015 Scottish Premiership	St Johnstone	1–1	Inverness Caledonian Thistle	McDiarmid Park, Perth
15.00	Brian Graham 82'	BBC Report	Aaron Doran 55'; David Raven (red card) 85'	Attendance: 2,986; Referee: Dallas

5 May 2015 Scottish Premiership	Inverness Caledonian Thistle	2–1	Dundee United	Caledonian Stadium, Inverness
19.45	Edward Ofere 38'; Danny Williams 43'	BBC Report	Robbie Muirhead 2'	Attendance: 2,426; Referee: Murray

9 May 2015 Scottish Premiership	Dundee	0–1	Inverness Caledonian Thistle	Dens Park, Dundee
15.00		BBC Report	Edward Ofere 8'	Attendance: 5,123; Referee: Robertson

16 May 2015 Scottish Premiership	Inverness Caledonian Thistle	3–0	Dundee United	Caledonian Stadium, Inverness
15.00	Josh Meekings 55'; Nick Ross 80'; Gary Warren 83'	BBC Report		Attendance: 3,508; Referee: Thomson

24 May 2015 Scottish Premiership	Celtic	5–0	Inverness Caledonian Thistle	Celtic Park, Glasgow
12.30	Stefan Scepovic 5' 70'; Stefan Johansen 18'; Leigh Griffiths 80'; Kris Commons 90'	BBC Report		Attendance: 55,638; Referee: Clancy

For upcoming Scottish Premiership fixtures, see the official Inverness Caledonian Thistle F.C. website

=== Scottish League Cup ===
16 September 2014 Round 2	Rangers	1–0	Inverness Caledonian Thistle	Ibrox Stadium, Glasgow
19.45	Lewis Macleod 78'	BBC Report		Attendance: 15,208; Referee: Allan

=== Scottish Cup ===
29 November 2014 Fourth Round	St Mirren	1–1	Inverness Caledonian Thistle	St Mirren Park, Paisley
15.00	Marc McAusland 17'	BBC Report	Josh Meekings 63'	Attendance: 1,957; Referee: Murray

2 December 2014 Fourth Round replay	Inverness Caledonian Thistle	4–0	St Mirren	Caledonian Stadium, Inverness
19.45	Gary Warren 20'; Greg Tansey 23' (pen.); Danny Williams 67'; Graeme Shinnie 90'	BBC Report		Attendance: 1,326; Referee: Murray

7 February 2015 Fifth Round	Partick Thistle	1–2	Inverness Caledonian Thistle	Firhill Stadium, Glasgow
15.00	Lyle Taylor 67'	BBC Report	Marley Watkins 16'; Greg Tansey 27'	Attendance: 2,915; Referee: Collum

7 March 2015 Quarter-final	Inverness Caledonian Thistle	P – P	Raith Rovers	Caledonian Stadium, Inverness
15.00		BBC Report		Referee: Collum

10 March 2015 Quarter-final	Inverness Caledonian Thistle	1–0	Raith Rovers	Caledonian Stadium, Inverness
19.45	Daniel Devine 63'	BBC Report		Attendance: 2,276; Referee: Allan

19 April 2015 Semi-final	Inverness Caledonian Thistle	3–2 (a.e.t.)	Celtic	Hampden Park, Glasgow
12.15	Greg Tansey 58' (pen.); Edward Ofere 96'; David Raven 117'	BBC Report	Virgil van Dijk 18'; Craig Gordon (red card) 55'; John Guidetti 103'	Attendance: 28,643; Referee: McLean

30 May 2015 Final	Inverness Caledonian Thistle	2–1	Falkirk	Hampden Park, Glasgow
15.00	Marley Watkins 38'; Carl Tremarco (red card) 75'; James Vincent 86'	BBC Report	Peter Grant 80'	Attendance: 37,149; Referee: Collum

== Player statistics ==
=== Captains ===
No.	P	Name	Country	No. games	Notes
3	DF	Graeme Shinnie	(Scotland)	43	
5	DF	Gary Warren	(England)	2	
9	MF	Richie Foran	(Republic of Ireland)	0	Club captain

Last updated: 30 May 2015
Source: Competitive match reports.
Competitive matches only
Matches started as captain only
Country: FIFA nationality; No.: Squad number; P: Position; Name: Player name; No. Games: Number of games started as captain.

=== Appearances & Goals ===
Includes all competitive matches.
Last updated 30 May 2015

No.	Pos	Nat	Player	Total		Premiership		League Cup		Scottish Cup	
No.	Pos	Nat	Player	Apps	Goals	Apps	Goals	Apps	Goals	Apps	Goals
1	GK	(Scotland) SCO	Ryan Esson	20	0	14+2	0	0	0	4	0
2	DF	(England) ENG	David Raven	39	1	33	0	1	0	5	1
3	DF	(Scotland) SCO	Graeme Shinnie	43	3	37	2	0	0	6	1
4	MF	(England) ENG	James Vincent	24	2	13+7	1	0	0	3+1	1
5	DF	(England) ENG	Gary Warren	41	3	36	2	1	0	4	1
6	DF	(England) ENG	Josh Meekings	44	4	37	3	1	0	6	1
7	FW	(Nigeria) NGR	Edward Ofere	13	6	7+3	5	0	0	3	1
8	MF	(England) ENG	Ross Draper	38	0	31+1	0	0	0	6	0
10	MF	(Republic of Ireland) IRL	Aaron Doran	38	6	15+18	6	1	0	1+3	0
11	MF	(Scotland) SCO	Nick Ross	32	3	13+13	3	0	0	2+4	0
12	GK	(England) ENG	Dean Brill	27	0	24	0	1	0	2	0
13	FW	(England) ENG	Ibra Sekajja	4	0	0+4	0	0	0	0	0
14	DF	(Northern Ireland) NIR	Daniel Devine	11	1	6+2	0	0	0	2+1	1
15	MF	(England) ENG	Marley Watkins	39	9	29+4	7	1	0	5	2
16	MF	(England) ENG	Greg Tansey	42	7	36	4	1	0	5	3
17	MF	(England) ENG	Lewis Horner	2	0	1+1	0	0	0	0	0
18	DF	(England) ENG	Carl Tremarco	13	0	9+2	0	1	0	1	0
19	MF	(England) ENG	Danny Williams	41	3	27+7	2	1	0	5+1	1
20	MF	(Scotland) SCO	Liam Polworth	6	0	1+4	0	1	0	0	0
22	MF	(Scotland) SCO	Ryan Christie	42	4	26+9	4	0+1	0	4+2	0
25	FW	(Estonia) EST	Tarmo Kink	6	0	1+4	0	0	0	0+1	0
31	GK	(Scotland) SCO	Cameron Mackay	1	0	0+1	0	0	0	0	0
37	FW	(Scotland) SCO	Alisdair Sutherland	2	0	0+2	0	0	0	0	0
39	FW	(Canada) CAN	Calum Ferguson	2	0	0+2	0	0	0	0	0
	FW	(Northern Ireland) NIR	Billy McKay	26	10	22+1	10	1	0	2	0

=== Hat-tricks ===
Player	Competition	Score	Opponent	Date
(Canada) Calum Ferguson	Friendly	2–6	Fort William	5 July 2014

=== Disciplinary record ===
Includes all competitive matches.
Last updated 30 May 2015

Number	Nation	Position	Name	Total		Premiership		League Cup		Scottish Cup	
Number	Nation	Position	Name	Yellow card	Red card	Yellow card	Red card	Yellow card	Red card	Yellow card	Red card
2	(England)	DF	David Raven	6	2	6	2	0	0	0	0
3	(Scotland)	DF	Graeme Shinnie	5	0	4	0	0	0	1	0
4	(England)	MF	James Vincent	1	0	1	0	0	0	0	0
5	(England)	DF	Gary Warren	6	1	4	1	0	0	2	0
6	(England)	DF	Josh Meekings	4	0	4	0	0	0	0	0
7	(Nigeria)	FW	Edward Ofere	3	0	3	0	0	0	0	0
8	(England)	MF	Ross Draper	13	1	12	1	0	0	1	0
10	(Republic of Ireland)	MF	Aaron Doran	3	0	2	0	1	0	0	0
11	(Scotland)	MF	Nick Ross	2	0	1	0	0	0	1	0
14	(Northern Ireland)	DF	Daniel Devine	3	0	3	0	0	0	0	0
15	(England)	MF	Marley Watkins	8	0	7	0	0	0	1	0
16	(England)	MF	Greg Tansey	9	0	8	0	1	0	0	0
18	(England)	DF	Carl Tremarco	2	1	2	0	0	0	0	1
19	(England)	MF	Danny Williams	2	0	1	0	0	0	1	0
22	(Scotland)	MF	Ryan Christie	3	1	3	1	0	0	0	0

== Team statistics ==
=== League table ===
Pos	Team	Pld	W	D	L	GF	GA	GD	Pts	Qualification or relegation
1	Celtic (C)	38	29	5	4	84	17	+67	92	Qualification for the Champions League second qualifying round
2	Aberdeen	38	23	6	9	57	33	+24	75	Qualification for the Europa League first qualifying round
3	Inverness Caledonian Thistle	38	19	8	11	52	42	+10	65	Qualification for the Europa League second qualifying round (Note: Inverness Caledonian Thistle qualified for the second qualifying round of the UEFA Europa League by winning the 2014–15 Scottish Cup.)
4	St Johnstone	38	16	9	13	34	34	0	57	Qualification for the Europa League first qualifying round
5	Dundee United	38	17	5	16	58	56	+2	56	

Source: SPFL
Rules for classification: 1) points; 2) goal difference; 3) number of goals scored
(C) Champions

=== Position summary ===
Round	1	2	3	4	5	6	7	8	9	10	11	12	13	14	15	16	17	18	19	20	21	22	23	24	25	26	27	28	29	30	31	32	33	34	35	36	37	38
Ground	A	H	A	H	H	A	H	A	H	A	H	A	H	H	A	H	A	H	A	H	A	H	A	H	A	H	A	A	A	H	A	H	H	A	H	A	H	A
Result	W	D	W	W	W	L	W	L	D	W	W	L	W	W	W	L	L	L	W	W	W	W	W	D	W	D	D	L	L	D	L	D	L	D	W	W	W	L
Position	1	2	1	1	1	2	1	3	3	3	2	4	1	2	2	2	4	5	5	5	3	3	3	3	3	3	3	3	3	3	3	3	3	3	3	3	3	3

Updated to match(es) played on 24 May 2015. Source:
A = Away; H = Home; W = Win; D = Draw; L = Loss

=== Personnel Awards ===
Last updated 24 May 2015

Player	Award	Month
(England) Ross Draper	SPFL Player of the Month	August
(Scotland) John Hughes	SPFL Manager of the Month	August
(Scotland) Ryan Christie	SPFL Young Player of the Month	August
(Scotland) John Hughes	SPFL Manager of the Month	January
(Scotland) Ryan Christie	SPFL Young Player of the Month	February
(Scotland) John Hughes	PFA Scotland Manager of the Year	
(Scotland) Ryan Christie	SFWA Young Player of the Year	
(Scotland) John Hughes	SFWA Manager of the Year	

== Transfers ==
Transfers In
Player	Age*	Pos	From	Fee	Date
(England) Lewis Horner	22	MF	(England) Blyth Spartans	Free	8 August 2014
(Uganda) Ibra Sekajja	21	ST	Free Agent	N/A	7 October 2014
(Nigeria) Edward Ofere	28	ST	Free Agent	N/A	27 February 2015
(Estonia) Tarmo Kink	29	MF	Free Agent	N/A	2 March 2015

Transfers Out
Player	Age*	Pos	To	Fee	Date
(England) Nick Draper	20	GK	Released	N/A	1 July 2014
(Republic of Ireland) Joe Gorman	19	DF	(Republic of Ireland) Bray Wanderers	Free	1 July 2014
(Scotland) Matthew Cooper	20	DF	(Scotland) Elgin City	Free	1 July 2014
(Republic of Ireland) Conor Pepper	20	DF	(Scotland) Greenock Morton	Free	1 July 2014
(Scotland) Jay Cheyne	19	DF	(Scotland) Buckie Thistle	Free	1 July 2014
(Republic of Ireland) Adam Evans	20	MF	(Republic of Ireland) Bohemian	Free	3 July 2014
(England) Ben Greenhalgh	22	ST	(England) Maidstone United	Free	10 August 2014
(Uganda) Ibra Sekajja	22	ST	(Scotland) Livingston	Free	16 January 2015
(Northern Ireland) Billy Mckay	26	ST	(England) Wigan Athletic	£150,000	30 January 2015

== See also ==
- List of Inverness Caledonian Thistle F.C. seasons
