= Danny Williams (footballer, born 1988) =

British association football player

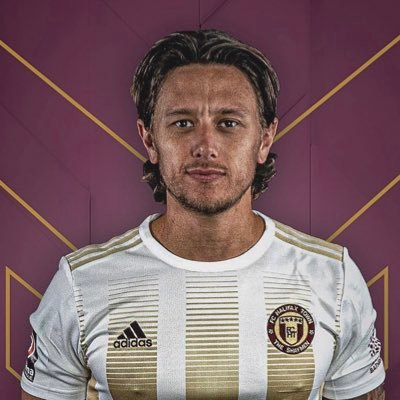
- Williams in 2020

Personal information
- Date of birth: 25 January 1988 (age 38)
- Place of birth: Wigan, England
- Position: Left winger

Senior career*
Years	Team	Apps	(Gls)
2007–2008	Daisy Hill		
2008–2010	FC United of Manchester	30	(2)
2010–2011	Clitheroe	69	(17)
2011–2013	Kendal Town	79	(9)
2012–2013	→ Chester (loan)	28	(2)
2013–2016	Inverness Caledonian Thistle	88	(4)
2016–2017	Dundee	25	(0)
2018–2019	Accrington Stanley	2	(0)
2018–2019	→ AFC Fylde (loan)	6	(0)
2019–2021	FC Halifax Town	54	(1)
- * Club domestic league appearances and goals as of 20:10, 15 May 2021 (UTC)

Danny Williams (born 25 January 1988) is an English football coach and former player who played as a left winger.

Williams spent his early career in the English non-league, playing for Daisy Hill, FC United of Manchester, Clitheroe, Kendal Town and Chester. He turned professional in 2013 with Scottish club Inverness Caledonian Thistle, and also spent time at Dundee, before returning to England in 2018 with Accrington Stanley. He later spent time back in the English non-league with AFC Fylde and FC Halifax Town.

== Playing career ==
Williams moved from Clitheroe to Kendal Town in February 2011, having previously played for Daisy Hill and FC United of Manchester. At FC United he had scored two goals in 33 appearances in all competitions. He joined Chester on loan in October 2012, scoring two goals in 28 appearances in the Conference North.

He was linked with a move to Scottish club Inverness Caledonian Thistle in May 2013, and the move was finalised in August 2013. Despite a slow start to his career at the start of the season, Williams signed a new two-year contract with the club. On 14 January 2014, Williams scored his first professional goal, as Inverness Caledonian Thistle beat Aberdeen 1–0. Williams came on as a substitute as Inverness won the 2015 Scottish Cup Final.

On 22 March 2016, Dundee announced that Williams had signed a pre-contract agreement with the club along with fellow Inverness teammate James Vincent. Williams left Dundee in November 2017, and signed for Accrington Stanley in January 2018. He was offered a new contract by Accrington at the end of the 2017–18 season. He moved on loan to AFC Fylde in October 2018.

He was released by Accrington at the end of the 2018–19 season. He signed for FC Halifax Town in August 2019.

== Coaching career ==
In August 2022, Williams joined UAE-based Dubai City as a coach.

== Career statistics ==
As of 15 May 2021

Appearances and goals by club, season and competition
Club	Season	League			FA Cup		League Cup		Other		Total	
Club	Season	Division	Apps	Goals	Apps	Goals	Apps	Goals	Apps	Goals	Apps	Goals
Chester (loan)	2012–13	Conference North	28	2	0	0	0	0	5 (Note: Appearances in Cheshire Senior Cup)	0	33	2
Inverness Caledonian Thistle	2013–14	Scottish Premiership	20	1	3	0	1	0	—		24	1
Inverness Caledonian Thistle	2014–15	Scottish Premiership	34	2	6	1	1	0	—		41	3
Inverness Caledonian Thistle	2015–16	Scottish Premiership	34	1	5	0	2	0	2 (Note: Appearances in UEFA Europa League)	0	43	1
Inverness Caledonian Thistle	Total		88	4	14	1	4	0	2	0	108	5
Dundee	2016–17	Scottish Premiership	23	0	1	0	4	0	—		28	0
Dundee	2017–18	Scottish Premiership	2	0	0	0	1	0	—		3	0
Dundee	Total		25	0	1	0	5	0	0	0	31	0
Accrington Stanley	2017–18	League Two	1	0	0	0	0	0	0	0	1	0
Accrington Stanley	2018–19	League One	1	0	0	0	0	0	0	0	1	0
Accrington Stanley	Total		2	0	0	0	0	0	0	0	2	0
AFC Fylde (loan)	2018–19	National League	6	0	0	0	0	0	1 (Note: Appearance in FA Trophy)	2	7	2
FC Halifax Town	2019–20	National League	25	0	0	0	0	0	5	1	30	1
FC Halifax Town	2020–21	National League	29	1	1	0	0	0	1	0	31	1
FC Halifax Town	Total		54	1	1	0	0	0	6	1	61	2
Career total			203	7	16	1	9	0	14	3	242	11

== Honours ==
Chester

- Conference North: 2012–13
- Cheshire Senior Cup: 2013

Inverness Caledonian Thistle

- Scottish Cup: 2014–15
