= Lewis Horner =

English footballer (born 1992)

Personal information
- Date of birth: 1 February 1992 (age 34)
- Place of birth: Newcastle upon Tyne, England
- Position: Defender

Senior career*
Years	Team	Apps	(Gls)
2011–2013	Hibernian	3	(0)
2011–2012	→ East Stirlingshire (loan)	25	(2)
2013	Newcastle Benfield	3	(2)
2013–2014	Blyth Spartans	34	(1)
2014–2017	Inverness Caledonian Thistle	28	(1)
2017–2020	Blyth Spartans	41	(0)
- * Club domestic league appearances and goals as of 09:09, 24 February 2021

Lewis Horner (born 1 February 1992) is a professional soccer player who is a free agent and plays as a defender. Horner has previously played for Hibernian, and a loan spell at East Stirlingshire. He has also played for Inverness Caledonian Thistle, Newcastle Benfield and he has had two spells at Blyth Spartans.

== Career ==
Horner attended Seaton Burn School and joined the football development programme at Tyne Met College. His progression at college went so well that he won a scholarship with Hibernian. Horner signed his first professional contract with Hibernian in January 2010 and made his first team debut as a substitute against Inverness Caledonian Thistle on 11 May 2011.

He was loaned to Scottish Third Division side East Stirlingshire in November 2011 and made his debut the following day against Berwick Rangers.

Horner was released by Hibernian at the end of his contract in 2013 and he signed for English non-league club Newcastle Benfield. He then moved to Blyth Spartans in September 2013, having played against them during pre-season. At Blyth, Horner earned a call up to the England C squad, from manager Paul Fairclough, for a fixture marking the Northern League's 125th anniversary.

After a successful trial in August 2014, Horner signed professional terms with Inverness Caledonian Thistle, reuniting him with manager John Hughes, who had previously been his manager at Hibernian. He made his debut for the club, coming on as a substitute for David Raven in the 82nd minutes, in a 0–0 draw against Dundee. Horner was an unused substitute as Inverness won the 2015 Scottish Cup Final.

In May 2017, the Scottish Football Association imposed a suspended eight-match ban on Horner for betting on football.

After Horner was released by Inverness in 2017, he signed again for Blyth Spartans. Despite an impressive few months back at Blyth, Horner fell out of favour with Manager Alun Armstrong and failed to reestablish himself in the team. On 4 May 2020, Horner left Blyth Spartans.

== Career statistics ==
As of match played 26 December 2017

Appearances and goals by club, season and competition
Club	Season	League			National Cup		League Cup		Other		Total	
Club	Season	Division	Apps	Goals	Apps	Goals	Apps	Goals	Apps	Goals	Apps	Goals
Hibernian	2010–11	Premier League	1	0	0	0	0	0	0	0	1	0
Hibernian	2011–12	Premier League	0	0	0	0	0	0	—		0	0
East Stirlingshire	2011–12	Third Division	25	2	1	0	0	0	0	0	26	2
Inverness Caledonian Thistle	2014–15	Premiership	2	0	0	0	0	0	—		2	0
Inverness Caledonian Thistle	2015–16	Premiership	16	1	2	0	0	0	0	0	18	1
Inverness Caledonian Thistle	2016–17	Premiership	10	0	0	0	1	0	—		11	0
Inverness Caledonian Thistle	Total		28	1	2	0	1	0	0	0	31	1
Blyth Spartans	2017–18	National League North	10	0	0	0	—		0	0	10	0
Career total			64	3	3	0	1	0	0	0	68	3
