= 2015–16 Inverness Caledonian Thistle F.C. season =

Scottish football club season

Inverness Caledonian Thistle
2015–16 season
- Chairman: Kenny Cameron
- Manager: John Hughes
- Stadium: Caledonian Stadium
- Premiership: Seventh Place
- League Cup: Quarter-final
- Scottish Cup: Quarter-final
- Europa League: Second qualifying round, lost to Astra Giurgiu
- Top goalscorer: League: Miles Storey (11); All: Miles Storey (13)
- Highest home attendance: 6,410 vs. Aberdeen
- Lowest home attendance: 1,231 vs. Stirling Albion
- Average home league attendance: 3,754
Home colours	Away colours

The 2015–16 season is the club's 3rd season in the Scottish Premiership and their 6th consecutive season in the top flight. Inverness Caledonian Thistle will also compete in the League Cup, the Scottish Cup, and the Europa League.

== Results and fixtures ==
Win Draw Loss Postponed

=== Pre season / Friendlies ===
27 June 2015 Friendly	Clachnacuddin	0–3	Inverness Caledonian Thistle	Inverness
13:00 BST		goals	Trialist 18'; Trialist 21'; Tansey 26'	Stadium: Grant Street Park

1 July 2015 Friendly	Brora Rangers	0–3	Inverness Caledonian Thistle	Brora
19:45 BST		goals	Trialist 16'; Trialist 55'; Doran 90'	Stadium: Dudgeon Park

3 July 2015 Friendly	Deveronvale	1–2	Inverness Caledonian Thistle	Banff
17:30 BST				Stadium: Princess Royal Park

7 July 2015 Friendly	Forres Mechanics	0–5	Inverness Caledonian Thistle	Forres
19:45 BST				Stadium: Mosset Park

11 July 2015 Friendly	Inverness Caledonian Thistle	1–1	St Mirren	Inverness
15:00 BST				Stadium: Caledonian Stadium

18 July 2015 Friendly	Nairn County	0–1	Inverness Caledonian Thistle	Nairn
15:00 BST			Foran 25'	Stadium: Station Park

=== Scottish Premiership ===
1 August 2015 Premiership	Inverness Caledonian Thistle	0–1	Motherwell	Caledonian Stadium
15:00		BBC Report	Fletcher 4'	Attendance: 3,307; Referee: Allan

8 August 2015 Premiership	St Johnstone	1–1	Inverness Caledonian Thistle	McDiarmid Park
15:00	Cummins 90'	BBC Report	Christie 9'	Attendance: 2,959; Referee: Collum

12 August 2015 Premiership	Inverness Caledonian Thistle	0–0	Partick Thistle	Caledonian Stadium
19:45		BBC Report		Attendance: 3,141; Referee: Finnie

15 August 2015 Premiership	Celtic	4–2	Inverness CT	Celtic Park
15:00	Lustig 8'; Griffiths 12'; Armstrong 55', 67'	BBC Report	Christie 70'; Lopez 77'	Attendance: 42,727; Referee: Craig Thomson

22 August 2015 Premiership	Inverness Caledonian Thistle	0–2	Hamilton Academical	Caledonian Stadium
15:00		BBC Report	Morris 18'; Longridge 90+1'	Attendance: 3,003; Referee: Anderson

29 August 2015 Premiership	Dundee	1–1	Inverness Caledonian Thistle	Dens Park
15:00	Hemmings 90+1'	BBC Report	Raven 60'; Mbuyi-Mutombo (red card) 90+3'	Attendance: 4,767; Referee: Dallas

11 September 2015 Premiership	Inverness Caledonian Thistle	2–0	Heart of Midlothian	Caledonian Stadium
19:45	Vincent 49'; Storey 89'	BBC Report	Oshaniwa (red card) 87'	Attendance: 4,160; Referee: McLean

19 September 2015 Premiership	Dundee United	1–1	Inverness Caledonian Thistle	Tannadice Park
15:00	McKay 7'	BBC Report	Meekings 56'	Attendance: 6,235; Referee: Clancy

26 September 2015 Premiership	Inverness Caledonian Thistle	2–1	Aberdeen	Caledonian Stadium
15:00	Storey 8'; Christie 29'; Christie (yellow card) 90' (yellow-red card)	BBC Report	Taylor 35'	Attendance: 6,410; Referee: Beaton

3 October 2015 Premiership	Ross County	1–2	Inverness Caledonian Thistle	Victoria Park
15:00	Boyce 90+1'	BBC Report	Storey 42'; Vincent 45'	Attendance: 5,473; Referee: Collum

17 October 2015 Premiership	Kilmarnock	2–0	Inverness Caledonian Thistle	Rugby Park
15:00	Kiltie 45+1'; Magennis 66'	Report	Storey (yellow card) 70'	Attendance: 3,234; Referee: Finnie

24 October 2015 Premiership	Inverness Caledonian Thistle	0–1	St Johnstone	Caledonian Stadium
15:00	Meekings (yellow card) 86'; Devine (yellow card) 90+4'	Report	Mackay (red card) 47'; Scobbie (yellow card) 66'; Craig 90+3' (pen.)	Attendance: 3,471; Referee: Robertson

31 October 2015 Premiership	Inverness Caledonian Thistle	1–1	Dundee	Caledonian Stadium
15:00	Raven (red card) 50'; Tansey 64' (pen.)	BBC Report	Loy 50' (pen.)	Attendance: 2,940; Referee: Colvin

7 November 2015 Premiership	Motherwell	1–3	Inverness Caledonian Thistle	Rugby Park
15:00	Moult 58'; McManus (yellow card) 90+5' (yellow-red card)	Report	Tansey 11' (pen.); Storey 45'; Vigurs 53'	Attendance: 3,569; Referee: Thomson

21 November 2015 Premiership	Partick Thistle	2–1	Inverness Caledonian Thistle	Firhill Stadium
15:00	Doolan 42'; Stevenson 90'	BBC Report	Storey 6'	Attendance: 2,864; Referee: Robertson

29 November 2015 Premiership	Inverness Caledonian Thistle	1–3	Celtic	Caledonian Stadium
	Storey 39'	BBC Report	McGregor 7'; Griffiths 59'; Devine 85' (o.g.)	Attendance: 5,976; Referee: Collum

12 December 2015 Premiership	Inverness Caledonian Thistle	2–1	Kilmarnock	Caledonian Stadium
15:00	Vigurs 14', 32'	BBC Report	Connolly 87'	Attendance: 2,775; Referee: Cook

19 December 2015 Premiership	Inverness Caledonian Thistle	2–2	Dundee United	Caledonian Stadium
15:00	Polworth 46'; Horner 90+2'	BBC Report	Rankin 26'; McKay 81'	Attendance: 2,981; Referee: Thomson

26 December 2015 Premiership	Aberdeen	2–2	Inverness Caledonian Thistle	Pittodrie Stadium
15:00	McGinn 73'; Rooney 90+1' (pen.)	BBC Report	Polworth 41'; Tansey 47' (pen.)	Attendance: 15,142; Referee: Collum

30 December 2015 Premiership	Hamilton Academical	3–4	Inverness Caledonian Thistle	New Douglas Park
	Morris 66'; Gordon 81'; Nadé 90'	BBC Report	Tansey 18', 88'; Polworth 51', 90+3'	Attendance: 1,555; Referee: Anderson

2 January 2016 Premiership	Inverness Caledonian Thistle	2–0	Ross County	Caledonian Stadium
15:00	Storey 26'; Tansey 45+2'	BBC Report		Attendance: 5,388; Referee: Beaton

16 January 2016 Premiership	Kilmarnock	2–1	Inverness Caledonian Thistle	Rugby Park
15:00	Kiltie 9'; Slater 51'	BBC Report	Draper 41'	Attendance: 2,937; Referee: Robertson

23 January 2016 Premiership	Inverness Caledonian Thistle	0–0	Partick Thistle	Caledonian Stadium
15:00		BBC Report		Attendance: 3,556; Referee: Aitken

15 February 2016 Premiership	Inverness Caledonian Thistle	3–1	Aberdeen	Caledonian Stadium
19:45	Vigurs 18'; Tansey 51'; Tremarco 65'	BBC Report	Rooney 7'	Attendance: 4,544; Referee: Collum

20 February 2016 Premiership	Celtic	3–0	Inverness Caledonian Thistle	Celtic Park
15:00	Mackay-Steven 54'; Griffiths 59', 90+3'	BBC Report		Attendance: 43,600; Referee: Robertson

27 February 2016 Premiership	Dundee	1–1	Inverness Caledonian Thistle	Dens Park
15:00	Hemmings 86'	BBC Report	Draper 13'	Attendance: 5,048; Referee: Andrew Dallas

1 March 2016 Premiership	Heart of Midlothian	2–0	Inverness Caledonian Thistle	Tynecastle Park
19:45	Walker 35'; Dauda 53'	BBC Report		Attendance: 15,767; Referee: Alan Muir

9 March 2016 Premiership	St Johnstone	1–0	Inverness Caledonian Thistle	McDiarmid Park
19:45	Kane 84'	BBC Report	Warren (red card) 68'	Attendance: 2,157; Referee: Don Robertson

12 March 2016 Premiership	Inverness Caledonian Thistle	0–1	Hamilton Academical	Caledonian Stadium
15:00		BBC Report	Morris 59'	Attendance: 3,510; Referee: Steven McLean

19 March 2016 Premiership	Ross County	0–3	Inverness Caledonian Thistle	Victoria Park
15:00		BBC Report	Polworth 32'; Draper 37'; Storey 48'	Attendance: 5,912; Referee: Bobby Madden

2 April 2016 Premiership	Inverness Caledonian Thistle	1–2	Motherwell	Caledonian Stadium
15:00	Vigurs 70' (pen.)	BBC Report	Ainsworth 62'; Johnson 90+4'	Attendance: 3,348; Referee: John Beaton

9 April 2016 Premiership	Dundee United	0–2	Inverness Caledonian Thistle	Tannadice Park
15:00		BBC Report	Storey 13'; Vigurs 50'	Attendance: 6,927; Referee: Craig Thomson

12 April 2016 Premiership	Inverness Caledonian Thistle	0–0	Heart of Midlothian	Caledonian Stadium
19:45		BBC Report		Attendance: 3,202; Referee: Don Robertson

24 April 2016 Premiership	Inverness Caledonian Thistle	3–1	Kilmarnock	Caledonian Stadium
12:00	Tansey 55' (pen.); Draper 73'; Williams 76'	BBC Report	Higginbotham 44'; MacDonald (red card) 53'	Attendance: 2,228; Referee: John Beaton

30 April 2016 Premiership	Partick Thistle	1–4	Inverness Caledonian Thistle	Firhill Stadium
15:00	Doolan 83'	BBC Report	Tremarco 14'; Storey 46'; Meekings 76'; Roberts 85'	Attendance: 2,609; Referee: Euan Anderson

6 May 2016 Premiership	Inverness Caledonian Thistle	2–3	Dundee United	Caledonian Stadium
19:45	Roberts 56'; Polworth 69'	BBC Report	Murray 6'; Meekings 45+1' (o.g.); Ofere 55'; Morris (red card) 78'	Attendance: 3,587; Referee: Don Robertson

11 May 2016 Premiership	Hamilton Academical	0–1	Inverness Caledonian Thistle	New Douglas Park
19:45	MacKinnon (red card) 75'	BBC Report	Devine 41'	Attendance: 1,516; Referee: Stephen Finnie

14 May 2016 Premiership	Inverness Caledonian Thistle	4–0	Dundee	Caledonian Stadium
15:00	Storey 61'; Devine 69'; Draper 71'; Foran 84' (pen.)	BBC Report		Attendance: 3,794; Referee: Barry Cook

=== UEFA Europa League ===
16 July 2015 Second qualifying round 1st leg	Inverness Caledonian Thistle	0–1	Astra Giurgiu (Romania)	Inverness, Scotland
19:45		BBC Report	Budescu 24'	Stadium: Caledonian Stadium, Inverness; Attendance: 5,534; Referee: Henry Johnsen

23 July 2015 Second qualifying round 2nd leg	(Romania) Astra Giurgiu	0–0 (1–0 agg.)	Inverness Caledonian Thistle	Giurgiu, Romania
19:00		BBC Report		Stadium: Stadionul Marin Anastasovici; Attendance: 3,067; Referee: Kuchin

=== Scottish League Cup ===
22 September 2015 League Cup Third Round	Livingston	0–2	Inverness Caledonian Thistle	Almondvale Stadium
19:45		BBC Report	Storey 12'; Devine 43'	Attendance: 644; Referee: Muir

27 October 2015 League Cup Quarter Final	Inverness Caledonian Thistle	1–2	Ross County	Caledonian Stadium
19:05	Tansey 78'	BBC Sport Report	Irvine 41'; Gardyne 48'	Attendance: 3,004; Referee: McLean

=== Scottish Cup ===
9 January 2016 Scottish Cup Fourth round	Stirling Albion	0–0	Inverness Caledonian Thistle	Forthbank Stadium
15:00		BBC Report		Attendance: 1,224; Referee: Northcroft

19 January 2016 Scottish Cup Fourth round replay	Inverness Caledonian Thistle	2–0	Stirling Albion	Caledonian Stadium
19:45	Mbuyi-Mutombo 28'; Vigurs 61'	BBC Report		Attendance: 1,231; Referee: Northcroft

6 February 2016 Scottish Cup Fifth round	Motherwell	1–2	Inverness Caledonian Thistle	Fir Park
	McDonald 67'	BBC Report	Storey 39'; Roberts 90'	Attendance: 3,907; Referee: McLean

6 March 2016 Scottish Cup QF	Inverness Caledonian Thistle	1–1	Hibernian	Easter Road
	Mbuyi-Mutombo 77'	BBC Report	Keatings 54'	Attendance: 9,884; Referee: Allan

16 March 2016 Scottish Cup QF replay	Inverness Caledonian Thistle	1–2	Hibernian	Caledonian Stadium
19:45	Vigurs 77'	BBC Report	Stokes 36', 41'	Attendance: 3,207; Referee: Finnie

== Squad statistics ==
=== Appearances ===
As of 14 May 2016

No.	Pos	Nat	Player	Total		Premiership		League Cup		Scottish Cup		Europa League	
No.	Pos	Nat	Player	Apps	Goals	Apps	Goals	Apps	Goals	Apps	Goals	Apps	Goals
2	DF	(England) ENG	David Raven	26	1	18+1	1	2+0	0	3+0	0	1+1	0
3	DF	(England) ENG	Carl Tremarco	37	2	28+4	2	2+0	0	3+0	0	0+0	0
4	MF	(Scotland) SCO	James Vincent	18	2	14+2	2	2+0	0	0+0	0	0+0	0
5	DF	(England) ENG	Gary Warren	32	0	23+2	0	0+0	0	5+0	0	2+0	0
6	DF	(England) ENG	Josh Meekings	26	2	21+0	2	2+0	0	1+0	0	2+0	0
7	FW	(Spain) ESP	Dani López	10	1	5+2	1	0+1	0	0+0	0	2+0	0
8	MF	(England) ENG	Ross Draper	40	5	31+1	5	1+0	0	5+0	0	1+1	0
9	MF	(Republic of Ireland) IRL	Richie Foran	11	1	0+7	1	0+0	0	1+1	0	0+2	0
10	MF	(Republic of Ireland) IRL	Aaron Doran	2	0	0+0	0	0+0	0	0+0	0	2+0	0
11	MF	(England) ENG	Jordan Roberts	13	3	8+1	2	0+0	0	1+2	1	0+1	0
14	DF	(Northern Ireland) NIR	Daniel Devine	46	3	37+0	2	2+0	1	5+0	0	2+0	0
15	MF	(England) ENG	Nat Wedderburn	19	0	8+7	0	0+0	0	2+0	0	2+0	0
16	MF	(England) ENG	Greg Tansey	45	9	37+0	8	2+0	1	4+0	0	2+0	0
17	MF	(England) ENG	Lewis Horner	18	1	11+5	1	0+0	0	1+1	0	0+0	0
18	MF	(England) ENG	Tobi Sho-Silva	5	0	0+5	0	0+0	0	0+0	0	0+0	0
18	FW	(England) ENG	Alex Fisher	3	0	0+1	0	0+0	0	0+2	0	0+0	0
19	MF	(England) ENG	Danny Williams	44	1	25+10	1	1+1	0	4+1	0	2+0	0
20	MF	(Scotland) SCO	Liam Polworth	43	6	33+3	6	1+1	0	3+2	0	0+0	0
22	MF	(Scotland) SCO	Ryan Christie	17	3	12+1	3	2+0	0	0+0	0	2+0	0
25	GK	(Wales) WAL	Owain Fôn Williams	47	0	38+0	0	2+0	0	5+0	0	2+0	0
27	MF	(Scotland) SCO	Iain Vigurs	36	8	24+6	6	1+0	0	5+0	2	0+0	0
28	FW	(Democratic Republic of the Congo) COD	Andréa Mbuyi-Mutombo	30	1	12+13	0	0+1	0	2+2	1	0+0	0
37	FW	(Scotland) SCO	Alisdair Sutherland	6	0	0+5	0	0+1	0	0+0	0	0+0	0
39	FW	(England) ENG	Miles Storey	37	13	29+1	11	2+0	1	4+1	1	0+0	0

=== Overall Goalscorers ===
Rank	Player	Goals
1st	(England) Miles Storey	13
2nd	(England) Greg Tansey	9
3rd	(Scotland) Iain Vigurs	8
4th	(Scotland) Liam Polworth	6
5th	(England) Ross Draper	5
6th	(Scotland) Ryan Christie (Northern Ireland) Danny Devine (England) Jordan Roberts	3
9th	(Democratic Republic of the Congo) Andréa Mbuyi-Mutombo (England) Josh Meekings (England) Carl Tremarco (Scotland) James Vincent	2
13th	(Republic of Ireland) Richie Foran (England) Lewis Horner (Spain) Dani López (England) David Raven (England) Danny Williams	1

=== Disciplinary record ===
As of 14 May 2016

Number	Nation	Position	Name	Premiership		League Cup		Scottish Cup		Europa League		Total	
Number	Nation	Position	Name	Yellow card	Red card	Yellow card	Red card	Yellow card	Red card	Yellow card	Red card	Yellow card	Red card
2	(England)	DF	David Raven	4	1	2	0	0	0	1	0	7	1
3	(England)	DF	Carl Tremarco	4	0	0	0	0	0	0	0	4	0
5	(England)	DF	Gary Warren	2	0	0	0	0	0	0	0	2	0
6	(England)	DF	Josh Meekings	1	0	0	0	0	0	1	0	2	0
7	(Spain)	FW	Dani López	0	0	0	0	0	0	1	0	1	0
8	(England)	DF	Ross Draper	6	0	0	0	1	0	0	0	7	0
11	(England)	DF	Jordan Roberts	0	0	0	0	1	0	1	0	2	0
14	(Northern Ireland)	DF	Daniel Devine	5	0	0	0	0	0	0	0	5	0
15	(England)	MF	Nat Wedderburn	1	0	0	0	0	0	0	0	1	0
16	(England)	MF	Greg Tansey	5	0	0	0	1	0	0	0	6	0
19	(England)	MF	Danny Williams	1	0	0	0	1	0	1	0	3	0
20	(Scotland)	MF	Liam Polworth	1	0	0	0	0	0	0	0	1	0
22	(Scotland)	MF	Ryan Christie	3	1	0	0	0	0	0	0	3	1
25	(Wales)	GK	Owain Fôn Williams	2	0	0	0	0	0	0	0	2	0
27	(Scotland)	MF	Iain Vigurs	7	0	1	0	1	0	0	0	9	0
28	(Democratic Republic of the Congo)	FW	Andréa Mbuyi-Mutombo	3	1	0	0	0	0	0	0	3	1
39	(England)	FW	Miles Storey	1	0	0	0	0	0	0	0	1	0
			TOTALS	47	3	3	0	5	0	5	0	60	3

== Team statistics ==
=== League table ===
Pos	Team	Pld	W	D	L	GF	GA	GD	Pts	Qualification or relegation (Note: Teams play each other three times (33 matches), before the league is split into two groups (the top six and the bottom six).)
5	Motherwell	38	15	5	18	47	63	−16	50	
6	Ross County	38	14	6	18	55	61	−6	48	
7	Inverness Caledonian Thistle	38	14	10	14	54	48	+6	52	
8	Dundee	38	11	15	12	53	57	−4	48	
9	Partick Thistle	38	12	10	16	41	50	−9	46	

Source: Scottish Premiership, Soccerway (first phase), Soccerway (second phase)
Rules for classification: 1) Points; 2) Goal difference; 3) Goals scored; 4) Play-off (only if deciding champion, UEFA competitions qualification and second stage group allocation).

=== Division summary ===
Round	1	2	3	4	5	6	7	8	9	10	11	12	13	14	15	16	17	18	19	20	21	22	23	24	25	26	27	28	29	30	31	32	33	34	35	36	37	38
Ground	H	A	H	A	H	A	H	A	H	A	A	H	H	A	A	H	H	H	A	A	H	A	H	H	A	A	A	A	H	A	H	A	H	H	A	H	A	H
Result	L	D	D	L	L	D	W	D	W	W	L	L	D	W	L	L	W	D	D	W	W	L	D	W	L	D	L	L	L	W	L	W	D	W	W	L	W	W
Position	10	10	9	11	11	10	7	9	8	8	8	9	9	8	8	8	9	9	8	6	6	7	6	6	7	7	7	9	9	9	9	9	9	9	7	8	7	7

Updated to match(es) played on 14 May 2016. Source:
A = Away; H = Home; W = Win; D = Draw; L = Loss

=== Management statistics ===
Last updated on 14 May 2016

Name	From	To	P	W	D	L	Win% (Note: Win% is the percentage of matches won rounded to two decimal places.)
John Hughes	16 July 2015	14 May 2016	47	17	13	17	36.17

== Transfers ==
Transfers In
Player	Age*	Pos	From	Fee	Date
(Canada) Calum Ferguson	20	ST	Academy	N/A	1 July 2015
(England) Nat Wedderburn	24	MF	(Scotland) Cowdenbeath	Free	1 July 2015
(England) Jordan Roberts	21	MF	(England) Aldershot Town	Free	7 July 2015
(Spain) Dani López	29	ST	(Spain) La Roda	Free	11 July 2015
(Wales) Owain Fôn Williams	28	GK	(England) Tranmere Rovers	Free	16 July 2015
(Democratic Republic of the Congo) Andréa Mbuyi-Mutombo	25	MF	(France) Fréjus Saint-Raphaël	Free	30 July 2015
(Scotland) Iain Vigurs	27	MF	(Scotland) Motherwell	Free	12 August 2015
(England) Alex Fisher	25	ST	(England) Torquay United	Free	9 January 2016
(England) Ryan Williams	24	MF	(England) Brentford	Free	1 February 2016
(England) Liam Hughes	23	MF	(England) Cambridge United	Free	1 February 2016

Transfers Out
Player	Age*	Pos	To	Fee	Date
(Wales) Marley Watkins	24	MF	(England) Barnsley	Free	1 July 2015
(Scotland) Graeme Shinnie	23	MF	(Scotland) Aberdeen	Free	1 July 2015
(Scotland) Nick Ross	23	MF	(Scotland) Dundee	Free	1 July 2015
(Estonia) Tarmo Kink	29	MF	(Estonia) Levadia Tallinn	Free	8 July 2015
(Scotland) Ryan Baptie	20	DF	(Scotland) Peterhead	Free	24 July 2015
(Nigeria) Edward Ofere	29	ST	(Turkey) Boluspor	Free	10 August 2015
(Scotland) Ryan Christie	20	MF	(Scotland) Celtic	£595,000	1 September 2015
(Spain) Dani López	30	ST	(Spain) Arenas Club	Free	13 January 2016

Loans In/Returns
Player	Age*	Pos	From	Duration	Date In	Date Out	Notes
(England) Tobi Sho-Silva	20	ST	(England) Charlton Athletic	Half Season	1 September 2015	4 January 2016	
(England) Miles Storey	21	ST	(England) Swindon Town	Season	1 September 2015	15 May 2016	
(Scotland) Ryan Christie	20	MF	(Scotland) Celtic	Season	2 September 2015	23 December 2015	Recalled

Loans Out/Returns
Player	Age*	Pos	To	Duration	Date Out	Date In	Notes
(Scotland) Ryan Christie	20	MF	(Scotland) Celtic	Return	23 December 2015	N/A	Recalled
(England) Tobi Sho-Silva	20	ST	(England) Charlton Athletic	Return	4 January 2016	N/A	
(England) Miles Storey	22	ST	(England) Swindon Town	Return	15 May 2016	N/A	

== See also ==
- List of Inverness Caledonian Thistle F.C. seasons
