= 2015 Scottish Cup final =

2015 Scottish Cup Final
- Official programme cover
- Event: 2014–15 Scottish Cup
Inverness Caledonian Thistle	Falkirk
2	1
- Date: 30 May 2015
- Venue: Hampden Park, Glasgow
- Referee: Willie Collum
- Attendance: 37,149

The 2015 Scottish Cup Final was the 130th final of the Scottish Cup, the most prestigious knockout football competition in Scotland. The match took place at Hampden Park on 30 May 2015 and was contested by Inverness Caledonian Thistle and Falkirk. Ten-man Inverness won the final 2–1 thanks to a late James Vincent goal.

Inverness subsequently entered the 2015–16 UEFA Europa League in the Second qualifying round. As Inverness also finished 3rd in the 2014–15 Scottish Premiership, this enabled St Johnstone to claim the final 2015–16 UEFA Europa League slot (in previous years this place would have gone to Falkirk as runners-up, as it had in 2009, but the rules were changed from 2015 onwards).

== Background ==
It was Inverness' first appearance in the final, their best performances being reaching the semi-final in 2003 and 2004, losing to Dundee and Dunfermline Athletic respectively. This was Falkirk's fifth Scottish Cup Final, having previously won twice (1913 against Raith Rovers and 1957 against Kilmarnock) and lost twice (1997 against Kilmarnock and 2009 against Rangers).

== Route to the final ==
=== Inverness Caledonian Thistle ===
Round	Opposition	Score
Fourth round	St Mirren	1–1
Fourth Round Replay	St Mirren	4–0
Fifth round	Partick Thistle	2–1
Quarter-final	Raith Rovers	1–0
Semi-final	Celtic	3–2 (a.e.t.)

Inverness, of the Scottish Premiership also entered the competition in the Fourth Round, coming from a goal down away at St Mirren to earn a replay which was comfortably won 4–0. In the Fifth Round, Caley eased their way past another Premiership side in Partick Thistle at Firhill, winning 2–1 to earn a berth in the quarter-finals. On this occasion they were given a home tie against Championship club Raith Rovers, who were dispatched by a single goal at the Caledonian Stadium.

This set up a semi-final with favourites Celtic at Hampden Park. Despite going into the tie as underdogs and falling behind to an early strike by Virgil van Dijk, Inverness stunned the Hoops by winning 3–2 after extra-time courtesy of a late David Raven goal to book their place in the final for the first time.

=== Falkirk ===
Round	Opposition	Score
Fourth round	Cowdenbeath	1–0
Fifth round	Brechin City	2–1
Quarter-final	Queen of the South	1–0
Semi-final	Hibernian	1–0

Falkirk, of the Scottish Championship, entered the competition in the Fourth Round. They began their campaign against Cowdenbeath at the Falkirk Stadium. Craig Sibbald scored the goal that sealed the Bairns' passage into the next round. They then took on Brechin City, winning 2–1 courtesy of goals from David McCracken and David Smith.

In the quarter-final Falkirk were drawn against Queen of the South. Craig Sibbald's goal sealed a 1–0 victory. In the semi-final at Hampden Park on 18 April, Falkirk faced Hibernian. A late header from Sibbald sent Falkirk to their first Scottish Cup final since 2009.

== Pre-match ==
The match was shown live on BBC Scotland and on Sky Sports.

== Match ==
=== Summary ===
Inverness took the lead in the 38th minute when Marley Watkins ran onto an Aaron Doran pass to round goalkeeper Jamie MacDonald and slot low into the net. Carl Tremarco was sent off for Inverness in the 75th minute for bringing down Blair Alston as the last man. Falkirk leveled the game with ten minutes to go when Peter Grant headed to the net at the back post after a free-kick by Blair Alston on the left of the penalty area. With four minutes to go Inverness got the winning goal when James Vincent finished from six yards out after the goalkeeper had parried out a low shot from Watkins.

=== Details ===
30 May 2015
15:00

Inverness Caledonian Thistle	2–1	Falkirk
Watkins 38'; Vincent 86'	Report	Grant 80'

Hampden Park, Glasgow
Attendance: 37,149
Referee: Willie Collum

Inverness CT	Falkirk

GK	1	(Scotland) Ryan Esson
DF	3	(Scotland) Graeme Shinnie (c)
DF	14	(Northern Ireland) Daniel Devine
DF	6	(England) Josh Meekings
DF	18	(England) Carl Tremarco	(red card) 75'
MF	16	(England) Greg Tansey
MF	8	(England) Ross Draper
MF	15	(England) Marley Watkins		(substituted off) 93'
MF	10	(Republic of Ireland) Aaron Doran		(substituted off) 78'
FW	22	(Scotland) Ryan Christie		(substituted off) 72'
FW	7	(Nigeria) Edward Ofere
Substitutes:
GK	31	(Scotland) Cameron Mackay
MF	4	(England) James Vincent		(substituted on) 72'
MF	11	(Scotland) Nick Ross		(substituted on) 93'
MF	17	(England) Lewis Horner
MF	19	(England) Danny Williams		(substituted on) 78'
MF	20	(Scotland) Liam Polworth
FW	25	(Estonia) Tarmo Kink
Manager:
(Scotland) John Hughes

GK	1	(Scotland) Jamie MacDonald
DF	2	(Scotland) Kieran Duffie
DF	5	(Scotland) David McCracken (c)
DF	14	(Scotland) Peter Grant
DF	19	(England) Luke Leahy
MF	8	(Scotland) Blair Alston
MF	6	(Wales) Will Vaulks
MF	7	(England) Tom Taiwo	(yellow card) 77'
MF	10	(Scotland) Craig Sibbald
MF	9	(Scotland) David Smith		(substituted off) 63'
FW	33	(Scotland) Rory Loy		(substituted off) 95'
Substitutes:
GK	12	(Scotland) Graham Bowman
DF	3	(Scotland) Aaron Muirhead
DF	15	(Scotland) Liam Dick
MF	20	(Scotland) Alex Cooper
MF	22	(Scotland) Ryan Blair
FW	28	(Scotland) Botti Bia-Bi		(substituted on) 63'
FW	36	(England) Taylor Morgan		(substituted on) 95'
Manager:
(Scotland) Peter Houston

Match rules

- 90 minutes
- 30 minutes of extra time if necessary
- Penalty shoot-out if scores still level
- Seven named substitutes
- Maximum of three substitutions
