= Yordi Teijsse =

Dutch footballer

Personal information
- Date of birth: 19 July 1992 (age 34)
- Place of birth: Amsterdam, Netherlands
- Height: 1.85 m (6 ft 1 in)
- Position: Forward

Team information
- Current team: VV Unicum

Youth career
- 2009–2010: FC Omniworld
- 2010–2012: Pancratius

Senior career*
Years	Team	Apps	(Gls)
2012–2014	Ter Leede		
2014–2016	Quick Boys	40	(37)
2016–2017	Dundee	9	(0)
2017	→ Wuppertaler SV (loan)	12	(2)
2017–2018	Quick Boys	29	(25)
2018–2021	AFC	63	(34)
2021–2022	Kozakken Boys	9	(2)
2022–	VV Unicum		
- * Club domestic league appearances and goals as of 1 July 2022

Yordi Teijsse (born 19 July 1992) is a Dutch professional footballer who plays as a forward for VV Unicum. He has previously played for Pancratius, Ter Leede, Quick Boys, Dundee, Wuppertaler SV, Quick Boys, AFC and Kozakken Boys.

While playing at Quick Boys, he earned the Player of the Season award from the club.

Teijsse signed for Scottish Premiership club Dundee in May 2016. He made some appearances early in the 2016–17 season, but fell out of favour after October. He moved on loan to German club Wuppertaler SV in January 2017.

His twin brother, Kenny Teijsse, is also a professional footballer.
