= Greg Tansey =

English footballer (born 1988)

Personal information
- Full name: Gregory James Tansey
- Date of birth: 21 November 1988 (age 38)
- Place of birth: Liverpool, England
- Height: 6 ft 1 in (1.85 m)
- Position: Midfielder

Senior career*
| Years | Team | Apps | (Gls) |
| 2006–2011 | Stockport County | 98 | (13) |
| 2008 | → Altrincham (loan) | 5 | (0) |
| 2011–2012 | Inverness Caledonian Thistle | 36 | (4) |
| 2012–2014 | Stevenage | 56 | (9) |
| 2014–2017 | Inverness Caledonian Thistle | 126 | (21) |
| 2017–2019 | Aberdeen | 9 | (0) |
| 2018 | → Ross County (loan) | 3 | (0) |
| 2019 | St Mirren | 6 | (0) |
| 2019 | Warrington Town | | |
| Total | | 396 | (47) |
- * Club domestic league appearances and goals

Gregory James Tansey (born 21 November 1988) is an English former professional footballer who played as a midfielder.

Tansey started his career at Stockport County, progressing through the youth system before making his first-team debut in 2006. He was loaned out to Conference National side Altrincham towards the latter stages of the 2007–08 season. Tansey spent six years at Stockport, becoming a permanent fixture in the side, as well as finishing as the club's top goalscorer during the 2010–11 campaign.
He left Stockport in June 2011, joining Scottish Premier League side Inverness Caledonian Thistle on a free transfer. After one season at Inverness, Tansey joined Football League One club Stevenage in May 2012, before returning to Inverness in 2014.

== Club career ==
=== Stockport County ===
Tansey progressed through the Centre of Excellence at Stockport County after joining them at age thirteen, and made his first-team debut in a 1–0 away win against Macclesfield Town in the Football League Trophy in October 2006. After making his debut, he said: "Making my debut at Stockport is obviously a good memory." He went on to make five appearances during the 2006–07 season, including his first league appearance, starting in a 2–1 home defeat to Milton Keynes Dons.
Ahead of the following season, Tansey, along with fellow Stockport player Ryan Crowther, were invited to travel to Milan with Liverpool's youth team to play in an arranged youth tournament. Liverpool agreed a deal with Stockport for both players, subject to satisfactory performances at the tournament. After the tournament, Liverpool wished to sign both players, although Tansey declined Liverpool's contract offer as he stated he wished to develop playing first-team football, as opposed to playing in Liverpool's youth side on a weekly basis. He was also strongly linked with a move to Charlton Athletic, but eventually signed a new two-year deal with Stockport in August 2007. He made 16 appearances for the club during the 2007–08 season, before joining Conference National side Altrincham on loan in March 2008. This deal ran until the end of the season. He made his Altrincham debut in a 1–1 draw against promoting-chasing Torquay United a day after joining the club, and went on to make five appearances before returning to Stockport.

Tansey struggled for first-team opportunities during the first half of the 2008–09 season, with Stockport now plying their trade in League One following their promotion the previous season. His first appearance of the season came as a 60th-minute substitute in a 5–0 win over Yeovil Town in the FA Cup in November 2008. He featured thirteen times during the season, scoring his first professional goal, a 25-yard free-kick, in a 2–1 home defeat against Walsall on 13 April 2009. The 2009–10 campaign turned out to be Tansey's first season of regular football, playing 37 times in all competitions, and scoring twice — including a "stunning 30-yard drive" in a 2–1 win over Leyton Orient. Financial difficulties at the club meant that Stockport were forced to sell a lot of players throughout the season, and the club were ultimately relegated back to League Two.

Despite the wholesale changes over the summer, Tansey remained at Stockport for the 2010–11 season, playing in the club's first match of the campaign, a 1–1 draw against Southend United. He scored his first goal of the season in an FA Cup tie away at Peterborough United in November 2010, hitting a late consolation strike from 30-yards as Stockport lost 4–1. Four days later, on 20 November, he scored a late 25-yard equaliser against Torquay United at Edgeley Park. This was followed by successive braces in December 2010; with Tansey scoring twice to salvage a point against Crewe Alexandra, and then netting two late goals as Stockport beat relegation rivals Barnet at Underhill. His impressive performances throughout the month meant that he won the League Two Player of the Month Award. He went on to score a further five times in the club's last nine league games, although he could not prevent the club's relegation to the Conference National. He finished the season as Stockport's top goalscorer with eleven goals in 41 games. He also scored Stockport's last goal in the Football League, a penalty in the tenth minute of added time in a 1–1 home draw with Cheltenham Town. During his six years at Stockport, Tansey made 112 appearances, scoring fourteen times.

=== Inverness Caledonian Thistle (first spell) ===
Despite being offered a new one-year deal at Stockport, Tansey left the club in favour of a move to SPL side Inverness Caledonian Thistle, officially signing on a free transfer in June 2011. He made his debut against Motherwell at Fir Park on 23 July 2011, playing the whole match in a 3–0 loss. Tansey opened his goalscoring account for Inverness two weeks later, on 6 August 2011, netting twice as Inverness drew 3–3 away at Dunfermline Athletic. In November 2011, Tansey was sent-off in a 2–0 home loss against Celtic. He was "controversially ordered off for leading with an arm in an aerial challenge", but contact was described as "minimal". The decision left Inverness manager Terry Butcher "furious" — "There's no way it's a red card. If anything it is assault by fingernail". Inverness opted to appeal against the sending off, and the red card was later rescinded with referee Stephen O'Reilly admitting he had "made a mistake". He went on to score in games against Dunfermline and Hibernian respectively, taking his goal tally for the season to four in league and cup competitions. Tansey scored a free-kick on the last day of the season, in a 2–0 home victory over Hibernian, in what was ultimately his last game for the club. During his one season at Inverness, he played 39 times, scoring five goals.

=== Stevenage ===
In May 2012, Tansey rejected a contract extension at Inverness, and opted to join League One side Stevenage, signing a three-year deal with the club. He made his debut for Stevenage in the club's 3–1 home victory over AFC Wimbledon in the League Cup on 14 August 2012, playing the first 70 minutes of the match. Tansey scored his first goal for the club in his ninth appearance, scoring with a 30-yard effort in a 3–1 win over Walsall at Broadhall Way on 18 September. He then went on to score in Stevenage's next two home games; scoring with a long-range strike in a 2–2 draw against Bury, before netting the only goal of the game courtesy of a curling free-kick in a 1–0 win over Scunthorpe United.

A month later, Tansey scored another long-range strike, this time in Stevenage's 4–1 loss to Preston North End, briefly tying the game in the first-half after the ball had dropped to him on the edge of the area. A goal in the club's 1–1 away draw with AFC Bournemouth on 20 November 2012 took his goal tally to five for the season. Just four days later, he scored with a "looping shot" in injury-time as Stevenage came from a goal down to draw 1–1 at home against Tranmere Rovers. Shortly after featuring in the club's defeat to Tranmere Rovers in March 2013, Tansey had a hernia operation, an injury that ruled him out of first-team action for a month. He returned as a late second-half substitute in Stevenage's last game of the season, a 2–0 loss to Milton Keynes Dons on 27 April 2013. Tansey made 40 appearances during his first season with the club, scoring six times.

Ahead of the 2013–14 campaign, Tansey scored in pre-season friendly match, a 2–0 victory against a Queens Park Rangers XI at Broadhall Way. He then opened the league season by scoring one goal and assisting another in Stevenage's 4–3 home loss to Oldham Athletic. Three weeks later on 31 August 2013, Tansey scored his second goal of the season – a free kick – in a 1–1 draw against Bradford City. Then, on 21 September 2013, Tansey scored his third goal of the season, converting a penalty, in a 3–1 loss against Carlisle United. In all games at Stevenage, Tansey made sixty-two appearances and scored nine times.

=== Inverness Caledonian Thistle (second spell) ===
On 17 January 2014, Tansey re-signed for Inverness Caledonian Thistle on an 18-month deal. Upon returning to Inverness, Tansey stated that he rejoined the club because of his motivation to help them play in Europe.

After a substitute appearance against Aberdeen, he made his starting debut against Hearts in the League Cup semi-final where he opened the scoring with a thunderous 25-yard-strike. In the quarter-final of the Scottish Cup, in a 5–0 loss to Dundee United, Tansey was sent-off after lunging at Paul Paton. After being suspended for the game against Hibernian, it was confirmed that Tansey was eligible to play in the final of the Scottish League Cup. In the final against Aberdeen, Tansey played the whole 90 minutes plus extra time before the game eventually reached a penalty shoot-out. Aberdeen won the match and the Cup after Tansey, along with Billy McKay, missed their penalties in the shoot-out. Tansey scored his first league goal, of his second spell at Inverness, in a 2–2 draw against St Mirren on 29 March 2014. He then scored his second goal in the last game of the season, a 2–0 win over St Johnstone. On his return to Inverness Caledonian Thistle, Tansey made twenty-one appearances and scored three times in all competitions.

At the start of the 2014–15 season, Tansey was a regular starter for the first team, operating in central midfield. He scored his first goal of the campaign during a 2–0 win over Motherwell. Two weeks later on 16 August 2014, Tansey scored his second goal of the season, in a 2–0 win over Kilmarnock. Two months later on 18 October 2014, Tansey's third goal of the season, in a 1–0 win over St Mirren. Tansey then scored from a penalty spot in the fourth round replay of Scottish Cup, in a 4–1 win over St Mirren on 2 December 2014. At the beginning of January 2015, Tansey signed an extension to his contract, keeping him at Inverness until the end of May 2017. Tansey scored three goals during February, starting the first one was against Partick Thistle in the fifth round of Scottish Cup, St Mirren and Dundee United. In the semi-final of Scottish Cup against Celtic, Tansey scored from the penalty spot to equalise after Craig Gordon was sent-off, as Inverness beat them 3–2 to put them through to their first ever Scottish Cup final. Tansey also played a vital to help the club qualify for the Europa League after finishing third when he provided assist for Edward Ofere to score the winning goal to guarantee European football for the first time. Tansey played as a centre-midfielder position in the Scottish Cup Final, as Inverness CT won 2–1 against Falkirk to win their first ever Scottish Cup Final. In his first full season at the club since his return, Tansey made 42 appearances and scored eight times in all competitions. Reflecting on winning the Scottish Cup, Tansey said: "The semi-final against Celtic was off the charts and then winning the Scottish Cup and playing in Europe."

In the 2015–16 season, Tansey played in both legs of the second qualifying round in the Europa League, as Inverness CT lose 1–0 on aggregate against Astra Giurgiu. At the start of the season, Tansey suffered an injury and had to be substituted during a 2–0 loss against Hamilton Academical on 22 August 2015. Following an assessment on his injury, he managed to recover and returned to the starting line-up, in a 1–1 draw against Dundee on 29 August 2015. Since the start of the season, Tansey continued to regain his first team place, playing in the midfield position. On 27 October 2015, he scored his first goal of the season, in a 2–1 win over local rivals' Ross County. This was followed up by scoring in the next two matches against Dundee and Motherwell. Between 26 December 2015 and 2 January 2016, Tansey went on a scoring spree when he scored against Aberdeen, twice against Hamilton Academical and Ross County. He later two more goals later in the 2015–16 season. Despite missing two matches during the 2015–16 season, Tansey went on to make forty–five appearances and scoring nine times in all competitions.

At the start of the 2016–17 season, Tansey continued to regain his first team place, playing in the midfield position. Over the season, the club began to negotiate with Tansey over a new contract. Amid to the contract negotiation, he scored his first goal of the season, in a 3–1 win over Dundee on 24 September 2016. However, Tansey was sent–off for a second bookable offence, in a 3–0 against Celtic on 5 November 2016 and served a one match ban as a result. After returning to the starting line-up from a one match ban, he scored his second goal of the season, a month later on 28 December 2016, in a 2–1 loss against Motherwell. Shortly after, he rejected suggestions from Inverness CT that he's a "money-grabber", having yet to sign a contract since being offered by the club. Tansey later scored five more goals later in the season, including vital wins against Rangers, Hamilton Academical and Motherwell. Throughout the 2016–17 season, the club have found themselves fighting in the relegation zone in the league. Eventually, the club were relegated to the Scottish Championship on the final day of the season. At the end of the 2016–17 season, he went on to make forty–four appearances and scoring seven times in all competitions.

=== Aberdeen ===
On 30 March 2017, Tansey signed a pre-contract agreement with Aberdeen, with a 3-year deal to start on 9 June 2017. The club previously tried to sign him the previous transfer window last year but he rejected the move to stay at Inverness CT.

Tansey made his Aberdeen debut on 13 July 2017 in a UEFA Europa League second qualifying round first leg at home to NK Široki Brijeg, starting in a 1–1 draw; and helped the side win 2–0 in the second leg. He then set up two goals in two matches between 12 August 2017 and 19 August 2017 against Ross County and Dundee. However, Tansey struggled to hold down a regular place in the Aberdeen team, as well as, competitions in the midfield. By the time he departed the club, Tansey went on to make fourteen appearances for the side.

Tansey was loaned to Ross County for the second part of the 2017–18 season. After spending month recovering from a groin injury, he made his Ross County debut, coming on as a substitute for Mattias Käit in the 59th minute, in a 1–1 draw against Hearts on 17 February 2018. However, his return was short–lived when Tansey suffered a hernia/groin problem and was sidelined for a month after undergoing an operation. Tansey returned to the first team a month later on 28 April 2018, starting a match before being substituted in the 75th minute, in a 2–0 loss against Hamilton Academical. However, he suffered a groin injury once again and was sidelined for the rest of the season. Following this, the club were relegated to the Scottish Championship on the final day of the season.

Ahead of the 2018–19 season, Tansey was told by the club's management that he has no future at Aberdeen and expected to leave the club, which never happened over the summer. Tansey continued to recover from a groin injury for the rest of 2018 and he was released by Aberdeen on 8 January 2019, having made no appearances for the side this season.

=== St Mirren ===
After being released by Aberdeen, Tansey joined St Mirren later the same day on an 18-month deal.

He made his debut a few weeks later in a 3–2 Scottish Cup win at home to Alloa Athletic. Tansey quickly became a first team regular for the side, playing in the midfield position since joining the club. However, during a 1–1 draw against Hearts on 23 February 2019, Tansey was booked after making a challenge on Clévid Dikamona and served a two match suspension, in what turned out to be his last appearance of his career. After serving two match ban, he, however, suffered a groin injury that saw him out of action for the rest of the 2018–19 season. In August 2019, Tansey left the club by mutual consent following struggles with injury, having made only eight appearances.

Following his release, Tansey returned to England to join Warrington Town in September 2019, briefly joining former Inverness team-mate, David Raven. However, he spent two weeks training with the club and announced his retirement due to injury in October 2019.

== Personal life ==
Tansey's grandfather, Jimmy, was also a professional footballer, and played for Everton and Crewe Alexandra. Tansey was born and raised in Huyton, just outside of Liverpool, England.

Following his retirement, he revealed that he's getting a university degree, as well as, taking interests in property investment and starting his coaching badge.

== Career statistics ==
As of match played 23 February 2019

Appearances and goals by club, season and competition
| Club | Season | League | | | National Cup | | League Cup | | Other | | Total | |
| Club | Season | Division | Apps | Goals | Apps | Goals | Apps | Goals | Apps | Goals | Apps | Goals |
|---|---|---|---|---|---|---|---|---|---|---|---|---|
| Stockport County | 2006–07 | League Two | 3 | 0 | 0 | 0 | 0 | 0 | 2 (Note: Appearance(s) in Football League Trophy) | 0 | 5 | 0 |
| Stockport County | 2007–08 | League Two | 13 | 0 | 2 | 0 | 0 | 0 | 1 | 0 | 16 | 0 |
| Stockport County | 2008–09 | League One | 12 | 1 | 1 | 0 | 0 | 0 | 0 | 0 | 13 | 1 |
| Stockport County | 2009–10 | League One | 32 | 2 | 2 | 0 | 1 | 0 | 2 | 0 | 37 | 2 |
| Stockport County | 2010–11 | League Two | 38 | 10 | 1 | 1 | 1 | 0 | 1 | 0 | 41 | 11 |
| Stockport County | Total | | 98 | 13 | 6 | 1 | 2 | 0 | 6 | 0 | 112 | 14 |
| Altrincham (loan) | 2007–08 | Conference Premier | 5 | 0 | 0 | 0 | 0 | 0 | 0 | 0 | 5 | 0 |
| Inverness Caledonian Thistle | 2011–12 | Scottish Premier League | 36 | 4 | 3 | 1 | 0 | 0 | 0 | 0 | 39 | 5 |
| Stevenage | 2012–13 | League One | 37 | 6 | 0 | 0 | 2 | 0 | 1 | 0 | 40 | 6 |
| Stevenage | 2013–14 | League One | 19 | 3 | 1 | 0 | 2 | 0 | 0 | 0 | 22 | 3 |
| Stevenage | Total | | 56 | 9 | 1 | 0 | 4 | 0 | 1 | 0 | 62 | 9 |
| Inverness Caledonian Thistle | 2013–14 | Scottish Premiership | 16 | 2 | 3 | 0 | 2 | 1 | 0 | 0 | 21 | 3 |
| Inverness Caledonian Thistle | 2014–15 | Scottish Premiership | 36 | 4 | 5 | 3 | 1 | 0 | 0 | 0 | 42 | 7 |
| Inverness Caledonian Thistle | 2015–16 | Scottish Premiership | 37 | 8 | 4 | 0 | 2 | 1 | 2 (Note: Appearances in UEFA Europa League) | 0 | 45 | 9 |
| Inverness Caledonian Thistle | 2016–17 | Scottish Premiership | 37 | 7 | 2 | 0 | 5 | 0 | 0 | 0 | 44 | 7 |
| Inverness Caledonian Thistle | Total | | 126 | 21 | 14 | 3 | 10 | 2 | 2 | 0 | 152 | 26 |
| Aberdeen | 2017–18 | Scottish Premiership | 9 | 0 | 0 | 0 | 2 | 0 | 3 | 0 | 14 | 0 |
| Aberdeen | 2018–19 | Scottish Premiership | 0 | 0 | 0 | 0 | 0 | 0 | 0 | 0 | 0 | 0 |
| Ross County (loan) | 2017–18 | Scottish Premiership | 3 | 0 | 0 | 0 | 0 | 0 | 0 | 0 | 3 | 0 |
| St Mirren | 2018–19 | Scottish Premiership | 6 | 0 | 2 | 0 | 0 | 0 | 0 | 0 | 8 | 0 |
| Career total | | | 339 | 47 | 26 | 5 | 18 | 2 | 12 | 0 | 395 | 46 |

== Honours ==
Stockport County

- Football League Two play-offs: 2008

Inverness Caledonian Thistle

- Scottish Cup: 2014–15

Individual

- Football League Two Player of the Month: December 2010
