= 2019–20 Ross County F.C. season =

Ross County
2019–20 season
- Chairman: Roy MacGregor
- Manager: Steven Ferguson and Stuart Kettlewell
- Ground: Victoria Park; Dingwall, Ross-shire (Capacity: 6,541)
- Scottish Premiership: 10th
- Scottish League Cup: Second Round
- Scottish Cup: Fourth Round
- Top goalscorer: League: Ross Stewart, Billy McKay (7); All: Ross Stewart, Billy McKay (11)
- Highest home attendance: 6,575 vs Rangers (League)
- Lowest home attendance: 3,301 vs Livingston (League)
Home colours	Away colours

The 2019–20 season was the club's 1st season back in the Scottish Premiership, the top flight of Scottish football, after being promoted as Champions from the Scottish Championship. Ross County also competed in the League Cup and the Scottish Cup.

== Results & fixtures ==
Win Draw Loss Postponed

=== Pre-season ===
29 June 2019 Friendly	Nairn County	0–3	Ross County	Station Park, Nairn
15:00			Stewart; Mckay; MacBeath

29 June 2019 Friendly	Forres Mechanics	0–11	Ross County	Mosset Park, Forres
15:00			Watson; McManus; Paton; Murray; Graham; Armstrong

5 July 2019 Friendly	Groningen	2–0	Ross County	Assen, Netherlands
19:00	Postema 12'; Sierhuis 70'

7 July 2019 Friendly	GFA Deventer City	1–3	Ross County	Doorwerth, Netherlands
19:00	Goal		Watson; Graham; Stewart

27 July 2019 Friendly	Ross County	2–0	Carlisle United	Victoria Park
15:00	Power 52'; Vigurs 73'			Attendance: 735; Referee: Steven McLean

=== Scottish Premiership ===
3 August 2019 1	Ross County	3–0	Hamilton Academical	Dingwall
15:00	Chalmers 30'; Mckay 36'; Stewart 57'	Report	McKenna (yellow card) 1'; MacKinnon (yellow card) 51'; Oakley (yellow card) 71'	Stadium: Victoria Park; Attendance: 4,071; Referee: Alan Newlands

10 August 2019 2	Heart of Midlothian	0–0	Ross County	Edinburgh
15:00		Report	Morris (yellow card) 45'; Kelly (yellow card) 73'; Spittal (yellow card) 87'	Stadium: Tynecastle; Attendance: 15,652; Referee: Alan Muir

24 August 2019 3	Ross County	1–4	Livingston	Dingwall
15:00	Stewart 44'	Report	Guthrie 3'; Lawless 14'; Dykes 26'; Stobbs 52'	Stadium: Global Energy Stadium; Attendance: 4,237; Referee: John Beaton

31 August 2019 4	Aberdeen	3–0	Ross County	Aberdeen
15:00	Leigh 34'; Cosgrove 37' (pen.); Hedges 50'; Ojo (yellow card) 51'; Considine (yellow card) 73'	Report	Stewart (yellow card) 27'	Stadium: Pittodrie Stadium; Attendance: 13,006; Referee: Nick Walsh

14 September 2019 5	Ross County	2–1	St Mirren	Dingwall
15:00	Stewart 62'; Fraser 90+2'	Report	Andreu 72'	Stadium: Victoria Park; Attendance: 3,637; Referee: Colin Steven

21 September 2019 6	Motherwell	1–2	Ross County	Motherwell
15:00	Gallagher (yellow card) 58'; Campbell 61'; Carroll (yellow card) 78' (yellow-red card) 80'	Report	Graham 75'; Gardyne (yellow card) 84'; Stewart 88'; Spittal (yellow card) 90+4'	Stadium: Fir Park; Attendance: 4,620; Referee: Alan Muir

28 September 2019 7	Kilmarnock	0–0	Ross County	Kilmarnock
15:00		Report	Gardyne (yellow card) 40'; Fraser (yellow card) 82'	Stadium: Fir Park; Attendance: 4,906; Referee: Alan Newlands

5 October 2019 8	Ross County	2–2	St Johnstone	Dingwall
15:00	Chalmers 10'; Spittal 68'	Report	May 24'; Kennedy 51'	Stadium: Victoria Park; Attendance: 4,124; Referee: Euan Anderson

19 October 2019 9	Celtic	6–0	Ross County	Glasgow
	Elyounoussi 4', 72'; Édouard 46'; McGregor 49'; Fontaine 50' (o.g.); Forrest 55'	Report		Stadium: Celtic Park; Attendance: 58,560; Referee: Don Robertson

26 October 2019 10	Hibernian	2–2	Ross County	Edinburgh
	Horgan 50'; Allan 56'	Report	Graham 72'; Chalmers 90'	Stadium: Easter Road; Attendance: 15,452; Referee: Steven Maclean

30 October 2019 11	Ross County	0−4	Rangers	Dingwall
19:45	Stewart (yellow card) 59'	Report	Morelos 20', 71'; Jack 29', 37'	Stadium: Global Energy Stadium; Attendance: 6,575; Referee: Bobby Madden

2 November 2019 12	Hamilton Academical	2–2	Ross County	Hamilton
15:00	Smith 52'; Oakley 64'; Martin (red card) 90+3'	Report	McKay 1'; Graham 88'	Stadium: New Douglas Park; Attendance: 1,268; Referee: Colin Steven

9 November 2019 13	Ross County	1–3	Aberdeen	Aberdeen
15:00 GMT	Mullin 5' (pen.); Morris (yellow card) 22'; Fontaine (yellow card) 84'	Report	McGinn 10'; Hedges 52'; Ferguson (yellow card) 64'; Considine 70'	Stadium: Global Energy Stadium; Attendance: 6,510; Referee: Alan Newlands

23 November 2019 14	St Mirren	2–1	Ross County	Paisley
15:00	McLoughlin 43'; Foley 88'		Graham 24'	Stadium: St Mirren Park; Attendance: 4,708; Referee: Euan Anderson

1 December 2019 15	Ross County	1–4	Celtic	Dingwall
	Stewart 24'	Report	Christie 11', 38'; Rogic 67'; Johnston 73'	Stadium: Victoria Park; Attendance: 6,512; Referee: Nick Walsh

4 December 2019 16	Ross County	2–1	Hibernian	Dingwall
	Stewart 65', 75'	Report	Doidge 34'	Stadium: Victoria Park; Attendance: 4,196; Referee: David Munro

14 December 2019 17	Ross County	1–0	Kilmarnock	Dingwall
	Erwin 90+2'	Report		Stadium: Victoria Park; Attendance: 3,688; Referee: Alan Muir

21 December 2019 18	Livingston	4 − 0	Ross County	Almondvale Stadium
15:00	Lamie 31'; Dykes 41', 50', 73'; Sibbald (yellow card) 60'	Report		Attendance: 1,201; Referee: Colin Steven

26 December 2019 19	Ross County	1 – 2	Motherwell	Dingwall
15:00 GMT (UTC)	Spittal 24'; Spence (yellow card) 48' (red card) 62'; Foster (yellow card) 71'; Fontaine (yellow card) 90+4'; Graham (yellow card) 90+5'	Report	Gallagher (yellow card) 49' (goal) 90+2'; Maciver 81'; Hartley (yellow card) 90+4'; Polworth (yellow card) 90+5'	Stadium: Victoria Park; Attendance: 4,181; Referee: Greg Aitken

29 December 2019 20	St Johnstone	1 − 1	Ross County	McDiarmid Park
15:00	Hendry 84'	Report	Vigurs 72'; Graham (yellow card) 68' (yellow-red card) 90+3'	Attendance: 2,658; Referee: Bobby Madden

22 January 2020 21	Ross County	0 – 0	Heart of Midlothian	Dingwall
19:45	Vigurs (yellow card) 81'	Report	Souttar (yellow card) 90+2'	Stadium: Victoria Park; Attendance: 4,301; Referee: Gavin Duncan

25 January 2020 22	Celtic	3 – 0	Ross County	Glasgow
	McGregor 37' (pen.); Bauer (yellow card) 51'; Édouard 65', 68'	Report		Stadium: Celtic Park; Attendance: 58,785; Referee: Kevin Clancy

29 January 2020 23	Rangers	2−0	Ross County	Glasgow
19:45	Defoe 41'; Arfield 47'; Goldson (yellow card) 52'; Polster (yellow card) 67'	Report	Mullin (yellow card) 45'; Spence (yellow card) 74'; Kelly (yellow card) 76'; Fraser (yellow card) 86'	Stadium: Ibrox Stadium; Attendance: 47,583; Referee: Don Robertson

1 February 2020 24	Kilmarnock	3–1	Ross County	Kilmarnock
15:00	Brophy 54', 57'; Kabamba 82'	Report	Vigurs 25'	Stadium: Fir Park; Attendance: 4,733; Referee: Willie Collum

5 February 2020 25	Ross County	2–0	Livingston	Dingwall
19:45	McKay 2', 59'	Report		Stadium: Global Energy Stadium; Attendance: 3,301; Referee: Nick Walsh

12 February 2020 26	Hibernian	3–0	Ross County	Edinburgh
19:45	McNulty 7'; Doidge 41'; Jackson 84'	Report		Stadium: Easter Road; Attendance: 14,486; Referee: Steven McLean

15 February 2020 27	Ross County	1–1	St Johnstone	Dingwall
15:00	McKay 90+4'	Report	May 33'	Stadium: Victoria Park; Attendance: 3,569; Referee: Colin Dteven

22 February 2020 28	Aberdeen	1–2	Ross County	Aberdeen
15:00	Main 28'; Campbell (yellow card) 18' (yellow-red card) 32'	Report	McKay 43', 88'	Stadium: Pittodrie Stadium; Attendance: 14,860; Referee: Gavin Duncan

4 March 2020 29	Motherwell	4 – 1	Ross County	Motherwell
19:45	O'Hara 17'; Aarons (yellow card) 20'; Campbell 25', 75'; Tait (yellow card) 65'; Watt 90+3'	Report	Fontaine 3'; Morris (yellow card) 16'; Vigurs (yellow card) 64'; Stewart (yellow card) 80'	Stadium: Fir Park; Attendance: 3,191; Referee: Alan Muir

8 March 2020 30	Ross County	0−1	Rangers	Dingwall
12:00	Fontaine (yellow card) 12'; Stewart (yellow card) 56'; Spittal (yellow card) 90+1'; Morris (yellow card) 90+5'	Report	Kent 77'	Stadium: Global Energy Stadium; Attendance: 6,400; Referee: Andrew Dallas

=== Scottish League Cup ===
13 July 2019	Ross County	4–1	Montrose	Dingwall
15:00	Mullin 7'; Stewart 13', 46'; Mckay 85'		Lyons (yellow card) 18'; Allan 51'	Stadium: Victoria Park; Attendance: 1,159; Referee: Chris Fordyce

16 July 2019	Brechin City	0–4	Ross County	Brechin
19:45			Stewart 33', 44'; Mckay 49'; Spittal 75'	Stadium: Glebe Park; Attendance: 272; Referee: Alan Newlands

21 July 2019	St Johnstone	1–2	Ross County	Perth
15:00	Tanser 8' (pen.); Craig (yellow card) 73'		Mckay 30', 45+1'; Vigurs (yellow card) 63'	Stadium: McDiarmid Park; Attendance: 1,648; Referee: Bobby Madden

24 July 2019	Ross County	2–0	Forfar Athletic	Dingwall
19:45	Graham 15', 76'		Bain (yellow card) 66'	Stadium: Victoria Park; Attendance: 1,002; Referee: Willie Collum

17 August 2019	Partick Thistle	3–2 (a.e.t.)	Ross County	Glasgow
15:00	Miller 80'; Penrice 96'; Saunders 114'		Spittal 60'; Paton 105'	Stadium: Firhill Stadium; Attendance: 2,053; Referee: Steven McLean

=== Scottish Cup ===
18 January 2020	Ayr United	1–0	Ross County	Ayr
15:00	Bell 37'	Report		Stadium: Somerset Park; Attendance: 1,538; Referee: Andrew Dallas

== Squad statistics ==
=== Appearances ===
As of 8 March 2020

No.	Pos	Nat	Player	Total		Premiership		Scottish Cup		League Cup	
No.	Pos	Nat	Player	Apps	Goals	Apps	Goals	Apps	Goals	Apps	Goals
1	GK	(Scotland) SCO	Ross Laidlaw	22	0	17	0	0	0	5	0
2	DF	(Scotland) SCO	Marcus Fraser(c)	31	1	25+1	1	0	0	4+1	0
3	DF	(Scotland) SCO	Sean Kelly	23	0	18	0	1	0	4	0
4	DF	(England) ENG	Liam Fontaine	27	1	22	1	1	0	4	0
5	DF	(Northern Ireland) NIR	Callum Morris	19	0	17	0	0	0	2	0
6	MF	(England) ENG	Ross Draper	12	0	8+3	0	0	0	1	0
7	FW	(Scotland) SCO	Michael Gardyne	17	0	13+1	0	0	0	2+1	0
8	FW	(Scotland) SCO	Lee Erwin	19	1	11+6	1	1	0	0+1	0
9	FW	(Northern Ireland) NIR	Billy Mckay	33	11	22+5	7	0+1	0	4+1	4
11	MF	(Scotland) SCO	Iain Vigurs	22	2	16	2	1	0	3+2	0
12	DF	(England) ENG	Tom Grivosti	8	0	5+1	0	0	0	2	0
14	MF	(Scotland) SCO	Josh Mullin	32	2	21+6	1	1	0	3+1	1
15	DF	(Scotland) SCO	Keith Watson	20	0	14+3	0	0	0	2+1	0
16	MF	(Scotland) SCO	Lewis Spence	15	0	10+5	0	0	0	0	0
18	DF	(Scotland) SCO	Richard Foster	21	0	19+1	0	1	0	0	0
19	FW	(Scotland) SCO	Oli Shaw	7	0	2+5	0	0	0	0	0
20	MF	(Scotland) SCO	Blair Spittal	26	4	10+10	2	1	0	4+1	2
21	GK	(England) ENG	Nathan Baxter	14	0	13	0	1	0	0	0
22	MF	(England) ENG	Jordan Tillson	8	0	5+2	0	1	0	0	0
23	MF	(Scotland) SCO	Joe Chalmers	19	3	6+8	3	0	0	4+1	0
24	MF	(Canada) CAN	Harry Paton	23	1	11+8	0	1	0	2+1	1
25	DF	(Scotland) SCO	Coll Donaldson	8	0	7	0	1	0	0	0
26	MF	(Scotland) SCO	Don Cowie	9	0	7+2	0	0	0	0	0
27	FW	(Scotland) SCO	Ross Stewart	26	11	19+2	7	0	0	4+1	4
38	DF	(Scotland) SCO	Ruari Fraser	0	0	0	0	0	0	0	0
41	GK	(England) ENG	Tommy Dixon-Hodge	0	0	0	0	0	0	0	0
43	DF	(Scotland) SCO	Josh Reid	0	0	0	0	0	0	0	0
44	FW	(Scotland) SCO	Matthew Wright	0	0	0	0	0	0	0	0
Players who left the club during the season
8	MF	(Scotland) SCO	Jamie Lindsay	1	0	0	0	0	0	1	0
17	MF	(Scotland) SCO	Ewan Henderson	10	0	6+3	0	0+1	0	0	0
19	FW	(Scotland) SCO	Brian Graham	23	6	5+13	4	0+1	0	2+2	2
22	MF	(Republic of Ireland) IRL	Simon Power	4	0	0+1	0	0	0	1+2	0
25	GK	(Scotland) SCO	Jack Ruddy	0	0	0	0	0	0	0	0
36	MF	(Scotland) SCO	Mark Gallagher	0	0	0	0	0	0	0	0

=== Goalscorers ===
Rank	Pos.	Player	Premiership	Scottish Cup	League Cup	Total
1	ST	(Scotland) Ross Stewart	7	0	4	11
1	ST	(Northern Ireland) Billy Mckay	7	0	4	11
3	ST	(Scotland) Brian Graham	4	0	2	6
4	MF	(Scotland) Blair Spittal	2	0	2	4
5	MF	(Scotland) Joe Chalmers	3	0	0	3
6	MF	(Scotland) Iain Vigurs	2	0	0	2
6	MF	(Scotland) Josh Mullin	1	0	1	2
7	DF	(England) Liam Fontaine	1	0	0	1
7	DF	(Scotland) Marcus Fraser	1	0	0	1
7	FW	(Scotland) Lee Erwin	1	0	0	1
7	MF	(Canada) Harry Paton	0	0	1	1
Totals			29	0	14	43
Last updated: 4 March 2020

== Team statistics ==
=== League table ===
Pos	Team	Pld	W	D	L	GF	GA	GD	Pts	PPG	Qualification or relegation (Note: All play-off matches were cancelled, as clubs voted to curtail the season due to the COVID-19 pandemic.)
8	Kilmarnock	30	9	6	15	31	41	−10	33	1.10	
9	St Mirren	30	7	8	15	24	41	−17	29	0.97	
10	Ross County	30	7	8	15	29	60	−31	29	0.97	
11	Hamilton Academical	30	6	9	15	30	50	−20	27	0.90	
12	Heart of Midlothian (R)	30	4	11	15	31	52	−21	23	0.77	Relegation to the Championship

Source: BBC SPFL
Rules for classification: 1) Points per game; 2) Goal difference; 3) Goals scored; 4) Head-to-head points; 5) Head-to-Head goal difference; 6) Play-off (only if deciding champion, UEFA competitions qualification, second stage group allocation or relegation).
(R) Relegated

=== League Cup table ===
Pos	Team	Pld	W	PW	PL	L	GF	GA	GD	Pts	Qualification	ROS	FOR	MON	STJ	BRE
1	Ross County	4	4	0	0	0	12	2	+10	12	Qualification for the Second Round	—	2–0	4–1	—	—
2	Forfar Athletic	4	3	0	0	1	9	4	+5	9	Qualification for the Second Round	—	—	—	2–1	3–0
3	Montrose	4	1	1	0	2	4	9	−5	5		—	1–4	—	1–0	—
4	St Johnstone	4	1	0	0	3	6	5	+1	3		1–2	—	—	—	4–0
5	Brechin City	4	0	0	1	3	1	12	−11	1		0–4	—	1–1p	—	—

Rules for classification: 1) goal difference, 2) goals scored, 3) away goals scored, 4) matches won, 5) away matches won, 6) drawing of lots.

== Transfers ==
=== In ===
Date	Player	From	Fee
1 June 2019	(Scotland) Joe Chalmers	(Scotland) Inverness Caledonian Thistle	Free
1 June 2019	(Scotland) Ross Laidlaw	(Scotland) Hibernian	Free
4 June 2019	(Scotland) Blair Spittal	(Scotland) Partick Thistle	Free
19 June 2019	(England) Nathan Baxter	(England) Chelsea	Loan
4 July 2019	(Republic of Ireland) Simon Power	(England) Norwich City	Loan
23 July 2019	(Scotland) Jack Ruddy	(England) Wolverhampton Wanderers	Free
23 July 2019	(Scotland) Lee Erwin	(Iran) Tractor	Free
2 September 2019	(Scotland) Ewan Henderson	(Scotland) Celtic	Loan
29 August 2019	(Scotland) Richard Foster	(Scotland) St Johnstone	Free
15 January 2020	(England) Jordan Tillson	(England) Exeter City	Free
15 January 2020	(Scotland) Coll Donaldson	(Scotland) Inverness Caledonian Thistle	Undisclosed
22 January 2020	(Scotland) Oli Shaw	(Scotland) Hibernian	Undisclosed

=== Out ===
Date	Player	To	Fee
24 May 2019	(Scotland) Greg Morrison	(Scotland) Brora Rangers	Free
24 June 2019	(England) Callum Semple	(Scotland) Queen of the South	Free
24 June 2019	(Scotland) Ross Munro	(Scotland) Raith Rovers	Loan
1 July 2019	(Scotland) Scott Fox	(Scotland) Partick Thistle	Free
3 July 2019	(Scotland) Russell Dingwall	(Scotland) Elgin City	Free
16 July 2019	(Scotland) Declan McManus	(Scotland) Falkirk	Loan
24 July 2019	(Scotland) Jamie Lindsay	(England) Rotherham United	£300,000
9 September 2019	(Scotland) Joel MacBeath	(Scotland) Montrose	Loan
11 September 2019	(Scotland) James Wallace	(Scotland) Brora Rangers	Loan
11 September 2019	(Netherlands) Kenny van der Weg	(Norway) Aalesund	Free
3 October 2019	(Scotland) Daniel Armstrong	(Scotland) Raith Rovers	Free
16 January 2020	(England) Davis Keillor-Dunn	(England) Wrexham	Free
21 January 2020	(Scotland) Mark Gallagher	(Scotland) Aberdeen	Undisclosed
4 February 2020	(Scotland) Jack Ruddy	(Spain) CD Leganés	Free

== See also ==
- List of Ross County F.C. seasons
