= 2017–18 Inverness Caledonian Thistle F.C. season =

Inverness Caledonian Thistle
2017–18 season
- Chairman: Graham Rae
- Manager: John Robertson
- Stadium: Caledonian Stadium
- Championship: Fifth Place
- Scottish Challenge Cup: Winner, won against Dumbarton
- League Cup: Group Stage
- Scottish Cup: Fourth round, lost to Dundee
- Top goalscorer: League: George Oakley, Iain Vigurs (8 each); All: George Oakley (12)
- Highest home attendance: 3,415 vs. Dundee United, 5 August 2017
- Lowest home attendance: 930 vs. Peterhead, 7 October 2017
Home colours	Away colours

The 2017–18 Inverness Caledonian Thistle F.C. season was the club's first season in the Scottish Championship, having been relegated from the Scottish Premiership at the end of the 2016–17 season. Thistle will also compete in the Scottish Challenge Cup, Scottish League Cup and the Scottish Cup.

This season has seen the most postponements of any Inverness CT season, with 10 Postponements as of 18 April 2018.

== Summary ==
=== Management ===
Following the club's relegation at the end of the previous season manager Richie Foran was sacked by the club during the close season on 29 May 2017. On 14 June 2017, John Robertson was appointed as manager on a two-year contract, leaving his role of Head of Coach Education at Heart of Midlothian. Brian Rice assistant manager to Foran oversaw team affairs prior to Robertson's appointment.

== Results and fixtures ==
Win Draw Loss Postponed

=== Friendlies/Charity Games ===
1 July 2017 Friendly	Forres Mechanics	0–1	Inverness Caledonian Thistle	Forres
14:00				Stadium: Mosset Park

4 July 2017 Friendly	Brora Rangers	1–4	Inverness Caledonian Thistle	Brora
19:45				Stadium: Dudgeon Park

7 July 2017 Friendly	Nairn County	1–4	Inverness Caledonian Thistle	Nairn
19:30				Stadium: Station Park

8 July 2017 Friendly	Elgin City	2–0	Inverness Caledonian Thistle	Elgin
15:00				Stadium: Borough Briggs

8 November 2017 Charity Match	Ross County	3–2	Inverness Caledonian Thistle	Dingwall
19:00				Stadium: Victoria Park

=== Scottish Championship ===
5 August 2017 Championship	Inverness Caledonian Thistle	0–1	Dundee United	Caledonian Stadium
15:00		BBC Report	McMullan 13' (pen.)	Attendance: 3,415; Referee: Thomson

12 August 2017 Championship	Dunfermline Athletic	5–1	Inverness Caledonian Thistle	East End Park
15:00	Smith 2'; Ashcroft 14'; Cardle 41', 90'; Hopkirk 67'	BBC Report	Vigurs 18'	Attendance: 4,391; Referee: McLean

19 August 2017 Championship	Inverness Caledonian Thistle	1–1	Greenock Morton	Caledonian Stadium
15:00	Warren 19'; Seedorf (yellow card) 90' (yellow-red card)	BBC Report	Thomson 51'	Attendance: 2,202; Referee: Finnie

26 August 2017 Championship	Brechin City	0–4	Inverness Caledonian Thistle	Glebe Park
15:00		BBC Report	Vigurs 27', 73'; McKay 32'; Cooper 62'	Attendance: 703; Referee: Northcroft

9 September 2017 Championship	St Mirren	4–2	Inverness Caledonian Thistle	St Mirren Park
15:00	Morgan 31'; Buchanan 63'; Smith 73'; McShane 74'	BBC Report	Baird 61'; Polworth 69'	Attendance: 3,610; Referee: Collum

16 September 2017 Championship	Inverness Caledonian Thistle	1–3	Livingston	Caledonian Stadium
15:00	Bell 27'	BBC Report	Todorov 24'; Robinson 52'; Halkett 72'	Attendance: 2,007; Referee: Charleston

23 September 2017 Championship	Dumbarton	2–1	Inverness Caledonian Thistle	Dumbarton Football Stadium
15:00	Froxylias 46'; Wardrop 62'	BBC Report	Bell 8'; Warren (yellow card) 60' (yellow-red card) 78'	Attendance: 594; Referee: Steven

30 September 2017 Championship	Inverness Caledonian Thistle	0–0	Queen of the South	Caledonian Stadium
15:00		BBC Report		Attendance: 2,082; Referee: Anderson

14 October 2017 Championship	Falkirk	0–0	Inverness Caledonian Thistle	Falkirk Stadium
15:00		BBC Report		Attendance: 4,107; Referee: Walsh

21 October 2017 Championship	Dundee United	0–2	Inverness Caledonian Thistle	Tannadice Park
15:00		BBC Report	Vigurs 28'; Bell 36'	Attendance: 5,560; Referee: Collum

28 October 2017 Championship	Inverness Caledonian Thistle	1–0	Dunfermline Athletic	Caledonian Stadium
15:00	Bell 23'	BBC Report		Attendance: 2,948; Referee: Clancy

4 November 2017 Championship	Livingston	0–0	Inverness Caledonian Thistle	Almondvale Stadium
15:00		BBC Report		Attendance: 1,262; Referee: Duncan

21 November 2017 Championship	Inverness Caledonian Thistle	P–P	Brechin City	Caledonian Stadium
		BBC Report
Note: Postponed due to a waterlogged pitch

25 November 2017 Championship	Inverness Caledonian Thistle	0–2	St Mirren	Caledonian Stadium
	Vigurs (red card)	Report	McShane 52'Reilly 90+2'	Attendance: 2687; Referee: McKendrick

28 November 2017 Championship	Inverness Caledonian Thistle	4–0	Brechin City	Caledonian Stadium
	McKay 7' Baird 9' Bell 52' Oakley 87'	Report		Attendance: 1801; Referee: Charleston

2 December 2017 Championship	Queen of the South	0–0	Inverness Caledonian Thistle	Palmerston Park
15:00		Report		Attendance: 1293; Referee: Cook

9 December 2017 Championship	Inverness Caledonian Thistle	P–P	Falkirk	Caledonian Stadium
15:00

12 December 2017 Championship	Inverness Caledonian Thistle	P–P	Falkirk	Caledonian Stadium
19:45		BBC Report

16 December 2017 Championship	Inverness Caledonian Thistle	1–0	Dumbarton	Caledonian Stadium
15:00	Tremarco 34'	Report		Attendance: 2,103; Referee: Kirkland

23 December 2017 Championship	Greenock Morton	1–0	Inverness Caledonian Thistle	Caledonian Stadium
	Harkins 22' (pen.)	BBC Report	Raven (red card) 22'	Attendance: 1,547; Referee: Steven

30 December 2017 Championship	Brechin City	2–3	Inverness Caledonian Thistle	Glebe Park
15:00	Sinclair 18' (pen.), 39'	BBC Report	Smith 4' (Own goal); Oakley 65' 78'; Tremarco (yellow card) 67' (yellow-red card)	Attendance: 571; Referee: Duncan

2 January 2018 Championship	Inverness Caledonian Thistle	1–1	Livingston	Caledonian Stadium
15:00	Doran 6'; Vigurs (yellow card) 43' (yellow-red card)	BBC Report	Lithgow 82'	Attendance: 2239; Referee: Aitken

6 January 2018 Championship	St Mirren	1–0	Inverness Caledonian Thistle	St Mirren Park
15:00	Reilly 26'	BBC Report		Attendance: 4,448; Referee: Collum

9 January 2018 Championship	Inverness Caledonian Thistle	4–1	Falkirk	Caledonian Stadium
19:45	Oakley 10'; Bell 28'; Mulraney 30'; Baird 88'	Report	Longridge 86'	Attendance: 2,014; Referee: Beaton
Note: Rescheduled fixture due to previous postponements

13 January 2018 Championship	Inverness Caledonian Thistle	3–1	Queen of the South	Caledonian Stadium
15:00	Vigurs 3'; Chalmers 29'; Doran 58'	Report	Bell 85'	Attendance: 2,209; Referee: Muir

27 January 2018 Championship	Falkirk	3–1	Inverness Caledonian Thistle	Falkirk Stadium
15:00	Muirhead 48' (pen) 66' (pen) Nelson 87'	Report	Mulraney (yellow card) 45' (yellow-red card) MacKay 84'	Referee: Anderson

3 February 2018 Championship	Inverness Caledonian Thistle	P–P	Dundee United	Caledonian Stadium
15:00
Note: Postponed due to waterlogged pitch

17 February 2018 Championship	Dunfermline Athletic	P–P	Inverness Caledonian Thistle	East End Park
15:00
Note: Postponed due to fixture clash with Scottish Challenge Cup Semi-finals

24 February 2018 Championship	Inverness Caledonian Thistle	0–2	Greenock Morton	Caledonian Stadium
15:00		Report	Tiffoney 28' Harkins 70' (pen.)	Attendance: 2,359; Referee: Kirkland

27 February 2018 Championship	Dumbarton	P–P	Inverness Caledonian Thistle	Dumbarton Football Stadium
19:45
Note: Postponed due to Heavy Snowfall

3 March 2018 Championship	Inverness Caledonian Thistle	P–P	Brechin City	Caledonian Stadium
15:00
Note: Postponed for the safety of travelling fans from the central belt due to extremely heavy snowfall along the A9 and the most of Scotland due to "The Beast from the East"

5 March 2018 Championship	Dunfermline Athletic	P–P	Inverness Caledonian Thistle	East End Park
19:45
Note: Postponed due to Frozen pitch and Heavy Snowfall.

10 March 2018 Championship	Livingston	P–P	Inverness Caledonian Thistle	Almondvale Stadium
15:00

13 March 2018 Championship	Dunfermline Athletic	1–0	Inverness Caledonian Thistle	East End Park
19:45	Craigen 6'	Report		Attendance: 2249; Referee: Clancy

17 March 2018 Championship	Dundee United	1–1	Inverness Caledonian Thistle	Tannadice Park
15:00	Mikkelsen 64'	Report	Vigurs 30'	Attendance: 4772; Referee: Kirkland

27 March 2018 Championship	Inverness Caledonian Thistle	1–0	Dundee United	Caledonian Stadium
19:45	Doran 44'	Report		Attendance: 2,328; Referee: Aitken

31 March 2018 Championship	Inverness Caledonian Thistle	2–2	St Mirren	Caledonian Stadium
15:00	Warren 78' Polworth 81'	Report	Davis 4' (pen) Morgan 70'	Attendance: 3,025; Referee: Newlands

3 April 2018 Championship	Inverness Caledonian Thistle	4–0	Brechin City	Inverness
19:45	Chalmers 12', 58' Donaldson 22' Oakley 66'	Report		Stadium: Caledonian Stadium; Attendance: 1,963; Referee: Steven

7 April 2018 Championship	Queen of the South	0–2	Inverness Caledonian Thistle	Dumfries
15:00		Report	Austin 9' Oakley 30'	Stadium: Palmerston Park; Attendance: 1,140; Referee: Anderson

10 April 2018 Championship	Inverness Caledonian Thistle	1–0	Falkirk	Inverness
19:45	Mulraney 81'	Report		Stadium: Caledonian Stadium; Attendance: 2,053; Referee: Walsh

14 April 2018 Championship	Inverness Caledonian Thistle	5–1	Dumbarton	Inverness
15:00	Doran 17' Austin 41', 50', 66' Vigurs 63'	Report	Gallagher 13'	Stadium: Caledonian Stadium; Attendance: 2,355; Referee: Duncan

17 April 2018 Championship	Dumbarton	P–P	Inverness Caledonian Thistle	Dumbarton
19:45				Referee: Robertson
Note: Postponed due to a waterlogged pitch, game rescheduled for next day.

18 April 2018 Championship	Dumbarton	0–1	Inverness Caledonian Thistle	Dumbarton
19:45		Report	Vigurs 56'	Stadium: Dumbarton Football Stadium; Attendance: 392; Referee: Robertson

21 April 2018 Championship	Inverness Caledonian Thistle	2–2	Dunfermline Athletic	Inverness
15:00	Chalmers 16' Austin 48'		Ryan 13' Clark 90+5'	Stadium: Caledonian Stadium; Attendance: 3,316; Referee: Finnie

24 April 2018 Championship	Livingston	0–1	Inverness Caledonian Thistle	Livingston
19:45		Report	Polworth 46'	Stadium: Almondvale Stadium; Attendance: 740; Referee: Steven

28 April 2018 Championship	Greenock Morton	0–3	Inverness Caledonian Thistle	Greenock
15:00		Report	Oakley 20', 37' Austin 55'	Stadium: Cappielow Park; Attendance: 1,539; Referee: Beaton

=== League Cup ===
15 July 2017 League Cup Group A	Inverness Caledonian Thistle	3–0	Brechin City	Caledonian Stadium
15:00	Warren 21', 34'; Oakley 57'	BBC Report		Attendance: 1,419; Referee: Cook

18 July 2017 League Cup Group A	Stirling Albion	0–0	Inverness Caledonian Thistle	Forthbank Stadium
19:45		BBC Report		Attendance: 591; Referee: Roncone
Note: Inverness earn bonus point after 2 – 0 win on penalties

22 July 2017 League Cup Group A	Inverness Caledonian Thistle	0–2	Falkirk	Caledonian Stadium
15:00		BBC Report	McKee 21'; Austin 43'	Referee: Beaton

29 July 2017 League Cup Group A	Forfar Athletic	1–2	Inverness Caledonian Thistle	Station Park
15:00	Scott 49'	BBC Report	Oakley 54'; Baird 55'	Attendance: 517; Referee: Duncan

=== Scottish Challenge Cup ===
2 September 2017 Challenge Cup Second round	Aberdeen U20s	2–4	Inverness Caledonian Thistle	Glebe Park
19:45	Ross 51'; Anderson 89'	SPFL Report	Calder 4'; Polworth 25'; Raven 40'; Tremarco 82'	Attendance: 175; Referee: Newlands

7 October 2017 Challenge Cup Third round	Inverness Caledonian Thistle	3–0	Peterhead	Caledonian Stadium
15:00	Polworth 2'; Calder 51'; MacKay 90'	SPFL Report		Attendance: 930; Referee: Muir

11 November 2017 Challenge Cup Quarter-final	Inverness Caledonian Thistle	1–0	Falkirk	Caledonian Stadium
17:15	Bell 57'	BBC Report		Attendance: 1,078; Referee: Anderson

18 February 2018 Challenge Cup Semi-final	Inverness Caledonian Thistle	3–2	Crusaders (Northern Ireland)	Caledonian Stadium
17:15	Oakley 1' Chalmers 13' Mulraney 44' McKay (yellow card) 63' (yellow-red card)	Report	Heatley 57' 79' Caddell (yellow card) 90+6' (yellow-red card)	Attendance: 1,044; Referee: Bryn Markham-Jones

24 March 2018 Challenge Cup Final	Dumbarton	0–1	Inverness Caledonian Thistle	McDiarmid Park
16:15		Report	Tremarco 90+3'	Attendance: 4,602; Referee: Dallas

=== Scottish Cup ===
20 January 2018 Scottish Cup Fourth round	Dundee	2–2	Inverness Caledonian Thistle	Dens Park
15:00	Leich-Smith 47'; O'Hara 64'	Report	Doran 16'; Oakley 87'	Attendance: 3,509; Referee: Finnie

30 January 2018 Scottish Cup Fourth round replay	Inverness Caledonian Thistle	0–1	Dundee	Caledonian Stadium
19:45			Allan 47'	Attendance: 1,746; Referee: Finnie

== Squad statistics ==
During the 2017–18 season, Inverness Caledonian Thistle have used twenty-four different players in competitive games. The table below shows the number of appearances and goals scored by each player.

=== Appearances ===
As of 20 January 2018

No.	Pos	Nat	Player	Total		Championship		Challenge Cup		League Cup		Scottish Cup	
No.	Pos	Nat	Player	Apps	Goals	Apps	Goals	Apps	Goals	Apps	Goals	Apps	Goals
2	DF	(England) ENG	David Raven	22	1	15+3	0	3+0	1	1+0	0	0+0	0
3	DF	(England) ENG	Carl Tremarco	18	2	14+1	1	2+1	1	0+0	0	0+0	0
4	DF	(Scotland) SCO	Joe Chalmers	29	1	21+0	1	3+0	0	2+2	0	1+0	0
5	DF	(England) ENG	Gary Warren	14	3	9+2	1	0+0	0	2+0	2	1+0	0
6	DF	(England) ENG	Matthew Elsdon	8	0	3+0	0	0+1	0	2+2	0	0+0	0
7	MF	(Scotland) SCO	Liam Polworth	30	3	22+0	1	3+0	2	4+0	0	0+1	0
8	MF	(England) ENG	Ross Draper	5	0	1+0	0	0+0	0	4+0	0	0+0	0
8	FW	(Scotland) SCO	Nathan Austin	2	0	2+0	0	0+0	0	0+0	0	0+0	0
9	FW	(Scotland) SCO	John Baird	29	4	18+3	3	3+0	0	4+0	1	0+1	0
10	MF	(Republic of Ireland) IRL	Aaron Doran	8	3	3+3	2	0+1	0	0+0	0	1+0	1
11	MF	(Scotland) SCO	Iain Vigurs	27	5	19+0	5	3+0	0	4+0	0	1+0	0
14	FW	(England) ENG	George Oakley	27	7	8+11	4	0+3	0	3+1	2	1+0	1
15	MF	(Republic of Ireland) IRL	Jake Mulraney	23	1	13+7	1	0+0	0	2+1	0	0+0	0
16	MF	(England) ENG	Riccardo Calder	23	2	5+10	0	2+1	2	4+0	0	1+0	0
17	DF	(Netherlands) NED	Collin Seedorf	7	0	3+1	0	0+0	0	3+0	0	0+0	0
19	FW	(Curaçao) CUW	Felitciano Zschusschen	5	0	0+2	0	0+0	0	1+2	0	0+0	0
20	FW	(England) ENG	Connor Bell	24	7	16+4	6	2+0	1	0+1	0	1+0	0
21	FW	(Scotland) SCO	Alex Cooper	10	1	3+3	1	2+1	0	0+1	0	0+0	0
22	DF	(Scotland) SCO	Brad McKay	29	2	21+0	2	3+0	0	4+0	0	1+0	0
23	DF	(Scotland) SCO	Coll Donaldson	20	0	15+1	0	3+0	0	0+0	0	1+0	0
24	MF	(Canada) CAN	Charlie Trafford	17	0	10+5	0	1+0	0	0+0	0	1+0	0
25	GK	(Wales) WAL	Owain Fôn Williams	3	0	2+0	0	1+0	0	0+0	0	0+0	0
27	MF	(Scotland) SCO	Daniel MacKay	2	1	0+1	0	0+1	1	0+0	0	0+0	0
28	GK	(Scotland) SCO	Mark Ridgers	27	0	20+0	0	2+0	0	4+0	0	1+0	0

=== Overall goalscorers ===
Rank	Player	Goals
1st	(England) George Oakley	12
2nd	(Scotland) Iain Vigurs	8
3rd	(England) Connor Bell	7
4th	(England) Nathan Austin	6
5th	(Scotland) Joe Chalmers (Republic of Ireland) Aaron Doran (Scotland) Liam Polworth	5
8th	(Scotland) John Baird (England) Gary Warren	4
10th	(Republic of Ireland) Jake Mulraney (England) Carl Tremarco	3
12th	(England) Riccardo Calder (Scotland) Daniel MacKay (Scotland) Brad McKay	2
15th	(England) Alex Cooper (Scotland) Coll Donaldson (England) David Raven	1

=== Hat-tricks ===
Player	Competition	Score	Opponent	Date
(England) Nathan Austin	Scottish Championship	5–1	Dumbarton	14 April 2018

== Club statistics ==
=== League table ===
Pos	Team	Pld	W	D	L	GF	GA	GD	Pts	Promotion, qualification or relegation
3	Dundee United	36	18	7	11	52	42	+10	61	Qualification for the Premiership play-off quarter-final
4	Dunfermline Athletic	36	16	11	9	60	35	+25	59	Qualification for the Premiership play-off quarter-final
5	Inverness Caledonian Thistle	36	16	9	11	53	37	+16	57	
6	Queen of the South	36	14	10	12	59	53	+6	52	
7	Greenock Morton	36	13	11	12	47	40	+7	50	

Source: Soccerway
Rules for classification: 1) Points; 2) Goal difference; 3) Goals scored; 4) Points in head-to-head matches; 5) Goal difference in hth matches; 6). Goals scored in hth matches; 7). Play-off (only for deciding promotion, play-off participation and relegation).

==== League Cup table ====
Pos	Team	Pld	W	PW	PL	L	GF	GA	GD	Pts	Qualification	FAL	INV	STI	BRE	FOR
1	Falkirk (Q)	4	4	0	0	0	13	1	+12	12	Qualification for the Second Round	—	—	4–1	—	4–0
2	Inverness Caledonian Thistle	4	2	1	0	1	5	3	+2	8		0–2	—	—	3–0	—
3	Stirling Albion	4	2	0	1	1	6	5	+1	7		—	0–0p	—	2–0	—
4	Brechin City	4	0	1	0	3	1	9	−8	2		0–3	—	—	—	p1–1
5	Forfar Athletic	4	0	0	1	3	3	10	−7	1		—	1–2	1–3	—	—

Rules for classification: 1) goal difference, 2) goals scored, 3) away goals scored, 4) matches won, 5) away matches won, 6) drawing of lots.
(Q) Qualified to the phase indicated

=== Division summary ===
Round	1	2	3	4	5	6	7	8	9	10	11	12	13	14	15	16	17	18	19	20	21	22	23	24	25	26	27	28	29	30	31	32	33	34	35	36
Ground	H	A	H	A	A	H	A	H	A	A	H	A	H	H	A	H	A	A	H	A	H	H	A	A	A	A	A	H	H	H	A	H	A	H	A	A
Result	L	L	D	W	L	L	L	D	D	W	W	D	L	W	D	W	L	W	D	L	W	W	L	L	L	D	W	D	W	W	W	W	W	D	W	W
Position	8	12	10	7	7	8	8	9	9	8	7	7	8	8	8	7	7	7	7	7	7	6	7	8	8										5	5

Updated to match(es) played on 20 January 2018. Source:
A = Away; H = Home; W = Win; D = Draw; L = Loss

=== Management statistics ===
Last updated 18 April 2018

Name	From	To	P	W	D	L	Win% (Note: Win% is the percentage of matches won rounded to two decimal places.)
John Robertson	15 July 2017	Present	29	12	8	9	41.38

== Transfers ==
Transfers In
Player	Age*	Pos	From	Fee	Date	Notes
(Scotland) John Baird	31	ST	(Scotland) Falkirk	Free	1 July 2017	
(Scotland) Daniel Hoban	19	GK	Academy	Free	1 July 2017	
(Scotland) Mark Ridgers	26	GK	(Scotland) Partick Thistle	Free	3 July 2017	
(England) George Oakley	21	ST	(England) AFC Wimbledon	Free	3 July 2017	
(Netherlands) Collin Seedorf	22	DF	(Netherlands) RKC Waalwijk	Free	5 July 2017	
(England) Riccardo Calder	21	DF	(England) Aston Villa	Free	6 July 2017	
(Republic of Ireland) Zak Elbouzedi	19	MF	(England) West Bromwich Albion	Free	7 July 2017	
(Scotland) Joe Chalmers	23	MF	(Scotland) Motherwell	Free	13 July 2017	
(Curaçao) Felitciano Zschusschen	25	ST	(Germany) 1. FC Saarbrücken	Free	17 July 2017	
(Scotland) Alex Cooper	25	DF	(Scotland) East Fife	Free	21 July 2017	
(England) Connor Bell	21	ST	(Switzerland) Servette	Free	29 July 2017	
(Canada) Charlie Trafford	25	MF	(Finland) RoPS	Free	18 August 2017	
(Scotland) Coll Donaldson	22	DF	(Scotland) Dundee United	Free	19 August 2017	
(England) Nathan Austin	23	ST	(Scotland) Falkirk	Free	1 January 2018	

Transfers Out
Player	Age*	Pos	To	Fee	Date	Notes
(England) Greg Tansey	28	MF	(Scotland) Aberdeen	Free	1 July 2017	
(England) Alex Fisher	27	ST	(Scotland) Motherwell	Free	1 July 2017	
(Republic of Ireland) Dean Ebbe	22	ST	(Republic of Ireland) Bluebell United	Free	1 July 2017	
(England) Scott Boden	27	ST	(Wales) Wrexham	Free	6 July 2017	
(Scotland) Kevin McNaughton	34	DF	Retired	N/A	7 July 2017	
(Estonia) Henri Anier	26	ST	(Finland) FC Lahti	Free	10 July 2017	
(England) Louis Laing	24	DF	(England) Hartlepool United	Free	10 July 2017	
(Scotland) Jason Brown	21	DF	(Scotland) Peterhead	Free	14 July 2017	
(England) Lewis Horner	25	MF	(England) Blyth Spartans	Free	21 July 2017	
(England) Ross Draper	28	DF	(Scotland) Ross County	£100,000	9 August 2017	
(England) Josh Meekings	24	DF	(Scotland) Dundee	Free	18 August 2017	
(Scotland) Alex Cooper	26	DF	(United States) Fresno	Free	7 January 2018	
(England) David Raven	32	DF	(Wales) Wrexham	Free	27 January 2018	
(Curaçao) Felitciano Zschusschen	26	ST	Released	N/A	31 January 2018	

Loans In/Returns
Player	Age*	Pos	From	Duration	Date In	Date Out
(England) Matthew Elsdon	20	DF	(England) Middlesbrough	Half Season	6 July 2017	7 January 2018

Player	Age*	Pos	To	Duration	Date Out	Date In
(Scotland) Daniel Hoban	20	GK	(Scotland) Brora Rangers	Season	29 July 2017	1 May 2018
(Scotland) Cammy Mackay	20	GK	(Scotland) Brora Rangers	Emergency Loan	13 October 2017	10 November 2017
(Republic of Ireland) Zak Elbouzedi	19	MF	(Scotland) Elgin City	Emergency Loan	30 December 2017	27 January 2018
(Wales) Owain Fôn Williams	30	GK	(United States) Indy Eleven	Season	31 January 2018	30 November 2018
(Scotland) John Baird	32	FW	(Scotland) Greenock Morton	Emergency Loan	26 February 2018	30 April 2018
