= 2018 Scottish Challenge Cup final =

- Event: 2017–18 Scottish Challenge Cup
Dumbarton	Inverness Caledonian Thistle
0	1
- Date: 24 March 2018
- Venue: McDiarmid Park, Perth
- Referee: Andrew Dallas
- Attendance: 4,602

The 2018 Scottish Challenge Cup final, also known as the IRN-BRU Cup final for sponsorship reasons, was a football match that took place on 24 March 2018 at McDiarmid Park, between Dumbarton and Inverness Caledonian Thistle. It was the 27th final of the Scottish Challenge Cup since it was first organised in 1990 to celebrate the centenary of the now defunct Scottish Football League, and the fifth since the SPFL was formed. The match was won by Inverness CT 1–0 with a stoppage time winner, marking their second win in the tournament since its inception and their first silverware since the 2014–15 Scottish Cup.

== Route to the final ==
The competition is a knock-out tournament and was contested by 56 teams from Scotland, Wales, Northern Ireland and the Republic of Ireland in 2017–18. Two teams from the Republic of Ireland were added to the competition in 2017–18, following the addition of teams from Wales and Northern Ireland in 2016–17.

Those participating were the 30 clubs that played in the 2017–18 Championship, League One and League Two of the Scottish Professional Football League along with the top four teams from the 2016–17 Highland and Lowland Leagues. The top two teams from the 2016–17 Welsh Premier League and 2016–17 NIFL Premiership and the U20s squads of the teams competing in the 2016–17 Premiership were also invited to compete. Bray Wanderers and Sligo Rovers, as the League of Ireland's highest-ranked non-European participants in 2016, were also invited.

=== Dumbarton ===
Round	Opposition	Score
First round	Rangers Under-20s (h)	2–1
Second round	(Wales) Connah's Quay Nomads (h)	2–1 (a.e.t.)
Third round	Stranraer (h)	2–1
Quarter-final	Raith Rovers (h)	2–0
Semi-final	(Wales) The New Saints (a)	2–1

=== Inverness Caledonian Thistle ===
Inverness received a bye to the second round, as the team that had finished 12th in the 2016–17 Scottish Premiership.

Round	Opposition	Score
Second round	Aberdeen Under-20s (a)	4–2
Third round	Peterhead (h)	3–0
Quarter-final	Falkirk (h)	1–0
Semi-final	(Northern Ireland) Crusaders (h)	3–2

== Match details ==
24 March 2018
16:15
Final

Dumbarton	0–1	Inverness Caledonian Thistle
	Report	Tremarco 90+3'

McDiarmid Park, Perth
Attendance: 4,602
Referee: Andrew Dallas

Dumbarton	Inverness CT

Dumbarton:
GK	1	(Scotland) Scott Gallacher
RB	2	(Scotland) David Smith
CB	4	(Scotland) Andy Dowie (c) (yellow card)
CB	55	(Scotland) Craig Barr
LB	3	(Scotland) Christopher McLaughlin (yellow card)
CM	6	(Scotland) Stuart Carswell
CM	14	(Scotland) Kyle Hutton
AM	21	(Scotland) Danny Handling
FW	10	(Scotland) Tom Walsh (substituted off) 81'
FW	7	(Scotland) Calum Gallagher (yellow card) (substituted off) 74'
FW	23	(Scotland) Iain Russell (substituted off) 68'
Substitutes:
GK	19	(Scotland) Jamie Ewings
MF	5	(Scotland) Grant Gallagher
MF	8	(Scotland) David Wilson
FW	9	(Scotland) Mark Stewart (substituted on) 74'
DF	15	(Scotland) Dougie Hill
MF	20	(Cyprus) Dimitris Froxylias (substituted on) 68'
MF	31	(Scotland) Liam Burt (substituted on) 81'
Manager:
(Scotland) Stephen Aitken

- Man of the match: Coll Donaldson
- Assistant referees: David Roome & Daniel McFarlane
- Fourth official: David Munro

Inverness Caledonian Thistle:
GK	28	(Scotland) Mark Ridgers
RB	17	(Netherlands) Collin Seedorf
CB	5	(England) Gary Warren (c)
CB	23	(Scotland) Coll Donaldson (yellow card)
LB	3	(England) Carl Tremarco (yellow card)
RM	7	(Scotland) Liam Polworth
CM	11	(Scotland) Iain Vigurs
LM	4	(Scotland) Joe Chalmers
FW	14	(England) George Oakley
FW	20	(England) Connor Bell (substituted off) 78'
FW	15	(Republic of Ireland) Jake Mulraney (substituted off) 70'
Substitutes:
GK	1	(Scotland) Ryan Esson
MF	10	(Republic of Ireland) Aaron Doran (substituted on) 70'
MF	16	(England) Riccardo Calder
MF	18	(Republic of Ireland) Zak Elbouzedi
MF	24	(Canada) Charlie Trafford
MF	27	(Scotland) Daniel MacKay (substituted on) 78'
FW	32	(Scotland) Jack Brown
Manager:
(Scotland) John Robertson

Match rules

- 90 minutes.
- 30 minutes of extra-time if necessary.
- Penalty shoot-out if scores still level.
- Seven named substitutes.
- Maximum of three substitutions.
