= Aaron Doran =

Irish footballer (born 1991)

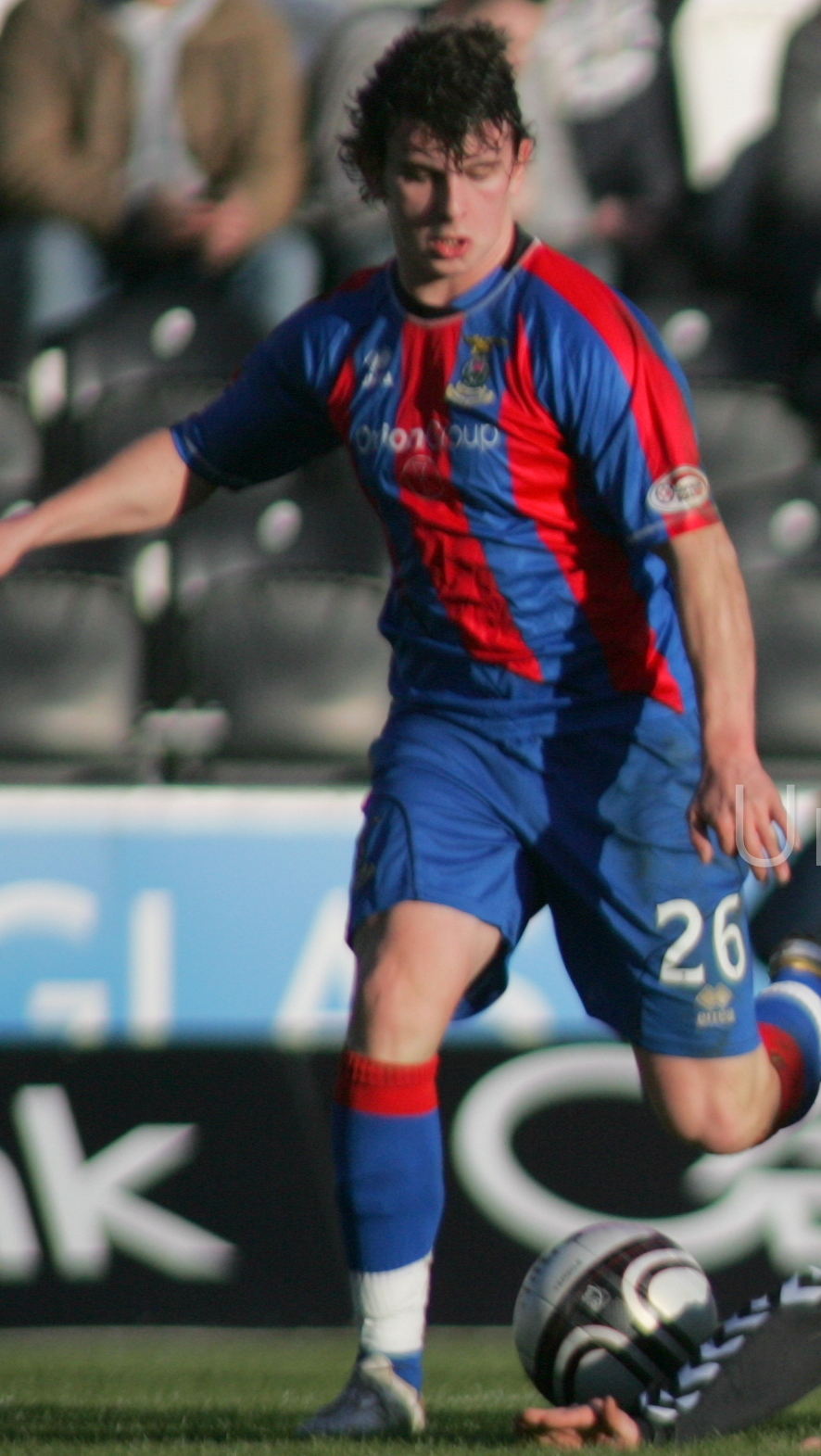
- Doran playing for Inverness in 2011

Personal information
- Full name: Aaron Brian Doran Cogan
- Date of birth: 13 May 1991 (age 35)
- Place of birth: Inchicore, Dublin, Ireland
- Height: 5 ft 7 in (1.70 m)
- Position: Winger

Team information
- Current team: Strathspey Thistle (Head Coach)

Youth career
- 2007–2008: Blackburn Rovers

Senior career*
| Years | Team | Apps | (Gls) |
| 2008–2011 | Blackburn Rovers | 3 | (0) |
| 2009 | → Milton Keynes Dons (loan) | 4 | (0) |
| 2010 | → Leyton Orient (loan) | 6 | (0) |
| 2011 | → Inverness Caledonian Thistle (loan) | 14 | (3) |
| 2011–2024 | Inverness Caledonian Thistle | 289 | (35) |
| 2024–2026 | Strathspey Thistle | 8 | (0) |

International career^{‡}
| 2011–2012 | Republic of Ireland U21 | 5 | (2) |

Managerial career
- 2026–: Strathspey Thistle
- * Club domestic league appearances and goals as of 11 October 2025 ‡ National team caps and goals as of 30 November 2013

Aaron Brian Doran Cogan (born 13 May 1991) is an Irish former professional footballer winger who is currently the manager of Highland league side Strathspey Thistle. He previously played at Blackburn Rovers, from where he spent time on loan with Milton Keynes Dons and Leyton Orient before joining Inverness Caledonian Thistle in 2011 where he would remain there until his departure in 2024. He has also represented the Republic of Ireland U21 team.

== Club career ==
=== Blackburn Rovers ===
Born in Inchicore, Dublin, Ireland, Doran started his football career at Crumlin United before he moved to Blackburn Rovers at sixteen years old. Doran progressed through the club's youth system for a year. He signed his first professional contract with Blackburn Rovers in May 2008.

Doran was involved in 2008–09 pre-season's matches against Macclesfield Town and NAC Breda, and was given the squad number 39 by manager Paul Ince. On 29 January 2009, he signed a new long–term contract with Blackburn Rovers. Doran made his first-team debut as a substitute for Aaron Mokoena against Liverpool on 11 April 2009. He later made two more appearances for the club later in the 2008–09 season. At the end of the 2008–09 season, Doran won Blackburn Rovers’ Young Player of the Year.

At the start of the 2010–11 season, Doran suffered ankle injury. However, Blackburn Rovers manager Sam Allardyce stated in October 2010 that he felt Doran had "gone backwards" since emerging as a "tremendous prospect", though Allardyce also suggested, in the same interview, that the player still had time to develop. However, he chose not to select Doran for first-team squad involvement. After Allardyce was removed from his position by Rovers' new owners, Venkys, Steve Kean listed Doran as a substitute in his first game as Blackburn's new manager.

==== Loan Spells from Milton Keynes Dons ====
On 5 October 2009, Doran was signed by League One club Milton Keynes Dons on a month's loan deal. On his debut for MK Dons, he scored his first professional goal against Southend United in a Football League Trophy tie, winning 2–0. Doran made four appearances for the club before returning to his parent club.

On 22 February 2010, Doran signed for Leyton Orient on-loan for a month. He made his debut for the club the next day, starting a match and played 83 minutes, in a 1–1 draw against Gillingham. Having played two games for Leyton Orient so far, Doran emphasized that he was keen to stay at the club for another month. Doran then set up a goal for Sean Thornton, in a 2–0 win over Walsall on 13 March 2010. A week later on 20 March 2010, he made his final appearance for the club, coming in a 2–0 loss against Huddersfield Town. On 29 March 2010, it was announced that Doran would return to Blackburn Rovers at the end of his loan.

==== Inverness Caledonian Thistle (loan) ====
In the winter transfer window of 2011, Doran was expected to be loaned out to get first team football. On 25 January 2011, he signed for Inverness Caledonian Thistle on-loan for the final six months of the 2010–11 SPL season. Inverness manager, Terry Butcher, likened him to former Watford footballer Nigel Callaghan, suggesting that Doran was part of a wider re-emergence of technically gifted footballers at the top level of British football.

He made his debut for the club the next day, coming on as an 82nd-minute substitute for Stuart Duff, in a 2–0 defeat at home to Aberdeen. On his first club start, Doran helped Inverness Caledonian Thistle beat Morton 5–1 to reach the quarter-finals of the Scottish Cup, making two 'assists'. His general performance was described as "impressive" in BBC Scotland's match report. On 12 February 2011, he scored his first goal for Inverness Caledonian Thistle, in a 3–3 draw against St Mirren. His second goal came during a 1–1 draw against Hearts on 16 April 2011, followed up scoring in the next game – a 3–0 win over St Johnstone on 25 April 2011. On 4 May 2011, Doran set up a goal for Grant Munro, in a 3–2 win against Celtic. Having been a first team regular while on loan at the club, he ended his 2010–11 season, making fourteen appearances and scoring three times in all competitions.

=== Inverness Caledonian Thistle (permanent transfer) ===
On 13 July 2011, it was announced that Doran had agreed a deal to join Inverness Caledonian Thistle permanently. He previously his desire to leave Blackburn Rovers if not guaranteed first team football and would prefer not to play for the club's reserve.

==== 2011–12 season ====
Doran's first game after signing for the club on a permanent basis came against Hibernian, coming on as a 58th-minute substitute, in a 1–0 loss on 30 July 2011. However, in a match against Kilmarnock on 28 August 2011, Doran suffered a dislocated shoulder in the 89th minute and was substituted, as Inverness Caledonian Thistle won 2–1. After the match, it was announced that he would be out for three months. By December, Doran was making a recovery from his shoulder injury and returned to training.

On 28 December 2011, he made his return from injury, coming on as a 75th-minute substitute, in a 1–0 win against Hibernian. However, Doran's return was short–lived when he suffered a knee injury that saw him out for three months. On 21 April 2012, Doran returned from injury, starting the whole game, in a loss against Aberdeen. At the end of the 2011–12 season, he made thirteen appearances in all competitions.

==== 2012–13 season ====
In the opening game of the 2012–13 season, Doran set up a goal for Nick Ross, in a 2–2 draw against St Mirren. Since the start of the 2012–13 season, he established himself in the first team, playing in the midfield position.

On 5 October 2012, Doran played his first Highland derby match against Ross County, starting the whole game and scored in a 3–1 win. In a follow–up match against Dundee, he set up two goals for Billy McKay and Gary Warren, in a 4–1 win. Doran started the match against Rangers in the quarter-finals of the 2012–13 Scottish League Cup and set up the opening goal of the game, in a 3–0 win. After the match, he was highly praised by manager Terry Butcher, saying: "If you give Aaron Doran space he'll utilise it, he'll expose teams and expose space, he's a good passer and a good supplier. He doesn't score a lot but what he does do is create a lot." After a good November, which included wins against Kilmarnock, Celtic and Aberdeen, Doran won the Scottish Premier League's Young Player of the Month for November. Between 27 November 2012 and 26 December 2012, he set up six goals in five league matches, including twice against Aberdeen. On 11 December 2012, Doran made his 50th appearance for Inverness Caledonian Thistle, in a 2–1 win against Ross County in the fourth-round replay of the Scottish Cup and helped the club go through to the next round.

During the same month, he announced his desire to stay at Inverness Caledonian Thistle and hope to be offered a new contract by manager Butcher. On 9 February 2013, Doran played as a striker for the first time and set up one of the club's only goal of the game, in a 3–1 loss against Celtic. On 5 April 2013, Butcher announced that Doran was close to signing a new contract with Inverness Caledonian Thistle, along with his colleague, David Raven. On 21 April 2013, he scored his second goal of the season, in a 4–1 loss against Celtic. On 11 May 2013, Doran scored his third goal of the season, in a 2–1 loss against Dundee United. However, on the last game of the season, he was unable to help the club qualify for the UEFA Europa League after losing 1–0 against local rivals, Ross County on the last game of the season. At the end of the 2012–13 season, Doran made forty–five appearances and scoring three times in all competitions.

After a much speculation over his future, it was announced on 28 May 2013 that Doran signed a new three-year contract with Inverness Caledonian Thistle.

==== 2013–14 season ====
In the opening game of the 2013–14 season, Doran started off very well he scored and set up one of the goals, in a 3–0 win over St Mirren. Three weeks later on 24 August 2013, Doran scored his second goal of the season, in a 2–2 draw against Celtic. Since the start of the 2013–14 season, he continued to establish himself in the first team, playing in the midfield position.

On 2 November 2013, Doran scored third goal of the season, in a 2–1 win against Kilmarnock. On 30 November 2013, he scored and set up one of the goals, in a 4–0 win against Greenock Morton in the fourth round of the Scottish Cup. On 1 January 2014, Doran scored his fourth goal of the season, in a 2–1 loss against local rivals, Ross County. He then scored two goals in both matches against Stranraer in the last 16 of the Scottish Cup, as Inverness Caledonian Thistle won 2–0 in the replay. On 25 February 2014, Doran set up two goals, in a 3–0 win against local rivals, Ross County. However, he suffered a thigh injury that saw him out for one match.

On 12 March 2014, Doran made his return to the starting line–up, playing 78 minutes before being substituted, in a 0–0 draw against Hibernian. He played in the Scottish League Cup Final against Aberdeen, coming on as a 63rd-minute substitute for James Vincent and converted the fourth penalty in the shootout, as the club lost 4–2 on penalties after a 0–0 draw. After the match, Doran said he was disappointed to not start the match, due to John Hughes "accommodating the stifling strategy", but acknowledged the defeat. However, in a follow–up match against Motherwell on 19 March 2014, Draper suffered a hamstring injury and was substituted at half-time, as Inverness Caledonian Thistle loss 2–0.

After the match, he was out for four matches with the injury. But he returned to the starting line–up against local rivals, Ross County on 4 April 2014 and played a vital role in match by scoring the opening goal of the game before setting a goal for Billy Mckay, in a 2–1 win. At the end of the 2013–14 season, Doran made forty–one appearances and scoring eight goals in all competitions.

==== 2014–15 season ====
The 2014–15 season started well for Doran, as the club earned 13 points in the first six matches. Of those first six matches, he scored against Motherwell, Kilmarnock and against Partick Thistle on 16 August 2014, 30 August 2014 and 13 September 2014 respectively. However, in October, Doran found his playing time reduced and was placed on the substitute bench.

By December, he soon won back his place in the starting eleven, playing in the midfield position. On 1 January 2015, Doran scored twice and set up a goal for Mckay in a 3–1 win against local rivals, Ross County. However, he suffered a groin injury that saw him out for three matches.

On 28 February 2015, Doran made his return to the first team from injury, coming on as a substitute for Nick Ross in the 73rd-minute, in a 2–1 loss against Motherwell. Following his return from injury, he continued to rotate between the starting eleven and substitute bench for the rest of the season. On 2 May 2015, Doran scored his sixth goal of the season, in a 1–1 draw against St Johnstone. In the Scottish Cup Final, Doran started as a left-midfielder, where he set up the opener for Marley Watkins, in a 2–1 win over Falkirk to win their first ever Scottish Cup Final. At the end of the 2014–15 season, Doran made thirty–eight appearances and scoring six times in all competitions.

==== 2015–16 season and 2016–17 season ====
At the start of the 2015–16 season, Doran made his European football debut, playing in both legs against FC Astra Giurgiu in the UEFA Europa League second qualifying round, losing 1–0 on aggregate and Inverness Caledonian Thistle was eliminated in the tournament. Both of the matches would turn out to be his only appearances in the 2015–16 season. However, he suffered a knee injury and after having a surgery, the injury kept him out for the rest of the 2015–16 season. It came after when Doran suffered a knee injury during the club's friendly match against Forres Mechanics. Despite this, manager Hughes was keen on keeping Doran by offering a new contract. On 17 May 2016, he signed a two–year contract with Inverness Caledonian Thistle.

Ahead of the 2016–17 season, manager Richie Foran said Doran was making progress towards his recovery from his knee injury. On 9 August 2016, he made his first appearance in over a year, coming on as a 74th-minute substitute, in a 1–0 loss against Alloa Athletic in the last 16 of the Scottish League Cup. After the match, Doran said he's determined to come back stronger. Following his return from injury, Doran alternated between the starting line–up and substitute bench. On 29 October 2016, he scored his first goal in over a year, in a 3–3 draw against Hearts. After missing one match due to a knock, Doran made his return to the starting line–up, in a 3–1 loss against Aberdeen on 19 November 2016. Upon returning from injury, he reflected, saying: "I'm a bit older now and I don't go out as much. I was out for the whole season last year so I take pride in my work now. I go to training and try to learn things, whereas, a few years ago, I was just going through the motions. Now I look at what I can improve – I want more goals and I want to help the team move up."

After missing two matches in January, he made his return, coming on as a 63rd-minute substitute, in a 1–1 draw against Hearts on 18 February 2017. However, Doran, once again, suffered a knee injury that kept him out for the rest of the season. At the end of the 2016–17 season, he made nineteen appearances and scoring once in all competitions.

==== 2017–18 season ====
Doran continued to recover from his knee injury at the start of the 2017–18 season. On 11 November 2017, he made his first appearance of the season, coming on as a 71st-minute substitute, in a 1–0 win against Falkirk. Since returning from injury, Doran spent on the substitute bench between November and January.

On 2 January 2018, he scored his first goal of the season, in a 1–1 draw against Livingston. Doran scored against Queen of the South and Dundee on 13 January 2018 and 20 January 2018 respectively. He continued to alternate between the starting line–up and substitute bench throughout the second half of the season. On 24 March 2018, Doran came on as 70th-minute substitute in the Scottish Challenge Cup final against Dumbarton and helped Inverness Caledonian Thistle win 1–0 to win a trophy. Three days later on 27 March 2018, he scored his fourth goal of the season, in a 1–0 win against Dundee United. Two weeks later on 14 April 2018, Doran scored his fifth goal of the season and set up one of the goal for Nathan Austin, who scored a hat–trick, in a 5–1 win against Dumbarton. At the end of the 2017–18 season, he made twenty–two appearances and scoring five times in all competitions. Following this, Doran signed a two–year contract extension with the club.

==== 2018–19 season ====
Ahead of the 2018–19 season, Doran was appointed as a vice–captain of Inverness Caledonian Thistle, with teammate Carl Tremarco appointed as captain. He then scored his first goals of the season, in a 5–2 win against Cowdenbeath in the group stage of the Scottish League Cup. Since the start of the season, he continued to regain his first team place, playing in the midfield position.

Doran then played a role against Dunfermline Athletic on 1 September 2018 when he set up two goals, in a 3–0 win. Doran captained the club in several matches in absence of Tremarco during the 2018–19 season. His regular run as captain happened for the rest of 2018 when Tremarco was absent due to a hamstring injury. On 4 December 2018, he scored his third goal of the season, in a 6–1 win against Edinburgh City in the fourth round of the Scottish Cup. On 22 December 2018, Doran scored his fourth goal of the season, in a 2–1 win against Greenock Morton. He then scored against East Kilbride and Falkirk on 19 January 2019 and 26 January 2019 respectively. However, Doran suffered a groin injury that saw him out for two matches. On 11 February 2019, he returned to the starting line–up against local rivals, Ross County in the last 16 of the Scottish Cup and scored in a 2–2 draw. Doran then scored against Dundee United, Queen of the South, Partick Thistle and Alloa Athletic on 3 March 2019, 9 March 2019, 22 March 2019 and 29 March 2019 respectively.

His performance was praised by teammate Charlie Trafford saying that "Doran's renaissance has been brilliant to watch". For his performance, he was named March's Scottish Championship Player of the Month. Doran later stated that his target of helping Inverness Caledonian Thistle's promotion to the Scottish Premiership was his number one priority. He later captained the club in all four matches in the Premiership play-offs. However, Doran's target to Inverness Caledonian Thistle's promotion to the Scottish Premiership failed when the club loss 3–0 in the return leg. At the end of the 2018–19 season, he made forty–eight appearances and scoring eleven times in all competitions, his highest goal tally of the season.

For his performance in the 2018–19 season, Doran, alongside Liam Polworth, were named PFA Scotland Scottish Championship Team of the Year. Reflecting on the 2018–19 season, he said: "Overall that was my 48th game, so to spend two years out with injuries then come back and play 48 games, you can see I’ve put my injuries behind me now."

==== 2019–20 season ====
The 2019–20 season was Doran's tenth season at Inverness Caledonian Thistle. Ahead of the 2019–20 season, he said about the club's target: "I think Inverness Caledonian Thistle is being run a lot better as well, so everything is on the up at the moment. I'm sure they will be signing a few more players so I think this season we will be pushing to try to win the league. That will be the main objective. I know it probably was the aim last season as well, but with the players we have and with everything else at the club positive, that's what we have to be aiming for." After missing one match due to a knock, Doran scored on his return from injury, in a 4–1 win against Raith Rovers in the group stage of the Scottish League Cup. Despite suffering a finger injury in training prior to the match against Arbroath on 10 August 2019, he eventually started the match and scored the equalising goal, as Inverness Caledonian Thistle won 2–1. In both matches against Greenock Morton in the league and Scottish Challenge Cup on 30 August 2019 and 7 September 2019 respectively, Doran played a role when he set up a goal in a 5–0 win in their first meeting of the season and in their second meeting of the season, he scored his third goal of the season as captain, in a 3–1 win.

Since returning from injury, Doran continued to regain his first team place, playing in the midfield position. After missing one match, he scored on his return from injury, in a 2–0 win against Queen of the South on 29 October 2019. Doran then scored against Dundee and Alloa Athletic on 23 November 2019 and 30 November 2019 respectively. He, once again, scored against Dundee and Alloa Athletic for the second time this season on 4 January 2020 and 18 January 2020. Manager John Robertson praised Doran's performance, saying: "It's January so it's Aaron Doran time. Scott Kellacher has a laugh with him. He winds him up every year, saying as soon as Christmas and New Year is out the way Aaron starts to play well because that's when the votes come out for the player of the year and team of the year awards, which Aaron gets in about every year. Wingers will have feasts and famines. Aaron went through a tough time, he had seven or eight games where he just wasn't at his normal high standards. He was frustrated. He also knows with his experience that he will play through that. Had we had Tom Walsh available at the time, he may have got a bit more of a rest. We may have switched it over and looked at something different. He had to keep going, and he has played through it. He's now looking very dangerous, he looks like the Aaron Doran we know can hurt teams."

After missing one match due to ankle injury, Doran made his return from injury, coming on as a 79th-minute substitute, against Rangers B team in the semi–finals of the Scottish Challenge Cup and helped the club, in a 2–1 win to reach the final. He then scored his ninth goal of the season, in a 2–1 win against Dunfermline Athletic on 25 February 2020. However, Inverness Caledonian Thistle finished second in the 2019–20 Scottish Championship, which was curtailed due to the coronavirus pandemic and the Scottish Challenge Cup final was cancelled. Despite this, Doran made thirty–five appearances and scoring nine times in all competitions. On 2 June 2020, he signed a contract extension with the club.

==== 2020–21 season ====
Following the departure of Carl Tremarco, there were calls from Doran's former teammate Gary Warren that he should be the next Inverness Caledonian Thistle's captain. Instead, Sean Welsh was named as the club's next captain, while Doran remains as the vice-captain. However at the start of the 2020–21 season, he suffered a knee injury that saw him out for the Inverness Caledonian Thistle's first four matches of the season. On 31 October 2020, Doran made his first appearance of the season, coming as an 84th-minute substitute, in a 3–1 win against Arbroath. In a follow–up match against Hearts, he scored a late consolation, in a 2–1 loss.

Doran acknowledged that he would fight for his first team place with the incoming youngsters at Inverness Caledonian Thistle. However, during a match against Dunfermline Athletic on 29 December 2020, Doran suffered a concussion and was substituted at half-time, as the match ended in a 1–1 draw. On 27 January 2021, he made his return to the starting line–up against Greenock Morton and set up one of the goals, in a 2–2 draw. However, his return was short–lived when Doran suffered a thigh injury in training and was out for weeks. On 9 March 2021, he made his return from injury, coming on as a 53rd-minute substitute, in a 1–0 loss against Greenock Morton.

However, Doran did not play for two months, with the club's manager Billy Dodds stating that: "we need to be careful with him as he suffered a recurrence the last time, but he is looking good for training time." But Doran returned from injury, coming on as a 68th-minute substitute, in a 2–2 draw against Ayr United in the last game of the season. At the end of the 2020–21 season, he made thirteen appearances and scoring once in all competitions.

==== 2021–22 season ====
In Inverness Caledonian Thistle's first match of the 2021–22 season, Doran scored his first goal of the season, from a 25-yard strike, in a 2–0 win against Peterhead in the group stage of the Scottish League Cup. After the match, he said it was the best goals scored of his career. Manager Billy Dodds also praised Doran's performance, including his goal. However, he suffered a thigh injury that saw him out for two matches. On 7 August 2021, Doran returned from injury, coming on as an 81st-minute substitute, in a 1–0 win against Raith Rovers. On 11 September 2021, he scored his second goal of the season, in a 3–1 win against Partick Thistle. However, in a match against Dunfermline Athletic on 18 September 2021 (also his 300th appearance for the club), Doran suffered a thigh injury and was substituted at half-time, as the match ended in a 1–1 draw.

After missing two matches, he returned to the first team, coming on as a 61st-minute substitute, in a 2–0 win against Greenock Morton on 16 October 2021. Since returning from injury, Doran regained his first team place, playing in the midfield position. However, in a match against Hamilton Academical on 18 December 2021, Doran suffered a thigh injury and was substituted in the 38th minute, as Inverness Caledonian Thistle loss 2–1. But on 2 January 2022, he made his return to the starting line–up from injury against Arbroath, only for him to suffer a thigh injury and was substituted in the 44th minute, as the match ended in a 0–0 draw. After the match, Doran was out for a month with an injury.

On 19 February 2022, he returned from injury, coming on as a 78th-minute substitute, and set up a late consolation goal, in a 2–1 loss against Ayr United. Since returning from injury, Doran regained his first team place towards the end of the 2021–22 season and helped the club secure a place in the Premiership play-offs. In the semi–finals of the Premiership play-offs against Arbroath, he played in both legs to help the club reach the final after beating them on penalties. Doran played in both legs of the Premiership play–offs final against St Johnstone, as Inverness Caledonian Thistle loss 6–2 on aggregate. At the end of 2021–22 season, he made thirty–nine appearances and scoring two times in all competitions. Following this, Doran signed a one–year contract extension with the club.

==== 2022–23 season ====
Ahead of the 2022–23 season, Doran said: "I didn't even realise this was going to be my 12th season – but I want to make this one of my best. I want to be as fit as I can be and be on the pitch and score as many goals as I possibly can." On 13 August 2022, he scored his first goal of the season, in a 4–1 win against Cove Rangers. However, Doran suffered a thigh injury that saw him out for two matches. On 17 September 2022, he made his return from injury, coming on as a 40th-minute substitute, in a 3–2 win against Dundee.

Since returning from injury, Doran alternated between the substitute bench and the starting eleven at Inverness Caledonian Thistle. He acknowledged the lack of first team, saying: "I'm not happy when I don't start, so when I come on I want to make an impact. I think I did that on Saturday, which is good, but I want to be starting every game. It's a bit disappointing to find out you're on the bench, but you just have to try and make an impact when you're called upon. I don't really understand why I haven't played more, because I think I have all the qualities to be one of our best players – and one of the best players in this league. I think I've shown that over the years. Maybe it's because I haven't scored enough goals, but I create chances in every game and I get through on goal – just unfortunately I haven't taken enough of them. That could be part of the reason, but I'm obviously disappointed not to be playing from the start. We'll see what happens between now and the end of the season."

On 26 November 2022, Doran scored and set up one of the goals on his 350th appearance for the club, in a 3–2 win against Stirling Albion in the third round of the Scottish Cup. On 23 December 2022, he scored his third goal of the season, in a 5–1 loss against Partick Thistle. On 15 April 2023, Doran came on as a 59th-minute substitute and set up two goals, in a 2–1 win against Cove Rangers. Doran then came on as a 73rd-minute substitute, in a 3–0 win against Falkirk to reach the Scottish Cup final. In the final, he came on as an 81st-minute substitute, in a 3–1 loss against Celtic. At the end of the 2022–23 season, Doran made forty appearances and scoring three times in all competitions. Following this, he signed a one-year contract extension with Inverness Caledonian Thistle.

==== 2023–24 season ====
On 15 July 2023, Doran scored twice in a 2–1 win against Bonnyrigg Rose in the group stage of the Scottish League Cup. After the match, local newspaper The Press and Journal praised his performance, while manager Dodds believe that Inverness Caledonian Thistle supporters will see the different side of him. However, he found his playing time, coming from the substitute bench. On 30 September 2023, Doran scored his third goal of the season, in a 3–2 win against Arbroath. However, during a match against Partick Thistle on 7 October 2023, he suffered a hamstring injury and was substituted in the 65th minute, as the match ended in a 0–0 draw. After the match, Doran was out for three months with a hamstring injury.

On 12 January 2024, he made his return from injury, coming on as a late substitute, in a 1–0 loss against Dundee United. After the match, Doran said: "After being out for just over three months, it was good to be back. It was hard being in the gym when the lads were playing, but I have done it all before, so it wasn't too bad this time. I had been back training for a couple of weeks, so I felt ready to go whenever the manager called me. The manager makes every player feel welcome. When you're injured, you're obviously not in his plans." On 10 February 2024, he scored his fourth goal of the season, in a 3–1 loss against Hibernian in the fifth round of the Scottish Cup, eliminating the club from the tournament. Following his return from injury, Doran's playing time to continue to come from the substitute bench. This was due to suffering from knocks on two separate occasions towards the end of the 2023–24 season. However, in a match against Raith Rovers on 19 April 2024, he suffered a knee injury and was substituted in the 19th minute, as Inverness Caledonian Thistle loss 1–0. After the match, Doran was out for the rest of the 2023–24 season. Following this, Inverness Caledonian Thistle was eventually relegated to Scottish League One after a 5–3 aggregate defeat to Hamilton Academical. At the end of the 2023–24 season, he made twenty–two appearances and scoring four times in all competitions.

Doran's future at the club became uncertain, as he was yet to be offered a new contract with his contract expiring at the end of the 2023–24 season. On 11 June 2024, Doran told STV news that Inverness Caledonian Thistle had twice cancelled surgery for an injury he sustained whilst playing for club, following this the club received a lot of backlash prompting former teammate Shane Sutherland to set up a Go Fund me to pay for surgery with many Players, Managers and Fans donating to the cause. Shortly before he received surgery for his injury, he confirmed that he had received confirmation from the club that they would not be renewing his contract, ending his fourteen years association with Inverness Caledonian Thistle.

==== Testimonial match ====
Having spent ten years at Inverness Caledonian Thistle, Doran revealed the club is planning to include a testimonial match for him. However, the plans were delayed for years, due to his injuries. It was announced on 13 June 2025 that Doran's testimonial match would be against local rivals, Ross County on 5 July 2025. He came on as a 72nd-minute substitute, in a 2–0 loss on 5 July 2025. Doran "was given a guard of honour in front of a crowd of around 2,000 at the Caledonian Stadium".

=== Strathspey Thistle ===
On 15 August 2024, Doran was appointed as a Player/Coach to be a part of former Inverness Caledonian Thistle goalkeeper and coach, Ryan Esson's coaching staff at Strathspey Thistle. He also gained a UEFA B Licence coaching badge. However, Doran made no appearances throughout the 2024–25 season, as he was recovering from his injury. Doran signed a contract with Strathspey Thistle.

After a year without playing, he made his debut for the club in a 3–1 win against Keith in the opening game of the season. On 13 August 2025, Doran set up two goals in a 4–1 win against Buckie Thistle. However, in a match against his former club, Inverness Caledonian Thistle, in the quarter-finals of the North of Scotland Cup, he suffered an injury and was substituted in the 34th minute, as Strathspey Thistle lost 6–0. On 8 October 2025, Doran made his return from injury, coming on as a 58th-minute substitute, in a 2–1 loss against Forres Mechanics. However, his return was short–lived when he suffered an injury that kept him out for weeks.

== Managerial career ==
On 24 February 2026, after the shock sacking of manager, and former Inverness team-mate, Ryan Esson, Doran hung up his boots, and was appointed manager of Strathspey Thistle.

== International career ==
In December 2005, Doran was called up to the Republic of Ireland U15 squad for the first time. He made two appearances, including scoring against Netherlands U15.

In September 2006, Doran was called up to the Republic of Ireland U16 squad, making his debut, in a 1–1 draw against France U16. He made another appearance for the U16 side, losing 1–0 against Finland U16 on 4 October 2006. In September 2007, Doran was called up to the Republic of Ireland U17 squad and scored in a 2–0 win against Denmark U17. He helped the under-17 side qualify for the UEFA European Under-17 Championship after setting up one of the goals to beat Portugal U17 2–0 on 18 March 2008. The following month saw Doran called up to the squad for the tournament. He played three times in the tournament, as Republic of Ireland U17 were eliminated in the group stage.

In November 2008, Doran was called up to the Republic of Ireland U19 squad and made his debut for the under-19 side, in a 1–0 win against Liechtenstein U19 on 23 November 2008. In a follow–up match against France U19, he was sent–off for a second bookable offence, in a 2–0 loss. On 10 June 2009, Doran scored his first goal for Republic of Ireland U19, in a 2–1 win against the Sweden U19. On 15 November 2009, he scored his second goal for the under-19 side, in a 2–0 win against Albania U19. On 7 April 2010, Doran scored his third goal for Republic of Ireland U19, in a 4–2 win against Poland U19.

In January 2011, Doran was called up to the Republic of Ireland U21 for the first time. He made his under-21 debut, starting a match and played 45 minutes before being substituted, in a 0–0 draw against Cyprus U21 on 9 February 2011. After a year absent, Doran was called up to the Republic of Ireland U21 squad on 3 September 2012. Three days later on 6 September 2012, he made his first appearance for under-21 side in over a year, in a 2–1 loss against Hungary U21. In a follow–up match, Doran scored his first goals for Republic of Ireland U21 and scored twice, in a 4–2 win against Italy U21.

== Personal life ==
Growing up, Doran was a boyhood Celtic supporter. He was a ballboy for St Patrick's Athletic matches.

In February 2015, Doran and teammate Danny Devine were fined £40 fixed penalty notices after causing a late-night disturbance. Following this, the club's assistant manager Russell Latapy said he hoped the pair would learn from their mistake. He reflected on the incident, saying he let himself down and should have ignored it.

Doran is married and with his partner, they have three daughters. Having spent a decade in Scotland, he has settled in the country.

== Career statistics ==
As of match played on 19 April 2024

Appearances and goals by club, season and competition
| Club | Season | League | | | National Cup | | League Cup | | Other | | Total | |
| Club | Season | Division | Apps | Goals | Apps | Goals | Apps | Goals | Apps | Goals | Apps | Goals |
|---|---|---|---|---|---|---|---|---|---|---|---|---|
| Blackburn Rovers | 2008–09 | Premier League | 3 | 0 | 0 | 0 | 0 | 0 | – | | 3 | 0 |
| Blackburn Rovers | 2009–10 | Premier League | 0 | 0 | 0 | 0 | 0 | 0 | – | | 0 | 0 |
| Blackburn Rovers | 2010–11 | Premier League | 0 | 0 | 0 | 0 | 0 | 0 | – | | 0 | 0 |
| Blackburn Rovers | Total | | 3 | 0 | 0 | 0 | 0 | 0 | 0 | 0 | 3 | 0 |
| Milton Keynes Dons (loan) | 2009–10 | League One | 4 | 0 | 0 | 0 | 0 | 0 | 1 (Note: Appearance in the Football League Trophy) | 0 | 5 | 0 |
| Leyton Orient (loan) | 2009–10 | League One | 6 | 0 | 0 | 0 | 0 | 0 | 0 | 0 | 6 | 0 |
| Inverness Caledonian Thistle (loan) | 2010–11 | Scottish Premier League | 14 | 3 | 2 | 0 | 0 | 0 | — | | 16 | 3 |
| Inverness Caledonian Thistle | 2011–12 | Scottish Premier League | 10 | 0 | 1 | 0 | 1 | 0 | — | | 12 | 0 |
| Inverness Caledonian Thistle | 2012–13 | Scottish Premier League | 38 | 3 | 3 | 0 | 4 | 0 | — | | 45 | 3 |
| Inverness Caledonian Thistle | 2013–14 | Scottish Premiership | 33 | 5 | 4 | 3 | 4 | 0 | — | | 41 | 8 |
| Inverness Caledonian Thistle | 2014–15 | Scottish Premiership | 33 | 6 | 4 | 0 | 1 | 0 | — | | 38 | 6 |
| Inverness Caledonian Thistle | 2015–16 | Scottish Premiership | 0 | 0 | 0 | 0 | 0 | 0 | 2 (Note: Appearances in the UEFA Europa League) | 0 | 2 | 0 |
| Inverness Caledonian Thistle | 2016–17 | Scottish Premiership | 17 | 1 | 1 | 0 | 1 | 0 | — | | 19 | 1 |
| Inverness Caledonian Thistle | 2017–18 | Scottish Championship | 18 | 4 | 2 | 1 | 0 | 0 | 2 (Note: Appearances in the Scottish Challenge Cup) | 0 | 22 | 5 |
| Inverness Caledonian Thistle | 2018–19 | Scottish Championship | 33 | 5 | 6 | 4 | 4 | 2 | 5 (Note: 1 appearance in the Scottish Challenge Cup & 4 appearances in the Playoffs) | 0 | 48 | 11 |
| Inverness Caledonian Thistle | 2019–20 | Scottish Championship | 26 | 6 | 2 | 1 | 3 | 1 | 4 | 1 | 35 | 9 |
| Inverness Caledonian Thistle | 2020–21 | Scottish Championship | 11 | 1 | 0 | 0 | 2 | 0 | — | | 13 | 1 |
| Inverness Caledonian Thistle | 2021–22 | Scottish Championship | 26 | 1 | 2 | 0 | 3 | 1 | 8 (Note: 3 appearances in the Scottish Challenge Cup & 5 appearances in the Playoffs) | 0 | 39 | 2 |
| Inverness Caledonian Thistle | 2022–23 | Scottish Championship | 29 | 2 | 6 | 1 | 4 | 0 | 1 | 0 | 40 | 3 |
| Inverness Caledonian Thistle | 2023–24 | Scottish Championship | 15 | 1 | 2 | 1 | 4 | 2 | 1 | 0 | 22 | 4 |
| Inverness Caledonian Thistle | Total | | 289 | 35 | 33 | 11 | 31 | 6 | 23 | 1 | 376 | 53 |
| Strathspey Thistle | 2024–25 | Highland League | 0 | 0 | 0 | 0 | 0 | 0 | 0 | 0 | 0 | 0 |
| Career total | | | 316 | 38 | 35 | 11 | 31 | 6 | 24 | 1 | 406 | 56 |

== Honours ==
Inverness Caledonian Thistle

- Scottish Cup: 2014–15
- Scottish Challenge Cup: 2017–18

=== Individual awards ===
- Football Association of Ireland’s under-17 award: 2009
- SPL Young Player of the Month: November 2012
- Scottish Championship Player of the Month: March 2019
- PFA Scotland Team of the Year (Championship): 2018–19
