= Connor Bell =

Connor Bell may refer to:

- Connor Bell (footballer)
- Connor Bell (athlete)
- Connor Bell (racing driver)
