= Mark Gallagher (footballer) =

Scottish footballer

Personal information
- Date of birth: 12 February 2001 (age 25)
- Place of birth: Elgin, Scotland
- Height: 1.82 m (6 ft 0 in)
- Position: Midfielder

Team information
- Current team: Elgin City
- Number: 10

Youth career
- –2018: Ross County

Senior career*
Years	Team	Apps	(Gls)
2018–2020	Ross County	2	(0)
2020–2022	Aberdeen	0	(0)
2021–2022	→ Forfar Athletic (loan)	12	(1)
2022	→ Cliftonville (loan)	0	(0)
2022–2023	Formartine United	34	(6)
2023–2024	Cove Rangers	8	(1)
2024	→ Elgin City (loan)	17	(1)
2024–	Elgin City	61	(7)
- * Club domestic league appearances and goals as of 4 May 2026

Mark Gallagher (born 12 February 2001) is a Scottish professional footballer who plays as a midfielder for Scottish League Two club Elgin City.

He made his League debut for Ross County against Greenock Morton in the Scottish Championship, coming on as a substitute. He joined Aberdeen in January 2020 on a two-and-a-half-year contract. In June 2021, Gallagher joined Scottish League Two side Forfar Athletic on a season-long loan. On 29 January 2022, Gallagher joined NIFL Premiership side Cliftonville on loan for the remainder of the 2021–22 season. After being released by Aberdeen in June 2022, Gallagher joined Highland League side Formartine United.

On 30 July 2024, Gallagher returned to Elgin City on a two-year deal, after playing for the club on loan earlier in the year.

== Career statistics ==
As of match played 10 May 2025

Appearances and goals by club, season and competition
Club	Season	League			Cup		League Cup		Other		Total	
Club	Season	Division	Apps	Goals	Apps	Goals	Apps	Goals	Apps	Goals	Apps	Goals
Ross County Under 20s	2016–17	-	0	0	0	0	0	0	1 (Note: Appearances in the Scottish Challenge Cup)	0	1	0
Ross County Under 20s	2019–20	-	0	0	0	0	0	0	2	2	2	2
Ross County Under 20s	Total		0	0	0	0	0	0	0	0	3	2
Ross County	2018–19	Scottish Championship	2	0	0	0	0	0	1	0	3	0
Ross County	2019–20	Scottish Premiership	0	0	0	0	0	0	0	0	0	0
Ross County	Total		2	0	0	0	0	0	1	0	3	0
Aberdeen	2020–21	Scottish Premiership	0	0	0	0	0	0	0	0	0	0
Aberdeen	2021–22	Scottish Premiership	0	0	0	0	0	0	0	0	0	0
Aberdeen	Total		0	0	0	0	0	0	0	0	0	0
Forfar Athletic (loan)	2021–22	Scottish League Two	12	1	0	0	3	1	2	0	17	2
Cove Rangers	2023–24	Scottish League One	8	0	0	0	4	1	1	0	13	1
Cove Rangers	2024–25	Scottish League One	0	0	0	0	3	0	0	0	3	0
Cove Rangers	Total		8	0	0	0	7	1	1	0	16	1
Elgin City (loan)	2023–24	Scottish League Two	17	1	0	0	0	0	0	0	17	1
Elgin City	2024–25	Scottish League Two	34	5	3	0	0	0	4 (Note: Two appearances in the Scottish Challenge Cup and two in the League One play-offs)	0	41	5
Career total			73	7	3	0	10	2	11	2	97	11
