= Matthew Elsdon =

English footballer

Personal information
- Full name: Matthew Elsdon
- Date of birth: 24 June 1997 (age 29)
- Place of birth: Durham, England
- Height: 5 ft 11 in (1.80 m)
- Position: Centre-back

Team information
- Current team: Hebburn Town

Youth career
- –2011: Sunderland
- 2011–2015: Middlesbrough

Senior career*
Years	Team	Apps	(Gls)
2015–2018	Middlesbrough	0	(0)
2017	→ Inverness Caledonian Thistle (loan)	9	(0)
2018–2020	Barrow	5	(0)
2019	→ Whitby Town (loan)	11	(0)
2020	→ FC United of Manchester (loan)	6	(0)
2020–2021	Blyth Spartans	15	(0)
2021–2022	Clyde	36	(1)
2022–2023	Blyth Spartans	35	(0)
2023–	Hebburn Town	0	(0)

International career^{‡}
2013–2014	England U17	4	(0)
- * Club domestic league appearances and goals as of 29 February 2020 ‡ National team caps and goals as of 01:29, 9 May 2022 (UTC)

Matthew Elsdon (born 24 June 1997) is an English professional footballer who plays as a centre-back for Hebburn Town.

== Club career ==
=== Middlesbrough ===
Having previously played for Sunderland as a striker, Elsdon joined the Middlesbrough Academy at the age of 14 and subsequently converted to the role of centre-back. He has since become a regular in Premier League 2 and played in every game for his club in the 2015–16 UEFA Youth League.

On 22 May 2018, Middlesbrough announced that Elsdon would not be offered a new contract, ending his 7-year association with the club.

=== Inverness CT (loan) ===
On 7 July 2017, Middlesbrough announced that Elsdon would be joining Inverness Caledonian Thistle on an initial 6-month loan deal, with a view to an extension until the end of the season. Elsdon made his debut for the club in the Scottish League Cup, coming on as a late substitute against Brechin City for Iain Vigurs. He would later make his league debut on the first day of the Scottish Championship season, starting in a 0–1 loss against Dundee United at the Caledonian Stadium.

=== Barrow ===
On 12 July 2018 he signed for National League side Barrow. Following promotion to the football league at the end of the 2019-20 season, Elsdon was released by Barrow.

=== Whitby Town (loan) ===
In August 2019 he joined Whitby Town on a month's loan.

=== FC United of Manchester (loan) ===
In January 2020 he joined FC United of Manchester on loan.

=== Blyth Spartans ===
In the summer of 2020 he joined Blyth.

=== Clyde ===
In August 2021 he moved to Clyde. On 3 May 2022, it was announced that Elsdon was one of ten players released by the club following the end of the 2021–22 season.

=== Non-League ===
In June 2023, Elsdon signed for Northern Premier League Division One East club Hebburn Town.

== International career ==
Elsdon's 4 caps at international level came in the 2013 Nordic Under-17 Football Championship.

== Career statistics ==
As of match played 16 March 2019

Appearances and goals by club, season and competition
Club	Season	League			National Cup		League Cup		Other		Total	
Club	Season	Division	Apps	Goals	Apps	Goals	Apps	Goals	Apps	Goals	Apps	Goals
Middlesbrough	2016–17	Premier League	0	0	0	0	0	0	—		0	0
Middlesbrough U-23s	2016–17	Premier League 2, Div 2	—		—		—		3 (Note: Appearances in the EFL Trophy)	0	3	0
Inverness Caledonian Thistle (loan)	2017–18	Scottish Championship	3	0	0	0	4	0	1 (Note: Appearance in the Scottish Challenge Cup)	0	8	0
Barrow	2018–19	National League	5	0	0	0	0	0	0	0	5	0
Career total			8	0	0	0	4	0	4	0	16	0
