= Joe Chalmers =

Scottish footballer (born 1994)

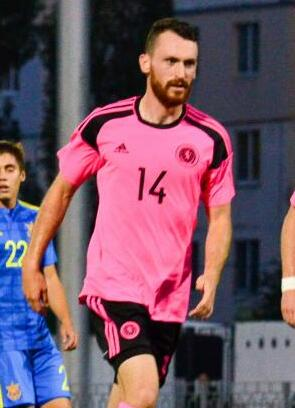

Personal information
- Full name: Joseph Chalmers
- Date of birth: 3 January 1994 (age 32)
- Place of birth: Glasgow, Scotland
- Height: 1.88 m (6 ft 2 in)
- Positions: Left-back; midfielder

Team information
- Current team: Cove Rangers (on loan from Inverness Caledonian Thistle)
- Number: 14

Youth career
- 2004–2013: Celtic

Senior career*
Years	Team	Apps	(Gls)
2012–2015	Celtic	2	(0)
2014	→ Falkirk (loan)	11	(0)
2015–2017	Motherwell	25	(0)
2017–2019	Inverness Caledonian Thistle	70	(4)
2019–2020	Ross County	14	(3)
2020–2022	Ayr United	40	(1)
2022–2025	Dunfermline Athletic	98	(0)
2025–2026	Inverness Caledonian Thistle	28	(0)
2026–	→ Cove Rangers (loan)	1	(0)

International career^{‡}
2009–2010	Scotland U16	6	(1)
2010–2011	Scotland U17	15	(1)
2012–2013	Scotland U19	6	(2)
2012	Scotland U20	1	(0)
2014–2016	Scotland U21	2	(0)
- * Club domestic league appearances and goals as of 01:59, 27 August 2026 (UTC) ‡ National team caps and goals as of 19:32, 10 September 2016 (UTC)

Joseph Chalmers (born 3 January 1994) is a Scottish footballer who plays as a left-back or midfielder for Scottish League One side, Cove Rangers, on loan from Scottish Championship side, Inverness Caledonian Thistle.

He has previously played for Celtic, Falkirk, Motherwell, Ross County, Ayr United, and Dunfermline Athletic.

== Career ==
=== Celtic ===
Raised in Cambuslang and a pupil at Trinity High School, Rutherglen, Chalmers joined Celtic at the age of 10 and went on to progress through the youth ranks at the club's academy. Along with four other youngsters, he signed his first professional contract in December 2011. A member of the club's under-20 side, on 25 August 2012, he made his senior debut for Celtic, coming on as a 76th-minute substitute in a Scottish Premier League match against Inverness Caledonian Thistle, replacing Emilio Izaguirre.

On 31 January 2014, Chalmers signed for Falkirk on loan until the end of the 2013–14 season. He made his Falkirk debut at left-back in a 2–0 defeat to Queen of the South at Palmerston Park on 8 February 2014. In his spell at Falkirk, he made a total of 11 appearances. He was injured for the Bairns' Scottish Premiership play-off campaign, meaning his last appearance came in a 3–1 home win against Alloa on 3 May 2014. Afterwards, he returned to Celtic.

After his return, Chalmers was given another chance under the new manager, Ronny Deila. However, multiple injuries such as persistent groin and hip problems reduced his playing time much further. At the end of the 2014–15 season, Chalmers was released by the club.

=== Motherwell ===
On 4 June 2015, Chalmers signed for Scottish Premiership club Motherwell on a two-year contract. Upon signing for the club, he said the move might not have happened had Motherwell lost to Rangers in the play-offs. He made his debut on 1 August 2015, in a 1–0 win against Inverness Caledonian Thistle. He was released by the club in May 2017, at the end of his contract.

=== Inverness Caledonian Thistle ===
On 13 July 2017, Chalmers signed a two-year contract for Scottish Championship club Inverness Caledonian Thistle. He scored his first career goal versus Queen of the South in a 3–1 win, in which the ball rolled over the line after being deflected around the box by the defenders.

=== Ayr United ===
In September 2020, Chalmers joined Ayr United on a two-year deal.

=== Dunfermline Athletic ===
On 24 January 2022, Chalmers joined Dunfermline Athletic for an undisclosed fee on an 18-month contract. After 125 club appearances over 2 and a half seasons, Chalmers departed the Pars in May 2025 following the end of his contract.

== International career ==
Chalmers represented Scotland at under-16, under-17, under-19, under-20 and under-21 levels.

== Career statistics ==
As of match played 9 May 2023

Appearances and goals by club, season and competition
Club	Season	League			Cup		League Cup		Other		Total	
Club	Season	Division	Apps	Goals	Apps	Goals	Apps	Goals	Apps	Goals	Apps	Goals
Celtic	2012–13	Scottish Premier League	2	0	1	0	0	0	0	0	3	0
Celtic	2013–14	Scottish Premiership	0	0	0	0	0	0	0	0	0	0
Celtic	2014–15	Scottish Premiership	0	0	0	0	0	0	0	0	0	0
Celtic	Celtic Total		2	0	1	0	0	0	0	0	3	0
Falkirk (loan)	2013–14	Scottish Championship	11	0	0	0	0	0	0	0	11	0
Motherwell	2015–16	Scottish Premiership	17	0	0	0	2	0	0	0	19	0
Motherwell	2016–17	Scottish Premiership	8	0	1	0	4	0	0	0	13	0
Motherwell	Motherwell Total		25	0	1	0	6	0	0	0	32	0
Inverness Caledonian Thistle	2017–18	Scottish Championship	34	4	2	0	4	0	5 (Note: Appearances in the Scottish Challenge Cup)	1	45	5
Inverness Caledonian Thistle	2018–19	Scottish Championship	36	0	7	1	4	0	4 (Note: appearances in the Premiership play-offs)	0	51	1
Inverness Caledonian Thistle	Inverness Total		70	4	9	1	8	0	9	1	96	6
Ross County	2019–20	Scottish Premiership	14	3	0	0	5	0	0	0	19	3
Ayr United	2020–21	Scottish Championship	24	0	2	1	5	0	0	0	31	1
Ayr United	2021–22	Scottish Championship	16	1	0	0	2	0	1	1	19	2
Ayr United	Ayr United Total		40	1	2	1	7	0	1	1	50	3
Dunfermline Athletic	2021-22	Scottish Championship	16	0	0	0	0	0	0	0	16	0
Dunfermline Athletic	2022-23	Scottish League One	34	0	3	0	4	0	2	0	43	0
Dunfermline Athletic	Dunfermline Total		50	0	3	0	4	0	2	0	60	0
Career total			212	8	16	2	30	0	12	2	270	12

== Honours ==
Celtic

- Scottish Premier League: 2012–13

Inverness CT

- Scottish Challenge Cup: 2017–18

Dunfermline Athletic

- Scottish League One: 2022–23
