= Nathan Austin =

British footballer

Personal information
- Date of birth: 15 February 1994 (age 32)
- Place of birth: Hertfordshire, England
- Position: Striker

Team information
- Current team: East Fife
- Number: 9

Youth career
- East Wemyss District U15
- –2013: Leven United

Senior career*
Years	Team	Apps	(Gls)
2013–2016	East Fife	72	(28)
2016–2017	Falkirk	31	(7)
2016	→ East Fife (loan)	15	(8)
2018–2019	Inverness Caledonian Thistle	35	(10)
2019–2023	Kelty Hearts	34	(49)
2021	→ East Fife (loan)	3	(1)
2023–	East Fife	78	(30)
- * Club domestic league appearances and goals as of 4 May 2026

Nathan Austin (born 15 February 1994), nicknamed Fash, is an English professional footballer, who plays as a striker for Scottish League One club East Fife. He has also previously played for Falkirk, Inverness Caledonian Thistle and Kelty Hearts.

== Career ==
Austin, born in Hertfordshire, England moved to Scotland with his family in 2001 at the age of seven. Whilst playing for youth side East Wemyss District under-15s, Austin came to the attention of the media after being subjected to racist abuse during matches for the side. Initially it was reported that he was to quit football because of the abuse, however he vowed to persevere after receiving support from the public and then-Scottish FA chief executive Gordon Smith. Eventually Austin signed for amateur side Leven United, before moving on to Scottish League One side East Fife in July 2013.

Austin made his debut for the Methil club in the Scottish Challenge Cup against Forfar Athletic, coming on as an 85th minute substitute for Scott McBride and his first goal for the side came in a 1–0 defeat of Arbroath in January 2014. His second season with the club saw him improve on the five goals he scored in his debut season, with the striker netting 14 times in competitive 38 matches, including a hat-trick against Threave Rovers in the Scottish Cup and four in the league against Elgin City in a 3–5 victory. His third season with East Fife started even more brightly, and by January 2016 Austin had scored 16 goals in 25 appearances, adding two further hat-tricks to his score-sheet against both Montrose and Stirling Albion. His performances attracted the attention of a number of top-tier sides, with Motherwell, Aberdeen and Dundee all reported as targeting Austin for a potential move. Austin was eventually signed by Scottish Championship side Falkirk on 15 January 2016, with the player remaining at Bayview Stadium on loan for the remainder of the season as part of the deal.

Austin continued to lead the line prolifically for the Fifers in the second half of the season; he scored one goal and assisted another the day after his transfer to Falkirk in a 4–2 win away to Annan Athletic, and also scored the following week in a 3–1 away victory at East Stirling. East Fife were to go on a great run of form towards the business end of the season, and eventually finished top of League Two, ensuring promotion to League One and giving Austin a league winners medal.

Austin spent just under two years with Falkirk, before being released from his contract in December 2017. He then signed for Inverness Caledonian Thistle, and made his debut in a 1–1 draw against Livingston on 2 January 2018. He scored his first hat-trick for the club on 14 April 2018, in 5–1 win against Dumbarton.

In May 2019, Austin signed for Lowland League side Kelty Hearts. He was loaned to East Fife in March 2021.

However three years on Austin has now returned home to East Fife from Kelty Hearts and signed a two-year contract in June 2023.

== Personal life ==
Austin's younger brother Jordan was also a footballer and played alongside him at East Fife in Nathan's first spell at the club.

== Career statistics ==
As of 28 September 2020

Appearances and goals by club, season and competition
Club	Season	League			Scottish Cup		League Cup		Other		Total	
Club	Season	Division	Apps	Goals	Apps	Goals	Apps	Goals	Apps	Goals	Apps	Goals
East Fife	2013–14	Scottish League One	22	4	1	0	1	0	5 (Note: One appearance in the Scottish Challenge Cup; four appearances and one goal in the League One play-offs)	1	29	5
East Fife	2014–15	Scottish League Two	30	10	2	3	1	0	5 (Note: Three appearances and one goal in the Scottish Challenge Cup; two appearances in the League One play-offs)	1	38	14
East Fife	2015–16	Scottish League Two	20	14	2	0	2	2	1 (Note: Appearances in the Scottish Challenge Cup)	0	25	16
East Fife	East Fife Total		72	28	5	3	4	2	11	2	92	35
Falkirk	2015–16	Scottish Championship	0	0	0	0	0	0	0	0	0	0
Falkirk	2016–17	Scottish Championship	17	6	0	0	4	1	2 (Note: Appearances in the Premiership play-offs)	0	23	7
Falkirk	2017–18	Scottish Championship	14	1	0	0	4	3	3	1	21	5
Falkirk	Falkirk Total		31	7	0	0	8	4	5	1	44	13
East Fife (loan)	2015–16	Scottish League Two	15	8	0	0	0	0	0	0	15	8
Inverness Caledonian Thistle	2017–18	Scottish Championship	27	7	0	0	4	3	3	1	34	11
Inverness Caledonian Thistle	2018–19	Scottish Championship	23	4	6	0	4	3	2	0	35	7
Inverness Caledonian Thistle	Inverness Total		50	11	6	0	8	6	5	1	69	18
Kelty Hearts	2019–20	Lowland League	25	37	1	0	0	0	0	0	25	37
Career total			178	83	12	3	20	12	21	4	231	103

== Honours ==
=== Club ===
East Fife

- Scottish League Two: 2015–16

Kelty Hearts

- Lowland League: 2019–20, 2020–21
- Scottish League Two: 2021–22

=== Individual ===
- PFA Scotland Team of the Year League Two: 2015–16
- PFA Scotland Team of the Year League Two: 2021–22
- Lowland League Top Goalscorer: 2019–20
