= George Oakley (footballer) =

English footballer (born 1995)

Personal information
- Full name: George Oakley
- Date of birth: 18 November 1995 (age 30)
- Place of birth: Tooting, England
- Height: 1.87 m (6 ft 1 1/2 in)
- Position: Striker

Team information
- Current team: Raith Rovers
- Number: 9

Youth career
- 2007–2014: AFC Wimbledon

Senior career*
Years	Team	Apps	(Gls)
2014–2017	AFC Wimbledon	9	(0)
2015	→ Kingstonian (loan)	1	(1)
2016	→ Welling United (loan)	7	(4)
2017	→ Maidstone United (loan)	4	(0)
2017–2019	Inverness Caledonian Thistle	46	(12)
2019–2020	Hamilton Academical	36	(8)
2020	Pirin Blagoevgrad	10	(0)
2021	Kilmarnock	7	(1)
2021–2022	Woking	17	(1)
2022–2023	Inverness Caledonian Thistle	18	(1)
2023–2024	Greenock Morton	38	(15)
2024–2026	Ayr United	49	(13)
2026–	Raith Rovers	8	(3)
- * Club domestic league appearances and goals as of 17:47, 24 October 2026 (UTC)

George Oakley (born 18 November 1995) is an English professional footballer who plays as a striker for Scottish Championship club Raith Rovers.

== Playing career ==
=== AFC Wimbledon ===
Oakley joined AFC Wimbledon at the age of eleven, and progressed through the youth ranks. On 15 February 2014, he was named as a substitute in a 1–0 league defeat at Portsmouth. He signed a professional contract in May 2014, and scored just days later in the 2014 London Senior Cup final win over Metropolitan Police.

Oakley was ruled out of the opening two months of the 2014–15 season with a hamstring injury. On 7 October 2014, he marked his return in a 4–0 defeat to Charlton Athletic in the U21 Premier League Cup. On 1 November 2014, he made his Football League debut as a late substitute in a 2–0 loss at Northampton Town.

On 30 October 2015, Oakley joined affiliate Isthmian Premier Division side Kingstonian on a one-month loan. He made his debut the following day, scoring in a 5–1 FA Trophy win at Leatherhead. He managed just 12 minutes in his second appearance – a 1–0 victory over Enfield Town – before suffering from injury. A grade two hamstring tear ruled him out for eight weeks and his loan spell was ended prematurely.

In January 2016, Oakley suffered a broken ankle during a training session, ruling him out for the remainder of the 2015–16 season. On 19 July 2016, he made his first appearance after the injury in a pre-season outing at Raynes Park Vale. On 8 November 2016, he made his first appearance of the season for the senior squad in a 2–0 EFL Trophy defeat at Newport County.

On 18 November 2016, Now plays for woking his 21st birthday, Oakley joined National League South club Welling United on a one-month loan. Making his debut in a 3–1 defeat at Hampton & Richmond Borough, he scored his first goal for the club a week later in a 1–0 FA Trophy win at Concord Rangers. He added his second of the season in the next round of the cup, completing the scoring in an 8–1 win over Hythe Town. On 16 December 2016, Oakley's loan at Welling was extended by a further month.

On 17 March 2017, Oakley joined National League side Maidstone United on a one-month loan deal.

=== Inverness Caledonian Thistle ===
Oakley signed for Scottish Championship club Inverness Caledonian Thistle in July 2017. He scored his first goal for the club in a 4–1 friendly win at Brora Rangers. He then scored his first competitive goal in Inverness's first game of the season, the opening game of the Scottish League Cup group stages, a 3–0 home win against Brechin City. He started in the following match, a 0–0 draw away at Stirling Albion which resulted in a 2–0 penalty shootout a win for ICT, the lowest scoring penalty shootout in Scottish football. His second competitive goal for Inverness came in a 2–1 win away to Forfar Athletic, although this wasn't enough to prevent them exiting the League Cup.

On 30 December 2017, with Inverness down to ten men and losing 2–1 against bottom of the table Brechin City, Oakley came on as a substitute and netted twice to give Inverness the win. On his Scottish Cup debut, he scored a late goal in a 2–2 draw v Dundee, earning Inverness a replay at home.

=== Hamilton Academical ===
In January 2019, Oakley moved to Hamilton Academical. On 27 February 2019, he scored the opening goal as Hamilton won 2–0 away to Aberdeen, with the goal drawing comparisons to Marco van Basten.

=== Pirin Blagoevgrad ===
In June 2020, he signed a two-year contract with Bulgarian club Pirin Blagoevgrad. In January 2021, he was training with Kilmarnock after leaving Pirin.

=== Kilmarnock ===
On 26 January 2021, after a trial period, Oakley returned to the Scottish Premiership with Kilmarnock after signing a deal until the end of the season. He left Kilmarnock at the end of the 2020–21 season.

=== Woking ===
On 22 June 2021, it was announced that Oakley would join National League side, Woking following his release from Kilmarnock. He went on to feature seventeen times, scoring once before leaving The Cards in July 2022 at the end of his contract.

=== Return to Inverness Caledonian Thistle ===
On 2 July 2022, Oakley returned to Inverness Caledonian Thistle, 3 years after leaving initially. A week later, Oakley scored on his second debut in a 1–0 away win over Kelty Hearts in the League Cup. On 20 January 2023, Oakley left Caley by mutual consent.

=== Greenock Morton ===
On 24 January 2023, Oakley signed an 18-month contract with Scottish Championship club Greenock Morton. He scored his first Morton goal 4 minutes into his debut. Oakley would finish the season with 6 goals in 13 appearances, an average of roughly 1 goal every 2 games.

=== Ayr United ===
In 2024, Oakley joined Scottish Championship club Ayr United on a two-year deal after previously signing a pre-contract agreement while at Morton.

=== Raith Rovers ===
On 4 May 2026, Oakley agreed to join fellow Scottish Championship club Raith Rovers on a two-year deal from the expiry of his contract with Ayr United.

== Career statistics ==
As of 24 January 2023

Appearances and goals by club, season and competition
Club	Season	League			National cup (Note: Includes FA Cup, Scottish Cup, Bulgarian Cup)		League cup (Note: Includes Scottish League Cup)		Other		Total	
Club	Season	Division	Apps	Goals	Apps	Goals	Apps	Goals	Apps	Goals	Apps	Goals
AFC Wimbledon	2014–15	League Two	6	0	1	0	0	0	0	0	7	0
AFC Wimbledon	2015–16	League Two	1	0	0	0	0	0	0	0	1	0
AFC Wimbledon	2016–17	League One	2	0	0	0	0	0	1 (Note: Appearance in EFL Trophy)	0	3	0
AFC Wimbledon	Total		9	0	1	0	0	0	1	0	11	0
Kingstonian (loan)	2015–16	Isthmian League Premier Division	1	0	0	0	—		1 (Note: Appearance in FA Trophy)	1	2	1
Welling United (loan)	2016–17	National League South	6	1	0	0	—		3 (Note: Two appearances and two goals in FA Trophy, one appearance in Kent Senior Cup)	2	9	3
Maidstone United (loan)	2016–17	National League	4	0	0	0	—		—		4	0
Inverness Caledonian Thistle	2017–18	Scottish Championship	33	8	2	1	4	2	5 (Note: Appearances in Scottish Challenge Cup)	1	44	12
Inverness Caledonian Thistle	2018–19	Scottish Championship	13	4	2	0	3	1	1	0	19	5
Inverness Caledonian Thistle	Total		46	12	4	1	7	3	6	1	63	17
Hamilton Academical	2018–19	Scottish Premiership	15	4	—		—		—		15	4
Hamilton Academical	2019–20	Scottish Premiership	21	4	1	0	5	0	—		27	4
Hamilton Academical	Total		36	8	1	0	5	0	—		42	8
Pirin Blagoevgrad	2020–21	Bulgarian Second League	10	0	1	0	—		—		11	0
Kilmarnock	2020–21	Scottish Premiership	6	0	3	1	0	0	—		9	1
Woking	2021–22	National League	17	1	0	0	—		—		17	1
Inverness Caledonian Thistle	2022–23	Scottish Championship	18	1	1	0	3	1	1	2	23	4
Greenock Morton	2022–23	Scottish Championship	0	0	—		—		0	0	0	0
Career total			153	23	11	2	15	4	12	6	191	35

== Honours ==
Inverness Caledonian Thistle

- Scottish Challenge Cup: 2017–18
