= David Raven (footballer) =

English footballer (born 1985)

Personal information
- Full name: David Haydn Raven
- Date of birth: 10 March 1985 (age 41)
- Place of birth: West Kirby, Wirral, England
- Height: 1.83 m (6 ft 0 in)
- Position: Right-back

Youth career
- Tranmere Rovers

Senior career*
Years	Team	Apps	(Gls)
2004–2006	Liverpool	1	(0)
2005–2006	→ Tranmere Rovers (loan)	11	(0)
2006–2010	Carlisle United	137	(1)
2010–2011	Shrewsbury Town	24	(0)
2011–2012	Tranmere Rovers	17	(0)
2012–2018	Inverness Caledonian Thistle	153	(3)
2018	Wrexham	7	(0)
2018–2020	Warrington Town	59	(3)
2020–2021	Marine	16	(0)
Total		425	(7)

International career^{‡}
	England U18	5	(0)
	England U19	5	(0)
	England U20	3	(0)
- * Club domestic league appearances and goals as of 19:36, 11th December 2021 (UTC) ‡ National team caps and goals as of 14 September 2014

David Haydn Raven (born 10 March 1985) is an English former footballer and former assistant manager at Warrington Town. He played as a right-back or centre-back.

== Career ==
=== Liverpool ===
He initially started playing in Tranmere Rovers' academy while attending Calday Grange Grammar School before joining Liverpool.

Raven made his first team debut with a man-of-the-match display during the League Cup quarter-final win against Tottenham Hotspur at White Hart Lane in December 2004 and went on to play in two further games: disappointing defeats to Burnley in the FA Cup Third Round and Southampton in the Barclays Premiership. He had also played in the pre-season match against Wrexham in August 2004.

He featured in a number of games at centre-half for the reserves throughout 2004 but manager Rafael Benítez, having been impressed since his arrival in the summer, saw his best position as right-back. He became the regular captain of Liverpool's reserve team. Raven spent the latter part of the 2005–06 season on loan at Tranmere Rovers.

=== Carlisle United ===
Raven then moved to Carlisle United from Liverpool on a free transfer but his debut lasted only half-an-hour before he was substituted because of injury.

After an injury-plagued first season at Carlisle, 2007–08 was a different story for Raven, as he established himself as Carlisle's first choice right-back. He also won the club's 'Most Improved Player of the Year' award. During this season he also scored his first goal for Carlisle when he netted against Orient.

Raven signed for Shrewsbury Town in July 2010 on a one-year contract.

=== Shrewsbury Town ===
Having been released from Carlisle United, new Shrewsbury Town manager Graham Turner announced Raven as his second permanent signing. After another injury plagued, yet consistent season when playing, Raven was released by the club in May 2011.

=== Tranmere Rovers ===
In the summer of 2011, he returned to former 'loan' club Tranmere Rovers on trial, playing in a pre-season tie against Colwyn Bay. He signed for the club but was subsequently released at the end of the 2011–12 season after making 17 league appearances.

=== Inverness Caledonian Thistle ===
He signed for SPL side Inverness Caledonian Thistle in June 2012. He made his debut in a 2–1 friendly win over Buckie Thistle. His SPL debut came against St Mirren in a 2–2 draw.

Raven scored his first goal for ICT when he opened the scoring in a 3–0 Highland derby win against Ross County in February 2014. His third career goal was an extra-time winner against Celtic, in the 2014–15 Scottish Cup semi-final at Hampden Park, Glasgow, on Sunday 19 April 2015. On 30 April Inverness CT announced that Raven had signed a one-year contract extension, keeping him at the club until the end of the 2015–16 season. Inverness won the 2014–15 Scottish Cup, but Raven missed the cup final due to injury.

Just before December 2017, David Raven confirmed that he would be leaving the club for greener pastures, due to the fact of the club being in debt and being unable to afford several high earning players' wages. Raven was one on the list that they couldn't afford. He also admitted that he wanted to start coaching with the highland club.

On 2 January 2018, Raven played his final home game for Inverness in a 1–1 draw with Livingston in the 2017–18 Scottish Championship. His final game for Caley Thistle came four days later in a 1–0 loss to St Mirren.

=== Wrexham ===
On 26 January 2018, Raven joined Wrexham and made his debut the following day in a 2–2 draw against former club Tranmere Rovers and alongside former Inverness teammate Scott Boden. Raven was released by Wrexham in May 2018.

=== Warrington Town and Marine ===
On 1 July 2018, Raven joined Northern Premier League side, Warrington Town, after almost 2 months without a club. He made two appearances for the club in the FA Cup against FC Halifax Town in the initial 2–2 draw on 20 October 2018, and the 2–0 loss in the replay three days later.

In September 2020 he joined Marine. He left in December 2021 to become assistant manager at Warrington Town. On 5 August 2024, Raven announced he had been "sacked" from his role at the club.

== Career statistics ==
As of match played 29 November 2020

Appearances and goals by club, season and competition
Club	Season	League			National Cup		League Cup		Europe		Other		Total	
Club	Season	Division	Apps	Goals	Apps	Goals	Apps	Goals	Apps	Goals	Apps	Goals	Apps	Goals
Liverpool	2004–05	Premier League	1	0	1	0	1	0	0	0	0	0	3	0
Liverpool	2005–06	Premier League	0	0	0	0	1	0	0	0	0	0	1	0
Liverpool	Liverpool total		1	0	1	0	2	0	0	0	0	0	4	0
Tranmere Rovers (loan)	2005–06	League One	11	0	—		—		—		0	0	11	0
Carlisle United	2006–07	League One	36	0	1	0	0	0	—		0	0	37	0
Carlisle United	2007–08	League One	44	1	2	0	2	0	—		2 (Note: Appearances in the Football League Trophy)	0	50	1
Carlisle United	2008–09	League One	41	0	3	0	2	0	—		0	0	46	0
Carlisle United	2009–10	League One	16	0	0	0	3	0	—		2	0	21	0
Carlisle United	Carlisle total		137	1	6	0	7	0	—		4	0	154	1
Shrewsbury Town	2010–11	League Two	24	0	0	0	2	0	—		2	0	28	0
Tranmere Rovers	2011–12	League One	17	0	1	0	1	0	—		1	0	20	0
Inverness Caledonian Thistle	2012–13	Scottish Premier League	36	0	3	0	4	0	—		—		43	0
Inverness Caledonian Thistle	2013–14	Scottish Premiership	26	1	3	0	3	0	—		—		32	1
Inverness Caledonian Thistle	2014–15	Scottish Premiership	33	0	5	1	1	0	—		—		39	1
Inverness Caledonian Thistle	2015–16	Scottish Premiership	19	1	3	0	2	0	2 (Note: Appearances in the Europa League)	0	—		26	1
Inverness Caledonian Thistle	2016–17	Scottish Premiership	21	1	1	0	4	0	—		—		26	1
Inverness Caledonian Thistle	2017–18	Scottish Championship	18	0	0	0	1	0	—		3 (Note: Appearances in the Scottish Challenge Cup)	1	22	1
Inverness Caledonian Thistle	Inverness total		153	3	15	1	15	0	2	0	3	1	188	5
Wrexham	2017–18	National League	7	0	—		—		—		0	0	7	0
Warrington Town	2018–19	Northern Premier League	37	0	6	0	—		—		1 (Note: Appearances in the FA Trophy)	0	44	0
Warrington Town	2019–20	Northern Premier League	22	3	4	0	—		—		1	0	27	3
Warrington Town	Warrington total		59	3	10	0	—		—		2	0	71	3
Marine	2020–21	Northern Premier League Division One North West	4	0	6	1	—		—		3	0	13	1
Career total			413	7	39	2	27	0	2	0	15	1	496	10
