= Coll Donaldson =

Scottish footballer (born 1995)

Personal information
- Full name: Coll Ian Donaldson
- Date of birth: 9 April 1995 (age 31)
- Place of birth: North Berwick, East Lothian, Scotland
- Height: 6 ft 2 in (1.88 m)
- Position: Centre-back

Team information
- Current team: Falkirk
- Number: 6

Youth career
- Tynecastle
- 2011–2013: Livingston

Senior career*
Years	Team	Apps	(Gls)
2013–2014	Livingston	24	(1)
2014–2015	Queens Park Rangers	1	(0)
2015–2017	Dundee United	32	(0)
2017–2020	Inverness Caledonian Thistle	76	(3)
2020–2022	Ross County	37	(1)
2022	→ Dunfermline Athletic (loan)	16	(2)
2022–	Falkirk	97	(4)
- * Club domestic league appearances and goals as of 20 May 2026

Coll Donaldson (born 9 April 1995) is a Scottish professional footballer who plays as a centre-back for Scottish Premiership club Falkirk, where he is also club captain.

He has previously played for Livingston, Queens Park Rangers, Dundee United, Inverness Caledonian Thistle, Ross County and Dunfermline Athletic.

== Club career ==
Donaldson grew up in North Berwick, East Lothian, and attended North Berwick High School, joining Livingston's youth ranks in 2011 from Tynecastle. After progressing through the club's youth system and impressing for the reserve team, he signed a new two-year contract for Livingston on 17 January 2013. Later that month he went on trial with Premier League club Manchester United. He made his first-team debut for Livingston as a late substitute against Dunfermline Athletic on 30 March 2013. He then went on to make a further four appearances towards the end of season 2012–13. In December 2013, Donaldson was allowed to travel to Queens Park Rangers for a trial. In January 2014, Donaldson completed his move to Queens Park Rangers, for a fee of around £150,000. In all he made 29 appearances in all competitions, scoring once.

On 28 January 2014, aged 19 Donaldson joined Queens Park Rangers from Livingston after impressing QPR manager Harry Redknapp during a week-long trial. Donaldson made his senior and Championship debut on 3 May 2014 in a 3–2 away win against Barnsley at Oakwell, where he was named in the starting line up and played the full 90 minutes.

On 13 July 2015, Donaldson joined Scottish Premiership side Dundee United on a three-year contract following his release from QPR. Donaldson was released on 7 August 2017, after two seasons with the club.

Later that month, he signed a short-term contract with Inverness Caledonian Thistle. In December 2017, he extended his Inverness contract for a further two and a half years.

Donaldson moved to Ross County in January 2020 for an undisclosed transfer fee. He made his debut in a 1–0 defeat to Ayr United in the Scottish Cup.

In January 2022, Donaldson reunited with former boss John Hughes after joining Dunfermline Athletic on loan for the rest of the season.

Donaldson signed a two-year contract with Falkirk in May 2022. He was appointed club captain in January 2024.

== Career statistics ==
As of 2 May 2025

Appearances and goals by club, season and competition
Club	Season	League			Scottish Cup		League Cup		Other		Total	
Club	Season	Division	Apps	Goals	Apps	Goals	Apps	Goals	Apps	Goals	Apps	Goals
Livingston	2012–13	Scottish First Division	5	0	0	0	0	0	0	0	5	0
Livingston	2013–14	Scottish Championship	19	1	1	0	3	0	1 (Note: Appearances in the Scottish Challenge Cup)	0	24	1
Livingston	Total		24	1	1	0	3	0	1	0	29	1
Queens Park Rangers	2013–14	Championship	1	0	0	0	0	0	0	0	1	0
Queens Park Rangers	2014–15	Premier League	0	0	0	0	0	0	—		0	0
Queens Park Rangers	Total		1	0	0	0	0	0	0	0	1	0
Dundee United	2015–16	Scottish Premiership	18	0	4	0	0	0	—		22	0
Dundee United	2016–17	Scottish Championship	14	0	0	0	5	0	3	0	22	0
Dundee United	Total		32	0	4	0	5	0	3	0	44	0
Inverness Caledonian Thistle	2017–18	Scottish Championship	26	1	2	0	0	0	5	0	33	1
Inverness Caledonian Thistle	2018–19	Scottish Championship	30	1	0	0	4	0	0	0	34	1
Inverness Caledonian Thistle	2019–20	Scottish Championship	20	1	0	0	4	1	3	0	27	2
Inverness Caledonian Thistle	Total		76	3	2	0	8	1	8	0	94	4
Ross County	2019–20	Scottish Premiership	7	0	1	0	0	0	—		8	0
Ross County	2020–21	Scottish Premiership	28	1	1	0	5	0	—		34	1
Ross County	2021–22	Scottish Premiership	2	0	0	0	2	0	—		4	0
Ross County	Total		37	1	2	0	7	0	0	0	46	1
Dunfermline Athletic (loan)	2021–22	Scottish Championship	16	2	0	0	0	0	2 (Note: Appearances in Scottish Championship play-offs)	0	18	2
Falkirk	2022–23	Scottish League One	33	1	4	1	2	0	4 (Note: Two Appearances in Scottish Challenge Cup, two appearances and one goal in Scottish League One play-offs)	1	43	3
Falkirk	2023–24	Scottish League One	34	3	2	0	4	0	4	0	44	3
Falkirk	2024–25	Scottish Championship	20	0	3	0	1	0	1	0	25	0
Falkirk	Total		87	4	9	1	8	0	9	1	112	6
Career total			273	10	23	1	31	1	27	2	353	14

== Honours ==
Dundee United

- Scottish Challenge Cup: 2016–17

Falkirk

- Scottish Championship: 2024–25
- Scottish League One: 2023–24

Individual

- PFA Scotland Team of the Year: 2023–24 Scottish League One
