= Liam Polworth =

Scottish footballer (born 1994)

Personal information
- Date of birth: 12 October 1994 (age 32)
- Place of birth: Inverness, Scotland
- Position: Midfielder

Team information
- Current team: Kilmarnock
- Number: 31

Senior career*
Years	Team	Apps	(Gls)
2011–2019	Inverness Caledonian Thistle	166	(15)
2019–2021	Motherwell	51	(1)
2021–	Kilmarnock	123	(5)
2022	→ Dunfermline Athletic (loan)	9	(0)

International career
2009–2010	Scotland U16	6	(1)
2010–2011	Scotland U17	13	(0)
2016	Scotland U21	1	(0)
- * Club domestic league appearances and goals as of 16:53, 2 May 2026 (UTC)

Liam Polworth (born 12 October 1994) is a Scottish professional footballer who plays as a midfielder for Scottish Premiership club Kilmarnock. He has previously played for Inverness Caledonian Thistle, Motherwell and Dunfermline Athletic.

== Early and personal life ==
Polworth was born in Inverness. His father Iain also played for Inverness.

== Club career ==
=== Inverness Caledonian Thistle ===
Polworth made his senior debut for Inverness Caledonian Thistle in the Scottish Premier League on 11 May 2011, becoming the club's youngest ever player, at the age of 16 years, 211 days. Polworth was an unused substitute as Inverness won the 2015 Scottish Cup Final. Polworth established himself in the first team during the 2015–16 season, scoring five goals from a midfield position. He signed a new three-year contract with Inverness in April 2016.

On 24 March 2018, Polworth started the whole game in the Scottish Challenge Cup final against Dumbarton and helped Inverness Caledonian Thistle win 1–0 to win a trophy.

For his performance in the 2018–19 season, Polworth, alongside Aaron Doran, were named PFA Scotland Scottish Championship Team of the Year.

=== Motherwell ===
On 17 April 2019, Polworth signed a pre-contract agreement with Motherwell, his first club after being at Inverness since the age of 8.

After rejecting a new contract in January 2021 and falling out with manager Graham Alexander, Polworth was made to train with the youth team.

On 24 May 2021, Motherwell announced that Polworth would be leaving the club at the end of the season when his contract expired.

=== Kilmarnock ===
He signed for Kilmarnock on 23 June 2021. On 28 February 2022, Polworth joined Scottish Championship side Dunfermline Athletic on loan for the remainder of the 2021–22 season.

== International career ==
Polworth has represented Scotland at under-16 and under-17 youth levels. He made his debut appearance for the under-21 team during the 2015–16 season.

== Career statistics ==
As of 2 May 2026

Appearances and goals by club, season and competition
Club	Season	League			Scottish Cup		League Cup		Other		Total	
Club	Season	Division	Apps	Goals	Apps	Goals	Apps	Goals	Apps	Goals	Apps	Goals
Inverness Caledonian Thistle	2010–11	Premier League	1	0	0	0	0	0	—		1	0
Inverness Caledonian Thistle	2011–12	Premier League	0	0	0	0	0	0	—		0	0
Inverness Caledonian Thistle	2012–13	Premier League	3	0	0	0	0	0	—		3	0
Inverness Caledonian Thistle	2013–14	Premiership	19	1	2	0	2	0	—		23	1
Inverness Caledonian Thistle	2014–15	Premiership	5	0	0	0	1	0	—		6	0
Inverness Caledonian Thistle	2015–16	Premiership	36	6	5	0	2	0	0	0	43	6
Inverness Caledonian Thistle	2016–17	Premiership	32	3	1	0	5	0	—		38	3
Inverness Caledonian Thistle	2017–18	Championship	35	3	2	0	4	0	5 (Note: Appearances in the Scottish Challenge Cup)	2	46	5
Inverness Caledonian Thistle	2018–19	Championship	35	2	7	1	4	0	4 (Note: One appearance in the Scottish Challenge Cup and three appearances in the Scottish Premiership play-offs)	0	50	3
Inverness Caledonian Thistle	Total		166	15	17	1	18	0	9	2	210	18
Motherwell	2019–20	Premiership	30	1	3	1	4	1	—		37	3
Motherwell	2020–21	Premiership	21	0	0	0	1	0	3 (Note: Appearance(s) in the 2020-21 Europa League.)	1	25	1
Motherwell	Total		51	1	3	1	5	1	3	1	62	2
Kilmarnock	2021–22	Championship	14	1	2	0	3	0	1	0	20	1
Kilmarnock	2022–23	Premiership	26	1	2	0	6	1	0	0	34	2
Kilmarnock	2023–24	Premiership	28	0	3	0	4	0	0	0	35	0
Kilmarnock	2024–25	Premiership	26	2	1	0	1	0	4 (Note: 2 appearances in the UEFA Europa League, 2 appearances in the UEFA Europa Conference League)	0	32	2
Kilmarnock	2025–26	Premiership	29	1	0	0	5	0	0	0	34	1
Kilmarnock	Total		123	5	8	0	19	1	5	0	155	6
Dunfermline Athletic (loan)	2021–22	Championship	9	0	0	0	0	0	2 (Note: Appearances in the play-offs.)	0	11	0
Career total			349	21	28	2	42	2	19	3	438	28

== Honours ==
Inverness CT

- Scottish Cup: 2014–15
- Scottish Challenge Cup: 2017–18

=== Individual awards ===
- PFA Scotland Team of the Year (Championship): 2018–19
