= Riccardo Calder =

English footballer

Personal information
- Full name: Riccardo Amos Calder
- Date of birth: 26 January 1996 (age 30)
- Place of birth: Birmingham, England
- Height: 1.83 m (6 ft 0 in)
- Positions: Defender; midfielder

Team information
- Current team: Tamworth
- Number: 16

Youth career
- 2005–2014: Aston Villa

Senior career*
Years	Team	Apps	(Gls)
2014–2017	Aston Villa	0	(0)
2015–2016	→ Dundee (loan)	11	(0)
2016	→ Doncaster Rovers (loan)	12	(0)
2016–2017	→ Doncaster Rovers (loan)	15	(0)
2017	→ Lincoln City (loan)	1	(0)
2017–2018	Inverness Caledonian Thistle	33	(1)
2019	Bradford (Park Avenue)	7	(1)
2019–2020	AFC Telford United	4	(0)
2020	Nuneaton Borough	7	(0)
2020	Rushall Olympic	8	(1)
2021–2022	Kettering Town	12	(0)
2022	Rushall Olympic	7	(0)
2022–2026	Brackley Town	141	(2)
2026–	Tamworth	4	(0)

International career^{‡}
2012	England U17	4	(0)
- * Club domestic league appearances and goals as of 22:00, 9 September 2026 (UTC) ‡ National team caps and goals as of 16:36, 23 October 2016 (UTC)

Riccardo Amos Calder (born 26 January 1996) is an English professional footballer who plays as a defender/midfielder for National League club Tamworth.

Calder is a product of the Aston Villa academy but did not break into their first team following loan spells at Dundee, Doncaster Rovers and Lincoln City. Calder represented England internationally at Under-17 level.

== Club career ==
=== Aston Villa ===
Calder joined Aston Villa at the age of nine in 2005. Calder was part of the Villa under-19's team which won the 2012–13 NextGen Series, beating Chelsea in the final of the competition. Calder never made a first team appearance.

==== Dundee (loan) ====
On 31 August 2015, the deadline day of the 2015 summer transfer window, Calder moved on loan to Dundee in the Scottish Premiership until January 2016. He made his debut for the club as a substitute in a 1–0 away win at Partick Thistle on 12 September 2015. Calder made his first start for Dundee against Ross County on 25 September, featuring on the left of midfield in a 3–3 draw. Calder started again against Motherwell on 3 October and assisted Rory Loy with a cross for the opening goal of the game in a 2–1 home win. Calder's loan spell ended at the beginning of January 2016, at which point he returned to Aston Villa.

==== Doncaster Rovers (loan) ====
On 3 March 2016 Calder moved to Doncaster Rovers on loan, making 12 appearances as Doncaster were relegated to League Two. On 12 July 2016, prior to the start of the 2016–17 season, Calder rejoined Doncaster on loan until January. He scored his first goal for Doncaster in an EFL Trophy tie against Mansfield Town on 30 August 2016. The loan was not extended and Calder returned to Villa.

==== Lincoln City (loan) ====
On 11 March 2017, Calder joined National League side Lincoln City on a one-month loan deal.

=== Inverness Caledonian Thistle ===
On 6 July 2017, Calder signed a two-year deal with recently relegated Scottish Championship club Inverness Caledonian Thistle.

On 8 November 2018, Calder had his contract terminated by the club after being found guilty of an assault in Birmingham in May 2018.

=== Bradford (Park Avenue) ===
On 23 August 2019, Calder signed for National League North side Bradford (Park Avenue).

=== AFC Telford United ===
On 3 October 2019, Calder joined fellow National League North side AFC Telford United on a contract until the end of the 2019–20 season.

=== Nuneaton Borough ===
On 21 January 2020, Calder joined Nuneaton Borough on a dual-registration basis.

=== Rushall Olympic ===
On 14 August 2020, Calder signed for Southern League Premier Division Central side Rushall Olympic.

=== Kettering Town ===
Calder then returned to National League North in order to sign for Kettering Town.

=== Return to Rushall Olympic ===
On 19 February 2022, Calder rejoined former club Rushall Olympic.

=== Brackley Town ===
On 11 July 2022, Calder returned to the National League North to join Brackley Town.

=== Tamworth ===
In June 2026, Calder joined National League club Tamworth. Calder made his debut for Tamworth on 18 August 2026, in a National League Cup fixture at home to Newcastle United. He assisted Jake Hutchinson to a 31st minute goal, as Tamworth won the fixture 5–3. Riccardo made his National League debut for Tamworth on 22 August 2026 in an away fixture against FC Halifax Town. He played the full match in a 4–1 defeat. Calder scored his first goal for Tamworth on 9 September 2026, in a National League Cup fixture at home to Middlesbrough, Riccardo scored on the 45th minute, however Tamworth went on to lose the fixture 3–1.

== International career ==
Calder has represented England at Under-17 level, playing at the 2012 Nordic Under-17 Football Championship in the Faroe Islands. He made four appearances including the final as England came runners-up to Sweden. Calder is also eligible for the Jamaica national football team through his family history.

== Conviction and imprisonment ==
In a November 2018 trial at Birmingham Magistrates' Court, Calder was found guilty of assault on a 24-year-old woman, what began with a minor car accident resulted in a repeated assault on the victim by Calder. As a result, his contract with Inverness Caledonian Thistle was immediately terminated. This came less than a week after he scored his first professional league goal. Calder was subsequently sentenced to nine months in prison. Calder was released after serving 10 weeks of the sentence and stated his hope to return to professional football.

== Personal life ==
Calder records music under the pseudonym Cardz and made a rap music video for the YouTube channel, Link Up TV, called "Gettin' It", as well as an album called Overtime which is available on streaming platforms Spotify and Deezer. In 2018 he claimed to have turned down recording contracts to focus on his professional football at Inverness.

== Career statistics ==
As of match played 9 September 2026

Appearances and goals by club, season and competition
Club	Season	League			National Cup		League Cup		Other		Total	
Club	Season	Division	Apps	Goals	Apps	Goals	Apps	Goals	Apps	Goals	Apps	Goals
Aston Villa	2015–16	Premier League	0	0	0	0	0	0	–		0	0
Aston Villa	2016–17	Championship	0	0	0	0	0	0	–		0	0
Aston Villa	Aston Villa Total		0	0	0	0	0	0	0	0	0	0
Dundee (loan)	2015–16	Scottish Premiership	11	0	0	0	0	0	—		11	0
Doncaster Rovers (loan)	2015–16	League One	12	0	0	0	0	0	0	0	12	0
Doncaster Rovers (loan)	2016–17	League Two	15	0	0	0	1	0	4 (Note: Appearances in the EFL Trophy)	1	20	1
Lincoln City (loan)	2016–17	National League	1	0	0	0	—		1 (Note: Appearances in the FA Trophy)	0	2	0
Inverness Caledonian Thistle	2017–18	Scottish Championship	24	0	2	0	4	0	4 (Note: Appearances in the Scottish Challenge Cup)	2	34	2
Inverness Caledonian Thistle	2018–19	Scottish Championship	9	1	0	0	2	0	1	0	12	1
Inverness Caledonian Thistle	Inverness Caledonian Thistle Total		33	1	2	0	6	0	5	2	46	3
Bradford (Park Avenue)	2019–20	National League North	7	1	0	0	—		0	0	7	1
AFC Telford United	2019–20	National League North	4	0	0	0	—		1	0	5	0
Nuneaton Borough	2020–21	Southern League Premier Division Central	7	0	0	0	—		0	0	7	0
Rushall Olympic	2020–21	Southern League Premier Division Central	8	1	0	0	—		0	0	8	1
Kettering Town	2021–22	National League North	12	0	0	0	—		0	0	12	0
Rushall Olympic	2021–22	Southern League Premier Division Central	7	0	0	0	—		0	0	7	0
Brackley Town	2022–23	National League North	41	1	1	0	—		0	0	42	1
Brackley Town	2023–24	National League North	45	1	0	0	—		0	0	45	1
Brackley Town	2024–25	National League North	30	0	0	0	—		0	0	30	0
Brackley Town	2025–26	National League	25	0	2	0	—		5 (Note: Five appearances in National League Cup)	0	32	0
Brackley Town	Brackley Town Total		141	2	3	0	0	0	5	0	149	2
Tamworth	2026–27	National League	4	0	0	0	—		2 (Note: Two appearances in National League Cup)	1 (Note: One goal in National League Cup)	6	1
Career total			262	5	5	0	7	0	18	4	289	8

== Honours ==
Aston Villa U19

- NextGen Series: 2012–13

Inverness Caledonian Thistle

- Scottish Challenge Cup: 2017–18

Brackley Town:

- National League North: 2024–25
