= Collin Seedorf =

Dutch footballer (born 1995)

Personal information
- Full name: Collin Dean Seedorf
- Date of birth: 1 May 1995 (age 31)
- Place of birth: Amsterdam, Netherlands
- Height: 1.81 m (5 ft 11 in)
- Position: Centre-back

Team information
- Current team: Željezničar
- Number: 33

Youth career
- CTO '70
- SV Diemen
- –2014: Utrecht
- 2014: Brabant United

Senior career*
Years	Team	Apps	(Gls)
2014–2017	RKC Waalwijk	45	(2)
2017–2018	Inverness Caledonian Thistle	14	(0)
2018–2020	Eindhoven	48	(5)
2020	Emmen	0	(0)
2021–2025	Eindhoven	139	(5)
2025–	Željezničar	31	(2)
- * Club domestic league appearances and goals as of 7 November 2026

Collin Dean Seedorf (born 1 May 1995) is a Dutch professional footballer who plays as a centre-back for Bosnian Premier League club Željezničar.

== Club career ==
=== RKC Waalwijk ===
Seedorf made his professional debut in the Eerste Divisie for RKC Waalwijk on 24 November 2014 in a game against Jong PSV.

=== Inverness Caledonian Thistle ===
Seedorf signed for Scottish Championship club Inverness Caledonian Thistle on 5 July 2017. He received a red card in his second game of the season against Greenock Morton. He was then ruled out of the side due to a serious ankle injury which he sustained against Royal Signals F.C. in a mid-week bounce game at Fort George. At the end of the 2017–18 season, it was announced that Seedorf would be among the handful of players leaving the club due to a lack of funds following a significantly reduced parachute payment.

=== Eindhoven ===
On 7 July 2018, Seedorf returned to the Netherlands to sign for Eindhoven in the Eerste Divisie. After spending the first half of the 2020–21 season with Emmen in the top tier Eredivisie, he returned to Eindhoven on 1 February 2021.

=== Željezničar ===
On 25 June 2025, Seedorf signed a two-year contract with Bosnian Premier League side Željezničar. He made his debut against Koper in a 2025–26 UEFA Conference League first qualifying round first leg on 10 July 2025. He scored his first goal for the club in a 1–1 league draw against Rudar Prijedor on 9 August 2025.

== Personal life ==
Born in the Netherlands, Seedorf is of Surinamese descent. He is the nephew of former Dutch international and four time Champions League winner, Clarence Seedorf.

== Career statistics ==
=== Club ===
As of match played 7 November 2026

Appearances and goals by club, season and competition
Club	Season	League			National cup		League cup		Europe		Other		Total	
Club	Season	Division	Apps	Goals	Apps	Goals	Apps	Goals	Apps	Goals	Apps	Goals	Apps	Goals
RKC Waalwijk	2014–15	Eerste Divisie	17	2	0	0	—		—		—		17	2
RKC Waalwijk	2015–16	Eerste Divisie	19	0	1	0	—		—		—		20	0
RKC Waalwijk	2016–17	Eerste Divisie	9	0	1	0	—		—		2 (Note: Appearance in the Eerste Divisie play-offs)	0	12	0
RKC Waalwijk	Total		45	2	2	0	0	0	—		2	0	49	2
Inverness Caledonian Thistle	2017–18	Scottish Championship	14	0	0	0	3	0	—		2 (Note: Appearances in the Scottish Challenge Cup)	0	19	0
Eindhoven	2018–19	Eerste Divisie	33	4	1	0	—		—		0	0	34	4
Eindhoven	2019–20	Eerste Divisie	15	1	1	0	—		—		0	0	16	1
Eindhoven	Total		48	5	2	0	0	0	—		0	0	50	5
Emmen	2020–21	Eredivisie	0	0	0	0	—		—		0	0	0	0
Eindhoven	2020–21	Eerste Divisie	9	0	—		—		—		0	0	9	0
Eindhoven	2021–22	Eerste Divisie	30	1	0	0	—		—		4	0	34	1
Eindhoven	2022–23	Eerste Divisie	34	3	2	0	—		—		2	0	38	3
Eindhoven	2023–24	Eerste Divisie	28	0	2	0	—		—		0	0	30	0
Eindhoven	2024–25	Eerste Divisie	38	1	1	0	—		—		0	0	39	1
Eindhoven	Total		139	5	5	0	0	0	—		6	0	150	5
Željezničar	2025–26	Bosnian Premier League	30	2	3	1	—		2	0	—		35	3
Željezničar	2026–27	Bosnian Premier League	1	0	0	0	—		0	0	—		1	0
Željezničar	Total		31	2	3	1	—		2	0	—		36	3
Career total			277	14	12	1	3	0	2	0	10	0	304	15

== Honours ==
Inverness Caledonian Thistle

- Scottish Challenge Cup: 2017–18
