= Connor Bell (footballer) =

English footballer

Personal information
- Full name: Connor Bell
- Date of birth: 15 July 1996 (age 30)
- Place of birth: Durham, England
- Position: Striker

Team information
- Current team: FC Bulleen Lions

Youth career
- Sunderland
- 2012–2014: Rotherham United
- 2014–2015: Wrexham

Senior career*
Years	Team	Apps	(Gls)
2015–2016	Wrexham	0	(0)
2015–2016	→ Rhyl (loan)	26	(9)
2016–2017	Servette U21	16	(6)
2017–2018	Inverness Caledonian Thistle	29	(6)
2018–2019	Greenock Morton	1	(0)
2019	South Shields	8	(1)
2019	Preston Lions	8	(3)
2019	Whitby Town	8	(2)
2019–2020	Preston Lions	0	(0)
2020–2021	Dunston UTS	3	(1)
2021–2022	Hebburn Town	22	(10)
2022–2025	Preston Lions	99	(38)
2026–	FC Bulleen Lions	20	(9)
- * Club domestic league appearances and goals as of 29 May 2026

Connor Bell (born 15 July 1996) is an English professional footballer who plays as a striker in Australia for FC Bulleen Lions in the Victoria Premier League 1.

== Career ==
In the summer of 2017, Bell joined Scottish Championship side Inverness Caledonian Thistle after a spell in Switzerland playing for Servette's under-21 side in the fifth-tier of Swiss football where he scored six goals in 16 matches.

Bell then joined Greenock Morton in the summer of 2018 and scored on his debut against Albion Rovers.

In February 2019, having been released by Greenock Morton in the previous month, Bell signed for Evo-Stik Northern Premier League side South Shields. He scored his first goal for the club in a 4–1 over Hednesford Town

In June 2019, Bell moved to Australia, signing for Victorian State League Division 1 side Preston Lions FC. In his first half-season at the club, Bell won the championship with Preston, scoring 3 goals in 8 games.

Having joined Whitby Town in October 2019, he moved back to Preston in December, before linking up with Dunston UTS in October 2020.

With the season being cut short, Bell bagged one goal in three games, with his sole strike winning Dunston three points in a 4-3 victory against Brighouse Town.

He moved to Northern Premier League East Division rivals, Hebburn Town, in July 2021.

In January 2022, He moved to Australia for his old club Preston Lions for NPL Victoria 3 in 2022 seasons.

== Honours ==
Inverness Caledonian Thistle

- Scottish Challenge Cup : 2017–18
