= Andrew Dallas (referee) =

Scottish football referee (born 1983)

Andrew Dallas (born 1 February 1983) is a Scottish football referee. He regularly officiates matches in the Scottish Premiership and Scottish Championship.

In January 2015, Dallas was named on FIFA's international list. The following year, he was promoted from UEFA's third category to its second category. He has since officiated matches in the UEFA Europa League, UEFA European Under-19 Championship and UEFA Nations League, amongst others. Dallas resigned from the FIFA list in June 2019.

Dallas was appointed referee for both the 2018 Scottish Challenge Cup Final and 2018 Scottish League Cup Final.

He is the son of former referee Hugh Dallas.
