= 2017–18 Scottish League Cup group stage =

2017–18 Scottish League Cup (group stage)
Tournament details
- Country: Scotland
- Dates: 14 July 2017 – 30 July 2017
- Teams: 40

Tournament statistics
- Matches played: 64
- Goals scored: 267 (4.17 per match)
- Top goal scorer(s): Simon Murrary; Alan Trouten (7 goals)

The 2017–18 Scottish League Cup group stage was played from 14 July to 30 July 2017. A total of 40 teams competed in the group stage. The winners of each of the eight groups, as well as the four best runners-up progressed to the second round (last 16) of the 2017–18 Scottish League Cup.

== Format ==
The group stage consisted of eight teams from the 2016–17 Scottish Premiership, ten teams from each of the 2016–17 Scottish Championship, 2016–17 Scottish League One and 2016–17 Scottish League Two, as well as the winners of the 2016–17 Highland Football League and 2016–17 Lowland Football League. The 40 teams were divided into two sections: North and South; with each section containing four top seeded teams, four second seeded teams and 12 unseeded teams. Each section was drawn into four groups with each group being made up of 1 top seed, 1 second seed and 3 unseeded sides. Seedings for the draw were confirmed on 31 May 2017, two days before the draw.

The draw for the group stages took place on Friday 2 June 2017 at 6:30pm BST at the BT Sport Studio in London and was shown live on BT Sport 2.

== Teams ==
=== North ===
==== Seeding ====
Teams in Bold qualified for the second round

Top seeds	Second seeds	Unseeded
01. Heart of Midlothian; 02. **Ross County**; 03. **Dundee**; 04. Inverness CT	09. **Hibernian**; 10. **Falkirk**; 11. **Dundee United**; 12. **Dunfermline Athletic**	17. Raith Rovers; 18. Alloa Athletic; 19. Brechin City; 20. East Fife; 21. Peterhead; 22. Arbroath; 23. Forfar Athletic; 24. Montrose; 25. Elgin City; 26. Stirling Albion; 27. Cowdenbeath; 28. Buckie Thistle

=== South ===
==== Seeding ====
Teams in Bold qualified for the second round

Top seeds	Second seeds	Unseeded
05. **Partick Thistle**; 06. **Kilmarnock**; 07. **Motherwell**; 08. **Hamilton Academical**	13. Greenock Morton; 14. Queen of the South; 15. St Mirren; 16. Dumbarton	29. **Ayr United**; 30. **Livingston**; 31. Airdrieonians; 32. Queen's Park; 33. Stranraer; 34. Albion Rovers; 35. Stenhousemuir; 36. Annan Athletic; 37. Edinburgh City; 38. Berwick Rangers; 39. Clyde; 40. East Kilbride

== North ==
=== Group A ===
Pos	Team	Pld	W	PW	PL	L	GF	GA	GD	Pts	Qualification	FAL	INV	STI	BRE	FOR
1	Falkirk (Q)	4	4	0	0	0	13	1	+12	12	Qualification for the Second Round	—	—	4–1	—	4–0
2	Inverness Caledonian Thistle	4	2	1	0	1	5	3	+2	8		0–2	—	—	3–0	—
3	Stirling Albion	4	2	0	1	1	6	5	+1	7		—	0–0p	—	2–0	—
4	Brechin City	4	0	1	0	3	1	9	−8	2		0–3	—	—	—	p1–1
5	Forfar Athletic	4	0	0	1	3	3	10	−7	1		—	1–2	1–3	—	—

Rules for classification: 1) goal difference, 2) goals scored, 3) away goals scored, 4) matches won, 5) away matches won, 6) drawing of lots.
(Q) Qualified to the phase indicated

==== Matches ====
15 July 2017
15:00

Falkirk	4–1	Stirling Albion
Austin 24'; McKee 26'; Harris 39'; Muirhead 57'	Report	Smith 87'

Falkirk Stadium, Falkirk
Attendance: 2,044
Referee: David Lowe
15 July 2017
15:00

Inverness Caledonian Thistle	3–0	Brechin City
Warren 21', 34'; Oakley 57'	Report

Caledonian Stadium, Inverness
Attendance: 1,419
Referee: Barry Cook
18 July 2017
19:45

Brechin City	1–1	Forfar Athletic
Layne 68'	Report	Millar 90+1' (pen.)
Penalties
Dyer (penalty scored); Dale (penalty missed); Crighton (penalty scored); Jackson (penalty scored); Love (penalty missed); Orsi (penalty scored)	4–3	(penalty scored) Millar; (penalty missed) Easton; (penalty scored) Munro; (penalty missed) Cox; (penalty scored) McBride; (penalty missed) See

Glebe Park, Brechin
Attendance: 526
Referee: Craig Napier
18 July 2017
19:45

Stirling Albion	0–0	Inverness Caledonian Thistle
	Report
Penalties
Dickson (penalty missed); Morrison (penalty missed); D Smith (penalty missed); McMullan (penalty missed)	0–2	(penalty missed) Baird; (penalty missed) Chalmers; (penalty scored) Polworth; (penalty scored) Vigurs

Forthbank Stadium, Stirling
Attendance: 591
Referee: Mike Roncone
22 July 2017
15:00

Forfar Athletic	1–3	Stirling Albion
Millar 90+3'	Report	Morrison 7', 44'; Kavanagh 76'

Station Park, Forfar
Attendance: 441
Referee: Gavin Ross
22 July 2017
15:00

Inverness Caledonian Thistle	0–2	Falkirk
	Report	McKee 21'; Austin 43'

Caledonian Stadium, Inverness
Referee: John Beaton
25 July 2017
15:00

Falkirk	4–0	Forfar Athletic
Hippolyte 8', 38', 50'; Austin 29'	Report

Falkirk Stadium, Falkirk
Attendance: 2,187
Referee: Kevin Graham
25 July 2017
15:00

Stirling Albion	2–0	Brechin City
MacDonald 40' (pen.); Caddis 90+1' (pen.)	Report

Forthbank Stadium, Stirling
Attendance: 430
Referee: Alan Newlands
29 July 2017
15:00

Brechin City	0–3	Falkirk
	Report	Miller 20'; McKee 52'; Harris 72'

Glebe Park, Brechin
Attendance: 712
Referee: Euan Anderson
29 July 2017
15:00

Forfar Athletic	1–2	Inverness Caledonian Thistle
Scott 49'	Report	Oakley 54'; Baird 55'

Station Park, Forfar
Attendance: 517
Referee: Gavin Duncan

=== Group B ===
Pos	Team	Pld	W	PW	PL	L	GF	GA	GD	Pts	Qualification	DNF	PET	HOM	EFI	ELG
1	Dunfermline Athletic (Q)	4	2	2	0	0	13	3	+10	10	Qualification for the Second Round	—	5–1	—	—	6–0
2	Peterhead	4	3	0	0	1	7	6	+1	9		—	—	2–1	1–0	—
3	Heart of Midlothian	4	2	0	1	1	7	4	+3	7		2–2p	—	—	3–0	—
4	East Fife	4	1	0	1	2	3	6	−3	4		0–0p	—	—	—	3–2
5	Elgin City	4	0	0	0	4	2	13	−11	0		—	0–3	0–1	—	—

Rules for classification: 1) goal difference, 2) goals scored, 3) away goals scored, 4) matches won, 5) away matches won, 6) drawing of lots.
(Q) Qualified to the phase indicated

==== Matches ====
15 July 2017
15:00

Dunfermline Athletic	6–0	Elgin City
Clark 10', 20', 35', 47'; Paton 33'; Smith 90+1'	Report

East End Park, Dunfermline
Attendance: 1,757
Referee: David Munro
15 July 2017
15:00

Peterhead	1–0	East Fife
McAllister 10'	Report

Balmoor Stadium, Peterhead
Attendance: 454
Referee: Graham Beaton
18 July 2017
19:45

East Fife	0–0	Dunfermline Athletic
	Report
Penalties
Docherty (penalty scored); Willis (penalty scored); Slattery (penalty scored); Duggan (penalty scored); Watson (penalty scored); Mutch (penalty scored); Wilson (penalty scored); Dunsmore (penalty scored); Gordon (penalty missed)	8–9	(penalty scored) Shiels; (penalty scored) Paton; (penalty scored) Clark; (penalty scored) Cardle; (penalty scored) Lochhead; (penalty scored) Morris; (penalty scored) Ashcroft; (penalty scored) Williamson; (penalty scored) Smith

Bayview Stadium, Methil
Attendance: 1,094
Referee: Gavin Ross
18 July 2017
19:45

Elgin City	0–1	Heart of Midlothian
	Report	Lafferty 60'

Borough Briggs, Elgin
Attendance: 1,303
Referee: Steven Kirkland
22 July 2017
15:00

Dunfermline Athletic	5–1	Peterhead
McManus 7', 46'; Cardle 12', 22'; Ross 72' (o.g.)	Report	McAllister 63' (pen.)

East End Park, Dunfermline
Attendance: 1,878
Referee: Bobby Madden
22 July 2017
15:00

Heart of Midlothian	3–0	East Fife
Lafferty 22', 86' (pen.); Berra 70'	Report

Tynecastle Stadium, Edinburgh
Attendance: 6,265
Referee: Nick Walsh
25 July 2017
19:45

East Fife	3–2	Elgin City
Duggan 57'; Docherty 67' (pen.); Willis 82'	Report	Reilly 49', 79'

Bayview Stadium, Methil
Attendance: 331
Referee: Scott Millar
25 July 2017
20:00

Peterhead	2–1	Heart of Midlothian
Brown 6'; McAllister 90' (pen.)	Report	Lafferty 17'

Balmoor Stadium, Peterhead
Attendance: 1,602
Referee: Mat Northcroft
29 July 2017
15:00

Elgin City	0–3	Peterhead
	Report	Cairney 4'; McCracken 36'; Stevenson 54'

Borough Briggs, Elgin
Attendance: 673
Referee: Colin Steven
29 July 2017
15:00

Heart of Midlothian	2–2	Dunfermline Athletic
Cowie 20'; Gonçalves 86'	Report	Cardle 28'; McManus 52'
Penalties
McGhee (penalty missed); Lafferty (penalty scored); Martin (penalty missed); Cowie (penalty missed)	1–3	(penalty scored) Paton; (penalty scored) Lochhead; (penalty missed) McManus; (penalty scored) Wedderburn

Tynecastle Stadium, Edinburgh
Attendance: 8,404
Referee: Craig Thomson

=== Group C ===
Pos	Team	Pld	W	PW	PL	L	GF	GA	GD	Pts	Qualification	DUN	DND	RAI	COW	BUC
1	Dundee United (Q)	4	3	1	0	0	10	2	+8	11	Qualification for the Second Round	—	—	2–0	4–1	—
2	Dundee (Q)	4	3	0	1	0	8	2	+6	10	Qualification for the Second Round	1–1p	—	—	—	2–0
3	Raith Rovers	4	2	0	0	2	9	5	+4	6		—	1–2	—	2–0	—
4	Cowdenbeath	4	1	0	0	3	5	11	−6	3		—	0–3	—	—	4–2
5	Buckie Thistle	4	0	0	0	4	3	15	−12	0		0–3	—	1–6	—	—

Rules for classification: 1) goal difference, 2) goals scored, 3) away goals scored, 4) matches won, 5) away matches won, 6) drawing of lots.
(Q) Qualified to the phase indicated

==== Matches ====
15 July 2017
15:00

Cowdenbeath	4–2	Buckie Thistle
Syme 25', 62'; Muirhead 44'; Connolly 88'	Report	Dorrat 5'; Copeland 52'

Central Park, Cowdenbeath
Attendance: 308
Referee: Scott Millar
15 July 2017
15:00

Dundee United	2–0	Raith Rovers
McMullan 60'; Keatings 72' (pen.)	Report

Tannadice Park, Dundee
Attendance: 3,753
Referee: Steven McLean
18 July 2017
19:45

Raith Rovers	1–2	Dundee
Vaughan 90'	Report	Moussa 83'; Hendry 90+2'

Stark's Park, Kirkcaldy
Attendance: 2,962
Referee: Stephen Finnie
19 July 2017
20:00

Buckie Thistle	0–3	Dundee United
	Report	McMullan 17'; King 21'; Durnan 34'

Victoria Park, Buckie
Attendance: 1,200
Referee: Graham Beaton
22 July 2017
15:00

Dundee	2–0	Buckie Thistle
El Bakhtaoui 22'; Moussa 84'	Report

Dens Park, Dundee
Attendance: 2,774
Referee: Craig Charleston
23 July 2017
15:00

Dundee United	4–1	Cowdenbeath
Stanton 30'; King 45'; Fraser 67' (pen.); M Smith 80'	Report	Muirhead 76'

Tannadice Park, Dundee
Attendance: 3,253
Referee: Alan Newlands
25 July 2017
20:00

Buckie Thistle	1–6	Raith Rovers
McLeod 27'	Report	Vaughan 14' (pen.), 45'; Spence 40'; Buchanan 65', 69'; Matthews 86'

Victoria Park, Buckie
Attendance: 620
Referee: Ryan Milne
26 July 2017
19:45

Cowdenbeath	0–3	Dundee
	Report	Moussa 17', 23', 38'

Central Park, Cowdenbeath
Attendance: 1,321
Referee: Euan Anderson
29 July 2017
15:00

Raith Rovers	2–0	Cowdenbeath
Vaughan 9'; Buchanan 32'	Report

Stark's Park, Kirkcaldy
Attendance: 1,480
Referee: Kevin Graham
30 July 2017
15:00

Dundee	1–1	Dundee United
O'Hara 60'	Report	McMullan 45'
Penalties
El Bakhtaoui (penalty missed); Wolters (penalty scored); Moussa (penalty scored); O'Dea (penalty scored); Deacon (penalty missed)	3–4	(penalty scored) McMullan; (penalty scored) King; (penalty scored) Toshney; (penalty missed) Chalmers; (penalty scored) McDonald

Dens Park, Dundee
Attendance: 10,460
Referee: Kevin Clancy

=== Group D ===
Pos	Team	Pld	W	PW	PL	L	GF	GA	GD	Pts	Qualification	HIB	ROS	ARB	MON	ALO
1	Hibernian (Q)	4	3	0	1	0	13	1	+12	10	Qualification for the Second Round	—	—	6–1	4–0	—
2	Ross County (Q)	4	2	2	0	0	8	0	+8	10	Qualification for the Second Round	p0–0	—	—	—	2–0
3	Arbroath	4	1	1	1	1	6	7	−1	6		—	0–0p	—	4–0	—
4	Montrose	4	1	0	0	3	2	15	−13	3		—	0–6	—	—	2–1
5	Alloa Athletic	4	0	0	1	3	2	8	−6	1		0–3	—	1–1p	—	—

Rules for classification: 1) goal difference, 2) goals scored, 3) away goals scored, 4) matches won, 5) away matches won, 6) drawing of lots.
(Q) Qualified to the phase indicated

==== Matches ====
15 July 2017
15:00

Hibernian	4–0	Montrose
S Murray 12', 53'; F Murray 22'; Graham 88'	Report

Easter Road, Edinburgh
Attendance: 5,226
Referee: Andrew Dallas
15 July 2017
15:00

Ross County	2–0	Alloa Athletic
Fraser 40'; Curran 70'	Report

Victoria Park, Dingwall
Attendance: 1,108
Referee: John McKendrick
18 July 2017
19:45

Alloa Athletic	1–1	Arbroath
McKeown 89'	Report	Yule 16'
Penalties
Taggart (penalty scored); Hetherington (penalty scored); Flannigan (penalty scored); Graham (penalty scored); Renton (penalty missed); Martin (penalty scored); Grant (penalty missed)	5–6	(penalty scored) Doris; (penalty scored) Whatley; (penalty missed) Malin; (penalty scored) Yule; (penalty scored) Hester; (penalty scored) Little; (penalty scored) Gold

Recreation Park, Alloa
Attendance: 311
Referee: Grant Irvine
18 July 2017
19:45

Montrose	0–6	Ross County
	Report	Mikkelsen 15', 54'; Curran 27', 45+1'; Dilon 31' (o.g.); Schalk 58'

Links Park, Montrose
Attendance: 421
Referee: Alan Newlands
21 July 2017
19:45

Ross County	0–0	Hibernian
	Report
Penalties
Routis (penalty missed); O'Brien (penalty scored); Schalk (penalty scored); Fraser (penalty scored); Gardyne (penalty scored)	4–3	(penalty missed) Whittaker; (penalty scored) McGinn; (penalty scored) Boyle; (penalty scored) Murray; (penalty missed) Shaw

Victoria Park, Dingwall
Attendance: 2,065
Referee: Steven McLean
22 July 2017
15:00

Arbroath	4–0	Montrose
Gold 31'; Denholm 69', 74'; Doris 90+1'	Report

Gayfield Park, Arbroath
Attendance: 817
Referee: David Lowe
25 July 2017
19:45

Hibernian	6–1	Arbroath
S Murray 18', 51', 90+1'; Porteous 45', 88'; McGinn 53'	Report	Doris 38'

Easter Road, Edinburgh
Attendance: 4,856
Referee: Stephen Finnie
25 July 2017
19:45

Montrose	2–1	Alloa Athletic
Hay 21'; Watson 50'	Report	Flannigan 82'

Links Park, Montrose
Attendance: 257
Referee: Graeme Beaton
29 July 2017
15:00

Alloa Athletic	0–3	Hibernian
	Report	F Murray 15'; S Murray 63', 80'

Recreation Park, Alloa
Attendance: 1,758
Referee: Willie Collum
29 July 2017
15:00

Arbroath	0–0	Ross County
	Report
Penalties
Doris (penalty missed); Henry (penalty scored); Linn (penalty scored); McCord (penalty scored); Yule (penalty scored); Little (penalty missed); Gold (penalty missed)	4–5	(penalty missed) Gardyne; (penalty scored) Fraser; (penalty scored) Routis; (penalty scored) Schalk; (penalty scored) Kelly; (penalty missed) Mikkelsen; (penalty scored) Chow

Gayfield Park, Arbroath
Attendance: 702
Referee: Steven Kirkland

== South ==
=== Group E ===
Pos	Team	Pld	W	PW	PL	L	GF	GA	GD	Pts	Qualification	AYR	KIL	CLY	ANN	DUM
1	Ayr United (Q)	4	4	0	0	0	15	3	+12	12	Qualification for the Second Round	—	1–0	5–1	—	—
2	Kilmarnock (Q)	4	3	0	0	1	9	3	+6	9	Qualification for the Second Round	—	—	4–2	—	3–0
3	Clyde	4	2	0	0	2	7	11	−4	6		—	—	—	2–1	2–1
4	Annan Athletic	4	0	1	0	3	2	10	−8	2		1–6	0–2	—	—	—
5	Dumbarton	4	0	0	1	3	2	8	−6	1		1–3	—	—	0–0p	—

Rules for classification: 1) goal difference, 2) goals scored, 3) away goals scored, 4) matches won, 5) away matches won, 6) drawing of lots.
(Q) Qualified to the phase indicated

==== Matches ====
14 July 2017
19:45

Ayr United	1–0	Kilmarnock
Geggan 39'	Report

Somerset Park, Ayr
Attendance: 6,417
Referee: John Beaton
15 July 2017
15:00

Clyde	2–1	Annan Athletic
Breslin 57'; Goodwillie 89'	Report	Swinglehurst 90+1'

Broadwood Stadium, Cumbernauld
Attendance: 415
Referee: Duncan Williams
18 July 2017
19:45

Dumbarton	1–3	Ayr United
Nadé 45+2'	Report	Dowie 36' (o.g.); McDaid 71'; Crawford 88'

Dumbarton Football Stadium, Dumbarton
Attendance: 615
Referee: Barry Cook
18 July 2017
15:00

Kilmarnock	4–2	Clyde
McKenzie 7', 68'; Thomas 53', 59'	Report	Ramsay 10'; Nicholl 11'

Rugby Park, Kilmarnock
Attendance: 1,871
Referee: Craig Charleston
22 July 2017
15:00

Annan Athletic	0–2	Kilmarnock
	Report	Boyd 7', 62'

Galabank, Annan
Attendance: 743
Referee: Nick Walsh
22 July 2017
15:00

Clyde	2–1	Dumbarton
Miller 57'; Wright 67'	Report	Barr 33'

Broadwood Stadium, Cumbernauld
Attendance: 416
Referee: John McKendrick
25 July 2017
19:45

Ayr United	5–1	Clyde
Crawford 20'; Moore 30', 64'; Moffat 53'; McDaid 75'	Report	Goodwillie 12'

Somerset Park, Ayr
Attendance: 1,501
Referee: Colin Steven
25 July 2017
19:45

Dumbarton	0–0	Annan Athletic
	Report
Penalties
McLaughlin (penalty missed); Stewart (penalty missed); C Gallagher (penalty scored); Barr (penalty scored); Roy (penalty scored)	3–4	(penalty scored) Smith; (penalty scored) Sinnamon; (penalty scored) Omar; (penalty missed) Orsi; (penalty scored) Stevenson

Dumbarton Football Stadium, Dumbarton
Attendance: 366
Referee: Craig Charleston
29 July 2017
15:00

Annan Athletic	1–6	Ayr United
Sinnamon 85'	Report	Docherty 1'; McGuffie 3'; Moffat 25'; Moore 45'; Geggan 67'; McDaid 81'

Galabank, Annan
Attendance: 659
Referee: Steven Reid
29 July 2017
15:00

Kilmarnock	3–0	Dumbarton
Burke 53'; Boyd 72'; Erwin 76'	Report

Rugby Park, Kilmarnock
Attendance: 2,444
Referee: Bobby Madden

=== Group F ===
Pos	Team	Pld	W	PW	PL	L	GF	GA	GD	Pts	Qualification	MOT	GMO	QPA	EDC	BER
1	Motherwell (Q)	4	4	0	0	0	12	2	+10	12	Qualification for the Second Round	—	4–0	—	—	1–0
2	Greenock Morton	4	2	1	0	1	8	6	+2	8		—	—	p2–2	5–0	—
3	Queen's Park	4	2	0	1	1	9	9	0	7		1–5	—	—	3–0	—
4	Edinburgh City	4	0	1	0	3	3	12	−9	2		1–2	—	—	—	p2–2
5	Berwick Rangers	4	0	0	1	3	4	7	−3	1		—	0–1	2–3	—	—

Rules for classification: 1) goal difference, 2) goals scored, 3) away goals scored, 4) matches won, 5) away matches won, 6) drawing of lots.
(Q) Qualified to the phase indicated

==== Matches ====
15 July 2017
15:00

Berwick Rangers	0–1	Greenock Morton
	Report	Fleming 33' (o.g.)

Shielfield Park, Berwick-upon-Tweed, England
Attendance: 701
Referee: Grant Irvine
15 July 2017
15:00

Queen's Park	1–5	Motherwell
Cummins 23'	Report	Cadden 10'; Tanner 53'; Bowman 75', 78'; Moult 85'

Hampden Park, Glasgow
Attendance: 1,590
Referee: Don Robertson
18 July 2017
19:45

Edinburgh City	2–2	Berwick Rangers
Grimes 23', 31'	Report	Murrell 30'; Scullion 84'
Penalties
Grimes (penalty scored); Allan (penalty scored); Walker (penalty scored); Laird (penalty scored)	4–2	(penalty scored) McKenna; (penalty scored) Irving; (penalty missed) McDonald; (penalty missed) Scullion

Ainslie Park, Edinburgh
Attendance: 247
Referee: Stephen Brown
18 July 2017
19:45

Greenock Morton	2–2	Queen's Park
Wharton 70'; Orr 81'	Report	McHugh 85'; Barr 90+2'
Penalties
Orr (penalty missed); Tiffoney (penalty scored); Murdoch (penalty scored); Lamie (penalty scored); Harkins	4–2	(penalty missed) Orr; (penalty scored) Cummins; (penalty scored) Wharton; (penalty missed) K Green

Cappielow, Greenock
Attendance: 1,220
Referee: Colin Stephen
22 July 2017
15:00

Motherwell	4–0	Greenock Morton
Dunne 3'; Cadden 25'; Tait 67'; Moult 72'	Report

Fir Park, Motherwell
Attendance: 3,113
Referee: Kevin Clancy
22 July 2017
15:00

Queen's Park	3–0	Edinburgh City
D Docherty 20'; McKee 55' (o.g.); Brady 62'	Report

Hampden Park, Glasgow
Attendance: 404
Referee: Kevin Graham
25 July 2017
19:45

Berwick Rangers	2–3	Queen's Park
Rutherford 1'; Thomson 83'	Report	Millen 9' (pen.); Brady 33'; Galt 39'

Shielfield Park, Berwick-upon-Tweed, England
Attendance: 305
Referee: Gavin Ross
25 July 2017
19:45

Edinburgh City	1–2	Motherwell
Grimes 69'	Report	Cadden 74'; Frear 89'

Ainslie Park, Edinburgh
Attendance: 970
Referee: Gavin Duncan
29 July 2017
15:00

Greenock Morton	5–0	Edinburgh City
McHugh 14', 90+2'; Quitongo 53'; Thomson 73', 79'	Report

Cappielow, Greenock
Attendance: 1,065
Referee: Mike Roncone
29 July 2017
15:00

Motherwell	1–0	Berwick Rangers
Frear 82'	Report

Fir Park, Motherwell
Attendance: 2,524
Referee: Stephen Finnie

=== Group G ===
Pos	Team	Pld	W	PW	PL	L	GF	GA	GD	Pts	Qualification	HAM	ALB	QOS	EKI	STE
1	Hamilton Academical (Q)	4	2	1	1	0	10	6	+4	9	Qualification for the Second Round	—	—	p1–1	—	3–0
2	Albion Rovers	4	1	1	2	0	12	9	+3	7		p4–4	—	—	—	1–1p
3	Queen of the South	4	1	1	2	0	6	4	+2	7		—	p2–2	—	0–0p	—
4	East Kilbride	4	1	1	0	2	5	9	−4	5		1–3	2–5	—	—	—
5	Stenhousemuir	4	0	1	0	3	3	9	−6	2		—	—	1–3	1–2	—

Rules for classification: 1) goal difference, 2) goals scored, 3) away goals scored, 4) matches won, 5) away matches won, 6) drawing of lots.
(Q) Qualified to the phase indicated

==== Matches ====
15 July 2017
14:00

East Kilbride	1–3	Hamilton Academical
Winter 69' (pen.)	Report	MacKinnon 39'; Longridge 81'; Crawford 90+1'

K-Park Training Academy, East Kilbride
Attendance: 531
Referee: Craig Napier
15 July 2017
15:00

Stenhousemuir	1–3	Queen of the South
McGuigan 16'	Report	Dobbie 69', 85'; Rooney 83'

Ochilview Park, Stenhousemuir
Attendance: 384
Referee: Gavin Duncan
18 July 2017
19:45

Albion Rovers	1–1	Stenhousemuir
Trouten 59' (pen.)	Report	McMenamin 15'
Penalties
Victoria (penalty missed); Davidson (penalty missed); McLaughlin (penalty scored); Holmes (penalty missed); Fisher (penalty scored); Shields (penalty missed)	2–3	(penalty missed) McMenamin; (penalty missed) Blockley; (penalty scored) Longworth; (penalty missed) M Dunlop; (penalty scored) Meechan; (penalty scored) Fisher

Cliftonhill, Coatbridge
Attendance: 244
Referee: David Munro
18 July 2017
19:45

Queen of the South	0–0	East Kilbride
	Report
Penalties
Jacobs (penalty missed); Tapping (penalty missed); Dobbie (penalty scored)	1–4	(penalty scored) Strachan; (penalty scored) Ferris; (penalty scored) Hughes; (penalty scored) McNeil

Palmerston Park, Dumfries
Attendance: 1,055
Referee: David Lowe
22 July 2017
15:00

East Kilbride	2–5	Albion Rovers
Winter 67'; McMullin 68' (o.g.)	Report	Trouten 2'; Fisher 5'; Shields 46', 54', 72'

K-Park Training Academy, East Kilbride
Attendance: 261
Referee: Steven Reid
22 July 2017
15:00

Hamilton Academical	1–1	Queen of the South
Boyd 88'	Report	Dobbie 89'
Penalties
Gillespie (penalty missed); Redmond (penalty missed); Crawford (penalty scored); Sarris (penalty scored); Bingham (penalty scored); Boyd (penalty scored); MacKinnon (penalty scored); Templeton (penalty scored)	6–5	(penalty scored) Lyle; (penalty scored) Dobbie; (penalty missed) Dykes; (penalty scored) Jacobs; (penalty missed) Rankin; (penalty scored) Fordyce; (penalty scored) Tapping; (penalty missed) Brownlie

New Douglas Park, Hamilton
Attendance: 1,047
Referee: Willie Collum
25 July 2017
19:30

Stenhousemuir	1–2	East Kilbride
Longworth 50'	Report	Winter 46', 63'

Ochilview Park, Stenhousemuir
Attendance: 201
Referee: David Dickinson
25 July 2017
19:45

Albion Rovers	4–4	Hamilton Academical
Trouten 9', 53', 64'; Davidson 90+3'	Report	Donati 38'; Want 45+2', 57'; Bingham 74' (pen.)
Penalties
McMullin (penalty scored); Hopkins (penalty scored); McLaughlin (penalty scored); Trouten (penalty scored)	4–2	(penalty missed) Donati; (penalty missed) Docherty; (penalty scored) Crawford; (penalty scored) Bingham

Cliftonhill, Coatbridge
Attendance: 497
Referee: Barry Cook
29 July 2017
15:00

Hamilton Academical	3–0	Stenhousemuir
Crawford 15'; Templeton 56'; Boyd 74'	Report

New Douglas Park, Hamilton
Attendance: 657
Referee: Steven McLean
29 July 2017
15:00

Queen of the South	2–2	Albion Rovers
Dobbie 64'; Brownlie 85'	Report	Trouten 38', 82' (pen.)
Penalties
Dobbie (penalty scored); Murray (penalty scored); Leighfield (penalty missed); Fordyce (penalty scored); Jacobs (penalty scored)	4–3	(penalty scored) McLaughlin; (penalty missed) Reid; (penalty missed) Davidson; (penalty scored) Trouten; (penalty scored) Higgins

Palmerston Park, Dumfries
Attendance: 1,002
Referee: Scott Millar

=== Group H ===
Pos	Team	Pld	W	PW	PL	L	GF	GA	GD	Pts	Qualification	LIV	PAR	STM	AIR	STR
1	Livingston (Q)	4	3	1	0	0	8	3	+5	11	Qualification for the Second Round	—	p1–1	—	2–0	—
2	Partick Thistle (Q)	4	3	0	1	0	9	2	+7	10	Qualification for the Second Round	—	—	5–0	—	1–0
3	St Mirren	4	2	0	0	2	9	7	+2	6		0–1	—	—	5–0	—
4	Airdrieonians	4	1	0	0	3	4	10	−6	3		—	1–2	—	—	3–1
5	Stranraer	4	0	0	0	4	4	12	−8	0		2–4	—	1–4	—	—

Rules for classification: 1) goal difference, 2) goals scored, 3) away goals scored, 4) matches won, 5) away matches won, 6) drawing of lots.
(Q) Qualified to the phase indicated

==== Matches ====
15 July 2017
15:00

Livingston	1–1	Partick Thistle
Jacobs 46'	Report	Erskine 14'
Penalties
Mackin (penalty scored); Mullin (penalty scored); Jacobs (penalty scored)	3–1	(penalty scored) Bannigan; (penalty missed) Elliott; (penalty missed) Spittal; (penalty missed) Doolan

Almondvale Stadium, Livingston
Attendance: 1,119
Referee: Kevin Clancy
15 July 2017
15:00

Stranraer	1–4	St Mirren
Agnew 11'	Report	Reilly 27'; Stewart 31'; Morgan 40'; Buchanan 56'

Stair Park, Stranraer
Attendance: 849
Referee: Colin Steven
18 July 2017
19:45

Airdrieonians	3–1	Stranraer
Russell 29', 67'; Ryan 63' (pen.)	Report	Robertson 81'

Excelsior Stadium, Airdrie
Attendance: 490
Referee: Gavin Duncan
18 July 2017
19:45

St Mirren	0–1	Livingston
	Report	Carrick 2'

St Mirren Park, Paisley
Attendance: 2,104
Referee: Alan Muir
22 July 2017
15:00

Livingston	2–0	Airdrieonians
Mackin 21'; Halkett 53'	Report

Almondvale Stadium, Livingston
Attendance: 617
Referee: Mike Roncone
22 July 2017
15:00

Partick Thistle	5–0	St Mirren
Doolan 12'; Lawless 23', 33'; Spittal 38', 59'	Report

Firhill Park, Glasgow
Attendance: 2,727
Referee: Stephen Finnie
25 July 2017
19:45

Airdrieonians	1–2	Partick Thistle
Cairns 55'	Report	Doolan 10'; Spittal 40'

Excelsior Stadium, Airdrie
Attendance: 1,255
Referee: Don Robertson
25 July 2017
19:45

Stranraer	2–4	Livingston
Neill 5'; Agnew 33' (pen.)	Report	Robertson 10' (o.g.); Carrick 32'; Todorov 61'; Robinson 80'

Stair Park, Stranraer
Attendance: 341
Referee: John McKendrick
29 July 2017
15:00

Partick Thistle	1–0	Stranraer
Elliott 87'	Report

Firhill Park, Glasgow
Attendance: 2,185
Referee: John Beaton
29 July 2017
15:00

St Mirren	5–0	Airdrieonians
MacDonald 8' (o.g.); Reilly 31', 69'; Morgan 82'; Smith 88'	Report

St Mirren Park, Paisley
Attendance: 1,557
Referee: Craig Napier

== Best runners-up ==
Pos	Grp	Team	Pld	W	PW	PL	L	GF	GA	GD	Pts	Qualification
1	D	Ross County (Q)	4	2	2	0	0	8	0	+8	10	Qualification for the Second Round
2	H	Partick Thistle (Q)	4	3	0	1	0	9	2	+7	10	Qualification for the Second Round
3	C	Dundee (Q)	4	3	0	1	0	8	2	+6	10	Qualification for the Second Round
4	E	Kilmarnock (Q)	4	3	0	0	1	9	3	+6	9	Qualification for the Second Round
5	B	Peterhead	4	3	0	0	1	7	6	+1	9	
6	F	Greenock Morton	4	2	1	0	1	8	6	+2	8	
7	A	Inverness CT	4	2	1	0	1	5	3	+2	8	
8	G	Albion Rovers	4	1	1	2	0	12	9	+3	7	

Rules for classification: 1) goal difference, 2) goals scored, 3) away goals scored, 4) matches won, 5) away matches won, 6) drawing of lots.
(Q) Qualified to the phase indicated

== Qualified teams ==
Team	Qualified as	Qualified on	Notes
Falkirk	Group A winner	25 July 2017	Seeded for the Second Round draw
Motherwell	Group F winner	25 July 2017	Seeded for the Second Round draw
Livingston	Group H winner	25 July 2017	
Dunfermline Athletic	Group B winner	29 July 2017	
Hibernian	Group D winner	29 July 2017	
Ayr United	Group E winner	29 July 2017	Seeded for the Second Round draw
Hamilton Academical	Group G winner	29 July 2017	
Ross County	Best runner-up	29 July 2017	
Kilmarnock	Best runner-up	29 July 2017	
Partick Thistle	Best runner-up	29 July 2017	
Dundee United	Group C winner	30 July 2017	Seeded for the Second Round draw
Dundee	Best runner-up	30 July 2017	

== Top goalscorers ==
There were 267 goals scored in 80 matches in the group stage, for an average of 3.34 goals per match.

As of matches played on 30 July 2017

Rank	Player	Club	Goals
1	(Scotland) Alan Trouten	Albion Rovers	7
1	(Scotland) Simon Murray	Hibernian	7
3	(Tunisia) Sofien Moussa	Dundee	5
4	(Scotland) Nicky Clark	Dunfermline Athletic	4
4	(Scotland) Sean Winter	East Kilbride	4
4	(Northern Ireland) Kyle Lafferty	Heart of Midlothian	4
4	(Scotland) Stephen Dobbie	Queen of the South	4
4	(Scotland) Lewis Vaughan	Raith Rovers	4
9	18 players		3
