= 2017–18 Scottish League Cup =

Tournament details
- Country: Scotland
- Dates: 15 July 2017 – 26 November 2017
- Teams: 44

Final positions
- Champions: Celtic
- Runners-up: Motherwell

Tournament statistics
- Matches played: 95
- Goals scored: 324 (3.41 per match)
- Top goal scorer: Simon Murray (8 goals)

The 2017–18 Scottish League Cup (also known as the Betfred Cup for sponsorship reasons) was the 72nd season of Scotland's second-most prestigious football knockout competition.

The format for the 2017–18 competition remained the same as that which was introduced in the previous season's competition.

It began with eight groups of five teams which included all Scottish Professional Football League (SPFL) clubs, excluding those competing in Champions League and Europa League qualifiers, as well as the winners of the 2016–17 Highland Football League (Buckie Thistle) and the 2016–17 Lowland Football League (East Kilbride).

The competition was won by Celtic, who beat Motherwell 2–0 in the final on 26 November 2017.

== Schedule ==
Round	First match date	Fixtures	Clubs
Group stage	15 July 2017	80	44 → 16
Second round	8 August 2017	8	16 → 8
Quarter finals	19 September 2017	4	8 → 4
Semi finals	21 October 2017	2	4 → 2
Final	26 November 2017	1	2 → 1

== Format ==
The competition began with eight groups of five teams. The four clubs competing in the UEFA Champions League (Celtic) and Europa League (Aberdeen, Rangers and St Johnstone) qualifying rounds were given a bye through to the second round. The 40 teams competing in the group stage consisted of the other eight teams that competed in the 2016–17 Scottish Premiership, and all of the teams that competed in the 2016–17 Scottish Championship, 2016–17 Scottish League One and 2016–17 Scottish League Two, as well as the 2016–17 Highland Football League and the 2016–17 Lowland Football League champions.

The winners of each of the eight groups, as well as the four best runners-up progressed to the second round (last 16), which included the four UEFA qualifying clubs. At this stage, the competition reverted to the traditional knock-out format. The four group winners with the highest points total and the clubs entering at this stage were seeded, with the four group winners with the lowest points unseeded along with the four best runners-up.

=== Bonus point system ===
In December 2015, the SPFL announced that alongside the new group stage format, a bonus point system would be introduced to provide greater excitement and increase the number of meaningful games at this stage. The traditional point system of awarding three points for a win and one point for a draw was used, however, for each group stage match that finished in a draw, a penalty shoot-out took place, with the winner being awarded a bonus point.

== Group stage ==
The group stage was made up of eight teams from the 2016–17 Scottish Premiership, and all ten teams from each of the 2016–17 Scottish Championship, 2016–17 Scottish League One and 2016–17 Scottish League Two, as well as the winners of the 2016–17 Highland Football League and 2016–17 Lowland Football League. The 40 teams were divided into two sections: North and South; with each section containing four top seeded teams, four second seeded teams and 12 unseeded teams. Each section was drawn into four groups with each group being made up of one top seed, one second seed and three unseeded sides. Seedings for the draw were confirmed on 31 May 2017, two days before the draw.

The draw for the group stages took place on Friday 2 June 2017 at 6:30pm BST at the BT Sport Studio in London and was shown live on BT Sport 2.

=== North section ===
==== Group A ====
Pos	Team	Pld	W	PW	PL	L	GF	GA	GD	Pts	Qualification	FAL	INV	STI	BRE	FOR
1	Falkirk (Q)	4	4	0	0	0	13	1	+12	12	Qualification for the Second Round	—	—	4–1	—	4–0
2	Inverness Caledonian Thistle	4	2	1	0	1	5	3	+2	8		0–2	—	—	3–0	—
3	Stirling Albion	4	2	0	1	1	6	5	+1	7		—	0–0p	—	2–0	—
4	Brechin City	4	0	1	0	3	1	9	−8	2		0–3	—	—	—	p1–1
5	Forfar Athletic	4	0	0	1	3	3	10	−7	1		—	1–2	1–3	—	—

Rules for classification: 1) goal difference, 2) goals scored, 3) away goals scored, 4) matches won, 5) away matches won, 6) drawing of lots.
(Q) Qualified to the phase indicated

==== Group B ====
Pos	Team	Pld	W	PW	PL	L	GF	GA	GD	Pts	Qualification	DNF	PET	HOM	EFI	ELG
1	Dunfermline Athletic (Q)	4	2	2	0	0	13	3	+10	10	Qualification for the Second Round	—	5–1	—	—	6–0
2	Peterhead	4	3	0	0	1	7	6	+1	9		—	—	2–1	1–0	—
3	Heart of Midlothian	4	2	0	1	1	7	4	+3	7		2–2p	—	—	3–0	—
4	East Fife	4	1	0	1	2	3	6	−3	4		0–0p	—	—	—	3–2
5	Elgin City	4	0	0	0	4	2	13	−11	0		—	0–3	0–1	—	—

Rules for classification: 1) goal difference, 2) goals scored, 3) away goals scored, 4) matches won, 5) away matches won, 6) drawing of lots.
(Q) Qualified to the phase indicated

==== Group C ====
Pos	Team	Pld	W	PW	PL	L	GF	GA	GD	Pts	Qualification	DUN	DND	RAI	COW	BUC
1	Dundee United (Q)	4	3	1	0	0	10	2	+8	11	Qualification for the Second Round	—	—	2–0	4–1	—
2	Dundee (Q)	4	3	0	1	0	8	2	+6	10	Qualification for the Second Round	1–1p	—	—	—	2–0
3	Raith Rovers	4	2	0	0	2	9	5	+4	6		—	1–2	—	2–0	—
4	Cowdenbeath	4	1	0	0	3	5	11	−6	3		—	0–3	—	—	4–2
5	Buckie Thistle	4	0	0	0	4	3	15	−12	0		0–3	—	1–6	—	—

Rules for classification: 1) goal difference, 2) goals scored, 3) away goals scored, 4) matches won, 5) away matches won, 6) drawing of lots.
(Q) Qualified to the phase indicated

==== Group D ====
Pos	Team	Pld	W	PW	PL	L	GF	GA	GD	Pts	Qualification	HIB	ROS	ARB	MON	ALO
1	Hibernian (Q)	4	3	0	1	0	13	1	+12	10	Qualification for the Second Round	—	—	6–1	4–0	—
2	Ross County (Q)	4	2	2	0	0	8	0	+8	10	Qualification for the Second Round	p0–0	—	—	—	2–0
3	Arbroath	4	1	1	1	1	6	7	−1	6		—	0–0p	—	4–0	—
4	Montrose	4	1	0	0	3	2	15	−13	3		—	0–6	—	—	2–1
5	Alloa Athletic	4	0	0	1	3	2	8	−6	1		0–3	—	1–1p	—	—

Rules for classification: 1) goal difference, 2) goals scored, 3) away goals scored, 4) matches won, 5) away matches won, 6) drawing of lots.
(Q) Qualified to the phase indicated

=== South section ===
==== Group E ====
Pos	Team	Pld	W	PW	PL	L	GF	GA	GD	Pts	Qualification	AYR	KIL	CLY	ANN	DUM
1	Ayr United (Q)	4	4	0	0	0	15	3	+12	12	Qualification for the Second Round	—	1–0	5–1	—	—
2	Kilmarnock (Q)	4	3	0	0	1	9	3	+6	9	Qualification for the Second Round	—	—	4–2	—	3–0
3	Clyde	4	2	0	0	2	7	11	−4	6		—	—	—	2–1	2–1
4	Annan Athletic	4	0	1	0	3	2	10	−8	2		1–6	0–2	—	—	—
5	Dumbarton	4	0	0	1	3	2	8	−6	1		1–3	—	—	0–0p	—

Rules for classification: 1) goal difference, 2) goals scored, 3) away goals scored, 4) matches won, 5) away matches won, 6) drawing of lots.
(Q) Qualified to the phase indicated

==== Group F ====
Pos	Team	Pld	W	PW	PL	L	GF	GA	GD	Pts	Qualification	MOT	GMO	QPA	EDC	BER
1	Motherwell (Q)	4	4	0	0	0	12	2	+10	12	Qualification for the Second Round	—	4–0	—	—	1–0
2	Greenock Morton	4	2	1	0	1	8	6	+2	8		—	—	p2–2	5–0	—
3	Queen's Park	4	2	0	1	1	9	9	0	7		1–5	—	—	3–0	—
4	Edinburgh City	4	0	1	0	3	3	12	−9	2		1–2	—	—	—	p2–2
5	Berwick Rangers	4	0	0	1	3	4	7	−3	1		—	0–1	2–3	—	—

Rules for classification: 1) goal difference, 2) goals scored, 3) away goals scored, 4) matches won, 5) away matches won, 6) drawing of lots.
(Q) Qualified to the phase indicated

==== Group G ====
Pos	Team	Pld	W	PW	PL	L	GF	GA	GD	Pts	Qualification	HAM	ALB	QOS	EKI	STE
1	Hamilton Academical (Q)	4	2	1	1	0	10	6	+4	9	Qualification for the Second Round	—	—	p1–1	—	3–0
2	Albion Rovers	4	1	1	2	0	12	9	+3	7		p4–4	—	—	—	1–1p
3	Queen of the South	4	1	1	2	0	6	4	+2	7		—	p2–2	—	0–0p	—
4	East Kilbride	4	1	1	0	2	5	9	−4	5		1–3	2–5	—	—	—
5	Stenhousemuir	4	0	1	0	3	3	9	−6	2		—	—	1–3	1–2	—

Rules for classification: 1) goal difference, 2) goals scored, 3) away goals scored, 4) matches won, 5) away matches won, 6) drawing of lots.
(Q) Qualified to the phase indicated

==== Group H ====
Pos	Team	Pld	W	PW	PL	L	GF	GA	GD	Pts	Qualification	LIV	PAR	STM	AIR	STR
1	Livingston (Q)	4	3	1	0	0	8	3	+5	11	Qualification for the Second Round	—	p1–1	—	2–0	—
2	Partick Thistle (Q)	4	3	0	1	0	9	2	+7	10	Qualification for the Second Round	—	—	5–0	—	1–0
3	St Mirren	4	2	0	0	2	9	7	+2	6		0–1	—	—	5–0	—
4	Airdrieonians	4	1	0	0	3	4	10	−6	3		—	1–2	—	—	3–1
5	Stranraer	4	0	0	0	4	4	12	−8	0		2–4	—	1–4	—	—

Rules for classification: 1) goal difference, 2) goals scored, 3) away goals scored, 4) matches won, 5) away matches won, 6) drawing of lots.
(Q) Qualified to the phase indicated

=== Best runners-up ===
Pos	Grp	Team	Pld	W	PW	PL	L	GF	GA	GD	Pts	Qualification
1	D	Ross County (Q)	4	2	2	0	0	8	0	+8	10	Qualification for the Second Round
2	H	Partick Thistle (Q)	4	3	0	1	0	9	2	+7	10	Qualification for the Second Round
3	C	Dundee (Q)	4	3	0	1	0	8	2	+6	10	Qualification for the Second Round
4	E	Kilmarnock (Q)	4	3	0	0	1	9	3	+6	9	Qualification for the Second Round
5	B	Peterhead	4	3	0	0	1	7	6	+1	9	
6	F	Greenock Morton	4	2	1	0	1	8	6	+2	8	
7	A	Inverness CT	4	2	1	0	1	5	3	+2	8	
8	G	Albion Rovers	4	1	1	2	0	12	9	+3	7	

Rules for classification: 1) goal difference, 2) goals scored, 3) away goals scored, 4) matches won, 5) away matches won, 6) drawing of lots.
(Q) Qualified to the phase indicated

== Knockout phase ==
=== Second round ===
==== Draw and seeding ====
The following teams qualified and competed in the second round of the 2017–18 Scottish League Cup. Aberdeen, Celtic, Rangers and St Johnstone entered the competition at this stage, after receiving a bye for the group stage due to their participation in UEFA club competitions.

The draw for the second round took place at Dens Park following the conclusion of the Dundee derby on 30 July, and was shown live on BT Sport's Facebook page & BT Sport 1. The four UEFA-qualifying clubs and the four group winners with the best record were seeded for the draw.

Teams in Bold advanced to the quarter-finals.

Seeded	Unseeded
**Aberdeen**; Ayr United*; **Celtic**; Dundee United†; Falkirk†; **Motherwell**; **Rangers**; St Johnstone	**Dundee**; Dunfermline Athletic†; Hamilton Academical; **Hibernian**; Kilmarnock; **Livingston**†; **Partick Thistle**; Ross County

Notes

- † denotes teams playing in the Championship.
- * denotes team playing in League One.

==== Matches ====
All times are BST (UTC+1).

8 August 2017	St Johnstone	**0–3**	**Partick Thistle**	Perth
19:45		Report	Lawless 50' (pen.); Edwards 62'; Erskine 90'	Stadium: McDiarmid Park; Attendance: 2,619; Referee: Euan Anderson

8 August 2017	**Hibernian**	**5–0**	Ayr United	Edinburgh
19:45	Stokes 20', 59'; S Murray 31'; Ambrose 69'; Matulevičius 85'	Report		Stadium: Easter Road; Attendance: 8,135; Referee: Kevin Clancy

8 August 2017	Falkirk	**1–2 (a.e.t.)**	**Livingston**	Falkirk
19:45	Craigen 40'	Report	Robinson 32'; De Vita 101'	Stadium: Falkirk Stadium; Attendance: 2,677; Referee: Andrew Dallas

8 August 2017	**Celtic**	**5–0**	Kilmarnock	Glasgow
19:45	Griffiths 14' (pen.), 29'; Ralston 21'; Tierney 65'; Armstrong 71'	Report		Stadium: Celtic Park; Attendance: 27,407; Referee: Alan Muir

9 August 2017	**Rangers**	**6–0**	Dunfermline Athletic	Glasgow
19:45	Miller 5'; Alves 9'; Morelos 23', 75'; Tavernier 27'; Candeias 57'	Report		Stadium: Ibrox Stadium; Attendance: 35,262; Referee: Don Robertson

9 August 2017	Ross County	**2–3 (a.e.t.)**	**Motherwell**	Dingwall
19:45	Schalk 65'; Curran 104' (pen.)	Report	Bigirimana 50'; Cadden 91'; MacLean 112'	Stadium: Victoria Park; Referee: Stephen Finnie

9 August 2017	Hamilton Academical	**0–1**	**Aberdeen**	Hamilton
19:45		Report	McLean 43'	Stadium: New Douglas Park; Attendance: 2,768; Referee: Nick Walsh

9 August 2017	**Dundee**	**2–1**	Dundee United	Dundee
19:45	El Bakhtaoui 30'; McGowan 64'	Report	King 40'	Stadium: Dens Park; Attendance: 10,472; Referee: Steven McLean

=== Quarter-finals ===
==== Draw ====
The quarter-final draw took place at Dens Park following the conclusion of the Dundee–Dundee United match on 9 August, and was shown live on BT Sport 1 & the BT Sport Facebook page. The draw was unseeded and ties were scheduled for the midweek of 19–21 September.

Teams in Bold advanced to the semi-finals.

Premiership	Championship
**Celtic**; **Hibernian**; Partick Thistle; Aberdeen; **Motherwell**; Dundee; **Rangers**	Livingston

==== Matches ====
19 September 2017	**Hibernian**	**3–2**	Livingston	Edinburgh
19:45	Swanson 18'; Boyle 32'; Stokes 83' (pen.)	Report	Lithgow 10'; De Vita 28'	Stadium: Easter Road; Attendance: 8,535; Referee: Bobby Madden

19 September 2017	Partick Thistle	**1–3** (a.e.t.)	**Rangers**	Glasgow
19:45	Doolan 90'	Report	Peña 55'; Candeias 94'; Herrera 99'	Stadium: Firhill Stadium; Attendance: 7,394; Referee: Steven McLean

20 September 2017	Dundee	**0–4**	**Celtic**	Dundee
19:45		Report	Sinclair 25' (pen.); Forrest 42', 90'; McGregor 88'	Stadium: Dens Park; Attendance: 6,917; Referee: John Beaton

21 September 2017	**Motherwell**	**3–0**	Aberdeen	Motherwell
19:45	Moult 13', 85'; Hartley 19'	Report		Stadium: Fir Park; Attendance: 6,430; Referee: Kevin Clancy

=== Semi-finals ===
==== Draw ====
The semi-final draw took place at Fir Park following the conclusion of the Motherwell–Aberdeen match on 21 September, and was shown live on BT Sport 1. The draw was unseeded and ties were scheduled for the weekend of 21/22 October.

Teams in Bold progressed to the final.

Premiership
- **Celtic**
- Hibernian
- **Motherwell**
- Rangers

==== Matches ====
21 October 2017	Hibernian	**2−4**	**Celtic**	Glasgow
12:15	Stokes 59'; Shaw 70'	Report	Lustig 15', 42'; Dembélé 66', 88'	Stadium: Hampden Park; Attendance: 39,813; Referee: Kevin Clancy

22 October 2017	Rangers	**0−2**	**Motherwell**	Glasgow
14:30		Report	Moult 52', 74'	Stadium: Hampden Park; Attendance: 44,506; Referee: Steven McLean

== Final ==
26 November 2017
15:00

Motherwell	0−2	Celtic
	Report	Forrest 49'; Dembélé 60' (pen.)

Hampden Park, Glasgow
Attendance: 49,483
Referee: Craig Thomson

== Top goalscorers ==
There were 324 goals scored in 95 matches in the competition, for an average of 3.41 goals per match.

As of matches played on 26 November 2017

Rank	Player	Club	Goals
1	(Scotland) Simon Murray	Hibernian	8
2	(Scotland) Alan Trouten	Albion Rovers	7
3	(England) Louis Moult	Motherwell	6
4	(Tunisia) Sofien Moussa	Dundee	5
5	(Scotland) Nicky Clark	Dunfermline Athletic	4
5	(Scotland) Sean Winter	East Kilbride	4
5	(Northern Ireland) Kyle Lafferty	Heart of Midlothian	4
5	(Republic of Ireland) Anthony Stokes	Hibernian	4
5	(Scotland) Chris Cadden	Motherwell	4
5	(Scotland) Stephen Dobbie	Queen of the South	4
5	(Scotland) Lewis Vaughan	Raith Rovers	4
5	(England) Craig Curran	Ross County	4

== Media coverage ==
The domestic broadcasting rights for the competition were held exclusively by BT Sport. Prior to the re-format in the 2015–16 season, BBC Scotland had exclusive rights.

The following matches were broadcast live on UK television:

Round	Date	Match
Group Stage	14 July 2017	Ayr United v Kilmarnock
Group Stage	15 July 2017	Queen's Park v Motherwell
Group Stage	21 July 2017	Ross County v Hibernian
Group Stage	22 July 2017	Partick Thistle v St Mirren
Group Stage	29 July 2017	Heart of Midlothian v Dunfermline Athletic
Group Stage	30 July 2017	Dundee v Dundee United
Second Round	9 August 2017	Dundee v Dundee United
Quarter-finals	19 September 2017	Partick Thistle v Rangers
Quarter-finals	20 September 2017	Dundee v Celtic
Quarter-finals	21 September 2017	Motherwell v Aberdeen
Semi-finals	21 October 2017	Hibernian v Celtic
Semi-finals	22 October 2017	Rangers v Motherwell
Final	26 November 2017	Celtic v Motherwell
