= 2017–18 Dunfermline Athletic F.C. season =

Dunfermline Athletic
2017–18 season
- Chairman: Ross McArthur
- Manager: Allan Johnston
- Stadium: East End Park; Dunfermline, Scotland (Capacity: 11,480)
- Championship: Fourth
- Challenge Cup: Third round, lost to Falkirk
- League Cup: Second round, lost to Rangers
- Scottish Cup: Fourth round, lost to Morton
- Top goalscorer: League: Nicky Clark (14); All: Nicky Clark (21)
- Highest home attendance: League: 7,585 vs. Dundee United (30 September 2017); Cup: 2,573 vs. Greenock Morton (20 January 2018)
- Lowest home attendance: League: 2,249 vs. Inverness CT (14 March 2018); Cup: 1,462 vs. Arbroath (15 August 2017)
- Average home league attendance: 5,243 (805)
- Biggest win: League: Dunfermline Athletic 5–1 Inverness CT (12 August 2017); Dumbarton 0–4 Dunfermline Athletic (26 August 2017); Dunfermline Athletic 4–0 Brechin City (14 April 2018); Dunfermline Athletic 4–0 Dumbarton (28 April 2018); Cup: Dunfermline Athletic 6–0 Elgin City (15 July 2017)
- Biggest defeat: League: Dunfermline Athletic 2–5 Queen of the South (9 December 2017); Cup: Rangers 6–0 Dunfermline Athletic (9 August 2017)
Home colours	Away colours
- All statistics correct as of 5 May 2018.

The 2017–18 season was Dunfermline Athletic's second season in the Scottish Championship, having finished 5th in the 2016–17 season.

Having finished the season fourth in the league, the club qualified for the quarter-final stage of the quarter-final stage of the Scottish Premiership play-offs. After a 0–0 draw with Dundee United at East End Park, the Pars lost the second leg 2–1 at Tannadice. Dunfermline also competed in the Scottish Challenge Cup, Scottish League Cup and the Scottish Cup, where they were knocked out by Falkirk, Rangers and Morton, respectively.

== Season review ==
=== May ===
- 5 May 2017: After finishing fifth at the end of the 2016–17 season, manager Allan Johnston opted to offer new deals to the majority of the playing squad. Three first team players who were not offered new deals were Lewis Spence, Euan Spark, and Ben Richards-Everton, the last of which had struggled with injury during the 2016–17 season. Additionally, the club decided that they would not enter a youth side into the 2017–18 SPFL Development League with four youth players being subsequently released. Cammy Gill, Stuart Morrison, Scott Lochhead, Brandon Luke and Callum Smith were all promoted to the first-team.
- 8 May 2017: In the club's end of season address chairman Ross McArthur outlined the club's intentions of reaching a Scottish Premiership play-off place for the 2017–18 season, with a slightly smaller squad of players than in the previous season. Additionally, it was announced that work was due to begin on relaying East End Park's pitch after it was criticised for its condition towards the end of the previous season.
- 17 May 2017: The side completed their first signing of the 2017 summer transfer window, bringing in French defender Jean-Yves Mvoto on a one-year deal. Mvoto, who played most of his career in England, had previously played for Fife rivals Raith Rovers during the previous season.
- 31 May 2017: After the club's previous announcement on player releases, four further first-team players decided to leave East End Park following the end of their contracts. David Hutton, who made just 14 appearances over two season left to sign for recently promoted Scottish League One side Arbroath, whilst club captain Callum Fordyce signed for Championship rivals Queen of the South. Michael Moffat and Andy Geggan both signed for Ayr United, with both players having previously played with the Somerset Park side before playing for Dunfermline. At the time of his departure, Geggan was the longest serving Dunfermline player, having made almost 200 appearances, and was the final member of the squad who went through administration with the Pars in 2013.

=== June ===
- 23 June 2017: The fixtures for the coming SPFL season were released, with the Pars facing off against Scottish League One champions Livingston at Almondvale Stadium. The side's first home match was against recently relegated Inverness Caledonian Thistle, with the third fixture lining Dunfermline up against fierce rivals Falkirk at East End Park.
- 26 June 2017: To celebrate the 50 year anniversary of the club's 1968 Scottish Cup victory, the club launched their replica home kit for the 2017–18 in commemoration of the event.

1968	2017–18

== Squad list ==
As of 4 May 2018, the final match of the season

No.	Name	Nationality	Position	Date of birth (age)	Signed from	Signed in	Signed until	Apps.	Goals
Goalkeepers
1	Sean Murdoch	(Scotland)	GK	31 July 1986 (age 40)	(United States) Rochester Rhinos	2015	2019	114	0
20	Cammy Gill	(Scotland)	GK	7 April 1998 (age 28)	Dunfermline Athletic youth teams	2016	2019	1	0
25	Lee Robinson	(England)	GK	2 July 1986 (age 40)	Queen of the South	2018	2018	21	0
30	Craig Burt	(Scotland)	GK	29 January 2000 (age 26)	AM Soccer	2017	2018	0	0
Defenders
2	Ryan Williamson	(Scotland)	DF	14 March 1996 (age 30)	Dunfermline Athletic youth teams	2013	2019	113	1
3	Lewis Martin	(Scotland)	DF	8 April 1996 (age 30)	Dunfermline Athletic youth teams	2012	2018	129	3
4	Jean-Yves Mvoto	(France)	DF	6 September 1988 (age 38)	Raith Rovers	2017	2018	21	0
5	Callum Morris (c)	(Republic of Ireland)	DF	3 February 1990 (age 36)	Aberdeen	2016	2018	123	7
6	Lee Ashcroft	(Scotland)	DF	29 August 1993 (age 33)	Kilmarnock	2016	2018	89	8
14	Jason Talbot	(England)	DF	30 September 1985 (age 40)	Livingston	2015	2018	109	3
22	Stuart Morrison	(Scotland)	DF	18 April 1999 (age 27)	Dunfermline Athletic youth teams	2016	2019	0	0
Midfielders
7	Kallum Higginbotham	(England)	MF	15 June 1989 (age 37)	Kilmarnock	2016	2018	86	17
8	Nat Wedderburn	(England)	MF	30 June 1991 (age 35)	Inverness Caledonian Thistle	2016	2018	67	1
11	Joe Cardle	(England)	MF	7 February 1987 (age 39)	Ross County	2015	2018	238	54
12	Daniel Armstrong	(Scotland)	MF	11 October 1997 (age 28)	Wolverhampton Wanderers (loan)	2018	2018	6	0
13	Aaron Splaine	(Scotland)	MF	13 October 1996 (age 29)	Kilmarnock	2017	2018	12	0
15	Michael Paton	(Scotland)	MF	25 March 1989 (age 37)	Queen of the South	2015	2018	81	7
17	Fraser Aird	(Canada)	MF	2 February 1995 (age 31)	Falkirk	2017	2018	25	4
18	Conner Duthie	(Scotland)	MF	2 February 1997 (age 29)	Hibernian	2016	2018	7	0
19	Scott Lochhead	(Scotland)	MF	23 January 1997 (age 29)	Dundee United	2016	2018	7	0
21	Brandon Luke	(Scotland)	MF	15 March 1999 (age 27)	Dunfermline Athletic youth teams	2016	2018	0	0
26	James Vincent	(England)	MF	27 September 1989 (age 36)	Dundee (loan)	2018	2018	12	0
27	Dean Shiels	(Northern Ireland)	MF	1 February 1985 (age 41)	(Canada) FC Edmonton	2017	2018	25	0
28	James Craigen	(England)	MF	28 March 1991 (age 35)	Falkirk	2018	2018	18	1
31	Tom Beadling	(Australia)	DF	16 January 1996 (age 30)	(England) Sunderland (loan)	2018	2018	11	1
Forwards
9	Declan McManus	(Scotland)	FW	3 August 1994 (age 32)	(England) Fleetwood Town	2017	2018	44	13
10	Nicky Clark	(Scotland)	FW	3 June 1991 (age 35)	(England) Bury	2016	2018	78	37
16	Andy Ryan	(Scotland)	FW	29 September 1994 (age 31)	Airdrieonians	2017	2019	24	8
23	Callum Smith	(Scotland)	FW	13 November 1999 (age 26)	Fife Elite Football Academy	2016	2020	22	3

== Results & fixtures ==
Win Draw Loss Postponed

=== Pre-season ===
1 July 2017 Closed Doors Friendly	Partick Thistle	4 – 2	Dunfermline Athletic	Glasgow, Scotland
13:00	Lawless 26' (pen.), 61' (pen.); Doolan 73'; Lamont 79'	Match report	Paton 77'; Ďuriš (Note: Trialist) 85'	Stadium: Garscube Sports Complex; Attendance: 0

6 July 2017 Friendly	Dunfermline Athletic	0 – 4	Hibernian	Dunfermline, Scotland
19:45		Match report	Swanson 24'; Pennant (Note: Trialist) 58'; Boyle 71'; Shaw 76'	Stadium: East End Park; Attendance: 2,125; Referee: Clancy

10 July 2017 Friendly	Raith Rovers	3 – 0	Dunfermline Athletic	Kirkcaldy, Scotland
19:45	Buchanan 24'; Vaughan 32'; Matthews 89'	Match report		Stadium: Stark's Park; Attendance: 1,460; Referee: Beaton

=== Scottish Championship ===
5 August 2017 Match 1	Livingston	1 – 1	Dunfermline Athletic	Livingston, Scotland
15:00	Pittman 30'	SPFL report	Higginbotham 63' (pen.)	Stadium: Almondvale Stadium; Attendance: 2,301; Referee: Newlands

12 August 2017 Match 2	Dunfermline Athletic	5 – 1	Inverness Caledonian Thistle	Dunfermline, Scotland
15:00	Smith 2'; Ashcroft 14'; Cardle 41', 90'; Hopkirk 67'	SPFL report	Vigurs 18'	Stadium: East End Park; Attendance: 4,391; Referee: McLean

19 August 2017 Match 3	Dunfermline Athletic	3 – 1	Falkirk	Dunfermline, Scotland
15:00	McManus 5'; Cardle 11', 90+2'	SPFL report	Taiwo 83'; Sibbald (red card) 52'; Miller (red card) 62'	Stadium: East End Park; Attendance: 5,751; Referee: Beaton

26 August 2017 Match 4	Dumbarton	0 – 4	Dunfermline Athletic	Dumbarton, Scotland
15:00	Dowie (yellow card) 77' (red card)	SPFL report	Cardle 5'; Higginbotham 28'; Clark 87'; Ryan 90+1'	Stadium: Dumbarton Football Stadium; Attendance: 1,028; Referee: Cook

9 September 2017 Match 5	Greenock Morton	3 – 2	Dunfermline Athletic	Greenock, Scotland
15:00	Thomson 46'; Harkins 73'; Quitongo 90+3'	SPFL report	Cardle 9'; Higginbotham 33' (pen.)	Stadium: Cappielow; Attendance: 1,918; Referee: Clancy

16 September 2017 Match 6	Dunfermline Athletic	3 – 0	St Mirren	Dunfermline, Scotland
15:00	McManus 20'; Hopkirk 45'; Morris 56'	SPFL report	Eckersley (red card) 87'; Buchanan (yellow card) 88' (yellow-red card)	Stadium: East End Park; Attendance: 6,628; Referee: Thomson

23 September 2017 Match 7	Brechin City	0 – 3	Dunfermline Athletic	Brechin, Scotland
15:00		SPFL report	Ashcroft 28'; McManus 55'; Clark 70'	Stadium: Glebe Park; Attendance: 1,214; Referee: McKendrick

30 September 2017 Match 8	Dunfermline Athletic	1 – 3	Dundee United	Dunfermline, Scotland
15:00	Smith 77'	SPFL report	Fyvie 35', 59'; McDonald 43'	Stadium: East End Park; Attendance: 7,585; Referee: Robertson

14 October 2017 Match 9	Queen of the South	0 – 0	Dunfermline Athletic	Dumfries, Scotland
15:00		SPFL report		Stadium: Palmerston Park; Attendance: 1,834; Referee: Finnie

21 October 2017 Match 10	Dunfermline Athletic	3 – 1	Livingston	Dunfermline, Scotland
15:00	Higginbotham 2', 38'; Aird 30'	SPFL report	Mullen 87'	Stadium: East End Park; Attendance: 5,059; Referee: Dallas

28 October 2017 Match 11	Inverness Caledonian Thistle	1 – 0	Dunfermline Athletic	Inverness, Scotland
15:00	Bell 23'	SPFL report		Stadium: Caledonian Stadium; Attendance: 2,948; Referee: Clancy

4 November 2017 Match 12	Falkirk	1 – 1	Dunfermline Athletic	Falkirk, Scotland
15:00	McGhee 64'	SPFL report	Higginbotham 28' (pen.) (yellow card) 56' (yellow-red card); McManus (yellow card) 90+2' (yellow-red card)	Stadium: Falkirk Stadium; Attendance: 5,465; Referee: Thomson

11 November 2017 Match 13	Dunfermline Athletic	P – P	Greenock Morton	Dunfermline, Scotland
15:00				Stadium: East End Park
Note: _{Match postponed due to international call-ups}

21 November 2017 Match 13 ^{(Rearranged)}	Dunfermline Athletic	1 – 1	Greenock Morton	Dunfermline, Scotland
19:45	Ryan 21'	SPFL report	Oliver 34'	Stadium: East End Park; Attendance: 4,816; Referee: Finnie

25 November 2017 Match 14	Dunfermline Athletic	2 – 2	Dumbarton	Dunfermline, Scotland
15:00	Morris 55'; Clark 88'	SPFL report	Walsh 51'; Froxylias 68'	Stadium: East End Park; Attendance: 4,505; Referee: Walsh

2 December 2017 Match 15	Dundee United	2 – 1	Dunfermline Athletic	Dundee, Scotland
15:00	Fraser 15', 42'	SPFL report	McManus 75' (pen.)	Stadium: Tannadice; Attendance: 5,790; Referee: Anderson

9 December 2017 Match 16	Dunfermline Athletic	2 – 5	Queen of the South	Dunfermline, Scotland
15:00	Clark 46'; McManus 85'	SPFL report	Kane 8', 27'; Dobbie 74', 80' (pen.), 90+1'	Stadium: East End Park; Attendance: 4,694; Referee: Collum

16 December 2017 Match 17	St Mirren	1 – 0	Dunfermline Athletic	Paisley, Scotland
15:00	C. Smith 38'	SPFL report		Stadium: St Mirren Park; Attendance: 3,665; Referee: Charleston

23 December 2017 Match 18	Dunfermline Athletic	2 – 1	Brechin City	Dunfermline, Scotland
15:00	McManus 22'; Paton 49'	SPFL report	McLennan 59'	Stadium: East End Park; Attendance: 4,595; Referee: Aitken

30 December 2017 Match 19	Livingston	P – P	Dunfermline Athletic	Livingston, Scotland
15:00				Stadium: Almondvale Stadium
Note: _{Match postponed due to frozen pitch}

2 January 2018 Match 20	Dunfermline Athletic	2 – 0	Falkirk	Dunfermline, Scotland
15:00	Clark 16'; McManus 51'	SPFL report		Stadium: East End Park; Attendance: 7,140; Referee: Collum

6 January 2018 Match 21	Dumbarton	0 – 1	Dunfermline Athletic	Dumbarton, Scotland
15:00		SPFL report	Cardle 24'	Stadium: Dumbarton Football Stadium; Attendance: 1,086; Referee: Beaton

13 January 2018 Match 22	Dunfermline Athletic	0 – 0	Dundee United	Dunfermline, Scotland
15:00		SPFL report		Stadium: East End Park; Attendance: 7,139; Referee: Madden

26 January 2018 Match 23	Dunfermline Athletic	1 – 2	St Mirren	Dunfermline, Scotland
19:45	Clark 49'	SPFL report	C. Smith 13'; Baird 64'	Stadium: East End Park; Attendance: 5,479; Referee: Beaton

3 February 2018 Match 24	Greenock Morton	2 – 1	Dunfermline Athletic	Greenock, Scotland
15:00	Tidser 37'; Oliver 90'	SPFL report	Beadling 23'	Stadium: Cappielow; Attendance: 1,588; Referee: Duncan

10 February 2018 Match 19 ^{(Rearranged)}	Livingston	0 – 0	Dunfermline Athletic	Livingston, Scotland
15:00	Thompson (red card) 69'	SPFL report		Stadium: Almondvale Stadium; Attendance: 1,579; Referee: Aitken

17 February 2018 Match 25	Dunfermline Athletic	P – P	Inverness Caledonian Thistle	Dunfermline, Scotland
15:00				Stadium: East End Park
Note: _{Match postponed due Inverness' participation in the Scottish Challenge Cup semi-finals}

24 February 2018 Match 26	Queen of the South	0 – 0	Dunfermline Athletic	Dumfries, Scotland
15:00		SPFL report		Stadium: Palmerston Park; Attendance: 1,429; Referee: Robertson

27 February 2018 Match 27	Brechin City	P – P	Dunfermline Athletic	Brechin, Scotland
19:45				Stadium: Glebe Park
Note: _{Match postponed due to snow}

3 March 2018 Match 28	Dunfermline Athletic	P – P	Livingston	Dunfermline, Scotland
15:00				Stadium: East End Park
Note: _{Match postponed due to snow}

6 March 2018 Match 25 ^{(Rearranged)}	Dunfermline Athletic	P – P	Inverness Caledonian Thistle	Dunfermline, Scotland
19:45				Stadium: East End Park
Note: _{Match postponed due to snow}

10 March 2018 Match 29	St Mirren	2 – 0	Dunfermline Athletic	Paisley, Scotland
15:00	Davis 69' (pen.); L. Smith 72'	SPFL report	Talbot (yellow card) 68' (yellow-red card)	Stadium: St Mirren Park; Attendance: 4,240; Referee: Walsh

13 March 2018 Match 25 ^{(Rearranged)}	Dunfermline Athletic	1 – 0	Inverness Caledonian Thistle	Dunfermline, Scotland
19:45	Craigen 6'	SPFL report		Stadium: East End Park; Attendance: 2,249; Referee: Clancy

17 March 2018 Match 30	Dunfermline Athletic	0 – 0	Greenock Morton	Dunfermline, Scotland
15:00		SPFL report		Stadium: East End Park; Attendance: 4,613; Referee: Dallas

20 March 2018 Match 27 ^{(Rearranged)}	Brechin City	0 – 3	Dunfermline Athletic	Brechin, Scotland
19:45		SPFL report	Clark 8', 9', 54'	Stadium: Glebe Park; Attendance: 611; Referee: Cook

24 March 2018 Match 31	Dundee United	1 – 1	Dunfermline Athletic	Dundee, Scotland
15:00	McDonald 55'	SPFL report	Clark 52'	Stadium: Tannadice; Attendance: 5,830; Referee: Anderson

31 March 2018 Match 32	Dunfermline Athletic	3 – 1	Queen of the South	Dunfermline, Scotland
15:00	Clark 33', 38', 90+3'	SPFL report	Marshall 69'	Stadium: East End Park; Attendance: 4,762; Referee: Collum

3 April 2018 Match 28 ^{(Rearranged)}	Dunfermline Athletic	1 – 0	Livingston	Dunfermline, Scotland
19:45	Ashcroft 11'	SPFL report		Stadium: East End Park; Attendance: 4,572; Referee: Finnie

7 April 2018 Match 33	Falkirk	1 – 2	Dunfermline Athletic	Falkirk, Scotland
15:00	Muirhead 79' (pen.)	SPFL report	Higginbotham 24'; Aird 48'	Stadium: Falkirk Stadium; Attendance: 5,784; Referee: Robertson

14 April 2018 Match 34	Dunfermline Athletic	4 – 0	Brechin City	Dunfermline, Scotland
15:00	Ashcroft 2'; Aird 25'; Ryan 72'; Higginbotham 87' (pen.)	SPFL report		Stadium: East End Park; Attendance: 4,898; Referee: McKendrick

21 April 2018 Match 35	Inverness Caledonian Thistle	2 – 2	Dunfermline Athletic	Inverness, Scotland
15:00	Chalmers 16'; Austin 48'	SPFL report	Ryan 13'; Clark 90+5'	Stadium: Caledonian Stadium; Attendance: 3,316; Referee: Finnie

28 April 2018 Match 36	Dunfermline Athletic	4 – 0	Dumbarton	Dunfermline, Scotland
15:00	Higginbotham 18', 25'; Aird 45'; Williamson 65'	SPFL report		Stadium: East End Park; Attendance: 5,506; Referee: Steven

=== Premiership play-offs ===
1 May 2018 Play-offs QF R1	Dunfermline Athletic	0 – 0	Dundee United	Dunfermline, Scotland
19:45	Ashcroft (red card) 55'	SPFL report		Stadium: East End Park; Attendance: 6,474; Referee: Madden

4 May 2018 Play-offs QF R2	Dundee United	2 – 1	Dunfermline Athletic	Dundee, Scotland
19:45	McDonald 57'; Stanton 70'	SPFL report	McManus 14'	Stadium: Tannadice Park; Attendance: 7,994; Referee: Collum

=== Scottish League Cup ===
==== Group stage ====
15 July 2017 Match 1	Dunfermline Athletic	6 – 0	Elgin City	Dunfermline, Scotland
15:00	Clark 10', 20', 35', 46'; Paton 33'; Smith 90'	SPFL report		Stadium: East End Park; Attendance: 1,757; Referee: Munro

18 July 2017 Match 2	East Fife	0 – 0 (8 – 9 p)	Dunfermline Athletic	Methil, Scotland
19:45		SPFL report		Stadium: Bayview Stadium; Attendance: 1,094; Referee: Ross
	Penalties
	Docherty (penalty scored); Willis (penalty scored); Slattery (penalty scored); Duggan (penalty scored); Watson (penalty scored); Mutch (penalty scored); Wilson (penalty scored); Dunsmore (penalty scored); Gordon (penalty missed)		(penalty scored) Shiels; (penalty scored) Paton; (penalty scored) Clark; (penalty scored) Cardle; (penalty scored) Lochhead; (penalty scored) Morris; (penalty scored) Ashcroft; (penalty scored) Williamson; (penalty scored) Smith

22 July 2017 Match 3	Dunfermline Athletic	5 – 1	Peterhead	Dunfermline, Scotland
15:00	McManus 7', 46'; Cardle 12', 22'; Ross 72' (o.g.)	SPFL report	McAllister 63' (pen.)	Stadium: East End Park; Attendance: 1,878; Referee: Madden

29 July 2017 Match 4	Heart of Midlothian	2 – 2 (1 – 3 p)	Dunfermline Athletic	Edinburgh, Scotland
15:00	Cowie 20'; Gonçalves 86'	SPFL report	Cardle 28'; McManus 52'	Stadium: Tynecastle Stadium; Attendance: 8,404; Referee: Thomson
	Penalties
	McGhee (penalty missed); Lafferty (penalty scored); Martin (penalty missed); Cowie (penalty missed)		(penalty scored) Paton; (penalty scored) Lochhead; (penalty missed) McManus; (penalty scored) Wedderburn

==== Knockout phase ====
9 August 2017 Scottish League Cup round 2	Rangers	6 – 0	Dunfermline Athletic	Glasgow, Scotland
19:45	Miller 5'; Alves 9'; Morelos 23', 75'; Tavernier 27'; Candeias 57'	SPFL report		Stadium: Ibrox Stadium; Attendance: 35,262; Referee: Roberston

=== Scottish Challenge Cup ===
15 August 2017 Challenge Cup round 1	Dunfermline Athletic	2 – 0	Arbroath	Dunfermline, Scotland
19:45	Ryan 24', 40'; Duthie (yellow card) 92' (yellow-red card)	SPFL report	Little (red card) 31'	Stadium: East End Park; Attendance: 1,462; Referee: Anderson

2 September 2017 Challenge Cup round 2	Buckie Thistle	0 – 3	Dunfermline Athletic	Buckie, Scotland
15:00		SPFL report	Clark 7', 35'; Ryan 39'	Stadium: Victoria Park; Attendance: 609; Referee: Roncone

7 October 2017 Challenge Cup round 3	Falkirk	2 – 0	Dunfermline Athletic	Falkirk, Scotland
15:00	Balatoni 19'; Hippolyte 59'	SPFL report	Shiels (red card) 90+6'	Stadium: Falkirk Stadium; Attendance: 4,082; Referee: McLean

=== Scottish Cup ===
18 November 2017 Scottish Cup round 3	Queen's Park	1 – 4	Dunfermline Athletic	Glasgow, Scotland
15:00	Galt 65'	BBC Sport report	Clark 48'; Talbot 59'; Ryan 78'; McManus 89'	Stadium: Hampden Park; Attendance: 1,179; Referee: McLean

20 January 2018 Scottish Cup round 4	Dunfermline Athletic	1 – 2	Greenock Morton	Dunfermline, Scotland
15:00	McManus 57'	BBC Sport report	Oliver 24'; Quitongo 85'	Stadium: East End Park; Attendance: 2,573; Referee: Muir

== Squad statistics ==
=== Appearances and goals ===
During the 2017–18 season, Dunfermline used twenty-seven different players in competitive matches. The table below shows the number of appearances and goals scored by each player. Right wing-back Ryan Williamson made the most appearances, playing forty-six out of a possible 48 games; Nicky Clark scored the most goal, with twenty-one in all competitions.

As of 5 May 2018

No.	Pos	Nat	Player	Total		Scottish Championship		Scottish Cup		League Cup		Challenge Cup		Play-offs	
No.	Pos	Nat	Player	Apps	Goals	Apps	Goals	Apps	Goals	Apps	Goals	Apps	Goals	Apps	Goals
1	GK	(Scotland) SCO	Sean Murdoch	27	0	18	0	1	0	5	0	3	0	0	0
2	DF	(Scotland) SCO	Ryan Williamson	46	1	36	1	2	0	5	0	1	0	2	0
3	DF	(Scotland) SCO	Lewis Martin	26	0	13+3	0	0+1	0	5	0	2	0	2	0
4	DF	(France) FRA	Jean-Yves Mvoto	21	0	11+2	0	1	0	0+4	0	1+1	0	0+1	0
5	DF	(Republic of Ireland) IRL	Callum Morris	40	2	28+2	2	2	0	5	0	1	0	2	0
6	DF	(Scotland) SCO	Lee Ashcroft	43	4	33	4	1	0	5	0	2	0	2	0
7	MF	(England) ENG	Kallum Higginbotham	43	10	26+6	10	1+1	0	5	0	1+1	0	2	0
8	MF	(England) ENG	Nat Wedderburn	36	0	23+4	0	2	0	4	0	1+1	0	0+1	0
9	FW	(Scotland) SCO	Declan McManus	44	13	28+4	7	2	2	5	3	1+2	0	1+1	1
10	FW	(Scotland) SCO	Nicky Clark	41	21	31+1	14	2	1	3	4	2	2	2	0
11	MF	(England) ENG	Joe Cardle	34	10	16+9	7	2	0	5	3	1	0	0+1	0
12	MF	(Scotland) SCO	Daniel Armstrong	6	0	1+5	0	0	0	0	0	0	0	0	0
13	MF	(Scotland) SCO	Aaron Splaine	12	0	3+4	0	0+1	0	0+1	0	3	0	0	0
14	DF	(England) ENG	Jason Talbot	31	1	25+1	0	2	1	0	0	2	0	0+1	0
15	MF	(Scotland) SCO	Michael Paton	19	2	8+3	1	1	0	5	1	2	0	0	0
16	FW	(Scotland) SCO	Andy Ryan	24	8	5+14	4	1	1	0	0	2+1	3	1	0
17	DF	(Canada) CAN	Fraser Aird	25	4	11+10	4	0	0	0	0	2	0	2	0
18	MF	(Scotland) SCO	Conner Duthie	1	0	0	0	0	0	0	0	1	0	0	0
19	MF	(Scotland) SCO	Scott Lochhead	7	0	0+1	0	0	0	0+4	0	2	0	0	0
20	GK	(Scotland) SCO	Cammy Gill	1	0	0	0	0	0	0	0	0+1	0	0	0
25	GK	(England) ENG	Lee Robinson	21	0	18	0	1	0	0	0	0	0	2	0
26	MF	(England) ENG	James Vincent	12	0	10	0	0	0	0	0	0	0	2	0
27	MF	(Northern Ireland) NIR	Dean Shiels	25	0	16+3	0	2	0	1+2	0	1	0	0	0
28	MF	(England) ENG	James Craigen	18	1	14+1	1	0+1	0	0	0	0	0	2	0
30	GK	(Scotland) SCO	Craig Burt	0	0	0	0	0	0	0	0	0	0	0	0
31	MF	(Australia) AUS	Tom Beadling	11	1	11	1	0	0	0	0	0	0	0	0
Players away from the club on loan:
21	MF	(Scotland) SCO	Brandon Luke (on loan at Cowdenbeath)	0	0	0	0	0	0	0	0	0	0	0	0
23	FW	(Scotland) SCO	Callum Smith (on loan at Alloa Athletic)	19	3	8+5	2	0	0	1+3	1	1+1	0	0	0
22	DF	(Scotland) SCO	Stuart Morrison (on loan at Edinburgh City)	0	0	0	0	0	0	0	0	0	0	0	0
24	DF	(Scotland) SCO	Paul Allan (on loan at Hill of Beath Hawthorn)	0	0	0	0	0	0	0	0	0	0	0	0
Players who appeared for Dunfermline Athletic but left during the season:
12	FW	(Scotland) SCO	David Hopkirk	10	2	3+5	2	0	0	1	0	1	0	0	0

a. Includes the Scottish Premiership play-offs.

=== Clean sheets ===
No.	Pos	Nat	Name	Total	Scottish Championship	Scottish Cup	Scottish League Cup	Scottish Challenge Cup	Scottish Premiership play-offs
25	GK	(England)	Lee Robinson	12	11				1
1	GK	(Scotland)	Sean Murdoch	8	4		2	2	
Total				20	15	0	2	2	1

Last updated: 3 May 2018
Source: Match reports in Competitive matches

=== Goalscorers ===
During the 2017–18 season, fifteen Dunfermline players scored 84 goals in all competitions, with 1 goal having been an own goal scored by Peterhead defender Scott Ross. Striker Nicky Clark was the club's top scorer, with 21 goals in 48 competitive matches. Clark was the only player to have scored a hat-trick, scoring four in the first competitive fixture of the season against Elgin City and three against Championship opponents Brechin City and Queen of the South.

As of match played 4 May 2018

Place	Position	Nation	Name	Total	Scottish Championship	Scottish Cup	Scottish League Cup	Scottish Challenge Cup	Scottish Premiership play-offs
1	FW	(Scotland)	Nicky Clark	21	14	1	4	2	
2	FW	(Scotland)	Declan McManus	13	7	2	3		1
3	MF	(England)	Kallum Higginbotham	10	10				
3	MF	(Scotland)	Joe Cardle	10	7		3		
5	FW	(Scotland)	Andy Ryan	8	4	1		3	
6	DF	(Scotland)	Lee Ashcroft	4	4				
6	MF	(Canada)	Fraser Aird	4	4				
8	FW	(Scotland)	Callum Smith	3	2		1		
9	DF	(Republic of Ireland)	Callum Morris	2	2				
9	FW	(Scotland)	David Hopkirk	2	2				
9	MF	(Scotland)	Michael Paton	2	1		1		
12	DF	(Scotland)	Ryan Williamson	1	1				
12	MF	(Australia)	Tom Beadling	1	1				
12	MF	(England)	James Craigen	1	1				
12	DF	(England)	Jason Talbot	1		1			
—			Own goal	1			1		
Total				84	60	5	13	5	1

=== Disciplinary record ===
As of match played 4 May 2018

Squad number	Position	Nation	Name	Total		Scottish Championship		Scottish Cup		Scottish League Cup		Scottish Challenge Cup		Scottish Premiership play-offs	
Squad number	Position	Nation	Name	Booked	Sent off (straight red)	Booked	Sent off (straight red)	Booked	Sent off (straight red)	Booked	Sent off (straight red)	Booked	Sent off (straight red)	Booked	Sent off (straight red)
14	DF	(England)	Jason Talbot	7	1	5	1					1		1	
7	MF	(England)	Kallum Higginbotham	6	1	5	1							1	
9	MF	(Scotland)	Declan McManus	5	1	5	1								
6	DF	(Scotland)	Lee Ashcroft	4	1	3				1					1
27	MF	(Northern Ireland)	Dean Shiels	3	1	3							1		
18	DF	(Scotland)	Conner Duthie	1	1							1	1		
5	DF	(Republic of Ireland)	Callum Morris	10		9				1					
11	MF	(England)	Joe Cardle	9		7		1		1					
2	DF	(Scotland)	Ryan Williamson	6		6									
4	DF	(France)	Jean-Yves Mvoto	5		5									
8	MF	(Scotland)	Nat Wedderburn	4		2		1		1					
1	GK	(Scotland)	Sean Murdoch	3		3									
10	MF	(Scotland)	Nicky Clark	3		3									
31	MF	(Australia)	Tom Beadling	3		3									
13	MF	(Scotland)	Aaron Splaine	3		2						1			
25	GK	(England)	Lee Robinson	2		2									
28	MF	(England)	James Craigen	2		2									
3	MF	(Scotland)	Lewis Martin	1		1									
12	DF	(Scotland)	David Hopkirk	1		1									
15	MF	(Scotland)	Michael Paton	1		1									
16	MF	(Scotland)	Andy Ryan	1		1									
17	MF	(Canada)	Fraser Aird	1		1									
26	MF	(England)	James Vincent	1		1									
19	MF	(Scotland)	Scott Lochhead	1						1					
Total				83	6	71	3	2	0	5	0	3	2	2	1

== Club statistics ==
=== League table ===
Pos	Team	Pld	W	D	L	GF	GA	GD	Pts	Promotion, qualification or relegation
2	Livingston (O, P)	36	17	11	8	56	37	+19	62	Qualification for the Premiership play-off semi-final
3	Dundee United	36	18	7	11	52	42	+10	61	Qualification for the Premiership play-off quarter-final
4	Dunfermline Athletic	36	16	11	9	60	35	+25	59	Qualification for the Premiership play-off quarter-final
5	Inverness Caledonian Thistle	36	16	9	11	53	37	+16	57	
6	Queen of the South	36	14	10	12	59	53	+6	52	

Source: Soccerway
Rules for classification: 1) Points; 2) Goal difference; 3) Goals scored; 4) Points in head-to-head matches; 5) Goal difference in hth matches; 6). Goals scored in hth matches; 7). Play-off (only for deciding promotion, play-off participation and relegation).
(O) Play-off winners; (P) Promoted

==== Results by round ====
Round	1	2	3	4	5	6	7	8	9	10	11	12	13	14	15	16	17	18	19	20	21	22	23	24	25	26	27	28	29	30	31	32	33	34	35	36
Ground	A	H	H	A	A	H	A	H	A	H	A	A	H	H	A	H	A	H	H	A	H	H	A	A	A	A	H	H	A	A	H	H	A	H	A	H
Result	D	W	W	W	L	W	W	L	D	W	L	D	D	D	L	L	L	W	W	W	D	L	L	D	D	L	W	D	W	D	W	W	W	W	D	W
Position	4	2	2	1	2	1	1	3	3	2	3	4	3	4	4	5	5	3	4	3	3	4	5	5	5	6	5	5	5	5	4	3	3	3	4	4

Updated to match(es) played on 29 April 2018. Source: DAFC.co.uk
A = Away; H = Home; W = Win; D = Draw; L = Loss

==== Results summary ====
Overall								Home						Away					
Pld	W	D	L	GF	GA	GD	Pts	W	D	L	GF	GA	GD	W	D	L	GF	GA	GD
36	16	11	9	60	35	+25	59	11	4	3	38	18	+20	5	7	6	22	17	+5

Last updated: 29 April 2018.
Source: Scottish Championship

=== League cup table ===
Pos	Team	Pld	W	PW	PL	L	GF	GA	GD	Pts	Qualification	DNF	PET	HOM	EFI	ELG
1	Dunfermline Athletic (Q)	4	2	2	0	0	13	3	+10	10	Qualification for the Second Round	—	5–1	—	—	6–0
2	Peterhead	4	3	0	0	1	7	6	+1	9		—	—	2–1	1–0	—
3	Heart of Midlothian	4	2	0	1	1	7	4	+3	7		2–2p	—	—	3–0	—
4	East Fife	4	1	0	1	2	3	6	−3	4		0–0p	—	—	—	3–2
5	Elgin City	4	0	0	0	4	2	13	−11	0		—	0–3	0–1	—	—

Rules for classification: 1) goal difference, 2) goals scored, 3) away goals scored, 4) matches won, 5) away matches won, 6) drawing of lots.
(Q) Qualified to the phase indicated

=== Home attendances ===
Win Draw Loss

Comp	Date	Score	Opponent	Attendance
League Cup	15 July 2017	6–0	Elgin City	1,757
League Cup	22 July 2017	5–1	Peterhead	1,878
Championship	12 August 2017	5–1	Inverness CT	4,391
Challenge Cup	15 August 2017	2–0	Arbroath	1,462
Championship	19 August 2017	3–1	Falkirk	5,751
Championship	16 September 2017	3–0	St Mirren	6,628
Championship	30 September 2017	1–3	Dundee United	7,585
Championship	21 October 2017	3–1	Livingston	5,089
Championship	21 November 2017	1–1	Greenock Morton	4,816
Championship	25 November 2017	2–2	Dumbarton	4,505
Championship	9 December 2017	2–5	Queen of the South	4,694
Championship	23 December 2017	2–1	Brechin City	4,595
Championship	2 January 2018	2–0	Falkirk	7,140
Championship	13 January 2018	0–0	Dundee United	7,139
Scottish Cup	20 January 2018	1–2	Greenock Morton	2,573
Championship	26 January 2018	1–2	St Mirren	5,479
Championship	13 March 2018	1–0	Inverness CT	2,249
Championship	17 March 2018	0–0	Greenock Morton	4,816
Championship	31 March 2018	3–1	Queen of the South	4,762
Championship	3 April 2018	1–0	Livingston	4,572
Championship	14 April 2018	4–0	Brechin City	4,898
Championship	28 April 2018	4–0	Dumbarton	5,506
Championship	1 May 2018	0–0	Dundee United	6,474
			Average league attendance:	5,243
			Total league attendance:	94,382
			Average total attendance:	4,718
			Total attendance:	108,526

Last updated: 29 April 2018
Source: Match reports in Results

== Awards ==
=== Monthly ===
==== Scottish Championship Manager of the Month ====
Month	Name
August	(Scotland) Allan Johnston

==== Scottish Championship Player of the Month ====
Month	Player
August	(England) Joe Cardle
March	(Scotland) Nicky Clark

==== Club ====
Month	Name
August	(Scotland) Callum Smith
September	(Scotland) Ryan Williamson
October	(England) Jason Talbot
November	(England) Jason Talbot
December	(Northern Ireland) Dean Shiels
January	(France) Jean-Yves Mvoto
February	(Scotland) Declan McManus
March	(Scotland) Nicky Clark

=== End of Season ===
==== PFA Scotland ====
Award	Player
PFA Scotland Scottish Championship Team of the Year	(Scotland) Ryan Williamson

==== Club ====
Award	Player
DAFC Player of the Year	(Scotland) Lee Ashcroft
Player's Player of the Year	(Scotland) Lee Ashcroft
Joe Nelson Young Player of the Year	(Scotland) Callum Smith
Centenary Club Lifeline Player of the Year	(Scotland) Declan McManus
Kincardine Pars Supporters Club Player of the Year	(Scotland) Lee Ashcroft
Young Pars Player of the Year	(Scotland) Declan McManus

== Transfers ==
=== First team ===
==== Players in ====
Date	Position	No.	Nationality	Name	From	Fee	Ref.
8 May 2017	DF	24	(Scotland)	Paul Allan	Fife Elite Football Academy	Free	
17 May 2017	DF	4	(France)	Jean-Yves Mvoto	Raith Rovers	Free	
15 June 2017	FW	9	(Scotland)	Declan McManus	(England) Fleetwood Town	Free	
15 June 2017	MF	13	(Scotland)	Aaron Splaine	Kilmarnock	Free	
17 July 2017	MF	27	(Northern Ireland)	Dean Shiels	(Canada) FC Edmonton	Free	
3 August 2017	DF	17	(Canada)	Fraser Aird	Falkirk	Free	
15 August 2017	FW	16	(Scotland)	Andy Ryan	Airdrieonians	Undisclosed	
17 August 2017	GK	30	(Scotland)	Craig Burt	AM Soccer	Free	
2 January 2018	GK	25	(England)	Lee Robinson	Queen of the South	Free	
19 January 2018	MF	28	(England)	James Craigen	Falkirk	Free	

==== Players out ====
Date	Position	No.	Nationality	Name	To	Fee	Ref.
23 May 2017	FW	9	(Scotland)	Michael Moffat	Ayr United	Free	
23 May 2017	DF	5	(Scotland)	Callum Fordyce	Queen of the South	Free	
25 May 2017	MF	6	(Scotland)	Andy Geggan	Ayr United	Free	
31 May 2017	GK	43	(Scotland)	David Hutton	Arbroath	Free	
31 May 2017	DF	14	(England)	Ben Richards-Everton	(England) Accrington Stanley	Free	
31 May 2017	DF	19	(Scotland)	Euan Spark	Brechin City	Free	
31 May 2017	MF	15	(Scotland)	Lewis Spence	Dundee	Free	
31 May 2017	MF	16	(Scotland)	Rhys McCabe	(Republic of Ireland) Sligo Rovers	Free	
9 November 2017	FW	12	(Scotland)	David Hopkirk	(Republic of Ireland) Derry City	Free	

==== Loans in ====
Date	Position	No.	Nationality	Name	From	Duration	Ref.
29 January 2018	MF	26	(England)	James Vincent	Dundee	End of season	
30 January 2018	DF	31	(Australia)	Tom Beadling	(England) Sunderland	End of season	
31 January 2018	MF	12	(Scotland)	Daniel Armstrong	(England) Wolverhampton Wanderers	End of season	

==== Loans out ====
Date	Position	No.	Nationality	Name	To	Duration	Ref.
11 August 2017	MF	21	(Scotland)	Brandon Luke	Annan Athletic	5 months	
11 August 2017	DF	22	(Scotland)	Stuart Morrison	Edinburgh City	Initially 5 months, extended until end of season	
31 August 2017	DF	24	(Scotland)	Paul Allan	Stenhousemuir	5 months	
27 October 2017	MF	18	(Scotland)	Conner Duthie	Forfar Athletic	3 months	
3 November 2017	MF	19	(Scotland)	Scott Lochhead	Forfar Athletic	3 months	
12 January 2018	DF	24	(Scotland)	Paul Allan	Hill of Beath Hawthorn	End of season	
26 January 2018	MF	21	(Scotland)	Brandon Luke	Cowdenbeath	End of season	

=== Development squad ===
==== Players out ====
Date	Position	No.	Nationality	Name	To	Fee	Ref.
31 May 2017	DF	27	(Scotland)	Reece Duncan	Camelon Juniors	Free	
31 May 2017	MF	29	(Scotland)	Robbie Crawford	Hamilton Academical	Free	
31 May 2017	MF	28	(Scotland)	Johnny Galloway	Burntisland Shipyard	Free	
31 May 2017	MF	25	(Scotland)	Evan Horne	St Mirren	Free	

== Contract extensions ==
Date	Position	Nationality	Name	Length	Expiry	Ref.
27 April 2017	DF	(Scotland)	Stuart Morrison	2 years	2019	
27 April 2017	FW	(Scotland)	Callum Smith	2 years	2019	
4 May 2017	DF	(Scotland)	Lee Ashcroft	1 year	2018	
5 May 2017	MF	(England)	Nat Wedderburn	1 year	2018	
16 May 2017	DF	(Republic of Ireland)	Callum Morris	1 year	2018	
17 May 2017	MF	(England)	Kallum Higginbotham	1 year	2018	
24 May 2017	MF	(Scotland)	Scott Lochhead	1 year	2018	
1 June 2017	MF	(England)	Jason Talbot	1 year	2018	
20 June 2017	GK	(Scotland)	Sean Murdoch	1 year	2019	
29 June 2017	MF	(Scotland)	Michael Paton	1 year	2018	
20 October 2017	FW	(Scotland)	Callum Smith	1 year	2020	
27 October 2017	DF	(Scotland)	Ryan Williamson	1 year	2019	
