= Aaron Splaine =

Scottish footballer (born 1996)

Personal information
- Date of birth: 13 October 1996 (age 30)
- Place of birth: Spain
- Height: 5 ft 8 in (1.73 m)
- Position: Midfielder

Youth career
- 2008–2013: Queen of the
- 2013–2015: Kilmarnock

Senior career*
Years	Team	Apps	(Gls)
2015–2016	Kilmarnock	8	(0)
2017–2018	Dunfermline Athletic	7	(0)
2018	Derry City	11	(1)
2019–2020	Europa Point	34	(16)
2020	Bruno's 23 Magpies	46	(22)
2020–2021	Annan Athletic	9	(0)
2021–2022	Clyde	30	(2)
- * Club domestic league appearances and goals as of 22:33, 8 May 2022 (UTC)

Aaron Splaine (born 13 October 1996) is a Scottish professional footballer who most recently played as a midfielder for Clyde. He started his career as a youth player for Queen of the South and also played for Kilmarnock, Dunfermline Athletic, Annan Athletic, Northern Irish side Derry City and Gibraltarian clubs Europa Point and Bruno's Magpies.

== Career ==
Born in Spain, Splaine was brought up in Newton Stewart and joined local side Queen of the South at youth level. Splaine spent five years at Palmerston Park, before following the Doonhamers manager Allan Johnston to Kilmarnock when he took over as manager in 2013.

Splaine made his debut in the penultimate Scottish Premiership match of the 2014–15 season, against Ross County at Rugby Park. Although Kilmarnock lost the match 1–2, Splaine was praised for the composed way that he operated in midfield, with BBC Scotland correspondent Kenny Crawford describing him as looking like a "seasoned professional". Splaine went on to make a further eight appearances for the club, before being released on 23 May 2016 along with five other players at the end of their contract.

After six months away from football, Splaine subsequently had trials with Leeds United and Burnley, before signing a one-year deal with Scottish Championship club Dunfermline Athletic on 15 June 2017, joining up with former Doonhamers and Killie manager Allan Johnston. Splaine started the season in-and-out of the first team, making his full league debut for the club versus Queen of the South in October. Splaine suffered a season ending leg-break in a Fife Cup match against Burntisland Shipyard in November 2017, and was released by the club in May 2018, following the end of his contract.

After leaving Dunfermline, Splaine joined former Pars teammate Dean Shiels in signing for side Derry City. Splaine scored on his debut for the club, in a 2–1 victory over Limerick. He left the club at the end of the 2018 season. In August 2019, Splaine joined Europa Point in Gibraltar. He made his debut on 21 August in a 5–0 defeat to Lynx.

After a spell with Bruno's Magpies, Splaine returned to Scottish football in August 2020 with Annan Athletic. In June 2021, Splaine moved up a division to sign for Scottish League One club Clyde.

== Career statistics ==
As of match played 16 April 2022

Appearances and goals by club, season and competition
Club	Season	League			FA Cup		League Cup		Other		Total	
Club	Season	Division	Apps	Goals	Apps	Goals	Apps	Goals	Apps	Goals	Apps	Goals
Kilmarnock	2014–15	Scottish Premiership	1	0	0	0	0	0	0	0	1	0
Kilmarnock	2015–16	Scottish Premiership	7	0	0	0	1	0	0	0	8	0
Kilmarnock	Total		8	0	0	0	1	0	0	0	9	0
Dunfermline Athletic	2017–18	Scottish Championship	7	0	1	0	1	0	3	0	12	0
Derry City	2018	Premier Division	11	1	0	0	0	0	0	0	11	1
Annan Athletic	2020–21	Scottish League Two	9	0	0	0	3	0	0	0	12	0
Clyde	2021–22	Scottish League One	30	2	1	0	4	0	1	0	36	2
Career total			65	3	2	0	9	0	4	0	80	3
