= Scott Lochhead =

Scottish footballer

Personal information
- Date of birth: 23 January 1997 (age 29)
- Place of birth: Glasgow, Scotland
- Position: Midfielder

Team information
- Current team: Oakleigh Cannons

Youth career
- 2005–2012: Rangers
- 2012–2014: Celtic
- 2014–2016: Dundee United
- 2016–2017: Dunfermline Athletic

Senior career*
Years	Team	Apps	(Gls)
2016–2018	Dunfermline Athletic	1	(0)
2017	→ Clyde (loan)	4	(0)
2019–2020	Bentleigh Greens		
2021	Pascoe Vale	13	(8)
2022	Oakleigh Cannons	10	(1)
2022–	Dandenong Thunder	31	(7)
- * Club domestic league appearances and goals as of 9 November 2022

Scott Lochhead (born 23 January 1997) is a Scottish professional footballer, who plays as a midfielder for Australian cub Bentleigh Greens. Lochhead has previously played for Dunfermline Athletic, as well as Clyde and Forfar Athletic on loan.

== Career ==
Lochhead began his career as a youth player with both Rangers and Celtic, before joining Dundee United in August 2014. After spending a year and a half at Tannadice, Lochhead left United on 11 January 2016. After six months without a club, Lochhead signed a short-term deal with recently promoted Scottish Championship club Dunfermline Athletic on 29 July 2016, after appearing as a trialist in a number of matches for the side.

His first appearance in a Dunfermline shirt came two days later, in a Scottish League Cup match against his former side Dundee United, where he came on as a 93rd-minute substitute for James Thomas. Lochhead subsequently signed contract extensions with the Pars in November 2016 and May 2017, keeping him at the club until May 2017 and 2018 respectively. On 31 January 2017, Lochhead moved on a development loan to Scottish League Two club Clyde until the end of the 2016–17 season, where he made 4 appearances.

Lochhead started the 2017–18 well for the Pars, making a number of first-team appearances before joining Scottish League One side Forfar Athletic on a short-term loan on 3 November 2017 After just 8 first team appearances, Lochhead left Dunfermline in May 2018. He joined National Premier Leagues Victoria club Bentleigh Greens in February 2019.

== Career statistics ==
As of 11 February 2018

Club	Season	League			FA Cup		League Cup		Other		Total	
Club	Season	Division	Apps	Goals	Apps	Goals	Apps	Goals	Apps	Goals	Apps	Goals
Dunfermline Athletic	2016–17	Scottish Championship	0	0	0	0	1	0	0	0	1	0
Dunfermline Athletic	2017–18	Scottish Championship	1	0	0	0	4	0	2	0	7	0
Dunfermline Athletic	Total		1	0	0	0	5	0	2	0	8	0
Clyde (loan)	2016–17	Scottish League Two	4	0	0	0	0	0	0	0	4	0
Forfar Athletic (loan)	2017–18	Scottish League One	7	0	1	0	0	0	0	0	8	0
Career total			12	0	1	0	5	0	2	0	20	0
