= Sofien Moussa =

Tunisian footballer

Personal information
- Date of birth: 6 February 1988 (age 38)
- Place of birth: La Marsa, Tunisia
- Height: 1.89 m (6 ft 2 in)
- Position: Striker

Senior career*
Years	Team	Apps	(Gls)
2010–2014	AS Marsa	60	(5)
2014–2015	Étoile du Sahel	16	(2)
2015–2016	Petrolul Ploiești	17	(3)
2016	Tromsø	20	(5)
2017	Lokomotiv GO	12	(2)
2017–2019	Dundee	35	(7)
2019	Concordia Chiajna	13	(3)
2019	Botoșani	10	(1)
2020	Academica Clinceni	5	(0)
Total		188	(28)
- * Club domestic league appearances and goals

Sofien Moussa (Arabic: سفيان موسى; born 6 February 1988) is a Tunisian former professional footballer who played as a striker. He played for such teams as Étoile Sportive du Sahel, Petrolul Ploiești, Tromsø, Dundee, and Academica Clinceni.

== Career ==
=== AS Marsa ===
Moussa started his career at age 22 at hometown club AS Marsa where he spent four years playing in Tunisian Ligue Professionnelle 2.

=== Étoile du Sahel ===
At the end of the 2014 season he move up a division to Tunisian Ligue Professionnelle 1 to join one of the top clubs in Tunisian football, Étoile du Sahel. However, Moussa struggled for form and on holding down a place in the team only making 16 appearances for Étoile du Sahel and only scoring 2 goals in the 2014–15 campaign.

=== Petrolul Ploiești ===
Moussa arrived at his first European club, Petrolul Ploiești at the start of the 2015–16 Liga I season. Moussa played about half a season in Romania. He moved to Norway during the 2015 Norwegian transfer window.

=== Tromsø ===
In February 2015, Moussa signed a one-year contract with Norwegian Eliteserien side Tromsø. He left the club at the end of his contract.

=== Lokomotiv GO ===
Moussa moved to Lokomotiv Gorna Oryahovitsa in the Bulgarian Top Division for a six-month stint following being released by Tromsø, midway through his first season in Norway. Lokomotiv GO were relegated to the Bulgaria Second Division at the end of the season.

=== Dundee ===
On 14 July 2017, Moussa signed a two-year deal with Scottish Premiership side Dundee. On 18 July, he made his debut for Dundee scoring against Raith Rovers in a 2–1 victory in the group stage of the Scottish League Cup. He started the season with five goals in five games for Dundee in the League Cup group stages including a hat-trick against Cowdenbeath. After returning from a knee operation Moussa scored his first league goal for the club in a 3–2 victory over St Johnstone.

Later on that season, Moussa scored his first brace for Dundee in a 2–1 win against St Johnstone, in their first bottom six fixture. On 31 January 2019, Moussa left Dundee by mutual consent. Moussa has remained a cult figure at the club since his departure due to his hot start and many moments of ineptitude on the pitch thereafter, along with his winning smile.

=== Concordia Chiajna ===
On 19 February 2019, Moussa signed a contract with Liga I side Concordia Chiajna.

=== Academica Clinceni ===
On 18 January 2020, Moussa joined Romanian club Academica Clinceni.

== Career statistics ==
As of match played 24 November 2018

Appearances and goals by club, season and competition
Club	Season	League			National cup		League cup		Continental		Total	
Club	Season	Division	Apps	Goals	Apps	Goals	Apps	Goals	Apps	Goals	Apps	Goals
Marsa	2010–11	Tunisian Ligue Professionnelle 1	19	1			–		–		16	2
Marsa	2011–12	Tunisian Ligue Professionnelle 1	20	2			–		–		16	2
Marsa	2012–13	Tunisian Ligue Professionnelle 1	3	0			–		–		16	2
Marsa	2013–14	Tunisian Ligue Professionnelle 1	18	2			–		–		16	2
Marsa	Total		60	5			0	0	0	0	60	5
Étoile du Sahel	2014–15	CLP-1	16	2			–				16	2
Petrolul Ploiești	2015–16	Liga I	17	3	1	0	1	0	–		19	3
Tromsø	2016	Tippeligaen	20	5	4	2	–		–		24	7
Lokomotiv GO	2016–17	First Professional Football League	12	2	0	0	–		–		12	2
Dundee	2017–18	Scottish Premiership	26	7	3	1	4	5	–		33	13
Dundee	2018–19	Scottish Premiership	9	0	0	0	4	2	–		13	2
Dundee	Total		35	7	3	1	8	7	0	0	46	15
Career total			160	24	8	3	9	7	0	0	177	35

== Honours ==
Étoile du Sahel

- Tunisian League: Runner-up 2014–15
