= Anton Brady =

Scottish footballer

Personal information
- Date of birth: 7 February 1994 (age 32)
- Place of birth: Bellshill, Scotland
- Height: 1.78 m (5 ft 10 in)
- Position: Midfielder

Team information
- Current team: St Cadoc's

Youth career
- 1999–2004: Glenboig United
- 2004–2005: Aberdeen
- 2005–2010: Victoria Boys' Club
- 2010–2012: St Mirren

Senior career*
Years	Team	Apps	(Gls)
2012–2014	St Mirren	2	(0)
2014–2016	East Kilbride		
2016–2018	Queen's Park	25	(3)
2018–2021	East Kilbride		
2021–2023	Stranraer	57	(2)
2023–	St Cadoc's		
- * Club domestic league appearances and goals as of 6 May 2023

Anton Brady (born 7 February 1994) is a Scottish footballer who plays for West of Scotland League Premier Division side St Cadoc's as a midfielder.

== Career ==
Brady played youth football for Glenboig United, Aberdeen and Victoria Boys' Club, before joining St Mirren at the age of 16. He spent two seasons with East Kilbride, before signing for Queen's Park in June 2016. After another spell with East Kilbride, he signed for Stranraer in September 2021.

== Career statistics ==
As of 12 March 2017

Club	Season	League		Scottish Cup		League Cup		Other		Total	
Club	Season	Apps	Goals	Apps	Goals	Apps	Goals	Apps	Goals	Apps	Goals
St Mirren	2012–13	1	0	0	0	0	0	0	0	1	0
St Mirren	2013–15	1	0	1	0	0	0	0	0	2	0
St Mirren	Total	2	0	1	0	0	0	0	0	3	0
Queen's Park	2016–17	25	3	3	0	3	0	2	0	33	3
Career total		27	3	4	0	3	0	2	0	36	3

== Honours ==
East Kilbride

- Lowland League Cup: 2014–15; 2015–16
- East of Scotland Qualifying Cup: 2015–16
- East of Scotland City Cup: 2015–16
