= 2016–17 Highland Football League =

Press & Journal Highland League
- Season: 2016–17
- Champions: Buckie Thistle
- Matches: 306
- Goals: 1,250 (4.08 per match)
- Biggest home win: Buckie Thistle 9–0 Strathspey Thistle
- Biggest away win: Rothes 0–9 Wick Academy
- Highest scoring: Deveronvale 2–9 Buckie Thistle; Fort William 3–8 Wick Academy; Nairn County 3–8 Buckie Thistle; Strathspey Thistle 2–9 Buckie Thistle
- Longest winning run: Buckie Thistle (10)
- Longest unbeaten run: Cove Rangers (13)
- Longest winless run: Fort William (16)
- Longest losing run: Fort William (8); Strathspey Thistle (8)

The 2016–17 Highland Football League started in July 2016 and ended on 22 April 2017.

For promotion to Scottish League Two, the league champions playoff with the Lowland Football League champions (or other eligible team from outside the SPFL to be nominated by the Scottish FA), with the winner then playing the team finishing 10th and bottom in Scottish League Two in a promotion and relegation playoff to determine the entrants for the 2017–18 League Two season.

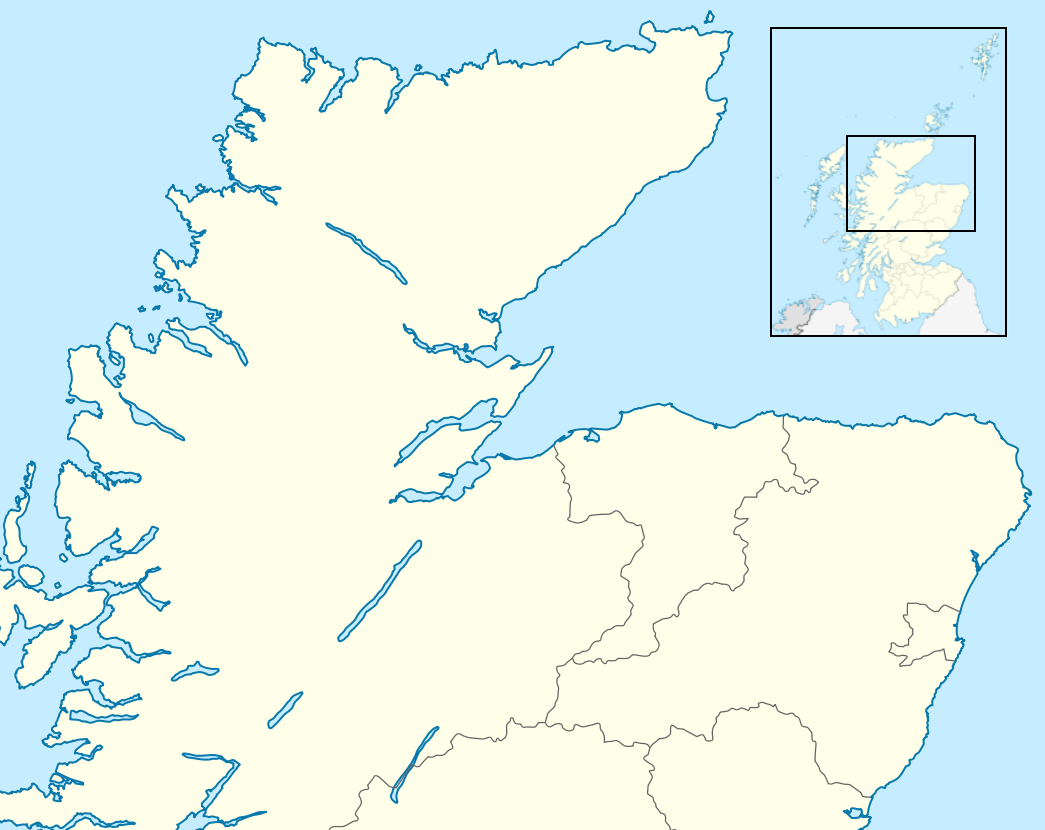
Location of teams in 2016–17 Highland Football League

== League table ==
Pos	Team	Pld	W	D	L	GF	GA	GD	Pts	Promotion or qualification
1	Buckie Thistle (C)	34	26	4	4	130	36	+94	82	Qualification to League Two play-off semi-finals
2	Cove Rangers	34	25	7	2	109	30	+79	82	
3	Brora Rangers	34	26	3	5	116	36	+80	81	
4	Formartine United	34	22	7	5	82	47	+35	73	
5	Fraserburgh	34	19	6	9	77	48	+29	63	
6	Forres Mechanics	34	17	7	10	84	63	+21	58	
7	Turriff United	34	18	4	12	56	42	+14	58	
8	Wick Academy	34	15	8	11	75	52	+23	53	
9	Inverurie Loco Works	34	14	8	12	71	53	+18	50	
10	Keith	34	15	2	17	74	88	−14	47	
11	Clachnacuddin	34	11	8	15	53	77	−24	41	
12	Lossiemouth	34	11	5	18	52	70	−18	38	
13	Nairn County	34	9	7	18	57	74	−17	34	
14	Huntly	34	9	7	18	54	97	−43	34	
15	Deveronvale	34	9	3	22	51	75	−24	30	
16	Rothes	34	7	5	22	37	106	−69	26	
17	Fort William	34	3	2	29	44	136	−92	11	
18	Strathspey Thistle	34	2	3	29	28	120	−92	9	

Source: Highland Football League
Rules for classification: 1) Points; 2) Goal difference; 3) Number of goals scored
(C) Champions

== Results ==
Home \ Away	BROR	BUCK	CLAC	COVE	DEVE	FORM	FORR	FORT	FRAS	HUNT	LOCO	KEITH	LOSS	NAIRN	ROTH	STRA	TURR	WICK
Brora Rangers		2–1	6–0	1–2	6–2	5–0	3–0	8–0	2–0	2–0	2–2	6–0	7–0	3–3	5–0	4–3	2–1	2–0
Buckie Thistle	5–0		4–0	1–0	3–0	3–1	3–0	4–2	1–1	7–0	3–1	6–0	6–0	2–1	3–0	9–0	4–0	1–0
Clachnacuddin	0–5	1–5		2–2	2–1	0–2	2–4	2–2	3–2	1–1	2–0	1–2	2–0	1–0	2–1	0–2	0–0	0–0
Cove Rangers	2–1	2–3	3–2		2–0	5–1	3–2	7–0	2–2	6–0	3–0	3–0	5–0	2–1	5–0	4–0	0–0	6–0
Deveronvale	1–2	2–9	5–1	0–2		2–3	0–2	4–2	1–2	0–2	0–3	3–2	0–0	2–2	5–0	7–2	0–1	0–2
Formartine United	1–4	0–0	2–1	1–1	1–0		2–2	4–2	4–0	8–0	2–1	5–2	1–0	2–0	6–1	2–1	3–2	0–3
Forres Mechanics	1–2	3–2	2–2	0–3	2–1	0–0		4–0	0–2	2–1	1–1	4–1	4–2	7–1	1–1	2–0	1–4	3–5
Fort William	1–5	2–5	0–5	2–6	1–2	1–1	2–6		0–3	2–5	1–4	2–3	1–4	1–2	3–5	4–1	3–2	3–8
Fraserburgh	2–0	2–5	3–3	2–2	3–0	0–1	2–3	3–2		2–0	1–0	1–3	0–4	3–3	2–1	3–0	3–0	1–1
Huntly	1–6	1–0	0–2	0–8	5–2	3–3	0–3	5–1	2–4		2–1	2–1	0–0	4–6	2–1	2–2	2–4	1–5
Inverurie Loco Works	2–2	1–1	4–1	2–3	2–0	1–2	4–3	3–0	1–5	2–1		3–3	2–2	1–0	6–0	3–0	0–2	1–3
Keith	1–4	3–2	6–1	0–3	4–0	1–4	3–2	7–2	2–6	4–1	1–6		4–1	0–1	2–1	5–2	1–0	2–1
Lossiemouth	4–1	2–5	2–3	1–6	0–2	1–3	1–2	5–0	1–2	2–2	1–0	4–1		0–0	1–2	4–1	2–0	1–2
Nairn County	0–4	3–8	1–2	2–5	1–2	0–2	4–4	5–0	0–2	2–1	2–3	1–1	2–1		3–0	0–2	1–2	1–2
Rothes	0–6	1–6	2–2	0–1	2–1	1–5	0–5	2–1	0–5	2–2	2–2	4–2	0–2	0–2		4–2	1–4	0–9
Strathspey Thistle	0–5	2–9	1–4	1–1	0–3	1–6	1–3	0–1	0–7	0–2	1–7	0–4	1–2	2–2	0–1		0–2	0–3
Turriff United	0–1	2–2	4–2	1–1	2–1	1–2	3–4	4–0	1–0	2–0	0–1	3–2	2–0	2–0	2–1	2–0		1–0
Wick Academy	1–2	1–2	3–1	2–3	2–2	2–2	2–2	2–0	0–1	4–4	1–1	3–1	1–2	1–5	1–1	3–0	2–0	

Updated to match(es) played on 22 April 2017. Source: highlandfootballleague.com
Legend: Blue = home team win; Yellow = draw; Red = away team win.

== Promotion play-offs ==
Buckie Thistle qualified for the Play-offs after a 9–0 win against Strathspey Thistle on 22 April 2017 secured them the Highland Football League title for the 11th time.

As Highland League champions, Buckie Thistle played East Kilbride, champions of the 2016–17 Lowland League, over two legs. Buckie Thistle drew the first leg at home 2–2 and lost 2–1 away, losing 3–4 on aggregate. Therefore, Buckie Thistle will remain in the Highland League for the 2017–18 season.
