= 2016–17 Lowland Football League =

Lowland League
- Season: 2016–17
- Champions: East Kilbride
- Relegated: Preston Athletic
- Matches: 240
- Goals: 875 (3.65 per match)
- Top goalscorer: David Grant (East Stirlingshire) (35 goals)
- Biggest home win: The Spartans 9–1 Hawick Royal Albert (29 October 2016)
- Biggest away win: Gala Fairydean Rovers 1–10 East Stirlingshire (3 December 2016)
- Highest scoring: Civil Service Strollers 3–8 East Stirlingshire (27 August 2016); Selkirk 7–4 East Stirlingshire (17 September 2016); BSC Glasgow 8–3 Preston Athletic (26 November 2016); Gala Fairydean Rovers 1–10 East Stirlingshire (3 December 2016)
- Longest winning run: 14 matches: East Kilbride
- Longest unbeaten run: 14 matches: East Kilbride
- Longest winless run: 7 matches: Preston Athletic
- Longest losing run: 6 matches: Preston Athletic & Selkirk
- All statistics correct as of 1 April 2017.

The 2016–17 Scottish Lowland Football League (known as the Ferrari Packaging Lowland League for sponsorship reasons) was the fourth season of the Lowland Football League, the fifth tier of the Scottish football pyramid system. Edinburgh City were the defending champions but could not defend their title after being promoted to Scottish League Two.

East Stirlingshire became the first club to join the league via relegation from the SPFL, having lost the League Two play-off against Edinburgh City. Threave Rovers declined the opportunity to re-apply for membership following their bottom place finish the previous season and instead rejoined the South of Scotland Football League. Hawick Royal Albert and Civil Service Strollers joined the league from the East of Scotland Football League to bring the number of clubs to 16 for the first time.

The league was won with two matches still to play by East Kilbride on 1 April 2017 after they defeated Gala Fairydean Rovers 6–1. East Kilbride defeated the winners of the 2016–17 Highland Football League (Buckie Thistle) in the League Two play-offs semi-finals, but lost to Cowdenbeath on penalties in the final.

== Teams ==
Location of teams in 2016–17 Scottish Lowland Football League

The following teams have changed division since the 2015–16 season.

=== To Lowland League ===
Transferred from East of Scotland League

- Civil Service Strollers
- Hawick Royal Albert

Relegated from League Two

- East Stirlingshire

=== From Lowland League ===
Promoted to League Two

- Edinburgh City

Relegated to South of Scotland League

- Threave Rovers

Team	Location	Stadium	Capacity	Seats	Floodlit
BSC Glasgow	Glasgow	Lochburn Park	1,800	205	Yes
Civil Service Strollers	Edinburgh	Christie Gillies Park	1,569	TBC	No
Cumbernauld Colts	Cumbernauld	Broadwood Stadium	7,936	7,936	Yes
Dalbeattie Star	Dalbeattie	Islecroft Stadium	4,000	250	Yes
East Kilbride	East Kilbride	K Park	660	400	Yes
East Stirlingshire	Stenhousemuir	Ochilview Park	3,746	626	Yes
Edinburgh University	Edinburgh	New Peffermill Stadium	1,100	100	Yes
Gala Fairydean Rovers	Galashiels	3G Arena, Netherdale	5,500	495	Yes
Gretna 2008	Gretna	Raydale Park	3,000	1,318	Yes
Hawick Royal Albert	Hawick	Albert Park	1,000	500	Yes
Preston Athletic	Prestonpans	Pennypit Park	4,000	313	Yes
Selkirk	Selkirk	Yarrow Park	1,000	100	to be
The Spartans	Edinburgh	Ainslie Park	3,000	504	Yes
Stirling University	Stirling	Forthbank Stadium	3,808	2,508	Yes
Vale of Leithen	Innerleithen	Victoria Park	1,500	0	No
Whitehill Welfare	Rosewell	Ferguson Park	4,000	150	No

== League table ==
Pos	Team	Pld	W	D	L	GF	GA	GD	Pts	Promotion, qualification or relegation
1	East Kilbride (C)	30	24	3	3	89	21	+68	75	Qualification for the League Two play-off semi-finals
2	East Stirlingshire	30	21	5	4	107	43	+64	68	
3	The Spartans	30	17	5	8	69	30	+39	56	
4	Stirling University	30	16	5	9	60	53	+7	53	
5	Dalbeattie Star	30	14	5	11	60	50	+10	47	
6	Cumbernauld Colts	30	13	8	9	51	43	+8	47	
7	BSC Glasgow	30	12	6	12	63	56	+7	42	
8	Whitehill Welfare	30	13	1	16	53	64	−11	40	
9	Gretna 2008	30	12	4	14	44	65	−21	40	
10	Gala Fairydean Rovers	30	11	7	12	55	77	−22	40	
11	Edinburgh University	30	10	7	13	40	42	−2	37	
12	Civil Service Strollers	30	10	7	13	59	68	−9	37	
13	Vale of Leithen	30	11	4	15	52	66	−14	37	
14	Hawick Royal Albert	30	8	1	21	58	93	−35	25	
15	Selkirk	30	6	5	19	58	86	−28	23	
16	Preston Athletic (R)	30	5	1	24	41	102	−61	16	Relegation to the East of Scotland League

Source: Soccerway
Rules for classification: 1) Points; 2) Goal difference; 3) Number of goals scored
(C) Champions; (R) Relegated

== Results ==
Home \ Away	BSC	CSS	CUM	DBS	EKB	EST	EDU	GFR	G08	HRA	PRA	SEL	SPA	SLU	VOL	WHW
BSC Glasgow		2–1	1–1	2–3	1–1	0–6	0–0	2–3	2–0	3–1	8–3	1–1	1–2	4–1	2–0	3–0
Civil Service Strollers	3–1		1–1	4–2	1–1	3–8	2–1	3–3	1–2	0–5	3–1	5–2	2–2	1–2	2–4	0–2
Cumbernauld Colts	4–3	1–0		3–0	0–2	3–3	2–0	1–1	1–3	1–1	5–0	1–2	2–0	0–3	1–3	2–1
Dalbeattie Star	3–2	2–2	2–0		0–3	2–2	1–2	2–0	1–3	7–1	2–3	5–1	4–3	0–1	2–0	2–0
East Kilbride	3–1	4–0	0–1	3–0		1–0	2–0	3–1	3–0	2–1	4–0	6–0	2–0	5–0	4–2	4–1
East Stirlingshire	3–0	3–3	4–1	2–1	3–2		1–1	3–0	5–0	3–1	6–2	5–0	1–4	4–1	2–2	3–0
Edinburgh University	1–3	0–0	2–0	0–1	0–4	0–1		0–1	3–4	2–1	4–0	3–2	0–0	1–3	1–1	2–0
Gala Fairydean Rovers	2–1	3–2	2–2	2–4	1–6	1–10	1–3		1–0	5–1	3–1	1–1	3–2	2–2	4–2	2–3
Gretna 2008	1–3	0–4	1–1	1–0	1–5	0–3	0–0	1–1		2–0	5–3	1–1	0–3	0–3	3–0	3–1
Hawick Royal Albert	2–3	2–5	4–3	2–4	2–4	2–4	4–3	4–1	1–3		3–0	4–3	0–4	0–1	3–1	2–3
Preston Athletic	1–1	3–4	0–2	1–4	0–5	1–7	0–3	3–4	1–2	2–1		3–2	0–2	4–3	0–3	0–2
Selkirk	4–0	1–3	1–3	3–1	2–2	7–4	2–3	7–1	1–2	0–3	0–3		0–6	2–4	6–0	2–4
The Spartans	2–1	3–1	0–1	1–2	1–0	1–0	1–1	1–1	4–1	9–1	2–1	3–0		0–1	2–2	2–0
Stirling University	1–1	2–1	2–2	0–0	1–3	0–2	1–0	1–0	4–2	7–2	5–3	3–3	0–3		0–4	3–0
Vale of Leithen	2–6	1–2	1–2	1–1	1–2	2–4	1–0	2–3	3–1	4–3	3–1	2–1	1–6	0–1		2–1
Whitehill Welfare	1–5	4–0	0–3	2–2	0–3	2–5	1–3	5–3	5–1	3–1	4–1	3–1	1–0	4–0	0–2	

Source: SLFL
Legend: Blue = home team win; Yellow = draw; Red = away team win.

== Lowland League play-off ==
A play-off was due to take place between the winners of the 2016–17 East of Scotland Football League (Lothian Thistle Hutchison Vale) and the 2016–17 South of Scotland Football League (Edusport Academy). However Lothian Thistle Hutchison Vale did not meet the required licensing criteria therefore Edusport Academy were promoted automatically to replace Preston Athletic.
