= 2016–17 Scottish League Two =

Scottish League Two
- Season: 2016–17
- Champions: Arbroath
- Promoted: Arbroath; Forfar Athletic
- Matches: 180
- Goals: 531 (2.95 per match)
- Top goalscorer: Shane Sutherland (18 goals)
- Biggest home win: Elgin City 6–0 Berwick Rangers (10 December 2016)
- Biggest away win: Montrose 0–5 Elgin City (15 October 2016)
- Highest scoring: Arbroath 5–3 Stirling Albion (27 August 2016); Clyde 5–3 Cowdenbeath (27 August 2016)
- Longest winning run: 7 matches: Forfar Athletic
- Longest unbeaten run: 10 matches: Forfar Athletic
- Longest winless run: 14 matches: Clyde
- Longest losing run: 7 matches: Cowdenbeath
- Highest attendance: 1,748; Arbroath 1–1 Stirling Albion (6 May 2017)
- Lowest attendance: 241; Annan Athletic 2–0 Cowdenbeath (10 December 2016)
- Total attendance: 96,248
- Average attendance: 537 (18)
- All statistics correct as of 7 May 2017.

The 2016–17 Scottish League Two (known as Ladbrokes League Two for sponsorship reasons) was the 23rd season in the current format of 10 teams in the fourth-tier of Scottish football. The last placed team (Cowdenbeath) entered a play-off with a team nominated by the Scottish Football Association from outside the SPFL (East Kilbride), to determine which team entered League Two in the 2017–18 season. The fixtures were published on 17 June 2016.

Ten teams contested the league: Annan Athletic, Arbroath, Berwick Rangers, Clyde, Cowdenbeath, Edinburgh City, Elgin City, Forfar Athletic, Montrose and Stirling Albion. Arbroath won the league and were promoted, while Forfar were also promoted via the League One play-offs.

== Teams ==
The following teams changed division since the 2015–16 season.

=== To League Two ===
Promoted from Lowland Football League

- Edinburgh City

Relegated from Scottish League One

- Forfar Athletic
- Cowdenbeath

=== From League Two ===
Relegated to Lowland Football League

- East Stirlingshire

Promoted to Scottish League One

- East Fife
- Queen's Park

=== Stadia and locations ===
Annan Athletic	Arbroath	Berwick Rangers	Clyde
Galabank	Gayfield Park	Shielfield Park	Broadwood Stadium
Capacity: 2,504	Capacity: 6,600	Capacity: 4,099	Capacity: 8,086
Cowdenbeath	2016–17 Scottish League Two (Scotland)		Edinburgh City
Central Park	2016–17 Scottish League Two (Scotland)		Meadowbank Stadium
Capacity: 4,309	2016–17 Scottish League Two (Scotland)		Capacity: 5,000
Elgin City	Forfar Athletic	Montrose	Stirling Albion
Borough Briggs	Station Park	Links Park	Forthbank Stadium
Capacity: 4,520	Capacity: 6,777	Capacity: 4,936	Capacity: 3,808

=== Personnel and kits ===
Team	Manager	Captain	Kit manufacturer	Shirt sponsor
Annan Athletic	(Scotland) Jim Chapman	(Scotland) Steven Black	Stanno	M&S Engineering Ltd
Arbroath	(Scotland) Dick Campbell	(Scotland) Mark Whatley	Pendle	Megatech
Berwick Rangers	(United States) John Coughlin	(Scotland) Jordyn Sheerin	Zoo Sport	Simple Energy Scotland Ltd
Clyde	(Scotland) Jon-Paul McGovern & (Scotland) Peter MacDonald (joint interim)	(Scotland) Scott Ferguson	Hummel	Advance Construction Group (H), Heartfelt Limited (A)
Cowdenbeath	(Scotland) Gary Locke	(Scotland) David McGurn	Uhlsport	Subsea Pressure Controls
Edinburgh City	(Scotland) Gary Jardine	(Scotland) Dougie Gair	Joma	Hutchinson Networks
Elgin City	(Scotland) Jim Weir	(Scotland) Archie MacPhee	EC 1893	McDonald & Munro
Forfar Athletic	(Scotland) Gary Bollan	(Scotland) David Cox	Pendle	Orchard Timber Products
Montrose	(Scotland) Stewart Petrie	(Scotland) Paul Watson	Nike	Intervention Rentals
Stirling Albion	(Scotland) Dave Mackay	(Scotland) Ross McMillan	Macron	Prudential

=== Managerial changes ===
Team	Outgoing manager	Manner of departure	Date of vacancy	Position in table	Incoming manager	Date of appointment
Cowdenbeath	(Scotland) Colin Nish	Sacked	12 May 2016	Pre-season	(Scotland) Liam Fox	23 May 2016
Stirling Albion	(Scotland) Stuart McLaren	Sacked	24 September 2016	9th	(Scotland) Martyn Corrigan (caretaker)	24 September 2016
Stirling Albion	(Scotland) Martyn Corrigan (caretaker)	Stepped down	5 November 2016	7th	(Scotland) Dave Mackay	9 November 2016
Montrose	(Scotland) Paul Hegarty	Sacked	16 November 2016	9th	(Scotland) John Holt (caretaker)	16 November 2016
Montrose	(Scotland) John Holt (caretaker)	Interim ended	4 December 2016	10th	(Scotland) Stewart Petrie	4 December 2016
Clyde	(Scotland) Barry Ferguson	Resigned	26 February 2017	8th	(Scotland) Bob Malcolm (interim)	26 February 2017
Clyde	(Scotland) Bob Malcolm (interim)	Interim ended	2 March 2017	9th	(Scotland) Jon-Paul McGovern & (Scotland) Peter MacDonald (joint interim)	2 March 2017
Cowdenbeath	(Scotland) Liam Fox	Resigned	6 March 2017	10th	(Scotland) Gary Locke	10 March 2017

== League summary ==
=== League table ===
Pos	Team	Pld	W	D	L	GF	GA	GD	Pts	Promotion, qualification or relegation
1	Arbroath (C, P)	36	18	12	6	63	36	+27	66	Promotion to League One
2	Forfar Athletic (O, P)	36	18	10	8	69	49	+20	64	Qualification to League One play-offs
3	Annan Athletic	36	18	4	14	61	58	+3	58	Qualification to League One play-offs
4	Montrose	36	14	10	12	44	53	−9	52	Qualification to League One play-offs
5	Elgin City	36	14	9	13	67	47	+20	51	
6	Stirling Albion	36	12	11	13	50	59	−9	47	
7	Edinburgh City	36	11	10	15	38	45	−7	43	
8	Berwick Rangers	36	10	10	16	50	65	−15	40	
9	Clyde	36	10	8	18	49	64	−15	38	
10	Cowdenbeath (O)	36	9	8	19	40	55	−15	35	Qualification to League Two play-off finals

Source: BBC Sport
Rules for classification: 1) Points; 2) Goal difference; 3) Number of goals scored
(C) Champions; (O) Play-off winners; (P) Promoted

=== Positions by round ===
Leader - Promotion to 2017–18 Scottish League One
Qualification to League One play-offs
Qualification to League Two play-offs

The table lists the positions of teams after each week of matches. In order to preserve chronological progress, any postponed matches are not included in the round at which they were originally scheduled, but added to the full round they were played immediately afterwards. For example, if a match is scheduled for matchday 13, but then postponed and played between days 16 and 17, it will be added to the standings for day 16.

Team ╲ Round	1	2	3	4	5	6	7	8	9	10	11	12	13	14	15	16	17	18	19	20	21	22	23	24	25	26	27	28	29	30	31	32	33	34	35	36
Arbroath	5	6	4	2	4	4	5	6	4	4	4	3	3	4	4	3	2	2	2	2	2	2	2	2	2	2	2	2	2	2	2	2	2	2	1	1
Forfar Athletic	2	2	1	1	1	1	1	1	1	1	1	1	1	1	1	1	1	1	1	1	1	1	1	1	1	1	1	1	1	1	1	1	1	1	2	2
Annan Athletic	1	5	3	5	6	6	6	5	6	6	6	6	5	5	5	5	5	5	4	4	4	4	4	4	4	4	4	3	4	3	3	4	3	3	3	3
Montrose	9	8	9	9	9	8	8	7	8	8	9	9	9	10	10	9	6	7	9	8	5	5	5	5	5	5	5	6	6	6	5	6	5	4	4	4
Elgin City	4	1	2	6	3	5	3	3	2	2	2	2	4	2	2	2	3	3	3	3	3	3	3	3	3	3	3	4	3	4	4	3	4	5	5	5
Stirling Albion	7	7	5	7	8	9	9	8	7	7	7	7	7	9	9	10	8	9	7	6	7	9	8	9	8	7	6	5	5	5	6	5	6	6	6	6
Edinburgh City	7	10	10	10	10	10	10	10	10	10	10	10	10	8	8	7	7	6	6	7	8	8	9	8	9	9	9	9	9	8	9	8	7	7	7	7
Berwick Rangers	6	3	6	4	5	3	4	4	5	5	5	5	6	7	7	6	9	10	8	9	9	7	7	7	6	6	7	7	7	7	7	7	9	9	9	8
Clyde	3	4	7	3	2	2	2	2	3	3	3	4	2	3	3	4	4	4	5	5	6	6	6	6	7	8	8	8	8	9	8	9	8	8	8	9
Cowdenbeath	10	9	8	8	7	7	7	9	9	9	8	8	8	6	6	8	10	8	10	10	10	10	10	10	10	10	10	10	10	10	10	10	10	10	10	10

Updated to match(es) played on 7 May 2017. Source:

== Results ==
Teams play each other four times, twice in the first half of the season (home and away) and twice in the second half of the season (home and away), making a total of 36 games.

=== First half of season ===
Home \ Away	ANN	ARB	BER	CLY	COW	EDC	ELG	FOR	MON	STI
Annan Athletic		1–2	3–1	3–2	2–0	1–1	1–0	1–2	2–3	3–2
Arbroath	1–1		1–1	4–0	0–0	0–1	3–2	2–0	0–0	5–3
Berwick Rangers	2–0	1–1		1–1	1–1	1–3	2–4	1–2	1–2	3–2
Clyde	2–3	3–2	3–2		5–3	0–0	2–1	0–1	2–1	1–1
Cowdenbeath	2–2	0–2	0–2	1–0		2–0	0–1	3–4	2–0	0–2
Edinburgh City	1–0	3–3	1–2	0–1	1–1		1–2	2–3	0–1	2–0
Elgin City	0–2	0–1	6–0	0–2	3–1	3–0		2–2	4–1	2–3
Forfar Athletic	5–1	0–1	2–0	4–3	4–3	1–1	3–2		1–3	4–1
Montrose	2–2	1–1	0–0	2–1	1–2	0–1	0–5	1–1		2–2
Stirling Albion	3–1	2–2	0–0	1–1	1–2	1–1	0–4	0–3	2–0	

Updated to match(es) played on 2 January 2017. Source: Scottish League 2
Legend: Blue = home team win; Yellow = draw; Red = away team win.

=== Second half of season ===
Home \ Away	ANN	ARB	BER	CLY	COW	EDC	ELG	FOR	MON	STI
Annan Athletic		2–5	2–1	1–0	1–0	1–0	1–0	1–2	5–1	4–1
Arbroath	1–2		4–1	1–0	4–1	0–1	3–2	0–1	0–1	1–1
Berwick Rangers	4–1	0–2		4–3	1–3	3–2	0–1	3–2	0–1	0–1
Clyde	2–1	1–2	1–1		0–2	3–1	3–2	2–2	1–2	2–3
Cowdenbeath	0–1	1–2	0–1	1–0		1–2	1–1	1–1	0–2	0–2
Edinburgh City	2–0	0–2	2–2	0–0	1–1		3–0	0–1	1–1	1–0
Elgin City	3–2	0–0	2–2	4–1	0–0	3–1		1–1	1–1	2–2
Forfar Athletic	2–4	1–1	2–3	3–0	3–1	1–2	1–1		0–0	1–1
Montrose	2–3	1–3	2–1	1–1	2–1	3–0	0–3	1–0		1–3
Stirling Albion	1–0	1–1	2–2	3–0	0–3	1–0	1–0	0–3	1–2	

Updated to match(es) played on 6 May 2017. Source: Scottish League 2
Legend: Blue = home team win; Yellow = draw; Red = away team win.

== Season statistics ==
=== Scoring ===
==== Top scorers ====
As of matches played on 6 May 2017

Rank	Player	Club	Goals
1	(Scotland) Shane Sutherland	Elgin City	18
2	(Scotland) Peter MacDonald	Clyde	17
3	(Scotland) Ryan McCord	Arbroath	13
3	(Scotland) Steven Thomson	Berwick Rangers	13
3	(Scotland) Brian Cameron	Elgin City	13
6	(Scotland) Steven Doris	Arbroath	12
6	(Scotland) Danny Denholm	Forfar Athletic	12
8	(Scotland) David McKenna	Annan Athletic	11
8	(Scotland) Gary Fraser	Montrose	11
8	(Scotland) David Cox	Forfar Athletic	11
8	(Scotland) Josh Peters	Forfar Athletic	11
8	(Scotland) Darren Smith	Stirling Albion	11

==== Hat-tricks ====
Player	For	Against	Result	Date	Ref
(Scotland) Bobby Linn	Arbroath	Stirling Albion	5–3	27 August 2016	
(Scotland) Shane Sutherland	Elgin City	Berwick Rangers	6–0	10 December 2016	
(Scotland) Shane Sutherland	Elgin City	Edinburgh City	3–1	28 January 2017	
(Scotland) Steven Thomson	Berwick Rangers	Annan Athletic	4–1	4 February 2017	
(Scotland) David Goodwillie	Clyde	Elgin City	3–2	15 April 2017	
(Scotland) Ryan McCord	Arbroath	Elgin City	3–2	29 April 2017	

=== Discipline ===
==== Player ====
===== Yellow cards =====
As of matches played on 6 May 2017

Rank	Player	Club	Cards
1	(Scotland) Michael Bolochoweckyj	Montrose	12
2	(Scotland) Mark Nicolson	Elgin City	10
2	(Scotland) Terry Masson	Montrose	10
4	(Scotland) Kyle Miller	Cowdenbeath	9
4	(Scotland) David Gormley	Clyde	9
6	(Scotland) Darren Lavery	Berwick Rangers	8
6	(Scotland) Sean Higgins	Clyde	8
6	(Scotland) Aaron Dunsmore	Edinburgh City	8
6	(Scotland) Ryan Porteous	Edinburgh City	8
6	(Scotland) Martyn Fotheringham	Forfar Athletic	8
6	(Scotland) Gavin Swankie	Forfar Athletic	8

===== Red cards =====
As of matches played on 6 May 2017

Rank	Player	Club	Cards
1	(Scotland) Michael McKenna	Berwick Rangers	3
2	(Scotland) Darren Ramsay	Annan Athletic	2
2	(Scotland) Ricky Little	Arbroath	2
2	(England) Jassem Sukar	Arbroath	2
2	(Scotland) Gary Fraser	Montrose	2
2	(Scotland) Terry Masson	Montrose	2

==== Club ====
===== Yellow cards =====
As of matches played on 6 May 2017

Rank	Club	Cards
1	Forfar Athletic	72
2	Berwick Rangers	68
2	Clyde	68

===== Red cards =====
As of matches played on 6 May 2017

Rank	Club	Cards
1	Berwick Rangers	9
2	Montrose	8
3	Forfar Athletic	6

=== Attendances ===
Pos	Team	Total	High	Low	Average	Change
1	Annan Athletic	6,955	461	241	386	−13.6%
2	Arbroath	13,078	1,731	482	726	+11.5%
3	Berwick Rangers	7,679	695	302	426	−7.6%
4	Clyde	9,472	738	365	526	−14.1%
5	Cowdenbeath	6,216	571	258	345	−42.0%
6	Edinburgh City	7,212	590	256	400	n/a
7	Elgin City	12,366	1,091	519	687	−6.7%
8	Forfar Athletic	10,861	1,564	337	638	−8.6%
9	Montrose	10,901	1,324	283	605	+7.1%
10	Stirling Albion	11,508	1,748	412	639	+3.7%
	League total	96,248	1,748	241	537	−3.2%

Updated to games played on 6 May 2017

== Awards ==
=== Monthly awards ===
Month	Manager of the Month		Player of the Month		Ref.
Month	Manager	Club	Player	Club	Ref.
August	(Scotland) Gary Bollan	Forfar Athletic	(Scotland) Josh Peters	Forfar Athletic	
September	(Scotland) Gary Bollan	Forfar Athletic	(Scotland) Thomas O'Brien	Forfar Athletic	
October	(Scotland) Jim Weir	Elgin City	(Scotland) Shane Sutherland	Elgin City	
November	(Scotland) Gary Jardine	Edinburgh City	(Scotland) Marc Laird	Edinburgh City	
December	(Scotland) Gary Jardine	Edinburgh City	(Scotland) Andrew Stobie	Edinburgh City	
January	(Scotland) Gary Bollan	Forfar Athletic	(Scotland) Shane Sutherland	Elgin City	
February	(Scotland) Jim Chapman	Annan Athletic	(England) Gavin Skelton	Annan Athletic	
March	(Scotland) Dave Mackay	Stirling Albion	(England) Greg Rutherford	Berwick Rangers	
April	(Scotland) Dick Campbell	Arbroath	(Scotland) Ryan McCord	Arbroath	

PFA Scotland Team of the Year

=== Annual awards ===
==== League Two Manager of the Season ====
- The League Two Manager of the Season was awarded to Dick Campbell.

==== League Two Player of the Season ====
- The League Two Player of the Season was awarded to Shane Sutherland.

==== PFA Scotland Scottish League Two Team of the Year ====
The PFA Scotland Scottish Championship Team of the Year was:

- Goalkeeper: Chris Smith (Stirling Albion)
- Defence: Ricky Little (Arbroath), Thomas O'Brien (Forfar Athletic), Colin Hamilton (Arbroath), Archie MacPhee (Elgin City)
- Midfield: Brian Cameron (Elgin City), Thomas Reilly (Elgin City), Bobby Linn (Arbroath)
- Attack: Steven Doris (Arbroath), Shane Sutherland (Elgin City), Peter MacDonald (footballer) (Clyde)

== League Two play-offs ==
The semi-final was contested between the winners of the 2016–17 Highland Football League (Buckie Thistle) and the 2016–17 Lowland Football League (East Kilbride). The winners then played off against the bottom club in League Two (Cowdenbeath).

=== Semi-finals ===
==== First leg ====
29 April 2017	Buckie Thistle	2 – 2	East Kilbride	Buckie
15:00	Angus 9'; Urquhart 31' (pen.)	BBC Sport report	Victoria 44'; McLean 85'	Stadium: Victoria Park; Referee: David Munro

==== Second leg ====
6 May 2017	East Kilbride	2 – 1 (4–3 agg.)	Buckie Thistle	East Kilbride
15:00	Winter 5'; Strachan 21'	BBC Sport report	Proctor 31' (o.g.); Copeland (yellow card) 44' (yellow-red card); Angus (red card) 80'	Stadium: K-Park Training Academy

=== Final ===
==== First leg ====
13 May 2017	East Kilbride	0–0	Cowdenbeath	East Kilbride
15:00		BBC Sport report		Stadium: K-Park Training Academy; Attendance: 548; Referee: Gavin Duncan

==== Second leg ====
20 May 2017	Cowdenbeath	1 – 1 (a.e.t.) (1–1 agg.) (5 – 3 p)	East Kilbride	Cowdenbeath
14:00	Mullen 3'	BBC Sport report	Gibbons 64'	Stadium: Central Park; Attendance: 1,676; Referee: Craig Charleston
	Penalties
	Mullen (penalty scored); Renton (penalty scored); Syme (penalty scored); Johnston (penalty scored); Henderson (penalty scored)		Strachan (penalty scored); McLean (penalty scored); Woods (penalty missed); Victoria (penalty scored)
