= 2026–27 North Caledonian Football League =

North Caledonian Football League
- Season: 2026–27
- Dates: 8 August 2026 – April 2027
- Matches: 77
- Goals: 378 (4.91 per match)
- Biggest home win: Dingwall 9–0 Halkirk United (3 October 2026)
- Biggest away win: Bonar Bridge 0–10 Orkney (17 October 2026)
- Highest scoring: Bonar Bridge 0–10 Orkney (17 October 2026)
- Longest winning run: 5 matches: Orkney & Thurso
- Longest unbeaten run: 9 matches: Golspie Sutherland
- Longest winless run: 9 matches: Bonar Bridge
- Longest losing run: 9 matches: Bonar Bridge
- All statistics correct as of 21 November 2026.

The 2026–27 North Caledonian Football League (known as the Macleod & MacCallum North Caledonian League for sponsorship reasons) is the 118th season of the North Caledonian Football League, and the 6th season of being the 6th tier of the Scottish football pyramid. Three-time defending champions Invergordon are unable to defend their title due to being promoted to the Highland League.

== Teams ==
Location of teams in 2026–27 North Caledonian Football League
Location of Orkney in the 2026–27 North Caledonian League

Dingwall joined the league for the first time, being the first representatives of Dingwall since Dingwall Thistle folded in 2012, and Bunillidh Thistle from Helmsdale returned after taking a season out last season.

=== From North Caledonian League ===
Promoted to the Highland League

- Invergordon

=== To North Caledonian League ===
Rejoined

- Bunillidh Thistle

Joined

- Dingwall

=== Stadia and locations ===
Team	Location	Home ground	Surface	Capacity	Seats	Floodlit
Alness United	Alness	New Dalmore Park	Artificial	500	0	Yes
Bonar Bridge	Bonar Bridge	Migdale Playing Fields	Grass	500	0	No
Bunillidh Thistle	Helmsdale	Couper Park	Grass	500	0	No
Clachnacuddin 'A'	Inverness	Bught Park Stadium	Grass	5,000	2,000	No
Dingwall	Dingwall	Highland Football Academy	Artificial	1,000	0	Yes
Fort William	Fort William	Claggan Park	Grass	1,800	200	Yes
Golspie Sutherland ^{[SFA]}	Golspie	King George V Park	Grass	1,000	0	Yes
Halkirk United	Halkirk	Morrison Park	Grass	1,000	0	Yes
Inverness Athletic	Inverness	Inverness CT Community Hub	Grass	1,000	0	No
Inverness Thistle	North Kessock	Ferry Brae Park	Grass	500	0	No
Orkney	Kirkwall	Kirkwall Grammar School	Artificial	500	0	Yes
St Duthus	Tain	Grant Park	Grass	500	0	No
Thurso	Thurso	Sir George's Park	Grass	1,000	0	No

== League table ==
Only Golspie Sutherland are eligible for qualification to the Highland League play-off, as the division's sole SFA club licence holders.

Pos	Team	Pld	W	D	L	GF	GA	GD	Pts	Promotion or qualification
1	Thurso	13	10	0	3	48	25	+23	30	Ineligible for the Highland League play-off
2	Orkney	12	8	1	3	37	13	+24	25	
3	Inverness Athletic	11	8	1	2	36	20	+16	25	
4	Dingwall	13	8	0	5	36	13	+23	24	
5	Golspie Sutherland	13	6	5	2	35	21	+14	23	
6	Alness United	11	7	1	3	29	18	+11	22	
7	Fort William	11	7	0	4	37	21	+16	21	
8	Clachnacuddin 'A'	10	5	1	4	27	25	+2	16	Ineligible for promotion
9	Inverness Thistle	14	5	1	8	36	36	0	16	
10	Bunillidh Thistle	12	3	0	9	19	32	−13	9	
11	Halkirk United	11	3	0	8	15	42	−27	9	
12	St Duthus	11	1	0	10	13	54	−41	3	
13	Bonar Bridge	12	1	0	11	10	58	−48	3	

Updated to match(es) played on 21 November 2026. Source: North Caledonian Football League
Rules for classification: 1) Points; 2) Goal difference; 3) Goals scored
