= 2024–25 North Caledonian Football League =

North Caledonian Football League
- Season: 2024–25
- Dates: 17 August 2024 – 9 April 2025
- Champions: Invergordon
- Matches: 132
- Goals: 589 (4.46 per match)
- Biggest home win: Invergordon 15–1 Bunillidh Thistle (12 October 2024)
- Biggest away win: Bonar Bridge 0–8 Invergordon (22 February 2025)
- Highest scoring: Invergordon 15–1 Bunillidh Thistle (12 October 2024)
- Longest winning run: 10 matches: Invergordon
- Longest unbeaten run: 17 matches: Invergordon
- Longest winless run: 13 matches: Thurso
- Longest losing run: 11 matches: Thurso
- All statistics correct as of 9 April 2025.

The 2024–25 North Caledonian Football League (known as the Macleod & MacCallum North Caledonian League for sponsorship reasons) was the 116th season of the North Caledonian Football League, and the fourth season as part of the sixth tier of the Scottish football pyramid system. Defending champions Invergordon retained their league championship, winning the title on 22 March 2025 with a match to spare – having opened a six-point gap on closest challengers Halkirk United.

== Teams ==
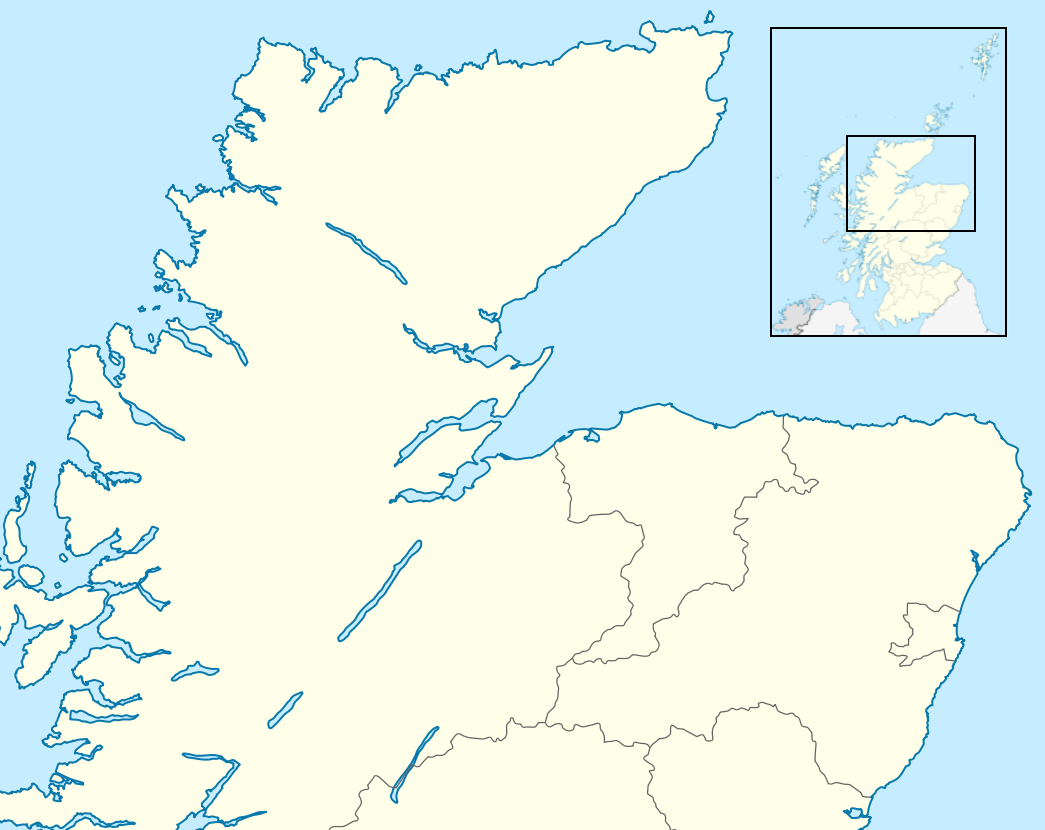
Location of mainland teams in the 2024–25 North Caledonian League
Location of Orkney in the 2024–25 North Caledonian League

Bunillidh Thistle of Helmsdale rejoined the league for the first time since they pulled out of the 2020–21 season due to the COVID-19 pandemic, while Loch Ness withdrew from the league.

=== From North Caledonian League ===
Withdrew

- Loch Ness

=== To North Caledonian League ===
Rejoined

- Bunillidh Thistle

=== Stadia and locations ===
Team	Location	Home ground	Surface	Capacity	Seats	Floodlit
Alness United	Alness	New Dalmore Park	Artificial	500	0	Yes
Bonar Bridge	Bonar Bridge	Migdale Playing Fields	Grass	500	0	No
Bunillidh Thistle	Helmsdale	Couper Park	Grass	500	0	No
Clachnacuddin 'A'	Inverness	Inverness Royal Academy	Artificial	500	0	Yes
Fort William	Fort William	Claggan Park	Grass	1,800	200	Yes
Golspie Sutherland ^{[SFA]}	Golspie	King George V Park	Grass	1,000	0	Yes
Halkirk United	Halkirk	Morrison Park	Grass	1,000	0	Yes
Invergordon	Invergordon	Recreation Grounds	Grass	800	0	No
Inverness Athletic	North Kessock	Ferry Brae Park	Grass	500	0	No
Orkney	Kirkwall	Kirkwall Grammar School	Artificial	500	0	Yes
St Duthus	Tain	Grant Park	Grass	500	0	No
Thurso	Thurso	Sir George's Park	Grass	1,000	0	No

^{SFA} Club with an SFA licence eligible to participate in the Highland League promotion play-off should they win the league, and also compete in the Scottish Cup.

== League table ==
Pos	Team	Pld	W	D	L	GF	GA	GD	Pts	Promotion or qualification
1	Invergordon (C)	22	20	1	1	93	14	+79	61	Ineligible for the Highland League play-off
2	Halkirk United	22	18	1	3	74	17	+57	55	
3	Inverness Athletic	22	15	2	5	68	31	+37	47	
4	Golspie Sutherland	22	14	0	8	57	31	+26	42	
5	Orkney	22	13	1	8	52	39	+13	40	
6	Alness United	22	10	3	9	46	44	+2	33	
7	St Duthus	22	9	6	7	38	37	+1	33	
8	Fort William	22	9	1	12	53	60	−7	28	
9	Bonar Bridge	22	6	2	14	35	64	−29	20	
10	Clachnacuddin 'A'	22	3	3	16	40	73	−33	12	Ineligible for promotion
11	Thurso	22	3	1	18	17	79	−62	10	
12	Bunillidh Thistle (Note: Bunillidh Thistle deducted 3 points for failing to fulfil a fixture away to Orkney.)	22	1	1	20	16	100	−84	1	

Source: North Caledonian Football League
Rules for classification: 1) Points; 2) Goal difference; 3) Goals scored
(C) Champions

== Results ==
Home \ Away	ALN	BON	BUN	CLA	FOW	GOL	HAL	INV	INA	ORK	STD	THU
Alness United		1–0	6–1	6–2	6–2	2–0	2–7	0–2	2–2	2–3	0–1	3–2
Bonar Bridge	1–3		3–0	3–1	5–1	0–2	2–6	0–8	0–4 (Note: Match played at Highland Football Academy 3G, Dingwall.)	3–2	1–1	1–2
Bunillidh Thistle	1–3	1–4		2–3	1–2	0–7	0–6	1–4	0–3	0–2	2–2	2–0
Clachnacuddin 'A'	2–3 (Note: Match played at Culloden Academy, Culloden.)	4–4 (Note: Match played at Culloden Academy, Culloden.)	3–2 (Note: Match played at Culcairn Park, Evanton.)		1–5 (Note: Match played at Culcairn Park, Evanton.)	1–3 (Note: Match played at Culcairn Park, Evanton.)	1–3 (Note: Match played at Grant Street Park.)	0–5 (Note: Match played at Culloden Academy, Culloden.)	0–2	4–5 (Note: Match played at Culcairn Park, Evanton.)	2–2	0–2
Fort William	2–1	2–0 (Note: Match played at Lochaber High School.)	11–2 (Note: Match played at Lochaber High School.)	2–1		2–3	1–2	2–5 (Note: Match played at Lochaber High School.)	1–3	1–4 (Note: Match played at Dalmore Park, Alness.)	1–2	7–0
Golspie Sutherland	1–2	3–0	6–0	3–2	7–0		1–4	0–2	0–4	3–0	2–1	6–0
Halkirk United	4–0	5–1	6–0	4–0	2–0	1–2		0–0	3–4	1–0	1–0	9–1
Invergordon	3–1	5–1	15–1	3–1	5–0	3–1	0–2		6–0	2–0	4–0	6–0
Inverness Athletic	3–0 (Note: Match played at Highland Football Academy 3G, Dingwall.)	3–1	6–0	6–1	5–6 (Note: Match played at Dalmore Park, Alness.)	1–2	2–0	1–3		4–0	0–2	4–1
Orkney	3–1	6–0	1–0 (Note: Match awarded 1–0 to Orkney as Bunillidh Thistle failed to fulfil the fixture.)	5–2	1–0 (Note: Match played at King George V Park, Golspie.)	3–2	0–3	1–6	2–2		1–2	4–0
St Duthus	1–1	4–2	3–0	2–2	2–2	2–1	0–2	2–4	1–2	1–7		6–0
Thurso	1–1	0–3	4–0 (Note: Match played at Morrison Park, Halkirk.)	1–7	2–3	1–2	0–3	0–2	0–7 (Note: Match played at Naver 3G.)	0–2	0–1	

Legend: Blue = home team win; Yellow = draw; Red = away team win.
