= 2022–23 North Caledonian Football League =

North Caledonian Football League
- Season: 2022–23
- Dates: 20 August 2022 – 22 April 2023
- Champions: Loch Ness
- Matches: 156
- Goals: 744 (4.77 per match)
- Biggest home win: Loch Ness 10–0 Bonar Bridge (26 November 2022); Thurso 10–0 Bonar Bridge (11 February 2023)
- Biggest away win: Bonar Bridge 1–12 Loch Ness (4 March 2023)
- Highest scoring: Bonar Bridge 1–12 Loch Ness (4 March 2023)
- Longest winning run: 9 matches: Invergordon
- Longest unbeaten run: 14 matches: Loch Ness
- Longest winless run: 16 matches: Bonar Bridge
- Longest losing run: 16 matches: Bonar Bridge
- All statistics correct as of 22 April 2023.

The 2022–23 North Caledonian Football League (known for sponsorship reasons as the Macleod & MacCallum North Caledonian League) was the 114th season of the North Caledonian Football League, and the second season as part of the sixth tier of the Scottish football pyramid system.

Loch Ness won the league title for the first time; their 5–0 victory over Fort William coupled with Invergordon's 1–1 draw against Orkney on 8 April 2023, gave them an unassailable 10-point lead over Invergordon with 3 games remaining (the margin was 4 points at the end of the season). As such, they entered the 2023–24 Scottish Cup at the Preliminary Round stage, as they had not already qualified as a non-SFA member.

== Teams ==
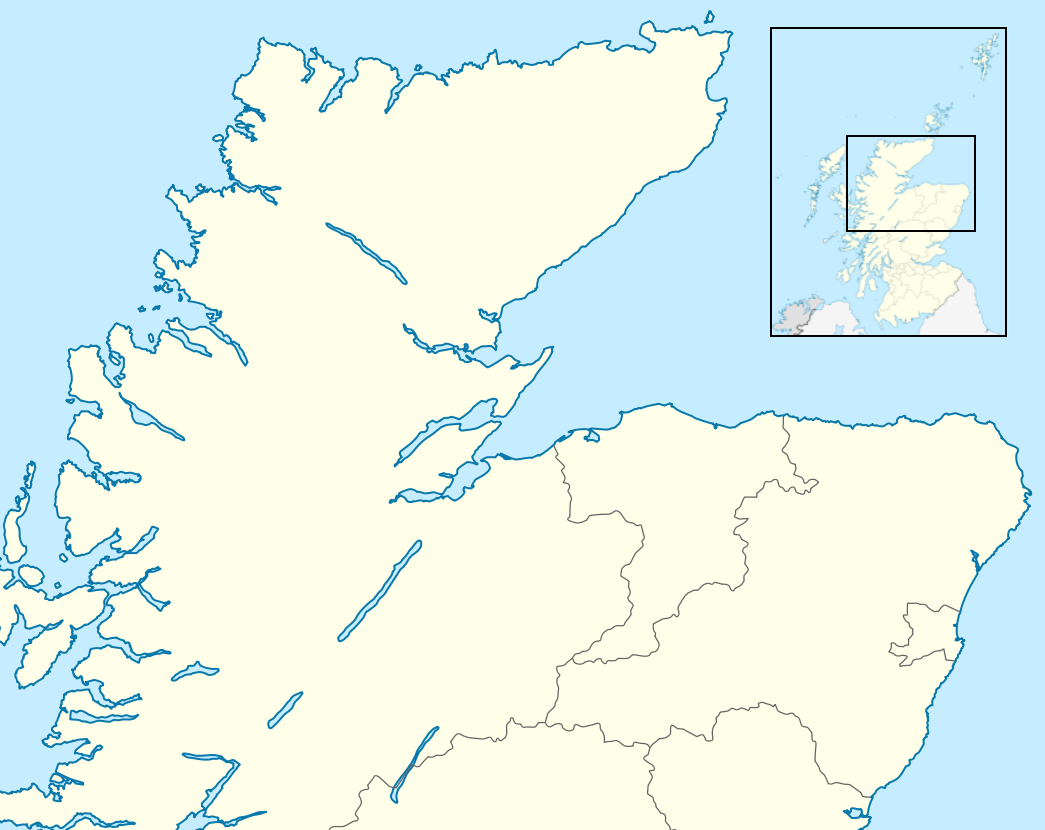
Location of mainland teams in the 2022–23 North Caledonian League
Location of Orkney in the 2022–23 North Caledonian League

=== To North Caledonian Football League ===
- Clachnacuddin Reserves

Relegated from Highland Football League

- Fort William

=== Stadia and locations ===
Team	Location	Home ground	Capacity	Seats	Floodlit
Alness United	Alness	Dalmore Park	TBC	0	Yes
Bonar Bridge	Bonar Bridge	Migdale Playing Fields	500	0	No
Clachnacuddin Reserves	Inverness	Grant Street Park	3,000	154	Yes
Fort William ^{[SFA]}	Fort William	Claggan Park	4,000	400	Yes
Golspie Sutherland ^{[SFA]}	Golspie	King George V Park	1,000	0	Yes
Halkirk United	Halkirk	Morrison Park	1,000	0	Yes
Invergordon	Invergordon	Recreation Grounds	500	0	No
Inverness Athletic	North Kessock	Ferry Brae Park	500	0	No
Loch Ness	Fortrose	King George V Park	500	0	No
Nairn County 'A'	Nairn	Riverside Park	500	0	No
Orkney	Holm	The Rockworks	1,000	0	No
St Duthus	Tain	Grant Park	500	0	No
Thurso	Thurso	Sir George's Park	1,000	0	No

== League table ==
Pos	Team	Pld	W	D	L	GF	GA	GD	Pts	Promotion or qualification
1	Loch Ness (C)	24	20	2	2	101	28	+73	62	Ineligible for the Highland League play-off
2	Invergordon	24	19	1	4	75	24	+51	58	
3	Fort William	24	15	0	9	79	46	+33	45	
4	St Duthus	24	14	2	8	63	49	+14	44	
5	Orkney	24	12	6	6	57	35	+22	42	
6	Golspie Sutherland	24	13	3	8	56	48	+8	42	
7	Inverness Athletic	24	13	1	10	50	45	+5	40	
8	Halkirk United	24	10	2	12	53	56	−3	32	
9	Alness United	24	10	1	13	69	63	+6	31	
10	Clachnacuddin Reserves	24	9	0	15	50	64	−14	27	Ineligible for promotion
11	Nairn County A	24	5	1	18	33	73	−40	16	Ineligible for promotion
12	Thurso	24	4	3	17	38	70	−32	15	
13	Bonar Bridge	24	1	0	23	20	143	−123	3	

Source: North Caledonian Football League
Rules for classification: 1) Points; 2) Goal difference; 3) Goals scored
(C) Champions

== Results ==
Home \ Away	ALN	BON	CLA	FOW	GOL	HAL	INV	INA	LOC	NAI	ORK	STD	THU
Alness United	—	10–1	2–1	2–4	6–2	0–1	2–1	1–3	0–2	4–3	2–5	7–0	9–2
Bonar Bridge	3–4 (Note: Match played at Dalmore Park, Alness.)	—	1–6 (Note: Match played at Dalmore Park, Alness.)	0–4	0–7 (Note: Match played at King George V Park, Golspie.)	1–8	1–5	1–3	1–12	4–2	0–4	0–5	1–5
Clachnacuddin Reserves	0–4 (Note: Match played at Bught Park, due to a clashing Highland League fixture for Clachnacuddin at Grant Street Park.)	6–0 (Note: Match played at Inverness Royal Academy 4G.)	—	2–8 (Note: Match played at Inverness Royal Academy 4G.)	2–0 (Note: Match played at Inverness Royal Academy 4G.)	1–3 (Note: Match played at Inverness Royal Academy 4G.)	1–2 (Note: Match played at Highland Football Academy 3G, Dingwall.)	0–1 (Note: Match played at Inverness Royal Academy 4G.)	1–7	1–0 (Note: Match played at Inverness Royal Academy 4G.)	0–7 (Note: Match played at Dalmore Park, Alness.)	0–3 (Note: Match played at Inverness Royal Academy 4G.)	7–0
Fort William	4–2	8–0	4–3	—	0–2	3–1	1–2	1–2	1–2	4–0	5–1 (Note: Match played at Dalmore Park, Alness.)	4–0	6–0
Golspie Sutherland	3–3	5–2	4–1	3–2	—	2–1	0–1	0–1	3–4	2–1	1–6	4–2	2–1
Halkirk United	3–2	5–1	2–5	1–6	2–2	—	1–2	2–0	1–4	1–0	3–1	2–3	3–0
Invergordon	3–1 (Note: Match played at Highland Football Academy 3G, Dingwall.)	9–0	4–0	6–1	6–2 (Note: Match played at Highland Football Academy 3G, Dingwall.)	3–1	—	2–1	1–3	4–0	1–1	3–1	5–0
Inverness Athletic	2–0 (Note: Match played at Inverness Royal Academy 4G.)	8–0 (Note: Match played at Inverness Royal Academy 4G.)	2–1	3–5 (Note: Match played at Inverness Royal Academy 4G.)	2–3	2–3	0–5	—	2–1 (Note: Match played at Inverness Royal Academy 4G.)	3–1 (Note: Match played at Inverness Royal Academy 4G.)	1–2	2–3 (Note: Match played at Dalmore Park, Alness.)	2–1
Loch Ness	8–0	10–0	3–1	5–0	1–3	7–4	3–1	3–2 (Note: Match played at Canal Park, Inverness.)	—	7–1	0–0	2–1	2–0
Nairn County 'A'	3–2	1–0 (Note: Match played at Nairn Academy 3G.)	0–3	1–6 (Note: Match played at Nairn Academy 3G.)	0–2	4–3 (Note: Match played at Nairn Academy 3G.)	1–2	3–3	3–5	—	0–5	4–2 (Note: Match played at Station Park.)	2–4 (Note: Match played at Nairn Academy 3G.)
Orkney	– (Note: Match awarded to Orkney, as Alness United were unable to field a team.)	3–1	3–2	4–0 (Note: Match played at Morrison Park, Halkirk.)	2–2	3–0	1–2	2–3	1–5 (Note: Match played at Kirkwall Grammar School 3G.)	1–0	—	2–2	0–2
St Duthus	9–1	3–2	1–2	3–0	1–0	4–2	1–0	4–0	1–5	4–1	2–2	—	3–1
Thurso	0–5	10–0 (Note: Match played at Naver 3G.)	3–4 (Note: Match played at Naver 3G.)	1–2	1–2	0–0 (Note: Match played at Morrison Park, Halkirk.)	1–5 (Note: Match played at Naver 3G.)	1–2	0–0 (Note: Match played at Morrison Park, Halkirk, as Sir George's Park was unplayable.)	1–2	1–1 (Note: Match played at Naver 3G.)	3–5 (Note: Match played at Naver 3G.)	—

Legend: Blue = home team win; Yellow = draw; Red = away team win.

== Notes ==
^{SFA} Club with an SFA licence (as of June 2022) eligible to participate in the Highland League play-off should they win the league.
