= 2023–24 North Caledonian Football League =

North Caledonian Football League
- Season: 2023–24
- Dates: 12 August 2023 – 13 April 2024
- Champions: Invergordon
- Matches: 132
- Goals: 586 (4.44 per match)
- Biggest home win: Inverness Athletic 13–0 Thurso (2 March 2024)
- Biggest away win: Clachnacuddin Reserves 1–7 Loch Ness (25 November 2023); St Duthus 2–8 Golspie Sutherland (25 November 2023); Clachnacuddin Reserves 1–7 Halkirk United (9 December 2023)
- Highest scoring: Inverness Athletic 13–0 Thurso (2 March 2024)
- Longest winning run: 9 matches: Loch Ness
- Longest unbeaten run: 16 matches: Loch Ness
- Longest winless run: 14 matches: Bonar Bridge
- Longest losing run: 7 matches: Bonar Bridge
- All statistics correct as of 13 April 2024.

The 2023–24 North Caledonian Football League (known for sponsorship reasons as the Macleod & MacCallum North Caledonian League) was the 115th season of the North Caledonian Football League, and the third season as part of the sixth tier of the Scottish football pyramid system.

Invergordon won their seventh North Caledonian Football League title – and their second in three seasons; a 2–0 win over Inverness Athletic on 23 March 2024 gave them an unassailable seven-point lead over Loch Ness, with Loch Ness still having two games to play.

== Teams ==
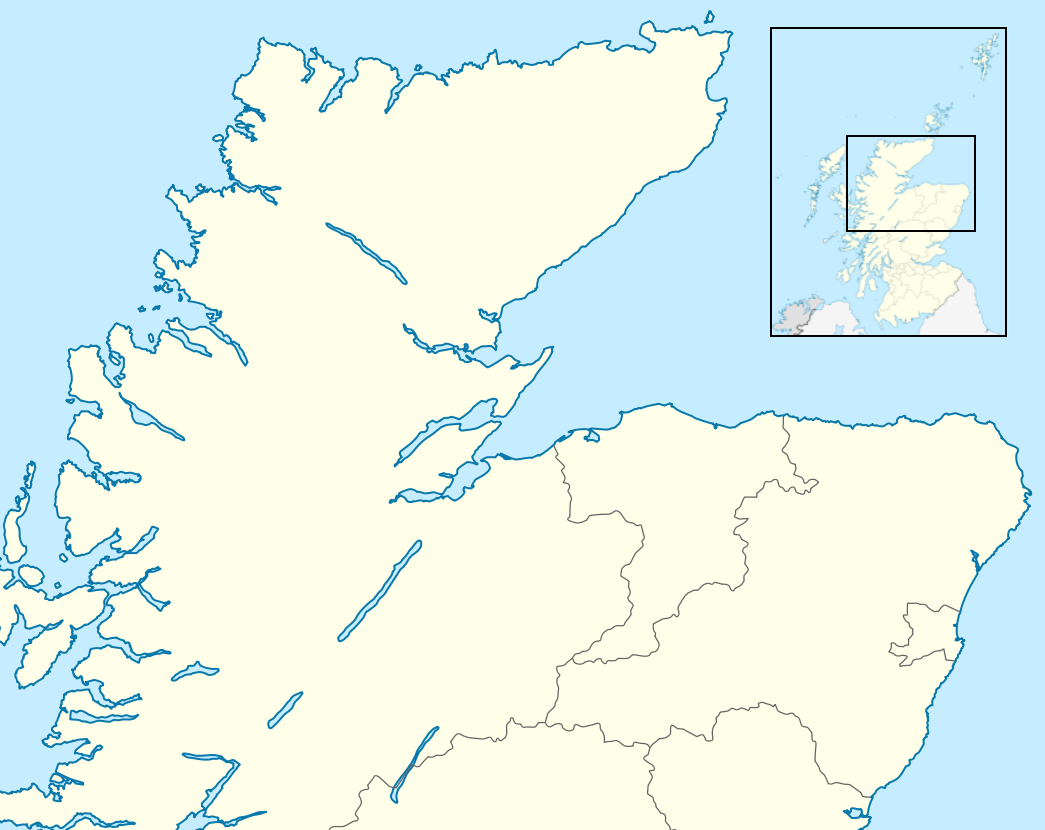
Location of mainland teams in the 2023–24 North Caledonian League
Location of Orkney in the 2023–24 North Caledonian League

=== From North Caledonian Football League ===
Withdrew

- Nairn County 'A'

=== Stadia and locations ===
Team	Location	Home ground	Capacity	Seats	Floodlit
Alness United	Alness	Dalmore Park	500	0	Yes
Bonar Bridge	Bonar Bridge	Migdale Playing Fields	500	0	No
Clachnacuddin Reserves	Inverness	Grant Street Park	2,074	154	Yes
Fort William ^{[SFA]}	Fort William	Claggan Park	1,800	200	Yes
Golspie Sutherland ^{[SFA]}	Golspie	King George V Park	1,000	0	Yes
Halkirk United	Halkirk	Morrison Park	1,000	0	Yes
Invergordon	Invergordon	Recreation Grounds	500	0	No
Inverness Athletic	North Kessock	Ferry Brae Park	500	0	No
Loch Ness	Fortrose	King George V Park	500	0	No
Orkney	Holm	The Rockworks	1,000	0	No
St Duthus	Tain	Grant Park	500	0	No
Thurso	Thurso	Sir George's Park	1,000	0	No

== League table ==
Pos	Team	Pld	W	D	L	GF	GA	GD	Pts	Promotion or qualification
1	Invergordon (C)	22	18	3	1	61	23	+38	57	Ineligible for the Highland League play-off
2	Loch Ness (Note: Loch Ness deducted 3 points for fielding an ineligible player in their match on 19 August against Clachnacuddin Reserves.)	22	17	3	2	78	24	+54	51	
3	Halkirk United	22	15	2	5	59	21	+38	47	
4	Golspie Sutherland	22	14	1	7	56	42	+14	43	
5	Fort William	22	13	2	7	61	37	+24	41	
6	St Duthus	22	9	2	11	44	59	−15	29	
7	Inverness Athletic	22	7	2	13	57	51	+6	23	
8	Orkney	22	7	2	13	38	52	−14	23	
9	Clachnacuddin Reserves (Note: Clachnacuddin Reserves awarded 3 points, after Loch Ness fielded an ineligible player in their match on 19 August.)	22	4	5	13	37	63	−26	20	Ineligible for promotion
10	Alness United	22	5	4	13	42	68	−26	19	
11	Thurso	22	5	1	16	25	81	−56	16	
12	Bonar Bridge	22	4	1	17	28	65	−37	13	

Source: North Caledonian Football League
Rules for classification: 1) Points; 2) Goal difference; 3) Goals scored
(C) Champions

== Results ==
Home \ Away	ALN	BON	CLA	FOW	GOL	HAL	INV	INA	LOC	ORK	STD	THU
Alness United	—	3–2	2–2	1–4	2–6	1–3	2–4	1–2	3–3	3–3	5–1	3–1
Bonar Bridge	1–0	—	4–3	0–4	1–3	0–2 (Note: Match played at Dalmore Park, Alness.)	0–3 (Note: Match played at the Recreation Grounds, Invergordon.)	1–1 (Note: Match played on the second pitch at Dalmore Park, Alness.)	0–4 (Note: Match played at Dalmore Park, Alness.)	1–4	0–3	3–4 (Note: Match played at Dalmore Park, Alness.)
Clachnacuddin Reserves	0–2 (Note: Match played at Culcairn Park, Evanton.)	7–3 (Note: Match played at Inverness Royal Academy.)	—	2–3 (Note: Match played at Inverness Royal Academy.)	0–2 (Note: Match played at Inverness Royal Academy.)	1–7 (Note: Match played at Inverness Royal Academy.)	0–1	2–4 (Note: Match played at Dalmore Park, Alness.)	1–7 (Note: Match played at Inverness Royal Academy.)	6–1 (Note: Match played at Culcairn Park, Evanton.)	4–4 (Note: Match played at Culcairn Park, Evanton.)	1–0 (Note: Match played at Inverness Royal Academy.)
Fort William	8–3 (Note: Match played at Lochaber High School 3G.)	4–1 (Note: Match played at Lochaber High School 3G.)	1–1	—	3–1	0–4	3–4	2–0	2–5 (Note: Match played at Lochaber High School 3G.)	7–1 (Note: Match played at Recreation Grounds, Invergordon.)	0–1	7–0
Golspie Sutherland	3–2	4–1	3–0	1–1	—	0–5	2–4	4–2	0–3	1–0 (Note: Match awarded 1–0 to Golspie Sutherland, as Orkney were unable to field a team.)	2–0	3–1
Halkirk United	0–2	3–0	4–0	1–0 (Note: Match awarded 1–0 to Halkirk United, as Fort William were unable to field a team.)	2–1	—	0–0	2–0	0–1	6–1	5–0	2–0
Invergordon	3–0	3–2	3–0 (Note: Match played at Highland Football Academy 3G, Dingwall.)	3–0	0–3	1–1	—	4–2	4–4	2–1	3–0	4–0
Inverness Athletic	6–1 (Note: Match played at Dalmore Park, Alness.)	2–5	1–1	2–3 (Note: Match played at Inverness Royal Academy.)	4–2 (Note: Match played at Inverness Royal Academy.)	3–4	0–2 (Note: Match played at Dalmore Park, Alness.)	—	3–4 (Note: Match played at Inverness Royal Academy.)	2–0	5–2 (Note: Match played at Inverness Royal Academy.)	13–0 (Note: Match played at Inverness Royal Academy.)
Loch Ness	7–0	3–1 (Note: Match played on the second pitch at Dalmore Park, Alness.)	5–0	3–0	6–2	3–0	0–3	2–0	—	2–0 (Note: Match played at Dalmore Park, Alness.)	4–2 (Note: Match played at Dalmore Park, Alness.)	7–0
Orkney	3–3 (Note: Match played at Kirkwall Grammar School, Kirkwall.)	1–0 (Note: Match awarded 1–0 to Orkney, as Bonar Bridge were unable to field a team.)	0–1	1–2 (Note: Match played at Naver 3G, Thurso.)	0–1 (Note: Match played at Stromness 3G, Stromness.)	2–1	2–3	4–2	0–3	—	5–3	6–0
St Duthus	2–1	3–0	3–2	1–2	2–8	2–1	1–3	4–3	2–2	2–3	—	3–1
Thurso	4–2	1–2	3–3	1–5	3–4	3–6 (Note: Match played at Naver 3G.)	0–4 (Note: Match played at Naver 3G.)	1–0	1–0 (Note: Match awarded 1–0 to Thurso, as Loch Ness were unable to field a team.)	1–0	0–3	—

Legend: Blue = home team win; Yellow = draw; Red = away team win.

== Notes ==
^{SFA} Club with an SFA licence (as of June 2023) eligible to participate in the Highland League play-off should they win the league.
