= 2018–19 North Caledonian Football League =

North Caledonian Football League
- Season: 2018–19
- Dates: 1 September 2018 – 6 April 2019
- Champions: Golspie Sutherland
- Matches: 64
- Goals: 277 (4.33 per match)
- Top goalscorer: Darran Goller (17 goals)
- All statistics correct as of 23 April 2019.

The 2018–19 North Caledonian Football League (known for sponsorship reasons as the Macleod & MacCallum North Caledonian League) was the 110th season of the North Caledonian Football League. The season began on 1 September 2018. Orkney were the defending champions.

Golspie Sutherland won their tenth league title, their first in four years.

== Teams ==
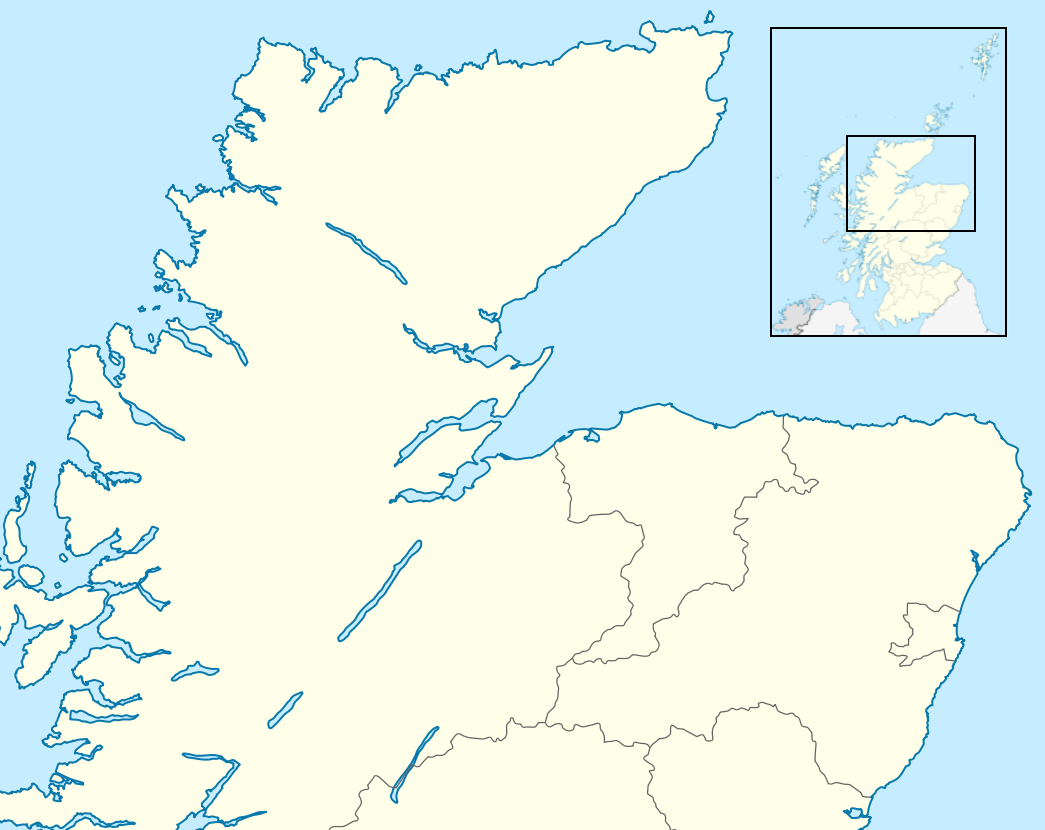
Location of teams in 2018–19 North Caledonian League

Team	Location	Home ground	Ref.
Alness United	Alness	Highland Football Academy, Dingwall	
Bunillidh Thistle	Helmsdale	Couper Park	
Golspie Sutherland	Golspie	King George V Park	
Halkirk United	Halkirk	Morrison Park	
Invergordon	Invergordon	Recreation Grounds	
Inverness Athletic	Inverness	Inverness Royal Academy 4G	
Orkney	Kirkwall	Kirkwall Grammar School 3G	
St Duthus	Tain	Grant Park	
Thurso	Thurso	Sir George's Park	

== League table ==
Pos	Team	Pld	W	D	L	GF	GA	GD	Pts
1	Golspie Sutherland (C)	16	11	3	2	38	15	+23	36
2	Invergordon	16	11	1	4	44	19	+25	34
3	Orkney	16	10	3	3	40	19	+21	33
4	Alness United	16	8	2	6	42	31	+11	26
5	Inverness Athletic	16	8	1	7	40	34	+6	25
6	St Duthus	16	6	3	7	35	36	−1	21
7	Thurso	16	4	5	7	32	35	−3	17
8	Halkirk United	16	3	2	11	15	43	−28	11
9	Bunillidh Thistle	16	1	0	15	21	75	−54	3

Updated to match(es) played on 6 April 2019. Source: North Caledonian Football League
Rules for classification: 1) Points; 2) Goal difference; 3) Number of goals scored.
(C) Champions
