= 2021–22 North Caledonian Football League =

North Caledonian Football League
- Season: 2021–22
- Dates: 21 August 2021 – 16 April 2022
- Champions: Invergordon
- Matches: 110
- Goals: 453 (4.12 per match)
- Biggest home win: Golspie Sutherland 9–0 Bonar Bridge (2 October 2021)
- Biggest away win: Orkney 1–8 Golspie Sutherland (25 September 2021)
- Highest scoring: 4 matches: 9 goals (Note: The matches were Orkney 1–8 Golspie Sutherland on 25 September 2021, Golspie Sutherland 9–0 Bonar Bridge on 2 October 2021, Golspie Sutherland 7–2 Thurso on 3 December 2021 and Loch Ness 6–3 Inverness Athletic on 11 December 2021.)
- Longest winning run: 8 matches: Loch Ness
- Longest unbeaten run: 8 matches: Loch Ness
- Longest winless run: 11 matches: Alness United
- Longest losing run: 10 matches: Nairn County A
- All statistics correct as of 16 April 2022.

The 2021–22 North Caledonian Football League (known for sponsorship reasons as the Macleod & MacCallum North Caledonian League) was the 113th season of the North Caledonian Football League, and the first season as the sixth tier of the Scottish football pyramid system.

Invergordon won the league title for the sixth time, with a 1–0 victory over Orkney on 2 April 2022 securing an unassailable five-point lead over long-time league leaders Loch Ness, ahead of Loch Ness' final league game. Following a Scottish FA rule change in June 2020, champions Invergordon were awarded a place in the preliminary round of the 2022–23 Scottish Cup.

== Teams ==
Location of Orkney in the 2021–22 North Caledonian League
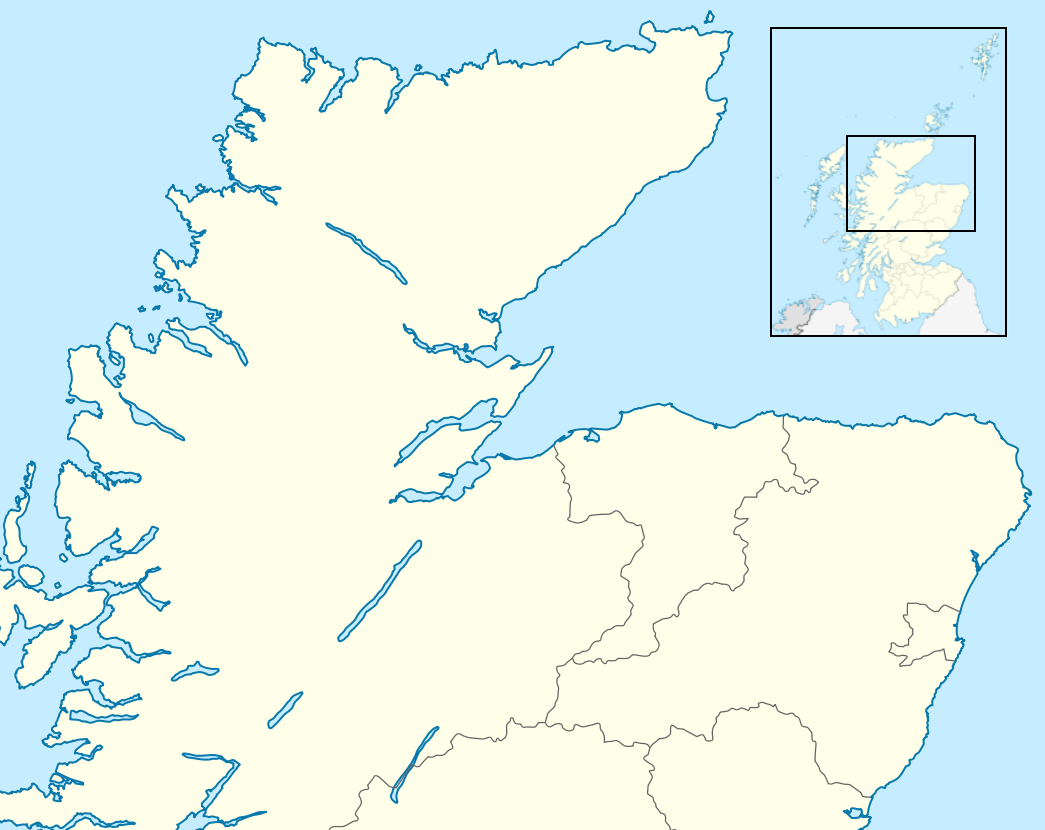
Location of mainland teams in the 2021–22 North Caledonian League

=== Stadia and locations ===
Team	Location	Home ground	Capacity	Seats	Floodlit
Alness United	Alness	Dalmore Park	TBC	0	No
Bonar Bridge	Bonar Bridge	Migdale Playing Fields	500	0	No
Golspie Sutherland ^{[SFA]}	Golspie	King George V Park	1,000	0	Yes
Halkirk United	Halkirk	Morrison Park	1,000	0	Yes
Invergordon	Invergordon	Recreation Grounds	500	0	No
Inverness Athletic	Inverness	Inverness Royal Academy	500	0	No
Loch Ness	Fortrose	King George V Park	500	0	No
Nairn County 'A'	Nairn	Riverside Park	500	0	No
Orkney	Holm	The Rockworks	1,000	0	No
St Duthus	Tain	Grant Park	500	0	No
Thurso	Thurso	Sir George's Park	1,000	0	No

=== Withdrew ===
Having withdrawn from the 2020–21 North Caledonian Football League, Bunillidh Thistle announced their intention to withdraw from the 2021–22 season as well, in June 2021. In the week leading up to the start of the season, Scourie also resigned their membership of the North Caledonian Football Association.

Team	Location	Home ground	Ref.
Bunillidh Thistle	Helmsdale	Couper Park	
Scourie	Scourie	Achlochan Park	

== League table ==
Pos	Team	Pld	W	D	L	GF	GA	GD	Pts	Promotion or qualification
1	Invergordon (C)	20	14	3	3	43	24	+19	45	Ineligible for the Highland League play-off
2	Loch Ness	20	14	1	5	52	27	+25	43	
3	Halkirk United	20	13	1	6	58	35	+23	40	
4	Golspie Sutherland	20	11	5	4	55	27	+28	38	
5	St Duthus	20	10	4	6	47	40	+7	34	
6	Orkney	20	11	1	8	41	36	+5	34	
7	Thurso (Note: Thurso deducted 3 points for fielding an ineligible player in their match on 12 March against Nairn County A.)	20	8	1	11	37	43	−6	22	
8	Nairn County A (Note: Nairn County A awarded 3 points, after Thurso fielded an ineligible player in their match on 12 March.)	20	5	0	15	26	57	−31	18	Ineligible for promotion
9	Inverness Athletic	20	4	4	12	43	54	−11	16	
10	Alness United	20	3	4	13	31	45	−14	13	
11	Bonar Bridge	20	3	4	13	20	65	−45	13	

Source: North Caledonian Football League
Rules for classification: 1) Points; 2) Goal difference; 3) Goals scored
(C) Champions

== Notes ==
^{SFA} Club with an SFA Licence (as of May 2021) eligible to participate in the Highland League play-off should they win the league.
