= 2019–20 North Caledonian Football League =

North Caledonian Football League
- Season: 2019–20
- Dates: 7 September 2019 – 28 March 2020
- Matches: 57
- Goals: 343 (6.02 per match)
- Biggest home win: Golspie Sutherland 13–0 Bonar Bridge; (9 November 2019)
- Biggest away win: Bonar Bridge 1–13 Orkney; (28 December 2019)
- Highest scoring: Bonar Bridge 1–13 Orkney; (28 December 2019)
- Longest winning run: 8 games: Invergordon
- Longest unbeaten run: 10 games: Golspie Sutherland
- Longest winless run: 14 games: Bonar Bridge
- Longest losing run: 14 games: Bonar Bridge

The 2019–20 North Caledonian Football League (known for sponsorship reasons as the Macleod & MacCallum North Caledonian League) was the 111th season of the North Caledonian Football League. The season began on 7 September 2019 and was declared void due to the COVID-19 pandemic in Scotland on 18 May 2020. Golspie Sutherland were the defending champions. Alness United entered a period of abeyance and therefore will not play in the league from this season onwards though the number of entrants remained at nine as Bonar Bridge were reformed for the start of the season.

== Teams ==
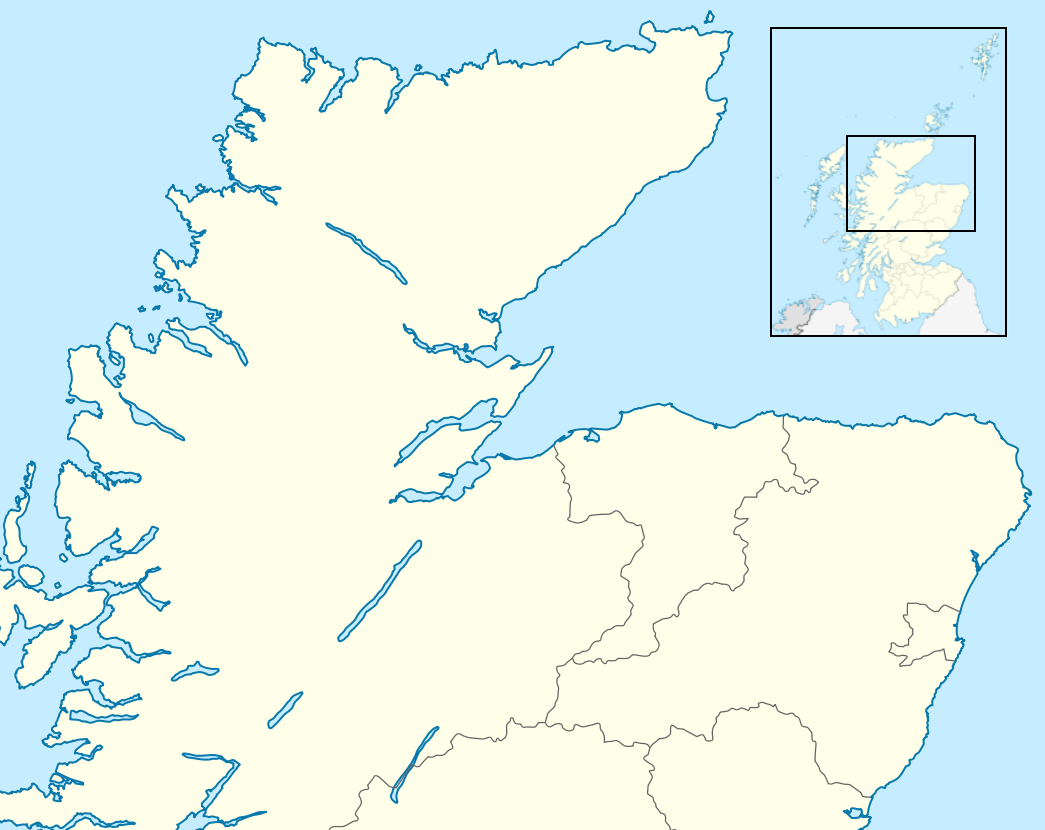
Location of teams in 2019–20 North Caledonian League

Team	Location	Home ground	Ref.
Bonar Bridge	Bonar Bridge	Migdale Playing Fields	
Bunillidh Thistle	Helmsdale	Couper Park	
Golspie Sutherland	Golspie	King George V Park	
Halkirk United	Halkirk	Morrison Park	
Invergordon	Invergordon	Recreation Grounds	
Inverness Athletic	Inverness	Inverness Royal Academy 4G	
Orkney	Kirkwall	Kirkwall Grammar School 3G	
St Duthus	Tain	Grant Park	
Thurso	Thurso	Sir George's Park	

== League table at time of abandonment ==
Pos	Team	Pld	W	D	L	GF	GA	GD	Pts
1	Invergordon	13	11	0	2	60	12	+48	33
2	Thurso	13	9	2	2	44	23	+21	29
3	Golspie Sutherland	11	8	2	1	60	16	+44	26
4	St Duthus	12	8	0	4	46	15	+31	24
5	Orkney	10	6	2	2	43	11	+32	20
6	Halkirk United	15	5	2	8	34	45	−11	17
7	Inverness Athletic	15	4	0	11	34	50	−16	12
8	Bunillidh Thistle	11	2	0	9	12	57	−45	6
9	Bonar Bridge	14	0	0	14	10	114	−104	0

Source: North Caledonian Football League
Rules for classification: 1) Points; 2) Goal difference; 3) Number of goals scored.
