= 2014–15 North Caledonian Football League =

North Caledonian Football League
- Season: 2014–15
- Champions: Golspie Sutherland

The 2014–15 North Caledonian Football League was competed for by six clubs playing ten matches each (a total of 30 league matches). The championship was won by Golspie Sutherland. As the remaining senior league in Scottish football yet to have been integrated into the pyramid system, there was no possible promotion available for the victor.

== Teams ==
Team	Location	Home ground	Capacity	Ref.
Alness United	Alness	Dalmore Park	1,000	
Golspie Sutherland	Golspie	King George V Park	1,000	
Halkirk United	Halkirk	Morrison Park	1,000	
Orkney	Kirkwall	The Pickaquoy Centre	500	
Sutherland United	Dornoch	Meadows Park	1,000	
Thurso	Thurso	Sir Georges Park	1,000	

Location of teams in 2014–15 North Caledonian Football League within Scotland
Not shown: Orkney on Orkney Island

== League table ==
Pos	Team	Pld	W	D	L	GF	GA	GD	Pts
1	Golspie Sutherland	10	6	4	0	29	15	+14	22
2	Orkney	10	5	4	1	24	10	+14	19
3	Halkirk United	10	4	4	2	22	17	+5	16
4	Thurso	10	3	4	3	23	16	+7	13
5	Alness United	10	3	2	5	13	28	−15	11
6	Sutherland United	10	0	0	10	9	34	−25	0

Updated to match(es) played on 4 April 2015. Source: North Caledonian Football League
Rules for classification: 1) Points; 2) Goal difference; 3) Number of goals scored
