= 2017–18 North Caledonian Football League =

North Caledonian Football League
- Season: 2017–18
- Dates: 2 September 2017 – 21 April 2018
- Champions: Orkney
- Matches: 72
- Goals: 349 (4.85 per match)
- Top goalscorer: Thorfinn Stout (20 goals)
- All statistics correct as of 21 April 2018.

The 2017–18 North Caledonian Football League was the 109th season of the North Caledonian Football League. The season began on 2 September 2017 and ended on 21 April 2018. Invergordon were the defending champions.

Bunillidh Thistle returned to the league following an eight-year absence, increasing the league membership to nine teams.

Orkney won their first league title, becoming the first Scottish Islands club to win a Scottish FA affiliated senior league.

== Teams ==
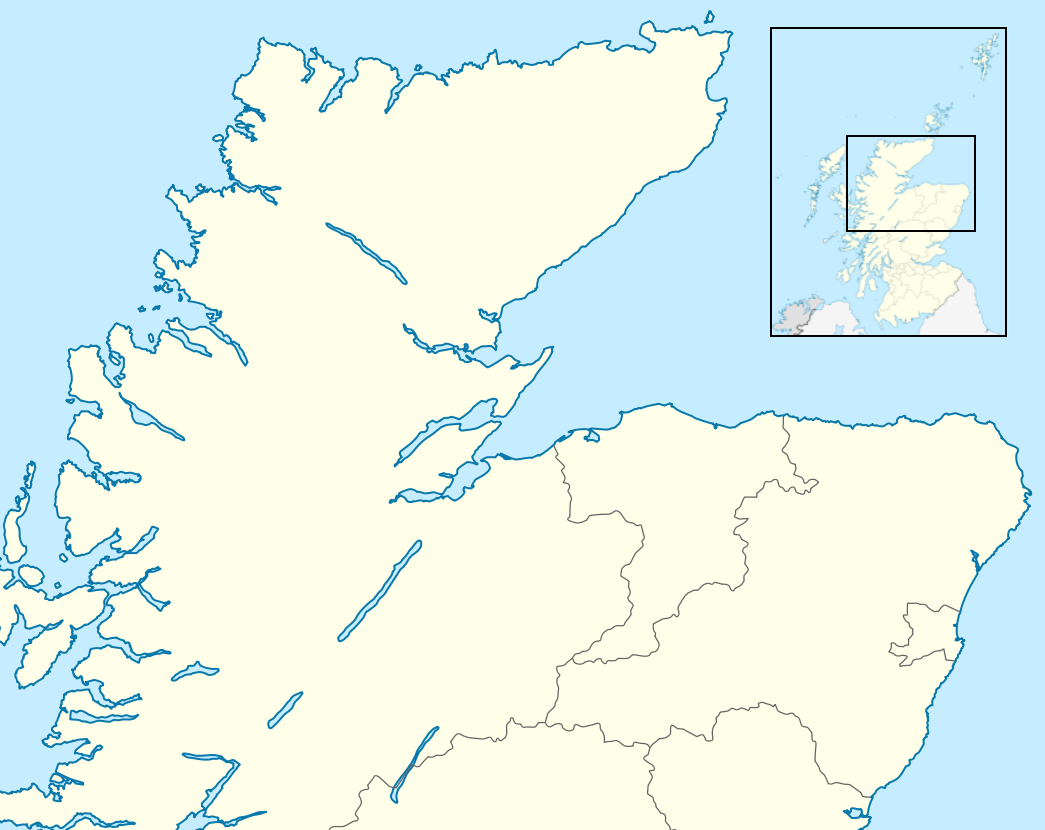
Location of teams in 2017–18 North Caledonian League

Team	Location	Team Manager	Top Scorer	Home ground	Ref.
Alness United	Alness	Tommy Regan	Gordon Finlayson (6)	Dalmore Park	
Bunillidh Thistle	Helmsdale	Graham Grant	Billy Cairns (2)	Couper Park	
Golspie Sutherland	Golspie	Andrew Banks	Liam Bremner (9)	King George V Park	
Halkirk United	Halkirk	Gordon Macdonald	Marc Gunn (5)	Morrison Park	
Invergordon	Invergordon	Gary Campbell	Ryan MacLeod (12)	Recreation Grounds	
Inverness Athletic	Muir of Ord	Tommy Wilson / Shane Carling	Phil MacDonald (8)	Pavilion Park	
Orkney	Kirkwall	Charlie Alway	Thorfinn Stout (20)	The Pickaquoy Centre	
St Duthus	Tain	Stuart Ross	Finn As-Chainey (6)	Links Playing Fields	
Thurso	Thurso	Stevie Reid	Nigel Mackenzie (7)	Sir George's Park	

== League table ==
Pos	Team	Pld	W	D	L	GF	GA	GD	Pts
1	Orkney (C)	16	13	0	3	82	16	+66	39
2	Invergordon	16	12	2	2	48	21	+27	38
3	Golspie Sutherland	16	11	2	3	51	23	+28	35
4	Thurso	16	9	2	5	38	23	+15	29
5	Alness United	16	8	1	7	31	55	−24	25
6	St Duthus	16	4	2	10	28	28	0	14
7	Inverness Athletic	16	4	1	11	31	56	−25	13
8	Halkirk United	16	4	1	11	23	54	−31	13
9	Bunillidh Thistle	16	1	1	14	17	73	−56	4

Source: North Caledonian Football League
Rules for classification: 1) Points; 2) Goal difference; 3) Number of goals scored.
(C) Champions

== Results ==
Home \ Away	ALN	BUN	GOL	HAL	INV	INA	ORK	STD	THU
Alness United		4–0	1–4	2–1	3–2	3–2	2–3	4–3	1–4
Bunillidh Thistle	1–2		1–3	1–2	2–2	0–2	0–6	3–2	0–3
Golspie Sutherland	10–0	5–1		2–1	1–2	3–1	2–3	3–0	4–1
Halkirk United	5–6	3–2	1–4		1–3	4–2	1–5	0–7	2–2
Invergordon	7–0	7–0	2–2	3–0		5–2	1–0	2–1	3–2
Inverness Athletic	1–1	9–2	1–4	3–1	2–3		0–4	2–1	1–3
Orkney	10–0	12–1	7–1	9–0	2–3	13–1		2–1	2–3
St Duthus	1–2	4–1	0–0	3–0	2–3	2–1	0–2		1–3
Thurso	1–0	7–2	1–3	0–1	1–0	7–1	0–2	0–0	

Updated to match(es) played on 21 April 2018. Source: North Caledonian FA
Legend: Blue = home team win; Yellow = draw; Red = away team win.
