= Football Times Cup =

Association football competition in Scotland

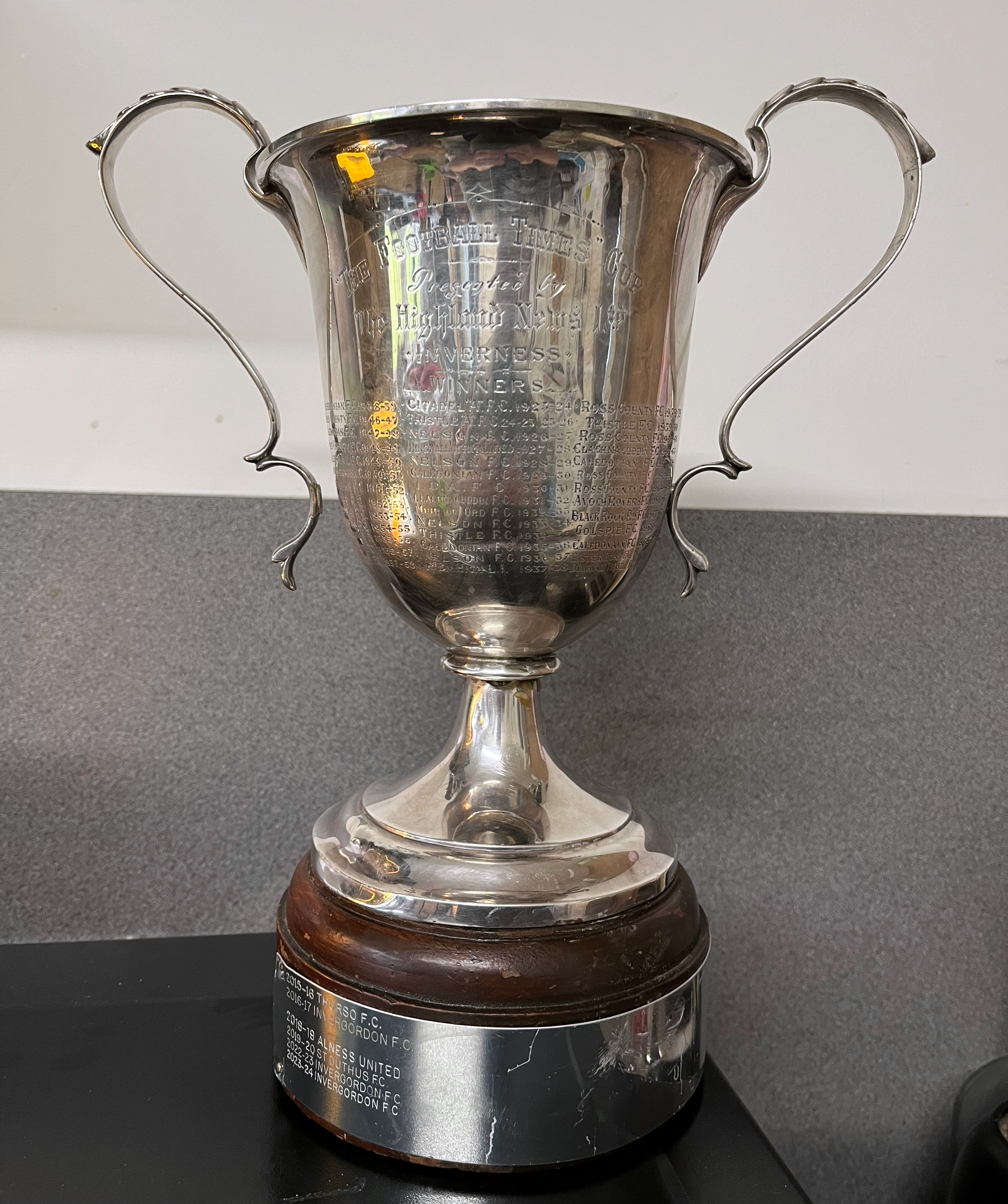
The Football Times Cup, first introduced in 1923 by Highland News Ltd, who published an early 20th century newspaper of the same name.

The Football Times Cup is an annual association football cup for competition between football clubs across the Highlands & Islands of Scotland.

The cup is a registered Scottish FA competition which runs under the auspices of the North Caledonian FA.

== Origins ==
The Football Times Cup was named after "The Football Times" – a Saturday evening football results and general news print newspaper produced by Highland News Ltd for distribution in Inverness and surrounding counties, from 1888 until the late 1960s. The title made a brief return in the 1990s as a supplement of Highland News Group publications, including the Highland News, North Star and Lochaber News, but was again fazed out and ceased to exist by the 2000s.

First introduced the 1923–24 season, the sterling silver Football Times Cup was donated by Highland News Ltd for competition between clubs connected to the North of Scotland Junior FA. During its first two seasons, it was competed for by members of the Highland Alliance, a reserve league consisting of the 2nd XIs of Highland League clubs.

Until the 1970s, the trophy was traditionally presented to the winning captain by the editor of the newspaper, or a representative from Highland News.

The Football Times Cup remains the second oldest cup competition to come under the auspices of the North of Scotland Junior FA (now known as the North Caledonian League), the oldest being the North Caledonian Cup.

== History ==
At the time of the Football Times Cup's introduction, the North of Scotland Junior FA's membership was made up in the majority by Highland Football League reserve sides, or 'A' combinations, from Inverness or Nairn, along with a select group of junior clubs, such as Nelson, Dingwall Victoria United (who later became Ross County) and Muir of Ord Rovers.

Highland League 'A' sides continued to dominate the competition until the 1960s when the league's presence grew across the Highlands and membership from clubs outside of the central Highlands increased.

During the 1993–94 season, with an unprecedented 16 teams holding membership and some clubs facing a campaign of over 40 games, the North Caledonian FA elected to play the Football Times Cup as a seven-a-side competition.

Although the format was popular with teams, it immediately returned to an 11-a-side competition the following season.

In 2019–20, the trophy was played for across a group format, split between the North and South of its competing members, along with guest club Lewis & Harris. After all group games were played, the winners of each group played in the final.

== Past winners ==
Season	Winner	Score	Runner-up	Venue	Notes
2025–26	Halkirk United ^{[2]}	2–0	Alness United	King George V Park, Golspie	
2024–25	Inverness Athletic	3–1	Alness United	Dalmore Park, Alness	
2023–24	Invergordon ^{[9]}	3–2	Inverness Athletic	King George V Park, Golspie	
2022–23	Invergordon ^{[8]}	3–1	St Duthus	King George V Park, Golspie	
2021–22	Thurso ^{[3]}	2–2 ^{p}	Halkirk United	Harmsworth Park, Wick	Thurso won 3–2 on penalties
2020–21	Competition not completed due to suspension of football activities as a result of COVID-19 outbreak				
2019–20	St Duthus ^{[3]}	3–2	Golspie Sutherland	Dudgeon Park, Brora	North and South group stages as opposed to knockout format
2018–19	Alness United ^{[2]}	3–2	Golspie Sutherland	Couper Park, Helmsdale	
2017–18	Orkney ^{[2]}	2–0	Lewis & Harris	King George V Park, Golspie	First ever all-island final
2016–17	Invergordon ^{[7]}	2–0	Thurso	Couper Park, Helmsdale	
2015–16	Thurso ^{[2]}	2–0	Golspie Sutherland	Couper Park, Helmsdale	
2014–15	Golspie Sutherland ^{[5]}	2–0	Orkney	Sir George's Park, Thurso	
2013–14	Golspie Sutherland ^{[4]}	2–1	Thurso	Morrison Park, Halkirk	
2012–13	Golspie Sutherland ^{[3]}	3–2	Orkney		
2011–12	Muir of Ord Rovers ^{[6]}	3–0	Halkirk United		
2010–11	Muir of Ord Rovers ^{[5]}	2–1	Dingwall Thistle		
2009–10	Dingwall Thistle ^{[4]}	3–2	Halkirk United		
2008–09	Halkirk United	2–0	Golspie Sutherland		
2007–08	Balintore ^{[5]}	3–1	Golspie Sutherland		
2006–07	Inverness City	3–2	Golspie Sutherland		
2005–06	Invergordon ^{[6]}				
2004–05	Golspie Sutherland ^{[2]}				
2003–04	Balintore ^{[4]}				
2002–03	Thurso	1–0	Halkirk United	Sir George's Park, Thurso	
2001–02	Bunillidh Thistle ^{[2]}	2–1	Bonar Bridge		
2000–01	Alness United				
1999–00	Invergordon ^{[5]}				
1998–99	Caledonian Thistle 'A'		Golspie Sutherland	Alness	
1997–98	Balintore ^{[3]}	2–1	Alness United	Grant Park, Tain	
1996–97	Ross County 'A' ^{[8]}		Clachnacuddin 'A'		
1995–96	Ross County 'A' ^{[7]}		Bunillidh Thistle		
1994–95	Clachnacuddin 'A' ^{[8]}				
1993–94	Ross County 'A' ^{[6]}				Played as a 7-a-side competition
1992–93	Clachnacuddin 'A' ^{[7]}	4–2	Inverness Thistle 'A'		After extra time
1991–92	Clachnacuddin 'A' ^{[6]}	4–2	Balintore	Crawl Park, Alness	
1990–91	Invergordon ^{[4]}	3–1	Balintore	Victoria Park, Dingwall	
1989–90	Invergordon ^{[3]}		Balintore	Crawl Park, Alness	After extra time and penalties
1988–89	Balintore ^{[2]}	2–2 ^{p}	Invergordon		After extra time Balintore won 7–6 on penalties
1987–88	Invergordon ^{[2]}		Fearn Thistle		
1986–87	Bunillidh Thistle				
1985–86	Muir of Ord Rovers ^{[4]}				
1984–85	Dingwall Thistle ^{[3]}				
1983–84	Fort William				
1982–83	Balintore				
1981–82	Tain St Duthus ^{[2]}	2–0	Balintore	Fearn	
1980–81	Tain St Duthus	3–0	Wick Academy	Dudgeon Park, Brora	
1979–80	Muir of Ord Rovers ^{[3]}				
1978–79	Wick Academy ^{[2]}				
1977–78	Muir of Ord Rovers ^{[2]}	2–2 ^{p}	Tain St Duthus		Muir of Ord won on penalties
1976–77					
1975–76	Dingwall Thistle ^{[2]}				
1974–75	Invergordon				
1973–74	Brora Rangers 'A'				
1972–73	Wick Academy				
1971–72	Dingwall Thistle				
1970–71	Easter Ross	2–0	Caledonian 'A'	Grant Street Park, Inverness	
1969–70	Caledonian 'A' ^{[10]}				
1968–69	Golspie Sutherland				
1967–68	Black Rock Rovers				
1966–67	Avoch Rovers				
1965–66					
1964–65	Ross County 'A' ^{[5]}				
1963–64	Caledonian 'A' ^{[9]}				
1962–63	Clachnacuddin 'A' ^{[5]}				
1961–62					
1960–61	Ross County 'A' ^{[4]}		Caledonian 'A'	Telford Street Park, Inverness	
1959–60	Inverness Thistle 'A' ^{[5]}	2–1	Caledonian 'A'	Grant Street Park, Inverness	Played on New Year's Day
1958–59	Ross County 'A' ^{[3]}		Caledonian 'A'	Telford Street Park, Inverness	
1957–58	Nairn County 'A'		Inverness Thistle 'A'	Telford Street Park, Inverness	
1956–57	Clachnacuddin 'A' ^{[4]}	4–0	Invergordon	Telford Street Park, Inverness	
1955–56	Clachnacuddin 'A' ^{[3]}				
1954–55	Caledonian 'A' ^{[8]}				
1953–54	Caledonian 'A' ^{[7]}				
1952–53	Inverness Thistle 'A' ^{[4]}				
1951–52	Caledonian 'A' ^{[6]}				
1950–51	Clachnacuddin 'A' ^{[2]}				
1949–50	Caledonian 'A' ^{[5]}				
1948–49	Ross County 'A' ^{[2]}				
1947–48	Caledonian 'A' ^{[4]}				
1946–47	Ross County 'A'				
1938–39	Caledonian 'A' ^{[3]}				
1937–38	Highland Light Infantry	4–2	Muir of Ord Rovers	Kingsmills Park, Inverness	
1936–37	Nelson (Inverness) ^{[4]}				
1935–36	Caledonian 'A' ^{[2]}				
1934–35	Inverness Thistle 'A' ^{[3]}	3–1	Highland Light Infantry	Kingsmills Park, Inverness	
1933–34	Nelson (Inverness) ^{[3]}	2–0	Inverness Thistle 'A'	Telford Street Park, Inverness	
1932–33	Muir of Ord Rovers	2–0	Clachnacuddin 'A'	Telford Street Park, Inverness	
1931–32	Clachnacuddin 'A'		Nelson (Inverness)		Replayed at the beginning of the 1932–33 season after tie ended 2–2 at end of season.
1930–31	Inverness District Asylum				
1929–30	Caledonian 'A'				
1928–29	Nelson (Inverness) ^{[2]}				
1927–28	Dingwall Victoria United				
1926–27	Nelson (Inverness)				First non-Highland League side to win the cup.
1925–26	Inverness Thistle 'A' ^{[2]}				
1924–25	Inverness Thistle 'A'				
1923–24	Inverness Citadel 'A'				

== Performance by club ==
Club	Wins	Years
Caledonian 'A'	10	1929–30, 1935–36, 1938–39, 1947–48, 1949–50, 1951–52, 1953–54, 1954–55, 1963–64, 1969–70
Invergordon	9	1974–75, 1987–88, 1989–90, 1990–91, 1999–00, 2005–06, 2016–17, 2022–23, 2023–24
Ross County 'A'	8	1946–47, 1948–49, 1958–59, 1960–61, 1964–65, 1993–94, 1995–96, 1996–97
Clachnacuddin 'A'	8	1931–32, 1950–51, 1955–56, 1956–57, 1962–63, 1991–92, 1992–93, 1994–95
Muir of Ord Rovers	6	1932–33, 1977–78, 1979–80, 1985–86, 2010–11, 2011–12
Golspie Sutherland	5	1968–69, 2004–05, 2012–13, 2013–14, 2014–15
Balintore	5	1982–83, 1988–89, 1997–98, 2003–04, 2007–08
Inverness Thistle 'A'	5	1924–25, 1925–26, 1934–35, 1952–53, 1959–60
Dingwall Thistle	4	1971–72, 1975–76, 1984–85, 2009–10
Nelson (Inverness)	4	1926–27, 1928–29, 1933–34, 1936–37
Thurso	3	2002–03, 2015–16, 2021–22
St Duthus	3	1980–81, 1981–82, 2019–20
Halkirk United	2	2007–08, 2025–26
Alness United	2	2000–01, 2018–19
Orkney	2	2014–15, 2017–18
Bunillidh Thistle	2	1986–87, 2001–02
Wick Academy	2	1972–73, 1978–79
Inverness Athletic	1	2024–25
Inverness City	1	2006–07
Caledonian Thistle 'A'	1	1998–99
Fort William	1	1983–84
Brora Rangers 'A'	1	1973–74
Easter Ross	1	1970–71
Black Rock Rovers	1	1967–68
Avoch Rovers	1	1966–67
Nairn County 'A'	1	1957–58
1st Battalion Highlanders	1	1937–38
Inverness District Asylum	1	1930–31
Dingwall Victoria United	1	1927–28
Inverness Citadel 'A'	1	1923–24
