= 2015–16 North Caledonian Football League =

North Caledonian Football League
- Season: 2015–16
- Champions: Halkirk United
- Top goalscorer: Mark Lamont (27)

The 2015–16 North Caledonian Football League was competed for by six clubs playing ten matches each. Golspie Sutherland were the defending champions. Invergordon returned to the league following a two-year absence. Sutherland United withdrew from the league prior to the start of the season.

== Teams ==
Team	Location	Home ground	Capacity	Ref.
Alness United	Alness	Dalmore Park	1,000	
Golspie Sutherland	Golspie	King George V Park	1,000	
Halkirk United	Halkirk	Morrison Park	1,000	
Invergordon	Invergordon	Recreation Grounds	1,000	
Orkney	Kirkwall	The Pickaquoy Centre	500	
Thurso	Thurso	Sir Georges Park	1,000	

Location of teams in 2015–16 North Caledonian Football League within Scotland
Not shown: Orkney on Orkney Island

== League table ==
Pos	Team	Pld	W	D	L	GF	GA	GD	Pts
1	Halkirk United	10	7	0	3	23	12	+11	21
2	Golspie Sutherland	10	5	4	1	27	15	+12	19
3	Thurso	10	4	4	2	17	14	+3	16
4	Orkney	10	4	2	4	16	19	−3	14
5	Invergordon	10	2	3	5	11	17	−6	9
6	Alness United	10	0	3	7	10	27	−17	3

Updated to match(es) played on 26 March 2016. Source: North Caledonian Football League
Rules for classification: 1) Points; 2) Goal difference; 3) Number of goals scored
