= 2025–26 North Caledonian Football League =

North Caledonian Football League
- Season: 2025–26
- Dates: 9 August 2025 – 18 April 2026 (Note: One match between Fort William and Halkirk United was not played.)
- Champions: Invergordon
- Promoted: Invergordon
- Matches: 131
- Goals: 548 (4.18 per match)
- Biggest home win: 4 matches: 8 goals (Note: The matches were Invergordon 8–0 Orkney on 23 August 2025, Invergordon 8–0 Fort William on 29 November 2025, Clachnacuddin 'A' 10–2 Halkirk United on 6 December 2025, and Fort William 11–3 Orkney on 11 April 2026.)
- Biggest away win: Thurso 1–8 Invergordon (16 August 2025)
- Highest scoring: Fort William 11–3 Orkney (11 April 2026)
- Longest winning run: 19 matches: Invergordon
- Longest unbeaten run: 19 matches: Invergordon
- Longest winless run: 11 matches: Bonar Bridge
- Longest losing run: 6 matches: Clachnacuddin 'A' & Orkney
- All statistics correct as of 18 April 2026.

The 2025–26 North Caledonian Football League (known as the Macleod & MacCallum North Caledonian League for sponsorship reasons) was the 117th season of the North Caledonian Football League, and the fifth season as part of the sixth tier of the Scottish football pyramid system. The defending champions were Invergordon, having won the title for the second consecutive season.

Invergordon retained their title, winning each of their first 16 games, sealing a third consecutive title with a 5–0 win over Orkney on 14 February, to open an unassailable lead over their closest rivals Alness United and Inverness Athletic. Invergordon were scheduled to take part in the Highland League play-off against Rothes, but were promoted directly as a result of a vacancy opening up in the division.

== Teams ==
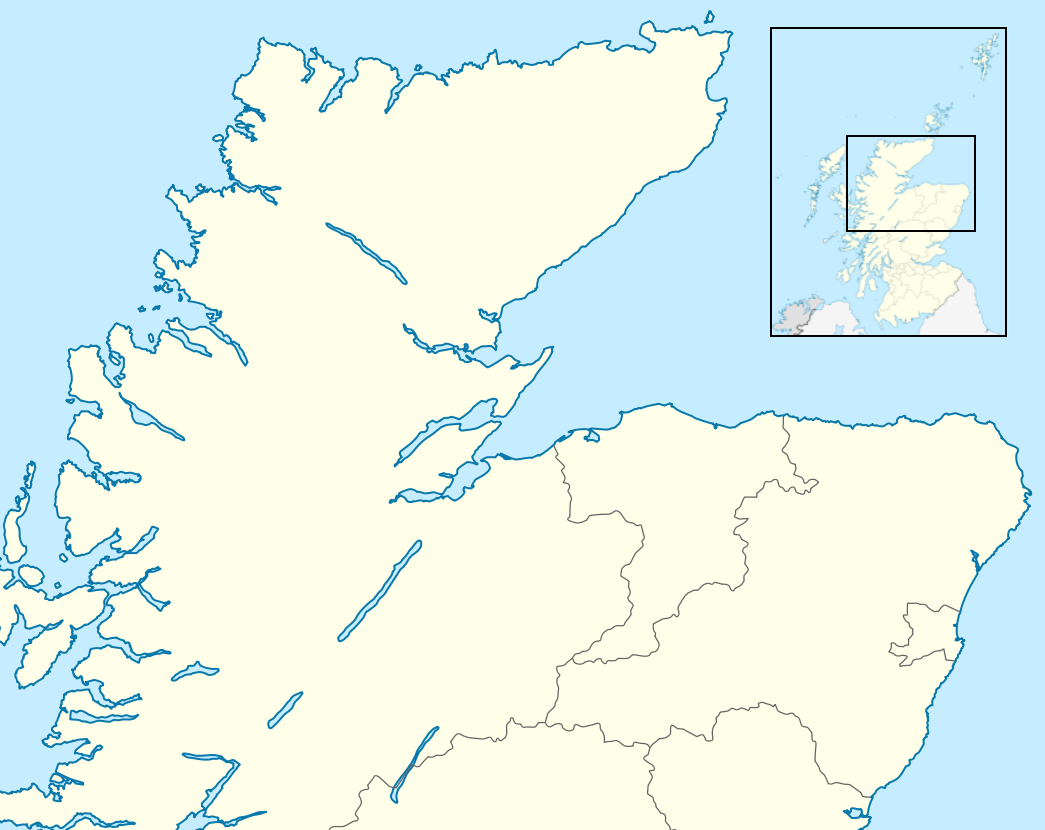
Location of mainland teams in the 2025–26 North Caledonian League
Location of Orkney in the 2025–26 North Caledonian League

Inverness Thistle joined the league for the first time, whilst Bunillidh Thistle withdrew from the league but retained membership in the hopes of playing in the 2026–27 season.

=== From North Caledonian League ===
Withdrew

- Bunillidh Thistle

=== To North Caledonian League ===
Joined

- Inverness Thistle

=== Stadia and locations ===
Team	Location	Home ground	Surface	Capacity	Seats	Floodlit
Alness United	Alness	New Dalmore Park	Artificial	500	0	Yes
Bonar Bridge	Bonar Bridge	Migdale Playing Fields	Grass	500	0	No
Clachnacuddin 'A'	Evanton	Culcairn Park	Grass	500	0	No
Fort William	Fort William	Claggan Park	Grass	1,800	200	Yes
Golspie Sutherland ^{[SFA]}	Golspie	King George V Park	Grass	1,000	0	Yes
Halkirk United	Halkirk	Morrison Park	Grass	1,000	0	Yes
Invergordon ^{[SFA]}	Invergordon	Recreation Grounds	Grass	800	0	No
Inverness Athletic	Muir of Ord	Pavilion Park	Grass	500	0	No
Inverness Thistle	North Kessock	Ferry Brae Park	Grass	500	0	No
Orkney	Kirkwall	Kirkwall Grammar School	Artificial	500	0	Yes
St Duthus	Tain	Grant Park	Grass	500	0	No
Thurso	Thurso	Sir George's Park	Grass	1,000	0	No

^{SFA} Club with an SFA licence eligible to participate in the Highland League promotion play-off should they win the league, and also compete in the Scottish Cup.

=== Withdrew ===
Team	Location	Home ground	Surface	Capacity	Seats	Floodlit
Bunillidh Thistle	Helmsdale	Couper Park	Grass	500	0	No

== League table ==
Invergordon were initially scheduled to play Rothes in the Highland League play-off, but instead were accepted into the Highland League on 2 April 2026 and the play-off was cancelled.

Pos	Team	Pld	W	D	L	GF	GA	GD	Pts	Promotion or qualification
1	Invergordon (C, P)	22	21	0	1	94	15	+79	63	Promotion to the Highland League
2	Alness United	22	14	4	4	45	26	+19	46	
3	Inverness Athletic	22	12	7	3	44	31	+13	43	
4	Thurso	22	10	2	10	50	46	+4	32	
5	Golspie Sutherland	22	10	2	10	38	49	−11	32	
6	Fort William	21	9	4	8	59	50	+9	31	
7	Inverness Thistle	22	8	2	12	30	41	−11	26	
8	Clachnacuddin 'A'	22	7	2	13	43	51	−8	23	Ineligible for promotion
9	Halkirk United	21	6	4	11	50	60	−10	22	
10	Bonar Bridge	22	6	4	12	35	51	−16	22	
11	St Duthus	22	6	2	14	26	52	−26	20	
12	Orkney	22	4	3	15	34	76	−42	15	

Source: North Caledonian Football League
Rules for classification: 1) Points; 2) Goal difference; 3) Goals scored
(C) Champions; (P) Promoted

== Results ==
Home \ Away	ALN	BON	CLA	FOW	GOL	HAL	INV	INA	INT	ORK	STD	THU
Alness United		4–1	2–1	4–3	1–0	7–1	0–2	1–1	3–1	1–3	2–0	1–0
Bonar Bridge	2–3		3–1	1–1	2–4	1–1	0–6	1–2	2–0	3–3	4–1	3–2
Clachnacuddin 'A'	0–2	2–1 (Note: Match played at Grant Street Park, Inverness)		2–3	0–2	10–2	1–5	1–3 (Note: Match played at Dalmore Park, Alness)	0–2	6–1	2–1	3–1
Fort William	0–0	3–1	3–1		5–2 (Note: Match played at Lochaber High School)	N/A	3–4	4–0	5–1	11–3	2–0	3–6
Golspie Sutherland	2–2	1–0	1–0	0–3		1–4	1–3	4–0	0–4	4–1	4–2	1–2
Halkirk United	1–2	6–0	4–4	4–2	2–3		0–2	2–3	3–3	6–0	4–1	0–2
Invergordon	3–0	2–0 (Note: Match played at the Highland Football Academy, Dingwall)	3–0	8–0	6–0	3–0		5–1	2–0	8–0	7–1	3–2
Inverness Athletic	2–1	1–1	3–3	1–1	6–2	5–1	4–0		1–0	2–1	2–1	3–0
Inverness Thistle	1–3	2–1	1–2	2–1	0–0	2–1	0–4	0–2		1–0	2–0	2–0
Orkney	1–2 (Note: Match played at The Rockworks, Holm)	1–2	3–2	4–4 (Note: Match played at Couper Park, Helmsdale)	1–4	4–5 (Note: Match played at Stromness 3G, Stromness)	0–5	1–1	4–2		1–2	0–1
St Duthus	0–0	2–1	1–2	2–0	1–2	4–2	1–5	0–0	3–2	0–1		2–1
Thurso	1–4	3–5	4–0	4–2	4–0	1–1	1–8	1–1	4–2	4–1	6–1	

Legend: Blue = home team win; Yellow = draw; Red = away team win.
