= HUFC =

HUFC may refer to one of the following association football clubs:

In England:

- Hartlepool United F.C.
- Headington United F.C., renamed Oxford United in 1960
- Hereford United F.C.
- Hinckley United F.C.
- Hyde United F.C.
- Hastings United F.C.

In the United States:

- Hollywood United F.C.

In Myanmar:

- Hanthawaddy United F.C.

In Scotland:

- Halkirk United F.C.
- Hurlford United F.C.

In Singapore:

- Hougang United FC

In fiction:

- Harchester United F.C., a fictional club from Sky One's TV series Dream Team
