= Inverness Celtic F.C. =

Former association football club in Scotland

Inverness Celtic
- Full name: Inverness Celtic Football Club
- Nickname(s): Celtic
- Founded: 1896
- Dissolved: 1899

Inverness Celtic Football Club was a Scottish football team from Inverness. They won the North Caledonian Football League in its inaugural season. The following year, in 1897–98, participated in the Highland Football League, finishing fifth out of nine teams, before disappearing, and presumably folding before the turn of the century.
