= Inverness Athletic F.C. =

Association football club in Scotland

Inverness Athletic
- Full name: Inverness Athletic Football Club
- Founded: 2016
- Ground: Inverness Caledonian Thistle Community Hub, Inverness
- Capacity: 500 (0 seated)
- Coordinates: 57°26′54″N 4°13′30″W
- Chairman: Sandy Stephen
- Manager: Vacant
- League: North Caledonian League
- 2025–26: North Caledonian League, 3rd of 12
- Website: invernessathleticfc.co.uk
Home colours	Away colours

Inverness Athletic Football Club is a Scottish football club playing in the North Caledonian Football League currently based in the city of Inverness in the Scottish Highlands.

== History ==
They were formed and admitted to the North Caledonian Football Association in May 2016. In the Summer of 2017, the club were awarded the SFA Quality Mark 'Standard' award.

== Ground ==
The club left its short-lived home at Inverarnie Park in Farr after just a few games in the 2016–17 season and played at Pavilion Park in Muir of Ord for just over two seasons before moving to the 4G facility at Inverness Royal Academy at the beginning of 2019. Inverness Athletic returned to Muir of Ord ahead of the 2020–21 campaign.
The club then temporarily moved to Ardersier for the 2021–22 season, before relocating back to Inverness Royal Academy.

It is expected that, upon completion, Athletic will move to the Inverness Caledonian Thistle Community Trust Development Hub, which will be built nearby to the Inverness Royal Academy.

For the 2025–26 season, Athletic returned to Pavilion Park in Muir of Ord due to the new Inverness Thistle playing at Ferry Brae Park.

From season 2026–27, the club will play their home games at Inverness Caledonian Thistle Community Hub, Inverness.

== Seasons ==
Season	North Caledonian Football League								North of Scotland Cup	North Caledonian Cup	Jock Mackay Cup	Football Times Cup
Season	P	W	D	L	F	A	Pts	Pos	North of Scotland Cup	North Caledonian Cup	Jock Mackay Cup	Football Times Cup
2016–17	14	2	2	10	27	39	8	7th	—	Quarter-finals	Quarter-finals	Quarter-finals
2017–18	16	4	1	11	31	56	13	7th	—	Round 1	Runners-up	Quarter-finals
2018–19	16	8	1	7	40	34	25	5th	—	Quarter-finals	Round 1	Round 1
2019–20	League season declared null and void								—	Withdrew	Semi-finals	Group stage
2020–21	10	5	2	3	20	10	17	9th	—	Round 1	Not held	Not held
2021–22	20	4	4	12	43	54	16	9th	—	Round 1	Not held	Quarter-finals
2022–23	24	13	1	10	50	45	40	7th	—	Quarter-finals	Not held	Round 1
2023–24	22	7	2	13	57	51	23	7th	—	Quarter-finals	Not held	Runners-up
2024–25	22	15	2	5	68	31	47	3rd	Semi-finals	Semi-finals	Not held	Winners
2025–26	22	12	7	3	44	31	43	3rd	—	Quarter-finals	Round 1	Semi-finals

== North Caledonian League Managers ==
The club has had a total of four managers in their North Caledonian League history. Chris Darch was the club's first-ever manager, appointed on 29 May 2016. He had to step down after just seven games in charge due to family reasons. Tommy Wilson took charge of the club after Darch's departure during the club's first-ever season. He went on to steady the Athletic ship and oversaw the club's move from Inverarnie Park to Pavilion Park in Muir of Ord. Wilson left the club after 25 games in charge as Highland League club Strathspey Thistle offered him a change to further his coaching career in the Highland League.

Shane Carling took over on a caretaker basis after Wilson left with a few games remaining of the 2017–18 season. He would go on to lead the club to its first-ever cup final that season, where they lost out to Invergordon. The following season Carling and his coaching team led Athletic to their highest-ever league finish at the time, ending the 2018/19 season in 5th position with 25 points. Carling left the club a few months into the 2019–20 season after 33 games in the dugout.

Jason Golabek became the club's manager on 4 November 2019, after serving as an experienced player and assistant manager. He managed the club for a further two and a half years, in the dugout for 46 games in total. He and his coaching team guided the club through two of the toughest seasons in their short history due to the pandemic, with a highlight finishing 3rd in the 2020–21 Ness Cup League campaign.

Stuart Ross was appointed on 1 May 2022. He joined the club with a wealth of North Caley League experience, having previously managed Tain outfit St Duthus for six years.

== Player records ==
Liam Smith holds the record for the most appearances for Inverness Athletic with 56 appearances, while Phil Macdonald is the club's all-time top goalscorer with 44 goals. Goalkeeper Ryan A Macleod holds the record for the most clean sheets with 10.

Forward Ryan MacLeod holds the record for the most goals in a single season with 14 goals in the 2022–23 season. Meanwhile, Phil Macdonald scored the most goals in a single game when he netted five goals against Bunilidh Thistle on 8 December 2018.

Kieran Goddard is the youngest player to have ever played for Inverness Athletic at just 16 years, 3 months, and 27 days old when he debuted against Nairn County Reserves at Station Park, Nairn on 1 October 2022. In contrast, Martin Bain is the oldest player to have played for the club at 41 years, 4 months, and 22 days old when he played against Halkirk United away on 18 February 2023.

Calum Black scored his first goal for the club at the age of 18 years and 6 days, making him the youngest goalscorer for the club. He scored his goal against Invergordon at Pavilion Park, Muir of Old on 24 November 2018. Meanwhile, Sandy White is the oldest goalscorer in the club's history at 38 years, 11 months, and 9 days old when he scored against St Duthus on 18 March 2023.

== Honours ==
- Football Times Cup
  - Winners: 2024–25
