= North Caledonian Football League =

- Founded: 31 January 1888
- Country: Scotland
- Divisions: 1
- Number of clubs: 12
- Level on pyramid: 6
- Promotion to: Highland Football League
- Domestic cup(s): Scottish Cup (SFA licensed clubs and league winners)
- Current champions: Invergordon (9th title) (2025–26)
- Most championships: Clachnacuddin reserves (14 titles)
- Website: northcaleyfa.co.uk
- Current: 2026–27 North Caledonian Football League

The North Caledonian Football League is a senior football association operating throughout the Highlands and Islands of Scotland and is a recognised body of the Scottish Football Association (SFA) and as such has its senior football competitions officially registered with the SFA.

== History ==
=== North of Scotland Junior FA ===
The formation of the Inverness Junior Football Association on 31 January 1888 saw the introduction of the Inverness Junior Cup. After the final in 1888 the association was renamed the North of Scotland Junior Football Association and the competition the North of Scotland Junior Cup.

The Association's league competition was later introduced in 1896 as the "North of Scotland Junior League" with the initial aim of providing a league format for its junior members and predominantly the "2nd XI" teams from senior Highland Football League clubs. Upon its formation these teams mostly came from the Inverness area. By 1906 though, the Association had welcomed several new member teams from outside the Inverness-shire area, specifically Nairn Thistle and Dingwall Victoria United (later re-formed as Ross County) broadening the coverage of the league across the North. Other clubs from across the Highland counties followed suit, with Muir of Ord and Tore United among those to join.

From 1888 onwards, the winner of the North of Scotland Junior League were presented with the Muirton Challenge Shield - a large shield presented to the winners by the owners of the former Muirton Inn in Inverness. This continued to be presented until around the 1960s when a new trophy was introduced.

=== North of Scotland Reserve (2nd XI) FA ===
In 1935 the league dropped its junior status, possibly due to the Scottish Junior Football Association's objections to Senior clubs involvement, and became known as the North of Scotland "2nd XI" League (it was also known colloquially as either the Highland Reserve League or Highland Alliance, the latter a nod to the southern reserve league the Scottish Football Alliance). It was recognised as a senior football league with teams eligible to apply for Scottish FA membership.

In 1947–48 season, the league's membership consisted of a record 26 clubs, split into a three-division regional set-up with the top clubs in each section playing off for the Championship. In 1948 it reverted to a single division with a much reduced membership.

By the late 1960s/early 1970s, the Highland League reserve teams which had dominated the league gradually dropped out of contention, with most finding that it was not financially viable to run "2nd XI" or reserve teams at a senior level. At the same time, the league began to see an influx of senior football teams joining from the surrounding counties of Easter Ross, Caithness and Sutherland.

=== North Caledonian FA ===
By the 1980s, the league had representation from teams all across the North, including as far as Fort William. In a bid to shake off the "2nd XI" tag (and the inference of being "second best" to the Highland League) the member clubs in the league took the decision to rename the league at the 1984 annual general meeting of the North of Scotland 2nd XI Football Association in Bonar Bridge, where teams voted unanimously to change the name of the association to the North Caledonian Football Association and the name of the league competition to the North Caledonian Football League.

A new league trophy was introduced at the same time, engraved with the new association's name.

In 2020, it was announced that the North Caledonian League was working with the Highland League and North Region Junior FA to form a sixth tier of the Scottish football league system for the far north of the country, with a view to feeding eligible clubs via promotion into the Highland League. It was also announced, along with 4 teams being added to the ranks (2 of which are returning sides) that the league would be temporarily split into two divisions.

In April 2021, it was announced that subject to SFA approval, the North Caledonian League would be joined at Tier 6 by the North Super League and a rebranded Midlands League (the remaining Junior East Region clubs that play in Tayside) to form a fully-integrated tier below the Highland League from the 2021–22 season. The leagues at that level entered the Scottish pyramid later in July.

In June 2022, it was announced that the winner of the league, no matter whether they were SFA Licensed or not, would qualify directly to the Scottish Cup preliminary round, starting with Invergordon, who won the 2021–22 season. However, it was also confirmed that if an already SFA Licensed team (Golspie Sutherland and Fort William) or a reserve team (Clachnacuddin and Nairn County) were to win the league, the Scottish Cup spot would not pass down to the highest ranked team that would otherwise be eligible.

Invergordon became the first team to qualify for the Scottish Cup via this method, however they were beaten 5–1 in their opening game by Newtongrange Star.

=== North Caledonian Football League ===
During the summer of 2026, the league confirmed following the AGM of the Scottish FA that, for the first time in its 138-year history, the league now holds status as a football body within the Scottish FA structure.

== Membership ==
As well as holding membership of the North Caledonian FA, member clubs are also governed by the constitution of the Scottish Football Association, and as such disciplinary and registration matters are handled by the Scottish Football Association. This is a unique situation in that member clubs are not required to be full members of the Scottish Football Association, despite their players holding senior SFA registrations (professional and amateur).

Golspie Sutherland are the only North Caledonian FA member club to hold full membership of the Scottish Football Association and since season 2007–08 they have obtained direct entry to the Scottish Cup. Previously, they were required to enter the Scottish Qualifying Cup (North).

Since 2013, membership has been extended beyond the Highlands to senior clubs in the Islands, with Orkney, Shetland and Lewis & Harris all entering teams.

Member teams have previously included reserve teams of Highland Football League clubs alongside teams from throughout the Highlands and Islands region.

== Competitions ==
=== League ===
A senior Scottish FA recognised body, the North Caledonian Football League is an annual league competition which runs from August to April, with teams playing each other both home and away with a championship team determined after all games have been played.

Over the years, the North Caledonian League has been characterised by the number of clubs who have used it as a 'stepping-stone' to the professional ranks of Scottish football. Among those to have 'graduated' from the league are Wick Academy and Fort William who left to join the Highland Football League, and much earlier Ross County, who played in the league under their former name of Dingwall Victoria United between 1896 and 1929 before renaming to join the Highland Football League.

The league has also been home in recent years to the reserve teams of Scottish Football League clubs Inverness Caledonian Thistle and Ross County, as well as those from Highland League sides, such as Clachnacuddin and Nairn County.

=== Cups ===
The North Caledonian Cup (also previously referred to as the North of Scotland Reserve Cup or PCT North Cup) was the first competition to be contested under the auspices of the North Caledonian FA during the latter part of the 1887–88 season and it remains part of the season calendar today.

Member teams of the North Caledonian FA also compete in the Football Times Cup, which has existed as part of the North Caledonian FA season since the 1920s.

Several other cups have been contested or awarded during the Association's history, each of which are inactive or played for when season time allows:

- Jock Mackay Memorial Cup
- Chic Allan/Port Services Cup
- Morris Newton/SWL Cup
- Ness Cup (revived as the 'Division 2' trophy for the 2020–21 season)

== Member clubs ==
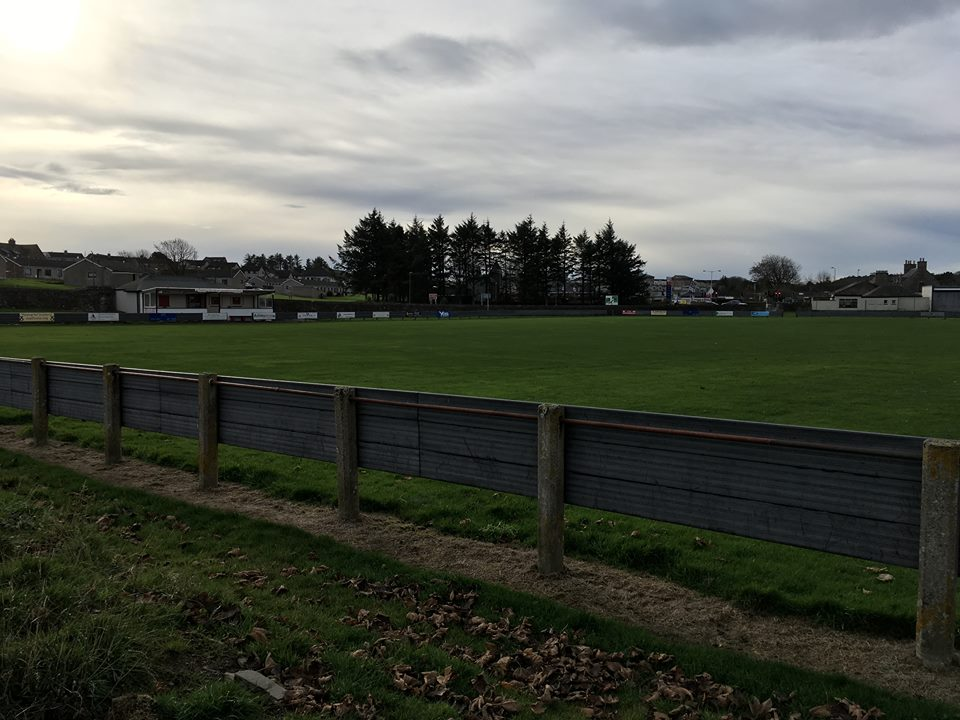
Thurso's home ground, Sir George's Park

=== Member clubs for 2026–27 season ===
| Team | Location | Ground | Ref. |
|---|---|---|---|
| Alness United | Alness | Dalmore Park | |
| Bonar Bridge | Bonar Bridge | Migdale Playing Fields | |
| Bunillidh Thistle | Helmsdale | Couper Park | |
| Clachnacuddin 'A' | Inverness | Bught Park | |
| Dingwall | Dingwall | Highland Football Academy | |
| Fort William | Fort William | Claggan Park | |
| Golspie Sutherland | Golspie | King George V Park | |
| Halkirk United | Halkirk | Morrison Park | |
| Inverness Athletic | Inverness | Inverness CT Community Hub | |
| Inverness Thistle | North Kessock | Ferry Brae Park | |
| Orkney | Kirkwall | Kirkwall Grammar School | |
| St Duthus | Tain | Grant Park | |
| Thurso | Thurso | Sir George's Park | |

*Teams marked in Italics are to be determined

=== Former members ===
Elected/Promoted to the Highland League

- Inverness Celtic, 1897; folded 1899
- Dingwall Victoria United, left 1929; joined Highland League, became Ross County
- Fort William, 1985; relegated back to league 2022
- Wick Academy, 1994
- Invergordon, 2026

Defunct/Withdrew

- Albert, folded presumably due to World War I
- Avoch Rovers, withdrew and name was later adopted by the village's youth sides. Not to be confused with Avoch AFC who currently compete in the Inverness and District AFA
- Balintore, folded 2011
- Black Rock Rovers, left; currently playing in the Inverness and District FA
- Catch-My-Pal, folded likely when the Union club closed
- Dingwall Thistle, withdrew and a second incarnation was formed in 2009 and later folded in 2012
- Dornoch, folded 2008
- Fearn Thistle, folded mid-1990s
- Fortrose and Rosemarkie Union, left; currently playing in the Inverness and District FA
- Inverness and District Asylum, folded unknown
- Loch Ness, folded 2024
- Muir of Ord Rovers, left; currently playing in the Inverness and District FA
- Nelson, folded 1957
- Scourie, folded 2021
- Sutherland United, folded 2015
- Tain Thistle; withdrew 2010; currently playing in the North West Sutherland AFA
  Location of teams in 2026–27 North Caledonian Football League
Location of teams in 2026–27 North Caledonian Football League

== Recent history ==
The 2008–09 season saw the league reduced to ten teams following the withdrawal of Dornoch City and Inverness City joining the Junior leagues. Late applicants Tain Thistle took the league membership up to ten teams for the start of the season. Fort William entered a reserve side in the league for season 2009–10 as the first Highland Football League "reserve" side to compete since 1999. Helmsdale based Bunillidh Thistle withdrew whilst Alness United took a year out, and former members Dingwall Thistle returned to complete a ten-team league. Season 2010–11 saw Alness return after a one-year absence whilst Tain Thistle withdrew after two seasons.

Clachnacuddin again entered a reserve side for season 2011–12, whilst Fort William Reserves dropped out due to problems with pitch availability. Before the season started, both Bonar Bridge and Invergordon withdrew, leaving just eight teams in the league. The following season 2012–13, Invergordon returned while Balintore and Dingwall Thistle both withdrew from the league.

Invergordon again withdrew from competition for the 2013–14 season, however, the void was filled by a new team from Dornoch in Sutherland United. That same season, a newly formed Shetland team and Lewis & Harris both registered for competition in the North Caledonian Cup. The following season, 2014–15, Shetland and Lewis & Harris also competed in the Jock Mackay Cup, while a new team, Orkney, was accepted as a member of the league – the first Islands team to be admitted. Invergordon returned a year later following a two-year period of abeyance, however, along with Muir of Ord Rovers, Sutherland United withdrew from the competition after just their second season, taking the number of competing teams down to six for season 2015–16.

The league experienced an upturn in interest from Highland sides in 2016. A total of eight teams registered for league competition in 2016–17, with St Duthus returning to represent Tain and a new team Inverness Athletic was also accepted. The league grew in numbers again in 2017 with the revival of Bunillidh Thistle after almost ten years absence, and for the 2019–20 season, Bonar Bridge reformed and were admitted to the league.

In 2020, two new clubs, Loch Ness and Scourie joined the league, along with returnees, Nairn County 'A' and Alness United – taking the membership of the league to 13 teams for the first time in over 20 years. For the 2020–21 season, clubs agreed to play in two leagues of six (Bunillidh opted out) during the COVID-19 pandemic as a means of reducing the number of games, with Golspie winning League One, and Alness winning League Two. In 2021–22, Scourie folded after losing all 10 of their games the previous season, and Bunillidh again opted out and Invergordon qualified for the Scottish Cup after winning the title. In 2022–23, Fort William and Clachnacuddin Reserves returned to the league after 36 and 10 years, respectively.

In the 2024–25 season, Loch Ness pulled out before the season began and, for the first time since 2020, Bunillidh Thistle returned to the league, with a new side, Inverness Thistle, entering discussions to join the league for the 2025–26 season.

On 12 June 2025, it was announced that Inverness Thistle would be joining the league. Weeks prior to the start of the 2025–26 season, it was announced that Bunillidh Thistle would again be withdrawing from all league and cup competitions, however would be retaining its membership.

During the 2025–26 season, the NCFA received applications from two new sides to join the league for the 2026–27 season; Dornoch Sutherland, and Dingwall. On 18 February 2026, after winning the league title, Invergordon applied to join the Highland League, in March 2026, with groundworks complete, Invergordon were officially awarded SFA Membership, making them eligible for the Highland League playoff. On 2 April 2026, due to Brechin City's departure to the Lowland League East, regardless of final position, Invergordon were officially promoted to the Highland League for the 2026–27 season with no need for a playoff.

Ahead of the 2026–27 season, on 11 June 2026, Dingwall were officially accepted into the league at the pre-season AGM, alongside renaming the association to the 'North Caledonian Football League'.

== Previous champions ==
| Season | Champion |
|---|---|
| 1896–97 | Inverness Celtic |
| 1897–98 | Inverness Citadel reserves |
| 1898–99 | Nelson |
| 1899–1900 | Nelson |
| 1900–01 | Inverness Thistle reserves |
| 1901–02 | Inverness Citadel reserves |
| 1902–03 | Inverness Citadel reserves |
| 1903–04 | Clachnacuddin reserves |
| 1904–05 | Clachnacuddin reserves |
| 1905–06 | Nelson |
| 1906–07 | Nelson |
| 1907–08 | Nelson |
| 1908–09 | Nelson |
| 1909–10 | Clachnacuddin reserves |
| 1910–11 | Inverness Citadel reserves |
| 1911–12 | Nelson |
| 1912–13 | Nelson |
| 1913–14 | Albert |
| 1914–19 | League cancelled due to WWI |
| 1919–20 | Dingwall Victoria United |
| 1920–21 | Nelson |
| 1921–22 | Inverness Citadel reserves |
| 1922–23 | Caledonian reserves |
| 1923–24 | Fortrose & Rosemarkie Union |
| 1924–25 | Catch-my-Pal |
| 1925–26 | Nelson |
| 1926–27 | Clachnacuddin reserves |
| 1927–28 | Dingwall Victoria United |
| 1928–29 | Inverness Thistle reserves |
| 1929–30 | Clachnacuddin reserves |
| 1930–31 | Inverness Thistle reserves |
| 1931–32 | Clachnacuddin reserves |
| 1932–33 | Inverness District Asylum |
| 1933–34 | Inverness District Asylum |
| 1934–35 | Inverness Thistle reserves |
| 1935–36 | Nairn County reserves |
| 1936–37 | Clachnacuddin reserves |
| 1937–38 | League cancelled |
| 1938–39 | 2nd Highland Light Infantry |
| 1939–46 | League cancelled due to WWII |
| 1946–47 | Invergordon |
| 1947–48 | League incomplete |
| 1948–49 | Caledonian reserves |
| 1949–50 | Clachnacuddin reserves |
| 1950–51 | Clachnacuddin reserves |
| 1951–52 | Caledonian reserves |
| 1952–53 | Caledonian reserves |
| 1953–54 | Elgin City reserves |
| 1954–55 | Nairn County reserves/Buckie Thistle reserves (shared) |
| 1955–56 | Clachnacuddin reserves |
| 1956–57 | Clachnacuddin reserves |
| 1957–58 | Clachnacuddin reserves |
| 1958–59 | Inverness Thistle reserves |
| 1959–60 | Inverness Thistle reserves |
| 1960–61 | League incomplete |
| 1961–62 | League incomplete |
| 1962–63 | Inverness Thistle reserves |
| 1963–64 | Clachnacuddin reserves |
| 1964–65 | Avoch Rovers |
| 1965–66 | Ross County reserves |
| 1966–67 | Brora Rangers reserves |
| 1967–68 | Brora Rangers reserves |
| 1968–69 | Dingwall Thistle |
| 1969–70 | Caledonian reserves |
| 1970–71 | Dingwall Thistle |
| 1971–72 | Dingwall Thistle |
| 1972–73 | Alness United |
| 1973–74 | Alness United |
| 1974–75 | Golspie Sutherland |
| 1975–76 | Golspie Sutherland |
| 1976–77 | Invergordon |
| 1977–78 | Dingwall Thistle |
| 1978–79 | Wick Academy |
| 1979–80 | Wick Academy |
| 1980–81 | Wick Academy |
| 1981–82 | Wick Academy |
| 1982–83 | Bunillidh Thistle |
| 1983–84 | Muir of Ord Rovers |
| 1984–85 | Fort William |
| 1985–86 | Muir of Ord Rovers |
| 1986–87 | Wick Academy |
| 1987–88 | Invergordon |
| 1988–89 | Bunillidh Thistle |
| 1989–90 | Balintore |
| 1990–91 | Balintore |
| 1991–92 | Clachnacuddin reserves |
| 1992–93 | Golspie Sutherland |
| 1993–94 | Halkirk United |
| 1994–95 | Inverness Caledonian Thistle reserves |
| 1995–96 | Fearn Thistle |
| 1996–97 | Ross County reserves |
| 1997–98 | Inverness Caledonian Thistle reserves |
| 1998–99 | Golspie Sutherland |
| 1999–2000 | Thurso |
| 2000–01 | Alness United |
| 2001–02 | Invergordon |
| 2002–03 | Thurso |
| 2003–04 | Golspie Sutherland |
| 2004–05 | Alness United |
| 2005–06 | Balintore |
| 2006–07 | Golspie Sutherland |
| 2007–08 | Golspie Sutherland |
| 2008–09 | Golspie Sutherland |
| 2009–10 | Thurso |
| 2010–11 | Halkirk United |
| 2011–12 | Halkirk United |
| 2012–13 | Thurso |
| 2013–14 | Halkirk United |
| 2014–15 | Golspie Sutherland |
| 2015–16 | Halkirk United |
| 2016–17 | Invergordon |
| 2017–18 | Orkney |
| 2018–19 | Golspie Sutherland |
| 2019–20 | League incomplete due to COVID-19 pandemic |
| 2020–21 | Golspie Sutherland |
| 2021–22 | Invergordon |
| 2022–23 | Loch Ness |
| 2023–24 | Invergordon |
| 2024–25 | Invergordon |
| 2025–26 | Invergordon |
| 2026–27 | |

== Club performance ==
As of end of season 2025–26

| Club | Winners | Season(s) |
|---|---|---|
| **Clachnacuddin reserves** | 14 | 1903–04, 1904–05, 1909–10, 1926–27, 1929–30, 1931–32, 1936–37, 1949–50, 1950–51, 1955–56, 1956–57, 1957–58, 1963–64, 1991–92 |
| **Golspie Sutherland** | 11 | 1974–75, 1975–76, 1992–93, 1998–99, 2003–04, 2006–07, 2007–08, 2008–09, 2014–15, 2018–19, 2020–21 |
| Nelson | 10 | 1898–99, 1899–1900, 1905–06, 1906–07, 1907–08, 1908–09, 1911–12, 1912–13, 1920–21, 1925–26 |
| Invergordon | 9 | 1946–47, 1976–77, 1987–88, 2001–02, 2016–17, 2021–22, 2023–24, 2024–25, 2025–26 |
| Inverness Thistle reserves | 7 | 1900–01, 1928–29, 1930–31, 1934–35, 1958–59, 1959–60, 1962–63 |
| **Halkirk United** | 5 | 1993–94, 2010–11, 2011–12, 2013–14, 2015–16 |
| Inverness Citadel reserves | 5 | 1897–98, 1901–02, 1902–03, 1910–11, 1921–22 |
| Wick Academy | 5 | 1978–79, 1979–80, 1980–81, 1981–82, 1986–87 |
| **Alness United** | 4 | 1972–73, 1973–74, 2000–01, 2004–05 |
| Caledonian reserves | 4 | 1948–49, 1951–52, 1952–53, 1969–70 |
| Dingwall Thistle | 4 | 1968–69, 1970–71, 1971–72, 1977–78 |
| **Thurso** | 4 | 1999–2000, 2002–03, 2009–10, 2012–13 |
| Balintore | 3 | 1989–90, 1990–91, 2005–06 |
| Brora Rangers reserves | 2 | 1966–67, 1967–68 |
| Bunillidh Thistle | 2 | 1982–83, 1988–89 |
| Dingwall Victoria United | 2 | 1919–20, 1927–28 |
| Inverness Caledonian Thistle reserves | 2 | 1994–95, 1997–98 |
| Inverness District Asylum | 2 | 1932–33, 1933–34 |
| Muir of Ord Rovers | 2 | 1983–84, 1985–86 |
| Nairn County reserves | 2 | 1935–36, 1954–55* |
| Ross County reserves | 2 | 1965–66, 1996–97 |
| Albert | 1 | 1913–14 |
| Avoch Rovers | 1 | 1964–65 |
| Buckie Thistle reserves | 1 | 1954–55* |
| Catch-my-Pal | 1 | 1924–25 |
| Elgin City reserves | 1 | 1953–54 |
| Fearn Thistle | 1 | 1995–96 |
| **Fort William** | 1 | 1984–85 |
| Fortrose Union | 1 | 1923–24 |
| 2nd Highland Light Infantry | 1 | 1938–39 |
| Inverness Celtic | 1 | 1896–97 |
| Loch Ness | 1 | 2022–23 |
| **Orkney** | 1 | 2017–18 |

* – Shared title

BOLD indicates the team is currently playing within the NCFA

Italics indicates the team is defunct or merged with another team that does not play in the NCFA

== Annual award winners ==
| Season | Player of the Year | Young Player of the Year | Goalkeeper of the Year | Top Goalscorer |
|---|---|---|---|---|
| 2025-26 | Jonah Martens (Thurso) | Lewis Mackay (Invergordon) | No award | Liam Taylor (Fort William) - 27 |
| 2024-25 | James Ross (Invergordon) | Calum Brown (Invergordon) | Kieran Macleod (Halkirk United) * | Calum Brown (Invergordon) - 18 |
| 2023–24 | Blair Morrison (Invergordon) | Robbie Murray (Golspie Sutherland) | Kit Fletcher (Fort William) * | Sam Urquhart (Loch Ness) – 21 |
| 2022–23 | Ben Kelly (Invergordon) | Gary Pullen (Golspie Sutherland) | No award | Allan MacPhee (Loch Ness) – 29 |
| 2021–22 | Liam Bremner (Golspie Sutherland) | Cameron Montgomery (Thurso) | No award | Liam Bremner (Golspie Sutherland) – 30 |
| 2020–21 | No award | No award | No award | Ben Bruce (St Duthus) – 9 |
| 2019–20 | No award | No award | No award | Liam Bremner (Golspie Sutherland) – 18 |
| 2018–19 | Gordon Finlayson (Alness United) | Shaun Urquhart (Golspie Sutherland) | No award | Darran Goller (Invergordon) – 17 |
| 2017–18 | Thorfinn Stout (Orkney) | Connor Ross (Inverness Athletic) | No award | Thorfinn Stout (Orkney) – 19 |
| 2016–17 | Kai Cruickshank (Invergordon) | Conor Cormack (Thurso) | No award | Lukasz Geruzel (Golspie Sutherland) / Graham Macnab (Halkirk United) – 10 |
| 2015–16 | | Conor Cormack (Thurso) | | Mark Lamont (Golspie Sutherland) – 11 |
| 2014–15 | | | | Shaun Kerr (Golspie Sutherland) – 8 |
| 2013–14 | | | | Shaun Kerr (Golspie Sutherland) – 10 |
| 2012–13 | | | | |
| 2011–12 | Grant MacNab (Halkirk United) | Shaun Robertson (Alness United) | No award | Chris Sutherland (Halkirk United) – 17 |
| 2010–11 | John Mcleod (Dingwall Thistle) | Liam Bremner (Halkirk United) | No award | Mark Nichol (Thurso) – 36 |
| 2009–10 | | | | |
| 2008–09 | Angus Macdonald (Balintore) | Liam Rostock (Bonar Bridge) | No award | Mark Nichol (Halkirk United) |
| 2007–08 | | | | |
| 2006–07 | | | | |
| 2005–06 | | | | |
| 2004–05 | | | | |
| 2003–04 | | | | |
| 2002–03 | | | Michael Gray (Thurso) | |
| 2001–02 | | | Graham Stewart (Invergordon) | |
| 2000–01 | | | Ian Young (Dornoch) | |
| 1999–00 | | | Alan Bokas (Bunillidh Thistle) | |
| 1998–99 | Will Skinner (Balintore) | No award | DJ McCarthy (Tain St Duthus) | Gary Anderson (Golspie Sutherland) – 20 |
| 1997–98 | Gordon Lowe (Balintore) | No award | John Mackenzie (Golspie Sutherland) | Gordon Lowe (Balintore) |
| 1996–97 | Kenny Wood (Balintore) | No award | Kenny Wood (Balintore) | John Black (Golspie Sutherland) – 33 |
| 1995–96 | Steve Murray (Fearn Thistle) | No award | DJ McCarthy (Tain St Duthus) | Billy Read (Fearn Thistle) – 24 |
| 1994–95 | Drew O'Donnell (Fearn Thistle) | No award | Donnie Munro (Balintore) | John O'Brien (Halkirk United) |
| 1993–94 | Eoin Ross (Bonar Bridge) | No award | | Terry Mackay (Halkirk United) – 22 |
| 1992–93 | | | | |
| 1991–92 | James Winter (Tain St Duthus) | No award | | Bruce McNair (Ross County 'A') – 21 |
| 1990–91 | Kenny Taylor (Fearn Thistle) | No award | | Alan Brindle (Balintore) – 26 |
| 1989–90 | | | | |
| 1988–89 | Jim Kennedy (Tain St Duthus) | No award | | |
| 1987–88 | Duggie Norris (Bunillidh Thistle) | No award | | |

*Goalkeeper of the Year award was presented between 1994–95 and 2002–03 as the Jock Watt Trophy. From 2023–24 onwards, the winner listed is the named goalkeeper in the association's Team of the Season.
