= Dingwall Thistle F.C. =

Association football club in Highland, Scotland

- Full name: Dingwall Thistle Football Club
- Dissolved: 2012
- Ground: Jubilee Park; Dingwall
- League: North Caledonian Football League
Home colours

Dingwall Thistle Football Club was a amateur football team from Dingwall in the Highlands of Scotland. They competed in the North Caledonian Football League before becoming a welfare club in the local Ross-shire League. They play their home matches at Jubilee Park and their home colours are all red.

In 2012, the club announced its withdrawal from the North Caledonian Football League, and as a result ceased operations. A new youth football club was born in its place.
