= Sutherland United F.C. =

Association football club in Scotland

Sutherland United
- Full name: Sutherland United Football Club
- Founded: 2013
- Dissolved: 2015; 10 years ago
- Ground: Meadows Park, Dornoch
- Capacity: 1,000
- Chairman: Billy Clark
- Manager: Craig Caunter
- League: North Caledonian Football League
- 2014–15: North Caledonian Football League, 6th
Home colours

Sutherland United Football Club were a Scottish football club from Dornoch. They previously competed in the North Caledonian Football League.

They played in maroon strips and their home matches were at Meadows Park. The club was formed in 2013 and they were elected to the North Caledonian League for the start of the 2013–14 season. The Dornoch-based club withdrew from the league prior to the start of the 2015–16 season after they had lost all ten matches of the previous season, finishing bottom of the six-team division with no points.
