= The Pickaquoy Centre =

Leisure centre in Kirkwall, Orkney, Scotland

- The Picky Centre, or The Picky
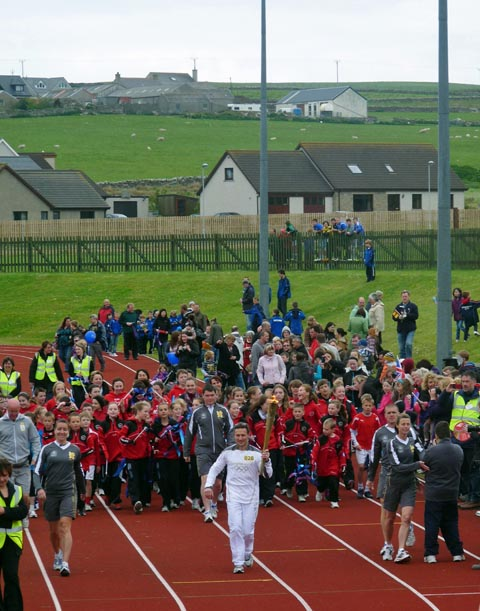
- The 2012 Summer Olympics torch relay visiting the Pickaquoy Centre

- Location within Orkney Islands
- Location: Kirkwall, Orkney
- Coordinates: 58°58′59″N 2°58′18″W
- Owner: Orkney Islands Council
- Operator: The Pickaquoy Centre
- Capacity: Concerts: 1,600; Conferences: 1,600; Basketball: 1,200

Construction
- Opened: 16 April 1999 (officially)
- Cost: £8.4 million

Tenants
- Orkney F.C. Orkney official football team

The Pickaquoy Centre, also known as the Picky Centre, or simply the Picky, is a multi-use leisure centre in Kirkwall, Orkney, Scotland. It is the largest leisure centre in the Northern Isles.

== Facilities ==
=== Sports ===
The Pickaquoy Centre has two swimming pools; a full-length Olympic size pool and a leisure pool. It has four gyms, an AstroTurf All Weather Pitch, and a 1,600-capacity sports arena with bleacher seating that can be condensed and used as a large indoor sports hall. The football pitches host Orkney F.C. of the North Caledonian Football League and also the Orkney official football team. It also has numerous meeting rooms, health spa, gym, indoor and outdoor children's play areas, a café and bar. Outside, there is an All Weather Pitch, used for football and hockey, several grass pitches used for football and rugby and an athletics track. The centre also has a campsite within its grounds. The leisure facility also has three squash courts indoors.

=== Other facilities ===
The Pickaquoy Centre is home to the New Phoenix Cinema, which seats 247 people, as well as a children's play park, and an indoor soft play area known as Jungle World. The Picky Cafe and Arena Bar is situated in the middle of the Pickaquoy Centre. The leisure complex also houses several public meeting rooms throughout the building. The Orkney Campsite is sited on the grounds of the Pickaquoy Centre.

== History ==
The Pickaquoy Centre opened for public use in late 1998, but was only officially opened on 16 April 1999, by HRH The Princess Royal. In 2012, construction began on an extension for the centre, adding the two swimming pools, the three squash courts, and another gym. This was officially opened again by HRH The Princess Royal in 2013.
