= St Duthus F.C. =

Association football club in Scotland

St Duthus
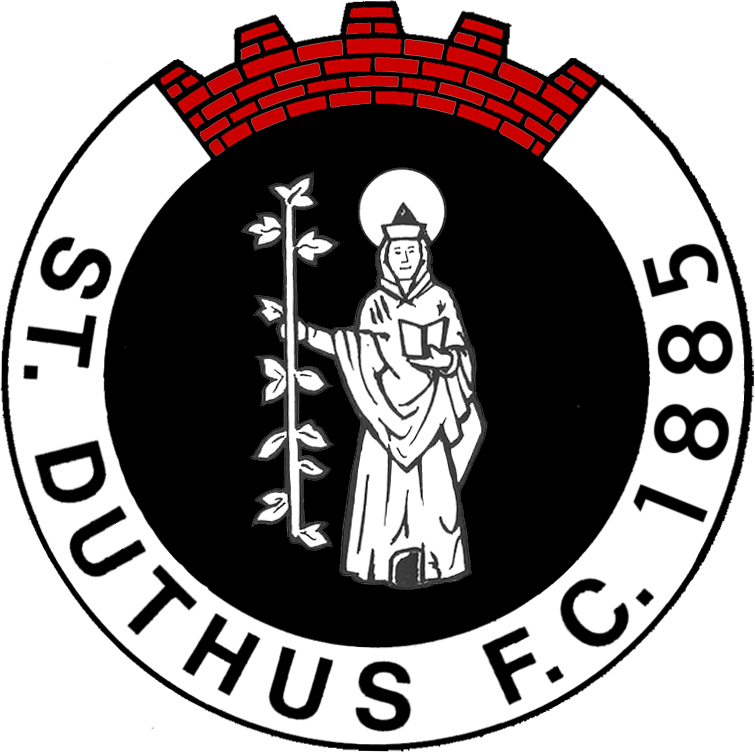
- Nicknames: "The Saints, The Tain Saints"
- Founded: 1885
- Ground: Grant Park, Tain
- Capacity: 1000
- Coordinates: 57°49′1″N 4°3′24″W
- Chairman: Niall Harkiss
- Manager: Arron Christie & Robert Ross
- League: North Caledonian League
- 2025–26: North Caledonian League, 11th of 12
Home colours	Away colours

St. Duthus Football Club (also referred to as Tain St. Duthus Football Club) is a senior Scottish football club playing in the North Caledonian Football League based at Grant Park (by the Links) in the town of Tain in the Scottish Highlands.

== Origins ==
Like many sports clubs in the Royal Burgh of Tain, several early incarnations of football teams adopted the name of Saint Duthac, the patron saint of Tain. Prior to the formalization of St. Duthus FC as an association football club, various combinations began playing informal association or rugby football matches using the St. Duthus name from the 1870s onwards.

== History ==
=== Pre-War ===
Officially formed in 1885 as an offshoot of St Duthus Cricket Club, St. Duthus Football Club began their existence under the association code by playing friendly matches against neighbouring towns and villages as founder members of the Ross-shire branch of the Scottish Junior Football Association. The "Saints" played in red and white vertical stripes throughout their formative years playing at the Links Playing Fields.

In 1895, St. Duthus played competitively for the first time in both the Pattisons' Challenge Cup and the Ross-shire Junior Cup. It was not until 1919–20 that they would compete for league honours, when they became the winners of the Ross-shire Junior League at the first time of asking following the association's restart at the end of the First World War.

In 1924–25, St. Duthus won the North of Scotland Junior Cup – at the time the highest accolade for teams playing the junior association code in the Highlands.

Following the death of long time club president The Count de Serra Largo, the club fell into abeyance in 1932 before returning in 1934 with a newly formed committee, now playing in team colours of horizontal black and white hoops.

In November 1938, the club prepared an application to join the Highland Football League ahead of the 1939–40 season, but problems arranging an enclosed ground halted their plans before the club once again fell into inactivity during the Second World War.

=== After the War ===
Back in their traditional colours of red and white, St. Duthus resumed competition in 1947, combining their own pre-war committee with war-time outfit Eastern Rose F.C., who had played for one season in the Ross-shire Junior League in 1946. From 1947 onwards, St. Duthus FC competed as a member of the Ross-shire Junior League until the league was reformed in the late 1950s as the Ross-shire Welfare League. The club won its first Ross-shire Welfare League title in 1955.

Under the management of Christopher Grant the team enjoyed their most successful year in the Ross-shire Welfare League in 1963, winning all four association cup trophies, and narrowly missing out on the league championship after a rules infringement led to a reversed result.

By the end of the 1960s, the team had moved to amateur status competing as a member of the Dingwall & District Amateur League, which would later become known as the Ross-shire Amateur League. They retained their membership until the late 1990s.

=== North Caledonian League (1971–2005) ===
The club eventually took the step up to senior status and gained membership of the North Caledonian Football League (then known as the North of Scotland 2nd XI League) in 1971, at which time they became known as Tain St. Duthus F.C., adopting the name of their home town.

The club enjoyed their most successful spell under the management of Edwin Skinner, assisted by Sandy Adam, between 1977 and 1986, winning six cup competitions during his tenure. They achieved their peak success during the 1978–79 season, when they won the Ness Cup and North Caledonian Cup double, and finished second in the league, just two points behind eventual winners Wick Academy.

Over the next 15 years, the club went through a number of managerial changes, with former player Alan Duff, ex Ross County and Wigan Athletic striker Tommy Ross and player/manager Mark Ford among those to lead the club.

Tain St. Duthus continued to compete as members of the league until the club's withdrawal from the association before the start of the 2005–06 season due to financial problems.

The team were briefly succeeded as Tain's representatives in the league by Ross-shire Welfare League team Tain Thistle, who competed in seasons 2008–09 and 2009–10 before they withdrew from the league.

=== North Caledonian League (2016–present) ===
On 22 March 2016, a new committee was formed and the club was re-admitted to the North Caledonian Football League on 18 May 2016. Coinciding with the club's revival, the committee elected to revert to the club's original name of St. Duthus FC.

Upon their reformation, brothers Stuart and Andrew Ross, whose father Tommy Ross had previously managed the club, were appointed as co-managers.

In their first season following their revival, the club reached the Jock Mackay Cup Final, narrowly losing to Orkney F.C. in a penalty shoot-out. They made amends the following season when they won their first silverware since their revival, defeating Golspie Sutherland F.C. at King George V Park to win the North Caledonian Cup on 10 March 2018.

St. Duthus were awarded the Scottish Football Association Quality Mark Standard award on 9 November 2017. The award was renewed in March 2021.

The club later secured the Football Times Cup on 18 January 2020, defeating Golspie Sutherland F.C. at Dudgeon Park in Brora.

On 27 September 2021, Stuart and Andrew Ross resigned as co-managers of the club, with coaches Alan Geegan and Justin Rogers taking temporary charge with immediate effect.

A fortnight later, Geegan was appointed as manager on a permanent basis, and in the same season he led the club to their seventh North Caledonian Cup win, beating Halkirk United 1–0 at Dudgeon Park, Brora on 2 April 2022.

After first launching its youth programme in 2018, the club enhanced its age levels in 2025 and now has teams operating at both under-16 and under-18 age levels competing in the Highland League youth initiative.

== Ground ==
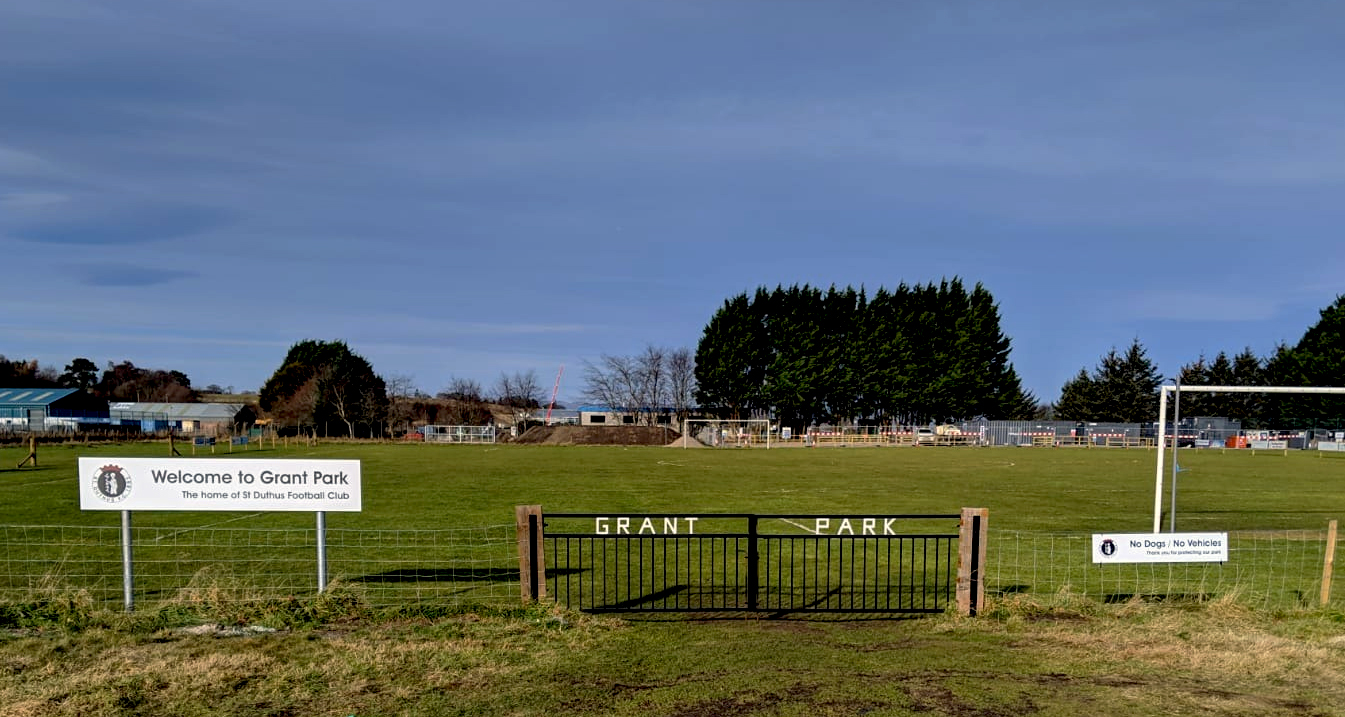
Grant Park football pitch – home of St. Duthus Football Club

St Duthus played at Tain's public Links Playing Fields from their formation in 1885 until the late 1940s – by which time it had become clear that damage done to the park during the Second World War had taken its toll on the surface. The club then moved to Coronation Park – a piece of land handed over to the club by the Tain town council in 1951. They remained there until 1965, after the club took the decision to sell the ground to Morrison Construction for a four-figure sum. For decades thereafter, St. Duthus remained at the Links.

In 1988, St. Duthus leased a new ground adjacent to the Links from the Ross & Cromarty Council for a period of 21 years and developed for use by St. Duthus. It was later named Grant Park, after former manager and committee member Christopher Grant. The club played its first official game on the new ground in 1998, welcoming then Highland Football League champions Huntly F.C. for a friendly match to mark its official opening.

Upon their return to the North Caledonian League in the 2016–17 season, the Saints initially played at the Links Playing Fields before returning to Grant Park in January 2019 following the renewal of their lease on the ground for a further 25 years.

== Honours ==
=== Senior ===
St Duthus have won the following senior honours under the auspices of the North Caledonian FA.

North Caledonian Cup / North of Scotland Junior Cup:

- 1924–25, 1978–79, 1983–84, 1986–87, 1989–90, 2017–18, 2021–22

Football Times Cup:

- 1980–81, 1981–82, 2019–20

Morris Newton Cup:

- 1990–91, 1991–92

Chic Allan Cup:

- 1985–86

Ness Cup:

- 1978–79, 1980–81

MacNicol Trophy (Fair Play award):

- 1975–76, 1988–89

=== Pre-war ===
St Duthus have won the following honours as a Ross-shire Junior FA club.

Pattisons' Challenge Cup

- 1895–96, 1901–02, 1919–20, 1924–25, 1925–26

Summerhall 2nd XI Cup

- 1919–20
