= Claggan Park =

Football ground in Fort William, Scotland

Coordinates: 56°49′19″N 5°04′54″W

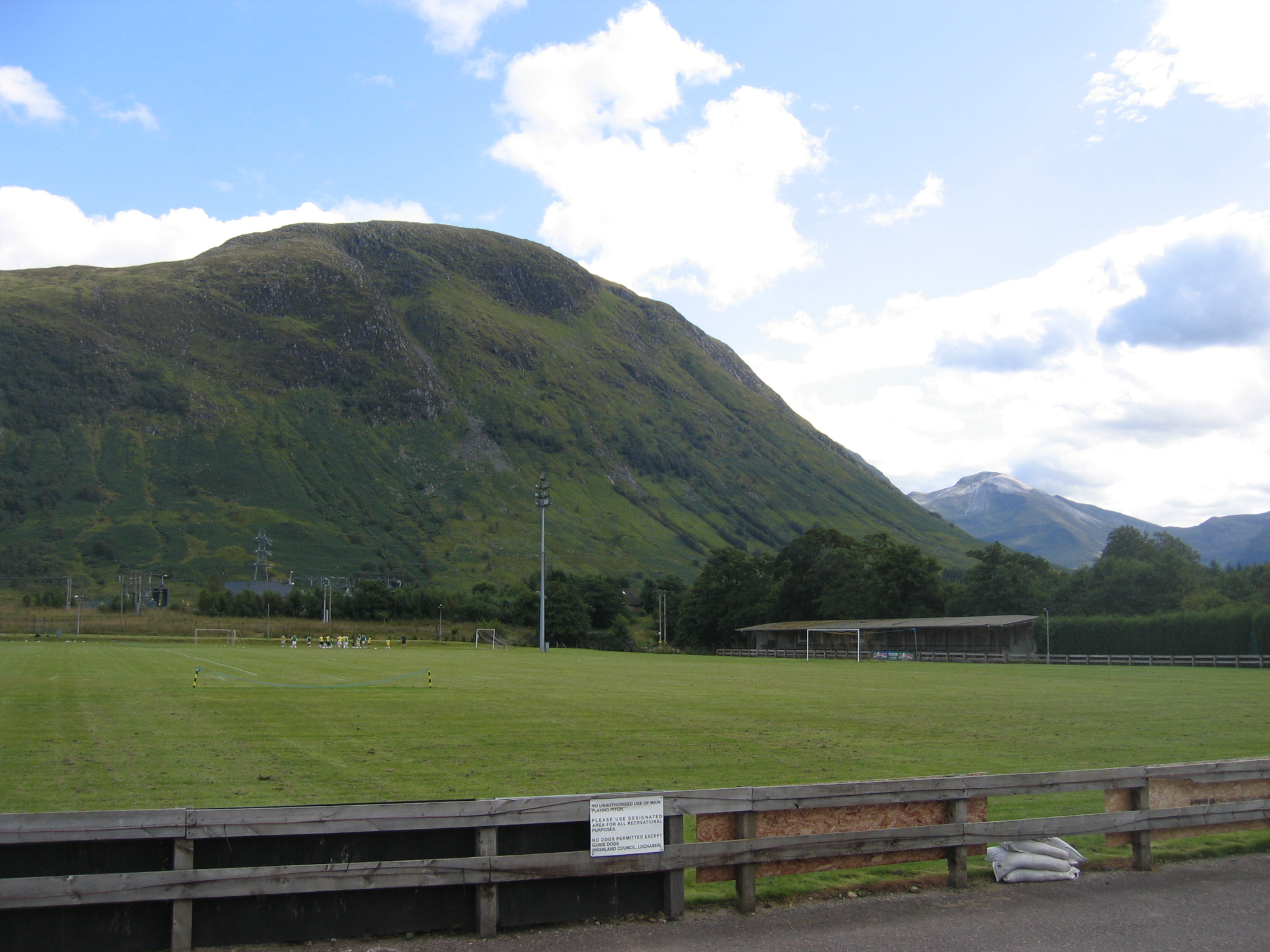
- Claggan Park nestles in the foothills of Ben Nevis.

- Location within Lochaber
- Location: Achintee Road, Fort William, Highland, Scotland
- Owner: Fort William F.C.
- Capacity: 1,800 (400 seated)
- Record attendance: 1,500 v Stirling Albion; 4 January 1986
- Field size: 102 x 80 yards

Tenant
- Fort William F.C.

Claggan Park is a football ground in Fort William in the West Highlands of Scotland, which is the home ground of North Caledonian League side Fort William. It is located on Achintee Road on the outskirts of the town and has a capacity of 1,800 with 400 seated. The ground is often considered the most picturesque in Great Britain due to its proximity to the foothills of Ben Nevis, the highest point in the United Kingdom.

== History ==
Fort William F.C. was one of the youngest members of the Highland Football League, joining in 1985, just over a decade after the club was founded. The club's first ever Highland League match at Claggan Park was against Clachnacuddin of Inverness and resulted in the club's first league goal in a 1–0 win. The record attendance at ground came a few months later in early January 1986 when 1,500 spectators watched the club take on Stirling Albion in the second round of the Scottish Cup. The match ended in a 0–0 draw but Fort William were thrashed 6–0 in the replay at Annfield Stadium in Stirling a week later.

Since 1971, Claggan Park has been the start and finish of the annual Ben Nevis Race.

== Structure and facilities ==
The ground has two stands that are able to seat 100 spectators while the whole ground can officially accommodate up to 1,800 with standees. However, with the old 400 seater stand being condemned and fenced off, the real capacity is lower.

== Transport ==
The nearest railway station to Claggan Park is Fort William railway station, which is about a 20-minute walk of a mile (1600 m) from the ground. The station is located on the West Highland Line between Glasgow Queen Street railway station and Mallaig railway station. Trains from Glasgow Queen Street terminate at Fort William before reversing out of the station and continuing on to Mallaig.
