= Bunillidh Thistle F.C. =

Association football club in Scotland

Bunillidh Thistle
- Full name: Bunillidh Thistle Football Club
- Nickname: The Jags
- Ground: Couper Park, Helmsdale
- Capacity: 500
- Coordinates: 58°6′54″N 3°39′21″W
- Manager: Andrew Banks
- League: North Caledonian League
- 2024–25: North Caledonian League, 12th of 12
Home colours	Away colours

Bunillidh Thistle Football Club is a senior Scottish football club playing in the North Caledonian Football League based at Couper Park in the village of Helmsdale in the Scottish Highlands.

== History ==
Bunillidh Thistle joined the North Caledonian League in the early 1970s, where they competed until their withdrawal at the end of the 2008–09 season. They enjoyed their most successful period in the mid-1980s, winning the league championship on two occasions, first in 1982–83 and again in 1988–89.

In 2017, the club were reformed and readmitted to the North Caledonian League ahead of the 2017–18 season.

== Honours ==
- North Caledonian League
  - Champions: 1982–83, 1988–89
- North Caledonian Cup
  - Winners: 1971–72, 1981–82
- Football Times Cup
  - Winners: 1986–87, 2001–02
- Chic Allan Cup
  - Winners: 1976–77, 1982–83, 1986–87
- MacNicol Trophy
  - Winners: 1972–73
- Ness Cup
  - Winners: 1973–74
