= Bonar Bridge F.C. =

Association football club in Scotland

Bonar Bridge
- Full name: Bonar Bridge Football Club
- Founded: 1968; (reformed 2019)
- Dissolved: 2010
- Stadium: Migdale Playing Fields, Bonar Bridge
- Capacity: 500
- Coordinates: 57.8929891°N 4.3386035°W
- Manager: Richard Brittain
- League: North Caledonian League
- 2025–26: North Caledonian League, 10th of 12
Home colours	Away colours

Bonar Bridge Football Club is a Scottish football club based in the town of Bonar Bridge in the Scottish Highlands. They play in the North Caledonian League.

Formed in 1968, they were regular members of the North Caledonian League for over thirty-five years before they dropped out in 2010 and fell into an extended period of abeyance.

The club was revived in 2019 with the intention of returning to the league. Their application was ratified at the League's AGM in July 2019.

== Honours ==
- North Caledonian Cup
  - Winners: 1977–78, 1993–94
- Morris Newton / SWL Cup
  - Winners: 1993–94
