= Orkney F.C. =

Association football club in Scotland

Orkney
- Full name: Orkney Football Club
- Founded: 2012; 14 years ago
- Ground: Kirkwall Grammar School, Kirkwall, Orkney
- Capacity: 500
- Coordinates: 58°58′49″N 2°56′56″W
- Chairman: Edgar Balfour
- Manager: Charlie Alway
- League: North Caledonian League
- 2025–26: North Caledonian League, 12th of 12
Home colours	Away colours

Orkney Football Club is a senior association football club from the Orkney Islands, Scotland. The club was founded in 2012 and competes in the North Caledonian Football League.

As of 2025, it is the only club outside the Scottish mainland that competes within the Scottish football pyramid. As a result Orkney hold the title as the most northerly senior football team in the British Isles.

== History ==
In 2012, the Orkney Amateur Football Association (OAFA) embarked on a strategy of seeking further games against teams from the Highlands & Islands. That year, the Orkney Football Club were formed for entry in the North Caledonian Football Association's cup competitions. The club's formation had been driven by a desire for several decades for Orkney football players to be given more opportunities to compete at a higher level with the aim of improving the standard of Orkney's most popular sport.

Orkney FC (by then being an entirely separate organisation from OAFA), gained full membership of the North Caledonian FA ahead of the 2014–15 season, becoming the first non-mainland club to play in the North Caledonian League itself. An impressive first season saw them finishing runners-up, while also securing the Ness Cup. In 2017–18, the club won the league and cup double.

In 2022, the club, despite not being SFA licensed, became eligible to compete in the Scottish Cup should they win the league, as the North Caledonian League was officially inaugurated into the Scottish football league system as Tier 6 and a feeder to the Highland League.

== Honours ==
Orkney have won the following honours as members of the North Caledonian FA:

North Caledonian League (1):

- 2017–18

Football Times Cup (1):

- 2017–18

Jock Mackay Cup (2):

- 2016–17, 2019–20

Ness Cup (2):

- 2014–15, 2015–16

== Ground ==
Orkney have played at various grounds on the Island, including The Pickaquoy Centre, Kirkwall Grammar School and Dounby.

During season 2020, they moved briefly to The Rockworks in Holm.

Since 2021, they have settled on a fixed home of Kirkwall Grammar School, with plans to upgrade the facilities there.

For the start of the 2025–26 season, Orkney returned to The Rockworks whilst upgrades to the grass pitch at Kirkwall Grammar School were ongoing.

For certain fixtures against further afield opposition, such as Fort William, Orkney are forced to play at a neutral venue on the mainland, due to travel, time and financial constraints, with the two sides usually meeting at a ground along the A9, at Invergordon, Golspie or Helmsdale.
