= Thurso F.C. =

Association football club in Scotland

Thurso FC
- Full name: Thurso Football Club
- Nickname: The Vikings
- Founded: 1998
- Ground: Sir George's Park, Thurso
- Capacity: 1,000
- Coordinates: 58°35′32″N 3°30′57″W
- Manager: Ross Sutherland
- League: North Caledonian League
- 2025–26: North Caledonian League, 4th of 12
Home colours	Away colours

Thurso Football Club are a senior football club from Thurso in Caithness, Scotland. They play in the North Caledonian Football League and are based at Sir George's Park aka The Dammies.

Thurso are the most northerly senior football club on the British mainland, as well as most northerly mainland team in the Scottish football league system. Only fellow North Caledonian League side, Orkney, are further north.

== History ==
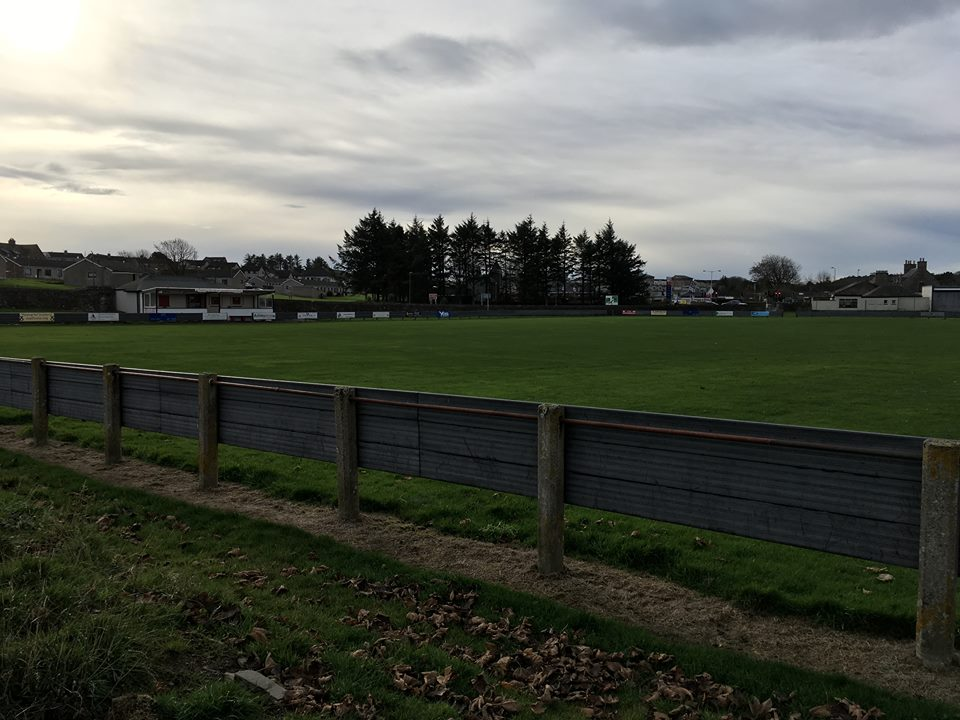
The club's home ground, Sir George's Park

The current club was formed in 1998. The club are nicknamed "the Vikings".

The club have won a number of honours (16) in their short history, including the North Caledonian League in 1999–00, 2002–03, 2009–10 and 2012–13 and 12 cups.

== Honours ==
North Caledonian Football League

- Champions: 1999–00, 2002–03, 2009–10, 2012–13

North Caledonian Cup

- Winners: 2001–02, 2003–04, 2010–11

Football Times Cup

- Winners: 2002–03, 2015–16, 2021–22

Chic Allan Cup

- Winners: 2004–05

Jock Mackay Cup

- Winners: 2010–11

Morris Newton / SWL Cup

- Winners: 2002–03, 2003–04, 2006–07, 2010–11, 2013–14
