= Alness United F.C. =

Association football club in Scotland

Alness United
- Full name: Alness United Football Club
- Ground: Dalmore Park, Alness
- Coordinates: 57°41′35″N 4°15′6″W
- Manager: Robert MacCormack
- League: North Caledonian League
- 2025–26: North Caledonian League, 2nd of 12
Home colours	Away colours

Alness United Football Club are a Scottish football club based in Alness, Highland. They currently compete in the North Caledonian Football League and play in black and white striped shirts with black shorts. The club has won the North Caledonian League on four occasions.

Alness play their home games at Dalmore Park, previously on a grass pitch but in 2022 they moved to a new artificial turf pitch with floodlights adjacent to Alness Academy.

They were given the Scottish Football Association's prestigious Quality Mark Development Award in July 2011.

United took a year out in 2019–20 but returned to the North Caledonian League the following season, winning the one-off Division Two as the league split for the 2020–21 season to reduce fixtures due to the COVID-19 pandemic.

== Honours ==
- North Caledonian League
  - Champions: 1972–73, 1973–74, 2000–01, 2004–05
- North Caledonian League - Division Two
  - Champions: 2020–21
- North Caledonian Cup
  - Winners: 1973–74, 1999–00, 2013–14
- Football Times Cup
  - Winners: 2000–01, 2018–19
- Jock Mackay Cup
  - Winners: 2026–27
- Chic Allan Cup
  - Winners: 1980–81, 2002–03, 2003–04
- MacNicol Trophy
  - Winners: 1980–81
- Ness Cup
  - Winners: 1977–78, 2020–21
- Morris Newton / SWL Cup
  - Winners: 1979–80, 1999–00, 2004–05
