= Halkirk United F.C. =

Association football club in Scotland

Halkirk United
- Full name: Halkirk United Football Club
- Nickname: The Anglers
- Founded: 1993
- Ground: Morrison Park, Halkirk
- Capacity: 1,000
- Coordinates: 58°31′10″N 3°29′39″W
- Chairman: William Campbell
- Manager: Ewan McElroy
- League: North Caledonian League
- 2025–26: North Caledonian League, 9th of 12
Home colours	Away colours

Halkirk United Football Club are a senior football team from Halkirk, Caithness in Scotland, who compete in the North Caledonian Football League.

== Club history ==
Halkirk United joined the North Caledonian League ahead of the 1993–94 season and in their first season they were crowned league champions.

It would take the club seventeen years until their next league success in 2010–11. They then enjoyed a period of dominance during the 2010s which saw them capture the title on four occasions.

Over the years, the club have developed a prominent rivalry with Caithness neighbours Thurso F.C., who joined the North Caledonian League in 1998.

== Ground ==
The club originally played at the town's Recreation Park, where their home remained until the opening of a new ground. With the help of funding from retired pharmaceutical executive Andrew Sinclair and the Halkirk District Benefit Fund, the club's new home "Morrison Park" was officially unveiled on 31 July 2013. The new playing field was announced as the first of several improvements to be made in a bid to meet the club's aim of joining the Highland Football League.

== Honours ==
- North Caledonian League
  - Champions: 1993–94, 2010–11, 2011–12, 2013–14, 2015–16
- North Caledonian Cup
  - Winners: 2005–06*, 2008–09*, 2011–12
- Football Times Cup
  - Winners: 2008–09, 2025–26
- Port Services Cup
  - Winners: 2005–06, 2008–09
- SWL Cup
  - Winners: 2011–12, 2015–16

* Also contested as Jock Mackay Memorial Cup
