= Inverness =

City in the Highlands of Scotland

Coordinates: 57.4778°N 4.2247°W

Inverness: Scottish Gaelic: Inbhir Nis; Scots: Innerness
- City and administrative centre
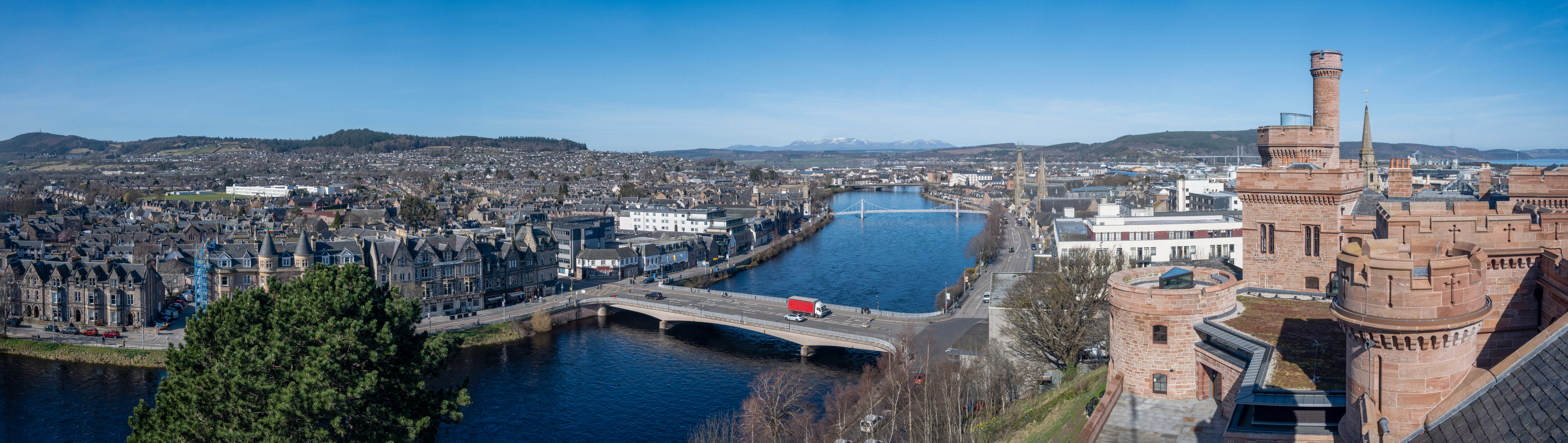
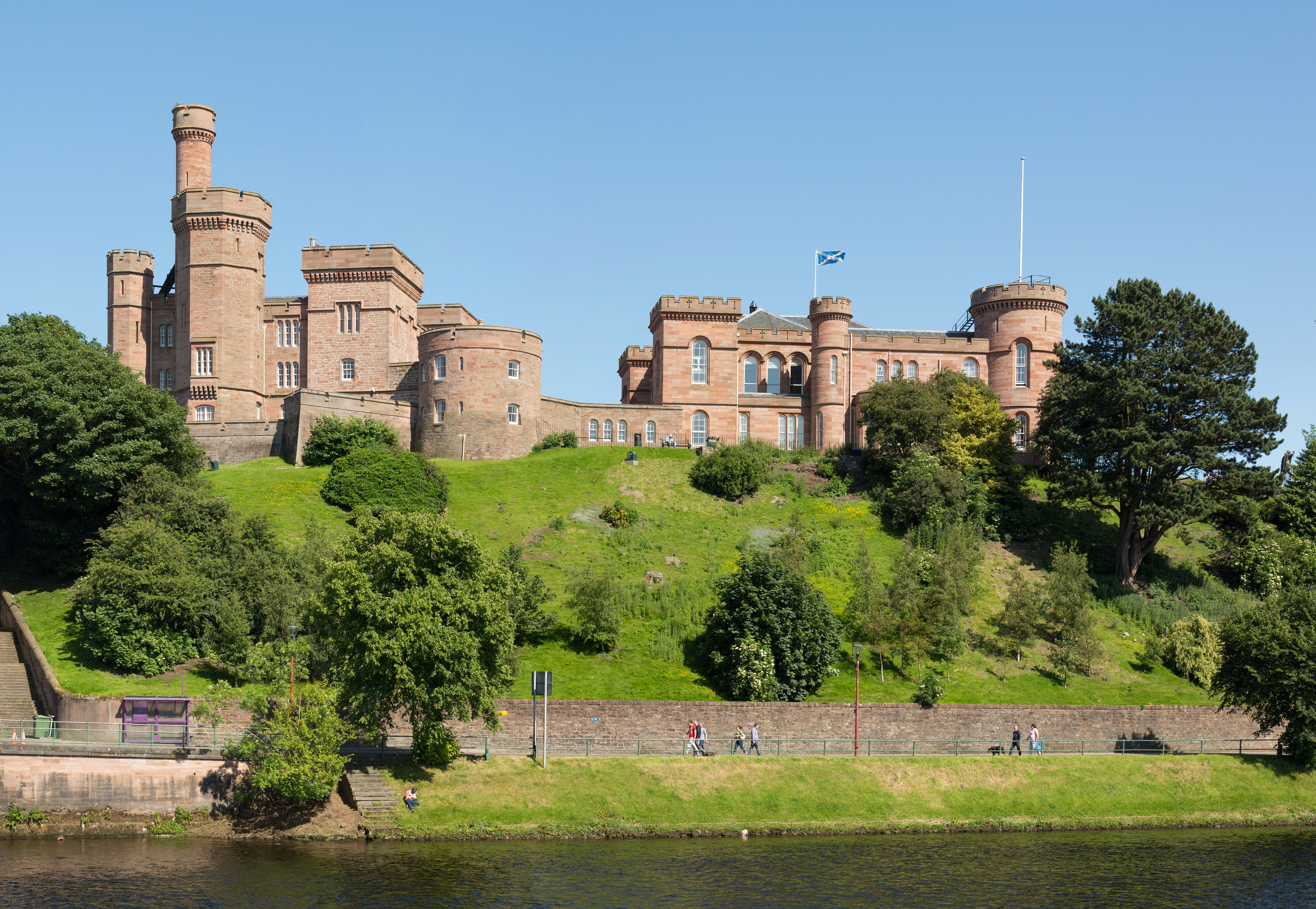
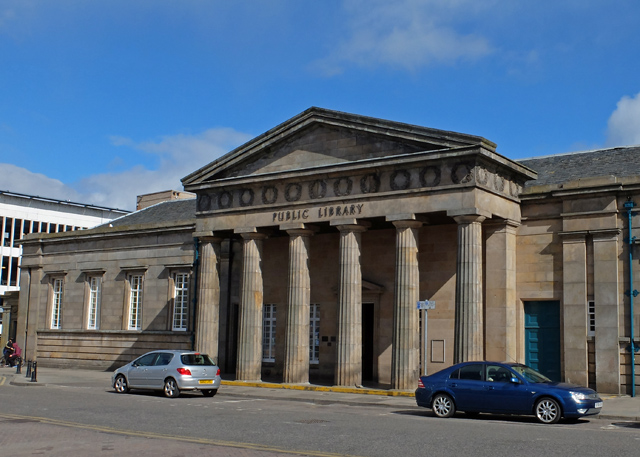
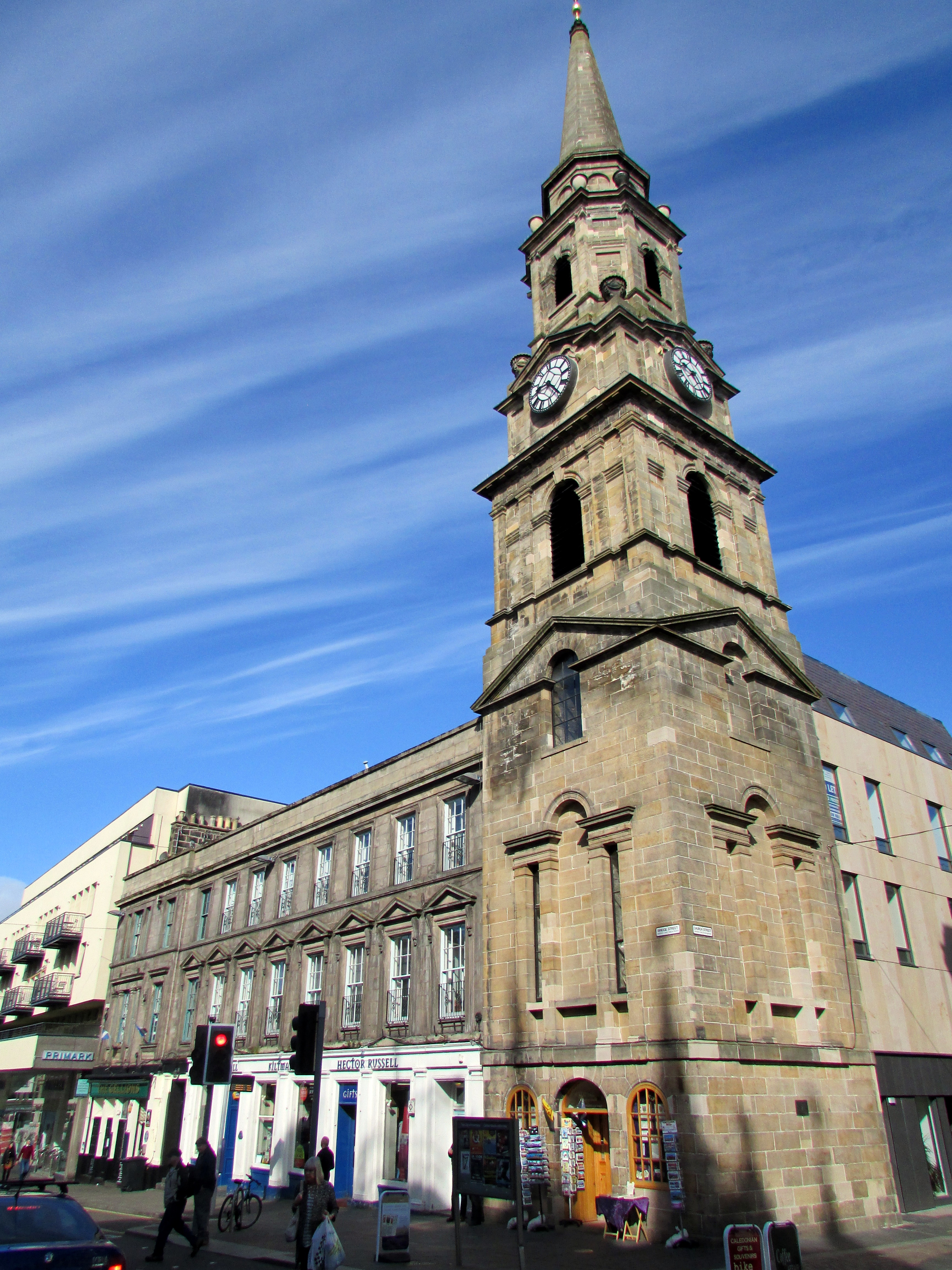
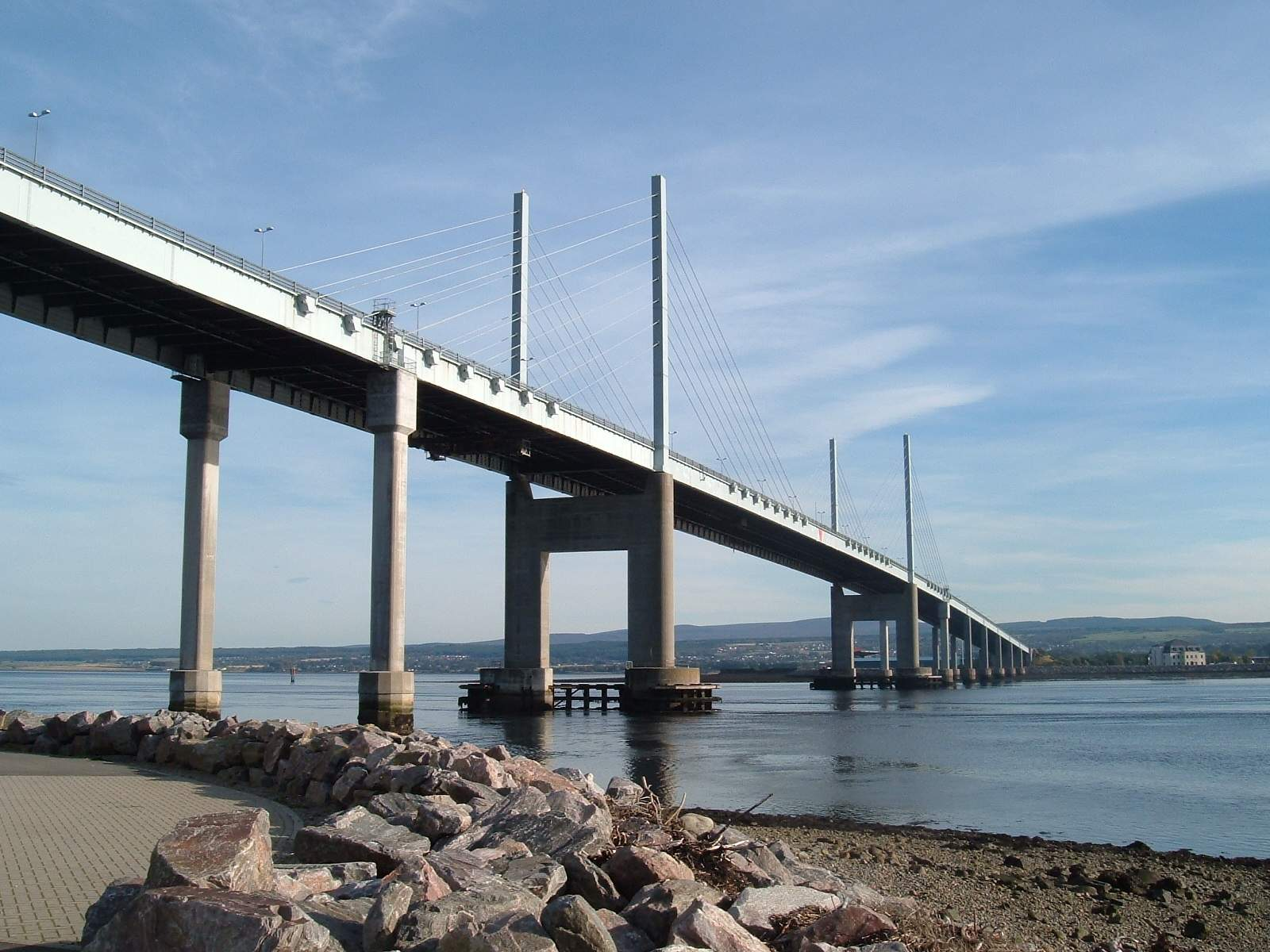
- Inverness skyline and the River Ness Inverness Castle Public Library Inverness Town Steeple Kessock Bridge

- Location within the Highland council area
- Area: 24.3 km^{2} (9.4 sq mi)
- Population: 48,248 (2022)
  - Density: 1,986/km^{2} (5,140/sq mi)
- Demonym: Invernessian/Invernesian/Niseach
- Language: English, Scots, Gaelic
- Council area: Highland
- Lieutenancy area: Inverness-shire
- Country: Scotland
- Sovereign state: United Kingdom
- Post town: INVERNESS
- Postcode district: IV1–3
- Dialling code: 01463
- Police: Scotland
- Fire: Scottish
- Ambulance: Scottish
- UK Parliament: Inverness, Skye and West Ross-shire
- Scottish Parliament: Inverness and Nairn

Inverness (Note: /ˌɪnvərˈnɛs/; Scots: Innerness; from the Scottish Gaelic: Inbhir Nis [iɲɪɾʲˈniʃ], meaning "Mouth of the River Ness") is a city in the Scottish Highlands in the north of Scotland. Long regarded as the de facto capital of the Scottish Highlands, it is the administrative centre for The Highland Council region whose headquarters are located close to the city centre. A regional hub for healthcare, education and research, business and economic services, public administration, culture, music and entertainment, media, communications, transport and leisure, the city provides a range of services for the wider Highlands and Islands Region, a large hinterland encompassing a population of around half a million people and an area of some 39,911 km² or 51% of Scotland's total landmass.

Inverness previously served as the county town of the county of Inverness-shire before becoming the headquarters of the larger Highland Council region. With human settlement dating back to circa 7000 BC and permanent human settlement established by 5,800 BC the city has remained a strategically important location since antiquity and has periodically experienced armed conflict. Today, Inverness lies near two important battle sites: the 11th-century battle of Blàr nam Fèinne against Norway which took place on the Aird and the 18th century Battle of Culloden which took place on Culloden Moor, the last pitched battle fought in the United Kingdom. Lying within the Great Glen (An Gleann Mòr) at its northern extremity, the city's River Ness flows from Loch Ness via Loch Dochfour before it empties into the Moray Firth where the historic Beauly Firth and Inverness Firth met at the Kessock Crossing. The northernmost city in the United Kingdom, it was granted city status in the year 2000 as a Millennium City, having become more prominent in its economic and population growth throughout the preceding decade.

Following the early settlement of Inverness, the city became an established self-governing settlement by the 6th century with the first Royal Charter being granted by Daibhidh I mac Mhaoil Chaluim (King David I) around the year of 1160. Inverness and the surrounding country are closely linked to various influential clans, including the locally powerful Clan Mackintosh, Clan Fraser and Clan MacKenzie. Local clans unique to the city include Donnchaidh (Robertson) of Inshes, MacSheòrais (Cuthbert) of Castlehill, MacLean of Dochgarroch, Fraser of Culduthel and Leys, Baillie of Dunain, Shaw of Essich, and Forbes of Culloden.

Between 2001 and 2022, the population of the old urban core of Inverness west of the A9 (historically Rathad Mòr an Rìgh or the King's Great Highway), grew from 40,969 to 48,248. The Greater Inverness area, including areas not previously connected to the rest of Inverness, including Culloden, Balloch, Resaurie, Smithton and Westhill had a population of 56,969 in 2012. Four years later, the population had grown by 6351 to 63,320, an increase of 10%. Inverness is one of Europe's fastest growing cities, with over a quarter of the Highland population living within the city or in its surrounding areas. Recent planning decisions by the Highland Council have approved the construction of housing developments near Inshes which will establish an area of continuous urban land with the potential to provide clarity and continuity for the city's population and growth in the years ahead.

Inverness is noted for its high quality of life and the happiness rankings of its population, frequently ranking high for its quality of life and levels of happiness among its residents. In 2008, Inverness was ranked fifth out of 189 British cities for its quality of life, the highest of any Scottish city. The city was ranked the happiest place to live in Scotland in 2014 and 2015, 5th in terms of quality of life in 2015 repeating its 2008 place as the highest quality of life in Scotland, the second happiest place in 2023 and in 2024, the happiest place to live in the entire United Kingdom.

== Prehistory and archaeology ==
Much of what is known about Inverness's prehistory comes from archaeological work that takes place before construction/development work as part of the planning process.

Between 2009 and 2010, archaeological work in advance of the creation of flood defences to the south of the city at Knocknagael Farm by GUARD Archaeology discovered an archaeological site that showed humans had been living in the Inverness area from at least 6500 BC, the Late Mesolithic period. That same site showed people living/working in the area from the mid-7th millennium BC into the Late Iron Age (1st millennium AD) with most activity taking place in the Early Neolithic (4th millennium BC). The archaeologists also found a piece of flint from Yorkshire that showed that people in Inverness may have been trading with Yorkshire during the Neolithic.

Between 1996 and 1997, CFA Archaeology (then part of the University of Edinburgh) undertook excavations of crop marks in the west of Inverness in advance of the construction of a retail and business park. A Bronze Age cemetery was discovered in 1996 and in 1997 the archaeologists found the remains of a Bronze Age settlement and an Iron Age settlement, with an ironsmith. It is one of the earliest examples of iron smithing in Scotland. The Iron Age settlement had Roman brooches from the AD 1st–2nd centuries, indicating trade with the Roman Empire. Similarly, the Bronze Age site showed signs of metal production: finds included ceramic piece-moulds designed for the casting of Late Bronze Age leaf-shaped swords. A 93 troy ounces (2.89 kilograms) silver chain dating to 500–800 CE was found just to the south of Torvean, during the excavation of the Caledonian Canal, in 1809.

== History ==
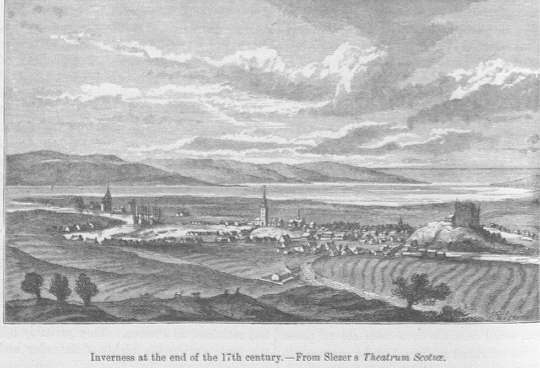
Inverness at the end of the 17th century

=== Picts ===
Inverness was one of the chief strongholds of the Picts. In AD 569, it was visited by St Columba with the intention of converting the Pictish king Brude, who is supposed to have resided in the vitrified fort on Craig Phadrig, on the western edge of the city. A church or a monk's cell is thought to have been established by early Celtic monks on St Michael's Mount, a mound close to the river, now the site of the Old High Church and graveyard.

=== Medieval ===
The first royal charter was granted by Dabíd mac Maíl Choluim (King David I) in the 12th century. The Gaelic king Mac Bethad Mac Findláich (MacBeth) whose 11th-century killing of King Duncan was immortalised in Shakespeare's largely fictionalised play Macbeth, held a castle within the city where he ruled as Mormaer of Moray and Ross.

Inverness Castle is said to have been built by Máel Coluim III (Malcolm III) of Scotland, after he had razed to the ground the castle in which Mac Bethad mac Findláich had, according to much later tradition, murdered Máel Coluim's father Donnchad (Duncan I), and which stood on a hill around 1 km to the north-east.

The strategic location of Inverness has led to many conflicts in the area. Reputedly there was a battle in the early 11th century between Malcolm III and Thorfinn the Mighty at Blar Nam Feinne, to the southwest of the city.

Inverness had four traditional fairs, including Legavrik or "Leth-Gheamhradh", meaning midwinter, and Faoilleach. William the Lion (d. 1214) granted Inverness four charters, by one of which it was created a royal burgh. Of the Dominican friary founded by Alexander III in 1233, only one pillar and a worn knight's effigy survive in a secluded graveyard near the city centre.

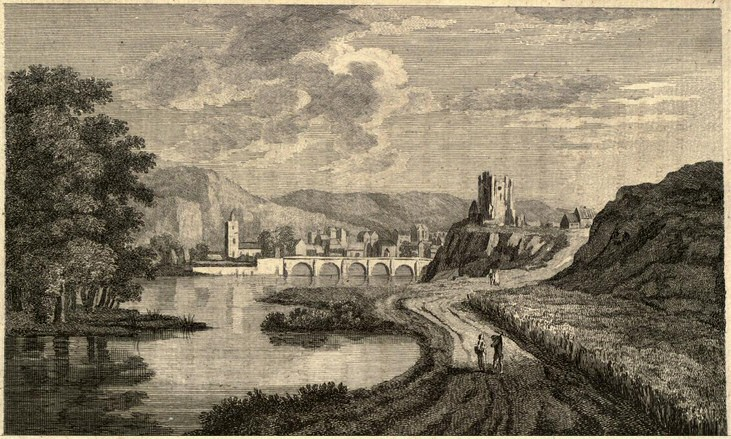
Engraving of Inverness from A Tour in Scotland by Thomas Pennant, 1771

Medieval Inverness suffered regular raids from the Hebrides, particularly by the MacDonald Lords of the Isles in the 15th century. In 1187, one Dòmhnall Bàn (Donald Ban) led islanders in a battle at Torvean against men from Inverness Castle led by the governor's son, Donnchadh Mac an Tòisich (Duncan Mackintosh). Both leaders were killed in the battle, and Dòmhnall Bàn is said to have been buried in a large cairn near the river, close to where the silver chain was found. Local tradition says that the citizens fought off the Clan Donald in 1340 at the Battle of Blairnacoi on Drumderfit Hill, north of Inverness across the Beauly Firth. In the late 14th-early 15 century, Inverness was a symbol of the Duke of Albany's power. On his way to the Battle of Harlaw in 1411, Donald of Islay took the town and burned the bridge over the River Ness. Sixteen years later, James I held a parliament in the castle to which the northern chieftains were summoned, of whom three were arrested for defying the king's command. Clan Munro defeated Clan Mackintosh in 1454 at the Battle of Clachnaharry just west of the city. Clan Donald and their allies stormed the castle during the Raid on Ross in 1491.

=== Post-medieval ===
In 1562, during the progress undertaken to suppress Huntly's insurrection, Mary, Queen of Scots, was denied admittance into Inverness Castle by the governor, who belonged to the earl's faction, and whom she afterwards caused to be hanged. The Clan Munro and Clan Fraser of Lovat took the castle for her. The house in which she lived meanwhile stood in Bridge Street until the 1970s, when it was demolished to make way for the second Bridge Street development.

Beyond the then northern limits of the town, Oliver Cromwell built a citadel capable of accommodating 1,000 men, but with the exception of a portion of the ramparts it was demolished at the Restoration. A clock tower today called Cromwell's Tower is located in the Citadel area of Inverness but was actually part of a former hemp cloth factory built c. 1765.

Inverness played a role in the Jacobite rising of 1689. In early May, it was besieged by a contingent of Jacobites led by MacDonell of Keppoch. The town was rescued by Viscount Dundee, the overall Jacobite commander, when he arrived with the main Jacobite army, although he required Inverness to profess loyalty to King James VII.

=== 18th century ===
In 1715, the Jacobites occupied the royal fortress as a barracks. In 1727, the government built the first Fort George here but, in 1746, it surrendered to the Jacobites and they blew it up. Culloden Moor lies nearby and was the site of the Battle of Culloden in 1746, which ended the Jacobite rising of 1745–46.

In 1783, the year that saw the end of the American Revolution and the beginning of the Highland Clearances in Inverness-shire, Coinneach MacChoinnich (1758–1837), a poet from Clan MacKenzie who was born at Castle Heather, then known as Castle Leather (Caisteal Leothair), composed the Gaelic poem The Lament of the North. In the poem, MacChionnich mocks the Highland gentry for becoming absentee landlords, evicting their tenants en masse in favour of sheep, and of "spending their wealth uselessly", in London. He accuses King George III both of tyranny and of steering the ship of state into shipwreck. MacChionnich also argues that truth is on the side of George Washington and the Continental Army and that the Scottish Gaels would do well to emigrate to the New World before the King and the landlords take every farthing they have left.

=== Industrial Revolution, the World Wars and end of the millennium ===
In 1855, the railways first came to Inverness with the Inverness and Nairn Railway, which ended up getting absorbed into the Inverness and Aberdeen Junction Railway by 1861. The Loch Gorm railway works was built soon after the line, in 1857, which built locomotives for the Highland Railway which formed in 1865, when the I&AJR and the I&PJR (Inverness and Perth Junction Railway) merged, connecting rural towns in the North and East, such as Wick, Thurso and Kyle of Lochalsh to the rest of the network across the United Kingdom. The Far North Line would become crucial come the start of World War One, as coal trains took priority to provide fuel to the Royal Navy's Home Fleet at Scapa Flow in the Orkney Islands. The Loch Gorm works had become redundant prior to WWI and was delegated to a maintenance facility, a duty which it provides to this day.

The Annual Reports of the Fishery Board for Scotland provide an insight into fishing in Inverness in the years before the First World War. The account for 1900 is significant: "Although a good number of crews belonging to the adjoining district land and dispose of their fish at this port, there are neither boats nor fishermen belonging to the place. The capture of small herrings and sprats in the Beauly Firth was followed after by more than thirty crews. On no occasion were the landings very heavy." Even when fishing from Inverness resumed in 1908, it appears to have been on a small scale. The report for 1910 describes how "herring and sprat fishing is prosecuted from this port during last two and the first month of the year"

Fishery Statistics

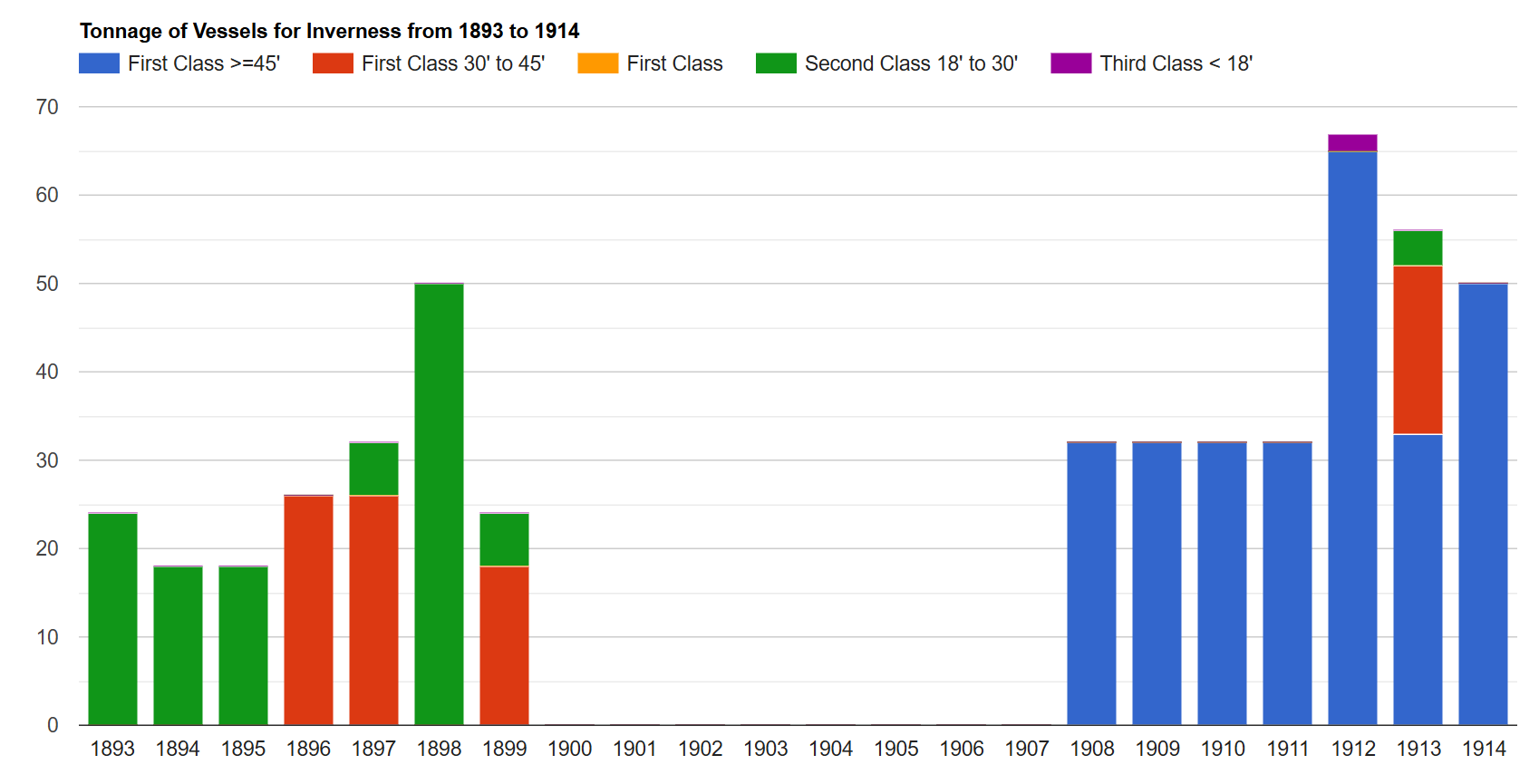
Tonnage of vessels

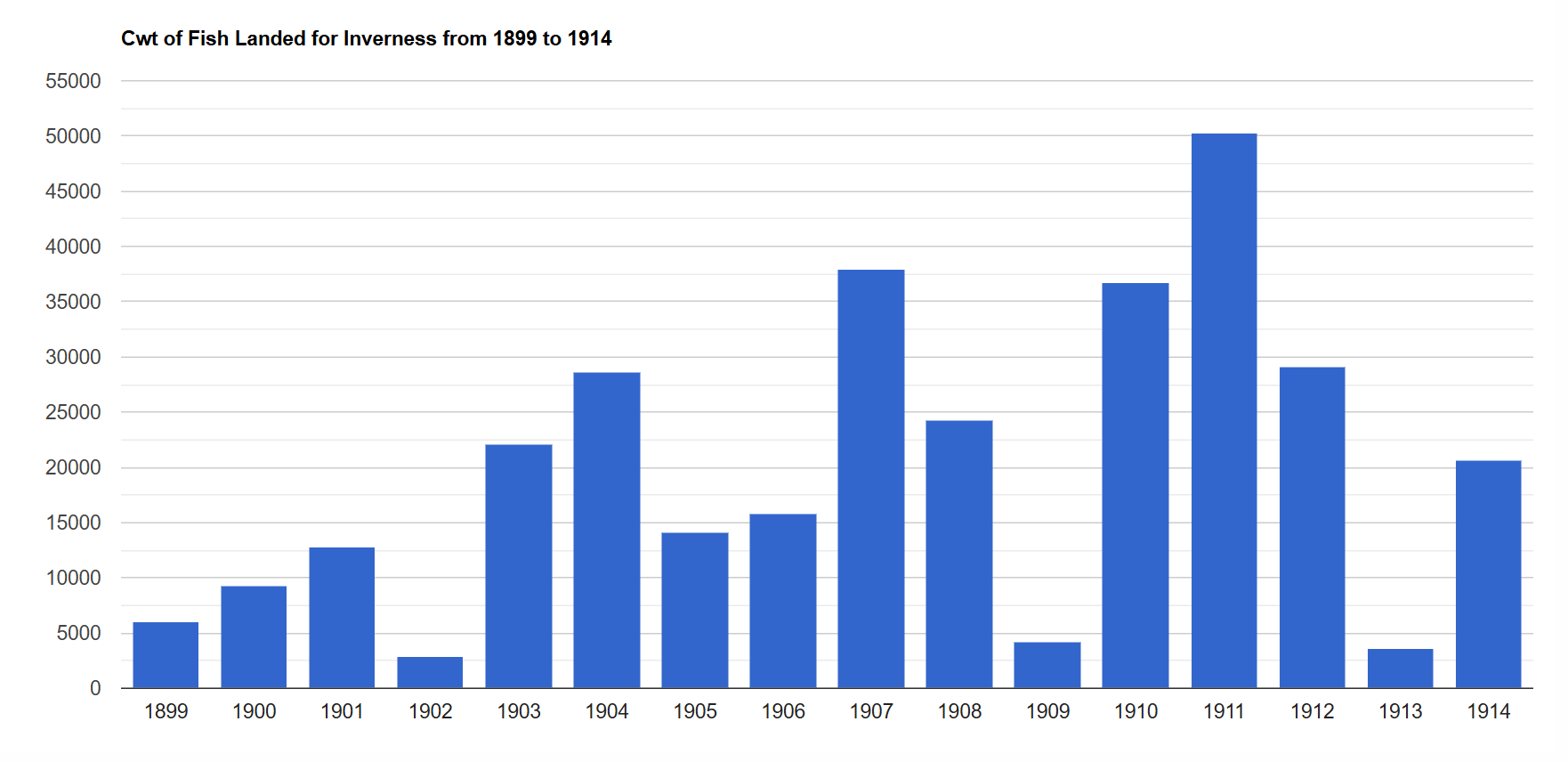
Cwt of fish landed

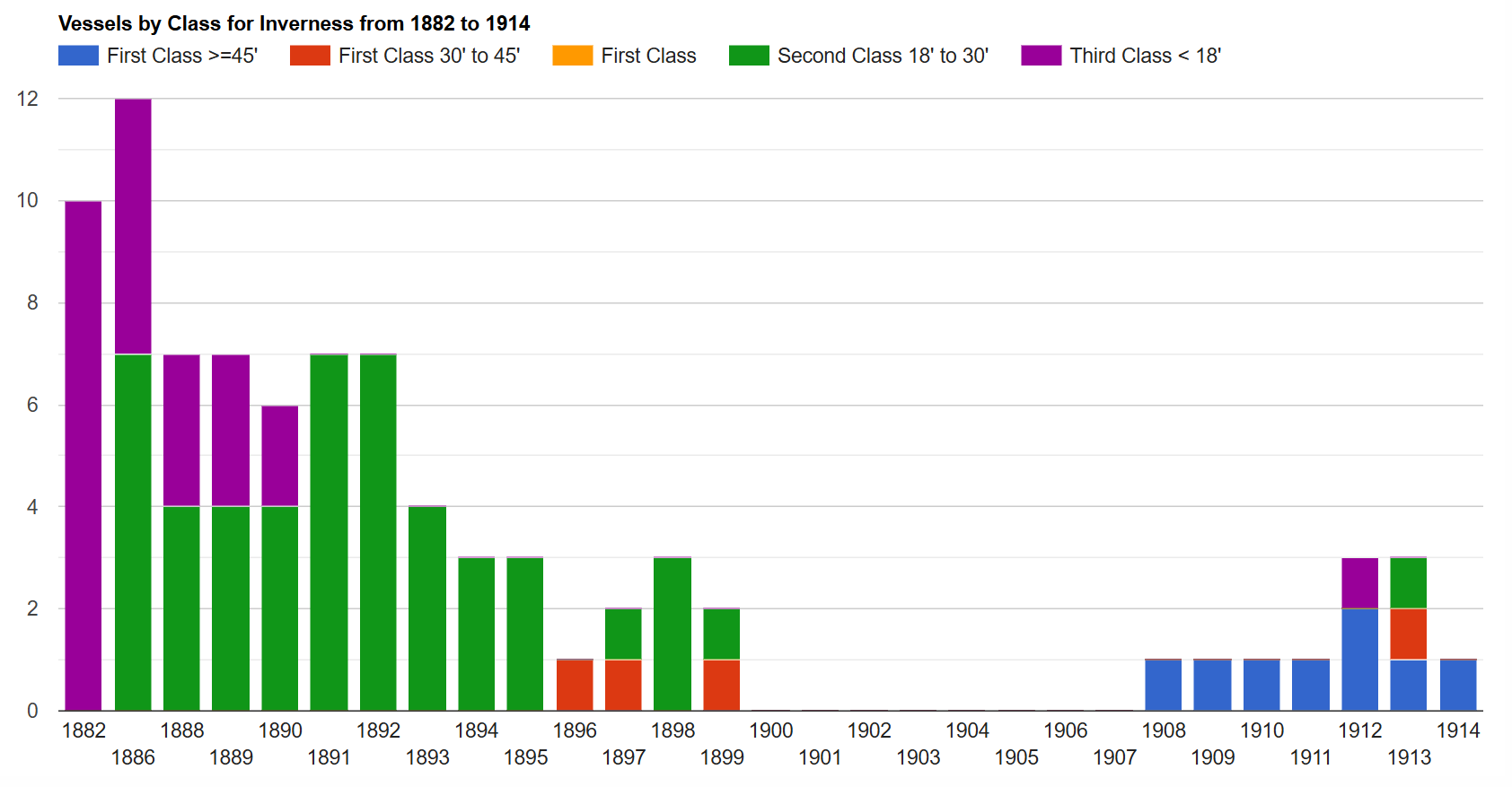
Vessels by class

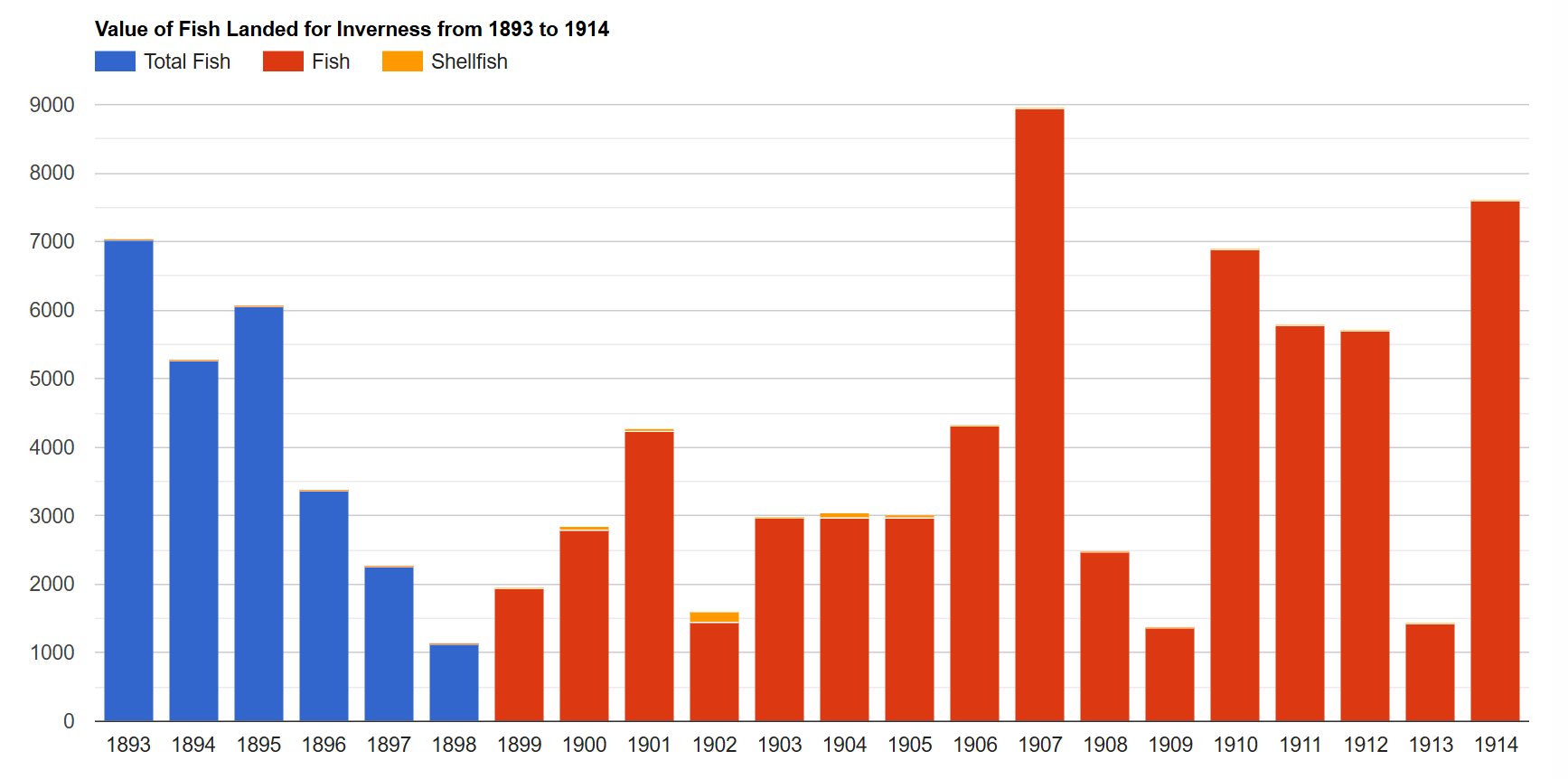
Value (£] of fish landed

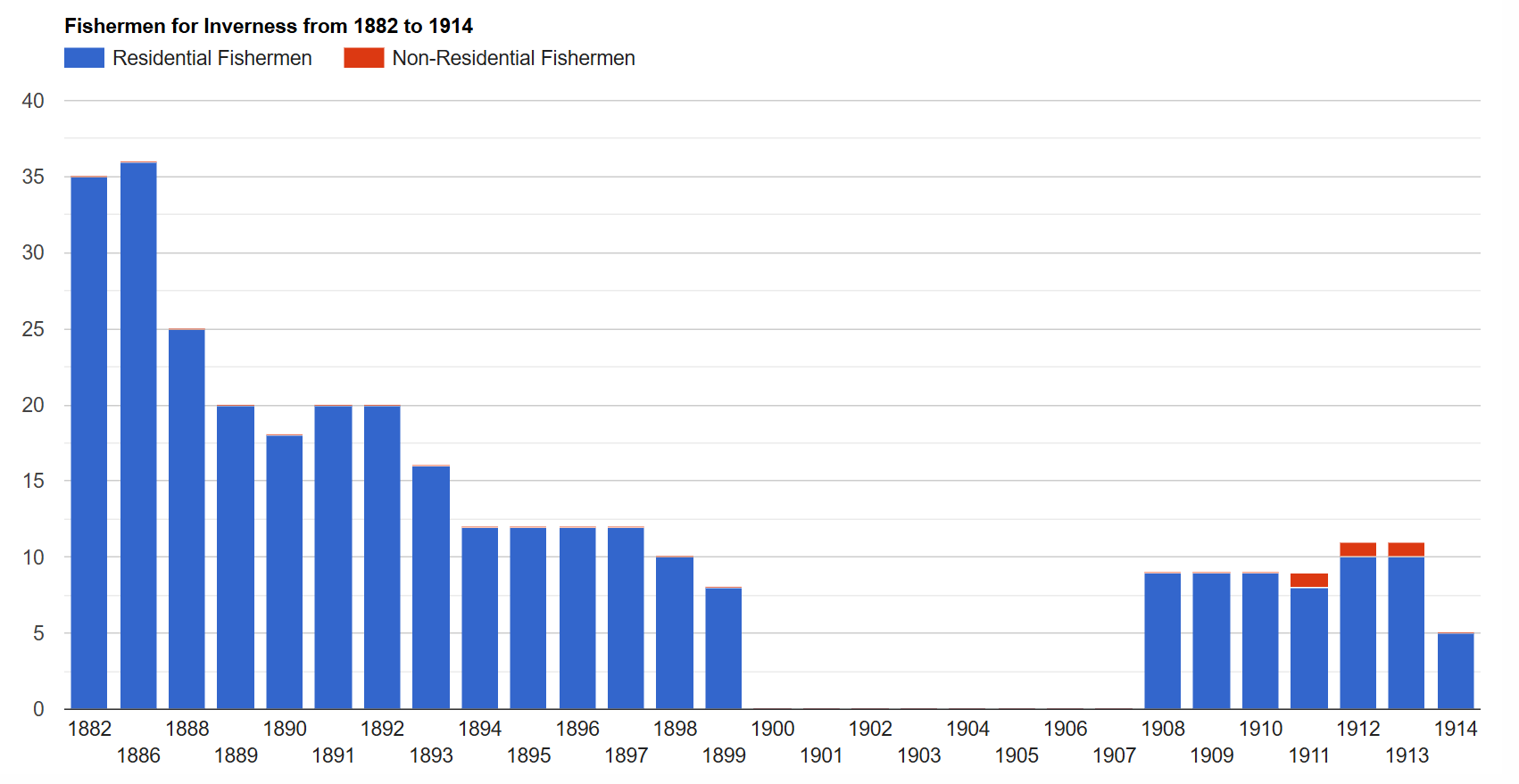
Fishermen

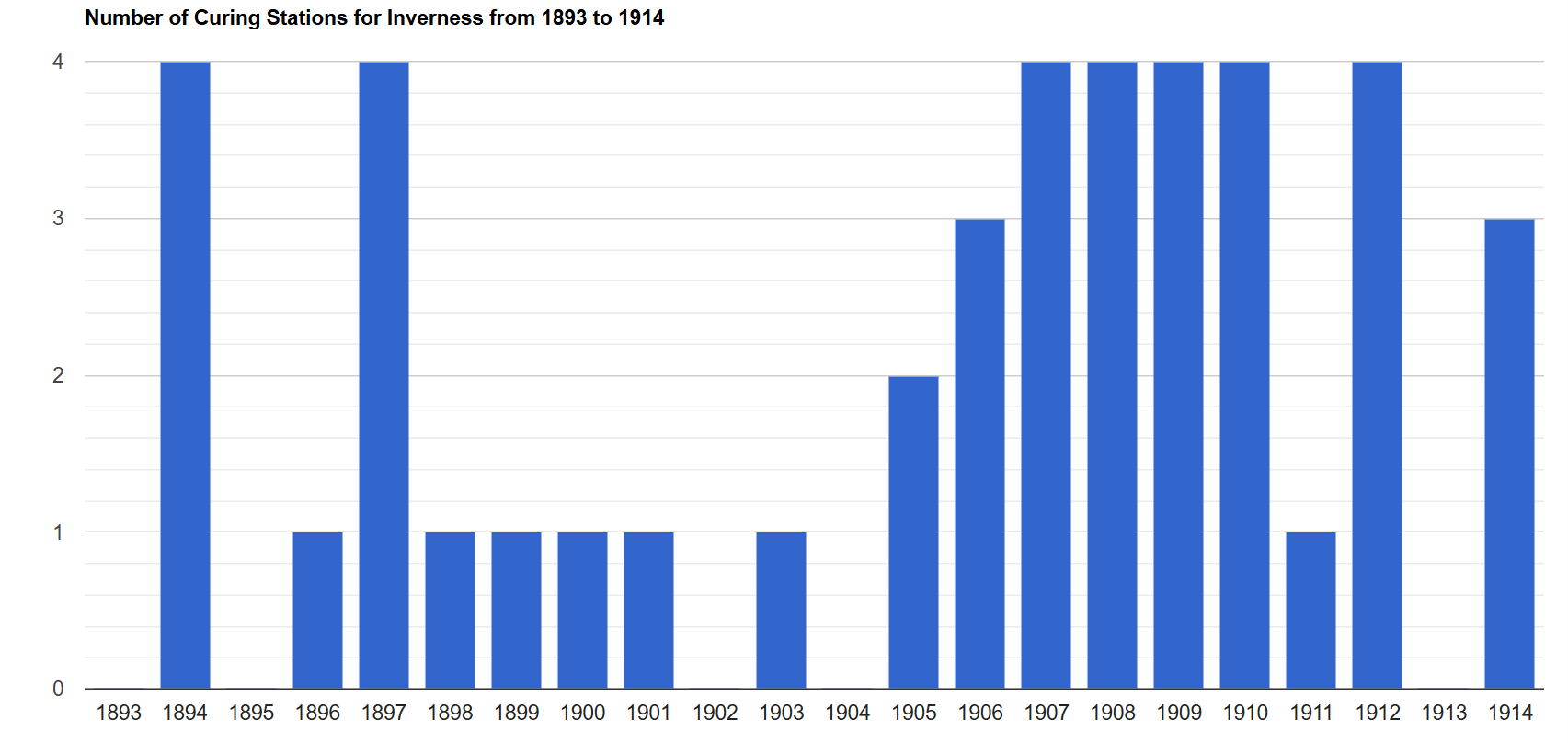
Number of curing stations

During World War One, the U.S. Navy opened a naval base US Naval Base 18 at the Muirtown Basin on the Caledonian Canal. It was a final stage in constructing anti-submarine mines for the North Sea Mine Barrage, a 230 mile long and 25 mile wide minefield between Orkney and Norway, with USNB 18 contributing at least 70,000 mines. This base was also connected to the rail network with large sidings temporarily laid over a field behind the nearby Merkinch Primary School. This yard was marshalled by a LB&SCR A1 class 'Terrier' No.38 "Millwall", loaned by the Admiralty, and sold on to the Glen Albyn distillery following the conflict's end. The canal was also used heavily by fishing vessels as a shortcut from East to West in order to dodge the Imperial German Navy U-boats patrolling the North Coast.

The Rose Street drill hall was completed in around 1908. On 7 September 1921, the first UK Cabinet meeting to be held outside London took place in the Inverness Town House, when David Lloyd George, on holiday in Gairloch, called an emergency meeting to discuss the situation in Ireland. The Inverness Formula composed at this meeting was the basis of the Anglo-Irish Treaty.

Prior to World War Two, air travel came to Inverness, in the form of the Longman Aerodrome in 1933, becoming the hub for Highland Airways, providing connections to Orkney and Wick, however this didn't last long as Highland Airways was absorbed into Scottish Airways in 1938, with the Aerodrome being requisitioned by the Royal Air Force after the declaration of war on Germany the following year, forming RAF Inverness. Following the war, the airport returned to civilian use, before shutting down in 1947 over safety concerns due to its size; it moved to the former RAF Dalcross, where it remains to day, with the former airfield quickly being swallowed up under an industrial estate.

Again, Inverness played its part in a global conflict as the Home Fleet returned to Scapa Flow, and coal trains took priority going North. In January 1943, the Luftwaffe charted the area, however they incorrectly identified the Air Force Base as a seaplane base, saving Inverness from any Luftwaffe air raids, becoming one of only a few towns in Scotland to survive the war undamaged. The closest Luftwaffe bombs fell was at the British Aluminium Works at Foyers, approximately 11 miles south-south-east along Loch Ness. This resulted in the death of 52 year old fitter Archibald MacDonald, and caused 69 year old furnaceman Murdo MacLeod to suffer a fatal heart attack, becoming the only civilian fatalities to enemy action within the Inverness area.

Following VE Day, Inverness's industry went into decline. The Caledonian Canal was long obsolete, and the danger to fishing vessels around the North Coast by enemy hands was no longer there. With the rise of road transport, the Beeching Cuts rolled back a lot of Inverness's railway infrastructure, with the roundhouse being demolished in 1962, and the Far North and the Kyle of Lochalsh only avoided closure by to fierce resistance by residents.

In September 1952, Inverness regained national attention in tragic circumstances as World Land Speed record holder, John Cobb, was killed in an attempt at the World Water Speed record on Loch Ness, after his craft Crusader, powered by a de Havilland Ghost jet engine, crashed and disintegrated while travelling at over 200 mph.

=== 21st century ===
Inverness has experienced rapid economic growth in the 21st century; between 1998 and 2008, the city and the rest of the central Highlands showed the largest growth of average economic productivity per person in Scotland and the second-greatest growth in the United Kingdom as a whole, with an increase of 86%. It was awarded the Nicholson Trophy (class 2 category) for the best town with between 20,000 and 50,000 inhabitants at Britain in Bloom contest in 1975. In 2014, a survey by a property website described Inverness as the happiest place in Scotland and the second happiest in the UK. It was again found to be the happiest place in Scotland by a study conducted in 2015.

Earl of Inverness was a royal title held by Andrew Mountbatten-Windsor from 1986. Following public and media pressure, he relinquished the title on 17 October 2025, along with several others.

== Demography ==
=== Toponymy ===
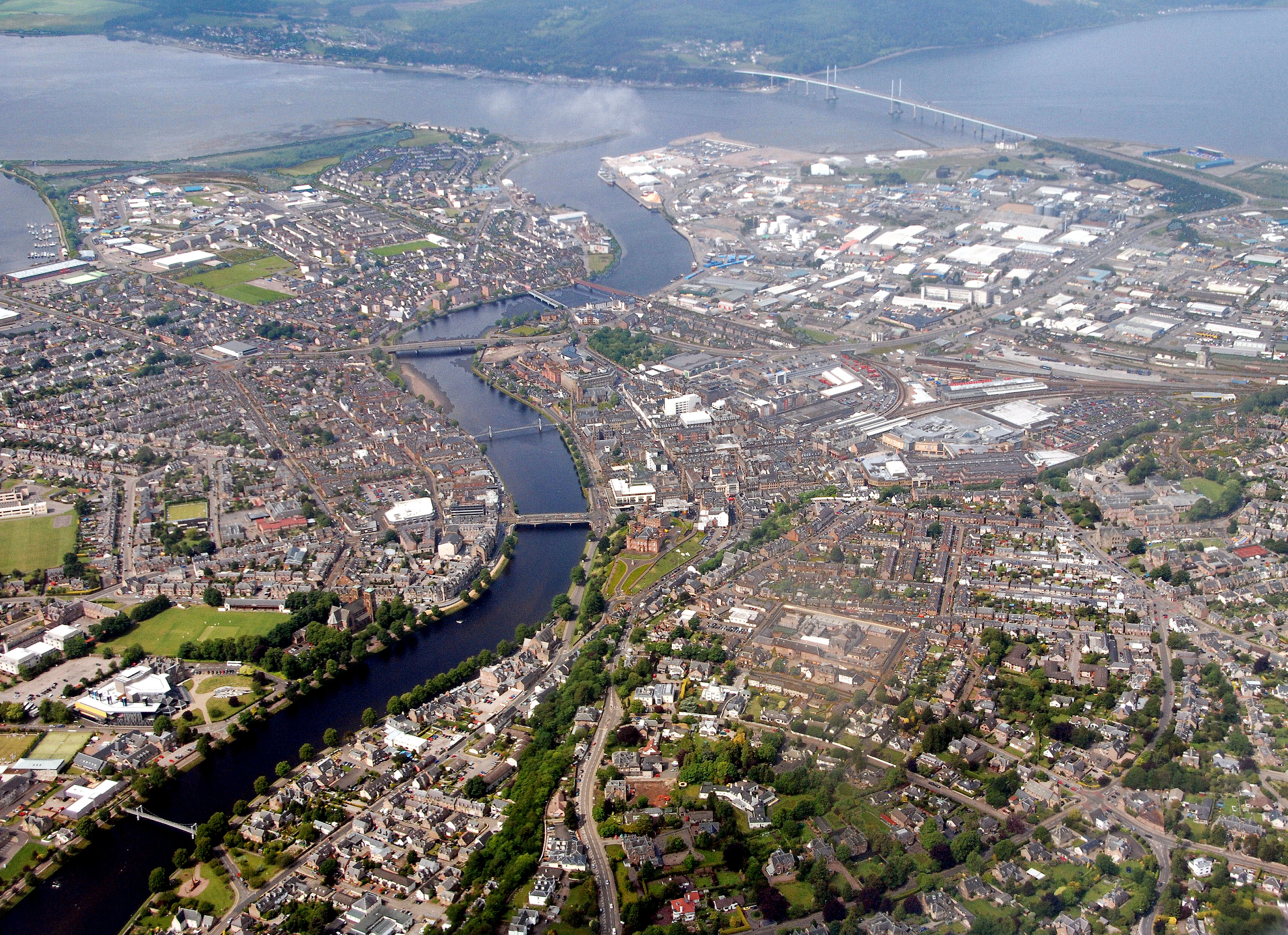
Inverness is often regarded as the Capital of the Highlands.

Inverness and its immediate hinterland have a large number of originally Gaelic place names, as the area was solidly Gaelic-speaking until the late 19th century.

Placename	Original Gaelic	English Translation
Abertarff	Obar Thairbh	Mouth of the Bull River
Aldourie	Allt Dobhraig	River of the Water
Allanfearn	An t-Àilean Feàrna	The Alder Meadow
Ardconnel	Àird a' Choin Ghil	High Place of the White Dog
Aultnaskiach	Allt nan Sgitheach	The Hawthorn River
Ballifeary	Baile na Faire	Town of the Watch
Balloan	Baile an Lòin	Town of the Meadow
Balloch	Baile an Locha	The Loch Town
Balmore (of Leys)	Baile Mòr (An Leigheis)	The Big Town
Balnafettack	Baile nam Feadag	Town of the Plovers
Balvonie	Baile a' Mhonaidh	Town on the Moor
Balvraid	Baile a' Bhràghaid	Town of the Brae
Beauly Firth	Poll an Ròid	Bay of the Rood (Cross)
Ben Wyvis	Beinn Uais	Mount Terror
Bogbain	Bog Bàn	The White Marsh
Bunchrew	Bun Chraoibh	Foot of the Tree
Carnarc	Càrn Airc	The Sea Stone
Castle Heather	Caisteal Leathoir	Castle on the Slope
Castlehill	Caisteal Still	Castle of the Spout/Waterfall
Charleston	Baile Theàrlaich	Tearlach's Town
Clachnaharry	Clach na h-Aithrigh	Stone of The Watch
Craggie	Cragaidh	Rocky Place
Craig Dunain	Creag Dùn Eun	Crag of the Bird Fort
Croftnacreich	Croit na Crioche	The Boundary Croft
The Crown	A' Chrùn	The Crown
Croy	A' Chrothaigh	The Hard Place
Culcabock	Cùil na Càbaig	Nook of the Cabock Cheese
Culduthel	Cuil Daothail	The Northern Nook
Culloden	Cùil Lodair	Nook of the Marsh
Dalcross	Dealgros	Prickle Point
Dalneigh	Dail an Eich	Meadow of the Horse
Dalmagarry	Dail Mac Gearraidh	MacGarry's Meadow
Dell	Dail MhicEachainn	MacEachen's Meadow
Diriebught	Tìr nam Bochd	Land of the Poor
Dochfour	Dabhach Phùir	Davoch of Pasture Land
Dochgarroch	Dabhach Garrach	Rough Davoch
Dores	Dubhras	Black Wood
Drumdevan	Druim Dìomhain	The Idle Ridge
Drummond	An Druimein	The Ridge
Drumossie	Druim Athaisidh	Ridge of the Great Meadow
Essich	Easaich	Place of the Stream
Inshes	Na h-Innseagan	The Meadows
Inverness	Inbhir Nis	Mouth of the River Ness
Kessock	Ceasaig	(Saint) Ceasaig
Kilmuir	Cille Mhoire	Mary's Church
Kilvean	Cill Bheathain	Church of St.Bain
Kinmylies	Ceann a' Mhìlidh	The Warrior's Head
Lairgmore	Luirg Mór	Big slope
Leachkin	Leacainn	Broad Hillside
Loch Ness	Loch Nis	Headlands Lake
Lochardil	Loch Àrdail	The Cardinal's Lake
Longman	Long Mìn / Long Mhìn	Field of the Ship / Ship Flat
Merkinch	Marc Innis	The Horse Meadow
Millburn	Allt a' Mhuilinn	Stream of the Mill
Muckovie	Mucamhaigh	The Pig Place
Raigmore	Rathaig Mhòir	Big Fort
Resaurie	Ruigh Samhraidh	Summer Slope
Scaniport	Sganaphort	Ferry by the Crack
Scorguie	Sgurr Gaoithe	The Windy Hill
Slackbuie	An Slag Buidhe	The Yellow Hollow
Smithton	Baile a' Ghobhainn	Town of the Smith
Tomatin	Tom Aitinn	Hill of the Juniper
Tomnahurich	Tom na h-Iubhraich	Hill of the Yew Trees
Torvean	Tòrr Bheathain	MacBean's Hill

Several springs which were traditionally thought to have healing qualities exist around Inverness. Fuaran Dearg, which translates as the "Red Spring", is a chalybeate spring located near Dochgarroch. Fuaran a' Chladaich ("The Spring on the Beach") near Bunchrew was once accessed by a causeway from the shore. Although submerged at high tide it continues to bubble and was traditionally known for treating cholera. Fuaran Allt an Ionnlaid ("Well of the Washing Burn") at Clachnaharry, where the Marquis of Montrose was allowed to drink while on his way from his capture in Sutherland to his execution in Edinburgh, was known for treating skin conditions. Also at Clachnaharry, Fuaran Priseag ("The Precious Well") was said to have been blessed by Saint Kessock and could treat weak and sore eyes, as well as expelling evil and shielding curses if a silver coin was offered. Tobar na h-Oige ("Well of the Young") is located near Culloden and was known for curing all ailments. Fuaran a' Chragan Bhreag ("Well of the Speckled Rock") is located near Craig Dundain and Fuaran na Capaich ("The Keppoch Well") is located near Culloden. Inverness is also home to the Munlochy Clootie Well.

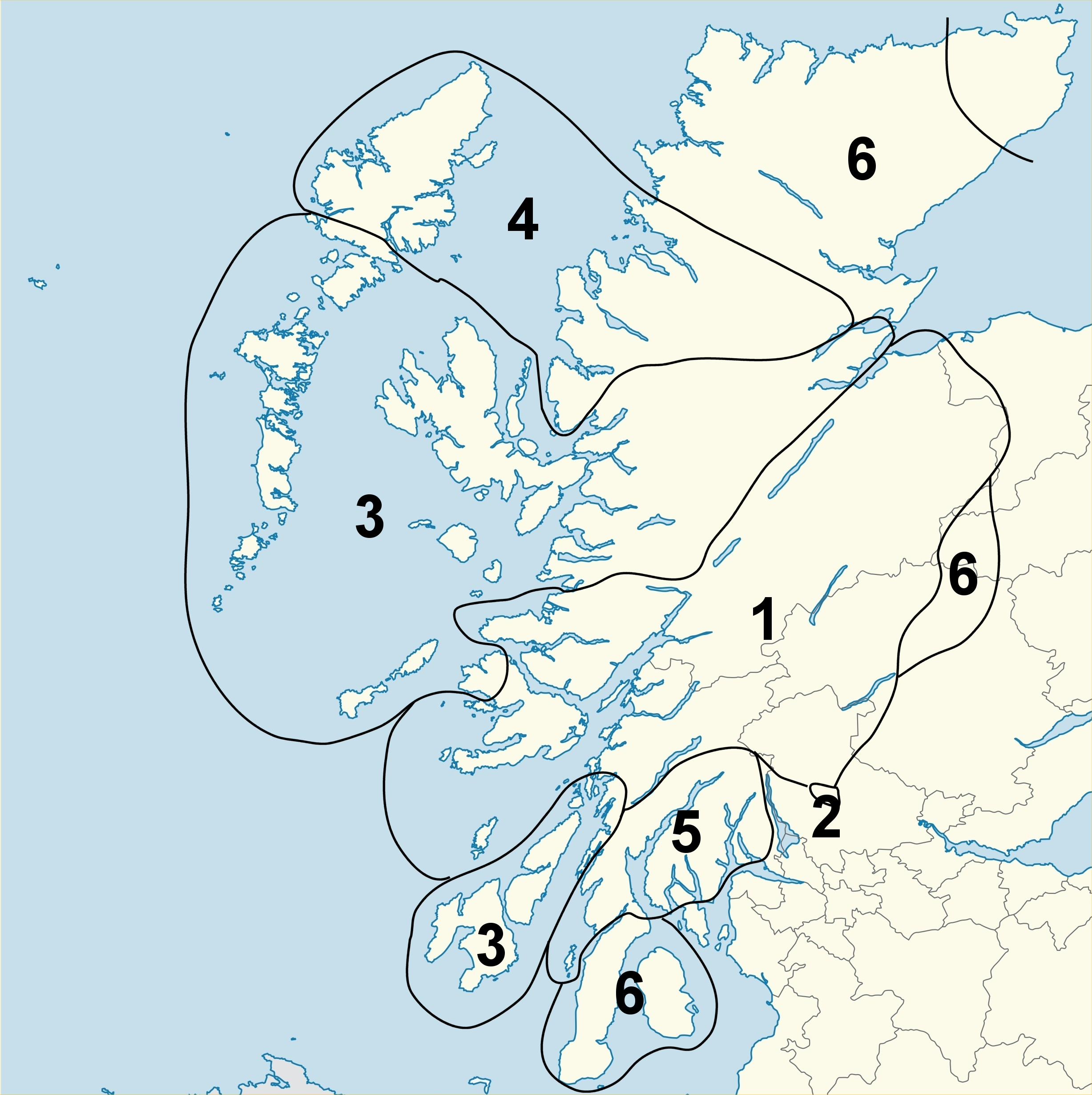
The use of preaspiration in different Scottish Gaelic dialects throughout the Highlands, from 1 (strong) to 6 (absent). Preaspiration was used in the dialect of Inverness Gaelic and is still evident in both the Gaelic and English spoken in Inverness today.

Although a Gaelic name itself, Craig Phadraig is alternatively known as Làrach an Taigh Mhóir, or "The Place of the Great House". Several Gaelic place names are now largely obsolete due to the feature being removed or forgotten. Drochaid an Easain Duibh ("Bridge by the Small Dark Waterfall"), referred to in the tale Aonghas Mòr Thom na h-Iubhraich agus na Sìthichean ("Great Angus of Tomnahurich and the Fairies") has not yet been located within Inverness and Slag nam Mèirleach (meaning "Robbers' Hollow"), adjacent to Dores Road in Holm is no longer in use. Until the late 19th century, four mussel beds existed on the delta mouth of the River Ness: Scalp Phàdraig Mhòir ("Scalp of Great Patrick"), Rònach ("Place of the Seals"), Cridhe an Uisge ("The Water Heart") and Scalp nan Caorach ("Scalp of the Sheep") – these mussel beds were all removed to allow better access for fishing boats and ships.

Allt Muineach (The Thicket River) now runs underground between Culcabock Roundabout and Millburn Roundabout, where as Allt an Ionnlaid (The Washing Burn) flows largely underground from Scorguie down to the Canal where it meets the healing well of Fuaran Allt an Ionnlaid. Other streams which retain their original Gaelic names include Allt na Banaraich (The Milkmaid's Stream), Allt na Caillich (The Old Lady's Stream), Allt an Easg (The Eel Stream) and Allt Shiamaidh (Jimmy's Burn) in Inshes, Allt Màsach (The Thick-set Stream) and Allt Meadhanach (The Middle Stream) in Easter Leys, Allt na Crìche (The Border Stream) in Culloden, Allt Bhoth a' Chlagain (The River of Little Bell Bothy) at Muckovie and Allt na h-Iomaire (Stream of the Land Ridge) at Balcruy/Stratton. An Loch Gorm (The Turquoise Loch), a small sea loch which was situated beside Morrisons supermarket, was filled in during the 19th century and lives on only in the name of Lochgorm Warehouse. Abban Street stems from the word àban, a word of local Gaelic dialect meaning a small channel of water.

Many prominent points around Inverness retain fully Gaelic names.

- Beinn Bhuidhe Bheag – "Little Yellow Hill"
- Beinn Uan – "Lamb Hill"
- Cnoc na Mòine – "The Peat Hill"
- Cnoc na Gaoithe – "The Hill of the Wind"
- Cnoc an t-Seòmair – "The Hill of the Room"
- Creag Liath – "Grey Crag"
- Creag nan Sidhean – "The Crag of the Fairies"
- Doire Mhòr – "Great Oakwood"
- Carn a' Bhodaich – "The Old Man's Cairn"
- Meall Mòr – "Great Hill"

In the colonial period, a Gaelic-speaking settlement named New Inverness was established in McIntosh County, Georgia, by settlers from in and around Inverness. The name was also given by expatriates to settlements in Quebec, Nova Scotia, Montana, Florida, Illinois, and California. The name Inverness is also given to a feature on Miranda, a moon of the planet Uranus, as well as a 2637 m tall mountain in British Columbia, Canada. Inverness is also known by its nicknames Inversnecky or The Sneck, with its inhabitants traditionally known as Clann Na Cloiche ("Children of the Stone" in Gaelic) owing to the importance of the Clach Na Cudainn stone in the city's history. This large flat stone is now located outside the town hall, by the historic Mercat Cross. The stone was originally at the river Ness, where the townswomen took their laundry. They would rest their tubs on the stone, thus it became known as the stone of the tubs - 'clach na cudainn'.

=== Population ===
Year	Greater Inverness	Inverness
2021	65,210	47,820
2018	64,350	47,380
2016	63,220	47,290
2012	59,910	46,870
2010	57,960	45,050
2008	56,660	44,220
2006	54,070	42,400
2004	52,530	40,880
2003	51,610	40,470
2001	46,944	40,949
1991	44,903	40,918
1981	43,246	40,011
1971		34,839
1961		29,774
1951		28,107
1881		17,365
1871		14,469
1861		12,509
1841		10,663
1831		14,324
1821		12,264
1811		10,750
1801		8,732
1791		7,930

The National Records of Scotland define Inverness as the urban area west of the A9. To produce a greater Inverness figure including the villages of Balloch, Culloden, Smithton, and Westhill, it is necessary to aggregate NRS figures for each locality.

== Geography ==
=== Location ===
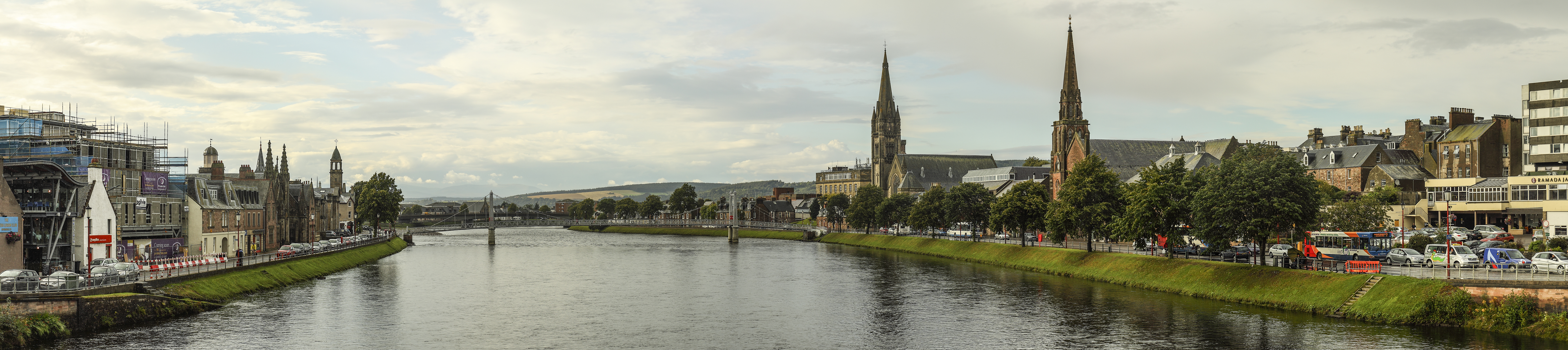
Panorama of Inverness looking downstream to the Greig St Bridge with Huntly Street (left), the River Ness and Bank Street (right)

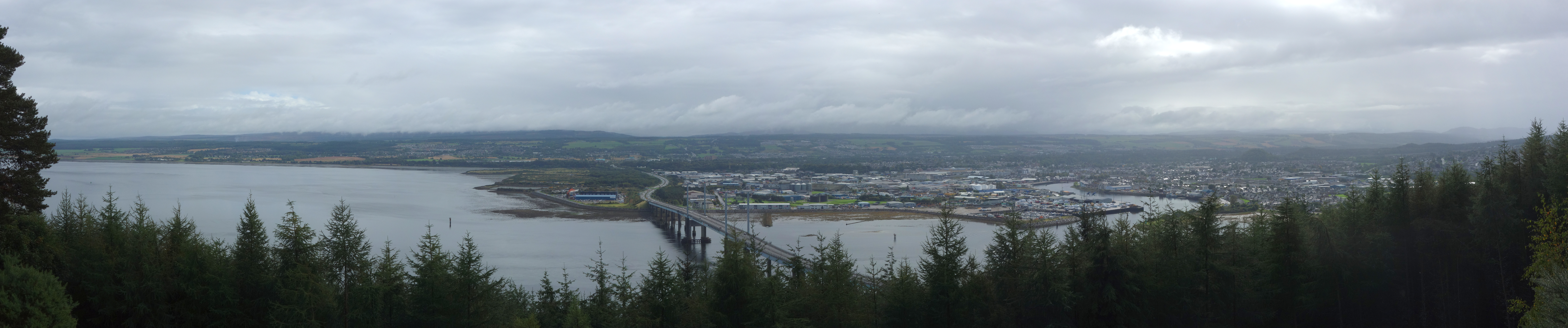
Panorama of Inverness from the Black Isle, with Moray Firth to the left and Kessock Bridge in the centre

Inverness is situated at the mouth of the River Ness (which flows from nearby Loch Ness) and at the south-western extremity of the Moray Firth. The city lies at the end of the Great Glen with Loch Ness, Loch Ashie and Loch Duntelchaig to the west. Inverness's Caledonian Canal also runs through the Great Glen, connecting Loch Ness, Loch Oich and Loch Lochy.

The Ness Islands, a publicly owned park, consists of two wooded islands connected by footbridges and has been used as a place of recreation since the 1840s. Craig Phadraig, once an ancient Gaelic and Pictish hillfort, is a 240 m (790 ft) hill which offers hikes on a clear pathway through the wooded terrain.

Inverness lies on the Great Glen Fault. There are minor earthquakes, usually unnoticed by locals, about every three years; the last to affect Inverness was in 1934.

=== Climate ===
Like most of the United Kingdom, Inverness has an oceanic climate (Köppen: Cfb). The climate here is cooler than in more southerly parts of Britain. The highest temperature recorded was 29.7 °C (85.5 °F) in July 2006 and June 2018, and the lowest recorded was −18.7 °C (−1.7 °F) in January 2010. Typically, the warmest day of the year rises to around 25 °C (77 °F) and the coldest night falls to around −11 °C (12 °F). The climate in this area is characterised by relatively small differences between annual high and low temperatures, as well as adequate rainfall year-round.

Climate data for Inverness, elevation: 13 m (43 ft), 1991–2020 normals, extremes 1960–present
Month	Jan	Feb	Mar	Apr	May	Jun	Jul	Aug	Sep	Oct	Nov	Dec	Year
Record high °C (°F)	11.9 (53.4)	12.7 (54.9)	19.4 (66.9)	23.7 (74.7)	26.6 (79.9)	29.7 (85.5)	29.7 (85.5)	29.1 (84.4)	25.8 (78.4)	20.3 (68.5)	15.4 (59.7)	11.4 (52.5)	29.7 (85.5)
Mean daily maximum °C (°F)	7.1 (44.8)	7.6 (45.7)	9.5 (49.1)	12.1 (53.8)	14.8 (58.6)	17.0 (62.6)	19.0 (66.2)	18.7 (65.7)	16.5 (61.7)	12.9 (55.2)	9.5 (49.1)	7.3 (45.1)	12.7 (54.9)
Daily mean °C (°F)	4.2 (39.6)	4.5 (40.1)	5.9 (42.6)	8.1 (46.6)	10.6 (51.1)	13.2 (55.8)	15.1 (59.2)	15.0 (59.0)	12.8 (55.0)	9.5 (49.1)	6.5 (43.7)	4.4 (39.9)	9.2 (48.6)
Mean daily minimum °C (°F)	1.3 (34.3)	1.4 (34.5)	2.4 (36.3)	4.1 (39.4)	6.4 (43.5)	9.4 (48.9)	11.3 (52.3)	11.2 (52.2)	9.1 (48.4)	6.1 (43.0)	3.5 (38.3)	1.5 (34.7)	5.7 (42.3)
Record low °C (°F)	−18.7 (−1.7)	−17.2 (1.0)	−12.8 (9.0)	−6.3 (20.7)	−4.1 (24.6)	−1.2 (29.8)	2.4 (36.3)	1.2 (34.2)	0.2 (32.4)	−4.5 (23.9)	−11.7 (10.9)	−16.8 (1.8)	−18.7 (−1.7)
Average precipitation mm (inches)	76.2 (3.00)	60.6 (2.39)	52.6 (2.07)	40.6 (1.60)	56.1 (2.21)	61.7 (2.43)	62.0 (2.44)	64.9 (2.56)	62.8 (2.47)	78.1 (3.07)	66.8 (2.63)	72.8 (2.87)	755.0 (29.72)
Average precipitation days (≥ 1.0 mm)	13.6	12.3	12.5	10.1	11.4	11.7	11.5	12.4	11.7	13.7	13.1	14.1	147.9
Mean monthly sunshine hours	40.4	74.3	110.1	143.9	183.6	142.8	139.2	135.8	117.2	82.5	52.2	27.7	1,249.7
Source 1: Met Office
Source 2: KNMI

== Health ==
Raigmore Hospital is the main hospital in Inverness and the entire Highland region. The present hospital opened in 1970, replacing wartime wards dating from 1941.

Raigmore is a teaching hospital for the universities of Aberdeen and Stirling. A Centre for Health Science (CfHS) is located behind the hospital. This is funded by Highlands and Islands Enterprise, the Scottish Government and Johnson & Johnson. Phase I of this opened in early 2007, with phase II and phase III housing The Diabetes Institute opening in 2009. The University of Stirling moved its nursing and midwifery teaching operations from Raigmore Hospital to the CfHS. The University of the Highlands and Islands also has strong links with the Centre through its Faculty of Health.

== Economy ==
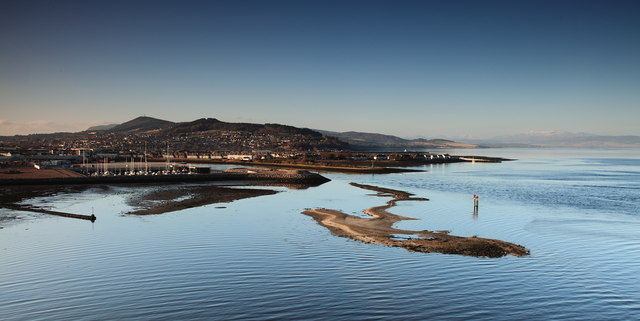
Entrance into Inverness harbour during low tide

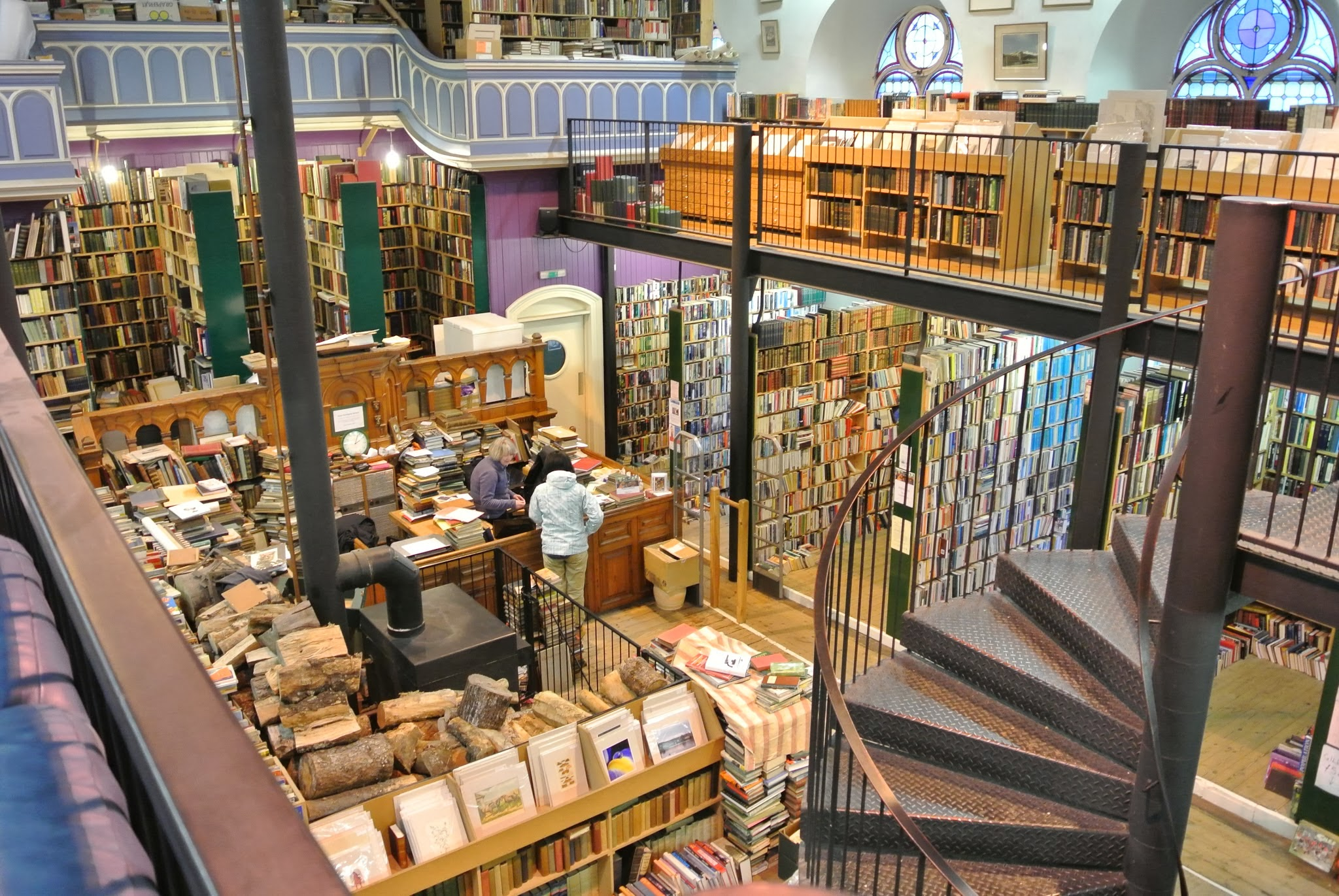
Leakey's Bookshop, a used bookstore located in a listed building of Inverness

Most of the traditional industries such as distilling have been replaced by high-tech businesses, such as the design and manufacture of diabetes diagnostic kits (by LifeScan). Highlands and Islands Enterprise has principally funded the Centre for Health Science to attract more businesses in the medical and medical devices business to the area. Inverness is home to Scottish Natural Heritage following that body's relocation from Edinburgh under the auspices of the Scottish Government's decentralisation strategy. SNH provides a large number of jobs in the area.

Inverness city centre lies on the east bank of the river and is linked to the west side of the town by three road bridges: Ness Bridge, Friars Bridge and the Black (or Waterloo) Bridge – and by one of the town's suspension foot bridges, the Greig Street Bridge.

The traditional city centre was a triangle bounded by High Street, Church Street and Academy Street, within which Union Street and Queensgate are cross streets parallel to High Street. Between Union Street and Queensgate is the Victorian Market, which contains a large number of small shops.

The main Inverness railway station lies almost directly opposite the Academy Street entrance to the market. From the 1970s, the Eastgate Shopping Centre was developed to the east of High Street, with a substantial extension being completed in 2003.

== Education ==
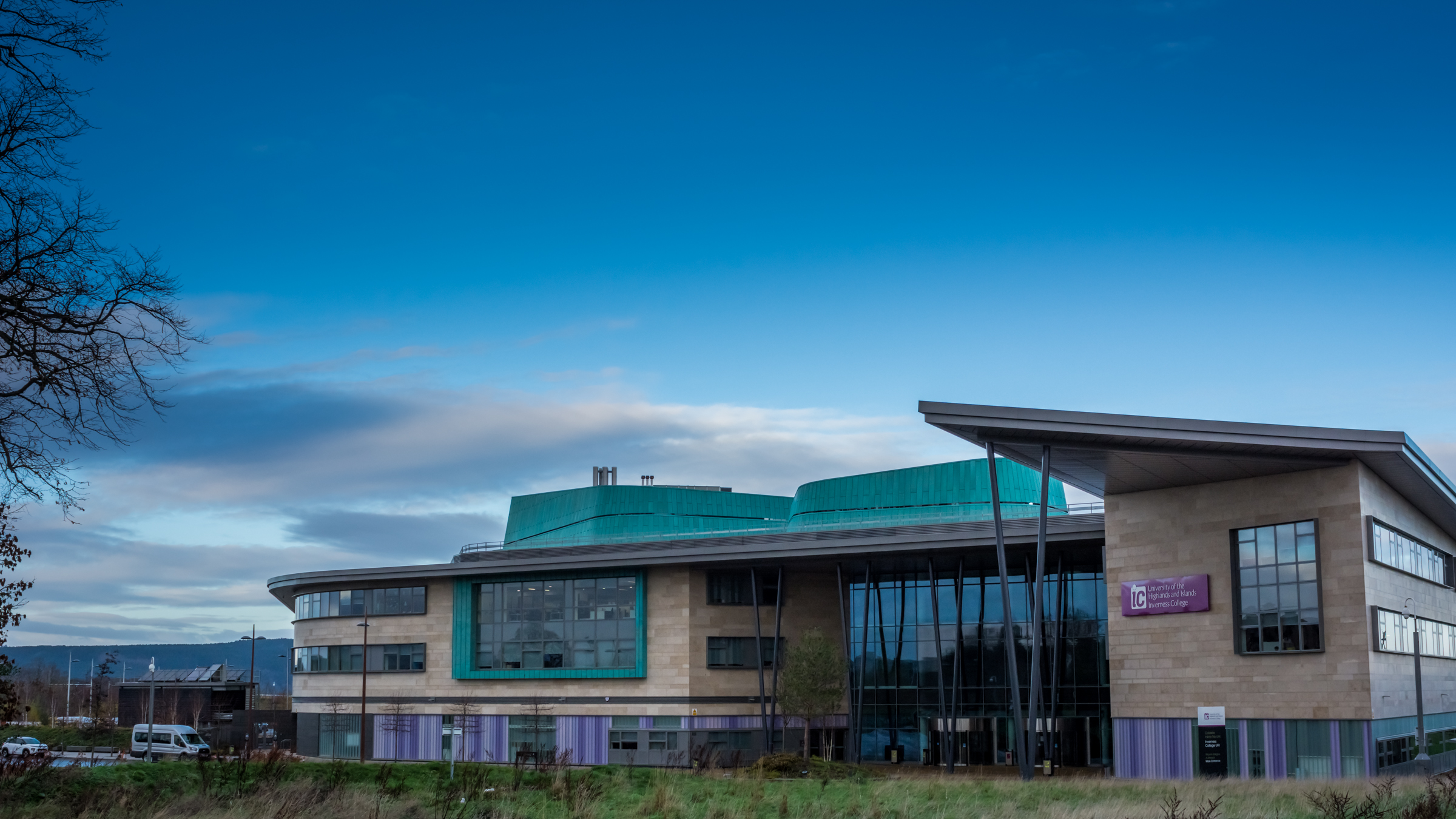
UHI Inverness, a partner of the University of the Highlands and Islands

The city has a number of different education providers. Inverness is catered for by about a dozen primary schools including Bun-sgoil Ghàidhlig Inbhir Nis (Gaelic Primary School), a specialised institution situated at Lochardil. There are five secondary schools: Inverness High School, Inverness Royal Academy, Charleston Academy, Millburn Academy and Culloden Academy. Additionally there is UHI Inverness which offers flexible learning opportunities from access level through to PhD. The city also has a new Centre for Health Sciences, adjacent to Raigmore Hospital.

UHI Inverness is a partner of the University of the Highlands and Islands (UHI), an integrated university encompassing both further and higher education. The university partnership is made up of 12 colleges and research institutions located across the Highlands and Islands, Moray and Perthshire.

In 2015, the college moved to a new location, on the Inverness Campus. The original outline planning application forms a vision for the development over the next thirty years. The application includes:

- Academic buildings – up to 70,480 m^{2}
- Business and incubation units – up to 49,500 m^{2}
- Indoor sports complex – up to 9,000 m^{2}
- Student and other short term residences – 44,950 m^{2}
- Associated landscape, open space, outdoor recreation, infrastructure and services necessary to support the development phases
- Up to 200 residential units
- A social enterprise-run hotel

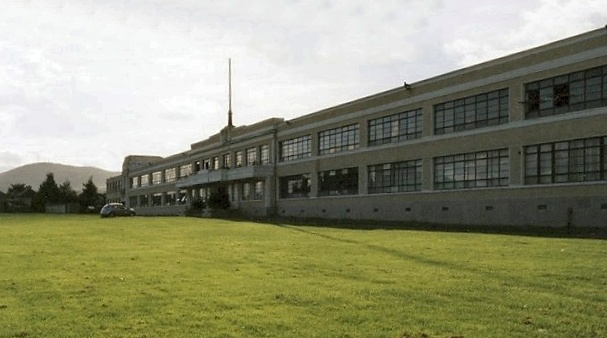
The Art Deco inspired building of Inverness High School

The 80-hectare (200-acre) campus at Beechwood, just off the A9 east of Inverness, is considered to be one of the most important developments for the region over the next 20 years. The principal of UHI, James Fraser, said: "This is a flagship development which will provide Inverness with a university campus and vibrant student life. It will have a major impact on the city and on the Highlands and Islands. UHI is a partnership of colleges and research centres throughout the region, and the development of any one partner brings strength to the whole institution."

It is estimated that the new campus would contribute more than £50m to the economy of the Highlands because it could attract innovative commercial businesses interested in research and development, while increasing the number of students who study within the city by around 3,000.

== Transport ==
=== Roads ===
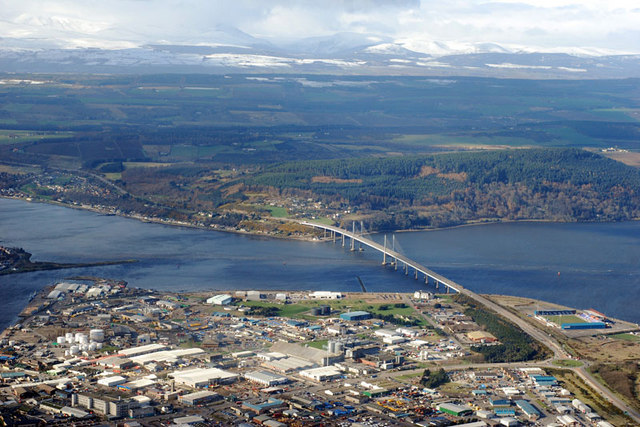
The Kessock Bridge carries the A9 trunk road across the Beauly Firth.

Inverness is linked to the Black Isle across the Moray Firth by the Kessock Bridge. Three trunk roads link Inverness with the rest of Scotland: the A9 north to Thurso and Wick, and south to Perth (carrying European Route E15) and the Central Belt; the A82 to Glasgow via Fort William; and the A96 to Elgin and Aberdeen. Plans are in place to convert the A96 between Inverness and Nairn to a dual carriageway and to construct a southern bypass that would link the A9, A82 and A96 together involving crossings of the Caledonian Canal and the River Ness in the Torvean area, south-west of the town. The bypass, known as the Inverness Trunk Road Link (TRL), is aimed at resolving Inverness's transport problems and has been split into two separate projects: the east and west sections.

In late 2008, the Scottish Government made the controversial decision not to include the full Inverness bypass in its transport plan for the next 20 years. The government's Strategic Transport Projects Review did include the eastern section of the route, which will see the A9 at Inshes linked to the A96. The absence of the TRL's western section, which would include a permanent crossing over the Caledonian Canal and River Ness, sparked dismay among several Highland councillors and business leaders in Inverness who feel the bypass is vital for the city's future economic growth. Ultimately both sections received funding from the Inverness and Highland city-region deal. The eastern section now also includes a commitment to upgrade the Longman Roundabout to a grade separated interchange.

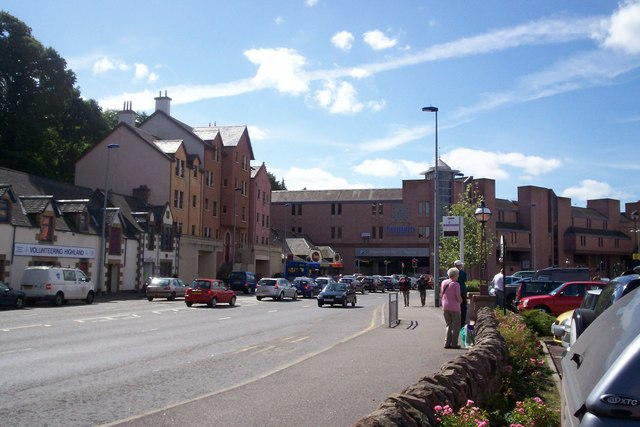
Cars passing through Millburn Road

The east section bypasses the Inshes Roundabout, a notorious traffic bottleneck, linking the existing Southern Distributor with the A9 and the A96, both via grade separated interchanges. This link road separates strategic traffic from local traffic. It also accommodates the proposed developments at Inverness Shopping Park, West Seafield Business Park, Inverness Campus and housing developments at Ashton Farm, Stratton and Culloden West. An indicative timescale for completion of this section is the dualling of the A96 from Inverness to Nairn. The west section is intended to provide an alternate route connecting the A9 with the A82. This bypasses the city centre by providing additional crossings of the River Ness and Caledonian Canal. At the west end, two options for crossing the River Ness and Caledonian Canal were developed. One involving a high level vertical opening bridge which will allow the majority of canal traffic to pass under without the need for opening. The other involved a bridge over the river and an aqueduct under the canal. Both of these designs are technically complex and were considered in detail along by the key stakeholders involved in the project.

Ultimately it was decided that a bridge would be constructed over the River Ness and a second swing bridge be constructed over the Caledonian Canal. This second swing bridge would operate in tandem with the current swing bridge enabling a constant flow of traffic. The works started on site on the 10 June 2019 and include a roundabout, realignment of General Booth Road onto the A82 and a second bridge across the Caledonian Canal. The works were programmed to be complete in December 2020. However, due to a number of construction delays the section was opened in August 2021.

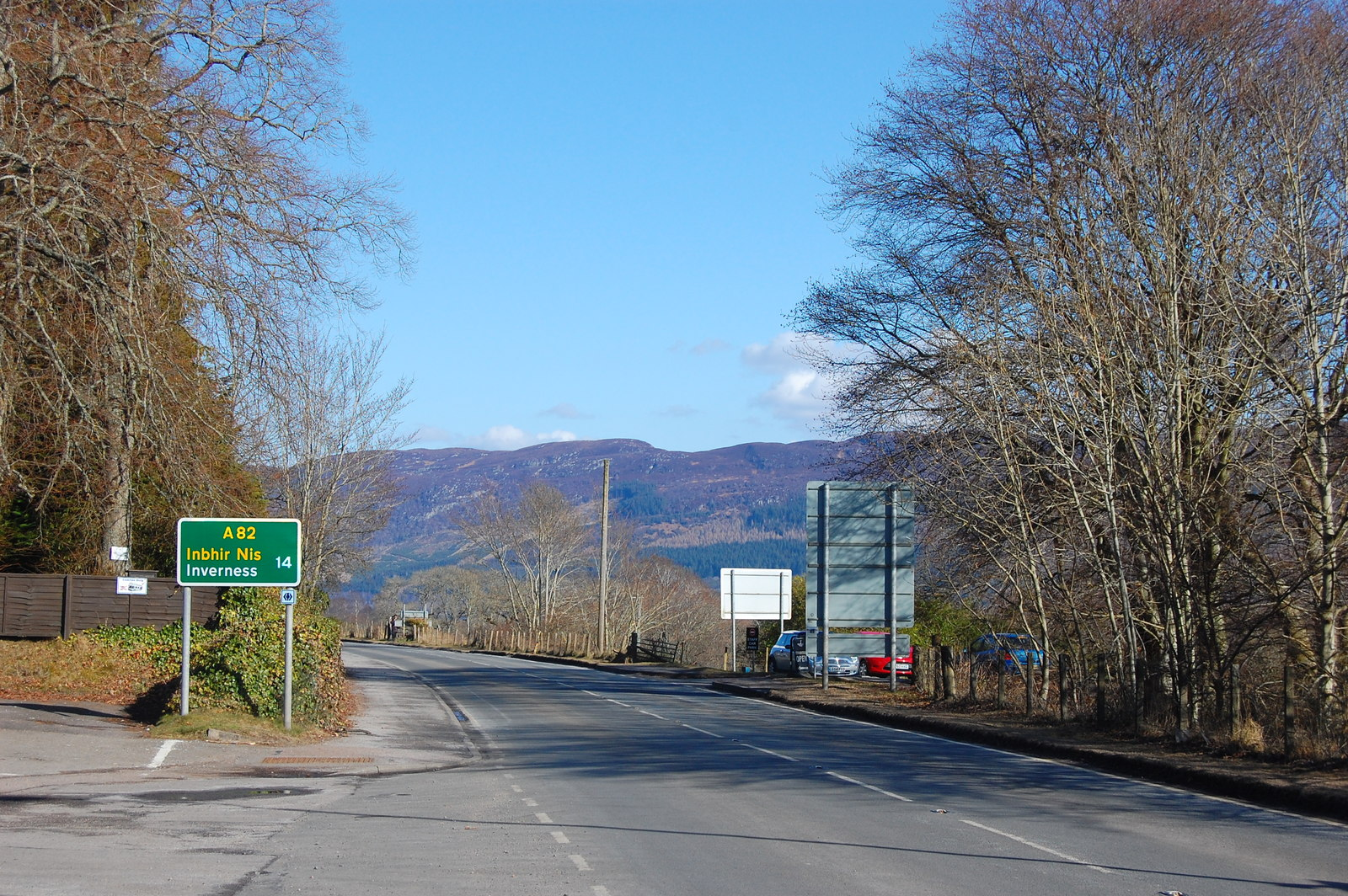
The section leading to Inverness of the A82 road, dubbed "The Inverness Road"

In late 2008, the Scottish Government announced its transport plan for the next 20 years. It brings forward planned improvements to the A9 in an attempt to stimulate the economy and protect jobs. Work costing a total of £8.5 million was undertaken at Moy, Carrbridge and Bankfoot. Northbound overtaking lanes were created and the carriageway was reconstructed at both Moy and Carrbridge. Junction improvements were also made at Moy. In 2011, the Scottish Government announced that it will upgrade the entire road from Perth to Inverness to dual carriageway by 2025. However, in 2023, the project was postponed to 2035, with Michael Gove stating that the A9 had to be dualled north of Inverness to Nigg in order to assist with the UK Government's Levelling Up programme at the port.

In December 2011, the Scottish Government announced its intention to dual the A96 between Inverness and Aberdeen. The project will include upgrading the remaining 86 miles (138 km) of single carriageway along the route to dual carriageway at a cost of £3 billion. The first section to be dualled will be the section between Inverness and Auldearn. This will include a bypass of Nairn and the construction of a number of grade separated interchanges along the route. However, like the A9 Dualling project, this plan has also come under intense scrutiny due to the lack of work taking place, proposals for the project to be rolled back to only dual key areas, rather than a full dualling, and it being left out of a Scottish Budget speech.

=== Buses and coaches ===
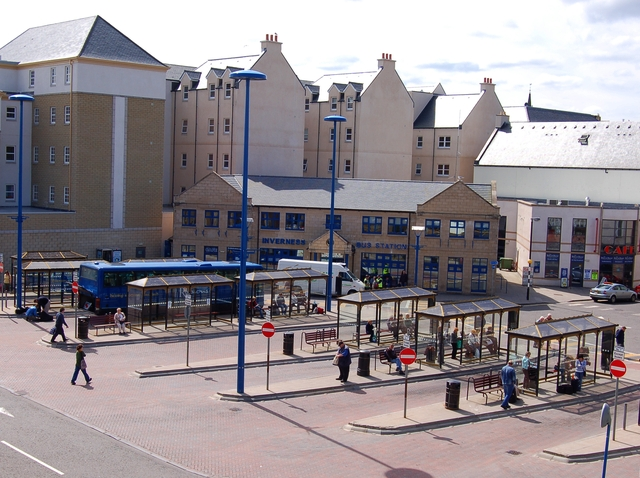
Inverness bus station

Inverness bus station is situated at Farraline Park and can be accessed from Academy Street and Margaret Street. It is managed by The Highland Council and is a short walk away from the railway station and the main shopping area. Permission was granted to demolish the existing bus station in 2000 and was then replaced in the early 2000s. Its main operators include Stagecoach in Inverness and Stagecoach in Lochaber. Buses operate around the town, to the airport and to places as far afield as Fort William, Ullapool, Thurso and Aberdeen. Scottish Citylink operate a regular coach service to Edinburgh, with connections to Glasgow at Perth.

National Express Coaches operates an overnight service to London Victoria via Edinburgh, taking around 15 hours.

=== Railway ===
Rail services are operated by three train operating companies:

- ScotRail services connect Inverness railway station to Perth, Edinburgh Waverley, Glasgow Queen Street, Aberdeen, Thurso, Wick and Kyle of Lochalsh.
- Caledonian Sleeper operates a service six times a week to London Euston
- London North Eastern Railway operates the Highland Chieftain service to London King's Cross, via Edinburgh Waverley, which runs daily.

Inverness Airport station was opened in 2023; services connect to Inverness and Aberdeen.

=== Port of Inverness ===
The Port of Inverness is located at the mouth of the River Ness. It has four quays and receives over 300 vessels a year.

=== Air ===
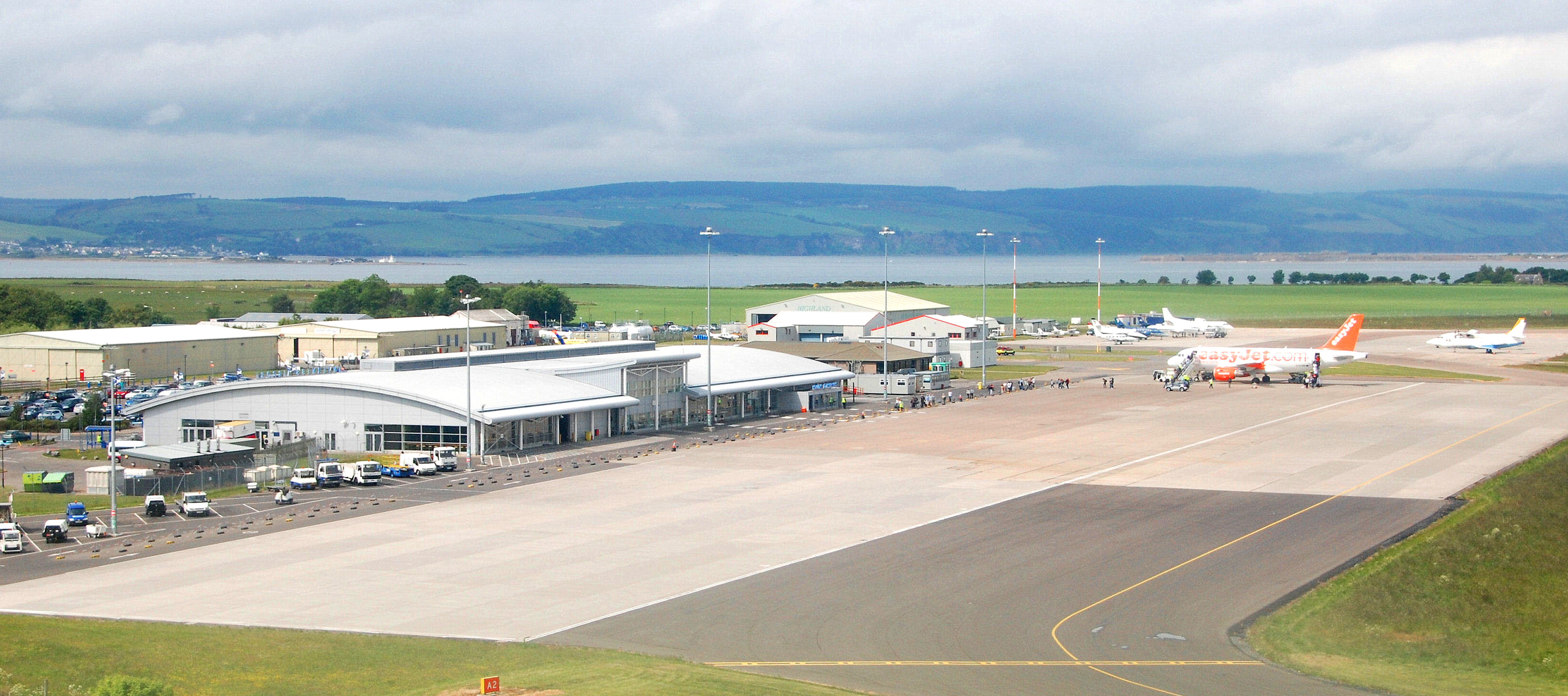
Inverness Airport

Inverness Airport is located 13 km (8.1 mi) north-east of the city and has scheduled flights to airports across the UK including London, Manchester, Belfast and the islands to the north and west of Scotland, as well as a number of flights to Europe.

Loganair operates routes to Benbecula, Dublin, Kirkwall, Stornoway, and Sumburgh. EasyJet operates to London Gatwick three times per day, Luton twice a day and Bristol. British Airways operates a daily service to London Heathrow and KLM operates a daily service to Amsterdam.

== Government ==
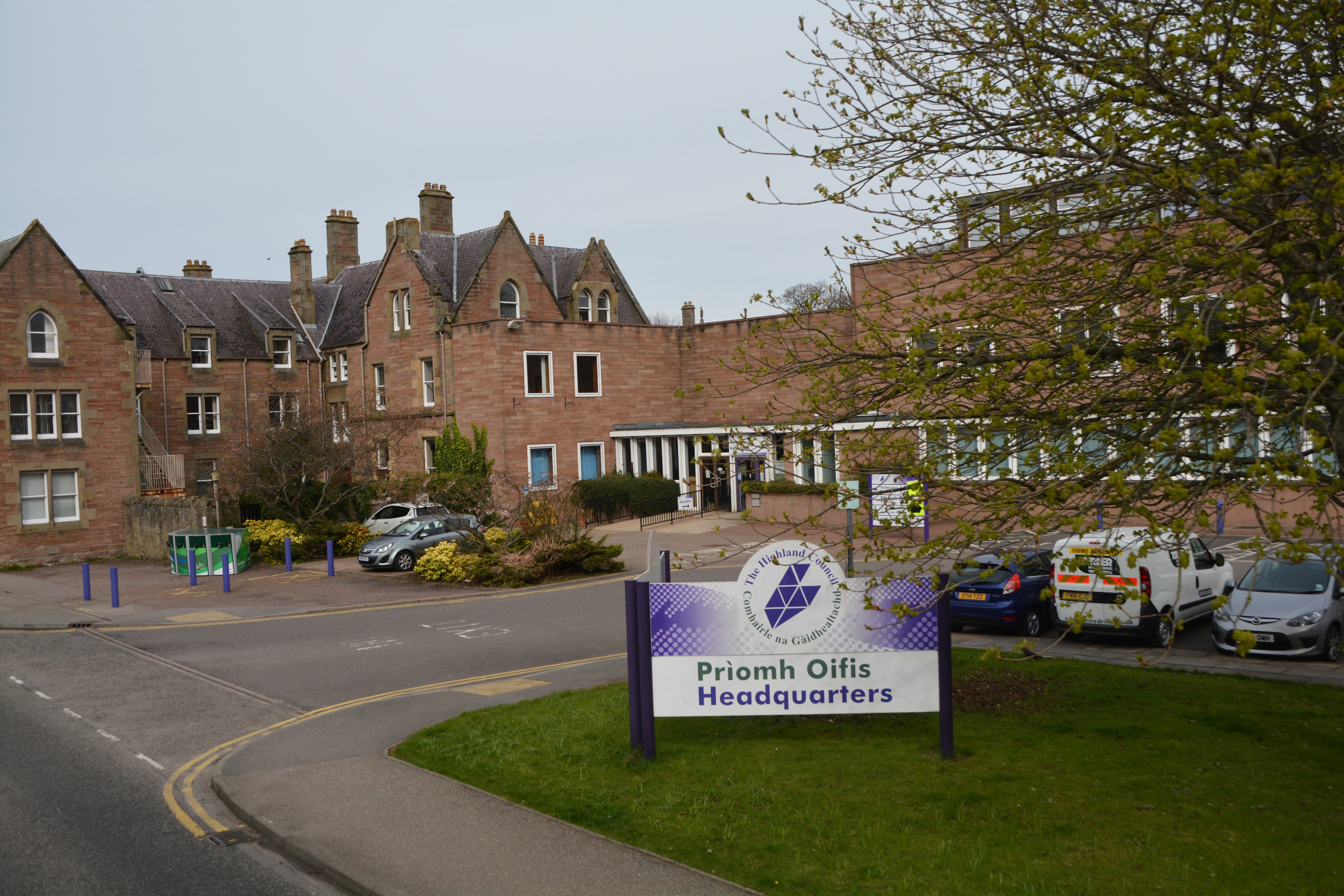
Inverness is the administrative centre for the Highland Council.

There are two tiers of local government covering Inverness. Most functions are provided by the Highland Council, which is based in the city. There is also a lower tier of community councils, with the urban area of Inverness straddling several communities.

=== Administrative history ===
From when it was made a royal burgh in the 12th century, Inverness was governed by the town council of the burgh until 1975. It was also the seat of the Sheriff of Inverness, who had responsibility for administering justice across Inverness-shire. When elected county councils were introduced in 1890 under the Local Government (Scotland) Act 1889, Inverness was considered large enough for its existing town council to provide county-level local government functions, and so it was excluded from the administrative area of Inverness-shire County Council.

Inverness was subsequently brought within the administrative area of the county council in 1930, but classed as a large burgh, allowing the town council to continue to provide most local government services.

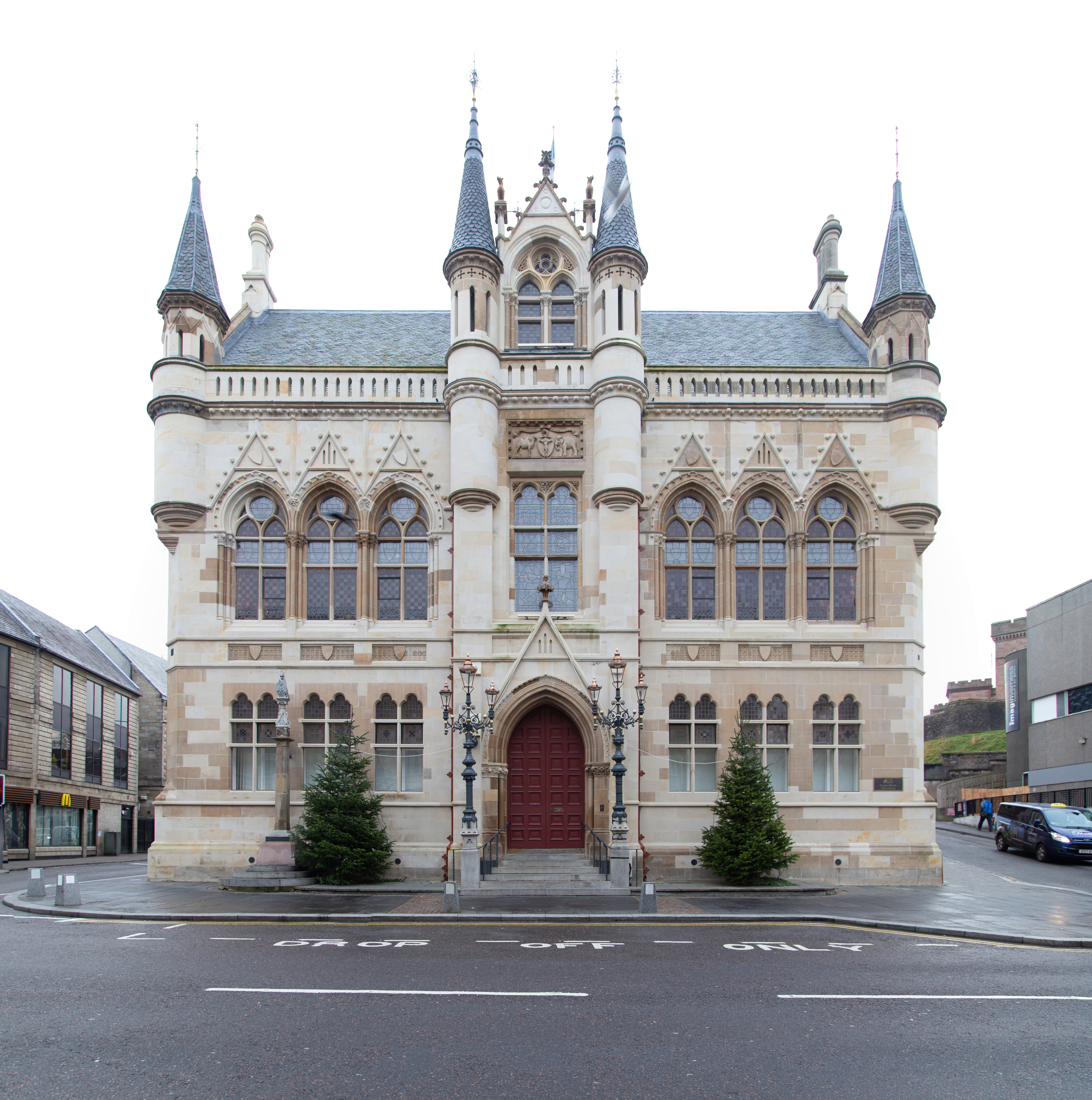
Inverness Town House, High Street, opened 1882

The burgh of Inverness was abolished in 1975 under the Local Government (Scotland) Act 1973, which abolished Scotland's counties, burghs and landward districts and replaced them with a two-tier system of regions and districts. Inverness therefore became part of the larger Inverness district, which was one of eight districts within the Highland region. The Inverness district covered the area of the former burgh plus an extensive rural area around the city, being the area of the two former landward districts of Inverness (covering the rural area generally east of Loch Ness and Inverness itself) and Aird (covering the area generally west of Inverness and Loch Ness). The District Council was based at Inverness Town House on the High Street in the centre of Inverness, which had been completed in 1882 for the old Town Council.

The districts and regions created in 1975 were abolished in 1996, under the Local Government etc. (Scotland) Act 1994 and replaced with single-tier council areas. The Highland region became one of the new council areas.

The Highland Council has a number of area committees for debating local matters. One of the committees is called the City of Inverness Area Committee, comprising the councillors who represent the wards which broadly correspond to the pre-1996 Inverness District. The area committee chooses one of its members to take the title of Provost of Inverness.

=== City status ===
In 2001, city status was granted to the Town of Inverness, and letters patent were taken into the possession of the Highland Council by the convener of the Inverness area committee.

These letters patent, which were sealed in March 2001 and are held by Inverness Museum and Art Gallery, create a city of Inverness, but do not refer to any defined boundaries for the city. In January 2008, a petition to matriculate armorial bearings for the City of Inverness was refused by Lord Lyon King of Arms on the grounds that there is no legal body (such as a council) to which arms for Inverness can be granted.

=== Parliamentary representation ===
There are two existing parliamentary constituencies with Inverness as an element in their names:

- One county constituency of the House of Commons of the Parliament of the United Kingdom (Westminster):
  - Inverness, Skye and West Ross-shire (first established in 2024 and replacing the previous Inverness, Nairn, Badenoch and Strathspey, which existed between 2005 and 2019) currently represented by Angus MacDonald of the Scottish Liberal Democrats
- One constituency of the Scottish Parliament (Holyrood), created in 2011:
  - Inverness and Nairn, currently represented by Scottish National Party Member of the Scottish Parliament (MSP) Fergus Ewing

These existing constituencies are effectively subdivisions of the Highland council area, but boundaries for Westminster elections are now very different from those for Holyrood elections. The Holyrood constituencies are also subdivisions of the Highlands and Islands electoral region.

Historically there have been six Westminster constituencies:

- One burgh constituency:
  - Inverness Burghs, 1708 to 1918
- Five county constituencies:
  - Inverness-shire, 1708 to 1918
  - Inverness, 1918 to 1983
  - Inverness, Nairn and Lochaber, 1983 to 1997
  - Inverness East, Nairn and Lochaber, 1997 to 2005
  - Ross, Skye and Inverness West, 1997 to 2005

Inverness Burghs was a district of burghs constituency, covering the parliamentary burghs of Inverness, Fortrose, Forres, and Nairn. Inverness-shire covered, at least nominally, the county of Inverness minus the Inverness parliamentary burgh. As created in 1918, Inverness covered the county minus Outer Hebridean areas, which were merged into the Western Isles constituency. The Inverness constituency included the former parliamentary burgh of Inverness. As created in 1983, Inverness, Nairn and Lochaber was one of three constituencies covering the Highland region, which had been created in 1975. As first used in 1997, the Inverness East, Nairn and Lochaber, and Ross, Skye and Inverness West constituencies were effectively two of three constituencies covering the Highland unitary council area, which had been created in 1996.

== Culture ==
=== Twin towns and sister cities ===
Inverness is twinned with:

- Augsburg, Germany (1956)
- La Baule-Escoublac, France (1981)
- Saint-Valery-en-Caux, France (1987)

=== Arts and events ===
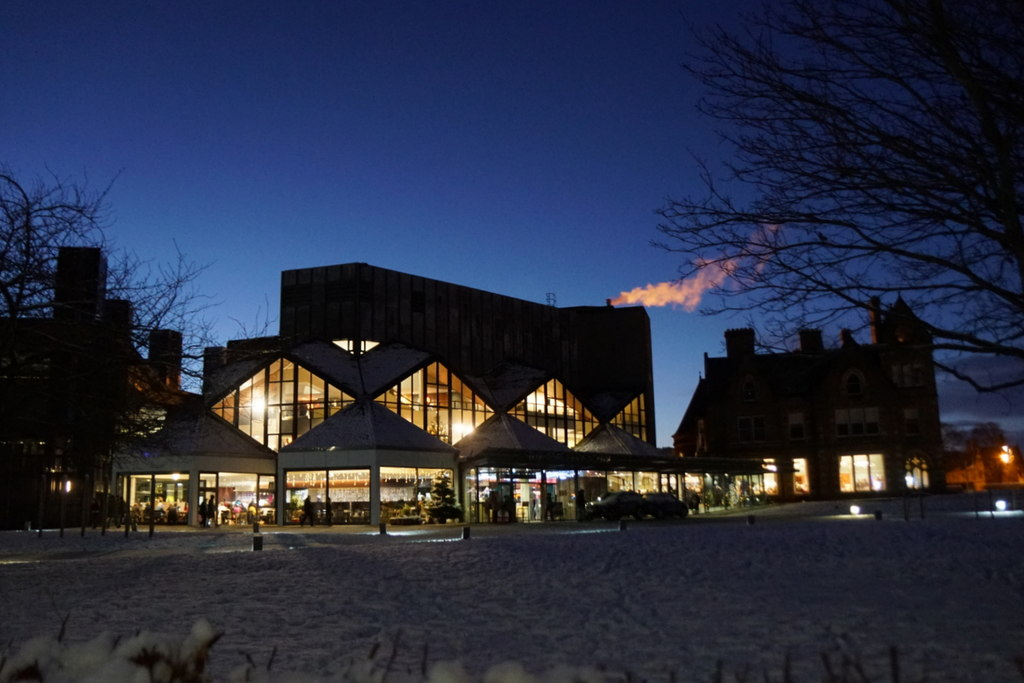
Eden Court Theatre

The main theatre, cinema and arts centre in Inverness is called Eden Court Theatre. Other venues in the city include Inverness Museum and Art Gallery, The Iron Works, the Northern Meeting Park and Inverness Creative Academy. Inverness is an important centre for bagpipe players and lovers, since every September the city hosts the Northern Meeting. The Inverness cape, a garment worn in the rain by pipers the world over, is not necessarily made in the city.

Another major event in calendar is the annual City of Inverness Highland Games. The event can trace its roots back to one of the first Highland Games staged in the modern era; the True Highland Games which was staged in 1822 by members of the Northern Meeting Society. In 1864, the Northern Meeting Society built the world's first Highland Games stadium, the Northern Meeting Park. The last Northern Meeting Highland Games was staged in 1938 and, following the Second World War, responsibility for the organisation of the annual event passed to the Town Council who moved the event to Bught Park in 1948. In 2006, Inverness hosted Scotland's biggest ever Highland Games over two days in July, featuring the Masters' World Championships, the showcase event for heavies aged over 40 years. The first year that the Masters' World Championships had been held outside the United States was 2006 and it attracted many top heavies from around the world to the Inverness area. The Masters World Championships returned in 2009 when it was staged as part of the Homecoming celebrations. In 2010, the City of Inverness Highland Games returned to Northern Meeting Park where it remains to this day. Actress Karen Gillan is the ambassador for Theatre Art Education.

Inverness has gained notoriety as well for being featured in the Outlander novel series by author Diana Gabaldon. The Tartan Heart Festival in the nearby village of Kiltarlity, is a summer festival that brings a variety of music to the area. BFBS Radio broadcasts on 87.7FM as part of its UK Bases network.

Inverness Botanic Gardens is located in Bught Park, a few minutes walk from the west bank of the River Ness, near to the Ness Islands.

In 2007, the city hosted Highland 2007, a celebration of the culture of the Highlands, and also hosted the World Highland Games Heavy Championships and European Pipe Band Championships. In 2008, the first Hi-Ex (Highlands International Comics Expo) was held at the Eden Court Theatre.

Inverness is the location of Macbeth's castle in Shakespeare's play. The library is located in Farraline Park, housed in what was originally the Bell's school, designed by William Robertson in the Greek Revival style. The school was built with help from a £10,000 donation from Dr Andrew Bell in 1837.

=== Media ===
BBC Scotland has a studio in the city which broadcasts the local opt-out of BBC Radio Scotland and BBC Radio nan Gàidheal.

Television signals are received from the Rosemarkie TV transmitter and the local relay transmitter situated in the centre of the city.

The commercial radio station, Moray Firth Radio (MFR), is also based in the city located on Scorguie Place.

The Inverness Courier is the local weekly newspaper which publishes on Fridays.

=== Language ===
Historically, Inverness had a solidly Scottish Gaelic speaking population, with the majority of the population having Gaelic as their first language. From approximately the end of the 19th century, particularly following the 1872 Education Act, which made school attendance compulsory and required that only English be taught and tolerated in the schools on pain of corporal punishment, Inverness suffered a decline in the number of Gaelic speakers in line with the rest of the once Gaidhealtachd / Scottish Highlands. Despite the local dialect of Scottish Gaelic gradually falling out of use (although it continued to affect the local Highland English dialect), the language is still spoken locally in other dialects and the main standardised form. By the end of the 19th century, some rural areas to the south east of Inverness still had completely Gaelic-speaking populations, such as Strath Dearn where almost 100% of the population were still Gaelic speaking.

1677: Inverness was described as "overwhelmingly" Gaelic speaking by the traveller Thomas Kirk.

1704: Close to 100% of the population was fluent in Gaelic with over 75% of the population only able to speak Gaelic. Edward Lhuyd published major work on Inverness Gaelic and after collecting data from between 1699 and 1700, his findings showed a distinct dialect in the area. The clear dialect of Inverness Gaelic was held in high regard by speakers of other forms, such as those from Lewis, Sutherland and Ross. Gaelic remained the principal language of Invernessians for the rest of the 18th century, despite growing pressure from outwith the Highlands in both political and social contexts.

1798: Thomas Garnett, Professor of Natural Philosophy and Chemistry in the Royal Institution of Great Britain, observed that Inverness had become largely bilingual with Invernessians using Gaelic as the language of the home but English as the language of foreign trade – however, the older generation at the time generally only knew Gaelic. Speaking of those in the countryside immediately surrounding Inverness, Garnett stated that although in Inverness both Gaelic and English "are spoken promiscuously...the language of the country people is Gaelic."

1828: John Wood praised the standard of both the Gaelic and English spoken in Inverness stating that both languages were spoken with "utmost purity." He noted that children would casually flit between the two languages while playing, asking questions in Gaelic while receiving answers in English and vice versa.

1882: The Celtic Magazine, published in Inverness, complained that enumerators of the 1881 census who assessed whether families were Gaelic speaking, English speaking or both, had supplied false information. The magazine wrote that "whole families .... scarcely any member of whom can express the commonest idea intelligently in English – who are in every sense Gaelic-speaking people only – were returned by the enumerators as English-speaking."

1901: Inhabitants of Inverness voiced regret at the very swift decay of the native language in the short space of twenty years following a complete absence of bilingual education and disregard for Gaelic.

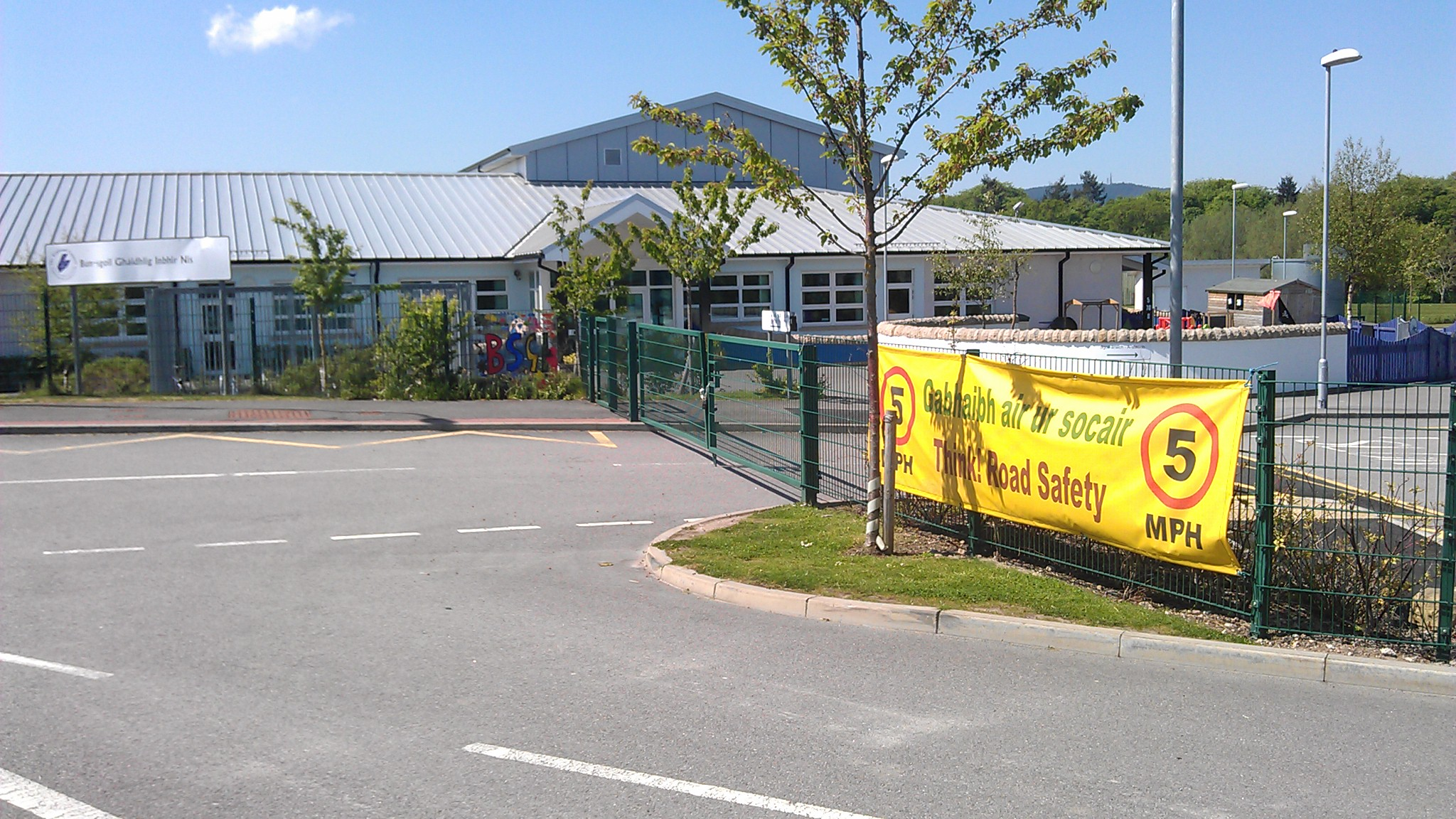
Inverness Gaelic Primary School opened in 2007.

The number of Gaelic speakers has fluctuated over the last century. In 1881, the census reported 4,047 Gaelic speakers in Inverness (23.3% of the population) which by 1891 had risen to 6,356 speakers (30.47%). By 1901 this figure had dropped to 5,072 speakers (23.88%) of the population, from which it continued to drop to present day numbers through emigration and language shift. Scottish Gaelic is slowly re-appearing in the linguistic landscape, appearing on some signs around Inverness. Bun-sgoil Ghàidhlig Inbhir Nis, which opened in August 2007 as a primary school of Scottish Gaelic-medium education, is nearing full capacity and was extended to allow for more pupils in August 2010.

For a city of its size, Inverness today has a relatively high density of Gaelic speakers and a relatively lively Gaelic scene, making it one of the centres of the Scottish Gaelic Renaissance. According to the 2011 census, 4.8% of residents of greater Inverness over age 3 speak Gaelic compared to 1.1% nationally. At 2,800 Gaelic speakers, only Greater Glasgow and Edinburgh have a higher absolute total. Bòrd na Gàidhlig, an organisation responsible for supporting and promoting the use of Scottish Gaelic nationwide, has its main office in Inverness. Other Gaelic related groups include the Inverness Gaelic Choir which has existed for over 70 years. Inverness also hosted the Royal National Mòd in 2014, a festival, inspired by the Welsh Eisteddfod, celebrating Scottish Gaelic culture, literature, and music.

=== Cityscape ===
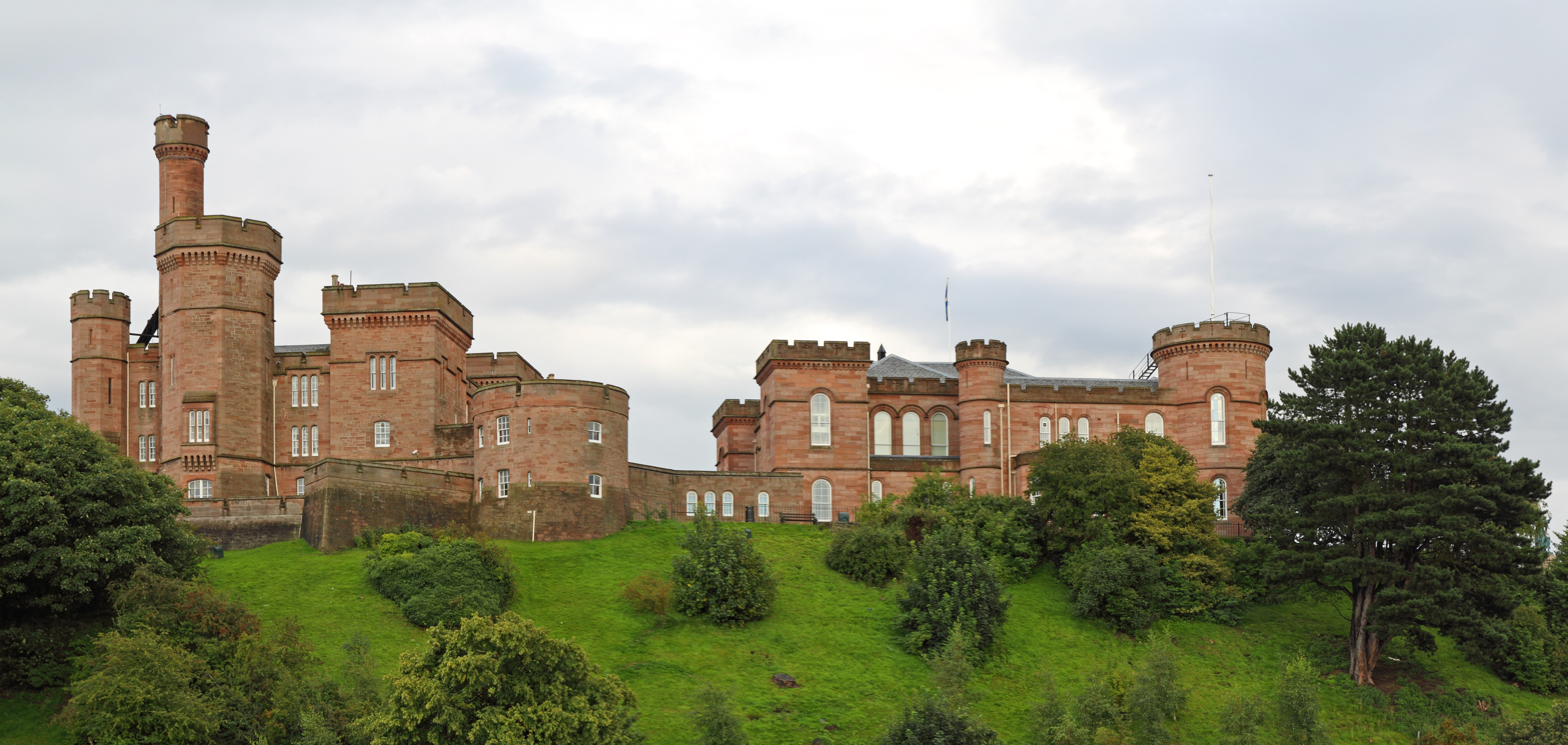
Inverness Castle

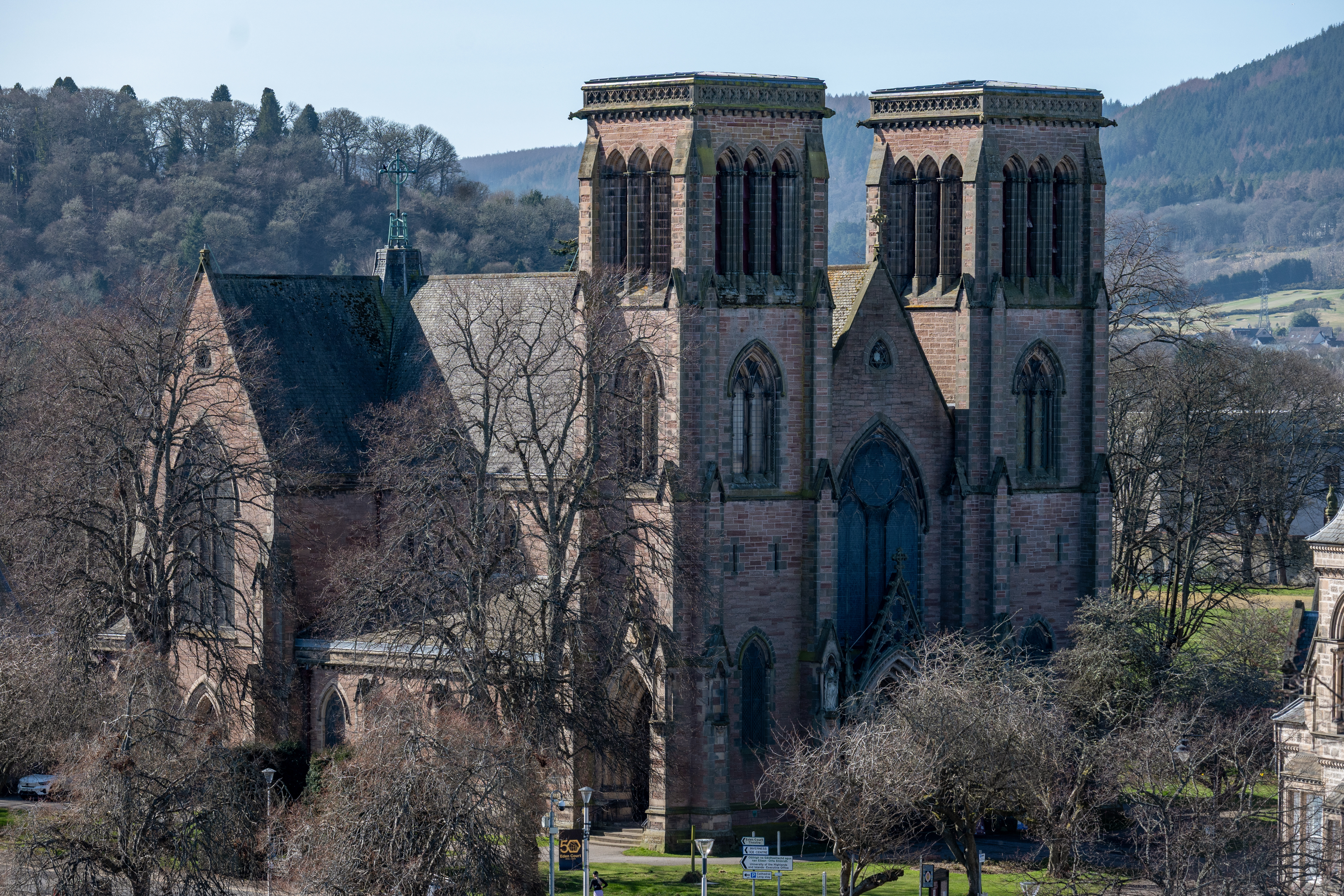
St. Andrew's Cathedral, on the banks of the River Ness

Important buildings in the city include Inverness Castle and several churches. The castle was built in 1835 on the site of its medieval predecessor. Until 30 March 2020, it housed Inverness Sheriff Court; this has now been moved to the Inverness Justice Centre.

Inverness Cathedral, dedicated to St Andrew, is a cathedral of the Scottish Episcopal Church and seat of the ordinary of the Diocese of Moray, Ross and Caithness. The cathedral has a curiously square-topped look to its spires, as funds ran out before they could be completed.

The oldest church is the Old High Church, on St Michael's Mount by the riverside, a site perhaps used for worship since Celtic times. The church tower dates from medieval times, making it the oldest surviving building in Inverness. It is used by the Church of Scotland congregation of Old High St Stephen's, Inverness and it is the venue for the annual Kirking of the council, which is attended by local councillors.

There is no Catholic cathedral in the area, as the Diocesan cathedral (St Mary) is at Aberdeen. The Catholic population is served by two parish churches: St Mary's, Inverness founded in 1837, is the older of the two and the first Catholic parish founded and built in Inverness after nearly three hundred years of religious persecution was ended by Catholic Emancipation in 1829. St Ninian's was built during the 1960s and 1970s.

Porterfield prison, officially HMP Inverness, serves the courts of the Highlands, Western Isles, Orkney Isles and Moray, providing secure custody for all remand prisoners and short-term adult prisoners, both male and female, who are segregated.

== Sport and leisure ==
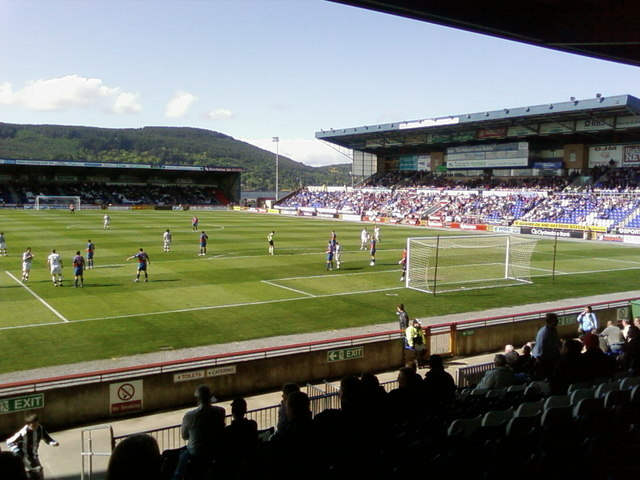
Caledonian Stadium, home of Inverness Caledonian Thistle

Inverness is connected to three long-distance footpaths:

- The Great Glen Way – connects to Fort William along the Great Glen
- The John o' Groats Trail – connects to John o' Groats along the coast
- The South Loch Ness Trail – connects to Fort Augustus along the south-east side of Loch Ness

=== Football ===
Inverness Caledonian Thistle - Caley Thistle is the city's primary football club, founded as Caledonian Thistle in 1994 from the merger of Highland League Clubs, Caledonian and Inverness Thistle, to gain election into the Scottish Football League. The club rose all the way to the top flight of Scottish football in 2004, being a mainstay in the league, and winning the Scottish Cup and playing in the UEFA Europa League in 2015, until 2017, when the club was relegated back to the Scottish Championship, and as low as League One in 2025. The club currently plays in the Scottish Championship. The club play in the Longman area at the Caledonian Stadium, which replaced their Telford Street ground in 1996.

Clachnacuddin - Clach are the oldest football club in Inverness and are one of only two founding members of the Highland League still competing. They hold the record (alongside Caledonian) for most Highland League titles won, most recently in 2004. Their name is an approximate anglicisation of "Clach na Cuddain", meaning "Stone of the Tub", referencing a landmark that currently sits outside the Town House. Clach play their home games at Grant Street Park in Merkinch, where they have done since they were founded in 1885.

Inverness Athletic - Athletic were formed in 2016, and currently compete in the North Caledonian League. Since founding, Athletic have been a nomadic side, due to so few pitches being available in Inverness. They currently play at Pavilion Park, in Muir of Ord, 13 miles west of Inverness

Inverness Thistle - Thistle were founded in 2024 as a new club, with no relation to the original club other than name, they also compete in the North Caledonian League. Thistle play at Ferry Brae Park in North Kessock.

Alongside the four teams in the pyramid, Inverness has been home to many smaller football clubs, mainly in the Highland League due to the inaccessibility to be promoted into the SFA Pyramid until 2013, and it being the most senior league in the area available to clubs. Inverness Union, Inverness Citadel, Clachnacuddin, Caledonian and Inverness Thistle were all founder members of the Highland League in 1893, with Inverness Celtic joining in 1897 before disappearing a few years later. Inverness Union merged with Inverness Thistle in 1895, and Inverness Citadel folding in 1937. In 2006, Inverness City was founded, playing in the North Caledonian League and the North Region Junior Leagues until being folded in 2019. In 2020, Loch Ness joined the North Caledonian League, making the step up from the Inverness and District League, before withdrawing in 2024.

Outside the pyramid there are two Amateur/Welfare Leagues, in the form of the Inverness and District Football Association, and the Inverness Welfare League, both of which primarily cover Inverness, but also its surrounding villages.

=== Rugby ===
Highland RFC is the local rugby union club that competes in the Scottish National League Division One. It has enjoyed recent promotions in the past several years and continues to be a hub for rugby in the North of Scotland.

=== Other sports ===
Shinty is an integral part of the Highlands and Islands. As the capital of the Highlands, Camanachd Association is based in Inverness and the city often hosts a wealth of Shinty finals such as the Camanachd Cup Final (the pinnacle of Shinty) as well as the international game of Shinty and Irish hurling. Despite Inverness Shinty Club not being particularly successful in recent years, some of the towns and villages that surround the city have been, such as Kiltarlity who are the home of Lovat Shinty Club (recent winners of the MacTavish Cup 2013) and Glen Urquhart.

Highland HC is the local hockey team, it consists of two men's teams, two ladies' teams and a junior team. with both Men's & Ladies' 1st teams in Scottish National Division 2. The Men's 1st team successfully gained promotion from Scottish National Division 3 in 2011.

Inverness Blitz is a charity that promotes the development of American football in the city and the surrounding area. Bught Park, located in the centre of Inverness is the finishing point of the annual Loch Ness Marathon and home of Inverness Shinty Club.

In 2011, Inverness hosted professional golf with the Scottish Open on the European Tour, played at Castle Stuart the week before The Open Championship. Cricket is also played in Inverness, with both Highland CC and Northern Counties playing in the North of Scotland Cricket Association League and seven welfare league teams playing midweek cricket at Fraser Park. Both teams have been very successful over the years.

Stock car racing was staged in the city circa 1973. Inverness has a mixed basketball team, the Inverness Giants, who play exhibition games against local teams throughout the North and Islands.

== Notable people ==
- John Findlater – meteorologist, aviation expert and air crash investigator
- Mike Edwards (Scottish journalist) – journalist
- Stuart Armstrong – footballer for Sheffield Wednesday, and Scotland
- Charlie Christie – footballer
- Ryan Christie – footballer for Bournemouth AFC and Scotland
- Charles Fraser Mackintosh (Teàrlach Friseal Mac An Toisich) – lawyer, author and politician. Born and raised in Inverness and represented the Highlands in Westminster.
- Yvette Cooper – the former Home Secretary and present Foreign Secretary was born in Inverness
- Don Cowie – footballer
- Dorothy de Navarro – lecturer who specialised in Anglo-Saxon literature
- Huntley Duff – cricketer
- Janet Barlow – scientist
- James Alexander Forbes – British Vice-Consul to Mexican California as well as the first British Consul to the American state of California
- William Fraser - New Zealand politician, Mayor of Thames
- Jamie Gillan – American football player for the New York Giants in the NFL
- Karen Gillan – actress, best known as Amy Pond, the Doctor's Companion in Doctor Who and as Nebula in the Guardians of the Galaxy series of the Marvel Cinematic Universe.
- Donald McBane - swordsman and author
- Elspet Gray – actress
- Murray Grigor – Scottish film-maker
- Derry Irvine – former Lord Chancellor (under Tony Blair, former Labour Prime Minister) was born in Inverness
- Malcolm Jones – musician; guitar player for Runrig
- Megan Keith – 10,000 metres runner at the 2024 Paris Olympics for Team GB
- Charles Kennedy – former leader of the Liberal Democrats was born in Inverness
- Russell Knox – golfer who plays on the PGA Tour
- Kevin MacDonald – Footballer
- John A. Mackay – Presbyterian theologian, missionary and educator
- Margaret Mackay – writer
- Mary Macpherson – (Màiri Nic a' Phearsain) poet and political activist, "Great Mairi of the Songs" raised her children in Inverness, where she wrote much of her work.
- John McGinlay – footballer
- Very Rev Mitford Mitchell Moderator of the General Assembly of the Church of Scotland in 1903
- Ethel Moir – nursing orderly with Scottish Women's Hospitals for Foreign Service
- Laura Muir – silver medallist at the Tokyo 2020 Olympics in the 1500 metres sprint for Team GB
- Ali Smith – author, born in Inverness in 1962
- James Sutherland (b. 1881) – football player at the turn of the century, with Caledonian and Burnley
- Mr Egg – MacAcidhouse musician
- Major General Douglas Wimberley - British Army officer, born in Inverness 16 August 1896, service in World War I and World War II
- Josephine Tey – author, born in Inverness in 1896
- Connie Ramsay (born 1988) – Judoka
- Jenny Graham – set the world record for the fastest woman to cycle around the world
- John Macdonald – sportsman who was the first person to represent Scotland at both football & cricket.
- Billy MacDonald – footballer
- Erik Thomson (born 1967) – Scottish-born New Zealand/Australian actor
- Lorne Balfe (born 1976) – composer and record producer of film, television and video game scores.
