= James Sutherland (footballer) =

Scottish footballer (born 1881)

Personal information
- Date of birth: 1881
- Place of birth: Inverness, Scotland
- Position: Winger

Senior career*
Years	Team	Apps	(Gls)
- Caledonian
1899–1901	Burnley	11	(1)
Total		11	(1)
- * Club domestic league appearances and goals

James Sutherland (born 1881, date of death unknown) was a Scottish professional footballer who played as a winger. He started his career with Caledonian in his native Inverness, before moving to Football League First Division side Burnley in 1899. He stayed in Lancashire for two seasons, making eleven league appearances and scoring one goal.
