= Victorian Market =

Shopping arcade in Inverness, Scotland

Coordinates: 57.4791°N 4.2251°W

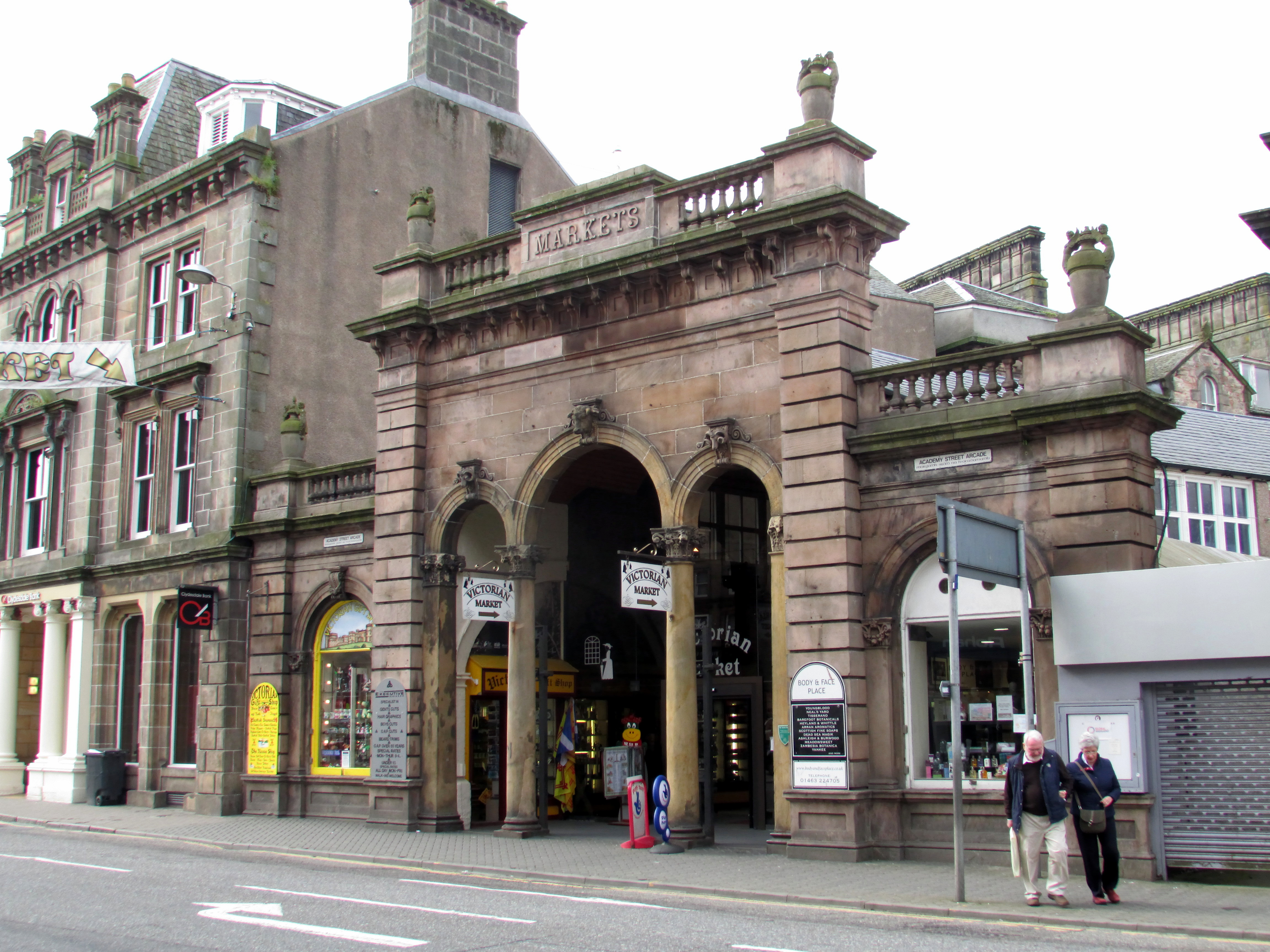
The main entrance of the Victorian Market in 2014

The Victorian Market is a historic covered shopping arcade situated in the city centre of Inverness, Scotland. It was opened in 1870 and originally called New Market. It consists of two intersecting arcades within a city block. It houses more than thirty independent retail shops, including boutiques, cafés, services, and a food hall. The main entrance is dominated by a sandstone arch in neoclassical architecture, designed by William Lawrie.

In 1889 the arcade completely burned down. A new arcade was built and opened on 8 September 1891. There's a story about a dog that ran back to the shop of his owner during the fire to keep watch. Therefore dogs are always welcome in the arcade.
