= Croftnacreich =

Coordinates: 57.51144°N 4.28018°W

- Location within the Ross and Cromarty area
- OS grid reference: NH635491
- Council area: Highland
- Country: Scotland
- Sovereign state: United Kingdom
- Postcode district: IV1 3
- Police: Scotland
- Fire: Scottish
- Ambulance: Scottish

Croftnacreich (/ˌkrɒftnəˈkriːx/) is a hamlet on the Black Isle, in Ross and Cromarty in the Highland council area of Scotland. It is one mile (1.6 km) north-west of North Kessock, next to the A9 road and close to the village of Artafallie.
