= Scottish football league system =

Series of leagues for Scottish football clubs

The Scottish football league system is a series of generally connected leagues for Scottish football clubs.

The Scottish system is more complicated than many other national league systems, consisting of several completely separate systems or 'grades' of leagues and clubs. As well as senior football, there is junior football, and also amateur football and welfare football.

In senior football in Scotland, there is one national league, the Scottish Professional Football League (SPFL), which has four divisions. There are also several regional leagues (most notably the Highland Football League and since 2013 the Lowland Football League). From 2014–15, a promotion/relegation play-off between the two regional leagues and the SPFL national league was introduced.

Two clubs based in England play in the senior Scottish system - Berwick Rangers in the Lowland League and Tweedmouth Rangers in the East of Scotland League. A small number of English amateur clubs in the lowest levels of the game, based on or around the Anglo-Scottish border, also compete in Border Amateur Football League for geographical and travel reasons.

== Men's system ==
Until 2013, Scottish football had no pyramid league system, and as a result it was impossible for clubs in regional leagues to progress into the national leagues, unless a vacancy opened in the Scottish Football League. The final example of this was ahead of the 2008–09 season, where Gretna's demise allowed Annan Athletic to take their place. Overall, the structure of men's football in Scotland was among the most fractured and multi-faceted in Europe, being unique in having a plurality of adult male governing bodies (with Seniors, Juniors, Amateurs, and Welfarers - see below). It was not uncommon for a given town or county to have clubs in as many as three or four separate systems.

Moves towards creating a pyramid system began in 2008 under the tenure of Scottish Football Association (SFA) chief executive Gordon Smith, with discussions between the SFA and the regional and junior leagues. As part of the 2012–13 reconstruction process, Scottish Premier League clubs unanimously agreed on 7 May 2013 to introduce a pyramid structure, merge the national league organisations, revise financial distribution and introduce the possibility of a promotion/relegation play-off between the top two divisions.

=== Senior football ===
The current system has been in place since 2013–14, when the Scottish Professional Football League was formed by a merger of the Scottish Premier League (tier 1) and the Scottish Football League (tiers 2–4). At the same time, the Lowland Football League (tier 5) was founded, and from 2014 to 2021 the leagues below (tier 6) began to be incorporated as each joined the system. For each division, its official name, number of clubs, number of games, and promotion/relegation spots are given:

Tier	Total Clubs (294)	League(s) / Division(s)					
	42	Scottish Professional Football League					
1	12	Scottish Premiership; 12 clubs playing 38 games ↓ 1 relegation spot + 1 relegation playoff spot					
2	10	Scottish Championship; 10 clubs playing 36 games ↑ 1 promotion spot + 3 promotion playoff spots ↓ 1 relegation spot + 1 relegation playoff spot					
3	10	Scottish League One; 10 clubs playing 36 games ↑ 1 promotion spot + 3 promotion playoff spots ↓ 1 relegation spot + 1 relegation playoff spot					
4	10	Scottish League Two; 10 clubs playing 36 games ↑ 1 promotion spot + 3 promotion playoff spots ↓ 1 relegation playoff spot					
	252	Non-League / Regional Leagues					
		61		90		101	
5	51	Highland Football League; 18 clubs playing 34 games ↑ 1 promotion playoff spot ↓ 1 relegation playoff spot		Lowland Football League East; 16 clubs playing 30 games ↑ 1 promotion playoff spot ↓ 2 relegation spots		Lowland Football League West; 17 clubs playing 32 games ↑ 1 promotion playoff spot ↓ 2 relegation spots	
6	92	North Caledonian Football League 13 clubs playing 24 games ↑ 1 promotion playoff spot	North of Scotland Football League; Premier Division 16 clubs playing 30 games ↑ 1 promotion playoff spot ↓ 2 relegation spots + 1 relegation playoff spot	East of Scotland Football League; Premier Division 16 clubs playing 30 games ↑ 1 promotion spot ↓ 3 relegation spots	Midlands Football League 19 clubs playing 36 games ↑ 1 promotion spot	South of Scotland Football League 12 clubs playing 22 games ↑ 1 promotion spot	West of Scotland Football League; Premier Division 16 clubs playing 30 games ↑ 1 promotion spot ↓ 3 relegation spots
7	46		North of Scotland Football League; Championship 14 clubs playing 26 games ↑ 2 promotion spots + 3 promotion playoff spots	East of Scotland Football League; First Division 16 clubs playing 30 games ↑ 3 promotion spots ↓ 3 relegation spots			West of Scotland Football League; First Division 16 clubs playing 30 games ↑ 3 promotion spots ↓ 3 relegation spots
8	39			East of Scotland Football League; Second Division Conferences North West; 12 clubs playing 33 games South East; 11 clubs playing 32 games ↑ 1 promotion spot each ↑ 2 promotion playoff spots each			West of Scotland Football League; Second Division 16 clubs playing 30 games ↑ 3 promotion spots ↓ 3 relegation spots
9	16						West of Scotland Football League; Third Division 16 clubs playing 30 games ↑ 3 promotion spots ↓ TBC relegation spots
10	8						West of Scotland Football League; Fourth Division 8 clubs playing 28 games ↑ TBC promotion spots

The leagues below level four are classed as "non-league football", meaning they are outside the Scottish Professional Football League and are played on a regional not a national basis. The Lowland League was created in 2013–14 and runs in parallel with the Highland League to form level five on the pyramid. Since 2014–15 the two league winners have played off against each other, with the winner then playing the team finishing 10th in League Two in a promotion/relegation play-off for a place in the SPFL. From 2026–27 season, the Lowland League split into Lowland League East and Lowland League West. Subsequently, three league winners will play-off to earn the chance to play the team finishing 10th in League Two, promotion subject to (bronze level) SFA club licencing criteria.

Below the Highland League is the North Caledonian Football League (12 teams, including one reserve team); and the North of Scotland Football League (30 clubs, 2 divisions). Below Lowland League East is the East of Scotland Football League (55 clubs, including one reserve team, 3 divisions); and the Midlands League (19 clubs). Below Lowland League West is the South of Scotland Football League (12 clubs, including one reserve team); and the West of Scotland Football League (72 clubs, 5 divisions). Promotion to Tier 5 is contingent on (entry level) SFA club licensing criteria.

At the start of the 2026–27 season, this totalled 294 teams across 20 divisions.

==== Cup competitions ====
All clubs in tier 5 and above automatically enter the Scottish Cup, along with clubs in other divisions who are full members of the Scottish Football Association. Up to three non-SFA members can qualify for the Scottish Cup each season by winning the East, South or West leagues, or the East, South and West Cup-Winners Shield. All 42 SPFL clubs compete in the Scottish League Cup, along with the Highland and Lowland champions, and one additional invited team. The Scottish Challenge Cup features 30 SPFL clubs from outside the Premiership, Under 21s teams, and four from the Highland and Lowland leagues.

The SFA South Region Challenge Cup is for all 164 non-league clubs in the Lowland area (excluding reserve or B teams). The SFA North Region Challenge Cup existed between 2007 and 2009. There are also a variety of smaller cup tournaments at league and regional level.

=== Junior football ===
Of late, the Scottish Junior Football Association (SJFA) managed two regions: the SJFA East Region of 19 clubs; and the SJFA North Region of 34 clubs (4 clubs withdrew for 2022–23). This represented a total of 53 teams across 3 divisions. The term 'junior' refers not to the age of the players but the level of football played. These two regions joined the pyramid system at tier 6 below the Highland League in 2021–22.

Members of the SJFA, consisting of 114 teams in total from the two regions as well as the East of Scotland League and West of Scotland League (5 teams are in abeyance for 2022–23), participate in the Scottish Junior Cup (now Scottish Communities Cup). Up to three non-SFA members can qualify for the Scottish Cup each season by winning the Midlands League, North Superleague, or the Junior Cup. Banks O' Dee also enter senior tournaments in the Aberdeenshire Cup and Shield, and run an Under-20s team in the Senior development structure (the Aberdeenshire & District League).

In 2020, as part of a long process to form an integrated footballing pyramid structure, all 63 West Region Junior clubs decided to depart and join the newly founded West of Scotland Football League, a feeder to the Lowland League. Between 2017 and 2020 more than half of the East Region clubs departed the junior ranks, joining the senior East of Scotland Football League which is also below the Lowland League. The remaining clubs in the East Premiership South made the same move to the East of Scotland League for season 2021–22, and the East Premiership North clubs formed the Midlands League at tier 6 below the Highland League. The North Region also joined the pyramid structure at the same level. The northern leagues at that level entered the pyramid later in July.

In February 2025, the SJFA acknowledged the request of teams participating in the East and North Regions to become autonomous within the Scottish Football Association structure, which would leave the organisation responsible for the Junior Cup only. The Junior Cup has subsequently been rebranded to the Scottish Communities Cup.

=== Amateur football ===
Again separate from the above, and generally agreed to lie 'below' the senior and junior levels, are the hundreds of clubs in membership of the Scottish Amateur Football Association which oversees 50 leagues - although this includes Sunday League football and futsal competitions. Prestige centres around the historic Scottish Amateur Cup. A number of Senior and Junior clubs run reserve teams in Amateur football. Student and Police football is also affiliated to the SAFA.

As of 2022–23, there are 360 teams – in 12 geographic leagues containing a total of 31 league divisions – playing Saturday football under a regular August–May season. In addition, there are 137 teams playing in four specialist Saturday Morning leagues (including one for Glasgow Colleges Amateur Football Association) in Dundee and Glasgow, plus 22 teams playing in Strathclyde Evangelical Churches Football League.

There are also 90 teams playing in the Summer Saturday leagues (season 2022), most of which are located in the Highland; 244 teams are in the Sunday League system.

==== Saturday Leagues (Winter) ====
Leagues	Divisions		
Aberdeenshire Amateur Football Association 60 clubs	1	Premier Division 14 clubs ↓ TBC relegation spots	
Aberdeenshire Amateur Football Association 60 clubs	2	Division One (North) 14 clubs ↑ TBC promotion spots ↓ TBC relegation spots	Division One (East) 14 clubs ↑ TBC promotion spots ↓ TBC relegation spots
Aberdeenshire Amateur Football Association 60 clubs	3	Division Two (North) 9 clubs ↑ TBC promotion spots	Division Two (East) 9 clubs ↑ TBC promotion spots
Ayrshire Amateur Football Association 37 clubs	1	Premier League 12 clubs ↓ 2 relegation spots	
Ayrshire Amateur Football Association 37 clubs	2	Division 1 11 clubs ↑ 2 promotion spots ↓ 2 relegation spots	
Ayrshire Amateur Football Association 37 clubs	3	Division 2 14 clubs ↑ 2 promotion spots	
Border Amateur Football League 28 clubs	1	A League 13 clubs ↓ 2 relegation spots + 1 relegation playoff spot	
Border Amateur Football League 28 clubs	2	B League 14 Clubs ↑ 2 promotion spots + 1 promotion playoff spot	
Caledonian Amateur Football League 23 clubs	1	Premier Division 14 clubs ↓ 3 relegation spots	
Caledonian Amateur Football League 23 clubs	2	First Division 9 clubs ↑ 3 promotion spots	
Central Scottish Amateur Football League 25 clubs	1	Premier Division 12 clubs ↓ 2 relegation spots	
Central Scottish Amateur Football League 25 clubs	2	Championship 13 clubs ↑ 2 promotion spots	
Greater Glasgow Premier Amateur Football League 41 clubs	1	Division 1 12 clubs ↓ 2 relegation spots + 1 relegation playoff spot	
Greater Glasgow Premier Amateur Football League 41 clubs	2	Division 2 12 clubs ↑ 2 promotion spots + 1 promotion playoff spot ↓ 2 relegation spots + 1 relegation playoff spot	
Greater Glasgow Premier Amateur Football League 41 clubs	3	Division 3A 9 clubs ↑ 1 promotion spots+ 1 promotion playoff spot	Division 3B 8 clubs ↑ 1 promotion spots+ 1 promotion playoff spot
Kingdom of Fife Amateur Football Association 28 clubs	1	Premier League 10 clubs ↓ 2 relegation spots	
Kingdom of Fife Amateur Football Association 28 clubs	2	Championship 9 clubs ↑ 2 promotion spots ↓ 2 relegation spots	
Kingdom of Fife Amateur Football Association 28 clubs	3	Conference 9 clubs ↑ 2 promotion spots	
Lothian & Edinburgh Amateur Football Association (Saturday) 49 clubs	1	Premier Division 12 clubs ↓ TBC relegation spot	
Lothian & Edinburgh Amateur Football Association (Saturday) 49 clubs	2	Championship 12 clubs ↑ TBC promotion spot ↓ TBC relegation spots	
Lothian & Edinburgh Amateur Football Association (Saturday) 49 clubs	3	Division 1 12 clubs ↑ TBC promotion spot ↓ TBC relegation spot	
Lothian & Edinburgh Amateur Football Association (Saturday) 49 clubs	2	Division 2 13 clubs ↑ TBC promotion spot	
Midlands Amateur Football Association 14 clubs	1	Premier Division 14 clubs	
Perthshire Amateur Football Association 21 clubs	1	Division One 10 clubs ↓ 2 relegation spots	
Perthshire Amateur Football Association 21 clubs	2	Division Two 11 clubs ↑ 2 promotion spots	
Scottish Amateur Football League 16 clubs	1	Premier 16 clubs	
Stirling & District Amateur Football Association 11 clubs	1	Premier Division 11 clubs ↓ TBC relegation spots	
Dundee Saturday Morning Amateur Football League 39 clubs	1	Premier Division 12 clubs ↓ 1 relegation spot + 2 relegation playoff spots	
Dundee Saturday Morning Amateur Football League 39 clubs	2	1st Division 12 clubs ↑ 1 promotion spot + 2 promotion playoff spots ↓ 2 relegation spots + 1 relegation playoff spot	
Dundee Saturday Morning Amateur Football League 39 clubs	3	2nd Division 15 clubs ↑ 1 promotion spot + 2 promotion playoff spots	
Glasgow Colleges Amateur Football Association 34 clubs	1	Premier Division 14 clubs ↓ 2 relegation spots	
Glasgow Colleges Amateur Football Association 34 clubs	2	Division One (A) 10 clubs ↑ 1 promotion spot	Division One (B) 10 clubs ↑ 1 promotion spot
Saturday Morning Amateur Football League 64 clubs	1	Premier Division 14 clubs ↓ TBC relegation spots	
Saturday Morning Amateur Football League 64 clubs	2	Championship 14 clubs ↑ TBC promotion spots ↓ TBC relegation spots	
Saturday Morning Amateur Football League 64 clubs	2	Division 1A 14 clubs ↑ TBC promotion spots	Division 1B 12 clubs ↑ TBC promotion spots
Strathclyde Evangelical Churches Football League 22 clubs	1	Premier Division 12 clubs ↓ 1 relegation spot	
Strathclyde Evangelical Churches Football League 22 clubs	2	Division 1 10 clubs ↑ 1 promotion spot	

==== Saturday Leagues (Summer) ====
Leagues	Divisions	
Caithness Amateur Football Association 14 clubs	1	Division 1 8 clubs ↓ 1 relegation spot
Caithness Amateur Football Association 14 clubs	2	Division 2 6 clubs ↑ 1 promotion spot
Inverness & District Amateur Football Association 26 clubs	1	Premier Division 8 clubs ↓ 1 relegation spot
Inverness & District Amateur Football Association 26 clubs	2	1st Division 8 clubs ↑ 1 promotion spot ↓ 1 relegation spot
Inverness & District Amateur Football Association 26 clubs	3	2nd Division 10 clubs ↑ 1 promotion spot
Lewis & Harris Amateur League 9 clubs	1	9 clubs
North West Sutherland Amateur Football League 8 clubs	1	8 clubs
Orkney Amateur Football Association 12 clubs	1	A League 7 clubs ↓ 1 relegation spot
Orkney Amateur Football Association 12 clubs	2	B League 5 clubs ↑ 1 promotion spot
Shetland Amateur Football Association 8 clubs	1	Premier League 8 clubs
West Highland Amateur Football Association 7 clubs	1	7 clubs
Uist & Barra Amateur Football Association 6 clubs	1	6 clubs

==== Sunday Leagues ====
Leagues	Divisions		
Aberdeen Sunday Football Association 17 clubs	1	Premier Division 8 clubs ↓ TBC relegation spots	
Aberdeen Sunday Football Association 17 clubs	2	First Division 9 clubs ↑ TBC promotion spots	
Airdrie & Coatbridge Sunday Amateur Football League 40 clubs	1	Premier Division 12 clubs ↓ TBC relegation spots	
Airdrie & Coatbridge Sunday Amateur Football League 40 clubs	2	Championship Division 13 clubs ↑ TBC promotion spots ↓ TBC relegation spots	
Airdrie & Coatbridge Sunday Amateur Football League 40 clubs	3	First Division 15 clubs ↑ TBC promotion spots	
Angus & Mearns Amateur Football Association 7 clubs	1	Division 1 7 clubs	
Ayrshire Sunday Amateur Football Association 11 clubs	1	Division 1 11 clubs	
Dumfries Sunday Amateur Football League 14 clubs	1	Premier Division 15 clubs	
Fife Sunday Amateur Football League 16 clubs	1	Premier Division 6 clubs ↓ 1 relegation spot	
Fife Sunday Amateur Football League 16 clubs	2	Championship 10 clubs ↑ 2 promotion spots	
Glasgow & District Sunday Championship Amateur Football League 43 clubs	1	Premiership 10 clubs ↓ TBC relegation spots	
Glasgow & District Sunday Championship Amateur Football League 43 clubs	2	Championship 12 clubs ↑ TBC promotion spots ↓ TBC relegation spots	
Glasgow & District Sunday Championship Amateur Football League 43 clubs	3	Division 1 11 clubs ↑ TBC promotion spots ↓ TBC relegation spots	
Glasgow & District Sunday Championship Amateur Football League 43 clubs	4	Division 2 10 clubs ↓ TBC relegation spots	
Lothians & Edinburgh Amateur Football Association (Sunday) 49 clubs		Mornings	Afternoons
Lothians & Edinburgh Amateur Football Association (Sunday) 49 clubs	1	Premier Division 10 clubs ↓ TBC relegation spots	Premier Division 14 clubs
Lothians & Edinburgh Amateur Football Association (Sunday) 49 clubs	2	Championship 11 clubs ↑ TBC promotion spots ↓ TBC relegation spots	
Lothians & Edinburgh Amateur Football Association (Sunday) 49 clubs	3	Division 1 14 clubs ↑ TBC promotion spots	
Football Central Amateur Football League 54 clubs		Lanarkshire	–
Football Central Amateur Football League 54 clubs	1	Premier Division 10 clubs ↓ TBC relegation spots	Premier Division 12 clubs ↓ TBC relegation spots
Football Central Amateur Football League 54 clubs	2	Championship 9 clubs ↑ TBC promotion spots	Championship 12 clubs ↑ TBC promotion spots ↓ TBC relegation spots
Football Central Amateur Football League 54 clubs	3		First Division 11 clubs ↑ TBC promotion spots

=== Welfare football ===
Roughly concurrent with the Scottish Amateur Football Association is the Scottish Welfare Football Association, which has a very low profile nationally. The SWFA was established in the aftermath of World War I, and oversees leagues mainly operating Sunday and summer or midweek football, predominantly in the north of Scotland.

From a peak of over 500 clubs, there were 158 teams in membership in November 2012, down from 238 teams in 2007.

As of Season 2024 (Summer) and 2024–25 (Winter), there were 80 teams in seven geographic leagues, plus 13 clubs playing in the Warriors Premier League.

Leagues	Divisions		
Summer
Forres and Nairn District Welfare Association League 10 clubs	1	West Conference 5 clubs	East Conference 5 clubs
Forth & Endrick Football League 10 clubs	1	10 clubs	
Deeside Welfare Football Association 8 clubs	1	Mid-Deeside Summer League 8 clubs	
Moray & District Welfare Football Association 10 clubs	1	10 clubs	
North East Scotland Welfare Football Association 20 clubs	1	League 1 9 clubs ↓ 2 relegation spots	
North East Scotland Welfare Football Association 20 clubs	2	League 2 11 clubs ↑ 2 promotion spots	
Strathspey & Badenoch Welfare Football Association 6 clubs	1	6 clubs	
Inverness Welfare League 5 clubs	1	5 clubs	
Winter
Greenock & District Welfare League 16 clubs	1	16 clubs	
Warriors Premier League 13 clubs	1	13 clubs	

=== Reserve and Youth football ===
The reserve and youth leagues are mostly governed by the relevant adult leagues.

Leagues		Divisions							
SPFL Reserve League 9 clubs (SPFL Premiership, Championship, League One)	Reserve	1	9 clubs						
Lowlands Development League 95 clubs	Youth (U20)	1	Conference A 13 clubs (SPFL League One, League Two, Lowland League)	Conference B 14 clubs (Lowland League, EoS League)	Conference C 14 clubs (EoS League)	Conference D 13 clubs (EoS League, WoS League)	Conference E 13 clubs (WoS League)	Conference F 14 clubs (WoS League)	Conference G 14 clubs (WoS League)
Aberdeenshire and District League 11 clubs (Aberdeenshire and District FA)	Youth (U21)	1	11 clubs						
North of Scotland FA U20 League 4 clubs	Youth (U20)	1	4 clubs						
Highland League U18 19 clubs	Youth (U18)	1	East 8 clubs			North 11 clubs			
SFA Club Academy Scotland Elite League 10 clubs (CAS Elite Level)	Youth (U11-19)	1	U11	U12	U13	U14	U15	U17	U19
SFA Club Academy Scotland Elite League 10 clubs (CAS Elite Level)	Youth (U11-19)	1	9 clubs - Aberdeen, Celtic, Rangers, Hearts, Hibs, Motherwell, Kilmarnock, St. Mirren, and Dundee United. For 2025/26, Aberdeen FC are not competing at U19 level. Also known as 'Pro-Youth Elite'. These are the youth teams of the associated professional sides. Players are registered as SFA Pro-Youth players, rather than grassroots players and cannot play grassroots football, but can play school football. Hamilton Academical FC were an elite pro-youth academy until the summer of 2025, but have lost their license and are not competing at any level of the CAS structure. However, they have retained an U19 squad to compete in friendlies. Hamilton Academical intend to apply for a license and resume academy operations next season.						
SFA Club Academy Scotland Performance League 10 clubs (CAS Performance Level)	Youth (U11-19)	1	U11	U12	U13	U14	U15	U17	U19
SFA Club Academy Scotland Performance League 10 clubs (CAS Performance Level)	Youth (U11-19)	1	10 clubs - Falkirk, St. Johnstone, Ayr United, Dundee, Dunfermline, Greenock Morton, ICT, Partick Thistle, Livingston, Ross County - NB at U17 and U19 level, Performance and Advanced Youth are combined into one league. Performance tier alone applies up to U15. Also known as 'Pro-Youth Performance'. These are the youth teams of the associated professional sides. Players are registered as SFA Pro-Youth players, rather than grassroots players and cannot play grassroots football, but can play school football. For season 25/26, Dunfermline, Greenock Morton and Ross County have all opted not to field U19 teams in the U19 league, but are fielding teams at U17 level.						
SFA Advanced Youth League 9 clubs (Advanced Youth Programme)	Youth (U17-19)	1	U17			U19			
SFA Advanced Youth League 9 clubs (Advanced Youth Programme)	Youth (U17-19)	1	9 clubs - Queen's Park, Kelty Hearts, Queen of the South, Bonnyrigg Rose, Elgin City, Edinburgh City, Airdrie, Alloa, Montrose - NB, these clubs only compete at U17 and U19 levels in a combined league with the ten 'Performance' tier clubs. Also known as 'Pro-Youth Advanced Youth'. These are the youth teams of the associated professional side. Players are registered as SFA Pro-Youth players, rather than grassroots players and cannot play grassroots football, but can play school football.						
Saturday Morning Amateur Football League Development Section 15 clubs	Youth	1	15 clubs						
Midlands Amateur Football Association Alliance League 12 clubs	Reserve	1	Championship 12 clubs						
Orkney Amateur Football Association Reserve League 8 clubs	Reserve	1	8 clubs						
Shetland Amateur Football Association Reserve League 11 clubs	Reserve	1	11 clubs						
Scottish Youth Football Association Youth Leagues Governing Body for all Grassroots Youth Football	Grassroots Youth (U6 - U18)	1	SYFA Govern all youth grassroots football other than Schools football, which is governed by the Scottish Schools' Football Association. All local youth grassroots bodies are affiliated with the SYFA. Only teams playing within the SFA CAS Pro-Youth structure and School teams sit outwith the jurisdiction of the SYFA. Grassroots youth players are still eligible for school teams. SFA CAS Pro-Youth registered players cannot play in SYFA competitions. The SYFA govern the Scottish Cup for grassroots clubs. Current holders from 25/26 are: West End FC (Aberdeen) (U13), Giffnock SC (East Renfrewshire) (U14), East Side Rapids (Midlothian) (U15), Kilwinning Rangers (North Ayrshire) (U16), Knightswood FC (Glasgow) (U17), East Kilbride FC (South Lanarkshire) (U18).						
Scottish Schools' Football Association Youth Leagues Governing Body for all School Football at National Level	School Football (U13 - U18)	1	SSFA govern school football at Secondary school age as well as regional School select football and National School football v the Home Nations. The SSFA operate five main Shield Events (Scottish Cup) at U13, U14, U15, U16 and U18 age groups, as well as two consolation events (Scottish Plate) at U13 and U14 only. Regional select squads compete for National Trophies at U15 and U18 level, and at U18 level, a National Scottish Schools' team compete against the other Home Nations. The winners of the annual U13 Scottish Cup compete in the British Isles Cup the following year, versus the winners from England, Northern Ireland, Wales, Republic of Ireland and a guest school from the host nation of the year. Current Scottish Cup holders from 25/26 are: Boclair Academy (U13), St. Ninian's High School, Giffnock (U14), Braidhurst High School, Motherwell (U15), Baldragon Academy, Dundee (U16), Newbattle HS, East Lothian (U18/Senior). Scottish Plate holders are Duncanrig Secondary (U13) and The Robert Burns Academy (U14). Current Regional select holders are Ayrshire at U15 and Fife at U18. Boclair Academy, as winners of the U13 school shield, will compete at the 2027 British Isles Cup in May 2027. Both St. Ninian's Giffnock at U14 and Braidhurst HS at U15 have won two titles in sequence with these squads. Newbattle's title is the first the school has ever won. A small number of schools across the country are SFA Performance Schools (Hazlehead Academy, St. John's High School, Grange Academy, Holyrood High School, Braidhurst High School, Graeme High School, Broughton High School), whereby players mainly drawn from clubs within the SFA CAS Pro-Youth system can elect to trial for a place as part of the SFA programme. The Performance School element is led by SFA staff and is an SFA programme rather than an SSFA or club endeavour. Trials, which occur once only at P7 into S1, are also open to grassroots players, but the vast majority of places go to those within the Pro-Youth system who have elected to apply. Many pro-youth players do not apply for places, and attend their catchment schools. The SFA announced that the P7 into S1 intake over the summer of 2026 will be the last, with the performance school model being phased out over the next four years. This means that at the start of academic year 2030/31, there will be no SFA run programmes within any of the seven schools. In addition, a number of professional clubs have formal links with schools in their area, whereby their players attend a specific local school and receive additional training during the school day from club staff. Celtic (St. Ninian's High, Kirkintilloch), Dundee Utd (Baldragon High School), Dundee (St. John's High School) and Rangers (Boclair Academy) all have arrangements in place with specific schools. Rule changes effective as of season 26/27 mean for all competitions, no school can field more than three SFA Performance Players (for those seven schools) or CAS Elite players (for all schools including SFA Performance). This means at any one time during a game, only three total of any combination of SFA Performance and CAS Elite level outfield players can be on the pitch together for the same team. The rule does not extend to Goalkeepers. This rule acts to curb somewhat the propensity of SFA Performance and formal club affiliated schools to field entire academy teams for school football games.						

== Women's system ==
=== Senior football ===
Senior leagues of women's football in Scotland are structured as follows:

Level	League(s) / Division(s)			
	National Leagues			
1	Scottish Women's Premier League 1; 10 clubs playing 28/24 games ↓ 1 relegation spot + 1 relegation playoff spot			
2	Scottish Women's Premier League 2; 10 clubs playing 28 games ↑ 1 promotion spot + 1 promotion playoff spot ↓ 1 relegation spot + 1 relegation playoff spot			
3	Scottish Women's Championship 12 clubs playing 27 games ↑ 1 promotion spot + 1 promotion playoff spot			
4	Scottish Women's League One 11 clubs playing ? games ↑ 2 promotion spots			
	Regional Leagues			
5	Scottish Women's Football League			
5	SWFL North 10 clubs playing 18 games ↑ TBC promotion spots	SWFL East 11 clubs playing 20 games ↑ TBC promotion spots	SWFL South 10 clubs playing 18 games ↑ TBC promotion spots	SWFL West 9 clubs playing 16 games ↑ TBC promotion spots
–	Highlands and Islands League 8 clubs playing 14 games			

=== Youth football ===
Scottish Women's Football National Performance League
	U19		U16
	13 clubs		8 clubs
Scottish Women's Football Youth Regional League (Summer)
	U18	U16	U14
Central	Cross Region Emma Mitchell League 11 clubs	Sam Kerr League 11 clubs	Fiona Brown League 7 clubs Lee Alexander League 8 clubs Nicola Docherty League 7 clubs
West	Cross Region Emma Mitchell League 11 clubs	Leanne Crichton League 13 clubs	Chloe Arthur League 8 clubs Jen Beattie League 13 clubs
South West	Cross Region Emma Mitchell League 11 clubs	Erin Cuthbert League 11 clubs	Erin Cuthbert League 10 clubs Lee Alexander League 11 clubs
South East	Cross Region Jenna Fife League 6 clubs Kirsty Smith League 8 clubs	Joelle Murray League 9 clubs Lizzie Arnot League 10 clubs	Frankie Brown League 12 clubs Joelle Murray League 10 clubs Lizzie Arnot League 10 clubs
East	Cross Region Jenna Fife League 6 clubs Kirsty Smith League 8 clubs	Caroline Weir League 11 clubs Abbi Grant League 8 clubs	Lucy Graham League 9 clubs Caroline Weir League 9 clubs Lana Clelland League 5 clubs
North	Kim Little League 8 clubs	Kim Little League 13 clubs	Rachel Corsie League 7 clubs Christy Grimshaw League 7 clubs Rachel McLauchlan League 6 clubs

==== Cup competitions ====
The Scottish Women's Cup is open to all senior teams affiliated with Scottish Women's Football. There are also the Scottish Women's Football League Cup, Scottish Women's Football League Plate, Scottish Women's Championship Cup, and Highlands & Islands League Cup. The SSFA run national school competitions for girls teams at U14 (7 a-side), U15 and U18 ages. Current holders are Forfar Academy (U14 7-aside), Braidhurst HS (U15) and Wallace HS (U18). SSFA Regional Select holders are Lanarkshire at U15 and Ayrshire at U18. .

== See also ==
- List of association football competitions
- List of football clubs in Scotland
