= Football in Scotland =

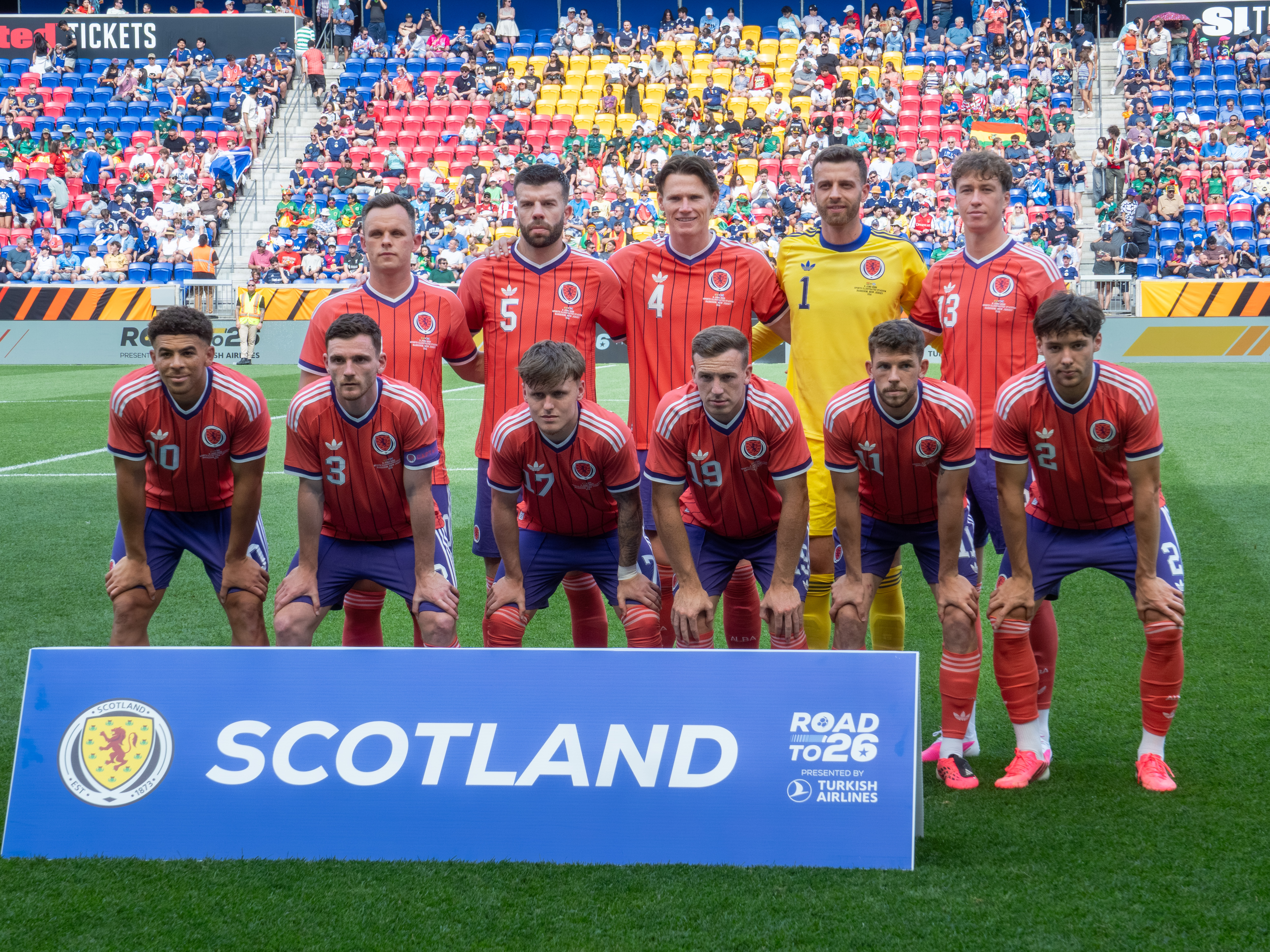
- The national team line up in a warm–up match ahead of 2026 FIFA World Cup
- Country: Scotland
- Governing body: Scottish Football Association
- National teams: Men's national team Women's national team
- First played: 1873; 153 years ago
- Registered players: 470,000
- Clubs: Over 1,000 42 SPFL clubs 283 within the Scottish Football Pyramid

National competitions
- Scottish Cup; Scottish Women's Cup; Scottish League Cup; Scottish Women's Premier League Cup; Scottish Challenge Cup

Club competitions
- Scottish Premiership; Scottish Women's Premier League; Scottish Championship; Scottish Women's Football Championship; Scottish League One; Scottish League Two

International competitions
- Champions League; Women's Champions League; Europa League; Conference League; Super Cup; FIFA Club World Cup; FIFA Intercontinental Cup; FIFA World Cup (National Team); European Championship (National Team); UEFA Nations League (National Team)

Association football (Scots: fitba) is one of the national sports of Scotland and the most popular sport in the country. There is a long tradition of "football" games in Orkney, Lewis and southern Scotland, especially the Scottish Borders, although many of these include carrying the ball and passing by hand, and despite bearing the name "football" bear little resemblance to association football. Founded in 1873, Scotland has the second oldest national Football Association in the world (behind England's FA), and has various professional and amateur levels. The national cup, the Scottish Cup, is the second oldest football cup competition (after the FA Cup), and its trophy is the oldest national sporting trophy in the world. Scotland and Scottish football clubs hold many records for football attendances.

There has been debate as to whether Scotland is the traditional home of football, rather than England. The first international association football match was played in Glasgow, and resulted in a 0–0 draw between Scotland and England. In respect of Scotland's footballing history, it is one of only four permanent members of the International Football Association Board (IFAB) which governs the Laws of the Game. The earliest record of football in Scotland dates from 1424 in an act of the Parliament of Scotland, whereby the King of Scotland, James I prohibited men from "playing at the football". However the first reference to football in England dates back to 1314.

The national team plays home matches at Hampden Park in Glasgow, and has appeared in nine FIFA World Cup competitions (the most recent was in 2026) and four appearances at the UEFA European Championship (the most recent in 2024). Scotland also competes in the UEFA Nations League, and was in Group A for the 2024–25 instalment. In the 2026–27 tournament, Scotland will compete in Group B.

In 2025, the Scottish Premiership had the highest attendance per capita of any top-flight European football league for the third year in a row. The Scottish Football Association estimate over 470,000 registered players in football across the country.

== Origins ==
A game known as "football" was played in Scotland as early as the 15th century. It was prohibited by the Football Act 1424, as it distracted men from their martial duties, and although the law fell into disuse, it was not repealed until 1906. The sport was played by commoners and royalty, such as King James VI and Mary, Queen of Scots, alike. In Perth, apprentices progressing to become master craftsmen in the 16th century had to pay for a banquet and a game of football.

There is evidence for schoolboys playing a "football" ball game in Aberdeen in 1633 (some references cite 1636) which is notable as an early allusion to what some have considered to be passing the ball. In the 1700s, Football was known to cause riots and severe damage to both property and players. Football in general had almost an ill repute. Football was mainly played during times of festival like New Years Day or Fastern's E'en. During these events, football was a "mass participant, low regulation event". There were also separate matches for men and women. Association Football's use as a leisure sport started in the 1840s as working schedules started to shift with the introduction of the half day work schedule on Saturdays. This search for "rational recreation" was brought upon by the temperance movement along with city municipal and philanthropic projects. By the late 1800s, Association Football was one of the major cultural activities among the male population of Western Scotland, both as player and as spectator. Railways helped with accessibility for travel to games in other cities, making a professional league viable. Of the thirty seven football grounds in existence in 1887, twenty of them were within one hundred yards of a railway station.

It is clear that the game was rough and tackles allowed included the "charging" and pushing/holding of opposing players ("drive that man back" in the original translation, "repelle eum" in original Latin). It has been suggested that this game bears similarities to rugby football. Contrary to media reports in 2006 there is no reference to forward passing, game rules, marking players or team formation. These reports described it as "an amazing new discovery" but has actually been well documented in football history literature since the early twentieth century and available on the internet since at least 2000.

== Scottish Football Association ==
The Scottish Football Association (SFA) is the principal organising body for Scottish football. Members of the SFA include clubs in Scotland, affiliated national associations as well as local associations. It was formed in March 1873, making it the World's second oldest national football association. The founding clubs were Queen's Park, Clydesdale, Vale of Leven, Dumbreck, Third Lanark, Eastern, Granville, and Kilmarnock.

The SFA is responsible for the operation of the Scotland national football team, the annual Scottish Cup and several other duties important to the functioning of the game in Scotland.

== Cup competitions ==
=== Scottish Cup ===
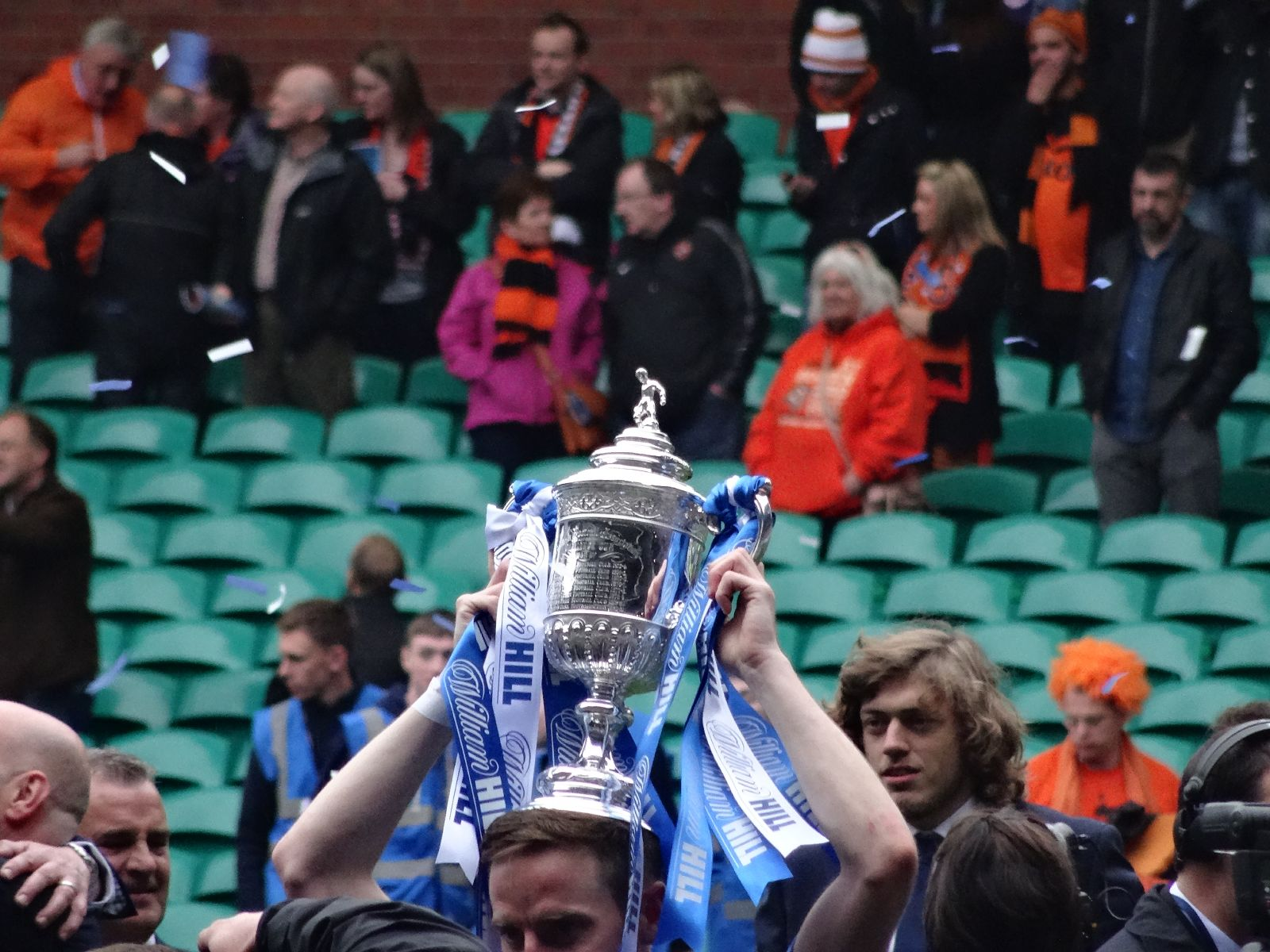
The Scottish Cup is the world's oldest national cup.

The Scottish Cup is the world's oldest national cup but not the oldest competition, first contested in 1873 and being predated only by England's FA Cup. It is a pure knockout tournament with single matches, with replays being held if the first match is a tie. All 42 SPFL clubs automatically enter the tournament. A number of non-league clubs used to participate by virtue of having qualified through one of two regionalised qualifying cups (since 2007–08 they have qualified automatically for the First Round); or since 2007–08 by having won the Scottish Junior Cup or one of the three regionalised Junior leagues. The final is usually played at Hampden Park. The attendance of 146,433 for the 1937 Scottish Cup Final between Celtic and Aberdeen at Hampden Park is a European record for a club match.

=== Scottish League Cup ===
The Scottish League Cup is open to members of the SPFL and the Highland League and Lowland League champions. It has been contested since the 1946–47 season and was the first ever League Cup formed.

=== Scottish Challenge Cup ===
The Scottish Challenge Cup is open to members of the SPFL clubs contesting in the Championship, League One & League Two and the top four clubs in the Highland League and Lowland League, and has been contested since the 1990–91 season. Since 2016–17 season all 12 Premiership Development teams have taken part in the competition along with teams from the Welsh Premier League and Northern Irish Premiership, with teams from the English National League joining in 2017–18 season.

=== Scottish Junior Cup ===
The Scottish Junior Cup is contested by all members of the SJFA and has been competed for since the 1886–87 season. Currently, up to 132 teams are eligible to take part.

=== Scottish Amateur Cup ===
The Scottish Amateur Cup is the principal competition for amateur clubs, competed for since 1909–10. Currently around 600 clubs enter.

=== Current Scottish national cup eligibility summary ===
Level	League(s)	Scottish Cup	Scottish League Cup	Scottish Challenge Cup	Scottish Junior Cup	Scottish Amateur Cup
1	SPFL Premiership	Yes	Yes	No	No	No
2	SPFL Championship	Yes	Yes	Yes	No	No
3	SPFL League One	Yes	Yes	Yes	No	No
4	SPFL League Two	Yes	Yes	Yes	No	No
5	Highland League	Yes	League champions Runner-up from one league	By invitation only	No	No
5	Lowland League East	Yes	League champions Runner-up from one league	By invitation only	No	No
5	Lowland League West	Yes	League champions Runner-up from one league	By invitation only	No	No
6	Midlands League	League Champions Licensed Clubs	No		Scottish Junior FA members	No
6	North Caledonian League	League Champions Licensed Clubs	No		Scottish Junior FA members	No
6–7	North of Scotland Football League	League Champions Licensed Clubs	No		Scottish Junior FA members	No
6–9	East of Scotland League	League Champions Licensed Clubs Cup Winners' Shield holders	No		Scottish Junior FA members	No
6	South of Scotland League	League Champions Licensed Clubs Cup Winners' Shield holders	No		Scottish Junior FA members	No
6–10	West of Scotland League	League Champions Licensed Clubs Cup Winners' Shield holders	No		Scottish Junior FA members	No
	Scottish Amateur FA	Scottish Amateur Cup winners	No		No	Yes
	Additional participants	Scottish Junior Cup winners		12 x Premiership U21 teams		
Total clubs (2026–27)		126	45	53	108	

== European competitions ==
Three Scottish clubs have won UEFA competitions. Celtic won the 1967 European Cup Final, then lost the 1970 European Cup Final. The highest ever attendance for a UEFA competition match was in the 1969–70 European Cup semi-final at Hampden Park, Scotland's National stadium. A record 136,505 people attended that Cup semi-final played between Celtic and Leeds United.

Rangers won the 1972 European Cup Winners' Cup final, and reached the finals of the same competition in 1961 and 1967, losing out both times. The most recent victory by a Scottish club in a European competition was when Aberdeen won the 1983 European Cup Winners' Cup final and then won the consequent 1983 European Super Cup.

No Scottish club has won the UEFA Cup / UEFA Europa League, although three have reached the final. Dundee United reached the 1987 final, and their fans won an award for their good behaviour from UEFA after their defeat to IFK Gothenburg. Celtic fans won a similar award after their team lost in extra time to FC Porto in the 2003 final. Rangers lost 2–0 to Zenit Saint Petersburg in the 2008 final. The most recent appearance by a Scottish club in a European final was when Rangers lost on penalties to Eintracht Frankfurt in the 2022 UEFA Europa League final.

== National team ==
The Scottish national team represents Scotland in international football and is controlled by the Scottish Football Association. The team has played international football longer than any other nation in the world along with England, whom they played in the world's first international football match at Hamilton Crescent, Partick, Glasgow in 1872. Scotland have qualified for eight World Cups and four European Championships, but have never progressed beyond the first round.

The majority of Scotland's home matches are played at Hampden Park in Glasgow, opened in 1903. The Scottish team have become famous for their travelling support, known as the Tartan Army, who have won awards from UEFA for their combination of vocal support, friendly nature and charity work. The attendance of 149,415 for the Scotland vs. England match of 1937 at Hampden Park is also a European record.

== League ==
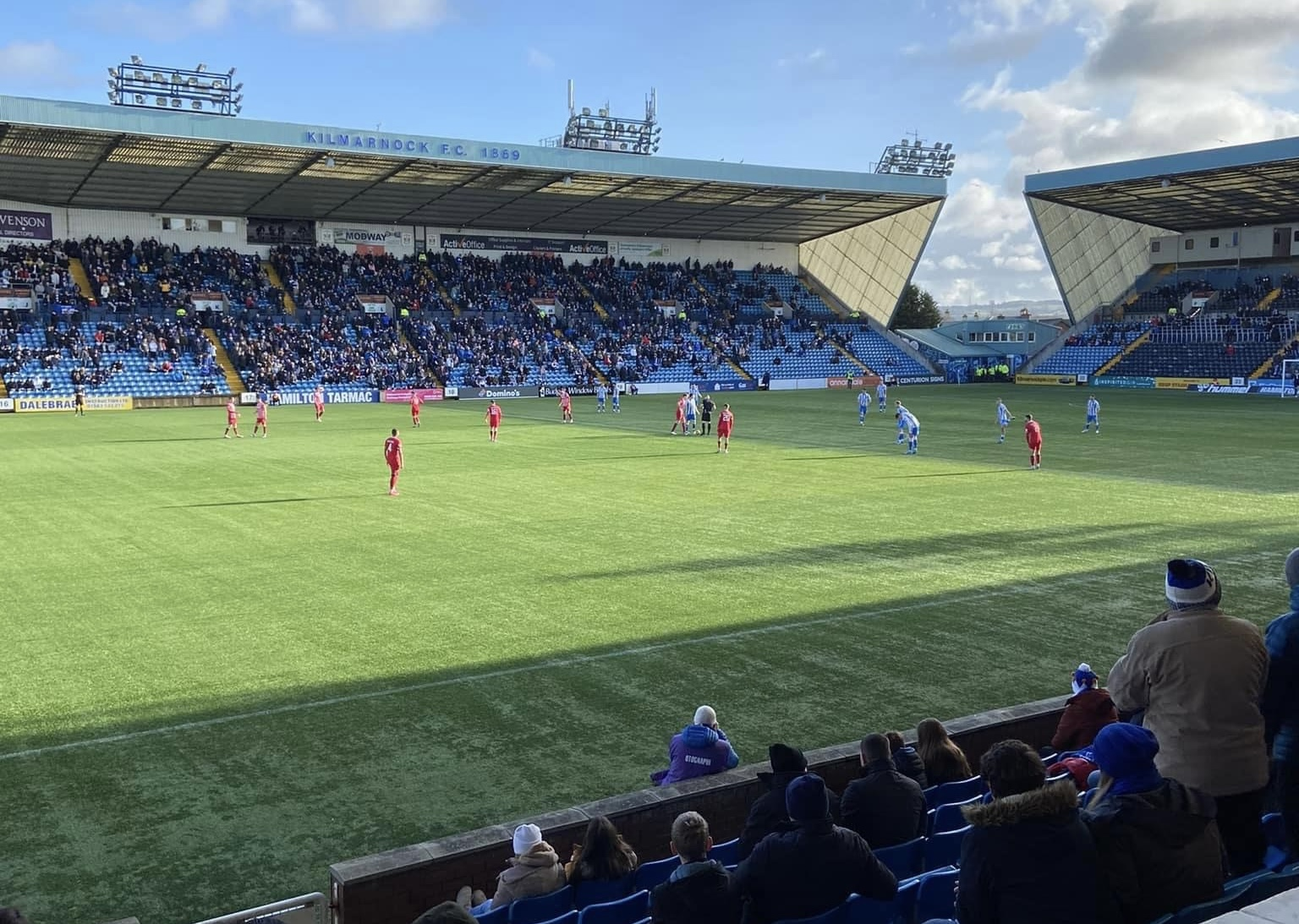
Kilmarnock v Raith Rovers in the Scottish Championship, 2021

Professional league football in Scotland is run by the Scottish Professional Football League (SPFL) comprising four tiers. The SPFL, along with the Scottish Highland Football League, Scottish Lowland Football League, East of Scotland League, South of Scotland League, West of Scotland League and the North Caledonian League were deemed to be "senior" and are administered by the Scottish Football Association. In 2014–15 season, a promotion and relegation scheme between the SPFL and the Highland and Lowland Leagues came into operation, as part of a gradual move towards building a comprehensive pyramid structure that now also incorporates the other senior leagues. Historically, "junior" clubs in the Scottish Junior Football Association (SJFA) were administered separately, however in February 2025, the SJFA acknowledged the request of teams participating in the remaining junior leagues to become autonomous within the Scottish Football Association structure, and these leagues now sit within the same structure as the former "senior" leagues as the Midlands Football League and the North of Scotland Football League. The leagues affiliated to the Scottish Amateur Football Association remain outwith the pyramid system and continue to be administered separately. In 2014–15 season, a promotion and relegation scheme between the SPFL and the Highland and Lowland Leagues came into operation, as part of a gradual move towards building a comprehensive pyramid structure.

Rangers' record attendance of 118,567 is a British record for a league match.

=== Scottish Professional Football League ===
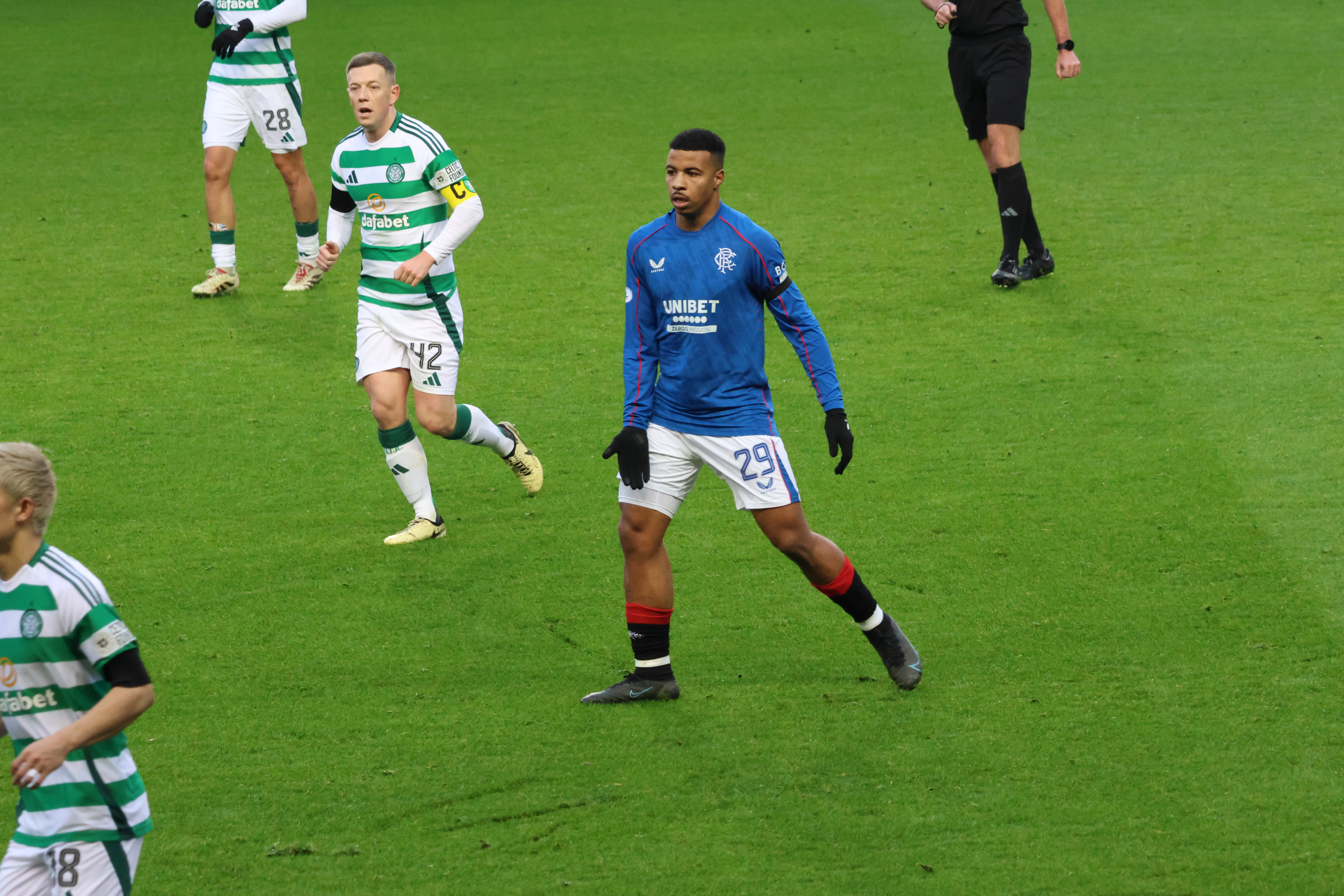
Rangers v. Celtic F.C. in 2025. Both teams originate from Glasgow, and contest the Glasgow Derby (Old Firm)

The Scottish Professional Football League is a four tier football league system consisting of 42 teams. There are 12 teams in the top tier, the Scottish Premiership, and 10 in each of the lower three tiers, named the Scottish Championship, Scottish League One and Scottish League Two.

The Scottish Premiership is the top league in Scotland, and consists of 12 teams. It has existed since 2013, when the Scottish Premier League and the Scottish Football League merged into the SPFL. The top tier of Scottish football is traditionally home to one of the world's most famous football rivalries, between Rangers and Celtic. Together the two clubs are known as the Old Firm, by virtue of the profitability of their rivalry. Rangers have won 55 Scottish league championships, which was a world record when the 55th title was won (2021) but has since been overtaken by Northern Irish club Linfield (56). Celtic, who have won 55 Scottish league championships, were the first non-Latin and first team from Great Britain to win the European Cup, in 1967. The Old Firm rivalry was interrupted in 2012, when the company running Rangers went into liquidation and the club was forced to restart in the fourth tier of Scottish Football. The rivalry was resumed in September 2016, after Rangers had been promoted into the Scottish Premiership.

The second, third and fourth tiers in the league structure are called the Scottish Championship, Scottish League One and Scottish League Two respectively, each consisting of 10 teams. Teams are relegated and promoted between the divisions. Relegation from the fourth tier may occur at the end of every season (from 2014 to 2015 thereafter); the last placed team in the fourth tier will play the winner of a play-off between the Highland and Lowland League champions. Dismissal from the fourth tier is still possible, however, if a club finishes bottom three seasons in a row. In case of dismissal or withdrawal of a team (such as for economic reasons, etc.) a senior non-League level side can be elected in its place.

The top team in the Championship is eligible for promotion to the Premiership. Since the 2013–14 season, a second promotion place is available via play-offs between 3 Championship sides and 1 Premiership side. Falkirk were refused possible entry to the top tier in 2000 and 2003 due to not meeting the stadium requirements. Previously, requirements were that clubs had to have 10,000 seats in their ground, but this was changed to 6,000. Clubs must also have under-soil heating systems to prevent cancellation of matches caused by frozen pitches.

Queen's Park, uniquely, were the only true amateur (players are not paid) member of the League still standing, having been a League member since 1900, until its membership voted to end that status in 2019.

Level	Division	Number of clubs
1	SPFL Premiership	12
2	SPFL Championship	10
3	SPFL League One	10
4	SPFL League Two	10

=== Non-league level ===
Immediately below the SPFL are two regionalised leagues:

- Highland Football League is a league of 18 clubs covering the north, north east and north west of Scotland, not just the Highlands as its name would suggest. This has been hard hit by a number of 'defections' to the Scottish Football League, though the Highland League has compensated by admitting new teams to its league in a similar way. Recent examples include Formartine United, Turriff United and Strathspey Thistle, who all joined the league in 2009.
- Lowland Football League is made up of two leagues consisting of 16 teams operating in the Scottish Lowlands; the Lowland League East (covering Angus, Tayside, Fife, Edinburgh, Lothian and the Borders), and Lowland League West (covering Glasgow and the West Coast)

At the end of the season a play-off was held between the champions of the Highland League and the Lowland League. The winner plays the bottom club in the SPFL League Two for a place in League Two in the following season.

Below these two leagues in the pyramid are:

- East of Scotland Football League, covering Fife, Edinburgh, Lothian, Perth, and the Scottish Borders, consisting of three tiers with 4 leagues.
- West of Scotland Football League, covering the west of Scotland, consisting of 5 tiers.
- North Caledonian Football League, covering the far north of Scotland, Lochaber, the Inner and Outer Hebrides, and the Islands of Orkney and Shetland.
- Midlands Football League, covering the Tayside area.
- North of Scotland Football League, covering the north-east of Scotland, consisting of two tiers.

There is no automatic promotion between these leagues and the Lowland or Highland Leagues, play-offs takes place between the champions of each of the leagues for promotion to the Lowland and Highland Leagues, subject to clubs meeting the required licensing criteria.

Level	League	Number of clubs (2025–26)
5	Highland Football League	18
5	Lowland Football League (East)	16
5	Lowland Football League (West)	17
6	North Caledonian Football League	13
6	Midlands Football League	19
6-7	North of Scotland Football League	31
6-8	East of Scotland Football League	55
6-10	West of Scotland Football League	72

Clubs at level 6 automatically enter the Scottish Cup preliminary rounds provided they are members of the Scottish Football Association.

==== Junior football ====
Historically separate from the SPFL professional leagues and the four senior leagues, were the junior leagues. Although called junior, this referred to the level of football played, not the age of the participants. The junior leagues were organised by the Scottish Junior Football Association (SJFA), and were eventually regionalised into two areas, East and North. The SJFA also organises the Scottish Junior Cup, which all members of the association participate in, having done so since the Nineteenth century. In February 2025, the SJFA acknowledged the request of teams participating in the East and North Regions to become autonomous within the Scottish Football Association structure, which would leave the organisation responsible for the Junior Cup only. The Junior Cup has subsequently been rebranded to the Scottish Communities Cup.

Junior clubs, unlike those in the senior non-league level, were not in the main eligible to participate in the Scottish Cup until 2007–08. The one previous exception to this rule, Girvan, participated in the Scottish Qualifying Cup (South) by virtue of the fact that they opted to switch from the senior level to the junior level, but still retained their right to attempt to qualify. From the 2007–08 Scottish Cup however, the winners of each of the two (previously three) regional leagues and the winner of the Junior Cup enter the first round of the Scottish Cup proper, following a decision by the SFA to allow them entry at their previous Annual General Meeting. Additional junior clubs (Banks o'Dee) have received an SFA licence which permits them to participate in the Scottish Cup.

SJFA region	Number of divisions	Number of clubs (2021–22)
Scottish Junior Football Association, East Region	1	19
Scottish Junior Football Association, North Region	3	32

=== Amateur football ===
There are a vast number of amateur footballers in Scotland. They play in leagues across the country of varying standard, usually confined to a specific localised geographic area. Many amateur clubs run teams in more than one of the amateur leagues. Some of the teams are well known with a history of success and producing players who go on to a higher level, such as Drumchapel Amateur. The activities of clubs at the amateur level are co-ordinated by the Scottish Amateur Football Association.

The winner of the Scottish Amateur Cup enters the Scottish FA Cup in the following season.

There are three categories of amateur football administered by the SAFA - "Winter" Saturday, "Winter" Sunday and Summer football. Summer football tends to be popular in the Northern and Western Isles and in the north of the mainland. In addition to the Scottish Amateur Cup (for 'Saturday' teams) there is the Scottish Sunday Amateur Trophy and the Highland Amateur Cup for summer teams.

==== Saturday Leagues (Winter) ====
Leagues	Divisions		
Aberdeenshire Amateur Football Association 60 clubs	1	Premier Division 14 clubs ↓ TBC relegation spots	
Aberdeenshire Amateur Football Association 60 clubs	2	Division One (North) 14 clubs ↑ TBC promotion spots ↓ TBC relegation spots	Division One (East) 14 clubs ↑ TBC promotion spots ↓ TBC relegation spots
Aberdeenshire Amateur Football Association 60 clubs	3	Division Two (North) 9 clubs ↑ TBC promotion spots	Division Two (East) 9 clubs ↑ TBC promotion spots
Ayrshire Amateur Football Association 37 clubs	1	Premier League 12 clubs ↓ 2 relegation spots	
Ayrshire Amateur Football Association 37 clubs	2	Division 1 11 clubs ↑ 2 promotion spots ↓ 2 relegation spots	
Ayrshire Amateur Football Association 37 clubs	3	Division 2 14 clubs ↑ 2 promotion spots	
Border Amateur Football League 28 clubs	1	A League 13 clubs ↓ 2 relegation spots + 1 relegation playoff spot	
Border Amateur Football League 28 clubs	2	B League 14 Clubs ↑ 2 promotion spots + 1 promotion playoff spot	
Caledonian Amateur Football League 23 clubs	1	Premier Division 14 clubs ↓ 3 relegation spots	
Caledonian Amateur Football League 23 clubs	2	First Division 9 clubs ↑ 3 promotion spots	
Central Scottish Amateur Football League 25 clubs	1	Premier Division 12 clubs ↓ 2 relegation spots	
Central Scottish Amateur Football League 25 clubs	2	Championship 13 clubs ↑ 2 promotion spots	
Greater Glasgow Premier Amateur Football League 41 clubs	1	Division 1 12 clubs ↓ 2 relegation spots + 1 relegation playoff spot	
Greater Glasgow Premier Amateur Football League 41 clubs	2	Division 2 12 clubs ↑ 2 promotion spots + 1 promotion playoff spot ↓ 2 relegation spots + 1 relegation playoff spot	
Greater Glasgow Premier Amateur Football League 41 clubs	3	Division 3A 9 clubs ↑ 1 promotion spots+ 1 promotion playoff spot	Division 3B 8 clubs ↑ 1 promotion spots+ 1 promotion playoff spot
Kingdom of Fife Amateur Football Association 28 clubs	1	Premier League 10 clubs ↓ 2 relegation spots	
Kingdom of Fife Amateur Football Association 28 clubs	2	Championship 9 clubs ↑ 2 promotion spots ↓ 2 relegation spots	
Kingdom of Fife Amateur Football Association 28 clubs	3	Conference 9 clubs ↑ 2 promotion spots	
Lothian & Edinburgh Amateur Football Association (Saturday) 49 clubs	1	Premier Division 12 clubs ↓ TBC relegation spot	
Lothian & Edinburgh Amateur Football Association (Saturday) 49 clubs	2	Championship 12 clubs ↑ TBC promotion spot ↓ TBC relegation spots	
Lothian & Edinburgh Amateur Football Association (Saturday) 49 clubs	3	Division 1 12 clubs ↑ TBC promotion spot ↓ TBC relegation spot	
Lothian & Edinburgh Amateur Football Association (Saturday) 49 clubs	2	Division 2 13 clubs ↑ TBC promotion spot	
Midlands Amateur Football Association 14 clubs	1	Premier Division 14 clubs	
Perthshire Amateur Football Association 21 clubs	1	Division One 10 clubs ↓ 2 relegation spots	
Perthshire Amateur Football Association 21 clubs	2	Division Two 11 clubs ↑ 2 promotion spots	
Scottish Amateur Football League 16 clubs	1	Premier 16 clubs	
Stirling & District Amateur Football Association 11 clubs	1	Premier Division 11 clubs ↓ TBC relegation spots	
Dundee Saturday Morning Amateur Football League 39 clubs	1	Premier Division 12 clubs ↓ 1 relegation spot + 2 relegation playoff spots	
Dundee Saturday Morning Amateur Football League 39 clubs	2	1st Division 12 clubs ↑ 1 promotion spot + 2 promotion playoff spots ↓ 2 relegation spots + 1 relegation playoff spot	
Dundee Saturday Morning Amateur Football League 39 clubs	3	2nd Division 15 clubs ↑ 1 promotion spot + 2 promotion playoff spots	
Glasgow Colleges Amateur Football Association 34 clubs	1	Premier Division 14 clubs ↓ 2 relegation spots	
Glasgow Colleges Amateur Football Association 34 clubs	2	Division One (A) 10 clubs ↑ 1 promotion spot	Division One (B) 10 clubs ↑ 1 promotion spot
Saturday Morning Amateur Football League 64 clubs	1	Premier Division 14 clubs ↓ TBC relegation spots	
Saturday Morning Amateur Football League 64 clubs	2	Championship 14 clubs ↑ TBC promotion spots ↓ TBC relegation spots	
Saturday Morning Amateur Football League 64 clubs	2	Division 1A 14 clubs ↑ TBC promotion spots	Division 1B 12 clubs ↑ TBC promotion spots
Strathclyde Evangelical Churches Football League 22 clubs	1	Premier Division 12 clubs ↓ 1 relegation spot	
Strathclyde Evangelical Churches Football League 22 clubs	2	Division 1 10 clubs ↑ 1 promotion spot	

==== Saturday Leagues (Summer) ====
Leagues	Divisions	
Caithness Amateur Football Association 14 clubs	1	Division 1 8 clubs ↓ 1 relegation spot
Caithness Amateur Football Association 14 clubs	2	Division 2 6 clubs ↑ 1 promotion spot
Inverness & District Amateur Football Association 26 clubs	1	Premier Division 8 clubs ↓ 1 relegation spot
Inverness & District Amateur Football Association 26 clubs	2	1st Division 8 clubs ↑ 1 promotion spot ↓ 1 relegation spot
Inverness & District Amateur Football Association 26 clubs	3	2nd Division 10 clubs ↑ 1 promotion spot
Lewis & Harris Amateur League 9 clubs	1	9 clubs
North West Sutherland Amateur Football League 8 clubs	1	8 clubs
Orkney Amateur Football Association 12 clubs	1	A League 7 clubs ↓ 1 relegation spot
Orkney Amateur Football Association 12 clubs	2	B League 5 clubs ↑ 1 promotion spot
Shetland Amateur Football Association 8 clubs	1	Premier League 8 clubs
West Highland Amateur Football Association 7 clubs	1	7 clubs
Uist & Barra Amateur Football Association 6 clubs	1	6 clubs

==== Sunday Leagues ====
Leagues	Divisions		
Aberdeen Sunday Football Association 17 clubs	1	Premier Division 8 clubs ↓ TBC relegation spots	
Aberdeen Sunday Football Association 17 clubs	2	First Division 9 clubs ↑ TBC promotion spots	
Airdrie & Coatbridge Sunday Amateur Football League 40 clubs	1	Premier Division 12 clubs ↓ TBC relegation spots	
Airdrie & Coatbridge Sunday Amateur Football League 40 clubs	2	Championship Division 13 clubs ↑ TBC promotion spots ↓ TBC relegation spots	
Airdrie & Coatbridge Sunday Amateur Football League 40 clubs	3	First Division 15 clubs ↑ TBC promotion spots	
Angus & Mearns Amateur Football Association 7 clubs	1	Division 1 7 clubs	
Ayrshire Sunday Amateur Football Association 11 clubs	1	Division 1 11 clubs	
Dumfries Sunday Amateur Football League 14 clubs	1	Premier Division 15 clubs	
Fife Sunday Amateur Football League 16 clubs	1	Premier Division 6 clubs ↓ 1 relegation spot	
Fife Sunday Amateur Football League 16 clubs	2	Championship 10 clubs ↑ 2 promotion spots	
Glasgow & District Sunday Championship Amateur Football League 43 clubs	1	Premiership 10 clubs ↓ TBC relegation spots	
Glasgow & District Sunday Championship Amateur Football League 43 clubs	2	Championship 12 clubs ↑ TBC promotion spots ↓ TBC relegation spots	
Glasgow & District Sunday Championship Amateur Football League 43 clubs	3	Division 1 11 clubs ↑ TBC promotion spots ↓ TBC relegation spots	
Glasgow & District Sunday Championship Amateur Football League 43 clubs	4	Division 2 10 clubs ↓ TBC relegation spots	
Lothians & Edinburgh Amateur Football Association (Sunday) 49 clubs		Mornings	Afternoons
Lothians & Edinburgh Amateur Football Association (Sunday) 49 clubs	1	Premier Division 10 clubs ↓ TBC relegation spots	Premier Division 14 clubs
Lothians & Edinburgh Amateur Football Association (Sunday) 49 clubs	2	Championship 11 clubs ↑ TBC promotion spots ↓ TBC relegation spots	
Lothians & Edinburgh Amateur Football Association (Sunday) 49 clubs	3	Division 1 14 clubs ↑ TBC promotion spots	
Football Central Amateur Football League 54 clubs		Lanarkshire	–
Football Central Amateur Football League 54 clubs	1	Premier Division 10 clubs ↓ TBC relegation spots	Premier Division 12 clubs ↓ TBC relegation spots
Football Central Amateur Football League 54 clubs	2	Championship 9 clubs ↑ TBC promotion spots	Championship 12 clubs ↑ TBC promotion spots ↓ TBC relegation spots
Football Central Amateur Football League 54 clubs	3		First Division 11 clubs ↑ TBC promotion spots

== Seasons ==
The following articles detail the major results and events in each season since 1871–72. Each article provides the final league tables for that season, with the exception of the current one, as well as details on cup results, Scotland national football team results and a summary of any other important events during the season.

1870s		1871–72	1872–73	1873–74	1874–75	1875–76	1876–77	1877–78	1878–79	1879–80
1880s	1880–81	1881–82	1882–83	1883–84	1884–85	1885–86	1886–87	1887–88	1888–89	1889–90
1890s	1890–91	1891–92	1892–93	1893–94	1894–95	1895–96	1896–97	1897–98	1898–99	1899–1900
1900s	1900–01	1901–02	1902–03	1903–04	1904–05	1905–06	1906–07	1907–08	1908–09	1909–10
1910s	1910–11	1911–12	1912–13	1913–14	1914–15	1915–16	1916–17	1917–18	1918–19	1919–20
1920s	1920–21	1921–22	1922–23	1923–24	1924–25	1925–26	1926–27	1927–28	1928–29	1929–30
1930s	1930–31	1931–32	1932–33	1933–34	1934–35	1935–36	1936–37	1937–38	1938–39	1939–40
1940s	1940–41	1941–42	1942–43	1943–44	1944–45	1945–46	1946–47	1947–48	1948–49	1949–50
1950s	1950–51	1951–52	1952–53	1953–54	1954–55	1955–56	1956–57	1957–58	1958–59	1959–60
1960s	1960–61	1961–62	1962–63	1963–64	1964–65	1965–66	1966–67	1967–68	1968–69	1969–70
1970s	1970–71	1971–72	1972–73	1973–74	1974–75	1975–76	1976–77	1977–78	1978–79	1979–80
1980s	1980–81	1981–82	1982–83	1983–84	1984–85	1985–86	1986–87	1987–88	1988–89	1989–90
1990s	1990–91	1991–92	1992–93	1993–94	1994–95	1995–96	1996–97	1997–98	1998–99	1999–2000
2000s	2000–01	2001–02	2002–03	2003–04	2004–05	2005–06	2006–07	2007–08	2008–09	2009–10
2010s	2010–11	2011–12	2012–13	2013–14	2014–15	2015–16	2016–17	2017–18	2018–19	2019–20
2020s	2020–21	2021–22	2022–23	2023–24	2024–25	2025–26	2026–27	2027–28	2028–29	2029–30

== Attendances ==
The average attendance per top-flight football league season and the club with the highest average attendance:

Season	League average	Highest attended club	Club average
2024–25	17,315	Celtic	58,894
2023–24	16,458	Celtic	58,827
2022–23	16,782	Celtic	58,743
2021–22	—	—	—
2020–21	—	—	—
2019–20	15,315	Celtic	57,944
2018–19	15,990	Celtic	57,778
2017–18	15,929	Celtic	57,523
2016–17	14,001	Celtic	54,726
2015–16	9,655	Celtic	44,850
2014–15	8,659	Celtic	44,585
2013–14	10,228	Celtic	47,079
2012–13	10,022	Celtic	46,917
2011–12	13,865	Celtic	50,904
2010–11	13,670	Celtic	48,978
2009–10	13,944	Rangers	47,301
2008–09	15,538	Celtic	57,671
2007–08	15,580	Celtic	56,677
2006–07	16,194	Celtic	57,928
2005–06	16,174	Celtic	58,150
2004–05	15,659	Celtic	57,943
2003–04	15,226	Celtic	58,181
2002–03	15,541	Celtic	57,243
2001–02	16,001	Celtic	58,587
2000–01	15,724	Celtic	59,165
1999–2000	17,902	Celtic	53,885
1998–99	18,534	Celtic	59,279
1997–98	17,997	Rangers	49,357
1996–97	17,198	Rangers	48,122
1995–96	14,755	Rangers	44,661
1994–95	14,155	Rangers	44,062
1993–94	12,352	Rangers	43,345
1992–93	11,376	Rangers	40,737
1991–92	11,785	Rangers	37,705
1990–91	14,424	Rangers	35,969
1989–90	15,576	Rangers	38,431
1988–89	15,709	Rangers	39,189
1987–88	13,949	Rangers	38,568
1986–87	11,721	Rangers	36,152
1985–86	12,558	Celtic	25,335
1984–85	10,832	Rangers	20,963
1983–84	11,143	Rangers	21,996
1982–83	10,318	Celtic	23,740
1981–82	9,467	Celtic	22,718
1980–81	9,777	Celtic	22,836
1979–80	12,348	Celtic	28,499
1978–79	12,916	Rangers	25,628
1977–78	13,091	Celtic	29,568
1976–77	11,844	Celtic	28,063
1975–76	13,460	Rangers	30,648
1974–75	8,735	Rangers	32,855
1973–74	8,015	Celtic	24,762
1972–73	9,199	Rangers	27,469
1971–72	10,273	Celtic	31,241
1970–71	9,506	Celtic	29,647
1969–70	10,586	Celtic	35,411
1968–69	10,125	Celtic	34,740
1967–68	9,436	Rangers	34,980
1966–67	9,348	Celtic	31,082
1965–66	8,795	Rangers	24,441
1964–65	9,580	Rangers	29,089
1963–64	9,767	Rangers	30,659
1962–63	9,966	Rangers	30,685
1961–62	11,145	Rangers	35,917
1960–61	13,322	Rangers	35,596
1959–60	12,695	Rangers	31,501
1958–59	12,613	Rangers	35,353
1957–58	13,009	Rangers	30,765
1956–57	13,757	Rangers	35,888
1955–56	14,150	Rangers	36,294
1954–55	16,906	Rangers	34,120
1953–54	16,228	Rangers	30,467
1952–53	17,785	Rangers	40,667
1951–52	17,412	Rangers	34,867
1950–51	18,261	Rangers	35,933
1949–50	19,865	Rangers	44,933
1948–49	20,323	Rangers	44,600
1947–48	16,858	Rangers	28,400
1946–47	14,831	Rangers	28,467
1938–39	9,931	Rangers	23,158
1937–38	9,727	Rangers	21,579
1936–37	9,311	Rangers	20,253
1935–36	8,767	Heart of Midlothian	18,362
1934–35	8,777	Rangers	19,526
1933–34	7,606	Rangers	16,895
1932–33	7,287	Rangers	16,632
1931–32	8,326	Rangers	20,368
1930–31	8,688	Rangers	20,814
1929–30	8,468	Rangers	21,579
1928–29	8,360	Rangers	19,737
1927–28	8,303	Rangers	21,263
1926–27	8,955	Rangers	17,579
1925–26	9,611	Heart of Midlothian	18,368
1924–25	9,729	Heart of Midlothian	17,815
1923–24	8,710	Heart of Midlothian	16,263
1922–23	9,821	Rangers	22,632
1921–22	9,910	Rangers	23,857
1920–21	9,856	Rangers	23,489
1919–20	9,217	Rangers	21,381
1918–19	8,072	Rangers	21,118
1917–18	6,824	Celtic	15,059
1916–17	5,329	Rangers	12,526
1915–16	5,650	Rangers	12,221
1914–15	6,589	Rangers	14,947
1913–14	8,983	Rangers	21,395
1912–13	8,335	Rangers	21,471
1911–12	8,013	Rangers	20,529
1910–11	7,264	Rangers	16,147
1909–10	6,543	Rangers	14,471
1908–09	6,527	Rangers	16,706
1907–08	6,552	Celtic	13,618
1906–07	5,727	Celtic	13,118
1905–06	5,899	Rangers	10,500

== Women's football ==
As in the men's game, the women's league structure consists of a Premier League and a Football League with Divisions One and Two, but the second division is split into North, West, and Central & East regions. In the women's SFL, reserve and youth squads may compete as long as they do not compete in the same division as the titular club. There are also four cup competitions, the Scottish Cup, Scottish Premier League Cup, Scottish First Division Cup and the Scottish Second Division Cup.

== See also ==
- Tartan Army
- Sport in Scotland
- Scottish youth football system
- List of defunct football leagues in Scotland
- Football in the United Kingdom

== Bibliography ==
- Brogan, Tom. We Made Them Angry: Scotland at the World Cup Spain 1982.
- Bleasdale, John. Scotland's Swedish Adventure: The Story of Scotland's European Championship Debut.
- Doherty, Neil. World Cup 1998: Scotland's Story.
