= North East Scotland =

North East Scotland or North Eastern Scotland may refer to the following areas of Scotland in the United Kingdom:

- North East Scotland (Scottish Parliament electoral region)
- North East Scotland (European Parliament constituency), a former constituency
- North Eastern Scotland, a ITL 2 statistical region, see International Territorial Level

== See also ==
- Lists of regions of Scotland
- North East Scotland College
- North East Scotland Football Association
