= Orkney Parish Cup =

Parish Cup
- Organiser(s): OAFA
- Founded: 1929
- Teams: 15
- Current champions: Westray

The Orkney Parish Cup is a unique football competition whereby birth and residence in the Scottish island of Orkney determine eligibility to play for a team. It is an annual competition with the final usually played on the second Saturday in August.

== Format ==
The competition is a knock-out tournament with both teams playing each other home and away, with the aggregate score deciding the winner.

== History ==
The first year of the competition was 1929 with the only gaps being for World War II (1940–1945) and COVID-19 (2020).

== Performances ==
Results by Parish
Parish	Wins	First final won	Last final won	Runners-up	Last final lost	Total final appearances
Birsay	4	1970	2018	9	2013	13
Deerness	4	1930	1935	3	1938	7
Firth	2	1931	1992	5	1997	7
Harray	11	1939	1972	10	1976	21
Holm	8	1929	2025	6	2015	14
Orphir	0	-	-	6	1991	6
Rendall	0	-	-	2	2017	2
Sanday	0	-	-	2	2019	2
Sandwick	23	1973	2012	8	2025	31
Shapinsay	5	1933	1954	3	1952	8
South Ronaldsay	0	-	-	8	2014	8
St Andrews	8	1952	2006	2	2018	10
St Ola	14	1947	2014	15	2024	29
Stenness	1	1936	1936	2	2023	3
Stromness	6	1980	2019	3	2021	9
Westray	4	1991	2023	6	2022	10
