= Stirling & District Amateur Football Association =

- Founded: 1947
- Country: Scotland
- Confederation: UEFA
- Divisions: 2
- Number of clubs: 20
- Level on pyramid: N/A
- Promotion to: None
- Relegation to: None
- Domestic cup(s): Scottish Amateur Cup; East of Scotland Cup; West of Scotland Cup
- Current champions: Bonnybridge YFP

The Stirling & District Amateur Football Association (SDAFA) is a football (soccer) league comamateurpetition, primarily for amateur clubs in the Stirlingshire area of Scotland. It was formed in 1947. The association is affiliated to the Scottish Amateur Football Association.

== League Officials ==
League officers and committee

Role	Name
Chairman	(Scotland) John Alexander
Vice-Chairman	(Scotland) Gerald Moore
Secretary	(Scotland) Gordon Japp
Registration Secretary	(Scotland) Robert Ross
Match Secretary	(Scotland) Alan Upton
Treasurer	(Scotland) Robert Torrance

== Member clubs ==
As of the 2017–18 season, the Stirling & District AFA had 45 member clubs:

=== Premier Division ===
- Barrhill AFC
- Bonnybridge YFP
- Bo'ness Cadora
- Callander Thistle
- Grangemouth Rovers
- Greenhill AFC
- Linlithgow Rose CFC
- Polmont Community
- Slamannan AFC
- Stirling University AFC

=== Division One A ===
- Beechwood Albion
- Central Albion
- Denny AFA
- Doune Castle
- Glenvale
- Kincardine
- Loganlea United
- Maddiston AFC
- Pennies
- Stirling Colts
- Tillicoultry AFC

=== Division One B ===
- Camelon Albion
- Campsie FC
- Clackmannan Community
- Condorrat AFC
- Drumpellier Thistle
- Fallin
- MLS Leeds
- Riverside AFC
- Stirling Boys Club
- Syngenta
- Tullibody Community
- Westfield Colts

=== Division Two ===
- AFC Carbrain
- AFC Chryston
- Carronshore Athletic
- Dollar Glen
- Dunblane Soccer Club
- Forth Thistle
- Gormac Thistle
- Greentree
- Harestanes United
- Lauriston Amateurs
- Mill Inn
- Stirling Amateurs

== League structure ==
The Stirling & District AFA is split into four divisions, a Premier Division of 12 teams, Division One which contains 11 teams and the bottom two tiers, Division Two & Three which both contain 14 clubs respectively. Each league has two clubs which are automatically promoted/relegated between divisions with the exception of Division Three, from which there is no relegation. As a stand-alone Association and not part of Scotland's pyramid system, the Premier Division does not act as a feeder league and as such there is currently no promotion available.

The league setup for season 2017-18:

Level	League(s)/Division(s)
1	Stirling & District AFA Premier Division; 12 clubs playing 22 games
2	Stirling & District AFA Division One; 11 clubs playing 20 games
3	Stirling & District AFA Division Two; 14 clubs playing 26 games
4	Stirling & District AFA Division Three; 14 clubs playing 26 games

== Cup Competitions ==
As well as the league, the association administers three cup competitions for teams in membership: the David McKinnon Memorial Trophy, the Mathieson Challenge Trophy & the JF Colley Cup. Additionally, each division compete in a pre-season League Cup to supplement their round-robin campaign.

=== National and District Cups ===
In addition, member clubs are also likely to play in the Scottish Amateur Cup and one of the two district cups (East or West). Below are teams who have won these trophies, whilst playing in the Stirling & District AFA.

==== Scottish Amateur Cup ====
- 1967–68 Cambusbarron Rovers
- 1968–69 Cambusbarron Rovers
- 1977–78 Cambusbarron Rovers

==== West of Scotland Amateur Cup ====
- 1980–81 Cambusbarron Rovers
- 1982–83 Bannockburn AFC

==== East of Scotland Amateur Cup ====
- 1960–61 Grangemouth Refinery AFC
- 1970–71 Cambusbarron Rovers
- 1979–80 Windsor AFC
- 1982–83 Milton AFC
- 1990–91 Fallin M.W.
- 1994–95 Fallin M.W.
- 1997–98 Fallin M.W.
- 2004–05 Falkirk AFC
- 2005–06 Stenhouse Athletic
- 2009–10 Bluebell AFC
- 2010–11 Falkirk AFC
