= Aberdeenshire Amateur Football Association =

- Founded: 1947
- Country: Scotland
- Confederation: UEFA
- Divisions: 5
- Number of clubs: 60
- Promotion to: None
- Relegation to: None
- Domestic cup(s): Scottish Amateur Cup; North of Scotland Amateur Cup; Aberdeen F.C. Trophy
- Website: aberdeenshireafa.com

The Aberdeenshire Amateur Football Association (AAFA) is the governing body for amateur football in the City of Aberdeen and County of Aberdeenshire in North East Scotland. They run the Aberdeenshire Amateur Football League and associated cup competitions. The association was founded in 1947 and is affiliated to the Scottish Amateur Football Association.

== Member clubs ==
As of season 2023-24, the AAFA have sixty member clubs.

=== Premier Division ===
- Alford
- Bervie Caledonian
- Cove Thistle
- Cowie Thistle
- Echt
- Insch
- Kaimhill United
- Kemnay Amateurs
- Kincorth
- Nicolls Amateurs
- St Laurence
- Tarves
- Westdyke
- Woodside

=== Division One (North) ===
- AC Mill Inn
- Auchnagatt Barons
- Banchory Amateurs
- Beacon Rangers
- BSFC
- Burghmuir
- Cammachmore
- Kintore
- Ellon Thistle
- Great Western United
- JS XI
- Lads Club Amateurs
- Newburgh Thistle
- Postal ALC
- University

=== Division One (East) ===
- Bon Accord City
- Bridge of Don
- Feughside
- Fyvie
- Glendale
- Glentanar Reflex
- Jesus House
- Kemnay Youth
- Rattrays XI
- St Marnans
- Stoneywood Parkvale
- Stonehaven Athletic
- Tolbooth
- Turriff Thistle

=== Division Two (North) ===
- Halliburton
- Meldrum United
- Kintore United
- Burghmuir
- Desside
- Cammachmore
- Theologians
- University Colts
- Jesus House
- Ferryhill

=== Division Two (East) ===
- AC Mill Inn Academy
- Byron Sports Club
- Ellon Amateurs
- Ferryhill
- FC Polska
- Laurencekirk West End
- Meldrum United
- Monymusk
- St Machar Thistle

== League Structure ==
The Aberdeenshire AFA is split into three single tiers - a Premier Division at the summit with two divisions below. Divisions One and Two are split into two parallel groups.

The league setup:

Level	League(s)/Division(s)
1	Aberdeenshire AFA Premier Division; 14 clubs playing 26 games
2	Aberdeenshire AFA Division One; 28 clubs in two groups playing 26 games
3	Aberdeenshire AFA Division Two; 18 clubs in two groups playing 24 games

== Associated competitions ==
=== Aberdeen F.C. Trophy ===
The equivalent of the League Cup, a knock-out competition for all member clubs.

- 1947-48 Cove Rangers
- 1948-49 Cove Rangers
- 1949-50 Cove Rangers
- 1950-51 Ellon United
- 1951-52 Cove Rangers
- 1952-53 Cove Rangers
- 1953-54 Cove Rangers
- 1954-55 Banchory
- 1955-56 Cove Rangers
- 1956-57 Cleansing Department
- 1957-58 Cove Rangers
- 1958-59 Cove Rangers
- 1959-60 Banchory
- 1960-61 Bon Accord
- 1961-62 Cove Rangers
- 1962-63 Cove Rangers
- 1963-64 Ellon United
- 1964-65 Cove Rangers
- 1965-66 Ellon United
- 1966-67 Aberdeen University
- 1967-68 Aberdeen City Police
- 1968-69 A.D. Club
- 1969-70 Aboyne
- 1970-71 Maud
- 1971-72 Culter
- 1972-73 Maud
- 1973-74 Culter
- 1974-75 Cove Rangers
- 1975-76 Culter
- 1976-77 Culter
- 1977-78 Kemnay
- 1978-79 Longside
- 1979-80 Chattan Rovers
- 1980-81 Denmore Thistle
- 1981-82 Aboyne
- 1982-83 Cove Rangers
- 1983-84 Cove Rangers
- 1984-85 Cove Rangers
- 1985-86 Culter
- 1986-87 Culter
- 1987-88 Longside
- 1988-89 Kincorth
- 1989-90 Kincorth
- 1990-91 Hermes
- 1991-92 Kincorth
- 1992-93 Kincorth
- 1993-94 Hilton
- 1994-95 Dyce
- 1995-96 Echt
- 1996-97 Hilton
- 1997-98 Echt
- 1998-99 Echt
- 1999-00 Echt
- 2000-01 Cowie Thistle
- 2001-02 Echt
- 2002-03 Walker Road
- 2003-04 Kincorth
- 2004-05 Sunnybank Amateurs
- 2005-06 Echt
- 2006-07 Stoneywood SSC
- 2007-08 Echt
- 2008-09 University
- 2009-10 Bon-Accord City
- 2010-11 Woodside
- 2011-12 Woodside
- 2012-13 Sportsmans Club
- 2013-14 Cove Thistle
- 2014-15 Rothie Rovers
- 2015-16 Ellon Amateurs
- 2016-17 Cove Thistle
- 2017-18 Cowie Thistle
- 2018-19 Tolbooth
- 2019-20 Uncompleted
- 2020-21 Uncontested
- 2021-22 Tarves
- 2022-23 Kincorth

==== Edmond Trophy ====
A consolation cup for losing teams in the first round of the Aberdeen F.C. Trophy.

- 1954-55 Fittie Rangers
- 1955-56 Millbank
- 1956-57 Rowatt
- 1957-58 Rowatt
- 1958-59 CWD Athletic
- 1959-60 No Competition
- 1960-61 No Competition
- 1961-62 No Competition
- 1962-63 No Competition
- 1963-64 CD & SSC
- 1964-65 Lads Club
- 1965-66 Kintore
- 1966-67 Kemnay
- 1967-68 Newtonhill
- 1968-69 College of Education
- 1969-70 Richard's XI
- 1970-71 Hall Russell United
- 1971-72 Marley United
- 1972-73 Stonehaven
- 1973-74 Stoneywood Amateurs
- 1974-75 Grampian Spurs
- 1975-76 Banchory St. Ternan
- 1976-77 Seaview Spurs
- 1977-78 Seaview Spurs
- 1978-79 Seaview Spurs
- 1979-80 Alford
- 1980-81 Denmore Thistle
- 1981-82 Carlton
- 1982-83 Postal
- 1983-84 Kintore
- 1984-85 No Competition
- 1985-86 No Competition
- 1986-87 Potterton
- 1987-88 Kincorth
- 1988-89 Portlethen Thistle
- 1989-90 Blackburn
- 1990-91 Hilton
- 1991-92 Cruden Bay
- 1992-93 Royal Cornhill
- 1993-94 Old Aberdonians
- 1994-95 Gramar FPs
- 1995-96 Frigate
- 1996-97 Great Western United
- 1997-98 No Competition
- 1998-99 Grammar FPs
- 1999-00 West End
- 2000-01 Grampian Police
- 2001-02 Frigate
- 2002-03 Frigate
- 2003-04 Stoneywood SSC
- 2004-05 Frigate
- 2005-06 Kincorth Rovers
- 2006-07 Westdyke
- 2007-08 Bon-Accord City
- 2008-09 Cowie Thistle
- 2009-10 Cowie Thistle
- 2010-11 Kincorth
- 2011-12 Cove Thistle
- 2012-13 Woodside
- 2013-14 Cowie Thistle
- 2014-15 Westhill
- 2015-16 West End
- 2016-17 Tolbooth
- 2017-18 Newtonhill
- 2018-19 Kaimhill United
- 2019-20 Uncompleted
- 2020-21 Uncontested
- 2021-22 Uncontested
- 2022-23 Cove Thistle

=== Association Trophy ===
A knock-out competition for Premier Division and Division One clubs.

- 1989-90 Kincorth
- 1990-91 Glentanar
- 1991-92 Great Western United
- 1992-93 Raeden Thistle
- 1993-94 Kincorth
- 1994-95 Hatton
- 1995-96 Glentanar
- 1996-97 FC Hayloft
- 1997-98 Echt
- 1998-99 Luthermuir
- 1999-00 Cowie Thistle
- 2000-01 Hilton
- 2001-02 Echt
- 2002-03 Walker Road
- 2003-04 Aberdeen Sporting Club
- 2004-05 Stoneywood SSC
- 2005-06 Echt
- 2006-07 Stoneywood SSC
- 2007-08 Echt
- 2008-09 Cowie Thistle
- 2009-10 Echt
- 2010-11 Cove Thistle
- 2011-12 Cove Thistle
- 2012-13 Echt
- 2013-14 Cowie Thistle
- 2014-15 Cove Thistle
- 2015-16 Ellon Amateurs
- 2016-17 Torry Amateurs
- 2017-18 Woodside
- 2018-19 Sportsman's Club
- 2019-20 Uncompleted
- 2020-21 Uncontested
- 2021-22 Echt
- 2022-23 Kemnay Amateurs

==== Bowie Cup ====
A consolation cup for losing teams in the first round of the Association Trophy.

- 1949-50 Castlehill
- 1950-51 No Competition
- 1951-52 Banchory
- 1952-53 Mugiemoss FC
- 1953-54 Banchory
- 1954-55 No Competition
- 1955-56 Formartine United
- 1956-57 University
- 1957-58 Cove Rangers
- 1958-59 Avondale
- 1959-60 Formartine United
- 1960-61 Ellon United
- 1961-62 Cove Rangers
- 1962-63 Aboyne
- 1963-64 University
- 1964-65 Cove Rangers
- 1965-66 Cove Rangers
- 1966-67 Cove Rangers
- 1967-68 Dyce Amateurs
- 1968-69 No Competition
- 1969-70 College of Education
- 1970-71 Dyce Amateurs
- 1971-72 Bon Accord
- 1972-73 Cove Thistle
- 1973-74 Chattan Rovers
- 1974-75 Aboyne
- 1975-76 Newtonhill
- 1976-77 Banchory
- 1977-78 Maryculter
- 1978-79 Commercial Thistle
- 1979-80 Commercial Thistle
- 1980-81 Aboyne
- 1981-82 Grampian Police
- 1982-83 Shamrock
- 1983-84 Marley United
- 1984-85 No Competition
- 1985-86 No Competition
- 1986-87 Banchory St Ternan
- 1987-88 Banchory St Ternan
- 1988-89 Potterton
- 1989-90 Dyce Amateurs
- 1990-91 Rattray's XI
- 1991-92 Cults
- 1992-93 Hatton
- 1993-94 Dyce
- 1994-95 Hilton
- 1995-96 FC Hayloft
- 1996-97 Glendale
- 1997-98 Braemar
- 1998-99 Beacon Rangers
- 1999-00 Inverurie FP's
- 2000-01 Kemnay Youth
- 2001-02 Nicolls XI
- 2002-03 Sunnybank Amateurs
- 2003-04 Glendale
- 2004-05 Bridge of Don
- 2005-06 Glentanar Reflex
- 2006-07 Frigate
- 2007-08 Bon-Accord City
- 2008-09 Glendale XI
- 2009-10 Dyce
- 2010-11 Stoneywood Amateurs
- 2011-12 Westdyke
- 2012-13 Lads Club Amateurs
- 2013-14 Feughside
- 2014-15 Woodside
- 2015-16 Dee Amateurs
- 2016-17 Formartine United
- 2017-18 St Laurence
- 2018-19 Newtonhill
- 2019-20 Uncompleted
- 2020-21 Uncontested
- 2021-22 Uncontested
- 2022-23 Tarves

=== Premier Trophy ===
A knock-out competition for Premier Division clubs.

- 2001-02 Kincorth
- 2002-03 Kincorth
- 2003-04 University
- 2004-05 Wilsons Amateurs
- 2005-06 Stoneywood SSC
- 2006-07 Great Western United
- 2007-08 Echt
- 2008-09 Bon Accord City
- 2009-10 Westdyke
- 2010-11 Echt
- 2011-12 Cove Thistle
- 2012-13 Woodside
- 2013-14 Cove Thistle
- 2014-15 Sportsmans Club
- 2015-16 Woodside
- 2016-17 Sportsmans Club
- 2017-18 Cove Thistle
- 2018-19 Rothie Rovers
- 2019-20 Uncompleted
- 2020-21 Uncontested
- 2021-22 Woodside
- 2022-23 Woodside

=== Stephen Shield ===
A knock-out competition for clubs in Division One (North).

- 1978-79 Tanfield Thistle
- 1979-80 Kemnay Youth
- 1980-81 Kingseat
- 1981-82 Kingseat
- 1982-83 Woodside
- 1983-84 Michelin
- 1984-85 Walker Road YC
- 1985-86 No Competition
- 1986-87 Phoenix
- 1987-88 Fintray Thistle
- 1988-89 AC Mill Inn
- 1989-90 Hilton
- 1990-91 Luthermuir
- 1991-92 Halliburton
- 1992-93 Ellon Thistle
- 1993-94 Blackthorn Short Mile
- 1994-95 University
- 1995-96 Echt
- 1996-97 Great Western United
- 1997-98 Great Western United
- 1998-99 West End
- 1999-00 Banchory
- 2000-01 Cowie Thistle
- 2001-02 Frigate
- 2002-03 Frigate
- 2003-04 Luthermuir
- 2004-05 Bridge of Don
- 2005-06 Glentanar Reflex
- 2006-07 Nicolls Amateurs
- 2007-08 Cowie Thistle
- 2008-09 Sportsmans Club
- 2009-10 Tarves
- 2010-11 Nicolls Amateurs
- 2011-12 Insch
- 2012-13 Dyce ITC Hydraulics
- 2013-14 Tarves
- 2014-15 Echt
- 2015-16 Bervie Caledonian
- 2016-17 Cove Thistle
- 2017-18 St Laurence
- 2018-19 Rattrays XI
- 2019-20 Uncompleted
- 2020-21 Uncontested
- 2021-22 Tolbooth
- 2022-23 Kaimhill United

=== White Cup ===
A knock-out competition for clubs in Division One (East).

- 1973-74 Ellon Youth
- 1974-75 Maryculter
- 1975-76 Longside
- 1976-77 Farburn
- 1977-78 Seaview Spurs
- 1978-79 Castle Rovers
- 1979-80 Aboyne
- 1980-81 Cove Thistle
- 1981-82 Aberdeen Shamrock
- 1982-83 Oxy Sporting Club
- 1983-84 Kemnay Youth
- 1984-85 Postal
- 1985-86 No Competition
- 1986-87 RAF Buchan
- 1987-88 No Competition
- 1988-89 Newburgh Thistle
- 1989-90 Phoenix
- 1990-91 Blackburn
- 1991-92 Stonehaven White Heather
- 1992-93 Echt
- 1993-94 RGU
- 1994-95 BSFC
- 1995-96 Burghmuir
- 1996-97 Continental
- 1997-98 No Competition
- 1998-99 Theologians
- 1999-00 Fintray Thistle
- 2000-01 FC Byron Munich
- 2001-02 RGU
- 2002-03 University Strollers
- 2003-04 AC Mill Inn
- 2004-05 Dyce Amateurs
- 2005-06 Stoneywood Amateurs
- 2006-07 West End
- 2007-08 Lads Club Amateurs
- 2008-09 Old Aberdonians
- 2009-10 Woodside
- 2010-11 Cove Thistle
- 2011-12 Halliburton
- 2012-13 Old Aberdonians
- 2013-14 RGU
- 2014-15 Nicolls Amateurs
- 2015-16 Dee Amateurs
- 2016-17 Stoneywood East End
- 2017-18 Insch
- 2018-19 Banchory Amateurs
- 2019-20 Uncompleted
- 2020-21 Uncontested
- 2021-22 Alford
- 2022-23 Westdyke

=== Castle Rovers Cup ===
A knock-out competition for clubs in Division Two (North).

- 1978-79 Glentanar
- 1979-80 Turriff Amateurs
- 1980-81 Parkinson's
- 1981-82 Bieldside
- 1982-83 Chattan Rovers
- 1983-84 Feughside
- 1984-85 No Competition
- 1985-86 No Competition
- 1986-87 Donside
- 1987-88 No Competition
- 1988-89 FC Hayloft
- 1989-90 Cammachmore
- 1990-91 Trophies International
- 1991-92 Hilton
- 1992-93 Luthermuir
- 1993-94 Greentrees
- 1994-95 Old Aberdonians
- 1995-96 Sheddocksley
- 1996-97 Frigate
- 1997-98 Royal Cornhill
- 1998-99 Carlton
- 1999-00 Halliburton
- 2000-01 Auchnagatt Barons
- 2001-02 Maryculter
- 2002-03 Woodbank
- 2003-04 RGU
- 2004-05 Theologians
- 2005-06 PA United
- 2006-07 Alford
- 2007-08 Stonehaven Athletic
- 2008-09 University Colts
- 2009-10 Hilton
- 2010-11 Postal ALC
- 2011-12 Ellon Thistle
- 2012-13 Northern United
- 2013-14 Granite City
- 2014-15 Westhill
- 2015-16 Newburgh Thistle
- 2016-17 Newburgh Thistle
- 2017-18 Turriff Thistle
- 2018-19 Cammachmore
- 2019-20 Uncompleted
- 2020-21 Uncontested
- 2021-22 Burghmuir
- 2022-23 Halliburton

=== Barclay Cook Cup ===
A knock-out competition for clubs in Division Two (East).

- 1964-65 Cove Rangers
- 1965-66 Cove Rangers
- 1966-67 Cove Thistle
- 1967-68 Kemnay
- 1968-69 No Competition
- 1969-70 Links Parks
- 1970-71 Grandholm
- 1971-72 Alford
- 1972-73 Ellon Youth
- 1973-74 Albion Rangers
- 1974-75 Longside
- 1975-76 Savings Bank
- 1976-77 Carlton
- 1977-78 Braemar
- 1978-79 G.S.A.
- 1979-80 Cup Withheld
- 1980-81 Kingseat
- 1981-82 Raeden Thistle
- 1982-83 Parkinson's
- 1983-84 McTeagle Taylor
- 1984-85 No Competition
- 1985-86 No Competition
- 1986-87 Rothie Rovers
- 1987-88 Feughside
- 1988-89 APG McTeagle
- 1989-90 FC Hayloft
- 1990-91 Riverside
- 1991-92 Echt
- 1992-93 RGU
- 1993-94 AC Mill Inn
- 1994-95 Theologians
- 1995-96 Theologians
- 1996-97 Cults
- 1997-98 No Competition
- 1998-99 Chattan Rovers
- 1999-00 Cults
- 2000-01 College of Education
- 2001-02 Newmachar United
- 2002-03 Newmachar United
- 2003-04 Newtonhill
- 2004-05 Postal ALC
- 2005-06 Postal ALC
- 2006-07 Blackburn
- 2007-08 Turriff Thistle
- 2008-09 Luthermuir
- 2009-10 Mearns United
- 2010-11 Westhill
- 2011-12 Hazlehead United
- 2012-13 AC Mill Inn
- 2013-14 JS XI
- 2014-15 Bridge of Don
- 2015-16 Westdyce
- 2016-17 Sheddocksley
- 2017-18 Tolbooth
- 2018-19 Colony Park
- 2019-20 Uncompleted
- 2020-21 Uncontested
- 2021-22 AC Mill Inn Academy
- 2022-23 Ellon Thistle

=== Chattan Rovers Cup ===
A knock-out competition for clubs in Division Three.

- 1974-75 Kemnay
- 1975-76 Culter
- 1976-77 Culter
- 1977-78 Grampian Spurs
- 1978-79 Dyce Amateurs
- 1979-80 Grandholm Rosslyn
- 1980-81 Longside
- 1981-82 Culter
- 1982-83 Cove Rangers
- 1983-84 Cove Rangers
- 1984-85 Crombie Sports
- 1985-86 No Competition
- 1986-87 Kincorth
- 1987-88 Braemar
- 1988-89 FC Central
- 1989-90 Theologians
- 1990-91 Albion Rangers
- 1991-92 Grampian CD
- 1992-93 Hilton
- 1993-94 Echt
- 1994-95 Deep Freeze
- 1995-96 Deep Freeze
- 1996-97 Sheddocksley
- 1997-98 Albion Rangers
- 1998-99 Bankhead
- 1999-00 Alford
- 2000-01 Trophies International
- 2001-02 Torphins
- 2002-03 Torry United
- 2003-04 Millburn
- 2004-05 Inverurie FPs
- 2005-06 Kincorth Rovers
- 2006-07 Bankhead
- 2007-08 Kemnay Youth
- 2008-09 Hilton
- 2009-10 Portlethen United
- 2010-11 Torphins
- 2011-12 Great Northern Athletic
- 2012-13 Granite City
- 2013-14 Fintray Thistle
- 2014-15 Sheddocksley
- 2015-16 Monymusk
- 2016-17 Tolbooth
- 2017-18 St Marnans

=== Dickie Trophy ===
A knock-out competition for clubs in Divisions Two and Three.

- 1968-69 Aberdeen City Police
- 1969-70 Monymusk
- 1971-72 Culter
- 1972-73 Kemnay
- 1973-74 Kemnay
- 1974-75 Culter
- 1975-76 Culter
- 1976-77 Longside
- 1977-78 Newtonhill
- 1978-79 Longside
- 1979-80 Chattan Rovers
- 1980-81 Aberdeen Shamrock
- 1981-82 Grandholm Rosslyn
- 1982-83 Longside
- 1983-84 Shamrock
- 1984-85 Hall Russell United
- 1985-86 No Competition
- 1986-87 Walker Road
- 1987-88 Potterton
- 1988-89 West End
- 1989-90 Grampian Police
- 1990-91 Glentanar
- 1991-92 Glentanar
- 1992-93 Kincorth
- 1993-94 Hatton
- 1994-95 Dyce
- 1995-96 Cove Thistle
- 1996-97 Hilton
- 1997-98 Skene
- 1998-99 University
- 1999-00 Echt
- 2000-01 University
- 2001-02 Glentanar Reflex
- 2002-03 Woodbank
- 2003-04 Cove Thistle
- 2004-05 Ferryhill
- 2005-06 Bervie Caledonian
- 2006-07 Theologians
- 2007-08 Insch
- 2008-09 Hilton
- 2009-10 Rattrays XI
- 2010-11 Rothie Rovers
- 2011-12 Hazlehead United
- 2012-13 Granite City
- 2013-14 Bankhead
- 2014-15 Sheddocksley
- 2015-16 Ellon Thistle
- 2016-17 Bridge of Don
- 2017-18 Tolbooth
- 2018-19 Kemnay Amateurs
- 2019-20 Uncompleted
- 2020-21 Uncontested
- 2021-22 AC Mill Inn Academy
- 2022-23 University

==== Hans Fyfe Trophy ====
A consolation cup for losing teams in the first round of the Dickie Trophy

- 1969-70 Kemnay
- 1970-71 Culter
- 1971-72 Kemnay
- 1972-73 Culter
- 1973-74 Cove Rangers
- 1974-75 Culter
- 1975-76 Culter
- 1976-77 Kemnay
- 1977-78 Chattan Rovers
- 1978-79 Newtonhill
- 1979-80 Chattan Rovers
- 1980-81 Culter
- 1981-82 Aberdeen Shamrock
- 1982-83 Cove Rangers
- 1983-84 Longside
- 1984-85 Crombie Sports
- 1985-86 No Competition
- 1986-87 Longside
- 1987-88 Longside
- 1988-89 Kemnay Youth
- 1989-90 University
- 1990-91 Tarves
- 1991-92 Alford
- 1992-93 Grampian CD
- 1993-94 Hilton
- 1994-95 Hayloft Pearsons
- 1995-96 Woodside
- 1996-97 Turriff Amateurs
- 1997-98 Trophies International
- 1998-99 Frigate
- 1999-00 Grampian Police
- 2000-01 Walker Road
- 2001-02 Quayside Rosebowl
- 2002-03 Turriff Thistle
- 2003-04 Johnshaven Athletic
- 2004-05 Theologians
- 2005-06 Alford
- 2006-07 Stonehaven Athletic
- 2007-08 Tarves
- 2008-09 Glendale
- 2009-10 Hilton
- 2010-11 Postal ALC
- 2011-12 St Laurence
- 2012-13 Glentanar Reflex
- 2013-14 Granite City
- 2014-15 Westhill
- 2015-16 Glendale XI
- 2016-17 Don Athletic
- 2017-18 St Marnans
- 2018-19 FC Polska
- 2019-20 Uncompleted
- 2020-21 Uncontested
- 2021-22 Uncontested
- 2022-23 AC Mill Inn Academy

=== Ian Napier Memorial Shield ===
A pre-season supercup contested between the previous season's Division One regional champions.

- 1980-81 Castle Rovers
- 1981-82 Cove Rangers
- 1982-83 No Competition
- 1983-84 No Competition
- 1984-85 Alford
- 1985-86 Kemnay Youth
- 1986-87 YMCA Rovers
- 1987-88 Turriff Amateurs
- 1988-89 Glendale
- 1989-90 Hermes
- 1990-91 Stoneywood Amateurs
- 1991-92 Inverurie FP's
- 1992-93 Queen's Cross Reflex
- 1993-94 University
- 1994-95 No Competition
- 1995-96 No Competition
- 1996-97 Woodside
- 1997-98 Blackburn
- 19*98-99 Sheddocksley
- 1999-00 Frigate
- 2000-01 Kingseat United
- 2001-02 No Competition
- 2002-03 Walker Road
- 2003-04 Aberdeen Sporting Club
- 2004-05 Luthermuir
- 2005-06 Mintlaw
- 2006-07 Burghmuir
- 2007-08 Nicolls Amateurs
- 2008-09 Banchory Amateurs
- 2009-10 Sportsmans Club
- 2010-11 Woodside
- 2011-12 Cove Thistle
- 2012-13 Luthermuir
- 2013-14 MS United
- 2014-15 RGU
- 2015-16 Torry Select
- 2016-17 AC Mill Inn
- 2017-18 Cove Thistle
- 2018-19 Insch
- 2019-20 Echt
- 2020-21 Uncontested
- 2021-22 Uncontested
- 2022-23 Alford

=== John Todd Memorial Trophy ===
A pre-season supercup contested between the winner and runner-up in the previous season's Premier Division.

- 2009-10 Echt
- 2010-11 University
- 2011-12 University
- 2012-13 Woodside
- 2013-14 Sportsmans Club
- 2014-15 Sportsmans Club
- 2015-16 Woodside
- 2016-17 Woodside
- 2017-18 Sportsmans Club

== Previous Cups and Shields ==
=== Cusiter Cup ===
- 1971-72 Alford
- 1972-73 Grampian Spurs
- 1973-74 Grampian Spurs
- 1974-75 Banchory St Ternan
- 1975-76 Longside
- 1976-77 Insch
- 1977-78 Carlton
- 1978-79 Powis FP's
- 1979-80 Kabell
- 1980-81 S.S. & S.C.
- 1981-82 Yule FC
- 1982-83 Balmoral Vics
- 1983-84 Michelin
- 1984-85 No Competition
- 1985-86 No Competition
- 1986-87 Kincorth
- 1987-88 Rothie Rovers
- 1988-89 Frigate
- 1989-90 Stoneywood Amateurs
- 1990-91 Stoneywood SSC
- 1991-92 Feughside
- 1992-93 Blackburn
- 1993-94 Woodside
- 1994-95 Echt
- 1995-96 Braemar
- 1996-97 Stoneywood Four Mile
- 1997-98 Sheddocksley
- 1998-99 Bridge of Don United
- 1999-00 Newtonhill
- 2000-01 Kintore

=== Millennium Cup ===
- 1999-00 Wilson's XI

=== Ewen Trophy ===
- 1972-73 Banchory
- 1973-74 Kemnay
- 1974-75 Cove Rangers
- 1975-76 Kemnay
- 1976-77 Glenavon S.C.
- 1977-78 Culter
- 1978-79 Dyce Amateurs
- 1979-80 Dyce Amateurs
- 1980-81 Culter
- 1981-82 Grandholm Rosslyn
- 1982-83 Longside
- 1983-84 Shamrock
- 1984-85 No Competition
- 1985-86 No Competition
- 1986-87 Mugiemoss
- 1987-88 Longside
- 1988-89 Grampian Police
- 1989-90 Raeden Thistle
- 1990-91 Cults
- 1991-92 Wilson's XI

=== AAFA Charity Cup ===
- 1989-90 Banchory St. Ternan
- 1990-91 Portlethen Thistle
- 1991-92 Blackthorn
- 1992-93 Glentanar

=== AAFA Fiftieth Anniversary Soccer World Cup ===
- 1997-98 Echt

=== Willie Gibb Memorial Trophy ===
- 1994-95 Glentanar
- 1995-96 No Competition
- 1996-97 Hilton

=== Paterson Cup ===
- 1967-68 Cove Rangers
- 1968-69 A.D. Club
- 1969-70 Port Thistle
- 1970-71 Newtonhill
- 1971-72 Chattan Rovers
- 1972-73 Marley United
- 1973-74 Marley United
- 1974-75 Stoneywood Amateurs
- 1975-76 Grampian Sports
- 1976-77 Cults
- 1977-78 Kintore
- 1978-79 Hermes
- 1979-80 Aboyne
- 1980-81 Aberdeen Shamrock
- 1981-82 Hermes
- 1982-83 Alford
- 1983-84 Kingseat
- 1984-85 No Competition
- 1985-86 No Competition
- 1986-87 Turriff Amateurs
- 1987-88 Beacon Rangers
- 1988-89 Walker Road
- 1989-90 Summerhill United
- 1990-91 Cowie Thistle
- 1991-92 FC Hayloft
- 1992-93 Scot/Douglas
- 1993-94 Cruden Bay
- 1994-95 RGU
- 1995-96 East End Amateurs
- 1996-97 AC Mill Inn
- 1997-98 Stonehaven White Heather
- 1998-99 AC Mill Inn
- 1999-00 Carlton
- 2000-01 College of Education

=== Norman McAvoy Memorial Trophy ===
- 1983-84 Banchory
- 1984-85 Hall Russell United
- 1985-86 Albion Rangers
- 1986-87 Ellon Thistle
- 1987-88 Ferryhill
- 1988-89 Kemnay Amateurs
- 1989-90 Walker Road
- 1990-91 Portlethen Thistle
- 1991-92 No Competition
- 1992-93 Wilson's XI
- 1993-94 Raeden Thistle
- 1994-95 Dyce
- 1995-96 No Competition
- 1996-97 Echt
- 1997-98 ALC Chattan
- 1998-99 Great Western United
- 1999-00 Sheddocksley
- 2000-01 Inverurie FPs

=== Neil Scott Memorial Trophy ===
- 1976 Culter
- 1977 Cove Rangers
- 1978 Culter
- 1979 Kemnay Amateurs
- 1980 Newtonhill
- 1981 Grandholm Rosslyn
- 1982 Cove Rangers
- 1983 Cove Rangers
- 1984 Cove Rangers
- 1985 Crombie Sports
- 1986 Longside
- 1987 Longside
- 1988 Kemnay Youth
- 1989 Grampian Police
- 1990 Great Western United

=== The P.J. Stuart Memorial Shield ===
- 1972-73 Ellon Youth XI
- 1973-74 Albion Rangers
- 1974-75 Longside
- 1975-76 Insch
- 1976-77 Carlton
- 1977-78 Denmore Thistle
- 1978-79 Kintore Youth
- 1979-80 Glentanar
- 1980-81 Kingseat
- 1981-82 Raeden Thistle
- 1982-83 Bieldside
- 1983-84 Chattan Rovers
- 1984-85 Huntly Amateurs

=== Trophies International Cup ===
- 1989-90 Banchory St. Ternan
- 1990-91 Banchory St. Ternan
- 1991-92 Kincorth
- 1992-93 Hermes
- 1993-94 Great Western United
- 1994-95 Skene Bieldside
- 1995-96 Dyce Amateurs
- 1996-97 Kemnay Youth
- 1997-98 Hilton
- 1998-99 Hilton
- 1999-00 Hilton
- 2000-01 Sheddocksley

== Champions ==
=== Premier Division ===
- 2001-02 Echt
- 2002-03 Kincorth
- 2003-04 Kincorth
- 2004-05 Sunnybank Amateurs
- 2005-06 Sunnybank Amateurs
- 2006-07 Echt
- 2007-08 Echt
- 2008-09 Cove Thistle
- 2009-10 Bon-Accord City
- 2010-11 Kincorth
- 2011-12 Woodside
- 2012-13 Sportsmans Club
- 2013-14 Sportsmans Club
- 2014-15 Cove Thistle
- 2015-16 RGU
- 2016-17 Woodside
- 2017-18 Woodside
- 2018-19 Woodside
- 2021-22 Kincorth
- 2022-23 Kincorth
- 2023-24 Cowie Thistle

=== Division One (North) ===
- 2001-02 Walker Road
- 2002-03 Sunnybank Amateurs
- 2003-04 Luthermuir
- 2004-05 Mintlaw
- 2005-06 Burghmuir
- 2006-07 Nicolls Amateurs
- 2007-08 Kincorth
- 2008-09 Sportsmans Club
- 2009-10 Beacon Rangers
- 2010-11 Mearns United
- 2011-12 Insch
- 2012-13 MS United
- 2013-14 Rothie Rovers
- 2014-15 Echt
- 2015-16 Westhill
- 2016-17 Cove Thistle
- 2017-18 Stoneywood East End
- 2018-19 Newburgh Thistle
- 2021-22 Nicolls Amateurs
- 2022-23 Kaimhill United

=== Division One (East) ===
- 2001-02 Cowie Thistle
- 2002-03 RGU
- 2003-04 Burghmuir
- 2004-05 Cove Thistle
- 2005-06 Beacon Rangers
- 2006-07 West End
- 2007-08 Banchory Amateurs
- 2008-09 Old Aberdonians
- 2009-10 Woodside
- 2010-11 Cove Thistle
- 2011-12 Luthermuir
- 2012-13 Beacon Rangers
- 2013-14 RGU
- 2014-15 Torry Select
- 2015-16 AC Mill Inn
- 2016-17 Cowie Thistle
- 2017-18 Insch
- 2018-19 Echt
- 2021-22 Alford
- 2022-23 Westdyke

=== Division Two (North) ===
- 2001-02 Glentanar Reflex
- 2002-03 Bridge of Don
- 2003-04 RGU
- 2004-05 Feughside
- 2005-06 Bucksburn United
- 2006-07 Bridge of Don
- 2007-08 Stonehaven Athletic
- 2008-09 Bucksburn United
- 2009-10 Lads Club Amateurs
- 2010-11 Don Athletic
- 2011-12 Bervie Caledonian
- 2012-13 Dee Amateurs
- 2013-14 Granite City
- 2014-15 Westhill
- 2015-16 Bon Accord City
- 2016-17 Newburgh Thistle
- 2017-18 Turriff Thistle
- 2018-19 Faithlie United
- 2021-22 Burghmuir
- 2022-23 University

=== Division Two (East) ===
- 2001-02 Huntly Amateurs
- 2002-03 Blackburn
- 2003-04 University Strollers
- 2004-05 Newtonhill
- 2005-06 Bervie Caledonian
- 2006-07 Lads Club Amateurs
- 2007-08 Glendale XI
- 2008-09 Glendale
- 2009-10 Ellon Amateurs
- 2010-11 Rothie Rovers
- 2011-12 Hazlehead United
- 2012-13 AC Mill Inn
- 2013-14 Grammar FP's
- 2014-15 Formartine United
- 2015-16 Rattrays XI
- 2016-17 Bridge of Don
- 2017-18 Tolbooth
- 2018-19 Colony Park
- 2021-22 Grammar
- 2022-23 Bon Accord City

== Previous League Winners ==
=== Division Two (South) ===
- 2001-02 Stoneywood Four Mile
- 2002-03 Mintlaw
- 2003-04 Bridge of Don
- 2004-05 Inverurie FPs

=== Division Three ===
- 2005-06 Kincorth Rovers
- 2006-07 Trophies International
- 2007-08 Kemnay Youth
- 2008-09 Hilton
- 2009-10 Portlethen United
- 2010-11 JS XI
- 2011-12 Dee Amateurs
- 2012-13 Granite City
- 2013-14 BSFC
- 2014-15 Sheddocksley
- 2015-16 Balmedie
- 2016-17 Faithlie United
- 2017-18 AFC Murdo's

=== Division One ===
- 1947-48 Cove Rangers
- 1948-49 Cove Rangers
- 1949-50 Ellon United
- 1950-51 Ellon United
- 1951-52 Millburn FC
- 1952-53 Millburn FC
- 1953-54 Cove Rangers
- 1954-55 Cove Rangers
- 1955-56 Cove Rangers
- 1956-57 Cove Rangers
- 1957-58 Cove Rangers
- 1958-59 Nicoll's XI
- 1959-60 Cove Rangers
- 1960-61 Cove Rangers
- 1961-62 Ellon United
- 1962-63 Ellon United
- 1963-64 Bon Accord FC
- 1964-65 Cove Rangers
- 1965-66 Aboyne
- 1966-67 Aberdeen City Police
- 1967-68 Aberdeen City Police
- 1968-69 Aberdeen City Police
- 1969-70 Aberdeen City Police
- 1970-71 Maud
- 1971-72 Kemnay
- 1972-73 Culter
- 1973-74 Culter
- 1974-75 Culter
- 1975-76 Culter
- 1976-77 Cove Rangers
- 1977-78 Kemnay
- 1978-79 Culter
- 1979-80 Culter
- 1980-81 Culter
- 1981-82 Grandholm Rosslyn
- 1982-83 Cove Rangers
- 1983-84 Aberdeen Shamrock
- 1984-85 Cove Rangers
- 1985-86 Crombie Sports
- 1986-87 Mugiemoss Amateurs
- 1987-88 Longside
- 1988-89 Hall Russell United
- 1989-90 Great Western United
- 1990-91 Kincorth
- 1991-92 Kincorth
- 1992-93 Kincorth
- 1993-94 Kincorth
- 1994-95 Dyce
- 1995-96 Hilton
- 1996-97 Echt
- 1997-98 Hilton
- 1998-99 Hilton
- 1999-00 Hilton
- 2000-01 Echt

=== Division Two ===
- 1951-52 Formartine United
- 1952-53 AFI FC
- 1953-54 Rattray's XI
- 1954-55 University
- 1955-56 Aboyne
- 1956-57 Nicoll's XI
- 1957-58 Kingseat
- 1958-59 Avondale
- 1959-60 Dyce Amateurs
- 1960-61 Bon Accord
- 1961-62 CWD Department
- 1962-63 Castle Rovers
- 1963-64 Culter
- 1964-65 Lads Club
- 1965-66 Orion
- 1966-67 Millburn
- 1967-68 Kemnay
- 1968-69 Maud
- 1969-70 Waterton Thistle
- 1970-71 Cove Thistle
- 1971-72 Newtonhill
- 1972-73 Banchory
- 1973-74 Chattan Rovers
- 1974-75 Aboyne
- 1975-76 Newtonhill
- 1976-77 University
- 1977-78 Albion Rangers
- 1978-79 Cornhill Thistle
- 1979-80 Longside
- 1980-81 Aboyne
- 1981-82 Blackthorn
- 1982-83 Shamrock
- 1983-84 Castle Rovers
- 1984-85 Hall Russell United
- 1985-86 Kemnay Youth
- 1986-87 Windsor
- 1987-88 Aboyne
- 1988-89 Glentanar
- 1989-90 Kincorth
- 1990-91 Portlethen Thistle
- 1991-92 Chattan Rovers
- 1992-93 Raeden Thistle
- 1993-94 Dyce
- 1994-95 Hilton
- 1995-96 Echt
- 1996-97 Cowie Thistle
- 1997-98 Glentanar
- 1998-99 Sheddocksley
- 1999-00 Frigate
- 2000-01 Nicoll's XI

=== Division Three ===
- 1950-51 Mutual Rovers
- 1951-52 AFI FC
- 1952-53 Rattray's XI
- 1953-54 Aberdeen University
- 1954-55 Fittie Rovers
- 1955-56 Nicoll's XI
- 1956-57 Cove Thistle
- 1957-58 Mackie Academy
- 1958-59 CWD Athletic
- 1959-60 No Competition
- 1960-61 No Competition
- 1961-62 No Competition
- 1962-63 No Competition
- 1963-64 No Competition
- 1964-65 No Competition
- 1965-66 No Competition
- 1966-67 Kemnay
- 1967-68 Newtonhill
- 1968-69 Queen's Cross
- 1969-70 Portlethen Thistle
- 1970-71 Inverurie FP's
- 1971-72 Strichen United
- 1972-73 Richard's XI
- 1973-74 Glenavon SC
- 1974-75 Stoneywood Amateurs
- 1975-76 Grampian Spurs
- 1976-77 Cults
- 1977-78 Inverurie FP's
- 1978-79 Longside
- 1979-80 Seaview Spurs
- 1980-81 Cove Thistle
- 1981-82 Aberdeen Shamrock
- 1982-83 Hatton
- 1983-84 Kingseat
- 1984-85 Kemnay Youth
- 1985-86 Windsor
- 1986-87 Queen's Cross
- 1987-88 Potterton
- 1988-89 Kincorth
- 1989-90 Portlethen Thistle
- 1990-91 Tarves
- 1991-92 Stoneywood SSC
- 1992-93 Huntly Amateurs
- 1993-94 Hilton
- 1994-95 Echt
- 1995-96 Braemar
- 1996-97 Banchory
- 1997-98 Sheddocksley
- 1998-99 Frigate
- 1999-00 Potterton
- 2000-01 Walker Road

=== Division Four ===
- 1969-70 Strichen United
- 1970-71 Chattan Rovers
- 1971-72 Wiggins Teape
- 1972-73 Alford
- 1973-74 Stoneywood Amateurs
- 1974-75 Ellon Thistle
- 1975-76 Cults
- 1976-77 Torphins
- 1977-78 Hermes
- 1978-79 Castle Rovers
- 1979-80 Newmachar
- 1980-81 Denmore Thistle
- 1981-82 S.S. & S.C.
- 1982-83 Yule FC
- 1983-84 Ferryhill
- 1984-85 Oxy Sporting Club
- 1985-86 Beacon Rangers
- 1986-87 Ashley Park
- 1987-88 Kincorth
- 1988-89 Portlethen Thistle
- 1989-90 Feughside
- 1990-91 Oxy S.C.
- 1991-92 FC Hayloft
- 1992-93 Hilton
- 1993-94 Echt
- 1994-95 RGU
- 1995-96 Turriff Amateurs
- 1996-97 Sheddocksley
- 1997-98 Frigate
- 1998-99 Cults
- 1999-00 Grammar FP's
- 2000-01 Carlton

=== Division Five ===
- 1971-72 Alford
- 1972-73 Central Dynamos
- 1973-74 Grampian Spurs
- 1974-75 Albion Rangers
- 1975-76 Longside
- 1976-77 Insch
- 1977-78 Trophy Centre
- 1978-79 Grampian CD
- 1979-80 Auchmill
- 1980-81 S.S. & S.C.
- 1981-82 Kingseat
- 1982-83 Ferryhill
- 1983-84 Michelin
- 1984-85 Chattan Rovers
- 1985-86 Potterton
- 1986-87 Kincorth
- 1987-88 Rothie Rovers
- 1988-89 Feughside
- 1989-90 Cowie Thistle
- 1990-91 Trophies International
- 1991-92 Hilton
- 1992-93 Cruden Bay
- 1993-94 RGU
- 1994-95 Bridge of Don
- 1995-96 Sheddocksley
- 1996-97 Frigate
- 1997-98 Royal Cornhill
- 1998-99 Carlton
- 1999-00 Halliburton
- 2000-01 Postal ALC

=== Division Six ===
- 1972-73 Ellon Youth
- 1973-74 Albion Rangers
- 1974-75 Longside
- 1975-76 Insch
- 1976-77 Carlton
- 1977-78 Denmore Thistle
- 1978-79 Kintore Youth
- 1979-80 Glentanar
- 1980-81 Kingseat
- 1981-82 Raeden Thistle
- 1982-83 Bieldside
- 1983-84 Chattan Rovers
- 1984-85 Huntly Amateurs
- 1985-86 Kincorth
- 1986-87 Rothie Rovers
- 1987-88 RAF Buchan
- 1988-89 FC Central
- 1989-90 Newmachar United
- 1990-91 Hilton
- 1991-92 Cruden Bay
- 1992-93 RGU
- 1993-94 AC Mill Inn
- 1994-95 Burghmuir
- 1995-96 Frigate

=== Division Seven ===
- 1978-79 Glentanar
- 1979-80 YMCA Rovers
- 1980-81 Ferryhill
- 1981-82 College of Education
- 1982-83 Chattan Rovers
- 1983-84 Walker Road
- 1984-85 Kincorth
- 1985-86 Rothie Rovers
- 1986-87 Bucksburn Thistle
- 1987-88 Phoenix
- 1988-89 Meldrum United
- 1989-90 Hilton
- 1990-91 Luthermuir
- 1991-92 Aboyne

=== Division Eight ===
- 1986-87 Meldrum United
- 1987-88 Newmachar United
- 1988-89 Newburgh Thistle
