= West Highland Amateur Football Association =

Scottish amateur football league

- Founded: 1985
- Country: Scotland
- Confederation: UEFA
- Divisions: 1
- Number of clubs: 7
- Level on pyramid: N/A
- Domestic cup(s): GF MacRae Cup, Ross Cup, Ewen MacRae Cup, Clan Donald Cup
- Current champions: Mallaig FC (2025)
- Website: Official Website

The West Highland Amateur Football Association (WHAFA) is a football association for amateur clubs in Skye, Lochalsh and Lochaber in the Scottish Highlands. The association is affiliated to the Scottish Amateur Football Association. Member clubs take part in a summer league as well as a number of domestic cups and the Highland Amateur Cup. Currently, the association is composed of a single division of seven clubs, although numbers of clubs and divisions have varied over the years.

Between 2005 and 2022, the association was known as the Skye and Lochalsh AFA. It reverted to its former name of West Highland AFA at the 2023 AGM to reflect the widening catchment area of the league with the inclusions of Mallaig in 2018 and Fort William Reserves in 2023.

== 2026 member clubs ==
The following clubs are current members of the association and take part in affiliated competitions.

- Fort William Reserves (established 2023)
- Kyleakin (established pre-1930)
- Lochlash (established 2026)
- Mallaig (joined 2018)
- Portree (established 1934)
- North West Skye (established 2015)
- Sleat & Strath (established 1972)
Location of teams in 2024 West Highland Amateur Football Association

== History ==
The West Highland Association was formed to amalgamate the Wester Ross and Skye leagues. On Thursday 9 May 1985, after discussions between representatives of the associations and consultations with the clubs involved, a meeting held in Kyle gave the go-ahead to a steering committee to formulate a draft constitution and rules for the West Highland Amateur Football Asosociation. The first competitions were held in 1986, with the twelve original member clubs split into two divisions. The number of teams entering varied from season to season, but the format was unchanged until 2001, when it was decided to adopt a single league. The switch was unanimously supported at the pre-season AGM.

Portree United was the first club to dominate the league, winning the first four editions. However Portree AFC then enjoyed a period of dominance, winning eleven league titles in a row between 1997 and 2007. Since 2010, Sleat & Strath have been the most successful team in the area, with seven league wins as well as numerous cup successes.

In 2018, Mallaig became the first team from Lochaber to join the association, and they have since become a major challenger for local honours.

The introduction of Fort William Reserves in 2023, making them the second side from Lochaber to join, led the association to revert to the West Highland AFA name which had been dropped in 2005 for Skye and Lochalsh AFA. There have been several other changes in membership: several clubs based in Skye and Lochalsh have folded or merged in recent years, such as Bernisdale, Dunvegan, Glenelg, Plockton, Portree United, Staffin, and Struan. Historically, some teams from Wester Ross have also been affiliated to the league: Gairloch/Aultbea United are the most recent example.

Kyle FC pulled out of competitions following the 2024 AGM, putting an end to several decades of continuous participation in the local league and cups.

== Competitions ==
- League - The summer competition runs from April to September.
- GF MacRae Cup - All teams in the association take part in this cup.
- Ross Cup - All teams in the association take part in this cup.
- Ewen MacRae Cup - Teams finishing in the top half of the league table meet in this end of season competition.
- Clan Donald Cup - Introduced in 2007. Teams finishing in the bottom half of the league table meet in this end of season competition.
- Highland Amateur Cup - A competition between clubs from participating Highland Associations including West Highland teams who choose to enter. Portree's run to the final in 2002 remains the best result for a West Highland side.

== List of League winners ==
These are the results for the West Highland League since its inception in 1986. The trophy, named the Bagshaw Cup, has been in use since the 1930s and it was previously presented to champions of the Wester Ross League.

Year	Champions	Runners-up	Third place
1986	Portree United		
1987	Portree United (2)		
1988	Portree United (3)		
1989	Portree United (4)		
1990	Gairloch		
1991	Kyleakin		
1992	Portree United (5)		
1993	Portree United (6)		
1994	Portree United (7)		
1995	Dunvegan		
1996	Dunvegan (2)		
1997	Portree		
1998	Portree (2)		
1999	Portree (3)		
2000	Portree (4)	Sleat & Strath	
2001	Portree (5)	Kyleakin	Sleat & Strath
2002	Portree (6)	Struan	Dunvegan
2003	Portree (7)	Plockton	Sleat & Strath
2004	Portree (8)	Kyle	Dunvegan
2005	Portree (9)	Kyle	Dunvegan
2006	Portree (10)	Dunvegan	Kyleakin
2007	Portree (11)	Dunvegan	Kyleakin
2008	Skeabost	Portree	Sleat & Strath
2009	Kyleakin (2)	Sleat & Strath	Skeabost
2010	Sleat & Strath	Dunvegan	Portree
2011	Sleat & Strath (2)	Kyleakin	Portree
2012	Kyleakin (3)	Sleat & Strath	Portree Juniors
2013	Sleat & Strath (3)	Portree	Portree Juniors
2014	Sleat & Strath (4)	Portree Juniors	Portree
2015	Portree (12)	Portree Juniors	Sleat & Strath
2016	Portree Juniors	Kyleakin	Sleat & Strath
2017	Kyleakin (4)	Portree Juniors	Sleat & Strath
2018	Mallaig	Kyleakin	Portree Juniors
2019	Mallaig (2)	Sleat & Strath	Kyleakin
2020	No Competition held		
2021	Sleat & Strath (5)	Mallaig	North West Skye
2022	Sleat & Strath (6)	Mallaig	North West Skye
2023	Mallaig (3)	Sleat & Strath	North West Skye
2024	Sleat & Strath (7)	Mallaig	North West Skye
2025	Mallaig (4)	Sleat & Strath	Fort William Reserves

== Total titles won ==
Rank	Club	Winners	Winning seasons
1	Portree	12	1997, 1998, 1999, 2000, 2001, 2002, 2003, 2004, 2005, 2006, 2007, 2015
2	Portree United	7	1986, 1987, 1988, 1989, 1992, 1993, 1994
2	Sleat & Strath	7	2010, 2011, 2013, 2014, 2021, 2022, 2024
4	Mallaig	5	2018, 2019, 2023, 2025, 2026
5	Kyleakin	4	1991, 2009, 2012, 2017
6	Dunvegan	2	1995, 1996
7	Gairloch	1	1990
7	Skeabost	1	2008
7	Portree Juniors	1	2016
