= Shetland Football Association =

- Founded: 1919
- Country: Scotland
- Confederation: UEFA
- Divisions: 3
- Number of clubs: 7 Premier League Teams 8 Reserve League Teams 6 Championship Teams
- Level on pyramid: N/A
- Promotion to: None
- Relegation to: None
- Domestic cup(s): Fraser Cup, Highland Fuels Cup, Manson Cup, Madrid Cup, County Shield, Bloomfield Cup, Joint Cup, Association Cup, Ditt Cup
- Current champions: Whalsay
- Most championships: Lerwick Spurs & Whitedale: 11
- Sponsor(s): Premiership: Ocean Kinetics Reserve League: DITT Championship: Jewsons
- Website: Official website

The Shetland Football Association runs Scotland's most northerly amateur association football league competitions, in Shetland, Scotland. The association is affiliated to the Scottish Amateur Football Association. Like several other Highland and Islands leagues, the fixtures are played over summer rather than the traditional winter calendar.

From the 2020 to 2024 season, the association was composed of a two separate divisions one of seven clubs: an 'A' League (Premier League), and one of eleven clubs 'B' league (Reserve League).

As of 2025, the association is split between three leagues; the Premier ('A') League, the Reserve ('B') League and the Championship. There is no promotion or relegation between leagues.

== League membership ==
In order to join the association, clubs must apply and are then voted in by current member clubs.

== Shetland Football leagues ==
=== Premier League ===
- Lerwick Celtic
- Lerwick Spurs
- Lerwick Thistle
- Ness United
- Scalloway
- Whalsay
- Whitedale

=== Reserve League ===
- Delting
- Lerwick Celtic Reserves
- Lerwick Spurs Reserves
- Lerwick Thistle Reserves
- Ness United Reserves
- Scalloway Reserves
- Whalsay Reserves
- Whitedale Reserves

=== Championship ===
- Bressay Sharks
- Ness United C
- North Isles
- Shetland Banks
- Southside Impact
- Wastside Rebels

(Joining in 2026)

- Boca Seniors
- Rusty Spoons

== Cup competitions ==
=== Premier League teams ===
- Bolts Car Hire Fraser Cup
- Highland Fuels Cup
- Northwards Manson Cup
- Jewsons Madrid Cup
- GTS County Shield

=== Reserve League teams ===
- Blue Shell Mussels Bloomfield Cup

=== Championship teams ===
- Blue Shell Mussels Bloomfield Cup
- Championship League Cup
