= North East Scotland Football Association =

The North East Scotland Football Association is an affiliated association of the Scottish Welfare Football Association, which itself is affiliated to the Scottish Football Association. It oversees recreational football mainly around the district of Buchan, in Aberdeenshire, Scotland.

The defending Premier Division champions are Invercairn United.

Competing clubs are also eligible to enter the Donald McNair Cup (a national competition for Welfare clubs) and the Highland Cup, contested against clubs from the Moray Welfare League

== Season 2022 ==
Team	Location
Ardallie	Ardallie
Banff Rovers	Banff
Bellslea	Fraserburgh
Boddam United	Boddam
Buchanhaven	Peterhead
Cuminestown United	Cuminestown
Elizabethan Link Up	Fraserburgh
FC Grampian	Ellon
Glenugie United	Peterhead
Haven	St Fergus
Invercairn United	Inverallochy
Macduff	Macduff
Mintlaw	Mintlaw
Methlick	Methlick
Mormond Thistle	Strichen
New Deer	New Deer
New Pitsligo	New Pitsligo
Peterhead United	Peterhead
St Combs	St Combs

Years	Premier Division		First Division
2021	Invercairn United	Elizabethan Link Up	
2020	cancelled		
2019	Invercairn United	Fyvie	
2018	Invercairn United	Buchanhaven	
2017	Invercairn United	Haven	
2016	Clinton Thistle	Haven	
2015	Clinton Thistle	Invercairn United	
2014	Clinton Thistle	Rosehearty Thistle	
2013	New Pitsligo	N/A	
