= Midlands Amateur Football Association =

- Country: Scotland
- Confederation: UEFA
- Divisions: 1
- Level on pyramid: N/A
- Promotion to: None
- Relegation to: None
- Domestic cup: Scottish Amateur Cup

The Midlands Amateur Football Association (MAFA) is an association football league competition for amateur clubs in the Dundee area of Scotland. The association is affiliated to the Scottish Amateur Football Association.

The association is currently composed of one division with 15 teams.

== League Membership ==
In order to join the association, clubs need to apply and are then voted in by current member clubs.
