= Saturday Morning Amateur Football League =

- Founded: 1962
- Country: Scotland
- Confederation: UEFA
- Divisions: 5 over 4 tiers
- Number of clubs: 65
- Level on pyramid: Sammys Italian Kitchen Premier, L4 Championship, Cutting Edge 1a & 1b divisions, and Luxe Contracts Development section
- Promotion to: Yes
- Relegation to: Yes
- Domestic cup(s): Scottish Amateur Cup West District Amateur Cup, Simplify Debt Strathclyde Cup, Cutting Edge Engravers Champions Cup, Inverclyde and Renfrewshire Cup, Glasgow Cup and Lanarkshire Cup
- Website: Official website

The Saturday Morning Amateur Football Association (SMAFA) is a football (soccer) league competition for amateur clubs in the West Central area of Scotland. The association is affiliated to the Scottish Amateur Football Association.

The League is currently made up of five divisions, over four tiers (Premier Division, Championship Divisions 1A & B with a Development Section).

== League membership and history ==
In order to join the association, clubs need to apply and are then voted in by current member clubs.

The League has now changed its name to SATURDAY MORNING AMATEUR FOOTBALL ASSOCIATION.

The League was formed in 1962 and contains clubs from all over the former Strathclyde region, from Airdrie in the east to Gourock in the west. It changed its name from the Strathclyde Civil Service League to the Strathclyde Saturday Morning Amateur Football League in 1989. The oldest active club in the League is Tynecastle AFC, who were formed in 1978 and still play their home matches at Stepford.

Despite the general decline in the number of amateur football clubs in Scotland, the SMAFA has continued to grow and now boasts one of the largest setups in the country, with 65 clubs participating in the 2022-23 season. Sadly, some of this growth was due to the demise of another league, which saw around 14 clubs join the association.

The League is currently endorsed by individual companies who sponsor the various divisions and cups, including Cutting Edge Engravers, Sammy's Italian Kitchen, L4 and LUXE contracts

The League was founded on a not-for-profit basis, and any excess funds at the end of each season are divided and refunded to the returning clubs.

The League also runs a Facebook page, Twitter account, and website. and also uses the wesoccer matchday app.

The League also raises money for charities, including SAMH Parkinsons, QEU Childrens Hospital, and local bereavement services.
