= Orkney Amateur Football Association =

- Country: Scotland
- Confederation: UEFA
- Divisions: 2
- Number of clubs: 12
- Level on pyramid: N/A
- Domestic cup: Highland Amateur Cup
- Current champions: Kirkwall Hotspurs
- Website: Official website

The Orkney Amateur Football Association (OAFA) is a football (soccer) league competition for amateur clubs in Orkney, Scotland. The association is affiliated to the Scottish Amateur Football Association. Like several other Highland and island leagues, fixtures are played over summer rather than the traditional winter calendar.

The association is composed of a two divisions of seven and five clubs. There is also an eight team reserve league. The OAFA also organise The Parish Cup a competition between the residents of parishes that make up Orkney.

== League membership ==
In order to join the association, clubs need to apply and are then voted in by current member clubs.

== 2022 league members ==
=== A League ===
- Dounby
- East United
- Kirkwall Hotspurs
- Kirkwall Thorfinn
- Kirkwall Rovers
- Rendall
- Stromness

=== B League ===
- Kirkwall Accies
- Streamline
- Firth
- Harray
- Wanderers
