= North Caledonian Cup =

Association football competition in Scotland

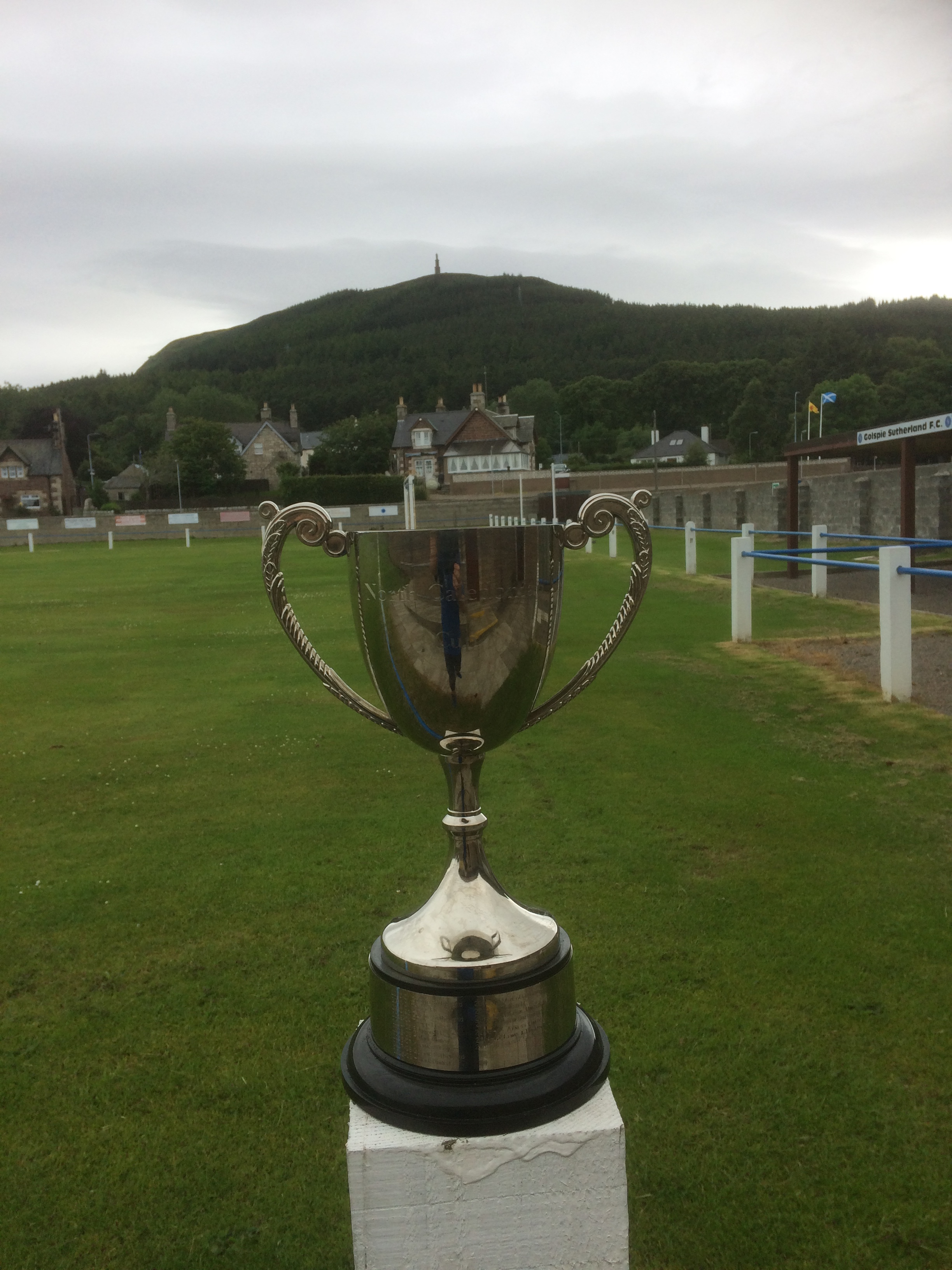
The new North Caledonian Cup, introduced after the original had been sent to Hampden Park for safekeeping.

The North Caledonian Cup, originally known as the North of Scotland Junior Cup and later the North of Scotland 2nd XI Cup is an annual association football cup for competition between football clubs across the Highlands & Islands of Scotland.

The cup is a registered Scottish FA competition which runs under the auspices of the North Caledonian FA.

== Origins ==
First introduced during the 1887–88 season as the flagship competition of the Inverness Junior Football Association, the North Caledonian Cup was initially known as the North of Scotland Junior FA Cup, introduced as an association football cup for competition between juniors clubs from Inverness and the surrounding districts across the North of Scotland.

In the season that followed, the Inverness Junior FA became known as the North of Scotland Junior FA and the cup would become its marquee competition.

The first competition was competed for between eighteen teams across the North of Scotland and was won in its first season by Inverness-based junior club Crusaders F.C.

== History ==
In its infancy, much like the Highland Football League, cup entrants were mostly teams from the Inverness area and its surrounding districts and for the latter part of the 19th century the competition was dominated by the 2nd XI combinations of senior clubs from the Highland League.

It was not until the 1902 that the trophy eventually left Inverness when Dingwall Victoria United - who would later become known as Ross County - won the trophy in two consecutive seasons.

While 2nd XI (reserve) clubs were still a dominant force, the growth of the junior club scene eventually led to teams from Tain, Grantown-on-spey, Elgin and Muir of Ord adding their name to the trophy.

When the North of Scotland Junior FA dropped its junior status in 1935, the competition became known as the North of Scotland 2nd XI Cup.

By the late 1960s, a surge in the formation of senior clubs throughout Ross-shire, Sutherland and Caithness resulted in a break-up in the dominance shown by the Highland Football League "2nd XI" sides.

In 1984, the association took the decision to rename the association once again, this time taking the name North Caledonian League, in a bid to "shake off" the 2nd XI reserve football stigma which had been attached to the cup since its introduction 97 years prior.

Almost a year later, at the annual general meeting of the North Caledonian FA, the trophy was renamed the North Caledonian Challenge Cup. Since 1972, only six senior reserve teams have won the trophy, the last being Inverness Caledonian Thistle 'A' in 1998–99.

In 2008, the original 121-year-old trophy was retired due to being in a state of poor repair and was sent to Hampden for safe keeping and refurbishment. Though the competition's lineage remained intact, a new trophy, more simply inscribed with the name North Caledonian Cup, was introduced to replace the original.

At the same time, the cup was briefly recognized and referred to as the Jock Mackay Memorial Cup before the competitions became two separate cups.

== Past winners ==
Season	Winner	Score	Runner-up	Venue	Notes
2025–26	Invergordon ^{[6]}	5–0	Fort William	Dalmore Park, Alness	
2024–25	Invergordon ^{[5]}	2–0	Golspie Sutherland	King George V Park, Golspie	
2023–24	Invergordon ^{[4]}	4–3	Loch Ness	Dalmore Park, Alness	
2022–23	Invergordon ^{[3]}	2–1	Golspie Sutherland	King George V Park, Golspie	
2021–22	St Duthus ^{[7]}	1–0	Halkirk United	Dudgeon Park, Brora	
2020–21	Competition not completed due to suspension of football activities as a result of COVID-19 outbreak				
2019–20	Competition not completed due to suspension of football activities as a result of COVID-19 outbreak				
2018–19	Invergordon ^{[2]}	2–0	Alness United	Dudgeon Park, Brora	
2017–18	St Duthus ^{[6]}	3–1	Golspie Sutherland	King George V Park, Golspie	St Duthus, 2017–18 winners
2016–17	Golspie Sutherland ^{[8]}	2–1	Invergordon	Dudgeon Park, Brora	
2015–16	Golspie Sutherland ^{[7]}	4–2	Lewis & Harris	Dalmore Park, Alness	
2014–15	Lewis & Harris	1–0	Golspie Sutherland	Dalmore Park, Alness	First team from the Western Isles to win the cup
2013–14	Alness United ^{[3]}	3–1	Muir of Ord Rovers	Pavilion Park, Muir of Ord	
2012–13	Muir of Ord Rovers ^{[6]}	1–0	Thurso	Dalmore Park, Alness	
2011–12	Halkirk United ^{[3]}	2–1	Golspie Sutherland	Dudgeon Park, Brora	
2010–11	Thurso ^{[3]}	4–1	Invergordon	King George V Park, Golspie	
2009–10	Muir of Ord Rovers ^{[5]}	2–1	Halkirk United	Bonar Bridge Park	Competition re-introduced to season calendar as the "North Caledonian Cup".; Jock Mackay Memorial Cup run as a separate competition from this season onwards
2008–09	Halkirk United ^{[2]}	5–2	Thurso	Recreation Grounds, Invergordon	Contested and promoted as the Jock Mackay Memorial Cup
2007–08	Golspie Sutherland ^{[6]}	2–2 ^{p}	Inverness City	Recreation Grounds, Invergordon	Golspie won 3–1 on penalties; Contested and promoted as the Jock Mackay Memorial Cup
2006–07	Inverness City	2–2 ^{p}	Golspie Sutherland	Recreation Grounds, Invergordon	Inverness City won 5–4 on penalties; Contested and promoted as the Jock Mackay Memorial Cup
2005–06	Halkirk United	3–1 ^{aet}	Alness United	Seaboard Park, Balintore	1–1 at full-time; Game also counted as a league result; Contested and promoted as the Jock Mackay Memorial Cup
2004–05	Balintore ^{[4]}	2–2 ^{p}	Invergordon	Seaboard Park, Balintore	Balintore won 2–1 on penalties; Contested and promoted as the Jock Mackay Memorial Cup, introduced in memory of long serving North Caledonian FA and Invergordon committee member, Jock Mackay
2003–04	Thurso ^{[2]}	1–0	Balintore	Dudgeon Park, Brora	
2002–03	Golspie Sutherland ^{[5]}	3–1	Dornoch	Dudgeon Park, Brora	
2001–02	Thurso	2–1	Alness United	King George V Park, Golspie	
2000–01	Golspie Sutherland ^{[4]}		Alness United		
1999–2000	Alness United ^{[2]}		Golspie Sutherland		
1998–99	Inverness Caledonian Thistle reserves	2–0	Golspie Sutherland	Grant Park, Tain	
1997–98	Balintore ^{[3]}	3–2	Invergordon		
1996–97	Balintore ^{[2]}	4–0	Halkirk United	King George V Park, Golspie	
1995–96	Fearn Thistle	4–3	Ross County reserves	Seaboard Park, Balintore	After extra time
1994–95	Clachnacuddin reserves ^{[15]}				
1993–94	Bonar Bridge ^{[2]}	2–1	St Duthus		After extra time
1992–93	Ross County reserves ^{[6]}	2–1	Caledonian reserves	Telford Street Park, Inverness	After extra time
1991–92	Clachnacuddin reserves ^{[14]}				
1990–91	Caledonian reserves ^{[15]}		Balintore		
1989–90	Tain St Duthus ^{[5]}	1–0	Balintore	Alness	
1988–89	Caledonian reserves ^{[14]}	3–1	Wick Academy	Dudgeon Park, Brora	
1987–88	Invergordon	3–3 ^{p}	Balintore	Victoria Park, Dingwall	Invergordon won 3–0 on penalties after extra time
1986–87	Tain St Duthus ^{[4]}	3–2	Brora Rangers reserves	King George V Park, Golspie	Tain St Duthus won 3–2 on penalties after extra time
1985–86	Wick Academy ^{[3]}	4–2	Dingwall Thistle	Dudgeon Park, Brora	
1984–85	Balintore	2–1	Bunillidh Thistle	King George V Park, Golspie	
1983–84	Tain St Duthus ^{[3]}	1–1 ^{p}	Balintore	Victoria Park, Dingwall	Tain St Duthus won 3–2 on penalties after extra time
1982–83	Muir of Ord Rovers ^{[4]}	2–0	Bunillidh Thistle	Victoria Park, Dingwall	
1981–82	Bunillidh Thistle ^{[2]}	1–0	Muir of Ord Rovers	Dudgeon Park, Brora	
1980–81	Wick Academy ^{[2]}	1–0	Invergordon	Dudgeon Park, Brora	
1979–80	Wick Academy	2–1	Muir of Ord Rovers	Dudgeon Park, Brora	First team from Caithness to win the cup
1978–79	Tain St Duthus ^{[2]}	3–2	Alness United	Migdale Park, Bonar Bridge	
1977–78	Bonar Bridge				
1976–77	Dingwall Thistle				
1975–76	Golspie Sutherland ^{[3]}				
1974–75	Golspie Sutherland ^{[2]}				
1973–74	Alness United				
1972–73	Ross County reserves ^{[5]}				
1971–72	Bunillidh Thistle				
1970–71	Caledonian reserves ^{[13]}				
1969–70	Ross County reserves ^{[4]}				
1968–69	Golspie Sutherland				
1967–68	Muir of Ord Rovers ^{[3]}				
1966–67	Black Rock Rovers (Evanton)				
1965–66	Caledonian reserves ^{[12]}				
1964–65	Brora Rangers reserves				First team from Sutherland to win the cup
1963–64	Clachnacuddin reserves ^{[13]}				
1962–63	Clachnacuddin reserves ^{[12]}				
1960–61	Clachnacuddin reserves ^{[11]}				
1959–60	Caledonian reserves ^{[11]}				
1958–59	Ross County reserves ^{[3]}				
1957–58	Clachnacuddin reserves ^{[10]}				
1956–57	Clachnacuddin reserves ^{[9]}				
1955–56	Clachnacuddin reserves ^{[8]}				
1954–55	Caledonian reserves ^{[10]}				
1953–54	Nairn County reserves				
1952–53	Nelson (Inverness) ^{[6]}				
1951–52	Loco Rangers				
1950–51	Ross County reserves ^{[2]}				
1949–50	Clachnacuddin reserves ^{[7]}				
1948–49	Caledonian reserves ^{[9]}				
1947–48	Caledonian reserves ^{[8]}				
1946–47	Ross County reserves	5–4	Invergordon	Grant Street Park, Inverness	
1938–39	Highland Light Infantry				
1937–38	Muir of Ord Rovers				
1936–37	Clachnacuddin reserves ^{[6]}				
1935–36	Nelson (Inverness) ^{[5]}				
1934–35	Muir of Ord Rovers ^{[2]}				
1933–34	Muir of Ord Rovers				
1932–33	Nelson (Inverness) ^{[4]}	1–0	Muir of Ord Rovers	Kingsmills Park, Inverness	
1931–32	Inverness Thistle reserves ^{[7]}				
1930–31	Inverness Thistle reserves ^{[6]}		Inverness Citadel reserves	Telford Street Park, Inverness	
1929–30	Clachnacuddin reserves ^{[5]}				
1928–29	Nelson (Inverness) ^{[3]}				
1927–28	Dingwall Victoria United ^{[3]}				
1926–27	Cameron Highlanders ^{[2]}				
1925–26	Inverness Thistle reserves ^{[5]}				
1924–25	St Duthus	2–1	Catch-my-Pal (Inverness)	Thistle Park, Inverness	
1923–24	Fortrose & Rosemarkie Union				
1922–23	Clachnacuddin reserves ^{[4]}				
1921–22	Caledonian reserves ^{[7]}		Inverness Citadel reserves		Final was replayed after first match ended 1–1
1920–21	Inverness Citadel reserves ^{[3]}	1–0	Dingwall Victoria United	Grant Street Park, Inverness	
1919–20	Clachnacuddin reserves ^{[3]}				
1913–14	Albert (Inverness)	3–2	Dingwall Victoria United	Inverness	
1912–13	Bishopmill United ^{[2]}	5–3	Dingwall Victoria United	Grant Street Park, Inverness	
1911–12	Bishopmill United	2–1	Dingwall Victoria United	Kingsmills Park, Inverness	
1910–11	Grantown Athletic	2–0	Inverness Thistle reserves	Grant Street Park, Inverness	First team from Moray to win the cup.
1909–10	Inverness Thistle reserves ^{[4]}				
1908–09	Clachnacuddin reserves ^{[2]}	3–0	Dingwall Victoria United	Kingsmills Park, Inverness	
1907–08	Nelson (Inverness) ^{[2]}	4–2	Inverness Citadel reserves	Inverness	
1906–07	Caledonian reserves ^{[6]}	3–1	Clachnacuddin reserves	Kingsmills Park, Inverness	Final was replayed after first match at Kingsmills Park ended 3–3
1905–06	Nelson (Inverness)	Awarded after Inverness Citadel reserves refused to contest replay.			After a first match ended in a draw, the game was replayed at Telford Street Park, Inverness, but at 2-0 to Citadel the referee abandoned the game due to mist with ten minutes left to play. A replay was scheduled but Citadel refused to contest it. The association thereafter awarded the trophy to Nelson.
1904–05	Caledonian reserves ^{[5]}				
1903–04	Dingwall Victoria United ^{[2]}	4–3	Caledonian reserves	Clachnacuddin Park, Inverness	
1902–03	Dingwall Victoria United	1–0	Inverness Citadel reserves	Clachnacuddin Park, Inverness	First team from outside of Inverness / first team from Ross & Cromarty to win the cup.
1901–02	Clachnacuddin reserves	4–0	Inverness Citadel reserves	Kingsmills Park, Inverness	
1900–01	Inverness Thistle reserves ^{[3]}		Caledonian reserves	Clachnacuddin Park, Inverness	
1899–1900	Caledonian reserves ^{[4]}				
1898–99	Heatherley FC (Inverness)				
1897–98	Inverness Citadel reserves ^{[2]}	2–1	Dingwall Victoria United	Thistle Park, Inverness	
1896–97	Inverness Citadel reserves	3–2	Inverness Celtic	Clachnacuddin Park, Inverness	Final was replayed after first match at Telford Street Park ended 2–2
1895–96	Caledonian reserves ^{[3]}	3–1	Cameron Highlanders	Kingsmills Park, Inverness	
1894–95	Caledonian reserves ^{[2]}	5–1	Heatherley FC (Inverness)	Clachnacuddin Park, Inverness	
1893–94	Inverness Thistle reserves ^{[2]}	5–1	Caledonian reserves	Thistle Park, Inverness	Final was replayed after first match at Clachnacuddin Park was abandoned in the second half due to snow with scores at 1–1
1892–93	Caledonian reserves	4–1	Inverness Citadel reserves	Telford Street Park, Inverness	
1891–92	Crown Strollers (Inverness)	3–2	Inverness Citadel reserves	Northern Meeting Park, Inverness	
1890–91	Inverness Thistle reserves	5–3	Caledonian reserves	Midmills Park, Inverness	
1889–90	Inverness Union reserves	2–0	Clachnacuddin reserves	Needlefield Park, Inverness	
1888–89	Cameron Highlanders	1–0	Inverness Union reserves	Needlefield Park, Inverness	Final was replayed after first match ended 2–2
1887–88	Crusaders (Inverness)	1–0	Crown (Inverness)	Cameron Barracks	First ever cup final

== Performance by club ==
Club	Wins	Years
Caledonian reserves	15	1892–93, 1894–95, 1895–96, 1899–1900, 1904–05, 1906–07, 1921–22, 1947–48, 1948–49, 1954–55, 1959–60, 1965–66, 1970–71, 1988–89, 1990–91
Clachnacuddin reserves	15	1901–02, 1908–09, 1919–20, 1922–23, 1929–30, 1936–37, 1949–50, 1955–56, 1956–57, 1957–58, 1960–61, 1962–63, 1963–64, 1991–92, 1994–95
Golspie Sutherland	8	1968–69, 1974–75, 1975–76, 2000–01, 2002–03, 2007–08, 2015–16, 2016–17
Inverness Thistle reserves	7	1890–91, 1893–94, 1900–91, 1909–10, 1925–26, 1930–31, 1931–32
Muir of Ord Rovers	7	1933–34, 1934–35, 1937–38, 1967–68, 1982–83, 2009–10, 2012–13
St Duthus	7	1924–25, 1978–79, 1983–84, 1986–87, 1989–90, 2017–18, 2021–22
Invergordon	6	1987–88, 2018–19, 2022–23, 2023–24, 2024–25, 2025–2026
Nelson (Inverness)	6	1905–06, 1907–08, 1928–29, 1932–33, 1935–36, 1953–53
Ross County reserves	6	1946–47, 1950–51, 1958–59, 1969–70, 1972–73, 1992–93
Balintore	4	1984–85, 1996–97, 1997–98, 2004–05
Alness United	3	1973–74, 1999–2000, 2013–14
Dingwall Victoria United	3	1902–03, 1903–04, 1927–28
Halkirk United	3	2005–06, 2008–09, 2011–12
Inverness Citadel reserves	3	1896–97, 1897–98, 1920–21
Thurso	3	2001–02, 2003–04, 2010–11
Wick Academy	3	1979–80, 1980–81, 1985–86
Bishopmill United	2	1911–12, 1912–13
Bonar Bridge	2	1977–78, 1993–94
Bunillidh Thistle	2	1971–72, 1981–82
Cameron Highlanders	2	1888–89, 1926–27
Albert (Inverness)	1	1913–14
Black Rock Rovers (Evanton)	1	1966–67
Brora Rangers reserves	1	1964–65
Crown Strollers (Inverness)	1	1891–92
Crusaders (Inverness)	1	1887–88
Dingwall Thistle	1	1976–77
Fearn Thistle	1	1995–96
Fortrose & Rosemarkie Union	1	1923–24
Grantown Athletic	1	1910–11
Heatherley FC (Inverness)	1	1898–99
Highland Light Infantry	1	1938–39
Inverness Caledonian Thistle reserves	1	1998–99
Inverness City	1	2006–07
Inverness Union reserves	1	1889–90
Lewis & Harris	1	2014–15
Loco Rangers	1	1951–52
Nairn County reserves	1	1953–54
