= 2022–23 in Scottish football =

Scottish Football

Football in Scotland
- Season: 2022–23

2022–23 in Scottish football
- Premiership champions
- Celtic
- Championship champions
- Dundee
- League 1 champions
- Dunfermline Athletic
- League 2 champions
- Stirling Albion
- Scottish Cup winners
- Celtic
- League Cup winners
- Celtic
- Challenge Cup winners
- Hamilton Academical
- Youth Cup winners
- Celtic
- Teams in Europe
- Celtic, Rangers, Heart of Midlothian, Dundee United, Motherwell
- Scotland national team
- UEFA Euro 2024 qualifying

The 2022–23 season was the 126th season of competitive football in Scotland. The domestic season began on 9 July 2022 with the first Scottish League Cup group stage matches, and the first round of matches in the 2022–23 Scottish Premiership were played on 30 July.

== League competitions ==
=== Scottish Premiership ===
Pos	Team	Pld	W	D	L	GF	GA	GD	Pts	Qualification or relegation (Note: Teams play each other three times (33 matches), before the league is split into two groups (the top six and the bottom six).)
1	Celtic (C)	38	32	3	3	114	34	+80	99	Qualification for the Champions League group stage
2	Rangers	38	29	5	4	93	37	+56	92	Qualification for the Champions League third qualifying round
3	Aberdeen	38	18	3	17	56	60	−4	57	Qualification for the Europa League play-off round
4	Heart of Midlothian	38	15	9	14	63	57	+6	54	Qualification for the Europa Conference League third qualifying round
5	Hibernian	38	15	7	16	57	59	−2	52	Qualification for the Europa Conference League second qualifying round
6	St Mirren	38	12	10	16	43	61	−18	46	
7	Motherwell	38	14	8	16	53	51	+2	50	
8	Livingston	38	13	7	18	36	60	−24	46	
9	St Johnstone	38	12	7	19	41	59	−18	43	
10	Kilmarnock	38	11	7	20	37	62	−25	40	
11	Ross County (O)	38	9	7	22	37	60	−23	34	Qualification for the Premiership play-off final
12	Dundee United (R)	38	8	7	23	40	70	−30	31	Relegation to Championship

Rules for classification: 1) Points; 2) Goal difference; 3) Goals scored; 4) Head-to-Head points; 5) Head-to-Head goal difference; 6) Play-off (only if deciding champion, UEFA competitions qualification, second stage group allocation or relegation).
(C) Champions; (O) Play-off winners; (R) Relegated

=== Scottish Championship ===
Pos	Team	Pld	W	D	L	GF	GA	GD	Pts	Promotion, qualification or relegation
1	Dundee (C, P)	36	17	12	7	66	40	+26	63	Promotion to the Premiership
2	Ayr United	36	16	10	10	61	43	+18	58	Qualification for the Premiership play-off semi-final
3	Queen's Park	36	17	7	12	63	52	+11	58	Qualification for the Premiership play-off quarter-final
4	Partick Thistle	36	16	9	11	65	45	+20	57	Qualification for the Premiership play-off quarter-final
5	Greenock Morton	36	15	12	9	53	43	+10	57	
6	Inverness Caledonian Thistle	36	15	10	11	52	47	+5	55	
7	Raith Rovers	36	11	10	15	46	49	−3	43	
8	Arbroath	36	6	16	14	29	47	−18	34	
9	Hamilton Academical (R)	36	7	10	19	31	63	−32	31	Qualification for the Championship play-offs
10	Cove Rangers (R)	36	7	10	19	38	75	−37	31	Relegation to League One

Rules for classification: 1) Points; 2) Goal difference; 3) Goals scored; 4) Head-to-to head points; 5) Head-to-head goal difference; 6) Play-off (only for deciding promotion, play-off participation and relegation).
(C) Champions; (P) Promoted; (R) Relegated

=== Scottish League One ===
Pos	Team	Pld	W	D	L	GF	GA	GD	Pts	Promotion, qualification or relegation
1	Dunfermline Athletic (C, P)	36	23	12	1	63	21	+42	81	Promotion to the Championship
2	Falkirk	36	19	10	7	70	39	+31	67	Qualification for the Championship play-offs
3	Airdrieonians (O, P)	36	17	9	10	82	51	+31	60	Qualification for the Championship play-offs
4	Alloa Athletic	36	17	6	13	56	47	+9	57	Qualification for the Championship play-offs
5	Queen of the South	36	16	6	14	59	59	0	54	
6	Edinburgh	36	15	6	15	60	55	+5	51	
7	Montrose	36	13	9	14	50	55	−5	48	
8	Kelty Hearts	36	10	10	16	39	54	−15	40	
9	Clyde (R)	36	5	9	22	35	68	−33	24	Qualification for the League One play-offs
10	Peterhead (R)	36	3	7	26	19	84	−65	16	Relegation to League Two

Rules for classification: 1) Points; 2) Goal difference; 3) Goals scored; 4) Head-to-to head points; 5) Head-to-head goal difference; 6) Play-off (only for deciding promotion, play-off participation and relegation).
(C) Champions; (O) Play-off winners; (P) Promoted; (R) Relegated

=== Scottish League Two ===
Pos	Team	Pld	W	D	L	GF	GA	GD	Pts	Promotion, qualification or relegation
1	Stirling Albion (C, P)	36	21	10	5	67	37	+30	73	Promotion to League One
2	Dumbarton	36	18	8	10	49	39	+10	62	Qualification for the League One play-offs
3	Annan Athletic (O, P)	36	14	9	13	61	51	+10	51	Qualification for the League One play-offs
4	East Fife	36	14	8	14	54	50	+4	50	Qualification for the League One play-offs
5	Forfar Athletic	36	13	9	14	37	43	−6	48	
6	Stenhousemuir	36	12	11	13	51	55	−4	47	
7	Stranraer	36	12	9	15	43	57	−14	45	
8	Bonnyrigg Rose	36	11	9	16	36	47	−11	42	
9	Elgin City	36	11	7	18	44	62	−18	40	
10	Albion Rovers (R)	36	11	6	19	47	48	−1	39	Qualification for the League Two play-off final

Rules for classification: 1) Points; 2) Goal difference; 3) Goals scored; 4) Head-to-to head points; 5) Head-to-head goal difference; 6) Play-off (only for deciding promotion, play-off participation and relegation).
(C) Champions; (O) Play-off winners; (P) Promoted; (R) Relegated

=== Non-league football ===
==== Level 5 ====
Highland Football League
Pos	Team	Pld	Pts
1	Brechin City (C)	34	89
2	Buckie Thistle	34	87
3	Brora Rangers	34	80
4	Formartine United	34	74
5	Fraserburgh	34	71
6	Inverurie Loco Works	34	50
7	Nairn County	34	46
8	Huntly	34	45
9	Rothes	34	44
10	Banks O' Dee	34	39
11	Forres Mechanics	34	36
12	Turriff United	34	36
13	Clachnacuddin	34	34
14	Lossiemouth	34	27
15	Keith	34	27
16	Wick Academy	34	26
17	Deveronvale	34	24
18	Strathspey Thistle	34	10

(C) Champions

Lowland Football League
Pos	Team	Pld	Pts
1	The Spartans (C, O, P)	36	79
2	Rangers B	36	77
3	Celtic B	36	76
4	University of Stirling	36	71
5	Tranent Juniors	36	65
6	East Kilbride	36	64
7	Berwick Rangers	36	61
8	Civil Service Strollers	36	58
9	Bo'ness United	36	54
10	Caledonian Braves	36	51
11	Broomhill	36	51
12	Gala Fairydean Rovers	36	49
13	Heart of Midlothian B	36	48
14	Cumbernauld Colts	36	46
15	Cowdenbeath	36	36
16	East Stirlingshire	36	33
17	Gretna 2008	36	26
18	Edinburgh University	36	16
19	Dalbeattie Star (R)	36	8

Source: SLFL BBC Sport Soccerway
(C) Champions;
(O) Play-off winners;
(P) Promoted;
(R) Relegated

==== Level 6 ====
===== Highland =====
Midlands Football League
Pos	Team	Pld	Pts
1	Carnoustie Panmure (C)	36	88
2	Broughty Athletic	36	85
3	Downfield	36	82
4	Lochee United	36	81
5	Dundee North End	36	76
6	East Craigie	36	75
7	Kirriemuir Thistle	36	69
8	Tayport	36	60
9	Letham	36	53
10	Arbroath Victoria	36	43
11	Forfar United	36	42
12	Dundee Violet	36	39
13	Coupar Angus	36	35
14	Scone Thistle	36	35
15	Dundee St James	36	31
16	Blairgowrie	36	25
17	Lochee Harp	36	20
18	Brechin Victoria	36	19
19	Forfar West End	36	17

(C) Champions

North Caledonian Football League
Pos	Team	Pld	Pts
1	Loch Ness (C)	24	62
2	Invergordon	24	58
3	Fort William	24	45
4	St Duthus	24	44
5	Orkney	24	42
6	Golspie Sutherland	24	42
7	Inverness Athletic	24	40
8	Halkirk United	24	32
9	Alness United	24	31
10	Clachnacuddin Reserves	24	27
11	Nairn County A	24	16
12	Thurso	24	15
13	Bonar Bridge	24	3

Source: North Caledonian Football League
(C) Champions

North Region Premier Division
Pos	Team	Pld	Pts
1	Culter (C)	26	73
2	Hermes	26	65
3	Dyce	26	49
4	Stonehaven	26	45
5	Bridge of Don Thistle	26	42
6	Stoneywood Parkvale	26	40
7	East End	26	38
8	Ellon United	26	34
9	Montrose Roselea	26	33
10	Maud	26	24
11	Colony Park	26	23
12	Nairn St Ninian	26	20
13	Banchory St Ternan (R)	26	9
14	Dufftown (R)	26	8

(C) Champions;
(R) Relegated

===== Lowland =====
East of Scotland Football League
Pos	Team	Pld	Pts
1	Linlithgow Rose (C, P)	30	74
2	Sauchie Juniors	30	65
3	Musselburgh Athletic	30	56
4	Dundonald Bluebell	30	51
5	Jeanfield Swifts	30	49
6	Penicuik Athletic	30	48
7	Haddington Athletic	30	47
8	Crossgates Primrose	30	46
9	Broxburn Athletic	30	43
10	Lothian Thistle Hutchison Vale	30	43
11	Inverkeithing Hillfield Swifts	30	37
12	Tynecastle	30	37
13	Hill of Beath Hawthorn	30	36
14	Blackburn United (R)	30	30
15	Oakley United (R)	30	6
16	Vale of Leithen (R)	30	−6

Source: East of Scotland Football League
(C) Champions;
(P) Promoted;
(R) Relegated

South of Scotland Football League
Pos	Team	Pld	Pts
1	Abbey Vale (C)	22	58
2	Creetown	22	55
3	Lochar Thistle	22	49
4	Stranraer reserves	22	43
5	Newton Stewart	22	40
6	Mid-Annandale	22	38
7	St Cuthbert Wanderers	22	26
8	Upper Annandale	22	19
9	Lochmaben	22	17
10	Nithsdale Wanderers	22	16
11	Caledonian Braves reserves	22	14
12	Wigtown & Bladnoch	22	7

(C) Champions

West of Scotland Football League
Pos	Team	Pld	Pts
1	Beith Juniors (C)	30	66
2	Auchinleck Talbot	30	57
3	Darvel	30	56
4	Clydebank	30	52
5	Pollok	30	48
6	Largs Thistle	30	47
7	Hurlford United	30	45
8	Irvine Meadow XI	30	43
9	Cumnock Juniors	30	42
10	Glenafton Athletic	30	42
11	Troon	30	42
12	Kirkintilloch Rob Roy	30	36
13	Arthurlie	30	30
14	Petershill (R)	30	28
15	Kilwinning Rangers (R)	30	26
16	Cambuslang Rangers (R)	30	20

Source: West of Scotland Football League
(C) Champions;
(R) Relegated

== Honours ==
=== Cup honours ===
Competition	Winner	Score	Runner-up	Match report
2022–23 Scottish Cup	Celtic	3–1	Inverness Caledonian Thistle	BBC Sport
2022–23 League Cup	Celtic	2–1	Rangers	BBC Sport
2022–23 Challenge Cup	Hamilton Academical	1–0	Raith Rovers	BBC Sport
2022–23 South Challenge Cup	The Spartans	2–1	Drumchapel United	
2022–23 Youth Cup	Celtic	6–5 (aet)	Rangers	BBC Sport
2022–23 Junior Cup	Cumnock Juniors	1–0	Rutherglen Glencairn	BBC Sport

=== Non-league honours ===
Level	Competition	Winner
5	Highland League	Brechin City
5	Lowland League	The Spartans
6	Midlands League	Carnoustie Panmure
6	North Caledonian League	Loch Ness
6	North Premier Division	Culter
6	East of Scotland League Premier Division	Linlithgow Rose
6	South of Scotland League	Abbey Vale
6	West of Scotland League Premier Division	Beith Juniors
7	North Championship	Sunnybank
7	East of Scotland League First Division	Dunbar United
7	West of Scotland League First Division	Gartcairn
8	East of Scotland League Second Division	Whitburn
8	West of Scotland League Second Division	Renfrew
9	East of Scotland League Third Division	Bo'ness Athletic
9	West of Scotland League Third Division	Vale of Clyde
10	West of Scotland League Fourth Division	West Park United

=== Individual honours ===
==== PFA Scotland awards ====
Award	Winner	Team
Players' Player of the Year	Kyogo Furuhashi	Celtic
Young Player of the Year	Malik Tillman	Rangers
Manager of the Year	Ange Postecoglou	Celtic
Championship Player	Dipo Akinyemi	Ayr United
League One Player	Calum Gallagher	Airdrieonians
League Two Player	Charlie Reilly	Albion Rovers

==== SFWA awards ====
Award	Winner	Team
Footballer of the Year	Kyogo Furuhashi	Celtic
Young Player of the Year	Max Johnston	Motherwell
Manager of the Year	Ange Postecoglou	Celtic

== Scottish clubs in Europe ==
=== Summary ===
Club	Competitions	Started round	Final round	Coef.
Celtic	UEFA Champions League	Group stage	Group stage	6.000
Rangers	UEFA Champions League	Third qualifying round	Group stage	6.500
Heart of Midlothian	UEFA Europa League	Play-off round	Play-off round	4.000
Heart of Midlothian	UEFA Conference League	Group stage	Group stage	4.000
Dundee United	UEFA Conference League	Third qualifying round	Third qualifying round	1.000
Motherwell	UEFA Conference League	Second qualifying round	Second qualifying round	0.000
Total				17.500
Average				3.500

=== Celtic ===
UEFA Champions League

Celtic entered the 2022–23 UEFA Champions League in the group stage, having won the 2021–22 Scottish Premiership.

6 September 2022 Group F	Celtic (Scotland)	0–3	(Spain) Real Madrid	Glasgow
		Report	Vinícius 56'; Modrić 60'; Hazard 77'	Stadium: Celtic Park; Attendance: 57,057; Referee: Sandro Schärer (Switzerland)

14 September 2022 Group F	Shakhtar Donetsk (Ukraine)	1–1	(Scotland) Celtic	Warsaw
	Mudryk 29'	Report	Bondarenko 10' (o.g.)	Stadium: Stadion Wojska Polskiego; Attendance: 20,697; Referee: Glenn Nyberg (Sweden)

5 October 2022 Group F	RB Leipzig (Germany)	3–1	(Scotland) Celtic	Leipzig
	Nkunku 27'; Silva 64', 77'		Jota 47'	Stadium: Red Bull Arena; Attendance: 45,228; Referee: Espen Eskås (Norway)

11 October 2022 Group F	Celtic (Scotland)	0–2	(Germany) RB Leipzig	Glasgow
		Report	Werner 75'; Forsberg 84'	Stadium: Celtic Park; Attendance: 57,565; Referee: Halil Umut Meler (Turkey)

25 October 2022 Group F	Celtic (Scotland)	1–1	(Ukraine) Shakhtar Donetsk	Glasgow
	Giakoumakis 34'	Report	Mudryk 58'	Stadium: Celtic Park; Attendance: 57,478; Referee: Serdar Gözübüyük (Netherlands)

2 November 2022 Group F	Real Madrid (Spain)	5–1	(Scotland) Celtic	Madrid
	Modrić 6' (pen.); Rodrygo 21' (pen.); Asensio 51'; Vinícius 61'; Valverde 71'	Report	Jota 84'	Stadium: Santiago Bernabéu Stadium; Attendance: 52,511; Referee: Stéphanie Frappart (France)

=== Rangers ===
UEFA Champions League

Rangers entered the 2022–23 UEFA Champions League in the third qualifying round, having finished second in the 2021–22 Scottish Premiership.

2 August 2022 QR3	Union SG (Belgium)	2–0	(Scotland) Rangers	Leuven
	Teuma 27'; Vanzeir 76' (pen.)	Report		Stadium: Den Dreef; Attendance: 1,100; Referee: Irfan Peljto (Bosnia and Herzegovina)

9 August 2022 QR3	Rangers (Scotland)	3–0 (3–2 agg.)	(Belgium) Union SG	Glasgow
	Tavernier 45' (pen.); Colak 58'; Tillman 78'	Report		Stadium: Ibrox Stadium; Attendance: 48,454; Referee: Anastasios Sidiropoulos (Greece)

16 August 2022 PO	Rangers (Scotland)	2–2	(Netherlands) PSV Eindhoven	Glasgow
	Čolak 40'; Lawrence 70'	Report	Sangaré 37'; Obispo 78'	Stadium: Ibrox Stadium; Attendance: 49,097; Referee: Daniele Orsato (Italy)

24 August 2022 PO	PSV Eindhoven (Netherlands)	0–1 (2–3 agg.)	(Scotland) Rangers	Eindhoven
		Report	Čolak 60'	Stadium: Philips Stadion; Attendance: 34,893; Referee: Szymon Marciniak (Poland)

7 September 2022 Group A	Ajax (Netherlands)	4–0	(Scotland) Rangers	Amsterdam
	Álvarez 17'; Berghuis 32'; Kudus 33'; Bergwijn 80'	Report		Stadium: Johan Cruyff Arena; Attendance: 52,862; Referee: Tobias Stieler (Germany)

14 September 2022 Group A	Rangers (Scotland)	0–3	(Italy) Napoli	Glasgow
		Report	Politano 68' (pen.); Raspadori 85'; Ndombele 90+1'	Stadium: Ibrox Stadium; Attendance: 50,121; Referee: Antonio Mateu Lahoz (Spain)

4 October 2022 Group A	Liverpool (England)	2–0	(Scotland) Rangers	Liverpool
	Alexander-Arnold 7'; Salah 53' (pen.)	Report		Stadium: Anfield; Attendance: 49,512; Referee: Clément Turpin (France)

12 October 2022 Group A	Rangers (Scotland)	1–7	(England) Liverpool	Glasgow
	Arfield 17'	Report	Firmino 24', 55'; Núñez 66'; Salah 76', 80', 81'; Elliott 87'	Stadium: Ibrox Stadium; Attendance: 48,820; Referee: Slavko Vinčić (Slovenia)

26 October 2022 Group A	Napoli (Italy)	3–0	(Scotland) Rangers	Naples
	Simeone 11', 16'; Østigård 80'	Report		Stadium: Stadio Diego Armando Maradona; Attendance: 39,835; Referee: Halil Umut Meler (Turkey)

1 November 2022 Group A	Rangers (Scotland)	1–3	(Netherlands) Ajax	Glasgow
	Tavernier 87' (pen.)	Report	Berghuis 4'; Kudus 29'; Conceição 89'	Stadium: Ibrox Stadium; Attendance: 48,817; Referee: Glenn Nyberg (Sweden)

=== Heart of Midlothian ===
UEFA Europa League

Hearts entered the 2022–23 UEFA Europa League in the playoff round, having finished third in the 2021–22 Scottish Premiership.

18 August 2022 PO	Zürich (Switzerland)	2–1	(Scotland) Heart of Midlothian	St. Gallen
	Guerrero 32'; Džemaili 34'	Report	Shankland 22' (pen.)	Stadium: Kybunpark; Attendance: 7,958; Referee: Bartosz Frankowski (Poland)

25 August 2022 PO	Heart of Midlothian (Scotland)	0–1 (1–3 agg.)	(Switzerland) Zürich	Edinburgh
		Report	Rohner 80'	Stadium: Tynecastle Park; Attendance: 17,225; Referee: Lawrence Visser (Belgium)

UEFA Europa Conference League

8 September 2022 Group A	Heart of Midlothian (Scotland)	0–4	(Turkey) İstanbul Başakşehir	Edinburgh
		Report	Kaldırım 26'; Ndayishimiye 67'; Kingsley 75' (o.g.); Özcan 82'	Stadium: Tynecastle Park; Attendance: 15,131; Referee: Krzysztof Jakubik (Poland)

15 September 2022 Group A	RFS Riga (Latvia)	0–2	(Scotland) Heart of Midlothian	Riga
		Report	Shankland 43' (pen.); Forrest 90+3'	Stadium: Skonto Stadium; Attendance: 6,747; Referee: Aleksandar Stavrev (North Macedonia)

6 October 2022 Group A	Heart of Midlothian (Scotland)	0–3	(Italy) Fiorentina	Edinburgh
		Report	Mandragora 4'; Kouamé 42'; Jović 79'	Stadium: Tynecastle Park; Attendance: 17,243; Referee: Erik Lambrechts (Belgium)

13 October 2022 Group A	Fiorentina (Italy)	5–1	(Scotland) Heart of Midlothian	Florence
	Jović 6'; Biraghi 22'; González 32', 79' (pen.); Barák 38'	Report	Humphrys 47'	Stadium: Stadio Artemio Franchi; Attendance: 18,576; Referee: Ivan Bebek (Croatia)

27 October 2022 Group A	Heart of Midlothian (Scotland)	2–1	(Latvia) RFS Riga	Edinburgh
	Shankland 3'; Halliday 12'	Report	Friesenbichler 39'	Stadium: Tynecastle Park; Attendance: 15,863; Referee: Bram Van Driessche (Belgium)

3 November 2022 Group A	İstanbul Başakşehir (Turkey)	3–1	(Scotland) Heart of Midlothian	Istanbul
	Ndayishimiye 4'; Gürler 33'; Özcan 64'	Report	Atkinson 90'	Stadium: Başakşehir Fatih Terim Stadium; Attendance: 4,824; Referee: Goga Kikacheishvili (Georgia)

=== Dundee United ===
UEFA Europa Conference League

Dundee United entered the 2022–23 UEFA Europa Conference League in the third qualifying round, after finishing fourth in the 2021–22 Scottish Premiership.

4 August 2022 QR3	Dundee United (Scotland)	1–0	(Netherlands) AZ Alkmaar	Dundee
	Middleton 61'	Report		Stadium: Tannadice Park; Attendance: 10,181; Referee: Vítor Ferreira (Portugal)

11 August 2022 QR3	AZ Alkmaar (Netherlands)	7–0 (7–1 agg.)	(Scotland) Dundee United	Alkmaar
	Pavlidis 21', 36'; Reijnders 31', 41'; Evjen 44'; D. de Wit 46'; Lahdo 74'	Report		Stadium: AFAS Stadion; Attendance: 11,005; Referee: Antonio Mateu Lahoz (Spain)

=== Motherwell ===
UEFA Europa Conference League

Motherwell entered the 2022–23 UEFA Europa Conference League in the second qualifying round, after finishing fifth in the 2021–22 Scottish Premiership.

21 July 2022 QR2	Motherwell (Scotland)	0–1	(Republic of Ireland) Sligo Rovers	Motherwell
		Report	Keena 27'	Stadium: Fir Park; Attendance: 7,227; Referee: Kári Á Høvdanum (Faroe Islands)

28 July 2022 QR2	Sligo Rovers (Republic of Ireland)	2–0 (3–0 agg.)	(Scotland) Motherwell	Sligo
	Blaney 4'; Mata 90+1'	Report		Stadium: The Showgrounds; Attendance: 3,876; Referee: Bojan Pandžić (Sweden)

== Scotland national team ==
21 September 2022 Nations League B	Scotland	3–0	Ukraine	Glasgow
	McGinn 70'; Dykes 80', 87'	Report		Stadium: Hampden Park; Attendance: 42,846; Referee: Maurizio Mariani (Italy)

24 September 2022 Nations League B	Scotland	2–1	Republic of Ireland	Glasgow
	Hendry 50'; Christie 82' (pen.)	Report	Egan 18'	Stadium: Hampden Park; Attendance: 48,853; Referee: Sandro Schärer (Switzerland)

27 September 2022 Nations League B	Ukraine	0–0	Scotland	Kraków
		Report		Stadium: Jozef Pilsudski Stadium; Attendance: 13,534; Referee: Anastasios Sidiropoulos (Greece)

16 November 2022 Friendly	Turkey	2–1	Scotland	Diyarbakir
	Kabak 40'; Under 49'	Report	McGinn 62'	Stadium: Diyarbakir Stadium; Attendance: 28,348; Referee: Visar Kastrati (Kosovo)

25 March 2023 Euro 2024 qualifying	Scotland	3–0	Cyprus	Glasgow
14:00	McGinn 21'; McTominay 87', 90+3'	Report		Stadium: Hampden Park; Attendance: 48,195; Referee: Duje Strukan (Croatia)

28 March 2023 Euro 2024 qualifying	Scotland	2–0	Spain	Glasgow
19:45	McTominay 7', 51'	Report		Stadium: Hampden Park; Attendance: 47,976; Referee: Sandro Schärer (Switzerland)

17 June 2023 Euro 2024 qualifying	Norway	1–2	Scotland	Oslo
	Haaland 61' (pen.)	Report	Dykes 87'; McLean 89'	Stadium: Ullevaal Stadion; Attendance: 25,791; Referee: Matej Jug (Slovenia)

20 June 2023 Euro 2024 qualifying	Scotland	2–0	Georgia	Glasgow
	McGregor 6'; McTominay 47'	Report		Stadium: Hampden Park; Attendance: 50,062; Referee: Istvan Vad (Hungary)

== Women's football ==
=== SWPL 1 ===
==== Regular season ====
Pos	Team	Pld	W	D	L	GF	GA	GD	Pts	Qualification or relegation
1	Glasgow City	22	20	2	0	94	7	+87	62	Qualification for the Top six
2	Celtic	22	18	2	2	90	4	+86	56	Qualification for the Top six
3	Rangers	22	17	4	1	89	5	+84	55	Qualification for the Top six
4	Heart of Midlothian	22	12	4	6	33	19	+14	40	Qualification for the Top six
5	Hibernian	22	9	5	8	45	34	+11	32	Qualification for the Top six
6	Partick Thistle	22	9	4	9	37	50	−13	31	Qualification for the Top six
7	Motherwell	22	8	6	8	28	39	−11	30	Qualification for the Bottom six
8	Spartans	22	7	5	10	19	38	−19	26	Qualification for the Bottom six
9	Dundee United	22	5	2	15	21	61	−40	17	Qualification for the Bottom six
10	Aberdeen	22	4	3	15	20	56	−36	15	Qualification for the Bottom six
11	Hamilton Academical	22	4	1	17	20	74	−54	13	Qualification for the Bottom six
12	Glasgow Women	22	0	0	22	6	115	−109	0	Qualification for the Bottom six

Rules for classification: 1) Points; 2) Goal difference; 3) Number of goals scored

==== Top six ====
Pos	Team	Pld	W	D	L	GF	GA	GD	Pts	Qualification or relegation
1	Glasgow City (C)	32	27	2	3	112	18	+94	83	Qualification for the Champions League first round
2	Celtic	32	26	3	3	115	11	+104	81	Qualification for the Champions League first round
3	Rangers	32	24	6	2	111	9	+102	78	
4	Heart of Midlothian	32	14	7	11	39	42	−3	49	
5	Hibernian	32	11	6	15	54	51	+3	39	
6	Partick Thistle	32	9	5	18	42	73	−31	32	

Rules for classification: 1) Points; 2) Goal difference; 3) Number of goals scored
(C) Champions

==== Bottom six ====
Pos	Team	Pld	W	D	L	GF	GA	GD	Pts	Qualification or relegation
7	Spartans	32	16	6	10	48	51	−3	54	
8	Motherwell	32	13	8	11	52	53	−1	47	
9	Aberdeen	32	9	3	20	39	77	−38	30	
10	Dundee United	32	8	5	19	45	76	−31	29	
11	Hamilton Academical (Q)	32	8	3	21	38	93	−55	27	Qualification for the SWPL1 relegation/promotion play-off
12	Glasgow Women (R)	32	0	0	32	9	150	−141	0	Relegation to SWPL2

Rules for classification: 1) Points; 2) Goal difference; 3) Number of goals scored
(Q) Qualified for the phase indicated; (R) Relegated

=== League honours ===
Division	Winner
2022–23 SWPL 1	Glasgow City
2022–23 SWPL 2	Montrose
2022–23 SWF Championship	Livingston
2022–23 SWF League One	FC Edinburgh
2022 Scottish Women's Football League North/East	
2022 Scottish Women's Football League West/South West	
2022 Scottish Women's Football League Central/South East	
2022 Highlands and Islands League	Buckie

=== Cup honours ===
Competition	Winner	Score	Runner-up	Match report
2022–23 Scottish Women's Cup	Celtic	2–0	Rangers	BBC Sport
2022–23 Scottish Women's Premier League Cup	Rangers	2–0	Hibernian	Football Scotland
SWF Championship Cup	FC Edinburgh	0–0 (Note: After extra time; FC Edinburgh won 5–4 in penalty shootout.)	Dryburgh Athletic	
SWFL Cup	Harmony Row	3–2	Linlithgow Rose	
Highlands and Islands League Cup	Buckie	2–2 a.e.t. (3–1 pen)	Sutherland	scotwomenfootball

=== Individual honours ===
Award	Winner	Team
Players' Player of the Year	Caitlin Hayes	Celtic
Players' Young Player of the Year	Emma Watson	Rangers

=== UEFA Women's Champions League ===
Rangers and Glasgow City qualified for the Women's Champions League.

==== Rangers ====
18 August 2022 QR1	Ferencváros (Hungary)	1–3	(Scotland) Rangers	Katerini
	Fishley 69'	Report	Danielsson 14' (pen.); Cornet 48'; Hay 89'	Stadium: Katerini Stadium; Referee: Jurgita Mačikunytė (Lithuania)

21 August 2022 QR1	PAOK (Greece)	0–4	(Scotland) Rangers	Katerini
		Report	Docherty 50'; Davison 58'; Papaioannou 70' (o.g.); Arnot 86'	Stadium: Katerini Stadium; Attendance: 200; Referee: Alina Peşu (Romania)

20 September 2022 QR2	Rangers (Scotland)	2–3	(Portugal) Benfica	Glasgow
	McCoy 25', 58'	Report	Vitória 38', 56'; Esson 78' (o.g.)	Stadium: Ibrox Stadium; Attendance: 3,522; Referee: Ivana Martinčić (Croatia)

28 September 2022 QR2	Benfica (Portugal)	2–1 (a.e.t.) (5–3 agg.)	(Scotland) Rangers	Seixal
	Lacasse 93'; Silva 119'	Report	Watson 87'	Stadium: Futebol Campus; Attendance: 973; Referee: Marina Živković (Serbia)

==== Glasgow City ====
18 August 2022 QR1	Glasgow City (Scotland)	1–3	(Italy) Roma	Glasgow
		Report		Stadium: Petershill Park; Referee: Ainara Acevedo (Spain)

21 August 2022 QR1	Servette (Switzerland)	1–0	(Scotland) Glasgow City	Glasgow
	Korhonen 90+2'	Report		Stadium: Petershill Park; Attendance: 162; Referee: Frida Mia Klarlund (Denmark)

=== Scotland women's national team ===
2 September 2022 Friendly	Netherlands	2–1	Scotland	Zwolle
	Miedema 11'; Kalma 88'	Report	Emslie 12'	Stadium: MAC³PARK Stadion; Referee: Angelika Söder (Germany)

6 September 2022 2023 WCQ	Faroe Islands	0–6	Scotland	Tórshavn
		Report	Docherty 17'; Weir 40'; Cuthbert 45'; Thomas 45+1'; Corsie 53'; Beattie 68'	Stadium: Tórsvøllur; Referee: Katarzyna Lisiecka-sek (Poland)

6 October 2022 2023 WCQ	Scotland	1–0 (a.e.t.)	Austria	Glasgow
	Harrison 92'	Report		Stadium: Hampden Park; Attendance: 10,182; Referee: Jana Adámková (Czech Republic)

11 October 2022 2023 WCQ	Scotland	0–1	Republic of Ireland	Glasgow
		Report	Barrett 72'	Stadium: Hampden Park; Attendance: 10,708; Referee: Esther Staubli (Switzerland)

14 November 2022 Friendly	Scotland	2–1	Venezuela	Arcos de la Frontera
	Clark 36'; Emslie 40'	Report	Castellanos 59'	Stadium: Estadio Antonio Bardillo; Referee: Zulema González González (Spain)

15 February 2023 Pinatar Cup	Iceland	2–0	Scotland	San Pedro del Pinatar
	Kristinsdóttir 50', 51'	Report		Stadium: Pinatar Arena; Referee: Zuzana Valentová (Slovakia)

18 February 2023 Pinatar Cup	Scotland	2–1	Philippines	San Pedro del Pinatar
	Davidson 39'; Corsie 57'	Report	Serrano 90'	Stadium: Pinatar Arena; Referee: Zuzana Valentová (Slovakia)

21 February 2023 Pinatar Cup	Scotland	1–1	Wales	San Pedro del Pinatar
	Howard 8'	Report	Holland 42'	Stadium: Pinatar Arena; Referee: Lucie Sulcova (Czechia)

7 April 2023 Friendly	Australia	0–1	Scotland	London
		Report	Docherty 46'	Stadium: Plough Lane; Referee: Louise Thompson (Northern Ireland)

11 April 2023 Friendly	Scotland	4–0	Costa Rica	Glasgow
	Watson 5', 66'; Alvarado 28' (o.g.); Weir 37'	Report		Stadium: Hampden Park; Referee: Kirsty Dowle (England)

== Deaths ==
- 1 July: Drew Busby, 74, Third Lanark, Partick Thistle, Airdrieonians, Heart of Midlothian, Morton and Queen of the South forward; Queen of the South manager.
- 2 July: Andy Goram, 58, Hibernian, Rangers, Motherwell, Hamilton Academical, Queen of the South, Elgin City and Scotland goalkeeper.
- 8 July: Harry Mowbray, 75, Cowdenbeath and St Mirren defender.
- 9 July: Davie Robb, 74, Aberdeen, Dunfermline Athletic and Scotland forward.
- 9 July: Adam Strachan, 35, Partick Thistle, Ross County, Clyde, Arbroath, Dumbarton and Albion Rovers midfielder.
- 10 July: Ken Armstrong, 63, Kilmarnock defender.
- 1 August: John Hughes, 79, Celtic and Scotland forward; Stranraer manager.
- 11 August: Pat Liney, 86, Dundee and St Mirren goalkeeper.
- August: Billy Hodgson, 87, St Johnstone and Hamilton Academical outside-right.
- 8 September: Dave Smith, Dundee manager.
- 11 September: Chris Robinson, 71, Heart of Midlothian chairman and chief executive.
- 12 September: Ken Brownlee, 87, Aberdeen, Third Lanark and St Johnstone wing half.
- 25 September: Roy MacLaren, 92, St Johnstone goalkeeper.
- 8 October: John Duncan, 73, Dundee forward.
- 20 October: Jimmy Millar, 87, Dunfermline Athletic, Rangers, Dundee United and Scotland forward; Raith Rovers manager.
- 30 October: Sammy Wilson, 85, Falkirk and Dundee forward.
- 15 November: Jimmy O'Rourke, 76, Hibernian, St Johnstone and Motherwell forward.
- 20 November: Norrie Davidson, 88, Aberdeen, Heart of Midlothian, Dundee United, Partick Thistle and St Mirren forward.
- c.29 November: Alex Lamond, St Johnstone chairman.
- 14 December: Alex Duchart, 89, Hibernian, Third Lanark, East Fife, Dumbarton and Falkirk winger.
- c.14 December: Jim Boyd, 66, Clyde and Motherwell defender.
- 1 January: Frank McGarvey, 66, St Mirren, Celtic, Queen of the South, Clyde and Scotland forward; Queen of the South manager.
- January: Andy Graham, 66, Dundee United, Forfar Athletic, Raith Rovers, Stirling Albion and Kilmarnock goalkeeper.
- 23 January: Patrizio Billio, 48, Dundee and Aberdeen midfielder.
- 6 February: Billy Thomson, 64, Partick Thistle, St Mirren, Dundee United, Clydebank, Motherwell, Rangers, Dundee and Scotland goalkeeper.
- 21 February: Ron Gordon, 68, Hibernian chairman.
- 1 March: Allan McGraw, 83, Morton and Hibernian forward; Morton manager.
- 14 March: Chris Shevlane, 80, Hearts, Celtic, Hibernian and Morton defender.
- 14 March: John Sweeney, 88, Dunfermline Athletic left-back.
- 21 March: Willie Bell, 85, Queen's Park and Scotland left-back.
- 13 April: Willie Callaghan, 56, Dunfermline, Cowdenbeath, Clyde, Albion Rovers, Montrose, Meadowbank Thistle, Livingston and Partick Thistle forward.
- c.16 April: Eddie Colquhoun, 78, Scotland centre-back.
- 11 May: Andy Provan, 79, St Mirren winger.
- 22 May: Hugh Strachan, 84, Motherwell, Greenock Morton, Kilmarnock and Partick Thistle defender.
- 24 May: Harry Gould, 74, Grade one referee.
- 10 June: Adrian Sprott, 61, Meadowbank Thistle, Hamilton Academical and Stenhousemuir player.
- 15 June: Gordon McQueen, 70, St Mirren and Scotland defender; Airdrieonians manager.
- 26 June: Craig Brown, 82, Rangers, Dundee and Falkirk wing half; Clyde, Scotland, Motherwell and Aberdeen manager.

== Retirements ==
- 18 June 2022: Paul Caddis, 34, former Scotland, Celtic and Dundee United defender.
- 22 June 2022: Jamie Ness, 31, former Rangers, Dundee and Forfar Athletic midfielder.
