= 2020–21 North Caledonian Football League =

North Caledonian Football League
- Season: 2020–21
- Dates: 17 October 2020 – 24 June 2021 (curtailed)
- Champions: Golspie Sutherland (League 1); Alness United (League 2)
- Matches: 58
- Goals: 240 (4.14 per match)
- Biggest home win: Loch Ness 11–1 Scourie; (17 October 2020)
- Biggest away win: Scourie 0–13 Alness United; (7 November 2020)
- Highest scoring: Scourie 0–13 Alness United; (7 November 2020)
- Longest winning run: 6 games: Alness United
- Longest unbeaten run: 9 games: Alness United
- Longest winless run: 10 games: Scourie
- Longest losing run: 10 games: Scourie

The 2020–21 North Caledonian Football League (known for sponsorship reasons as the Macleod & MacCallum North Caledonian League) was the 112th season of the North Caledonian Football League. The season began on 17 October 2020, following a delay caused by the suspension of football activity due to the COVID-19 pandemic. Due to no league title being awarded for 2019–20, Golspie Sutherland began the season as the defending champions.

In January, the league management committee decided to pause the league schedule due to new COVID-19 protection levels that had been introduced in the Highland region. A week later, the Scottish FA confirmed that football at all levels below the SPFL Championship had been suspended while restrictions were in place.

Only one cup competition, the North Caledonian Cup, was drawn and competed for during the season, however due to the suspension of football activities at the turn of the year, the competition was abandoned for 2020–21. On 6 April 2021, it was announced the league's remaining games would be played between 22 May and 26 June. On 24 June, the season's two remaining fixtures were cancelled due to an uptick of COVID-19 cases in the Highlands. Golspie Sutherland defended their league title, winning the league ahead of the final round of fixtures.

== Teams ==
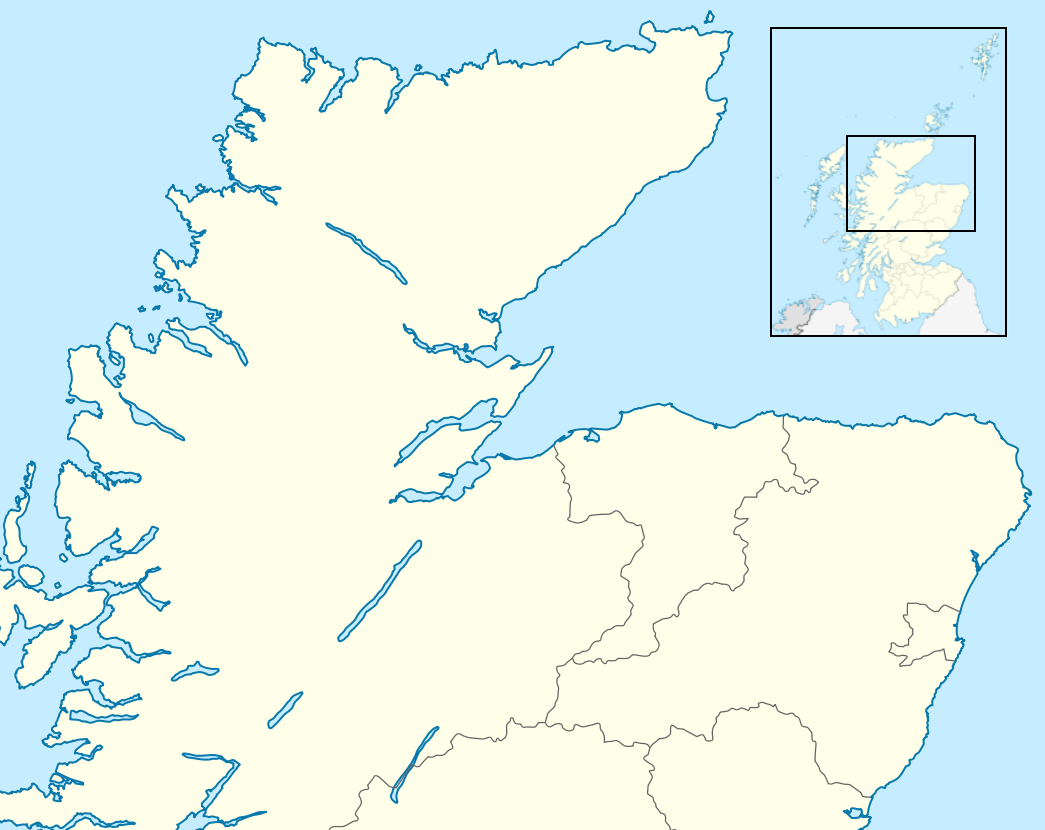
Location of teams in 2020–21 North Caledonian League

Alness United returned to competition following a one-year period of abeyance, while Bunillidh Thistle chose not play in the league for 2020–21 due to concerns related to playing and traveling during the virus outbreak. The league also welcomed Highland Football League club Nairn County's reserve team as a league member for the first time since the 1950s. Taking the competing numbers up to 12 for the 2020–21 season were new clubs Loch Ness and Scourie.

=== Stadia and locations ===
Team	Location	Home ground	Ref.
Alness United	Dingwall	Highland Football Academy	
Bonar Bridge	Bonar Bridge	Migdale Playing Fields	
Golspie Sutherland	Golspie	King George V Park	
Halkirk United	Halkirk	Morrison Park	
Invergordon	Invergordon	Recreation Grounds	
Inverness Athletic	Muir of Ord	Pavilion Park	
Loch Ness	Inverness	Canal Park, Inverness	
Nairn County A	Nairn	Riverside Park	
Orkney	Kirkwall	Kirkwall Grammar School 3G	
Scourie	Scourie	Achlochan Park	
St Duthus	Tain	Grant Park	
Thurso	Thurso	Sir George's Park	

=== Withdrew ===
Team	Location	Home ground	Ref.
Bunillidh Thistle	Helmsdale	Couper Park	

== Format ==
Following a meeting of clubs in August, it was agreed that for the 2020–21 season, the league would be temporarily split into two divisions of six teams – one for the North Caledonian League championship (League 1) and the other for the resurrected Ness Cup trophy (League 2). It was agreed that this change would be for the 2020–21 season only and that it would revert to a one division format for 2021–22. Teams who placed highest upon the suspension of football in the 2019–20 season were entered into League 1, while the remaining teams were joined by the league's new and returning entrants in League 2.

== League tables ==
=== League 1 ===
Pos	Team	Pld	W	D	L	GF	GA	GD	Pts
1	Golspie Sutherland (C)	9	6	1	2	19	9	+10	19
2	Invergordon	9	4	3	2	14	10	+4	15
3	St Duthus	10	4	3	3	21	19	+2	15
4	Thurso (Note: Thurso were deducted 4 points for fielding an ineligible player in their matches against Halkirk United (22 May) and Orkney (29 May).)	9	4	3	2	16	16	0	11
5	Orkney (Note: Orkney were awarded 5 points due to their opposition fielding ineligible players on 29 May (Thurso) and 5 June (Halkirk United).)	9	0	3	6	12	20	−8	8
6	Halkirk United (Note: Halkirk United were deducted 3 points for fielding an ineligible player in their 5 June match against Orkney.)	10	3	1	6	13	21	−8	7

Source: North Caledonian Football League
Rules for classification: 1) Points; 2) Goal difference; 3) Number of goals scored.
(C) Champions

=== League 2 ===
Pos	Team	Pld	W	D	L	GF	GA	GD	Pts
1	Alness United (C)	10	8	1	1	46	11	+35	25
2	Nairn County A	10	7	0	3	32	21	+11	21
3	Inverness Athletic	10	5	2	3	20	10	+10	17
4	Loch Ness	10	4	3	3	30	17	+13	15
5	Bonar Bridge	10	3	0	7	14	37	−23	9
6	Scourie	10	0	0	10	3	49	−46	0

Source: North Caledonian Football League
Rules for classification: 1) Points; 2) Goal difference; 3) Number of goals scored.
(C) Champions
