= Inverness Welfare League =

- Founded: 2026
- Country: Scotland
- Confederation: UEFA
- Divisions: 1
- Number of clubs: 5
- Current champions: Gilham Flooring (1st title)
- Most championships: Gilham Flooring (1 title)

The Inverness Welfare League is an amateur football league in the Scottish city of Inverness, with all games being played at Bught Park.

In plans drawn up in December 2025, it was announced that a speculated 8 teams from the Inverness and District FA's Second and Third tiers would form a breakaway league due to the gulf in quality between the Premier Division and First Division, that saw multiple teams "folding" and starting over in the Second Division.

As a result of this breakaway league forming, it was announced that none of the clubs competing in the Welfare League would be eligible for the Highland Amateur Cup.

The founding members of the league were IDFA defectors; Auctioneers, Gilham Flooring, Glen Urquhart, Kirkhill; and new team, Scorguie United. While it was expected to be a league of 8 teams, Culloden United, G16 United, Highland Athletic, and Slackbuie Rovers all backtracked on their defection, and remained in the Inverness and District FA, leading to the Welfare League to press ahead with a 5 team setup.

== Teams ==
Teams participating in the 2026 season:

- Auctioneers
- Gilham Flooring
- Glen Urquhart
- Kirkhill
- Scorguie United

== Champions ==
Season	Club
2026	Gilham Flooring
