= Ross-shire Welfare Football Association =

Recreational football league

The Ross-shire Welfare Football Association is a recreational football league operating in the Highlands of Scotland, affiliated to the Scottish Welfare Football Association and the Scottish Football Association.

Although another association by the same name was originally formed in the late 1950s / early 1960s, the current incarnation was formed in 1982 by James Patullo.

In 2019, with club member numbers dwindling, a switch to amateur status was proposed and seconded by all clubs.

== Member clubs ==
Four member clubs registered with the Ross-shire Welfare FA for the 2018 season.

Team	Location	Home ground	Ref.
Balintore Welfare F.C.	Balintore	Seaboard Park	
Eastern Rose F.C.	Portmahomack	Portmahomack Park	
Invergordon Social Club F.C.	Invergordon	Recreation Grounds	
Tarbat Ness F.C.	Portmahomack	Portmahomack Park	

Former member clubs include Alness Athletic, Alness United, Aquascot, Black Rock Rovers, BT Manpower / ClientLogic, Contin, Cromarty, Dalmore, Dingwall, Dingwall Vertex, Easter Ross Rovers, Fortrose & Rosemarkie Union, Inver, Invergordon Distillery Ltd, Maitlands Bar, Morven, Pockets, Portmahomack, Railway Hotel, Rigger, Ross-shire Club, Rugby Club, Stags, Tain Thistle, Tain United, Westpoint, Wheel Inn and 3G's.

== Champions ==
Year	Winner	Runners-up
2018	Balintore Welfare F.C.	Invergordon Social Club F.C.
2017	Tain Thistle F.C.	Alness United Welfare F.C.
2016	Tain Thistle F.C.	Contin F.C.
2015	Tain Thistle F.C.	Contin F.C.
2014	Alness Athletic F.C.	Fortrose & Rosemarkie Union F.C.
2013	Tain Thistle F.C.	Alness Athletic F.C.
2012	Alness Athletic F.C.	Cromarty F.C.
2011	Invergordon Social Club F.C.	Alness Athletic F.C.
2010	Balintore Welfare F.C.	Alness Athletic F.C.
2009	Tain Thistle F.C.	Ross-shire Club F.C.
2008	Black Rock Rovers F.C.	Tain Thistle F.C.
2007	Invergordon Social Club F.C.	Balintore Welfare F.C.
2006	Balintore Welfare F.C.	3G's F.C.
2005	Invergordon Social Club F.C.	Tain Thistle F.C.
2004	Balintore Welfare F.C.	Invergordon Distillery Ltd F.C.
2003	Invergordon Distillery Ltd F.C.	Inver F.C.
2002	Inver F.C.	Invergordon Social Club F.C.
2001	Invergordon Social Club F.C.	Invergordon Distillery Ltd F.C.
2000	Inver F.C.	Invergordon Social Club F.C.
1999	Invergordon Social Club F.C.	Pockets F.C.
1998	Pockets F.C.	Railway Hotel F.C.
1997	Morven F.C.	Invergordon Social Club F.C.
