= Caithness Amateur Football Association =

Scottish football league

- Country: Scotland
- Confederation: UEFA
- Divisions: 2
- Number of clubs: 15
- Level on pyramid: N/A
- Promotion to: None
- Relegation to: None
- Domestic cup: Highland Amateur Cup
- Website: Official website

The Caithness Amateur Football Association (CAFA) is a football (soccer) league competition for amateur clubs in the Caithness area of Scotland. The association is affiliated to the Scottish Amateur Football Association. Like several other Highland and island leagues, fixtures are played over the summer rather than the traditional winter calendar.

The association is composed of 15 clubs in two divisions.

== League membership ==
In order to join the association, clubs need to apply and are then voted in by current member clubs.

== 2025 league members ==
=== Division 1 ===
- Castletown
- High Ormlie Hotspur
- John O’ Groats
- Keiss
- Lybster
- Pentland United
- Staxigoe United
- Wick Groats

=== Division 2 ===
- Halkirk
- Thurso Academicals
- Thurso Pentland
- Thurso Swifts
- Top Joe's
- Watten
- Wick Thistle

== Champions ==
This list is incomplete; you can help by adding missing items with reliable sources.

Season	Division 1	Division 2
1988	Pentland United	Thurso Swifts
1989	Castletown	Wick Thistle
1990	Pentland United	Wick Rovers
1991	Pentland United	Holborn
1992	Wick Thistle	Watten
1993	Pentland United	Shillinghill
1994	Holborn	Keiss
1995	Wick Groats	Shillinghill
1996	Pentland United	Lybster Portland
1997	Pentland United	Thurso Academicals
1998	Pentland United	Castletown
1999	Pentland United	Wick Rovers
2000	Pentland United	Halkirk
2001	Pentland United	John o' Groats
2002	Wick Thistle	Dounreay Workshops
2003	Pentland United	Thurso Pentland
2004	Pentland United	Wick Groats
2005	Thurso Academicals	Thurso Swifts
2006	Pentland United	Thurso Pentland
2007	Castletown	Wick Groats
2008	Pentland United	Thurso Pentland
2009	Wick Groats	Francis Street Club
2010	Wick Groats	Thurso Academicals
2011	Pentland United	Wick Thistle
2012	Wick Groats	Thurso Pentland
2013	Wick Groats	Castletown
2014	Wick Groats	Wick Thistle
2015	Wick Groats	Castletown
2016	Wick Groats	Wick Thistle
2017	Wick Groats	Lybster
2018	Wick Groats	Castletown
2019	Wick Groats	Wick Thistle
2020	Wick Groats	
2021	cancelled	
2022	Pentland United	Castletown
2023	Wick Groats	Lybster
2024	Pentland United	Keiss
