= TTFC =

TTFC can refer to one of the following football clubs:

- Tai'an Tiankuang F.C.
- Tain Thistle F.C.
- Talgarth Town F.C.
- Taunton Town F.C.
- Tetbury Town F.C.
- Thamesmead Town F.C.
- Thatcham Town F.C.
- Thetford Town F.C.
- Thrapston Town F.C.
- Tipton Town F.C.
- Tiverton Town F.C.
- Trowbridge Town F.C.
- Tullamore Town F.C.
