= Bishopmill United F.C. =

Association football club in Scotland

Bishopmill United
- Full name: Bishopmill United Football Club
- Nickname: Bish
- Founded: 1882
- Dissolved: 2013
- Ground: Pinefield, Elgin
- 2011–12: SJFA North Division Two; 7th

Bishopmill United Football Club were a Scottish football club from Elgin, Moray.

== History ==
The first Bishopmill Football Club was formed in 1886, with Bishopmill United started life in 1906. The club joined the Morayshire Junior League for its second season 1906–07. The club was wound up in 2013.

== Colours ==
The club wore white and black.

== Ground ==
The club's last ground was at Pinefield, alongside local rivals New Elgin, after its previous ground at Deanshaugh was rendered unusable after remedial works.

== League career ==
Morayshire Junior League: 1906–1914; 1920–1928; 1932–1935; 1946–1968

North Region (North) Section: 1969–2001

North Region, Division One: (West) 2001–2003

North Region, Division Two: 2003–2009

North Region, Division One: 2009–2011

North Region, Division Two: 2011–2013 (Withdrew during 2012–13 season)

== Honours ==
- North Region (North) League champions: 1980–81
- Morayshire Junior League champions: 1910–11, 1911–12, 1912–13, 1913–14, 1923–24
- Gordon Williamson Cup: 1977–78, 1988–89
- Matthew Cup: 1909–10, 1910–11, 1911–12, 1912–13, 1950–51, 1973–74, 1976–77, 1988–89
- Morayshire Junior Cup: 1948–49, 1962–63, 1963–64, 1978–79, 1988–89
- Nicholson Cup: 1911–12, 1923–24, 1934–35, 1977–78, 1978–79, 1990–91
- Tom Gordon Trophy: 1977–78, 1979–80, 1991–92
- Robertson Cup: 1963–64, 1978–79, 1981–82
- North of Scotland (Morayshire) Cup: 1949–50, 1963–64, 1979–80
- North of Scotland Junior Cup: 1911-12, 1912-13
- Connon Cup: 1951–52, 1959–60, 1962–63, 1975–76, 1977–78, 1983–84, 1990–91, 1994–95
- White Horse Cup: 1949–50, 1951–52, 1963–64
- Scottish Junior Cup (Best Season) 4th Round, 1963–64
