= Paul Greig =

Scottish football manager

Personal information
- Full name: Paul Greig
- Place of birth: Scotland

Managerial career
- Years: Team
- Northern Football
- 2016–2017: NJ/NY Gotham (assistant)
- 2018: Spartans
- 2024–2025: Livingston

Paul Greig is a Scottish football manager who most recently managed Livingston.

== Early life ==
He attended Balwearie High School.

== Career ==
Greig guided Northern Football to the New Zealand Women's National League championship in 2015.

In February 2016, he was appointed assistant manager of NJ/NY Gotham.

He was appointed manager of Spartans in February 2018. However, after 6 months in charge, Greig stepped down from his position to take up a coaching role with Spartans men’s under-20 side.

In February 2020, Greig was appointed as development manager for Raith Rovers Community Foundation. During his tenure, the RRCF was named Best Professional Club in the Community at the 2021 Scottish Football Association Grassroots Awards.

Greig was appointed as first team head coach of Livingston in April 2024. He left the role in January 2025, citing work commitment issues.

== Honours ==
=== Manager ===
Northern Football

- New Zealand Women's National League winner: 2014-2015
