= Scottish Junior Football North Division Two =

- Founded: 2003
- Folded: 2013
- Country: Scotland
- Promotion to: North Division One
- Relegation to: no relegation
- Domestic cup(s): Scottish Junior Cup
- Last champions: Colony Park (2012–13)
- Website: SJFA North Region

The Scottish Junior Football North Division Two was a third-tier division of the North Region of the Scottish Junior Football Association from 2003.

After the withdrawal of several clubs, including Dufftown, RAF Lossiemouth and Bishopmill United, the division was left with six clubs by the end of the 2012–13 season. The decision was taken at the 2013 Regional AGM to create two parallel Division One leagues distributed geographically and split existing Division Two clubs between these.

After five seasons, the previous simple three-division setup was adopted once again, with the lowest tier being the Scottish Junior Football North Second Division.

== Champions ==
Year	Winner
2003–04	Islavale
2004–05	New Elgin
2005–06	New Elgin
2006–07	Fochabers
2007–08	Bishopmill United
2008–09	Inverness City
2009–10	Burghead Thistle
2010–11	Parkvale
2011–12	Portgordon Victoria
2012–13	Colony Park
