= Muir of Ord Rovers F.C. =

Association football club in Scotland

- Full name: Muir of Ord Rovers Football Club
- Nicknames: The Rovers; The Muir
- Founded: 1920s
- Ground: Pavilion Park, Muir of Ord
- Coordinates: 57°30′55″N 4°27′18″W
- League: Inverness and District Amateur League
Home colours	Away colours

Muir of Ord Rovers Football Club are a football team from the village of Muir of Ord in the Scottish Highlands, playing at Pavilion Park.

The club were formed some time in the 1920s, and play in a blue home kit, with their badge featuring the cupolas of the nearby Glen Ord Whisky distillery.

In 2007, The Rovers built a new club house at Pavilion Park, which provided the club with home and away dressing rooms.

Until 2014, the club competed in the North Caledonian Football League, before deciding to step down and join the Inverness and District Amateur Football League. They currently play in the IDFA Division One after gaining promotion from Division Two following a sixth-place finish in 2024.

== Honours ==
=== League ===
- North Caledonian League:
  - Winners (2): 1983–84, 1985–86

=== Cup ===
- North Caledonian Cup:
  - Winners (7): 1933–34, 1934–35, 1937–38, 1967–68, 1982–83, 2009–10, 2012–13
- Football Times Cup:
  - Winners (6): 1932–33, 1977–78, 1979–80, 2010–11, 2011–12
- Highland Amateur Cup:
  - Runners up (1): 1983
