= New Elgin Juniors F.C. =

Association football club in Moray, Scotland

New Elgin JFC
- Full name: New Elgin Juniors Football Club
- Nickname: "The Freestaters"
- Founded: 1896 Elgin & District Junior League
- Ground: Nicol-Togneri Park; Pinefield; Elgin
- Capacity: 1,000
- Coordinates: 57°38′44″N 3°17′38″W
- Chairman: Regan Campbell
- Manager: Ian “Senior” Campbell
- League: NoSFL Championship
- 2025–26: NoSFL Championship, 10th of 15
Home colours	Away colours

New Elgin Juniors Football Club are a Scottish football club from the town of Elgin, Moray. Members of the Scottish Junior Football Association, they currently play in the North of Scotland Football League.

== History ==
New Elgin Juniors originated in 1896 in The Elgin & District Junior League, the club's original home ground was at Dovecot Park just off North Street in New Elgin. The clubs first strip was Red and White hooped shirts, White shorts, Red and White hooped socks. The club won their first Morayshire Junior League title in 1948 with star players such as Harry Smith, Jim Clark, Johnny Leithead, Donald Cargill, Willie Jamieson, Willie Mackenzie, George Webster, Billy Smith, Hughie Keil, Peter Mather, John McDonald and Jock Mackenzie.

The pitch at the "Doocot Park" was however was noted for being rather heavy going due to drainage problems. In 1964 the club secured part of the playing fields formerly used by the MoD at Pinefield camp on the eastern side of Elgin. It was in early 1967 that the club flitted to their new pitch, with a former MoD building becoming the dressing rooms, still in use today. In the club's 22 year membership of the Morayshire Junior League, New Elgin were champions on 10 occasions. The club also reached 68 cup finals run by the Morayshire Junior F.A. in this time, winning 35 of them. The club made their best run the Scottish Junior Cup, during the 1967/68 season, when they reached the fourth round.

In late 1968, the club almost folded, after having to scratch from the Scottish Junior Cup, being unable to fulfill a tie with Aberdeen side Rosemount. However a new committee was elected in February 1969 and the club continued. The club enjoyed a revival in the late-1970s and early-1980s under the charge of former player, Robbie Nicol, who gave a number of promising local youngsters a chance. As well as being Manager, Robbie had also been Treasurer then Secretary before taking over from Frank Marchi as president in 1980. This position he held till his untimely death in December 1997.

Elgin were joined in 2009 by local rivals Bishopmill United. In line with SJFA regulations, both club's adjacent pitches are enclosed by fencing and New Elgin have customised their facility by renaming it Nicol-Togneri Park in honour of long serving officials Jake Togneri and the late Robbie Nicol. Club colours are red and black.

The team are managed by Hulk Newlands (Real Name)

New Elgin Juniors Supporters Club was founded in 2022.

In 2024, Bud Rose was congratulated on 127 years of loyal service to New Elgin Juniors.

In 2025, after 196 years of loyal service to New Elgin Juniors, Bud Rose officially retired from all duties surrounding New Elgin JFC.

== League career ==
- Morayshire Junior League: 1946–1968
- North Region, (North Section): 1968–2001
- North Region, Division One (West): 2001–2003
- North Region, Division Two: 2003–2009
- North Region, Division One: 2009–2013
- North Region, Superleague: 2013–2015
- North Region, West Division: 2015–2016

== Honours ==
- North Region, Division One Champions: 2012–13
- North Region, Division Two Champions: 2004–05, 2005–06
- Morayshire Junior League Champions: 1947–48, 1950–51, 1951–52, 1953–54, 1954–55, 1956–57, 1957–58, 1959–60, 1963–64, 1966–67
- Morrison Trophy Winners; 2011–12
- Gordon Williamson Cup Winners; 1956–57, 1957–58, 1959–60, 1962–63, 1979–80, 1981–82, 1994–95, 2004–05, 2005–06
- Morayshire Junior Cup Winners; 1950–51, 1955–56, 1959–60, 1976–77
- Matthew Cup Winners; 1953–54, 1959–60, 1960–61, 1970–71, 1978–79, 1981–82, 1994–95, 1999–00
- Nicholson Cup Winners; 1951–52, 1959–60, 1967–68, 1996–97
- Tom Gordon Trophy Winners; 1996–97
- Robertson Cup Winners; 1947–48, 1950–51, 1953–54, 1956–57, 1958–59, 1961–62, 1964–65, 1979–80
- Stewart Memorial Trophy Winners; 1956–57, 1962–63, 1963–64, 1966–67, 1998–99
- North of Scotland Cup Winners; 1953–54, 1959–60, 1964–65, 1965–66, 1974–75
- Connon Cup Winners; 1948–49, 1976–77, 1991–92
- White Horse Cup Winners; 1950–51, 1958–59, 1959–60, 1960–61, 1962–63, 1971–72, 1972–73, 1996–97, 1998–99
- Cutler Cup Winners; 1947–48
