= 2022–23 Midlands Football League =

Scottish football league season

Midlands Football League
- Season: 2022–23
- Dates: 23 July 2022 - 27 May 2023
- Champions: Carnoustie Panmure
- Matches: 342
- Goals: 1,414 (4.13 per match)
- Biggest home win: Downfield 9–0 Forfar West End (4 March 2023)
- Biggest away win: Lochee Harp 1–10 East Craigie (3 September 2022); Forfar West End 0–9 Broughty Athletic (25 March 2023)
- Highest scoring: Dundee North End 11–3 Scone Thistle (12 November 2022)
- Longest winning run: 11 matches: Downfield
- Longest unbeaten run: 20 matches: Downfield
- Longest winless run: 22 matches: Forfar West End
- Longest losing run: 21 matches: Forfar West End
- All statistics correct as of 27 May 2023.

The 2022–23 Midlands Football League was the second season of the Midlands Football League, part of the sixth tier of the Scottish football pyramid system. Reigning champions Carnoustie Panmure defended their title, taking the championship win on the final day of the season with an 8–1 win over Blairgowrie; they finished three points clear of Broughty Athletic.

== Teams ==
Location of teams in 2022-23 Midlands Football League
Location of teams in 2022–23 Midlands Football League within Dundee
Location of teams in 2022–23 Midlands Football League within Angus and Fife

=== Stadia and locations ===
Club	Location	Home Ground	Capacity	Seats	Floodlit
Arbroath Victoria	Arbroath	Ogilvy Park	4,000	0	Yes
Blairgowrie	Blairgowrie	Davie Park	2,500	0	Yes
Brechin Victoria	Brechin	Victoria Park	600	100	Yes
Broughty Athletic	Dundee	Whitton Park	2,500	0	Yes
Carnoustie Panmure	Carnoustie	Laing Park	1,500	0	No
Coupar Angus	Coupar Angus	Foxhall Park	1,800	0	Yes
Downfield	Dundee	Downfield Park	2,500	13	Yes
Dundee North End	Dundee	North End Park	2,000	0	Yes
Dundee St James	Dundee	Fairfield Park	TBC	0	No
Dundee Violet	Dundee	Glenesk Park	2,000	0	No
East Craigie	Dundee	Craigie Park	3,300	0	No
Forfar United	Forfar	Guthrie Park	2,500	0	No
Forfar West End	Forfar	Strathmore Park	2,500	0	No
Kirriemuir Thistle	Kirriemuir	Westview Park	2,000	32	Yes
Letham	Perth	Seven Acres Park	TBC	0	Yes
Lochee Harp	Dundee	Lochee Community Sports Hub	TBC	0	Yes
Lochee United ^{[SFA]}	Dundee	Thomson Park	3,200	0	Yes
Scone Thistle	Scone	Farquharson Park	1,000	0	No
Tayport ^{[SFA]}	Tayport	Canniepairt	2,000	0	Yes

== League table ==
Pos	Team	Pld	W	D	L	GF	GA	GD	Pts	Qualification
1	Carnoustie Panmure (C)	36	28	4	4	131	33	+98	88	Ineligible for the Highland League play-off
2	Broughty Athletic	36	27	4	5	121	34	+87	85	
3	Downfield	36	26	4	6	104	41	+63	82	
4	Lochee United	36	25	6	5	112	45	+67	81	
5	Dundee North End	36	24	4	8	97	43	+54	76	
6	East Craigie	36	23	6	7	94	44	+50	75	
7	Kirriemuir Thistle	36	20	9	7	102	65	+37	69	
8	Tayport	36	19	3	14	74	58	+16	60	
9	Letham	36	15	8	13	64	56	+8	53	
10	Arbroath Victoria	36	12	7	17	57	73	−16	43	
11	Forfar United	36	12	6	18	61	95	−34	42	
12	Dundee Violet	36	11	6	19	65	102	−37	39	
13	Coupar Angus	36	10	5	21	58	91	−33	35	
14	Scone Thistle	36	10	5	21	50	96	−46	35	
15	Dundee St James	36	8	7	21	47	99	−52	31	
16	Blairgowrie	36	7	4	25	48	114	−66	25	
17	Lochee Harp	36	5	5	26	57	108	−51	20	
18	Brechin Victoria	36	4	7	25	36	94	−58	19	
19	Forfar West End	36	5	2	29	36	123	−87	17	

Rules for classification: 1) Points; 2) Goal difference; 3) Goals scored
(C) Champions

== Results ==
Home \ Away	ARB	BLA	BRE	BRO	CAR	COU	DOW	DNE	DUV	ECR	FUN	FWE	KIR	LET	LHA	LOU	SCO	DSJ	TAY
Arbroath Victoria	—	5–1	1–2	0–2	2–3	0–1	1–2	1–6	1–4	0–3	1–2	2–2	2–1	0–1	2–0	0–0	3–0	4–1	2–2
Blairgowrie	2–2	—	1–1	0–7	0–5	1–4	3–3	0–5	0–2	1–6	2–0	0–1	0–2	1–1	2–4	1–5	0–3 (Note: Match initially finished 3–2 to Blairgowrie, but was later awarded 3–0 to Scone Thistle as Blairgowrie fielded an ineligible player.)	3–1	0–2
Brechin Victoria	0–4	0–3	—	0–3	0–5	2–2 (Note: Match played at Glebe Park, Brechin.)	0–1	1–2	1–1	0–3	1–3	5–1	2–4	1–2	2–2	0–5	3–3	1–2	1–3
Broughty Athletic	8–0	6–0	4–0	—	4–1	1–1	3–1	1–3	2–0	1–2	5–0	5–0	3–2	1–1	4–1	5–3	5–2	5–0	2–0
Carnoustie Panmure	5–0	8–1	6–2	3–2	—	3–0 (Note: Match awarded 3–0 to Carnoustie Panmure, as Coupar Angus were unable to field a team.)	0–1	4–0	3–2	3–0	5–1	4–1	3–0	2–0	4–1	1–2	5–1	4–0	4–2
Coupar Angus	2–3	0–3	2–2	1–2	1–3	—	0–2	1–3	2–4	4–2	4–1	4–1	2–2	2–3	2–1	1–4	2–4	5–1	0–2
Downfield	4–2	4–0	5–2	3–1	1–1	2–0	—	1–2	3–1	2–1	2–4	9–0	2–3	3–1	2–1	0–0	3–1	1–1	1–3
Dundee North End	0–0	4–3	2–0	1–2	2–2	2–0	0–2	—	8–0	1–2	6–1	3–0	1–3	0–1	2–1	4–1	11–3	4–0	1–0
Dundee Violet	0–1	4–3	0–1	1–2	1–9	5–1	1–5	0–4	—	1–3	1–3	3–2	3–3	1–7	3–0	1–3	1–0	1–1	3–3
East Craigie	3–1	2–1	3–0	0–0	1–1	4–0	0–3	2–2	5–1	—	1–2	2–1	3–1	3–1	5–1	1–2	2–2	3–0	4–0
Forfar United	1–3	0–4	4–0	1–2	0–4	2–2	1–5	2–4	6–2 (Note: Match played at Station Park, Forfar.)	1–3	—	4–0	1–5	2–2	2–1	1–0	4–2	2–2	2–4
Forfar West End	2–3	1–5	2–0	0–9	0–6	3–2	3–4	1–2	2–1	3–3	1–3	—	2–5	1–2	2–1	1–2	0–1	1–3	0–3
Kirriemuir Thistle	4–2	3–2	2–1	4–0	0–0	4–1	1–0	1–2	8–3	2–2	2–2	4–0	—	2–2	2–1	0–4	3–1	3–1	4–1
Letham	0–1	4–1	2–1	0–5	0–3	7–0	1–3	1–2	2–0	0–2	1–1	2–0	2–2	—	1–1	0–7	5–1	3–0	0–1
Lochee Harp	1–3	4–1	2–3	1–3	2–7	0–2	1–6	0–4	2–5	1–10	3–1	7–0	3–3	1–1	—	2–4	1–3	1–1	4–5
Lochee United	1–1	8–1	3–0	2–2	2–0	4–1	1–3	3–1	0–0	5–3	2–0 (Note: Match played at Station Park, Forfar.)	5–0	5–5	3–2	5–1	—	6–0	4–2	5–1
Scone Thistle	2–1	0–1	1–1	0–4	0–4	1–2	1–5	2–1	1–3	0–2	1–1	4–1	0–4	0–2	0–2	3–2	—	3–1	2–1
Dundee St James	2–2	2–1	4–0	0–7	1–7	2–3	0–6	0–0	3–4	0–2	4–0	1–0	3–6	1–4	3–1	1–3	2–2	—	0–3
Tayport	3–1	5–0	1–0	0–3	0–3	5–1	0–4	1–2	2–2	0–1	8–0	4–1	3–2	1–0	3–1	0–1	2–0	0–1	—

Legend: Blue = home team win; Yellow = draw; Red = away team win.

== Notes ==
^{SFA} Club with an SFA licence eligible to participate in the Highland League promotion play-off should they win the league.
