= North West Sutherland Amateur Football Association =

Scottish football league

- Founded: 1970
- Country: Scotland
- Confederation: UEFA
- Divisions: 1
- Number of clubs: 9
- Level on pyramid: N/A
- Promotion to: None
- Relegation to: None
- Domestic cup: Highland Amateur Cup
- Current champions: Golspie Stafford (2025)
- Website: nwsafa.weebly.com

The North West Sutherland Amateur Football Association (NWSAFA) is a football (soccer) league competition for amateur clubs in the Sutherland area of Scotland. The association is affiliated to the Scottish Amateur Football Association. Like several other Highland and island leagues, fixtures are played over the summer rather than the traditional winter calendar. The association is currently composed of 9 clubs.

== Member clubs ==
=== 2025 League members ===
- Brora Wanderers
- Embo
- Golspie Stafford
- Helmsdale United
- Inver
- Lairg Rovers
- Lochinver
- Melvich
- Tain Thistle

== Champions ==
=== North West Sutherland Football League ===
This list is incomplete; you can help by adding missing items with reliable sources.

Year	Champions	Ref
2023	Golspie Stafford	
2024	Tain Thistle	
2025	Golspie Stafford	
