= Tain Thistle F.C. =

Association football club in Highland, Scotland

- Full name: Tain Thistle Football Club
- Nickname: The Jags
- Founded: 1997
- Ground: Links Park, Tain
- Coordinates: 57°48′59″N 4°3′17″W
- Chairman: Niall Harkiss
- Manager: Alex McDonald
- League: North West Sutherland Amateur League
Home colours	Away colours

Tain Thistle Football Club is an amateur football club playing in the North West Sutherland Amateur Football League in Scotland. They play at Links Park in the town of Tain in the Scottish Highlands.

The club was formed in 1997, and originally joined the Ross-shire Welfare League that same year. They remained as members of the Ross-shire Welfare until 2018 when they tendered their resignation in favour of moving to the amateur ranks of the North West Sutherland Amateur Football Association.

The club was briefly accepted into the senior North Caledonian League in June 2008 and competed in league matches during the 2008–09 season, becoming the first Tain team to do so since the demise of Tain St Duthus four seasons earlier. In 2009–10, Thistle competed in both league and cup competitions, but withdrew in 2010. While members of the North Caledonian League, Tain Thistle and their full squad also appeared in the multi-million selling game series, Football Manager 2009 and featured in several national newspapers for achieving the feat.

== Achievements ==
=== League ===
The club have played in the Ross-shire Welfare League since 1997, and while the club typically finished bottom of the league during its formative years, the club secured its first ever Ross-shire Welfare league title under Arron Christie in 2009, beating Invergordon Social Club on the final day to win by five clear points, ahead of rivals Ross-shire Club. They won the league title for a second time in 2013 under manager Gary Ross, and again in 2015 under Robert Ross. In 2017, under the management of Tony Farquhar, the Jags completed a quadruple haul of trophies, while also securing a third successive Ross-shire Welfare League championship, becoming the first team do so in over 30 years.

Leaving the Ross-shire Welfare League after 21 seasons in favour of a move to amateur status, Tain Thistle won the North West Sutherland Amateur League at the first time of asking in 2018. The Jags retained the trophy in 2019.

After the Covid-19 pandemic, Thistle entered a period of abeyance of three years before returning to the North West Sutherland Amateur League set up in 2023. In their first season they won the League 2 title, earning promotion to the top tier for season 2024. The secured their third amateur title at the first time of asking, recording their seventh division championship in 10 years.

=== Cups ===
The club won its first trophy in 2007 under the management of Arron Christie, defeating Ross-shire Club to lift the Pattisons' Challenge Cup.

In May 2011, Thistle lifted the Ross-shire Welfare League Cup for the first time, defeating Balintore 3–2 in the final. This result is described as Thistle's greatest performance to date having won after their goalkeeper was given his marching orders on 15-minutes. With no goalkeeper on the bench, it was right-back, Brian Cameron who volunteered to go between the sticks, despite not having played in goals since Primary School.

Since that time, Thistle have won every major cup which is competed for under the auspices of the Ross-shire Welfare Football Association. In 2012, the Jags also won the resurrected Mid-Ross Challenge Shield, finishing first in an autumn mini league competition.

Their only amateur cup success has come in the division top scorers playoff (the Polla Cup) in 2018.

== Honours ==
=== League ===
- North West Sutherland Amateur League (2): 2018, 2019, 2024
- Ross-shire Welfare Football League (5): 2009, 2013, 2015, 2016, 2017
- North West Sutherland Amateur League 2 (1): 2023

=== Cups ===
- Pattisons' Challenge Cup (2): 2007, 2017
- Cordiner Cup (4): 2009, 2015, 2016, 2017
- Seaboard Cup (4): 2012, 2015, 2016, 2017
- Coronation Cup (2): 2013, 2017
- Ross-shire Welfare League Cup (1): 2011
- Merrythought Cup (1): 2016
- Polla Cup (1): 2018
- Mid-Ross Challenge Shield (1): 2012

=== Other ===
- Charity Shield (4): 2009, 2013, 2016, 2017
- North West Sutherland Polla Cup (1): 2018
- Graham Jardine Memorial Quaich (2): 2014, 2017
- Homecoming Cup (1): 2009
- Christy Grant Memorial Trophy (1): 2009
- Tain Silver Cup (3): 2015, 2016, 2017

== Media coverage ==
The club generated a much higher level of media interest than usual during November 2008 as a result of their inclusion in Football Manager. The Club chairman was interviewed live on the subject by Peter Allen from BBC Radio 5 Live and also appeared on BBC Radio Scotland's morning news programme, Good Morning Scotland. Tain Thistle were also featured on BBC Scotland's flagship television news programme, Reporting Scotland.
