= Inverness and District Football Association =

- Country: Scotland
- Confederation: UEFA
- Divisions: 3
- Number of clubs: 26
- Domestic cup(s): Scottish Amateur Cup; Highland Amateur Cup
- Current champions: Maryburgh (2026)

The Macron Inverness and District Football Association runs amateur football mainly in the city of Inverness, in the Highlands of Scotland, but also in the surrounding towns and villages. They are affiliated to the Scottish Amateur Football Association.

The association runs three divisions with promotion and relegation, playing a summer season, in common with most amateur and welfare leagues in the North of Scotland.

In December 2025, it was announced that some of the Invernessian clubs in the 1st and 2nd Divisions would be forming the Inverness Welfare League, ahead of the 2026 season, due to the gulf between them and the teams in the Premier Division, resulting in teams "folding" and restarting in the 2nd Division to avoid promotion to the top tier. The teams defecting from the IDFA included Gilham Flooring, Auctioneers, Glen Urquhart and Kirkhill, as well as an additional defection from Culloden United, who initially joined the welfare league before moving to the IDFA.

== Current teams ==
Teams participating in the 2026 season:

=== Premiership ===
- Avoch
- Black Rock Rovers
- Culloden Blacksmiths
- Fortrose & Rosemarkie Union
- Inverness Athletic Reserves
- Loch Ness Thistle
- Maryburgh
- Tomatin United

=== Championship ===
- Ardersier
- Auldearn
- Culbokie
- Drakies L&L
- Ferry United
- Gellions
- Hill Rovers
- Muir of Ord Rovers

=== First Division ===
- Contin
- Culloden United
- G16 United
- Grahams Academical
- Highland Athletic
- Raigmore
- Slackbuie Rovers
- Tornagrain United

== Past winners ==
| Year | Premier Division | 1st Division | 2nd Division |
|---|---|---|---|
| 2017 | Avoch | Maryburgh | Contin |
| 2018 | Maryburgh | Bellmac | Ferrybache |
| 2019 | Maryburgh | IRN Security | Black Rock Rovers |
| 2020 | cancelled | | |
| 2021 | Loch Ness Reserves | Black Rock Rovers | Black Isle United |
| 2022 | Maryburgh | Inverness Athletic Reserves | Clachnacuddin Youth |
| 2023 | Maryburgh | Culloden Blacksmiths | Drakies |
| 2024 | Avoch | Black Rock Rovers | Culbokie |
| 2025 | Maryburgh | Tomatin United | Ferry United |
| 2026 | Maryburgh | Ardersier | Culloden United |
