= 2022–23 Highland Football League =

Breedon Highland League
- Season: 2022–23
- Dates: 23 July 2022 – 22 April 2023
- Champions: Brechin City
- Matches: 306
- Goals: 1,140 (3.73 per match)
- Biggest home win: Brechin City 10–0 Wick Academy (25 March 2023)
- Biggest away win: Strathspey Thistle 0–11 Brora Rangers (5 October 2022)
- Highest scoring: Strathspey Thistle 0–11 Brora Rangers (5 October 2022)
- Longest winning run: 8 matches: 3 teams
- Longest unbeaten run: 23 matches: Brechin City
- Longest winless run: 14 matches: Strathspey Thistle
- Longest losing run: 7 matches: 3 teams
- All statistics correct as of 22 April 2023.

The 2022–23 Highland Football League (known as the Breedon Highland League for sponsorship reasons) was the 120th season of the Highland Football League, and the 9th season as part of the fifth tier of the Scottish football pyramid system. Fraserburgh were the reigning champions.

The championship title was decided in the final round of fixtures with Buckie Thistle and Brechin City facing off against each other at Victoria Park. Brechin City won 2–0 – inflicting Buckie Thistle's first home league defeat since August 2019 – to win the league by two points.

Brechin City played the winners of the 2022–23 Lowland Football League (The Spartans) in the Pyramid play-off, losing on penalties after drawing 3–3 on aggregate.

== Teams ==
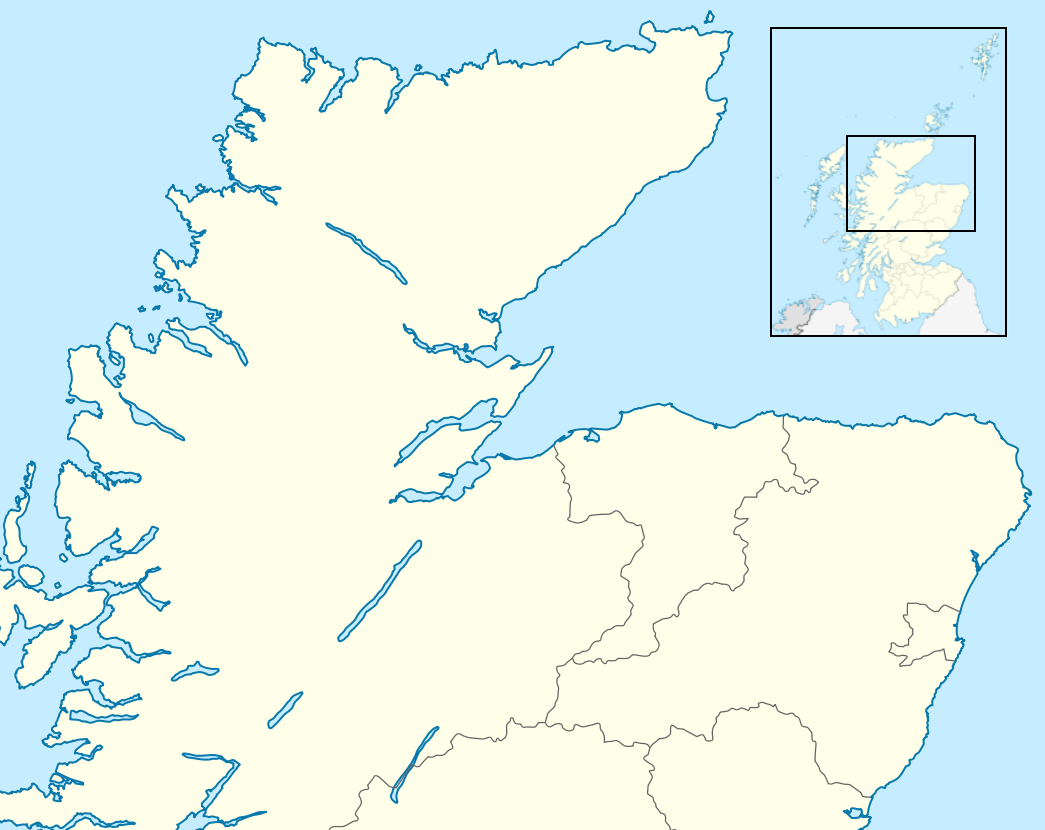
Location of teams in 2022-23 Highland Football League

Banks O' Dee joined having become the first club to be promoted into the Highland League, replacing Fort William whose 37-year stay in the division came to an end.

=== From Highland League ===
Relegated to North Caledonian League

- Fort William

=== To Highland League ===
Promoted from North Superleague

- Banks O' Dee

=== Stadia and locations ===
All grounds are equipped with floodlights as required by league regulations.

Team	Location	Stadium	Capacity	Seats
Banks O' Dee	Aberdeen	Spain Park	876	100
Brechin City	Brechin	Glebe Park	4,083	1,519
Brora Rangers	Brora	Dudgeon Park	4,000	200
Buckie Thistle	Buckie	Victoria Park	5,000	400
Clachnacuddin	Inverness	Grant Street Park	2,074	154
Deveronvale	Banff	Princess Royal Park	2,600	360
Formartine United	Pitmedden	North Lodge Park	2,500	300
Fraserburgh	Fraserburgh	Bellslea Park	3,000	480
Forres Mechanics	Forres	Mosset Park	2,700	502
Huntly	Huntly	Christie Park	2,200	270
Inverurie Loco Works	Inverurie	Harlaw Park	2,500	250
Keith	Keith	Kynoch Park	4,000	370
Lossiemouth	Lossiemouth	Grant Park	2,050	250
Nairn County	Nairn	Station Park	2,250	250
Rothes	Rothes	Mackessack Park	2,700	184
Strathspey Thistle	Grantown-on-Spey	Seafield Park	1,600	150
Turriff United	Turriff	The Haughs	2,135	135
Wick Academy	Wick	Harmsworth Park	2,412	102

== League table ==
Pos	Team	Pld	W	D	L	GF	GA	GD	Pts	Qualification or relegation
1	Brechin City (C)	34	28	5	1	101	16	+85	89	Qualification for the Pyramid play-off
2	Buckie Thistle	34	28	3	3	92	26	+66	87	
3	Brora Rangers	34	26	2	6	116	32	+84	80	
4	Formartine United	34	23	5	6	81	31	+50	74	
5	Fraserburgh	34	21	8	5	91	31	+60	71	
6	Inverurie Loco Works	34	14	8	12	63	57	+6	50	
7	Nairn County	34	12	10	12	51	63	−12	46	
8	Huntly	34	13	6	15	44	49	−5	45	
9	Rothes	34	12	8	14	64	60	+4	44	
10	Banks O' Dee (Note: Banks O' Dee deducted 24 points for fielding an ineligible player in 8 matches.)	34	19	6	9	98	49	+49	39	
11	Forres Mechanics	34	10	6	18	57	60	−3	36	
12	Turriff United	34	11	3	20	56	76	−20	36	
13	Clachnacuddin	34	10	4	20	44	76	−32	34	
14	Lossiemouth	34	8	3	23	38	83	−45	27	
15	Keith	34	7	6	21	38	87	−49	27	
16	Wick Academy	34	7	5	22	34	100	−66	26	
17	Deveronvale	34	6	6	22	48	90	−42	24	
18	Strathspey Thistle	34	2	4	28	24	154	−130	10	

Rules for classification: 1) Points; 2) Goal difference; 3) Number of goals scored
(C) Champions

== Results ==
Home \ Away	BAN	BRE	BRO	BUC	CLA	DEV	FOU	FOM	FRA	HUN	INV	KEI	LOS	NAI	RTH	STR	TUR	WIC
Banks O' Dee	—	1–4	4–3	1–3	2–1	2–0	2–3	2–0	1–1	5–2	3–4	8–0	7–0	1–1	2–0	9–1	2–0	6–0
Brechin City	4–4	—	0–0	1–0	5–0	7–1	3–1	2–1	5–0	2–2	5–1	5–0	3–0	3–0	1–0	6–0	4–0	10–0
Brora Rangers	3–0	0–3	—	0–2	4–2	5–0	2–1	4–1	0–1	1–0	5–2	6–1	1–0	2–1	3–0	2–0	2–1	6–1
Buckie Thistle	2–2	0–2	4–2	—	5–0	3–2	1–0	2–0	2–1	2–0	2–0	3–0	2–1	3–0	1–1	8–0	7–1	2–1
Clachnacuddin	3–1	1–2	0–4	1–4	—	3–1	1–3	2–0	1–1	2–0	1–3	2–1	2–1	0–2	4–1	0–2	1–4	1–3
Deveronvale	1–4	1–3	0–6	1–2	3–3	—	0–3	2–1	2–3	1–3	0–3	4–3	2–0	2–3	0–1	7–0	2–0	3–3
Formartine United	2–0	2–0	2–1	1–2	4–0	2–1	—	2–0	0–1	2–0	2–1	6–0	5–0	3–1	2–1	6–1	2–1	6–0
Forres Mechanics	1–2	0–1	0–8	2–3	0–0	4–1	1–1	—	1–1	3–0	1–1	1–2	1–0	3–4	4–3	8–1	1–2	4–2
Fraserburgh	0–3	0–0	2–2	1–0	5–0	3–0	2–2	3–0	—	3–0	1–2	4–0	3–0	2–2	2–0	3–1	2–3	3–0
Huntly	0–2	0–1	1–3	1–1	0–1	1–0	1–2	2–1	1–4	—	1–1	1–0	2–1	3–1	1–1	2–0	2–0	5–2
Inverurie Loco Works	1–1	0–1	2–4	0–4	2–4	4–0	1–1	0–1	0–4	0–0	—	2–0	3–2	2–1	1–1	4–0	3–1	4–0
Keith	2–3	0–2	0–4	1–5	2–1	1–1	1–0	2–6	2–2	1–1	2–3	—	0–2	1–1	2–3	6–1	2–1	2–0
Lossiemouth	1–2	0–3	0–3	0–6	0–2	2–3	1–3	0–0	0–7	1–4	1–0	2–0	—	5–1	2–4	4–2	2–2	2–1
Nairn County	3–0	0–0	0–4	1–3	1–0	2–2	1–1	0–5	0–4	2–0	2–2	2–2	2–0	—	2–2	4–2	2–1	3–0
Rothes	2–0	0–1	0–4	2–4	3–2	1–1	2–2	2–1	0–3	0–2	0–5	3–0	3–1	2–0	—	9–0	6–1	2–2
Strathspey Thistle	0–7	0–5	0–11	0–2	2–2	2–2	0–2	0–4	0–9	1–4	2–2	0–1	1–3	1–1	0–7	—	1–6	1–2
Turriff United	1–1	1–4	0–4	0–1	4–1	5–1	2–4	2–0	1–4	2–1	3–2	1–1	1–2	1–3	3–1	5–0	—	0–3
Wick Academy	0–8	0–3	1–7	0–1	1–0	2–1	0–3	1–1	0–6	0–1	1–2	1–0	2–2	1–2	1–1	1–2	2–0	—

Legend: Blue = home team win; Yellow = draw; Red = away team win.

== Highland League play-off ==
Subject to the tier 6 champion clubs meeting the required licensing criteria for promotion, a play-off was scheduled to take place between the winners of the 2022–23 Midlands Football League (Carnoustie Panmure), 2022–23 North Caledonian Football League (Loch Ness) and the 2022–23 North Region Junior Football League (Culter), with the winners then playing the team finishing bottom of the Highland League (Strathspey Thistle). However, none of the tier 6 champions had the required SFA licence and as such there was no promotion to, or relegation from, the Highland League.
