= Thurso Pentland F.C. =

Association football club in Scotland

Thurso Pentland
- Full name: Thurso Pentland Football Club
- Founded: 1918
- Ground: Sir George's Park
- Coordinates: 58°35′32″N 3°30′57″W
- League: Caithness Amateur Football Association
Home colours	Away colours

Thurso Pentland Football Club is a football club from Thurso in Caithness, Scotland.

== History ==
The club was founded in 1918, originally under the name Pentland, by local men on leave from the First World War, who played ad hoc against Royal Navy sides and decided to stay together as a single club.

Pentland was generally the strongest side in the area up until the Second World War, the Caithness & Sutherland representative side always having a Pentland player in its XI until March 1939. Indeed, the Pentland outside-left in 1938, Roy Manson, was so impressive in an inter-county match that he was signed up by Aberdeen.

The club joined the Scottish Football Association as a senior club in 1934. It remained a member until the War, playing in the Scottish Qualifying Cup from 1934–35 to 1938–39, without winning a tie, but never being disgraced; in its final entry, it drew twice with Brora Rangers before going out at the third time of asking, Brora having won the toss to host the second replay. The original replay ended 4–4; the Rangers' Miller scored a hat-trick in seven first-half minutes, two from the penalty spot, and Thurso came back from 4–2 down at half-time. Pentland had been drawn to visit Ross County in the first round in 1939–40, but the competition was called off before the match could take place.

The Qualifying Cup was the only senior competition the club was able to enter - an attempt to join the North of Scotland Cup in 1938 was rejected because of distance.

The club currently plays in the Caithness Amateur Football Association league. Its main honours have come in the Highland Amateur Cup, reaching five of the first six finals, and winning the competition three times, the first in 1979–80 with a 5–2 win over Dingwall Thistle at Dudgeon Park.

== Colours ==
The club's colours are green and black. Its change kit for 2023–24 is all black.

== Ground ==
The club plays at Sir George's Park, also known as The Dammies.
