= Highland Amateur Cup =

- Founded: 1978; 48 years ago
- Region: Scottish Highlands
- Current champions: Golspie Stafford (1st title)
- Most championships: Pentland United (9 titles)

The Highland Amateur Cup is an annual football cup competition run by the Highland Executive branch of the Scottish Amateur Football Association. It also covers various offshore islands.

All teams affiliated to Highland Associations are eligible to enter; and so this competition covers one of the largest geographical areas for any district amateur cup competition in the UK.

Pentland United are the most successful club, having won the competition nine times.

Currently, the Associations affiliated to the Highland Amateur Cup are:

- Caithness AFA
- Inverness and District FA
- Lewis & Harris FA
- North West Sutherland AFA
- Orkney AFA
- Shetland AFA
- Uist & Barra AFA
- West Highland AFA

== Finals from 2007–2012 ==
Year	Teams	Venue	Notes
2007	Avoch and Point	Grant Street Park, Inverness	On 18 August. Avoch were competing in their 4th successive final, having beaten Lochs in the semi-final. The match finished 5–0 to the team from the Black Isle.
2008	Castletown and Pentland United	Harmsworth Park, Wick	Pentland took the lead in the first half before adding another two to win the game 3–0.
2009	Avoch and Kirkwall Thorfinn	Harmsworth Park, Wick	The game came down to a penalty shoot-out after Thorfinn 'threw away' a 2–0 lead - only for Avoch to draw level. The match went to penalties, and Kirkwall won, with their first Amateur Cup win since 1988.
2010	Golspie Stafford and Pentland United	Dudgeon Park, Brora	In front of a 500 strong crowd on 14 August, a Garry MacLeod free kick was all that came between the two sides in what was a fiercely contested game that ended 1–0 to Pentland United.
2011	Back F.C. (Lewis) and Avoch	Tulloch Caledonian Stadium, Inverness	On 20 August 2011, Avoch won 5–1, for their first success in the cup since 2007. A brace by Paul Brindle, followed by goals from Charlie Christie, Shaun Kerr and Gary Urqhuart, secured the win, with Martin Maclean scoring for Back.
2012	Avoch and Wick Groats	Tulloch Caledonian Stadium, Inverness	On 4 August, Avoch won 4–0, with Shaun Kerr scoring a hat-trick and Ronnie Jones grabbing the other. This was Avoch's fourth cup triumph in seven years.

== Past winners ==
Season	Winner	Score	Runner-up
1978	Blackmuir (1)	2–0	Thurso Pentland
1979	South Ronaldsay (1)	2–1	Halkirk
1980	Thurso Pentland (1)	5–2	Dingwall Thistle Youth
1981	Thurso Pentland (2)	1–0	Wick Groats
1982	Halkirk (1)	2–1	Thurso Pentland
1983	Thurso Pentland (3)	5–2	Muir of Ord Rovers
1984	Ness (1)	4–1	Bishopmill Villa
1985	Halkirk (2)	7–2	Conon
1986	Maryburgh (1)	1–0	Conon
1987	Pentland United (1)	1–0	Wick Groats
1988	Kirkwall Thorfinn (1)	2–1	Maryburgh
1989	Dingwall Thistle (1)	2–1	Halkirk
1990	Maryburgh (2)	3–1	Stornoway Athletic
1991	Ness (2)	1–0	Dingwall Thistle
1992	Ness (3)	1–0	Kirkwall Thorfinn
1993	Pentland United (2)	6–2	Southend
1994	Point (1)	1–0	Cromarty
1995	Ness (4)	4–2	Avoch
1996	Dingwall Thistle (2)	2–0	Kirkwall Thorfinn
1997	Kirkwall Rovers (1)	4–2	Contin
1998	Pentland United (3)	3–1	Inverness British Legion
1999	Contin (1)	1–0	Pentland United
2000	Pentland United (4)	4–0	Cromarty
2001	Wick Thistle (1)	2–1	Avoch
2002	Pentland United (5)	2–1	Portree
2003	Lochs (1)	3–2	Stornoway Athletic
2004	Back (1)	2–1	Avoch
2005	Lochs (2)	3–1	Avoch
2006	Avoch (1)	2–0	Fortrose & Rosemarkie Union
2007	Avoch (2)	5–0	Point
2008	Pentland United (6)	3–0	Castletown
2009	Kirkwall Thorfinn (2)	^{*}2–2	Avoch
2010	Pentland United (7)	1–0	Golspie Stafford
2011	Avoch (3)	5–1	Back
2012	Avoch (4)	4–0	Wick Groats
2013	Wick Groats (1)	1–0	Kirkwall Thorfinn
2014	Avoch (5)	2–1	Carloway
2015	Wick Groats (2)	3–1	Avoch
2016	Wick Groats (3)	^{*}0–0	Kirkwall Thorfinn
2017	Avoch (6)	2–1	Staxigoe United
2018	Pentland United (8)	2–1 _{(a.e.t.)}	Lerwick Spurs
2019	Wick Groats (4)	1–0	Avoch
2020	No Competition		
2021	No Competition		
2022	High Ormlie Hotspur (1)	^{*}1–1 _{(a.e.t.)}	Pentland United
2023	Avoch (7)	1–0	Wick Groats
2024	Pentland United (9)	2–1	Avoch
2025	Maryburgh (3)	3–1	Inver
2026	Golspie Stafford (1)	4–0	Whalsay

^{*} Won on penalties

== Performance by club ==
As of after 2026

Club	Wins	Last win	Runners-up	Last final lost
Pentland United	9	2024	2	2022
Avoch	7	2023	8	2024
Wick Groats	4	2019	4	2023
Ness	4	1995	0	—
Thurso Pentland	3	1983	2	1982
Maryburgh	3	2025	1	1988
Kirkwall Thorfinn	2	2009	4	2016
Halkirk	2	1985	2	1989
Dingwall Thistle	2	1996	1	1991
Lochs	2	2005	0	—
Golspie Stafford	1	2026	1	2010
Back	1	2004	1	2011
Contin	1	1999	1	1997
Point	1	1994	1	2007
High Ormlie Hotspur	1	2022	0	—
Wick Thistle	1	2001	0	—
Kirkwall Rovers	1	1997	0	—
South Ronaldsay	1	1979	0	—
Blackmuir	1	1978	0	—
Stornoway Athletic	0	—	2	2003
Cromarty	0	—	2	2000
Conon	0	—	2	1986
Whalsay	0	—	1	2026
Inver	0	—	1	2025
Lerwick Spurs	0	—	1	2018
Staxigoe United	0	—	1	2017
Carloway	0	—	1	2014
Castletown	0	—	1	2008
Fortrose & Rosemarkie Union	0	—	1	2006
Portree	0	—	1	2002
Inverness British Legion	0	—	1	1998
Southend	0	—	1	1993
Bishopmill Villa	0	—	1	1984
Muir of Ord Rovers	0	—	1	1983
Dingwall Thistle Youth	0	—	1	1980
