= 2016–17 North Caledonian Football League =

North Caledonian Football League
- Season: 2016–17
- Champions: Invergordon
- Runner up: Orkney

The 2016–17 North Caledonian Football League was competed for by eight clubs playing fourteen matches each. Halkirk United were the defending champions. St Duthus returned to the league following an eleven-year absence and Inverness Athletic, a new team, were also admitted.

== Teams ==
Team	Location	Home ground	Ref.
Alness United	Alness	Dalmore Park	
Golspie Sutherland	Golspie	King George V Park	
Halkirk United	Halkirk	Morrison Park	
Invergordon	Invergordon	Recreation Grounds	
Inverness Athletic	Muir of Ord	Pavilion Park	
Orkney	Kirkwall	The Pickaquoy Centre	
St Duthus	Tain	Links Playing Fields	
Thurso	Thurso	Sir George's Park	

== League table ==
Pos	Team	Pld	W	D	L	GF	GA	GD	Pts
1	Invergordon (C)	14	11	1	2	34	18	+16	34
2	Orkney	14	10	1	3	29	13	+16	31
3	Halkirk United	14	9	1	4	33	17	+16	28
4	Golspie Sutherland	14	6	2	6	33	33	0	20
5	Thurso	14	5	3	6	22	18	+4	18
6	St Duthus	14	4	2	8	22	30	−8	14
7	Inverness Athletic	14	2	2	10	27	39	−12	8
8	Alness United	14	2	2	10	19	51	−32	8

Updated to match(es) played on 8 April 2017. Source: North Caledonian Football League
Rules for classification: 1) Points; 2) Goal difference; 3) Number of goals scored
(C) Champions

== Results ==
Teams play each other twice making a total of 56 games, with each team playing 14.

Home \ Away	ALN	GOL	HAL	IFC	INA	ORK	STD	THU
Alness United		4–3	0–0	2–5	0–4	2–4	3–2	0–4
Golspie Sutherland	3–2		3–2	1–2	3–1	0–2	4–2	1–1
Halkirk United	6–3	4–1		3–2	3–0	1–0	5–0	3–1
Invergordon	2–0	5–4	1–0		3–1	1–0	3–3	1–0
Inverness Athletic	10–0	3–3	1–4	1–4		1–3	1–3	1–1
Orkney	5–2	4–2	2–0	2–0	2–0		1–2	1–0
Saint Duthus	1–1	0–3	3–0	0–1	4–2	1–2		1–2
Thurso	2–0	1–2	0–2	1–4	6–1	1–1	2–0	

Updated to match(es) played on 8 April 2017. Source: North Caledonian FA
Legend: Blue = home team win; Yellow = draw; Red = away team win.
