= Scourie F.C. =

Association football club in Scotland

Coordinates: 58.346822°N 5.157163°W

Scourie
- Full name: Scourie Football Club
- Founded: 2020
- Dissolved: 2021
- Ground: Achlochan Park, Scourie
- Capacity: 500
- 2020–21: North Caledonian League League 2, 6th of 6
Home colours	Away colours

Scourie Football Club were a senior association football club from the village of Scourie in the Scottish Highlands. They competed in the North Caledonian Football League and played their home games at Achlochan Park in Scourie.

== History ==
Scourie F.C. were formed in 2020 as a select team to represent the area of North West Sutherland during the winter months, competing in the North Caledonian Football League.

Following their successful application to join the North Caledonian FA in August 2020, the club were admitted to the temporary 'Ness Cup' League Division 2 for the 2020–21 season playing under chairman/manager Tony Reynoldson.

However, ahead of the 2021–22 season, the club withdrew – and resigned their membership of the North Caledonian Football Association, having lost every game played throughout the duration of their membership.
