= Inverness Union F.C. =

Former association football club in Scotland

Inverness Union
- Full name: Inverness Union Football Club
- Founded: 1888
- Dissolved: 1895 or 1899
- Ground: Needlefield Park
Home colours

Inverness Union Football Club was a football club which had its origins in the Longman area of Inverness, Scotland. It was one of the original members of the Highland Football League with colours of red shirts and white shorts.

It is disputed when the club dissolved. While the club is reported merged with Inverness Thistle in 1895 according to the club's history book,league tables show Union competing in the 1898–99 Highland League season.
