= Inverness Citadel F.C. =

Former association football club in Scotland

Inverness Citadel
- Full name: Inverness Citadel Football Club
- Nickname(s): The Sheep's Bags, The Del
- Founded: 1883
- Dissolved: 1937
- Ground: Shore Street Park; Inverness
Home colours

Inverness Citadel Football Club was a football team from Inverness, Scotland. Formed in 1883, it played in the Highland Football League from 1893 to 1935, before dissolving in 1937.

Citadel's traditional attire was maroon shirts with white shorts and maroon socks. Its home ground was Shore Street Park. It won a league championship in 1909. It regularly participated in the North Caledonian Football League as well, winning five times.

In the 1921–22 season it became the first Highland League side to defeat a Scottish Football League side in the Scottish Cup, going over Clackmannan 5–3 in the first round.

Citadel withdrew from the Highland League in 1935 due to financial problems and initially attempted to continue in football. The club committee voted to wind it up in 1937 due to "the apathy of the supporters".
