= Loch Ness F.C. =

Coordinates: 57.582°N 4.132°W

Loch Ness
- Full name: Loch Ness Football Club
- Founded: 1999
- Dissolved: 2024
- Ground: King George V Playing Field, Fortrose
- Capacity: 500
- 2023–24: North Caledonian League, 2nd of 12

Loch Ness Football Club was a Scottish football club who played the North Caledonian Football League, and were based in the town of Fortrose in the Scottish Highlands.

== History ==
Loch Ness were formed in 1999 by current manager Shane Carling, and for 20 years played as members of the welfare/amateur recreational leagues of the Inverness and District Football Association. The club formed a senior team in 2020, and were accepted as members of the North Caledonian Football Association, joining a temporary second tier of the association, known as the Ness Cup League. From 2021 to 2022, they played in the re-combined North Caledonian League.

During the summer of 2020, the club received widespread acknowledgement via social media after releasing prototypes for their new kits, which featured the Loch Ness Monster in the pattern. The designs were subsequently used and made by Lancashire company Zero Negativity Clothing, receiving orders worldwide upon release. As part of a sponsorship deal with WooHa Brewing Company, the sponsor created a limited edition lager named for the club.

Loch Ness played their first game in the Ness Cup League on 17 October. Their debut in the senior ranks resulted in an emphatic 11–1 win over Scourie, another team making their debut in the league, with hat-tricks from DJ MacPhee and Luke Seago.

In November, the club enlisted the help of former Clachnacuddin manager Iain Polworth to assist in coaching the side. The side finished 4th in League 2 when the season was curtailed.

In the 2021–22 season Loch Ness were pipped to the league title by Invergordon, ultimately finishing 2nd.

In the 2022–23 season, Loch Ness won the North Caledonian League title for the first time in their history with a 5–0 win over Fort William, the title also meant they qualified for the Scottish Cup for the first time, where they drew, and lost 3–1 to, Luncarty of the East of Scotland Premier Division.

The following season, they narrowly missed out on defending their North Caledonian title, finishing the season as runners up, 6 points behind champions, Invergordon.

In Early 2024, Loch Ness entered talks with Highland League side, Strathspey Thistle over a potential merger, however these merger talks broke down soon after.

Ahead of the 2024–25 season, Loch Ness folded for reasons unknown.

== Season-by-season standings ==
Season	Division	Tier	Pos.	Pld.	W	D	L	GD	Pts	Scottish Cup	Other honours
Summer League (1999–2020)	Inverness and District Football Association	N/A	Stats unavailable							Ineligible	Stats prior to 2017 unknown 2021 Premier Division winners
2020–21	North Caledonian League League 2	N/A	4th	10	4	3	3	+13	15	Ineligible	
2021–21	North Caledonian League	6	2nd	20	14	1	5	+25	43	Ineligible	
2022–23	North Caledonian League	6	1st	24	20	2	2	+73	62	Ineligible	
2023–24	North Caledonian League	6	2nd	22	17	3	2	+54	51	Preliminary round one; lost 3–1 to Luncarty	
Loch Ness enter abeyance

== Ground ==
Although the club has no fixed ground, they played their first season (2020–21) at Canal Park in Inverness, the regular home of Highland Rugby Club.
Between 2021–22 and their final season in 2023–24, they played their home games at King George V Park in Fortrose.

== Honours ==
- North Caledonian League
  - Champions: 2022–23
