= Kingsmills Park =

Football ground in Inverness, Scotland

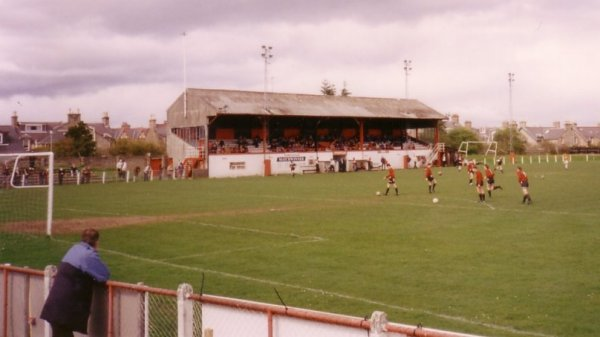

- Location within Inverness area
- Full name: Kingsmills Park
- Location: Inverness; Scotland
- Coordinates: 57.4757°N 4.2134°W
- Owner: Inverness Thistle F.C.
- Capacity: 5000 (600 seated)
- Surface: Grass

Construction
- Built: 1895
- Demolished: 1994

Kingsmills Park was a football ground in Inverness, Scotland. It was the home ground of Inverness Thistle F.C.

Following the merger of Inverness Thistle with Caledonian F.C. in 1994, the new team played at Caledonian's ground, Telford Street Park. In 1996 the club moved to the newly built Caledonian Stadium. A care home currently sits upon the location of the former ground.
