= Balintore F.C. =

Association football club in Scotland

- Full name: Balintore Football Club
- Nickname(s): The Gulls
- Founded: 1980
- Dissolved: 2012
- Ground: Seaboard Park
- Capacity: 1,000

Balintore Football Club was a senior football club in Scotland. They played at Seaboard Park in Balintore, representing the Seaboard Villages in the Scottish Highlands.

== Origins ==
The club was originally formed after the Great War under the names of "Seaboard Swifts" or simply "Balintore" playing friendly matches against neighbouring towns and villages. They became members of the Ross-shire Junior League in 1932 under the new name of "Seaside Swifts" and played competitively at a park located close to Hilton until the team disbanded upon the outbreak of the World War II.

After the war, a new combination emerged under the new name "Seaside Rovers" once again as members of the Ross-shire Junior League, before joining the Ross-shire Welfare League.

== Recent history ==
In 1980, Balintore F.C. became members of the North Caledonian Football League where they competed until their withdrawal at the end of the 2011–12 season. During their time as members of the league, they won the North Caledonian League championship on three occasions.

Recreational football club Balintore Welfare F.C. has also represented the village as members of the Ross-shire Welfare League since 2000.

In August 2017, Balintore registered their intent to re-enter the North Caledonian League for the 2018–2019 Season, however the proposal never came to fruition.

== Honours ==
North Caledonian FA (senior) Honours:

- North Caledonian League (3): 1989–90, 1990–91, 2005–06
- North Caledonian Cup Winners (4): 1984–85, 1996–97, 1997–98, 2004–05
- Chic Allan / Port Services Cup Winners (6): 1989–90, 1991–92, 1992–93, 1996–97, 1997–98, 2006–07
- Morris Newton Cup / SWL Winners (5): 1981–82, 1982–83, 1985–86, 1996–97, 1998–99
- Football Times Cup Winners (5): 1982–83, 1988–89, 1997–98, 2003–04, 2007–08
- MacNicol Trophy (1): 1985–86
- Frank Parker / Northern Times Shield (2): 1996–97, 1997–98
