= Invergordon F.C. =

Association football club in Scotland

Invergordon
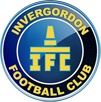
- Full name: Invergordon Football Club
- Founded: 1870s
- Ground: Recreation Grounds, Invergordon
- Capacity: 1,000
- Coordinates: 57.6930°N 4.1705°W
- Chairman: Edwin Skinner
- Manager: Gary Campbell
- League: Highland League
- 2025–26: North Caledonian League, 1st of 12 (promoted)
Home colours	Away colours

Invergordon Football Club is a senior football club from Invergordon in the Scottish Highlands. It plays at the Recreation Grounds and currently competes in the North Caledonian Football League, and will compete in the Highland League for the first time in its history from the 2026–27 season.

== Origins ==
Although the exact year the club was formed is unknown, the first mentions of an Invergordon Football Club are made in local newspapers around 1870. Invergordon were founder members of the Ross-shire Junior FA in 1894 and first competed for silverware for the Ross-shire Junior Cup in 1895.

They remained regular competitors in the Ross-shire Junior ranks either side of the First World War.

== Post-war history ==
Invergordon joined the North of Scotland Junior FA (later renamed to the North Caledonian League) immediately after the Second World War, winning the league championship in their first season. By the 1950s, they had attained full membership and have remained members of the league (with the exception of a handful of seasons) since that time.

In June 2022, following their North Caledonian League victory, it was announced that they would be making their debut appearance in the Scottish Cup preliminary round, being the first North Caledonian League side other than Golspie Sutherland to get the chance to participate in the trophy, losing 5–1 at the Global Energy Stadium to Newtongrange Star.

In February 2026, following their league title win, and with ground improvements underway, Invergordon officially applied to join the Highland League, as no other club feeder league side is eligible for promotion (other than Golspie Sutherland), and Brechin City moving to the Lowland League East for the 2026–27 season, regardless of final positioning, leaving the Highland League with only 17 teams, or 16 should the title winners gain promotion into the SPFL. In March 2026, they were officially granted an SFA Entry licence, making the club eligible for the Highland League Playoff. On 2 April 2026, Invergordon were officially invited to join the Highland League.

== Season record ==
Season	Division	Tier	Pos.	Pld.	W	D	L	GD	Pts	Scottish Cup	Other honours
1894–1946	Ross-Shire Junior FA	N/A	Stats unavailable							Ineligible	
1946–2015	North Caledonian League	N/A	Stats unavailable							Ineligible	4x League Titles, 1x North Caledonian Cup, 7x Football Times Cup
2015–16	North Caledonian League	N/A	5th	10	2	3	5	–6	9	Ineligible	
2016–17	North Caledonian League	N/A	1st	14	11	1	2	+16	34	Ineligible	Football Times Cup
2017–18	North Caledonian League	N/A	2nd	16	12	2	2	+27	38	Ineligible	
2018–19	North Caledonian League	N/A	2nd	16	11	1	4	+25	34	Ineligible	North Caledonian Cup
2019–20	North Caledonian League	N/A	Season abandoned due to Covid Pandemic								
2020–21	North Caledonian League	N/A	2nd	9	4	3	2	+4	15	Ineligible	
2021–22	North Caledonian League	6	1st	20	14	3	3	+19	45	Ineligible	
2022–23	North Caledonian League	6	2nd	24	19	1	4	+51	58	Preliminary Round; Lost 5–1 to Newtongrange Star	North Caledonian Cup, Football Times Cup
2023–24	North Caledonian League	6	1st	22	18	3	1	+38	57	Did not qualify	North Caledonian Cup, Football Times Cup
2024–25	North Caledonian League	6	1st	22	20	1	1	+79	61	Preliminary Round One; Lost 4–0 to Culter	North Caledonian Cup
2025–26	North Caledonian League	6	1st	22	21	0	1	+79	63	First Round; Lost 3–2 to Glenafton Athletic	North Caledonian Cup
2026–27	Highland League	5								First Round; Lost 3–2 to Threave Rovers	

== Ground ==
The club's original ground was the old "Blackpark" (now part of Invergordon Distillery), before they moved to their current playing field at the town's Recreation Grounds.

In January 2025, the club applied for planning permission to upgrade the ground, including building a stand, floodlights, dugouts and a fence.

== Club colours ==
Invergordon were originally known as the "Maroons" with their first kit donated by Plymouth Argyle. Their colours have been changed on several occasions before settling on yellow and royal blue for a number of years. In 2016, the club adopted new club colours of white and blue.

== Honours ==
- North Caledonian League
  - Champions: 1946–47, 1976–77, 1987–88, 2001–02, 2016–17, 2021–22, 2023–24, 2024–25, 2025–26
- North Caledonian Cup
  - Winners: 1987–88, 2018–19, 2022–23, 2023–24, 2024–25, 2025–26
- Football Times Cup
  - Winners: 1974–75, 1975–76, 1987–88, 1989–90, 1990–91, 1999–00, 2005–06, 2016–17, 2022–23, 2023–24
- Jock Mackay Memorial Cup
  - Winners: 2017–18, 2018–19, 2025–26
- Chic Allan Cup
  - Winners: 1988–89
- MacNicol Trophy
  - Winners: 1968–69, 1974–75, 1976–77
- Ness Cup
  - Winners: 1972–73, 1976–77
- Morris Newton / SWL Cup
  - Winners: 1989–90, 1997–98
