= 2022–23 Inverness Caledonian Thistle F.C. season =

Scottish football club season

Inverness Caledonian Thistle
2022–23 season
- Chairman: Ross Morrison
- Manager: Billy Dodds
- Stadium: Caledonian Stadium
- Scottish Championship: 6th
- Scottish Cup: Runners-up; lost 3–1 to Celtic
- League Cup: Round of 16; lost 4–0 to Motherwell
- Challenge Cup: Fourth round; lost 2–0 to Hamilton Academical
- Top goalscorer: League: Billy Mckay (14); All: Billy Mckay (19)
- Highest home attendance: 3,822; vs Dundee, 22 April 2023
- Lowest home attendance: 738; vs Stirling Albion, 26 November 2022
Home colours	Away colours

The 2022–23 Inverness Caledonian Thistle season is the club's 29th campaign in the SPFL, and the club's sixth consecutive season in the Scottish Championship after narrowly missing out on promotion, being defeated 6–2 on aggregate in the Premiership Play-Off Finals by St Johnstone.

== Fixtures and results ==
=== Friendlies ===
29 June 2022 Friendly	Clachnacuddin	0 – 10	Inverness Caledonian Thistle	Inverness
19:30			Mckay 13', 31' Shaw 18'; Harper 32'; Thompson 36'; Doran 39'; Samuels 47' (pen.); Cairns 55'; Boyd 73' MacGregor 77'	Stadium: Grant Street Park

2 July 2022 Friendly	Brora Rangers	0 – 1	Inverness Caledonian Thistle	Brora
15:00			Doran 55'	Stadium: Dudgeon Park

5 July 2022 Friendly	Inverness Caledonian Thistle	6 – 3	St. Johnstone	Inverness
15:15	Mckay 7', 9', 39' Harper 11'; Boyd 28' Samuels 70'		Bair 14' Kucheriavyi 64' Ferguson (?)	Stadium: Grant Street Park; Attendance: Behind Closed Doors
Note: Kick Off delayed twice due to accident on A9

6 July 2022 Friendly	Forres Mechanics	0 – 3	Inverness Caledonian Thistle	Forres
19:30			Oakley Cairns Macleod	Stadium: Mosset Park

20 May 2023 Friendly	(Northern Ireland) Dungannon Swifts	1 – 3	Inverness Caledonian Thistle	Dungannon
15:00	Scott 54'		Harper 8' Duffy 16' Samuels 56'	Stadium: Stanchmore Park

=== League ===
30 July 2022 Scottish Championship	Inverness Caledonian Thistle	1 – 1	Queen's Park	Inverness
15:00	Mckay 44'		Davidson 13'	Stadium: Caledonian Stadium; Attendance: 1,993

6 August 2022 Scottish Championship	Arbroath	0 – 0	Inverness Caledonian Thistle	Arbroath
15:00				Stadium: Gayfield Park; Attendance: 1,861

13 August 2022 Scottish Championship	Inverness Caledonian Thistle	4 – 1	Cove Rangers	Inverness
15:00	Samuels 6', 74' Doran 31' Shaw 90+2'		Leitch 46'	Stadium: Caledonian Stadium; Attendance: 2,106

19 August 2022 Scottish Championship	Partick Thistle	4 – 1	Inverness Caledonian Thistle	Glasgow
19:45	Graham 21', 35' Holt 59' (pen.) Dowds 84'		Oakley 90+2'	Stadium: Firhill Stadium; Attendance: 2,632
Note: Live on BBC Scotland

27 August 2022 Scottish Championship	Inverness Caledonian Thistle	0 – 1	Greenock Morton	Inverness
15:00			Gillespie 84' (pen.)	Stadium: Caledonian Stadium; Attendance: 1,924

3 September 2022 Scottish Championship	Raith Rovers	0 – 2	Inverness Caledonian Thistle	Kirkcaldy
15:00			Allardice 61' (pen.); Mckay 90+2'	Stadium: Starks Park; Attendance: 1,745

10 September 2022 Scottish Championship	Inverness Caledonian Thistle	P – P	Hamilton Academical	Inverness
15:00				Stadium: Caledonian Stadium
Note: League fixtures postponed by the SPFL out of respect following the death of Queen Elizabeth II

17 September 2022 Scottish Championship	Dundee	2 – 3	Inverness Caledonian Thistle	Dundee
15:00	Sweeney 12', (yellow card) 89' (yellow-red card); McMullan 57'		Harper 15', 83', Mckay 45+2' (pen.)	Stadium: Dens Park; Attendance: 4,396

1 October 2022 Scottish Championship	Ayr United	0 – 1	Inverness Caledonian Thistle	Ayr
15:00			Harper 47'	Stadium: Somerset Park; Attendance: 1,866

7 October 2022 Scottish Championship	Inverness Caledonian Thistle	1 – 0	Partick Thistle	Inverness
15:00	Mckay 75'		Turner (red card) 40'	Stadium: Caledonian Stadium; Attendance: 2,354

15 October 2022 Scottish Championship	Cove Rangers	0 – 1	Inverness Caledonian Thistle	Aberdeen
15:00			Boyd 19'	Stadium: Balmoral Stadium; Attendance: 1,071

18 October 2022 Scottish Championship	Inverness Caledonian Thistle	0 – 1	Hamilton Academical	Inverness
19:45			Winter 22'	Stadium: Caledonian Stadium; Attendance: 2,052
Note: Rescheduled fixture from 10 September

22 October 2022 Scottish Championship	Inverness Caledonian Thistle	1 – 1	Raith Rovers	Inverness
15:00	Deas 38'		Stanton 13'	Stadium: Caledonian Stadium; Attendance: 2,225

28 October 2022 Scottish Championship	Greenock Morton	4 – 0	Inverness Caledonian Thistle	Greenock
19:45	Muirhead 6', Gillespie 12', Carson (o.g.) 41', Blues 73'			Stadium: Cappielow Park; Attendance: 1,516

5 November 2022 Scottish Championship	Inverness Caledonian Thistle	1 – 1	Arbroath	Inverness
15:00	Shaw 52'		Shanks 60'	Stadium: Caledonian Stadium; Attendance: 1,847

12 November 2022 Scottish Championship	Queen's Park	2 – 1	Inverness Caledonian Thistle	Stenhousemuir
17:30	Fox 50'; Murray 73'		Mckay 18'	Stadium: Ochilview Park; Attendance: 593

19 November 2022 Scottish Championship	Inverness Caledonian Thistle	2 – 2	Ayr United	Inverness
15:00	Shaw 6', 87'		McKenzie 66', Akinyemi 82'	Stadium: Caledonian Stadium; Attendance: 2,066

3 December 2022 Scottish Championship	Inverness Caledonian Thistle	0 – 1	Dundee	Inverness
15:00			McMullan 26'	Stadium: Caledonian Stadium; Attendance: 2,435

17 December 2022 Scottish Championship	Hamilton Academical	P – P	Inverness Caledonian Thistle	Hamilton
15:00				Stadium: New Douglas Park
Note: Postponed due to frozen pitch

23 December 2022 Scottish Championship	Partick Thistle	5 – 1	Inverness Caledonian Thistle	Glasgow
19:45	Graham 16', Turner 39', McKinnon 54', Muirhead 58', Daniel Mullen 75'		Doran 74', Duffy (red card) 77'	Stadium: Firhill Stadium; Attendance: 2,243

2 January 2023 Scottish Championship	Inverness Caledonian Thistle	6 – 1	Cove Rangers	Inverness
15:00	Mckay 32', 44' (pen.), 64', Devine 40', McClelland (o.g.) 50', Ross (o.g.) 52',		Sanders 22'	Stadium: Caledonian Stadium; Attendance: 2,052

7 January 2023 Scottish Championship	Arbroath	1 – 4	Inverness Caledonian Thistle	Arbroath
15:00	El-Mhanni 26'		Mckay 9', Henderson 45', MacKay 65', Nicolson 86'	Stadium: Gayfield Park; Attendance: 1,803

14 January 2023 Scottish Championship	Inverness Caledonian Thistle	0 – 0	Queen's Park	Inverness
15:00				Stadium: Caledonian Stadium; Attendance: 2,038

28 January 2023 Scottish Championship	Raith Rovers	2 – 2	Inverness Caledonian Thistle	Kirkcaldy
15:00	Vaughan 29', Connolly 62'		Henderson 49', Mckay 83'	Stadium: Starks Park; Attendance: 2,025

4 February 2023 Scottish Championship	Inverness Caledonian Thistle	2 – 2	Greenock Morton	Inverness
15:00	Mckay 57', Cairns 85'		Miller 5', Muirhead 80'	Stadium: Caledonian Stadium; Attendance: 1,852

18 February 2023 Scottish Championship	Inverness Caledonian Thistle	0 – 3	Hamilton Academical	Inverness
15:00			De Bolle 47', Tiehi 80', Smith 87' (pen.)	Stadium: Caledonian Stadium; Attendance: 2,171

21 February 2023 Championship	Hamilton Academical	2 – 1	Inverness Caledonian Thistle	Hamilton
19:45	O'Reilly 19', Smith 73' (pen.)		Allardice 43', Mckay (yellow card) 90+4' (yellow-red card)	Stadium: New Douglas Park; Attendance: 752

25 February 2023 Scottish Championship	Dundee	1 – 1	Inverness Caledonian Thistle	Dundee
15:00	Robinson (pen.), 13'		Harper 56'	Stadium: Dens Park; Attendance: 4,447

4 March 2023 Scottish Championship	Ayr United	1 – 2	Inverness Caledonian Thistle	Ayr
15:00	Akinyemi 12', O'Connor (red card) 29'		Welsh 19', Henderson 74'	Stadium: Somerset Park; Attendance: 1,820

18 March 2023 Scottish Championship	Queen's Park	2 – 1	Inverness Caledonian Thistle	Stenhousemuir
15:00	Savoury 64', Eze 70'		MacKay 27'	Stadium: Ochilview Park; Attendance: 627

24 March 2023 Scottish Championship	Inverness Caledonian Thistle	1 – 0	Partick Thistle	Inverness
19:45	Shaw 50'; Welsh (red card) 56'			Stadium: Caledonian Stadium; Attendance: 2,075

1 April 2023 Scottish Championship	Greenock Morton	1 – 2	Inverness Caledonian Thistle	Greenock
15:00	Gillespie 69' (pen.)		Allardice 54'; Carson 88'	Stadium: Cappielow Park; Attendance: 1,958

8 April 2023 Scottish Championship	Inverness Caledonian Thistle	2 – 0	Raith Rovers	Inverness
15:00	Henderson 12'; Shaw 21'			Stadium: Caledonian Stadium; Attendance: 2,198

11 April 2023 Scottish Championship	Inverness Caledonian Thistle	2 – 0	Arbroath	Inverness
19:45	Shaw 53', Allardice 78' (pen.), Henderson (red card) 79'			Stadium: Caledonian Stadium; Attendance: 2,038

15 April 2023 Scottish Championship	Cove Rangers	1 – 2	Inverness Caledonian Thistle	Aberdeen
15:00	Vigurs 56'		Mckay 67' (pen.), Harper 71'	Stadium: Balmoral Stadium; Attendance: 959

18 April 2023 Scottish Championship	Hamilton Academical	1 – 2	Inverness Caledonian Thistle	Hamilton
19:45	Smith 72'		Shaw 75'; Mckay 88'	Stadium: New Douglas Park; Attendance: 1,316
Note: Moved forward from 29 April due to Inverness playing Falkirk in the Scottish Cup Semi Final

22 April 2023 Scottish Championship	Inverness Caledonian Thistle	1 – 1	Dundee	Inverness
15:00	Samuels 75'		Cameron 60'	Stadium: Caledonian Stadium; Attendance: 3,822

5 May 2023 Scottish Championship	Inverness Caledonian Thistle	1 – 2	Ayr United	Inverness
15:00	Shaw 81'		Mullin 35'; McKenzie 88'	Stadium: Caledonian Stadium; Attendance: 3,435

=== Scottish Cup ===
26 November 2022 Third Round	Inverness Caledonian Thistle	3 – 2	Stirling Albion	Inverness
15:00	Duffy 32'; Ram 40'; Doran 68'	Report	Carrick 27', 45+1'	Stadium: Caledonian Stadium; Attendance: 738; Referee: Dan McFarlane

21 January 2023 Fourth round	Inverness Caledonian Thistle	P – P	Queen's Park	Inverness
15:00				Stadium: Caledonian Stadium
Note: Postponed due to snowbound pitch

31 January 2023 Fourth Round	Inverness Caledonian Thistle	3 – 0 (Awarded)	Queen's Park	Inverness
19:45		Report	Thomas 74'; Williamson 84'	Stadium: Caledonian Stadium; Attendance: 869; Referee: Chris Graham
Note: Inverness awarded win after Queen's Park fielded an ineligible player in their initial 2–0 win.

11 February 2023 Fifth Round	Livingston	0 – 3	Inverness Caledonian Thistle	Livingston
15:00		Report	Mckay 51', 80'; Welsh 62'	Stadium: Almondvale Stadium; Attendance: 1,284; Referee: Don Robertson

10 March 2023 Quarter Final	Inverness Caledonian Thistle	2 – 1	Kilmarnock	Inverness
19:45	Mckay 24' (pen.); Welsh 50'		Vassell 3'	Stadium: Caledonian Stadium; Attendance: 2,902

29 April 2023 Semi Final	Falkirk	0 – 3	Inverness Caledonian Thistle	Glasgow
12:15			Mckay 7' (pen.), 57'; MacKay 34'	Stadium: Hampden Park; Attendance: 12,877

3 June 2023 Final	Celtic	3 – 1	Inverness Caledonian Thistle	Glasgow
17:30	Furuhashi 38' Abada 65' Jota 90+1'		MacKay 85'	Stadium: Hampden Park

=== League Cup ===
9 July 2022 Scottish League Cup Group G	Kelty Hearts	0 – 1	Inverness Caledonian Thistle	Kelty
15:00			Oakley 88'	Stadium: New Central Park; Attendance: 601

12 July 2022 Scottish League Cup Group G	Livingston	1 – 2	Inverness Caledonian Thistle	Livingston
19:45	Stryjek (red card) 59'; Holt 84'		Samuels 37'; MacKay 67'	Stadium: Almondvale Stadium; Attendance: 944

19 July 2022 Scottish League Cup Group G	Inverness Caledonian Thistle	4 – 0	Albion Rovers	Inverness
19:45	Mckay 2', Harper 41', 53' Duffy 46'			Stadium: Caledonian Stadium; Attendance: 871

23 July 2022 Scottish League Cup Group G	Inverness Caledonian Thistle	1 – 1 (5 – 3 p)	Cove Rangers	Inverness
15:00	MacGregor 13'		Megginson 19'	Stadium: Caledonian Stadium; Attendance: 1,020
	Penalties
	Boyd (penalty scored) Samuels (penalty scored); Harper (penalty scored); Mckay (penalty scored) Allardice (penalty scored)		(penalty scored) Megginson (penalty scored) Leitch; (penalty missed) Fyvie (penalty scored) Logan

31 August 2022 Scottish League Cup Round of 16	Motherwell	4 – 0	Inverness Caledonian Thistle	Motherwell
19:45	van Veen 9', 38' (pen.), 67' (pen.), Devine (o.g.) 26'			Stadium: Fir Park; Attendance: 3,982

=== Challenge Cup ===
24 September 2022 Scottish Challenge Cup Third Round	Inverness Caledonian Thistle	3 – 3 (4 – 3 p)	Brechin City	Inverness
14:00	Oakley 6', 47' (pen.); Shaw 38'		McHattie 28' McGrath 71' Spark 78'	Stadium: Caledonian Stadium; Attendance: 832
	Penalties
	Mckay (penalty scored) Oakley (penalty missed); Boyd (penalty scored); Allardice (penalty scored) Deas (penalty scored)		(penalty missed) Bain (penalty scored) McGrath; (penalty scored) Loudon; (penalty scored) Inglis (penalty missed) McInnes

10 December 2022 Scottish Challenge Cup Fourth Round	Hamilton Academical	2 – 0	Inverness Caledonian Thistle	Hamilton
15:00	Nixon (o.g.) 4', Mimnaugh 33'			Stadium: New Douglas Park; Attendance: 488

== Team statistics ==
=== League standings ===
Pos	Team	Pld	W	D	L	GF	GA	GD	Pts	Promotion, qualification or relegation
4	Partick Thistle	36	16	9	11	65	45	+20	57	Qualification for the Premiership play-off quarter-final
5	Greenock Morton	36	15	12	9	53	43	+10	57	
6	Inverness Caledonian Thistle	36	15	10	11	52	47	+5	55	
7	Raith Rovers	36	11	10	15	46	49	−3	43	
8	Arbroath	36	6	16	14	29	47	−18	34	

Rules for classification: 1) Points; 2) Goal difference; 3) Goals scored; 4) Head-to-to head points; 5) Head-to-head goal difference; 6) Play-off (only for deciding promotion, play-off participation and relegation).

== First team player statistics ==
As of 3 June 2023, vs Celtic.

=== League goalscorers ===
Rank	Player	Goals
1st	(Northern Ireland) Billy Mckay	14
2nd	(England) Nathan Shaw	9
3rd	(Scotland) Cameron Harper	5
4th	(Scotland) Jay Henderson	4
4th	(Scotland) Scott Allardice	4
6th	(England) Austin Samuels	3
7th	(Republic of Ireland) Aaron Doran	2
7th	(Scotland) Daniel MacKay	2
9th	(England) George Oakley	1
9th	(Scotland) Steven Boyd	1
9th	(Scotland) Robbie Deas	1
9th	(Northern Ireland) Danny Devine	1
9th	(Scotland) Lewis Nicolson	1
9th	(Scotland) Ethan Cairns	1
9th	(Scotland) Sean Welsh	1
9th	(England) David Carson	1

=== Overall goalscorers ===
Rank	Player	Goals
1st	(Northern Ireland) Billy Mckay	19
2nd	(England) Nathan Shaw	11
3rd	(Scotland) Cameron Harper	7
4th	(Scotland) Daniel MacKay	5
5th	(England) George Oakley	4
5th	(England) Austin Samuels	4
5th	(Scotland) Jay Henderson	4
5th	(Scotland) Scott Allardice	4
9th	(Republic of Ireland) Aaron Doran	3
9th	(Scotland) Sean Welsh	3
11th	(Scotland) Wallace Duffy	2
13th	(Scotland) Roddy MacGregor	1
13th	(Scotland) Steven Boyd	1
13th	(Scotland) Robbie Deas	1
13th	(England) Max Ram	1
13th	(Northern Ireland) Danny Devine	1
13th	(Scotland) Lewis Nicolson	1
13th	(Scotland) Ethan Cairns	1
13th	(England) David Carson	1

*players in italics left the club during the season

=== Hat-tricks ===
Player	Competition	Score	Opponent	Date
(Northern Ireland) Billy Mckay	Friendly	6–3	St. Johnstone	5 July 2022
(Northern Ireland) Billy Mckay	Scottish Championship	6–1	Cove Rangers	2 January 2023

=== Transfers ===
Transfers In
Player	Age*	Pos	From	Fee	Date	Notes
(England) Nathan Shaw	21	MF	(England) AFC Fylde	Free	19 June 2022	
(Scotland) Steven Boyd	25	FW	(Scotland) Alloa Athletic	Free	19 June 2022	
(England) Max Ram	21	DF	(England) Wycombe Wanderers	Free	1 July 2022	
(Republic of Ireland) Zak Delaney	20	DF	(England) West Bromwich Albion	Free	4 July 2022	
(England) George Oakley	26	FW	(England) Woking	Free	6 July 2022	
(Scotland) Keith Bray	17	MF	Academy	Apprenticeship	11 July 2022	
(Scotland) Matthew Strachan	18	DF	Academy	Apprenticeship	11 July 2022	
(Scotland) Calum MacKay	18	MF	Academy	Apprenticeship	11 July 2022	
(Scotland) Aaron Nicolson	17	DF	Academy	Apprenticeship	4 November 2022	
(Wales) Ryan Barrett	21	DF	(England) Newcastle United	Free	26 November 2022	Short-term deal
(England) Ben Woods	20	MF	(England) Burnley	Free	13 January 2023	Short-term deal

Transfers Out
Player	Age*	Pos	To	Fee	Date	Notes
(Scotland) Ryan Fyffe	21	DF	(Scotland) Buckie Thistle	Free	4 May 2022	
(Scotland) Ruardhri Nicol	18	GK	(Scotland) Brora Rangers	Released	17 June 2022	
(Scotland) Harry Nicolson	21	DF	(Republic of Ireland) Finn Harps	Free	6 July 2022	
(Scotland) Kirk Broadfoot	37	DF	(Scotland) Open Goal Broomhill	Free	8 July 2022	
(Wales) Ryan Barrett	21	DF	(England) Blyth Spartans	Free	20 January 2023	
(England) George Oakley	27	ST	(Scotland) Greenock Morton	Free	20 January 2023	
(Scotland) Aly Riddle	18	ST	(Scotland) Clachnacuddin	Free	20 January 2023	

Loans In/Return
Player	Age*	Pos	From	Duration	Date In	Date Out	Notes
(Scotland) Daniel MacKay	21	MF	(Scotland) Hibernian	Season	8 July 2022	1 July 2023	
(Scotland) Jay Henderson	20	MF	(Scotland) St. Mirren	Half Season	1 January 2023	1 July 2023	

Loans Out/Return
Player	Age*	Pos	To	Duration	Date Out	Date In	Notes
(Scotland) Reece McAlear	20	MF	(England) Norwich City	Return	27 May 2022	N/A	
(Scotland) Logan Chalmers	22	FW	(Scotland) Dundee United	Return	27 May 2022	N/A	
(England) Joe Hardy	23	FW	(England) Accrington Stanley	Return	27 May 2022	N/A	
(Scotland) Robbie Thompson	18	MF	(Scotland) Clachnacuddin	Full Season	22 July 2022	1 January 2023	All recalled in January due to injury crisis
(Scotland) Ethan Cairns	17	FW	(Scotland) Forres Mechanics	Full Season	28 July 2022	1 January 2023	All recalled in January due to injury crisis
(Scotland) Aly Riddle	18	DF	(Scotland) Clachnacuddin	Half Season	29 July 2022	1 January 2023	All recalled in January due to injury crisis
(Scotland) Harry Hennem	18	MF	(Scotland) Wick Academy	Half Season	5 August 2022	1 January 2023	All recalled in January due to injury crisis
(Scotland) Lewis Nicolson	18	DF	(Scotland) Elgin City	Half Season	16 August 2022	1 January 2023	All recalled in January due to injury crisis
(Scotland) Matthew Strachan	17	DF	(Scotland) Nairn County	Half Season	24 February 2023	31 June 2023	
