= 2023 Scottish Cup final =

Football match

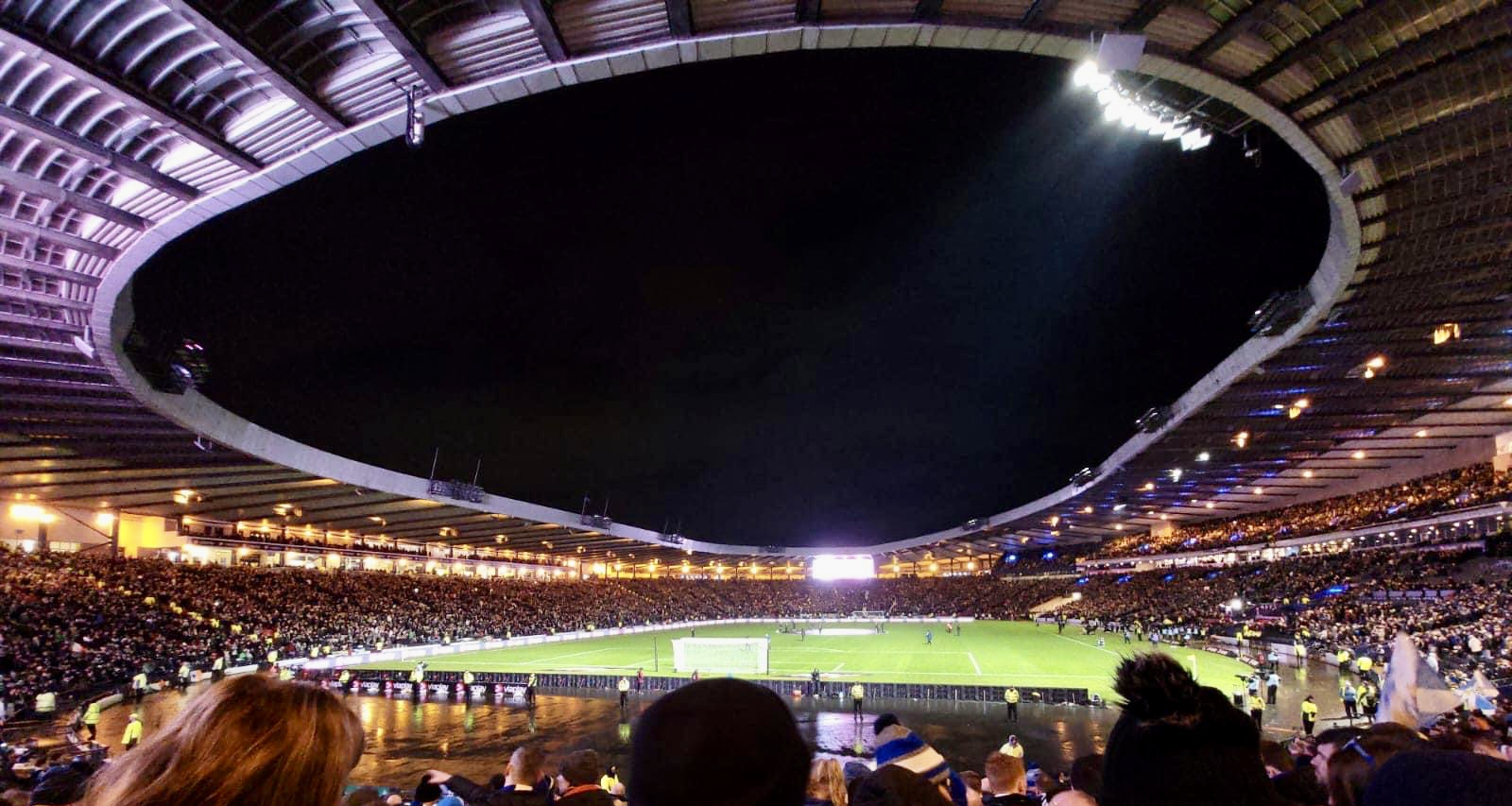
- The match took place at Hampden Park
- Event: 2022–23 Scottish Cup
Celtic	Inverness Caledonian Thistle
3	1
- Date: 3 June 2023
- Venue: Hampden Park, Glasgow
- Man of the Match: Jota
- Referee: John Beaton
- Attendance: 47,247

The 2023 Scottish Cup final was the final match of the 2022–23 Scottish Cup, the 138th edition of Scotland's most prestigious knockout football competition. It was contested by Celtic and Inverness Caledonian Thistle at Hampden Park, Glasgow, on 3 June 2023.

== Background ==
The 2023 final was a record 60th Scottish Cup final appearance for Celtic, while it was only Inverness Caledonian Thistle's second final appearance, having won the cup in 2015. It was the first time that the clubs had met in the final, but the eighth time they had met at any stage of the competition, the most recent meeting taking place in the fifth round in the 2016–17 season. It was also the first time since 2015 that teams in different divisions had contested the final, not including the 2020 final, where Heart of Midlothian were in the unique position of being a Premiership side when the competition was suspended due to the COVID-19 pandemic, but a Championship side when it resumed midway through the 2020–21 season.

The winners were due to enter the 2023–24 UEFA Europa League play-off round, however, as Celtic had already qualified for the 2023–24 UEFA Champions League, the team placed third in the Premiership (Aberdeen) entered the Europa League instead.

== Road to the final ==
Celtic		Round	Inverness Caledonian Thistle	
Opposition	Score	Round	Opposition	Score
N/A		3rd	Stirling Albion (H)	3–2
Greenock Morton (H)	5–0	4th	Queen's Park (H)	0–2
St Mirren (H)	5–1	5th	Livingston (A)	3–0
Heart of Midlothian (A)	3–0	QF	Kilmarnock (H)	2–1
Rangers (N)	1–0	SF	Falkirk (N)	3–0
Key: (H) = Home venue; (A) = Away venue; (N) = Neutral venue

Inverness Caledonian Thistle entered the Scottish Cup at the third round, securing their place in the fourth round by defeating Stirling Albion 3–2 at Caledonian Stadium. Celtic entered at the fourth round, with a 5–0 home victory over Greenock Morton ensuring their progression to the fifth round. Inverness Caledonian Thistle were eliminated from the competition after a 2–0 defeat to Queen's Park in their rescheduled tie, however, they were reinstated after Queen's Park were found to have fielded an ineligible player. In the fifth round, Celtic beat St Mirren 5–1 in Glasgow, with a flurry of late goals in the match, while Inverness Caledonian Thistle defeated Premiership side Livingston 3–0 at Almondvale Stadium.

Caley Thistle also faced Premiership opposition in the quarter-finals, beating Kilmarnock 2–1 in Inverness, while Celtic travelled to Tynecastle Park to face Heart of Midlothian, where they ran out 3–0 winners. The semi-finals were both played at Hampden Park, with Inverness Caledonian Thistle facing Falkirk on 29 April and Celtic taking on holders Rangers the next day. In a repeat of the 2015 final, Caley Thistle defeated Falkirk, with goals from Billy Mckay and Daniel MacKay taking the club to only the second Scottish Cup final in its history. They would also become the first and only team to have made the final, having been eliminated from the competition in the same season. On 30 April, Celtic beat Rangers, with Jota scoring the only goal of the game.

== Match ==
=== Details ===
3 June 2023
17:30 BST

Celtic	3–1	Inverness Caledonian Thistle
Furuhashi 38'; Abada 65'; Jota 90+1'	Report	D. MacKay 84'

Hampden Park, Glasgow
Attendance: 47,247
Referee: John Beaton

Celtic	Inverness Caledonian Thistle

GK	1	(England) Joe Hart
RB	2	(Canada) Alistair Johnston
CB	24	(Japan) Tomoki Iwata
CB	4	(Sweden) Carl Starfelt
LB	3	(Scotland) Greg Taylor
CM	33	(Denmark) Matt O'Riley	(substituted off) 76'
CM	42	(Scotland) Callum McGregor (c)
CM	41	(Japan) Reo Hatate	(substituted off) 76'
RW	17	(Portugal) Jota	(substituted off) 90+2'
CF	8	(Japan) Kyogo Furuhashi	(substituted off) 59'
LW	38	(Japan) Daizen Maeda	(substituted off) 45'
Substitutes:
GK	31	(Switzerland) Benjamin Siegrist
FW	9	(Montenegro) Sead Hakšabanović	(substituted on) 76'
FW	11	(Israel) Liel Abada	(substituted on) 45'
MF	14	(Scotland) David Turnbull	(substituted on) 76'
FW	19	(South Korea) Oh Hyeon-gyu	(substituted on) 59'
DF	25	(Argentina) Alexandro Bernabei
MF	49	(Scotland) James Forrest	(substituted on) 90+2'
DF	56	(Scotland) Anthony Ralston
DF	57	(Scotland) Stephen Welsh
Manager:
(Australia) Ange Postecoglou

GK	1	(Scotland) Mark Ridgers
RB	2	(Scotland) Wallace Duffy	(yellow card) 70'
CB	6	(Northern Ireland) Danny Devine		(substituted off) 75'
CB	5	(Scotland) Robbie Deas
LB	3	(Scotland) Cameron Harper
CM	18	(Scotland) Scott Allardice		(substituted off) 81'
CM	8	(England) David Carson	(yellow card) 44'
CM	4	(Scotland) Sean Welsh (c)
RW	20	(Scotland) Jay Henderson		(substituted off) 68'
CF	9	(Northern Ireland) Billy Mckay		(substituted off) 75'
LW	22	(England) Nathan Shaw		(substituted off) 81'
Substitutes:
GK	21	(Scotland) Cameron Mackay
MF	10	(Republic of Ireland) Aaron Doran		(substituted on) 81'
MF	12	(Scotland) Roddy MacGregor		(substituted on) 81'
MF	16	(Scotland) Lewis Hyde
MF	17	(Scotland) Daniel MacKay		(substituted on) 68'
DF	23	(Republic of Ireland) Zak Delaney		(substituted on) 75'
FW	24	(England) Austin Samuels		(substituted on) 75'
MF	28	(England) Ben Woods
FW	30	(Scotland) Steven Boyd
Manager:
(Scotland) Billy Dodds

Man of the Match:
Jota (Celtic)

Assistant referees:
Graeme Stewart
Gordon Crawford
Fourth official:
David Dickinson
Video assistant referee:
Steven McLean
Gary Hilland (assistant)

Match rules

- 90 minutes
- 30 minutes of extra time if necessary
- Penalty shoot-out if scores still level
- Nine named substitutes
- Maximum of five substitutions in normal time (a sixth substitute is permitted in extra time)

== Media coverage ==
BBC Scotland and Viaplay Sports broadcast the final; this was the fifth season of a six-year deal in the United Kingdom to broadcast Scottish Cup matches.
