= Cameron Harper =

Cameron Harper may refer to:

- Cameron Harper (footballer) (born 2001), Scottish footballer
- Cameron Harper (soccer) (born 2001), American soccer player
