= 2020–21 Inverness Caledonian Thistle F.C. season =

Scottish football club season

Inverness Caledonian Thistle
2020–21 season
- Chairman: Ross Morrison
- Manager: John Robertson; Neil McCann (interim)
- Stadium: Caledonian Stadium
- Scottish Championship: 5th
- Scottish Cup: Fourth Round lost 2–1 vs. St Mirren
- League Cup: Group stage
- Top goalscorer: League: Nikolay Todorov (9); All: Nikolay Todorov (11)
- Highest home attendance: 300, vs. Raith Rovers (21 November 2020)
- Lowest home attendance: 0
- Average home league attendance: 46
Home colours	Away colours

The 2020–21 Inverness Caledonian Thistle season is the club's 27th season in existence, and their fourth consecutive season in the Championship, the second-tier of Scottish football.

== Events ==
=== Pre-season ===
- 5 June 2020: Inverness CT announce a new kit deal with German manufactures, Puma, on a multi-year partnership, and a sponsorship deal with Intelligent Land Investments Group. Profits from the pink-themed away kit will go towards local charity, Highland Hospice.
- 15 June 2020: Manager John Robertson signs a new deal keeping him in charge until the 2022–23 season.
- 5 July 2020: Season ticket sales surpass half of the previous season's sales within a week of launching.
- 9 July 2020: Former player Shane Sutherland returns to Inverness, 8 years after he initially left for Elgin City, having signed a Pre Contract Agreement in the January transfer window.
- 6 August 2020: Celtic player Robbie Deas signs a 3-year-deal at the Caledonian Stadium.
- 10 August 2020: Inverness are drawn into Group A for the League Cup, alongside Hearts, Raith, Cowdenbeath and East Fife.
- 13 August 2020: Scott Allardice signs a 1-year-deal from Irish club, Waterford.
- 17 August 2020: Scottish Cup winning defender Danny Devine returns to Inverness, signing a 2-year-deal from Dunfermline Athletic.

=== September 2020 ===
- 11 September 2020: Ryan Fyffe and Harry Nicolson re-sign for Inverness after being initially released at the end of the previous season as a cost cutting measure.
  - Club Historian, Ian Broadfoot's book 'Milestones and Memories' detailing the club's twenty-five year history, goes to print.
- 27 September 2020: Inverness take on Elgin City in a friendly at Borough Briggs, with the Invernesians recording a 7–3 win.
- 30 September 2020: Inverness beat Nairn County 7–0 at Station Park, in another friendly.

=== October 2020 ===
- 3 October 2020: Two friendlies: One half of the Inverness squad played Invernesian rivals, Clachnacuddin, at Grant Street Park, claiming a 2–0 win; while the other half met Elgin City at the Caledonian Stadium, recording a 1–1 draw.
- 4 October 2020: Kai Kennedy signs a loan deal with Inverness from Rangers.
- 5 October 2020: Within days of agreeing a transfer to Greenock Morton, Wallace Duffy signs for Inverness from St Johnstone, after the Morton move is nullified.
- 7 October 2020: Inverness kick-off the season with a 1–0 defeat to Hearts in the League Cup.
- 13 October 2020: Inverness failed to beat League Two side, Cowdenbeath, with the Highlanders 'winning' 4–2 on penalties after a 0–0 draw.
- 18 October 2020: Inverness start the league campaign losing 3–1 to Dunfermline despite Nikolay Todorov scoring within the first minute of the game.
- 24 October 2020: Inverness draw 1–1 at home against Ayr United. The match drew much media attention due to the ball-tracking AI camera confusing a linesman's bald head for the ball.
- 31 October 2020: Inverness defeat Arbroath 3–1.

=== November 2020 ===
- 6 November 2020: The book, 'Milestones and Memories' is launched.
- 7 November 2020: Hearts defeat Inverness 2–1 at Tynecastle.
- 11 November 2020: A 3–2 lead was surrendered against Raith Rovers in the final-minute of a League Cup group game, with the home team taking the bonus point after a 3–2 'win' on penalties, in Kirkcaldy.
- 13 November 2020: The Scottish Government announce that football clubs in Level 1 lockdown areas can have limited attendances. Inverness announce they can safely let 300 fans return for the club's next home game against Raith Rovers - via a ballot system of season ticket holders. The plan will be repeated for the following home game, against Dundee in December.
- 14 November 2020: Inverness edge a 1–0 win over East Fife in the League Cup.
- 21 November 2020: Inverness clinch a 2–0 win against Raith Rovers in front of a restricted group of home fans.
- 24 November 2020: Inverness respond to allegations in the Daily Record, following a headline alleging they had breached COVID Rules, with the club stating that everything was done in accordance with government guidelines.

=== December 2020 ===
- 4 December 2020: Inverness defeat Queen of the South, 3–0.
- 9 December 2020: An Inverness offer to host the 2020 Scottish Cup Final between Celtic and Hearts on 20 December - to allow some Highland-based spectators to attend - is rejected by the SFA.
- 12 December 2020: Inverness and Dundee contest a 2–2 draw, in front of a ballot-selected 300 home fans.
- 18 December 2020: Club Historian, Ian Broadfoot is awarded Life Membership by the Club.
- 19 December 2020: The club succumbs to a 2–1 defeat at the hands of part-time side, Alloa Athletic.
- 26 December 2020: The Scottish Government increases COVID restrictions across the country to Level 4. Inverness and other Highland and Moray clubs can now no longer have limited-capacity attendances.
- 28 December 2020: In a revised format to the Scottish Cup, Inverness are drawn away to Highland League side, Buckie Thistle.
- 30 December 2020: In their last game of 2020, Inverness draw 1–1 with Dunfermline.

=== January 2021 ===
- 2 January 2021: Recent Life Membership recipient and Club Historian, Ian Broadfoot, dies aged 73 after falling ill on Boxing Day.
- 5 January 2021: With the travel restrictions between Inverness and Glasgow, Kai Kennedy cuts-short his loan, citing homesickness. However, he later signs for Championship rivals, Raith Rovers.
- 10 January 2021: The Highland Derby becomes a possibility, as Ross County is drawn against Inverness or Buckie Thistle in the Scottish Cup Third round.
- 11 January 2021: All competitions below the Scottish Championship, including the Scottish Cup, are postponed, with a planned resumption in late-March.
- 31 January 2021: Of six scheduled fixtures for Inverness in January, only one is played, a 2–2 away draw to Greenock Morton.

=== February 2021 ===
- 6/7 February 2021: Inverness are approached by Federation of Hearts Supporters General Secretary, Stevie Kilgour, proposing a 'virtual ticket' scheme as a thank-you for Inverness donating to Hearts in 2013, when the Edinburgh club were experiencing severe financial difficulties. It is reported that 5,000 tickets are sold in the first 24 hours.
- 8 February 2021: Anthony McDonald returns to Inverness after a short spell with Cordoba in Spain's Segunda Division B.
- 9 February 2021: 7,820 virtual tickets are sold, "breaking" the previous attendance record of 7,753 against Rangers in January 2008.
- 19 February 2021: Due to the demand of virtual tickets, the club launches a limited supply of commemorative match programmes.
- 22 February 2021: Manager John Robertson steps down for the remainder of the season on compassionate leave due to a family bereavement. Neil McCann is appointed interim manager the following day.
- 23 February 2021: Inverness draw 2–2 with Alloa.
- 26 February 2021: Virtual ticket sales reach 10,000 on the day of the match against Hearts.
  - The game ends with the runaway league leaders securing a 1–1 draw in Inverness, while the final "attendance" is recorded as 11,356 - exceeding the capacity of the Caledonian Stadium.

=== March 2021 ===
- 2 March 2021: Inverness lose 2–1 to Dundee at Dens Park, leaving the club in 7th place.
- 4 March 2021: James Keatings signs a pre contract agreement with Championship rivals, Raith Rovers.
- 6/10 March 2021: A 1–1 draw with Alloa followed by a 1–0 loss to Greenock Morton, leaves Inverness occupying the relegation play-off spot in the table.
- 12 March 2021: Inverness draw 0–0 against Raith Rovers, moving the club out of the relegation play-off spot, on goal difference.
- 16 March 2021: Inverness secure their second win of 2021, by beating 10-man Raith Rovers - moving the team up to 6th place and within 3 points of the promotion play-off places.
- 20 March 2021: Inverness return to Fife and move up to 5th in the league, with David Carson scoring a late winner against Dunfermline Athletic at East End Park.
- 23 March 2021: Inverness' Scottish Cup game against Buckie Thistle finishes in a 3–2 victory, with Daniel MacKay scoring in the 83rd minute to win the tie and take the club forward to a Highland Derby fixture in the following round.
- 26 March 2021: Defender Lewis Toshney departs the club citing homesickness.
- 27 March 2021: Hibernian midfielder, Scott Allan, joins on-loan until the end of the season. He debuts as a substitute in Inverness' 1–0 win against Arbroath on the same day.

=== April 2021 ===
- 2 April 2021: Inverness progress to the Fourth round of the Scottish Cup, eliminating Highland Derby rivals, Ross County, 3–1 in Dingwall.
- 6 April 2021: Inverness record their sixth consecutive win in all competitions, beating Morton 4–1, in Greenock.
- 10 April 2021: Inverness's winning streak comes to an end after a 1–1 draw away to Queen of the South.
- 13 April 2021: David Carson is named Championship Player of the Month for March 2021.
- 16 April 2021: Inverness's 8 game unbeaten run in all competitions comes to a close with defeat to St Mirren in the Scottish Cup.
- 21 April 2021: 9-man Inverness draw 1–1 with Dundee after a late equalizer by Lee Ashcroft for the visiting Dundonians. Inverness now have to win both their remaining games, and hope for other results to 'go their way', to qualify for the play-offs.
- 24 April 2021: Inverness fail to beat Heart of Midlothian, losing 3–0. Meanwhile, Dundee and Dunfermline secure wins against Raith Rovers and Arbroath respectively, denying a play-off spot for Inverness, who will now finish 5th.
- 30 April 2021: After a year of inactivity, the 2020 Challenge Cup final is cancelled, with Inverness and Raith Rovers 'sharing' the trophy.
  - Inverness finish the season at home with a 2–2 draw against Ayr United.

=== May 2021 ===
- 13 May 2021: Daniel MacKay signs for Hibernian for an undisclosed fee.
- 14 May 2021: John Robertson returns to the club in a 'Director of Sport' role, leaving the managerial position vacant.

== Fixtures and results ==
=== Friendlies ===
26 September 2020 Friendly	Elgin City	3 – 7	Inverness Caledonian Thistle	Elgin
14:00	Hester 29', 70' Bronsky 80'		Keatings 3', 54' Todorov 22' Storey 75', 83' MacGregor 78', 85'	Stadium: Borough Briggs; Attendance: Behind Closed Doors

29 September 2020 Friendly	Nairn County	0 – 7	Inverness Caledonian Thistle	Nairn
19:30			Welsh MacKay Keatings Hyde Storey Harkness Todorov	Stadium: Station Park; Attendance: Behind Closed Doors

2 October 2020 Friendly	Clachnacuddin	0 – 2	Inverness Caledoninan Thistle	Inverness
19:30			Thompson MacKay	Stadium: Grant Street Park; Attendance: Behind Closed Doors

3 October 2020 Friendly	Inverness Caledonian Thistle	1 – 1	Elgin City	Inverness
14:00	Todorov		Hester	Stadium: Caledonian Stadium; Attendance: Behind Closed Doors

=== League ===
The league was cut down to 27 Games from 36 Games in accordance with Government Guidelines on COVID-19 and Social Distancing.

17 October 2020 Championship	Dunfermline Athletic	3 – 1	Inverness Caledonian Thistle	Dunfermline
15:00	Murray 23', Dow 78', McManus 84'		Todorov 2'	Stadium: East End Park

24 October 2020 Championship	Inverness Caledonian Thistle	1 – 1	Ayr United	Inverness
15:00	Todorov 86'		Cameron 57'	Stadium: Caledonian Stadium

31 October 2020 Championship	Inverness Caledonian Thistle	3 – 1	Arbroath	Inverness
15:00	MacKay 47', Allardice 71', Todorov 79'		Doolan 24'	Stadium: Caledonian Stadium

7 November 2020 Championship	Heart of Midlothian	2 – 1	Inverness Caledonian Thistle	Edinburgh
15:00	Naismith 47', Boyce 70'		Doran 86'	Stadium: Tynecastle Stadium

21 November 2020 Championship	Inverness Caledonian Thistle	2 – 0	Raith Rovers	Inverness
15:00	Keatings 19', Allardice 68'			Stadium: Caledonian Stadium; Attendance: 300

5 December 2020 Championship	Queen of the South	0 – 3	Inverness Caledonian Thistle	Dumfries
15:00			Kennedy 21', MacGregor 50', Storey 80'	Stadium: Palmerston Park

12 December 2020 Championship	Inverness Caledonian Thistle	2 – 2	Dundee	Inverness
15:00	Deas 72', Keatings 75'		Fontaine 37', McGhee 82'	Stadium: Caledonian Stadium; Attendance: 300

19 December 2020 Championship	Alloa Athletic	2 – 1	Inverness Caledonian Thistle	Alloa
15:00	Murray 61', Thomson 78'		McKay 7'	Stadium: Indodrill Stadium

26 December 2020 Championship	Greenock Morton	P – P	Inverness Caledonian Thistle	Greenock
15:00				Stadium: Cappielow Park
Note: Postponed due to Waterlogged Pitch

29 December 2020 Championship	Inverness Caledonian Thistle	1 – 1	Dunfermline Athletic	Inverness
19:45	Storey 67'		Turner 23'	Stadium: Caledonian Stadium

2 January 2021 Championship	Arbroath	P – P	Inverness Caledonian Thistle	Arbroath
15:00				Stadium: Gayfield Park

12 January 2021 Championship	Inverness Caledonian Thistle	P – P	Queen of the South	Inverness
18:30				Stadium: Caledonian Stadium
Note: Postponed due to rescheduled Scottish Cup game

16 January 2021 Championship	Raith Rovers	P – P	Inverness Caledonian Thistle	Kirkcaldy
15:00				Stadium: Stark's Park
Note: Postponed due to COVID Outbreak in Raith Staff

23 January 2021 Championship	Inverness Caledonian Thistle	P – P	Alloa Athletic	Inverness
15:00				Stadium: Caledonian Stadium
Note: Postponed due to frozen pitch

27 January 2021 Championship	Greenock Morton	2 – 2	Inverness Caledonian Thistle	Greenock
18:30	McGinty 3', Omar (yellow card) 28' (yellow-red card) , Blues 66'		Sutherland 4', MacKay 15'	Stadium: Cappielow

30 January 2021 Championship	Inverness Caledonian Thistle	P – P	Queen of the South	Inverness
15:00				Stadium: Caledonian Stadium
Note: Postponed due to frozen pitch

3 February 2021 Championship	Arbroath	1 – 1	Inverness Caledonian Thistle	Arbroath
19:45	Hamilton 45'		Sutherland 48'	Stadium: Gayfield Park

6 February 2021 Championship	Dundee	P – P	Inverness Caledonian Thistle	Dundee
15:00				Stadium: Dens Park
Note: Postponed due to waterlogged pitch

10 February 2021 Championship	Inverness Caledonian Thistle	P – P	Alloa Athletic	Inverness
15:00				Stadium: Caledonian Stadium
Note: Postponed due to heavy snowfall overnight

13 February 2021 Championship	Inverness Caledonian Thistle	P – P	Greenock Morton	Inverness
15:00				Stadium: Caledonian Stadium

17 February 2021 Championship	Inverness Caledonian Thistle	0 – 1	Queen of the South	Inverness
18:30			Nortey 63'	Stadium: Caledonian Stadium

20 February 2021 Championship	Ayr United	0 – 2	Inverness Caledonian Thistle	Ayr
15:00			MacKay 31', Sutherland 54'	Stadium: Somerset Park

23 February 2021 Championship	Inverness Caledonian Thistle	2 – 2	Alloa Athletic	Inverness
19:00	Duffy 77'. Keatings 78'		Cameron 20', Trouten (pen.), 87'	Stadium: Caledonian Stadium

26 February 2021 Championship	Inverness Caledonian Thistle	1 – 1	Heart of Midlothian	Inverness
19:45	Storey 10'		Naismith 36'	Stadium: Caledonian Stadium; Attendance: 0 (11,356 Virtual Tickets Sold)
Note: Live on BBC Scotland

2 March 2021 Championship	Dundee	2 – 1	Inverness Caledonian Thistle	Dundee
19:00	Anderson 10', Cummings 45'		Todorov 75'	Stadium: Dens Park

6 March 2021 Championship	Alloa Athletic	1 – 1	Inverness Caledonian Thistle	Alloa
15:00	Cameron 17'		Todorov 27'	Stadium: Indodrill Stadium

9 March 2021 Championship	Inverness Caledonian Thistle	0 – 1	Greenock Morton	Inverness
19:45			Nesbitt	Stadium: Caledonian Stadium

12 March 2021 Championship	Inverness Caledonian Thistle	0 – 0	Raith Rovers	Inverness
19:00				Stadium: Caledonian Stadium

16 March 2021 Championship	Raith Rovers	0 – 1	Inverness Caledonian Thistle	Kirkcaldy
19:00	Davidson (red card) 10'		MacKay 50'	Stadium: Stark's Park

20 March 2021 Championship	Dunfermline Athletic	0 – 1	Inverness Caledonian Thistle	Dunfermline
15:00			Carson 81'	Stadium: East End Park

27 March 2020 Championship	Inverness Caledonian Thistle	1 – 0	Arbroath	Inverness
15:00	Todorov 69'			Stadium: Caledonian Stadium

6 April 2021 Championship	Greenock Morton	1 – 4	Inverness Caledonian Thistle	Greenock
19:00	Muirhead 61'		Allardice 38', Todorov 40', 71', MacKay 80'	Stadium: Cappielow Park

10 April 2021 Championship	Queen of the South	1 – 1	Inverness Caledonian Thistle	Dumfries
15:00	Fitzpatrick 65'		Todorov 68'	Stadium: Palmerston Park

17 April 2021 Championship	Inverness Caledonian Thistle	P – P	Dundee	Inverness
15:00				Stadium: Caledonian Stadium
Note: Postponed due to Scottish Cup 4th Round

20 April 2021 Championship	Inverness Caledonian Thistle	1 – 1	Dundee	Inverness
19:00	Allardice (yellow card) 64' (yellow-red card) , McKay (red card) 79', MacKay 84'		Ashcroft	Stadium: Caledonian Stadium

24 April 2021 Championship	Heart of Midlothian	3 – 0	Inverness Caledonian Thistle	Edinburgh
15:00	Mackay-Steven 6' 31', McEneff 9'			Stadium: Tynecastle Park

30 April 2021 Championship	Inverness Caledonian Thistle	2 – 2	Ayr United	Inverness
19:45	MacKay 6', Welsh (pen.), 47'		Muirhead (pen.), 39', Todd 67'	Stadium: Caledonian Stadium

=== Scottish Cup ===
9 January 2021 Second Round	Buckie Thistle	P – P	inverness Caledonian Thistle	Buckie
15:00				Stadium: Victoria Park
Note: Postponed due to Frozen Pitch

12 January 2021 Second Round	Buckie Thistle	P – P	Inverness Caledonian Thistle	Buckie
20:00				Stadium: Victoria Park
Note: Postponed after Scottish FA called a postponement to all competitions below the Scottish Championship, including the Scottish Cup.

30 January 2021 Third Round	Ross County	P – P	Buckie Thistle or Inverness Caledonian Thistle	Dingwall
15:00				Stadium: Global Energy Stadium
Note: Postponed after Scottish FA called a postponement to all competitions below the Scottish Championship, including the Scottish Cup.

23 March 2021 Second Round	Buckie Thistle	2 – 3	Inverness Caledonian Thistle	Buckie
20:00	Jack Murray 15', Callum Murray 84'		Keatings 2', Welsh 27', MacKay 86'	Stadium: Victoria Park; Attendance: 0

2 April 2021 Third Round	Ross County	1 – 3	Inverness Caledonian Thistle	Dingwall
19:45	McKay 38'		Todorov 40', MacKay 54', Sutherland 87'	Stadium: Global Energy Stadium; Attendance: 0

16 April 2021 Fourth Round	St Mirren	2 – 1	Inverness Caledonian Thistle	Paisley
18:00	Dennis 50', Fraser 89'		Todorov 48'	Stadium: St Mirren Park; Attendance: 0

=== League Cup ===
6 October 2020 League Cup Group A	Heart of Midlothian	1 – 0	Inverness Caledonian Thistle	Edinburgh
19:45	Walker (62 p)			Stadium: Tynecastle
Note: Live on Premier Sports

13 October 2020 League Cup Group A	Inverness Caledonian Thistle	0 – 0 (4 – 2 p)	Cowdenbeath	Inverness
19:45				Stadium: Caledonian Stadium
	Penalties
	Nikolay Todorov (penalty scored) , Robbie Deas (penalty scored) , Sean Welsh (penalty scored) , Scott Allardice (penalty scored)		(penalty missed) Graham Taylor, (penalty scored) Oliver Hamilton, (penalty scored) Harvey Swann, (penalty missed) Kris Renton

10 November 2020 League Cup Group A	Raith Rovers	3 – 3 (3 – 2 p)	Inverness Caledonian Thistle	Kirkcaldy
19:45	Duku 11', 90', Devine (o.g.) 59'		Sutherland 24', Keatings (pen.), 67', MacGregor 69'	Stadium: Stark's Park
	Penalties
	Regan Hendry (penalty scored) , Ross Matthews (penalty scored) , Daniel Armstrong (penalty scored) , Brad Spencer (penalty missed)		(penalty missed) Nikolay Todorov, (penalty missed) James Keatings, (penalty scored) Robbie Deas, (penalty scored) Scott Allardice, (penalty missed) Kai Kennedy

14 November 2020 League Cup Group A	Inverness Caledonian Thistle	1 – 0	East Fife	Inverness
15:00	Sutherland 64'			Stadium: Caledonian Stadium

=== Challenge Cup ===
The Scottish Challenge Cup was unanimously cancelled due to the Coronavirus Pandemic preventing fans from attending - with 34 of the 42 SPFL clubs agreeing it was not financially viable to play the tournament behind closed doors.

=== North of Scotland Cup ===
The North of Scotland Cup was cancelled.

== First team player statistics ==
=== League goalscorers ===
Rank	Player	Goals
1st	(Bulgaria) Nikolay Todorov	9
2nd	(Scotland) Daniel MacKay	6
3rd	(Scotland) Shane Sutherland	3
=	(Scotland) James Keatings	3
=	(England) Miles Storey	3
=	(Scotland) Scott Allardice	3
7th	(Republic of Ireland) Aaron Doran	1
=	(Scotland) Roddy MacGregor	1
=	(Scotland) Kai Kennedy	1
=	(Scotland) Robbie Deas	1
=	(Scotland) Brad McKay	1
=	(Scotland) Wallace Duffy	1
=	(England) David Carson	1
=	(Scotland) Sean Welsh	1

=== Overall goalscorers ===
Rank	Player	Goals
1st	(Bulgaria) Nikolay Todorov	11
2nd	(Scotland) Shane Sutherland	7
=	(Scotland) Daniel Mackay	7
4th	(Scotland) James Keatings	5
5th	(England) Miles Storey	3
=	(Scotland) Scott Allardice	3
7th	(Scotland) Roddy MacGregor	2
=	(Scotland) Sean Welsh	2
9th	(Republic of Ireland) Aaron Doran	1
=	(Scotland) Kai Kennedy	1
=	(Scotland) Robbie Deas	1
=	(Scotland) Brad McKay	1
=	(Scotland) Wallace Duffy	1
=	(England) David Carson	1

*as of match played 30 April 2021

**players in italics left the club during the season, so cannot move up the table

=== Transfers ===
Transfers in
Player	Age*	Pos	From	Fee	Date	Notes
(Scotland) Shane Sutherland	29	FW	(Scotland) Elgin City	Pre-Contract Agreement	16 January 2020	
(Scotland) Robbie Deas	20	DF	(Scotland) Celtic	Free	6 August 2020	
(Scotland) Scott Allardice	22	MF	(Republic of Ireland) Waterford	Undisclosed	13 August 2020	
(Northern Ireland) Danny Devine	27	DF	(Scotland) Dunfermline Athletic	Free	17 August 2020	
(Scotland) Ryan Fyffe	19	DF	Free Agent	Free	11 September 2020	Initially released 30 June 2020
(Scotland) Harry Nicolson	19	DF	Free Agent	Free	11 September 2020	Initially released 30 June 2020
(Scotland) Wallace Duffy	21	DF	(Scotland) St Johnstone	Free	5 October 2020	
(Scotland) Anthony McDonald	19	MF	(Spain) Córdoba CF	Free	8 February 2021	

Transfers out
Player	Age*	Pos	To	Fee	Date	Notes
(Scotland) Shaun Rooney	23	DF	(Scotland) St Johnstone	Pre-Contract Agreement	30 January 2020	
(Scotland) Jordan White	28	ST	(Scotland) Motherwell	Pre-Contract Agreement	January 2020	
(Canada) Charlie Trafford	28	MF	(Scotland) Hamilton Academical	Free	29 June 2020	
(Scotland) Ryan Fyffe	19	DF	Free Agent	Released	30 June 2020	Resigned 11 September 2020
(Scotland) Harry Nicolson	19	DF	Free Agent	Released	30 June 2020	Resigned 11 September 2020
(Brazil) Matheus Machado	18	MF	(Portugal) Rio Ave	Free	1 July 2020	
(Scotland) Daniel Hoban	22	GK	(Scotland) Forfar Athletic	Free	11 July 2020	
(England) Carl Tremarco	34	DF	(Scotland) Ross County	Free	16 July 2020	
(Scotland) Tom Walsh	23	MF	(Scotland) Ayr United	Free	6 August 2020	
(Scotland) Jack Brown	19	MF	(Scotland) Rothes	Free	5 October 2020	
(Scotland) Roddy Kennedy	19	ST	(Scotland) Strathspey Thistle	Free	11 October 2020	
(Scotland) Donald Morrison	18	DF	(Scotland) Dumbarton	Free	16 October 2020	
(Scotland) Gabriel Hastings	19	DF	(Scotland) Strathspey Thistle	Free	20 November 2020	
(Scotland) Ross Gunn	19	MF	(Scotland) Rothes	Free	26 November 2020	
(Scotland) Lewis Toshney	28	DF	(Scotland) Downfield	Mutual Consent	21 April 2021	

Loans in/return
Player	Age*	Pos	From	Duration	Date In	Date Out	Notes
(Scotland) Kai Kennedy	18	FW	(Scotland) Rangers	Half Season	4 October 2020	5 January 2021	
(Scotland) Arron Lyall	17	MF	(Scotland) Rangers	Half Season	22 March 2021	1 July 2021	
(Scotland) Scott Allan	29	MF	(Scotland) Hibernian	Half Season	27 March 2021	1 July 2021	

Loans out/return
Player	Age*	Pos	To	Duration	Date Out	Date In	Notes
(Scotland) Shane Harkness	18	FW	(Scotland) Rothes	2 Months	26 November 2020	January 2021	
(Scotland) Lewis Hyde	18	MF	(Scotland) Rothes	1 Month	10 December 2020	January 2021	
(Scotland) Ryan Fyffe	18	DF	(Scotland) Clachnacuddin	1 Month	11 December 2020	January 2021	
(Scotland) Martin MacKinnon	20	GK	(Scotland) Buckie Thistle	1 Month	18 December 2020	January 2021	
(Scotland) Kai Kennedy	18	FW	(Scotland) Rangers	Return	5 January 2021	N/A	

*at time of transfer/loan
