= Lewis Nicolson =

Scottish footballer

Personal information
- Date of birth: 5 May 2004 (age 22)
- Place of birth: Inverness, Scotland
- Height: 1.72 m (5 ft 8 in)
- Position: Left-back

Youth career
- –2021: Inverness Caledonian Thistle

Senior career*
Years	Team	Apps	(Gls)
2021–2025	Inverness Caledonian Thistle	8	(2)
2021–2022	→ Clachnacuddin (loan)		
2022–2023	→ Elgin City (loan)	9	(0)
Total		17	(2)
- * Club domestic league appearances and goals as of 17:33, 22 May 2025 (UTC)

Lewis Nicolson (born 5 May 2004) is a Scottish former professional footballer who played as a left-back for Inverness Caledonian Thistle, Clachnacuddin and Elgin City.

== Club career ==
Nicolson started his career rising through the youth ranks at Inverness Caledonian Thistle, before joining the first team on 1 July 2021.

Nicolson made his first team debut on 29 January 2022 coming on as a late substitute for Cameron Harper in a 1–0 away loss to Kilmarnock. He scored his first, and the only goal in a 1–2 home loss to Ayr United on 19 February 2022.

On 16 August 2022, Nicolson moved to Elgin City on a half season loan, making his debut a few days later in a 2–2 draw at home to Stranraer. On 29 October 2022, Nicolson received his first red card of his career, coming in the 7th minute of a 2–1 away defeat to East Fife.

In January 2023, Nicolson was recalled from his loan to Elgin due to an injury crisis at Inverness. He made his return to the team the following day, coming on in a 6–1 home win over Cove Rangers in the Scottish Championship.

On 22 May 2025, Nicolson announced that he was stepping away from football due to multiple injuries and subsequent operations impacting his career, choosing to prioritise his long term health.
