= Ethan Cairns =

Scottish professional footballer

Personal information
- Full name: Ethan John Cairns
- Date of birth: 17 December 2004 (age 21)
- Place of birth: Grantown-on-Spey, Scotland
- Position: Forward

Team information
- Current team: Inverurie Loco Works

Youth career
- 2014–2021: Inverness Caledonian Thistle

Senior career*
Years	Team	Apps	(Gls)
2021–2025	Inverness Caledonian Thistle	20	(1)
2021	→ Strathspey Thistle (loan)	8	(0)
2022	→ Fort William (loan)	6	(1)
2022–2023	→ Forres Mechanics (loan)	23	(4)
2023–2024	→ Forres Mechanics (loan)	1	(0)
2024	→ Banks o' Dee (loan)	2	(1)
2025–	Inverurie Loco Works	25	(2)
- * Club domestic league appearances and goals as of 22:19, 4 March 2026 (UTC)

Ethan Cairns (born 17 December 2004) is a Scottish footballer who plays as a striker for Highland League side, Inverurie Loco Works.

Cairns is the younger brother of Owen Cairns, who plays as a defender for Elgin City.

== Career ==
Cairns came through the Inverness Caledonian Thistle Academy, before being sent out on loan to his hometown side, Strathspey Thistle, as well as Fort William, and finally, Forres Mechanics before being recalled from his Forres loan due to an injury crisis going on at Inverness.

On 2 January 2023, Cairns made his debut for Inverness, coming on in a 6–1 win over Cove Rangers in the Scottish Championship. On 4 February, Cairns scored his first goal for Inverness in a 2–2 league draw with Greenock Morton immediately after being subbed on for fellow academy graduate, Daniel MacKay. In July 2023, Cairns returned to Forres on a short term loan, before joining Aberdeen side, Banks o' Dee in January 2024.

Following the end of the 2024–25 season, Cairns left Inverness.

In June 2025, Cairns signed for Inverurie Loco Works in the Highland League.
