= 2022–23 Scottish Cup =

Tournament details
- Country: Scotland
- Dates: 26 August 2022 – 3 June 2023
- Teams: 126

Final positions
- Champions: Celtic
- Runners-up: Inverness Caledonian Thistle

Tournament statistics
- Matches played: 127
- Goals scored: 473 (3.72 per match)
- Top goal scorer(s): David Grant (Dunipace) (12 goals)

The 2022–23 Scottish Cup was the 138th season of Scotland's most prestigious football knockout competition.

The defending champions, Rangers, who beat Heart of Midlothian in the 2022 Scottish Cup final, were defeated by Celtic in the semi-finals. VAR was used for the first time in the tournament.

Celtic lifted the trophy for the record-extending 41st time after defeating Inverness Caledonian Thistle 3–1 in the final to complete a domestic treble.

== Calendar ==
The calendar for the 2022–23 Scottish Cup was announced by the Scottish Football Association on 29 July 2022. Starting this season, replays were abolished after the preliminary round. From the first round, matches tied after 90 minutes will go to extra time, and if still tied, to penalty kicks.

| Round | Original date | Number of fixtures | Clubs | New Entries | Leagues entering at this round |
|---|---|---|---|---|---|
| Preliminary round | 27 August 2022 | 24 | 126 → 102 | 50 | 46 licensed clubs and 4 qualifiers |
| First round | 17 September 2022 | 30 | 102 → 72 | 34 | 18 Highland League teams 16 Lowland League teams |
| Second round | 22 October 2022 | 20 | 72 → 52 | 10 | 10 League Two teams |
| Third round | 26 November 2022 | 20 | 52 → 32 | 20 | 10 Championship teams 10 League One teams |
| Fourth round | 21 January 2023 | 16 | 32 → 16 | 12 | 12 Premiership teams |
| Fifth round | 11 February 2023 | 8 | 16 → 8 | None | |
| Quarter-finals | 11 March 2023 | 4 | 8 → 4 | None | |
| Semi-finals | 29 & 30 April 2023 | 2 | 4 → 2 | None | |
| Final | 3 June 2023 | 1 | 2 → 1 | None | |

== Preliminary round ==
The preliminary round took place on the weekend of 27 August 2022. In total, 50 clubs entered the competition at this stage. They were drawn into 24 ties, with two clubs receiving a bye to the first round.

Benburb, Bonnyton Thistle, Kilwinning Rangers, Rutherglen Glencairn, St Andrews United, Syngenta, and Tayport took part for the first time, along with Lochee United and Pollok who were qualifiers in previous seasons, having each gained their Club Licence.

Carnoustie Panmure (Midlands League champions), Drumchapel United (East, South and West of Scotland Cup-Winners Shield winners), Invergordon (North Caledonian League champions), and Tower Hearts (Amateur Cup winners) also qualified to take part in the competition for the first time.

=== Draw ===
The draw for the preliminary round was made on 2 August 2022. Two clubs, except the four qualifiers (Carnoustie Panmure, Drumchapel United, Invergordon, or Tower Hearts), were eligible to receive a bye to the first round. Teams in bold advanced to the first round.

| East of Scotland League | West of Scotland League | Others |
|---|---|---|
| Premier Division: Blackburn United; **Broxburn Athletic**; **Dundonald Bluebell**; Haddington Athletic; **Hill of Beath Hawthorn**; **Jeanfield Swifts**; **Linlithgow Rose**; **Lothian Thistle Hutchison Vale**; **Musselburgh Athletic**; Penicuik Athletic; **Sauchie Juniors**; **Tynecastle**; Vale of Leithen; First Division: Burntisland Shipyard; **Camelon Juniors**; Coldstream; **Dunbar United**; **Dunipace**; **Newtongrange Star**; Preston Athletic; Whitehill Welfare; Second Division: Dalkeith Thistle; Easthouses Lily Miners Welfare; Hawick Royal Albert; St Andrews United; **Syngenta** | Premier Division: **Auchinleck Talbot**; **Clydebank**; **Cumnock Juniors**; **Darvel**; Irvine Meadow; **Kilwinning Rangers**; **Pollok**; First Division: **Benburb**; Bonnyton Thistle; **Drumchapel United**; Rutherglen Glencairn; Second Division: **Glasgow University**; Third Division: Girvan; Fourth Division: Threave Rovers | Central Scottish Amateur League: Tower Hearts; Midlands League: **Carnoustie Panmure**; **Lochee United**; Tayport; North Caledonian League: Fort William; Golspie Sutherland; Invergordon; South of Scotland League: **Newton Stewart**; St Cuthbert Wanderers; Wigtown & Bladnoch |

Jeanfield Swifts and Tynecastle received a bye to the first round.

=== Matches ===
| 26 August 2022 | **Syngenta** | **1–0** | Threave Rovers | Stenhousemuir |
| 20:00 | Fotheringham 16' | | | Stadium: Ochilview Park; Attendance: 320; Referee: Greg Soutar |

| 27 August 2022 | Tower Hearts | **w/o** | **Cumnock Juniors** | Glasgow |
| 14:00 | | | | Stadium: McKenna Park; Referee: Gary Hanvidge |

| 27 August 2022 | Rutherglen Glencairn | **2–2** | Kilwinning Rangers | Rutherglen |
| 14:00 | McIlveen 70', 73' | | Millar 18', 89' | Stadium: Hamish B Allan Stadium; Attendance: 400; Referee: Jordan Curran |

| 27 August 2022 | Whitehill Welfare | **1–4** | **Camelon Juniors** | Rosewell |
| 14:30 | Weir 67' | | Taylor 18', 65', 81'; Bevan 38' | Stadium: Ferguson Park; Attendance: 95; Referee: Colin Whyte |

| 27 August 2022 | **Drumchapel United** | **3–0** | Easthouses Lily Miners Welfare | Glasgow |
| 14:30 | Geggan 12'; Docherty 58'; Hardie 61' | | | Stadium: Donald Dewar Centre; Attendance: 250; Referee: Euan Birch |

| 27 August 2022 | Penicuik Athletic | **0–1** | **Musselburgh Athletic** | Penicuik |
| 14:30 | | | Smith 68' | Stadium: Penicuik Park; Attendance: 341; Referee: Steven Reid |

| 27 August 2022 | **Clydebank** | **4–1** | Bonnyton Thistle | Clydebank |
| 15:00 | Weir 34', 56'; Little 48', 90' | | Patterson 8' | Stadium: Holm Park; Attendance: 585; Referee: Mark Harris |

| 27 August 2022 | Haddington Athletic | **1–3** | **Darvel** | Haddington |
| 15:00 | King 5' | | McShane 51'; Morrison 53'; MacKenzie 64' | Stadium: Millfield Park; Attendance: 337; Referee: Daniel Graves |

| 27 August 2022 | **Auchinleck Talbot** | **7–0** | Coldstream | Auchinleck |
| 15:00 | Samson 6'; Taylor 7', 16', 69'; Boylan 71'; Glasgow 81'; Mason 87' | | | Stadium: Beechwood Park; Attendance: 440; Referee: Alex Shepherd |

| 27 August 2022 | Dalkeith Thistle | **1–3** | **Lochee United** | Dalkeith |
| 15:00 | Woodcock 50' | | Kirk 47'; Hay 75'; Johnston 78' | Stadium: King's Park; Attendance: 107; Referee: Ross Birrell |

| 27 August 2022 | Irvine Meadow | **1–1** | Hill of Beath Hawthorn | Irvine |
| 15:00 | Gow 62' | | Fleming 11' | Stadium: Meadow Park; Attendance: 251; Referee: Alastair Grieve |

| 27 August 2022 | **Linlithgow Rose** | **9–0** | St Cuthbert Wanderers | Linlithgow |
| 15:00 | McMullan 4'; Stowe 7', 20', 24', 37', 47', 89'; Renwick 66' (o.g.); Cunningham 84' | | | Stadium: Prestonfield; Attendance: 320; Referee: Sean Murdoch |

| 27 August 2022 | **Broxburn Athletic** | **3–0** | Blackburn United | Broxburn |
| 15:00 | Brass 17'; Churchill 82'; Binnie 86' | | | Stadium: Albyn Park; Attendance: 313; Referee: Ross Clark |

| 27 August 2022 | **Sauchie Juniors** | **4–2** | St Andrews United | Sauchie |
| 15:00 | Docherty 15'; Smith 43'; Kavanagh 50'; Kelly 75' | | Sawers 6'; Reekie 47' | Stadium: Beechwood Park; Attendance: 230; Referee: Andy Gamble |

| 27 August 2022 | Invergordon | **1–5** | **Newtongrange Star** | Dingwall |
| 15:00 | Lockett 32' | | Robertson 3', 21', 86'; McIntosh 11', 53' | Stadium: Victoria Park; Attendance: 145; Referee: Chris Gentles |

| 27 August 2022 | Vale of Leithen | **0–2** | **Dunbar United** | Innerleithen |
| 15:00 | | | Smith 28'; Miller 90+2' | Stadium: Victoria Park; Attendance: 107; Referee: Ryan Kennedy |

| 27 August 2022 | Preston Athletic | **0–1** | **Newton Stewart** | Prestonpans |
| 15:00 | | | Whyte 90' | Stadium: Pennypit Park; Attendance: 110; Referee: Joel Kennedy |

| 27 August 2022 | Wigtown & Bladnoch | **0–12** | **Dunipace** | Wigtown |
| 15:00 | | | Birse 15' (o.g.); Grant 22', 27', 52', 57', 65', 68', 70', 72', 75'; Wright 24'; Fleming 45' | Stadium: Trammondford Park; Attendance: 80; Referee: Steven MacDonald |

| 27 August 2022 | Fort William | **0–4** | **Benburb** | Fort William |
| 15:00 | | | Brennan 5'; Black 19', 58'; McTaggart 75' | Stadium: Claggan Park; Attendance: 200; Referee: Ryan Lee |

| 27 August 2022 | **Dundonald Bluebell** | **3–1** | Tayport | Cardenden |
| 15:00 | L. McKenzie 2'; Rogerson 45'; Canha 51' | | D. McKenzie 25' | Stadium: Moorside Park; Attendance: 222; Referee: Duncan Nicolson |

| 27 August 2022 | Carnoustie Panmure | **1–1** | Hawick Royal Albert | Carnoustie |
| 15:00 | Fraser 35' | | To 75' | Stadium: Laing Park; Attendance: 228; Referee: Michael McCart |

| 27 August 2022 | **Pollok** | **6–0** | Girvan | Glasgow |
| 15:00 | McCann 22', 25', 50'; Burns 37'; Forde 57'; Lyon 60' | | | Stadium: Newlandsfield Park; Attendance: 608; Referee: Harry Bruce |

| 27 August 2022 | Burntisland Shipyard | **1–5** | **Lothian Thistle Hutchison Vale** | Burntisland |
| 15:00 | B. Anthony 45' | | Wringe 3'; J. Viola 5', 90'; B. Viola 36'; Findlay 90' | Stadium: Recreation Park; Attendance: 134; Referee: Terry Ormiston |

| 27 August 2022 | **Glasgow University** | **2–0** | Golspie Sutherland | Airdrie |
| 16:30 | Sisi 7'; Davidson 21' | | | Stadium: Excelsior Stadium; Attendance: 44; Referee: Calum Haswell |

=== Replays ===
| 3 September 2022 | **Kilwinning Rangers** | **2–1** | Rutherglen Glencairn | Kilwinning |
| 14:00 | Mackin 3', 24' | | McManus 59' | Stadium: Buffs Park; Attendance: 120; Referee: Jordan Curran |

| 3 September 2022 | **Hill of Beath Hawthorn** | **3–0** | Irvine Meadow | Hill of Beath |
| 15:00 | Allum 34', 44'; Adamson 79' | | | Stadium: Keir's Park; Attendance: 250; Referee: Alastair Grieve |

| 3 September 2022 | Hawick Royal Albert | **0–3** | **Carnoustie Panmure** | Hawick |
| 15:00 | | | Martin 19'; Winter 68'; Reid 90' | Stadium: Albert Park; Attendance: 102; Referee: Gary Hanvidge |

== First round ==
The first round took place on the weekend of 17 September 2022. Along with the 26 teams advancing from the preliminary round, there were 34 new entries at this stage - 18 from the Highland Football League and 16 from the Lowland Football League. The draw for the first round was made on 29 August 2022 at 15:00.

Teams in bold advanced to the second round.

| Highland League | Lowland League | East of Scotland League | West of Scotland League | Other |
|---|---|---|---|---|
| Banks O' Dee; **Brechin City**; Brora Rangers; **Buckie Thistle**; Clachnacuddin; Deveronvale; **Formartine United**; Forres Mechanics; **Fraserburgh**; Huntly; Inverurie Loco Works; Keith; Lossiemouth; Nairn County; Rothes; Strathspey Thistle; **Turriff United**; **Wick Academy** | Berwick Rangers; **Bo'ness United**; **Broomhill**; **Caledonian Braves**; Civil Service Strollers; Cowdenbeath; Cumbernauld Colts; **Dalbeattie Star**; **East Kilbride**; East Stirlingshire; Edinburgh University; Gala Fairydean Rovers; **Gretna 2008**; **The Spartans**; Tranent Juniors; **University of Stirling** | Premier Division: Broxburn Athletic; Dundonald Bluebell; **Hill of Beath Hawthorn**; Jeanfield Swifts; **Linlithgow Rose**; Lothian Thistle Hutchison Vale; Musselburgh Athletic; **Sauchie Juniors**; Tynecastle; First Division: **Camelon Juniors**; **Dunbar United**; **Dunipace**; **Newtongrange Star**; Second Division: Syngenta | Premier Division: **Auchinleck Talbot**; Clydebank; **Cumnock Juniors**; **Darvel**; **Kilwinning Rangers**; **Pollok**; First Division: **Benburb**; **Drumchapel United**; Second Division: **Glasgow University** | Midlands League: **Carnoustie Panmure**; Lochee United; South of Scotland League: Newton Stewart |

Pollok's match against Huntly on 16 September 2022 was originally to be aired on BBC Scotland but the broadcaster pulled out citing an "exceptional demand" on their resources following the death of Elizabeth II.

=== Matches ===
| 16 September 2022 | **Broomhill** | **3–2** (a.e.t.) | Brora Rangers | Cumbernauld |
| 19:45 | Semple 19'; Maley 88'; Cook 98' (pen.) | | Dingwall 83'; MacLean 90' | Stadium: Broadwood Stadium; Attendance: 1,550; Referee: Sean Murdoch |

| 16 September 2022 | **Pollok** | **6–0** | Huntly | Glasgow |
| 19:45 | McCann 14'; Christie 17', 64'; Brownlie 68'; Lyon 79'; Forde 83' | | | Stadium: Newlandsfield Park; Attendance: 874; Referee: Iain Snedden |

| 16 September 2022 | Syngenta | **2–4** | **Auchinleck Talbot** | Stenhousemuir |
| 20:00 | Fotheringham 5'; Sheridan 73' | | Mason 31'; Samson 45', 62'; Glasgow 89' | Stadium: Ochilview Park; Attendance: 750; Referee: Euan Birch |

| 17 September 2022 | Jeanfield Swifts | **1–5** | **Brechin City** | Perth |
| 12:30 | Cooney 74' (o.g.) | | McGrath 50', 90'; Spark 62'; McDonald 69'; Northcott 88' | Stadium: Riverside Stadium; Attendance: 365; Referee: Regan Wallace |

| 17 September 2022 | **Darvel** | **8–0** | Tynecastle | Darvel |
| 14:30 | Meggatt 19'; Truesdale 30'; Morrison 34'; MacKenzie 45'; Miller 56'; Reilly 64'; Allan 83'; Moore 89' | | | Stadium: Recreation Park; Attendance: 375; Referee: Gary Hanvidge |

| 17 September 2022 | **Gretna 2008** | **3–1** | Edinburgh University | Gretna |
| 15:00 | Helm 15'; Currie 24', 57' | | Foster 12' | Stadium: Raydale Park; Referee: Robin Taylor |

| 17 September 2022 | Cumbernauld Colts | **0–1** | **Dalbeattie Star** | Cumbernauld |
| 15:00 | | | Taylor 27' | Stadium: Broadwood Stadium; Referee: Harry Bruce |

| 17 September 2022 | Musselburgh Athletic | **1–2** (a.e.t.) | **Newtongrange Star** | Musselburgh |
| 15:00 | Smith 35' | | Ferguson 19'; McIntosh 116' | Stadium: Olivebank Stadium; Attendance: 506; Referee: Andy Gamble |

| 17 September 2022 | Forres Mechanics | **2–3** | **Glasgow University** | Forres |
| 15:00 | Fraser 34'; MacLeman 45' | | Wight 22'; Sisi 42'; Davidson 84' | Stadium: Mosset Park; Referee: Andrew Bryson |

| 17 September 2022 | Gala Fairydean Rovers | **1–4** | **Sauchie Juniors** | Galashiels |
| 15:00 | Murray 24' | | Collumbine 5', 42'; Kavanagh 71', 73' | Stadium: Netherdale; Referee: Duncan Nicolson |

| 17 September 2022 | Keith | **1–2** | **Cumnock Juniors** | Keith |
| 15:00 | Tough 41' | | Moore 29'; Ferry 50' | Stadium: Kynoch Park; Referee: Greg Soutar |

| 17 September 2022 | **Benburb** | **4–2** | Dundonald Bluebell | Glasgow |
| 15:00 | Lovering 4'; McDonald 45'; McTaggart 90'; McCrone 90' | | Sibanda 17'; Lumsden 33' | Stadium: New Tinto Park; Attendance: 200; Referee: Ross Hardie |

| 17 September 2022 | Banks O' Dee | **4–0** **(void)** | **Turriff United** | Aberdeen |
| 15:00 | Gauld 58'; Winton 74'; MacLeod 81'; Crosbie 90+3' | | | Stadium: Spain Park; Referee: Brent Falconer |

| 17 September 2022 | **Kilwinning Rangers** | **4–2** | Tranent Juniors | Kilwinning |
| 15:00 | Lamont 39'; Mackin 43', 58'; Wood 50' | | Rutherford 17'; Miller 21' | Stadium: Buffs Park; Attendance: 299; Referee: Alex Shepherd |

| 17 September 2022 | Strathspey Thistle | **0–5** | **Camelon Juniors** | Grantown-on-Spey |
| 15:00 | | | Taylor 31', 55', 90'; Anderson 62'; McArthur 90+2' | Stadium: Seafield Park; Referee: Ross Menzies |

| 17 September 2022 | **Formartine United** | **3–1** | East Stirlingshire | Pitmedden |
| 15:00 | Coutts 50' (o.g.); Adams 51'; Norris 76' | | Kay 32' | Stadium: North Lodge Park; Attendance: 227; Referee: Ryan Lee |

| 17 September 2022 | **Carnoustie Panmure** | **3–1** | Rothes | Carnoustie |
| 15:00 | MacDonald 8'; Reid 13', 23' | | MacKay 30' | Stadium: Laing Park; Attendance: 218; Referee: Mike Roncone |

| 17 September 2022 | **Wick Academy** | **5–1** | Lochee United | Wick |
| 15:00 | Halliday 34'; Campbell 41'; Macadie 44'; MacNab 56'; Munro 87' | | Davie 21' | Stadium: Harmsworth Park; Referee: Graham Beaton |

| 17 September 2022 | Civil Service Strollers | **1–2** | **Fraserburgh** | Edinburgh |
| 15:00 | Duffy 71' | | Wood 6'; Butcher 28' | Stadium: Christie Gillies Park; Attendance: 162; Referee: Calum Haswell |

| 17 September 2022 | **Linlithgow Rose** | **2–1** | Berwick Rangers | Linlithgow |
| 15:00 | McMullan 16'; McKenzie 90' | | Ferguson 74' | Stadium: Prestonfield; Attendance: 534; Referee: Steven MacDonald |

| 17 September 2022 | Lossiemouth | **1–2** | **Buckie Thistle** | Lossiemouth |
| 15:00 | Archibald 54' | | Goodall 6', 17' | Stadium: Grant Park; Referee: Ross Clark |

| 17 September 2022 | Nairn County | **1–3** | **Drumchapel United** | Nairn |
| 15:00 | Greig 78' | | Grehan 9'; Docherty 45'; Finnigan 74' | Stadium: Station Park; Referee: Frazer Bushell |

| 17 September 2022 | Cowdenbeath | **0–1** | **Bo'ness United** | Cowdenbeath |
| 15:00 | | | Jones 52' | Stadium: Central Park; Attendance: 255; Referee: Ross Birrell |

| 17 September 2022 | **Dunbar United** | **3–2** (a.e.t.) | Clachnacuddin | Dunbar |
| 15:00 | Berry 42'; Dawson 44'; Congalton 105' | | Brindle 38'; Riddle 85' | Stadium: New Countess Park; Attendance: 432; Referee: George Calder |

| 17 September 2022 | **Dunipace** | **1–1** (a.e.t.) (**4–2** p) | Broxburn Athletic | Denny |
| 15:00 | McGuckin 11' | | Brass 27' | Stadium: Westfield Park; Attendance: 182; Referee: Lee Robertson |

| 17 September 2022 | **Caledonian Braves** | **6–1** | Newton Stewart | Motherwell |
| 15:00 | McNeil 17', 65', 68'; Walker 56'; McDowall 58'; Main 71' | | Drysdale 7' | Stadium: Alliance Park; Attendance: 84; Referee: Daniel Graves |

| 17 September 2022 | Deveronvale | **2–4** | **East Kilbride** | Banff |
| 15:00 | McKay 37'; Ballard 85' | | Elliott 7'; Hughes 60'; McGuire 82', 90' | Stadium: Princess Royal Park; Referee: Gordon Seago |

| 17 September 2022 | Clydebank | **1–3** | **The Spartans** | Clydebank |
| 15:00 | Slattery 31' | | Allan 69'; Armstrong 75'; Burns 87' | Stadium: Holm Park; Attendance: 555; Referee: Ryan Kennedy |

| 17 September 2022 | **Hill of Beath Hawthorn** | **3–1** | Inverurie Loco Works | Hill of Beath |
| 15:00 | Adamson 27'; Allum 39'; Galloway 76' | | Souter 21' | Stadium: Keir's Park; Attendance: 191; Referee: Mark Harris |

| 18 September 2022 | **University of Stirling** | **3–0** | Lothian Thistle Hutchison Vale | Stirling |
| 15:00 | Jarvis 73', 90'; McKinley 89' | | | Stadium: Forthbank Stadium; Attendance: 120; Referee: Joel Kennedy |

Notes

1. A- Banks o' Dee fielded an ineligible player in their first round match against Turriff United and were removed from the competition. The match had originally finished 4–0 to Banks o' Dee.

== Second round ==
The second round took place on the weekend of 22 October 2022. Along with the 30 winners from the first round, there were 10 new entries at this stage - all from League Two. The draw for the second round was made on 18 September 2022 at 18:00, live on the Scottish Cup YouTube, Facebook and Twitter pages.

Teams in bold advanced to the third round.

| League Two | Highland League | Lowland League | East of Scotland League | West of Scotland League | Other |
|---|---|---|---|---|---|
| **Albion Rovers**; Annan Athletic; Bonnyrigg Rose Athletic; **Dumbarton**; East Fife; **Elgin City**; **Forfar Athletic**; **Stenhousemuir**; **Stirling Albion**; Stranraer | Brechin City; Buckie Thistle; **Formartine United**; **Fraserburgh**; Turriff United; **Wick Academy** | Bo'ness United; **Broomhill**; Caledonian Braves; Dalbeattie Star; **East Kilbride**; Gretna 2008; The Spartans; **University of Stirling** | Premier Division: **Hill of Beath Hawthorn**; **Linlithgow Rose**; **Sauchie Juniors**; First Division: Camelon Juniors; Dunbar United; **Dunipace**; Newtongrange Star | Premier Division: **Auchinleck Talbot**; Cumnock Juniors; **Darvel**; Kilwinning Rangers; **Pollok**; First Division: Benburb; **Drumchapel United**; Second Division: Glasgow University | Midlands League: Carnoustie Panmure |

=== Matches ===
| 21 October 2022 | Cumnock Juniors | **1–3** | **Dumbarton** | Cumnock |
| 19:45 | Carnwath 50' | | Carswell 28' (pen.); Buchanan 77'; Gray 90' | Stadium: Townhead Park; Attendance: 1000; Referee: Dan McFarlane |

| 22 October 2022 | Brechin City | **2–2** (a.e.t.) (**7–8** p) | **Stirling Albion** | Brechin |
| 14:00 | McHattie 11'; McGrath 36' | | McLean 20'; McGregor 45' | Stadium: Glebe Park; Attendance: 470; Referee: Alex Shepherd |
| | **Penalties** |
| | Inglis (penalty scored); McGrath (penalty missed); Lowden (penalty scored); McArthur (penalty scored); Cruickshank (penalty scored); Spark (penalty scored); McHattie (penalty scored); Northcroft (penalty scored); Cooney (penalty missed) | | (penalty missed) Carrick; (penalty scored) Burns; (penalty scored) Banner; (penalty scored) Fotheringham; (penalty scored) C. Clark; (penalty scored) Cummins; (penalty scored) Davidson; (penalty scored) H. Clark; (penalty scored) Cooper |

| 22 October 2022 | Bo'ness United | **1–1** (a.e.t.) (**3–5** p) | **Auchinleck Talbot** | Bo'ness |
| 15:00 | Gemmell 5' | | Park 52' | Stadium: Newtown Park; Referee: Ryan Kennedy |
| | **Penalties** |
| | Grant (penalty scored); Walker (penalty missed); Stevenson (penalty scored); Hamilton (penalty scored) | | (penalty scored) Boylan; (penalty scored) Wilson; (penalty scored) Armstrong; (penalty scored) Taylor; (penalty scored) Wardrope |

| 22 October 2022 | Newtongrange Star | **0–1** | **Hill of Beath Hawthorn** | Newtongrange |
| 15:00 | | | Allum 52' | Stadium: New Victoria Park; Attendance: 341; Referee: Ross Birrell |

| 22 October 2022 | Kilwinning Rangers | **1–3** | **Forfar Athletic** | Kilwinning |
| 15:00 | Collins 89' | | Brindley 26'; Gordon 64' (o.g.); Aitken 90' | Stadium: Buffs Park; Attendance: 668; Referee: Daniel Graves |

| 22 October 2022 | **Dunipace** | **5–2** | Turriff United | Denny |
| 15:00 | Morrison 51'; Grant 62', 65', 89'; McGuckin 85' | | Reid 19', 58' | Stadium: Westfield Park; Referee: Ross Clark |

| 22 October 2022 | Dalbeattie Star | **1–7** | **Darvel** | Dalbeattie |
| 15:00 | Degnan 12' | | Robertson 10'; McGowan 14'; Meggatt 31'; MacKenzie 54', 81', 87'; Morrison 89' | Stadium: Islecroft Stadium; Referee: Ryan Lee |

| 22 October 2022 | **Elgin City** | **4–0** | Camelon Juniors | Elgin |
| 15:00 | Hester 10', 24', 45', 71' | | | Stadium: Borough Briggs; Attendance: 513; Referee: Jordan Curran |

| 22 October 2022 | **East Kilbride** | **5–0** | Caledonian Braves | East Kilbride |
| 15:00 | McLaughlin 2', 84'; Munro 52'; MacDonald 63'; Taylor 82' | | | Stadium: K-Park Training Academy; Attendance: 266; Referee: Andrew Craven |

| 22 October 2022 | **Sauchie Juniors** | **3–2** | Bonnyrigg Rose | Sauchie |
| 15:00 | Davidson 21'; Collumbine 37'; Hutchison 43' | | McGachie 42'; Khan 90' | Stadium: Beechwood Park; Attendance: 480; Referee: Greg Soutar |

| 22 October 2022 | **Wick Academy** | **2–0** | Benburb | Wick |
| 15:00 | Campbell 26'; MacNab 82' | | | Stadium: Harmsworth Park; Referee: Calum Haswell |

| 22 October 2022 | **Stenhousemuir** | **2–1** | East Fife | Stenhousemuir |
| 15:00 | Corbett 3'; Yates 31' | | Healy 6' | Stadium: Ochilview Park; Referee: George Calder |

| 22 October 2022 | **Fraserburgh** | **2–1** | Stranraer | Fraserburgh |
| 15:00 | Buchan 6'; Wood 57' | | Girvan 21' | Stadium: Bellslea Park; Referee: Alastair Grieve |

| 22 October 2022 | Gretna 2008 | **1–4** | **Drumchapel United** | Gretna |
| 15:00 | Bell 47' | | Grehan 5', 18'; Hardie 66'; Orr 70' | Stadium: Raydale Park; Attendance: 204; Referee: Blair Fraser |

| 22 October 2022 | **Linlithgow Rose** | **4–0** | The Spartans | Linlithgow |
| 15:00 | Stowe 40', 53'; Heaver 45'; Baxter 85' | | | Stadium: Prestonfield; Attendance: 800; Referee: Joel Kennedy |

| 22 October 2022 | Carnoustie Panmure | **1–2** | **Formartine United** | Carnoustie |
| 15:00 | Suttie 59' | | MacIver 61'; Wade 81' | Stadium: Laing Park; Attendance: 416; Referee: Gary Hanvidge |

| 22 October 2022 | Glasgow University | **1–4** (a.e.t.) | **Albion Rovers** | Airdrie |
| 15:00 | Murray 48' | | Wilson 20'; Reilly 102'; Testa 106'; Reid 114' (o.g.) | Stadium: Excelsior Stadium; Referee: Colin Whyte |

| 22 October 2022 | Buckie Thistle | **1–3** | **Broomhill** | Buckie |
| 15:00 | Goodall 75' | | Watson 11'; Maley 73'; Semple 76' | Stadium: Victoria Park; Referee: Andy Gamble |

| 22 October 2022 | Dunbar United | **1–3** | **University of Stirling** | Dunbar |
| 15:00 | Handling 4' | | McKinley 28'; Redwood 34'; Jarvis 66' | Stadium: New Countess Park; Attendance: 529; Referee: Duncan Nicolson |

| 24 October 2022 | **Pollok** | **4–3** | Annan Athletic | Glasgow |
| 19:45 | Fraser 5'; Christie 45'; Mullen 53'; McCann 62' | | McCartney 35', 66'; Williamson 80' | Stadium: Newlandsfield Park; Attendance: 900; Referee: Gavin Duncan |

== Third round ==
The third round took place on the weekend of 26 November 2022. Along with the 20 winners from the second round, there were 20 new entries at this stage - all from League One and the Championship. The draw for the third round was made on 24 October 2022 at 16:00, live on the Scottish Cup YouTube, Facebook and Twitter pages.

Teams in Italics were unknown at the time of the draw. Teams in bold advanced to the fourth round.

Dunipace were drawn against Championship club Cove Rangers (65 places above them), representing the biggest league position gap between two teams in the competition's history since the pyramid system was introduced. Drumchapel United's win over FC Edinburgh from League One (61 places above them) was also a record for the biggest league position gap for a lower ranked winning club.

| Championship | League One | League Two | Tier 5 | Other |
|---|---|---|---|---|
| **Arbroath**; **Ayr United**; **Cove Rangers**; **Dundee**; **Greenock Morton**; **Hamilton Academical**; **Inverness Caledonian Thistle**; **Partick Thistle**; **Queen's Park**; **Raith Rovers** | Airdrieonians; **Alloa Athletic**; Clyde; **Dunfermline Athletic**; Edinburgh; **Falkirk**; Kelty Hearts; Montrose; Peterhead; Queen of the South | Albion Rovers; **Dumbarton**; **Elgin City**; Forfar Athletic; **Stenhousemuir**; Stirling Albion | Highland League: Formartine United; Fraserburgh; Wick Academy; Lowland League: Broomhill; East Kilbride; **University of Stirling** | East of Scotland League Premier Division: Hill of Beath Hawthorn; **Linlithgow Rose**; Sauchie Juniors; West of Scotland League Premier Division: Auchinleck Talbot; **Darvel**; Pollok; East of Scotland League First Division: Dunipace; West of Scotland League First Division: **Drumchapel United** |

=== Matches ===
| 25 November 2022 | Broomhill | **1–2** | **Alloa Athletic** | Cumbernauld |
| 19:45 | Broadfoot 79' | | Donnelly 30'; Taggart 90' (pen.) | Stadium: Broadwood Stadium; Attendance: 1,403; Referee: Gavin Duncan |

| 26 November 2022 | **Drumchapel United** | **1–0** | Edinburgh | Glasgow |
| 13:30 | Docherty 47' | | | Stadium: Lochburn Park; Attendance: 503; Referee: Alan Newlands |

| 26 November 2022 | **Hamilton Academical** | **4–0** | East Kilbride | Hamilton |
| 14:30 | Ryan 37', 70', 75'; One 73' | | | Stadium: New Douglas Park; Attendance: 1,171; Referee: Grant Irvine |

| 26 November 2022 | Formartine United | **1–3** | **Stenhousemuir** | Pitmedden |
| 15:00 | Wade 90' | | Norris 50' (o.g.); A.Brown 84'; Yates 90' | Stadium: North Lodge Park; Attendance: 248; Referee: George Calder |

| 26 November 2022 | Montrose | **2–5** | **Darvel** | Montrose |
| 15:00 | Masson 14'; Brown 80' | | Eadie 9'; McShane 29', 57'; Caldwell 33'; Stirling 85' | Stadium: Links Park; Attendance: 616; Referee: Graham Beaton |

| 26 November 2022 | Peterhead | **0–3** | **Queen's Park** | Peterhead |
| 15:00 | | | Thomas 30', 62'; Savoury 90' | Stadium: Balmoor Stadium; Attendance: 455; Referee: Duncan Williams |

| 26 November 2022 | Hill of Beath Hawthorn | **1–2** | **Elgin City** | Hill of Beath |
| 15:00 | Connelly 8' | | Dingwall 20'; Hester 31' | Stadium: Keir's Park; Attendance: 600; Referee: Greg Soutar |

| 26 November 2022 | Wick Academy | **0–6** | **Falkirk** | Wick |
| 15:00 | | | Burrell 41'; McGuffie 61'; Oliver 63', 70' (pen.); Donaldson 84'; McKay 87' | Stadium: Harmsworth Park; Attendance: 1,048; Referee: Barry Cook |

| 26 November 2022 | **Partick Thistle** | **3–0** | Kelty Hearts | Glasgow |
| 15:00 | Graham 7'; Dowds 58'; Weston 79' | | | Stadium: Firhill Stadium; Attendance: 1,818; Referee: Craig Napier |

| 26 November 2022 | Fraserburgh | **0–2** | **Arbroath** | Fraserburgh |
| 15:00 | | | Linn 17', 89' | Stadium: Bellslea Park; Attendance: 1,060; Referee: Calum Scott |

| 26 November 2022 | **Raith Rovers** | **3–0** | Auchinleck Talbot | Kirkcaldy |
| 15:00 | Connolly 63', 73', 86' | | | Stadium: Stark's Park; Attendance: 1,697; Referee: David Dickinson |

| 26 November 2022 | Albion Rovers | **0–1** (a.e.t.) | **University of Stirling** | Coatbridge |
| 15:00 | | | McGill 111' | Stadium: Cliftonhill; Attendance: 385; Referee: Alex Shepherd |

| 26 November 2022 | **Cove Rangers** | **7–0** | Dunipace | Aberdeen |
| 15:00 | McDonagh 18', 38', 47', 49'; McIntosh 82'; Fyvie 84'; Masson 87' | | | Stadium: Balmoral Stadium; Attendance: 540; Referee: Matthew MacDermid |

| 26 November 2022 | **Dundee** | **6–2** (a.e.t.) | Airdrieonians | Dundee |
| 15:00 | McMullan 45'; Rudden 54'; Osei 103', 108'; Robertson 112'; McCowan 117' | | Gallagher 21'; Smith 66' | Stadium: Dens Park; Attendance: 2,341; Referee: Lloyd Wilson |

| 26 November 2022 | **Greenock Morton** | **4–1** | Queen of the South | Greenock |
| 15:00 | Muirhead 23', 72'; Gillespie 89' (pen.); King 90' | | L. Gibson 31' | Stadium: Cappielow; Attendance: 1,614; Referee: Scott Lambie |

| 26 November 2022 | **Linlithgow Rose** | **1–0** | Sauchie Juniors | Linlithgow |
| 15:00 | Stowe 17' (pen.) | | | Stadium: Prestonfield; Attendance: 1,403; Referee: Chris Fordyce |

| 26 November 2022 | **Inverness Caledonian Thistle** | **3–2** | Stirling Albion | Inverness |
| 15:00 | Duffy 31'; Ram 40'; Doran 69' | | Carrick 27', 45' | Stadium: Caledonian Stadium; Attendance: 738; Referee: Dan McFarlane |

| 26 November 2022 | **Dunfermline Athletic** | **4–0** | Forfar Athletic | Dunfermline |
| 15:00 | Wighton 27', 71'; Ritchie-Hosler 33'; Edwards 42' | | | Stadium: East End Park; Attendance: 1,880; Referee: Iain Snedden |

| 26 November 2022 | Clyde | **1–3** | **Dumbarton** | Hamilton |
| 19:45 | McDonald 63' | | Wilson 19'; Wallace 36'; MacLean 90' | Stadium: New Douglas Park; Attendance: 563; Referee: Stewart Luke |

| 28 November 2022 | **Ayr United** | **1–0** | Pollok | Ayr |
| 19:45 | Dempsey 51' | | | Stadium: Somerset Park; Attendance: 2,425; Referee: Don Robertson |

== Fourth round ==
The fourth round took place on the weekend of 21 January 2023. Along with the 20 winners from the third round, there are 12 new entries at this stage - all from the Premiership. The draw for the fourth round was made on 28 November 2022 following the Ayr United v Pollok match, live on BBC Scotland.

Teams in bold advanced to the fifth round. Queen's Park won 2–0 at Inverness in their fourth round match, but were expelled from the competition because they fielded an ineligible player.

| Premiership | Championship | League One | League Two | Other |
|---|---|---|---|---|
| Aberdeen; **Celtic**; **Dundee United**; **Heart of Midlothian**; Hibernian; **Kilmarnock**; **Livingston**; **Motherwell**; **Rangers**; Ross County; St Johnstone; **St Mirren** | Arbroath; **Ayr United**; Cove Rangers; Dundee; Greenock Morton; **Hamilton Academical**; **Inverness Caledonian Thistle**; **Partick Thistle**; Queen's Park; **Raith Rovers** | Alloa Athletic; Dunfermline Athletic; **Falkirk** | Dumbarton; **Elgin City**; Stenhousemuir | Lowland League: University of Stirling; East of Scotland League Premier Division: Linlithgow Rose; West of Scotland League Premier Division: **Darvel**; West of Scotland League First Division: Drumchapel United |

=== Matches ===
| 21 January 2023 | **Celtic** | **5–0** | Greenock Morton | Glasgow |
| 12:15 | Mooy 18' (pen.), 84'; Furuhashi 21', 45+1'; Turnbull 42' | | | Stadium: Celtic Park; Attendance: 40,011; Referee: Kevin Clancy |

| 21 January 2023 | **Kilmarnock** | **1–0** | Dumbarton | Kilmarnock |
| 15:00 | Jones 90+1' | | | Stadium: Rugby Park; Attendance: 3,705; Referee: Nick Walsh |

| 21 January 2023 | **Dundee United** | **3–0** | University of Stirling | Dundee |
| 15:00 | Behich 45'; McGrath 68'; Middleton 81' | | | Stadium: Tannadice Park; Attendance: 4,993; Referee: Chris Graham |

| 21 January 2023 | **St Mirren** | **0–0** (a.e.t.) (**3–0** p) | Dundee | Paisley |
| 15:00 | | | | Stadium: St Mirren Park; Attendance: 4,254; Referee: Colin Steven |
| | **Penalties** |
| | Brophy (penalty missed); O'Hara (penalty scored); Greive (penalty scored); Kiltie (penalty scored) | | (penalty missed) Rudden; (penalty missed) Thomas; (penalty missed) Cameron |

| 21 January 2023 | **Partick Thistle** | **1–1** (a.e.t.) (**4–2** p) | Dunfermline Athletic | Glasgow |
| 15:00 | Fitzpatrick 51' | | Benedictus 42' | Stadium: Firhill Stadium; Attendance: 3,218; Referee: Scott Lambie |
| | **Penalties** |
| | Muirhead (penalty scored); Holt (penalty scored); Turner (penalty scored); Dowds (penalty scored) | | (penalty missed) Benedictus; (penalty scored) MacDonald; (penalty scored) McCann; (penalty missed) Todd |

| 21 January 2023 | Arbroath | **0–2** | **Motherwell** | Arbroath |
| 15:00 | | | Mandron 26', 90+4' | Stadium: Gayfield Park; Attendance: 4,145; Referee: Willie Collum |

| 21 January 2023 | Alloa Athletic | **1–2** | **Falkirk** | Alloa |
| 15:00 | Donnelly 21' | | McKay 45'; Burrell 77' | Stadium: Recreation Park; Attendance: 1,532; Referee: Calum Scott |

| 21 January 2023 | Stenhousemuir | **1–3** | **Livingston** | Stenhousemuir |
| 15:00 | Jamieson 26' | | Pittman 52'; Bradley 55', 59' | Stadium: Ochilview Park; Attendance: 916; Referee: Euan Anderson |

| 21 January 2023 | **Hamilton Academical** | **0–0** (a.e.t.) (**5–3** p) | Ross County | Hamilton |
| 15:00 | | | | Stadium: New Douglas Park; Attendance: 783; Referee: Grant Irvine |
| | **Penalties** |
| | Zanatta (penalty scored); Winter (penalty scored); McGowan (penalty scored); Martin (penalty scored); Ryan (penalty scored) | | (penalty missed) White; (penalty scored) Loturi; (penalty scored) Cancola; (penalty scored) Akio |

| 21 January 2023 | St Johnstone | **0–1** | **Rangers** | Perth |
| 17:30 | | | Barišić 45' | Stadium: McDiarmid Park; Attendance: 7,855; Referee: Alan Muir |

| 22 January 2023 | Hibernian | **0–3** | **Heart of Midlothian** | Edinburgh |
| 14:00 | | | Ginnelly 10'; Shankland 72'; Sibbick 90' | Stadium: Easter Road; Attendance: 18,622; Referee: Don Robertson |

| 23 January 2023 | **Darvel** | **1–0** | Aberdeen | Darvel |
| 19:45 | Kirkpatrick 19' | | | Stadium: Recreation Park; Attendance: 2,200; Referee: David Munro |

| 24 January 2023 | **Elgin City** | **2–1** | Drumchapel United | Elgin |
| 19:45 | Lawrence 22'; Hester 64' | | McLaren 18' | Stadium: Borough Briggs; Attendance: 755; Referee: Chris Fordyce |

| 24 January 2023 | Linlithgow Rose | **0–2** | **Raith Rovers** | Linlithgow |
| 19:45 | | | Gullan 55', 88' | Stadium: Prestonfield; Attendance: 1,720; Referee: Graham Grainger |

| 31 January 2023 | Cove Rangers | **0–3** | **Ayr United** | Aberdeen |
| 19:45 | | | McKenzie 23'; Akinyemi 68'; Ashford 77' | Stadium: Balmoral Stadium; Attendance: 433; Referee: Steven Kirkland |

| 31 January 2023 | **Inverness Caledonian Thistle** | **0–2** **(void)** | Queen's Park | Inverness |
| 19:45 | | | Thomas 74'; Williamson 84' | Stadium: Caledonian Stadium; Attendance: 869; Referee: Chris Graham |

Notes

B- Queen's Park fielded an ineligible player in their fourth round match against Inverness Caledonian Thistle and were removed from the competition. The match had originally finished 2–0 to Queen's Park.

== Fifth round ==
The fifth round took place on the weekend of 11 February 2023. The draw was made on 22 January 2023 and broadcast live across the Scottish Cup social channels.

Teams in Italics were unknown at the time of the draw.

Teams in bold advanced to the quarter-finals.

| Premiership | Championship | Other |
|---|---|---|
| **Celtic**; Dundee United; **Heart of Midlothian**; **Kilmarnock**; Livingston; Motherwell; **Rangers**; St Mirren | **Ayr United**; Hamilton Academical; Partick Thistle; **Inverness Caledonian Thistle**; **Raith Rovers** | League One: **Falkirk**; League Two: Elgin City; West of Scotland League Premier Division: Darvel |

=== Matches ===
| 10 February 2023 | Hamilton Academical | **0–2** | **Heart of Midlothian** | Hamilton |
| 19:45 | | | Humphrys 29'; Devlin 79' | Stadium: New Douglas Park; Attendance: 4,731; Referee: Kevin Clancy |

| 11 February 2023 | **Raith Rovers** | **3–1** | Motherwell | Kirkcaldy |
| 15:00 | Gullan 17' (pen.); Stanton 39'; Gonçalves 85' | | Van Veen 51' | Stadium: Stark's Park; Attendance: 4,436; Referee: Nick Walsh |

| 11 February 2023 | Livingston | **0–3** | **Inverness Caledonian Thistle** | Livingston |
| 15:00 | | | McKay 51', 80'; Welsh 62' | Stadium: Almondvale Stadium; Attendance: 1,284; Referee: Don Robertson |

| 11 February 2023 | Dundee United | **0–1** | **Kilmarnock** | Dundee |
| 15:00 | | | Vassell 55' | Stadium: Tannadice Park; Attendance: 4,620; Referee: Alan Muir |

| 11 February 2023 | **Ayr United** | **4–1** | Elgin City | Ayr |
| 15:00 | Bryden 90'; Dempsey 94' (pen.); Akinyemi 103', 106' | | Hester 41' | Stadium: Somerset Park; Attendance: 1,819; Referee: John Beaton |

| 11 February 2023 | **Celtic** | **5–1** | St Mirren | Glasgow |
| 17:30 | Maeda 16'; Hatate 76' (pen.), 90'; Oh 80'; O'Riley 90' | | O'Hara 87' (pen.) | Stadium: Celtic Park; Attendance: 37,728; Referee: Steven McLean |

| 12 February 2023 | **Rangers** | **3–2** | Partick Thistle | Glasgow |
| 16:00 | Čolak 50'; Tillman 71'; Sands 86' | | Holt 35' (pen.); Tiffoney 74' | Stadium: Ibrox Stadium; Attendance: 44,636; Referee: David Munro |

| 13 February 2023 | Darvel | **1–5** | **Falkirk** | Darvel |
| 19:45 | P. J. Morrison 64' (o.g.) | | Oliver 22'; C. Morrison 24'; Henderson 78'; Nesbitt 81'; McGuffie 88' | Stadium: Recreation Park; Attendance: 2,750; Referee: Willie Collum |

== Quarter-finals ==
The quarter-finals took place on the weekend of 11 March 2023. The draw was made on 13 February 2023 and broadcast live across the Scottish Cup social channels.

| Premiership | Championship | League One |
|---|---|---|
| **Celtic**; Heart of Midlothian; Kilmarnock; **Rangers** | Ayr United; **Inverness Caledonian Thistle**; Raith Rovers | **Falkirk** |

Teams in Italics were unknown at the time of the draw.

Teams in bold advanced to the semi-finals.

=== Matches ===
| 10 March 2023 | **Inverness Caledonian Thistle** | **2–1** | Kilmarnock | Inverness |
| 19:45 | Mckay 24' (pen.); Welsh 50' | | Vassell 3' | Stadium: Caledonian Stadium; Attendance: 2,902; Referee: David Dickinson |

| 11 March 2023 | Heart of Midlothian | **0–3** | **Celtic** | Edinburgh |
| 12:15 | | | Mooy 2'; Furuhashi 45'; Carter-Vickers 80' | Stadium: Tynecastle Park; Attendance: 16,287; Referee: Kevin Clancy |

| 12 March 2023 | **Rangers** | **3–0** | Raith Rovers | Glasgow |
| 13:00 | Goldson 42'; Nolan 58' (o.g.); Arfield 87' | | | Stadium: Ibrox Stadium; Attendance: 41,168; Referee: John Beaton |

| 13 March 2023 | **Falkirk** | **2–1** | Ayr United | Falkirk |
| 19:45 | C.Morrison 66' (pen.); Kennedy 83' | | Akinyemi 12' | Stadium: Falkirk Stadium; Attendance: 6,375; Referee: Nick Walsh |

== Semi-finals ==
The semi-finals took place on the weekend of 29 April 2023. The draw was made on 13 March 2023, following the Falkirk v Ayr United match live on BBC Scotland.

| Premiership | Championship | League One |
|---|---|---|
| **Celtic**; Rangers | **Inverness Caledonian Thistle** | Falkirk |

Teams in bold advanced to the Final.

=== Matches ===
| 29 April 2023 | Falkirk | **0–3** | **Inverness Caledonian Thistle** | Glasgow |
| 12:15 | | | Mckay 7' (pen.), 57'; MacKay 34' | Stadium: Hampden Park; Attendance: 12,877; Referee: Nick Walsh |

| 30 April 2023 | Rangers | **0–1** | **Celtic** | Glasgow |
| 13:30 | | | Jota 42' | Stadium: Hampden Park; Attendance: 49,839; Referee: Don Robertson |

== Final ==
3 June 2023
17:30 BST

| Celtic | 3–1 | Inverness Caledonian Thistle |
|---|---|---|
| Furuhashi 38'; Abada 65'; Jota 90+1' | Report | D. MacKay 84' |

Hampden Park, Glasgow
Attendance: 47,247
Referee: John Beaton

== Broadcasting ==
The Scottish Cup is broadcast by Viaplay Sports and BBC Scotland. Viaplay Sports has the first two picks of the fourth and fifth rounds, the quarter-finals as well as first pick of one semi-final and airs the final non-exclusively. BBC Scotland broadcast one match per round from the first round onwards and two matches per round from the fourth round to the quarter-finals, as well as one semi-final and the final.

The following matches were selected for live coverage on UK television:

| Round | BBC Scotland | Viaplay Sports |
|---|---|---|
| First round | ~~Pollok v Huntly~~ | |
| Second round | Cumnock Juniors v Dumbarton; Pollok v Annan Athletic | |
| Third round | Ayr United v Pollok | |
| Fourth round | Celtic v Greenock Morton; Darvel v Aberdeen | St Johnstone v Rangers; Hibernian v Heart of Midlothian |
| Fifth round | Hamilton Academical v Heart of Midlothian; Darvel v Falkirk | Celtic v St Mirren; Rangers v Partick Thistle |
| Quarter-finals | Inverness Caledonian Thistle v Kilmarnock; Falkirk v Ayr United | Heart of Midlothian v Celtic; Rangers v Raith Rovers |
| Semi-finals | Falkirk v Inverness Caledonian Thistle | Falkirk v Inverness Caledonian Thistle; Rangers v Celtic |
| Final | Celtic v Inverness Caledonian Thistle | |
