= Matthew Strachan (footballer) =

Scottish footballer (born 2005)

Personal information
- Date of birth: 3 June 2005 (age 21)
- Place of birth: Inverness, Scotland
- Position: Defender

Team information
- Current team: Formartine United

Youth career
- 2013–2022: Inverness Caledonian Thistle

Senior career*
Years	Team	Apps	(Gls)
2022–2026	Inverness Caledonian Thistle	19	(0)
2023	→ Nairn County (loan)	8	(1)
2023–2024	→ Brora Rangers (loan)	6	(0)
2024	→ Nairn County (loan)		
2025–2026	→ Brora Rangers (loan)	1	(0)
2026	→ Forfar Athletic (loan)	7	(0)
2026–	Formartine United	0	(0)
- * Club domestic league appearances and goals as of 00:05, 1 August 2026 (UTC)

Matthew Strachan (born 3 June 2005) is a Scottish professional footballer who plays as a defender for Highland League side, Formartine United.

== Club career ==
Strachan made his professional debut in a 1–0 home loss to Hamilton Academical coming on as a substitute in injury time for Max Ram on 18 October 2022.

In February 2023, Strachan joined Highland League side, Nairn County on loan for the remainder of the 2023–24 season. In August 2023, Strachan moved to fellow Highland League side, Brora Rangers on loan, before being recalled in February 2024, and rejoining Nairn County on loan. On 31 October 2025, Strachan returned to Brora on loan until January 2026.

In February 2026, Strachan went on loan to Scottish League Two side, Forfar Athletic, for the remainder of the season.

On 25 May 2026 it was announced that Strachan was one of 9 players who would be leaving Inverness upon the expiration of his contract.

On 10 July 2026, Strachan joined Highland League side, Formartine United.
