= Scott Allardice =

Scottish footballer (born 1998)

Personal information
- Date of birth: 31 March 1998 (age 28)
- Place of birth: Dundee, Scotland
- Height: 5 ft 11 in (1.80 m)
- Position: Midfielder

Team information
- Current team: Ratchaburi
- Number: 48

Youth career
- Dundee Rovers
- Celtic Boys Club
- Dundee
- 2010–2014: Dundee United

Senior career*
Years	Team	Apps	(Gls)
2014–2019	Dundee United	9	(0)
2018	→ East Fife (loan)	11	(0)
2018–2019	→ Dumbarton (loan)	12	(0)
2019	Bohemians	18	(0)
2020	Waterford	3	(0)
2020–2023	Inverness Caledonian Thistle	70	(7)
2023–2025	Ross County	30	(0)
2025–2026	Ratchaburi	4	(1)
2026	Visakha	15	(3)
2026–	Ratchaburi	0	(0)

International career
- Scotland U19
- * Club domestic league appearances and goals as of 23:39, 5 November 2026 (UTC)

Scott Allardice (born 31 March 1998) is a Scottish footballer who plays as a defensive midfielder for Thai League 1 side Ratchaburi.

He began his career with Dundee United, making his first team debut in April 2017. He spent loan spells with East Fife and Dumbarton in 2018 before joining Bohemians in 2019. In 2020 he joined Inverness Caledonian Thistle and player there until 2023, when he joined their Highland rivals Ross County.

He has represented the Scotland national under-19 team.

== Early life ==
Scott Allardice was born in Dundee on 31 March 1998. He began his football career with Dundee Rovers and Celtic Boys Club before joining Dundee as a youth player. A pupil at St John's Roman Catholic High School, he joined the Dundee United youth programme based at the school in 2010, where he was coached by Ian Cathro.

== Club career ==
Allardice signed his first professional contract for Dundee United in June 2014, but missed most of the 2014–15 season due to a knee injury. He made his first team debut against Falkirk in a Scottish Championship match on 8 April 2017.

Allardice was loaned to East Fife in February 2018. In May 2018 he signed a new one-year contract with Dundee United before joining Scottish League One side Dumbarton on a six-month loan deal. He made 13 appearances for Dumbarton before returning to United in January 2019. He was released later that month, joining League of Ireland Premier Division club Bohemians after a successful trial. He would go on to wear the captain's armband for Bohemians in his native Scotland as the Irish outfit took part in the Scottish Challenge Cup in place of club captain Derek Pender who was rested for the trip. Allardice signed for League of Ireland team Waterford before the 2020 season commenced.

In August 2020, Allardice joined Inverness Caledonian Thistle on a one-year deal. He signed a two-year contract extension in January 2021. He would play an important part for the Caley Jags over three seasons and helped the club to an unlikely 2023 Scottish Cup final appearance.

In June 2023, Allardice would leave Inverness and join their Highland derby rivals, Scottish Premiership club Ross County. After being released by Ross County, Allardice joined Thai League 1 side Ratchaburi on 14 October 2025.

== International career ==
Allardice has represented the Scotland under-19 team.

== Career statistics ==
As of 26 April 2025

Appearances and goals by club, season and competition
Club	Season	League			National Cup		League Cup		Other		Total	
Club	Season	Division	Apps	Goals	Apps	Goals	Apps	Goals	Apps	Goals	Apps	Goals
Dundee United	2014–15	Scottish Premiership	0	0	0	0	0	0	–		0	0
Dundee United	2015–16	Scottish Premiership	0	0	0	0	0	0	–		0	0
Dundee United	2016–17	Scottish Championship	5	0	0	0	0	0	1 (Note: Appearance in the Premiership play-offs)	0	6	0
Dundee United	2017–18	Scottish Championship	4	0	0	0	4	0	4 (Note: Appearances in the Scottish Challenge Cup)	0	12	0
Dundee United	2018–19	Scottish Championship	0	0	0	0	0	0	1	0	1	0
Dundee United	Total		9	0	0	0	4	0	6	0	19	0
East Fife (loan)	2017–18	Scottish League One	11	0	0	0	0	0	0	0	11	0
Dumbarton (loan)	2018–19	Scottish League One	12	0	1	0	0	0	0	0	13	0
Bohemians	2019	League of Ireland Premier Division	18	0	1	0	4	0	1	1	24	1
Waterford	2020	League of Ireland Premier Division	3	0	0	0	–		–		3	0
Inverness Caledonian Thistle	2020–21	Scottish Championship	25	3	3	0	4	0	0	0	32	3
Inverness Caledonian Thistle	2021–22	Scottish Championship	20	0	2	0	4	0	6 (Note: three appearances in the Scottish Challenge Cup and three appearances in Premiership play-offs)	0	32	0
Inverness Caledonian Thistle	2022–23	Scottish Championship	25	4	5	0	5	0	1	0	36	4
Inverness Caledonian Thistle	Total		70	7	10	0	13	0	7	0	100	7
Ross County	2023–24	Scottish Prmiership	13	0	0	0	4	0	1 (Note: Appearances in Scottish Premiership play-offs)	0	18	0
Ross County	2024–25	Scottish Prmiership	17	0	1	0	3	0	–		21	0
Ross County	Total		30	0	1	0	7	0	1	0	39	0
Career total			153	7	13	0	28	0	14	1	209	8

== Honours ==
Inverness CT

- Scottish Cup: Runner-up: 2022–23
