= Nathan Shaw =

English footballer

Personal information
- Full name: Nathan Edward Shaw
- Date of birth: 22 November 2000 (age 25)
- Place of birth: England
- Position: Left midfielder

Team information
- Current team: Glentoran

Youth career
- –2019: Blackpool

Senior career*
Years	Team	Apps	(Gls)
2019–2021	Blackpool	1	(0)
2020	→ Bamber Bridge (loan)	2	(1)
2020–2021	→ AFC Fylde (loan)	14	(2)
2021	→ Stockport County (loan)	2	(0)
2021–2022	AFC Fylde	19	(1)
2022–2024	Inverness Caledonian Thistle	59	(13)
2024–2026	Greenock Morton	54	(5)
2026-	Glentoran	0	(0)
- * Club domestic league appearances and goals as of 5 November 2026

Nathan Edward Shaw (born 22 November 2000) is an English professional footballer who plays as a midfielder for Northern Irish side Glentoran.

== Career ==
In 2018, Shaw was part of the Blackpool squad that reached the FA Youth Cup semi-finals. In June 2019, Shaw signed a professional contract with the club. On 3 September 2019, Shaw made his debut for Blackpool in a 5–1 EFL Trophy win against Morecambe.

On 19 February 2020, Shaw joined Bamber Bridge on loan for a month. Shaw scored on his debut for the club, grabbing the third in a 3–0 victory over F.C. United of Manchester. He would go on to appear in one more match before the season was ended due to the COVID-19 pandemic.

He went out on another loan, this time to AFC Fylde, in October 2020. Initially until January, the loan was extended until the end of the 2020–21 season. He returned from the loan on 27 January, after the National League North was placed in suspension due to the COVID-19 pandemic.

On 8 March 2021, Shaw joined National League side Stockport County on loan for one month.

He joined Inverness Caledonian Thistle, of the Scottish Championship, on 19 June 2022.

On 24 June 2024, he signed for Scottish Championship club Greenock Morton on a one-year deal.

On 05 November 2026, Nathan signed for Northern Irish football club Glentoran on a one-year deal.

== Career statistics ==
As of match played 30 July 2022

Appearances and goals by club, season and competition
Club	Season	League			National Cup		League Cup		Other		Total	
Club	Season	Division	Apps	Goals	Apps	Goals	Apps	Goals	Apps	Goals	Apps	Goals
Blackpool	2019–20	League One	0	0	0	0	0	0	2 (Note: Appearance(s) in EFL Trophy)	0	2	0
Blackpool	2020–21	League One	1	0	0	0	0	0	1	0	2	0
Blackpool	Total		1	0	0	0	0	0	3	0	4	0
Bamber Bridge (loan)	2019–20	Northern Premier Division	2	1	—		—		0	0	2	1
AFC Fylde (loan)	2020–21	National League North	13	2	4	0	—		2 (Note: Appearance(s) in FA Trophy)	0	19	2
Stockport County (loan)	2020–21	National League	0	0	0	0	—		0	0	0	0
Inverness Caledonian Thistle	2022–23	Scottish Championship	1	0			4	0			5	0
Career total			17	3	4	0	4	0	5	0	29	3
