= Harry Nicolson =

Scottish footballer

Personal information
- Date of birth: 16 January 2001 (age 25)
- Place of birth: Inverness, Scotland
- Height: 1.86 m (6 ft 1 in)

Team information
- Current team: Clachnacuddin
- Number: 4

Youth career
- 2008–2018: Inverness Caledonian Thistle

Senior career*
Years	Team	Apps	(Gls)
2019–2022	Inverness Caledonian Thistle	0	(0)
2019–2020	→ Fort William (loan)		
2021	→ Elgin City (loan)	2	(0)
2021–2022	→ Clachnacuddin (loan)		
2022–2023	Finn Harps	7	(0)
2023–	Clachnacuddin		
- * Club domestic league appearances and goals as of 09:35, 18 January 2023 (UTC)

Harry Nicolson (born 16 January 2001) is a Scottish professional footballer who plays as a defender for Clachnacuddin in the Highland League.

== Club career ==
Nicolson joined the Inverness Caledonian Thistle youth ranks at age 7, before being promoted to the Senior Team in 2019. However, his entire time at Inverness was spent out on loan to Fort William and Clachnacuddin in the Highland League, and Elgin City in League Two, before eventually being released by the club at the end of the 2021–22 campaign.

On 6 July 2022, Harry Nicolson joined Irish Premier Division side, Finn Harps. Nicolson made his debut 11 days later in a 2–1 home loss to Derry City.

In January 2023, Nicolson returned to Clachnacuddin after leaving Finn Harps.

== Career statistics ==
As of 6 August 2022

Club	Season	League			National Cup		League Cup		Other		Total	
Club	Season	Division	Apps	Goals	Apps	Goals	Apps	Goals	Apps	Goals	Apps	Goals
Inverness Caledonian Thistle	2019–20	Scottish Championship	0	0	0	0	0	0	0	0	0	0
Inverness Caledonian Thistle	2020–21	Scottish Championship	0	0	1	0	1	0	0	0	2	0
Inverness Caledonian Thistle	2021–22	Scottish Championship	0	0	0	0	0	0	0	0	0	0
Fort William (loan)	2019–20	Highland League	0	0	2	0	0	0	0	0	2	0
Elgin City (loan)	2021–22	Scottish League Two	2	0	0	0	1	0	1	0	4	0
Clachnacuddin (loan)	2021–22	Highland League	0	0	0	0	0	0	0	0	0	0
Finn Harps	2022	League of Ireland Premier Division	2	0	0	0	0	0	0	0	2	0
Career Total			4	0	3	0	2	0	1	0	10	0
