= Roddy MacGregor =

Scottish footballer (born 2001)

Personal information
- Date of birth: 21 December 2001 (age 24)
- Position: Midfielder

Team information
- Current team: Inverness Caledonian Thistle
- Number: 26

Youth career
- Inverness Caledonian Thistle

Senior career*
Years	Team	Apps	(Gls)
2018–2024	Inverness Caledonian Thistle	77	(3)
2024–2026	Queen's Park	50	(1)
2026–	Inverness Caledonian Thistle	3	(0)

International career^{‡}
2021–	Scotland U21	1	(0)
- * Club domestic league appearances and goals as of 20:22, 13 September 2026 (UTC) ‡ National team caps and goals as of 19:25, 11 March 2023 (UTC)

Roddy MacGregor (born 21 December 2001) is a Scottish professional footballer who plays as a midfielder for Inverness Caledonian Thistle

== Club career ==
=== Inverness Caledonian Thistle ===
MacGregor began his career with Inverness Caledonian Thistle, and was one of 10 youth players to turn professional with the club in May 2018. He made his senior debut on 17 November 2018, in a 3–3 league draw away at Queen of the South.

He made a "breakthrough" with the Inverness first team in the 2019–20 season, making 20 appearances in all competitions.

He scored his first goal for Inverness on 10 November 2020, in the Scottish League Cup, in a 3–3 draw with Raith Rovers. He scored his first league goal on 4 December 2020, in a 3–0 victory against Queen of the South.

=== Queen's Park ===
Roddy joined Scottish Championship Queen's Park on 2 July 2024, signing a two-year deal.

=== Return to Inverness Caledonian Thistle ===
MacGregor announced his return to Inverness Caledonian Thistle on 29 July 2026.

== International career ==
On 25 May 2021, he received his first international call up, for the Scotland under-21 team for two friendlies against Northern Ireland alongside Inverness team-mates, Robbie Deas, Cameron Harper and Daniel MacKay. MacGregor made his under-21 debut in the second game, coming on as a substitute for Josh McPake in the 72nd minute.

== Career statistics ==
As of match played 12 September 2026

Appearances and goals by club, season and competition
Club	Season	League			Scottish Cup		Scottish League Cup		Other		Total	
Club	Season	Division	Apps	Goals	Apps	Goals	Apps	Goals	Apps	Goals	Apps	Goals
Inverness Caledonian Thistle	2018–19	Championship	5	0	2	0	0	0	0	0	7	0
Inverness Caledonian Thistle	2019–20	Championship	14	0	1	0	3	0	2 (Note: Appearance(s) in Scottish Challenge Cup)	0	20	0
Inverness Caledonian Thistle	2020–21	Championship	24	1	2	0	4	1	—		30	2
Inverness Caledonian Thistle	2021–22	Championship	21	2	2	0	4	1	2	0	29	3
Inverness Caledonian Thistle	2022–23	Championship	9	0	2	0	5	1	0	0	16	1
Inverness Caledonian Thistle	2023–24	Championship	4	0	2	0	2	0	3 (Note: Appearance(s) in Scottish Championship play-offs)	0	11	0
Inverness Caledonian Thistle	Total		77	3	11	0	18	3	7	0	113	6
Queen's Park	2024–25	Championship	24	1	2	1	5	5	3	0	34	7
Queen's Park	2025–26	Championship	15	0	2	0	4	0	2	0	23	0
Queen's Park	Total		39	1	4	1	9	5	5	0	57	7
Inverness Caledonian Thistle	2026–27	Championship	0	0	0	0	0	0	0	0	0	0
Career total			116	4	15	1	27	8	12	0	170	13

== Honours ==
Queen's Park

- Scottish Challenge Cup runner-up: 2024–25
