= Robbie Deas =

Scottish footballer (born 2000)

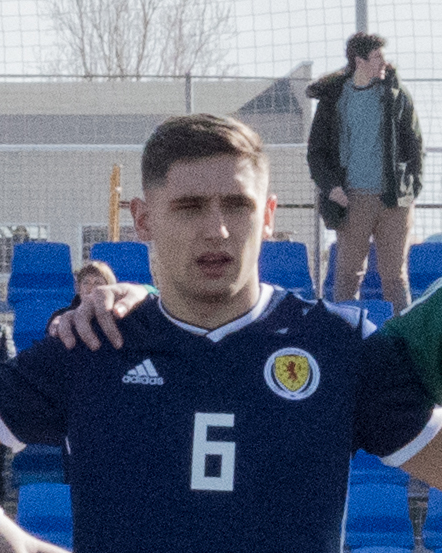
- Deas with Scotland U19, 2019

Personal information
- Date of birth: 27 February 2000 (age 26)
- Place of birth: Kinross, Scotland
- Height: 6 ft 2 in (1.88 m)
- Position: Defender

Team information
- Current team: Kilmarnock
- Number: 6

Youth career
- Blue Brazil Boys Club
- 2011–2018: Celtic

Senior career*
Years	Team	Apps	(Gls)
2018–2020	Celtic	0	(0)
2018–2019	→ Cowdenbeath (loan)	27	(0)
2019–2020	→ Alloa Athletic (loan)	24	(1)
2020–2023	Inverness Caledonian Thistle	84	(2)
2023–	Kilmarnock	98	(4)

International career^{‡}
2016–2017	Scotland U17	9	(0)
2017–	Scotland U19	15	(1)
2021	Scotland U21	1	(0)
- * Club domestic league appearances and goals as of 20 May 2026 ‡ National team caps and goals as of 2 June 2021

Robbie Deas (born 27 February 2000) is a Scottish professional footballer who plays as a defender for Scottish Premiership club Kilmarnock.

== Club career ==
=== Celtic ===
Deas signed his first professional contract with Celtic in 2018. He scored the winning goal in stoppage time as Celtic youths beat Rangers 3–2 to lift the Glasgow Cup in May 2019.

==== Loan moves to Cowdenbeath and Alloa Athletic ====
On 23 August 2018, Deas joined Scottish League Two club Cowdenbeath on loan for the 2018–19 season. On 9 October 2018, he was named in the SPFL team of the week after a narrow 1–0 victory over Stirling Albion at Central Park.

On 2 August 2019, Deas moved on loan to Scottish Championship club Alloa Athletic for the 2019–20 season.

=== Inverness CT ===
Deas left Celtic after the 2019–20 season and signed a three-year contract with Inverness Caledonian Thistle. He played for Inverness in the 2023 Scottish Cup final, which they lost 3–1 to Celtic.

=== Kilmarnock ===
Despite interest from Livingston earlier in the year, it was announced that Deas had signed a two-year contract with Scottish Premiership club Kilmarnock on 5 June 2023.

== International career ==
Deas has represented Scotland at the under-17, under-19 and under-21 levels.

Deas received his first call-up to the Scottish under-21 squad on 25 May 2021, alongside Inverness teammates Roddy MacGregor, Daniel MacKay and Cameron Harper, ahead of two friendlies against Northern Ireland.

== Personal life ==
Deas is the nephew of former footballer Paul Deas.

== Career statistics ==
As of 22 January 2022

Appearances and goals by club, season and competition
Club	Season	League			National Cup		League Cup		Other		Total	
Club	Season	Division	Apps	Goals	Apps	Goals	Apps	Goals	Apps	Goals	Apps	Goals
Celtic	2018–19	Scottish Premiership	0	0	0	0	0	0	0	0	0	0
Celtic	2019–20	Scottish Premiership	0	0	0	0	0	0	0	0	0	0
Celtic	Total		0	0	0	0	0	0	0	0	0	0
Cowdenbeath (loan)	2018–19	Scottish League Two	27	0	3	1	0	0	0	0	30	1
Alloa Athletic (loan)	2019–20	Scottish Championship	24	1	2	0	0	0	2	0	28	1
Inverness Caledonian Thistle	2020–21	Scottish Championship	26	1	3	0	4	0	0	0	33	1
Inverness Caledonian Thistle	2021–22	Scottish Championship	22	0	2	0	3	0	3	0	30	0
Inverness Caledonian Thistle	Total		48	1	5	0	7	0	3	0	63	1
Career total			99	2	10	1	7	0	5	0	121	3
