= Ryan Fyffe =

Scottish footballer

Personal information
- Date of birth: 21 May 2001 (age 25)
- Place of birth: Inverness, Scotland
- Height: 6 ft 1 in (1.85 m)
- Position: Defender

Team information
- Current team: Buckie Thistle
- Number: 16

Youth career
- –2019: Inverness Caledonian Thistle

Senior career*
Years	Team	Apps	(Gls)
2019–2020	Inverness Caledonian Thistle	0	(0)
2019–2020	→ Fort William (loan)		
2020–2022	Inverness Caledonian Thistle	1	(0)
2020–2021	→ Clachnacuddin (loan)	1	(0)
2021–2022	→ Nairn County (loan)	29	(0)
2022–	Buckie Thistle	23	(1)
- * Club domestic league appearances and goals as of 21:38, 7 July 2025 (UTC)

Ryan Fyffe (born 21 May 2001) is a Scottish footballer who plays as a defender for Highland League club Buckie Thistle.

== Early life ==
Fyffe was born in Inverness.

== Career ==
Having come through the youth academy at Inverness Caledonian Thistle, Fyffe was one of nine Inverness players to join Fort William on loan for the 2019–20 season. He won Fort William's 'player of the season' award for the 2019–20 season, but was released by Inverness at the end of the season.

He returned to Inverness Caledonian Thistle in September 2020, however, and signed a new contract with the club. He made his debut for the club on 24 October 2020 in a 1–1 draw with Ayr United, with Fyffe providing the assist for Thistle's goal. In December 2020, Fyffe went out on a month long loan to fellow Invernesian side Clachnacuddin. In August 2021, Fyffe again went out on loan, this time to Nairn County, also in the Highland League.

== Career statistics ==
As of match played 31 October 2020.

Appearances and goals by club, season and competition
Club	Season	League			Cup		League Cup		Other		Total	
Club	Season	Division	Apps	Goals	Apps	Goals	Apps	Goals	Apps	Goals	Apps	Goals
Inverness Caledonian Thistle	2018–19	Scottish Championship	0	0	0	0	0	0	0	0	0	0
Fort William (loan) (Note: Fort William statistics other than Scottish Cup unavailable)	2019–20	Highland League			3	0					3	0
Inverness Caledonian Thistle	2020–21	Scottish Championship	1	0	0	0	0	0	0	0	1	0
Clachnacuddin (loan)	2020–21	Highland League										
Nairn County (loan)	2021–22	Highland League										
Buckie Thistle	2022–23	Highland League										
Career total			1	0	3	0	0	0	0	0	4	0

== Honours ==
Individual

- Fort William Player of the Season: 2019–20
