= Cameron Harper (footballer) =

Scottish footballer (born 2001)

Personal information
- Full name: Cameron James Harper
- Date of birth: 10 November 2001 (age 24)
- Place of birth: Inverness, Scotland
- Height: 1.84 m (6 ft 0 in)
- Position: Left-back

Team information
- Current team: Carlisle United
- Number: 3

Youth career
- –2017: Inverness Caledonian Thistle

Senior career*
Years	Team	Apps	(Gls)
2017–2024	Inverness Caledonian Thistle	116	(9)
2020	→ Elgin City (loan)	4	(0)
2024–	Carlisle United	69	(2)

International career^{‡}
2021	Scotland U21	1	(0)
- * Club domestic league appearances and goals as of 13:36, 7 June 2026 (UTC) ‡ National team caps and goals as of 2 June 2021

Cameron James Harper (born 10 November 2001) is a Scottish footballer who plays for National League club Carlisle United as a defender.

== Career ==
Harper impressed Inverness manager John Robertson during a friendly game with Nairn County in August 2017. He made his league debut for Inverness on 13 March 2018 against Dunfermline Athletic as a late replacement for Riccardo Calder, but was himself injured in the 7th minute of play.

He was one of 10 youth players to turn professional with the club in May 2018.

He Joined Elgin City FC on loan in 2020

Harper was recalled from his loan following Jamie McCart's departure to St Johnstone, which left the club with few defenders.

On 14 June 2024, Harper signed for EFL League Two side, Carlisle United for an undisclosed fee.

== International career ==
On 25 May 2021, Harper received his first international call up for the Scotland U-21 squad alongside Inverness teammates Robbie Deas, Daniel MacKay and Roddy MacGregor.

== Career statistics ==
As of match played 1 October 2025

Appearances and goals by club, season and competition
Club	Season	League			National Cup (Note: Includes FA Cup, Scottish Cup)		League Cup (Note: Includes EFL Cup, Scottish League Cup)		Other		Total	
Club	Season	Division	Apps	Goals	Apps	Goals	Apps	Goals	Apps	Goals	Apps	Goals
Inverness Caledonian Thistle	2017–18	Scottish Championship	1	0	0	0	0	0	0	0	1	0
Inverness Caledonian Thistle	2018–19	Scottish Championship	0	0	1	0	0	0	2 (Note: Appearance(s) in Premiership play-offs)	0	3	0
Inverness Caledonian Thistle	2019–20	Scottish Championship	2	0	1	0	0	0	2 (Note: Appearance(s) in Scottish Challenge Cup)	0	5	0
Inverness Caledonian Thistle	2020–21	Scottish Championship	23	0	2	0	4	0	0	0	29	0
Inverness Caledonian Thistle	2021–22	Scottish Championship	24	1	0	0	4	0	9 (Note: Three appearances, one goal in Scottish Challenge Cup, Six appearances in Premiership play-offs)	1	37	2
Inverness Caledonian Thistle	2022–23	Scottish Championship	31	5	6	0	5	2	1	0	43	7
Inverness Caledonian Thistle	2023–24	Scottish Championship	36	3	1	0	4	0	5 (Note: One appearance in Scottish Challenge Cup, Four appearances in Championship play-offs)	0	46	3
Inverness Caledonian Thistle	Total		117	9	11	0	17	2	19	1	164	12
Elgin City (loan)	2019–20	Scottish League Two	4	0	0	0	0	0	0	0	4	0
Carlisle United	2024–25	League Two	36	0	1	0	0	0	2 (Note: Appearance(s) in EFL Trophy)	0	39	0
Carlisle United	2025–26	National League	33	2	2	0	0	0	2	0	37	2
Career total			190	11	14	0	17	2	23	1	244	14

== Honours ==
Inverness Caldedonian Thistle

- Scottish Cup runner-up: 2022–23
