= Daniel MacKay =

Scottish footballer (born 2001)

Personal information
- Date of birth: 19 April 2001 (age 25)
- Place of birth: Inverness, Scotland
- Position: Left winger

Youth career
- Inverness Caledonian Thistle

Senior career*
| Years | Team | Apps | (Gls) |
| 2017–2021 | Inverness Caledonian Thistle | 43 | (8) |
| 2019–2020 | → Elgin City (loan) | 24 | (2) |
| 2021–2024 | Hibernian | 2 | (0) |
| 2022 | → Kilmarnock (loan) | 10 | (0) |
| 2022–2023 | → Inverness Caledonian Thistle (loan) | 29 | (2) |
| 2023–2024 | → Livingston (loan) | 24 | (1) |
| 2024–2026 | Partick Thistle | 0 | (0) |
| 2026– | Inverness Caledonian Thistle | 6 | (0) |

International career^{‡}
| 2017–2018 | Scotland Schoolboys | | |
| 2019 | Scotland U19 | 2 | (0) |
| 2021 | Scotland U21 | 3 | (0) |
- * Club domestic league appearances and goals as of 21:21, 20 November 2026 (UTC) ‡ National team caps and goals as of 04:18, 3 June 2021 (UTC)

Daniel MacKay (born 19 April 2001) is a Scottish footballer who plays as a left winger for Scottish Championship club Inverness Caledonian Thistle.

He has previously played for Elgin City, Hibernian, Kilmarnock and Livingston. MacKay has also represented Scotland at youth levels up to and including the under-21 team.

He is the older brother to Calum MacKay, who most recently played for Inverness Caledonian Thistle.

== Career ==
=== Inverness Caledonian Thistle ===
He made his first team debut in a friendly vs Nairn County, scoring from 20 yards past the keeper. MacKay made his professional first team debut and scored his first professional goal against Peterhead on 7 October 2017 in the Scottish Challenge Cup. He scored his first league goal in a 3–1 away loss to Falkirk. He was assisted by fellow league debutant, Jack Brown. MacKay is the youngest player and goalscorer in the club's history, at just 16 years and 174 days.

He was one of 10 youth players to turn professional with the club in May 2018.

On 9 August 2019, MacKay and goalkeeper Daniel Hoban were loaned by Inverness to League Two club Elgin City. However a little over a week later, MacKay injured his ankle in a 1–0 home loss to Stenhousemuir in the 43rd minute. MacKay's loan was extended to the end of the season in the January Transfer Window.

In his first full playing season with Inverness, MacKay scored seven goals and won the club's goal of the season award for his effort against Ross County in a Scottish Cup tie.

On 7 August 2026, MacKay returned to Inverness Caledonian Thistle on a short term deal.

=== Hibernian ===
MacKay signed for Hibernian for an undisclosed amount in May 2021. On 29 July 2021, MacKay scored his first goal for Hibernian in a competitive game against FC Santa Coloma in a 2–1 win in the UEFA Conference League qualifiers second-leg.

On 13 January 2022, MacKay joined Scottish Championship side Kilmarnock on loan for the remainder of the 2021–22 season.

In July 2022, MacKay was loaned back to Inverness Caledonian Thistle for the 2022–23 season. He scored for Inverness in the 2023 Scottish Cup final, which they lost 3–1 to Celtic.

MacKay moved on loan to Livingston in August 2023.

=== Partick Thistle ===
In June 2024, he joined Partick Thistle on a two-year deal following his departure from Easter Road.

Following an injury in training in August 2024, it was confirmed that MacKay would be out injured for a significant period of the 2024–25 season.

== International career ==
In 2017, MacKay played for the Scotland Schoolboys team, along with fellow Inverness Caledonian Thistle team-mate, Kieran Chalmers. He scored in a match against England a day before he featured in the 2018 Scottish Challenge Cup Final, where he provided the assist to the winning goal from Carl Tremarco.

MacKay was called up into the Scotland under-19 squad on 28 January 2019 ahead of friendlies vs Spain and Azerbaijan. He made his under-19 debut against Spain, substituting in the 72nd minute for Stephen Kelly.

On 25 May 2021, MacKay was called into the Scotland under-21 squad for two friendlies against Northern Ireland. Three other Inverness players (Robbie Deas, Roddy MacGregor and Cameron Harper) were also selected. MacKay featured prominently in the second game, missing three good chances but winning a penalty kick that led to the match-winning goal.

== Career statistics ==
As of 14 March 2023

Appearances and goals by club, season and competition
| Club | Season | League | | | National Cup | | League Cup | | Other | | Total | |
| Club | Season | Division | Apps | Goals | Apps | Goals | Apps | Goals | Apps | Goals | Apps | Goals |
|---|---|---|---|---|---|---|---|---|---|---|---|---|
| Inverness Caledonian Thistle | 2017–18 | Scottish Championship | 7 | 1 | 1 | 0 | 0 | 0 | 2 (Note: Appearances in the Scottish Challenge Cup) | 1 | 10 | 2 |
| Inverness Caledonian Thistle | 2018–19 | Scottish Championship | 12 | 0 | 2 | 0 | 2 | 1 | 1 | 0 | 17 | 1 |
| Inverness Caledonian Thistle | 2019–20 | Scottish Championship | 0 | 0 | 0 | 0 | 0 | 0 | 0 | 0 | 0 | 0 |
| Inverness Caledonian Thistle | 2020–21 | Scottish Championship | 24 | 7 | 3 | 2 | 3 | 0 | 0 | 0 | 30 | 9 |
| Inverness Caledonian Thistle | 2020–21 | 0 | 0 | 0 | 0 | 0 | 0 | 0 | 0 | 0 | 0 | |
| Total | | 43 | 8 | 6 | 2 | 5 | 1 | 3 | 1 | 57 | 12 | |
| Elgin City (loan) | 2019–20 | Scottish League Two | 24 | 2 | 0 | 0 | 0 | 0 | 3 | 1 | 27 | 3 |
| Hibernian | 2021–22 | Scottish Premiership | 2 | 0 | 0 | 0 | 1 | 0 | 3 (Note: Appearances in the UEFA Conference League) | 1 | 6 | 1 |
| Hibernian | 2022–23 | Scottish Premiership | 0 | 0 | 0 | 0 | 0 | 0 | 0 | 0 | 0 | 0 |
| Hibernian | 2023–24 | Scottish Premiership | 0 | 0 | 0 | 0 | 0 | 0 | 1 | 0 | 1 | 0 |
| Hibernian | Total | | 2 | 0 | 0 | 0 | 1 | 0 | 4 | 1 | 7 | 1 |
| Kilmarnock (loan) | 2021–22 | Scottish Championship | 10 | 0 | 2 | 0 | 0 | 0 | 0 | 0 | 12 | 0 |
| Inverness Caledonian Thistle (loan) | 2022–23 | Scottish Championship | 21 | 1 | 3 | 0 | 5 | 1 | 1 | 0 | 30 | 2 |
| Career Total | | | 100 | 11 | 11 | 2 | 11 | 2 | 11 | 3 | 133 | 18 |
