= David Carson (footballer) =

English footballer

Personal information
- Date of birth: 20 September 1995 (age 31)
- Place of birth: Newcastle-upon-Tyne, England
- Height: 1.78 m (5 ft 10 in)
- Position: Midfielder

Team information
- Current team: South Shields

Youth career
- Newcastle United
- Sunderland

Senior career*
Years	Team	Apps	(Gls)
2013–2014	Ashington		
2014–2016	Blackburn Rovers	0	(0)
2016–2017	South Shields		
2017	Whitby Town		
2017–2019	Morpeth Town		
2019–2024	Inverness Caledonian Thistle	124	(2)
2024	Livingston	11	(0)
2024–	South Shields	28	(0)
- * Club domestic league appearances and goals as of 3 September 2025

David Carson (born 20 September 1995) is an English footballer who plays as a midfielder for National League North club South Shields.

== Career ==
Born in Newcastle-upon-Tyne, Carson spent his early career with Ashington. In 2014, Carson signed for Blackburn Rovers He returned to non-league, playing with South Shields, Whitby Town and Morpeth Town.

On 15 May 2019, Carson signed for Scottish Championship side Inverness Caledonian Thistle. He said he was hoping to be successful at the club, and new Inverness manager John Robertson tipped him for success.

On 1 February 2024, Carson signed for Scottish Premiership club Livingston on an eighteen-month contract.

After making only one league appearance in the 2024-25 season, Carson terminated his contract with the club in December 2024.

On 6 December 2024, Carson returned to England, returning to now National League North club South Shields on a three-and-a-half year deal.

== Honours ==
Individual

- Scottish Championship Player of the Month: March 2021
