= Max Ram =

English footballer

Personal information
- Full name: Max Benjamin Ram
- Date of birth: 27 November 2000 (age 25)
- Position: Central defender

Team information
- Current team: Rushall Olympic

Youth career
- Leicester City
- 2017–2020: Nottingham Forest

Senior career*
Years	Team	Apps	(Gls)
2020–2021	Stratford Town		
2021–2022	Wycombe Wanderers	0	(0)
2021–2022	→ Hungerford Town (loan)	19	(2)
2022–2023	Inverness Caledonian Thistle	10	(0)
2023–2024	Gloucester City	24	(0)
2024	Alfreton Town	2	(0)
2024	Rushall Olympic	0	(0)
2024	Redditch United	17	(1)
2025	Hungerford Town	6	(0)
2025	Leamington	7	(1)
2025	Redditch United	3	(0)
2026–	Rushall Olympic	0	(0)
- * Club domestic league appearances and goals as of 09:05, 21 February (UTC)

Max Benjamin Ram (born 27 November 2000) is an English professional footballer who plays as a central defender for Southern League Premier Division Central club Rushall Olympic.

== Career ==
Ram began his career with Leicester City and Nottingham Forest, later playing in non-League with Stratford Town after being released. He signed a one-year contract with Wycombe Wanderers in August 2021. On 19 November 2021, Ram joined National League South side Hungerford Town on a 28-day loan deal.

On 28 June 2022, Ram joined Inverness Caledonian Thistle in the Scottish Championship. He joined Gloucester City on 24 August 2023. In March 2024, he joined Alfreton Town following his departure from Gloucester.

On 1 July 2024, Ram joined fellow National League North side Rushall Olympic. Just one month later however, on the eve of the new season, he joined Redditch United. He returned to Hungerford Town in March 2025.

On 7 July 2025, Ram joined National League North club Leamington. He departed the club in September 2025. He returned to Rushall Olympic in February 2026.
