= Wallace Duffy =

Scottish footballer

Personal information
- Date of birth: 12 April 1999 (age 27)
- Place of birth: Dunfermline, Scotland
- Height: 1.73 m (5 ft 8 in)
- Positions: Right-back; centre-back

Youth career
- Rangers
- Celtic

Senior career*
Years	Team	Apps	(Gls)
2019–2020	St Johnstone	11	(0)
2020	→ Greenock Morton (loan)	0	(0)
2020–2024	Inverness Caledonian Thistle	83	(3)
2024	Strathspey Thistle		
2024–2025	Brora Rangers		

International career^{‡}
2015–2016	Scotland U17	3	(1)
2017–2018	Scotland U19	7	(1)
- * Club domestic league appearances and goals as of 18:09, 24 October 2024 (UTC) ‡ National team caps and goals as of 09:23, 21 June 2019 (UTC)

Wallace Duffy (born 12 April 1999) is a Scottish former professional footballer who played as a right-back and centre-back.

== Club career ==
Duffy began his career with Rangers, before playing for Celtic, making one appearance for their under-20s team in the Scottish Challenge Cup. He signed for St Johnstone in June 2019, and stated his intention to break into the first-team.

In September 2020, St Johnstone agreed to loan Duffy to Greenock Morton for the 2020–21 season, but days later this deal was cancelled due to "non-footballing reasons". He was released by St Johnstone in October 2020. Later that month he signed for Inverness Caledonian Thistle. Duffy confirmed his departure from Inverness following the conclusion of the 2023–24 season after not receiving a new contract offer from the club. On 10 August 2024, Duffy re-signed for Inverness Caledonian Thistle on a two-year deal. On 24 October 2024, Duffy was released by Inverness after they entered administration.

On 3 November 2024, Wallace signed a three-year contract with Highland League side Strathspey Thistle. On 22 December 2024, Duffy agreed to sign with Highland League side Brora Rangers on a two-and-a-half year deal. On 9 July 2025, Duffy and teammate Matthew Wright made the decision to take an indefinite break from football for personal reasons.

== International career ==
Duffy has represented Scotland at under-17 and under-19 youth levels.
