= 2009–10 North of Scotland Cup =

2009–10 Nutel North of Scotland Cup
Tournament details
- Country: Scotland
- Teams: 14

Final positions
- Champions: Inverness CT
- Runner-up: Nairn County

Tournament statistics
- Matches played: 12
- Goals scored: 47 (3.92 per match)

The 2009–10 North of Scotland Cup was won by Inverness Caledonian Thistle.

== 2009–10 Competing Clubs ==
- Bonar Bridge
- Brora Rangers
- Clachnacuddin
- Elgin City
- Forres Mechanics
- Fort William
- Golspie Sutherland
- Halkirk Utd
- Inverness Caledonian Thistle
- Lossiemouth
- Nairn County
- Rothes
- Strathspey Thistle
- Wick Academy

== First round ==
24 July 2009	Halkirk Utd	0 − 4	Wick Academy	Harmsworth Park, Wick
20:00 BST

25 July 2009	Bonar Bridge	0 − 2	Brora Rangers	Migdale Park, Bonar Bridge
15:00 BST		Report	Evan Murray 30'; John Cameron 65' (pen.)

25 July 2009	Fort William	w/o	Elgin City
15:00 BST

25 July 2009	Lossiemouth	4 − 3	Strathspey Thistle	Grant Park, Lossiemouth
15:00 BST

25 July 2009	Nairn County	3 − 0	Forres Mechanics	Station Park, Nairn
15:00 BST

29 July 2009	Golspie Sutherland	0 − 5	Inverness Caledonian Thistle	King George V Park, Golspie
19:30 BST

== Second round ==
11 August 2009	Clachnacuddin	0 − 2	Inverness Caledonian Thistle	Grant Street Park, Inverness
19:30 BST

11 August 2009	Fort William	3 − 4	Rothes	Claggan Park, Fort William
19:30 BST

11 August 2009	Lossiemouth	0 − 2	Nairn County	Grant Park, Lossiemouth
19:30 BST

11 August 2009	Wick Academy	3 − 0	Brora Rangers	Harmsworth Park, Wick
19:30 BST

== Semi finals ==
25 August 2009	Nairn County	2 − 1	Rothes	Station Park, Nairn
20:00 BST

26 August 2009	Wick Academy	1 − 3	Inverness Caledonian Thistle	Harmsworth Park, Wick
19:30 BST

== Final ==
13 September 2009
15:00 BST

Inverness Caledonian Thistle	3 − 2	Nairn County
Gavin Morrison 3'; Shane Sutherland 29'; Adam Rooney 68'	Report	Gregg Main 43'; Willie Baron 79'

Mosset Park, Forres
Referee: Alan Frew
