= 1998–99 North of Scotland Cup =

1998-99 McEwan's North of Scotland Cup
Tournament details
- Country: Scotland
- Teams: 12

Final positions
- Champions: Elgin City
- Runner-up: Rothes

Tournament statistics
- Matches played: 11
- Goals scored: 29 (2.64 per match)

The 1998–99 North of Scotland Cup was won by Elgin City

== 1998–99 Competing Clubs ==
- Brora Rangers
- Clachnacuddin
- Elgin City
- Forres Mechanics
- Fort William
- Golspie Sutherland
- Inverness Caledonian Thistle 'A'
- Lossiemouth
- Nairn County
- Ross County 'A'
- Rothes
- Wick Academy

== First round ==
| Home team | Score | Away team |
|---|---|---|
| Fort William | 0-1 | Ross County 'A' |
| Rothes | 1-0 | Clachnacuddin |
| Nairn County | 1-0 | Inverness Caledonian Thistle 'A' |
| Wick Academy | 1-2 | Lossiemouth |

== Second round ==
| Home team | Score | Away team |
|---|---|---|
| Elgin City | 4-0 | Golspie Sutherland |
| Ross County 'A' | 2-1 | Forres Mechanics |
| Nairn County | 0-4 | Brora Rangers |
| Rothes | 3-0 | Lossiemouth |

== Semi finals ==
| Home team | Score | Away team |
|---|---|---|
| Brora Rangers | 0-3 | Elgin City |
| Rothes | 3-1 | Ross County 'A' |

== Final ==
| Elgin City | 2 − 0 | Rothes |
|---|---|---|
| Cameron; Dunsire |

Mosset Park, Forres, Forres
Referee: K Hadden
