= 2012–13 North of Scotland Cup =

2012–13 AJG Parcels North of Scotland Cup
Tournament details
- Country: Scotland
- Teams: 14

Final positions
- Champions: Nairn County
- Runner-up: Wick Academy

Tournament statistics
- Matches played: 12
- Goals scored: 53 (4.42 per match)
- Top goal scorer(s): Conor Gethins (5)

The 2012–13 North of Scotland Cup began on 28 July 2012 and ended on 20 October 2012.

This season saw AJG Parcels as the sponsors for the first year with draw taking place at the Tulloch Caledonian Stadium, Inverness 15 June 2012. The draw, like previous years, was split into north and south sections and due to the uneven number of teams competing several clubs receives byes into the second round.

== 2012–13 competing clubs ==
- Brora Rangers
- Clachnacuddin
- Elgin City
- Forres Mechanics
- Fort William
- Halkirk United
- Inverness Caledonian Thistle
- Lossiemouth
- Nairn County
- Ross County
- Rothes
- Strathspey Thistle
- Thurso
- Wick Academy

== First round ==
=== East Section ===
28 July 2012	Fort William	1–4	Lossiemouth	Claggan Park, Fort William
15:00 BST	Lewis Corbett 40'		Ross Archibald 14', 57', 75'; Kevin Grant 42'	Referee: Douglas Ross

31 July 2012	Inverness Caledonian Thistle	1–1 (a.e.t.) (8–9 p)	Forres Mechanics	Mosset Park, Forres
19:30 BST	Ryan Watson 55'		Craig McGovern 78'	Referee: Graham Fraser

31 July 2012	Rothes	1–4	Nairn County F.C.	Mackessack Park, Rothes
20:00 BST	Sean McIntosh 89' (pen.)		Conor Gethins 49', 61'; Andrew Neill 60'; Robert Duncanson 64'	Referee: Thomas Shaw

=== North Section ===
31 July 2012	Wick Academy	7–1	Halkirk Utd	Harmsworth Park, Wick
20:00 BST	Richard Macadie 16', 83' (Pen.); Bryan McKiddie 22'; Stevie Cunningham 39'; Sam Mackay 51', 65'; Gary Manson 57'; Michael Steven (red card) 26'	Report	Chris Sutherland 81'; Colin Davidson (red card) 49'	Referee: Graham Elder

1 August 2012	Golspie Sutherland	0–4	Brora Rangers	King George V Park, Golspie
20:00 BST

== Second round ==
=== East Section ===
7 August 2012	Nairn County	4–1	Lossiemouth F.C.	Station Park, Nairn
20:00 BST

8 August 2012	Strathspey Thistle	0–2	Forres Mechanics	Seafield Park, Grantown-on-Spey
20:00 BST

=== North Section ===
8 August 2012	Clachnacuddin	1–3	Wick Academy	Grant Street Park, Inverness
20:00 BST

8 August 2012	Thurso	0–7	Brora Rangers	Harmsworth Park, Wick
20:00 BST

== Semi finals ==
=== East Section ===
11 September 2012	Nairn County	3–2	Forres Mechanics	Station Park, Nairn
20:00 BST	John Cameron 2'; Robert Duncanson 48', 80'	Report	Kevin Duguid 1'; Kyle Scott 65'

=== North Section ===
12 September 2012	Wick Academy	3–0	Brora Rangers	Harmsworth Park, Wick
20:00 BST	Craig Shearer 21'; Richard Macadie 23'; James Pickles 49'	Report		Referee: Graham Elder

== Final ==
20 October 2012
15:00 BST

Wick Academy	1–2 (a.e.t.)	Nairn County
Craig Shearer 77'	Report	Robbie Duncanson 6'; John Cameron 102'

Grant Street Park, Inverness
Attendance: 1319
Referee: Douglas Ross
