= 2014–15 Scottish Cup =

2014–15 William Hill Scottish Cup
Tournament details
- Country: Scotland
- Teams: 90

Final positions
- Champions: Inverness CT
- Runners-up: Falkirk

Tournament statistics
- Matches played: 105
- Goals scored: 369 (3.51 per match)

The 2014–15 Scottish Cup was the 130th season of Scotland's most prestigious football knockout competition. The tournament was sponsored by bookmaker William Hill in what was the fourth season of a five-year partnership.

The defending champions were St Johnstone, who defeated Dundee United in the 2014 final, but were eventually knocked out in the fifth round by Queen of the South.

== Format and calendar ==
22 clubs entered at a preliminary round: two from the Highland League, five from the Lowland League, four qualifying Junior clubs and eleven other clubs affiliated with the Scottish Football Association. Six of these clubs were given byes to the first round, when 14 Highland League clubs, six Lowland League clubs and 2 other clubs with National Club Licensing approval enter.

In the second round, all 10 Scottish League Two clubs entered, along with the top two clubs from the previous season's Highland League, the top two clubs from the previous season's Lowland League and the 18 winners of the first round ties. All 10 Scottish League One clubs and six Scottish Championship clubs started in the third round, while the remaining four Championship clubs and all 12 Scottish Premiership clubs entered in the fourth round.

The calendar for the 2014–15 competition is as follows:

Round	Draw date	First match date	Fixtures		Clubs
Round	Draw date	First match date	Original	Replays	Clubs
Preliminary round	Thursday 17 July 2014	Saturday 16 August 2014	8	2	90 → 82
First round	Tuesday 19 August 2014	Saturday 13 September 2014	18	1	82 → 64
Second round	Monday 15 September 2014	Saturday 4 October 2014	16	3	64 → 48
Third round	Monday 6 October 2014	Saturday 1 November 2014	16	4	48 → 32
Fourth round	Monday 3 November 2014	Saturday 29 November 2014	16	4	32 → 16
Fifth round	Monday 1 December 2014	Saturday 7 February 2015	8	1	16 → 8
Quarter-finals	Monday 9 February 2015	Saturday 7 March 2015	4	1	8 → 4
Semi-finals	Sunday 8 March 2015	Saturday 18 April 2015	2	N/A	4 → 2
Final	N/A	Saturday 30 May 2015	1	N/A	2 → 1

== Preliminary round ==
The preliminary round draw took place on 17 July 2014 at Commonwealth House, Glasgow.

This round is contested entirely by non-league clubs:

- Two clubs from the Highland Football League (Cove Rangers and Fort William);
- Five clubs from the Lowland Football League (Dalbeattie Star, Edinburgh City, Edinburgh University, Gala Fairydean Rovers and Vale of Leithen);
- Eleven clubs from the South of Scotland League, East of Scotland League and other leagues (Burntisland Shipyard, Civil Service Strollers, Coldstream, Girvan, Glasgow University, Golspie Sutherland, Hawick Royal Albert, Lothian Thistle HV, Newton Stewart, St Cuthbert Wanderers, Wigtown & Bladnoch); and
- Four qualifiers from the Scottish Junior Football Association (Auchinleck Talbot, Bo'ness United, Culter and Hurlford United)

Six clubs were given byes to the first round (Bo'ness United, Coldstream, Culter, Dalbeattie Star, Girvan and Golspie Sutherland).

16 August 2014	Lothian Thistle HV	3–0	Burntisland Shipyard	Saugton Enclosure
15:00		Report

16 August 2014	Auchinleck Talbot	5–1	St Cuthbert Wanderers	Beechwood Park
15:00

16 August 2014	Hurlford United	2–2	Edinburgh University	Blair Park
15:00

16 August 2014	Glasgow University	1–9	Cove Rangers	Garscube Sports Complex - Field 3
15:00

16 August 2014	Vale of Leithen	0–1	Gala Fairydean Rovers	Victoria Park
15:00

16 August 2014	Newton Stewart	2–2	Hawick Royal Albert	Blairmount Park
15:00

16 August 2014	Edinburgh City	5–0	Fort William	Meadowbank Stadium
15:00

16 August 2014	Wigtown & Bladnoch	1–2	Civil Service Strollers	Trammondford Park
15:00

=== Replays ===
23 August 2014	Hawick Royal Albert	3–0	Newton Stewart	Albert Park
15:00	G Ramsay 51'; N Cairns 56'; N Ramsay 71'

23 August 2014	Edinburgh University	0–5	Hurlford United	Pennypit Park
15:00			McGregor 13'; Kean 44', 49', 61'; P McKenzie 71'

== First round ==
The first round draw took place on 19 August 2014 at Stirling Management Centre, University of Stirling.

This round is contested entirely by non-league clubs:

13 September 2014	Lossiemouth	0–4	Turriff United
15:00

13 September 2014	Deveronvale	0–1	Nairn County
15:00

13 September 2014	Selkirk	0–4	Bo'ness United
15:00

13 September 2014	Gretna 2008	2–1	Gala Fairydean Rovers
15:00

13 September 2014	Culter	4–2	Strathspey Thistle
15:00

13 September 2014	Clachnacuddin	1–7	Hurlford United
15:00

13 September 2014	Rothes	0–4	Banks O'Dee
15:00

13 September 2014	Preston Athletic	1–2	Threave Rovers
15:00

13 September 2014	Forres Mechanics	4–1	Civil Service Strollers
15:00

13 September 2014	Huntly	2–1	Wick Academy
15:00

13 September 2014	Cove Rangers	9–0	Hawick Royal Albert
15:00

13 September 2014	Keith	1–3	Formartine United
15:00

13 September 2014	Edinburgh City	2–1	Coldstream
15:00

13 September 2014	Fraserburgh	0–0	Linlithgow Rose
15:00

13 September 2014	Lothian Thistle HV	0–1	East Kilbride
15:00

13 September 2014	Golspie Sutherland	1–4	Dalbeattie Star
15:00

13 September 2014	Auchinleck Talbot	5–0	Buckie Thistle
15:00

13 September 2014	Whitehill Welfare	3–1	Girvan
15:00

=== Replay ===
20 September 2014	Linlithgow Rose	2–1	Fraserburgh
15:00

== Second round ==
The second round draw took place on 15 September 2014 at 2pm at Hampden Park.

This round is contested entirely by all the round 1 winners, the top 2 from last season's Lowland & Highland leagues & all those clubs competing in Scottish League Two:

4 October 2014	Linlithgow Rose	5–1	Dalbeattie Star	Prestonfield, Linlithgow
15:00				Attendance: 645; Referee: David Lowe

4 October 2014	Edinburgh City	2–1	Auchinleck Talbot	Meadowbank Stadium, Edinburgh
15:00				Attendance: 573; Referee: Mike Roncone

4 October 2014	Nairn County	2–1	Huntly	Station Park, Nairn
15:00				Attendance: 207; Referee: Graham Elder

4 October 2014	Arbroath	2–2	Montrose	Gayfield Park, Arbroath
15:00				Attendance: 902; Referee: Nick Walsh

4 October 2014	East Fife	7–0	Threave Rovers	Bayview Stadium, Methil
15:00				Attendance: 417; Referee: Gavin Ross

4 October 2014	Spartans	3–3	East Kilbride	Ainslie Park, Edinburgh
15:00				Attendance: 285; Referee: David Munro

4 October 2014	Bo'ness United	7–1	Culter	Newtown Park, Bo'ness
15:00				Attendance: 660; Referee: Grant Irvine

4 October 2014	Berwick Rangers	2–0	Formartine United	Shielfield Park, Berwick-upon-Tweed
15:00				Attendance: 347; Referee: Alan Newlands

4 October 2014	Brora Rangers	5–0	Banks O'Dee	Dudgeon Park, Brora
15:00				Attendance: 250; Referee: Steven Reid

4 October 2014	Cove Rangers	1–2	Annan Athletic	Allan Park, Cove Bay
15:00				Attendance: 240; Referee: Craig Napier

4 October 2014	Elgin City	0–0	Forres Mechanics	Borough Briggs, Elgin
15:00				Attendance: 1,128; Referee: Graham Fraser

4 October 2014	Whitehill Welfare	0–1	East Stirlingshire	Ferguson Park, Rosewell
15:00				Attendance: 350; Referee: Steven Kirkland

4 October 2014	Inverurie Loco Works	0–3	Hurlford United	Harlaw Park, Inverurie
15:00				Attendance: 385; Referee: Graham Beaton

4 October 2014	Gretna 2008	0–1	Queen's Park	Raydale Park, Gretna
15:00				Attendance: 380; Referee: Mike Taylor

4 October 2014	Turriff United	0–3	Clyde	The Haughs, Turriff
15:00				Attendance: 494; Referee: Ryan Milne

5 October 2014	Stirling University	1–4	Albion Rovers	Forthbank Stadium, Stirling
15:00				Attendance: 292; Referee: Colin Steven

=== Replays ===
11 October 2014	East Kilbride	1–5	Spartans	K Park, East Kilbride
14:00				Attendance: 421; Referee: David Munro

11 October 2014	Montrose	1–3 (a.e.t.)	Arbroath	Links Park, Montrose
14:00				Attendance: 789; Referee: Nick Walsh

11 October 2014	Forres Mechanics	1–3	Elgin City	Mosset Park, Forres
15:00				Attendance: 865; Referee: Graham Fraser

== Third round ==
The third round draw took place on 6 October 2014 at 2pm at the Usher Hall, Edinburgh.

This round is contested entirely by all the round 2 winners, all those clubs currently competing in Scottish League One & clubs currently competing in the Scottish Championship with the 6 lowest places from last season.

1 November 2014	Hurlford United	1–1	Stirling Albion	Blair Park, Hurlford
14:00	Kean 10'		Smith 78'	Attendance: 551

1 November 2014	Linlithgow Rose	0–2	Raith Rovers	Prestonfield, Linlithgow
14:00				Attendance: 2250

1 November 2014	East Fife	2–3	Berwick Rangers	Bayview Stadium, Methil
15:00				Attendance: 477

1 November 2014	Forfar Athletic	1–3	Cowdenbeath	Station Park, Forfar
15:00				Attendance: 592

1 November 2014	Edinburgh City	2–3	Brora Rangers	Meadowbank Stadium, Edinburgh
15:00				Attendance: 601

1 November 2014	Stenhousemuir	1–2	Brechin City	Ochilview Park, Stenhousemuir
15:00				Attendance: 451

1 November 2014	Arbroath	2–1	Nairn County	Gayfield Park, Arbroath
15:00

1 November 2014	Elgin City	4–4	Bo'ness United	Borough Briggs, Elgin
15:00

1 November 2014	Annan Athletic	3–2	Livingston	Galabank, Annan
15:00				Attendance: 560

1 November 2014	Dumbarton	0–1	Rangers	Bet Butler Stadium, Dumbarton
15:00				Attendance: 1878

1 November 2014	Queen's Park	1–2	Albion Rovers	Excelsior Stadium, Airdrie
15:00

1 November 2014	Greenock Morton	0–0	Airdrieonians	Cappielow Park, Greenock
15:00				Attendance: 1420

1 November 2014	Ayr United	1–1	Alloa Athletic	Somerset Park, Ayr
15:00

1 November 2014	Spartans	2–0	Clyde	Ainslie Park, Edinburgh
15:00

1 November 2014	Peterhead	0–1	Stranraer	Balmoor, Peterhead
15:00

2 November 2014	East Stirlingshire	1–4	Dunfermline Athletic	Ochilview Park, Stenhousemuir
15:00

=== Replays ===
8 November 2014	Bo'ness United	5–4	Elgin City	Newtown Park, Bo'ness
13:30		Report		Attendance: 1,280; Referee: Nick Walsh

8 November 2014	Stirling Albion	2–2 (a.e.t.) (13–12 p)	Hurlford United	Forthbank Stadium, Stirling
15:00		Report		Attendance: 567; Referee: Gavin Ross

11 November 2014	Airdrieonians	0–2	Greenock Morton	Excelsior Stadium, Airdrie
19:45		Report	Barrowman 36', 77'	Attendance: 668; Referee: George Salmond

11 November 2014	Alloa Athletic	4–0	Ayr United	Indodrill Stadium, Alloa
19:45	Buchanan 24'; Meggatt 28'; Docherty 33', 60'	Report		Attendance: 420; Referee: Don Robertson

== Fourth round ==
The fourth round draw took place on 3 November 2014 at 2pm at Hampden Park, Glasgow live on Sky Sports News HQ.

This round was contested entirely by all the round 3 winners, the clubs currently competing in Scottish Championship with the 4 highest places from last season & all clubs currently competing in the Scottish Premiership.

29 November 2014	Dundee	2–1	Aberdeen	Dens Park, Dundee
12:15	Konrad 4'; Clarkson 90'	Report	Konrad 17' (o.g.)	Attendance: 5,956; Referee: McLean

29 November 2014	Bo'ness United	0–5	Arbroath	Newtown Park, Bo'ness
13:30		Report	S. Murray 27', 69', 75'; P. McManus 68', 76'	Attendance: 1,769; Referee: Craig Charleston

29 November 2014	St Johnstone	2–1	Ross County	McDiarmid Park, Perth
15:00	O'Halloran 7'; McFadden 12'	Report	Jervis 63'	Attendance: 2,383; Referee: John Beaton

29 November 2014	St Mirren	1–1	Inverness CT	St Mirren Park, Paisley
15:00	McAusland 17'	Report	Meekings 63'	Attendance: 1,957; Referee: Calum Murray

29 November 2014	Stirling Albion	0–2	Raith Rovers	Forthbank Stadium, Stirling
15:00		Report	McKay 44'; Anderson 54'	Attendance: 912; Referee: Greg Aitken

29 November 2014	Queen of the South	4–1	Brora Rangers	Palmerston Park, Dumfries
15:00	Lyle 3'; Reilly 61'; Russell 71'; Kidd 80'	Report	A. Greig 65'	Attendance: 1,434; Referee: John McKendrick

29 November 2014	Stranraer	2–2	Dunfermline Athletic	Stair Park, Stranraer
15:00		Report		Attendance: 489; Referee: Des Roache

29 November 2014	Falkirk	1–0	Cowdenbeath	Falkirk Stadium, Falkirk
15:00	Sibbald 73'	Report		Attendance: 1,237; Referee: Alan Muir

29 November 2014	Spartans	2–1	Greenock Morton	Ainslie Park, Edinburgh
15:00		Report		Attendance: 1,288; Referee: Euan Anderson

29 November 2014	Berwick Rangers	1–1	Albion Rovers	Shielfield Park, Berwick-upon-Tweed
15:00		Report		Attendance: 439; Referee: Mat Northcroft

29 November 2014	Annan Athletic	1–1	Brechin City	Galabank, Annan
15:00		Report		Attendance: 440; Referee: Barry Cook

29 November 2014	Alloa Athletic	1–2	Hibernian	Indodrill Stadium, Alloa
15:00		Report		Attendance: 2,138; Referee: Bobby Madden

29 November 2014	Motherwell	1–2	Dundee United	Fir Park, Motherwell
15:00		Report		Attendance: 4,827; Referee: Craig Thomson

29 November 2014	Partick Thistle	2–0	Hamilton Academical	Firhill Stadium, Maryhill, Glasgow
15:00		Report		Attendance: 2,467; Referee: Kevin Clancy

30 November 2014	Rangers	3–0	Kilmarnock	Ibrox Stadium, Glasgow
12:45	Law 19', 84'; Boyd 72'	Report		Attendance: 14,412; Referee: Brian Colvin

30 November 2014	Heart of Midlothian	0–4	Celtic	Tynecastle Stadium, Gorgie, Edinburgh
15:15		Report	Van Dijk 29', 61'; Guidetti 52' (pen.); Stokes 54'	Attendance: 12,676; Referee: William Collum

=== Replays ===
2 December 2014	Inverness CT	4–0	St Mirren	Caledonian Stadium, Inverness
19:45	Warren 20'; Tansey 23' (pen.); Williams 67'; Shinnie 90+2'	Report		Attendance: 1,326; Referee: Calum Murray

9 December 2014	Dunfermline Athletic	1–3	Stranraer	East End Park, Dunfermline
19:45	Millen 62' (pen.)	Report	Winter 32'; Stirling 57'; Longworth 90'	Attendance: 1,436; Referee: Des Roache

9 December 2014	Albion Rovers	0–1	Berwick Rangers	Cliftonhill, Coatbridge
19:45	Mullin (yellow card) 83' (red card)	Report	Russell 80'	Attendance: 311; Referee: Mat Northcroft

9 December 2014	Brechin City	4–2	Annan Athletic	Glebe Park, Brechin
19:45	Jackson 4', 11', 27'; Hamilton 72'	Report	Davidson 68'; Hopkirk 76'	Attendance: 224; Referee: Barry Cook

== Fifth round ==
The fifth round draw took place on 1 December 2014 at 2pm at Hampden Park, Glasgow live on Sky Sports News HQ.

This round is contested entirely by all the round 4 winners.

7 February 2015	Dundee	0–2	Celtic	Dens Park, Dundee
12:30		Report	Griffiths 7'; Johansen 47'	Attendance: 7,525; Referee: John Beaton

7 February 2015	Queen of the South	2–0	St Johnstone	Palmerston Park, Dumfries
15:00	Lyle 48'; Reilly 90'	Report		Attendance: 3,043; Referee: Steven McLean

7 February 2015	Hibernian	3–1	Arbroath	Easter Road, Edinburgh
15:00	Djédjé 42'; Gordon 60' (o.g.); McGeouch 68'	Report	Stewart 17'	Attendance: 9,065; Referee: Andrew Dallas

7 February 2015	Falkirk	2–1	Brechin City	Falkirk Stadium, Falkirk
15:00	McCracken 11'; Smith 79'	Report	Trouten 55' (pen.)	Attendance: 2,083; Referee: John McKendrick

7 February 2015	Partick Thistle	1–2	Inverness CT	Firhill Stadium, Maryhill, Glasgow
15:00	Taylor 67'	Report	Watkins 16'; Tansey 27'	Attendance: 2,915; Referee: Willie Collum

7 February 2015	Spartans	1–1	Berwick Rangers	Ainslie Park, Edinburgh
15:00	MacKinnon 90'	Report	Willis 4'	Attendance: 2,500; Referee: Don Robertson

8 February 2015	Stranraer	0–3	Dundee United	Stair Park, Stranraer
12:30		Report	Erskine 21'; Dow 27', 31'	Attendance: 1,491; Referee: Kevin Clancy

8 February 2015	Rangers	1–2	Raith Rovers	Ibrox Stadium, Glasgow
15:00	Vučkić 62'	Report	Conroy 54'; Nadé 75'	Attendance: 11,422; Referee: Bobby Madden

=== Replay ===
17 February 2015	Berwick Rangers	1–0	Spartans	Shielfield Park, Berwick-upon-Tweed
20:00	Lavery 29'	Report		Attendance: 2,003; Referee: Greg Aitken

== Quarter-finals ==
The quarter-final draw took place on 9 February 2015 at 2pm at Hampden Park, Glasgow live on Sky Sports News HQ.

This round is contested entirely by all the round 5 winners.

6 March 2015	Queen of the South	0–1	Falkirk	Palmerston Park, Dumfries
19:35		Report	Sibbald 34'	Attendance: 2,833; Referee: Kevin Clancy

8 March 2015	Hibernian	4–0	Berwick Rangers	Easter Road, Edinburgh
12:45	Cummings 26'; Stevenson 28'; Stanton 66'; Fontaine 82'	Report		Attendance: 11,529; Referee: Bobby Madden

8 March 2015	Dundee United	1–1	Celtic	Tannadice Park, Dundee
15:30	Paton (red card) 11'; Çiftçi 45' (pen.); Dixon (red card) 49'	Report	Van Dijk (red card) 11'; Griffiths 71'	Attendance: 10,504; Referee: Craig Thomson

10 March 2015	Inverness CT	1–0	Raith Rovers	Caledonian Stadium, Inverness
19:45	Devine 63'	Report		Attendance: 2,276; Referee: Crawford Allan

=== Replay ===
18 March 2015	Celtic	4–0	Dundee United	Celtic Park, Glasgow
19:45	Denayer 17'; Griffiths 57'; Commons 79'; Stokes (red card) 87'; Van Dijk 90'	Report	McGowan (red card) 89'	Attendance: 28,847; Referee: Calum Murray

== Semi-finals ==
The semi-final draw took place on 8 March 2015 at Tannadice Park, Dundee live on Sky Sports 1 following the Dundee United v Celtic quarter-final.

This round is contested entirely by all the quarter-final winners & matches will take place at Hampden Park.

18 April 2015	Hibernian	0–1	Falkirk	Hampden Park, Glasgow
12:15		Report	Sibbald 75'	Attendance: 21,227; Referee: John Beaton

19 April 2015	Inverness CT	3–2 (a.e.t.)	Celtic	Hampden Park, Glasgow
12:15	Tansey 58' (pen.); Ofere 96'; Raven 117'	Report	Van Dijk 18'; Gordon (red card) 55'; Guidetti 103'	Attendance: 28,643; Referee: Steven McLean

== Final ==
30 May 2015
15:00

Falkirk	1–2	Inverness CT
Grant 80'	Report	Watkins 38'; Tremarco (red card) 75'; Vincent 86'

Hampden Park, Glasgow
Attendance: 37,149
Referee: Willie Collum

== Media coverage ==
From round four onwards, selected matches from the Scottish Cup are broadcast live in Ireland and the UK by BBC Scotland and Sky Sports. BBC Scotland has the option to show one tie per round with Sky Sports showing two ties per round with one replay also, Sky Sports show both semi-finals live with one also on BBC Scotland & both channels screen the final live.

These matches were broadcast live on television.

Round	Sky Sports	BBC Scotland
Fourth round	Rangers vs Kilmarnock; Hearts vs Celtic	Dundee vs Aberdeen
Fifth round	Dundee vs Celtic; Stranraer vs Dundee United	Rangers vs Raith Rovers
Quarter-finals	Hibernian vs Berwick Rangers; Dundee United vs Celtic	Queen of the South vs Falkirk
Semi-finals	Hibernian vs Falkirk; Inverness CT vs Celtic	Hibernian vs Falkirk
Final	Falkirk vs Inverness CT	
