= 2011–12 North of Scotland Cup =

2011–12 Nutel Communications North of Scotland Cup
Tournament details
- Country: Scotland
- Teams: 14

Tournament statistics
- Matches played: 12
- Goals scored: 47 (3.92 per match)
- Top goal scorer(s): Lee Fraser, Forres Mechanics (5)

The 2011–12 North of Scotland Cup began on 23 July 2011 and ended on 11 September 2011.

This season saw Nutel Communications as the sponsors for the second year with draw taking place at their headquarters in Inverness. The draw, like previous years, was split into north and south sections but without Ross County and Elgin City who withdrew from the competition.

== 2011-12 Competing Clubs ==
- Brora Rangers
- Clachnacuddin
- Forres Mechanics
- Fort William
- Golspie Sutherland
- Halkirk United
- Inverness Caledonian Thistle
- Lossiemouth
- Nairn County
- Rothes
- Strathspey Thistle
- Thurso
- Wick Academy

== First round ==
North Section

- Thurso 1-4 Brora Rangers
- Wick Academy 1-2 Halkirk United
- Golspie Sutherland 1-2 Clachnacuddin

South Section

- Lossiemouth 1-1 Rothes AET Rothes won 4-2 on penalties
- Fort William 3-4 Forres Mechanics

Bye: Strathspey Thistle, Inverness Caledonian Thistle, Nairn County

== Second round ==
North Section

- Halkirk United 1-1 Clachnacuddin AET Halkirk won 3-2 on penalties (at Harmsworth Park, Wick)
- Brora Rangers 3-5 Inverness Caledonian Thistle

South Section

- Rothes 1-2 Forres Mechanics
- Nairn County 3-1 Strathspey Thistle

== Semi finals ==
North Section

- Inverness Caledonian Thistle 1-0 Halkirk United (at Harmsworth Park, Wick)

South Section

- Forres Mechanics 2-0 Nairn County

== Final ==
- Inverness Caledonian Thistle 4-3 Forres Mechanics (at Mosset Park, Forres)
