= 2010–11 North of Scotland Cup =

Tournament details
- Country: Scotland
- Teams: 14

Tournament statistics
- Matches played: 13
- Goals scored: 57 (4.38 per match)

The 2010–11 North of Scotland Cup was won by Forres Mechanics.

== 2010–11 Competing Clubs ==
- Brora Rangers
- Clachnacuddin
- Forres Mechanics
- Fort William
- Golspie Sutherland
- Halkirk Utd
- Inverness Caledonian Thistle
- Lossiemouth
- Muir of Ord
- Nairn County
- Rothes
- Strathspey Thistle
- Thurso
- Wick Academy

== First round ==
=== North Section ===
24 July 2010	Clachnacuddin	2 – 1	Halkirk Utd	Grant Street Park, Inverness
15:00 BST

28 July 2012	Golspie Sutherland	1 – 1 (a.e.t.) (1 – 3 p)	Inverness Caledonian Thistle	King George V Park, Golspie
20:00 BST

28 July 2010	Wick Academy	5 – 2	Brora Rangers	Harmsworth Park, Wick
20:00 BST

=== East Section ===
27 July 2010	Fort William	3 – 1	Muir of Ord Rovers	Claggan Park, Fort William
20:00 BST

27 August 2010	Nairn County	4 – 0	Strathspey Thistle	Seafield Park, Grantown-on-Spey
20:00 BST

28 July 2010	Rothes	1 – 3	Forres Mechanics	Mackessack Park, Rothes
19:30 BST

== Second round ==
=== North Section ===
10 August 2010	Clachnacuddin	3 – 4	Inverness Caledonian Thistle	Grant Street Park, Inverness
19:30 BST

11 August 2010	Thurso	2 – 2 (a.e.t.) (4 – 5 p)	Wick Academy	Harmsworth Park, Wick
20:00 BST

=== East Section ===
10 August 2010	Fort William	2 – 4	Nairn County	Claggan Park, Fort William
20:00 BST

11 August 2012	Forres Mechanics	3 – 2	Lossiemouth	Mosset Park, Forres
20:00 BST

== Semi finals ==
=== North Section ===
24 August 2012	Inverness Caledonian Thistle	1 – 3	Wick Academy	Harmsworth Park, Wick
19:30 BST

=== East Section ===
24 August 2010	Forres Mechanics	1 – 0	Nairn County	Mosset Park, Forres
20:00 BST

== Final ==
11 September 2012
15:00 BST

Wick Academy	2 – 3	Forres Mechanics

Dudgeon Park, Brora
