= North of Scotland Football Association =

The North of Scotland Football Association is a local football association affiliated to the Scottish Football Association. Member clubs are drawn from across the Highlands and Moray and includes teams playing in the Scottish Professional Football League, the Highland League and the North Caledonian League.

== Competitions ==
The main competition organised by the association is the North of Scotland Cup.

== Member clubs ==
=== Scottish Professional Football League ===
- Inverness CT
- Ross County

=== Scottish Highland Football League ===
- Brora Rangers
- Clachnacuddin
- Forres Mechanics
- Lossiemouth
- Nairn County
- Rothes
- Strathspey Thistle
- Wick Academy

=== North Caledonian Football League ===
- Fort William
- Golspie Sutherland
- Halkirk United
- Thurso
