= 1997–98 Highland Football League =

Highland League
- Season: 1997–1998
- Champions: Huntly

The 1997–1998 Highland Football League was won by Huntly for the fifth year in a row, the greatest number of consecutive Highland League titles won by any club. Nairn County finished bottom.

== Table ==
Pos	Team	Pld	W	D	L	GF	GA	GD	Pts
1	Huntly (C)	30	22	5	3	92	32	+60	71
2	Fraserburgh	30	21	5	4	69	31	+38	68
3	Peterhead	30	20	5	5	88	34	+54	65
4	Cove Rangers	30	19	4	7	100	39	+61	61
5	Elgin City	30	16	7	7	59	33	+26	55
6	Keith	30	15	6	9	65	54	+11	51
7	Forres Mechanics	30	13	6	11	64	58	+6	45
8	Clachnacuddin	30	14	3	13	59	57	+2	45
9	Deveronvale	30	11	6	13	59	61	−2	39
10	Buckie Thistle	30	11	6	13	42	47	−5	39
11	Brora Rangers	30	10	4	16	54	66	−12	34
12	Lossiemouth	30	9	6	15	39	66	−27	33
13	Rothes	30	7	8	15	41	56	−15	29
14	Wick Academy	30	5	5	20	40	74	−34	20
15	Fort William	30	3	4	23	31	130	−99	13
16	Nairn County	30	3	3	24	30	94	−64	12

Source: Scottish Football Historical Archive - Highland League Final Tables
Rules for classification: 1) points; 2) goal difference; 3) number of goals scored.
(C) Champions
