= 1996–97 Highland Football League =

Highland League
- Season: 1996–1997
- Champions: Huntly

The 1996–1997 Highland Football League was won by Huntly for the fourth year in a row. Fort William finished bottom.

== Table ==
| Pos | Team | Pld | W | D | L | GF | GA | GD | Pts |
|---|---|---|---|---|---|---|---|---|---|
| 1 | Huntly (C) | 30 | 23 | 4 | 3 | 86 | 26 | +60 | 73 |
| 2 | Keith | 30 | 21 | 3 | 6 | 76 | 36 | +40 | 66 |
| 3 | Peterhead | 30 | 17 | 7 | 6 | 77 | 30 | +47 | 58 |
| 4 | Lossiemouth | 30 | 18 | 4 | 8 | 66 | 31 | +35 | 58 |
| 5 | Clachnacuddin | 30 | 16 | 5 | 9 | 59 | 46 | +13 | 53 |
| 6 | Fraserburgh | 30 | 15 | 7 | 8 | 56 | 38 | +18 | 52 |
| 7 | Cove Rangers | 30 | 15 | 5 | 10 | 84 | 47 | +37 | 50 |
| 8 | Deveronvale | 30 | 16 | 2 | 12 | 55 | 54 | +1 | 50 |
| 9 | Elgin City | 30 | 13 | 4 | 13 | 64 | 66 | −2 | 43 |
| 10 | Wick Academy | 30 | 9 | 8 | 13 | 41 | 46 | −5 | 35 |
| 11 | Rothes | 30 | 9 | 8 | 13 | 44 | 52 | −8 | 35 |
| 12 | Forres Mechanics | 30 | 8 | 5 | 17 | 40 | 60 | −20 | 29 |
| 13 | Buckie Thistle | 30 | 8 | 4 | 18 | 41 | 55 | −14 | 28 |
| 14 | Brora Rangers | 30 | 5 | 10 | 15 | 43 | 88 | −45 | 25 |
| 15 | Nairn County | 30 | 4 | 3 | 23 | 21 | 93 | −72 | 15 |
| 16 | Fort William | 30 | 2 | 3 | 25 | 31 | 116 | −85 | 9 |

Source: Scottish Football Historical Archive - Highland League Final Tables
Rules for classification: 1) points; 2) goal difference; 3) number of goals scored.
(C) Champions
