= Gary Farquhar =

Scottish footballer

Personal information
- Full name: Gary Robert Farquhar
- Date of birth: 23 February 1971 (age 55)
- Place of birth: Wick, Scotland
- Position: Midfielder

Senior career*
Years	Team	Apps	(Gls)
19??–1994	Brora Rangers		
1994–1998	St Johnstone	41	(4)
1998–1999	Inverness Caledonian Thistle	11	(0)
1999–2009	Wick Academy	104	(19)
2010–2012	Inverness City	15	(2)
2012–2014	Fort William		
2014	Rothes		
Total		162	(24)
- * Club domestic league appearances and goals

Gary Robert Farquhar (born 23 February 1971) is a former professional footballer who is assistant manager at Clachnacuddin in the Scottish Highland Football League.
