= Wayne Mackintosh =

Scottish footballer

Personal information
- Full name: Wayne Alexander Mackintosh
- Date of birth: 8 October 1986 (age 40)
- Place of birth: Inverness, Scotland
- Position: Midfielder

Team information
- Current team: Nairn County (manager)

Youth career
- –2004: Nairn County

Senior career*
Years	Team	Apps	(Gls)
2004–2017	Nairn County	332	(25)
2017–2020	Formartine United	66	(6)
2019–2020	→ Clachnacuddin (loan)		
2021–2022	Rothes	12	(0)
2022–	Nairn County	64	(0)

Managerial career
- 2025–: Nairn County
- * Club domestic league appearances and goals as of 3 May 2025

Wayne Mackintosh (born 8 October 1986) is a Scottish football manager and former player who is currently the manager at Nairn County. He has previously played for Formartine and Rothes.

== Career ==
=== Nairn County ===
Mackintosh started his playing career at Highland Football League club, Nairn County coming through the youth ranks making his debut as a 16 year old in 2004. Mackintosh captained the side and played 332 games for Nairn until expiry of his contract in July 2017.

=== Formartine United ===
In July 2017 Mackintosh signed for Highland Football League club, Formartine following his contract expiring with Nairn County. Mackintosh played 66 games for Formartine and won The Highland Football League and Aberdeenshire Cup in his first season. He added the Aberdeenshire Shield in 2018/19.

=== Clachnacuddin (loan) ===
In January 2020, Mackintosh joined Highland Football League club, Clachnacuddin on a short loan.

=== Rothes ===
In July 2021, Mackintosh joined Highland Football League club, Rothes. During his time there he won the North of Scotland Cup.

=== Return to Nairn ===
On 15 September 2022, Mackintosh returned to Nairn County aged 34. On 12 November 2023, Mackintosh won his 4th North of Scotland Cup after defeating Ross County 5–4 (a.e.t).

On 26 April 2024 it was announced that Mackintosh would be part of Ross Tokely's management team as a player / coach.

On 11 April 2025, Mackintosh decided to end his playing career and was appointed as Nairn County manager on the 29th.

== Honours ==
Nairn County

- Higland League Cup: 2010–11
- North of Scotland Cup: 2005–06, 2023–24

Formartine United

- Higland League Cup: 2017–18
- Aberdeenshire Cup: 2017–18
- Aberdeenshire Shield: 2018–19

Rothes

- North of Scotland Cup: 2021–22
