= 2011–12 North Caledonian Football League =

North Caledonian Football League
- Season: 2011–12
- Champions: Halkirk United

The 2011–12 North Caledonian Football League was won by Halkirk United.

== Table ==
Pos	Team	Pld	W	D	L	GF	GA	GD	Pts
1	Halkirk United (C)	14	10	3	1	49	20	+29	33
2	Muir of Ord Rovers	14	9	3	2	36	16	+20	30
3	Golspie Sutherland	14	8	4	2	43	20	+23	28
4	Alness United	14	6	2	6	26	18	+8	20
5	Dingwall Thistle	14	6	1	7	31	28	+3	19
6	Thurso	14	5	1	8	27	27	0	16
7	Clachnacuddin reserves	14	3	1	10	24	52	−28	10
8	Balintore	14	0	3	11	18	73	−55	3

Updated to match(es) played on 16 May 2012. Source: Scottish Football Historical Archive
Rules for classification: 1) points; 2) goal difference; 3) number of goals scored.
(C) Champions
