= FMFC =

FMFC may refer to:

- Forres Mechanics F.C., a Scottish association football club
- Forward Madison FC, an American association football club
