= Inverness Thistle F.C. =

Former association football club in Scotland

Inverness Thistle
- Full name: Inverness Thistle Football Club
- Nickname: The Jags
- Founded: 1885
- Dissolved: 1994
- Ground: Kingsmills Park; Inverness
- Capacity: 5,000 (600 seated)
Home colours

Inverness Thistle Football Club was a football club playing in the city of Inverness in northern Scotland.

== Formation and timeline ==
They were members of the Highland Football League, winning the championship eight times, including its inaugural season: 1893–94.

They set a postwar record for the heaviest scoring in a Highland League season, with 124 goals (an average of 4.13 per game) in the 1969–70 season, which stood for 45 years before being beaten in 2015 by Brora Rangers. They wore black and red stripes and played their home games at Kingsmills Park. Like many clubs featuring the name "Thistle", they were often known as the Jags.

Thistle applied for membership of the Scottish Football League for the 1973–74 season, but the club lost out to Ferranti Thistle by one vote. It was felt that this was due to clubs in the Central Belt being unwilling to travel to Inverness.

They occasionally qualified for the Scottish Cup. Many regard their most famous result to be the defeat of Kilmarnock by a 3–0 scoreline in season 1984–85.

When two vacancies were recorded in the Scottish League in time for season 1994–95 Thistle decided to again apply for membership. However to improve their chances they decided to merge with city rivals Caledonian who also wanted to apply, as they felt it unlikely both clubs would get both places, and perhaps neither would gain entry if they both applied. This decision was not without controversy. Fans of both clubs bitterly opposed the merger and many tried to stop it. In this they were unsuccessful, and the new entity, Caledonian Thistle (subsequently renamed Inverness Caledonian Thistle) were elected along with Ross County to membership of the Scottish League's Third Division for season 1994–95.

Thistle's last ever match against their rivals Caledonian was played on 11 May 1994, when a crowd of around 2,000 saw Caley beat Thistle 1–0 with Billy Urquhart scoring for Caley.

The last game of Inverness Thistle Football Club was against Lossiemouth on Saturday, 14 May 1994. The club was 110 years old.

Part of Inverness Thistle lives on at the Harmsworth Park, home of Wick Academy, as the floodlight pylons from Kingsmills Park were relocated there for their admission into the Highland League. However, their status is currently unknown, as they were replaced with higher quality floodlights in 2011 in order for Wick to keep their Licence to host games.

In 2016, the club name was revived at amateur level. Although unrelated, Inverness Thistle AFC were part of the Inverness and District Football Association and played at Bught Park. However, their existence was short-lived, with the club folding in July 2018.

In 2024, Inverness Thistle were revived for a third time, with the club entering discussions with the North Caledonian Football League in hopes of joining for the 2025–26 season. In June 2025, it was announced that Inverness Thistle (2024) would be joining the North Caledonian League.

== Kit history ==
Season	Manufacturer	Sponsor
1890–1977	None	None
1977–1979	Admiral	None
1979–1980	None	None
1980–1984	Umbro	None
1984–1986	Umbro	Unknown
1987–1988	Umbro	ATS
1988–1992	Unknown	Unknown
1992–1994	Matchwinner	Tomatin Malt Whisky

== Honours ==
- Highland Football League –
  - Winners (8): 1893–94, 1906–07, 1909–10, 1928–29, 1935–36, 1971–72, 1972–73, 1986–87
    - Runners-up (9): 1894–95, 1895–96, 1901–02, 1902–03, 1920–21, 1925–26, 1968–69, 1970–71, 1973–74
- Highland League Cup –
  - Winners (3): 1970–71, 1972–73, 1987–88
    - Runners-up (3): 1958–59, 1976–77, 1979–80
- North of Scotland Cup –
  - Winners (13): 1892–93, 1893–94, 1912–13, 1930–31, 1934–35, 1938–39, 1945–46, 1952–53, 1959–60, 1977–78, 1981–82, 1984–85, 1987–88
- Inverness Cup –
  - Winners (19): 1905–06, 1908–09, 1924–25, 1926–27, 1927–28, 1932–33, 1933–34, 1934–35, 1935–36, 1938–39, 1953–54, 1973–74, 1975–76, 1980–81, 1981–82, 1983–84, 1987–88, 1990–91, 1993–94
- Scottish Qualifying Cup (North) –
  - Winners (5): 1932–33, 1972–73, 1976–77, 1980–81, 1988–89
- Scottish North Supplementary Cup –
  - Winners (1): 1955–56
