= Scottish Qualifying Cup =

Football competition in Scotland

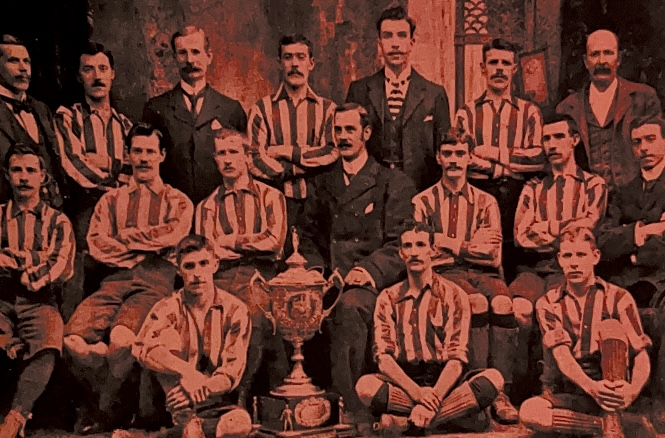
Kilmarnock F.C. with the Scottish Qualifying Cup, following their win in 1897

The Scottish Qualifying Cup was a football competition played in Scotland between 1895 and 2007. During that time, apart from a brief spell in the 1950s, it was the only way for non-league teams to qualify for the Scottish Cup. The Qualifying Cup was open to all full member clubs of the Scottish Football Association, who were not members of the Scottish Premier League or Scottish Football League. In June 2007 the Scottish Football Association announced a new format for the Scottish Cup from season 2007–08 that would allow all full member clubs direct entry into the competition and consequently the Qualifying Cup competition was scrapped.

== History ==
The Qualifying Cup was introduced in 1895 to make the number of entries into the main Scottish Cup more manageable and reduce the number of mis-matched ties in the early rounds, and to give the smaller teams a trophy to play for instead of simply having preliminary rounds; the proposal for a cup was carried 28 votes to 23, the main reason for opposing being that having exemptions was unnecessary and everyone should start at the same stage. The Scottish FA agreed to start the competition on the last Saturday in August, to finish during the calendar year, and the Scottish Cup first round proper starting on the second Saturday in the following January. In its first season, there were 16 clubs exempted to the first round of the competition proper, namely the four semi-finalists from the previous season, the seven other clubs from the Scottish League first division, Queen's Park F.C., and four other clubs voted in.

At the end of the 1896–97 season, the Lanarkshire Football Association proposed abolishing the Qualifying Cup in favour of everyone starting at round 1, on the basis that "the exemption of the leading clubs had been the cause of much of the decadence of football in this country, and it was hastening the end of many in Lanarkshire. The exemption had killed four clubs, and the best was in a perilous state"; this was on the basis that attendances in the Qualifying Cup were too low even to pay expenses. The proposal was defeated by 46 votes to 36.

Although the first Qualifying Cup was played out until a national final, the last sixteen clubs in the competition (i.e. those who had reached the fifth round stage of the Qualifying Cup) would be put through to the first round of the national competition.

The format of having a number of clubs qualify for the competition proper, but still playing to one or two finals, remained the format for the competition's existence, although the number of entrants and qualifying clubs varied. This led to a paradox where teams that had met in the Qualifying Cup could also meet in the competition proper. For example, the Qualifying Cup final in 1928–29 saw Murrayfield Amateurs beat Thornhill, and the two teams were then drawn together in the "official" first round, Murrayfield winning again.

Annbank F.C. won the first-ever Qualifying Cup in 1895–96, beating East Stirlingshire in the final at Underwood Park in Paisley, the ground of Abercorn F.C.; the Shire showed the greater skill, but the Miners, with the veteran "White" Gourlay marshalling the defence, gained something of a smash and grab victory. Annbank reached the second round of the competition proper; the furthest any of the qualifying clubs reached in the first season was Arbroath reaching the quarter-finals (third round).

The furthest in the competition any Qualifying Cup side reached was the semi-finals, Kilmarnock (Qualifying Cup winners in 1896–97) and Stenhousemuir (Qualifying Cup runners-up in 1902–03) both doing so.

Until season 1930–31 the competition was played as a single national competition, although ties were often drawn on a geographical basis so that the final would often be between the best teams in the North and South. From 1908 until 1914 there was also a Consolation Cup for teams eliminated in the earlier rounds; this was a common arrangement in Scottish cup competitions until expanding leagues reduced the time available for extra cup matches.

From 1931 there were separate competitions for the North and South, and additionally in 1946–47 and 1947–48 there was a Midlands competition (won by Forfar Athletic and Montrose respectively, both times beating East Stirlingshire in the final). There was a brief hiatus for three seasons between 1954–55 to 1956–57 when all clubs were given direct entry into the Scottish Cup and the Qualifying Cup was not contested; clubs instead played for the Supplementary Cup (North) and (South).

== Structure ==
In its final form, the competition was divided into two sections; The Qualifying Cup (North) and Qualifying Cup (South). Teams played each other within the North/South regions in a knockout format where teams were drawn against each other randomly. In the draw, the team who was drawn first from each tie was the home team. If the first match finished a draw then a replay was played at the ground of the second team. In the replay, if the scores were still level, extra time was played and penalties used if necessary to decide the winner of the tie.

The four teams which reached the semi-finals (last four) in each region qualified automatically for the Scottish Cup. Hence, eight non-league teams qualified each year for the Scottish Cup.

== Eligible clubs ==
The following clubs were eligible to play in the last competition in 2006–07.

=== Scottish Qualifying Cup (North) ===
- 15 teams in membership of the Highland Football League
  - Brora Rangers
  - Buckie Thistle
  - Clachnacuddin
  - Cove Rangers
  - Deveronvale
  - Forres Mechanics
  - Fort William
  - Fraserburgh
  - Huntly
  - Inverurie Loco Works
  - Keith
  - Lossiemouth
  - Nairn County
  - Rothes
  - Wick Academy
- Golspie Sutherland of the North Caledonian League

=== Scottish Qualifying Cup (South) ===
- 13 teams in membership of the East of Scotland Football League
  - Annan Athletic
  - Civil Service Strollers
  - Coldstream
  - Dalbeattie Star
  - Edinburgh City
  - Edinburgh University
  - Gala Fairydean
  - Hawick Royal Albert
  - Preston Athletic
  - Selkirk
  - Spartans
  - Vale of Leithen
  - Whitehill Welfare
- 4 clubs from the South of Scotland Football League
  - Newton Stewart
  - St Cuthbert Wanderers
  - Threave Rovers
  - Wigtown & Bladnoch
- Burntisland Shipyard of the Kingdom Caledonian League
- Girvan of the SJFA West Region
- Glasgow University of the Caledonian Amateur League

== Records ==
Qualifying Cup (national)

- Most wins: 3 - Leith Athletic and Bathgate.
- Most appearances in the final: 5 - East Stirlingshire.
- Most appearances in the final without winning: 2 - Dykehead and Brechin City.
- Biggest win: Murrayfield Amateurs 8–1 Thornhill, 1928–29.
