= Billy Urquhart =

Scottish footballer

Personal information
- Full name: William Murray Urquhart
- Date of birth: 22 November 1956 (age 69)
- Place of birth: Inverness, Scotland
- Position: Striker

Senior career*
Years	Team	Apps	(Gls)
1972–1980	Caledonian		
1976–1977	Queen's Park		
1978–1980	Rangers	14	(6)
1980–1981	Wigan Athletic	10	(2)
1981–1994	Caledonian	637	(400+)
1994–1995	Inverness Caledonian Thistle	3	(0)
- * Club domestic league appearances and goals

William Murray Urquhart (born 22 November 1956) is a Scottish former professional footballer. He is considered as one of the finest Highland Football League players of his generation, turning out 637 times for Caledonian F.C. either side of spells at Queen's Park, Rangers and Wigan Athletic.

== Early life ==
Urquhart was born in Inverness, Scotland. He attended Central Primary school and Inverness Royal Academy, playing upfront with Inverness Thistle legend David Milroy in the school football side.

== Career ==
Born near Caley's Telford Street ground, Urquhart started his career at Inverness Caledonian. His father played for Inverness Thistle and Clyde in the 1930s and was a part of the 1938–39 Scottish Cup winning squad. Later a trainer at Caley, Billy credits his father with pushing him into football. Billy made his debut away to Huntly in 1972, playing throughout this season before transferring to Queens Park along with two Caley teammates after moving to Glasgow to attend college.

This spell was short lived, with Urquhart dropping out to play for Jordanhill College in the Glasgow Amateur League. Returning from Glasgow, he re-signed for Caledonian and enjoyed a strong season which included trials at Dundee F.C. and Derby County. He moved to Rangers in 1978 for a fee of £15,000, signing off the back of a pre season friendly where he scored two goals against the Glasgow side. He stayed at the club for two years, appearing over 20 times for the team, including appearances in European competitions and the 1979 Scottish League Cup Final, before moving on to Wigan Athletic for a season. Urquhart returned to Inverness with Caledonian in 1981, making 637 appearances and scoring over 400 goals, and stayed at the club until its amalgamation into Inverness Caledonian Thistle in 1994.

Having retired after his testimonial in 1993, Urquhart returned for the final Caledonian vs Thistle derby, scoring the winner despite not being registered, incurring a £200 fine for Caledonian. He stayed at the newly formed club for one season, initially playing for the reserve squad, however he turned out against East Stirlingshire due to injuries, making three appearances in total before retiring.

== Honors ==
- Scottish League Cup: 1978– 1979 Winner

In 2019, Urquhart received a special Heritage Award from the Inverness Caledonian Thistle Hall of Fame.
