= Caledonian F.C. =

Former association football club in Scotland

Caledonian
- Full name: Caledonian Football Club
- Nickname: Caley
- Founded: 1885
- Dissolved: 1994
- Ground: Telford Street Park, Inverness
- Capacity: 5,000 (550 seated)
- League: Highland League
Home colours

Caledonian Football Club was a Scottish football club from the city of Inverness, Highland. It played in the Highland Football League until 1994, when it merged with Inverness Thistle to form Caledonian Thistle, later renamed Inverness Caledonian Thistle.

== Formation ==
Caledonian Football Club was formed in 1885. They were founder members of the Highland Football League in 1893 and wore strips of blue shirts, white shorts and blue socks. Their home ground was Telford Street Park, located beside the Caledonian Canal, and they were known by the nickname Caley.

== History ==
Caledonian won the Highland Football League a record eighteen times. Another Inverness side, Clachnacuddin, equalled this record in 2004. The club's greatest period of league and cup success was in the early 1980s when they won three successive titles under manager Alex Main, a journalist who also wrote the club's centenary book 'Caley All The Way – The First Hundred Years' in 1986. The club won the prestigious Rothmans Football Yearbook Award for outstanding non-league club in 1981–82, Rothmans describing them as one of the outstanding teams of their grade in Britain, let alone Scotland. In 1982–83 their Highland League record of won 23, drew 7, lost 0, made them the first of only two clubs in the postwar era (the other being Brora Rangers in 2014–15) to finish the season as unbeaten champions.

Caledonian, like other Highland League clubs, were prevented from making the step up to the Scottish Football League due to the lack of a pyramid system.

Despite this, they qualified for the Scottish Cup many times, knocking-out larger League clubs on a total of 19 occasions. Notable achievements included knocking out First Division Airdrieonians in 1990 and in 1992 embarking on a run to the fourth round, defeating league sides Stenhousemuir (4–1), Clyde (3–1), before taking Premier Division St Johnstone to a replay, eventually losing 3–0 in Perth in front of a crowd of 10,000.

Caley's last ever match against their rivals Inverness Thistle was played on 11 May 1994, when a crowd of around 2,000 saw Caley beat Thistle 1–0 with Billy Urquhart scoring. Urquhart at the time was an unregistered player and Caley was fined £200.

The last Caledonian game was against Huntly on Saturday 14 May 1994 at Christie Park, Huntly. The match ended 1–1 with Wilson Robertson scoring the Caley goal.

== Kit history ==
Season	Manufacturer	Sponsor
1885–1978	None	None
Aug - Dec 1978	Admiral	None
Dec 1978–1979	None	None
1980–1981	Litesome	None
1981–1982	Litesome	Ness Motors
1982–1983	Litesome	Dickson's
1984–1986	None	Dickson's
1986–1987	None	John G McGregor
1987–1989	Nike	John G McGregor
1989–1990	None	John G McGregor
1990–1991	Umbro	Macrae & Dick
1991–1994	Matchwinner	Macrae & Dick

== Merger with Inverness Thistle ==
In 1993, the Scottish Football League decided to expand and restructure. This meant that two vacancies for membership would be available. Caledonian decided to apply for membership, as did city rivals Inverness Thistle. The SFL suggested that a joint application might be more successful and the boards of Caley and Thistle decided to merge. This decision was met with widespread opposition by supporters of both sides, especially by Caley fans who were confident their club could successfully bid on their own. However, an amalgamation went ahead. The new club, Caledonian Thistle (later Inverness Caledonian Thistle), were granted membership to the Third Division at the beginning of season 1994–95.

== Club ==
- Formed 1885; Defunct 1994 – By amalgamation of Caledonian F.C. and Inverness Thistle to form: Caledonian Thistle – shortly afterwards renamed Inverness Caledonian Thistle
- Ground: Telford Street Park
- Colours: Royal blue shirts, white shorts, royal blue socks

== Honours ==
- Highland Football League – 1895/96, 1898/99, 1899/1900, 1901/02, 1910/11, 1913/14, 1925/26, 1930/31, 1950/51, 1951/52, 1963/64, 1970/71, 1976/77, 1977/78, 1981/82, 1982/83, 1983/84, 1987/88
- Scottish Qualifying Cup (North) – 1948/49, 1949/50, 1950/51, 1961/62, 1966/67, 1969/70, 1971/72, 1981/82, 1982/83, 1983/84, 1986/87, 1987/88, 1991/92
- North of Scotland Cup – 1889/90, 1891/92, 1896/97, 1901/02, 1910/11, 1911/12, 1921/22, 1924/25, 1925/26, 1927/28, 1933/34, 1950/51, 1951/52, 1973/74, 1974/75, 1976/77, 1981/82, 1983/84, 1985/86, 1993/94
- Highland League Cup – 1951/52, 1968/69, 1970/71, 1975/76, 1976/77
- Bells Cup – 1974/75, 1975/76, 1978/79
- Inverness Cup – 1895/96, 1896/97, 1898/99, 1899/1900, 1901/02, 1907/08, 1910/11, 1911/12, 1912/13, 1913/14, 1920/21, 1922/23, 1925/26, 1963/64, 1977/78, 1982/83, 1984/85, 1986/87, 1988/89

== Reserve honours ==
- North of Scotland Junior/2nd XI Cup – 1892–93, 1894–95, 1895–96, 1899–1900, 1904–05, 1906–07, 1921–22, 1947–48, 1948–49, 1954–55, 1959–60, 1965–66, 1970–71, 1988–89, 1990–91
- North Caledonian Football League – 1948–49, 1951–52, 1952–53, 1969–70
