= North of Scotland Cup =

- Founded: 1888
- Region: North of Scotland FA
- Current champions: Forres Mechanics (9th title)
- Most championships: Clachnacuddin (22 titles)

The North of Scotland Cup is a knock-out tournament for football teams in membership of the North of Scotland Football Association. The teams involved are based in the Highlands and Moray and membership consists of senior clubs from the Scottish Professional Football League (SPFL), Highland Football League and North Caledonian League.

== Winners ==
Season	Winner
1888–89	Crown
1889–90	Caledonian
1890–91	Cameron Highlanders
1891–92	Caledonian
1892–93	Inverness Thistle
1893–94	Inverness Thistle
1894–95	Clachnacuddin
1895–96	Clachnacuddin
1896–97	Caledonian
1897–98	Clachnacuddin
1898–99	Elgin City
1899–1900	Clachnacuddin
1900–01	Inverness Citadel
1901–02	Caledonian
1902–03	Clachnacuddin
1903–04	Clachnacuddin
1904–05	Inverness Citadel
1905–06	Clachnacuddin
1906–07	Clachnacuddin
1907–08	Forres Mechanics
1908–09	Inverness Citadel
1909–10	Inverness Citadel
1910–11	Caledonian
1911–12	Caledonian
1912–13	Inverness Thistle
1913–14	Caledonian
1914–15	No Competition due to First World War
1915–16	No Competition due to First World War
1916–17	No Competition due to First World War
1917–18	No Competition due to First World War
1918–19	No Competition due to First World War
1919–20	Clachnacuddin
1920–21	Clachnacuddin
1921–22	Caledonian
1922–23	Clachnacuddin
1923–24	Elgin City
1924–25	Caledonian
1925–26	Caledonian
1926–27	Forres Mechanics
1927–28	Caledonian
1928–29	Inverness Citadel
1929–30	Ross County
1930–31	Inverness Thistle
1931–32	Inverness Citadel
1932–33	Inverness Citadel
1933–34	Caledonian
1934–35	Inverness Thistle
1935–36	Forres Mechanics
1936–37	Elgin City
1937–38	Clachnacuddin
1938–39	Inverness Thistle
1939–40	Clachnacuddin
1940–41	No Competition due to Second World War
1941–42	No Competition due to Second World War
1942–43	No Competition due to Second World War
1943–44	No Competition due to Second World War
1944–45	No Competition due to Second World War
1945–46	Inverness Thistle
1946–47	Clachnacuddin
1947–48	Clachnacuddin
1948–49	Clachnacuddin
1949–50	Clachnacuddin
1950–51	Caledonian
1951–52	Caledonian
1952–53	Inverness Thistle
1953–54	Clachnacuddin
1954–55	Elgin City
1955–56	Elgin City
1956–57	Nairn County
1957–58	Forres Mechanics
1958–59	Rothes
1959–60	Inverness Thistle
1960–61	Elgin City
1961–62	Elgin City
1962–63	Nairn County
1963–64	Nairn County
1964–65	Clachnacuddin
1965–66	Nairn County
1966–67	Forres Mechanics
1967–68	Elgin City
1968–69	Elgin City
1969–70	Ross County
1970–71	Elgin City
1971–72	Ross County
1972–73	Elgin City
1973–74	Caledonian
1974–75	Caledonian
1975–76	Elgin City
1976–77	Caledonian
1977–78	Inverness Thistle
1978–79	Rothes
1979–80	Clachnacuddin
1980–81	Brora Rangers
1981–82	Inverness Thistle
1982–83	Elgin City
1983–84	Caledonian
1984–85	Inverness Thistle
1985–86	Caledonian
1986–87	Forres Mechanics
1987–88	Inverness Thistle
1988–89	Elgin City
1989–90	Elgin City
1990–91	Brora Rangers
1991–92	Ross County
1992–93	Clachnacuddin
1993–94	Caledonian
1994–95	Lossiemouth
1995–96	Lossiemouth
1996–97	Lossiemouth
1997–98	Elgin City
1998–99	Elgin City
1999–2000	Inverness Caledonian Thistle
2000–01	Lossiemouth
2001–02	Clachnacuddin
2002–03	Lossiemouth
2003–04	Elgin City
2004–05	Forres Mechanics
2005–06	Nairn County
2006–07	Ross County
2007–08	Inverness Caledonian Thistle
2008–09	Nairn County
2009–10	Inverness Caledonian Thistle
2010–11	Forres Mechanics
2011–12	Inverness Caledonian Thistle
2012–13	Nairn County
2013–14	Brora Rangers
2014–15	Brora Rangers
2015–16	Wick Academy
2016–17	Brora Rangers
2017–18	Brora Rangers
2018–19	Ross County
2019–20	Brora Rangers
2020–21	No Competition due to Coronavirus Pandemic
2021–22	Rothes
2022–23	Brora Rangers
2023–24	Nairn County
2024–25	Brora Rangers
2025–26	Forres Mechanics

== Club performance ==
Club	Winners	Winning years
Clachnacuddin	22	1894–95, 1895–96, 1897–98, 1899–1900, 1902–03, 1903–04, 1905–06, 1906–07, 1919–20, 1920–21, 1922–23, 1937–38, 1939–40, 1946–47, 1947–48, 1948–49, 1949–50, 1953–54, 1964–65, 1979–80, 1992–93, 2001–02
Caledonian	20	1889–90, 1891–92, 1896–97, 1901–02, 1910–11, 1911–12, 1913–14, 1921–22, 1924–25, 1925–26, 1927–28, 1933–34, 1950–51, 1951–52, 1973–74, 1974–75, 1976–77, 1983–84, 1985–86, 1993–94
Elgin City	18	1898–99, 1923–24, 1936–37, 1954–55, 1955–56, 1960–61, 1961–62, 1967–68, 1968–69, 1970–71, 1972–73, 1975–76, 1982–83, 1988–89, 1989–90, 1997–98, 1998–99, 2003–04
Inverness Thistle	13	1892–93, 1893–94, 1912–13, 1930–31, 1934–35, 1938–39, 1945–46, 1952–53, 1959–60, 1977–78, 1981–82, 1984–85, 1987–88
Brora Rangers	9	1980–81, 1990–91, 2013–14, 2014–15, 2016–17, 2017–18, 2019–20, 2022–23, 2024–25
Forres Mechanics	9	1907–08, 1926–27, 1935–36, 1957–58, 1966–67, 1986–87, 2004–05, 2010–11, 2025–26
Nairn County	8	1956–57, 1962–63, 1963–64, 1965–66, 2005–06, 2008–09, 2012–13, 2023–24
Inverness Citadel	7	1900–01, 1904–05, 1908–09, 1909–10, 1928–29, 1931–32, 1932–33
Ross County	6	1929–30, 1969–70, 1971–72, 1991–92, 2006–07, 2018–19
Lossiemouth	5	1994–95, 1995–96, 1996–97, 2000–01, 2002–03
Inverness Caledonian Thistle	4	1999–2000, 2007–08, 2009–10, 2011–12
Rothes	3	1958–59, 1978–79, 2021–22
Cameron Highlanders	1	1890–91
Crown	1	1888–89
Wick Academy	1	2015–16
