= Harmsworth Park =

Football ground in Wick, Scotland

Coordinates: 58°25′57″N 3°5′34″W

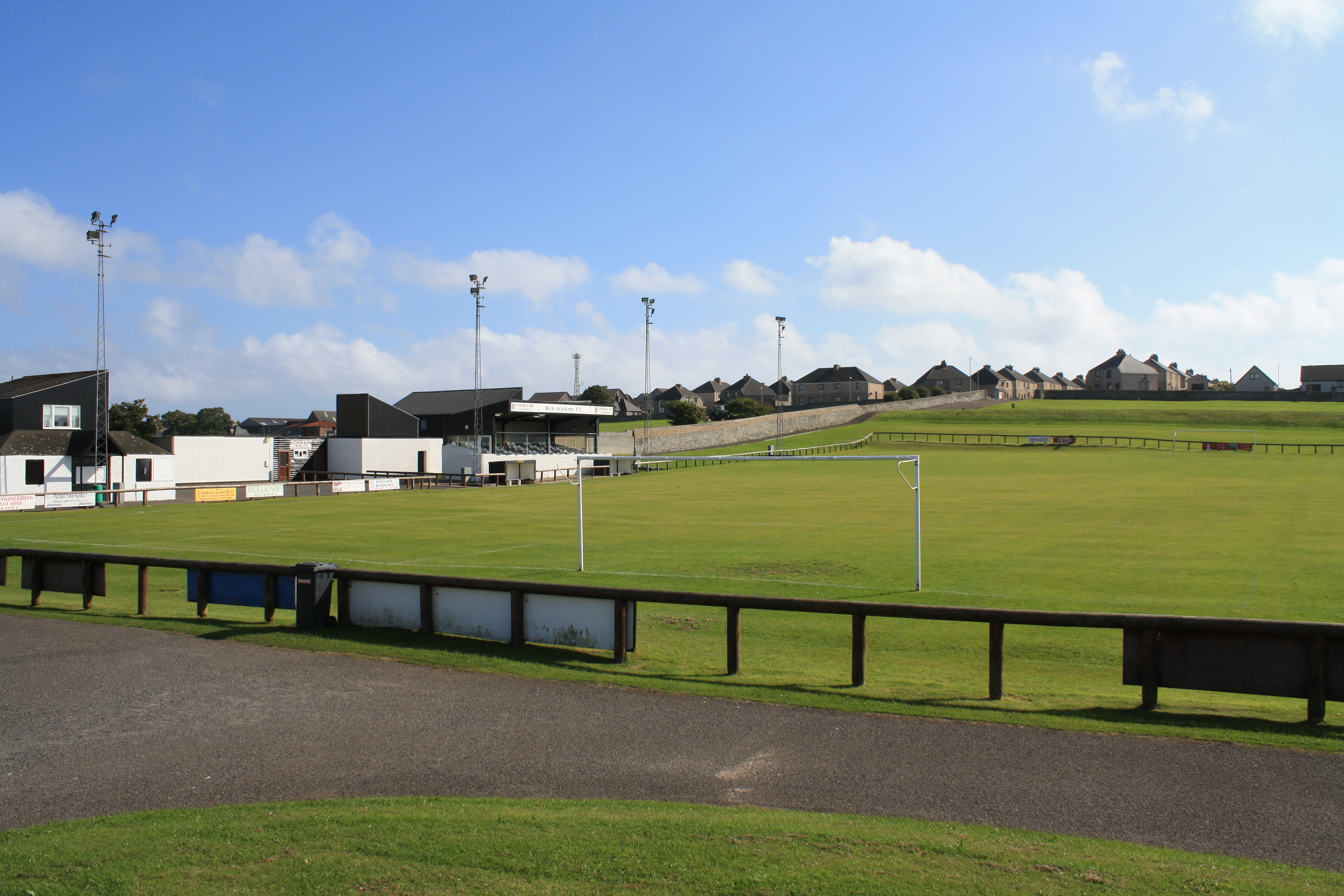

- Location within Caithness
- Former names: Harrow Park
- Location: South Road, Wick, Caithness, Scotland
- Owner: The people of Wick
- Capacity: 2,412 (102 seated)
- Surface: Grass
- Record attendance: 2,400 v Heart of Midlothian; 30 July 1984
- Field size: 106 x 74 yards

Tenant
- Wick Academy F.C.

Harmsworth Park is a football ground in Wick in the Scottish Highlands of Scotland, which is the home ground of Highland Football League side Wick Academy F.C. It is located on South Road in the south of the town and has a capacity of 2,412 with 102 seated. The ground is the home of the most northerly senior football club in the United Kingdom.

== History ==
The ground was previously known as Harrow Park before 1920, and was the ground of the town's first senior football club, Wick Rovers. It was bought and given as a gift to the town of Wick by a businessman, Leicester Harmsworth, as a recreation park. Maintenance of the ground was primarily seen to by local football clubs who were responsible for building a perimeter wall. A pavilion was erected in 1925 and the changing rooms were saved from demolition in 1973 following the club's promise to keep it in a good state of repair.

Wick Academy's record attendance at Harmsworth Park came in July 1984 when 2,400 spectators watched the club take on Heart of Midlothian of Edinburgh in a friendly match. The home side lost 7–1. Ten years later the club was admitted to the Highland Football League, joining in 1994 after several rejected applications in previous years, following the departure of Caledonian, Inverness Thistle and Ross County football clubs to the Scottish Football League. The club's first game in the Highland League at Harmsworth Park was against Cove Rangers and drew a crowd of 1,700 spectators.

At the end of the 2010-11 season Harmsworth Park was renovated in order to obtain an Entry Level National Club Licence in order to continue to compete in the Highland League and other competitions such as the Scottish Cup and Scottish Challenge Cup, following a review from the Scottish Football Association the ground fell short on three categories in order to obtain the licence, which were: a stadium certificate, floodlights and first aid facilities. With the aid of a grant from the Scottish Football Partnership the club was therefore able to fulfil these criteria.

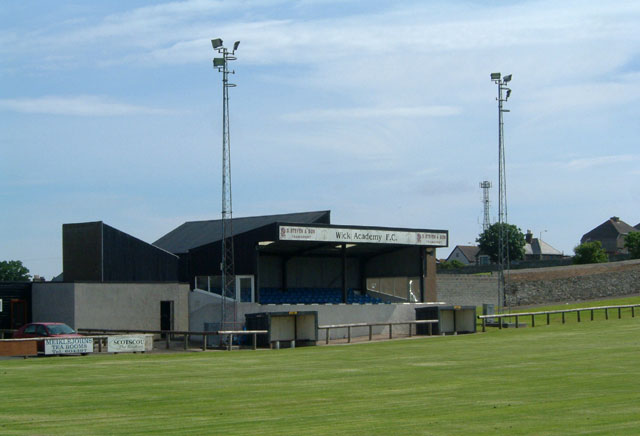
The main stand in 2005

== Structure and facilities ==
The ground has one seated stand and a covered enclosure,. New black and white seats were added to the main stand, replacing the old blue seats which had come from Ibrox Stadium in Glasgow when it was last renovated. The floodlights that came from Inverness Thistle's Kingsmills ground were replaced to a higher standard during the ground's renovation in 2011, along with a new medical facility for first-aid treatment. During the SFA review the stands were also passed as structurally sound.

== Transport ==
The nearest railway station to the ground is Wick railway station which is located half a mile north of Harmsworth Park, roughly a 10-minute walk. The station is located on the Far North Line which runs from Inverness railway station and terminates at Wick.

On the south approach road to the town along the A99, Harmsworth Park is located on the right upon entering Wick.
