= Fort William F.C. =

Association football club in Scotland

Fort William
- Full name: Fort William Football Club
- Nickname: The Fort
- Founded: 1974
- Ground: Claggan Park, Fort William
- Capacity: 1,800 (200 Seated)
- Coordinates: 56°49′19″N 5°4′54″W
- Chairman: Robert Coull
- Manager: Kyle Redpath
- League: North Caledonian League
- 2025–26: North Caledonian League, 6th of 12
Home colours	Away colours

Fort William Football Club is a senior football team from Fort William, Lochaber, Scotland. They play in the North Caledonian Football League, having been relegated from the Highland Football League in 2022 after 37 seasons.

== History ==
=== Origins and the early years ===
The club was founded in 1974 by then chairman Colin Neilson and started out playing mainly friendlies and cup competitions, such as the Scottish Qualifying Cup, the North of Scotland Cup and the Inverness Cup.

In 1980, their most famous player to date, John McGinlay made his senior debut for Fort William at the age of 16, coming on as a substitute in a North of Scotland Cup tie with now Scottish Professional Football League side Elgin City (formerly of the Highland League). At the age of 17, he moved to Nairn County, and would later go on to play in the Premier League with Bolton Wanderers and eventually represent Scotland. He was childhood friends with another, now former, professional footballer Duncan Shearer, who also hailed from Fort William.

Ever since forming in 1974, the club campaigned for entry into the Highland League, but were rejected many times. In 1983, Fort William were admitted to the North Caledonian League. The club enjoyed wins in the two-year spell in the North Caledonian League. They won both the Chic Allan Cup and Morris Newton / SWL Cup in successive seasons, while also winning the Football Times Cup and finishing as runners-up in the league in the 1983–84 season.

In the 1984–85 season, the club won the division outright, making it their only league championship victory to date.

In the 1985–86 season, the club was admitted to the Highland League. Fort William played their first Highland League match against their nearest league team Clachnacuddin, with striker Gordon MacIntyre scoring the goal in a 1–0 home win. In that season, they recorded their highest-ever attendance of 1,500, against the Scottish Football League side Stirling Albion in the Scottish Cup 2nd round, with a 0–0 draw, before losing 6–0 in the replay at Annfield a week later.

=== Recent times ===
The club was unable to build upon their relatively competitive start to life in the Highland League, and gradually, season-by-season, began to struggle to the point where they had finished bottom in 14 of the 18 seasons between 1996–97 and 2013–14. Their struggles included a record 17–0 away defeat in 1998, to now Scottish League One side Peterhead. Despite this, The Fort did not finish bottom that season, with the wooden spoon going to Nairn County. In the 2008–09 season, they accumulated only a solitary point from 28 matches, making it the Highland League's record lowest points total since its inception.

During the 2008–09 season, an exciting future appeared forthcoming, when television producer and former Lochaber resident, Paul MacDonald, unveiled his vision for the football team. In conjunction with his American Entertainment company, PMAC Tonight, he planned to create a reality TV series focusing on the toiling team. The premise was to import some of the best young American talent from college campuses across the USA, in an attempt to take Fort William "From Worst to First", in what was envisaged to be the ultimate underdog story. However, after much initial media hype, the project failed to materialise.

The club formerly fielded a reserve side in the North Caledonian Football League, but were forced to disband this team prior to the 2011–12 season due to a lack of playable pitches in the Fort William area – something that has always plagued the club. They were, however, able to set up an Under 19s team, which was formed with the sole purpose of participating in the Scottish Youth Cup.

In January 2015, the club made history when it recorded four consecutive league victories for the first time since joining the Highland League, after a 2–1 success over Clachnacuddin.

The club's continuing presence in the Highland League was threatened in early 2018 as all six directors announced they would be stepping down at the end of the season. However, despite a poor season (picking up just five points and conceding over 180 goals), it was announced that Fort William would continue its involvement for the 2018–19 season.

Five games into the 2018–19 season and still pointless, the club was deducted nine points by the Highland League after fielding an ineligible player on three occasions. They finished the season with no wins and two draws from their 34 games, ending on −7 points. This led to them being dubbed in 2019 "The worst football team in Britain", by many news media publishers.

In July 2019, Scottish Championship club Inverness Caledonian Thistle loaned nine players to Fort William to both prepare the youngsters for professional football and bolster the Fort William squad.

On 31 July 2019, Fort William won their first competitive match in 707 days when they defeated Nairn County 5–2 in a North of Scotland Cup tie, ending a 69-game run without a victory. This win came one day after BBC Scotland broadcast The Fort, a documentary on the club's winless run. After another winless month, Fort William finally recorded their first league win in 882 days on 11 September, with a 1–0 home win against Clachnacuddin.

In the 2021–22 season, Fort William finished bottom of the table and were relegated to the North Caledonian League after forfeiting their play-off match against North Superleague side Banks O' Dee F.C.

"Fort William became the first team to be relegated from the Highland League last season and were unable to play in the play-off final after being unable to raise a team." — Strathspey Herald (January 2023)

In November 2024, it was announced that the SFA had rejected Fort William's re-application for an entry level SFA Licence, leaving the club ineligible for promotion back into the Highland League and ineligible to compete in the Scottish Cup unless they win the North Caledonian League.

== Current squad ==
As of 23 September 2022

Note: Flags indicate national team as defined under FIFA eligibility rules; some limited exceptions apply. Players may hold more than one non-FIFA nationality.

No.	Pos.	Nation	Player
—	GK	ALB	Elgi Fejzo
—	GK	POL	Mateusz Kulbacki
—	DF	SCO	John Ferguson
—	DF	SCO	Andrew Martin
—	DF	NIR	Michael Rodgers
—	DF	FRA	Niels Lellouch
—	DF	ENG	Cameron Duxbury
—	DF	SCO	John Treasurer
—	DF	SCO	Steven Campbell
—	DF	ENG	Lamar Moore
—	MF	CAN	Diego Lazaro
—	MF	SCO	Andrew Mclean
—	MF	SCO	Martin Munro

No.	Pos.	Nation	Player
—	MF	ENG	Asad Ahmed
—	MF	SCO	Michael Gillespie
—	MF	SCO	Aidan Taylor
—	MF	ALG	Amin Benyoucef
—	MF	IRL	Lerlah Hay
—	MF	ENG	Carsel Hylton
—	MF	SCO	Sean Noble
—	MF	SCO	Dave Forbes
—	MF	ENG	Taylor Kelly
—	FW	SCO	Logan Barker
—	FW	SCO	Iain MacLellan
—	FW	WAL	Shaquille Wynter-Coles

== Honours ==
- North Caledonian League
  - Champions: 1984–85
- Football Times Cup
  - Winners: 1983–84
- Chic Allan Cup
  - Winners: 1983–84, 1984–85
- Morris Newton / SWL Cup
  - Winners: 1983–84, 1984–85

== League positions ==
All final positions are from the Highland League.

Season	Final position	Points Total
1985–86	12/17	35
1986–87	11/18	33
1987–88	17/18	21
1988–89	18/18	13
1989–90	13/18	40
1990–91	12/18	43
1991–92	16/18	28
1992–93	16/18	19
1993–94	16/18	27
1994–95	12/16	37
1995–96	14/16	26
1996–97	16/16	9
1997–98	15/16	13
1998–99	16/16	4
1999–00	16/16	8
2000–01	14/14	14
2001–02	13/15	23
2002–03	15/15	13
2003–04	15/15	13
2004–05	13/15	16
2005–06	15/15	4
2006–07	15/15	9
2007–08	15/15	3
2008–09	15/15	1
2009–10	17/18	20
2010–11	18/18	9
2011–12	18/18	7
2012–13	18/18	6
2013–14	18/18	9
2014–15	13/18	27
2015–16	17/18	16
2016–17	17/18	11
2017–18	18/18	5
2018–19	18/18	−7
2019–20	16/17	10
2020–21	15/16	0
2021–22	18/18	7

== Claggan Park ==
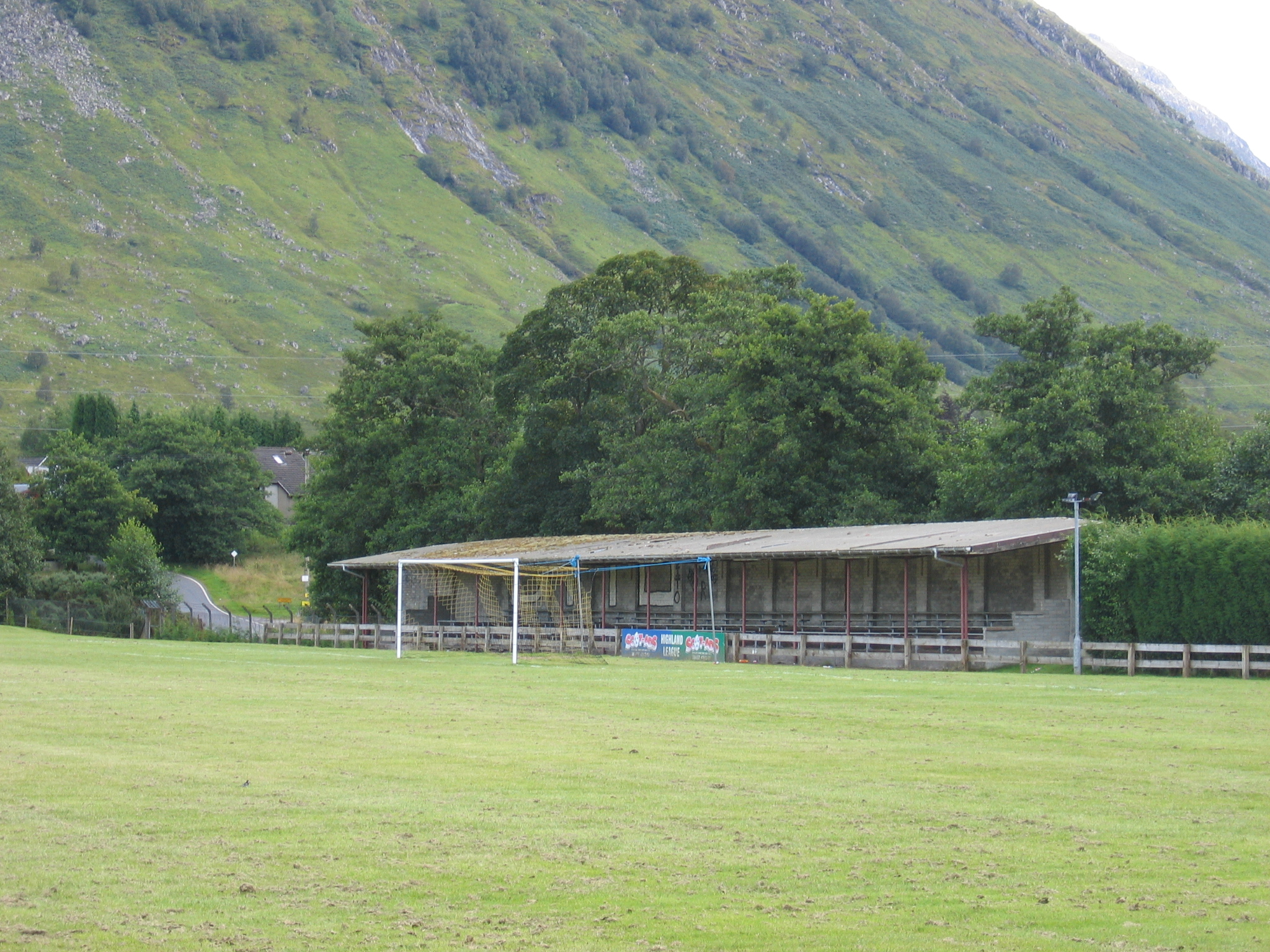
The stand at Claggan Park.

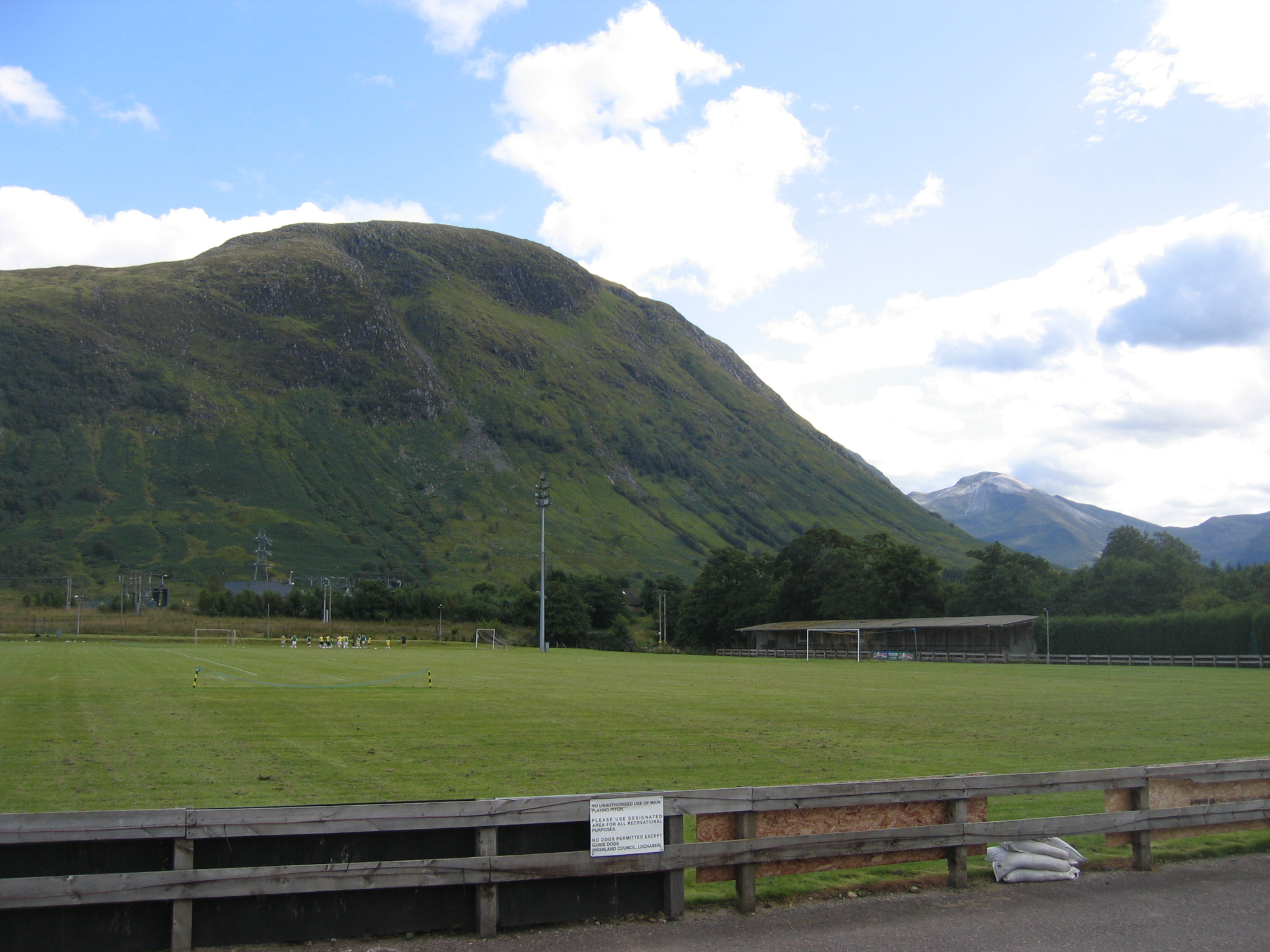
Fort William F.C. play at Claggan Park in the foothills of Ben Nevis.

Their ground, Claggan Park, has a capacity of 1,800 – and is sometimes regarded as one of the most picturesque grounds in the United Kingdom, mainly due to the views of the nearby Ben Nevis mountain range.

Claggan Park consists of standing areas on all sides of the pitch, with one 'rustic' stand that can seat 200 spectators. To date, the record attendance is 1,500 – recorded in a 1985 Scottish Cup 2nd round tie against Scottish League side Stirling Albion.

Often during the autumn and winter months, many home matches are postponed (usually due to a waterlogged pitch) – a consequence of the heavy rainfall the town experiences.
