= Wick Academy F.C. =

Association football club in Scotland

Wick Academy
- Full name: Wick Academy Football Club
- Nickname: The Scorries
- Founded: October 1893; 133 years ago
- Ground: Harmsworth Park, Wick
- Capacity: 2,412 (150 seated)
- Coordinates: 58.432885°N 3.093342°W
- Chairman: Alan Farquhar
- Manager: Ewan McElroy
- League: Highland League
- 2025–26: Highland League, 16th of 18
Home colours	Away colours

Wick Academy Football Club are a senior football club founded in October 1893, who currently play in the Highland League at Harmsworth Park. They represent the Caithness town of Wick, making them the most northerly professional football league club in the United Kingdom.

== History ==
The club was known in Wick simply as Academy and sometimes in other parts of Caithness as Pulteneytown Academy. An indirect and unofficial connection with the local school of the same name was maintained with the election of a teacher, John Davidson as the first captain or 'leader' as it was termed in the minute book of the first meeting. The club's first game was a friendly away to Castletown. Home games were played at Harrow Park, now known as Harmsworth Park. Ten matches, with only two defeats, were played in that first season against teams like Dunbeath, John O'Groats (formed that same year in Wick), Lybster Portland, Thurso Thistle and Wick Thistle.

The Wick League was started in 1896, and Academy won the championship in the third season in 1898–99, the first of 17 league titles. From 1907 to 1914, Academy had virtually a clean sweep of league and local cups and in 1911, applied successfully for full membership of the SFA, so they could play in the Qualifying Cup.

Academy's Qualifying Cup début was a home tie on 2 September 1911, and a crowd of about 800 saw a 4–0 win against Inverness Thistle. Men paid 6d, boys 3d, ladies were admitted free and gate receipts were £17. Caledonian won a 2nd round tie in Wick 4–1.

The right winger in those games was Jimmy Miller, who was later secretary and president of the club, his commitment to the club continued almost 50 years to 1954.

A Caithness County League was started in the 1926–27 season, by which time the Harmsworth family had bought the park and donated it to the town with the Burgh Council as trustees and local sports clubs formed a management committee. Only the football clubs seemed prepared to do the work of the ground improvements and building a stone wall to enclose the park. Changing rooms were built and were saved from demolition in 1973, when Academy agreed to keep them in a good state of repair. The building now houses an office and tea hut. Academy won the county league in 1927–28 and again in 1928–29, 1930–31, 1935–36 and 1937–38.

As the only SFA club in Caithness (Thurso Pentland were also members for three years from 1936), Academy was allowed to sign players from other clubs to play in Qualifying Cup games. From 1928 onwards, they were unbeaten at home in Qualifying Cup ties. In 1933, they beat Nairn County, Caley and Keith, all away, to reach the Scottish Cup proper, losing 3–0 to a strong Division Two side, St Bernard's on 20 January 1934 at the Gymnasium Ground in Edinburgh. In 1936, Academy drew 3–3 in Wick with local rivals Brora Rangers, won the replay and two more games at Forres Mechanics and Buckie Thistle to earn a tie at Stirling. Academy scored first against King's Park, but lost 6–1. Several prestigious friendlies were played, Aberdeen and Celtic were among the teams who appeared at Harmsworth Park in the 1930s.

Academy had also joined the North of Scotland FA in 1914, but had been unable to play their first tie away to Forres Mechanics as most of their players had been called up by the Territorials. They had to wait until 1954 to be readmitted, but made up for lost time with a 4–3 win at Brora Rangers, before losing 3–1 in the semi-final away to Caldeonian.

In 1960, the Caithness Amateur Football Association switched to summer football and to retain its SFA membership, Wick Academy had to stay with the normal winter season, playing only cup ties and friendlies for the next 12 years.

In 1972, with Clair Harper now as chairman, the club joined the North of Scotland 2nd XI Association to have regular league fixtures, drawing 2–2 at home to Dingwall Thistle in the first game. Academy were a strong team in this North Reserve League, (later to become the North Caledonian Football League) and were champions four seasons running from 1978 to 1979 to 1981–82 under manager John MacDonald, and also won several of the league cups. With former goalkeeper Pat Miller as manager, Academy won the league again in 86–7. In July 1984, Heart of Midlothian fielded a full strength first team in a friendly which attracted 2,400 fans to Harmsworth Park. 900 copies of a souvenir programme sold out five minutes before kick off. Richard Hughes scored for Academy in a 7–1 defeat.

After having several applications knocked back, Academy were at last voted into the HFL in 1994 when Caledonian and Inverness Thistle amalgamated and left to join the SFL, along with Ross County. The first game at home to Cove Rangers drew a crowd of 1,700, but ended with a 3–0 defeat. After a draw with Rothes, Academy beat the then league leaders Forres Mechanics 1–0, and after three straight wins in October, were briefly fourth in the table.

In the 2001–02 Qualifying Cup, wins over Lossiemouth and Nairn County saw Academy in the Scottish Cup proper and BBC TV cameras were at Harmsworth Park where, Threave Rovers won 3–2.

Midfielder Martin Gunn represented Scotland in the Four Nations semi-professional tournaments in May 2005 and May 2006.

In January 2007, the club appointed Richard Hughes and Ian Munro as first team joint managers after Peter Budge resigned to join the SFA as football development officer at the Highland Football Academy. Hughes and Munro have long been associated with the Caithness side. After finishing usually between 10th and 13th, Academy completed a run of ten successive league wins in the 2008–09 season to finish fifth. Co-managers Richard Hughes and Ian Munro received the league's Manager of the Year Award, with Richard Macadie voted Player of the Year.

In the 2009–10 season, wins over Clachnacuddin and Girvan put the team in the third round of the Scottish Cup for the first time, earning a home tie with Second Division side Brechin City. Academy almost pulled off a shock, but an equaliser for Brechin five-minutes from full-time saw the game finish 4–4. Brechin won the replay at Glebe Park 4–2. Academy finished the season in ninth position and midfielder Sam Mackay was voted the Sunday Post Young Player of the year.

The 2010–11 season saw the Scorries under-achieve in the league with a disappointing 14th-place finish, but the Club reached their first senior Cup final in September 2011. Academy beat Brora Rangers and Thurso to reach the North of Scotland Cup where Wick produced a magnificent performance in beating a strong Inverness Caledonian Thistle side 3–1. This set up a final against the current cup holders Forres Mechanics. The final was played in Brora at Dudgeon Park and Academy took over 1,000 supporters over the Ord where they created a sea of black and white inside the ground. Unfortunately Academy had a poor first half and went into the break trailing by three goals to zero. A battling performance in the second half saw the score pegged back to 3–2, but as Academy pushed for an equaliser the clock ran out and Wick hearts were broken.

It was a similar story in the Scottish Cup in season 2010–11. After a first round bye, the club drew Whitehill Welfare in the second round away at Ferguson Park in Rosewell. Academy travelled as far as Perth the day before the game and woke up on the Saturday morning to the news that the game was postponed due to a water-logged pitch, so had to turn tail and head for home without a boot being dirtied. The return trip the following weekend also ended in disappointment. The sides went in at half-time with the spoils shared at a goal each, but Whitehill scored three-second half goals in a five-minute spree that put them in a commanding 4–1 lead. Academy however fought back and pulled the score back to 4–3 but again the sands of time ran out and Whitehill went on to face Montrose in the third round while Academy headed back up the A9 for another marathon trek home.

At the end of season 2010–11 co-managers Tichie Hughes and Zeeky Munro announced their resignation and the hunt began for a new manager. Former East Fife, Rangers, Hearts, Airdrieonians and Raith Rovers player Davie Kirkwood was appointed into the hot-seat. Davie who had previously worked as head of youth with Raith Rovers, Rangers and Ross County duly appointed Tichie as his assistant and Gary Manson bolstered his back-room team as a player coach.

The Harmsworth Park also had a make-over during the 2010–11 closed-season. The club are striving to apply for a SFA National Club License for the start of 2012 and work necessary to take the park up to the required standard was completed. This included the upgrade of the floodlight, creation of a medical room and a successful safety inspection and associated "letter of compliance" from Highland Council. In additional both stands received a freshen up with bench seating installed against the south stand back wall, boarding was erected around the park perimeter fence, new goal posts were erected and a massive amount of work was done to the playing surface to take it into tip-top condition.

As a result of all the hard work the club was one of the first Scottish Highland League sides to be awarded a SFA National Club License in February 2012. As a result of obtaining Club licensing the top two licensed SHFL Clubs were invited into the first round of the Ramsdens Cup. Wick Academy along with Inverurie Locos secured the two slots and Academy drew a home tie against Raith Rovers. The Scorries gave the 1st Division side a real fright and at 2–2 it looked as if an upset was on the cards, but unfortunately Raith went on to win the game 4–2. Wick finished 8th in the league in the 2011–12 season

Pre-season 2012 saw the club draw 3–3 with Aberdeen and 0–0 with Inverness Caledonian Thistle.

At the end of August 2012 Manager Davie Kirkwood resigned to join local rivals Brora Rangers. Richard Hughes took over as caretaker manager but the shock resignation of Kirkwood was taken in the stride of the players as they did their talking on the park. As fate would have it Academy met Kirkwood's new team in the semi-final of the North of Scotland Cup within a few weeks of his sudden departure, and the Scorries thrashed Brora 3–0. Academy faced Nairn County in the final, which was played on 20 October 2012 but lost 2–1 with Nairn's winner coming in the first period of extra time after the game had ended 1–1.

In the Scottish Cup Academy became the first Highland League team in over 10 years to beat Cup specialists Spartans 2–0 down at Ainslie Park, and then drew another mammoth away trip to Berwick Rangers in the second round. Academy missed a penalty in that game and with the score at 0–0 in the 90th minute and a re-play on the cards Berwick were awarded a penalty of their own which they converted to win the game 1–0.

Barry Wilson was announced as the new manager on 14 October 2012 with caretaker manager Richard Hughes staying on as his assistant. Barry Wilson's first game in charge was a 5–1 demolition of Keith which took his new side to the top of the Highland League.

In November 2012 a new sponsorship deal was announced with Scotty Youngson of PHD\Barga Ltd. Scotty owns the Comm Bar in Thurso which will be used by the club as the main sponsorship logo until the end of season 2014–15. As well as the Comm Bar in Thurso Scotty also owns the Central Bar and Hotel, Top Joe's and Caffe Cardosi.

Academy ended the 2012–13 season with a 4–1 win over visitors Deveronvale and finished in third spot in the table, the highest league finish achieved to date for the club. Other records also tumbled as the Scorries went the whole of season 2012–13 with a 100% home league win record (17 wins from 17 games), and extended their unbeaten home league run to 29 games. Fraserburgh being the last team to win a league game at the Harmsworth Park back in October 2011. 2012–13 also saw the Scorries score over 100 league goals in a single season, and keep the most number of clean sheets – 12 in total. Their best previous clean sheet total in a single season was six.

Barry Wilson left the Club in January 2014 to take up the Managers post at Elgin City following the departure of Ross Jack. Gordon Connelly was appointed as the new Manager with Richard Hughes staying as his Assistant Manager. At the same time Wick Academy also appointed Ross Suttar as the Club Development Officer and first team coach.

At the beginning of the 2014–15 Highland League season, Wick Academy introduced a new club mascot named 'Norrie The Scorrie' to Harmsworth Park. The Club reached the semi-final of the North of Scotland Cup where they were beaten 2–1 at Harmsworth Park by local rivals Brora Rangers in an evenly contested game. However, in the Scottish Cup Wick were defeated in the first round away at Huntly. In the Highland League Cup, Academy beat Fraserburgh, Clachnacuddin, and Nairn County to reach the final. The final was played at Grant Street Park Inverness and Academy lost 4–0 to Cove Rangers. In the league season, the club would finish in fourth place, 22 points behind first-placed Brora Rangers.

2015–16 was arguably one of Academy's best seasons when in November 2015 the club won its first piece of silverware since joining the SHFL defeating Nairn County 6–2 in the final of the Menzies Distribution North of Scotland Cup. The club also got to the 3rd round of the Scottish Cup. All three games went to replays with Academy beating Whitehill Welfare and Nairn County before being knocked out by Linlithgow Rose. League form was also good and a 5th-place finish was secured following a great run-in finishing with a 4–0 win against Fraserburgh down in Bellslea in the last game of the season.

In 2016 Academy beat Dalbeattie Star and then Whitehill Welfare to reach the 3rd round of the Scottish Cup. Unfortunately, they lost 2–0 to Stirling Albion at Forthbank Stadium, thus ending the Cup run for another year.

2017–18 was a somewhat disappointing season for Academy. A poor start to the League campaign was compounded with a first-round penalty shoot-out defeat in the North of Scotland Cup at the hands of Invergordon. Gordon Connelly stood down as Manager in August 2017 and he was replaced by Tom McKenna. The Scorries bowed out of the Scottish Cup in the first-round. They drew 2–2 with the University of Stirling in the first round at Harmsworth Park, but lost 1–0 in the replay at Falkirk Stadium. A first-round exit in the Highland League Cup followed as Nairn Country ran out comprehensive 4–0 winners at Harmsworth Park. League form did however pick up including a run of 16 games with only one defeat. Wick finished the season with a League position of 12th.

== Managers since 1994 ==
The Wick Academy FC Managers since the club joined the SHFL in season 1994–95 are as follows:

Manager	Nat	From	To	Competitive Record							
Manager	Nat	From	To	G	W	D	L	GF	GA	GD	Win %
John MacDonald & Patty Miller	(Scotland)	8 August 1994	6 May 1995	36	7	4	25	36	97	−61	19.44
Don Cowie	(Scotland)	25 July 1995	21 February 1998	100	28	21	51	137	208	−71	28.00
John Black	(Scotland)	14 March 1998	31 October 1998	25	5	7	13	26	53	−27	20.00
Peter Budge	(Scotland)	21 November 1998	15 July 2000	59	9	8	42	64	160	−96	15.25
Ian Munro	(Scotland)	5 August 2000	12 August 2000	2	1	0	1	2	2	+0	50.00
Patty Miller	(Scotland)	12 August 2000	18 January 2003	82	17	12	53	97	175	−78	20.73
Alistair Budge	(Scotland)	25 January 2003	8 April 2006	111	29	13	69	151	266	−115	26.13
Ian Munro & Richard Hughes	(Scotland)	29 April 2006	13 May 2006	2	1	0	1	3	6	−3	50.00
Peter Budge	(Scotland)	6 July 2006	20 January 2007	21	6	2	13	32	52	−20	28.57
Ian Munro & Richard Hughes	(Scotland)	7 January 2007	28 May 2011	168	72	24	72	347	341	+6	42.86
Davie Kirkwood	(Scotland)	26 July 2011	31 August 2012	45	22	8	15	111	77	+34	48.89
Richard Hughes	(Scotland)	1 September 2012	29 October 2012	9	6	1	2	26	12	+14	66.67
Barry Wilson	(Scotland)	30 October 2012	28 January 2014	52	32	4	16	154	77	+77	61.54
Gordon Connelly	(Scotland)	29 January 2014	25 August 2017	147	73	29	45	325	216	+109	49.66
Tom McKenna	(Scotland)	17 September 2017	14 February 2020	96	37	20	39	172	164	+8	38.54
Gary Manson	(Scotland)	10 July 2020	Present	192	50	32	110	254	454	−200	26.04

Updated 28 Jul 2026

== Managerial achievements ==
Scottish Highland League Manager of the Year

- Richard Hughes & Ian Munro 2008–09

== Player achievements ==
Sunday Post Young Player of the Year Winner

- Sam MacKay 2008–09, 2009–10

Sunday Post Young Player of the Year Runner-up

- David Allan 2009–10

Supporters' Player of the Year

- Gary Manson 2017–18
- Steven Anderson 2016–17
- David Allan 2015–16
- David Allan 2014–15
- Alan Farquhar 2013–14
- Alan Farquhar 2012–13
- Alan Farquhar 2011–12
- Richard Macadie 2010–11
- David Allan 2009–10
- Richard Macadie 2008–09

Players' Player of the Year

- Danny Mackay 2017–18
- Steven Anderson 2016–17
- Sam Mackay 2015–16
- Grant Campbell 2014–15
- Alan Farquhar 2013–14
- Stevie Cunningham and Craig Shearer 2012–13
- Davie Allan 2011–12
- Richard Macadie 2010–11

John Henderson Shield Young Player of the Year

- Danny McCarthy 2017–18
- Danny McCarthy 2016–17
- Marc MacGregor 2015–16
- Sean McCarthy 2014–15
- Grant Steven 2013–14
- Grant Steven 2012–13
- Grant Steven 2011–12
- Stevie Cunningham 2010–11
- Allan Farquhar 2009–10
- Richard Macadie & Bryan McKiddie 2008–09

Dot McLachlan Trophy Most Improved Player

- Korbyn Cameron 2017–18
- Danny McCarthy 2016–17
- Steven Anderson 2015–16
- Steven Anderson 2014–15
- Alan Hughes 2013–14
- James Pickles 2012–13
- Grant Steven 2011–12
- Bryan McKiddie 2010–11
- Alan Bokas 2009–10
- Stevie Cunningham 2008–09

Dan Thomson Trophy Youth Player of the Year

- Greg Mackay 2017–18
- Brandon Sinclair 2016–17
- Ryan Campbell 2015–16
- Ian Ross 2014–15
- Mark Webster 2013–14
- Ruri McCartney 2012–13
- Alan Hughes 2011–12
- Jack Halliday 2010–11
- James Mackay 2009–10
- Jordan McKechnie 2008–09

== Top goalscorers – Bill Mackay Memorial Golden Boot Award ==
Season	Player	League	Cup	Total
2017–18	Steven Anderson	14	0	14
2016–17	Steven Anderson	19	1	20
2016–17	Sam Mackay	18	2	20
2015–16	Steven Anderson	15	5	20
2015–16	Sam Mackay	12	8	20
2014–15	Richard Macadie	15	2	17
2013–14	Gary Weir	21	2	23
2012–13	Richard Macadie	24	3	27
2011–12	David Allan	21	3	24
2010–11	Richard Macadie	24	4	28
2009–10	David Allan	18	10	28
2008–09	Richard Macadie	14	2	16
2007–08	Gary Weir	13	3	16
2006–07	Shane Sutherland & Gary Weir	8	2	10
2005–06	Mark Nicol	9	0	9
2004–05	Martin Gunn	8	3	11
2003–04	Craig Gunn	22	3	25
2002–03	Martin Gunn	8	0	8
2001–02	Stewart Ross	4	3	7
2000–01	Gary Farquhar	9	0	9
1999–00	Stevie Reid	6	1	7
1998–99	Martin Gunn	8	2	10
1997–98	Gordon Connelly	10	5	15
1996–97	Alan Duff	10	0	10
1995–96	Alan Duff	17	1	19
1994–95	Alan Murray	19	0	19

Top Goal Scorer – All competitive games
#	Player	Total
1	Richard Macadie	193
2	Gary Weir	168
3	Davie Allan	142
4	Sam Mackay	136
5	Martin Gunn	77
6	Steven Anderson	67
6	Craig Shearer	67
8	Lukasz Geruzel	48
9	Gary Manson	45
10	Alan Murray	43

Updated 4 November 2018.

== Most appearances ==
Competitive, professional matches only including substitute appearances.

#	Name	Years	SHFL	Scottish Cup	NOS Cup	League Cup	Other	Total
1	(Scotland) Gary Manson	2000–present	507	27	42	20	17	613
2	(Scotland) Richard Macadie	2003–present	418	29	36	19	6	508
3	(Scotland) Craig Shearer	1998–2016	409	17	32	20	18	496
4	(Scotland) Gary Weir	2002–2017	361	21	34	20	9	445
5	(Scotland) Martin Gunn	1994–2012	360	9	33	19	17	438
6	(Scotland) Davie Allan	2008–present	273	22	21	12	1	329
7	(Scotland) Sam Mackay	2009–2020	253	21	20	13	1	308
8	(Scotland) Alan Farquhar	2009–present	240	22	23	11	1	297
9	(Scotland) Andrew MacLeod	2001–2011	248	10	19	10	9	296
10	(Scotland) Stevie Cunningham	2008–2014	206	15	19	7	2	249

Updated 4 November 2018. Other includes Scottish Qualifying Cup, SFA Challenge Cup and SFL Challenge Cup.

== League positions ==
Season	Division	Tier	Pos.	Pld.	W	D	L	GD	Pts	Scottish Cup	Other Comps/Honours
1911–12	N/A	N/A	Stats Unavailable							QC 2nd Round; Lost 4–1 to Caledonian	
1926–1972	Caithness County League	N/A	Stats Unavailable							N/A	Caithness County League; 1927–28, 1928–29, 1930–31, 1935–36, 1937–38
1933–34	Caithness County League	N/A	Stats Unavailable							First round; Lost 3–0 to St Bernard's	
1936–37	Caithness County League	N/A	Stats Unavailable							First round; Lost 6–1 to Stirling Albion	
1972–1994	North Reserve League	N/A	Stats Unavailable							N/A	North Reserve League; 1978–79, 1979–80, 1980–81, 1981–82, 1986–87
1994–95	Highland League	5	14th	30	7	4	19	−45	25	Information Unavailable	
1995–96	Highland League	5	10th	30	11	5	14	−21	38	Information Unavailable	
1996–97	Highland League	5	10th	30	9	8	13	−5	35	Information Unavailable	
1997–98	Highland League	5	13th	30	5	5	20	−34	20	Information Unavailable	
1998–99	Highland League	5	14th	30	7	2	21	−52	23	Information Unavailable	
1999–2000	Highland League	5	14th	30	6	5	19	−48	23	Information Unavailable	
2000–01	Highland League	5	10th	26	8	5	13	−4	29	Information Unavailable	
2001–02	Highland League	5	14th	28	5	4	19	−39	19	First round; Lost 3–2 to Threave Rovers	
2002–03	Highland League	5	13th	28	8	2	18	−35	26	Information Unavailable	
2003–04	Highland League	5	11th	28	6	5	17	−23	23	Information Unavailable	
2004–05	Highland League	5	12th	28	6	1	21	−41	19	Information Unavailable	
2005–06	Highland League	5	12th	28	7	4	17	−26	25	Information Unavailable	
2006–07	Highland League	5	11th	28	10	2	16	−17	32	Information Unavailable	
2007–08	Highland League	5	11th	28	9	5	14	−11	32	First round; Lost 5–0 to Deveronvale	
2008–09	Highland League	5	5th	28	16	3	9	+9	51	Second round replay; Lost 4–1 to Edinburgh City	
2009–10	Highland League	5	9th	34	16	6	12	+15	54	Third round replay; Lost 4–2 to Brechin City	
2010–11	Highland League	5	14th	34	12	3	19	−3	39	Second round; Lost 4–3 to Whitehill Welfare	
2011–12	Highland League	5	8th	34	16	7	11	+22	55	Second round; Lost 1–0 to Keith	
2012–13	Highland League	5	3rd	34	25	1	8	+53	76	Second round; Lost 1–0 to Berwick Rangers	Scottish Challenge Cup First Round; Lost 4–2 to Raith Rovers
2013–14	Highland League	5	8th	34	15	8	11	+32	53	Second round; Lost 4–2 to Turriff United	
2014–15	Highland League	5	4th	34	23	3	8	+51	72	First round; Lost 2–1 to Huntly	
2015–16	Highland League	5	5th	34	18	6	10	+34	60	Third round replay; Lost 5–1 to Linlithgow Rose	
2016–17	Highland League	5	8th	34	15	8	11	+23	53	Third round; Lost 2–0 to Stirling Albion	
2017–18	Highland League	5	12th	34	12	10	12	+13	46	First round replay; Lost 1–0 to Stirling University	
2018–19	Highland League	5	7th	34	15	7	12	+15	52	First round; Lost 2–1 to Auchinleck Talbot	
2019–20	Highland League	5	9th	25	9	5	11	−9	32	First round; Lost 3–2 to Inverurie Loco Works	League curtailed due to COVID-19 Pandemic, and was determined on a Points Per Game basis
2020–21	Highland League	5	14th	2	0	0	2	−5	0	First round; Lost 2–0 to Cowdenbeath	League curtailed due to COVID-19 Pandemic, and was determined on a Points Per Game basis
2021–22	Highland League	5	9th	34	10	9	15	−30	39	First round replay; Lost 4–1 to Bo'ness United	
2022–23	Highland League	5	16th	34	7	5	22	−66	26	Third round; Lost 6–0 to Falkirk	
2023–24	Highland League	5	12th	34	10	6	18	−21	36	First round; Lost 3–1 to Jeanfield Swifts	
2024–25	Highland League	5	14th	34	11	3	20	−30	36	First round; Drew 2-2, lost on penalties to Huntly	
2025–26	Highland League	5	16th	34	7	7	20	−23	28	Second round; Drew 1-1, lost on penalties to Benburb	
2026–27	Highland League	5	Ongoing								

== Honours ==
North of Scotland Cup:

- 2015–16

North Caledonian Football League:

- 1978–79, 1979–80, 1980–81, 1981–82, 1986–87

North Caledonian Cup:

- 1979–80, 1980–81, 1985–86

Football Times Cup:

- 1972–73, 1978–79

Chic Allan Memorial Cup:

- 1981–82, 1987–88

MacNicol Trophy:

- 1973–74
