= Mosset Park =

Football ground in Forres, Scotland

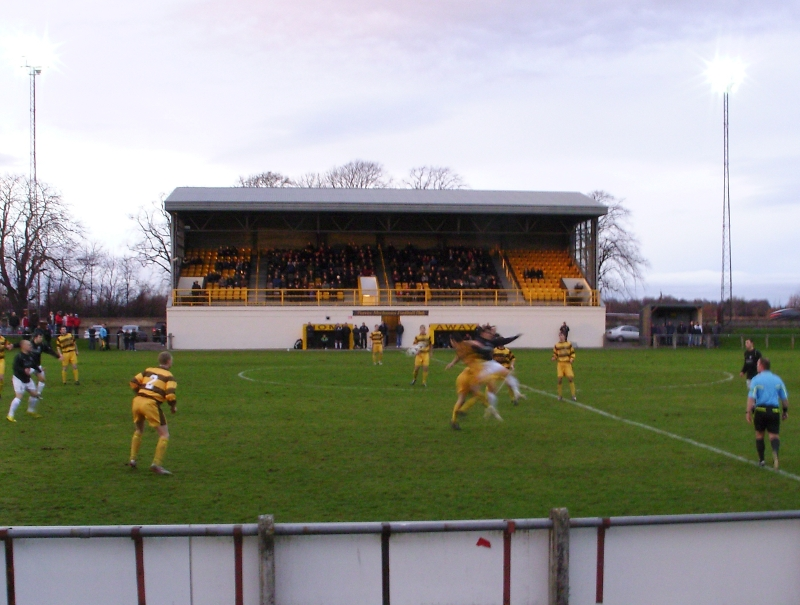
- Forres Mechanics 1 – 0 Nairn County; 3 January 2010

- Location in Moray
- Location: Lea Road, Forres, Moray, Scotland
- Coordinates: 57°36′45″N 3°36′54″W
- Owner: Moray Council
- Capacity: 2,700 (502 seated)
- Record attendance: 7000 v Celtic; 2 February 1957
- Field size: 106 x 69 yards

Tenant
- Forres Mechanics F.C.

Mosset Park is a football ground in the town of Forres in the north-east of Scotland, which is the home ground of Highland Football League side Forres Mechanics F.C. It is located on Lea Road in the north of the town and has a capacity of 2,700, with 502 seated.

== History ==
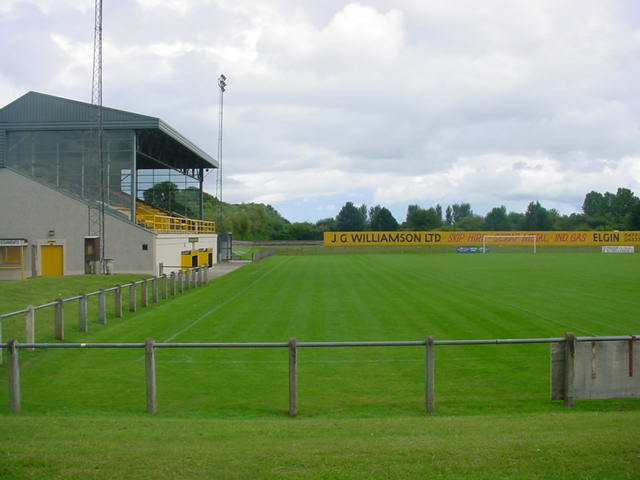
Mosset Park (2006)

Forres Mechanics' record attendance at Mosset Park came in February 1957 when 7,000 spectators watched the club take on Celtic in the fifth round of the Scottish Cup The home side lost 5–0.

The whole ground was moved a very short distance southwards – approximately the width of the pitch – when the A96 was re-routed around Forres and the old main stand, which was then the largest in the league, was lost.

Mosset Park is owned by Moray Council and rented out to the Forres-based football club. The club previously paid rent of £2.50-a-year for the stadium, but following a review in March 2012 it was raised to £4500.

== Transport ==
The nearest railway station to the ground is Forres railway station which is located half a mile south-west of Mosset Park, roughly a 10-minute walk. The station is located on the Aberdeen to Inverness Line.
