= Nairn County F.C. =

Association football club in Scotland

Nairn County
- Full name: Nairn County Football Club
- Nickname: The Wee County
- Founded: 1909
- Ground: Station Park, Nairn
- Capacity: 2,250 (250 seated)
- Chairman: Kevin Reid
- Manager: Wayne Mackintosh
- League: Highland League
- 2025–26: Highland League, 9th of 18
Home colours	Away colours	Third colours

Nairn County Football Club is a Scottish senior football club based in the town of Nairn, Highland and currently play in the Highland League. Nicknamed the Wee County, they were founded in 1909 and play at Station Park. They have played in the Highland Football League since 1919, winning their only league title in the 1975–76 season. As a full member of the Scottish Football Association, they qualify automatically to play in the Scottish Cup.

In 2022, the club hit the headlines for selling a Pie in a Roll and launching their TeamHamish charity third kit.

In the same year they became the first football club in Scotland to offer and promote a dedicated stag and hen party package.

== History ==
Nairn County were reformed in 1909 and joined the Highland League in 1919 after originally being accepted to participate in 1914. Their only league title was in the 1975–76 season, which they won after a play-off in extra time against Fraserburgh at Borough Briggs, Elgin. Recent success was achieved in the 2005–06 season, with an unexpected North of Scotland Cup win. Nairn County also won the North of Scotland Cup in 2012 by defeating Wick Academy 2–1. During Nairn's Scottish Cup run in 2012, Nairn defeated Preston Athletic and Clyde, whilst in the third round were trailing 3–0 at half time against Forfar Athletic and staged a remarkable comeback with the game ending 3–3.

Striker Conor Gethins was awarded with the Highland League Player of the Year for the 2012–13 season.

The club's record appearance holder is Glenn Main, who made 496 appearances.

The club's record goal scorer is Davy Johnston who scored 286 goals in his two spells with the club. This also included scoring a record 73 goals in the 1963–64 season.

== Stadium ==
Station Park
- Interactive map of Station Park
- Location: Balblair Rd, Nairn, Scotland
- Coordinates: 57.5790°N 3.8725°W
- Owner: Nairn County F.C.
- Capacity: 2,250 (250 seated)
- Surface: Grass

Nairn County play at Station Park in Nairn, which has a capacity of 2,250, including 250 seats.

== Club staff ==
Position	Name
Manager	Wayne Mackintosh
Assistant manager	Brian Macleod
First Team Coach	Mark Greig
First Team Coach	Martin MacDonald
Physiotherapist	Obiefuna Umeaku
Director of Football	Graeme MacLeod
Chairman	Kevin Reid

== Gallery ==
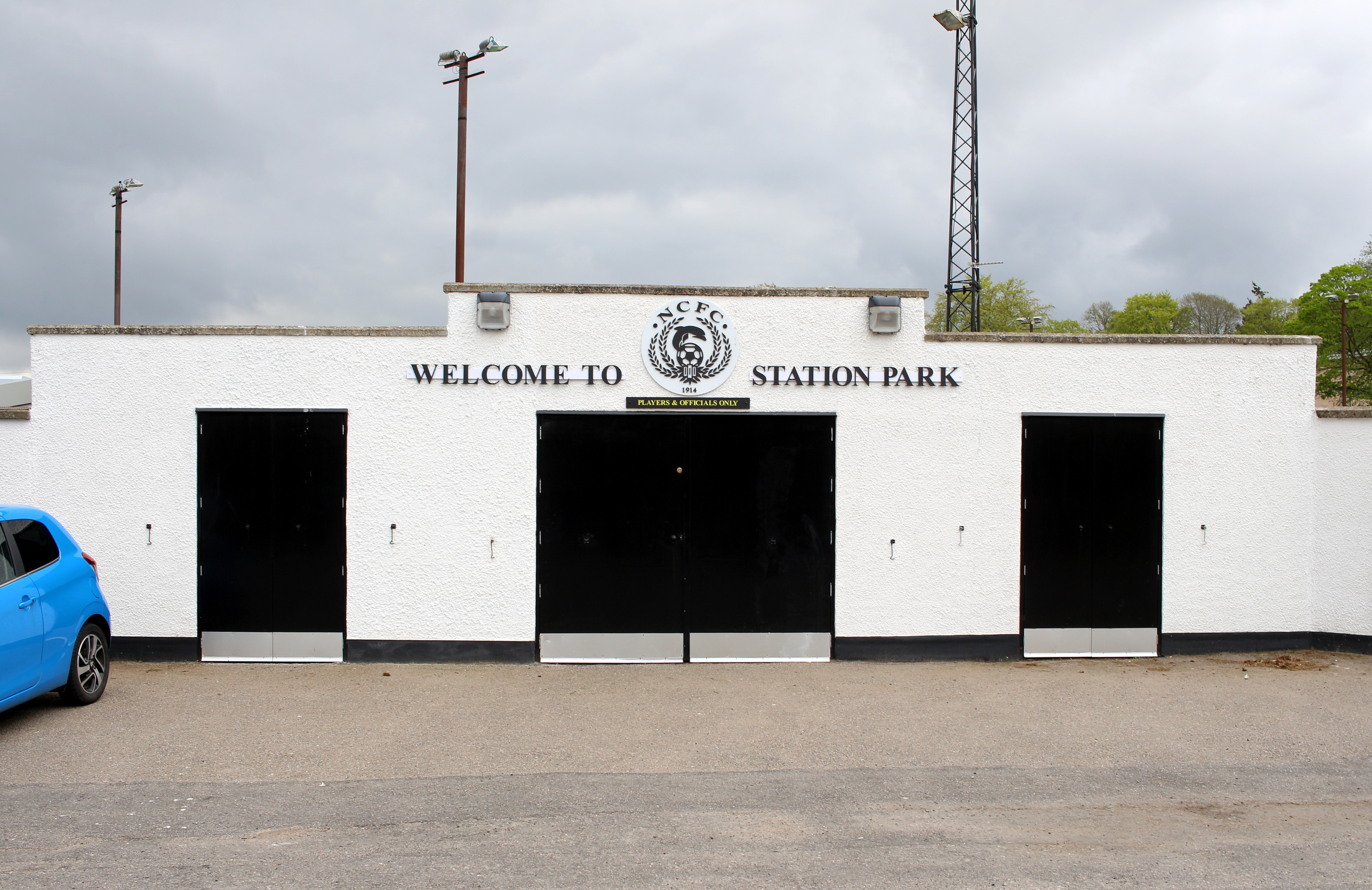
Station Park (2019)

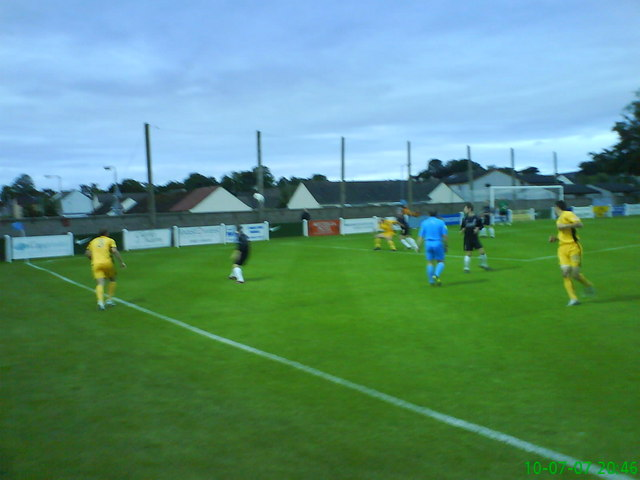
Station Park (2007)

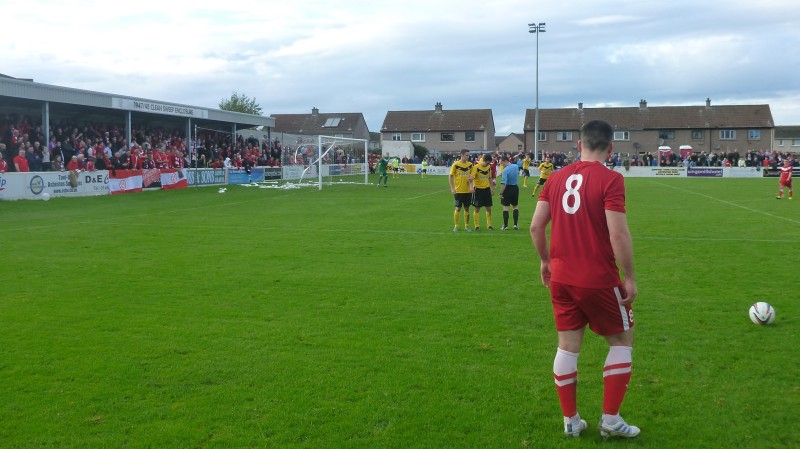
Nairn playing Brora Rangers in the 2013–14 North of Scotland Cup final

== Colours ==
Nairn County's home colours have traditionally always been yellow and black.

During 2022-2024 Nairn County's third kit featured an iconic rainbow design in honour of the Team Hamish charity.

== Club honours ==
- Highland Football League:
  - Champions: 1975–76
- League Cup:
  - Winners: 1963–64, 2010–11
- North of Scotland Cup:
  - Winners: 1956–57, 1962–63, 1963–64, 1965–66, 2005–06, 2008–09, 2012–13, 2023–24
- Inverness Cup:
  - Winners: 1977–78
- Scottish Qualifying Cup (North):
  - Winners: 1968–69
- Elgin District Cup:
  - Winners: 1919–20, 1931–32, 1935–36
- Elginshire Charity Cup:
  - Winners: 1924–25
- Inverness Sports Bed Cup:
  - Winners: 1938–39
