= Golspie Sutherland F.C. =

Association football club in Scotland

Golspie Sutherland
- Full name: Golspie Sutherland Football Club
- Founded: 1877
- Ground: King George V Park, Golspie
- Capacity: 1,000
- Coordinates: 57°58′17″N 3°59′4″W
- Chairman: Ewan Campbell
- Manager: Keegan Campbell
- League: North Caledonian League
- 2025–26: North Caledonian League, 5th of 12
Home colours

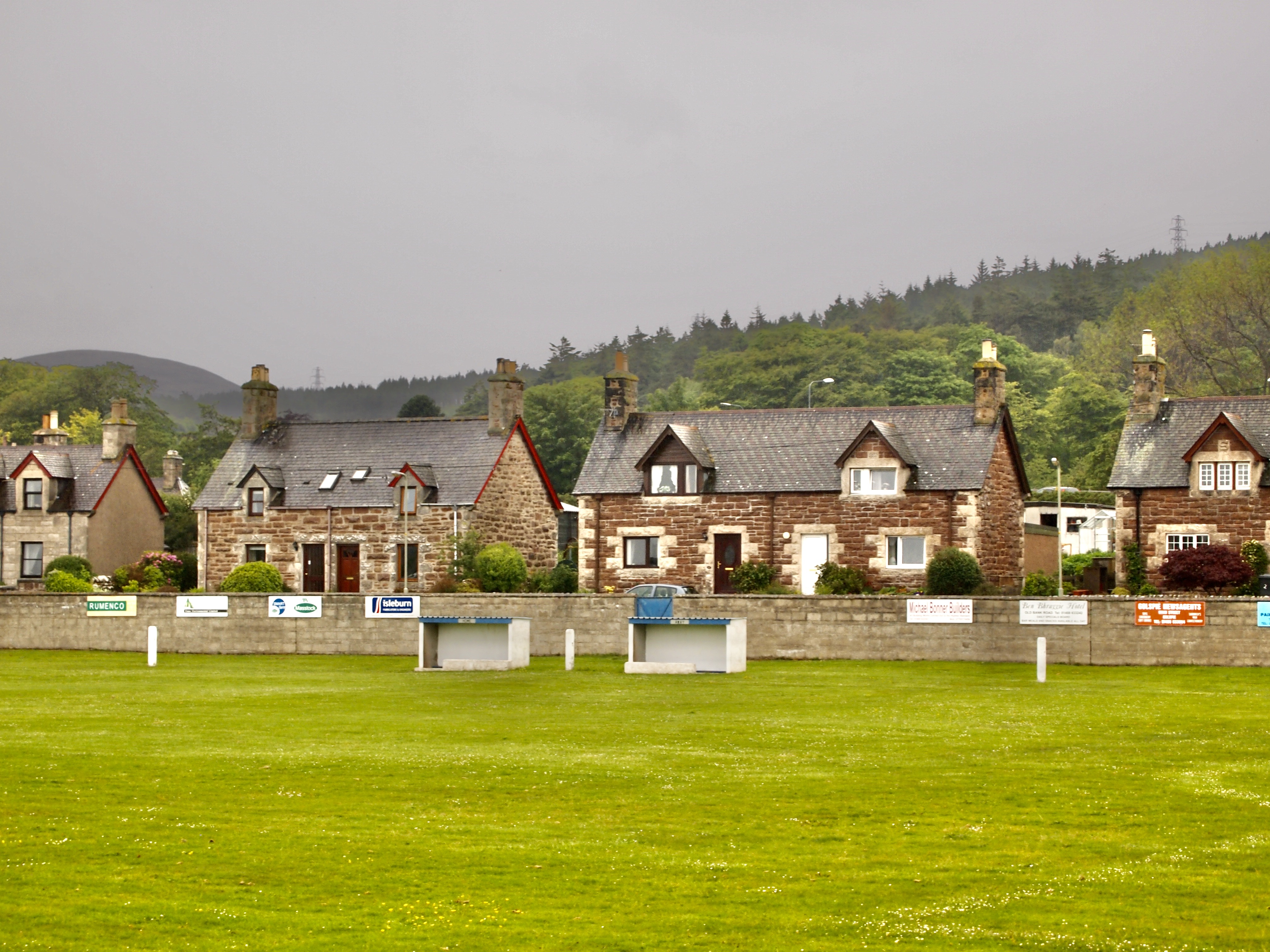
King George V Park

Golspie Sutherland Football Club are a senior association football club from Golspie, Sutherland in the Scottish Highlands. They compete in the North Caledonian Football League and are licensed members of the Scottish Football Association, playing in the Scottish Cup each season.

The team play their home matches at King George V Park.

With ten championship wins to their credit, Golspie are the most successful club currently competing in the North Caledonian League.

== Honours ==
- North Caledonian League
  - Champions: 1974–75, 1975–76, 1992–93, 1998–99, 2003–04, 2006–07, 2007–08, 2008–09, 2014–15, 2018–19, 2020–21
- North Caledonian Cup
  - Winners: 1968–69, 1974–75, 1975–76, 2000–01, 2002–03, 2007–08, 2015–16, 2016–17
- Football Times Cup
  - Winners: 1968–69, 2004–05, 2012–13, 2013–14, 2014–15
- Jock Mackay Memorial Cup
  - Winners: 2007–08, 2009–10, 2012–13, 2013–14, 2015–16
- Chic Allan Cup
  - Winners: 1974–75, 1975–76, 1999–00, 2000–01, 2001–02
- Ness Cup
  - Winners: 1971–72, 1974–75, 1975–76, 2013–14
- Morris Newton / SWL Cup
  - Winners: 1992–93, 2000–01, 2001–02, 2007–08, 2008–09, 2014–15
