= Forres Mechanics F.C. =

Association football club in Scotland

Forres Mechanics
- Full name: Forres Mechanics Football Club
- Nickname: The Can Cans
- Founded: 1884; 142 years ago
- Ground: Mosset Park, Forres
- Capacity: 2,700 (502 seated)
- Chairman: Sandy Aird
- Manager: Steven MacDonald
- League: Highland League
- 2025–26: Highland League, 12th of 18
| Home colours | Away colours |

Forres Mechanics Football Club are a senior Scottish association football club from the town of Forres, Moray, currently playing in the Highland League. They play at the town's Mosset Park. Forres Mechanics are the oldest association football club in the North of Scotland and are one of only two original teams to play in the Highland League since its first season in 1893, the other being Clachnacuddin.

== History ==
Their unusual name is variously stated to come from the town's Mechanics Institute or most likely when a group of craftsmen or mechanics split from an earlier Forres team to form their own club. Forres Mechanics have won the Highland league twice: in the 1985–86 season and in the 2011–12 season.

On 26 November 2016, Forres Mechanics played their most high-profile match in recent years when they held League One side Stenhousemuir to a 2–2 draw in 2016–17 Scottish Cup, however they lost 3–1 in the replay. During the 2020–21 season, which was greatly affected by the COVID-19 pandemic, Forres withdrew from the Highland League before returning the following season.

== Honours ==
- Highland Football League –
  - Winners (2): 1985–86, 2011–12
    - Runners Up (1): 1933–34
- Highland League Cup –
  - Winners (7): 1946–47, 1954–55, 1984–85, 1998–99, 2000–01, 2001–02, 2009–10
    - Runners Up (4): 1947–48, 1951–52, 1989–90, 2003–04
- North of Scotland Cup –
  - Winners (9): 1907–08, 1926–27, 1935–35, 1957–58, 1966–67, 1986–87, 2004–05, 2010–11, 2025–26
- Inverness Cup –
  - Winners (3): 1985–86, 1989–90, 2005–06
- Scottish Qualifying Cup (North) –
  - Winners (1): 1963–64
- Scottish Supplementary Cup (North) –
  - Winners (1): 1954–55
- Elgin District Cup –
  - Winners (12): 1892–93, 1893–94, 1894–95, 1899–1900, 1900–01, 1904–05, 1908–09, 1910–11, 1911–12, 1926–27, 1932–33, 1933–34
- Elginshire Charity Cup –
  - Winners (7): 1901–02, 1902–03, 1907–08, 1908–09, 1910–11, 1911–12, 1912–13

== Management ==
- Manager: Steven MacDonald
- Assistant Manager: David Mackay
- Coach: Mark Holmes
