= Lossiemouth F.C. =

Association football club in Scotland

Lossiemouth
- Full name: Lossiemouth Football Club
- Nickname: The Coasters
- Founded: 1945
- Ground: Grant Park, Lossiemouth
- Capacity: 3,250 (250 seated)
- Coordinates: 57.7137°N 3.2854°W
- Chairman: Ian Campbell
- Manager: Martin Charlesworth; Kevin Flett (co-managers)
- League: Highland League
- 2025–26: Highland League, 17th of 18
Home colours	Away colours

Lossiemouth Football Club are a senior football club from Lossiemouth, Moray, Scotland. They play in the Highland League.

Founded in 1945, they were admitted to the Highland League for season 1946-47 and have played in this league since that point. The club's home stadium is Grant Park.

Traditionally a team hovering around the lower end of the league table, Lossiemouth have enjoyed several cup successes, including a period in the mid-1990s that saw the club win a hat-trick of North of Scotland Cups and a Highland League Cup over a period of three seasons as well as several top three placings in the Highland League.

Lossiemouth are full members of the Scottish Football Association, and are therefore permitted to play in the Scottish Cup.

== History ==
Before Lossiemouth Football Club (1885 — 1944)

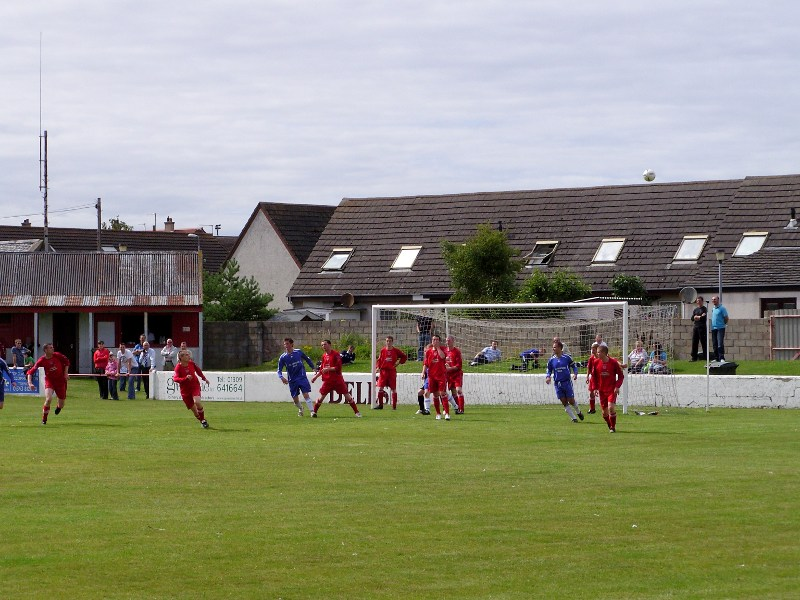
A match at Grant Park

A number of early football clubs sprung up in Lossiemouth during the 1880s, the first recorded being Lossiemouth Rangers in 1885, who merged in 1888 with Lossiemouth Artillery to form Lossiemouth Artillery Rangers. Another early club, Lossiemouth Rovers (founded 1889) reached the Elginshire Junior Cup final in their first season, but lost out to Elgin Rangers Athletic in the final at Auction Mart Park in Elgin.

From the formation of the Morayshire Junior league in 1905–06, Lossiemouth were represented by a succession of Junior football clubs playing in the Morayshire Junior League in most seasons between 1905–06 and 1936–37, most notably Lossiemouth Rangers who competed from 1925–26 to 1936–37, with particular period of success in the late 1920s at that level that included back-to-back trebles of the Morayshire Junior League title, Robertson Cup and Nicholson Cup in 1927–28 and 1928–29.

However, unlike many similarly sized population centres in the North of Scotland, Lossiemouth had no senior football club during this period, although an attempt was made to form such a club in 1934 but it did not come to fruition.

Formation and Early Years (1945 — 1955)

Following the end of World War II, Lossiemouth Football Club were founded on 12 October 1945 following a public meeting in the town to form a senior football club with the intention of joining the Highland Football League, which was on hiatus at the time due to World War 2. The club was formed in time to enter the senior Nairn & District Cup (also known as the Stuart Cup) for season 1945–46, which commenced in December 1945. Lossiemouth were drawn against Elgin City in the Nairn & District Cup first round, the first leg of which was played at home on 29 December 1945 with Lossiemouth winning the leg 3–0. This was the first of only four competitive fixtures during the 1945–46 season, all in the Nairn & District Cup.

Lossiemouth Football Club were accepted into the Highland League at the league's AGM at the Workmen's Club in Inverness on 22 June 1946 and began participation in the Highland League in the 1946–47 season. Lossiemouth began the 1946–47 season with a 5–2 home win over Forres Mechanics in the Highland League Cup on 10 August 1946 and made their Highland League debut two weeks later with a 4–1 away win at Fraserburgh. Lossiemouth went on to win the Nairn & District Cup later that season to give the club its first trophy, a feat that was later repeated in 1948–49.

Scottish Cup run and first major trophies (1955 — 1962)

Season 1955–56 remains Lossiemouth's best performance in the Scottish Cup with the club reaching the Fourth Round, defeating Wick Academy, Duns, and Selkirk before being defeated by Berwick Rangers at Shielfield Park.

Lossiemouth's first major trophy came in season 1956–57 with a win over Fraserburgh in the two-legged final of the Scottish Supplementary Cup (North), which was a temporary rebranding of the Scottish Qualifying Cup (North) during the period where all SFA member clubs were allowed direct access to the Scottish Cup.

The club won the Highland League Cup for the first time in the 1961–62 season, defeating Deveronvale 2–0 in the final at Boroughbriggs in Elgin.

Decline and financial difficulties (1962 — 1985)

Lossiemouth generally struggled in the Highland League over the next few decades which culminated in a period in the early 1980s that almost saw the club fold due to financial difficulties. Between 1978–79 and 1984–85 the club finished bottom of the Highland League six times in those seven seasons.

Late 1980s resurgence and 1990s success (1985 — 1997)

Improved fortunes thereafter saw the club start to climb the league table in subsequent seasons, and also reached North of Scotland Cup finals in 1985–86, 1986–87 and 1991–92 although the club was unsuccessful on each occasion. This resurgence ultimately led to three third-place finishes in the Highland League and several cups being won in the mid-1990s, including a hat-trick of North of Scotland Cup triumphs in 1994–95, 1995–96, and 1996–97. Season 1996–97 also saw Lossiemouth win the Highland League Cup for a second time as a result of a 2–1 win over Fraserburgh at Christie Park, Huntly.

Downturn into the new millennium (1997 — present)

A period of downturn then followed from the late 1990s onwards, although the club added two more North of Scotland Cup wins in 2000–01 and 2002–03 - which remains Lossiemouth's last trophies to date. Lossiemouth's most recent cup final was in the 2017–18 season where they were defeated 2–0 by Brora Rangers in the North of Scotland Cup final at Clachnacuddin Park, Inverness.

== Stadium ==
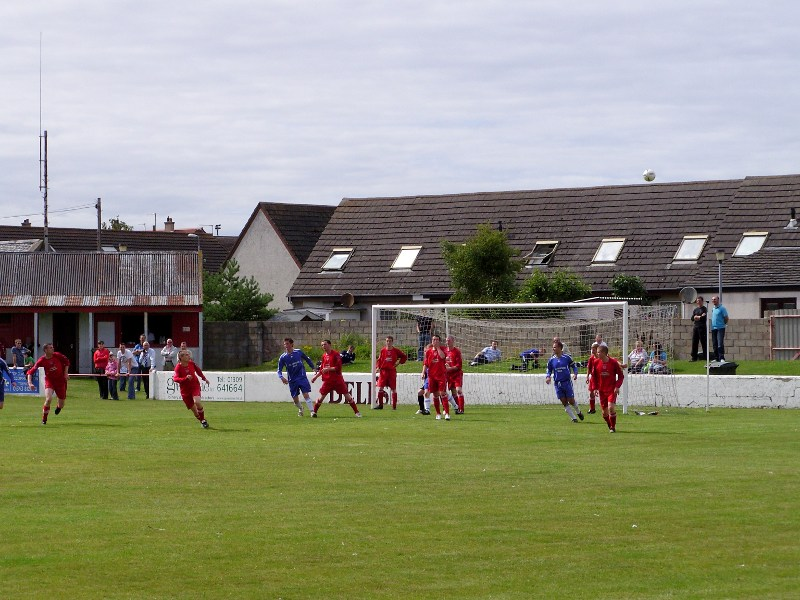
A match at Grant Park

Lossiemouth play at Grant Park in Lossiemouth. It has a capacity of 3,250, including 250 seats.

Grant Park was opened on 4 May 1925 by Lady Grant, the wife of Sir Alexander Grant, a local philanthropist who had facilitated the purchase of the land for the town for recreational purposes, including laying out a football pitch. Lady Grant kicked off a local football match in the Lossiemouth Fishermen's Cup competition to formally open the ground.

The ground became the home ground for Lossiemouth Rangers FC for season 1925–26, who began competing in the Morayshire Junior League.

In 1934 the town council made a series of improvements to Grant Park including fully enclosing the pitch, building up banking for spectators and surrounding the ground with corrugated iron fencing.

In 1945 it became the home ground of the newly formed Lossiemouth Football Club, and was also used by Lossiemouth United (who were formed in 1949) for some time before they moved to the Lossiemouth Playingfields.

The ground was purchased from the council by Lossiemouth Football Club in the late 1970s and the club continued to make improvements to the ground including new boardroom and changing facilities, the erection of floodlights and a covered enclosure. The original wooden grandstand was replaced by a new modern stand in 2009.

== Club honours ==
- Highland League Cup:
  - Winners: 1961–62, 1996–97
- North of Scotland Cup:
  - Winners: 1994–95, 1995–96, 1996–97, 2000–01, 2002–03
- Scottish Supplementary Cup (North):
  - Winners: 1956–57
- Nairn & District Cup (Stuart Cup):
  - Winners: 1946–47, 1948–49
