= Clachnacuddin F.C. =

Association football club in Scotland

Clachnacuddin
- Full name: Clachnacuddin Football Club
- Nickname: The Lilywhites
- Short name: Clach
- Founded: 1885; 141 years ago
- Ground: Grant Street Park, Merkinch, Inverness
- Capacity: 3,000 (154 seated)
- Coordinates: 57.4858°N 4.2380°W
- Owner: Clachnacuddin Supporters Trust
- Chairman: Chris Stewart
- Manager: Conor Gethins
- League: Highland League
- 2025–26: Highland League, 5th of 18
- Website: clachfc.co.uk
Home colours	Away colours

Clachnacuddin Football Club is a part-time, senior Scottish football club based in the city of Inverness, that currently plays in the Highland League.

Clachnacuddin have won the most Highland Football League championships in the competition's history: a total of 18, a title shared with now defunct side, Caledonian. Their home ground is Grant Street Park in the city's Merkinch area. They also have a youth system, with many teams ranging from the primary squads to the under 19s.

They were founded in 1885 and are nicknamed "The Lilywhites" (due to their white strip) or "Clach". Their name is an English approximation of a Scots Gaelic name meaning "the stone of the tub", referring to a city landmark in Inverness.

As a full member of the Scottish FA, they are entitled to enter the Scottish Cup each year.

== Ground ==
Clachnacuddin have played at Grant Street Park in the Merkinch area of Inverness since the ground opened in 1886. The stadium has a maximum capacity of 3,000 spectators.

The record attendance for a football match played at Grant Street Park was set on January 17th 1948, when a crowd of around 9,000 spectators saw a Scottish Cup 1st round tie between St Johnstone and Clachnacuddin.

On 23 May 1988 a major fire destroyed Grant Street's wooden grandstand, with vandalism blamed.

On the morning of Christmas Eve 2019, a fire broke out in the kit room due to an electrical fault in a tumble drier. As a result, Clachnacuddin's home game against Formartine United was called off. Following this incident, Clach were put into a temporary groundshare with Highland RFC at Canal Park, in the Bught area of Inverness.

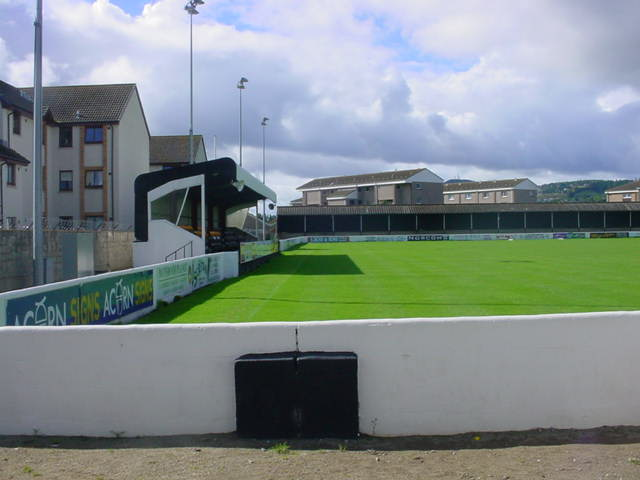

== Reserves ==
Clachnacuddin's reserve team plays in the North Caledonian Football League, which they rejoined in 2022–23 after withdrawing at the start of the 2014–15 season.

Clachnacuddin Reserves (also known as Clachnacuddin 'A') relocated their home ground at the start of the 2026–27 season to the newly redeveloped £9.6 million pound Bught Park.

The club intermittently runs an amateur team in the local Inverness and District League.

== Honours ==
- Highland Football League
  - Champions: 1894–95, 1896–97, 1897–98, 1900–01, 1902–03, 1903–04, 1904–05, 1905–06, 1907–08, 1911–12, 1920–21, 1921–22, 1922–23, 1923–24, 1938–39, 1947–48, 1974–75, 2003–04
- Highland League Cup
  - Winners: 1947–48, 1950–51, 1981–82, 2003–04, 2013–14
- North of Scotland Cup
  - Winners: 1894–95, 1895–96, 1897–98, 1899–1900, 1902–03, 1903–04, 1905–06, 1906–07, 1919–20, 1920–21, 1922–23, 1937–38, 1939–40, 1946–47, 1947–48, 1948–49, 1949–50, 1953–54, 1964–65, 1979–80, 1992–93, 2001–02
- Inverness Cup
  - Winners: 1897–98, 1900–01 1903–04, 1904–05, 1906–07, 1909–10, 1919–20, 1921–22, 1923–24, 1928–29, 1929–30, 1936–37, 1951–52, 1952–53
- Scottish Qualifying Cup (North)
  - Winners: 1934–35, 1938–39, 1947–48, 1974–75, 1998–99
- Bells Cup
  - Winners: 1977–78
- Inverness Charity Cup
  - Winners: 1896–97, 1897–98, 1903–04, 1904–05, 1920–21, 1927–28, 1932–33, 1937–38, 1938–39, 1947–48, 1948–49
- Elginshire Charity Cup
  - Winners: 1896–97, 1897–98, 1899–1900, 1905–06
- Inverness Sports Bed Cup
  - Winners: 1937–38

== Club records ==
- Record attendance: 9,000 vs St Johnstone, 17 January 1948 (as per the 'Inverness Courier' dated 20 January 1948).
