= 2019–20 Inverness Caledonian Thistle F.C. season =

Scottish football club season

Inverness Caledonian Thistle
2019–20 season
- Chairman: Graham Rae and Ross Morrison
- Manager: John Robertson
- Stadium: Caledonian Stadium
- Championship: 2nd
- Scottish Cup: Quarter-finals lost 5–2 vs. Hibernian
- League Cup: Group stage
- Challenge Cup: Winners
- Top goalscorer: League: Jordan White (7); All: Jordan White (10)
- Highest home attendance: 2,902; vs Dundee United (2 November 2019)
- Lowest home attendance: 1,021; vs Greenock Morton (7 September 2019)
- Average home league attendance: 1,962
Home colours	Away colours	Third colours

The 2019–20 Inverness Caledonian Thistle season was the club's 26th Season in Scottish football and their third consecutive season in the Championship, the second tier of Scottish football.

== Fixtures and results ==
=== Friendlies ===
29 June 2019 Friendly	Strathspey Thistle	3–6	Inverness Caledonian Thistle XI	Grantown-on-Spey
13:00				Stadium: Seafield Park

29 June 2019 Friendly	Clachnacuddin	0–2	Inverness Caledonian Thistle XI	Inverness
13:00			Keatings 7', Todorov 59'	Stadium: Grant Street Park

2 July 2019 Friendly	Forres Mechanics	1–6	Inverness Caledonian Thistle XI	Forres
19:45	Taylor 79'		Todorov 19', 55' Keatings 20', 37' Walsh 50' Harkness 89'	Stadium: Mosset Park

2 July 2019 Friendly	Rothes	1–7	Inverness Caledonian Thistle XI	Rothes
19:45	Wilson 81'		Curry 11', 75' Rooney 19' Doran 30', 36' White 71' MacGregor 83'	Stadium: Mackessack Park

6 July 2019 Friendly	Inverness Caledonian Thistle	1–1	Aberdeen	Elgin
15:00	McKay 69'		Main (penalty scored)	Stadium: Borough Briggs

8 July 2019 Angus Beith benefit	Heart of Midlothian	1–1	Inverness Caledonian Thistle	Edinburgh
19:30	McDonald 21'		Curry 77'	Stadium: Tynecastle

10 July 2019 Friendly	Wick Academy	3–2	Inverness Caledonian Thistle XI	Wick
19:30				Stadium: Harmsworth Park

12 July 2019 Friendly	Inverness Caledonian Thistle	3–1	St Johnstone	Inverness
19:30	Keatings 36' Todorov 67' Machado 85'		Tanser (penalty scored)	Stadium: Grant Street

13 July 2019 Friendly	Buckie Thistle	3–4	Inverness Caledonian Thistle XI	Buckie
14:00				Stadium: Victoria Park

19 July 2019 Friendly	Brora Rangers	2–2	Inverness Caledonian Thistle XI	Brora
19:30				Stadium: Dudgeon Park

4 August 2019 Friendly	St Duthus	3–7	Inverness Caledonian Thistle XI	Tain
14:00				Stadium: Grant Park

April 2020 Ryan Esson Testimonial	Inverness Caledonian Thistle	Cancelled	Inverness Caledonian Thistle Legends XI	Inverness
TBC				Stadium: Canal Park
Note: Initially cancelled due to COVID-19, eventually cancelled outright in December due to COVID-19 still going on and replaced by charity auction.

=== League ===
3 August 2019 Championship	Dundee United	4–1	Inverness Caledonian Thistle	Dundee
15:00	Shankland 7', 31', 53', 86'		Walsh 29'	Stadium: Tannadice Park

10 August 2019 Championship	Inverness Caledonian Thistle	2–1	Arbroath	Inverness
15:00	Doran 44', Storey 82'		Linn 26'	Stadium: Caledonian Stadium

24 August 2019 Championship	Dundee	0–0	Inverness Caledonian Thistle	Dundee
15:00				Stadium: Dens Park

30 August 2019 Championship	Inverness Caledonian Thistle	5–0	Greenock Morton	Inverness
19:05	Keatings 43', 46', White 67', Donaldson 77', Todorov 80'	Report		Stadium: Caledonian Thistle; Attendance: 2,136
Note: Live on BBC Scotland

14 September 2019 Championship	Dunfermline Athletic	0–1	Inverness Caledonian Thistle	Dunfermline
15:00			Welsh 87'	Stadium: East End Park

21 September 2019 Championship	Inverness Caledonian Thistle	2–0	Queen of the South	Inverness
15:00	Welsh 15', Walsh 20'			Stadium: Caledonian Stadium

28 September 2019 Championship	Inverness Caledonian Thistle	1–3	Partick Thistle	Inverness
15:00	White 21'		Zannata 10', Miller 46', Palmer 82'	Stadium: Caledonian Stadium

5 October 2019 Championship	Ayr United	0–2	Inverness Caledonian Thistle	Ayr
15:00			Vincent 31', Rooney 64'	Stadium: Somerset Park

19 October 2019 Championship	Inverness Caledonian Thistle	2–2	Alloa Athletic	Inverness
15:00	Tremarco 61', White 85'		Buchanan 5', Trouten 89'	Stadium: Caledonian Stadium

26 October 2019 Championship	Greenock Morton	2–1	Inverness Caledonian Thistle	Greenock
15:00	McHugh 6', 81'		Curry 27'	Stadium: Cappielow

29 October 2019 Championship	Queen of the South	0–2	Inverness Caledonian Thistle	Dumfries
19:45			Doran 30', Todorov 90+3'	Stadium: Palmerston Park

2 November 2019 Championship	Inverness Caledonian Thistle	0–3	Dundee United	Inverness
15:00			Rooney {{o.g.|20}}, Clark 72' Shankland (76 p)	Stadium: Caledonian Thistle

9 November 2019 Championship	Arbroath	3–0	Inverness Caledonian Thistle	Arbroath
15:00	Stewart 28', Linn (54 p), Kader 86'			Stadium: Gayfield Park

23 November 2019 Championship	Inverness Caledonian Thistle	1–0	Dundee	Inverness
15:00	Doran 16'			Stadium: Caledonian Stadium; Attendance: 2,184

30 November 2019 Championship	Alloa Athletic	0–2	Inverness Caledonian Thistle	Alloa
15:00	Dick (red card)		Taggart (o.g.), Doran 45'	Stadium: Indodrill Stadium; Attendance: 721

7 December 2019 Championship	Inverness Caledonian Thistle	2–0	Ayr United	Inverness
15:00	White 20', Storey 63'			Stadium: Caledonian Stadium; Attendance: 1,833

14 December 2019 Championship	Partick Thistle	3–1	Inverness Caledonian Thistle	Glasgow
15:00	Jones 48', Saunders 64', Zanatta 90'		Keatings 57'	Stadium: Firhill Stadium; Attendance: 2,144

21 December 2019 Championship	Inverness Caledonian Thistle	2–0	Dunfermline Athletic	Inverness
15:00	Rooney 33', McCart 80'			Stadium: Caledonian Stadium; Attendance: 2,116

28 December 2019 Championship	Inverness Caledonian Thistle	0–1	Arbroath	Inverness
15:00			Donnelly 47'	Stadium: Caledonian Stadium

4 January 2020 Championship	Dundee	0–2	Inverness Caledonian Thistle	Dundee
15:00			Doran 17', Keatings 24'	Stadium: Dens Park; Attendance: 5,040

11 January 2020 Championship	Inverness Caledonian Thistle	P – P	Queen of the South	Inverness
15:00				Stadium: Caledonian Stadium

25 January 2020 Championship	Ayr United	1–0	inverness Caledonian Thistle	Ayr
15:00	Kelly 61'			Stadium: Somerset Park

1 February 2020 Championship	Inverness Caledonian Thistle	1–1	Alloa Athletic	Inverness
15:00	White 59'		Flannigan (penalty scored)	Stadium: Caledonian Stadium

21 February 2020 Championship	Dundee United	2–1	Inverness Caledonian Thistle	Dundee
19:05	Appere 12', Shankland 59'		White 32'	Stadium: Tannadice

25 February 2020 Championship	Dunfermline Athletic	1–2	Inverness Caledonian Thistle	Dunfermline
19:45	Thomas 70'		Doran 23', Walsh 77'	Stadium: East End Park

3 March 2020 Championship	Inverness Caledonian Thistle	3–2	Greenock Morton	Inverness
19:45	White 18', Rooney 67', Todorov 90'		Nesbitt 61', Lyon 76'	Stadium: Caledonian Stadium

7 March 2020 Championship	Alloa Athletic	2–0	Inverness Caledonian Thistle	Alloa
15:00	Connelly 12', Trouten 28'			Stadium: Indodrill Stadium

10 March 2020 Championship	Inverness Caledonian Thistle	3–1	Queen of the South	Inverness
19:45	Vincent 30', Keatings 57', Storey 79'		Semple 72'	Stadium: Caledonian Stadium

ALL SPFL GAMES POSTPONED FOR FORESEEABLE FUTURE DUE TO CORONAVIRUS PANDEMIC

14 March 2020 Championship	Arbroath	P – P	Inverness Caledonian Thistle	Arbroath
15:00				Stadium: Gayfield Park

17 March 2020 Championship	Inverness Caledonian Thistle	P – P	Partick Thistle	Inverness
19:45				Stadium: Caledonian Stadium

21 March 2020 Championship	Inverness Caledonian Thistle	P – P	Dundee	Inverness
15:00				Stadium: Caledonian Stadium

28 March 2020 Championship	Inverness Caledonian Thistle	P – P	Ayr United	Inverness
15:00				Stadium: Caledonian Stadium
Note: Postponed due to fixture clash with Scottish Challenge Cup Final

=== Scottish Cup ===
18 January 2020 Fourth Round	Alloa Athletic	2–3	Inverness Caledonian Thistle	Alloa
15:00	Cawley 18', O'Hara 75'		Doran 8', White 61', Trafford 86'	Stadium: Indodrill Stadium

8 February 2020 Fifth Round	Inverness Caledonian Thistle	1–0	Livingston	Inverness
15:01	Welsh 61'			Stadium: Caledonian Stadium

28 February 2020 Quarter Finals	Hibernian	5–2	Inverness Caledonian Thistle	Edinburgh
19:45	Jackson 38', Allan 58', Docherty 71', Omeonga 81', Gullan 84'		Tremarco 73', McKay (red card) 74', Todorov 88'	Stadium: Easter Road

=== League Cup ===
On 28 May 2019, Inverness were drawn into Group D of the Scottish League Cup, alongside Dundee, Raith Rovers, Peterhead and Cove Rangers.

16 July 2019	Peterhead	0–0 (11–10 p)	Inverness Caledonian Thistle	Peterhead
19:45		Report		Stadium: Balmoor Stadium; Attendance: 606
	Penalties
	(penalty scored) McAllister, (penalty scored) Gibson, (penalty scored) Leitch, (penalty scored) Stevenson, (penalty scored) Armour, (penalty scored) Boyle, (penalty scored) Brown, (penalty scored) Dunlop, (penalty scored) Eadie, (penalty scored) Ferry, (penalty scored) Fleming		(penalty scored) White, (penalty scored) Donaldson, (penalty scored) Todorov, (penalty scored) Walsh, (penalty scored) Tremarco, (penalty scored) Carson, (penalty scored) Trafford, (penalty scored) McCart, (penalty scored) MacGregor, (penalty missed) Ridgers,

20 July 2019	Inverness Caledonian Thistle	4–1	Raith Rovers	Inverness
15:00	White 6' Donaldson 56' Doran 58' Todorov 90+2'		Allan 50'	Stadium: Caledonian Stadium; Attendance: 1,064

23 July 2019	Inverness Caledonian Thistle	3–2	Cove Rangers	Inverness
19:45	White 38', Keatings 55', Todorov 71'		Megginson 45', 46'	Stadium: Caledonian Stadium

28 July 2019	Dundee	1–0	Inverness Caledonian Thistle	Dundee
15:00	Johnson 33'			Stadium: Dens Park

=== Challenge Cup ===
7 September 2019 Third Round	Inverness Caledonian Thistle	3–1	Greenock Morton	Inverness
15:00	Todorov 25', Doran 31', Storey 57'		Sutton 78'	Stadium: Caledonian Stadium

12 October 2019 Fourth Round	Inverness Caledonian Thistle	3–0	Alloa Athletic	Inverness
15:00	Curry 42', Storey 64', Machado 88'			Stadium: Caledonian Stadium

17 November 2019 Quarter-final	Inverness Caledonian Thistle	0–0 (4–2 p)	Clyde	Inverness
15:00				Stadium: Caledonian Stadium
	Penalties
	Todorov (penalty scored) , Tremarco (penalty scored) , Donaldson (penalty scored) , Keatings (penalty scored)		(penalty scored) Grant, (penalty missed) Wallace, (penalty scored) McMullin, (penalty missed) McStay

16 February 2020 Semi-final	Inverness Caledonian Thistle	2–1	Rangers U21s	Inverness
14:10	Keatings 44', (yellow card) 58' (yellow-red card) Storey 73'		Mebude 6'	Stadium: Caledonian Stadium

28 March 2020 Final	Inverness Caledonian Thistle	P – P	Raith Rovers	Perth
16:10				Stadium: McDiarmid Park
Note: Postponed due to Coronavirus Pandemic

Cancelled Final	Inverness Caledonian Thistle	Shared	Raith Rovers

=== North of Scotland Cup ===
31 July 2019 First Round	Lossiemouth	1–3	Inverness Caledonian Thistle XI	Lossiemouth
				Stadium: Grant Park

20 August 2019 Quarter Finals	Inverness Caledonian Thistle XI	3–1	Forres Mechanics	Inverness
				Stadium: Caledonian Stadium

4 September 2019 Semi Final	Inverness Caledonian Thistle XI	4–1	Clachnacuddin	Inverness
				Stadium: Caledonian Stadium

6 October 2019 Final	Inverness Caledonian Thistle XI	2–3	Brora Rangers	Forres
				Stadium: Mosset Park

== Team statistics ==
=== League table ===
Pos	Team	Pld	W	D	L	GF	GA	GD	Pts	PPG	Promotion, qualification or relegation (Note: All play-off matches were cancelled, as clubs voted to curtail the season due to the COVID-19 pandemic in Scotland.)
1	Dundee United (C, P)	28	18	5	5	52	22	+30	59	2.11	Promotion to the Premiership
2	Inverness Caledonian Thistle	27	14	3	10	39	32	+7	45	1.67	
3	Dundee	27	11	8	8	32	31	+1	41	1.52	
4	Ayr United	27	12	4	11	38	35	+3	40	1.48	
5	Arbroath	26	10	6	10	24	26	−2	36	1.38	

Source: SPFL
Rules for classification: 1) Points per game.
(C) Champions; (P) Promoted

== First team player statistics ==
=== League Goalscorers ===
Rank	Player	Goals
1st	(Scotland) Jordan White	7
2nd	(Republic of Ireland) Aaron Doran	6
3rd	(Scotland) James Keatings	5
4th	(Bulgaria) Nikolay Todorov	4
=	(Scotland) Shaun Rooney	4
=	(Scotland) Tom Walsh	4
7th	(England) Miles Storey	3
8th	(Scotland) Sean Welsh	2
=	(England) James Vincent	2
9th	(Scotland) Coll Donaldson	1
=	(Scotland) Jamie McCart	1
=	(England) Carl Tremarco	1
=	(England) Mitchell Curry	1

=== Overall Goalscorers ===
Rank	Nation	Player	Goals
1st	SCO	Jordan White	10
2nd	IRE	Aaron Doran	9
3rd	BUL	Nikolay Todorov	7
3rd	SCO	James Keatings	7
5th	ENG	Miles Storey	5
6th	SCO	Shaun Rooney	3
6th	SCO	Tom Walsh	3
6th	SCO	Sean Welsh	3
9th	SCO	Coll Donaldson	2
9th	CAN	Charlie Trafford	2
9th	ENG	Carl Tremarco	2
9th	ENG	Mitchell Curry	2
9th	ENG	James Vincent	2
14th	BRA	Matheus Machado	1
14th	SCO	Jamie McCart	1
Total Goals Scored			59

*as of match played 10 March 2020

**players in Italics left the club during the season, so cannot move up the table

=== Transfers ===
Transfers In
Player	Age*	Pos	From	Fee	Date	Notes
(Scotland) James Keatings	27	FW	(Scotland) Hamilton Academical	Pre-contract agreement	13 May 2019	
(England) David Carson	23	MF	(England) Morpeth Town	Free	16 May 2019	
(Bulgaria) Nikolay Todorov	22	ST	(Scotland) Falkirk	Free	19 June 2019	
(England) James Vincent	29	MF	(Scotland) Dundee	Free	20 June 2019	
(England) Miles Storey	25	ST	(Scotland) Partick Thistle	Free	3 August 2019	
(Scotland) Lewis Toshney	27	DF	(Scotland) Falkirk	Free	10 January 2020	

Transfers Out
Player	Age*	Pos	To	Fee	Date	Notes
(Scotland) Liam Polworth	24	MF	(Scotland) Motherwell	Pre-contract agreement	17 April 2019	
(England) Nathan Austin	25	FW	(Scotland) Kelty Hearts	Free	19 May 2019	
(Scotland) Joe Chalmers	25	MF	(Scotland) Ross County	Free	20 May 2019	
(Northern Ireland) Darren McCauley	27	MF	(Northern Ireland) Derry City	Free	7 June 2019	
(Wales) Owain Fôn Williams	32	GK	(Scotland) Hamilton Academical	Free	1 July 2019	
(Scotland) Coll Donaldson	24	DF	(Scotland) Ross County	Undisclosed	15 January 2020	
(Scotland) Jamie McCart	22	DF	(Scotland) St Johnstone	Undisclosed	28 January 2020	
(Scotland) Kieran Chalmers	19	MF	(Scotland) Strathspey Thistle	Free	13 February 2020	

Loans In/Return
Player	Age*	Pos	From	Duration	Date In	Date Out	Notes
(England) Mitchell Curry	19	ST	(England) Middlesbrough	6 Months	26 June 2019	6 January 2020	
(Scotland) Daniel Hoban	21	GK	(Scotland) Elgin City	Loan Return	3 January 2020	N/A	
(Scotland) Jack Brown	18	MF	(Scotland) Fort William	Loan Return	16 January 2020	N/A	
(Scotland) Martin MacKinnon	19	GK	(Scotland) Fort William	Loan Return	16 January 2020		

Loans Out/Return
Player	Age*	Pos	To	Duration	Date Out	Date In	Notes
(Scotland) Anthony McDonald	18	MF	(Scotland) Heart of Midlothian	Loan Return	End of Previous Season	N/A	
9 Academy Players	18/19	Various	(Scotland) Fort William	Full Season	25 July 2019		
(Scotland) Daniel MacKay	18	MF	(Scotland) Elgin City	Full Season			Loan extended in January 2020
(Scotland) Daniel Hoban	21	GK	(Scotland) Elgin City	Half Season		3 January 2020	
(Scotland) Cameron Harper	18	DF	(Scotland) Elgin City	Half Season	3 January 2020	30 January 2020	Recalled from loan due to lack of defenders
(Scotland) Daniel Hoban	21	GK	(Scotland) Fort William	Half Season	16 January 2020		
(Scotland) Jack Brown	18	MF	(Scotland) Rothes	Half Season	16 January 2020		
(Scotland) Lewis Hyde	17	MF	(Scotland) Fort William	Half Season	16 January 2020		

*At time of transfer/loan

== See also ==
- List of Inverness Caledonian Thistle F.C. seasons
