= 2021–22 Scottish Premiership =

116th season of top-tier football league in Scotland

Scottish Premiership
- Season: 2021–22
- Dates: 31 July 2021 – 15 May 2022
- Champions: Celtic; 8th Premiership title 52nd Scottish title
- Relegated: Dundee
- Champions League: Celtic; Rangers
- Europa League: Heart of Midlothian
- Europa Conference League: Dundee United; Motherwell
- Matches: 228
- Goals: 563 (2.47 per match)
- Top goalscorer: Regan Charles-Cook; Giorgos Giakoumakis (13 goals each)
- Biggest home win: Celtic 7–0 St Johnstone (9 April 2022)
- Biggest away win: Dundee 0–5 Ross County (27 October 2021); Motherwell 1–6 Rangers (31 October 2021)
- Highest scoring: Motherwell 1–6 Rangers (31 October 2021); Heart of Midlothian 5–2 Dundee United (6 November 2021); Celtic 7–0 St Johnstone (9 April 2022)
- Longest winning run: Rangers; 9 games
- Longest unbeaten run: Celtic; 32 games
- Longest winless run: Dundee; Motherwell; St Mirren; 11 games
- Longest losing run: St Johnstone; 8 games
- Highest attendance: 59,077; Celtic 3–0 Rangers (2 February 2022)
- Lowest attendance: 500 (6 games)
- Total attendance: 3,317,909
- Average attendance: 15,800

The 2021–22 Scottish Premiership (known as the cinch Premiership for sponsorship reasons) was the ninth season of the Scottish Premiership, the highest division of Scottish football, and the 125th edition overall of the top national league competition, not including one cancelled due to World War II. The season began on 31 July 2021. In December, the Scottish Government imposed stadium capacity restrictions as part of its response to the new Omicron variant. As a result, the winter break was brought forward from 4 January to 27 December. The rule of five substitutions per match was also re-introduced (as used the previous season) after the winter break.

Twelve teams contested the league: Aberdeen, Celtic, Dundee, Dundee United, Heart of Midlothian, Hibernian, Livingston, Motherwell, Rangers, Ross County, St Johnstone and St Mirren.

On 11 May 2022, Celtic officially claimed the Premiership title back from Rangers following a 1–1 draw with Dundee United, going undefeated in the final 32 league matches of the season.

== Teams ==
The following teams changed division after the 2020–21 season.

Promoted from the Championship

- Heart of Midlothian
- Dundee

Relegated to the Championship

- Hamilton Academical
- Kilmarnock

=== Stadia and locations ===
Aberdeen	Celtic	Dundee	Dundee United
Pittodrie Stadium	Celtic Park	Dens Park	Tannadice Park
Capacity: 20,866	Capacity: 60,411	Capacity: 11,775	Capacity: 14,223
Heart of Midlothian	Location of teams in the 2021–22 Scottish Premiership		Hibernian
Tynecastle Park	Location of teams in the 2021–22 Scottish Premiership		Easter Road
Capacity: 20,099	Location of teams in the 2021–22 Scottish Premiership		Capacity: 20,421
Livingston	Location of teams in the 2021–22 Scottish Premiership		Motherwell
Almondvale Stadium	Location of teams in the 2021–22 Scottish Premiership		Fir Park
Capacity: 9,713	Location of teams in the 2021–22 Scottish Premiership		Capacity: 13,677
Rangers	Ross County	St Johnstone	St Mirren
Ibrox Stadium	Victoria Park	McDiarmid Park	St Mirren Park
Capacity: 50,817	Capacity: 6,541	Capacity: 10,696	Capacity: 7,937

=== Personnel and kits ===
Team	Manager	Captain	Kit manufacturer	Shirt sponsor
Aberdeen	(Republic of Ireland) Jim Goodwin	(England) Joe Lewis	Adidas	Saltire Energy
Celtic	(Australia) Ange Postecoglou	(Scotland) Callum McGregor	Adidas	Dafabet
Dundee	(Scotland) Mark McGhee	(Scotland) Charlie Adam	Macron	Crown Engineering Services
Dundee United	(Scotland) Tam Courts	(England) Ryan Edwards	Macron	Eden Mill St Andrews
Heart of Midlothian	(Scotland) Robbie Neilson	(Scotland) Craig Gordon	Umbro	MND Scotland
Hibernian	(Scotland) David Gray (caretaker)	(Scotland) Paul Hanlon	Joma	Utilita
Livingston	(Scotland) David Martindale	(Scotland) Nicky Devlin	Joma	Phoenix Drilling Ltd
Motherwell	(Scotland) Graham Alexander	(Scotland) Stephen O'Donnell	Macron	Paycare
Rangers	(Netherlands) Giovanni van Bronckhorst	(England) James Tavernier	Castore	32Red
Ross County	(Scotland) Malky Mackay	(Scotland) Keith Watson	Joma	Ross-shire Engineering
St Johnstone	(Scotland) Callum Davidson	(Scotland) Liam Gordon	Macron	Binn Group
St Mirren	(Northern Ireland) Stephen Robinson	(Republic of Ireland) Joe Shaughnessy	Joma	Digby Brown

=== Managerial changes ===
Team	Outgoing manager	Manner of departure	Date of vacancy	Position in table	Incoming manager	Date of appointment
Celtic	(Scotland) John Kennedy	End of interim spell	15 May 2021	Pre-season	(Australia) Ange Postecoglou	10 June 2021
Ross County	(Scotland) John Hughes	End of contract	24 May 2021	Pre-season	(Scotland) Malky Mackay	26 May 2021
Dundee United	(Scotland) Micky Mellon	Mutual consent	25 May 2021	Pre-season	(Scotland) Tam Courts	7 June 2021
Rangers	(England) Steven Gerrard	Signed by Aston Villa	11 November 2021	1st	(Netherlands) Giovanni van Bronckhorst	18 November 2021
Hibernian	(Scotland) Jack Ross	Sacked	9 December 2021	7th	(Scotland) Shaun Maloney	20 December 2021
Aberdeen	(Scotland) Stephen Glass	Sacked	13 February 2022	9th	(Republic of Ireland) Jim Goodwin	19 February 2022
Dundee	(Northern Ireland) James McPake	Sacked	16 February 2022	11th	(Scotland) Mark McGhee	17 February 2022
St Mirren	(Republic of Ireland) Jim Goodwin	Signed by Aberdeen	19 February 2022	6th	(Northern Ireland) Stephen Robinson	22 February 2022
Hibernian	(Scotland) Shaun Maloney	Sacked	19 April 2022	7th	(Scotland) David Gray (caretaker)	19 April 2022

== Format ==
In the initial phase of the season, the 12 teams will play a round-robin tournament whereby each team plays each one of the other teams three times. After 33 games, the league splits into two sections of six teams, with each team playing each other in that section. The league attempts to balance the fixture list so that teams in the same section play each other twice at home and twice away, but sometimes this is impossible. A total of 228 matches will be played, with 38 matches played by each team.

== League summary ==
=== League table ===
Pos	Team	Pld	W	D	L	GF	GA	GD	Pts	Qualification or relegation (Note: Teams play each other three times (33 matches), before the league is split into two groups (the top six and the bottom six).)
1	Celtic (C)	38	29	6	3	92	22	+70	93	Qualification for the Champions League group stage
2	Rangers	38	27	8	3	80	31	+49	89	Qualification for the Champions League third qualifying round
3	Heart of Midlothian	38	17	10	11	54	44	+10	61	Qualification for the Europa League play-off round
4	Dundee United	38	12	12	14	37	44	−7	48	Qualification for the Europa Conference League third qualifying round
5	Motherwell	38	12	10	16	42	61	−19	46	Qualification for the Europa Conference League second qualifying round
6	Ross County	38	10	11	17	47	61	−14	41	
7	Livingston	38	13	10	15	41	46	−5	49	
8	Hibernian	38	11	12	15	38	42	−4	45	
9	St Mirren	38	10	14	14	33	51	−18	44	
10	Aberdeen	38	10	11	17	41	46	−5	41	
11	St Johnstone (O)	38	8	11	19	24	51	−27	35	Qualification for the Premiership play-off final
12	Dundee (R)	38	6	11	21	34	64	−30	29	Relegation to Championship

Rules for classification: 1) Points; 2) Goal difference; 3) Goals scored; 4) Head-to-head points; 5) Head-to-Head goal difference; 6) Play-off (only if deciding champion, UEFA competitions qualification, second stage group allocation or relegation).
(C) Champions; (O) Play-off winners; (R) Relegated

== Results ==
=== Matches 1–22 ===
Teams play each other twice, once at home and once away.

Home \ Away	ABE	CEL	DND	DUN	HOM	HIB	LIV	MOT	RAN	ROS	STJ	STM
Aberdeen	—	1–2	2–1	2–0	2–1	1–0	2–0	0–2	1–1	1–1	0–1	4–1
Celtic	2–1	—	6–0	1–1	1–0	2–0	0–0	1–0	3–0	3–0	2–0	6–0
Dundee	2–1	2–4	—	0–0	0–1	2–2	0–0	3–0	0–1	0–5	1–0	2–2
Dundee United	1–0	0–3	1–0	—	0–2	1–3	0–1	2–1	1–0	1–0	0–1	1–2
Heart of Midlothian	1–1	2–1	1–1	5–2	—	0–0	3–0	2–0	0–2	2–1	2–0	2–0
Hibernian	1–0	1–3	1–0	0–3	0–0	—	2–0	1–1	0–1	3–0	1–0	2–2
Livingston	1–2	1–0	2–0	1–1	0–1	1–0	—	1–2	1–3	1–1	1–2	0–1
Motherwell	2–0	0–2	1–0	1–0	2–0	2–3	2–1	—	1–6	2–1	2–0	2–2
Rangers	2–2	1–0	3–0	1–0	1–1	2–1	3–0	1–1	—	4–2	2–0	2–0
Ross County	1–1	1–2	3–2	1–1	2–2	1–0	2–3	3–1	2–4	—	0–0	2–3
St Johnstone	0–1	1–3	3–1	0–1	1–1	1–2	0–3	1–1	1–2	1–2	—	0–0
St Mirren	3–2	0–0	0–1	0–0	1–2	1–1	1–1	1–1	1–2	0–0	0–0	—

Legend: Blue = home team win; Yellow = draw; Red = away team win.
For upcoming matches, an "a" indicates there is an article about the rivalry between the two participants.

=== Matches 23–33 ===
Teams play each other once, either home or away.

Home \ Away	ABE	CEL	DND	DUN	HOM	HIB	LIV	MOT	RAN	ROS	STJ	STM
Aberdeen	—	2–3	—	1–1	—	3–1	—	—	—	0–1	1–1	—
Celtic	—	—	3–2	1–0	—	—	—	—	—	4–0	7–0	2–0
Dundee	2–2	—	—	—	—	0–0	0–4	—	1–2	1–2	—	0–1
Dundee United	—	—	2–2	—	2–2	—	—	2–0	1–1	2–1	—	—
Heart of Midlothian	2–0	1–2	1–2	—	—	3–1	2–0	2–0	—	—	—	—
Hibernian	—	0–0	—	1–1	—	—	2–3	—	—	2–0	0–0	0–1
Livingston	2–1	1–3	—	2–1	—	—	—	2–2	—	—	—	1–1
Motherwell	1–1	0–4	1–1	—	—	0–0	—	—	—	0–1	—	4–2
Rangers	1–0	1–2	—	—	5–0	2–0	1–0	2–2	—	—	—	—
Ross County	—	—	—	—	1–1	—	1–1	—	3–3	—	3–1	1–0
St Johnstone	—	—	0–0	0–0	2–1	—	1–0	2–1	0–1	—	—	—
St Mirren	1–0	—	—	1–2	0–2	—	—	—	0–4	—	2–1	—

Legend: Blue = home team win; Yellow = draw; Red = away team win.
For upcoming matches, an "a" indicates there is an article about the rivalry between the two participants.

=== Matches 34–38 ===
After 33 matches, the league splits into two sections of six teams i.e. the top six and the bottom six, with the teams playing every other team in their section once (either at home or away). The exact matches are determined by the position of the teams in the league table at the time of the split.

==== Top six ====
Home \ Away	CEL	DUN	HOM	MOT	RAN	ROS
Celtic	—	—	4–1	6–0	1–1	—
Dundee United	1–1	—	2–3	1–0	—	—
Heart of Midlothian	—	—	—	—	1–3	0–0
Motherwell	—	—	2–1	—	1–3	—
Rangers	—	2–0	—	—	—	4–1
Ross County	0–2	1–2	—	0–1	—	—

Legend: Blue = home team win; Yellow = draw; Red = away team win.
For upcoming matches, an "a" indicates there is an article about the rivalry between the two participants.

==== Bottom six ====
Home \ Away	ABE	DND	HIB	LIV	STJ	STM
Aberdeen	—	1–0	—	1–2	—	0–0
Dundee	—	—	3–1	—	1–1	—
Hibernian	1–1	—	—	—	4–0	—
Livingston	—	2–1	1–0	—	1–1	—
St Johnstone	1–0	—	—	—	—	0–1
St Mirren	—	2–0	0–1	0–0	—	—

Legend: Blue = home team win; Yellow = draw; Red = away team win.
For upcoming matches, an "a" indicates there is an article about the rivalry between the two participants.

== Season statistics ==
=== Top scorers ===
Rank	Player	Club	Goals
1	(Greece) Giorgos Giakoumakis	Celtic	13
1	(Grenada) Regan Charles-Cook	Ross County	13
3	(Japan) Kyōgo Furuhashi	Celtic	12
4	(Scotland) Bruce Anderson	Livingston	11
4	(Scotland) Lewis Ferguson	Aberdeen	11
4	(Colombia) Alfredo Morelos	Rangers	11
7	(Israel) Liel Abada	Celtic	10
7	(Northern Ireland) Liam Boyce	Heart of Midlothian	10
7	(Portugal) Jota	Celtic	10
7	(United States) Christian Ramirez	Aberdeen	10
7	(Jamaica) Kemar Roofe	Rangers	10
7	(Scotland) Tony Watt	Motherwell / Dundee United	10

==== Hat-tricks ====
Player	For	Against	Score	Date	Ref.
(Japan) Kyōgo Furuhashi	Celtic	Dundee	6–0 (H)	8 August 2021	
(Scotland) David Turnbull	Celtic	St Mirren	6–0 (H)	21 August 2021	
(Zambia) Fashion Sakala	Rangers	Motherwell	6–1 (A)	31 October 2021	
(Greece) Giorgos Giakoumakis	Celtic	Dundee	3–2 (H)	20 February 2022	
(Greece) Giorgos Giakoumakis	Celtic	Ross County	4–0 (H)	19 March 2022	
(Jamaica) Kemar Roofe	Rangers	St Mirren	4–0 (A)	10 April 2022	
(Scotland) James Scott	Hibernian	St Johnstone	4–0 (H)	15 May 2022	

==== Clean sheets ====
Rank	Player	Club	Clean sheets
1	(England) Joe Hart	Celtic	19
2	(Scotland) Craig Gordon	Heart of Midlothian	14
3	(Scotland) Allan McGregor	Rangers	12
4	(England) Jak Alnwick	St Mirren	11
4	(England) Matt Macey	Hibernian	11
6	(Scotland) Zander Clark	St Johnstone	10
7	(Switzerland) Benjamin Siegrist	Dundee United	9

=== Attendances ===
These are the average attendances of the teams. Games with restricted attendances are not included in these figures.

Pos	Team	Total	High	Low	Average	Change
1	Celtic	1,040,998	59,077	56,052	57,833	−0.2%
2	Rangers	837,477	50,023	47,561	49,263	+0.1%
3	Heart of Midlothian	295,570	19,041	15,527	17,386	+3.8%
4	Hibernian	278,877	20,419	13,227	15,493	−7.4%
5	Aberdeen	219,921	18,719	6,295	12,937	−6.5%
6	Dundee United (Note: Club was playing in the Scottish Championship in the last season with attendances.)	130,017	12,806	4,519	7,648	−10.0%
7	Dundee	114,816	11,273	4,621	6,379	+20.9%
8	Motherwell	96,037	8,446	3,587	5,649	+1.3%
9	St Mirren	88,803	6,596	3,016	4,934	−8.2%
10	St Johnstone	76,558	7,319	2,249	4,503	+10.1%
11	Ross County	72,955	6,698	2,224	4,053	−13.1%
12	Livingston	65,880	8,922	1,319	3,660	+3.3%
	League total	3,317,909	59,077	1,319	15,800	+3.2%

== Awards ==
Month	Manager of the Month		Player of the Month	
Month	Manager	Club	Player	Club
August	(Scotland) Robbie Neilson	Hearts	(Australia) Martin Boyle	Hibernian
September	(Scotland) Graham Alexander	Motherwell	(United States) Ian Harkes	Dundee United
October	(Australia) Ange Postecoglou	Celtic	(Portugal) Jota	Celtic
November	(Scotland) Graham Alexander	Motherwell	(Portugal) Jota	Celtic
December	(Netherlands) Giovanni van Bronckhorst	Rangers	(Colombia) Alfredo Morelos	Rangers
January	(Australia) Ange Postecoglou	Celtic	(Grenada) Regan Charles-Cook	Ross County
February	(Australia) Ange Postecoglou	Celtic	(Scotland) Bruce Anderson	Livingston
March	(Australia) Ange Postecoglou	Celtic	(Greece) Giorgos Giakoumakis	Celtic
April	(Australia) Ange Postecoglou	Celtic	(Portugal) Jota	Celtic

=== Annual awards ===
Award	Winner	Club
Scottich Premiership Player of the Year	(Scotland) Callum McGregor	Celtic
PFA Scotland Premiership Player of the Year	(Scotland) Callum McGregor	Celtic
PFA Scotland SPFL Young Player of the Year	(Israel) Liel Abada	Celtic
PFA Scotland SPFL Manager of the Year	(Australia) Ange Postecoglou	Celtic
PFA Scotland Goal of the Season	(Australia) Tom Rogic	Celtic
SFWA Player of the Year	(Scotland) Craig Gordon	Heart of Midlothian

PFA Scotland Team of the Year
Goalkeeper	(Scotland) Craig Gordon (Heart of Midlothian)			
Defenders	(England) James Tavernier (Rangers)	(United States) Cameron Carter-Vickers (Celtic)	(Croatia) Josip Juranović (Celtic)	(Scotland) John Souttar (Heart of Midlothian)
Midfielders	(Scotland) Tom Rogić (Celtic)		(Scotland) Callum McGregor (Celtic)	(Portugal) Jota (Celtic)
Forwards	(Scotland) Regan Charles-Cook (Ross County)		(Colombia) Alfredo Morelos (Rangers)	(Japan) Kyogo Furuhashi (Celtic)

== Premiership play-offs ==
The quarter-finals were contested by the teams placed third and fourth in the 2021–22 Scottish Championship. The winners advanced to the semi-finals to face the team placed second in the Championship. The final was contested by the semi-final winners and the team placed eleventh in the Premiership, with the winners securing a place in the 2022–23 Scottish Premiership.

=== Qualified teams ===
Team	Rank
St Johnstone	1
Arbroath	2
Inverness Caledonian Thistle	3
Partick Thistle	4

Quarter-final
3	Inverness Caledonian Thistle	2	1	3
4	Partick Thistle	1	0	1

Semi-final
2	Arbroath	0	0	0 (3)
3	Inverness Caledonian Thistle	0	0	0 (5)

Final
1	St Johnstone	2	4	6
3	Inverness Caledonian Thistle	2	0	2

=== Quarter-finals ===
==== First leg ====
3 May 2022	Partick Thistle	1–2	Inverness Caledonian Thistle	Glasgow
19:05	Crawford 54'		Sutherland 71'; Samuels 82'	Stadium: Firhill Stadium; Attendance: 2,919; Referee: Steven McLean

==== Second leg ====
6 May 2022	Inverness Caledonian Thistle	1–0 (3–1 agg.)	Partick Thistle	Inverness
19:45	Samuels 29'			Stadium: Caledonian Stadium; Attendance: 2,470; Referee: Kevin Clancy

=== Semi-finals ===
==== First leg ====
10 May 2022	Inverness Caledonian Thistle	0–0	Arbroath	Inverness
19:05				Stadium: Caledonian Stadium; Attendance: 2,201; Referee: Euan Anderson

==== Second leg ====
13 May 2022	Arbroath	0–0 (0–0 agg.) (3–5 p)	Inverness Caledonian Thistle	Arbroath
19:45				Stadium: Gayfield Park; Attendance: 5,154; Referee: Willie Collum
	Penalties
	McKenna (penalty scored); Low (penalty scored); Hamilton (penalty scored); Linn (penalty missed)		Mckay (penalty scored); Hardy (penalty scored); Welsh (penalty scored); Harper (penalty scored); Broadfoot (penalty scored)

=== Final ===
==== First leg ====
20 May 2022	Inverness Caledonian Thistle	2–2	St Johnstone	Inverness
19:45	McAlear 73', 80'		Rooney 18'; Hallberg 24'	Stadium: Caledonian Stadium; Attendance: 4,811; Referee: Bobby Madden

==== Second leg ====
23 May 2022	St Johnstone	4–0 (6–2 agg.)	Inverness Caledonian Thistle	Perth
19:45	May 46'; MacPherson 53'; Hendry 87'; Rooney 90'			Stadium: McDiarmid Park; Attendance: 7,355; Referee: Nick Walsh

== Broadcasting ==
=== Live matches (UK and Ireland) ===
Sky Sports had exclusive rights to the Scottish Premiership, showing up to 48 matches and the Premiership play-off final. BBC Scotland broadcast the Premiership quarter-final and semi-final play-off ties.

Due to the impact of the COVID-19 pandemic, clubs continued to stream matches (not broadcast on Sky) to fans on a pay-per-view or "virtual season ticket" basis, whilst capacities in stadia were limited due to social distancing restrictions.

=== Highlights ===
Highlights were broadcast on BBC Scotland's flagship Sportscene programme on both Saturdays and Sundays. Sky Sports also showed highlights.

Gaelic-language channel BBC Alba had rights to broadcast repeats in full of 38 Saturday 15:00 matches "as live" at 17:30.

The SPFL also uploaded the goals from every Premiership match onto its YouTube channel.
