= 2021–22 Inverness Caledonian Thistle F.C. season =

Scottish football club season

Inverness Caledonian Thistle
2021–22 season
- Chairman: Ross Morrison
- Manager: Billy Dodds
- Stadium: Caledonian Stadium
- Scottish Championship: 3rd; lost play-off Final 6–2 on Aggregate to St. Johnstone
- Scottish Cup: Third Round Replay; lost 5–4 on Penalties to Greenock Morton
- League Cup: Group Stage
- Challenge Cup: Quarter Finals; lost 5–4 on Penalties to Raith Rovers
- Top goalscorer: League: Shane Sutherland: 10; All: Billy Mckay: 15
- Highest home attendance: 4,811; vs St. Johnstone, 20 May 2022
- Lowest home attendance: 478; vs Raith Rovers, 8 January 2022
Home colours	Away colours	Third colours

The 2021-22 Inverness Caledonian Thistle season is the club's 28th campaign, and their fifth consecutive season in the Championship - the second-tier of Scottish football.

== Events ==
=== Pre-season ===
1 June 2021: Billy Dodds is named as the team's new manager, resulting in mixed reception from fans.

== Fixtures and results ==
=== Friendlies ===
23 June 2021 Friendly	Clachnacuddin	0 – 5	Inverness Caledonian Thistle	Inverness
19:30				Stadium: Grant Street Park

26 June 2021 Friendly	Forres Mechanics	0 – 1	Inverness Caledonian Thistle	Forres
15:00				Stadium: Mosset Park

8 July 2021 Friendly	Aberdeen	1 – 1	Inverness Caledonian Thistle	Aberdeen
13:00				Stadium: Cormack Park

=== League ===
31 July 2021 Scottish Championship	Arbroath	0 – 1	Inverness Caledonian Thistle	Arbroath
15:00			Sutherland 66'	Stadium: Gayfield Park; Attendance: 1,008

7 August 2021 Scottish Championship	Inverness Caledonian Thistle	1 – 0	Raith Rovers	Inverness
15:00	MacGregor 80'			Stadium: Caledonian Stadium; Attendance: 1,675

21 August 2021 Scottish Championship	Inverness Caledonian Thistle	1 – 0	Ayr United	Inverness
15:00	Walsh 54'			Stadium: Caledonian Stadium; Attendance: 2,032

28 August 2021 Scottish Championship	Kilmarnock	0 – 1	Inverness Caledonian Thistle	Kilmarnock
15:00			Gardyne 5'	Stadium: Rugby Park; Attendance: 5,004

11 September 2021 Scottish Championship	Inverness Caledonian Thistle	3 – 1	Partick Thistle	Inverness
15:00	Broadfoot 51', Sutherland 68', Doran 71'		Tiffoney 17'	Stadium: Caledonian Stadium; Attendance: 2,148

18 September 2021 Scottish Championship	Dunfermline Athletic	0 – 0	Inverness Caledonian Thistle	Dunfermline
15:00				Stadium: East End Park; Attendance: 3,158

25 September 2021 Scottish Championship	Inverness Caledonian Thistle	2 – 1	Queen of the South	Inverness
15:00	Welsh 12', Gardyne 81'		Connelly 74'	Stadium: Caledonian Stadium; Attendance: 1,884

2 October 2021 Scottish Championship	Hamilton Academical	2 – 1	Inverness Caledonian Thistle	Hamilton
15:00	Smith 5', Ryan 26', Mimnaugh (yellow card) 30' (yellow-red card)		Gardyne 90'	Stadium: Fountain of Youth Stadium; Attendance: 1,088

16 October 2021 Scottish Championship	Inverness Caledonian Thistle	2 – 0	Greenock Morton	Inverness
15:00	Mckay 20', Gardyne 49'			Stadium: Caledonian Stadium; Attendance: 1,900

23 October 2021 Scottish Championship	Raith Rovers	1 – 1	Inverness Caledonian Thistle	Kirkcaldy
15:00	Matthews (red card) 45', Connolly 62'		Welsh 79'	Stadium: Stark's Park; Attendance: 1,900

26 October 2021 Scottish Championship	Inverness Caledonian Thistle	0 – 1	Arbroath	Inverness
19:45			McKenna 54'	Stadium: Caledonian Stadium; Attendance: 1,900

30 October 2021 Scottish Championship	Partick Thistle	0 – 0	Inverness Caledonian Thistle	Maryhill
15:00				Stadium: Firhill Stadium; Attendance: 2,527

6 November 2021 Scottish Championship	Ayr United	2 – 2	Inverness Caledonian Thistle	Ayr
15:00	Chalmers 15', Reading 53'		Welsh 13', Gardyne 26'	Stadium: Somerset Park; Attendance: 1,289

13 November 2021 Scottish Championship	Inverness Caledonian Thistle	1 – 2	Dunfermline Athletic	Inverness
15:00	Mckay 22'		Devine (o.g.) 51', Thomas 64'	Stadium: Caledonian Stadium; Attendance: 2,111

19 November 2021 Scottish Championship	Queen of the South	1 – 2	Inverness Caledonian Thistle	Dumfries
19:45	Connelly 75'		Mckay (pen.), 19', 50'	Stadium: Palmerston Park; Attendance: 942

3 December 2021 Scottish Championship	Inverness Caledonian Thistle	1 – 0	Kilmarnock	Inverness
19:45	Welsh 69'			Stadium: Caledonian Stadium; Attendance: 2,296

11 December 2021 Scottish Championship	Greenock Morton	1 – 6	Inverness Caledonian Thistle	Greenock
15:00	Ugwu (pen.), 45+1'		Hamilton (o.g.) 15', Sutherland 33', 60', Mckay 43', McAlear 51', Jamieson 78'	Stadium: Cappielow; Attendance: 1,192

18 December 2021 Scottish Championship	Inverness Caledonian Thistle	1 – 2	Hamilton Academical	Inverness
15:00	Harper 65'		Moyo 79', Winter 82'	Stadium: Caledonian Stadium; Attendance: 1,862

2 January 2022 Scottish Championship	Arbroath	0 – 0	Inverness Caledonian Thistle	Arbroath
15:00				Stadium: Gayfield Park; Attendance: 494

8 January 2022 Scottish Championship	Inverness Caledonian Thistle	1 – 1	Raith Rovers	Inverness
15:00	McAlear 86'		Ross 24'	Stadium: Caledonian Stadium; Attendance: 478

15 January 2022 Scottish Championship	Inverness Caledonian Thistle	2 – 2	Queen of the South	Inverness
15:00	Mckay 62', Walsh 73'		Connelly 39', Roy 77'	Stadium: Caledonian Stadium; Attendance: 479

22 January 2022 Scottish Championship	Dunfermline Athletic	1 – 1	Inverness Caledonian Thistle	Dunfermline
15:00	Lawless (pen.), 80'		Sutherland 39'	Stadium: East End Park; Attendance: 3,138

29 January 2022 Scottish Championship	Kilmarnock	1 – 0	Inverness Caledonian Thistle	Kilmarnock
15:00	Lafferty 9'			Stadium: Rugby Park; Attendance: 4,790

5 February 2022 Scottish Championship	Inverness Caledonian Thistle	0 – 1	Greenock Morton	Inverness
15:00			Strapp 24'	Stadium: Caledonian Stadium; Attendance: 1,808

9 February 2022 Scottish Championship]]	Inverness Caledonian Thistle	3 – 3	Partick Thistle	Inverness
19:45	McKay 21', Sutherland 45+1' Broadfoot 90+4'		Graham 8', 27', (pen.), 72'	Stadium: Caledonian Stadium; Attendance: 1,781

19 February 2022 Scottish Championship	Inverness Caledonian Thistle	1 – 2	Ayr United	Inverness
15:00	Carson (yellow card) 68' (yellow-red card) , Nicholson 86'		McGinty 35', Adeloye 64'	Stadium: Caledonian Stadium; Attendance: 1,850

25 February 2022 Scottish Championship	Hamilton Academical	1 – 1	Inverness Caledonian Thistle	Hamilton
19:45	Mullin 13'		Pearson 30'	Stadium: New Douglas Park; Attendance: 1,187

4 March 2022 Scottish Championship	Partick Thistle	1 – 0	Inverness Caledonian Thistle	Partick
19:45	Holt 85'			Stadium: Firhill Stadium; Attendance: 2,099

12 March 2022 Scottish Championship	Inverness Caledonian Thistle	3 – 0	Arbroath	Inverness
15:00	Sutherland 5', McAlear 11', McKay 68'			Stadium: Caledonian Stadium; Attendance: 2,149

19 March 2022 Scottish Championship	Raith Rovers	2 – 3	Inverness Caledonian Thistle	Kirkcaldy
15:00	Connolly 13', Poplatnik 30', Benedictus (red card) 71' Williamson (yellow card) 90+4' (yellow-red card)		Sutherland 27', Chalmers 89', 90+2'	Stadium: Stark's Park; Attendance: 1,591

26 March 2022 Scottish Championship	Inverness Caledonian Thistle	2 – 0	Dunfermline Athletic	Inverness
15:00	McAlear 58', Samuels 77'			Stadium: Caledonian Stadium; Attendance: 2,171

9 April 2022 Scottish Championship	Ayr United	2 – 2	Inverness Caledonian Thistle	Ayr
15:00	Bryden 54', Fjørtoft 76'		Sutherland 6', Chalmers 13'	Stadium: Somerset Park; Attendance: 1,756

15 April 2022 Scottish Championship	Inverness Caledonian Thistle	2 – 1	Kilmarnock	Inverness
19:45	Mckay 76', Chalmers 82'		Taylor 60'	Stadium: Caledonian Stadium

19 April 2022 Scottish Championship	Queen of the South	2 – 1	Inverness Caledonian Thistle	Dumfries
19:45	Todd 6', East 40'		Chalmers 17'	Stadium: Palmerston Park

23 April 2022 Scottish Championship	Greenock Morton	0 – 1	Inverness Caledonian Thistle	Greenock
15:00			MacGregor 29'	Stadium: Cappielow Park

29 April 2022	Inverness Caledonian Thistle	4 – 0	Hamilton Academical	Inverness
15:00	Walsh 4', 22', Sutherland 15', Hardy 28'			Stadium: Caledonian Stadium

=== Scottish Premiership play-offs ===
3 May 2022 Scottish Premiership play-off Quarter Final First Leg	Partick Thistle	1 – 2	Inverness Caledonian Thistle	Partick
19:45	Crawford 54'		Sutherland 71', Samuels 82'	Stadium: Firhill Stadium

6 May 2022 Scottish Premiership play-offs Quarter Final Second Leg	Inverness Caledonian Thistle	1 – 0 (3 – 1 agg.)	Partick Thistle	Inverness
19:45	Samuels 29'			Stadium: Caledonian Stadium
Note: Inverness CT progress to the semi Final

10 May 2022 Scottish Premiership play-off Semi Final First Leg	Inverness Caledonian Thistle	0 – 0	Arbroath	Inverness
19:45				Stadium: Caledonian Stadium

13 May 2022 Scottish Premiership play-off Semi Final Second Leg	Arbroath	0 – 0 (a.e.t.) (0 – 0 agg.) (3 – 5 p)	Inverness Caledonian Thistle	Arbroath
19:45			Devine (red card) 66', Duffy (yellow card) 113' (yellow-red card)	Stadium: Gayfield Park
	Penalties
	McKenna (penalty scored) , Low (penalty scored) , Hamilton (penalty scored) , Linn (penalty missed)		(penalty scored) Mckay, (penalty scored) Hardy, (penalty scored) Welsh, (penalty scored) Harper, (penalty scored) Broadfoot
Note: Inverness CT progress to the final

20 May 2022 Scottish Premiership play-off Final First Leg	Inverness Caledonian Thistle	2 – 2	St Johnstone	Inverness
19:45	McAlear 73', 80'		Rooney 18', Hallberg 24'	Stadium: Caledonian Stadium

23 May 2022 Scottish Premiership play-off Final Second Leg	St Johnstone	4 – 0 (6 – 2 agg.)	Inverness Caledonian Thistle	Perth
19:45	May 46', MacPherson 53', Hendry 87', Rooney 90'			Stadium: McDiarmid Park

=== Scottish Cup ===
27 November 2021 Scottish Cup Third Round	Inverness Caledonian Thistle	1 – 1	Greenock Morton	Inverness
15:00	Mckay 12'		Reilly 81'	Stadium: Caledonian Stadium

7 December 2021 Scottish Cup Third Round Replay	Greenock Morton	1 – 1 (5 – 4 p)	Inverness Caledonian Thistle	Greenock
19:45	Muirhead 42'		Devine 47'	Stadium: Cappielow
	Penalties
	Reilly (penalty scored) Lyon (penalty scored); Ugwu (penalty scored); Muirhead (penalty scored) Oliver (penalty scored)		(penalty scored) Doran (penalty scored) McAlear; (penalty scored) Allardice; (penalty scored) Jamieson (penalty missed) Devine

=== League Cup ===
The Group Stage for the cup was drawn on 28 May 2021, with Cove Rangers, Heart of Midlothian, Inverness, Peterhead and Stirling Albion being drawn into Group A. The first match will be played on 13 July 2021.

13 July 2021 Group A	Inverness Caledonian Thistle	2 – 0	Peterhead	Inverness
19:45	Duku 50', Doran 54'			Stadium: Caledonian Stadium

17 July 2021 Group A	Inverness Caledonian Thistle	2 – 2 (2 – 3 p)	Stirling Albion	Inverness
15:00	MacGregor 27', Sutherland 49'		Mackin 4', Moore 20'	Stadium: Caledonian Stadium
	Penalties
	Walsh (penalty missed) Allardice (penalty scored); McAlear (penalty scored); Carson (penalty missed) Sutherland (penalty missed)		(penalty scored) Carrick (penalty missed) Leitch; (penalty scored) Flanagan; (penalty scored) Omar (penalty missed) Banner

20 July 2021 Group A	Cove Rangers	3 – 1	Inverness Caledonian Thistle	Aberdeen
19:45	McIntosh 35', Megginson 38', Yule 85'		Duku (pen.), 90'	Stadium: Balmoral Stadium

25 July 2021 Group A	Heart of Midlothian	1 – 0	Inverness Caledonian Thistle	Edinburgh
17:15	Walker 75'		Gardyne (red card) 88'	Stadium: Tynecastle Park
Note: Live on Premier Sports

=== SPFL Trust Challenge Cup ===
Inverness are due to enter the Challenge Cup at Round 2 which will be played on the 4th and 5 September.

4 September 2021 SPFL Trust Trophy Round 2	Inverness Caledonian Thistle	4 – 0	Buckie Thistle	Inverness
15:00	Jamieson 24', Harper 67', Mckay 81', 90'			Stadium: Caledonian Stadium

9 October 2021 SPFL Trust Trophy Round 3	Elgin City	2 – 4	Inverness Caledonian Thistle	Elgin
14:00	Grivosti 9', Cameron 22'		Mckay 38', 40', 68', Jamieson 72'	Stadium: Borough Briggs

30 November 2021 SPFL Trust Trophy Quarter Final	Inverness Caledonian Thistle	0 – 0 (4 – 5 p)	Raith Rovers	Inverness
19:45				Stadium: Caledonian Stadium
	Penalties
	Doran (penalty scored) Harper (penalty scored); Deas (penalty missed); Jamieson (penalty scored); Allardice (penalty scored) Sutherland (penalty missed)		(penalty scored) Tait (penalty scored) Berra; (penalty missed) Matthews; (penalty scored) Varian; (penalty scored) Connolly (penalty scored) Dick

=== North of Scotland Cup ===
Did not enter.

== Team statistics ==
=== League table ===
Pos	Team	Pld	W	D	L	GF	GA	GD	Pts	Promotion, qualification or relegation
1	Kilmarnock (C, P)	36	20	7	9	50	27	+23	67	Promotion to the Premiership
2	Arbroath	36	17	14	5	54	28	+26	65	Qualification for the Premiership play-off semi-final
3	Inverness Caledonian Thistle	36	16	11	9	53	34	+19	59	Qualification for the Premiership play-off quarter-final
4	Partick Thistle	36	14	10	12	46	40	+6	52	Qualification for the Premiership play-off quarter-final
5	Raith Rovers	36	12	14	10	44	44	0	50	

Rules for classification: 1) Points; 2) Goal difference; 3) Goals scored; 4) Head-to-to head points; 5) Head-to-head goal difference; 6) Play-off (only for deciding promotion, play-off participation and relegation).
(C) Champions; (P) Promoted

== First Team Player Statistics ==
=== League Goalscorers ===
Rank	Player	Goals
1st	(Scotland) Shane Sutherland	10
2nd	(Northern Ireland) Billy Mckay	9
3rd	(Scotland) Michael Gardyne	5
3rd	(Scotland) Logan Chalmers	5
5th	(Scotland) Reece McAlear	4
5th	(Scotland) Sean Welsh	4
5th	(Scotland) Tom Walsh	4
8th	(Scotland) Kirk Broadfoot	2
8th	(Scotland) Roddy MacGregor	2
10th	(Republic of Ireland) Aaron Doran	1
10th	(Scotland) Cameron Harper	1
10th	(Scotland) Lewis Jamieson	1
10th	(England) Joe Hardy	1
10th	(Scotland) Lewis Nicolson	1
10th	(Wales) Sam Pearson	1
10th	(England) Austin Samuels	1

=== Overall Goalscorers ===
Rank	Player	Goals
1st	(Northern Ireland) Billy Mckay	15
2nd	(Scotland) Shane Sutherland	12
3rd	(Scotland) Reece McAlear	6
4th	(Scotland) Michael Gardyne	5
4th	(Scotland) Logan Chalmers	5
6th	Sean Welsh	4
6th	Tom Walsh	4
8th	(Scotland) Lewis Jamieson	3
8th	(Scotland) Roddy MacGregor	3
8th	(England) Austin Samuels	3
11th	(Republic of Ireland) Aaron Doran	2
11th	(Netherlands) Manny Duku	2
11th	Cameron Harper	2
11th	Kirk Broadfoot	2
15th	(Northern Ireland) Danny Devine	1
15th	(England) Joe Hardy	1
15th	(Scotland) Lewis Nicolson	1
15th	(Wales) Sam Pearson	1

*as of match played 23 May 2022

**players in italics left the club during the season.

=== Hat-tricks ===
Player	Competition	Score	Opponent	Date
(Northern Ireland) Billy Mckay	SPFL Trust Trophy	2–4	Elgin City	9 October 2021

=== Transfers ===
Transfers In
Player	Age*	Pos	From	Fee	Date	Notes
(Scotland) Michael Gardyne	35	MF	(Scotland) Ross County	Free	1 July 2021	
(Scotland) Tom Walsh	24	MF	(Scotland) Ayr United	Free	1 July 2021	
(Netherlands) Manny Duku	28	FW	(Scotland) Raith Rovers	Free	1 July 2021	
(Northern Ireland) Billy Mckay	32	FW	(Scotland) Ross County	Free	1 July 2021	
(Scotland) Kirk Broadfoot	36	DF	(Scotland) Kilmarnock	Free	12 July 2021	
(England) Austin Samuels	21	FW	(England) Wolverhampton Wanderers	Undisclosed	28 January 2022	

Transfers Out
Player	Age*	Pos	To	Fee	Date	Notes
(Scotland) James Keatings	29	FW	(Scotland) Raith Rovers	Pre-Contract Agreement	3 March 2021	
(Scotland) Daniel MacKay	20	FW	(Scotland) Hibernian	Undisclosed	13 May 2021	
(Scotland) Brad McKay	28	DF	(Scotland) Falkirk	Free	1 July 2021	
(Bulgaria) Nikolay Todorov	24	FW	(Scotland) Dunfermline Athletic	Free	1 July 2021	
(England) Miles Storey	27	FW	(England) Hereford	Free	1 July 2021	
(England) James Vincent	31	MF	(England) Hereford	Free	1 July 2021	
(Scotland) Lewis Toshney	29	DF	Retired	N/A	3 July 2021	
(Scotland) Shane Harkness	20	MF	(Scotland) Rothes	Free	January 2022	
(Scotland) Michael Gardyne	36	FW	(Scotland) Montrose	Contract Terminated	January 2022	
(Scotland) Anthony McDonald	20	MF	(Scotland) Edinburgh City	Free	January 2022	
(Netherlands) Manny Duku	29	FW	(England) Havant & Waterlooville	Free	January 2022	

Loans In/Return
Player	Age*	Pos	From	Duration	Date In	Date Out	Notes
(Scotland) Lewis Jamieson	19	FW	(Scotland) St Mirren	Full Season	1 July 2021	25 January 2022	
(Scotland) Reece McAlear	19	MF	(England) Norwich City	Full Season	1 July 2021	1 July 2022	
(Scotland) Logan Chalmers	21	FW	(Scotland) Dundee United	Half Season	21 January 2022	1 July 2022	
(Wales) Sam Pearson	20	FW	(England) Bristol City	Half Season	21 January 2022	1 July 2022	
(England) Joe Hardy	23	FW	(England) Accrington Stanley	Half Season	27 January 2022	1 July 2022	

Loans Out/Return
Player	Age*	Pos	To	Duration	Date Out	Date In	Notes
(Scotland) Arron Lyall	17	MF	(Scotland) Rangers	Return	1 July 2021	N/A	
(Scotland) Scott Allan	29	MF	(Scotland) Hibernian	Return	1 July 2021	N/A	
(Scotland) Lewis Jamieson	19	FW	(Scotland) St Mirren	Recalled	25 January 2022	N/A	
(Wales) Sam Pearson	20	FW	(England) Bristol City	Mutually Terminated	1 April 2022	N/A	Mutually terminated due to Family Bereavment

*at time of transfer/loan
