= Daniel Hoban =

Scottish footballer

Personal information
- Date of birth: 5 April 1998 (age 28)
- Place of birth: Inverness, Scotland
- Height: 1.83 m (6 ft 0 in)
- Position: Goalkeeper

Team information
- Current team: Banks o' Dee

Youth career
- 2008–2016: Inverness Caledonian Thistle

Senior career*
| Years | Team | Apps | (Gls) |
| 2016–2020 | Inverness Caledonian Thistle | 0 | (0) |
| 2016 | → Strathspey Thistle (loan) | | |
| 2017–2018 | → Brora Rangers (loan) | 0 | (0) |
| 2018 | → Nairn County (loan) | 7 | (0) |
| 2019 | → Forfar Athletic (loan) | 0 | (0) |
| 2019–2020 | → Elgin City (loan) | 0 | (0) |
| 2020 | → Fort William (loan) | | |
| 2020–2021 | Forfar Athletic | 4 | (0) |
| 2021–2023 | Elgin City | 32 | (0) |
| 2023– | Banks o' Dee | 3 | (0) |
- * Club domestic league appearances and goals as of 28 December 2024

Daniel Hoban (born 5 April 1998) is a Scottish footballer who plays as a goalkeeper for Highland League club Banks o' Dee.

== Career ==
A native of Inverness, Scotland, Hoban grew up as an Inverness Caledonian Thistle fan and joined the club's youth ranks. He was named on the bench for the senior team for a match against Hamilton Academical in November 2014, before going out on loan to Highland League club Strathspey Thistle in 2016. Loan spells to fellow Highland League clubs Brora Rangers, Nairn County, and Fort William would follow over the next four years, as well as stints at Scottish Professional Football League clubs Elgin City and Forfar Athletic.

In between loan spells, Hoban made his professional debut for Inverness, starting against Dunfermline Athletic on 14 August 2018 in the first round of the Scottish Challenge Cup. He conceded twice, with one coming from the penalty spot, in a 2–1 defeat for Inverness. Hoban also appeared that season in the North of Scotland Cup and was the losing goalkeeper in a final defeat against Ross County.

In June 2020, Hoban was released by Inverness after 12 years at the club. He, along with the rest of the playing squad, had been placed on furlough at the beginning of the COVID-19 pandemic in a bid for the survival of the club, in conjunction with the cancellation of the 2019–20 Scottish Championship season.

After his release from Inverness, Hoban secured a move back to Forfar Athletic on 11 July 2020, signing a one-year contract with the Scottish League One club. Along with his playing career, he entered into a sport management degree at Abertay University.

In May 2021, Hoban rejoined Scottish League Two side Elgin City on a one-year deal.

In September 2023, Daniel was transferred to Highland football league side Banks o' Dee from Elgin City.
