= 2018–19 Inverness Caledonian Thistle F.C. season =

Scottish football club season

Inverness Caledonian Thistle
2018–19 season
- Chairman: Graham Rae
- Manager: John Robertson
- Stadium: Caledonian Stadium
- Championship: 3rd
- Premiership play-offs: Semi-finals lost 4–0 on aggregate vs. Dundee United
- Scottish Cup: Semi-finals lost 3–0 vs. Heart of Midlothian
- League Cup: Group stage
- Challenge Cup: First round lost 1–2 vs. Dunfermline Athletic
- Top goalscorer: League: Jordan White (7); All: Jordan White (16)
- Highest home attendance: 4,353; vs. Ross County (3 November 2018)
- Lowest home attendance: 672; vs. Edinburgh City (4 December 2018)
Home colours	Away colours	Third colours

The 2018–19 Inverness Caledonian Thistle F.C. season is the club's second season in the Scottish Championship, having been relegated from the Scottish Premiership at the end of the 2016–17 season. Caley Thistle will also compete in the Scottish Challenge Cup, Scottish League Cup and the Scottish Cup. This season will be the 25th season since Inverness joined the Scottish Football League. This season is also the return of the Highland derby after Ross County were relegated one season after Inverness.

== Events ==
=== May 2018 ===
- 14 May 2018: 10 Youth Team players, dubbed "Class of 2018" as a reference to Fergie's Fledglings which were dubbed "Class of '92", are called up into the first team.

=== June 2018 ===
- 18 June 2018: ICT win the SFA U17 League, winning 22 of 24 and scoring 104 goals along the way.

=== July 2018 ===
- 3 July 2018: The longest serving player in ICTFC history, Ross Tokely, returns to the club as the youth coach.
- 7 July 2018: Carl Tremarco is made team captain after Gary Warren's exit to Yeovil Town.
- 13 July 2018: Inverness install a new ticket system, which replaces the old tear stub tickets with barcoded tickets.
- 22 July 2018: #biggesthomegame returns for the second consecutive year, with the game ending with a 25–25 tie, which was a massive improvement from the previous season where they were beaten by the 100 kids 20–5.

=== August 2018 ===
- 8 August 2018: ICT announce that goalkeeper, Ryan Esson, will receive a testimonial match as recognition for his 10-year career with the Caley Jags.
- 10 August 2018: Former player and first captain of ICTFC, Alan Hercher, dies aged 52.
- 11 August 2018: A minutes silence is held for Alan Hercher ahead of Inverness' 0–0 draw with Ayr United, a minutes silence is also held at Clachnacuddin, where Alan was also a player, ahead of their 1–0 win over Lossiemouth.
- 12 August 2018: Inverness open investigations on some of their home support after abuse was hurled towards Liam Polworth and his family, mainly his sister at Saturday's home game.
- 13 August 2018: Inverness issue a Club Statement, saying "Inverness Caledonian Thistle were saddened and angered to learn of sustained verbal abuse directed at one of our players and his family by a small minority of supporters during Saturday's match with Ayr United...Individuals who were involved in this abuse have been identified, and are in the process of being banned from attending future Inverness Caledonian Thistle fixtures." It is currently unknown how long the bans are to be served, but is speculated that it is likely to be a Rest of Season ban from the ground or any ground hosting an ICT fixture.
- 14 August 2018: Defending champions Inverness tumble out of the Scottish Challenge Cup in a first round home fixture vs Dunfermline Athletic, which was a game that was criticized by many fans and some media after Dunfermline Athletic were awarded a penalty despite the foul taking place at least a yard outside the box.
- 22 August 2018: Inverness progress to the semi-finals of the North of Scotland Cup, after a 6–0 win over Lossiemouth.
- 23 August 2018: Inverness draft in their first ever Brazilian player, youngster Machado Matheus, on a 2-year contract, from Red Bull Brasil.
- 23 August 2018: Club site (ictfc.com), unexpectedly goes down for host migration, with no prior warning, much to fans annoyance.

=== September 2018 ===
- 11 September 2018: Former Caledonian manager, Alex Main, dies aged 86
- 11 September 2018: Inverness secure their North of Scotland cup final after a 4–0 victory over the Can-cans of Forres. They will play local rivals Ross County in the 7 October final at Clachnacuddin's Grant Street Park.
- 15 September 2018: Inverness go top of the Championship after a 3–2 win over Partick Thistle, continuing their streak of 17 league games unbeaten, which started in March of the previous season.
- 22 September 2018: Inverness drop to 2nd in the Championship after a 0–0 draw with Ross County, with County dropping to 4th place.
- 29 September 2018: Inverness fall further after a second consecutive 0–0 draw, however extending their unbeaten streak to 18 games.

=== October 2018 ===
- 6 October 2018: Inverness retain their unbeaten streak at 19 games, after a draw with Greenock Morton at home which ended one a piece.
- 7 October 2018: Inverness CT lose 3–2 to rivals Ross County in the North of Scotland Cup final at Grant Street Park.
- 30 October 2018: Inverness equalize their 21-year-old record of 22 games unbeaten after a 2–2 draw with Dunfermline Athletic.

=== November 2018 ===
- 3 November 2018: Inverness extend their record with a 2–2 draw with Ross County.
- 8 November 2018: Riccardo Calder is kicked out of the club after being found guilty of assault in Birmingham after the end of the previous season.

=== December 2018 ===
- 1 December 2018: Inverness's 25-game unbeaten streak comes to an abrupt halt after a 3–2 loss to Falkirk at home.
- 4 December 2018: Inverness thrash Edinburgh City 6–1 in the Scottish Cup Third round.

=== January 2019 ===
- 28 January 2019: Youngster Daniel MacKay is called up to the Scotland national under-19 football team. The first to receive a call up to any Scotland squad since Andrew Shinnie in 2012.

=== February 2019 ===
- 1 February 2019: Tulloch gift the stadium to the club, giving the club full ownership of the plot.
- 7 February 2019: Inverness take Inverness City's women's team under their wing and rebrand them as ICT WFC.
- 19 February 2019: Inverness progress to the quarter-finals of the Scottish Cup after beating Ross County 5 – 4 on the first penalty shootout outside the finals since 1990.

=== March 2019 ===
- 3 March 2019: Inverness progress to the semi-finals of the Scottish Cup after an injury time winner from Aaron Doran in a 2–1 victory at Tannadice Park.

=== April 2019 ===
- 4 April 2019: John Robertson and Aaron Doran are named March's Scottish Championship Manager and Player of the Month respectively.
- 5 April 2019: Summer signing Angus Beith is forced to retire due to a long-standing hip injury that has prevented him from playing. A benefit match for him is to be played between Inverness and his previous side Heart of Midlothian.
- 13 April 2019: Inverness fail to beat Heart of Midlothian, and succumb to a 3–0 defeat, however, it did not go without controversy, as a would be equaliser from Jamie McCart was ruled out for offside, despite it being played back onside by ex-Inverness and Hearts Midfielder, Jake Mulraney.
- 20 April 2019: In a push for the Premiership play-offs, Inverness falter against Dundee United, which delay rivals, Ross County's title celebrations. By sheer luck, despite the loss, they still secured their playoff spot, as Dunfermline, who trailed by 9 points with three games to play, failed to break Queen of the South. Had both Inverness and Dunfermline won their games and the won their following game, it would come down to the final day, as Inverness would host Dunfermline in the final clash of the season. United on the other hand, have to hope Ross County lose both of their final games, and that they win both of their final games, as it boils down to a 6-point difference between the two teams, however, it would play in Ross County's favour through goal difference, as United would have to score a minimum of 18 goals to take them to a level goal difference.

== Summary ==
=== Management ===
John Robertson will return to the club for his second season after a close finish to the previous season, by missing out on playoffs by only two points.

== Fixtures and results ==
Fixtures will be announced by the SPFL in June 2018.

=== Friendlies ===
*Note: Games played on the same day and same time are played with two different squads led by two different managers. Fixtures are being played on the same day as to avoid preseason friendlies leaking into time taken up by the League Cup Group Stage.

30 June 2018 Friendly	Strathspey Thistle	0–5	Inverness Caledonian Thistle	Fort George
14:00			MacKay 2', 30', 61' Polworth 75' Oakley 82'	Stadium: Fort George Training Pitch

30 June 2018 Friendly	Keith	0–5	Inverness Caledonian Thistle	Keith
14:00			Trafford 19' Elbouzedi 26', 87' Morrison 74' Austin 80'	Stadium: Kynoch Park

3 July 2018 Friendly	Forres Mechanics	2–4	Inverness Caledonian Thistle	Forres
19:45	Fraser 36' Macrae 54'		White 26', 50', 57' McCart 34'	Stadium: Mosset Park

3 July 2018 Friendly	Rothes	2–2	Inverness Caledonian Thistle	Rothes
19:45			Nelson Oakley	Stadium: Mackessak Park

6 July 2018 Friendly	Nairn County	1–1	Inverness Caledonian Thistle	Nairn
19:30	Ewan		Oakley	Stadium: Station Park

7 July 2018 Friendly	Clachnacuddin	1–3	Inverness Caledonian Thistle	Inverness
14:00	Beeston		Austin, MacKay	Stadium: Grant Street Park

10 July 2018 Friendly	Buckie Thistle	0–8	Inverness Caledonian Thistle	Buckie
19:45			Walsh,,, Brown, Wilson Kennedy	Stadium: Victoria Park

11 July 2018 Friendly	Inverness Caledonian Thistle	CANCELLED	Aberdeen	Inverness
19:30		Report		Stadium: Caledonian Stadium
Note: Game cancelled by Aberdeen due to lack of fit players after their friendly on 8 July.

18 July 2018 Friendly	Brora Rangers	1–3	Inverness Caledonian Thistle	Brora
19:45	MacLeod		Welsh, (red card) McCart	Stadium: Dudgeon Park

=== League ===
SPFL fixtures were announced at 9:00am GMT on Friday, 15 June 2018, and are subject to change.

4 August 2018 Championship	Falkirk	0–1	Inverness Caledonian Thistle	Falkirk
15:00		Report	Oakley 10'	Stadium: Falkirk Stadium; Attendance: 4,583; Referee: McLean

11 August 2018 Championship	Inverness Caledonian Thistle	0–0	Ayr United	Inverness
15:00		Report	Harvie (yellow card) 30' (yellow-red card)	Stadium: Caledonian Stadium; Attendance: 2,376; Referee: Andrew Dallas

25 August 2018 Championship	Inverness Caledonian Thistle	2–2	Alloa Athletic	Inverness
15:00	McKay 10' Welsh (penalty scored)	Report	Graham 35', Karadachki (yellow card) 48' (yellow-red card) Flannigan (penalty scored)	Stadium: Tulloch Caledonian Stadium; Attendance: 2,269; Referee: Cook

1 September 2018 Championship	Dunfermline Athletic	0–3	Inverness Caledonian Thistle	Dunfermline
15:00			Rooney 51' Polworth 72' Oakley 83'	Stadium: East End Park; Attendance: 5,138; Referee: Robertson

15 September 2018 Championship	Inverness Caledonian Thistle	3–2	Partick Thistle	Inverness
15:00	White 11', Rooney 23', Welsh (penalty scored)	Report	Spittal 82', Doolan 90+3'	Stadium: Caledonian Stadium; Attendance: 2,424; Referee: Greg Aitken

22 September 2018 Championship	Ross County	0–0	Inverness Caledonian Thistle	Dingwall
15:00		Report		Stadium: Victoria Park; Attendance: 6,402; Referee: Willie Collum
Note: Highland derby

29 September 2018 Championship	Inverness Caledonian Thistle	0–0	Queen of the South	Inverness
15:00		Report		Stadium: Caledonian Stadium; Attendance: 2,029; Referee: Alan Muir

6 October 2018 Championship	Inverness Caledonian Thistle	1–1	Greenock Morton	Inverness
15:00	White 45'	Report	Telfer 10'	Stadium: Tulloch Caledonian Stadium; Attendance: 2,186; Referee: Craig Thompson

20 October 2018 Championship	Dundee United	1–1	Inverness Caledonian Thistle	Dundee
15:00	Safranko 55'	Report	White 72' Donaldson (yellow card) 82' (yellow-red card)	Stadium: Tannadice Stadium; Attendance: 5,628; Referee: Anderson

27 October 2018 Championship	Alloa Athletic	0–0	Inverness Caledonian Thistle	Alloa
15:00				Stadium: Recreation Park; Attendance: 644; Referee: Roncone

30 October 2018 Championship	Inverness Caledonian Thistle	2–2	Dunfermline Athletic	Inverness
19:45	Calder 20' White 34'	Report	Keena 10', 29'	Stadium: Tulloch Caledonian Stadium; Attendance: 1,994; Referee: Cook

3 November 2018 Championship	Inverness Caledonian Thistle	2–2	Ross County	Inverness
15:00	Oakley 19' Rooney 30'	Report	Lindsay 17' McKay (o.g.)	Stadium: Tulloch Caledonian Stadium; Attendance: 4,353; Referee: Kevin Clancy
Note: Highland derby

10 November 2018 Championship	Partick Thistle	0–1	Inverness Caledonian Thistle	Glasgow
15:00			Walsh 71'	Stadium: Firhill Stadium; Attendance: 2,509; Referee: Kirkland

17 November 2018 Championship	Queen of the South	3–3	Inverness Caledonian Thistle	Dumfries
15:00	Dykes 31', Dobbie 51', Todd 61'	Report	McCart 71', Austin 74', Welsh (penalty scored)	Stadium: Palmerston Park; Attendance: 1,233; Referee: Greg Aitken

1 December 2018 Championship	Inverness Caledonian Thistle	2–3	Falkirk	Inverness
15:00	Walsh 6', Oakley 61'	Report	Rudden 16', 36', Harrison 93'	Stadium: Tulloch Caledonian Stadium; Attendance: 2,260; Referee: Colin Steven

7 December 2018 Championship	Ayr United	P – P	Inverness Caledonian Thistle	Ayr
19:45				Stadium: Somerset Park
Note: Friday night fixture to fit BT Sport coverage. Only championship match to be shown on BT Sport all season. Game called off due to high winds.

15 December 2018 Championship	Inverness Caledonian Thistle	1–1	Dundee United	Inverness
15:00	Walsh 18'	Report	King 76'	Stadium: Tulloch Caledonian Stadium; Attendance: 2,464; Referee: Collum

22 December 2018 Championship	Greenock Morton	1–2	Inverness Caledonian Thistle	Greenock
15:00	Tiffoney 73'	Report	Walsh 17', Doran 49'	Stadium: Cappielow Park; Attendance: 1,608; Referee: Steven Reid

29 December 2018 Championship	Ross County	2–1	Inverness Caledonian Thistle	Dingwall
15:00	Mckay 16', Stewart 84'	Report	White 31'	Stadium: Victoria Park; Attendance: 6,313; Referee: Dallas

6 January 2019 Championship	Inverness Caledonian Thistle	1–2	Queen of the South	Inverness
15:00	Walsh 69'	Report	Mercer 83', Dobbie 84'	Stadium: Tulloch Caledonian Stadium; Attendance: 2,225; Referee: Cook

13 January 2019 Championship	Inverness Caledonian Thistle	1–0	Ayr United	Inverness
15:00	White 64'	Report		Stadium: Tulloch Caledonian Stadium; Attendance: 2,283; Referee: Collum

26 January 2019 Championship	Falkirk	2–2	Inverness Caledonian Thistle	Falkirk
15:00	Rudden 29', McShane 56'	Report	Rooney 12', Doran 45'	Stadium: Falkirk Stadium; Attendance: 5,823; Referee: Munro

29 January 2019 Championship	Ayr United	2–3	Inverness Caledonian Thistle	Ayr
19:45	McDaid 53', Shankland 85'	Report	Austin 9', 12', Polworth 18'	Stadium: Somerset Park; Attendance: 1,559; Referee: Walsh

2 February 2019 Championship	Inverness Caledonian Thistle	1–2	Partick Thistle	Inverness
15:00	McCauley 77'		Anderson 21', Fitzpatrick 25'	Stadium: Tulloch Caledonian Stadium; Attendance: 2,171

16 February 2019 Championship	Dunfermline	1–0	Inverness Caledonian Thistle	Dunfermline
15:00	Thomson 47'	Report		Stadium: East End Park; Attendance: 4,497; Referee: Steven Kirkland

23 February 2019 Championship	Inverness Caledonian Thistle	1–0	Greenock Morton	Inverness
15:00	Tremarco 11'	Report		Stadium: Caledonian Stadium; Attendance: 2,413; Referee: Steven Reid

26 February 2019 Championship	Dundee United	1–0	Inverness Caledonian Thistle	Dundee
	Connolly (yellow card) 32'; Pawlett (yellow card) 48' (yellow-red card) 72'; Clark 68' (pen.); Šafranko (yellow card) 82'	Report	McHattie (yellow card) 17'; Rooney (yellow card) 47'	Stadium: Tannadice Stadium; Attendance: 4,737; Referee: Barry Cook

9 March 2019 Championship	Queen of the South	0–2	Inverness Caledonian Thistle	Dumfries
	Aird (yellow card) 43'; Wilson (yellow card) 76'; Doyle (yellow card) 83'	Report	Doran 7'; McKay 20'	Stadium: Palmerston Park; Attendance: 1,066; Referee: David Munro

15 March 2019 Championship	Inverness Caledonian Thistle	P – P	Ross County	Inverness
17:05		Report		Stadium: Caledonian Stadium; Referee: Nick Walsh
Note: Friday night fixture, to be shown on BBC Scotland. Called off due to torrential rain

22 March 2018 Championship	Partick Thistle	1–2	Inverness Caledonian Thistle	Glasgow
17:05	Bannigan 68'	Report	Doran 65', Walsh 81'	Stadium: Firhill Stadium; Attendance: 2,149; Referee: John Beaton

26 March 2019 Championship	Inverness Caledonian Thistle	3–2	Alloa Athletic	Inverness
19:45	Doran 29', Welsh (penalty scored) , White 61'	Report	Trouten (penalty scored) , Flannigan 90'	Stadium: Caledonian Stadium; Attendance: 2,006; Referee: Steven Reid

30 March 2019 Championship	Inverness Caledonian Thistle	0–0	Falkirk	Inverness
15:00		Report		Stadium: Caledonian Stadium; Attendance: 2,817; Referee: Gavin Ross

2 April 2019 Championship	Inverness Caledonian Thistle	1–2	Ross County	Inverness
19:05	Tremarco 24', Trafford (yellow card) 45+1' (yellow-red card)	Report	Mullin 8', Boyle 34'	Stadium: Caledonian Stadium; Attendance: 3,795; Referee: Nick Walsh
Note: Rescheduled fixture from the 15 March

6 April 2019 Championship	Ayr United	0–1	Inverness Caledonian Thistle	Ayr
15:00		Report	McKay 66'	Stadium: Somerset Park; Attendance: 1,566; Referee: Craig Thompson

16 April 2019 Championship	Greenock Morton	2–2	Inverness Caledonian Thistle	Greenock
19:45	Lyon 27', Kiltie 42'	Report	McDonald 18', McCauley 88'	Stadium: Cappielow Park; Attendance: 1,315; Referee: David Lowe

20 April 2019 Championship	Inverness Caledonian Thistle	0–2	Dundee United	Inverness
15:00	McKay (yellow card) 90+2' (yellow-red card)	Report	Šafranko 27', McMullan 49'	Stadium: Caledonian Stadium; Attendance: 2,971

*despite losing to Dundee United, Inverness still secured play-offs, as Dunfermline failed to gain ground against Queen of the South.

27 April 2019 Championship	Alloa Athletic	1–2	Inverness Caledonian Thistle	Alloa
15:00	Trouten (penalty scored)	Report	Rooney 68', Trafford 73'	Stadium: Indodrill Stadium; Attendance: 826; Referee: Mike Roncone

4 May 2019 Championship	Inverness Caledonian Thistle	1–0	Dunfermline Athletic	Inverness
15:00	Austin 35'	Report		Stadium: Caledonian Stadium; Attendance: 2,828; Referee: Graham Beaton

=== Premiership play-offs ===
7 May 2019 Premiership play-off Quarter-final 1st Leg	Ayr United	1–3	Inverness Caledonian Thistle	Ayr
19:45	Rose 65'	Report	Trafford 33', White 51', 76' (penalty)	Stadium: Somerset Park; Attendance: 2,171; Referee: Alan Muir

11 May 2019 Premiership play-off Quarter-final 2nd Leg	Inverness Caledonian Thistle	1–1 (4–2 agg.)	Ayr United	Inverness
15:00	Donaldson 79'	Report	McCowan 19'	Stadium: Caledonian Stadium; Attendance: 2,323; Referee: Steven McLean
Note: Inverness progressed to the semi-finals after winning 4–2 on aggregate

14 May 2019 Premiership play-off Semi-final 1st Leg	Inverness Caledonian Thistle	0–1	Dundee United	Inverness
19:45	Polworth (red card) 48'	Report	McMullan 78'	Stadium: Caledonian Stadium; Attendance: 2,604; Referee: Nick Walsh

19 May 2019 Premiership play-off Semi-final 2nd Leg	Dundee United	3 – 0 (4–0 agg.)	Inverness Caledonian Thistle	Dundee
19:45	Clark 45+1', Sow 54', Safranko 80'	Report		Stadium: Tannadice; Attendance: 8,540; Referee: Kevin Clancy
Note: Dundee United progressed to the finals after winning 4–0 on aggregate

=== Scottish Cup ===
Inverness played their Scottish Cup match on Sunday, 25 November 2018, as they are drawn into the 3rd round of the tournament against Edinburgh City.

25 November 2018 Third round	Edinburgh City	1–1	Inverness Caledonian Thistle	Edinburgh
15:00	Henderson 86'	Report	Rooney 39'	Stadium: Ainslie Park; Attendance: 867; Referee: David Munro
Note: Rescheduled due to Edinburgh having an Irn Bru Cup fixture the day before, which has been moved to December

4 December 2018 Third round Replay	Inverness Caledonian Thistle	6–1	Edinburgh City	Inverness
19:45	Walsh 5', 53', White 15', 60', 61' Doran 90+1'	Report	Henderson 7'	Stadium: Caledonian Stadium; Attendance: 672; Referee: David Munro

19 January 2019 Fourth round	Inverness Caledonian Thistle	4–0	East Kilbride	Inverness
15:00	White 6', Doran 21', Polworth 26', Reid 71' (o.g.)	Report		Stadium: Caledonian Stadium; Attendance: 1,196

11 February 2019 Fifth round	Ross County	2–2	Inverness Caledonian Thistle	Dingwall
19:15	Stewart 55', Mullin 90+1'	Report	Doran 15', McKay 65'	Stadium: Victoria Park; Attendance: 2,862; Referee: John Beaton

19 February 2019 Fifth round Replay	Inverness Caledonian Thistle	2–2 (a.e.t.) (5–4 p)	Ross County	Inverness
19:15	White 56', 81'	Report	Stewart 22', Gardyne 67'	Stadium: Tulloch Caledonian Stadium; Attendance: 3,608
	Penalties
	White (penalty scored) , Donaldson (penalty scored) , Welsh (penalty scored) , Polworth (penalty scored) , Austin (penalty scored) ,		(penalty scored) Gardyne, (penalty scored) Fraser, (penalty missed) McManus, (penalty scored) Graham, (penalty scored) Draper,

3 March 2019 Quarter-finals	Dundee United	1–2	Inverness Caledonian Thistle	Dundee
15:30	Clark 68' (pen)	Report	Chalmers 19', Doran 90+2'	Stadium: Tannadice; Attendance: 7,274; Referee: Steven McLean

13 April 2019 Scottish Cup Semi-final	Heart of Midlothian	3–0	Inverness Caledonian Thistle	Hampden Park
12:15	Ikpeazu 49'; Souttar 66'; Clare 74' (Penalty)	BBC Report		Attendance: 21,011; Referee: Robertson

=== League Cup ===
Inverness were drawn into Group C of the 2018–19 Scottish League Cup on 25 May 2018, along with Heart of Midlothian, Raith Rovers, Cowdenbeath, and Cove Rangers, the first match will be played on 14 July. However, Inverness failed to make the best runners up, losing out on goal difference to Partick Thistle.

14 July 2018 League Cup Group C	Inverness Caledonian Thistle	2–0	Cove Rangers	Inverness
15:00	Austin 30', 41'			Stadium: Caledonian Stadium; Attendance: 932

17 July 2018 League Cup Group C	Cowdenbeath	2–5	Inverness Caledonian Thistle	Cowdenbeath
19:45	Sheerin 24', 81'	Report	Walsh 34', 41' Doran 45', 80' Oakley 73'	Stadium: Central Park; Attendance: 374

24 July 2018 League Cup Group C	Inverness Caledonian Thistle	2–1	Raith Rovers	Inverness
19:45	Austin 49' MacKay 88'	Report	Gillespie 62'	Stadium: Caledonian Stadium; Attendance: 1,295

29 July 2018 League Cup Group C	Heart of Midlothian	5–0	Inverness Caledonian Thistle	Edinburgh
15:00	Ikpeazu 29', 33' Garuccio 32' Naismith 64', 81'	Report		Stadium: Tynecastle Park; Attendance: 10,030

=== Irn Bru Challenge Cup ===
Inverness were the defending champions going into this cup, with the first game being played on 14 August 2018, however were knocked out in their first game by Dunfermline.

14 August 2018 Challenge Cup First round	Inverness Caledonian Thistle	1–2	Dunfermline Athletic	Inverness
19:45	White 61'		Higginbotham (penalty scored) Smith 87'	Stadium: Caledonian Stadium; Attendance: 1,046

=== North of Scotland Cup ===
In this competition, Inverness will use a mixed team of mainly U19s and some first team/reserve players to give a fair chance to the significantly smaller teams they come up against.

31 July 2018 North of Scotland Cup	Fort William	0–16	Inverness Caledonian Thistle	Fort William
20:00				Stadium: Claggan Park

22 August 2018 Quarter-finals	Lossiemouth	0–6	Inverness Caledonian Thistle	Lossiemouth
20:00				Stadium: Grant Park

11 September 2018 Semi-finals	Inverness Caledonian Thistle	4–0	Forres Mechanics	Inverness
20:00				Stadium: Caledonian Stadium; Referee: Billy Baxter

7 October 2018 Final	Inverness Caledonian Thistle	2–3	Ross County	Inverness
15:00				Stadium: Grant Street Park

== Team statistics ==
=== League table ===
Pos	Team	Pld	W	D	L	GF	GA	GD	Pts	Promotion, qualification or relegation
1	Ross County (C, P)	36	21	8	7	63	34	+29	71	Promotion to the Premiership
2	Dundee United	36	19	8	9	49	40	+9	65	Qualification for the Premiership play-off semi-final
3	Inverness Caledonian Thistle	36	14	14	8	48	40	+8	56	Qualification for the Premiership play-off quarter-final
4	Ayr United	36	15	9	12	50	38	+12	54	Qualification for the Premiership play-off quarter-final
5	Greenock Morton	36	11	13	12	36	45	−9	46	

Source: SPFL
Rules for classification: 1) Points; 2) Goal difference; 3) Goals scored; 4) Points in head-to-head matches; 5) Goal difference in hth matches; 6). Goals scored in hth matches; 7). Play-off (only for deciding promotion, play-off participation and relegation).
(C) Champions; (P) Promoted

=== Management Statistics ===
Correct as of 17 Aug 2018
Name	From	To	P	W	D	L	Win%
John Robertson	15 July 2017	Present	7	4	1	2	57.14

== First team player statistics ==
=== League Goalscorers ===
Rank	Player	Goals	Latest Goal
1st	(Scotland) Jordan White	7	vs. Alloa Athletic, 26 Mar 2019
2nd	(Scotland) Tom Walsh	6	vs. Partick Thistle, 22 Mar 2019
3rd	(Republic of Ireland) Aaron Doran	5	vs. Alloa Athletic, 26 Mar 2019
=	(Scotland) Shaun Rooney	5	vs. Alloa Athletic, 27 Apr 2019
5th	(Scotland) Sean Welsh	4	vs. Alloa Athletic, 26 Mar 2019
=	(England) George Oakley	4	vs. Falkirk, 1 Dec 2018
=	(Scotland) Nathan Austin	4	vs. Dunfermline Athletic, 4 May 2019
8th	(Scotland) Brad McKay	3	vs. Ayr United, 6 Apr 2019
9th	(Scotland) Liam Polworth	2	vs. Ayr United, 29 Jan 2019
=	(England) Carl Tremarco	2	vs. Ross County, 2 Apr 2019
=	(Northern Ireland) Darren McCauley	2	vs. Greenock Morton, 16 Apr 2019
12th	(Canada) Charlie Trafford	1	vs. Alloa Athletic, 27 Apr 2019
=	(Scotland) Jamie McCart	1	vs. Queen of the South, 17 Nov 2018
=	(England) Riccardo Calder	1	vs. Dunfermline Athletic, 30 Oct 2018
=	(Scotland) Anthony McDonald	1	vs. Greenock Morton, 16 Apr 2019
Total Goals Scored =		48 Goals	

=== Overall Goalscorers ===
Rank	Player	Goals
1st	(Scotland) Jordan White	16
2nd	(Republic of Ireland) Aaron Doran	11
3rd	(Scotland) Tom Walsh	10
4th	(Scotland) Nathan Austin	7
5th	(Scotland) Shaun Rooney	6
6th	(England) George Oakley	5
7th	(Scotland) Sean Welsh	4
8th	(Scotland) Liam Polworth	3
=	(Scotland) Brad McKay	3
10th	(Scotland) Joe Chalmers	2
=	(England) Carl Tremarco	2
=	(Northern Ireland) Darren McCauley	2
=	(Canada) Charlie Trafford	2
14th	(Scotland) Daniel MacKay	1
=	(England) Riccardo Calder	1
=	(Scotland) Jamie McCart	1
=	(Scotland) Anthony McDonald	1
=	(Scotland) Coll Donaldson	1
Total Goals Scored =		78

*as of match played 11 May 2019

**players in Italics left the club during the season, so cannot move up the table

=== Hat-tricks ===
Player	Competition	Score	Opponent	Date
(Scotland) Daniel MacKay	Friendly	0–5	Strathspey Thistle	30 June 2018
(Scotland) Jordan White	Friendly	2–4	Forres Mechanics	3 July 2018
(Scotland) Tom Walsh	Friendly	0–8	Buckie Thistle	10 July 2018
(Scotland) Jordan White	Scottish Cup	6–1	Edinburgh City	4 December 2018

=== Transfers ===
Transfers In
Player	Age*	Pos	From	Fee	Date	Notes/Additional Info
(Scotland) Shaun Rooney	21	DF	(Scotland) Queen of the South	Pre-contract agreement	25 April 2018	
10 U18 Players	16/17/18	All	Academy		14 May 2018	First mass call up of youth squad
(Scotland) Tom Walsh	21	MF	(Scotland) Dumbarton	Free	15 May 2018	
(Scotland) Angus Beith	22	MF	(Scotland) Heart of Midlothian	Swap	15 May 2018	Swap deal for Jake Mulraney
(Scotland) Jordan White	26	FW	(England) Barrow	Free	6 June 2018	
(Scotland) Jamie McCart	21	DF	(Scotland) Celtic	Free	14 June 2018	
(Scotland) Sean Welsh	28	MF	(Scotland) Falkirk	Free	16 July 2018	
(Brazil) Matheus Machado	17	MF	(Brazil) Red Bull Brasil	Free	21 August 2018	Placed in U18 Squad for time being, put on bench in March 2019
(Scotland) Kevin McHattie	25	DF	(Republic of Ireland) Derry City	Free	3 January 2019	
(Northern Ireland) Darren McCauley	27	MF	(Northern Ireland) Coleraine	Free	24 January 2019	

Transfers Out
Player	Age*	Pos	To	Fee	Date	Notes/Additional Info
(Scotland) John Baird	33	FW	(Scotland) Forfar Athletic	Free	3 May 2018	Accepted player/assistant manager role.
(Scotland) Iain Vigurs	30	MF	(Scotland) Ross County	Free	15 May 2018	
(Republic of Ireland) Jake Mulraney	22	MF	(Scotland) Heart of Midlothian	Swap	15 May 2018	Swap deal for Angus Beith.
(England) Connor Bell	21	FW	(Scotland) Greenock Morton	Free	6 June 2018	
(England) Gary Warren	33	DF	(England) Yeovil Town	Free	27 June 2018	
(Scotland) Ryan Esson	38	GK	Retired (unofficially)	N/A	2 July 2018	Became goalkeeping/U18 coach.
(Netherlands) Collin Seedorf	23	DF	(Netherlands) FC Eindhoven	Free	7 July 2018	Initially was listed to leave the club in May.
(Republic of Ireland) Zack Elbouzedi	20	MF	Terminated Contract	N/A	31 August 2018	Left by mutual consent.
(England) Riccardo Calder	22	MF	Contract terminated	N/A	8 November 2018	Kicked out after found guilty of assault.
(England) George Oakley	23	FW	(Scotland) Hamilton Academical	Undisclosed	31 January 2019	
(Scotland) Angus Beith	23	MF	Retired	N/A	5 April 2019	Retired due to serious hip injury, didn't make any appearances.

Loans In
Player	Age*	Pos	From	Duration	Date in	Date out	Notes/Additional Info
(Wales) Owain Fôn Williams	31	GK	(United States) Indy Eleven	Loan Return	30 November 2018	N/A	Left on loan the previous season.
(Scotland) Cammy Mackay	22	GK	(Scotland) Rothes	Loan Return	1 January 2019	N/A	
(Scotland) Anthony McDonald	17	MF	(Scotland) Heart of Midlothian	Rest of season	25 January 2019	End of season	Only player to be loaned in during the entire season.

Loans Out
Player	Age*	Pos	To	Duration	Date out	Date in	Notes/Additional Info
(Scotland) Daniel Hoban	20	GK	(Scotland) Forfar Athletic	Rest of season	10 January 2019	End of season	

*At time of transfer/loan

== See also ==
- List of Inverness Caledonian Thistle F.C. seasons
