= Austin Samuels =

English footballer

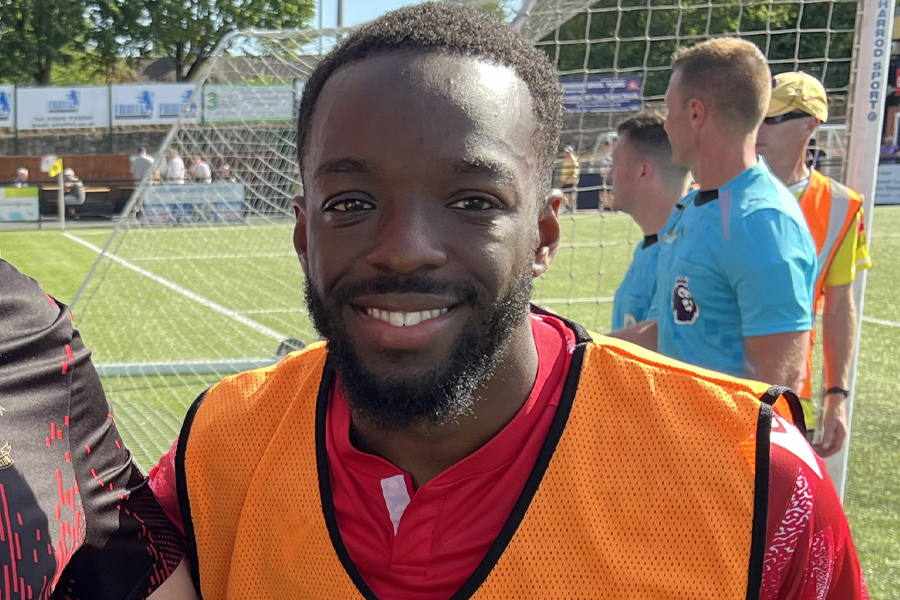
- Samuels in July 2025

Personal information
- Full name: Austin Samuels
- Date of birth: 20 November 2000 (age 25)
- Place of birth: Wolverhampton, England
- Height: 1.78 m (5 ft 10 in)
- Position: Forward

Team information
- Current team: Shifnal Town

Youth career
- 2009–2019: Wolverhampton Wanderers

Senior career*
Years	Team	Apps	(Gls)
2019–2022	Wolverhampton Wanderers	0	(0)
2020	→ Kidderminster Harriers (loan)	6	(0)
2020–2021	→ Bradford City (loan)	12	(0)
2021–2022	→ Aberdeen (loan)	7	(0)
2022–2024	Inverness Caledonian Thistle	37	(4)
2024–2025	Greenock Morton	5	(0)
2025	Rushall Olympic	9	(3)
2025	Spennymoor Town	3	(0)
2025	Alfreton Town	3	(1)
2025–	Shifnal Town	1	(0)

International career
- England youth
- * Club domestic league appearances and goals as of 18:56, 19 November 2025 (UTC)

Austin Samuels (born 20 November 2000) is an English professional footballer who plays as a forward for Northern Premier League Division One West club Shifnal Town.

Samuels began his career with Wolverhampton Wanderers, spending time on loan at Kidderminster Harriers, Bradford City and Aberdeen. After leaving Wolves, he played for Inverness Caledonian Thistle and Greenock Morton.

== Club career ==
Born in Wolverhampton, Samuels began his career with Wolverhampton Wanderers, joining them at the age of 8. He made his first-team debut at the age of 16 in July 2017 in a friendly match against Peterborough United, scoring the only goal of the game.

He moved on loan to Kidderminster Harriers in January 2020, and on loan to Bradford City in October 2020. In November 2020 he was one of a number of young Bradford City players playing in the first team who were praised by manager Stuart McCall. He scored his first goal for the club, and his first professional goal, when he scored in a 7–0 FA Cup win over Tonbridge Angels on 7 November 2020. Later that month Samuels said that he was growing in confidence as he played more first-team matches. His loan ended early on 13 January 2021.

In August 2021 he moved on loan to Scottish club Aberdeen for the season. The loan ended early, in January 2022.

He signed for Inverness Caledonian Thistle in January 2022, later suffering an injury which saw him out-of-action for over 5 months, returning in February 2023. He signed a new contract in June 2023. At the start of the 2023–24 season, he said the club needed to maintain form in order to be promoted. He left the club following the conclusion of the 2023–24 season.

In October 2024, he signed a short-term contract with Greenock Morton. After making his debut for the club in a 1–0 win over Hamilton Academical in the SPFL Trust Trophy, Samuels said he was emotional to return to playing football. He departed the club upon the expiry of his short-term contract in January 2025.

On 20 February 2025, Samuels joined National League North club Rushall Olympic.

In August 2025, he joined National League North club Spennymoor Town on a short-term contract until the end of December 2025. On 17 September, he departed the club by mutual consent having made three substitute appearances. Shortly after, he joined fellow National League North side Alfreton Town, before departing a month later. In November 2025, he joined Northern Premier League Division One West club Shifnal Town.

== International career ==
Samuels was an England youth international.

== Playing style ==
Samuels is known for his pace. When he joined Inverness he was utilised more as a winger than a centre forward.

== Career statistics ==
As of 5 May 2025

Appearances and goals by club, season and competition
Club	Season	League			FA Cup		League Cup		Other		Total	
Club	Season	Division	Apps	Goals	Apps	Goals	Apps	Goals	Apps	Goals	Apps	Goals
Wolverhampton Wanderers U21s	2018–19 EFL Trophy		—		—		—		1 (Note: Appearance(s) in the EFL Trophy.)	0	1	0
Wolverhampton Wanderers U21s	2019–20 EFL Trophy		—		—		—		3	0	3	1
Wolverhampton Wanderers U21s	2020–21 EFL Trophy		—		—		—		2	1	2	1
Wolverhampton Wanderers U21s	Total		—		—		—		6	2	6	2
Wolverhampton Wanderers	2019–20	Premier League	0	0	0	0	0	0	0	0	0	0
Wolverhampton Wanderers	2020–21	Premier League	0	0	0	0	0	0	0	0	0	0
Wolverhampton Wanderers	2021–22	Premier League	0	0	0	0	0	0	0	0	0	0
Wolverhampton Wanderers	Total		0	0	0	0	0	0	0	0	0	0
Kidderminster Harriers (loan)	2019–20	National League North	6	0	0	0	0	0	0	0	6	0
Bradford City (loan)	2020–21	League Two	12	0	2	1	0	0	0	0	14	1
Aberdeen (loan)	2021–22	Scottish Premiership	7	0	0	0	0	0	0	0	7	0
Inverness Caledonian Thistle	2021–22	Scottish Championship	13	1	0	0	0	0	6 (Note: Appearances in the play-offs.)	2	19	3
Inverness Caledonian Thistle	2022–23	Scottish Championship	17	3	3	0	4	1	0	0	24	4
Inverness Caledonian Thistle	2023–24	Scottish Championship	7	0	0	0	5	0	1	0	13	0
Inverness Caledonian Thistle	Total		37	4	3	0	9	1	7	2	56	7
Greenock Morton	2024–25	Scottish Championship	5	0	1	0	0	0	2 (Note: Appearances in the Scottish League Challenge Cup) (Note: The game on 11 October 2024 does not appear on Soccerbase, but Samuels did play.)	1	8	1
Rushall Olympic	2024–25	National League North	9	3	0	0	0	0	0	0	9	3
Career total			76	7	6	1	9	1	15	5	106	14
