= Murder of Ailish Walsh =

Murder of an Irish woman in 2022

- A selfie of Walsh taken in 2022

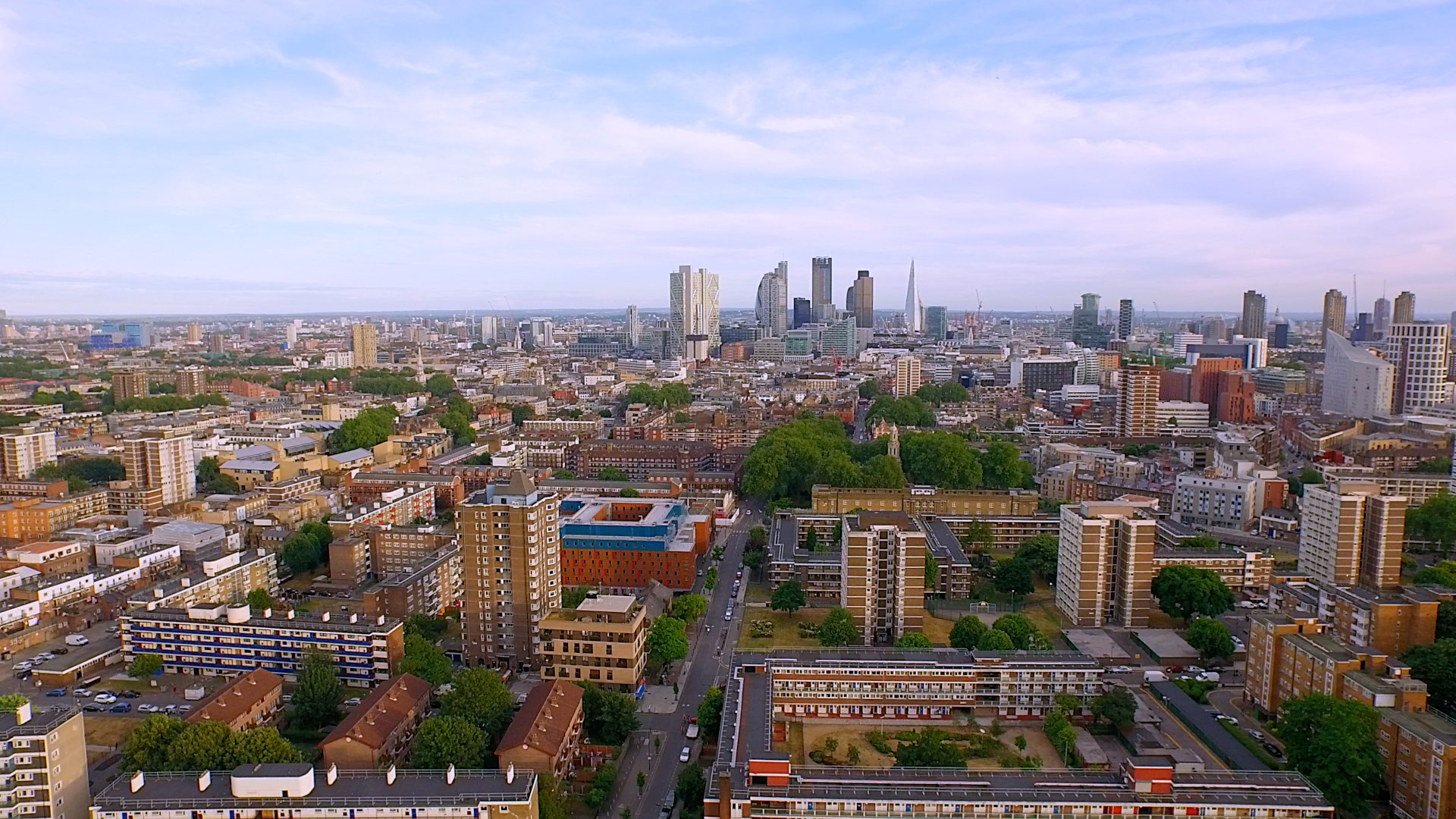
- Rectory Road's coordinates
- Location: 51.559°N 0.068°W; Hackney, London
- Date: 15 December 2022; 3 years ago (UTC+0)
- Attack type: Stabbing
- Weapons: Scissors, dumbbell
- Deaths: 1 (Ailish Walsh)
- Victim: Ailish Walsh
- Motive: Anger, frustration
- Verdict: Guilty
- Convictions: Murder
- Convicted: Liam Taylor
- Judge: Nigel Lickley

On the evening of 15 December 2022, 28-year-old Irish woman Ailish Walsh was found dead in her flat in Hackney, London, with multiple stab wounds inflicted with a pair of scissors; she was 22 weeks pregnant and lived with her partner, Liam Taylor. Taylor was found guilty of the murder and sentenced to life in prison with a minimum term of 27 years. His minimum term was reduced to 25 years on appeal.

== Murder ==
=== Discovery and investigation ===
On the evening of 15 December 2022, emergency services were called to a flat on Rectory Road in Hackney, East London, after concerns were raised about the welfare of a woman inside the property. When police arrived, they found Ailish Walsh unresponsive in a bedroom. She was pronounced dead at the scene.

A post-mortem examination later concluded that Walsh had sustained multiple stab wounds. In court proceedings, it was stated that she had suffered more than 40 injuries inflicted with a pair of scissors and a dumbbell, possibly two dumbbells, according to reports. The attack was described by prosecutors as sustained and violent, with particular emphasis on the number and severity of the wounds.

=== Arrest and aftermath ===
CCTV footage found during the investigation showed that Liam Taylor, Walsh's partner, was seen leaving the flat shortly after her murder; police went to Taylor's address and arrested him a day after the incident. It was also reported by the BBC that Taylor had cocaine, cannabis, and alcohol in his system. According to news sources, Walsh was left isolated from family and friends for weeks before her death.

Walsh's father later went to the crime scene after being informed of concerns for her safety. He gained entry to the property and found her body in her bedroom before emergency services completed their assessment. At the time of her death, Walsh was 22 weeks pregnant; this detail was highlighted during later court proceedings as part of the prosecution’s case.

== Legal proceedings ==
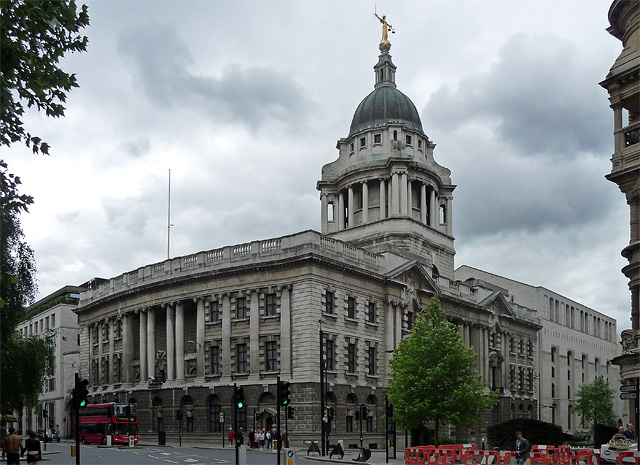
The Old Bailey building in 2011

In April 2023, Taylor refused to go to court due to stress. He later pleaded guilty to the murder at the Old Bailey. In August 2023, he was sentenced to life imprisonment with a minimum term of 27 years. In 2024, this minimum term was reduced to 25 years following an appeal, though the life sentence remained in place. Taylor had previously been jailed for 12 months for attacking his mother with a metal pole and also assaulting his sister.

The case received significant media attention in both the United Kingdom and Ireland, particularly due to the circumstances of the killing and Walsh's pregnancy. A public fundraiser was also established to assist with funeral arrangements and the repatriation of her remains to Ireland.

== See also ==
- Crime in London, Statistics on crime rates in London
- Domestic violence in the United Kingdom, Crimes related to domestic violence
- Metropolitan Police Service, Territorial police force of Greater London
