= Darren McCauley =

Irish footballer (born 1991)

Personal information
- Date of birth: 29 November 1991 (age 34)
- Place of birth: Derry, Northern Ireland
- Positions: Striker; winger

Youth career
- 2003–2007: Top of the Hill Celtic

Senior career*
Years	Team	Apps	(Gls)
2008–2010	Derry City	12	(2)
2010	→ Celtic (loan)	0	(0)
2011–2012	Coleraine	17	(0)
2012	→ Institute (loan)	11	(1)
2012–2014	Institute	55	(21)
2014–2018	Coleraine	146	(41)
2019	Inverness Caledonian Thistle	13	(2)
2019–2020	Derry City	13	(1)
2020–2021	Essendon Royals		
2021	St Albans Saints	6	(1)

International career
2009	Republic of Ireland U19	1	(0)
- * Club domestic league appearances and goals

Darren McCauley (born 29 November 1991) is an Irish footballer who plays as a striker.

== Club career ==
McCauley spent his youth career with local club Top of the Hill Celtic before joining the Derry City academy. He made his Derry City debut in 2009 aged 17. After numerous trials with cross channel clubs, Motherwell FC and Blackburn Rovers FC offered professional contracts but could not come to a compensation deal with Derry City who were going into financial liquidation at the time. He then joined Celtic FC in a loan deal. Upon his return from Celtic he signed back with Derry City and would go on to win the First Division. He then had spells with Irish League clubs Coleraine FC and Institute FC. At Coleraine he won the 2018 Irish Cup and scored the first European goal in 20 years against Spartak Subotica in the Europa League. In 2018 McCauley embraced teetotalism and experienced an improvement in his football career. He signed for Scottish Championship club Inverness Caledonian Thistle in January 2019. He scored on his 3rd appearance for Inverness, in a 2–1 loss to Partick Thistle. He signed again for Derry City before joining Australian side Essendon Royals in 2020.

== International career ==
He was previously a member of the Northern Ireland Under-18 Schools' team that won the tri-nation Schools' tournament in Jersey in February 2009.

He also captained the under 18 schoolboys to victory in the Carnegie Centenary Shield match against England in March 2009.

McCauley was also a member of the Republic of Ireland Under 19 squad.

== Career statistics ==
As of Match Played 24 February 2019

Appearances and Goals by Club, Season, League and Cup
Club	Season	League			National Cup		League Cup		Other		Total	
Club	Season	Division	Apps	Goals	Apps	Goals	Apps	Goals	Apps	Goals	Apps	Goals
Derry City	2008–09	Premier Division	3	0							3	0
Derry City	2009–10	Premier Division	9	2	0	0	0	0	0	0	2	0
Celtic (Loan)	2010–11	Scottish Premier League	0	0							0	0
Coleraine	2011–12	IFA Premiership	14	0							17	0
Institute (Loan)	2011–12	IFA Championship 1	11	1							11	1
Institute	2012–13	IFA Championship 1										
Institute	2013–14	NIFL Championship 1										
Institute	2014–15	NIFL Premiership	5	1							5	1
Institute	Institute Total		16+	2+							16+	2+
Coleraine	2014–15	NIFL Premiership	15	1					0	0	15	1
Coleraine	2015–16	NIFL Premiership	30	7					1	0	31	7
Coleraine	2016–17	NIFL Premiership	36	8					0	0	36	8
Coleraine	2017–18	NIFL Premiership	36	17					2	0	38	17
Coleraine	2018–19	NIFL Premiership	23	7			2	0	4	1	28	8
Coleraine	Coleraine Total		140	40			2+	0+	7	1	148+	41+
Inverness Caledonian Thistle	2018–19	Scottish Championship	7	1	2	0	0	0	0	0	9	1
Career Total			190+	45+	2+	0+	2+	0+	7+	1+	200+	46+
