= Anthony McDonald (Scottish footballer) =

Scottish footballer (born 2001)

Personal information
- Date of birth: 17 March 2001 (age 25)
- Place of birth: Limassol, Cyprus
- Positions: Midfielder; winger

Team information
- Current team: Brechin City

Youth career
- 2009–2011: Real Fife
- 2011–2012: Livingston
- 2012–2017: Heart of Midlothian

Senior career*
Years	Team	Apps	(Gls)
2017–2020	Heart of Midlothian	17	(0)
2019	→ Inverness Caledonian Thistle (loan)	8	(1)
2019–2020	→ Dunfermline Athletic (loan)	2	(0)
2020–2021	Córdoba CF	0	(0)
2021–2022	Inverness Caledonian Thistle	2	(0)
2022	Edinburgh City	1	(0)
2022–2025	Brechin City	36	(11)

International career
2016–2018	Scotland U16	7	(0)
2018	Scotland U17	1	(0)
- * Club domestic league appearances and goals

Anthony McDonald (born 17 March 2001) is a Cypriot born Scottish footballer who plays for Lowland League East club Brechin City. He has previously played for Heart of Midlothian, Inverness Caledonian Thistle, Dunfermline Athletic, Córdoba CF and Edinburgh City.

== Early life ==
McDonald was born in Limassol and raised in Kirkcaldy.

== Career ==
=== Heart of Midlothian ===
He made his first team debut for Hearts, aged 16, on 12 December 2017, playing from the start in a 2–0 win against Dundee at Tynecastle Park. McDonald provided the assist for the opening goal.

He joined Hearts at under-14 level from Livingston. He was a member of the Scotland under-16 Victory Shield squad.

=== Inverness Caledonian Thistle (Loan) ===
McDonald moved on loan to Inverness Caledonian Thistle in January 2019. While with Inverness he scored his first ever professional goal, in a 2–2 draw against Greenock Morton.

=== Dunfermline Athletic (Loan) ===
McDonald moved on loan to Dunfermline Athletic with fellow Hearts youngster, Harry Cochrane, on 30 August 2019. Following a lengthy time out with injuries, McDonald made his Dunfermline debut from the bench on 21 December 2019 in a 2–0 loss to his former club, Inverness Caledonian Thistle.

=== Córdoba ===
On 5 October 2020, McDonald signed for Spanish club Córdoba CF, on a two-year deal.

=== Inverness Caledonian Thistle ===
McDonald returned to Scotland in February 2021 to sign with Inverness Caledonian Thistle on a deal until the end of the season.

On 5 May 2021, McDonald signed a new deal with Inverness CT. He left the club upon expiry of his contract on 7 January 2022.

=== Edinburgh City ===
On 7 January 2022, upon the expiration of his contract at Inverness CT, McDonald immediately joined Scottish League Two side Edinburgh City.

=== Brechin City ===
In August 2022, McDonald moved from Edinburgh City (at the time renamed to F.C. Edinburgh) to Highland League side Brechin City.

== Career statistics ==
As of 7 January 2022

Appearances and goals by club, season and competition
Club	Season	League			Scottish Cup		League Cup		Other		Total	
Club	Season	Division	Apps	Goals	Apps	Goals	Apps	Goals	Apps	Goals	Apps	Goals
Heart of Midlothian	2017–18	Scottish Premiership	13	0	1	0	0	0	—		14	0
Heart of Midlothian	2018–19	Scottish Premiership	3	0	0	0	3	0	—		6	0
Heart of Midlothian	2019–20	Scottish Premiership	1	0	1	0	3	1	—		5	1
Heart of Midlothian	Total		17	0	2	0	6	1	0	0	25	1
Heart of Midlothian U21 (Note: Matches in the Scottish Challenge Cup, in which age-restricted teams from the SPFL Premiership clubs compete against senior clubs.)	2018–19		—						1	0	1	0
Inverness Caledonian Thistle (loan)	2018–19	Scottish Championship	8	1	1	0	0	0	—		9	1
Dunfermline Athletic (loan)	2019–20	Scottish Championship	2	0	0	0	0	0	—		2	0
Córdoba CF	2020–21	Segunda Division B	0	0	0	0	—		—		0	0
Inverness Caledonian Thistle	2020–21	Scottish Championship	0	0	0	0	0	0	0	0	0	0
Inverness Caledonian Thistle	2021–22	Scottish Championship	2	0	0	0	1	0	2	0	5	0
Inverness Caledonian Thistle	Total		2	0	0	0	1	0	2	0	5	0
Edinburgh City	2021–22	Scottish League Two	12	2	1	0	0	0	0	0	13	2
Brechin City	2022–23	Highland League	0	0	0	0	0	0	0	0	0	0
Career total			41	3	4	0	6	1	2	0	53	4
