= Matheus Machado =

Brazilian footballer

Personal information
- Full name: Matheus Pires Machado
- Date of birth: 9 July 2001 (age 25)
- Place of birth: São Paulo, Brazil
- Height: 1.72 m (5 ft 8 in)
- Position: Midfielder

Team information
- Current team: Strathspey Thistle (on loan from Elgin City)

Youth career
- 2017 –2018: Palmeiras
- 2018: Red Bull Brasil
- 2018–2019: Inverness Caledonian Thistle

Senior career*
Years	Team	Apps	(Gls)
2019–2020	Inverness Caledonian Thistle	1	(0)
2020–2021	Rio Ave B	2	(0)
2021–2022	Elgin City	18	(0)
2022–2023	Rothes	16	(5)
2023–2026	Montrose	78	(2)
2026–	Elgin City	14	(1)
2026–	→ Strathspey Thistle (loan)	1	(0)
- * Club domestic league appearances and goals as of 13:37, 18 October 2026 (UTC)

Matheus Pires Machado (born 9 July 2001) is a Brazilian footballer who plays as a midfielder for Highland League club, Strathspey Thistle, on loan from League Two side, Elgin City.

== Career ==
Machado began his career with Red Bull Brasil, before signing for Scottish club Inverness Caledonian Thistle in August 2018. He was included in a first-team squad for the first time in March 2019, and made his debut in the 2019–20 season, coming on late in a 3-1 loss to Partick Thistle.

He was released by the club in June 2020 when his contract expired. He subsequently joined Portugal's Primera Liga side, Rio Ave on 1 July 2020.

Machado returned to Scottish football in August 2021, signing for Elgin City. He made his debut for Elgin in a 2–0 away loss to Edinburgh City after being substituted on in the final 20 minutes.

On 9 August 2022, Machado left Elgin and joined Highland Football League side Rothes.

On 31 January 2023, Machado was signed by League One side, Montrose.

On 31 January 2026, Machado returned to Elgin City on a two-and-a-half year deal. On 14 October 2026, Machado joined Highland League side, Strathspey Thistle.

== Career statistics ==
=== Club ===
As of match played 30 July 2022

Club	Season	League			National Cup		League Cup		Other		Total	
Club	Season	Division	Apps	Goals	Apps	Goals	Apps	Goals	Apps	Goals	Apps	Goals
Inverness Caledonian Thistle	2018–19	Scottish Championship	0	0	0	0	0	0	0	0	0	0
Inverness Caledonian Thistle	2019–20	Scottish Championship	1	0	0	0	0	0	2 (Note: All appearances in Scottish Challenge Cup)	1	3	1
Rio Ave B	2020–21	Campeonato de Portugal	2	0	0	0	0	0	0	0	2	0
Elgin City	2021–22	Scottish League Two	17	0	1	0	2	0	1	0	21	0
Rothes	2022–23	Highland League										
Montrose	2022–23	Scottish League One	0	0	0	0	0	0	0	0	0	0
Career total			20	0	1	0	2	0	3	1	26	1
