= Jack Brown (footballer, born 2001) =

Scottish footballer

Personal information
- Date of birth: 27 July 2001 (age 25)
- Place of birth: Inverness, Scotland
- Position: Midfielder

Team information
- Current team: Formartine United (on loan from Peterhead)

Youth career
- Inverness Caledonian Thistle

Senior career*
Years	Team	Apps	(Gls)
2017–2020	Inverness Caledonian Thistle	1	(0)
2019–2020	→ Fort William (loan)	21	(4)
2020	→ Rothes (loan)	4	(0)
2020	→ Fort William (loan)		
2020–2022	Rothes		
2022–	Peterhead	138	(12)
2026–	→ Formartine United (loan)	0	(0)
- * Club domestic league appearances and goals as of 18 October 2026

Jack Brown (born 27 July 2001) is a Scottish professional footballer who plays as a midfielder for Formartine United, on loan from Scottish League One club Peterhead.

== Career ==
Brown began his career with Inverness Caledonian Thistle, and was one of 10 youth players to turn professional with the club in May 2018. He made his senior debut on 27 January 2018, in a 3–1 league defeat away at Falkirk.

In July 2019, he was one of nine Inverness players loaned to Fort William in the Highland Football League.

After the club was furloughed in 2020 due to COVID-19, Brown was one of many youth players released after it was decided that it was financially unwise for the club to have wage bills for players not getting any game time. Following this he was signed on by Rothes in the Highland League, leaving Inverness with only one appearance to his name.

In January 2022, it was announced that Brown had been signed to Peterhead.

On 6 July 2026, Brown joined Highland Football League side Formartine United on loan until January 2027.
