= Joe Hardy (footballer) =

English footballer (born 1998)

Personal information
- Full name: Joseph Keith Hardy
- Date of birth: 26 September 1998 (age 28)
- Place of birth: Wirral, England
- Height: 1.70 m (5 ft 7 in)
- Positions: Forward; right winger

Youth career
- –2012: Tranmere Rovers
- 2012–2017: Manchester City
- 2016: → Stoke City (loan)
- 2017–2020: Brentford

Senior career*
Years	Team	Apps	(Gls)
2020–2021	Liverpool	0	(0)
2021–2023	Accrington Stanley	0	(0)
2022	→ Inverness Caledonian Thistle (loan)	12	(1)
2023	→ Marine (loan)	8	(4)
2023	Bootle	5	(0)
- * Club domestic league appearances and goals

Joseph Keith Hardy (born 26 September 1998) is an English former professional footballer who played as a forward.

Hardy is a graduate of the Manchester City academy and began his professional career with the U23 teams at Brentford and Liverpool. He transferred to Accrington Stanley in 2021, but failed to make an appearance for the club. Following his release in 2023, Hardy briefly played in non-League football, before turning to youth coaching.

== Playing career ==
=== Manchester City ===
A forward or right winger, Hardy began his career with Tranmere Rovers at age eight and moved to the academy at Premier League club Manchester City at the age of 13. He progressed through the ranks and made his U18 team debut while still an U16 and signed a two-year scholarship deal at the end of the 2014–15 season. Hardy scored 11 goals in 20 U18 appearances during the 2015–16 season and had a spell on loan at the Stoke City academy. He showed prolific form during the 2016–17 season, scoring 12 goals in 11 starts, before departing the Etihad Campus in March 2017.

=== Brentford ===
On 14 March 2017, Hardy joined the B team at Championship club Brentford on a three-year contract. Over the course of the following 2 1/2 years, he scored 40 goals in 80 appearances and was voted the 2018–19 Brentford B Players' Player of the Year. Hardy gave a man of the match performance and scored two goals in Brentford B's 4–0 2019 Middlesex Senior Cup Final victory over Harrow Borough on 16 April 2019. He was frozen out of the B team during the first half of the 2019–20 season and departed the club in January 2020.

=== Liverpool ===
After an attempt to sign him during the 2019 summer transfer window had failed, Hardy transferred to the U23 team at Premier League club Liverpool in January 2020. He signed a contract running until the end of the 2019–20 season for an undisclosed fee. On 4 February, Hardy made his professional debut as a substitute for Liam Millar after 82 minutes of a 1–0 FA Cup fourth round replay win over Shrewsbury Town.

Hardy signed a one-year contract extension in June 2020, but missed the 2020–21 pre-season through injury. After returning to fitness, he was included in Liverpool's 25-man 2020–21 Premier League squad as a home grown player, though he did not win a call into a matchday squad during the season. After making five appearances and scoring one goal for the U23 and EFL Trophy squads, Hardy was sidelined for 2 1/2 months with an ankle ligament injury sustained during a Premier League 2 match versus Southampton U23 on 21 November 2020. He finished the 2020–21 U23 season with 6 goals in 12 appearances and was released when his contract expired.

=== Accrington Stanley ===
On 8 July 2021, Hardy signed a two-year contract with League One club Accrington Stanley on a free transfer. He suffered a calf injury in pre-season, which required surgery and he returned to full training in late November. On 27 January 2022, Hardy joined Scottish Championship club Inverness Caledonian Thistle on loan until the end of the 2021–22 season. In a season which concluded with defeat in the Scottish Premiership playoff Final, Hardy made 18 appearances and scored his first senior goal, in a 4–0 win over Hamilton Academical on 29 April 2022.

Hardy was again absent from the matchday squad throughout the 2022–23 season and on 17 March 2023, he joined Northern Premier League Premier Division club Marine on loan until the end of the campaign. He scored four goals in eight appearances and was a part of the Liverpool Senior Cup-winning squad. Hardy was released when his contract expired. He failed to win a call into a matchday squad during his two seasons at the Crown Ground.

=== Bootle ===
Hardy began the 2023–24 season with Northern Premier League First Division West club Bootle. He made five appearances without scoring during the opening month of the season and then retired as a player.

== Coaching career ==
After retiring as a player in 2023, Hardy began coaching at youth level within the City Football Group. He has a UEFA B Licence. As of August 2025, Hardy was assistant to head coach Steven Jackson at the Manchester City Football School at the British School Jakarta.

== Personal life ==
Hardy attended St Winefride's Catholic Primary School in Neston and St. Anselm's College in Birkenhead.

== Career statistics ==
Appearances and goals by club, season and competition
Club	Season	League			National cup (Note: Includes FA Cup)		League cup (Note: Includes EFL Cup)		Europe		Other		Total	
Club	Season	Division	Apps	Goals	Apps	Goals	Apps	Goals	Apps	Goals	Apps	Goals	Apps	Goals
Liverpool	2019–20	Premier League	0	0	1	0	—		0	0	—		1	0
Liverpool U21	2020–21	—									1 (Note: Appearance in EFL Trophy)	0	1	0
Inverness Caledonian Thistle (loan)	2021–22	Scottish Championship	12	1	—		—		—		6 (Note: Appearances in Scottish Premiership play-offs)	0	18	1
Marine (loan)	2022–23	Northern Premier League Premier Division	8	4	—		—		—		1 (Note: Appearance in Liverpool Senior Cup)	0	9	4
Bootle	2023–24	Northern Premier League First Division West	5	0	0	0	—		—		0	0	5	0
Total			25	5	1	0	0	0	0	0	8	0	34	5

== Honours ==
Brentford B

- Middlesex Senior Cup: 2018–19

Marine

- Liverpool Senior Cup: 2022–23

Individual

- Brentford B Players' Player of the Year: 2018–19
