= 2019–20 Scottish Championship =

Scottish Championship
- Season: 2019–20
- Dates: 3 August 2019 – 15 April 2020
- Champions: Dundee United
- Promoted: Dundee United
- Relegated: Partick Thistle
- Matches: 137
- Goals: 364 (2.66 per match)
- Top goalscorer: Lawrence Shankland (24 goals)
- Biggest home win: Dundee United 6–0 Greenock Morton (28 September 2019)
- Biggest away win: Queen of the South 0–4 Greenock Morton (29 February 2020)
- Highest scoring: Dundee United 6–2 Dundee (30 August 2019); Greenock Morton 4–4 Alloa Athletic (22 February 2020)
- Longest winning run: 9 matches: Dundee United
- Longest unbeaten run: 13 matches: Dundee United
- Longest winless run: 10 matches: Queen of the South
- Longest losing run: 5 matches: Dunfermline Athletic
- Highest attendance: 14,108; Dundee United 6–2 Dundee (30 August 2019)
- Lowest attendance: 661; Alloa Athletic 0–1 Arbroath (24 August 2019)
- Total attendance: 414,131
- Average attendance: 3,022(98)
- All statistics correct as of 1 May 2020.

The 2019–20 Scottish Championship (known as Ladbrokes Championship for sponsorship reasons) was the 26th season in the current format of 10 teams in the second-tier of Scottish football. Ten teams contested the league: Alloa Athletic, Arbroath, Ayr United, Dundee, Dundee United, Dunfermline Athletic, Greenock Morton, Inverness Caledonian Thistle, Partick Thistle and Queen of the South.

The season began on 3 August 2019 and was scheduled to end on 2 May 2020. On 13 March 2020 all SPFL leagues were indefinitely suspended due to the COVID-19 pandemic in Scotland. On 8 April 2020, the SPFL proposed to end the 2019–20 season by utilising a points per game ratio to determine the final standings. The plan was approved on 15 April 2020, declaring that the season was over, as Dundee United were declared title winners with Partick Thistle relegated to League One. Partick Thistle joined Heart of Midlothian F.C. (which had been relegated from the Scottish Premiership under similar circumstances) in suing the Scottish Professional Football League on the grounds that their relegation was unfair; Partick was two points behind the second-to-last-place team but had played one less game. Ultimately, the lawsuit failed and Partick and Hearts were indeed relegated.

== Teams ==
The following teams have changed division since the 2018–19 season:

To Championship

Arbroath secured promotion to the Championship on 13 April 2019. Dundee were relegated from the Premiership on 4 May 2019.

From Championship

Ross County secured promotion to the Premiership on 26 April 2019. Falkirk were relegated to League One on 3 May 2019.

=== Stadia and locations ===
Alloa Athletic	Arbroath	Ayr United	Dundee
Recreation Park	Gayfield Park	Somerset Park	Dens Park
Capacity: 3,100	Capacity: 6,600	Capacity: 10,185	Capacity: 11,775
Dundee United	Location of teams in 2019–20 Scottish Championship		Dunfermline Athletic
Tannadice Park	Location of teams in 2019–20 Scottish Championship		East End Park
Capacity: 14,223	Location of teams in 2019–20 Scottish Championship		Capacity: 11,480
Greenock Morton	Inverness Caledonian Thistle	Partick Thistle	Queen of the South
Cappielow	Caledonian Stadium	Firhill Stadium	Palmerston Park
Capacity: 11,589	Capacity: 7,750	Capacity: 10,102	Capacity: 8,690

=== Personnel and kits ===
Team	Manager	Captain	Kit manufacturer	Shirt sponsor
Alloa Athletic	(Scotland) Peter Grant	(Scotland) Andy Graham	Pendle	Northern Gas and Power
Arbroath	(Scotland) Dick Campbell	(Scotland) Mark Whatley	Pendle	Megatech
Ayr United	(Scotland) Mark Kerr	(Scotland) Ross Docherty	Adidas	Bitcoin BCH
Dundee	(Northern Ireland) James McPake	(England) Josh Meekings	Macron	Switch Gas & Electric
Dundee United	(Scotland) Robbie Neilson	(Scotland) Mark Reynolds	Macron	Utilita
Dunfermline Athletic	(Scotland) Stevie Crawford	(Northern Ireland) Paul Paton	Joma	SRJ Windows
Greenock Morton	(Scotland) David Hopkin	(Scotland) Jim McAlister	est 1874	Millions
Inverness CT	(Scotland) John Robertson	(England) Carl Tremarco	Erreà	McEwan Fraser Legal
Partick Thistle	(Scotland) Ian McCall	(Scotland) Thomas O'Ware	Joma	Just Employment Law
Queen of the South	(Scotland) Allan Johnston	(Scotland) Stephen Dobbie	Macron	BB Body Repairers

=== Managerial changes ===
Team	Outgoing manager	Manner of departure	Date of vacancy	Position in table	Incoming manager	Date of appointment
Alloa Athletic	(Republic of Ireland) Jim Goodwin	Signed by St Mirren	29 June 2019	Pre-season	(Scotland) Peter Grant	10 July 2019
Partick Thistle	(Scotland) Gary Caldwell	Sacked	18 September 2019	9th	(Scotland) Ian McCall	23 September 2019
Ayr United	(Scotland) Ian McCall	Signed by Partick Thistle	23 September 2019	2nd	(Scotland) Sandy Stewart (interim)	23 September 2019
Ayr United	(Scotland) Sandy Stewart	End of interim	22 October 2019	2nd	(Scotland) Mark Kerr	22 October 2019

== League summary ==
=== League table ===
Pos	Team	Pld	W	D	L	GF	GA	GD	Pts	PPG	Promotion, qualification or relegation (Note: All play-off matches were cancelled, as clubs voted to curtail the season due to the COVID-19 pandemic in Scotland.)
1	Dundee United (C, P)	28	18	5	5	52	22	+30	59	2.11	Promotion to the Premiership
2	Inverness Caledonian Thistle	27	14	3	10	39	32	+7	45	1.67	
3	Dundee	27	11	8	8	32	31	+1	41	1.52	
4	Ayr United	27	12	4	11	38	35	+3	40	1.48	
5	Arbroath	26	10	6	10	24	26	−2	36	1.38	
6	Dunfermline Athletic	28	10	7	11	41	36	+5	37	1.32	
7	Greenock Morton	28	10	6	12	45	52	−7	36	1.29	
8	Alloa Athletic	28	7	10	11	33	43	−10	31	1.11	
9	Queen of the South	28	7	7	14	28	40	−12	28	1.00	
10	Partick Thistle (R)	27	6	8	13	32	47	−15	26	0.96	Relegation to League One

Source: SPFL
Rules for classification: 1) Points per game.
(C) Champions; (P) Promoted; (R) Relegated

== Results ==
Teams play each other four times, twice in the first half of the season (home and away) and twice in the second half of the season (home and away), making a total of 180 games, with each team playing 36.

=== First half of season (Matches 1–18) ===
Home \ Away	ALL	ARB	AYR	DUN	DNU	DNF	GMO	INV	PAR	QOS
Alloa Athletic	—	0–1	1–4	0–3	1–0	2–1	0–2	0–2	1–1	2–2
Arbroath	2–1	—	0–3	1–1	0–1	1–0	1–0	3–0	1–1	0–0
Ayr United	2–1	1–1	—	1–2	2–0	0–1	4–2	0–2	4–1	1–0
Dundee	2–1	2–0	1–0	—	0–2	4–3	2–1	0–0	1–3	1–2
Dundee United	2–1	2–1	4–0	6–2	—	2–0	6–0	4–1	1–0	3–0
Dunfermline Athletic	1–1	2–0	3–2	2–2	0–2	—	3–1	0–1	5–1	2–0
Greenock Morton	4–1	1–0	2–3	1–0	1–2	1–1	—	2–1	3–2	2–2
Inverness CT	2–2	2–1	2–0	1–0	0–3	2–0	5–0	—	1–3	2–0
Partick Thistle	1–1	1–3	2–3	0–1	1–2	0–3	2–1	3–1	—	0–1
Queen of the South	0–1	2–0	3–1	1–1	4–0	1–1	1–0	0–2	1–2	—

Source: Scottish Championship
Legend: Blue = home team win; Yellow = draw; Red = away team win.

=== Second half of season (Matches 19–36) ===
Home \ Away	ALL	ARB	AYR	DUN	DNU	DNF	GMO	INV	PAR	QOS
Alloa Athletic	—	2–0	0–2	N/A	0–0	N/A	N/A	2–0	1–1	N/A
Arbroath	N/A	—	N/A	N/A	N/A	0–0	1–2	N/A	2–1	2–0
Ayr United	N/A	N/A	—	0–0	0–0	N/A	1–2	1–0	N/A	1–2
Dundee	0–0	N/A	2–0	—	N/A	N/A	N/A	0–2	2–0	N/A
Dundee United	N/A	0–1	N/A	1–1	—	N/A	1–1	2–1	1–1	N/A
Dunfermline Athletic	1–3	N/A	0–1	2–0	2–0	—	1–2	N/A	N/A	1–1
Greenock Morton	4–4	1–1	N/A	1–1	N/A	3–2	—	N/A	1–2	N/A
Inverness CT	1–1	0–1	N/A	N/A	N/A	N/A	3–2	—	N/A	3–1
Partick Thistle	N/A	N/A	1–1	N/A	1–4	1–1	N/A	N/A	—	0–0
Queen of the South	2–3	N/A	N/A	0–1	0–1	2–3	0–4	N/A	N/A	—

Source: Scottish Championship
Legend: Blue = home team win; Yellow = draw; Red = away team win.

== Season statistics ==
=== Scoring ===
==== Top scorers ====
Rank	Player	Club	Goals
1	(Scotland) Lawrence Shankland	Dundee United	24
2	(Scotland) Kevin Nisbet	Dunfermline Athletic	18
3	(Scotland) Kevin O'Hara	Alloa Athletic	10
3	(Scotland) Alan Forrest	Ayr United	10
3	(England) Kane Hemmings	Dundee	10
6	(Scotland) Alan Trouten	Alloa Athletic	8
6	(Scotland) Bob McHugh	Greenock Morton	8
6	(Scotland) Stephen Dobbie	Queen of the South	8
9	(Scotland) Nicky Clark	Dundee United	7
9	(Scotland) Jordan White	Inverness CT	7

==== Hat-tricks ====
Player	For	Against	Score	Date	Ref
(Scotland) Lawrence Shankland^{4}	Dundee United	Inverness CT	4–1 (H)	3 August 2019	
(Scotland) Bob McHugh	Greenock Morton	Alloa Athletic	4–1 (H)	10 August 2019	
(Scotland) Lawrence Shankland	Dundee United	Greenock Morton	6–0 (H)	28 September 2019	
(Scotland) Kevin Nisbet^{4}	Dunfermline Athletic	Partick Thistle	5–1 (H)	30 November 2019	
(Scotland) Lawrence Shankland	Dundee United	Partick Thistle	4–1 (A)	11 January 2020	

Note

^{4} Player scored four goals

=== Attendances ===
Pos	Team	Total	High	Low	Average	Change
1	Alloa Athletic	16,216	1,827	661	1,158	−1.7%
2	Arbroath (Note: Club was playing in League One during the previous season.)	19,006	4,052	801	1,462	+53.9%
3	Ayr United	24,891	3,167	777	1,777	−17.6%
4	Dundee (Note: Club was playing in Premiership during the previous season.)	68,603	11,233	4,228	5,277	−12.4%
5	Dundee United	118,950	14,108	6,929	8,496	+67.3%
6	Dunfermline Athletic	62,275	6,480	3,397	4,151	−17.1%
7	Greenock Morton	22,499	2,742	1,120	1,607	−17.3%
8	Inverness Caledonian Thistle	27,518	2,902	1,760	2,116	−17.0%
9	Partick Thistle	35,084	4,101	1,714	2,698	−11.3%
10	Queen of the South	19,549	2,041	1,094	1,396	−15.6%
	League total	414,131	14,108	661	3,022	−3.1%

== Awards ==
=== Monthly awards ===
Month	Manager of the Month		Player of the Month		Ref.
Month	Manager	Club	Player	Club	Ref.
August	(Scotland) Robbie Neilson	Dundee United	(Scotland) Lawrence Shankland	Dundee United	
September	(Scotland) Ian McCall	Ayr United; Partick Thistle	(Scotland) Alan Forrest	Ayr United	
October	(Northern Ireland) James McPake	Dundee	(Scotland) Declan McDaid	Dundee	
November	(Scotland) Robbie Neilson	Dundee United	(Scotland) Kevin Nisbet	Dunfermline Athletic	
December	(Scotland) Robbie Neilson	Dundee United	(England) Calum Butcher	Dundee United	
January	(Scotland) Peter Grant	Alloa Athletic	(Scotland) Kevin O'Hara	Alloa Athletic	
February	(Scotland) David Hopkin	Greenock Morton	(Scotland) Nicky Cadden	Greenock Morton	
