= 2024–25 Inverness Caledonian Thistle F.C. season =

Inverness Caledonian Thistle
2024–25 season
- Chairman: Ross Morrison (until 2 June); Panos Thomas (31 July to 3 October); Scott Young (from 3 October)
- Head coach: Duncan Ferguson (until 23 October); Scott Kellacher (from 23 October)
- Stadium: Caledonian Stadium (Capacity: 7,512)
- League One: 7th
- Scottish Cup: Third Round; lost 0-2 to Cove Rangers
- League Cup: Group Stage
- Challenge Cup: Fourth Round; lost 5–4 on penalties to Livingston
- Top goalscorer: League: Keith Bray (10); All: Keith Bray (11)
- Highest home attendance: 2,329 vs Arbroath (26 April 2025)
- Lowest home attendance: 682; vs. Bonnyrigg Rose, 20 July 2024
- Average home league attendance: 1,694
| Home colours | Third colours |

The 2024–25 Inverness Caledonian Thistle season was the club's 31st season in the SPFL and was the club's first season in League One since the 1998–99 season where they got promoted as runner-up in the old Second Division.

== Events ==
13 July: Inverness played their first competitive game since relegation and lose 1–0 at Annan Athletic

3 August: Inverness drew 1–1 at home against Dumbarton in their first game in the third tier since 1999

13 August: After writing off loans, the club suspended the takeover of Seventy7 Ventures and appointed Alan Savage who was the chairman from 2006 to 2008 as an advisor while Scot Gardiner left the club.

1 October: The club put up a Save ICT crowdfunder, in order to raise £200,000 by October 16 to avoid administration.

18 October: Despite holding talks with multiple potential investors, most notably Anders Holch Povlsen, the owner of Danish football club FC Midtjylland, it was announced that Inverness would be heading into administration, becoming the first football club in Scotland to do so since Heart of Midlothian in 2013.

22 October: Caley Thistle appointed James Stephen, Malcolm Cohen and Shane Crooks at BDO as joint administrators at the club and were deducted 15 points dropping them to last place at -3 points 12 behind 9th placed Dumbarton.

23 October: A day after entering administration, the club sacked Head Coach Duncan Ferguson, Assistant Head Coach Gary Bollan and Goalkeeping coach Stuart Garden and appointed first team coach Scott Kellacher as head coach.

24 October: As they started to clear debts after entering administration, Cameron Ferguson, Wallace Duffy, Adam Brooks, Jack Newman and Flynn Duffy left the club with immediate effect following the ongoing review of the financial position with the Joint Administrators.

26 October: Four days after entering administration, Inverness lost their first game after administration at Dumbarton losing 3-1.

30 October: After being named assistant player-manager, club captain Billy McKay relinquished his captaincy role to Danny Devine.

4 November: It was announced that the club have confirmed that they have received expressions of interest from 20 parties following the commencement of the sale process for the club.

9 November: Inverness beat Cove Rangers 2-1 and moved into positive points.

13 November: The club was denied battery site plan approval due to the project does not comply with Highland Council local development plans.

19 November: The club moved off the bottom of the league table to ninth place after 8th place Dunbarton went into administration.

23 November: The club game against Queen of the South was postponed due to a waterlog pitch it was rescheduled to 21 January.

30 November: Inverness were eliminated from the Scottish Cup after losing two late goals in a 2–0 defeat to Cove Rangers.

7 December: After falling two behind after 38 minutes, Inverness came back and scored three unanswered goals to beat ten-man Montrose 3–2 with two of the goals coming from Paul Allan.

10 December: Head Coach Scott Kellacher was named manager of the month in League One after gaining 7 points out of a possible nine against Kelty Hearts, Cove Rangers and Alloa Athletic.

18 December: Financial Consultant Alan Savage said that the club will not exit administration before February.

4 January: Inverness made their first two signings in the transfer window signing Alfie Bavidge and Alfie Stewart both on loan from Premiership side Aberdeen and both made their debuts later that day and Bavidge also recorded a goal in a 2–0 win over fellow administration side Dumbarton to move whitin 7 points of eight placed Annan.

10 January: The club game at Annan was postponed due to a frozen pitch it was rescheduled to 18 January.

14 February: The club game against league leaders Stenhousemuir was postponed due to a frozen pitch.

8 March: Club moved out of the relegation zone for the first time since entering administration in October after a late Alfie Bavidge goal against Dumbarton.

11 March: Inverness beat Stenhousemuir 4–1 to move five points clear of the bottom two.

17 March: It was revealed that the club have not found an offer to get the club out of administration.

28 March: Advisor Alan Savage makes a bid to get the club out of administration.

10 April: Alan Savage was the preferred bidder to buy the club out of administration.

26 April: Inverness beat Arbroath 3–0 coupled with Dumbarton beating Annan, Inverness secured League One football for the second straight season.

3 May: Inverness beat Montrose 2–0 to finish the league season 7th, 7 points clear of the relegation play-off position.

== Fixtures ==
=== Friendlies ===
| 29 June 2024 Friendly | Clachnacuddin | 0 – 2 | Inverness Caledonian Thistle | Inverness |
| 14:00 | | | Brooks 57', MacKay 83' | Stadium: Grant Street Park |

| 2 July 2024 Friendly | Nairn County | 1 – 3 | Inverness Caledonian Thistle | Nairn |
| 19:30 | Wright 74' | | Mckay 20', Thompson 30', MacKay 76' | Stadium: Station Park |

| 6 July 2024 Friendly | Raith Rovers | 1 – 0 | Inverness Caledonian Thistle | Kirkcaldy |
| 14:00 | Hanlon 86' | | | Stadium: Stark's Park |

| 9 July 2024 Friendly | Brora Rangers | 4 – 1 | Inverness Caledonian Thistle | Brora |
| 19:30 | Dingwall 13', 79'; Ewan 26', MacRae 51' | | Keogh 42' | Stadium: Dudgeon Park |

| 18 February 2025 Friendly | Nairn County | 0 – 2 | Inverness Caledonian Thistle | Nairn |
| 19:30 | | | Keogh 60', Cairns 89' | Stadium: Nairn Academy; Attendance: 0 |
Note: Game held behind closed doors

=== League One ===
| 3 August 2024 League One | Inverness Caledonian Thistle | 1 – 1 | Dumbarton | Inverness |
| 15:00 | Devine 44' | Report | Pignatiello 79'; Niang (yellow card) 55' 79' (yellow-red card) | Stadium: Caledonian Stadium; Attendance: 1,439 |

| 10 August 2024 League One | Annan Athletic | 1 – 0 | Inverness Caledonian Thistle | Annan |
| 15:00 | Goss (pen.), 50' | Report | | Stadium: Galabank; Attendance: 386 |

| 17 August 2024 League One | Inverness Caledonian Thistle | 1 – 1 | Montrose | Inverness |
| 15:00 | Mackinnon 63' | Report | Hester 20'; Dillon (yellow card) 34' 45+1' (yellow-red card) | Stadium: Caledonian Stadium; Attendance: 1,902 |

| 24 August 2024 League One | Kelty Hearts | 0 – 0 | Inverness Caledonian Thistle | Kelty |
| 15:00 | | Report | | Stadium: New Central Park; Attendance: 692 |

| 31 August 2024 League One | Inverness Caledonian Thistle | 1 – 0 | Queen of the South | Inverness |
| 15:00 | Mckay 19' | Report | | Stadium: Caledonian Stadium; Attendance: 1,703 |

| 14 September 2024 League One | Alloa Athletic | 2 – 2 | Inverness Caledonian Thistle | Alloa |
| 15:00 | Sammon 70', Donnelly 73' | Report | Devine 7', MacLeod 67' | Stadium: Indodrill Stadium |

| 21 September 2024 League One | Inverness Caledonian Thistle | 1 – 1 | Cove Rangers | Inverness |
| 15:00 | Nolan 51' | Report | Emslie 21' | Stadium: Caledonian Stadium; Attendance: 1,505 |

| 28 September 2024 League One | Inverness Caledonian Thistle | 0 – 0 | Stenhousemuir | Inverness |
| 15:00 | | Report | | Stadium: Caledonian Stadium; Attendance: 1,601 |

| 5 October 2024 League One | Arbroath | 1 – 0 | Inverness Caledonian Thistle | Arbroath |
| 15:00 | Reilly 67', Watson (yellow card) 90+3' (yellow-red card) | Report | | Stadium: Gayfield Park; Attendance: 1,381 |

| 19 October 2024 League One | Inverness Caledonian Thistle | 1 – 0 | Annan Athletic | Inverness |
| 15:00 | Devine 21' | Report | | Stadium: Caledonian Stadium; Attendance: 1,501 |

| 26 October 2024 League One | Dumbarton | 3 – 1 | Inverness Caledonian Thistle | Dumbarton |
| 15:00 | Hilton 14', 72', Blair 63' | Report | Davidson 28' | Stadium: Dumbarton Football Stadium; Attendance: 872 |

| 2 November 2024 League One | Inverness Caledonian Thistle | 1 – 1 | Kelty Hearts | Inverness |
| 15:00 | Longstaff 4' | Report | Cunningham 14' | Stadium: Caledonian Stadium; Attendance: 1,502 |

| 9 November 2024 League One | Cove Rangers | 1 – 2 | Inverness Caledonian Thistle | Aberdeen |
| 15:00 | Megginson 10' | Report | Mackinnon 39', Bray 67' | Stadium: Balmoral Stadium; Attendance: 551 |

| 16 November 2024 League One | Inverness Caledonian Thistle | 1 – 0 | Alloa Athletic | Inverness |
| 15:00 | Gilmour 70' | Report | | Stadium: Caledonian Stadium; Attendance: 1,578 |

| 23 November 2024 League One | Queen of the South | P – P | Inverness Caledonian Thistle | Dumfries |
| 15:00 | | | | Stadium: Palmerston Park |
Note: Postponed due to waterlogged pitch

| 7 December 2024 League One | Montrose | 2 – 3 | Inverness Caledonian Thistle | Montrose |
| 15:00 | Webster 27', Lyons 38' | Report | Longstaff 64', Allan 88', 90+4' | Stadium: Links Park; Attendance: 502 |

| 14 December 2024 League One | Inverness Caledonian Thistle | 0 – 2 | Arbroath | Inverness |
| 15:00 | Thompson (yellow card) 36' (yellow-red card) | Report | Smith 52', Reilly 90+3' | Stadium: Caledonian Stadium; Attendance: 1,531 |

| 21 December 2024 League One | Stenhousemuir | 0 – 1 | Inverness Caledonian Thistle | Stenhousemuir |
| 15:00 | | Report | Gilmour 86' | Stadium: Ochilview Park; Attendance: 719 |

| 28 December 2024 League One | Inverness Caledonian Thistle | 1 – 4 | Cove Rangers | Inverness |
| 15:00 | Savage 37' | Report | Glass 5', Megginson 18', Darge 49', Emslie 90+2' | Stadium: Caledonian Stadium; Attendance: 1,974 |

| 4 January 2025 League One | Inverness Caledonian Thistle | 2 – 0 | Dumbarton | Inverness |
| 15:00 | Bavidge 15', Gilmour 68' | Report | | Stadium: Caledonian Stadium; Attendance: 1,894 |

| 11 January 2025 League One | Annan Athletic | P – P | Inverness Caledonian Thistle | Annan |
| 15:00 | | | | Stadium: Galabank |
Note: Postponed due to frozen pitch

| 18 January 2025 League One | Annan Athletic | 0 – 3 | Inverness Caledonian Thistle | Annan |
| 15:00 | | Report | Bavidge 40', Bray 49', McKay (pen.), 87' | Stadium: Galabank; Attendance: 438 |
Note: Rescheduled due to frozen pitch on January 11

| 21 January 2025 League One | Queen of the South | 3 – 2 | Inverness Caledonian Thistle | Dumfries |
| 19:45 | Brooks 11', 53', Allan 79' | Report | Bavidge 9', Bray 74' | Stadium: Palmerston Park; Attendance: 774 |
Note: Rescheduled due to waterlogged pitch on November 23

| 25 January 2025 League One | Alloa Athletic | 1 – 2 | Inverness Caledonian Thistle | Alloa |
| 15:00 | O'Donnell 46' | Report | Bray 21', Stewart 79' | Stadium: Indodrill Stadium; Attendance: 741 |

| 1 February 2025 League One | Inverness Caledonian Thistle | 1 – 0 | Queen of the South | Inverness |
| 15:00 | Bavidge 36' | Report | Brydon (yellow card) 84' (yellow-red card) | Stadium: Caledonian Stadium; Attendance: 1,726 |

| 8 February 2025 League One | Arbroath | 3 – 0 | Inverness Caledonian Thistle | Arbroath |
| 15:00 | Steele 26', Winter (pen.), 42', Dow 70' | Report | | Stadium: Gayfield Park; Attendance: 1,500 |

| 15 February 2025 League One | Inverness Caledonian Thistle | P – P | Stenhousemuir | Inverness |
| 14:00 | | | | Stadium: Caledonian Stadium |
Note: Postponed due to frozen pitch

| 22 February 2025 League One | Kelty Hearts | 0 – 1 | Inverness Caledonian Thistle | Kelty |
| 15:00 | | Report | Bavidge 73' | Stadium: New Central Park; Attendance: 641 |

| 1 March 2025 League One | Inverness Caledonian Thistle | 1 – 1 | Montrose | Inverness |
| 15:00 | Bray 80' | Report | Sandilands 34' | Stadium: Caledonian Stadium; Attendance: 1,653 |

| 8 March 2025 League One | Dumbarton | 0 – 1 | Inverness Caledonian Thistle | Dumbarton |
| 15:00 | | Report | Bavidge 90+3' | Stadium: Dumbarton Football Stadium; Attendance: 757 |

| 11 March 2025 League One | Inverness Caledonian Thistle | 4 – 1 | Stenhousemuir | Inverness |
| 19:45 | Brannan 3', Gilmour 17', Bray 47', Allan 51' | Report | O'Reilly 10' | Stadium: Caledonian Stadium |
Note: Rescheduled due to frozen pitch on February 15; Kickoff delayed to 20:20 due to referee injury

| 15 March 2025 League One | Inverness Caledonian Thistle | 0 – 1 | Annan Athletic | Inverness |
| 15:00 | | Report | Smith 3' | Stadium: Caledonian Stadium; Attendance: 1,703 |

| 22 March 2025 League One | Inverness Caledonian Thistle | 1 – 1 | Alloa Athletic | Inverness |
| 15:00 | Stewart 8' | Report | Taggart 52' | Stadium: Caledonian Stadium; Attendance: 1,655 |

| 29 March 2025 League One | Queen of the South | 4 – 1 | Inverness Caledonian Thistle | Dumfries |
| 15:00 | Hannan 29', Allan 57', Brooks 68', 89' | Report | Stewart 29' | Stadium: Palmerston Park; Attendance: 1,006 |

| 5 April 2025 League One | Cove Rangers | 0 – 3 | Inverness Caledonian Thistle | Aberdeen |
| 15:00 | | Report | Bray 13', 36', 72' | Stadium: Balmoral Stadium; Attendance: 454 |

| 12 April 2025 League One | Inverness Caledonian Thistle | 0 – 2 | Kelty Hearts | Inverness |
| 15:00 | | Report | McCarvel 79', Cole 87' | Stadium: Caledonian Stadium; Attendance: 1,812 |

| 19 April 2025 League One | Stenhousemuir | 1 – 1 | Inverness Caledonian Thistle | Stenhousemuir |
| 15:00 | Gilmour 90+1' (own goal) | Report | Mckay 56' | Stadium: Ochilview Park; Attendance: 764 |

| 26 April 2025 League One | Inverness Caledonian Thistle | 3 – 0 | Arbroath | Inverness |
| 15:00 | Bray 9', Allan (pen.), 24', Mckay 48' | Report | | Stadium: Caledonian Stadium; Attendance: 2,329 |

| 3 May 2025 League One | Montrose | 0 – 2 | Inverness Caledonian Thistle | Montrose |
| 15:00 | | Report | Allan 45+2', Mckay 61' | Stadium: Links Park; Attendance: 1,018 |

=== Scottish Cup ===
| 30 November 2024 Third Round | Cove Rangers | 2 – 0 | Inverness Caledonian Thistle | Balmoral Stadium |
| 15:00 | Glass (pen.), 89', McGrath 90+6' | Report | | Attendance: 533 |

=== League Cup ===
As with other sides that failed to qualify for European Competition, Inverness will be drawn into the Premier Sports Cup Group Stage on 29 May 2024. Inverness were drawn into Group D with Annan Athletic and Arbroath of League One, Bonnyrigg Rose of League Two, and Dundee of the Premiership.

| 13 July 2024 Group D | Annan Athletic | 1 – 0 | Inverness Caledonian Thistle | Annan |
| 15:00 | Goss 21' | | | Stadium: Galabank Stadium; Attendance: 428 |

| 20 July 2024 Group D | Inverness Caledonian Thistle | 3 – 0 | Bonnyrigg Rose | Inverness |
| 15:00 | Brooks 10', Bray 17', Longstaff 42' | | | Stadium: Caledonian Stadium; Attendance: 682 |

| 23 July 2024 Group D | Inverness Caledonian Thistle | 0 – 0 (3 – 5 p) | Arbroath | Inverness |
| 19:45 | | | | Stadium: Caledonian Stadium; Attendance: 794 |
| | Penalties |
| | Mckay (penalty scored) , Longstaff (penalty missed) , Savage (penalty scored) , Gilmour (penalty scored) | | (penalty scored) Murray, (penalty scored) Callaghan, (penalty scored) Stowe, (penalty scored) Wilkie, (penalty scored) Bisland |

| 27 July 2024 Group D | Dundee | 6 – 0 | Inverness Caledonian Thistle | Brechin |
| 15:00 | Murray 1', 18', 29', Palmer-Houlden 23', 39', Portales 79' | Report | | Stadium: Glebe Park; Attendance: 1,057 |

=== Challenge Cup ===
| 7 September 2024 Third round | Inverness Caledonian Thistle | 3 – 0 | Stirling Albion | Inverness |
| 15:00 | Brooks 29', 38'; Mackinnon 60' | Report | | Stadium: Caledonian Stadium; Attendance: 774 |

| 12 October 2024 Fourth round | Livingston | 2 – 2 (5 – 4 p) | Inverness Caledonian Thistle | Livingston |
| 14:00 | May 17', Pittman 28' | Report | Allan 10', Gilmour 30' | Stadium: Almondvale Stadium; Attendance: 943 |
| | Penalties |
| | Shinnie (penalty scored) McGowan (penalty scored); Winter (penalty scored); Yengi (penalty scored) Kelly (penalty scored) | | (penalty scored) Davidson (penalty scored) Gilmour; (penalty scored) Savage; (penalty scored) Mckay (penalty missed) Thompson |

=== North of Scotland Cup ===
| 21 August 2024 First round | Nairn County | 4 – 1 | Inverness Caledonian Thistle | Nairn |
| | MacLean 5', Dingwall 33', Lisle 55', Wright 59' | | Keogh 64' | Stadium: Station Park |

== First Team Statistics ==
=== League Standings ===
| Pos | Team | Pld | W | D | L | GF | GA | GD | Pts | Promotion, qualification or relegation |
|---|---|---|---|---|---|---|---|---|---|---|
| 5 | Alloa Athletic | 36 | 13 | 12 | 11 | 55 | 47 | +8 | 51 | |
| 6 | Kelty Hearts | 36 | 11 | 11 | 14 | 40 | 46 | −6 | 44 | |
| 7 | Inverness Caledonian Thistle | 36 | 16 | 10 | 10 | 45 | 38 | +7 | 43 (Note: Inverness Caledonian Thistle were deducted 15 points for entering administration.) | |
| 8 | Montrose | 36 | 9 | 13 | 14 | 40 | 49 | −9 | 40 | |
| 9 | Annan Athletic (R) | 36 | 10 | 6 | 20 | 41 | 68 | −27 | 36 | Qualification for the League One play-offs |

Rules for classification: 1) Points; 2) Goal difference; 3) Goals scored; 4) Head-to-to head points; 5) Head-to-head goal difference; 6) Play-off (only for deciding promotion, play-off participation and relegation).
(R) Relegated

=== League Cup Standings ===
| Pos | Team | Pld | W | PW | PL | L | GF | GA | GD | Pts | Qualification | DND | ANN | ARB | ICT | BON |
|---|---|---|---|---|---|---|---|---|---|---|---|---|---|---|---|---|
| 1 | Dundee | 4 | 4 | 0 | 0 | 0 | 18 | 2 | +16 | 12 | Qualification for the second round | — | 3–1 | — | 6–0 | — |
| 2 | Annan Athletic | 4 | 2 | 0 | 1 | 1 | 7 | 5 | +2 | 7 | | — | — | — | 1–0 | 2–2p |
| 3 | Arbroath | 4 | 1 | 1 | 0 | 2 | 1 | 5 | −4 | 5 | | 0–2 | 0–3 | — | — | — |
| 4 | Inverness Caledonian Thistle | 4 | 1 | 0 | 1 | 2 | 3 | 7 | −4 | 4 | | — | — | 0–0p | — | 3–0 |
| 5 | Bonnyrigg Rose | 4 | 0 | 1 | 0 | 3 | 3 | 13 | −10 | 2 | | 1–7 | — | 0–1 | — | — |

Rules for classification: 1) goal difference, 2) goals scored, 3) away goals scored, 4) matches won, 5) away matches won, 6) drawing of lots.

=== Current Squad ===
| No. | Name | Position | Nationality | Place of birth | Date of birth (Age) | Previous club | Date Acquired | Fee | Contract end |
Goalkeepers
| 13 | Szymon Rebilas | GK | (Poland) | | (16) | Academy | 2 August 2024 | Trainee | 31 May 2028 |
| 21 | Musa Dibaga | GK | (The Gambia) | (Spain) Zaragoza | 27 April 2000 (24) | (Scotland) Bo'ness United | 10 August 2024 | Free | 31 May 2025 |
Defenders
| 4 | Jake Davidson | RB | (Scotland) | Stirling | 6 October 2000 (23) | (Scotland) Queen's Park | 1 July 2023 | Free | 31 May 2025 |
| 5 | Remi Savage | CB | (England) | Liverpool | 26 October 2001 (22) | (England) Newcastle United | 25 January 2024 | Free | 31 May 2025 |
| 6 | Danny Devine | CB | (Northern Ireland) | Belfast | 7 September 1992 (31) | (Scotland) Dunfermline Athletic | 17 August 2020 | Free | 31 May 2025 |
| 12 | Matthew Strachan | CB | (Scotland) | Inverness | 3 June 2005 (19) | Academy | 11 July 2022 | Trainee | 31 May 2025 |
| 16 | Jack Walker | CB | (Scotland) | Inverness | 11 January 2006 (18) | Academy | 2 August 2024 | Trainee | 31 May 2025 |
| 17 | Sam Nixon | CB | (Scotland) | Inverness | 17 March 2006 (18) | Academy | 1 July 2023 | Trainee | 31 May 2025 |
| 27 | James Nolan | RB | (England) | Chorley | 2 October 2005 (18) | (England) Manchester United | 30 August 2024 | Loan | 31 May 2025 |
| 29 | Ben Gardiner | CB | (Scotland) | Inverness | | Academy | 14 December 2024 | Trainee | - |
| 33 | Lewis Nicolson | LB | (Scotland) | Inverness | 5 May 2004 (20) | Academy | 1 July 2021 | Trainee | 31 May 2025 |
| - | Connall Ewan | CB | (Scotland) | Inverness | 11 March 2006 (19) | (Scotland) Ross County | 29 August 2024 | Loan | 31 May 2025 |
Midfielders
| 7 | Charlie Gilmour | DM | (Scotland) | (England) Brighton | 11 February 1999 (25) | (Scotland) St. Johnstone | 1 July 2023 | Free | 31 May 2025 |
| 8 | Adam Mackinnon | CM | (Scotland) | Stornoway | 30 April 2003 (21) | (Scotland) Ross County | 2 August 2024 | Free | 31 May 2026 |
| 17 | Calum MacLeod | DM | (Scotland) | Inverness | 25 May 2006 (18) | Academy | 1 July 2023 | Trainee | 31 May 2025 |
| 19 | Shae Keogh | CM | (Scotland) | Inverness | 11 April 2007 (17) | Academy | 2 August 2024 | Trainee | 31 May 2028 |
| 18 | Robbie Thompson | AM | (Scotland) | Inverness | 26 April 2004 (20) | Academy | 1 July 2021 | Trainee | 31 May 2025 |
| 20 | Ben Brannan | CM | (Scotland) | Kilmarnock | 30 January 2007 (18) | (Scotland) Kilmarnock | 20 February 2025 | Loan | 31 May 2025 |
| 22 | Keith Bray | CM | (Scotland) | Aird Tong | 1 April 2006 (18) | (Scotland) Dunfermline Athletic | 3 February 2025 | Loan | 31 May 2025 |
| 24 | Alfie Stewart | RM | (Scotland) | Newtonhill | 31 July 2006 (18) | (Scotland) Aberdeen | 4 January 2024 | Loan | 31 May 2025 |
| 26 | Paul Allan | DM | (Scotland) | Dunfermline | 7 February 2000 (24) | (Scotland) Dunfermline Athletic | 24 August 2024 | Free | 31 May 2025 |
| - | Ben Corner | CM | (Scotland) | Fort William | 2007 (17) | Academy | 2 August 2024 | Trainee | 31 May 2028 |
Forwards
| 9 | Billy Mckay | CF | (Northern Ireland) | (England) Corby | 22 October 1988 (35) | (Scotland) Ross County | 1 July 2021 | Free | 31 May 2025 |
| 10 | Alfie Bavidge | RW | (Scotland) | Aberdeen | 11 April 2006 (18) | (Scotland) Aberdeen | 4 January 2024 | Loan | 31 May 2025 |
| 11 | Luis Longstaff | RW | (England) | Darlington | 24 February 2001 (23) | (Scotland) Cove Rangers | 20 July 2023 | Free | 31 May 2025 |
| - | Ethan Cairns | CF | (Scotland) | Grantown-on-Spey | 17 December 2004 (20) | Academy | 1 July 2021 | Trainee | 31 May 2025 |

=== League Goalscorers ===
(As of match played 3 May 2025, vs Montrose)

| Rank | Player | Goals |
|---|---|---|
| 1st | (Scotland) Keith Bray | 10 |
| 2nd | (Scotland) Alfie Bavidge | 6 |
| 2nd | (Scotland) Paul Allan | 6 |
| 3rd | (Northern Ireland) Billy Mckay | 5 |
| 4th | (England) Luis Longstaff | 3 |
| 4th | (Northern Ireland) Danny Devine | 3 |
| 4th | (Scotland) Alfie Stewart | 3 |
| 4th | (Scotland) Charlie Gilmour | 3 |
| 5th | (Scotland) Adam Mackinnon | 2 |
| 5th | (Scotland) Jake Davidson | 2 |
| 6th | (Scotland) Calum MacLeod | 1 |
| 6th | (England) James Nolan | 1 |
| 6th | (England) Remi Savage | 1 |
| 6th | (Scotland) Ben Brannan | 1 |

=== Overall Goalscorers ===
| Rank | Player | Goals |
|---|---|---|
| 1st | (Scotland) Keith Bray | 11 |
| 2nd | (Scotland) Paul Allan | 7 |
| 3rd | (Scotland) Alfie Bavidge | 6 |
| 4th | (Northern Ireland) Billy Mckay | 5 |
| 5th | (Scotland) Charlie Gilmour | 4 |
| 6th | (Scotland) Adam Brooks | 3 |
| 6th | (Scotland) Adam Mackinnon | 3 |
| 6th | (Northern Ireland) Danny Devine | 3 |
| 6th | (Scotland) Alfie Stewart | 3 |
| 6th | (England) Luis Longstaff | 3 |
| 7th | (Scotland) Jake Davidson | 2 |
| 7th | (Scotland) Luis Longstaff | 2 |
| 8th | (Scotland) Calum MacLeod | 1 |
| 8th | (England) James Nolan | 1 |
| 8th | (England) Remi Savage | 1 |
| 8th | (Scotland) Ben Brannan | 1 |

*players in italics left during the season

=== Hat-tricks ===
| Player | Competition | Score | Opponent | Date |
|---|---|---|---|---|
| (Scotland) Keith Bray | Scottish League One | 0–3 | Cove Rangers | 5 April 2025 |

== Transfers ==
Transfers In
| Player | Age* | Pos | From | Fee | Date | Notes |
|---|---|---|---|---|---|---|
| (Scotland) Cameron Ferguson | 21 | ST | (Scotland) Forres Mechanics | Free | 26 June 2024 | Intended to join in March but failed registration |
| (Scotland) Adam Mackinnon | 21 | MF | (Scotland) Ross County | Free | 2 August 2024 | |
| (Scotland) Flynn Duffy | 20 | DF | (Scotland) Dundee United | Free | 2 August 2024 | |
| (The Gambia) Musa Dibaga | 24 | GK | (Scotland) Bo'ness United | Free | 10 August 2024 | |
| (Scotland) Paul Allan | 24 | MF | (Scotland) Dunfermline Athletic | Free | 24 August 2024 | |

Transfers Out
| Player | Age* | Pos | To | Fee | Date | Notes |
|---|---|---|---|---|---|---|
| (Republic of Ireland) Aaron Doran | 33 | MF | (Scotland) Strathspey Thistle | Free | 31 May 2024 | |
| (Scotland) Lewis Mackie | 17 | DF | (Scotland) Strathspey Thistle | Free | 1 June 2024 | |
| (Scotland) Cameron Mackay | 27 | GK | (Scotland) Brora Rangers | Pre-Contract | 3 June 2024 | |
| (Scotland) Cameron Harper | 22 | DF | (England) Carlisle United | Undisclosed | 14 June 2024 | Six figure transfer fee controversially waived by then CEO Scot Gardiner. |
| (England) Nathan Shaw | 23 | MF | (Scotland) Greenock Morton | Free | 24 June 2024 | |
| (Scotland) Roddy MacGregor | 22 | MF | (Scotland) Queen's Park | Free | 2 July 2024 | |
| (Scotland) Mark Ridgers | 33 | GK | (Scotland) Buckie Thistle | Free | 19 July 2024 | |
| (Australia) Nikola Ujdur | 25 | DF | (Scotland) Queen's Park | Undisclosed | 27 July 2024 | |
| (England) Harry Lodovica | 25 | ST | (England) Maidstone United | Free | 13 September 2024 | |
| (England) Austin Samuels | 23 | ST | (Scotland) Greenock Morton | Free | 11 October 2024 | |
| (Scotland) Flynn Duffy | 21 | DF | (Scotland) Airdrieonians | Free | 2 November 2024 | Released on 24 October by Administrators |
| (Scotland) Wallace Duffy | 25 | DF | (Scotland) Strathspey Thistle | Free | 3 November 2024 | Released on 24 October by Administrators |
| (Scotland) Adam Brooks | 20 | ST | (Scotland) Queen of the South | Free | 14 November 2024 | Released on 24 October by Administrators |
| (Scotland) Cameron Ferguson | 21 | ST | (Wales) Connah's Quay Nomads | Free | 1 February 2025 | Released on 24 October by Administrators |
| (Scotland) Keith Bray | 18 | MF | (Scotland) Dunfermline Athletic | Undisclosed | 3 February 2025 | Loaned back for remainder of season |
| (Scotland) Calum MacKay | 19 | MF | (Scotland) Nairn County | Released | 27 February 2025 | Left by mutual consent |

Loans In/Return
| Player | Age* | Pos | From | Duration | Date In | Date Out | Notes |
|---|---|---|---|---|---|---|---|
| (Scotland) Matthew Strachan | 19 | DF | (Scotland) Brora Rangers | Return | 1 July 2024 | N/A | |
| (Scotland) Jack Walker | 18 | DF | (Scotland) Forres Mechanics | Return | 1 July 2024 | N/A | |
| (Scotland) Sam Nixon | 17 | DF | (Scotland) Forres Mechanics | Return | 1 July 2024 | N/A | |
| (Scotland) Calum MacKay | 19 | MF | (Scotland) Nairn County | Return | 1 July 2024 | N/A | |
| (Scotland) Ethan Cairns | 19 | FW | (Scotland) Banks o' Dee | Return | 1 July 2024 | N/A | |
| (Scotland) Lewis Hyde | 21 | MF | (Scotland) Brora Rangers | Return | 1 July 2024 | N/A | |
| (Scotland) Keith Bray | 18 | MF | (Scotland) Elgin City | Return | 1 July 2024 | N/A | |
| (Scotland) Robbie Thompson | 19 | MF | (Scotland) The Spartans | Return | 1 July 2024 | N/A | |
| (Scotland) Jake Davidson | 23 | MF | (Scotland) Hamilton Academical | Return | 1 July 2024 | N/A | |
| (Scotland) Calum MacLeod | 17 | MF | (Scotland) Clachnacuddin | Return | 1 July 2024 | N/A | |
| (Scotland) Jack Newman | 22 | GK | (Scotland) Dundee United | Season | 27 June 2024 | 24 October 2024 | Loan terminated by Administrators |
| (Scotland) Martin Mackinnon | 24 | GK | (Scotland) Clachnacuddin | Emergency | 17 August 2024 | September 2024 | |
| (Scotland) Connall Ewan | 19 | DF | (Scotland) Ross County | Season | 29 August 2024 | 31 May 2025 | |
| (England) James Nolan | 18 | DF | (England) Manchester United | Season | 30 August 2024 | 31 May 2025 | |
| (Scotland) Charlie Reilly | 22 | FW | (Scotland) Dundee | Half Season | 1 October 2024 | 1 January 2025 | Recalled early for injury recovery |
| (England) Corey Patterson | 18 | GK | (Scotland) Forres Mechanics | Emergency | 14 December 2024 | 1 January 2025 | |
| (Scotland) Jack Walker | 18 | DF | (Scotland) Nairn County | Return | 1 January 2025 | N/A | |
| (Scotland) Alfie Stewart | 18 | MF | (Scotland) Aberdeen | Half Season | 4 January 2025 | 31 May 2025 | |
| (Scotland) Alfie Bavidge | 18 | FW | (Scotland) Aberdeen | Half Season | 4 January 2025 | 31 February 2025 | Recalled early for injury recovery |
| (Scotland) Keith Bray | 19 | MF | (Scotland) Dunfermline Athletic | Half Season | 3 February 2025 | 31 May 2025 | |
| (Scotland) Ben Brannan | 18 | DF | (Scotland) Kilmarnock | Half Season | 20 February 2025 | 31 May 2025 | |
| (Scotland) Aidan Rice | 18 | GK | (Scotland) Celtic | Emergency | 20 March 2025 | 23 March 2025 | Emergency loan to cover Dibaga's international duty |
| (Republic of Ireland) Marcus Gill | 17 | GK | (Scotland) Celtic | Emergency | 18 February 2025 | 3 May 2025 | Emergency loan to cover Dibaga's injury |

Loans Out/Return
| Player | Age* | Pos | To | Duration | Date Out | Date In | Notes |
|---|---|---|---|---|---|---|---|
| (Scotland) Max Anderson | 22 | MF | (Scotland) Dundee | Return | 1 July 2024 | N/A | |
| (Wales) Morgan Boyes | 23 | DF | (Scotland) Livingston | Return | 1 July 2024 | N/A | |
| (England) James Carragher | 21 | DF | (England) Wigan Athletic | Return | 1 July 2024 | N/A | |
| (Wales) Alex Samuel | 28 | FW | (Scotland) Ross County | Return | 1 July 2024 | N/A | |
| (Scotland) Cammy Kerr | 28 | DF | (Scotland) Dundee | Return | 1 July 2024 | N/A | |
| (Northern Ireland) Sean McAllister | 21 | MF | (England) Everton | Return | 1 July 2024 | N/A | |
| (Canada) Aribim Pepple | 21 | FW | (England) Luton Town | Return | 1 July 2024 | N/A | |
| (Nigeria) Samson Lawal | 20 | MF | (Scotland) Livingston | Return | 1 July 2024 | N/A | |
| (Scotland) Sam Nixon | 18 | DF | (Scotland) Forres Mechanics | Short term | 3 August 2024 | 31 May 2025 | Loan extended to end of season |
| (Scotland) Jack Walker | 18 | DF | (Scotland) Nairn County | Short term | 30 August 2024 | 1 January 2025 | |
| (Scotland) Martin Mackinnon | 24 | GK | (Scotland) Clachnacuddin | Return | 13 September 2024 | N/A | |
| (Scotland) Jack Newman | 22 | GK | (Scotland) Dundee United | Return | 24 October 2024 | N/A | Loan terminated by Administrators |

*Age at time of transfer
