= 2023–24 Inverness Caledonian Thistle F.C. season =

Scottish football club season

Inverness Caledonian Thistle
2023–24 season
- Manager: Billy Dodds (until 17 September) Duncan Ferguson (from 26 September)
- Stadium: Caledonian Stadium
- Scottish Championship: 9th; Relegated
- Scottish Cup: Fifth Round; lost 3–1 to Hibernian
- League Cup: Group Stage
- Challenge Cup: Third Round; lost 4–2 to Arbroath
- Highest home attendance: 3,837; vs Hibernian, 10 February 2024
- Lowest home attendance: 983; vs Broomhill, 20 January 2024
Home colours	Away colours

The 2023–24 Inverness Caledonian Thistle season was the club's 29th campaign in the SPFL, and the club's seventh consecutive season in the Scottish Championship.

== Fixtures ==
=== Friendlies ===
8 July 2023 Friendly	Inverness Caledonian Thistle	4 – 1	Elgin City	Inverness
15:00	Doran 6', Samuels 15', 45' Mckay 62'		Cameron 12'	Stadium: Caledonian Stadium; Attendance: 1,040

11 July 2023 Friendly	Nairn County	0 – 6	Inverness Caledonian Thistle	Nairn
19:45			Brooks 6', 7', Tokely (o.g.) 19', Mckay 24', Cairns 55', Samuels 87'	Stadium: Station Park

=== Championship ===
5 August 2023 Scottish Championship	Inverness Caledonian Thistle	1 – 2	Queen's Park	Inverness
15:00	Davidson 86'		Thomas 31', Robson 48'	Stadium: Caledonian Stadium; Attendance: 2,030

12 August 2023 Scottish Championship	Ayr United	1 – 0	Inverness Caledonian Thistle	Ayr
15:00	Amartey 8'			Stadium: Somerset Park; Attendance: 1,989

26 August 2023 Scottish Championship	Airdrieonians	2 – 1	Inverness Caledonian Thistle	Airdrie
15:00	Harper 1' (o.g.), Gallagher 32'		Shaw 70'	Stadium: Excelsior Stadium

2 September 2023 Scottish Championship	Inverness Caledonian Thistle	1 – 1	Dunfermline Athletic	Inverness
15:00	Shaw 12'		Hamilton 80'	Stadium: Caledonian Stadium; Attendance: 2,338

16 September 2023 Scottish Championship	Raith Rovers	1 – 0	Inverness Caledonian Thistle	Kirkcaldy
15:00	Gullan 87'			Stadium: Stark's Park; Attendance: 2,846

23 September 2023 Scottish Championship	Inverness Caledonian Thistle	0 – 1	Dundee United	Inverness
15:00			Tillson (yellow card) 69' (yellow-red card) , Mochrie 90+3'	Stadium: Caledonian Stadium; Attendance: 3,503

30 September 2023 Scottish Championship	Arbroath	2 – 3	Inverness Caledonian Thistle	Arbroath
15:00	Stewart 69', McKenna 79'		Longstaff 10', Doran 31', Mckay 49'	Stadium: Gayfield Park; Attendance: 1,723

7 October 2023 Scottish Championship	Inverness Caledonian Thistle	0 – 0	Partick Thistle	Inverness
15:00				Stadium: Caledonian Stadium; Attendance: 2,364

21 October 2023 Scottish Championship	Greenock Morton	P – P	Inverness Caledonian Thistle	Greenock
15:00				Stadium: Cappielow Park
Note: Postponed due to Storm Babet

28 October 2023 Scottish Championship	Inverness Caledonian Thistle	1 – 0	Airdrieonians	Inverness
15:00	Wotherspoon 37'			Stadium: Caledonian Stadium; Attendance: 2,218

4 November 2023 Scottish Championship	Dundee United	1 – 1	Inverness Caledonian Thistle	Dundee
15:00	Holt 56'		Shaw 50'	Stadium: Tannadice Park; Attendance: 7,602

11 November 2023 Scottish Championship	Inverness Caledonian Thistle	3 – 1	Ayr United	Inverness
15:00	Wotherspoon 32', McAllister 43' (o.g.); Mckay 45+3' (pen.)		Murphy 61' (pen.)	Stadium: Caledonian Stadium; Attendance: 2,259

18 November 2023 Scottish Championship	Dunfermline Athletic	1 – 1	Inverness Caledonian Thistle	Dunfermline
15:00	McCann 87'		Devine 43'	Stadium: East End Park; Attendance: 5,034

2 December 2023 Scottish Championship	Inverness Caledonian Thistle	1 – 2	Raith Rovers	Inverness
15:00	Mckay 61'		Vaughan 86', Gullan 90+4' (pen.)	Stadium: Caledonian Stadium; Attendance: 2,143

9 December 2023 Scottish Championship	Queen's Park	1 – 4	Inverness Caledonian Thistle	Glasgow
15:00	Turner 10'		Anderson 21', Ujdur 59', Wotherspoon 75', Mckay 80' (pen.)	Stadium: Hampden Park; Attendance: 1,203

12 December 2023 Scottish Championship	Greenock Morton	2 – 1	Inverness Caledonian Thistle	Greenock
19:45	Oakley 20'; Baird 80'		Brooks 90+4'	Stadium: Cappielow Park; Attendance: 1,315
Note: Rescheduled from 21 October

16 December 2023 Scottish Championship	Inverness Caledonian Thistle	1 – 2	Arbroath	Inverness
15:00	Mckay 39'		Bird 29'; Gold 42'	Stadium: Caledonian Stadium; Attendance: 1,842

23 December 2023 Scottish Championship	Partick Thistle	1 – 1	Inverness Caledonian Thistle	Glasgow
15:00	McMillan 15'		Anderson 1'	Stadium: Firhill Stadium; Attendance: 3,326

30 December 2023 Scottish Championship	Inverness Caledonian Thistle	0 – 0	Greenock Morton	Inverness
15:00				Stadium: Caledonian Stadium; Attendance: 2,114

2 January 2024 Scottish Championship	Airdrieonians	2 – 0	Inverness Caledonian Thistle	Airdrie
15:00	Todorov 61'; Fordyce 84'			Stadium: Excelsior Stadium

6 January 2024 Scottish Championship	Ayr United	1 – 3	Inverness Caledonian Thistle	Ayr
15:00	Chalmers 65'		Mckay 29'; Boyes 55', 63'	Stadium: Somerset Park; Attendance: 1,826

12 January 2024 Scottish Championship	Inverness Caledonian Thistle	0 – 1	Dundee United	Inverness
19:45			Watt 87'	Stadium: Caledonian Stadium; Attendance: 2,662

27 January 2024 Scottish Championship	Raith Rovers	2 – 3	Inverness Caledonian Thistle	Kirkcaldy
15:00	Hamilton 25'; Vaughan 52'		Samuel 31', 36', 40'	Stadium: Stark's Park; Attendance: 3,387

3 February 2024 Scottish Championship	Inverness Caledonian Thistle	0 – 1	Queen's Park	Inverness
15:00			Thomas 50'	Stadium: Caledonian Stadium; Attendance: 1,962

17 February 2024 Scottish Championship	Inverness Caledonian Thistle	3 – 3	Partick Thistle	Inverness
15:00	Kerr 27'; Savage 54', Shaw 79'; Anderson (red card) 90+2'		Fitzpatrick 64'; Graham 77' (pen.), 86'	Stadium: Caledonian Stadium; Attendance: 2,215

24 February 2024 Scottish Championship	Arbroath	1 – 1	Inverness Caledonian Thistle	Arbroath
15:00	MacKinnon 82'		Harper 90+4'	Stadium: Gayfield Park; Attendance: 1,539

27 February 2024 Scottish Championship	Inverness Caledonian Thistle	0 – 0	Dunfermline Athletic	Inverness
19:45				Stadium: Caledonian Stadium; Attendance: 1,958

2 March 2024 Scottish Championship	Greenock Morton	0 – 2	Inverness Caledonian Thistle	Greenock
15:00			Mckay 2', McAllister 34'	Stadium: Cappielow Park; Attendance: 1,933

9 March 2024 Scottish Championship	Inverness Caledonian Thistle	0 – 0	Airdrieonians	Inverness
15:00				Stadium: Caledonian Stadium; Attendance: 2,035

16 March 2024 Scottish Championship	Inverness Caledonian Thistle	1 – 2	Ayr United	Inverness
15:00	Mckay 45+3' (pen.)		Stanger 5'; Bryden 61'	Stadium: Caledonian Stadium; Attendance: 1,979

23 March 2024 Scottish Championship	Dundee United	1 – 1	Inverness Caledonian Thistle	Dundee
15:00	Moult 55'		Duffy 12'	Stadium: Tannadice Park; Attendance: 7,567

30 March 2024 Scottish Championship	Partick Thistle	1 – 0	Inverness Caledonian Thistle	Glasgow
15:00	Robinson 41'		Kerr (yellow card) 66' (yellow-red card)	Stadium: Firhill Stadium; Attendance: 3,371

6 April 2024 Scottish Championship	Inverness Caledonian Thistle	2 – 1	Arbroath	Inverness
15:00	Duffy 45+3'; Samuel 80'		McIntosh 61'; Little (yellow card) 76' (yellow-red card)	Stadium: Caledonian Stadium; Attendance: 2,223

13 April 2024 Scottish Championship	Queen's Park	0 – 1	Inverness Caledonian Thistle	Glasgow
15:00			Harper 25'	Stadium: Hampden Park; Attendance: 1,463

19 April 2024 Scottish Championship	Inverness Caledonian Thistle	0 – 1	Raith Rovers	Inverness
19:45		Report	Vaughan 49'	Stadium: Caledonian Stadium; Attendance: 2,385

27 April 2024 Scottish Championship	Dunfermline Athletic	1 – 1	Inverness Caledonian Thistle	Dunfermline
15:00	Benedictus 41'	Report	Pepple 75'	Stadium: East End Park; Attendance: 5,317

3 May 2024 Scottish Championship	Inverness Caledonian Thistle	3 – 1	Greenock Morton	Inverness
19:45	Boyes 30'; Harper 56' (pen.); McAllister 62'	Report	Broadfoot 41'; Muirhead (red card) 58'	Stadium: Caledonian Stadium; Attendance: 2,914

=== Championship play-off ===
7 May 2024 Semi-final 1st leg	Montrose	0 – 0	Inverness Caledonian Thistle	Montrose
19:45		Report		Stadium: Links Park; Attendance: 1,043

11 May 2024 Semi-final 2nd leg	Inverness Caledonian Thistle	1 – 0 (1 – 0 agg.)	Montrose	Inverness
15:00	Mckay 59'	Report	Lyons (red card) 84'	Stadium: Caledonian Stadium; Attendance: 2,089

15 May 2024 Final 1st leg	Hamilton Academical	2 – 1	Inverness Caledonian Thistle	Hamilton
19:45	O'Hara 6'; Owens 22'	Report	Pepple 68'	Stadium: New Douglas Park; Attendance: 1,389

18 May 2024 Final 2nd leg	Inverness Caledonian Thistle	2 – 3 (3 – 5 agg.)	Hamilton Academical	Inverness
17:30	Kerr 31'; Samuel 90+8'	Report	O'Hara 8', 41' (pen.); Smith 12'	Stadium: Caledonian Stadium; Attendance: 2,873

=== Scottish Cup ===
25 November 2023 Scottish Cup Third Round	Inverness Caledonian Thistle	2 – 0	Cowdenbeath	Inverness
15:00	Wotherspoon 80'; Mckay 84'			Stadium: Caledonian Stadium; Attendance: 1,037

20 January 2024 Scottish Cup Fourth Round	Inverness Caledonian Thistle	4 – 0	Broomhill	Inverness
15:00	Gilmour 45', Samuel 62', Brooks 73', 88'		Miller (red card) 50'	Stadium: Caledonian Stadium; Attendance: 983

10 February 2024 Fifth Round	Inverness Caledonian Thistle	1 – 3	Hibernian	Inverness
15:00	Doran 90+5'		Maolida 55', Boyle 79', Youan 89'	Stadium: Caledonian Stadium; Attendance: 3,837

=== League Cup ===
15 July 2023 Scottish League Cup Group E	Inverness Caledonian Thistle	2 – 1	Bonnyrigg Rose	Inverness
15:00	Doran 4', 40'		McGachie 90'	Stadium: Caledonian Stadium; Attendance: 1,077

18 July 2023 Scottish League Cup Group E	Dumbarton	2 – 1	Inverness Caledonian Thistle	Dumbarton
19:45	R. Wallace 27', T. Wallace 50'		Mckay 76'	Stadium: Dumbarton Football Stadium

25 July 2023 Scottish League Cup Group E	Inverness Caledonian Thistle	2 – 3	Airdrieonians	Inverness
19:45	Gilmour 62', Mckay 72' (pen.)		Ballantyne 22', Telfer 29', Todorov 88'	Stadium: Caledonian Stadium

30 July 2023 Scottish League Cup Group E	Dundee	1 – 0	Inverness Caledonian Thistle	Dundee
15:00	Robinson 60'			Stadium: Dens Park; Attendance: 2,337

=== Challenge Cup ===
9 September 2023 Third round	Arbroath	4 – 2	Inverness Caledonian Thistle	Arbroath
15:00	Gold 34', O'Brien 41', Stewart 70', Steele 84'		Brooks 43', Lodovica (red card) 63', Hyde 90+3'	Stadium: Gayfield Park

=== Inverness Cup ===
22 August 2023 Inverness Cup	Clachnacuddin	1 – 4	Inverness Caledonian Thistle	Inverness
19:30	Ferguson 64'		Lodovica 16', 36' (pen.), 39', Mackie 75'	Stadium: Grant Street Park

=== North of Scotland Cup ===
27 September 2023 North of Scotland Cup Quarter Final	Rothes	0 – 1	Inverness Caledonian Thistle XI	Rothes
20:00			Bray 9'	Stadium: Mackessack Park

18 October 2023 North of Scotland Cup Semi Final	Nairn County	2 – 2 (7 – 6 p)	Inverness Caledonian Thistle XI	Nairn
20:00	Tokely 45', Mackay 51'		Lodovica 65', 88'	Stadium: Station Park
	Penalties
	MacLeod (penalty scored); Dey (penalty scored); Tokely (penalty scored); Gillies (penalty scored); Young (penalty scored); Robesten (penalty scored); Mackay (penalty scored)		(penalty scored) Davidson; (penalty scored) Walker; (penalty scored) Hyde; (penalty scored) Brooks; (penalty scored) Thompson; (penalty scored) Lodovica; (penalty missed) Delaney

== Team statistics ==
=== League standings ===
Pos	Team	Pld	W	D	L	GF	GA	GD	Pts	Promotion, qualification or relegation
6	Dunfermline Athletic	36	11	12	13	43	48	−5	45	
7	Ayr United	36	12	8	16	53	61	−8	44	
8	Queen's Park	36	11	10	15	50	56	−6	43	
9	Inverness Caledonian Thistle (R)	36	10	12	14	41	40	+1	42	Qualification for the Championship play-offs
10	Arbroath (R)	36	6	5	25	35	89	−54	23	Relegation to League One

Rules for classification: 1) Points; 2) Goal difference; 3) Goals scored; 4) Head-to-to head points; 5) Head-to-head goal difference; 6) Play-off (only for deciding promotion, play-off participation and relegation).
(R) Relegated

== First Team Player Statistics ==
=== League Goalscorers ===
Rank	Player	Goals
1st	(Northern Ireland) Billy Mckay	9
2nd	(England) Nathan Shaw	4
2nd	(Wales) Alex Samuel	4
4th	(Wales) Morgan Boyes	3
4th	(Scotland) Cameron Harper	3
4th	(Canada) David Wotherspoon	3
7th	(Scotland) Max Anderson	2
7th	(Northern Ireland) Sean McAllister	2
7th	(Scotland) Wallace Duffy	2
10th	(Scotland) Jake Davidson	1
10th	(Republic of Ireland) Aaron Doran	1
10th	(England) Luis Longstaff	1
10th	(Northern Ireland) Danny Devine	1
10th	(Australia) Nikola Ujdur	1
10th	(Scotland) Adam Brooks	1
10th	(England) Remi Savage	1
10th	(Scotland) Cammy Kerr	1
10th	(Canada) Aribim Pepple	1

=== Overall Goalscorers ===
Rank	Player	Goals
1st	(Northern Ireland) Billy Mckay	12
2nd	(Wales) Alex Samuel	6
3rd	(Canada) David Wotherspoon	4
3rd	(Scotland) Adam Brooks	4
3rd	(Republic of Ireland) Aaron Doran	4
3rd	(England) Nathan Shaw	4
7th	(Wales) Morgan Boyes	3
7th	(England) Cameron Harper	3
9th	(Scotland) Max Anderson	2
9th	(England) Charlie Gilmour	2
9th	(Scotland) Wallace Duffy	2
9th	(Canada) Aribim Pepple	2
9th	(Northern Ireland) Sean McAllister	2
14th	(Scotland) Jake Davidson	1
14th	(Scotland) Lewis Hyde	1
14th	(England) Luis Longstaff	1
14th	(Northern Ireland) Danny Devine	1
14th	(Australia) Nikola Ujdur	1
14th	(England) Remi Savage	1
14th	(Scotland) Cammy Kerr	1

*players in italics left the club during the season

=== Hat-tricks ===
Player	Competition	Score	Opponent	Date
(England) Harry Lodovica	Inverness Cup	1–4	Clachnacuddin	22 August 2023
(Wales) Alex Samuel	Scottish Championship	2–3	Raith Rovers	27 January 2024

=== Transfers ===
Transfers In
Player	Age*	Pos	From	Fee	Date	Notes
(Scotland) Jake Davidson	22	DF	(Scotland) Queen's Park	Free	16 June 2023	
(England) Charlie Gilmour	24	MF	(Scotland) St Johnstone	Free	20 June 2023	
(Scotland) Adam Brooks	19	MF	(Scotland) Celtic	Free	8 July 2023	
(England) Luis Longstaff	22	MF	(Scotland) Cove Rangers	Free	20 July 2023	
(England) Harry Lodovica	24	ST	(England) Aveley	Free	30 July 2023	
(Scotland) Sam Nixon	17	DF	Academy		10 August 2023	
(Scotland) Calum MacLeod	17	MF	Academy		10 August 2023	
(Scotland) Jack Walker	17	DF	Academy		10 August 2023	
(Australia) Nikola Ujdur	24	DF	(Australia) Rockdale Ilinden	Free	1 September 2023	
(Canada) David Wotherspoon	33	MF	Free Agent	N/A	17 October 2023	Short Term Deal
(Republic of Ireland) Cillian Sheridan	34	ST	Free Agent	N/A	26 October 2023	Short Term Deal
(England) Remi Savage	22	DF	(England) Newcastle United	Free	25 January 2024	

Transfers Out
Player	Age*	Pos	To	Fee	Date	Notes
(Scotland) Robbie Deas	23	DF	(Scotland) Kilmarnock	Free	5 June 2023	
(Scotland) Lewis Munro	17	GK	(Scotland) Nairn County	Free	6 June 2023	
(Scotland) Jamie Carnihan	17	DF	(Scotland) Nairn County	Free	6 June 2023	
(Scotland) Steven Boyd	26	ST	(Scotland) Greenock Morton	Free	7 June 2023	
(Scotland) Shane Sutherland	32	ST	Released	N/A	9 June 2023	
(Scotland) Scott Allardice	25	MF	(Scotland) Ross County	Free	18 June 2023	
(Scotland) Tom Walsh	26	MF	Released	N/A	1 July 2023	
(Scotland) Aaron Nicolson	18	ST	(Scotland) Nairn County	Free	11 July 2023	
(England) Max Ram	22	DF	(England) Gloucester City	Free	24 August 2023	
(England) Ben Woods	20	MF	(England) Accrington Stanley	Undisclosed	1 September 2023	
(Scotland) Sean Welsh	33	MF	(Scotland) Queen's Park	Free	12 January 2024	
(Republic of Ireland) Zak Delaney	22	DF	(Scotland) Arbroath	Free	12 January 2024	
(Scotland) Harry Hennem	19	MF	(Scotland) Nairn County	Free	12 January 2024	
(Canada) David Wotherspoon	33	ST	(Scotland) Dundee United	Free	15 January 2024	
(Republic of Ireland) Cillian Sheridan	34	ST	(Scotland) Queen's Park	N/A	15 January 2024	
(England) David Carson	28	MF	(Scotland) Livingston	Undisclosed	1 February 2024	

Loans In/Return
Player	Age*	Pos	From	Duration	Date In	Date Out	Notes
(Scotland) Matthew Strachan	18	DF	(Scotland) Nairn County	Return	1 July 2023	N/A	
(Scotland) Max Anderson	22	MF	(Scotland) Dundee	Season	28 August 2023	1 July 2024	
(Wales) Morgan Boyes	22	DF	(Scotland) Livingston	Season	1 September 2023	1 July 2024	
(England) James Carragher	21	DF	(England) Wigan Athletic	Half Season	10 January 2024	1 July 2024	
(Wales) Alex Samuel	28	FW	(Scotland) Ross County	Half Season	19 January 2024	1 July 2024	
(Scotland) Cammy Kerr	28	DF	(Scotland) Dundee	Half Season	25 January 2024	1 July 2024	
(Scotland) Jeremiah Chilokoa-Mullen	19	DF	(England) Leeds United	Half Season	25 January 2024	26 February 2024	Injury Recall
(Northern Ireland) Sean McAllister	21	MF	(England) Everton	Half Season	1 February 2024	1 July 2024	
(Canada) Aribim Pepple	21	FW	(England) Luton Town	Half Season	1 February 2024	1 July 2024	
(Nigeria) Samson Lawal	19	MF	(Scotland) Livingston	Half Season	1 March 2024	1 July 2024	

Loans Out/Return
Player	Age*	Pos	To	Duration	Date Out	Date In	Notes
(Scotland) Daniel MacKay	22	FW	(Scotland) Hibernian	Return	1 July 2023	N/A	
(Scotland) Jay Henderson	21	MF	(Scotland) St Mirren	Return	1 July 2023	N/A	
(Scotland) Harry Hennem	19	MF	(Scotland) Clachnacuddin	Half Season	28 July 2023	1 January 2024	
(Scotland) Ethan Cairns	18	MF	(Scotland) Forres Mechanics	Half Season	29 July 2023	1 January 2024	
(Scotland) Matthew Strachan	18	DF	(Scotland) Brora Rangers	Season	1 August 2023	30 June 2024	Loans Extended
(Scotland) Jack Walker	17	DF	(Scotland) Forres Mechanics	Season	20 October 2023	30 June 2024	Loans Extended
(Scotland) Sam Nixon	17	DF	(Scotland) Forres Mechanics	Season	20 October 2023	30 June 2024	Loans Extended
(Scotland) Calum MacKay	18	MF	(Scotland) Nairn County	Season	20 October 2023	30 June 2024	Loans Extended
(Scotland) Ethan Cairns	18	FW	(Scotland) Banks O' Dee	Half Season	10 January 2024	30 June 2024	
(Scotland) Lewis Hyde	21	MF	(Scotland) Brora Rangers	Half Season	12 January 2024	30 June 2024	
(Scotland) Keith Bray	17	MF	(Scotland) Elgin City	Half Season	23 January 2024	30 June 2024	
(Scotland) Robbie Thompson	19	MF	(Scotland) The Spartans	Half Season	1 February 2024	30 June 2024	
(Scotland) Jake Davidson	23	MF	(Scotland) Hamilton Academical	Half Season	1 February 2024	30 June 2024	
(Scotland) Calum MacLeod	17	MF	(Scotland) Clachnacuddin	Half Season	15 February 2024	30 June 2024	
(Scotland) Jeremiah Chilokoa-Mullen	19	DF	(England) Leeds United	Return	26 February 2024	N/A	Injury Recall

*Age at time of transfer
