= Jake Davison =

Jake Davison may refer to:

- The drummer for the band Aiden (band)
- The perpetrator of the 2021 Plymouth shooting

== See also ==
- Jake Davidson, Scottish footballer
