= Sean McAllister =

Sean McAllister may refer to:

- Sean McAllister (filmmaker) (born 1965), British documentary filmmaker
- Sean McAllister (footballer, born 1987), English football midfielder
- Sean McAllister (footballer, born 2002), Northern Irish football midfielder
