= Charlie Gilmour (footballer, born 1999) =

English association football player

Personal information
- Full name: Charlie Ian Gilmour
- Date of birth: 11 February 1999 (age 27)
- Place of birth: Brighton, England
- Position: Defensive midfielder

Team information
- Current team: Dunfermline Athletic
- Number: 8

Youth career
- 2006–2019: Arsenal

Senior career*
| Years | Team | Apps | (Gls) |
| 2018–2019 | Arsenal | 0 | (0) |
| 2019–2020 | Norwich City | 0 | (0) |
| 2019–2020 | → Telstar (loan) | 24 | (0) |
| 2021–2023 | St Johnstone | 8 | (0) |
| 2021–2022 | → Alloa Athletic (loan) | 11 | (1) |
| 2022–2023 | → Cove Rangers (loan) | 15 | (0) |
| 2023–2025 | Inverness Caledonian Thistle | 59 | (4) |
| 2025– | Dunfermline Athletic | 31 | (2) |

International career^{‡}
| 2013–2014 | Scotland U15 | 3 | (0) |
| 2013 | Scotland U16 | 3 | (0) |
| 2014 | England U16 | 2 | (0) |
| 2015 | England U17 | 3 | (0) |
| 2016 | Scotland U17 | 3 | (0) |
| 2017–2019 | Scotland U19 | 9 | (0) |
- * Club domestic league appearances and goals as of 4 May 2026 ‡ National team caps and goals as of 08:45, 30 November 2018 (UTC)

Charlie Ian Gilmour (born 11 February 1999) is a Scottish professional footballer who plays as a defensive midfielder for Scottish Championship club Dunfermline Athletic.

== Club career ==
=== Arsenal ===
Born in Brighton, Gilmour was spotted by Arsenal scouts at the age of 6. On 29 November 2018, he made his first team debut, playing the last 14 minutes in a 3–0 win over Vorskla Poltava in the Europa League. Gilmour was released by Arsenal on 7 June 2019, after spending 14 years at the club.

=== Norwich City ===
A day later, on 8 July 2019, Gilmour signed with Norwich City on a two-year deal. On 18 July 2019, he signed for Dutch side Telstar on a season-long loan.

=== St Johnstone ===
On 1 February 2021, Gilmour signed a short-term deal with Scottish Premiership side St Johnstone until the end of the season. On 21 May 2021, he signed a new two-year contract with St Johnstone.

=== Inverness Caledonian Thistle ===
On 1 July 2023, Gilmour joined Scottish Championship side Inverness Caledonian Thistle, making his debut on 15 July in a 2–1 home win over Bonnyrigg Rose in the League Cup, before scoring his first goal for the club ten days later in a 3–2 loss to Airdrieonians, also in the League Cup. Gilmour made his league debut for Inverness in a 2–1 home loss to Queen's Park, before scoring his first league goal a season later in a 1–0 home win over Alloa Athletic in League One.

=== Dunfermline Athletic ===
On 2 June 2025, Gilmour joined Scottish Championship club Dunfermline Athletic on a three-year deal.

== International career ==
Gilmour has represented both England and Scotland at youth international level. In 2013 and 2014, he represented Scotland at under-15 and under-16 level but then in 2015, he represented England Under-17 in the FA International Tournament. He later returned to action for Scotland, playing at under-17 and under-19 level.

== Career statistics ==
As of 26 January 2026

Appearances and goals by club, season and competition
| Club | Season | League | | | Cup | | League Cup | | Other | | Total | |
| Club | Season | Division | Apps | Goals | Apps | Goals | Apps | Goals | Apps | Goals | Apps | Goals |
|---|---|---|---|---|---|---|---|---|---|---|---|---|
| Arsenal | 2018–19 | Premier League | 0 | 0 | 0 | 0 | 0 | 0 | 2 (Note: Appearances in the UEFA Europa League) | 0 | 2 | 0 |
| Norwich City | 2019–20 | Premier League | 0 | 0 | 0 | 0 | 0 | 0 | — | | 0 | 0 |
| Telstar (loan) | 2019–20 | Eerste Divisie | 24 | 0 | 1 | 0 | — | | — | | 25 | 0 |
| St Johnstone | 2020–21 | Scottish Premiership | 2 | 0 | 1 | 0 | 0 | 0 | — | | 3 | 0 |
| St Johnstone | 2021–22 | Scottish Premiership | 6 | 0 | 1 | 0 | 1 | 0 | 1 (Note: Appearance in UEFA Europa Conference League) | 0 | 9 | 0 |
| St Johnstone | 2022–23 | Scottish Premiership | 0 | 0 | 0 | 0 | 2 | 0 | 0 | 0 | 2 | 0 |
| St Johnstone | St Johnstone Total | | 8 | 0 | 2 | 0 | 3 | 0 | 1 | 0 | 14 | 0 |
| Alloa Athletic (loan) | 2021–22 | Scottish League One | 11 | 1 | 0 | 0 | — | | 0 | 0 | 11 | 1 |
| Cove Rangers (loan) | 2022–23 | Scottish Championship | 15 | 0 | 1 | 0 | — | | 0 | 0 | 16 | 0 |
| Inverness Caledonian Thistle | 2023–24 | Scottish Championship | 27 | 0 | 3 | 1 | 3 | 1 | 1 (Note: Appearance in the Scottish Challenge Cup.) | 0 | 34 | 2 |
| Inverness Caledonian Thistle | 2024–25 | Scottish League One | 32 | 4 | 1 | 0 | 4 | 0 | 1 | 1 | 38 | 5 |
| Inverness Caledonian Thistle | Inverness Total | | 59 | 4 | 4 | 1 | 7 | 1 | 2 | 1 | 72 | 7 |
| Dunfermline Athletic | 2025-26 | Scottish Championship | 19 | 2 | 2 | 0 | 4 | 0 | 1 | 0 | 26 | 2 |
| Dunfermline Athletic | Dunfermline Total | | 19 | 2 | 2 | 0 | 4 | 0 | 1 | 0 | 26 | 2 |
| Career total | | | 136 | 7 | 10 | 1 | 14 | 1 | 6 | 1 | 166 | 10 |

== Honours ==
St Johnstone

- Scottish Cup: 2020–21
- Scottish League Cup: 2020–21
