= 2018–19 FA Youth Cup =

Football Association Youth Cup

Tournament details
- Country: England; Wales
- Teams: 521

Final positions
- Champions: Liverpool (4th Title)
- Runners-up: Manchester City (8th Runner Up Finish)

Tournament statistics
- Top goal scorer: (Germany) Paul Glatzel Liverpool (8 Goals)

The 2018–19 FA Youth Cup was the 67th edition of the FA Youth Cup. The defending champions were Chelsea who were going for their sixth win in a row. Liverpool won the final 5-3 after a penalty shoot-out against Manchester City, it was their fourth win in the competition.

== First round ==
Tie	Home team	Score	Away team	Att.
1	North Shields (9)	0-7	Bury (4)	256
2	Doncaster Rovers (3)	0-3	Rochdale (3)	
3	Fleetwood Town (3)	2-1	Carlisle United (4)	197
4	Morecambe (4)	0-2	Crewe Alexandra (4)	170
5	Blackpool (3)	4-0	Guiseley (6)	156
6	Tranmere Rovers (4)	0-3	Accrington Stanley (3)	211
7	FC Halifax Town (5)	0-1	Sunderland (3)	159
8	Salford City (5)	3–1	Bradford City (3)	210
9	Chester (6)	2-1	Barnsley (3)	648
10	Altrincham (6)	1-6	Oldham Athletic (4)	259
11	South Shields (7)	6-2	Macclesfield Town (4)	359
12	Scunthorpe United (3)	6-1	AFC Telford United (6)	152
13	Rugby Borough (11)	2-6	Sutton Coldfield Town (8)	172
14	Shrewsbury Town (3)	0-1	Lincoln City (4)	258
15	Cogenhoe United (9)	2-1	Grantham Town (7)	118
16	Grimsby Town (4)	2-3	Mansfield Town (4)	146
17	Long Eaton United (9)	1-2	Milton Keynes Dons (4)	
18	Port Vale (4)	6-1	Kidderminster Harriers (6)	
19	Walsall (3)	1-2	Notts County (4)	286
20	Burton Albion (3)	1-2	Coventry City (3)	
21	Stevenage (4)	3-2	Colchester United (4)	330

Tie	Home team	Score	Away team	Att.
22	Peterborough Sports (8)	0-1	Barnet (5)	122
23	Cambridge United (4)	2-1	AFC Sudbury (8)	215
24	Leyton Orient (5)	3-4	Southend United (3)	336
25	Luton Town (3)	4-1	Brentwood Town (8)	255
26	Hullbridge Sports (9)	0-2	Peterborough United (3)	278
27	Northampton Town (4)	4–0	King's Lynn Town (7)	521
28	Worthing (7)	1-2	Cray Wanderers (8)	170
29	Wingate & Finchley (7)	5-3	Kings Langley (7)	102
30	Phoenix Sports (8)	1-4	Andover Town (10)	75
31	Lewes (7)	2-3	Sutton United (5)	105
32	Charlton Athletic (3)	6-0	Whitehawk (7)	243
33	Hemel Hempstead Town (6)	0-3	Oxford United (3)	120
34	AFC Wimbledon (3)	1-3	Gillingham (3)	339
35	Maidenhead United (5)	5-0	Dulwich Hamlet (6)	164
36	Exeter City (4)	3-2	Plymouth Argyle (3)	446
37	Newport County (4)	1-2	Yeovil Town (4)	200
38	Portsmouth (3)	5-2	Bristol Rovers (3)	591
39	Forest Green Rovers (4)	1-3	Cheltenham Town (4)	
40	Aldershot Town (5)	1-4	Clevedon Town (9)	112
41	Torquay United (6)	4-1	Totton & Eling (10)	
42	Swindon Town (4)	7-0	Moneyfields (8)	151

== Second round ==
Tie	Home team	Score	Away team	Att.
1	Lincoln City (4)	6-2	South Shields (7)	442
2	Bury (4)	3-2	Fleetwood Town (3)	277
3	Scunthorpe United (3)	1-2	Blackpool (3)	202
4	Mansfield Town (4)	2-0	Chester (6)	325
5	Sunderland (3)	4-1	Oldham Athletic (4)	210
6	Accrington Stanley (3)	2–0	Notts County (4)	
7	Rochdale (3)	2-0	Milton Keynes Dons (4)	301
8	Port Vale (4)	3–1	Sutton Coldfield Town (8)	231
9	Salford City (5)	1-2	Crewe Alexandra (4)	259
10	Cogenhoe United (9)	3-2	Coventry City (3)	238

Tie	Home team	Score	Away team	Att.
11	Yeovil Town (4)	1-4	Cambridge United (4)	231
12	Charlton Athletic (3)	2-0	Southend United (3)	166
13	Clevedon Town (9)	1-2	Sutton United* (5)	226
14	Peterborough United (3)	3-0	Luton Town (3)	429
15	Oxford United (3)	1-0	Barnet (5)	266
16	Stevenage (4)	4-0	Exeter City (4)	240
17	Northampton Town (3)	2-0	Swindon Town (4)	577
18	Maidenhead United (5)	3-1	Torquay United (6)	239
19	Cray Wanderers (8)	0-4	Portsmouth (3)	270
20	Cheltenham Town (4)	0-4	Gillingham (3)	212
21	Wingate & Finchley (7)	2-2 (7-8 p)	Andover Town (10)	135

|note = Sutton United was kicked out for using ineligible Player so Clevedon Town moved on instead

== Third round ==
Tie	Home team	Score	Away team	Att.
1	Sheffield Wednesday (2)	2–3	Stoke City (2)	484
2	Blackburn Rovers (2)	1–2	Gillingham (3)	224
3	Everton	4-1	Sunderland (3)	132
4	Burnley	1-1 (2-3 p)	Oxford United (3)	363
5	Huddersfield Town	0-2	Peterborough United (3)	301
6	Watford	1–0	Birmingham City (2)	207
7	Preston North End (2)	2-2 (3-1 p)	Charlton Athletic (3)	530
8	Leicester City	2–1 (AET)	Fulham	316
9	Arsenal	2-0	Northampton Town (4)	527
10	Accrington Stanley (3)	4-2	Leeds United (2)	
11	Wolverhampton Wanderers	1-2	Wigan Athletic (2)	379
12	Hull City (2)	2-1	Cardiff City	250
13	Maidenhead United (5)	1-5	Nottingham Forest (2)	454
14	Middlesbrough (2)	0–1	Sheffield United (2)	163
15	Bristol City (2)	1-2	Crewe Alexandra (4)	
16	West Bromwich Albion (2)	5-1	Lincoln City (4)	302

Tie	Home team	Score	Away team	Att.
17	Liverpool	3-2	Portsmouth (3)	254
18	Manchester United	4-3	Chelsea	923
19	West Ham United	1-1 (4-5 p)	Brighton and Hove Albion	238
20	Southampton	2-0	Rotherham United (2)	250
21	Aston Villa (2)	4-2	Swansea City (2)	407
22	Blackpool (3)	1–2	Derby County (2)	167
23	Ipswich Town (2)	4-0	Andover Town (10)	
24	Bolton Wanderers (2)	2-1	Newcastle United	416
25	AFC Bournemouth	2-1	Mansfield Town (4)	241
26	Stevenage (4)	2-4	Bury (4)	188
27	Cogenhoe United (9)	1-2	Crystal Palace	439
28	Millwall (2)	2-3(AET)	Tottenham Hotspurs	752
29	Port Vale (4)	2-3	Norwich City (2)	208
30	Clevedon Town (9)	0–4	Manchester City	1,591
31	Queens Park Rangers (2)	3-2	Rochdale (3)	324
32	Cambridge United (4)	1-3	Reading (2)	233

== Fourth round ==
Tie	Home team	Score	Away team	Att.
1	Stoke City (2)	2–2 (1-3 p)	Everton	440
2	Gillingham (3)	1–2	Ipswich Town (2)	369
3	Derby County (2)	3-0	Sheffield United (2)	
4	Hull City	2-6 (2)	Wigan Athletic (2)	397
5	Oxford United (3)	0-3	AFC Bournemouth	348
6	Leicester City	4–0	Crewe Alexandra (4)	
7	Arsenal	5-2	Tottenham Hotspurs	946
8	Crystal Palace	2–4	Bolton Wanderers (2)	

Tie	Home team	Score	Away team	Att.
9	West Bromwich Albion (2)	5-1	Queens Park Rangers (2)	307
10	Manchester United	1-3	Brighton and Hove Albion	
11	Preston North End (2)	3-0	Norwich City (2)	620
12	Liverpool	4-0	Accrington Stanley (3)	706
13	Aston Villa (2)	4-1	Reading (2)	
14	Peterborough United (3)	0–1	Bury (4)	614
15	Watford	2-1	Southampton	207
16	Manchester City	4-1	Nottingham Forest (2)	663

== Fifth round ==
Tie	Home team	Score	Away team	Att.
1	Preston North End (2)	0—2	Bury (4)	1,027
2	AFC Bournemouth	2—0	Aston Villa (2)	356
3	Arsenal	1—2	West Bromwich Albion (2)	391
4	Everton	2—0	Brighton and Hove Albion	178
5	Bolton Wanderers (2)	0—3	Leicester City	267
6	Liverpool	2—0	Wigan Athletic (2)	576
7	Derby County (2)	1—2	Manchester City	
8	Watford	4—1	Ipswich Town (2)	260

== Quarter finals ==
Tie no	Home team	Score	Away team	Attendance
1	AFC Bournemouth	1–4	Manchester City	1,136
2	West Bromwich Albion (2)	4-3	Everton	613
3	Leicester City	1–2 aet	Watford	716
4	Bury (4)	1–5	Liverpool	765

== Semi finals ==
17 March 2019
19:00

Liverpool	2–1	Watford
Glatzel 9', 24'		Cassidy 79'

Anfield
Attendance: 1,279
Referee: Ben Toner
1 April 2019
19:00

Manchester City	4–2	West Bromwich Albion (2)
Knight 8'; Doyle 53'; Solanke 78' (o.g.); Nmecha 87'	Report	Soule 34'; Tulloch 85'

Academy Stadium
Attendance: 1,703
Referee: Thomas Bramall

== Final ==
25 April 2019
19:45

Manchester City	1–1 (a.e.t.)	Liverpool
Touaizi 45+2'	Report	Duncan 86'
Penalties
F. Nmecha (penalty scored); Palmer (penalty missed); Doyle (penalty scored); Dele-Bashiru (penalty scored)	3–5	N. Williams (penalty scored); Dixon-Bonner (penalty scored); Sharif (penalty scored); Bearne (penalty scored); Glatzel (penalty scored)

Academy Stadium
Attendance: 3,878

Note: Flags indicate national team as defined under FIFA eligibility rules; some limited exceptions apply. Players may hold more than one non-FIFA nationality.

Manchester City
No.	Pos.	Nation	Player
1	GK	ENG	Louie Moulden
2	DF	ESP	Alpha Diounkou
3	DF	ESP	Eric García (C) (substituted off) 59'
4	DF	ENG	Taylor Harwood-Bellis (substituted off) 116'
5	DF	NED	Jeremie Frimpong
6	DF	ENG	Rowan McDonald
7	MF	ENG	Ben Knight (substituted off) 90+4'
8	MF	ENG	Tommy Doyle
9	FW	ESP	Nabil Touaizi
10	MF	ENG	Felix Nmecha
11	MF	ESP	Adrián Bernabé (substituted off) 107'
Substitutes:
—	GK	IRL	Gavin Bazunu
—	MF	ENG	Cole Palmer (substituted on) 107'
12	DF	ENG	Nathanael Ogbeta (substituted on) 90+4'
14	MF	ENG	Fisayo Dele-Bashiru (substituted on) 59'
15	FW	ENG	Henri Ogunby (substituted on) 116'
Coach		ENG	Gareth Taylor

Liverpool
No.	Pos.	Nation	Player
1	GK	CZE	Vítězslav Jaroš
2	DF	WAL	Neco Williams
3	DF	ALG	Yasser Larouci
4	DF	ENG	Rhys Williams
5	MF	ENG	Morgan Boyes
6	MF	ENG	Leighton Clarkson (substituted off) 78'
7	MF	ENG	Abdi Sharif
8	MF	ENG	Jake Cain (substituted off) 101'
9	FW	GER	Paul Glatzel (c)
10	FW	ENG	Bobby Duncan
11	MF	ENG	Elijah Dixon-Bonner
Substitutes:
—	GK	ENG	Oscar Kelly
—	FW	ENG	Fidel O'Rourke
—	FW	ENG	Remi Savage
15	MF	ENG	Luis Longstaff (substituted on) 78'
16	MF	ENG	Jack Bearne (substituted on) 101'
Coach			Barry Lewtas

== See also ==
- 2018–19 FA Cup
