= James Nolan (footballer) =

English footballer (born 2005)

Personal information
- Full name: James Stephen Nolan
- Date of birth: 2 October 2005 (age 21)
- Place of birth: Chorley, England
- Position: Defender

Youth career
- –2023: Manchester United

Senior career*
Years	Team	Apps	(Gls)
2023–2025	Manchester United	0	(0)
2024–2025	→ Inverness Caledonian Thistle (loan)	30	(1)
2025	Marine	3	(0)
2025-2026	Charnock Richard	19	(3)
2026-	Lancaster City F.C.	16	(0)
- * Club domestic league appearances and goals as of 9:06, 9 September 2025 (UTC)

James Nolan (born 2 October 2005) is an English footballer who plays as a defender, for Lancaster.

He is the younger brother of Chorley midfielder Joe Nolan.

== Career ==
Nolan started his career progressing through the youth ranks of Manchester United, winning the U-18 Premier League along the way, before signing his first professional contract in 2023, playing with the reserves in the Premier League 2, before making his professional debut on 22 August 2023, playing the full match in a 1–1 away draw to Stockport County in the EFL Cup, in which he scored in the subsequent penalty shootout as United won 5–3.

On deadline day 2024, Nolan joined Scottish League One side, Inverness Caledonian Thistle on loan, before making his first team debut as a substitute in a 1–0 home win over Queen of the South on the same day. On 21 September, Nolan scored his first professional goal in a 1–1 home draw with Cove Rangers.

In August 2025, Nolan joined Marine. He departed the club in September 2025.. He signed for Charnock Richard at the end of December 2025, making 19 appearances and scoring 3 goals. In June 2026, Lancaster City F.C. announced the signing of the young defender, joining their campaign for the upcoming 2026-2027 Northern Premier League Premier Division.

== Career statistics ==
As of match played 6 September 2025

Club	Season	League			National cup (Note: Includes Scottish Cup, FA Cup)		League cup (Note: Includes Scottish League Cup)		Other		Total	
Club	Season	Division	Apps	Goals	Apps	Goals	Apps	Goals	Apps	Goals	Apps	Goals
Manchester United U21	2023–24	—			—		—		3 (Note: Appearance(s) in EFL Trophy)	0	3	0
Manchester United U21	2024–25	—			—		—		1	0	1	0
Manchester United U21	Total		—		—		—		4	0	4	0
Inverness Caledonian Thistle (loan)	2024–25	Scottish League One	30	1	1	0	0	0	2 (Note: Appearance(s) in Scottish Challenge Cup)	0	33	1
Marine	2025–26	National League North	3	0	0	0	—		0	0	3	0
Career total			33	1	1	0	0	0	6	0	40	1

== Honours ==
Manchester United

- Under-18 Premier League: 2023–24
