= Remi Savage =

English footballer (born 2001)

Personal information
- Full name: Remi Savage
- Date of birth: 26 October 2001 (age 25)
- Place of birth: Liverpool, England
- Position: Centre-back

Team information
- Current team: Inverness Caledonian Thistle
- Number: 5

Youth career
- –2019: Liverpool

Senior career*
Years	Team	Apps	(Gls)
2019–2021	Liverpool	0	(0)
2021–2024	Newcastle United	0	(0)
2024–	Inverness Caledonian Thistle	84	(2)
- * Club domestic league appearances and goals as of 09:49, 3 May 2026 (UTC)

Remi Savage (born 26 October 2001) is an English professional footballer who plays as a centre-back for Scottish Championship club Inverness Caledonian Thistle.

== Career ==
Born in Liverpool, Savage played for Liverpool at youth level; he was part of the team that won the FA Youth Cup in 2019 and made his debut for the U21s in a 5–2 away loss to Accrington Stanley in the EFL Trophy later that year, but failed to break into the senior squad before signing for Newcastle United in July 2021. Savage made his debut for The Toon in a 3–0 away loss to Sheffield Wednesday in the EFL Cup, but did not make any appearances in the Premier League.

On 25 January 2024, Savage moved to Inverness Caledonian Thistle on a permanent deal, making his debut two days later in a 3–2 away win over league leaders Raith Rovers before netting his first senior goal in a 3–3 home draw with Partick Thistle.

== Career statistics ==
As of match played 11 October 2025

Appearances and goals by club, season and competition
Club	Season	League			Scottish Cup		Scottish League Cup		Other		Total	
Club	Season	Division	Apps	Goals	Apps	Goals	Apps	Goals	Apps	Goals	Apps	Goals
Liverpool U21	2019–20	—			—		—		1 (Note: Appearance(s) in EFL Trophy)	0	1	0
Liverpool U21	2020–21	—			—		—		2	0	2	0
Liverpool U21	Total		—		—		—		3	0	3	0
Newcastle United U21	2021–22	—			—		—		2	0	2	0
Newcastle United U21	2022–23	—			—		—		1	0	1	0
Newcastle United U21	2023–24	—			—		—		3	0	3	0
Newcastle United U21	Total		—		—		—		6	0	6	0
Inverness Caledonian Thistle	2023–24	Scottish Championship	13	1	1	0	—		3 (Note: Appearance(s) in Scottish Championship play-offs)	0	17	1
Inverness Caledonian Thistle	2024–25	Scottish League One	35	1	1	0	4	0	2 (Note: Appearance(s) in Scottish Challenge Cup)	0	42	1
Inverness Caledonian Thistle	2025–26	Scottish League One	9	0	0	0	4	0	4	0	17	0
Inverness Caledonian Thistle	Total		57	2	2	0	8	0	9	0	76	2
Career total			57	2	2	0	8	0	18	0	85	2

== Honours ==
Liverpool

- FA Youth Cup: 2018–19

Inverness Caledonian Thistle

- Scottish League One: 2025–26
