= Musa Dibaga =

Gambian footballer (born 2000)

Personal information
- Full name: Musa Dibaga Nimaga
- Date of birth: 27 April 2000 (age 26)
- Place of birth: Zaragoza, Spain
- Height: 1.94 m (6 ft 4 in)
- Position: Goalkeeper

Team information
- Current team: Dunfermline Athletic
- Number: 12

Youth career
- –2020: Robres

Senior career*
Years	Team	Apps	(Gls)
2020–2021	Robres	20	(0)
2021–2022	Whitehill Welfare		
2022–2024	Bo'ness United	63	(0)
2024–2025	Inverness Caledonian Thistle	30	(0)
2025–2026	Crusaders	16	(0)
2026–	Dunfermline Athletic	1	(0)
- * Club domestic league appearances and goals as of 09:59, 9 August 2026 (UTC)

Musa Dibaga Nimaga (born 27 April 2000) is a Gambian footballer who plays as a goalkeeper for Scottish Championship side Dunfermline Athletic.

== Career ==
Dibaga started his career playing at Murieston Amateurs (second choice) before moving on to Robres of the Spanish Tercera Federación, being promoted to the first team and making 20 appearances over the 2020–21 season. In July 2021, Dibaga moved to Scotland and joined East of Scotland Premier Division side, Whitehill Welfare for a season before leaving them following their relegation to the First Division. In July 2022, Dibaga joined Lowland League side, Bo'ness United on a two-year deal. In his first season, Dibaga picked up a Lowland League Cup runners up medal, as Bo'ness held East Kilbride to a 2–2 draw before losing on penalties.

In August 2024, Dibaga got his first move into professional football, joining recently relegated Inverness Caledonian Thistle in Scottish League One, before making his professional debut a fortnight later in a 1–1 home draw against Montrose. After being a big part in keeping the Caley Jags in League One amidst the club suffering through administration, Dibaga departed Inverness in 2025 "with a heavy heart" after not being able to agree on terms for a new contract due to the club's situation.

== International career ==
On 11 March 2025, Dibaga was named in the provisional 33 man squad for The Gambia's 2026 World Cup Qualifying campaign ahead of their matches against Kenya and Ivory Coast, before being named in the final 24 man squad.

== Honours ==
Bo'ness United

Lowland League Cup runner up: 2022–23
