= Keith Bray =

Scottish footballer (born 2006)

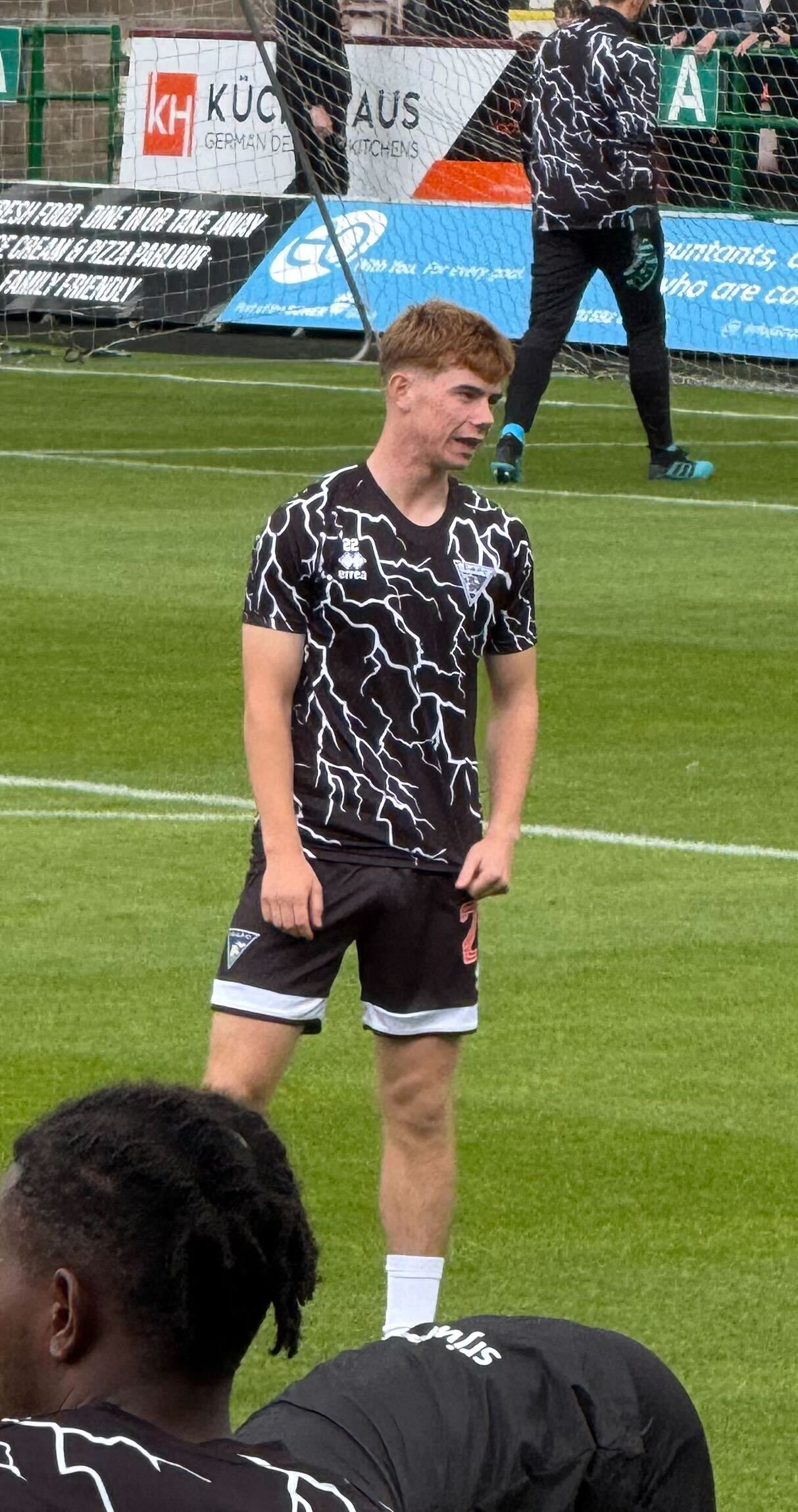
- Keith Bray warming up for Dunfermline Athletic in August 2025.

Personal information
- Date of birth: 1 April 2006 (age 20)
- Place of birth: Aird Tong, Scotland
- Positions: Central midfielder; full-back

Team information
- Current team: Dunfermline Athletic
- Number: 22

Youth career
- –2022: Stornoway Athletic
- 2022: Inverness Caledonian Thistle (dual–registration)

Senior career*
Years	Team	Apps	(Gls)
2022–2025	Inverness Caledonian Thistle	24	(4)
2024	→ Elgin City (loan)	16	(0)
2025–	Dunfermline Athletic	27	(1)
2025	→ Inverness Caledonian Thistle (loan)	14	(6)
- * Club domestic league appearances and goals as of 00:49, 28 October 2026 (UTC)

Keith Bray (born 1 April 2006) is a Scottish professional footballer who plays as a central midfielder for Dunfermline Athletic in Scottish Championship.

== Career ==
Bray started his career under a dual registration with Scottish Championship side, Inverness Caledonian Thistle, and Lewis and Harris League side, Stornoway Athletic, before signing professionally for Inverness in July 2022. On 10 December 2022, Bray made his debut for Inverness in a 2–0 away defeat to Hamilton Academical in the Scottish Challenge Cup, playing all 90 minutes in an injury ravaged side. On 20 July 2024, Bray scored his first Inverness goal in a 3–0 win over Bonnyrigg Rose in the League Cup. Bray went on to make his first league appearance on 5 August 2023, in a 2–1 home loss to Queen's Park, in which he was booked.

In January 2024, Bray was sent on loan to League Two side, Elgin City, for the remainder of the season.

In July 2024, Bray became a first team regular at Inverness, starting in all 4 League Cup games and scoring against Bonnyrigg Rose in a 3–0 home win, before playing 84 minutes of the season opener against Dumbarton. On 9 November 2024, Bray scored his first league goal for Inverness, in a 2–1 away win over Cove Rangers.

On the last day of the winter 2025 transfer window, Bray signed for Championship side Dunfermline Athletic on a four and a half year deal and was immediately loaned back to Inverness until the end of the season.

== Career statistics ==
As of match played 27 October 2026

Appearances and goals by club, season and competition
Club	Season	League			Scottish Cup		League Cup		Other		Total	
Club	Season	Division	Apps	Goals	Apps	Goals	Apps	Goals	Apps	Goals	Apps	Goals
Inverness Caledonian Thistle	2022–23	Scottish Championship	0	0	0	0	0	0	1 (Note: Appearances in the Scottish Challenge Cup)	0	1	0
Inverness Caledonian Thistle	2023–24	Scottish Championship	5	0	0	0	3	0	1	0	9	0
Inverness Caledonian Thistle	2024–25 (Note: Bray signed for Dunfermline Athletic in February 2025 but remained at Inverness on loan until the end of the season.)	Scottish League One	32	6	0	0	4	1	1	0	37	7
Inverness Caledonian Thistle	Total		37	6	0	0	7	1	3	0	47	7
Elgin City (loan)	2023–24	Scottish League Two	16	0	0	0	0	0	0	0	16	0
Dunfermline Athletic	2025-26	Scottish Championship	18	1	1	0	2	0	1	0	22	1
Dunfermline Athletic	2026-27	Scottish Championship	9	0	0	0	3	0	0	0	12	0
Dunfermline Athletic	Total		27	1	1	0	5	0	1	0	34	1
Career total			80	7	1	0	12	1	4	0	97	8
