= Lewis Hyde (footballer) =

Scottish footballer (born 2002)

Personal information
- Full name: Lewis Hyde
- Date of birth: 15 July 2002 (age 24)
- Place of birth: Inverness, Scotland
- Position: Midfielder

Team information
- Current team: Elgin City
- Number: 17

Youth career
- –2020: Inverness Caledonian Thistle

Senior career*
Years	Team	Apps	(Gls)
2019–2024	Inverness Caledonian Thistle	30	(0)
2020	→ Fort William (loan)		
2020–2021	→ Rothes (loan)	2	(0)
2021–2022	→ Rothes (loan)	10	(1)
2024	→ Brora Rangers (loan)	0	(0)
2024–	Elgin City	46	(1)
- * Club domestic league appearances and goals as of 4 May 2026

Lewis Hyde (born 15 July 2002) is a Scottish footballer who plays as a midfielder for Scottish League Two club Elgin City.

== Career ==
Born in Inverness, Hyde started his career at Inverness Caledonian Thistle and made his debut for the club on 7 September 2019 in a 3–1 victory over Greenock Morton in the Scottish Challenge Cup.

He joined Fort William on loan in January 2020.

In December 2020, he joined Highland Football League side Rothes on loan until January 2021.

In summer 2021, Hyde signed a new contract with Inverness. In September 2021, he returned to Rothes on loan, and scored a last minute winner in his first appearance back at the club to beat Blackburn United 2–1 in the Scottish Cup. He was recalled from his loan in February 2022.

In May 2022, Hyde signed a new contract with Inverness, keeping him at the club for the following season.

In May 2023, Hyde appeared in SFA cup semi final against Falkirk.

In January 2024, Hyde was sent on loan to Brora Rangers.

On 28 June 2024, Hyde signed a two-year contract with Elgin City F.C.

== Career statistics ==
As of match played 3 May 2025

Appearances and goals by club, season and competition
Club	Season	League			Scottish Cup		Scottish League Cup		Other		Total	
Club	Season	Division	Apps	Goals	Apps	Goals	Apps	Goals	Apps	Goals	Apps	Goals
Inverness Caledonian Thistle	2019–20	Scottish Championship	0	0	0	0	0	0	1 (Note: Appearances in the Scottish Challenge Cup)	0	1	0
Inverness Caledonian Thistle	2020–21	Scottish Championship	0	0	0	0	1	0	0	0	1	0
Inverness Caledonian Thistle	2021–22	Scottish Championship	6	0	0	0	1	0	5 (Note: 1 Appearance in the Scottish League Challenge Cup.) (Note: 4 Appearance(s) in the 2021-22 Scottish Premiership Play-offs.)	0	12	0
Inverness Caledonian Thistle	2022–23	Scottish Championship	23	0	4	0	3	0	1	0	31	0
Inverness Caledonian Thistle	2023–24	Scottish Championship	1	0	0	0	1	0	1	1	3	1
Inverness Caledonian Thistle	Total		30	0	4	0	6	0	8	1	48	1
Rothes (loan)	2020–21	Highland Football League	2	0	1	0	0	0	0	0	3	0
Rothes (loan)	2021–22	Highland Football League	10	1	2	1	0	0	1 (Note: Appearance(s) in the Highland League Cup.)	0	13	2
Rothes (loan)	Total		12	1	3	1	0	0	1	0	16	2
Elgin City	2024–25	Scottish League Two	32	1	2	0	2	0	2	0	38	1
Career total			74	2	9	1	8	0	11	1	102	4
