= 2024–25 Scottish League One =

Scottish League One
- Season: 2024–25
- Dates: 3 August 2024 – 3 May 2025
- Champions: Arbroath
- Promoted: Arbroath
- Relegated: Annan Athletic; Dumbarton
- Matches: 180
- Goals: 486 (2.7 per match)
- Top goalscorer: Ross Cunningham; Mitch Megginson (13 goals)
- Biggest home win: Alloa Athletic 5–0 Annan Athletic (2 November 2024)
- Biggest away win: Kelty Hearts 0–6 Dumbarton (5 April 2025)
- Highest scoring: Annan Athletic 3–4 Alloa Athletic (22 February 2025)
- Longest winning run: Queen of the South; Stenhousemuir (5 games)
- Longest unbeaten run: Arbroath (9 games)
- Longest winless run: Dumbarton (11 games)
- Longest losing run: Dumbarton (6 games)
- Highest attendance: 2,714; Arbroath 3–0 Montrose (28 December 2024)
- Lowest attendance: 176; Cove Rangers 0–3 Stenhousemuir (3 December 2024)
- Total attendance: 152,518
- Average attendance: 847
- All statistics correct as of 3 May 2025.

The 2024–25 Scottish League One (known as William Hill League One for sponsorship reasons) was the twelfth season of Scottish League One, the third tier of Scottish football. The season began on 3 August 2024 and concluded on 3 May 2025.

Ten teams contested the league: Alloa Athletic, Annan Athletic, Arbroath, Cove Rangers, Dumbarton, Inverness Caledonian Thistle, Kelty Hearts, Montrose, Queen of the South and Stenhousemuir.

== Teams ==
The following teams changed division after the 2023–24 season.

=== To League One ===
Promoted from League Two

- Stenhousemuir
- Dumbarton

Relegated from the Championship

- Arbroath
- Inverness Caledonian Thistle

=== From League One ===
Relegated to League Two

- Edinburgh City
- Stirling Albion

Promoted to the Championship

- Falkirk
- Hamilton Academical

=== Stadia and locations ===
Alloa Athletic	Annan Athletic	Arbroath	Cove Rangers
Recreation Park	Galabank	Gayfield Park	Balmoral Stadium
Capacity: 3,100	Capacity: 2,504	Capacity: 6,600	Capacity: 2,602
Dumbarton	Location of teams in 2024–25 Scottish League One		Inverness Caledonian Thistle
Dumbarton Football Stadium	Location of teams in 2024–25 Scottish League One		Caledonian Stadium
Capacity: 2,020	Location of teams in 2024–25 Scottish League One		Capacity: 7,512
Kelty Hearts	Montrose	Queen of the South	Stenhousemuir
New Central Park	Links Park	Palmerston Park	Ochilview Park
Capacity: 2,181	Capacity: 4,936	Capacity: 8,690	Capacity: 3,746

=== Personnel and kits ===
Team	Manager	Captain	Kit manufacturer	Shirt sponsor
Alloa Athletic	(Scotland) Andy Graham	(Scotland) Scott Taggart	Pendle	Northern Gas and Power
Annan Athletic	(Scotland) Willie Gibson	(Scotland) Tommy Muir	EV2 Sportswear	M & S Engineering
Arbroath	(Scotland) David Gold (Scotland) Colin Hamilton	(Scotland) Thomas O'Brien	Macron	Megatech
Cove Rangers	(Scotland) Paul Hartley	(Scotland) Mitch Megginson	Adidas	KR Group
Dumbarton	(Scotland) Stephen Farrell	(Scotland) Mark Durnan	Macron	JJR Print (Home); C&G Systems (Away)
Inverness Caledonian Thistle	(Scotland) Scott Kellacher	(Northern Ireland) Danny Devine	Puma	ILI Group
Kelty Hearts	(Scotland) Thomas O'Ware	(Scotland) Thomas O'Ware	Adidas	I-Scaff Access Solutions
Montrose	(Scotland) Stewart Petrie	(Scotland) Paul Watson	Uhlsport	Montrose Port Authority (Home); InterMoor (Away)
Queen of the South	(Republic of Ireland) Peter Murphy	(England) Matty Douglas	Macron	Galloway Controls
Stenhousemuir	(Scotland) Gary Naysmith	(Scotland) Gregor Buchanan	Uhlsport	LOC Hire

=== Managerial changes ===
Team	Outgoing manager	Manner of departure	Date of vacancy	Position in table	Incoming manager	Date of appointment
Queen of the South	(England) Marvin Bartley	Mutual consent	4 May 2024	Pre-season	(Republic of Ireland) Peter Murphy	9 May 2024
Annan Athletic	(Republic of Ireland) Peter Murphy	Signed by Queen of the South	9 May 2024	Pre-season	(Scotland) Willie Gibson	16 May 2024
Arbroath	(Scotland) Jim McIntyre	Sacked	17 August 2024	10th	(Scotland) David Gold and Colin Hamilton	17 August 2024
Inverness Caledonian Thistle	(Scotland) Duncan Ferguson	Sacked after club entered administration	23 October 2024	10th	(Scotland) Scott Kellacher	23 October 2024
Kelty Hearts	(Scotland) Michael Tidser	Signed by Dunfermline Athletic	17 January 2025	3rd	(Scotland) Charlie Mulgrew	17 January 2025
Kelty Hearts	(Scotland) Charlie Mulgrew	Resigned	8 April 2025	7th	(Scotland) Thomas O'Ware	11 April 2025

== League table ==
Pos	Team	Pld	W	D	L	GF	GA	GD	Pts	Promotion, qualification or relegation
1	Arbroath (C, P)	36	19	7	10	58	42	+16	64	Promotion to the Championship
2	Cove Rangers	36	16	9	11	62	44	+18	57	Qualification for the Championship play-offs
3	Queen of the South	36	16	7	13	46	41	+5	55	Qualification for the Championship play-offs
4	Stenhousemuir	36	15	8	13	48	45	+3	53	Qualification for the Championship play-offs
5	Alloa Athletic	36	13	12	11	55	47	+8	51	
6	Kelty Hearts	36	11	11	14	40	46	−6	44	
7	Inverness Caledonian Thistle	36	16	10	10	45	38	+7	43 (Note: Inverness Caledonian Thistle were deducted 15 points for entering administration.)	
8	Montrose	36	9	13	14	40	49	−9	40	
9	Annan Athletic (R)	36	10	6	20	41	68	−27	36	Qualification for the League One play-offs
10	Dumbarton (R)	36	8	11	17	51	66	−15	20 (Note: Dumbarton were deducted 15 points for entering administration.)	Relegation to League Two

Rules for classification: 1) Points; 2) Goal difference; 3) Goals scored; 4) Head-to-to head points; 5) Head-to-head goal difference; 6) Play-off (only for deciding promotion, play-off participation and relegation).
(C) Champions; (P) Promoted; (R) Relegated

== Results ==
Teams played each other four times, twice in the first half of the season (home and away) and twice in the second half of the season (home and away), making a total of 180 games, with each team playing 36.

=== First half of season (Matches 1–18) ===
Home \ Away	ALO	ANN	ARB	COV	DUM	ICT	KEL	MON	QOS	STE
Alloa Athletic	—	5–0	0–1	0–2	2–2	2–2	1–0	1–2	0–0	1–0
Annan Athletic	0–1	—	0–4	1–1	1–1	1–0	0–2	1–0	1–0	1–1
Arbroath	0–0	2–0	—	2–1	1–3	1–0	0–3	0–0	2–1	1–0
Cove Rangers	2–0	1–3	2–4	—	1–1	1–2	0–0	1–0	2–0	0–3
Dumbarton	3–3	1–5	2–2	0–3	—	3–1	2–2	0–1	2–1	1–3
Inverness Caledonian Thistle	1–0	1–0	0–2	1–1	1–1	—	1–1	1–1	1–0	0–0
Kelty Hearts	0–2	3–0	3–2	1–3	2–0	0–0	—	0–2	2–0	2–0
Montrose	2–2	2–1	1–1	0–2	1–2	2–3	1–1	—	1–0	3–0
Queen of the South	1–1	2–0	2–1	2–1	2–0	3–2	1–5	1–0	—	2–1
Stenhousemuir	0–1	5–1	2–1	3–2	4–0	0–1	2–1	1–0	0–0	—

Legend: Blue = home team win; Yellow = draw; Red = away team win.
For upcoming matches, an "a" indicates there is an article about the rivalry between the two participants.

=== Second half of season (Matches 19–36) ===
Home \ Away	ALO	ANN	ARB	COV	DUM	ICT	KEL	MON	QOS	STE
Alloa Athletic	—	1–0	2–3	2–1	2–3	1–2	2–0	2–1	1–1	1–3
Annan Athletic	3–4	—	5–1	2–4	2–1	0–3	2–1	2–2	0–2	0–2
Arbroath	1–3	3–0	—	1–0	1–1	3–0	2–1	3–0	1–1	4–0
Cove Rangers	1–1	3–1	2–1	—	2–1	0–3	2–2	1–1	3–1	0–0
Dumbarton	1–1	3–1	1–2	1–3	—	0–1	2–0	2–3	0–0	1–3
Inverness Caledonian Thistle	1–1	0–1	3–0	1–4	2–0	—	0–2	1–1	1–0	4–1
Kelty Hearts	2–1	1–3	1–1	0–4	0–6	0–1	—	0–0	1–3	0–0
Montrose	2–2	3–1	0–1	2–2	2–2	0–2	0–0	—	0–3	0–3
Queen of the South	3–2	1–1	0–3	1–0	3–1	4–1	0–1	2–1	—	2–0
Stenhousemuir	1–4	1–1	2–0	0–4	2–1	1–1	0–0	2–3	2–1	—

Legend: Blue = home team win; Yellow = draw; Red = away team win.
For upcoming matches, an "a" indicates there is an article about the rivalry between the two participants.

== Season statistics ==
=== Scoring ===
==== Top scorers ====
Rank	Player	Club	Goals
1	(Scotland) Mitch Megginson	Cove Rangers	13
1	(Scotland) Ross Cunningham	Kelty Hearts	13
3	(Scotland) Adam Emslie	Cove Rangers	12
4	(Scotland) Luke Rankin	Alloa Athletic	10
4	(Scotland) Tommy Muir	Annan Athletic	10
4	(Scotland) Keith Bray	Inverness CT	10
4	(Scotland) Adam Brooks	Queen of the South	10

== Awards ==
Month	Manager of the Month		Player of the Month	
Month	Manager	Club	Player	Club
August	(Scotland) Michael Tidser	Kelty Hearts	(Scotland) Ross Cunningham	Kelty Hearts
September	(Scotland) Stewart Petrie	Montrose	(Scotland) Reece Lyon	Queen of the South
October	(Scotland) Paul Hartley	Cove Rangers	(Scotland) Mitch Megginson	Cove Rangers
November	(Scotland) Scott Kellacher	Inverness CT	(Scotland) Scott Williamson	Kelty Hearts
December	(Scotland) David Gold (Scotland) Colin Hamilton	Arbroath	(Scotland) Gavin Reilly	Arbroath
January	(Republic of Ireland) Peter Murphy	Queen of the South	(Scotland) Adam Brooks	Queen of the South
February	(Scotland) Gary Naysmith	Stenhousemuir	(Scotland) Owen Stirton	Montrose
March	(Scotland) David Gold (Scotland) Colin Hamilton	Arbroath	(Scotland) Blair Lyons	Montrose
April	(Republic of Ireland) Peter Murphy	Queen of the South	(Scotland) Jordan Allan	Queen of the South

== League One play-offs ==
=== Bracket ===
Semi-finals
1	Annan Athletic	4	1	5
4	Elgin City	2	2	4
3	East Fife	0	3	3
2	Edinburgh City	1	0	1

Final
Annan Athletic	2	1	3
East Fife	3	1	4

=== Semi-finals ===
==== First leg ====
6 May 2025	Elgin City	2–4	Annan Athletic	Elgin
19:45	Sargent 22'; Murray 45'		Goss 17'; Kilsby 23'; Muir 26', 36'	Stadium: Borough Briggs; Attendance: 1,104; Referee: Duncan Nicolson

6 May 2025	Edinburgh City	1–0	East Fife	Edinburgh
19:45	Zaid 76'			Stadium: Meadowbank Stadium; Attendance: 723; Referee: Graham Grainger

==== Second leg ====
10 May 2025	Annan Athletic	1–2 (5–4 agg.)	Elgin City	Annan
15:00	Muir 1'		Sargent 22'; McDonald 59'	Stadium: Galabank; Attendance: 671; Referee: Euan Anderson

10 May 2025	East Fife	3–0 (3–1 agg.)	Edinburgh City	Methil
15:00	Laaref 26'; McKenna 55'; Trouten 58'			Stadium: Bayview Stadium; Attendance: 1,070; Referee: Lloyd Wilson

=== Final ===
==== First leg ====
13 May 2025	East Fife	3–2	Annan Athletic	Methil
19:30	Trouten 5'; Munro 33', 80'		McKenna 43' (o.g.); A.Smith 49'	Stadium: Bayview Stadium; Attendance: 1,327; Referee: Ross Hardie

==== Second leg ====
16 May 2025	Annan Athletic	1–1 (3–4 agg.)	East Fife	Annan
19:30	Goss 6'		Laaref 37'	Stadium: Galabank; Attendance: 1,304; Referee: Colin Steven
