= Nikola Ujdur =

Croatian-Australian football player

Personal information
- Full name: Nikola Ujdur
- Date of birth: 25 January 1999 (age 27)
- Place of birth: Canberra, Australia
- Position: Defender

Team information
- Current team: Queen's Park
- Number: 6

Youth career
- –2019: GOŠK Gabela

Senior career*
Years	Team	Apps	(Gls)
2019–2021	Northbridge	8	(1)
2021–2022	Sydney Olympic	23	(2)
2022–2023	Rockdale Ilinden	29	(3)
2023–2024	Inverness Caledonian Thistle	16	(1)
2024–2026	Queen's Park	11	(1)
2026–	Canberra Croatia	3	(0)
- * Club domestic league appearances and goals as of 07:15, 2 August 2026 (UTC)

Nikola Ujdur (born 25 January 1999) is an Australian soccer player who plays as a defender for Australian Championship club Canberra Croatia.

== Career ==
=== Early career ===
Ujdur started his career with Bosnian Premier League side, NK GOŠK Gabela, rising through the youth ranks before returning to Australia in 2019, joining Northbridge in the NPL New South Wales division where he stayed for 2 years before moving to Sydney Olympic in 2021, where he won the NSW Premier League Regular Season before moving to Rockdale Ilinden the following season.

=== Inverness Caledonian Thistle ===
On 1 September 2023, Ujdur signed for Scottish Championship side, Inverness Caledonian Thistle, on a 2 year deal, becoming the first Australian to play for the club and the second from the Southern Hemisphere, arriving at the club on the same night as the club's manager, Billy Dodds, was sacked. Ujdur made his debut for Inverness in a 1–0 home loss to Dundee United. Ujdur scored his first goal for the club in a 4–1 win over Queen's Park at Hampden in the Scottish Championship.

=== Queen's Park ===
On 27 July 2024, Ujdur signed for Scottish Championship side, Queen's Park.
