= Sean McAllister (footballer, born 2002) =

Northern Irish footballer

Personal information
- Full name: Sean Paul McAllister
- Date of birth: 15 September 2002 (age 24)
- Place of birth: Randalstown, Northern Ireland
- Position: Midfielder

Team information
- Current team: Dungannon Swifts
- Number: 67

Youth career
- –2019: Dungannon Swifts
- 2019–2021: Everton

Senior career*
| Years | Team | Apps | (Gls) |
| 2019–2025 | Everton | 0 | (0) |
| 2024 | → Inverness Caledonian Thistle (loan) | 8 | (2) |
| 2025 | Marine | 0 | (0) |
| 2025– | Dungannon Swifts | 27 | (7) |
- * Club domestic league appearances and goals as of 29 April 2026

Sean McAllister (born 15 September 2002) is a Northern Irish footballer who plays for NIFL Premiership club Dungannon Swifts.

== Career ==
McAllister started his career as a youth for Dungannon Swifts in the Northern Irish football league, before earning himself a move to English Premier League club, Everton, scoring on his debut for the Under 21s side in a 1–0 away win against Morcambe in the EFL Trophy.

In February 2024, McAllister was sent on loan to Inverness Caledonian Thistle in the Scottish Championship, scoring his first professional goal in a 2–0 away win over Greenock Morton, before being briefly recalled for injury rehab in March. McAllister returned to Inverness in April and scored his second goal for Inverness in a 3–1 home win over Greenock Morton, as Inverness dropped into the relegation playoffs.

In February 2025, McAllister signed for National League North club Marine, but left soon after.

== Career statistics ==
As of match played 31 January 2026

Appearances and goals by club, season and competition
| Club | Season | League | | | National cup (Note: Includes FA Cup, Scottish Cup and Irish Cup) | | League cup (Note: Includes EFL Cup, Scottish League Cup and NIFL Cup) | | Continental | | Other | | Total | |
| Club | Season | Division | Apps | Goals | Apps | Goals | Apps | Goals | Apps | Goals | Apps | Goals | Apps | Goals |
|---|---|---|---|---|---|---|---|---|---|---|---|---|---|---|
| Everton U21 | 2021–22 | — | | | — | | — | | — | | 3 (Note: Appearance(s) in EFL Trophy) | 1 | 3 | 1 |
| Everton U21 | 2022–23 | — | | | — | | — | | — | | 2 | 1 | 2 | 1 |
| Everton U21 | 2023–24 | — | | | — | | — | | — | | 1 | 0 | 1 | 0 |
| Everton U21 | Total | | — | | — | | — | | — | | 6 | 2 | 6 | 2 |
| Everton | 2023–24 | Premier League | 0 | 0 | 0 | 0 | 0 | 0 | — | | — | | 0 | 0 |
| Inverness Caledonian Thistle (loan) | 2023–24 | Scottish Championship | 8 | 2 | 1 | 0 | — | | — | | 2 (Note: Appearance(s) in Scottish Championship play-offs) | 0 | 11 | 2 |
| Marine | 2024–25 | National League North | 0 | 0 | — | | — | | — | | — | | 0 | 0 |
| Dungannon Swifts | 2025–26 | NIFL Premiership | 21 | 6 | 1 | 1 | — | | 2 (Note: Appearance(s) in UEFA Europa Conference League) | 1 | 1 (Note: Appearance(s) in NIFL Charity Shield) | 0 | 25 | 8 |
| Career total | | | 29 | 8 | 2 | 1 | 0 | 0 | 2 | 1 | 9 | 2 | 42 | 12 |
