= Harry Lodovica =

English footballer

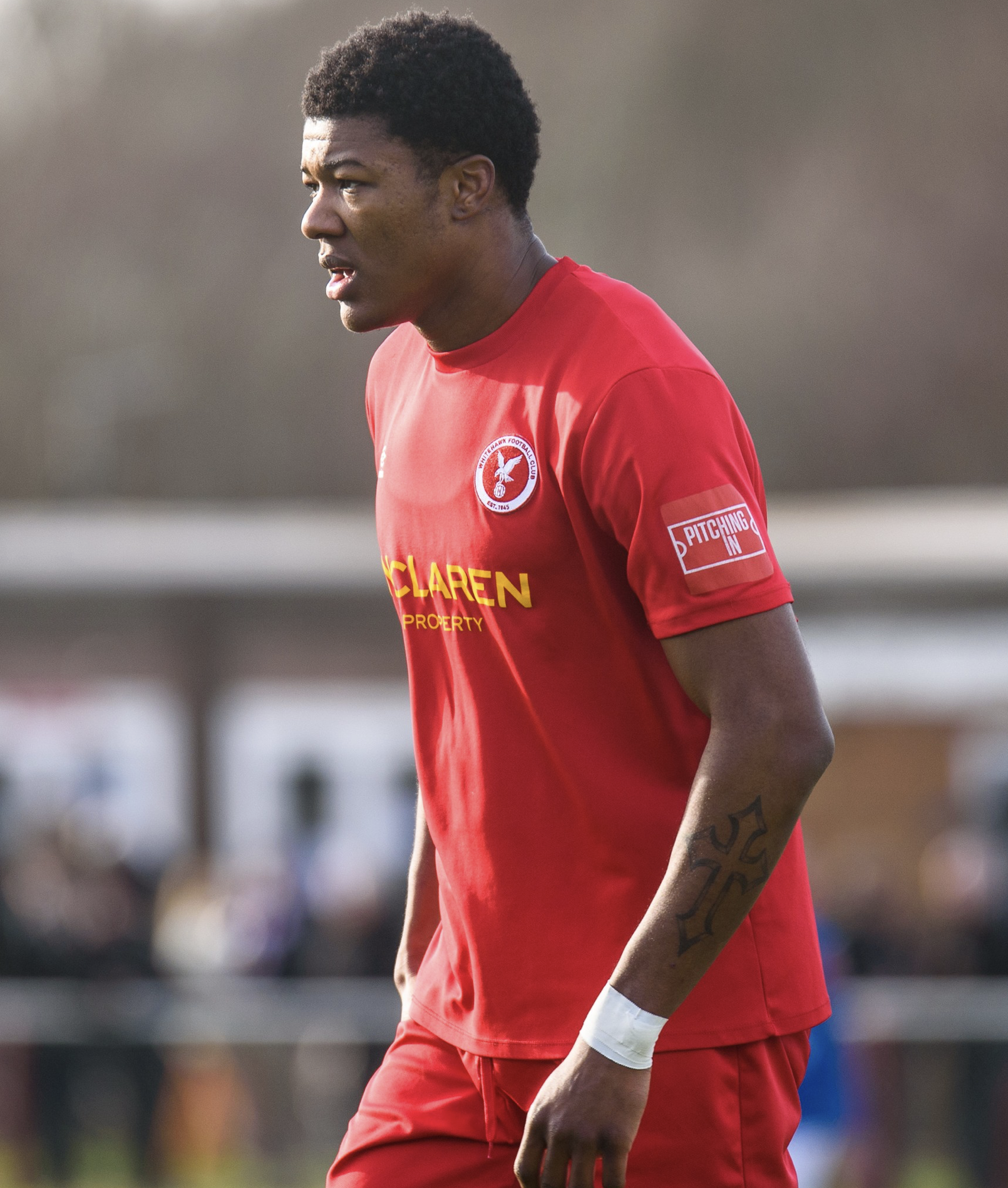

Personal information
- Full name: Harry Alexander Lodovica
- Date of birth: 8 March 1999 (age 27)
- Place of birth: Barnet, England
- Height: 1.95 m (6 ft 5 in)
- Position: Striker

Team information
- Current team: Whitehawk on loan from Enfield Town

Youth career
- 2016-2017: Dagenham & Redbridge

Senior career*
Years	Team	Apps	(Gls)
2017-2018	Codicote	1	(0)
2018-2019	Hendon	0	(0)
2019-2020	Northwood	23	(7)
2020	Chalfont St. Peter	4	(2)
2020-2021	Cheshunt	0	(0)
2021	East Thurrock United	0	(0)
2021–2022	Kempston Rovers	19	(3)
2022	Braintree Town	1	(1)
2022	→ Biggleswade Town (loan)	11	(1)
2022–2023	Chelmsford City	32	(4)
2023	Aveley	0	(0)
2023–2024	Inverness Caledonian Thistle	9	(0)
2024–2025	Maidstone United	5	(0)
2025–	Enfield Town	10	(0)
2025–2026	→ Whitehawk (loan)	27	(9)
- * Club domestic league appearances and goals as of 20:49 30 April 2026 (UTC)

Harry Alexander Lodovica (born 8 March 1999) is an English professional footballer who plays as a forward for Enfield Town.

== Early career ==
In 2016-2017 Lodovica played five times for Dagenham and Redbridge in the EFL Youth Alliance Under 18 competition before signing for Codicote of the Spartan South Midlands Football League on 17 November 2017. He played once in April 2018 before joining Hendon Under-23s.

Lodovica signed for Northwood of the Isthmian South Central Division for the 2019-2020 season, making 23 appearances, all in the league and scoring seven times. In February 2020 he joined Chalfont St Peter in the same league, scoring twice on his debut in a 7-3 defeat at Waltham Abbey.

Lodovica was with Cheshunt of the Isthmian Premier Division for the 2020-2021 season, followed by a month at East Thurrock United before signing for Kempston Rovers of the Southern League Central Division on 18 October 2021. He made 19 appearances, all in the league, and scored three goals before joining Braintree Town of National League South in February 2022. Lodovica was loaned to Biggleswade Town the following month before returning to make his only appearance for his parent club, when he scored the winner at Dartford on 2 May 2022.

On 9 July 2022 Lodovica signed for Chelmsford City, featuring regularly for the whole season. After being offered a new deal at the end of the season he decided to move to Aveley on 7 June 2023.

== Professional career ==
On 30 July 2023, after successful trial games against Elgin City and Nairn County, Lodovica signed his first fully professional contract with Scottish Championship side, Inverness Caledonian Thistle, making his debut the same day, in a 1–0 away loss to Dundee in the Scottish League Cup. On signing Lodovica said it was a dream come true to be playing professional football.

Lodovica made his senior league debut in a 2–1 home loss to Queen's Park on 5 August. He impressed new manager Duncan Ferguson after scoring twice from the bench against Nairn County in a North Scotland Cup semi-final in October 2023. He missed the second half of the season with an ankle injury and was released at the end of his first year.

== Later career ==
In July 2024 Lodovica was back in England trialing with National League South Torquay United. On 13 September 2024, he joined fellow National League South side Maidstone United, but made only five appearances before leaving at the end of the season.

On 24 July 2025, Lodovica joined Enfield Town, also in the National League South.

On 24 October 2025, Lodovica joined Isthmian Premier Division Whitehawk on a three month loan, which was extended in January to the end of the season.
