= Jake Davidson =

Scottish footballer (born 2000)

Personal information
- Date of birth: 6 October 2000 (age 26)
- Place of birth: Stirling, Scotland
- Height: 1.86 m (6 ft 1 in)
- Position: Midfielder

Youth career
- –2017: Dundee United

Senior career*
Years	Team	Apps	(Gls)
2017–2021	Dundee United	0	(0)
2019–2020	→ The Spartans (loan)		
2020	→ Queen's Park (loan)	8	(0)
2020–2021	→ Waterford (loan)	12	(0)
2021	→ Arbroath (loan)	2	(0)
2021–2023	Queen's Park	51	(2)
2023–2026	Inverness Caledonian Thistle	26	(2)
2024	→ Hamilton Academical (loan)	14	(2)
2026	→ The Spartans (loan)	9	(0)
- * Club domestic league appearances and goals as of 13:42, 31 May 2026 (UTC)

Jake Davidson (born 6 October 2000) is a Scottish professional footballer who most recently played as a midfielder for Scottish Championship club Inverness Caledonian Thistle.

== Career ==
Davidson rose through the youth ranks at Dundee United and was promoted to the first team squad in 2017. However, he failed to break into the team and was sent out on loan: in 2019 to Lowland League side Spartans, League Two side Queen's Park, League of Ireland side Waterford, and Scottish Championship side Arbroath.

In 2021, Davidson returned to Queen's Park, now in League One, after leaving Dundee United, and helped the Glasgow club to gain promotion to the second tier for the first time since the 1980s. He scored his first professional goal in a 1–1 League Cup draw with Hamilton Academical in July 2022, then his first SPFL goal a week later against Inverness Caledonian Thistle. He made 34 appearances in the 2022–23 Scottish Championship campaign as the Spiders finished runners-up.

In the summer of 2023, Davidson left Queen's Park for Championship rivals Inverness Caledonian Thistle. He scored on his league debut, ironically against his former club Queen's Park, in a 2–1 loss.

In February 2024, Davidson went on loan to Scottish League One side Hamilton Academical.

On 25 May 2026 it was announced that Davidson was one of 9 players who would be leaving Inverness upon the expiration of his contract.
