= 2012–13 Aberdeenshire Cup =

2012–13 Evening Express Aberdeenshire Cup
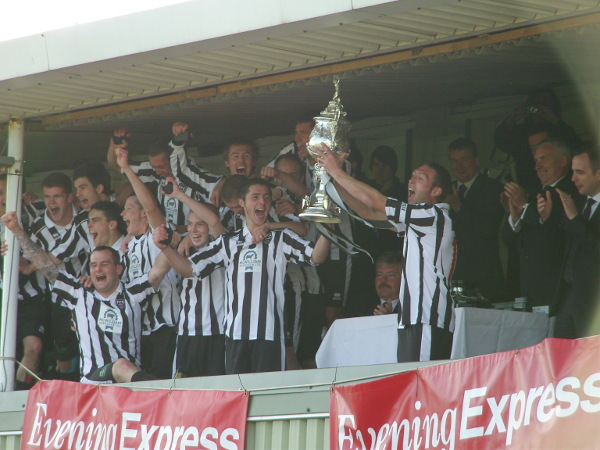
- Fraserburgh lifting the Aberdeenshire Cup

Tournament details
- Country: Scotland
- Teams: 10

Tournament statistics
- Matches played: 9
- Goals scored: 42 (4.67 per match)

The 2012–13 Aberdeenshire Cup was won by Fraserburgh.

== First round ==
7 August 2012	Deveronvale	2–3	Formartine Utd	Princess Royal Park, Banff
20:00 BST				Referee: Thomas Shaw

8 August 2012	Buckie Thistle	1–0	Banks O' Dee	Victoria Park, Buckie
20:00 BST				Referee: Graham Beaton

== Second round ==
15 August 2012	Cove Rangers	0–2	Turriff Utd	Allan Park, Aberdeen
15:00 BST				Referee: Graham Beaton

15 August 2012	Formartine Utd	5–2	Inverurie Loco Works	North Lodge Park, Pitmedden
15:00 BST				Referee: Andy Milne

15 August 2012	Fraserburgh	5–2	Keith	Bellslea Park, Fraserburgh
15:00 BST				Referee: Mat Northcroft

15 August 2012	Huntly	5–3	Buckie Thistle	Christie Park, Huntly
15:00 BST				Referee: Ryan Milne

== Semi finals ==
28 August 2012	Formartine Utd	3–1	Huntly	North Lodge Park, Pitmedden
20:00 BST				Referee: Thomas Shaw

29 August 2012	Turriff Utd	1–3	Fraserburgh	The Haughs, Turriff
20:00 BST				Referee: Mike McNab

== Final ==
15 September 2012
15:00 BST

Formartine Utd	2–2 (a.e.t.)	Fraserburgh
	Evening Express
Penalties
	1–3

Victoria Park, Buckie
Referee: Ryan Milne
