= 2011–12 Highland Football League =

Press & Journal Highland League
- Season: 2011–12
- Champions: Forres Mechanics
- Matches: 306
- Goals: 1,143 (3.74 per match)
- Top goalscorer: Cammy Keith (Keith) (33 goals)
- Biggest home win: Wick Academy 8–1 Fort William; 17 September 2011
- Biggest away win: Fort William 0–9 Nairn County; 4 April 2012
- Highest scoring: Clachnacuddin 7–3 Fraserburgh; 12 May 2012
- Longest winning run: Forres Mechanics (9 games)
- Longest unbeaten run: Forres Mechanics (13 games)
- Longest winless run: Fort William (23 games)
- Longest losing run: Strathspey Thistle (12 games)

The 2011–12 Highland Football League began on 30 July 2011 and ended on 16 May 2012.

The top two clubs at the end of the season, will receive direct entry to the second round of the 2012–13 Scottish Cup. The highest placed two clubs who have obtained an SFA club licence will qualify to enter the 2012–13 Scottish Challenge Cup.

The league was won by Forres Mechanics. It was their first title win since the 1985–86 season. Fort William finished bottom.

== Table ==
Pos	Team	Pld	W	D	L	GF	GA	GD	Pts	Qualification
1	Forres Mechanics (C, Q)	34	24	5	5	85	35	+50	77	Qualification for 2012–13 Scottish Cup Second round
2	Cove Rangers (Q)	34	23	7	4	92	33	+59	76	Qualification for 2012–13 Scottish Cup Second round
3	Nairn County	34	19	9	6	92	44	+48	66	
4	Inverurie Loco Works (Q)	34	20	5	9	71	35	+36	65	Qualification for 2012–13 Scottish Challenge Cup
5	Buckie Thistle	34	18	7	9	79	45	+34	61	
6	Fraserburgh	34	17	8	9	79	63	+16	59	
7	Deveronvale	34	17	4	13	75	49	+26	55	
8	Wick Academy (Q)	34	16	7	11	77	55	+22	55	Qualification for 2012–13 Scottish Challenge Cup
9	Keith	34	16	6	12	85	57	+28	54	
10	Clachnacuddin	34	14	8	12	79	65	+14	50	
11	Formartine United	34	14	7	13	62	60	+2	49	
12	Lossiemouth	34	15	4	15	51	52	−1	49	
13	Huntly	34	14	4	16	50	67	−17	46	
14	Turriff United	34	13	4	17	61	64	−3	43	
15	Rothes	34	7	5	22	31	80	−49	26	
16	Brora Rangers	34	6	2	26	33	115	−82	20	
17	Strathspey Thistle	34	3	2	29	27	102	−75	11	
18	Fort William	34	1	4	29	14	122	−108	7	

Updated to match(es) played on 16 May 2012. Source: Highland Football League
Rules for classification: 1) points; 2) goal difference; 3) number of goals scored.
(C) Champions; (Q) Qualified for the phase indicated

== Results ==
Home \ Away	BRO	BUC	CLA	COV	DEV	FRM	FRR	FRT	FRA	HUN	LOC	KEI	LOS	NAI	ROT	STR	TUR	WIC
Brora Rangers		0–6	2–2	2–5	3–6	0–3	0–3	4–1	2–2	2–1	0–4	3–5	0–2	0–3	1–0	2–1	2–3	1–2
Buckie Thistle	4–0		3–2	1–0	1–0	3–2	1–2	4–0	4–0	0–1	2–2	1–0	1–2	2–2	6–0	2–2	3–2	3–3
Clachnacuddin	5–0	1–3		2–1	3–0	2–0	0–3	6–0	7–3	1–5	2–3	4–1	3–2	1–1	3–1	5–0	1–4	1–2
Cove Rangers	4–0	3–0	1–1		2–1	6–3	1–1	6–0	1–0	4–0	2–1	2–2	1–3	1–1	4–0	6–1	3–0	2–0
Deveronvale	5–0	3–2	3–0	1–2		1–1	1–1	6–0	2–0	3–1	0–1	1–2	0–2	2–4	3–0	3–2	0–3	2–0
Formartine United	4–1	1–1	1–1	1–3	0–3		0–2	4–0	3–3	3–0	2–1	4–2	2–1	1–1	3–2	5–1	2–1	0–2
Forres Mechanics	4–1	2–2	1–1	5–1	3–1	4–2		4–0	1–0	2–0	2–0	0–6	1–0	4–0	3–0	2–1	4–2	2–1
Fort William	1–3	0–6	0–0	0–8	0–6	0–1	0–4		1–6	1–2	0–3	1–1	0–2	0–9	0–0	2–2	0–1	1–3
Fraserburgh	5–0	1–0	5–3	0–3	2–2	3–2	2–1	1–0		2–3	3–3	3–2	3–2	2–0	3–2	4–1	5–1	1–3
Huntly	3–0	0–3	2–2	1–2	1–0	0–0	4–2	2–0	3–3		0–4	4–1	0–1	0–4	1–1	2–0	1–4	2–1
Inverurie Loco Works	6–1	2–0	4–1	2–4	0–3	0–1	0–2	3–0	0–0	3–1		2–1	1–0	0–0	0–1	4–0	4–1	3–0
Keith	4–0	0–2	3–2	1–1	2–3	5–1	2–2	5–2	1–2	1–3	0–1		3–0	1–3	3–1	6–0	5–0	1–1
Lossiemouth	5–0	2–3	2–3	0–3	2–2	2–0	0–3	2–0	1–6	1–2	2–1	2–4		0–2	3–0	1–0	2–1	1–0
Nairn County	6–0	3–2	3–0	0–2	5–2	2–2	2–1	2–0	1–1	5–1	1–3	2–3	3–3		6–2	3–0	2–2	5–0
Rothes	1–3	1–2	2–3	0–3	0–2	1–4	0–4	1–2	1–1	2–1	0–3	0–4	0–0	1–5		3–1	2–1	2–1
Strathspey Thistle	2–0	1–3	0–4	0–2	0–5	1–3	1–7	2–1	1–3	0–1	1–4	2–3	0–2	0–2	0–2		1–0	1–3
Turriff United	1–0	2–2	1–4	2–2	3–1	2–0	0–1	5–0	5–1	4–2	1–2	0–3	1–1	0–1	0–1	3–1		4–3
Wick Academy	6–0	3–1	3–3	1–1	1–2	3–1	3–2	8–1	1–3	5–0	1–1	2–2	3–0	5–3	1–1	4–1	2–1	

Updated to match(es) played on 16 May 2012. Source: Highland Football League
Legend: Blue = home team win; Yellow = draw; Red = away team win.
