= 2015–16 Scottish Cup =

2015–16 William Hill Scottish Cup
Tournament details
- Country: Scotland
- Teams: 92

Final positions
- Champions: Hibernian
- Runners-up: Rangers

Tournament statistics
- Matches played: 112
- Goals scored: 393 (3.51 per match)
- Top goal scorer(s): Peter Weatherson (5 goals)
- All statistics correct as of 21 May 2016.

The 2015–16 Scottish Cup was the 131st season of Scotland's most prestigious football knockout competition. The tournament was sponsored by bookmaker William Hill in what was the fifth season of a five-year partnership. The final was contested between second-tier clubs (Hibernian and Rangers) for the first time ever with no Premiership clubs reaching the final.

The defending champions were Inverness Caledonian Thistle, who defeated Falkirk in the 2015 final, but were eventually knocked out in the Quarter Final after a replay by eventual champions, Hibernian.

== Media coverage ==
From round four onwards, selected matches from the Scottish Cup were broadcast live in Ireland and the UK by BBC Scotland and Sky Sports. BBC Scotland had the option to show one tie per round with Sky Sports showing two ties per round with one replay; also, Sky Sports broadcast both semi-finals live with one also on BBC Scotland and both channels screened the final live.

== Calendar ==
The calendar for the 2015–16 Scottish Cup qualifying rounds, as announced by Scottish Football Association.

Round	Main date	Number of fixtures	Clubs	New Entries
Preliminary round 1	15 August 2015	5	92 → 87	10
Preliminary round 2	5 September 2015	5	87 → 82	5
First round	26 September 2015	18	82 → 64	31
Second round	24 October 2015	16	64 → 48	14
Third round	28 November 2015	16	48 → 32	16
Fourth round	9 January 2016	16	32 → 16	16
Fifth round	6 February 2016	8	16 → 8	None
Quarter-finals	5 March 2016	4	8 → 4	None
Semi-finals	16 & 17 April 2016	2	4 → 2	None
Final	21 May 2016	1	2 → 1	None

== Preliminary rounds ==
=== Preliminary round 1 ===
The preliminary round 1 took place on Saturday 15 August 2015. The round had 15 clubs which included 5 matches and 5 byes to the Second Preliminary Round. The teams competing in this round were made up of teams from the Scottish Highland Football League, Scottish Lowland Football League, ESL, SSL, Scottish Junior FA and the Scottish Amateur FA. It was the first time that the winners of the Scottish Amateur Cup had participated in the Scottish Cup.

==== Draw ====
Hawick Royal Albert, Kelty Hearts, Auchinleck Talbot, Hermes and Lothian Thistle Hutchison Vale all received byes to the preliminary round 2.

==== Matches ====
15 August 2015	Civil Service Strollers	3–0	Newton Stewart	Edinburgh
15:00	Ballantyne 43', 60'; Stewart 75'			Stadium: Christie Gillies Park; Referee: Scott Lambie

15 August 2015	Harestanes	0–3	Girvan	Kilsyth
15:00		Report		Stadium: Duncansfield Park, Referee: Matthew MacDermid

15 August 2015	St Cuthbert Wanderers	3–1	Burntisland Shipyard	Kirkcudbright
15:00				Stadium: St Mary's Park; Referee: Graham Grainger

15 August 2015	Golspie Sutherland	1–6	Cove Rangers	Golspie
15:00	Shewan 20'		Nicol 18', 35'; Redford 21'; Watt 25', 52' (pen.); Scully 34'	Stadium: King George V Park; Referee: Liam Duncan

15 August 2015	Wigtown & Bladnoch	1–0	Vale of Leithen	Wigtown
15:00				Stadium: Trammondford Park; Referee: Chris Graham

=== Preliminary round 2 ===
The preliminary round 2 took place on Saturday 5 September 2015. The round had 10 clubs which included 5 matches. The teams competing in this round were made up of 5 winners from Round 1 and the 5 Byes from Round one.

==== Matches ====
5 September 2015	Civil Service Strollers	0–4	Kelty Hearts	Edinburgh
15:00				Stadium: The Edinburgh Area Civil Service Sports Association; Referee: Grant Irvine

5 September 2015	Hermes	0–4	Auchinleck Talbot	Aberdeen
15:00				Stadium: Uniconn Park; Referee: Lorraine Clark

5 September 2015	Wigtown & Bladnoch	2–3	Hawick Royal Albert	Wigtown
15:00				Stadium: Trammondford Park; Referee: Scott Millar

5 September 2015	Lothian Thistle Hutchison Vale	2–2	Girvan	Edinburgh
15:00				Stadium: Saughton Enclosure; Referee: Stephen Brown

5 September 2015	Cove Rangers	7–2	St Cuthbert Wanderers	Inverurie
15:00				Stadium: Harlaw Park; Referee: Chris Fordyce

==== Replay ====
12 September 2015	Girvan	2–5	Lothian Thistle Hutchison Vale	Girvan
15:00				Stadium: Hamilton Park; Referee: Lloyd Wilson

== First round ==
=== Draw ===
There were 18 ties taking place in Round 1 of the Scottish Cup. The draw took place on Tuesday, 28 August 2015.

Teams in italics were not known at the time of the draw. Teams in Bold advanced to the second round.

Highland Football League	Lowland Football League	Other
**Buckie Thistle**; **Clachnacuddin**; **Cove Rangers**; Deveronvale; **Formartine United**; **Forres Mechanics**; **Fort William**; **Fraserburgh**; **Huntly**; **Inverurie Loco Works**; Keith; Lossiemouth; **Nairn County**; Rothes; Strathspey Thistle; **Wick Academy**	BSC Glasgow; **Cumbernauld Colts**; Dalbeattie Star; **Edinburgh University**; Gala Fairydean Rovers; Gretna 2008; Preston Athletic; Selkirk; **Spartans**; Threave Rovers; **Stirling University**; Whitehill Welfare	East of Scotland League teams: Coldstream; Hawick Royal Albert; **Lothian Thistle Hutchison Vale**; SJFA teams: **Auchinleck Talbot**; Banks O’Dee; Kelty Hearts; **Linlithgow Rose**; SAFA teams: Glasgow University

=== Matches ===
26 September 2015	Banks O' Dee	**2–3**	**Cove Rangers**	Aberdeen
15:00				Stadium: Spain Park; Referee: Peter Stuart

26 September 2015	BSC Glasgow	**2–2**	Auchinleck Talbot	Glasgow
15:00				Stadium: Lochburn Park; Referee: Graham Beaton

26 September 2015	Strathspey Thistle	**1–2**	**Edinburgh University**	Grantown-on-Spey
15:00				Stadium: Seafield Park; Referee: Graham Fraser

26 September 2015	**Lothian Thistle Hutchison Vale**	**3–0**	Kelty Hearts	Edinburgh
15:00				Stadium: Saughton Enclosure; Referee: David Dickinson

26 September 2015	Preston Athletic	**2–3**	**Fort William**	Prestonpans
15:00				Stadium: Pennypit Park; Referee: Garry Doherty

26 September 2015	Lossiemouth	**1–4**	**Forres Mechanics**	Lossiemouth
15:00				Stadium: Grant Park; Referee: David Watt

26 September 2015	Keith	**1–5**	**Inverurie Loco Works**	Keith
15:00				Stadium: Kynoch Park; Referee: Thomas Shaw

26 September 2015	**Spartans**	**5–1**	Coldstream	Edinburgh
15:00				Stadium: Ainslie Park; Referee: Calum Scott

26 September 2015	Hawick Royal Albert	**0–3**	**Huntly**	Hawick
15:00				Stadium: Albert Park; Referee: Kyle Hall

26 September 2015	Deveronvale	**0–5**	**Clachnacuddin**	Banff
15:00				Stadium: Princess Royal Park; Referee: Dan McFarlane

26 September 2015	Threave Rovers	**1–3**	**Stirling University**	Castle Douglas
15:00				Stadium: Meadow Park; Referee: Evan Cairns

26 September 2015	Gala Fairydean Rovers	**0–2**	**Linlithgow Rose**	Galashiels
15:00				Stadium: Netherdale; Referee: Duncan Williams

26 September 2015	**Nairn County**	**5–1**	Selkirk	Nairn
15:00				Stadium: Station Park; Referee: Chris Phillips

26 September 2015	**Buckie Thistle**	**7–0**	Rothes	Buckie
15:00				Stadium: Victoria Park; Referee: George Robertson

26 September 2015	**Fraserburgh**	**3–2**	Dalbeattie Star	Fraserburgh
15:00				Stadium: Bellslea Park; Referee: Liam Duncan

26 September 2015	Wick Academy	**2–2**	Whitehill Welfare	Wick
15:00				Stadium: Harmsworth Park; Referee: Ben Dempster

26 September 2015	**Formartine United**	**3–1**	Gretna 2008	Pitmedden
15:00				Stadium: North Lodge Park; Referee: Steven Traynor

27 September 2015	**Cumbernauld Colts**	**3–0**	Glasgow University	Cumbernauld
15:00				Stadium: Broadwood Stadium; Referee: Duncan Smith

=== Replays ===
3 October 2015	**Auchinleck Talbot**	**5–0**	BSC Glasgow	East Ayrshire
15:00				Stadium: Beechwood Park; Referee: Steven Reid

3 October 2015	Whitehill Welfare	**2–3**	**Wick Academy**	Rosewell
15:00				Stadium: Ferguson Park; Referee: Graham Beaton

== Second round ==
=== Draw ===
There were 16 ties taking place in Round 2 of the Scottish Cup. The draw took place on Thursday, 1 October 2015.

Teams in italics were not known at the time of the draw. Teams in Bold advanced to the third round.

Scottish League Two	Highland Football League	Lowland Football League	Other
**Annan Athletic**; **Arbroath**; Berwick Rangers; Clyde; East Fife; East Stirlingshire; **Elgin City**; Montrose; **Queen's Park**; **Stirling Albion**	Brora Rangers; **Buckie Thistle**; Clachnacuddin; **Cove Rangers**; **Formartine United**; Forres Mechanics; Fort William; **Fraserburgh**; **Huntly**; **Inverurie Loco Works**; Nairn County; Turriff United; **Wick Academy**	**Cumbernauld Colts**; **East Kilbride**; Edinburgh City; Edinburgh University; Spartans; Stirling University	East of Scotland League teams: **Lothian Thistle Hutchison Vale**; SJFA teams: Auchinleck Talbot; **Linlithgow Rose**

=== Matches ===
24 October 2015	**Inverurie Loco Works**	**2–1**	Edinburgh University	Inverurie
15:00	Laing 45'; Hunter 89'		Paterson 15'	Stadium: Harlaw Park; Referee: Dan McFarlane

24 October 2015	**Nairn County**	**2–2**	**Wick Academy**	Nairn
15:00	Mackintosh 44'; Urquhart 80'		Weir 29'; Mackay 78'	Stadium: Station Park; Referee: David Watt

24 October 2015	**Cumbernauld Colts**	**2–0**	Auchinleck Talbot	Cumbernauld
15:00	Broadfoot 65'; Munn 90'			Stadium: Broadwood Stadium; Referee: Lloyd Wilson

24 October 2015	Stirling University	**0–2**	**Queen's Park**	Stirling
15:00			Woods 25', 54'	Stadium: Forthbank Stadium; Referee: Gavin Ross

24 October 2015	Edinburgh City	**1–2**	**Buckie Thistle**	Edinburgh
15:00	McKee 36'		MacRae 72'; MacKinnon 84'; Cheyne (red card) 43'	Stadium: Meadowbank Stadium; Referee: Calum Haswell

24 October 2015	**Formartine United**	**2–0**	Clyde	Pitmedden
15:00	Rodger 33'; Gauld 90'			Stadium: North Lodge Park; Referee: Steven Reid

24 October 2015	**Elgin City**	**1–0**	Spartans	Elgin
15:00	MacPhee 89'			Stadium: Borough Briggs; Referee: Grant Irvine

24 October 2015	**East Kilbride**	**1–1**	**Forres Mechanics**	East Kilbride
15:00	Winter 49'		Khutsishvili 47'	Stadium: K Park Training Academy; Referee: Lorraine Clark

24 October 2015	Brora Rangers	**1–2**	**Arbroath**	Brora
15:00	MacLean 50'		Grehan 29' (pen.); Ramsay 58'	Stadium: Dudgeon Park; Referee: Craig Napier

24 October 2015	**Annan Athletic**	**4–1**	Berwick Rangers	Annan
15:00	Weatherson 63' (pen.), 81'; Todd 69'; Omar 84'; Osadolor (red card) 29'		Coultress 32'; Fairbairn (red card) 29'	Stadium: Galabank; Referee: Gavin Duncan

24 October 2015	**East Fife**	**0–0**	**Stirling Albion**	Methil
15:00			Robertson (red card) 90+1'	Stadium: Bayview Stadium; Referee: Barry Cook

24 October 2015	**Huntly**	**2–1**	East Stirlingshire	Huntly
15:00	Booth 21'; Scoular 28'		McKenna 48' (pen.)	Stadium: Christie Park; Referee: Duncan Smith

24 October 2015	**Lothian Thistle Hutchison Vale**	**1–1**	**Montrose**	Edinburgh
15:00	Wilkies 36'		Campbell 12'	Stadium: Saughton Enclosure; Referee: Graham Beaton

24 October 2015	Clachnacuddin	**1–3**	**Linlithgow Rose**	Inverness
15:00	Lawrie 45+3'		Thom 10'; Weir 54'; Batchelor 67'	Stadium: Grant Street Park; Referee: Chris Phillips

31 October 2015	Turriff United	**2–3**	**Fraserburgh**	Turriff
15:00	McGowan 6'; MacKenzie 48'		Johnston 21'; Lawrence 64'; Hay 90+3'	Stadium: The Haughs; Referee: Graham Fraser

2 November 2015	Fort William	**0–4**	**Cove Rangers**	Fort William
20:00			Nichol 9' (pen.); Watt 23'; J. Smith 44', 82'	Stadium: Claggan Park; Referee: Chris McTiernan

=== Replays ===
31 October 2015	**Wick Academy**	**5–1**	Nairn County	Wick
15:00	Allan 18', 80'; Macadie 21' (pen.); Weir 40'; Mackay 90+5'		Gethins 39'	Stadium: Harmsworth Park; Referee: David Watt

31 October 2015	Forres Mechanics	**2–3**	**East Kilbride**	Forres
15:00	McGovern 34'; Khutsishvili 90+2'		Hastings 8', 17'; Johnstone 89'	Stadium: Mosset Park; Referee: Lorraine Clark

3 November 2015	**Stirling Albion**	**1–0**	East Fife	Stirling
19:30	Doris 14'			Stadium: Forthbank Stadium; Referee: Barry Cook

3 November 2015	Montrose	**1–2** (a.e.t.)	**Lothian Thistle Hutchison Vale**	Montrose
19:45	Masson 31'		Gormley 15'; Hare 97'	Stadium: Links Park; Referee: Graham Beaton

== Third round ==
=== Draw ===
There were 16 ties taking place in Round 3 of the Scottish Cup. The draw took place on Thursday, 29 October 2015 and was conducted by former Scotland manager Alex McLeish, who won the Scottish Cup both as a player and a manager.

Teams in italics were not known at the time of the draw. Teams in Bold advanced to the fourth round.

Scottish Championship	Scottish League One	Scottish League Two	Highland Football League	Lowland Football League	Other
Alloa Athletic; **Dumbarton**; **Falkirk**; **Greenock Morton**; **Livingston**; **Raith Rovers**	**Airdrieonians**; Albion Rovers; Ayr United; Brechin City; **Cowdenbeath**; **Dunfermline Athletic**; **Forfar Athletic**; Peterhead; Stenhousemuir; **Stranraer**	**Annan Athletic**; Arbroath; Elgin City; Queen's Park; **Stirling Albion**	Buckie Thistle; **Cove Rangers**; Formartine United; Fraserburgh; Huntly; Inverurie Loco Works; Wick Academy	Cumbernauld Colts; **East Kilbride**	East of Scotland League teams: **Lothian Thistle Hutchison Vale**; SJFA teams: **Linlithgow Rose**

=== Matches ===
28 November 2015	**Stranraer**	**3–1**	Buckie Thistle	Stranraer
15:00	Nequecaur 13'; McGuigan 54'; Thomson 72'	BBC Sport Report	Napier 55'	Stadium: Stair Park; Attendance: 415; Referee: Barry Cook

28 November 2015	**Queen's Park**	**1–1**	**Forfar Athletic**	Glasgow
15:00	Duggan 30'	BBC Sport Report	Denholm 60'	Stadium: Hampden Park; Attendance: 418; Referee: John McKendrick

28 November 2015	**Formartine United**	**1–1**	**Cove Rangers**	Pitmedden
15:00	Barbour 45'		Nicol 79'	Stadium: North Lodge Park; Attendance: 376; Referee: Scott Millar

28 November 2015	Albion Rovers	**0–2**	**Greenock Morton**	Coatbridge
15:00		BBC Sport Report	Johnstone 41'; McKee 88'	Stadium: Cliftonhill; Attendance: 505; Referee: Greg Aitken

28 November 2015	**Falkirk**	**4–1**	Fraserburgh	Falkirk
15:00	Miller 16', 74', 84'; Vaulks 70'	BBC Sport Report	Lawrence 67'	Stadium: Falkirk Stadium; Attendance: 1,825; Referee: Alan Newlands

28 November 2015	Peterhead	**1–3**	**Livingston**	Peterhead
15:00	McAllister 90' (pen.)	BBC Sport Report	Glen 14'; White 25', 74'	Stadium: Balmoor Stadium; Attendance: 587; Referee: Crawford Allan

28 November 2015	**Huntly**	**1–1**	**Lothian Thistle Hutchison Vale**	Huntly
15:00	Booth 39'		Gormley 70'	Stadium: Christie Park; Attendance: 239; Referee: Gavin Ross

28 November 2015	Elgin City	**1–2**	**Raith Rovers**	Elgin
15:00	Halsman 90'	BBC Sport Report	McCord 39' (pen.); Anderson 54'	Stadium: Borough Briggs; Attendance: 853; Referee: George Salmond

28 November 2015	**Airdrieonians**	**3–1**	Brechin City	Airdrie
15:00	Morgan 5', 25'; Prunty 70'	BBC Sport Report	Jackson 13'	Stadium: Excelsior Stadium; Attendance: 532; Referee: Euan Anderson

28 November 2015	Ayr United	**0–1**	**Dunfermline Athletic**	Ayr
15:00		BBC Sport Report	Geggan 22'	Stadium: Somerset Park; Attendance: 1,576; Referee: Kevin Clancy

28 November 2015	**Inverurie Loco Works**	**4–4**	**Annan Athletic**	Inverurie
15:00	McLean 37', 90'; Hunter 53'; Laing 68'	BBC Sport Report	Weatherson 3', 89'; Swinglehurst 70'; McColm 73'	Stadium: Harlaw Park; Attendance: 340; Referee: Steven Reid

28 November 2015	**Stenhousemuir**	**2–2**	**East Kilbride**	Stenhousemuir
15:00	Scotland 73'; Malcolm 90'	BBC Sport Report	Coll 36'; Winter 59'	Stadium: Ochilview Park; Attendance: 502; Referee: Kevin Graham

28 November 2015	**Cowdenbeath**	**1–1**	**Arbroath**	Cowdenbeath
15:00	Johnston 73'	BBC Sport Report	Whatley 56'	Stadium: Central Park; Attendance: 409; Referee: Brian Colvin

1 December 2015	**Stirling Albion**	**6–0**	Cumbernauld Colts	Stirling
19:45	Doris 15', 49'; Dickson 22'; Beattie 73', 90'; Lander 83'	BBC Sport Report		Stadium: Forthbank Stadium; Attendance: 511; Referee: Don Robertson

8 December 2015	**Dumbarton**	**5–0**	Alloa Athletic	Dumbarton
19:30	McCallum 1'; Fleming 14'; Kirkpatrick 78', 90'; Waters 90'	BBC Sport Report		Stadium: Dumbarton Football Stadium; Attendance: 274; Referee: Stephen Finnie

16 December 2015	**Wick Academy**	**2–2**	**Linlithgow Rose**	Wick
19:45	Macadie 41'; Allan 90+3'	BBC Sport Report	Strickland 27'; Kelbie 50'	Stadium: Harmsworth Park; Referee: Don Robertson

=== Replays ===
5 December 2015	**Cove Rangers**	**4–1**	Formartine United	Inverurie
15:00	Watt 17'; Park 41'; Yule 72'; Milne 82'		Gauld 52'	Stadium: Harlaw Park; Referee: Alan Newlands

5 December 2015	**East Kilbride**	**2–1** (a.e.t.)	Stenhousemuir	East Kilbride
15:00	Smith 6', 101'	BBC Sport report	McMenamin 31'	Stadium: K Park Training Academy; Attendance: 488; Referee: Kevin Graham

5 December 2015	**Forfar Athletic**	**2–1**	Queen's Park	Forfar
15:00	Travis 45'; Templeman 77'	BBC Sport report	McKernon 52'	Stadium: Station Park; Attendance: 520; Referee: John McKendrick

7 December 2015	Arbroath	**2–4**	**Cowdenbeath**	Arbroath
19:45	Linn 42', 51'	BBC Sport Report	Spence 14'; Callaghan 21'; Brett 37', 40' (pen.)	Stadium: Gayfield Park; Attendance: 500; Referee: Craig Charleston

7 December 2015	**Lothian Thistle Hutchison Vale**	**3–0**	Huntly	Edinburgh
20:00	MacKenzie 22'; Kerr 54'; Smith 83' (pen.)			Stadium: Ainslie Park; Attendance: 365; Referee: Grant Irvine

8 December 2015	**Annan Athletic**	**1–0**	Inverurie Loco Works	Annan
19:45	Weatherson 44'	BBC Sport Report		Stadium: Galabank; Attendance: 287; Referee: Steven Reid

22 December 2015	**Linlithgow Rose**	**5–1**	Wick Academy	Linlithgow
19:30	Weir 20'; Baptie 32'; Strickland 36'; Ruari MacLennan 52', 66'	BBC Sport Report	S. Mackay 4'; Campbell (red card) 24'; D. Allan (yellow card) 57' (red card)	Stadium: Prestonfield; Attendance: 1,500; Referee: Nick Walsh

== Fourth round ==
=== Draw ===
There were 16 ties taking place in Round 4 of the Scottish Cup. The draw took place on Tuesday, 1 December 2015.

Teams in italics were not known at the time of the draw. Teams in Bold advanced to the fifth round.

Scottish Premiership	Scottish Championship	Scottish League One	Scottish League Two	Other
Aberdeen; **Celtic**; **Dundee**; **Dundee United**; Hamilton Academical; **Heart of Midlothian**; **Inverness Caledonian Thistle**; **Kilmarnock**; **Motherwell**; **Partick Thistle**; **Ross County**; St Johnstone	**Dumbarton**; Falkirk; **Greenock Morton**; **Hibernian**; Livingston; Queen of the South; Raith Rovers; **Rangers**; St Mirren	Airdrieonians; Cowdenbeath; Dunfermline Athletic; Forfar Athletic; Stranraer	**Annan Athletic**; Stirling Albion	Highland Football League: Cove Rangers; Lowland Football League: **East Kilbride**; East of Scotland League: Lothian Thistle Hutchison Vale; SJFA East Region Super League: **Linlithgow Rose**

=== Matches ===
8 January 2016	St Mirren	**1–2**	**Partick Thistle**	Paisley
19:30	Watson 88'	BBC Sport Report	Seaborne 62'; Amoo 73'	Stadium: St Mirren Park; Attendance: 4,572; Referee: Craig Thomson

9 January 2016	**Linlithgow Rose**	**3–3**	**Forfar Athletic**	Linlithgow
13:30	MacLennan 39'; Thom (red card) 49'; McKenzie 65'; Weir 66'	BBC Sport Report	Travis 32'; Campbell 50' (pen.); Swankie 53'	Stadium: Prestonfield; Attendance: 2,153; Referee: Stephen Finnie

9 January 2016	St Johnstone	**0–1**	**Kilmarnock**	Perth
15:00		BBC Sport Report	Slater 6'	Stadium: McDiarmid Park; Attendance: 3,147; Referee: Kevin Clancy

9 January 2016	**Dunfermline Athletic**	**2–2**	**Ross County**	Dunfermline
15:00	El Bakhtaoui 15'; McKay 56'	BBC Sport Report	Schalk 4'; Graham 27' (pen.)	Stadium: East End Park; Attendance: 3,439; Referee: Alan Muir

9 January 2016	**Stirling Albion**	**0–0**	**Inverness Caledonian Thistle**	Stirling
15:00		BBC Sport Report		Stadium: Forthbank Stadium; Attendance: 1,224; Referee: Mat Northcroft

9 January 2016	Livingston	**0–1**	**Greenock Morton**	Livingston
15:00		BBC Sport Report	O'Ware 65'	Stadium: Almondvale Stadium; Attendance: 873; Referee: Craig Charleston

9 January 2016	**Dumbarton**	**2–1**	Queen of the South	Dumbarton
15:00	Fleming 17', 57'	BBC Sport Report	Lyle 52'	Stadium: Dumbarton Football Stadium; Attendance: 680; Referee: George Salmond

9 January 2016	**Motherwell**	**5–0**	Cove Rangers	Motherwell
15:00	Moult 2'; McDonald 6'; Johnson 34'; Pearson 44', 61'	BBC Sport Report		Stadium: Fir Park; Attendance: 3,833; Referee: Euan Anderson

9 January 2016	Airdrieonians	**0–1**	**Dundee United**	Airdrie
15:00		BBC Sport Report	Spittal 79'	Stadium: Excelsior Stadium; Attendance: 2,330; Referee: Greg Aitken

9 January 2016	**Annan Athletic**	**4–1**	Hamilton Academical	Annan
15:00	Flynn 6'; Todd 47'; Omar 66', 71'	BBC Sport Report	Docherty 65'	Stadium: Galabank; Attendance: 817; Referee: Barry Cook

9 January 2016	Raith Rovers	**0–2**	**Hibernian**	Kirkcaldy
15:00		BBC Sport Report	McGregor 61'; Malonga 64'	Stadium: Stark's Park; Attendance: 5,203; Referee: Willie Collum

9 January 2016	**Heart of Midlothian**	**1–0**	Aberdeen	Edinburgh
17:30	Paterson 3'	BBC Sport Report		Stadium: Tynecastle Stadium; Attendance: 13,595; Referee: John Beaton

10 January 2016	**Rangers**	**5–1**	Cowdenbeath	Glasgow
13:00	Wallace 19'; McKay 33'; Waghorn 48', 55' (pen.), 78' (pen.)	BBC Sport Report	Brett 40'	Stadium: Ibrox Stadium; Attendance: 20,915; Referee: Steven McLean

10 January 2016	Stranraer	**0–3**	**Celtic**	Stranraer
15:15		BBC Sport Report	Griffiths 18', 84'; Cole 42'	Stadium: Stair Park; Attendance: 4,051; Referee: Andrew Dallas

20 January 2016	**East Kilbride**	**2–0**	Lothian Thistle Hutchison Vale	East Kilbride
19:45	J. Smith 40'; Winter 87'	BBC Sport Report		Stadium: K Park Training Academy; Attendance: 660; Referee: Nick Walsh

26 January 2016	**Dundee**	**3–1**	Falkirk	Dundee
19:45	Hemmings 39', 60'; Harkins 74'	BBC Sport Report	Watson 41'	Stadium: Dens Park; Attendance: 4,279; Referee: Willie Collum

=== Replays ===
12 January 2016	**Ross County**	**1–0**	Dunfermline Athletic	Dingwall
19:45	De Vita 70'	BBC Sport Report		Stadium: Global Energy Stadium; Attendance: 2,041; Referee: Alan Muir

19 January 2016	**Inverness Caledonian Thistle**	**2–0**	Stirling Albion	Inverness
19:45	Mbuyi-Mutombo 28'; Vigurs 61'	BBC Sport Report		Stadium: Caledonian Stadium; Attendance: 1,231; Referee: Mat Northcroft

26 January 2016	Forfar Athletic	**0–1** (a.e.t.)	**Linlithgow Rose**	Forfar
19:45		BBC Sport Report	Kelbie 115'	Stadium: Station Park; Attendance: 1,168; Referee: John Beaton

== Fifth round ==
=== Draw ===
There were 8 ties taking place in Round 5 of the Scottish Cup. The draw took place on Monday, 11 January 2016.

Teams in italics were not known at the time of the draw. Teams in Bold advanced to the quarter-finals.

Scottish Premiership	Scottish Championship	Scottish League Two	Other
**Celtic**; **Dundee**; **Dundee United**; Heart of Midlothian; **Inverness Caledonian Thistle**; Kilmarnock; Motherwell; Partick Thistle; **Ross County**	Dumbarton; **Greenock Morton**; **Hibernian**; **Rangers**	Annan Athletic	Lowland Football League: East Kilbride; SJFA teams: Linlithgow Rose

=== Matches ===
6 February 2016	**Rangers**	**0–0**	**Kilmarnock**	Glasgow
12:30		BBC Sport report	Higginbotham (red card) 89'	Stadium: Ibrox Stadium; Attendance: 33,581; Referee: Bobby Madden

6 February 2016	Motherwell	**1–2**	**Inverness Caledonian Thistle**	Motherwell
15:00	McDonald 67'	BBC Sport report	Storey 39'; Roberts 90+1'	Stadium: Fir Park; Attendance: 3,907; Referee: Steven McLean

6 February 2016	**Dundee United**	**1–0**	Partick Thistle	Dundee
15:00	Fraser 85'	BBC Sport report		Stadium: Tannadice Park; Attendance: 5,803; Referee: Willie Collum

6 February 2016	**Ross County**	**4–2**	Linlithgow Rose	Dingwall
15:00	Quinn 4'; Graham 58', 78'; Schalk 63'	BBC Sport report	Reckord 44' (o.g.); Ruari MacLennan 76'	Stadium: Victoria Park; Attendance: 2,208; Referee: Euan Anderson

6 February 2016	Annan Athletic	**1–4**	**Greenock Morton**	Annan
15:00	Flynn 76'	BBC Sport report	McCluskey 21', 65', 68'; McKee 45+2'	Stadium: Galabank; Attendance: 756; Referee: John Beaton

6 February 2016	**Dumbarton**	**0–0**	**Dundee**	Dumbarton
15:00		BBC Sport report		Stadium: Dumbarton Football Stadium; Attendance: 1,410; Referee: Stephen Finnie

7 February 2016	**Heart of Midlothian**	**2–2**	**Hibernian**	Edinburgh
12:30	Djoum 32'; Nicholson 44'	BBC Sport Report	Cummings 80'; Hanlon 90'	Stadium: Tynecastle Stadium; Attendance: 16,845; Referee: Craig Thomson

7 February 2016	East Kilbride	**0–2**	**Celtic**	Airdrie
15:00		BBC Sport Report	Griffiths 21'; Kazim-Richards 50'	Stadium: Excelsior Stadium; Attendance: 7,767; Referee: George Salmond

=== Replays ===
16 February 2016	**Hibernian**	**1–0**	Hearts	Edinburgh
19:45	Cummings 4', (yellow card) 78' (red card)	BBC Sport Report	Augustyn (yellow card) 76' (red card)	Stadium: Easter Road; Attendance: 19,433; Referee: John Beaton

16 February 2016	Kilmarnock	**1–2**	**Rangers**	Kilmarnock
19:45	McKenzie 7'	BBC Sport Report	Waghorn 3'; Clark 90'	Stadium: Rugby Park; Attendance: 13,179; Referee: Bobby Madden

23 February 2016	**Dundee**	**5–0**	Dumbarton	Dundee
19:45	McGinn 16'; Hemmings 29'; Stewart 51', 90'; Holt 79'	BBC Sport Report		Stadium: Dens Park; Attendance: 3,532; Referee: Stephen Finnie

== Quarter-finals ==
=== Draw ===
There were four ties taking place in the quarter-finals of the Scottish Cup. The draw took place on Monday, 8 February 2016 and was conducted by Scottish Cup winner and former Celtic midfielder Ľubomír Moravčík. The draw, broadcast live on Sky Sports News, has become infamous since it had to be aborted due to one ball breaking open in the pot. After a delay, the draw was completed successfully at the second attempt.

All matches were played on the weekend of 5/6 March 2016.

Teams in italics were not known at the time of the draw. Teams in Bold advanced to the semi-finals.

Scottish Premiership	Scottish Championship
**Celtic**; Dundee; **Dundee United**; Inverness Caledonian Thistle; Ross County	Greenock Morton; **Hibernian**; **Rangers**

=== Matches ===
5 March 2016	**Rangers**	**4–0**	Dundee	Glasgow
12:30	Forrester 1'; Holt 47'; Halliday 54'; Wallace 84'	BBC Sport Report		Stadium: Ibrox Stadium; Attendance: 30,944; Referee: Alan Muir

5 March 2016	Ross County	**2–3**	**Dundee United**	Dingwall
15:00	Boyce 24'; Graham 60' (pen.)	BBC Sport Report	Anier 57', 65'; Durnan (red card) 59'; McKay 89'	Stadium: Global Energy Stadium; Attendance: 3,052; Referee: Craig Thomson

6 March 2016	**Celtic**	**3–0**	Greenock Morton	Glasgow
12:00	Griffiths 14'; Mackay-Steven 25'; McGregor 35'	BBC Sport Report		Stadium: Celtic Park; Attendance: 14,858; Referee: Willie Collum

6 March 2016	**Hibernian**	**1–1**	**Inverness Caledonian Thistle**	Edinburgh
14:00	Keatings 54'	BBC Sport Report	Mbuyi-Mutombo 77'	Stadium: Easter Road; Attendance: 9,884; Referee: Crawford Allan

=== Replays ===
16 March 2016	Inverness Caledonian Thistle	**1–2**	**Hibernian**	Inverness
19:45	Vigurs 77'	BBC Sport Report	Stokes 36', 41'	Stadium: Caledonian Stadium; Attendance: 3,207; Referee: Stephen Finnie

== Semi-finals ==
=== Draw ===
The draw took place on Sunday, 6 March 2016 live on Sky Sports News HQ. Both matches were played on the weekend of 16/17 April 2016.

Teams in italics were not known at the time of the draw. Teams in Bold advanced to the final.

Scottish Premiership	Scottish Championship
Celtic; Dundee United	**Hibernian**; **Rangers**

=== Matches ===
16 April 2016	**Hibernian**	**0–0** (a.e.t.) (**4–2** p)	Dundee United	Glasgow
12:15		Report		Stadium: Hampden Park; Attendance: 19,651; Referee: John Beaton
	**Penalties**
	McGinn (penalty scored); Hanlon (penalty scored); Boyle (penalty scored); Cummings (penalty scored)		(penalty missed) Spittal; (penalty missed) Mckay; (penalty scored) Dixon; (penalty scored) Demel

17 April 2016	**Rangers**	**2–2** (a.e.t.) (**5–4** p)	Celtic	Glasgow
12:00	Miller 16'; McKay 96'	Report	Sviatchenko 50'; Rogic 106'	Stadium: Hampden Park; Attendance: 50,069; Referee: Craig Thomson
	**Penalties**
	Halliday (penalty scored); Tavernier (penalty missed); McKay (penalty scored); Clark (penalty missed); Wallace (penalty scored); Zelalem (penalty scored); Law (penalty scored)		(penalty scored) Mulgrew; (penalty missed) McGregor; (penalty scored) Bitton; (penalty missed) Brown; (penalty scored) Griffiths; (penalty scored) Lustig; (penalty missed) Rogic

== Final ==
21 May 2016
15:00

Rangers	2–3	Hibernian
Miller 27'; Halliday 64'	BBC Sport Report	Stokes 3', 80'; Gray 90+2'

Hampden Park, Glasgow
Attendance: 50,701
Referee: Steven McLean

== Statistics ==
=== Top goalscorers ===
As of matches played on 21 May 2016

Rank	Player	Club	Goals
1	(England) Peter Weatherson	Annan Athletic	5
2	(Scotland) Leigh Griffiths	Celtic	4
2	(Republic of Ireland) Anthony Stokes	Hibernian	4
2	(Scotland) Ruari MacLennan	Linlithgow Rose	4
2	(England) Martyn Waghorn	Rangers	4
2	(Scotland) Brian Graham	Ross County	4
7	9 players		3

- NB: Scorers include only those goals from players which were scored from the second round onwards
