= 2012–13 Scottish Cup =

2012–13 William Hill Scottish Cup
Tournament details
- Country: Scotland
- Teams: 84

Final positions
- Champions: Celtic
- Runners-up: Hibernian

Tournament statistics
- Matches played: 99
- Goals scored: 360 (3.64 per match)
- Top goal scorer: Jon Daly (5)

The 2012–13 Scottish Cup was the 128th season of Scotland's most prestigious football knockout competition. The tournament began on 4 August 2012 and ended on 26 May 2013. It was sponsored by bookmaker William Hill in the second season of a three-year partnership and is known as the William Hill Scottish Cup. The winner of the competition qualified for the third qualifying round of the 2013–14 UEFA Europa League. The holders Hearts were knocked out by their Edinburgh rivals Hibernian in the fourth round, in a repeat of the previous season's final.

== Format and Calendar ==
Due to an increase in the number of participating teams, there was a preliminary round involving four teams. Thirty four other clubs from the Highland League, qualifying Junior clubs and other clubs affiliated with the Scottish Football Association were given a bye to the first round proper. Third Division clubs enter in the second round, while Second Division and some First Division clubs start in the third round. The remaining First Division and all Scottish Premier League (SPL) clubs enter in the fourth round (last 32). The fourth round was played in early December 2012, to allow SPL clubs a brief winter shutdown in January.

For the first time in its history, the Scottish Cup Final was due to be played on a Sunday. This is to comply with UEFA regulations which prohibit televised matches being played on the same day as the UEFA Champions League Final. The 2012 Scottish Cup Final was played on the same day as the 2012 UEFA Champions League Final, but this was done under a one-year waiver offered by UEFA. Fixture congestion meant that the 2013 Scottish Cup Final could not be moved to an earlier weekend.

The calendar for the 2012–13 competition is as follows:

| Round | Draw date | First match date | Fixtures | | Clubs |
| Round | Draw date | First match date | Original | Replays | Clubs |
|---|---|---|---|---|---|
| Preliminary round | Tuesday 3 July 2012 | Saturday 4 August 2012 | 2 | 0 | 84 → 82 |
| First round | Monday 23 July 2012 | Saturday 25 August 2012 | 18 | 3 | 82 → 64 |
| Second round | Monday 27 August 2012 | Saturday 29 September 2012 | 16 | 3 | 64 → 48 |
| Third round | Monday 1 October 2012 | Saturday 3 November 2012 | 16 | 7 | 48 → 32 |
| Fourth round | Monday 5 November 2012 | Saturday 1 December 2012 | 16 | 4 | 32 → 16 |
| Fifth round | Monday 3 December 2012 | Saturday 2 February 2013 | 8 | 0 | 16 → 8 |
| Quarter-finals | Sunday 3 February 2013 | Saturday 2 March 2013 | 4 | 0 | 8 → 4 |
| Semi-finals | Monday 4 March 2013 | Saturday 13 & Sunday 14 April 2013 | 2 | N/A | 4 → 2 |
| Final | N/A | Sunday 26 May 2013 | 1 | N/A | 2 → 1 |

== Preliminary round ==
The preliminary round draw was conducted on 3 July 2012 at Hampden Park, Glasgow.

This round is contested entirely by non-league clubs:

- Fifteen SFA full member clubs from the Highland Football League: (Brora Rangers, Buckie Thistle, Clachnacuddin, Deveronvale, Formartine United, Fort William, Fraserburgh, Huntly, Inverurie Loco Works, Keith, Lossiemouth, Nairn County, Rothes, Turriff United and Wick Academy)
- Twelve SFA full member clubs from the East of Scotland League: (Burntisland Shipyard, Civil Service Strollers, Coldstream, Edinburgh City, Edinburgh University, Gala Fairydean, Hawick Royal Albert, Preston Athletic, Selkirk, Spartans, Vale of Leithen, Whitehill Welfare)
- Four SFA full member clubs from the South of Scotland League: (Newton Stewart, St Cuthbert Wanderers, Threave Rovers, Wigtown & Bladnoch)
- Three SFA full member clubs in other leagues: (Girvan, Glasgow University, Golspie Sutherland)
- Four qualifiers from the Scottish Junior Football Association: (Bonnyrigg Rose Athletic, Hermes, Irvine Meadow, Shotts Bon Accord)

Thirty four clubs received a bye into the first round.

| 4 August 2012 | Fort William | 1–3 | Preston Athletic | Claggan Park, Fort William |
| 15:00 | David Forbes 25' | | 19', 41' Sean Martin; 86' Kevin Morrison | Referee: David Munro |

| 4 August 2012 | Keith | 0–1 | St Cuthbert Wanderers | Kynoch Park, Keith |
| 15:00 | | | 60' Craig Rudd | Referee: Nick Walsh |

== First round ==
The first round draw took place on 23 July 2012 at the Queen Anne Suite, Edinburgh Castle, at 2:00pm.

This round was contested by the winners of the two preliminary round ties plus the thirty four clubs who received a bye in the preliminary round.

| 25 August 2012 | Threave Rovers | 0–1 | Vale of Leithen | Meadow Park, Castle Douglas |
| 15:00 | | | 49' Danny Noon | Referee: Nick Walsh |

| 25 August 2012 | Bonnyrigg Rose Athletic | 2–1 | Girvan | New Dundas Park, Bonnyrigg |
| 15:00 | Paul Shields 6'; Kris Renton 28' | | 53' (pen.) Darren Mitchell | Referee: Craig Napier |

| 25 August 2012 | Huntly | 2–2 | Wigtown & Bladnoch | Christie Park, Huntly |
| 15:00 | Barry Somers 59', 74' | | 15' Robert Jamieson; 33' Jamie McHarrie | Referee: Andy Milne |

| 25 August 2012 | Shotts Bon Accord | 1–1 | Edinburgh City | Hannah Park, Shotts |
| 15:00 | Ruaraidh Scott 34' (o.g.) | | 80' Paul Devlin | Referee: Steven Kirkland |

| 25 August 2012 | Irvine Meadow | 4–0 | Gala Fairydean | Meadow Park, Irvine |
| 15:00 | Tom Brighton 27', 61', 85'; Richie Barr 42' | | | Referee: Duncan Williams |

| 25 August 2012 | Edinburgh University | 1–2 | St Cuthbert Wanderers | Peffermill, Edinburgh |
| 15:00 | Dean Thomson 55' (o.g.) | | 9' Ian Miller; 36' Andy Corcoran | Referee: Grant Irvine |

| 25 August 2012 | Formartine United | 3–2 | Brora Rangers | North Lodge Park, Pitmedden |
| 15:00 | Hamish Munro 6', 13'; Daniel Park 21' (pen.) | | 64' Steven Mackay; 70' Craig Campbell | Referee: Graham Beaton |

| 25 August 2012 | Civil Service Strollers | 4–0 | Newton Stewart | Civil Service Sports Association, Edinburgh |
| 15:00 | Darren Aird 32'; Craig Pimms 50'; Stewart O'Neill 58', 85' | | | Referee: Alan Newlands |

| 25 August 2012 | Spartans | 0–2 | Wick Academy | Ainslie Park, Edinburgh |
| 15:00 | | | 45' Grant Steven; 45' Lukasz Geruzel | Referee: Gavin Duncan |

| 25 August 2012 | Glasgow University | 0–2 | Selkirk | Garscube Sports Complex, Glasgow |
| 15:00 | | | 3' David Battle; 46' Aaron Butters | Referee: Paul O'Neill |

| 25 August 2012 | Clachnacuddin | 2–1 | Lossiemouth | Grant Street Park, Inverness |
| 15:00 | Scott Graham 46'; Blair Lawrie 81' | | 88' Ross Archibald | Referee: Ryan Milne |

| 25 August 2012 | Hawick Royal Albert | 1–4 | Golspie Sutherland | Albert Park, Hawick |
| 15:00 | Lawrie Cannon 89' | | 16' (pen.) Shane Sutherland; 60', 88' Ronnie Jones; 83' Shaun Kerr | Referee: James Campbell |

| 25 August 2012 | Fraserburgh | 4–0 | Coldstream | Bellslea Park, Fraserburgh |
| 15:00 | Ryan Christie 24'; Mark Cowie 37'; Scott Barbour 38'; Graham Johnstone 77' | | | Referee: Craig Sim |

| 25 August 2012 | Whitehill Welfare | 2–4 | Inverurie Loco Works | Ferguson Park, Rosewell |
| 15:00 | Steven Manson 60'; Aaron Somerville 63' | | 29' Andrew Bagshaw; 44' (pen.) Ryan Broadhurst; 52' Steven Park; 74' Stuart McKay | Referee: Gavin Ross |

| 25 August 2012 | Buckie Thistle | 0–0 | Rothes | Victoria Park, Buckie |
| 15:00 | | | | Referee: Morag Pirie |

| 25 August 2012 | Hermes | 1–4 | Deveronvale | Lochside Park, Bridge of Don |
| 15:00 | Keith Wilson 38' | | 3' (pen.), 25' Scott Fraser; 14' Graeme Watt; 68' Kris Duncan | Referee: Mike McNab |

| 25 August 2012 | Preston Athletic | 0–2 | Nairn County | Pennypit Park, Prestonpans |
| 15:00 | | | 3', 48' Conor Gethins | Referee: Steven Reid |

| 25 August 2012 | Turriff United | 6–1 | Burntisland Shipyard | The Haughs, Turriff |
| 15:00 | Ross Anderson 6'; Paul Campbell 7', 12'; Gary Harris 37', 50'; Stephen Gauld 82' | | 39' Craig Hutt | Referee: Graham Fraser |

=== First round Replays ===
| 1 September 2012 | Edinburgh City | 4–1 | Shotts Bon Accord | Meadowbank Stadium, Edinburgh |
| 15:00 | Ross Guthrie 11'; Ruaridh Scott 53'; Douglas Gair 78'; Andy Howat 83' | | 90' (pen.) Antonio Jaconelli |

| 1 September 2012 | Rothes | 0–4 | Buckie Thistle | Mackessack Park, Rothes |
| 15:00 | | | 29' Neil Davidson; 31', 32' (pen.), 63' Zander Sutherland | Referee: Morag Pirie |

| 1 September 2012 | Wigtown & Bladnoch | 0–2 | Huntly | Trammondford Park, Wigtown |
| 15:00 | | | 7' Barry Somers; 57' Andrzej Kleczkowski | Referee: David Lowe |

== Second round ==
The second round draw took place on 27 August 2012. All ten teams from the Third Division were added to the competition at this stage, along with the champions of the South of Scotland League (Dalbeattie Star) and East of Scotland League (Stirling University), and the champions and runners-up from the Highland League (Forres Mechanics and Cove Rangers).

| 29 September 2012 | Cove Rangers | 7–0 | Golspie Sutherland | Allan Park, Aberdeen |
| 15:00 | Connor Scully 2'; Alan Redford 27'; Richie Singer 31'; Ronnie Jones 63' (o.g.); Blair Yule 69'; Jordan Leyden 74'; Eric Watson 90' | | | Referee: David Munro |

| 29 September 2012 | Fraserburgh | 1–2 | East Stirlingshire | Bellslea Park, Fraserburgh |
| 15:00 | Graham Johnstone 60' | | 13' David Greenhill; 26' Kevin Turner | Referee: Don Robertson |

| 29 September 2012 | Forres Mechanics | 0–1 | Rangers | Mosset Park, Forres |
| 15:00 | | | 16' Kal Naismith | Referee: Crawford Allan |

| 29 September 2012 | Clachnacuddin | 4–2 | Formartine United | Grant Street Park, Inverness |
| 15:00 | Stephen Jeffrey 21' (o.g.); Scott Graham 38'; Alan Pollock 55', 57' | | 32' Daniel Park; 61' Callum Dingwall | Referee: Martin Kerrigan |

| 29 September 2012 | Civil Service Strollers | 1–2 | Turriff United | Civil Service Sports Association, Edinburgh |
| 15:00 | Ross Anderson 65' (o.g.) | | 3' Cameron Bowden; 25' David MacKenzie | Referee: Steven Reid |

| 29 September 2012 | Montrose | 1–3 | Edinburgh City | Links Park, Montrose |
| 15:00 | Paul Lunan 45' | | 11', 73' Robbie Ross; 79' Scott Fusco | Referee: Graham Beaton |

| 29 September 2012 | Buckie Thistle | 0–0 | Annan Athletic | Victoria Park, Buckie |
| 15:00 | | | | Referee: Gavin Duncan |

| 29 September 2012 | Berwick Rangers | 1–0 | Wick Academy | Shielfield Park, Berwick upon Tweed |
| 15:00 | Lee Currie 84' (pen.) | | | Referee: James Campbell |

| 29 September 2012 | Selkirk | 1–1 | Vale of Leithen | Yarrow Park, Selkirk |
| 15:00 | Euan Pritchard 25' | | 79' Stephen Sproule | Referee: Craig Napier |

| 29 September 2012 | Inverurie Loco Works | 4–3 | Huntly | Harlaw Park, Inverurie |
| 15:00 | Łukasz Stasiak 25' (o.g.); Neil Gauld 68', 70'; Stuart MacKay 80' | | 32' Russell Guild; 35' David Booth; 54' Neil Davidson | Referee: Alan Newlands |

| 29 September 2012 | Deveronvale | 3–2 | Peterhead | Princess Royal Park, Banff |
| 15:00 | Chris Blackhall 7'; Graeme Rodger 9'; Scott Fraser 37' | | 81' Ross Smith; 84' Bryan Deasley | Referee: Ryan Milne |

| 29 September 2012 | Elgin City | 3–1 | St Cuthbert Wanderers | Borough Briggs, Elgin |
| 15:00 | Brian Cameron 26'; Stuart Leslie 35'; Craig Gunn 40' | | 64' (pen.) Ian Miller | Referee: Michael Taylor |

| 29 September 2012 | Dalbeattie Star | 0–5 | Stirling Albion | Islecroft Stadium, Dalbeattie |
| 15:00 | | | 26' (pen.), 30' Steven Weir; 53', 71' Jordan White; 88' Greig McDonald | Referee: Nick Walsh |

| 29 September 2012 | Queen's Park | 3–0 | Irvine Meadow | Hampden Park, Glasgow |
| 15:00 | Jamie Longworth 63' (pen.); Lawrence Shankland 65'; Tony Quinn 68' | | | Referee: Des Roache |

| 29 September 2012 | Stirling University | 0–1 | Bonnyrigg Rose Athletic | University of Stirling, Stirling |
| 15:00 | | | 80' Kris Renton | Referee: Grant Irvine |

| 29 September 2012 | Clyde | 3–3 | Nairn County | Broadwood Stadium, Cumbernauld |
| 15:00 | Kevin Watt 25'; Bryan Gilfillan 49'; Stefan McCluskey 86' | | Conor Gethins 18', 50'; Gregg Main 32' | Referee: Gavin Ross |

=== Second round Replays ===
| 6 October 2012 | Annan Athletic | 1–2 | Buckie Thistle | Galabank, Annan |
| 15:00 | Scott Chaplain 48' | | 59', 77' Zander Sutherland | Referee: Gavin Duncan |

| 6 October 2012 | Vale of Leithen | 5–1 | Selkirk | Victoria Park, Innerleithen |
| 14:30 | Stephen Sproule 12'; Danny Noon 50'; Scott Moffat 56', 83'; Kerr Dodds 81' | | 84' Johnny Watt | Referee: Craig Napier |

| 6 October 2012 | Nairn County | 3–2 | Clyde | Station Park, Nairn |
| 15:00 | Conor Gethins 22'; John Cameron 79'; Andrew Neill 89' | | 6' Stefan McCluskey; 41' (pen.) John Sweeney | Referee: Gavin Ross |

== Third round ==
Sixteen teams joined in the 3rd round: all ten current Second Division clubs, along with 6th to 8th in last season's First Division (Partick, Raith and Morton) and the three teams that were promoted from last season's Second Division (Cowdenbeath, Dumbarton and Airdrie United).

| 3 November 2012 | Rangers | 7–0 | Alloa Athletic | Ibrox Stadium, Glasgow |
| 15:00 | Dean Shiels 2', 21'; Lee McCulloch 33', 72'; Robbie Crawford 73'; Barrie McKay 82', 89' | | | Attendance: 25,478; Referee: Ian Brines |

| 3 November 2012 | Elgin City | 5–1 | East Fife | Borough Briggs, Elgin |
| 15:00 | Stuart Leslie 27'; Craig Gunn 32'; Daniel Moore 55' (pen.); Mark Nicolson 67'; Paul Harkins 73' | | 78' David Muir | Attendance: 748; Referee: Kevin Graham |

| 3 November 2012 | Buckie Thistle | 0–1 | Turriff United | Victoria Park, Buckie |
| 15:00 | | | 14' Gary Harris | Attendance: 800; Referee: Gavin Ross |

| 3 November 2012 | Dumbarton | 4–1 | East Stirlingshire | Dumbarton Football Stadium, Dumbarton |
| 15:00 | Andy Graham 13'; Jim Lister 45'; Bryan Prunty 76'; Alan Lithgow 89' | | 44' David Greenhill | Attendance: 446; Referee: Craig Charleston |

| 3 November 2012 | Airdrie United | 2–2 | Raith Rovers | Excelsior Stadium, Airdrie |
| 15:00 | Gavin Griffin 28'; Jason Thomson 78' (o.g.) | | 13' Simon Mensing; 90' Greig Spence | Attendance: 854; Referee: Stephen Finnie |

| 3 November 2012 | Stranraer | 1–1 | Queens Park | Stair Park, Stranraer |
| 15:00 | Craig Malcolm 72' | | 52' David Anderson | Attendance: 344; Referee: Don Robertson |

| 3 November 2012 | Partick Thistle | 2–1 | Cove Rangers | Firhill Stadium, Glasgow |
| 15:00 | Ross Forbes 13'; Steven Craig 27' | | 86' Danny Milne | Attendance: 1,957; Referee: Mike Tumilty |

| 3 November 2012 | Forfar Athletic | 3–3 | Nairn County | Station Park, Forfar |
| 15:00 | Chris Templeman 11'; Gavin Swankie 26'; Stephen Tulloch 39' | | 57' Martin MacDonald; 72' Ross Naismith; 90' Craig MacMillan | Referee: Euan Anderson |

| 3 November 2012 | Albion Rovers | 1–1 | Greenock Morton | Cliftonhill, Coatbridge |
| 15:00 | Tony Stevenson 45' | | 58' Peter Weatherson | Attendance: 656; Referee: Crawford Allan |

| 3 November 2012 | Cowdenbeath | 8–1 | Vale of Leithen | Central Park, Cowdenbeath |
| 14:00 | Greg Stewart 25', 31', 41'; Lewis Coult 47', 51'; Marc McKenzie 49'; Mark Ramsay 64'; Jamie Stevenson 78' | | 2' Scott Moffat | Attendance: 309; Referee: George Salmond |

| 3 November 2012 | Edinburgh City | 0–2 | Queen of the South | Meadowbank Stadium, Edinburgh |
| 15:00 | | | 42' Nicky Clark; 65' Gavin Reilly | Attendance: 1,038; Referee: Matt Northcroft |

| 3 November 2012 | Stirling Albion | 0–1 | Deveronvale | Forthbank Stadium, Stirling |
| 15:00 | | | 57' Craig Cowie | Attendance: 688; Referee: Barry Cook |

| 3 November 2012 | Inverurie Loco Works | 3–3 | Arbroath | Harlaw Park, Inverurie |
| 15:00 | Clark Bain 67'; Neil Gauld 86', 90' | | 5' (pen.) Steven Doris; 23' Paul Currie; 58' Darren Gribben | Attendance: 732; Referee: Greg Aitken |

| 3 November 2012 | Ayr United | 2–1 | Clachnacuddin | Somerset Park, Ayr |
| 15:00 | Michael Moffat 50', 60' (pen.) | | 14' Scott Graham | Attendance: 1,032; Referee: David Somers |

| 3 November 2012 | Stenhousemuir | 1–1 | Berwick Rangers | Ochilview Park, Stenhousemuir |
| 15:00 | Stewart Kean 78' | | 32' Lee Currie | Attendance: 439; Referee: Paul Robertson |

| 3 November 2012 | Brechin City | 2–2 | Bonnyrigg Rose Athletic | Glebe Park, Brechin |
| 15:00 | Andy Jackson 61'; David Dunn 78' (o.g.) | | 21' Sean Grady; 58' Kris Renton | Attendance: 602; Referee: Andrew Dallas |

=== Third round Replays ===
| 10 November 2012 | Bonnyrigg Rose Athletic | 0–6 | Brechin City | New Dundas Park, Bonnyrigg |
| 13:30 | | | 11', 53' Kurtis Byrne; 16' Jonathan Brown; 19', 33' Alan Trouten; 71' Derek Carcary | Attendance: 1,082; Referee: Andrew Dallas |

| 10 November 2012 | Queens Park | 0–4 | Stranraer | Hampden Park, Glasgow |
| 15:00 | | | 16', 63', 77' Sean Winter; 70' Chris Aitken | Attendance: 551; Referee: Don Robertson |

| 10 November 2012 | Nairn County | 2–3 | Forfar Athletic | Station Park, Nairn |
| 15:00 | Conor Gethins 79'; John Cameron 88' | | 41', 58' Ross Campbell; 54' Gavin Swankie | Attendance: 578; Referee: Euan Anderson |

| 10 November 2012 | Arbroath | 3–1 | Inverurie Loco Works | Gayfield Park, Arbroath |
| 15:00 | Brian Kerr 36'; Derek Holmes 38'; Steven Doris 47' | | 90' Neil Gauld | Attendance: 1,108; Referee: Greg Aitken |

| 13 November 2012 | Greenock Morton | 3–0 | Albion Rovers | Cappielow Park, Greenock |
| 19:30 | Martin Hardie 51'; Michael Tidser 53', 73' | | | Attendance: 746; Referee: Crawford Allan |

| 13 November 2012 | Berwick Rangers | 2–5 | Stenhousemuir | Shielfield Park, Berwick-upon-Tweed |
| 19:45 | Lee Currie 11' (pen.); Darren Lavery 66'; Lee Currie (yellow card) 87' (red card) | | Darren Smith 39', 86'; John Gemmell 48'; Stewart Kean 52', 56' | Attendance: 402; Referee: Paul Robertson |

| 13 November 2012 | Raith Rovers | 4–3 (a.e.t.) | Airdrie United | Starks Park, Kirkcaldy |
| 19:45 | Greig Spence 5'; Allan Walker 21' (pen.); Grant Anderson 55'; Douglas Hill 99' | | Joshua Watt 3'; Paul Di Giacomo 45' (pen.); Gregor Buchanan 86' | Attendance: 935; Referee: Stephen Finnie |

== Fourth round ==
The Fourth round draw was conducted on 5 November 2012 at 2:30pm at Hampden Park live on Sky Sports News.

The 16 winners from the third round entered here, along with the 12 SPL clubs and four SFL First Division clubs who were exempt from playing in the third round (Dunfermline Athletic, Falkirk, Hamilton Academical, Livingston).

| 1 December 2012 | Ross County | 3–3 | Inverness CT | Victoria Park, Dingwall |
| 12:15 | Rocco Quinn 49'; Iain Vigurs 86'; Richard Brittain 90+3' | | Billy McKay 30'; Richie Foran 74'; Philip Roberts 90+5' | Attendance: 5,077; Referee: Craig Thomson |

| 1 December 2012 | Aberdeen | 1–1 | Motherwell | Pittodrie Stadium, Aberdeen |
| 15:00 | Niall McGinn 90' | | Jamie Murphy 80' | Attendance: 6,061; Referee: William Collum |

| 1 December 2012 | Partick Thistle | 0–1 | Dunfermline Athletic | Firhill Stadium, Glasgow |
| 15:00 | Aaron Muirhead (red card) 28' | | Andrew Barrowman 35'; Andrew Barrowman (yellow card) 90+1' (red card) | Attendance: 3,197; Referee: Steven McLean |

| 1 December 2012 | Kilmarnock | 2–1 | Queen of the South | Rugby Park, Kilmarnock |
| 15:00 | Cillian Sheridan 8'; Borja Perez 69' | | Stephen McKenna (red card) 2'; Nicholas Clark 77' | Attendance: 4,295; Referee: Mike Tumilty |

| 1 December 2012 | Raith Rovers | 2–1 | Deveronvale | Stark's Park, Kirkcaldy |
| 15:00 | Brian Graham 55', 89'; Douglas Hill (red card) 57' | | Scott Fraser 58' (pen.) | Attendance: 1,439; Referee: Paul Robertson |

| 1 December 2012 | Turriff United | 1–1 | Greenock Morton | The Haughs, Turriff |
| 15:00 | Mark Simpson 40'; Cammy Bowden (red card) 89' | | Peter Weatherson 45'; Craig Reid (red card) 88' | Attendance: 846; Referee: Gary Hilland |

| 1 December 2012 | Livingston | 0–2 | Dundee | Almondvale Stadium, Livingston |
| 15:00 | | | Steven Milne 9'; Ryan Conroy 17' (pen.) | Attendance: 1,432; Referee: Crawford Allan |

| 1 December 2012 | Forfar Athletic | 2–1 | Ayr United | Station Park, Forfar |
| 15:00 | Willie Robertson 59'; Charles King 74' | | David Sinclair 16' | Attendance: 698; Referee: George Salmond |

| 1 December 2012 | Celtic | 1–1 | Arbroath | Celtic Park, Glasgow |
| 15:00 | Alex Keddie 36' (o.g.) | | Steven Doris 87' | Attendance: 15,000; Referee: Craig Charleston |

| 1 December 2012 | Stranraer | 0–5 | Dundee United | Stair Park, Stranraer |
| 15:00 | | | Johnny Russell 13', 27', 69'; Jon Daly 40', 61' | Attendance: 1,220; Referee: Stephen Finnie |

| 1 December 2012 | Stenhousemuir | 0–1 | Falkirk | Ochilview Park, Stenhousemuir |
| 15:00 | | | Kieran Duffie 9' | Attendance: 1,758; Referee: Mat Northcroft |

| 1 December 2012 | St Mirren | 2–0 | Brechin City | St Mirren Park, Paisley |
| 15:00 | Kenny McLean 32'; Jon Robertson 42' | | | Attendance: 2,363; Referee: John McKendrick |

| 2 December 2012 | Rangers | 3–0 | Elgin City | Ibrox Stadium, Glasgow |
| 13:15 | Dean Shiels 43'; Kevin Kyle 68'; Kal Naismith 85' | | | Attendance: 23,195; Referee: Euan Norris |

| 2 December 2012 | Hibernian | 1–0 | Heart of Midlothian | Easter Road, Edinburgh |
| 15:30 | Zaliukas 84' (o.g.) | | | Attendance: 17,052; Referee: Calum Murray |

| 17 December 2012 | Dumbarton | 1–3 | Hamilton Academical | Dumbarton Football Stadium, Dumbarton |
| 19:30 | Chris Turner 58'; Chris Turner (yellow card) 78' (red card) | | Alister Crawford 24'; Michael Devlin 41'; Grant Gillespie 75' | Attendance: 469; Referee: Bobby Madden |

| 17 December 2012 | Cowdenbeath | 0–3 | St Johnstone | Central Park, Cowdenbeath |
| 19:45 | | | David McCracken 53'; Steven MacLean 76' (pen.); Gregory Tade 87' | Attendance: 809; Referee: John Beaton |

=== Fourth round Replays ===
| 11 December 2012 | Motherwell | 1–2 | Aberdeen | Fir Park, Motherwell |
| 19:45 | Michael Higdon 90+2' (pen.) | | Rory Fallon 51'; Joe Shaughnessy 61' | Attendance: 4,516; Referee: William Collum |

| 11 December 2012 | Inverness CT | 2–1 | Ross County | Caledonian Stadium, Inverness |
| 19:45 | Billy McKay 9' (pen.), 54' | | Iain Vigurs 41' | Attendance: 4,135; Referee: Craig Thomson |

| 12 December 2012 | Arbroath | 0–1 | Celtic | Gayfield Park, Arbroath |
| 19:45 | | | Adam Matthews 18' | Attendance: 4,127; Referee: Craig Charleston |

| 17 December 2012 | Greenock Morton | 6–0 | Turriff United | Cappielow Park, Greenock |
| 19:30 | Peter Weatherson 37', 82', 84'; Michael Tidser 45' (pen.), 63'; Peter MacDonald 77' | | | Attendance: 915; Referee: Gary Hilland |

== Fifth round ==
The Fifth round draw was conducted on 3 December 2012 at 1:00pm at Hampden Park live on Sky Sports News.

| 2 February 2013 | Dundee United | 3–0 | Rangers | Tannadice Park, Dundee |
| 12:45 | Johnny Russell 1', 79'; Jon Daly 36' | | | Attendance: 9,564; Referee: Euan Norris |

| 2 February 2013 | St Mirren | 2–0 | St Johnstone | St Mirren Park, Paisley |
| 15:00 | Esmaël Gonçalves 49', 56' | | | Attendance: 3,507; Referee: Craig Thomson |

| 2 February 2013 | Dunfermline Athletic | 0–2 | Hamilton Academical | East End Park, Dunfermline |
| 15:00 | | | Stevie May 51'; Jon Routledge 61' | Attendance: 2,588; Referee: John Beaton |

| 2 February 2013 | Falkirk | 4–1 | Forfar Athletic | Falkirk Stadium, Falkirk |
| 15:00 | Lyle Taylor 19', 83'; Stewart Murdoch 68'; David Weatherston 75' | | Iain Campbell 21' (pen.) | Attendance: 1,967; Referee: Kevin Clancy |

| 2 February 2013 | Kilmarnock | 2–0 | Inverness CT | Rugby Park, Kilmarnock |
| 15:00 | Paul Heffernan 58', 85' | | | Attendance: 3,172; Referee: Willie Collum |

| 3 February 2013 | Raith Rovers | 0–3 | Celtic | Stark's Park, Kirkcaldy |
| 12:45 | | | Kris Commons 56' (pen.); James Forrest 83'; Charlie Mulgrew 86' | Attendance: 7,775; Referee: Steven McLean |

| 3 February 2013 | Dundee | 5–1 | Greenock Morton | Dens Park, Dundee |
| 15:00 | Jim McAlister 29'; Lewis Toshney 65'; Colin Nish 71'; John Baird 74'; Declan Gallagher 82' | | Michael Tidser 31' | Attendance: 3,336; Referee: Bobby Madden |

| 3 February 2013 | Hibernian | 1–0 | Aberdeen | Easter Road, Edinburgh |
| 15:30 | Gary Deegan 49' | | | Attendance: 11,877; Referee: Iain Brines |

== Quarter-finals ==
The Quarter-finals draw was conducted on 3 February 2013 at 5:45pm at Easter Road Stadium live on Sky Sports 2.

| 2 March 2013 | St Mirren | 1–2 | Celtic | St Mirren Park, Paisley |
| 12:45 | Esmaël Gonçalves 13' | Report | Joe Ledley 5'; Anthony Stokes 21' | Attendance: 5,572; Referee: Alan Muir |

| 2 March 2013 | Hamilton Academical | 1–2 | Falkirk | New Douglas Park, Hamilton |
| 15:00 | Andy Ryan 74'; Jonathan Page (red card) 90+3' | Report | Blair Alston 44', 71' | Attendance: 3,452; Referee: William Collum |

| 3 March 2013 | Dundee | 1–2 | Dundee United | Dens Park, Dundee |
| 12:45 | Jim McAlister 19' | Report | Brian McLean 11'; Gary Mackay-Steven 35' | Attendance: 10,191; Referee: Iain Brines |

| 3 March 2013 | Kilmarnock | 2–4 | Hibernian | Rugby Park, Kilmarnock |
| 15:00 | James Dayton 26'; Paul Heffernan 72' (pen.); Ross Barbour (red card) 87' | Report | Leigh Griffiths 15', 82', 89' (pen.); Matt Done 39' | Attendance: 7,272; Referee: John Beaton |

== Semi-finals ==
The Semi-finals draw was conducted on 4 March 2013 at 1:30pm at Hampden Park live on Sky Sports News.

| 13 April 2013 | Hibernian | 4–3 (a.e.t.) | Falkirk | Hampden Park, Glasgow |
| 12:30 | Harris 51'; Griffiths 78', 115'; Doyle 83' | Report | Sibbald 6'; Fulton 18'; Aston 30' | Attendance: 22,410; Referee: Iain Brines (Injured after 90 mins); John Beaton (Extra time) |

| 14 April 2013 | Dundee United | 3–4 (a.e.t.) | Celtic | Hampden Park, Glasgow |
| 12:45 | Mackay−Steven 23'; Daly 30', 72' | Report | Commons 2', 59'; Wanyama 31'; Stokes 103' | Attendance: 24,828; Referee: Craig Thomson |

== Final ==
26 May 2013
15:00

| Hibernian | 0–3 | Celtic |
|---|---|---|
| | Report | Hooper 9', 31'; Ledley 80' |

Hampden Park, Glasgow
Attendance: 51,254
Referee: William Collum

== Awards ==
The Scottish Cup Player of the Round was decided by the fans, who cast their vote to choose a winner from a list of nominations on the official Scottish Cup Facebook page.

| Round | Player of the Round | Ref |
|---|---|---|
| R4 | Steven Doris (Arbroath) | |
| R5 | Esmaël Gonçalves (St Mirren) | |
| R6 | Leigh Griffiths (Hibernian) | |
| QF | Alex Harris (Hibernian) | |
| SF | Anthony Stokes (Celtic) | |

== Media coverage ==
From round four onwards, selected matches from the Scottish Cup are broadcast live in Ireland and the UK by BBC Scotland and Sky Sports. BBC Scotland has the option to show one tie per round with Sky Sports showing two ties per round with one replay also. Both channels will screen the final live.

These matches were broadcast live on television.

| Round | Sky Sports | BBC Scotland |
|---|---|---|
| Fourth round | Rangers vs Elgin City; Hibernian vs Heart of Midlothian; Arbroath vs Celtic (replay) | Ross County vs Inverness CT |
| Fifth round | Dundee United vs Rangers; Hibernian vs Aberdeen | Raith Rovers vs Celtic |
| Quarter-finals | St Mirren vs Celtic; Dundee vs Dundee United | Kilmarnock vs Hibernian |
| Semi-finals | Hibernian vs Falkirk; Dundee United vs Celtic | Hibernian vs Falkirk |
| Final | Hibernian vs Celtic | Hibernian vs Celtic |
