= Aberdeenshire and District Football Association =

Founded in April 1887, the Aberdeenshire and District Football Association is an affiliated local association of the Scottish Football Association. Member clubs were traditionally drawn from the historic counties of Aberdeenshire, Banffshire and Kincardineshire, however Elgin City from Moray joined in 2024, having left the North of Scotland Football Association.

== Competitions ==
The association organises the annual Aberdeenshire Cup, Aberdeenshire Shield and Aberdeenshire League competitions.

== Member clubs ==
=== Scottish Professional Football League ===
- Aberdeen
- Cove Rangers
- Elgin City
- Peterhead

=== Highland Football League ===
- Banks o' Dee
- Buckie Thistle
- Deveronvale
- Formartine United
- Fraserburgh
- Huntly
- Inverurie Loco Works
- Keith
- Turriff United

=== SJFA North Region ===
- Aberdeen University
- Dyce
- Hermes
- Stonehaven
