= 2014–15 Highland Football League =

Press & Journal Highland League
- Season: 2014–15
- Champions: Brora Rangers
- Matches: 306
- Goals: 1,285 (4.2 per match)
- Biggest home win: Brora Rangers 8–0 Turriff United
- Biggest away win: Rothes 0–9 Nairn County
- Highest scoring: Formartine United 6–5 Buckie Thistle; Lossiemouth 5–6 Fraserburgh; Strathspey Thistle 2–9 Wick Academy
- Longest winning run: 13 – Brora Rangers
- Longest unbeaten run: 34 (full season) – Brora Rangers
- Longest winless run: 20 – Strathspey Thistle
- Longest losing run: 10 – Keith; 10 – Strathspey Thistle

The 2014–15 Highland Football League kicked off on 2 August 2014. Due to the introduction of end-of-season promotion playoffs, all matches affecting the title or involving the champions had to be completed on or before 18 April 2015, though other matches could still take place after this date. The last match of the season was played on 9 May 2015.

Defending champions Brora Rangers secured their second consecutive league title on 28 March 2015 with a 2–1 win over closest rivals Turriff United F.C. at The Haughs and went on to finish the season without losing a match, the first club to do so since Caledonian in 1982–83. They also achieved new Highland League records for both the most goals scored (134) and fewest conceded (13), having kept a clean sheet in 23 of their 34 matches.

Starting in this season, the league champions playoff with the Lowland Football League champions (or other eligible team from outside the SPFL to be nominated by the Scottish FA), with the winner then playing the team finishing 10th and bottom in Scottish League Two in a promotion and relegation playoff to determine the entrants for the 2015–16 League Two season. In the playoffs, Brora Rangers narrowly beat Lowland League champions Edinburgh City but lost the final playoff against League Two club Montrose, and will therefore remain in an unchanged Highland League roster for the 2015–16 season.

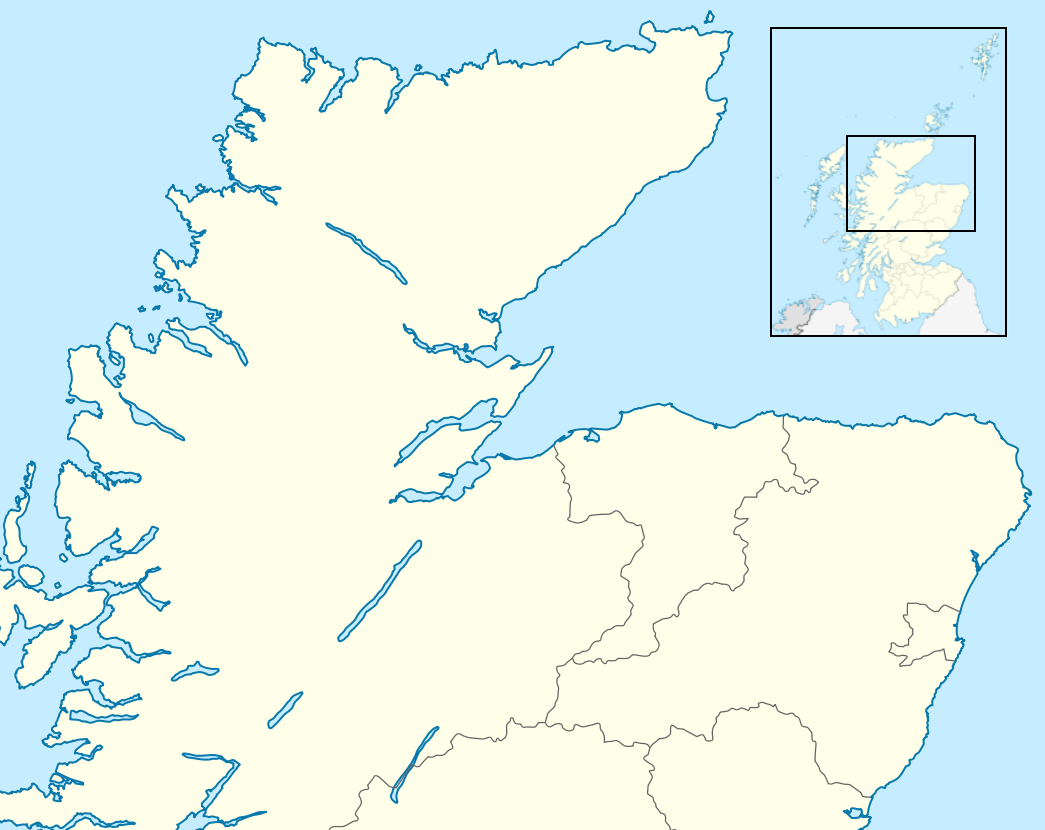
Location of teams in 2014–15 Highland Football League

== League table ==
Pos	Team	Pld	W	D	L	GF	GA	GD	Pts	Promotion or qualification
1	Brora Rangers (C)	34	30	4	0	134	13	+121	94	Qualification to League Two play-off semi-finals
2	Turriff United	34	27	2	5	90	40	+50	83	
3	Cove Rangers	34	22	7	5	103	40	+63	73	
4	Wick Academy	34	23	3	8	94	43	+51	72	
5	Fraserburgh	34	19	8	7	91	48	+43	65	
6	Formartine United	34	19	7	8	85	59	+26	64	
7	Inverurie Loco Works	34	20	3	11	93	51	+42	63	
8	Nairn County	34	18	3	13	88	43	+45	57	
9	Forres Mechanics	34	18	3	13	71	59	+12	57	
10	Buckie Thistle	34	15	5	14	71	66	+5	50	
11	Clachnacuddin	34	14	3	17	63	74	−11	45	
12	Deveronvale	34	9	9	16	53	82	−29	36	
13	Fort William	34	8	3	23	52	98	−46	27	
14	Keith	34	7	3	24	42	97	−55	24	
15	Lossiemouth	34	7	2	25	50	105	−55	23	
16	Huntly	34	5	5	24	37	100	−63	20	
17	Strathspey Thistle	34	3	5	26	36	125	−89	14	
18	Rothes	34	2	5	27	32	142	−110	11	

Source: Highland Football League
Rules for classification: 1) Points; 2) Goal difference; 3) Number of goals scored
(C) Champions

== Results ==
Home \ Away	BROR	BUCK	CLAC	COVE	DEVE	FORM	FORR	FORT	FRAS	HUNT	LOCO	KEITH	LOSS	NAIRN	ROTH	STRA	TURR	WICK
Brora Rangers		5–1	2–0	1–1	7–0	1–1	3–0	6–0	1–1	6–0	1–0	2–0	7–0	3–0	6–0	4–0	8–0	2–1
Buckie Thistle	1–4		4–1	1–5	1–1	2–3	2–0	1–2	2–2	2–0	0–2	4–0	2–4	2–0	1–0	2–2	0–3	1–3
Clachnacuddin	0–5	1–6		1–1	1–1	0–3	1–0	1–2	1–2	3–2	1–0	4–2	5–1	0–2	3–0	2–0	2–0	0–2
Cove Rangers	1–1	3–1	6–0		3–0	2–3	3–1	4–0	2–2	4–1	3–2	3–0	6–0	3–2	2–0	4–0	3–4	1–3
Deveronvale	0–5	0–4	3–3	0–6		2–2	0–2	2–0	1–0	0–0	0–2	5–3	4–1	1–7	3–1	6–3	1–2	0–1
Formartine United	0–5	6–5	4–2	3–0	2–2		0–2	3–1	1–1	2–3	2–3	7–1	4–2	4–3	4–1	4–2	1–2	0–2
Forres Mechanics	0–4	5–0	5–2	2–2	2–1	1–1		4–1	1–1	6–0	2–1	3–4	3–2	0–3	6–2	2–1	0–2	1–3
Fort William	2–6	1–2	2–3	1–4	4–3	1–2	0–3		2–3	3–3	0–6	2–0	4–3	1–3	4–4	1–2	1–5	3–2
Fraserburgh	2–3	2–2	4–2	1–3	6–1	3–0	1–2	3–0		4–2	1–3	4–1	1–0	2–1	7–0	5–4	2–1	2–2
Huntly	0–8	1–0	1–2	1–4	2–3	0–6	1–2	0–4	0–4		2–3	1–1	2–5	1–3	5–2	2–0	0–1	0–2
Inverurie Loco Works	0–5	1–2	2–0	4–5	2–4	2–3	4–1	3–0	0–0	2–0		3–0	3–1	1–1	3–2	3–2	1–3	2–3
Keith	0–3	2–5	2–3	0–4	0–0	0–1	1–3	1–0	0–4	3–2	1–3		1–0	1–3	5–1	2–3	2–7	2–3
Lossiemouth	1–5	1–2	1–4	0–2	1–1	2–2	1–2	2–1	5–6	0–2	0–7	1–3		2–1	2–0	2–1	1–5	0–2
Nairn County	0–3	1–2	3–1	1–1	4–0	0–1	1–2	4–0	1–2	5–0	2–3	6–1	5–2		7–1	3–0	4–0	0–0
Rothes	0–2	1–3	0–6	0–5	1–1	2–2	5–2	0–4	0–8	2–2	0–7	0–2	3–2	0–9		1–1	1–4	0–7
Strathspey Thistle	0–7	0–6	1–6	1–6	0–5	1–5	0–3	3–3	0–3	1–1	0–8	0–0	2–5	1–2	3–1		0–4	2–9
Turriff United	1–2	2–2	2–0	2–0	1–0	2–1	2–0	4–2	1–0	3–0	1–1	3–1	3–0	2–0	7–0	5–0		2–1
Wick Academy	0–1	2–0	3–2	1–1	3–2	1–2	4–3	3–0	3–2	4–0	3–6	4–0	4–0	0–1	7–1	3–0	3–4	

Updated to match(es) played on unknown. Source: highlandfootballleague.com
Legend: Blue = home team win; Yellow = draw; Red = away team win.

== Promotion play-off ==
As champions, Brora Rangers played off against the winners of the Lowland Football League, Edinburgh City over two legs. Brora won on penalties and went on to play off against the bottom-placed club in Scottish League Two, Montrose. Montrose won 3–2 on aggregate, therefore Brora Rangers remain in the Highland League for the 2015–16 season.
