= 2009–10 Highland Football League =

Scot-Ads Highland League
- Season: 2009–10
- Champions: Buckie Thistle
- Goals: 1,159
- Average goals/game: 3.79
- Top goalscorer: 30 – Barry Somers (Formartine United)
- Biggest home win: Clachnacuddin 8–0 Strathspey Thistle & Buckie Thistle 8–0 Fort William
- Biggest away win: Strathspey Thistle 0–9 Nairn County
- Highest scoring: Cove Rangers 7–3 Lossiemouth & Lossiemouth 8–2 Brora Rangers
- Longest winning run: 9 – Fraserburgh
- Longest unbeaten run: 18 – Buckie Thistle
- Longest losing run: 11 – Fort William & Rothes

The 2009–10 Highland Football League was competed for by 18 teams. This is three-up on the previous season after Formartine United, Strathspey Thistle and Turriff United were voted in. Buckie Thistle won the league on 1 May 2010 after a 3–0 win over Wick Academy. Strathspey Thistle, one of the new teams, finished bottom in their first season.

== Table ==
Pos	Team	Pld	W	D	L	GF	GA	GD	Pts
1	Buckie Thistle (C)	34	26	5	3	83	26	+57	83
2	Cove Rangers	34	23	6	5	97	42	+55	75
3	Deveronvale	34	21	5	8	91	47	+44	68
4	Fraserburgh	34	21	5	8	75	48	+27	68
5	Forres Mechanics	34	20	5	9	72	42	+30	65
6	Formartine United	34	18	6	10	75	47	+28	60
7	Huntly	34	19	3	12	66	49	+17	60
8	Keith	34	17	6	11	77	54	+23	57
9	Wick Academy	34	16	6	12	79	64	+15	54
10	Inverurie Loco Works	34	15	6	13	60	47	+13	51
11	Nairn County	34	15	5	14	61	59	+2	50
12	Clachnacuddin	34	12	7	15	73	73	0	43
13	Turriff United	34	9	4	21	60	86	−26	31
14	Lossiemouth	34	7	6	21	52	74	−22	27
15	Brora Rangers	34	6	6	22	32	81	−49	24
16	Rothes	34	7	3	24	39	102	−63	24
17	Fort William	34	6	2	26	37	98	−61	20
18	Strathspey Thistle	34	3	4	27	30	120	−90	13

Source: Highland Football League
Rules for classification: 1) points; 2) goal difference; 3) number of goals scored.
(C) Champions

== Results ==
Home \ Away	BRO	BUC	CLA	COV	DEV	FRM	FRR	FRT	FRA	HUN	LOC	KEI	LOS	NAI	ROT	STR	TUR	WIC
Brora Rangers		0–5	0–3	2–3	0–5	1–1	0–2	0–2	1–1	0–1	0–2	0–0	0–2	1–3	4–1	4–2	4–3	1–0
Buckie Thistle	1–0		5–1	2–1	1–2	3–2	3–2	8–0	1–1	1–1	1–0	3–1	1–0	1–0	5–0	6–1	3–0	1–0
Clachnacuddin	1–0	1–2		3–3	0–4	1–3	1–1	3–0	1–3	1–7	2–2	4–0	3–1	1–0	6–0	8–0	4–2	2–5
Cove Rangers	4–0	2–2	2–1		2–2	4–1	2–1	2–0	2–0	5–0	0–0	1–0	7–3	4–2	2–0	5–0	7–2	3–2
Deveronvale	6–2	1–2	2–2	3–0		3–0	3–0	6–0	1–2	1–2	0–1	2–1	3–1	4–1	4–0	3–2	3–1	3–4
Formartine United	2–1	0–1	3–0	0–2	1–2		2–2	3–0	1–4	2–2	3–1	1–1	5–0	1–3	2–0	5–0	4–2	3–1
Forres Mechanics	3–0	1–0	4–3	2–1	3–1	1–0		4–2	1–0	3–0	2–0	1–2	1–0	1–2	7–0	5–1	3–2	2–2
Fort William	0–1	3–5	1–3	2–3	2–2	1–4	0–2		2–3	0–2	3–2	2–4	1–0	0–1	1–1	2–1	1–4	1–3
Fraserburgh	4–0	0–0	4–4	1–1	2–3	4–2	4–3	6–2		2–1	0–4	5–0	3–1	3–1	2–1	4–2	2–0	1–4
Huntly	1–1	0–3	1–0	3–1	1–2	0–3	3–1	1–3	2–1		1–0	0–3	4–1	0–1	3–2	5–0	3–2	3–2
Inverurie Loco Works	3–1	3–2	4–3	0–4	3–1	0–4	1–1	2–0	1–2	2–0		1–1	3–0	0–0	1–3	2–0	2–2	0–1
Keith	4–0	0–2	3–0	1–1	0–1	0–3	2–2	5–0	0–1	2–1	3–1		1–0	3–1	6–2	6–1	2–3	5–2
Lossiemouth	8–2	1–2	0–0	3–2	3–4	2–2	2–0	5–1	1–3	0–3	1–2	2–2		2–4	2–0	2–2	1–2	1–2
Nairn County	1–1	1–1	3–2	1–5	3–3	2–3	1–2	3–2	0–1	1–0	3–2	1–3	3–1		3–2	3–0	1–2	0–4
Rothes	0–3	0–2	0–3	1–8	2–2	0–3	0–1	1–0	3–0	0–7	1–4	2–5	1–1	2–0		2–1	2–1	6–1
Strathspey Thistle	1–1	0–2	2–3	0–3	0–5	0–2	0–5	4–1	2–0	2–3	0–3	0–3	0–2	0–9	2–1		0–0	2–2
Turriff United	4–0	1–3	1–1	2–3	2–1	1–2	0–2	1–2	0–3	1–2	0–7	4–5	3–1	2–3	3–2	5–1		1–1
Wick Academy	2–1	0–3	5–2	0–2	1–3	2–2	2–1	3–0	0–3	0–3	2–1	4–3	2–2	0–0	7–1	8–1	5–1	

Source: Highland Football League
Legend: Blue = home team win; Yellow = draw; Red = away team win.
