= 2004–05 Highland Football League =

Highland League
- Season: 2004–05
- Champions: Huntly
- Goals: 800
- Average goals/game: 3.81
- Biggest home win: Inverurie Loco Works 13–1 Fort William
- Biggest away win: Brora Rangers 1–7 Keith
- Highest scoring: Inverurie Loco Works 13–1 Fort William

The 2004–05 Highland Football League was won by Huntly. Brora Rangers finished bottom.

== Table ==
Pos	Team	Pld	W	D	L	GF	GA	GD	Pts
1	Huntly (C)	28	20	5	3	79	32	+47	65
2	Inverurie Loco Works	28	20	3	5	81	25	+56	63
3	Fraserburgh	28	19	2	7	75	35	+40	59
4	Deveronvale	28	19	2	7	75	40	+35	59
5	Buckie Thistle	28	16	4	8	51	26	+25	52
6	Cove Rangers	28	16	4	8	59	44	+15	52
7	Clachnacuddin	28	14	3	11	60	37	+23	45
8	Keith	28	14	3	11	56	45	+11	45
9	Forres Mechanics	28	10	9	9	49	44	+5	39
10	Nairn County	28	11	3	14	54	58	−4	36
11	Lossiemouth	28	10	1	17	49	80	−31	31
12	Wick Academy	28	6	1	21	30	71	−41	19
13	Fort William	28	5	1	22	26	89	−63	16
14	Rothes	28	4	2	22	30	78	−48	14
15	Brora Rangers	28	2	5	21	26	96	−70	11

Source: Highland Football League
Rules for classification: 1) points; 2) goal difference; 3) number of goals scored.
(C) Champions

== Results ==
Home \ Away	BRO	BUC	CLA	COV	DEV	FRR	FRT	FRA	HUN	LOC	KEI	LOS	NAI	ROT	WIC
Brora Rangers		0–4	0–0	2–3	3–6	0–3	1–1	0–4	0–3	1–6	1–7	2–2	1–4	1–2	0–2
Buckie Thistle	1–2		1–0	2–1	0–1	5–0	0–1	3–1	0–2	2–1	5–0	1–0	1–1	3–0	0–2
Clachnacuddin	3–0	0–3		2–2	2–1	7–1	5–0	0–1	2–2	0–3	0–2	2–0	2–0	3–1	5–1
Cove Rangers	4–0	3–1	0–3		2–2	1–1	3–1	0–2	1–4	0–3	2–0	3–1	4–1	2–0	5–1
Deveronvale	6–0	0–2	2–1	2–4		2–1	3–2	5–2	1–1	2–0	2–0	5–0	3–1	3–1	3–2
Forres Mechanics	2–2	0–0	0–2	1–1	0–4		2–0	0–1	2–2	0–1	0–0	5–2	1–1	3–0	5–0
Fort William	4–2	0–4	0–2	1–2	0–5	0–1		0–6	2–4	0–2	0–3	0–1	3–2	1–6	2–0
Fraserburgh	5–1	3–0	0–3	6–0	0–1	4–1	3–1		3–1	1–0	0–0	5–0	6–2	5–2	3–0
Huntly	5–0	2–2	3–2	0–2	1–0	4–1	8–1	2–2		1–3	4–1	5–0	3–0	1–0	2–1
Inverurie Loco Works	1–1	1–1	2–1	2–1	4–0	1–1	13–1	3–1	1–3		2–0	8–1	4–2	7–1	3–0
Keith	3–1	3–1	2–0	2–6	3–2	0–2	4–2	3–0	3–5	0–1		0–3	2–2	5–0	2–1
Lossiemouth	6–3	1–2	3–6	3–2	3–2	0–4	3–1	2–5	1–2	1–3	0–4		0–1	4–1	3–0
Nairn County	5–0	0–3	2–5	1–2	2–3	0–5	3–1	3–1	0–2	2–1	2–0	5–3		4–0	6–0
Rothes	3–0	0–1	2–1	0–2	2–5	2–2	0–1	1–3	0–4	0–3	1–4	1–3	1–2		1–1
Wick Academy	1–2	1–3	3–1	0–1	1–4	2–5	1–0	1–2	1–3	1–2	0–3	2–3	1–0	4–2	

Source: Highland Football League
Legend: Blue = home team win; Yellow = draw; Red = away team win.
