= 2005–06 Highland Football League =

Scot-Ads Highland League
- Season: 2005–06
- Champions: Deveronvale
- Goals: 816
- Average goals/game: 3.89
- Biggest home win: Inverurie Loco Works 8–0 Lossiemouth
- Biggest away win: Fort William 0–9 Forres Mechanics
- Highest scoring: Fort William 1–9 Huntly

The 2005–06 Highland Football League was won by Deveronvale. Fort William finished bottom.

== Table ==
Pos	Team	Pld	W	D	L	GF	GA	GD	Pts
1	Deveronvale (C)	28	20	4	4	77	29	+48	64
2	Inverurie Loco Works	28	19	3	6	72	26	+46	60
3	Buckie Thistle	28	16	8	4	48	23	+25	56
4	Forres Mechanics	28	17	3	8	76	37	+39	54
5	Keith	28	16	4	8	63	41	+22	52
6	Huntly	28	15	6	7	66	41	+25	51
7	Fraserburgh	28	13	6	9	68	45	+23	45
8	Cove Rangers	28	12	6	10	55	46	+9	42
9	Clachnacuddin	28	12	5	11	56	57	−1	41
10	Nairn County	28	12	4	12	57	46	+11	40
11	Rothes	28	9	1	18	48	75	−27	28
12	Wick Academy	28	7	4	17	41	67	−26	25
13	Lossiemouth	28	7	4	17	40	97	−57	25
14	Brora Rangers	28	4	1	23	31	82	−51	13
15	Fort William	28	1	1	26	18	104	−86	4

Source: Highland Football League
Rules for classification: 1) points; 2) goal difference; 3) number of goals scored.
(C) Champions

== Results ==
Home \ Away	BRO	BUC	CLA	COV	DEV	FRR	FRT	FRA	HUN	LOC	KEI	LOS	NAI	ROT	WIC
Brora Rangers		1–2	1–4	2–3	0–3	1–6	2–0	0–3	1–4	1–4	0–4	2–5	1–2	0–1	1–2
Buckie Thistle	2–0		2–1	1–0	2–2	1–1	2–1	1–1	0–0	0–3	2–1	7–0	1–0	1–1	5–0
Clachnacuddin	2–1	1–2		3–3	3–2	1–0	6–0	2–2	3–1	1–2	4–2	5–1	1–3	3–1	3–3
Cove Rangers	5–1	1–1	2–1		1–1	2–0	2–0	3–2	1–3	1–0	0–0	6–0	2–2	4–3	5–0
Deveronvale	3–3	3–1	2–0	2–0		3–1	6–0	2–1	4–1	3–1	1–2	4–0	2–1	8–1	5–0
Forres Mechanics	3–1	0–1	4–1	2–1	1–1		5–1	2–0	4–1	1–2	4–1	8–1	3–1	2–1	2–1
Fort William	0–1	1–5	0–1	3–2	0–1	0–9		0–5	1–9	0–2	0–4	2–2	1–3	1–3	1–3
Fraserburgh	4–2	1–0	7–0	4–0	0–1	3–1	7–2		1–1	2–2	3–3	2–4	4–0	5–1	4–0
Huntly	1–3	2–0	2–2	2–2	3–1	2–2	4–0	0–2		0–2	3–2	2–1	1–1	2–0	2–0
Inverurie Loco Works	3–0	0–0	4–0	4–1	1–2	3–4	2–0	3–0	1–4		2–1	8–0	3–0	0–1	3–1
Keith	5–0	0–0	2–1	3–2	2–0	1–0	2–0	1–2	2–1	1–4		4–3	2–2	4–1	1–0
Lossiemouth	2–0	0–4	2–3	0–2	0–6	1–3	3–2	1–1	1–5	0–4	1–6		1–0	4–3	3–3
Nairn County	0–2	0–1	4–1	3–0	2–5	1–2	5–1	6–0	1–4	2–2	2–0	3–0		5–1	5–2
Rothes	4–1	1–2	2–3	3–2	2–3	4–2	1–0	5–1	2–4	0–4	2–5	0–2	2–1		0–2
Wick Academy	5–3	1–2	0–0	0–2	0–1	0–4	7–1	2–1	1–2	0–3	1–2	2–2	1–2	4–2	

Source: Highland Football League
Legend: Blue = home team win; Yellow = draw; Red = away team win.
