= Banff F.C. =

Association football club in Scotland

Banff
- Founded: 1919
- Dissolved: 1933
- Ground: Princess Royal Park
- President: W. Runcie
- Trainer: James Whyte
colours

Banff Football Club was an association football club from the county town of Banffshire.

== History ==
The club was founded in 1919, and was the third club with the name. At the start of the 1921–22 season, the club merged with the Macduff club to form Banff-Macduff United, with the club's President (Baillie Bisset) representing Macduff, the secretary (M'Gregor) representing Banff, and a management committee of 12 members from each club.

However the club was suspended from the Scottish Football Association at the start of the 1922–23 season, which stopped it from playing in the Scottish Qualifying Cup, because it had not paid back wages owed to former coach Alan McRobbie (a former Aberdeen player). The clubs therefore de-merged before the season ended, Banff occasionally borrowing Macduff players for friendlies and the Banff-Macduff combine was formally struck from the Scottish FA roll for non-payment of subscription in August 1923.

Banff joined the Aberdeenshire and District League intermittently from 1921 to 1926, but finished bottom every season in which it competed; it only won 1 of its 29 matches.

As Banff, the club re-joined the Scottish FA in 1925, after the Scottish FA queried the availability of dressing rooms. It entered the Scottish Qualifying Cup from 1925 to 1932. Its lack of regular football counted against it, with a series of defeats in the first round. The only match in the competition it did not lose was in the first round in 1926–27; the club drew 0–0 at Princess Royal Park against Huntly and lost 2–1 in the replay, having taken the lead through Duncan after 25 minutes, but Huntly equalizing two minutes later, and winning the tie with an 89th-minute goal.

The club had a similar lack of success in the Aberdeenshire Cup, which it entered from its foundation until its demise; again it did not win a single tie. Its true level was in junior football, and it won the Wood Cup in 1931 for junior sides in the area. The club petered out in 1933, and a new club, Deveronvale, was founded in 1938 to represent the area.

== Colours ==
The club wore red jerseys, white knickers, and red socks. As Banff-Macduff the club wore blue.

== Ground ==
The club played at the Princess Royal Park, used by previous Banff sides.
