= Aberdeenshire Shield =

- Founded: 1990
- Region: Aberdeenshire (ADFA)
- Current champions: Fraserburgh
- Most championships: Fraserburgh (11 titles)

The Aberdeenshire Shield, like the Aberdeenshire Cup, is a competition for football clubs in and around Aberdeenshire.

The winners are awarded the Fleming Shield, which was originally awarded to the winners of the Fleming Charity Shield competition - last played in 1929. The competition was first held in 1990–91 Highland Football League season and the winners were Cove Rangers.

The Aberdeenshire Shield was originally a secondary competition for clubs in the region not in membership of the SFL and SPL, primarily clubs in the Highland League. However in recent years, teams such as Aberdeen, Peterhead, Banks O' Dee and Aberdeen University from the SPFL and North Region SJFA (now the North of Scotland League) have entered the competition. The final of the tournament is normally contested at a suitable neutral venue.

The current holders are Fraserburgh, who are also the most successful club overall, with eleven wins.

Season	Winner	Score	Runner-up
1990–91	Cove Rangers	1–0 (aet)	Fraserburgh
1991–92	Fraserburgh	_{(pens.)} 2–2 (aet)	Deveronvale
1992–93	Buckie Thistle	3–2	Huntly
1993–94	Fraserburgh	4–2	Keith
1994–95	Deveronvale	1–0	Cove Rangers
1995–96	Fraserburgh	2–1 (aet)	Peterhead
1996–97	Fraserburgh	6–3 (aet)	Peterhead
1997–98	Keith	3–2	Peterhead
1998–99	Peterhead	3–1	Keith
1999–00	Fraserburgh	2–1	Keith
2000–01	Cove Rangers	3–0	Buckie Thistle
2001–02	Keith	3–2	Fraserburgh
2002–03	Deveronvale	3–2	Inverurie Loco Works
2003–04	Inverurie Loco Works	4–1	Deveronvale
2004–05	Keith	3–1 (aet)	Inverurie Loco Works
2005–06	Keith	2–1	Inverurie Loco Works
2006–07	Keith	3–0	Fraserburgh
2007–08	Buckie Thistle	3–0	Inverurie Loco Works
2008–09	Cove Rangers	2–0	Banks O' Dee
2009–10	Peterhead	3–0	Inverurie Loco Works
2010–11	Turriff United	2–0	Aberdeen
2011–12	Fraserburgh	5–0	Banks O' Dee
2012–13	Turriff United	6–1	Cove Rangers
2013–14	Inverurie Loco Works	5–0	Turriff United
2014–15	Turriff United	4–3	Fraserburgh
2015–16	Fraserburgh	1–0	Cove Rangers
2016–17	Inverurie Loco Works	5–2	Banks O' Dee
2017–18	Cove Rangers	5–2	Banks O' Dee
2018–19	Formartine United	4–1	Banks O' Dee
2019–20	Fraserburgh	3–1	Inverurie Loco Works
2020–21	No Competition		
2021–22	Banks O' Dee	_{(pens.)} 3–3	Huntly
2022–23	Fraserburgh	2–1	Buckie Thistle
2023–24	Banks O' Dee	2–0	Aberdeen
2024–25	Fraserburgh	4–2	Formartine United
2025–26	Fraserburgh	3–1	Aberdeen

== List of winners ==
Club	Wins	Last win
Fraserburgh	11	2025–26
Keith	5	2006–07
Cove Rangers	4	2017–18
Inverurie Loco Works	3	2016–17
Turriff United	3	2014–15
Banks O' Dee	2	2023–24
Buckie Thistle	2	2007–08
Deveronvale	2	2002–03
Peterhead	2	2009–10
Formartine United	1	2018–19
