= Aberdeenshire and District League =

Aberdeenshire & District League
- Founded: 1919
- Country: Scotland
- Number of clubs: 9 (2024–25)
- Current champions: Inverurie Loco Works (2025–26)
- Most championships: Buckie Thistle (12)

The Aberdeenshire and District League, usually known as the Aberdeenshire League, is a football tournament for clubs in membership of the Aberdeenshire and District Football Association. The clubs are drawn from the historic counties of Aberdeenshire and Banffshire. Historically, clubs from Moray and Angus also competed.

The competition began in 1919 as the North Eastern League and renamed in 1921. It ran until the end of season 1952–53 when it was disbanded due to clubs' priorities being primarily on the Highland League.

The league was revived in 1994 as an Under-21 league. Currently, teams are allowed to field three over-age players in their match squad.

== League Champions ==
Season	Winner
1919–20	Aberdeen 'A'
1920–21	Aberdeen 'A'
1921–22	Montrose
1922–23	Fraserburgh
1923–24	Buckie Thistle
1924–25	Buckie Thistle
1925–26	Aberdeen 'A'
1926–27	Aberdeen 'A'
1927–28	Aberdeen 'A'
1928–29	Aberdeen 'A'
1929–30	Buckie Thistle
1930–31	Buckie Thistle
1931–32	Buckie Thistle
1932–33	Fraserburgh
1933–34	Fraserburgh
1934–35	Elgin City
1935–36	Keith
1936–37	not completed
1937–38	Fraserburgh
1938–39	Buckie Thistle
1939–45	Second World War
1945–46	Buckie Thistle
1946–47	Aberdeen University
1947–48	Aberdeen 'A'
1948–49	Peterhead
1949–50	Buckie Thistle
1950–51	Fraserburgh
1951–52	Buckie Thistle
1952–53	Buckie Thistle
1953–94	not contested
1994–95	Fraserburgh
1995–96	Fraserburgh
1996–97	Keith
1997–98	Fraserburgh
1998–99	Keith
1999–00	Keith
2000–01	Cove Rangers
2001–02	Keith
2002–03	Buckie Thistle
2003–04	Buckie Thistle
2004–05	Deveronvale
2005–06	Deveronvale
2006–07	Keith
2007–08	Peterhead
2008–09	Cove Rangers
2009–10	Deveronvale
2010–11	Cove Rangers
2011–12	Cove Rangers
2012–13	Cove Rangers
2013–14	Banks o' Dee
2014–15	Cove Rangers
2015–16	Formartine United
2016–17	Huntly
2017–18	Banks o' Dee
2018–19	Inverurie Loco Works
2019–20	Inverurie Loco Works
2020–21	No Competition
2021–22	Turriff United
2022–23	Fraserburgh
2023–24	Formartine United
2024–25	Fraserburgh
2025–26	Inverurie Loco Works

== Club Performance ==
As of after 2025–26

Club	Winners
Buckie Thistle	12
Fraserburgh	10
Aberdeen 'A'	7
Cove Rangers	6
Keith	6
Inverurie Loco Works	3
Deveronvale	3
Formartine United	2
Banks o' Dee	2
Peterhead	2
Turriff United	1
Huntly	1
Aberdeen University	1
Elgin City	1
Montrose	1
