= Turriff United F.C. =

Association football club in Scotland

Turriff United
- Full name: Turriff United Football Club
- Nicknames: Turra, United
- Founded: 1954; 72 years ago
- Ground: The Haughs, Turriff
- Capacity: 2,135 (135 seated)
- Coordinates: 57.5365°N 2.4672°W
- Chairman: Paddy Neville and Karen Watson
- Manager: Greg Moir
- League: Highland League
- 2025–26: Highland League, 10th of 18
Home colours	Away colours

Turriff United Football Club are a senior football club currently playing in the Highland League in Scotland. They play their matches at The Haughs, beside the River Deveron in Turriff, Aberdeenshire. They joined the Highland League for the 2009–10 season, having been accepted into the league on 25 February 2009. Prior to joining the Highland League, they were a Scottish Junior Football Association club, playing in the Scottish Junior Football North Premier League.

Turriff finished in the top half of the table only once in their first five seasons in the Highland League, but their fortunes improved significantly in the 2014–15 season. The club recovered from early-season setbacks (their heaviest-ever league defeat, 8–0 by defending champions Brora Rangers, followed by a three-point penalty for fielding an ineligible player in their opening match) to beat their previous record of 16 wins in a season with 14 matches still to play. Turriff went on to compile a 23-match unbeaten run, during which they briefly led the league table following a 1–0 win over Deveronvale on 3 January 2015, and again following a 3–0 victory over Huntly four weeks later. On both occasions the second-placed club, Brora Rangers, had two games in hand. Turriff remained Brora's closest rivals for the rest of the season, until Brora finally took the title with a 2–1 win over Turriff at The Haughs on 28 March. A week later, Turriff secured second place when a draw between their own closest rivals, Cove Rangers and Wick Academy, left both clubs unable to close the gap.

The club made its Scottish Cup debut in 2012, beating Burntisland Shipyard, Civil Service Strollers and Buckie Thistle to reach the fourth round, in which a 1–1 draw at home to Greenock Morton made them the last surviving non-SFL/SPL side in the competition, before being knocked out in the replay.
In 2013–14, Turriff reached the third round, beating Selkirk and Wick Academy before going out to Stirling Albion. In 2014–15 they beat Lossiemouth in the first round, before losing to Clyde in the second. By virtue of finishing as runners up in the Highland League, they entered the 2015–16 competition in the second round, before losing to Fraserburgh.

Changes to the entry criteria of the Scottish Challenge Cup allowed Turriff to take part for the first time in 2016–17. They reached the third round, losing to Hibernian. The game set a new home attendance record for the club (1,791). The game was broadcast on BBC Alba and was the first time a Highland League club had featured in a live TV game.

Turriff's most consistent success as a senior club has been in the Aberdeenshire Shield competition, which they have won three times. During the 2013–14 competition, their semi-final match against Cove Rangers was declared void and ordered to be replayed after it emerged that both teams had fielded ineligible players (in Turriff's case, the player was an unused substitute). The decision was to Turriff's advantage, as they had lost the original match – but went on to win the replay and so reach the final for the second year running.
Their success in 2015 against Cove Rangers in the semi-final made them finalists for three consecutive seasons.

The club's official mascot is Moo the Coo, an anthropomorphised male counterpart to the town's unofficial emblem, the Turra Coo.

== The Haughs ==
The Haughs
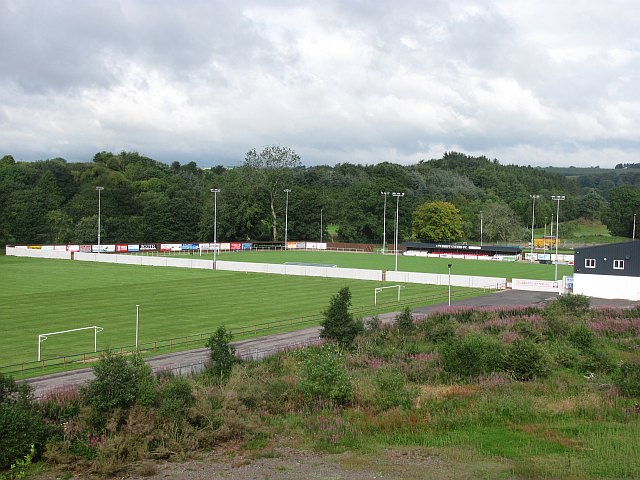
- Interactive map of The Haughs
- Full name: The Haughs
- Location: Turriff; Aberdeenshire, Scotland
- Owner: Turriff United F.C.
- Capacity: 2135 (135 seated)
- Surface: Grass
- Record attendance: 1791 v Hibernian; 4 September 2016
- Field size: 101 × 64 m

Construction
- Built: 1954
- Expanded: 2010

The Haughs (57°32′11″N 002°28′02″W) is the club's home ground and is located by the River Deveron near the centre of Turriff. The Haughs hosted the decisive match in the 2014–15 Highland Football League season, Brora Rangers being declared champions after beating Turriff, their closest rivals 2–1.

== Senior honours ==
- Highland League Cup: 2025–26
- Aberdeenshire Shield: 2010–11, 2012–13, 2014–15
- Aberdeenshire League: 2021–22

=== Junior honours ===
- North Region First Division (East) winners: 2002–03
- North Regional Cup winners: 2006–07
- North East League Cup winners: 1984–85
- McLeman Cup winners: 1985–86
- Grill League Cup winners: 2006–07
- Duthie Cup winners: 1987–88
- Aberdeen Cable TV Cup winners: 1988–89
- North Drybrough Cup winners: 1986–87
