= Christie Park, Huntly =

Football ground in Huntly, Scotland

Christie Park
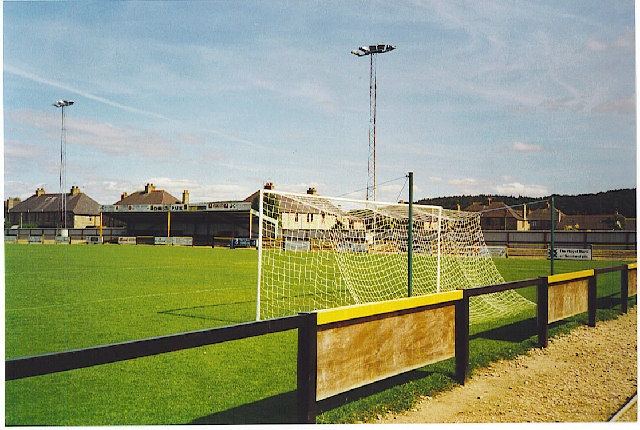

- Location in Aberdeenshire
- Former names: Strathbogie Park
- Location: East Park Street, Huntly, Aberdeenshire, Scotland
- Coordinates: 57°26′57″N 2°46′59″W
- Owner: Huntly F.C.
- Capacity: 2,200 (270 seated)
- Surface: grass
- Record attendance: 4,500 v Dundee United; 18 February 1995
- Field size: 105 x 72 yards

Construction
- Opened: 1921

Tenant
- Huntly F.C.

Christie Park is a football ground in the town of Huntly in the north-east of Scotland. It is the home ground of Highland Football League side Huntly F.C. It is located on East Park Street in the north-east of the town and has a capacity of 2,200 with 270 seated.

== History ==
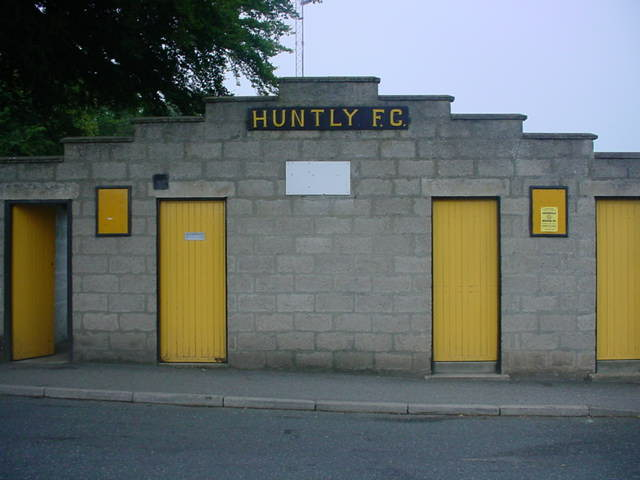
Outside Christie Park, Huntly (2006)

The ground was previously known as Strathbogie Park from 1921 when it opened, until 1926 when it was renamed Christie Park. The ground takes its name from former Provost Christie who acquired the ground and donated it to the football club on the condition that they remained amateur. This was agreed by the club, who subsequently renamed the ground in Christie's honour.

In 1975, an incident at the end of a match where fans crossing the pitch to exit the stadium allegedly pushed the match referee to the ground. As a result, it was ordered by the Referee's Committee on 18 December that the ground be closed for the first two months of 1976. The club was fined £100 and it was ordered that police officers be present at every home game in the future. This type of punishment was unprecedented in Scottish football as it was the first time a club's stadium had been closed down.

Huntly's record attendance at Christie Park came in February 1995 when 4,500 spectators watched the club take on Dundee United in the fourth round of the Scottish Cup. The home side lost 3–1.

== Transport ==
The nearest railway station to the ground is Huntly railway station which is located half a mile south-east of Christie Park, roughly a 10-minute walk. The station is located on the Aberdeen to Inverness Line.

Access by road is served by the A96 between Inverness and Aberdeen, which passes to the south and west of the town.
