= Princess Royal Park =

Football ground in Banff, Scotland

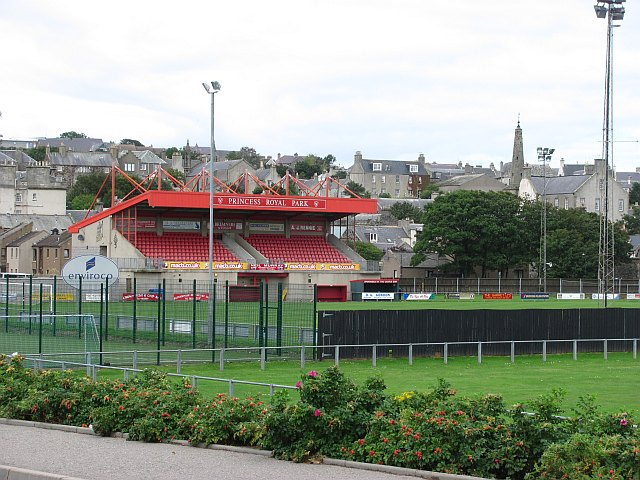

- Location in Aberdeenshire
- Location: Airlie Gardens, Banff, Aberdeenshire, Scotland
- Coordinates: 57°39′48″N 2°31′4″W
- Capacity: 2,600 (360 seated)
- Surface: grass
- Record attendance: 5,000 v Rangers; 27 April 1952
- Field size: 109 x 78 yards

Tenant
- Deveronvale F.C.

Princess Royal Park is a football ground in the town of Banff in the north-east of Scotland, which is the home ground of Highland Football League side Deveronvale. It is located on Airlie Gardens in the east of the town and has a capacity of 2,600 with 360 seated.

== History ==
Deveronvale's record attendance at Princess Royal Park came in April 1952 when 5,000 spectators watched the club take on Rangers of Glasgow.

The club's debut match in the Scottish Challenge Cup was at Princess Royal Park in July 2011 in the first round against Stirling Albion, The home side lost 3–1.

== Transport ==
The nearest railway station to the ground is Keith railway station, in the town of Keith, roughly 20 miles south-west of Banff. The station lies on the Aberdeen to Inverness Line. Huntly railway station lies on the same line and is located south-southwest of Banff, also around 20 miles away.
