= Formartine United F.C. =

Association football club in Scotland

Formartine United
- Full name: Formartine United Football Club
- Nickname: United
- Founded: 1948; 78 years ago
- Ground: North Lodge Park, Pitmedden
- Capacity: 1,800 (300 seated)
- Coordinates: 57°20′17″N 2°11′46″W
- Chairman: Atholl Cadger
- Manager: Stuart Anderson
- 2025–26: Highland League, 3rd of 18
- Website: formartineunitedfc.co.uk
Home colours	Away colours

Formartine United Football Club are a Scottish senior association football club from Pitmedden, Aberdeenshire currently playing in the Highland League. They joined the Highland League for the 2009–10 season, having been accepted into the League on 25 February 2009.

== History ==
Formartine United were formed in 1948. Formartine is actually a committee area in Aberdeenshire, the district extending north from the River Don to the River Ythan. The club are based in Pitmedden, a small rural village in Aberdeenshire which lies fourteen miles north of Aberdeen. The original village club was known as Pitmedden and the reasons behind the choice of name for the new club have never been clear. The club were admitted to a newly expanded Highland League in 2009. In 2013 the club won the much-coveted Aberdeenshire Cup, their first success at senior level. Prior to this the club won the North of Scotland Amateur Cup once and the North Regional Cup once. The club has three times been runner-up in the Highland League – in 2012–13, 2015–16 and 2017–18. They hold the record for the most goals scored in a Highland League season with 137 in 2015–16.

== Stadium ==
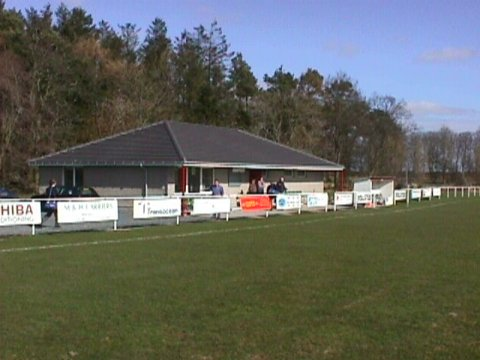
North Lodge Park

Formartine United plays its home games at North Lodge Park, Pitmedden. The stadium has a maximum capacity of 1,800 spectators.

== Senior honours ==
Highland League Cup:

- Winners: 2017–18

Aberdeenshire Cup:

- Winners: 2013–14, 2017–18

Aberdeenshire Shield:

- Winners: 2018–19

Aberdeenshire League:

- Winners: 2015–16, 2023–24

=== Junior honours ===
- North Region Premier Division winners: 2001–02
- North Regional (North) League winners: 1968–69
- North Region Premier Division Cup winners: 2005–06
- North East League Cup winners: 1998–99
- Archibald Cup winners: 1998–99
- McLeman Cup winners: 1998–99
- Duthie Cup winners: 1967–68, 2000–01, 2001–02
- Aberdeen Cable TV Cup winners: 1998–99
- North Drybrough Cup winners: 1971–72
- Morrison Trophy winners: 1978–79
