= Buckie Thistle F.C. =

Association football club in Scotland

Buckie Thistle
- Full name: Buckie Thistle Football Club
- Nickname: The Jags
- Founded: 1889; 137 years ago
- Ground: Victoria Park, Buckie
- Capacity: 3,000 (400 seated)
- Coordinates: 57.672275°N 2.967167°W
- Chairman: Garry Farquhar
- Manager: Lewis MacKinnon
- League: Highland League
- 2025–26: Highland League, 8th of 18
- Website: https://www.buckiethistlefc.co.uk
Home colours	Away colours

Buckie Thistle Football Club are a senior football club based in the town of Buckie, Moray, who currently play in Scotland's Highland League. Founded in 1889, they are also known as The Jags and play their football at Victoria Park, Buckie.

== History ==
Although there is no accurate date for Buckie Thistle's formation, it is widely accepted that the club was formed in 1889. The early years saw the club play a number of challenge matches before being accepted into the Banff and District League.
It was not until the 1909–10 season that Buckie Thistle joined the Highland League, becoming the first team from Banffshire to be accepted into the league, with Morayshire having been represented for several years by Forres Mechanics and Elgin City. Buckie have since gone on to win eleven league titles as well as numerous cup competitions, although they had to wait fifty-two years between their eighth (1957–58) and ninth (2009–10) title wins.

Buckie Thistle's first-choice kit is identical to that of Celtic's green and white hoops, and local legend has it that Celtic donated the strips to the club. In 1989 Celtic came north to play a friendly to mark The Jags centenary year and earlier, at the start of the decade, had visited Victoria Park to play in a fund-raising match for the spires appeal of St. Peters RC Church, Buckie.

The 1950s was a decade when all trophies available were won with regularity. It was during this era that Buckie Thistle travelled to Hampden Park to meet Queen's Park in a Scottish Cup 4th round replay on 30 October 1954, prevailing 2–1 and thus becoming the first – and still only – senior non-league club to have won a competitive match at the national stadium.
The ambitious club board has extensively developed the stadium in recent years, with a function hall being built within the perimeter of the ground, enabling sponsors and spectators to enjoy licensed and catering facilities pre- and post-match at the venue.

Horror author Stephen King mentioned Buckie Thistle in his 2020 book If It Bleeds. He then sent The Jags two copies of the book to be auctioned and a picture of himself in their football strip.

=== Season 2007–08 ===
Buckie Thistle bolstered their squad for the 2007–08 season with the signings of Craig MacMillan, Tony Low, Graeme Stewart, David Macrae, Brian Neill, Bob Duncan and Andrew Courage. The Jags started the season as one of the favourites to win the league title for the first time in 50 years and managed to live up to this tag early on with an opening day victory over Fraserburgh followed by a first round win away to Cove Rangers in the Aberdeenshire Cup. Buckie went on to lift the Aberdeenshire Cup with a 1–0 victory over Keith in the final after beating rivals Deveronvale in the semi-final.

Buckie went on to complete the Aberdeenshire Double by winning the Shield with a 3–0 victory over Inverurie Loco Works in the final, having defeated Fraserburgh and Huntly on the way to the final.

In their Scottish Cup campaign, Buckie started off with a 2–1 victory away to Glasgow University in the first round. It was the first year that all Highland League sides entered the Scottish Cup proper without having to qualify and Buckie looked to make the most of the opportunity to go far. The Jags progressed to the Third Round of the competition after defeating Highland League rivals Nairn County 4–1. Thistle were then handed a tough tie against Scottish First Division side Greenock Morton. After going 2–0 down early they fought back to 2–2, only for Morton to score a last minute winner and knock Buckie out of the cup.

After a good start to the league campaign, the second half of the season went less well after going out of the Scottish Cup. Buckie failed to beat fellow title rivals such as Keith and Cove Rangers and this ultimately ended their title hopes. Craig MacMillan was Buckie's top goalscorer in 2007–08, scoring 21 goals, while Stephen Bruce scored a total of 11 goals.

On 20 April 2008, former Aberdeen, Chelsea, Blackburn Rovers and Scotland international striker Duncan Shearer was sacked as manager of Buckie Thistle. Shearer was sacked just one day after a home defeat to Cove Rangers which all but ended Thistle's hopes of winning the league championship. During Shearer's reign as manager he managed to win the Aberdeenshire Cup twice and the Aberdeenshire Shield once.

On 13 May 2008, Kevin and Doug Will were revealed as Buckie Thistle's new management team for a second spell.

=== Season 2008–09 ===
Early transfer activity in what was the Wills second spell in charge saw Graeme Stewart leaving for Inverurie Locos before striker Charlie Brown arrived from Forres Mechanics. In addition Iain Good and Donnie Monro (returning to the club) were brought in from Peterhead and Martin Charlesworth from Elgin City. A late arrival to the club saw 23-year-old defender Stuart Cumming sign from Montrose in September.

On 17 October, Buckie Thistle announced the sacking of Kevin and Doug Will after a start to the season which saw the club fall 15 points behind in the league and get knocked out of the Challenge Cup, Aberdeenshire Cup and Aberdeenshire Shield. The 3–1 defeat to Junior Side Banks O'Dee in the Aberdeenshire Shield was their final game in charge.

Buckie appointed Gregg Carrol as manager on 21 October. Carrol had in fact already been offered the job back in May but had rejected it. Carrol was unable to prevent a 3–0 defeat to Lochee United in his first game in charge in the Scottish Cup. Buckie then suffered a 3–2 defeat to Clachnacuddin in the league before embarking on a nine-game winning streak, including wins over rivals Deveronvale and a 7–1 victory over Fort William leading them to be in contention for the title.

=== Season 2009–10 ===
Despite losing their opening two league games, Buckie went on to win the League Championship for the first time in 52 years, clinching the title on 1 May following a 3–0 win at Wick Academy. In addition they also won the Aberdeenshire Cup beating Cove Rangers 2–0 in September 2009, with both goals being scored by Stephen Bruce.

=== Season 2010–11 ===
On 7 May 2011, Buckie defeated their local rivals and nearest challengers Deveronvale 2–1 at Victoria Park to clinch the title for the second year in succession. Goals from Martin Charlesworth and Andy Low overturned an opening goal by Mark Chisholm. This was the first time that the Jags had won back to back titles since 1956–57 and 1957–58. In addition to retaining the League championship the club were runners up in the Aberdeenshire Cup, this time losing to Cove Rangers and reached the fifth round of the Scottish Cup narrowly losing 2–0 to Brechin City.

=== Season 2011–12 ===
The club entered the Challenge Cup for the first time, and were drawn away to Forfar Athletic in the first round. They lost 5–4 on penalties following a very creditable 1–1 draw. The season ended on a high note when the club won the Highland League Cup, beating Cove Rangers 2–0 at Banff.

However, they could not make it three Highland League titles in a row, as they finished fifth. The title was won by Forres Mechanics.

It was officially announced on 4 June 2012 that Gregg Carroll had resigned his post as Buckie Thistle manager and retired from football. He was replaced by his former assistant Gary Hake and then by Graeme Stewart.

== Club honours ==
Highland Football League:

- Champions: 1919–20, 1926–27, 1927–28, 1933–34, 1936–37, 1953–54, 1956–57, 1957–58, 2009–10, 2010–11, 2016–17, 2023–24

Highland League Cup:

- Winners: 1953–54, 1955–56, 1956–57, 1957–58, 1960–61, 1979–80, 1986–87, 2011–12

Aberdeenshire Cup:

- Winners: 1936–37, 1938–39, 1945–46, 1952–53, 1953–54, 1954–55, 1956–57, 1984–85, 1986–87, 2005–06, 2007–08, 2009–10, 2016–17

Aberdeenshire Shield:

- Winners: 1992–93, 2007–08

Scottish Qualifying Cup (North):

- Winners: 1952–53, 1953–54, 1958–59, 2003–04

Aberdeenshire League:

- Winners: 1923–24, 1924–25, 1929–30, 1930–31, 1931–32, 1938–39, 1945–46, 1949–50, 1951–52, 1952–53, 2002–03, 2003–04

Elgin District Cup:

- Winners: 1901–02, 1912–13, 1913–14
