= Fraserburgh F.C. =

Association football club in Scotland

Fraserburgh
- Full name: Fraserburgh Football Club
- Nickname: The Broch
- Founded: 1910; 116 years ago
- Ground: Bellslea Park, Fraserburgh
- Capacity: 3,000 (480 seated)
- Coordinates: 57.68949°N 2.005287°W
- Chairman: Michael Murray
- Manager: Mark Cowie
- League: Highland League
- 2025–26: Highland League, 4th of 18
- Website: fraserburghfc.scot
Home colours	Away colours

Fraserburgh Football Club is a senior football club based in Fraserburgh, Aberdeenshire. The fishing port is known locally as 'The Broch' hence the club nickname. They currently play in the Highland League in Scotland and also enter the annual Scottish Cup.

== History ==
The club was formed in 1910 and play at Bellslea Park. Prior to 1910, it played as a select side made up of the best players from the local amateur league. The club's colours (consisting of black and white stripes) were acquired from a local fish merchant who had links with Newcastle United, and the tradition has since been kept, with the traditional away kit consisting of a sky blue shirt, white shorts and sky blue socks.

Fraserburgh's first ever match was an away tie in the Scottish Qualifying Cup against rivals Peterhead, which Fraserburgh won 3–1. In their first season they went on to win the Aberdeenshire Cup, defeating Buckie Thistle at Pittodrie Stadium.

They were granted admission into the Highland Football League in 1921 and up until that time they competed in the Aberdeenshire Cup and Scottish Cup.

Fraserburgh's most famous victory was in the Scottish Cup on 31 January 1959, where they defeated Dundee, one of the top clubs in Scotland at the time, 1–0 at Bellslea Park. This is widely regarded as the biggest ever 'giant killing' shock in the Scottish Cup.

On 21 January 1970, the Fraserburgh lifeboat The Duchess of Kent was lost, being turned over by a freak wave approximately 40 miles (64 km) from Fraserburgh while trying to escort the Danish fishing vessel Opal to safety. Only one of the six crew members survived. After the disaster, Jock Stein took his Celtic side to the Broch for a fundraising game, which Fraserburgh lost 7–0.

Another one of Fraserburgh's most memorable games was a 10–0 victory away to local rivals Peterhead in the Highland League Cup on 14 August 1974. They have always had a rivalry with Peterhead but as Peterhead got promoted into the Scottish league the rivalry has wavered somewhat.

During 1984, Charlie Duncan was named new manager due to Brian McCann's departure; he eventually went on to manage his 1,000th game in charge during October 2009 in a Scottish Cup tie against Bonnyrigg Rose. Duncan's tenure brought huge success to the club; becoming champions for only the third time in the club's history, winning the Highland League Cup for the first time in 47 years, the two Qualifying Cup wins in 1995–96 and 2006–07, as well as an Aberdeenshire Cup in 1996 and five Aberdeenshire Shield wins – 1991, 1993, 1995, 1996 and 1999. Duncan's tenure ended when he was sacked from the club in July 2011, after an eventful 27 years at the helm.

Fraserburgh are now the permanent holders of the Qualifying Cup (North), as they won the last competition at Princess Royal Park, Banff when they beat Keith 2–1 in November 2006, with goals from Marc Dickson and Michael Stephen.

The club has progressed to the fourth round (last 32) of the Scottish Cup three times. In 2013–14 they lost 3–0 away to Stenhousemuir. In 2017–18 they lost at home to Rangers 3–0. And in January 2025 they lost 5-0 at Ibrox, again to Rangers.

In 2022 Fraserburgh secured their fourth Highland League title – their first for 20 years. As champions, Fraserburgh progressed to the Pyramid Play-offs where they played Bonnyrigg Rose; losing 3–1 away and winning 1–0 at Bellslea, thus losing 3–2 on aggregate.

Also as a result of being Highland League champions, Fraserburgh qualified for the 2022–23 Scottish League Cup, being drawn in Group B with Kilmarnock, Montrose, Stenhousemuir, and Partick Thistle.

== Stadium ==
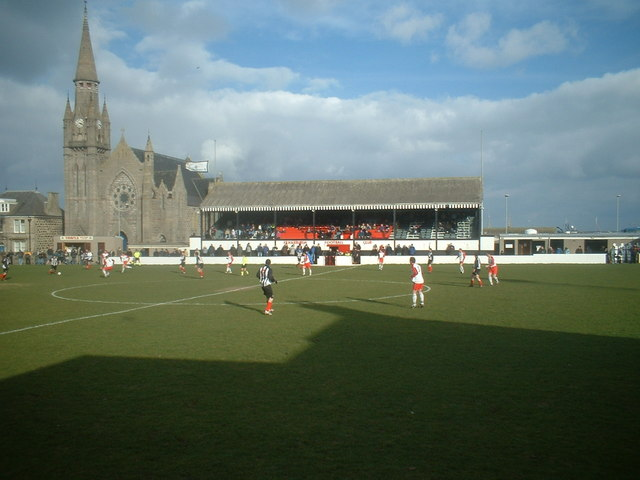
Bellslea Park

The club's home ground is Bellslea Park. The capacity is 3,000 and the stand can hold 480 people.

== Honours ==
- Highland Football League: 1932–33, 1937–38, 2001–02, 2021–22
- Highland League Cup: 1958–59, 2005–06
- Aberdeenshire Cup: 1910–11, 1937–38, 1955–56, 1963–64, 1972–73, 1975–76, 1996–97, 2012–13, 2014–15, 2015–16, 2019–20, 2020–21, 2022–23
- Aberdeenshire Shield: 1991–92, 1993–94, 1995–96, 1996–97, 1999–00, 2011–12, 2015–16, 2019–20, 2022–23, 2024–25, 2025–26
- Scottish Qualifying Cup (North): 1957–58, 1995–96, 2006–07
- Aberdeenshire League: 1922–23, 1932–33, 1933–34, 1937–38, 1950–51, 1994–95, 1995–96, 1997–98, 2022–23, 2024–25
- Bells Cup (East): 1972–73, 1973–74, 1975–76, 1976–77, 1978–79
