= Inverurie Loco Works F.C. =

Association football club in Scotland

Inverurie Loco Works
- Full name: Inverurie Loco Works Football Club
- Nicknames: The Locos, The Railwaymen
- Founded: 1902
- Ground: Harlaw Park, Inverurie
- Capacity: 2,500 (175 seated)
- Coordinates: 57.2915°N 2.3824°W
- Chairman: Mike Macaulay
- Manager: Dean Donaldson
- League: Highland League
- 2025–26: Highland League, 15th of 18
Home colours	Away colours

Inverurie Loco Works Football Club are a senior semi-professional football club from Inverurie, Aberdeenshire, Scotland, who currently play in the Highland League.

== History ==
The club was founded in 1902 by workmen from the Great North of Scotland Railway (GNSR) who had their Locomotive, and Carriage and Wagon Workshops in Inverurie, from where the football club got its name. On National Railway Company 'Grouping' in 1923, the GNSR became part of the London & North Eastern Railway, one of the UK's big four railway companies at that time, and the football club lived on.

In the 1945-46 Aberdeenshire & District Junior League, Inverurie Locos scored 146 goals in 22 games, averaging 6.64 goals per game. They won the league that season, remaining unbeaten throughout the entire league campaign.

The Locomotive Workshops themselves were formally closed in 1970 on the forming of British Rail Engineering Limited (BREL), a wholly owned subsidiary of the British Railways Board at that time. Despite the closure, Inverurie Loco Works F.C. continued to play in the Aberdeenshire and North East Junior Leagues for many years.

Rising up from successful years in junior football, in 2001 the Locos applied for membership of the Highland League and were successful. In the 2003–04 season, the Locos came second in the league, two further consecutive 2nd-place finishes followed in the seasons to come. In 2005, they first got their hands on silverware by winning the Scottish Qualifying Cup, then repeated the feat the next year. They also won the Aberdeenshire Shield after being runners up three times before winning the trophy. Then they won the Fosters Cup (League Cup) twice in two years, in 2007–08 and 2008–09. They also won the SFA North Region Challenge Cup in 2008–09.

In the 2008–09 Scottish Cup, the club were paired with Scottish Premier League side Motherwell at home. They reached the fourth round of the competition that season. After four postponements, the match was finally played at the fifth time of asking. Despite a capacity crowd watching, the Highland League outfit could not prevent a 3–0 loss to their top-flight opponents.

== Harlaw Park ==
Inverurie Loco Works have played at Harlaw Park for their entire history. Originally, it was an open field, but now it is a fully-enclosed football ground with a seated grandstand and a standing shelter.

It currently has an approximate overall capacity of 2,500; 175 seated, and the rest standing.

In March 1931, a pavilion and a grandstand was opened and in 1950 the installation of new dressing rooms was completed. Harlaw Park got new turnstiles in 1962.

In 1981, the Banchory Golf Club clubhouse was re-located to Harlaw Park as the Social Club.

Floodlights which were surplus to requirements at Aberdeen Airport were installed, and new dugouts were created in August 1983. New changing rooms were built in 1992.

In preparation for Inverurie Locos first Highland League season (2001/02) £75,000 was spent on upgrading Harlaw Park and a new enclosure was opened for the 2002/03 season.

The 2012–13 season saw the current grandstand erected, replacing the old one.

Harlaw Park hosted 3 matches in the 2014 UEFA Women's Under-17 Championship qualification in August 2013.

== Staff ==
=== First team coaching staff ===
As of 26 August 2024

Position	Name
Manager	Dean Donaldson
Assistant Manager	Vacant
Coach	Jamie Lennox
Coach	Kenny Clubb
Goalkeeping Coach	John Farquhar
Strength and Conditioning Coach	James Collins

=== Committee ===
As of 12 August 2024

Position	Name
Chairman	Mike Macaulay
Vice-chairman	Graeme Hay
Treasurer	Jim Porter
Secretary	Billy Thomson
Hospitality	Iain Alexander
SHFL Representative	Gordon Booth
Football Operations	Scott Buchan
Support Liaison/Facilities	Rhys Collie
Child Protection	Mark Cooper
Events	Paula Corsar
Commercial	Barry Gibb
First Aid	Stuart Gordon
Youth Academy	Gary Jamieson
Events	Gill Macaulay
Locos Ladies/Hospitality	Kirsteen MacGillivray
Systems/Health & Safety	Derek Smart
Youth Compliance/Matchday Announcer	Daniel Wilson
Facilities/Club Licence	Fred Wilson

== Honours ==
=== Senior ===
- Highland League Cup: 2007–08, 2008–09
- Aberdeenshire Cup: 2023–24
- Aberdeenshire Shield: 2003–04, 2013–14, 2016–17
- Scottish Qualifying Cup (North): 2004–05, 2005–06
- SFA North Challenge Cup: 2008–09
- Aberdeenshire League: 2018–19, 2019–20, 2025–26

=== Junior ===
- North Region League (East) Premier Division: 1992–93, 1995–96, 1997–98
- Aberdeen & District League: 1925–26, 1928–29, 1929–30, 1930–31, 1931–32, 1932–33, 1934–35, 1935–36, 1936–37, 1942–43, 1945–46, 1954–55, 1959–60, 1960–61, 1961–62
- North Regional Cup: 1968–69, 1995–96, 2000–01
- Aberdeen & District League Cup: 1927–28, 1928–29, 1929–30, 1931–32, 1945–46
- North Region (East) League Cup: 1986–87, 1988–89, 1991–92
- McLeman Cup: 1928–29, 1951–52, 1968–69, 1970–71
- Archibald Cup: 1928–29, 1932–33, 1937–38, 1938–39, 1939–40, 1954–55, 1960–61, 1961–62, 1968–69, 1980–81, 1999–2000
- Duthie Cup: 1928–29, 1932–33, 1933–34, 1935–36, 1939–40, 1960–61
- Aberdeen County Trophy: 1912–13, 1913–14, 1934–35, 1935–36, 1939–40, 1942–43, 1944–45, 1954–55, 1960–61, 1961–62
- Jimmy Gibb Memorial Trophy: 1995–96, 1997–98
- Wick Allan Shield: 1995–96, 1997–98
- Fowler Cup: 1927–28 (final played during the 1928–29 season)

== Ladies ==
Inverurie Loco Works Ladies play in the Scottish Women's Football Championship.

On 8 July 2022, Inverurie Loco Works announced the formation of a Ladies team. They started playing in the 2023 season, finishing in second place in the SWFL North. They won the league in the 2023–24 season, without dropping a single point.

=== Honours ===
- SWFL North: 2023–24

== Youth academy ==
Inverurie Loco Works' Youth Academy consists of a Men's Under 18s team, and a Men's Under 21s team.

=== Under 18s ===
Inverurie Locos' Men's Under 18s play in the SHFL U18 East. They also enter the Scottish Youth Cup.

They won the league back-to-back in the 2022–23 season and the 2023–24 season. On both occasions, their league victory earned them a spot in that season's SHFL U18 Championship Play-Off. They won the Championship both times.

==== Honours ====
- Highland League U18 East: 2022–23, 2023–24
- Highland League U18 Championship: 2022–23, 2023–24

=== Under 21s ===
Inverurie Locos' Men's U21s play in the Aberdeenshire League. They won the league in 2018–19 season, and the 2019–20 season.

==== Honours ====
- Aberdeenshire League: 2018–19, 2019–20
