= Deveronvale F.C. =

Association football club in Scotland

Deveronvale
- Full name: Deveronvale Football Club
- Nickname: Vale
- Founded: 1938; 88 years ago
- Ground: Princess Royal Park, Banff
- Capacity: 2,651 (360 seated)
- Coordinates: 57.663317°N 2.517765°W
- Chairman: Aaron Lorimer
- Manager: Garry Wood
- League: Highland League
- 2025–26: Highland League, 14th of 18
- Website: deveronvale.co.uk
Home colours	Away colours

Deveronvale Football Club are a senior association football club currently playing the Highland League in Scotland. They were founded in 1938 and play their football at the Princess Royal Park in the town of Banff, (formerly Banffshire, now officially Aberdeenshire), Scotland.

The club was formed in 1938 when Deveron Valley and Banff Rovers joined, five years after the demise of the previous senior club in the town, Banff F.C. The name comes from the River Deveron, which has its mouth at Banff.

After they were formed, it took them one year to get into the Highland League. In August 1939, Deveronvale played their first league game. Their first win came a month later. In 1948 Deveronvale signed James ‘Jimmy’ Williamson from Dunipace Juniors, Jimmy would go on to play for Deveronvale for 7 years and in the process set the record for highest number of individual goals in the Highland League at 197 goals. The crest of Deveronvale FC was designed during the early 1970s by local school teacher, Mr. Chris Murray. He chose a 'heraldic' seagull to represent the twin fishing towns of Banff and Macduff.

In 2003 the Vale won the Highland League title for the first time in their history and repeated this feat once more three years later.

Due to them being a senior team, they can play in the Scottish Cup. In the 2006–07 season, Deveronvale made it into the fourth round of the Scottish Cup after a 5–4 defeat of Third Division side Elgin City, before going out at home to First Division side Partick Thistle.

In the 2011–12 season, Deveronvale entered the Scottish Challenge Cup for the first time.

The club celebrated its 80th anniversary in the 2018–19 season.

== Club officials ==
=== Technical Staff ===
- Manager: Garry Wood
- First-team coach: Grant Noble
- Goalkeeping coach: Mikey Grant
- Assistant coach: Pat McPherson
- Head of Youth Development: John Milne
- Sports therapist: Andrea McIntosh
- Sports therapist: Rachel Mair
- Kit Man: Lenny Binnie

=== Club Management ===
- Chairman: Aaron Lorimer
- Board of Directors:
  - Peter Bruce (Finance Director)
  - Hamish Mcleay (Director)
  - Mark Watson (Director)
  - Amanda Allan (Director + Child Welfare & Protection Officer)
  - Stuart Wilson (Commercial Director)
- Secretary & Director: Lauren Gibb
- Assistant Secretary: Stewart McPherson

== Hall of Fame ==
The club launched a Hall of Fame as part of the club's 80th anniversary celebrations in 2019, with the following inductees honoured:

- Eddie Bruce
- Stewart McPherson
- Jim Leighton

The intention is that one or more inductees will be considered every year.

== Honours ==
- Highland Football League
  - Champions (2): 2002–03, 2005–06
- Aberdeenshire Cup
  - Winners (8): 1947–48, 1950–51, 1951–52, 1961–62, 1965–66, 2000–01, 2006–07, 2011–12
- Aberdeenshire Shield
  - Winner (2): 1994–95, 2002–03
- Scottish Qualifying Cup (North)
  - Winners (2): 1951–52, 2001–02
- Bells Cup (East)
  - Winners (1): 1977–78
