= Huntly F.C. =

Association football club in Scotland

Huntly
- Full name: Huntly Football Club
- Nicknames: The Black and Golds
- Founded: 1928; 98 years ago
- Ground: Christie Park, Huntly
- Capacity: 4,500 (270 seated)
- Coordinates: 57.449115°N 2.783079°W
- Chairman: Gordon Carter
- Manager: Graeme Stewart
- League: Highland League
- 2025–26: Highland League, 11th of 18
- Website: https://www.huntlyfc.co.uk/
Home colours	Away colours

Huntly Football Club are a senior football club, currently playing in the Highland League in Scotland. The club was founded in 1928 and plays at Christie Park in Huntly.

== History ==
Huntly F.C. was formed in 1928. They were unanimously accepted to the Highland League at the league's AGM in June 1928. The club entered the league in season 1928–29 and the first game was against Inverness Thistle on Saturday 25 August 1928. In only its second league campaign, Huntly became only the third team outside Inverness to win the league, finishing two points ahead of closest rivals Elgin City and Inverness Thistle. However, the club would have to wait 64 years for another championship win and to many supporters the greatest moment in the club's history. The club then won the Highland League in a record five successive seasons between 1993 and 1998.

In December 1975 the Referee's Committee of the Scottish Football Association ordered the closure of Christie Park for two months following an incident in which a referee was knocked to the ground by a supporter making his way home across the pitch after a match. The club were also fined £100 and ordered to have Police on duty at all future matches.

In January 2008 Huntly reached the 4th Round proper of the Scottish Cup following victories against Fraserburgh, Annan Athletic and Culter, and although drawn at home to Division 1 team Dundee, they eventually lost 1–3. In September 2009, the club became part of a match fixing probe after a 7–0 win against (then) East of Scotland side Hawick Royal Albert in a Scottish Cup tie. Suspicions arose due to alleged irregular betting patterns surrounding the final score and the awarding of a penalty to Huntly during the game. Nothing was proven and no further actions were taken.

== Honours ==
- Highland Football League
  - Champions: 1929–30, 1993–94, 1994–95, 1995–96, 1996–97, 1997–98, 2004–05
- League Cup
  - Winners: 1948–49, 1951–52, 1992–93, 1993–94, 1995–96
- Aberdeenshire Cup
  - Winners: 1960–61, 1985–86, 1991–92, 1993–94, 1994–95, 1995–96, 1999–00
- Scottish Qualifying Cup (North)
  - Winners: 1992–93, 1994–95, 1996–97, 1999–00
- SFA North Region Challenge Cup
  - Winners: 2007–08
- Aberdeenshire League
  - Winners: 2016–17
- Bells Cup (East)
  - Winners: 1971–72, 1974–75
- Drybrough Cup (Highland League)
  - Winners: 1971–72
