= 2012–13 Highland Football League =

Press & Journal Highland League
- Season: 2012–13
- Champions: Cove Rangers
- Matches: 306
- Goals: 1,192 (3.9 per match)
- Biggest home win: Brora Rangers 12–2 Fort William
- Biggest away win: Rothes 1–9 Inverurie Loco Works; Rothes 1–9 Brora Rangers
- Highest scoring: Brora Rangers 12–2 Fort William

The 2012–13 Highland Football League (known as the Press & Journal Highland League for sponsorship reasons) was the 110th season of the Highland Football League. The season began on 4 August 2012 and ended on 25 May 2013. Forres Mechanics were the defending champions.

The league was won by Cove Rangers, their fourth Highland League title.

== Teams ==
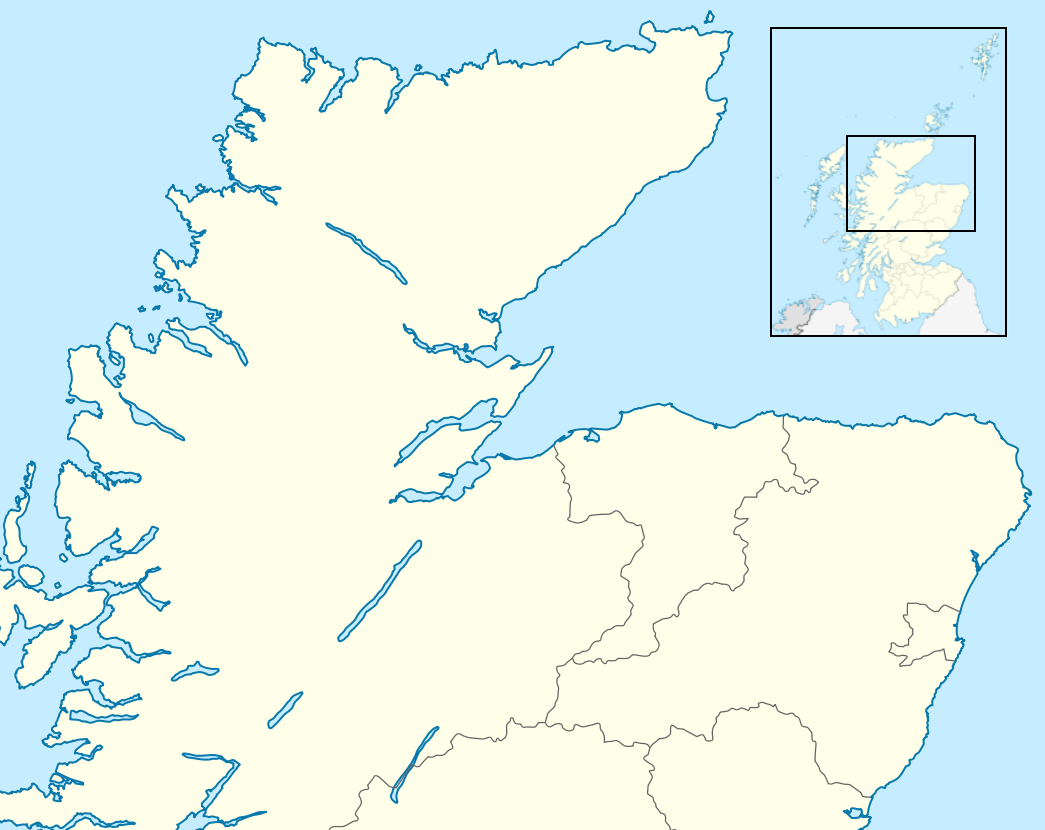
Location of teams in 2012–13 Scottish Highland Football League

Team	Location	Home ground	Capacity	Ref.
Brora Rangers	Brora	Dudgeon Park	3,000	
Buckie Thistle	Buckie	Victoria Park	4,000	
Clachnacuddin	Inverness	Grant Street Park	3,000	
Cove Rangers	Cove Bay, Aberdeen	Allan Park	1,400	
Deveronvale	Banff	Princess Royal Park	2,600	
Formartine United	Pitmedden	North Lodge Park	1,800	
Forres Mechanics	Forres	Mosset Park	4,500	
Fort William	Fort William	Claggan Park	1,800	
Fraserburgh	Fraserburgh	Bellslea Park	3,000	
Huntly	Huntly	Christie Park	3,500	
Inverurie Loco Works	Inverurie	Harlaw Park	1,400	
Keith	Keith	Kynoch Park	4,500	
Lossiemouth	Lossiemouth	Grant Park	3,000	
Nairn County	Nairn	Station Park	2,250	
Rothes	Rothes	Mackessack Park	2,800	
Strathspey Thistle	Grantown-on-Spey	Seafield Park	1,600	
Turriff United	Turriff	The Haughs	2,135	
Wick Academy	Wick	Harmsworth Park	2,414	

== League table ==
Pos	Team	Pld	W	D	L	GF	GA	GD	Pts	Qualification
1	Cove Rangers (C)	34	25	5	4	101	26	+75	80	Qualification for 2013–14 Scottish Cup Second round
2	Formartine United	34	25	3	6	106	39	+67	78	Qualification for 2013–14 Scottish Cup Second round
3	Wick Academy	34	25	1	8	101	48	+53	76	
4	Nairn County	34	22	5	7	80	43	+37	71	
5	Clachnacuddin	34	21	3	10	68	49	+19	66	
6	Fraserburgh	34	18	5	11	83	47	+36	59	
7	Deveronvale	34	17	7	10	66	45	+21	58	
8	Brora Rangers	34	17	4	13	83	52	+31	55	
9	Forres Mechanics	34	16	7	11	78	49	+29	55	
10	Inverurie Loco Works	34	16	5	13	71	60	+11	53	
11	Turriff United	34	16	4	14	68	67	+1	52	
12	Buckie Thistle	34	13	7	14	58	62	−4	46	
13	Huntly	34	14	3	17	66	68	−2	45	
14	Keith	34	12	7	15	56	65	−9	43	
15	Strathspey Thistle	34	5	0	29	23	112	−89	15	
16	Rothes	34	4	2	28	29	126	−97	14	
17	Lossiemouth	34	3	1	30	35	108	−73	10	
18	Fort William	34	1	3	30	20	126	−106	6	

Source: Soccerway
Rules for classification: 1) points; 2) goal difference; 3) number of goals scored.
(C) Champions

== Results ==
Home \ Away	BRO	BUC	CLA	COV	DEV	FRM	FRR	FRT	FRA	HUN	LOC	KEI	LOS	NAI	ROT	STR	TUR	WIC
Brora Rangers		1–3	1–2	1–1	4–1	1–2	0–1	12–2	0–3	1–0	2–1	4–1	6–0	3–4	2–0	3–0	4–0	5–0
Buckie Thistle	1–0		1–2	1–1	0–1	1–4	0–3	3–3	1–3	0–3	1–1	1–3	6–0	1–1	2–1	7–1	2–0	0–7
Clachnacuddin	1–0	2–3		0–1	1–2	1–3	3–1	4–0	1–4	3–1	3–3	1–1	3–2	1–0	3–1	5–0	1–2	1–0
Cove Rangers	2–2	2–1	3–2		3–1	2–1	3–1	6–0	4–1	1–0	7–0	2–2	4–0	3–1	5–0	9–0	7–0	3–1
Deveronvale	5–0	2–1	1–1	0–2		0–0	2–2	2–1	2–1	1–2	0–1	1–0	3–2	1–0	1–0	2–0	3–3	6–0
Formartine United	2–1	3–0	5–1	0–2	4–0		2–2	4–1	3–1	6–0	3–2	4–1	3–1	1–3	5–0	9–1	2–1	3–3
Forres Mechanics	1–2	3–2	1–3	0–2	2–2	2–1		5–0	1–1	1–1	2–3	1–1	5–2	0–1	8–1	6–1	1–2	4–1
Fort William	1–5	1–5	0–2	0–6	1–7	1–5	1–3		0–7	0–1	1–4	0–3	0–0	1–5	0–2	1–0	0–2	0–3
Fraserburgh	0–0	2–0	2–3	1–1	4–0	2–3	2–2	6–0		3–2	3–1	1–3	5–0	2–4	5–1	4–1	4–2	1–3
Huntly	1–1	0–1	1–2	0–3	0–3	1–6	0–1	3–0	2–1		4–4	1–3	3–1	3–2	7–0	7–1	2–1	2–3
Inverurie Loco Works	0–1	2–2	1–3	0–5	0–1	1–3	0–2	3–1	2–0	3–1		3–1	3–1	0–1	2–0	5–0	1–0	2–0
Keith	1–2	1–2	1–2	1–0	1–1	0–1	2–1	1–1	0–3	2–0	2–4		3–4	1–2	4–2	5–1	1–1	1–6
Lossiemouth	1–3	0–4	0–1	2–3	0–4	1–2	0–3	3–1	0–4	0–4	1–4	2–4		1–3	7–0	0–0	1–3	0–4
Nairn County	6–0	2–2	3–1	3–2	2–1	1–4	1–0	5–1	1–1	1–3	3–3	1–1	6–0		4–0	1–0	4–0	3–2
Rothes	1–9	2–3	1–2	0–2	1–1	0–7	0–3	5–0	0–2	0–5	1–9	0–3	3–2	1–3		0–1	2–2	0–4
Strathspey Thistle	1–5	1–3	0–3	0–2	0–3	0–3	2–4	1–0	0–1	2–3	0–3	0–1	3–1	0–3	3–1		0–2	1–4
Turriff United	4–2	1–1	1–2	2–1	2–1	2–1	2–5	2–0	0–1	7–3	3–0	3–0	3–0	0–2	7–1	1–2		4–3
Wick Academy	3–0	2–1	4–0	2–1	4–1	3–1	3–1	1–0	4–1	4–0	1–0	5–1	5–3	1–0	5–0	4–0	6–2	

Updated to match(es) played on 26 March 2013. Source: Highland Football League
Legend: Blue = home team win; Yellow = draw; Red = away team win.
