= 1991–92 Highland Football League =

Highland League
- Season: 1991–1992
- Champions: Ross County

The 1991–1992 Highland Football League was won by Ross County.

== Table ==
Pos	Team	Pld	W	D	L	GF	GA	GD	Pts
1	Ross County (C)	34	24	3	7	95	43	+52	75
2	Caledonian	34	23	6	5	93	33	+60	75
3	Huntly	34	21	7	6	70	43	+27	70
4	Cove Rangers	34	18	9	7	62	35	+27	63
5	Keith	34	18	6	10	67	45	+22	60
6	Lossiemouth	34	17	7	10	62	42	+20	58
7	Buckie Thistle	34	17	6	11	46	58	−12	57
8	Elgin City	34	16	6	12	76	51	+25	54
9	Peterhead	34	16	6	12	61	59	+2	54
10	Inverness Thistle	34	14	8	12	54	57	−3	50
11	Forres Mechanics	34	13	8	13	66	62	+4	47
12	Clachnacuddin	34	11	6	17	43	51	−8	39
13	Deveronvale	34	12	3	19	40	58	−18	39
14	Brora Rangers	34	11	5	18	67	52	+15	38
15	Fraserburgh	34	11	3	20	43	67	−24	36
16	Fort William	34	8	4	22	48	63	−15	28
17	Rothes	34	4	4	26	35	99	−64	16
18	Nairn County	34	3	3	28	24	111	−87	12

Source: Scottish Football Historical Archive - Highland League Final Tables
Rules for classification: 1) points; 2) goal difference; 3) number of goals scored.
(C) Champions
