= John Sheran =

Scottish footballer and manager

Personal information
- Date of birth: 8 August 1960 (age 66)
- Place of birth: Torphins, Aberdeenshire, Scotland
- Position: Central defender

Team information
- Current team: Cove Rangers (director of football)

Youth career
- Ellon United

Senior career*
Years	Team	Apps	(Gls)
1978–1988	Montrose	281	(16)
1988–1989	Nairn County		
1989–1991	Montrose	25	(2)
- Deveronvale
Total		306	(18)

Managerial career
- 1998–2000: Montrose (assistant)
- 2000–2001: Montrose
- 2002–2009: Cove Rangers
- 2011: Peterhead
- 2014–2019: Cove Rangers
- * Club domestic league appearances and goals

John Sheran (born 8 August 1960, in Torphins) is a Scottish former football player and manager.

Sheran made over 300 playing appearances in the Scottish Football League for Montrose. He was appointed assistant manager of the club in 1998 and became their manager in 2000. Sheran was sacked by Montrose in October 2003. He then managed Highland League club Cove Rangers. He was appointed manager of Peterhead in March 2011, but was sacked in September after the team started the 2011–12 season badly.

On 10 May 2014 Sheran rejoined Cove Rangers to become their new manager. Cove won the Highland League in both 2017–18 and 2018–19. Shortly after the team was presented with the 2018–19 championship, Sheran suffered a heart attack. During the 2019 close season, Sheran advised Cove Rangers that he could not continue as their manager. The club moved Sheran to a director of football role, with Paul Hartley succeeding him as manager.

== Managerial statistics ==
As of 14 June 2019

Team	Nat	From	To	Record				
Team	Nat	From	To	G	W	D	L	Win %
Montrose	(Scotland)	10 October 2000	31 May 2001	33	8	8	17	24.24
Peterhead	(Scotland)	22 May 2011	1 September 2011	16	1	4	11	6.25
Cove Rangers	(Scotland)	10 May 2014	2 July 2019	114	82	13	19	71.93

- statistics based on soccerbase website.

== Honours ==
=== Manager ===
Cove Rangers

- Highland Football League (3): 2015-16, 2017-18, 2018-19
- Highland League Cup (3): 2014–15, 2016–17, 2018–19
- Aberdeenshire Shield : 2017–18
- Aberdeenshire Cup : 2018–19
- Scottish League Two play-offs : 2018-19
