= 1994–95 Highland Football League =

Highland League
- Season: 1994–1995
- Champions: Huntly

The 1994–1995 Highland Football League was won by Huntly. The league was reduced to sixteen teams after Ross County along with Caledonian and Inverness Thistle (as the newly formed Caledonian Thistle) left to join the Scottish Football League. Wick Academy, formerly of the North Caledonian Football League was elected in their place.

== Table ==
Pos	Team	Pld	W	D	L	GF	GA	GD	Pts
1	Huntly (C)	30	24	2	4	102	30	+72	74
2	Cove Rangers	30	18	3	9	69	38	+31	57
3	Lossiemouth	30	17	3	10	75	53	+22	54
4	Keith	30	16	5	9	59	32	+27	53
5	Brora Rangers	30	15	7	8	63	41	+22	52
6	Peterhead	30	15	7	8	64	43	+21	52
7	Fraserburgh	30	16	4	10	56	43	+13	52
8	Elgin City	30	15	3	12	52	42	+10	48
9	Deveronvale	30	14	5	11	58	49	+9	47
10	Buckie Thistle	30	12	8	10	50	52	−2	44
11	Forres Mechanics	30	12	5	13	46	56	−10	41
12	Fort William	30	11	4	15	46	57	−11	37
13	Clachnacuddin	30	7	5	18	37	61	−24	26
14	Wick Academy	30	7	4	19	32	77	−45	25
15	Rothes	30	2	5	23	27	77	−50	11
16	Nairn County	30	3	2	25	20	105	−85	11

Source: Scottish Football Historical Archive - Highland League Final Tables
Rules for classification: 1) points; 2) goal difference; 3) number of goals scored.
(C) Champions
