= 2010–11 Highland Football League =

Scot-Ads Highland League
- Season: 2010–11
- Champions: Buckie Thistle
- Matches: 306
- Goals: 1,268 (4.14 per match)
- Top goalscorer: 35 - Cammy Keith (Keith)
- Biggest home win: Deveronvale 9–0 Fort William; 12 March 2011; Formartine United 11–2 Fort William; 16 April 2011
- Biggest away win: Fort William 0–8 Inverurie Loco Works; 21 August 2010
- Highest scoring: Formartine United 11–2 Fort William; 16 April 2011
- Longest winning run: 11 - Cove Rangers (12 March–11 May 2011)
- Longest unbeaten run: 17 - Deveronvale (30 October–9 April)
- Longest winless run: 25 - Strathspey Thistle (4 September–27 April)
- Longest losing run: 12 - Fort William (12 March–7 May)

The 2010–11 Highland Football League began on 31 July 2010 and ended on 31 May 2011. Buckie Thistle won the league for the second consecutive year. Fort William finished bottom.

== Table ==
Pos	Team	Pld	W	D	L	GF	GA	GD	Pts
1	Buckie Thistle (C)	34	24	5	5	84	42	+42	77
2	Deveronvale	34	23	3	8	100	45	+55	72
3	Cove Rangers	34	22	5	7	100	43	+57	71
4	Keith	34	22	4	8	92	54	+38	70
5	Nairn County	34	18	9	7	86	49	+37	63
6	Forres Mechanics	34	19	6	9	72	56	+16	63
7	Inverurie Loco Works	34	19	5	10	81	50	+31	62
8	Turriff United	34	15	8	11	89	60	+29	53
9	Formartine United	34	15	3	16	71	68	+3	48
10	Huntly	34	13	6	15	63	72	−9	45
11	Brora Rangers	34	13	6	15	51	64	−13	45
12	Lossiemouth	34	12	8	14	52	63	−11	44
13	Fraserburgh	34	11	9	14	69	65	+4	42
14	Wick Academy	34	12	3	19	75	78	−3	39
15	Clachnacuddin	34	9	7	18	68	89	−21	34
16	Rothes	34	6	4	24	43	92	−49	22
17	Strathspey Thistle	34	2	4	28	36	131	−95	10
18	Fort William	34	2	3	29	36	148	−112	9

Updated to match(es) played on 31 May 2011. Source: Highland Football League
Rules for classification: 1) points; 2) goal difference; 3) number of goals scored.
(C) Champions

== Results ==
Home \ Away	BRO	BUC	CLA	COV	DEV	FRM	FRR	FRT	FRA	HUN	LOC	KEI	LOS	NAI	ROT	STR	TUR	WIC
Brora Rangers		2–1	3–0	0–2	1–2	0–2	3–1	3–0	4–2	0–1	2–1	0–3	3–3	0–4	0–0	0–0	1–1	2–3
Buckie Thistle	2–1		3–1	1–3	2–1	2–0	1–1	9–1	0–0	2–1	2–1	2–0	1–0	3–1	2–1	6–1	2–0	3–1
Clachnacuddin	0–3	3–5		1–3	1–1	2–3	2–3	5–2	3–3	2–2	3–3	2–2	2–2	0–0	0–1	5–2	4–2	2–1
Cove Rangers	4–1	2–3	7–0		2–3	3–0	1–2	5–0	3–1	5–2	2–2	0–1	5–1	4–2	3–0	7–0	1–2	5–3
Deveronvale	2–3	7–0	0–3	1–1		7–1	3–1	9–0	2–1	4–1	2–0	3–0	2–0	1–1	4–1	6–0	2–1	2–1
Formartine United	1–1	0–3	2–4	2–3	3–2		0–4	11–2	0–0	0–1	2–3	2–3	2–0	1–1	7–1	5–1	2–1	4–2
Forres Mechanics	5–3	2–2	4–1	3–2	3–1	2–1		3–2	7–1	2–2	3–1	0–3	1–1	1–0	1–1	3–0	2–0	2–1
Fort William	1–2	1–4	0–2	1–4	2–4	1–3	3–4		0–3	0–4	0–8	0–3	0–1	1–3	1–3	2–1	3–1	2–2
Fraserburgh	1–1	2–2	5–0	1–2	4–1	2–1	3–0	6–1		0–1	1–2	0–3	2–1	2–2	5–1	2–2	3–4	2–1
Huntly	3–1	3–0	4–3	1–3	0–3	1–2	3–2	3–0	3–2		2–6	1–3	0–1	2–4	5–1	2–0	2–2	1–4
Inverurie Loco Works	0–2	0–4	4–0	0–1	2–1	3–2	3–1	4–1	2–0	0–0		2–0	6–1	4–0	3–2	4–2	1–0	4–0
Keith	5–1	2–0	3–1	2–2	0–1	2–1	2–2	8–0	3–1	2–2	5–1		3–2	2–3	5–2	4–0	5–3	3–1
Lossiemouth	1–2	1–2	3–2	0–0	3–0	2–3	4–0	3–1	0–0	1–1	3–0	3–0		2–1	2–1	2–2	3–3	0–5
Nairn County	5–0	1–1	3–2	0–5	3–3	1–0	1–2	7–1	3–2	6–1	2–2	4–0	2–0		3–0	3–1	5–2	3–3
Rothes	2–1	0–1	2–6	1–3	2–5	1–2	0–2	3–3	3–5	3–2	0–2	2–4	1–2	0–4		5–0	0–0	0–5
Strathspey Thistle	0–2	0–7	0–3	0–4	1–6	1–2	2–3	3–3	3–5	3–1	1–5	3–5	1–2	0–3	1–2		0–5	3–2
Turriff United	4–0	1–2	5–1	2–2	0–5	5–1	2–0	6–0	2–2	4–3	1–1	4–1	6–0	1–1	2–1	9–1		3–1
Wick Academy	2–3	1–4	2–2	4–1	1–3	1–3	1–0	8–1	2–0	1–2	2–1	3–5	3–2	0–4	1–0	5–1	2–5	

Updated to match(es) played on 31 May 2011. Source: Highland Football League
Legend: Blue = home team win; Yellow = draw; Red = away team win.
