= 1990–91 Highland Football League =

Highland League
- Season: 1990–1991
- Champions: Ross County

The 1990–1991 Highland Football League was won by Ross County.

== Table ==
Pos	Team	Pld	W	D	L	GF	GA	GD	Pts
1	Ross County (C)	34	24	4	6	91	37	+54	76
2	Caledonian	34	23	4	7	87	40	+47	73
3	Cove Rangers	34	23	2	9	95	52	+43	71
4	Forres Mechanics	34	22	3	9	77	49	+28	69
5	Inverness Thistle	34	20	5	9	55	39	+16	65
6	Huntly	34	17	10	7	79	52	+27	61
7	Elgin City	34	17	6	11	84	53	+31	57
8	Peterhead	34	13	11	10	50	45	+5	50
9	Brora Rangers	34	13	10	11	66	54	+12	49
10	Lossiemouth	34	14	5	15	69	61	+8	47
11	Buckie Thistle	34	12	7	15	47	52	−5	43
12	Fort William	34	11	10	13	76	85	−9	43
13	Fraserburgh	34	11	8	15	54	56	−2	41
14	Keith	34	11	4	19	37	55	−18	37
15	Deveronvale	34	7	9	18	38	91	−53	30
16	Clachnacuddin	34	8	2	24	42	92	−50	26
17	Nairn County	34	4	3	27	36	104	−68	15
18	Rothes	34	2	5	27	36	102	−66	11

Source: Scottish Football Historical Archive - Highland League Final Tables
Rules for classification: 1) points; 2) goal difference; 3) number of goals scored.
(C) Champions
