= 1995–96 Highland Football League =

Scottish football season

Highland League
- Season: 1995–1996
- Champions: Huntly

The 1995–1996 Highland Football League was won by Huntly.

== Table ==
Pos	Team	Pld	W	D	L	GF	GA	GD	Pts
1	Huntly (C)	30	27	0	3	103	34	+69	81
2	Cove Rangers	30	20	5	5	74	35	+39	65
3	Lossiemouth	30	18	3	9	55	37	+18	57
4	Peterhead	30	16	7	7	74	51	+23	55
5	Fraserburgh	30	14	9	7	85	46	+39	51
6	Keith	30	14	6	10	59	40	+19	48
7	Elgin City	30	15	3	12	59	55	+4	48
8	Brora Rangers	30	12	5	13	40	50	−10	41
9	Deveronvale	30	12	3	15	47	53	−6	39
10	Wick Academy	30	11	5	14	42	63	−21	38
11	Clachnacuddin	30	9	7	14	45	51	−6	34
12	Buckie Thistle	30	8	8	14	45	61	−16	32
13	Forres Mechanics	30	6	8	16	38	51	−13	26
14	Fort William	30	8	2	20	27	72	−45	26
15	Rothes	30	4	8	18	39	74	−35	20
16	Nairn County	30	4	5	21	26	85	−59	17

Source: Scottish Football Historical Archive - Highland League Final Tables
Rules for classification: 1) points; 2) goal difference; 3) number of goals scored.
(C) Champions
