= 2017–18 Highland Football League =

Press & Journal Highland League
- Season: 2017–18
- Dates: 29 July 2017 – 5 May 2018
- Champions: Cove Rangers (6th title)
- Matches: 306
- Goals: 1,306 (4.27 per match)
- Biggest home win: Brora Rangers 16–0 Fort William (2 December 2017)
- Biggest away win: Fort William 0–10 Fraserburgh (9 September 2017); Fort William 2–12 Cove Rangers (31 March 2018)
- Highest scoring: Brora Rangers 16–0 Fort William (2 December 2017)
- Longest winning run: 11 matches: Formartine United
- Longest unbeaten run: 31 matches: Cove Rangers
- Longest winless run: 34 matches: Fort William
- Longest losing run: 13 matches: Fort William
- All statistics correct as of 5 May 2018.

The 2017–18 Highland Football League (known as the Press & Journal Highland League for sponsorship reasons) was the 115th season of the Highland Football League, and the 4th season as the fifth tier of the Scottish football pyramid system. The season began on 29 July 2017 and ended on 5 May 2018. Buckie Thistle were the defending champions.

The previous season's runners-up Cove Rangers won their sixth Highland Football League title after beating Clachnacuddin 5–0 on 7 April 2018. At the time, they were unbeaten with 26 wins from their 29 matches. They defeated the winners of the 2017–18 Lowland Football League (Spartans) in the League Two play-offs semi-finals, but lost to Cowdenbeath 3–2 on aggregate in the final.

== Teams ==
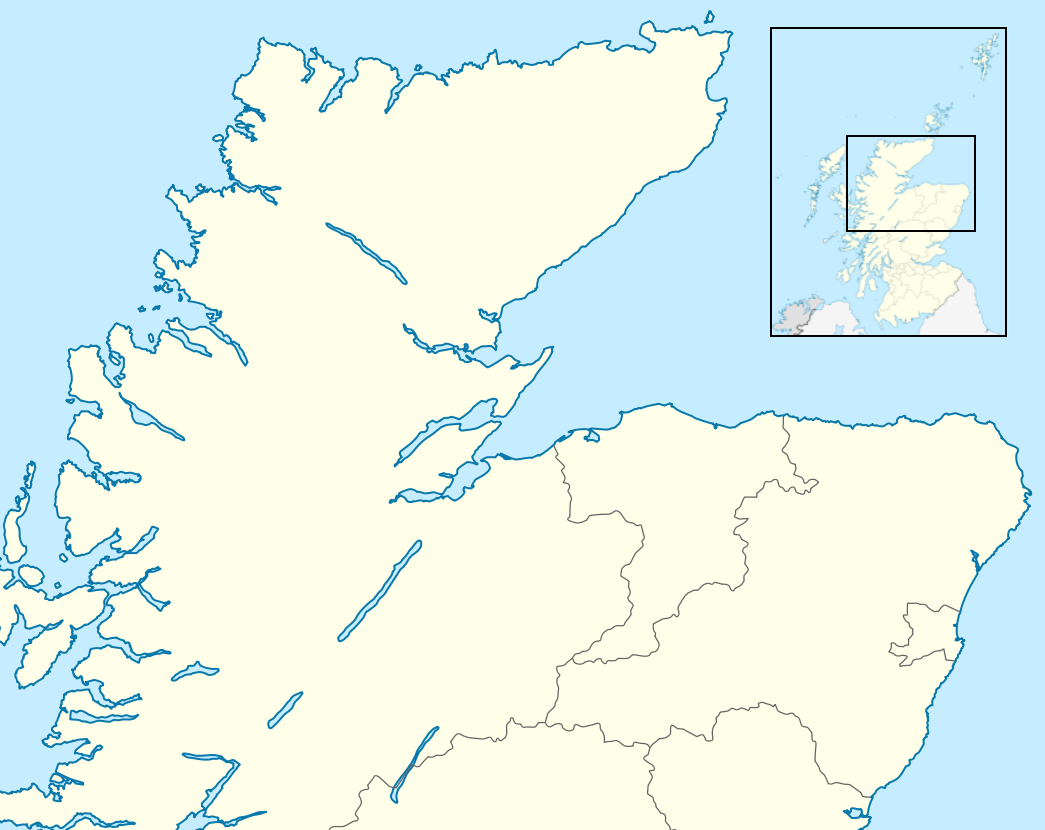
Location of teams in 2017–18 Highland Football League

All grounds are equipped with floodlights as required by league regulations.

Team	Location	Stadium	Capacity	Seats
Brora Rangers	Brora	Dudgeon Park	4,000	200
Buckie Thistle	Buckie	Victoria Park	5,000	400
Clachnacuddin	Inverness	Grant Street Park	3,000	154
Cove Rangers	Inverurie	Harlaw Park	2,500	250
Deveronvale	Banff	Princess Royal Park	2,600	360
Formartine United	Pitmedden	North Lodge Park	2,500	300
Forres Mechanics	Forres	Mosset Park	2,700	502
Fort William	Fort William	Claggan Park	4,000	400
Fraserburgh	Fraserburgh	Bellslea Park	3,000	480
Huntly	Huntly	Christie Park	2,200	270
Inverurie Loco Works	Inverurie	Harlaw Park	2,500	250
Keith	Keith	Kynoch Park	4,000	370
Lossiemouth	Lossiemouth	Grant Park	3,250	250
Nairn County	Nairn	Station Park	2,250	250
Rothes	Rothes	Mackessack Park	2,700	184
Strathspey Thistle	Grantown-on-Spey	Seafield Park	1,600	150
Turriff United	Turriff	The Haughs	2,135	135
Wick Academy	Wick	Harmsworth Park	2,412	102

== League table ==
Pos	Team	Pld	W	D	L	GF	GA	GD	Pts	Promotion or qualification
1	Cove Rangers (C)	34	29	3	2	127	22	+105	90	Qualification to League Two play-off semi-finals
2	Formartine United	34	26	1	7	124	41	+83	79	
3	Inverurie Loco Works	34	25	3	6	104	37	+67	78	
4	Fraserburgh	34	23	4	7	101	38	+63	73	
5	Forres Mechanics	34	23	4	7	88	45	+43	73	
6	Brora Rangers	34	20	3	11	87	39	+48	63	
7	Buckie Thistle	34	15	6	13	80	56	+24	51	
8	Deveronvale	34	16	3	15	73	76	−3	51	
9	Nairn County	34	16	3	15	61	71	−10	51	
10	Rothes	34	15	4	15	77	70	+7	49	
11	Huntly	34	15	4	15	66	81	−15	49	
12	Wick Academy	34	12	10	12	67	54	+13	46	
13	Clachnacuddin	34	11	8	15	54	69	−15	41	
14	Turriff United	34	11	4	19	54	70	−16	37	
15	Keith	34	4	4	26	45	104	−59	16	
16	Lossiemouth	34	4	3	27	41	125	−84	15	
17	Strathspey Thistle	34	4	2	28	26	124	−98	14	
18	Fort William	34	0	5	29	31	184	−153	5	

Source: Highland Football League
Rules for classification: 1) Points; 2) Goal difference; 3) Number of goals scored
(C) Champions

== Results ==
Home \ Away	BROR	BUCK	CLAC	COVE	DEVE	FORM	FORR	FORT	FRAS	HUNT	LOCO	KEITH	LOSS	NAIRN	ROTH	STRA	TURR	WICK
Brora Rangers		3–0	2–1	0–1	3–0	0–5	3–0	16–0	1–3	1–0	1–2	3–0	7–0	3–0	2–0	3–0	3–2	2–2
Buckie Thistle	2–2		1–0	0–2	2–3	3–0	1–1	5–0	4–1	4–1	1–3	4–1	6–0	2–3	3–0	1–2	0–0	1–3
Clachnacuddin	3–2	1–1		0–4	3–3	1–3	0–2	2–1	1–2	6–3	0–4	2–1	2–1	3–0	1–0	6–0	0–1	0–0
Cove Rangers	1–0	7–1	5–0		4–1	3–2	0–1	8–0	1–1	5–0	4–0	6–2	2–0	0–3	2–0	3–1	5–1	1–1
Deveronvale	2–3	2–1	3–1	2–3		0–5	0–3	5–0	1–4	4–1	0–2	4–1	2–1	2–1	2–2	4–0	3–4	3–1
Formartine United	3–2	5–0	2–4	0–4	4–4		4–1	12–0	1–0	1–2	5–0	2–0	6–1	5–0	5–0	4–0	3–0	2–1
Forres Mechanics	3–2	1–0	4–1	0–2	3–0	1–4		4–1	2–3	2–3	2–0	5–0	5–0	1–0	3–1	4–1	2–1	2–1
Fort William	0–4	0–7	1–1	2–12	1–5	0–6	1–9		0–10	1–4	1–5	3–3	3–4	0–2	3–4	1–5	3–7	2–2
Fraserburgh	1–1	2–2	4–0	0–1	7–3	0–1	6–1	7–0		7–0	3–1	1–2	2–0	4–1	4–2	3–0	4–0	3–1
Huntly	1–0	1–2	2–2	1–3	1–3	1–2	0–6	4–0	0–2		1–7	5–1	1–1	2–3	3–0	5–1	5–2	3–2
Inverurie Loco Works	2–1	3–0	3–0	1–2	5–1	3–1	0–0	4–0	2–2	6–0		3–2	9–1	4–1	4–0	5–0	0–0	5–1
Keith	0–1	2–5	0–3	0–5	0–2	1–5	3–5	2–1	0–3	1–2	0–3		3–3	2–2	0–3	6–1	1–2	1–1
Lossiemouth	0–2	0–3	2–3	0–7	1–3	0–6	1–3	2–2	1–5	0–2	2–4	3–2		2–3	4–6	3–2	3–0	1–2
Nairn County	0–1	4–1	1–1	0–8	3–0	1–2	2–4	1–0	3–1	2–5	2–3	2–1	6–2		2–4	1–0	3–0	3–2
Rothes	3–1	0–4	6–2	1–1	2–0	3–4	2–2	9–1	0–1	2–2	2–0	3–2	6–0	4–1		3–0	2–5	1–0
Strathspey Thistle	0–7	0–6	2–2	0–8	1–3	0–8	0–3	1–1	1–4	0–2	0–7	2–3	3–2	0–2	0–5		1–2	0–3
Turriff United	0–2	2–2	1–0	0–4	1–3	2–4	1–2	6–2	0–1	1–2	0–1	7–2	1–0	1–2	1–0	1–2		1–2
Wick Academy	2–3	1–5	2–2	1–3	2–0	3–2	1–1	6–0	4–0	1–1	1–3	2–0	6–0	1–1	5–1	3–0	1–1	

Updated to match(es) played on 5 May 2018. Source: highlandfootballleague.com
Legend: Blue = home team win; Yellow = draw; Red = away team win.

== Promotion play-offs ==
A number of postponements over the winter period resulted in fixture congestion later in the season. As a champion could not be crowned in time, the dates for the semi-finals were pushed back a week. Cove Rangers played 2017–18 Lowland Football League champions Spartans in the League Two play-off, winning 4–0 at home in the first leg. Cove went through on with a 5–2 aggregate win despite losing the second leg 2–1.

This set up a final against Cowdenbeath. The first leg at Harlaw Park finished 0–0 before Cove lost 3–2 in the second leg at Central Park, meaning that Cowdenbeath were victorious on aggregate and retained their place in League Two. Cove would remain in the Highland League.
