= 1993–94 Highland Football League =

Highland League
- Season: 1993–1994
- Champions: Huntly

The 1993–1994 Highland Football League was won by Huntly. This was the final season that Ross County, Caledonian and Inverness Thistle competed.

== Table ==
Pos	Team	Pld	W	D	L	GF	GA	GD	Pts	Qualification
1	Huntly (C)	34	27	4	3	95	21	+74	85	
2	Caledonian	34	20	7	7	80	44	+36	67	Merged with Inverness Thistle and admitted to Scottish Third Division
3	Ross County	34	21	4	9	80	51	+29	67	Admitted to Scottish Third Division
4	Cove Rangers	34	20	4	10	89	46	+43	64	
5	Lossiemouth	34	19	6	9	74	45	+29	63	
6	Elgin City	34	19	6	9	60	33	+27	63	
7	Keith	34	16	6	12	57	40	+17	54	
8	Buckie Thistle	34	16	6	12	54	48	+6	54	
9	Fraserburgh	34	15	8	11	52	36	+16	53	
10	Brora Rangers	34	13	9	12	60	61	−1	48	
11	Peterhead	34	12	8	14	55	56	−1	44	
12	Clachnacuddin	34	11	7	16	49	60	−11	40	
13	Forres Mechanics	34	11	6	17	56	67	−11	39	
14	Deveronvale	34	7	8	19	46	84	−38	29	
15	Inverness Thistle	34	6	9	19	38	62	−24	27	Merged with Caledonian and admitted to Scottish Third Division
16	Fort William	34	8	3	23	26	78	−52	27	
17	Nairn County	34	6	3	25	30	114	−84	21	
18	Rothes	34	4	6	24	42	97	−55	18	

Rules for classification: 1) points; 2) goal difference; 3) number of goals scored.
(C) Champions
