= 1999–2000 Highland Football League =

Highland League
- Season: 1999–2000
- Champions: Keith
- Goals: 876
- Average goals/game: 3.65

The 1999–2000 Highland Football League was won by Keith. Fort William finished bottom.

== Table ==
| Pos | Team | Pld | W | D | L | GF | GA | GD | Pts | Qualification |
|---|---|---|---|---|---|---|---|---|---|---|
| 1 | Keith (C) | 30 | 21 | 3 | 6 | 76 | 38 | +38 | 66 | |
| 2 | Fraserburgh | 30 | 17 | 10 | 3 | 75 | 32 | +43 | 61 | |
| 3 | Buckie Thistle | 30 | 18 | 7 | 5 | 58 | 31 | +27 | 61 | |
| 4 | Peterhead | 30 | 18 | 4 | 8 | 66 | 39 | +27 | 58 | Admitted to Scottish Third Division |
| 5 | Huntly | 30 | 15 | 7 | 8 | 69 | 46 | +23 | 52 | |
| 6 | Forres Mechanics | 30 | 15 | 7 | 8 | 60 | 42 | +18 | 52 | |
| 7 | Clachnacuddin | 30 | 14 | 6 | 10 | 55 | 37 | +18 | 48 | |
| 8 | Cove Rangers | 30 | 12 | 6 | 12 | 81 | 54 | +27 | 42 | |
| 9 | Elgin City | 30 | 12 | 6 | 12 | 45 | 44 | +1 | 42 | Admitted to Scottish Third Division |
| 10 | Lossiemouth | 30 | 12 | 6 | 12 | 52 | 56 | −4 | 42 | |
| 11 | Deveronvale | 30 | 11 | 5 | 14 | 51 | 63 | −12 | 38 | |
| 12 | Brora Rangers | 30 | 9 | 6 | 15 | 53 | 61 | −8 | 33 | |
| 13 | Rothes | 30 | 8 | 5 | 17 | 41 | 52 | −11 | 29 | |
| 14 | Wick Academy | 30 | 6 | 5 | 19 | 36 | 84 | −48 | 23 | |
| 15 | Nairn County | 30 | 3 | 8 | 19 | 24 | 91 | −67 | 17 | |
| 16 | Fort William | 30 | 1 | 5 | 24 | 34 | 107 | −73 | 8 | |

Source: Scottish Football Historical Archive - Highland League Final Tables
Rules for classification: 1) points; 2) goal difference; 3) number of goals scored.
(C) Champions
