= 1992–93 Highland Football League =

Highland League
- Season: 1992–1993
- Champions: withheld

The 1992–1993 Highland Football League was won by Elgin City, who were later stripped of the title after requesting a game be brought forward, resulting in two players —who would have been ineligible— being allowed to play. Therefore, the title was declared void although it really should have been awarded to Caledonian.

== Table ==
Pos	Team	Pld	W	D	L	GF	GA	GD	Pts
1	Elgin City	34	24	5	5	110	35	+75	77
2	Cove Rangers	34	23	4	7	78	37	+41	73
3	Lossiemouth	34	21	6	7	104	54	+50	69
4	Caledonian	34	21	6	7	76	41	+35	69
5	Ross County	34	19	7	8	87	49	+38	64
6	Huntly	34	19	5	10	96	55	+41	62
7	Clachnacuddin	34	17	7	10	47	34	+13	58
8	Inverness Thistle	34	17	6	11	55	50	+5	57
9	Buckie Thistle	34	17	4	13	62	55	+7	55
10	Fraserburgh	34	15	7	12	63	52	+11	52
11	Deveronvale	34	14	4	16	57	71	−14	46
12	Keith	34	12	9	13	46	59	−13	45
13	Brora Rangers	34	11	8	15	72	74	−2	41
14	Peterhead	34	8	10	16	61	80	−19	34
15	Rothes	34	4	8	22	42	104	−62	20
16	Fort William	34	5	4	25	37	89	−52	19
17	Forres Mechanics	34	4	6	24	40	94	−54	18
18	Nairn County	34	1	2	31	26	126	−100	5

Source: Scottish Football Historical Archive - Highland League Final Tables
Rules for classification: 1) points; 2) goal difference; 3) number of goals scored.
