= 1989–90 Highland Football League =

Highland League
- Season: 1989–1990
- Champions: Elgin City
- Matches: 306
- Goals: 1,142 (3.73 per match)

The 1989–1990 Highland Football League was won by Elgin City. Clachnacuddin finished bottom.

== Teams ==
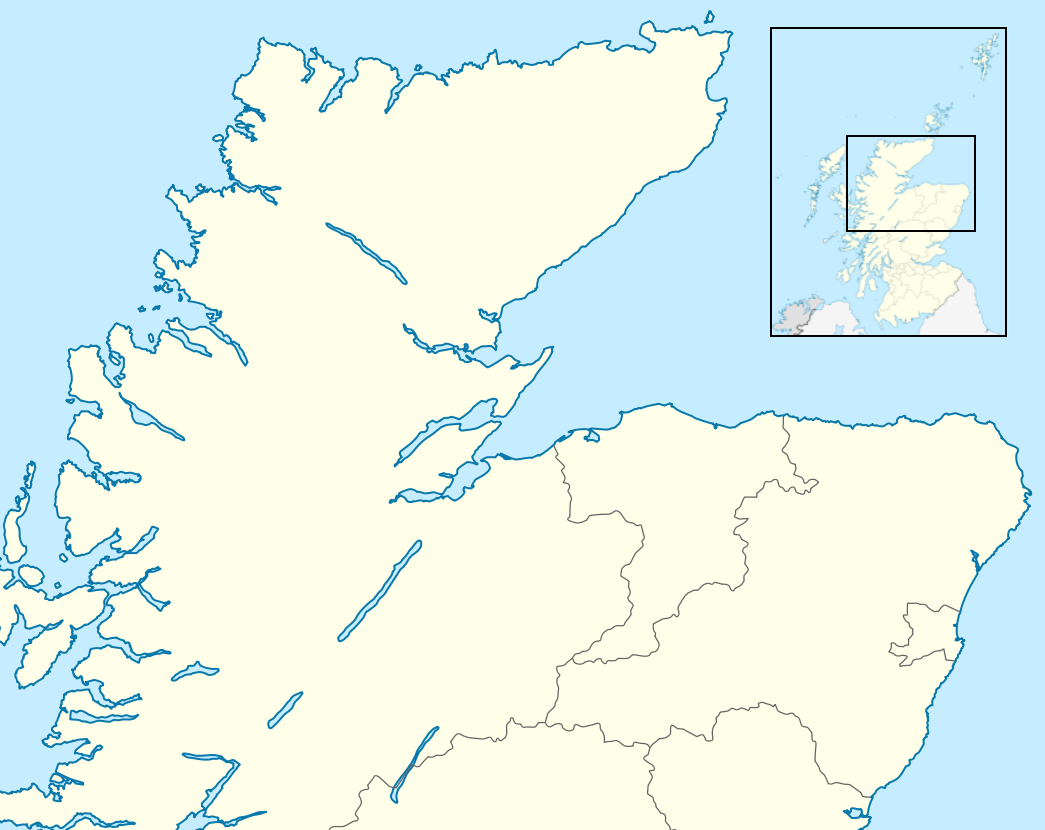
Location of teams in 1989–90 Highland Football League

== Table ==
Pos	Team	Pld	W	D	L	GF	GA	GD	Pts
1	Elgin City (C)	34	26	3	5	103	33	+70	81
2	Caledonian	34	23	7	4	103	35	+68	76
3	Peterhead	34	23	4	7	77	35	+42	73
4	Inverness Thistle	34	23	4	7	69	31	+38	73
5	Forres Mechanics	34	20	5	9	79	53	+26	65
6	Cove Rangers	34	17	8	9	72	59	+13	59
7	Fraserburgh	34	17	6	11	58	51	+7	57
8	Huntly	34	17	5	12	72	46	+26	56
9	Lossiemouth	34	15	5	14	77	67	+10	50
10	Buckie Thistle	34	14	7	13	63	53	+10	49
11	Ross County	34	13	5	16	54	54	0	44
12	Keith	34	11	8	15	49	45	+4	41
13	Fort William	34	12	4	18	59	73	−14	40
14	Brora Rangers	34	9	6	19	52	80	−28	33
15	Nairn County	34	9	6	19	51	90	−39	33
16	Deveronvale	34	6	2	26	42	102	−60	20
17	Rothes	34	4	6	24	36	84	−48	18
18	Clachnacuddin	34	0	3	31	26	151	−125	3

Source: Scottish Football Historical Archive - Highland League Final Tables
Rules for classification: 1) points; 2) goal difference; 3) number of goals scored.
(C) Champions
