= 1987–88 Highland Football League =

Highland League
- Season: 1987–1988
- Champions: Caledonian
- Matches: 306
- Goals: 1,093 (3.57 per match)

The 1987–1988 Highland Football League was won again by Caledonian F.C. Nairn County F.C. finished last.

== Teams ==
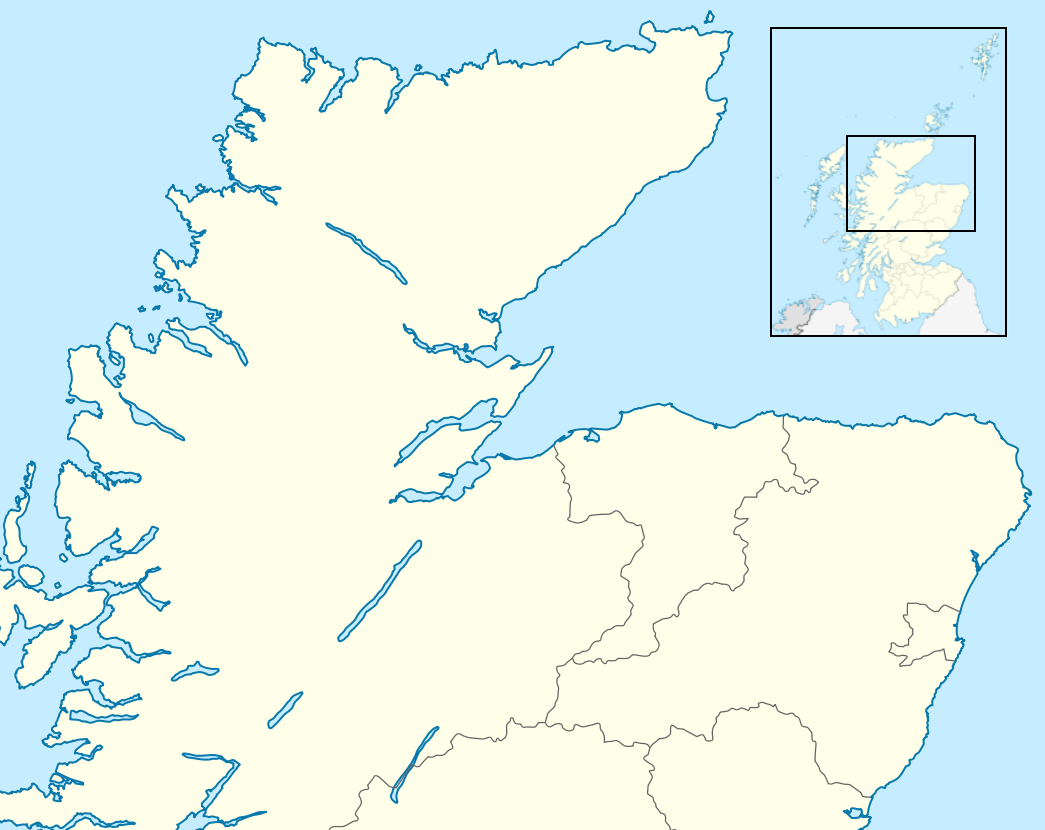
Location of teams in 1987–88 Highland Football League

== Table ==
Pos	Team	Pld	W	D	L	GF	GA	GD	Pts
1	Caledonian (C)	34	23	5	6	97	40	+57	74
2	Buckie Thistle	34	22	6	6	80	30	+50	72
3	Peterhead	34	22	5	7	68	40	+28	71
4	Inverness Thistle	34	19	7	8	69	42	+27	64
5	Keith	34	20	2	12	81	49	+32	62
6	Forres Mechanics	34	20	2	12	70	40	+30	62
7	Elgin City	34	17	8	9	69	41	+28	59
8	Ross County	34	19	2	13	67	39	+28	59
9	Huntly	34	16	9	9	60	44	+16	57
10	Cove Rangers	34	14	10	10	67	54	+13	52
11	Deveronvale	34	12	10	12	64	70	−6	46
12	Brora Rangers	34	12	5	17	49	69	−20	41
13	Fraserburgh	34	9	6	19	37	71	−34	33
14	Clachnacuddin	34	8	5	21	53	93	−40	29
15	Rothes	34	8	5	21	51	94	−43	29
16	Lossiemouth	34	8	4	22	38	78	−40	28
17	Fort William	34	6	3	25	43	89	−46	21
18	Nairn County	34	1	6	27	30	110	−80	9

Rules for classification: 1) points; 2) goal difference; 3) number of goals scored.
(C) Champions
