= 2001–02 Highland Football League =

Highland League
- Season: 2001–02
- Champions: Fraserburgh
- Goals: 711
- Average goals/game: 3.39

The 2001–02 Highland Football League was won by Fraserburgh. Rothes finished bottom. Inverurie Loco Works joined the Highland League this season, increasing the number of teams from 14 to 15.

== Table ==
Pos	Team	Pld	W	D	L	GF	GA	GD	Pts
1	Fraserburgh (C)	28	20	4	4	71	36	+35	64
2	Deveronvale	28	19	4	5	68	27	+41	61
3	Buckie Thistle	28	15	8	5	51	27	+24	53
4	Clachnacuddin	28	13	10	5	60	39	+21	49
5	Keith	28	14	5	9	57	37	+20	47
6	Cove Rangers	28	12	7	9	72	60	+12	43
7	Inverurie Loco Works	28	12	4	12	48	43	+5	40
8	Brora Rangers	28	12	4	12	47	55	−8	40
9	Huntly	28	11	6	11	46	36	+10	39
10	Forres Mechanics	28	9	10	9	49	46	+3	37
11	Lossiemouth	28	9	6	13	23	40	−17	33
12	Nairn County	28	6	8	14	45	61	−16	26
13	Fort William	28	7	2	19	30	62	−32	23
14	Wick Academy	28	5	4	19	20	59	−39	19
15	Rothes	28	2	6	20	24	83	−59	12

Source: Scottish Football Historical Archive - Highland League Final Tables
Rules for classification: 1) points; 2) goal difference; 3) number of goals scored.
(C) Champions
