= 1988–89 Highland Football League =

Highland League
- Season: 1988–1989
- Champions: Peterhead
- Matches: 306
- Goals: 1,042 (3.41 per match)

The 1988–1989 Highland Football League was won by Peterhead. Fort William finished bottom.

== Teams ==
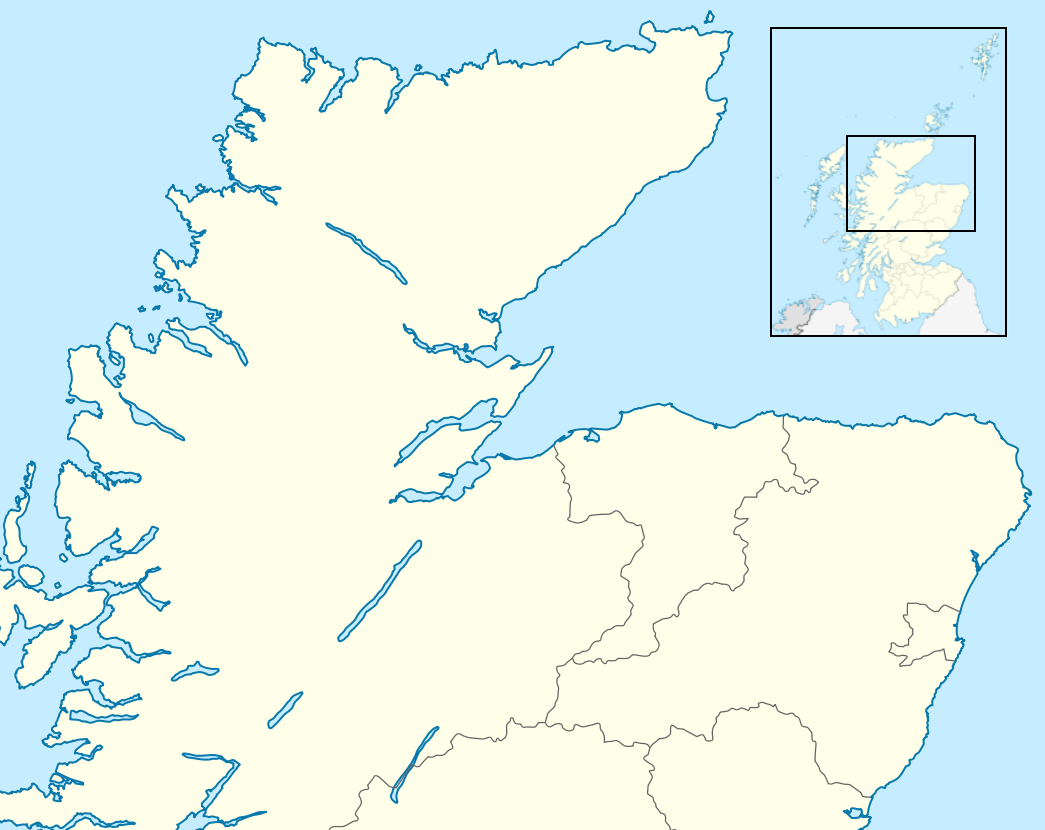
Location of teams in 1988–89 Highland Football League

== Table ==
Pos	Team	Pld	W	D	L	GF	GA	GD	Pts
1	Peterhead (C)	34	22	8	4	79	35	+44	74
2	Cove Rangers	34	21	6	7	71	38	+33	69
3	Huntly	34	20	6	8	82	40	+42	66
4	Inverness Thistle	34	19	9	6	70	29	+41	66
5	Elgin City	34	19	9	6	73	37	+36	66
6	Forres Mechanics	34	19	8	7	66	34	+32	65
7	Keith	34	19	8	7	61	32	+29	65
8	Ross County	34	18	3	13	61	51	+10	57
9	Buckie Thistle	34	16	6	12	66	53	+13	54
10	Caledonian	34	14	11	9	70	42	+28	53
11	Fraserburgh	34	15	8	11	52	43	+9	53
12	Lossiemouth	34	10	8	16	54	66	−12	38
13	Deveronvale	34	8	7	19	44	80	−36	31
14	Brora Rangers	34	8	2	24	42	67	−25	26
15	Nairn County	34	5	8	21	49	102	−53	23
16	Clachnacuddin	34	5	5	24	34	89	−55	20
17	Rothes	34	5	4	25	44	104	−60	19
18	Fort William	34	3	4	27	24	100	−76	13

Source: Scottish Football Historical Archive - Highland League Final Tables
Rules for classification: 1) points; 2) goal difference; 3) number of goals scored.
(C) Champions
