= 1986–87 Highland Football League =

Highland League
- Season: 1986–1987
- Champions: Inverness Thistle
- Matches: 306
- Goals: 1,135 (3.71 per match)

The 1986–1987 Highland Football League was expanded to eighteen teams when Cove Rangers, formerly of the North Juniors was elected in. The first day of the season saw Caledonian beat Deveronvale 12-0 at Telford Street Park.

It was won by Inverness Thistle, and Ross County finished bottom.

== Teams ==
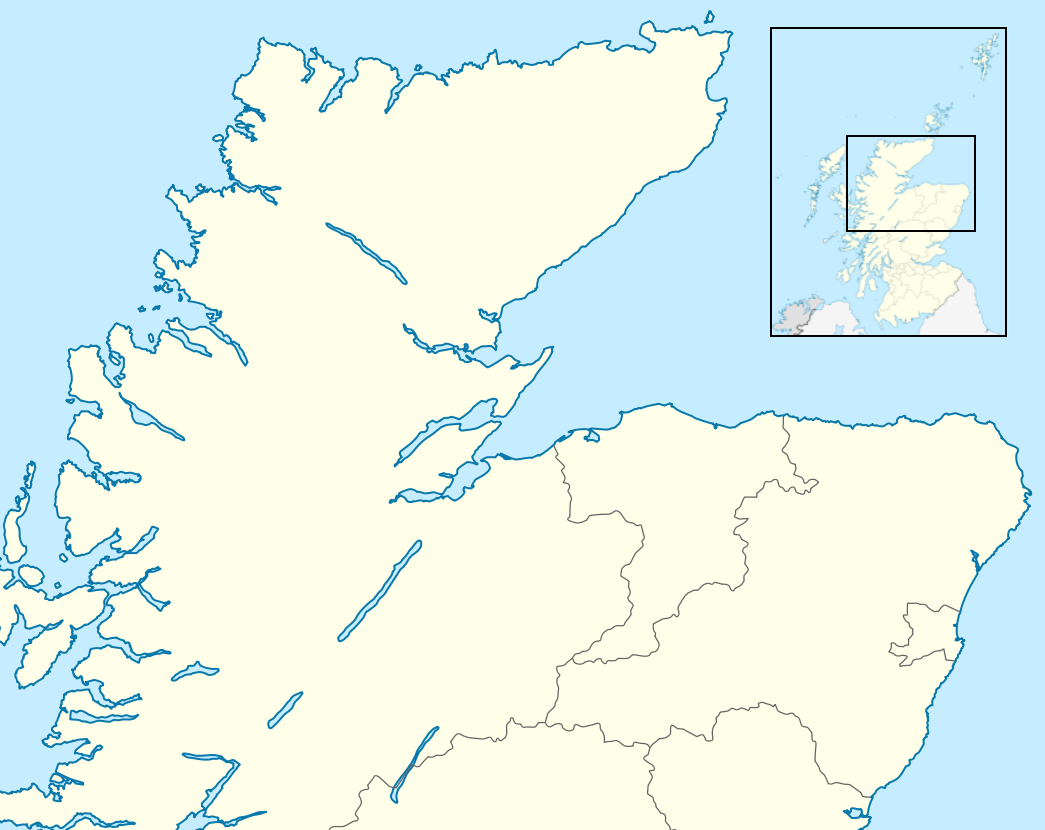
Location of teams in 1986–87 Highland Football League

== Table ==
| Pos | Team | Pld | W | D | L | GF | GA | GD | Pts |
|---|---|---|---|---|---|---|---|---|---|
| 1 | Inverness Thistle (C) | 34 | 27 | 6 | 1 | 96 | 30 | +66 | 87 |
| 2 | Caledonian | 34 | 25 | 6 | 3 | 114 | 31 | +83 | 81 |
| 3 | Elgin City | 34 | 21 | 7 | 6 | 93 | 33 | +60 | 70 |
| 4 | Keith | 34 | 21 | 6 | 7 | 89 | 39 | +50 | 69 |
| 5 | Buckie Thistle | 34 | 20 | 8 | 6 | 84 | 37 | +47 | 68 |
| 6 | Forres Mechanics | 34 | 18 | 9 | 7 | 53 | 34 | +19 | 63 |
| 7 | Peterhead | 34 | 18 | 7 | 9 | 67 | 45 | +22 | 61 |
| 8 | Cove Rangers | 34 | 17 | 6 | 11 | 79 | 58 | +21 | 57 |
| 9 | Huntly | 34 | 16 | 6 | 12 | 60 | 63 | −3 | 54 |
| 10 | Lossiemouth | 34 | 10 | 7 | 17 | 54 | 77 | −23 | 37 |
| 11 | Fort William | 34 | 9 | 6 | 19 | 44 | 76 | −32 | 33 |
| 12 | Nairn County | 34 | 9 | 6 | 19 | 48 | 92 | −44 | 33 |
| 13 | Fraserburgh | 34 | 9 | 5 | 20 | 48 | 63 | −15 | 32 |
| 14 | Rothes | 34 | 10 | 2 | 22 | 54 | 99 | −45 | 32 |
| 15 | Brora Rangers | 34 | 7 | 6 | 21 | 43 | 86 | −43 | 27 |
| 16 | Clachnacuddin | 34 | 6 | 4 | 24 | 42 | 84 | −42 | 22 |
| 17 | Deveronvale | 34 | 6 | 4 | 24 | 36 | 96 | −60 | 22 |
| 18 | Ross County | 34 | 5 | 3 | 26 | 31 | 92 | −61 | 18 |

Source: Scottish Football Historical Archive - Highland League Final Tables
Rules for classification: 1) points; 2) goal difference; 3) number of goals scored.
(C) Champions
