= 2025–26 Highland Football League =

Breedon Highland League
- Season: 2025–26
- Dates: 26 July 2025 – 18 April 2026
- Champions: Brora Rangers
- Matches: 306
- Goals: 1,016 (3.32 per match)
- Biggest home win: Buckie Thistle 8–0 Rothes (17 January 2026)
- Biggest away win: Strathspey Thistle 0–8 Brora Rangers (10 September 2025)
- Highest scoring: Rothes 1–8 Brechin City (9 August 2025); Brora Rangers 8–1 Deveronvale (14 March 2026)
- Longest winning run: 7 matches: 3 teams
- Longest unbeaten run: 13 matches: Formartine United
- Longest winless run: 22 matches: Rothes
- Longest losing run: 11 matches: Rothes
- All statistics correct as of 18 April 2026.

The 2025–26 Highland Football League (known as the Breedon Highland League for sponsorship reasons) was the 123rd season of the Highland Football League, and the 12th season as part of the fifth tier of the Scottish football pyramid system. Brora Rangers were the reigning champions.

For the fifth season in a row, the title race came down to the final full round of fixtures, as Brora Rangers and Brechin City entered their games separated by goal difference. Neither side won their final match, but in the end Brora Rangers clinched the championship by one point following their 1–1 draw at Huntly, while Brechin City lost 4–1 at Turriff United.

Brora Rangers ultimately remained in the Highland League, losing 3–1 on aggregate to Edinburgh City in the League Two play-off final.

Due to restructuring of the Lowland League for the 2026–27 season into two 16-team divisions, Brechin City transferred into the Lowland League East as they did not achieve promotion to the SPFL by winning the Highland League and the Pyramid Playoff.

== Teams ==
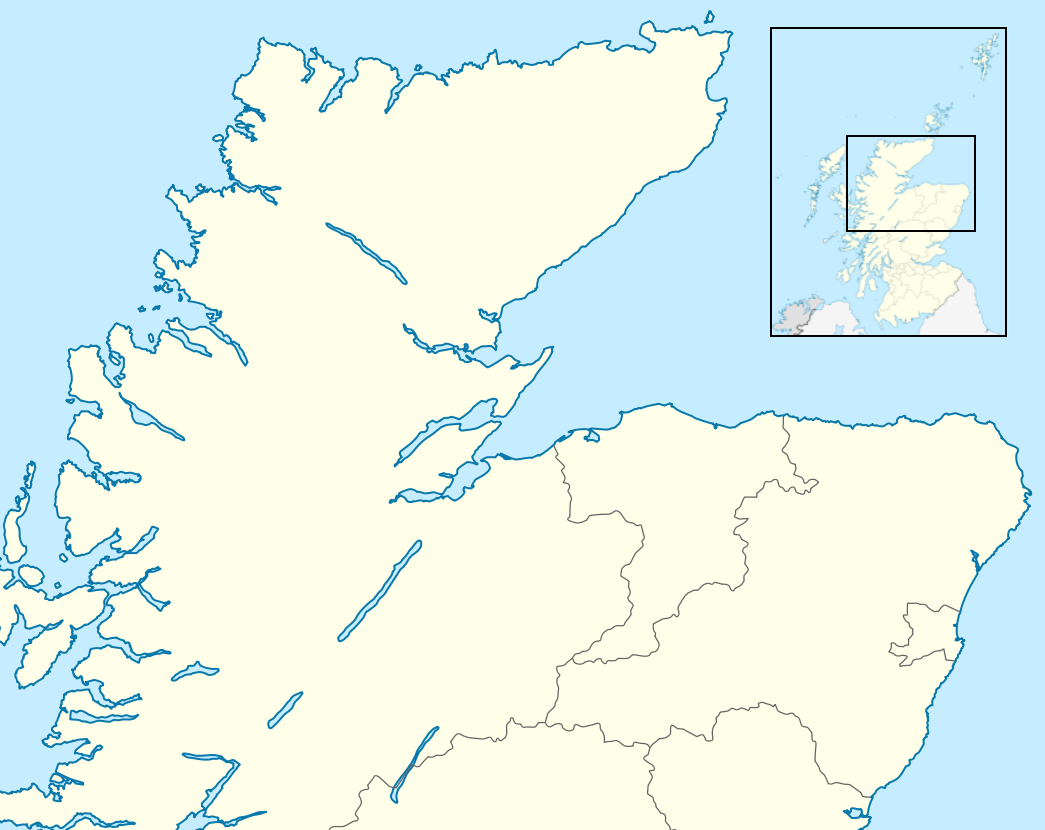
Location of teams in 2025–26 Highland Football League

=== Stadia and locations ===
All grounds are equipped with floodlights as required by league regulations.

Team	Location	Stadium	Capacity	Seats
Banks o' Dee	Aberdeen	Spain Park	876	122
Brechin City	Brechin	Glebe Park	4,083	1,519
Brora Rangers	Brora	Dudgeon Park	2,000	250
Buckie Thistle	Buckie	Victoria Park	3,000	400
Clachnacuddin	Inverness	Grant Street Park	2,074	154
Deveronvale	Banff	Princess Royal Park	2,651	360
Formartine United	Pitmedden	North Lodge Park	1,800	300
Forres Mechanics	Forres	Mosset Park	2,700	502
Fraserburgh	Fraserburgh	Bellslea Park	1,865	480
Huntly	Huntly	Christie Park	2,200	270
Inverurie Loco Works	Inverurie	Harlaw Park	2,500	250
Keith	Keith	Kynoch Park	2,362	370
Lossiemouth	Lossiemouth	Grant Park	2,050	250
Nairn County	Nairn	Station Park	2,250	250
Rothes	Rothes	Mackessack Park	1,731	167
Strathspey Thistle	Grantown-on-Spey	Seafield Park	1,600	150
Turriff United	Turriff	The Haughs	2,135	135
Wick Academy	Wick	Harmsworth Park	2,412	300

== League table ==
Pos	Team	Pld	W	D	L	GF	GA	GD	Pts	Qualification or relegation
1	Brora Rangers (C)	34	23	6	5	97	35	+62	75	Qualification for the Pyramid play-off
2	Brechin City	34	23	5	6	78	23	+55	74	Transfer to Lowland League East
3	Formartine United	34	20	11	3	65	27	+38	71	
4	Fraserburgh	34	21	5	8	75	39	+36	68	
5	Clachnacuddin	34	18	7	9	78	40	+38	61	
6	Banks o' Dee	34	16	10	8	58	35	+23	58	
7	Keith	34	17	7	10	52	47	+5	58	
8	Buckie Thistle	34	16	5	13	62	47	+15	53	
9	Nairn County	34	15	4	15	56	52	+4	49	
10	Turriff United	34	13	9	12	60	50	+10	48	
11	Huntly	34	11	10	13	46	43	+3	43	
12	Forres Mechanics	34	11	7	16	52	67	−15	40	
13	Strathspey Thistle (Note: Strathspey Thistle deducted 3 points for fielding an ineligible player.)	34	13	2	19	49	83	−34	38	
14	Deveronvale	34	11	4	19	46	87	−41	37	
15	Inverurie Loco Works (Note: Inverurie Loco Works deducted 3 points for fielding an ineligible player.)	34	9	6	19	47	66	−19	30	
16	Wick Academy	34	7	7	20	42	65	−23	28	
17	Lossiemouth	34	4	5	25	20	76	−56	17	
18	Rothes	34	1	4	29	33	134	−101	7	

Rules for classification: 1) Points; 2) Goal difference; 3) Number of goals scored
(C) Champions

== Results ==
Home \ Away	BAN	BRE	BRO	BUC	CLA	DEV	FOU	FOM	FRA	HUN	INV	KEI	LOS	NAI	RTH	STR	TUR	WIC
Banks o' Dee		0–2	3–1	1–3	2–3	5–0	1–0	4–1	3–1	1–0	1–0	1–1	5–0	2–1	0–0	3–1	2–2	6–1
Brechin City	1–1		1–0	5–0	1–1	3–0	0–0	6–2	0–1	2–0	4–1	1–1	4–0	3–0	3–0	3–0	3–1	5–1
Brora Rangers	0–1	2–1		4–1	2–1	8–1	1–1	5–0	0–0	1–1	2–0	1–1	2–0	3–1	6–2	7–1	3–0	3–0
Buckie Thistle	1–3	0–3	0–2		1–2	2–3	1–0	2–0	0–1	0–0	2–1	5–0	2–1	1–0	8–0	1–4	0–0	2–0
Clachnacuddin	0–0	0–1	1–2	2–1		1–1	2–2	6–0	2–4	0–1	3–2	1–2	5–0	0–0	7–0	6–0	2–3	1–0
Deveronvale	0–2	0–0	2–4	3–2	2–3		1–3	1–2	1–3	1–0	2–2	3–2	1–0	1–6	2–4	2–1	0–3	3–2
Formartine United	2–0	3–1	3–3	3–1	3–0	1–0		2–1	1–1	0–0	1–0	1–1	3–0	2–0	4–0	4–0	3–1	0–0
Forres Mechanics	1–1	0–1	1–3	0–4	1–1	1–3	1–3		4–1	1–1	4–0	2–2	1–1	1–0	2–0	6–0	0–3	0–2
Fraserburgh	0–1	1–0	3–0	2–2	0–2	5–0	2–2	3–1		3–0	2–2	1–2	5–0	7–0	3–0	4–1	0–2	4–1
Huntly	1–1	0–1	1–1	1–1	3–4	2–0	1–2	2–2	4–0		2–0	1–1	3–1	1–2	3–1	1–3	0–0	1–2
Inverurie Loco Works	2–1	1–2	0–3	2–3	0–5	1–3	0–0	1–4	4–0	0–3		1–0	2–1	4–4	4–0	2–3	1–2	1–1
Keith	3–0	0–5	0–5	0–2	0–2	2–0	2–1	1–0	0–2	2–0	2–0		5–0	2–0	2–1	0–2	0–0	3–2
Lossiemouth	1–0	0–2	1–3	1–1	0–2	1–3	0–0	0–3	0–4	1–2	0–2	0–2		1–3	2–0	1–1	0–2	0–3
Nairn County	2–0	1–4	2–1	0–1	1–0	1–1	1–2	4–0	0–1	1–3	3–0	0–2	1–0		4–0	2–1	3–0	1–1
Rothes	2–2	1–8	1–5	1–4	1–5	2–5	1–5	0–3	2–5	2–5	2–6	1–5	0–3	0–4		3–4	0–5	1–1
Strathspey Thistle	0–3	1–0	0–8	2–1	0–3	3–0	1–2	1–2	0–1	3–0	0–2	3–1	3–2	3–4	3–2		0–4	2–0
Turriff United	1–1	4–1	3–4	0–4	2–2	4–0	2–3	2–2	1–3	1–2	1–3	1–2	1–1	3–2	3–0	1–1		0–1
Wick Academy	1–1	0–1	1–2	0–3	2–3	6–1	1–3	1–3	1–2	2–1	0–0	2–3	0–1	1–2	3–3	2–1	1–2	

Legend: Blue = home team win; Yellow = draw; Red = away team win.

== Highland League play-off ==
Subject to the tier 6 champion clubs meeting the required licensing criteria for promotion, a play-off was scheduled to place between the winners of the North Caledonian Football League (Invergordon) and the North of Scotland Football League (Stonehaven), with the winners then playing the team who finished bottom of the Highland League.

With only Invergordon in possession of an SFA licence, they progressed directly to the two-legged final against Rothes, for what would have been the first final held since 2021–22.

However, the play-off would not take place due to a vacancy in the League as a result of Brechin City leaving the division and Elgin City not being relegated from SPFL League Two; Invergordon were directly promoted to fill the vacancy.
