= 2002–03 Highland Football League =

Highland League
- Season: 2002–03
- Champions: Deveronvale
- Goals: 773
- Average goals/game: 3.68
- Top goalscorer: 49-Ian Murray (Deveronvale)

The 2002–03 Highland Football League was won by Deveronvale. Fort William finished bottom.

== Table ==
Pos	Team	Pld	W	D	L	GF	GA	GD	Pts
1	Deveronvale (C)	28	21	6	1	90	24	+66	69
2	Keith	28	17	1	10	66	35	+31	52
3	Buckie Thistle	28	15	6	7	63	36	+27	51
4	Cove Rangers	28	14	7	7	69	46	+23	49
5	Nairn County	28	13	7	8	67	47	+20	46
6	Fraserburgh	28	14	4	10	61	45	+16	46
7	Clachnacuddin	28	13	4	11	45	50	−5	43
8	Huntly	28	12	5	11	53	42	+11	41
9	Inverurie Loco Works	28	11	7	10	50	50	0	40
10	Lossiemouth	28	12	4	12	41	52	−11	40
11	Forres Mechanics	28	12	2	14	59	61	−2	38
12	Rothes	28	8	5	15	26	50	−24	29
13	Wick Academy	28	8	2	18	33	68	−35	26
14	Brora Rangers	28	3	6	19	30	77	−47	15
15	Fort William	28	2	4	22	20	90	−70	10

Source: Scottish Football Historical Archive - Highland League Final Tables
Rules for classification: 1) points; 2) goal difference; 3) number of goals scored.
(C) Champions
