= 2000–01 Highland Football League =

Highland League
- Season: 2000–01
- Champions: Cove Rangers
- Goals: 622
- Average goals/game: 3.42

The 2000–01 Highland Football League was won by Cove Rangers. Fort William finished bottom. Elgin City & Peterhead left the Highland League to join the Scottish Football League, reducing the number of teams from 16 to 14 this season.

== Table ==
Pos	Team	Pld	W	D	L	GF	GA	GD	Pts
1	Cove Rangers (C)	26	20	3	3	74	32	+42	63
2	Huntly	26	19	2	5	61	29	+32	59
3	Buckie Thistle	26	13	7	6	46	33	+13	46
4	Clachnacuddin	26	13	5	8	47	35	+12	44
5	Keith	26	11	9	6	54	43	+11	42
6	Deveronvale	26	11	8	7	40	32	+8	41
7	Forres Mechanics	26	10	10	6	44	39	+5	40
8	Fraserburgh	26	12	3	11	47	38	+9	39
9	Nairn County	26	8	7	11	44	58	−14	31
10	Wick Academy	26	8	5	13	39	43	−4	29
11	Rothes	26	6	5	15	30	45	−15	23
12	Lossiemouth	26	6	4	16	27	60	−33	22
13	Brora Rangers	26	4	3	19	42	78	−36	15
14	Fort William	26	3	5	18	27	57	−30	14

Source: Scottish Football Historical Archive - Highland League Final Tables
Rules for classification: 1) points; 2) goal difference; 3) number of goals scored.
(C) Champions
