= 2003–04 Highland Football League =

Highland League
- Season: 2003–04
- Champions: Clachnacuddin
- Goals: 799
- Average goals/game: 3.80
- Biggest home win: Huntly 8–0 Fort William
- Biggest away win: Brora Rangers 0–8 Fraserburgh
- Highest scoring: Inverurie Loco Works 8–2 Cove Rangers

The 2003–04 Highland Football League was won by Clachnacuddin. Fort William finished bottom.

== Table ==
Pos	Team	Pld	W	D	L	GF	GA	GD	Pts
1	Clachnacuddin (C)	28	21	3	4	61	25	+36	66
2	Buckie Thistle	28	18	7	3	56	32	+24	61
3	Fraserburgh	28	18	5	5	81	36	+45	59
4	Deveronvale	28	18	1	9	77	41	+36	55
5	Keith	28	17	2	9	70	36	+34	53
6	Huntly	28	16	5	7	73	47	+26	53
7	Inverurie Loco Works	28	13	10	5	76	51	+25	49
8	Forres Mechanics	28	13	4	11	63	49	+14	43
9	Nairn County	28	9	5	14	40	60	−20	32
10	Cove Rangers	28	7	6	15	45	61	−16	27
11	Wick Academy	28	6	5	17	42	65	−23	23
12	Brora Rangers	28	5	6	17	34	70	−36	21
13	Lossiemouth	28	4	8	16	41	74	−33	20
14	Rothes	28	2	9	17	19	62	−43	15
15	Fort William	28	3	4	21	20	89	−69	13

Source: Highland Football League
Rules for classification: 1) points; 2) goal difference; 3) number of goals scored.
(C) Champions

== Results ==
Home \ Away	BRO	BUC	CLA	COV	DEV	FRR	FRT	FRA	HUN	LOC	KEI	LOS	NAI	ROT	WIC
Brora Rangers		1–0	1–2	0–0	1–4	0–4	4–1	0–8	3–3	1–1	1–3	5–2	2–3	0–1	2–1
Buckie Thistle	8–1		1–0	2–2	1–0	2–2	3–1	0–0	0–0	1–3	2–1	3–3	1–0	1–0	2–1
Clachnacuddin	4–2	4–1		1–0	3–0	4–2	2–0	2–1	2–0	3–3	3–1	0–1	3–0	1–0	4–0
Cove Rangers	3–0	1–3	1–2		0–4	1–3	8–1	3–2	0–0	2–2	2–1	4–4	1–0	1–1	3–4
Deveronvale	3–1	0–1	0–2	3–2		7–2	4–1	1–1	2–6	4–2	1–2	5–3	3–0	4–0	3–1
Forres Mechanics	4–1	1–2	0–2	3–0	1–0		5–1	1–2	1–0	1–3	1–3	1–2	0–0	3–1	3–3
Fort William	0–0	0–3	0–3	1–0	0–2	0–4		0–7	0–3	2–4	3–1	1–1	1–2	0–0	1–0
Fraserburgh	4–0	1–2	1–2	3–2	0–4	3–2	5–1		5–1	3–3	2–1	4–0	3–0	5–0	4–2
Huntly	2–2	3–5	3–1	4–2	4–3	2–2	8–0	1–2		4–1	1–2	4–2	6–1	4–1	1–0
Inverurie Loco Works	3–1	3–3	1–1	8–2	0–3	3–1	4–1	1–1	3–4		2–1	2–2	5–1	2–2	6–1
Keith	5–1	0–0	0–1	1–0	4–3	4–0	4–0	0–2	2–3	3–1		5–1	7–0	2–0	4–1
Lossiemouth	1–1	0–2	0–2	1–2	0–4	0–4	4–2	3–4	0–1	1–3	1–4		1–3	0–0	2–1
Nairn County	1–0	3–5	3–1	5–1	1–2	0–3	5–1	2–2	0–1	1–4	1–1	2–2		3–0	1–3
Rothes	1–2	0–3	1–4	0–3	0–5	1–4	1–1	0–2	2–3	0–0	1–4	3–2	1–1		1–1
Wick Academy	2–1	1–2	2–2	2–0	2–3	2–5	2–0	2–4	2–1	1–3	2–3	2–2	0–1	1–1	

Source: Highland Football League
Legend: Blue = home team win; Yellow = draw; Red = away team win.
