= 1998–99 Highland Football League =

Highland League
- Season: 1998–1999
- Champions: Peterhead
- Goals: 981
- Average goals/game: 4.09

The 1998–1999 Highland Football League was won by Peterhead. Fort William finished bottom.

== Table ==
Pos	Team	Pld	W	D	L	GF	GA	GD	Pts
1	Peterhead (C)	30	24	4	2	89	19	+70	76
2	Huntly	30	23	3	4	86	38	+48	72
3	Keith	30	22	4	4	92	41	+51	70
4	Elgin City	30	21	1	8	71	39	+32	64
5	Fraserburgh	30	18	6	6	86	39	+47	60
6	Clachnacuddin	30	16	8	6	80	45	+35	56
7	Cove Rangers	30	16	5	9	88	48	+40	53
8	Forres Mechanics	30	11	6	13	60	60	0	39
9	Brora Rangers	30	11	5	14	61	63	−2	38
10	Deveronvale	30	11	4	15	57	72	−15	37
11	Rothes	30	8	5	17	46	64	−18	29
12	Buckie Thistle	30	8	4	18	36	60	−24	28
13	Lossiemouth	30	8	4	18	40	67	−27	28
14	Wick Academy	30	7	2	21	33	85	−52	23
15	Nairn County	30	3	2	25	32	114	−82	11
16	Fort William	30	1	1	28	24	127	−103	4

Source: Scottish Football Historical Archive - Highland League Final Tables
Rules for classification: 1) points; 2) goal difference; 3) number of goals scored.
(C) Champions
