= 2008–09 Highland Football League =

Scot-Ads Highland League
- Season: 2008–09
- Champions: Cove Rangers
- Goals: 790
- Average goals/game: 3.76
- Top goalscorer: 17 - Martin Johnston (Cove Rangers)
- Biggest home win: Deveronvale 10–0 Fort William
- Biggest away win: Fort William 0–8 Cove Rangers
- Highest scoring: Deveronvale 10–0 Fort William

The 2008–09 Highland Football League was won by Cove Rangers. Fort William finished bottom with the lowest points tally in the history of the league (1 point).

== Table ==
Pos	Team	Pld	W	D	L	GF	GA	GD	Pts
1	Cove Rangers (C)	28	22	4	2	96	26	+70	70
2	Deveronvale	28	18	7	3	78	31	+47	61
3	Inverurie Loco Works	28	18	3	7	72	33	+39	57
4	Keith	28	18	2	8	62	35	+27	56
5	Wick Academy	28	16	3	9	55	46	+9	51
6	Buckie Thistle	28	15	4	9	61	39	+22	49
7	Fraserburgh	28	13	8	7	62	47	+15	47
8	Huntly	28	14	4	10	51	40	+11	46
9	Forres Mechanics	28	12	7	9	64	42	+22	43
10	Nairn County	28	12	5	11	44	45	−1	41
11	Clachnacuddin	28	8	7	13	53	58	−5	31
12	Lossiemouth	28	7	4	17	31	55	−24	25
13	Rothes	28	2	4	22	24	80	−56	10
14	Brora Rangers	28	2	3	23	21	92	−71	9
15	Fort William	28	0	1	27	16	121	−105	1

Source: Highland Football League
Rules for classification: 1) points; 2) goal difference; 3) number of goals scored.
(C) Champions

== Results ==
Home \ Away	BRO	BUC	CLA	COV	DEV	FRR	FRT	FRA	HUN	LOC	KEIT	LOS	NAI	ROT	WIC
Brora Rangers		0–3	0–0	1–8	1–6	0–1	3–0	1–3	1–5	0–5	0–2	0–3	0–3	1–1	1–2
Buckie Thistle	4–0		2–3	0–2	1–1	0–3	7–1	3–0	2–4	0–3	0–3	4–0	3–0	1–0	6–2
Clachnacuddin	4–0	1–2		1–1	0–4	4–1	5–0	1–2	1–2	1–2	1–2	9–0	2–2	5–3	0–1
Cove Rangers	5–1	4–0	5–2		3–2	2–2	4–0	6–3	2–0	3–2	3–2	3–0	4–0	8–1	6–1
Deveronvale	5–0	0–2	2–2	1–1		1–0	10–0	4–3	3–0	3–2	2–4	1–0	4–1	4–2	2–0
Forres Mechanics	7–1	1–1	6–0	1–2	2–2		3–1	5–1	0–1	1–2	3–1	2–2	2–1	1–0	4–1
Fort William	0–4	0–5	1–2	0–8	1–6	0–5		0–5	2–4	1–3	0–5	1–3	0–5	1–2	1–1
Fraserburgh	4–0	1–3	1–1	2–1	1–1	3–3	6–0		1–1	1–1	2–0	3–2	3–2	5–1	4–2
Huntly	3–0	1–2	5–0	0–4	0–1	1–1	3–2	1–1		0–1	1–1	3–2	1–3	4–0	3–2
Inverurie Loco Works	5–1	1–1	2–1	2–0	1–1	4–1	7–1	3–1	0–1		2–4	2–0	1–2	5–2	1–3
Keith	3–1	2–1	5–0	0–1	1–3	2–1	6–1	2–0	1–2	2–1		3–0	2–2	2–1	1–3
Lossiemouth	3–0	0–2	0–3	0–3	0–1	2–2	4–1	1–1	1–0	0–2	1–2		1–1	1–0	1–2
Nairn County	1–0	0–0	4–1	0–4	2–2	3–1	2–0	0–2	0–2	1–4	2–1	1–0		2–0	1–2
Rothes	3–3	0–6	2–2	2–2	1–3	0–3	1–0	0–1	0–4	0–3	0–1	1–3	0–1		1–5
Wick Academy	2–1	4–0	1–1	0–1	0–3	3–2	2–0	2–2	2–0	1–2	1–2	2–1	3–0	3–0	

Source: Highland Football League
Legend: Blue = home team win; Yellow = draw; Red = away team win.
