= 2006–07 Highland Football League =

Scot-Ads Highland League
- Season: 2006–07
- Champions: Keith
- Goals: 756
- Average goals/game: 3.60
- Top goalscorer: 20 - Craig MacMillan (Cove Rangers)
- Biggest home win: Keith 9–1 Fort William
- Biggest away win: Brora Rangers 2–7 Huntly
- Highest scoring: Keith 9–1 Fort William

The 2006–07 Highland Football League was won by Keith. Fort William finished bottom.

== Table ==
Pos	Team	Pld	W	D	L	GF	GA	GD	Pts
1	Keith (C)	28	20	4	4	67	26	+41	64
2	Inverurie Loco Works	28	20	4	4	62	33	+29	64
3	Buckie Thistle	28	16	8	4	54	28	+26	56
4	Deveronvale	28	17	4	7	77	35	+42	55
5	Huntly	28	17	4	7	67	39	+28	55
6	Cove Rangers	28	13	6	9	52	36	+16	45
7	Nairn County	28	13	4	11	57	42	+15	43
8	Fraserburgh	28	11	8	9	48	42	+6	41
9	Clachnacuddin	28	9	6	13	43	42	+1	33
10	Rothes	28	10	2	16	42	57	−15	32
11	Wick Academy	28	10	2	16	44	61	−17	32
12	Forres Mechanics	28	7	7	14	54	60	−6	28
13	Brora Rangers	28	8	2	18	38	84	−46	26
14	Lossiemouth	28	3	5	20	25	64	−39	14
15	Fort William	28	3	0	25	26	107	−81	9

Source: Highland Football League
Rules for classification: 1) points; 2) goal difference; 3) number of goals scored.
(C) Champions

== Results ==
Home \ Away	BRO	BUC	CLA	COV	DEV	FRR	FRT	FRA	HUN	LOC	KEI	LOS	NAI	ROT	WIC
Brora Rangers		0–1	2–2	2–4	2–2	0–3	4–2	0–1	0–2	0–3	0–1	3–1	0–2	1–2	0–3
Buckie Thistle	3–0		3–1	1–2	0–0	3–0	4–0	3–0	1–1	2–0	1–1	3–1	3–0	2–1	4–0
Clachnacuddin	0–2	0–0		0–1	2–5	1–0	5–0	1–4	3–3	1–3	3–2	2–0	5–0	3–1	1–1
Cove Rangers	6–0	0–0	5–0		2–1	3–3	8–1	3–2	3–1	2–3	1–1	3–0	3–3	7–1	3–1
Deveronvale	3–1	1–1	3–0	0–0		3–1	11–0	4–1	1–1	4–1	2–2	4–0	4–0	4–1	5–1
Forres Mechanics	4–1	5–2	0–2	3–5	3–0		6–0	2–2	1–2	2–4	1–1	1–1	1–0	3–2	3–0
Fort William	1–4	1–2	0–5	2–7	1–7	0–7		0–2	0–8	0–13	0–6	1–2	1–3	4–2	1–4
Fraserburgh	5–0	3–0	2–1	2–4	2–2	3–1	8–0		2–4	4–0	3–0	2–1	2–2	4–3	2–0
Huntly	5–1	0–3	1–1	0–2	0–2	1–2	8–1	0–1		2–0	0–5	4–1	0–3	6–4	2–1
Inverurie Loco Works	4–1	2–0	3–1	3–3	3–2	3–0	3–0	4–0	1–4		0–0	3–0	2–0	1–1	0–1
Keith	7–1	2–1	2–0	1–0	1–3	2–2	6–0	2–1	3–0	2–2		4–1	5–2	6–0	5–0
Lossiemouth	1–0	0–3	1–1	0–1	2–3	0–5	4–0	1–1	0–1	2–1	0–3		0–2	0–2	0–0
Nairn County	4–3	0–1	1–1	1–2	0–4	2–0	4–0	0–1	1–1	2–1	1–4	2–2		1–0	2–1
Rothes	1–1	1–2	3–4	0–4	2–3	0–2	7–0	1–3	0–0	2–3	1–2	6–1	1–5		2–2
Wick Academy	1–1	2–5	2–3	1–1	3–2	3–6	8–0	3–2	1–3	2–1	1–4	5–0	1–0	1–2	

Source: Highland Football League
Legend: Blue = home team win; Yellow = draw; Red = away team win.
