= 2007–08 Highland Football League =

Scot-Ads Highland League
- Season: 2007–08
- Champions: Cove Rangers
- Goals: 821
- Average goals/game: 3.91
- Top goalscorer: 25 - Mark Chisholm (Deveronvale)
- Biggest home win: Deveronvale 11–0 Fort William
- Biggest away win: Fort William 0–13 Inverurie Loco Works
- Highest scoring: Fort William 0–13 Inverurie Loco Works

The 2007–08 Highland Football League was won by Cove Rangers while as Fort William finished bottom.

== Table ==
| Pos | Team | Pld | W | D | L | GF | GA | GD | Pts |
|---|---|---|---|---|---|---|---|---|---|
| 1 | Cove Rangers (C) | 28 | 19 | 7 | 2 | 85 | 33 | +52 | 64 |
| 2 | Keith | 28 | 18 | 7 | 3 | 80 | 27 | +53 | 61 |
| 3 | Deveronvale | 28 | 17 | 7 | 4 | 85 | 33 | +52 | 58 |
| 4 | Buckie Thistle | 28 | 17 | 6 | 5 | 54 | 24 | +30 | 57 |
| 5 | Fraserburgh | 28 | 16 | 3 | 9 | 65 | 43 | +22 | 51 |
| 6 | Inverurie Loco Works | 28 | 15 | 4 | 9 | 67 | 39 | +28 | 49 |
| 7 | Huntly | 28 | 13 | 6 | 9 | 60 | 44 | +16 | 45 |
| 8 | Forres Mechanics | 28 | 13 | 5 | 10 | 67 | 46 | +21 | 44 |
| 9 | Nairn County | 28 | 12 | 4 | 12 | 44 | 49 | −5 | 40 |
| 10 | Clachnacuddin | 28 | 10 | 7 | 11 | 49 | 50 | −1 | 37 |
| 11 | Wick Academy | 28 | 9 | 5 | 14 | 49 | 60 | −11 | 32 |
| 12 | Rothes | 28 | 5 | 4 | 19 | 49 | 75 | −26 | 19 |
| 13 | Lossiemouth | 28 | 4 | 5 | 19 | 22 | 66 | −44 | 17 |
| 14 | Brora Rangers | 28 | 4 | 4 | 20 | 29 | 74 | −45 | 16 |
| 15 | Fort William | 28 | 1 | 0 | 27 | 16 | 158 | −142 | 3 |

Source: Highland Football League
Rules for classification: 1) points; 2) goal difference; 3) number of goals scored.
(C) Champions

== Results ==
| Home \ Away | BRO | BUC | CLA | COV | DEV | FRR | FRT | FRA | HUN | LOC | KEI | LOS | NAI | ROT | WIC |
|---|---|---|---|---|---|---|---|---|---|---|---|---|---|---|---|
| Brora Rangers | | 0–1 | 2–2 | 2–4 | 2–2 | 0–3 | 4–2 | 0–1 | 0–2 | 0–3 | 0–1 | 3–1 | 0–2 | 1–2 | 0–3 |
| Buckie Thistle | 3–0 | | 3–1 | 1–2 | 0–0 | 3–0 | 4–0 | 3–0 | 1–1 | 2–0 | 1–1 | 3–1 | 3–0 | 2–1 | 4–0 |
| Clachnacuddin | 0–2 | 0–0 | | 0–1 | 2–5 | 1–0 | 5–0 | 1–4 | 3–3 | 1–3 | 3–2 | 2–0 | 5–0 | 3–1 | 1–1 |
| Cove Rangers | 6–0 | 0–0 | 5–0 | | 2–1 | 3–3 | 8–1 | 3–2 | 3–1 | 3–3 | 1–1 | 3–0 | 3–3 | 7–1 | 3–1 |
| Deveronvale | 3–1 | 1–1 | 3–0 | 0–0 | | 3–1 | 11–0 | 4–1 | 1–1 | 4–1 | 2–2 | 4–0 | 4–0 | 4–1 | 5–1 |
| Forres Mechanics | 4–1 | 5–2 | 0–2 | 3–5 | 3–0 | | 6–0 | 2–2 | 1–2 | 2–4 | 1–1 | 1–1 | 1–0 | 3–2 | 3–0 |
| Fort William | 1–4 | 1–2 | 0–5 | 2–7 | 1–7 | 0–7 | | 0–2 | 0–8 | 0–13 | 0–6 | 1–2 | 1–3 | 4–2 | 1–4 |
| Fraserburgh | 5–0 | 3–0 | 2–1 | 2–4 | 2–2 | 3–1 | 8–0 | | 2–4 | 4–0 | 3–0 | 2–1 | 2–3 | 4–3 | 2–0 |
| Huntly | 5–1 | 0–3 | 1–1 | 0–2 | 0–2 | 1–2 | 8–1 | 0–1 | | 2–0 | 0–5 | 4–1 | 0–3 | 6–4 | 2–1 |
| Inverurie Loco Works | 4–0 | 2–0 | 3–1 | 3–3 | 3–2 | 3–0 | 3–0 | 4–0 | 1–4 | | 0–0 | 3–0 | 2–0 | 1–1 | 0–1 |
| Keith | 7–1 | 2–1 | 2–0 | 1–0 | 1–3 | 0–5 | 6–0 | 2–1 | 3–0 | 2–2 | | 4–1 | 5–2 | 6–0 | 5–0 |
| Lossiemouth | 1–0 | 0–3 | 1–1 | 0–1 | 2–3 | 0–5 | 4–0 | 1–1 | 0–1 | 2–1 | 0–3 | | 0–2 | 0–2 | 0–0 |
| Nairn County | 4–3 | 0–1 | 1–1 | 1–2 | 0–4 | 2–0 | 4–0 | 0–1 | 1–1 | 2–1 | 1–4 | 2–2 | | 1–0 | 2–1 |
| Rothes | 1–1 | 1–2 | 3–4 | 0–4 | 2–3 | 0–2 | 7–0 | 1–3 | 0–0 | 2–3 | 1–2 | 6–1 | 1–5 | | 2–2 |
| Wick Academy | 1–1 | 2–5 | 2–3 | 1–1 | 3–2 | 3–6 | 8–0 | 3–2 | 1–3 | 2–1 | 1–4 | 5–0 | 1–0 | 1–2 | |

Source: Highland Football League
Legend: Blue = home team win; Yellow = draw; Red = away team win.
