= Elgin Caledonian F.C. =

Former association football club in Moray, Scotland

Elgin Caledonian
- Full name: Elgin Caledonian Football Club
- Nickname(s): The Caley, The Boys in Blue
- Founded: 1892
- Dissolved: 1926
- Ground: Public Park
Home colours

Elgin Caledonian Football Club was a Scottish football team from Elgin, Moray.

== History ==
The club was formed in 1892 as a "Junior" outfit.

The "Caley" was a highly successful Junior club in Elgin & District. It won the Elginshire Junior F.A. Cup for its first three seasons of competition. The first in May 1895, when Elgin Wednesday were beaten 3–1 at the Public Park, then again in March 1896, when Elgin Academy were defeated 7–4 at Milnfield Park. The hat-trick was completed in March 1897, when they beat Nairn Thistle 2–1 at Milnfield Park. After a few lean seasons the club returned to complete a double in the 1899–1900 term, when it beat Nairn Thistle 5–3 to win the now named Elginshire Matthew F.A. Cup, then won the Nicholson Cup (run on a League basis) for the first time.

In August 1900, the club applied to take part in the Highland Football League, on the basis that it was now the leading club in Elgin, as Elgin City was "reported to be defunct"; the Highland League committee unanimously voted to accept the application, the league secretary immediately wiring the City secretary that City was not permitted to take part. However, City was quickly "re-organised", and Caley's move was a disaster, as it finished bottom of the league with seven defeats in seven games.

The club stepped back to recover and re-appeared in junior football in 1902. It was a founder member of the Elginshire Junior League in early 1906. By the start of the second season (1906–07) it became known as the Morayshire Junior league. The "Caley" took the title in May 1907 after beating Elgin Thistle in a play-off (replay). It also took the title in 1907–08 season, being unbeaten in their 12 games, with 11 wins and a draw, and also won the Matthew Cup defeating Nairn Thistle in a replayed final in March 1908.

Eleven of its players joined the Armed Forces at the outset of the First World War, more than had joined from Elgin City, and the last reference to the club is playing in the Morayshire Junior League in 1925–26.

A club of the same name was founded in 2010, to play in the Forres and Nairn Welfare League.

== Colours ==
The club wore blue jerseys and white shorts.

== Ground ==
Caley played most of its home matches at the Public Park (now known as Borough Briggs and the current home of Elgin City). Some of its big matches, including most cup ties (which required a private ground), were played at Association Park and then Milnfield Park, at the time Elgin City's home ground.
