= 2nd Highland Light Infantry F.C. =

Former association football club

2nd Highland Light Infantry
- Full name: 2nd Highland Light Infantry F.C.
- Nickname: the H.L.I.
- Founded: 1886?
- Dissolved: 1939?
- Ground: Fort George
Home colours

The 2nd Highland Light Infantry F.C. was an association football club active up until the Second World War.

== History ==
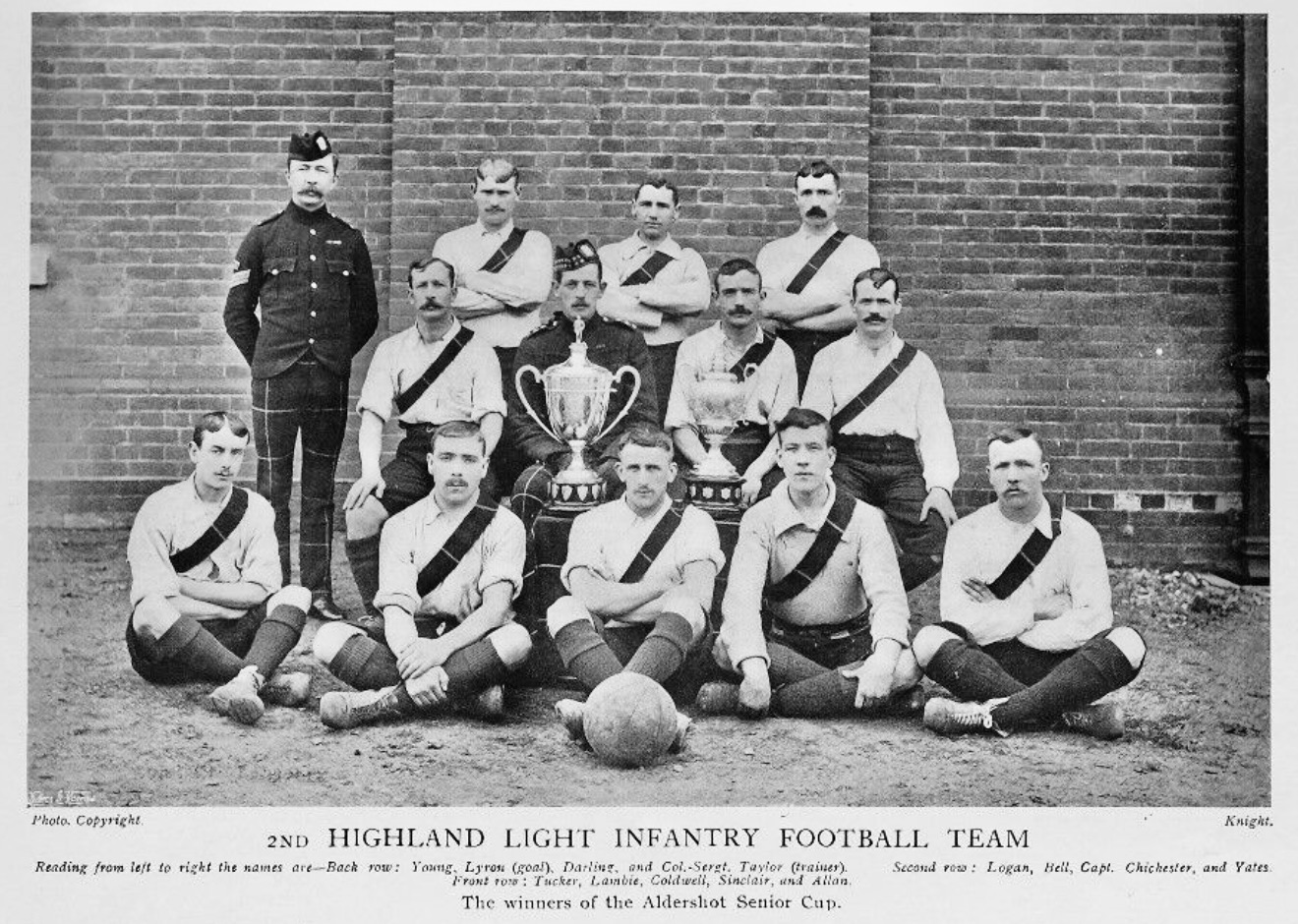
2nd Highland Light Infantry F.C., Navy & Army Illustrated, 26 April 1902, p. 129

The club was an army side, taken from the Highland Light Infantry (originally the 74th (Highland) Regiment of Foot). The earliest records for the military side are from 1886, when the battalion was stationed in India.

The side had some success at army level, winning the Durand Cup in India in 1889, 1890, 1893, 1894, and 1895 - the third consecutive win entitling the regiment to possession of the trophy outright. On the battalion's return to the United Kingdom in 1900, it entered - and won - the Army Challenge Cup and Military League. It won the Aldershot Cup in 1901–02, having been finalists the previous season.

It became a senior outfit in 1907–08 when stationed at Fort George, joining the Scottish Football Association. It entered the Highland League and Scottish Qualifying Cup for the first time that season. It lost 2–1 to Inverness Thistle in the first round of the Qualifying Cup, but had a good debut League season, finishing 2nd of the seven clubs, albeit 6 points behind champions Clachnacuddin.

Its second and last season as a senior club however was less successful, as the battalion was re-deployed to Cork in January 1909, replaced at Fort George by the Seaforth Highlanders. The club therefore finished the Highland League at the bottom, albeit the club did earn a surprise 3–0 win at Inverness Caledonian in the Qualifying Cup, losing to Clachnacuddin in the second round. It was duly struck from the Scottish FA roll at the start of the 1909–10 season and never re-joined the association. On a return to the area, the H.L.I. won the North Caledonian League (playing mostly against Highland League reserve sides) in 1937–38 and 1938–39.

== Colours ==
The club wore white jerseys with a tartan sash, and dark shorts and stockings; the regiment used the Mackenzie tartan.

== Ground ==
The club's ground during its run as a senior club in Scotland was at its Fort George barracks near Inverness. One issue was the club could not use the ground for Cup ties and had to play them all away from home, regardless of draw.
