= Highland Football League =

Association football league in Scotland

- Founded: 1893
- Country: Scotland
- Number of clubs: 18
- Level on pyramid: 5
- Promotion to: Scottish League Two
- Relegation to: North Caledonian Football League; North of Scotland Football League
- Domestic cup(s): Scottish Cup; Scottish League Cup (champions); Scottish Challenge Cup (top 4)
- League cup: Highland League Cup
- Current champions: Brora Rangers (6th title) (2025–26)
- Most championships: Clachnacuddin; Caledonian (18 titles each)
- Website: highlandfootballleague.com
- Current: 2026–27 Highland Football League

The Scottish Highland Football League (SHFL, commonly known as the Highland League) is a senior football league based in the north of Scotland. The league sits at level 5 on the Scottish football league system, acting as a feeder to the Scottish Professional Football League.

Founded in 1893, it is currently composed of 18 member clubs in a single division. Historically, until the reformation of the Lowland League, the league covered Scotland north of the Tay, including the Highland council region as well as Moray, Aberdeenshire, the cities of Aberdeen and Dundee, Angus and parts of northern Perthshire. From the 2026–27 season onwards, the league only covered the Highlands, Moray and Aberdeenshire.

Since 2014–15, it has featured in the senior pyramid system. The winners take part in an end-of-season promotion play-off with the Lowland Football League champions, with the winners then competing against the bottom club in Scottish League Two for a place in the SPFL. Promotion and relegation also exists between the two Highlands-based regional leagues at level 6 (The North Caledonian League, and the North of Scotland Football League). Prior to the 2025–26 season, the Tayside-based Midlands Football League was also a feeder to the Highland League, before moving to become a feeder league to the Lowland League East, when the Lowland League restructured into East and West.

The league's current sponsorship deal is with the Breedon Group.

== Format ==
Each team in the league plays each other twice during a season – once at home, once away, for a total of 34 matches. The standard league scoring system of 3 points for a win and 1 for a draw is applied, with ties in the league table broken by goal difference. The champions are presented with the League trophy and a flag, either immediately after the match which secures the victory, or at the next match at which it is practical to do so.

With the introduction of the new pyramid structure in Scottish football, a new schedule was introduced in the 2014–15 season, in order to ensure that all matches affecting the title are completed in time for the promotion playoffs beginning in April. As the region is prone to severe weather in winter, postponements have sometimes caused the conclusion of the season to be delayed (e.g. in 2013, a prolonged spell of bad weather meant the final matches were not played until 25 May). Various proposals which would have reduced the number of matches a team would play (either by instituting a two-phase season like that used in the Scottish Premiership, or by dividing the League into two smaller divisions), were considered but did not find favour with League members. Instead, clubs now play both a Saturday and a Wednesday fixture most weeks from August through October, taking advantage of milder weather at the start of the season. The new schedule builds in a four-week buffer near the end of the season during which no matches are initially scheduled, allowing any backlog of postponed matches to be cleared before the final fixtures.

=== Scottish Cup ===
All clubs are full members of the Scottish Football Association, so qualify automatically for the following season's first round of the Scottish Cup. The league champions and the runner-up team receive a bye into the cup's second round. Since 2014 the champions have taken part in the Scottish Challenge Cup; this was extended to the top four clubs from 2016. In 2016 the champions also gained a place in the Scottish League Cup.

== History ==
=== Formation ===
The Highland Football League was formed on 4 August 1893, at the Inverness Workman's Club by employees of the Highland Railway Company who had their Company Headquarters, Locomotive and Carriage & Wagon Workshops (Loch Gorm Works), based in the Highland capital and where they employed circa 700 staff. The original league consisted of seven teams: Inverness Thistle, Caledonian, Clachnacuddin, Forres Mechanics, Inverness Union, Inverness Citadel and Cameron Highlanders. Dingwall Victoria United (later renamed Ross County) were an eighth original member, but resigned membership in November 1893. The inaugural champions were Inverness Thistle. Of the original teams, two are still playing in the league today (Clachnacuddin and Forres Mechanics) while Caledonian and Thistle merged to become current Scottish League club Inverness Caledonian Thistle.

=== Departures and expansions ===
The league has been somewhat weakened by the departure of many former members who have subsequently joined the SFL. In 1994, Caledonian, Inverness Thistle and Ross County left. Until then the HFL had operated with 18 clubs; this was reduced by the departure of the three mentioned clubs, but Wick Academy from the North Caledonian Football League were elected, to create a league of 16 clubs. This was the state of affairs till 2000 when Elgin City and Peterhead were elected into the SFL. In 2002 Inverurie Loco Works were elected into the HFL to give it a membership of 15 clubs. Inverurie Locos are another Highland League football club with its origins in the Scottish railways, having been formed by employees of the Great North of Scotland Railway who had their Locomotive and Carriage and Wagon Workshops in Inverurie, hence the football club's name.

In 2008, North Region Junior League sides Formartine United and Turriff United both submitted bids to join the Highland League, following in the footsteps of past Junior League side Inverurie Locos. Banks O' Dee and Strathspey Thistle also applied. On 25 February 2009, Formartine United, Strathspey Thistle and Turriff United were accepted into the league for the following season, with Banks O' Dee being the unsuccessful club.

=== Pyramid ===
Until the reorganisation of Scottish football during the 2012–13 season, the league was historically one of the senior leagues in Scottish football, along with the Scottish Premier League and Scottish Football League, as well as the East of Scotland and South of Scotland Leagues.

Since the 2014–15 season, the league champions have had the chance to qualify for promotion to the Scottish League Two via a play-off with the winners of the Lowland Football League, the winners then playing off against the bottom team in League Two. Although the introduction of a route into the Scottish Professional Football League was broadly welcomed, it also provoked some concern about the potential financial burden on smaller clubs who may need to significantly upgrade their grounds to meet the required standards. The logistics of travel to away games in a league dominated by central belt teams is also a concern, particularly for geographically remote clubs such as Wick Academy and Brora Rangers.

At the end of the 2018–19 season, Cove Rangers became the first Highland League club to gain promotion to the SPFL via the pyramid play-off, after beating Berwick Rangers 7–0 on aggregate in the League Two play-off final. Two years later, Brechin City became the first SPFL club to be relegated into the Highland League after losing 3–1 on aggregate to Kelty Hearts in the League Two play-off final.

At the end of the 2020–21 season the threat of relegation was introduced to the league, as the North Caledonian League, a newly formed Midlands League, and North Superleague were all brought into the pyramid as feeder leagues. At the end of the following season, Fort William became the first victim of the drop as they failed to play their games against North Superleague side Banks O' Dee in the playoff final, giving the Aberdeen side a bye into the Highland League as Fort William fell into the North Caledonian League. With the departure of Brechin City to the Lowland League East following the conclusion of the 2025–26 season, regardless of final positioning, North Caledonian League champions, Invergordon, were invited to join the league for the first time ahead of the 2026–27 season.

== Member clubs ==
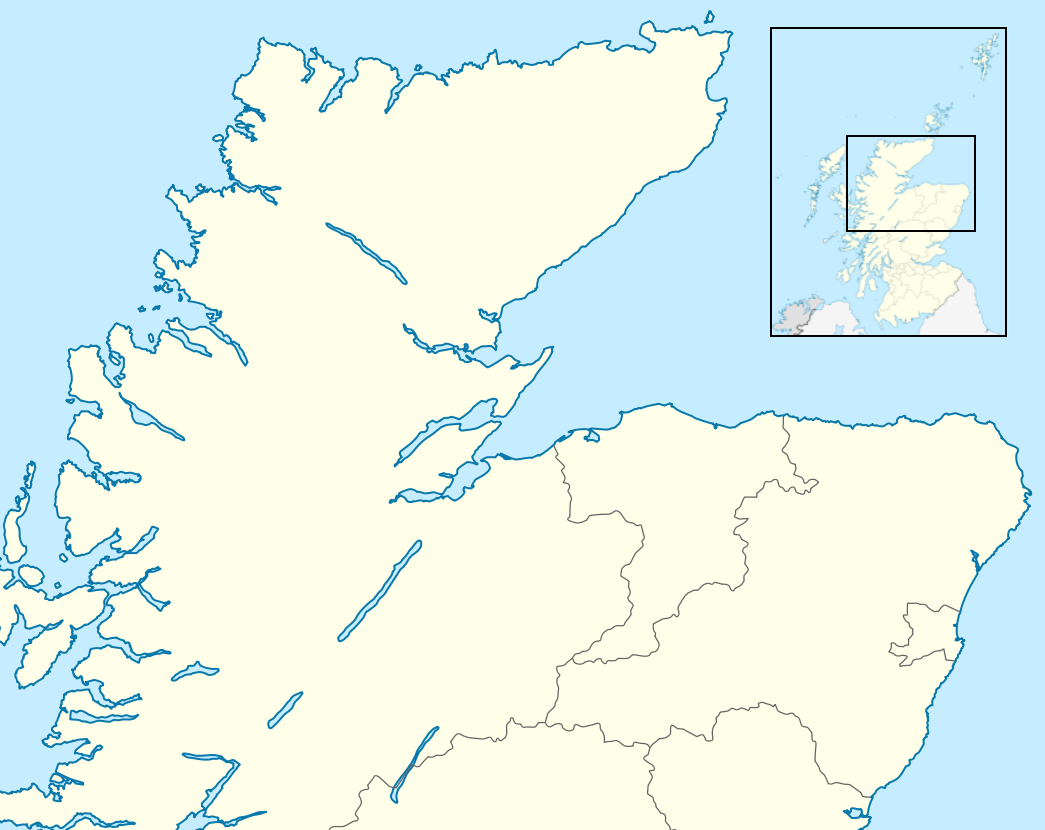
Location of teams in 2026–27 Highland Football League

Team	Location	Stadium	Capacity	Seats	Joined	Titles
Banks O' Dee	Aberdeen	Spain Park	876	100	2022	
Brora Rangers	Brora	Dudgeon Park	4,000	200	1962	3
Buckie Thistle	Buckie	Victoria Park	3,000	400	1909	12
Clachnacuddin	Inverness	Grant Street Park	2,074	154	1893	18
Deveronvale	Banff	Princess Royal Park	2,600	360	1938	2
Formartine United	Pitmedden	North Lodge Park	2,500	300	2009	
Forres Mechanics	Forres	Mosset Park	2,700	502	1893 (Note: Forres Mechanics did not compete 1895–1896, 1901–1902, and 2020–21.)	2
Fraserburgh	Fraserburgh	Bellslea Park	3,000	480	1922 (Note: Fraserburgh did not compete 1926–1928.)	4
Huntly	Huntly	Christie Park	3,500	270	1928	7
Invergordon	Invergordon	Recreation Park	TBC	TBC	2026	
Inverurie Loco Works	Inverurie	Harlaw Park	1,400	250	2001	
Keith	Keith	Kynoch Park	2,362	370	1924	7
Lossiemouth	Lossiemouth	Grant Park	2,050	250	1946	
Nairn County	Nairn	Station Park	2,250	250	1914	1
Rothes	Rothes	Mackessack Park	2,700	184	1938	1
Strathspey Thistle	Grantown-on-Spey	Seafield Park	1,600	150	2009	
Turriff United	Turriff	The Haughs	2,135	135	2009	
Wick Academy	Wick	Harmsworth Park	2,412	102	1994	

=== Former members ===
Elected to the Scottish Football League

- Elgin City, 2000; (Scottish League Two)
- Caledonian*, 1994;
- Inverness Thistle*, 1994;
- Peterhead, 2000; (Scottish League One)
- Ross County, 1994; (Scottish League One)

*Caledonian and Inverness Thistle combined to form Inverness Caledonian Thistle upon joining the Scottish Football League in 1994. ICT now play in the Scottish Championship.

Promoted to the Scottish Professional Football League

- Cove Rangers, 2019; (Scottish League One)

Relegated to the North Caledonian League/Midlands League/North Region League/North of Scotland League

- Fort William, 2022; (North Caledonian League)

Transferred to alternative league

- Brechin City, 2026 (Lowland League East)

Defunct/merged

- Elgin Caledonian, left; joined Morayshire Junior League in 1902, folded 1926
- Inverness Celtic, folded; 1898
- Inverness Citadel, folded; 1937
- Inverness Union, merged with Inverness Thistle; either 1895 or 1899

Military sides (generally temporarily based in the area)

- 1st Highland Light Infantry
- 2nd Highland Light Infantry
- 93rd Highlanders
- Black Watch
- Cameron Highlanders
- Highland Garrison Training Battalion
- K.O.S.B.
- RAF Kinloss
- Seaforth Highlanders

== Other competitions ==
The main competitions are:

- Highland League Cup
- SHFL U18 League
- SHFL U16 League

The North of Scotland FA Clubs compete in the:

- North of Scotland Cup
- North of Scotland FA U20 League

The Aberdeenshire FA clubs compete in the:

- Aberdeenshire Cup
- Aberdeenshire Shield
- Aberdeenshire & District League

== List of HFL championship winners ==
Season	Winner	Runner-up
1893–94	Inverness Thistle	Caledonian
1894–95	Clachnacuddin	Inverness Thistle
1895–96	Caledonian (Note: won after a play-off)	Inverness Thistle
1896–97	Clachnacuddin	Caledonian
1897–98	Clachnacuddin	Caledonian
1898–99	Caledonian	Clachnacuddin
1899–1900	Caledonian	Clachnacuddin
1900–01	Clachnacuddin	Caledonian
1901–02	Caledonian	Inverness Thistle
1902–03	Clachnacuddin	Inverness Thistle
1903–04	Clachnacuddin	Inverness Citadel
1904–05	Clachnacuddin (Note: Clachnacuddin were awarded the Championship after Black Watch refused to play-off due to the referee that the League appointed)	Black Watch
1905–06	Clachnacuddin	Caledonian
1906–07	Inverness Thistle	Caledonian
1907–08	Clachnacuddin	Highland Light Infantry
1908–09	Inverness Citadel	Clachnacuddin
1909–10	Inverness Thistle	Elgin City
1910–11	Caledonian	Buckie Thistle
1911–12	Clachnacuddin	Caledonian
1912–13	Aberdeen 'A'	Buckie Thistle
1913–14	Caledonian	Aberdeen 'A'
1914–15	unfinished (Note: Clachnacuddin had most points)	
1919–20	Buckie Thistle	Clachnacuddin
1920–21	Clachnacuddin	Inverness Thistle
1921–22	Clachnacuddin	Buckie Thistle
1922–23	Clachnacuddin	Elgin City
1923–24	Clachnacuddin	Buckie Thistle
1924–25	Aberdeen 'A'	Caledonian
1925–26	Caledonian	Inverness Thistle
1926–27	Buckie Thistle	Clachnacuddin
1927–28	Buckie Thistle	Clachnacuddin
1928–29	Inverness Thistle	Elgin City
1929–30	Huntly	Elgin City
1930–31	Caledonian	Buckie Thistle
1931–32	Elgin City	Keith
1932–33	Fraserburgh	Elgin City
1933–34	Buckie Thistle	Forres Mechanics
1934–35	Elgin City	Huntly
1935–36	Inverness Thistle	Peterhead
1936–37	Buckie Thistle	Peterhead
1937–38	Fraserburgh	Clachnacuddin
1938–39	Clachnacuddin	Buckie Thistle
1939–40	unfinished (Note: Keith had most points)	
1946–47	Peterhead	Huntly
1947–48	Clachnacuddin	Peterhead
1948–49	Peterhead	Clachnacuddin
1949–50	Peterhead	Caledonian
1950–51	Caledonian	Buckie Thistle
1951–52	Caledonian	Huntly
1952–53	Elgin City	Buckie Thistle
1953–54	Buckie Thistle	Elgin City
1954–55	unfinished (Note: Fraserburgh and Clachnacuddin were equal on points)	
1955–56	Elgin City	Buckie Thistle
1956–57	Buckie Thistle	Caledonian
1957–58	Buckie Thistle	Elgin City
1958–59	Rothes	Fraserburgh
1959–60	Elgin City	Caledonian
1960–61	Elgin City	Keith
1961–62	Keith	Elgin City
1962–63	Elgin City	Caledonian
1963–64	Caledonian	Nairn County
1964–65	Elgin City	Nairn County
1965–66	Elgin City	Caledonian
1966–67	Ross County	Elgin City
1967–68	Elgin City	Ross County
1968–69	Elgin City	Inverness Thistle
1969–70	Elgin City	Caledonian
1970–71	Caledonian	Inverness Thistle
1971–72	Inverness Thistle	Elgin City
1972–73	Inverness Thistle	Ross County
1973–74	Elgin City	Inverness Thistle
1974–75	Clachnacuddin	Keith
1975–76	Nairn County	Fraserburgh
1976–77	Caledonian	Peterhead
1977–78	Caledonian	Peterhead
1978–79	Keith	Caledonian
1979–80	Keith	Brora Rangers
1980–81	Keith	Fraserburgh
1981–82	Caledonian	Peterhead
1982–83	Caledonian	Elgin City
1983–84	Caledonian	Keith
1984–85	Keith	Caledonian
1985–86	Forres Mechanics	Elgin City
1986–87	Inverness Thistle	Caledonian
1987–88	Caledonian	Buckie Thistle
1988–89	Peterhead	Cove Rangers
1989–90	Elgin City	Caledonian
1990–91	Ross County	Caledonian
1991–92	Ross County	Caledonian
1992–93	withheld (Note: Elgin City won the league, but were found to have dishonestly requested the bringing forward of their final match in order to avoid two players being unavailable through suspension)	
1993–94	Huntly	Caledonian
1994–95	Huntly	Cove Rangers
1995–96	Huntly	Cove Rangers
1996–97	Huntly	Keith
1997–98	Huntly	Fraserburgh
1998–99	Peterhead	Huntly
1999–2000	Keith	Fraserburgh
2000–01	Cove Rangers	Huntly
2001–02	Fraserburgh	Deveronvale
2002–03	Deveronvale	Keith
2003–04	Clachnacuddin	Buckie Thistle
2004–05	Huntly	Inverurie Loco Works
2005–06	Deveronvale	Inverurie Loco Works
2006–07	Keith	Inverurie Loco Works
2007–08	Cove Rangers	Keith
2008–09	Cove Rangers	Deveronvale
2009–10	Buckie Thistle	Cove Rangers
2010–11	Buckie Thistle	Deveronvale
2011–12	Forres Mechanics	Cove Rangers
2012–13	Cove Rangers	Formartine United
2013–14	Brora Rangers	Inverurie Loco Works
2014–15	Brora Rangers	Turriff United
2015–16	Cove Rangers	Formartine United
2016–17	Buckie Thistle	Cove Rangers
2017–18	Cove Rangers	Formartine United
2018–19	**Cove Rangers***	Brora Rangers
2019–20	Brora Rangers	Fraserburgh
2020–21	Brora Rangers	Fraserburgh
2021–22	Fraserburgh	Buckie Thistle
2022–23	Brechin City	Buckie Thistle
2023–24	Buckie Thistle	Brechin City
2024–25	Brora Rangers	Brechin City
2025–26	Brora Rangers	Brechin City

* Team promoted to Scottish League Two

Source:Scottish Football Historical Archive – Highland League Final Tables

=== Performance by club ===
As of after 2025–26

Clubs currently playing in the league are shown in bold. Clubs no longer active are shown in italics.

Club	Winners	Runners-up	Winning years
Caledonian	18	21	1895–96, 1898–99, 1899–1900, 1901–02, 1910–11, 1913–14, 1925–26, 1930–31, 1950–51, 1951–52, 1963–64, 1970–71, 1976–77, 1977–78, 1981–82, 1982–83, 1983–84, 1987–88
**Clachnacuddin**	18	8	1894–95, 1896–97, 1897–98, 1900–01, 1902–03, 1903–04, 1904–05, 1905–06, 1907–08, 1911–12, 1920–21, 1921–22, 1922–23, 1923–24, 1938–39, 1947–48, 1974–75, 2003–04
Elgin City	14	12	1931–32, 1934–35, 1952–53, 1955–56, 1959–60, 1960–61, 1962–63, 1964–65, 1965–66, 1967–68, 1968–69, 1969–70, 1973–74, 1989–90
**Buckie Thistle**	12	13	1919–20, 1926–27, 1927–28, 1933–34, 1936–37, 1953–54, 1956–57, 1957–58, 2009–10, 2010–11, 2016–17, 2023–24
Inverness Thistle	8	9	1893–94, 1906–07, 1909–10, 1928–29, 1935–36, 1971–72, 1972–73, 1986–87
**Keith**	7	7	1961–62, 1978–79, 1979–80, 1980–81, 1984–85, 1999–2000, 2006–07
Cove Rangers	7	6	2000–01, 2007–08, 2008–09, 2012–13, 2015–16, 2017–18, 2018–19
**Huntly**	7	5	1929–30, 1993–94, 1994–95, 1995–96, 1996–97, 1997–98, 2004–05
**Brora Rangers**	6	2	2013–14, 2014–15, 2019–20, 2020–21, 2024–25, 2025–26
Peterhead	5	6	1946–47, 1948–49, 1949–50, 1988–89, 1998–99
**Fraserburgh**	4	7	1932–33, 1937–38, 2001–02, 2021–22
Ross County	3	2	1966–67, 1990–91, 1991–92
**Deveronvale**	2	3	2002–03, 2005–06
Aberdeen 'A'	2	1	1912–13, 1924–25
**Forres Mechanics**	2	1	1985–86, 2011–12
Brechin City	1	3	2022–23
**Nairn County**	1	2	1975–76
Inverness Citadel	1	1	1908–09
**Rothes**	1	0	1958–59
**Inverurie Loco Works**	0	4	
**Formartine United**	0	3	
Black Watch	0	1	
Highland Light Infantry	0	1	
**Turriff United**	0	1	

== Playoff performances ==
Following being officially incorporated into the Scottish Football Pyramid, from the 2014–15 season, the champions of the Highland and Lowland leagues would enter into a playoff, with the winner progressing to the final to play the 10th place team in SPFL League Two.

Promotion playoffs (Highland League score listed first)
Season	Highland League Club	Aggregate Score	Opponent
2014–15	Brora Rangers	2–2 (4–3p)	Edinburgh City
2014–15	Brora Rangers	2–3	Montrose
2015–16	Cove Rangers	1–4	Edinburgh City
2016–17	Buckie Thistle	3–4	East Kilbride
2017–18	Cove Rangers	5–2	The Spartans
2017–18	Cove Rangers	2–3	Cowdenbeath
2018–19	Cove Rangers	5–1	East Kilbride
2018–19	Cove Rangers	7–0	Berwick Rangers
2019–20	Cancelled due to Coronavirus Pandemic		
2020–21	Brora Rangers	1–6	Kelty Hearts
2021–22	Fraserburgh	2–3	Bonnyrigg Rose Athletic
2022–23	Brechin City	3–4	The Spartans
2023–24	Buckie Thistle	w/o (Note: East Kilbride given bye to the final due to Buckie Thistle not meeting required licence criteria)	East Kilbride
2024–25	Brora Rangers	4–7	East Kilbride
2025–26	Brora Rangers	1–3 (Note: Brora Rangers given bye to the final due to Linlithgow Rose not meeting required licence criteria)	Edinburgh City

Following the end of the 2020–21 season, the North Caledonian, Midlands, and North Junior Superleague, were admitted into the Scottish Pyramid, forming a 6th tier below the Highland League. Ahead of the 2026–27 season, the Midlands League transferred to become a feeder to the Lowland League. As of the 2025–26 season, no relegation playoff games have ever been played, largely due to the lack of SFA Licensed teams in any of the feeder leagues winning the title.

Relegation Play-off
Season	Highland League Club	Aggregate Score	Opponent
2021–22	Fort William	w/o (Note: Fort William withdrew after failing to raise a team)	Banks o' Dee (NSL); Carnoustie Panmure (MFL), Invergordon (NCFA) ineligible
2022–23	Strathspey Thistle	N/A	Carnoustie Panmure (MFL), Culter (SJFA), Loch Ness (NCFA) ineligible
2023–24	Strathspey Thistle	N/A	Culter (SJFA), Dundee North End (MFL), Invergordon (NCFA) ineligible
2024–25	Rothes	N/A	Culter (SJFA), Dundee North End (MFL), Invergordon (NCFA) ineligible
2025–26	Rothes	N/A (Note: Invergordon automatically promoted due to transfer of Brechin City to Lowland League East)	Invergordon (NCFA); Stonehaven (NoSFL) ineligible
