= Kynoch Park =

Stadium in Keith, Scotland

Coordinates: 57°32′27″N 2°56′41″W

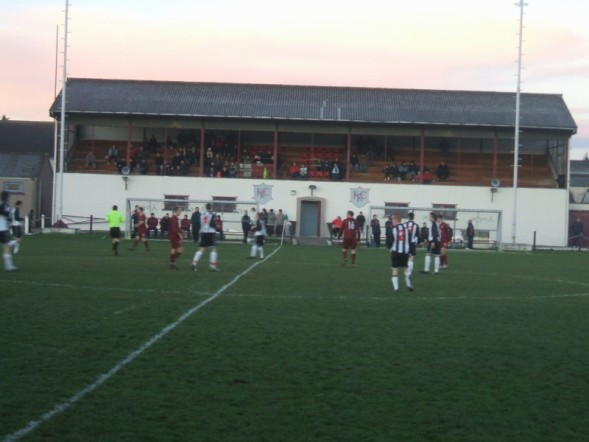
- Keith take on Fraserburgh at Kynoch Park in the club's Highland League winning season of 2006–07

- Location within Moray
- Location: Balloch Road, Keith, Moray, Scotland
- Owner: Keith F.C.
- Capacity: 2,362 (370 seated)
- Record attendance: 5,820 v Celtic; 4 February 1928
- Field size: 110 x 70 yards

Construction
- Built: 1922

Tenant
- Keith F.C. (1924–present)

Kynoch Park is a football ground in Keith in north-east Scotland, which is the home ground of Highland Football League side Keith F.C. It is located on Balloch Road in the east of the town and has a capacity of 2,362 with 370 seated.

== History ==
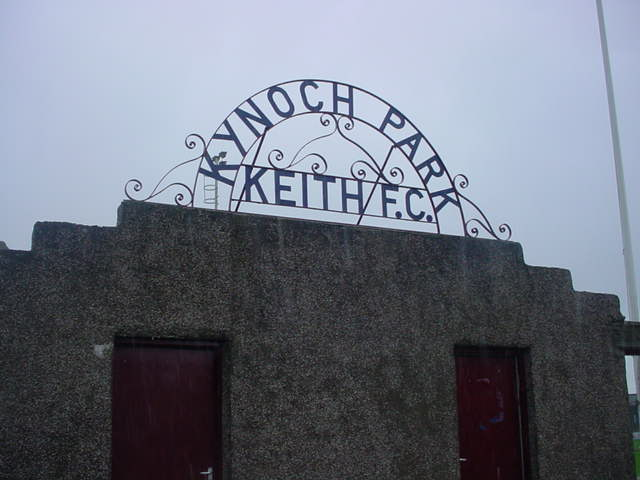
Outside Kynoch Park, Keith (2006)

Keith F.C. was founded in 1910 and then reformed on 26 January 1919. The club played their game homes games at Seafield Park whilst competing in the Huntly and District League until 1922, when Sir John Kynoch donated Kynoch Park. Keith were admitted to the Highland Football League two years later in 1924 and have played their home games at Kynoch Park in the league ever since.

The club's first Scottish Cup tie at Kynoch Park came in 1928 against opponents Dalbeattie Star with Keith winning 5–2 to progress to the next round. The club was then drawn against Scottish giants Celtic in the second round, also at home. This game resulted in the highest attendance recorded at Kynoch Park when 5,820 spectators watched the club take on Celtic in the 6–1 defeat of the home side in February 1928. The club has also been drawn against Rangers at home in the Scottish Cup in 1995–96 but chose to move the venue to Pittodrie Stadium in Aberdeen. 15,000 spectators watched Keith lose 10–1 in the third round match. Rangers went on to win the tournament that season.

== Transport ==
The nearest railway station is Keith railway station which is around a 20-minute walk from the ground. The station lies on the main Aberdeen to Inverness Line.

Stagecoach Bluebird provides an hourly bus service connecting Keith to Inverness and Aberdeen as well as local towns along the A96 road.
