= Strathspey Thistle F.C. =

Association football club in Scotland

Strathspey Thistle
- Full name: Strathspey Thistle Football Club
- Nickname: The Strathy Jags
- Founded: 1993
- Ground: Seafield Park, Grantown-on-Spey
- Capacity: 1,600 (150 seated)
- Coordinates: 57.3329°N 3.6005°W
- Chairman: Donly McLeod
- Manager: Aaron Doran
- League: Highland League
- 2025–26: Highland League, 13th of 18
Home colours	Away colours

Strathspey Thistle Football Club are a senior football club from Grantown-on-Spey in the Highlands of Scotland. They currently play in the Highland League, but formerly played in Junior football from 1993.

== Club History ==
Strathspey Thistle was formed in 1993.

Strathspey Thistle's first ever game was a home friendly against the then Highland League side Inverness Thistle, on 19 July 1993. The game ended up with Inverness Thistle winning 4–3.

In 1995 Highland Council agreed that the club could use its current ground, Seafield Park all season one of the reasons being local welfare side Grantown FC, had folded and had given the use of the changing rooms over to Strathspey Thistle's care for the sum of £1.00

A major landmark in the clubs' history happened on the afternoon of 7 June 1998 at Seafield Park, they won The Clive Williamson Trophy beating Nairn St. Ninian 2–1 after extra time. Robbie MacDougall scored both goals.

In 2000, the club lost two cup finals, losing 4–0 against Forres Thistle in the Stewart Cup Final. In the Robbie Nicol Trophy in Elgin, the club were leading Deveronside 1–0 before conceding a goal in the ninety-sixth minute, after scoring again in extra time they conceded two more goals in the last few minutes to lose 2–3.

In 2009, Strathspey Thistle were accepted into senior football in the Highland League on 25 February 2009 and entered the league for the start of the 2009–10 season. Their first match was an 8–1 defeat against Wick Academy.

In 2020–21 season, the team only managed to play a single cup tie the whole season due to the Covid Pandemic. They ended the season 11th place out of 16 teams, achieving their highest Highland League finish.

== Stadium ==
Strathspey Thistle's home ground is Seafield Park in Grantown-on-Spey. The stadium has a maximum capacity of 1,600 with 150 seats, after adding a stand and floodlights during the summer of 2009 when the club were elected into the Highland League.
