= Bellslea Park =

Football ground in Fraserburgh, Scotland

Coordinates: 57°41′24″N 2°0′14″W

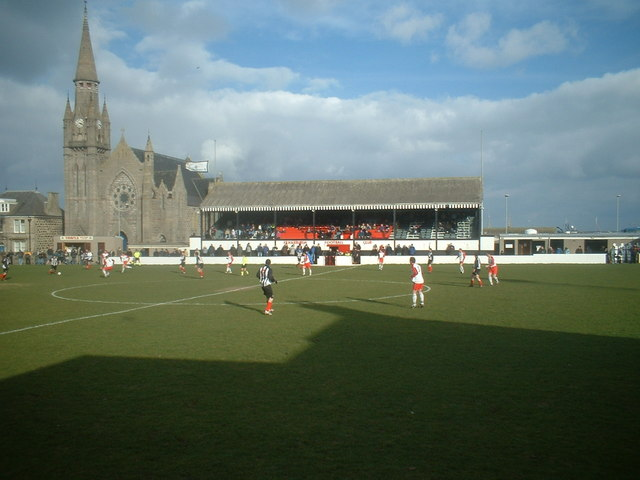
- Bellslea Park, overlooked by Fraserburgh South Kirk

- Location within Aberdeenshire
- Location: Seaforth Street, Fraserburgh, Aberdeenshire, Scotland
- Owner: Fraserburgh F.C.
- Capacity: 3,000 (480 seats)
- Record attendance: 5,800 v Heart of Midlothian; 13 February 1954
- Field size: 101m x 60m

Construction
- Built: 1909

Tenant
- Fraserburgh F.C. (1910–present)

Bellslea Park is a football ground in Fraserburgh in north-east Scotland, which is the home ground of Highland Football League side Fraserburgh. It is located on Seaforth Street in the centre of the town and has a capacity of 3,000 with 480 seated.

== History ==
Fraserburgh F.C. was formed in 1910 and have always played their home games at Bellslea Park. Prior to the football club playing their games at the ground, the site was a public park and hosted football games of other local clubs from around the town. In 1909, maintenance work began and a perimeter wall was added around the site. The first match played on the ground was in December 1909 in a match between Fraserburgh Thistle and Ellon United in the Aberdeenshire Cup. The current Grandstand was built in 1921 in preparation for entering the Highland League.

Fraserburgh's record attendance at Bellslea Park came in February 1954 when 5,800 spectators watched the club take on Heart of Midlothian of Edinburgh in the second round of the Scottish Cup. The home side lost 3–0 to the top division side.

== Transport ==
The nearest railway station to the ground is in Aberdeen, around 37.5 miles (60.4 km) to the south of the town.
