= Peterhead F.C. =

Association football club in Scotland

Peterhead
- Full name: Peterhead Football Club
- Nickname: The Blue Toon
- Founded: 1891; 135 years ago
- Ground: Balmoor, Peterhead
- Capacity: 3,150 (1,000 seated)
- Coordinates: 57.511145°N 1.795877°W
- Chairman: Rodger Morrison
- Co-managers: Jordon Brown; Ryan Strachan
- League: Scottish League One
- 2025–26: Scottish League One, 5th of 10
- Website: www.peterheadfc.org
Home colours	Away colours

Peterhead Football Club are a football club based in Peterhead, Aberdeenshire, Scotland. They currently play in Scottish League One, after being promoted in the 2024–25 season.

== History ==
The club was founded in 1891. The club was a Highland League club for most of its history.

The club were granted league status in 2000 when the SPL was expanded to twelve clubs leaving two places to be filled; Elgin City joined them in the Third Division from the Highland League.

Jim McInally was appointed on 7 October 2011 following the sacking of John Sheran on 23 September 2011 after the side won one game in 17 matches.

On 20 January 2013, Peterhead hosted Rangers, a game watched by 4,855 spectators. This remains Balmoor's all-time record attendance, with approximately 400 more fans than the previous fixture.

On 18 April 2014, Peterhead clinched their first trophy as a Scottish Football League club by winning the Scottish League Two title, beating Clyde 2–0 at Broadwood Stadium.

On 14 November 2015, Peterhead reached their first cup final since leaving the Highland League, beating Queen's Park to reach the Scottish Challenge Cup final. The club were beaten 4–0 by Rangers at Hampden Park.

== Ground ==
Peterhead's home ground is Balmoor, which has a capacity of 3,150, of which around 1,000 are seated.

== Rivals ==
Peterhead's traditional rivals are the Highland League team Fraserburgh; however, since their election to the Scottish Football League in 2000 this rivalry has waned; they now have a new rivalry with Elgin City.

== Honours ==
Scottish League Two Champions: (3) 2013–14, 2018–19, 2024–25

Scottish Challenge Cup Runners-up: (1) 2015–16

Highland League Winners: (5) 1946–47, 1948–49, 1949–50, 1988–89, 1998–99

Highland League Cup Winners: (5) 1962–63, 1965–66, 1967–68, 1980–81, 1988–89

Scottish Qualifying Cup (North) Winners: (6) 1946–47, 1975–76, 1977–78, 1978–79, 1985–86, 1997–98

Aberdeenshire Cup Winners: (20) 1905–06, 1934–35, 1935–36, 1946–47, 1948–49, 1949–50, 1958–59, 1962–63, 1964–65, 1967–68, 1968–69, 1969–70, 1970–71, 1974–75, 1976–77, 1978–79, 1984–85, 1987–88, 1988–89, 1998–99

Aberdeenshire Shield Winners: (2) 1998–99, 2009–10

Scottish Week Challenge Cup Winners: (3) 2011, 2012, 2013, 2026

== Club records ==
Biggest win: 17–0 v Fort William 1998

Biggest home defeat: 0–10 v Fraserburgh 1974

Biggest away defeat: 0–13 v Aberdeen (Scottish Cup in 1923–24)

Record home attendance (Recreation Park): 8,643 v Raith Rovers (Scottish Cup, 25 February 1987)

Record home attendance (Balmoor Stadium): 4,885 v Rangers (Third Division, 20 January 2013)

== Players ==
=== First-team squad ===
As of 1 October 2026

Note: Flags indicate national team as defined under FIFA eligibility rules; some limited exceptions apply. Players may hold more than one non-FIFA nationality.

No.	Pos.	Nation	Player
1	GK	SCO	Jack Newman
2	DF	SCO	Danny Strachan
3	DF	SCO	Tobias Davies-Browne
4	DF	SCO	Archie Graham (on loan from Stenhousemuir)
5	DF	SCO	Jason Brown (captain)
6	MF	SCO	Blair Yule
7	FW	SCO	Lyall Keir
8	MF	SCO	Andy McCarthy
9	FW	SCO	Mitch Megginson
10	MF	SCO	Bobby McLuckie (on loan from Greenock Morton)
11	MF	IRL	Cieran Dunne
13	GK	SCO	Lewis McKelvie
15	MF	SCO	James Stokes

No.	Pos.	Nation	Player
17	FW	SCO	Cammy Smith
18	FW	SCO	Zak To (on loan from Aberdeen)
19	MF	SCO	Peter Pawlett
21	MF	SCO	Dylan Forrest
22	MF	SCO	Seb Ross
24	FW	SCO	Jack Searle (on loan from Aberdeen)
25	MF	SCO	Jack Robertson (co-operation loan with St Johnstone)
28	MF	SCO	Jordon Brown
29	DF	SCO	Benny-Jackson Luyeye
31	GK	SCO	Craig Hepburn (co-operation loan with St Johnstone)
34	MF	ERI	Robel Teklemichael
46	DF	SCO	Josh Kerr

=== On loan ===
Note: Flags indicate national team as defined under FIFA eligibility rules; some limited exceptions apply. Players may hold more than one non-FIFA nationality.

No.	Pos.	Nation	Player
12	MF	SCO	Jack Brown (on loan at Formartine United)
14	FW	SCO	Adam Carnwath (on loan at Cowdenbeath)
23	FW	SCO	Fraser Mackie (on loan at Fraserburgh)

== Club officials ==
=== Coaching staff ===
- Co-managers: Jordon Brown and Ryan Strachan
- First team coach: Peter Pawlett
- Goalkeeping coach: John Farquhar
- Physiotherapists: Donal Gallagher, Leona Simpson
- Student Physiotherapists: Charley Henderson, Emma Morrison
- Sports analyst: Josh McCrindle

=== Board ===
- Chairman: Rodger Morrison
- Directors: Martin Booth, Billy Duncan, Charlie Watt

== Managers ==
- (Scotland) Colin Grant (1976–1980)
- (Scotland) Dennis D'Arcy (1980–1981)
- (Scotland) Joe Harper (1981–1982)
- (Scotland) Dave Smith (1982–1983)
- (Scotland) Jim Hamilton (1983–1990)
- (Scotland) George Adams (1990–1991)
- (Scotland) Jim Guyan (1991–1993)
- (Scotland) Ian Wilson (1993–1994)
- (Scotland) David Watson (1994–1995)
- (Scotland) Ian Wilson (1995–1998)
- (Scotland) Ronnie Brown (1998–2000)
- (Scotland) Ian Wilson (2000–2004)
- (Scotland) Iain Stewart (2004–2006)
- (Scotland) Steve Paterson (2006–2008)
- (Scotland) Neale Cooper (2008–2011)
- (Scotland) John Sheran (2011)
- (Scotland) Jim McInally (2011–2022)
- (Scotland) David Robertson (2022–2023)
- (Scotland) Jordon Brown and (Scotland) Ryan Strachan (2023–present)

* Prior to Colin Grant's appointment the team was picked by committee.
