= Cove Rangers F.C. =

Association football club in Aberdeen, Scotland

Cove Rangers
- Full name: Cove Rangers Football Club
- Nickname: The Toonsers
- Founded: 1922; 104 years ago
- Ground: Balmoral Stadium, Altens, Aberdeen
- Capacity: 2,602 (410 seated)
- Coordinates: 57.112926°N 2.096731°W
- Chairman: Keith Moorhouse
- Manager: Paul Hartley
- League: Scottish League One
- 2025–26: Scottish League One, 7th of 10
- Website: coverangersfc.com
Home colours	Away colours	Third colours

Cove Rangers Football Club is a senior Scottish football club currently playing in Scottish League One. They are based in the Altens area of Aberdeen and play their football at Balmoral Stadium, having left their former home at Allan Park, Cove Bay in April 2015.

== History ==
Cove were formed in 1922 and played in the local amateur leagues until 1985, when they became a junior team. However, the club applied and were accepted to the senior Highland Football League in 1986, where they played for 33 seasons. They have also racked up a formidable reputation in the lower rounds of the Scottish Cup, reaching the 3rd round three times. In 2001 they won their first Highland League championship – but even more impressively won the 'treble' of Highland League, Aberdeenshire Shield and Scottish Qualifying Cup.

In the 2007–08 season, Cove reached round four of the Scottish Cup for the first time, beating Brora Rangers away 5–0, Keith 3–0 and Edinburgh University 1–0 on the way, before losing 4–2 to Ross County.

However, the south Aberdeen side claimed their second ever Highland League Championship with a 3–0 home win against Lossiemouth on 3 May 2008.

Cove Rangers were one of the clubs who prepared an application for entry into the Scottish Football League following Gretna relinquishing their league status on 3 June 2008. The other clubs were Annan Athletic, Preston Athletic and Spartans. Annan Athletic were eventually awarded the place, due to their superior facilities.

One of the club's most famous players is the young Scottish midfielder Paul Coutts who joined English League One club Peterborough United during the summer of 2008 for a nominal fee. Coutts won the club's Young Player of the Year award for the 2008–09 season and won eight caps for the Scotland under-21 squad, after being touted for a call up by his former manager Darren Ferguson.

In 2016 the club regained their Highland League crown. Due to the introduction of the 'pyramid system' in Scottish football, Cove elected to say goodbye to their Allan Park home due to the stadium not meeting SPFL minimum stadia requirements. This in turn meant the club played all of their games at an away ground with Inverurie Locos, Formartine United and Banks O'Dee offering the use of their facilities so the club could compete. Cove went on to win the league and advance to the first play-off game against the winner of the Lowland League, Edinburgh City. The tie was won by City 4–1 on aggregate who subsequently progressed to Scottish League Two after beating East Stirlingshire in the second playoff tie.

=== Back to back promotions and rise to League One ===
In the 2018–19 season they were promoted to SPFL League Two for the first time in their history after defeating Berwick Rangers 7–0 on aggregate in the League Two play-off.

In their first season in the SPFL, they won League Two after the season was terminated early due to the Coronavirus pandemic. This resulted in back-to-back promotions for Cove, with the club gaining promotion to SPFL League One for the first time.

=== Promotion to the Championship ===
In their first League One campaign, Cove narrowly lost out on promotion by 4 points to eventual winners Partick Thistle, finishing 3rd in the League and losing 4–3 on aggregate to Airdrieonians in the Play-offs.

In the 2021–22 season, Cove won the League One title by 7 points, only losing 3 league games all season, securing promotion to the Scottish Championship for the first time in their history. This meant that Cove Rangers achieved three promotions in four seasons: from the Highland League in 2019, League Two in 2020, and League One in 2022.

The 2022–23 Championship season saw Cove go into their final match against Greenock Morton one point ahead of Hamilton Academical at the bottom, however a 1–2 defeat at a foggy Balmoral Stadium coupled with a goalless draw for Hamilton at Arbroath meant that both Cove and Hamilton finished level on points but Cove were relegated to League One after just one season due to an inferior goal difference.

== Stadium ==
From 1948 to 2015, Cove played at Allan Park, which was located in Cove. The ground had a capacity of 2300 spectators, with 200 on seats or benches. Its largest attendance was 2,100, in the league playoff in 2008–09 vs Deveronvale which they won 3–1 to lift the league title for the third year running. Allan Park was named after a local farmer, who sold the club the land on which they built the ground in 1948.

On Friday, 30 July 2010, an article was placed in the local Aberdeen paper, the Evening Express that Stewart Milne, the chairman of Aberdeen, had bought Allan Park. This scheme was thrown into doubt, however, when Aberdeen City Council rejected an application by the two clubs to build a new ground for Cove Rangers that Aberdeen would also have used as a training ground. Nevertheless, on 18 April 2015, Cove Rangers played their final game at Allan Park following progress being made with Aberdeen City Council in terms of planning permission. In this game Cove marked their departure with a 4–0 victory over Fort William. Allan Park had been bought by housing developers for a figure believed to be around the £3m mark. The sale also included a social club, also owned by the football club, which closed its doors the following day.

Cove then began construction of their revised new stadium. The new facility, known as Balmoral Stadium, is located in Altens, next to a new secondary school, with the merging of Kincorth and Torry Academies into one larger school. In a clause made by Aberdeen City Council, this new school will have access to the new stadium's artificial pitch.

In July 2018, Cove moved into the Balmoral Stadium, having played home games at Inverurie Loco Works' ground in the intervening period. The first match at the Balmoral Stadium took place on 16 July 2018, but had to be abandoned after a Cove player was seriously injured.

== Honours ==
- Scottish League One
  - Winners: 2021–22
- Scottish League Two
  - Winners: 2019–20
- Highland Football League
  - Winners (7): 2000–01, 2007–08, 2008–09, 2012–13, 2015–16, 2017–18, 2018–19
- Highland League Cup
  - Winners (6): 1994–95, 1999–00, 2004–05, 2014–15, 2016–17, 2018–19
- Aberdeenshire Cup
  - Winners (3): 2001–02, 2010–11, 2018–19
- Aberdeenshire Shield
  - Winners (4): 1990–91, 2000–01, 2008–09, 2017–18
- Scottish Qualifying Cup (North)
  - Winners (2): 1990–91, 2000–01
- Aberdeenshire League
  - Winners (6): 2000–01, 2008–09, 2010–11, 2011–12, 2012–13, 2014–15
- Inter-League Trophy
  - Winners: 2001–02
- North Junior League First Division
  - Winners: 1985–86

== Current squad ==
As of 21 August 2026

Note: Flags indicate national team as defined under FIFA eligibility rules; some limited exceptions apply. Players may hold more than one non-FIFA nationality.

No.	Pos.	Nation	Player
1	GK	SCO	Robbie Mutch
2	DF	SCO	Layton Bisland
3	DF	SCO	Dylan Ross (co-operation loan with Aberdeen)
4	DF	ENG	Afonso Lindo
6	DF	SCO	Jamie Mercer (co-operation loan with Aberdeen)
7	DF	WAL	Ryan Harrington
8	MF	ENG	Ackeme Francis-Burrell
9	FW	NGR	Destiny Oladipo
10	MF	SCO	Max Barry
11	MF	SCO	Reuben McAllister
12	FW	SCO	Miller Keir (on loan from Inverness CT)

No.	Pos.	Nation	Player
14	MF	SCO	Joe Chalmers (on loan from Inverness CT)
15	DF	SCO	Arron Darge (vice-captain)
16	FW	SCO	Joseph Teasdale (co-operation loan with Aberdeen)
18	FW	ITA	Edimond Oppong
20	MF	SCO	Aaron Fraser
21	GK	HUN	Balint Demus
22	DF	NGR	Victor Enem
25	MF	SCO	Mikey Milnes
26	FW	SCO	Jordan White (captain)
32	DF	SCO	Liam Parker
77	FW	SCO	Chris Maguire

=== On loan ===
Note: Flags indicate national team as defined under FIFA eligibility rules; some limited exceptions apply. Players may hold more than one non-FIFA nationality.

No.	Pos.	Nation	Player
17	FW	SCO	Tristan Stephen (on loan at Turriff United)
19	MF	SCO	Cole Donaldson (on loan at Inverurie Loco Works)

No.	Pos.	Nation	Player
23	GK	SCO	Jack Robertson (on loan at Inverurie Loco Works)

== Club officials ==
=== Technical staff ===
- Football manager: Paul Hartley
- Assistant manager: Greg Stewart
- Goalkeeping coach: Derek Soutar
- Performance analyst: Adam Ponton
- Physiotherapist: Conor O'Hagan
- Sports scientist: Thomas Morrison
- Kit manager: Kevin Grant

=== Management ===
- Honorary president: Alan McRae
- Chairman: Keith Moorhouse
- Vice-chairman: Graeme Reid
- Director: Darren Anderson
- Director: Grant Moorhouse
- Director: Willie Young

The club's honorary president Alan McRae served as SFA president from 2015 to 2019.

Ref:
