= Rothes F.C. =

Association football club in Scotland

Rothes
- Full name: Rothes Football Club
- Nickname: The Speysiders
- Founded: 1907 as Rothes Victoria; 1938 as Rothes
- Ground: Mackessack Park, Rothes
- Capacity: 1,731 (167 seated)
- Coordinates: 57.5307°N 3.2047°W
- Chairman: Iain Paul
- Manager: Ryan Esson
- League: Highland League
- 2025–26: Highland League, 18th of 18
- Website: https://www.rothesfc.co.uk/
Home colours	Away colours

Rothes Football Club is a Scottish football club based in the town of Rothes in Moray and currently play in the Highland League. The club was originally founded in 1907 as a Junior club, Rothes Victoria, before turning senior on 4 May 1938 as Rothes FC, obtaining a place in the Highland Football League.

They play in tangerine shirts, colours they inherited from Dundee United after purchasing the floodlights from Tannadice Park.

Rothes have won the Highland League once, in the 1958–59 season. In 2020, The Speysiders won their first honours in 41 years, defeating Buckie Thistle 2–1 in the Highland League Cup final to win the trophy for the first time.

The club's Mackessack Park ground is named after one Douglas Mackessack, a local laird and whisky magnate and an early benefactor of the club.

== Honours ==
- Highland Football League
  - Champions: 1958–59
- Highland League Cup
  - Winners: 2019–20
- North of Scotland Cup
  - Winners: 1958–59, 1978–79, 2021–22
- Campbell Charity Cup
  - Winners: 1949–50
