= Steven Mackay =

Scottish footballer and manager

Personal information
- Date of birth: 26 June 1981 (age 45)
- Place of birth: Inverness, Scotland
- Positions: Striker; full-back

Team information
- Current team: Brora Rangers (manager)

Senior career*
Years	Team	Apps	(Gls)
1998–2005	Ross County	92	(4)
2000	→ Elgin City (loan)	5	(0)
2002	→ Elgin City (loan)	11	(2)
2005–2006	Forres Mechanics	32	(16)
2006–2007	Elgin City	35	(4)
2007–2008	Peterhead	17	(2)
2008–2009	Elgin City	38	(3)
2009–2012	Nairn County	115	(86)
2012–2020	Brora Rangers	246	(210)
2020–2020	→ Invergordon (loan)	3	(1)
2022–2022	Rothes	11	(3)
2022–2024	Nairn County	15	(2)
Total		611	(326)

Managerial career
- 2018–2021: Brora Rangers
- 2021–2022: Elgin City (assistant)
- 2022–2024: Nairn County
- 2024–: Brora Rangers
- * Club domestic league appearances and goals as of 18 May 2024

Steven Mackay (born 26 June 1981) is a Scottish football manager and former player and is currently manager of Highland Football League side Brora Rangers.

== Playing career ==
Mackay began his career with Ross County, for whom he made 92 appearances over seven seasons in the Scottish League, which included five seasons in the First Division. He also played in the lower divisions of the league for Elgin City and Peterhead, and for Highland League clubs Forres Mechanics and Nairn County.

He signed for Brora Rangers in 2012, and won the Highland League title with them in the 2013–14 season and 2014-15 season. In the play offs Brora won the chance for promotion to the Scottish Football League for the first time in their history, but with Brora ahead Mackay was sent off and they lost. He then won the Highland League Cup with the club the following year and won the North of Scotland Cup on 4 occasions as a Brora player.

Mackay briefly had a one-month loan spell at the end of 2020 with North Caledonian League club Invergordon F.C. with Brora Rangers season yet to start. He retired from playing duties to focus on management in December 2020 following a 5–1 victory over Wick Academy in which he scored the last of his 210 goals for the club.

Mackay briefly came out of retirement during the 2022-23 season to play for Rothes. During his time at the club, he played in 11 matches scoring 3 times.

Mackay came out of retirement again during his spell as Nairn County manager. Due to a scarcity of left-back options at the club, Mackay filled in a left back for the club at the age of 42.

== Managerial career ==
Brora Rangers

Mackay became player-manager at Brora Rangers in May 2018. In his first year, the club finished second in the 2018–19 season behind winners Cove Rangers. Mackay lead the club to another North of Scotland Cup and his first trophy as manager, beating Inverness Caledonian Thistle 3–2 in the final.

In his second season in charge of Brora Rangers he was named Highland League Manager of The Year as the club were awarded the title following a vote of the league's member clubs in the incomplete 2019–20 season due to the coronavirus pandemic.

In his third season, Brora recorded a significant upset in the 2020–21 Scottish Cup by beating runaway Championship leaders and the previous season's Scottish Cup finalists, Heart of Midlothian, 2–1 at Dudgeon Park. The result has been described as one of Scotland's biggest cup shocks of all time. The club were awarded the title for the incomplete 2020–21 Highland League season due to the coronavirus pandemic, qualifying them for the Scottish League Two playoffs and a chance for promotion. They were beaten in the playoffs by Kelty Hearts 6–1 on aggregate.

On 6 June 2021, the club announced that Mackay and his backroom staff had signed 2-year contract extensions. On 7 August 2021, Mackay announced his resignation from his position following a 6-2 league defeat to Fraserburgh. The Brora chairman, William Powrie, commented "He's been a great servant to the club both as a player and a manager, but he felt he'd taken the club as far as he could."

Elgin City

On 20 August 2021, Mackay became assistant manager at Scottish League Two club Elgin City on a two-year contract. MacKay said on the club's website: "I'm delighted to join Elgin City as assistant manager having played here when I was younger." In June 2022, Mackay stepped down from his role with Elgin due to other work commitments.

Nairn County

On 4 October 2022, Mackay was appointed as manager of Highland League club Nairn County on a deal up to 2025.

On 12 November 2023, Mackay led the club to their first piece of silverware in 11 years, coming from behind to beat Ross County 5-4 (a.e.t) in the final of the North of Scotland Cup.

Brora Rangers

On 29 April 2024, Mackay was appointed as manager of Highland Football League club Brora Rangers.

== Personal life ==
In June 2020, Mackay completed an 80-mile charity run, from his house in Inverness to Dudgeon Park via Bonar Bridge, raising nearly £16,000 for the MFR Cash for Kids charity. He completed the challenge in just over 18 hours, backed by his Brora Rangers management team.

In June 2021, Mackay completed a 104-mile, four marathon challenge run, from Harmsworth Park in Wick to Bught Park in Inverness. He completed the challenge in 23 hours and 39 minutes, raising over £20,000 for the MFR Cash for Kids charity.

On 20 May 2022, Mackay started a 516-mile charity run, aiming to be completed in 10 days around the North Coast 500. Mackay had to switch to bicycle due to injury but completed the challenge, 218 miles on foot and 298 miles on bike, raising over £45,000 for the MFR Cash for Kids charity.

== Honours ==
=== Player ===
Ross County

- Third Division (fourth tier): 1998–99

Nairn County

- Highland League Cup: 2010-11
- North of Scotland Cup: 2023-24

Brora Rangers

- Highland Football League: 2013–14, 2014–15
- Highland League Cup: 2015–16
- North of Scotland Cup: 2013–14, 2014–15, 2016–17, 2017–18

=== Manager ===
Brora Rangers

- Highland Football League: 2019–20*, 2020–21*,2024-25, 2025-26
- Highland League Cup: 2024-25
- North of Scotland Cup: 2019-20, 2024-25

Nairn County

- North of Scotland Cup: 2023-24

=== Individual ===
- Highland Football League Manager of The Year: 2019-20 2024-25

*Awarded following a vote of the league's member clubs. Seasons 2019–20 and 2020–21 were incomplete due to the coronavirus pandemic.
