= Alisdair Sutherland =

Scottish footballer (born 1996)

Personal information
- Date of birth: 19 September 1996 (age 30)
- Place of birth: Brora, Scotland
- Position: Forward

Team information
- Current team: Brora Rangers

Youth career
- Inverness Caledonian Thistle

Senior career*
| Years | Team | Apps | (Gls) |
| 2014–2017 | Inverness Caledonian Thistle | 8 | (0) |
| 2016 | → Brora Rangers (loan) | | |
| 2017–2019 | Elgin City | 42 | (0) |
| 2018 | → Rothes (loan) | 12 | (4) |
| 2019–2021 | Rothes | 22 | (9) |
| 2021– | Brora Rangers | 0 | (0) |
- * Club domestic league appearances and goals as of 01:10, 13 July 2021 (UTC)

Alisdair "Ali" Sutherland (born 19 September 1996) is a Scottish professional footballer who plays as a forward for Highland League club Brora Rangers.

== Career ==
Born in Brora, Sutherland began his career at Inverness Caledonian Thistle, making his senior debut in January 2015. He spent time on loan at Highland League club Brora Rangers during the second half of the 2015–16 season, and signed his first professional contract with Inverness Caledonian Thistle at the end of that season.

After being released by Caley Thistle in January 2017, Sutherland signed for Scottish League Two side Elgin City on a deal until the end of the 2016–17 season, subsequently signing a new contract in June 2017.

After a loan spell with the club, Sutherland signed a deal with Highland League side Rothes. Sutherland helped the Speysiders finish 3rd in the league and win the Highland League Cup, the club's first silverware in 41 years.

In March 2021, Sutherland returned to his hometown club Brora Rangers on a three-year deal.

== Career statistics ==
As of 10 July 2021

| Club | Season | League | | | FA Cup | | League Cup | | Other | | Total | |
| Club | Season | Division | Apps | Goals | Apps | Goals | Apps | Goals | Apps | Goals | Apps | Goals |
|---|---|---|---|---|---|---|---|---|---|---|---|---|
| Inverness Caledonian Thistle | 2014–15 | Scottish Premiership | 2 | 0 | 0 | 0 | 0 | 0 | 0 | 0 | 2 | 0 |
| Inverness Caledonian Thistle | 2015–16 | Scottish Premiership | 5 | 0 | 0 | 0 | 1 | 0 | 0 | 0 | 6 | 0 |
| Inverness Caledonian Thistle | 2016–17 | Scottish Premiership | 1 | 0 | 0 | 0 | 1 | 0 | 0 | 0 | 2 | 0 |
| Inverness Caledonian Thistle | Total | | 8 | 0 | 0 | 0 | 2 | 0 | 0 | 0 | 10 | 0 |
| Elgin City | 2016–17 | Scottish League Two | 13 | 0 | 0 | 0 | 0 | 0 | 0 | 0 | 13 | 0 |
| Elgin City | 2017–18 | Scottish League Two | 20 | 0 | 2 | 1 | 4 | 0 | 2 | 0 | 28 | 1 |
| Elgin City | 2018–19 | Scottish League Two | 9 | 0 | 0 | 0 | 1 | 0 | 1 | 0 | 11 | 0 |
| Elgin City | Total | | 42 | 0 | 2 | 1 | 5 | 0 | 3 | 0 | 52 | 1 |
| Rothes (loan) | 2018–19 | Highland League | 12 | 4 | 2 | 0 | 0 | 0 | 1 | 0 | 15 | 4 |
| Rothes | 2019–20 | Highland League | 22 | 9 | 2 | 2 | 0 | 0 | 3 | 2 | 27 | 13 |
| Rothes | 2020–21 | Highland League | 0 | 0 | 0 | 0 | 0 | 0 | 2 | 1 | 2 | 1 |
| Rothes | Total | | 22 | 9 | 2 | 2 | 0 | 0 | 5 | 3 | 29 | 14 |
| Brora Rangers | 2020–21 | Highland League | 0 | 0 | 0 | 0 | 0 | 0 | 2 | 0 | 2 | 0 |
| Brora Rangers | 2021–22 | Highland League | 0 | 0 | 0 | 0 | 1 | 0 | 0 | 0 | 1 | 0 |
| Brora Rangers | Total | | 0 | 0 | 0 | 0 | 1 | 0 | 2 | 0 | 3 | 0 |
| Career total | | | 84 | 13 | 6 | 3 | 8 | 0 | 11 | 3 | 109 | 19 |

== Honours ==
Rothes

- Highland League Cup: 2019–20
