= 2016–17 Inverness Caledonian Thistle F.C. season =

Scottish football club season

Inverness Caledonian Thistle
2016–17 season
- Chairman: Kenny Cameron
- Manager: Richie Foran
- Stadium: Caledonian Stadium
- Premiership: Twelfth place (relegated)
- League Cup: Second round, lost to Alloa Athletic
- Scottish Cup: Fifth round, lost to Celtic
- Top goalscorer: League: Alex Fisher (8); All: Alex Fisher (8)
- Highest home attendance: 7,012 vs. Rangers, 14 October 2016
- Lowest home attendance: 1,316 vs. Arbroath, 30 July 2016
- Average home league attendance: 3,949
Home colours	Away colours

The 2016–17 Inverness Caledonian Thistle F.C. season is the club's fourth season in the Scottish Premiership and their seventh consecutive season in the top division of Scottish football. Caley Thistle also competed in the Scottish League Cup and the Scottish Cup.

== Summary ==
=== Season ===
Caley Thistle finished twelfth in the Scottish Premiership and were automatically relegated to the Scottish Championship. They reached the second round of the Scottish League Cup, the fifth round of the Scottish Cup.

=== Management ===
Caley Thistle were managed by Richie Foran, during the 2016–17 season. John Hughes departed the club during the close season on 20 May 2016, having negotiated his exit with the board. Hughes had previously raised concerns with the club's budget for 2016–17. On 30 May 2016, Foran was appointed manager on a four-year contract, marking his retirement as a player. Brian Rice remained as assistant manager.

== Results and fixtures ==
Win Draw Loss Postponed

=== Friendlies ===
2 July 2016 Friendly/William West Testimonial	Fraserburgh	3–3	Inverness CT	Fraserburgh
15:00				Stadium: Bellslea Park

5 July 2016 Friendly	Brora Rangers	1–1	Inverness CT	Brora
19:30				Stadium: Dudgeon Park

7 July 2016 Friendly	Nairn County	0–3	Inverness CT	Nairn
19:30				Stadium: Station Park

9 July 2016 Friendly/Andy Low Testimonial	Buckie Thistle	1–8	Inverness CT	Buckie
14:00				Stadium: Victoria Park

10 July 2016 Friendly	Clachnacuddin	1–3	Inverness CT	Inverness
12:00				Stadium: Grant Street Park

12 July 2016 Friendly	Elgin City	0–3	Inverness CT	Elgin
19:45				Stadium: Borough Briggs

19 July 2016 Friendly	Forres Mechanics	1–3	Inverness CT	Forres
19:30				Stadium: Mosset Park

=== Scottish Premiership ===
6 August 2016 Premiership	Partick Thistle	2–0	Inverness Caledonian Thistle	Glasgow
15:00	Gordon (yellow card) 5'; Amoo (yellow card) 24' (goal) 60'; Erskine 36'	BBC Report	Polworth (yellow card) 69'	Stadium: Firhill Stadium; Attendance: 2,943; Referee: Walsh

13 August 2016 Premiership	Inverness Caledonian Thistle	2–3	Ross County	Inverness
15:00	Raven (yellow card) 12'; Williams (yellow card) 18'; Boden 45'; Draper (yellow card) 50' (goal) 65'; Horner (yellow card) 75'	BBC Report	Boyce 7' 28' 47'; Curran (yellow card) 28'; Davies (yellow card) 75'; Foster (yellow card) 80'; Gardyne (yellow card) 82'; Routis (yellow card) 85'	Stadium: Tulloch Caledonian Stadium; Attendance: 4,204; Referee: Dallas

20 August 2016 Premiership	Heart of Midlothian	5–1	Inverness Caledonian Thistle	Edinburgh
15:00	Cowie 7' 47'; Sammon 18'; Kitchen (yellow card) 29'; Nicholson 78' 79'	BBC Report	Tremarco (yellow card) 10'; Mulraney (yellow card) 12'; Polworth (yellow card) 40'; Horner (yellow card) 77'; Draper 87'	Stadium: Tynecastle Stadium; Attendance: 15,880; Referee: McLean

27 August 2016 Premiership	Inverness Caledonian Thistle	2–1	St Johnstone	Inverness
15:00	Draper 59' (yellow card) 67'; Meekings 90+1'; Warren (yellow card) 90+2'	BBC Report	Wotherspoon (yellow card) 58'; Foster 79'	Stadium: Tulloch Caledonian Stadium; Attendance: 2,729; Referee: Finnie

10 September 2016 Premiership	Aberdeen	1–1	Inverness Caledonian Thistle	Aberdeen
15:00	McGinn 51'	BBC Report	Tansey (yellow card) 31'; Tremarco (yellow card) 45'; King (yellow card) 45+1'; Vigurs 68'	Stadium: Pittodrie Stadium; Attendance: 11,356; Referee: Allan

18 September 2016 Premiership	Inverness Caledonian Thistle	2–2	Celtic	Inverness
15:00	King 28'; Fisher 89'	BBC Report	Rogić 17'; Sinclair 34'	Stadium: Tulloch Caledonian Stadium; Attendance: 6,061; Referee: Allan

24 September 2016 Premiership	Inverness Caledonian Thistle	3–1	Dundee	Inverness
15:00	Doumbouya 8'; Tansey 17'; Polworth 51'	BBC report	Low 84'	Stadium: Tulloch Caledonian Stadium; Attendance: 2,884; Referee: Allan

1 October 2016 Premiership	Hamilton Academical	1–1	Inverness Caledonian Thistle	Hamilton
15:00	D'Acol 18'; MacKinnon (yellow card) 81'; Imrie (yellow card) 86'	BBC report	Doumbouya (yellow card) 62'; Polworth 90+3'	Stadium: New Douglas Park; Attendance: 1,611; Referee: Cook

14 October 2016 Premiership	Inverness Caledonian Thistle	0–1	Rangers	Inverness
19:45	McKay (yellow card) 33'; Draper (yellow card) 51'; Warren (yellow card) 84'	BBC report	Miller 22'; Waghorn (yellow card) 51'	Stadium: Tulloch Caledonian Stadium; Attendance: 7,012; Referee: Collum

22 October 2016 Premiership	Inverness Caledonian Thistle	1–1	Kilmarnock	Inverness
15:00	Polworth (yellow card) 63'; Meekings (yellow card) 80'; Doumbouya 86'; Vigurs (yellow card) 90+4'	BBC report	Coulibaly 7' (pen.); Boyd (yellow card) 26'; Hendrie (yellow card) 88'	Stadium: Tulloch Caledonian Stadium; Attendance: 2,591; Referee: Walsh

26 October 2016 Premiership	Motherwell	0–3	Inverness Caledonian Thistle	Motherwell
19:45		BBC report	Tremarco 57' (yellow card) 86'; Doumbouya 71'; Polworth 83'	Stadium: Fir Park; Attendance: 3,131; Referee: Robertson

29 October 2016 Premiership	Inverness Caledonian Thistle	3–3	Heart of Midlothian	Inverness
15:00	Raven 15'; Doumbouya 32'; Doran 55'; Meekings (yellow card) 79'; McKay (yellow card) 85'; Vigurs (yellow card) 86'	BBC report	Johnsen 38'; Rherras (yellow card) 50' (goal) 51'; Djoum 74'; Kitchen (yellow card) 90+2'	Stadium: Tulloch Caledonian Stadium; Attendance: 3,565; Referee: Thomson

5 November 2016 Premiership	Celtic	3–0	Inverness Caledonian Thistle	Glasgow
15:00	Sinclair 48'; Griffiths 63'; Rogic 83'	BBC report	Tansey (yellow card) 43' (yellow-red card)	Stadium: Celtic Park; Attendance: 54,152; Referee: Allan

19 November 2016 Premiership	Inverness Caledonian Thistle	1–3	Aberdeen	Inverness
15:00	Doumbouya 15'; Vigurs (yellow card) 54'	BBC report	McLean 28' 89'; Rooney 33' (pen.); Maddison (yellow card) 68'	Stadium: Tulloch Caledonian Stadium; Attendance: 4,867; Referee: Clancy

26 November 2016 Premiership	Dundee	2–1	Inverness Caledonian Thistle	Dundee
15:00	Wighton 25'; Vincent (yellow card) 57'; Gadzhalov 60'; Hateley (yellow card) 78'; O'Dea (yellow card) 90+2'	BBC report	Tremarco 81'; Cole (yellow card) 85'; Horner (red card) 90+4'	Stadium: Dens Park; Attendance: 5,094; Referee: Dallas

3 December 2016 Premiership	St Johnstone	3–0	Inverness Caledonian Thistle	Perth
15:00	Craig 14'; Coulson (yellow card) 57'; Davidson 62'; Wotherspoon (yellow card) 75'; Swanson 81'	BBC report	Draper (yellow card) 45+1'; Doumbouya (yellow card) 51'; Warren (yellow card) 60' (yellow-red card)	Stadium: McDiarmid Park; Attendance: 2,549; Referee: Anderson

10 December 2016 Premiership	Inverness Caledonian Thistle	1–1	Hamilton Academical	Inverness
15:00	Draper (yellow card) 36'; Cole 51'; McKay (yellow card) 86'; King (yellow card) 90'	BBC report	Crawford 16'; Imrie (yellow card) 58'; Gillespie (yellow card) 74'; McMann (yellow card) 76'	Stadium: Tulloch Caledonian Stadium; Attendance: 2,473; Referee: Aitken

17 December 2016 Premiership	Kilmarnock	1–1	Inverness Caledonian Thistle	Kilmarnock
15:00	McKenzie (yellow card) 45+2'; Taylor (yellow card) 64'; Coulibaly 73'; Smith (yellow card) 90'	BBC report	Draper (yellow card) 16'; Warren 84'; Polworth (yellow card) 90+1'	Stadium: Rugby Park; Attendance: 3,294; Referee: Walsh

24 December 2016 Premiership	Rangers	1–0	Inverness Caledonian Thistle	Glasgow
12:30	McKay 13' (o.g.); Tavernier (yellow card) 43'	BBC report	Cole (yellow card) 37'; Vigurs (yellow card) 45+2'; Meekings (yellow card) 85'	Stadium: Ibrox Stadium; Attendance: 48,528; Referee: Robertson

28 December 2016 Premiership	Inverness Caledonian Thistle	1–2	Motherwell	Inverness
19:45	Cole (yellow card) 36'; McKay (yellow card) 40'; Fisher (yellow card) 77'; Vigurs (yellow card) 89'; Tansey 90'	BBC report	Clay 50'; Moult (yellow card) 59'; McDonald 87'	Stadium: Tulloch Caledonian Stadium; Attendance: 3,097; Referee: Cook

31 December 2016 Premiership	Ross County	3–2	Inverness Caledonian Thistle	Dingwall
15:00	Boyce 2' 35'; Woods 61'; McEveley (yellow card) 76'	BBC report	Tremarco 28'; Warren (yellow card) 46'; Fisher 81'; McKay (yellow card) 90+3'	Stadium: Global Energy Stadium; Attendance: 5,111; Referee: Madden

28 January 2017 Premiership	Inverness Caledonian Thistle	0–0	Partick Thistle	Inverness
15:00	Warren (yellow card) 66'; Henri Anier (yellow card) 73'	BBC report		Stadium: Tulloch Caledonian Stadium; Attendance: 2,823; Referee: Finnie

31 January 2017 Premiership	Hamilton Academical	3–0	Inverness Caledonian Thistle	Hamilton
19:45	D'Acol 11'; Devlin (yellow card) 26'; Redmond (yellow card) 32'; Gillespie 47'; MacKinnon (yellow card) 54'; Bingham 61'	BBC report	Vigurs (yellow card) 30'; Tansey (yellow card) 39'	Stadium: SuperSeal Stadium; Attendance: 1,745; Referee: Anderson

4 February 2017 Premiership	Inverness Caledonian Thistle	2–2	Dundee	Inverness
15:00	Billy Mckay 53' (pen.) (yellow card) 58'; Tremarco (yellow card) 75'; Tansey 79'	BBC report	Haber 37'; O'Dea 43' (yellow card) 48'; Julen Etxabeguren (yellow card) 52'; McGowan (yellow card) 63'	Stadium: Tulloch Caledonian Stadium; Attendance: 2,606; Referee: Walsh

18 February 2017 Premiership	Heart of Midlothian	1–1	Inverness Caledonian Thistle	Edinburgh
15:00	Djoum 64'	BBC report	Tremarco (yellow card) 15' (goal) 24'; Mulraney (yellow card) 36'; Raven (yellow card) 38'	Stadium: Tynecastle Stadium; Attendance: 16,372; Referee: Madden

24 February 2017 Premiership	Inverness Caledonian Thistle	2–1	Rangers	Inverness
19:45	Tansey 45' (yellow card) 66'; Laing (yellow card) 56'; Vigurs 86' (pen miss); Billy Mckay 89'	BBC report	Jon Toral (yellow card) 14'; Waghorn 67' (pen.); Wilson (yellow card) 86'	Stadium: Tulloch Caledonian Stadium; Attendance: 6,415; Referee: McLean

1 March 2017 Premiership	Inverness Caledonian Thistle	0–4	Celtic	Inverness
19:45	Laing (yellow card) 65'	BBC report	Sinclair 43'; Dembélé 46' 73'; Armstrong 66'	Stadium: Tulloch Caledonian Stadium; Attendance: 5,948; Referee: Dallas

11 March 2017 Premiership	Partick Thistle	1–1	Inverness Caledonian Thistle	Glasgow
15:00	Doolan 56'; Amoo (yellow card) 83'	BBC report	Vigurs (yellow card) 21'; McCart (yellow card) 45+3'; Warren 90+2'	Stadium: Firhill Stadium; Attendance: 3,082; Referee: Collum

18 March 2017 Premiership	Inverness Caledonian Thistle	1–1	Ross County	Inverness
15:00	Tansey 48'	BBC report	Schalk 86'	Stadium: Tulloch Caledonian Stadium; Attendance: 4,123; Referee: Allan

1 April 2017 Premiership	Inverness Caledonian Thistle	1–1	Kilmarnock	Inverness
15:00	Mckay 25'; Brad McKay (yellow card) 34'	BBC report	Boyd 19' (pen.); Dicker (yellow card) 76'	Stadium: Tulloch Caledonian Stadium; Attendance: 2,780; Referee: Madden

4 April 2017 Premiership	Aberdeen	1–0	Inverness Caledonian Thistle	Aberdeen
19:45	Warren 22' (o.g.)	BBC report	Billy Mckay (yellow card) 40'; Tremarco (yellow card) 66'	Stadium: Pittodrie Stadium; Attendance: 11,507; Referee: Dallas

8 April 2017 Premiership	Inverness Caledonian Thistle	0–3	St Johnstone	Inverness
15:00	Cole (yellow card) 81' (yellow-red card)	BBC report	MacLean 40'; Alston (yellow card) 65'; Craig 88' (pen.); Cummins 90+1'	Stadium: Tulloch Caledonian Stadium; Attendance: 2,961; Referee: Finnie

15 April 2017 Premiership	Motherwell	4–2	Inverness Caledonian Thistle	Motherwell
15:00	Cadden 7'; Moult 9'; McDonald 65'; Campbell 70'	BBC report	Fisher 21' 54'; Brad McKay (yellow card) 89'	Stadium: Fir Park; Attendance: 3,696; Referee: (Scotland) Collum

28 April 2017 Premiership	Ross County	4–0	Inverness Caledonian Thistle	Dingwall
19:45	O'Brien (yellow card) 10'; Boyce 21' 34' 49' (pen.) 60' (pen.); Chow (yellow card) 53'	BBC report	Vigurs (yellow card) 49'; Polworth (red card) 60'	Stadium: Global Energy Stadium; Attendance: 4,928; Referee: Thomson

6 May 2017 Premiership	Inverness Caledonian Thistle	2–1	Hamilton Academical	Inverness
12:15	Brad McKay 10'; Tansey 36' (pen.) (yellow card) 54'; Draper (yellow card) 40'; Billy Mckay (yellow card) 51'; Boden (yellow card) 74'	BBC report	Donati (yellow card) 35'; Redmond 90+4'	Stadium: Tulloch Caledonian Stadium; Attendance: 2,478; Referee: Dallas

13 May 2017 Premiership	Kilmarnock	2–1	Inverness Caledonian Thistle	Kilmarnock
15:00	Wilson (yellow card) 15'; Smith (yellow card) 16'; Longstaff 17'; Jones 57'	BBC report	Brad McKay (yellow card) 15'; Fisher 71'	Stadium: Rugby Park; Attendance: 3,137; Referee: Beaton

17 May 2017 Premiership	Dundee	0–2	Inverness Caledonian Thistle	Dundee
19:45		BBC report	Billy Mckay 2'; Fisher 10'; Vigurs (yellow card) 65'; Henri Anier (yellow card) 81'	Stadium: Dens Park; Attendance: 5,574; Referee: Clancy

20 May 2017 Premiership	Inverness Caledonian Thistle	3–2	Motherwell	Inverness
15:00	Tansey 64'; Fisher 66', 67'	BBC report	McFadden 73'; Bowman 90+3'	Stadium: Tulloch Caledonian Stadium; Attendance: 5351; Referee: Thomson

=== League Cup ===
16 July 2016 Group C	Cowdenbeath	1–2	Inverness Caledonian Thistle	Central Park
15:00	Brett 23' (yellow card) 53'; Rutherford (yellow card) 63'; Chris Turner (yellow card) 69'	SPFL Report	Draper 13'; Warren (yellow card) 68' (goal) 74'	Attendance: 487; Referee: Finnie

23 July 2016 Group C	Inverness Caledonian Thistle	1–1 (1–4 p)	Dundee United	Caledonian Stadium
15:00	Boden 35'; Draper (yellow card) 37'	BBC Report	Murdoch 46' van der Velden (yellow card) 49'; Durnan (yellow card) 79'; Obadeyi (yellow card) 81'	Attendance: 1,839; Referee: Anderson

26 July 2016 Group C	Dunfermline Athletic	1–5	Inverness Caledonian Thistle	East End Park
19:45	Geggan (yellow card) 24' (goal) 28'; Cardle (yellow card) 61'	SPFL Report	Vigurs 16' 42' 66'; King 54'; Tremarco 89'	Attendance: 2,580; Referee: Allan

30 July 2016 Group C	Inverness Caledonian Thistle	7–0	Arbroath	Caledonian Stadium
15:00	King 10'; Boden 18' 25' 71'; Tremarco 37' 87'; Vigurs 47'	BBC Report		Attendance: 1,316; Referee: Aitken

9 August 2016 Second Round	Alloa Athletic	1–0	Inverness Caledonian Thistle	The Indodrill Stadium
19:30	Marr 28'; Flannigan (yellow card) 35'; Jamie Longworth (yellow card) 44'; Waters (yellow card) 90+1'	Sky Report		Attendance: 613; Referee: Robertson

=== Scottish Cup ===
21 January 2017 Scottish Cup Fourth round	Elgin City	1–2	Inverness Caledonian Thistle	Borough Briggs
15:00	Mark Nicolson 25'; Archie MacPhee (yellow card) 53'; Darryl McHardy (yellow card) 78'	BBC Report	Cole 32'; Doumbouya 66'; Doran (yellow card) 76'	Attendance: 3,624; Referee: McKendrick

11 February 2017 Scottish Cup Fifth round	Celtic	6–0	Inverness Caledonian Thistle	Celtic Park
12:15	Lustig 20' (yellow card) 73'; Dembélé 45' 50' 59'; Tierney 86'; Brown 90+1'	BBCReport	Tremarco (yellow card) 29'; Draper (yellow card) 35'; Vigurs (yellow card) 37'; Warren (yellow card) 42'	Attendance: 25,577; Referee: Clancy

== Squad statistics ==
During the 2016–17 season, Inverness Caledonian Thistle have used twenty-nine different players in competitive games. The table below shows the number of appearances and goals scored by each player.

=== Appearances ===
As of 20 May 2017

No.	Pos	Nat	Player	Total		Premiership		League Cup		Scottish Cup	
No.	Pos	Nat	Player	Apps	Goals	Apps	Goals	Apps	Goals	Apps	Goals
1	GK	(Scotland) SCO	Ryan Esson	7	0	6+0	0	1+0	0	0+0	0
2	DF	(England) ENG	David Raven	26	1	19+2	1	4+0	0	1+0	0
3	DF	(England) ENG	Carl Tremarco	36	7	29+0	4	5+0	3	2+0	0
4	DF	(Scotland) SCO	Kevin McNaughton	14	0	5+4	0	5+0	0	0+0	0
5	DF	(England) ENG	Gary Warren	40	3	33+0	2	5+0	1	2+0	0
6	DF	(England) ENG	Josh Meekings	18	1	18+0	1	0+0	0	0+0	0
7	MF	(Scotland) SCO	Liam Polworth	38	3	26+6	3	5+0	0	1+0	0
8	MF	(England) ENG	Ross Draper	43	4	35+2	3	2+3	1	1+0	0
9	FW	(Republic of Ireland) IRL	Dean Ebbe	4	0	0+3	0	0+0	0	0+1	0
10	MF	(Republic of Ireland) IRL	Aaron Doran	19	1	6+11	1	0+1	0	1+0	0
11	MF	(Scotland) SCO	Iain Vigurs	39	5	28+4	1	5+0	4	2+0	0
12	DF	(Scotland) SCO	Jamie McCart	11	0	9+2	0	0+0	0	0+0	0
13	FW	(England) ENG	Billy Mckay	14	4	13+0	4	0+0	0	1+0	0
14	MF	(Scotland) SCO	Jason Brown	1	0	0+0	0	0+1	0	0+0	0
15	MF	(Republic of Ireland) IRL	Jake Mulraney	32	0	10+16	0	3+2	0	0+1	0
16	MF	(England) ENG	Greg Tansey	44	7	37+0	7	5+0	0	2+0	0
17	DF	(England) ENG	Lewis Horner	11	0	5+5	0	1+0	0	0+0	0
18	FW	(England) ENG	Alex Fisher	25	8	8+13	8	0+4	0	0+0	0
19	FW	(England) ENG	Scott Boden	19	5	3+10	1	5+0	4	1+0	0
20	MF	(Scotland) SCO	Billy King	32	3	17+9	1	5+0	2	1+0	0
21	FW	(Scotland) SCO	Alisdair Sutherland	2	0	0+1	0	0+1	0	0+0	0
21	DF	(England) ENG	Louis Laing	14	0	14+0	0	0+0	0	0+0	0
22	DF	(Scotland) SCO	Brad McKay	29	1	25+2	1	0+0	0	2+0	0
23	FW	(Estonia) EST	Henri Anier	15	0	8+5	0	0+0	0	1+1	0
25	GK	(Wales) WAL	Owain Fôn Williams	35	0	31+0	0	2+0	0	2+0	0
26	FW	(Guinea) GUI	Lonsana Doumbouya	20	6	17+2	5	0+0	0	1+0	1
29	MF	(England) ENG	Larnell Cole	23	2	13+8	1	0+0	0	1+1	1
31	GK	(Scotland) SCO	Cameron Mackay	4	0	1+0	0	2+1	0	0+0	0
33	DF	(England) ENG	Cameron Gilchrist	1	0	0+1	0	0+0	0	0+0	0

=== Overall goalscorers ===
Rank	Player	Goals
1st	(England) Alex Fisher	9
2nd	(England) Greg Tansey; (England) Carl Tremarco	7
4th	(Guinea) Lonsana Doumbouya	6
5th	(England) Scott Boden; (Scotland) Iain Vigurs	5
7th	(England) Ross Draper	4
8th	(Scotland) Billy King; (Northern Ireland) Billy Mckay; (Scotland) Liam Polworth; (England) Gary Warren	3
12th	(England) Larnell Cole	2
13th	(Republic of Ireland) Aaron Doran; (Scotland) Brad McKay; (England) Josh Meekings; (England) David Raven	1

=== Hat-tricks ===
Player	Competition	Score	Opponent	Date
(Scotland) Iain Vigurs	Scottish League Cup	1–5	Dunfermline Athletic	26 July 2016
(England) Scott Boden	Scottish League Cup	7–0	Arbroath	30 July 2016

== Team statistics ==
=== League table ===
Pos	Team	Pld	W	D	L	GF	GA	GD	Pts	Qualification or relegation (Note: Teams played each other three times (33 matches), before the league split into two groups (the top six and the bottom six) for the last five matches.)
8	Kilmarnock	38	9	14	15	36	56	−20	41	
9	Motherwell	38	10	8	20	46	69	−23	38	
10	Dundee	38	10	7	21	38	62	−24	37	
11	Hamilton Academical (O)	38	7	14	17	37	56	−19	35	Qualification for the Premiership play-off final
12	Inverness Caledonian Thistle (R)	38	7	13	18	44	71	−27	34	Relegation to the Scottish Championship

Source: Scottish Premiership, Soccerway
Rules for classification: 1) Points; 2) Goal difference; 3) Goals scored; 4) Play-off (only if deciding champion, UEFA competitions qualification and second stage group allocation).
(O) Play-off winners; (R) Relegated

=== Results by matchday ===
Matchday	1	2	3	4	5	6	7	8	9	10	11	12	13	14	15	16	17	18	19	20	21	22	23	24	25	26	27	28	29	30	31	32	33	34	35	36	37	38
Ground	A	H	A	H	A	H	H	A	H	H	A	H	A	H	A	A	H	A	A	H	A	H	A	H	A	H	H	A	H	H	A	H	A	A	H	A	A	H
Result	L	L	L	W	D	D	W	D	L	D	W	D	L	L	L	L	D	D	L	L	L	D	L	D	D	W	L	D	D	D	L	L	L	L	W	L	W	W
Position	12	12	12	12	11	11	8	8	7	6	6	6	6	7	9	12	11	11	12	12	12	12	12	12	12	11	12	12	11	12	12	12	12	12	12	12	12	12

Updated to match(es) played on 20 May 2017. Source:
A = Away; H = Home; W = Win; D = Draw; L = Loss

=== Management statistics ===
Last updated on 20 May 2017

Name	From	To	P	W	D	L	Win% (Note: Win% is the percentage of matches won rounded to two decimal places.)
Richie Foran	14 July 2016	31 May 2017	45	11	13	21	24.44

== Transfers ==
Players In
Player	Age*	Pos	From	Fee	Date
(Republic of Ireland) Jake Mulraney	20	MF	(England) Queens Park Rangers	Free	1 July 2016
(Scotland) Jason Brown	19	DF	Academy	N/A	1 July 2016
(Scotland) Ali Sutherland	19	MF	Academy	N/A	1 July 2016
(Scotland) Cameron Mackay	19	GK	Academy	N/A	1 July 2016
(England) Scott Boden	26	ST	(England) Newport County	Free	1 July 2016
(Scotland) Kevin McNaughton	33	DF	(England) Wigan Athletic	Free	12 July 2016
(Guinea) Lonsana Doumbouya	25	ST	(Belgium) Cercle Brugge	Free	25 August 2016
(Scotland) Brad McKay	23	DF	(Scotland) St Johnstone	Free	31 August 2016
(Republic of Ireland) Dean Ebbe	22	ST	(Republic of Ireland) Bluebell United	Undisclosed	4 January 2017
(Estonia) Henri Anier	26	ST	(Sweden) Kalmar FF	Free	16 January 2017
(England) Louis Laing	23	MF	Free Agent	N/A	16 February 2017

Players Out
Player	Age*	Pos	To	Fee	Date	Notes
(England) Danny Williams	28	MF	(Scotland) Dundee	Free	1 July 2016	
(England) Nat Wedderburn	26	MF	(Scotland) Dunfermline Athletic	Free	1 July 2016	
(England) Jordan Roberts	22	MF	(England) Crawley Town	Free	1 July 2016	
(England) James Vincent	26	MF	(Scotland) Dundee	Free	1 July 2016	
(England) Dean Brill	30	GK	(Scotland) Motherwell	Free	1 July 2016	
(Northern Ireland) Danny Devine	23	DF	(Scotland) Partick Thistle	Free	1 July 2016	
(England) Liam Hughes	23	MF	(England) Barrow	Free	1 July 2016	
(Republic of Ireland) Richie Foran	36	MF	Retired	N/A	1 July 2016	Took Managerial Role
(Canada) Calum Ferguson	21	ST	(Scotland) Albion Rovers	Free	2 July 2016	
(England) Ryan Williams	25	MF	(Canada) Ottawa Fury	Free	19 July 2016	
(Guinea) Lonsana Doumbouya	26	ST	(Austria) SKN St. Pölten	Free	26 January 2018	
(Scotland) Alisdair Sutherland	20	MF	(Scotland) Elgin City	Free	1 February 2017	
(Democratic Republic of the Congo) Andréa Mbuyi-Mutombo	26	MF	(Croatia) RNK Split	Free	17 February 2017	

Loans In/Returns
Player	Age*	Pos	From	Duration	Date In	Date Out
(Scotland) Billy King	22	MF	(Scotland) Heart of Midlothian	Season	12 July 2016	29 May 2017
(England) Larnell Cole	23	MF	(England) Fulham	Season	31 August 2016	31 May 2017
(Scotland) Cameron Mackay	19	GK	(Scotland) Elgin City	Return	9 September 2016	N/A
(Scotland) Jason Brown	20	DF	(Scotland) Arbroath	Return	19 October 2016	N/A
(Scotland) Jamie McCart	19	DF	(Scotland) Celtic	Half Season	31 January 2017	31 May 2017
(Northern Ireland) Billy Mckay	28	ST	(England) Wigan Athletic	Half Season	31 January 2017	31 May 2017
(Scotland) Jason Brown	20	DF	(Scotland) Cove Rangers	Return	1 May 2017	N/A
(Scotland) Cameron Mackay	20	GK	(Scotland) Elgin City	Return	15 May 2017	N/A

Loans Out/Returns
Player	Age*	Pos	To	Duration	Date Out	Date In
(Scotland) Cameron Mackay	19	GK	(Scotland) Elgin City	Emergency Loan	13 August 2016	9 September 2016
(Scotland) Jason Brown	20	DF	(Scotland) Arbroath	Short Term	26 August 2016	19 October 2016
(Scotland) Cameron Mackay	20	GK	(Scotland) Elgin City	Half Season	10 December 2016	15 May 2017
(Scotland) Jason Brown	20	DF	(Scotland) Cove Rangers	Half Season	27 January 2017	1 May 2017
(Scotland) Billy King	23	MF	(Scotland) Heart of Midlothian	Season	29 May 2017	N/A
(Northern Ireland) Billy Mckay	28	ST	(England) Wigan Athletic	Half Season	31 May 2017	N/A
(England) Larnell Cole	24	MF	(England) Fulham	Season	31 May 2017	N/A
(Scotland) Jamie McCart	19	DF	(Scotland) Celtic	Season	31 May 2017	N/A

* - Age at time of signing

== See also ==
- List of Inverness Caledonian Thistle F.C. seasons
