= 1998–99 Highland League Cup =

1998–99 Tennents Aggregates Highland League Cup
Tournament details
- Country: Scotland
- Teams: 16

Final positions
- Champions: Forres Mechanics
- Runner-up: Keith

The 1998–99 Tennents Highland League Cup was the 54th edition of the Highland League's premier knock-out football competition. The winners were Forres Mechanics, who defeated Keith 1-0 in the final at Borough Briggs in Elgin.

== Group stage ==
The first stage of the Cup was a group stage consisting of four groups, called districts, of four teams. The four group winners qualified for the semi-finals.

=== District 1 ===
Pos	Team	Pld	W	D	L	GF	GA	GD	Pts
1	Keith	3	2	1	0	4	1	+3	7
2	Peterhead	3	2	0	1	5	4	+1	6
3	Fraserburgh	3	1	0	2	8	5	+3	3
4	Rothes	3	0	1	2	2	9	−7	1

=== District 2 ===
Pos	Team	Pld	W	D	L	GF	GA	GD	Pts
1	Huntly	3	2	1	0	5	0	+5	7
2	Cove Rangers	3	2	0	1	4	5	−1	6
3	Buckie Thistle	3	1	0	2	3	5	−2	3
4	Deveronvale	3	0	1	2	2	4	−2	1

=== District 3 ===
Pos	Team	Pld	W	D	L	GF	GA	GD	Pts
1	Forres Mechanics	3	2	1	0	8	3	+5	7
2	Lossiemouth	3	2	1	0	5	1	+4	7
3	Nairn County	3	1	0	2	4	9	−5	3
4	Elgin City	3	0	0	3	1	5	−4	0

=== District 4 ===
Pos	Team	Pld	W	D	L	GF	GA	GD	Pts
1	Brora Rangers	3	3	0	0	5	1	+4	9
2	Clachnacuddin	3	2	0	1	8	1	+7	6
3	Fort William	3	0	1	2	3	6	−3	1
4	Wick Academy	3	0	1	2	2	10	−8	1

== Semi-finals ==
Ties in the semi-finals took place on Saturday 1 May

Home team	Score	Away team
Brora Rangers	0-1	Keith
Forres Mechanics	2-1	Huntly

== Final ==
8 May 1999

Forres Mechanics	1-0	Keith
Bavidge

Borough Briggs, Elgin
