= 2011–12 Highland League Cup =

2011–12 Breedon Aggregates Highland League Cup
Tournament details
- Country: Scotland
- Teams: 18

Final positions
- Champions: Buckie Thistle
- Runner-up: Cove Rangers

The 2011–12 Breedon Aggregates Highland League Cup was the 67th edition of the Highlands' premier knock-out football competition. The winners were Buckie Thistle, who defeated Cove Rangers 2–0 in the final at Princess Royal Park in Banff.

== First round ==
In the first round draw, 14 clubs were given a bye into the Second Round, and four clubs were drawn to play each other in the First Round. Ties in the First Round took place on Saturday 3 March.

Home team	Score	Away team
Inverurie Loco Works	2-0	Fraserburgh
Strathspey Thistle	0-1	Nairn County

== Second round ==
Ties in the Second Round took place on Saturday 17 March.

Home team	Score	Away team
Buckie Thistle	2-1	Nairn County
Cove Rangers	4-2	Clachnacuddin
Deveronvale	5-4^{1}	Wick Academy
Fort William	3-4	Formartine United
Huntly	1-3	Turriff United
Keith	2-1	Brora Rangers
Lossiemouth	3-1	Inverurie Loco Works
Rothes	0-4	Forres Mechanics

^{1} After Extra Time

== Third round ==
Ties in the Third Round took place on Saturday 7 April.

Home team	Score	Away team
Buckie Thistle	2-1^{1}	Deveronvale
Cove Rangers	4-0	Lossiemouth
Forres Mechanics	1-1^{2}	Keith
Turriff United	1-0	Formartine United

^{1} After Extra Time
^{2} After Extra Time - Keith won 4–3 on penalties

== Semi-finals ==
Ties in the semi-finals took place on Saturday 21 April

Home team	Score	Away team
Buckie Thistle	3-1	Keith
Cove Rangers	3-0	Turriff United

== Final ==
12 May 2013
15:00

Buckie Thistle	2-0	Cove Rangers
Scott 3'; Keith 75' (pen.)	Press and Journal

Princess Royal Park, Banff
