= Josh Meekings =

English footballer (born 1992)

Personal information
- Date of birth: 2 September 1992 (age 34)
- Place of birth: Bury St Edmunds, England
- Height: 6 ft 1 in (1.85 m)
- Position: Defender

Youth career
- 2007–2011: Ipswich Town

Senior career*
Years	Team	Apps	(Gls)
2011–2017	Inverness Caledonian Thistle	163	(6)
2017–2020	Dundee	41	(0)
2021	Wealdstone	3	(0)
2021–2024	Brora Rangers	36	(3)
2024–2026	Clachnacuddin	24	(4)
Total		267	(13)
- * Club domestic league appearances and goals as of 15:09, 31 May 2026 (UTC)

Josh Meekings (born 2 September 1992) is an English former professional footballer and coach who last played as a central defender for Highland League club Clachnacuddin. Meekings has previously played for Ipswich Town, Inverness Caledonian Thistle, Dundee, Wealdstone and Brora Rangers, the latter of whom Meekings was also player-assistant manager for.

== Club career ==
=== Ipswich Town ===
Born in Bury St Edmunds, England, Meekings was raised in Suffolk. He started his football career at Ipswich Town, joining the club at seven years old. Meekings then progressed through Ipswich Town's youth system, including captaining the under-18s side.

However, in the summer of 2011, he was released by the club without having played for the first-team.

=== Inverness Caledonian Thistle ===
Meekings was due to sign a deal with Stevenage but the deal fell through and instead, on 4 July 2011 he agreed to join Inverness Caledonian Thistle on a two-year deal. Shortly after moving to Inverness, Meekings revealed that the prospect of developing under manager Terry Butcher was influential in his decision to sign.

==== 2011–12 season ====
However, Meekings suffered an ankle ligament damage during the friendly match against Yeovil Town on 12 July 2011. After the match, he was out for the start of the 2011–12 season. Meekings appeared in the Inverness Caledonian Thistle's first team for the first time as an unused substitute, in a 2–0 loss against Celtic on 24 September 2011. On 22 October 2011, he finally his professional debut (as well as the club), coming on as 66th-minute substitute for Thomas Piermayr, during a 1–1 draw against Dunfermline Athletic on 22 October 2011. Two weeks later on 5 November 2011, Meekings provided the 'assist' for Grégory Tadé to score – to make 3–1 – against Kilmarnock, the match ending with Inverness Caledonian Thistle winning 6–3. However, he suffered an injury and did not play for two months.

After not playing for two months, Meekings returned to the starting line–up in the centre–back position, in a 1–0 win against Heart of Midlothian on 21 January 2012. He received a handful of first team football for the next six matches for Inverness Caledonian Thistle. On 24 March 2012, Meekings received a red card for the first time in his career after a second bookable offence, in a 1–0 win over Aberdeen. After serving a one match suspension, he returned to the starting line–up, in a 3–2 loss against Hibernian on 2 April 2012. At the end of the 2011–12 season, Meekings made twenty–one appearances in all competitions.

==== 2012–13 season ====
At the start of the 2012–13 season, Meekings became a regular starter for Inverness Caledonian Thistle following an injury of new signing, Simon King. Having started out playing in the right–back position, he ultimately settled into a regular first team, central pairing with Gary Warren. On 31 October 2012, Meekings started the match and helped the club beat Rangers 3–0 away in the quarter-final of the Scottish League Cup. On 24 November 2012, he also started the match and helped Inverness Caledonian Thistle kept a clean sheet, in a 1–0 win away against Celtic. However, on 15 December 2012, Meekings scored an own goal in a 4–4 draw against Dundee United.

His performances at the club led to Meekings began talks over a new contract. On 24 December 2012, he along with Graeme Shinnie, signed two-year contract extensions, keeping them at Inverness Caledonian Thistle until 2015, as manager Terry Butcher demonstrated his desire to keep the squad intact. After missing two matches, Meekings made his return from injury, starting the whole game, in a 3–0 win against Aberdeen on 19 January 2013. However, his return was short–lived when he suffered a back injury that saw him out for one match. But Meekings made his return to the starting line–up against Dundee United on 27 February 2013 and helped the club, in a 0–0 draw.

Meekings' excellent season and consistent form was recognised with the award of SPL Young Player of the Month for March 2013. On 4 May 2013, he provided a double assist for Billy Mckay, who later scored a hat-trick, in a 4–3 win over Motherwell, to keep alive hopes of earning a spot in the UEFA Europa League next season. However, on the last game of the season, Meekings was unable to help Inverness Caledonian Thistle qualify for the UEFA Europa League after losing 1–0 against local rivals, Ross County on the last game of the season. At the end of the 2012–13 season, he made forty–one appearances in all competitions.

==== 2013–14 season ====
Meekings helped Inverness Caledonian Thistle kept a clean sheet in the first three league matches of the season. Since the start of the 2013–14 season, he continued as a regular starter for the club, playing in central defence and occasionally playing as a right-back position. On 14 September 2013, Meekings set up a winning goal for Billy McKay, in a 2–1 win against Kilmarnock. On 29 October 2013, he helped Inverness Caledonian Thistle beat Dundee United 2–1 in the quarter-final of the Scottish League Cup, which proved to be the winner to send the club through to the semi-finals.

Meekings, once again, helped Inverness Caledonian Thistle kept five clean sheets in all competitions between 9 November 2013 and 14 December 2013. However, in a match against Kilmarnock on 25 January 2014, he suffered an injury and substituted in the 68th minute, as the club loss 2–0. But he made his return to the starting line–up against Heart of Midlothian in the semi-final of the Scottish League Cup, only for him to be sent–off in the last minute of the game, as Inverness Caledonian Thistle went on to win 4–2 in the penalty shootout to reach the Scottish League Cup final. After the match, Meekings was cleared to play in the final after a successful appeal. He first learned about his successful appeal, saying: "I was training at the time, and the manager came up to me and told me. At first it didn't really sink in - I was just concentrating on training. Then when we finished I went and asked him again to make sure that I heard right. You're always nervous, but I was fairly confident I would get something because I felt at the time it was a bit harsh. It was one of those things: the referee has made a mistake, and he's put his hands up and accepted that. I can only be thankful now that I'm able to play."

Meekings, once again, helped the club kept four clean sheets in all competitions between 15 February 2014 and 25 February 2014. He started the whole game in the Scottish League Cup Final against Aberdeen, as Inverness Caledonian Thistle lost 4–2 on penalties after a 0–0 draw. However, on 29 March 2014, Meekings was sent-off in the 68th minute for a foul on Josh Magennis, in a 2–2 draw against St Mirren. After serving a one match suspension, he returned to the starting line–up, in a 2–1 win against local rivals, Ross County on 4 April 2014. However, his return was short–lived when Meekings suffered a knee injury that saw him sidelined for the rest of the 2013–14 season. At the end of the 2013–14 season, he went on to make forty–two appearances in all competitions.

==== 2014–15 season ====
At the start of the 2014–15 season, Meekings started the season well when he helped Inverness Caledonian Thistle kept five clean sheets in the first five league matches of the season and earned the club 13 points in the first six matches. Meekings’ performance attracted interest from Peterborough United, but he ended up staying at Inverness Caledonian Thistle. Meekings continued to regain his first team place, forming a centre–back partnership with Warren and Ross Draper.

On 27 September 2014, he scored the first goal of his professional football career, which was the opening goal of the game, in an eventual 3–2 loss against Aberdeen. After the match, Meekings said he want to score more goals to his games. On 8 November 2014, Meekings made his 100th league appearance for the club in a 4–2 win over Hamilton Accies. He scored against Motherwell and St Mirren on 22 November 2014 and 29 November 2014. His performance at Inverness Caledonian Thistle reignited interest from Peterborough United, but Meekings stayed at the club for the second time this season. This prompted Inverness Caledonian Thistle to open talks with the player over a new contract. On 12 February 2015, he signed a contract extension with the club, keeping him until the summer of 2017.

Meekings became the subject of much national and international interest in the aftermath of Inverness Caledonian Thistle's Scottish Cup semi-final win against Celtic to reach the final. During the game, television pictures and replays clearly showed that he 'handled' the ball in the penalty area, preventing a certain goal – however, the incident was 'missed' by the match officials. In an unprecedented move, Meekings was retrospectively cited by the SFA's Compliance Officer to face a charge of 'preventing a goal-scoring opportunity by deliberately handling the ball'. He was offered a one-match-ban, but Inverness CaledonianThistle contested this and a date was set for the case to be heard. On the day of the hearing, it transpired that Meekings should not actually have been cited, as the referee had subsequently confirmed that he had indeed seen the 'incident' but not the alleged 'offence'. As a result, the case did not proceed and the charge against Meekings was dropped, with the SFA confirming that he would be eligible to play in the cup final. Following this, Celtic manager Ronny Deila believed Meekings deserved to play in the final. Meekings, himself, spoke about the aftermath of the hearing, saying he was lucky to avoid suspension and credited Manager John Hughes for helping him sane by avoiding global headlines.

In the build up to the Scottish Cup final, Meekings played in the right–back position for the first time, in a 2–1 win against Dundee United on 5 May 2015. Two weeks later on 16 May 2015, he scored his fourth goal of the season and set up the second goal of the game, in a 3–0 win over Dundee United. Having played in every league matches throughout the 2014–15 season, Meekings sat out for the match against Celtic on the last game of the season by manager John Hughes. In the Scottish Cup Final, he started the match with Danny Devine and helped the club beat Falkirk a 2–1 to win their first ever Scottish Cup Final. After the match, Meekings said: "That is what football is all about. You get the ups and downs but you just have to take those lows on the chin. It was obviously a difficult few days when I didn't know if I was playing or not but it makes this even more special to have come through it all and end up with a winner's medal. I'm just delighted. What we have done this season has been huge. If you had told me at the beginning of the season that we would end in Europe and win a cup, I'd have bitten your arm off for it. It's incredible - I still cannot describe how I'm feeling. It's unbelievable what we have done." At the end of the 2014–15 season, he made forty–four appearances and scoring four times in all competitions.

==== 2015–16 season ====
At the start of the 2015–16 season, Meekings made his European football debut, playing in both legs against FC Astra Giurgiu in the UEFA Europa League second qualifying round, losing 1–0 on aggregate and Inverness Caledonian Thistle was eliminated in the tournament. However, he suffered a hip injury in the opening game of the season against Motherwell and was substituted at half time, as the club loss 1–0. After the match, Meekings was out for a month with hip, groin and thigh injuries. On 11 September 2015, he returned to the starting line–up, forming a centre–back partnership with Devine, in a 2–0 win against Heart of Midlothian. In a follow–up match, Meekings scored his first goal of the season, scoring an equalising goal, in a 1–1 draw against Dundee United.

Following his return from injury, he regained his first team place, playing in either centre–back position or right–back positions. However, Meekings suffered a knee injury and was out for three months. On 16 March 2016, he made his return from injury, starting the whole game, against Hibernian in the Scottish Cup quarter-finals replay, as the club loss 2–1 and was eliminated from the tournament. Following his return from injury, Meekings regained his first team place for the rest of the season, playing in the right–back position. On 30 April 2016, he scored his second goal of the season, in a 4–1 win against Partick Thistle. At the end of the 2015–16 season, Meekings made twenty–two appearances and scoring two times in all competitions. However, he reflected on the season, saying: "I wasn’t particularly happy with how the season went. It was a difficult one because of the injuries, so I’m hoping this six-week break will have done me good. I didn’t achieve everything I wanted to last season which was frustrating. I’m not sure if right back will be my long-term position. I am still young and I was enjoying playing at right back, I liked the fact it gave me the chance to get forward. I feel I have a lot of energy and like to use my pace going down the line, so I will have to wait and see what the manager has planned for next season."

==== 2016–17 season ====
Ahead of the 2016–17 season, Meekings said that he is/has looking forward to bounce back from injury and fight for his first team place at Inverness Caledonian Thistle under the new management and former teammate, Richie Foran. However, he suffered a knee injury that saw him out at the start of the season. On 20 August 2016, Meekings made his return from injury, starting the whole game, in a 5–1 loss against Heart of Midlothian. In a follow–up match against St Johnstone, he scored his first goal of the season, in a 2–1 win. Following his return from injury, Meekings regained his first team place, playing in the centre–back position with Warren.

However, in mid–October, he suffered an injury that saw him out for one match. But on 22 October 2016, Meekings made his return to the starting line–up, in a 1–1 draw against Kilmarnock. Following his return from injury, he, once again, regained his first team place, playing in the centre–back position with Warren. In a match against Kilmarnock on 17 December 2016, Meekings played a role in the match when he made a goal-line clearance from Nathan Tyson, as the match ended in a 1–1 draw. After the match, his performance was praised by manager Foran. However, during a match against Ross County on 31 December 2016, Meekings suffered a head injury but played the whole game, in a 3–2 loss. However, he suffered a knee injury that saw him out for the rest of the season. At the end of the 2016–17 season, Meekings made eighteen appearances and scoring once in all competitions.

With his contract at the club expiring at the end of the 2016–17 season, Meekings said he prefer to focus on football instead of his future. As a result, Meekings’ contract talk with Inverness Caledonian Thistle was put on hold until January. In June, he was told by Inverness Caledonian Thistle that they cannot afford to keep him, ending his seven years association with the club.

=== Dundee ===
Having rehabilitated from injury with Dundee, Meekings signed a one-year contract with the club on 18 August 2017. However, he missed the first two months since signing for Dundee, due to not being match fit.

On 14 October 2017, Meekings made his debut for the club, starting the whole game, in a 1–0 loss against Celtic. After the match, manager Neil McCann praised his debut performance, describing him as “outstanding”. Following his return from injury, he was featured featuring throughout the first half of the season. However, Meekings suffered various injuries throughout the latter half when he was substituted twice with two separate injuries. Despite this, Meekings signed a two-year contract extension in March 2018. At the end of the 2017–18 season, he made twenty–three appearances in all competitions.

In the 2018–19 season, Meekings made his recovery from his knee injury and made his return, starting the whole game, in a 4–0 win against Stirling Albion in the group stage of the Scottish League Cup. He captained Dundee for the first time against Peterhead in the group stage of the Scottish League Cup and helped the club win 2–0 on 28 July 2018. Due to his performance, Meekings was named as a new captain for Dundee. He went on to captain the side on five occasions. Unfortunately, injuries would continue to plague him, with a hip injury Meekings received in September effectively ending his season when it was declared it needed to be operated on in November. At the end of the 2018–19 season, he made nine appearances in all competitions.

Now in the Championship with Dundee, the now injury-free Meekings recovered from his injury and is looking forward to form a centre–back partnership with Andrew Davies. He made his first appearance of the season, starting the whole game as captain, in a 3–0 win against Raith Rovers in the group stage of the Scottish League Cup. However, Meekings struggled to find playing time for the first half of the season. The team captain eventually gained a starting spot in December, and would eventually form an effective partnership with Christophe Berra and Jordon Forster that would keep 5 consecutive clean sheets. This positive momentum was however abruptly cut short due to the coronavirus pandemic, which would curtail the remainder of the season. At the end of the 2019–20 season, he made twenty–one appearances in all competitions.

In May, Dundee announced they would extend the contracts of players whose contracts were to expire, including Meekings, the following month to July. However, he left Dundee on 29 June 2020 after rejecting a contract extension.

=== Wealdstone ===
On 15 January 2021, Meekings signed for National League side Wealdstone. He cited joining the club to move his family closer to Suffolk.

Meekings made his Wealdstone's debut on 18 January, playing the full 90 minutes in a 3–1 victory over Gloucester City in the FA Trophy. However, his time at the club was heavily disrupted by injury, and made only four appearances. On 4 June 2021, he departed Wealdstone at the end of the season.

=== Brora Rangers ===
On 13 June 2021, Meekings made his return to the Highlands after signing a three-year deal with Highland League side Brora Rangers. Upon joining the club, he said it was the right time for him to play part-time football, due to his job as a sport massage therapist.

However, he missed the start of the 2021–22 season, due to suffering from a knee injury. On 7 August 2021, Meekings made his debut for the club against Fraserburgh, coming on as a 62nd-minute substitute and scored an own-goal ten minutes later, in a 6–2 loss. After missing one match due to injury, he scored on his return and set up one of the goals, in a 8–0 win against Fort William on 21 August 2021. On 22 September 2021, Meekings was added to the Cattachs' management team as a coach under new manager Craig Campbell, pending completing his qualification. Three days later on 25 September 2021, however, he received a red card for a second bookable offence, in a 2–1 loss against Inverurie Loco Works. In February 2022, Meekings suffered an injury that saw him out for two matches. On 19 February 2022, he made his return from injury, starting the whole game, in a 2–2 draw against Wick Academy. His return was short–lived when Meekings suffered an injury that saw him out for a month. On 19 March 2022, he scored on his return from injury, in a 7–0 win against Lossiemouth. Meekings would win the Highland League Cup with Brora Rangers by beating Buckie Thistle 2–1 on 9 April 2022. At the end of the 2021–22 season, he made twenty–two appearances and scoring two times in all competitions.

At the start of the 2022–23 season, Meekings scored his first goal of the season, in a 4–0 win against Clachnacuddin on 8 August 2022. He regained his first team place, playing in the centre–back position in the first two months to the season. On 1 October 2022, Meekings would get his second trophy as a player/coach with Brora Rangers later that year as the Cattachs won the North of Scotland Cup, beating Clachnacuddin 2–1. Following the departure of Craig Campbell, there was suggestions from former Brora Rangers’ player Stuart Golabek that he should be the club's next manager. On 23 February 2023, he was named as player-assistant manager for Brora Rangers under new manager Ally MacDonald. Throughout the 2022–23 season, Meekings was out for most of the 2022–23 season, due to injuries and his focus as the club's assistant manager. At the end of the 2022–23 season, he made sixteen appearances and scoring once in all competitions.

In the 2023–24 season, Meekings spent most of the season out of the first team, focusing on his duties as Brora Rangers’ assistant manager. He also faced his own injury concerns along the way. In August 2023, Meekings signed a contract extension with the club. On 4 October 2023, he took in charge for the club's match, in a 2–0 win against Clachnacuddin. On 18 November 2023, Meekings made his return from injury, coming on as a 75th-minute substitute, in a 3–0 win against Huntly. He won his first trophy as a coach on 30 March 2024, as well as being an unused substitute for Brora Rangers as they defeated Fraserburgh on penalties to win the Highland League Cup. On 20 April 2024, Meekings received a red card, in a 2–1 loss against Brechin City. At the end of the 2023–24 season, he made ten appearances in all competitions.

On 11 June 2024, Brora announced that Meekings would leave Brora Rangers upon the expiry of his contract, ending his three-year spell at the club.

=== Clachnacuddin ===
On 14 June 2024, Meekings joined Highland League club Clachnacuddin. Upon joining the club, he said: "I discussed it with Brora Rangers, and we felt it was best to mutually part ways. After that, I had a few offers from clubs and the one that stood out for me was Conor Gethins and Clachnacuddin."

Meekings made his debut for Clachnacuddin, starting the whole game, in a 2–0 win against Lossiemouth in the opening game of the season. On 7 August 2024, he scored an own-goal, in a 2–0 loss against Nairn County. Meekings scored his first goal for the Lilywhites on 31 August in a league victory away to Deveronvale. Since joining the club, he became a first team regular, playing in the centre–back position and becoming their captain. Meeking scored against Inverness Athletic and Rothes on 2 October 2024 and 5 October 2024 respectively. In the North of Scotland final, he started the match and scored an own-goal, as Clachnacuddin loss 6–1 against his former club, Brora Rangers. However, Meekings suffered an injury that saw him out for the rest of the year. On 4 February 2025, he made his return from injury, coming on as a 59th-minute substitute, in a 4–2 loss against Brechin City. A month later on 15 March 2025, Meekings scored his fourth goal of the season, in a 2–1 loss against Turriff United. At the end of the 2024–25 season, he made twenty–eight appearances and scoring four times in all competitions.

At the start of the 2025–26 season, however, Meekings suffered an injury and was out for a month. On 30 August 2025, he scored a late equalising goal in the 88th minute, just four minutes after coming on as a substitute, in a 1–1 draw against Brechin City. However, his return was short–lived when Meekings suffered another injury that kept him out for a month. On 11 October 2025, he made his return from injury, coming on as a 82nd-minute substitute, in a 1–0 loss against Huntly. In the North of Scotland final, Meekings came on as a 72nd-minute substitute, in a 3–2 loss against Forres Mechanics.

On 19 May 2026, Meekings officially hung up his boots, due to a recurring injury problem.

== Personal life ==
In March 2016, Meekings was charged by the police for a breach of peace, committed in December 2015. In November 2016, he was found guilty of a breach of peace but was cleared of a homophobic abuse, having acknowledged the abuse. In May 2017, Meekings was given an absolute discharge.

Meekings is married to Grace Meekings and together, they have one daughter. He planned to be a sports massage therapy once his playing career is over and received a diploma during the Coronavirus Pandemic Lockdown in 2020.

== Career statistics ==
As of match played 30 August 2025

Appearances and goals by club, season and competition
Club	Season	League			Scottish Cup		League Cup		Other		Total	
Club	Season	Division	Apps	Goals	Apps	Goals	Apps	Goals	Apps	Goals	Apps	Goals
Inverness Caledonian Thistle	2011–12	Scottish Premier League	19	0	2	0	0	0	—		21	0
Inverness Caledonian Thistle	2012–13	Scottish Premier League	34	0	3	0	4	0	—		41	0
Inverness Caledonian Thistle	2013–14	Scottish Premiership	34	0	4	0	4	0	—		42	0
Inverness Caledonian Thistle	2014–15	Scottish Premiership	37	3	6	1	1	0	—		44	4
Inverness Caledonian Thistle	2015–16	Scottish Premiership	21	2	1	0	2	0	2 (Note: Appearances in the Europa League)	0	26	2
Inverness Caledonian Thistle	2016–17	Scottish Premiership	18	1	0	0	0	0	—		18	1
Inverness Caledonian Thistle	Total		163	6	16	1	11	0	2	0	192	7
Dundee	2017–18	Scottish Premiership	22	0	1	0	0	0	—		23	0
Dundee	2018–19	Scottish Premiership	4	0	0	0	5	0	—		9	0
Dundee	2019–20	Scottish Championship	15	0	1	0	4	0	1 (Note: Appearance in the Scottish Challenge Cup)	0	21	0
Dundee	Total		41	0	2	0	9	0	1	0	53	0
Wealdstone	2020–21	National League	3	0	0	0	0	0	1 (Note: Appearance in the FA Trophy)	0	4	0
Brora Rangers	2021–22	Highland League	16	2	2	0	0	0	4	0	22	2
Brora Rangers	2022–23	Highland League	10	1	1	0	0	0	5	0	16	1
Brora Rangers	2023–24	Highland League	10	0	0	0	0	0	0	0	10	0
Brora Rangers	Total		36	3	3	0	0	0	9	0	48	3
Clachnacuddin	2024–25	Highland League	23	3	2	0	0	0	3 (Note: Appearance(s) in the North of Scotland Cup)	1	28	4
Clachnacuddin	2025–26	Highland League	1	1	0	0	0	0	0	0	1	1
Clachnacuddin	Total		24	4	2	0	0	0	3	1	29	5
Career total			267	13	23	1	20	0	16	1	327	15

== Honours ==
Inverness Caledonian Thistle

- Scottish Cup: 2014–15

Brora Rangers

- Highland League Cup: 2021–22, 2023–24
- North of Scotland Cup: 2022–23

Individual

- SPL Young Player of the Month: March 2013
