= Dale Gillespie =

Scottish footballer (born 1989)

Personal information
- Date of birth: 19 June 1989 (age 37)
- Place of birth: Inverness, Scotland
- Position: Midfielder

Youth career
- Inverness Caledonian Thistle

Senior career*
| Years | Team | Apps | (Gls) |
| 2007–2009 | Inverness Caledonian Thistle | 0 | (0) |
| 2009 | → Elgin City (loan) | 17 | (0) |
| 2009–2012 | Nairn County | | |
| 2012–2017 | Brora Rangers | | |
| 2017–2018 | Rothes | | |
| 2018– | Brora Rangers | | |

International career
| 2007 | Scotland U19 | 2 | (0) |
- * Club domestic league appearances and goals as of 17:00, 5 November 2022 (UTC)

Dale Gillespie (born 19 June 1989) is a Scottish professional footballer who plays as a midfielder for Highland League club Brora Rangers.

== Playing career ==
Gillespie started his career as a youth player at Inverness Caledonian Thistle. He spent the second half of the 2008–2009 season on loan at Elgin City, making 17 appearances for the Black and Whites. Despite being an unused substitute on 4 October 2008 against Dundee United, he left the club in 2009 without making a single first-team appearance.

The midfielder signed for Nairn County in 2009 and spent 3 seasons at the Wee County.

He signed for Brora Rangers in 2012. Gillespie joined Rothes in 2017 but returned to the Cattachs in 2018. He aimed to return Brora to the Scottish Professional Football League.

== International career ==
Gillespie made his debut for Scotland Under 19's against Iceland on 10 September 2007. He made his second appearance the following month in a 1–0 win over Moldova.

== Personal life ==
He stopped drinking alcohol in July 2019 and believes it has benefited his career.
