= 2012–13 Highland League Cup =

2012–13 Breedon Aggregates Highland League Cup

Tournament details
- Country: Scotland
- Teams: 18

Final positions
- Champions: Keith
- Runner-up: Inverurie Loco Works

Tournament statistics
- Matches played: 17

The 2012–13 Breedon Highland League Cup was the 68th edition of the competition, which was sponsored by Breedon Aggregates. The winners were Keith, who defeated Inverurie Loco Works 2–1 in the final at Princess Royal Park in Banff on 11 May 2013.

== First round ==
In the first-round draw, fourteen clubs were given a bye into the second round, and four clubs were drawn to play each other in the first round. Ties in the first round took place on Saturday 2 March 2013.

Home team	Score	Away team
Clachnacuddin	3-2	Cove Rangers
Turriff United	1-2	Formartine United

== Second round ==
The ties in the second round took place on Saturday 16 March 2013.

Home team	Score	Away team
Brora Rangers	2-1	Wick Academy
Clachnacuddin	5-0	Fort William
Deveronvale	^{1}2-2	Fraserburgh
Forres Mechanics	1-3	Formartine United
Inverurie Loco Works	6-0	Huntly
Lossiemouth	2-5	Buckie Thistle
Nairn County	3-0	Strathspey Thistle
Rothes	0-2^{2}	Keith

^{1} After Extra Time – Deveronvale won 3–1 on penalties
^{2} Played on Wednesday 27 March 2013 due to 2 previous postponements due to a waterlogged pitch and a snowbound pitch

== Third round ==
The ties in the third round took place on Saturday 6 April 2013.

Home team	Score	Away team
Brora Rangers	4-2	Formartine United
Buckie Thistle	3-3^{1}	Keith
Inverurie Loco Works	4-1	Deveronvale
Nairn County	2-1	Clachnacuddin

^{1} After Extra Time – Keith won 5–4 on penalties

== Semi-finals ==
The semi-final ties took place on Saturday 20 April 2013.

Home team	Score	Away team
Inverurie Loco Works	2-0	Brora Rangers
Keith	1-0	Nairn County

== Final ==
11 May 2013
15:00 BST (UTC+01)

Keith	2–1	Inverurie Loco Works
Andy MacAskill 57'; Cammy Keith 75' (pen.)	The Scotsman	Scott Begg 17'

Princess Royal Park, Banff
Referee: Graham Beaton
