= 2013–14 Highland Football League =

Press & Journal Highland League
- Season: 2013–14
- Champions: Brora Rangers
- Matches: 306
- Goals: 1,208 (3.95 per match)
- Top goalscorer: Conor Gethins (35 goals)
- Biggest home win: 11–0 Brora Rangers v Strathspey Thistle
- Biggest away win: 0–9 Strathspey Thistle v Wick Academy
- Highest scoring: 11–0 Brora Rangers v Strathspey Thistle
- Longest winning run: 10 – Brora Rangers
- Longest unbeaten run: 19 – Brora Rangers
- Longest winless run: 24 – Fort William
- Longest losing run: 11 – Rothes

The 2013–14 Highland Football League kicked off on 3 August 2013 with the final round of fixtures being played on or before 10 May 2014. The defending champions were Cove Rangers. Brora Rangers were crowned champions for the first time in their history, while Fort William finished last. Brora set new Highland League records by achieving the highest points total and largest margin of victory in the league's history, and their win rate of 31 out of 34 (91.2%) was the highest since Clachnacuddin achieved 11 wins out of 12 (91.7%) in the 1903–04 season. In conceding just 16 goals during the season, Brora also beat Peterhead's previous postwar record of 19 conceded in the 1998–99 season, and became the first club ever to achieve a positive goal difference in excess of 100.

This was the first season in which the Highland League was integrated into the senior pyramid system at level 5, however it was confirmed as per the terms of restructuring that play-offs for a place in the SPFL would commence from 2014–15 onwards.

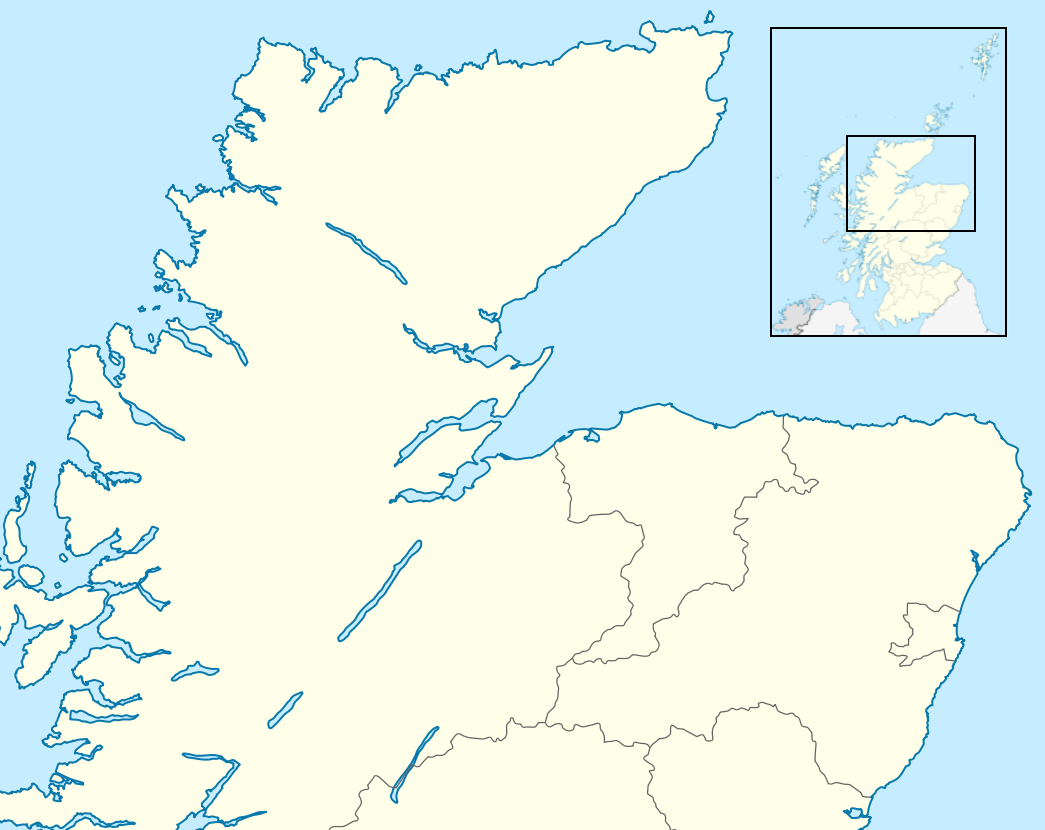
Location of teams in 2013–14 Highland Football League

== League table ==
Pos	Team	Pld	W	D	L	GF	GA	GD	Pts	Qualification
1	Brora Rangers (C)	34	31	2	1	123	16	+107	95	Qualification for 2014–15 Scottish Cup Second round
2	Inverurie Loco Works	34	23	6	5	97	39	+58	75	Qualification for 2014–15 Scottish Cup Second round
3	Nairn County	34	24	3	7	86	39	+47	75	
4	Formartine United	34	22	6	6	88	36	+52	72	
5	Fraserburgh	34	23	2	9	89	44	+45	71	
6	Deveronvale	34	20	5	9	64	43	+21	65	
7	Cove Rangers	34	16	7	11	91	62	+29	55	
8	Wick Academy	34	15	8	11	83	51	+32	53	
9	Forres Mechanics	34	15	7	12	68	50	+18	52	
10	Buckie Thistle	34	13	10	11	54	48	+6	49	
11	Clachnacuddin	34	13	7	14	67	64	+3	46	
12	Turriff United	34	13	5	16	60	57	+3	44	
13	Huntly	34	9	8	17	55	82	−27	35	
14	Keith	34	9	2	23	50	98	−48	29	
15	Lossiemouth	34	4	8	22	34	93	−59	20	
16	Strathspey Thistle	34	3	3	28	28	116	−88	12	
17	Rothes	34	3	3	28	36	136	−100	12	
18	Fort William	34	1	6	27	35	131	−96	9	

Source: Soccerway
Rules for classification: 1) Points; 2) Goal difference; 3) Number of goals scored
(C) Champions

== Results ==
Home \ Away	BROR	BUCK	CLAC	COVE	DEVE	FORM	FORR	FORT	FRAS	HUNT	LOCO	KEITH	LOSS	NAIRN	ROTH	STRA	TURR	WICK
Brora Rangers		1–0	5–1	3–1	3–0	2–0	6–0	6–1	0–1	4–2	2–1	9–0	6–0	4–3	6–0	11–0	2–0	2–1
Buckie Thistle	0–5		2–2	2–2	0–1	0–0	1–1	0–0	2–1	1–0	2–1	5–0	4–0	1–3	2–2	3–0	2–1	2–1
Clachnacuddin	1–5	0–3		1–4	0–2	1–1	3–1	4–0	1–1	1–2	2–2	2–1	5–0	2–1	8–1	2–1	1–0	1–4
Cove Rangers	0–3	4–1	3–2		1–1	3–1	3–2	5–3	0–1	2–2	1–2	7–1	3–0	1–2	4–1	4–2	5–3	5–2
Deveronvale	0–0	1–0	1–2	3–2		2–1	0–4	2–0	1–0	3–2	1–2	5–2	2–0	0–1	3–0	5–1	0–0	0–4
Formartine United	0–0	4–3	3–1	2–1	3–1		2–1	4–0	1–0	10–0	1–1	4–2	4–2	1–2	3–0	8–0	3–0	3–1
Forres Mechanics	0–1	0–2	2–1	3–1	4–1	2–2		6–0	1–3	1–1	1–2	3–1	2–0	1–2	2–0	3–0	2–3	2–2
Fort William	2–5	3–3	1–4	2–6	0–3	0–5	1–2		0–6	1–1	0–6	1–3	1–1	1–5	4–4	2–3	2–4	1–1
Fraserburgh	1–4	5–2	3–0	5–1	2–5	0–1	2–0	9–0		4–3	0–2	4–0	3–1	1–0	4–1	6–2	1–0	3–2
Huntly	0–6	0–0	1–5	1–3	1–1	1–4	1–2	3–2	1–3		1–5	3–1	4–1	1–3	6–0	1–1	2–2	2–2
Inverurie Loco Works	1–2	1–1	1–2	2–2	3–1	2–0	2–2	3–0	2–1	2–1		3–1	5–0	2–5	7–0	3–1	4–3	7–0
Keith	0–3	0–2	1–1	4–1	1–4	0–2	0–6	2–3	2–3	1–2	0–3		5–2	1–8	5–0	4–2	1–3	0–1
Lossiemouth	0–3	3–1	1–1	0–0	0–1	0–3	1–1	5–1	1–1	2–3	1–4	1–3		0–5	3–1	2–2	1–3	0–0
Nairn County	0–2	1–0	3–2	3–3	1–1	4–1	3–1	3–0	2–3	1–0	1–2	0–1	2–1		5–1	3–1	2–0	4–1
Rothes	0–4	1–4	2–4	0–9	1–2	2–3	2–7	3–2	0–5	1–2	0–5	3–5	1–1	0–3		2–0	0–3	0–7
Strathspey Thistle	0–6	1–2	2–1	0–3	0–4	0–3	1–2	1–0	2–3	1–3	0–4	0–1	1–2	0–0	2–5		0–2	0–9
Turriff United	0–1	1–1	3–2	1–0	0–4	1–4	0–0	5–0	1–4	3–0	2–3	1–1	7–0	2–3	3–0	1–0		1–2
Wick Academy	0–1	2–0	1–1	1–1	2–3	1–1	0–1	8–1	3–0	3–2	2–2	1–0	5–2	1–2	3–2	6–1	4–1	

Updated to match(es) played on 16 May 2014. Source: highlandfootballleague.com
Legend: Blue = home team win; Yellow = draw; Red = away team win.
