= 2013–14 North of Scotland Cup =

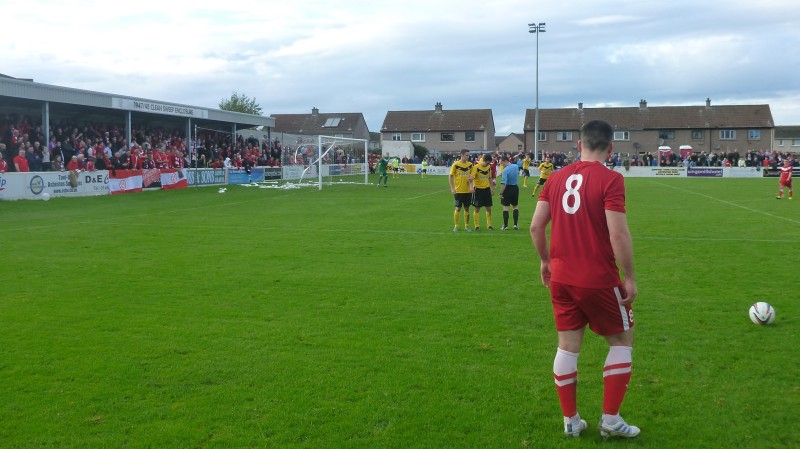
- 2013–14 North of Scotland Cup Final; Nairn County 0–3 Brora Rangers

Tournament details
- Country: Scotland
- Teams: 14

Final positions
- Champions: Brora Rangers
- Runner-up: Nairn County

Tournament statistics
- Matches played: 13
- Goals scored: 62 (4.77 per match)
- Top goal scorer(s): Zander Sutherland (6)

The 2013–14 North of Scotland Cup began on 27 July 2013 and ended on 19 October 2013, when eventual winners, Brora Rangers, defeated defending champions Nairn County 3–0 at Clachnacuddin's Grant Street Park in Inverness. It was sponsored by AJG Parcels for the second year.

== 2013-14 competing clubs ==
=== Scottish Professional Football League ===
- Inverness Caledonian Thistle

=== Highland Football League ===
- Brora Rangers
- Clachnacuddin
- Forres Mechanics
- Fort William
- Lossiemouth
- Nairn County
- Rothes
- Strathspey Thistle
- Wick Academy

=== North Caledonian Football League ===
- Golspie Sutherland
- Halkirk United
- Muir of Ord Rovers
- Thurso

== First round ==
| 27 July 2013 | Golspie Sutherland | 1–3 | Wick Academy | Golspie |
| 14:00 BST | Bobby Gunn 9' | | Sam Mackay 38', 67', 87' | Stadium: King George V Park; Referee: Graham Fraser |

| 27 July 2013 | Fort William | 1–0 | Muir of Ord Rovers | Fort William |
| 15:00 BST | Darren Quigg 50' | | | Stadium: Claggan Park; Referee: Wayne Cusiter |

| 30 July 2013 | Brora Rangers | 1–1 (3–0 p) | Inverness Caledonian Thistle | Brora |
| 19:30 BST | Zander Sutherland 40' | | Torbjørn Agdestein 43' | Stadium: Dudgeon Park; Attendance: 250; Referee: Graham Fraser |
| | Penalties |
| | Zander Sutherland (penalty scored); Steven Mackay (penalty scored); Gavin Morrison (penalty scored) | | (penalty missed) Ben Greenhalgh; (penalty missed) Joe Gorman; (penalty missed) Danny Devine |

| 30 July 2013 | Nairn County | 3–1 | Strathspey Thistle | Nairn |
| 20:00 BST | Martin MacDonald; Conor Gethins; Andrew Neill | | Gavin Chisholm | Stadium: Station Park; Referee: Morag Pirie |

| 31 July 2013 | Halkirk Utd | 4–5 | Clachnacuddin | Halkirk |
| 20:00 BST | Ben Murray 7'; Gordon McNab 40'; Grant McNab 55'; Alan Hughes 90+1' | | Kyle Whyte 10'; Gordon Morrison 33'; John Mackay 58'; John Budge 61' (o.g.); Andrew Cumming 63' (o.g.) | Stadium: Morrison Park; Referee: Graham Elder |

| 31 July 2013 | Rothes | 1–3 | Lossiemouth | Rothes |
| 20:00 BST | Sean McIntosh 55' | | Liam Archibald 42'; Darren Bailey 78'; Scott Wilson 88' | Stadium: Mackessack Park; Referee: Mike McNab |

| Forres Mechanics | bye |

| Thurso | bye |

== Second round ==
| 7 August 2013 | Lossiemouth | 0–3 | Forres Mechanics | Lossiemouth |
| 20:00 BST | | | Scott Lawrie 26'; Craig McGovern 52'; Simon Allan 55' | Stadium: Grant Park; Referee: Craig Sim |

| 7 August 2013 | Wick Academy | 4–3 | Clachnacuddin | Wick |
| 20:00 BST | Gary Weir 25'; Richard Macadie 37', 49'; Bryan McKiddie 85' | | Gordon Morrison 52'; Martin Laing 58', 68' | Stadium: Harmsworth Park; Referee: Graham Fraser |

| 13 August 2013 | Nairn County | 5–1 | Fort William | Nairn |
| 20:00 BST | John Cameron 42'; Martin Macdonald 48'; Archie MacPhee 63'; Conor Gethins 74'; Ross Naismith 85' | | Gordon McCarroll 23' | Stadium: Station Park; Referee: Mike McNab |

| 13 August 2013 | Thurso | 0–5 | Brora Rangers | Halkirk |
| 20:00 BST | | | Zander Sutherland 6'; Dale Gillespie 45', 50'; Andrew Greig 68'; Liam Baxter 88' | Stadium: Morrison Park; Attendance: 200; Referee: Graham Elder |

== Semi finals ==
| 3 September 2013 | Nairn County | 2–0 | Forres Mechanics | Nairn |
| 20:00 BST | Conor Gethins 43', 89' (pen.) | | | Stadium: Station Park; Referee: Andy Milne |

| 4 September 2013 | Brora Rangers | 6–2 | Wick Academy | Brora |
| 20:00 BST | Zander Sutherland 6', 12', 36' (pen.); Ross Tokely 16'; Steven Mackay 18'; Martin Maclean 27' | | Davie Allan 4'; Richard Macadie 10' | Stadium: Dudgeon Park; Attendance: 600; Referee: Graham Fraser |

== Final ==
19 October 2013
15:00 BST

| Nairn County | 0–3 | Brora Rangers |
|---|---|---|
| | Report | Zander Sutherland 2'; Richie Hart 17'; Martin Maclean 59' |

Grant Street Park, Inverness
Attendance: 1800
Referee: Graham Beaton
