= Zander Sutherland =

Scottish footballer

Personal information
- Full name: Alexander George Sutherland
- Date of birth: 7 September 1987 (age 39)
- Place of birth: Wick, Scotland
- Height: 5 ft 2 in (1.57 m)
- Position: Winger

Senior career*
Years	Team	Apps	(Gls)
2005–2009	Inverness Caledonian Thistle	9	(0)
2008	→ Elgin City (loan)	32	(3)
2009–2010	Peterhead	2	(0)
2011–2013	Buckie Thistle		
2013–2018	Brora Rangers		
Total		43	(3)
- * Club domestic league appearances and goals

Alexander Sutherland (born 7 September 1987) is a Scottish former professional footballer who last played for Brora Rangers. Born in Wick, he grew up in the village of Helmsdale in Sutherland.

He made his début for Inverness Caledonian Thistle in a home game against Falkirk. In the next season, 2006–07, Sutherland's appearances were limited by manager Charlie Christie. His first game of the season saw him come on as a substitute against Dunfermline Athletic in September. However, he did not play with the first team again until December in a game against Kilmarnock. He conceded a penalty kick which was the winning goal in a 4–3 win for Killie. Sutherland did not play again until April, against Kilmarnock again and then Dunfermline again in May.

He scored his first goal for the club in July 2007, in a pre-season victory over Clachnacuddin. When Craig Brewster was appointed manager in September 2007, Sutherland was sent on loan to Elgin City on loan for the season. This proved to be a good move for Sutherland, as he was voted Elgin's player of the season, only missed a handful of games and was nominated for the Third Division player of the year. He returned to Inverness CT in April 2008, and signed a new one-year contract in the same month, but left the club at the end of the contract.

He joined Buckie Thistle in 2011 and then moved to Brora Rangers in 2013.
