= 2020–21 Highland Football League =

Breedon Highland League
- Season: 2020–21
- Dates: 28 November 2020 – 30 March 2021
- Champions: Brora Rangers
- Matches: 16
- Goals: 76 (4.75 per match)
- Biggest home win: Fraserburgh 13–1 Turriff United (2 January 2021)
- Biggest away win: Fort William 0–10 Brora Rangers (19 December 2020)
- Highest scoring: Fraserburgh 13–1 Turriff United (2 January 2021)
- Longest winning run: 3 matches: Brora Rangers & Fraserburgh
- Longest unbeaten run: 3 matches: Brora Rangers & Fraserburgh
- Longest winless run: 3 matches: Deveronvale & Huntly
- Longest losing run: 2 matches: 3 teams

The 2020–21 Highland Football League (known as the Breedon Highland League for sponsorship reasons) was the 118th season of the Highland Football League, and the 7th season as the fifth tier of the Scottish football pyramid system.

Due to the COVID-19 pandemic, the league announced in August 2020 that the season would start in October with a shortened a 16-game schedule (teams playing each other once). In late September, the start date was deferred until at least 28 November because the member clubs said they could not play fixtures without fans. The season started on 28 November, but Forres Mechanics withdrew just beforehand (reducing the schedule to 15 games).

On 11 January 2021 the league was suspended by the Scottish Football Association due to the escalating pandemic situation.

Despite having only completed three fixtures, Brora Rangers were declared champions for the second successive season using a points per game formula. The decision was announced by the Highland League on 30 March 2021. Two teams (Clachnacuddin and Fort William) had only played one game and Strathspey Thistle had not played at all.

Brora Rangers faced the winners of the 2020–21 Lowland Football League (Kelty Hearts) in the Pyramid play-off, losing 6–1 on aggregate.

== Teams ==
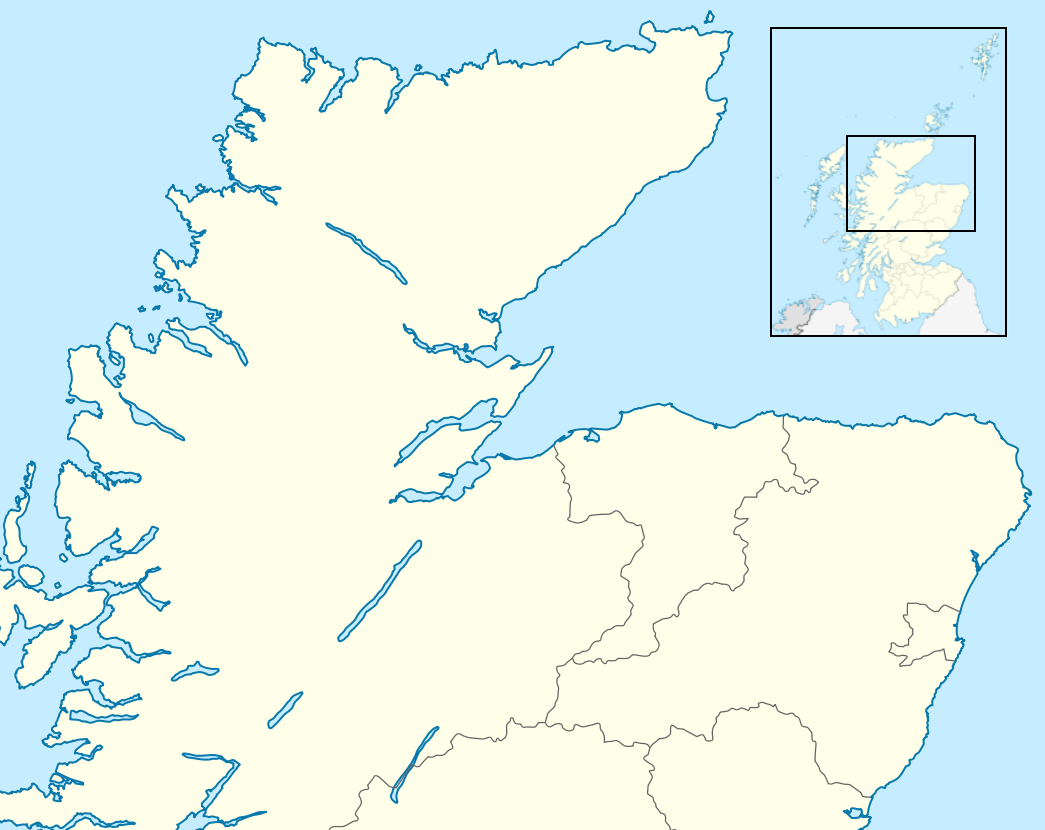
Location of teams in 2020–21 Highland Football League

=== Stadia and locations ===
All grounds are equipped with floodlights as required by league regulations.

Team	Location	Stadium	Capacity	Seats
Brora Rangers	Brora	Dudgeon Park	4,000	200
Buckie Thistle	Buckie	Victoria Park	5,000	400
Clachnacuddin	Inverness	Grant Street Park	2,074	154
Deveronvale	Banff	Princess Royal Park	2,600	360
Formartine United	Pitmedden	North Lodge Park	2,500	300
Fort William	Fort William	Claggan Park	4,000	400
Fraserburgh	Fraserburgh	Bellslea Park	3,000	480
Huntly	Huntly	Christie Park	2,200	270
Inverurie Loco Works	Inverurie	Harlaw Park	2,500	250
Keith	Keith	Kynoch Park	4,000	370
Lossiemouth	Lossiemouth	Grant Park	2,050	250
Nairn County	Nairn	Station Park	2,250	250
Rothes	Rothes	Mackessack Park	2,700	184
Strathspey Thistle	Grantown-on-Spey	Seafield Park	1,600	150
Turriff United	Turriff	The Haughs	2,135	135
Wick Academy	Wick	Harmsworth Park	2,412	102

=== Withdrawn ===
Team	Location	Stadium	Capacity	Seats
Forres Mechanics	Forres	Mosset Park	2,700	502

== League table ==
Pos	Team	Pld	W	D	L	GF	GA	GD	Pts	PPG	Promotion or qualification
1	Brora Rangers (C)	3	3	0	0	20	1	+19	9	3.00	Qualification for the Pyramid play-off
2	Fraserburgh	3	3	0	0	16	1	+15	9	3.00	
3	Buckie Thistle	2	2	0	0	8	3	+5	6	3.00	
4	Formartine United	2	2	0	0	7	2	+5	6	3.00	
5	Inverurie Loco Works	2	2	0	0	6	2	+4	6	3.00	
6	Keith	2	1	0	1	2	3	−1	3	1.50	
7	Rothes	2	1	0	1	2	5	−3	3	1.50	
8	Huntly	3	0	2	1	3	4	−1	2	0.67	
9	Lossiemouth	2	0	1	1	2	4	−2	1	0.50	
10	Deveronvale	3	0	1	2	2	8	−6	1	0.33	
11	Strathspey Thistle	0	0	0	0	0	0	0	0	—	
12	Clachnacuddin	1	0	0	1	2	4	−2	0	0.00	
13	Nairn County	2	0	0	2	1	3	−2	0	0.00	
14	Wick Academy	2	0	0	2	3	8	−5	0	0.00	
15	Fort William	1	0	0	1	0	10	−10	0	0.00	
16	Turriff United	2	0	0	2	2	18	−16	0	0.00	

Source: Highland Football League BBC Sport Soccerway
Rules for classification: 1) Points per game; 2) Goal difference; 3) Number of goals scored
(C) Champions

== Results ==
Home \ Away	BRO	BUC	CLA	DEV	FOU	FOW	FRA	HUN	INV	KEI	LOS	NAI	ROT	STR	TUR	WIC
Brora Rangers																5–1
Buckie Thistle																
Clachnacuddin									2–4							
Deveronvale	0–5									1–2						
Formartine United												2–1				
Fort William	0–10 (Note: Match played at Dudgeon Park, Brora.)															
Fraserburgh															13–1	
Huntly				1–1												
Inverurie Loco Works										2–0						
Keith																
Lossiemouth							0–2	2–2								
Nairn County							0–1									
Rothes		1–5						1–0								
Strathspey Thistle																
Turriff United					1–5											
Wick Academy		2–3														

Updated to match(es) played on 2 January 2021. Source: Highland Football League
Legend: Blue = home team win; Yellow = draw; Red = away team win.
