= Cameron Gilchrist =

Scottish footballer

Personal information
- Date of birth: 29 July 1997 (age 29)
- Position: Defender

Youth career
- Leicester City
- Swansea City

Senior career*
Years	Team	Apps	(Gls)
2016–2017	Inverness Caledonian Thistle	1	(0)
2017	Barwell (Note: Dual registration)	4	(0)
2017–2018	AFC Rushden & Diamonds	9	(0)
2018	→ Hinckley (loan)	2	(0)
- * Club domestic league appearances and goals as of 11:11, 13 April 2017 (UTC)

Cameron Gilchrist (born 29 July 1997) is a Scottish professional footballer who plays as a defender.

== Career ==
Gilchrist played youth football for Leicester City and Swansea City, and made one appearance in the Scottish Premiership for Inverness Caledonian Thistle during the 2016–17 season. After signing for Barwell, he moved to AFC Rushden & Diamonds in October 2017 on dual registration terms, having made 4 league appearances for Barwell.

He moved on loan from AFC Rushden & Diamonds to Hinckley in late September 2018, He left AFC Rushden & Diamonds a few days later, having made 9 league appearances for them. He made two league appearances for Hinckley.
