= Cameron Mackay =

Scottish footballer

Cammy Mackay
Personal information
- Date of birth: 9 December 1996 (age 29)
- Place of birth: Inverness, Scotland
- Position: Goalkeeper

Team information
- Current team: Brora Rangers

Youth career
- 2013–2016: Inverness Caledonian Thistle

Senior career*
Years	Team	Apps	(Gls)
2013–2014	→ Clachnacuddin (loan)		
2015–2024	Inverness Caledonian Thistle	22	(0)
2016	→ Elgin City (loan)	3	(0)
2016–2017	→ Elgin City (loan)	15	(0)
2017	→ Brora Rangers (loan)		
2018	→ Brora Rangers (loan)		
2018–2019	→ Rothes (loan)	13	(0)
2024–	Brora Rangers		
- * Club domestic league appearances and goals as of 11 June 2024 (UTC)

Cameron "Cammy" Mackay (born 9 December 1996) is a Scottish footballer who plays as a goalkeeper for Highland League club Brora Rangers.

== Career ==
He made his debut for Inverness Caledonian Thistle in May 2015, coming on as a late substitute for Ryan Esson, in a game against Celtic at Parkhead. The following week, he was an unused substitute for Inverness as they won the Scottish Cup Final at Hampden Park.

Mackay was loaned out to Scottish League Two side Elgin City at the start of the 2016–17 season, however, his move was cut short and he returned to Thistle temporarily in September 2016 to provide goalkeeping cover after second-choice keeper Ryan Esson suffered an elbow injury. On 29 October 2016, Mackay made his first league start for Inverness against Hearts after Owain Fôn Williams was injured in the pre-match warm-up. Mackay subsequently returned to Elgin City on loan in December 2016.

Mackay signed a pre-contract deal with Highland League side Brora Rangers after being part of relegated Inverness Caledonian Thistle.
