= 2019–20 Highland Football League =

Highland Football League
- Season: 2019–20
- Dates: 27 July 2019 – 11 March 2020
- Champions: Brora Rangers
- Matches: 213
- Goals: 834 (3.92 per match)
- Biggest home win: Brora Rangers 7–0 Lossiemouth (17 August 2019); Inverurie Loco Works 8–1 Turriff United (14 December 2019); Fraserburgh 7–0 Huntly (11 March 2020)
- Biggest away win: Lossiemouth 0–8 Brora Rangers (21 December 2019)
- Highest scoring: Keith 2–8 Buckie Thistle (10 August 2019)
- Longest winning run: 15 matches: Brora Rangers
- Longest unbeaten run: 15 matches: Brora Rangers
- Longest winless run: 11 matches: Lossiemouth
- Longest losing run: 11 matches: Lossiemouth
- All statistics correct as of 11 March 2020.

The 2019–20 Highland Football League (known as the Breedon Highland League for sponsorship reasons) was the 117th season of the Highland Football League, and the 6th season as the fifth tier of the Scottish football pyramid system. The season began on 27 July 2019 and was scheduled to end on 18 April 2020. Cove Rangers were the reigning champions, but could not defend their title after being promoted to Scottish League Two.

On 13 March 2020, the league was indefinitely suspended due to the 2019–20 coronavirus outbreak and later curtailed. On 21 March, Brora Rangers were awarded the title following a vote of the league's member clubs. League positions were confirmed in August 2020 based on points per game in the curtailed season.

== Teams ==
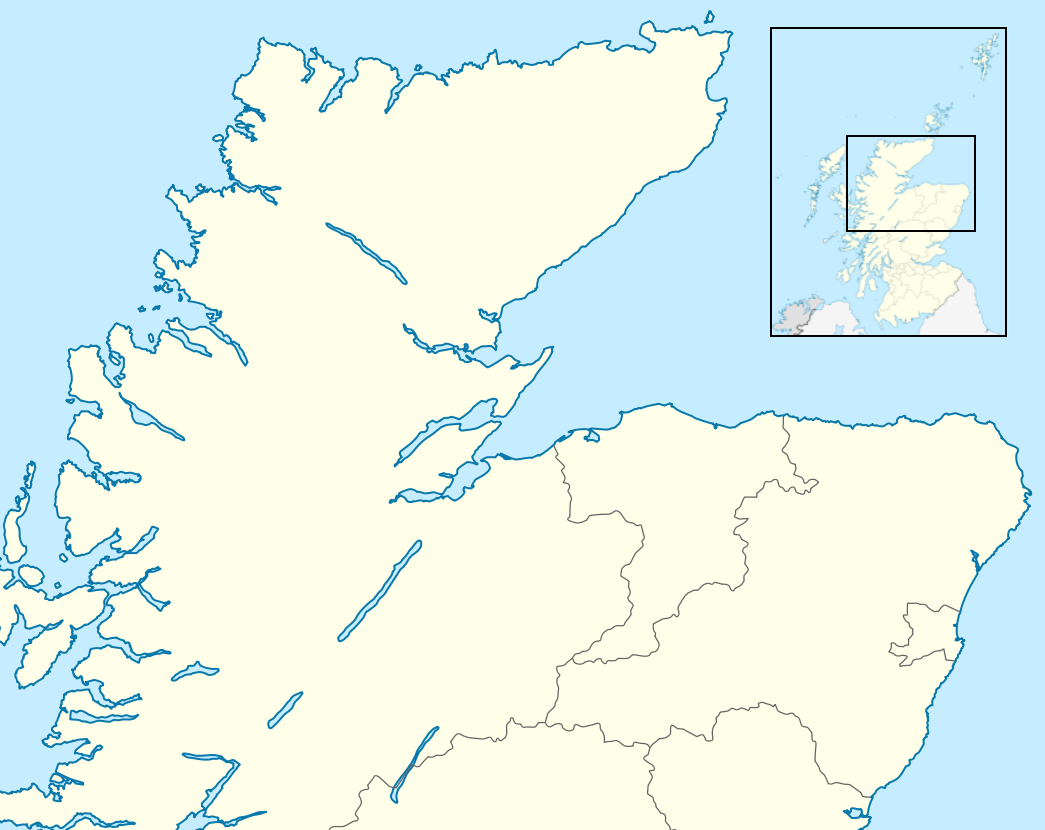
Location of teams in 2019–20 Highland Football League

The following teams changed division after the 2018–19 season.

=== From Highland League ===
Promoted to League Two

- Cove Rangers

Following promotion of Cove Rangers whose 33-year stay in the division came to an end, the league decided in May 2019 to play the 2019–20 season with 17 teams, rather than invite a new member to replace Cove.

=== Stadia and locations ===
All grounds are equipped with floodlights as required by league regulations.

Team	Location	Stadium	Capacity	Seats
Brora Rangers	Brora	Dudgeon Park	4,000	200
Buckie Thistle	Buckie	Victoria Park	5,000	400
Clachnacuddin	Inverness	Grant Street Park	2,074	154
Deveronvale	Banff	Princess Royal Park	2,600	360
Formartine United	Pitmedden	North Lodge Park	2,500	300
Forres Mechanics	Forres	Mosset Park	2,700	502
Fort William	Fort William	Claggan Park	4,000	400
Fraserburgh	Fraserburgh	Bellslea Park	3,000	480
Huntly	Huntly	Christie Park	2,200	270
Inverurie Loco Works	Inverurie	Harlaw Park	2,500	250
Keith	Keith	Kynoch Park	4,000	370
Lossiemouth	Lossiemouth	Grant Park	2,050	250
Nairn County	Nairn	Station Park	2,250	250
Rothes	Rothes	Mackessack Park	2,700	184
Strathspey Thistle	Grantown-on-Spey	Seafield Park	1,600	150
Turriff United	Turriff	The Haughs	2,135	135
Wick Academy	Wick	Harmsworth Park	2,412	102

== League table ==
Pos	Team	Pld	W	D	L	GF	GA	GD	Pts	PPG
1	Brora Rangers (C)	26	24	0	2	96	14	+82	72	2.77
2	Fraserburgh	23	17	4	2	79	23	+56	55	2.39
3	Rothes	23	17	2	4	53	22	+31	53	2.30
4	Buckie Thistle	24	17	2	5	64	35	+29	53	2.21
5	Inverurie Loco Works	28	19	2	7	80	40	+40	59	2.11
6	Formartine United	23	14	2	7	62	21	+41	44	1.91
7	Nairn County	22	12	3	7	39	41	−2	39	1.77
8	Forres Mechanics	27	13	4	10	67	49	+18	43	1.59
9	Wick Academy	25	9	5	11	38	47	−9	32	1.28
10	Keith	27	10	4	13	50	65	−15	34	1.26
11	Deveronvale	27	9	4	14	42	56	−14	31	1.15
12	Huntly	27	6	6	15	35	73	−38	24	0.89
13	Strathspey Thistle	22	6	1	15	29	54	−25	19	0.86
14	Turriff United	27	5	3	19	33	83	−50	18	0.67
15	Clachnacuddin	27	4	4	19	27	63	−36	16	0.59
16	Fort William	20	3	1	16	18	61	−43	10	0.50
17	Lossiemouth	28	4	1	23	22	87	−65	13	0.46

Source: Highland Football League BBC Sport Soccerway
Rules for classification: 1) Points; 2) Goal difference; 3) Number of goals scored
(C) Champions

== Results ==
Home \ Away	BRO	BUC	CLA	DEV	FOU	FOM	FOW	FRA	HUN	INV	KEI	LOS	NAI	ROT	STR	TUR	WIC
Brora Rangers		7–0	N/A	4–2	N/A	1–0	6–0	0–1	6–0	4–0	3–1	7–0	5–0	2–1	N/A	3–0	4–1
Buckie Thistle	N/A		2–1	5–2	1–0	3–1	4–0	1–3	4–2	0–0	N/A	3–1	2–1	N/A	2–1	4–1	4–0
Clachnacuddin	1–2	0–2		1–4	0–3	2–3	0–1 (Note: Match played at Canal Park, Inverness.)	N/A	0–0	N/A	3–4	2–0	N/A	N/A	2–1	2–2	1–2
Deveronvale	0–2	0–1	1–1		3–0	1–3	2–2	0–3	4–0	1–2	0–2	N/A	0–2	1–2	3–2	1–0	1–1
Formartine United	N/A	2–1	5–1	4–1		3–0	5–2	1–2	5–0	1–2	1–2	4–1	N/A	N/A	N/A	5–0	1–2
Forres Mechanics	1–3	2–2	3–0	1–2	N/A		6–0	N/A	6–1	0–4	4–0	5–4	N/A	1–1	7–1	N/A	2–2
Fort William	N/A	N/A	1–0	N/A	N/A	1–2 (Note: Match played at Mosset Park, Forres.)		N/A	N/A	1–4	0–1	0–2 (Note: Match played at Grant Park, Lossiemouth.)	N/A	N/A	0–1	3–5	1–4
Fraserburgh	1–2	3–2	6–0	N/A	1–1	3–3	6–3		7–0	2–3	4–0	6–0	3–1	N/A	N/A	4–0	5–0
Huntly	0–4	4–3	3–0	2–3	0–0	1–4	N/A	2–2		2–4	2–2	2–1	3–4	1–3	N/A	3–1	3–2
Inverurie Loco Works	1–6	1–3	4–1	3–1	N/A	3–1	N/A	1–4	1–1		4–0	7–1	5–1	5–0	4–1	8–1	0–1
Keith	2–3	2–8	1–3	N/A	0–5	4–1	4–0	N/A	0–1	1–3		N/A	1–1	2–3	7–1	2–1	2–2
Lossiemouth	0–8	0–5	3–4	0–2	N/A	0–4	2–0	0–3	1–0	0–2	2–3		0–0	0–3	0–2	3–0	0–2
Nairn County	1–0	N/A	2–1	7–2	0–6	0–3	N/A	2–2	3–1	3–2	2–1	N/A		0–2	4–1	N/A	1–0
Rothes	0–1	N/A	3–0	4–0	2–0	4–1	N/A	N/A	2–0	2–0	4–0	3–0	1–2		3–2	3–0	3–1
Strathspey Thistle	1–5	N/A	2–0	N/A	N/A	2–1	2–0	N/A	1–1	0–1	1–3	3–0	0–2	1–2		2–4	N/A
Turriff United	0–7	N/A	2–0	0–3	0–1	1–4	1–2	1–6	N/A	1–6	3–3	2–0	N/A	2–2	3–1		2–3
Wick Academy	0–1	1–2	1–1	2–2	0–5	0–2	4–1	0–2	N/A	N/A	N/A	5–1	N/A	N/A	N/A	2–0	

Source: Highland Football League
Legend: Blue = home team win; Yellow = draw; Red = away team win.
