= Highland League Cup =

Association football tournament in Scotland

The Highland League Cup is a knock-out tournament contested since 1946 by football clubs in the Highland Football League.

Turriff United are the current holders, while Keith are the most successful club, with 10 trophy wins.

Season	Winner	Score	Runner-up
1946–47	Forres Mechanics	5–2	Elgin City
1947–48	Clachnacuddin	2–1	Forres Mechanics
1948–49	Huntly	5–2	Elgin City
1949–50	Ross County	4–1	Buckie Thistle
1950–51	Clachnacuddin	3–2	Lossiemouth
1951–52	Huntly	4–1	Forres Mechanics
1952–53	Caledonian	2–1 _{(after ?–? draw)}	Buckie Thistle
1953–54	Buckie Thistle	3–2	Caledonian
1954–55	Forres Mechanics	2–1 _{(after 3–3 draw)}	Caledonian
1955–56	Buckie Thistle	1–0	Peterhead
1956–57	Buckie Thistle	2–1	Caledonian
1957–58	Buckie Thistle	5–1	Nairn County
1958–59	Fraserburgh	4–2	Inverness Thistle
1959–60	Elgin City	3–2	Clachnacuddin
1960–61	Buckie Thistle	3–1	Caledonian
1961–62	Lossiemouth	2–0	Deveronvale
1962–63	Peterhead	6–0	Huntly
1963–64	Nairn County	5–1	Peterhead
1964–65	Keith	1–0	Nairn County
1965–66	Peterhead	4–1	Elgin City
1966–67	Elgin City	3–2 _{(after 2–2 draw)}	Caledonian
1967–68	Peterhead	1–0 _{(after 2–2 draw)}	Keith
1968–69	Ross County	2–0	Peterhead
1969–70	Caledonian	2–1	Peterhead
1970–71	Inverness Thistle	6–1	Clachnacuddin
1971–72	Caledonian	6–1 _{(after 3–3 draw)}	Huntly
1972–73	Inverness Thistle	5–4	Fraserburgh
1973–74	Keith	3–2	Ross County
1974–75	Keith	6–2 _{(after 2–2 draw)}	Ross County
1975–76	Keith	3–1	Ross County
1976–77	Caledonian	5–4	Inverness Thistle
1977–78	Caledonian	4–2	Huntly
1978–79	Ross County	3–1	Rothes
1979–80	Buckie Thistle	3–2	Inverness Thistle
1980–81	Peterhead	1–0	Brora Rangers
1981–82	Clachnacuddin	2–1 _{(a.e.t.)}	Brora Rangers
1982–83	Elgin City	4–3	Peterhead
1983–84	Keith	1–0	Buckie Thistle
1984–85	Forres Mechanics	1–0	Buckie Thistle
1985–86	Keith	3–1	Elgin City
1986–87	Buckie Thistle	5–0	Ross County
1987–88	Inverness Thistle	1–0	Buckie Thistle
1988–89	Keith	3–2 _{(after 1–1 draw)}	Caledonian
1989–90	Peterhead	2–1	Forres Mechanics
1990–91	Elgin City	2–1	Cove Rangers
1991–92	Ross County	3–1	Fraserburgh
1992–93	Huntly	1–1 _{(5–4 on pens.)}	Cove Rangers
1993–94	Huntly	4–1	Fraserburgh
1994–95	Cove Rangers	2–2 _{(5–3 on pens.)}	Lossiemouth
1995–96	Huntly	2–1 _{(a.e.t.)}	Cove Rangers
1996–97	Lossiemouth	2–1	Fraserburgh
1997–98	Elgin City	1–0	Cove Rangers
1998–99	Forres Mechanics	1–0	Keith
1999–00	Cove Rangers	4–3	Elgin City
2000–01	Forres Mechanics	2–1	Deveronvale
2001–02	Forres Mechanics	1–1 _{(4–3 on pens.)}	Deveronvale
2002–03	Keith	3–2	Deveronvale
2003–04	Clachnacuddin	3–0	Forres Mechanics
2004–05	Cove Rangers	2–0	Deveronvale
2005–06	Fraserburgh	4–1	Cove Rangers
2006–07	Keith	5–0	Buckie Thistle
2007–08	Inverurie Loco Works	3–1	Cove Rangers
2008–09	Inverurie Loco Works	2–1 _{(a.e.t.)}	Fraserburgh
2009–10	Forres Mechanics	2–0	Rothes
2010–11	Nairn County	4–0	Fraserburgh
2011–12	Buckie Thistle	2–0	Cove Rangers
2012–13	Keith	2–1	Inverurie Loco Works
2013–14	Clachnacuddin	3–3 _{(4–3 on pens.)}	Buckie Thistle
2014–15	Cove Rangers	4–0	Wick Academy
2015–16	Brora Rangers	0–0 _{(5–4 on pens.)}	Nairn County
2016–17	Cove Rangers	2–1	Formartine United
2017–18	Formartine United	2–1	Fraserburgh
2018–19	Cove Rangers	2–0	Formartine United
2019–20	Rothes	2–1	Buckie Thistle
2020–21	No Competition		
2021–22	Brora Rangers	2–1	Buckie Thistle
2022–23	Banks o' Dee	1–0	Inverurie Loco Works
2023–24	Brora Rangers	1–1 _{(5–4 on pens.)}	Fraserburgh
2024–25	Brora Rangers	3–1	Fraserburgh
2025–26	Turriff United	3–0	Formartine United

== Performance by club ==
Club	Wins	Last win	Last final lost
Keith	10	2012–13	1998–99
Buckie Thistle	8	2011–12	2021–22
Forres Mechanics	7	2009–10	2003–04
Cove Rangers	6	2018–19	2011–12
Clachnacuddin	5	2013–14	1970–71
Elgin City	5	1997–98	1999–00
Huntly	5	1995–96	1971–72
Peterhead	5	1989–90	1982–83
Caledonian	5	1977–78	1988–89
Brora Rangers	4	2024–25	1981–82
Ross County	4	1991–92	1986–87
Inverness Thistle	3	1987–88	1979–80
Nairn County	2	2010–11	2015–16
Inverurie Loco Works	2	2008–09	2022–23
Fraserburgh	2	2005–06	2024–25
Lossiemouth	2	1996–97	1994–95
Turriff United	1	2025–26	-
Banks o' Dee	1	2022–23	-
Rothes	1	2019–20	2009–10
Formartine United	1	2017–18	2025–26
Wick Academy	0	-	2014–15
Deveronvale	0	-	2004–05
