= Keith F.C. =

Association football club in Scotland

Keith
- Full name: Keith Football Club
- Nickname: The Maroons
- Founded: 1910
- Ground: Kynoch Park, Keith
- Capacity: 2,362 (370 seated)
- Coordinates: 57.539962°N 2.94605°W
- Chairman: Andrew Troup
- Manager: Craig Ewen
- League: Highland League
- 2025–26: Highland League, 7th of 18
Home colours	Away colours

Keith Football Club are a senior football club who currently play in the Highland League in Scotland. They were founded in 1910 and play at Kynoch Park in Keith, Moray. Although the town of Keith is relatively small, the club have produced a few notable players such as Hamish French and former Scotland captain, Colin Hendry.

Due to them being a senior team, they can compete in the Scottish Cup. In a 1995–96 Scottish Cup match at Pittodrie Stadium in Aberdeen, the club suffered a 10–1 defeat at the hands of Rangers.

== History ==
The club's first pitch was Seafield Park, where they played in the Huntly & District League. Their second pitch is their current ground of Kynoch Park, which was donated by Sir John W Kynoch in 1922. Keith entered the Highland League in 1924.

Their record home defeat was 1–9 against Elgin City in 1925. Keith's first ever Scottish Cup tie was in 1926, which resulted in a 7–3 defeat at Peebles Rovers. Kynoch Park hosted its first Scottish Cup game in 1928, with Keith recording a 5–2 win against Dalbeattie Star. They went on to lose 6–1 in the second round against Scottish Cup holders Celtic in front of a record crowd of 5,820. This was Celtic's first competitive appearance north of Aberdeen.

== Honours ==
- Highland Football League –
  - Winners (7): 1961–62, 1978–79, 1979–80, 1980–81, 1984–85, 1999–00, 2006–07
    - Runners Up (7): 1931–32, 1960–61, 1974–75, 1983–84, 1996–97, 2002–03, 2007–08
- Highland League Cup –
  - Winners (10): 1964–65, 1973–74, 1974–75, 1975–76, 1983–84, 1985–86, 1988–89, 2002–03, 2006–07, 2012–13
    - Runners Up (2): 1967–68, 1998–99
- Aberdeenshire Cup –
  - Winners (8): 1935–36, 1957–58, 1959–60, 1966–67, 1973–74, 1977–78, 1979–80, 2008–09
- Aberdeenshire Shield –
  - Winners (5): 1997–98, 2001–02, 2004–05, 2005–06, 2006–07
    - Runners Up (3): 1993–94, 1998–99, 1999–2000
- Scottish Qualifying Cup (North) –
  - Winners (4): 1960–61, 1962–63, 1984–85, 2002–03
- Aberdeenshire League –
  - Winners (6): 1935–36, 1996–97, 1998–99, 1999–2000, 2001–02, 2006–07
- Elgin District Cup –
  - Winners (2): 1927–28, 1929–30
- Elginshire Charity Cup –
  - Winners (1): 1923–24
