= Brora Rangers F.C. =

Association football club in Scotland

Brora Rangers
- Full name: Brora Rangers Football Club
- Nickname: The Cattachs
- Founded: 1879; 147 years ago
- Ground: Dudgeon Park, Brora
- Capacity: 4,000 (200 seated)
- Coordinates: 58.0083°N 3.8583°W
- Chairman: Scott Mackay
- Manager: Steven Mackay
- League: Highland League
- 2025–26: Highland League, 1st of 18 (champions)
- Website: https://brorarangers.football/
Home colours	Away colours

Brora Rangers Football Club are a Scottish football club from the village of Brora, Sutherland, in the Highland council area of Scotland. They play in the Highland League, of which they have been champions six times, having won their first title in 2013–14 and successfully defended it in the 2014–15 season. They were awarded the title in the 2019–20 and 2020–21 seasons which were incomplete due to the coronavirus pandemic and would win it again on goal difference in 2024–25.

They have won the North of Scotland Cup nine times and the Highland League Cup on three occasions.

Nicknamed the Cattachs, Brora Rangers play at Dudgeon Park, Brora, and hold a rivalry with neighbours Wick Academy, in the Northern Derby.

== History ==
=== Early history ===
Brora Rangers were founded in 1879. In 1933 they gained access to membership of the Scottish Football Association and entered the draw for the Scottish Qualifying Cup competition. They were accepted into membership of the Highland Football League in 1962.

They won the North of Scotland Qualifying Cup competition in their centenary year of 1979, when they defeated Peterhead 5–0 on 17 November after a replay at Grant Street Park, Inverness, the teams having played a goalless draw the previous week.

=== History since 2013 ===
The club won their first ever Highland Football League title in the 2013–14 season after a 3–0 win against Keith on 5 March at Kynoch Park. They are the most northerly club to win the League title to date. They set several postwar Highland League records over the season: most points (95), greatest margin of victory in the league (20 points), highest win rate (31 out of 34), fewest goals conceded (16) and highest positive goal difference (+107). They ended the season with a 19-game unbeaten run which subsequently carried on into the 2014–15 season. With a draw against Fraserburgh in their 38th and final match of the year (across two seasons), Brora achieved the distinction of being unbeaten in league matches for the whole of 2014. Their unbeaten run in the Highland League eventually extended to 57 matches across three seasons, ending with a 3–0 defeat by Cove Rangers on 22 August 2015.

For the 2014–15 season, they started in the second round of the 2014–15 Scottish Cup, and they played for the first time in the 2014–15 Scottish Challenge Cup but lost in the second round to East Fife 3–2. The club retained its Highland League title in the 2014–15 season, scoring a postwar record of 125 goals in a Highland League season, beating Inverness Thistle's previous postwar record of 124 in the 1969–70 season. With a record of 30 wins and 4 draws Brora ended the season as unbeaten champions, and were only the second club to complete an unbeaten season in the postwar era (following Caledonian in 1982–83). As Highland League champions, Brora entered the newly introduced promotion playoffs against Lowland League champions Edinburgh City. They won 4–2 in a penalty shootout after a 2–2 aggregate draw, with Stuart Kettlewell scoring the winner on 2 May. Brora played off against Montrose, the bottom-placed club in Scottish League Two, for a place in League Two for the 2015–16 season. After winning their home leg 1–0, Brora suffered a 3–1 defeat in the away game, thereby losing 3–2 on aggregate to remain in the Highland League.

The prospect of a future promotion to the national leagues has proven controversial due to the distances that players and supporters would be expected to travel to many of the away games. Before the 2014–15 season began, it had been suggested that supporters would be allowed to vote on whether the club should join the Scottish Professional Football League were it to qualify for promotion. However following Brora's successful defence of their Highland League title, chairman John Young said that the club had "looked at all options and there's no way we can avoid competing. We meet SPFL criteria for entry level so we can’t opt out, we’ve got to go for it." Besides the impact on the club, it has been suggested that Brora itself would benefit economically from players and supporters of Southern clubs visiting the town.

The 2019–20 season was curtailed due to the COVID-19 pandemic, and Brora were declared Highland League champions. They were due to progress to the playoffs with the Lowland League winner and the bottom club in League Two, but they were never held.

On 23 March 2021, in the 2020–21 Scottish Cup, Brora upset runaway Championship leaders and the previous season's Scottish Cup finalists, Heart of Midlothian, 2–1 at Dudgeon Park, described as one of Scotland's biggest cup shocks of all time.

For the second consecutive season, Brora were declared champions of the 2020–21 Highland Football League on a points per game formula due to the ongoing COVID-19 pandemic. The decision was announced by the Highland Football League on 30 March 2021.

== Stadium ==
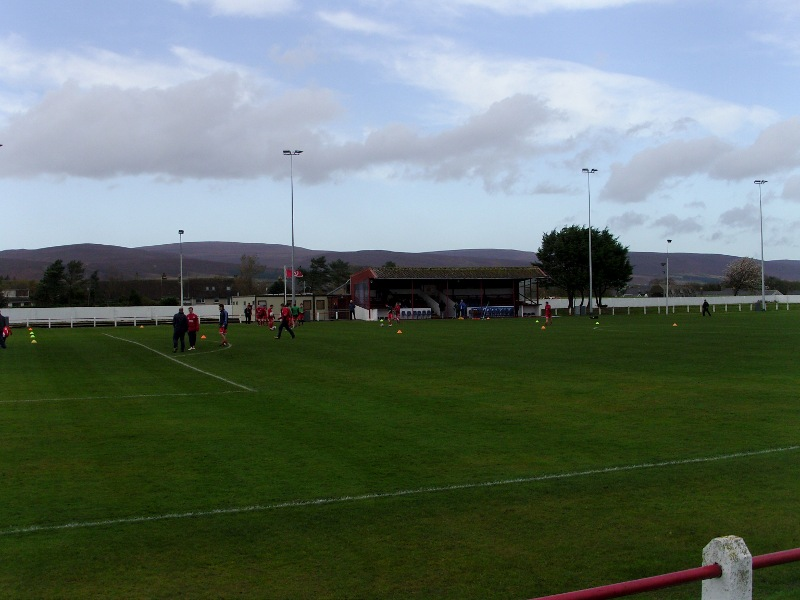
Dudgeon Park

Brora originally played at Inverbrora Park, which is now the site of the Hunters of Brora woollen mills, before moving to Dudgeon Park in 1932. The ground's capacity is 4,000, including 200 seats. The record attendance was set in 2013 when over 2,000 people watched Brora play Rangers in a friendly match.

== Players ==
=== First-team squad ===
As of 16 July 2026

Note: Flags indicate national team as defined under FIFA eligibility rules; some limited exceptions apply. Players may hold more than one non-FIFA nationality.

No.	Pos.	Nation	Player
1	GK	SCO	Cammy Mackay
2	DF	ENG	Ross Draper
3	DF	SCO	Archie Kerr (on-loan from Inverness Caledonian Thistle)
4	DF	SCO	Connall Ewan
5	DF	SCO	Sam Nixon
6	DF	SCO	Alex Cooper
7	MF	SCO	Tony Dingwall
8	MF	SCO	Craig Mackenzie
9	FW	SCO	Jordan MacRae
10	FW	SCO	Shane Sutherland
11	FW	SCO	James Wallace
12	DF	SCO	Tom Kelly

No.	Pos.	Nation	Player
14	DF	SCO	Colin Williamson
15	MF	SCO	Gary Pullen
16	MF	SCO	Alisdair Sutherland
18	FW	SCO	Aidan Wilson (on loan at Nairn County)
19	FW	SCO	Connor Bunce
20	GK	SCO	Daniel Rae
21	MF	SCO	Jake Rodgers (on-loan from Inverness Caledonian Thistle)
25	GK	SCO	Ruardhri Nicol
—	DF	SCO	Wallace Duffy
—	DF	SCO	James Clark (on-loan from Inverness Caledonian Thistle)
—	FW	SCO	Ben Barron
—	FW	SCO	Ben Gardiner

== Management team ==
Position	Name
Manager	Steven Mackay
Assistant Manager	David Hind
First Team Coach	Michael MacKenzie

== Honours ==
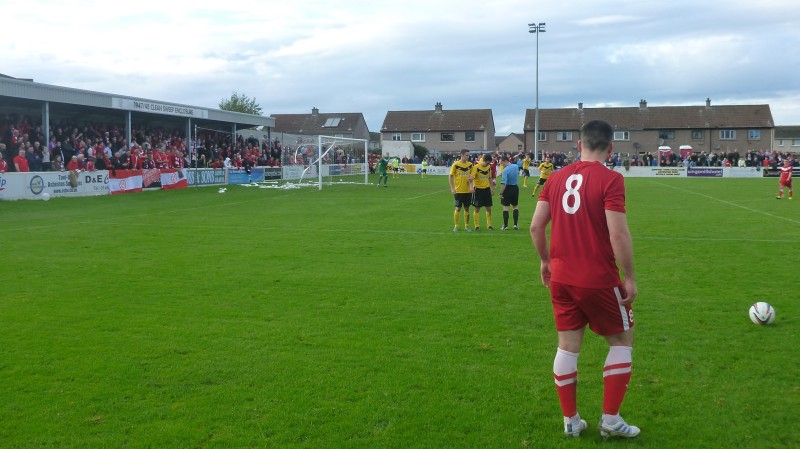
Brora playing Nairn County in the 2013–14 North of Scotland Cup final

- Highland Football League:
  - 2013–14, 2014–15, 2019–20*, 2020–21*, 2024–25, 2025–26
- Highland League Cup:
  - 2015–16, 2021–22, 2023–24, 2024–25
- North of Scotland Cup:
  - 1980–81, 1990–91, 2013–14, 2014–15, 2016–17, 2017–18, 2019–20, 2022–23, 2024–25
- Inverness Cup:
  - 1994–95
- Scottish Qualifying Cup (North):
  - 1979–80

*Awarded following a vote of the league's member clubs. Seasons 2019–20 and 2020–21 were incomplete due to the coronavirus pandemic.
