= 2026–27 Cove Rangers F.C. season =

Cove Rangers season

Cove Rangers
2026–27 season
- Chairman: Keith Moorhouse
- Manager: Paul Hartley
- Stadium: Balmoral Stadium (Capacity: 2,602)
- League One: 9th
- League Cup: Group Stage

The 2026–27 season is Cove Rangers's fourth consecutive season in the third tier of Scottish football, having been relegated from the Scottish Championship at the end of the 2022–23 season.

== Season review ==
On May 7th, Cove Rangers announced their retained list which saw Grady McGrath, Declan Glass, Justin Eguaibor and Mackenzie Strachan all leave the club. Lewis O'Donnell, Adam Emslie, Lewis Carrol, Joseph Teasdale and Cooper Masson all returned to their parent club.

On May 21, Cove announced a new 2-year contract for Balint Demus, and they also announced the signing of Victor Enem.

On May 26th, Cove announced the signing of Max Barry on a 2-year deal for free from Peterhead.

On June 6th, Cove announced that Blair Yule and Mitch Megginson would depart the club, both would end up joining fellow League 1 club Peterhead.

On June 10th, Cove extended the contracts of Ryan Harrington and Reuben McAllister for the 2026/27 season.

On June 19th, Cove extended the contracts of 3 youngsters, Jack Robertson, Mikey Milnes and Cole Donaldson for another season. Later that day Cove would announce that Paul Hartley had agreed a 3 year contract extension with the club.

1 day later on June 20th, Cove announced the signings off Aaron Fraser, Tristan Stephen and Mark Souter.

On June 21st, Cove announced that Arron Darge had agreed a contract extension keeping him at the club for another season and later that day they announced the signing of Destiny Oladipo.

== Squad ==
As of 4 June 2026

No.	Name	Nationality	Position	Apps.	Goals
Goalkeepers
1	Robbie Mutch	(Scotland)	GK	33	0
21	Balint Demus	(Hungary)	GK	50	1
Defenders
2	Layton Bisland	(Scotland)	DF	41	1
3	Victor Enem	(Scotland)	DF	0	0
5	Mark Souter	(Scotland)	DF	0	0
6	Liam Parker	(Scotland)	DF	70	1
7	Ryan Harrington	(Wales)	DF	96	3
15	Arron Darge	(Scotland)	DF	109	3
Midfielders
10	Max Barry	(Scotland)	MF	0	0
11	Reuben McAllister	(Scotland)	MF	34	1
19	Cole Donaldson	(Scotland)	MF	7	0
20	Aaron Fraser	(Scotland)	MF	0	0
25	Mikey Milnes	(Scotland)	MF	4	0
Forwards
9	Destiny Oladipo	(Nigeria)	FW	0	0
12	Chris Maguire	(Scotland)	FW	24	3
16	Edimond Oppong	(Italy)	FW	0	0
17	Tristan Stephen	(Scotland)	FW	0	0
26	Jordan White	(Scotland)	FW	0	0
Loaned out
23	Jack Robertson	(Scotland)	GK	0	0
Players who left during the season

== Transfers ==
=== In ===
Date	Position	Nationality	Name	From	Fee
21 May 2026	DF	(Scotland)	Victor Enem	Unattached	Free
26 May 2026	MF	(Scotland)	Max Barry	Peterhead	Free
20 June 2026	FW	(Scotland)	Tristan Stephen	Aberdeen	Free
20 June 2026	MF	(Scotland)	Aaron Fraser	Aberdeen	Free
20 June 2026	DF	(Scotland)	Mark Souter	Inverurie Loco Works	Free
21 June 2026	FW	(Nigeria)	Destiny Oladipo	East Fife	Free
24 June 2026	FW	(Scotland)	Jordan White	Unattached	Free
12 July 2026	FW	(Italy)	Edimond Oppong	Unattached	Free

== Friendlies ==
27 June 2026	Cove Rangers	0-1	Aberdeen	Aberdeen
14:00			Olusanya 4'	Stadium: Balmoral Stadium

30 June 2026	Cove Rangers	4-1	Inverurie Locos	Aberdeen
19:00	Oladipo 17', 56'; Stephen 78'; White (pen.), 90'		Trialist 29'	Stadium: Balmoral Stadium

2 July 2026	Cove Rangers	1-0	Turriff United	Aberdeen
19:00	Stephen 90'			Stadium: Balmoral Stadium

4 July 2026	Cove Rangers	2-2	Huntly	Aberdeen
13:00	Yeats , 49' (o.g.); McAllister 71'		Trialist 24', 32'	Stadium: Balmoral Stadium

7 July 2026	Cove Rangers	1-4	Inverness Caledonian Thistle	Aberdeen
19:00	Oladipo 22'		Mackay 14'; Duncan 48'; Bates 64'; Kargbo 86'	Stadium: Balmoral Stadium

11 July 2026	Cove Rangers	2-4	St Johnstone	Aberdeen
14:00	Oladipo 33'; Pirie 90'		Paton 16', 69'; Fowler (pen.), 41'; Fotheringham 45'	Stadium: Balmoral Stadium

12 July 2026 Mitch Megginson Testimonial	Cove Rangers Legends	3-6	Aberdeen Legends	Aberdeen
13:30	Fyvie 45'; Brown 74'; Megginson 78'		Considine 31'; McGinn 56', 58'; Mackie 59', 62'; Coutts 83'	Stadium: Balmoral Stadium

== Competitions ==
=== Overview ===
Competition	First match	Last match	Starting round	Final position	Record							
Competition	First match	Last match	Starting round	Final position	Pld	W	D	L	GF	GA	GD	Win %
League One	1 August 2025	1 May 2026	Matchday 1		7	1	2	4	5	9	−4	14.29
Scottish Cup			Third Round		0	0	0	0	0	0	+0	—
League Cup	14 July 2026	25 July 2026	Group Stage	Group Stage	4	1	0	3	3	13	−10	25.00
Challenge Cup	11 August 2026		Group stage		3	2	0	1	10	5	+5	66.67
Total					14	4	2	8	18	27	−9	28.57

Last updated: 9 September 2026

=== League One ===
==== League table ====
Pos	Team	Pld	W	D	L	GF	GA	GD	Pts	Promotion, qualification or relegation
6	East Fife	16	4	6	6	14	19	−5	18	
7	Peterhead	16	5	1	10	13	26	−13	16	
8	Cove Rangers	15	4	3	8	18	23	−5	15	
9	Alloa Athletic	16	3	4	9	17	24	−7	13	Qualification for the League One play-offs
10	Queen of the South	16	4	1	11	15	43	−28	13	Relegation to League Two

Updated to match(es) played on 21 November 2026. Source:
Rules for classification: 1) Points; 2) Goal difference; 3) Goals scored; 4) Head-to head points; 5) Head-to-head goal difference; 6) Play-off (only for deciding promotion, play-off participation and relegation).

==== Results summary ====
Overall								Home						Away					
Pld	W	D	L	GF	GA	GD	Pts	W	D	L	GF	GA	GD	W	D	L	GF	GA	GD
5	1	1	3	3	6	−3	4	1	1	0	3	0	+3	0	0	3	0	6	−6

Last updated: 29 August 2026.
Source: SPFL

1 August 2026 1	Cove Rangers	0–0	Airdrieonians	Aberdeen
15:00	Darge (yellow card) 17'; Barry (yellow card) 90+3'		Mebude (yellow card) 53'; Taylor (yellow card) 85'; Ross (yellow card) 89'	Stadium: Balmoral Stadium; Attendance: 533; Referee: (Scotland) Daniel Graves

8 August 2026 2	East Fife	2-0	Cove Rangers	Methil
15:00	Easton (yellow card) 53'; Dow 80'; Fairley 87'			Stadium: Bayview Stadium; Attendance: 696; Referee: (Scotland) Iain Snedden

15 August 2026 3	East Kilbride	3-0	Cove Rangers	East Kilbride
15:00	Elliott (pen.), 56', (pen.), 67'; Hamilton (yellow card) 70'; Smith 90'		Barry (yellow card) 67'; Mutch (yellow card) 68'; Darge (red card) 87'	Stadium: K-Park; Attendance: 502; Referee: (Scotland) Dan McFarlane

22 August 2026 4	Cove Rangers	3-0	Peterhead	Aberdeen
15:00	Mercer (yellow card) 27'; Teasdale 49'; White 83'; McAllister (yellow card) 86' Oppong 87'		Pawlett (yellow card) 45+3'; Kerr (yellow card) 85'	Stadium: Balmoral Stadium; Attendance: 892; Referee: (Scotland) Peter Stuart

29 August 2026 5	Hamilton Academical	1-0	Cove Rangers	Hamilton
15:00	Ryan 14'; Hendrie (yellow card) 87'; Comrie (yellow card) 90'		White (yellow card) 41'	Stadium: New Douglas Park; Attendance: 812; Referee: (Scotland) Josh Hay

5 September 2026 6	Cove Rangers	1-1	Alloa Athletic	Aberdeen
15:00	Lindo 31', (yellow card) 73'; Bisland (yellow card) 43', (red card) 58'; White (yellow card) 59'		O'Donnell (yellow card) 40'; Foster 74', (yellow card) 76'	Stadium: Balmoral Stadium; Attendance: 232; Referee: (Scotland) Cameron Stirling

12 September 2026 7	Montrose	2-1	Cove Rangers	Montrose
15:00	Lyons 10'; Craig 48'		Oladipo 68'	Stadium: Links Park; Attendance: 673; Referee: (Scotland) Grant Irvine

19 September 2026 8	Cove Rangers	0-2	Ross County	Aberdeen
15:00	Lindo (yellow card) 8'; White (yellow card) 61'		Randall 15'; Lindsay (yellow card) 69'; Diack (yellow card) 87', (goal) 88' (pen.)	Stadium: Balmoral Stadium; Attendance: 586; Referee: (Scotland) Gary Hanvidge

3 October 2026 9	Queen of the South	4-3	Cove Rangers	Dumfries
15:00	Clark 12'; Young 17', 80'; McQueen (yellow card) 44'; Mehmet (yellow card) 75'; Coughlin 77'; Ellis (yellow card) 89'		Oppong (yellow card) 19'; Maguire 55'; Mutch (yellow card) 66'; White 69'; Oladipo 74'; Chalmers (yellow card) 78'	Stadium: Palmerston Park; Attendance: 802; Referee: (Scotland) Lloyd Wilson

10 October 2026 10	Cove Rangers	1-1	East Fife	Aberdeen
15:00	Oladipo 41'; Bisland (yellow card) 43'; Chalmers (yellow card) 76'		Ballantyne (yellow card) 25'; McLeod (yellow card) 37'; Gaffney 69'; Healy (yellow card) 87'	Stadium: Balmoral Stadium; Attendance: 483; Referee: (Scotland) Euan Birch

17 October 2026 11	Peterhead	2-0	Cove Rangers	Peterhead
15:00	Forrest (yellow card) 32'; Smith 52'; Brown (yellow card) 69'; Hepburn (yellow card) 69'; Megginson 78'		Maguire (yellow card) 49'; Barry (red card) 68'; White (yellow card) 69'	Stadium: Balmoor Stadium; Attendance: 625; Referee: (Scotland) Iain Snedden

24 October 2026 12	Cove Rangers	v	East Kilbride	Aberdeen
15:00				Stadium: Balmoral Stadium

31 October 2026 13	Airdrieonians	0-1	Cove Rangers	Airdrie
15:00	Smith (yellow card) 24'		Francis-Burrell (yellow card) 34'; White (yellow card) 44'; Oladipo 56'	Stadium: Excelsior Stadium; Attendance: 1,261; Referee: (Scotland) Ryan Birrell

7 November 2026 14	Cove Rangers	4-0	Hamilton Academical	Aberdeen
15:00	Oppong 31', 60', 78'; Darge (yellow card) 71'; Teasdale 84'		McKinstry (yellow card) 40'; Blues (yellow card) 84'	Stadium: Balmoral Stadium; Attendance: 280; Referee: (Scotland) Daniel Graves

14 November 2026 15	Cove Rangers	3-0	Montrose	Aberdeen
15:00	Darge (yellow card) 37'; White (pen.), 52', 68'; Keir 61'; Mercer (yellow card) 76'; Maguire (yellow card) 86'			Stadium: Balmoral Stadium; Attendance: 616; Referee: (Scotland) Josh Hay

21 November 2026 16	Ross County	5-1	Cove Rangers	Dingwall
15:00	Emslie 5', 90+1'; Diack 73'; Chin 83'; Docherty 89'		Chalmers (yellow card) 23'; Keir 52'; Maguire (yellow card) 78'	Stadium: Victoria Park; Referee: (Scotland) George Calder

5 December 2026 17	Alloa Athletic	v	Cove Rangers	Alloa
15:00				Stadium: Recreation Park

12 December 2026 18	Cove Rangers	v	Queen of the South	Aberdeen
15:00				Stadium: Balmoral Stadium

19 December 2026 19	East Fife	v	Cove Rangers	Aberdeen
15:00				Stadium: Balmoral Stadium

26 December 2026 20	Cove Rangers	v	Peterhead	Aberdeen
15:00				Stadium: Balmoral Stadium

2 January 2027 21	Montrose	v	Cove Rangers	Montrose
15:00				Stadium: Links Park

9 January 2027 22	Cove Rangers	v	Airdrieonians	Aberdeen
15:00				Stadium: Balmoral Stadium

23 January 2027 23	East Kilbride	v	Cove Rangers	East Kilbride
15:00				Stadium: K-Park

30 January 2026 24	Cove Rangers	v	Ross County	Aberdeen
15:00				Stadium: Balmoral Stadium

13 February 2027 25	Queen of the South	v	Cove Rangers	Dumfries
15:00				Stadium: Palmerston Park

20 January 2027 26	Hamilton Academical	v	Cove Rangers	Hamilton
15:00				Stadium: New Douglas Park

27 February 2027 27	Cove Rangers	v	Alloa Athletic	Aberdeen
15:00				Stadium: Balmoral Stadium

6 March 2027 28	Cove Rangers	v	East Fife	Aberdeen
15:00				Stadium: Balmoral Stadium

13 March 2027 29	Airdrieonians	v	Cove Rangers	Airdrie
15:00				Stadium: Excelsior Stadium

20 March 2027 30	Peterhead	v	Cove Rangers	Peterhead
15:00				Stadium: Balmoor Stadium

27 March 2027 31	Cove Rangers	v	Montrose	Aberdeen
15:00				Stadium: Balmoral Stadium

3 April 2026 32	Cove Rangers	v	Queen of the South	Aberdeen
15:00				Stadium: Balmoral Stadium

10 April 2027 33	Ross County	v	Cove Rangers	Dingwall
15:00				Stadium: Victoria Park

17 April 2027 34	Cove Rangers	v	Hamilton Academical	Aberdeen
15:00				Stadium: Balmoral Stadium

24 April 2027 35	Alloa Athletic	v	Cove Rangers	Alloa
15:00				Stadium: Recreation Park

1 May 2027 36	Cove Rangers	v	East Kilbride	Aberdeen
15:00				Stadium: Balmoral Stadium

=== Scottish Cup ===
28 November 2026 Third round	Inverness Caledonian Thistle	v	Cove Rangers	Inverness
15:00				Stadium: Caledonian Stadium

=== League Cup ===
==== Group stage ====
Pos	Team	Pld	W	PW	PL	L	GF	GA	GD	Pts	Qualification	STM	DNF	EKB	DUM	COV
1	St Mirren	4	3	0	0	1	12	4	+8	9	Qualification for the second round	—	0–1	4–3	—	—
2	Dunfermline Athletic	4	3	0	0	1	10	4	+6	9	Qualification for the second round	—	—	—	4–1	5–0
3	East Kilbride	4	2	0	0	2	13	10	+3	6		—	3–0	—	5–3	—
4	Dumbarton	4	1	0	0	3	6	13	−7	3		0–4	—	—	—	2–0
5	Cove Rangers	4	1	0	0	3	3	13	−10	3		0–4	—	3–2	—	—

Rules for classification: 1) goal difference, 2) goals scored, 3) away goals scored, 4) matches won, 5) away matches won, 6) drawing of lots.

14 July 2026 1	Cove Rangers	3–2	East Kilbride	Aberdeen
19:45	Oladipo 53'; McAllister 56', (yellow card) 90+1'; Barry 84'		Foster 48'; Harrington , 72' (o.g.); O'Connor (yellow card) 80'	Stadium: Balmoral Stadium; Referee: (Scotland) Joel Kennedy

18 July 2026 2	Cove Rangers	0–4	St Mirren	Aberdeen
15:00			Idowu (pen.), 31'; Ramos 42'; Fieldson (yellow card) 67'; Douglas 81'; Calvin 85'	Stadium: Balmoral Stadium; Attendance: 722; Referee: (Scotland) Dan McFarlane

21 July 2026 3	Dunfermline Athletic	5–0	Cove Rangers	Dunfermline
19:45	Tod 5', 68'; Shaw 15', 33'; Amade (yellow card) 49'; Cooper 81'		Souter (yellow card) 62'	Stadium: East End Park; Attendance: 1,854; Referee: (Scotland) Alan Hendry

25 July 2026 4	Dumbarton	2–0	Cove Rangers	Coatbridge
15:00	McIntosh 5'; Lang 64'		Souter (yellow card) 84'	Stadium: Cliftonhill Stadium

=== Scottish Challenge Cup ===
==== Group stage ====
Pos	Team	Pld	W	D	L	GF	GA	GD	Pts	Qualification
2	Ross County	6	5	0	1	30	7	+23	15	Advance to Second round (seeded)
3	Airdrieonians	6	5	0	1	21	8	+13	15	Advance to Second round (seeded)
4	Cove Rangers	6	5	0	1	19	7	+12	15	Advance to Second round (seeded)
5	Peterhead	6	5	0	1	12	4	+8	15	Advance to Second round (seeded)
6	East Kilbride	6	4	1	1	19	13	+6	13	Advance to Second round (seeded)

Source: SPFL
Rules for classification: 1) Points; 2) Goal difference; 3) Goals scored; 4) Highest number of wins; 5) Lower disciplinary points; 6) Drawing of lots.

11 August 2026 1	Stirling Albion	4-2	Cove Rangers	Stirling
19:45	Raine 36'; McLean (pen.), 40', 52'; Crane 45'; Hutchinson (yellow card) 60'		Parker (yellow card) 27'; McAllister (yellow card) 39'; Oladipo 49', 71'; Souter (yellow card) 88'	Stadium: Forthbank Stadium; Attendance: 315; Referee: (Scotland) Greg Soutar

25 August 2026 2	Cove Rangers	2-0	Dundee United B	Aberdeen
19:45	White (pen.), 52'; Stephen 78'		McHale (yellow card) 39'; Buchanan (yellow card) 45+2'	Stadium: Balmoral Stadium; Attendance: 148; Referee: (Scotland) Mark Daly

8 September 2026 3	Cove Rangers	6-1	Dumbarton	Aberdeen
19:45	Lindo (yellow card) 22'; White 25', 53'; Oladipo 39'; Darge 57'; Parker 73'; Harrington 90+1'		Campbell 24'	Stadium: Balmoral Stadium; Attendance: 103; Referee: (Scotland) Greg Soutar

22 September 2026 4	Fraserburgh	0-5	Cove Rangers	Fraserburgh
19:45	Hay (yellow card) 57'		Oppong 5'; Mahoney , 33' (o.g.); Darge (yellow card) 38'; White 57' (pen.); Oladipo 64'; Barry 90+1'	Stadium: Bellslea Park; Attendance: 253; Referee: (Scotland) Joel Kennedy

26 September 2026 5	Cove Rangers	2-1	Aberdeen B	Aberdeen
15:00	Francis-Burrell (yellow card) 27'; Oppong (yellow card) 33'; White 50' (pen.); Chalmers 85'		Teasdale 43' , (yellow card) 84'	Stadium: Balmoral Stadium; Attendance: 329; Referee: (Scotland) Abbie Hendry

13 October 2026 6	Cove Rangers	2-1	Formartine United	Aberdeen
19:45	Keir 9'; Parker (yellow card) 13'; Francis-Burrell 28'; Chalmers (yellow card) 72'		McAllister 50', (yellow card) 71'; Murray (yellow card) 56'	Stadium: Balmoral Stadium; Attendance: 202; Referee: (Scotland) Kieran O'Reilly

3 November 2026 Second round	Formartine United	0-2	Cove Rangers	Pitmedden
19:45	McAllister (yellow card) 49'; Scully (yellow card) 74'		Oppong 2'; Oladipo 52'; Barry (yellow card) 56'; Lindo (yellow card) 60'; Parker (yellow card) 64'	Stadium: North Lodge Park; Attendance: 175; Referee: (Scotland) Joel Kennedy

== Squad statistics ==
=== Appearances ===
As of 21 November 2026

No.	Pos	Nat	Player	Total		League One		Scottish Cup		League Cup		Challenge Cup	
No.	Pos	Nat	Player	Apps	Goals	Apps	Goals	Apps	Goals	Apps	Goals	Apps	Goals
1	GK	(Scotland) SCO	Robbie Mutch	17	0	15	0	0	0	2	0	0	0
21	GK	(Hungary) HUN	Balint Demus	9	0	0	0	0	0	2	0	7	0
2	DF	(Scotland) SCO	Layton Bisland	21	0	12	0	0	0	2	0	7	0
3	DF	(Scotland) SCO	Dylan Ross	12	0	9	0	0	0	3	0	0	0
4	DF	(England) ENG	Afonso Lindo	11	1	6	1	0	0	0	0	5	0
5	DF	(Scotland) SCO	Mark Souter	12	0	6	0	0	0	4	0	2	0
6	DF	(Scotland) SCO	Jamie Mercer	10	0	10	0	0	0	0	0	0	0
7	DF	(Wales) WAL	Ryan Harrington	26	1	15	0	0	0	4	0	7	1
15	DF	(Scotland) SCO	Arron Darge	23	1	13	0	0	0	3	0	7	1
22	DF	(Nigeria) NGR	Victor Enem	5	0	1	0	0	0	4	0	0	0
32	DF	(Scotland) SCO	Liam Parker	19	1	8	0	0	0	4	0	7	1
8	MF	(England) ENG	Ackeme Francis-Burrell	14	1	5	0	0	0	3	0	6	1
10	MF	(Scotland) SCO	Max Barry	23	2	13	0	0	0	3	1	7	1
11	MF	(Scotland) SCO	Reuben McAllister	10	1	4	0	0	0	4	1	2	0
14	MF	(Scotland) SCO	Joe Chalmers	18	1	12	0	0	0	0	0	6	1
20	MF	(Scotland) SCO	Aaron Fraser	2	0	0	0	0	0	0	0	2	0
25	MF	(Scotland) SCO	Mikey Milnes	4	0	3	0	0	0	0	0	1	0
9	FW	(Nigeria) NGR	Destiny Oladipo	26	10	15	4	0	0	4	1	7	5
12	FW	(Scotland) SCO	Miller Keir	10	3	6	2	0	0	0	0	4	1
16	FW	(Scotland) SCO	Joseph Teasdale	18	1	14	1	0	0	4	0	0	0
17	FW	(Scotland) SCO	Tristan Stephen	7	1	2	0	0	0	2	0	3	1
18	FW	(Italy) ITA	Edimond Oppong	25	6	14	4	0	0	4	0	7	2
26	FW	(Scotland) SCO	Jordan White	26	9	15	4	0	0	4	0	7	5
77	FW	(Scotland) SCO	Chris Maguire	24	1	14	1	0	0	4	0	6	0
Loaned out:
19	MF	(Scotland) SCO	Cole Donaldson	0	0	0	0	0	0	0	0	0	0
23	GK	(Scotland) SCO	Jack Robertson	0	0	0	0	0	0	0	0	0	0
Players who left Cove during the season:

=== Goal scorers ===
As of 15 July 2026

Rank	Position	Nation	Squad number	Name	League One	Scottish Cup	League Cup	Challenge Cup	Total
1	FW	(Nigeria)	9	Destiny Oladipo	4	0	1	5	10
2	FW	(Scotland)	26	Jordan White	4	0	0	5	9
3	FW	(Italy)	18	Edimond Oppong	4	0	0	0	4
4	FW	(Scotland)	16	Joseph Teasdale	2	0	0	0	2
4	FW	(Scotland)	12	Miller Keir	0	0	0	2	2
6	MF	(Scotland)	11	Reuben McAllister	0	0	1	0	1
6	MF	(Scotland)	10	Max Barry	0	0	1	0	1
6	FW	(Scotland)	17	Tristan Stephen	0	0	0	1	1
6	DF	(England)	4	Afonso Lindo	1	0	0	0	1
6	DF	(Scotland)	15	Arron Darge	0	0	0	1	1
6	DF	(Scotland)	32	Liam Parker	0	0	0	1	1
6	DF	(Wales)	7	Ryan Harrington	0	0	0	1	1
TOTALS					7	0	3	12	22
