= 2026–27 Raith Rovers F.C. season =

Raith Rovers
2026–27 season
- Chairman: John Sim (interim)
- Manager: Dougie Imrie
- Stadium: Stark's Park
- Championship: 5th (ongoing)
- League Cup: Group Stage
- Challenge Cup: 2nd Round
- Top goalscorer: League: George Oakley (5 goals); All: George Oakley (5 goals)
- Highest home attendance: 6,756
- Lowest home attendance: 935
- Average home league attendance: 3,524

The 2026–27 season will be Raith Rovers' seventh season back in the second tier of Scottish football after being promoted from Scottish League One at the end of the 2019–20 season. Raith Rovers will also compete in the League Cup, Challenge Cup and the Scottish Cup.

== Summary ==
=== Management ===
Raith will be led by manager Dougie Imrie.

== Results & fixtures ==
Win Draw Loss Postponed

=== Friendlies ===
27 June 2026 Friendly	Raith Rovers	2–2	Hamilton Academical	Stark's Park
13:00	Vaughan 73', 80'	Raith Report	Thomas 6'; Orsi 26'	Referee: Iain Snedden

30 June 2026 Friendly	Raith Rovers	4–0	Edinburgh City	Stark's Park
19:30	Turner 8'; Montagu 69'; Vaughan 78'; McMullan 88'	Raith Report		Referee: Cameron Stirling

24 July 2026 Friendly	Raith Rovers	0–1	Heart of Midlothian	Stark's Park
19:30		Raith Report	Mato 87'	Referee: David Dickinson

=== Scottish Championship ===
1 August 2026 1	Raith Rovers	1–1	Stenhousemuir	Stark's Park
15:00	McMullan 19'	Raith Report	Hodgkiss 30'	Attendance: 2,239; Referee: Calum Scott

8 August 2026 2	Queen's Park	1–2	Raith Rovers	Lesser Hampden
15:00	McLean 77'	Raith Report	Telfer 39'; Dowds 58' (pen.)	Attendance: 866; Referee: Jamie Wilkie

22 August 2026 3	Raith Rovers	2–0	Ayr United	Stark's Park
15:00	Dowds 8', 15'	Raith Report		Attendance: 3,249; Referee: Lloyd Wilson

28 August 2026 4	Dunfermline Athletic	1–0	Raith Rovers	East End Park
19:30	Cooper 88'	Raith Report		Attendance: 7,281; Referee: Duncan Nicolson

5 September 2026 5	Inverness Caledonian Thistle	0–2	Raith Rovers	Caledonian Stadium
15:00		Raith Report	Robertson 11'; Rowe 85'	Attendance: 2,776; Referee: Lewis Hogarth

12 September 2026 6	Raith Rovers	4–0	Arbroath	Stark's Park
15:00	Oakley 8', 15'; Rowe 27'; Easton 63' (pen.)	Raith Report		Attendance: 3,036; Referee: Dan McFarlane

19 September 2026 7	Partick Thistle	0–0	Raith Rovers	Firhill Stadium
15:00		Raith Report		Attendance: 4,514; Referee: Cameron Stirling

25 September 2026 8	Raith Rovers	0–2	Livingston	Stark's Park
19:45		Raith Report	Muirhead 46', 59'	Attendance: 3,373; Referee: Duncan Nicolson

3 October 2026 9	Greenock Morton	1–2	Raith Rovers	Cappielow
15:00	Garrity 53'	Raith Report	Rowe 16'; Oakley 67'	Attendance: 1,653; Referee: Sean Murdoch

10 October 2026 10	Raith Rovers	2–0	Queen's Park	Stark's Park
15:00	Brown 31'; Turner 66' (pen.)	Raith Report		Attendance: 2,969; Referee: Ross Hardie

17 October 2026 11	Stenhousemuir	1–1	Raith Rovers	Ochilview Park
15:00	Anderson 20'	Raith Report	Rowe 46'	Attendance: 1,528; Referee: Lewis Hogarth

24 October 2026 12	Raith Rovers	0–2	Inverness Caledonian Thistle	Stark's Park
15:00		Raith Report	A.Stewart 14', 37'	Attendance: 2,909; Referee: Cameron Stirling

31 October 2026 13	Arbroath	0–4	Raith Rovers	Gayfield Park
15:00		Raith Report	Oakley 1', 34', 78'; Tiffoney 3'	Attendance: 1,501; Referee: Grant Irvine

6 November 2026 14	Raith Rovers	0–0	Dunfermline Athletic	Stark's Park
19:30		Raith Report		Attendance: 6,756; Referee: Calum Scott

14 November 2026 15	Ayr United	3–1	Raith Rovers	Somerset Park
15:00	Shanks 22', 63' (pen.); Rus 29'	Raith Report	Dowds 54'	Attendance: 1,837; Referee: Cameron Stirling

21 November 2026 16	Raith Rovers	0–2	Partick Thistle	Stark's Park
15:00		Raith Report	Loughrey 60'; Henderson 76'	Attendance: 3,661; Referee: Colin Steven

4 December 2026 17	Livingston	v	Raith Rovers	Almondvale Stadium
19:30

=== Scottish League Cup ===
11 July 2026 Group H	Raith Rovers	3–1	Elgin City	Stark's Park
15:00	Neill 28' (o.g.); Montagu 42'; Millen 73'	Raith Report	Colloty 62'	Attendance: 1,276; Referee: Dan McFarlane

14 July 2026 Group H	Kilmarnock	0–0 (4–2 p)	Raith Rovers	Beechwood Park
19:45		Raith Report		Attendance: 1,441; Referee: David Dickinson
	Penalties
	Hugill (penalty missed); Thomson (penalty scored); Ring (penalty scored); Owen (penalty scored); Mathurin (penalty scored)		Vaughan (penalty scored); Telfer (penalty missed); Turner (penalty missed); Millen (penalty scored)

18 July 2026 Group H	Hamilton Academical	1–1 (5–4 p)	Raith Rovers	New Douglas Park
15:00	Blues 32'	Raith Report	Vaughan 26' (pen.)	Attendance: 1,100; Referee: Chris Graham
	Penalties
	Hendrie (penalty scored); Thomas (penalty scored); Trialist (penalty scored); MacDonald (penalty scored); Bannigan (penalty scored)		Vaughan (penalty scored); McMullan (penalty scored); Robertson (penalty scored); Millen (penalty scored); Gibson (penalty missed)

21 July 2026 Group H	Raith Rovers	1–0	Peterhead	Stark's Park
19:45	Easton 38'	Raith Report		Attendance: 935; Referee: Lewis Hogarth

=== Scottish Challenge Cup ===
3 November 2026 Round 2	Hamilton Academical	1–1 (5–4 p)	Raith Rovers	New Douglas Park
19:45	Shiels 12'	Raith Report	Tiffoney 45'	Attendance: 360; Referee: Sean Murdoch
	Penalties
	Morgan (penalty scored); Bannigan (penalty scored); Crawford (penalty scored); Ryan (penalty scored); Lyon (penalty scored)		Dowds (penalty scored); Adamson (penalty scored); Tiffoney (penalty missed); Millen (penalty scored)

=== Scottish Cup ===
28 November 2026 Round 3	Troon	v	Raith Rovers	Portland Park
15:00

== Player statistics ==
=== Squad ===
Last updated 21 November 2026

No.	Pos	Nat	Player	Total		Championship		League Cup		Scottish Cup		Challenge Cup	
No.	Pos	Nat	Player	Apps	Goals	Apps	Goals	Apps	Goals	Apps	Goals	Apps	Goals
1	GK	(Scotland) SCO	Josh Rae	19	0	16+0	0	3+0	0	0+0	0	0+0	0
2	DF	(England) ENG	Jai Rowe	18	4	12+1	4	2+2	0	0+0	0	1+0	0
3	DF	(Republic of Ireland) IRL	Zak Delaney	16	0	11+1	0	4+0	0	0+0	0	0+0	0
4	DF	(Scotland) SCO	Paul Hanlon	17	0	15+1	0	0+0	0	0+0	0	1+0	0
5	DF	(Scotland) SCO	Callum Fordyce	11	0	3+3	0	4+0	0	0+0	0	1+0	0
6	DF	(Scotland) SCO	Jack Baird	13	0	12+1	0	0+0	0	0+0	0	0+0	0
7	MF	(Scotland) SCO	Arron Lyall	14	0	7+2	0	1+3	0	0+0	0	1+0	0
8	MF	(Scotland) SCO	Kyle Turner	17	1	7+5	1	2+2	0	0+0	0	1+0	0
9	FW	(England) ENG	George Oakley	10	6	8+1	6	1+0	0	0+0	0	0+0	0
10	FW	(Scotland) SCO	Lewis Vaughan	7	1	0+3	0	4+0	1	0+0	0	0+0	0
11	FW	(Scotland) SCO	John Robertson	13	1	9+0	1	4+0	0	0+0	0	0+0	0
13	GK	(Wales) WAL	Luke Armstrong	2	0	0+0	0	1+0	0	0+0	0	1+0	0
14	MF	(Scotland) SCO	Calum Adamson	10	0	8+1	0	0+0	0	0+0	0	0+1	0
15	FW	(Scotland) SCO	Scott Tiffoney	13	2	10+2	1	0+0	0	0+0	0	1+0	1
16	DF	(Scotland) SCO	Lewis Stevenson	16	0	6+6	0	2+1	0	0+0	0	1+0	0
18	FW	(Scotland) SCO	Paul McMullan	19	1	13+1	1	0+4	0	0+0	0	1+0	0
19	FW	(Scotland) SCO	Anton Dowds	11	4	7+2	4	1+0	0	0+0	0	1+0	0
20	MF	(Scotland) SCO	Scott Brown	15	1	9+5	1	0+0	0	0+0	0	1+0	0
21	MF	(Scotland) SCO	Charlie Telfer	10	1	3+3	1	3+1	0	0+0	0	0+0	0
22	DF	(Scotland) SCO	Ross Millen	12	1	5+2	0	4+0	1	0+0	0	0+1	0
23	MF	(Scotland) SCO	Dylan Easton	11	2	1+6	1	4+0	1	0+0	0	0+0	0
25	MF	(Scotland) SCO	Kai Montagu	20	1	12+3	0	4+0	1	0+0	0	0+1	0
Players who left during the season who made an appearance
17	FW	(Scotland) SCO	Lewis Gibson	4	0	0+1	0	0+3	0	0+0	0	0+0	0

=== Disciplinary record ===
Includes all competitive matches.

Last updated November 2026

Number	Position	Nation	Name	Championship		League Cup		Scottish Cup		Challenge Cup		Total	
Number	Position	Nation	Name	Yellow card	Red card	Yellow card	Red card	Yellow card	Red card	Yellow card	Red card	Yellow card	Red card
1	GK	(Scotland)	Josh Rae	0	0	0	0	0	0	0	0	0	0
2	DF	(England)	Jai Rowe	2	0	1	0	0	0	0	0	3	0
3	DF	(Republic of Ireland)	Zak Delaney	2	0	0	0	0	0	0	0	2	0
4	DF	(Scotland)	Paul Hanlon	1	0	0	0	0	0	0	0	1	0
5	DF	(Scotland)	Callum Fordyce	1	0	0	0	0	0	0	0	1	0
6	DF	(Scotland)	Jack Baird	2	0	0	0	0	0	0	0	2	0
7	MF	(Scotland)	Arron Lyall	1	0	0	0	0	0	0	0	1	0
8	MF	(Scotland)	Kyle Turner	3	0	0	0	0	0	0	0	3	0
9	FW	(England)	George Oakley	2	0	0	0	0	0	0	0	2	0
10	FW	(Scotland)	Lewis Vaughan	0	0	1	0	0	0	0	0	1	0
11	FW	(Scotland)	John Robertson	0	0	1	0	0	0	0	0	1	0
13	GK	(Wales)	Luke Armstrong	0	0	0	0	0	0	0	0	0	0
14	MF	(Scotland)	Calum Adamson	1	1	0	0	0	0	0	0	1	1
15	FW	(Scotland)	Scott Tiffoney	1	0	0	0	0	0	0	0	1	0
16	DF	(Scotland)	Lewis Stevenson	2	0	0	0	0	0	0	0	2	0
18	FW	(Scotland)	Paul McMullan	2	0	0	0	0	0	0	0	2	0
19	FW	(Scotland)	Anton Dowds	2	0	0	0	0	0	0	0	2	0
20	MF	(Scotland)	Scott Brown	3	0	0	0	0	0	0	0	3	0
21	MF	(Scotland)	Charlie Telfer	3	0	0	0	0	0	0	0	3	0
22	DF	(Scotland)	Ross Millen	0	0	0	0	0	0	0	0	0	0
23	MF	(Scotland)	Dylan Easton	0	0	0	0	0	0	0	0	0	0
25	MF	(Scotland)	Kai Montagu	2	0	0	0	0	0	0	0	2	0
Players who left during the season
17	FW	(Scotland)	Lewis Gibson	0	0	0	0	0	0	0	0	0	0

== Team statistics ==
=== League table ===
Pos	Team	Pld	W	D	L	GF	GA	GD	Pts	Promotion, qualification or relegation
1	Partick Thistle	15	9	4	2	21	9	+12	31	Promotion to the Premiership
2	Stenhousemuir	15	8	2	5	18	16	+2	26	Qualification for the Premiership play-off semi-final
3	Raith Rovers	15	7	4	4	21	12	+9	25	Qualification for the Premiership play-off quarter-final
4	Dunfermline Athletic	14	6	7	1	15	7	+8	25	Qualification for the Premiership play-off quarter-final
5	Livingston	15	7	3	5	21	12	+9	24	

Updated to match(es) played on 20 November 2026. Source:
Rules for classification: 1) Points; 2) Goal difference; 3) Goals scored; 4) Head-to head points; 5) Head-to-head goal difference; 6) Play-off (only for deciding promotion, play-off participation and relegation).

=== League Cup table ===
Pos	Team	Pld	W	PW	PL	L	GF	GA	GD	Pts	Qualification	KIL	HAM	RAI	PET	ELG
1	Kilmarnock	4	2	1	1	0	2	0	+2	9	Qualification for the second round	—	1–0	p0–0	—	—
2	Hamilton Academical	4	2	1	0	1	7	2	+5	8		—	—	p1–1	—	5–0
3	Raith Rovers	4	2	0	2	0	5	2	+3	8		—	—	—	1–0	3–1
4	Peterhead	4	1	1	0	2	3	3	0	5		p0–0	0–1	—	—	—
5	Elgin City	4	0	0	0	4	2	12	−10	0		0–1	—	—	1–3	—

Rules for classification: 1) goal difference, 2) goals scored, 3) away goals scored, 4) matches won, 5) away matches won, 6) drawing of lots.

=== Management statistics ===
Last updated on 21 November 2026

Name	From	To	P	W	D	L	Win% (Note: Win% is the percentage of matches won rounded to two decimal places.)
Dougie Imrie	25 November 2025		21	9	4	8	42.86

== Transfers ==
=== Players in ===
Player	From	Fee
(England) George Oakley	(Scotland) Greenock Morton	Free
(Scotland) John Robertson	(Scotland) East Kilbride	Free
(Scotland) Kyle Turner	(Scotland) Partick Thistle	Free
(Scotland) Ross Millen	(Scotland) Inverness CT	Free
(Scotland) Charlie Telfer	(Scotland) Airdrieonians	Free
(Scotland) Arron Lyall	(Scotland) Ross County	Free
(Scotland) Anton Dowds	(Scotland) Ayr United	Free
(Scotland) Calum Adamson	(Scotland) Rangers	Loan
(Scotland) Scott Tiffoney	(Scotland) Kilmarnock	Loan
(Scotland) Jack Baird	(Scotland) St Johnstone	Undisclosed Fee

=== Players out ===
Player	To	Fee
(Scotland) Ross Matthews	(Australia) Bentleigh Greens	Free
(Scotland) Jack Hamilton	(Scotland) Queen's Park	Free
(Scotland) Josh Mullin	(Scotland) Stirling Albion	Free
(Scotland) Shaun Byrne	(Scotland) Montrose	Free
(Scotland) Aidan Glavin	(Northern Ireland) Linfield	Free
(Scotland) Callum Hannah	(Scotland) Kelty Hearts	Free
(Scotland) Logan Raeside	(Scotland) Civil Service Strollers	Free
(Malaysia) Richard Chin	(Scotland) Ross County	Undisclosed Fee
(Scotland) Lewis Gibson	(Scotland) Airdrieonians	Free
