= Scott Tiffoney =

Scottish footballer (born 1998)

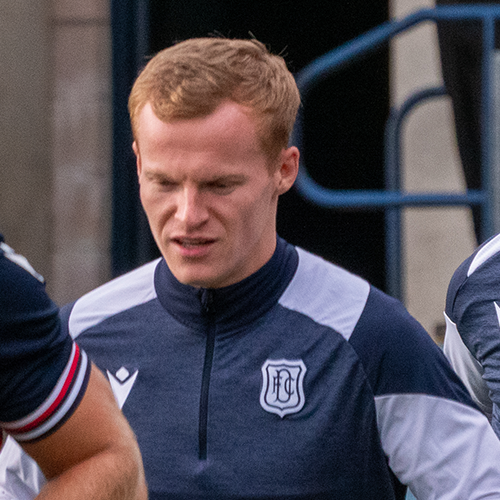
- Tiffoney in 2024

Personal information
- Date of birth: 26 August 1998 (age 28)
- Place of birth: Glasgow, Scotland
- Height: 1.76 m (5 ft 9 in)
- Position: Winger

Team information
- Current team: Raith Rovers (on loan from Kilmarnock)
- Number: 15

Youth career
- St Mirren
- Greenock Morton

Senior career*
Years	Team	Apps	(Gls)
2016–2018	Greenock Morton	39	(3)
2016–2017	→ Clyde (loan)	6	(0)
2018–2021	Livingston	28	(3)
2018–2019	→ Greenock Morton (loan)	11	(3)
2020	→ Ayr United (loan)	6	(0)
2021	→ Partick Thistle (loan)	11	(8)
2021–2023	Partick Thistle	54	(13)
2023–2025	Dundee	63	(9)
2025–	Kilmarnock	12	(1)
2026–	→ Raith Rovers (loan)	11	(1)
- * Club domestic league appearances and goals as of 16:46, 13 November 2026 (UTC)

Scott Tiffoney (born 26 August 1998) is a Scottish professional footballer who plays as a winger for Scottish Championship club Raith Rovers, on loan from Scottish Premiership club Kilmarnock. Tiffoney started his career in the youth system at St Mirren, and has played for Greenock Morton, Livingston, Partick Thistle and Dundee, as well as numerous loan spells.

== Career ==
=== Morton ===
Tiffoney signed a new deal in September 2016 to tie him to Morton until summer 2018.

On 10 November 2016, he joined Scottish League Two side Clyde on loan until January 2017. He returned to Morton after just six appearances for the Bully Wee.

=== Livingston ===
In August 2018, Tiffoney signed for Livingston for an undisclosed fee and was immediately loaned back to Morton until January 2019. He made his second debut for Morton on the left-wing in a defeat against Dumbarton. He joined Ayr United on loan in January 2020.

==== Partick Thistle (loan) ====
Tiffoney joined Partick Thistle on loan in March 2021, during the extended loan market for the 2020–21 Scottish League One season as a result of the temporary suspension on lower league football due to the COVID-19 pandemic. Tiffoney scored his first and second goals for the club on his league debut, in a 4–2 away win at Airdrieonians on 27 March 2021. Tiffoney would play a massive part in Thistle's league comeback and eventually League One title win.

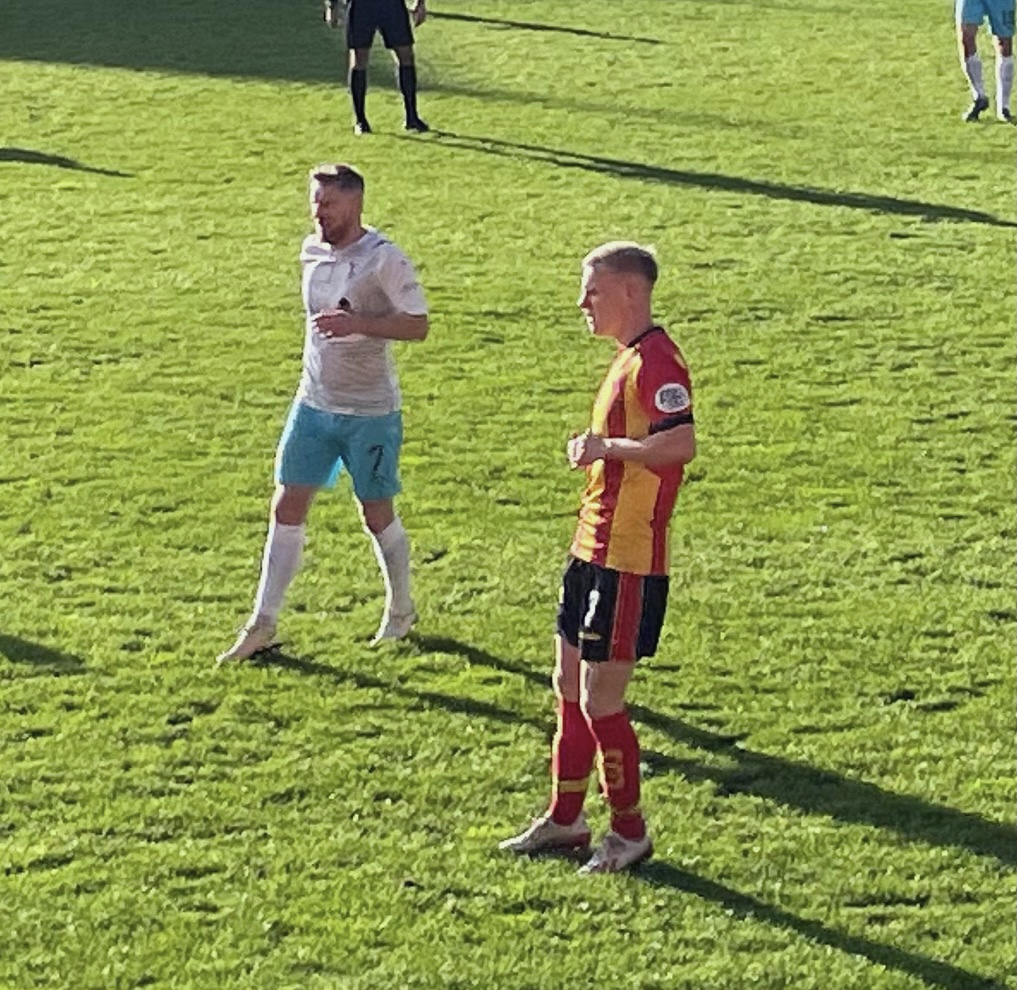
Tiffoney (right) playing for Partick Thistle

=== Partick Thistle ===
After a successful loan spell at the club, Tiffoney joined Partick Thistle on a two-year contract in June 2021 ahead of the upcoming 2021–22 Scottish Championship season after Partick Thistle's title-winning Scottish League One campaign in 2020–21. Tiffoney scored the winner on the opening day of the 2021–22 league season in a 3–2 home win over Queen of The South.

During his first full season with Thistle; Tiffoney scored five goals and registered seven assists in all competitions, as Partick Thistle finished 4th in the Scottish Championship.

Tiffoney suffered injury problems during spells of his second full season with Thistle, however, managed to register 12 goals and eight assists in all competitions during the 2022–23 campaign. As Thistle once again finished 4th in the Championship, Tiffoney scored 3 goals in the side's impressive run to the Premiership play-off final, where they would fall at the final hurdle against Ross County.

=== Dundee ===
In June 2023, Tiffoney agreed to join Scottish Premiership club Dundee following the expiration of his contract at Partick Thistle. He would make his competitive debut in an away Scottish League Cup group stage win against Bonnyrigg Rose. Tiffoney scored his first Dundee goal in the league away to St Johnstone in September 2023. On 17 February 2024, Tiffoney scored both goals in a 2–0 victory at home to Ross County.

On 16 March 2025, Tiffoney started and scored in an away victory against Dundee United, in Dundee's first away win in the Dundee derby in over twenty years. On 17 June 2025, Dundee announced that Tiffoney had departed the club.

=== Kilmarnock ===
On 18 June 2025, Tiffoney joined fellow Scottish Premiership club Kilmarnock on a two-year deal.

==== Raith Rovers (loan) ====
On 21 August 2026, Tiffoney joined Scottish Championship side Raith Rovers on loan until the end of the 2026–27 season. He made his debut the next day off the bench in a league win over Ayr United.

== Personal life ==
His elder brother Jonathan Tiffoney is also a footballer.

== Career statistics ==
As of match played 5 September 2026

Appearances and goals by club, season and competition
Club	Season	League			Scottish Cup		League Cup		Other		Total	
Club	Season	Division	Apps	Goals	Apps	Goals	Apps	Goals	Apps	Goals	Apps	Goals
Greenock Morton	2016–17	Scottish Championship	8	0	0	0	7	0	2 (Note: One appearance in the Scottish Challenge Cup and one in the Premiership play-offs)	0	17	0
Greenock Morton	2017–18	Scottish Championship	31	3	3	0	3	0	0	0	37	3
Greenock Morton	Total		39	3	0	0	10	0	2 (Note: Appearances in the Scottish Challenge Cup)	0	54	3
Clyde (loan)	2016–17	Scottish League Two	6	0	0	0	0	0	0	0	6	0
Livingston	2018–19	Scottish Premiership	8	2	0	0	0	0	0	0	8	2
Livingston	2019–20	Scottish Premiership	8	0	0	0	3	0	0	0	11	0
Livingston	2020–21	Scottish Premiership	12	1	0	0	2	0	0	0	14	1
Livingston	Total		28	3	0	0	5	0	0	0	33	3
Greenock Morton (loan)	2018–19	Scottish Championship	11	3	0	0	0	0	1	0	12	3
Ayr United (loan)	2019–20	Scottish Championship	6	0	0	0	0	0	0	0	6	0
Partick Thistle (loan)	2020–21	Scottish League One	11	7	2	1	—		—		13	8
Partick Thistle	2021–22	Scottish Championship	29	5	3	0	3	0	4 (Note: Two appearances in the Scottish Challenge Cup and two in the Premiership play-offs)	0	39	5
Partick Thistle	2022–23	Scottish Championship	25	8	2	1	2	0	6 (Note: Appearances in the Premiership play-offs)	3	35	12
Partick Thistle	Total		54	13	5	1	5	0	10	3	74	17
Dundee	2023–24	Scottish Premiership	28	3	1	0	4	0	0	0	33	3
Dundee	2024–25	Scottish Premiership	35	6	2	0	6	1	0	0	43	7
Dundee	Total		63	9	3	0	10	1	0	0	76	10
Kilmarnock	2025–26	Scottish Premiership	12	1	1	0	3	0	0	0	16	1
Kilmarnock	2026–27	Scottish Premiership	0	0	0	0	0	0	0	0	0	0
Kilmarnock	Total		12	1	1	0	3	0	0	0	16	1
Kilmarnock B	2026–27	—			—		—		1	1	1	1
Raith Rovers (loan)	2026–27	Scottish Championship	3	0	0	0	—		0	0	3	0
Career total			233	39	14	2	33	1	13	3	294	46

== Honours ==
Morton

- SPFL Development League West: Winners 2015–16

Partick Thistle

- Scottish League One: 2020–21
