= Kyle Turner (footballer) =

Scottish footballer (born 1997)

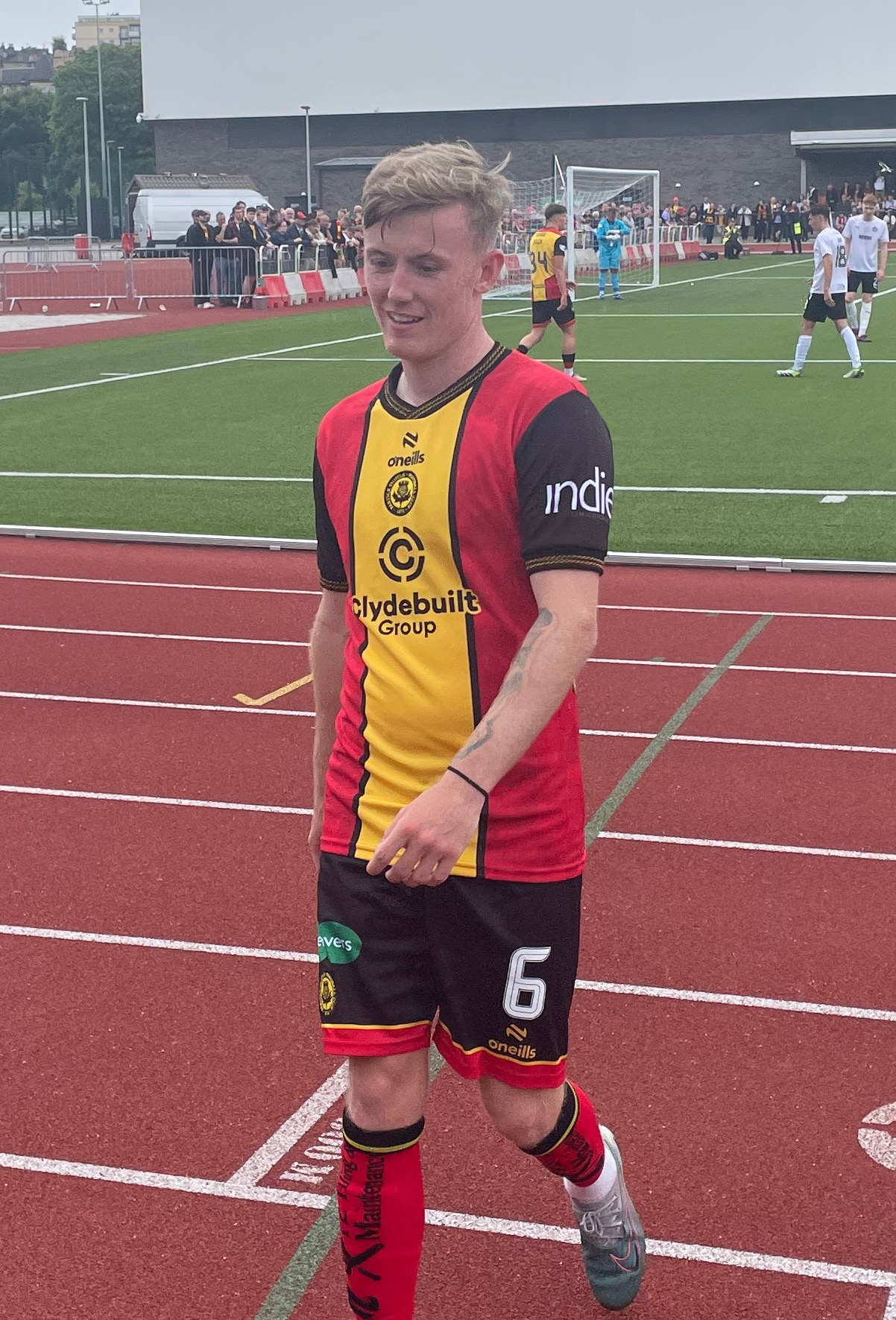
- Turner in 2024

Personal information
- Date of birth: 10 November 1997 (age 29)
- Place of birth: Paisley, Scotland
- Position: Midfielder

Team information
- Current team: Raith Rovers
- Number: 8

Youth career
- St Mirren
- Partick Thistle

Senior career*
| Years | Team | Apps | (Gls) |
| 2015–2019 | Stranraer | 114 | (16) |
| 2019–2021 | Dunfermline Athletic | 39 | (4) |
| 2021 | → Airdrieonians (loan) | 10 | (1) |
| 2021–2023 | Partick Thistle | 66 | (7) |
| 2023–2024 | Ross County | 16 | (1) |
| 2024 | → Raith Rovers (loan) | 11 | (0) |
| 2024–2026 | Partick Thistle | 64 | (2) |
| 2026– | Raith Rovers | 1 | (0) |
- * Club domestic league appearances and goals as of 20:36, 25 August 2026 (UTC)

Kyle Turner (born 10 November 1997) is a Scottish footballer who plays as a midfielder for Scottish Championship club Raith Rovers. Turner began his career with Stranraer, where he made 138 appearances over a four-year period, and has also played for Dunfermline Athletic, Partick Thistle and Ross County, and has also had a loan with Airdrieonians.

== Club career ==
=== Stranraer ===
Turner began his career playing with St Mirren and Partick Thistle youth teams, before signing with Scottish League One side Stranraer in 2015. His first appearance for the Stair Park club came as a final-minute substitution against Stenhousemuir on 12 September 2015, with his first full start coming a week later against Albion Rovers.

=== Dunfermline Athletic ===
Turner spent four years with Stranraer, before signing a two-year contract with Scottish Championship side Dunfermline Athletic on 28 May 2019. In March 2021, Turner moved on loan to Scottish League One club Airdrieonians until the end of the season. Turner left Dunfermline following the end of his contract in May 2021.

=== Partick Thistle (1st spell) ===
Turner signed a two-year deal with Scottish Championship club Partick Thistle, who he previously played with as a youth player.

Turner scored his first goal for Thistle, scoring a 96th minute winner in a 1-0 home win against Raith Rovers.

During his second season with Thistle, Turner was part of the squad that made it to the Scottish Premiership promotion play off final, which Thistle eventually lost on penalties to Ross County, meaning the club remained in the Scottish Championship. Following this Turner left the club.

=== Ross County ===
Turner signed a two-year contract with Scottish Premiership club Ross County in June 2023.

==== Raith Rovers (loan) ====
Turner joined Raith Rovers on loan until the end of the 23/24 season.

=== Partick Thistle (2nd spell) ===
In June 2024, Turner returned to Partick Thistle on a two-year deal.

Turner scored on his second Thistle debut in a 3–2 Scottish League Cup group stage win over Montrose, before scoring his first league goal in his second spell through a late penalty in a 1–0 home win over Ayr United.

He departed the club at the end of his contract.

=== Raith Rovers ===
Kyle Turner re-signed for Raith Rovers in June 2026 on a two-year deal. He made his return debut as a substitute in a league cup tie against Elgin City.

== Personal life ==
Turner is the son of former Morton, St Johnstone and St Mirren midfielder Tommy Turner.

== Career statistics ==
As of match played 22 August 2026

Appearances and goals by club, season and competition
| Club | Season | League | | | National Cup | | League Cup | | Other | | Total | |
| Club | Season | Division | Apps | Goals | Apps | Goals | Apps | Goals | Apps | Goals | Apps | Goals |
|---|---|---|---|---|---|---|---|---|---|---|---|---|
| Stranraer | 2015–16 | Scottish League One | 18 | 1 | 1 | 0 | 0 | 0 | 1 (Note: Appearances in the Scottish Championship play-offs) | 0 | 29 | 1 |
| Stranraer | 2016–17 | Scottish League One | 28 | 2 | 2 | 0 | 4 | 1 | 3 (Note: Appearances in the Scottish Challenge Cup) | 1 | 37 | 4 |
| Stranraer | 2017–18 | Scottish League One | 34 | 6 | 1 | 0 | 3 | 0 | 3 | 0 | 41 | 6 |
| Stranraer | 2018–19 | Scottish League One | 35 | 7 | 2 | 0 | 3 | 1 | 1 | 0 | 41 | 8 |
| Stranraer | Total | | 115 | 16 | 6 | 0 | 10 | 2 | 8 | 1 | 139 | 19 |
| Dunfermline Athletic | 2019–20 | Scottish Championship | 26 | 3 | 1 | 0 | 5 | 2 | 1 | 0 | 33 | 5 |
| Dunfermline Athletic | 2020–21 | Scottish Championship | 13 | 1 | 0 | 0 | 6 | 0 | 0 | 0 | 19 | 1 |
| Dunfermline Athletic | Total | | 39 | 4 | 1 | 0 | 11 | 2 | 1 | 0 | 52 | 6 |
| Airdrieonians(loan) | 2020-21 | Scottish Championship | 10 | 1 | 0 | 0 | 0 | 0 | 4 | 0 | 14 | 1 |
| Partick Thistle | 2021–22 | Scottish Championship | 31 | 2 | 2 | 0 | 4 | 0 | 1 (Note: Appearances in the Scottish Premiership play-offs) | 0 | 38 | 2 |
| Partick Thistle | 2022–23 | Scottish Championship | 35 | 5 | 3 | 0 | 5 | 1 | 6 | 1 | 50 | 7 |
| Partick Thistle | Total | | 66 | 7 | 5 | 0 | 9 | 1 | 11 | 1 | 88 | 9 |
| Ross County | 2023–24 | Scottish Premiership | 17 | 1 | 0 | 0 | 6 | 2 | 0 | 0 | 23 | 3 |
| Raith Rovers (loan) | 2023–24 | Scottish Championship | 13 | 0 | 1 | 0 | 0 | 0 | 3 | 0 | 17 | 0 |
| Partick Thistle | 2024–25 | Scottish Championship | 36 | 1 | 1 | 0 | 4 | 2 | 2 | 0 | 43 | 3 |
| Partick Thistle | 2025–26 | Scottish Championship | 28 | 1 | 4 | 0 | 1 | 0 | 2 | 0 | 35 | 1 |
| Partick Thistle | Total | | 64 | 2 | 5 | 0 | 5 | 2 | 4 | 0 | 78 | 4 |
| Raith Rovers | 2026–27 | Scottish Championship | 1 | 0 | 0 | 0 | 4 | 0 | 0 | 0 | 5 | 0 |
| Career total | | | 325 | 31 | 18 | 0 | 45 | 9 | 33 | 3 | 421 | 43 |
