= 2026–27 Highland Football League =

Breedon Highland League
- Season: 2026–27
- Dates: 25 July 2026 – 10 April 2027
- Matches: 157
- Goals: 590 (3.76 per match)
- Biggest home win: Brora Rangers 8–0 Wick Academy (5 August 2026)
- Biggest away win: Rothes 0–8 Brora Rangers (19 September 2026)
- Highest scoring: Keith 6–4 Invergordon (17 October 2026)
- Longest winning run: 7 matches: Brora Rangers
- Longest unbeaten run: 18 matches: Brora Rangers
- Longest winless run: 11 matches: Rothes
- Longest losing run: 10 matches: Rothes
- All statistics correct as of 21 November 2026.

The 2026–27 Highland Football League (known as the Breedon Highland League for sponsorship reasons) is the 124th season of the Highland Football League, and the 13th season as part of the fifth tier of the Scottish football pyramid system. Brora Rangers are the reigning champions for the second consecutive season.

== Teams ==
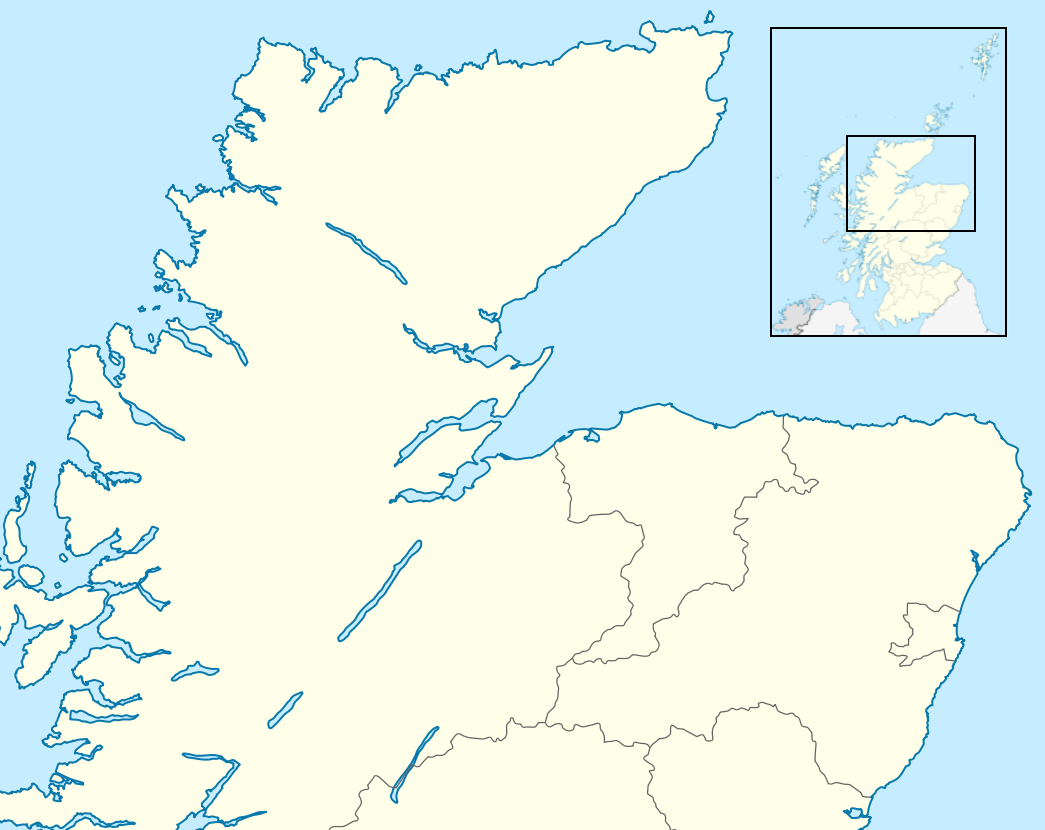
Location of teams in 2026–27 Highland Football League

=== From Highland League ===
Transferred to Lowland League East

- Brechin City

=== To Highland League ===
Promoted from North Caledonian League

- Invergordon

=== Stadia and locations ===
| Team | Location | Stadium (Note: All stadiums are equipped with floodlights as required by league regulations.) | Capacity | | 2025–26 season (Note: Positions in the 2025–26 Highland Football League unless stated.) |
| Team | Location | Stadium | Total | Seated | 2025–26 season |
|---|---|---|---|---|---|
| Banks o' Dee | Aberdeen | Spain Park | 876 | 122 | 6th |
| Brora Rangers | Brora | Dudgeon Park | 4,000 | 200 | 1st |
| Buckie Thistle | Buckie | Victoria Park | 3,000 | 400 | 8th |
| Clachnacuddin | Inverness | Grant Street Park | 2,074 | 154 | 5th |
| Deveronvale | Banff | Princess Royal Park | 2,561 | 360 | 14th |
| Formartine United | Pitmedden | North Lodge Park | 1,800 | 300 | 3rd |
| Forres Mechanics | Forres | Mosset Park | 2,700 | 502 | 12th |
| Fraserburgh | Fraserburgh | Bellslea Park | 1,865 | 480 | 4th |
| Huntly | Huntly | Christie Park | 2,200 | 270 | 11th |
| Invergordon | Invergordon | Recreation Grounds Invergordon | 800 | - | 1st, North Caledonian League |
| Inverurie Loco Works | Inverurie | Harlaw Park | 2,500 | 250 | 15th |
| Keith | Keith | Kynoch Park | 2,362 | 370 | 7th |
| Lossiemouth | Lossiemouth | Grant Park | 2,050 | 250 | 17th |
| Nairn County | Nairn | Station Park | 2,250 | 250 | 9th |
| Rothes | Rothes | Mackessack Park | 1,731 | 167 | 18th |
| Strathspey Thistle | Grantown-on-Spey | Seafield Park | 1,600 | 150 | 13th |
| Turriff United | Turriff | The Haughs | 2,135 | 135 | 10th |
| Wick Academy | Wick | Harmsworth Park | 2,412 | 300 | 16th |

== League table ==
| Pos | Team | Pld | W | D | L | GF | GA | GD | Pts | Qualification |
|---|---|---|---|---|---|---|---|---|---|---|
| 1 | Brora Rangers | 18 | 14 | 4 | 0 | 68 | 21 | +47 | 46 | Qualification for the Pyramid play-off |
| 2 | Inverurie Loco Works | 18 | 11 | 5 | 2 | 37 | 21 | +16 | 38 | |
| 3 | Fraserburgh | 19 | 10 | 7 | 2 | 48 | 20 | +28 | 37 | |
| 4 | Clachnacuddin | 17 | 8 | 6 | 3 | 41 | 19 | +22 | 30 | |
| 5 | Banks o' Dee | 16 | 8 | 4 | 4 | 42 | 29 | +13 | 28 | |
| 6 | Formartine United | 16 | 8 | 4 | 4 | 30 | 22 | +8 | 28 | |
| 7 | Huntly | 17 | 7 | 4 | 6 | 36 | 27 | +9 | 25 | |
| 8 | Forres Mechanics | 18 | 7 | 4 | 7 | 32 | 32 | 0 | 25 | |
| 9 | Nairn County | 18 | 6 | 6 | 6 | 28 | 31 | −3 | 24 | |
| 10 | Turriff United | 19 | 7 | 3 | 9 | 25 | 28 | −3 | 24 | |
| 11 | Strathspey Thistle | 18 | 6 | 5 | 7 | 32 | 27 | +5 | 23 | |
| 12 | Deveronvale | 18 | 6 | 4 | 8 | 28 | 31 | −3 | 22 | |
| 13 | Keith | 17 | 6 | 3 | 8 | 28 | 39 | −11 | 21 | |
| 14 | Buckie Thistle | 15 | 6 | 1 | 8 | 35 | 29 | +6 | 19 | |
| 15 | Lossiemouth | 17 | 5 | 3 | 9 | 24 | 42 | −18 | 18 | |
| 16 | Wick Academy | 18 | 4 | 1 | 13 | 20 | 47 | −27 | 13 | |
| 17 | Invergordon | 18 | 4 | 1 | 13 | 24 | 57 | −33 | 13 | |
| 18 | Rothes | 17 | 1 | 1 | 15 | 12 | 68 | −56 | 4 | Qualification for the Highland League play-off |

Updated to match(es) played on 21 November 2026. Source: BBC, Highland League
Rules for classification: 1) Points; 2) Goal difference; 3) Number of goals scored

=== Results ===
| Home \ Away | BAN | BRO | BUC | CLA | DEV | FOU | FOM | FRA | HUN | IVG | ILW | KEI | LOS | NAI | ROT | STR | TUR | WIC |
|---|---|---|---|---|---|---|---|---|---|---|---|---|---|---|---|---|---|---|
| Banks o' Dee | | | | 4–0 | | 3–2 | | 1–3 | | 6–3 | 1–1 | 4–1 | | | | 1–1 | 1–0 | 2–0 |
| Brora Rangers | 4–2 | | | | 3–0 | | | | | 7–2 | 0–0 | 5–0 | 4–2 | 2–1 | | | 3–1 | 8–0 |
| Buckie Thistle | 7–2 | 2–2 | | | 2–3 | | | | 0–3 | | 2–0 | | 2–4 | 1–3 | 5–0 | | | 1–3 |
| Clachnacuddin | | 3–3 | 3–0 | | | 1–1 | | | | 1–0 | | 1–1 | 4–0 | 6–1 | | 3–1 | 0–0 | |
| Deveronvale | | 2–5 | | 2–2 | | | 1–1 | 3–1 | | | 4–5 | | | | 3–0 | | 1–2 | 2–1 |
| Formartine United | | 1–4 | | | 2–1 | | | | 2–2 | | | 4–1 | 3–0 | 1–1 | | | | |
| Forres Mechanics | 3–0 | 2–5 | 2–1 | 2–1 | | 1–2 | | 0–2 | 2–2 | | | 5–1 | | | 2–2 | | | |
| Fraserburgh | | 1–1 | | 2–2 | | 1–1 | 4–1 | | 4–2 | 0–0 | | 1–0 | | 2–0 | | 2–2 | | |
| Huntly | 2–2 | 1–2 | | 1–6 | 1–0 | | | | | 7–0 | 2–2 | 2–0 | | 4–0 | | | | 3–0 |
| Invergordon | | | 0–6 | | 3–0 | 1–2 | 2–4 | 0–7 | | | | | 1–2 | | 2–0 | 0–2 | 3–1 | |
| Inverurie Loco Works | | | | 1–0 | | 0–2 | 3–3 | 2–1 | | 1–0 | | | 3–1 | 3–1 | | 1–1 | | 2–0 |
| Keith | | | 3–2 | | 2–0 | | | | | 6–4 | 0–4 | | 2–2 | 1–1 | | 2–3 | 1–0 | 4–1 |
| Lossiemouth | 0–6 | | | | 0–2 | | 2–1 | 0–4 | 1–0 | | | | | | 4–1 | | 0–2 | 3–4 |
| Nairn County | 2–2 | | | | 0–0 | | 1–2 | 2–2 | | 4–1 | | | 1–1 | | 3–0 | 3–2 | 2–1 | 2–0 |
| Rothes | 0–5 | 0–8 | | | 0–3 | 2–4 | | 0–7 | 1–3 | | 1–3 | 0–3 | | | | | | 3–2 |
| Strathspey Thistle | | 1–2 | 0–2 | | 1–1 | 1–2 | 0–1 | | 3–0 | | 1–3 | | 2–2 | | 7–1 | | | |
| Turriff United | | | 1–2 | 0–4 | | 1–0 | 2–0 | 1–1 | 2–1 | | 1–3 | | | | 4–1 | 1–2 | | 3–3 |
| Wick Academy | | | | 0–4 | | 2–1 | 1–0 | 2–3 | | 1–2 | | | | | | 0–2 | 0–2 | |

Updated to match(es) played on 21 November 2026. Source: =BBC, Highland League
Legend: Blue = home team win; Yellow = draw; Red = away team win.

== Highland League play-off ==
Subject to the tier 6 champion clubs meeting the required licensing criteria for promotion, a play-off is scheduled to place between the winners of the North Caledonian Football League and the North of Scotland Football League, with the winners then playing the team who finishes bottom of the Highland League. As of November 2026, only Golspie Sutherland of the North Caledonian Football League meet licensing criteria.
