= 2026–27 in Scottish football =

Football in Scotland
- Season: 2026–27

2026–27 in Scottish football
- Premiership champions
- Championship champions
- League 1 champions
- League 2 champions
- Scottish Cup winners
- League Cup winners
- Challenge Cup winners
- Youth Cup winners
- Teams in Europe
- Celtic, Heart of Midlothian, Rangers, Motherwell, Hibernian
- Scotland national team
- 2026–27 UEFA Nations League B

The 2026–27 season is the 130th season of competitive football in Scotland. The domestic season began in mid-July with the first Scottish League Cup group stage matches, and the first round of matches in the 2026–27 Scottish Premiership were played on the weekend of 1–2 August.

== League competitions ==
=== Scottish Premiership ===
Pos	Team	Pld	W	D	L	GF	GA	GD	Pts	Qualification or relegation (Note: Teams play each other three times (33 matches), before the league is split into two groups (the top six and the bottom six).)
1	Celtic	13	10	1	2	28	10	+18	31	Qualification for the Champions League second qualifying round
2	Rangers	12	8	3	1	21	9	+12	27	Qualification for the Conference League second qualifying round (Note: The winners of the 2026–27 Scottish Cup will qualify for the Europa League. If the cup winners also win the league, the spot reserved for the cup winners (Europa League first qualifying round) will pass to the second-placed team, and the spots for the Conference League second qualifying round will move down one league position.)
3	Falkirk	13	6	3	4	20	14	+6	21	Qualification for the Conference League second qualifying round
4	Heart of Midlothian	12	6	2	4	26	22	+4	20	
5	Dundee	12	5	2	5	18	15	+3	17	
6	Dundee United	12	4	5	3	17	17	0	17	
7	St Johnstone	13	4	5	4	17	20	−3	17	
8	St Mirren	13	4	2	7	12	22	−10	14	
9	Motherwell	13	3	4	6	15	21	−6	13	
10	Hibernian	12	3	2	7	15	17	−2	11	
11	Aberdeen	12	3	2	7	12	18	−6	11	Qualification for the Premiership play-off final
12	Kilmarnock	13	2	3	8	13	29	−16	9	Relegation to the Championship

Updated to match(es) played on 8 November 2026. Source:
Rules for classification: 1) Points; 2) Goal difference; 3) Goals scored; 4) Head-to-head points; 5) Head-to-head goal difference; 6) Play-off (only if deciding champion, UEFA competition qualification, second stage group allocation, or relegation).

=== Scottish Championship ===
Pos	Team	Pld	W	D	L	GF	GA	GD	Pts	Promotion, qualification or relegation
1	Partick Thistle	14	8	4	2	18	7	+11	28	Promotion to the Premiership
2	Raith Rovers	14	7	4	3	20	9	+11	25	Qualification for the Premiership play-off semi-final
3	Dunfermline Athletic	14	6	7	1	15	7	+8	25	Qualification for the Premiership play-off quarter-final
4	Stenhousemuir	14	7	2	5	16	16	0	23	Qualification for the Premiership play-off quarter-final
5	Livingston	14	6	3	5	19	12	+7	21	
6	Inverness Caledonian Thistle	14	5	5	4	18	17	+1	20	
7	Ayr United	13	4	3	6	14	18	−4	15	
8	Arbroath	14	4	2	8	11	23	−12	14	
9	Greenock Morton	13	4	1	8	16	23	−7	13	Qualification for the Championship play-offs
10	Queen's Park	14	2	1	11	8	23	−15	7	Relegation to League One

Updated to match(es) played on 7 November 2026. Source:
Rules for classification: 1) Points; 2) Goal difference; 3) Goals scored; 4) Head-to head points; 5) Head-to-head goal difference; 6) Play-off (only for deciding promotion, play-off participation and relegation).

=== Scottish League One ===
Pos	Team	Pld	W	D	L	GF	GA	GD	Pts	Promotion, qualification or relegation
1	Ross County	14	12	2	0	49	9	+40	38	Promotion to the Championship
2	Hamilton Academical	14	10	3	1	27	10	+17	33	Qualification for the Championship play-offs
3	East Kilbride	13	6	3	4	23	18	+5	21	Qualification for the Championship play-offs
4	Montrose	14	6	2	6	19	23	−4	20	Qualification for the Championship play-offs
5	Airdrieonians	14	4	4	6	13	22	−9	16	
6	East Fife	14	3	6	5	13	17	−4	15	
7	Peterhead	14	4	1	9	12	25	−13	13	
8	Queen of the South	14	4	1	9	14	38	−24	13	
9	Alloa Athletic	14	3	3	8	15	19	−4	12	Qualification for the League One play-offs
10	Cove Rangers	13	3	3	7	14	18	−4	12	Relegation to League Two

Updated to match(es) played on 7 November 2026. Source:
Rules for classification: 1) Points; 2) Goal difference; 3) Goals scored; 4) Head-to head points; 5) Head-to-head goal difference; 6) Play-off (only for deciding promotion, play-off participation and relegation).

=== Scottish League Two ===
Pos	Team	Pld	W	D	L	GF	GA	GD	Pts	Promotion, qualification or relegation
1	Stranraer	13	8	3	2	28	9	+19	27	Promotion to League One
2	Clyde	13	8	3	2	30	20	+10	27	Qualification for the League One play-offs
3	Elgin City	13	6	3	4	28	19	+9	21	Qualification for the League One play-offs
4	The Spartans	13	5	3	5	27	25	+2	18	Qualification for the League One play-offs
5	Kelty Hearts	13	6	0	7	18	23	−5	18	
6	Dumbarton	13	5	1	7	15	20	−5	16	
7	Edinburgh City	13	5	5	3	23	20	+3	15 (Note: Edinburgh City were deducted 5 points due to an insolvency event during the previous season.)	
8	Stirling Albion	13	4	3	6	19	29	−10	15	
9	Forfar Athletic	13	3	3	7	14	25	−11	12	
10	Annan Athletic	13	3	0	10	14	26	−12	9	Qualification for the League Two play-off final

Updated to match(es) played on 7 November 2026. Source:
Rules for classification: 1) Points; 2) Goal difference; 3) Goals scored; 4) Head-to-head points; 5) Head-to-head goal difference; 6) Play-off (only for deciding promotion, play-off participation and relegation).

=== Non-league football ===
==== Level 5 ====
Highland Football League
Pos	Team	Pld	Pts
1	Brora Rangers	16	42
2	Inverurie Loco Works	17	35
3	Fraserburgh	17	31
4	Formartine United	15	28
5	Clachnacuddin	15	26
6	Banks o' Dee	15	25
7	Huntly	16	25
8	Forres Mechanics	17	24
9	Strathspey Thistle	18	23
10	Deveronvale	17	22
11	Turriff United	17	21
12	Nairn County	17	21
13	Keith	16	21
14	Buckie Thistle	14	19
15	Lossiemouth	16	18
16	Invergordon	16	13
17	Wick Academy	17	10
18	Rothes	16	3

Updated to match(es) played on 13 November 2026.
Source: BBC, Highland League

Lowland Football League West
Pos	Team	Pld	Pts
1	Kilwinning Rangers	13	33
2	Largs Thistle	15	32
3	Clydebank	13	29
4	Auchinleck Talbot	13	28
5	Pollok	12	26
6	Caledonian Braves	13	26
7	Celtic B	13	23
8	Cumnock Juniors	14	21
9	Troon	15	21
10	Johnstone Burgh	12	19
11	Cumbernauld Colts	12	14
12	Gretna 2008	15	14
13	Renfrew	13	13
14	Albion Rovers	14	9
15	Beith Juniors	13	9
16	Newton Stewart	12	4
17	Dalbeattie Star	14	1

Updated to match(es) played on 13 November 2026.

Lowland Football League East
Pos	Team	Pld	Pts
1	Tranent	13	32
2	Linlithgow Rose	13	31
3	Brechin City	13	31
4	Broxburn Athletic	14	28
5	Hill of Beath Hawthorn	12	25
6	Lochee United	13	24
7	Bo'ness United	14	22
8	Civil Service Strollers	13	21
9	Bonnyrigg Rose	13	20
10	East Stirlingshire	14	15
11	Cowdenbeath	11	13
12	Musselburgh Athletic	12	11
13	Gala Fairydean Rovers	14	7
14	Berwick Rangers	14	6
15	University of Stirling	14	6
16	Dunipace	11	4

Updated to match(es) played on 7 November 2026.

== Honours ==
=== Cup honours ===
Competition	Winner	Score	Runner-up	Match report
2026–27 Scottish Cup				
2026–27 League Cup				
2026–27 Challenge Cup				
2026–27 South Challenge Cup				
2026–27 Youth Cup				
2026–27 Junior Cup				

=== Non-league honours ===
Level	Competition	Winner
5	Highland League	
5	Lowland League East	
5	Lowland League West	
6	Midlands League	
6	North Caledonian League	
6	North of Scotland League Premier Division	
6	East of Scotland League Premier Division	
6	South of Scotland League	
6	West of Scotland League Premier Division	
7	North of Scotland League Championship	
7	East of Scotland League First Division	
7	West of Scotland League First Division	
8	East of Scotland League Second Division Conference NW	
8	East of Scotland League Second Division Conference SE	
8	West of Scotland League Second Division	
9	West of Scotland League Third Division	
10	West of Scotland League Fourth Division	

=== Individual honours ===
==== PFA Scotland awards ====
Award	Winner	Team
Players' Player of the Year		
Young Player of the Year		
Manager of the Year		
Championship Player		
League One Player		
League Two Player		

==== SFWA awards ====
Award	Winner	Team
Footballer of the Year		
Young Player of the Year		
Manager of the Year		

== UEFA competitions ==
=== UEFA Champions League ===
==== Qualifying phase and play-off round ====
===== Second qualifying round =====
Second qualifying round
Team 1	Agg.	Team 2	1st leg	2nd leg
Sturm Graz (Austria)	6–0	(Scotland) Heart of Midlothian	4–0	2–0

===== Play-off round =====
Play-off round
Team 1	Agg.	Team 2	1st leg	2nd leg
Celtic (Scotland)	4–5	(Austria) LASK	3–0	1–5 (a.e.t.)

=== UEFA Europa League ===
==== Qualifying phase and play-off round ====
===== Third qualifying round =====
Third qualifying round
Team 1	Agg.	Team 2	1st leg	2nd leg
Jagiellonia Białystok (Poland)	3–2	(Scotland) Rangers	2–1	1–1
Benfica (Portugal)	7–2	(Scotland) Heart of Midlothian	6–1	1–1

==== League phase ====
===== Celtic =====
Pos	Team	Pld	W	D	L	GF	GA	GD	Pts
30	(Czech Republic) Viktoria Plzeň	4	1	0	3	3	7	−4	3
31	(France) Marseille	4	1	0	3	2	6	−4	3
32	(Scotland) Celtic	4	1	0	3	6	11	−5	3
33	(Israel) Hapoel Be'er Sheva	4	0	1	3	1	8	−7	1
34	(Norway) Lillestrøm	4	0	1	3	2	10	−8	1

Updated to match(es) played on 5 November 2026. Source: UEFA
Rules for classification: League phase tiebreakers

=== UEFA Conference League ===
==== Second qualifying round ====
Second qualifying round
Team 1	Agg.	Team 2	1st leg	2nd leg
Motherwell (Scotland)	5–0	(Faroe Islands) HB	2–0	3–0
Malisheva (Kosovo)	3–4	(Scotland) Hibernian	2–0	1–4

==== Third qualifying round ====
Third qualifying round
Team 1	Agg.	Team 2	1st leg	2nd leg
HJK (Finland)	1–3	(Scotland) Motherwell	1–1	0–2
Hibernian (Scotland)	2–1	(North Macedonia) Shkëndija	2–1	0–0

==== Play-off round ====
Play-off round
Team 1	Agg.	Team 2	1st leg	2nd leg
Motherwell (Scotland)	2–7	(Germany) SC Freiburg	1–3	1–4
Heart of Midlothian (Scotland)	4–4 (4–3 p)	(Austria) Rapid Wien	2–2	2–2 (a.e.t.)
Gent (Belgium)	3–2	(Scotland) Hibernian	0–0	3–2
Rangers (Scotland)	1–1 (3–4 p)	(Czech Republic) Jablonec	1–0	0–1 (a.e.t.)

==== League phase ====
===== Heart of Midlothian =====
Pos	Team	Pld	W	D	L	GF	GA	GD	Pts
30	(Cyprus) Pafos	3	0	1	2	3	7	−4	1
31	(Spain) Getafe	3	0	1	2	3	7	−4	1
32	(Scotland) Heart of Midlothian	3	0	1	2	2	6	−4	1
33	(Finland) KuPS	3	0	1	2	2	6	−4	1
34	(Denmark) Midtjylland	3	0	1	2	2	8	−6	1

Updated to match(es) played on 5 November 2026. Source: UEFA
Rules for classification: League phase tiebreakers

=== Summary ===
Club	Competitions	Started round	Final round	Coef.
Celtic	UEFA Champions League	Play-off round	Play-off round	1.0
Celtic	UEFA Europa League	League phase		1.0
Heart of Midlothian	UEFA Champions League	Second qualifying round	Second qualifying round	1.5
Heart of Midlothian	UEFA Europa League	Third qualifying round	Third qualifying round	1.5
Heart of Midlothian	UEFA Conference League	Play-off round		1.5
Rangers	UEFA Europa League	Third qualifying round	Third qualifying round	1.5
Rangers	UEFA Conference League	Play-off round	Play-off round	1.5
Motherwell	UEFA Conference League	Second qualifying round	Play-off round	3.5
Hibernian	UEFA Conference League	Second qualifying round	Play-off round	3.0
Total				10.5
Average				2.1

== Scotland national team ==
26 September 2026 UNL B	Slovenia	0–0	Scotland	Ljubljana
		Report		Stadium: Stožice Stadium; Attendance: 12,182; Referee: Horațiu Feșnic (Romania)

29 September 2026 UNL B	Scotland	0–3	Switzerland	Glasgow
		Report	Rodriguez 12'; Elvedi 55'; Amdouni 82'	Stadium: Hampden Park; Attendance: 41,028; Referee: Nenad Minaković (Serbia)

3 October 2026 UNL B	North Macedonia	0–2	Scotland	Skopje
		Report	Bowie 7'; McGinn 70' (pen.)	Stadium: Toše Proeski Arena; Attendance: 8,256; Referee: François Letexier (France)

6 October 2026 UNL B	Scotland	1–2	Slovenia	Glasgow
	Christie 34'	Report	Matko 56'; Šturm 71'	Stadium: Hampden Park; Referee: José María Sánchez Martínez (Spain)

13 November 2026 UNL B	Scotland	2–1	North Macedonia	Glasgow
	McGinn 54', 74' (pen.)	Report	Rastoder 57'	Stadium: Hampden Park; Attendance: 41,585; Referee: Michal Očenáš (Slovakia)

16 November 2026 UNL B	Switzerland	–	Scotland	St. Gallen
		Report		Stadium: Sitterstadion

== Women's football ==
=== League and Cup honours ===
Division	Winner
2026–27 SWPL 1	
2026–27 SWPL 2	
2026–27 SWF Championship	
2026–27 SWF League One	

Competition	Winner	Score	Runner-up	Match report
Scottish Women's Cup				
Scottish Women's Premier League Cup				
SWFL National League Cup				

=== Individual honours ===
==== SWPL awards ====
Award	Winner	Team
Players' Player of the Year		
Player of the Year		
Manager of the Year		
Young Player of the Year		

=== Scotland women's national team ===
9 October World Cup 2027 play-offs	Czech Republic	0–2	Scotland	Pardubice
		Report	Weir 57'; Emslie 65'	Stadium: Stadion Arnošta Košťála

13 October World Cup 2027 play-offs	Scotland	3–2 (5–2 agg.)	Czech Republic	Paisley
20:15 (19:15 UTC+1)	Davidson 5'; McGovern 49'; Grimshaw 72'	Report (FIFA); Report (UEFA)	Veselá 3'; Cahynová 33'	Stadium: St Mirren Park; Referee: Maria Sole Ferrieri Caputi (Italy)

November World Cup 2027 play-offs	Scotland	v	Sweden

December World Cup 2027 play-offs	Sweden	v	Scotland

== Deaths ==
- 10 July: Mike Larnach, 73, Clydebank, Motherwell, Ayr United and Stenhousemuir forward.
- August: Bobby Ross, Hearts forward.
- 19 September: Willie Callaghan, 83, Dunfermline, Berwick Rangers, Cowdenbeath and Scotland defender.
