= Rory McAllister =

Rory McAllister may refer to:

- Rory McAllister (footballer) (born 1987), Scottish footballer currently playing for Formartine United
- Rory McAllister (wrestler), member of The Highlanders tag team
