= 2026–27 Scottish Championship =

2026-2027 Scottish Football Championship

Scottish Championship
- Season: 2026–27
- Dates: 1 August 2026 – 30 April 2027
- Matches: 77
- Goals: 178 (2.31 per match)
- Top goalscorer: Robbie Muirhead (11 goals)
- Biggest home win: Raith Rovers 4–0 Arbroath (12 September 2026); Dunfermline Athletic 5–1 Inverness Caledonian Thistle (31 October 2026)
- Biggest away win: Arbroath 0–4 Raith Rovers (31 October 2026)
- Highest scoring: Greenock Morton 4–3 Stenhousemuir (7 November 2026)
- Longest winning run: Stenhousemuir (7 games)
- Longest unbeaten run: Dunfermline Athletic (11 games)
- Longest winless run: Greenock Morton (9 games)
- Longest losing run: Queen's Park (6 games)
- Highest attendance: 7,281; Dunfermline Athletic v Raith Rovers; 28 August 2026
- Lowest attendance: 618; Stenhousemuir v Arbroath; 19 September 2026
- Total attendance: 186,288
- Average attendance: 2,419
- All statistics correct as of 21 November 2026.

The 2026–27 Scottish Championship (known as the William Hill Championship for sponsorship reasons) is the 14th season of the Scottish Championship, the second tier of Scottish football. The season started on 1 August 2026 and will end on 30 April 2027.

Ten teams are contesting the league: Arbroath, Ayr United, Dunfermline Athletic, Greenock Morton, Inverness Caledonian Thistle, Livingston, Partick Thistle, Queen's Park, Raith Rovers and Stenhousemuir.

== Teams ==
The following teams changed division after the 2025–26 season.

=== To Championship ===
Promoted from League One

- Inverness Caledonian Thistle
- Stenhousemuir

Relegated from the Premiership

- Livingston

=== From Championship ===
Relegated to League One

- Airdrieonians
- Ross County

Promoted to the Premiership

- St Johnstone

=== Stadia and locations ===
Arbroath	Ayr United	Dunfermline Athletic	Greenock Morton
Gayfield Park	Somerset Park	East End Park	Cappielow
Capacity: 6,056	Capacity: 10,185	Capacity: 11,480	Capacity: 11,589
Inverness Caledonian Thistle	Location of teams in 2026–27 Scottish Championship		Livingston
Caledonian Stadium	Location of teams in 2026–27 Scottish Championship		Almondvale Stadium
Capacity: 7,512	Location of teams in 2026–27 Scottish Championship		Capacity: 9,713
Partick Thistle	Queen's Park	Raith Rovers	Stenhousemuir
Firhill Stadium	Lesser Hampden	Stark's Park	Ochilview Park
Capacity: 10,887	Capacity: 990	Capacity: 8,867	Capacity: 3,746

Championship football clubs in Glasgow

=== Personnel and kits ===
Team	Manager	Captain	Kit manufacturer	Shirt sponsor
Arbroath	(Scotland) David Gold (Scotland) Colin Hamilton	(Scotland) Thomas O'Brien	Macron	Megatech
Ayr United	(Scotland) Gary Naysmith	(Scotland) Reece Lyon	O'Neills	Jewson
Dunfermline Athletic	(Northern Ireland) Neil Lennon	(Scotland) Charlie Gilmour	Erreà	Gamdom
Greenock Morton	Vacant	(Scotland) Grant Gillespie	Joma	Dalrada Technology (Home); Forrest Precision Engineering (Away)
Inverness Caledonian Thistle	(Scotland) Scott Kellacher	(Northern Ireland) Danny Devine	Macron	BetGoodwin
Livingston	(Scotland) David Martindale (Scotland) Frankie McAvoy (interim)	(Australia) Ryan McGowan	Joma	Livi Self Storage
Partick Thistle	(Scotland) Mark Wilson	(Scotland) Lee Ashcroft	Macron	WrightKerr All Trades Limited
Queen's Park	(Scotland) Sean Crighton	(Scotland) Euan Murray	Adidas	City Facilities Management
Raith Rovers	(Scotland) Dougie Imrie	(Scotland) Scott Brown	Joma	Audio Emotion (Home); Sephra (Away)
Stenhousemuir	(England) Marvin Bartley	(Scotland) Ross Meechan	Uhlsport	Jewson

=== Managerial changes ===
Team	Outgoing manager	Manner of departure	Date of vacancy	Position in table	Incoming manager	Date of appointment
Livingston	(England) Marvin Bartley	Resigned	7 May 2026	Pre-season	(Republic of Ireland) Glenn Whelan	30 May 2026
Ayr United	(Scotland) John Rankin	End of interim spell	5 May 2026	Pre-season	(Scotland) Gary Naysmith	16 May 2026
Stenhousemuir	(Scotland) Gary Naysmith	Signed by Ayr United	16 May 2026	Pre-season	(England) Marvin Bartley	9 Jun 2026
Livingston	(Republic of Ireland) Glenn Whelan	Sacked	6 September 2026	5th		
Greenock Morton	(Scotland) Ian Murray	Sacked	1 October 2026	10th		

== League table ==
Pos	Team	Pld	W	D	L	GF	GA	GD	Pts	Promotion, qualification or relegation
1	Partick Thistle	16	10	4	2	23	9	+14	34	Promotion to the Premiership
2	Livingston	16	8	3	5	25	13	+12	27	Qualification for the Premiership play-off semi-final
3	Stenhousemuir	16	8	2	6	19	18	+1	26	Qualification for the Premiership play-off quarter-final
4	Dunfermline Athletic	14	6	7	1	15	7	+8	25	Qualification for the Premiership play-off quarter-final
5	Raith Rovers	16	7	4	5	21	14	+7	25	
6	Inverness Caledonian Thistle	16	5	6	5	20	20	0	21	
7	Ayr United	15	5	4	6	17	19	−2	19	
8	Arbroath	15	5	2	8	13	24	−11	17	
9	Greenock Morton	14	4	1	9	16	25	−9	13	Qualification for the Championship play-offs
10	Queen's Park	16	2	1	13	9	29	−20	7	Relegation to League One

Updated to match(es) played on 21 November 2026. Source:
Rules for classification: 1) Points; 2) Goal difference; 3) Goals scored; 4) Head-to head points; 5) Head-to-head goal difference; 6) Play-off (only for deciding promotion, play-off participation and relegation).

== Results ==
Teams play each other four times, twice in the first half of the season (home and away) and twice in the second half of the season (home and away), making a total of 180 games, with each team playing 36.

=== First half of season (Matches 1–18) ===
Home \ Away	ARB	AYR	DNF	GMO	ICT	LIV	PAR	QPA	RAI	STE
Arbroath	—	4–1	1–1	1–2	0–0	1–0	11 Dec	2–1	0–4	2–1
Ayr United	2–0	—	1–1	1–1	1–3	12 Dec	0–1	3–2	3–1	0–1
Dunfermline Athletic	1 Dec	1–1	—	TBC	5–1	0–0	1–1	2–0	1–0	12 Dec
Greenock Morton	1–2	1 Dec	0–1	—	5 Dec	1–4	0–1	2–0	1–2	4–3
Inverness Caledonian Thistle	2–0	0–0	0–0	2–0	—	1–1	1–1	12 Dec	0–2	2–0
Livingston	1–0	1–2	2–0	2–0	2–2	—	1–2	2–0	4 Dec	0–1
Partick Thistle	3–0	1–0	5 Dec	2–3	3–2	2–0	—	0–0	0–0	3–0
Queen's Park	5 Dec	0–2	0–1	2–1	2–1	1–4	0–1	—	1–2	0–2
Raith Rovers	4–0	2–0	0–0	12 Dec	0–2	0–2	0–2	2–0	—	1–1
Stenhousemuir	1–0	5 Dec	0–1	2–0	3–1	0–3	1–0	2–0	1–1	—

Updated to match(es) played on 21 November 2026. Source:
Legend: Blue = home team win; Yellow = draw; Red = away team win.

=== Second half of season (Matches 19–36) ===
Home \ Away	ARB	AYR	DNF	GMO	ICT	LIV	PAR	QPA	RAI	STE
Arbroath	—	27 Mar	23 Jan	6 Mar	23 Dec	30 Jan	30 Apr	20 Feb	13 Mar	10 Apr
Ayr United	9 Jan	—	10 Apr	23 Dec	13 Feb	30 Apr	6 Mar	20 Mar	3 Apr	20 Feb
Dunfermline Athletic	17 Apr	30 Jan	—	3 Apr	13 Mar	6 Mar	20 Feb	9 Jan	26 Dec	30 Apr
Greenock Morton	19 Dec	13 Mar	13 Feb	—	24 Apr	2 Jan	23 Jan	17 Apr	27 Feb	27 Mar
Inverness Caledonian Thistle	20 Mar	17 Apr	2 Jan	20 Feb	—	27 Mar	30 Jan	30 Apr	9 Jan	6 Mar
Livingston	3 Apr	27 Feb	19 Dec	20 Mar	23 Jan	—	17 Apr	13 Feb	24 Apr	26 Dec
Partick Thistle	27 Feb	19 Dec	24 Apr	10 Apr	3 Apr	9 Jan	—	26 Dec	13 Feb	20 Mar
Queen's Park	24 Apr	2 Jan	27 Mar	30 Jan	27 Feb	10 Apr	13 Mar	—	18 Dec	23 Jan
Raith Rovers	2 Jan	23 Jan	20 Mar	30 Apr	10 Apr	20 Feb	27 Mar	6 Mar	—	30 Jan
Stenhousemuir	13 Feb	24 Apr	27 Feb	9 Jan	19 Dec	13 Mar	2 Jan	3 Apr	17 Apr	—

First match(es) will be played: 18 December 2026. Source:
Legend: Blue = home team win; Yellow = draw; Red = away team win.

== Season statistics ==
As of 21 November 2026

=== Scoring ===
==== Top scorers ====
Rank	Player	Club	Goals
1	(Scotland) Robbie Muirhead	Livingston	11
2	(England) George Oakley	Raith Rovers	6
3	(Scotland) Alfie Bavidge	Inverness Caledonian Thistle	5
3	(Scotland) Tony Watt	Partick Thistle	5
5	(Scotland) Josh Cooper	Dunfermline Athletic	4
5	(United States) Dylan Borso	Greenock Morton	4
5	(Scotland) Euan Henderson	Partick Thistle	4
5	(Scotland) Aidan Connolly	Queen's Park	4
5	(Scotland) Anton Dowds	Raith Rovers	4
5	(England) Jai Rowe	Raith Rovers	4

== Awards ==
Month	Manager of the Month		Player of the Month	
Month	Manager	Club	Player	Club
August	(England) Marvin Bartley	Stenhousemuir	(Scotland) Lewis O'Donnell	Stenhousemuir
September	(England) Marvin Bartley	Stenhousemuir	(Scotland) Robbie Muirhead	Livingston
October	(Northern Ireland) Neil Lennon	Dunfermline Athletic	(England) George Oakley	Raith Rovers
November				
December				
January				
February				
March				
April				
