= 2026–27 Scottish League One =

Scottish League One
- Season: 2026–27
- Dates: 1 August 2026 – 1 May 2027
- Matches: 79
- Goals: 228 (2.89 per match)
- Top goalscorer: Brian Graham (16 goals)
- Biggest home win: Ross County 8–0 Queen of the South (15 September 2026)
- Biggest away win: Queen of the South 1–7 Ross County (17 October 2026)
- Highest scoring: Ross County 8–0 Queen of the South (15 September 2026); Queen of the South 1–7 Ross County (17 October 2026)
- Longest winning run: Hamilton Academical; Ross County (6 games)
- Longest unbeaten run: Ross County (16 games)
- Longest winless run: East Fife (10 games)
- Longest losing run: Peterhead (5 games)
- Highest attendance: 2,767; Ross County v Hamilton Academical (27 October 2026)
- Lowest attendance: 232; Cove Rangers v Alloa Athletic (5 September 2026)
- Total attendance: 65,847
- Average attendance: 866
- All statistics correct as of 21 November 2026.

The 2026–27 Scottish League One (known as William Hill League One for sponsorship reasons) is the 14th season of Scottish League One, the third tier of Scottish football. The season began on 1 August 2026.

Ten teams are contesting the league: Airdrieonians, Alloa Athletic, Cove Rangers, East Fife, East Kilbride, Hamilton Academical, Montrose, Peterhead, Queen of the South and Ross County.

== Teams ==
The following teams changed division after the 2025–26 season.

=== To League One ===
Promoted from League Two

- East Kilbride

Relegated from the Championship

- Airdrieonians
- Ross County

=== From League One ===
Relegated to League Two

- Kelty Hearts

Promoted to the Championship

- Inverness Caledonian Thistle
- Stenhousemuir

=== Stadia and locations ===
Airdrieonians	Alloa Athletic	Cove Rangers	East Fife
Excelsior Stadium	Recreation Park	Balmoral Stadium	Bayview Stadium
Capacity: 10,101	Capacity: 3,100	Capacity: 2,602	Capacity: 1,980
East Kilbride	Location of teams in 2026–27 Scottish League One		Hamilton Academical
K-Park Training Academy	Location of teams in 2026–27 Scottish League One		New Douglas Park
Capacity: 700	Location of teams in 2026–27 Scottish League One		Capacity: 6,018
Montrose	Peterhead	Queen of the South	Ross County
Links Park	Balmoor	Palmerston Park	Victoria Park
Capacity: 4,936	Capacity: 3,150	Capacity: 8,690	Capacity: 6,541

Notes

All grounds are equipped with floodlights.

=== Personnel and kits ===
Team	Manager	Captain	Kit manufacturer	Shirt sponsor
Airdrieonians	(Scotland) John Rankin	(Scotland) Cole McKinnon	Puma	Holemasters
Alloa Athletic	(Republic of Ireland) Conor Sammon	(Scotland) Scott Taggart	Pendle	McEwan Fraser Legal
Cove Rangers	(Scotland) Paul Hartley	(Scotland) Jordan White	Adidas	KR Group
East Fife	(Canada) Scott Arfield (player/manager)	(Scotland) Brian Easton	Erreà	Stuart's Bakers and Butchers (Home); JADA (Away); Ramzans.com (Third)
East Kilbride	(Scotland) Simon Ferry	(Scotland) Cameron Elliott	Adidas	Europlas (Home); SR Digital Consultancy (Away)
Hamilton Academical	(Scotland) Darian MacKinnon	(Scotland) Stephen Hendrie	Tor	None
Montrose	(Scotland) Stewart Petrie	(Scotland) Aidan Quinn	Uhlsport	Montrose Port Authority
Peterhead	(Scotland) Jordon Brown (Scotland) Ryan Strachan	(Scotland) Jason Brown	Puma	The Score Group
Queen of the South	(Scotland) Nicky Clark	(Scotland) Shaun Want	Macron	Gavin Edgar Joinery
Ross County	(Scotland) Stuart Kettlewell	(Scotland) Brian Graham	Macron	Ross-shire Engineering

=== Managerial changes ===
Team	Outgoing manager	Manner of departure	Date of vacancy	Position in table	Incoming manager	Date of appointment
Queen of the South	(Republic of Ireland) Peter Murphy	Sacked	11 May 2026	Pre-season	(Scotland) Nicky Clark	26 May 2026
Airdrieonians	(Antigua and Barbuda) Aaron Taylor-Sinclair	Sacked	20 May 2026	Pre-season	(Scotland) John Rankin	23 May 2026
East Fife	(Scotland) Dick Campbell	Sacked	14 October 2026	7th	(Canada) Scott Arfield	8 November 2026
East Kilbride	(Scotland) Mick Kennedy	Resigned	29 October 2026	4th	(Scotland) Simon Ferry	29 October 2026
Alloa Athletic	(Scotland) Andy Graham	Left By Mutual Consent	16 November 2026	10th	(Republic of Ireland) Conor Sammon	19 November 2026

== League table ==
Pos	Team	Pld	W	D	L	GF	GA	GD	Pts	Promotion, qualification or relegation
1	Ross County	16	14	2	0	56	11	+45	44	Promotion to the Championship
2	Hamilton Academical	16	11	3	2	31	13	+18	36	Qualification for the Championship play-offs
3	East Kilbride	15	7	3	5	27	20	+7	24	Qualification for the Championship play-offs
4	Airdrieonians	16	6	4	6	17	22	−5	22	Qualification for the Championship play-offs
5	Montrose	16	6	3	7	20	27	−7	21	
6	East Fife	16	4	6	6	14	19	−5	18	
7	Peterhead	16	5	1	10	13	26	−13	16	
8	Cove Rangers	15	4	3	8	18	23	−5	15	
9	Alloa Athletic	16	3	4	9	17	24	−7	13	Qualification for the League One play-offs
10	Queen of the South	16	4	1	11	15	43	−28	13	Relegation to League Two

Updated to match(es) played on 21 November 2026. Source:
Rules for classification: 1) Points; 2) Goal difference; 3) Goals scored; 4) Head-to head points; 5) Head-to-head goal difference; 6) Play-off (only for deciding promotion, play-off participation and relegation).

== Results ==
Teams play each other four times, twice in the first half of the season (home and away) and twice in the second half of the season (home and away), making a total of 180 games, with each team playing 36.

=== First half of season (Matches 1–18) ===
Home \ Away	AIR	ALL	COV	EFI	EKB	HAM	MON	PET	QOS	ROS
Airdrieonians	—	1–0	0–1	0–0	1–1	1–2	1–0	5 Dec	2–0	1–3
Alloa Athletic	2–3	—	5 Dec	0–0	1–2	0–3	3–0	1–1	0–1	12 Dec
Cove Rangers	0–0	1–1	—	1–1	15 Dec	4–0	3–0	3–0	12 Dec	0–2
East Fife	0–2	0–3	2–0	—	0–3	0–0	1–2	1–0	2–0	2–2
East Kilbride	2–2	4–1	3–0	12 Dec	—	0–1	1–1	3–1	5–1	1–2
Hamilton Academical	4–0	1–0	1–0	2–1	5 Dec	—	1–1	2–1	4–1	1–2
Montrose	12 Dec	1–1	2–1	1–2	3–0	0–5	—	3–0	2–1	0–5
Peterhead	1–2	2–1	2–0	2–1	1–0	12 Dec	0–3	—	0–1	0–1
Queen of the South	2–1	0–2	4–3	1–1	1–2	1–3	5 Dec	0–1	—	1–7
Ross County	4–0	4–1	5–1	5 Dec	4–0	1–1	2–1	4–1	8–0	—

Updated to match(es) played on 21 November 2026. Source:
Legend: Blue = home team win; Yellow = draw; Red = away team win.

=== Second half of season (Matches 19–36) ===
Home \ Away	AIR	ALL	COV	EFI	EKB	HAM	MON	PET	QOS	ROS
Airdrieonians	—	23 Jan	13 Mar	13 Feb	2 Jan	20 Mar	27 Feb	24 Apr	10 Apr	19 Dec
Alloa Athletic	27 Mar	—	24 Apr	23 Dec	20 Feb	6 Mar	30 Jan	9 Jan	20 Mar	17 Apr
Cove Rangers	9 Jan	27 Feb	—	6 Mar	1 May	17 Apr	27 Mar	26 Dec	3 Apr	30 Jan
East Fife	17 Apr	13 Mar	19 Dec	—	30 Jan	2 Jan	9 Jan	27 Mar	24 Apr	20 Feb
East Kilbride	6 Mar	10 Apr	23 Jan	3 Apr	—	13 Feb	24 Apr	27 Feb	26 Dec	20 Mar
Hamilton Academical	26 Dec	19 Dec	20 Feb	10 Apr	27 Mar	—	13 Mar	30 Jan	9 Jan	24 Apr
Montrose	1 May	3 Apr	2 Jan	20 Mar	19 Dec	23 Jan	—	10 Apr	20 Feb	6 Mar
Peterhead	20 Feb	1 May	20 Mar	23 Jan	17 Apr	3 Apr	13 Feb	—	6 Mar	2 Jan
Queen of the South	30 Jan	2 Jan	13 Feb	27 Feb	13 Mar	1 May	17 Apr	19 Dec	—	27 Mar
Ross County	3 Apr	13 Feb	10 Apr	1 May	9 Jan	27 Feb	23 Dec	13 Mar	23 Jan	—

First match(es) will be played: 19 December 2026. Source:
Legend: Blue = home team win; Yellow = draw; Red = away team win.

== Season statistics ==
As of 21 November 2026

=== Scoring ===
==== Top scorers ====
Rank	Player	Club	Goals
1	(Scotland) Brian Graham	Ross County	16
2	(Scotland) Cameron Elliott	East Kilbride	13
3	(Scotland) Andy Ryan	Hamilton Academical	8
4	(Scotland) Connor Young	Queen of the South	7
4	(England) Kieran Phillips	Ross County	7
6	(Wales) Josh Gentles	Airdrieonians	6
6	(Malaysia) Richard Chin	Ross County	6
8	(Scotland) Gary Oliver	Montrose	5
8	(Scotland) Chris Hamilton	Ross County	5

== Awards ==
Month	Manager of the Month		Player of the Month	
Month	Manager	Club	Player	Club
August	(Scotland) Stuart Kettlewell	Ross County	(Scotland) Brian Graham	Ross County
September	(Scotland) Stewart Petrie	Montrose	(Scotland) Jamie Barjonas	Montrose
October	(Scotland) Stuart Kettlewell	Ross County	(Scotland) Brian Graham	Ross County
November				
December				
January				
February				
March				
April				
