= Scottish Championship =

Association football league in Scotland

- Founded: 2013; 13 years ago
- Country: Scotland
- Confederation: UEFA
- Number of clubs: 10
- Level on pyramid: 2
- Promotion to: Scottish Premiership
- Relegation to: Scottish League One
- Domestic cup: Scottish Cup
- League cup(s): Scottish League Cup; Scottish Challenge Cup
- Current champions: St Johnstone (1st title) (Note: The Scottish Championship has only existed since 2013. For a complete record of clubs that have won the Scottish second tier, see List of winners of the Scottish Championship and predecessors.) (2025–26)
- Most championships: Dundee; Dundee United; Heart of Midlothian (2 titles)
- Broadcaster(s): BBC Scotland; BBC ALBA
- Website: spfl.co.uk
- Current: 2026–27 Scottish Championship

The Scottish Championship, known as the William Hill Championship for sponsorship reasons, is the second tier of the Scottish Professional Football League, the league competition for men's professional football clubs in Scotland. The Scottish Championship was established in July 2013, after the Scottish Professional Football League was formed by a merger of the Scottish Premier League and Scottish Football League.

== Format ==
Teams play each opponent four times in the season, twice at home and twice away from home. Teams receive three points for a win and one point for a draw. No points are awarded for a loss. Teams are ranked by total points, then goal difference, and then goals scored. At the end of each season, the club with the most points is crowned league champion. If points are equal, the goal difference determines the winner. If this still does not result in a winner, the tied teams must take part in a playoff game at a neutral venue to determine the final placings.

=== Promotion and relegation ===
The champions are directly promoted to the Scottish Premiership, swapping places with the bottom club of the Premiership. The clubs finishing 2nd, 3rd and 4th then enter the two-legged Premiership play-offs. The 3rd-placed club plays the 4th-placed club, with the winner then playing the 2nd-placed club. The winner of that game then plays against the 11th-placed Premiership club. If the Championship play-off winner prevails, the club is promoted and the Premiership club is relegated; otherwise, the Premiership club remains in its league while the Championship club is not promoted.

For promotion and relegation, the Championship play-off system closely mirrors its Premiership counterpart—the bottom-ranked club in the Championship is automatically relegated while the 9th-placed club undergoes a play-off with the 2nd, 3rd and 4th placed clubs from League One.

== Teams ==
Listed below are all the teams competing in the 2026–27 Scottish Championship season, with details of the first season they entered the second tier; the first season of their current spell in the second tier; and the last time they won the second tier.

Team	Position in 2025–26	First season in second tier	First season of current spell in second tier	Last second tier title
Arbroath	3rd, Scottish Championship	1921–22	2025–26	—
Ayr United	7th, Scottish Championship	1910–11	2018–19	1965–66
Dunfermline Athletic	4th, Scottish Championship	1912–13	2023–24	2010–11
Greenock Morton	8th, Scottish Championship	1893–94	2015–16	1986–87
Inverness Caledonian Thistle	1st, Scottish League One (promoted)	1999–2000	2026–27	2009–10
Livingston	12th, Scottish Premiership (relegated)	1974–75	2026–27	2000–01
Partick Thistle	2nd, Scottish Championship	1893–94	2021–22	2012–13
Queen's Park	6th, Scottish Championship	1922–23	2022–23	1955–56
Raith Rovers	5th, Scottish Championship	1902–03	2020–21	1994–95
Stenhousemuir	2nd, Scottish League One (promoted)	1921–22	2026–27	—

== Stadiums ==
Arbroath	Ayr United	Dunfermline Athletic	Greenock Morton	Inverness Caledonian Thistle
Gayfield Park	Somerset Park	East End Park	Cappielow Park	Caledonian Stadium
Capacity:6,056	Capacity:10,185	Capacity:11,480	Capacity:11,589	Capacity: 7,512

Livingston	Partick Thistle	Queen's Park	Raith Rovers	Stenhousemuir
Almondvale Stadium	Firhill Stadium	Lesser Hampden	Stark's Park	Ochilview Park
Capacity: 9,713	Capacity:10,887	Capacity:900	Capacity:8,867	Capacity: 3,746

== Statistics ==
=== Championships ===
Season	Winner	Runner-up	Top scorer		Players' Player of the Year (Championship)	SPFL Championship Player of the Year
Season	Winner	Runner-up	Player	Goals	Players' Player of the Year (Championship)	SPFL Championship Player of the Year
2013–14	Dundee	Hamilton Academical	Rory Loy (Falkirk)	20	Kane Hemmings (Cowdenbeath)	Not awarded
2014–15	Heart of Midlothian	Hibernian	Jason Cummings (Hibernian)	18	Scott Allan (Hibernian)	Not awarded
2015–16	Rangers	Falkirk	Martyn Waghorn (Rangers)	20	Lee Wallace (Rangers)	John McGinn (Hibernian)
2016–17	Hibernian	Falkirk	Jason Cummings (Hibernian); Stephen Dobbie (Queen of the South)	19	John McGinn (Hibernian)	John McGinn (Hibernian)
2017–18	St Mirren	Livingston	Stephen Dobbie (Queen of the South)	18	Lewis Morgan (St Mirren)	Lewis Morgan (St Mirren)
2018–19	Ross County	Dundee United	Lawrence Shankland (Ayr United)	24	Stephen Dobbie (Queen of the South)	Stephen Dobbie (Queen of the South)
2019–20 (Note: The 2019–20 Scottish Championship was suspended in March 2020 due to the COVID-19 pandemic in Scotland. The season was subsequently curtailed on 15 April 2020 and a points per game average was used to calculate a final table.)	Dundee United	Inverness Caledonian Thistle	Lawrence Shankland (Dundee United)	24	Not awarded	Not awarded
2020–21	Heart of Midlothian	Dundee	Liam Boyce (Heart of Midlothian)	14	Liam Boyce (Heart of Midlothian)	Charlie Adam (Dundee)
2021–22	Kilmarnock	Arbroath	Michael McKenna (Arbroath)	15	Michael McKenna (Arbroath)	Michael McKenna (Arbroath)
2022–23	Dundee	Ayr United	Dipo Akinyemi (Ayr United)	20	Dipo Akinyemi (Ayr United)	Dipo Akinyemi (Ayr United)
2023–24	Dundee United	Raith Rovers	Brian Graham (Partick Thistle)	20	Brian Graham (Partick Thistle)	Louis Moult (Dundee United)
2024–25	Falkirk	Livingston	Brian Graham (Partick Thistle)	15	Brad Spencer (Falkirk)	Calvin Miller (Falkirk)
2025–26	St Johnstone	Partick Thistle	Josh McPake (St Johnstone)	16	Josh McPake (St Johnstone)	Josh McPake (St Johnstone)

=== Records and awards ===
Biggest home win
Heart of Midlothian 10–0 Cowdenbeath, 28 February 2015
Biggest away win
Dumbarton 0–6 Rangers, 2 January 2016;
Most points in a season
91; Heart of Midlothian, 2014–15
Fewest points in a season
4; Brechin City, 2017–18
Fewest goals scored in a season
20; Brechin City, 2017–18
Most goals scored in a season
96; Heart of Midlothian, 2014–15
Most goals conceded in a season
90; Brechin City, 2017–18
Fewest goals conceded in a season
23; Dundee United, 2023–24 (Note: Dundee United conceded 22 goals in the curtailed 2019–20 season (28 games).)
Highest attendance
50,349; Rangers 1–1 Alloa Athletic, 23 April 2016
Lowest attendance
318; Cowdenbeath 3–0 Greenock Morton, 25 March 2014

=== Top goalscorers ===
As of 29 September 2023

Rank	Player	Club(s) (Note: Clubs only include those where players scored goals in the Scottish Championship.)	Goals
1	Stephen Dobbie	Queen of the South (2016–2021)	69
2	Jason Cummings	Hibernian (2014–2017); Dundee (2020–2021)	63
3	Lawrence Shankland	St Mirren (2015–2017); Greenock Morton (2017); Ayr United (2018–2019); Dundee United (2019–2020)	62
4	**Nicky Clark**	Rangers (2014–2016); Dunfermline Athletic (2016–2018); Dundee United (2018–2020) Ross County (2025)	54
5	Derek Lyle	Queen of the South (2013–2018)	51

Italics denotes players still playing professional football,
Bold denotes players still playing in the Scottish Championship.
