= Scottish League One =

Association football league in Scotland

- Founded: 2013; 13 years ago
- Country: Scotland
- Confederation: UEFA
- Number of clubs: 10
- Level on pyramid: 3
- Promotion to: Scottish Championship
- Relegation to: Scottish League Two
- Domestic cup: Scottish Cup
- League cup(s): Scottish League Cup; Scottish Challenge Cup
- Current champions: Inverness Caledonian Thistle (1st title) (Note: Scottish League One has only existed since 2013. For a complete record of clubs that have won the Scottish third tier, see List of winners of the Scottish League One and predecessors.) (2025–26)
- Most championships: Dunfermline Athletic; Arbroath (2 titles)
- Broadcaster(s): BBC Alba
- Website: spfl.co.uk
- Current: 2026–27 Scottish League One

The Scottish League One, known as William Hill League One for sponsorship reasons, is the third tier of the Scottish Professional Football League, the league competition for men's professional football clubs in Scotland. The Scottish League One was established in July 2013, after the Scottish Professional Football League was formed by a merger of the Scottish Premier League and Scottish Football League.

== Format ==
Teams receive three points for a win and one point for a draw. No points are awarded for a loss. Teams are ranked by total points, then goal difference, and then goals scored. At the end of each season, the club with the most points is crowned league champion. If points are equal, the goal difference determines the winner. If this still does not result in a winner, the tied teams must take part in a playoff game at a neutral venue to determine the final placings.

=== Promotion and relegation ===
The champions are directly promoted to the Scottish Championship, swapping places with the bottom club of the championship. The clubs finishing 2nd, 3rd, 4th in League One, and the 9th placed team in the Championship then enter the two-legged Championship play-off. The 2nd-placed League One club plays the 3rd-placed League One club, whilst the team who finished 4th in League One will play the 9th-placed Championship side. The winners of these ties will then play each other. If a League One play-off winner prevails, that club is promoted, with the championship club being relegated. If the Championship side is victorious, they then retain their place in the Championship.

For promotion and relegation, the League One play-off system closely mirrors its Championship counterpart, in which the bottom club of League One is automatically relegated and the 9th-placed club undergoes a play-off with the 2nd, 3rd and 4th placed clubs from League Two.

== Teams ==
Listed below are all the teams competing in the 2026–27 Scottish League One season, with details of the first season they entered the third tier; the first season of their current spell in the third tier; and the last time they won the third tier.

Team	Position in 2025–26	First season in third tier	First season of current spell in third tier	Last title (3rd tier)
Airdrieonians	9th, Scottish Championship (relegated)	2002–03	2026–27	2003–04
Alloa Athletic	4th, Scottish League One	1975–76	2021–22	—
Cove Rangers	7th, Scottish League One	2020–21	2023–24	2021–22
East Kilbride	1st, Scottish League Two (promoted)	2026–27	2026–27	—
East Fife	8th, Scottish League One	1978–79	2025-26	—
Hamilton Academical	9th, Scottish League One	1996–97	2025–26	—
Montrose	6th, Scottish League One	1923–24	2018–19	1984–85
Peterhead	5th, Scottish League One	2005–06	2025–26	—
Queen of the South	3rd, Scottish League One	1923–24	2022–23	2012–13
Ross County	10th, Scottish Championship (relegated)	1999-00	2026–27	2007–08

== Stadiums ==
Airdrieonians	Alloa Athletic	Cove Rangers	East Fife	East Kilbride
Excelsior Stadium	Recreation Park	Balmoral Stadium	Bayview Stadium	K-Park Training Academy
Capacity:10,101	Capacity: 3,100	Capacity: 2,602	Capacity: 1,980	Capacity: 700

Hamilton Academical	Montrose	Peterhead	Queen of the South	Ross County
New Douglas Park	Links Park	Balmoor	Palmerston Park	Victoria Park
Capacity:6,018	Capacity:4,936	Capacity:3,150	Capacity: 8,690	Capacity: 6,541

== Statistics ==
=== Championships ===
Season	Winner	Runner-up	Top scorer	
Season	Winner	Runner-up	Player	Goals
2013–14	Rangers	Dunfermline Athletic	Michael Moffat (Ayr United)	26
2014–15	Greenock Morton	Stranraer	Declan McManus (Greenock Morton)	20
2015–16	Dunfermline Athletic	Ayr United	Faissal El Bakhtaoui (Dunfermline Athletic); Rory McAllister (Peterhead)	22
2016–17	Livingston	Alloa Athletic	Andy Ryan (Airdrieonians)	23
2017–18	Ayr United	Raith Rovers	Lawrence Shankland (Ayr United)	26
2018–19	Arbroath	Forfar Athletic	Kevin Nisbet (Raith Rovers)	30
2019–20	Raith Rovers	Falkirk	David Goodwillie (Clyde)	20
2020–21	Partick Thistle	Airdrieonians	Mitch Megginson (Cove Rangers)	14
2021–22	Cove Rangers	Airdrieonians	Mitch Megginson (Cove Rangers)	18
2022–23	Dunfermline Athletic	Falkirk	Callum Gallagher (Airdrieonians); Ruari Paton (Queen of the South)	22
2023–24	Falkirk	Hamilton Academical	Callumn Morrison (Falkirk)	23
2024–25	Arbroath	Cove Rangers	Mitch Megginson (Cove Rangers); Ross Cunningham (Kelty Hearts)	13
2025–26	Inverness Caledonian Thistle	Stenhousemuir	Oli Shaw (Hamilton Academical)	19

=== Top goalscorers ===
As of 1 January 2026

Rank	Player	Club(s) (Note: Clubs only include those where players scored goals in the Scottish League One.)	Goals
1	Rory McAllister	Peterhead (2014–2017; 2019–2020); Cove Rangers (2020–2022); Montrose (2022–2023)	83
2	Calum Gallagher	Rangers (2013–2014); Dumbarton (2018–2019); Airdrieonians (2019–2023)	68
2	Ryan Wallace	Dunfermline Athletic (2013–2016); Albion Rovers (2016–2017); Stranraer (2017); Arbroath (2018–2019); East Fife (2019–2022)	68
4	**Mitch Megginson**	Cove Rangers (2020–2022; 2023–)	61
5	Alan Trouten	Brechin City (2013–2015); Ayr United (2015–2016); Brechin City (2016–2017); Albion Rovers (2017–2018); Alloa Athletic (2021–2022)	58

Italics denotes players still playing football,
Bold denotes players still playing in Scottish League One.
